= (678191) 2017 OF69 =

Trans-Neptunian object

(678191) 2017 OF_{69}
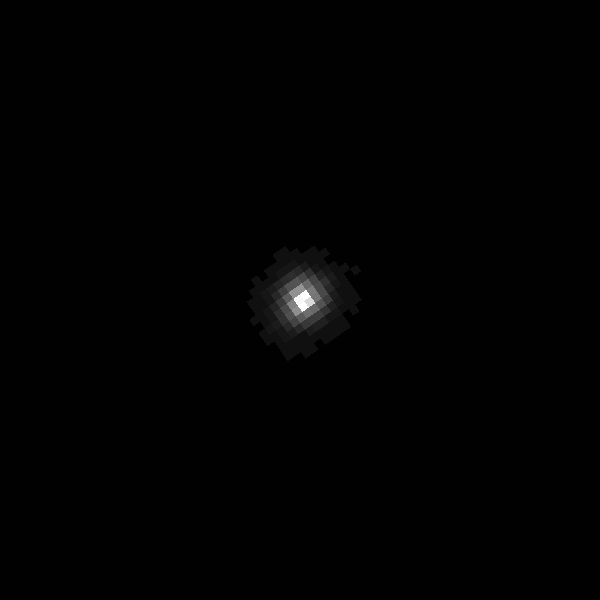
- 2017 OF_{69} photographed by the Hubble Space Telescope on 9 June 2026

Discovery
- Discovered by: David J. Tholen; Scott S. Sheppard; Chad Trujillo
- Discovery site: Maunakea Obs.
- Discovery date: 26 July 2017

Designations
- Minor planet category: TNO · plutino · distant

Orbital characteristics
- Epoch 27 April 2019 (JD 2458600.5)
- Uncertainty parameter 3
- Observation arc: 6.01 yr (2,195 d)
- Aphelion: 47.844 AU (7.1574 Tm)
- Perihelion: 31.418 AU (4.7001 Tm)
- Semi-major axis: 39.631 AU (5.9287 Tm)
- Eccentricity: 0.2072
- Orbital period (sidereal): 249.49 yr (91,128 d)
- Mean anomaly: 251.02°
- Mean motion: 0° 0^{m} 14.4^{s} / day
- Inclination: 13.654°
- Longitude of ascending node: 218.53°
- Argument of perihelion: 215.37°
- Known satellites: 0

Physical characteristics
- Mean diameter: >278.8 km 662 km (est.)
- Geometric albedo: 0.074 (assumed) <0.42
- Absolute magnitude (H): 4.34

(678191) 2017 OF_{69} is a trans-Neptunian object located in the Kuiper belt, a region of the Solar System beyond the orbit of Neptune. It is a member of the plutinos, a population of Kuiper belt objects in a 2:3 orbital resonance with Neptune, like Pluto. The object measures approximately 662 kilometers (410 miles) in diameter. It was discovered on 26 July 2017, by American astronomers David Tholen, Scott Sheppard, and Chad Trujillo at Maunakea Observatory in Hawaii, but not announced until 31 May 2018 due to observations made in April and May 2018 refining its orbit significantly.

2017 OF_{69} was photographed by the Hubble Space Telescope on 9 June 2026, during a search for moons around large trans-Neptunian objects.

== Orbit and classification ==
2017 OF_{69} is a large plutino, a subgroup of the resonant trans-Neptunian objects located in the inner region of Kuiper belt. Named after the group's largest member, Pluto, the plutinos have a 2:3 orbital resonance with Neptune.

It orbits the Sun at a distance of 31.4–47.8 AU once every 249 years and 6 months (91,128 days; semi-major axis of 39.63 AU). Its orbit has an eccentricity of 0.21 and an inclination of 14° with respect to the ecliptic. The body's observation arc begins with a precovery by Pan-STARRS in June 2012.

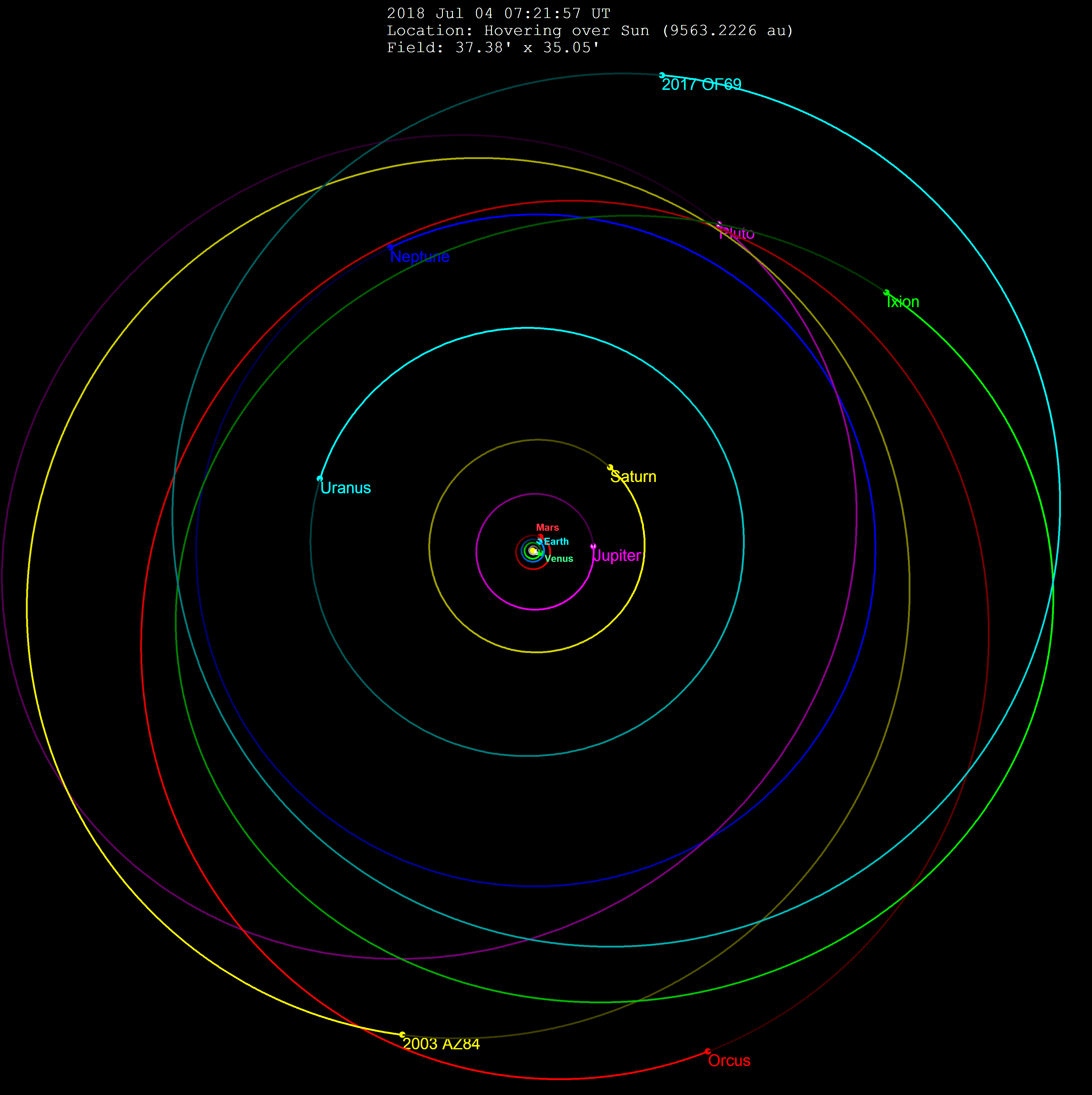
Orbital diagram of 2017 OF_{69} with other large plutinos: Pluto, Orcus, Achlys and Ixion

== Numbering and naming ==
This minor planet was numbered by the Minor Planet Center on 22 March 2024 (M.P.C. 172722). As of January 2026, it has not been named.

== Physical characteristics ==
=== Diameter and albedo ===
According to Johnston's Archive, 2017 OF_{69} measures 662 kilometers in diameter assuming an albedo of 0.074 for the body's surface. This makes 2017 OF_{69} a notably large body for how late it has been discovered, being the fifth largest plutino in the Solar System, after Pluto, Orcus, Achlys, and Ixion, and the largest discovered since Orcus in 2004.

According to the SOSB website, an occultation in the Czech Republic shows its equatorial diameter is over 278.8 km (173.2 mi), using only one positive chord. however its likely way larger than the value for this diameter. Using this diameter, its albedo must be under 0.42.

=== Rotation period ===
As of 2018, no rotational lightcurve of 2017 OF_{69} has been obtained from photometric observations. The body's rotation period, pole and shape remain unknown.

== See also ==
- (84922) 2003 VS2 – an elongated plutino with a similar size as 2017 OF_{69}
