= (612533) 2002 XV93 =

Plutino with a thin atmosphere

(612533) 2002 XV_{93}
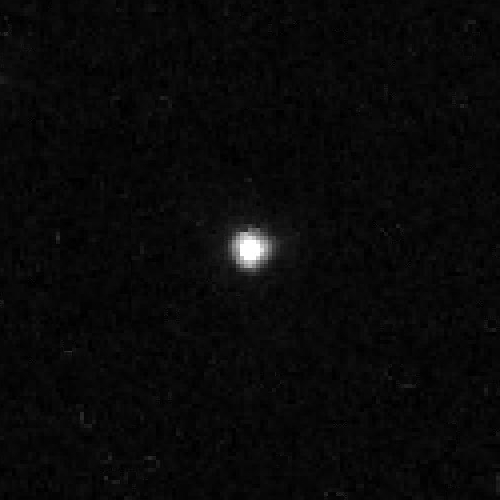
- 2002 XV_{93} imaged by the Hubble Space Telescope in August 2005

Discovery
- Discovered by: Palomar
- Discovery site: Palomar Observatory
- Discovery date: 10 December 2002

Designations
- Minor planet category: TNO · plutino · distant

Orbital characteristics (barycentric) (Note: These orbital elements are expressed in terms of the Solar System Barycenter (SSB) as the frame of reference. Due to planetary perturbations, the Sun revolves around the SSB at non-negligible distances, so heliocentric-frame orbital elements and distances (such as those given in JPL's Small-Body Database) can vary on short timescales.)
- Epoch 21 November 2025 (JD 2461000.5)
- Uncertainty parameter 2
- Observation arc: 35+ yr
- Earliest precovery date: 16 October 1990
- Aphelion: 44.212 AU
- Perihelion: 34.405 AU
- Semi-major axis: 39.309 AU
- Eccentricity: 0.1247
- Orbital period (sidereal): 246.29 yr (89,958 d)
- Mean anomaly: 295.225°
- Mean motion: 0° 0^{m} 12.241^{s} / day
- Inclination: 13.270°
- Longitude of ascending node: 19.043°
- Time of perihelion: 20 March 2070 ±1.10 days
- Argument of perihelion: 164.647°
- Known satellites: 0

Physical characteristics
- Mean diameter: 470+44 −30 km (2026); 549.2+21.7 −23.0 km (2012)
- Geometric albedo: >0.040+0.020 −0.015 (2012) (Note: This albedo estimate was made in 2012 using an absolute magnitude 5.42±0.46 and thermal emission-derived diameter of 549.2+21.7 −23.0 km. More recent measurements have since found a brighter absolute magnitude of 4.73 and a smaller diameter of 470+44 −30 km, which should indicate a higher albedo for 2002 XV_{93}. (Note: The diameter (d), visual albedo (p_{V}), and visual absolute magnitude (H) are related via the equation $d {{=}} 2\delta \times 10^{V_{\odot}/5} \times \frac{10^{H/5}}{\sqrt{p_V}}$, where $\delta$ is 2002 XV_{93}'s distance from Earth and $V_{\odot}$ is the Sun's visual (V-band) apparent magnitude. The diameter of 2002 XV_{93} was determined from its thermal emission, while its absolute magnitude was determined from optical measurements of its brightness. The albedo is derived from these two quantities via the equation given here.))
Surface temp.	min	mean	max
Kelvin	40	47	50
- Spectral type: Prominent water (H_{2}O/"bowl" type); B−V = 0.72±0.02; V−R = 0.37±0.02
- Apparent magnitude: 20.8
- Absolute magnitude (H): 4.73 (2016); 5.42±0.46 (2012)

Atmosphere
- Surface pressure: 100–200 nbar (0.01–0.02 Pa)
- Composition by volume: unknown; nitrogen, argon, or methane?

(612533) 2002 XV_{93} is an unnamed trans-Neptunian object (TNO) in the Kuiper belt, discovered by the Palomar Observatory in December 2002. It is a member of the plutinos, a population of TNOs in a 2:3 orbital resonance with Neptune, like the dwarf planet Pluto. 2002 XV_{93} has a diameter of around 430 to 510 km (270 to 320 mi), which makes it about one-seventh the diameter of Earth's moon and about one-fifth the diameter of Pluto. It has a dark gray surface containing high amounts of water ice and some frozen carbon dioxide, but no detectable signs of frozen methane, nitrogen, or carbon monoxide. The mass, density, shape, and rotation of 2002 XV_{93} are all unknown, but are expected to resemble those of other similarly-sized TNOs like Huya.

In 2026, astronomers announced the discovery of a thin atmosphere around 2002 XV_{93}, making it likely the first TNO after Pluto discovered to have an atmosphere, (Note: The James Webb Space Telescope has shown evidence of gaseous methane on the trans-Neptunian dwarf planet Makemake, but it is unclear whether its methane comes from an atmosphere or temporary outgassing.) and defying expectations that it should be too small to hold onto an atmosphere. With a surface pressure of 100–200 nanobars (roughly 5 million to 10 million times thinner than Earth's atmosphere or 50 to 100 times thinner than Pluto's atmosphere), it is predicted that 2002 XV_{93} should lose all of its atmosphere in 100 to 1,000 years. The existence of 2002 XV_{93}'s atmosphere suggests it was recently replenished, either by a comet impact or outgassing via cryovolcanic eruptions. The composition of the atmosphere is unknown, but it is expected to contain either nitrogen, argon, or methane.

== Discovery and observation history ==
2002 XV_{93} was discovered on 10 December 2002 (Universal Time; UT) by Palomar Observatory (Note: The discoverer is labelled "Palomar" by the MPC.) in California, United States. At that time, a team of astronomers led by Chad Trujillo and Michael E. Brown were working in Palomar Observatory using its 1.2-m Samuel Oschin telescope, operating jointly with the Near-Earth Asteroid Tracking (NEAT) program. The object's discovery was announced by the Minor Planet Center (MPC) on 5 January 2003. Precovery observations of 2002 XV_{93} from Palomar Observatory were later identified in 2008, with the observations dating to 16 October 1990, 12 October 1991, and 28 September 1992.

On 10 January 2024 (UT), 2002 XV_{93} passed in front of a magnitude-15.8 star in the constellation Auriga, causing it to briefly dim from Earth for up to 20 seconds. (Note: The occulted star on 10 January 2024 was Gaia DR3 940732910252854272.) This event, known as a stellar occultation, was predicted and observed in Japan by a team of astronomers led by Ko Arimatsu of the National Astronomical Observatory of Japan. Telescopes were stationed at Kyoto University, Kiso Observatory, Fukushima Prefecture, and Okayama Observatory, but only the first three sites detected the occultation. All detections showed that the star faded gradually (lasting up to 1.5 seconds) rather than abruptly during the occultation, revealing that 2002 XV_{93} had an atmosphere. The discovery was announced on 4 May 2026, making 2002 XV_{93} likely the first trans-Neptunian object after Pluto discovered to have an atmosphere.

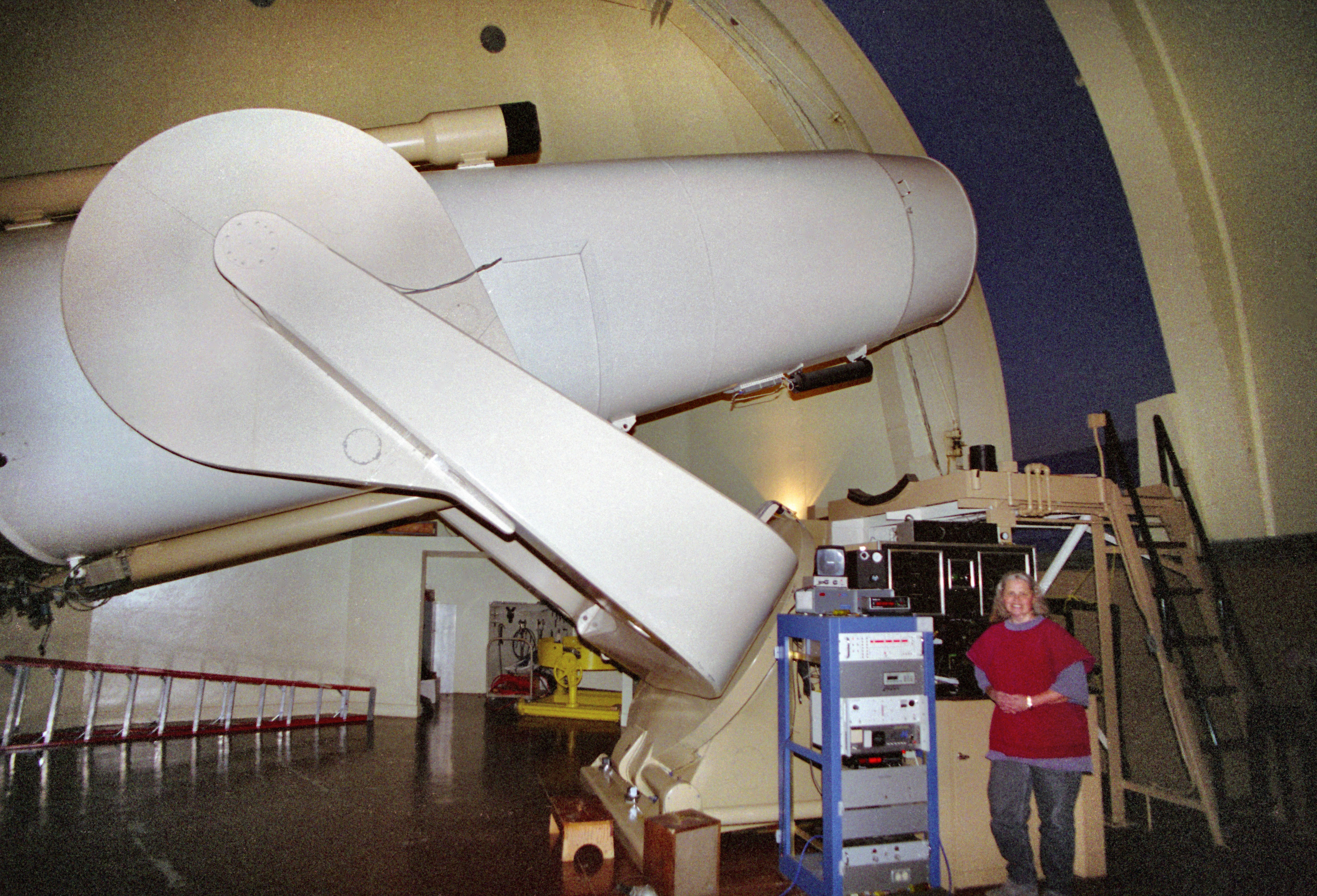
2002 XV_{93} was discovered by the 1.2-meter Samuel Oschin telescope at Palomar Observatory, as shown in this photograph.

== Name ==
This object is currently known by its minor planet provisional designation 2002 XV_{93}, given by the MPC upon its discovery. The MPC gave it the minor planet number of 612533 on 28 March 2022. As of May 2026, it has not been named. According to naming guidelines by the International Astronomical Union's Working Group for Small Bodies Nomenclature, trans-Neptunian objects classified as plutinos, such as 2002 XV_{93}, should be given mythological names related to the underworld. Since 2002 XV_{93} received its minor planet number less than 10 years ago, only the discoverer has the privilege of naming it.

In an interview with Reuters on 4 May 2026, Arimatsu remarked that the current designation of 2002 XV_{93} is unmemorable and advocated for a name related to Okinawan mythology, such as Amamikyu (/əˈmɑːmikjuː/). Michael E. Brown, who was involved in Palomar Observatory's discovery of 2002 XV_{93}, commented that the object did not get named because it had no known remarkable properties before Arimatsu's discovery of its atmosphere.

== Orbit ==
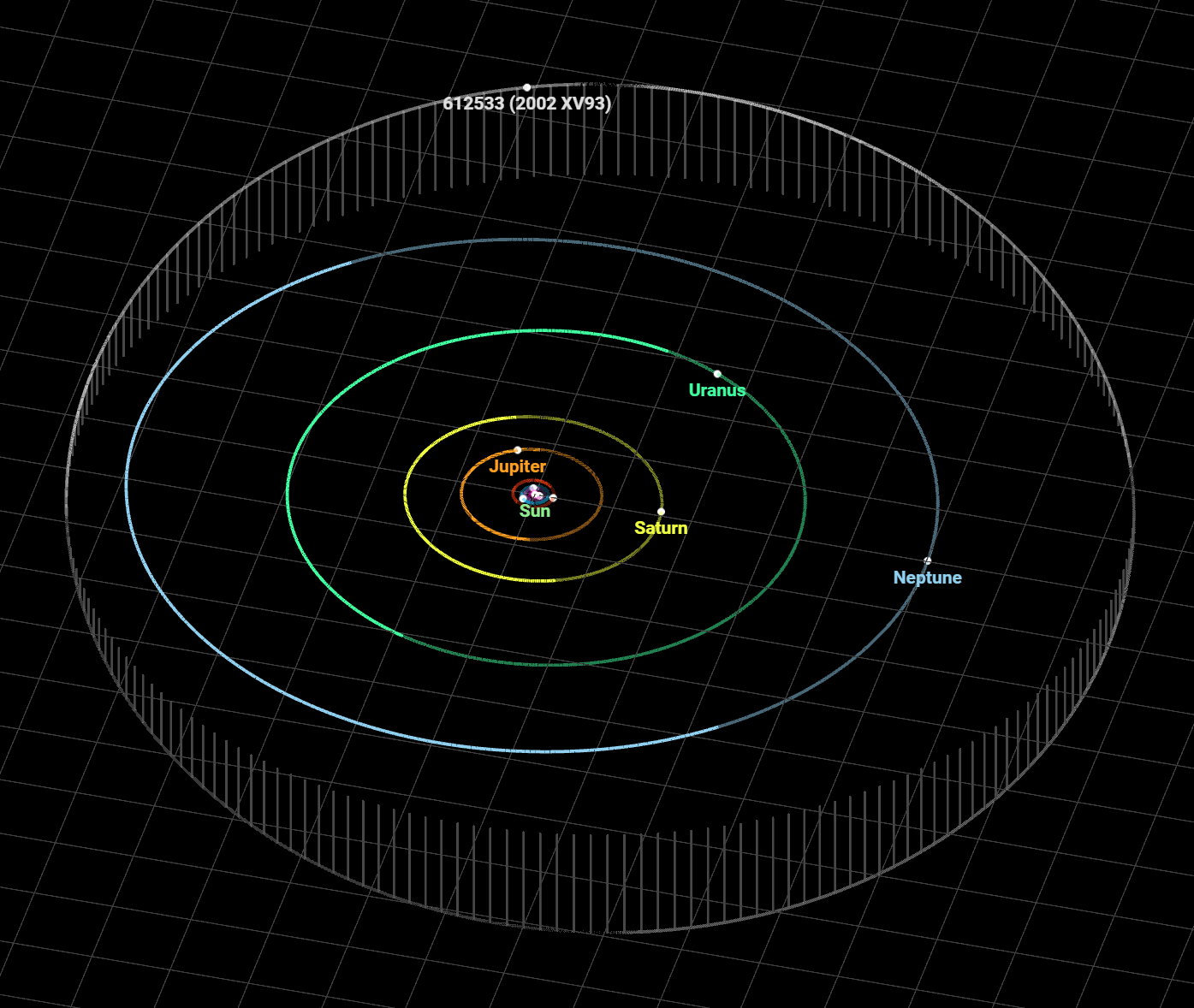
Diagram showing the orbits of 2002 XV_{93} (white) and the outer planets

2002 XV_{93} orbits the Sun's barycenter with a semi-major axis of 39.3 astronomical units (AU), putting it in the Kuiper belt beyond Neptune's orbit. 2002 XV_{93} takes 246 years to complete one orbit, which places it in a 2:3 mean-motion resonance with Neptune. For every two revolutions it makes around the Sun, Neptune makes exactly three. It is therefore a member of the plutinos, a large population of trans-Neptunian objects (TNOs) named after its largest member Pluto.

2002 XV_{93}'s orbit is elliptical, with an orbital eccentricity of 0.12, and inclined by 13° with respect to the ecliptic. Its distance from the Sun ranges from 34.4 AU at perihelion to 44.2 AU at aphelion. 2002 XV_{93} will come to perihelion in March 2070. Due to gravitational perturbations by the giant planets, the orbital elements of 2002 XV_{93} vary over time. Simulations of 2002 XV_{93}'s orbit show that in 10 million years, its semi-major axis can fluctuate between 39.1–39.9 AU, eccentricity between 0.10–0.15, and inclination between 12.5–13.9°.

== Physical characteristics ==
=== Size ===
Size comparison of 2002 XV_{93}, Pluto, and the asteroid Vesta (which is irregularly shaped with no atmosphere). The atmospheres of 2002 XV_{93} and Pluto are depicted as a blue glow, brightness exaggerated for visibility.

Observations of a stellar occultation in 2024 show that 2002 XV_{93} has a radius of 235+22
−15 km, or a diameter of 470+44
−30 km, assuming it has a spherical shape. For comparison, 2002 XV_{93} is about one-seventh the diameter of Earth's moon and about one-fifth the diameter of Pluto. The mass, bulk density, and shape of 2002 XV_{93} are unknown, though they can be inferred from those of other similarly-sized TNOs like Huya. A 2026 study by Arimatsu and colleagues assumed 2002 XV_{93} had a bulk density between 1.0 and 1.5 g/cm^{3}, similar to those of Huya and Pluto's moon Charon, respectively. The surface gravity of 2002 XV_{93} is estimated to be around 100 times weaker than Earth's. Arimatsu and colleagues expect that 2002 XV_{93} has a non-spherical shape due to its relatively small diameter of a few hundred kilometres. The rotation period of 2002 XV_{93} is unknown and it has not yet been studied via light curves, according to the Asteroid Lightcurve Database.

Some astronomers, including Noemi Pinilla-Alonso and Michael E. Brown, previously suggested that 2002 XV_{93} could be theoretically large enough to become spherical and be possibly a dwarf planet, based on a larger diameter estimate from 2012. This outdated estimate had 2002 XV_{93} 549.2+21.7
−23.0 km in diameter, based on mid- to far-infrared measurements of its thermal emission by the Herschel Space Observatory and Spitzer Space Telescope.

=== Surface ===
==== Albedo, color, and temperature ====
Measurements of 2002 XV_{93}'s visible brightness and infrared thermal radiation suggest that its surface is dark, with a very low geometric albedo of 0.040+0.020
−0.015. However, this estimate was made in 2012 using a visible-light (V-band) absolute magnitude 5.42±0.46 and thermal emission-derived diameter of 549.2+21.7
−23.0 km. More recent measurements have since found a brighter V-band absolute magnitude of 4.73 and a smaller diameter of 470+44
−30 km, which should indicate a higher albedo for 2002 XV_{93}. However, as of May 2026, no peer-reviewed studies have recalculated 2002 XV_{93}'s albedo using newer measurements of its absolute magnitude and diameter.

Telescopic observations in visible light show that the surface color of 2002 XV_{93} is gray, (Note: Tegler et al. (2016) define "gray" as having a B–R color index around or less than 1.22. The B–R color index of 2002 XV_{93} is 1.10±0.02.) similar to some centaurs and Kuiper belt objects including Achlys and 2004 EW95. Due to 2002 XV_{93}'s great distance from the Sun, its surface temperature averages around 47 K (−226.2 °C; −375.1 °F), cold enough to freeze substances like water into solid ice.

==== Composition and spectrum ====
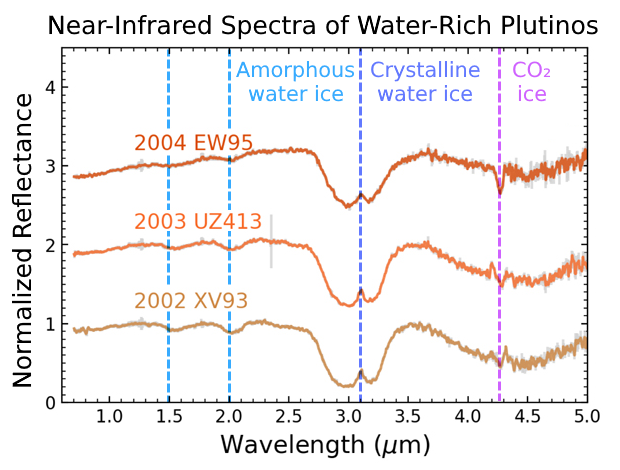
Near-infrared spectra of three water ice-rich plutinos observed by JWST, including 2002 XV_{93} at the bottom. Water and carbon dioxide ices are present in all three objects.

Near-infrared spectroscopy by the James Webb Space Telescope (JWST) has shown that the surface of 2002 XV_{93} is rich in water ice, in both amorphous and crystalline phases. The abundance of water ice in 2002 XV_{93}'s surface is indicated by the presence of absorption bands at wavelengths of 1.5, 2.0, 3.0, and 4.5 μm in the object's near-infrared spectrum, alongside a reflectance peak at 3.1 μm due to crystalline water ice. In the Kuiper belt, crystalline water ice tends to transform into amorphous water ice due to irradiation by cosmic rays, though both phases are expected to be in equilibrium (i.e. amounts of crystalline and amorphous water ice remain constant). 2002 XV_{93} shares its water ice-rich surface composition with other TNOs, including the plutinos 2004 EW_{95} and 2003 UZ413. These TNOs are classified as "prominent water"-type or "Bowl"-type TNOs, because their near-infrared spectra display a significant bowl-shaped water ice absorption band at the wavelength of 3.0 μm.

Besides water, JWST has detected frozen carbon dioxide (CO_{2}) on 2002 XV_{93}'s surface. JWST has also detected trace amounts of ^{13}CO_{2} (a rare isotopologue of CO_{2}). In observations from 2022 and 2024, JWST found no signs of hypervolatile compounds such as methane, nitrogen, and carbon monoxide (which can sublimate into gases at 2002 XV_{93}'s temperature). The lack of hypervolatiles on 2002 XV_{93}'s surface suggests that most of them had already sublimated and escaped into space.

== Atmosphere ==
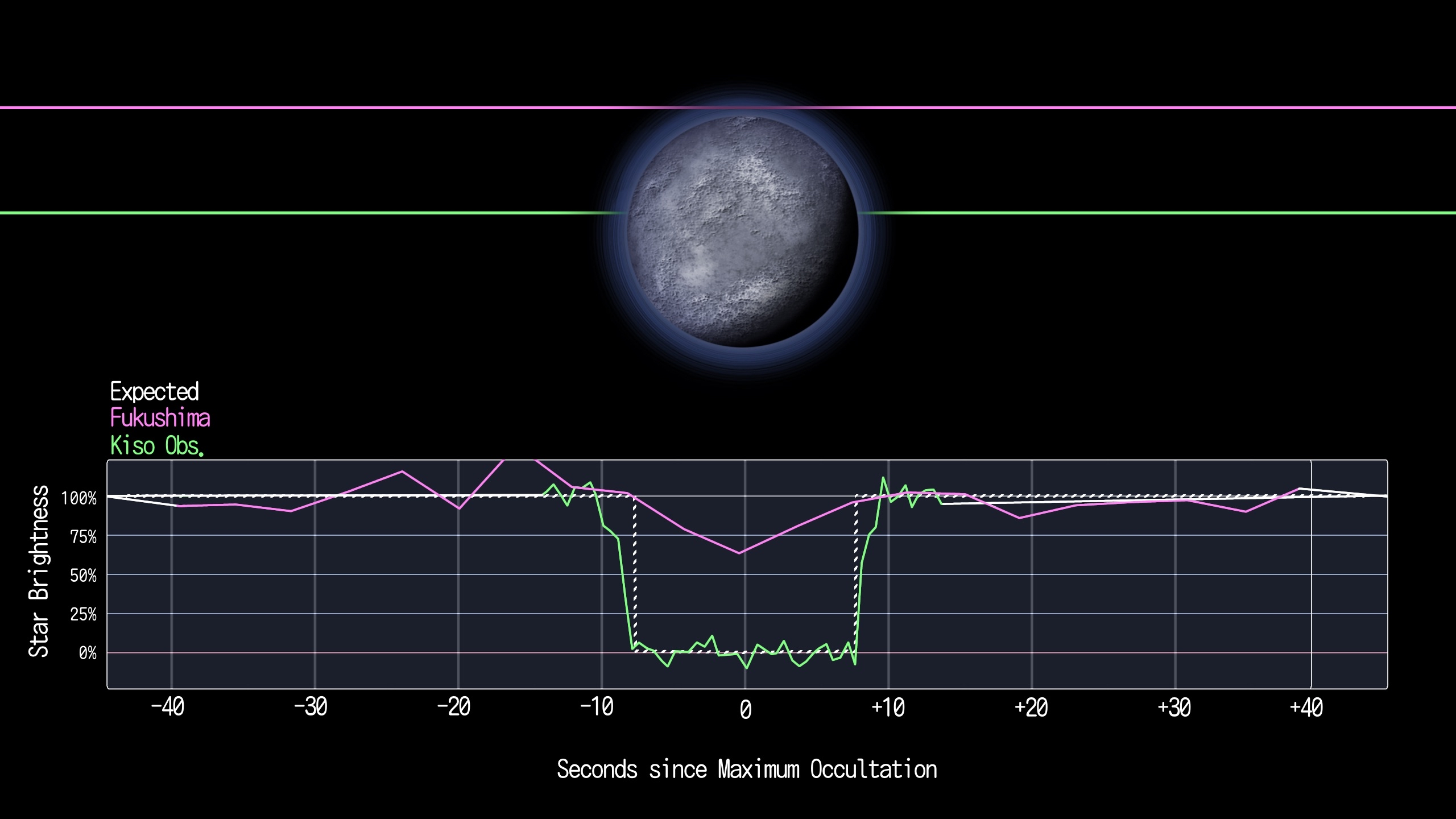
Visual diagram of the January 2024 stellar occultation by 2002 XV_{93}

In May 2026, a research team led by Ko Arimatsu announced the discovery of a thin atmosphere around 2002 XV_{93}, making it possibly the first TNO after Pluto discovered to have an atmosphere. The atmosphere was inferred from observations of a stellar occultation in January 2024, when 2002 XV_{93} passed in front of a star and dimmed its light gradually (lasting 1.5 seconds) instead of abruptly, indicating refraction by an atmosphere. The gradual disappearance and reappearance of the star was observed to occur within radii of 230 to 270 km (140 to 170 mi) from 2002 XV_{93}'s center. Alternate explanations for this gradual fading, such as a ring system or a shell of dust, are considered unlikely.

Based on the observed fading of the occulted star, Arimatsu's team estimated that the atmospheric pressure on 2002 XV_{93}'s surface is between 100 and 200 nanobars—roughly 5 million to 10 million times thinner than Earth's atmosphere and about 50 to 100 times thinner than Pluto's atmosphere, but about 100 to 200 times denser than Europa's exosphere. At this pressure, 2002 XV_{93}'s atmosphere is dense enough (>0.001 nanobar) that its gas molecules can collide amongst themselves, making it a true atmosphere rather than an exosphere. No other TNO besides Pluto is known to have an atmospheric pressure this high. However, it is unclear how the density of 2002 XV_{93}'s atmosphere changes with altitude.

The composition 2002 XV_{93}'s atmosphere is unknown, and there are competing hypotheses for it. One possible composition is methane, a common hypervolatile found in TNOs. In occultation observations, 2002 XV_{93}'s atmosphere appeared to show a sudden change in refraction at a certain altitude, suggesting that it has a thermal inversion caused by upper-atmospheric heating of trace methane gas (similar to Pluto). However, JWST observed the object after its 2024 occultation and found no signs of methane and carbon monoxide gas, suggesting they do not make up much of its atmosphere. If these gases exist over a large altitude range, their partial pressures at 2002 XV_{93}'s surface must be less than 0.0003 nanobars (0.3 picobars). However, it remains possible that a low-altitude atmosphere of pure methane could exist. Using these JWST observations, a research team headed by Ian Wong proposed that 2002 XV_{93}'s atmosphere could contain either nitrogen, argon, or any other gas that is unable to be detected by JWST.

The discovery of an atmosphere around 2002 XV_{93} was unexpected because the object is too small to have a surface gravity strong enough to theoretically hold on to an atmosphere over the age of the Solar System. Physical models predict that 2002 XV_{93} should lose all of its atmosphere within 100 to 1,000 years via Jeans escape. The present-day existence of 2002 XV_{93}'s atmosphere implies that it was recently replenished, though the cause is unknown. Sublimation of volatile ices on 2002 XV_{93}'s surface is unlikely, because it was not detected in earlier JWST observations. Arimatsu's team hypothesized that 2002 XV_{93} obtained its atmosphere via either an impact by a hundred-meter-radius comet, or outgassing by cryovolcanic eruptions. These hypotheses can be tested with later observations by occultations: if the atmosphere came from an impact, then its surface pressure should decrease over time, whereas if the atmosphere is sustained by outgassing, then the surface pressure should stay consistent with possibly slow seasonal changes.

== See also ==
- 208996 Achlys – a large plutino and possible dwarf planet with an elongated ellipsoid shape
- (84922) 2003 VS2, a similarly-sized plutino whose shape has been characterized by stellar occultations
- (84522) 2002 TC302, another similarly-sized trans-Neptunian object whose shape has been characterized by stellar occultations
- (119951) 2002 KX14, another similarly-sized trans-Neptunian object whose shape has been characterized by stellar occultations
