= (84522) 2002 TC302 =

Resonant trans-Neptunian object

(84522) 2002 TC_{302}
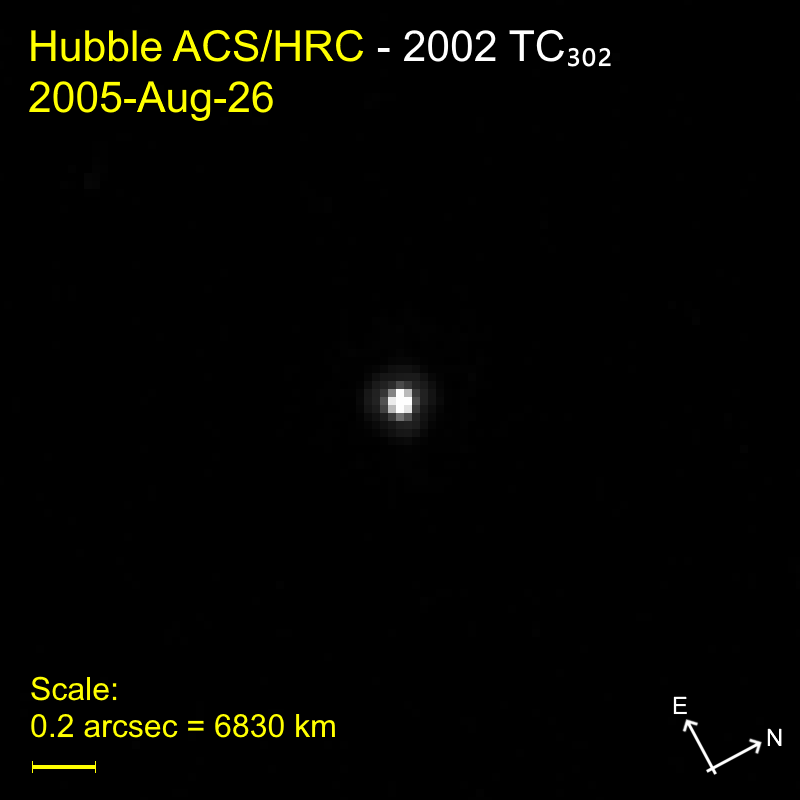
- 2002 TC_{302} (center dot) photographed by the Hubble Space Telescope in 2005

Discovery
- Discovered by: Palomar (Note: The discoverer is labeled "Palomar" by the MPC.)
- Discovery site: Palomar Observatory
- Discovery date: 9 October 2002

Designations
- Minor planet category: TNO · SDO; 2:5 res. · distant

Orbital characteristics (barycentric) (Note: These orbital elements are expressed in terms of the Solar System Barycenter (SSB) as the frame of reference. Due to planetary perturbations, the Sun revolves around the SSB at non-negligible distances, so heliocentric-frame orbital elements and distances (such as those given in JPL's Small-Body Database) can vary on short timescales.)
- Epoch 21 November 2025 (JD 2461000.5)
- Uncertainty parameter 2
- Observation arc: 25+ yr
- Earliest precovery date: 5 August 2000
- Aphelion: 71.528 AU
- Perihelion: 39.070 AU
- Semi-major axis: 55.299 AU
- Eccentricity: 0.2938
- Orbital period (sidereal): 410.96 yr (150,102 d)
- Mean anomaly: 330.876°
- Mean motion: 0° 0^{m} 8.634^{s} / day
- Inclination: 35.038°
- Longitude of ascending node: 23.855°
- Time of perihelion: 21 October 2058
- Argument of perihelion: 86.764°
- Known satellites: 0 (1 unconfirmed)

Physical characteristics
- Dimensions: 529.9 × 468.7 km (2021) (Note: These dimensions represent a two-dimensional (2D) projection of 2002 TC_{302} in the sky. For example, an oblate spheroid in 3D space would appear as an ellipse when projected in 2D.); (543.2±18) × (459.5±11) km (2018)
- Mean diameter: 500.3±2.5 km (2021) (Note: The mean (area equivalent) diameter of 2002 TC_{302} is calculated from the area of its 2D-projected ellipse.); 499.6±10.2 km (2018)
- Synodic rotation period: 56.0642 h
- Geometric albedo: 0.147±0.005
- Temperature: 43.9 K (perihelion)
- Spectral type: organics/methanol-type ("Cliff1"); RR ("very red"); B–V = 1.03±0.02; V–R = 0.67±0.02
- Apparent magnitude: 20.4
- Absolute magnitude (H): 4.23±0.10 (2016); 3.92 (JPL/MPC)

(84522) 2002 TC_{302} is an unnamed trans-Neptunian object in the scattered disk, orbiting the Sun on a highly distant and elliptical orbit. It is in a 2:5 orbital resonance with Neptune, meaning its orbital period is exactly 5/2 times that of Neptune's. It was discovered at Palomar Observatory on 9 October 2002, during a search for trans-Neptunian objects by Chad Trujillo, Michael E. Brown, and the Near-Earth Asteroid Tracking program. The object measures approximately 500 km (310 mi) in diameter and has a shape resembling a flattened sphere, making it a possible dwarf planet.

2002 TC_{302} has a cold and icy surface made of frozen water, carbon dioxide, carbon monoxide, methanol, and various complex organic compounds. These complex organic compounds, called tholins, color the object's surface red (Note: In planetary astronomy, the term "red" is used to describe objects that reflect more light at longer (redder) wavelengths, but does not necessarily mean "literally red". For example, astronomers have called Pluto "red", even though it appears brown to the human eye.) and are thought to be byproducts of ice irradiated by solar and cosmic rays. 2002 TC_{302} rotates slowly, with a rotation period of approximately 56 hours, and may possess a large unresolved moon based on indirect evidence from telescope observations.

== Observational history ==
=== Discovery ===
2002 TC_{302} was discovered on 9 October 2002 by Palomar Observatory in California, United States. At the time, Chad Trujillo and Michael E. Brown were searching for trans-Neptunian objects using the observatory's 1.2-meter Samuel Oschin telescope. Their search had been operating jointly with the Near-Earth Asteroid Tracking (NEAT) program, which contributed to the discovery of 2002 TC_{302} using the same telescope. The discovery of 2002 TC_{302} was announced by the Minor Planet Center (MPC) on 7 November 2002, after several observatories reobserved the object during that month.

When the discovery of 2002 TC_{302} was announced, its orbit was still poorly constrained due to the small number of observations recorded. This was resolved on 11 December 2002, when the MPC announced the first report of precovery observations for 2002 TC_{302}. These precovery images, which were found by Reiner Stoss, came from NEAT observations taken as early as 5 August 2000 (more than two years before the object's official discovery). These remain as the earliest known precoveries of 2002 TC_{302}.

=== Occultations ===
In the sky, 2002 TC_{302} may pass in front of a star and block out its light from Earth, producing a stellar occultation. Stellar occultations allow astronomers to accurately determine the size, shape, and position of 2002 TC_{302}. Although stellar occultations by 2002 TC_{302} were first predicted in 2013, they were not successfully observed until after 2018. The first successful observation of an occultation by 2002 TC_{302} took place on 28 January 2018, when it was detected by 12 telescopes across Europe. This occultation provided the first accurate determination of the object's size and shape. Another occultation by 2002 TC_{302} took place on 11 November 2021 and was detected by 19 telescopes across Europe and the United States, producing measurements in agreement with those from the previous occultation.

== Name ==
This object is currently known by its minor planet provisional designation 2002 TC_{302}, given by the MPC upon its discovery. The MPC gave it the minor planet number of 84522 on 4 May 2004. As of May 2026, it has not been named. According to naming guidelines by the International Astronomical Union's Working Group for Small Bodies Nomenclature, trans-Neptunian objects should be given mythological names.

== Orbit ==
2002 TC_{302} is a trans-Neptunian object (TNO) located in the scattered disk, a region of the Solar System beyond the orbits of Neptune and Pluto. It follows a highly tilted and elliptical orbit around the Sun (eccentricity 0.29, inclination 35°) at a distance ranging from 39.0 to 71.5 astronomical units (AU). With a semi-major axis or average distance of 55.3 AU, 2002 TC_{302} takes 411 years to complete one orbit around the Sun. The orbital period of 2002 TC_{302} is exactly 5/2 (or 2.5) times Neptune's orbital period, which means it is in a 2:5 mean-motion resonance with Neptune: for every two revolutions 2002 TC_{302} makes around the Sun, Neptune makes exactly five. The 2:5 resonance with Neptune is one of the most common types of orbital resonances seen in the TNO population. (Note: Other common orbital resonances in the TNO population include 1:1 (Neptune trojans), 2:3 (plutinos), and 1:2 (twotinos).)

Due to the orbital resonance, Neptune's gravity strongly affects the orbit of 2002 TC_{302}, particularly in terms of its eccentricity. Simulations of 2002 TC_{302}'s orbit show that in 10 million years, its semi-major axis can fluctuate between 54.7–56.4 AU, eccentricity between 0.29–0.45, and inclination between 29.2–35.0°. Despite this variability, 2002 TC_{302} has a high probability of remaining locked in its resonance, remaining in a stable orbit (without being ejected or falling into the inner Solar System) for at least 5 billion years—longer than the lifetime of the Solar System itself. As of May 2026, 2002 TC_{302} is located above the ecliptic at a distance of 42.7 AU from the Sun. It will come to perihelion, its closest distance to the Sun, in October 2058.

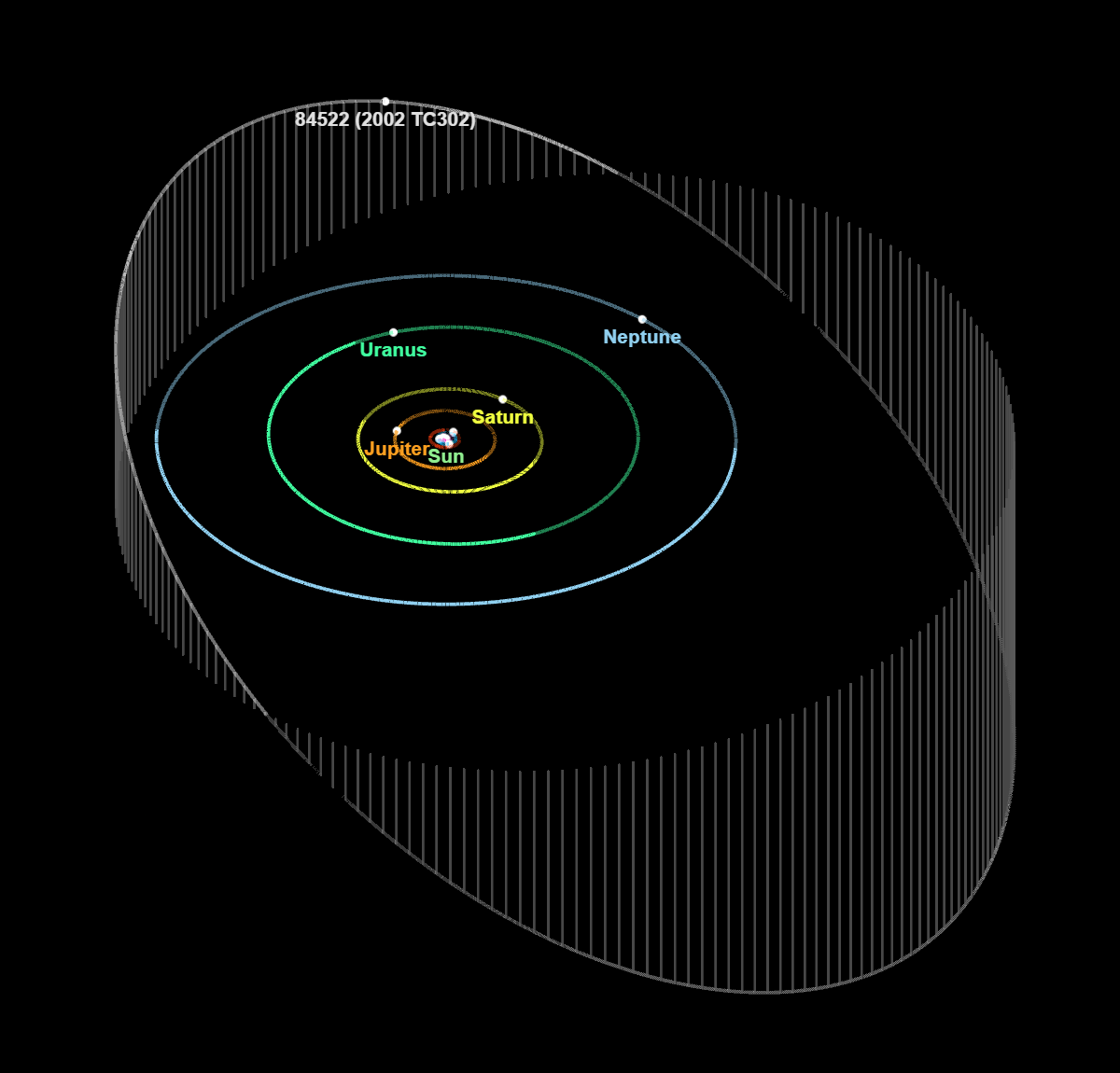
Diagram showing the highly tilted orbit of 2002 TC_{302} (white) compared to the Solar System's outer planets. Positions of objects are shown on the date 24 May 2026.

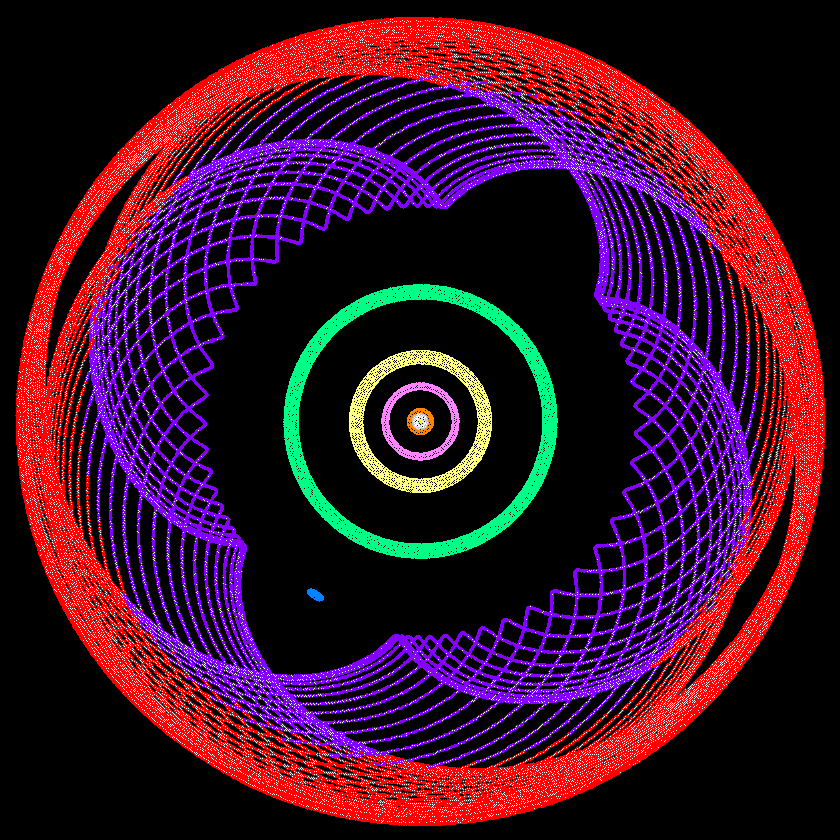
When viewed in a frame rotating with Neptune's orbit, 2002 TC_{302} appears to follow an epicyclic path around the Sun (colored red and purple).

== Physical characteristics ==
=== Size and shape ===
Size comparison of 2002 TC_{302}, Pluto, and the asteroid Vesta. The oblate shape and red color of 2002 TC_{302} is depicted here.

History of diameter estimates for 2002 TC_{302}
Year of Publication	Diameter (km)	Method	References
2004	<1195	thermal (IRAM)	
2005	<1211	thermal (IRAM)	
2008	1150+337 −325	thermal (Spitzer)	
2013	584+105 −88	thermal (Spitzer+Herschel)	
2020	499.6±10.2	occultation (28 Jan 2018)	
2022	500.3±2.5	occultation (11 Nov 2021)	

2002 TC_{302} has a mean diameter of approximately 500 km (310 mi), about one-fifth the diameter of Pluto. (Note: Pluto has a radius of 1,188 km (738 mi), or a diameter of 2,376 km (1,476 mi). One-fifth of Pluto's diameter is 475 km (295 mi).) It is considered a medium-sized or mid-sized TNO, since its diameter lies halfway between those of small, irregularly-shaped bodies and dwarf planets. Stellar occultation observations from 2018 have shown that the shape of 2002 TC_{302} likely resembles an oblate spheroid, with a major diameter of 543 ± 18 km (337 ± 11 mi) and a minor diameter of 460 ± 11 km (285.8 ± 6.8 mi). A preliminary analysis of another occultation from 2021 found a similar major diameter of 530 km (330 mi) and a minor diameter of 469 km (291 mi).

2002 TC_{302} is theoretically massive enough to gravitationally pull itself into a spherical or ellipsoidal shape, which would result in hydrostatic equilibrium. Since this is one of the requirements for becoming a dwarf planet, some astronomers including Michael E. Brown and Noemi Pinilla-Alonso have considered it a possible dwarf planet. However, occultation observations have not ruled out irregularities in 2002 TC_{302}'s shape, and its unknown density makes it unclear whether its observed oblate shape is consistent with hydrostatic equilibrium.

2002 TC_{302} was previously considered one of the largest known TNOs during the 2000s. Early measurements of 2002 TC_{302}'s thermal emission suggested that its diameter could be as large as 1,200 km (750 mi), which would have made it half the size of Pluto. After 2002 TC_{302}'s diameter was revised downward in 2020, it is now recognized that the initial overestimate of 2002 TC_{302}'s diameter was likely caused an unseen moon making it appear larger and brighter than it actually is.

=== Mass and density ===
The mass and density of 2002 TC_{302} have not been measured. These properties could be determined if it has a moon with a known orbital period and distance. In spite of this, astronomers have inferred 2002 TC_{302}'s density from its diameter, shape, and rotation period. Based on the known densities of TNOs around 2002 TC_{302}'s size, its density is predicted to be around 0.8 g/cm^{3}. On the other hand, if 2002 TC_{302} is in hydrostatic equilibrium and is rotating rapidly, its density could be at least 1.15 g/cm^{3}. Both predicted densities are relatively low for TNOs, which could indicate a porous interior made of ice and rock.

=== Surface ===
==== Composition and spectrum ====
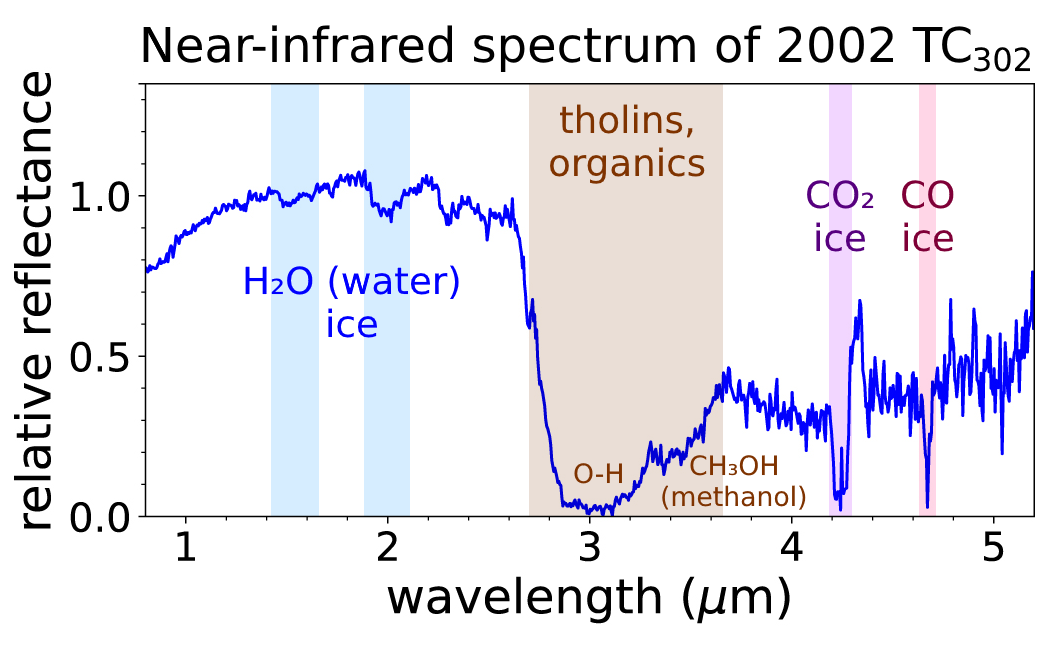
The near-infrared spectrum of 2002 TC_{302}, measured by JWST's NIRSpec instrument. Absorption signatures of chemical compounds are highlighted and labeled with their respective names.

The surface of 2002 TC_{302} is very cold, with temperatures reaching as high as 44 K (−229.2 °C; −380.5 °F) at perihelion. Under these conditions, most substances such as water and carbon dioxide remain frozen. Near-infrared spectroscopy by the James Webb Space Telescope (JWST) has identified frozen water, carbon dioxide (CO_{2}), carbon monoxide (CO), methanol (CH_{3}OH), and large amounts of complex organic compounds (tholins) on the object's surface. This organic-rich composition makes 2002 TC_{302}'s surface highly absorbent at near-infrared wavelengths between 2 and 3 μm, producing a "cliff"-shaped reflectance spectrum. For this reason, astronomers classify 2002 TC_{302} as an organics-type or "cliff"-type TNO. 2002 TC_{302} is richer in methanol compared to other "cliff"-type TNOs, so it is further categorized as a "cliff1"-type or methanol-rich TNO.

A 2026 analysis of 2002 TC_{302}'s near-infrared spectrum, led by Lucas McClure and colleagues, suggested that the object's tholins and methanol ice exist in the form of grains between 10 and 20 μm in size. Each of these grains is hypothesized to be embedded with trace amounts (<2% by weight) of amorphous carbon and crystalline water ice, respectively. McClure and colleagues further proposed that 2002 TC_{302}'s water ice predominantly exists as amorphous 5 μm-sized grains containing some embedded CO_{2} ice. On the other hand, a 2023 analysis by Michael E. Brown and Wesley C. Fraser pointed out that CO_{2} absorbs more light than water ice in 2002 TC_{302}'s spectrum, and proposed that its water ice is coated by a thin layer of 1–2 μm-sized CO_{2} ice particles.

Like many other TNOs, 2002 TC_{302} contains more CO ice than expected for its temperature, where CO would ordinarily sublimate and escape. Astronomers hypothesize that the abundant CO in TNOs comes from the irradiation of CO_{2} and methanol through solar and cosmic rays, which break these molecules into CO and other hydrocarbons. The continued irradiation of these resulting hydrocarbons is also thought to produce tholins, which are commonly seen in TNOs. The observed abundances of CO, CO_{2}, and other hydrocarbons on 2002 TC_{302} may be related to its distant orbit, which brings it near the termination shock 80–90 AU from the Sun and exposes it to higher levels of radiation.

==== Color and albedo ====
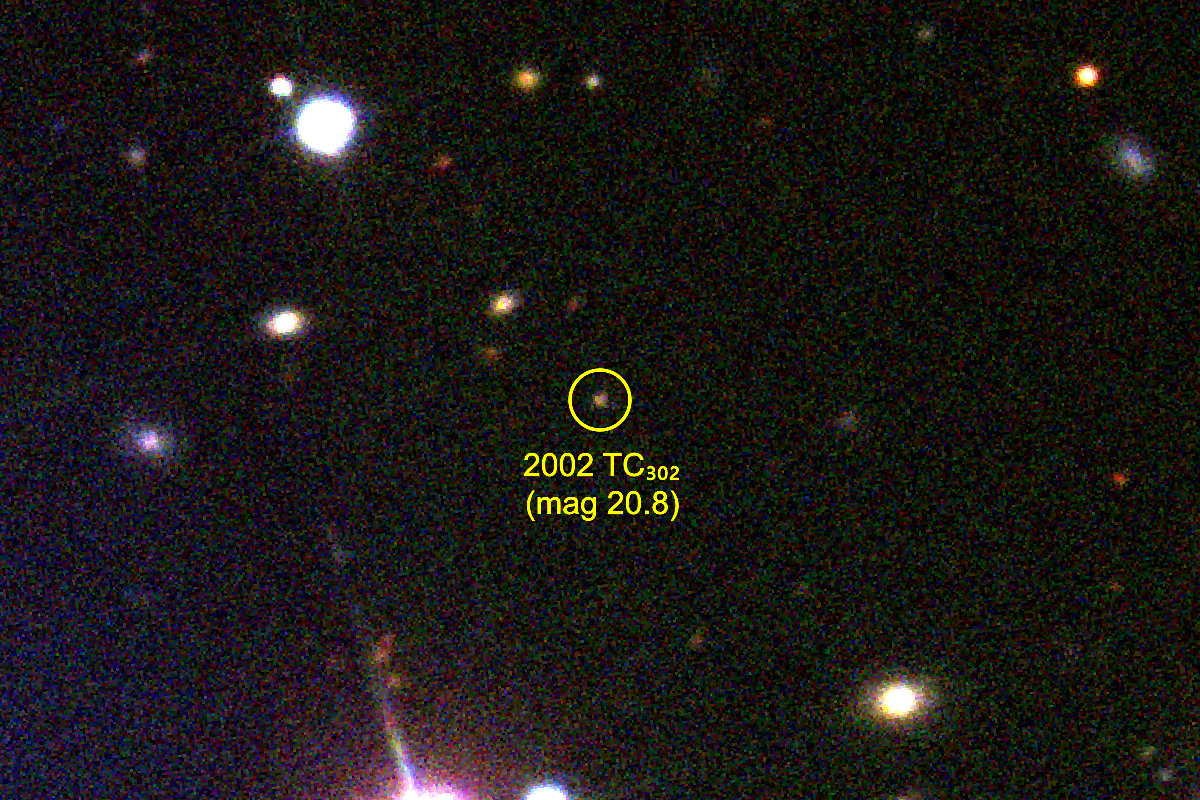
Color photograph of 2002 TC_{302} in visible light, taken by the Sloan Digital Sky Survey on 21 January 2009

In visible light, 2002 TC_{302} appears dim and red. Astronomers describe its color as "very red" or "ultra red" in comparison to other TNOs. Like all red TNOs, the red coloration of 2002 TC_{302} is thought to be caused by tholins on its surface. Very red colors appear to be common among TNOs on highly distant and eccentric orbits like that of 2002 TC_{302}, though they are mainly found in the low-inclination ("cold") classical Kuiper belt closer to the Sun.

Based on its brightness and known size, the object's geometric albedo is estimated to be 0.147±0.005, which is somewhat high compared to other mid-sized TNOs. 2002 TC_{302}'s apparently high geometric albedo may be caused by either exposed water ice on its surface, or a hidden moon making it appear brighter than usual. If it has a hidden moon, its true geometric albedo would be around 0.127, closer to the average TNO albedo. The albedo is thought to vary across 2002 TC_{302}'s surface because it shows slight variability in brightness as it rotates.

=== Rotation ===
As it rotates, 2002 TC_{302} exhibits slight brightness variability with an amplitude of 0.06±0.01 magnitudes. This small brightness variability makes its rotation period difficult to measure with telescopes. Measurements as of 2020 suggest that 2002 TC_{302} rotates slowly, with a period of approximately 56.1 hours. Earlier studies proposed a rotation period of 5.41 hours, but this is now considered unlikely because observational methods tend to favor the detection of shorter periods. The axial tilt of 2002 TC_{302} is unknown, as its three-dimensional shape has not been determined through a sufficient number of occultations.

=== Lack of atmosphere ===
Occultation observations from 2018 have shown that 2002 TC_{302} lacks a global atmosphere or a dust coma. The lack of an atmosphere is consistent with theoretical predictions that TNOs smaller than 2,000 km (1,200 mi) in diameter generally cannot gravitationally hold onto atmospheres over billion-year timescales. If 2002 TC_{302} has an undetected atmosphere, the atmospheric pressure at its surface must be less than 100 nanobars.

== Possible satellite ==
2002 TC_{302} is not confirmed to have natural satellites or moons, although there is indirect evidence for one orbiting close by. Beginning in 2020, astronomers noticed that 2002 TC_{302} emits more thermal radiation than expected for its size. 2002 TC_{302}'s excess thermal emission does not fit models of a single, highly emissive object, but could be explained by the presence of a thermally-emitting moon. Based on the difference between 2002 TC_{302}'s measured and predicted thermal emission, the diameter of the possible moon is inferred to be 272+114
−92 km (169+71
−57 mi), or about half the diameter of 2002 TC_{302}. Such a large moon would make 2002 TC_{302} a binary system, likely formed through streaming instability or an impact.

The unusually high albedo and slow rotation of 2002 TC_{302} provide further evidence for the presence of a large moon. If 2002 TC_{302} has a lower albedo more typical of TNOs, then it would appear brighter than expected; this excess brightness could be explained by large, unresolved moon. A 200 km-diameter moon with the same albedo as 2002 TC_{302} would account for roughly 16% of the object's total brightness. The putative moon would likely be irregularly shaped, meaning it would cause significant brightness variations as it rotates. It may therefore be primarily responsible for 2002 TC_{302}'s observed brightness variability, since 2002 TC_{302} by itself is expected to show little variation because of its nearly spherical shape.

2002 TC_{302}'s slow rotation period of 56.1 hours can be explained if it is tidally locked to a massive moon orbiting with the same period. Assuming a density of 0.8 g/cm^{3} for 2002 TC_{302}, the putative moon would orbit at a distance of about 1,780 km (1,110 mi). From Earth, this corresponds to a maximum angular separation of 58 milliarcseconds, which is barely resolvable by modern telescopes like the Hubble Space Telescope and James Webb Space Telescope. The moon's orbital motion is predicted to shift 2002 TC_{302}'s apparent position by 14 milliarcseconds.

Observations from stellar occultations and direct imaging with the Hubble Space Telescope have searched the region surrounding 2002 TC_{302} but did not find any moons or rings wider than 7 km (4.3 mi). These observations likely lacked sufficient resolution to detect the hypothesized moon. Future observations of stellar occultations may be capable of detecting it.

== Origin ==
Methanol- and organic-rich TNOs like 2002 TC_{302} are thought to have formed in the Sun's outer protoplanetary disk 4.5 billion years ago, at heliocentric distances beyond 20 AU where methanol, CO, and CO_{2} could solidify into ices. These ices presumably accreted into solid bodies until the protoplanetary disk dissipated, leaving behind planetesimals. According to Solar System evolution models as of 2020, these planetesimals underwent significant orbital evolution within 10 million years after the disk's dissipation, when the giant planets began migrating outward. The migrating giant planets gravitationally scattered many of the planetesimals onto distant and eccentric orbits, where they currently remain as TNOs.

Many aspects in the evolutionary history of organic-rich TNOs are uncertain, however, especially regarding how they obtained their current composition. It is unclear why organic-rich TNOs only have two groups of methanol abundances, which do not correlate with their current orbital classifications. A 2025 study led by Rosario Brunetto and colleagues proposed two possible explanations for the dichotomy of methanol abundances:

1. These TNOs formed in methanol-rich and methanol-poor regions at different distances from the Sun.
2. These TNOs formed at around the same distance with the same amount of methanol, but experienced different environments and changes that altered their compositions differently.

== Exploration concepts ==
2002 TC_{302} has not been visited by a space probe. Although sending space probes to TNOs is expensive, their exploration is highly valuable for understanding the nature of TNOs and the history of Solar System. A 2013 study by the University of Tennessee identified several launch windows in 2020, 2033, and 2045 where a spacecraft could be launched to 2002 TC_{302}, using a high-thrust Atlas V 551 rocket with a Star 48 upper stage and a gravity assist from Jupiter. For these launch dates, a spacecraft could either perform a flyby of 2002 TC_{302} in 10 to 15 years, or enter orbit around 2002 TC_{302} in 20–25 years.

A 2019 study led by Amanda Zangari and colleagues identified additional possible flyby trajectories to 2002 TC_{302}, exploiting gravity assists from other planets. With a single Jupiter gravity assist, a spacecraft launched in 2032–2036 could reach the object in 9.2–12.9 years. With two gravity assists from Jupiter and Uranus, a spacecraft launched in 2036 could flyby in 24.1–24.3 years. With a single Saturn gravity assist, a spacecraft launched in 2025–2033 could flyby in 10.3–17.8 years. Lastly, with two gravity assists from Saturn and Uranus, a spacecraft launched in 2026–2032 could flyby in 18.9–22.5 years.

== See also ==
- 38628 Huya, a binary mid-sized plutino with a large and closely-orbiting moon, similar to the one predicted for 2002 TC_{302}
- (84922) 2003 VS2, a similarly-sized TNO whose shape has been characterized by stellar occultations
- (119951) 2002 KX14, another similarly-sized TNO whose shape has been characterized by stellar occultations
- (612533) 2002 XV93, a similarly-sized TNO discovered to have an atmosphere in stellar occultation observations
