= (84922) 2003 VS2 =

Elongated plutino

(84922) 2003 VS_{2}
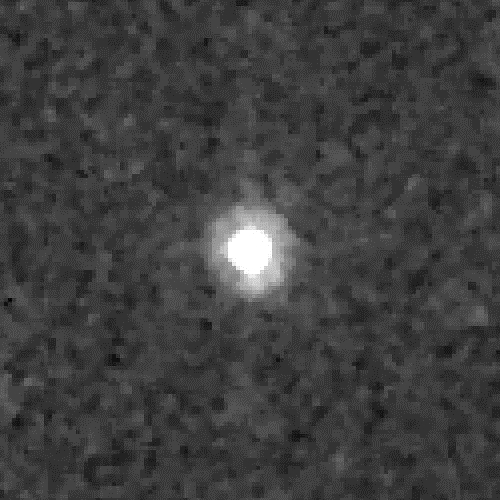
- 2003 VS_{2} photographed by the Hubble Space Telescope in 2005

Discovery
- Discovered by: NEAT
- Discovery site: Palomar Observatory
- Discovery date: 14 November 2003

Designations
- Alternative designations: 3A86VCM
- Minor planet category: TNO · plutino · distant

Orbital characteristics (barycentric) (Note: These orbital elements are expressed in terms of the Solar System Barycenter (SSB) as the frame of reference. Due to planetary perturbations, the Sun revolves around the SSB at non-negligible distances, so heliocentric-frame orbital elements and distances (such as those given in JPL's Small-Body Database) can vary on short timescales.)
- Epoch 21 November 2025 (JD 2461000.5)
- Uncertainty parameter 0
- Observation arc: 34+ yr
- Earliest precovery date: 17 September 1991
- Aphelion: 42.414 AU
- Perihelion: 36.432 AU
- Semi-major axis: 39.423 AU
- Eccentricity: 0.07587
- Orbital period (sidereal): 247.36 yr (90,349 d)
- Mean anomaly: 31.436°
- Mean motion: 0° 0^{m} 14.344^{s} / day
- Inclination: 14.790°
- Longitude of ascending node: 302.723°
- Time of perihelion: 8 March 2005 ± 0.11 days
- Argument of perihelion: 112.563°
- Known satellites: 0

Physical characteristics
- Dimensions: (678±10) × (470±12) × (452±16) km
- Mean diameter: 524±7 km (volume equiv.)
- Mean density: 1.4+1.0 −0.3 g/cm^{3}
- Synodic rotation period: 7.4175285±0.00001 h
- Pole ecliptic longitude: 228°
- Pole ecliptic latitude: +39°
- Geometric albedo: 0.134±0.010
- Temperature: 40 K
- Spectral type: (moderately red); B−V = 0.93±0.02; V−R = 0.59±0.02
- Apparent magnitude: 19.8
- Absolute magnitude (H): 4.14±0.07 (rotational avg.)

(84922) 2003 VS_{2} is an unnamed trans-Neptunian object (TNO) in the Kuiper belt. It is a member of the plutinos, a population of TNOs in a 2:3 orbital resonance with Neptune, like Pluto. It was discovered by the Near-Earth Asteroid Tracking program at Palomar Observatory on 14 November 2003. It is an elongated object with a diameter measuring 678 km (421 mi) across its longest axis to 452 km (281 mi) across its shortest.

== Discovery ==
2003 VS_{2} was discovered by the NASA-funded Near-Earth Asteroid Tracking (NEAT) project on 14 November 2003, during routine observations of the sky at Palomar Observatory in California, United States. The discovery observations were made using the observatory's 48-inch (1.2 m) Samuel Oschin telescope, which was equipped with a charge-coupled device camera. Astronomers of the project flagged 2003 VS_{2} as an "interesting object" because it moved much slower than near-Earth objects that NEAT was tasked to find. The object was listed on the Minor Planet Center's (MPC's) Near-Earth Object Confirmation Page, which prompted follow-up observations from other observatories.

Within two days after the discovery of 2003 VS_{2}, astronomers began finding precoveries of the object in older NEAT images. Precoveries were first found by Maik Meyer in images from late 2002, and then by Sebastian Hönig in images from 1998, 2001, and 2002. These extra observations allowed astronomers to determine the orbit of 2003 VS_{2}. The discovery and confirmation of 2003 VS_{2} was announced by the MPC on 16 November 2003. Subsequent reports of the discovery, including those from the NEAT project, recognized 2003 VS_{2} as one of the largest trans-Neptunian objects found.

On the day after the MPC's announcement of 2003 VS_{2}, astronomer Reiner Stoss reported more precoveries from Palomar Observatory's Digitized Sky Survey, whose images were taken even earlier in 1991 and 1993. The earliest of these precoveries was taken on 17 September 1991. These precoveries were independently found by Andrew Lowe and Rob Matson around the same time as Stoss.

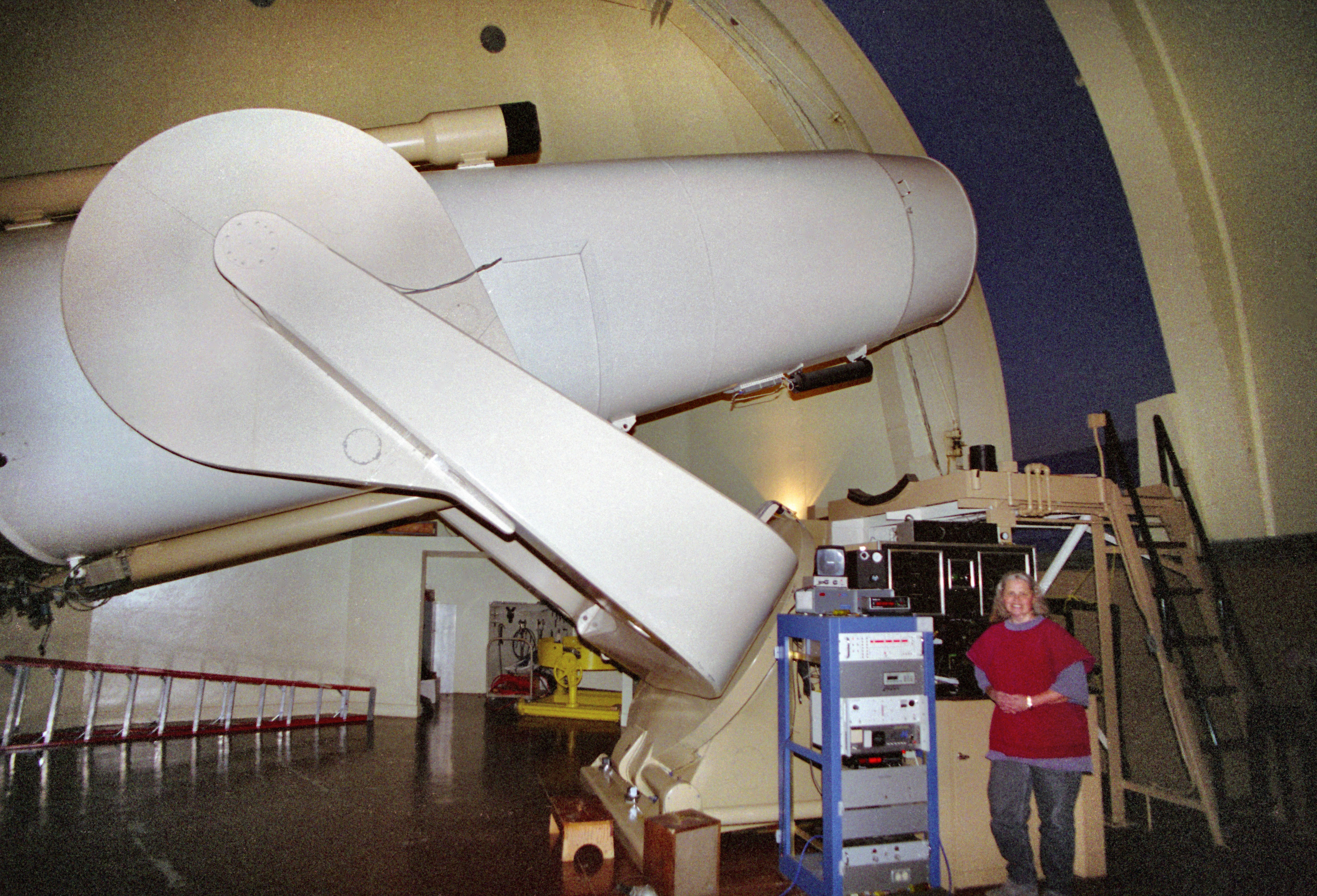
2003 VS_{2} was discovered by the 48-inch (1.2 m) Samuel Oschin telescope at Palomar Observatory.

NEAT discovery photos of 2003 VS_{2}, showing the object moving slowly over one hour

== Name ==
This object is currently known by its minor planet provisional designation 2003 VS_{2}, which was given by the MPC upon its discovery. The provisional designation encodes the object's time and order of discovery. The MPC gave it the minor planet number (84922) on 4 May 2004. When it was discovered, the object was initially codenamed "3A86VCM" by the NEAT project. (Note: The NEAT project's six-character alphanumeric codename encodes the object's time of observation and number.) As of May 2026, it has not been named. According to naming guidelines by the International Astronomical Union's Working Group for Small Bodies Nomenclature, trans-Neptunian objects classified as plutinos should be given mythological names related to the underworld.

== Orbit ==
2003 VS_{2} orbits the Sun with a semi-major axis of 39.4 astronomical units (AU), putting it in the Kuiper belt beyond Neptune's orbit. 2003 VS_{2} takes 247 years to complete one orbit, which places it in a 2:3 mean-motion resonance with Neptune. For every two revolutions it makes around the Sun, Neptune makes exactly three. It is therefore a member of the plutinos, a large population of trans-Neptunian objects (TNOs) named after its largest member Pluto.

2003 VS_{2} has a nearly circular orbit with a low eccentricity of 0.08. Its orbit is inclined by 14.8° with respect to the ecliptic. Throughout its orbit, the object's distance from the Sun ranges from 36.4 AU at perihelion to 42.4 AU at aphelion. 2003 VS_{2} had passed perihelion on 8 March 2005. Due to gravitational perturbations by the giant planets, the orbital elements of 2003 VS_{2} vary over time. Simulations of 2003 VS_{2}'s orbit show that in 10 million years, its semi-major axis can fluctuate between 39.1–39.8 AU, eccentricity between 0.05–0.11, and inclination between 15.4–16.8°. Despite this variability, the orbit of 2003 VS_{2} remains stable for billions of years.

== Physical characteristics ==
=== Size and shape ===
In 2007, its diameter was initially estimated by the Spitzer Space Telescope at 725±200 km. However, in 2012, this was reduced to 523.0+35.1
−34.4 km after new Herschel Space Telescope observations. In 2019, 2003 VS_{2} was found to be ellipsoidal in shape based on stellar occultations that occurred in 2013 and 2014; the light curve derived from the occultations suggests that this plutino is not in hydrostatic equilibrium and hence not a dwarf planet. The dimensions of 2003 VS_{2} are estimated at 627.6 km × 531 km × 494.6 km, with a volume-equivalent diameter of 548.3+29.5
−44.6 km.

Further observations of occultations refined the estimate to (678±10) × (470±12) × (452±16) km, with a mean diameter of 524±7 km.

2003 VS_{2} has no known satellite that can be used to directly determine its mass, but assuming a density of 1 g/cm^{3}, typical of mid size TNOs, gives a mass estimate of about 6.5×10^{19} kg. it has an estimated density of 1.4+1.0
−0.3 g/cm^{3}, if assuming that it is a Maclaurin Spheroid.

=== Surface ===
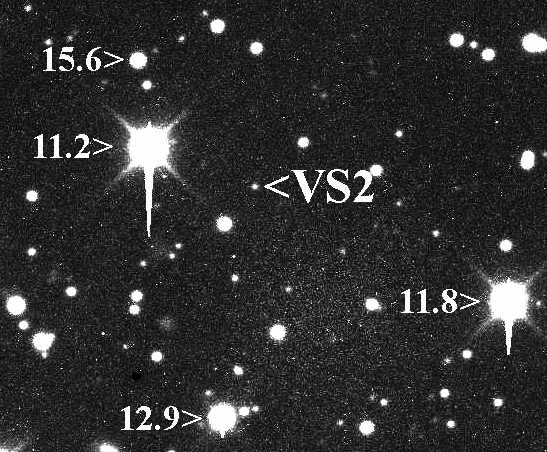
2003 VS_{2} (apparent magnitude 19.8) photographed with a 24-inch telescope. Surrounding stars are labeled with their apparent magnitude values for comparison.

2003 VS_{2} has a moderately red surface with a moderately red color indices B−V=0.93, V−R=0.59. Its geometrical albedo is about 0.13.

=== Rotation ===
2003 VS_{2} rotates with a period of approximately 7.42 hours, measured to an accuracy of 0.04 seconds. It has a high light curve amplitude of 0.21±0.01, indicative of an elongated, non-spherical shape.

== See also ==
- 90377 Sedna – a dwarf planet discovered on the same day as 2003 VS_{2} (14 November 2003)
- 208996 Achlys – a large plutino and possible dwarf planet with an elongated ellipsoid shape
- (84522) 2002 TC302 – a similarly-sized trans-Neptunian object whose shape has been characterized by stellar occultations
- (119951) 2002 KX14 – another similarly-sized trans-Neptunian object whose shape has been characterized by stellar occultations
- (612533) 2002 XV93 – a similarly-sized plutino discovered to have an atmosphere in stellar occultation observations
