= (119951) 2002 KX14 =

Classical Kuiper belt object

(119951) 2002 KX_{14}
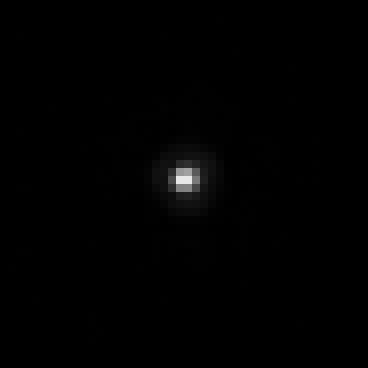
- 2002 KX_{14} imaged by the Hubble Space Telescope on 7 April 2006

Discovery
- Discovered by: Chadwick A. Trujillo; Michael E. Brown
- Discovery site: Palomar Obs.
- Discovery date: 17 May 2002

Designations
- Minor planet category: TNO · classical (inner/cold) distant

Orbital characteristics (barycentric)
- Epoch 25 February 2023 (JD 2460000.5)
- Uncertainty parameter 2
- Observation arc: 38.96 yr (14,230 d)
- Earliest precovery date: 31 May 1984
- Aphelion: 40.515 AU
- Perihelion: 37.055 AU
- Semi-major axis: 38.785 AU
- Eccentricity: 0.04461
- Orbital period (sidereal): 241.39 yr (88,166 d)
- Mean anomaly: 270.086°
- Mean motion: 0° 0^{m} 14.7^{s} / day
- Inclination: 0.403°
- Longitude of ascending node: 286.795°
- Time of perihelion: ≈ 30 May 2085 ±3.0 days
- Argument of perihelion: 73.695°
- Known satellites: 0 (1 unconfirmed)

Physical characteristics
- Dimensions: (482.0±14.4 km) × (314.2±10.4 km) (projected)
- Mean diameter: 389.2±8.7 km (area equivalent)
- Geometric albedo: 0.119±0.007
- Temperature: 30–50 K
- Spectral type: IR–RR (red); B−V = 1.05±0.03; V−R = 0.61±0.02
- Apparent magnitude: 20.8
- Absolute magnitude (H): 4.978±0.017 (2016); 4.862±0.038 (2012); 4.71 (JPL)

(119951) 2002 KX_{14} is a trans-Neptunian object located in the inner classical Kuiper belt. It was discovered on 17 May 2002 by Michael E. Brown and Chad Trujillo at Palomar Observatory, during a search for Pluto-sized objects beyond the orbit of Neptune. Observations have shown that 2002 KX_{14} is a highly flattened object with an equatorial diameter of 482 km (300 mi) and a maximum polar diameter of 314 km (195 mi). The surface of 2002 KX_{14} is dark and reddish, likely because it is covered with tholins. The object is suspected to have one large moon, although it has not been confirmed with direct observations.

== History ==
=== Discovery ===
2002 KX_{14} was discovered on 17 May 2002 by astronomers Chad Trujillo and Michael Brown at Palomar Observatory in San Diego County, California, United States. The discovery formed part of their Caltech Wide Area Sky Survey for bright, Pluto-sized Kuiper belt objects using the observatory's 1.22-meter (48 in) Samuel Oschin telescope with its wide-field CCD camera, which was operated jointly with the nightly Near Earth Asteroid Tracking program at Palomar. This survey was responsible for the discovery of several other large objects beyond Neptune, which includes the dwarf planets Eris, Sedna, and Quaoar.

2002 KX_{14} was found through manual vetting of potential moving objects identified by the team's automatic image-searching software. It was detected at a red-filter apparent magnitude of 20.6, marginally brighter than the survey's limiting magnitude of 20.7. Follow-up observations were conducted one month later with Palomar Observatory's 1.52-meter (60 in) telescope on 13–14 June 2002. The discovery was announced by the Minor Planet Center on 20 July 2002 and the object was given the minor planet provisional designation of 2002 KX_{14}.

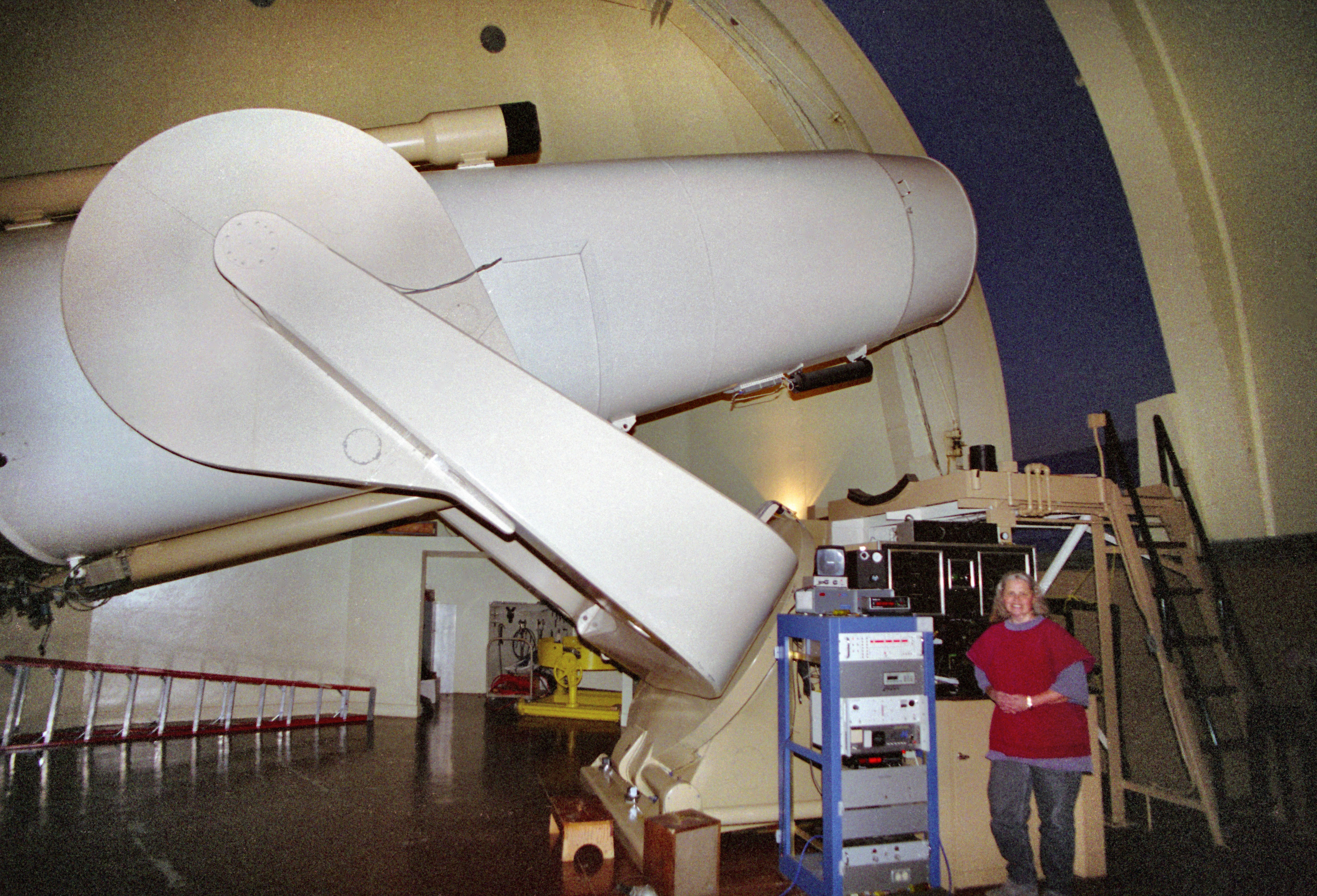
The 1.2-meter Samuel Oschin telescope that was used to discover 2002 KX_{14} at Palomar Observatory

=== Further observations and occultations ===
After the publication of 2002 KX_{14}'s discovery, astronomers continued observing the object and identified additional observations from the time of or before its discovery. In particular, 2002 KX_{14} had been identified in pre-discovery observations by the Cerro Tololo Observatory from August 2001 and the Siding Spring Observatory's Digitized Sky Survey from May 1984 and April 1993. These additional observations helped reduce the uncertainty of 2002 KX_{14}'s orbit. As of 2025, 2002 KX_{14} has been observed for over 38 years, or about 16% of its orbital period.

As of 2026, 2002 KX_{14} is located in the Milky Way's galactic plane in the sky, where it is densely filled with stars. Although this crowded location complicates measurements of 2002 KX_{14}'s rotation period, it offers a higher chance of observing stellar occultations, where 2002 KX_{14} passes in front of a star. Stellar occultations allow astronomers to accurately measure the size, shape, and position of 2002 KX_{14}. The first stellar occultation by 2002 KX_{14} was observed on 26 April 2012 by the William Herschel Telescope at La Palma Observatory. From 2020 to 2023, five more stellar occultations were observed by multiple telescopes across Europe and the Americas.

=== Numbering and naming ===
2002 KX_{14} received its permanent minor planet catalog number of 119951 from the Minor Planet Center on 16 November 2005. 2002 KX_{14} does not have a proper name and the discoverers' privilege for naming this object has expired ten years after it was numbered. According to naming guidelines by the International Astronomical Union's Working Group for Small Bodies Nomenclature, 2002 KX_{14} is open for name suggestions that relate to creation myths, as encouraged for Kuiper belt objects in general.

== Orbit and classification ==
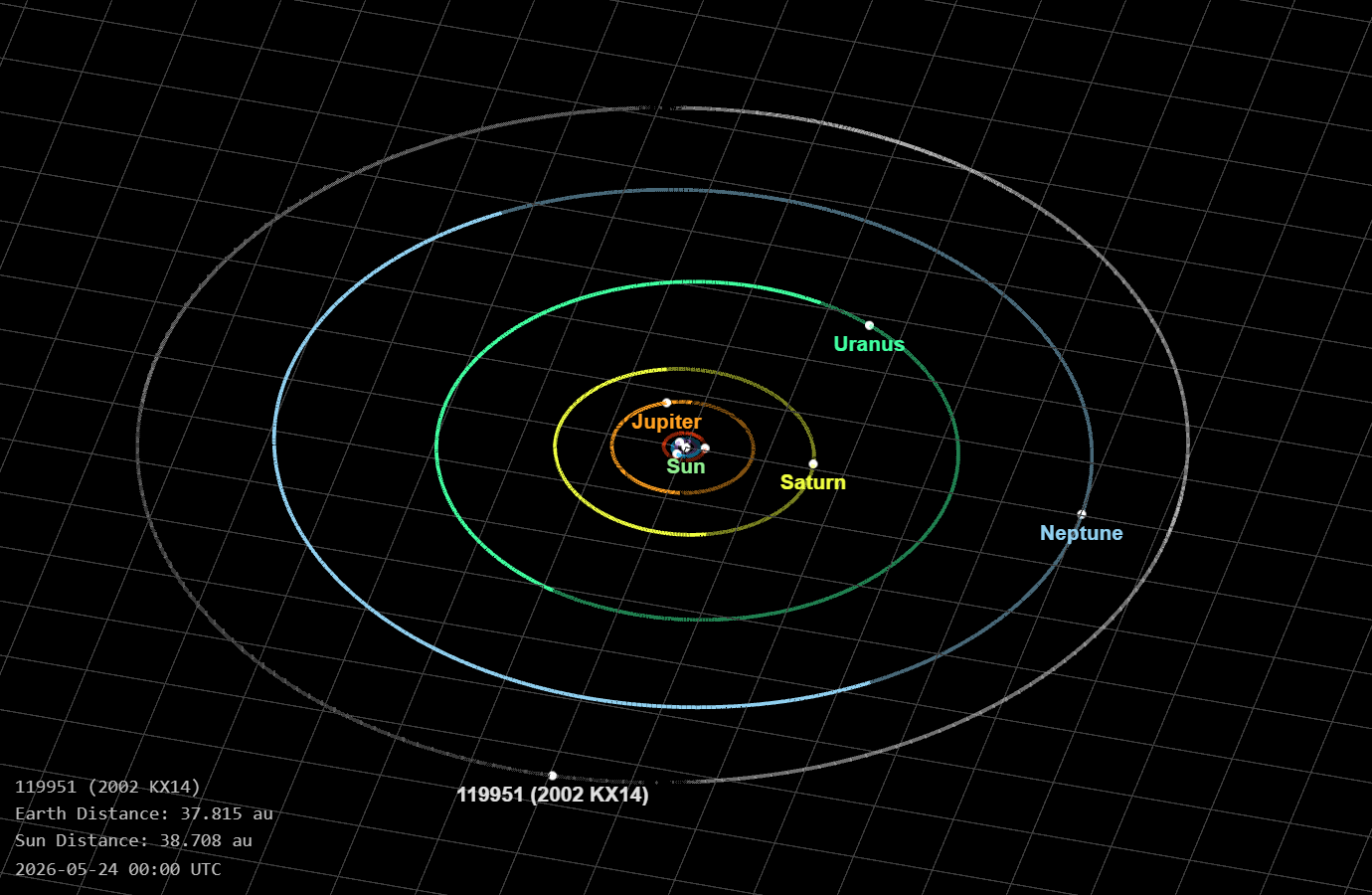
Diagram showing the orbits of 2002 KX_{14} (white) and the outer planets

2002 KX_{14} is a trans-Neptunian object (TNO) orbiting the Sun at a semi-major axis or average distance of 38.8 astronomical units (AU). (Note: These orbital elements are expressed in terms of the Solar System Barycenter (SSB) as the frame of reference. Due to planetary perturbations, the Sun revolves around the SSB at non-negligible distances, so heliocentric-frame orbital elements and distances can vary in short timescales as shown in JPL-Horizons.) Its orbit is nearly circular with a low orbital eccentricity of 0.04. In its 241-year-long orbit, 2002 KX_{14} comes within 37.1 AU from the Sun at perihelion and up to 40.5 AU at aphelion. It has a low orbital inclination of 0.4° with respect to the ecliptic, closely aligned with the orbits of the Solar System's planets. 2002 KX_{14} last passed perihelion in July 1840 and will make its next perihelion passage in May 2085.

2002 KX_{14}'s orbit is not resonant with Neptune and is located in the inner classical region of the Kuiper belt within 39.4 AU from the Sun, making it an inner classical Kuiper belt object (KBO). The 2:3 orbital resonance by Neptune (which contains the plutinos) separates the inner classical Kuiper belt from the main classical Kuiper belt (which spans 42–48 AU from the Sun). 2002 KX_{14}'s low orbital inclination and eccentricity qualifies it as a dynamically "cold" member of the classical Kuiper belt. Cold classical KBOs are believed to be primordial planetesimals whose orbits have remained relatively unchanged since their formation, although this may not apply to the inner classical Kuiper belt. Astronomer Esa Vilenius and collaborators argued that inner classical KBOs like 2002 KX_{14} more likely belong to the dynamically "hot" population of classical KBOs, especially if they have relatively large diameters. In contrast to cold classical KBOs, hot classical KBOs are typically found on inclined and eccentric orbits because they have been gravitationally scattered by Neptune's migration during the early Solar System.

== Physical characteristics ==
=== Size and shape ===
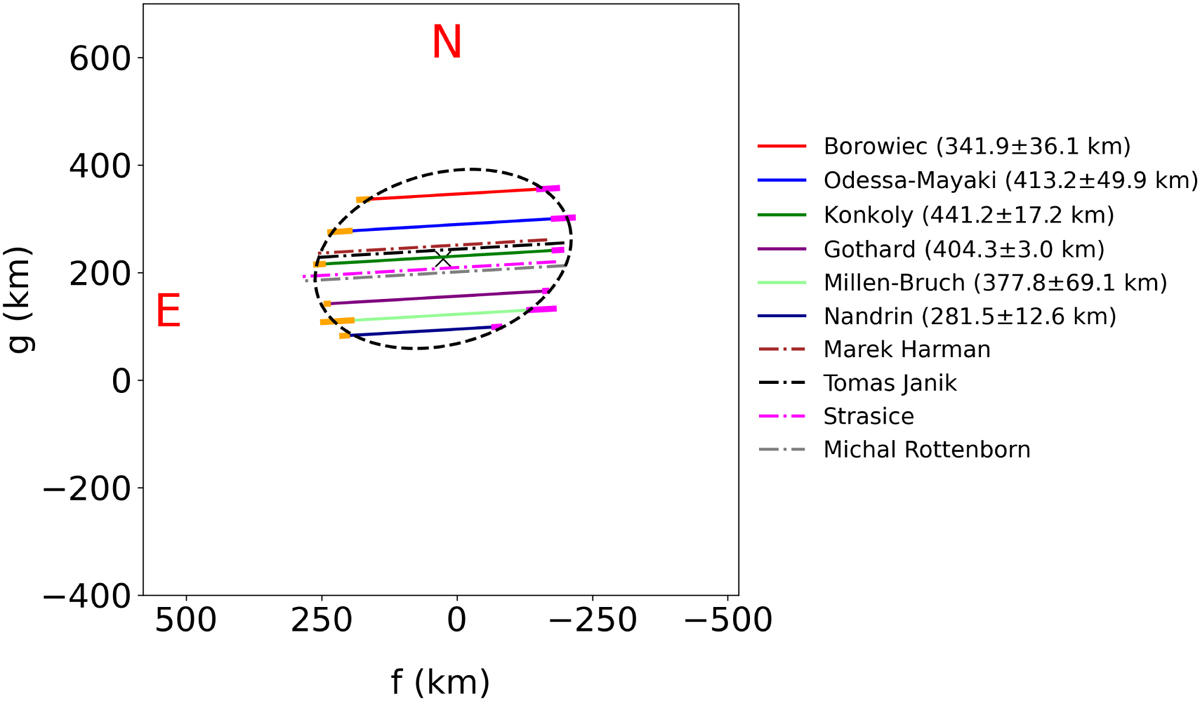
The oblate shape of 2002 KX_{14}, as seen in occultation observations from 26 May 2020

2002 KX_{14}, its unconfirmed moon and Vesta in a size comparison.

Observations of stellar occultations show that 2002 KX_{14} is a highly flattened object with an equatorial diameter of 482.0 ± 14.4 km (299.5 ± 8.9 mi) and a projected (maximum) polar diameter of 314.2 ± 10.4 km (195.2 ± 6.5 mi). It is one of the largest known cold classical KBOs. The projected shape of 2002 KX_{14} appeared constant in five different occultation observations from 2020 to 2023, which suggests it is shaped like an oblate spheroid. If 2002 KX_{14} is a Maclaurin spheroid (a self-gravitating fluid body in hydrostatic equilibrium) and has an average TNO rotation period of 7 hours, then it would have a density of 0.9 g/cm^{3}. However, this prediction for 2002 KX_{14}'s density cannot be confirmed as the object's rotation period is unknown and its true shape has not been confirmed.

=== Rotation ===
The rotation period of 2002 KX_{14} is unknown. Astronomers have attempted to photometrically measure 2002 KX_{14}'s rotation period by monitoring changes in its brightness over time (light curves), but were unable to find any significant brightness variations exceeding 0.05 magnitudes. If 2002 KX_{14} is spheroidal, its low brightness variations may be caused by surface albedo features rotating in and out of view. The photometric measurement of 2002 KX_{14}'s rotation is further complicated by the object's location in the sky overlapping with the Milky Way's dense star fields, where background stars can obscure the object.

=== Surface and spectrum ===
The surface of 2002 KX_{14} is dark and reddish in visible light, with a geometric albedo of 0.119. In Barucci et al.'s classification scheme for TNO color indices, 2002 KX_{14} either belongs to the IR or RR group of TNOs with "red" colors, which are common within the classical Kuiper belt population. Visible and near-infrared spectroscopy of 2002 KX_{14} by ground-based telescopes show that it has a featureless spectrum lacking absorption bands from materials such as ices. The reddish color and featureless spectrum of 2002 KX_{14} indicates that its surface is probably covered with complex organic compounds (tholins) or silicates. The red coloration of other TNOs is typically attributed to tholins on their surface, which are formed by the irradiation of ices and simple organic compounds by solar and cosmic radiation. A 2021 study led by Fernández-Valenzuela et al. suggested that the composition of 2002 KX_{14}'s surface is 20%±10% water, 60%±10% silicates, and 20%±10% organics.

== Possible satellite ==
2002 KX_{14} is not known to have natural satellites or moons, although there is indirect evidence for one orbiting close to it. A 2026 study led by José Gómez-Limón found that 2002 KX_{14} emits more thermal radiation than expected for its size, which appears to be best explained if it had a thermally-emitting moon. Based on the difference between 2002 KX_{14}'s measured and predicted thermal emission, the diameter of its possible moon is inferred to be 251+65
−57 km (156+40
−35 mi)—about two-thirds the diameter of 2002 KX_{14}. Such a large moon would make 2002 KX_{14} a binary system, whose origin likely comes from either streaming instability or an impact.

Hubble Space Telescope images from 2006 showed no moon around 2002 KX_{14}, which suggests it orbits too closely to be resolved. Stellar occultation observations from 2020 to 2023 also found no moon around 2002 KX_{14}. However, these occultation observations only searched a small region of space surrounding 2002 KX_{14}, so it is likely that they missed the putative moon of 2002 KX_{14}.

== See also ==
- (556416) 2014 OE394, one of the largest cold classical Kuiper belt objects
- (84522) 2002 TC302, a similarly-sized trans-Neptunian object whose shape has been characterized by stellar occultations
- (84922) 2003 VS2, another similarly-sized trans-Neptunian object whose shape has been characterized by stellar occultations
- (612533) 2002 XV93, a similarly-sized trans-Neptunian object discovered to have an atmosphere in stellar occultation observations
