= (469987) 2006 HJ123 =

Trans-Neptunian object (TNO)

(469987) 2006 HJ_{123}
Discovery
- Discovered by: Marc W. Buie
- Discovery date: 27 April 2006

Designations
- Minor planet category: TNO (plutino)

Orbital characteristics
- Epoch 13 January 2016 (JD 2457400.5)
- Uncertainty parameter 3
- Observation arc: 1838 days (5.03 yr)
- Aphelion: 51.444 AU (7.6959 Tm)
- Perihelion: 27.626 AU (4.1328 Tm)
- Semi-major axis: 39.535 AU (5.9144 Tm)
- Eccentricity: 0.30123
- Orbital period (sidereal): 248.59 yr (90798.1 d)
- Mean anomaly: 309.05°
- Mean motion: 0° 0^{m} 14.273^{s} /day
- Inclination: 12.433°
- Longitude of ascending node: 222.53°
- Time of perihelion: ≈ 26 April 2051 ±1 days
- Argument of perihelion: 101.59°
- Earth MOID: 26.636 AU (3.9847 Tm)
- Jupiter MOID: 22.7401 AU (3.40187 Tm)

Physical characteristics
- Dimensions: 283.1^{+142.3}_{−110.8} km
- Geometric albedo: 0.136^{+0.308}_{−0.089}
- Temperature: ~44 K
- Absolute magnitude (H): 5.32 ± 0.66,

(469987) 2006 HJ_{123} is a trans-Neptunian object (TNO). It was discovered in 2006 by Marc W. Buie. The object is a plutino (in 2:3 resonance with Neptune).

The size of 2006 HJ_{123} was measured by the Herschel Space Telescope to be 283^{+142}_{−111} km.
