= (469372) 2001 QF298 =

Trans-Neptunian object

(469372) 2001 QF_{298}
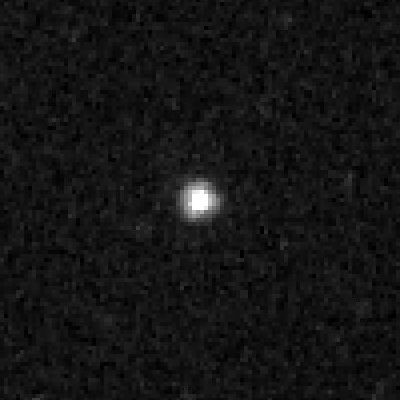
- 2001 QF_{298} imaged by the Hubble Space Telescope in 2006.

Discovery
- Discovered by: Marc W. Buie; Cerro Tololo (807)
- Discovery date: August 19, 2001

Designations
- Minor planet category: TNO · plutino

Orbital characteristics
- Epoch 13 January 2016 (JD 2457400.5)
- Uncertainty parameter 3
- Observation arc: 4526 days (12.39 yr)
- Aphelion: 43.726 AU (6.5413 Tm)
- Perihelion: 34.756 AU (5.1994 Tm)
- Semi-major axis: 39.241 AU (5.8704 Tm)
- Eccentricity: 0.11429
- Orbital period (sidereal): 245.82 yr (89784.4 d)
- Average orbital speed: 4.73 km/s
- Mean anomaly: 154.29°
- Mean motion: 0° 0^{m} 14.435^{s} /day
- Inclination: 22.408°
- Longitude of ascending node: 164.24°
- Argument of perihelion: 41.215°
- Known satellites: 0

Physical characteristics
- Dimensions: 408.2^{+40.2}_{−44.9} km
- Geometric albedo: 0.071^{+0.020}_{−0.014}
- Spectral type: B−V=0.67 ± 0.07; V−R=0.39 ± 0.06
- Absolute magnitude (H): 5.43 ± 0.07

(469372) 2001 QF_{298} is a resonant trans-Neptunian object that resides in the Kuiper belt in the outermost region of the Solar System. It was discovered on August 19, 2001 by Marc W. Buie. 2001 QF_{298} is a plutino, meaning that it is locked in a 3:2 orbital resonance with Neptune, much like Pluto.

== Physical characteristics ==
In 2012, the size of 2001 QF_{298} was estimated based on thermal radiation data obtained with the Herschel Space Telescope. The result was 408.2^{+40.2}_{−44.9} km.

In the visible light, the object appears to have a neutral or slightly red color.

== Dwarf planet candidate ==
When first discovered, 2001 QF_{298} was calculated to have an absolute magnitude (H) of 4.7. Light-curve-amplitude analysis from 2008 showed only small deviations, which suggested that 2001 QF_{298} could be a spheroid about 480 kilometres (300 mi) in diameter with small albedo spots and hence a dwarf planet. It is not included in the same authors' list of dwarf-planet candidates from 2010 because having an absolute magnitude of 5.4 and assumed albedo of 0.1, it would be less than the cut-off size of 450 kilometres (280 mi) (the same criteria as in the first paper).
