= (307463) 2002 VU130 =

Trans-Neptunian object (TNO)

(307463) 2002 VU_{130}
Discovery
- Discovered by: M. W. Buie
- Discovery site: Kitt Peak Obs.
- Discovery date: 7 November 2002

Designations
- Minor planet category: TNO · plutino

Orbital characteristics
- Epoch 1 July 2021 (JD 2459396.5)
- Uncertainty parameter 2 · 1
- Observation arc: 13.99 yr (5,110 d)
- Aphelion: 47.106 AU
- Perihelion: 30.929 AU
- Semi-major axis: 39.018 AU
- Eccentricity: 0.2073
- Orbital period (sidereal): 243.73 yr (89,021 d)
- Mean anomaly: 278.86°
- Mean motion: 0° 0^{m} 14.4^{s} / day
- Inclination: 1.3761°
- Longitude of ascending node: 267.86°
- Argument of perihelion: 281.56°
- Known satellites: 0

Physical characteristics
- Mean diameter: 253 km
- Geometric albedo: 0.179
- Absolute magnitude (H): 5.47

(307463) 2002 VU_{130} is a trans-Neptunian object, located in the circumstellar disc of the Kuiper belt in the outermost region of the Solar System. The resonant trans-Neptunian object belongs to the population of plutinos and measures approximately 253 kilometers (160 miles) in diameter. It was discovered on 7 November 2002, by American astronomer Marc Buie at the Kitt Peak Observatory near Tucson, Arizona.

== Orbit and classification ==
2002 VU_{130} is a plutino, a population of objects in the Kuiper belt that stay in a 2:3 resonance with Neptune. A large part of the inner Kuiper belt is formed by objects belonging to this population which is named after its largest member, Pluto. 2002 VU_{130} orbits the Sun at a distance of 30.9–47.1 AU once every 243 years and 9 months (89,021 days; semi-major axis of 39.02 AU). Its orbit has an eccentricity of 0.21 and an inclination of 1° with respect to the ecliptic. The body's observation arc begins with its official discovery observation on 7 November 2002. It is currently approaching the Sun at 39.428 AU, with its perihelion-passage projected to occur in June 2076.

== Numbering and naming ==
This minor planet was numbered by the Minor Planet Center on 10 December 2011 (M.P.C. 77418). As of 2025, it has not been named. If named, it will follow the already established scheme of naming these objects after mythological entities associated with the underworld.

== Physical characteristics ==
=== Diameter and albedo ===
Observations with Herschel's PACS instrument were published in 2011. For 2002 VU_{130}, the measurements gave a mean-diameter of 252.9+33.6
−31.3 km with an unusually high albedo of 0.179+0.202
−0.103 and an absolute magnitude of 5.47±0.83. This result has been adopted in Johnston's Archive, giving a rounded diameter of 253 kilometers (160 miles), while Mike Brown estimates a similar one of 260 km with an albedo of 0.18 and an absolute magnitude of 5.5.
