= Plutino =

Dynamical group of trans-Neptunian objects

In astronomy, the plutinos are a dynamical group of trans-Neptunian objects that orbit in 2:3 mean-motion resonance with Neptune. This means that for every two orbits a plutino makes, Neptune orbits three times. The dwarf planet Pluto is the largest member as well as the namesake of this group. The next largest members are Orcus, Achlys, and Ixion. Plutinos are named after mythological creatures associated with the underworld.

Plutinos form the inner part of the Kuiper belt and represent about a quarter of the known Kuiper belt objects. They are also the most populous known class of resonant trans-Neptunian objects (also see adjunct box with hierarchical listing). The first plutino after Pluto itself, (385185) 1993 RO, was discovered on 16 September 1993.

== Orbits ==
Some of the largest known plutinos compared in size, albedo and colour

=== Origin ===
It is thought that the objects that are currently in mean orbital resonances with Neptune initially followed a variety of independent heliocentric paths. As Neptune migrated outward early in the Solar System's history (see origins of the Kuiper belt), the bodies it approached would have been scattered; during this process, some of them would have been captured into resonances. The 3:2 resonance is a low-order resonance and is thus the strongest and most stable among all resonances. This is the primary reason it has a larger population than the other Neptunian resonances encountered in the Kuiper belt. The cloud of low-inclination bodies beyond 40 AU is the cubewano family, while bodies with higher eccentricities (0.05 to 0.34) and semi-major axes close to the 3:2 Neptune resonance are primarily plutinos.

=== Orbital characteristics ===
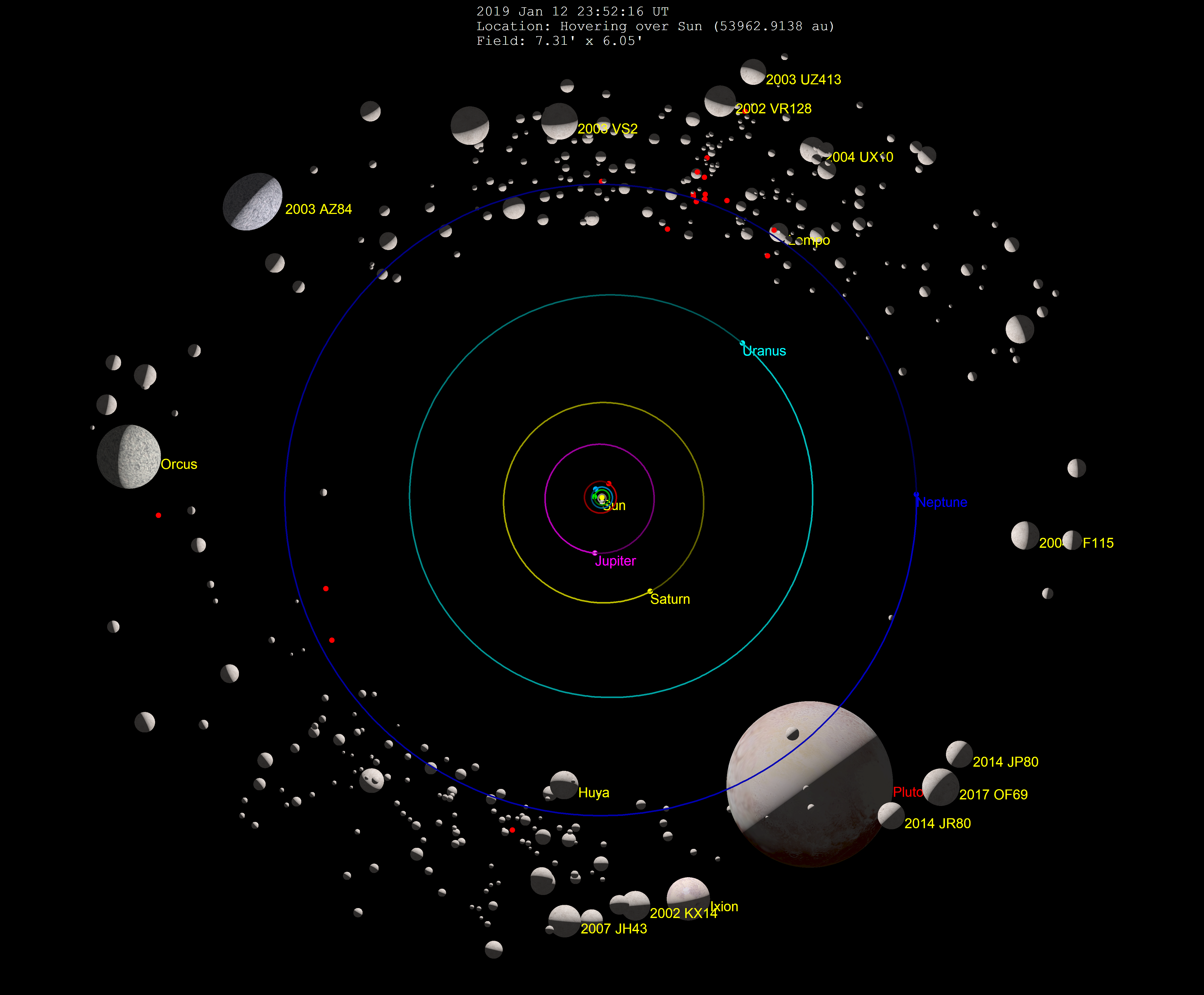
The distribution of plutinos, and relative sizes, drawn 1 million times larger.

While the majority of plutinos have relatively low orbital inclinations, a significant fraction of these objects follow orbits similar to that of Pluto, with inclinations in the 10–25° range and eccentricities around 0.2–0.25; such orbits result in many of these objects having perihelia close to or even inside Neptune's orbit, while simultaneously having aphelia that bring them close to the main Kuiper belt's outer edge (where objects in a 1:2 resonance with Neptune, the twotinos, are found).

The orbital periods of plutinos cluster around 247.3 years (1.5 × Neptune's orbital period), varying by at most a few years from this value.

Unusual plutinos include:

- 2005 TV_{189}, which follows the most highly inclined orbit (34.5°)
- (15875) 1996 TP66, which has the most elliptical orbit (its eccentricity is 0.33), with the perihelion halfway between Uranus and Neptune
- (470308) 2007 JH43 following a quasi-circular orbit
- 2002 VX_{130} lying almost perfectly on the ecliptic (inclination less than 1.5°)
- 15810 Arawn, a quasi-satellite of Pluto
- (612533) 2002 XV93, which has an extremely thin atmosphere announced in 2026
- (552679) 2010 JH210 has a Neptune MOID of 0.00034 AU (51 thousand km), but it can not get that close to Neptune because the 3:2 resonance with Neptune controls the orbit.

See also the comparison with the distribution of the cubewanos.

=== Long-term stability ===
Pluto's influence on the other plutinos has historically been neglected due to its relatively small mass. However, the resonance width (the range of semi-axes compatible with the resonance) is very narrow and only a few times larger than Pluto's Hill sphere (gravitational influence). Consequently, depending on the original eccentricity, some plutinos will eventually be driven out of the resonance by interactions with Pluto. Numerical simulations suggest that the orbits of plutinos with an eccentricity 10%–30% smaller or larger than that of Pluto are not stable over billion-year timescales.

== Orbital diagrams ==
The motions of Orcus and Pluto in a rotating frame with a period equal to Neptune's orbital period (holding Neptune stationary). Pluto is grey, Orcus is red, and Neptune is the white (stationary) dot at 5 o'clock. Uranus is blue, Saturn yellow, and Jupiter red.

Orbits and sizes of the larger plutinos (and the reference non-plutino 2002 KX_{14}). Orbital eccentricity is represented by segments extending horizontally from perihelion to aphelion; inclination is shown on the vertical axis.

The distribution of plutinos (and the reference non-plutino 2002 KX_{14}). Small inserts show histograms for the distributions of orbital inclination and eccentricity.

== Brightest objects ==
The plutinos brighter than H_{V}=6 include:

Object	a (AU)	q (AU)	i (°)	H	Diameter (km)	Albedo	V−R	Discovery year	Discoverer	Refs
134340 Pluto	39.3	29.7	17.1	−0.7	2376.6	0.49–0.66		1930	Clyde Tombaugh	JPL
90482 Orcus	39.2	30.3	20.6	2.31±0.03	917±25	0.28±0.06	0.37	2004	M. Brown, C. Trujillo, D. Rabinowitz	JPL
208996 Achlys	39.4	32.3	13.6	3.760±0.058	772±12	0.097±0.009	0.38±0.04	2003	M. Brown, C. Trujillo	JPL
28978 Ixion	39.7	30.1	19.6	3.845±0.006	696.78+10.75 −8.87	0.106±0.003	0.61	2001	Deep Ecliptic Survey	JPL
(455502) 2003 UZ413	39.2	30.4	12.0	4.38±0.05	≈ 600	?	0.46±0.06	2001	M. Brown, C. Trujillo, D. Rabinowitz	JPL
(678191) 2017 OF69	39.5	31.3	13.6	4.6	≈ 380–680	?	?	2017	D. J. Tholen, S. S. Sheppard, C. Trujillo	JPL
(84922) 2003 VS2	39.3	36.4	14.8	4.14±0.07	524±7	0.134±0.010	0.59±0.02	2003	NEAT	JPL
(612533) 2002 XV93	39.3	34.5	13.3	4.73	470+44 −30	0.040+0.020 −0.015	0.37±0.02	2001	M.W.Buie	JPL
(578993) 2014 JP80	39.5	36.7	19.4	4.9	≈ 240–670	?	?	2014	Pan-STARRS	JPL
(84719) 2002 VR128	39.3	28.9	14.0	5.58±0.37	448.5+42.1 −43.2	0.052+0.027 −0.018	0.60±0.02	2002	NEAT	JPL
(556068) 2014 JR80	39.5	36.0	15.4	4.9	≈ 240–670	?	?	2014	Pan-STARRS	JPL
38628 Huya	39.4	28.5	15.5	5.04±0.03	414.7±0.9	0.079±0.004	0.57±0.09	2000	Ignacio Ferrin	JPL
(469372) 2001 QF298	39.3	34.9	22.4	5.43±0.07	408.2+40.2 −44.9	0.071+0.020 −0.014	0.39±0.06	2001	Marc W. Buie	JPL
47171 Lempo	39.3	30.6	8.4	5.41±0.10	393.1+25.2 −26.8 (combined diameter of triple system)	0.079+0.013 −0.011	0.70±0.03	1999	E. P. Rubenstein, L.-G. Strolger	JPL
(469987) 2006 HJ123	39.3	27.4	12.0	5.32±0.66	283.1+142.3 −110.8	0.136+0.308 −0.089		2006	Marc W. Buie	JPL
(307463) 2002 VU130	39.3	31.2	14.0	5.47±0.83	252.9+33.6 −31.3	0.179+0.202 −0.103		2002	Marc W. Buie	JPL
(55638) 2002 VE95	39.4	30.4	16.3	5.70±0.06	249.8+13.5 −13.1	0.149+0.019 −0.016	0.72±0.05	2002	NEAT	JPL

(link to all of the orbits of these objects listed above are here)

== See also ==
- Resonant trans-Neptunian object
- Twotino
