= 208996 Achlys =

Large plutino

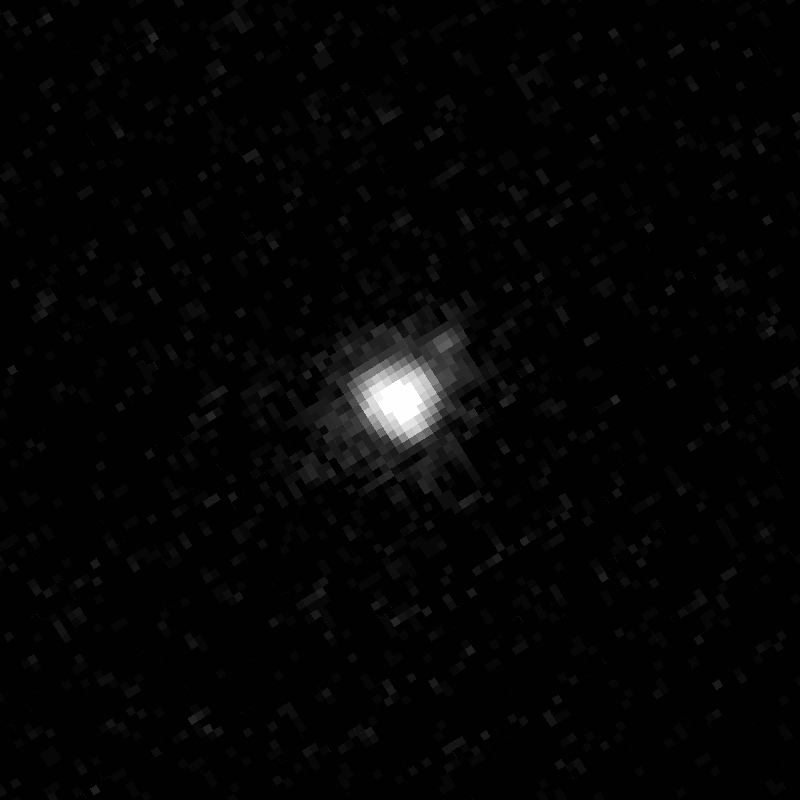
- Achlys and its moon (upper right) imaged by the Hubble Space Telescope in December 2005

Discovery
- Discovered by: Chad Trujillo; Michael E. Brown
- Discovery site: Palomar Obs.
- Discovery date: 13 January 2003

Designations
- Pronunciation: /ˈækləs/
- Named after: Achlys (Ἀχλύς)
- Alternative designations: 2003 AZ_{84}
- Minor planet category: TNO · plutino · distant
- Adjectives: Achlyan

Orbital characteristics (barycentric) (Note: These orbital elements are expressed in terms of the Solar System Barycenter (SSB) as the frame of reference. Due to planetary perturbations, the Sun revolves around the SSB at non-negligible distances, so heliocentric-frame orbital elements and distances (such as those given in JPL's Small-Body Database) can vary on short timescales.)
- Epoch 21 November 2025 (JD 2461000.5)
- Uncertainty parameter 1
- Observation arc: 29+ yr
- Earliest precovery date: 19 March 1996
- Aphelion: 46.536 AU
- Perihelion: 32.403 AU
- Semi-major axis: 39.470 AU
- Eccentricity: 0.1790
- Orbital period (sidereal): 247.81 yr (90,511 d)
- Mean anomaly: 242.166°
- Mean motion: 0° 0^{m} 14.319^{s} / day
- Inclination: 13.565°
- Longitude of ascending node: 252.029°
- Time of perihelion: ≈ 27 March 2107 ±0.14 days
- Argument of perihelion: 15.117°
- Known satellites: 1

Physical characteristics
- Dimensions: (940±40) × (766±20) × (490±16) km (Note: Derived from the assumption of hydrostatic equilibrium.)
- Mean diameter: 772±12 km (area equivalent)
- Mass: ≈ 2×10^{20} kg (Note: The mass of 2.08×10^{20} kg was calculated by Muñoz-Gutiérrez et al. (2019 & 2021) using Achlys's area-equivalent diameter of 772 km and predicted density of 0.87 g/cm^{3}. Muñoz-Gutiérrez et al. give the mass in terms of Earth masses (M_{🜨}), which can be converted into kilograms by multiplying by 5.9722×10^{24} kg/M_{🜨}. This calculation does not treat Achlys as an ellipsoid (which would have a volume of $V = \frac{4}{3} \pi a b c \approx 1.85 \times 10^{17} \text{ m}^{3}$), though the mass calculated from Achlys's ellipsoid volume and density ($M = \rho V \approx 1.61 \times 10^{20} \text{ kg}$) is equivalent to Muñoz-Gutiérrez et al.'s mass calculation when rounded to a single digit.)
- Mean density: 0.87±0.01 g/cm^{3}
- Synodic rotation period: 6.7874±0.0002 h
- Geometric albedo: 0.097±0.009
- Spectral type: Prominent water (H_{2}O-type); BB (neutral); B−V = 0.70±0.03; V−R = 0.36±0.03
- Apparent magnitude: 20.3
- Absolute magnitude (H): 3.760±0.058 (V band)

208996 Achlys (provisional designation 2003 AZ_{84}) is a large trans-Neptunian object orbiting the Sun in the Kuiper belt, a region of icy bodies beyond Neptune. It was discovered on 13 January 2003 by Chad Trujillo and Michael E. Brown at Palomar Observatory. Achlys has an elongated shape that is believed to be distorted by its rapid 6.8-hour rotation. Its diameter is estimated to be roughly 940 km (580 mi) across its equator to 490 km (300 mi) across its poles. After Pluto and Orcus, Achlys is the third largest member of the plutinos—a population of Kuiper belt objects following a 2:3 orbital resonance with Neptune, in which they complete two orbits for every three orbits completed by Neptune.

The surface of Achlys is dark gray and mostly composed of water ice. Observations of stellar occultations show that Achlys's surface bears a chasm or depression between 8 and 13 km (5.0 and 8.1 mi) deep, similar to those seen on Pluto and its moon Charon. Achlys has one known moon that is about 80 km (50 mi) in diameter. The mass and density of Achlys has not been measured, though predictions based on its shape and rotation suggest that it has a density lower than that of water ice.

== History ==
=== Discovery ===
Achlys was discovered on 13 January 2003 by astronomers Chad Trujillo and Michael Brown (Note: This is the official order of discoverers according to the Minor Planet Center.) at Palomar Observatory in San Diego County, California. At the time, Trujillo and Brown were searching the sky for bright and large trans-Neptunian objects—Solar System objects beyond Neptune—using the Palomar Observatory's 1.22-meter (48 in) Samuel Oschin telescope, as part of their "Caltech Wide Area Sky Survey" project. Their sky survey had been operating jointly with Palomar's Near Earth Asteroid Tracking (NEAT) program since 2001 and was responsible for the discovery of several other large trans-Neptunian objects including Quaoar.

Achlys was found through manual vetting of potential moving objects identified by Trujillo and Brown's automated image-searching software. It was detected at a red-filter apparent magnitude of 20.2. The discovery of Achlys was announced by Minor Planet Center (MPC) on 26 January 2003. Since then, numerous precovery observations of Achlys were identified from Palomar Observatory, with observations from 2001–2002 reported in April 2003 and a single observation from 19 March 1996 reported in December 2007. This 1996 observation is the earliest known precovery of Achlys, predating its discovery by over six years.

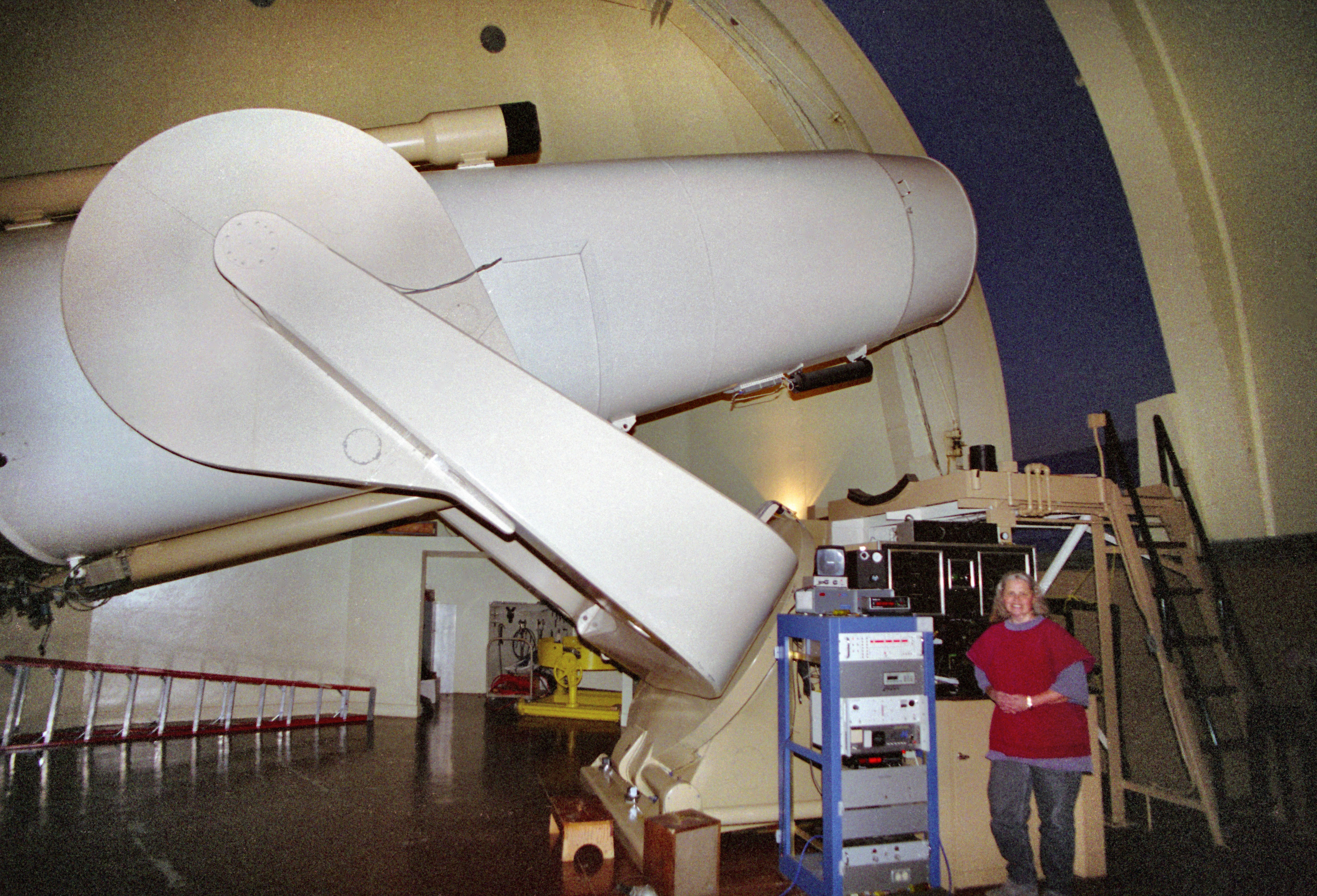
The 1.2-meter Samuel Oschin telescope that was used to discover Achlys at Palomar Observatory

Discovery images of Achlys from 13 January 2003

=== Name ===
This object is named after Achlys, the goddess of sorrow and grief in the ancient Greek epic poem Shield of Heracles. In Homer's Iliad, "achlys" also refers to the mist that covers the eyes of the dying. This name follows the theme of mythological figures related to the underworld, which is required for plutinos by the International Astronomical Union (IAU). The object was officially named Achlys on 30 June 2025 by the IAU's Working Group for Small Body Nomenclature.

Before Achlys was named, it was known by its provisional designation 2003 AZ_{84}, which was given by the MPC in its discovery announcement. This provisional designation encodes the year and half-month of Achlys's discovery date. Achlys's minor planet catalog number of 208996 was given by the MPC on 11 March 2009.

=== Occultations ===
While moving across the sky, Achlys occasionally passes in front of a background star and briefly blocks out its light from Earth, resulting in a stellar occultation. When observed at different locations, stellar occultations by Achlys can reveal fine details that are unresolvable to telescope imaging, such as its size, shape, and potential surrounding features such as rings and moons. The first successful detection of a stellar occultation by Achlys was reported by a single observer from Chile on 8 January 2011. Later observations of stellar occultations on 3 February 2012 and 15 November 2014 were successfully detected by multiple observers at different locations, which revealed the elongated shape and topography of Achlys for the first time. No rings and moons were detected around Achlys in these observations.

== Orbit ==
Achlys orbits the Sun at a semi-major axis or average distance of 39.5 astronomical units (AU), which places it beyond the orbit of Neptune (30.1 AU) and in the inner reaches of the Kuiper belt, where many other small objects reside. The location of Achlys's orbit makes it a trans-Neptunian object (TNO) and a Kuiper belt object. Achlys completes one orbit about every 247 years, which puts it in a 2:3 mean-motion orbital resonance with Neptune. That is, Achlys completes two orbits around the Sun for every three orbits completed by Neptune. Many other Kuiper belt objects, including the dwarf planet Pluto, share Achlys's 2:3 resonance with Neptune—these objects are classified as plutinos. Achlys is the third largest plutino, after Pluto and Orcus.

The orbit of Achlys is elliptical and inclined with respect to the ecliptic by 13.6°. Unlike some plutinos including Pluto, (Note: Pluto has a perihelion distance of 29.6 AU, which lies inside the orbit of Neptune (30.1 AU).) Achlys does not cross Neptune's orbit: its elliptical orbit brings it as close as 32.4 AU from the Sun (at perihelion) to as far as 46.5 AU from the Sun (at aphelion). Achlys previously passed aphelion in June 1982 and will come to perihelion in March 2107. Even though Achlys's orbit is perturbed by the gravitational influence of other planets, the perihelion of Achlys's orbit is not expected to drop below 31.6 AU in the next 10 million years, according to N-body simulations by the Deep Ecliptic Survey. Achlys's orbit is stable over several billion years and is unlikely to change significantly over the remaining life of the Solar System.

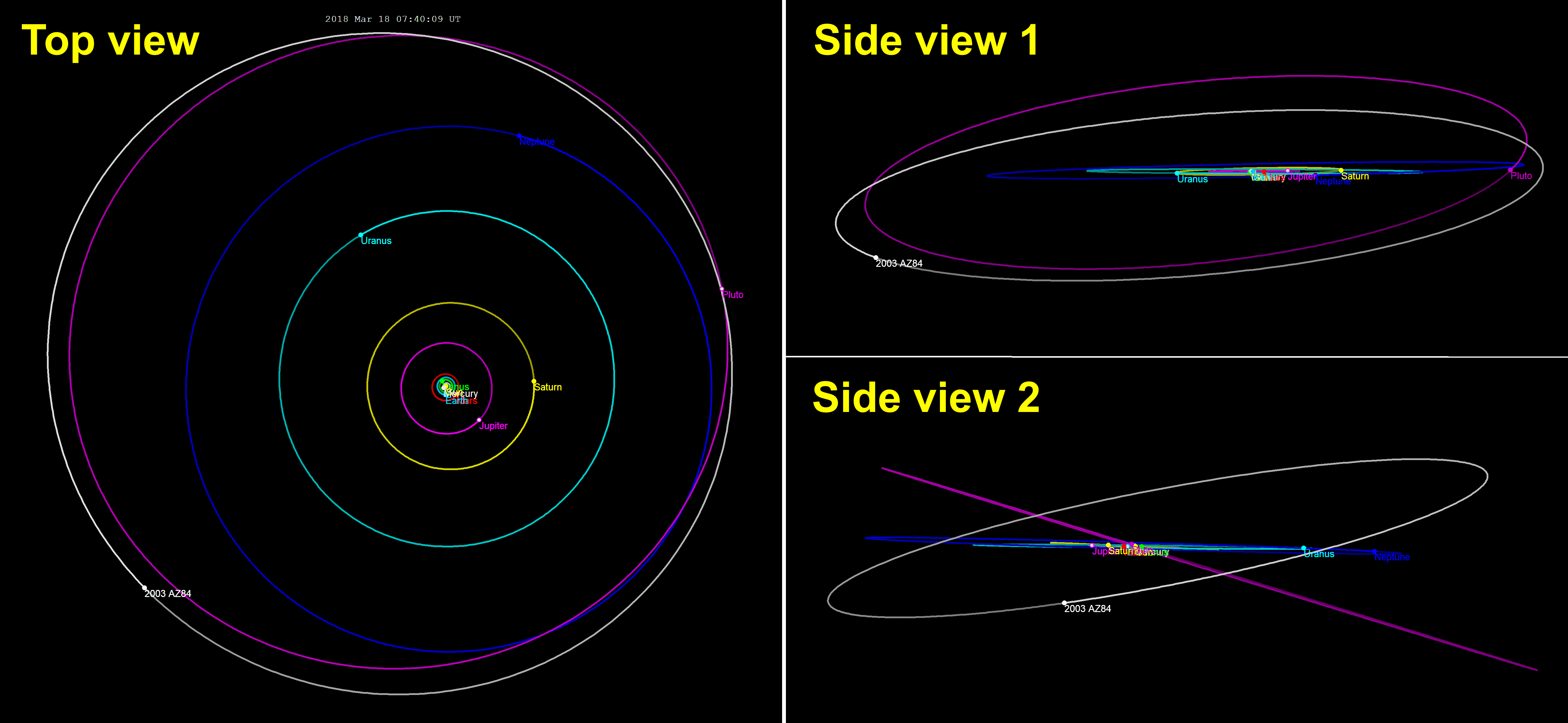
The orbits of Achlys (white; shown as 2003 AZ_{84}), Pluto (magenta), and the four outer planets. The positions of objects are shown on the date 18 March 2018.

== Physical characteristics ==
=== Size, shape, density ===
Comparison of sizes, albedos, and colors of various large trans-Neptunian objects with diameters greater than 700 km (430 mi). Achlys is shown on the right end of the bottom row. The light and dark colored arcs represent uncertainties of the object's size.

Observations of stellar occultations from 2012 and 2014 show that Achlys is an elongated object. Under the assumption that Achlys is in hydrostatic equilibrium (that is, its shape is controlled by its own gravity and rotation), its shape can be approximated by a rotationally distorted Jacobi ellipsoid with dimensions of 940 km × 766 km × 490 km (584 mi × 476 mi × 304 mi). With these dimensions, the equatorial diameter of Achlys is roughly twice as long as its polar diameter. This rotationally distorted shape has been seen in other large Kuiper belt objects, like Haumea and Varuna. The approximated dimensions of Achlys translate to an area-equivalent diameter of 772 km (480 mi), which is large enough that astronomers consider Achlys likely in hydrostatic equilibrium (Note: The minimum diameter for hydrostatic equilibrium depends on the object's bulk composition: a rocky body would have to be larger than 500 to 1,200 km (310 to 750 mi), whereas an icy body would have to be larger than 200 to 900 km (120 to 560 mi).) and therefore a possible dwarf planet. Achlys is among the top 30 largest known TNOs.

The mass and density of Achlys have not been measured, though the assumption of hydrostatic equilibrium with its ellipsoidal shape predicts that it should have a density in the range of 0.85–1.12 g/cm^{3}, with the most likely value being 0.87 g/cm^{3}. This density indicates Achlys has a mass of around 2×10^{20} kg. Achlys falls within the 400–1,000 km (250–620 mi) diameter range where TNOs are typically observed with densities lower than that of water ice (1 g/cm^{3}); these objects are theorized to have porous interior structures due to a lack of internal melting, differentiation, and gravitational compression. Achlys's small size also makes it unlikely to hold much internal heat or possess cryovolcanism.

=== Rotation ===
Animated illustration of Achlys as a rotating ellipsoid, with its rotation axis pointed nearly toward the line of sight.

Achlys has a rotation period of about 6.79 hours. The apparent brightness of Achlys periodically fluctuates with a small peak-to-peak amplitude of 0.07 magnitudes as it rotates, which could be monitored by telescopes on Earth. The rotation period of Achlys was first measured by Scott Sheppard and David C. Jewitt in 2003, who found a rotation period of either 6.7 and 13.4 hours. The rotation period of Achlys remained ambiguous until 2017, when it was found to have an elongated shape that was best explained by the former period.

Achlys has a highly tilted rotation axis that is pointed somewhat toward Earth, according to observations of Achlys's small rotational brightness variation, constant thermal emission, and variable projected shape in stellar occultations. A 2017 analysis of stellar occultation observations from 2012 and 2014 suggested that Achlys's rotational pole could be oriented at an opening angle of roughly 50° with respect to the plane of the sky and at a position angle of 78° eastward from the celestial north pole.

=== Surface ===
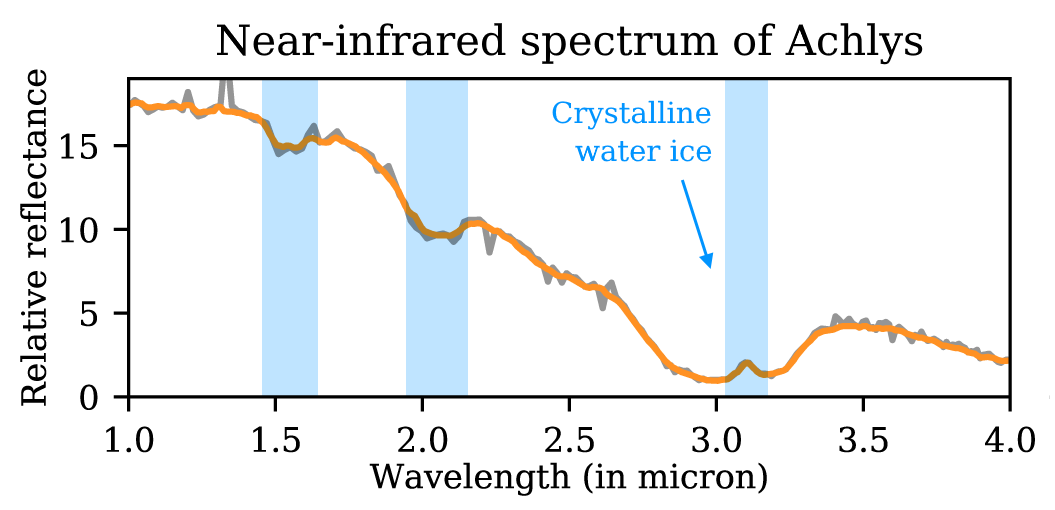
The near-infrared spectrum of Achlys as measured by the James Webb Space Telescope. The spectrum of Achlys shows absorption features caused by crystalline water ice on its surface.

Infographic illustrating the two possible shapes of Achlys's topographic feature seen from its 15 November 2014 stellar occultation

Achlys is a dark, icy object with a likely ancient surface devoid of geological activity. Its surface is dominated by water ice and has a low, average geometric albedo of about 10%. Astronomical spectroscopy has shown that both amorphous and crystalline forms of water ice are present on Achlys's surface, which make it highly absorbent in near-infrared wavelengths of light. Crystalline water ice is not commonly found on the surfaces of TNOs due to their cold temperatures, so its presence on Achlys suggests that the object had experienced heating, possibly by an impact event.

Spectroscopic analyses from 2010 and 2011 suggest that Achlys's surface may be darkened by amorphous carbon, which is thought to originate from heavily irradiated organic compounds. These analyses also suggest that water ice and amorphous carbon each comprise major portions of Achlys's surface, with amorphous water ice likely more abundant than crystalline water ice. The surface of Achlys is devoid of volatile ices like nitrogen and carbon monoxide, in contrast to the largest trans-Neptunian objects like Pluto. This is expected because Achlys's gravity is too weak to hold on any atmosphere, especially volatiles after they have sublimated into vapor.

In visible light, Achlys's surface is spectrally neutral with respect to the Sun, (Note: A "spectrally neutral" object reflects similar amounts of light over a range of wavelengths (e.g. the visible spectrum).) which gives it a gray color. Achlys shares its gray color and water ice-rich surface with several TNOs including the large plutino Orcus; these objects are classified as BB ("blue")-type TNOs in terms of visible color and "prominent water" (H_{2}O)-type TNOs in terms of spectra. The gray color of Achlys implies that it contains little amounts of tholins—moderately irradiated organic compounds that would otherwise tint the surface red. Spectroscopic analyses suggest that tholins should make up roughly 10% of Achlys's surface composition.

The surface of Achlys is not uniform. The albedo is suspected to vary across Achlys's surface because the object varies in brightness as it rotates. Near-infrared spectroscopy of Achlys shows variable spectral absorption of water ice and tentative signs of methanol ice. Visible-light spectroscopy has detected sporadic hints of hydrated minerals such as silicates, which are suspected to exist in localized deposits on Achlys's surface. The color of Achlys has been observed to change as it rotates, with its visible spectral slope or redness varying between 3.5%/0.1 μm and 8.5%/0.1 μm. This color variation may hint at localized areas of concentrated tholins on Achlys's surface, which could be explained by various phenomena such as an impact crater left by a red TNO.

In November 2014, an observation of a stellar occultation from Yunnan, China revealed that Achlys has a topographic feature located at its limb—the edge of its projected shape. The observation showed a gradual dimming of the occulted star, which has been interpreted as a partial, grazing occultation by Achlys's topographic feature. Achlys is the first TNO whose topographic feature has been observed via stellar occultation. The topographic feature on Achlys could either be a chasm at least 7.7 km (4.8 mi) deep and roughly 22.6 km (14.0 mi) wide, or a shallow-sloped depression roughly 13.4 km (8.3 mi) deep and at least 80 km (50 mi) wide. Such features have been seen on Pluto and its moon Charon.

== Satellite ==
Moon of 208996 Achlys
Discovery
- Discovered by: Michael E. Brown; Terry-Ann Suer
- Discovery date: 2 December 2005

Orbital characteristics
- Semi-major axis: 7200±300 km or ~10000 km
- Orbital period (sidereal): ~12 days (Note: Wm. Robert Johnston calculates the moon's orbital period with the assumption that its observed separation distance of 7200 km is equal to its semi-major axis from Achlys (which has a calculated mass of 2×10^{20} kg).)
- Satellite of: 208996 Achlys

Physical characteristics
- Mean diameter: 77+10 −11 km (same albedo as Achlys)
- Mass: few 10^{17} kg (Note: Moon mass estimated by Dias-Oliveira et al. (2017) with the assumption of an icy composition.)
- Apparent magnitude: 25.1
- Absolute magnitude (H): 8.76 (Note: The sum of Achlys's V-band absolute magnitude of 3.76 and its moon's magnitude difference of 5.0 is 8.76.)

Achlys has one known natural satellite or moon, which has no official name or designation. It was discovered by Michael E. Brown and Terry-Ann Suer in images taken by the Hubble Space Telescope on 2 December 2005. The discovery of Achlys's moon was announced on 22 February 2007 via an International Astronomical Union Circular published by the Central Bureau for Astronomical Telegrams.

The moon of Achlys has not been seen since its discovery. The lack of redetections means that the orbit of Achlys's moon could not be determined, which prevents an accurate determination of Achlys's mass. Nevertheless, some properties of the moon's orbit have been predicted based on its observed separation distance from Achlys at discovery.

In the discovery images, the moon was seen at an angular separation of 0.22±0.01 arcseconds from Achlys, which translates to an apparent distance of at least 7,200 ± 300 km (4,470 ± 190 mi). If this separation distance is the moon's semi-major axis from Achlys, then it would have an orbital period of approximately 12 days. The moon is predicted to have a non-circular orbit due to weak tidal circularization by Achlys. The moon is 5.0±0.3 magnitudes fainter than Achlys, which translates to a diameter of roughly 80 km (50 mi) if it has the same albedo as Achlys. If the moon has an icy composition, its mass would be a few times 10^{17} kg. Compared to other TNOs with moons, the moon of Achlys is quite small; this suggests that Achlys's moon formed from a collision with another body.

A 2026 study led by José Gómez-Limón found that Achlys emits more thermal radiation than expected for its size, which could be explained if there is additional thermal radiation coming from its moon. However, to explain Achlys's excess thermal emission, its moon would have to be much larger with a diameter of 236+64
−52 km (147+40
−32 mi). If this large diameter estimate is accurate, then it would imply the moon has significantly different surface properties (such as albedo) from Achlys. On the other hand, if Achlys's moon is much smaller, then the excess thermal emission can be explained if Achlys has either a larger diameter or a second moon.

== Proposed exploration ==
Achlys has not been visited by a space probe, though various studies have found it to be a feasible target for future missions. Planetary scientists advocate for the exploration of large TNOs like Achlys because they can provide insights into the formation and evolution of the Solar System.

A 2019 study by Amanda Zangari and collaborators identified several possible flyby trajectories to Achlys, using different excess launch energies and gravity assists from planets. A spacecraft launched in 2035–2038 could use a single Jupiter gravity assist to reach Achlys in 8.2–11.6 years. Alternatively, a spacecraft launched in 2025–2034 could use a single Saturn gravity assist to reach Achlys in 9.2–18.2 years. A 2037–2038 launch trajectory using gravity assists from both Jupiter and Saturn would be less efficient however, as it would demand higher launch energies with long mission durations of 23.8–23.9 years.

Flyby missions to Achlys using gravity assists from Uranus are also possible. A 2021 study by Bryan Holler and colleagues for the 2023–2032 Planetary Science Decadal Survey identified Achlys as a potential target for a flyby mission to Uranus, which could launch in the 2030s, reach Uranus in 2045, and then reach Achlys in 2049. Zangari and collaborators found that a spacecraft launched in 2034–2038 could reach Achlys in 13.1–13.2 years via gravity assists from both Jupiter and Uranus, whereas a spacecraft launched in 2027–2033 could reach Achlys in 17.7 years via gravity assists from both Jupiter and Uranus.

A 2013 study by the University of Tennessee investigated the possibility of sending a small (100–380 kg) orbiter spacecraft to a TNO and found that Achlys could be a feasible option. An orbiter launched in July 2035 or 2047 could make use of a Jupiter gravity assist to reach Achlys in 10–25 years depending on the excess launch energy, though lower launch energies and longer mission durations are required to make it possible for orbit insertion around Achlys.

== See also ==
- 28978 Ixion – the fourth largest known plutino, after Pluto, Orcus, and Achlys
- 120347 Salacia – a large Kuiper belt object with a dark, gray surface rich in water ice, similar to Achlys
- 307261 Máni – another large, gray-colored Kuiper belt object with abundant water ice and extreme topographic features
