= List of unnumbered trans-Neptunian objects: 2020 =

The following is a partial list of unnumbered trans-Neptunian objects for principal designations assigned within 2020. As of October 2026, it contains a total of 228 bodies. For more information see the description on the main page. Also see list for the previous and next year.

== 2020 ==
Designation	First Observed (discovered)		D (km)	Orbital description						Remarks	Refs
Designation	Date	Observer (Site)	D (km)	Class	a (AU)	e	i (°)	q (AU)	Q (AU)	Remarks	Refs
2020 AA_{33}	—	—	—	—	42.6	0.10	12	38.4	46.8	—	MPC; JPL
2020 AO_{32}	3 January 2020	COIAS,Subaru Telescope - Mauna Kea- (T09)	99	centaur	30.2	0.10	2	27.3	33.1	albedo: 0.058	MPC; JPL
2020 AV_{30}	3 January 2020	COIAS,Subaru Telescope (T09)	199	cubewano (hot)?	48.4	0.10	14	43.6	53.1	albedo: 0.079	MPC; JPL
2020 BA_{95}	25 January 2020	Maunakea (568)	265	SDO	56.6	0.35	18	36.7	76.4	albedo: 0.124	MPC; JPL
2020 BB_{95}	24 January 2020	Maunakea (568)	152	SDO	119.4	0.68	18	38.6	200.2	albedo: 0.124	MPC; JPL
2020 BC_{95}	23 January 2020	Maunakea (568)	161	SDO	90.6	0.56	26	40.1	141.1	albedo: 0.124	MPC; JPL
2020 BD_{155}	22 January 2020	COIAS,Subaru Telescope (T09)	77	cubewano (hot)?	42.3	0.03	19	40.9	43.6	albedo: 0.079	MPC; JPL
2020 BE_{102}	24 January 2020	Maunakea (568)	351	SDO	75.4	0.55	5	33.9	116.9	albedo: 0.124	MPC; JPL
2020 BF_{102}	23 January 2020	Maunakea (568)	131	SDO	56.9	0.31	22	39.2	74.5	albedo: 0.124	MPC; JPL
2020 BF_{157}	24 January 2020	COIAS,Subaru Telescope (T09)	17	centaur	98.2	0.87	34	13.0	183.4	albedo: 0.058	MPC; JPL
2020 BH_{157}	23 January 2020	COIAS,Subaru Telescope (T09)	180	SDO	54.9	0.31	18	37.7	72.0	albedo: 0.124	MPC; JPL
2020 BQ_{63}	30 January 2020	Korea Microlensing Telescope Network-CTIO (W93)	102	cubewano (cold)	42.8	0.03	3	41.4	44.2	albedo: 0.152	MPC; JPL
2020 BR_{60}	26 January 2020	Cerro Tololo Observatory, La Serena (807)	150	SDO	50.4	0.25	7	38.0	62.8	albedo: 0.124	MPC; JPL
2020 BS_{168}	30 January 2020	Subaru Telescope, Maunakea (T09)	47	other TNO	40.9	0.11	12	36.3	45.5	albedo: 0.13	MPC; JPL
2020 BS_{60}	26 January 2020	Cerro Tololo Observatory, La Serena (807)	191	SDO	68.5	0.54	21	31.6	105.4	albedo: 0.124	MPC; JPL
2020 BT_{175}	25 January 2020	COIAS,Subaru Telescope (T09)	108	SDO	75.2	0.51	9	36.7	113.8	albedo: 0.124	MPC; JPL
2020 BU_{175}	24 January 2020	COIAS,Subaru Telescope (T09)	112	SDO	135.2	0.73	20	36.8	233.7	albedo: 0.124	MPC; JPL
2020 BY_{101}	24 January 2020	Maunakea (568)	123	SDO	52.8	0.29	11	37.6	68.1	albedo: 0.124	MPC; JPL
2020 BZ_{94}	23 January 2020	Maunakea (568)	119	SDO	58.5	0.34	4	38.6	78.3	albedo: 0.124	MPC; JPL
2020 DD_{5}	29 February 2020	Kitt Peak-Bok (V00)	53	centaur	35.0	0.49	4	17.9	52.1	albedo: 0.058	MPC; JPL
2020 DH_{6}	28 February 2020	Korea Microlensing Telescope Network-CTIO (W93)	96	res · 5:9?	44.4	0.09	1	40.4	48.5	albedo: 0.126	MPC; JPL
2020 DJ_{6}	28 February 2020	Korea Microlensing Telescope Network-CTIO (W93)	131	cubewano (cold)	43.6	0.08	1	40.2	46.9	albedo: 0.152	MPC; JPL
2020 FA_{31}	24 March 2020	Maunakea (568)	314	SDO	72.1	0.46	20	39.2	104.9	albedo: 0.124	MPC; JPL
2020 FB_{31}	24 March 2020	Maunakea (568)	289	res · 3:8	57.9	0.39	16	35.6	80.2	albedo: 0.126	MPC; JPL
2020 FP_{40}	24 March 2020	Maunakea (568)	121	SDO	58.6	0.34	25	38.6	78.6	albedo: 0.124	MPC; JPL
2020 FP_{7}	21 March 2020	Pan-STARRS 1 (F51)	37	centaur	50.5	0.86	50	7.0	94.0	albedo: 0.058	MPC; JPL
2020 FQ_{38}	24 March 2020	Maunakea (568)	127	other TNO	48.9	0.26	9	36.1	61.7	albedo: 0.13	MPC; JPL
2020 FQ_{40}	24 March 2020	Maunakea (568)	225	SDO	65.9	0.41	43	38.8	93.0	albedo: 0.124	MPC; JPL
2020 FR_{40}	24 March 2020	Maunakea (568)	103	SDO	81.0	0.56	16	35.4	126.6	albedo: 0.124	MPC; JPL
2020 FY_{30}	24 March 2020	Maunakea (568)	428	res · 2:7	69.6	0.49	14	35.9	103.4	albedo: 0.126	MPC; JPL
2020 KA_{54}	30 May 2020	New Horizons KBO Search (266)	31	twotino?	46.9	0.14	11	40.4	53.5	albedo: 0.126	MPC; JPL
2020 KA_{55}	29 May 2020	New Horizons KBO Search (266)	19	other TNO	36.6	0.08	3	33.8	39.5	albedo: 0.13	MPC; JPL
2020 KA_{56}	28 May 2020	New Horizons KBO Search (266)	68	plutino	39.5	0.19	5	31.9	47.0	albedo: 0.074	MPC; JPL
2020 KB_{54}	30 May 2020	New Horizons KBO Search (266)	46	cubewano (cold)?	43.7	0.05	3	41.5	46.0	albedo: 0.152	MPC; JPL
2020 KB_{55}	29 May 2020	New Horizons KBO Search (266)	52	cubewano (hot)?	47.4	0.05	19	45.2	49.6	albedo: 0.079	MPC; JPL
2020 KB_{56}	28 May 2020	New Horizons KBO Search (266)	46	SDO	138.1	0.69	8	42.9	233.4	albedo: 0.124	MPC; JPL
2020 KC_{53}	29 May 2020	New Horizons KBO Search (266)	41	cubewano (cold)?	43.9	0.01	2	43.3	44.5	albedo: 0.152	MPC; JPL
2020 KC_{54}	28 May 2020	New Horizons KBO Search (266)	63	cubewano (cold)?	42.2	0.05	3	40.1	44.2	albedo: 0.152	MPC; JPL
2020 KC_{55}	29 May 2020	New Horizons KBO Search (266)	35	cubewano (cold)?	43.6	0.12	3	38.2	48.9	albedo: 0.152	MPC; JPL
2020 KC_{56}	28 May 2020	New Horizons KBO Search (266)	58	cubewano (hot)?	46.9	0.20	10	37.4	56.4	albedo: 0.079	MPC; JPL
2020 KD_{53}	29 May 2020	New Horizons KBO Search (266)	37	SDO	95.4	0.64	15	34.9	155.9	albedo: 0.124	MPC; JPL
2020 KD_{54}	30 May 2020	New Horizons KBO Search (266)	36	SDO	69.4	0.47	18	36.7	102.0	albedo: 0.124	MPC; JPL
2020 KD_{55}	30 May 2020	New Horizons KBO Search (266)	22	res · 3:4?	36.1	0.12	15	31.9	40.3	albedo: 0.126	MPC; JPL
2020 KD_{56}	30 May 2020	New Horizons KBO Search (266)	35	SDO	133.1	0.77	17	31.3	235.0	albedo: 0.124	MPC; JPL
2020 KE_{53}	26 May 2020	New Horizons KBO Search (266)	35	plutino	39.1	0.12	5	34.3	43.9	albedo: 0.074	MPC; JPL
2020 KE_{54}	26 May 2020	New Horizons KBO Search (266)	120	plutino	39.3	0.21	22	31.0	47.6	albedo: 0.074	MPC; JPL
2020 KE_{55}	29 May 2020	New Horizons KBO Search (266)	28	cubewano (cold)?	46.5	0.09	3	42.5	50.4	albedo: 0.152	MPC; JPL
2020 KE_{56}	30 May 2020	New Horizons KBO Search (266)	51	other TNO	38.8	0.15	7	32.9	44.6	albedo: 0.13	MPC; JPL
2020 KF_{53}	28 May 2020	New Horizons KBO Search (266)	40	cubewano (cold)?	44.4	0.11	1	39.6	49.2	albedo: 0.152	MPC; JPL
2020 KF_{54}	26 May 2020	New Horizons KBO Search (266)	49	cubewano (cold)?	43.5	0.12	3	38.4	48.6	albedo: 0.152	MPC; JPL
2020 KF_{55}	30 May 2020	New Horizons KBO Search (266)	45	cubewano (hot)?	45.6	0.21	13	36.2	55.0	albedo: 0.079	MPC; JPL
2020 KF_{56}	28 May 2020	New Horizons KBO Search (266)	46	cubewano (hot)?	42.6	0.04	10	41.1	44.2	albedo: 0.079	MPC; JPL
2020 KG_{53}	28 May 2020	New Horizons KBO Search (266)	69	cubewano (cold)?	44.4	0.11	2	39.6	49.2	albedo: 0.152	MPC; JPL
2020 KG_{54}	31 May 2020	New Horizons KBO Search (266)	26	SDO	77.2	0.58	23	32.2	122.3	albedo: 0.124	MPC; JPL
2020 KG_{55}	30 May 2020	New Horizons KBO Search (266)	29	other TNO	36.1	0.11	18	32.2	40.1	albedo: 0.13	MPC; JPL
2020 KG_{56}	30 May 2020	New Horizons KBO Search (266)	24	twotino	47.4	0.33	2	31.7	63.1	albedo: 0.126	MPC; JPL
2020 KH_{42}	31 May 2020	New Horizons KBO Search (266)	111	SDO	76.8	0.52	26	37.2	116.3	albedo: 0.124	MPC; JPL
2020 KH_{54}	29 May 2020	New Horizons KBO Search (266)	55	cubewano (cold)?	44.2	0.14	3	37.9	50.4	albedo: 0.152	MPC; JPL
2020 KH_{55}	29 May 2020	New Horizons KBO Search (266)	48	cubewano (cold)?	40.7	0.11	4	36.2	45.1	albedo: 0.152	MPC; JPL
2020 KH_{56}	28 May 2020	New Horizons KBO Search (266)	36	SDO	55.6	0.42	3	32.5	78.7	albedo: 0.124	MPC; JPL
2020 KJ_{54}	29 May 2020	New Horizons KBO Search (266)	46	cubewano (cold)?	42.6	0.04	2	41.1	44.1	albedo: 0.152	MPC; JPL
2020 KJ_{55}	29 May 2020	New Horizons KBO Search (266)	42	SDO	57.2	0.45	2	31.3	83.0	albedo: 0.124	MPC; JPL
2020 KJ_{56}	28 May 2020	New Horizons KBO Search (266)	168	cubewano (cold)	43.8	0.02	3	42.8	44.9	albedo: 0.152	MPC; JPL
2020 KJ_{60}	28 May 2020	New Horizons KBO Search (266)	61	cubewano (cold)?	44.8	0.12	3	39.7	50.0	albedo: 0.152	MPC; JPL
2020 KK_{54}	29 May 2020	New Horizons KBO Search (266)	67	cubewano (hot)?	43.7	0.15	6	37.1	50.2	albedo: 0.079	MPC; JPL
2020 KK_{55}	29 May 2020	New Horizons KBO Search (266)	20	SDO	76.0	0.56	4	33.8	118.2	albedo: 0.124	MPC; JPL
2020 KK_{60}	29 May 2020	New Horizons KBO Search (266)	97	SDO	64.9	0.48	4	33.7	96.0	albedo: 0.124	MPC; JPL
2020 KL_{53}	26 May 2020	New Horizons KBO Search (266)	91	cubewano (cold)	43.3	0.04	2	41.8	44.9	albedo: 0.152	MPC; JPL
2020 KL_{54}	28 May 2020	New Horizons KBO Search (266)	52	cubewano (hot)?	43.4	0.12	7	38.2	48.7	albedo: 0.079	MPC; JPL
2020 KL_{55}	29 May 2020	New Horizons KBO Search (266)	64	centaur	164.3	0.86	3	23.3	305.3	albedo: 0.058	MPC; JPL
2020 KM_{53}	29 May 2020	New Horizons KBO Search (266)	53	cubewano (cold)	44.3	0.06	2	41.8	46.7	albedo: 0.152	MPC; JPL
2020 KM_{54}	30 May 2020	New Horizons KBO Search (266)	43	cubewano (hot)?	45.6	0.14	6	39.4	51.8	albedo: 0.079	MPC; JPL
2020 KM_{55}	29 May 2020	New Horizons KBO Search (266)	43	cubewano (cold)?	45.6	0.10	3	40.9	50.3	albedo: 0.152	MPC; JPL
2020 KN_{53}	28 May 2020	New Horizons KBO Search (266)	71	cubewano (hot)?	42.7	0.09	9	38.7	46.7	albedo: 0.079	MPC; JPL
2020 KN_{55}	29 May 2020	New Horizons KBO Search (266)	97	cubewano (hot)?	40.9	0.10	27	36.9	44.9	albedo: 0.079	MPC; JPL
2020 KO_{11}	29 May 2020	New Horizons KBO Search (266)	93	cubewano (hot)?	44.6	0.15	7	38.0	51.2	albedo: 0.079	MPC; JPL
2020 KO_{53}	29 May 2020	New Horizons KBO Search (266)	75	cubewano (hot)?	47.9	0.11	12	42.6	53.2	albedo: 0.079	MPC; JPL
2020 KO_{54}	28 May 2020	New Horizons KBO Search (266)	26	centaur	38.4	0.29	7	27.4	49.5	albedo: 0.058	MPC; JPL
2020 KO_{55}	29 May 2020	New Horizons KBO Search (266)	44	twotino	47.4	0.21	6	37.3	57.4	albedo: 0.126	MPC; JPL
2020 KP_{11}	26 May 2020	New Horizons KBO Search (266)	117	cubewano (hot)?	45.3	0.17	22	37.7	52.8	albedo: 0.079	MPC; JPL
2020 KP_{53}	29 May 2020	New Horizons KBO Search (266)	38	cubewano (cold)?	45.8	0.16	4	38.3	53.3	albedo: 0.152	MPC; JPL
2020 KP_{54}	28 May 2020	New Horizons KBO Search (266)	29	cubewano (cold)?	43.0	0.11	3	38.2	47.8	albedo: 0.152	MPC; JPL
2020 KP_{55}	29 May 2020	New Horizons KBO Search (266)	35	twotino	47.5	0.37	4	30.1	65.0	albedo: 0.126	MPC; JPL
2020 KQ_{11}	29 May 2020	New Horizons KBO Search (266)	182	res · 5:9	44.3	0.12	3	39.2	49.4	albedo: 0.126	MPC; JPL
2020 KQ_{54}	30 May 2020	New Horizons KBO Search (266)	30	cubewano (cold)?	44.1	0.04	3	42.3	45.9	albedo: 0.152	MPC; JPL
2020 KQ_{55}	29 May 2020	New Horizons KBO Search (266)	48	cubewano (hot)?	45.2	0.07	9	42.3	48.2	albedo: 0.079	MPC; JPL
2020 KR_{11}	30 May 2020	New Horizons KBO Search (266)	151	cubewano (hot)?	46.2	0.09	6	42.2	50.1	albedo: 0.079	MPC; JPL
2020 KR_{54}	28 May 2020	New Horizons KBO Search (266)	34	cubewano (cold)?	43.7	0.06	2	41.1	46.4	albedo: 0.152	MPC; JPL
2020 KR_{55}	26 May 2020	New Horizons KBO Search (266)	41	cubewano (hot)?	42.3	0.08	18	38.9	45.7	albedo: 0.079	MPC; JPL
2020 KS_{11}	29 May 2020	New Horizons KBO Search (266)	56	res · 1:6	99.2	0.65	3	34.7	163.6	albedo: 0.126	MPC; JPL
2020 KS_{53}	30 May 2020	New Horizons KBO Search (266)	99	cubewano (hot)?	44.3	0.03	6	42.8	45.8	albedo: 0.079	MPC; JPL
2020 KS_{54}	28 May 2020	New Horizons KBO Search (266)	46	cubewano (hot)?	41.5	0.10	19	37.5	45.6	albedo: 0.079	MPC; JPL
2020 KS_{55}	26 May 2020	New Horizons KBO Search (266)	42	SDO	59.7	0.38	25	36.9	82.6	albedo: 0.124	MPC; JPL
2020 KT_{11}	26 May 2020	New Horizons KBO Search (266)	67	cubewano (hot)?	42.8	0.22	28	33.4	52.2	albedo: 0.079	MPC; JPL
2020 KT_{53}	31 May 2020	New Horizons KBO Search (266)	56	cubewano (cold)?	43.6	0.08	5	40.0	47.2	albedo: 0.152	MPC; JPL
2020 KT_{54}	28 May 2020	New Horizons KBO Search (266)	26	other TNO	40.2	0.09	18	36.5	43.9	albedo: 0.13	MPC; JPL
2020 KT_{55}	28 May 2020	New Horizons KBO Search (266)	61	SDO	53.0	0.38	5	32.8	73.2	albedo: 0.124	MPC; JPL
2020 KU_{11}	26 May 2020	New Horizons KBO Search (266)	49	cubewano (hot)?	43.9	0.17	16	36.4	51.4	albedo: 0.079	MPC; JPL
2020 KU_{53}	29 May 2020	New Horizons KBO Search (266)	61	cubewano (cold)?	44.0	0.09	3	40.1	48.0	albedo: 0.152	MPC; JPL
2020 KU_{54}	30 May 2020	New Horizons KBO Search (266)	33	cubewano (hot)?	44.6	0.14	7	38.4	50.9	albedo: 0.079	MPC; JPL
2020 KU_{55}	30 May 2020	New Horizons KBO Search (266)	56	cubewano (hot)?	44.3	0.01	6	44.1	44.5	albedo: 0.079	MPC; JPL
2020 KU_{7}	25 May 2020	Pan-STARRS 1 (F51)	6	damocloid	33.9	0.88	104	4.2	63.6	albedo: 0.048	MPC; JPL
2020 KV_{11}	29 May 2020	New Horizons KBO Search (266)	132	SDO	94.9	0.62	5	35.7	154.1	albedo: 0.124	MPC; JPL
2020 KV_{53}	26 May 2020	New Horizons KBO Search (266)	46	cubewano (cold)?	44.8	0.10	4	40.4	49.2	albedo: 0.152	MPC; JPL
2020 KV_{54}	28 May 2020	New Horizons KBO Search (266)	54	centaur	53.6	0.45	5	29.3	77.8	albedo: 0.058	MPC; JPL
2020 KV_{55}	28 May 2020	New Horizons KBO Search (266)	82	cubewano (hot)?	41.2	0.07	18	38.3	44.0	albedo: 0.079	MPC; JPL
2020 KW_{11}	29 May 2020	New Horizons KBO Search-Subaru (266)	53	cubewano (cold)?	45.0	0.12	5	39.5	50.4	albedo: 0.152	MPC; JPL
2020 KW_{53}	28 May 2020	New Horizons KBO Search (266)	58	cubewano (hot)?	43.9	0.06	5	41.2	46.5	albedo: 0.079	MPC; JPL
2020 KW_{54}	30 May 2020	New Horizons KBO Search (266)	33	SDO	170.1	0.75	6	43.0	297.1	albedo: 0.124	MPC; JPL
2020 KW_{55}	30 May 2020	New Horizons KBO Search (266)	73	centaur	90.7	0.71	2	26.0	155.3	albedo: 0.058	MPC; JPL
2020 KX_{11}	29 May 2020	New Horizons KBO Search-Subaru (266)	169	damocloid	661.7	0.99	48	4.8	1318.6	albedo: 0.048	MPC; JPL
2020 KX_{53}	29 May 2020	New Horizons KBO Search (266)	38	cubewano (cold)?	57.3	0.47	4	30.7	83.9	albedo: 0.152	MPC; JPL
2020 KX_{54}	30 May 2020	New Horizons KBO Search (266)	30	cubewano (cold)?	43.8	0.05	3	41.8	45.8	albedo: 0.152	MPC; JPL
2020 KX_{55}	28 May 2020	New Horizons KBO Search (266)	61	SDO	66.3	0.47	3	35.4	97.2	albedo: 0.124	MPC; JPL
2020 KY_{11}	30 May 2020	New Horizons KBO Search-Subaru (266)	93	cubewano (hot)?	45.9	0.11	9	40.8	51.1	albedo: 0.079	MPC; JPL
2020 KY_{53}	30 May 2020	New Horizons KBO Search (266)	44	centaur	48.4	0.52	5	23.2	73.7	albedo: 0.058	MPC; JPL
2020 KY_{54}	29 May 2020	New Horizons KBO Search (266)	45	centaur	125.4	0.82	4	23.1	227.8	albedo: 0.058	MPC; JPL
2020 KY_{55}	28 May 2020	New Horizons KBO Search (266)	33	cubewano (cold)?	46.3	0.17	4	38.5	54.2	albedo: 0.152	MPC; JPL
2020 KZ_{53}	30 May 2020	New Horizons KBO Search (266)	32	SDO	59.2	0.37	4	37.4	80.9	albedo: 0.124	MPC; JPL
2020 KZ_{54}	29 May 2020	New Horizons KBO Search (266)	65	cubewano (hot)?	45.6	0.11	10	40.7	50.6	albedo: 0.079	MPC; JPL
2020 KZ_{55}	30 May 2020	New Horizons KBO Search (266)	81	cubewano (hot)?	40.8	0.10	17	36.6	45.0	albedo: 0.079	MPC; JPL
2020 LA_{21}	1 June 2020	New Horizons KBO Search (266)	54	centaur	93.9	0.71	4	27.3	160.6	albedo: 0.058	MPC; JPL
2020 LB_{21}	1 June 2020	New Horizons KBO Search (266)	59	centaur	45.9	0.65	7	16.3	75.6	albedo: 0.058	MPC; JPL
2020 MA_{53}	20 June 2020	New Horizons KBO Search (266)	42	other TNO	40.0	0.29	2	28.6	51.5	albedo: 0.13	MPC; JPL
2020 MB_{53}	20 June 2020	New Horizons KBO Search (266)	36	other TNO	48.8	0.25	16	36.4	61.1	albedo: 0.13	MPC; JPL
2020 MC_{53}	20 June 2020	New Horizons KBO Search (266)	111	cubewano (hot)?	42.7	0.11	6	37.9	47.5	albedo: 0.079	MPC; JPL
2020 MD_{53}	20 June 2020	New Horizons KBO Search (266)	33	cubewano (cold)?	44.4	0.13	5	38.7	50.1	albedo: 0.152	MPC; JPL
2020 ME_{53}	20 June 2020	New Horizons KBO Search (266)	38	cubewano (cold)?	41.8	0.09	4	38.2	45.3	albedo: 0.152	MPC; JPL
2020 MF_{53}	20 June 2020	New Horizons KBO Search (266)	77	SDO	46.2	0.36	27	29.5	62.9	albedo: 0.124	MPC; JPL
2020 MG_{53}	24 June 2020	New Horizons KBO Search (266)	43	cubewano (cold)?	42.7	0.08	5	39.1	46.3	albedo: 0.152	MPC; JPL
2020 MH_{53}	20 June 2020	New Horizons KBO Search (266)	40	cubewano (cold)?	44.4	0.08	2	40.8	47.9	albedo: 0.152	MPC; JPL
2020 MJ_{53}	22 June 2020	New Horizons KBO Search (266)	136	SDO	81.9	0.10	7	73.3	90.4	albedo: 0.124	MPC; JPL
2020 MK_{53}	22 June 2020	New Horizons KBO Search (266)	566	SDO	110.0	0.45	19	60.2	159.8	albedo: 0.124	MPC; JPL
2020 ML_{1}	16 June 2020	Pan-STARRS 1 (F51)	1.8	damocloid	54.8	0.95	83	2.5	107.0	albedo: 0.048	MPC; JPL
2020 ML_{53}	22 June 2020	New Horizons KBO Search (266)	31	cubewano (cold)?	43.0	0.11	4	38.4	47.6	albedo: 0.152	MPC; JPL
2020 MM_{53}	20 June 2020	New Horizons KBO Search (266)	44	centaur	37.7	0.28	2	27.2	48.1	albedo: 0.058	MPC; JPL
2020 MN_{53}	22 June 2020	New Horizons KBO Search (266)	24	other TNO	35.4	0.11	19	31.5	39.3	albedo: 0.13	MPC; JPL
2020 MO_{53}	21 June 2020	New Horizons KBO Search (266)	46	cubewano (cold)?	46.2	0.11	3	40.9	51.5	albedo: 0.152	MPC; JPL
2020 MP_{53}	22 June 2020	New Horizons KBO Search (266)	69	centaur	33.6	0.67	21	11.1	56.0	albedo: 0.058	MPC; JPL
2020 MQ_{53}	20 June 2020	New Horizons KBO Search (266)	70	EDDO	723.3	0.92	74	55.6	1391.1	albedo: 0.124	MPC; JPL
2020 MS_{66}	25 June 2020	New Horizons KBO Search-Subaru (266)	41	cubewano (hot)?	41.5	0.09	5	37.9	45.2	albedo: 0.079	MPC; JPL
2020 MY_{52}	20 June 2020	New Horizons KBO Search (266)	48	cubewano (hot)?	42.7	0.14	22	36.7	48.6	albedo: 0.079	MPC; JPL
2020 MZ_{52}	22 June 2020	New Horizons KBO Search (266)	45	other TNO	40.1	0.25	14	30.2	50.0	albedo: 0.13	MPC; JPL
2020 PC_{95}	12 August 2020	New Horizons KBO Search (266)	38	SDO	48.9	0.30	5	34.1	63.8	albedo: 0.124	MPC; JPL
2020 PD_{95}	13 August 2020	New Horizons KBO Search (266)	102	SDO	67.1	0.12	13	59.2	75.1	albedo: 0.124	MPC; JPL
2020 PE_{95}	13 August 2020	New Horizons KBO Search (266)	65	plutino?	39.5	0.11	7	35.3	43.8	albedo: 0.074	MPC; JPL
2020 PF_{95}	13 August 2020	New Horizons KBO Search (266)	76	other TNO	49.7	0.10	15	44.7	54.7	albedo: 0.13	MPC; JPL
2020 PG_{95}	12 August 2020	New Horizons KBO Search (266)	29	other TNO	51.2	0.15	3	43.4	59.0	albedo: 0.13	MPC; JPL
2020 QH_{83}	16 August 2020	Lowell Discovery Telescope (G37)	150	plutino	39.2	0.25	23	29.3	49.1	albedo: 0.074	MPC; JPL
2020 QN_{6}	18 August 2020	Pan-STARRS 1 (F51)	7	damocloid	407.1	0.99	77	4.8	809.5	albedo: 0.048	MPC; JPL
2020 SE_{35}	21 September 2020	Lowell Discovery Telescope (G37)	74	res · 3:5	42.4	0.19	8	34.3	50.6	albedo: 0.126	MPC; JPL
2020 TZ_{114}	7 October 2020	University of Arizona Mt. Lemmon Survey (G96)	388	plutino	39.4	0.05	16	37.5	41.2	albedo: 0.074	MPC; JPL
2020 UC_{74}	20 October 2020	DECam (W84)	64	cubewano (hot)	44.1	0.13	22	38.6	49.6	albedo: 0.079	MPC; JPL
2020 UD_{74}	20 October 2020	DECam (W84)	81	plutino?	39.3	0.01	11	39.0	39.6	albedo: 0.074	MPC; JPL
2020 UE_{74}	20 October 2020	DECam (W84)	53	cubewano (cold)	43.8	0.07	3	40.8	46.7	albedo: 0.152	MPC; JPL
2020 UF_{74}	17 October 2020	DECam (W84)	49	cubewano (cold)	44.0	0.07	2	40.8	47.3	albedo: 0.152	MPC; JPL
2020 UG_{74}	20 October 2020	DECam (W84)	72	cubewano (cold)?	44.3	0.07	3	41.3	47.2	albedo: 0.152	MPC; JPL
2020 UH_{74}	20 October 2020	DECam (W84)	83	cubewano (cold)?	42.6	0.04	4	40.8	44.3	albedo: 0.152	MPC; JPL
2020 UJ_{74}	20 October 2020	DECam (W84)	66	SDO	52.3	0.33	12	34.9	69.6	albedo: 0.124	MPC; JPL
2020 UQ_{100}	—	—	—	—	44.5	0.08	2	40.8	48.2	—	MPC; JPL
2020 UT_{74}	20 October 2020	DECam (W84)	54	cubewano (cold)?	48.0	0.18	4	39.3	56.6	albedo: 0.152	MPC; JPL
2020 UX_{73}	17 October 2020	DECam (W84)	47	other TNO	37.8	0.08	26	34.7	40.8	albedo: 0.13	MPC; JPL
2020 UY_{73}	17 October 2020	DECam (W84)	40	cubewano (cold)	43.1	0.04	1	41.5	44.6	albedo: 0.152	MPC; JPL
2020 UZ_{73}	18 October 2020	DECam (W84)	82	cubewano (cold)	46.5	0.08	1	43.0	50.0	albedo: 0.152	MPC; JPL
2020 VA_{45}	—	—	—	—	45.6	0.17	28	37.9	53.3	—	MPC; JPL
2020 VA_{46}	—	—	—	—	39.8	0.33	24	26.8	52.8	—	MPC; JPL
2020 VB_{45}	—	—	—	—	43.7	0.08	20	40.0	47.3	—	MPC; JPL
2020 VB_{46}	—	—	—	—	46.4	0.09	20	42.2	50.7	—	MPC; JPL
2020 VC_{45}	—	—	—	—	47.0	0.22	31	36.8	57.1	—	MPC; JPL
2020 VC_{46}	—	—	—	—	48.0	0.22	17	37.7	58.4	—	MPC; JPL
2020 VD_{45}	—	—	—	—	39.7	0.23	18	30.4	49.0	—	MPC; JPL
2020 VD_{46}	—	—	—	—	111.4	0.62	32	42.3	180.6	—	MPC; JPL
2020 VE_{45}	—	—	—	—	40.8	0.06	21	38.3	43.2	—	MPC; JPL
2020 VE_{46}	—	—	—	—	39.7	0.03	26	38.3	41.0	—	MPC; JPL
2020 VF_{45}	—	—	—	—	46.5	0.22	18	36.1	57.0	—	MPC; JPL
2020 VF_{46}	—	—	—	—	42.7	0.11	18	38.2	47.3	—	MPC; JPL
2020 VG_{45}	—	—	—	—	42.8	0.14	27	36.6	48.9	—	MPC; JPL
2020 VG_{46}	—	—	—	—	39.6	0.29	18	28.2	51.0	—	MPC; JPL
2020 VH_{45}	—	—	—	—	55.8	0.19	46	45.2	66.4	—	MPC; JPL
2020 VH_{46}	—	—	—	—	48.0	0.31	18	33.1	62.9	—	MPC; JPL
2020 VJ_{46}	—	—	—	—	30.6	0.78	21	6.9	54.4	—	MPC; JPL
2020 VK_{40}	9 November 2020	Cerro Tololo-DECam (W84)	143	other TNO	51.4	0.10	32	46.2	56.7	albedo: 0.13	MPC; JPL
2020 VK_{44}	—	—	—	—	44.1	0.19	22	35.6	52.7	—	MPC; JPL
2020 VK_{45}	—	—	—	—	30.3	0.05	24	28.7	31.9	—	MPC; JPL
2020 VK_{46}	—	—	—	—	39.7	0.23	22	30.5	48.9	—	MPC; JPL
2020 VL_{26}	13 November 2020	Cerro Tololo Observatory, La Serena (807)	100	centaur	55.4	0.69	20	17.5	93.3	albedo: 0.058	MPC; JPL
2020 VL_{40}	9 November 2020	Cerro Tololo-DECam (W84)	96	cubewano (cold)?	43.1	0.09	2	39.1	47.1	albedo: 0.152	MPC; JPL
2020 VL_{44}	—	—	—	—	53.0	0.28	23	38.0	68.1	—	MPC; JPL
2020 VL_{45}	—	—	—	—	45.9	0.16	22	38.4	53.4	—	MPC; JPL
2020 VL_{46}	—	—	—	—	39.5	0.22	16	30.7	48.2	—	MPC; JPL
2020 VM_{44}	—	—	—	—	40.7	0.13	21	35.6	45.8	—	MPC; JPL
2020 VM_{45}	—	—	—	—	41.0	0.10	18	36.7	45.2	—	MPC; JPL
2020 VM_{46}	—	—	—	—	126.9	0.72	24	35.7	218.1	—	MPC; JPL
2020 VN40	9 November 2020	Canada-France-Hawaii Telescope, Maunakea (T14)	73	SDO	144.0	0.73	33	38.3	249.8	albedo: 0.124	MPC; JPL
2020 VN_{44}	—	—	—	—	36.7	0.20	22	29.4	44.1	—	MPC; JPL
2020 VN_{45}	—	—	—	—	30.3	0.04	21	29.1	31.6	—	MPC; JPL
2020 VN_{46}	—	—	—	—	39.4	0.19	29	31.8	46.9	—	MPC; JPL
2020 VO_{44}	—	—	—	—	46.0	0.03	24	44.8	47.2	—	MPC; JPL
2020 VO_{45}	—	—	—	—	42.0	0.08	21	38.6	45.4	—	MPC; JPL
2020 VP_{44}	—	—	—	—	36.6	0.06	20	34.4	38.8	—	MPC; JPL
2020 VP_{45}	—	—	—	—	38.8	0.09	25	35.3	42.3	—	MPC; JPL
2020 VQ_{40}	10 November 2020	Canada-France-Hawaii Telescope, Maunakea (T14)	111	plutino	39.8	0.21	21	31.4	48.2	albedo: 0.074	MPC; JPL
2020 VQ_{44}	—	—	—	—	41.9	0.11	29	37.5	46.3	—	MPC; JPL
2020 VQ_{45}	—	—	—	—	44.5	0.20	25	35.6	53.5	—	MPC; JPL
2020 VR_{40}	9 November 2020	Canada-France-Hawaii Telescope, Maunakea (T14)	88	plutino	39.8	0.24	30	30.2	49.3	albedo: 0.074	MPC; JPL
2020 VR_{44}	—	—	—	—	45.7	0.06	23	42.8	48.5	—	MPC; JPL
2020 VR_{45}	—	—	—	—	45.6	0.27	22	33.5	57.7	—	MPC; JPL
2020 VS_{40}	9 November 2020	Canada-France-Hawaii Telescope, Maunakea (T14)	50	plutino	39.9	0.33	19	26.7	53.1	albedo: 0.074	MPC; JPL
2020 VS_{44}	—	—	—	—	50.0	0.25	34	37.7	62.4	—	MPC; JPL
2020 VS_{45}	—	—	—	—	36.7	0.09	22	33.5	39.9	—	MPC; JPL
2020 VT_{40}	9 November 2020	Canada-France-Hawaii Telescope, Maunakea (T14)	78	plutino	39.8	0.35	30	25.9	53.7	albedo: 0.074	MPC; JPL
2020 VT_{44}	—	—	—	—	44.0	0.30	20	30.6	57.3	—	MPC; JPL
2020 VT_{45}	—	—	—	—	51.3	0.36	18	33.1	69.6	—	MPC; JPL
2020 VU_{44}	—	—	—	—	38.3	0.07	33	35.6	41.0	—	MPC; JPL
2020 VU_{45}	—	—	—	—	45.8	0.12	21	40.4	51.2	—	MPC; JPL
2020 VV_{44}	—	—	—	—	41.7	0.11	21	37.2	46.2	—	MPC; JPL
2020 VV_{45}	—	—	—	—	37.8	0.26	25	28.1	47.4	—	MPC; JPL
2020 VW_{44}	—	—	—	—	80.3	0.46	37	43.6	117.1	—	MPC; JPL
2020 VW_{45}	—	—	—	—	47.4	0.16	21	39.8	54.9	—	MPC; JPL
2020 VX_{44}	—	—	—	—	48.0	0.19	19	38.7	57.4	—	MPC; JPL
2020 VY_{44}	—	—	—	—	46.3	0.19	33	37.3	55.3	—	MPC; JPL
2020 VY_{45}	—	—	—	—	41.6	0.04	15	40.1	43.0	—	MPC; JPL
2020 VZ_{44}	—	—	—	—	55.7	0.38	28	34.6	76.9	—	MPC; JPL
2020 VZ_{45}	—	—	—	—	47.2	0.20	16	37.8	56.6	—	MPC; JPL
2020 WM_{18}	16 November 2020	Cerro Tololo Observatory, La Serena (807)	150	SDO	51.0	0.32	13	34.6	67.4	albedo: 0.124	MPC; JPL
2020 XU_{19}	9 December 2020	Lowell Discovery Telescope (G37)	77	cubewano (cold)?	49.0	0.13	2	42.4	55.5	albedo: 0.152	MPC; JPL
2020 YF_{36}	16 December 2020	New Horizons KBO Search (269)	184	SDO	65.5	0.09	13	59.5	71.6	albedo: 0.124	MPC; JPL
2020 YP_{30}	17 December 2020	Maunakea (568)	123	twotino	48.2	0.25	8	36.2	60.2	albedo: 0.126	MPC; JPL

back to top
