= (523731) 2014 OK394 =

Trans-Neptunian object

(523731) 2014 OK_{394}
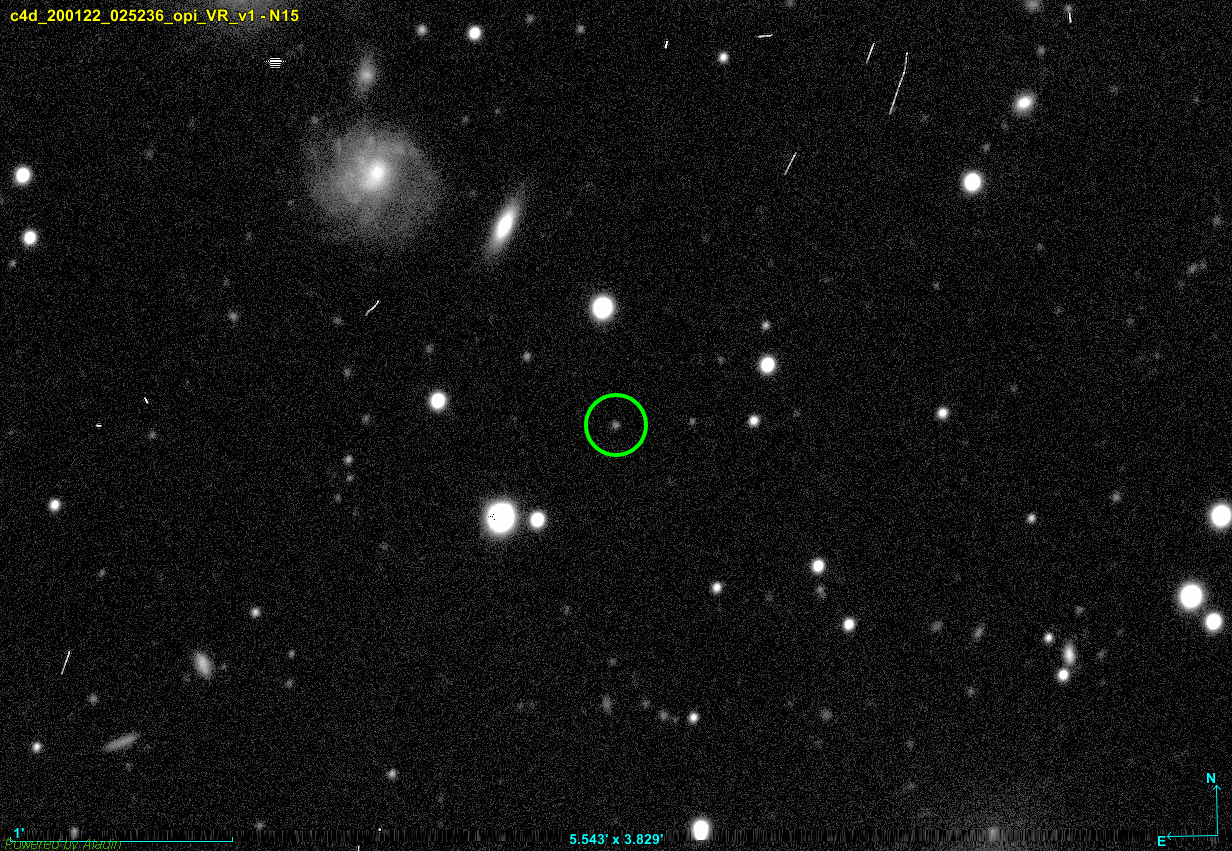
- 2014 OK_{394} photographed by Cerro Tololo Observatory's Dark Energy Camera on 22 January 2020

Discovery
- Discovered by: Spacewatch
- Discovery site: Kitt Peak Obs.
- Discovery date: 20 September 1995

Designations
- Alternative designations: 1995 SN_{55}
- Minor planet category: 3:5 resonant · TNO · distant

Orbital characteristics
- Epoch 9 June 2026 (JD 2461200.5)
- Uncertainty parameter 2
- Observation arc: 21.10 yr (7,708 days)
- Aphelion: 49.698 AU
- Perihelion: 35.528 AU
- Semi-major axis: 42.613 AU
- Eccentricity: 0.166
- Orbital period (sidereal): 278.18 yr
- Mean anomaly: 36.246°
- Mean motion: 0° 0^{m} 12.755^{s} / day
- Inclination: 4.134°
- Longitude of ascending node: 128.550°
- Time of perihelion: ≈ 4 January 1997
- Argument of perihelion: 250.384°
- Known satellites: 0

Physical characteristics
- Mean diameter: 160–280 km (est. 0.08–0.20)
- Absolute magnitude (H): 6.2

(523731) 2014 OK_{394}, also known as 1995 SN_{55}, is a trans-Neptunian object located in the Kuiper belt. It orbits the Sun in a 3:5 orbital resonance with Neptune, meaning it completes three orbits for every five completed by Neptune. It was discovered by Spacewatch at Kitt Peak, Arizona on 20 September 1995, but astronomers lost track of it for over a decade. It was unknowingly rediscovered by Pan-STARRS in 2010 and was later linked back to Spacewatch's 1995 discovery in 2020.

== Discovery ==
The object was discovered twice and therefore has two provisional designations. It was first discovered on 20 September 1995 by astronomers Nichole Danzl and Arianna Gleason of the Spacewatch survey at Kitt Peak Observatory in Arizona, United States. However, it was only observed 14 times over 36 days, from 20 September to 26 October 1995. The object was never seen again and thus became a lost minor planet. The Minor Planet Center (MPC) gave it the provisional designation 1995 SN_{55} and published the discovery observations on 11 June 1999. Due to the sparse amount of observations, 1995 SN_{55}'s calculated orbit was extremely uncertain. Astronomers had speculated that 1995 SN_{55} might either be one of the largest known centaurs, a temporarily brightening object, or a false positive caused by image noise.

On 8 October 2010, the object was unknowingly rediscovered by the Pan-STARRS 1 survey at Haleakalā Observatory, Hawaii. Pan-STARRS continued observing the object until 2015, and the MPC later announced its discovery with the provisional designation 2014 OK_{394} on 17 July 2016. In 2018, after the object's orbit was securely determined, the MPC assigned the official discovery credit to Pan-STARRS. On 30 November 2020, amateur astronomers S. Deen and K. Ly identified 2014 OK_{394} as being the same object as 1995 SN_{55}. This identification was published by the MPC on 27 January 2021 and the object's discoverer was later changed to Spacewatch.

== Numbering and naming ==
2014 OK_{394} was numbered by the MPC on 25 September 2018 and received the number 523731 in the minor planet catalog. The provisional designation 1995 SN_{55} was added by the MPC on 27 January 2021 after the two discoveries were linked. As of 2026, it has not been named.

== Classification and orbit ==
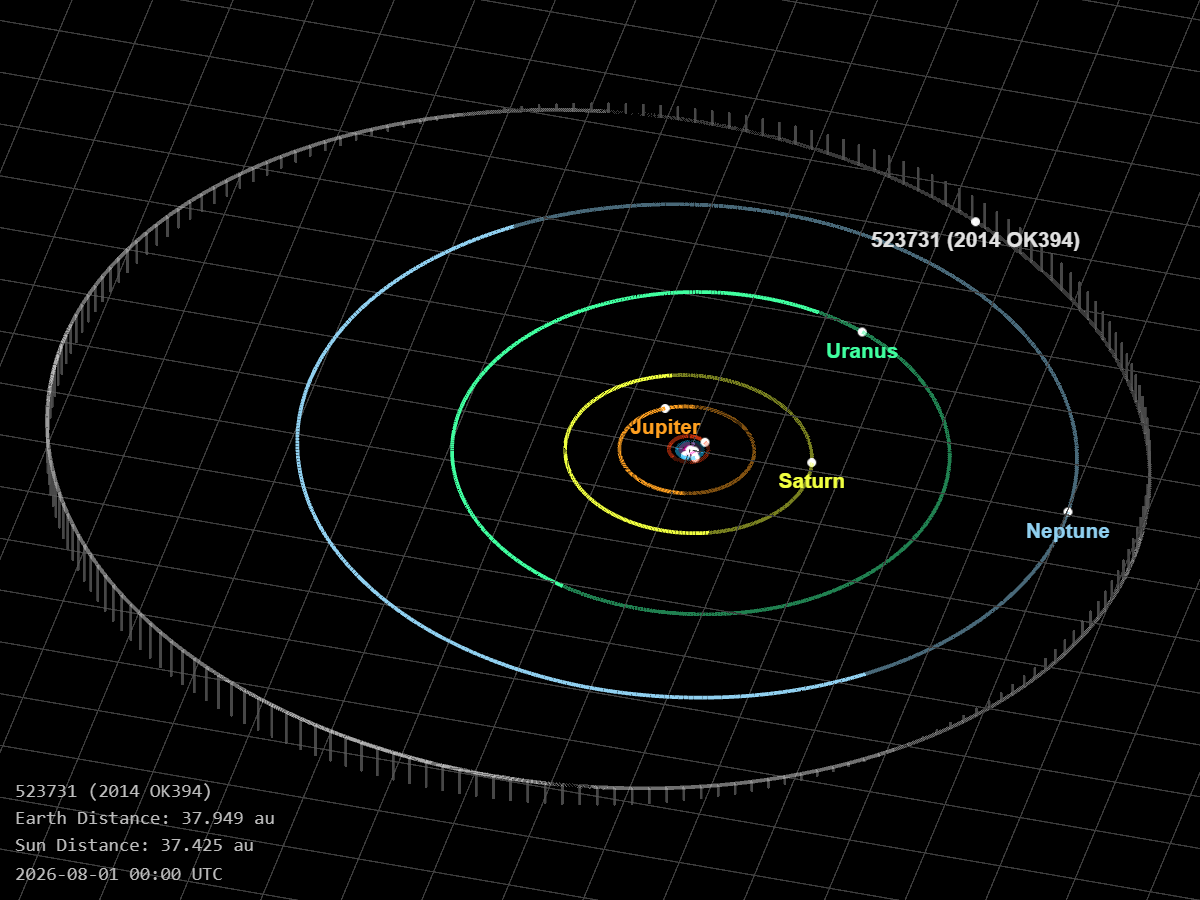
Orbit diagram of 2014 OK_{394} (white) and the outer planets

2014 OK_{394} orbits the Sun with an average distance (semi-major axis) of 42.6 astronomical units (AU) and an orbital period of 278 years. It is located in the Kuiper belt, a region of the Solar System beyond Neptune where many other icy minor planets are found. 2014 OK_{394}'s orbit has an eccentricity of 0.17 and an inclination of 4° with respect to the ecliptic plane. Over the course of its orbit, its distance from the Sun ranges from 35.5 AU at perihelion to 49.7 AU at aphelion. 2014 OK_{394} is in a 3:5 mean-motion orbital resonance with Neptune, meaning it completes three orbits every time Neptune completes five. Its orbit has a minimum orbit intersection distance approximately 5.8 AU (870 million km; 540 million mi) from Neptune's orbital path.

== Physical characteristics ==
Little is known about 2014 OK_{394}'s physical characteristics. Johnston's Archive estimates a diameter of 217 km (135 mi) assuming a geometric albedo of 0.126, whereas Michael E. Brown estimates a diameter of 160 km (99 mi) for an assumed albedo of 0.20. A 2024 study led by Audrey Thirouin and Scott Sheppard found that 2014 OK_{394} exhibits little variability in brightness over four hours of observations, with a light curve amplitude of roughly 0.05 magnitude.

== See also ==
- Lost minor planet
- (392741) 2012 SQ31 – main-belt asteroid originally misidentified as a trans-Neptunian object
