= List of unnumbered trans-Neptunian objects: 2021 =

The following is a partial list of unnumbered trans-Neptunian objects for principal designations assigned within 2021. As of November 2026, it contains a total of 207 bodies. For more information see the description on the main page. Also see list for the previous and next year.

== 2021 ==
Designation	First Observed (discovered)		D (km)	Orbital description						Remarks	Refs
Designation	Date	Observer (Site)	D (km)	Class	a (AU)	e	i (°)	q (AU)	Q (AU)	Remarks	Refs
2021 AN_{28}	12 January 2021	Maunakea (568)	40	cubewano (cold)?	34.0	0.10	2	30.6	37.5	albedo: 0.152	MPC; JPL
2021 BK_{15}	18 January 2021	Las Campanas Observatory (304)	126	res · 2:5	55.6	0.38	12	34.7	76.4	albedo: 0.126	MPC; JPL
2021 CG_{56}	15 February 2021	Maunakea (568)	131	SDO	57.1	0.35	13	37.4	76.8	albedo: 0.124	MPC; JPL
2021 CJ_{46}	15 February 2021	Maunakea (568)	265	cubewano (cold)	44.2	0.04	3	42.4	45.9	albedo: 0.152	MPC; JPL
2021 CK_{46}	15 February 2021	Maunakea (568)	266	res · 2:7	70.1	0.49	23	36.0	104.2	albedo: 0.126	MPC; JPL
2021 CL_{46}	15 February 2021	Maunakea (568)	169	SDO	56.9	0.40	9	34.1	79.7	albedo: 0.124	MPC; JPL
2021 CP_{40}	15 February 2021	Maunakea (568)	150	other TNO	55.5	0.16	38	46.7	64.4	albedo: 0.13	MPC; JPL
2021 CP_{5}	7 February 2021	Pan-STARRS 1 (F51)	20	centaur	414.8	0.98	9	10.6	819.0	albedo: 0.058	MPC; JPL
2021 DF_{26}	17 February 2021	Subaru Telescope, Maunakea (T09)	78	cubewano (cold)?	43.2	0.13	3	37.8	48.6	albedo: 0.152	MPC; JPL
2021 DG_{17}	17 February 2021	Maunakea (568)	372	SDO	62.4	0.23	30	48.2	76.6	albedo: 0.124	MPC; JPL
2021 DG_{26}	17 February 2021	Subaru Telescope, Maunakea (T09)	133	other TNO	52.6	0.11	18	46.6	58.5	albedo: 0.13	MPC; JPL
2021 DH_{17}	17 February 2021	Maunakea (568)	233	cubewano (hot)	46.1	0.13	11	40.0	52.3	albedo: 0.079	MPC; JPL
2021 DJ_{17}	17 February 2021	Maunakea (568)	167	res · 2:5?	55.3	0.25	25	41.5	69.2	albedo: 0.126	MPC; JPL
2021 DK_{18}	17 February 2021	Maunakea (568)	169	EDDO	861.0	0.95	15	44.6	1677.3	albedo: 0.124	MPC; JPL
2021 DL_{1}	17 February 2021	Mt. Lemmon Survey (G96)	9	damocloid	34.5	0.89	149	3.9	65.0	albedo: 0.048	MPC; JPL
2021 DM_{15}	17 February 2021	Maunakea (568)	115	cubewano (cold)	45.9	0.04	2	43.9	47.9	binary: 72 km; albedo: 0.152	MPC; JPL
2021 DM_{19}	16 February 2021	Maunakea (568)	113	SDO	83.7	0.55	28	37.4	129.9	albedo: 0.124	MPC; JPL
2021 DN_{15}	17 February 2021	Maunakea (568)	154	cubewano (cold)	44.3	0.06	3	41.8	46.9	binary: 106 km; albedo: 0.152	MPC; JPL
2021 DN_{19}	17 February 2021	Maunakea (568)	172	cubewano (cold)?	47.2	0.11	3	41.9	52.6	albedo: 0.152	MPC; JPL
2021 DO_{15}	16 February 2021	Maunakea (568)	191	other TNO	51.1	0.16	23	42.7	59.4	albedo: 0.13	MPC; JPL
2021 DP_{15}	16 February 2021	Maunakea (568)	253	SDO	61.5	0.40	4	37.1	85.9	albedo: 0.124	MPC; JPL
2021 DQ_{15}	16 February 2021	Maunakea (568)	217	res · 2:5	55.6	0.41	3	32.7	78.5	albedo: 0.126	MPC; JPL
2021 DR_{15}	17 February 2021	Maunakea (568)	716	SDO	67.7	0.43	30	38.7	96.8	albedo: 0.124	MPC; JPL
2021 DS_{15}	17 February 2021	Maunakea (568)	216	cubewano (cold)	43.7	0.05	3	41.6	45.9	binary: 138 km; albedo: 0.152	MPC; JPL
2021 EE_{44}	5 March 2021	Lowell Discovery Telescope (G37)	277	centaur	42.8	0.34	8	28.3	57.3	albedo: 0.058	MPC; JPL
2021 FQ_{54}	17 March 2021	Las Campanas Observatory (304)	97	SDO	67.9	0.44	18	37.9	98.0	albedo: 0.124	MPC; JPL
2021 GQ_{57}	9 April 2021	Pan-STARRS 1 (F51)	3	damocloid	84.0	0.96	125	3.4	164.5	albedo: 0.048	MPC; JPL
2021 GU_{122}	5 April 2021	Korea Microlensing Telescope Network-CTIO (W93)	122	SDO	60.9	0.33	12	40.9	80.9	albedo: 0.124	MPC; JPL
2021 GW_{122}	12 April 2021	Korea Microlensing Telescope Network-CTIO (W93)	100	cubewano (cold)	42.5	0.03	1	41.2	43.8	albedo: 0.152	MPC; JPL
2021 HA_{46}	—	—	—	—	47.5	0.25	17	35.6	59.3	—	MPC; JPL
2021 LA_{44}	9 June 2021	New Horizons KBO Search (266)	157	plutino	39.3	0.20	5	31.4	47.1	albedo: 0.074	MPC; JPL
2021 LA_{45}	9 June 2021	New Horizons KBO Search (266)	83	cubewano (cold)?	42.3	0.03	2	41.2	43.5	albedo: 0.152	MPC; JPL
2021 LA_{57}	—	—	—	—	60.3	0.44	20	33.9	86.7	—	MPC; JPL
2021 LA_{58}	3 June 2021	Canada-France-Hawaii Telescope, Maunakea (T14)	—	—	87.7	0.36	38	56.5	118.8	—	MPC; JPL
2021 LA_{59}	—	—	—	—	45.8	0.07	19	42.6	49.1	—	MPC; JPL
2021 LB_{44}	9 June 2021	New Horizons KBO Search (266)	61	cubewano (cold)?	42.0	0.11	3	37.4	46.7	albedo: 0.152	MPC; JPL
2021 LB_{45}	9 June 2021	New Horizons KBO Search (266)	31	twotino	47.5	0.23	9	36.3	58.6	albedo: 0.126	MPC; JPL
2021 LB_{57}	—	—	—	—	39.3	0.31	23	27.1	51.6	—	MPC; JPL
2021 LB_{58}	—	—	—	—	42.9	0.14	20	37.0	48.8	—	MPC; JPL
2021 LB_{59}	—	—	—	—	55.3	0.34	42	36.4	74.2	—	MPC; JPL
2021 LC_{44}	9 June 2021	New Horizons KBO Search (266)	66	cubewano (cold)?	46.2	0.13	2	40.2	52.2	albedo: 0.152	MPC; JPL
2021 LC_{57}	—	—	—	—	49.0	0.28	34	35.2	62.8	—	MPC; JPL
2021 LC_{58}	—	—	—	—	41.4	0.13	20	36.2	46.6	—	MPC; JPL
2021 LC_{59}	—	—	—	—	47.5	0.27	18	34.7	60.3	—	MPC; JPL
2021 LD_{44}	9 June 2021	New Horizons KBO Search (266)	111	plutino	39.2	0.30	2	27.3	51.1	albedo: 0.074	MPC; JPL
2021 LD_{56}	13 June 2021	Cerro Tololo-DECam (W84)	—	—	40.2	0.04	15	38.8	41.7	—	MPC; JPL
2021 LD_{57}	—	—	—	—	59.7	0.38	19	37.2	82.2	—	MPC; JPL
2021 LD_{58}	—	—	—	—	47.2	0.17	26	39.3	55.1	—	MPC; JPL
2021 LD_{59}	—	—	—	—	45.5	0.15	32	38.8	52.2	—	MPC; JPL
2021 LE_{44}	9 June 2021	New Horizons KBO Search (266)	71	cubewano (cold)?	44.0	0.08	3	40.5	47.6	albedo: 0.152	MPC; JPL
2021 LE_{57}	—	—	—	—	39.2	0.27	17	28.5	49.9	—	MPC; JPL
2021 LE_{58}	—	—	—	—	43.1	0.15	22	36.6	49.7	—	MPC; JPL
2021 LE_{59}	—	—	—	—	55.1	0.43	19	31.7	78.5	—	MPC; JPL
2021 LF_{44}	9 June 2021	New Horizons KBO Search (266)	48	cubewano (hot)?	41.4	0.10	18	37.3	45.6	albedo: 0.079	MPC; JPL
2021 LF_{57}	—	—	—	—	90.0	0.60	24	35.7	144.3	—	MPC; JPL
2021 LF_{58}	—	—	—	—	54.8	0.16	30	45.8	63.8	—	MPC; JPL
2021 LF_{59}	—	—	—	—	66.5	0.42	34	38.7	94.3	—	MPC; JPL
2021 LG_{44}	9 June 2021	New Horizons KBO Search (266)	37	cubewano (cold)?	43.5	0.05	1	41.3	45.7	albedo: 0.152	MPC; JPL
2021 LG_{57}	—	—	—	—	38.7	0.09	23	35.1	42.3	—	MPC; JPL
2021 LG_{58}	—	—	—	—	41.7	0.07	20	38.7	44.7	—	MPC; JPL
2021 LG_{59}	—	—	—	—	43.0	0.07	21	39.9	46.1	—	MPC; JPL
2021 LH_{44}	9 June 2021	New Horizons KBO Search (266)	52	cubewano (cold)?	43.9	0.04	2	42.2	45.6	albedo: 0.152	MPC; JPL
2021 LH_{57}	—	—	—	—	42.4	0.12	23	37.3	47.5	—	MPC; JPL
2021 LH_{58}	—	—	—	—	39.4	0.28	22	28.6	50.3	—	MPC; JPL
2021 LH_{59}	—	—	—	—	51.8	0.27	19	37.9	65.8	—	MPC; JPL
2021 LJ_{44}	9 June 2021	New Horizons KBO Search (266)	67	cubewano (cold)?	44.0	0.05	4	41.8	46.2	albedo: 0.152	MPC; JPL
2021 LJ_{57}	—	—	—	—	43.0	0.14	15	36.9	49.1	—	MPC; JPL
2021 LJ_{58}	—	—	—	—	47.1	0.15	22	40.1	54.2	—	MPC; JPL
2021 LJ_{59}	—	—	—	—	39.5	0.27	23	28.6	50.3	—	MPC; JPL
2021 LK_{44}	9 June 2021	New Horizons KBO Search (266)	76	SDO	86.0	0.57	16	36.9	135.1	albedo: 0.124	MPC; JPL
2021 LK_{54}	8 June 2021	Canada-France-Hawaii Telescope, Maunakea (T14)	79	plutino	39.3	0.22	23	30.8	47.9	albedo: 0.074	MPC; JPL
2021 LK_{57}	—	—	—	—	45.0	0.18	15	36.8	53.1	—	MPC; JPL
2021 LK_{58}	—	—	—	—	51.1	0.28	40	36.9	65.3	—	MPC; JPL
2021 LL_{37}	12 June 2021	DECam (W84)	574	SDO	55.7	0.36	10	35.8	75.5	albedo: 0.124	MPC; JPL
2021 LL_{44}	9 June 2021	New Horizons KBO Search (266)	43	cubewano (cold)?	42.5	0.01	2	42.0	43.0	albedo: 0.152	MPC; JPL
2021 LL_{54}	3 June 2021	Canada-France-Hawaii Telescope, Maunakea (T14)	90	other TNO	39.5	0.02	19	38.7	40.2	albedo: 0.13	MPC; JPL
2021 LL_{56}	—	—	—	—	45.1	0.16	26	37.8	52.5	—	MPC; JPL
2021 LL_{57}	—	—	—	—	48.7	0.28	24	35.1	62.2	—	MPC; JPL
2021 LL_{58}	—	—	—	—	83.9	0.61	17	33.0	134.8	—	MPC; JPL
2021 LM_{43}	13 June 2021	Cerro Tololo Observatory, La Serena (807)	131	SDO	88.7	0.63	15	32.9	144.5	albedo: 0.124	MPC; JPL
2021 LM_{44}	9 June 2021	New Horizons KBO Search (266)	81	cubewano (cold)?	43.7	0.09	1	39.7	47.8	albedo: 0.152	MPC; JPL
2021 LM_{56}	—	—	—	—	45.4	0.12	20	40.0	50.8	—	MPC; JPL
2021 LM_{57}	—	—	—	—	42.1	0.22	18	32.7	51.4	—	MPC; JPL
2021 LM_{58}	—	—	—	—	45.3	0.14	22	38.8	51.9	—	MPC; JPL
2021 LN_{43}	6 June 2021	Cerro Tololo Observatory, La Serena (807)	295	twotino	47.6	0.23	8	36.7	58.6	albedo: 0.126	MPC; JPL
2021 LN_{44}	9 June 2021	New Horizons KBO Search (266)	54	plutino	39.2	0.20	5	31.3	47.1	albedo: 0.074	MPC; JPL
2021 LN_{56}	—	—	—	—	59.9	0.39	30	36.7	83.2	—	MPC; JPL
2021 LN_{57}	—	—	—	—	109.8	0.74	19	28.4	191.1	—	MPC; JPL
2021 LN_{58}	—	—	—	—	104.8	0.67	27	34.2	175.4	—	MPC; JPL
2021 LO_{43}	6 June 2021	Cerro Tololo Observatory, La Serena (807)	182	SDO	63.2	0.44	15	35.6	90.8	albedo: 0.124	MPC; JPL
2021 LO_{44}	9 June 2021	New Horizons KBO Search (266)	57	plutino	39.0	0.25	19	29.4	48.7	albedo: 0.074	MPC; JPL
2021 LO_{56}	—	—	—	—	55.1	0.44	14	30.9	79.3	—	MPC; JPL
2021 LO_{57}	—	—	—	—	68.9	0.51	22	33.6	104.1	—	MPC; JPL
2021 LO_{58}	—	—	—	—	54.5	0.35	23	35.7	73.3	—	MPC; JPL
2021 LP_{43}	7 June 2021	Cerro Tololo Observatory, La Serena (807)	215	SDO	170.3	0.77	9	39.5	301.1	albedo: 0.124	MPC; JPL
2021 LP_{44}	9 June 2021	New Horizons KBO Search (266)	52	res · 2:5	55.1	0.42	5	31.7	78.4	albedo: 0.126	MPC; JPL
2021 LP_{56}	—	—	—	—	47.4	0.16	17	39.8	54.9	—	MPC; JPL
2021 LP_{57}	—	—	—	—	41.8	0.08	26	38.6	45.0	—	MPC; JPL
2021 LP_{58}	—	—	—	—	45.6	0.17	29	37.8	53.4	—	MPC; JPL
2021 LQ_{43}	6 June 2021	Cerro Tololo Observatory, La Serena (807)	224	res · 1:3	62.0	0.37	12	38.8	85.2	albedo: 0.126	MPC; JPL
2021 LQ_{44}	9 June 2021	New Horizons KBO Search (266)	249	cubewano (hot)?	47.4	0.10	21	42.9	51.9	albedo: 0.079	MPC; JPL
2021 LQ_{56}	—	—	—	—	39.3	0.26	28	29.0	49.7	—	MPC; JPL
2021 LQ_{57}	—	—	—	—	44.2	0.14	28	38.0	50.4	—	MPC; JPL
2021 LQ_{58}	—	—	—	—	77.4	0.62	18	29.3	125.4	—	MPC; JPL
2021 LR_{43}	11 June 2021	Cerro Tololo Observatory, La Serena (807)	162	SDO	76.1	0.49	33	39.0	113.2	albedo: 0.124	MPC; JPL
2021 LR_{44}	9 June 2021	New Horizons KBO Search (266)	96	plutino	39.3	0.17	7	32.5	46.1	albedo: 0.074	MPC; JPL
2021 LR_{56}	—	—	—	—	41.7	0.11	14	37.1	46.2	—	MPC; JPL
2021 LR_{57}	—	—	—	—	136.5	0.75	15	34.5	238.6	—	MPC; JPL
2021 LR_{58}	—	—	—	—	52.9	0.31	19	36.5	69.2	—	MPC; JPL
2021 LS_{43}	7 June 2021	Cerro Tololo Observatory, La Serena (807)	176	SDO	91.3	0.60	4	36.7	145.9	albedo: 0.124	MPC; JPL
2021 LS_{44}	9 June 2021	New Horizons KBO Search (266)	69	cubewano (cold)?	43.1	0.02	2	42.3	43.8	albedo: 0.152	MPC; JPL
2021 LS_{56}	—	—	—	—	38.4	0.03	24	37.1	39.7	—	MPC; JPL
2021 LS_{57}	—	—	—	—	49.9	0.27	18	36.4	63.4	—	MPC; JPL
2021 LS_{58}	—	—	—	—	77.8	0.54	28	35.6	120.0	—	MPC; JPL
2021 LT_{44}	9 June 2021	New Horizons KBO Search (266)	36	cubewano (cold)?	46.6	0.13	4	40.4	52.9	albedo: 0.152	MPC; JPL
2021 LT_{56}	—	—	—	—	43.4	0.08	20	39.8	47.0	—	MPC; JPL
2021 LT_{57}	—	—	—	—	41.7	0.12	23	36.6	46.8	—	MPC; JPL
2021 LT_{58}	—	—	—	—	39.2	0.21	18	30.8	47.6	—	MPC; JPL
2021 LU_{43}	9 June 2021	New Horizons KBO Search (266)	188	cubewano (cold)	42.6	0.02	3	41.8	43.4	albedo: 0.152	MPC; JPL
2021 LU_{56}	—	—	—	—	63.7	0.41	18	37.5	90.0	—	MPC; JPL
2021 LU_{57}	—	—	—	—	51.8	0.30	23	36.3	67.2	—	MPC; JPL
2021 LV_{43}	9 June 2021	New Horizons KBO Search (266)	37	twotino	47.2	0.30	2	32.9	61.5	albedo: 0.126	MPC; JPL
2021 LV_{44}	9 June 2021	New Horizons KBO Search (266)	54	plutino	39.3	0.18	7	32.3	46.4	albedo: 0.074	MPC; JPL
2021 LV_{56}	—	—	—	—	68.8	0.51	18	33.9	103.6	—	MPC; JPL
2021 LV_{57}	—	—	—	—	41.5	0.10	23	37.3	45.7	—	MPC; JPL
2021 LV_{58}	—	—	—	—	55.1	0.42	21	32.1	78.1	—	MPC; JPL
2021 LW_{43}	9 June 2021	New Horizons KBO Search (266)	39	SDO	61.9	0.29	24	43.7	80.0	albedo: 0.124	MPC; JPL
2021 LW_{44}	9 June 2021	New Horizons KBO Search (266)	102	cubewano (cold)?	43.8	0.07	2	40.9	46.6	albedo: 0.152	MPC; JPL
2021 LW_{56}	—	—	—	—	54.9	0.43	17	31.4	78.4	—	MPC; JPL
2021 LW_{57}	—	—	—	—	50.4	0.31	26	34.7	66.2	—	MPC; JPL
2021 LW_{58}	—	—	—	—	39.3	0.11	19	34.9	43.8	—	MPC; JPL
2021 LX_{43}	9 June 2021	New Horizons KBO Search (266)	55	cubewano (cold)?	43.2	0.02	2	42.2	44.3	albedo: 0.152	MPC; JPL
2021 LX_{44}	9 June 2021	New Horizons KBO Search (266)	198	plutino	39.4	0.14	3	34.0	44.8	albedo: 0.074	MPC; JPL
2021 LX_{56}	—	—	—	—	53.4	0.34	23	35.2	71.6	—	MPC; JPL
2021 LX_{57}	—	—	—	—	41.9	0.41	27	24.7	59.1	—	MPC; JPL
2021 LX_{58}	—	—	—	—	55.3	0.36	18	35.4	75.1	—	MPC; JPL
2021 LY_{43}	9 June 2021	New Horizons KBO Search (266)	72	cubewano (hot)?	45.7	0.13	5	40.0	51.5	albedo: 0.079	MPC; JPL
2021 LY_{44}	9 June 2021	New Horizons KBO Search (266)	75	SDO	58.3	0.39	4	35.7	80.9	albedo: 0.124	MPC; JPL
2021 LY_{56}	—	—	—	—	38.4	0.05	32	36.6	40.3	—	MPC; JPL
2021 LY_{57}	—	—	—	—	41.6	0.12	29	36.6	46.6	—	MPC; JPL
2021 LY_{58}	—	—	—	—	47.0	0.22	19	36.5	57.4	—	MPC; JPL
2021 LZ_{43}	9 June 2021	New Horizons KBO Search (266)	97	cubewano (cold)?	43.3	0.11	2	38.6	48.1	albedo: 0.152	MPC; JPL
2021 LZ_{44}	9 June 2021	New Horizons KBO Search (266)	74	cubewano (cold)?	43.6	0.04	2	42.1	45.1	albedo: 0.152	MPC; JPL
2021 LZ_{56}	—	—	—	—	40.1	0.11	16	35.6	44.6	—	MPC; JPL
2021 LZ_{57}	—	—	—	—	73.0	0.56	21	31.9	114.2	—	MPC; JPL
2021 LZ_{58}	—	—	—	—	39.2	0.27	28	28.5	49.9	—	MPC; JPL
2021 MA_{23}	17 June 2021	New Horizons KBO Search (266)	60	cubewano (cold)?	45.3	0.08	2	41.8	48.9	albedo: 0.152	MPC; JPL
2021 MW_{22}	17 June 2021	New Horizons KBO Search (266)	79	plutino	39.3	0.24	8	29.9	48.7	albedo: 0.074	MPC; JPL
2021 MX_{22}	17 June 2021	New Horizons KBO Search (266)	87	plutino	39.3	0.22	7	30.6	48.0	albedo: 0.074	MPC; JPL
2021 MY_{22}	17 June 2021	New Horizons KBO Search (266)	45	plutino	39.2	0.24	3	30.0	48.5	albedo: 0.074	MPC; JPL
2021 MZ_{22}	17 June 2021	New Horizons KBO Search (266)	55	cubewano (cold)?	44.5	0.09	4	40.5	48.5	albedo: 0.152	MPC; JPL
2021 NS_{71}	5 July 2021	New Horizons KBO Search (266)	141	unusual	38.8	0.51	8	18.9	58.8	albedo: 0.051	MPC; JPL
2021 NT_{97}	—	—	—	—	45.8	0.07	1	42.6	48.9	—	MPC; JPL
2021 NU_{97}	—	—	—	—	34.9	0.09	2	31.8	38.0	—	MPC; JPL
2021 QB_{98}	29 August 2021	Cerro Tololo Observatory, La Serena (807)	186	SDO	63.6	0.53	4	30.2	97.0	albedo: 0.124	MPC; JPL
2021 QF_{130}	—	—	—	—	48.7	0.11	53	43.5	53.9	—	MPC; JPL
2021 QF_{98}	29 August 2021	Cerro Tololo Observatory, La Serena (807)	158	centaur	33.7	0.30	18	23.8	43.7	albedo: 0.058	MPC; JPL
2021 QG_{98}	31 August 2021	Cerro Tololo Observatory, La Serena (807)	268	SDO	61.6	0.42	21	35.8	87.4	albedo: 0.124	MPC; JPL
2021 QH_{98}	29 August 2021	Cerro Tololo Observatory, La Serena (807)	159	cubewano (cold)	42.9	0.02	2	42.2	43.5	albedo: 0.152	MPC; JPL
2021 QJ_{98}	29 August 2021	Cerro Tololo Observatory, La Serena (807)	211	res · 1:6	98.0	0.58	22	41.2	154.8	albedo: 0.126	MPC; JPL
2021 QT_{128}	—	—	—	—	42.5	0.06	14	39.9	45.2	—	MPC; JPL
2021 RA_{237}	5 September 2021	DECam (W84)	55	SDO	53.7	0.36	2	34.3	73.0	albedo: 0.124	MPC; JPL
2021 RB_{237}	5 September 2021	DECam (W84)	51	cubewano (cold)	42.9	0.04	2	41.3	44.4	albedo: 0.152	MPC; JPL
2021 RC_{237}	5 September 2021	DECam (W84)	82	cubewano (cold)	45.7	0.08	1	41.9	49.5	albedo: 0.152	MPC; JPL
2021 RD_{237}	4 September 2021	DECam (W84)	111	cubewano (hot)	41.7	0.13	33	36.2	47.2	albedo: 0.079	MPC; JPL
2021 RE_{237}	5 September 2021	DECam (W84)	61	cubewano (cold)	45.5	0.12	2	40.0	51.0	albedo: 0.152	MPC; JPL
2021 RF_{237}	5 September 2021	DECam (W84)	52	cubewano (cold)	44.0	0.09	4	40.1	47.9	albedo: 0.152	MPC; JPL
2021 RG_{237}	9 September 2021	DECam (W84)	58	cubewano (cold)	43.1	0.07	2	40.0	46.1	albedo: 0.152	MPC; JPL
2021 RH_{237}	5 September 2021	DECam (W84)	66	cubewano (cold)	44.5	0.05	2	42.1	46.8	albedo: 0.152	MPC; JPL
2021 RJ_{237}	9 September 2021	DECam (W84)	52	cubewano (cold)	43.8	0.03	2	42.6	45.1	albedo: 0.152	MPC; JPL
2021 RK_{237}	5 September 2021	DECam (W84)	49	cubewano (cold)	42.9	0.06	4	40.4	45.3	albedo: 0.152	MPC; JPL
2021 RL_{237}	5 September 2021	DECam (W84)	35	SDO	81.2	0.54	14	37.0	125.4	albedo: 0.124	MPC; JPL
2021 RM_{114}	13 September 2021	Pan-STARRS 1 (F51)	2.7	damocloid	106.8	0.96	103	4.0	209.6	albedo: 0.048	MPC; JPL
2021 RM_{237}	9 September 2021	DECam (W84)	116	plutino	39.4	0.19	12	31.8	46.9	albedo: 0.074	MPC; JPL
2021 RM_{238}	9 September 2021	DECam (W84)	105	SDO	90.6	0.58	24	37.8	143.5	albedo: 0.124	MPC; JPL
2021 RN_{237}	9 September 2021	DECam (W84)	55	cubewano (cold)	45.5	0.07	3	42.3	48.7	albedo: 0.152	MPC; JPL
2021 RN_{238}	6 September 2021	DECam (W84)	66	cubewano (cold)	42.9	0.05	1	40.7	45.1	albedo: 0.152	MPC; JPL
2021 RO_{269}	—	—	—	—	44.2	0.04	2	42.6	45.8	—	MPC; JPL
2021 RP_{269}	—	—	—	—	45.6	0.12	1	40.2	51	—	MPC; JPL
2021 RQ_{269}	—	—	—	—	43.6	0.15	9	36.9	50.3	—	MPC; JPL
2021 RR205	5 September 2021	Maunakea (568)	169	EDDO	949.5	0.94	8	55.6	1843.3	albedo: 0.124	MPC; JPL
2021 RR_{237}	9 September 2021	DECam (W84)	69	cubewano (hot)	43.2	0.09	21	39.5	46.9	albedo: 0.079	MPC; JPL
2021 RR_{269}	—	—	—	—	44.3	0.01	2	44	44.6	—	MPC; JPL
2021 RS_{237}	4 September 2021	DECam (W84)	90	cubewano (cold)	43.1	0.01	1	42.5	43.6	albedo: 0.152	MPC; JPL
2021 RS_{269}	—	—	—	—	43.6	0.03	7	42.2	45	—	MPC; JPL
2021 RT_{237}	6 September 2021	DECam (W84)	117	plutino	39.5	0.13	3	34.5	44.4	albedo: 0.074	MPC; JPL
2021 RT_{269}	—	—	—	—	42.9	0.06	3	40.3	45.4	—	MPC; JPL
2021 RU_{236}	6 September 2021	DECam (W84)	93	cubewano (cold)	44.3	0.06	1	41.6	46.9	albedo: 0.152	MPC; JPL
2021 RU_{237}	6 September 2021	DECam (W84)	71	cubewano (cold)	44.4	0.07	3	41.3	47.4	albedo: 0.152	MPC; JPL
2021 RV_{209}	3 September 2021	Cerro Tololo Observatory, La Serena (807)	248	SDO	61.0	0.44	14	34.2	87.9	albedo: 0.124	MPC; JPL
2021 RV_{236}	6 September 2021	DECam (W84)	59	SDO	51.3	0.25	0	38.3	64.3	albedo: 0.124	MPC; JPL
2021 RV_{237}	9 September 2021	DECam (W84)	66	SDO	80.9	0.51	29	39.3	122.5	albedo: 0.124	MPC; JPL
2021 RW_{209}	7 September 2021	Maunakea (568)	121	SDO	76.5	0.33	42	51.5	101.6	albedo: 0.124	MPC; JPL
2021 RW_{236}	4 September 2021	DECam (W84)	118	cubewano (cold)	45.9	0.13	4	40.1	51.7	albedo: 0.152	MPC; JPL
2021 RW_{237}	7 September 2021	DECam (W84)	217	SDO	77.0	0.51	21	37.5	116.5	albedo: 0.124	MPC; JPL
2021 RX_{236}	6 September 2021	DECam (W84)	69	cubewano (cold)	44.2	0.07	1	41.1	47.2	albedo: 0.152	MPC; JPL
2021 RX_{237}	6 September 2021	DECam (W84)	79	cubewano (cold)	42.6	0.04	3	41.0	44.2	albedo: 0.152	MPC; JPL
2021 RY_{236}	5 September 2021	DECam (W84)	65	cubewano (cold)	43.0	0.02	2	42.0	44.0	albedo: 0.152	MPC; JPL
2021 RZ_{236}	7 September 2021	DECam (W84)	74	cubewano (hot)	43.5	0.09	15	39.8	47.3	albedo: 0.079	MPC; JPL
2021 TH_{165}	11 October 2021	Pan-STARRS 1 (F51)	73	other TNO	39.8	0.46	155	21.6	58.1	albedo: 0.13	MPC; JPL
2021 TH_{192}	2 October 2021	DECam (W84)	99	cubewano (cold)	42.9	0.04	2	41.3	44.5	albedo: 0.152	MPC; JPL
2021 TJ_{192}	4 October 2021	DECam (W84)	125	SDO	52.3	0.28	10	37.5	67.1	albedo: 0.124	MPC; JPL
2021 TK_{192}	6 October 2021	DECam (W84)	97	cubewano (cold)	43.9	0.05	2	41.9	46.0	albedo: 0.152	MPC; JPL
2021 TP_{191}	4 October 2021	DECam (W84)	48	cubewano (cold)?	45.8	0.08	3	42.0	49.5	albedo: 0.152	MPC; JPL
2021 UL_{19}	17 October 2021	Mt. Lemmon Survey (G96)	1	damocloid	38.3	0.95	155	1.9	74.7	albedo: 0.048	MPC; JPL
2021 XD_{7}	3 December 2021	Mt. Graham-VATT (290)	153	other TNO	48.9	0.29	12	34.5	63.2	albedo: 0.13	MPC; JPL
2021 XS_{6}	3 December 2021	Mt. Lemmon Survey (G96)	3	damocloid	39.2	0.90	97	3.9	74.4	albedo: 0.048	MPC; JPL

back to top
