= 2015 KE172 =

Trans-Neptunian object

2015 KE_{172}
Discovery
- Discovered by: OSSOS
- Discovery site: Mauna Kea Obs.
- Discovery date: 21 May 2015 (first observed only)

Designations
- Alternative designations: o5m72 (internal designation)
- Minor planet category: TNO · 1:9 distant

Orbital characteristics
- Epoch 23 March 2018 (JD 2458200.5)
- Uncertainty parameter 4
- Observation arc: 3.26 yr (1,189 d)
- Earliest precovery date: 30 May 2014
- Aphelion: 222.11 AU (33.227 Tm)
- Perihelion: 44.137 AU (6.6028 Tm)
- Semi-major axis: 133.12 AU (19.914 Tm)
- Eccentricity: 0.6685
- Orbital period (sidereal): 1536 yr (561,018 d)
- Mean anomaly: 0.1061°
- Mean motion: 0° 0^{m} 2.16^{s} / day
- Inclination: 38.280°
- Longitude of ascending node: 227.55°
- Argument of perihelion: 15.428°

Physical characteristics
- Mean diameter: 100 km (est. at 0.09)
- Geometric albedo: 0.09 (generic est.)
- Absolute magnitude (H): 8.2024

2015 KE_{172} is a distant resonant trans-Neptunian object on an eccentric orbit in the outermost region of the Solar System, approximately 100 kilometers (60 miles) in diameter. It was first observed on 21 May 2015 by astronomers with the Outer Solar System Origins Survey at the Mauna Kea Observatories on the island of Hawaii, United States. It came to perihelion (closest approach to the Sun) in October 2017 at a distance of 44.1 AU (6.60 billion km). Its existence was first released in February 2018, and the observations and orbit were announced on 27 April 2018. It belongs to the most distant resonant objects known to exist.

== Description ==
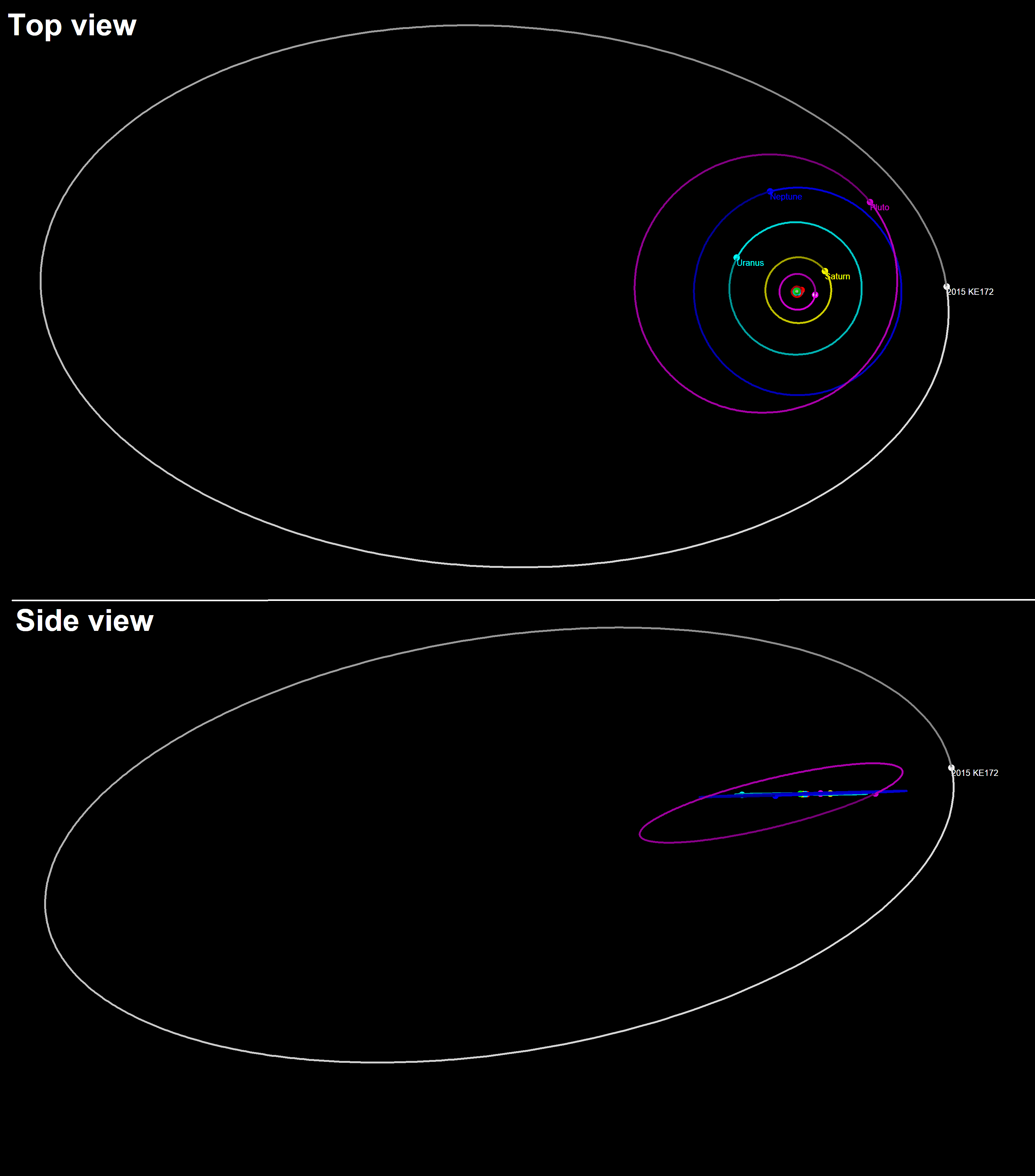
Orbital diagram of 2015 KE_{172}

2015 KE_{172} is one of two known resonant trans-Neptunian objects that stay in a distant 1:9 resonance with the ice giant Neptune. The other object is 2007 TC_{434} which was announced on 20 February 2018. They are currently the most distant resonant objects known with a secure resonant classification, and their detection allowed to estimate a 1:9-resonant population of 11 thousand objects with similar orbits and similar size. It is thought that both objects originated from the scattered disc before they became locked into a mean-motion resonance with Neptune.

Based on a generic magnitude-to-diameter conversion, the object measures 100 kilometers in diameter, for an absolute magnitude of 8.2, and an assumed albedo of 0.09, which is a typical figure seen among the diverse populations of distant objects.

It orbits the Sun at a distance of 44.1–222 AU once every 1536 years (semi-major axis of 133.1 AU). Its orbit has a high eccentricity of 0.67 and an inclination of 38° with respect to the ecliptic. As of 2025, this minor planet has not been numbered.
