= (143707) 2003 UY117 =

Trans-Neptunian object in the Kuiper belt

(143707) 2003 UY_{117}
Discovery
- Discovered by: Marc W. Buie / Deep Ecliptic Survey
- Discovery site: Kitt Peak National Observatory
- Discovery date: 21 October 2003

Designations
- Designation: (143707) 2003 UY_{117}
- Minor planet category: TNO / 2:5 resonant

Orbital characteristics
- Epoch 2026-Sep-11 (JD 2460564.5)
- Aphelion: 68.790 AU
- Perihelion: 32.551 AU
- Semi-major axis: 50.670 AU
- Eccentricity: 0.3576
- Orbital period (sidereal): 360.71 yr (131,750 d)
- Mean anomaly: 341.214°
- Inclination: 12.162°
- Longitude of ascending node: 10.749°
- Argument of perihelion: 312.428°

Physical characteristics
- Dimensions: 228 ± 21 km
- Synodic rotation period: 12.376 h
- Absolute magnitude (H): 5.97 ± 0.07

(143707) 2003 UY_{117} is a trans-Neptunian object located in the outermost regions of the Solar System. It measures approximately 228 kilometers in diameter. Discovered on 21 October 2003, by astronomer Marc W. Buie during the Deep Ecliptic Survey at the Kitt Peak National Observatory, it orbits the Sun in a 2:5 orbital resonance with Neptune.

== Orbit and classification ==
2003 UY_{117} orbits the Sun at a distance of 32.6–68.8 AU once every 360 years and 9 months (131,750 days). Its orbit has a relatively high eccentricity of 0.36 and an inclination of 12.2° relative to the ecliptic.

It is classified as a resonant trans-Neptunian object, maintaining a 2:5 orbital resonance with the planet Neptune. For every two orbits Neptune completes around the Sun, 2003 UY_{117} completes exactly five. This stable resonance prevents gravitational disruptions from Neptune despite a perihelion that brings it close to Neptune's orbit.

== Physical characteristics ==
Prior to 2024, knowledge of 2003 UY_{117} was limited to absolute magnitude estimates. A stellar occultation campaign tracked the shadow cast by the object against a magnitude 14.6 background star. Four positive chords captured across multi-station observatories allowed astronomers to map its profile.

The occultation data derived an instantaneous projected elliptical profile with dimensions of 282 ± 18 km by 184 ± 32 km, establishing an area-equivalent diameter of 228 ± 21 km. Photometric follow-ups revealed a double-peaked rotational light curve with a period of 12.376 ± 0.0033 hours and a peak-to-valley amplitude variation of 0.36 ± 0.13 mag.
