= (48639) 1995 TL8 =

Trans-Neptunian binary

(48639) 1995 TL_{8}
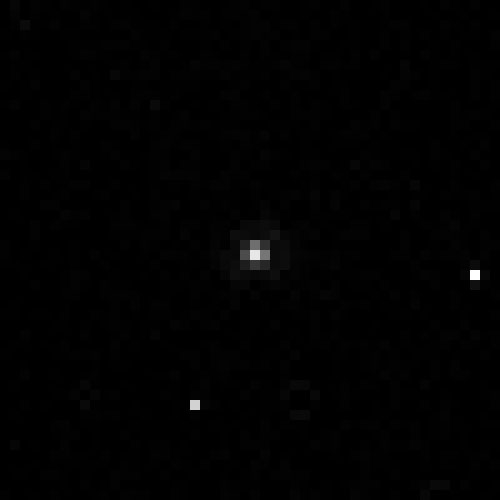
- 1995 TL_{8} and its satellite (unresolved) imaged by the Hubble Space Telescope

Discovery
- Discovered by: A. Gleason (Spacewatch)
- Discovery site: Kitt Peak National Obs.
- Discovery date: 15 October 1995

Designations
- Minor planet category: TNO · Other TNO detached · distant

Orbital characteristics
- Epoch 17 December 2020 (JD 2459200.5)
- Uncertainty parameter 2
- Observation arc: 25.26 yr (9,225 days)
- Aphelion: 65.218 AU
- Perihelion: 39.937 AU
- Semi-major axis: 52.578 AU
- Eccentricity: 0.2404
- Orbital period (sidereal): 381.25 yr (139,251 days)
- Mean anomaly: 46.972°
- Mean motion: 0° 0^{m} 9.36^{s} / day
- Inclination: 0.2499°
- Longitude of ascending node: 260.007°
- Argument of perihelion: 84.397°
- Known satellites: 1 (D: 80 km)

Physical characteristics
- Dimensions: 176 km 420.27 km (calculated); 495 km (estimated)
- Geometric albedo: 0.07 (estimated); 0.10 (assumed); 0.369
- Temperature: 42.6 K (perihelion)
- Spectral type: Spectrally prominent organics, organics-type ("Cliff type TNO"); RR · C (assumed)
- Absolute magnitude (H): 4.667±0.091 (R) · 4.8 · 5.1 · 5.290±0.060 (Note: Lellouch (2013): observations on 11 February 2011 gave an absolute magnitude of 5.290±0.060. Summary figures for (48639) at LCDB not found at ADS (2013A&A...557...60L))

(48639) 1995 TL_{8} is a binary trans-Neptunian object from the scattered disc in the outermost regions of the Solar System. It was discovered by Arianna Gleason in 1995 and measures approximately 176 kilometers in diameter. Its 80-kilometer minor-planet moon was discovered on 9 November 2002.

== Discovery ==
1995 TL_{8} was discovered on 15 October 1995, by American astronomer Arianna Gleason as part of UA's Spacewatch survey at Kitt Peak National Observatory, near Tucson, Arizona.

It was the first of the bodies presently classified as a scattered-disc object (SDO) to be discovered, preceding the SDO prototype (15874) 1996 TL66 by almost a year.

== Satellite ==
Animation of two Hubble images of 1995 TL_{8}'s satellite in August 2001

Comparison of mean separation distances and diameters of trans-Neptunian close binaries, including 1995 TL_{8}

A companion was discovered by Denise C. Stephens and Keith S. Noll, from observations with the Hubble Space Telescope taken on 9 November 2002, and announced on 5 October 2005. The satellite is relatively large, having a likely mass of about 10% of the primary. Its orbit has not been determined, but it was at a separation of only about 420 kilometres (260 mi) to the primary at the time of discovery, with a possible orbital period of about half a day and an estimated diameter of 161 kilometres (100 mi).

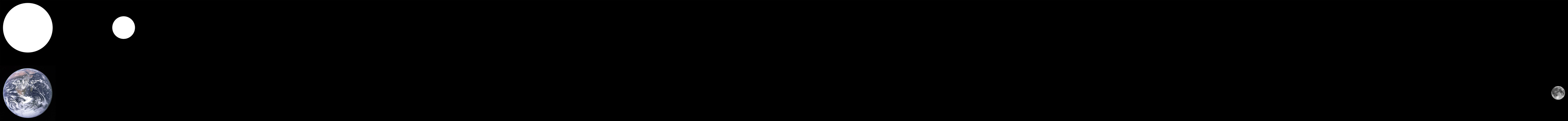
A relative size and distance comparison of the 1995 TL_{8} system with the Earth–Moon system. The scale of the Earth–Moon system has been reduced so Earth appears the same size as the 1995 TL_{8} primary.

== Scattered–extended object ==
1995 TL_{8} is classified as detached object (scattered–extended) by the Deep Ecliptic Survey, since its orbit appears to be beyond significant gravitational interactions with Neptune's current orbit. However, if Neptune migrated outward, there would have been a period when Neptune had a higher eccentricity.

Simulations made in 2007 show that 1995 TL_{8} appears to have less than a 1% chance of being in a 3:7 resonance with Neptune, but it does execute circulations near this resonance.

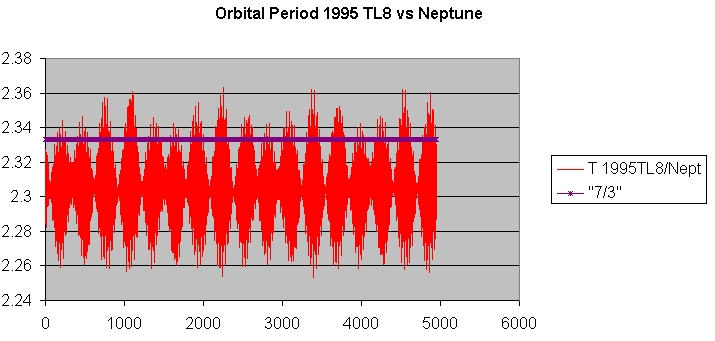
Left: The near 3:7 resonance pattern of 1995 TL_{8} with Neptune only moves clockwise. It never halts and reverses course (i.e. librates).
Right: The orbital period of 1995 TL_{8} missing the 7:3 (2.333) resonance of Neptune

== Numbering and naming ==
This minor planet was numbered by the Minor Planet Center on 20 November 2002. As of 2025, it has not been named.

== See also ==
- 3753 Cruithne (orbital circulations due to near resonant perturbations with Earth)
- Resonant trans-Neptunian object – to see examples of objects with a proper 3:7 resonance with Neptune
