= (118378) 1999 HT11 =

Trans-Neptunian object

(118378) 1999 HT_{11}
Discovery
- Discovered by: Kitt Peak National Obs.
- Discovery site: Kitt Peak National Obs.
- Discovery date: 17 April 1999

Designations
- Minor planet category: TNO · res (4:7)

Orbital characteristics
- Epoch 1 July 2021 (JD 2459396.5)
- Uncertainty parameter 3
- Observation arc: 20.78 yr (7,589 d)
- Aphelion: 49.001 AU
- Perihelion: 38.734 AU
- Semi-major axis: 43.868 AU
- Eccentricity: 0.1170
- Orbital period (sidereal): 290.55 yr (106,124 d)
- Mean anomaly: 328.33°
- Mean motion: 0° 0^{m} 12.24^{s} / day
- Inclination: 5.0489°
- Longitude of ascending node: 87.954°
- Argument of perihelion: 189.27°

Physical characteristics
- Mean diameter: 134 km (est. at 0.09)
- Spectral type: RR (very red); B–V = 1.150±0.064; V–R = 0.670±0.040; B–R = 1.820±0.050
- Apparent magnitude: 23.42
- Absolute magnitude (H): 7.6

(118378) 1999 HT_{11} is a trans-Neptunian object from the outermost region of the Solar System, locked in a 4:7 orbital resonance with Neptune. It was discovered on 17 April 1999, by astronomers at the Kitt Peak Observatory, Arizona, in the United States. The very red object measures approximately 134 kilometers (83 miles) in diameter.

== Discovery ==
1999 HT_{11} was first observed on the night of 17 April 1999, by astronomers using the 4-meter Nicholas U. Mayall Telescope at Kitt Peak National Observatory in Arizona. Five additional objects were discovered on the same weekend: 1999 HR_{11}, 1999 HS_{11}, 1999 HU_{11} (Deucalion), 1999 HV_{11} and 1999 HW_{11}. The observing astronomers were Robert Millis, James Elliot, Matthew Holman, Mark Wagner as well as Kim Falinski. Follow-up observations with the Nordic Optical Telescope at the Roque de los Muchachos Observatory, La Palma, Spain, were made three weeks later. The body's observation arc begins with its official discovery observation at Kitt Peak on 17 April 1999.

== Orbit and classification ==
This minor planet orbits the Sun at a distance of 38.7–49.0 AU once every 290 years and 7 months (106,124 days; semi-major axis of 43.87 AU). Its orbit has an eccentricity of 0.12 and an inclination of 5° with respect to the ecliptic. As of 2021, it is at 39.7 AU from the Sun with an apparent magnitude of 23.42, and will come to perihelion in 2047.

1999 HT_{11} is a resonant trans-Neptunian object that stays in a 4:7 mean-motion orbital resonance with Neptune, orbiting exactly four times the Sun for every seven orbits Neptune does and are therefore protected from the planets scattering effect. The classification is deemed secure. The 4:7 resonance is located in the midst of the classical objects of the Kuiper belt, a circumstellar disc of otherwise non-resonant bodies, contrary to the more prominent resonant plutinos (2:3) and twotinos (1:2) which form the inner and outer rim of the Kuiper belt, respectively.

== Numbering and naming ==
This minor planet was numbered by the Minor Planet Center on 16 November 2005, receiving the number 118378 in the minor planet catalog (M.P.C. 55526). As of 2025, it has not been named. According to the established naming conventions, it will be given a mythological name associated with the underworld or with creation.

== Physical characteristics ==
1999 HT_{11} has a very red surface color (RR) in the visible part of the spectrum, with B−V and V–R color indices of 1.150±0.064 and 0.670±0.040, respectively, for a combined B−R magnitude of 1.820±0.050. A red surface color is typically associated with the presence of tholins, polymer-like organic compounds, formed by long exposures to solar and cosmic radiation.

Based on a generic magnitude-to-diameter conversion, 1999 HT_{11} measures approximately 134 kilometers (83 miles) in diameter, for an assumed albedo of 0.9 and a magnitude of 7.6. According to Mike Brown, who estimates a mean-diameter of 137 km (85 mi), the object is too small for being considered a dwarf planet candidate ("probably not"). As of 2021, no rotational lightcurve for this body has been obtained from photometric observations. Its rotation period, pole and shape remain unknown.
