= (55638) 2002 VE95 =

Trans-Neptunian object (TNO)

(55638) 2002 VE_{95}
- 2002 VE_{95}'s orbit (blue) with the outer planets' orbits (red).

Discovery
- Discovered by: NEAT
- Discovery site: Palomar Obs.
- Discovery date: 14 November 2002

Designations
- Minor planet category: TNO · plutino

Orbital characteristics
- Epoch 5 May 2025 (JD 2460800.5)
- Uncertainty parameter 2 · 0
- Observation arc: 33.33 yr (12,175 d)
- Earliest precovery date: 12 October 1990
- Aphelion: 51.242 AU
- Perihelion: 28.023 AU
- Semi-major axis: 39.633 AU
- Eccentricity: 0.2929
- Orbital period (sidereal): 249.51 yr (91,134 d)
- Mean anomaly: 33.584°
- Mean motion: 0° 0^{m} 14.4^{s} / day
- Inclination: 16.324°
- Longitude of ascending node: 199.71°
- Time of perihelion: 29 June 2001
- Argument of perihelion: 207.89°

Physical characteristics
- Mean diameter: 249.8+13.5 −13.1 km
- Synodic rotation period: 6.76 h (ambiguous)
- Geometric albedo: 0.149
- Spectral type: RR (very red); B–V = 1.080±0.030; V–R = 0.710±0.020; V–I = 1.480±0.130; B–R = 1.800±0.040
- Apparent magnitude: 20.64
- Absolute magnitude (H): 5.3; 5.70±0.06

(55638) 2002 VE_{95} is a trans-Neptunian object from the outermost region of the Solar System. It was discovered on 14 November 2002, by astronomers with the Near-Earth Asteroid Tracking program at the Palomar Observatory in California, United States. This resonant trans-Neptunian object is a member of the plutino population, locked in a 2:3 resonance with Neptune. The object is likely of primordial origin with a heterogeneous surface and a notably reddish color (RR) attributed to the presence of methanol and tholins. It has a poorly defined rotation period of 6.8 hours and measures approximately 250 kilometers (160 miles) in diameter.

== Orbit and classification ==
2002 VE_{95} belongs to the plutino population, named after its largest member, Pluto. Plutinos are resonant trans-Neptunian objects, that are locked in a stable 2:3 mean-motion resonance with Neptune, orbiting the Sun twice for every three orbits Neptune does. They form a significantly large part of the inner Kuiper belt, as hundreds of these objects have already been discovered.

This minor planet orbits the Sun at a distance of 27.9–50.4 AU once every 245 years and 3 months (89,562 days; semi-major axis of 39.18 AU). Its orbit has an eccentricity of 0.29 and an inclination of 16° with respect to the ecliptic. On 29 June 2001, it came to perihelion and has since been moving away from the Sun. Due to precovery images recovered from the Digitized Sky Survey, the body's observation arc begins already in October 1990, or 12 years prior to its official discovery observation by astronomers with the Near-Earth Asteroid Tracking at Palomar.

== Numbering and naming ==
2002 VE_{95} was numbered (55638) by the Minor Planet Center on 16 February 2003 (M.P.C. 47763). As of 2025, it has not been named. According to the established naming conventions for plutinos, it will be named after a mythological figure from the underworld.

== Physical characteristics ==
=== Rotation period ===
The rotation period of 2002 VE_{95} is poorly defined and has ambiguous results with multiple alternative period solutions between 4.90 and 10 hours. In December 2002, a rotational lightcurve of this object was obtained from photometric observations by astronomers from the Sierra Nevada Observatory in Spain. Lightcurve analysis gave a poorly defined period of 6.76±0.01 hours with a brightness variation of 0.08±0.04 magnitude (U=1+). Two years later in December 2004, it was revisited by the same astronomers, obtaining another poorly defined period of 9.97±0.05 hours with an amplitude of 0.05±0.01 magnitude (U=1+). Other observations by Sheppard only determined an amplitude of less than 0.06 magnitude (U=1).

=== Diameter and albedo ===
In 2010, observations with the Herschel Space Telescope, using its PACS instrument to measure the object's thermal radiation, gave a mean diameter of 249.8+13.5
−13.1 km with a relatively high albedo of 0.149+0.019
−0.016 for an absolute magnitude of 5.70±0.06. In addition, an occultation on 3 December 2015, gave a best-fit ellipse dimension of (250.0 km × 250.0 km) with an poor quality rating of 1. These timed observations are taken when the asteroid passes in front of a distant star. The Collaborative Asteroid Lightcurve Link assumes a more regular albedo for a distant object of 0.10 and hence estimates a larger diameter of 297 kilometers.

=== Color and composition ===
In the visible light, 2002 VE_{95} has a featureless reflectance spectrum. It is very red in color (RR), with a color index of 1.080 and 0.71, in the B–V and V−R passband filters, respectively.

The near-infrared spectrum of 2002 VE_{95} is flat with two distinct absorption bands of water ice at 1.5 and 2.0 μm. There is the third feature near 2.3 μm of unclear origin. The spectral behavior of this object is similar to 5145 Pholus, a centaur. Observations with the Very Large Telescope revealed that 2002 VE_{95} has a heterogeneous surface—the amount of different ices and non-ice components depends on the observed area. Among the probable surface materials are water ice (4–19%), methanol ice (10–12%), and various tholins, photochemically altered organic compounds, also found on Triton and Titan. The redder areas are generally associated with the presence of methanol ice. The surface of 2002 VE_{95} appears to be primordial in origin.
