= (119979) 2002 WC19 =

Trans-Neptunian object

(119979) 2002 WC_{19}
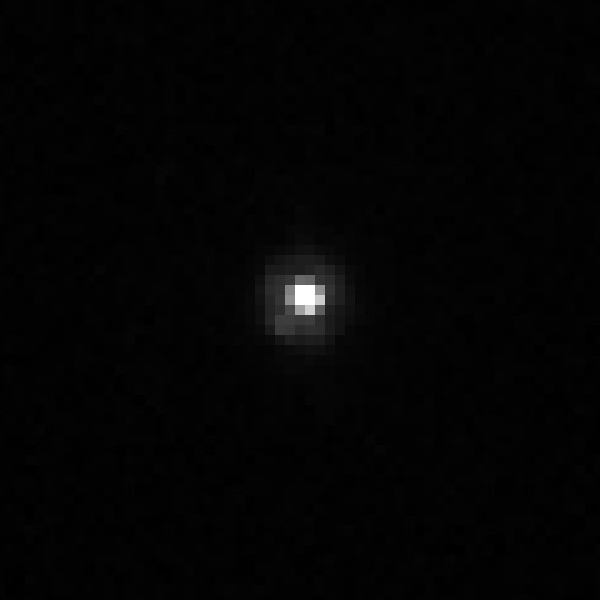
- 2002 WC_{19} and its satellite imaged by the Hubble Space Telescope in 2006

Discovery
- Discovered by: Palomar Observatory
- Discovery date: 16 November 2002

Designations
- Minor planet category: twotino · binary

Orbital characteristics
- Epoch 13 January 2016 (JD 2457400.5)
- Uncertainty parameter 3
- Observation arc: 3978 days (10.89 yr)
- Aphelion: 60.732 AU (9.0854 Tm)
- Perihelion: 35.289 AU (5.2792 Tm)
- Semi-major axis: 48.010 AU (7.1822 Tm)
- Eccentricity: 0.26498
- Orbital period (sidereal): 332.67 yr (121,507 d)
- Mean anomaly: 316.02°
- Mean motion: 0° 0^{m} 10.666^{s} / day
- Inclination: 9.1746°
- Longitude of ascending node: 109.7547°
- Time of perihelion: ≈ 5 November 2056 ±3 days
- Argument of perihelion: 44.356°
- Known satellites: 1 (81 km)
- Earth MOID: 34.3056 AU (5.13204 Tm)
- Jupiter MOID: 29.9229 AU (4.47640 Tm)

Physical characteristics
- Dimensions: 338±44 km
- Mass: (8.13±1.0)×10^{19} kg (prograde) or (7.263±0.87)×10^{19} kg (retrograde)
- Mean density: 1.97±1.00 g/cm^{3} for the average of prograde and retrograde masses (2.08±1.06 g/cm^{3} if prograde, 1.86±0.94 g/cm^{3} if retrograde)
- Geometric albedo: 0.05
- Absolute magnitude (H): 4.66

(119979) 2002 WC_{19} is a twotino, that is, a trans-Neptunian object in a 1:2 orbital resonance with Neptune. It was discovered on November 16, 2002, at the Palomar Observatory. Its estimated diameter predicts a density comparable to that of Pluto, which would be unusual as it is much smaller than the expected size at which a Kuiper belt object would normally becomes solid. However, the error bar for the density is 50%, consistent with the density of water ice to within one sigma.

Knowing how many twotinos there are may reveal whether Neptune took roughly 1 million or 10 million years to migrate about 7 AU from its birth location.

== Satellite ==
Satellite
Discovery
- Discovered by: K. S. Noll, W. M. Grundy, S. D. Kern, H. F. Levison, D. C. Stephens
- Discovery site: Hubble Space Telescope
- Discovery date: 5 November 2006

Orbital characteristics
- Semi-major axis: 4092±94 km
- Eccentricity: 0.21±0.05
- Orbital period (sidereal): 8.403±0.001 d
- Inclination: 24.0°±0.7°
- Satellite of: (119979) 2002 WC_{19}

Physical characteristics
- Mean diameter: 81 km (assuming similar albedo)
- Apparent magnitude: primary + 2.5

On February 27, 2007, a natural satellite was reported to be orbiting 2002 WC_{19}. It is estimated to be 4092±94 km from the primary, with an orbital period of 8.403±0.001 days, an eccentricity of 0.21±0.05 and an inclination of 24.0°±0.7°. Assuming similar albedos, it is a quarter the diameter of its primary, or around 81 kilometres (50 mi) in diameter.

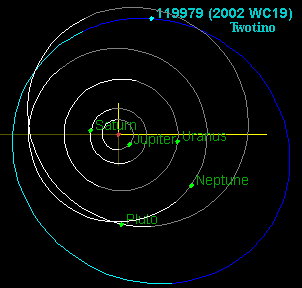
Orbit of 2002 WC_{19} compared to Pluto and Neptune

1:2 libration over 20,000 years – Neptune is held stationary (dot at 5 o'clock); orbit of Uranus in blue
