= (392741) 2012 SQ31 =

Main-belt asteroid

(392741) 2012 SQ_{31}
Discovery
- Discovered by: Spacewatch
- Discovery site: Kitt Peak National Obs.
- Discovery date: 11 August 2004 / 27 December 2009

Designations
- Alternative designations: 2004 PR_{107} · 2009 YS_{20}
- Minor planet category: main-belt · (inner); Flora

Orbital characteristics
- Epoch 23 March 2018 (JD 2458200.5)
- Uncertainty parameter 0
- Observation arc: 14.22 yr (5,193 d)
- Aphelion: 2.5806 AU
- Perihelion: 1.9412 AU
- Semi-major axis: 2.2609 AU
- Eccentricity: 0.1414
- Orbital period (sidereal): 3.40 yr (1,242 d)
- Mean anomaly: 208.16°
- Mean motion: 0° 17^{m} 23.64^{s} / day
- Inclination: 3.8552°
- Longitude of ascending node: 77.991°
- Argument of perihelion: 317.17°

Physical characteristics
- Mean diameter: 0.69 km (est. at 0.24)
- Geometric albedo: 0.24 (assumed)
- Absolute magnitude (H): 18.0

(392741) 2012 SQ_{31} is a sub-kilometer Florian asteroid from the inner regions of the asteroid belt, approximately 700 meters (2,300 feet) in diameter. It was originally considered a trans-Neptunian object and lost minor planet during 2004–2012. The date of the official discovery was later set to 27 December 2009, and credited to astronomers of the Spacewatch program conducted at the Kitt Peak National Observatory near Tucson, Arizona, in the United States.

== Orbit and classification ==
2012 SQ_{31} is a member of the Flora family (402), a giant asteroid family and the largest family of stony asteroids in the main-belt. It orbits the Sun in the inner asteroid belt at a distance of 1.9–2.6 AU once every 3 years and 5 months (1,242 days; semi-major axis of 2.26 AU). Its orbit has an eccentricity of 0.14 and an inclination of 4° with respect to the ecliptic. The body's observation arc begins with a precovery taken at Haleakala-AMOS, Hawaii, in December 2005, four years prior to its official discovery observation.

=== Trans-Neptunian object ===
On 11 August 2004, the asteroid was already observed as 2004 PR_{107} by astronomers at the Cerro Tololo Inter-American Observatory in Chile, but became a lost minor planet until 2012 due to a lack of follow-up observations. During this time, and with only two observations taken on the same day, it was thought to be a trans-Neptunian object with a semi-major axis of 46 AU. Michael Brown listed it as a likely dwarf planet on his website with an estimated diameter of 555 kilometers based on an absolute magnitude of 4.6 and an assumed albedo of 0.09.

In 2009, the lost asteroid was observed again as 2009 YS_{20}, but was not identified at the time as being related to 2004 PR_{107}. In 2012, it was finally rediscovered under its principal designation, reclassified as a small main-belt asteroid, and numbered two years later (see below).

== Physical characteristics ==
2012 SQ_{31} has been characterized as a member of the Flora family, which are stony S-type asteroids with albedo typically around 0.24, corresponding to that of the family's parent body, 8 Flora. Based on a generic magnitude-to-diameter conversion, 2012 SQ_{31} measures 690 meters for an absolute magnitude of 18.0 and an assumed albedo of 0.24. As of 2018, no rotational lightcurve has been obtained from photometric observations. The asteroid's rotation period, poles and shape remain unknown.

== Numbering and naming ==
This minor planet was numbered by the Minor Planet Center on 15 April 2014 (M.P.C. 87941). As of 2018, it has not been named.

== See also ==
- 2010 GZ60 – main-belt asteroid originally misidentified as a near-Earth object
- 2006 HH123 – misidentified nonexistent minor planet
