= 2020 VN40 =

1:10 resonant trans-Neptunian object

2020 VN_{40}
Discovery
- Discovery site: Canada–France–Hawaii Telescope (CFHT) on Maunakea
- Discovery date: August 2020

Orbital characteristics
- Epoch 5 May 2025 (JD 2460800.5)
- Uncertainty parameter 2
- Observation arc: 6.36 yr
- Earliest precovery date: 2017-09-22
- Aphelion: 241.7 AU (barycentric); 250.93 (heliocentric)
- Perihelion: 38.26 AU
- Semi-major axis: 139.95±0.05 AU (barycentric); 144.61 AU (heliocentric)
- Eccentricity: 0.73521
- Orbital period (sidereal): 1655 yr (barycentric); 1740 yr (heliocentric)
- Mean anomaly: 355.75°
- Inclination: 33.374°
- Longitude of ascending node: 197.25°
- Time of perihelion: December 2045
- Argument of perihelion: 262.67°
- Neptune MOID: 17.79 AU

Physical characteristics
- Mean diameter: ≈ 90 km (assuming albedo of 0.09); 73 km?
- Absolute magnitude (H): 8.56±0.23

2020 VN_{40} is a resonant trans-Neptunian object on a highly inclined and eccentric orbit in the scattered disc region of the Solar System. It was originally discovered in 2020 and first reported in 2025. It orbits in a 1:10 orbital resonance with Neptune, where it completes exactly one orbit for every ten orbits by Neptune. It orbits the Sun at an average distance of 139.95±0.05 AU, and takes 1,655 years (604,400 d) to orbit the Sun. The orbital resonance should be stable for tens of millions of years.
