= Resonant trans-Neptunian object =

Trans-Neptunian object in a mean-motion orbital resonance with Neptune

In astronomy, a resonant trans-Neptunian object is a trans-Neptunian object (TNO) in mean-motion orbital resonance with Neptune. The orbital periods of the resonant objects are in a simple integer relations with the period of Neptune, e.g. 1:2, 2:3, etc. Resonant TNOs can be either part of the main Kuiper belt population, or the more distant scattered disc population.

== Distribution ==
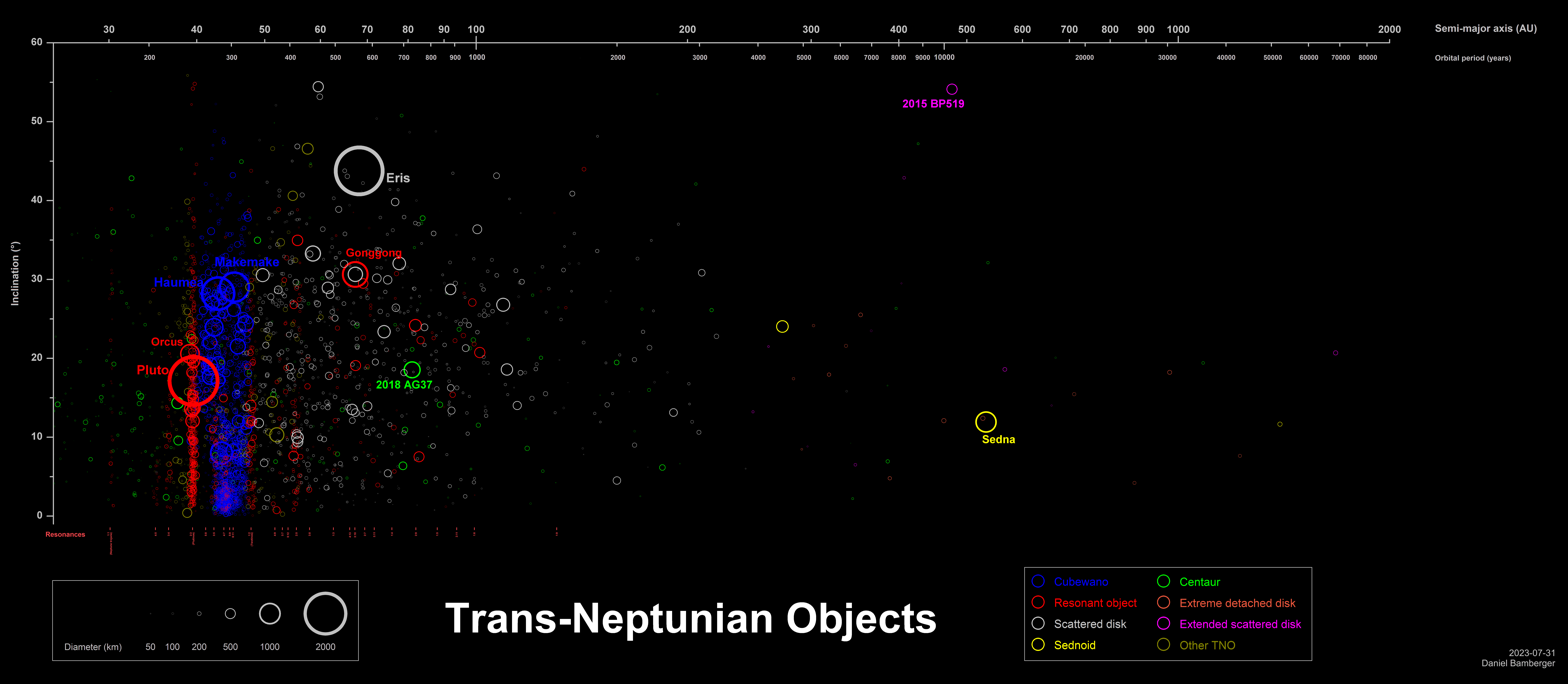
Distribution of trans-Neptunian objects. Objects occupying the stronger resonances are in red.

The diagram illustrates the distribution of the known trans-Neptunian objects. Resonant objects are plotted in red. Orbital resonances with Neptune are marked with vertical bars: 1:1 marks the position of Neptune's orbit and its trojans; 2:3 marks the orbit of Pluto and plutinos; and 1:2, 2:5, etc. mark a number of smaller families. The designations "2:3" and "3:2" both refer to the same resonance in the context of TNOs. There is no ambiguity, since by definition TNOs have periods longer than Neptune's. The order used depends on the author and research field.

== Origin ==
Detailed analytical and numerical studies of Neptune's resonances have shown that the objects must have a relatively precise range of energies. If the object's semi-major axis is outside these narrow ranges, the orbit becomes chaotic, with widely changing orbital elements. As TNOs were discovered, more than 10% were found to be in 2:3 resonances, far from a random distribution. It is now believed that the objects have been collected from wider distances by sweeping resonances during the migration of Neptune. Well before the discovery of the first TNO, it was suggested that interaction between giant planets and a massive disk of small particles would, via angular-momentum transfer, make Jupiter migrate inwards and make Saturn, Uranus, and especially Neptune migrate outwards. During this relatively short period of time, Neptune's resonances would be sweeping the space, trapping objects on initially varying heliocentric orbits into resonance.

== Known populations ==
=== 1:1 resonance (Neptune trojans, period 164.7 years) ===
A few objects have been discovered following orbits with semi-major axes similar to that of Neptune, near the Sun–Neptune Lagrangian points. These Neptune trojans, termed by analogy to the (Jupiter) trojan asteroids, are in 1:1 resonance with Neptune. 31 are known as of February 2024. Only 3 objects are near Neptune's L_{5} Lagrangian point, and the identification of one of these is insecure; the others are located in Neptune's L_{4} region. In addition, (316179) 2010 EN65 is a so-called "jumping trojan", currently transitioning from librating around L_{4} to librating around L_{5}, via the L_{3} region.

Leading Trojans at L_{4}

- 385571 Otrera
- 385695 Clete
- (527604) 2007 VL305
- (530664) 2011 SO277
- (530930) 2011 WG157
- (612243) 2001 QR322
- (613490) 2006 RJ103
- (666739) 2010 TS191
- 2005 TN53
- 2010 TT191
- 2012 UV177
- 2012 UD185
- 2013 RL124
- 2013 RC158
- 2013 TZ187
- 2013 TK227
- 2013 VX30
- 2014 QO441
- 2014 QP441
- 2014 RO74
- 2014 SC374
- 2014 UU240
- 2014 YB92
- 2015 RW277
- 2015 VV165
- 2015 VW165
- 2015 VX165
- 2015 VU207

Following Trojans at L_{5}

- 2008 LC18
- 2011 HM102
- 2013 KY18

=== 2:3 resonance ("plutinos", period 247.0 years) ===
The motions of Orcus (in grey) and Pluto (in red) in a rotating frame with a period equal to Neptune's orbital period (holding Neptune stationary)

Pluto and its moons (top) compared in size, albedo, and colour with Orcus, Achlys (2003 AZ_{84}), and Ixion

The 2:3 resonance at 39.4 AU is by far the dominant category among the resonant objects. As of February 2020, it includes 383 confirmed and 99 possible member bodies (such as (175113) 2004 PF115). Of these 383 confirmed plutinos, 338 have their orbits secured in simulations run by the Deep Ecliptic Survey. The objects following orbits in this resonance are named plutinos after Pluto, the first such body discovered. Large, numbered plutinos include:

- Pluto
- 90482 Orcus
- 208996 Achlys
- (455502) 2003 UZ413
- (84922) 2003 VS2
- 28978 Ixion
- (84719) 2002 VR128
- (469372) 2001 QF298
- 38628 Huya
- (33340) 1998 VG44
- (15789) 1993 SC
- (444745) 2007 JF43
- (532092) 2013 HU156
- (523760) 2014 WQ509
- (523768) 2014 WQ510
- (469421) 2001 XD255
- (533209) 2014 DR143
- (523655) 2011 VJ24
- (120216) 2004 EW95
- (523715) 2014 KU101
- 47171 Lempo
- (523644) 2010 VX11
- (524216) 2001 RU143
- (525258) 2004 VT75
- (531077) 2012 DB99
- (504555) 2008 SO266
- (307463) 2002 VU130
- (55638) 2002 VE95
- (524460) 2002 GF32
- (523717) 2014 KY101
- (450265) 2003 WU172
- (535029) 2014 WG510
- (385445) 2003 QH91
- (469987) 2006 HJ123
- (523697) 2014 GY53
- (523618) 2007 RT15
- (535231) 2014 YJ50
- (508823) 2001 RX143
- (469506) 2003 FF128
- (523766) 2014 WF510
- (529938) 2010 TM182
- (133067) 2003 FB128
- (523751) 2014 UU224
- (306792) 2001 KQ77
- (469704) 2005 EZ296

=== 3:5 resonance (period 274.5 years) ===
As of February 2020, 47 objects are confirmed to be in a 3:5 orbital resonance with Neptune at 42.2 AU. Among the numbered objects there are:

- (15809) 1994 JS
- (126154) 2001 YH140
- (143751) 2003 US292
- (149349) 2002 VA131
- (434709) 2006 CJ69
- (469420) 2001 XP254
- (469584) 2003 YW179
- (470523) 2008 CS190
- (503883) 2001 QF331
- (523677) 2013 UF15
- (523688) 2014 DK143
- (523731) 2014 OK394
- (523743) 2014 TA86
- (530839) 2011 UK411
- (531683) 2012 UC178
- (534074) 2014 QZ441
- (534314) 2014 SJ349

=== 4:7 resonance (period 288.2 years) ===
Another population of objects is orbiting the Sun at 43.6 AU (in the midst of the classical objects). The objects are rather small (with two exceptions, H>6) and most of them follow orbits close to the ecliptic. As of February 2020, 55 objects in 4:7 resonance have had their orbits secured by the Deep Ecliptic Survey. Objects with well established orbits include:

- (60620) 2000 FD8
- (118378) 1999 HT11
- (118698) 2000 OY51
- (119066) 2001 KJ76
- (119070) 2001 KP77
- (119956) 2002 PA149
- (129772) 1999 HR11
- (135024) 2001 KO76
- (135742) 2002 PB171
- (181871) 1999 CO153
- 385446 Manwë
- (385527) 2004 OK14
- (500828) 2013 GR136
- (523742) 2014 TZ85
- (525816) 2005 SF278
- (531917) 2013 BN82
- (532039) 2013 FR28
- (533028) 2014 AL55

=== 1:2 resonance ("twotinos", period 329.4 years) ===
This resonance at 47.7 AU is often considered to be the outer edge of the Kuiper belt, and the objects in this resonance are sometimes referred to as twotinos. Twotinos have inclinations less than 15 degrees and generally moderate eccentricities between 0.1 and 0.3 . An unknown number of the 2:1 resonants likely did not originate in a planetesimal disk that was swept by the resonance during Neptune's migration, but were captured when they had already been scattered.

There are far fewer objects in this resonance than plutinos. Johnston's Archive counts 111 while simulations by the Deep Ecliptic Survey have confirmed 126 as of February 2020. Long-term orbital integration shows that the 1:2 resonance is less stable than the 2:3 resonance: Only 15% of the objects in 1:2 resonance were found to survive 4 Gyr as compared with 28% of the plutinos. Consequently, it might be that twotinos were originally as numerous as plutinos, but their population has dropped significantly below that of plutinos since.

Objects with well established orbits include (in order of the diameter):

- (119979) 2002 WC19
- (612931) 2005 CA79
- (312645) 2010 EP65
- (576256) 2012 JH67
- (523617) 2007 PS45
- (523691) 2014 DO143
- (308379) 2005 RS43
- (26308) 1998 SM165
- (554856) 2013 CF229
- (554102) 2012 KW51
- (612892) 2004 TV357
- (495189) 2012 VR113
- (534626) 2014 UT224
- (469505) 2003 FE128
- (535025) 2014 WT509
- (137295) 1999 RB216
- (524179) 2001 FQ185
- (500880) 2013 JJ64
- (20161) 1996 TR66
- (583751) 2016 NZ90
- (531074) 2012 DX98
- (612524) 2002 VD130
- (470083) 2006 SG369
- (612176) 2000 QL251
- (130391) 2000 JG81
- (577578) 2013 GW136
- (581804) 2015 KN167
- (612051) 1997 SZ10
- (500877) 2013 JE64

=== 2:5 resonance (period 411.7 years) ===
There are 57 confirmed 2:5 resonant objects at 55.3 AU as of February 2020.

Objects with well established orbits at 55.4 AU include:

- (26375) 1999 DE9
- (38084) 1999 HB12
- (60621) 2000 FE8
- (69988) 1998 WA31
- (84522) 2002 TC302
- (119068) 2001 KC77
- (135571) 2002 GG32
- (143707) 2003 UY117
- (471151) 2010 FD49
- (471172) 2010 JC80
- 472235 Zhulong
- (495603) 2015 AM281
- (523769) 2014 WS510
- (523713) 2014 JX80
- (524365) 2001 XQ254
- (531017) 2012 BA155
- (535991) 2015 BD519

=== 1:3 resonance (period 494.1 years) ===
(523794) 2015 RR_{245}'s orbit librating in a 2:9 resonance with Neptune

Johnston's Archive counts 14 objects with 1:3 resonance as of February 2020 at 62.5 AU. A dozen of these are secure according to the Deep Ecliptic Survey:

- (136120) 2003 LG7
- (385607) 2005 EO297
- 2004 VU130
- (613469) 2006 QJ181
- 2006 SF369
- 2011 US411
- 2014 FX71
- 2015 BZ517?
- 2015 GA55
- 2015 KY173
- 2015 RA278
- 2015 RZ277?
- 2015 VM166
- 2015 VN166

=== Other resonances ===
As of February 2024, the following higher-order resonances are confirmed for a limited number of objects:

| Ratio | semi major axis (AU) | Period (years) | Objects (count) | Example objects |
|---|---|---|---|---|
| 4:5 | 34.9 | 205.9 | 17 confirmed | (432949) 2012 HH2, (127871) 2003 FC128, (308460) 2005 SC278, (79969) 1999 CP133, (427581) 2003 QB92, (131697) 2001 XH255 |
| 3:4 | 36.4 | 219.6 | 50 confirmed | (143685) 2003 SS317, (15836) 1995 DA2 |
| 5:7 | 37.6 | 226.5 | 1 confirmed | 2013 RD157 |
| 7:10 | 38.6 | 240.2 | 1 confirmed | 2014 UF229 |
| 7:11 | 40.1 | 250.5 | 1 confirmed | (555915) 2014 GX53 |
| 5:8 | 41.1 | 263.5 | 4 confirmed | (533398) 2014 GA54 |
| 7:12 | 43.0 | 282.3 | 1 confirmed | 2015 RP278 |
| 5:9 | 44.5 | 296.5 | 6 confirmed | (437915) 2002 GD32 |
| 6:11 | 45.0 | 301.9 | 4 confirmed | (523725) 2014 MC70, (505477) 2013 UM15 |
| 5:11 | 50.8 | 362.3 | 1 confirmed | 2013 RM109 |
| 4:9 | 51.6 | 370.6 | 5 confirmed | (42301) 2001 UR163, (182397) 2001 QW297 |
| 3:7 | 52.9 | 384.3 | 17 confirmed | (495297) 2013 TJ159, (181867) 1999 CV118, (131696) 2001 XT254, (95625) 2002 GX32, (183964) 2004 DJ71, (500882) 2013 JN64 |
| 5:12 | 53.9 | 395.3 | 6 confirmed | (79978) 1999 CC158, (119878) 2002 CY224 |
| 3:8 | 57.8 | 439.2 | 5 confirmed | (82075) 2000 YW134, (542258) 2013 AP183, 2014 UE228 |
| 4:13 | 65.9 | 535.3 | 3 confirmed | 2006 QH181, 2009 DJ143 |
| 3:10 | 67.0 | 549.0 | 2 confirmed | 225088 Gonggong |
| 2:7 | 69.3 | 576.4 | 17 confirmed | 471143 Dziewanna, (160148) 2001 KV76 |
| 3:11 | 71.4 | 603.9 | 5 confirmed | (534627) 2014 UV224, 2013 AR183 |
| 1:4 | 75.7 | 658.8 | 8 confirmed | 2003 LA7, 2011 UP411 |
| 5:21 | 78.2 | 691.7 | 1 confirmed | (574372) 2010 JO179 |
| 2:9 | 81.9 | 741.1 | 3 confirmed | (523794) 2015 RR245, 2003 UA414, 2018 VG18 |
| 1:5 | 87.9 | 823.5 | 4 confirmed | 2007 FN51, (667161) 2011 BP170 |
| 2:11 | 93.6 | 905.8 | 3 confirmed | (613037) 2005 RP43, 2011 HO60 |
| 1:6 | 99.2 | 988.2 | 4 confirmed | (528381) 2008 ST291, (668381) 2011 WJ157 |
| 1:8 | 120.0 | 1241.1 | 1 confirmed | 2014 RV86 |
| 1:9 | 130.0 | 1482.3 | 2 confirmed | 2007 TC434, 2015 KE172 |
| 1:10 | 140.0 | 1650 | 1 confirmed | 2020 VN40 |

=== Haumea ===
The libration of Haumea's nominal orbit in a rotating frame, with Neptune stationary (see 2 Pallas for an example of non-librating)

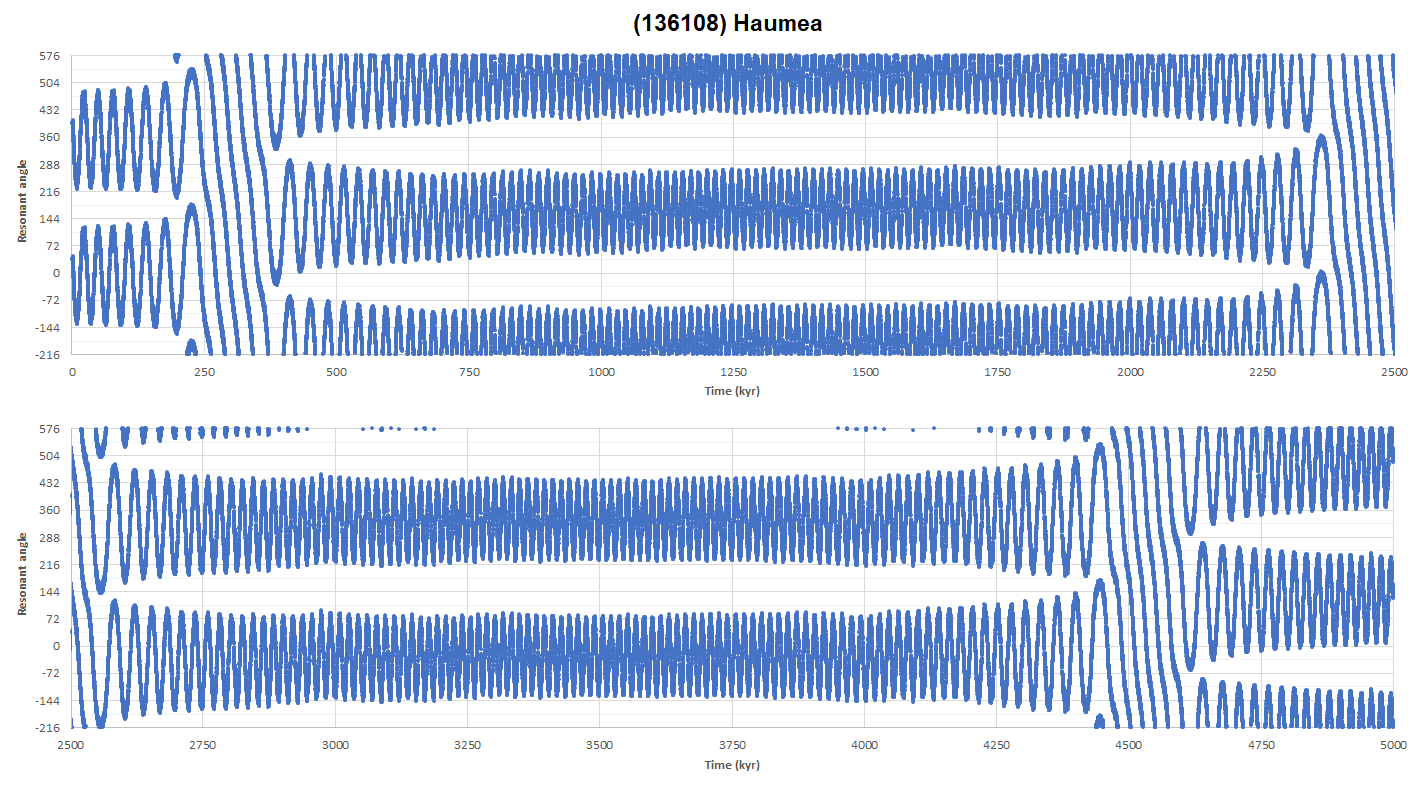
The libration angle $\ \phi\$ of Haumea's weak 7:12 resonance with Neptune, $\ \phi = 12\cdot\lambda - 7\cdot\lambda_{\mathsf N} - 5\cdot\varpi - 1\cdot\Omega\ ,$ over the next 5 million years

Haumea is thought to be in a weak intermittent 7:12 orbital resonance with Neptune. Its ascending node ($\ \Omega\$) precesses with a period of about 4.6 million years, and the resonance is broken twice per precession cycle, or every 2.3 million years, only to return a hundred thousand years or so later. Marc Buie categorizes it as non-resonant.

== Coincidental versus true resonances ==
One of the concerns is that weak resonances may exist and would be difficult to prove due to the current lack of accuracy in the orbits of these distant objects. Many objects have orbital periods of more than 300 years and most have only been observed over a relatively short observation arc of a few years. Due to their great distance and slow movement against background stars, it may be decades before many of these distant orbits are determined well enough to confidently confirm whether a resonance is true or merely coincidental. A true resonance will smoothly oscillate while a coincidental near resonance will circulate. (See Toward a formal definition)

Simulations by Emelʹyanenko and Kiseleva in 2007 show that (131696) 2001 XT254 is librating in a 3:7 resonance with Neptune. This libration can be stable for less than 100 million to billions of years.

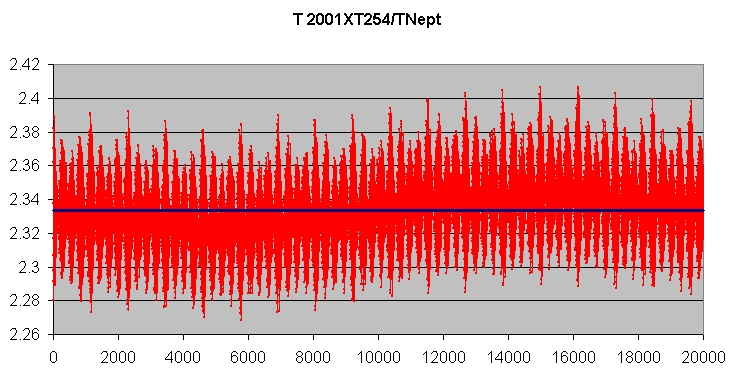
The orbital period of 2001 XT_{254} around the 3:7 resonance (2.333) with Neptune.

Emelʹyanenko and Kiseleva also show that (48639) 1995 TL8 appears to have less than a 1% probability of being in a 3:7 resonance with Neptune, but it does execute circulations near this resonance.

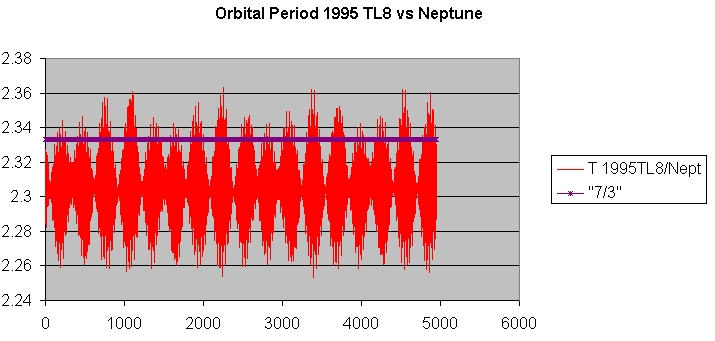
The orbital period of 1995 TL8 missing the 3:7 resonance (2.333) with Neptune.

== Toward a formal definition ==
The classes of TNO have no universally agreed precise definitions, the boundaries are often unclear and the notion of resonance is not defined precisely. The Deep Ecliptic Survey introduced formally defined dynamical classes based on long-term forward integration of orbits under the combined perturbations from all four giant planets. (see also formal definition of classical KBO)

In general, the mean-motion resonance may involve not only orbital periods of the form

$$\ p \cdot \lambda - q \cdot \lambda_{\mathsf N}\$$

where p and q are small integers, λ and λ_{N} are respectively the mean longitudes of the object and Neptune, but can also involve the longitude of the perihelion and the longitudes of the nodes (see orbital resonance, for elementary examples)

An object is resonant if for some small integers $(\ m, n, ~~ p, q, ~~ r, s\ ),$ the argument (angle) defined below is librating (i.e. is bounded):

$$\ \phi = p \cdot \lambda - q \cdot \lambda_{\mathsf N} - m \cdot \varpi - n \cdot \varpi_{\mathsf N} - r \cdot \Omega - s \cdot \Omega_{\mathsf N}\$$

where the $\ \varpi\$ are the longitudes of perihelia and the $\ \Omega\$ are the longitudes of the ascending nodes, for the resonant object (no subscript) and for Neptune (with subscript "N").

The term libration denotes here periodic oscillation of the angle around some value and is opposed to circulation where the angle can take all values from 0°–360°. For example, in the case of Pluto, the resonant angle $\phi$ librates around 180° with an amplitude of around 86.6°, i.e. the angle changes periodically from 93.4°–266.6°.

All new plutinos discovered during the Deep Ecliptic Survey proved to be of the type

$$\ \phi = 3 \cdot \lambda - 2 \cdot \lambda_{\mathsf N} - \varpi\$$

similar to Pluto's mean-motion resonance.

More generally, this 2:3 resonance is an example of a resonance of the form $\ p:(p + 1)\$ (for example 1:2, 2:3, 3:4) that have proved to lead to stable orbits. Their resonant angle is

$$\ \phi = p \cdot \lambda - q \cdot \lambda_{\mathsf N} - (p - q) \cdot \varpi\$$

In this case, the importance of the resonant angle $\ \phi\$ can be understood by noting that when the object is at perihelion, i.e. $\ \lambda = \varpi\ ,$ then

$$\ \phi = q\cdot ( \varpi - \lambda_{\mathsf N} )\$$

i.e. $\ \phi\$ gives a measure of the distance of the object's perihelion from Neptune. The object is protected from the perturbation by keeping its perihelion far from Neptune provided $\ \phi\$ librates around an angle far from 0°.

== Classification methods ==
As the orbital elements are known with a limited precision, the uncertainties may lead to false positives (i.e. classification as resonant of an orbit which is not). A recent approach considers not only the current best-fit orbit but also two additional orbits corresponding to the uncertainties of the observational data. In simple terms, the algorithm determines whether the object would be still classified as resonant if its actual orbit differed from the best fit orbit, as the result of the errors in the observations. The three orbits are numerically integrated over a period of 10 million years. If all three orbits remain resonant (i.e. the argument of the resonance is librating, see formal definition), the classification as a resonant object is considered secure.

If only two out of the three orbits are librating the object is classified as probably in resonance. Finally, if only one orbit passes the test, the vicinity of the resonance is noted to encourage further observations to improve the data. The two extreme values of the semi-major axis used in the algorithm are determined to correspond to uncertainties of the data of at most 3 standard deviations. Such range of semi-axis values should, with a number of assumptions, reduce the probability that the actual orbit is beyond this range to less than 0.3%. The method is applicable to objects with observations spanning at least 3 oppositions.
