= List of minor planets: 678001–679000 =

The following is a partial list of minor planets, running from minor-planet number 678001 through 679000, inclusive. The primary data for this and other partial lists is based on JPL's "Small-Body Orbital Elements" and data available from the Minor Planet Center. Critical list information is also provided by the MPC, unless otherwise specified from Lowell Observatory. A detailed description of the table's columns and additional sources are given on the main page including a complete list of every page in this series, and a statistical break-up on the dynamical classification of minor planets.

Also see the summary list of all named bodies in numerical and alphabetical order, and the corresponding naming citations for the number range of this particular list. New namings may only be added to this list after official publication, as the preannouncement of names is condemned by the Working Group for Small Bodies Nomenclature of the International Astronomical Union.

Near-Earth obj.	MBA (inner)	MBA (outer)	Centaur
Mars-crosser	MBA (middle)	Jupiter trojan	Trans-Neptunian obj.
Unclassified

== 678001–678100 ==
Designation			Discovery			Properties		Ref
Permanent	Provisional	Named after	Date	Site	Discoverer(s)	Category	Diam.	Ref
678001	2017 FH_{94}	—	May 12, 2012	Haleakala	Pan-STARRS 1	·	3.6 km	MPC · JPL
678002	2017 FO_{94}	—	October 3, 2003	Kitt Peak	Spacewatch	·	3.5 km	MPC · JPL
678003	2017 FM_{95}	—	October 9, 2007	Mount Lemmon	Mount Lemmon Survey	·	2.9 km	MPC · JPL
678004	2017 FC_{96}	—	December 26, 2005	Kitt Peak	Spacewatch	·	810 m	MPC · JPL
678005	2017 FU_{96}	—	February 20, 2012	Haleakala	Pan-STARRS 1	·	2.8 km	MPC · JPL
678006	2017 FG_{98}	—	February 28, 2008	Mount Lemmon	Mount Lemmon Survey	·	1.6 km	MPC · JPL
678007	2017 FL_{98}	—	October 27, 2005	Mount Lemmon	Mount Lemmon Survey	KOR	1.5 km	MPC · JPL
678008	2017 FB_{100}	—	November 4, 2012	Catalina	CSS	·	1 km	MPC · JPL
678009	2017 FX_{100}	—	September 29, 2009	Mount Lemmon	Mount Lemmon Survey	·	3.0 km	MPC · JPL
678010	2017 FE_{101}	—	March 25, 2017	Mount Lemmon	Mount Lemmon Survey	APO	520 m	MPC · JPL
678011	2017 FE_{103}	—	April 20, 2006	Kitt Peak	Spacewatch	·	3.0 km	MPC · JPL
678012	2017 FK_{106}	—	January 28, 2011	Mount Lemmon	Mount Lemmon Survey	·	1.7 km	MPC · JPL
678013	2017 FH_{107}	—	November 19, 2009	Mount Lemmon	Mount Lemmon Survey	EOS	1.8 km	MPC · JPL
678014	2017 FC_{110}	—	January 31, 2006	Kitt Peak	Spacewatch	·	780 m	MPC · JPL
678015	2017 FG_{111}	—	January 10, 2007	Mount Lemmon	Mount Lemmon Survey	·	680 m	MPC · JPL
678016	2017 FH_{113}	—	September 19, 2003	Kitt Peak	Spacewatch	EOS	1.6 km	MPC · JPL
678017	2017 FU_{117}	—	October 18, 2011	Mount Lemmon	Mount Lemmon Survey	·	640 m	MPC · JPL
678018	2017 FA_{121}	—	April 25, 2012	Mount Lemmon	Mount Lemmon Survey	·	2.9 km	MPC · JPL
678019	2017 FV_{121}	—	September 18, 2003	Kitt Peak	Spacewatch	EOS	2.2 km	MPC · JPL
678020	2017 FW_{121}	—	February 8, 2013	Kitt Peak	Spacewatch	MAS	660 m	MPC · JPL
678021	2017 FZ_{124}	—	May 27, 2012	Mount Lemmon	Mount Lemmon Survey	·	2.6 km	MPC · JPL
678022	2017 FC_{125}	—	October 9, 2008	Kitt Peak	Spacewatch	·	3.4 km	MPC · JPL
678023	2017 FD_{125}	—	January 8, 2011	Mount Lemmon	Mount Lemmon Survey	·	2.1 km	MPC · JPL
678024	2017 FL_{125}	—	March 10, 2000	Kitt Peak	Spacewatch	·	2.7 km	MPC · JPL
678025	2017 FV_{125}	—	March 4, 2017	Haleakala	Pan-STARRS 1	·	580 m	MPC · JPL
678026	2017 FD_{126}	—	August 7, 2008	Kitt Peak	Spacewatch	VER	2.7 km	MPC · JPL
678027	2017 FH_{126}	—	December 4, 2015	Mount Lemmon	Mount Lemmon Survey	PHO	970 m	MPC · JPL
678028	2017 FB_{127}	—	January 31, 2006	Mount Lemmon	Mount Lemmon Survey	·	2.0 km	MPC · JPL
678029	2017 FR_{129}	—	October 19, 2011	Mount Lemmon	Mount Lemmon Survey	·	640 m	MPC · JPL
678030	2017 FU_{129}	—	March 19, 2013	Haleakala	Pan-STARRS 1	·	760 m	MPC · JPL
678031	2017 FP_{130}	—	May 15, 2007	Mount Lemmon	Mount Lemmon Survey	·	620 m	MPC · JPL
678032	2017 FQ_{130}	—	March 4, 2006	Mount Lemmon	Mount Lemmon Survey	·	2.0 km	MPC · JPL
678033	2017 FR_{130}	—	November 14, 2015	Mount Lemmon	Mount Lemmon Survey	·	960 m	MPC · JPL
678034	2017 FF_{132}	—	October 7, 2004	Kitt Peak	Spacewatch	·	880 m	MPC · JPL
678035	2017 FA_{133}	—	March 23, 2003	Apache Point	SDSS Collaboration	V	470 m	MPC · JPL
678036	2017 FE_{133}	—	October 22, 2005	Kitt Peak	Spacewatch	·	2.1 km	MPC · JPL
678037	2017 FL_{133}	—	April 11, 2013	Mount Lemmon	Mount Lemmon Survey	·	1.3 km	MPC · JPL
678038	2017 FO_{133}	—	January 27, 2006	Mount Lemmon	Mount Lemmon Survey	·	690 m	MPC · JPL
678039	2017 FR_{134}	—	February 2, 2012	Kitt Peak	Spacewatch	GEF	880 m	MPC · JPL
678040	2017 FH_{136}	—	July 31, 2014	Haleakala	Pan-STARRS 1	·	1.9 km	MPC · JPL
678041	2017 FK_{136}	—	May 8, 2006	Mount Lemmon	Mount Lemmon Survey	·	780 m	MPC · JPL
678042	2017 FM_{136}	—	December 1, 2005	Kitt Peak	Spacewatch	KOR	2.0 km	MPC · JPL
678043	2017 FS_{136}	—	March 26, 2017	Mount Lemmon	Mount Lemmon Survey	·	700 m	MPC · JPL
678044	2017 FZ_{137}	—	March 4, 2011	Kitt Peak	Spacewatch	·	2.5 km	MPC · JPL
678045	2017 FB_{138}	—	September 28, 2003	Kitt Peak	Spacewatch	·	2.0 km	MPC · JPL
678046	2017 FE_{138}	—	August 18, 2014	Haleakala	Pan-STARRS 1	HNS	830 m	MPC · JPL
678047	2017 FN_{138}	—	September 27, 2009	Mount Lemmon	Mount Lemmon Survey	EOS	1.6 km	MPC · JPL
678048	2017 FM_{139}	—	August 22, 2004	Kitt Peak	Spacewatch	KOR	1.1 km	MPC · JPL
678049	2017 FN_{139}	—	March 21, 2012	Mount Lemmon	Mount Lemmon Survey	·	1.5 km	MPC · JPL
678050	2017 FV_{139}	—	January 4, 2016	Haleakala	Pan-STARRS 1	(1118)	2.7 km	MPC · JPL
678051	2017 FN_{142}	—	March 8, 2005	Mount Lemmon	Mount Lemmon Survey	·	3.3 km	MPC · JPL
678052	2017 FX_{144}	—	July 16, 2013	Haleakala	Pan-STARRS 1	·	2.7 km	MPC · JPL
678053	2017 FZ_{144}	—	September 29, 2010	Mount Lemmon	Mount Lemmon Survey	NEM	1.9 km	MPC · JPL
678054	2017 FV_{149}	—	January 25, 2006	Kitt Peak	Spacewatch	·	850 m	MPC · JPL
678055	2017 FR_{153}	—	May 3, 2006	Mount Lemmon	Mount Lemmon Survey	·	3.3 km	MPC · JPL
678056	2017 FK_{155}	—	September 10, 2013	Haleakala	Pan-STARRS 1	·	3.4 km	MPC · JPL
678057	2017 FL_{156}	—	July 18, 2004	Siding Spring	SSS	PHO	1.1 km	MPC · JPL
678058	2017 FH_{157}	—	February 18, 2010	Kitt Peak	Spacewatch	·	690 m	MPC · JPL
678059	2017 FB_{158}	—	October 7, 2008	Mount Lemmon	Mount Lemmon Survey	·	3.5 km	MPC · JPL
678060	2017 FP_{159}	—	February 27, 2009	Kitt Peak	Spacewatch	3:2	4.3 km	MPC · JPL
678061	2017 FC_{160}	—	January 4, 2016	Haleakala	Pan-STARRS 1	·	3.2 km	MPC · JPL
678062	2017 FR_{161}	—	February 28, 2012	Haleakala	Pan-STARRS 1	·	1.9 km	MPC · JPL
678063	2017 FD_{164}	—	March 20, 2017	Haleakala	Pan-STARRS 1	·	1.4 km	MPC · JPL
678064	2017 FK_{164}	—	March 20, 2017	Haleakala	Pan-STARRS 1	·	1.9 km	MPC · JPL
678065	2017 FC_{166}	—	March 20, 2017	Haleakala	Pan-STARRS 1	·	670 m	MPC · JPL
678066	2017 FE_{171}	—	May 18, 2007	Kitt Peak	Spacewatch	EOS	1.4 km	MPC · JPL
678067	2017 FO_{188}	—	March 23, 2017	Haleakala	Pan-STARRS 1	·	830 m	MPC · JPL
678068	2017 FX_{193}	—	March 25, 2017	Mount Lemmon	Mount Lemmon Survey	·	710 m	MPC · JPL
678069	2017 FK_{198}	—	March 28, 2017	Haleakala	Pan-STARRS 1	·	700 m	MPC · JPL
678070	2017 GO	—	April 26, 2006	Kitt Peak	Spacewatch	·	3.3 km	MPC · JPL
678071	2017 GR_{2}	—	October 1, 2008	Kitt Peak	Spacewatch	HYG	3.2 km	MPC · JPL
678072	2017 GO_{3}	—	February 2, 2006	Mount Lemmon	Mount Lemmon Survey	·	2.3 km	MPC · JPL
678073	2017 GK_{5}	—	October 30, 2013	Kitt Peak	Spacewatch	·	380 m	MPC · JPL
678074	2017 GO_{8}	—	August 27, 2014	Haleakala	Pan-STARRS 1	·	2.2 km	MPC · JPL
678075	2017 GQ_{8}	—	August 27, 2009	Kitt Peak	Spacewatch	·	1.9 km	MPC · JPL
678076	2017 GC_{13}	—	June 13, 2005	Kitt Peak	Spacewatch	·	970 m	MPC · JPL
678077	2017 GD_{14}	—	April 6, 2017	Mount Lemmon	Mount Lemmon Survey	PHO	760 m	MPC · JPL
678078	2017 GS_{14}	—	April 1, 2017	Haleakala	Pan-STARRS 1	·	1.1 km	MPC · JPL
678079	2017 GQ_{17}	—	March 29, 2017	Haleakala	Pan-STARRS 1	·	670 m	MPC · JPL
678080	2017 HD_{1}	—	September 2, 2008	Hibiscus	Teamo, N., S. F. Hönig	·	720 m	MPC · JPL
678081	2017 HD_{2}	—	July 25, 2015	Haleakala	Pan-STARRS 1	H	390 m	MPC · JPL
678082	2017 HM_{5}	—	November 20, 2008	Kitt Peak	Spacewatch	·	730 m	MPC · JPL
678083	2017 HD_{6}	—	August 6, 2007	Lulin	LUSS	TIR	3.1 km	MPC · JPL
678084	2017 HW_{6}	—	August 25, 2014	Haleakala	Pan-STARRS 1	·	1.5 km	MPC · JPL
678085	2017 HY_{6}	—	September 1, 2013	Mount Lemmon	Mount Lemmon Survey	·	2.4 km	MPC · JPL
678086	2017 HC_{8}	—	November 22, 2009	Kitt Peak	Spacewatch	·	3.0 km	MPC · JPL
678087	2017 HK_{9}	—	May 6, 2006	Mount Lemmon	Mount Lemmon Survey	HYG	3.4 km	MPC · JPL
678088	2017 HE_{10}	—	March 24, 2014	Haleakala	Pan-STARRS 1	H	630 m	MPC · JPL
678089	2017 HN_{10}	—	January 28, 2000	Kitt Peak	Spacewatch	TIR	2.9 km	MPC · JPL
678090	2017 HR_{13}	—	July 30, 2014	Haleakala	Pan-STARRS 1	·	710 m	MPC · JPL
678091	2017 HM_{14}	—	April 19, 2017	Mount Lemmon	Mount Lemmon Survey	·	800 m	MPC · JPL
678092	2017 HW_{16}	—	November 24, 2003	Kitt Peak	Deep Ecliptic Survey	VER	2.9 km	MPC · JPL
678093	2017 HM_{17}	—	September 26, 2011	Mount Lemmon	Mount Lemmon Survey	·	930 m	MPC · JPL
678094	2017 HZ_{17}	—	March 18, 2010	Kitt Peak	Spacewatch	·	580 m	MPC · JPL
678095	2017 HD_{21}	—	March 24, 2017	Haleakala	Pan-STARRS 1	PHO	780 m	MPC · JPL
678096	2017 HG_{21}	—	January 27, 2006	Mount Lemmon	Mount Lemmon Survey	·	3.4 km	MPC · JPL
678097	2017 HS_{22}	—	November 25, 2009	Kitt Peak	Spacewatch	·	2.2 km	MPC · JPL
678098	2017 HA_{25}	—	April 25, 2017	ESA OGS	ESA OGS	PHO	830 m	MPC · JPL
678099	2017 HZ_{31}	—	October 26, 2008	Mount Lemmon	Mount Lemmon Survey	·	3.3 km	MPC · JPL
678100	2017 HF_{32}	—	July 8, 2014	Haleakala	Pan-STARRS 1	·	890 m	MPC · JPL

== 678101–678200 ==
back to top

Designation			Discovery			Properties		Ref
Permanent	Provisional	Named after	Date	Site	Discoverer(s)	Category	Diam.	Ref
678101	2017 HC_{33}	—	October 3, 2013	Haleakala	Pan-STARRS 1	·	2.6 km	MPC · JPL
678102	2017 HE_{33}	—	August 20, 2008	Kitt Peak	Spacewatch	·	1.7 km	MPC · JPL
678103	2017 HX_{33}	—	February 14, 2013	Mount Lemmon	Mount Lemmon Survey	·	1.2 km	MPC · JPL
678104	2017 HC_{36}	—	October 19, 2003	Apache Point	SDSS Collaboration	·	830 m	MPC · JPL
678105	2017 HN_{37}	—	March 23, 2017	Haleakala	Pan-STARRS 1	·	1.1 km	MPC · JPL
678106	2017 HD_{40}	—	October 25, 2005	Mount Lemmon	Mount Lemmon Survey	3:2	4.5 km	MPC · JPL
678107	2017 HW_{49}	—	September 2, 2014	Haleakala	Pan-STARRS 1	·	1.7 km	MPC · JPL
678108	2017 HE_{56}	—	February 13, 2013	Haleakala	Pan-STARRS 1	·	1.2 km	MPC · JPL
678109	2017 HB_{63}	—	April 20, 2017	Mount Lemmon	Mount Lemmon Survey	TIN	1.0 km	MPC · JPL
678110	2017 HK_{63}	—	May 10, 1996	Kitt Peak	Spacewatch	·	1.3 km	MPC · JPL
678111	2017 HO_{63}	—	April 25, 2017	Haleakala	Pan-STARRS 1	·	970 m	MPC · JPL
678112	2017 HJ_{67}	—	April 19, 2017	Haleakala	Pan-STARRS 1	PHO	780 m	MPC · JPL
678113	2017 HU_{75}	—	April 25, 2017	Haleakala	Pan-STARRS 1	·	1.2 km	MPC · JPL
678114	2017 JN	—	September 22, 2003	Kitt Peak	Spacewatch	·	2.9 km	MPC · JPL
678115	2017 JT_{3}	—	September 15, 2014	Mount Lemmon	Mount Lemmon Survey	·	1.0 km	MPC · JPL
678116	2017 JF_{7}	—	May 4, 2017	Haleakala	Pan-STARRS 1	(194)	1.1 km	MPC · JPL
678117	2017 JL_{10}	—	April 26, 2017	Haleakala	Pan-STARRS 1	·	820 m	MPC · JPL
678118	2017 KS_{1}	—	March 12, 2011	Mount Lemmon	Mount Lemmon Survey	·	2.9 km	MPC · JPL
678119	2017 KB_{2}	—	April 21, 2012	Haleakala	Pan-STARRS 1	·	2.0 km	MPC · JPL
678120	2017 KM_{2}	—	March 29, 2017	Haleakala	Pan-STARRS 1	H	430 m	MPC · JPL
678121	2017 KZ_{5}	—	April 3, 2006	La Silla	La Silla	·	2.9 km	MPC · JPL
678122	2017 KD_{7}	—	May 16, 2013	Mount Lemmon	Mount Lemmon Survey	·	1.1 km	MPC · JPL
678123	2017 KP_{9}	—	November 19, 2008	Kitt Peak	Spacewatch	PHO	810 m	MPC · JPL
678124	2017 KW_{12}	—	March 7, 2013	Kitt Peak	Spacewatch	·	860 m	MPC · JPL
678125	2017 KY_{12}	—	April 25, 2017	Haleakala	Pan-STARRS 1	·	1.3 km	MPC · JPL
678126	2017 KC_{13}	—	June 7, 2013	Haleakala	Pan-STARRS 1	·	780 m	MPC · JPL
678127	2017 KU_{15}	—	December 22, 2005	Kitt Peak	Spacewatch	·	710 m	MPC · JPL
678128	2017 KQ_{19}	—	December 5, 2008	Mount Lemmon	Mount Lemmon Survey	EOS	2.1 km	MPC · JPL
678129	2017 KM_{20}	—	August 20, 2014	Haleakala	Pan-STARRS 1	·	880 m	MPC · JPL
678130	2017 KQ_{22}	—	September 23, 2011	Haleakala	Pan-STARRS 1	V	560 m	MPC · JPL
678131	2017 KX_{24}	—	November 6, 2015	Mount Lemmon	Mount Lemmon Survey	·	1.8 km	MPC · JPL
678132	2017 KA_{29}	—	December 1, 2015	Haleakala	Pan-STARRS 1	H	360 m	MPC · JPL
678133	2017 KR_{29}	—	November 19, 2003	Kitt Peak	Spacewatch	·	3.0 km	MPC · JPL
678134	2017 KX_{31}	—	April 22, 2017	Mount Lemmon	Mount Lemmon Survey	H	350 m	MPC · JPL
678135	2017 KM_{33}	—	May 20, 2006	Kitt Peak	Spacewatch	·	3.1 km	MPC · JPL
678136	2017 KF_{34}	—	May 5, 2017	Mount Lemmon	Mount Lemmon Survey	H	420 m	MPC · JPL
678137	2017 KG_{34}	—	January 23, 2014	Mount Lemmon	Mount Lemmon Survey	H	330 m	MPC · JPL
678138	2017 KZ_{35}	—	January 17, 2015	Haleakala	Pan-STARRS 1	·	1.3 km	MPC · JPL
678139	2017 KG_{36}	—	March 19, 2013	Haleakala	Pan-STARRS 1	NYS	890 m	MPC · JPL
678140	2017 KE_{41}	—	May 17, 2017	Haleakala	Pan-STARRS 1	·	1.2 km	MPC · JPL
678141	2017 KZ_{42}	—	May 21, 2017	Haleakala	Pan-STARRS 1	·	1.2 km	MPC · JPL
678142	2017 KE_{44}	—	May 27, 2017	Haleakala	Pan-STARRS 1	·	1.1 km	MPC · JPL
678143	2017 LY_{1}	—	September 19, 2014	Haleakala	Pan-STARRS 1	·	1.4 km	MPC · JPL
678144	2017 LE_{2}	—	June 2, 2017	Cerro Tololo	M. Micheli, F. Valdes	·	730 m	MPC · JPL
678145	2017 LZ_{2}	—	June 4, 2017	Kitt Peak	Spacewatch	·	1.9 km	MPC · JPL
678146	2017 LE_{3}	—	March 28, 2016	Cerro Tololo-DECam	DECam	·	1.4 km	MPC · JPL
678147	2017 ML_{1}	—	April 4, 2017	Haleakala	Pan-STARRS 1	·	810 m	MPC · JPL
678148	2017 MT_{3}	—	May 20, 2012	Haleakala	Pan-STARRS 1	H	300 m	MPC · JPL
678149	2017 ML_{9}	—	June 21, 2017	Haleakala	Pan-STARRS 1	·	1.3 km	MPC · JPL
678150	2017 MP_{11}	—	June 25, 2017	Haleakala	Pan-STARRS 1	·	1.0 km	MPC · JPL
678151	2017 ME_{15}	—	June 23, 2017	Haleakala	Pan-STARRS 1	HNS	960 m	MPC · JPL
678152	2017 MP_{16}	—	June 25, 2017	Haleakala	Pan-STARRS 1	·	1.2 km	MPC · JPL
678153	2017 MC_{18}	—	June 26, 2017	Mount Lemmon	Mount Lemmon Survey	JUN	850 m	MPC · JPL
678154	2017 MA_{20}	—	September 26, 2013	Catalina	CSS	MAR	1 km	MPC · JPL
678155	2017 MY_{20}	—	June 24, 2017	Haleakala	Pan-STARRS 1	LIX	3.0 km	MPC · JPL
678156	2017 MA_{32}	—	January 20, 2015	Mount Lemmon	Mount Lemmon Survey	·	1.7 km	MPC · JPL
678157	2017 MT_{32}	—	November 14, 2010	Mount Lemmon	Mount Lemmon Survey	·	830 m	MPC · JPL
678158	2017 NJ	—	January 8, 2013	Haleakala	Pan-STARRS 1	T_{j} (2.89)	2.1 km	MPC · JPL
678159	2017 NZ	—	February 1, 2006	Mount Lemmon	Mount Lemmon Survey	·	2.3 km	MPC · JPL
678160	2017 NO_{1}	—	October 6, 2013	Mayhill	L. Elenin	ADE	1.7 km	MPC · JPL
678161	2017 NY_{4}	—	October 30, 2013	Catalina	CSS	·	1.7 km	MPC · JPL
678162	2017 NT_{7}	—	July 5, 2017	Haleakala	Pan-STARRS 1	·	1 km	MPC · JPL
678163	2017 NW_{11}	—	July 4, 2017	Haleakala	Pan-STARRS 1	·	1.8 km	MPC · JPL
678164	2017 NB_{12}	—	July 1, 2017	Haleakala	Pan-STARRS 1	·	1.4 km	MPC · JPL
678165	2017 NZ_{12}	—	July 1, 2017	Haleakala	Pan-STARRS 1	·	960 m	MPC · JPL
678166	2017 NQ_{18}	—	July 1, 2017	Haleakala	Pan-STARRS 1	V	470 m	MPC · JPL
678167	2017 OA_{3}	—	July 22, 2017	Haleakala	Pan-STARRS 1	·	1.0 km	MPC · JPL
678168	2017 OE_{4}	—	August 17, 2006	Palomar	NEAT	·	980 m	MPC · JPL
678169	2017 OH_{6}	—	October 28, 2014	Haleakala	Pan-STARRS 1	·	720 m	MPC · JPL
678170	2017 ON_{8}	—	July 5, 2017	Haleakala	Pan-STARRS 1	·	1.9 km	MPC · JPL
678171	2017 OJ_{9}	—	March 16, 2016	Mount Lemmon	Mount Lemmon Survey	·	1.4 km	MPC · JPL
678172	2017 ON_{9}	—	June 11, 2013	Mount Lemmon	Mount Lemmon Survey	·	1.5 km	MPC · JPL
678173	2017 OA_{12}	—	October 2, 2013	Haleakala	Pan-STARRS 1	WIT	710 m	MPC · JPL
678174	2017 OO_{12}	—	June 21, 2017	Haleakala	Pan-STARRS 1	·	1.8 km	MPC · JPL
678175	2017 OD_{17}	—	August 29, 2006	Kitt Peak	Spacewatch	·	1.2 km	MPC · JPL
678176	2017 OG_{17}	—	October 5, 2013	Haleakala	Pan-STARRS 1	·	1.4 km	MPC · JPL
678177	2017 OY_{19}	—	May 24, 2014	Haleakala	Pan-STARRS 1	H	380 m	MPC · JPL
678178	2017 OY_{28}	—	April 3, 2008	Mount Lemmon	Mount Lemmon Survey	EUN	720 m	MPC · JPL
678179	2017 OG_{30}	—	February 25, 2015	Haleakala	Pan-STARRS 1	·	1.8 km	MPC · JPL
678180	2017 OL_{31}	—	October 3, 2014	Mount Lemmon	Mount Lemmon Survey	·	540 m	MPC · JPL
678181	2017 OD_{35}	—	January 20, 2015	Haleakala	Pan-STARRS 1	·	1.5 km	MPC · JPL
678182	2017 OQ_{43}	—	July 27, 2017	Haleakala	Pan-STARRS 1	GAL	1.1 km	MPC · JPL
678183	2017 OC_{49}	—	May 15, 2005	Mount Lemmon	Mount Lemmon Survey	NYS	1.3 km	MPC · JPL
678184	2017 OQ_{49}	—	March 4, 2005	Kitt Peak	Spacewatch	MAS	860 m	MPC · JPL
678185	2017 OU_{51}	—	February 11, 2011	Mount Lemmon	Mount Lemmon Survey	·	1.0 km	MPC · JPL
678186	2017 OW_{57}	—	July 30, 2017	Haleakala	Pan-STARRS 1	·	1.6 km	MPC · JPL
678187	2017 OG_{59}	—	September 18, 2003	Palomar	NEAT	·	1.9 km	MPC · JPL
678188	2017 OR_{60}	—	February 9, 2016	Haleakala	Pan-STARRS 1	·	980 m	MPC · JPL
678189	2017 OV_{60}	—	October 6, 2013	Catalina	CSS	·	1.1 km	MPC · JPL
678190	2017 OW_{62}	—	August 22, 2003	Palomar	NEAT	GEF	1.3 km	MPC · JPL
678191	2017 OF_{69}	—	July 26, 2017	Mauna Kea	D. J. Tholen, S. S. Sheppard, C. A. Trujillo	plutino	662 km	MPC · JPL
678192	2017 OQ_{69}	—	July 30, 2017	Haleakala	Pan-STARRS 1	(18466)	1.7 km	MPC · JPL
678193	2017 OB_{70}	—	September 6, 2008	Catalina	CSS	·	1.6 km	MPC · JPL
678194	2017 OK_{70}	—	July 30, 2017	Haleakala	Pan-STARRS 1	·	840 m	MPC · JPL
678195	2017 OR_{72}	—	April 19, 2015	Cerro Tololo-DECam	DECam	·	1.3 km	MPC · JPL
678196	2017 OW_{84}	—	July 25, 2017	Haleakala	Pan-STARRS 1	H	430 m	MPC · JPL
678197	2017 OZ_{84}	—	July 30, 2017	Haleakala	Pan-STARRS 1	H	430 m	MPC · JPL
678198 Jeanmariferenbac	2017 OA_{85}	Jeanmariferenbac	October 9, 2013	Oukaïmeden	M. Ory	·	1.5 km	MPC · JPL
678199	2017 OO_{88}	—	July 30, 2017	Haleakala	Pan-STARRS 1	·	1.8 km	MPC · JPL
678200	2017 OL_{89}	—	February 23, 2015	Haleakala	Pan-STARRS 1	EOS	1.7 km	MPC · JPL

== 678201–678300 ==
back to top

Designation			Discovery			Properties		Ref
Permanent	Provisional	Named after	Date	Site	Discoverer(s)	Category	Diam.	Ref
678201	2017 OX_{89}	—	July 24, 2017	Haleakala	Pan-STARRS 1	·	900 m	MPC · JPL
678202	2017 OK_{92}	—	March 12, 2016	Haleakala	Pan-STARRS 1	·	1.3 km	MPC · JPL
678203	2017 OP_{92}	—	July 30, 2017	Haleakala	Pan-STARRS 1	BRG	1.3 km	MPC · JPL
678204	2017 OS_{92}	—	July 30, 2017	Haleakala	Pan-STARRS 1	·	880 m	MPC · JPL
678205	2017 OL_{96}	—	July 26, 2017	Haleakala	Pan-STARRS 1	·	1.4 km	MPC · JPL
678206	2017 OP_{104}	—	July 25, 2017	Haleakala	Pan-STARRS 1	·	910 m	MPC · JPL
678207	2017 OW_{106}	—	July 29, 2017	Haleakala	Pan-STARRS 1	·	2.2 km	MPC · JPL
678208	2017 OK_{114}	—	July 27, 2017	Haleakala	Pan-STARRS 1	·	1.2 km	MPC · JPL
678209	2017 OX_{119}	—	July 30, 2017	Haleakala	Pan-STARRS 1	·	1.6 km	MPC · JPL
678210	2017 ON_{122}	—	October 6, 2013	Catalina	CSS	·	1.8 km	MPC · JPL
678211	2017 OZ_{122}	—	March 28, 2016	Cerro Tololo-DECam	DECam	·	1.1 km	MPC · JPL
678212	2017 OG_{126}	—	July 30, 2017	Haleakala	Pan-STARRS 1	·	1.2 km	MPC · JPL
678213	2017 OV_{166}	—	January 18, 2009	Kitt Peak	Spacewatch	EOS	1.6 km	MPC · JPL
678214	2017 PB_{4}	—	September 4, 2008	Kitt Peak	Spacewatch	·	1.4 km	MPC · JPL
678215	2017 PV_{5}	—	February 26, 2011	Mount Lemmon	Mount Lemmon Survey	·	1.8 km	MPC · JPL
678216	2017 PN_{11}	—	February 27, 2006	Mount Lemmon	Mount Lemmon Survey	·	1.5 km	MPC · JPL
678217	2017 PO_{12}	—	August 1, 2017	Haleakala	Pan-STARRS 1	·	870 m	MPC · JPL
678218	2017 PY_{12}	—	September 3, 2013	Calar Alto	F. Hormuth	·	1.1 km	MPC · JPL
678219	2017 PS_{13}	—	August 1, 2017	Haleakala	Pan-STARRS 1	·	1.6 km	MPC · JPL
678220	2017 PC_{16}	—	October 5, 2013	Kitt Peak	Spacewatch	AGN	1.0 km	MPC · JPL
678221	2017 PH_{17}	—	August 1, 2017	Haleakala	Pan-STARRS 1	·	1.2 km	MPC · JPL
678222	2017 PX_{20}	—	November 24, 2013	Haleakala	Pan-STARRS 1	·	1.5 km	MPC · JPL
678223	2017 PB_{22}	—	October 3, 2013	Mount Lemmon	Mount Lemmon Survey	·	1.1 km	MPC · JPL
678224	2017 PO_{25}	—	May 7, 2014	Mount Lemmon	Mount Lemmon Survey	H	610 m	MPC · JPL
678225	2017 PT_{26}	—	July 17, 2012	Cerro Burek	Burek, Cerro	H	420 m	MPC · JPL
678226	2017 PN_{27}	—	June 18, 2013	Haleakala	Pan-STARRS 1	MAS	700 m	MPC · JPL
678227	2017 PR_{29}	—	February 27, 2012	Haleakala	Pan-STARRS 1	·	810 m	MPC · JPL
678228	2017 PK_{30}	—	July 25, 2017	Haleakala	Pan-STARRS 1	PHO	810 m	MPC · JPL
678229	2017 PK_{31}	—	February 7, 2011	Mount Lemmon	Mount Lemmon Survey	·	1.5 km	MPC · JPL
678230	2017 PL_{33}	—	September 4, 2008	Kitt Peak	Spacewatch	AGN	860 m	MPC · JPL
678231	2017 PA_{34}	—	January 5, 2012	Haleakala	Pan-STARRS 1	·	950 m	MPC · JPL
678232	2017 PB_{41}	—	December 27, 2005	Kitt Peak	Spacewatch	·	2.1 km	MPC · JPL
678233	2017 PD_{41}	—	February 10, 2016	Haleakala	Pan-STARRS 1	·	1.3 km	MPC · JPL
678234	2017 PR_{41}	—	August 1, 2017	Haleakala	Pan-STARRS 1	·	2.3 km	MPC · JPL
678235	2017 PE_{42}	—	August 1, 2017	Haleakala	Pan-STARRS 1	INA	2.4 km	MPC · JPL
678236	2017 PL_{42}	—	August 3, 2017	Haleakala	Pan-STARRS 1	·	1.1 km	MPC · JPL
678237	2017 PX_{42}	—	August 3, 2017	Haleakala	Pan-STARRS 1	·	1.1 km	MPC · JPL
678238	2017 PB_{43}	—	August 4, 2017	Haleakala	Pan-STARRS 1	·	1.6 km	MPC · JPL
678239	2017 PQ_{43}	—	April 18, 2015	Cerro Tololo-DECam	DECam	·	1.8 km	MPC · JPL
678240	2017 PU_{43}	—	August 1, 2017	Haleakala	Pan-STARRS 1	·	1.6 km	MPC · JPL
678241	2017 PJ_{45}	—	August 5, 2017	Haleakala	Pan-STARRS 1	EOS	1.4 km	MPC · JPL
678242	2017 PK_{45}	—	August 4, 2017	Haleakala	Pan-STARRS 1	·	1.3 km	MPC · JPL
678243	2017 PO_{48}	—	August 4, 2017	Haleakala	Pan-STARRS 1	·	1.4 km	MPC · JPL
678244	2017 PU_{48}	—	August 4, 2017	Haleakala	Pan-STARRS 1	·	1.2 km	MPC · JPL
678245	2017 PE_{49}	—	July 8, 2003	Palomar	NEAT	·	1.2 km	MPC · JPL
678246	2017 PS_{53}	—	August 3, 2017	Haleakala	Pan-STARRS 1	·	1.5 km	MPC · JPL
678247	2017 PT_{53}	—	August 6, 2017	Haleakala	Pan-STARRS 1	·	1.5 km	MPC · JPL
678248	2017 PH_{54}	—	August 3, 2017	Haleakala	Pan-STARRS 1	·	780 m	MPC · JPL
678249	2017 PU_{54}	—	August 1, 2017	Haleakala	Pan-STARRS 1	·	2.3 km	MPC · JPL
678250	2017 PY_{54}	—	August 1, 2017	Haleakala	Pan-STARRS 1	·	1.5 km	MPC · JPL
678251	2017 PC_{55}	—	August 3, 2017	Haleakala	Pan-STARRS 1	·	1.0 km	MPC · JPL
678252	2017 PA_{59}	—	August 1, 2017	Haleakala	Pan-STARRS 1	·	1.5 km	MPC · JPL
678253	2017 PV_{63}	—	August 15, 2017	Haleakala	Pan-STARRS 1	EUN	1.1 km	MPC · JPL
678254	2017 PY_{65}	—	May 3, 2016	Cerro Tololo-DECam	DECam	·	770 m	MPC · JPL
678255	2017 PN_{76}	—	January 22, 2015	Haleakala	Pan-STARRS 1	·	1.3 km	MPC · JPL
678256	2017 QE	—	September 17, 2007	Bergisch Gladbach	W. Bickel	H	480 m	MPC · JPL
678257	2017 QE_{4}	—	October 3, 2013	Mount Lemmon	Mount Lemmon Survey	AGN	890 m	MPC · JPL
678258	2017 QQ_{5}	—	April 12, 2016	Haleakala	Pan-STARRS 1	·	1.4 km	MPC · JPL
678259	2017 QR_{8}	—	March 2, 2011	Mount Lemmon	Mount Lemmon Survey	·	1.8 km	MPC · JPL
678260	2017 QR_{9}	—	July 24, 2017	Haleakala	Pan-STARRS 1	615	1.1 km	MPC · JPL
678261	2017 QO_{12}	—	December 20, 2004	Kitt Peak	Spacewatch	·	750 m	MPC · JPL
678262	2017 QZ_{14}	—	October 31, 1999	Kitt Peak	Spacewatch	MAS	510 m	MPC · JPL
678263	2017 QP_{17}	—	August 20, 2017	WISE	WISE	APO	430 m	MPC · JPL
678264	2017 QJ_{19}	—	August 15, 2017	Haleakala	Pan-STARRS 1	·	1.8 km	MPC · JPL
678265	2017 QP_{19}	—	July 15, 2013	Haleakala	Pan-STARRS 1	·	930 m	MPC · JPL
678266	2017 QB_{21}	—	July 26, 2017	Haleakala	Pan-STARRS 1	·	750 m	MPC · JPL
678267	2017 QM_{24}	—	October 7, 2005	Mauna Kea	A. Boattini	·	1.6 km	MPC · JPL
678268	2017 QN_{37}	—	September 28, 2003	Kitt Peak	Spacewatch	NYS	880 m	MPC · JPL
678269	2017 QC_{39}	—	July 27, 2017	Haleakala	Pan-STARRS 1	·	1.4 km	MPC · JPL
678270	2017 QP_{39}	—	April 15, 2008	Mount Lemmon	Mount Lemmon Survey	·	830 m	MPC · JPL
678271	2017 QU_{40}	—	March 16, 2012	Mount Lemmon	Mount Lemmon Survey	·	1.0 km	MPC · JPL
678272	2017 QF_{42}	—	September 11, 2007	Dauban	Kugel, C. R. F.	EOS	2.1 km	MPC · JPL
678273	2017 QT_{46}	—	October 3, 2013	Haleakala	Pan-STARRS 1	NEM	1.7 km	MPC · JPL
678274	2017 QX_{46}	—	January 27, 2012	Mount Lemmon	Mount Lemmon Survey	MAS	590 m	MPC · JPL
678275	2017 QL_{48}	—	January 28, 2007	Mount Lemmon	Mount Lemmon Survey	·	1.0 km	MPC · JPL
678276	2017 QV_{50}	—	March 4, 2016	Haleakala	Pan-STARRS 1	·	2.2 km	MPC · JPL
678277	2017 QU_{51}	—	January 17, 2007	Kitt Peak	Spacewatch	·	890 m	MPC · JPL
678278	2017 QO_{52}	—	February 16, 2015	Haleakala	Pan-STARRS 1	·	1.8 km	MPC · JPL
678279	2017 QR_{52}	—	March 21, 2009	Mount Lemmon	Mount Lemmon Survey	MAS	640 m	MPC · JPL
678280	2017 QL_{53}	—	August 7, 2013	Kitt Peak	Spacewatch	·	920 m	MPC · JPL
678281	2017 QM_{53}	—	July 5, 2017	Haleakala	Pan-STARRS 1	·	840 m	MPC · JPL
678282	2017 QQ_{53}	—	April 3, 2008	Kitt Peak	Spacewatch	·	1.2 km	MPC · JPL
678283	2017 QP_{54}	—	March 9, 2006	Kitt Peak	Spacewatch	·	650 m	MPC · JPL
678284	2017 QT_{54}	—	June 20, 2013	Haleakala	Pan-STARRS 1	·	1.1 km	MPC · JPL
678285	2017 QD_{56}	—	October 11, 2006	Kitt Peak	Spacewatch	MAS	560 m	MPC · JPL
678286	2017 QL_{56}	—	November 17, 2009	Mount Lemmon	Mount Lemmon Survey	·	1.5 km	MPC · JPL
678287	2017 QW_{60}	—	August 10, 2008	Črni Vrh	Skvarč, J.	·	2.6 km	MPC · JPL
678288	2017 QR_{63}	—	July 25, 2017	Haleakala	Pan-STARRS 1	·	1.3 km	MPC · JPL
678289	2017 QO_{64}	—	January 18, 2015	Kitt Peak	Spacewatch	·	1.5 km	MPC · JPL
678290	2017 QZ_{64}	—	April 12, 2016	Haleakala	Pan-STARRS 1	·	1.5 km	MPC · JPL
678291	2017 QE_{65}	—	November 20, 2007	Mount Lemmon	Mount Lemmon Survey	·	1.8 km	MPC · JPL
678292	2017 QG_{65}	—	March 16, 2007	Kitt Peak	Spacewatch	·	1.6 km	MPC · JPL
678293	2017 QP_{66}	—	September 12, 2010	La Sagra	OAM	·	770 m	MPC · JPL
678294	2017 QT_{67}	—	August 22, 2017	Haleakala	Pan-STARRS 1	·	1.9 km	MPC · JPL
678295	2017 QE_{69}	—	August 31, 2017	Haleakala	Pan-STARRS 1	·	2.1 km	MPC · JPL
678296	2017 QH_{71}	—	August 24, 2017	Haleakala	Pan-STARRS 1	·	1.4 km	MPC · JPL
678297	2017 QC_{79}	—	August 22, 2017	Haleakala	Pan-STARRS 1	·	1.8 km	MPC · JPL
678298	2017 QX_{85}	—	August 31, 2017	Haleakala	Pan-STARRS 1	·	1.3 km	MPC · JPL
678299	2017 QF_{92}	—	August 31, 2017	Haleakala	Pan-STARRS 1	·	1.3 km	MPC · JPL
678300 Herbertcouriol	2017 QM_{92}	Herbertcouriol	August 29, 2017	Oukaïmeden	M.Ory	·	1.2 km	MPC · JPL

== 678301–678400 ==
back to top

Designation			Discovery			Properties		Ref
Permanent	Provisional	Named after	Date	Site	Discoverer(s)	Category	Diam.	Ref
678301	2017 QC_{93}	—	February 8, 2011	Mount Lemmon	Mount Lemmon Survey	·	980 m	MPC · JPL
678302	2017 QD_{96}	—	August 17, 2017	Haleakala	Pan-STARRS 1	PAD	1.3 km	MPC · JPL
678303	2017 QO_{97}	—	August 24, 2017	Haleakala	Pan-STARRS 1	KOR	930 m	MPC · JPL
678304	2017 QZ_{102}	—	August 18, 2017	Haleakala	Pan-STARRS 1	·	2.0 km	MPC · JPL
678305	2017 QS_{103}	—	August 23, 2017	Haleakala	Pan-STARRS 1	H	410 m	MPC · JPL
678306	2017 QA_{113}	—	July 29, 2017	Haleakala	Pan-STARRS 1	·	1.6 km	MPC · JPL
678307	2017 QC_{118}	—	March 28, 2016	Cerro Tololo-DECam	DECam	·	1.1 km	MPC · JPL
678308	2017 QZ_{121}	—	July 29, 2008	Kitt Peak	Spacewatch	·	1.7 km	MPC · JPL
678309	2017 QB_{124}	—	August 24, 2017	Haleakala	Pan-STARRS 1	KOR	1.1 km	MPC · JPL
678310	2017 QX_{126}	—	August 22, 2017	Haleakala	Pan-STARRS 1	·	1.1 km	MPC · JPL
678311	2017 QZ_{143}	—	January 18, 2015	Haleakala	Pan-STARRS 1	·	1.5 km	MPC · JPL
678312	2017 QS_{158}	—	January 20, 2015	Haleakala	Pan-STARRS 1	HOF	2.1 km	MPC · JPL
678313	2017 RJ	—	February 5, 2011	Haleakala	Pan-STARRS 1	·	1.2 km	MPC · JPL
678314	2017 RQ	—	January 20, 2015	Haleakala	Pan-STARRS 1	·	1.2 km	MPC · JPL
678315	2017 RA_{1}	—	December 2, 2015	Haleakala	Pan-STARRS 1	H	500 m	MPC · JPL
678316	2017 RB_{1}	—	December 8, 2015	Haleakala	Pan-STARRS 1	H	500 m	MPC · JPL
678317	2017 RH_{1}	—	December 4, 2015	Haleakala	Pan-STARRS 1	H	440 m	MPC · JPL
678318	2017 RE_{8}	—	August 16, 2017	Haleakala	Pan-STARRS 1	·	1.9 km	MPC · JPL
678319	2017 RN_{9}	—	September 14, 2017	Haleakala	Pan-STARRS 1	·	1.5 km	MPC · JPL
678320	2017 RB_{13}	—	February 16, 2015	Haleakala	Pan-STARRS 1	·	1.4 km	MPC · JPL
678321	2017 RJ_{17}	—	August 24, 2017	Haleakala	Pan-STARRS 1	EUN	900 m	MPC · JPL
678322	2017 RK_{18}	—	September 29, 2001	Palomar	NEAT	·	2.2 km	MPC · JPL
678323	2017 RN_{19}	—	August 31, 2017	Mount Lemmon	Mount Lemmon Survey	·	1.9 km	MPC · JPL
678324	2017 RM_{20}	—	October 1, 2008	Mount Lemmon	Mount Lemmon Survey	·	1.2 km	MPC · JPL
678325	2017 RR_{20}	—	July 27, 2017	Haleakala	Pan-STARRS 1	·	1.6 km	MPC · JPL
678326	2017 RG_{21}	—	January 16, 2015	Haleakala	Pan-STARRS 1	·	1.5 km	MPC · JPL
678327	2017 RR_{21}	—	December 21, 2006	Kitt Peak	Spacewatch	NYS	970 m	MPC · JPL
678328	2017 RU_{21}	—	April 13, 2012	Haleakala	Pan-STARRS 1	EUN	1.2 km	MPC · JPL
678329	2017 RE_{24}	—	April 4, 2008	Mount Lemmon	Mount Lemmon Survey	KON	1.9 km	MPC · JPL
678330	2017 RF_{24}	—	July 30, 2008	Dauban	Kugel, C. R. F.	·	1.6 km	MPC · JPL
678331	2017 RO_{24}	—	August 25, 2012	Kitt Peak	Spacewatch	·	1.2 km	MPC · JPL
678332	2017 RJ_{26}	—	August 10, 2004	Campo Imperatore	CINEOS	·	1.4 km	MPC · JPL
678333	2017 RE_{28}	—	October 28, 2008	Mount Lemmon	Mount Lemmon Survey	·	1.8 km	MPC · JPL
678334	2017 RX_{29}	—	July 30, 2017	Haleakala	Pan-STARRS 1	·	1.6 km	MPC · JPL
678335	2017 RE_{31}	—	January 21, 2015	Haleakala	Pan-STARRS 1	MRX	830 m	MPC · JPL
678336	2017 RD_{32}	—	September 26, 2008	Kitt Peak	Spacewatch	HOF	2.0 km	MPC · JPL
678337	2017 RG_{33}	—	October 3, 2013	Kitt Peak	Spacewatch	·	1.2 km	MPC · JPL
678338	2017 RB_{38}	—	August 18, 2006	Kitt Peak	Spacewatch	·	2.1 km	MPC · JPL
678339	2017 RV_{38}	—	December 21, 2006	Mount Lemmon	Mount Lemmon Survey	·	700 m	MPC · JPL
678340	2017 RT_{41}	—	January 26, 2006	Kitt Peak	Spacewatch	NEM	2.3 km	MPC · JPL
678341	2017 RR_{44}	—	January 22, 2015	Haleakala	Pan-STARRS 1	·	1.5 km	MPC · JPL
678342	2017 RU_{44}	—	April 15, 2012	Haleakala	Pan-STARRS 1	·	830 m	MPC · JPL
678343	2017 RW_{44}	—	July 27, 2017	Haleakala	Pan-STARRS 1	·	1.1 km	MPC · JPL
678344	2017 RA_{45}	—	September 18, 2009	Kitt Peak	Spacewatch	·	1.0 km	MPC · JPL
678345	2017 RW_{48}	—	November 8, 2008	Kitt Peak	Spacewatch	KOR	1.2 km	MPC · JPL
678346	2017 RT_{49}	—	February 8, 2002	Kitt Peak	Spacewatch	·	1.4 km	MPC · JPL
678347	2017 RB_{53}	—	August 22, 2017	Haleakala	Pan-STARRS 1	EOS	1.4 km	MPC · JPL
678348	2017 RS_{53}	—	October 7, 2008	Mount Lemmon	Mount Lemmon Survey	·	1.4 km	MPC · JPL
678349	2017 RW_{55}	—	August 23, 2003	Cerro Tololo	Deep Ecliptic Survey	HOF	2.0 km	MPC · JPL
678350	2017 RE_{56}	—	November 28, 2013	Mount Lemmon	Mount Lemmon Survey	·	1.7 km	MPC · JPL
678351	2017 RP_{56}	—	March 4, 2016	Haleakala	Pan-STARRS 1	·	1.1 km	MPC · JPL
678352	2017 RW_{56}	—	November 1, 2013	Kitt Peak	Spacewatch	·	1.3 km	MPC · JPL
678353	2017 RZ_{59}	—	March 26, 2001	Kitt Peak	Deep Ecliptic Survey	HOF	1.9 km	MPC · JPL
678354	2017 RB_{61}	—	October 21, 2003	Kitt Peak	Spacewatch	·	1.9 km	MPC · JPL
678355	2017 RD_{62}	—	October 1, 2008	Kitt Peak	Spacewatch	AGN	900 m	MPC · JPL
678356	2017 RR_{64}	—	January 18, 2008	Mount Lemmon	Mount Lemmon Survey	·	1.8 km	MPC · JPL
678357	2017 RW_{66}	—	February 18, 2015	Mount Lemmon	Mount Lemmon Survey	HNS	1.0 km	MPC · JPL
678358	2017 RD_{67}	—	August 6, 2008	La Sagra	OAM	·	1.5 km	MPC · JPL
678359	2017 RG_{67}	—	February 16, 2015	Haleakala	Pan-STARRS 1	NEM	1.7 km	MPC · JPL
678360	2017 RL_{67}	—	March 4, 2011	Mount Lemmon	Mount Lemmon Survey	·	1.3 km	MPC · JPL
678361	2017 RQ_{68}	—	September 12, 2007	Mount Lemmon	Mount Lemmon Survey	KOR	1.1 km	MPC · JPL
678362	2017 RT_{69}	—	September 15, 2010	Mount Lemmon	Mount Lemmon Survey	·	740 m	MPC · JPL
678363	2017 RN_{72}	—	November 4, 2013	Mount Lemmon	Mount Lemmon Survey	ADE	1.8 km	MPC · JPL
678364	2017 RK_{73}	—	September 28, 2008	Mount Lemmon	Mount Lemmon Survey	·	1.4 km	MPC · JPL
678365	2017 RS_{74}	—	September 14, 2017	Haleakala	Pan-STARRS 1	·	1.8 km	MPC · JPL
678366	2017 RP_{77}	—	January 28, 2015	Haleakala	Pan-STARRS 1	·	1.7 km	MPC · JPL
678367	2017 RL_{78}	—	February 18, 2015	Mount Lemmon	Mount Lemmon Survey	·	1.6 km	MPC · JPL
678368	2017 RM_{79}	—	January 17, 2015	Haleakala	Pan-STARRS 1	·	1.2 km	MPC · JPL
678369	2017 RH_{82}	—	December 29, 2008	Kitt Peak	Spacewatch	·	1.4 km	MPC · JPL
678370	2017 RF_{83}	—	September 19, 2006	Catalina	CSS	LIX	3.1 km	MPC · JPL
678371	2017 RS_{85}	—	March 16, 2015	Mount Lemmon	Mount Lemmon Survey	·	1.1 km	MPC · JPL
678372	2017 RX_{87}	—	September 17, 2003	Kitt Peak	Spacewatch	GEF	890 m	MPC · JPL
678373	2017 RZ_{88}	—	July 30, 2017	Haleakala	Pan-STARRS 1	(5)	1.0 km	MPC · JPL
678374	2017 RD_{91}	—	November 27, 2013	Haleakala	Pan-STARRS 1	·	1.3 km	MPC · JPL
678375	2017 RS_{92}	—	October 1, 2005	Kitt Peak	Spacewatch	·	1.2 km	MPC · JPL
678376	2017 RK_{93}	—	October 31, 2008	Catalina	CSS	GEF	1.2 km	MPC · JPL
678377	2017 RN_{93}	—	September 24, 2008	Kitt Peak	Spacewatch	AGN	900 m	MPC · JPL
678378	2017 RX_{93}	—	September 24, 2000	Socorro	LINEAR	EUN	1.0 km	MPC · JPL
678379	2017 RB_{95}	—	November 4, 2007	Kitt Peak	Spacewatch	·	610 m	MPC · JPL
678380	2017 RP_{97}	—	November 1, 2008	Mount Lemmon	Mount Lemmon Survey	AGN	860 m	MPC · JPL
678381	2017 RV_{100}	—	November 27, 2009	Mount Lemmon	Mount Lemmon Survey	·	1.0 km	MPC · JPL
678382	2017 RK_{101}	—	July 14, 2013	Haleakala	Pan-STARRS 1	·	1.4 km	MPC · JPL
678383	2017 RP_{103}	—	August 27, 2017	XuYi	PMO NEO Survey Program	DOR	1.9 km	MPC · JPL
678384	2017 RD_{104}	—	March 12, 2016	Haleakala	Pan-STARRS 1	PHO	640 m	MPC · JPL
678385	2017 RJ_{106}	—	February 5, 2011	Haleakala	Pan-STARRS 1	·	2.0 km	MPC · JPL
678386	2017 RW_{106}	—	October 24, 2008	Kitt Peak	Spacewatch	GEF	860 m	MPC · JPL
678387	2017 RH_{107}	—	August 24, 2012	Kitt Peak	Spacewatch	·	1.6 km	MPC · JPL
678388	2017 RC_{111}	—	September 14, 2017	Haleakala	Pan-STARRS 1	·	1.7 km	MPC · JPL
678389	2017 RY_{111}	—	September 3, 2017	Haleakala	Pan-STARRS 1	·	1.1 km	MPC · JPL
678390	2017 RU_{112}	—	September 3, 2017	Mount Lemmon	Mount Lemmon Survey	·	2.1 km	MPC · JPL
678391	2017 RH_{119}	—	April 18, 2015	Cerro Tololo-DECam	DECam	BRA	990 m	MPC · JPL
678392	2017 RQ_{120}	—	September 2, 2017	Haleakala	Pan-STARRS 1	·	1.4 km	MPC · JPL
678393	2017 RS_{120}	—	September 14, 2017	Haleakala	Pan-STARRS 1	·	1.9 km	MPC · JPL
678394	2017 RW_{120}	—	September 2, 2017	Haleakala	Pan-STARRS 1	·	1.6 km	MPC · JPL
678395	2017 RH_{121}	—	September 6, 2017	Haleakala	Pan-STARRS 1	·	860 m	MPC · JPL
678396	2017 RL_{121}	—	September 3, 2017	Haleakala	Pan-STARRS 1	·	1.3 km	MPC · JPL
678397	2017 RN_{121}	—	March 4, 2016	Haleakala	Pan-STARRS 1	·	1.2 km	MPC · JPL
678398	2017 RC_{123}	—	September 11, 2017	Haleakala	Pan-STARRS 1	·	1.3 km	MPC · JPL
678399	2017 RH_{123}	—	September 14, 2017	Haleakala	Pan-STARRS 1	·	1.2 km	MPC · JPL
678400	2017 RY_{123}	—	September 1, 2017	Mount Lemmon	Mount Lemmon Survey	HNS	1.2 km	MPC · JPL

== 678401–678500 ==
back to top

Designation			Discovery			Properties		Ref
Permanent	Provisional	Named after	Date	Site	Discoverer(s)	Category	Diam.	Ref
678401	2017 RP_{124}	—	September 14, 2017	Haleakala	Pan-STARRS 1	H	380 m	MPC · JPL
678402	2017 RW_{124}	—	October 9, 2008	Catalina	CSS	·	1.4 km	MPC · JPL
678403	2017 RL_{132}	—	August 31, 2017	Haleakala	Pan-STARRS 1	AST	1.3 km	MPC · JPL
678404	2017 RM_{134}	—	September 2, 2017	Haleakala	Pan-STARRS 1	·	1.3 km	MPC · JPL
678405	2017 RM_{139}	—	September 1, 2017	Haleakala	Pan-STARRS 1	(116763)	1.2 km	MPC · JPL
678406	2017 RX_{145}	—	September 15, 2017	Haleakala	Pan-STARRS 1	·	980 m	MPC · JPL
678407	2017 SA_{4}	—	September 16, 2017	Haleakala	Pan-STARRS 1	·	1.4 km	MPC · JPL
678408	2017 SE_{7}	—	October 31, 2013	Catalina	CSS	·	1.2 km	MPC · JPL
678409	2017 SU_{9}	—	August 21, 2003	Palomar	NEAT	·	1.9 km	MPC · JPL
678410	2017 SA_{16}	—	April 15, 2012	Haleakala	Pan-STARRS 1	·	1.5 km	MPC · JPL
678411	2017 SC_{19}	—	April 28, 2014	Cerro Tololo-DECam	DECam	H	360 m	MPC · JPL
678412	2017 SD_{19}	—	December 13, 2015	Haleakala	Pan-STARRS 1	H	430 m	MPC · JPL
678413	2017 SV_{20}	—	September 26, 2017	Haleakala	Pan-STARRS 1	APO · PHA	630 m	MPC · JPL
678414	2017 SR_{21}	—	September 6, 2008	Mount Lemmon	Mount Lemmon Survey	·	1.6 km	MPC · JPL
678415	2017 SY_{23}	—	March 4, 2016	Haleakala	Pan-STARRS 1	·	1.2 km	MPC · JPL
678416	2017 SC_{26}	—	September 22, 2017	Haleakala	Pan-STARRS 1	HOF	1.8 km	MPC · JPL
678417	2017 SQ_{28}	—	July 30, 2017	Haleakala	Pan-STARRS 1	·	1.6 km	MPC · JPL
678418	2017 SP_{29}	—	September 7, 2004	Palomar	NEAT	·	1.2 km	MPC · JPL
678419	2017 SQ_{29}	—	September 28, 2008	Catalina	CSS	·	1.2 km	MPC · JPL
678420	2017 ST_{29}	—	September 22, 2017	Haleakala	Pan-STARRS 1	·	1.3 km	MPC · JPL
678421	2017 SC_{30}	—	May 1, 2016	Cerro Tololo-DECam	DECam	·	1.4 km	MPC · JPL
678422	2017 SM_{30}	—	September 15, 2007	Kitt Peak	Spacewatch	·	1.6 km	MPC · JPL
678423	2017 SB_{31}	—	November 24, 2006	Kitt Peak	Spacewatch	MAS	820 m	MPC · JPL
678424	2017 SN_{32}	—	January 20, 2015	Mount Lemmon	Mount Lemmon Survey	·	1.2 km	MPC · JPL
678425	2017 SX_{33}	—	July 13, 2013	Haleakala	Pan-STARRS 1	EUN	1.0 km	MPC · JPL
678426	2017 SM_{36}	—	August 8, 2004	Socorro	LINEAR	·	1.3 km	MPC · JPL
678427	2017 SW_{39}	—	September 16, 2012	Catalina	CSS	BRA	1.3 km	MPC · JPL
678428	2017 SE_{41}	—	May 18, 2005	Palomar	NEAT	V	690 m	MPC · JPL
678429	2017 SX_{41}	—	September 2, 2017	Haleakala	Pan-STARRS 1	H	410 m	MPC · JPL
678430	2017 SY_{41}	—	September 26, 2017	Haleakala	Pan-STARRS 1	·	1.3 km	MPC · JPL
678431	2017 SE_{42}	—	June 10, 2007	Kitt Peak	Spacewatch	·	1.7 km	MPC · JPL
678432	2017 SS_{42}	—	August 1, 2017	Haleakala	Pan-STARRS 1	·	910 m	MPC · JPL
678433	2017 SF_{46}	—	February 3, 2016	Haleakala	Pan-STARRS 1	·	1.1 km	MPC · JPL
678434	2017 SX_{46}	—	January 19, 2015	Mount Lemmon	Mount Lemmon Survey	·	1.4 km	MPC · JPL
678435	2017 SH_{48}	—	January 22, 2015	Haleakala	Pan-STARRS 1	·	1.4 km	MPC · JPL
678436	2017 SP_{48}	—	October 11, 2005	Kitt Peak	Spacewatch	·	770 m	MPC · JPL
678437	2017 SZ_{49}	—	August 24, 2017	Haleakala	Pan-STARRS 1	·	1.5 km	MPC · JPL
678438	2017 SH_{50}	—	October 25, 2013	Mount Lemmon	Mount Lemmon Survey	·	1.2 km	MPC · JPL
678439	2017 SY_{50}	—	August 24, 2017	Haleakala	Pan-STARRS 1	·	1.3 km	MPC · JPL
678440	2017 SM_{54}	—	May 3, 2016	Mount Lemmon	Mount Lemmon Survey	·	810 m	MPC · JPL
678441	2017 SK_{56}	—	December 7, 2013	Mount Lemmon	Mount Lemmon Survey	·	1.5 km	MPC · JPL
678442	2017 SY_{56}	—	March 10, 2016	Haleakala	Pan-STARRS 1	·	1.7 km	MPC · JPL
678443	2017 SN_{59}	—	December 28, 2013	Kitt Peak	Spacewatch	GEF	890 m	MPC · JPL
678444	2017 SL_{60}	—	March 28, 2011	Kitt Peak	Spacewatch	H	530 m	MPC · JPL
678445	2017 SV_{61}	—	April 3, 2016	Haleakala	Pan-STARRS 1	·	1.3 km	MPC · JPL
678446	2017 SO_{62}	—	September 24, 2008	Kitt Peak	Spacewatch	HOF	2.1 km	MPC · JPL
678447	2017 SG_{65}	—	October 30, 2007	Kitt Peak	Spacewatch	·	1.8 km	MPC · JPL
678448	2017 SN_{65}	—	August 1, 2017	Haleakala	Pan-STARRS 1	·	1.4 km	MPC · JPL
678449	2017 SQ_{65}	—	November 7, 2008	Mount Lemmon	Mount Lemmon Survey	·	1.9 km	MPC · JPL
678450	2017 SW_{69}	—	January 25, 2006	Kitt Peak	Spacewatch	·	1.5 km	MPC · JPL
678451	2017 SQ_{73}	—	April 20, 2007	Mount Lemmon	Mount Lemmon Survey	·	1.6 km	MPC · JPL
678452	2017 SH_{75}	—	November 1, 2013	Mount Lemmon	Mount Lemmon Survey	·	1.3 km	MPC · JPL
678453	2017 SS_{75}	—	September 28, 2009	Mount Lemmon	Mount Lemmon Survey	·	820 m	MPC · JPL
678454	2017 SX_{75}	—	October 19, 2008	Kitt Peak	Spacewatch	·	1.4 km	MPC · JPL
678455	2017 SP_{78}	—	April 9, 2010	Mount Lemmon	Mount Lemmon Survey	·	1.2 km	MPC · JPL
678456	2017 SW_{80}	—	March 7, 2016	Haleakala	Pan-STARRS 1	·	1.2 km	MPC · JPL
678457	2017 SG_{81}	—	September 6, 2008	Kitt Peak	Spacewatch	·	1.3 km	MPC · JPL
678458	2017 SO_{81}	—	August 31, 2017	Haleakala	Pan-STARRS 1	NEM	1.7 km	MPC · JPL
678459	2017 SC_{82}	—	October 1, 2005	Kitt Peak	Spacewatch	·	960 m	MPC · JPL
678460	2017 SY_{84}	—	November 9, 2013	Mount Lemmon	Mount Lemmon Survey	(5)	900 m	MPC · JPL
678461	2017 SL_{85}	—	April 2, 2011	Mount Lemmon	Mount Lemmon Survey	·	1.5 km	MPC · JPL
678462	2017 SW_{87}	—	September 17, 2017	Haleakala	Pan-STARRS 1	HOF	1.9 km	MPC · JPL
678463	2017 SB_{92}	—	April 27, 2008	Mount Lemmon	Mount Lemmon Survey	·	1.1 km	MPC · JPL
678464	2017 SE_{93}	—	November 28, 2013	Mount Lemmon	Mount Lemmon Survey	AEO	880 m	MPC · JPL
678465	2017 SL_{93}	—	April 2, 2009	Kitt Peak	Spacewatch	V	500 m	MPC · JPL
678466	2017 SP_{95}	—	March 16, 2015	Mount Lemmon	Mount Lemmon Survey	EOS	1.4 km	MPC · JPL
678467	2017 SF_{101}	—	October 2, 2013	Haleakala	Pan-STARRS 1	·	850 m	MPC · JPL
678468	2017 SO_{101}	—	September 2, 2017	Haleakala	Pan-STARRS 1	·	1.8 km	MPC · JPL
678469	2017 SQ_{101}	—	September 12, 2013	Catalina	CSS	PHO	850 m	MPC · JPL
678470	2017 SJ_{102}	—	August 5, 2013	ESA OGS	ESA OGS	NYS	1.0 km	MPC · JPL
678471 Piermichelbergé	2017 SM_{102}	Piermichelbergé	September 19, 2017	Oukaïmeden	M. Ory	·	1.6 km	MPC · JPL
678472	2017 SE_{103}	—	October 30, 2008	Mount Lemmon	Mount Lemmon Survey	·	1.9 km	MPC · JPL
678473	2017 SC_{104}	—	September 15, 2006	Kitt Peak	Spacewatch	TIR	2.3 km	MPC · JPL
678474	2017 SZ_{105}	—	April 18, 2015	Cerro Tololo-DECam	DECam	·	1.5 km	MPC · JPL
678475	2017 SA_{106}	—	October 18, 2003	Kitt Peak	Spacewatch	·	1.8 km	MPC · JPL
678476	2017 SG_{108}	—	March 2, 2011	Mount Lemmon	Mount Lemmon Survey	EUN	940 m	MPC · JPL
678477	2017 ST_{111}	—	May 21, 2012	Mount Lemmon	Mount Lemmon Survey	·	1.1 km	MPC · JPL
678478	2017 SX_{115}	—	July 18, 2013	Haleakala	Pan-STARRS 1	GEF	1.2 km	MPC · JPL
678479	2017 SD_{116}	—	September 24, 2000	Socorro	LINEAR	·	1.3 km	MPC · JPL
678480	2017 SM_{116}	—	October 11, 2007	Mount Lemmon	Mount Lemmon Survey	·	1.4 km	MPC · JPL
678481	2017 SC_{117}	—	April 7, 2005	Kitt Peak	Spacewatch	·	980 m	MPC · JPL
678482	2017 SO_{125}	—	March 27, 2011	Mount Lemmon	Mount Lemmon Survey	·	1.4 km	MPC · JPL
678483	2017 SQ_{126}	—	December 30, 2013	Kitt Peak	Spacewatch	·	1.3 km	MPC · JPL
678484	2017 SV_{126}	—	January 16, 2005	Mauna Kea	P. A. Wiegert	·	1.4 km	MPC · JPL
678485	2017 SW_{129}	—	July 14, 2013	Haleakala	Pan-STARRS 1	MAS	580 m	MPC · JPL
678486	2017 SN_{130}	—	October 5, 2002	Kitt Peak	Spacewatch	·	930 m	MPC · JPL
678487	2017 SN_{131}	—	September 30, 2006	Mount Lemmon	Mount Lemmon Survey	LIX	2.8 km	MPC · JPL
678488	2017 SB_{132}	—	November 9, 2013	Haleakala	Pan-STARRS 1	·	1.4 km	MPC · JPL
678489	2017 SS_{132}	—	September 30, 2017	Mount Lemmon	Mount Lemmon Survey	·	2.9 km	MPC · JPL
678490	2017 SU_{132}	—	September 26, 2017	Haleakala	Pan-STARRS 1	EOS	1.5 km	MPC · JPL
678491	2017 SB_{133}	—	September 19, 2017	Haleakala	Pan-STARRS 1	H	350 m	MPC · JPL
678492	2017 SH_{133}	—	September 22, 2017	Haleakala	Pan-STARRS 1	·	2.1 km	MPC · JPL
678493	2017 SJ_{135}	—	May 20, 2015	Cerro Tololo-DECam	DECam	·	2.1 km	MPC · JPL
678494	2017 SW_{135}	—	September 23, 2017	Haleakala	Pan-STARRS 1	·	1.5 km	MPC · JPL
678495	2017 SD_{136}	—	August 6, 2008	La Sagra	OAM	·	1.2 km	MPC · JPL
678496	2017 SJ_{136}	—	November 6, 2013	Catalina	CSS	·	940 m	MPC · JPL
678497	2017 SQ_{136}	—	September 30, 2017	Haleakala	Pan-STARRS 1	·	1.7 km	MPC · JPL
678498	2017 SW_{136}	—	September 24, 2017	Haleakala	Pan-STARRS 1	·	1.5 km	MPC · JPL
678499	2017 SE_{137}	—	September 28, 2017	Haleakala	Pan-STARRS 1	(5)	640 m	MPC · JPL
678500	2017 SW_{137}	—	September 18, 2017	Haleakala	Pan-STARRS 1	·	1.4 km	MPC · JPL

== 678501–678600 ==
back to top

Designation			Discovery			Properties		Ref
Permanent	Provisional	Named after	Date	Site	Discoverer(s)	Category	Diam.	Ref
678501	2017 SU_{139}	—	September 19, 2017	Haleakala	Pan-STARRS 1	·	2.3 km	MPC · JPL
678502	2017 SF_{140}	—	April 23, 2014	Cerro Tololo-DECam	DECam	·	1.8 km	MPC · JPL
678503	2017 ST_{141}	—	December 24, 2013	Mount Lemmon	Mount Lemmon Survey	(5)	960 m	MPC · JPL
678504	2017 SZ_{141}	—	September 22, 2017	Haleakala	Pan-STARRS 1	·	1.9 km	MPC · JPL
678505	2017 SQ_{143}	—	September 29, 2017	Kitt Peak	Spacewatch	·	1.7 km	MPC · JPL
678506	2017 SB_{144}	—	September 24, 2017	Haleakala	Pan-STARRS 1	·	1.8 km	MPC · JPL
678507	2017 SX_{149}	—	September 21, 2017	Catalina	CSS	·	930 m	MPC · JPL
678508	2017 SS_{151}	—	September 24, 2017	Haleakala	Pan-STARRS 1	·	1.3 km	MPC · JPL
678509	2017 SF_{153}	—	November 27, 2013	Haleakala	Pan-STARRS 1	·	720 m	MPC · JPL
678510	2017 SF_{154}	—	September 21, 2017	Haleakala	Pan-STARRS 1	·	1.1 km	MPC · JPL
678511	2017 SF_{155}	—	September 16, 2017	Haleakala	Pan-STARRS 1	·	880 m	MPC · JPL
678512	2017 ST_{158}	—	September 30, 2017	Haleakala	Pan-STARRS 1	·	1.5 km	MPC · JPL
678513	2017 SB_{183}	—	September 22, 2017	Haleakala	Pan-STARRS 1	MAR	850 m	MPC · JPL
678514	2017 SK_{186}	—	October 14, 2013	Kitt Peak	Spacewatch	·	1.2 km	MPC · JPL
678515	2017 SM_{188}	—	September 23, 2017	Haleakala	Pan-STARRS 1	H	340 m	MPC · JPL
678516	2017 SF_{189}	—	September 30, 2017	Mount Lemmon	Mount Lemmon Survey	·	2.5 km	MPC · JPL
678517	2017 SH_{189}	—	September 21, 2017	Haleakala	Pan-STARRS 1	·	1.7 km	MPC · JPL
678518	2017 SO_{189}	—	September 19, 2017	Haleakala	Pan-STARRS 1	·	1.8 km	MPC · JPL
678519	2017 SU_{189}	—	September 16, 2017	Haleakala	Pan-STARRS 1	·	1.7 km	MPC · JPL
678520	2017 SY_{192}	—	May 22, 2015	Cerro Tololo-DECam	DECam	·	1.6 km	MPC · JPL
678521	2017 SR_{195}	—	September 19, 2017	Haleakala	Pan-STARRS 1	AST	1.2 km	MPC · JPL
678522	2017 SR_{196}	—	September 23, 2017	Haleakala	Pan-STARRS 1	KOR	1.0 km	MPC · JPL
678523	2017 SC_{198}	—	September 23, 2017	Haleakala	Pan-STARRS 1	·	1.3 km	MPC · JPL
678524	2017 SE_{198}	—	September 23, 2017	Haleakala	Pan-STARRS 1	HOF	2.0 km	MPC · JPL
678525	2017 SX_{198}	—	September 24, 2017	Haleakala	Pan-STARRS 1	·	1.9 km	MPC · JPL
678526	2017 SY_{198}	—	September 22, 2017	Haleakala	Pan-STARRS 1	·	1.0 km	MPC · JPL
678527	2017 SC_{199}	—	September 30, 2017	Haleakala	Pan-STARRS 1	·	1.3 km	MPC · JPL
678528	2017 SF_{199}	—	September 23, 2017	Haleakala	Pan-STARRS 1	·	1.6 km	MPC · JPL
678529	2017 SV_{199}	—	September 17, 2017	Haleakala	Pan-STARRS 1	·	1.2 km	MPC · JPL
678530	2017 SH_{200}	—	September 24, 2017	Mount Lemmon	Mount Lemmon Survey	·	1.2 km	MPC · JPL
678531	2017 SM_{201}	—	April 18, 2015	Cerro Tololo-DECam	DECam	AGN	920 m	MPC · JPL
678532	2017 SN_{201}	—	September 26, 2017	Haleakala	Pan-STARRS 1	·	860 m	MPC · JPL
678533	2017 SJ_{202}	—	September 30, 2017	Haleakala	Pan-STARRS 1	·	2.3 km	MPC · JPL
678534	2017 SC_{203}	—	April 18, 2015	Cerro Tololo-DECam	DECam	HOF	1.9 km	MPC · JPL
678535	2017 SG_{203}	—	September 30, 2017	Haleakala	Pan-STARRS 1	·	1.7 km	MPC · JPL
678536	2017 SS_{203}	—	September 19, 2017	Haleakala	Pan-STARRS 1	·	1.1 km	MPC · JPL
678537	2017 SL_{204}	—	September 17, 2017	Haleakala	Pan-STARRS 1	HNS	770 m	MPC · JPL
678538	2017 SM_{204}	—	September 19, 2017	Haleakala	Pan-STARRS 1	·	1.3 km	MPC · JPL
678539	2017 SB_{206}	—	September 27, 2017	Haleakala	Pan-STARRS 1	KON	1.6 km	MPC · JPL
678540	2017 SM_{207}	—	September 30, 2017	Haleakala	Pan-STARRS 1	·	1.7 km	MPC · JPL
678541	2017 SA_{208}	—	September 25, 2017	Haleakala	Pan-STARRS 1	EUN	800 m	MPC · JPL
678542	2017 SK_{208}	—	September 25, 2017	Haleakala	Pan-STARRS 1	RAF	710 m	MPC · JPL
678543	2017 SL_{208}	—	September 26, 2017	Haleakala	Pan-STARRS 1	·	1.5 km	MPC · JPL
678544	2017 SG_{209}	—	September 30, 2017	Haleakala	Pan-STARRS 1	·	1.3 km	MPC · JPL
678545	2017 SF_{210}	—	April 19, 2015	Cerro Tololo-DECam	DECam	KOR	960 m	MPC · JPL
678546	2017 SP_{210}	—	September 30, 2017	Haleakala	Pan-STARRS 1	·	1.5 km	MPC · JPL
678547	2017 SU_{210}	—	September 19, 2017	Haleakala	Pan-STARRS 1	HOF	2.0 km	MPC · JPL
678548	2017 SV_{210}	—	September 30, 2017	Haleakala	Pan-STARRS 1	·	1.4 km	MPC · JPL
678549	2017 SX_{210}	—	September 30, 2017	Haleakala	Pan-STARRS 1	·	1.3 km	MPC · JPL
678550	2017 SD_{211}	—	September 24, 2017	Haleakala	Pan-STARRS 1	·	1.1 km	MPC · JPL
678551	2017 SB_{213}	—	September 23, 2017	Haleakala	Pan-STARRS 1	·	1.2 km	MPC · JPL
678552	2017 SO_{223}	—	April 19, 2015	Mount Lemmon	Mount Lemmon Survey	·	1.5 km	MPC · JPL
678553	2017 SB_{227}	—	September 17, 2017	Haleakala	Pan-STARRS 1	·	1.7 km	MPC · JPL
678554	2017 SW_{227}	—	September 26, 2017	Haleakala	Pan-STARRS 1	H	390 m	MPC · JPL
678555	2017 SA_{233}	—	August 28, 2013	Catalina	CSS	·	920 m	MPC · JPL
678556	2017 SE_{244}	—	September 24, 2017	Haleakala	Pan-STARRS 1	·	1.7 km	MPC · JPL
678557	2017 ST_{246}	—	April 18, 2015	Cerro Tololo-DECam	DECam	AST	1.3 km	MPC · JPL
678558	2017 SR_{247}	—	October 18, 2012	Haleakala	Pan-STARRS 1	·	1.4 km	MPC · JPL
678559	2017 SZ_{247}	—	April 3, 2016	Haleakala	Pan-STARRS 1	·	1.0 km	MPC · JPL
678560	2017 SR_{260}	—	September 19, 2017	Haleakala	Pan-STARRS 1	·	1.8 km	MPC · JPL
678561	2017 TD_{2}	—	February 5, 2016	Haleakala	Pan-STARRS 1	H	540 m	MPC · JPL
678562	2017 TA_{3}	—	January 14, 2016	Haleakala	Pan-STARRS 1	H	440 m	MPC · JPL
678563	2017 TO_{3}	—	May 5, 2008	Mount Lemmon	Mount Lemmon Survey	H	480 m	MPC · JPL
678564	2017 TM_{5}	—	October 3, 1999	Kitt Peak	Spacewatch	H	450 m	MPC · JPL
678565	2017 TZ_{7}	—	March 4, 2016	Haleakala	Pan-STARRS 1	·	1.1 km	MPC · JPL
678566	2017 TY_{8}	—	October 13, 2013	Mount Lemmon	Mount Lemmon Survey	(5)	1.1 km	MPC · JPL
678567	2017 TR_{10}	—	September 19, 2017	Haleakala	Pan-STARRS 1	·	1.0 km	MPC · JPL
678568	2017 TM_{11}	—	October 16, 2013	Mount Lemmon	Mount Lemmon Survey	·	1.1 km	MPC · JPL
678569	2017 TO_{11}	—	January 7, 2010	Mount Lemmon	Mount Lemmon Survey	·	1.3 km	MPC · JPL
678570	2017 TB_{14}	—	September 21, 2017	Haleakala	Pan-STARRS 1	526	2.1 km	MPC · JPL
678571	2017 TK_{14}	—	October 1, 2017	Mount Lemmon	Mount Lemmon Survey	·	1.8 km	MPC · JPL
678572	2017 TM_{14}	—	October 11, 2017	Haleakala	Pan-STARRS 1	·	1.8 km	MPC · JPL
678573	2017 TV_{14}	—	October 13, 2017	Mount Lemmon	Mount Lemmon Survey	EOS	1.2 km	MPC · JPL
678574	2017 TZ_{15}	—	October 1, 2017	Haleakala	Pan-STARRS 1	·	1.2 km	MPC · JPL
678575	2017 TU_{16}	—	October 2, 2017	Haleakala	Pan-STARRS 1	·	2.2 km	MPC · JPL
678576	2017 TU_{18}	—	May 20, 2015	Cerro Tololo-DECam	DECam	·	2.2 km	MPC · JPL
678577	2017 TK_{21}	—	April 19, 2015	Cerro Tololo-DECam	DECam	·	1.3 km	MPC · JPL
678578	2017 TG_{22}	—	September 24, 2017	Catalina	CSS	·	1.3 km	MPC · JPL
678579	2017 TG_{23}	—	October 12, 2017	Mount Lemmon	Mount Lemmon Survey	·	1.5 km	MPC · JPL
678580	2017 TO_{23}	—	April 6, 2008	Kitt Peak	Spacewatch	H	430 m	MPC · JPL
678581	2017 TD_{25}	—	September 19, 2017	Haleakala	Pan-STARRS 1	HOF	2.0 km	MPC · JPL
678582	2017 TE_{25}	—	September 17, 2017	Haleakala	Pan-STARRS 1	KOR	990 m	MPC · JPL
678583	2017 TN_{26}	—	September 17, 2017	Haleakala	Pan-STARRS 1	·	1.5 km	MPC · JPL
678584	2017 TS_{27}	—	October 13, 2017	Mount Lemmon	Mount Lemmon Survey	BRG	1.2 km	MPC · JPL
678585	2017 TD_{28}	—	October 13, 2017	Mount Lemmon	Mount Lemmon Survey	EOS	1.2 km	MPC · JPL
678586	2017 TN_{29}	—	April 19, 2015	Cerro Tololo-DECam	DECam	·	1.3 km	MPC · JPL
678587	2017 TQ_{37}	—	October 11, 2017	Mount Lemmon	Mount Lemmon Survey	·	1.2 km	MPC · JPL
678588	2017 UM	—	September 16, 2004	Socorro	LINEAR	·	1.5 km	MPC · JPL
678589	2017 UM_{3}	—	August 3, 2017	Haleakala	Pan-STARRS 1	·	1.2 km	MPC · JPL
678590	2017 UE_{4}	—	July 29, 2006	Siding Spring	SSS	·	2.2 km	MPC · JPL
678591	2017 UU_{8}	—	July 29, 2003	Campo Imperatore	CINEOS	·	980 m	MPC · JPL
678592	2017 UO_{10}	—	November 10, 2013	Mount Lemmon	Mount Lemmon Survey	·	1.3 km	MPC · JPL
678593	2017 UM_{12}	—	September 23, 2008	Catalina	CSS	·	1.9 km	MPC · JPL
678594	2017 US_{13}	—	September 11, 2010	Mount Lemmon	Mount Lemmon Survey	·	940 m	MPC · JPL
678595	2017 UD_{15}	—	November 26, 2013	Mount Lemmon	Mount Lemmon Survey	(5)	1.1 km	MPC · JPL
678596	2017 UL_{15}	—	November 11, 2007	Mount Lemmon	Mount Lemmon Survey	·	1.7 km	MPC · JPL
678597	2017 UE_{17}	—	October 9, 2013	Mount Lemmon	Mount Lemmon Survey	·	1.3 km	MPC · JPL
678598	2017 UR_{18}	—	August 24, 2017	Haleakala	Pan-STARRS 1	H	290 m	MPC · JPL
678599	2017 UE_{20}	—	October 1, 2010	Vail-Jarnac	Glinos, T.	·	860 m	MPC · JPL
678600	2017 UQ_{21}	—	August 24, 2017	Haleakala	Pan-STARRS 1	·	1.0 km	MPC · JPL

== 678601–678700 ==
back to top

Designation			Discovery			Properties		Ref
Permanent	Provisional	Named after	Date	Site	Discoverer(s)	Category	Diam.	Ref
678601	2017 UT_{23}	—	May 24, 2011	Haleakala	Pan-STARRS 1	KOR	1.3 km	MPC · JPL
678602	2017 UZ_{24}	—	September 11, 2007	Kitt Peak	Spacewatch	·	1.6 km	MPC · JPL
678603	2017 UF_{29}	—	January 20, 2015	Haleakala	Pan-STARRS 1	NYS	910 m	MPC · JPL
678604	2017 UU_{30}	—	June 27, 2014	Haleakala	Pan-STARRS 1	H	400 m	MPC · JPL
678605	2017 UC_{32}	—	November 12, 2001	Kitt Peak	Spacewatch	·	2.4 km	MPC · JPL
678606	2017 UK_{34}	—	August 20, 2004	Kitt Peak	Spacewatch	·	1.1 km	MPC · JPL
678607	2017 UX_{34}	—	September 27, 2006	Mount Lemmon	Mount Lemmon Survey	T_{j} (2.97)	2.9 km	MPC · JPL
678608	2017 UN_{35}	—	December 29, 2014	Haleakala	Pan-STARRS 1	·	1.3 km	MPC · JPL
678609	2017 UY_{35}	—	September 21, 2017	Haleakala	Pan-STARRS 1	·	1.4 km	MPC · JPL
678610	2017 UK_{37}	—	October 2, 2003	Kitt Peak	Spacewatch	·	720 m	MPC · JPL
678611	2017 UD_{39}	—	October 8, 2007	Catalina	CSS	·	640 m	MPC · JPL
678612	2017 UL_{41}	—	September 25, 2011	Haleakala	Pan-STARRS 1	·	2.1 km	MPC · JPL
678613	2017 UN_{41}	—	October 22, 2012	Haleakala	Pan-STARRS 1	·	1.6 km	MPC · JPL
678614	2017 UT_{49}	—	August 2, 2011	Haleakala	Pan-STARRS 1	BRA	1.1 km	MPC · JPL
678615	2017 UV_{52}	—	May 19, 2015	Cerro Tololo-DECam	DECam	·	1.7 km	MPC · JPL
678616	2017 UW_{52}	—	April 23, 2014	Cerro Tololo-DECam	DECam	·	2.6 km	MPC · JPL
678617	2017 UH_{53}	—	October 22, 2017	Mount Lemmon	Mount Lemmon Survey	·	1.4 km	MPC · JPL
678618	2017 UN_{53}	—	May 20, 2015	Cerro Tololo-DECam	DECam	·	1.0 km	MPC · JPL
678619	2017 UF_{54}	—	April 18, 2015	Cerro Tololo-DECam	DECam	·	1.1 km	MPC · JPL
678620	2017 UP_{54}	—	April 23, 2014	Cerro Tololo-DECam	DECam	·	1.3 km	MPC · JPL
678621	2017 UU_{54}	—	April 23, 2014	Cerro Tololo-DECam	DECam	·	2.0 km	MPC · JPL
678622	2017 UX_{54}	—	October 20, 2017	Mount Lemmon	Mount Lemmon Survey	·	1.1 km	MPC · JPL
678623	2017 UA_{55}	—	October 29, 2017	Haleakala	Pan-STARRS 1	T_{j} (2.98)	3.0 km	MPC · JPL
678624	2017 UJ_{55}	—	October 19, 2017	GINOP-KHK, Piszkes	K. Sárneczky	·	1.1 km	MPC · JPL
678625	2017 UX_{55}	—	October 22, 2017	Mount Lemmon	Mount Lemmon Survey	·	870 m	MPC · JPL
678626	2017 UC_{56}	—	March 17, 2015	Haleakala	Pan-STARRS 1	·	1.8 km	MPC · JPL
678627	2017 US_{56}	—	October 9, 2005	Kitt Peak	Spacewatch	THB	1.7 km	MPC · JPL
678628	2017 UX_{56}	—	September 24, 2017	Haleakala	Pan-STARRS 1	·	1.8 km	MPC · JPL
678629	2017 UK_{59}	—	October 20, 2017	Mount Lemmon	Mount Lemmon Survey	·	1.2 km	MPC · JPL
678630	2017 UT_{59}	—	October 19, 2017	Haleakala	Pan-STARRS 1	·	2.3 km	MPC · JPL
678631	2017 UW_{59}	—	May 21, 2015	Cerro Tololo-DECam	DECam	·	1.4 km	MPC · JPL
678632	2017 UX_{59}	—	April 18, 2015	Cerro Tololo-DECam	DECam	EUN	1.0 km	MPC · JPL
678633	2017 UG_{60}	—	September 29, 2008	Mount Lemmon	Mount Lemmon Survey	·	1.3 km	MPC · JPL
678634	2017 UW_{61}	—	October 20, 2017	Mount Lemmon	Mount Lemmon Survey	·	1.0 km	MPC · JPL
678635	2017 UD_{62}	—	October 16, 2017	Catalina	CSS	·	1.2 km	MPC · JPL
678636	2017 UK_{63}	—	September 7, 2004	Kitt Peak	Spacewatch	·	930 m	MPC · JPL
678637	2017 UL_{63}	—	October 28, 2017	Mount Lemmon	Mount Lemmon Survey	BRG	1.2 km	MPC · JPL
678638	2017 UZ_{63}	—	September 22, 2017	Haleakala	Pan-STARRS 1	·	1.8 km	MPC · JPL
678639	2017 UD_{66}	—	October 30, 2017	Haleakala	Pan-STARRS 1	EOS	1.5 km	MPC · JPL
678640	2017 UQ_{67}	—	October 22, 2017	Mount Lemmon	Mount Lemmon Survey	·	890 m	MPC · JPL
678641	2017 UP_{68}	—	November 8, 1996	Kitt Peak	Spacewatch	·	900 m	MPC · JPL
678642	2017 UO_{70}	—	November 28, 2013	Mount Lemmon	Mount Lemmon Survey	·	1.1 km	MPC · JPL
678643	2017 UT_{70}	—	October 19, 2017	Mount Lemmon	Mount Lemmon Survey	·	2.2 km	MPC · JPL
678644	2017 UN_{72}	—	October 30, 2017	Haleakala	Pan-STARRS 1	·	2.2 km	MPC · JPL
678645	2017 UF_{78}	—	July 5, 2016	Haleakala	Pan-STARRS 1	·	1.5 km	MPC · JPL
678646	2017 UG_{79}	—	October 28, 2017	Mount Lemmon	Mount Lemmon Survey	·	1.8 km	MPC · JPL
678647	2017 UM_{82}	—	October 28, 2017	Mount Lemmon	Mount Lemmon Survey	·	1.7 km	MPC · JPL
678648	2017 UW_{84}	—	October 25, 2017	Mount Lemmon	Mount Lemmon Survey	·	1.9 km	MPC · JPL
678649	2017 UR_{85}	—	April 18, 2015	Cerro Tololo-DECam	DECam	·	1.7 km	MPC · JPL
678650	2017 UF_{87}	—	October 21, 2017	Mount Lemmon	Mount Lemmon Survey	·	1.4 km	MPC · JPL
678651	2017 UW_{88}	—	October 17, 2017	Mount Lemmon	Mount Lemmon Survey	BRA	1.1 km	MPC · JPL
678652	2017 UA_{91}	—	October 30, 2017	Haleakala	Pan-STARRS 1	·	980 m	MPC · JPL
678653	2017 UD_{93}	—	June 18, 2015	Haleakala	Pan-STARRS 1	·	1.7 km	MPC · JPL
678654	2017 UG_{93}	—	October 30, 2017	Haleakala	Pan-STARRS 1	·	1.2 km	MPC · JPL
678655	2017 UM_{93}	—	May 1, 2016	Haleakala	Pan-STARRS 1	·	1.2 km	MPC · JPL
678656	2017 UV_{93}	—	October 30, 2017	Haleakala	Pan-STARRS 1	·	1.1 km	MPC · JPL
678657	2017 UY_{93}	—	October 30, 2017	Haleakala	Pan-STARRS 1	KOR	990 m	MPC · JPL
678658	2017 UD_{94}	—	May 11, 2015	Mount Lemmon	Mount Lemmon Survey	KOR	980 m	MPC · JPL
678659	2017 US_{94}	—	October 20, 2017	Mount Lemmon	Mount Lemmon Survey	·	1.3 km	MPC · JPL
678660	2017 UA_{95}	—	October 28, 2017	Mount Lemmon	Mount Lemmon Survey	·	1.2 km	MPC · JPL
678661	2017 UC_{95}	—	October 27, 2017	Mount Lemmon	Mount Lemmon Survey	·	1.2 km	MPC · JPL
678662	2017 UH_{95}	—	September 22, 2017	Haleakala	Pan-STARRS 1	KON	1.7 km	MPC · JPL
678663	2017 UP_{95}	—	October 17, 2017	Mount Lemmon	Mount Lemmon Survey	ADE	1.5 km	MPC · JPL
678664	2017 UU_{95}	—	October 27, 2017	Haleakala	Pan-STARRS 1	·	1.4 km	MPC · JPL
678665	2017 UW_{95}	—	October 30, 2017	Haleakala	Pan-STARRS 1	·	1.3 km	MPC · JPL
678666	2017 UP_{96}	—	October 21, 2017	Mount Lemmon	Mount Lemmon Survey	EOS	1.2 km	MPC · JPL
678667	2017 US_{96}	—	October 24, 2017	Mount Lemmon	Mount Lemmon Survey	·	2.1 km	MPC · JPL
678668	2017 UO_{97}	—	October 28, 2017	Haleakala	Pan-STARRS 1	·	1.1 km	MPC · JPL
678669	2017 UU_{97}	—	May 21, 2015	Cerro Tololo-DECam	DECam	·	1.1 km	MPC · JPL
678670	2017 UV_{97}	—	May 20, 2015	Cerro Tololo	DECam	·	1.4 km	MPC · JPL
678671	2017 UM_{98}	—	October 29, 2017	Mount Lemmon	Mount Lemmon Survey	·	1.9 km	MPC · JPL
678672	2017 UN_{98}	—	October 28, 2017	Haleakala	Pan-STARRS 1	·	1.5 km	MPC · JPL
678673	2017 UR_{98}	—	April 18, 2015	Mount Lemmon	Mount Lemmon Survey	·	1.5 km	MPC · JPL
678674	2017 UT_{98}	—	October 28, 2017	Haleakala	Pan-STARRS 1	·	1.2 km	MPC · JPL
678675	2017 UB_{99}	—	October 18, 2017	Haleakala	Pan-STARRS 1	·	1.2 km	MPC · JPL
678676 Liepāja	2017 UK_{101}	Liepāja	October 23, 2017	Baldone	K. Černis, I. Eglītis	·	1.8 km	MPC · JPL
678677	2017 UT_{102}	—	October 29, 2017	Haleakala	Pan-STARRS 1	·	1.5 km	MPC · JPL
678678	2017 UZ_{102}	—	April 18, 2015	Cerro Tololo	DECam	·	1.8 km	MPC · JPL
678679	2017 UY_{103}	—	October 30, 2017	Haleakala	Pan-STARRS 1	·	2.2 km	MPC · JPL
678680	2017 UG_{104}	—	August 26, 2012	Haleakala	Pan-STARRS 1	NEM	1.6 km	MPC · JPL
678681	2017 UW_{104}	—	September 17, 2017	Haleakala	Pan-STARRS 1	WIT	840 m	MPC · JPL
678682	2017 UQ_{105}	—	October 28, 2017	Haleakala	Pan-STARRS 1	H	500 m	MPC · JPL
678683	2017 UU_{105}	—	October 23, 2017	Mount Lemmon	Mount Lemmon Survey	AGN	1.1 km	MPC · JPL
678684	2017 UV_{105}	—	October 30, 2017	Haleakala	Pan-STARRS 1	AST	1.3 km	MPC · JPL
678685	2017 US_{107}	—	October 30, 2017	Haleakala	Pan-STARRS 1	·	1.3 km	MPC · JPL
678686	2017 UA_{108}	—	October 28, 2017	Haleakala	Pan-STARRS 1	ADE	1.8 km	MPC · JPL
678687	2017 US_{108}	—	October 28, 2017	Haleakala	Pan-STARRS 1	·	1.3 km	MPC · JPL
678688	2017 UQ_{109}	—	October 27, 2017	Haleakala	Pan-STARRS 1	NEM	1.8 km	MPC · JPL
678689	2017 US_{109}	—	October 22, 2017	Mount Lemmon	Mount Lemmon Survey	·	1.9 km	MPC · JPL
678690	2017 UX_{110}	—	October 28, 2017	Haleakala	Pan-STARRS 1	·	2.0 km	MPC · JPL
678691	2017 UY_{110}	—	April 28, 2014	Cerro Tololo	DECam	·	1.7 km	MPC · JPL
678692	2017 UF_{111}	—	October 29, 2017	Haleakala	Pan-STARRS 1	·	620 m	MPC · JPL
678693	2017 UU_{113}	—	April 18, 2015	Cerro Tololo-DECam	DECam	·	1.3 km	MPC · JPL
678694	2017 UW_{113}	—	April 10, 2015	Mount Lemmon	Mount Lemmon Survey	·	1.5 km	MPC · JPL
678695	2017 UG_{118}	—	April 18, 2015	Cerro Tololo	DECam	·	1.4 km	MPC · JPL
678696	2017 UE_{130}	—	October 22, 2017	Haleakala	Pan-STARRS 1	·	1.6 km	MPC · JPL
678697	2017 UK_{136}	—	October 30, 2008	Kitt Peak	Spacewatch	·	1.9 km	MPC · JPL
678698	2017 UJ_{138}	—	October 23, 2017	Mount Lemmon	Mount Lemmon Survey	·	1.6 km	MPC · JPL
678699	2017 UY_{146}	—	May 20, 2015	Cerro Tololo	DECam	·	1.3 km	MPC · JPL
678700	2017 UE_{157}	—	October 29, 2017	Haleakala	Pan-STARRS 1	·	1.2 km	MPC · JPL

== 678701–678800 ==
back to top

Designation			Discovery			Properties		Ref
Permanent	Provisional	Named after	Date	Site	Discoverer(s)	Category	Diam.	Ref
678701	2017 US_{161}	—	October 29, 2017	Mount Lemmon	Mount Lemmon Survey	·	1.2 km	MPC · JPL
678702	2017 UX_{169}	—	October 17, 2017	Mount Lemmon	Mount Lemmon Survey	·	2.3 km	MPC · JPL
678703	2017 UK_{175}	—	October 27, 2017	Haleakala	Pan-STARRS 1	·	2.4 km	MPC · JPL
678704	2017 UA_{198}	—	October 22, 2017	Mount Lemmon	Mount Lemmon Survey	·	1.4 km	MPC · JPL
678705	2017 VC_{1}	—	September 16, 2004	Socorro	LINEAR	·	1.3 km	MPC · JPL
678706	2017 VN_{1}	—	February 27, 2016	Mount Lemmon	Mount Lemmon Survey	H	470 m	MPC · JPL
678707	2017 VD_{3}	—	October 10, 2012	Mount Lemmon	Mount Lemmon Survey	·	1.2 km	MPC · JPL
678708	2017 VM_{3}	—	May 3, 2016	Haleakala	Pan-STARRS 1	·	1.5 km	MPC · JPL
678709	2017 VR_{3}	—	August 25, 2012	Mount Lemmon	Mount Lemmon Survey	GEF	970 m	MPC · JPL
678710	2017 VC_{4}	—	October 6, 2013	Mount Lemmon	Mount Lemmon Survey	·	910 m	MPC · JPL
678711	2017 VK_{4}	—	September 8, 2004	Socorro	LINEAR	·	1.2 km	MPC · JPL
678712	2017 VE_{5}	—	December 21, 2006	Kitt Peak	L. H. Wasserman, M. W. Buie	·	1.4 km	MPC · JPL
678713	2017 VD_{9}	—	October 30, 2007	Mount Lemmon	Mount Lemmon Survey	KOR	1.1 km	MPC · JPL
678714	2017 VJ_{14}	—	December 9, 2004	Socorro	LINEAR	·	1.5 km	MPC · JPL
678715	2017 VV_{14}	—	November 14, 2017	Mount Lemmon	Mount Lemmon Survey	APO · PHA	760 m	MPC · JPL
678716	2017 VQ_{17}	—	September 23, 2017	Haleakala	Pan-STARRS 1	H	430 m	MPC · JPL
678717	2017 VZ_{17}	—	April 30, 2014	Haleakala	Pan-STARRS 1	·	2.4 km	MPC · JPL
678718	2017 VS_{18}	—	February 19, 2015	Haleakala	Pan-STARRS 1	·	1.3 km	MPC · JPL
678719	2017 VU_{18}	—	September 26, 2017	Mount Lemmon	Mount Lemmon Survey	MAR	820 m	MPC · JPL
678720	2017 VF_{19}	—	August 26, 2012	Haleakala	Pan-STARRS 1	AGN	820 m	MPC · JPL
678721	2017 VM_{19}	—	September 24, 2017	Mount Lemmon	Mount Lemmon Survey	·	1.5 km	MPC · JPL
678722	2017 VH_{20}	—	March 17, 2015	Haleakala	Pan-STARRS 1	EOS	1.6 km	MPC · JPL
678723	2017 VG_{21}	—	September 30, 2003	Kitt Peak	Spacewatch	·	1.5 km	MPC · JPL
678724	2017 VB_{22}	—	March 5, 2000	Cerro Tololo	Deep Lens Survey	·	1.3 km	MPC · JPL
678725	2017 VO_{22}	—	November 13, 2017	Haleakala	Pan-STARRS 1	·	840 m	MPC · JPL
678726	2017 VK_{25}	—	November 23, 2012	Kitt Peak	Spacewatch	·	1.6 km	MPC · JPL
678727	2017 VG_{26}	—	December 12, 2012	Mount Lemmon	Mount Lemmon Survey	·	1.8 km	MPC · JPL
678728	2017 VM_{26}	—	October 10, 2008	Kitt Peak	Spacewatch	·	1.3 km	MPC · JPL
678729	2017 VQ_{26}	—	October 8, 2008	Mount Lemmon	Mount Lemmon Survey	·	1.2 km	MPC · JPL
678730	2017 VF_{27}	—	March 15, 2012	Kitt Peak	Spacewatch	·	1.2 km	MPC · JPL
678731	2017 VD_{28}	—	April 29, 2014	Cerro Tololo-DECam	DECam	·	1.9 km	MPC · JPL
678732	2017 VF_{28}	—	August 3, 2017	Haleakala	Pan-STARRS 1	(5)	930 m	MPC · JPL
678733	2017 VA_{29}	—	May 6, 2006	Mount Lemmon	Mount Lemmon Survey	·	840 m	MPC · JPL
678734	2017 VP_{29}	—	October 11, 2012	Haleakala	Pan-STARRS 1	KOR	990 m	MPC · JPL
678735	2017 VV_{29}	—	October 12, 2006	San Marcello	San Marcello	·	960 m	MPC · JPL
678736	2017 VB_{30}	—	October 23, 2012	Kitt Peak	Spacewatch	EOS	1.2 km	MPC · JPL
678737	2017 VZ_{31}	—	August 3, 2017	Haleakala	Pan-STARRS 1	·	1.4 km	MPC · JPL
678738	2017 VP_{32}	—	September 22, 2008	Kitt Peak	Spacewatch	·	1.3 km	MPC · JPL
678739	2017 VW_{32}	—	January 27, 2006	Mount Lemmon	Mount Lemmon Survey	·	730 m	MPC · JPL
678740	2017 VH_{33}	—	April 18, 2015	Cerro Tololo-DECam	DECam	·	960 m	MPC · JPL
678741	2017 VO_{33}	—	December 27, 2013	Mount Lemmon	Mount Lemmon Survey	KON	1.8 km	MPC · JPL
678742	2017 VQ_{33}	—	August 4, 2017	Haleakala	Pan-STARRS 1	·	840 m	MPC · JPL
678743	2017 VZ_{33}	—	November 14, 1998	Kitt Peak	Spacewatch	NYS	1.4 km	MPC · JPL
678744	2017 VX_{34}	—	November 12, 2017	Mount Lemmon	Mount Lemmon Survey	·	1.7 km	MPC · JPL
678745	2017 VC_{35}	—	November 12, 2017	Mount Lemmon	Mount Lemmon Survey	THB	2.0 km	MPC · JPL
678746	2017 VM_{37}	—	April 18, 2015	Cerro Tololo-DECam	DECam	·	860 m	MPC · JPL
678747	2017 VN_{39}	—	November 13, 2017	Haleakala	Pan-STARRS 1	·	2.5 km	MPC · JPL
678748	2017 VD_{40}	—	October 2, 2017	Mount Lemmon	Mount Lemmon Survey	·	2.0 km	MPC · JPL
678749	2017 VR_{41}	—	November 9, 2017	Haleakala	Pan-STARRS 1	·	2.7 km	MPC · JPL
678750	2017 VW_{41}	—	October 22, 2012	Mount Lemmon	Mount Lemmon Survey	KOR	1.1 km	MPC · JPL
678751	2017 VO_{42}	—	November 15, 2017	Mount Lemmon	Mount Lemmon Survey	EUN	870 m	MPC · JPL
678752	2017 VS_{42}	—	November 15, 2017	Mount Lemmon	Mount Lemmon Survey	·	1.3 km	MPC · JPL
678753	2017 VH_{43}	—	March 20, 2015	Haleakala	Pan-STARRS 1	·	1.3 km	MPC · JPL
678754	2017 VA_{44}	—	November 14, 2017	Mount Lemmon	Mount Lemmon Survey	(5)	850 m	MPC · JPL
678755	2017 VT_{50}	—	November 14, 2017	Mount Lemmon	Mount Lemmon Survey	·	1.9 km	MPC · JPL
678756	2017 VF_{52}	—	November 12, 2017	Mount Lemmon	Mount Lemmon Survey	ADE	1.6 km	MPC · JPL
678757	2017 WG	—	May 29, 2017	Mount Lemmon	Mount Lemmon Survey	·	1.5 km	MPC · JPL
678758	2017 WC_{1}	—	October 25, 2017	Mount Lemmon	Mount Lemmon Survey	·	1.4 km	MPC · JPL
678759	2017 WF_{3}	—	September 26, 2017	Haleakala	Pan-STARRS 1	·	1.5 km	MPC · JPL
678760	2017 WJ_{4}	—	October 6, 1996	Kitt Peak	Spacewatch	·	820 m	MPC · JPL
678761	2017 WK_{4}	—	July 30, 2017	Haleakala	Pan-STARRS 1	·	1.1 km	MPC · JPL
678762	2017 WL_{5}	—	November 18, 2007	Mount Lemmon	Mount Lemmon Survey	·	1.5 km	MPC · JPL
678763	2017 WP_{6}	—	October 7, 2012	Haleakala	Pan-STARRS 1	BRA	1.1 km	MPC · JPL
678764	2017 WC_{7}	—	November 15, 2017	Mount Lemmon	Mount Lemmon Survey	·	2.9 km	MPC · JPL
678765	2017 WV_{8}	—	March 31, 2009	Mount Lemmon	Mount Lemmon Survey	·	1.9 km	MPC · JPL
678766	2017 WM_{11}	—	May 5, 2016	Haleakala	Pan-STARRS 1	T_{j} (2.98)	1.9 km	MPC · JPL
678767	2017 WS_{11}	—	November 19, 2009	Mount Lemmon	Mount Lemmon Survey	H	550 m	MPC · JPL
678768	2017 WN_{12}	—	April 11, 2002	Palomar	NEAT	·	4.7 km	MPC · JPL
678769	2017 WP_{14}	—	April 16, 2007	Catalina	CSS	T_{j} (2.99)	4.1 km	MPC · JPL
678770	2017 WZ_{15}	—	December 3, 2002	Palomar	NEAT	·	3.0 km	MPC · JPL
678771	2017 WY_{16}	—	September 1, 2017	Kitt Peak	Spacewatch	·	2.3 km	MPC · JPL
678772	2017 WT_{17}	—	December 11, 2012	Mount Lemmon	Mount Lemmon Survey	·	1.7 km	MPC · JPL
678773	2017 WS_{19}	—	April 13, 2012	Kitt Peak	Spacewatch	·	800 m	MPC · JPL
678774	2017 WB_{22}	—	January 8, 2006	Kitt Peak	Spacewatch	·	1 km	MPC · JPL
678775	2017 WW_{22}	—	December 1, 2006	Mount Lemmon	Mount Lemmon Survey	·	2.2 km	MPC · JPL
678776	2017 WU_{24}	—	December 27, 2013	Mount Lemmon	Mount Lemmon Survey	TIN	1.1 km	MPC · JPL
678777	2017 WR_{25}	—	April 4, 2002	Palomar	NEAT	EUP	2.8 km	MPC · JPL
678778	2017 WU_{25}	—	March 16, 2015	Haleakala	Pan-STARRS 1	·	1.9 km	MPC · JPL
678779	2017 WX_{25}	—	June 16, 2004	Kitt Peak	Spacewatch	·	1.6 km	MPC · JPL
678780	2017 WX_{26}	—	December 30, 2013	Nogales	M. Schwartz, P. R. Holvorcem	·	1.3 km	MPC · JPL
678781	2017 WR_{29}	—	November 25, 2017	XuYi	PMO NEO Survey Program	EUN	1.1 km	MPC · JPL
678782	2017 WT_{30}	—	November 16, 2017	Mount Lemmon	Mount Lemmon Survey	·	1.4 km	MPC · JPL
678783	2017 WD_{31}	—	November 22, 2017	Haleakala	Pan-STARRS 1	·	2.3 km	MPC · JPL
678784	2017 WJ_{32}	—	November 18, 2017	Haleakala	Pan-STARRS 1	·	2.3 km	MPC · JPL
678785	2017 WS_{32}	—	November 16, 2017	Mount Lemmon	Mount Lemmon Survey	·	1.0 km	MPC · JPL
678786	2017 WW_{33}	—	November 17, 2017	Mount Lemmon	Mount Lemmon Survey	·	1.9 km	MPC · JPL
678787	2017 WD_{34}	—	September 26, 2005	Kitt Peak	Spacewatch	·	2.1 km	MPC · JPL
678788	2017 WG_{35}	—	November 16, 2017	Mount Lemmon	Mount Lemmon Survey	·	1.1 km	MPC · JPL
678789	2017 WC_{38}	—	August 2, 2016	Haleakala	Pan-STARRS 1	·	1.3 km	MPC · JPL
678790	2017 WZ_{39}	—	November 16, 2017	Mount Lemmon	Mount Lemmon Survey	THB	2.4 km	MPC · JPL
678791	2017 WF_{42}	—	April 8, 2014	Mount Lemmon	Mount Lemmon Survey	·	2.2 km	MPC · JPL
678792	2017 WM_{44}	—	November 22, 2017	Haleakala	Pan-STARRS 1	T_{j} (2.96)	2.8 km	MPC · JPL
678793	2017 WQ_{44}	—	November 24, 2017	Mount Lemmon	Mount Lemmon Survey	·	1.8 km	MPC · JPL
678794	2017 WU_{44}	—	November 24, 2017	Haleakala	Pan-STARRS 1	·	940 m	MPC · JPL
678795	2017 WX_{44}	—	November 21, 2017	Mount Lemmon	Mount Lemmon Survey	·	1.5 km	MPC · JPL
678796	2017 WA_{46}	—	November 26, 2017	Mount Lemmon	Mount Lemmon Survey	·	2.4 km	MPC · JPL
678797	2017 WT_{46}	—	November 27, 2017	Mount Lemmon	Mount Lemmon Survey	·	1.2 km	MPC · JPL
678798	2017 WY_{47}	—	April 11, 2015	Mount Lemmon	Mount Lemmon Survey	PAD	1.2 km	MPC · JPL
678799	2017 WB_{48}	—	November 16, 2017	Mount Lemmon	Mount Lemmon Survey	·	1.6 km	MPC · JPL
678800 Juška	2017 WW_{49}	Juška	November 17, 2017	Baldone	K. Černis, I. Eglītis	·	1.2 km	MPC · JPL

== 678801–678900 ==
back to top

Designation			Discovery			Properties		Ref
Permanent	Provisional	Named after	Date	Site	Discoverer(s)	Category	Diam.	Ref
678801	2017 WX_{61}	—	April 21, 2015	Cerro Tololo	DECam	·	1.5 km	MPC · JPL
678802	2017 WG_{64}	—	November 22, 2017	Haleakala	Pan-STARRS 1	·	2.6 km	MPC · JPL
678803	2017 WH_{64}	—	May 23, 2014	Haleakala	Pan-STARRS 1	(21885)	2.2 km	MPC · JPL
678804	2017 WT_{76}	—	November 21, 2017	Mount Lemmon	Mount Lemmon Survey	·	1.4 km	MPC · JPL
678805	2017 XG_{3}	—	November 27, 2009	Mount Lemmon	Mount Lemmon Survey	EUN	1.2 km	MPC · JPL
678806	2017 XH_{4}	—	November 26, 2013	Kitt Peak	Spacewatch	RAF	880 m	MPC · JPL
678807	2017 XC_{7}	—	December 3, 2012	Mount Lemmon	Mount Lemmon Survey	·	1.6 km	MPC · JPL
678808	2017 XL_{7}	—	February 24, 2014	Haleakala	Pan-STARRS 1	EOS	1.4 km	MPC · JPL
678809	2017 XP_{9}	—	April 2, 2016	Haleakala	Pan-STARRS 1	·	940 m	MPC · JPL
678810	2017 XX_{12}	—	October 28, 2017	Haleakala	Pan-STARRS 1	·	630 m	MPC · JPL
678811	2017 XO_{13}	—	October 27, 2017	Mount Lemmon	Mount Lemmon Survey	EOS	1.4 km	MPC · JPL
678812	2017 XH_{14}	—	November 9, 2007	Kitt Peak	Spacewatch	KOR	1.0 km	MPC · JPL
678813	2017 XD_{17}	—	October 19, 2003	Kitt Peak	Spacewatch	·	750 m	MPC · JPL
678814	2017 XP_{17}	—	May 20, 2015	Cerro Tololo-DECam	DECam	·	1.5 km	MPC · JPL
678815	2017 XT_{17}	—	July 9, 2016	Haleakala	Pan-STARRS 1	EOS	1.6 km	MPC · JPL
678816	2017 XJ_{19}	—	December 1, 2005	Kitt Peak	Wasserman, L. H., Millis, R. L.	·	1.3 km	MPC · JPL
678817	2017 XM_{24}	—	October 11, 2012	Haleakala	Pan-STARRS 1	·	1.5 km	MPC · JPL
678818	2017 XR_{27}	—	November 6, 2012	Mount Lemmon	Mount Lemmon Survey	·	1.6 km	MPC · JPL
678819	2017 XX_{27}	—	April 18, 2015	Cerro Tololo-DECam	DECam	·	1.2 km	MPC · JPL
678820	2017 XH_{28}	—	May 20, 2015	Cerro Tololo-DECam	DECam	·	1.7 km	MPC · JPL
678821	2017 XR_{29}	—	December 29, 2005	Kitt Peak	Spacewatch	(5)	1.1 km	MPC · JPL
678822	2017 XH_{34}	—	December 4, 2007	Mount Lemmon	Mount Lemmon Survey	KOR	1.2 km	MPC · JPL
678823	2017 XX_{35}	—	October 30, 2017	Haleakala	Pan-STARRS 1	·	2.3 km	MPC · JPL
678824	2017 XL_{36}	—	September 18, 2003	Kitt Peak	Spacewatch	·	1.6 km	MPC · JPL
678825	2017 XM_{37}	—	February 26, 2014	Haleakala	Pan-STARRS 1	·	1.5 km	MPC · JPL
678826	2017 XM_{38}	—	November 18, 2009	Kitt Peak	Spacewatch	EUN	900 m	MPC · JPL
678827	2017 XU_{38}	—	November 14, 2007	Kitt Peak	Spacewatch	·	1.5 km	MPC · JPL
678828	2017 XW_{38}	—	September 23, 2013	Mount Lemmon	Mount Lemmon Survey	·	940 m	MPC · JPL
678829	2017 XB_{39}	—	November 21, 2017	Mount Lemmon	Mount Lemmon Survey	·	2.3 km	MPC · JPL
678830	2017 XO_{39}	—	October 22, 2003	Apache Point	SDSS Collaboration	·	1.5 km	MPC · JPL
678831	2017 XU_{42}	—	June 7, 2016	Haleakala	Pan-STARRS 1	EOS	1.7 km	MPC · JPL
678832	2017 XZ_{47}	—	September 12, 2001	Kitt Peak	Spacewatch	·	1.4 km	MPC · JPL
678833	2017 XO_{52}	—	December 12, 2012	Mount Lemmon	Mount Lemmon Survey	·	1.4 km	MPC · JPL
678834	2017 XQ_{52}	—	November 9, 2017	Cerro Paranal	Altmann, M., Prusti, T.	·	1.3 km	MPC · JPL
678835	2017 XJ_{53}	—	March 7, 2016	Haleakala	Pan-STARRS 1	·	1.5 km	MPC · JPL
678836	2017 XN_{53}	—	November 19, 2008	Kitt Peak	Spacewatch	HOF	1.9 km	MPC · JPL
678837	2017 XN_{54}	—	October 30, 2017	Haleakala	Pan-STARRS 1	·	1.5 km	MPC · JPL
678838	2017 XG_{56}	—	November 4, 2004	Kitt Peak	Spacewatch	·	1.6 km	MPC · JPL
678839	2017 XR_{56}	—	October 30, 2017	Haleakala	Pan-STARRS 1	·	1.8 km	MPC · JPL
678840	2017 XO_{58}	—	May 14, 2015	Haleakala	Pan-STARRS 1	·	1.7 km	MPC · JPL
678841	2017 XJ_{63}	—	June 4, 2014	Haleakala	Pan-STARRS 1	H	530 m	MPC · JPL
678842	2017 XO_{63}	—	December 12, 2017	Haleakala	Pan-STARRS 1	·	2.0 km	MPC · JPL
678843	2017 XP_{63}	—	December 13, 2017	Mount Lemmon	Mount Lemmon Survey	·	2.5 km	MPC · JPL
678844	2017 XW_{63}	—	December 13, 2017	Mount Lemmon	Mount Lemmon Survey	·	3.0 km	MPC · JPL
678845	2017 XG_{64}	—	December 12, 2017	Haleakala	Pan-STARRS 1	·	2.6 km	MPC · JPL
678846	2017 XY_{65}	—	December 13, 2017	Mount Lemmon	Mount Lemmon Survey	·	3.2 km	MPC · JPL
678847	2017 XT_{67}	—	December 10, 2017	Haleakala	Pan-STARRS 1	(5)	900 m	MPC · JPL
678848	2017 XH_{69}	—	December 12, 2017	Haleakala	Pan-STARRS 1	·	1.4 km	MPC · JPL
678849	2017 XN_{69}	—	December 13, 2017	Haleakala	Pan-STARRS 1	TIR	2.3 km	MPC · JPL
678850	2017 XR_{69}	—	December 15, 2017	Mount Lemmon	Mount Lemmon Survey	·	2.4 km	MPC · JPL
678851	2017 XE_{70}	—	November 21, 2003	Kitt Peak	Spacewatch	AEO	920 m	MPC · JPL
678852	2017 XG_{70}	—	December 14, 2017	Haleakala	Pan-STARRS 1	GEF	870 m	MPC · JPL
678853	2017 XV_{71}	—	December 10, 2017	Haleakala	Pan-STARRS 1	EOS	1.4 km	MPC · JPL
678854	2017 XE_{72}	—	December 15, 2017	Mount Lemmon	Mount Lemmon Survey	·	2.6 km	MPC · JPL
678855	2017 XP_{72}	—	December 14, 2017	Mount Lemmon	Mount Lemmon Survey	·	1.0 km	MPC · JPL
678856	2017 XX_{72}	—	December 13, 2017	Haleakala	Pan-STARRS 1	HYG	1.8 km	MPC · JPL
678857	2017 XD_{74}	—	December 12, 2017	Haleakala	Pan-STARRS 1	·	1.9 km	MPC · JPL
678858	2017 XB_{78}	—	December 13, 2017	Mount Lemmon	Mount Lemmon Survey	·	1.6 km	MPC · JPL
678859	2017 XK_{81}	—	December 15, 2017	Mount Lemmon	Mount Lemmon Survey	EOS	1.4 km	MPC · JPL
678860	2017 XS_{88}	—	January 19, 2013	Kitt Peak	Spacewatch	·	1.8 km	MPC · JPL
678861	2017 YH	—	December 5, 2016	Space Surveillance	Space Surveillance Telescope	IEO +1km	850 m	MPC · JPL
678862	2017 YN	—	September 2, 2016	Mount Lemmon	Mount Lemmon Survey	EUP	3.4 km	MPC · JPL
678863	2017 YN_{2}	—	February 20, 2014	Haleakala	Pan-STARRS 1	·	1.5 km	MPC · JPL
678864	2017 YX_{2}	—	December 23, 2017	Haleakala	Pan-STARRS 1	·	2.0 km	MPC · JPL
678865	2017 YK_{3}	—	December 23, 2017	Haleakala	Pan-STARRS 1	plutino	211 km	MPC · JPL
678866	2017 YX_{6}	—	January 18, 2012	Kitt Peak	Spacewatch	T_{j} (2.9)	3.3 km	MPC · JPL
678867	2017 YM_{9}	—	October 1, 2008	Catalina	CSS	·	1.9 km	MPC · JPL
678868	2017 YO_{9}	—	May 30, 2016	Haleakala	Pan-STARRS 1	·	1.7 km	MPC · JPL
678869	2017 YF_{10}	—	August 10, 2016	Haleakala	Pan-STARRS 1	·	2.2 km	MPC · JPL
678870	2017 YT_{11}	—	August 1, 2016	Haleakala	Pan-STARRS 1	·	2.7 km	MPC · JPL
678871	2017 YW_{12}	—	February 8, 2008	Mount Lemmon	Mount Lemmon Survey	·	1.9 km	MPC · JPL
678872	2017 YT_{13}	—	January 22, 2013	Mount Lemmon	Mount Lemmon Survey	·	2.4 km	MPC · JPL
678873	2017 YV_{13}	—	February 17, 2004	Kitt Peak	Spacewatch	·	970 m	MPC · JPL
678874	2017 YT_{14}	—	January 13, 2005	Catalina	CSS	·	2.2 km	MPC · JPL
678875	2017 YC_{15}	—	November 3, 2011	Mount Lemmon	Mount Lemmon Survey	·	3.5 km	MPC · JPL
678876	2017 YF_{15}	—	November 29, 2013	Kitt Peak	Spacewatch	·	1.1 km	MPC · JPL
678877	2017 YG_{15}	—	January 28, 2014	Catalina	CSS	·	1.2 km	MPC · JPL
678878	2017 YZ_{15}	—	October 10, 2016	Mount Lemmon	Mount Lemmon Survey	·	2.5 km	MPC · JPL
678879	2017 YR_{21}	—	April 23, 2014	Cerro Tololo	DECam	·	1.7 km	MPC · JPL
678880	2017 YQ_{22}	—	December 28, 2017	Mount Lemmon	Mount Lemmon Survey	·	2.9 km	MPC · JPL
678881	2017 YU_{23}	—	December 23, 2017	Haleakala	Pan-STARRS 1	EOS	1.5 km	MPC · JPL
678882	2017 YZ_{26}	—	December 23, 2017	Haleakala	Pan-STARRS 1	VER	2.2 km	MPC · JPL
678883	2017 YG_{27}	—	December 23, 2017	Haleakala	Pan-STARRS 1	·	2.1 km	MPC · JPL
678884	2017 YO_{27}	—	April 28, 2014	Cerro Tololo	DECam	·	1.7 km	MPC · JPL
678885	2017 YB_{28}	—	May 23, 2014	Haleakala	Pan-STARRS 1	EUP	2.6 km	MPC · JPL
678886	2017 YH_{28}	—	December 20, 2017	Mount Lemmon	Mount Lemmon Survey	ADE	1.6 km	MPC · JPL
678887	2017 YT_{28}	—	December 24, 2017	Haleakala	Pan-STARRS 1	PHO	740 m	MPC · JPL
678888	2017 YQ_{35}	—	December 28, 2017	Mount Lemmon	Mount Lemmon Survey	H	460 m	MPC · JPL
678889	2017 YK_{37}	—	December 26, 2017	Mount Lemmon	Mount Lemmon Survey	·	2.8 km	MPC · JPL
678890	2017 YF_{38}	—	December 23, 2017	Haleakala	Pan-STARRS 1	·	2.7 km	MPC · JPL
678891	2017 YK_{39}	—	April 5, 2014	Haleakala	Pan-STARRS 1	·	1.7 km	MPC · JPL
678892	2017 YY_{39}	—	December 24, 2017	Haleakala	Pan-STARRS 1	·	2.8 km	MPC · JPL
678893	2017 YP_{41}	—	November 10, 2016	Mount Lemmon	Mount Lemmon Survey	·	2.7 km	MPC · JPL
678894	2017 YE_{43}	—	December 24, 2017	Haleakala	Pan-STARRS 1	·	1.0 km	MPC · JPL
678895	2017 YA_{44}	—	December 23, 2017	Haleakala	Pan-STARRS 1	·	2.2 km	MPC · JPL
678896	2017 YM_{45}	—	December 26, 2017	Mount Lemmon	Mount Lemmon Survey	·	1.6 km	MPC · JPL
678897	2017 YA_{52}	—	December 25, 2017	Haleakala	Pan-STARRS 1	·	2.7 km	MPC · JPL
678898	2017 YG_{70}	—	December 23, 2017	Haleakala	Pan-STARRS 1	·	1.4 km	MPC · JPL
678899	2018 AG_{2}	—	January 9, 2018	Haleakala	Pan-STARRS 1	APO	380 m	MPC · JPL
678900	2018 AY_{2}	—	July 19, 2009	Siding Spring	SSS	·	1.7 km	MPC · JPL

== 678901–679000 ==
back to top

Designation			Discovery			Properties		Ref
Permanent	Provisional	Named after	Date	Site	Discoverer(s)	Category	Diam.	Ref
678901	2018 AR_{4}	—	October 28, 2017	Haleakala	Pan-STARRS 1	LUT	3.3 km	MPC · JPL
678902	2018 AB_{5}	—	August 8, 2016	Haleakala	Pan-STARRS 1	LIX	2.4 km	MPC · JPL
678903	2018 AV_{6}	—	October 12, 2016	Haleakala	Pan-STARRS 1	·	2.3 km	MPC · JPL
678904	2018 AZ_{7}	—	December 27, 2006	Mount Lemmon	Mount Lemmon Survey	·	2.7 km	MPC · JPL
678905	2018 AM_{8}	—	February 14, 2013	Mount Lemmon	Mount Lemmon Survey	·	2.3 km	MPC · JPL
678906	2018 AV_{10}	—	November 23, 2011	Kitt Peak	Spacewatch	·	2.2 km	MPC · JPL
678907	2018 AX_{10}	—	September 13, 2007	Kitt Peak	Spacewatch	·	1.8 km	MPC · JPL
678908	2018 AC_{11}	—	September 28, 2008	Mount Lemmon	Mount Lemmon Survey	·	1.5 km	MPC · JPL
678909	2018 AU_{14}	—	November 24, 2011	Mount Lemmon	Mount Lemmon Survey	HYG	2.3 km	MPC · JPL
678910	2018 AZ_{16}	—	September 23, 2015	Haleakala	Pan-STARRS 1	LUT	4.4 km	MPC · JPL
678911	2018 AB_{19}	—	January 15, 2018	Haleakala	Pan-STARRS 1	·	2.2 km	MPC · JPL
678912	2018 AH_{22}	—	January 11, 2018	Haleakala	Pan-STARRS 1	·	2.3 km	MPC · JPL
678913	2018 AO_{22}	—	January 12, 2018	Mount Lemmon	Mount Lemmon Survey	·	2.2 km	MPC · JPL
678914	2018 AV_{22}	—	January 14, 2018	Haleakala	Pan-STARRS 1	·	2.1 km	MPC · JPL
678915	2018 AD_{23}	—	January 12, 2018	Mount Lemmon	Mount Lemmon Survey	·	2.2 km	MPC · JPL
678916	2018 AO_{23}	—	January 14, 2018	Mount Lemmon	Mount Lemmon Survey	·	2.4 km	MPC · JPL
678917	2018 AE_{27}	—	January 13, 2018	Mount Lemmon	Mount Lemmon Survey	THM	1.6 km	MPC · JPL
678918	2018 AU_{27}	—	January 15, 2018	Haleakala	Pan-STARRS 1	·	3.1 km	MPC · JPL
678919	2018 AQ_{28}	—	January 13, 2018	Mount Lemmon	Mount Lemmon Survey	·	3.1 km	MPC · JPL
678920	2018 AQ_{29}	—	January 12, 2018	Haleakala	Pan-STARRS 1	·	2.7 km	MPC · JPL
678921	2018 AM_{36}	—	January 9, 2018	Mount Lemmon	Mount Lemmon Survey	H	420 m	MPC · JPL
678922	2018 AJ_{39}	—	March 14, 2007	Mount Lemmon	Mount Lemmon Survey	H	430 m	MPC · JPL
678923	2018 AG_{41}	—	January 14, 2018	Haleakala	Pan-STARRS 1	·	2.5 km	MPC · JPL
678924	2018 AY_{46}	—	April 28, 2014	Cerro Tololo	DECam	·	2.3 km	MPC · JPL
678925	2018 AZ_{54}	—	January 15, 2018	Haleakala	Pan-STARRS 1	·	1.8 km	MPC · JPL
678926	2018 AR_{62}	—	October 6, 2016	Haleakala	Pan-STARRS 1	·	2.0 km	MPC · JPL
678927	2018 BP	—	January 16, 2018	Mount Lemmon	Mount Lemmon Survey	APO · PHA · fast	270 m	MPC · JPL
678928	2018 BA_{2}	—	February 20, 2009	Kitt Peak	Spacewatch	KOR	1.3 km	MPC · JPL
678929	2018 BL_{2}	—	December 13, 2017	Mount Lemmon	Mount Lemmon Survey	·	1.9 km	MPC · JPL
678930	2018 BO_{2}	—	September 5, 2010	Mount Lemmon	Mount Lemmon Survey	·	2.6 km	MPC · JPL
678931	2018 BP_{7}	—	January 2, 2012	Mount Lemmon	Mount Lemmon Survey	·	2.8 km	MPC · JPL
678932	2018 BP_{8}	—	March 10, 2007	Kitt Peak	Spacewatch	PHO	910 m	MPC · JPL
678933	2018 BX_{8}	—	October 6, 2016	Mount Lemmon	Mount Lemmon Survey	·	2.7 km	MPC · JPL
678934	2018 BZ_{8}	—	October 22, 2016	Mount Lemmon	Mount Lemmon Survey	·	2.9 km	MPC · JPL
678935	2018 BH_{9}	—	November 13, 2006	Mount Lemmon	Mount Lemmon Survey	·	1.8 km	MPC · JPL
678936	2018 BD_{10}	—	March 5, 2013	Mount Lemmon	Mount Lemmon Survey	·	2.2 km	MPC · JPL
678937	2018 BP_{10}	—	May 28, 2014	Haleakala	Pan-STARRS 1	·	3.0 km	MPC · JPL
678938	2018 BW_{10}	—	October 21, 2016	Mount Lemmon	Mount Lemmon Survey	EOS	1.4 km	MPC · JPL
678939	2018 BC_{11}	—	April 20, 2013	Palomar	Palomar Transient Factory	EUP	2.5 km	MPC · JPL
678940	2018 BA_{13}	—	August 12, 2015	Haleakala	Pan-STARRS 1	·	2.1 km	MPC · JPL
678941	2018 BJ_{13}	—	January 16, 2018	Haleakala	Pan-STARRS 1	·	2.7 km	MPC · JPL
678942	2018 BL_{16}	—	January 27, 2018	Mount Lemmon	Mount Lemmon Survey	·	2.3 km	MPC · JPL
678943	2018 BZ_{17}	—	January 20, 2018	Haleakala	Pan-STARRS 1	·	2.0 km	MPC · JPL
678944	2018 BO_{18}	—	January 25, 2018	Mount Lemmon	Mount Lemmon Survey	·	2.5 km	MPC · JPL
678945	2018 BB_{22}	—	April 18, 2015	Cerro Tololo	DECam	·	640 m	MPC · JPL
678946	2018 BG_{24}	—	January 25, 2018	Mount Lemmon	Mount Lemmon Survey	H	440 m	MPC · JPL
678947	2018 BF_{28}	—	January 16, 2018	Haleakala	Pan-STARRS 1	VER	2.0 km	MPC · JPL
678948	2018 BK_{30}	—	January 16, 2018	Haleakala	Pan-STARRS 1	·	2.7 km	MPC · JPL
678949	2018 CZ_{4}	—	February 22, 2009	Kitt Peak	Spacewatch	DOR	2.1 km	MPC · JPL
678950	2018 CE_{5}	—	September 5, 2010	Mount Lemmon	Mount Lemmon Survey	T_{j} (2.98)	3.2 km	MPC · JPL
678951	2018 CV_{5}	—	April 21, 2004	Socorro	LINEAR	·	1.3 km	MPC · JPL
678952	2018 CP_{6}	—	October 19, 2011	Haleakala	Lister, T.	·	2.1 km	MPC · JPL
678953	2018 CX_{6}	—	February 26, 2007	Catalina	CSS	·	2.7 km	MPC · JPL
678954	2018 CJ_{7}	—	September 26, 2012	Mount Lemmon	Mount Lemmon Survey	JUN	870 m	MPC · JPL
678955	2018 CK_{7}	—	December 27, 2008	Bisei	BATTeRS	·	2.4 km	MPC · JPL
678956	2018 CL_{7}	—	January 17, 2007	Catalina	CSS	·	2.9 km	MPC · JPL
678957	2018 CB_{8}	—	December 11, 1998	Kitt Peak	Spacewatch	·	1.4 km	MPC · JPL
678958	2018 CH_{10}	—	January 3, 2012	Kitt Peak	Spacewatch	EUP	3.5 km	MPC · JPL
678959	2018 CJ_{10}	—	January 2, 2012	Catalina	CSS	THB	3.1 km	MPC · JPL
678960	2018 CK_{10}	—	October 30, 2016	Mount Lemmon	Mount Lemmon Survey	T_{j} (2.97)	2.5 km	MPC · JPL
678961	2018 CQ_{10}	—	October 23, 2012	Nogales	M. Schwartz, P. R. Holvorcem	JUN	1.1 km	MPC · JPL
678962	2018 CU_{10}	—	March 16, 2013	Catalina	CSS	·	2.3 km	MPC · JPL
678963	2018 CQ_{11}	—	February 17, 2007	Mount Lemmon	Mount Lemmon Survey	·	1.2 km	MPC · JPL
678964	2018 CC_{14}	—	February 12, 2018	Haleakala	Pan-STARRS 1	APO	120 m	MPC · JPL
678965	2018 CG_{16}	—	December 18, 2003	Kitt Peak	Spacewatch	·	1.8 km	MPC · JPL
678966	2018 CE_{17}	—	February 12, 2018	Haleakala	Pan-STARRS 1	·	2.1 km	MPC · JPL
678967	2018 CN_{18}	—	February 12, 2018	Haleakala	Pan-STARRS 1	·	2.0 km	MPC · JPL
678968	2018 CP_{18}	—	February 12, 2018	Haleakala	Pan-STARRS 1	·	2.2 km	MPC · JPL
678969	2018 CS_{18}	—	February 10, 2018	Haleakala	Pan-STARRS 1	·	2.3 km	MPC · JPL
678970	2018 CD_{19}	—	February 12, 2018	Haleakala	Pan-STARRS 1	TIR	2.4 km	MPC · JPL
678971	2018 CK_{19}	—	February 11, 2018	Haleakala	Pan-STARRS 1	·	2.6 km	MPC · JPL
678972	2018 CB_{20}	—	February 10, 2018	Haleakala	Pan-STARRS 1	·	2.3 km	MPC · JPL
678973	2018 DJ_{3}	—	December 28, 2013	Kitt Peak	Spacewatch	·	1.0 km	MPC · JPL
678974	2018 EL	—	January 20, 2018	Mount Lemmon	Mount Lemmon Survey	T_{j} (2.94)	3.5 km	MPC · JPL
678975	2018 EF_{3}	—	November 12, 2010	Mount Lemmon	Mount Lemmon Survey	·	2.8 km	MPC · JPL
678976	2018 EH_{4}	—	March 13, 2018	Mount Lemmon	Mount Lemmon Survey	APO · PHA	160 m	MPC · JPL
678977	2018 EB_{5}	—	November 5, 2016	Mount Lemmon	Mount Lemmon Survey	·	2.2 km	MPC · JPL
678978	2018 EJ_{6}	—	March 6, 2014	Nogales	M. Schwartz, P. R. Holvorcem	·	1.6 km	MPC · JPL
678979	2018 EZ_{6}	—	October 7, 2016	Haleakala	Pan-STARRS 1	·	2.9 km	MPC · JPL
678980	2018 FR_{5}	—	December 13, 2010	Mount Lemmon	Mount Lemmon Survey	·	2.9 km	MPC · JPL
678981	2018 FG_{18}	—	January 22, 2012	Haleakala	Pan-STARRS 1	·	2.3 km	MPC · JPL
678982	2018 FE_{20}	—	February 26, 2007	Mount Lemmon	Mount Lemmon Survey	·	3.5 km	MPC · JPL
678983	2018 FE_{22}	—	March 21, 2015	Haleakala	Pan-STARRS 1	·	540 m	MPC · JPL
678984	2018 FE_{26}	—	October 1, 2005	Mount Lemmon	Mount Lemmon Survey	MAS	670 m	MPC · JPL
678985	2018 FL_{28}	—	April 13, 2013	Haleakala	Pan-STARRS 1	·	2.3 km	MPC · JPL
678986	2018 FV_{28}	—	January 29, 2012	Haleakala	Pan-STARRS 1	·	3.0 km	MPC · JPL
678987	2018 FZ_{28}	—	September 16, 2009	Kitt Peak	Spacewatch	·	3.5 km	MPC · JPL
678988	2018 FB_{39}	—	March 17, 2018	Haleakala	Pan-STARRS 1	·	1.1 km	MPC · JPL
678989	2018 GY_{4}	—	April 13, 2018	Haleakala	Pan-STARRS 1	ATE	550 m	MPC · JPL
678990	2018 GB_{6}	—	June 19, 2013	Haleakala	Pan-STARRS 1	·	3.7 km	MPC · JPL
678991	2018 GL_{7}	—	January 18, 2012	Kitt Peak	Spacewatch	·	2.2 km	MPC · JPL
678992	2018 GC_{9}	—	October 8, 2004	Kitt Peak	Spacewatch	EOS	2.0 km	MPC · JPL
678993	2018 GN_{10}	—	September 12, 2015	Haleakala	Pan-STARRS 1	T_{j} (2.97)	3.4 km	MPC · JPL
678994	2018 GF_{21}	—	November 3, 2015	Haleakala	Pan-STARRS 1	·	2.5 km	MPC · JPL
678995	2018 HE_{1}	—	April 14, 2007	Catalina	CSS	T_{j} (2.99)	3.4 km	MPC · JPL
678996	2018 JG	—	March 3, 2013	Mount Lemmon	Mount Lemmon Survey	T_{j} (2.99) · EUP	3.6 km	MPC · JPL
678997	2018 JE_{3}	—	April 13, 2010	Mount Lemmon	Mount Lemmon Survey	H	570 m	MPC · JPL
678998	2018 JP_{3}	—	April 8, 2002	Palomar	NEAT	·	2.6 km	MPC · JPL
678999	2018 JS_{3}	—	March 2, 2008	XuYi	PMO NEO Survey Program	BRA	1.7 km	MPC · JPL
679000	2018 JT_{3}	—	April 25, 2000	Anderson Mesa	LONEOS	·	2.1 km	MPC · JPL

back to top

== Meaning of names ==
As minor planet discoveries are confirmed, they are given a permanent number by the IAU's Minor Planet Center (MPC), and the discoverers can then submit names for them, following the IAU's naming conventions. The list below concerns those minor planets in the specified number-range that have received names, and explains the meanings of those names.

Official naming citations of newly named small Solar System bodies are approved and published in a bulletin by IAU's Working Group for Small Bodies Nomenclature (WGSBN). Before May 2021, citations were published in MPC's Minor Planet Circulars for many decades. Recent citations can also be found on the JPL Small-Body Database (SBDB). Until his death in 2016, German astronomer Lutz D. Schmadel compiled these citations into the Dictionary of Minor Planet Names (DMP) and regularly updated the collection.

Based on Paul Herget's The Names of the Minor Planets, Schmadel also researched the unclear origin of numerous asteroids, most of which had been named prior to World War II. This article incorporates text from this source, which is in the public domain: SBDB New namings may only be added to this list below after official publication as the preannouncement of names is condemned. The WGSBN publishes a comprehensive guideline for the naming rules of non-cometary small Solar System bodies.

Named minor planet	Provisional	This minor planet was named for...	Ref · Catalog
678198 Jeanmariferenbac	2017 OA_{85}	Jean-Marie Fehrenbach (born 1940), French aeronautical engineer and amateur astronomer.	IAU · 678198
678300 Herbertcouriol	2017 QM_{92}	Herbert Couriol (born 1941), French amateur astronomer and participated in the construction of the Bélesta Observatory.	IAU · 678300
678471 Piermichelbergé	2017 SM_{102}	Pierre-Michel Bergé (born 1955), French computer science engineer and amateur astronomer.	IAU · 678471
678676 Liepāja	2017 UK_{101}	Liepāja, third largest city in Latvia, known as the city “where the wind is born”.	IAU · 678676
678800 Juška	2017 WW_{49}	Antanas Juška, Lithuanian astronomer and science popularizer.	IAU · 678800
