= 47171 Lempo =

Triple system of Kuiper belt objects

- Lempo–Hiisi and their outer companion Paha, imaged by the James Webb Space Telescope's Near Infrared Camera. Lempo and Hiisi are unresolved.

Discovery
- Discovered by: Eric P. Rubenstein; Louis-Gregory Strolger
- Discovery site: Kitt Peak National Obs.
- Discovery date: 1 October 1999

Designations
- Pronunciation: /ˈlɛmpoʊ/
- Named after: Lempo (Finnish mythology)
- Alternative designations: 1999 TC_{36}
- Minor planet category: TNO · plutino · distant · triple

Orbital characteristics
- Epoch 17 December 2020 (JD 2459200.5)
- Uncertainty parameter 1
- Observation arc: 46.58 yr (17,013 days)
- Earliest precovery date: 18 June 1974
- Aphelion: 48.397 AU
- Perihelion: 30.542 AU
- Semi-major axis: 39.470 AU
- Eccentricity: 0.22618
- Orbital period (sidereal): 247.97 yr (90,572 days)
- Mean anomaly: 8.547°
- Mean motion: 0° 0^{m} 14.309^{s} / day
- Inclination: 8.4233°
- Longitude of ascending node: 97.020°
- Argument of perihelion: 294.424°
- Known satellites: 2

Physical characteristics
- Mean diameter: 272+17 −19 km (primary)
- Mass: (12.75±0.06)×10^{18} kg (overall system) (14.20±0.05)×10^{18} kg (without Paha); 6.71×10^{18} kg (primary)
- Mean density: 0.64+0.15 −0.11 g/cm^{3} (system)
- Geometric albedo: 0.079+0.013 −0.011 (system)
- Temperature: 50 K (perihelion)
- Spectral type: Spectrally prominent organics, organics-type ("Cliff type TNO"); RR (very red); B–V=1.029±0.047; V−R=0.693±0.032; V−I=1.270±0.050
- Apparent magnitude: 19.9
- Absolute magnitude (H): 5.41±0.10

47171 Lempo, or as a binary (47171) Lempo–Hiisi (provisional designation 1999 TC_{36}), is a triple trans-Neptunian object in the Kuiper belt, located in the outermost regions of the Solar System. It was discovered on 1 October 1999, by American astronomers Eric Rubenstein and Louis-Gregory Strolger during an observing run at Kitt Peak National Observatory in Arizona, United States. Rubenstein was searching images taken by Strolger as part of their Nearby Galaxies Supernova Search project. It is classified as a plutino with a 2:3 mean-motion resonance with Neptune and is among the brighter TNOs. It reached perihelion in July 2015. This minor planet was named after Lempo from Finnish mythology.

The system's other two components, Paha /ˈpɑːhɑː/ and Hiisi /ˈhiːsi/, were discovered in 2001 and 2007, respectively, and later named after Lempo's two demon cohorts, Paha and Hiisi.

== History ==
=== Discovery ===
The Lempo system was discovered on 1 October 1999 by American astronomers Eric Rubenstein and Louis-Gregory Strolger during an observing run for their Nearby Galaxies Supernova Search (NGSS) project at the Kitt Peak National Observatory in Arizona. Initiated in 1998 as part of Strolger's doctoral thesis, the NGSS project was a three-year-long CCD-based survey of galaxies along the celestial equator to search for nearby, low-redshift supernovae. The Kitt Peak Observatory's WIYN 0.9-meter telescope was used for wide-field imaging of this region, which coincided with the ecliptic plane where Kuiper belt objects (KBOs) including Lempo were likely to appear. Rubenstein identified Lempo as a relatively bright, slow-moving object in the constellation Cetus on images taken by Strolger on 1 October 1999. (Note: The celestial coordinates of Lempo at the time of discovery were 23^{h} 57^{m} 49.00^{s} −09° 31′ 52.1″. See Cetus for constellation coordinates.) At an apparent magnitude of 20, its exceptional brightness for a suspected KBO warranted follow-up observations to confirm the object.

Lempo was observed by Rubenstein and Strolger for three consecutive days after its discovery. The object was also found in images taken by Strolger on 30 September 1999, one day prior to its discovery. The discovery was then announced by the Minor Planet Center on 21 December 1999 and the object was given the provisional designation 1999 TC_{36}. The provisional designation indicates that Lempo was the 903rd minor planet discovered in the first half of October 1999. (Note: In the convention for minor planet provisional designations, the first letter represents the half-month of the year of discovery while the second letter and numbers indicate the order of discovery within that half-month. In the case for 1999 TC_{36}, the first letter 'T' corresponds to the first half-month of October 1999 while the succeeding letter 'C' indicates that it is the 3rd object discovered on the 37th cycle of discoveries (with 36 cycles completed). Each completed cycle consists of 25 letters representing discoveries, therefore 3 + (36 completed cycles × 25 letters) = 903.) By 2002, additional observations have extended Lempo's observation arc to over two years, sufficient to determine an accurate orbit. Lempo was consequently given the permanent minor planet number 47171 by the Minor Planet Center on 21 September 2002. As of 2021, more than 500 total observations of Lempo over an observation arc of over 46 years have been documented. The earliest known precovery observations of Lempo have been found in photographic plates of the Siding Spring Observatory's Digitized Sky Survey from June 1974 and May and September 1976.

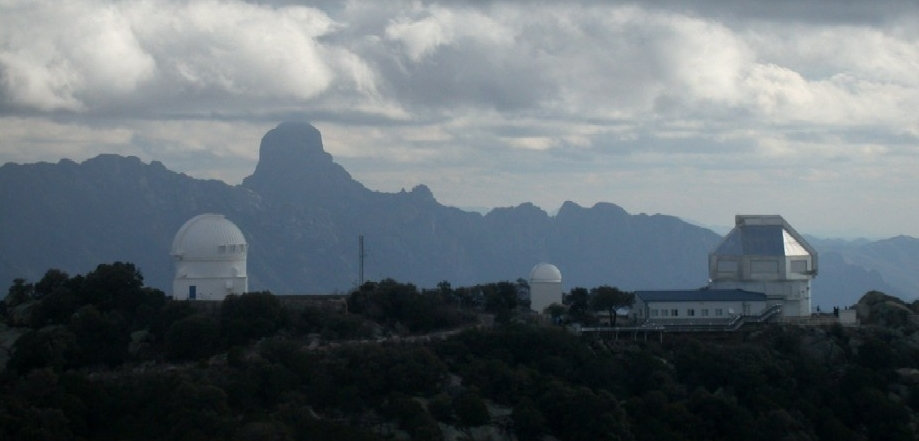
Lempo was discovered with the 0.9-meter WIYN telescope (left) at Kitt Peak

=== Name ===
The largest primary component of the triple system is named after Lempo from Finnish mythology. (Note: The primary's namesake is also used to refer to the entire triple system.) Originally worshiped as the god of love and fertility, he was later depicted as a devil after Christianity came to Finland. Lempo brought down the hero Väinämöinen with the help of his two demon cohorts Hiisi and Paha, whose names denominate the smaller inner and outer components, respectively. The names were chosen on behalf of astronomer Bryan J. Holler. The official naming citation was published by the Minor Planet Center on 5 October 2017. Hiisi shares its name with the exoplanet HAT-P-38b.

== Triple system ==
Size comparison of the Lempo system's components

Orbit diagram of the Lempo triple system

=== Lempo ===
Lempo is a hierarchical triple system consisting of a central primary, which is itself a binary system of two similarly-sized components (Lempo and Hiisi), and a small satellite on a wide and eccentric circumbinary orbit (Paha). The structure of the hierarchy is discerned by denoting the apparent Lempo–Hiisi primary with the letter A and the smaller, outer companion Paha with the letter B; the individual primary components Lempo and Hiisi are distinguished as A1 and A2, respectively. The three components ordered from largest to smallest are Lempo, Hiisi, and Paha.

Assuming spherical shapes with a uniform bulk density for all components, the system mass estimated based on the motion of Paha is (12.75±0.06)×10^{18} kg. The orbital motion of the Lempo–Hiisi components gives somewhat a higher estimated mass of (14.20±0.05)×10^{18} kg. This discrepancy is probably related to unaccounted gravitational interactions of the components in a complex triple system.

Lempo is one of the only three known trans-Neptunian multiple systems with more than two confirmed components; the other two are the dwarf planets Pluto and Haumea. Eris, Quaoar, and 148780 Altjira may also have more than two components, but this is currently unconfirmed. The binary Kuiper belt object 385446 Manwë is suspected to have once been a hierarchical triple system similar to Lempo, but the orbit of its inner binary evolved by tides and became a contact binary. 58534 Logos is also thought to be a contact binary triple system.

=== Hiisi ===
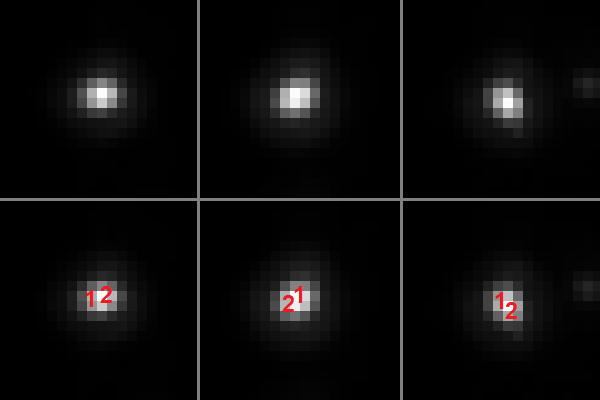
Hubble images of the Lempo–Hiisi system, with the two components marked "1" and "2"

Comparison of mean separation distances and diameters of trans-Neptunian close binaries, including Lempo–Hiisi

Hiisi, formally designated (47171) Lempo II, is the inner, second-largest component of the Lempo triple system, discovered last among the three. Together with the primary component Lempo, it forms the central binary Lempo–Hiisi which the outer component Paha revolves around. The existence of a third, inner component (or second companion) in the Lempo system was first hypothesized in 2006 by John Stansberry and collaborators, who noted that the primary seemed to have an unusually low density. Further evidence to the existence of an inner component was posited by Seth Jacobson and Jean-Luc Margot in October 2007, who noticed a distinct elongation of the primary in Hubble images. The binarity of the Lempo primary was eventually confirmed in a more extensive analysis of Hubble images by Susan Benecchi, Keith Noll, Will Grundy and Hal Levison in 2009.

Due to complex discovery circumstances involving different independent groups of researchers, Hiisi did not have a formal provisional designation signifying the year of its first observation or discovery. Instead, it was unofficially designated "component A2" in scientific literature for being the smaller component of the central Lempo–Hiisi binary. It eventually received its permanent satellite designation and name while the larger, first component A1 maintained the name Lempo on 5 October 2017.

The separation between the two components is only about half the diffraction limit of Hubble, making it impossible to fully resolve the system. Instead, it appears elongated in Hubble images, revealing its binary nature. This central pair has a semi-major axis of around 867 km and a period of about 1.9 days. Assuming equal albedos of about 0.079, Lempo and Hiisi are approximately 272+17
−19 km and 251+16
−17 km in diameter, respectively. Assuming a uniform density for all components, the mass of Hiisi itself 5.273×10^{18} kg.

=== Paha ===
The Lempo system imaged by Hubble from 2003 to 2006

Paha, formally designated (47171) Lempo I, is the smaller, outer component of the Lempo triple system. It was discovered on 8 December 2001 by astronomers Chadwick Trujillo and Michael Brown using the Hubble Space Telescope's Space Telescope Imaging Spectrograph to survey for binary trans-Neptunian objects. The discovery was reported in an IAU Circular notice published by the International Astronomical Union 10 January 2002. The confirmation of Paha in archival 4 October 2001 observations from the Lick Observatory's Shane telescope adaptive optics system was reported in a follow-up IAU Circular published on 24 January 2002.

Paha previously had the temporary provisional designation S/2001 (1999 TC_{36}) 1 before it was changed to S/2001 (47171) 1 after Lempo was numbered. Being the smaller, outer component on a circumbinary orbit around the central Lempo–Hiisi binary, it was sometimes designated "component B" in scientific literature. It received its permanent satellite designation and name alongside Lempo and Hiisi on 5 October 2017.

In unfiltered visual wavelengths, Paha appears 2.2 magnitudes dimmer than the primary on average, corresponding to an individual apparent magnitude of 22.6. The satellite has an estimated diameter of 132+8
−9 km and a semi-major axis of 7411±12 km, orbiting its primary in 50.302±0.001 d. It is estimated to only have a mass of about 7.67×10^{17} kg.

== System dynamics ==
The orbital dynamics of the Lempo system are highly complex and could not be modelled with solely Keplerian dynamics. Many crucial parameters such as initial spin states and shapes of the individual components are unknown and thus could not adequately model the dynamics of the Lempo system as a three-body problem without leading to significantly chaotic behavior. In a 2018 dynamical study, Alexandre Correia found that simulated models using realistically assumed spin states and shapes failed to explain the presently eccentric mutual orbit of the inner Lempo–Hiisi binary, even with the inclusion of eccentricity-damping tidal forces. Correia concluded that the present orbits, spin states and shapes of all components of the Lempo system needed to be remeasured to a greater precision before a more sophisticated model could be developed.

== Origin ==
There exist two main hypotheses on how this triple system formed. The first one is a giant collision and subsequent reaccretion in the disc. The second one is gravitational capture of a third object by a preexisting binary. The similar sizes of Lempo and Hiisi favor the latter hypothesis.

== Physical characteristics ==
The combined observations by the infrared Spitzer Space Telescope, Herschel Space Telescope and the Hubble Space Telescope (HST) make it possible to estimate the sizes of the system's components and consequently provide the range of possible values for the objects' bulk density. The single-body diameter (effective system size) of Lempo is currently estimated at 393.1+25.2
−26.8 km.

The very low estimated density of 0.3–0.8 g/cm^{3} obtained in 2006 (when the system was thought to be a binary) would require an unusually high porosity of 50–75%, assuming an equal mixture of rock and ice. The direct measurement of visible fluxes of all three components of the system in 2009 by the HST has resulted in an improved average density of 0.532+0.317
−0.211 g/cm^{3} confirming the earlier conclusion that the object is probably a rubble pile. The density was revised up to 0.64+0.15
−0.11 g/cm^{3} in 2012 when new information from the Herschel became available. For a bulk density in the range 1–2 g/cm^{3} the porosity is in the range 36–68%, again confirming that the object is a rubble pile.

Lempo has a very red spectral slope in visible light and a flat spectrum in near infrared. There is also a weak absorption feature near the wavelength of 2 μm, probably caused by water ice. The best model reproducing the near infrared spectrum includes tholins, crystalline water ice, and serpentine as surface materials. These results are for the integrated spectrum of all three components of the system.

== Exploration ==
The Lempo system has been considered for future exploration due to its unusual configuration. Lempo was suggested as a target for New Horizons 2, a proposed twin of its namesake that would fly by Jupiter, Uranus, and up to four KBOs.

== See also ==
- Minor-planet moon § Trans-Neptunian objects
- List of trans-Neptunian objects
- 58534 Logos – a contact binary and potential triple system in the cold classical Kuiper belt
- 148780 Altjira – another potential triple system in the cold classical Kuiper belt
- (523764) 2014 WC510 – a binary plutino
