= Huya =

Huya may refer to:

- Huya (mythology), the rain god of the Wayuu people of Venezuela and Colombia
- Huya (noble), an Egyptian official during the reign of Akhenaten, Egypt's 18th dynasty
- 38628 Huya, a plutino discovered in 2000, named after the Wayuu rain god Huya

== See also ==
- Huya Live, a live streaming service in China
- HUYA Bioscience International, a biotech consulting firm founded by Mireille Gingras
