= Thorondor =

Thorondor may refer to:

- Thorondor (Middle-earth), the Lord of Eagles in Tolkien's Middle-earth
- Thorondor (moon), the only known moon of the trans-Neptunian object Manwë
