= Manwë =

Manwë refers to:

- Manwë (Middle-earth), the husband of the Elvish goddess Varda in Tolkien's mythology
- 385446 Manwë, a binary Kuiper belt object
