= List of named minor planets: 100000–149999 =

This is a partial list of named minor planets in numerical order. It contains a total of 1,015 entries as of 19 October 2026. Minor planets for which no article exist are displayed in grey color and redirect to the list of minor planets (see List of minor planets § Main index).

== From 100,000 to 149,999 ==
- 100000 Astronautica
- 100007 Peters
- 100015 Sutcliffe
- 100016 Petebest
- 100019 Gregorianik
- 100027 Hannaharendt
- 100028 von Canstein
- 100029 Varnhagen
- 100033 Taizé
- 100045 Kirchherr
- 100046 Worms
- 100047 Leobaeck
- 100049 Césarann
- 100050 Carloshernandez
- 100051 Davidhernandez
- 100053 Danstinebring
- 100077 Tertzakian
- 100084 Gußmann
- 100122 Alpes-Maritimes
- 100133 Demosthenes
- 100229 Jeanbailly
- 100231 Monceau
- 100266 Sadamisaki
- 100267 JAXA
- 100268 Rosenthal
- 100292 Harmandir
- 100308 ČAS
- 100309 Misuzukaneko
- 100416 Syang
- 100417 Philipglass
- 100433 Hyakusyuko
- 100434 Jinyilian
- 100445 Pisa
- 100456 Chichén Itzá
- 100483 NAOJ
- 100485 Russelldavies
- 100519 Bombig
- 100553 Dariofo
- 100596 Perrett
- 100600 Davidfossé
- 100604 Lundy
- 100641 Cledassou
- 100675 Chuyanakahara
- 100691 Hasetoshitsuka
- 100726 Marcoiozzi
- 100728 Kamenice n Lipou
- 100731 Ara Pacis
- 100732 Blankavalois
- 100733 Annafalcká
- 100734 Annasvídnická
- 100735 Alpomořanská
- 100897 Piatra Neamt
- 100924 Luctuymans
- 100934 Marthanussbaum
- 100936 Mekong
- 100940 Maunder
- 101101 Carmichael
- 101331 Sjöström
- 101383 Karloff
- 101432 Adamwest
- 101461 Dunedin
- 101462 Tahupotiki
- 101491 Grahamcrombie
- 101493 Sergiofoparri
- 101534 Carlobenna
- 101713 Marston
- 101721 Emanuelfritsch
- 101722 Pursell
- 101723 Finger
- 101777 Robhoskins
- 101781 Gojira
- 101810 Beiyou
- 101811 Jakobkaup
- 101813 Elizabethmarston
- 101902 Gisellaluccone
- 101955 Bennu
- 101960 Molau
- 101961 Augustklipstein
- 102211 Angelofaggiano
- 102216 Carona
- 102224 Raffaellolena
- 102234 Olivebyrne
- 102536 Luanenjie
- 102617 Allium
- 102618 Marionacaldentey
- 102619 Crespino
- 102621 Goshinosato
- 103015 Gianfrancomarcon
- 103016 Davidčástek
- 103220 Kwongchuikuen
- 103421 Laurmatt
- 103422 Laurisirén
- 103460 Dieterherrmann
- 103560 Peate
- 103733 Bernardharris
- 103734 Winstonscott
- 103737 Curbeam
- 103738 Stephaniewilson
- 103739 Higginbotham
- 103740 Budinger
- 103770 Wilfriedlang
- 103966 Luni
- 104020 Heilbronn
- 104052 Zachery
- 104210 Leeupton
- 104698 Alvindrew
- 104896 Schwanden
- 105211 Sanden
- 105222 Oscarsaa
- 105613 Odedaharonson
- 105675 Kamiukena
- 106537 McCarthy
- 106545 Colanduno
- 106817 Yubangtaek
- 106869 Irinyi
- 107052 Aquincum
- 107054 Daniela
- 107074 Ansonsylva
- 107223 Ripero
- 107379 Johnlogan
- 107393 Bernacca
- 107396 Swangin
- 107561 Quinn
- 107638 Wendyfreedman
- 107805 Saibi
- 108072 Odifreddi
- 108096 Melvin
- 108097 Satcher
- 108113 Maza
- 108140 Alir
- 108201 Di Blasi
- 108205 Baccipaolo
- 108382 Karencilevitz
- 108496 Sullenberger
- 108702 Michelefoparri
- 108720 Kamikuroiwa
- 108952 Ilariacinelli
- 108953 Pieraerts
- 109097 Hamuy
- 109330 Clemente
- 109435 Giraud
- 109573 Mishasmirnov
- 109712 Giger
- 109879 Letelier
- 110026 Hamill
- 110073 Leeonki
- 110074 Lamchunhei
- 110077 Pujiquanshan
- 110288 Libai
- 110289 Dufu
- 110293 Oia
- 110294 Victoriaharbour
- 110295 Elcalafate
- 110296 Luxor
- 110297 Yellowriver
- 110298 Deceptionisland
- 110299 Iceland
- 110300 Abusimbel
- 110393 Rammstein
- 110404 Itoemi
- 110405 Itoyumi
- 110408 Nakajima
- 110416 Cardille
- 110625 Feryalözel
- 110627 Psaltis
- 110702 Titostagno
- 110742 Tetuokudo
- 110743 Hirobumi
- 111468 Alba Regia
- 111558 Barrett
- 111561 Giovanniallevi
- 111570 Ágasvár
- 111571 Bebevio
- 111594 Ráktanya
- 111660 Jimgray
- 111661 Mamiegeorge
- 111696 Helenorman
- 111818 Deforest
- 111913 Davidgans
- 111933 Alphonsetardif
- 112233 Kammerer
- 112313 Larrylines
- 112320 Danielegardiol
- 112328 Klinkerfues
- 112337 Francescaguerra
- 112338 Seneseconte
- 112339 Pimpa
- 112340 Davidegaddi
- 112483 Missjudy
- 112492 Annacipriani
- 112527 Panarese
- 112656 Gines
- 112660 Artlucas
- 112797 Grantjudy
- 112798 Kelindsey
- 112900 Tonyhoffman
- 112947 Marinascatena
- 113202 Kisslászló
- 113203 Szabó
- 113208 Lea
- 113210 Petrfatka
- 113213 Marcoolmo
- 113214 Vinkó
- 113219 Thomasmazzi
- 113237 Samucavicchioli
- 113256 Prüm
- 113333 Tyler
- 113355 Gessler
- 113388 Davidmartinez
- 113390 Helvetia
- 113394 Niebur
- 113395 Curtniebur
- 113405 Itomori
- 113415 Rauracia
- 113461 McCay
- 113620 Valelucarotti
- 113621 Danielafaggi
- 113622 Serafinacarpino
- 113623 Stefanovoglino
- 113626 Centorenazzo
- 113659 Faltona
- 113661 Augustodaolio
- 113671 Sacromonte
- 113673 Bettystrickland
- 113683 Robertoornella
- 113684 Giannagianni
- 113949 Bahcall
- 113950 Donbaldwin
- 113951 Artdavidsen
- 113952 Schramm
- 114022 Bizyaev
- 114023 Harvanek
- 114024 Scotkleinman
- 114025 Krzesinski
- 114026 Emalanushenko
- 114027 Malanushenko
- 114094 Irvpatterson
- 114096 Haroldbier
- 114156 Eamonlittle
- 114239 Bermarmi
- 114608 Emanuelepace
- 114611 Valeriobocci
- 114612 Sandrasavaglio
- 114613 Antoninobrosio
- 114649 Jeanneacker
- 114659 Sajnovics
- 114689 Tomstevens
- 114703 North Dakota
- 114705 Tamayo
- 114725 Gordonwalker
- 114735 Irenemagni
- 114738 Melissa
- 114739 Tripodi
- 114740 Luigitatto
- 114828 Ricoromita
- 114829 Chierchia
- 114987 Tittel
- 114990 Szeidl
- 114991 Balázs
- 115015 Chang Díaz
- 115051 Safaeinili
- 115058 Tassantal
- 115059 Nagykároly
- 115210 Mutvicens
- 115254 Fényi
- 115312 Whither
- 115326 Wehinger
- 115331 Shrylmiles
- 115434 Kellyfast
- 115449 Robson
- 115477 Brantanica
- 115492 Watonga
- 115561 Frankherbert
- 115801 Punahou
- 115885 Ganz
- 115891 Scottmichael
- 115950 Kocherpeter
- 116162 Sidneygutierrez
- 116166 Andrémaeder
- 116446 McDermid
- 116903 Jeromeapt
- 116939 Jonstewart
- 117020 Janeconlin
- 117032 Davidlane
- 117086 Lóczy
- 117093 Umbria
- 117156 Altschwendt
- 117240 Zhytomyr
- 117329 Spencer
- 117350 Saburo
- 117381 Lindaweiland
- 117384 Halharrison
- 117385 Maughan
- 117386 Thomasschlapkohl
- 117387 Javiercerna
- 117388 Jamiemoore
- 117390 Stephanegendron
- 117406 Blasgámez
- 117411 Adellehelble
- 117413 Ramonycajal
- 117430 Achosyx
- 117435 Severochoa
- 117439 Rosner
- 117506 Wildberg
- 117539 Celletti
- 117562 Jeffreyferguson
- 117563 Hollyoscarson
- 117565 Alanstrauss
- 117568 Yadame
- 117569 Rileyharris
- 117572 Hutsebaut
- 117581 Devinschrader
- 117582 Kenjikawai
- 117586 Twilatho
- 117595 Jemmadavidson
- 117596 Richardkuhns
- 117610 Keithmahoney
- 117614 Hannahmclain
- 117640 Millsellie
- 117652 Joséaponte
- 117657 Jamieelsila
- 117703 Ochoa
- 117704 Lopez-Alegria
- 117711 Degenfeld
- 117712 Podmaniczky
- 117713 Kövesligethy
- 117714 Kiskartal
- 117715 Carlkirby
- 117736 Sherrod
- 117757 Waltermassey
- 117781 Jamesfisher
- 117783 Indik
- 117852 Constance
- 117874 Picodelteide
- 117993 Zambujal
- 117997 Irazú
- 118102 Rinjani
- 118172 Vorgebirge
- 118173 Barmen
- 118178 Rinckart
- 118194 Sabinagarroni
- 118214 Agnesediboemia
- 118230 Sado
- 118233 Gfrancoferrini
- 118235 Federico
- 118401 LINEAR
- 118418 Yangmei
- 118554 Reedtimmer
- 118768 Carlosnoriega
- 118769 Olivas
- 118829 Jindřichštreit
- 118945 Rikhill
- 119195 Margaretgreer
- 119248 Corbally
- 119424 Russelldurkee
- 119602 Italodimaria
- 119846 Goshiina
- 119890 Zamka
- 119961 Nastasi
- 119967 Daniellong
- 119993 Acabá
- 120038 Franlainsher
- 120040 Pagliarini
- 120074 Bass
- 120097 Janniksinner
- 120098 Telmopievani
- 120101 Aureladina
- 120102 Lucabenetti
- 120103 Dolero
- 120112 Elizabethacton
- 120120 Kankelborg
- 120121 Libbyadelman
- 120131 MAVEN
- 120141 Lucaslara
- 120153 Hoekenga
- 120174 Jeffjenny
- 120186 Suealeman
- 120188 Amyaqueche
- 120191 Tombagg
- 120196 Kevinballou
- 120208 Brentbarbee
- 120214 Danteberdeguez
- 120215 Kevinberry
- 120218 Richardberry
- 120285 Brentbos
- 120299 Billlynch
- 120308 Deebradel
- 120324 Falusandrás
- 120347 Salacia
- 120349 Kalas
- 120350 Richburns
- 120351 Beckymasterson
- 120352 Gordonwong
- 120353 Katrinajackson
- 120354 Mikejones
- 120361 Guido
- 120364 Stevecooley
- 120367 Grabow
- 120368 Phillipcoulter
- 120372 Bridgetburns
- 120375 Kugel
- 120405 Svyatylivka
- 120452 Schombert
- 120460 Hambach
- 120461 Gandhi
- 120462 Amanohashidate
- 120481 Johannwalter
- 120569 Huangrunqian
- 120643 Rudimandl
- 120730 Zhouyouyuan
- 120735 Ogawakiyoshi
- 120741 Iijimayuichi
- 120942 Rendafuzhong
- 121001 Liangshanxichang
- 121007 Jiaxingnanhu
- 121008 Michellecrigger
- 121014 Neida
- 121016 Christopharnold
- 121018 Malvinabillères
- 121019 Minodamato
- 121022 Galliano
- 121032 Wadesisler
- 121089 Vyšší Brod
- 121103 Ericneilsen
- 121121 Koyoharugotoge
- 121132 Garydavis
- 121133 Kenflurchick
- 121211 Nikeshadavis
- 121232 Zerin
- 121236 Adrianagutierrez
- 121237 Zachdolch
- 121313 Tamsin
- 121315 Mikelentz
- 121327 Andreweaker
- 121328 Devlynrfennell
- 121329 Getzandanner
- 121330 Colbygoodloe
- 121331 Savannahsalazar
- 121332 Jasonhair
- 121336 Žiarnadhronom
- 121339 Otabekburkhonov
- 121352 Taylorhale
- 121468 Msovinskihaskell
- 121469 Sarahaugh
- 121479 Hendershot
- 121480 Dolanhighsmith
- 121481 Reganhoward
- 121483 Griffinjayne
- 121486 Sarahkirby
- 121505 Andrewliounis
- 121506 Chrislorentson
- 121536 Brianburt
- 121537 Lorenzdavid
- 121540 Jamesmarsh
- 121542 Alindamashiku
- 121546 Straulino
- 121547 Fenghuotongxin
- 121557 Paulmason
- 121593 Kevinmiller
- 121594 Zubritsky
- 121608 Mikemoreau
- 121609 Josephnicholas
- 121615 Marknoteware
- 121631 Josephnuth
- 121633 Ronperison
- 121637 Druscillaperry
- 121654 Michaelpryzby
- 121655 Nitapszcolka
- 121656 Jamesrogers
- 121659 Blairrussell
- 121715 Katiesalamy
- 121716 Victorsank
- 121717 Josephschepis
- 121718 Ashleyscroggins
- 121719 Georgeshaw
- 121725 Aphidas
- 121756 Sotomejias
- 121817 Szatmáry
- 121865 Dauvergne
- 122554 Joséhernández
- 122555 Auñón-Chancellor
- 122632 Riccioli
- 123120 Peternewman
- 123290 Manoa
- 123647 Tomáško
- 123794 Deadwood
- 123818 Helenzier
- 123852 Jánboďa
- 123860 Davederrick
- 124075 Ketelsen
- 124104 Balcony
- 124114 Bergersen
- 124143 Joséluiscorral
- 124192 Molėtai
- 124368 Nickphoenix
- 124398 Iraklisimonia
- 124450 Shyamalan
- 124844 Hirotamasao
- 124845 Clinteastwood
- 124852 Cooper
- 125071 Lugosi
- 125076 Michelmayor
- 125371 Vojáček
- 125473 Keisaku
- 125476 Frangarcia
- 125592 Buthiers
- 125718 Jemasalomon
- 126160 Fabienkuntz
- 126161 Piazzano
- 126177 Filippofrontera
- 126183 Larrymitchell
- 126245 Kandókálmán
- 126246 Losignore
- 126247 Laurafaggioli
- 126248 Dariooliviero
- 126249 Gabrielgraur
- 126315 Bláthy
- 126444 Wylie
- 126445 Prestonreeves
- 126578 Suhhosoo
- 126748 Mariegerbet
- 126749 Johnjones
- 126780 Ivovasiljev
- 126888 Tspitzer
- 126901 Craigstevens
- 126905 Junetveekrem
- 126906 Andykulessa
- 126965 Neri
- 127005 Pratchett
- 127030 Herrington
- 127196 Hanaceplechová
- 127415 Annacalderara
- 127477 Fredalee
- 127515 Nitta
- 127516 Oravetz
- 127517 Kaikepan
- 127545 Crisman
- 127658 Gapers
- 127660 Mauroianeselli
- 127664 Denza
- 127689 Doncapone
- 127737 Ferretti
- 127803 Johnvaneepoel
- 127810 Michaelwright
- 127870 Vigo
- 127933 Shaunoborn
- 127935 Reedmckenna
- 127936 Maia
- 127955 Alexandraradu
- 127965 Ettorecittadini
- 128022 Peterantreasian
- 128027 Bobsandy
- 128036 Rafaelnadal
- 128038 Jimadams
- 128054 Eranyavneh
- 128062 Szrogh
- 128065 Bartbenjamin
- 128166 Carora
- 128177 Griffioen
- 128228 Williammarsh
- 128242 Šmahel
- 128297 Ashlevi
- 128314 Coraliejackman
- 128315 Dereknelson
- 128321 Philipdumont
- 128323 Peterwolff
- 128327 Ericcarranza
- 128341 Dalestanbridge
- 128343 Brianpage
- 128345 Danielbamberger
- 128348 Jasonleonard
- 128372 Danielwibben
- 128373 Kevinjohnson
- 128389 Dougleland
- 128408 Mikehughes
- 128417 Chrismccaa
- 128426 Vekerdi
- 128439 Chriswaters
- 128474 Arbacia
- 128523 Johnmuir
- 128562 Murdin
- 128585 Alfredmaria
- 128586 Jeremias
- 128593 Balfourwhitney
- 128602 Careyparish
- 128604 Markfisher
- 128607 Richhund
- 128608 Chucklove
- 128610 Stasiahabenicht
- 128611 Paulnowak
- 128614 Juliabest
- 128615 Jimharris
- 128622 Rudiš
- 128627 Ottmarsheim
- 128633 Queyras
- 128795 Douglaswalker
- 128882 Jennydebenedetti
- 128895 Bright Spring
- 128925 Conwell
- 129026 Conormcmenamin
- 129050 Lowellcogburn
- 129051 Chrismay
- 129052 Nîmeshdave
- 129053 Derekshannon
- 129060 Huntskretsch
- 129061 Karlfortney
- 129063 Joshwood
- 129064 Jeanneladewig
- 129068 Alexmay
- 129071 Catriegle
- 129073 Sandyfreund
- 129078 Animoo
- 129082 Oliviabillett
- 129092 Snowdonia
- 129095 Martyschmitzer
- 129096 Andrewleung
- 129099 Spoelhof
- 129100 Aaronammons
- 129101 Geoffcollyer
- 129102 Charliecamarotte
- 129108 Kristianwaldorff
- 129114 Oliverwalthall
- 129119 Ericmuhle
- 129125 Chrisvoth
- 129137 Hippolochos
- 129138 Williamfrost
- 129146 Stevenglenn
- 129148 Sheilahaggard
- 129149 Richwitherspoon
- 129151 Angelaboggs
- 129152 Jaystpierre
- 129154 Georgesondecker
- 129158 Michaelmellman
- 129160 Ericpeters
- 129161 Mykallefevre
- 129165 Kevinstout
- 129167 Dianelambert
- 129172 Jodizareski
- 129173 Mattgoman
- 129176 Gerardcarter
- 129177 Jeanneeha
- 129185 Jonburroughs
- 129186 Joshgrindlay
- 129187 Danielalfred
- 129188 Dangallagher
- 129196 Mitchbeiser
- 129201 Brandenallen
- 129209 Robertburt
- 129214 Gordoncasto
- 129216 Chloecastle
- 129234 Silly
- 129259 Tapolca
- 129277 Jianxinchen
- 129307 Tomconnors
- 129312 Drouetdaubigny
- 129314 Dathongolish
- 129318 Sarahschlieder
- 129321 Tannercampbell
- 129324 Johnweirich
- 129325 Jedhancock
- 129327 Davehamara
- 129328 Loriharrison
- 129330 Karlharshman
- 129332 Markhunten
- 129333 Ashleylancaster
- 129335 Edwardlittle
- 129338 Andrewlowman
- 129342 Ependes
- 129452 Ashleydawn
- 129453 Madeleinenettie
- 129550 Fukuten
- 129555 Armazones
- 129561 Chuhachi
- 129564 Christy
- 129595 Vand
- 129743 Grimaldi
- 129773 Catmerrill
- 129801 Tommcmahon
- 129807 Stefanodougherty
- 129811 Stacyoliver
- 129876 Stevenpeterson
- 129879 Tishasaltzman
- 129881 Chucksee
- 129882 Ustica
- 129898 Sanfordselznick
- 129954 Corksauve
- 129955 Eriksyrstad
- 129962 Williamverts
- 129963 Marvinwalthall
- 129966 Michaelward
- 129968 Mitchwhiteley
- 129969 Bradwilliams
- 129973 Michaeldaly
- 129980 Catherinejohnson
- 129982 Jeffseabrook
- 129985 Jimfreemantle
- 129988 Camerondickinson
- 130006 Imranaslam
- 130007 Frankteti
- 130066 Timhaltigin
- 130067 Marius-Phaneuf
- 130069 Danielgaudreau
- 130071 Claudebrunet
- 130072 Ilincaignat
- 130078 Taschner
- 130088 Grantcunningham
- 130089 Saadatanwar
- 130090 Heatherbowles
- 130126 Stillmanchase
- 130127 Zoltanfarkas
- 130128 Tarafisher
- 130158 Orsonjohn
- 130161 Iankubik
- 130229 Igorlazbin
- 130249 Markminer
- 130283 Elizabethgraham
- 130314 Williamodonnell
- 130319 Danielpelham
- 130320 Maherrassas
- 131181 Žebrák
- 131186 Pauluckas
- 131245 Bakich
- 131358 Kamolergashev
- 131762 Csonka
- 131763 Donátbánki
- 131764 Clauteodorescu
- 131765 Raphaelschneider
- 131766 Silviaferarra
- 131767 Stefanomancuso
- 132005 Scottmcgregor
- 132329 Tomandert
- 132445 Gaertner
- 132524 APL
- 132661 Carlbaeker
- 132668 Brunobozzetto
- 132718 Kemény
- 132719 Lambey
- 132741 Liliacapocaccia
- 132791 Jeremybauman
- 132792 Scottsmith
- 132798 Kürti
- 132820 Miskotte
- 132824 Galamb
- 132825 Shizu-Mao
- 132874 Latinovits
- 132903 Edgibson
- 132904 Notkin
- 133007 Audreysimmons
- 133008 Snedden
- 133009 Watters
- 133066 Beddingfield
- 133068 Lisaschulze
- 133074 Kenshamordola
- 133077 Jirsík
- 133142 Violapiciu
- 133161 Ruttkai
- 133243 Essen
- 133250 Rubik
- 133280 Bryleen
- 133293 Andrushivka
- 133296 Federicotosi
- 133404 Morogues
- 133432 Sarahnoble
- 133527 Fredearly
- 133528 Ceragioli
- 133536 Alicewhagel
- 133537 Mariomotta
- 133552 Itting-Enke
- 133716 Tomtourville
- 133726 Gateswest
- 133743 Robertwoodward
- 133744 Dellagiustina
- 133745 Danieldrinnon
- 133746 Tonyferro
- 133747 Robertofurfaro
- 133753 Teresamullen
- 133756 Carinajohnson
- 133773 Lindsaykeller
- 133774 Johnkidd
- 133782 Saraknutson
- Johnphelps
- 133814 Wenjengko
- 133832 Loveridge
- 133834 Erinmorton
- 133850 Heatherroper
- 133854 Wargetz
- 133861 Debrawilmer
- 133874 Jonnazucarelli
- 133889 Nicholasmills
- 133891 Jaesubhong
- 133892 Benkhaldoun
- 134003 Ingridgalinsky
- 134008 Davidhammond
- 134019 Nathanmogk
- 134027 Deanbooher
- 134028 Mikefitzgibbon
- 134034 Bloomenthal
- 134036 Austincummings
- 134039 Stephaniebarnes
- 134040 Beaubierhaus
- 134044 Chrisshinohara
- 134050 Rebeccaghent
- 134063 Damianhammond
- 134069 Miyo
- 134072 Sharonhooven
- 134081 Johnmarshall
- 134087 Symeonplatts
- 134088 Brettperkins
- 134091 Jaysoncowley
- 134092 Lindaleematthias
- 134099 Rexengelhardt
- 134105 Josephfust
- 134109 Britneyburch
- 134112 Jeremyralph
- 134124 Subirachs
- 134125 Shaundaly
- 134127 Basher
- 134130 Apáczai
- 134131 Skipowens
- 134134 Kristoferdrozd
- 134135 Steigerwald
- 134138 Laurabayley
- 134146 Pronoybiswas
- 134150 Bralower
- 134160 Pluis
- 134169 Davidcarte
- 134174 Jameschen
- 134178 Markchodas
- 134180 Nirajinamdar
- 134244 De Young
- 134292 Edwardhall
- 134329 Cycnos
- 134340 Pluto
- 134346 Pinatubo
- 134348 Klemperer
- 134369 Sahara
- 134402 Ieshimatoshiaki
- 134419 Hippothous
- 135041 Lorenzofranco
- 135069 Gagnereau
- 135268 Haigneré
- 135561 Tautvaišienė
- 135662 Michelacastello
- 135695 Dragomirescu
- 135799 Ráczmiklós
- 135889 Trisdalcanton
- 135890 Robertodalzotto
- 135910 Umbertorepetti
- 135978 Agüeros
- 135979 Allam
- 135980 Scottanderson
- 135991 Danarmstrong
- 136100 Angelamisiano
- 136108 Haumea
- 136197 Johnandrews
- 136199 Eris
- 136273 Csermely
- 136367 Gierlinger
- 136432 Allenlunsford
- 136472 Makemake
- 136473 Bakosgáspár
- 136518 Opitz
- 136557 Neleus
- 136666 Seidel
- 136743 Echigo
- 136795 Tatsunokingo
- 136803 Calliemorgan
- 136818 Selqet
- 136824 Nonamikeiko
- 136825 Slawitschek
- 136848 Kevanpooler
- 136922 Brianbauer
- 137039 Lisiguang
- 137052 Tjelvar
- 137066 Gellért-hegy
- 137082 Maurobachini
- 137165 Annis
- 137166 Netabahcall
- 137217 Racah
- 137315 Wangshouwu
- 137632 Ramsauer
- 138016 Kerribeisser
- 138200 Anderswall
- 138221 Baldry
- 138445 Westenburger
- 138626 Tanguybertrand
- 138979 Černice
- 139028 Haynald
- 139233 Henych
- 140038 Kurushima
- 140602 Berlind
- 140620 Raoulwallenberg
- 140628 Klaipėda
- 140980 Blanton
- 141128 Ghyoot
- 141414 Bochanski
- 141496 Bartkevičius
- 141772 Lucapeyron
- 141995 Rossbeyer
- 142014 Neirinck
- 142020 Xinghaishiyan
- 142084 Jamesdaniel
- 142091 Omerblaes
- 142106 Nengshun
- 142275 Simonyi
- 142291 Dompfaff
- 142368 Majden
- 142369 Johnhodges
- 142401 Simonhook
- 142408 Trebur
- 142558 Rosarno
- 142562 Graetz
- 142752 Boroski
- 142753 Briegel
- 142754 Brunner
- 142755 Castander
- 142756 Chiu
- 142757 Collinge
- 142758 Connolly
- 142759 Covey
- 142760 Csabai
- 142822 Czarapata
- 143048 Margaretpenston
- 143139 Kučáková
- 143579 Dérimiksa
- 143622 Robertbloch
- 143626 Sevialdo
- 143641 Sapello
- 143750 Shyamkumar
- 144096 Wiesendangen
- 144296 Steviewonder
- 144303 Mirellabreschi
- 144333 Marcinkiewicz
- 144362 Swantner
- 144386 Emmabirath
- 144496 Reingard
- 144552 Jackiesue
- 144633 Georgecarroll
- 144692 Katemary
- 144716 Scotttucker
- 144752 Plungė
- 144769 Zachariassen
- 144907 Whitehorne
- 145062 Hashikami
- 145075 Zipernowsky
- 145078 Katherinejohnson
- 145166 Leojematt
- 145174 Irenejoliotcurie
- 145445 Le Floch
- 145451 Rumina
- 145452 Ritona
- 145456 Sab
- 145475 Rehoboth
- 145488 Kaczendre
- 145491 Larakaufmann
- 145523 Lulin
- 145534 Jhongda
- 145545 Wensayling
- 145546 Suiqizhong
- 145558 Raiatea
- 145559 Didiermüller
- 145562 Zurbriggen
- 145566 Andreasphilipp
- 145588 Sudongpo
- 145593 Xántus
- 145709 Rocknowar
- 145732 Kanmon
- 145768 Petiška
- 145782 Mattiabaraldi
- 145820 Valeromeo
- 145962 Lacchini
- 145966 Alessandroilari
- 146040 Alicebowman
- 146268 Jennipolakis
- 146442 Dwaynebrown
- 146921 Michaelbuckley
- 146985 Yakelinromero
- 147397 Bobhazel
- 147421 Gárdonyi
- 147595 Gojkomitić
- 147693 Piccioni
- 147703 Madras
- 147704 Gartenberg
- 147736 Raxavinic
- 147745 Novemberkelly
- 147766 Elisatoffoli
- 147918 Chiayi
- 147971 Nametoko
- 148081 Sunjiadong
- 148342 Carverbierson
- 148384 Dalcanton
- 148525 Gipieroconsigli
- 148604 Shobbrook
- 148707 Dodelson
- 148780 Altjira
- 149113 Stewartbushman
- 149115 Lauriecantillo
- 149157 Stephencarr
- 149160 Geojih
- 149163 Stevenconard
- 149195 Lucianaziino
- 149243 Dorothynorton
- 149244 Kriegh
- 149270 Andreacimatti
- 149528 Simónrodríguez
- 149573 Mamorudoi
- 149728 Klostermann
- 149831 Okeke
- 149865 Michelhernandez
- 149884 Radebeul
- 149951 Hildakowalski
- 149952 Susanhamann
- 149955 Maron
- 149968 Trondal
back to top

== See also ==
- List of minor planet discoverers
- List of observatory codes
- Meanings of minor planet names § Index
