= 38628 Huya =

Binary trans-Neptunian object

- Huya and its moon, imaged by the Hubble Space Telescope on 6 May 2012

Discovery
- Discovered by: Ignacio R. Ferrín et al.
- Discovery site: Llano del Hato Obs.
- Discovery date: 10 March 2000

Designations
- Pronunciation: /huːˈjɑː/ hoo-YAH
- Named after: Huya
- Alternative designations: 2000 EB_{173}
- Minor planet category: TNO · plutino Kozai res. · distant

Orbital characteristics (barycentric)
- Epoch 25 February 2023 (JD 2460000.5)
- Uncertainty parameter 1
- Observation arc: 28 yr
- Earliest precovery date: 9 April 1996
- Aphelion: 50.295 AU
- Perihelion: 28.532 AU
- Semi-major axis: 39.413 AU
- Eccentricity: 0.27608
- Orbital period (sidereal): 247.28 yr (90,318 d)
- Mean anomaly: 11.695°
- Mean motion: 0° 0^{m} 14.349^{s} / day
- Inclination: 15.474°
- Longitude of ascending node: 169.323°
- Time of perihelion: 14 December 2014
- Argument of perihelion: 67.882°
- Known satellites: 1
- Uranus MOID: 11.06 AU (1.65 billion km)
- Neptune MOID: 1.52 AU (227 million km) (Note: A strong 3:2 resonance with Neptune prevents Huya from getting this close.)

Physical characteristics
- Mean diameter: 414.7±0.9 km (primary; volume equiv.) (Note: Volume-equivalent diameter of Huya calculated from $D = 2R = 2\sqrt[3]{abc}$, where $a = b = 218.05 \pm 0.11 km$ is Huya's equatorial radius and $c = 187.5 \pm 2.4 km$ is Huya's polar radius. Uncertainty is calculated via error propagation.)
- Equatorial radius: 218.05±0.11 km
- Polar radius: 187.5±2.4 km (if oblate)
- Flattening: 0.14±0.01
- Volume: 3.73×10^{7} km^{3} (Note: Huya volume calculated from the ellipsoid volume formula $V = \frac{4}{3} \pi abc$. a = b is Huya's equatorial radius and c is Huya's polar radius.)
- Mass: 4.52+0.16 −0.15×10^{19} kg (system) (Note: System mass is the combined mass of the primary and satellite.)
- Mean density: 1.073±0.066 g/cm^{3}
- Synodic rotation period: 6.725±0.006 h
- Geometric albedo: 0.079±0.004 (primary)
- Temperature: 51.7 K (perihelion)
- Spectral type: CO_{2}-type ("double-dip"); IR (moderately red); B−V = 0.96±0.01; V−R = 0.57±0.02; V−I = 1.2±0.02
- Apparent magnitude: 19.8
- Absolute magnitude (H): 5.04±0.03 (system); 5.31±0.03 (primary)

38628 Huya (/huːˈjɑː/ hoo-YAH; provisional designation 2000 EB_{173}) is a binary trans-Neptunian object located in the Kuiper belt, a region of icy objects orbiting beyond Neptune in the outer Solar System. Huya is classified as a plutino, a dynamical class of trans-Neptunian objects with orbits in a 3:2 orbital resonance with Neptune. It was discovered by the Quasar Equatorial Survey Team and was identified by Venezuelan astronomer Ignacio Ferrín in March 2000. It is named after Juyá, the mythological rain god of the Wayuu people native to South America.

Huya's surface is moderately red in color due to the presence of complex organic compounds on its surface. Water ice has been suspected to be also present on its surface, although it has not been directly detected on Huya. Huya is considered to be a mid-sized trans-Neptunian object, with an estimated diameter of about 400 km (250 mi).

Huya has one known natural satellite or moon. The moon is relatively large compared to Huya and is expected to have slowed its rotation, although measurements of Huya's brightness variations have indicated that Huya's rotation may not be synchronous with the moon's orbit.

== History ==
=== Discovery ===
Huya was discovered on 10 March 2000 by a team of astronomers of the Quasar Equatorial Survey Team (QUEST), led by Gustavo Bruzual and Charles Baltay at the Llano del Hato National Astronomical Observatory in Mérida, Venezuela. Huya was first identified by Venezuelan astronomer Ignacio Ferrín during a computer-assisted search through images taken from a six-hour survey of deep-sky objects including quasars and supernovae, using the Llano del Hato National Astronomical Observatory's 1-meter Schmidt telescope on the night of 15 March 2000. At the time of discovery, Huya was located in the constellation of Virgo. (Note: The given equatorial coordinates of Huya during 10 March 2000 is 13^{h} 20^{m} 32.68^{s} and −00° 09′ 06.6″, which is close to the Virgo constellation's coordinates around 13^{h} and 0°.) The subtle movement of Huya was detected by the QUEST's computer program, which was designed to identify moving objects by superimposing multiple images. The discovery team subsequently analyzed earlier images taken from previous QUEST surveys conducted during the same month in order to verify the orbital motion of Huya.

The discovery of Huya was announced by the Minor Planet Center in a Minor Planet Electronic Circular on 3 June 2000. It was given the provisional designation 2000 EB_{173} which indicates its year of discovery, with the first letter further specifying that the discovery took place in the first half of March. The last letter and numbers of its designation indicate that Huya is the 4327th object discovered in the first half of March. At that time, Huya was thought to be one of the largest minor planets in the Solar System due to its apparent magnitude of 20, which is relatively bright for a distant object. Astronomers speculated that Huya could be the second-largest minor planet discovered after Ceres, with a diameter around one-fourth the size of the then-planet Pluto. Baltay, leader of the discovery team and chairman of Yale University's Department of Physics, proclaimed that the discovery was significant because it was the largest object discovered in the Kuiper belt since Pluto in 1930. In an interview on their discovery, Baltay asserted:

The significance of this finding? It's just, Wow! After all these years, we can still find something new in our solar system. Some of it is luck. We looked in the right place. The other is the precision of our instrumentation.

After the announcement of Huya's discovery, the discovery team found precovery images of Huya taken with the Palomar Observatory's Samuel Oschin telescope on 9 April 1996. These precovery images of Huya from Palomar are the earliest known observations of Huya. The precovery images along with subsequent follow-up observations in 2000 extended Huya's observation arc up to four years, which helped refine Huya's orbit. By 2002, Huya was observed 303 times. This was sufficient to accurately determine its orbit, so it was assigned the minor planet number 38628 on 28 March 2002.

=== Name ===
This minor planet is named after the mythological figure Huya (Juyá), the rain god of the Wayuu people indigenous to the Guajira Peninsula of northern Venezuela and Colombia. In Wayuu mythology, Juyá is a hunter who controlled the rain and was married to Pulowi, the female figure related to the wind and dry seasons. Juyá is also associated with the winter and lives in the celestial altitudes beyond the sun. The discovery team led by Ferrín particularly chose the name to represent Venezuela's indigenous peoples that lived in the region where Huya was discovered. Ferrín presumed that Huya had experienced multiple impact events during its formation, which he considered analogous to rain, a trait associated with Juyá.

While searching for names, Ferrín and his team had agreed upon a naming scheme based on indigenous names with traits that are associated with the object's characteristics. Among 20 potential names considered by Ferrín's team, they chose the name Juyá, altered to its equivalent phonetic English spelling Huya. The name was later submitted and proposed to the International Astronomical Union (IAU), which then approved the name in 2003. The Minor Planet Center published the naming citation on 1 May 2003. Although the IAU's present naming convention for minor planets requires objects in the orbital class of plutinos (objects in 3:2 orbital resonance with Neptune) to be named after underworld deities, these guidelines had not yet been established when Huya was named.

== Orbit ==
Polar view of Huya's orbit around the Sun, with the outer planets' orbits shown for comparison.

Huya is a trans-Neptunian object (TNO) in a 2:3 mean-motion orbital resonance with Neptune, meaning that Huya completes two orbits around the Sun for every three orbits completed by Neptune. Due to its 2:3 orbital resonance with Neptune, Huya is classified as a plutino, a dynamical class of objects with orbits similar to that of Pluto. Huya orbits the Sun at an average distance of 39.4 AU (5.89 billion km; 3.66 billion mi), taking 247 years to complete a full orbit. (Note: These orbital elements are expressed in terms of the Solar System Barycenter (SSB) as the frame of reference. Due to planetary perturbations, the Sun revolves around the SSB at non-negligible distances, so heliocentric-frame orbital elements and distances can vary in short timescales as shown in JPL-Horizons.) Huya's orbit is inclined to the ecliptic by 15.5 degrees, slightly less than Pluto's orbital inclination of 17 degrees. It has an elongated orbit with an orbital eccentricity of 0.28. Due to its eccentric orbit, its distance from the Sun varies over the course of its orbit, ranging from 28.5 AU at perihelion (closest distance) to 50.3 AU at aphelion (farthest distance). Like Pluto, Huya's orbital resonance prevents close approaches to Neptune. The minimum orbit intersection distance (MOID) between Huya and Neptune is approximately 1.5 AU, but due to the resonance, the two never come closer than 17 AU of each other.

Huya passed perihelion on 14 December 2014, and is now moving away from the Sun, reaching aphelion on 5 May 2139. As of 2026, Huya is approximately 29.4 AU from the Sun, and will remain inside the orbit of Neptune (which has a semi-major axis of 30.1 AU) until late 2030. It is located in the direction of the constellation Ophiuchus. Simulations by the Deep Ecliptic Survey (DES) show that Huya can acquire a perihelion distance (q_{min}) as small as 27.27 AU over the next 10 million years.

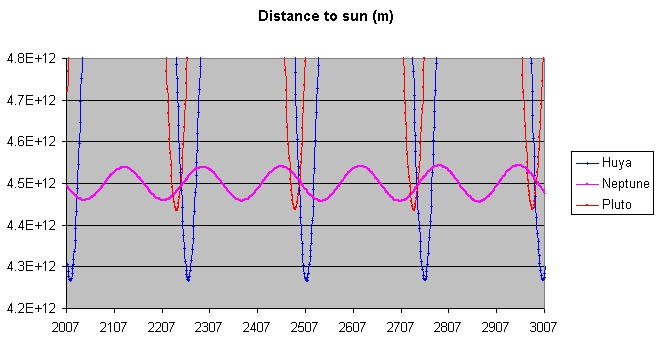
The varying distances of Neptune, Pluto and Huya from the Sun, graphed over a period of one thousand years from 2007 to 3007

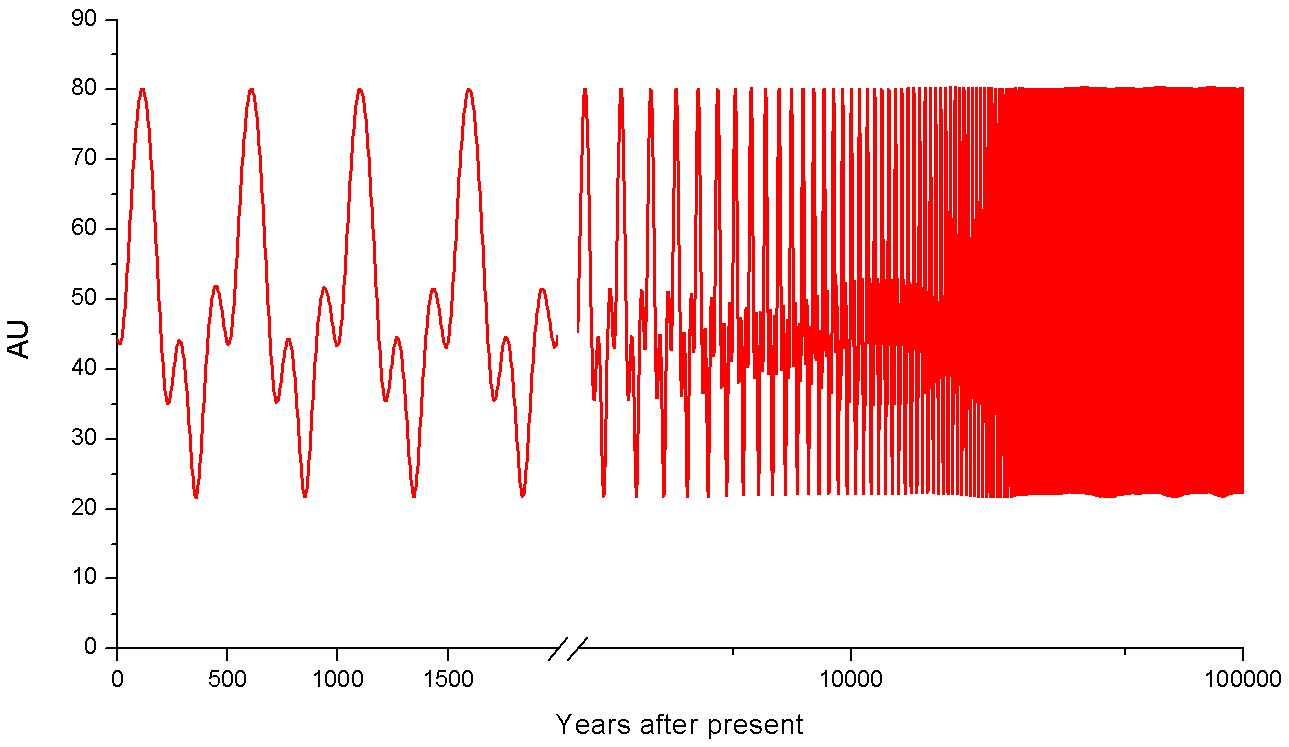
Distance between Huya and Neptune over the next 100,000 years. Due to the 2:3 resonance, Huya never comes closer than 21 AU of Neptune.

Huya's orbit, librating in a 2:3 resonance with Neptune, in a frame co-rotating with Neptune

== Observability ==
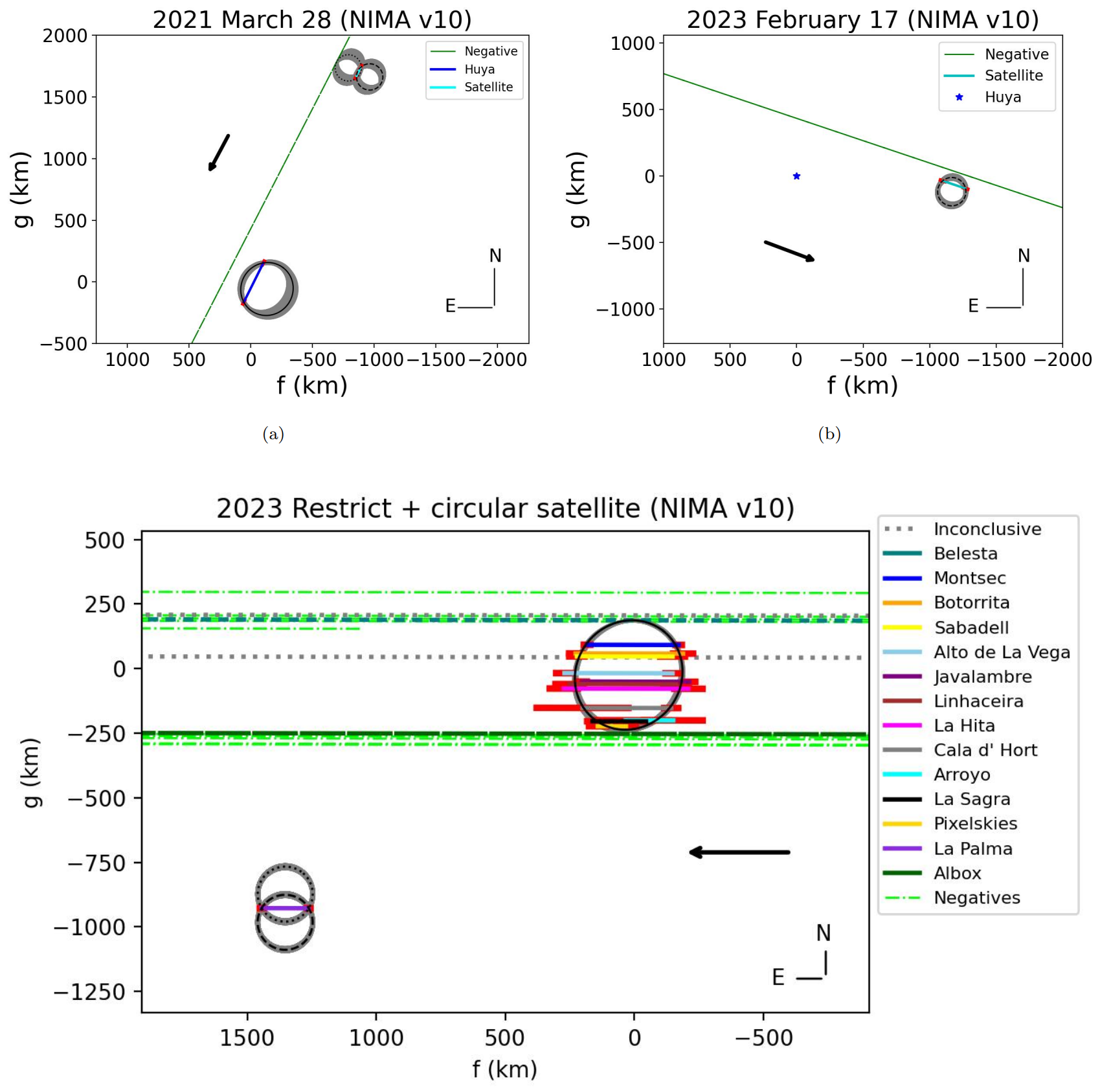
Silhouettes of Huya and its moon revealed by observations from the 28 March 2021 (top left), 17 February 2023 (top right), and 24 June 2023 (bottom) occultations. For each telescope that observed the event, the duration of the occultation detection is represented as a chord (multicolored line) that spans the width of the body's silhouette.

The Huya system's current apparent magnitude, the brightness as seen from Earth, is about 20. Huya comes to opposition every June, when it appears brightest from Earth. As Huya's phase angle approaches zero during opposition, its brightness increases gradually, which indicates it has a low geometric albedo. Huya's low albedo has since been confirmed with measurements of Huya's diameter via thermal emission and occultation observations. Huya's brightness behavior at opposition, or opposition surge, was first studied in 2001; it is the first trans-Neptunian object other than Pluto to have its opposition surge studied. Huya appeared to display very little variability in brightness, with an estimated light curve amplitude of less than 0.097 magnitudes.

=== Occultations ===
Stellar occultations by Huya occur when it passes in front of a star and blocks out its light, causing the star to dim for several seconds until Huya emerges. Observing stellar occultations by Huya can provide accurate measurements for its position, shape, and size. The first successful detection of a stellar occultation by Huya took place on 18 March 2019. The observing occultations for this occultation were favorable as the occulted star was bright (apparent magnitude 11) and the event was observable at central Europe and west Asia, where there were already many telescopes operated by amateur and professional astronomers. A total of 49 telescopes attempted to observe the occultation, with 21 positive detections reported from Romania, Turkey, and Israel. No signs of a possible atmosphere or rings were detected during the occultation, placing an upper limit surface atmospheric pressure of 10 nanobars, an upper limit ring opacity of 2.7%, and an upper limit ring width of 0.1 km (0.062 mi). The moon of Huya was not detected in the occultation.

Additional stellar occultations by the Huya system were observed on 28 March 2021, 17 February 2023, and 24 June 2023. In all three events, the moon of Huya was detected, allowing for the determination of its orbit around Huya. Only one telescope detected the occultation in March 2021 and February 2023, whereas in June 2023 twelve out of the 30 participating telescopes detected the occultation. None of these occultation observations revealed any rings within 9,000 km (5,600 mi) from Huya.

== Physical characteristics ==
History of diameter estimates for Huya
Year of publication	Huya + moon diameter (km) (Note: The combined diameter of Huya and its moon was estimated from the total flux (brightness) of the Huya system in visible light and infrared (thermal emission).)	Huya diameter (km)	Method	Refs
2001	~600		assumed albedo	
2004	<540		thermal (IRAM)	
2008	532.6+24.4 −25.1		thermal (Spitzer)	
2012	438.7+26.5 −25.2		thermal (Herschel)	
2012	384+98 −134		thermal (AKARI)	
2013	458±9.2	406±16	thermal (Spitzer + Herschel)	
2017	458+22 −21		thermal (ALMA)	
2022		411.0±7.3 (area equiv.)	occultation (18 Mar 2019)	
2025		414.7±0.9 (volume equiv.)	occultation (2019 + 2023)	

=== Diameter and shape ===
Results from the March 2019 and June 2023 occultations show that Huya has a flattened shape resembling an ellipse, with an equatorial diameter of 436 km (271 mi). It is not known for certain whether Huya's true shape is an oblate spheroid or a triaxial ellipsoid; slight variations in Huya's shape between the 2019 and 2023 occultations could indicate rotation of a triaxial shape, although these could also be caused by measurement errors or topographic features on Huya. Huya's brightness does not fluctuate enough to suggest a triaxial shape, which leads researchers to conclude that Huya's shape is more likely an oblate spheroid. If Huya has an oblate spheroid shape and its equator lies in the same plane as the orbit of its moon, then Huya's polar diameter would be 375 km (233 mi), about 14% shorter than its equatorial diameter. These oblate spheroid dimensions correspond to a volume-equivalent diameter of 415 km (258 mi). For comparison, Huya is about the size of Saturn's smallest round moon Mimas (396 km or 246 mi) and Neptune's largest non-spherical moon Proteus (416 km or 258 mi).

The diameter of Huya from occultations agrees with 2013 estimates of Huya's diameter from its infrared thermal emission. Before 2013, Huya was thought to be larger because its moon was not known at the time; the moon adds to Huya's overall brightness in visible light and infrared, thus making it seem brighter and larger than it actually is. Even earlier estimates of Huya's diameter proposed around the time of its discovery placed it at around 600 km (370 mi), or one-fourth the diameter of Pluto. These initial diameter estimates led some astronomers to suspect that Huya could be a possible dwarf planet whose shape is rounded by its own gravity, but later estimates have since disproven this.

=== Mass and density ===
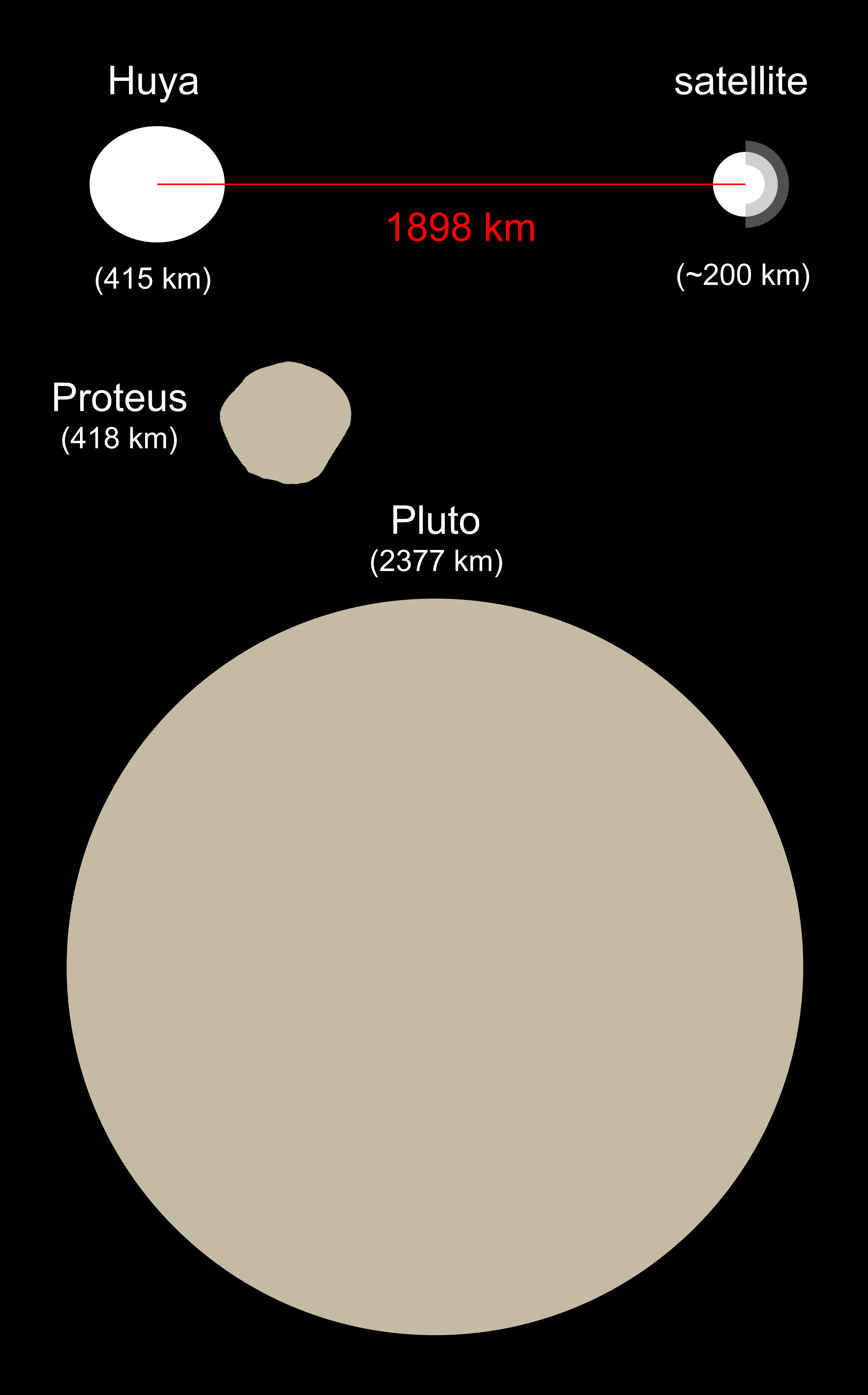
Size comparison of the Huya binary system (white) with Pluto and Neptune's moon Proteus for scale

Since the orbit of Huya's moon is known, the mass and density of Huya can be determined via Kepler's third law. The total mass of Huya and its moon is 4.5×10^{19} kg. If Huya and its moon both have spheroidal shapes with equal densities, then the bulk density of both objects in the Huya system is 1.073 g/cm^{3}. Comparing the density of the Huya system to other binary TNOs with known densities agrees with the observation that densities of TNOs are correlated with their diameter.

Huya's oblate shape, rotation period, and bulk density suggest that it is not in hydrostatic equilibrium—its shape is not rounded by its own gravity. Assuming hydrostatic equilibrium for Huya predicts a low density of 0.768 g/cm^{3}, which in turn would predict an unrealistically high density for its moon in order to keep the Huya system's total mass the same. Huya's lack of hydrostatic equilibrium is expected for its size, as the lower limit diameter for hydrostatic equilibrium in icy objects is estimated at around 450 km (280 mi). At this size, Huya's icy interior is expected to be highly porous, having not experienced sufficient internal heating to undergo melting and differentiation.

=== Surface and spectrum ===
The surface of Huya appears dark and reddish in visible light, having a low visible geometric albedo of 0.079. In Barucci et al.'s four-class taxonomy scheme for TNO color indices, Huya falls under the IR group of TNOs with "moderately red" colors, which is common among objects in the resonant and classical Kuiper belt populations. The dark, reddish color of Huya is caused by complex organic compounds (tholins) on its surface. Tholins are produced by the long-term irradiation of ices by solar radiation and cosmic rays, which chemically breaks them down and recombines them into more complex compounds. Tholins accumulate on Huya's surface over time, forming a thick layer that conceals fresh material like water ice underneath.

The surface composition of Huya can be studied via spectroscopy, particularly in near-infrared wavelengths where absorption signatures of various compounds like water ice and hydrocarbons can be found. Early attempts at studying Huya's near-infrared spectrum by ground-based telescopes were unable to detect any clear absorption features. High-resolution near-infrared spectroscopy by the James Webb Space Telescope (JWST) in 2023 has revealed that Huya's surface contains various carbon-containing ices, including carbon monoxide (CO), carbon dioxide (CO_{2}) and its heavier isotopologue ^{13}CO_{2}, methanol (CH_{3}OH), and other complex organic and aliphatic compounds. No clear signs of water ice were detected in Huya's near-infrared spectrum by JWST; while there is an absorption feature at 2.0 μm where water ice is expected (and was tentatively reported by ground-based spectroscopy), it is more likely attributed to complex organics due to the absorption feature's different shape.

Huya's near-infrared spectrum is characterized by a prominent "double-dip" absorption feature at 3.0–3.7 μm, which indicates spectrally prominent carbon oxides. TNOs exhibiting this "double-dip" spectral feature, known as CO_{2}-type TNOs, are generally found on dynamically excited (high inclination and eccentricity) orbits, and are believed to have formed near the CO_{2} ice line in the middle of the primordial Kuiper belt prior to Neptune's outward migration. Huya has been identified as an outlier among the CO_{2}-type TNOs due to its comparatively weaker CO_{2} absorption features.

Visible spectroscopy of Huya by the Very Large Telescope in 2001 and 2002 has shown multiple weak absorption features at 0.5–0.9 μm, which has been interpreted as signs of aqueously-altered (hydrated) phyllosilicate minerals on Huya's surface. This finding is unexpected as TNOs are too cold for mineral hydration to occur. Nevertheless, it is possible that enough heat for mineral hydration could have been supplied in the past, through impact events or radioactive decay. However, later observations of Huya's visible spectrum in 2013 did not find any absorption features related to aqueously-altered silicate minerals, suggesting that they are either not real or are concentrated in a small, localized area of Huya's surface. The surface temperature of Huya at perihelion is estimated to be approximately 51.7 Kelvin.

== Rotation ==
The rotation period of Huya is difficult to measure photometrically with telescopes on Earth because it fluctuates very little in brightness as it rotates, due to its spheroidal shape. Several astronomers have attempted measuring Huya's rotation period via time series photometry, but were either unsuccessful due to insufficient precision or were able to tentatively identify rotation periods of a few hours. As of 2025, astronomers believe Huya has a likely rotation period of 6.725 hours, based on photometry of observations from 2010–2013 and 2019. The light curve of Huya derived from these observations appears sinusoidal with a low amplitude of 0.031 magnitudes. The 6.725-hour rotation period of Huya is derived from this light curve by assuming it has a single-peaked periodicity due to a spheroidal shape. The axial tilt of Huya's rotation has not been measured, but it can be assumed to be aligned with the orbit of its moon.

== Satellite ==
Huya and its moon (indicated with arrow) imaged by the Hubble Space Telescope in 2002

Huya has one known moon, which has no official name or designation. Huya and its moon form a binary system, and are together referred to as the Huya system. It was discovered by a team led by Keith Noll using Hubble Space Telescope images taken on 6 May 2012, and confirmed in reexamination of archival Hubble imagery from 2002. The moon's discovery was announced by International Astronomical Union on 12 July 2012.

The moon tightly orbits Huya with a separation distance of 1,900 km (1,200 mi) and an orbital period of 3.46 days. It has a diameter between 165–243 km (103–151 mi), or roughly half of Huya's diameter. With its large size relative to Huya, the moon is expected to have tidally locked Huya's rotation, but observations of Huya's short rotation period show this is not the case. This suggests that the moon has a low density, likely around 0.5 g/cm^{3}. A similar scenario has been observed in the binary Kuiper belt object 174567 Varda, whose rotation is not tidally locked to its large moon Ilmarë.

From the perspective of Earth, the opening angle of the Huya system's mutual orbit is slowly decreasing as the Huya system moves along its orbit around the Sun. The Huya system will shift from a pole-on to an edge-on perspective by the year 2033, when the Huya system will enter mutual events season. During mutual events season, Huya and its moon will take turns eclipsing and transiting each other, producing dips in brightness that last up to ~5 hours and have depths of up to ~0.25 magnitudes. Observations of these mutual events can help refine the Huya system's properties and can reveal the shapes, relative sizes, and surface albedo variations of Huya and its moon.

== Exploration ==
In a study published by Ashley Gleaves and colleagues in 2012, Huya was considered as a potential target for an orbiter mission that would be launched on an Atlas V 551 or Delta IV HLV rocket. For an orbiter mission to Huya, the spacecraft would have a launch date in November 2027 and use a gravity assist from Jupiter, taking 20 to 25 years to arrive. Gleaves concluded that Huya and Ixion were the most feasible targets for the orbiter, as the trajectories required the fewest maneuvers for orbital insertion around either. For a flyby mission to Huya, planetary scientist Amanda Zangari calculated that a spacecraft could take just under 10 years to arrive at Huya using a Jupiter gravity assist, based on a launch date of 2027 or 2032. Huya would be approximately 31 to 37 AU from the Sun when the spacecraft arrives by 2040. Alternative trajectories using gravity assists from Jupiter, Saturn, or Uranus have been also considered. A trajectory using gravity assists from Jupiter and Uranus could take at least 20 years, based a launch date of 2038 or 2039, whereas a trajectory using a gravity assist from Saturn could take over 16 years, based on a later launch date of 2040. Using these alternative trajectories for the spacecraft, Huya would be approximately 37 to 38 AU from the Sun when the spacecraft arrives before 2060.

== See also ==
- (84522) 2002 TC302, a mid-sized resonant trans-Neptunian object suspected to have a large and closely-orbiting moon similar to Huya's
