= Hubble Heritage Project =

The Hubble Heritage Project was founded in 1998 by Keith Noll, Howard Bond, Forrest Hamilton, Anne Kinney, and Zoltan Levay at the Space Telescope Science Institute. Initial team members included Carol Christian, Jayanne English, and Lisa Frattare. Until its end in 2016, the Hubble Heritage Project released, on an almost monthly basis, pictures of celestial objects like planets, stars, galaxies and galaxy clusters.

== Description ==
The team of astronomers and image processing specialists selected images from the Hubble Space Telescope's public data archive and planned new observations with the goal of producing aesthetically impactful, full color images that preserved the scientific integrity of the data.

The Project was recognized for its contribution to public inspiration. Achievements for the team include the Astronomical Society of the Pacific 2003 Klumpke-Roberts Award for "outstanding contributions to the public understanding and appreciation of astronomy." In 2002, two Heritage images were selected in the Rochester Institute of Technology's "Images From Science" traveling gallery exhibit. Several images have been selected by the US and UK postal systems. In 2000, a first-class US postage stamp showing the Ring Nebula was one of five Hubble images selected to be part of a commemorative series of stamps honoring astronomer Edwin P. Hubble.

The website of the project contained information about the NASA/ESA Hubble Space Telescope and the images are now preserved on the Hubble Space Telescope's outreach website, Hubblesite (see link below).

== See also ==
- List of astronomical societies
