= Keith S. Noll =

American planetary scientist

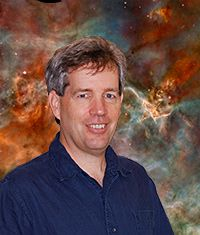
- Born: 1958
- Education: Stony Brook University; University of Illinois system
- Awards: American Astronomical Society Education Prize (2007)
- Scientific career
- Workplaces: Space Telescope Science Institute; Goddard Space Flight Center

Keith S. Noll (born 1958) is an American planetary scientist.

== Biography ==
Noll works at NASA's Goddard Space Flight Center (GSFC) as a planetary astronomer. Before coming go GSFC, he worked at the Space Telescope Science Institute for 20 years, where he founded the Hubble Heritage Project in 1998. He became chief of GSFC's Planetary Systems Laboratory in 2011, a position he held for six years. Since 2015, he is the Lucy mission’s project scientist.

His research interests include the study of small bodies in the Solar System, the atmospheres of giant planets, brown dwarfs, Saturn's moon Titan, and icy satellites. He has focused on the study of trans-Neptunian objects, particularly with the Hubble Space Telescope. By about 2020, he was responsible for discovering more than 75% of all then-known binary asteroids in the Kuiper belt. (Note: The source for this was published between 2019 and 2021. This may no longer be true as of 2025; compare more recently published studies like Porter et al. 2024.) Noll is interested in identifying opportunities for studying material from the early Solar System that is accessible to Earth-based missions like Lucy.

In 1993, Noll became a member of the International Astronomical Union (IAU). Since 2007, he is a member of the Working Group Small Body Nomenclature, the section of the IAU that is responsible for naming minor planets. He became its vice-chair in 2023.

In 2006, 6386 Keithnoll, a Mars-crossing asteroid, was named in his honor.

== Notable discoveries ==
Noll is credited with co-discovering the binary nature of the trans-Neptunian object 58534 Logos and of 16974 Iphthime, the third known binary Jupiter trojan. He also co-discovered the minor-planet moons Hiisi, Ilmarë, Thorondor, Echidna, Actaea and G!o'e !Hu, as well as the moon of 38628 Huya.
