= Eric P. Rubenstein =

American astronomer

Eric P. Rubenstein (born 1964) is an American astronomer.

The Minor Planet Center credits him with the discovery of the asteroid 47171 Lempo, performed on October 1, 1999, in collaboration with Louis-Gregory Strolger.

After his doctorate at Yale University, he worked as a researcher at the Cerro Tololo Observatory and at Smith College. In 2002 he interrupted his academic career to start his own business.
