= Moon of 38628 Huya =

- Huya and its moon (indicated with arrow) imaged by the Hubble Space Telescope in 2002

Discovery
- Discovered by: Keith S. Noll; William M. Grundy; Hilke Schlichting; Ruth Murray-Clay; Susan D. Benecchi
- Discovery date: 6 May 2012

Orbital characteristics
- Epoch 2 May 2002 12:00 UTC (JD 2452400.0)
- Semi-major axis: 1898+22 −21 km
- Eccentricity: 0.036+0.017 −0.015
- Orbital period (sidereal): 3.46293±0.00001 d
- Mean anomaly: 147°+23° −17°
- Inclination: 65.8°±1.9° (to ecliptic)
- Longitude of ascending node: 122.9°+1.7° −1.6°
- Argument of periapsis: 101°+17° −24°
- Satellite of: 38628 Huya

Physical characteristics
- Mean diameter: 217+25 −22 km (thermal); 165–243 km (occultation)
- Albedo: 0.079±0.004
- Apparent magnitude: 21.6
- Absolute magnitude (H): 6.68±0.18

The Kuiper belt object 38628 Huya has a single known natural satellite or moon, which as of 2025 has no official designation or name. Huya and its moon form a binary system, and are together referred to as the Huya system. The moon was discovered by a team led by Keith Noll using Hubble Space Telescope images taken on 6 May 2012, and confirmed in reexamination of archival Hubble imagery from 30 June and 1 July 2002. The discovery was reported to the International Astronomical Union and was announced on 12 July 2012.

== Orbit ==
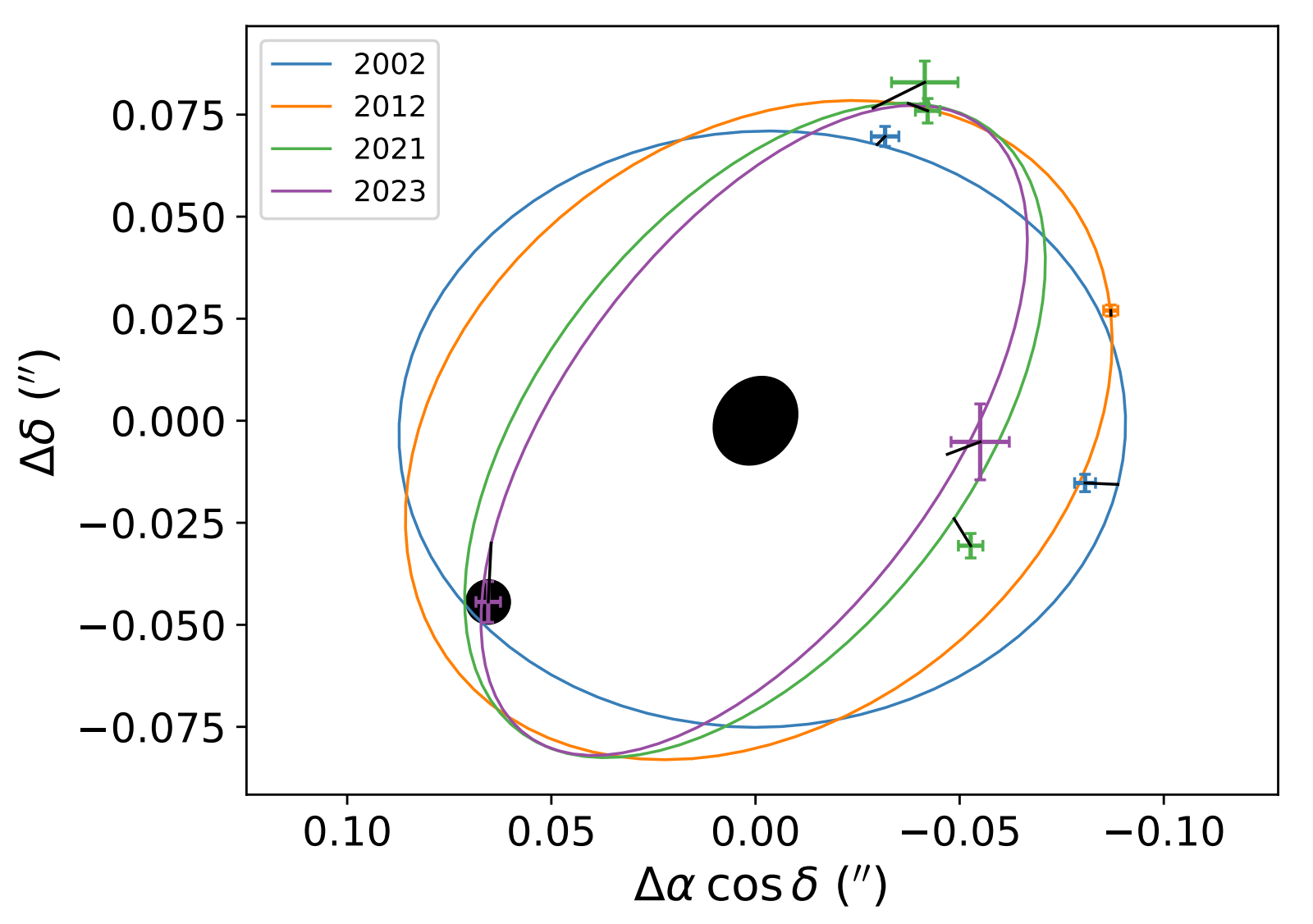
The changing perspective of the orbit of Huya's moon from 2002 to 2023. Crosses indicate measured positions of the moon in imaging and occultation observations.

Measurements of the moon's position in direct imaging and stellar occultations indicate that the moon orbits Huya with a separation distance of 1,900 km (1,200 mi) and an orbital period of 3.46 days. Compared to other known binary trans-Neptunian objects, the mutual orbit of the Huya system is relatively tight. The moon's orbit is nearly circular, with a low orbital eccentricity of 0.036. The moon's orbital inclination with respect to Huya's equator is unknown (due to the unknown axial tilt of Huya), but it is presumably very small (coplanar to Huya's equator). The orbital inclination of Huya's moon is 66 degrees with respect to the ecliptic, or the plane of the Solar System.

The moon's orbital elements mentioned above are derived by assuming a Keplerian orbit, which ignores perturbation effects such as precession for simplicity. However, the moon's Keplerian orbit somewhat deviates from its measured positions in images and occultations; this is most likely explained by precession of the moon's orbit due to Huya's oblate shape, which has been observed in occultations. The orbital precession period of Huya's moon is likely less than 5 years.

From the perspective of Earth, the opening angle of the Huya system's mutual orbit is slowly decreasing as the Huya system moves along its orbit around the Sun. The Huya system will shift from a pole-on to an edge-on perspective by the year 2033, when the Huya system will enter mutual events season. During mutual events season, Huya and its moon will take turns eclipsing and transiting each other, producing dips in brightness that last up to ~5 hours and have depths of up to ~0.25 magnitudes. Observations of these mutual events can help refine the Huya system's properties and can reveal the shapes, relative sizes, and surface albedo variations of Huya and its moon.

== Observations ==
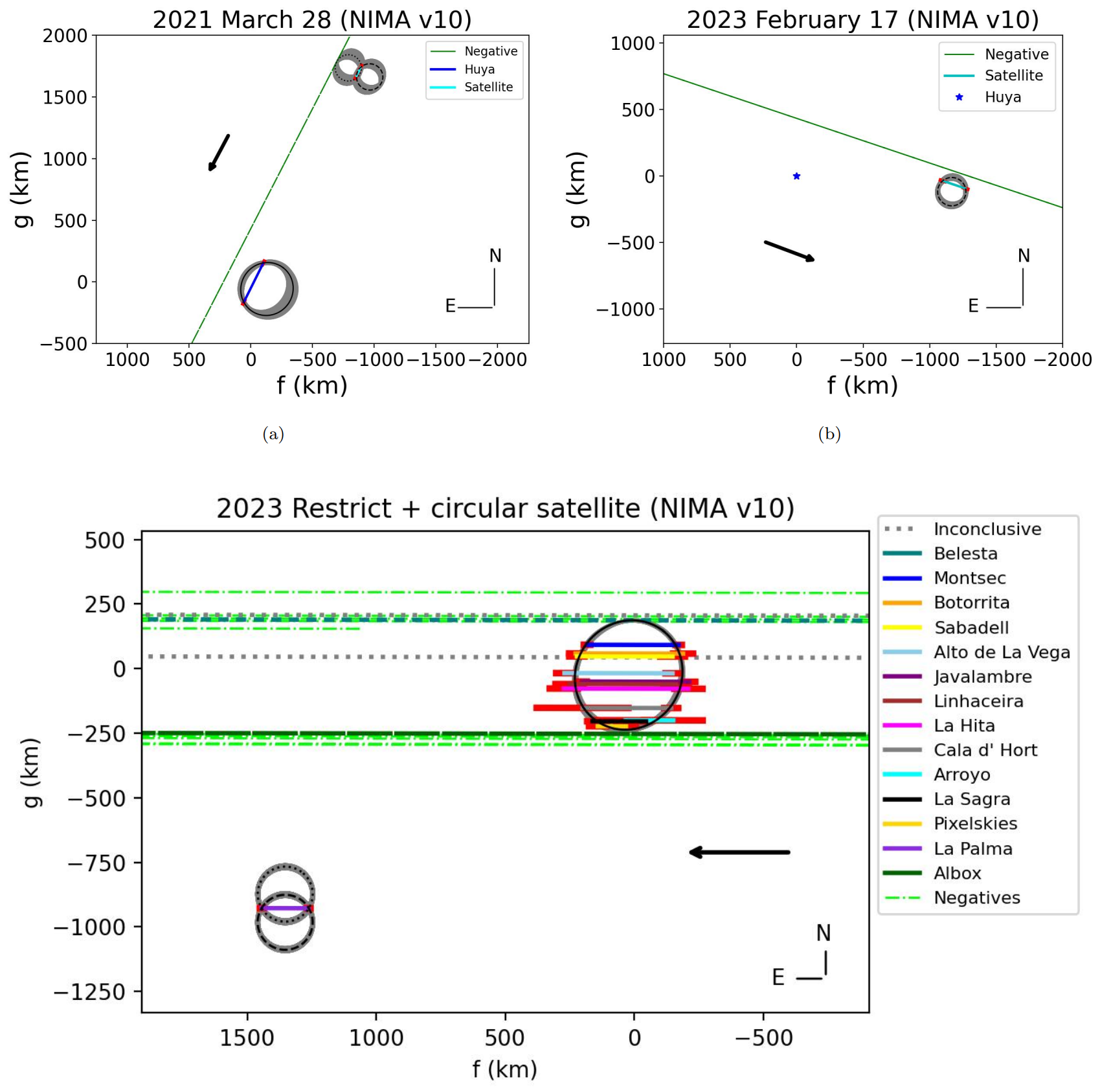
Stellar occultations by Huya's moon in March 2021, February 2023, and June 2023. Huya (the larger body) was also detected in the March 2021 and June 2023 occultations.

The moon is about 1.4 magnitudes dimmer than Huya in visible light. Because the moon orbits close to Huya, it only appears at small angular separations of up to 0.1 arcseconds from Huya. This is close to the angular resolution limit of state-of-the-art telescopes such as Hubble and the Keck telescopes with adaptive optics. Because of this, it is challenging to resolve the moon from Huya in direct imaging; the moon has only been imaged in 2002 and 2012 by Hubble and in 2021 by Keck. With the sparse number of imaging observations, the orbit of Huya's moon remained poorly known until it was later detected via stellar occultations in 2021 and 2023.

As of 2025, the moon of Huya has been detected via stellar occultation three times, all by chance as the moon's orbit was not known at these times. Stellar occultations allow for highly accurate measurements of an object's position, which in turn enables the determination of its orbit. The first occultation detection of Huya's moon occurred on 28 March 2021. The 2021 occultation by the moon was detected by Ondřejov Observatory in Czech Republic, which reported an eight-second-long dip (corresponding to a chord length of 73 ± 40 km (45 ± 25 mi)) occurring about 3 minutes before the primary occultation by Huya. The second occultation by Huya's moon was observed on 17 February 2023 by Penrose Observatory in Colorado, United States, which reported a nine-second-long dip corresponding to a chord length of 177 ± 35 km (110 ± 22 mi). The third occultation by Huya's moon was observed on 24 June 2023 by La Palma Observatory in Canary Islands, Spain, which reported an eight-second-long dip corresponding to a chord length of 179 ± 14 km (111.2 ± 8.7 mi). In all cases, the occultation by the moon was detected at only one location, which prevented the determination of the moon's shape.

== Physical characteristics ==
Direct observations of the moon via stellar occultation place a minimum diameter of 165 km (103 mi), while modeling of the Huya system's thermal emission places a maximum diameter of 243 km (151 mi). If the moon has the same albedo as Huya (0.079), the moon would be 213 km (132 mi) in diameter. In either case, the moon is relatively large compared to Huya, being about half of Huya's diameter. The Huya system's satellite-to-primary diameter ratio is intermediate among those of other binary trans-Neptunian objects, which are often found having either equally-sized components or large primary components with small moon.

With its large size relative to Huya, the moon is expected to have slowed Huya's rotation down via tidal forces, to the point that both components would be tidally locked to each other. However, observations of Huya's rotational light curve suggest otherwise, instead finding a short rotation period of several hours. The present-day non-synchronous rotation of Huya can be explained if the moon has a low density of around 0.5 g/cm^{3}, which would make it not massive enough to tidally lock Huya's rotation. A similar scenario has been observed in the binary Kuiper belt object 174567 Varda, whose rotation is not tidally locked to its large moon Ilmarë, though in this case it has been suggested that the Varda system is not old enough for tidal locking.
