= 58534 Logos =

Binary Kuiper belt object

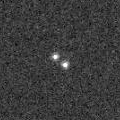
- Logos and its companion Zoe imaged by the Hubble Space Telescope in 2004

Discovery
- Discovered by: Maunakea Obs.
- Discovery site: Maunakea Obs.
- Discovery date: 4 February 1997

Designations
- Pronunciation: /ˈloʊɡɒs/ or /ˈlɒɡɒs/
- Named after: Logos (Aeon in Ptolemy Gnostics)
- Alternative designations: 1997 CQ_{29}
- Minor planet category: TNO · cubewano cold
- Adjectives: Logian /ˈlɒdʒiən/

Orbital characteristics
- Epoch 13 January 2016 (JD 2457400.5)
- Uncertainty parameter 3
- Observation arc: 5582 days (15.28 yr)
- Aphelion: 51.153 AU (7.6524 Tm)
- Perihelion: 39.945 AU (5.9757 Tm)
- Semi-major axis: 45.549 AU (6.8140 Tm)
- Eccentricity: 0.12304
- Orbital period (sidereal): 307.42 yr (112284 d)
- Mean anomaly: 56.495°
- Mean motion: 0° 0^{m} 11.542^{s} / day
- Inclination: 2.8946°
- Longitude of ascending node: 132.491°
- Argument of perihelion: 339.21°
- Known satellites: Zoe (est. D: 66 km)

Physical characteristics
- Mean diameter: 77±18 km
- Mass: 2.7×10^{17} kg
- Mean density: 1.0 g/cm^{3}
- Synodic rotation period: 17.43±0.06 hr (orbital period of inner binary)
- Geometric albedo: 0.39 ± 0.17
- Absolute magnitude (H): 6.6

58534 Logos, or as a binary system (58534) Logos–Zoe (provisional designation 1997 CQ_{29}), is a likely trans-Neptunian contact binary or close-binary triple system in the cold classical population of the Kuiper belt. The contact binary is approximately 77 kilometers (48 miles) in diameter. and has a 66-kilometer (41 miles) companion named Zoe. The system mass is (4.58±0.07)×10^{17} kg.

In the Gnostic tradition, Logos and Zoe are a paired emanation of the deity, and part of its creation myth.

Hubble Space Telescope observations of variations in brightness that indicate that Logos itself is likely a close binary or contact binary. It rotates with a period of 17.4 hours.

== Orbit ==
A 10-million-year integration of the orbit shows that it is a classical Kuiper belt object that does not get closer to the Sun than 38.8 AU (5.80 billion km) or further than 52.1 AU.

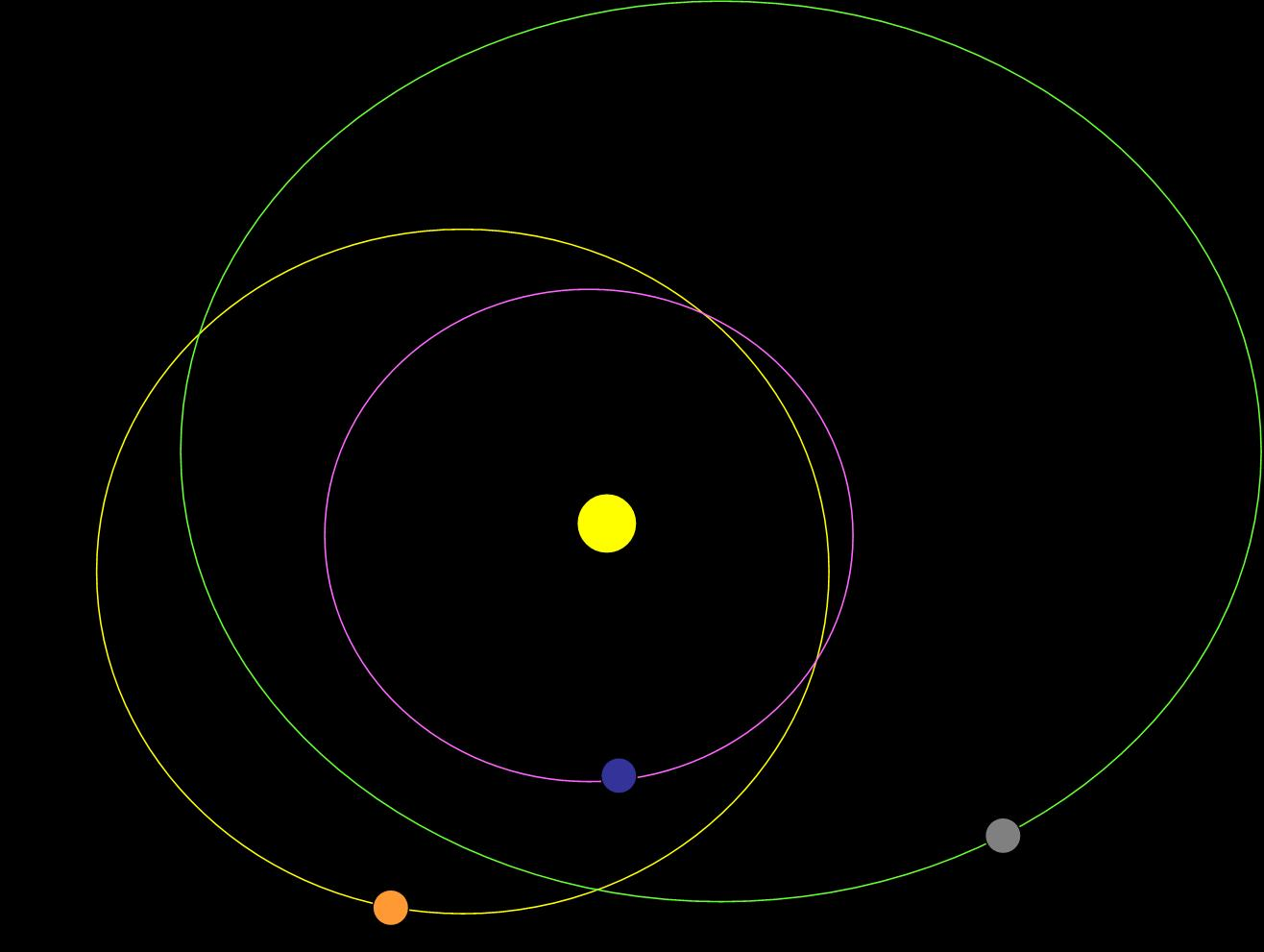
Orbit of Logos (grey object) compared with Pluto (orange) and Neptune (blue)

== Zoe ==
Zoe
- Two bodies with similar mass orbiting around a common barycenter (red cross) with elliptic orbits. The interaction of Logos and Zoe is similar to this.

Discovery
- Discovered by: Keith S. Noll et al.
- Discovery date: 17 November 2001

Designations
- Pronunciation: /ˈzoʊ.iː/
- Named after: Zoe (Ζωή)
- Alternative designations: (58534) Logos I
- Adjectives: Zoean /zoʊˈiːən/)

Orbital characteristics
- Semi-major axis: 8217±42 km
- Eccentricity: 0.5463±0.0079
- Orbital period (sidereal): 309.87±0.22 d
- Satellite of: Logos

Physical characteristics
- Dimensions: 66 km
- Mass: (1.5±0.2)×10^{17} kg

Logos is a binary with the components of comparable size orbiting the barycentre on a moderately elliptical orbit.

The Logos system was discovered on 4 February 1997, and it was discovered to be a binary object on 17 November 2001 from Hubble Space Telescope observations by K. S. Noll, D. C. Stephens, W. M. Grundy, J. Spencer, Robert Millis, Marc Buie, Dale Cruikshank, S. C. Tegler, and W. Romanishin and announced on 11 February 2002.

Once the secondary was confirmed, it was officially designated (58534) Logos I and named Zoe. It orbits its primary Logos with a semi-major axis of 8217 km in 309.9 days with an eccentricity of 0.546. Its estimated diameter is 66 km, and mass is (0.15 ± 0.02)×10^{18} kg.

Zoe potentially has a very slow rotation. As of 2026, its shape is unknown.

== See also ==
- 47171 Lempo – the first and only confirmed hierarchical triple system in the Kuiper belt
- 148780 Altjira – another potential triple system in the cold classical Kuiper belt
- 385446 Manwë – A wide binary resonant Kuiper belt object composed of a contact binary and a slowly rotating companion
