= 148780 Altjira =

Binary Kuiper belt object

(148780) Altjira
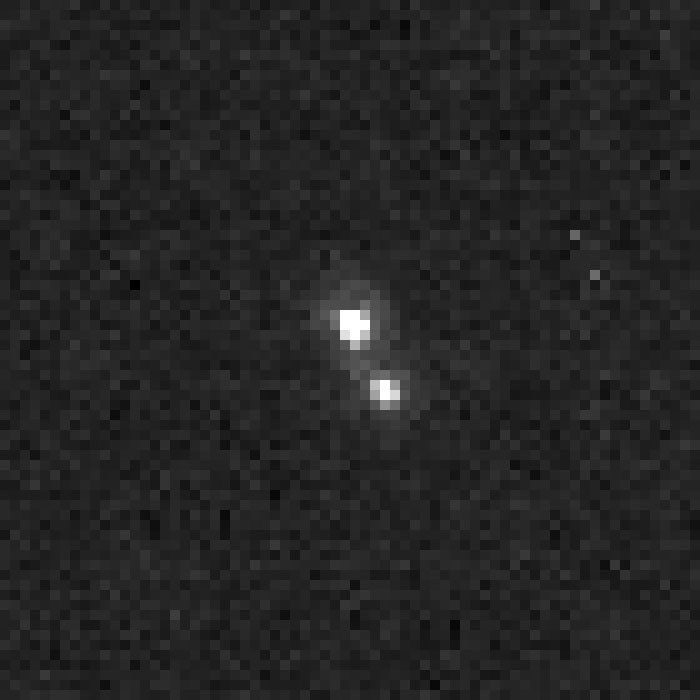
- Altjira and its companion imaged by the Hubble Space Telescope in 2006

Discovery
- Discovery site: Deep Ecliptic Survey at Kitt Peak
- Discovery date: 20 October 2001

Designations
- Pronunciation: /ælˈtʃɪərə/
- Named after: Altjira
- Alternative designations: 2001 UQ_{18}
- Minor planet category: Classical KBO (DES)

Orbital characteristics
- Epoch 2025 May 05 (JD 2460800.5)
- Uncertainty parameter 4
- Observation arc: 7,709 days (21.11 yr)
- Aphelion: 47.11 AU (7.048 Tm)
- Perihelion: 42.00 AU (6.283 Tm)
- Semi-major axis: 44.55 AU (6.665 Tm)
- Eccentricity: 0.0573
- Orbital period (sidereal): 297.40 yr (108626±31 d)
- Mean anomaly: 129°
- Mean motion: 0.003314°/day
- Inclination: 5.198°
- Longitude of ascending node: 1.84°
- Time of perihelion: 1919 Feb 16 ±37 days
- Argument of perihelion: 304°
- Known satellites: 1 confirmed, 1 suspected

Physical characteristics
- Mean diameter: 331+51 −187 km (combined); 246+38 −139 km (primary)
- Mass: (3.952±0.067)×10^{18} kg (system) 2.338×10^{18} kg (primary) (Note: Assuming a spherical diameter of 246 km and a density of 0.3 g/cm^{3})
- Mean density: 0.30+0.50 −0.14 g/cm^{3}
- Geometric albedo: 0.0430+0.1825 −0.0095
- Spectral type: B−V = 0.91±0.13; V−R = 0.74±0.08; V−I = 1.17±0.09
- Absolute magnitude (H): 5.77; 5.4 (system), 5.1 (primary)

148780 Altjira (provisional designation 2001 UQ_{18}) appears to be a triple or contact binary double classical Kuiper belt object. The secondary is large compared to the primary, approximately 246 kilometres (153 mi) of the primary vs. 221 kilometres (137 mi) to the secondary. The lightcurve is quite flat (Δmag < 0.10), which is indicative of a "quasi-spherical body with a homogeneous surface". The system mass is 4×10^{18} kg.

In 2008, Altjira was named after the Arrernte creation deity, Altjira (Alchera).

== Physical characteristics ==
Altjira is a binary system consisting of two bodies of nearly equal size, making it a true synchronous binary rather than a typical primary-satellite system.

=== Size and dimensions ===
Observations using thermal modeling indicate that the Altjira system has a combined effective diameter of approximately 331+51
−187 km. The primary body has an estimated diameter of 246 (+38/−139) km, while the secondary body (the companion) possesses a radius of roughly 111 km (a diameter of ~222 km).

=== Density and porosity ===
The bulk density of Altjira is exceptionally low, estimated at roughly 0.3+0.50
−0.14 g/cm^{3} (300 kg/m^{3}). This makes Altjira one of the least dense known large Kuiper belt objects (KBOs). Such an incredibly low density implies that the interiors of both bodies are highly porous, resembling loose "rubble piles" rather than solid ice or rock.

=== Albedo and color ===
Altjira has a relatively high geometric albedo, measured at 0.14±0.05. It exhibits a very red surface color in the visible spectrum, which is a typical trait among cold classical Kuiper belt objects.

== Satellite ==
Satellite of Altjira
Discovery
- Discovery date: 6 August 2006

Orbital characteristics
- Semi-major axis: 9904±56 km
- Eccentricity: 0.3445±0.0045
- Orbital period (sidereal): 139.561±0.047 d
- Inclination: 35.19°±0.19° (retrograde)
- Satellite of: 148780 Altjira

Physical characteristics
- Mean diameter: 221+34 −125 km
- Mass: 1.695×10^{18} kg (Note: Assuming a spherical diameter of 221 km and a density identical to the primary)
- Absolute magnitude (H): difference from primary: 0.7±0.2

Altjira's companion was discovered on 6 August 2006, from images taken by the Hubble Space Telescope. The companion has no official designation. (Note: Nelsen et al. (2025) claim that Altjira's companion is designated "S/2007 (148780) 1", even though it was discovered in 2006. The JPL Small Body Database and Johnston's Archive do not recognize any official designation for the companion.) The secondary's orbit has the following parameters: semi-major-axis, 9904±56 km; period, 139.561±0.047 d; eccentricity, 0.3445±0.0045; and inclination, 35.19°±0.19° (retrograde). There is indirect evidence that Altjira may be an unresolved hierarchical triple system.

== See also ==
- 47171 Lempo – the first and only confirmed hierarchical triple system in the Kuiper belt
- 58534 Logos – a contact binary and potential triple system in the cold classical Kuiper belt
