= Huya (mythology) =

Rain god of the Wayuu people

Huya (Wayuu: Juyá, pronounced [huˈja]) is the name of the rain god of the Wayuu people of Venezuela and Colombia.

The minor planet 38628 Huya is named after this figure.
