= (523764) 2014 WC510 =

Binary trans-Neptunian object

(523764) 2014 WC_{510}
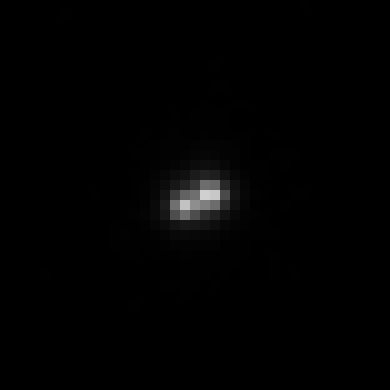
- 2014 WC_{510} imaged by the Hubble Space Telescope in March 2024

Discovery
- Discovered by: Pan-STARRS 1
- Discovery site: Haleakalā Obs.
- Discovery date: 8 September 2011 (first imaged)

Designations
- Minor planet category: plutino · TNO distant · binary

Orbital characteristics
- Epoch 31 May 2020 (JD 2459000.5)
- Uncertainty parameter 2
- Observation arc: 7.49 yr (2,737 days)
- Aphelion: 48.936 AU
- Perihelion: 29.535
- Semi-major axis: 39.236
- Eccentricity: 0.24724
- Orbital period (sidereal): 245.77 yr
- Mean anomaly: 342.994°
- Mean motion: 0° 0^{m} 14.437^{s} / day
- Inclination: 19.542°
- Longitude of ascending node: 194.464°
- Argument of perihelion: 289.173°
- Known satellites: 1

Physical characteristics
- Mean diameter: 181±16 km (primary); 138±32 km (secondary)
- Geometric albedo: 0.051±0.017
- Apparent magnitude: 22.0
- Absolute magnitude (H): 7.2±0.3

(523764) 2014 WC_{510} is a binary trans-Neptunian object and plutino discovered on 8 September 2011 by the Pan-STARRS survey at the Haleakalā Observatory in Hawaii. It orbits in the Kuiper belt, a region of icy objects orbiting beyond Neptune in the outer Solar System. Astronomers discovered the binary nature of 2014 WC_{510} when its two components occulted a star on 1 December 2018. The components of the 2014 WC_{510} binary system, which have diameters of 180 km (110 mi) and 140 km (87 mi), orbit each other at a separation distance of roughly 2,600 km (1,600 mi).

== Observations ==
=== Discovery ===
The Pan-STARRS survey is conducted by one of the two 1.8-meter Ritchey–Chrétien telescopes (named Pan-STARRS 1 and 2) at the Haleakalā Observatory atop the Hawaiian island of Maui. 2014 WC_{510} was first observed by Pan-STARRS 1 on 8 September 2011, but was not recognized as a new object until 20 November 2014. After Pan-STARRS 1 made further observations of the object, the Minor Planet Center announced 2014 WC_{510} as a newly-discovered minor planet on 17 July 2016. The minor planet provisional designation given to the object, 2014 WC_{510}, does not necessarily reflect its discovery date but is rather derived from the date of observation on which the object was first recognized. The observers operating the Pan-STARRS 1 telescope in these observations were B. Gibson, T. Goggia, N. Primak, A. Schultz, and M. Willman. After 2014 WC_{510} was observed long enough to secure its orbit, the Minor Planet Center gave it the permanent minor planet number 523764 on 25 September 2018 and declared the object's official discovery date as 8 September 2011, in accordance with the Minor Planet Center's discovery rules.

=== Occultation ===
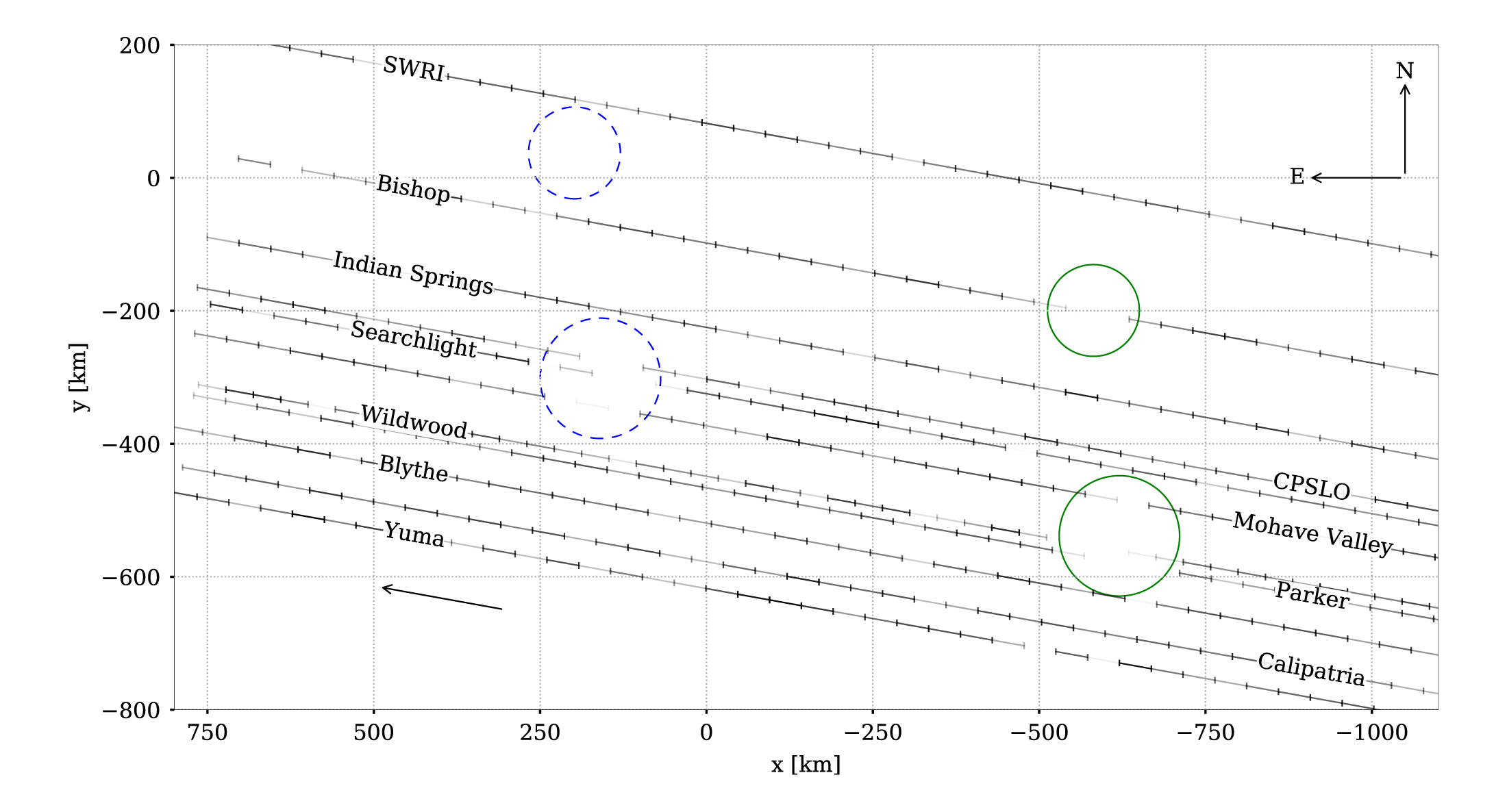
Plot of chords obtained from the 1 December 2018 occultation. Because the occulted star is a double star, the components of 2014 WC_{510} were detected twice (each detection represented by green and blue).

On 1 December 2018, 2014 WC_{510} occulted a 15th-magnitude double star, blocking out its starlight for a maximum duration of approximately 11 seconds. The stellar occultation was observed by astronomers and citizen scientists across the West Coast of the United States and Canada. Of the 41 participating sites, six of them reported dimming in the star's brightness, signifying likely positive detections of the occultation. Five of these sites reported two consecutive dimmings due to the occulted star's double nature; 2014 WC_{510} occulted one of the two stars being observed. These observations were part of a campaign coordinated by the Research and Education Collaborative Occultation Network (RECON), a citizen science project dedicated to observing occultations by trans-Neptunian objects.

Prior to the occultation, 2014 WC_{510} had only been observed by Pan-STARRS over an observation arc of 3 years. The calculated orbit from these Pan-STARRS observations had significant uncertainty, which would have been unreliable for predicting occultations. In an effort to reduce the orbital uncertainty, the RECON project collaborated with the Pan-STARRS project to do a precovery search of archival Pan-STARRS images to gather extensive astrometric positions of 2014 WC_{510}. Follow-up observations by Pan-STARRS were also conducted through 2016–2018 and helped extend 2014 WC_{510}'s observation arc to 6.3 years. Although an observation arc of this length is generally unreliable for predicting occultations especially by distant objects, this was compensated by Pan-STARRS's highly accurate astrometry, allowing for 2014 WC_{510}'s orbital uncertainty to be significantly reduced.

== Orbit and classification ==
2014 WC_{510} is classified as a plutino, a subgroup of the resonant trans-Neptunian objects located in the inner region of Kuiper belt. Named after the group's largest member, Pluto, the plutinos are in a 2:3 mean-motion orbital resonance with Neptune. That is, they complete two orbits around the Sun for every three orbits that Neptune takes. 2014 WC_{510} orbits the Sun at an average distance of 39.24 astronomical units (5.87×10^{9} km; 3.65×10^{9} mi), taking 245.8 years to complete a full orbit. This is characteristic of all plutinos, which have orbital periods around 250 years and semi-major axes around 39 AU.

Like Pluto, 2014 WC_{510}'s orbit is elongated and inclined to the ecliptic. 2014 WC_{510} has an orbital eccentricity of 0.25 and an orbital inclination of 19.5 degrees with respect to the ecliptic. Over the course of its orbit, 2014 WC_{510}'s distance from the Sun varies from 29.5 AU at perihelion (closest distance) to 48.9 AU at aphelion (farthest distance). 2014 WC_{510} has last passed aphelion in the early 20th century, and is now moving closer to the Sun, approaching perihelion by 2032. Simulations by the Deep Ecliptic Survey show that 2014 WC_{510} can acquire a perihelion distance (q_{min}) as small as 28.7 AU over the next 10 million years.

== Binary system ==
Observations of the December 2018 occultation revealed that 2014 WC_{510} is a binary system consisting of two components at a relatively close separation from each other. Of the six sites that reported positive detections of the occultation, one site located in Bishop, California, detected a shorter dimming event separate from the main detections by the other five sites located south of it. A 2020 study led by Rodrigo Leiva, Marc Buie, and collaborators analyzed the occultation data and determined that the detection from Bishop was most likely an occultation by a secondary component of 2014 WC_{510}.

Since the two components were only observed for a short period of time during the occultation, the binary system's orbital parameters have not been determined. The projected separation distance between the primary and secondary during the occultation was 349 ± 29 km (217 ± 18 mi), derived from an angular separation of 16±1 milliarcseconds (mas). This small projected separation distance initially led researchers to believe that 2014 WC_{510} is a compact binary system, but high-resolution imaging by the Hubble Space Telescope on 6 March 2024 revealed that 2014 WC_{510}'s components are more widely separated from each other by at least 2,600 km (1,600 mi) (angular separation 120 mas). (Note: The projected separation d = 2600 km is calculated from the tangent of the components' angular separation of θ = 3.33×10^{−5} degrees (120 mas): $\tan \theta = \frac \mathrm{d}\mathrm{r}$, where the r is the radial distance between Earth and 2014 WC_{510} in km.) The large change in projected separation distance between the occultation and Hubble observations suggests that the 2014 WC_{510} system was in or near an edge-on configuration, in which the components of the 2014 WC_{510} system may have transited or occulted each other from Earth.

Most models of the formation of the Solar System indicate that most TNOs have formed as binaries, hence they are expected to be common especially in the Kuiper belt population. While most known binary TNOs appear to have wide mutual orbits, tight binary TNOs are thought to have a higher chance of survival after their formation. 2014 WC_{510} belongs to the population of smaller TNOs, which are expected to have a primordial origin similar to the classical Kuiper belt object 486958 Arrokoth.

== Physical characteristics ==
Assuming a circular projected shape for the components' occultation profiles, the diameters of the primary and secondary are estimated to be 181 ± 16 km (112.5 ± 9.9 mi) and 138 ± 32 km (86 ± 20 mi), respectively. The diameter ratio of the secondary to the primary is 0.76:1.00—the secondary component is approximately 75% as large as the primary. Hubble observations from 2024 show that the secondary component is about 25–30% fainter than the primary. The orbital distance and period of the components is unknown, so the mass and density of the 2014 WC_{510} system cannot be derived. The individual components of the 2014 WC_{510} system are among the smallest trans-Neptunian objects with sizes measured with stellar occultations, following Arrokoth (~30 km).

Given the components' estimated diameters and their combined absolute magnitude of 7.2, their calculated geometric albedos indicate that they have dark surfaces, reflecting about 5% of incident visible light. However, the estimated geometric albedo may be subject to a systematic error depending on the true shapes and photometric properties of the components, resulting in a significant uncertainty of ±2%. Nonetheless, 2014 WC_{510} is one of the darkest objects measured with stellar occultations, being darker than Arrokoth.
