= 385446 Manwë =

Binary Kuiper belt object

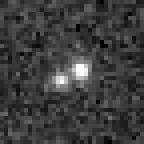
- Hubble Space Telescope image of Manwë and Thorondor, taken in 2013

Discovery
- Discovered by: M. W. Buie
- Discovery site: Cerro Tololo Obs.
- Discovery date: 25 August 2003

Designations
- Pronunciation: [ˈmanwɛ]
- Named after: Manwë (fictional character)
- Alternative designations: 2003 QW_{111}
- Minor planet category: TNO; 4:7 resonance

Orbital characteristics (barycentric)
- Epoch 25 February 2023 (JD 2460000.5)
- Uncertainty parameter 4
- Observation arc: 18.05 yr (6,593 days)
- Aphelion: 48.667 AU
- Perihelion: 38.758 AU
- Semi-major axis: 43.713 AU
- Eccentricity: 0.11334
- Orbital period (sidereal): 288.82 yr (105,492 d)
- Mean anomaly: 285.002°
- Mean motion: 0° 0^{m} 12.285^{s} / day
- Inclination: 2.667°
- Longitude of ascending node: 68.494°
- Argument of perihelion: 20.173°
- Known satellites: 1 (Thorondor [θɔˈrɔndɔr])

Physical characteristics
- Dimensions: 150 km (volume equivalent for Manwë); 108 km (Thorondor)
- Mass: 1.41×10^{18} kg (Manwë); 5×10^{17} kg (Thorondor)
- Mean density: ~0.8 g/cm^{3}
- Synodic rotation period: 11.8819±0.00005 h (Manwë); 309.3 d (Thorondor)
- Axial tilt: 27° (relative to ecliptic); 12.5° (relative to orbit)
- Geometric albedo: 0.06 (Manwë); 0.09 (Thorondor)
- Spectral type: B−V = 1.07±0.09; V−R = 0.61±0.06; R−I = 0.61±0.04
- Absolute magnitude (H): 6.57; 7.15 (combined)

385446 Manwë ([ˈmanwɛ]), or (385446) Manwë–Thorondor ([θɔˈrɔndɔr], provisional designation 2003 QW_{111}), is a binary resonant Kuiper belt object in a 4:7 mean-motion resonance with Neptune. It was discovered on 25 August 2003, by American astronomer Marc Buie at Cerro Tololo Observatory in northern Chile. A study of Manwë's light curve in 2019 suggests that it may be a contact binary object.

== Discovery and naming ==
Manwë was discovered on 25 August 2003 by M. W. Buie at Cerro Tololo as a part of the Deep Ecliptic Survey. The object was named after Manwë, the fictional king of the Valar in J. R. R. Tolkien's Middle-earth legendarium. Manwë is foremost among the great spirits who rule the world, and takes special responsibility for the air and winds. Thorondor is the Lord of Eagles in the First Age in Tolkien's writing.

== Physical characteristics ==
Manwë has significant and irregular photometric variability, demonstrating that its components are not tidally locked. The surfaces of Manwë and Thorondor appear to be very red. The composition of Manwë is unknown but likely to be mostly ice, because the nominal density (with large uncertainty) is less than that of water. At least one other Kuiper belt object, 55637 Uni, has been found with a density of less than 1 g/cm^{3}, which implies an object made mostly of ice with a low rock fraction and high porosity.

== Orbit ==
Manwë orbits the Sun at an average distance of about 43.7 AU (6.54×10^{9} km), taking 289 years to complete a full orbit. Manwë has a low orbital inclination of 2.7 degrees. Its orbit is elongated, with an orbital eccentricity of 0.11. Due to its eccentric orbit, Manwë's distance from the Sun varies over the course of its orbit, approaching 38.8 AU at perihelion and 48.7 AU at aphelion. Manwë is in a 4:7 mean-motion orbital resonance with Neptune, meaning Manwë completes 4 orbits for every 7 orbits completed by Neptune.

== Satellite ==
=== Physical characteristics ===
Being part of a binary system, Manwë has one known companion named Thorondor, formally designated (385446) Manwë I. It is estimated to be about two-thirds the size of the primary, approximately 108 km (67 mi) for a volume equivalent diameter. The rotation period of Thorondor is uncertain, though a best-fit model suggests a very slow rotation period of 309.3 days. Thorondor's rotation is expected to be chaotic like Pluto's smaller moons, as a result of gravitational torquing by Manwë over the course of their eccentric mutual orbit. Thorondor's light curve has considerable photometric variability, with an amplitude of 0.55 magnitudes. This implies that Thorondor could have a very flattened shape, akin to the larger lobe of the contact binary Kuiper belt object 486958 Arrokoth. Assuming an ellipsoid shape for Thorondor, a best-fit model for its shape suggests the aspect ratios of a/c = 7.33 and b/c = 6.67.

=== Orbit ===
The satellite's orbit has the following parameters: semi-major-axis, 6674±41 km; period, 110.176±0.018 days; eccentricity, 0.5632±0.0070; and inclination, 25.58°±0.23°. The total system mass is about 1.94×10^{18} kg.

== Mutual events ==
Manwë and Thorondor were expected to go through a period of mutual occultations and transits from 2014 to 2018, where one object crosses in front of the other as seen from Earth. Pluto and Charon went through a similar series of mutual events from 1985 to 1990. Observations of these events could allow for better estimates of the radii of the two objects and their densities, as well as possibly determining their shapes and mapping surface color and albedo features. The first event, an inferior occultation, was predicted for 16 July 2014, and they continue until 25 October 2018.

The actual observations revealed none of the four predicted occultations, likely due to error measuring orbital period of Thorondor, although photometry data gathered during the observation campaign determined that Manwë is a highly bilobate contact binary.

== Exploration ==
The Manwë–Thorondor system has been researched for exploration, with the fastest trajectory launching on 9 April 2032, performing gravity assists at Jupiter and Neptune in 2033 and 2039 respectively, and arriving in March 2042 after only 10 years. Manwë would be 41 AU from the Sun at the time, and the spacecraft would have a flyby velocity of 20.1 km/s.

== See also ==
- 58534 Logos – a contact binary and potential triple system in the cold classical Kuiper belt
