= Meanings of minor-planet names: 53001–54000 =

As minor planet discoveries are confirmed, they are given a permanent number by the IAU's Minor Planet Center (MPC), and the discoverers can then submit names for them, following the IAU's naming conventions. The list below concerns those minor planets in the specified number-range that have received names, and explains the meanings of those names.

Official naming citations of newly named small Solar System bodies are approved and published in a bulletin by IAU's Working Group for Small Bodies Nomenclature (WGSBN). Before May 2021, citations were published in MPC's Minor Planet Circulars for many decades. Recent citations can also be found on the JPL Small-Body Database (SBDB). Until his death in 2016, German astronomer Lutz D. Schmadel compiled these citations into the Dictionary of Minor Planet Names (DMP) and regularly updated the collection.

Based on Paul Herget's The Names of the Minor Planets, Schmadel also researched the unclear origin of numerous asteroids, most of which had been named prior to World War II. This article incorporates text from this source, which is in the public domain: SBDB New namings may only be added to this list below after official publication as the preannouncement of names is condemned. The WGSBN publishes a comprehensive guideline for the naming rules of non-cometary small Solar System bodies.

== 53001–53100 ==
Named minor planet	Provisional	This minor planet was named for...	Ref · Catalog
53005 Antibes	1998 VW_{2}	A Greek trading post founded in the 5th century BCE, the city of Antibes Juan-les-Pins was fortified at various times.	IAU · 53005
53025 Willnoel	1998 WD	William Gerard Noel (1965–2024), British-American medieval manuscript expert, and former Associate University Librarian for Special Collections at Princeton University.	IAU · 53025
53029 Wodetzky	1998 WY_{6}	József Wodetzky (1872–1956), a Hungarian astronomer and mathematician who was director of the Astronomical Institute of Pázmány Péter University from 1934 to 1942. His research was in classical astronomy, mainly concerned with the three-body problem and the motion of the Moon.	JPL · 53029
53053 Sabinomaffeo	1998 XH_{9}	Father Sabino Maffeo, S.J. (1922–2025), a great educator in the Massimiliano Massimo Jesuit college in Rome, provincial of the Roman Province of the Society of Jesus and technical director of Vatican Radio.	IAU · 53053
53055 Astrogapra	1998 XT_{14}	GAPRA (Groupement d'Astronomie Populaire de la Région d'Antibes) is the leading astronomy association on the Côte d'Azur in Southern France.	IAU · 53055
53088 Mauricehirsch	1998 YF_{5}	Description available (see ref). Please summarize in your own words.	IAU · 53088
53088 Mauricehirsch	1998 YF_{5}	Maurice Hirsch (1902–1988), a French teacher.	IAU · 53088
53093 La Orotava	1998 YO_{12}	La Orotava, a town and municipality in the northern part of the Island of Tenerife	JPL · 53093

== 53101–53200 ==
back to top

Named minor planet	Provisional	This minor planet was named for...	Ref · Catalog
53109 Martinphillipps	1999 AD_{5}	Martin Phillipps (1963–2024), lead singer of the Dunedin rock band The Chills, whose music forms the backbone of the so-called "Dunedin sound."	IAU · 53109
53119 Matthiasgoerne	1999 AV_{20}	Matthias Goerne, German baritone.	IAU · 53119
53127 Adrienklotz	1999 AH_{25}	Adrien N. Klotz (b. 1999), a French amateur astronomer.	IAU · 53127
53137 Gabytutty	1999 BL_{4}	Gabriela Paz Protz Miqueles (b. 1988), a Chilean landscape architect and muralist.	IAU · 53137
53141 Marcmoniez	1999 BW_{6}	Marc Moniez, French astrophysicist, one of the founders of the EROS (Expérience de Recherche d’Objets Sombres) program, and one of the discoverers of the first gravitational microlensing effects.	IAU · 53141
53157 Akaishidake	1999 CP	Akaishidake Mountain, Shizuoka, Japan	JPL · 53157
53159 Mysliveček	1999 CN_{3}	Josef Mysliveček (1737–1781), a Czech composer from the period of early classicism. He worked in Italy (Il divino Boemo) beginning in 1763. He composed orchestral works, oratorios and operas.	JPL · 53159

== 53201–53300 ==
back to top

Named minor planet	Provisional	This minor planet was named for...	Ref · Catalog
53237 Simonson	1999 CU_{118}	Walter Simonson (born 1946) is an American comic book writer and artist.	JPL · 53237
53250 Beucher	1999 DY_{3}	Jacqueline Beucher (born 1947) has been a tireless promoter of astronomy for several decades. She has served in various official roles for the Astronomical Society of Kansas City and the Astronomical League. Beucher also has helped plan and organize many astronomy conventions and has led several solar eclipse tours.	JPL · 53250
53252 Sardegna	1999 EY_{4}	Sardinia, in Italian	JPL · 53252
53253 Zeiler	1999 EV_{5}	Michael Zeiler (born 1956) is a technical writer at the Environmental Systems Research Institute who helped develop the ArcGIS geographic information system	JPL · 53253
53256 Sinitiere	1999 FD	Robert Sinitiere (born 1950), an amateur astronomer and pharmacist.	JPL · 53256
53258 Kerryannlecky	1999 FN	Kerry-Ann Lecky Hepburn (born 1975) is a Canadian senior meteorologist at the Weather Network in Canada and an award-winning astrophotographer. She has been a member of the Toronto Chapter of the Royal Astronomical Society of Canada and actively inspires others to explore the night sky and develop their interest in astrophotography.	JPL · 53258
53285 Mojmír	1999 FM_{53}	Mojmír, ruler of the Great Moravian Empire from (830–845/46). He promoted Christianity in his empire, trying to attach Moravia to Western Europe.	JPL · 53285

== 53301–53400 ==
back to top

Named minor planet	Provisional	This minor planet was named for...	Ref · Catalog
53311 Deucalion	1999 HU_{11}	Deucalion, the Ancient Greek mythological Adam. After a flood in which all humans were drowned except for Deucalion and (his wife) Pyrrha, an oracle tells them to "throw the bones of their mother" behind them. Puzzled, they decided that their mother is Earth and her bones are stones. The stones they then threw over their shoulders sprang up into people to repopulate the world.	JPL · 53311
53316 Michielford	1999 JY_{3}	Michiel Ford, American amateur astronomer, recipient of a Milken National Educator Award	JPL · 53316

== 53401–53500 ==
back to top

Named minor planet	Provisional	This minor planet was named for...	Ref · Catalog
53435 Leonard	1999 VM_{40}	Gregory J. Leonard (b. 1963), an American geologist and planetary scientist.	IAU · 53435
53468 Varros	2000 AC_{2}	George Varros (born 1959) is an amateur astronomer who helped NASA's Meteoroid Environment Office popularize lunar-meteoroid-impact monitoring by amateur astronomers, for the purpose of assessing the dangers to future astronauts during prolonged visits to the lunar surface.	JPL · 53468

== 53501–53600 ==
back to top

Named minor planet	Provisional	This minor planet was named for...	Ref · Catalog
53537 Zhangyun	2000 AZ_{239}	Yun Zhang (born 1990) is a post-doctoral researcher at Université Côte d'Azur whose studies include the numerical modeling of asteroid surfaces and interiors, placing strong constraints on their mechanical and strength properties based on their observed physical properties.	IAU · 53537

== 53601–53700 ==
back to top

Named minor planet	Provisional	This minor planet was named for...	Ref · Catalog
53629 Andrewpotter	2000 CJ_{112}	Andrew E. Potter (born 1926) is a space scientist who discovered the sodium and potassium components of the atmospheres of both Mercury and the moon.	JPL · 53629
53640 Marché	2000 DT_{14}	Jordan Marché (born 1955) is an astronomy educator in planetaria, astronomy colleges and universities from Pennsylvania to Nevada. He has written on American planetaria, astronomers and other astronomical topics. Jordan has also been an amateur telescope maker publishing articles on optical designs and tests.	IAU · 53640

== 53701–53800 ==
back to top

Named minor planet	Provisional	This minor planet was named for...	Ref · Catalog
There are no named minor planets in this number range

== 53801–53900 ==
back to top

Named minor planet	Provisional	This minor planet was named for...	Ref · Catalog
53817 Gertrudebacon	2000 EO_{138}	Gertrude Bacon (1874–1949), a British aeronautical pioneer.	IAU · 53817
53818 Isispogson	2000 EV_{138}	Isis Pogson (1852–1945), a British astronomer and meteorologist.	IAU · 53818
53839 Schölkopf	2000 EY_{197}	Bernhard Schölkopf (b. 1968), the founder and director of the Max Planck Institute for Intelligent Systems and a professor at ETH Zurich.	IAU · 53839
53843 Antjiekrog	2000 FG_{10}	Antjie Krog (born 1952), a South African writer.	JPL · 53843

== 53901–54000 ==
back to top

Named minor planet	Provisional	This minor planet was named for...	Ref · Catalog
53910 Jánfischer	2000 GF_{4}	Ján Fischer (1905–1980) was a theoretical physicist and professor at Comenius University, Bratislava. He studied interaction between matter and electromagnetic radiation and significantly contributed to the quantum theory of photoelectric effect and Compton phenomenon.	JPL · 53910

back to top

Preceded by 52,001–53,000	Meanings of minor-planet names List of minor planets: 53,001–54,000	Succeeded by 54,001–55,000
