= List of minor planets: 53001–54000 =

The following is a partial list of minor planets, running from minor-planet number 53001 through 54000, inclusive. The primary data for this and other partial lists is based on JPL's "Small-Body Orbital Elements" and data available from the Minor Planet Center. Critical list information is also provided by the MPC, unless otherwise specified from Lowell Observatory. A detailed description of the table's columns and additional sources are given on the main page including a complete list of every page in this series, and a statistical break-up on the dynamical classification of minor planets.

Also see the summary list of all named bodies in numerical and alphabetical order, and the corresponding naming citations for the number range of this particular list. New namings may only be added to this list after official publication, as the preannouncement of names is condemned by the Working Group for Small Bodies Nomenclature of the International Astronomical Union.

| Near-Earth obj. | MBA (inner) | MBA (outer) | Centaur |
| Mars-crosser | MBA (middle) | Jupiter trojan | Trans-Neptunian obj. |
| Unclassified |

== 53001–53100 ==
| Designation | | | Discovery | | | Properties | | Ref |
| Permanent | Provisional | Named after | Date | Site | Discoverer(s) | Category | Diam. | Ref |
|---|---|---|---|---|---|---|---|---|
| 53001 | 1998 UL_{42} | — | October 28, 1998 | Socorro | LINEAR | V | 1.4 km | MPC · JPL |
| 53002 | 1998 UV_{42} | — | October 28, 1998 | Socorro | LINEAR | NYS | 2.8 km | MPC · JPL |
| 53003 | 1998 UO_{48} | — | October 17, 1998 | Anderson Mesa | LONEOS | V | 1.4 km | MPC · JPL |
| 53004 | 1998 VF_{2} | — | November 9, 1998 | Caussols | ODAS | · | 2.3 km | MPC · JPL |
| 53005 Antibes | 1998 VW_{2} | Antibes | November 10, 1998 | Caussols | ODAS | (2076) | 2.1 km | MPC · JPL |
| 53006 | 1998 VD_{4} | — | November 11, 1998 | Caussols | ODAS | NYS | 2.8 km | MPC · JPL |
| 53007 | 1998 VZ_{4} | — | November 11, 1998 | Socorro | LINEAR | · | 1.8 km | MPC · JPL |
| 53008 | 1998 VY_{5} | — | November 13, 1998 | Lime Creek | R. Linderholm | PHO | 5.1 km | MPC · JPL |
| 53009 | 1998 VR_{6} | — | November 12, 1998 | Oizumi | T. Kobayashi | · | 2.6 km | MPC · JPL |
| 53010 | 1998 VW_{8} | — | November 10, 1998 | Socorro | LINEAR | · | 3.2 km | MPC · JPL |
| 53011 | 1998 VH_{9} | — | November 10, 1998 | Socorro | LINEAR | · | 2.2 km | MPC · JPL |
| 53012 | 1998 VU_{9} | — | November 10, 1998 | Socorro | LINEAR | · | 2.6 km | MPC · JPL |
| 53013 | 1998 VF_{14} | — | November 10, 1998 | Socorro | LINEAR | EUN | 5.5 km | MPC · JPL |
| 53014 | 1998 VZ_{14} | — | November 10, 1998 | Socorro | LINEAR | · | 4.8 km | MPC · JPL |
| 53015 | 1998 VN_{18} | — | November 10, 1998 | Socorro | LINEAR | · | 3.1 km | MPC · JPL |
| 53016 | 1998 VB_{22} | — | November 10, 1998 | Socorro | LINEAR | · | 2.3 km | MPC · JPL |
| 53017 | 1998 VF_{26} | — | November 10, 1998 | Socorro | LINEAR | · | 2.0 km | MPC · JPL |
| 53018 | 1998 VO_{26} | — | November 10, 1998 | Socorro | LINEAR | NYS | 1.5 km | MPC · JPL |
| 53019 | 1998 VW_{32} | — | November 11, 1998 | Chichibu | N. Satō | · | 3.4 km | MPC · JPL |
| 53020 | 1998 VH_{33} | — | November 14, 1998 | Kitt Peak | Spacewatch | · | 2.1 km | MPC · JPL |
| 53021 | 1998 VX_{36} | — | November 10, 1998 | Socorro | LINEAR | · | 2.8 km | MPC · JPL |
| 53022 | 1998 VU_{44} | — | November 12, 1998 | Kushiro | S. Ueda, H. Kaneda | V | 2.3 km | MPC · JPL |
| 53023 | 1998 VD_{50} | — | November 11, 1998 | Socorro | LINEAR | · | 2.3 km | MPC · JPL |
| 53024 | 1998 VZ_{50} | — | November 13, 1998 | Socorro | LINEAR | · | 3.2 km | MPC · JPL |
| 53025 Willnoel | 1998 WD | Willnoel | November 16, 1998 | Catalina | CSS | · | 3.3 km | MPC · JPL |
| 53026 | 1998 WV_{3} | — | November 18, 1998 | Socorro | LINEAR | · | 2.9 km | MPC · JPL |
| 53027 | 1998 WM_{5} | — | November 20, 1998 | Gekko | T. Kagawa | · | 2.1 km | MPC · JPL |
| 53028 | 1998 WX_{5} | — | November 20, 1998 | Nachi-Katsuura | Y. Shimizu, T. Urata | · | 3.4 km | MPC · JPL |
| 53029 Wodetzky | 1998 WY_{6} | Wodetzky | November 22, 1998 | Piszkéstető | K. Sárneczky, L. Kiss | · | 4.1 km | MPC · JPL |
| 53030 | 1998 WC_{7} | — | November 18, 1998 | Kushiro | S. Ueda, H. Kaneda | · | 2.3 km | MPC · JPL |
| 53031 | 1998 WE_{7} | — | November 23, 1998 | Oohira | T. Urata | · | 4.8 km | MPC · JPL |
| 53032 | 1998 WE_{8} | — | November 25, 1998 | Oizumi | T. Kobayashi | · | 3.4 km | MPC · JPL |
| 53033 | 1998 WN_{9} | — | November 26, 1998 | Višnjan Observatory | K. Korlević | V | 1.7 km | MPC · JPL |
| 53034 | 1998 WO_{10} | — | November 21, 1998 | Socorro | LINEAR | V | 2.2 km | MPC · JPL |
| 53035 | 1998 WX_{10} | — | November 21, 1998 | Socorro | LINEAR | MAS | 2.3 km | MPC · JPL |
| 53036 | 1998 WQ_{13} | — | November 21, 1998 | Socorro | LINEAR | · | 3.2 km | MPC · JPL |
| 53037 | 1998 WZ_{13} | — | November 21, 1998 | Socorro | LINEAR | · | 2.5 km | MPC · JPL |
| 53038 | 1998 WT_{14} | — | November 21, 1998 | Socorro | LINEAR | NYS | 2.7 km | MPC · JPL |
| 53039 | 1998 WL_{15} | — | November 21, 1998 | Socorro | LINEAR | · | 2.5 km | MPC · JPL |
| 53040 | 1998 WN_{18} | — | November 21, 1998 | Socorro | LINEAR | · | 3.5 km | MPC · JPL |
| 53041 | 1998 WL_{20} | — | November 18, 1998 | Socorro | LINEAR | (2076) | 2.9 km | MPC · JPL |
| 53042 | 1998 WX_{20} | — | November 18, 1998 | Socorro | LINEAR | · | 1.8 km | MPC · JPL |
| 53043 | 1998 WY_{21} | — | November 18, 1998 | Socorro | LINEAR | · | 2.8 km | MPC · JPL |
| 53044 | 1998 WA_{22} | — | November 18, 1998 | Socorro | LINEAR | NYS | 2.6 km | MPC · JPL |
| 53045 | 1998 WS_{22} | — | November 18, 1998 | Socorro | LINEAR | · | 3.6 km | MPC · JPL |
| 53046 | 1998 WU_{22} | — | November 18, 1998 | Socorro | LINEAR | · | 3.0 km | MPC · JPL |
| 53047 | 1998 WK_{23} | — | November 18, 1998 | Socorro | LINEAR | · | 5.0 km | MPC · JPL |
| 53048 | 1998 WR_{28} | — | November 21, 1998 | Kitt Peak | Spacewatch | · | 3.2 km | MPC · JPL |
| 53049 | 1998 WM_{32} | — | November 17, 1998 | Socorro | LINEAR | PHO | 3.2 km | MPC · JPL |
| 53050 | 1998 WM_{41} | — | November 18, 1998 | Socorro | LINEAR | V | 2.0 km | MPC · JPL |
| 53051 | 1998 XT_{4} | — | December 12, 1998 | Oizumi | T. Kobayashi | V | 2.7 km | MPC · JPL |
| 53052 | 1998 XN_{8} | — | December 11, 1998 | Kitt Peak | Spacewatch | · | 6.7 km | MPC · JPL |
| 53053 Sabinomaffeo | 1998 XH_{9} | Sabinomaffeo | December 12, 1998 | San Marcello | M. Tombelli, G. Forti | · | 1.9 km | MPC · JPL |
| 53054 | 1998 XV_{11} | — | December 14, 1998 | Socorro | LINEAR | PHO | 3.1 km | MPC · JPL |
| 53055 Astrogapra | 1998 XT_{14} | Astrogapra | December 15, 1998 | Caussols | ODAS | · | 2.0 km | MPC · JPL |
| 53056 | 1998 XY_{14} | — | December 15, 1998 | Caussols | ODAS | slow | 5.6 km | MPC · JPL |
| 53057 | 1998 XZ_{16} | — | December 10, 1998 | Ondřejov | L. Kotková | · | 2.8 km | MPC · JPL |
| 53058 | 1998 XE_{18} | — | December 8, 1998 | Kitt Peak | Spacewatch | V | 1.7 km | MPC · JPL |
| 53059 | 1998 XH_{20} | — | December 10, 1998 | Kitt Peak | Spacewatch | · | 3.8 km | MPC · JPL |
| 53060 | 1998 XM_{21} | — | December 10, 1998 | Kitt Peak | Spacewatch | · | 3.9 km | MPC · JPL |
| 53061 | 1998 XN_{24} | — | December 11, 1998 | Kitt Peak | Spacewatch | · | 2.9 km | MPC · JPL |
| 53062 | 1998 XH_{28} | — | December 14, 1998 | Socorro | LINEAR | · | 3.0 km | MPC · JPL |
| 53063 | 1998 XM_{29} | — | December 14, 1998 | Socorro | LINEAR | V | 2.0 km | MPC · JPL |
| 53064 | 1998 XY_{34} | — | December 14, 1998 | Socorro | LINEAR | NYS · | 6.4 km | MPC · JPL |
| 53065 | 1998 XQ_{42} | — | December 14, 1998 | Socorro | LINEAR | V | 2.4 km | MPC · JPL |
| 53066 | 1998 XX_{44} | — | December 14, 1998 | Socorro | LINEAR | V | 2.3 km | MPC · JPL |
| 53067 | 1998 XY_{45} | — | December 14, 1998 | Socorro | LINEAR | V | 4.4 km | MPC · JPL |
| 53068 | 1998 XS_{47} | — | December 14, 1998 | Socorro | LINEAR | · | 4.5 km | MPC · JPL |
| 53069 | 1998 XC_{49} | — | December 14, 1998 | Socorro | LINEAR | ADE | 6.4 km | MPC · JPL |
| 53070 | 1998 XB_{52} | — | December 14, 1998 | Socorro | LINEAR | · | 5.2 km | MPC · JPL |
| 53071 | 1998 XO_{54} | — | December 15, 1998 | Socorro | LINEAR | · | 2.3 km | MPC · JPL |
| 53072 | 1998 XB_{61} | — | December 13, 1998 | Kitt Peak | Spacewatch | · | 4.2 km | MPC · JPL |
| 53073 | 1998 XL_{63} | — | December 14, 1998 | Socorro | LINEAR | · | 5.0 km | MPC · JPL |
| 53074 | 1998 XN_{64} | — | December 14, 1998 | Socorro | LINEAR | PHO | 3.6 km | MPC · JPL |
| 53075 | 1998 XQ_{66} | — | December 14, 1998 | Socorro | LINEAR | · | 4.5 km | MPC · JPL |
| 53076 | 1998 XV_{70} | — | December 14, 1998 | Socorro | LINEAR | · | 3.1 km | MPC · JPL |
| 53077 | 1998 XY_{72} | — | December 14, 1998 | Socorro | LINEAR | · | 2.4 km | MPC · JPL |
| 53078 | 1998 XX_{80} | — | December 15, 1998 | Socorro | LINEAR | · | 5.9 km | MPC · JPL |
| 53079 | 1998 XD_{81} | — | December 15, 1998 | Socorro | LINEAR | · | 3.1 km | MPC · JPL |
| 53080 | 1998 XC_{83} | — | December 15, 1998 | Socorro | LINEAR | V | 2.0 km | MPC · JPL |
| 53081 | 1998 XS_{86} | — | December 15, 1998 | Socorro | LINEAR | · | 2.5 km | MPC · JPL |
| 53082 | 1998 XV_{86} | — | December 15, 1998 | Socorro | LINEAR | ADE | 5.6 km | MPC · JPL |
| 53083 | 1998 XZ_{86} | — | December 15, 1998 | Socorro | LINEAR | · | 2.6 km | MPC · JPL |
| 53084 | 1998 XH_{89} | — | December 15, 1998 | Socorro | LINEAR | · | 3.3 km | MPC · JPL |
| 53085 | 1998 XV_{93} | — | December 15, 1998 | Socorro | LINEAR | PHO | 5.2 km | MPC · JPL |
| 53086 | 1998 XK_{95} | — | December 15, 1998 | Socorro | LINEAR | EUN | 4.3 km | MPC · JPL |
| 53087 | 1998 YQ | — | December 16, 1998 | Oizumi | T. Kobayashi | NYS | 1.9 km | MPC · JPL |
| 53088 Mauricehirsch | 1998 YF_{5} | Mauricehirsch | December 18, 1998 | Caussols | ODAS | · | 6.7 km | MPC · JPL |
| 53089 | 1998 YM_{5} | — | December 21, 1998 | Oizumi | T. Kobayashi | · | 5.6 km | MPC · JPL |
| 53090 | 1998 YS_{7} | — | December 24, 1998 | Catalina | CSS | PHO | 4.9 km | MPC · JPL |
| 53091 | 1998 YD_{8} | — | December 19, 1998 | Uenohara | N. Kawasato | MAR | 3.3 km | MPC · JPL |
| 53092 | 1998 YA_{12} | — | December 27, 1998 | Oizumi | T. Kobayashi | · | 3.6 km | MPC · JPL |
| 53093 La Orotava | 1998 YO_{12} | La Orotava | December 28, 1998 | Kleť | J. Tichá, M. Tichý | · | 2.0 km | MPC · JPL |
| 53094 | 1998 YW_{12} | — | December 16, 1998 | Kitt Peak | Spacewatch | · | 3.1 km | MPC · JPL |
| 53095 | 1998 YU_{16} | — | December 22, 1998 | Kitt Peak | Spacewatch | NYS | 2.7 km | MPC · JPL |
| 53096 | 1998 YK_{17} | — | December 22, 1998 | Kitt Peak | Spacewatch | EUN | 3.4 km | MPC · JPL |
| 53097 | 1998 YS_{17} | — | December 23, 1998 | Kitt Peak | Spacewatch | EUN | 5.2 km | MPC · JPL |
| 53098 | 1998 YM_{22} | — | December 29, 1998 | Xinglong | SCAP | · | 3.5 km | MPC · JPL |
| 53099 | 1998 YW_{29} | — | December 27, 1998 | Anderson Mesa | LONEOS | · | 4.4 km | MPC · JPL |
| 53100 | 1998 YH_{30} | — | December 24, 1998 | Anderson Mesa | LONEOS | HNS | 4.8 km | MPC · JPL |

== 53101–53200 ==
back to top

| Designation | | | Discovery | | | Properties | | Ref |
| Permanent | Provisional | Named after | Date | Site | Discoverer(s) | Category | Diam. | Ref |
|---|---|---|---|---|---|---|---|---|
| 53101 | 1999 AY | — | January 7, 1999 | Oizumi | T. Kobayashi | EOS | 7.6 km | MPC · JPL |
| 53102 | 1999 AZ | — | January 7, 1999 | Oizumi | T. Kobayashi | slow | 3.1 km | MPC · JPL |
| 53103 | 1999 AB_{2} | — | January 6, 1999 | Višnjan Observatory | K. Korlević | SUL | 4.9 km | MPC · JPL |
| 53104 | 1999 AP_{3} | — | January 10, 1999 | Oizumi | T. Kobayashi | · | 11 km | MPC · JPL |
| 53105 | 1999 AT_{3} | — | January 10, 1999 | Oizumi | T. Kobayashi | · | 4.7 km | MPC · JPL |
| 53106 | 1999 AG_{4} | — | January 6, 1999 | Višnjan Observatory | K. Korlević | · | 2.2 km | MPC · JPL |
| 53107 | 1999 AU_{4} | — | January 11, 1999 | Oizumi | T. Kobayashi | · | 5.1 km | MPC · JPL |
| 53108 | 1999 AW_{4} | — | January 11, 1999 | Oizumi | T. Kobayashi | · | 3.5 km | MPC · JPL |
| 53109 Martinphillipps | 1999 AD_{5} | Martinphillipps | January 12, 1999 | Cocoa | I. P. Griffin | · | 6.4 km | MPC · JPL |
| 53110 | 1999 AR_{7} | — | January 11, 1999 | Socorro | LINEAR | AMO +1km · moon | 1.6 km | MPC · JPL |
| 53111 | 1999 AJ_{8} | — | January 6, 1999 | Anderson Mesa | LONEOS | · | 6.4 km | MPC · JPL |
| 53112 | 1999 AK_{8} | — | January 6, 1999 | Anderson Mesa | LONEOS | (5) | 3.9 km | MPC · JPL |
| 53113 | 1999 AP_{8} | — | January 7, 1999 | Anderson Mesa | LONEOS | · | 2.1 km | MPC · JPL |
| 53114 | 1999 AV_{9} | — | January 10, 1999 | Xinglong | SCAP | · | 4.5 km | MPC · JPL |
| 53115 | 1999 AM_{14} | — | January 8, 1999 | Kitt Peak | Spacewatch | (29841) | 2.9 km | MPC · JPL |
| 53116 | 1999 AE_{17} | — | January 11, 1999 | Kitt Peak | Spacewatch | · | 3.1 km | MPC · JPL |
| 53117 | 1999 AW_{19} | — | January 13, 1999 | Kitt Peak | Spacewatch | HYG | 7.0 km | MPC · JPL |
| 53118 | 1999 AU_{20} | — | January 13, 1999 | Caussols | ODAS | · | 2.3 km | MPC · JPL |
| 53119 Matthiasgoerne | 1999 AV_{20} | Matthiasgoerne | January 13, 1999 | Caussols | ODAS | NYS | 1.3 km | MPC · JPL |
| 53120 | 1999 AE_{21} | — | January 13, 1999 | Gekko | T. Kagawa | PHO | 3.4 km | MPC · JPL |
| 53121 | 1999 AJ_{21} | — | January 14, 1999 | Višnjan Observatory | K. Korlević | ADE | 7.6 km | MPC · JPL |
| 53122 | 1999 AS_{22} | — | January 14, 1999 | Xinglong | SCAP | · | 3.4 km | MPC · JPL |
| 53123 | 1999 AB_{23} | — | January 15, 1999 | Oizumi | T. Kobayashi | EUN | 3.8 km | MPC · JPL |
| 53124 | 1999 AC_{23} | — | January 14, 1999 | Višnjan Observatory | K. Korlević | · | 10 km | MPC · JPL |
| 53125 | 1999 AL_{24} | — | January 15, 1999 | Catalina | CSS | · | 6.6 km | MPC · JPL |
| 53126 | 1999 AO_{24} | — | January 15, 1999 | Caussols | ODAS | · | 3.8 km | MPC · JPL |
| 53127 Adrienklotz | 1999 AH_{25} | Adrienklotz | January 15, 1999 | Caussols | ODAS | · | 6.8 km | MPC · JPL |
| 53128 | 1999 AS_{25} | — | January 15, 1999 | Caussols | ODAS | EOS | 5.7 km | MPC · JPL |
| 53129 | 1999 AY_{29} | — | January 13, 1999 | Kitt Peak | Spacewatch | (12739) | 4.0 km | MPC · JPL |
| 53130 | 1999 AY_{30} | — | January 14, 1999 | Kitt Peak | Spacewatch | · | 3.9 km | MPC · JPL |
| 53131 | 1999 AM_{31} | — | January 14, 1999 | Kitt Peak | Spacewatch | slow | 7.7 km | MPC · JPL |
| 53132 | 1999 AS_{31} | — | January 14, 1999 | Kitt Peak | Spacewatch | · | 3.5 km | MPC · JPL |
| 53133 | 1999 AQ_{34} | — | January 15, 1999 | Anderson Mesa | LONEOS | · | 3.8 km | MPC · JPL |
| 53134 | 1999 BG_{1} | — | January 18, 1999 | Kleť | Kleť | · | 7.1 km | MPC · JPL |
| 53135 | 1999 BA_{3} | — | January 19, 1999 | Oizumi | T. Kobayashi | · | 3.8 km | MPC · JPL |
| 53136 | 1999 BB_{3} | — | January 19, 1999 | Oizumi | T. Kobayashi | · | 3.8 km | MPC · JPL |
| 53137 Gabytutty | 1999 BL_{4} | Gabytutty | January 19, 1999 | Caussols | ODAS | · | 4.9 km | MPC · JPL |
| 53138 | 1999 BW_{4} | — | January 19, 1999 | Caussols | ODAS | · | 2.6 km | MPC · JPL |
| 53139 | 1999 BG_{5} | — | January 18, 1999 | Catalina | CSS | · | 6.3 km | MPC · JPL |
| 53140 | 1999 BT_{5} | — | January 20, 1999 | Višnjan Observatory | K. Korlević | · | 3.0 km | MPC · JPL |
| 53141 Marcmoniez | 1999 BW_{6} | Marcmoniez | January 21, 1999 | Caussols | ODAS | · | 7.9 km | MPC · JPL |
| 53142 | 1999 BR_{7} | — | January 21, 1999 | Višnjan Observatory | K. Korlević | · | 2.7 km | MPC · JPL |
| 53143 | 1999 BB_{9} | — | January 22, 1999 | Višnjan Observatory | K. Korlević | · | 4.6 km | MPC · JPL |
| 53144 | 1999 BN_{9} | — | January 22, 1999 | Woomera | F. B. Zoltowski | · | 2.5 km | MPC · JPL |
| 53145 | 1999 BT_{9} | — | January 24, 1999 | Farra d'Isonzo | Farra d'Isonzo | · | 2.2 km | MPC · JPL |
| 53146 | 1999 BG_{10} | — | January 23, 1999 | Višnjan Observatory | K. Korlević | DOR · | 6.2 km | MPC · JPL |
| 53147 | 1999 BB_{14} | — | January 22, 1999 | Caussols | ODAS | · | 6.7 km | MPC · JPL |
| 53148 | 1999 BV_{14} | — | January 18, 1999 | Uenohara | N. Kawasato | · | 2.7 km | MPC · JPL |
| 53149 | 1999 BZ_{14} | — | January 22, 1999 | Oohira | T. Urata | · | 4.8 km | MPC · JPL |
| 53150 | 1999 BV_{17} | — | January 16, 1999 | Socorro | LINEAR | · | 2.2 km | MPC · JPL |
| 53151 | 1999 BC_{24} | — | January 18, 1999 | Socorro | LINEAR | · | 2.2 km | MPC · JPL |
| 53152 | 1999 BH_{25} | — | January 18, 1999 | Socorro | LINEAR | · | 4.7 km | MPC · JPL |
| 53153 | 1999 BZ_{25} | — | January 25, 1999 | Oohira | T. Urata | · | 4.4 km | MPC · JPL |
| 53154 | 1999 BT_{27} | — | January 17, 1999 | Kitt Peak | Spacewatch | · | 2.6 km | MPC · JPL |
| 53155 | 1999 BB_{30} | — | January 19, 1999 | Kitt Peak | Spacewatch | · | 3.4 km | MPC · JPL |
| 53156 | 1999 CF | — | February 4, 1999 | Oizumi | T. Kobayashi | ADE | 7.2 km | MPC · JPL |
| 53157 Akaishidake | 1999 CP | Akaishidake | February 5, 1999 | Mishima | M. Akiyama | · | 7.0 km | MPC · JPL |
| 53158 | 1999 CW_{1} | — | February 7, 1999 | Oizumi | T. Kobayashi | MAR | 3.9 km | MPC · JPL |
| 53159 Mysliveček | 1999 CN_{3} | Mysliveček | February 10, 1999 | Ondřejov | P. Pravec | V | 2.0 km | MPC · JPL |
| 53160 | 1999 CO_{4} | — | February 11, 1999 | Oaxaca | Roe, J. M. | · | 4.3 km | MPC · JPL |
| 53161 | 1999 CP_{6} | — | February 10, 1999 | Socorro | LINEAR | · | 5.8 km | MPC · JPL |
| 53162 | 1999 CG_{7} | — | February 10, 1999 | Socorro | LINEAR | HNS | 5.8 km | MPC · JPL |
| 53163 | 1999 CK_{8} | — | February 13, 1999 | Oizumi | T. Kobayashi | · | 4.9 km | MPC · JPL |
| 53164 | 1999 CV_{9} | — | February 14, 1999 | Reedy Creek | J. Broughton | · | 5.8 km | MPC · JPL |
| 53165 | 1999 CX_{9} | — | February 12, 1999 | Bergisch Gladbach | W. Bickel | EOS | 7.1 km | MPC · JPL |
| 53166 | 1999 CG_{10} | — | February 15, 1999 | Oizumi | T. Kobayashi | · | 5.4 km | MPC · JPL |
| 53167 | 1999 CJ_{10} | — | February 15, 1999 | Oizumi | T. Kobayashi | MAR | 4.6 km | MPC · JPL |
| 53168 | 1999 CV_{10} | — | February 12, 1999 | Socorro | LINEAR | · | 9.9 km | MPC · JPL |
| 53169 | 1999 CA_{18} | — | February 10, 1999 | Socorro | LINEAR | V | 2.4 km | MPC · JPL |
| 53170 | 1999 CH_{19} | — | February 10, 1999 | Socorro | LINEAR | NYS · | 6.3 km | MPC · JPL |
| 53171 | 1999 CP_{21} | — | February 10, 1999 | Socorro | LINEAR | · | 5.3 km | MPC · JPL |
| 53172 | 1999 CQ_{21} | — | February 10, 1999 | Socorro | LINEAR | V | 3.3 km | MPC · JPL |
| 53173 | 1999 CF_{22} | — | February 10, 1999 | Socorro | LINEAR | · | 9.1 km | MPC · JPL |
| 53174 | 1999 CH_{28} | — | February 10, 1999 | Socorro | LINEAR | · | 10 km | MPC · JPL |
| 53175 | 1999 CP_{30} | — | February 10, 1999 | Socorro | LINEAR | · | 5.6 km | MPC · JPL |
| 53176 | 1999 CF_{31} | — | February 10, 1999 | Socorro | LINEAR | · | 3.2 km | MPC · JPL |
| 53177 | 1999 CR_{31} | — | February 10, 1999 | Socorro | LINEAR | BRA | 5.0 km | MPC · JPL |
| 53178 | 1999 CT_{35} | — | February 10, 1999 | Socorro | LINEAR | PHO | 6.3 km | MPC · JPL |
| 53179 | 1999 CB_{36} | — | February 10, 1999 | Socorro | LINEAR | · | 7.5 km | MPC · JPL |
| 53180 | 1999 CS_{38} | — | February 10, 1999 | Socorro | LINEAR | JUN · slow | 3.3 km | MPC · JPL |
| 53181 | 1999 CT_{40} | — | February 10, 1999 | Socorro | LINEAR | · | 5.0 km | MPC · JPL |
| 53182 | 1999 CW_{40} | — | February 10, 1999 | Socorro | LINEAR | · | 4.0 km | MPC · JPL |
| 53183 | 1999 CZ_{41} | — | February 10, 1999 | Socorro | LINEAR | · | 5.0 km | MPC · JPL |
| 53184 | 1999 CM_{43} | — | February 10, 1999 | Socorro | LINEAR | · | 4.4 km | MPC · JPL |
| 53185 | 1999 CZ_{44} | — | February 10, 1999 | Socorro | LINEAR | EUN | 5.8 km | MPC · JPL |
| 53186 | 1999 CB_{45} | — | February 10, 1999 | Socorro | LINEAR | EOS | 5.6 km | MPC · JPL |
| 53187 | 1999 CD_{48} | — | February 10, 1999 | Socorro | LINEAR | · | 6.5 km | MPC · JPL |
| 53188 | 1999 CM_{49} | — | February 10, 1999 | Socorro | LINEAR | RAF | 2.6 km | MPC · JPL |
| 53189 | 1999 CR_{49} | — | February 10, 1999 | Socorro | LINEAR | GEF | 3.8 km | MPC · JPL |
| 53190 | 1999 CT_{49} | — | February 10, 1999 | Socorro | LINEAR | · | 4.1 km | MPC · JPL |
| 53191 | 1999 CU_{49} | — | February 10, 1999 | Socorro | LINEAR | EUN | 3.2 km | MPC · JPL |
| 53192 | 1999 CB_{50} | — | February 10, 1999 | Socorro | LINEAR | · | 4.2 km | MPC · JPL |
| 53193 | 1999 CQ_{51} | — | February 10, 1999 | Socorro | LINEAR | EUN | 5.2 km | MPC · JPL |
| 53194 | 1999 CA_{52} | — | February 10, 1999 | Socorro | LINEAR | (5) | 4.2 km | MPC · JPL |
| 53195 | 1999 CL_{53} | — | February 10, 1999 | Socorro | LINEAR | · | 5.2 km | MPC · JPL |
| 53196 | 1999 CF_{55} | — | February 10, 1999 | Socorro | LINEAR | · | 5.5 km | MPC · JPL |
| 53197 | 1999 CR_{56} | — | February 10, 1999 | Socorro | LINEAR | EOS | 6.1 km | MPC · JPL |
| 53198 | 1999 CO_{60} | — | February 12, 1999 | Socorro | LINEAR | · | 3.9 km | MPC · JPL |
| 53199 | 1999 CL_{62} | — | February 12, 1999 | Socorro | LINEAR | · | 7.4 km | MPC · JPL |
| 53200 | 1999 CZ_{63} | — | February 12, 1999 | Socorro | LINEAR | · | 4.3 km | MPC · JPL |

== 53201–53300 ==
back to top

| Designation | | | Discovery | | | Properties | | Ref |
| Permanent | Provisional | Named after | Date | Site | Discoverer(s) | Category | Diam. | Ref |
|---|---|---|---|---|---|---|---|---|
| 53201 | 1999 CG_{70} | — | February 12, 1999 | Socorro | LINEAR | fast | 6.0 km | MPC · JPL |
| 53202 | 1999 CX_{72} | — | February 12, 1999 | Socorro | LINEAR | · | 3.6 km | MPC · JPL |
| 53203 | 1999 CA_{73} | — | February 12, 1999 | Socorro | LINEAR | · | 4.5 km | MPC · JPL |
| 53204 | 1999 CZ_{73} | — | February 12, 1999 | Socorro | LINEAR | MAR · slow | 2.8 km | MPC · JPL |
| 53205 | 1999 CA_{74} | — | February 12, 1999 | Socorro | LINEAR | · | 8.5 km | MPC · JPL |
| 53206 | 1999 CK_{74} | — | February 12, 1999 | Socorro | LINEAR | · | 3.9 km | MPC · JPL |
| 53207 | 1999 CQ_{74} | — | February 12, 1999 | Socorro | LINEAR | · | 3.7 km | MPC · JPL |
| 53208 | 1999 CE_{75} | — | February 12, 1999 | Socorro | LINEAR | · | 5.5 km | MPC · JPL |
| 53209 | 1999 CQ_{75} | — | February 12, 1999 | Socorro | LINEAR | · | 9.7 km | MPC · JPL |
| 53210 | 1999 CE_{76} | — | February 12, 1999 | Socorro | LINEAR | · | 6.5 km | MPC · JPL |
| 53211 | 1999 CY_{77} | — | February 12, 1999 | Socorro | LINEAR | EUN | 3.5 km | MPC · JPL |
| 53212 | 1999 CD_{80} | — | February 12, 1999 | Socorro | LINEAR | EUN | 3.9 km | MPC · JPL |
| 53213 | 1999 CU_{80} | — | February 12, 1999 | Socorro | LINEAR | EUN | 3.5 km | MPC · JPL |
| 53214 | 1999 CZ_{82} | — | February 10, 1999 | Socorro | LINEAR | V | 2.1 km | MPC · JPL |
| 53215 | 1999 CC_{83} | — | February 10, 1999 | Socorro | LINEAR | · | 3.3 km | MPC · JPL |
| 53216 | 1999 CX_{83} | — | February 10, 1999 | Socorro | LINEAR | (194) | 5.7 km | MPC · JPL |
| 53217 | 1999 CS_{86} | — | February 10, 1999 | Socorro | LINEAR | · | 4.6 km | MPC · JPL |
| 53218 | 1999 CN_{88} | — | February 10, 1999 | Socorro | LINEAR | · | 3.9 km | MPC · JPL |
| 53219 | 1999 CO_{88} | — | February 10, 1999 | Socorro | LINEAR | EUN | 3.8 km | MPC · JPL |
| 53220 | 1999 CM_{89} | — | February 10, 1999 | Socorro | LINEAR | · | 5.9 km | MPC · JPL |
| 53221 | 1999 CU_{89} | — | February 10, 1999 | Socorro | LINEAR | EUN | 3.3 km | MPC · JPL |
| 53222 | 1999 CX_{92} | — | February 10, 1999 | Socorro | LINEAR | MAR | 4.3 km | MPC · JPL |
| 53223 | 1999 CX_{93} | — | February 10, 1999 | Socorro | LINEAR | EOS · slow | 5.1 km | MPC · JPL |
| 53224 | 1999 CA_{94} | — | February 10, 1999 | Socorro | LINEAR | · | 3.8 km | MPC · JPL |
| 53225 | 1999 CG_{94} | — | February 10, 1999 | Socorro | LINEAR | · | 8.0 km | MPC · JPL |
| 53226 | 1999 CB_{98} | — | February 10, 1999 | Socorro | LINEAR | · | 3.1 km | MPC · JPL |
| 53227 | 1999 CH_{98} | — | February 10, 1999 | Socorro | LINEAR | AST | 6.8 km | MPC · JPL |
| 53228 | 1999 CA_{100} | — | February 10, 1999 | Socorro | LINEAR | · | 6.8 km | MPC · JPL |
| 53229 | 1999 CL_{100} | — | February 10, 1999 | Socorro | LINEAR | · | 6.0 km | MPC · JPL |
| 53230 | 1999 CP_{103} | — | February 12, 1999 | Socorro | LINEAR | · | 3.1 km | MPC · JPL |
| 53231 | 1999 CN_{112} | — | February 12, 1999 | Socorro | LINEAR | EOS | 5.0 km | MPC · JPL |
| 53232 | 1999 CD_{113} | — | February 12, 1999 | Socorro | LINEAR | · | 5.9 km | MPC · JPL |
| 53233 | 1999 CO_{117} | — | February 12, 1999 | Socorro | LINEAR | EUN | 5.0 km | MPC · JPL |
| 53234 | 1999 CU_{117} | — | February 12, 1999 | Socorro | LINEAR | · | 4.5 km | MPC · JPL |
| 53235 | 1999 CZ_{117} | — | February 12, 1999 | Socorro | LINEAR | · | 7.1 km | MPC · JPL |
| 53236 | 1999 CC_{118} | — | February 12, 1999 | Socorro | LINEAR | · | 4.5 km | MPC · JPL |
| 53237 Simonson | 1999 CU_{118} | Simonson | February 9, 1999 | Goodricke-Pigott | R. A. Tucker | · | 5.3 km | MPC · JPL |
| 53238 | 1999 CM_{121} | — | February 11, 1999 | Socorro | LINEAR | · | 12 km | MPC · JPL |
| 53239 | 1999 CE_{123} | — | February 11, 1999 | Socorro | LINEAR | · | 4.7 km | MPC · JPL |
| 53240 | 1999 CT_{126} | — | February 11, 1999 | Socorro | LINEAR | · | 5.1 km | MPC · JPL |
| 53241 | 1999 CU_{128} | — | February 11, 1999 | Socorro | LINEAR | EUN · | 3.3 km | MPC · JPL |
| 53242 | 1999 CH_{138} | — | February 11, 1999 | Kitt Peak | Spacewatch | · | 3.4 km | MPC · JPL |
| 53243 | 1999 CW_{140} | — | February 9, 1999 | Kitt Peak | Spacewatch | · | 3.5 km | MPC · JPL |
| 53244 | 1999 CY_{145} | — | February 8, 1999 | Kitt Peak | Spacewatch | · | 5.0 km | MPC · JPL |
| 53245 | 1999 CH_{152} | — | February 12, 1999 | Kitt Peak | Spacewatch | · | 3.7 km | MPC · JPL |
| 53246 | 1999 DA_{2} | — | February 18, 1999 | Haleakala | NEAT | · | 3.6 km | MPC · JPL |
| 53247 | 1999 DE_{2} | — | February 17, 1999 | Reedy Creek | J. Broughton | EUN | 5.6 km | MPC · JPL |
| 53248 | 1999 DA_{3} | — | February 21, 1999 | Oizumi | T. Kobayashi | · | 5.3 km | MPC · JPL |
| 53249 | 1999 DD_{3} | — | February 20, 1999 | Prescott | P. G. Comba | MRX | 2.3 km | MPC · JPL |
| 53250 Beucher | 1999 DY_{3} | Beucher | February 20, 1999 | Goodricke-Pigott | R. A. Tucker | · | 4.5 km | MPC · JPL |
| 53251 | 1999 EV_{3} | — | March 12, 1999 | Kitt Peak | Spacewatch | EOS | 4.2 km | MPC · JPL |
| 53252 Sardegna | 1999 EY_{4} | Sardegna | March 13, 1999 | Gnosca | S. Sposetti | · | 5.6 km | MPC · JPL |
| 53253 Zeiler | 1999 EV_{5} | Zeiler | March 13, 1999 | Goodricke-Pigott | R. A. Tucker | · | 3.9 km | MPC · JPL |
| 53254 | 1999 ES_{10} | — | March 14, 1999 | Kitt Peak | Spacewatch | EOS | 3.4 km | MPC · JPL |
| 53255 | 1999 EE_{11} | — | March 14, 1999 | Kitt Peak | Spacewatch | · | 10 km | MPC · JPL |
| 53256 Sinitiere | 1999 FD | Sinitiere | March 16, 1999 | Baton Rouge | W. R. Cooney Jr. | · | 4.5 km | MPC · JPL |
| 53257 | 1999 FF | — | March 16, 1999 | Baton Rouge | W. R. Cooney Jr. | KOR | 4.7 km | MPC · JPL |
| 53258 Kerryannlecky | 1999 FN | Kerryannlecky | March 17, 1999 | Caussols | ODAS | EUN | 4.2 km | MPC · JPL |
| 53259 | 1999 FQ_{1} | — | March 16, 1999 | Kitt Peak | Spacewatch | EOS | 3.8 km | MPC · JPL |
| 53260 | 1999 FX_{1} | — | March 16, 1999 | Kitt Peak | Spacewatch | HYG | 6.4 km | MPC · JPL |
| 53261 | 1999 FR_{4} | — | March 17, 1999 | Kitt Peak | Spacewatch | KOR | 3.1 km | MPC · JPL |
| 53262 | 1999 FE_{6} | — | March 16, 1999 | Caussols | ODAS | · | 2.5 km | MPC · JPL |
| 53263 | 1999 FW_{6} | — | March 25, 1999 | Ondřejov | L. Kotková | EMA | 10 km | MPC · JPL |
| 53264 | 1999 FL_{8} | — | March 20, 1999 | Socorro | LINEAR | · | 5.7 km | MPC · JPL |
| 53265 | 1999 FB_{11} | — | March 17, 1999 | Kitt Peak | Spacewatch | · | 5.4 km | MPC · JPL |
| 53266 | 1999 FY_{11} | — | March 18, 1999 | Kitt Peak | Spacewatch | · | 5.1 km | MPC · JPL |
| 53267 | 1999 FP_{17} | — | March 23, 1999 | Kitt Peak | Spacewatch | · | 6.4 km | MPC · JPL |
| 53268 | 1999 FU_{18} | — | March 22, 1999 | Anderson Mesa | LONEOS | · | 7.5 km | MPC · JPL |
| 53269 | 1999 FY_{18} | — | March 22, 1999 | Anderson Mesa | LONEOS | · | 3.8 km | MPC · JPL |
| 53270 | 1999 FR_{22} | — | March 19, 1999 | Socorro | LINEAR | · | 5.2 km | MPC · JPL |
| 53271 | 1999 FJ_{24} | — | March 19, 1999 | Socorro | LINEAR | · | 5.3 km | MPC · JPL |
| 53272 | 1999 FK_{24} | — | March 19, 1999 | Socorro | LINEAR | THB | 11 km | MPC · JPL |
| 53273 | 1999 FZ_{24} | — | March 19, 1999 | Socorro | LINEAR | EOS | 7.2 km | MPC · JPL |
| 53274 | 1999 FH_{25} | — | March 19, 1999 | Socorro | LINEAR | · | 3.6 km | MPC · JPL |
| 53275 | 1999 FN_{31} | — | March 19, 1999 | Socorro | LINEAR | (16286) | 5.6 km | MPC · JPL |
| 53276 | 1999 FO_{32} | — | March 19, 1999 | Socorro | LINEAR | · | 6.5 km | MPC · JPL |
| 53277 | 1999 FU_{32} | — | March 24, 1999 | Višnjan Observatory | K. Korlević | · | 6.1 km | MPC · JPL |
| 53278 | 1999 FH_{33} | — | March 19, 1999 | Socorro | LINEAR | DOR | 5.9 km | MPC · JPL |
| 53279 | 1999 FJ_{33} | — | March 19, 1999 | Socorro | LINEAR | · | 4.6 km | MPC · JPL |
| 53280 | 1999 FN_{33} | — | March 19, 1999 | Socorro | LINEAR | · | 6.1 km | MPC · JPL |
| 53281 | 1999 FS_{33} | — | March 19, 1999 | Socorro | LINEAR | · | 8.3 km | MPC · JPL |
| 53282 | 1999 FT_{34} | — | March 19, 1999 | Socorro | LINEAR | · | 4.3 km | MPC · JPL |
| 53283 | 1999 FG_{42} | — | March 20, 1999 | Socorro | LINEAR | · | 4.0 km | MPC · JPL |
| 53284 | 1999 FK_{47} | — | March 20, 1999 | Socorro | LINEAR | RAF | 5.0 km | MPC · JPL |
| 53285 Mojmír | 1999 FM_{53} | Mojmír | March 24, 1999 | Ondřejov | Ondrejov | · | 7.2 km | MPC · JPL |
| 53286 | 1999 FH_{57} | — | March 20, 1999 | Socorro | LINEAR | MAR | 3.9 km | MPC · JPL |
| 53287 | 1999 GR | — | April 5, 1999 | Višnjan Observatory | K. Korlević | EOS | 6.7 km | MPC · JPL |
| 53288 | 1999 GO_{1} | — | April 6, 1999 | Kitt Peak | Spacewatch | KOR | 4.7 km | MPC · JPL |
| 53289 | 1999 GD_{5} | — | April 7, 1999 | Nachi-Katsuura | Y. Shimizu, T. Urata | · | 4.6 km | MPC · JPL |
| 53290 | 1999 GY_{8} | — | April 10, 1999 | Anderson Mesa | LONEOS | · | 5.7 km | MPC · JPL |
| 53291 | 1999 GQ_{10} | — | April 11, 1999 | Kitt Peak | Spacewatch | · | 6.2 km | MPC · JPL |
| 53292 | 1999 GY_{10} | — | April 11, 1999 | Kitt Peak | Spacewatch | THM | 5.2 km | MPC · JPL |
| 53293 | 1999 GA_{14} | — | April 14, 1999 | Kitt Peak | Spacewatch | · | 6.3 km | MPC · JPL |
| 53294 | 1999 GS_{16} | — | April 15, 1999 | Socorro | LINEAR | GEF | 4.6 km | MPC · JPL |
| 53295 | 1999 GX_{20} | — | April 15, 1999 | Socorro | LINEAR | · | 3.7 km | MPC · JPL |
| 53296 | 1999 GJ_{23} | — | April 6, 1999 | Socorro | LINEAR | · | 5.4 km | MPC · JPL |
| 53297 | 1999 GR_{23} | — | April 6, 1999 | Socorro | LINEAR | · | 3.6 km | MPC · JPL |
| 53298 | 1999 GF_{25} | — | April 6, 1999 | Socorro | LINEAR | KOR | 6.5 km | MPC · JPL |
| 53299 | 1999 GJ_{26} | — | April 7, 1999 | Socorro | LINEAR | KOR | 3.5 km | MPC · JPL |
| 53300 | 1999 GD_{31} | — | April 7, 1999 | Socorro | LINEAR | · | 4.3 km | MPC · JPL |

== 53301–53400 ==
back to top

| Designation | | | Discovery | | | Properties | | Ref |
| Permanent | Provisional | Named after | Date | Site | Discoverer(s) | Category | Diam. | Ref |
|---|---|---|---|---|---|---|---|---|
| 53301 | 1999 GL_{34} | — | April 6, 1999 | Socorro | LINEAR | (5) | 3.6 km | MPC · JPL |
| 53302 | 1999 GZ_{34} | — | April 6, 1999 | Socorro | LINEAR | MAR | 4.0 km | MPC · JPL |
| 53303 | 1999 GF_{45} | — | April 12, 1999 | Socorro | LINEAR | · | 8.6 km | MPC · JPL |
| 53304 | 1999 GQ_{47} | — | April 6, 1999 | Anderson Mesa | LONEOS | ADE | 7.7 km | MPC · JPL |
| 53305 | 1999 GQ_{53} | — | April 11, 1999 | Anderson Mesa | LONEOS | · | 7.2 km | MPC · JPL |
| 53306 | 1999 HA_{3} | — | April 24, 1999 | Reedy Creek | J. Broughton | EOS | 6.3 km | MPC · JPL |
| 53307 | 1999 HC_{8} | — | April 20, 1999 | Kitt Peak | Spacewatch | · | 4.3 km | MPC · JPL |
| 53308 | 1999 HJ_{8} | — | April 16, 1999 | Socorro | LINEAR | · | 4.6 km | MPC · JPL |
| 53309 | 1999 HT_{8} | — | April 17, 1999 | Socorro | LINEAR | · | 3.8 km | MPC · JPL |
| 53310 | 1999 HY_{9} | — | April 17, 1999 | Socorro | LINEAR | · | 6.3 km | MPC · JPL |
| 53311 Deucalion | 1999 HU_{11} | Deucalion | April 18, 1999 | Kitt Peak | Deep Ecliptic Survey | cubewano (cold) | 155 km | MPC · JPL |
| 53312 | 1999 JZ | — | May 7, 1999 | Socorro | LINEAR | · | 8.8 km | MPC · JPL |
| 53313 | 1999 JF_{2} | — | May 8, 1999 | Catalina | CSS | · | 5.1 km | MPC · JPL |
| 53314 | 1999 JT_{2} | — | May 7, 1999 | Xinglong | SCAP | · | 5.8 km | MPC · JPL |
| 53315 | 1999 JD_{3} | — | May 10, 1999 | High Point | D. K. Chesney | ADE | 8.6 km | MPC · JPL |
| 53316 Michielford | 1999 JY_{3} | Michielford | May 9, 1999 | Farpoint | G. Hug | · | 3.4 km | MPC · JPL |
| 53317 | 1999 JJ_{6} | — | May 13, 1999 | Socorro | LINEAR | · | 9.0 km | MPC · JPL |
| 53318 | 1999 JV_{7} | — | May 13, 1999 | Reedy Creek | J. Broughton | EUN | 4.6 km | MPC · JPL |
| 53319 | 1999 JM_{8} | — | May 13, 1999 | Socorro | LINEAR | T_{j} (2.99) · APO +1km · PHA · slow | 7.0 km | MPC · JPL |
| 53320 | 1999 JW_{8} | — | May 14, 1999 | Prescott | P. G. Comba | · | 4.7 km | MPC · JPL |
| 53321 | 1999 JL_{12} | — | May 8, 1999 | Catalina | CSS | · | 3.9 km | MPC · JPL |
| 53322 | 1999 JK_{15} | — | May 15, 1999 | Catalina | CSS | · | 5.4 km | MPC · JPL |
| 53323 | 1999 JV_{16} | — | May 15, 1999 | Kitt Peak | Spacewatch | EOS | 6.3 km | MPC · JPL |
| 53324 | 1999 JZ_{18} | — | May 10, 1999 | Socorro | LINEAR | · | 5.7 km | MPC · JPL |
| 53325 | 1999 JN_{21} | — | May 10, 1999 | Socorro | LINEAR | · | 6.9 km | MPC · JPL |
| 53326 | 1999 JV_{22} | — | May 10, 1999 | Socorro | LINEAR | · | 6.4 km | MPC · JPL |
| 53327 | 1999 JL_{23} | — | May 10, 1999 | Socorro | LINEAR | · | 6.5 km | MPC · JPL |
| 53328 | 1999 JS_{26} | — | May 10, 1999 | Socorro | LINEAR | · | 3.7 km | MPC · JPL |
| 53329 | 1999 JK_{27} | — | May 10, 1999 | Socorro | LINEAR | · | 3.4 km | MPC · JPL |
| 53330 | 1999 JN_{32} | — | May 10, 1999 | Socorro | LINEAR | EOS | 7.3 km | MPC · JPL |
| 53331 | 1999 JW_{34} | — | May 10, 1999 | Socorro | LINEAR | EOS | 8.7 km | MPC · JPL |
| 53332 | 1999 JL_{36} | — | May 10, 1999 | Socorro | LINEAR | · | 4.0 km | MPC · JPL |
| 53333 | 1999 JZ_{36} | — | May 10, 1999 | Socorro | LINEAR | EOS | 5.5 km | MPC · JPL |
| 53334 | 1999 JJ_{41} | — | May 13, 1999 | Socorro | LINEAR | EOS | 4.4 km | MPC · JPL |
| 53335 | 1999 JL_{41} | — | May 10, 1999 | Socorro | LINEAR | EOS | 5.8 km | MPC · JPL |
| 53336 | 1999 JP_{42} | — | May 10, 1999 | Socorro | LINEAR | · | 13 km | MPC · JPL |
| 53337 | 1999 JX_{42} | — | May 10, 1999 | Socorro | LINEAR | slow | 8.9 km | MPC · JPL |
| 53338 | 1999 JY_{46} | — | May 10, 1999 | Socorro | LINEAR | KOR | 4.8 km | MPC · JPL |
| 53339 | 1999 JA_{47} | — | May 10, 1999 | Socorro | LINEAR | KOR | 5.4 km | MPC · JPL |
| 53340 | 1999 JH_{47} | — | May 10, 1999 | Socorro | LINEAR | · | 9.0 km | MPC · JPL |
| 53341 | 1999 JP_{49} | — | May 10, 1999 | Socorro | LINEAR | EOS | 7.0 km | MPC · JPL |
| 53342 | 1999 JK_{51} | — | May 10, 1999 | Socorro | LINEAR | (5) | 4.0 km | MPC · JPL |
| 53343 | 1999 JO_{54} | — | May 10, 1999 | Socorro | LINEAR | EUN | 6.1 km | MPC · JPL |
| 53344 | 1999 JX_{54} | — | May 10, 1999 | Socorro | LINEAR | EUN | 4.9 km | MPC · JPL |
| 53345 | 1999 JZ_{54} | — | May 10, 1999 | Socorro | LINEAR | · | 7.5 km | MPC · JPL |
| 53346 | 1999 JE_{57} | — | May 10, 1999 | Socorro | LINEAR | · | 10 km | MPC · JPL |
| 53347 | 1999 JE_{58} | — | May 10, 1999 | Socorro | LINEAR | · | 14 km | MPC · JPL |
| 53348 | 1999 JC_{59} | — | May 10, 1999 | Socorro | LINEAR | EUN | 5.0 km | MPC · JPL |
| 53349 | 1999 JM_{61} | — | May 10, 1999 | Socorro | LINEAR | · | 5.9 km | MPC · JPL |
| 53350 | 1999 JD_{65} | — | May 12, 1999 | Socorro | LINEAR | · | 5.2 km | MPC · JPL |
| 53351 | 1999 JF_{66} | — | May 12, 1999 | Socorro | LINEAR | · | 7.7 km | MPC · JPL |
| 53352 | 1999 JL_{67} | — | May 12, 1999 | Socorro | LINEAR | · | 5.6 km | MPC · JPL |
| 53353 | 1999 JC_{70} | — | May 12, 1999 | Socorro | LINEAR | · | 5.3 km | MPC · JPL |
| 53354 | 1999 JG_{70} | — | May 12, 1999 | Socorro | LINEAR | · | 8.6 km | MPC · JPL |
| 53355 | 1999 JD_{71} | — | May 12, 1999 | Socorro | LINEAR | EOS | 6.5 km | MPC · JPL |
| 53356 | 1999 JJ_{71} | — | May 12, 1999 | Socorro | LINEAR | · | 6.5 km | MPC · JPL |
| 53357 | 1999 JM_{73} | — | May 12, 1999 | Socorro | LINEAR | · | 4.2 km | MPC · JPL |
| 53358 | 1999 JO_{73} | — | May 12, 1999 | Socorro | LINEAR | · | 10 km | MPC · JPL |
| 53359 | 1999 JM_{74} | — | May 12, 1999 | Socorro | LINEAR | EOS | 5.8 km | MPC · JPL |
| 53360 | 1999 JU_{75} | — | May 10, 1999 | Socorro | LINEAR | · | 6.9 km | MPC · JPL |
| 53361 | 1999 JF_{76} | — | May 10, 1999 | Socorro | LINEAR | · | 5.1 km | MPC · JPL |
| 53362 | 1999 JY_{76} | — | May 12, 1999 | Socorro | LINEAR | · | 7.6 km | MPC · JPL |
| 53363 | 1999 JD_{77} | — | May 12, 1999 | Socorro | LINEAR | · | 5.3 km | MPC · JPL |
| 53364 | 1999 JL_{77} | — | May 12, 1999 | Socorro | LINEAR | EOS | 8.2 km | MPC · JPL |
| 53365 | 1999 JO_{78} | — | May 13, 1999 | Socorro | LINEAR | · | 5.1 km | MPC · JPL |
| 53366 | 1999 JU_{79} | — | May 13, 1999 | Socorro | LINEAR | EUP | 13 km | MPC · JPL |
| 53367 | 1999 JR_{80} | — | May 12, 1999 | Socorro | LINEAR | · | 9.4 km | MPC · JPL |
| 53368 | 1999 JF_{81} | — | May 14, 1999 | Socorro | LINEAR | EUN | 4.8 km | MPC · JPL |
| 53369 | 1999 JQ_{81} | — | May 12, 1999 | Socorro | LINEAR | · | 2.1 km | MPC · JPL |
| 53370 | 1999 JY_{81} | — | May 12, 1999 | Socorro | LINEAR | · | 4.9 km | MPC · JPL |
| 53371 | 1999 JA_{83} | — | May 12, 1999 | Socorro | LINEAR | EUN · slow | 4.0 km | MPC · JPL |
| 53372 | 1999 JB_{83} | — | May 12, 1999 | Socorro | LINEAR | · | 5.9 km | MPC · JPL |
| 53373 | 1999 JP_{83} | — | May 12, 1999 | Socorro | LINEAR | · | 4.0 km | MPC · JPL |
| 53374 | 1999 JC_{84} | — | May 12, 1999 | Socorro | LINEAR | · | 5.4 km | MPC · JPL |
| 53375 | 1999 JF_{86} | — | May 12, 1999 | Socorro | LINEAR | · | 5.2 km | MPC · JPL |
| 53376 | 1999 JJ_{86} | — | May 12, 1999 | Socorro | LINEAR | · | 6.3 km | MPC · JPL |
| 53377 | 1999 JQ_{86} | — | May 12, 1999 | Socorro | LINEAR | KOR | 5.1 km | MPC · JPL |
| 53378 | 1999 JO_{87} | — | May 12, 1999 | Socorro | LINEAR | EOS | 7.0 km | MPC · JPL |
| 53379 | 1999 JZ_{88} | — | May 12, 1999 | Socorro | LINEAR | · | 4.6 km | MPC · JPL |
| 53380 | 1999 JS_{89} | — | May 12, 1999 | Socorro | LINEAR | EOS | 6.1 km | MPC · JPL |
| 53381 | 1999 JK_{90} | — | May 12, 1999 | Socorro | LINEAR | · | 5.8 km | MPC · JPL |
| 53382 | 1999 JL_{91} | — | May 12, 1999 | Socorro | LINEAR | · | 5.6 km | MPC · JPL |
| 53383 | 1999 JO_{91} | — | May 12, 1999 | Socorro | LINEAR | · | 9.1 km | MPC · JPL |
| 53384 | 1999 JY_{92} | — | May 12, 1999 | Socorro | LINEAR | · | 7.4 km | MPC · JPL |
| 53385 | 1999 JB_{93} | — | May 12, 1999 | Socorro | LINEAR | URS | 10 km | MPC · JPL |
| 53386 | 1999 JF_{93} | — | May 12, 1999 | Socorro | LINEAR | · | 11 km | MPC · JPL |
| 53387 | 1999 JF_{94} | — | May 12, 1999 | Socorro | LINEAR | · | 7.6 km | MPC · JPL |
| 53388 | 1999 JZ_{95} | — | May 12, 1999 | Socorro | LINEAR | · | 6.4 km | MPC · JPL |
| 53389 | 1999 JZ_{96} | — | May 12, 1999 | Socorro | LINEAR | · | 6.1 km | MPC · JPL |
| 53390 | 1999 JM_{100} | — | May 12, 1999 | Socorro | LINEAR | EUN | 3.6 km | MPC · JPL |
| 53391 | 1999 JX_{100} | — | May 12, 1999 | Socorro | LINEAR | EUP | 11 km | MPC · JPL |
| 53392 | 1999 JZ_{100} | — | May 12, 1999 | Socorro | LINEAR | · | 6.0 km | MPC · JPL |
| 53393 | 1999 JA_{102} | — | May 13, 1999 | Socorro | LINEAR | · | 4.3 km | MPC · JPL |
| 53394 | 1999 JD_{102} | — | May 13, 1999 | Socorro | LINEAR | · | 4.3 km | MPC · JPL |
| 53395 | 1999 JZ_{102} | — | May 13, 1999 | Socorro | LINEAR | · | 3.6 km | MPC · JPL |
| 53396 | 1999 JL_{104} | — | May 15, 1999 | Socorro | LINEAR | fast | 4.5 km | MPC · JPL |
| 53397 | 1999 JJ_{107} | — | May 13, 1999 | Socorro | LINEAR | EOS · slow | 4.7 km | MPC · JPL |
| 53398 | 1999 JM_{111} | — | May 13, 1999 | Socorro | LINEAR | HYG | 6.1 km | MPC · JPL |
| 53399 | 1999 JG_{112} | — | May 13, 1999 | Socorro | LINEAR | · | 4.7 km | MPC · JPL |
| 53400 | 1999 JB_{113} | — | May 13, 1999 | Socorro | LINEAR | EOS | 5.0 km | MPC · JPL |

== 53401–53500 ==
back to top

| Designation | | | Discovery | | | Properties | | Ref |
| Permanent | Provisional | Named after | Date | Site | Discoverer(s) | Category | Diam. | Ref |
|---|---|---|---|---|---|---|---|---|
| 53401 | 1999 JT_{115} | — | May 13, 1999 | Socorro | LINEAR | · | 10 km | MPC · JPL |
| 53402 | 1999 JG_{119} | — | May 13, 1999 | Socorro | LINEAR | (5651) | 17 km | MPC · JPL |
| 53403 | 1999 KM | — | May 16, 1999 | Catalina | CSS | · | 11 km | MPC · JPL |
| 53404 | 1999 KX | — | May 17, 1999 | Catalina | CSS | · | 4.5 km | MPC · JPL |
| 53405 | 1999 KX_{8} | — | May 18, 1999 | Socorro | LINEAR | · | 4.7 km | MPC · JPL |
| 53406 | 1999 KL_{12} | — | May 18, 1999 | Socorro | LINEAR | THM | 7.2 km | MPC · JPL |
| 53407 | 1999 KC_{17} | — | May 18, 1999 | Socorro | LINEAR | EOS | 5.8 km | MPC · JPL |
| 53408 | 1999 LU_{6} | — | June 7, 1999 | Kitt Peak | Spacewatch | · | 6.8 km | MPC · JPL |
| 53409 | 1999 LU_{7} | — | June 10, 1999 | Catalina | CSS | APO | 640 m | MPC · JPL |
| 53410 | 1999 LL_{28} | — | June 14, 1999 | Socorro | LINEAR | URS | 7.9 km | MPC · JPL |
| 53411 | 1999 LM_{32} | — | June 6, 1999 | Anderson Mesa | LONEOS | EUN | 4.4 km | MPC · JPL |
| 53412 | 1999 NQ_{1} | — | July 12, 1999 | Socorro | LINEAR | · | 11 km | MPC · JPL |
| 53413 | 1999 NE_{12} | — | July 13, 1999 | Socorro | LINEAR | · | 7.5 km | MPC · JPL |
| 53414 | 1999 NK_{19} | — | July 14, 1999 | Socorro | LINEAR | · | 8.6 km | MPC · JPL |
| 53415 | 1999 NC_{21} | — | July 14, 1999 | Socorro | LINEAR | EUP | 10 km | MPC · JPL |
| 53416 | 1999 NB_{23} | — | July 14, 1999 | Socorro | LINEAR | · | 8.1 km | MPC · JPL |
| 53417 | 1999 NP_{38} | — | July 14, 1999 | Socorro | LINEAR | H | 2.0 km | MPC · JPL |
| 53418 | 1999 PY_{3} | — | August 13, 1999 | Anderson Mesa | LONEOS | L5 | 25 km | MPC · JPL |
| 53419 | 1999 PJ_{4} | — | August 13, 1999 | Anderson Mesa | LONEOS | L5 | 22 km | MPC · JPL |
| 53420 | 1999 RH_{4} | — | September 5, 1999 | Catalina | CSS | EOS | 7.5 km | MPC · JPL |
| 53421 | 1999 RY_{18} | — | September 7, 1999 | Socorro | LINEAR | H | 1.5 km | MPC · JPL |
| 53422 | 1999 RN_{30} | — | September 8, 1999 | Socorro | LINEAR | H | 1.5 km | MPC · JPL |
| 53423 | 1999 RC_{238} | — | September 8, 1999 | Catalina | CSS | EOS | 6.4 km | MPC · JPL |
| 53424 | 1999 SC_{3} | — | September 24, 1999 | Socorro | LINEAR | H | 1.8 km | MPC · JPL |
| 53425 | 1999 SO_{4} | — | September 29, 1999 | Višnjan Observatory | K. Korlević | · | 3.9 km | MPC · JPL |
| 53426 | 1999 SL_{5} | — | September 28, 1999 | Socorro | LINEAR | APO +1km · PHA | 1.3 km | MPC · JPL |
| 53427 | 1999 SJ_{9} | — | September 29, 1999 | Socorro | LINEAR | H | 1.4 km | MPC · JPL |
| 53428 | 1999 TD_{2} | — | October 2, 1999 | Fountain Hills | C. W. Juels | H | 1.6 km | MPC · JPL |
| 53429 | 1999 TF_{5} | — | October 3, 1999 | Socorro | LINEAR | APO | 560 m | MPC · JPL |
| 53430 | 1999 TY_{16} | — | October 13, 1999 | Socorro | LINEAR | AMO +1km | 1.2 km | MPC · JPL |
| 53431 | 1999 UQ_{10} | — | October 31, 1999 | Socorro | LINEAR | H | 2.5 km | MPC · JPL |
| 53432 | 1999 UT_{55} | — | October 19, 1999 | Socorro | LINEAR | H · moon | 1.6 km | MPC · JPL |
| 53433 | 1999 VV_{10} | — | November 9, 1999 | Oizumi | T. Kobayashi | H | 2.1 km | MPC · JPL |
| 53434 | 1999 VD_{25} | — | November 13, 1999 | Oizumi | T. Kobayashi | · | 5.9 km | MPC · JPL |
| 53435 Leonard | 1999 VM_{40} | Leonard | November 9, 1999 | Catalina | CSS | AMO +1km | 4.0 km | MPC · JPL |
| 53436 | 1999 VB_{154} | — | November 13, 1999 | Catalina | CSS | L4 | 28 km | MPC · JPL |
| 53437 | 1999 WL_{2} | — | November 26, 1999 | Višnjan Observatory | K. Korlević | · | 2.3 km | MPC · JPL |
| 53438 | 1999 WY_{9} | — | November 30, 1999 | Oizumi | T. Kobayashi | H | 2.1 km | MPC · JPL |
| 53439 | 1999 WA_{10} | — | November 30, 1999 | Oizumi | T. Kobayashi | PHO | 4.4 km | MPC · JPL |
| 53440 | 1999 XQ_{33} | — | December 6, 1999 | Socorro | LINEAR | H | 1.7 km | MPC · JPL |
| 53441 | 1999 XL_{77} | — | December 7, 1999 | Socorro | LINEAR | · | 1.5 km | MPC · JPL |
| 53442 | 1999 XU_{81} | — | December 7, 1999 | Socorro | LINEAR | · | 2.2 km | MPC · JPL |
| 53443 | 1999 XX_{81} | — | December 7, 1999 | Socorro | LINEAR | · | 2.6 km | MPC · JPL |
| 53444 | 1999 XV_{90} | — | December 7, 1999 | Socorro | LINEAR | · | 2.2 km | MPC · JPL |
| 53445 | 1999 XB_{103} | — | December 7, 1999 | Socorro | LINEAR | PHO | 7.0 km | MPC · JPL |
| 53446 | 1999 XD_{103} | — | December 7, 1999 | Socorro | LINEAR | V | 1.9 km | MPC · JPL |
| 53447 | 1999 XL_{105} | — | December 8, 1999 | Nachi-Katsuura | Y. Shimizu, T. Urata | · | 1.9 km | MPC · JPL |
| 53448 | 1999 XT_{105} | — | December 11, 1999 | Oizumi | T. Kobayashi | · | 2.3 km | MPC · JPL |
| 53449 | 1999 XG_{132} | — | December 12, 1999 | Socorro | LINEAR | L4 | 20 km | MPC · JPL |
| 53450 | 1999 XX_{132} | — | December 12, 1999 | Socorro | LINEAR | · | 2.2 km | MPC · JPL |
| 53451 | 1999 XU_{134} | — | December 5, 1999 | Socorro | LINEAR | H | 1.7 km | MPC · JPL |
| 53452 | 1999 XW_{134} | — | December 5, 1999 | Socorro | LINEAR | H | 1.5 km | MPC · JPL |
| 53453 | 1999 XX_{135} | — | December 12, 1999 | Socorro | LINEAR | H | 2.2 km | MPC · JPL |
| 53454 | 1999 XC_{136} | — | December 13, 1999 | Socorro | LINEAR | H | 4.7 km | MPC · JPL |
| 53455 | 1999 XX_{139} | — | December 2, 1999 | Kitt Peak | Spacewatch | V | 1.7 km | MPC · JPL |
| 53456 | 1999 XR_{142} | — | December 12, 1999 | Socorro | LINEAR | H | 2.0 km | MPC · JPL |
| 53457 | 1999 XX_{142} | — | December 14, 1999 | Socorro | LINEAR | H | 1.6 km | MPC · JPL |
| 53458 | 1999 XH_{153} | — | December 7, 1999 | Socorro | LINEAR | · | 1.5 km | MPC · JPL |
| 53459 | 1999 XD_{156} | — | December 8, 1999 | Socorro | LINEAR | · | 2.2 km | MPC · JPL |
| 53460 | 1999 XG_{174} | — | December 10, 1999 | Socorro | LINEAR | · | 2.6 km | MPC · JPL |
| 53461 | 1999 XS_{177} | — | December 10, 1999 | Socorro | LINEAR | · | 1.5 km | MPC · JPL |
| 53462 | 1999 XR_{178} | — | December 10, 1999 | Socorro | LINEAR | · | 1.8 km | MPC · JPL |
| 53463 | 1999 XW_{196} | — | December 12, 1999 | Socorro | LINEAR | · | 1.9 km | MPC · JPL |
| 53464 | 1999 XG_{205} | — | December 12, 1999 | Socorro | LINEAR | · | 7.9 km | MPC · JPL |
| 53465 | 1999 XY_{222} | — | December 15, 1999 | Socorro | LINEAR | · | 2.0 km | MPC · JPL |
| 53466 | 1999 XS_{230} | — | December 7, 1999 | Anderson Mesa | LONEOS | · | 5.1 km | MPC · JPL |
| 53467 | 2000 AD_{1} | — | January 2, 2000 | Kitt Peak | Spacewatch | V | 1.7 km | MPC · JPL |
| 53468 Varros | 2000 AC_{2} | Varros | January 2, 2000 | Gnosca | S. Sposetti | · | 1.7 km | MPC · JPL |
| 53469 | 2000 AX_{8} | — | January 2, 2000 | Socorro | LINEAR | L4 · ERY | 18 km | MPC · JPL |
| 53470 | 2000 AG_{16} | — | January 3, 2000 | Socorro | LINEAR | · | 3.8 km | MPC · JPL |
| 53471 | 2000 AU_{30} | — | January 3, 2000 | Socorro | LINEAR | · | 4.8 km | MPC · JPL |
| 53472 | 2000 AE_{33} | — | January 3, 2000 | Socorro | LINEAR | · | 3.3 km | MPC · JPL |
| 53473 | 2000 AN_{39} | — | January 3, 2000 | Socorro | LINEAR | · | 2.6 km | MPC · JPL |
| 53474 | 2000 AC_{40} | — | January 3, 2000 | Socorro | LINEAR | · | 2.5 km | MPC · JPL |
| 53475 | 2000 AH_{49} | — | January 5, 2000 | Socorro | LINEAR | · | 1.6 km | MPC · JPL |
| 53476 | 2000 AQ_{49} | — | January 5, 2000 | Socorro | LINEAR | · | 1.7 km | MPC · JPL |
| 53477 | 2000 AA_{54} | — | January 4, 2000 | Socorro | LINEAR | L4 | 20 km | MPC · JPL |
| 53478 | 2000 AK_{54} | — | January 4, 2000 | Socorro | LINEAR | PHO | 4.3 km | MPC · JPL |
| 53479 | 2000 AG_{56} | — | January 4, 2000 | Socorro | LINEAR | · | 2.1 km | MPC · JPL |
| 53480 | 2000 AM_{56} | — | January 4, 2000 | Socorro | LINEAR | fast | 2.8 km | MPC · JPL |
| 53481 | 2000 AC_{57} | — | January 4, 2000 | Socorro | LINEAR | · | 1.8 km | MPC · JPL |
| 53482 | 2000 AQ_{57} | — | January 4, 2000 | Socorro | LINEAR | · | 2.5 km | MPC · JPL |
| 53483 | 2000 AC_{58} | — | January 4, 2000 | Socorro | LINEAR | · | 4.4 km | MPC · JPL |
| 53484 | 2000 AT_{58} | — | January 4, 2000 | Socorro | LINEAR | · | 2.7 km | MPC · JPL |
| 53485 | 2000 AU_{58} | — | January 4, 2000 | Socorro | LINEAR | NYS | 3.1 km | MPC · JPL |
| 53486 | 2000 AJ_{59} | — | January 4, 2000 | Socorro | LINEAR | · | 7.1 km | MPC · JPL |
| 53487 | 2000 AQ_{59} | — | January 4, 2000 | Socorro | LINEAR | · | 2.9 km | MPC · JPL |
| 53488 | 2000 AG_{61} | — | January 4, 2000 | Socorro | LINEAR | · | 5.8 km | MPC · JPL |
| 53489 | 2000 AJ_{62} | — | January 4, 2000 | Socorro | LINEAR | (2076) | 3.2 km | MPC · JPL |
| 53490 | 2000 AZ_{65} | — | January 4, 2000 | Socorro | LINEAR | fast | 2.3 km | MPC · JPL |
| 53491 | 2000 AM_{66} | — | January 4, 2000 | Socorro | LINEAR | V · fast | 1.9 km | MPC · JPL |
| 53492 | 2000 AK_{67} | — | January 4, 2000 | Socorro | LINEAR | EUN | 3.9 km | MPC · JPL |
| 53493 | 2000 AP_{67} | — | January 4, 2000 | Socorro | LINEAR | · | 3.0 km | MPC · JPL |
| 53494 | 2000 AP_{68} | — | January 5, 2000 | Socorro | LINEAR | · | 10 km | MPC · JPL |
| 53495 | 2000 AW_{69} | — | January 5, 2000 | Socorro | LINEAR | · | 8.7 km | MPC · JPL |
| 53496 | 2000 AH_{74} | — | January 5, 2000 | Socorro | LINEAR | · | 3.6 km | MPC · JPL |
| 53497 | 2000 AV_{76} | — | January 5, 2000 | Socorro | LINEAR | · | 1.9 km | MPC · JPL |
| 53498 | 2000 AV_{86} | — | January 5, 2000 | Socorro | LINEAR | · | 1.7 km | MPC · JPL |
| 53499 | 2000 AT_{87} | — | January 5, 2000 | Socorro | LINEAR | · | 2.1 km | MPC · JPL |
| 53500 | 2000 AQ_{88} | — | January 5, 2000 | Socorro | LINEAR | · | 3.5 km | MPC · JPL |

== 53501–53600 ==
back to top

| Designation | | | Discovery | | | Properties | | Ref |
| Permanent | Provisional | Named after | Date | Site | Discoverer(s) | Category | Diam. | Ref |
|---|---|---|---|---|---|---|---|---|
| 53501 | 2000 AC_{95} | — | January 4, 2000 | Socorro | LINEAR | · | 2.7 km | MPC · JPL |
| 53502 | 2000 AG_{97} | — | January 4, 2000 | Socorro | LINEAR | · | 5.5 km | MPC · JPL |
| 53503 | 2000 AH_{98} | — | January 4, 2000 | Socorro | LINEAR | · | 4.8 km | MPC · JPL |
| 53504 | 2000 AN_{98} | — | January 4, 2000 | Socorro | LINEAR | V | 2.4 km | MPC · JPL |
| 53505 | 2000 AL_{112} | — | January 5, 2000 | Socorro | LINEAR | · | 3.0 km | MPC · JPL |
| 53506 | 2000 AU_{119} | — | January 5, 2000 | Socorro | LINEAR | V | 1.5 km | MPC · JPL |
| 53507 | 2000 AX_{120} | — | January 5, 2000 | Socorro | LINEAR | V | 2.2 km | MPC · JPL |
| 53508 | 2000 AO_{122} | — | January 5, 2000 | Socorro | LINEAR | · | 1.9 km | MPC · JPL |
| 53509 | 2000 AT_{122} | — | January 5, 2000 | Socorro | LINEAR | · | 2.1 km | MPC · JPL |
| 53510 | 2000 AJ_{126} | — | January 5, 2000 | Socorro | LINEAR | EUN | 2.7 km | MPC · JPL |
| 53511 | 2000 AV_{126} | — | January 5, 2000 | Socorro | LINEAR | · | 2.9 km | MPC · JPL |
| 53512 | 2000 AZ_{127} | — | January 5, 2000 | Socorro | LINEAR | · | 10 km | MPC · JPL |
| 53513 | 2000 AB_{136} | — | January 4, 2000 | Socorro | LINEAR | · | 7.8 km | MPC · JPL |
| 53514 | 2000 AS_{136} | — | January 4, 2000 | Socorro | LINEAR | · | 2.0 km | MPC · JPL |
| 53515 | 2000 AT_{136} | — | January 4, 2000 | Socorro | LINEAR | · | 3.6 km | MPC · JPL |
| 53516 | 2000 AV_{136} | — | January 4, 2000 | Socorro | LINEAR | · | 6.3 km | MPC · JPL |
| 53517 | 2000 AK_{137} | — | January 4, 2000 | Socorro | LINEAR | · | 7.4 km | MPC · JPL |
| 53518 | 2000 AR_{137} | — | January 4, 2000 | Socorro | LINEAR | · | 3.6 km | MPC · JPL |
| 53519 | 2000 AQ_{142} | — | January 5, 2000 | Socorro | LINEAR | · | 3.4 km | MPC · JPL |
| 53520 | 2000 AQ_{144} | — | January 5, 2000 | Socorro | LINEAR | slow | 2.4 km | MPC · JPL |
| 53521 | 2000 AZ_{144} | — | January 5, 2000 | Socorro | LINEAR | · | 4.0 km | MPC · JPL |
| 53522 | 2000 AE_{146} | — | January 7, 2000 | Socorro | LINEAR | H | 1.2 km | MPC · JPL |
| 53523 | 2000 AC_{153} | — | January 8, 2000 | Socorro | LINEAR | fast? | 2.6 km | MPC · JPL |
| 53524 | 2000 AN_{153} | — | January 13, 2000 | Kitt Peak | Spacewatch | V | 1.5 km | MPC · JPL |
| 53525 | 2000 AN_{161} | — | January 3, 2000 | Socorro | LINEAR | · | 2.7 km | MPC · JPL |
| 53526 | 2000 AJ_{162} | — | January 4, 2000 | Socorro | LINEAR | · | 1.7 km | MPC · JPL |
| 53527 | 2000 AM_{164} | — | January 5, 2000 | Socorro | LINEAR | HNS | 4.5 km | MPC · JPL |
| 53528 | 2000 AW_{177} | — | January 7, 2000 | Socorro | LINEAR | EUN | 4.2 km | MPC · JPL |
| 53529 | 2000 AN_{198} | — | January 8, 2000 | Socorro | LINEAR | · | 3.1 km | MPC · JPL |
| 53530 | 2000 AV_{200} | — | January 9, 2000 | Socorro | LINEAR | H | 2.1 km | MPC · JPL |
| 53531 | 2000 AD_{212} | — | January 5, 2000 | Kitt Peak | Spacewatch | · | 2.9 km | MPC · JPL |
| 53532 | 2000 AJ_{212} | — | January 5, 2000 | Kitt Peak | Spacewatch | · | 1.9 km | MPC · JPL |
| 53533 | 2000 AA_{216} | — | January 7, 2000 | Kitt Peak | Spacewatch | · | 3.9 km | MPC · JPL |
| 53534 | 2000 AM_{233} | — | January 4, 2000 | Socorro | LINEAR | NYS | 3.6 km | MPC · JPL |
| 53535 | 2000 AH_{237} | — | January 5, 2000 | Socorro | LINEAR | · | 4.4 km | MPC · JPL |
| 53536 | 2000 AE_{239} | — | January 6, 2000 | Socorro | LINEAR | · | 2.4 km | MPC · JPL |
| 53537 Zhangyun | 2000 AZ_{239} | Zhangyun | January 6, 2000 | Anderson Mesa | LONEOS | SUL | 8.1 km | MPC · JPL |
| 53538 | 2000 AE_{240} | — | January 6, 2000 | Anderson Mesa | LONEOS | · | 2.5 km | MPC · JPL |
| 53539 | 2000 AO_{243} | — | January 7, 2000 | Socorro | LINEAR | · | 1.4 km | MPC · JPL |
| 53540 | 2000 AE_{252} | — | January 6, 2000 | Socorro | LINEAR | · | 2.3 km | MPC · JPL |
| 53541 | 2000 AK_{252} | — | January 7, 2000 | Kitt Peak | Spacewatch | PHO | 2.2 km | MPC · JPL |
| 53542 | 2000 BE_{1} | — | January 28, 2000 | Socorro | LINEAR | · | 2.5 km | MPC · JPL |
| 53543 | 2000 BD_{3} | — | January 26, 2000 | Višnjan Observatory | K. Korlević | NYS | 3.1 km | MPC · JPL |
| 53544 | 2000 BF_{3} | — | January 27, 2000 | Višnjan Observatory | K. Korlević | NYS | 3.8 km | MPC · JPL |
| 53545 | 2000 BT_{5} | — | January 27, 2000 | Socorro | LINEAR | · | 2.8 km | MPC · JPL |
| 53546 | 2000 BY_{6} | — | January 27, 2000 | Socorro | LINEAR | 526 | 6.9 km | MPC · JPL |
| 53547 | 2000 BF_{8} | — | January 29, 2000 | Socorro | LINEAR | V | 1.7 km | MPC · JPL |
| 53548 | 2000 BA_{14} | — | January 28, 2000 | Uenohara | N. Kawasato | · | 3.0 km | MPC · JPL |
| 53549 | 2000 BN_{14} | — | January 28, 2000 | Oizumi | T. Kobayashi | · | 6.6 km | MPC · JPL |
| 53550 | 2000 BF_{19} | — | January 28, 2000 | Kitt Peak | Spacewatch | APO · PHA | 550 m | MPC · JPL |
| 53551 | 2000 BP_{28} | — | January 29, 2000 | Socorro | LINEAR | · | 1.4 km | MPC · JPL |
| 53552 | 2000 BC_{33} | — | January 29, 2000 | Kitt Peak | Spacewatch | · | 1.8 km | MPC · JPL |
| 53553 | 2000 CB_{2} | — | February 2, 2000 | Oizumi | T. Kobayashi | · | 2.6 km | MPC · JPL |
| 53554 | 2000 CH_{2} | — | February 2, 2000 | Gekko | T. Kagawa | · | 3.0 km | MPC · JPL |
| 53555 | 2000 CG_{5} | — | February 2, 2000 | Socorro | LINEAR | · | 2.6 km | MPC · JPL |
| 53556 | 2000 CW_{8} | — | February 2, 2000 | Socorro | LINEAR | · | 2.8 km | MPC · JPL |
| 53557 | 2000 CT_{14} | — | February 2, 2000 | Socorro | LINEAR | · | 2.8 km | MPC · JPL |
| 53558 | 2000 CR_{17} | — | February 2, 2000 | Socorro | LINEAR | NYS · | 3.0 km | MPC · JPL |
| 53559 | 2000 CJ_{21} | — | February 2, 2000 | Socorro | LINEAR | · | 1.6 km | MPC · JPL |
| 53560 | 2000 CT_{21} | — | February 2, 2000 | Socorro | LINEAR | · | 1.5 km | MPC · JPL |
| 53561 | 2000 CM_{22} | — | February 2, 2000 | Socorro | LINEAR | · | 2.3 km | MPC · JPL |
| 53562 | 2000 CL_{25} | — | February 2, 2000 | Socorro | LINEAR | V | 2.1 km | MPC · JPL |
| 53563 | 2000 CJ_{29} | — | February 2, 2000 | Socorro | LINEAR | · | 2.1 km | MPC · JPL |
| 53564 | 2000 CR_{29} | — | February 2, 2000 | Socorro | LINEAR | · | 2.2 km | MPC · JPL |
| 53565 | 2000 CG_{30} | — | February 2, 2000 | Socorro | LINEAR | MAS | 1.8 km | MPC · JPL |
| 53566 | 2000 CU_{30} | — | February 2, 2000 | Socorro | LINEAR | · | 2.4 km | MPC · JPL |
| 53567 | 2000 CB_{33} | — | February 2, 2000 | Socorro | LINEAR | · | 2.6 km | MPC · JPL |
| 53568 | 2000 CB_{34} | — | February 4, 2000 | Višnjan Observatory | K. Korlević | EUN | 2.6 km | MPC · JPL |
| 53569 | 2000 CF_{36} | — | February 2, 2000 | Socorro | LINEAR | · | 3.6 km | MPC · JPL |
| 53570 | 2000 CR_{36} | — | February 2, 2000 | Socorro | LINEAR | · | 4.8 km | MPC · JPL |
| 53571 | 2000 CY_{36} | — | February 2, 2000 | Socorro | LINEAR | · | 2.6 km | MPC · JPL |
| 53572 | 2000 CM_{38} | — | February 3, 2000 | Socorro | LINEAR | · | 1.8 km | MPC · JPL |
| 53573 | 2000 CW_{38} | — | February 3, 2000 | Socorro | LINEAR | · | 5.3 km | MPC · JPL |
| 53574 | 2000 CH_{41} | — | February 7, 2000 | Prescott | P. G. Comba | · | 1.8 km | MPC · JPL |
| 53575 | 2000 CN_{43} | — | February 2, 2000 | Socorro | LINEAR | · | 4.2 km | MPC · JPL |
| 53576 | 2000 CS_{47} | — | February 2, 2000 | Socorro | LINEAR | · | 1.9 km | MPC · JPL |
| 53577 | 2000 CT_{47} | — | February 2, 2000 | Socorro | LINEAR | · | 4.2 km | MPC · JPL |
| 53578 | 2000 CM_{48} | — | February 2, 2000 | Socorro | LINEAR | · | 2.8 km | MPC · JPL |
| 53579 | 2000 CN_{48} | — | February 2, 2000 | Socorro | LINEAR | · | 1.7 km | MPC · JPL |
| 53580 | 2000 CR_{48} | — | February 2, 2000 | Socorro | LINEAR | V | 2.0 km | MPC · JPL |
| 53581 | 2000 CY_{49} | — | February 2, 2000 | Socorro | LINEAR | · | 2.6 km | MPC · JPL |
| 53582 | 2000 CZ_{49} | — | February 2, 2000 | Socorro | LINEAR | V | 1.7 km | MPC · JPL |
| 53583 | 2000 CR_{50} | — | February 2, 2000 | Socorro | LINEAR | · | 2.5 km | MPC · JPL |
| 53584 | 2000 CY_{51} | — | February 2, 2000 | Socorro | LINEAR | · | 2.9 km | MPC · JPL |
| 53585 | 2000 CF_{52} | — | February 2, 2000 | Socorro | LINEAR | · | 4.4 km | MPC · JPL |
| 53586 | 2000 CA_{53} | — | February 2, 2000 | Socorro | LINEAR | · | 2.2 km | MPC · JPL |
| 53587 | 2000 CD_{53} | — | February 2, 2000 | Socorro | LINEAR | · | 3.7 km | MPC · JPL |
| 53588 | 2000 CH_{53} | — | February 2, 2000 | Socorro | LINEAR | · | 4.9 km | MPC · JPL |
| 53589 | 2000 CQ_{53} | — | February 2, 2000 | Socorro | LINEAR | · | 2.8 km | MPC · JPL |
| 53590 | 2000 CL_{54} | — | February 2, 2000 | Socorro | LINEAR | V | 2.0 km | MPC · JPL |
| 53591 | 2000 CY_{55} | — | February 4, 2000 | Socorro | LINEAR | · | 3.3 km | MPC · JPL |
| 53592 | 2000 CH_{56} | — | February 4, 2000 | Socorro | LINEAR | · | 1.9 km | MPC · JPL |
| 53593 | 2000 CJ_{58} | — | February 5, 2000 | Socorro | LINEAR | · | 2.9 km | MPC · JPL |
| 53594 | 2000 CJ_{62} | — | February 2, 2000 | Socorro | LINEAR | · | 2.1 km | MPC · JPL |
| 53595 | 2000 CK_{62} | — | February 2, 2000 | Socorro | LINEAR | · | 1.9 km | MPC · JPL |
| 53596 | 2000 CD_{63} | — | February 2, 2000 | Socorro | LINEAR | · | 2.5 km | MPC · JPL |
| 53597 | 2000 CX_{63} | — | February 2, 2000 | Socorro | LINEAR | · | 2.5 km | MPC · JPL |
| 53598 | 2000 CF_{70} | — | February 6, 2000 | Socorro | LINEAR | · | 2.5 km | MPC · JPL |
| 53599 | 2000 CZ_{70} | — | February 7, 2000 | Socorro | LINEAR | · | 3.9 km | MPC · JPL |
| 53600 | 2000 CA_{71} | — | February 7, 2000 | Socorro | LINEAR | · | 2.3 km | MPC · JPL |

== 53601–53700 ==
back to top

| Designation | | | Discovery | | | Properties | | Ref |
| Permanent | Provisional | Named after | Date | Site | Discoverer(s) | Category | Diam. | Ref |
|---|---|---|---|---|---|---|---|---|
| 53601 | 2000 CK_{72} | — | February 4, 2000 | Višnjan Observatory | K. Korlević | · | 1.5 km | MPC · JPL |
| 53602 | 2000 CL_{72} | — | February 6, 2000 | Višnjan Observatory | K. Korlević | · | 3.0 km | MPC · JPL |
| 53603 | 2000 CF_{75} | — | February 3, 2000 | Socorro | LINEAR | · | 2.1 km | MPC · JPL |
| 53604 | 2000 CJ_{75} | — | February 4, 2000 | Socorro | LINEAR | · | 2.2 km | MPC · JPL |
| 53605 | 2000 CY_{76} | — | February 10, 2000 | Višnjan Observatory | K. Korlević | · | 5.0 km | MPC · JPL |
| 53606 | 2000 CN_{81} | — | February 4, 2000 | Socorro | LINEAR | · | 1.9 km | MPC · JPL |
| 53607 | 2000 CV_{81} | — | February 4, 2000 | Socorro | LINEAR | · | 1.8 km | MPC · JPL |
| 53608 | 2000 CC_{82} | — | February 4, 2000 | Socorro | LINEAR | · | 3.8 km | MPC · JPL |
| 53609 | 2000 CE_{82} | — | February 4, 2000 | Socorro | LINEAR | · | 2.6 km | MPC · JPL |
| 53610 | 2000 CM_{82} | — | February 4, 2000 | Socorro | LINEAR | · | 4.3 km | MPC · JPL |
| 53611 | 2000 CQ_{82} | — | February 4, 2000 | Socorro | LINEAR | · | 1.8 km | MPC · JPL |
| 53612 | 2000 CD_{85} | — | February 4, 2000 | Socorro | LINEAR | · | 2.5 km | MPC · JPL |
| 53613 | 2000 CP_{85} | — | February 4, 2000 | Socorro | LINEAR | · | 2.0 km | MPC · JPL |
| 53614 | 2000 CC_{86} | — | February 4, 2000 | Socorro | LINEAR | · | 2.1 km | MPC · JPL |
| 53615 | 2000 CF_{86} | — | February 4, 2000 | Socorro | LINEAR | NYS | 3.8 km | MPC · JPL |
| 53616 | 2000 CS_{86} | — | February 4, 2000 | Socorro | LINEAR | · | 1.5 km | MPC · JPL |
| 53617 | 2000 CX_{88} | — | February 4, 2000 | Socorro | LINEAR | · | 2.4 km | MPC · JPL |
| 53618 | 2000 CJ_{92} | — | February 6, 2000 | Socorro | LINEAR | · | 3.1 km | MPC · JPL |
| 53619 | 2000 CC_{93} | — | February 6, 2000 | Socorro | LINEAR | PHO | 3.6 km | MPC · JPL |
| 53620 | 2000 CN_{93} | — | February 6, 2000 | Socorro | LINEAR | · | 3.1 km | MPC · JPL |
| 53621 | 2000 CO_{93} | — | February 6, 2000 | Socorro | LINEAR | · | 2.1 km | MPC · JPL |
| 53622 | 2000 CS_{93} | — | February 8, 2000 | Socorro | LINEAR | · | 6.3 km | MPC · JPL |
| 53623 | 2000 CT_{93} | — | February 8, 2000 | Socorro | LINEAR | NYS | 2.9 km | MPC · JPL |
| 53624 | 2000 CT_{95} | — | February 8, 2000 | Kitt Peak | Spacewatch | (5) | 2.2 km | MPC · JPL |
| 53625 | 2000 CZ_{96} | — | February 8, 2000 | Socorro | LINEAR | slow | 2.1 km | MPC · JPL |
| 53626 | 2000 CE_{97} | — | February 11, 2000 | Višnjan Observatory | K. Korlević | · | 1.5 km | MPC · JPL |
| 53627 | 2000 CN_{98} | — | February 8, 2000 | Kitt Peak | Spacewatch | · | 3.4 km | MPC · JPL |
| 53628 | 2000 CW_{101} | — | February 3, 2000 | Uccle | T. Pauwels | · | 3.0 km | MPC · JPL |
| 53629 Andrewpotter | 2000 CJ_{112} | Andrewpotter | February 7, 2000 | Catalina | CSS | · | 2.2 km | MPC · JPL |
| 53630 | 2000 CW_{116} | — | February 3, 2000 | Socorro | LINEAR | · | 2.3 km | MPC · JPL |
| 53631 | 2000 CD_{119} | — | February 6, 2000 | Socorro | LINEAR | · | 3.0 km | MPC · JPL |
| 53632 | 2000 CP_{123} | — | February 3, 2000 | Socorro | LINEAR | · | 3.2 km | MPC · JPL |
| 53633 | 2000 DQ | — | February 24, 2000 | Oizumi | T. Kobayashi | · | 3.9 km | MPC · JPL |
| 53634 | 2000 DF_{1} | — | February 26, 2000 | Rock Finder | W. K. Y. Yeung | (2076) | 3.3 km | MPC · JPL |
| 53635 | 2000 DZ_{3} | — | February 28, 2000 | Socorro | LINEAR | · | 2.4 km | MPC · JPL |
| 53636 | 2000 DD_{11} | — | February 26, 2000 | Kitt Peak | Spacewatch | NYS | 2.2 km | MPC · JPL |
| 53637 | 2000 DO_{11} | — | February 27, 2000 | Kitt Peak | Spacewatch | · | 1.3 km | MPC · JPL |
| 53638 | 2000 DD_{13} | — | February 27, 2000 | Kitt Peak | Spacewatch | · | 3.2 km | MPC · JPL |
| 53639 | 2000 DJ_{13} | — | February 28, 2000 | Kitt Peak | Spacewatch | · | 3.4 km | MPC · JPL |
| 53640 Marché | 2000 DT_{14} | Marché | February 26, 2000 | Catalina | CSS | · | 2.0 km | MPC · JPL |
| 53641 | 2000 DD_{16} | — | February 28, 2000 | Višnjan Observatory | K. Korlević | · | 3.1 km | MPC · JPL |
| 53642 | 2000 DH_{18} | — | February 28, 2000 | Socorro | LINEAR | · | 2.5 km | MPC · JPL |
| 53643 | 2000 DL_{18} | — | February 28, 2000 | Socorro | LINEAR | · | 2.9 km | MPC · JPL |
| 53644 | 2000 DS_{22} | — | February 29, 2000 | Socorro | LINEAR | · | 2.0 km | MPC · JPL |
| 53645 | 2000 DY_{22} | — | February 29, 2000 | Socorro | LINEAR | · | 2.3 km | MPC · JPL |
| 53646 | 2000 DS_{23} | — | February 29, 2000 | Socorro | LINEAR | · | 2.1 km | MPC · JPL |
| 53647 | 2000 DE_{26} | — | February 29, 2000 | Socorro | LINEAR | NYS | 3.3 km | MPC · JPL |
| 53648 | 2000 DF_{28} | — | February 29, 2000 | Socorro | LINEAR | · | 1.6 km | MPC · JPL |
| 53649 | 2000 DH_{40} | — | February 29, 2000 | Socorro | LINEAR | · | 2.4 km | MPC · JPL |
| 53650 | 2000 DD_{41} | — | February 29, 2000 | Socorro | LINEAR | V | 1.9 km | MPC · JPL |
| 53651 | 2000 DX_{42} | — | February 29, 2000 | Socorro | LINEAR | · | 2.4 km | MPC · JPL |
| 53652 | 2000 DZ_{42} | — | February 29, 2000 | Socorro | LINEAR | · | 1.6 km | MPC · JPL |
| 53653 | 2000 DG_{43} | — | February 29, 2000 | Socorro | LINEAR | NYS | 3.7 km | MPC · JPL |
| 53654 | 2000 DD_{51} | — | February 29, 2000 | Socorro | LINEAR | · | 3.8 km | MPC · JPL |
| 53655 | 2000 DC_{52} | — | February 29, 2000 | Socorro | LINEAR | · | 6.1 km | MPC · JPL |
| 53656 | 2000 DV_{52} | — | February 29, 2000 | Socorro | LINEAR | · | 2.7 km | MPC · JPL |
| 53657 | 2000 DG_{53} | — | February 29, 2000 | Socorro | LINEAR | · | 1.5 km | MPC · JPL |
| 53658 | 2000 DQ_{56} | — | February 29, 2000 | Socorro | LINEAR | · | 3.1 km | MPC · JPL |
| 53659 | 2000 DP_{57} | — | February 29, 2000 | Socorro | LINEAR | · | 4.3 km | MPC · JPL |
| 53660 | 2000 DT_{61} | — | February 29, 2000 | Socorro | LINEAR | · | 3.1 km | MPC · JPL |
| 53661 | 2000 DU_{62} | — | February 29, 2000 | Socorro | LINEAR | · | 3.5 km | MPC · JPL |
| 53662 | 2000 DV_{62} | — | February 29, 2000 | Socorro | LINEAR | · | 2.3 km | MPC · JPL |
| 53663 | 2000 DX_{63} | — | February 29, 2000 | Socorro | LINEAR | · | 2.1 km | MPC · JPL |
| 53664 | 2000 DJ_{64} | — | February 29, 2000 | Socorro | LINEAR | · | 1.9 km | MPC · JPL |
| 53665 | 2000 DV_{68} | — | February 29, 2000 | Socorro | LINEAR | · | 2.7 km | MPC · JPL |
| 53666 | 2000 DK_{70} | — | February 29, 2000 | Socorro | LINEAR | (2076) | 2.0 km | MPC · JPL |
| 53667 | 2000 DT_{70} | — | February 29, 2000 | Socorro | LINEAR | · | 1.6 km | MPC · JPL |
| 53668 | 2000 DY_{70} | — | February 29, 2000 | Socorro | LINEAR | · | 5.5 km | MPC · JPL |
| 53669 | 2000 DD_{71} | — | February 29, 2000 | Socorro | LINEAR | · | 1.6 km | MPC · JPL |
| 53670 | 2000 DJ_{71} | — | February 29, 2000 | Socorro | LINEAR | · | 1.3 km | MPC · JPL |
| 53671 | 2000 DO_{71} | — | February 29, 2000 | Socorro | LINEAR | · | 5.6 km | MPC · JPL |
| 53672 | 2000 DS_{71} | — | February 29, 2000 | Socorro | LINEAR | · | 2.4 km | MPC · JPL |
| 53673 | 2000 DT_{71} | — | February 29, 2000 | Socorro | LINEAR | NYS | 2.3 km | MPC · JPL |
| 53674 | 2000 DU_{71} | — | February 29, 2000 | Socorro | LINEAR | · | 2.6 km | MPC · JPL |
| 53675 | 2000 DC_{73} | — | February 29, 2000 | Socorro | LINEAR | · | 2.6 km | MPC · JPL |
| 53676 | 2000 DU_{73} | — | February 29, 2000 | Socorro | LINEAR | · | 1.8 km | MPC · JPL |
| 53677 | 2000 DE_{75} | — | February 29, 2000 | Socorro | LINEAR | NYS | 2.1 km | MPC · JPL |
| 53678 | 2000 DQ_{75} | — | February 29, 2000 | Socorro | LINEAR | · | 2.8 km | MPC · JPL |
| 53679 | 2000 DZ_{75} | — | February 29, 2000 | Socorro | LINEAR | · | 1.4 km | MPC · JPL |
| 53680 | 2000 DA_{76} | — | February 29, 2000 | Socorro | LINEAR | V | 1.2 km | MPC · JPL |
| 53681 | 2000 DE_{76} | — | February 29, 2000 | Socorro | LINEAR | · | 4.7 km | MPC · JPL |
| 53682 | 2000 DO_{77} | — | February 29, 2000 | Socorro | LINEAR | · | 3.5 km | MPC · JPL |
| 53683 | 2000 DR_{77} | — | February 29, 2000 | Socorro | LINEAR | · | 4.6 km | MPC · JPL |
| 53684 | 2000 DA_{78} | — | February 29, 2000 | Socorro | LINEAR | · | 3.0 km | MPC · JPL |
| 53685 | 2000 DX_{78} | — | February 29, 2000 | Socorro | LINEAR | NYS | 2.5 km | MPC · JPL |
| 53686 | 2000 DV_{79} | — | February 28, 2000 | Socorro | LINEAR | · | 2.0 km | MPC · JPL |
| 53687 | 2000 DP_{80} | — | February 28, 2000 | Socorro | LINEAR | · | 2.3 km | MPC · JPL |
| 53688 | 2000 DV_{80} | — | February 28, 2000 | Socorro | LINEAR | · | 2.3 km | MPC · JPL |
| 53689 | 2000 DO_{81} | — | February 28, 2000 | Socorro | LINEAR | · | 2.5 km | MPC · JPL |
| 53690 | 2000 DK_{83} | — | February 28, 2000 | Socorro | LINEAR | · | 2.8 km | MPC · JPL |
| 53691 | 2000 DM_{83} | — | February 28, 2000 | Socorro | LINEAR | slow | 2.4 km | MPC · JPL |
| 53692 | 2000 DQ_{84} | — | February 29, 2000 | Socorro | LINEAR | · | 3.4 km | MPC · JPL |
| 53693 | 2000 DC_{85} | — | February 29, 2000 | Socorro | LINEAR | · | 2.3 km | MPC · JPL |
| 53694 | 2000 DV_{85} | — | February 29, 2000 | Socorro | LINEAR | · | 3.5 km | MPC · JPL |
| 53695 | 2000 DJ_{86} | — | February 29, 2000 | Socorro | LINEAR | · | 2.6 km | MPC · JPL |
| 53696 | 2000 DS_{86} | — | February 29, 2000 | Socorro | LINEAR | · | 3.8 km | MPC · JPL |
| 53697 | 2000 DX_{86} | — | February 29, 2000 | Socorro | LINEAR | · | 2.1 km | MPC · JPL |
| 53698 | 2000 DW_{93} | — | February 28, 2000 | Socorro | LINEAR | · | 2.7 km | MPC · JPL |
| 53699 | 2000 DB_{94} | — | February 28, 2000 | Socorro | LINEAR | NYS | 2.9 km | MPC · JPL |
| 53700 | 2000 DU_{94} | — | February 28, 2000 | Socorro | LINEAR | · | 1.6 km | MPC · JPL |

== 53701–53800 ==
back to top

| Designation | | | Discovery | | | Properties | | Ref |
| Permanent | Provisional | Named after | Date | Site | Discoverer(s) | Category | Diam. | Ref |
|---|---|---|---|---|---|---|---|---|
| 53701 | 2000 DA_{98} | — | February 29, 2000 | Socorro | LINEAR | · | 1.9 km | MPC · JPL |
| 53702 | 2000 DW_{100} | — | February 29, 2000 | Socorro | LINEAR | · | 2.8 km | MPC · JPL |
| 53703 | 2000 DA_{101} | — | February 29, 2000 | Socorro | LINEAR | V | 2.3 km | MPC · JPL |
| 53704 | 2000 DN_{101} | — | February 29, 2000 | Socorro | LINEAR | V | 1.6 km | MPC · JPL |
| 53705 | 2000 DH_{102} | — | February 29, 2000 | Socorro | LINEAR | · | 2.2 km | MPC · JPL |
| 53706 | 2000 DB_{103} | — | February 29, 2000 | Socorro | LINEAR | · | 2.9 km | MPC · JPL |
| 53707 | 2000 DC_{103} | — | February 29, 2000 | Socorro | LINEAR | BRG | 4.7 km | MPC · JPL |
| 53708 | 2000 DZ_{103} | — | February 29, 2000 | Socorro | LINEAR | · | 2.5 km | MPC · JPL |
| 53709 | 2000 DS_{104} | — | February 29, 2000 | Socorro | LINEAR | · | 2.6 km | MPC · JPL |
| 53710 | 2000 DZ_{107} | — | February 28, 2000 | Socorro | LINEAR | · | 1.4 km | MPC · JPL |
| 53711 | 2000 DP_{108} | — | February 29, 2000 | Socorro | LINEAR | · | 1.8 km | MPC · JPL |
| 53712 | 2000 DR_{109} | — | February 29, 2000 | Socorro | LINEAR | · | 4.8 km | MPC · JPL |
| 53713 | 2000 DF_{110} | — | February 29, 2000 | Socorro | LINEAR | · | 1.2 km | MPC · JPL |
| 53714 | 2000 EY | — | March 5, 2000 | Višnjan Observatory | K. Korlević | · | 3.3 km | MPC · JPL |
| 53715 | 2000 EB_{2} | — | March 3, 2000 | Socorro | LINEAR | · | 2.9 km | MPC · JPL |
| 53716 | 2000 EU_{7} | — | March 2, 2000 | Višnjan Observatory | K. Korlević | · | 4.4 km | MPC · JPL |
| 53717 | 2000 EG_{10} | — | March 3, 2000 | Socorro | LINEAR | · | 2.2 km | MPC · JPL |
| 53718 | 2000 EB_{17} | — | March 3, 2000 | Socorro | LINEAR | NYS | 2.2 km | MPC · JPL |
| 53719 | 2000 EP_{19} | — | March 5, 2000 | Socorro | LINEAR | V | 1.9 km | MPC · JPL |
| 53720 | 2000 EN_{24} | — | March 8, 2000 | Kitt Peak | Spacewatch | · | 2.5 km | MPC · JPL |
| 53721 | 2000 EO_{24} | — | March 8, 2000 | Kitt Peak | Spacewatch | MAS | 1.6 km | MPC · JPL |
| 53722 | 2000 ER_{27} | — | March 4, 2000 | Socorro | LINEAR | V | 1.4 km | MPC · JPL |
| 53723 | 2000 EY_{29} | — | March 5, 2000 | Socorro | LINEAR | · | 2.4 km | MPC · JPL |
| 53724 | 2000 ET_{30} | — | March 5, 2000 | Socorro | LINEAR | · | 1.5 km | MPC · JPL |
| 53725 | 2000 EG_{32} | — | March 5, 2000 | Socorro | LINEAR | NYS | 2.4 km | MPC · JPL |
| 53726 | 2000 EL_{34} | — | March 5, 2000 | Socorro | LINEAR | · | 3.5 km | MPC · JPL |
| 53727 | 2000 ET_{34} | — | March 5, 2000 | Socorro | LINEAR | slow | 5.5 km | MPC · JPL |
| 53728 | 2000 ET_{36} | — | March 8, 2000 | Socorro | LINEAR | · | 2.5 km | MPC · JPL |
| 53729 | 2000 EF_{37} | — | March 8, 2000 | Socorro | LINEAR | · | 1.8 km | MPC · JPL |
| 53730 | 2000 EL_{37} | — | March 8, 2000 | Socorro | LINEAR | · | 3.6 km | MPC · JPL |
| 53731 | 2000 EL_{39} | — | March 8, 2000 | Socorro | LINEAR | · | 3.1 km | MPC · JPL |
| 53732 | 2000 EZ_{40} | — | March 8, 2000 | Socorro | LINEAR | MAS | 1.6 km | MPC · JPL |
| 53733 | 2000 EA_{45} | — | March 9, 2000 | Socorro | LINEAR | · | 1.6 km | MPC · JPL |
| 53734 | 2000 EB_{46} | — | March 9, 2000 | Socorro | LINEAR | · | 2.7 km | MPC · JPL |
| 53735 | 2000 EQ_{47} | — | March 9, 2000 | Socorro | LINEAR | · | 3.8 km | MPC · JPL |
| 53736 | 2000 EJ_{48} | — | March 9, 2000 | Socorro | LINEAR | · | 1.7 km | MPC · JPL |
| 53737 | 2000 EQ_{48} | — | March 9, 2000 | Socorro | LINEAR | · | 3.4 km | MPC · JPL |
| 53738 | 2000 EZ_{48} | — | March 9, 2000 | Socorro | LINEAR | · | 1.7 km | MPC · JPL |
| 53739 | 2000 EB_{49} | — | March 9, 2000 | Socorro | LINEAR | · | 3.2 km | MPC · JPL |
| 53740 | 2000 EN_{50} | — | March 10, 2000 | Prescott | P. G. Comba | · | 6.2 km | MPC · JPL |
| 53741 | 2000 ER_{50} | — | March 10, 2000 | Prescott | P. G. Comba | · | 1.7 km | MPC · JPL |
| 53742 | 2000 ED_{55} | — | March 10, 2000 | Kitt Peak | Spacewatch | · | 2.7 km | MPC · JPL |
| 53743 | 2000 EX_{55} | — | March 5, 2000 | Socorro | LINEAR | · | 2.9 km | MPC · JPL |
| 53744 | 2000 ET_{56} | — | March 8, 2000 | Socorro | LINEAR | EUN | 3.9 km | MPC · JPL |
| 53745 | 2000 EG_{57} | — | March 8, 2000 | Socorro | LINEAR | MAS | 1.9 km | MPC · JPL |
| 53746 | 2000 EM_{57} | — | March 8, 2000 | Socorro | LINEAR | MAS | 1.4 km | MPC · JPL |
| 53747 | 2000 EQ_{57} | — | March 8, 2000 | Socorro | LINEAR | · | 1.7 km | MPC · JPL |
| 53748 | 2000 EW_{57} | — | March 8, 2000 | Socorro | LINEAR | · | 3.0 km | MPC · JPL |
| 53749 | 2000 EL_{58} | — | March 8, 2000 | Socorro | LINEAR | GEF | 3.2 km | MPC · JPL |
| 53750 | 2000 EC_{61} | — | March 10, 2000 | Socorro | LINEAR | · | 1.4 km | MPC · JPL |
| 53751 | 2000 EN_{62} | — | March 10, 2000 | Socorro | LINEAR | · | 2.4 km | MPC · JPL |
| 53752 | 2000 EC_{64} | — | March 10, 2000 | Socorro | LINEAR | · | 2.3 km | MPC · JPL |
| 53753 | 2000 EV_{66} | — | March 10, 2000 | Socorro | LINEAR | · | 3.6 km | MPC · JPL |
| 53754 | 2000 ED_{69} | — | March 10, 2000 | Socorro | LINEAR | V | 1.7 km | MPC · JPL |
| 53755 | 2000 EA_{70} | — | March 10, 2000 | Socorro | LINEAR | NYS · | 3.9 km | MPC · JPL |
| 53756 | 2000 EN_{70} | — | March 10, 2000 | Socorro | LINEAR | · | 3.0 km | MPC · JPL |
| 53757 | 2000 EP_{74} | — | March 10, 2000 | Kitt Peak | Spacewatch | · | 4.2 km | MPC · JPL |
| 53758 | 2000 ED_{76} | — | March 5, 2000 | Socorro | LINEAR | · | 2.9 km | MPC · JPL |
| 53759 | 2000 EE_{76} | — | March 5, 2000 | Socorro | LINEAR | · | 2.1 km | MPC · JPL |
| 53760 | 2000 ET_{76} | — | March 5, 2000 | Socorro | LINEAR | · | 2.0 km | MPC · JPL |
| 53761 | 2000 EB_{77} | — | March 5, 2000 | Socorro | LINEAR | · | 1.7 km | MPC · JPL |
| 53762 | 2000 EM_{79} | — | March 5, 2000 | Socorro | LINEAR | · | 3.4 km | MPC · JPL |
| 53763 | 2000 EH_{80} | — | March 5, 2000 | Socorro | LINEAR | · | 1.7 km | MPC · JPL |
| 53764 | 2000 EV_{81} | — | March 5, 2000 | Socorro | LINEAR | · | 5.5 km | MPC · JPL |
| 53765 | 2000 EZ_{82} | — | March 5, 2000 | Socorro | LINEAR | EUN | 3.4 km | MPC · JPL |
| 53766 | 2000 EG_{83} | — | March 5, 2000 | Socorro | LINEAR | · | 3.2 km | MPC · JPL |
| 53767 | 2000 EV_{84} | — | March 8, 2000 | Socorro | LINEAR | fast | 6.2 km | MPC · JPL |
| 53768 | 2000 EW_{84} | — | March 8, 2000 | Socorro | LINEAR | · | 4.4 km | MPC · JPL |
| 53769 | 2000 EU_{85} | — | March 8, 2000 | Socorro | LINEAR | · | 1.8 km | MPC · JPL |
| 53770 | 2000 EA_{86} | — | March 8, 2000 | Socorro | LINEAR | · | 3.2 km | MPC · JPL |
| 53771 | 2000 EL_{86} | — | March 8, 2000 | Socorro | LINEAR | · | 3.5 km | MPC · JPL |
| 53772 | 2000 EJ_{87} | — | March 8, 2000 | Socorro | LINEAR | · | 3.3 km | MPC · JPL |
| 53773 | 2000 EA_{92} | — | March 9, 2000 | Socorro | LINEAR | V | 2.2 km | MPC · JPL |
| 53774 | 2000 EL_{92} | — | March 9, 2000 | Socorro | LINEAR | · | 2.9 km | MPC · JPL |
| 53775 | 2000 EN_{92} | — | March 9, 2000 | Socorro | LINEAR | · | 1.8 km | MPC · JPL |
| 53776 | 2000 EO_{92} | — | March 9, 2000 | Socorro | LINEAR | EUN | 3.9 km | MPC · JPL |
| 53777 | 2000 EP_{92} | — | March 9, 2000 | Socorro | LINEAR | · | 3.3 km | MPC · JPL |
| 53778 | 2000 ER_{92} | — | March 9, 2000 | Socorro | LINEAR | · | 2.7 km | MPC · JPL |
| 53779 | 2000 EV_{93} | — | March 9, 2000 | Socorro | LINEAR | · | 3.6 km | MPC · JPL |
| 53780 | 2000 ED_{94} | — | March 9, 2000 | Socorro | LINEAR | EUN | 3.2 km | MPC · JPL |
| 53781 | 2000 EY_{94} | — | March 9, 2000 | Socorro | LINEAR | ERI | 4.9 km | MPC · JPL |
| 53782 | 2000 EZ_{94} | — | March 9, 2000 | Socorro | LINEAR | · | 2.7 km | MPC · JPL |
| 53783 | 2000 EC_{95} | — | March 9, 2000 | Socorro | LINEAR | · | 3.2 km | MPC · JPL |
| 53784 | 2000 EJ_{97} | — | March 10, 2000 | Socorro | LINEAR | V | 2.0 km | MPC · JPL |
| 53785 | 2000 EL_{97} | — | March 10, 2000 | Socorro | LINEAR | V | 2.2 km | MPC · JPL |
| 53786 | 2000 EM_{97} | — | March 10, 2000 | Socorro | LINEAR | · | 3.9 km | MPC · JPL |
| 53787 | 2000 EX_{101} | — | March 14, 2000 | Kitt Peak | Spacewatch | · | 2.5 km | MPC · JPL |
| 53788 | 2000 EW_{103} | — | March 14, 2000 | Socorro | LINEAR | PHO | 4.3 km | MPC · JPL |
| 53789 | 2000 ED_{104} | — | March 10, 2000 | Socorro | LINEAR | AMO · APO +1km · PHA | 840 m | MPC · JPL |
| 53790 | 2000 EV_{105} | — | March 11, 2000 | Anderson Mesa | LONEOS | · | 4.1 km | MPC · JPL |
| 53791 | 2000 EF_{106} | — | March 11, 2000 | Anderson Mesa | LONEOS | · | 2.1 km | MPC · JPL |
| 53792 | 2000 EU_{109} | — | March 8, 2000 | Kitt Peak | Spacewatch | · | 3.3 km | MPC · JPL |
| 53793 | 2000 EX_{110} | — | March 8, 2000 | Haleakala | NEAT | · | 2.5 km | MPC · JPL |
| 53794 | 2000 EZ_{110} | — | March 8, 2000 | Haleakala | NEAT | · | 2.0 km | MPC · JPL |
| 53795 | 2000 EB_{111} | — | March 8, 2000 | Haleakala | NEAT | TEL | 4.6 km | MPC · JPL |
| 53796 | 2000 EK_{111} | — | March 8, 2000 | Haleakala | NEAT | · | 1.7 km | MPC · JPL |
| 53797 | 2000 EL_{111} | — | March 8, 2000 | Haleakala | NEAT | · | 4.2 km | MPC · JPL |
| 53798 | 2000 ER_{112} | — | March 9, 2000 | Socorro | LINEAR | · | 2.4 km | MPC · JPL |
| 53799 | 2000 EP_{118} | — | March 11, 2000 | Anderson Mesa | LONEOS | · | 4.5 km | MPC · JPL |
| 53800 | 2000 EZ_{118} | — | March 11, 2000 | Anderson Mesa | LONEOS | · | 1.8 km | MPC · JPL |

== 53801–53900 ==
back to top

| Designation | | | Discovery | | | Properties | | Ref |
| Permanent | Provisional | Named after | Date | Site | Discoverer(s) | Category | Diam. | Ref |
|---|---|---|---|---|---|---|---|---|
| 53801 | 2000 EN_{119} | — | March 11, 2000 | Anderson Mesa | LONEOS | · | 4.1 km | MPC · JPL |
| 53802 | 2000 EQ_{120} | — | March 11, 2000 | Anderson Mesa | LONEOS | · | 4.1 km | MPC · JPL |
| 53803 | 2000 EN_{121} | — | March 11, 2000 | Anderson Mesa | LONEOS | GEF | 3.1 km | MPC · JPL |
| 53804 | 2000 ES_{127} | — | March 11, 2000 | Anderson Mesa | LONEOS | · | 2.0 km | MPC · JPL |
| 53805 | 2000 EH_{128} | — | March 11, 2000 | Anderson Mesa | LONEOS | · | 2.5 km | MPC · JPL |
| 53806 | 2000 EG_{130} | — | March 11, 2000 | Anderson Mesa | LONEOS | · | 1.9 km | MPC · JPL |
| 53807 | 2000 EV_{130} | — | March 11, 2000 | Anderson Mesa | LONEOS | NYS | 2.6 km | MPC · JPL |
| 53808 | 2000 EH_{132} | — | March 11, 2000 | Socorro | LINEAR | · | 2.9 km | MPC · JPL |
| 53809 | 2000 EH_{134} | — | March 11, 2000 | Anderson Mesa | LONEOS | · | 2.4 km | MPC · JPL |
| 53810 | 2000 EU_{134} | — | March 11, 2000 | Anderson Mesa | LONEOS | · | 5.5 km | MPC · JPL |
| 53811 | 2000 EV_{135} | — | March 11, 2000 | Anderson Mesa | LONEOS | · | 2.5 km | MPC · JPL |
| 53812 | 2000 EL_{136} | — | March 12, 2000 | Socorro | LINEAR | ADE | 8.2 km | MPC · JPL |
| 53813 | 2000 EM_{136} | — | March 12, 2000 | Socorro | LINEAR | · | 2.9 km | MPC · JPL |
| 53814 | 2000 EH_{137} | — | March 12, 2000 | Farpoint | Farpoint | · | 3.4 km | MPC · JPL |
| 53815 | 2000 EQ_{137} | — | March 9, 2000 | Socorro | LINEAR | · | 4.6 km | MPC · JPL |
| 53816 | 2000 EV_{137} | — | March 9, 2000 | Socorro | LINEAR | · | 7.6 km | MPC · JPL |
| 53817 Gertrudebacon | 2000 EO_{138} | Gertrudebacon | March 11, 2000 | Catalina | CSS | · | 7.8 km | MPC · JPL |
| 53818 Isispogson | 2000 EV_{138} | Isispogson | March 11, 2000 | Catalina | CSS | · | 3.8 km | MPC · JPL |
| 53819 | 2000 ER_{139} | — | March 12, 2000 | Catalina | CSS | EOS | 6.9 km | MPC · JPL |
| 53820 | 2000 EA_{140} | — | March 14, 2000 | Catalina | CSS | · | 1.8 km | MPC · JPL |
| 53821 | 2000 ET_{144} | — | March 3, 2000 | Catalina | CSS | · | 2.1 km | MPC · JPL |
| 53822 | 2000 EW_{144} | — | March 3, 2000 | Catalina | CSS | · | 3.4 km | MPC · JPL |
| 53823 | 2000 ED_{145} | — | March 3, 2000 | Catalina | CSS | · | 1.8 km | MPC · JPL |
| 53824 | 2000 EV_{145} | — | March 3, 2000 | Haleakala | NEAT | · | 2.2 km | MPC · JPL |
| 53825 | 2000 EB_{148} | — | March 4, 2000 | Catalina | CSS | · | 2.4 km | MPC · JPL |
| 53826 | 2000 ER_{148} | — | March 4, 2000 | Catalina | CSS | · | 2.3 km | MPC · JPL |
| 53827 | 2000 EH_{149} | — | March 5, 2000 | Socorro | LINEAR | · | 3.2 km | MPC · JPL |
| 53828 | 2000 ED_{155} | — | March 9, 2000 | Socorro | LINEAR | · | 7.4 km | MPC · JPL |
| 53829 | 2000 EN_{156} | — | March 10, 2000 | Catalina | CSS | · | 2.8 km | MPC · JPL |
| 53830 | 2000 ED_{157} | — | March 11, 2000 | Catalina | CSS | EUN | 4.5 km | MPC · JPL |
| 53831 | 2000 ED_{158} | — | March 12, 2000 | Anderson Mesa | LONEOS | · | 3.4 km | MPC · JPL |
| 53832 | 2000 EQ_{158} | — | March 12, 2000 | Anderson Mesa | LONEOS | · | 3.3 km | MPC · JPL |
| 53833 | 2000 EB_{165} | — | March 3, 2000 | Socorro | LINEAR | · | 2.4 km | MPC · JPL |
| 53834 | 2000 ES_{179} | — | March 4, 2000 | Socorro | LINEAR | · | 4.3 km | MPC · JPL |
| 53835 | 2000 EK_{180} | — | March 4, 2000 | Socorro | LINEAR | · | 4.1 km | MPC · JPL |
| 53836 | 2000 EB_{185} | — | March 5, 2000 | Socorro | LINEAR | · | 5.5 km | MPC · JPL |
| 53837 | 2000 EJ_{185} | — | March 5, 2000 | Haleakala | NEAT | · | 1.8 km | MPC · JPL |
| 53838 | 2000 EA_{194} | — | March 3, 2000 | Socorro | LINEAR | MAS | 1.6 km | MPC · JPL |
| 53839 Schölkopf | 2000 EY_{197} | Schölkopf | March 1, 2000 | Catalina | CSS | (2076) | 2.1 km | MPC · JPL |
| 53840 | 2000 EE_{200} | — | March 1, 2000 | Catalina | CSS | · | 2.4 km | MPC · JPL |
| 53841 | 2000 FX | — | March 26, 2000 | Prescott | P. G. Comba | NYS · | 5.3 km | MPC · JPL |
| 53842 | 2000 FT_{9} | — | March 30, 2000 | Kitt Peak | Spacewatch | NYS | 1.7 km | MPC · JPL |
| 53843 Antjiekrog | 2000 FG_{10} | Antjiekrog | March 30, 2000 | Colleverde | Colleverde | · | 6.8 km | MPC · JPL |
| 53844 | 2000 FO_{11} | — | March 28, 2000 | Socorro | LINEAR | EUN | 3.7 km | MPC · JPL |
| 53845 | 2000 FZ_{11} | — | March 28, 2000 | Socorro | LINEAR | · | 8.1 km | MPC · JPL |
| 53846 | 2000 FD_{13} | — | March 29, 2000 | Socorro | LINEAR | · | 2.9 km | MPC · JPL |
| 53847 | 2000 FJ_{13} | — | March 29, 2000 | Socorro | LINEAR | GEF | 2.9 km | MPC · JPL |
| 53848 | 2000 FT_{13} | — | March 29, 2000 | Socorro | LINEAR | · | 11 km | MPC · JPL |
| 53849 | 2000 FU_{15} | — | March 28, 2000 | Socorro | LINEAR | · | 2.0 km | MPC · JPL |
| 53850 | 2000 FP_{16} | — | March 28, 2000 | Socorro | LINEAR | · | 3.0 km | MPC · JPL |
| 53851 | 2000 FR_{16} | — | March 28, 2000 | Socorro | LINEAR | EUN | 4.6 km | MPC · JPL |
| 53852 | 2000 FM_{17} | — | March 29, 2000 | Socorro | LINEAR | · | 1.9 km | MPC · JPL |
| 53853 | 2000 FN_{18} | — | March 29, 2000 | Socorro | LINEAR | · | 4.3 km | MPC · JPL |
| 53854 | 2000 FB_{19} | — | March 29, 2000 | Socorro | LINEAR | PHO | 3.5 km | MPC · JPL |
| 53855 | 2000 FT_{19} | — | March 29, 2000 | Socorro | LINEAR | V | 2.0 km | MPC · JPL |
| 53856 | 2000 FF_{21} | — | March 29, 2000 | Socorro | LINEAR | · | 4.0 km | MPC · JPL |
| 53857 | 2000 FQ_{21} | — | March 29, 2000 | Socorro | LINEAR | · | 8.3 km | MPC · JPL |
| 53858 | 2000 FT_{22} | — | March 29, 2000 | Socorro | LINEAR | · | 1.5 km | MPC · JPL |
| 53859 | 2000 FZ_{23} | — | March 29, 2000 | Socorro | LINEAR | · | 4.7 km | MPC · JPL |
| 53860 | 2000 FV_{25} | — | March 27, 2000 | Anderson Mesa | LONEOS | · | 2.7 km | MPC · JPL |
| 53861 | 2000 FW_{25} | — | March 27, 2000 | Anderson Mesa | LONEOS | · | 2.3 km | MPC · JPL |
| 53862 | 2000 FA_{26} | — | March 27, 2000 | Anderson Mesa | LONEOS | · | 3.4 km | MPC · JPL |
| 53863 | 2000 FJ_{26} | — | March 27, 2000 | Anderson Mesa | LONEOS | NYS | 3.9 km | MPC · JPL |
| 53864 | 2000 FM_{28} | — | March 27, 2000 | Anderson Mesa | LONEOS | · | 2.1 km | MPC · JPL |
| 53865 | 2000 FS_{29} | — | March 27, 2000 | Anderson Mesa | LONEOS | · | 3.5 km | MPC · JPL |
| 53866 | 2000 FK_{30} | — | March 27, 2000 | Anderson Mesa | LONEOS | · | 1.8 km | MPC · JPL |
| 53867 | 2000 FL_{30} | — | March 27, 2000 | Anderson Mesa | LONEOS | · | 3.5 km | MPC · JPL |
| 53868 | 2000 FP_{30} | — | March 27, 2000 | Anderson Mesa | LONEOS | NYS | 2.6 km | MPC · JPL |
| 53869 | 2000 FS_{30} | — | March 27, 2000 | Anderson Mesa | LONEOS | · | 2.3 km | MPC · JPL |
| 53870 | 2000 FT_{30} | — | March 27, 2000 | Anderson Mesa | LONEOS | · | 5.3 km | MPC · JPL |
| 53871 | 2000 FN_{31} | — | March 28, 2000 | Socorro | LINEAR | · | 3.1 km | MPC · JPL |
| 53872 | 2000 FG_{32} | — | March 29, 2000 | Socorro | LINEAR | · | 1.9 km | MPC · JPL |
| 53873 | 2000 FS_{32} | — | March 29, 2000 | Socorro | LINEAR | · | 2.5 km | MPC · JPL |
| 53874 | 2000 FB_{33} | — | March 29, 2000 | Socorro | LINEAR | MAR | 4.5 km | MPC · JPL |
| 53875 | 2000 FN_{33} | — | March 29, 2000 | Socorro | LINEAR | · | 8.3 km | MPC · JPL |
| 53876 | 2000 FY_{34} | — | March 29, 2000 | Socorro | LINEAR | · | 2.5 km | MPC · JPL |
| 53877 | 2000 FS_{35} | — | March 29, 2000 | Socorro | LINEAR | · | 1.8 km | MPC · JPL |
| 53878 | 2000 FY_{35} | — | March 29, 2000 | Socorro | LINEAR | · | 4.3 km | MPC · JPL |
| 53879 | 2000 FE_{36} | — | March 29, 2000 | Socorro | LINEAR | · | 5.5 km | MPC · JPL |
| 53880 | 2000 FJ_{37} | — | March 29, 2000 | Socorro | LINEAR | · | 3.7 km | MPC · JPL |
| 53881 | 2000 FW_{37} | — | March 29, 2000 | Socorro | LINEAR | V | 2.0 km | MPC · JPL |
| 53882 | 2000 FN_{38} | — | March 29, 2000 | Socorro | LINEAR | · | 3.4 km | MPC · JPL |
| 53883 | 2000 FN_{39} | — | March 29, 2000 | Socorro | LINEAR | · | 1.7 km | MPC · JPL |
| 53884 | 2000 FT_{39} | — | March 29, 2000 | Socorro | LINEAR | · | 3.5 km | MPC · JPL |
| 53885 | 2000 FX_{39} | — | March 29, 2000 | Socorro | LINEAR | · | 2.0 km | MPC · JPL |
| 53886 | 2000 FY_{39} | — | March 29, 2000 | Socorro | LINEAR | · | 3.9 km | MPC · JPL |
| 53887 | 2000 FS_{40} | — | March 29, 2000 | Socorro | LINEAR | · | 2.9 km | MPC · JPL |
| 53888 | 2000 FW_{40} | — | March 29, 2000 | Socorro | LINEAR | V | 2.5 km | MPC · JPL |
| 53889 | 2000 FB_{41} | — | March 29, 2000 | Socorro | LINEAR | · | 2.9 km | MPC · JPL |
| 53890 | 2000 FR_{41} | — | March 29, 2000 | Socorro | LINEAR | · | 2.8 km | MPC · JPL |
| 53891 | 2000 FM_{42} | — | March 29, 2000 | Socorro | LINEAR | PHO | 2.9 km | MPC · JPL |
| 53892 | 2000 FE_{43} | — | March 28, 2000 | Socorro | LINEAR | · | 1.8 km | MPC · JPL |
| 53893 | 2000 FQ_{44} | — | March 29, 2000 | Socorro | LINEAR | · | 2.1 km | MPC · JPL |
| 53894 | 2000 FV_{44} | — | March 29, 2000 | Socorro | LINEAR | · | 2.7 km | MPC · JPL |
| 53895 | 2000 FB_{46} | — | March 29, 2000 | Socorro | LINEAR | · | 3.3 km | MPC · JPL |
| 53896 | 2000 FL_{46} | — | March 29, 2000 | Socorro | LINEAR | · | 1.5 km | MPC · JPL |
| 53897 | 2000 FD_{48} | — | March 29, 2000 | Socorro | LINEAR | · | 2.9 km | MPC · JPL |
| 53898 | 2000 FU_{48} | — | March 30, 2000 | Socorro | LINEAR | · | 2.7 km | MPC · JPL |
| 53899 | 2000 FM_{49} | — | March 30, 2000 | Socorro | LINEAR | · | 1.9 km | MPC · JPL |
| 53900 | 2000 FV_{49} | — | March 30, 2000 | Socorro | LINEAR | · | 3.0 km | MPC · JPL |

== 53901–54000 ==
back to top

| Designation | | | Discovery | | | Properties | | Ref |
| Permanent | Provisional | Named after | Date | Site | Discoverer(s) | Category | Diam. | Ref |
|---|---|---|---|---|---|---|---|---|
| 53901 | 2000 FE_{50} | — | March 30, 2000 | Socorro | LINEAR | PHO | 3.5 km | MPC · JPL |
| 53902 | 2000 FW_{52} | — | March 29, 2000 | Kitt Peak | Spacewatch | MAS | 1.3 km | MPC · JPL |
| 53903 | 2000 FD_{55} | — | March 29, 2000 | Socorro | LINEAR | · | 1.9 km | MPC · JPL |
| 53904 | 2000 FE_{56} | — | March 29, 2000 | Socorro | LINEAR | · | 2.3 km | MPC · JPL |
| 53905 | 2000 FY_{59} | — | March 29, 2000 | Socorro | LINEAR | · | 1.6 km | MPC · JPL |
| 53906 | 2000 FH_{61} | — | March 29, 2000 | Socorro | LINEAR | · | 4.2 km | MPC · JPL |
| 53907 | 2000 GL_{1} | — | April 2, 2000 | Socorro | LINEAR | V | 2.4 km | MPC · JPL |
| 53908 | 2000 GT_{2} | — | April 3, 2000 | Socorro | LINEAR | V | 1.9 km | MPC · JPL |
| 53909 | 2000 GC_{4} | — | April 5, 2000 | Fountain Hills | C. W. Juels | NYS | 4.3 km | MPC · JPL |
| 53910 Jánfischer | 2000 GF_{4} | Jánfischer | April 6, 2000 | Modra | L. Kornoš, D. Kalmančok | · | 3.8 km | MPC · JPL |
| 53911 | 2000 GZ_{4} | — | April 3, 2000 | Socorro | LINEAR | · | 1.7 km | MPC · JPL |
| 53912 | 2000 GL_{5} | — | April 4, 2000 | Socorro | LINEAR | fast | 2.2 km | MPC · JPL |
| 53913 | 2000 GS_{6} | — | April 4, 2000 | Socorro | LINEAR | V | 1.8 km | MPC · JPL |
| 53914 | 2000 GO_{7} | — | April 4, 2000 | Socorro | LINEAR | V | 2.4 km | MPC · JPL |
| 53915 | 2000 GR_{7} | — | April 4, 2000 | Socorro | LINEAR | · | 2.9 km | MPC · JPL |
| 53916 | 2000 GW_{7} | — | April 4, 2000 | Socorro | LINEAR | · | 3.6 km | MPC · JPL |
| 53917 | 2000 GP_{17} | — | April 5, 2000 | Socorro | LINEAR | V | 1.4 km | MPC · JPL |
| 53918 | 2000 GM_{18} | — | April 5, 2000 | Socorro | LINEAR | NYS · | 4.5 km | MPC · JPL |
| 53919 | 2000 GX_{18} | — | April 5, 2000 | Socorro | LINEAR | · | 3.8 km | MPC · JPL |
| 53920 | 2000 GA_{21} | — | April 5, 2000 | Socorro | LINEAR | · | 2.9 km | MPC · JPL |
| 53921 | 2000 GC_{25} | — | April 5, 2000 | Socorro | LINEAR | · | 4.9 km | MPC · JPL |
| 53922 | 2000 GC_{27} | — | April 5, 2000 | Socorro | LINEAR | · | 5.8 km | MPC · JPL |
| 53923 | 2000 GW_{30} | — | April 5, 2000 | Socorro | LINEAR | · | 4.1 km | MPC · JPL |
| 53924 | 2000 GJ_{37} | — | April 5, 2000 | Socorro | LINEAR | · | 6.0 km | MPC · JPL |
| 53925 | 2000 GF_{38} | — | April 5, 2000 | Socorro | LINEAR | · | 3.0 km | MPC · JPL |
| 53926 | 2000 GR_{38} | — | April 5, 2000 | Socorro | LINEAR | · | 4.7 km | MPC · JPL |
| 53927 | 2000 GB_{39} | — | April 5, 2000 | Socorro | LINEAR | · | 6.0 km | MPC · JPL |
| 53928 | 2000 GT_{39} | — | April 5, 2000 | Socorro | LINEAR | · | 2.4 km | MPC · JPL |
| 53929 | 2000 GQ_{40} | — | April 5, 2000 | Socorro | LINEAR | EUN | 3.4 km | MPC · JPL |
| 53930 | 2000 GO_{42} | — | April 5, 2000 | Socorro | LINEAR | · | 2.7 km | MPC · JPL |
| 53931 | 2000 GQ_{42} | — | April 5, 2000 | Socorro | LINEAR | NYS | 2.7 km | MPC · JPL |
| 53932 | 2000 GB_{43} | — | April 5, 2000 | Socorro | LINEAR | · | 4.1 km | MPC · JPL |
| 53933 | 2000 GG_{44} | — | April 5, 2000 | Socorro | LINEAR | · | 4.8 km | MPC · JPL |
| 53934 | 2000 GQ_{44} | — | April 5, 2000 | Socorro | LINEAR | · | 2.6 km | MPC · JPL |
| 53935 | 2000 GK_{45} | — | April 5, 2000 | Socorro | LINEAR | · | 2.9 km | MPC · JPL |
| 53936 | 2000 GO_{45} | — | April 5, 2000 | Socorro | LINEAR | MAS | 1.8 km | MPC · JPL |
| 53937 | 2000 GS_{45} | — | April 5, 2000 | Socorro | LINEAR | V | 1.5 km | MPC · JPL |
| 53938 | 2000 GZ_{45} | — | April 5, 2000 | Socorro | LINEAR | · | 4.9 km | MPC · JPL |
| 53939 | 2000 GM_{46} | — | April 5, 2000 | Socorro | LINEAR | · | 5.4 km | MPC · JPL |
| 53940 | 2000 GU_{47} | — | April 5, 2000 | Socorro | LINEAR | · | 2.1 km | MPC · JPL |
| 53941 | 2000 GD_{48} | — | April 5, 2000 | Socorro | LINEAR | BRA | 3.4 km | MPC · JPL |
| 53942 | 2000 GH_{49} | — | April 5, 2000 | Socorro | LINEAR | · | 2.6 km | MPC · JPL |
| 53943 | 2000 GF_{50} | — | April 5, 2000 | Socorro | LINEAR | V | 1.5 km | MPC · JPL |
| 53944 | 2000 GZ_{51} | — | April 5, 2000 | Socorro | LINEAR | · | 1.8 km | MPC · JPL |
| 53945 | 2000 GK_{52} | — | April 5, 2000 | Socorro | LINEAR | · | 1.9 km | MPC · JPL |
| 53946 | 2000 GC_{53} | — | April 5, 2000 | Socorro | LINEAR | NYS | 2.8 km | MPC · JPL |
| 53947 | 2000 GY_{53} | — | April 5, 2000 | Socorro | LINEAR | · | 4.5 km | MPC · JPL |
| 53948 | 2000 GZ_{53} | — | April 5, 2000 | Socorro | LINEAR | · | 3.0 km | MPC · JPL |
| 53949 | 2000 GO_{54} | — | April 5, 2000 | Socorro | LINEAR | · | 2.9 km | MPC · JPL |
| 53950 | 2000 GX_{56} | — | April 5, 2000 | Socorro | LINEAR | · | 2.2 km | MPC · JPL |
| 53951 | 2000 GC_{58} | — | April 5, 2000 | Socorro | LINEAR | · | 3.5 km | MPC · JPL |
| 53952 | 2000 GF_{59} | — | April 5, 2000 | Socorro | LINEAR | EUN | 2.9 km | MPC · JPL |
| 53953 | 2000 GP_{59} | — | April 5, 2000 | Socorro | LINEAR | · | 5.2 km | MPC · JPL |
| 53954 | 2000 GD_{60} | — | April 5, 2000 | Socorro | LINEAR | · | 1.6 km | MPC · JPL |
| 53955 | 2000 GJ_{60} | — | April 5, 2000 | Socorro | LINEAR | · | 4.1 km | MPC · JPL |
| 53956 | 2000 GP_{60} | — | April 5, 2000 | Socorro | LINEAR | · | 3.3 km | MPC · JPL |
| 53957 | 2000 GJ_{61} | — | April 5, 2000 | Socorro | LINEAR | · | 3.4 km | MPC · JPL |
| 53958 | 2000 GN_{61} | — | April 5, 2000 | Socorro | LINEAR | · | 3.2 km | MPC · JPL |
| 53959 | 2000 GY_{61} | — | April 5, 2000 | Socorro | LINEAR | · | 3.7 km | MPC · JPL |
| 53960 | 2000 GQ_{62} | — | April 5, 2000 | Socorro | LINEAR | THM | 6.0 km | MPC · JPL |
| 53961 | 2000 GB_{63} | — | April 5, 2000 | Socorro | LINEAR | · | 2.4 km | MPC · JPL |
| 53962 | 2000 GK_{63} | — | April 5, 2000 | Socorro | LINEAR | KOR | 2.9 km | MPC · JPL |
| 53963 | 2000 GQ_{63} | — | April 5, 2000 | Socorro | LINEAR | · | 2.7 km | MPC · JPL |
| 53964 | 2000 GO_{64} | — | April 5, 2000 | Socorro | LINEAR | · | 3.0 km | MPC · JPL |
| 53965 | 2000 GY_{64} | — | April 5, 2000 | Socorro | LINEAR | · | 2.6 km | MPC · JPL |
| 53966 | 2000 GA_{65} | — | April 5, 2000 | Socorro | LINEAR | · | 2.8 km | MPC · JPL |
| 53967 | 2000 GC_{65} | — | April 5, 2000 | Socorro | LINEAR | · | 1.6 km | MPC · JPL |
| 53968 | 2000 GO_{65} | — | April 5, 2000 | Socorro | LINEAR | · | 2.2 km | MPC · JPL |
| 53969 | 2000 GV_{65} | — | April 5, 2000 | Socorro | LINEAR | · | 2.0 km | MPC · JPL |
| 53970 | 2000 GC_{66} | — | April 5, 2000 | Socorro | LINEAR | MAS | 1.6 km | MPC · JPL |
| 53971 | 2000 GJ_{66} | — | April 5, 2000 | Socorro | LINEAR | · | 2.0 km | MPC · JPL |
| 53972 | 2000 GM_{66} | — | April 5, 2000 | Socorro | LINEAR | · | 3.3 km | MPC · JPL |
| 53973 | 2000 GB_{67} | — | April 5, 2000 | Socorro | LINEAR | NYS | 2.4 km | MPC · JPL |
| 53974 | 2000 GD_{67} | — | April 5, 2000 | Socorro | LINEAR | KOR | 3.3 km | MPC · JPL |
| 53975 | 2000 GA_{68} | — | April 5, 2000 | Socorro | LINEAR | · | 6.3 km | MPC · JPL |
| 53976 | 2000 GY_{69} | — | April 5, 2000 | Socorro | LINEAR | · | 1.6 km | MPC · JPL |
| 53977 | 2000 GM_{70} | — | April 5, 2000 | Socorro | LINEAR | · | 3.2 km | MPC · JPL |
| 53978 | 2000 GH_{71} | — | April 5, 2000 | Socorro | LINEAR | · | 2.3 km | MPC · JPL |
| 53979 | 2000 GC_{73} | — | April 5, 2000 | Socorro | LINEAR | · | 6.8 km | MPC · JPL |
| 53980 | 2000 GK_{73} | — | April 5, 2000 | Socorro | LINEAR | · | 3.4 km | MPC · JPL |
| 53981 | 2000 GQ_{73} | — | April 5, 2000 | Socorro | LINEAR | V | 1.4 km | MPC · JPL |
| 53982 | 2000 GG_{74} | — | April 5, 2000 | Socorro | LINEAR | · | 6.8 km | MPC · JPL |
| 53983 | 2000 GW_{74} | — | April 5, 2000 | Socorro | LINEAR | · | 2.8 km | MPC · JPL |
| 53984 | 2000 GZ_{76} | — | April 5, 2000 | Socorro | LINEAR | · | 2.0 km | MPC · JPL |
| 53985 | 2000 GG_{77} | — | April 5, 2000 | Socorro | LINEAR | · | 3.7 km | MPC · JPL |
| 53986 | 2000 GH_{77} | — | April 5, 2000 | Socorro | LINEAR | · | 3.6 km | MPC · JPL |
| 53987 | 2000 GR_{77} | — | April 5, 2000 | Socorro | LINEAR | · | 1.4 km | MPC · JPL |
| 53988 | 2000 GW_{78} | — | April 5, 2000 | Socorro | LINEAR | · | 2.6 km | MPC · JPL |
| 53989 | 2000 GT_{79} | — | April 5, 2000 | Socorro | LINEAR | · | 1.2 km | MPC · JPL |
| 53990 | 2000 GZ_{79} | — | April 6, 2000 | Socorro | LINEAR | · | 1.7 km | MPC · JPL |
| 53991 | 2000 GF_{81} | — | April 6, 2000 | Socorro | LINEAR | · | 1.6 km | MPC · JPL |
| 53992 | 2000 GJ_{83} | — | April 3, 2000 | Socorro | LINEAR | · | 1.9 km | MPC · JPL |
| 53993 | 2000 GN_{83} | — | April 3, 2000 | Socorro | LINEAR | · | 4.5 km | MPC · JPL |
| 53994 | 2000 GS_{84} | — | April 3, 2000 | Socorro | LINEAR | · | 2.2 km | MPC · JPL |
| 53995 | 2000 GA_{88} | — | April 4, 2000 | Socorro | LINEAR | (2076) | 1.6 km | MPC · JPL |
| 53996 | 2000 GC_{88} | — | April 4, 2000 | Socorro | LINEAR | GEF | 2.8 km | MPC · JPL |
| 53997 | 2000 GD_{88} | — | April 4, 2000 | Socorro | LINEAR | · | 7.6 km | MPC · JPL |
| 53998 | 2000 GW_{88} | — | April 4, 2000 | Socorro | LINEAR | · | 3.3 km | MPC · JPL |
| 53999 | 2000 GS_{89} | — | April 4, 2000 | Socorro | LINEAR | · | 2.4 km | MPC · JPL |
| 54000 | 2000 GN_{90} | — | April 4, 2000 | Socorro | LINEAR | · | 1.7 km | MPC · JPL |

back to top

== See also ==
- Meanings of minor-planet names: 53001–54000
