= Critical-list minor planet =

Numbered minor planet with uncertain position and orbit

A critical-list minor planet (critical list numbered object or critical object) is a numbered minor planet for which existing measurements of the orbit and position are especially in need of improvement.

The IAU's Minor Planet Center (MPC) regularly publishes a list of these critical objects in their Minor Planet Electronic Circular. The list typically contains asteroids that have been observed at a small number of apparitions, especially on opposition, or that have not been adequately observed for more than 10 years, while other observatories create their own, customized lists. The MPC also lists currently observable critical objects on their website, providing differently formatted lists of orbital elements to the worldwide astrometric community.

Lowell Observatory publishes their own critical list, distinctly different from the MPC, instead focusing on objects with high ephemeris uncertainty. Specifically, objects with computed ephemeris uncertainty greater than 2 arcseconds over the next 10 years, and objects whose orbits degrade significantly when temporally isolated observations are ignored, are included in the list.

== Minor Planet Center List ==
As of December 2024, the MPC includes 650 objects in their observable critical list. The following list contains all critical objects within the first 100,000 numbered minor planets, the full list can be found in the MPL website:

- 1915 Quetzálcoatl
- (2135) Aristaeus
- (2340) Hathor
- (3362) Khufu
- (3753) Cruithne
- (5335) Damocles
- (5381) Sekhmet
- (5590) 1990 VA
- (7066) Nessus
- (7236) 1987 PA
- (7822) 1991 CS
- (10370) Hylonome
- (11885) Summanus
- (14827) Hypnos
- (15504) 1999 RG33
- (15788) 1993 SB
- (15807) 1994 GV9
- (15809) 1994 JS
- 15810 Arawn
- (15820) 1994 TB
- (15836) 1995 DA2
- (15875) 1996 TP66
- (15883) 1997 CR29
- (16636) 1993 QP
- (16684) 1994 JQ1
- (19255) 1994 VK8
- (19299) 1996 SZ4
- (19308) 1996 TO66
- (19521) Chaos
- (20108) 1995 QZ9
- (20161) 1996 TR66
- (20255) 1998 FX_{2}
- (20425) 1998 VD_{35}
- (20461) Dioretsa
- (24952) 1997 QJ4
- (24978) 1998 HJ151
- (26181) 1996 GQ21
- (26310) 1998 TX_{6}
- (26375) 1999 DE9
- (26379) 1999 HZ_{1}
- (26817) 1987 QB
- (31662) 1999 HP_{11}
- (32929) 1995 QY9
- (33128) 1998 BU48
- (35670) 1998 SU_{27}
- (35671) 1998 SN165
- (37117) Narcissus
- (38083) Rhadamanthus
- (38239) 1999 OR_{3}
- (40314) 1999 KR16
- (41440) 2000 HZ_{23}
- (42301) 2001 UR163
- (45802) 2000 PV29
- (48639) 1995 TL8
- 49036 Pelion
- (49673) 1999 RA215
- (52387) Huitzilopochtli
- (52747) 1998 HM151
- (52760) 1998 ML14
- (52975) Cyllarus
- (53311) Deucalion
- (53409) 1999 LU_{7}
- (53429) 1999 TF_{5}
- (54509) YORP
- (54520) 2000 PJ30
- (55576) Amycus
- 55637 Uni
- (59358) 1999 CL158
- (60454) 2000 CH105
- (60458) 2000 CM114
- (60620) 2000 FD8
- (60621) 2000 FE8
- (63252) 2001 BL41
- (65407) 2002 RP120
- (66253) 1999 GT_{3}
- (66452) 1999 OF4
- (66652) Borasisi
- (68347) 2001 KB_{67}
- (68950) 2002 QF15
- (69986) 1998 WW24
- (69987) 1998 WA25
- (69988) 1998 WA31
- (69990) 1998 WU31
- (76803) 2000 PK30
- 78799 Xewioso
- (79969) 1999 CP133
- (79978) 1999 CC158
- (79983) 1999 DF9
- (80806) 2000 CM105
- (82157) 2001 FM185
- (82158) 2001 FP185
- (83982) Crantor
- (84719) 2002 VR128
- (85585) 1998 FG_{2}
- (85627) 1998 HP151
- (85633) 1998 KR65
- (85640) 1998 OX4
- (85770) 1998 UP1
- (85953) 1999 FK_{21}
- (86047) 1999 OY3
- (86450) 2000 CK_{33}
- (86667) 2000 FO_{10}
- (87269) 2000 OO67
- (88213) 2001 AF_{2}
- (88267) 2001 KE76
- (88268) 2001 KK76
- (88269) 2001 KF77
- (88611) Teharonhiawako
- (89136) 2001 US_{16}
- (91133) 1998 HK151
- (91205) 1998 US43
- (91554) 1999 RZ215
- (95625) 2002 GX32
- 98943 Torifune

== See also ==
- Distant minor planet
- Lost minor planet
- Unusual minor planet
