= 78799 Xewioso =

Trans-Neptunian object

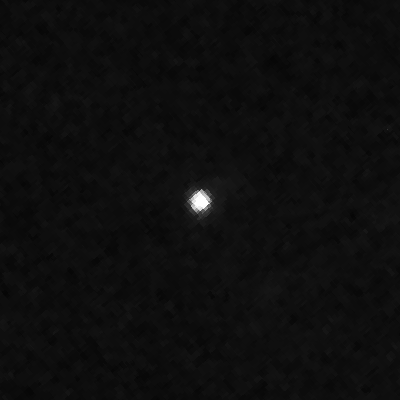
- Hubble Space Telescope image of Xewioso taken on 20 September 2008

Discovery
- Discovered by: Palomar Obs.
- Discovery site: Palomar Obs.
- Discovery date: 10 December 2002

Designations
- Pronunciation: /ˌhɛviˈoʊsoʊ/
- Named after: Xɛvioso
- Alternative designations: 2002 XW_{93}
- Minor planet category: TNO · classical (inner/hot) · other TNO · distant

Orbital characteristics
- Epoch 2025 May 05 (JD 2460800.5)
- Uncertainty parameter 2
- Observation arc: 35.19 yr (12,854 d)
- Earliest precovery date: 17 December 1989
- Aphelion: 46.88 AU
- Perihelion: 28.49 AU
- Semi-major axis: 37.68 AU
- Eccentricity: 0.2439
- Orbital period (sidereal): 231.33 yr (84493±4 d)
- Mean anomaly: 153.53°
- Mean motion: 0° 0^{m} 15.34^{s} / day
- Inclination: 14.3307°
- Longitude of ascending node: 46.700°
- Argument of perihelion: 248.55°
- Known satellites: 0

Physical characteristics
- Mean diameter: 565+71 −73 km
- Geometric albedo: 0.038+0.043 −0.025
- Absolute magnitude (H): 5.4±0.7; 4.86 (JPL/MPC)

78799 Xewioso (provisional designation 2002 XW_{93}) is a trans-Neptunian object located in the inner edge of the Kuiper belt. It has a dark surface with a diameter between 490 and 640 kilometers (300 and 400 mi). It was discovered on 10 December 2002 by astronomers at Palomar Observatory in California.

== History ==
=== Discovery ===
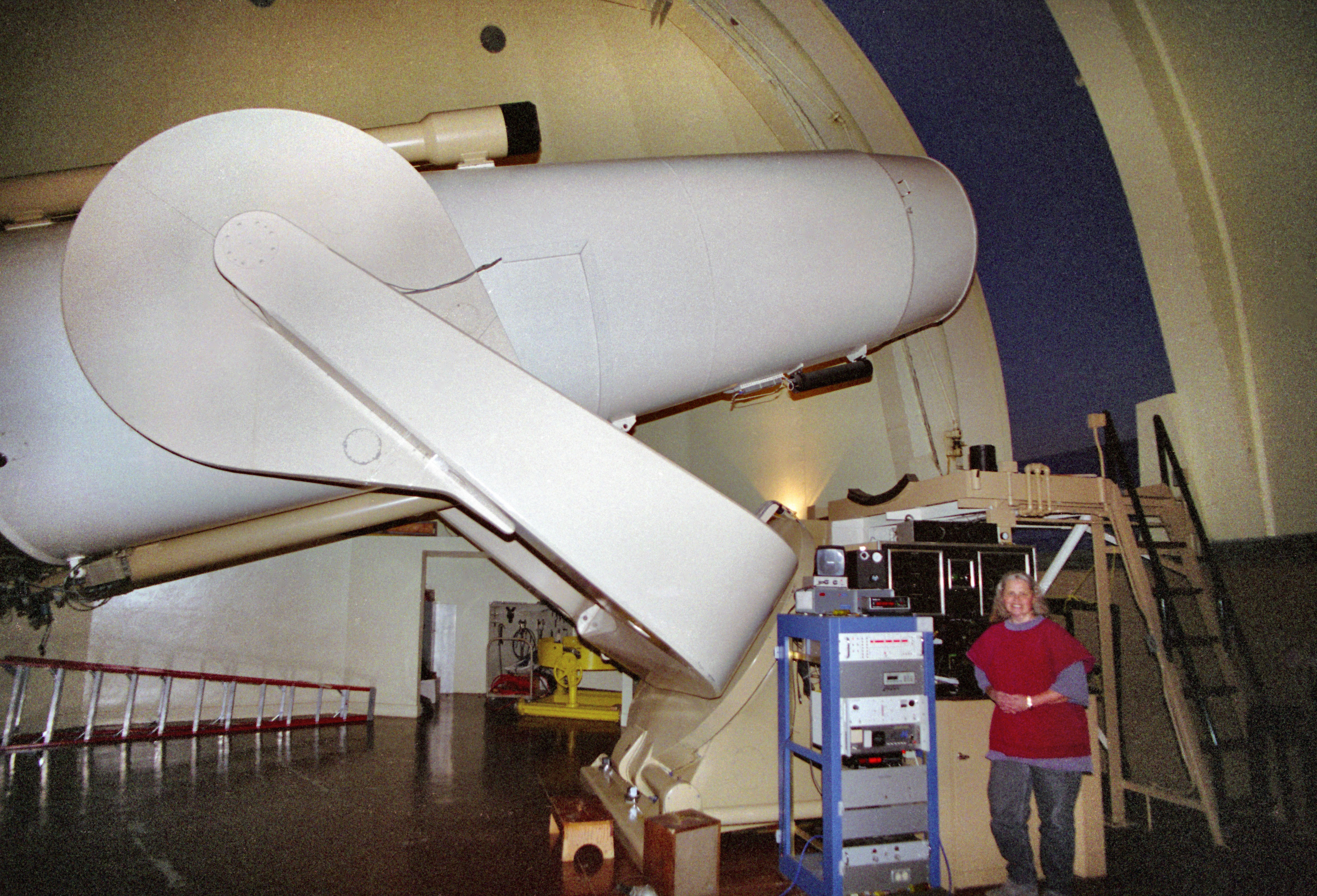
The 1.2-meter Samuel Oschin telescope that was used to discover Xewioso at Palomar Observatory back on 10 December 2002.

Xewioso was discovered on 10 December 2002 by a team of astronomers at Palomar Observatory in California. The discovery team included Chad Trujillo, Michael E. Brown, Eleanor F. Helin, Steven Pravdo, Kenneth Lawrence, Michael D. Hicks, who were using Palomar's 1.22-meter (48 in) Samuel Oschin telescope. Follow-up observations were taken by Trujillo using Palomar's 1.52-meter (60 in) telescope on 4 and 5 January 2003, and results were reported to the Minor Planet Center. The team's discovery of Xewioso alongside the trans-Neptunian objects 2002 WC19 and 2002 XV93 was announced by the MPC on 5 January 2003. The discovery of Xewioso formed part of Trujillo and Brown's Caltech Wide Area Sky Survey at Palomar Observatory, which aimed to find bright, Pluto-sized Kuiper belt objects like Quaoar, Máni, and Aya.

In December 2003, the MPC published the first identified precovery observations of Xewioso, which included a pair of photographic plates from Palomar Observatory's Digitized Sky Survey. The earliest of these photographic plates came from 17 December 1989, which was found by Reiner M. Stoss. This 1989 plate remains as the earliest known precovery observation of Xewioso.

=== Naming and numbering ===
The object is named after Xɛ̀vioso, a thunder god in the mythologies of the Tado (Fon and Ewe) peoples of West Africa. The naming of this object was announced by the International Astronomical Union's Working Group for Small Body Nomenclature on 1 September 2025. Before Xewioso was officially named, it was known by its provisional designation 2002 XW_{93}, which indicates the year and half-month of the object's discovery date. Xewioso's minor planet catalog number of 78799 was given by the MPC on 6 February 2004.

== Orbit and classification ==
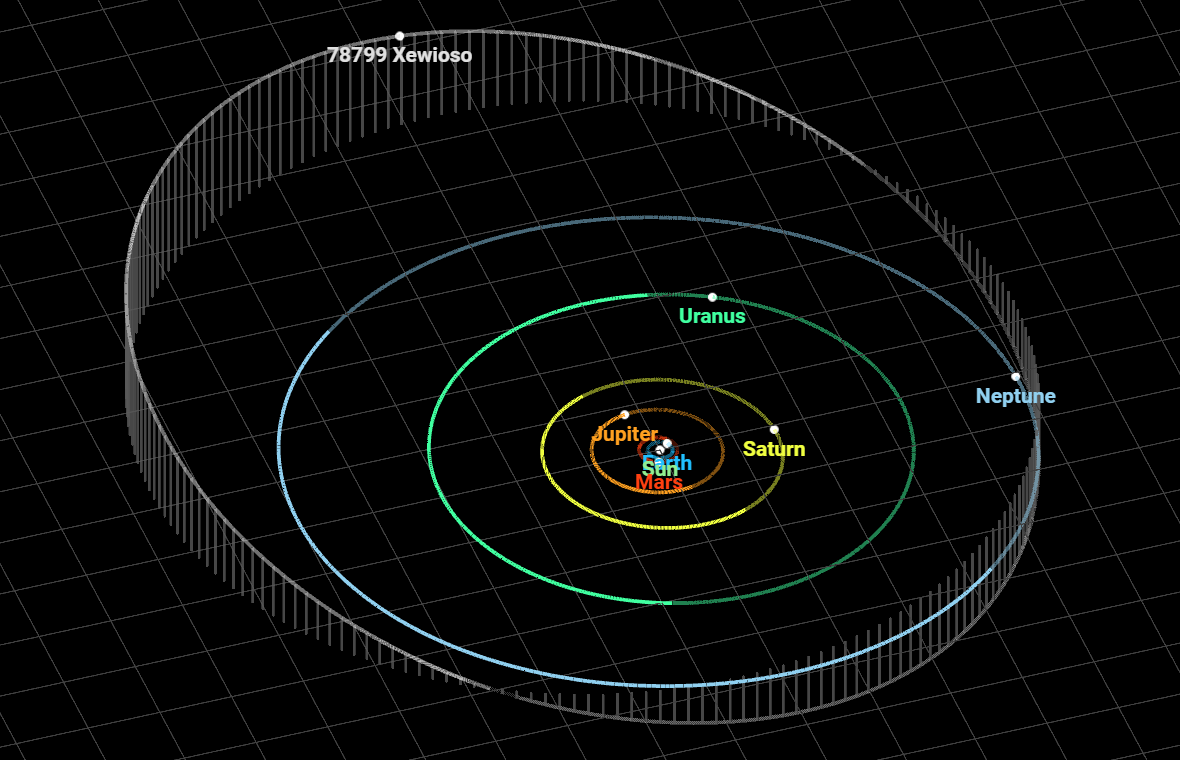
Diagram showing the orbit of Xewioso (white) and the giant planets

Xewioso orbits the Sun at a distance of 28–47 AU (average 38 AU) once about every 230 years. Since its average orbital distance or semi-major axis is greater than Neptune's, Xewioso is considered a trans-Neptunian object. Its orbit has an eccentricity of 0.24 and an inclination of 14° with respect to the ecliptic. It previously passed perihelion in 1926, when it was nearest to the Sun.

Xewioso orbits at the inner edge of the Kuiper belt with a high orbital inclination, so it can be considered an inner classical Kuiper belt object of the dynamically "hot" (high-inclination) population. Because Xewioso's orbit crosses Neptune's orbit, it can also be technically considered a centaur according to the Deep Ecliptic Survey's definition.

== Physical characteristics ==
Xewioso is a dark object with an extremely low geometric albedo of between 0.01 and 0.08 and an absolute magnitude of 5.4, which corresponds to a diameter of roughly 490 to 640 km (300 to 400 mi). These measurements come from 2010 observations by the Herschel Space Observatory, which could determine Xewioso's size by detecting its far-infrared thermal emission. However the color and rotation period of Xewioso are unknown and its absolute magnitude also has significant uncertainty.

Based on its size of 565+71
−73 km, it belongs to the proposed class of "mid-sized" TNOs between 400 and 1,000 km (250 and 620 mi) in diameter, which are believed to represent the transition between small, low-density TNOs and large, high-density dwarf planets. Planetary scientists have hypothesized that mid-sized TNOs should have highly porous and unheated interiors, because TNOs in this size range (namely Uni and Gǃkúnǁʼhòmdímà) have been found to have low densities around 1 g/cm^{3}. However, Xewioso is not known to have any natural satellites or moons, which means there is currently no way to measure its mass and density.

== See also ==
- 2002 XV93
- List of trans-Neptunian objects
- List of minor planets: 78001–79000
- List of possible dwarf planets
