= (524366) 2001 XR254 =

Kuiper belt object

(524366) 2001 XR_{254}
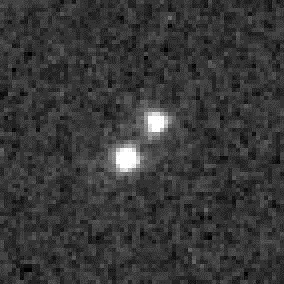
- Hubble Space Telescope image of 2001 XR_{254} and its satellite, taken in 2007.

Discovery
- Discovered by: D. C. Jewitt; S. S. Sheppard; J. Kleyna
- Discovery site: Mauna Kea Obs.
- Discovery date: 10 December 2001

Designations
- Minor planet category: TNO · cubewano cold

Orbital characteristics
- Epoch 27 April 2019 (JD 2458600.5)
- Uncertainty parameter 4 · 3
- Observation arc: 14.26 yr (5,207 d)
- Aphelion: 44.374 AU
- Perihelion: 41.178 AU
- Semi-major axis: 42.776 AU
- Eccentricity: 0.0374
- Orbital period (sidereal): 279.78 yr (102,188 d)
- Mean anomaly: 226.02°
- Mean motion: 0° 0^{m} 12.6^{s} / day
- Inclination: 1.2309°
- Longitude of ascending node: 180.01°
- Time of perihelion: ≈ 7 September 2120 ±1 month
- Argument of perihelion: 78.868°
- Known satellites: 1 (D: 140 km; P: 125.58 d)

Physical characteristics
- Mean diameter: 221+41 −71 km (combined); 171+32 −55 km (primary)
- Mass: (4.055±0.048)×10^{18} kg
- Mean density: 1.00+0.96 −0.56 g/cm^{3} (Note: Assuming that both components have equal albedos and equal densities)
- Geometric albedo: 0.136+0.168 −0.044
- Spectral type: V−I = 1.06±0.12
- Absolute magnitude (H): 5.7; 6.05

(524366) 2001 XR_{254} is a trans-Neptunian object and binary system from the classical Kuiper belt, located in the outermost region of the Solar System. The cubewano belongs to the cold population and measures approximately 171 kilometers (110 miles). It was first observed on 10 December 2001, by astronomers at the Mauna Kea Observatory, Hawaii. Its 140-kilometer-sized companion was discovered by the Hubble Space Telescope in June 2006.

== Discovery and orbit ==
2001 XR_{254} was discovered on 10 December 2001 by David C. Jewitt, Scott S. Sheppard and Jan Kleyna using 2.2-meter University of Hawaii reflector on Mauna Kea. 2001 XR_{254} belongs to the dynamically cold population of the classical Kuiper belt objects, with small orbital eccentricities and inclinations. Their semi-major axes reside mainly in the interval 40–45 AU.

== Satellite ==
2001 XR_{254} is a binary consisting of two components of approximately equal size. Assuming that both components have the same albedo, the primary is estimated to be about 170 km in diameter. The size of the secondary (satellite) in this case is estimated at 140 km. The total mass of the system is about 4×10^{18} kg. The average density of both components is about 1 g/cm^{3}.

Orbital parameters of the 2001 XR_{254} system
Semi-major axis (km)	Eccentricity	Period (d)	Inclination (°)
9311 ± 52	0.5561 ± 0.0047	125.579 ± 0.048	41.08 ± 0.22

== Numbering and naming ==
This minor planet was numbered by the Minor Planet Center on 18 May 2019 (M.P.C. 114619). As of 2025, it has not been named.

== Physical characteristics ==
The surfaces of both components of 2001 XR_{254} appear to have a neutral color.
