= 90568 Goibniu =

Classical Kuiper belt object

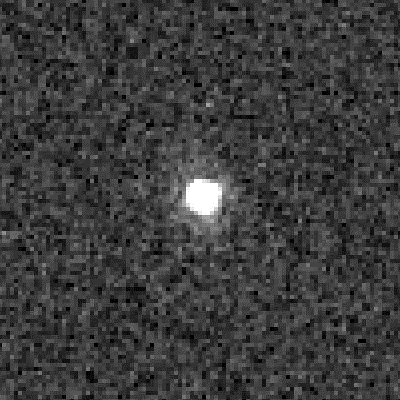
- Goibniu imaged by the Hubble Space Telescope on 17 March 2010

Discovery
- Discovered by: NEAT (obs. code 644)
- Discovery site: Palomar Obs.
- Discovery date: 13 April 2004

Designations
- Pronunciation: /ˈɡɔɪvnjuː/
- Named after: Goibniu (mod. Gaibhne)
- Alternative designations: 2004 GV_{9}
- Minor planet category: TNO; classical (hot); distant; Scat-Ext

Orbital characteristics (barycentric)
- Epoch 5 May 2025 (JD 2460800.5)
- Uncertainty parameter 0 or 1
- Observation arc: 70+ yr
- Earliest precovery date: 21 December 1954
- Aphelion: 45.160 AU
- Perihelion: 38.730 AU
- Semi-major axis: 41.945 AU
- Eccentricity: 0.0766
- Orbital period (sidereal): 271.48 yr (99,158 d)
- Mean anomaly: 48.258°
- Mean motion: 0° 0^{m} 13.07^{s} / day
- Inclination: 21.983°
- Longitude of ascending node: 250.605°
- Argument of perihelion: 292.116°
- Known satellites: 0

Physical characteristics
- Mean diameter: 680±34 km
- Mean density: 1.14–1.49 g/cm^{3} >0.37 g/cm^{3} (lower limit)
- Sidereal rotation period: 5.86±0.03 hrs
- Geometric albedo: 0.077+0.0084 −0.0077
- Spectral type: BR; B−V = 0.95; V−R = 0.52; B_{0}−V_{0} = 0.843
- Apparent magnitude: 19.9
- Absolute magnitude (H): 4.25±0.04 (2012); 3.96 (JPL)

90568 Goibniu (provisional designation 2004 GV_{9}) is a large trans-Neptunian object that was discovered in 2004 by the Near-Earth Asteroid Tracking survey at Palomar Observatory. It is classified as a classical Kuiper belt object of the dynamically "hot" population, which follow highly inclined or eccentric orbits around the Sun.

Goibniu is 680 ± 34 km (423 ± 21 mi) in diameter, according to measurements of its infrared thermal emission by the Herschel and Spitzer space telescopes. It shows small variations in brightness (0.16 magnitudes) over its 5.86-hour rotation period. Some astronomers have suggested that Goibniu is large enough that it could be a dwarf planet. However, the shape of Goibniu is unknown–it could either be a spheroid with small albedo spots or an ellipsoid whose rotation axis is pointed towards Earth. Furthermore, its low albedo suggests it has never been resurfaced and thus is unlikely to have the planetary geology thought to be typical of larger dwarf planets.

== History ==
=== Discovery ===
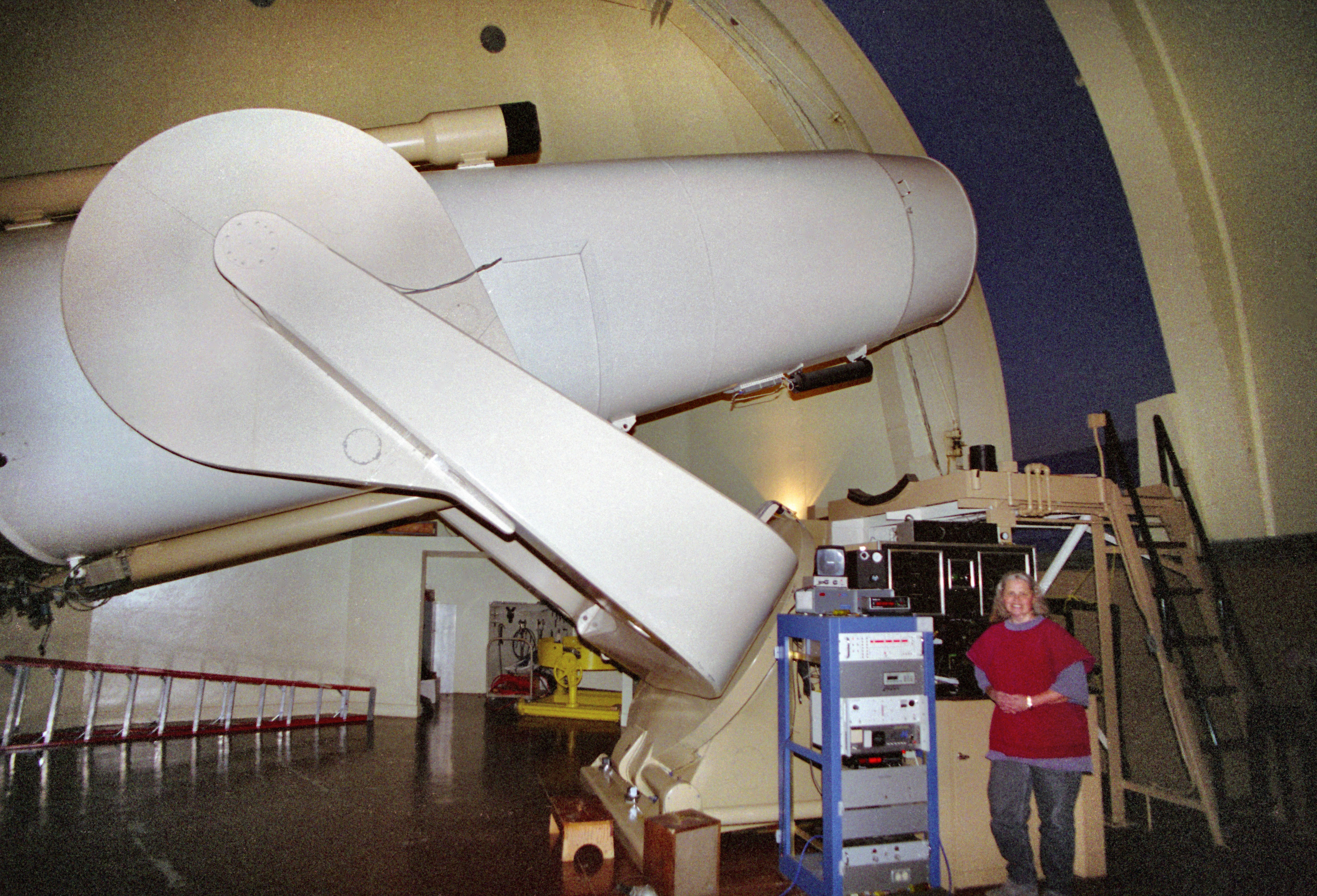
The 1.2-meter Samuel Oschin telescope that was used to discover Goibniu on 13 April 2004

Goibniu was discovered on 13 April 2004 by the Near-Earth Asteroid Tracking (NEAT) survey, which was a NASA-directed project for finding near-Earth asteroids in the sky using telescopes at various observatories across the United States. The telescope that discovered Goibniu was the 1.22-meter (48 in) Samuel Oschin telescope at Palomar Observatory in San Diego County, California. The people involved in making the discovery observations at Palomar included Steven Pravdo, D. MacDonald, Kenneth Lawrence and Michael D. Hicks. The discovery of Goibniu was announced by the Minor Planet Center (MPC) on 14 April 2004, after several other observatories observed the object.

==== Precovery ====
Precovery observations of Goibniu were first reported by astronomer Reiner Stoss and published by the MPC on 10 June 2004. These precovery observations, which came from Digitized Sky Survey images from 1993–1997, allowed for an accurate determination of Goibniu's orbit without the need for follow-up observations. Even earlier precovery observations have since been reported, from dates as early as December 1954.

=== Number and name ===
==== Number ====
This object has the minor planet provisional designation 2004 GV_{9}, which was given by the MPC in the discovery announcement. The provisional designation indicates the year and half-month of the object's discovery date. 2004 GV_{9} received its permanent minor planet catalog number of 90568 from the MPC on 30 August 2004.

==== Name ====
Until 2025, 2004 GV_{9} did not have a proper name and the discoverers' privilege for naming this object expired ten years after it was numbered. According to naming guidelines by the International Astronomical Union's Working Group for Small Bodies Nomenclature, 2004 GV_{9} was open for name suggestions that relate to creation myths, as recommended for Kuiper belt objects in general. On 1 September 2025, it was officially named Goibniu, after the Irish god of metallurgy and hospitality.

== Orbit ==
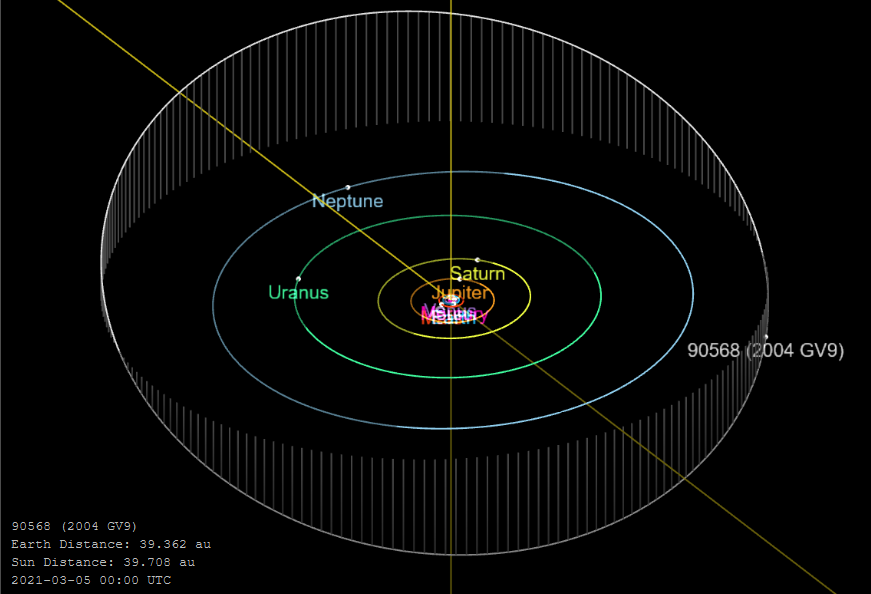
Diagram showing Goibniu's orbit (gray) around the Sun, with the outer planets shown

Goibniu is a trans-Neptunian object orbiting the Sun at a semi-major axis or average distance of 41.9 astronomical units (AU). (Note: These orbital elements are expressed in terms of the Solar System Barycenter (SSB) as the frame of reference. Due to planetary perturbations, the Sun revolves around the SSB at non-negligible distances, so heliocentric-frame orbital elements and distances can vary in short timescales as shown in JPL-Horizons.) It has an orbital eccentricity of 0.08 and an inclination of 22° with respect to the ecliptic. In its 271-year-long orbit, Goibniu comes as close as 38.7 AU from the Sun at perihelion and as far as 45.2 AU from the Sun at aphelion.

=== Classification ===
Goibniu is located in the classical region of the Kuiper belt 39–48 AU from the Sun, and is thus classified as a classical Kuiper belt object (sometimes known as a "cubewano"). The high orbital inclination of Goibniu makes it a dynamically "hot" member of the classical Kuiper belt. The hot classical Kuiper belt objects are believed to have been scattered by Neptune's gravitational influence during the Solar System's early history.

== Physical characteristics ==
=== Size ===
History of size estimates for Goibniu
| Year | Diameter (km) | Method | References |
|---|---|---|---|
| 2007 | 677.2+71.3 −69.3 | Thermal modelling (Spitzer telescope) | |
| 2008 | 636 | Assumed albedo | |
| 2008 | 684+68 −78 | Thermal (Spitzer) | |
| 2010 | 677 | Assumed albedo | |
| 2012 | 680±34 | Thermal modelling (Herschel) | |

According to measurements of its infrared thermal emission by the Herschel and Spitzer space telescopes, Goibniu has a diameter of 680 ± 34 km (423 ± 21 mi) Goibniu is large enough that some astronomers including Noemi Pinilla-Alonso and Michael Brown once considered it as a possible dwarf planet. Gonzalo Tancredi also considered it as a possible dwarf planet in 2010, though he did not propose its official classification to the International Astronomical Union. However, its low albedo suggests it has never been resurfaced and thus is unlikely to have the planetary geology thought to be typical of dwarf planets.

=== Rotation, shape and density ===
Based on light curve observations, Goibniu rotates once on its axis every 5.86±0.03 hours. Goibniu has a fairly low light curve amplitude of 0.16±0.03, which suggests that it could either be a spheroid with small albedo spots or an ellipsoid whose rotation axis is pointed towards Earth. However light curve studies measured that it has an estimated b to a axis ratio being around b/a = 1.16±0.03. Its mass and density is unknown, because it has no known moons for scientists to calculate the exact mass and density of it through Kepler's third law. However, its density can still be estimated through assuming that it is a stable Jacobi ellipsoid. Then the results of its density will be approximately between 1.14 to 1.49 g/cm³ with an absolute lowest limit of 0.37 g/cm³.

=== Surface and spectra ===
Goibniu is a moderately red trans-Neptunian object with a measured V-R color index of approximately 0.52. It has a dark surface with a very low geometric albedo of about 0.077+0.0084
−0.0077.

== See also ==
- List of possible dwarf planets
  - 145452 Ritona – a classical Kuiper belt object and possible dwarf planet similar to Goibniu in size
- List of Solar System objects by size
