= (444030) 2004 NT33 =

Kuiper Belt object

(444030) 2004 NT_{33}
Discovery
- Discovered by: Palomar team
- Discovery site: Palomar Obs.
- Discovery date: 13 July 2004

Designations
- Minor planet category: TNO · cubewano Extended

Orbital characteristics
- Epoch 4 September 2017 (JD 2458000.5)
- Uncertainty parameter 3
- Observation arc: 33.99 yr (12,415 days)
- Earliest precovery date: 10 August 1982
- Aphelion: 50.014 AU
- Perihelion: 36.838 AU
- Semi-major axis: 43.426 AU
- Eccentricity: 0.1517
- Orbital period (sidereal): 286.18 yr (104,527 days)
- Mean anomaly: 41.709°
- Mean motion: 0° 0^{m} 12.24^{s} / day
- Inclination: 31.231°
- Longitude of ascending node: 240.87°
- Argument of perihelion: 37.400°
- Known satellites: 0

Physical characteristics
- Dimensions: 423+87 −80 km
- Synodic rotation period: 7.87±0.05 h
- Geometric albedo: 0.125
- Spectral type: Prominent water (H_{2}O/"bowl" type)
- Apparent magnitude: 20.94
- Absolute magnitude (H): 4.4 · 4.7

(444030) 2004 NT_{33} is a trans-Neptunian object from the classical Kuiper belt, approximately 450 kilometers in diameter. It was discovered on 13 July 2004, by astronomers at Palomar Observatory, California, United States.

== Orbit and classification ==
2004 NT_{33} is a "cubewano", a classical, low-eccentricity object in the Kuiper belt, that orbits the Sun at a distance of 36.8–50.0 AU once every 286 years and 2 months (104,527 days). Its orbit has an eccentricity of 0.15 and an inclination of 31° with respect to the ecliptic. It is currently 39 AU from the Sun.

A first precovery was taken at the Siding Spring Observatory in 1982, extending the body's observation arc by 22 years prior to its official discovery observation at Palomar.

== Physical characteristics ==
=== Rotation period ===
In 2009, astronomers obtained a rotational lightcurve of 2004 NT_{33} from photometric observations, which were taken at the Galileo National Telescope (TNG) on the island of La Palma, and at the Sierra Nevada Observatory in Granada, both located in Spain. The ambiguous lightcurve gave a rotation period of 7.87 hours with a low brightness amplitude of 0.04 magnitude.

=== Diameter and albedo ===
According to the "TNOs are Cool" survey, using observations from the space-based Herschel and Spitzer telescopes, 2004 NT_{33} measures 423 kilometers in diameter and its surface has a visual geometric albedo of 0.125.

== Naming ==
As of 2025, this minor planet remains unnamed.
