= (42301) 2001 UR163 =

Trans-Neptunian object

(42301) 2001 UR_{163}
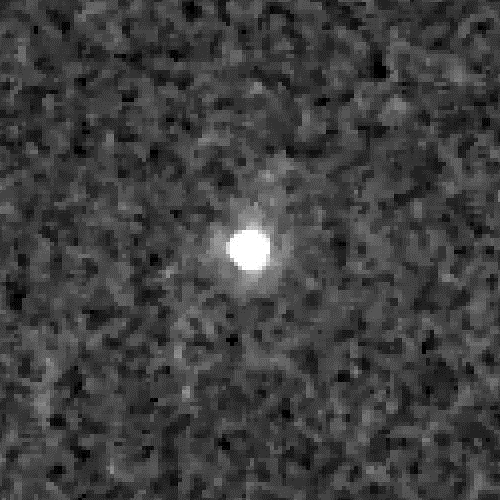
- Hubble Space Telescope image of 2001 UR_{163} taken in 2005

Discovery
- Discovered by: DES
- Discovery site: Kitt Peak National Obs.
- Discovery date: 21 October 2001

Designations
- Minor planet category: TNO · 4:9 res distant

Orbital characteristics
- Epoch 1 July 2021 (JD 2459396.5)
- Uncertainty parameter 2
- Observation arc: 38.45 yr (14,045 d)
- Aphelion: 66.643 AU
- Perihelion: 36.987 AU
- Semi-major axis: 51.815 AU
- Eccentricity: 0.2862
- Orbital period (sidereal): 372.98 yr (136,232 d)
- Mean anomaly: 80.814°
- Mean motion: 0° 0^{m} 9.36^{s} / day
- Inclination: 0.7531°
- Longitude of ascending node: 301.39°
- Time of perihelion: 8 October 1937
- Argument of perihelion: 344.50°
- Known satellites: 0

Physical characteristics
- Mean diameter: 352±85 km
- Geometric albedo: 0.209±0.08
- Spectral type: RR-U (very red); B–V = 1.25±0.11; V–R = 0.88±0.06; V–I = 1.54±0.16
- Apparent magnitude: 21.3
- Absolute magnitude (H): 4.21

(42301) 2001 UR_{163} is a resonant trans-Neptunian object located in the outermost region of the Solar System. The object measures approximately 352 kilometers (220 miles) in diameter with a high albedo and stays in an uncommon orbital resonance (4:9) with Neptune. It was discovered on 21 October 2001 by astronomers of the Deep Ecliptic Survey program at Kitt Peak National Observatory near Tucson, Arizona, United States.

== Classification and orbit ==
2001 UR_{163} orbits the Sun at a distance of 37.0–66.6 AU once every 372 years and 12 months (136,232 days; semi-major axis of 51.82 AU). Its orbit has an eccentricity of 0.29 and an inclination of 1° with respect to the ecliptic. It came to perihelion on 8 October 1937, and has since been moving away from the Sun. In 2006, it moved beyond a distance of 50 AU and is at 53.7 AU as of 2021. The body's observation arc begins with a precovery, published by the Digitized Sky Survey and taken at the Siding Spring Observatory in July 1982.

== Numbering and naming ==
2001 UR_{163} was numbered (42301) by the Minor Planet Center on 26 May 2002 (M.P.C. 45686). As of 2025, it has not been named. According to the established naming conventions, it will receive a mythological or mythic name (not necessarily from Classical mythology).

== Physical characteristics ==
Lightcurve analysis shows only small deviations, suggesting that 2001 UR_{163} is a spheroid with small albedo spots. Observations with Spitzer's Infrared Array Camera were used to study the body's surface composition. The analyzed data indicate the presence of 20% water ice, 60% amorphous silicates, and 20% organic compounds, including complex ones such as tholins.

=== Diameter and albedo ===
2001 UR_{163} measures approximately 352 kilometers (220 miles) in diameter with a high albedo of 0.209.

Based on previous estimates published on the Lightcurve Data Base and on Michael Brown's website, 2001 UR_{163} measures between 531 km (330 mi) and 583 kilometers (360 miles), using an assumed intermediate surface albedo of 0.09 to 0.10 with an absolute magnitude of 4.49 and 4.4, respectively.
