= (19255) 1994 VK8 =

Cubewano

(19255) 1994 VK_{8}
- Its orbit around the Sun.

Discovery
- Discovered by: A. Fitzsimmons; D. O'Ceallaigh; I. P. Williams
- Discovery site: Roque de los Muchachos Obs.
- Discovery date: 8 November 1994

Designations
- Minor planet category: cubewano (cold)

Orbital characteristics
- Epoch 13 January 2016 (JD 2457400.5)
- Uncertainty parameter 4
- Observation arc: 7347 days (20.11 yr)
- Aphelion: 44.40611 AU (6.643060 Tm)
- Perihelion: 41.34116 AU (6.184550 Tm)
- Semi-major axis: 42.87364 AU (6.413805 Tm)
- Eccentricity: 0.035744
- Orbital period (sidereal): 280.73 yr (102538 d)
- Average orbital speed: 4.56 km/s
- Mean anomaly: 267.925°
- Mean motion: 0° 0^{m} 12.639^{s} / day
- Inclination: 1.48856°
- Longitude of ascending node: 72.3924°
- Argument of perihelion: 112.111°
- T_{Jupiter}: 5.857

Physical characteristics
- Dimensions: 175 km
- Mass: 5.6×10^{18} kg
- Mean density: 2.0 g/cm^{3}
- Equatorial surface gravity: 0.0489 m/s^{2}
- Equatorial escape velocity: 0.0925 km/s
- Synodic rotation period: 9 h (0.38 d)
- Geometric albedo: 0.09 (assumed)
- Temperature: ~43 K
- Spectral type: ?
- Absolute magnitude (H): 7.0

(19255) 1994 VK_{8} is a trans-Neptunian object (TNO) of the "cold" cubewano class orbiting the Sun in the Kuiper belt of the outer Solar System. It was discovered on November 8, 1994, by Alan Fitzsimmons, Donal O'Ceallaigh, and Iwan P. Williams at Roque de los Muchachos Observatory on the island of La Palma, Spain.

1994 VK_{8} is the fourth cubewano to be given an official Minor Planet Center catalog number. The first three official cubewanos are 15760 Albion, (15807) 1994 GV9, and (16684) 1994 JQ1.
