= (68950) 2002 QF15 =

Near-Earth asteroid

(68950) 2002 QF_{15}
Discovery
- Discovered by: LINEAR
- Discovery site: Lincoln Lab's ETS
- Discovery date: 27 August 2002

Designations
- Minor planet category: NEO · PHA · Apollo

Orbital characteristics
- Epoch 4 September 2017 (JD 2458000.5)
- Uncertainty parameter 0
- Observation arc: 61.85 yr (22,591 days)
- Aphelion: 1.4206 AU
- Perihelion: 0.6930 AU
- Semi-major axis: 1.0568 AU
- Eccentricity: 0.3442
- Orbital period (sidereal): 1.09 yr (397 days)
- Mean anomaly: 216.46°
- Mean motion: 0° 54^{m} 25.92^{s} / day
- Inclination: 25.155°
- Longitude of ascending node: 236.24°
- Argument of perihelion: 255.51°
- Earth MOID: 0.0068 AU · 2.6 LD

Physical characteristics
- Dimensions: 1.12±0.03 km 3.49 km (calculated)
- Synodic rotation period: 29 h (Note: Pravec (2003) web: rotation period 29 hours with a brightness amplitude of 0.3 mag. Summary figures at Collaborative Asteroid Lightcurve Link for (68950) and unpublished data sheet from the Ondrejov Asteroid Photometry Project); 47.0±0.5 h
- Geometric albedo: 0.040 (assumed); 0.428±0.029
- Spectral type: S
- Absolute magnitude (H): 16.4

(68950) 2002 QF_{15} is a stony asteroid, classified as near-Earth object and potentially hazardous asteroid of the Apollo group, that measures approximately 2 kilometers in diameter. It was discovered on 27 August 2002, by the LINEAR project at Lincoln Laboratory's Experimental Test Site in Socorro, New Mexico, United States.

== Orbit and classification ==
2002 QF_{15} is a S-type asteroid that orbits the Sun at a distance of 0.7–1.4 AU once every 1 years and 1 month (397 days). Its orbit has an eccentricity of 0.34 and an inclination of 25° with respect to the ecliptic. Taken at Palomar Observatory in 1955, a first precovery from the during the Digitized Sky Survey extends the body's observation arc by 47 years prior to its official discovery observation at Socorro.

It has an Earth minimum orbital intersection distance 0.0063 AU (942,000 km), which translates into 2.6 LD.

== Physical characteristics ==
In June 2006, a rotational lightcurve of 2002 QF_{15} was obtained from photometric observation taken by American astronomer Brian Warner at his Palmer Divide Observatory in Colorado. Lightcurve analysis gave a rotation period of 47 hours with a brightness variation of 0.35 magnitude (U=2), superseding a lightcurve previously obtained by Czech astronomer Petr Pravec at Ondřejov Observatory in 2003, which gave a shorter period of 29 hours and an amplitude of 0.3 magnitude (U=2-).

According to the survey carried out by the Japanese Akari satellite, the asteroid measures 1.12 kilometers in diameter and its surface has an albedo of 0.428, while the Collaborative Asteroid Lightcurve Link assumes an albedo of 0.040 and calculates a diameter of 3.49 kilometers with an absolute magnitude of 16.4.

== Numbering and naming ==
This minor planet was numbered by the Minor Planet Center on 10 September 2003. As of 2018, it has not been named.
