= (508869) 2002 VT130 =

Trans-Neptunian object

(508869) 2002 VT_{130}
Discovery
- Discovered by: M. W. Buie
- Discovery site: Kitt Peak Obs.
- Discovery date: 7 November 2002

Designations
- Minor planet category: TNO · binary cubewano (cold)

Orbital characteristics
- Epoch 27 April 2019 (JD 2458600.5)
- Uncertainty parameter 3
- Observation arc: 14.39 yr (5,256 d)
- Aphelion: 43.716 AU
- Perihelion: 40.710 AU
- Semi-major axis: 42.213 AU
- Eccentricity: 0.0356
- Orbital period (sidereal): 274.27 yr (100,177 d)
- Mean anomaly: 125.69°
- Mean motion: 0° 0^{m} 12.96^{s} / day
- Inclination: 1.1643°
- Longitude of ascending node: 334.29°
- Argument of perihelion: 337.65°
- Known satellites: 1 (D: 205 km; P: 30.76 d)

Physical characteristics
- Mean diameter: 324+57 −68 km (combined)
- Mass: (2.36±0.17)×10^{18} kg (orbit 1) or (2.27±0.16)×10^{18} kg (orbit 2)
- Geometric albedo: 0.097+0.098 −0.049
- Spectral type: V−R = 0.56±0.10; B–V = 1.45
- Absolute magnitude (H): 5.7

(508869) 2002 VT_{130} is a trans-Neptunian object and binary system from the classical Kuiper belt, located in the outermost region of the Solar System. It was discovered by American astronomer Marc Buie at Kitt Peak Observatory on 7 November 2002. The primary measures approximately 324 kilometers (201 miles) in diameter.

The object belongs to the cold classical population and is a binary.

== Satellite ==
The companion was discovered by Keith Noll, Will Grundy, Susan Benecchi, and Hal Levison using Hubble Space Telescope on 21 September 2008. The discovery was announced on 24 September 2009. The moon's apparent separation from the primary was 3026±90 km with an orbital period of 30.7615±0.0064 d.

== Physical characteristics ==
The estimated combined size of 2002 VT_{130} is about 324+57
−68 km. Johnston's Archive estimates a mean diameter of 251 km for the primary, and 205 km for the satellite based on a secondary-to-primary diameter ratio of 0.817. 2002 VT_{130} shows significant photometric variability with a lightcurve amplitude of 0.21 magnitudes, which indicates one of its components has an elongated shape.
