= (612095) 1999 OJ4 =

Trans-Neptunian binary

(612095) 1999 OJ_{4}
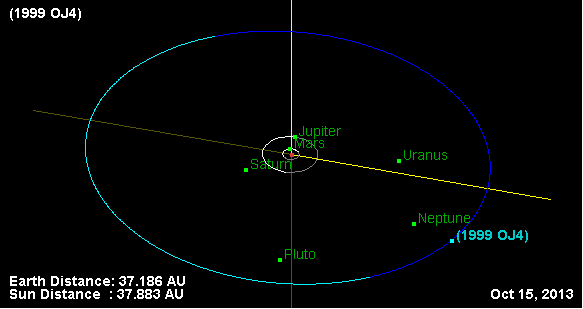
- Orbital diagram of 1999 OJ_{4}

Discovery
- Discovered by: Mauna Kea Obs.
- Discovery site: Mauna Kea Obs.
- Discovery date: 18 July 1999

Designations
- Minor planet category: TNO · cubewano cold

Orbital characteristics
- Epoch 27 April 2019 (JD 2458600.5)
- Uncertainty parameter 4
- Observation arc: 9.21 yr (3,363 d)
- Aphelion: 39.013 AU
- Perihelion: 37.200 AU
- Semi-major axis: 38.107 AU
- Eccentricity: 0.0238
- Orbital period (sidereal): 235.24 yr (85,921 d)
- Mean anomaly: 294.62°
- Mean motion: 0° 0^{m} 15.12^{s} / day
- Inclination: 3.9954°
- Longitude of ascending node: 127.44°
- Argument of perihelion: 285.68°
- Known satellites: 1 (D: 72 km; P: 84.12 d)

Physical characteristics
- Mean diameter: 75 km
- Mass: (4.045±0.063)×10^{17} kg (system)
- Geometric albedo: 0.1 (assumed); 0.225; 0.215
- Spectral type: B–V = 1.68; V–R = 0.682
- Absolute magnitude (H): 7.1

(612095) 1999 OJ_{4} is a trans-Neptunian object and binary system from the classical Kuiper belt, located in the outermost region of the Solar System.

The bright cubewano belongs to the cold population and measures approximately 75 kilometers (47 miles) in diameter. It was first observed at Mauna Kea Observatory on 18 July 1999. Discovered in 2005, its moon is just 3 kilometers smaller than its primary and has an orbital period of 84 days.

== Orbit and classification ==
1999 OJ_{4}'s orbit characterizes it as a classical Kuiper Belt object, or cubewano. Due to its nearly circular orbit and low inclination, it is also in the "cold" population of cubewanos. As a result, it is likely reddish in color.

== Satellite ==
1999 OJ_{4} has one moon. This moon was discovered by the Hubble Space Telescope on 5 October 2013. It orbits 3306±17 km away from 1999 OJ_{4}, completing one orbit every 84.1147±0.0050 d. The orbit has an eccentricity of 0.3683±0.0038.

At about 72 km, it is nearly the same size as 1999 OJ_{4}. From the surface of 1999 OJ_{4}, it would have an apparent diameter of roughly 8.11°, (Note: Calculated by solving $\scriptstyle{\mathrm{tan}\left(\frac{\theta}{2}\right) = \frac{\mathrm{radius~of~moon}}{\mathrm{distance~from~surface~of~asteroid~to~center~of~moon}}}$.) over fourteen times the apparent size of the Sun from Earth.
