= (556416) 2014 OE394 =

Large cubewano and possible dwarf planet

(556416) 2014 OE_{394}
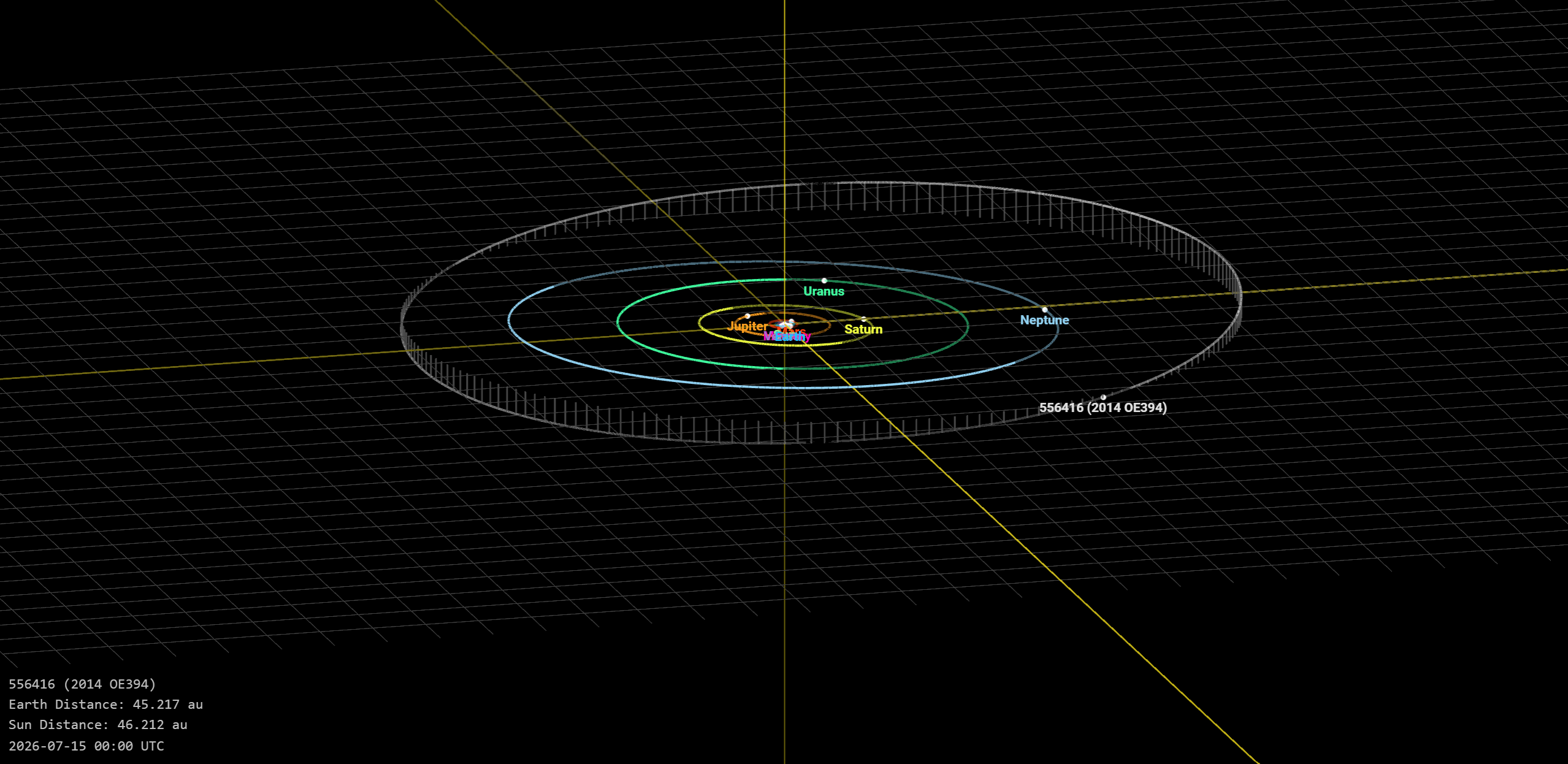
- Orbit diagram of (556416) 2014 OE_{394}

Discovery
- Discovered by: Pan-STARRS (F51)
- Discovery site: F51, Haleakala Observatory
- Discovery date: 28 July 2014

Designations
- Minor planet category: Classical Kuiper belt object

Orbital characteristics
- Epoch 31 July 2016 (JD 2457600.5)
- Uncertainty parameter 2
- Observation arc: 1452 days (5 oppositions)
- Aphelion: 51.976 AU
- Perihelion: 40.805 ± 0.002 AU
- Semi-major axis: 46.391 AU
- Eccentricity: 0.12040 ± 0.00005
- Orbital period (sidereal): 316 years
- Mean anomaly: 70.25469°
- Inclination: 3.93206 ± 0.00008°
- Longitude of ascending node: 308.87986 ± 0.0004°
- Argument of perihelion: 259.35897 ± 0.008°
- Known satellites: 0

Physical characteristics
- Mean diameter: 304–486 km (est.); 280-540 km (est.); 240-730 km (est.)
- Albedo: 0.15+0.08 −0.06 (geometric albedo) (est.); 0.054+0.040 −0.026(bond albedo) (est.)
- Spectral type: B–V = 0.996±0.140 (est.); V–R = 0.630±0.086 (est.)
- Absolute magnitude (H): 4.62; 4.65

(556416) 2014 OE_{394} is a classical Kuiper belt object that was discovered in July 2014 by the Pan-STARRS 1 telescope, and announced on 17 July 2016. It is one of the brighter trans-Neptunian objects, being the 34th brightest cubewano as of 23 July 2016. Its exact size is unknown, but it is most likely between 304 and 486 kilometers across.

2014 OE_{394} was observed by the New Horizons probe in September 2017 and August 2018. It passed about 8.7 AU away from 2014 OE_{394} on 1 January 2017, and 7.5 AU on 1 January 2019.

== Physical characteristics ==
=== Size ===
2014 OE_{394} has an assumed diameter of 304 – 486 km, calculated by its assumed geometric albedo of 0.15+0.08
−0.06, and the authors have acknowledged that it is a possible dwarf planet.

=== Spectra and surface ===
2014 OE_{394} has assumed color indices of B-V 0.996 ± 0.140, and V-R 0.630 ± 0.086, and as said before, its assumed geometric albedo is 0.15+0.08
−0.06, its assumed bond albedo is 0.054+0.040
−0.026, and its surface composition is unknown.

== See also ==
- (119951) 2002 KX14, one of the largest cold classical Kuiper belt objects
