= (35671) 1998 SN165 =

Trans-Neptunian object

(35671) 1998 SN_{165}
- The orbit of 1998 SN_{165} around the Sun

Discovery
- Discovered by: A. Gleason
- Discovery site: Kitt Peak Obs.
- Discovery date: 23 September 1998

Designations
- Minor planet category: TNO · cubewano p-DP · distant

Orbital characteristics
- Epoch 1 July 2021 (JD 2459396.5)
- Uncertainty parameter 2
- Observation arc: 22.26 yr (8,129 d)
- Aphelion: 39.662 AU
- Perihelion: 36.453 AU
- Semi-major axis: 38.058 AU
- Eccentricity: 0.0422
- Orbital period (sidereal): 234.79 yr (85,755 d)
- Mean anomaly: 301.71°
- Mean motion: 0° 0^{m} 15.12^{s} / day
- Inclination: 4.5986°
- Longitude of ascending node: 192.07°
- Time of perihelion: 15 July 2065 (Note: JPL Horizons Observer Location: @sun (Perihelion occurs when deldot changes from negative to positive. Uncertainty in time of perihelion is 3-sigma, ±9 days.))
- Argument of perihelion: 257.82°
- Known satellites: 0

Physical characteristics
- Mean diameter: 393±39 km; 446±80 km; 460±80 km; 473 km (radiometric)
- Synodic rotation period: 8.84 h
- Geometric albedo: 0.043; 0.060
- Spectral type: Prominent water (H_{2}O/"bowl" type); BB (grey-blue); BR = 1.13 · 1.123; B-V = 0.712 · 0.710; V-R = 0.444 · 0.420; V-I = 0.861 · 0.820
- Absolute magnitude (H): 5.68

(35671) 1998 SN_{165} is a trans-Neptunian object from the Kuiper belt located in the outermost region of the Solar System. It was discovered on 23 September 1998, by American astronomer Arianna Gleason at the Kitt Peak National Observatory near Tucson, Arizona. The cold classical Kuiper belt object is a dwarf planet candidate, as it measures approximately 400 kilometers (250 miles) in diameter. It has a grey-blue color (BB) and a rotation period of 8.8 hours. As of 2025, it has not been named.

== Orbit and classification ==
1998 SN_{165} orbits the Sun at a distance of 36.5–39.7 AU once every 234 years and 9 months (85,755 days; semi-major axis of 38.06 AU). Its orbit has an eccentricity of 0.04 and an inclination of 5° with respect to the ecliptic. As of 2021 the object is at 37.2 AU, approaching the Sun until 15 July 2065, when it will come to perihelion. The body's observation arc begins at Kitt Peak in September 1998, just eight nights prior to its official discovery observation.

1998 SN_{165} is a non-resonant cubewano, also known as a classical Kuiper belt object, and is part of the less populous cubewano group orbiting between Neptune and the resonant plutino population. It has a low-eccentricity orbit, and thus belongs to the cold population, distinct from the "stirred" hot population with inclinations higher than 5°. In a previous publication, the object was originally classified as a plutino.

== Numbering and naming ==
This minor planet was numbered by the Minor Planet Center on 27 February 2002 and received the number 35671 in the minor planet catalog (M.P.C. 44869). As of 2025, it has not been named. According to the established naming conventions, it will receive a mythological or mythic name (not necessarily from Classical mythology), in particular one associated with creation.

== Physical characteristics ==
1998 SN_{165} has a blue-grey color (BB), with various color indices measured, giving a difference between the blue and red filter magnitude (BR) of 1.123 and 1.13, respectively.

=== Rotation period ===
In February 2001, a rotational lightcurve of 1998 SN_{165} was obtained from photometric observations by Pedro Lacerda and Jane Luu. Lightcurve analysis gave an ambiguous rotation period of 8.84 hours with a brightness amplitude of 0.16 magnitude (U=2). An alternative period of 8.70 hours is also possible.

=== Diameter and albedo ===
According to observations by the space-based Herschel and Spitzer telescopes, 1998 SN_{165} measures between 393 and 460 kilometers and its surface has a low albedo between 0.043 and 0.060. While Johnston's Archive adopts a diameter of 393 kilometers, astronomer Michael Brown gives a radiometric diameter of 473 kilometers. The Collaborative Asteroid Lightcurve Link assumes an albedo of 0.10 and calculates a diameter of 334 kilometers based on an absolute magnitude of 5.5. A generic magnitude-to-diameter conversion with an albedo of 0.09 gives a diameter of 352 kilometers.
