= (120348) 2004 TY364 =

Classical Kuiper belt object

(120348) 2004 TY_{364}
Discovery
- Discovered by: M. E. Brown; C. Trujillo; D. L. Rabinowitz
- Discovery site: Palomar Obs.
- Discovery date: 3 October 2004

Designations
- Minor planet category: TNO · cubewano SCATEXTD; Other

Orbital characteristics
- Epoch 13 January 2016 (JD 2457400.5)
- Uncertainty parameter 3
- Observation arc: 11834 days (32.40 yr)
- Earliest precovery date: 16 July 1983
- Aphelion: 41.384 AU (6.1910 Tm)
- Perihelion: 36.176 AU (5.4119 Tm)
- Semi-major axis: 38.780 AU (5.8014 Tm)
- Eccentricity: 0.067140
- Orbital period (sidereal): 241.50 yr (88208.5 d)
- Mean anomaly: 265.93°
- Mean motion: 0° 0^{m} 14.692^{s} / day
- Inclination: 24.8499°
- Longitude of ascending node: 140.6141°
- Time of perihelion: ≈ 12 May 2079 ±6 days
- Argument of perihelion: 359.71°
- Known satellites: 0
- Earth MOID: 35.1896 AU (5.26429 Tm)
- Jupiter MOID: 30.8216 AU (4.61085 Tm)

Physical characteristics
- Dimensions: 512+37 −40 km
- Synodic rotation period: 11.70 h (0.488 d)
- Geometric albedo: 0.107+0.020 −0.015
- Temperature: 45.5 K (perihelion)
- Spectral type: CO_{2}-type ("double-dip")
- Apparent magnitude: 20.4
- Absolute magnitude (H): 4.520±0.070, 4.8

(120348) 2004 TY_{364} is a trans-Neptunian object. It is an inner classical Kuiper belt object in the definition by Gladman, Marsden, and Van Laerhoven (e<0.24). Its inclination of almost 25 degrees disqualifies it as such in Marc Buie's definition. It is also not listed as a scattered disc object by the Minor Planet Center. It was discovered by Michael E. Brown, Chad Trujillo and David L. Rabinowitz on October 3, 2004 at the Palomar Observatory.

Light curve analysis suggests it is not a dwarf planet.

As of 2014, it is 39.2 AU from the Sun.
