= (52747) 1998 HM151 =

Cubewano

(52747) 1998 HM_{151}

Discovery
- Discovered by: Mauna Kea Observatory
- Discovery date: 29 April 1998

Designations
- Minor planet category: TNO (cubewano)

Orbital characteristics
- Epoch 13 January 2016 (JD 2457400.5)
- Uncertainty parameter 3
- Observation arc: 2220 days (6.08 yr)
- Aphelion: 47.072 AU (7.0419 Tm)
- Perihelion: 41.859 AU (6.2620 Tm)
- Semi-major axis: 44.465 AU (6.6519 Tm)
- Eccentricity: 0.058619
- Orbital period (sidereal): 296.51 yr (108301 d)
- Mean anomaly: 316.41°
- Mean motion: 0° 0^{m} 11.967^{s} / day
- Inclination: 0.54451°
- Longitude of ascending node: 63.952°
- Argument of perihelion: 245.90°

Physical characteristics
- Mean diameter: 116 km
- Absolute magnitude (H): 7.9

(52747) 1998 HM_{151} is a cubewano. It has a perihelion (closest approach to the Sun) at 41.902 AU and an aphelion (farthest approach from the Sun) at 47.500 AU. It is 116 km in diameter. It was discovered on 29 April 1998, by astronomers at the Mauna Kea Observatory, Hawaii.
