= 1998 WW31 =

Binary Kuiper belt object

1998 WW_{31}
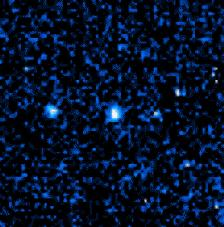
- Hubble Space Telescope image of 1998 WW_{31} and its satellite in orbit

Discovery
- Discovered by: M. W. Buie; R. L. Millis
- Discovery site: Kitt Peak Obs.
- Discovery date: 18 November 1998 (first observed only)

Designations
- Minor planet category: TNO · cubewano (hot) distant · binary

Orbital characteristics
- Epoch 21 November 2025 (JD 2461000.5)
- Uncertainty parameter 4
- Observation arc: 26.12 yr (9,540 d)
- Aphelion: 48.550 AU
- Perihelion: 41.339 AU
- Semi-major axis: 44.944 AU
- Eccentricity: 0.08022
- Orbital period (sidereal): 301.31 yr (110,054 d)
- Mean anomaly: 146.197°
- Mean motion: 0° 0^{m} 11.776^{s} / day
- Inclination: 6.7795°
- Longitude of ascending node: 237.019°
- Argument of perihelion: 53.901°
- Known satellites: 1 (D: 123 km; P: 587 d)

Physical characteristics
- Mean diameter: 148 km (est. primary); 192.1 km (cal. system)
- Mass: (2.658±0.015)×10^{18} kg
- Geometric albedo: 0.04 (est.); 0.10 (assumed)
- Spectral type: blue C (assumed); V–I = 0.910±0.020
- Absolute magnitude (H): 6.5; 6.9

1998 WW_{31} is a non-resonant trans-Neptunian object and binary system from the Kuiper belt located in the outermost region of the Solar System, approximately 148 kilometers (92 miles) in diameter. It was first observed on 18 November 1998, by American astronomer Marc Buie and Robert Millis at the Kitt Peak National Observatory in Arizona, United States. In December 2000, a minor-planet moon, designated S/2000 (1998 WW_{31}) 1 with a diameter of 123 kilometers (76 miles), was discovered in its orbit. After Charon in 1978, it was the first of many satellites since discovered in the outer Solar System.

== Orbit and classification ==
Located beyond the orbit of Neptune, 1998 WW_{31} is a non-resonant classical Kuiper belt object (cubewano) of the so-called hot population, which have higher inclinations than those of the cold population. It orbits the Sun at a distance of 40.4–48.5 AU once every 297 years (108,345 days; semi-major axis of 44.48 AU). Its orbit has an eccentricity of 0.09 and an inclination of 7° with respect to the ecliptic. The body's observation arc begins at Kitt Peak with its first observation on 18 November 1998.

== Numbering and naming ==
As of 2025, this minor planet has not been numbered nor named by the Minor Planet Center.

== Physical characteristics ==
1998 WW_{31} is expected to have a low albedo due to its blue (neutral) color. Other sources assume a higher albedo of 0.10 and 0.16, respectively (see below). It has a V–I color index of 0.91, notably lower than the mean-color index for cubewanos, and in between that of comets and Jupiter trojans.

=== Satellite ===
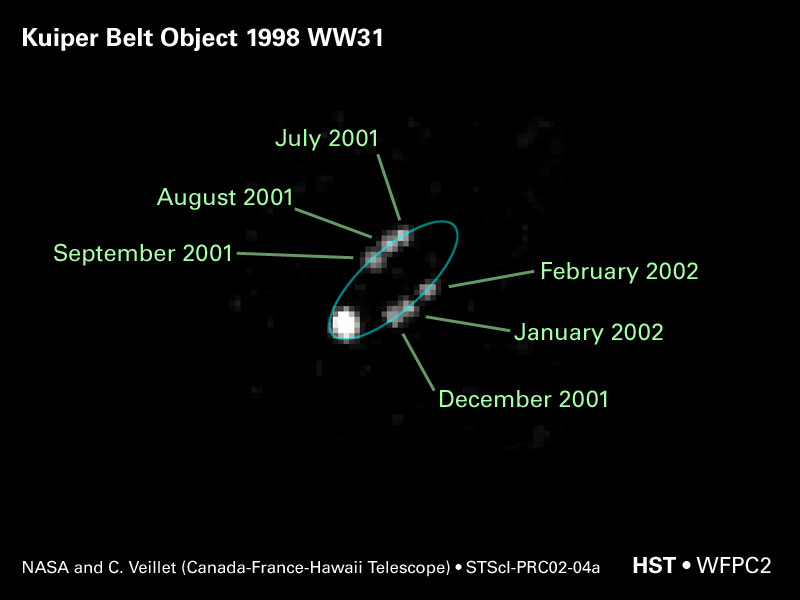
Hubble image composite from 2001 to 2002 of 1998 WW_{31} with its satellite on a long, 587-day orbit

Hubble Space Telescope timelapse of 1998 WW_{31}'s moon orbiting the parent body.

On 22 December 2000, French astronomers Christian Veillet and Alain Doressoundiram in collaboration with J. Shapiro discovered that the observed body was a binary, using the Canada–France–Hawaii Telescope at Mauna Kea on the Big Island of Hawaii, United States. The discovery was announced on 16 April 2001, and the smaller body received the provisional designation S/2000 (1998 WW_{31}) 1.

It was the first trans-Neptunian binary discovered after Charon in 1978, the largest satellite in the Pluto–Charon system. Since then, many trans-Neptunian binaries have been discovered. 1998 WW_{31} is also one of the most symmetrical binaries known in the Solar System.

The satellite has a highly eccentric orbit with an eccentricity of 0.8193±0.0020 with an exceptionally long orbital period of 587.27±0.18 d and a semi-major axis of 22617±42 km.

The discovery team concluded that, if the primary and secondary have the same albedo, their size ratio is 1.2, and if they also have the same densities, their mass ratio is 1.74 – that is, that the secondary has 60% the mass of the primary, or a bit over a third of the system mass. If they have equal densities of 1 g/cm^{3}, that would mean nominal diameters of 148 km and 123 km, respectively, and albedos of 0.05~0.06.

=== Diameter and albedo ===
Assuming a density of 1 g/cm^{3}, the primary measures 148 kilometres (92 mi), the satellite has a diameter of 123 kilometres (76 mi) (a ratio of 0.883) with a combined system diameter of 192 kilometres (119 mi). The Collaborative Asteroid Lightcurve Link assumes an albedo of 0.10 and calculates a system diameter of 192 kilometres (119 mi) based on an absolute magnitude of 6.7, while Mike Brown finds a diameter of 267 kilometres (166 mi) with a lower albedo of 0.04.

=== Rotation period ===
As of 2020, no rotational lightcurve of 1998 WW_{31} has been obtained from photometric observations. The body's rotation period, pole and shape remain unknown.
