= (91133) 1998 HK151 =

Plutino

(91133) 1998 HK_{151}
Discovery
- Discovered by: Mauna Kea Observatory
- Discovery date: 28 April 1998

Designations
- Minor planet category: plutino (TNO)

Orbital characteristics
- Epoch 9 June 2026 (JD 2461200.5)
- Uncertainty parameter 4
- Observation arc: 1178 days (3.23 yr)
- Aphelion: 48.05 AU
- Perihelion: 30.33 AU
- Semi-major axis: 39.19 AU
- Eccentricity: 0.2261
- Orbital period (sidereal): 245.3 yr (89605 d)
- Mean anomaly: 40.99°
- Mean motion: 0° 0^{m} 14.327^{s} / day
- Inclination: 5.945°
- Longitude of ascending node: 50.279°
- Argument of perihelion: 180.05°
- Uranus MOID: 11.4 AU (1.71 billion km)
- Neptune MOID: 0.18 AU (26.9 million km) (Note: A strong 3:2 resonance with Neptune prevents 1998 HK_{151} from getting this close.)

Physical characteristics
- Dimensions: 134 km (Johnston's archive)
- Geometric albedo: 0.09 (assumed)
- Spectral type: (Blueish; lowest TNO B-V) B-V=0.51; V-R=0.43
- Absolute magnitude (H): 7.6

(91133) 1998 HK_{151} is a resonant trans-Neptunian object from the Kuiper belt, located in the outer region of the Solar System. It is a plutino. It measures approximately 134 kilometers in diameter. It was discovered by astronomers at the Mauna Kea Observatory on 28 April 1998.

== Description ==
1998 HK_{151} is classified as a plutino, a dynamical group named after Pluto. Members of this group stay in a 2:3 resonance with Neptune.

1998 HK_{151} has the lowest, and thus bluest measured B-V color index of any TNO. On 24 May 2000, 1998 HK_{151} set a TNO record low B-V of 0.51. Reddening of the spectrum is caused by ultraviolet radiation and charged particles. Becoming bluer in the spectrum is caused by impact collisions exposing the interior of an object.

Based on an absolute magnitude of 7.62, Johnston's Archive estimates a diameter of 134 kilometers, assuming an albedo of 0.09.

Though it has a Neptune MOID of 0.18 AU (26.9 million km), it can not get that close to Neptune because of the 3:2 resonance with Neptune.

Neptune MOID at different epochs
| Epoch | Neptune MOID |
|---|---|
| 2022-01-21 | 0.32 AU (47.9 million km) |
| 2026-06-09 | 0.18 AU (26.9 million km) |

(33340) 1998 VG44 also has a small Neptune MOID.
