= (275809) 2001 QY297 =

Trans-Neptunian object

(275809) 2001 QY_{297}
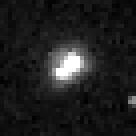
- Hubble Space Telescope image of 2001 QY_{297} and its satellite, taken in 2006

Discovery
- Discovered by: Marc Buie
- Discovery date: 21 August 2001

Designations
- Designation: (275809) 2001 QY_{297}
- Minor planet category: TNO · cubewano cold

Orbital characteristics
- Epoch 13 January 2013 (JD 2454100.5)
- Aphelion: 47.380 AU
- Perihelion: 40.013 AU
- Semi-major axis: 43.697 AU
- Eccentricity: 0.084
- Orbital period (sidereal): 288.86 a
- Mean anomaly: 84.415°
- Inclination: 1.548°
- Longitude of ascending node: 108.776°
- Argument of perihelion: 123.591°
- Known satellites: 1 (D: 154+15 −73 km

Physical characteristics
- Mean diameter: 229+22 −108 km (effective); 169+16 −80 km (primary)
- Mass: (4.105±0.038)×10^{18} kg
- Mean density: 0.92+1.30 −0.27 g/cm^{3} (Note: Assuming that both components have equal albedos and equal densities)
- Synodic rotation period: 11.68 h
- Albedo: 0.152+0.439 −0.035
- Spectral type: V−R = 0.43±0.09; B−V = 0.7
- Absolute magnitude (H): 5.86±0.31

(275809) 2001 QY_{297} is a trans-Neptunian object from the classical Kuiper belt, located in the outermost region of the Solar System. The binary classical Kuiper belt object belongs to the cold population.

== Discovery and orbit ==
2001 QY_{297} was discovered on 21 August 2001 by Marc William Buie from Cerro Tololo Observatory, La Serena, Chile. 2001 QY_{297} belongs to the dynamically cold population of the classical Kuiper belt objects, which have small orbital eccentricities and inclinations. Their semi-major axes reside mainly in the interval 40–45 AU.

== Satellite ==
2001 QY_{297} is a binary system consisting of two components of approximately equal size. The satellite was discovered on 18 April 2006. Assuming that both components have the same albedo, the primary is estimated to be about 169 km in diameter. The size of the secondary (satellite) in this case is estimated at around 154 km. The total mass of the system is approximately 4×10^{18} kg. The average density of both components is about 1 g/cm^{3}.

Orbital parameters of the (275809) 2001 QY_{297} system
Semi-major axis (km)	Eccentricity	Period (d)	Inclination (°)
9960 ± 31	0.4175 ± 0.0023	138.110 ± 0.023	172.86 ± 0.20

== Physical characteristics ==
The surfaces of both components of 2001 QY_{297} appear to have a red color. The object shows significant photometric variability with lightcurve amplitude of 0.49±0.03. The rotational period is either 5.84 or 11.68 hours.
