= (85633) 1998 KR65 =

Cubewano

(85633) 1998 KR_{65}
Discovery
- Discovered by: Gary M. Bernstein
- Discovery date: 29 May 1998

Designations
- Minor planet category: TNO · cubewano cold

Orbital characteristics
- Epoch 13 January 2016 (JD 2457400.5)
- Uncertainty parameter 3
- Observation arc: 3289 days (9.00 yr)
- Aphelion: 44.719 AU (6.6899 Tm)
- Perihelion: 41.986 AU (6.2810 Tm)
- Semi-major axis: 43.352 AU (6.4854 Tm)
- Eccentricity: 0.031514
- Orbital period (sidereal): 285.45 yr (104260 d)
- Mean anomaly: 247.48°
- Mean motion: 0° 0^{m} 12.43^{s} / day
- Inclination: 1.1903°
- Longitude of ascending node: 101.95°
- Argument of perihelion: 338.56°

Physical characteristics
- Mean diameter: 192 km
- Geometric albedo: 0.09 (assumed)
- Absolute magnitude (H): 6.7

(85633) 1998 KR_{65} is a trans-Neptunian object from the classical Kuiper belt, located in the outermost region of the Solar System. The cubewano belongs to the cold population. It has a perihelion (closest approach to the Sun) at 42.385 AU and an aphelion (farthest approach from the Sun) at 44.859 AU. It is about 192 km in diameter. It was discovered on 29 May 1998, by Gary M. Bernstein.
