= Deep Ecliptic Survey =

Astronomy project

Minor planets discovered: 9
| 19521 Chaos | 19 November 1998 | list |
| 28978 Ixion | 22 May 2001 | list |
| 38083 Rhadamanthus | 17 April 1999 | list |
| (42301) 2001 UR163 | 21 October 2001 | list |
| 53311 Deucalion | 18 April 1999 | list |
| 54598 Bienor | 27 August 2000 | list |
| 88611 Teharonhiawako | 20 August 2001 | list |
| 148780 Altjira | 20 October 2001 | list |
| (361701) 2007 VZ171 | 24 November 2003 | list |

The Deep Ecliptic Survey (DES) is a project to find Kuiper belt objects (KBOs), using the facilities of the National Optical Astronomy Observatory (NOAO). The principal investigator is Robert L. Millis.

Since 1998 through the end of 2003, the survey covered 550 square degrees with sensitivity of 22.5, which means an estimated 50% of objects of this magnitude have been found.

The survey has also established the mean Kuiper Belt plane and introduced new formal definitions of the dynamical classes of Kuiper belt objects.

The remarkable first observations and/or discoveries include:

- 28978 Ixion, large plutino
- 19521 Chaos (cubewano)
- 1998 WW31, the first binary trans-Neptunian object (TNO)
- (148209) 2000 CR105, the first object with perihelion too far to be affected (scattered) by Neptune and a large semi-major axis
- (87269) 2000 OO67, remarkable for its semi-major axis of more than 500 AU and extreme eccentricity (0.96) taking the object from the inside of the Neptune's orbit to more than 1000 AU
- 2001 QR322, the first Neptune trojan
- 2002 XU93, with one of the most inclined orbits (>68°)
