= 53311 Deucalion =

Cold classical Kuiper belt object

- Animation of the orbit of Deucalion relative to the inner planets. It takes 296 Earth-years to complete a single orbit.

Discovery
- Discovered by: DES
- Discovery site: Kitt Peak National Obs.
- Discovery date: 18 April 1999

Designations
- Pronunciation: /djuːˈkeɪliən, -ɒn/
- Named after: Δευκαλίων Deukălĭōn (Greek mythology)
- Alternative designations: 1999 HU_{11}
- Minor planet category: TNO · cubewano cold
- Adjectives: Deucalionean; Deucalionian /djuːkæliˈoʊniən/

Orbital characteristics
- Epoch 27 April 2019 (JD 2458600.5)
- Uncertainty parameter 4 · 3
- Observation arc: 15.04 yr (5,492 d)
- Aphelion: 47.371 AU
- Perihelion: 41.419 AU
- Semi-major axis: 44.395 AU
- Eccentricity: 0.0670
- Orbital period (sidereal): 295.81 yr (108,044 d)
- Mean anomaly: 307.41°
- Mean motion: 0° 0^{m} 11.88^{s} / day
- Inclination: 0.3720°
- Longitude of ascending node: 51.363°
- Argument of perihelion: 237.36°

Physical characteristics
- Mean diameter: 131 km (est.); 212 km (est.)
- Geometric albedo: 0.09 (assumed); 0.20 (assumed)
- Absolute magnitude (H): 6.6

53311 Deucalion (provisional designation 1999 HU_{11}) is a trans-Neptunian object from the classical Kuiper belt, with a diameter of approximately 130–210 kilometers (81–130 miles), located in the outermost region of the Solar System. The cubewano belongs to the cold population and was discovered on 18 April 1999, by the Deep Ecliptic Survey at the Kitt Peak National Observatory in Arizona, United States. It was named after Deucalion, from Greek mythology.

== Orbit and classification ==
Deucalion orbits the Sun at a distance of 41.4–47.4 AU once every 295 years and 10 months (108,044 days; semi-major axis of 44.4 AU). Its orbit has an eccentricity of 0.07 and an inclination of 0° with respect to the ecliptic. The body's observation arc begins six days prior to its official discovery observation in April 1999.

It is a cubewano from the classical Kuiper belt, located in between the resonant plutino and twotino populations and has a low-eccentricity orbit. With its very small inclination (0.3°), significantly less than 4–7°, the object belongs to the cold population rather than the "stirred" hot population.

== Naming ==
This minor planet was named from Greek mythology after Deucalion, son of Prometheus. He and his wife Pyrrha were the only ones that survived the great deluge ("the flood of Deucalion") brought upon all humans by Zeus. The official naming citation was published by the Minor Planet Center on 14 June 2003 (M.P.C. 49102).

== Physical characteristics ==
Johnston's Archive estimates a diameter of 212 kilometers based on an assumed albedo of 0.09, while American astronomer Michael Brown, calculates a diameter of 131 kilometers, using an estimated albedo of 0.20 and an absolute magnitude of 6.6.

As of 2018, no spectral type and color indices, nor a rotational lightcurve have been obtained from spectroscopic and photometric observations. The body's color, rotation period, pole and shape remain unknown.
