= 38083 Rhadamanthus =

Trans-Neptunian object

Discovery
- Discovered by: Deep Ecliptic Survey
- Discovery date: 17 April 1999

Designations
- Pronunciation: /rædəˈmænθəs/
- Named after: Rhadamanthus
- Alternative designations: 1999 HX_{11}
- Minor planet category: TNO
- Adjectives: Rhadamanthean, Rhadamanthian /rædəˈmænθiən/
- Symbol: (astrological)

Orbital characteristics
- Epoch 20 November 2017 (JD 2458078)
- Uncertainty parameter 3
- Observation arc: 5110 days (13.99 yr)
- Aphelion: 45.139 AU (6.7527 Tm)
- Perihelion: 32.782 AU (4.9041 Tm)
- Semi-major axis: 38.777 AU (5.8010 Tm)
- Eccentricity: 0.1546
- Orbital period (sidereal): 241.47 yr (88197.3 d)
- Average orbital speed: 4.73 km/s
- Mean anomaly: 97.148°
- Mean motion: 0° 0^{m} 14.46^{s} / day
- Inclination: 12.793°
- Longitude of ascending node: 9.9615°
- Argument of perihelion: 82.178°
- Known satellites: 0
- Earth MOID: 32.2253 AU (4.82084 Tm)
- Jupiter MOID: 28.1835 AU (4.21619 Tm)
- T_{Jupiter}: 5.424

Physical characteristics
- Dimensions: 87–276 km
- Temperature: ~ 44 K
- Spectral type: B–V = 0.650±0.085; V–R = 0.527±0.069
- Absolute magnitude (H): 6.81

38083 Rhadamanthus (/rædəˈmænθəs/, provisional designation 1999 HX_{11}) is a trans-Neptunian object (TNO). It was discovered in 1999 by the Deep Ecliptic Survey. It was originally mistakenly thought to be a plutino.

== Discovery and naming ==
Rhadamanthus was discovered on 17 April 1999 by the Deep Ecliptic Survey.

Rhadamanthus is named after the Greek mythological figure. The name was announced in the circular of the Minor Planet Center of 24 July 2002, which stated "Rhadamanthus was a son of Zeus and Europa. Because of his just and upright life, after death he was appointed a judge of the dead and the ruler of Elysium, a blissfully beautiful area of the Underworld where those favored by the gods spent their life after death. The name was suggested by E. K. Elliot."

Planetary symbols are no longer much used in astronomy, so Rhadamanthus never received a symbol in the astronomical literature. There is no standard symbol for Rhadamanthus used by astrologers either. A Unicode proposal for dwarf planet symbols notes a symbol that has been used, but leaves it unexplained.
