= 55565 Aya =

Classical Kuiper belt object

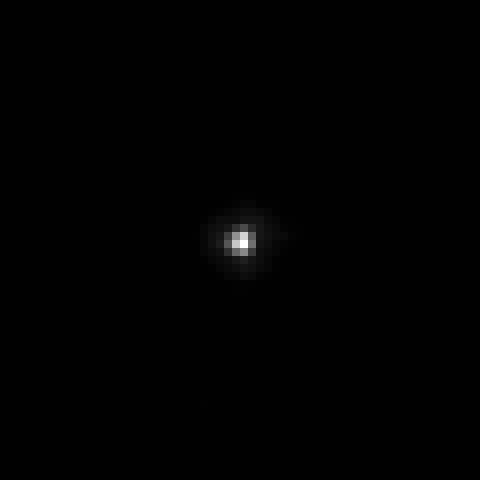
- Hubble Space Telescope image of Aya taken in December 2005

Discovery
- Discovered by: Palomar Obs. (Note: The Minor Planet Center lists "Palomar" as the discoverer without listing specific people.)
- Discovery site: Palomar Obs.
- Discovery date: 10 January 2002

Designations
- Pronunciation: /ˈaɪə/
- Named after: Aya
- Alternative designations: 2002 AW_{197}
- Minor planet category: TNO · classical (hot) distant · Scat-Ext

Orbital characteristics (barycentric)
- Epoch 25 February 2023 (JD 2460000.5)
- Uncertainty parameter 2
- Observation arc: 27.15 yr (9,915 d)
- Earliest precovery date: 29 December 1997
- Aphelion: 53.280 AU
- Perihelion: 41.112 AU
- Semi-major axis: 47.196 AU
- Eccentricity: 0.1289
- Orbital period (sidereal): 324.02 yr (118,349 d)
- Mean anomaly: 299.003°
- Mean motion: 0° 0^{m} 10.951^{s} / day
- Inclination: 24.382°
- Longitude of ascending node: 297.481°
- Time of perihelion: ≈ 5 May 2078 ±0.4 days
- Argument of perihelion: 295.928°
- Known satellites: 0
- Neptune MOID: 13.5 AU (2.02 billion km)

Physical characteristics
- Mean diameter: 802+56 −80 km
- Synodic rotation period: 8.86±0.01 h 8.78 h
- Geometric albedo: 0.101+0.023 −0.013
- Spectral type: IR (moderately red); B–V = 0.920±0.020; V–R = 0.560±0.020
- Apparent magnitude: 20.0
- Absolute magnitude (H): 3.593±0.023

55565 Aya (provisional designation 2002 AW_{197}) is a large trans-Neptunian object in the classical Kuiper belt. It was discovered on 10 January 2002 by astronomers at Palomar Observatory.

Aya is around 800 km (500 mi) in diameter, with no rings or atmosphere beyond 90 nanobars of pressure. It has a rotation period of 8.8 hours and has a moderately red color. The object's brightness does not significantly vary as it rotates, which indicates it is likely spheroidal.

== History ==
=== Discovery ===
Aya was discovered on 10 January 2002, by astronomers at Palomar Observatory in San Diego County, California, United States. Astronomers involved in the discovery were Michael Brown, Chad Trujillo, Eleanor Helin, Michael Hicks, Kenneth Lawrence and Steven Pravdo. The object was discovered during Brown and Trujillo's Caltech Wide Area Sky Survey, which used Palomar Observatory's 1.22-meter (48 in) Samuel Oschin telescope to search for bright Kuiper belt objects. This survey, which was operated jointly with the nightly Near Earth Asteroid Tracking (NEAT) program at Palomar, would later discover several other large objects beyond Neptune, including the dwarf planets Eris, Sedna, and Quaoar.

Aya was found through manual vetting of potential moving objects identified by Brown and Trujillo's automatic image-searching software. In terms of absolute magnitude, Aya was the second-brightest Kuiper belt object known at the time. It was detected at a red-filter apparent magnitude of 19.7. Aya was further observed by Trujillo and Brown using telescopes at Palomar and Mauna Kea Observatory during February to April 2002. The discovery was announced by the Minor Planet Center on 20 July 2002 and the object was given the minor planet provisional designation of 2002 AW_{197}.

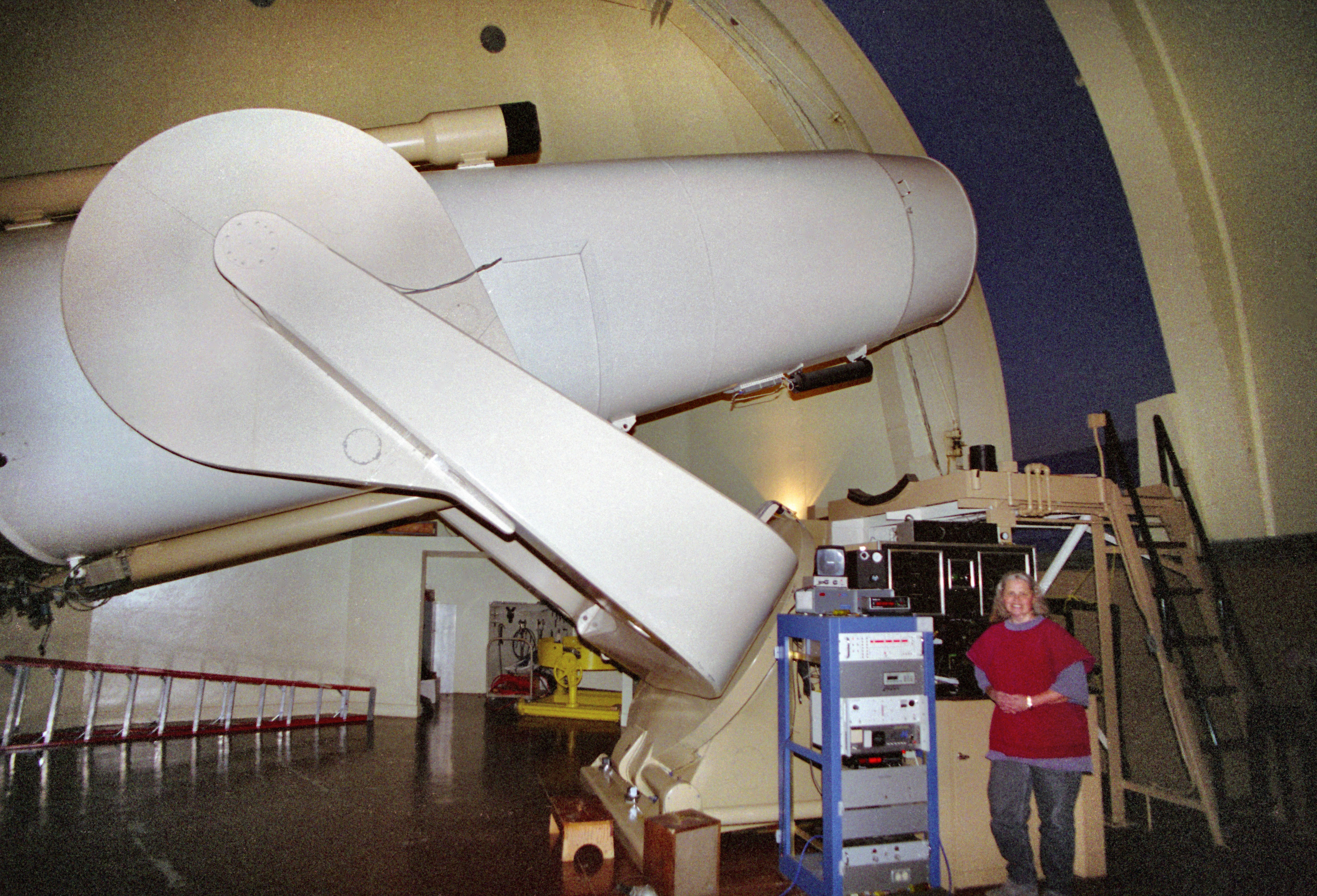
The 1.2-meter Samuel Oschin telescope that was used to discover Aya at Palomar Observatory

Discovery images of Aya from 10 January 2002

=== Further observations ===
Within a month after Aya's discovery, Trujillo and Brown collaborated with Jean-Luc Margot and Frank Bertoldi to measure the object's diameter and thermal emission using the IRAM 30m radio telescope at Sierra Nevada, Spain. Astronomers also found additional observations of Aya from the time before and during its discovery, which allowed for further refinement of orbit calculations. The earliest pre-discovery observation of Aya comes from an image taken on 29 December 1997 by the NEAT/GEODSS program at Haleakalā Observatory, Hawaii. As of 2025, Aya has been observed for over 27 years, or about 8% of its orbital period.

=== Numbering and naming ===
The object received its permanent minor planet catalog number of 55565 from the Minor Planet Center on 16 February 2003. On 30 June 2025, it was given the name Aya, after the goddess of dawn and the wife of the sun god Shamash in Akkadian mythology.

== Orbit and classification ==
Diagram showing Aya's inclined orbit relative to other planets in the Solar System

Aya is a trans-Neptunian object (TNO) orbiting the Sun at a semi-major axis or average distance of 47.2 astronomical units (AU). (Note: These orbital elements are expressed in terms of the Solar System Barycenter (SSB) as the frame of reference. Due to planetary perturbations, the Sun revolves around the SSB at non-negligible distances, so heliocentric-frame orbital elements and distances can vary in short timescales as shown in JPL-Horizons.) It follows an elliptical orbit with an eccentricity of 0.13. During its 324-year orbital period, Aya comes within 41.1 AU from the Sun at perihelion and up to 53.3 AU at aphelion. It has an orbital inclination of 24.4° with respect to the ecliptic. Aya last passed perihelion in July 1753 and will make its next perihelion passage in May 2078.

Aya is located in the classical region of the Kuiper belt 39–48 AU from the Sun, and is thus classified as a classical Kuiper belt object (or sometimes a "cubewano"). Aya's high orbital inclination qualifies it as a dynamically "hot" member of the classical Kuiper belt, which implies that it was gravitationally scattered out to its present location by Neptune's outward planetary migration in the Solar System's early history. Hence, Aya is sometimes classified as a "scattered" object.

=== Orbital stability ===
In a 2021 study by Muñoz-Gutiérrez et al., they simulate the orbital stability of 34 large trans-Neptunian objects over 1 billion years (1 Gyr). Over 1 Gyr, Aya's orbit is "Stable", and its diffusion time is 21.933 Gyr, making it "Very Stable".

== Physical characteristics ==
History of diameter estimates for Aya
Year of Publication	Diameter (km)	Method	Refs
2002	886+115 −131	thermal (IRAM)	
2005	700±50	thermal (Spitzer)	
2008	734.6+116.4 −108.3	thermal (Spitzer)	
2009	742+98 −104	thermal (Spitzer, remodeled)	
2014	768+39 −38	thermal (Herschel + Spitzer)	
2026	802+56 −80 km	occultation	

=== Size, shape, and rotation ===
Comparison of sizes, albedos, and colors of various large trans-Neptunian objects with diameters greater than 700 km (430 mi). Aya is shown on the middle row, first from the right. The light and dark colored arcs represent uncertainties of the object's size.

A single stellar occultation observation from 2024 has shown that Aya is 802+56
−80 km (498+35
−50 mi) in diameter, making it slightly smaller than the dwarf planet Ceres but still one of the largest known TNOs. Previous estimates of Aya's diameter from its infrared thermal emission had determined a slightly smaller diameter of 768+39
−38 km (477+24
−24 mi), though the uncertainties still make this estimate compatible with the current one. Aya is large enough that some astronomers consider it a dwarf planet candidate. Aya's brightness fluctuates very little as it rotates, which could indicate it has a spheroidal shape. Aya likely has a rotation period of around 8.8 hours, according to telescopic observations of its brightness changes over time. Aya's subtle brightness variations can make it difficult to determine its light curve and true rotation period. The first measurements of Aya's rotation period made during 2002–2003 obtained a likely period of 8.86±0.01 hours. Although other alias periods of 13.94, 6.49, and 15.82 hours are possible, the 8.86 hour period stands out as the most likely. Observations from 2003–2004 obtained a period of 8.78 hours, whereas another set of observations from 2003 could not determine a period.

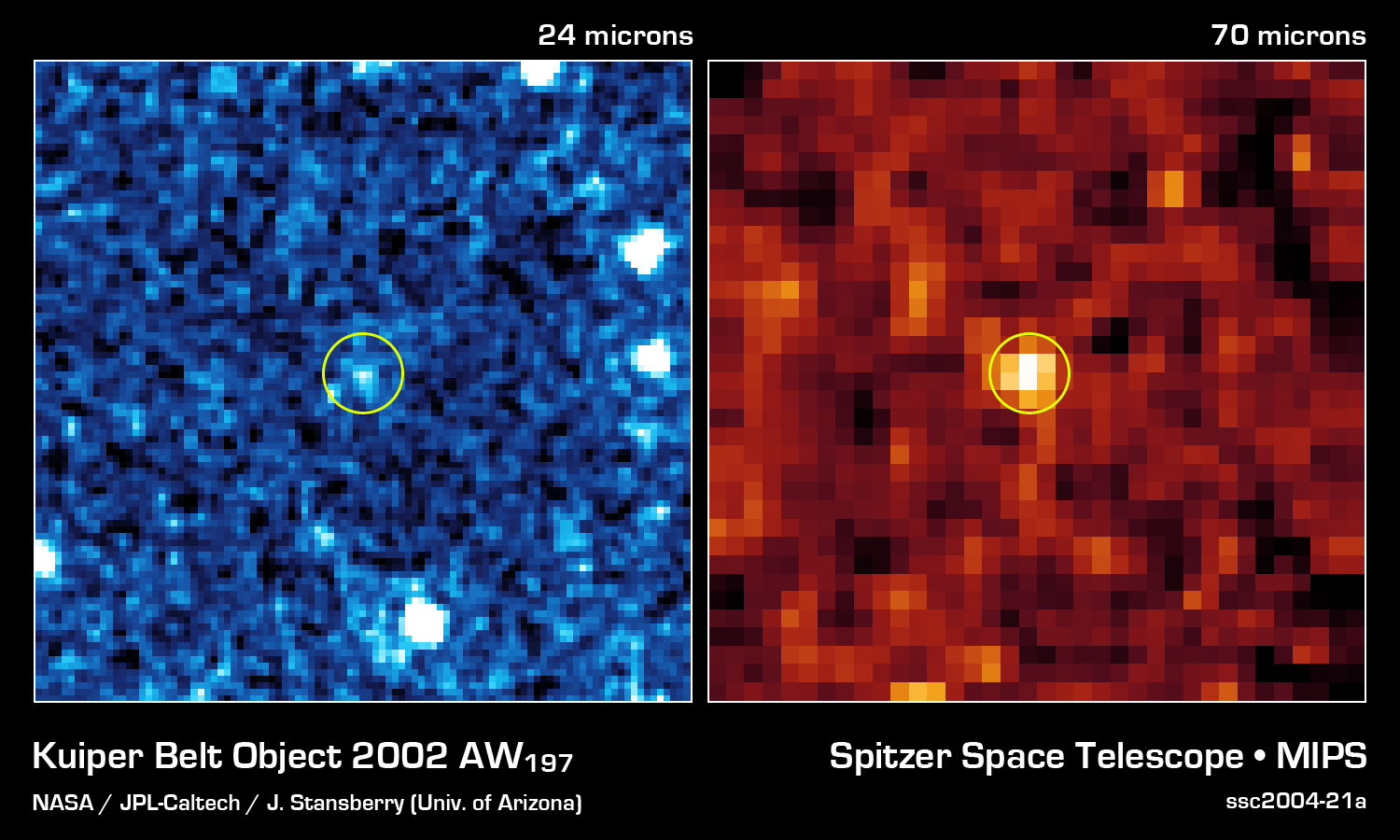
Pair of far-infrared images of Aya by the Spitzer Space Telescope

=== Surface ===
Aya has a dark, reddish surface with a geometric albedo of about 10%. The visible and near-infrared spectrum of Aya lacks obvious absorption features, which suggests that tholins mostly cover its surface.

=== No atmosphere and rings ===
A single stellar occultation observation from 2024 found no signs of a thick atmosphere nor rings within 430–8060 km of Aya. If Aya has an atmosphere made of either pure methane, nitrogen, or carbon monoxide, its surface atmospheric pressure must be less than 60, 90, or 80 nanobars, respectively. If Aya has rings, they must be too thin (opacity <0.1, radial widths less than a few kilometres) to be detected.

== See also ==
- 174567 Varda – a similar TNO by orbit, size and color
- List of Solar System objects by size
