= (85627) 1998 HP151 =

Cubewano

(85627) 1998 HP_{151}
Discovery
- Discovered by: Mauna Kea Observatory
- Discovery date: 28 April 1998

Designations
- Minor planet category: TNO · cubewano cold

Orbital characteristics
- Epoch 13 January 2016 (JD 2457400.5)
- Uncertainty parameter 3
- Observation arc: 3302 days (9.04 yr)
- Aphelion: 47.92187 AU (7.169010 Tm)
- Perihelion: 40.25486 AU (6.022041 Tm)
- Semi-major axis: 44.08836 AU (6.595525 Tm)
- Eccentricity: 0.086951
- Orbital period (sidereal): 292.75 yr (106926 d)
- Average orbital speed: 4.47 km/s
- Mean anomaly: 315.815°
- Mean motion: 0° 0^{m} 12.121^{s} / day
- Inclination: 1.51240°
- Longitude of ascending node: 55.9363°
- Argument of perihelion: 249.275°

Physical characteristics
- Mean diameter: 146 km
- Absolute magnitude (H): 7.4

(85627) 1998 HP_{151} is a trans-Neptunian object from the classical Kuiper belt, located in the outermost region of the Solar System. The cubewano belongs to the cold population. It has a perihelion (closest approach to the Sun) at 40.297 AU and an aphelion (farthest approach from the Sun) of 48.306 AU. It is about 146 km in diameter. It was discovered on 28 April 1998, at the Mauna Kea Observatory, Hawaii.
