= 19521 Chaos =

Classical Kuiper belt object

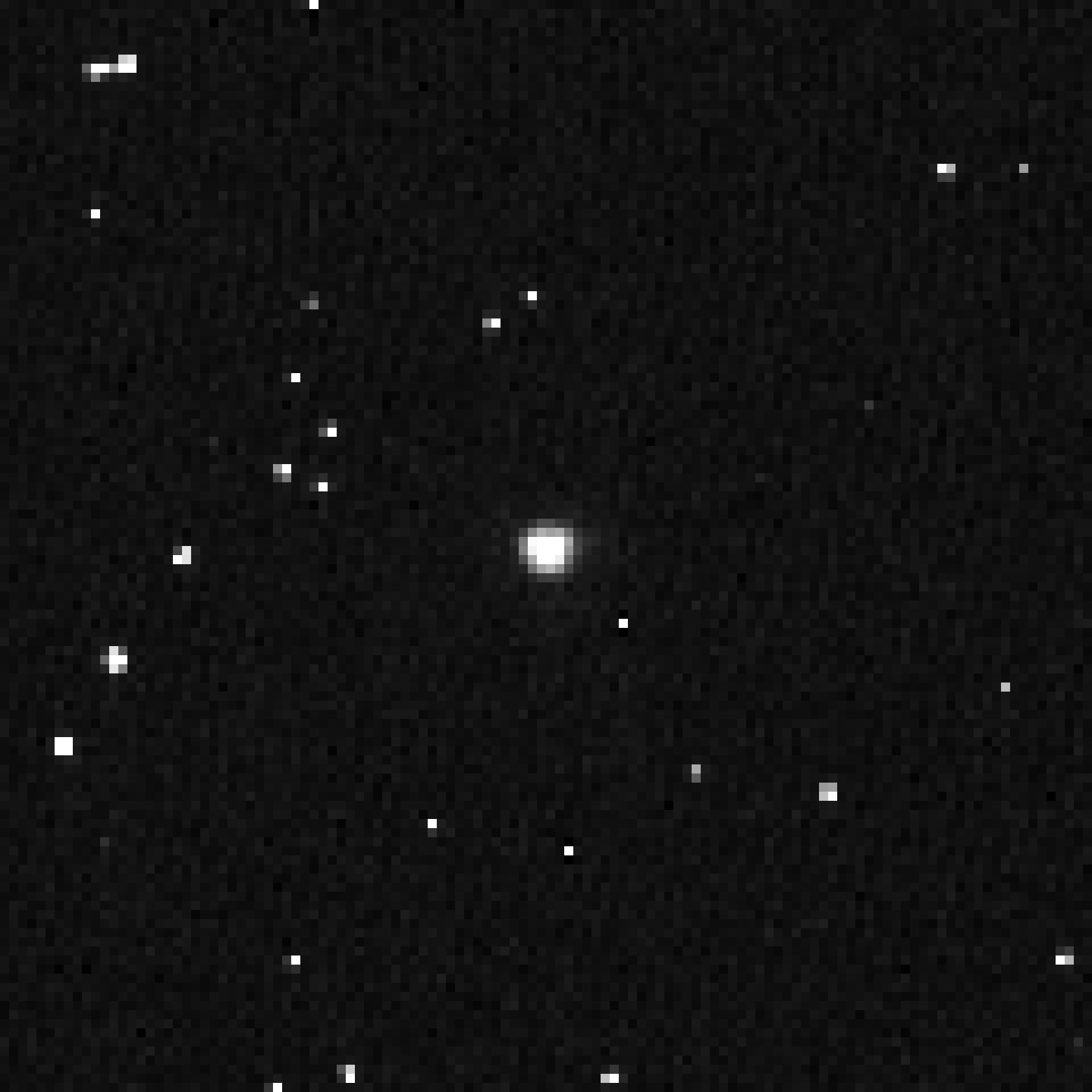
- 19521 Chaos as imaged by the Hubble Space Telescope in September 2001

Discovery
- Discovered by: Deep Ecliptic Survey
- Discovery date: 19 November 1998

Designations
- Pronunciation: /ˈkeɪ.ɒs/
- Named after: Chaos
- Alternative designations: 1998 WH_{24}
- Minor planet category: TNO (cubewano)
- Adjectives: Chaotian /keɪˈoʊʃən/
- Symbol: (astrological)

Orbital characteristics
- Epoch 13 January 2016 (JD 2457400.5)
- Uncertainty parameter 2
- Observation arc: 5902 days (16.16 yr)
- Earliest precovery date: 17 October 1991
- Aphelion: 50.636 AU (7.5750 Tm)
- Perihelion: 40.957 AU (6.1271 Tm)
- Semi-major axis: 45.796 AU (6.8510 Tm)
- Eccentricity: 0.10567
- Orbital period (sidereal): 309.92 yr (113199 d)
- Average orbital speed: 4.3931 km/s
- Mean anomaly: 337.2998°
- Mean motion: 0° 0^{m} 11.449^{s} / day
- Inclination: 12.0502°
- Longitude of ascending node: 50.0239°
- Time of perihelion: ≈ 22 December 2033 ±3 days
- Argument of perihelion: 58.4097°
- Known satellites: 1? (compact or contact binary)
- Jupiter MOID: 35.8 AU (5.36 Tm)
- Neptune MOID: 12.5 AU (1.87 Tm)
- T_{Jupiter}: 5.884

Physical characteristics
- Dimensions: 415+83 −30 km equivalent 600+140 −130 km ~665
- Geometric albedo: 0.1 (calculated)
- Spectral type: B–V=0.95±0.03; V–R=0.63±0.03; V–I=1.25±0.04
- Absolute magnitude (H): 4.64; 5.0

19521 Chaos (provisional designation 1998 WH_{24}) is a cubewano, a Kuiper belt object not in resonance with any planet. Chaos was discovered in 1998 by the Deep Ecliptic Survey with Kitt Peak's 4 m (13 ft) telescope.

Occultations suggest it is a compact or contact binary equivalent to a sphere 400 to 500 km (250 to 310 mi) in diameter. On 20 November 2020, Chaos occulted a magnitude 16.8 star. Three observers detected the occultation, finding that the object is likely smaller than 600 km (370 mi) in diameter. Another occultation was recorded on 14 January 2022; full results on size, shape, geometric albedo, and the spin-axis orientation have not been released. A further occultation occurred on 28 September 2023, with a shadow crossing most of North America. This occultation was observed by over 30 observers; preliminary analysis suggests that Chaos is a binary (possibly a contact binary).

== Name ==
On 28 March 2002, it was named after the primeval state of existence in Greek mythology, from which the first gods appeared.

Planetary symbols are no longer much used in astronomy, so Chaos never received a symbol in the astronomical literature. There is no standard symbol for Chaos used by astrologers either. Michael Moorcock's Symbol of Chaos has occasionally been used.

== Orbit ==
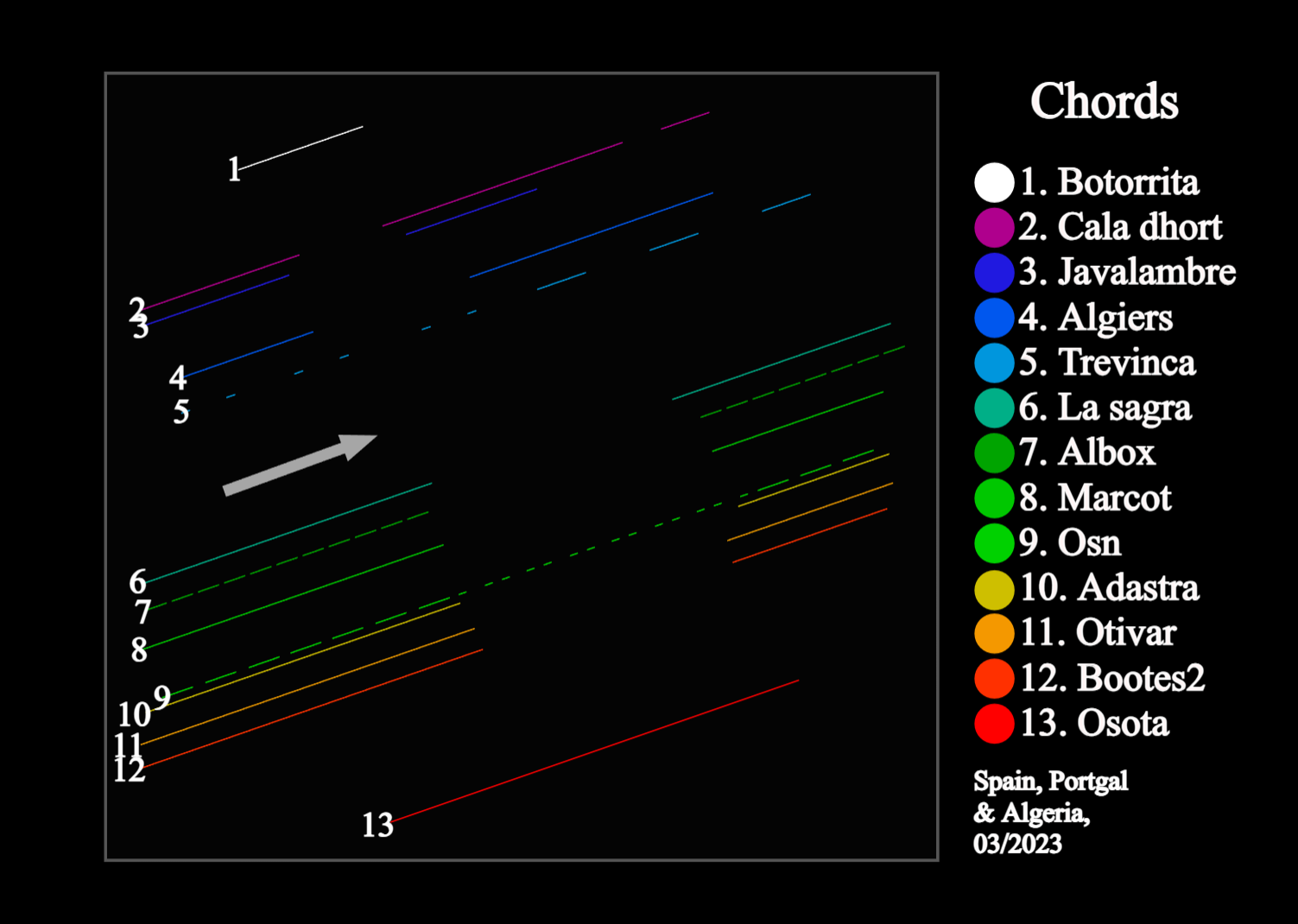
A recreation of the 2023 occultation.

Chaos has an orbital period of approximately 309 years. Its orbit is longer, but less eccentric than the orbit of Pluto. Chaos's orbit is inclined approximately 12° to the ecliptic. Its orbit never crosses the orbit of Neptune. Currently, the closest approach possible to Neptune (MOID) is 12.5 AU (1.87 billion km; 1.16 billion mi).

Chaos will come to perihelion around 22 December 2033, coming as close as 40 AU (5.98 billion km; 3.72 billion mi) from Earth. Its brightest magnitude will be 20.8.

The orbit of 19521 Chaos
