= Precovery =

Process of finding the image of an object in images predating its discovery

Jupiter's moon Valetudo was discovered in 2016, but a number of precovery images have been identified since, including this series taken on 28 February 2003 by the Canada–France–Hawaii Telescope, in which Valetudo's position is marked by the two orange bars.

In astronomy, precovery (short for pre-discovery recovery) is the process of finding the image of a celestial object in images or photographic plates predating its discovery, typically for the purpose of calculating a more accurate orbit. This happens most often with minor planets, but sometimes a comet, a dwarf planet, a natural satellite, or a star is found in old archived images; even exoplanet precovery observations have been obtained. "Precovery" refers to a pre-discovery image; "recovery" refers to imaging of a body which was lost to our view (as behind the Sun), but has become visible again (also see lost minor planet and lost comet).

Orbit determination requires measuring an object's position on multiple occasions. The longer the interval between observations, the more accurately the orbit can be calculated; however, for a newly discovered object, only a few days' or weeks' worth of measured positions may be available, sufficient only for a preliminary (imprecise) orbit calculation.

When an object is of particular interest (such as asteroids with a chance of impacting Earth), researchers begin a search for precovery images. Using the preliminary orbit calculation to predict where the object might appear on old archival images, those images (sometimes decades old) are searched to see if it had in fact already been photographed. If so, a far longer observation arc can allow a far more precise orbital calculation.

Until fast computers were widely available, it was impractical to analyze and measure images for possible minor planet discoveries because this required much human labor. Usually, such images were made years or decades earlier for other purposes (studies of galaxies, etc.), and it was not worth the time it took to look for precovery images of ordinary asteroids. Today, computers can easily analyze digital astronomical images and compare them to star catalogs containing up to a billion or so star positions to see if one of the "stars" is actually a precovery image of the newly discovered object. This technique has been used since the mid-1990s to determine the orbits of many minor planets.

== Examples ==
In an extreme case of precovery, an object was discovered on December 31, 2000, designated 2000 YK66, and a near-Earth orbit was calculated. Precovery revealed that it had previously been discovered on February 23, 1950, and given the provisional designation 1950 DA, and then been lost for half a century. The exceptionally long observation period allowed an unusually precise orbit calculation, and the asteroid was determined to have a small chance of colliding with Earth. After an asteroid's orbit is calculated with sufficient precision, it can be assigned a number prefix (in this case, (29075) 1950 DA).

The asteroid 69230 Hermes was found in 2003 and numbered, but was found to be a discovery from 1937 which had been named "Hermes", but subsequently lost; its old name was reinstated. Centaur 2060 Chiron was discovered in 1977, and precovery images from 1895 have been located.

Another noteworthy case of precovery concerns Neptune. Galileo observed Neptune on both December 28, 1612, and January 27, 1613, when it was in a portion of its orbit where it was nearly directly behind Jupiter as seen from Earth. Because Neptune moves very slowly and is very faint relative to the known planets of that time, Galileo mistook it for a fixed star, leaving the planet undiscovered until 1846. He did note that the "star" Neptune did seem to move, noting that between his two observations its apparent distance from another star had changed. However, unlike photographic images, drawings such as those Galileo made are usually not precise enough to be of use in refining an object's orbit. In 1795, Lalande also mistook Neptune for a star. In 1690, John Flamsteed did the same with Uranus, even cataloging it as "34 Tauri".

One of the most exceptional suggested instances is related to the discovery of Ganymede. This again involved Galileo, who is usually stated to have discovered it in 1610. It has been postulated by Xi Zezong that Ganymede was discovered by the Chinese astronomer Gan De in 365 B.C., when he catalogued it as a small red star next to Jupiter during naked eye observation.

=== Dwarf planets ===
Discovery and precovery dates for well-known dwarf planets, minor planets and probable dwarf planets:

Index	Object	Discovery year	Precovery year	Years elapsed	Absolute magnitude
2	Pallas	1802	1779	23	4.13
134340	Pluto	1930	1909	21	-0.7
19521	Chaos	1998	1991	7	5.0
20000	Varuna	2000	1954	46	3.76
38628	Huya	2000	1996	4	5.04
78799	Xewioso	2002	1989	13	5.5
28978	Ixion	2001	1982	19	3.6
55637	Uni	2002	1991	11	3.87
50000	Quaoar	2002	1954	48	2.82
307261	Máni	2002	1954	48	3.7
55565	Aya	2002	1997	5	3.5
612533	2002 XV93	2002	1990	12	5.42
174567	Varda	2003	1980	23	3.1
84922	2003 VS_{2}	2003	1991	12	4.1
208996	Achlys	2003	1996	7	3.54
455502	2003 UZ_{413}	2003	1954	49	4.38
90377	Sedna	2003	1990	13	1.83
444030	2004 NT_{33}	2004	1982	22	4.4
230965	2004 XA_{192}	2004	1989	15	4.1
90568	Goibniu	2004	1954	50	4.25
90482	Orcus	2004	1951	53	2.2
175113	2004 PF_{115}	2004	1992	12	4.54
120347	Salacia	2004	1982	22	4.36
120348	2004 TY_{364}	2004	1983	21	4.52
136108	Haumea	2004	1955	49	0.2
145451	Rumina	2005	1976	29	4.4
145452	Ritona	2005	1954	51	3.89
202421	2005 UQ_{513}	2005	1990	15	3.4
136199	Eris	2005	1954	51	-1.17
136472	Makemake	2005	1955	50	-0.3
470308	2007 JH_{43}	2007	1984	23	4.49
229762	Gǃkúnǁʼhòmdímà	2007	1982	25	3.69
225088	Gonggong	2007	1985	22	1.8
523671	2013 FZ_{27}	2013	2001	12	4.1
472271	2014 UM_{33}	2014	2003	11	5.2
523794	2015 RR_{245}	2015	2004	11	3.6
	2018 VG18	2018	2003	15	3.5
	2026 ED138	2026	1937	89	3.11

=== Oort cloud comets ===
Oort cloud comets can take 10+ years going from Neptune's orbit at 30.1 AU (4.50 billion km) to perihelion (closest approach to the Sun). As modern survey archives reach fainter magnitudes and are more comprehensive, significant precovery images have become easier to locate.

Oort Cloud Comets
Comet	Discovery date	Precovery date	Discovery distance from Sun (AU)	Precovery distance from Sun (AU)	Ref
C/2010 U3 (Boattini)	2010-10-31	2005-11-05	18.4	25.8	JPL
C/2012 S1 (ISON)	2012-09-21	2011-09-30	6.3	9.4	JPL
C/2013 A1 (Siding Spring)	2013-01-03	2012-10-04	7.2	7.9	JPL
C/2017 K2 (PANSTARRS)	2017-05-21	2013-05-12	16.1	23.7	JPL

== See also ==
- Discovery image
- DANEOPS
