= (15807) 1994 GV9 =

Trans-Neptunian object

(15807) 1994 GV_{9}
- 1994 GV_{9}'s orbit around the Sun.

Discovery
- Discovered by: D. C. Jewitt; J. Chen
- Discovery site: Mauna Kea Obs.
- Discovery date: 15 April 1994

Designations
- Minor planet category: TNO · cubewano cold

Orbital characteristics
- Epoch 27 April 2019 (JD 2458600.5)
- Uncertainty parameter 4 excite_mean = 0.077
- Observation arc: 20.88 yr (7,627 d)
- Aphelion: 46.540 AU
- Perihelion: 41.328 AU
- Semi-major axis: 43.934 AU
- Eccentricity: 0.0593
- Orbital period (sidereal): 291.21 yr (106,365 d)
- Mean anomaly: 73.373°
- Mean motion: 0° 0^{m} 12.24^{s} / day
- Inclination: 0.5594°
- Longitude of ascending node: 176.57°
- Argument of perihelion: 309.63°

Physical characteristics
- Mean diameter: 101 km 147 km
- Geometric albedo: 0.09–0.2 (assumed)
- Absolute magnitude (H): 7.4

(15807) 1994 GV_{9} is a trans-Neptunian object from the classical Kuiper belt located in the outermost region of the Solar System. The cubewano belongs to the orbitally unexcited cold population. It was discovered on 15 April 1994, by astronomers David Jewitt and Jun Chen at the Mauna Kea Observatories, near Hilo, Hawaii.

== Description ==
As of 2018, it is 43.3 AU from the Sun. Currently, the closest approach possible to Neptune (MOID) is 11.2 AU (1.68 billion km). Very little is known about the object. Based on the brightness and distance, it is estimated to be between 100 and 150 km in diameter depending on the albedo.

1994 GV_{9} is the second cubewano to be given an official Minor Planet Center catalog number. The first cubewano is 15760 Albion.
