= Classical Kuiper belt object =

Kuiper belt object, not controlled by an orbital resonance with Neptune

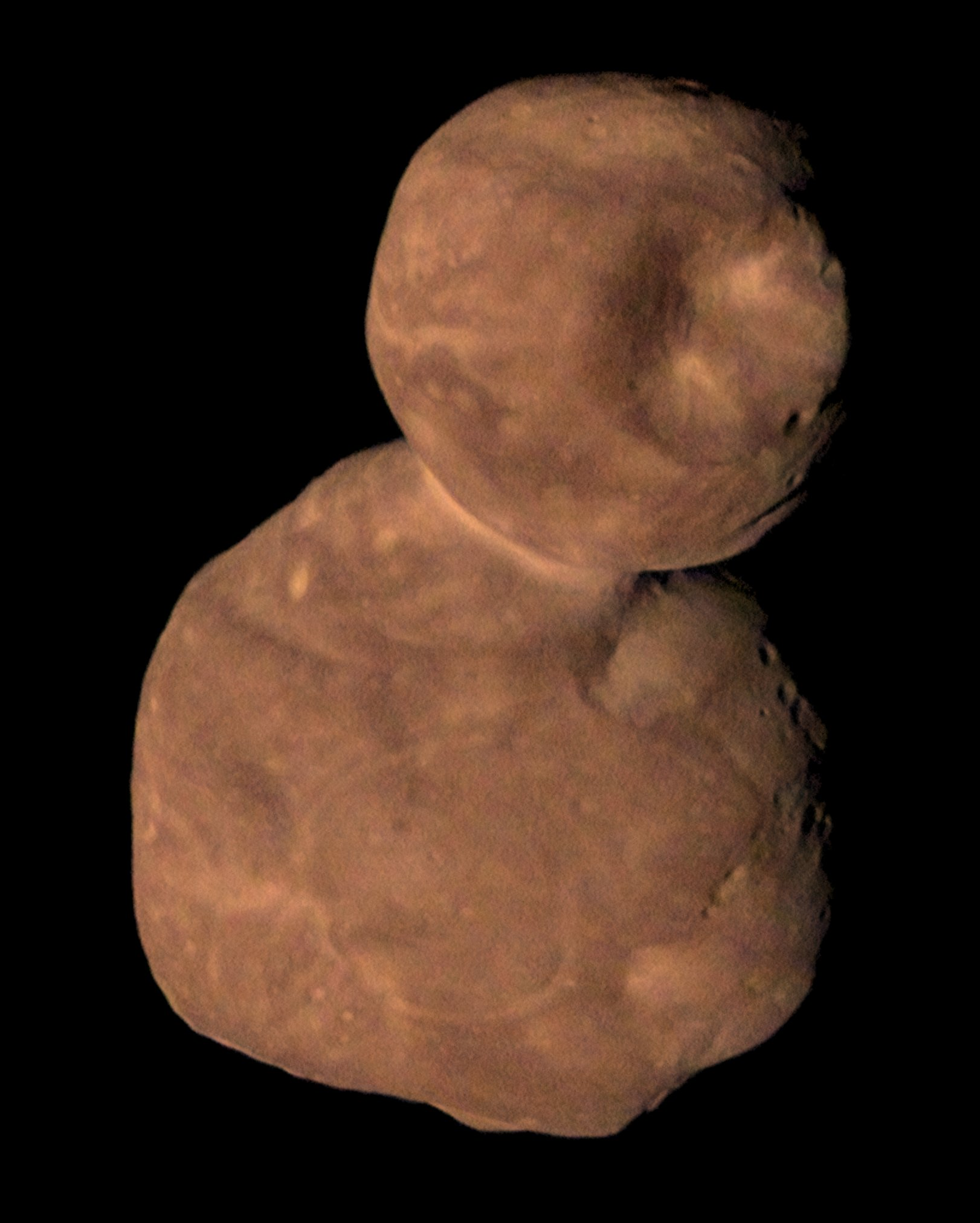
486958 Arrokoth, the first classical Kuiper belt object visited by a spacecraft.

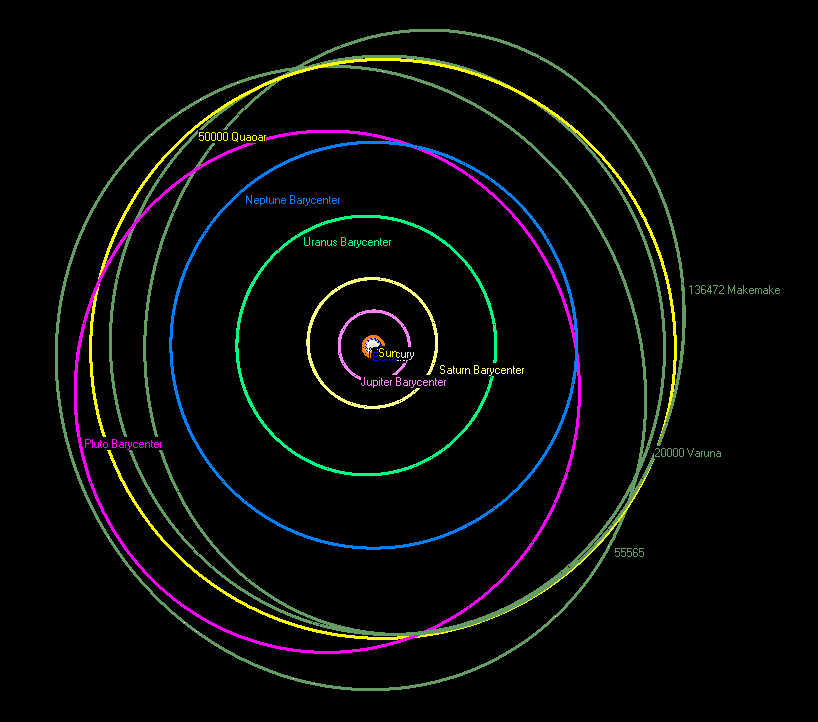
The orbits of various cubewanos compared to the orbit of Neptune (blue) and Pluto (magenta)

A classical Kuiper belt object, also called a cubewano (/ˌkjuːbiːˈwʌnoʊ/ "QB1-o"), (Note: Somewhat old-fashioned, but "cubewano" is still used by the Minor Planet Center for their list of Distant Minor Planets.) is a low-eccentricity Kuiper belt object (KBO) that orbits beyond Neptune and is not controlled by an orbital resonance with Neptune. Cubewanos have orbits with semi-major axes in the 40–50 AU range and, unlike Pluto, do not cross Neptune's orbit. That is, they have low-eccentricity and sometimes low-inclination orbits like the classical planets.

The name "cubewano" derives from the first trans-Neptunian object (TNO) found after Pluto and Charon: 15760 Albion, which until January 2018 had only the provisional designation (15760) 1992 QB_{1}. Similar objects found later were often called "QB1-os", or "cubewanos", after this object, though the term "classical" is much more frequently used in the scientific literature.

Objects identified as cubewanos include:

- 15760 Albion (aka 1992 QB_{1} and gave rise to the term "Cubewano")
- Makemake, a dwarf planet
- Quaoar and 20000 Varuna, each considered the largest TNO at the time of discovery
- 19521 Chaos, 58534 Logos, 53311 Deucalion, 66652 Borasisi, 88611 Teharonhiawako
- (33001) 1997 CU29, (55636) 2002 TX300, 55565 Aya, 55637 Uni
- 486958 Arrokoth

Haumea was provisionally listed as a cubewano by the Minor Planet Center in 2006, but was later found to be in a resonant orbit.

== Orbits: 'hot' and 'cold' populations ==
There are two basic dynamical classes of classical Kuiper-belt bodies: those with relatively unperturbed ('cold') orbits, and those with markedly perturbed ('hot') orbits.

Most cubewanos are found between the 2:3 orbital resonance with Neptune (populated by plutinos) and the 1:2 resonance. 50000 Quaoar, for example, has a near-circular orbit close to the ecliptic. Plutinos, on the other hand, have more eccentric orbits bringing some of them closer to the Sun than Neptune.

The majority of classical objects, the so-called cold population, have low inclinations (< 5°) and near-circular orbits, lying between 42 and 47 AU. A smaller population (the hot population) is characterised by highly inclined, more eccentric orbits. The terms 'hot' and 'cold' has nothing to do with surface or internal temperatures, but rather refer to the orbits of the objects, by analogy to molecules in a gas, which increase their relative velocity as they heat up.

The Deep Ecliptic Survey reports the distributions of the two populations; one with the inclination centered at 4.6° (named Core) and another with inclinations extending beyond 30° (Halo).

Semi-major axis and inclination of Kuiper belt objects, with cold classical KBOs (blue), hot classical KBOs (light blue), plutinos (orange), and resonant KBOs (red). The Haumea family is additionally highlighted in slate blue.

=== Distribution ===
The vast majority of KBOs (more than two-thirds) have inclinations of less than 5° and eccentricities of less than 0.1. Their semi-major axes show a preference for the middle of the main belt; arguably, smaller objects close to the limiting resonances have been either captured into resonance or have their orbits modified by Neptune.

The 'hot' and 'cold' populations are strikingly different: more than 30% of all cubewanos are in low inclination, near-circular orbits. The parameters of the plutinos' orbits are more evenly distributed, with a local maximum in moderate eccentricities in 0.15–0.2 range, and low inclinations 5–10°. See also the comparison with scattered disk objects.

Cubewanos form a clear 'belt' outside Neptune's orbit, whereas the plutinos approach, or even cross Neptune's orbit. When orbital inclinations are compared, 'hot' cubewanos can be easily distinguished by their higher inclinations, as the plutinos typically keep orbits <20°. The high inclination of 'hot' cubewanos has not been explained.

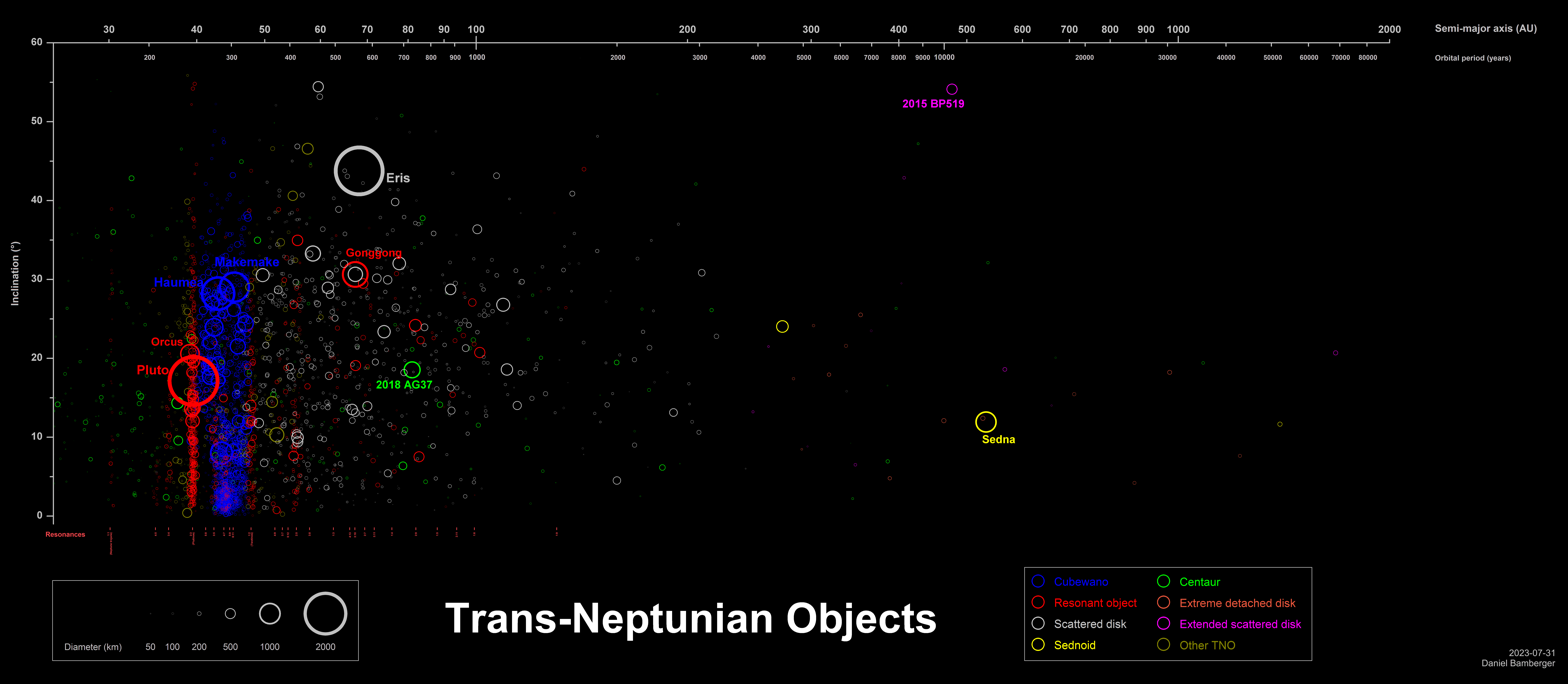
Left: TNO distribution of cubewanos (blue), resonant TNOs (red), SDOs (grey) and sednoids (yellow). Right: Comparison of the aligned orbits (polar and ecliptic view) of cubewanos, plutinos, and Neptune (yellow).

== Cold and hot populations: physical characteristics ==
In addition to the distinct orbital characteristics, the two populations display different physical characteristics.

The difference in colour between the red cold population, such as 486958 Arrokoth, and more heterogeneous hot population was observed as early as in 2002. Recent studies, based on a larger data set, indicate the cut-off inclination of 12° (instead of 5°) between the cold and hot populations and confirm the distinction between the homogenous red cold population and the bluish hot population.

Another difference between the low-inclination (cold) and high-inclination (hot) classical objects is the observed number of binary objects. Binaries are quite common on low-inclination orbits and are typically similar-brightness systems. Binaries are less common on high-inclination orbits and their components typically differ in brightness. This correlation, together with the differences in colour, support further the suggestion that the currently observed classical objects belong to at least two different overlapping populations, with different physical properties and orbital history.

== Toward a formal definition ==
There is no official definition of 'cubewano' or 'classical KBO'. However, the terms are normally used to refer to objects free from significant perturbation from Neptune, thereby excluding KBOs in orbital resonance with Neptune (resonant trans-Neptunian objects). The Minor Planet Center (MPC) and the Deep Ecliptic Survey (DES) do not list cubewanos (classical objects) using the same criteria. Many TNOs classified as cubewanos by the MPC, such as dwarf planet Makemake, are classified as ScatNear (possibly scattered by Neptune) by the DES. (119951) 2002 KX14 may be an inner cubewano near the plutinos. Furthermore, there is evidence that the Kuiper belt has an 'edge', in that an apparent lack of low-inclination objects beyond 47–49 AU was suspected as early as 1998 and shown with more data in 2001. Consequently, the traditional usage of the terms is based on the orbit's semi-major axis, and includes objects situated between the 2:3 and 1:2 resonances, that is between 39.4 and 47.8 AU (with exclusion of these resonances and the minor ones in-between).

These definitions lack precision: in particular the boundary between the classical objects and the scattered disk remains blurred. As of 2023, there are 870 objects with perihelion (q) > 40 AU and aphelion (Q) < 48 AU.

=== DES classification ===
Introduced by the report from the Deep Ecliptic Survey by J. L. Elliott et al. in 2005 uses formal criteria based on the mean orbital parameters. Put informally, the definition includes the objects that have never crossed the orbit of Neptune. According to this definition, an object qualifies as a classical KBO if:

- it is not resonant
- its average Tisserand's parameter with respect to Neptune exceeds 3
- its average eccentricity is less than 0.2.

=== SSBN07 classification ===
An alternative classification, introduced by B. Gladman, B. Marsden and C. van Laerhoven in 2007, uses a 10-million-year orbit integration instead of the Tisserand's parameter. Classical objects are defined as not resonant and not being currently scattered by Neptune.

Formally, this definition includes as classical all objects with their current orbits that

- are non-resonant (see the definition of the method)
- have a semi-major axis greater than that of Neptune (30.1 AU; i.e. excluding centaurs) but less than 2000 AU (to exclude inner-Oort-cloud objects)
- are not being scattered by Neptune
- have their eccentricity $e < 0.240$ (to exclude detached objects)

Unlike other schemes, this definition includes the objects with major semi-axis less than 39.4 AU (2:3 resonance)—termed inner classical belt, or more than 48.7 (1:2 resonance) – termed outer classical belt, and reserves the term main classical belt for the orbits between these two resonances.

== Families ==
The first known collisional family in the classical Kuiper belt—a group of objects thought to be remnants from the breakup of a single body—is the Haumea family. It includes Haumea, its moons, 2002 TX300 and seven smaller bodies. (Note: As of 2008. The four brightest objects of the family are situated on the graphs inside the circle representing Haumea.) The objects not only follow similar orbits but also share similar physical characteristics. Unlike many other KBO their surface contains large amounts of water ice (H_{2}O) and no or very little tholins. The surface composition is inferred from their neutral (as opposed to red) colour and deep absorption at 1.5 and 2. μm in infrared spectrum. Several other collisional families might reside in the classical Kuiper belt.

== Exploration ==
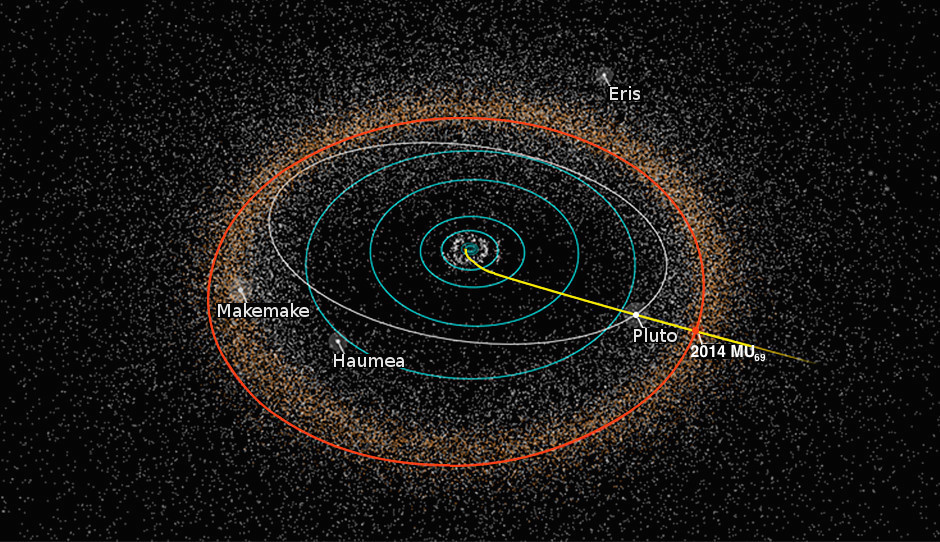
New Horizons trajectory and the orbits of Pluto and 486958 Arrokoth

As of January 2019, only one classical Kuiper belt object has been observed up close by spacecraft. Both Voyager spacecraft have passed through the region before the discovery of the Kuiper belt. New Horizons was the first mission to visit a classical KBO. After its successful exploration of the Pluto system in 2015, the NASA spacecraft has visited the small KBO 486958 Arrokoth at a distance of 3,500 kilometres (2,200 mi) on 1 January 2019.

== List ==
Here is a very generic list of classical Kuiper belt objects. As of July 2023, there are about 870 objects with q > 40 AU and Q < 48 AU.

- 15760 Albion
- (181708) 1993 FW
- (15807) 1994 GV9
- (16684) 1994 JQ1
- (19255) 1994 VK8
- (24835) 1995 SM55
- (15883) 1997 CR29
- 58534 Logos
- (33001) 1997 CU29
- 79360 Sila–Nunam
- (85627) 1998 HP151
- (85633) 1998 KR65
- (24978) 1998 HJ151
- (52747) 1998 HM151
- (69987) 1998 WA25
- 19521 Chaos
- 1998 WW31
- (59358) 1999 CL158
- (79983) 1999 DF9
- 53311 Deucalion
- (66452) 1999 OF4
- (612095) 1999 OJ4
- (86047) 1999 OY3
- (49673) 1999 RA215
- 66652 Borasisi
- (60454) 2000 CH105
- (80806) 2000 CM105
- (45802) 2000 PV29
- 20000 Varuna
- (88267) 2001 KE76
- 2001 QW322
- (524366) 2001 XR254
- 148780 Altjira
- 88611 Teharonhiawako
- (275809) 2001 QY297
- 55565 Aya
- (119951) 2002 KX14
- 50000 Quaoar
- 307261 Máni
- (55636) 2002 TX300
- 55637 Uni
- (508869) 2002 VT130
- (120178) 2003 OP32
- (307616) 2003 QW90
- (416400) 2003 UZ117
- 90568 Goibniu
- (444030) 2004 NT33
- 120347 Salacia
- (120348) 2004 TY364
- (144897) 2004 UX10
- 145452 Ritona
- (308193) 2005 CB79
- 469705 ǂKá̦gára
- 184314 Mbabamwanawaresa
- (525462) 2005 EO304
- 136472 Makemake
- (145453) 2005 RR43
- (202421) 2005 UQ513
- (278361) 2007 JJ43
- (547893) 2010 WN75
- 2011 JY31
- 2011 KW48
- 420356 Praamžius
- (516977) 2012 HZ84
- 2014 MT69
- 486958 Arrokoth
- (556416) 2014 OE394
- 2014 OS393
- 2015 VW168

== See also ==
- Lists of astronomical objects
