= Uncertainty parameter =

Parameter introduced by the Minor Planet Center

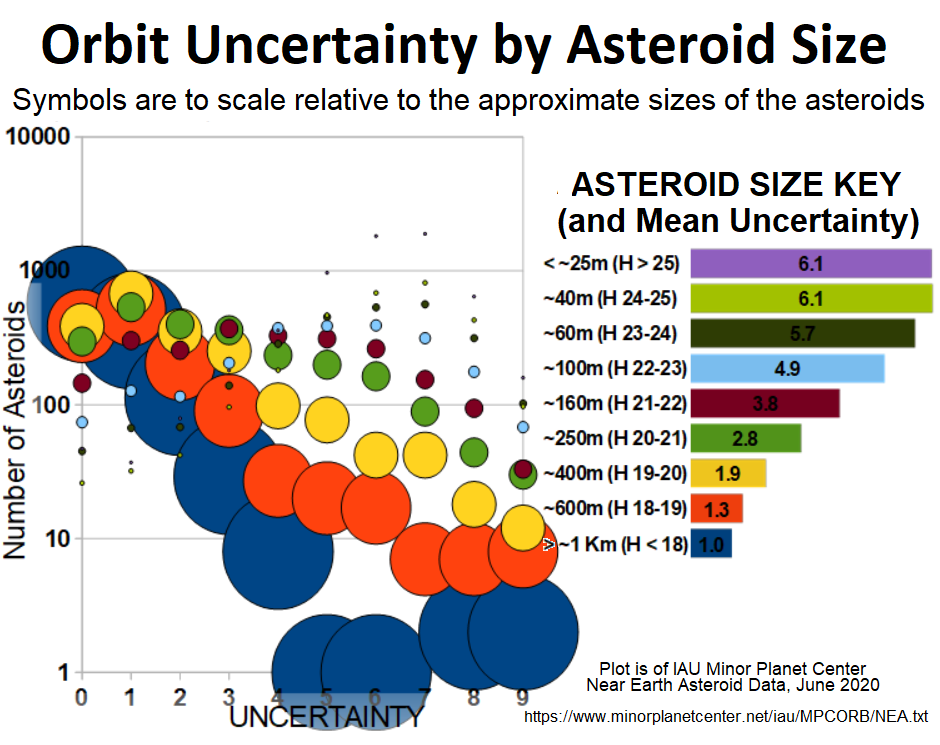
The orbits of kilometre class NEAs are generally well known, though a few have been lost. However, large numbers of smaller NEAs have highly uncertain orbits.

The uncertainty parameter U is introduced by the Minor Planet Center (MPC) to quantify the uncertainty of a perturbed orbital solution for a minor planet. The parameter is a logarithmic scale from 0 to 9 that measures the anticipated longitudinal uncertainty in the minor planet's mean anomaly after 10 years. The larger the number, the larger the uncertainty. The uncertainty parameter is also known as condition code in JPL's Small-Body Database Browser. The U value should not be used as a predictor for the uncertainty in the future motion of near-Earth objects.

== Orbital uncertainty ==
Classical Kuiper belt objects 40–50 AU from the Sun
JPL SBDB; Uncertainty parameter	Horizons; January 2018; Uncertainty in distance from the Sun (millions of kilometers)	Object	Reference; Ephemeris; Location: @sun Table setting: 39
0	0.00	(134340) Pluto	E2022-J69
1	±0.005	38628 Huya	JPL
2	±0.03	19521 Chaos	JPL
3	±0.10	15760 Albion	JPL
4	±1.4	(15807) 1994 GV9	JPL
5	±8.2	(160256) 2002 PD_{149}	JPL
6	±70	1999 DH_{8}	JPL
7	±190	1999 CQ_{153}	JPL
8	±590	1995 KJ_{1}	JPL
9	±1,600	1995 GJ	JPL
'D'	Data insufficient for orbit determination.		
'E'	Eccentricity was guessed instead of determined.		
'F'	Both 'D' and 'E' apply.		

Orbital uncertainty is related to several parameters used in the orbit determination process including the number of observations (measurements), the time spanned by those observations (observation arc), the quality of the observations (e.g. radar vs. optical), and the geometry of the observations. Of these parameters, the time spanned by the observations generally has the greatest effect on the orbital uncertainty.

Occasionally, the Minor Planet Center substitutes a letter-code ('D', 'E', 'F') for the uncertainty parameter.

D	Objects with a 'D' have only been observed for a single opposition, and have been assigned two (or more) different designations ("double").
E	Objects such as 2003 UU_{291} with a condition code 'E' in the place of a numeric uncertainty parameter denotes orbits for which the listed eccentricity was assumed, rather than determined. Objects with assumed eccentricities are generally considered lost if they have not recently been observed because their orbits are not well constrained.
F	Objects with an 'F' fall in both categories 'D' and 'E'.

== Calculation ==
The U parameter is calculated in two steps. First the in-orbit longitude runoff $r$ in seconds of arc per decade is calculated, (i.e. the discrepancy between the observed and calculated position extrapolated over ten years):

$$r=\left(\Delta\tau\cdot e + 10\cdot\frac{\;\Delta P\;}{P}\right) \cdot 3600 \cdot 3 \cdot \frac{\;k_\text{o}\;}{P}$$

with

$\Delta\tau$	uncertainty in the perihelion time in days
$e$	eccentricity of the determined orbit
$P$	orbital period in years
$\Delta P$	uncertainty in the orbital period in days
$k_\text{o}$	$0.01720209895\cdot\frac{180^\circ}{\pi}$, Gaussian gravitational constant, converted to degrees

Then, the obtained in-orbit longitude runoff is converted to the "uncertainty parameter" U, which is an integer between 0 and 9. The calculated number can be less than 0 or more than 9, but in those cases either 0 or 9 is used instead. The formula for cutting off the calculated value of U is

$$U=\min \left\{ ~9, ~ \max \Bigl\{ \; 0, \; \left\lfloor 9\cdot\frac{\log r}{\;\log 648{,}000\;} \right\rfloor + 1 \; \Bigr\} ~ \right\}$$

For instance: As of 10 September 2016, Ceres technically has an uncertainty of around −2.6, but is instead displayed as the minimal 0.

The result is the same regardless of the choice of base for the logarithm, so long as the same logarithm is used throughout the formula; e.g. for "log" = log_{10}, log_{e}, ln, or log_{2} the calculated value of U remains the same if the logarithm is the same in both places in the formula.

Function graph U(r)

U	Runoff Longitude runoff per decade
0	< 1.0 arc second
1	1.0–4.4 arc seconds
2	4.4–19.6 arc seconds
3	19.6 arc seconds – 1.4 arc minutes
4	1.4–6.4 arc minutes
5	6.4–28 arc minutes
6	28 arc minutes – 2.1°
7	2.1°–9.2°
8	9.2°–41°
9	> 41°

648 000 is the number of arc seconds in a half circle, so a value greater than 9 would be meaningless as we would have no idea where the object will be in 10 years within the orbit.
