= List of minor planets: 556001–557000 =

The following is a partial list of minor planets, running from minor-planet number 556001 through 557000, inclusive. The primary data for this and other partial lists is based on JPL's "Small-Body Orbital Elements" and data available from the Minor Planet Center. Critical list information is also provided by the MPC, unless otherwise specified from Lowell Observatory. A detailed description of the table's columns and additional sources are given on the main page including a complete list of every page in this series, and a statistical break-up on the dynamical classification of minor planets.

Also see the summary list of all named bodies in numerical and alphabetical order, and the corresponding naming citations for the number range of this particular list. New namings may only be added to this list after official publication, as the preannouncement of names is condemned by the Working Group for Small Bodies Nomenclature of the International Astronomical Union.

Near-Earth obj.	MBA (inner)	MBA (outer)	Centaur
Mars-crosser	MBA (middle)	Jupiter trojan	Trans-Neptunian obj.
Unclassified

== 556001–556100 ==
Designation			Discovery			Properties		Ref
Permanent	Provisional	Named after	Date	Site	Discoverer(s)	Category	Diam.	Ref
556001	2014 HM_{191}	—	October 21, 2011	Mount Lemmon	Mount Lemmon Survey	·	2.5 km	MPC · JPL
556002	2014 HR_{191}	—	March 14, 2010	Mount Lemmon	Mount Lemmon Survey	V	540 m	MPC · JPL
556003	2014 HX_{194}	—	March 28, 2014	Haleakala	Pan-STARRS 1	·	1.2 km	MPC · JPL
556004	2014 HA_{200}	—	April 29, 2014	Haleakala	Pan-STARRS 1	res · 2:5	438 km	MPC · JPL
556005	2014 HN_{202}	—	March 12, 2010	Kitt Peak	Spacewatch	MAS	610 m	MPC · JPL
556006	2014 HS_{205}	—	April 28, 2003	Kitt Peak	Spacewatch	·	830 m	MPC · JPL
556007	2014 HB_{208}	—	August 23, 2004	Kitt Peak	Spacewatch	·	700 m	MPC · JPL
556008	2014 HS_{211}	—	April 29, 2014	Haleakala	Pan-STARRS 1	·	880 m	MPC · JPL
556009	2014 HR_{224}	—	April 29, 2014	Haleakala	Pan-STARRS 1	·	1.7 km	MPC · JPL
556010	2014 JL	—	July 26, 2001	Palomar	NEAT	·	800 m	MPC · JPL
556011	2014 JB_{4}	—	September 25, 2012	Mount Lemmon	Mount Lemmon Survey	NYS	890 m	MPC · JPL
556012	2014 JP_{4}	—	August 27, 2011	Haleakala	Pan-STARRS 1	·	900 m	MPC · JPL
556013	2014 JS_{4}	—	May 2, 2014	Kitt Peak	Spacewatch	·	850 m	MPC · JPL
556014	2014 JY_{6}	—	April 29, 2014	ESA OGS	ESA OGS	·	1.1 km	MPC · JPL
556015	2014 JC_{7}	—	January 14, 2013	Mount Lemmon	Mount Lemmon Survey	PHO	770 m	MPC · JPL
556016	2014 JQ_{7}	—	February 9, 2010	Kitt Peak	Spacewatch	NYS	830 m	MPC · JPL
556017	2014 JN_{9}	—	September 5, 2007	Mount Lemmon	Mount Lemmon Survey	NYS	910 m	MPC · JPL
556018	2014 JV_{9}	—	March 23, 2003	Apache Point	SDSS Collaboration	·	1.0 km	MPC · JPL
556019	2014 JL_{10}	—	December 23, 2012	Haleakala	Pan-STARRS 1	·	1.1 km	MPC · JPL
556020	2014 JD_{14}	—	January 21, 2002	Kitt Peak	Spacewatch	·	1.6 km	MPC · JPL
556021	2014 JG_{14}	—	November 24, 2012	Kitt Peak	Spacewatch	·	670 m	MPC · JPL
556022	2014 JU_{14}	—	September 16, 2012	Mount Lemmon	Mount Lemmon Survey	·	1.0 km	MPC · JPL
556023	2014 JY_{18}	—	July 28, 2011	Siding Spring	SSS	·	630 m	MPC · JPL
556024	2014 JE_{19}	—	May 13, 2007	Kitt Peak	Spacewatch	·	840 m	MPC · JPL
556025	2014 JB_{20}	—	March 25, 2014	Kitt Peak	Spacewatch	·	600 m	MPC · JPL
556026	2014 JW_{21}	—	December 28, 2005	Kitt Peak	Spacewatch	NYS	1.4 km	MPC · JPL
556027	2014 JX_{21}	—	July 29, 2000	Cerro Tololo	Deep Ecliptic Survey	MAS	880 m	MPC · JPL
556028	2014 JR_{23}	—	December 5, 2005	Mount Lemmon	Mount Lemmon Survey	·	1.1 km	MPC · JPL
556029	2014 JS_{28}	—	December 5, 2007	Mount Lemmon	Mount Lemmon Survey	·	1.6 km	MPC · JPL
556030	2014 JC_{29}	—	May 5, 2014	Mount Lemmon	Mount Lemmon Survey	·	1.2 km	MPC · JPL
556031	2014 JW_{31}	—	April 29, 2014	Haleakala	Pan-STARRS 1	·	1.0 km	MPC · JPL
556032	2014 JQ_{33}	—	January 31, 2006	Catalina	CSS	·	1.3 km	MPC · JPL
556033	2014 JX_{33}	—	November 30, 2005	Mount Lemmon	Mount Lemmon Survey	V	560 m	MPC · JPL
556034	2014 JC_{34}	—	April 10, 2000	Kitt Peak	M. W. Buie	·	890 m	MPC · JPL
556035	2014 JT_{35}	—	September 23, 2011	Haleakala	Pan-STARRS 1	NYS	1.0 km	MPC · JPL
556036	2014 JZ_{36}	—	April 24, 2003	Kitt Peak	Spacewatch	·	910 m	MPC · JPL
556037	2014 JM_{37}	—	May 4, 2014	Haleakala	Pan-STARRS 1	V	540 m	MPC · JPL
556038	2014 JZ_{37}	—	June 12, 2007	Kitt Peak	Spacewatch	(2076)	610 m	MPC · JPL
556039	2014 JA_{39}	—	November 7, 2005	Mauna Kea	A. Boattini	·	960 m	MPC · JPL
556040	2014 JT_{44}	—	June 11, 2004	Kitt Peak	Spacewatch	·	430 m	MPC · JPL
556041	2014 JD_{46}	—	April 5, 2014	Haleakala	Pan-STARRS 1	NYS	790 m	MPC · JPL
556042	2014 JZ_{46}	—	September 19, 2011	Haleakala	Pan-STARRS 1	·	910 m	MPC · JPL
556043	2014 JO_{51}	—	May 3, 2014	Mount Lemmon	Mount Lemmon Survey	·	890 m	MPC · JPL
556044	2014 JT_{51}	—	March 4, 2006	Kitt Peak	Spacewatch	·	1.6 km	MPC · JPL
556045	2014 JF_{55}	—	May 5, 2003	Kitt Peak	Spacewatch	·	960 m	MPC · JPL
556046	2014 JT_{56}	—	April 8, 2014	Haleakala	Pan-STARRS 1	H	430 m	MPC · JPL
556047	2014 JV_{57}	—	May 12, 2007	Mount Lemmon	Mount Lemmon Survey	·	680 m	MPC · JPL
556048	2014 JD_{59}	—	May 4, 2014	Haleakala	Pan-STARRS 1	·	950 m	MPC · JPL
556049	2014 JK_{60}	—	January 24, 2006	Kitt Peak	Spacewatch	·	920 m	MPC · JPL
556050	2014 JG_{61}	—	September 17, 2003	Kitt Peak	Spacewatch	·	1.2 km	MPC · JPL
556051	2014 JQ_{62}	—	February 28, 2014	Haleakala	Pan-STARRS 1	·	940 m	MPC · JPL
556052	2014 JK_{63}	—	September 29, 2011	Mount Lemmon	Mount Lemmon Survey	PHO	680 m	MPC · JPL
556053	2014 JD_{64}	—	February 10, 2010	Kitt Peak	Spacewatch	NYS	760 m	MPC · JPL
556054	2014 JQ_{65}	—	December 3, 2008	Kitt Peak	Spacewatch	·	1.1 km	MPC · JPL
556055	2014 JS_{65}	—	September 24, 2011	Haleakala	Pan-STARRS 1	·	840 m	MPC · JPL
556056	2014 JU_{66}	—	September 4, 2004	Palomar	NEAT	·	920 m	MPC · JPL
556057	2014 JD_{67}	—	February 25, 2006	Kitt Peak	Spacewatch	·	1.0 km	MPC · JPL
556058	2014 JE_{68}	—	May 3, 2014	Mount Lemmon	Mount Lemmon Survey	·	1.2 km	MPC · JPL
556059	2014 JB_{69}	—	January 11, 2010	Kitt Peak	Spacewatch	·	740 m	MPC · JPL
556060	2014 JT_{70}	—	March 20, 2010	Catalina	CSS	·	1.0 km	MPC · JPL
556061	2014 JF_{71}	—	October 10, 2004	Kitt Peak	Spacewatch	·	670 m	MPC · JPL
556062	2014 JR_{71}	—	January 11, 2010	Mount Lemmon	Mount Lemmon Survey	·	620 m	MPC · JPL
556063	2014 JU_{73}	—	September 29, 2008	Mount Lemmon	Mount Lemmon Survey	·	1.1 km	MPC · JPL
556064	2014 JA_{78}	—	April 5, 2014	Haleakala	Pan-STARRS 1	PHO	790 m	MPC · JPL
556065	2014 JQ_{78}	—	April 29, 2003	Kitt Peak	Spacewatch	·	1.2 km	MPC · JPL
556066	2014 JR_{78}	—	April 11, 2003	Kitt Peak	Spacewatch	NYS	1.1 km	MPC · JPL
556067	2014 JK_{80}	—	May 4, 2014	Haleakala	Pan-STARRS 1	plutino · fast	265 km	MPC · JPL
556068	2014 JR_{80}	—	May 6, 2014	Haleakala	Pan-STARRS 1	plutino	505 km	MPC · JPL
556069	2014 JT_{88}	—	May 4, 2014	Haleakala	Pan-STARRS 1	·	770 m	MPC · JPL
556070	2014 JT_{89}	—	May 6, 2014	Haleakala	Pan-STARRS 1	PHO	690 m	MPC · JPL
556071	2014 JA_{95}	—	May 6, 2014	Haleakala	Pan-STARRS 1	·	710 m	MPC · JPL
556072	2014 JE_{100}	—	May 7, 2014	Haleakala	Pan-STARRS 1	·	2.7 km	MPC · JPL
556073	2014 JP_{100}	—	May 2, 2014	Mount Lemmon	Mount Lemmon Survey	·	1.3 km	MPC · JPL
556074	2014 JX_{108}	—	May 6, 2014	Haleakala	Pan-STARRS 1	·	2.4 km	MPC · JPL
556075	2014 JG_{109}	—	October 12, 2010	Mount Lemmon	Mount Lemmon Survey	·	2.0 km	MPC · JPL
556076	2014 JT_{113}	—	May 4, 2014	Haleakala	Pan-STARRS 1	·	650 m	MPC · JPL
556077	2014 JO_{114}	—	May 5, 2014	Mount Lemmon	Mount Lemmon Survey	NEM	1.9 km	MPC · JPL
556078	2014 JJ_{118}	—	February 15, 2013	Haleakala	Pan-STARRS 1	3:2	4.6 km	MPC · JPL
556079	2014 KN_{3}	—	August 23, 2004	Kitt Peak	Spacewatch	·	4.0 km	MPC · JPL
556080	2014 KN_{6}	—	September 26, 2000	Haleakala	NEAT	·	1.4 km	MPC · JPL
556081	2014 KW_{6}	—	September 23, 2008	Mount Lemmon	Mount Lemmon Survey	·	1.1 km	MPC · JPL
556082	2014 KY_{6}	—	November 19, 2008	Mount Lemmon	Mount Lemmon Survey	·	1.1 km	MPC · JPL
556083	2014 KQ_{13}	—	September 8, 2011	Kitt Peak	Spacewatch	MAS	580 m	MPC · JPL
556084	2014 KW_{13}	—	September 25, 2008	Kitt Peak	Spacewatch	·	760 m	MPC · JPL
556085	2014 KC_{16}	—	September 4, 2011	Haleakala	Pan-STARRS 1	V	520 m	MPC · JPL
556086	2014 KS_{17}	—	May 7, 2014	Haleakala	Pan-STARRS 1	ERI	1.1 km	MPC · JPL
556087	2014 KB_{18}	—	December 3, 2005	Mauna Kea	A. Boattini	·	1.3 km	MPC · JPL
556088	2014 KK_{18}	—	August 11, 2007	Anderson Mesa	LONEOS	·	980 m	MPC · JPL
556089	2014 KP_{18}	—	April 5, 2014	Haleakala	Pan-STARRS 1	·	950 m	MPC · JPL
556090	2014 KR_{19}	—	April 22, 2014	Kitt Peak	Spacewatch	·	700 m	MPC · JPL
556091	2014 KX_{24}	—	September 23, 2011	Kitt Peak	Spacewatch	·	820 m	MPC · JPL
556092	2014 KH_{29}	—	December 25, 2005	Kitt Peak	Spacewatch	·	760 m	MPC · JPL
556093	2014 KL_{29}	—	September 23, 2011	Haleakala	Pan-STARRS 1	NYS	800 m	MPC · JPL
556094	2014 KP_{29}	—	September 2, 2011	Haleakala	Pan-STARRS 1	·	980 m	MPC · JPL
556095	2014 KO_{31}	—	January 13, 2013	Mount Lemmon	Mount Lemmon Survey	·	1.1 km	MPC · JPL
556096	2014 KE_{32}	—	November 7, 2012	Haleakala	Pan-STARRS 1	·	930 m	MPC · JPL
556097	2014 KD_{33}	—	April 21, 2014	Kitt Peak	Spacewatch	·	920 m	MPC · JPL
556098	2014 KG_{33}	—	April 22, 2007	Mount Lemmon	Mount Lemmon Survey	·	640 m	MPC · JPL
556099	2014 KC_{37}	—	January 17, 2013	Mount Lemmon	Mount Lemmon Survey	·	3.0 km	MPC · JPL
556100	2014 KR_{37}	—	February 28, 2014	Haleakala	Pan-STARRS 1	·	1.2 km	MPC · JPL

== 556101–556200 ==
back to top

Designation			Discovery			Properties		Ref
Permanent	Provisional	Named after	Date	Site	Discoverer(s)	Category	Diam.	Ref
556101	2014 KT_{40}	—	February 20, 2014	Haleakala	Pan-STARRS 1	·	670 m	MPC · JPL
556102	2014 KX_{40}	—	April 21, 2014	Kitt Peak	Spacewatch	·	870 m	MPC · JPL
556103	2014 KY_{42}	—	September 23, 2011	Kitt Peak	Spacewatch	PHO	790 m	MPC · JPL
556104	2014 KQ_{45}	—	May 9, 2014	Kitt Peak	Spacewatch	H	350 m	MPC · JPL
556105	2014 KV_{46}	—	April 5, 2014	Haleakala	Pan-STARRS 1	·	600 m	MPC · JPL
556106	2014 KX_{46}	—	April 19, 2007	Kitt Peak	Spacewatch	·	530 m	MPC · JPL
556107	2014 KB_{47}	—	February 18, 2010	Kitt Peak	Spacewatch	NYS	1.1 km	MPC · JPL
556108	2014 KX_{54}	—	September 4, 2011	Haleakala	Pan-STARRS 1	V	420 m	MPC · JPL
556109	2014 KZ_{60}	—	May 24, 2014	Haleakala	Pan-STARRS 1	PHO	780 m	MPC · JPL
556110	2014 KX_{62}	—	March 14, 2010	Mount Lemmon	Mount Lemmon Survey	NYS	970 m	MPC · JPL
556111	2014 KP_{63}	—	May 18, 2014	Mount Lemmon	Mount Lemmon Survey	·	1.1 km	MPC · JPL
556112	2014 KZ_{70}	—	February 16, 2010	Kitt Peak	Spacewatch	·	680 m	MPC · JPL
556113	2014 KG_{74}	—	September 23, 2011	Kitt Peak	Spacewatch	·	1.2 km	MPC · JPL
556114	2014 KL_{74}	—	September 2, 2011	Haleakala	Pan-STARRS 1	·	780 m	MPC · JPL
556115	2014 KC_{75}	—	September 2, 2011	Haleakala	Pan-STARRS 1	·	870 m	MPC · JPL
556116	2014 KS_{78}	—	September 12, 2007	Catalina	CSS	·	1.2 km	MPC · JPL
556117	2014 KY_{78}	—	September 29, 2011	Mount Lemmon	Mount Lemmon Survey	·	640 m	MPC · JPL
556118	2014 KM_{81}	—	November 9, 2008	Mount Lemmon	Mount Lemmon Survey	·	690 m	MPC · JPL
556119	2014 KR_{81}	—	May 20, 2014	Haleakala	Pan-STARRS 1	·	800 m	MPC · JPL
556120	2014 KL_{83}	—	October 1, 2008	Kitt Peak	Spacewatch	·	830 m	MPC · JPL
556121	2014 KU_{84}	—	November 20, 2003	Apache Point	SDSS Collaboration	·	1.3 km	MPC · JPL
556122	2014 KT_{89}	—	May 28, 2014	Haleakala	Pan-STARRS 1	·	2.7 km	MPC · JPL
556123	2014 KJ_{93}	—	July 21, 2007	Lulin	LUSS	·	1.6 km	MPC · JPL
556124	2014 KD_{94}	—	December 30, 2005	Flagstaff	Wasserman, L. H.	·	970 m	MPC · JPL
556125	2014 KE_{95}	—	November 30, 2008	Kitt Peak	Spacewatch	·	1.6 km	MPC · JPL
556126	2014 KC_{96}	—	May 7, 2014	Haleakala	Pan-STARRS 1	·	1.2 km	MPC · JPL
556127	2014 KP_{98}	—	July 23, 2003	Palomar	NEAT	·	1.5 km	MPC · JPL
556128	2014 KY_{99}	—	March 29, 2014	Haleakala	Pan-STARRS 1	·	700 m	MPC · JPL
556129	2014 KZ_{100}	—	July 20, 2003	Palomar	NEAT	H	580 m	MPC · JPL
556130	2014 KV_{101}	—	May 21, 2014	Haleakala	Pan-STARRS 1	plutino	166 km	MPC · JPL
556131	2014 KQ_{106}	—	December 29, 2005	Kitt Peak	Spacewatch	·	850 m	MPC · JPL
556132	2014 KR_{106}	—	January 14, 2002	Kitt Peak	Spacewatch	·	1.2 km	MPC · JPL
556133	2014 KZ_{106}	—	May 20, 2014	Haleakala	Pan-STARRS 1	·	910 m	MPC · JPL
556134	2014 KG_{107}	—	March 15, 2010	Kitt Peak	Spacewatch	·	1.1 km	MPC · JPL
556135	2014 KN_{107}	—	May 21, 2014	Haleakala	Pan-STARRS 1	·	900 m	MPC · JPL
556136	2014 KV_{112}	—	May 21, 2014	Haleakala	Pan-STARRS 1	·	1.2 km	MPC · JPL
556137	2014 KN_{117}	—	May 20, 2014	Haleakala	Pan-STARRS 1	·	870 m	MPC · JPL
556138	2014 KO_{124}	—	May 20, 2014	Haleakala	Pan-STARRS 1	·	750 m	MPC · JPL
556139	2014 LE	—	March 17, 2009	Kitt Peak	Spacewatch	·	420 m	MPC · JPL
556140	2014 LU	—	May 4, 2014	Mount Lemmon	Mount Lemmon Survey	V	660 m	MPC · JPL
556141	2014 LX	—	November 19, 2006	Kitt Peak	Spacewatch	EOS	1.3 km	MPC · JPL
556142	2014 LY_{1}	—	June 21, 2007	Kitt Peak	Spacewatch	NYS	700 m	MPC · JPL
556143	2014 LR_{2}	—	June 2, 2014	Mount Lemmon	Mount Lemmon Survey	·	970 m	MPC · JPL
556144	2014 LE_{3}	—	January 16, 2009	Mount Lemmon	Mount Lemmon Survey	·	1.1 km	MPC · JPL
556145	2014 LC_{4}	—	May 10, 2014	Haleakala	Pan-STARRS 1	·	700 m	MPC · JPL
556146	2014 LZ_{5}	—	January 2, 2006	Mount Lemmon	Mount Lemmon Survey	·	890 m	MPC · JPL
556147	2014 LC_{6}	—	September 26, 2011	Mount Lemmon	Mount Lemmon Survey	·	1.1 km	MPC · JPL
556148	2014 LM_{7}	—	August 24, 2011	Haleakala	Pan-STARRS 1	·	1.2 km	MPC · JPL
556149	2014 LZ_{9}	—	July 23, 2001	Palomar	NEAT	BAR	1.2 km	MPC · JPL
556150	2014 LS_{11}	—	June 21, 2007	Mount Lemmon	Mount Lemmon Survey	·	870 m	MPC · JPL
556151	2014 LG_{12}	—	May 25, 2014	Haleakala	Pan-STARRS 1	·	1.5 km	MPC · JPL
556152	2014 LR_{13}	—	October 22, 2011	Mount Lemmon	Mount Lemmon Survey	NYS	940 m	MPC · JPL
556153	2014 LG_{16}	—	June 3, 2014	Haleakala	Pan-STARRS 1	·	2.0 km	MPC · JPL
556154	2014 LL_{22}	—	May 28, 2014	Mount Lemmon	Mount Lemmon Survey	PHO	670 m	MPC · JPL
556155	2014 LS_{22}	—	September 20, 2011	Kitt Peak	Spacewatch	MAS	670 m	MPC · JPL
556156	2014 LA_{24}	—	June 6, 2014	Haleakala	Pan-STARRS 1	·	1.1 km	MPC · JPL
556157	2014 LP_{24}	—	July 9, 2010	Siding Spring	SSS	·	1.7 km	MPC · JPL
556158	2014 LK_{25}	—	April 10, 2010	Mount Lemmon	Mount Lemmon Survey	CLA	1.3 km	MPC · JPL
556159	2014 LZ_{28}	—	March 26, 2003	Apache Point	SDSS	H	520 m	MPC · JPL
556160	2014 LN_{29}	—	October 31, 2006	Kitt Peak	Spacewatch	·	1.5 km	MPC · JPL
556161	2014 LW_{29}	—	September 9, 2010	La Sagra	OAM	·	1.2 km	MPC · JPL
556162	2014 LZ_{31}	—	June 4, 2014	Haleakala	Pan-STARRS 1	·	1.6 km	MPC · JPL
556163	2014 LH_{33}	—	June 2, 2014	Haleakala	Pan-STARRS 1	·	1.5 km	MPC · JPL
556164	2014 MK_{1}	—	May 6, 2014	Haleakala	Pan-STARRS 1	·	1.2 km	MPC · JPL
556165	2014 MW_{4}	—	November 4, 2012	Haleakala	Pan-STARRS 1	H	420 m	MPC · JPL
556166	2014 MC_{7}	—	May 6, 2014	Haleakala	Pan-STARRS 1	·	930 m	MPC · JPL
556167	2014 MU_{8}	—	July 8, 2002	Palomar	NEAT	PHO	1.1 km	MPC · JPL
556168	2014 MF_{16}	—	October 28, 2011	Mount Lemmon	Mount Lemmon Survey	·	810 m	MPC · JPL
556169	2014 MU_{16}	—	April 3, 2005	Palomar	NEAT	(5)	1.4 km	MPC · JPL
556170	2014 MC_{19}	—	May 7, 2010	Mount Lemmon	Mount Lemmon Survey	·	1.4 km	MPC · JPL
556171	2014 MB_{20}	—	March 25, 2006	Palomar	NEAT	·	1.3 km	MPC · JPL
556172	2014 MN_{21}	—	April 24, 2003	Kitt Peak	Spacewatch	V	510 m	MPC · JPL
556173	2014 MU_{21}	—	January 23, 2006	Kitt Peak	Spacewatch	MAS	670 m	MPC · JPL
556174	2014 MD_{23}	—	June 3, 2014	Haleakala	Pan-STARRS 1	V	560 m	MPC · JPL
556175	2014 MH_{23}	—	March 13, 2010	Mount Lemmon	Mount Lemmon Survey	MAS	590 m	MPC · JPL
556176	2014 MJ_{23}	—	May 8, 2014	Haleakala	Pan-STARRS 1	PHO	810 m	MPC · JPL
556177	2014 MK_{23}	—	June 18, 2014	Haleakala	Pan-STARRS 1	·	1.1 km	MPC · JPL
556178	2014 MB_{25}	—	July 21, 2002	Palomar	NEAT	EUN	1.5 km	MPC · JPL
556179	2014 MQ_{27}	—	August 15, 2004	Palomar	NEAT	·	970 m	MPC · JPL
556180	2014 ME_{28}	—	February 16, 2004	Kitt Peak	Spacewatch	MAR	1.4 km	MPC · JPL
556181	2014 MA_{30}	—	June 4, 2014	Haleakala	Pan-STARRS 1	·	890 m	MPC · JPL
556182	2014 MQ_{31}	—	June 2, 2014	Mount Lemmon	Mount Lemmon Survey	·	1.0 km	MPC · JPL
556183	2014 MU_{31}	—	June 1, 2006	Mount Lemmon	Mount Lemmon Survey	PHO	610 m	MPC · JPL
556184	2014 MT_{33}	—	January 17, 2013	Haleakala	Pan-STARRS 1	·	850 m	MPC · JPL
556185	2014 MW_{33}	—	February 3, 2013	Haleakala	Pan-STARRS 1	·	1.1 km	MPC · JPL
556186	2014 MQ_{35}	—	January 22, 2006	Mount Lemmon	Mount Lemmon Survey	·	940 m	MPC · JPL
556187	2014 MW_{35}	—	June 18, 2014	Haleakala	Pan-STARRS 1	·	2.0 km	MPC · JPL
556188	2014 MX_{35}	—	September 20, 2003	Palomar	NEAT	·	960 m	MPC · JPL
556189	2014 MQ_{37}	—	October 2, 2006	Mount Lemmon	Mount Lemmon Survey	·	1 km	MPC · JPL
556190	2014 MT_{40}	—	October 15, 2007	Kitt Peak	Spacewatch	·	990 m	MPC · JPL
556191	2014 MM_{41}	—	April 14, 2010	Mount Lemmon	Mount Lemmon Survey	·	1.2 km	MPC · JPL
556192	2014 MW_{41}	—	February 14, 2008	Catalina	CSS	·	3.6 km	MPC · JPL
556193	2014 MM_{42}	—	June 5, 2014	Haleakala	Pan-STARRS 1	V	510 m	MPC · JPL
556194	2014 ME_{44}	—	May 7, 2014	Haleakala	Pan-STARRS 1	·	1.0 km	MPC · JPL
556195	2014 MA_{49}	—	June 29, 2014	Mount Lemmon	Mount Lemmon Survey	·	2.3 km	MPC · JPL
556196	2014 MP_{49}	—	March 26, 2006	Mount Lemmon	Mount Lemmon Survey	NYS	1.1 km	MPC · JPL
556197	2014 MA_{51}	—	November 18, 2011	Kitt Peak	Spacewatch	·	1.2 km	MPC · JPL
556198	2014 MR_{51}	—	June 1, 2014	Haleakala	Pan-STARRS 1	H	350 m	MPC · JPL
556199	2014 MB_{52}	—	November 28, 2011	Mount Lemmon	Mount Lemmon Survey	MAR	1.1 km	MPC · JPL
556200	2014 MX_{52}	—	May 23, 2002	Palomar	NEAT	·	1.7 km	MPC · JPL

== 556201–556300 ==
back to top

Designation			Discovery			Properties		Ref
Permanent	Provisional	Named after	Date	Site	Discoverer(s)	Category	Diam.	Ref
556201	2014 MF_{53}	—	May 30, 2014	Mount Lemmon	Mount Lemmon Survey	·	1.2 km	MPC · JPL
556202	2014 MA_{57}	—	July 8, 2003	Palomar	NEAT	NYS	1.4 km	MPC · JPL
556203	2014 MT_{57}	—	June 27, 2014	Haleakala	Pan-STARRS 1	MAR	900 m	MPC · JPL
556204	2014 MC_{58}	—	November 11, 2006	Kitt Peak	Spacewatch	·	1.4 km	MPC · JPL
556205	2014 MN_{58}	—	January 19, 2013	Mount Lemmon	Mount Lemmon Survey	EUN	1.2 km	MPC · JPL
556206	2014 MM_{60}	—	December 31, 2012	Haleakala	Pan-STARRS 1	H	420 m	MPC · JPL
556207	2014 MA_{63}	—	September 21, 2003	Kitt Peak	Spacewatch	V	710 m	MPC · JPL
556208	2014 MQ_{63}	—	April 30, 2006	Kitt Peak	Spacewatch	NYS	840 m	MPC · JPL
556209	2014 MM_{64}	—	January 13, 2008	Kitt Peak	Spacewatch	MAR	1.2 km	MPC · JPL
556210	2014 ML_{65}	—	September 19, 2001	Kitt Peak	Spacewatch	·	1.9 km	MPC · JPL
556211	2014 MY_{71}	—	December 16, 2006	Mount Lemmon	Mount Lemmon Survey	·	1.6 km	MPC · JPL
556212	2014 MZ_{72}	—	January 16, 2009	Mount Lemmon	Mount Lemmon Survey	·	910 m	MPC · JPL
556213	2014 ML_{73}	—	June 20, 2014	Haleakala	Pan-STARRS 1	PHO	1.0 km	MPC · JPL
556214	2014 MZ_{74}	—	June 24, 2014	Haleakala	Pan-STARRS 1	·	1.1 km	MPC · JPL
556215	2014 MS_{75}	—	October 20, 2011	Mount Lemmon	Mount Lemmon Survey	·	940 m	MPC · JPL
556216	2014 MY_{75}	—	December 5, 2007	Kitt Peak	Spacewatch	·	930 m	MPC · JPL
556217	2014 MN_{76}	—	September 16, 2006	Catalina	CSS	·	1.4 km	MPC · JPL
556218	2014 MD_{78}	—	November 15, 2006	Kitt Peak	Spacewatch	ADE	1.5 km	MPC · JPL
556219	2014 MN_{78}	—	June 21, 2014	Haleakala	Pan-STARRS 1	NYS	1.1 km	MPC · JPL
556220	2014 MH_{79}	—	June 30, 2014	Haleakala	Pan-STARRS 1	·	910 m	MPC · JPL
556221	2014 MP_{79}	—	December 27, 2006	Mount Lemmon	Mount Lemmon Survey	LIX	3.5 km	MPC · JPL
556222	2014 MO_{80}	—	June 29, 2014	Haleakala	Pan-STARRS 1	EUN	810 m	MPC · JPL
556223	2014 MP_{92}	—	June 24, 2014	Haleakala	Pan-STARRS 1	·	2.1 km	MPC · JPL
556224	2014 MQ_{93}	—	June 24, 2014	Haleakala	Pan-STARRS 1	·	1.9 km	MPC · JPL
556225	2014 NF_{1}	—	November 26, 2011	Mount Lemmon	Mount Lemmon Survey	·	1.5 km	MPC · JPL
556226	2014 NB_{4}	—	December 27, 2011	Kitt Peak	Spacewatch	·	1.3 km	MPC · JPL
556227	2014 NV_{8}	—	May 17, 2010	Mount Lemmon	Mount Lemmon Survey	NYS	1 km	MPC · JPL
556228	2014 NP_{11}	—	September 14, 2007	Mount Lemmon	Mount Lemmon Survey	MAS	580 m	MPC · JPL
556229	2014 NW_{19}	—	July 2, 2014	Mount Lemmon	Mount Lemmon Survey	EUN	860 m	MPC · JPL
556230	2014 NP_{24}	—	September 15, 2004	Mauna Kea	Pittichová, J., Bedient, J.	·	3.2 km	MPC · JPL
556231	2014 NE_{26}	—	July 2, 2014	Haleakala	Pan-STARRS 1	·	990 m	MPC · JPL
556232	2014 NG_{30}	—	June 2, 2014	Haleakala	Pan-STARRS 1	·	810 m	MPC · JPL
556233	2014 NP_{31}	—	June 2, 2014	Haleakala	Pan-STARRS 1	PHO	720 m	MPC · JPL
556234	2014 NU_{32}	—	January 10, 2013	Haleakala	Pan-STARRS 1	·	920 m	MPC · JPL
556235	2014 NP_{35}	—	July 2, 2014	Haleakala	Pan-STARRS 1	EUN	1.0 km	MPC · JPL
556236	2014 NU_{36}	—	October 11, 2006	Palomar	NEAT	EUN	1.5 km	MPC · JPL
556237	2014 NK_{40}	—	September 17, 2006	Catalina	CSS	MAR	1.0 km	MPC · JPL
556238	2014 NH_{41}	—	July 3, 2014	Haleakala	Pan-STARRS 1	·	1.2 km	MPC · JPL
556239	2014 NK_{41}	—	September 11, 2002	Palomar	NEAT	·	960 m	MPC · JPL
556240	2014 NZ_{42}	—	July 3, 2014	Haleakala	Pan-STARRS 1	MAR	860 m	MPC · JPL
556241	2014 NA_{43}	—	May 7, 2014	Haleakala	Pan-STARRS 1	·	1.3 km	MPC · JPL
556242	2014 ND_{44}	—	February 3, 2003	Haleakala	NEAT	H	490 m	MPC · JPL
556243	2014 NE_{44}	—	November 15, 2006	Catalina	CSS	EUN	910 m	MPC · JPL
556244	2014 NZ_{44}	—	September 10, 2010	Kitt Peak	Spacewatch	EUN	780 m	MPC · JPL
556245	2014 NL_{47}	—	September 3, 2002	Palomar	NEAT	·	1.5 km	MPC · JPL
556246	2014 NL_{48}	—	April 12, 2013	Haleakala	Pan-STARRS 1	EUN	800 m	MPC · JPL
556247	2014 NX_{48}	—	August 28, 2006	Kitt Peak	Spacewatch	MAR	860 m	MPC · JPL
556248	2014 NT_{50}	—	July 24, 2003	Palomar	NEAT	·	880 m	MPC · JPL
556249	2014 NX_{50}	—	January 4, 2012	Mount Lemmon	Mount Lemmon Survey	MAR	770 m	MPC · JPL
556250	2014 NJ_{51}	—	September 14, 2002	Palomar	NEAT	·	1.1 km	MPC · JPL
556251	2014 NN_{51}	—	March 16, 2002	Kitt Peak	Spacewatch	·	1.0 km	MPC · JPL
556252	2014 NQ_{53}	—	May 4, 2006	Mount Lemmon	Mount Lemmon Survey	·	1.1 km	MPC · JPL
556253	2014 NR_{54}	—	September 12, 2002	Palomar	NEAT	·	1.4 km	MPC · JPL
556254	2014 NO_{56}	—	June 28, 2014	Haleakala	Pan-STARRS 1	·	1.2 km	MPC · JPL
556255	2014 NK_{63}	—	October 26, 2012	Haleakala	Pan-STARRS 1	H	510 m	MPC · JPL
556256	2014 NS_{67}	—	April 1, 2013	Mount Lemmon	Mount Lemmon Survey	(5)	1.0 km	MPC · JPL
556257	2014 NJ_{69}	—	December 21, 2003	Kitt Peak	Spacewatch	MAR	890 m	MPC · JPL
556258	2014 NS_{70}	—	July 7, 2014	Haleakala	Pan-STARRS 1	·	810 m	MPC · JPL
556259	2014 NW_{70}	—	July 7, 2014	Haleakala	Pan-STARRS 1	·	1.0 km	MPC · JPL
556260	2014 NL_{72}	—	July 8, 2014	Haleakala	Pan-STARRS 1	·	960 m	MPC · JPL
556261	2014 NB_{74}	—	July 5, 2014	Haleakala	Pan-STARRS 1	MAR	750 m	MPC · JPL
556262	2014 NM_{77}	—	July 5, 2014	Haleakala	Pan-STARRS 1	PHO	850 m	MPC · JPL
556263	2014 NM_{79}	—	October 28, 2011	Mount Lemmon	Mount Lemmon Survey	·	910 m	MPC · JPL
556264	2014 OZ	—	December 19, 2007	Kitt Peak	Spacewatch	·	1.2 km	MPC · JPL
556265	2014 OC_{1}	—	July 21, 2014	Elena Remote	Oreshko, A.	NYS	1.2 km	MPC · JPL
556266	2014 OX_{2}	—	August 16, 2006	Palomar	NEAT	·	1.2 km	MPC · JPL
556267	2014 OH_{4}	—	July 27, 2014	Haleakala	Pan-STARRS 1	H	500 m	MPC · JPL
556268	2014 OG_{8}	—	October 19, 2007	Catalina	CSS	·	1.3 km	MPC · JPL
556269	2014 OJ_{11}	—	July 25, 2014	Haleakala	Pan-STARRS 1	·	970 m	MPC · JPL
556270	2014 OU_{15}	—	October 21, 2007	Kitt Peak	Spacewatch	MAS	700 m	MPC · JPL
556271	2014 OQ_{18}	—	September 16, 2010	Mount Lemmon	Mount Lemmon Survey	·	1.8 km	MPC · JPL
556272	2014 OA_{22}	—	October 23, 2003	Apache Point	SDSS Collaboration	·	990 m	MPC · JPL
556273	2014 OB_{31}	—	June 25, 2014	Kitt Peak	Spacewatch	·	1.1 km	MPC · JPL
556274	2014 OL_{39}	—	June 27, 2014	Haleakala	Pan-STARRS 1	·	1.3 km	MPC · JPL
556275	2014 OX_{40}	—	July 25, 2014	Haleakala	Pan-STARRS 1	MAR	910 m	MPC · JPL
556276	2014 OW_{41}	—	August 30, 2002	Palomar	NEAT	·	840 m	MPC · JPL
556277	2014 ON_{46}	—	November 4, 2007	Mount Lemmon	Mount Lemmon Survey	MAS	490 m	MPC · JPL
556278	2014 OT_{48}	—	November 18, 2007	Mount Lemmon	Mount Lemmon Survey	·	810 m	MPC · JPL
556279	2014 OQ_{52}	—	June 27, 2014	Haleakala	Pan-STARRS 1	EUN	790 m	MPC · JPL
556280	2014 OM_{54}	—	July 25, 2014	Haleakala	Pan-STARRS 1	·	2.1 km	MPC · JPL
556281	2014 OY_{54}	—	July 3, 2014	Haleakala	Pan-STARRS 1	(2076)	670 m	MPC · JPL
556282	2014 OT_{55}	—	January 26, 2012	Mount Lemmon	Mount Lemmon Survey	·	1.2 km	MPC · JPL
556283	2014 OP_{58}	—	July 3, 2014	Haleakala	Pan-STARRS 1	·	860 m	MPC · JPL
556284	2014 OK_{60}	—	August 19, 2010	Kitt Peak	Spacewatch	·	1.0 km	MPC · JPL
556285	2014 OH_{70}	—	January 17, 2005	Kitt Peak	Spacewatch	·	2.8 km	MPC · JPL
556286	2014 OU_{71}	—	October 15, 2007	Mount Lemmon	Mount Lemmon Survey	·	730 m	MPC · JPL
556287	2014 OL_{73}	—	September 2, 2011	Haleakala	Pan-STARRS 1	V	580 m	MPC · JPL
556288	2014 ON_{73}	—	April 9, 2010	Mount Lemmon	Mount Lemmon Survey	·	1.3 km	MPC · JPL
556289	2014 OR_{73}	—	May 25, 2014	Haleakala	Pan-STARRS 1	PHO	1.0 km	MPC · JPL
556290	2014 OW_{73}	—	April 10, 2014	Haleakala	Pan-STARRS 1	H	400 m	MPC · JPL
556291	2014 OH_{74}	—	May 2, 2008	Kitt Peak	Spacewatch	·	3.6 km	MPC · JPL
556292	2014 OF_{75}	—	January 4, 2012	Kitt Peak	Spacewatch	·	1.1 km	MPC · JPL
556293	2014 OK_{77}	—	September 25, 2007	Mount Lemmon	Mount Lemmon Survey	·	1.4 km	MPC · JPL
556294	2014 OY_{78}	—	June 29, 2014	Mount Lemmon	Mount Lemmon Survey	·	1.0 km	MPC · JPL
556295	2014 OU_{79}	—	April 2, 2013	Mount Lemmon	Mount Lemmon Survey	·	1.0 km	MPC · JPL
556296	2014 OF_{80}	—	July 26, 2014	Haleakala	Pan-STARRS 1	·	990 m	MPC · JPL
556297	2014 OZ_{80}	—	February 16, 2002	Palomar	NEAT	NYS	1.2 km	MPC · JPL
556298	2014 ON_{82}	—	October 26, 2011	Haleakala	Pan-STARRS 1	·	840 m	MPC · JPL
556299	2014 OV_{82}	—	May 6, 2006	Mount Lemmon	Mount Lemmon Survey	NYS	1.1 km	MPC · JPL
556300	2014 OW_{83}	—	February 11, 2008	Mount Lemmon	Mount Lemmon Survey	·	1.4 km	MPC · JPL

== 556301–556400 ==
back to top

Designation			Discovery			Properties		Ref
Permanent	Provisional	Named after	Date	Site	Discoverer(s)	Category	Diam.	Ref
556301	2014 OL_{86}	—	July 2, 2014	Haleakala	Pan-STARRS 1	·	1.5 km	MPC · JPL
556302	2014 OC_{87}	—	April 30, 2006	Kitt Peak	Spacewatch	·	910 m	MPC · JPL
556303	2014 OY_{89}	—	December 6, 2007	Mount Lemmon	Mount Lemmon Survey	·	810 m	MPC · JPL
556304	2014 OW_{90}	—	July 26, 2014	Haleakala	Pan-STARRS 1	·	850 m	MPC · JPL
556305	2014 OW_{92}	—	November 20, 2003	Kitt Peak	Deep Ecliptic Survey	·	1.2 km	MPC · JPL
556306	2014 OW_{93}	—	July 26, 2014	Haleakala	Pan-STARRS 1	·	1.4 km	MPC · JPL
556307	2014 OY_{95}	—	September 4, 2010	Kitt Peak	Spacewatch	·	910 m	MPC · JPL
556308	2014 OR_{96}	—	November 16, 2010	Palomar	Palomar Transient Factory	·	1.9 km	MPC · JPL
556309	2014 OU_{97}	—	September 15, 2010	Mount Lemmon	Mount Lemmon Survey	·	890 m	MPC · JPL
556310	2014 OT_{100}	—	September 2, 2010	Mount Lemmon	Mount Lemmon Survey	·	970 m	MPC · JPL
556311	2014 OD_{102}	—	February 3, 2012	Mount Lemmon	Mount Lemmon Survey	·	1.6 km	MPC · JPL
556312	2014 OA_{103}	—	July 26, 2014	Haleakala	Pan-STARRS 1	EUN	1.1 km	MPC · JPL
556313	2014 OQ_{103}	—	November 24, 2011	Haleakala	Pan-STARRS 1	·	1.4 km	MPC · JPL
556314	2014 OU_{103}	—	January 30, 2003	Kitt Peak	Spacewatch	·	1.9 km	MPC · JPL
556315	2014 OY_{106}	—	December 5, 2007	Kitt Peak	Spacewatch	·	1.0 km	MPC · JPL
556316	2014 OB_{119}	—	August 28, 2006	Kitt Peak	Spacewatch	(5)	1.0 km	MPC · JPL
556317	2014 OC_{126}	—	November 5, 2007	Kitt Peak	Spacewatch	(5)	970 m	MPC · JPL
556318	2014 OB_{127}	—	March 19, 2009	Kitt Peak	Spacewatch	·	830 m	MPC · JPL
556319	2014 OK_{129}	—	April 22, 2007	Mount Lemmon	Mount Lemmon Survey	·	910 m	MPC · JPL
556320	2014 OQ_{132}	—	April 4, 2002	Palomar	NEAT	NYS	1.2 km	MPC · JPL
556321	2014 OR_{132}	—	March 20, 1998	Kitt Peak	Spacewatch	MAS	690 m	MPC · JPL
556322	2014 OY_{134}	—	October 12, 2007	Kitt Peak	Spacewatch	MAS	590 m	MPC · JPL
556323	2014 OW_{139}	—	May 2, 2006	Mount Lemmon	Mount Lemmon Survey	MAS	560 m	MPC · JPL
556324	2014 OQ_{144}	—	January 11, 2008	Kitt Peak	Spacewatch	·	950 m	MPC · JPL
556325	2014 OT_{146}	—	July 27, 2014	Haleakala	Pan-STARRS 1	·	990 m	MPC · JPL
556326	2014 OY_{146}	—	October 30, 2007	Mount Lemmon	Mount Lemmon Survey	MAS	520 m	MPC · JPL
556327	2014 OJ_{147}	—	July 27, 2014	Haleakala	Pan-STARRS 1	·	1.0 km	MPC · JPL
556328	2014 OV_{153}	—	November 12, 2007	Mount Lemmon	Mount Lemmon Survey	(5)	920 m	MPC · JPL
556329	2014 OP_{156}	—	May 25, 2014	Haleakala	Pan-STARRS 1	ERI	1.2 km	MPC · JPL
556330	2014 OO_{157}	—	June 20, 2002	Palomar	NEAT	·	1.2 km	MPC · JPL
556331	2014 OP_{157}	—	October 11, 2007	Mount Lemmon	Mount Lemmon Survey	·	840 m	MPC · JPL
556332	2014 OL_{162}	—	April 18, 2013	Mount Lemmon	Mount Lemmon Survey	ELF	3.0 km	MPC · JPL
556333	2014 OF_{164}	—	December 30, 2008	Mount Lemmon	Mount Lemmon Survey	·	1.2 km	MPC · JPL
556334	2014 OS_{164}	—	May 9, 2014	Haleakala	Pan-STARRS 1	·	1.1 km	MPC · JPL
556335	2014 OK_{171}	—	February 8, 2008	Mount Lemmon	Mount Lemmon Survey	·	1.7 km	MPC · JPL
556336	2014 OV_{175}	—	December 30, 2011	Kitt Peak	Spacewatch	·	1.2 km	MPC · JPL
556337	2014 OM_{176}	—	June 20, 2014	Haleakala	Pan-STARRS 1	V	610 m	MPC · JPL
556338	2014 OE_{179}	—	June 29, 2014	Haleakala	Pan-STARRS 1	·	870 m	MPC · JPL
556339	2014 OG_{179}	—	January 21, 2012	Catalina	CSS	EUN	990 m	MPC · JPL
556340	2014 OJ_{180}	—	September 28, 2003	Apache Point	SDSS	·	1.1 km	MPC · JPL
556341	2014 OP_{182}	—	June 26, 2014	Haleakala	Pan-STARRS 1	V	560 m	MPC · JPL
556342	2014 OD_{188}	—	August 30, 2005	Palomar	NEAT	·	2.4 km	MPC · JPL
556343	2014 OP_{188}	—	June 11, 2005	Catalina	CSS	·	1.6 km	MPC · JPL
556344	2014 OR_{188}	—	November 16, 2006	Kitt Peak	Spacewatch	·	1.0 km	MPC · JPL
556345	2014 OB_{189}	—	September 15, 2006	Kitt Peak	Spacewatch	·	740 m	MPC · JPL
556346	2014 OA_{191}	—	March 13, 2012	Mount Lemmon	Mount Lemmon Survey	·	1.7 km	MPC · JPL
556347	2014 OB_{192}	—	April 13, 2002	Kitt Peak	Spacewatch	NYS	1.5 km	MPC · JPL
556348	2014 OJ_{194}	—	March 15, 2001	Kitt Peak	Spacewatch	·	1.8 km	MPC · JPL
556349	2014 OS_{194}	—	August 31, 2005	Palomar	NEAT	·	1.7 km	MPC · JPL
556350	2014 OG_{195}	—	September 16, 2010	Kitt Peak	Spacewatch	(5)	920 m	MPC · JPL
556351	2014 OH_{198}	—	March 10, 2008	Mount Lemmon	Mount Lemmon Survey	H	560 m	MPC · JPL
556352	2014 OJ_{200}	—	September 27, 2003	Kitt Peak	Spacewatch	NYS	750 m	MPC · JPL
556353	2014 OZ_{202}	—	April 13, 2013	Kitt Peak	Spacewatch	·	2.5 km	MPC · JPL
556354	2014 OQ_{205}	—	March 1, 2009	Kitt Peak	Spacewatch	·	1.0 km	MPC · JPL
556355	2014 OO_{208}	—	January 22, 2004	Socorro	LINEAR	·	1.2 km	MPC · JPL
556356	2014 OT_{208}	—	May 7, 2014	Haleakala	Pan-STARRS 1	GEF	1.0 km	MPC · JPL
556357	2014 OV_{208}	—	July 25, 2014	Haleakala	Pan-STARRS 1	·	1.1 km	MPC · JPL
556358	2014 OD_{212}	—	June 30, 2014	Haleakala	Pan-STARRS 1	PHO	960 m	MPC · JPL
556359	2014 OS_{213}	—	October 4, 2002	Socorro	LINEAR	·	1.0 km	MPC · JPL
556360	2014 OP_{216}	—	July 27, 2014	Haleakala	Pan-STARRS 1	·	840 m	MPC · JPL
556361	2014 OT_{218}	—	March 17, 2009	Catalina	CSS	·	1.3 km	MPC · JPL
556362	2014 OG_{225}	—	February 7, 2008	Altschwendt	W. Ries	·	2.3 km	MPC · JPL
556363	2014 ON_{227}	—	January 30, 2012	Mount Lemmon	Mount Lemmon Survey	EUN	1.4 km	MPC · JPL
556364	2014 OE_{231}	—	August 21, 2001	Kitt Peak	Spacewatch	·	1.5 km	MPC · JPL
556365	2014 OO_{231}	—	August 23, 2003	Palomar	NEAT	·	2.7 km	MPC · JPL
556366	2014 OO_{235}	—	September 24, 2008	Mount Lemmon	Mount Lemmon Survey	·	600 m	MPC · JPL
556367	2014 OG_{236}	—	January 16, 2013	Haleakala	Pan-STARRS 1	PHO	900 m	MPC · JPL
556368	2014 OF_{238}	—	June 4, 2014	Haleakala	Pan-STARRS 1	MAS	580 m	MPC · JPL
556369	2014 OK_{238}	—	July 29, 2014	Haleakala	Pan-STARRS 1	·	950 m	MPC · JPL
556370	2014 OG_{239}	—	November 9, 2007	Kitt Peak	Spacewatch	·	930 m	MPC · JPL
556371	2014 OF_{242}	—	March 11, 2013	Mount Lemmon	Mount Lemmon Survey	·	1.1 km	MPC · JPL
556372	2014 OO_{249}	—	November 13, 2010	Mount Lemmon	Mount Lemmon Survey	·	2.5 km	MPC · JPL
556373	2014 OM_{250}	—	April 20, 2006	Kitt Peak	Spacewatch	·	1.1 km	MPC · JPL
556374	2014 OF_{259}	—	March 21, 2010	Kitt Peak	Spacewatch	·	950 m	MPC · JPL
556375	2014 OS_{259}	—	February 10, 2008	Kitt Peak	Spacewatch	·	1.6 km	MPC · JPL
556376	2014 OL_{262}	—	December 20, 2011	ESA OGS	ESA OGS	·	1.6 km	MPC · JPL
556377	2014 OB_{268}	—	October 3, 2006	Mount Lemmon	Mount Lemmon Survey	·	1.2 km	MPC · JPL
556378	2014 OR_{270}	—	December 18, 2007	Kitt Peak	Spacewatch	·	1.1 km	MPC · JPL
556379	2014 OV_{273}	—	July 29, 2014	Haleakala	Pan-STARRS 1	·	1.2 km	MPC · JPL
556380	2014 OH_{276}	—	December 29, 2011	Mount Lemmon	Mount Lemmon Survey	MAR	880 m	MPC · JPL
556381	2014 OE_{281}	—	July 29, 2014	Haleakala	Pan-STARRS 1	·	1.2 km	MPC · JPL
556382	2014 OJ_{286}	—	March 25, 2003	Palomar	NEAT	·	2.1 km	MPC · JPL
556383	2014 OX_{291}	—	October 31, 2006	Mount Lemmon	Mount Lemmon Survey	·	1.2 km	MPC · JPL
556384	2014 OZ_{294}	—	April 16, 2013	Cerro Tololo-DECam	DECam	·	950 m	MPC · JPL
556385	2014 OX_{295}	—	March 14, 2012	Mount Lemmon	Mount Lemmon Survey	EUN	1.2 km	MPC · JPL
556386	2014 OU_{299}	—	September 18, 2003	Palomar	NEAT	·	960 m	MPC · JPL
556387	2014 OE_{306}	—	April 10, 2013	Haleakala	Pan-STARRS 1	·	930 m	MPC · JPL
556388	2014 ON_{306}	—	October 8, 2007	Mount Lemmon	Mount Lemmon Survey	·	1.1 km	MPC · JPL
556389	2014 OS_{309}	—	July 27, 2014	Haleakala	Pan-STARRS 1	·	760 m	MPC · JPL
556390	2014 OF_{317}	—	February 12, 2008	Kitt Peak	Spacewatch	H	410 m	MPC · JPL
556391	2014 OP_{319}	—	August 28, 2006	Pises	Pises	·	860 m	MPC · JPL
556392	2014 ON_{324}	—	May 7, 2010	Mount Lemmon	Mount Lemmon Survey	NYS	1.0 km	MPC · JPL
556393	2014 OT_{330}	—	July 29, 2014	Haleakala	Pan-STARRS 1	·	1.1 km	MPC · JPL
556394	2014 OT_{336}	—	May 9, 2006	Mount Lemmon	Mount Lemmon Survey	V	590 m	MPC · JPL
556395	2014 OP_{342}	—	June 28, 2014	Kitt Peak	Spacewatch	·	970 m	MPC · JPL
556396	2014 OT_{343}	—	July 26, 2005	Palomar	NEAT	·	2.0 km	MPC · JPL
556397	2014 OE_{349}	—	October 3, 2006	Mount Lemmon	Mount Lemmon Survey	·	1.2 km	MPC · JPL
556398	2014 OL_{354}	—	June 2, 2014	Haleakala	Pan-STARRS 1	·	1.0 km	MPC · JPL
556399	2014 OS_{356}	—	July 28, 2014	Haleakala	Pan-STARRS 1	EOS	1.4 km	MPC · JPL
556400	2014 ON_{358}	—	January 30, 2012	Kitt Peak	Spacewatch	·	1.2 km	MPC · JPL

== 556401–556500 ==
back to top

Designation			Discovery			Properties		Ref
Permanent	Provisional	Named after	Date	Site	Discoverer(s)	Category	Diam.	Ref
556401	2014 OS_{358}	—	July 28, 2014	Haleakala	Pan-STARRS 1	MAR	800 m	MPC · JPL
556402	2014 OK_{359}	—	July 5, 2005	Mount Lemmon	Mount Lemmon Survey	·	1.3 km	MPC · JPL
556403	2014 OR_{359}	—	July 28, 2014	Haleakala	Pan-STARRS 1	·	830 m	MPC · JPL
556404	2014 OE_{363}	—	January 30, 2009	Mount Lemmon	Mount Lemmon Survey	MAS	740 m	MPC · JPL
556405	2014 OX_{368}	—	November 13, 2006	Mount Lemmon	Mount Lemmon Survey	·	810 m	MPC · JPL
556406	2014 OL_{371}	—	February 5, 2013	Kitt Peak	Spacewatch	MAS	560 m	MPC · JPL
556407	2014 OQ_{373}	—	April 2, 2006	Kitt Peak	Spacewatch	·	780 m	MPC · JPL
556408	2014 OW_{375}	—	June 27, 2014	Haleakala	Pan-STARRS 1	·	940 m	MPC · JPL
556409	2014 OQ_{381}	—	September 2, 2010	Mount Lemmon	Mount Lemmon Survey	(5)	1.1 km	MPC · JPL
556410	2014 OY_{381}	—	June 4, 2014	Haleakala	Pan-STARRS 1	·	840 m	MPC · JPL
556411	2014 OD_{383}	—	January 18, 2008	Mount Lemmon	Mount Lemmon Survey	·	1.1 km	MPC · JPL
556412	2014 OB_{389}	—	July 28, 2014	Haleakala	Pan-STARRS 1	·	800 m	MPC · JPL
556413	2014 OL_{390}	—	October 21, 2007	Mount Lemmon	Mount Lemmon Survey	·	1.2 km	MPC · JPL
556414	2014 OR_{390}	—	January 16, 2005	Mauna Kea	Veillet, C.	·	1.2 km	MPC · JPL
556415	2014 OL_{391}	—	August 12, 2010	Kitt Peak	Spacewatch	EUN	980 m	MPC · JPL
556416	2014 OE_{394}	—	July 28, 2014	Haleakala	Pan-STARRS 1	cubewano (cold)	401 km	MPC · JPL
556417	2014 OT_{398}	—	November 20, 2001	Socorro	LINEAR	·	1.2 km	MPC · JPL
556418	2014 OW_{399}	—	October 19, 2003	Apache Point	SDSS Collaboration	·	1.0 km	MPC · JPL
556419	2014 OK_{400}	—	February 23, 2012	Mount Lemmon	Mount Lemmon Survey	·	1.7 km	MPC · JPL
556420	2014 OL_{400}	—	July 25, 2014	Haleakala	Pan-STARRS 1	·	1.3 km	MPC · JPL
556421	2014 OU_{400}	—	November 19, 2006	Catalina	CSS	(5)	1.4 km	MPC · JPL
556422	2014 OV_{400}	—	April 17, 2013	Haleakala	Pan-STARRS 1	·	1.4 km	MPC · JPL
556423	2014 OC_{401}	—	May 7, 2014	Haleakala	Pan-STARRS 1	·	1.0 km	MPC · JPL
556424	2014 OJ_{401}	—	March 14, 2007	Kitt Peak	Spacewatch	TEL	1.5 km	MPC · JPL
556425	2014 OS_{401}	—	June 26, 2014	Kitt Peak	Spacewatch	·	1.7 km	MPC · JPL
556426	2014 OW_{401}	—	September 12, 2002	Palomar	NEAT	·	1.1 km	MPC · JPL
556427	2014 OZ_{401}	—	July 28, 2014	Haleakala	Pan-STARRS 1	RAF	750 m	MPC · JPL
556428	2014 OM_{402}	—	July 25, 2014	Haleakala	Pan-STARRS 1	·	770 m	MPC · JPL
556429	2014 OP_{403}	—	February 8, 1999	Mauna Kea	Anderson, J., Veillet, C.	·	1.1 km	MPC · JPL
556430	2014 OD_{404}	—	July 25, 2014	Haleakala	Pan-STARRS 1	·	1.1 km	MPC · JPL
556431	2014 OS_{404}	—	January 3, 2012	Mount Lemmon	Mount Lemmon Survey	·	1.5 km	MPC · JPL
556432	2014 OL_{405}	—	July 25, 2014	Haleakala	Pan-STARRS 1	·	760 m	MPC · JPL
556433	2014 OD_{406}	—	December 16, 2007	Kitt Peak	Spacewatch	·	1.1 km	MPC · JPL
556434	2014 OL_{409}	—	February 5, 2009	Kitt Peak	Spacewatch	·	970 m	MPC · JPL
556435	2014 OG_{410}	—	July 26, 2014	Haleakala	Pan-STARRS 1	·	890 m	MPC · JPL
556436	2014 OD_{412}	—	April 2, 2009	Kitt Peak	Spacewatch	·	890 m	MPC · JPL
556437	2014 OA_{414}	—	July 30, 2014	Haleakala	Pan-STARRS 1	·	790 m	MPC · JPL
556438	2014 OG_{414}	—	July 31, 2014	Haleakala	Pan-STARRS 1	EUN	840 m	MPC · JPL
556439	2014 OL_{415}	—	October 1, 2003	Anderson Mesa	LONEOS	PHO	1.0 km	MPC · JPL
556440	2014 OP_{415}	—	August 19, 2001	Cerro Tololo	Deep Ecliptic Survey	·	1.4 km	MPC · JPL
556441	2014 OE_{429}	—	July 31, 2014	Haleakala	Pan-STARRS 1	MAR	750 m	MPC · JPL
556442	2014 OZ_{432}	—	July 29, 2014	Haleakala	Pan-STARRS 1	(5)	890 m	MPC · JPL
556443	2014 OS_{441}	—	July 30, 2014	Haleakala	Pan-STARRS 1	·	1.5 km	MPC · JPL
556444	2014 OG_{443}	—	July 28, 2014	Haleakala	Pan-STARRS 1	·	1.6 km	MPC · JPL
556445	2014 PD_{1}	—	July 25, 2014	Haleakala	Pan-STARRS 1	·	1.0 km	MPC · JPL
556446	2014 PY_{1}	—	April 2, 2006	Kitt Peak	Spacewatch	NYS	910 m	MPC · JPL
556447	2014 PM_{2}	—	January 1, 2012	Mount Lemmon	Mount Lemmon Survey	·	990 m	MPC · JPL
556448	2014 PV_{5}	—	June 30, 2014	Haleakala	Pan-STARRS 1	·	1.3 km	MPC · JPL
556449	2014 PQ_{7}	—	November 7, 2007	Mount Lemmon	Mount Lemmon Survey	·	940 m	MPC · JPL
556450	2014 PT_{8}	—	August 22, 2003	Palomar	NEAT	·	1.4 km	MPC · JPL
556451	2014 PU_{8}	—	October 5, 2003	Kitt Peak	Spacewatch	·	930 m	MPC · JPL
556452	2014 PT_{9}	—	May 26, 2006	Mount Lemmon	Mount Lemmon Survey	MAS	500 m	MPC · JPL
556453	2014 PA_{12}	—	December 22, 2008	Kitt Peak	Spacewatch	·	920 m	MPC · JPL
556454	2014 PR_{13}	—	July 25, 2014	Haleakala	Pan-STARRS 1	·	950 m	MPC · JPL
556455	2014 PO_{17}	—	January 30, 2012	Kitt Peak	Spacewatch	·	1 km	MPC · JPL
556456	2014 PV_{18}	—	August 18, 2006	Kitt Peak	Spacewatch	·	780 m	MPC · JPL
556457	2014 PP_{23}	—	June 24, 2014	Haleakala	Pan-STARRS 1	·	1.1 km	MPC · JPL
556458	2014 PP_{28}	—	July 25, 2014	Haleakala	Pan-STARRS 1	·	920 m	MPC · JPL
556459	2014 PE_{30}	—	October 16, 2006	Catalina	CSS	·	1.7 km	MPC · JPL
556460	2014 PL_{31}	—	October 17, 2006	Catalina	CSS	·	1.3 km	MPC · JPL
556461	2014 PA_{34}	—	July 25, 2014	Haleakala	Pan-STARRS 1	MAR	880 m	MPC · JPL
556462	2014 PF_{36}	—	April 10, 2013	Mount Lemmon	Mount Lemmon Survey	·	960 m	MPC · JPL
556463	2014 PX_{36}	—	March 3, 2009	Mount Lemmon	Mount Lemmon Survey	V	650 m	MPC · JPL
556464	2014 PU_{37}	—	July 26, 2014	Haleakala	Pan-STARRS 1	·	1.0 km	MPC · JPL
556465	2014 PF_{38}	—	August 3, 2014	Haleakala	Pan-STARRS 1	H	440 m	MPC · JPL
556466	2014 PT_{39}	—	July 28, 2014	Haleakala	Pan-STARRS 1	RAF	840 m	MPC · JPL
556467	2014 PN_{43}	—	September 19, 2001	Apache Point	SDSS Collaboration	·	1.6 km	MPC · JPL
556468	2014 PP_{43}	—	August 4, 2014	Haleakala	Pan-STARRS 1	·	1.6 km	MPC · JPL
556469	2014 PD_{51}	—	August 4, 2014	Haleakala	Pan-STARRS 1	·	1.5 km	MPC · JPL
556470	2014 PN_{53}	—	June 21, 2010	Mount Lemmon	Mount Lemmon Survey	MAS	580 m	MPC · JPL
556471	2014 PY_{53}	—	April 10, 2013	Mount Lemmon	Mount Lemmon Survey	MAR	1.0 km	MPC · JPL
556472	2014 PG_{55}	—	October 17, 2010	Mount Lemmon	Mount Lemmon Survey	·	1.4 km	MPC · JPL
556473	2014 PL_{60}	—	September 30, 2007	Kitt Peak	Spacewatch	·	1.5 km	MPC · JPL
556474	2014 PT_{60}	—	June 24, 2014	Mount Lemmon	Mount Lemmon Survey	·	1.8 km	MPC · JPL
556475	2014 PC_{61}	—	June 20, 2014	Haleakala	Pan-STARRS 1	·	1.2 km	MPC · JPL
556476	2014 PU_{62}	—	July 8, 2003	Palomar	NEAT	·	1.2 km	MPC · JPL
556477	2014 PG_{64}	—	July 27, 2014	ESA OGS	ESA OGS	·	1.0 km	MPC · JPL
556478	2014 PZ_{65}	—	June 2, 2014	Mount Lemmon	Mount Lemmon Survey	MAS	650 m	MPC · JPL
556479	2014 PK_{67}	—	July 25, 2014	Haleakala	Pan-STARRS 1	ADE	1.7 km	MPC · JPL
556480	2014 PJ_{72}	—	March 15, 2008	Mount Lemmon	Mount Lemmon Survey	·	1.8 km	MPC · JPL
556481	2014 PA_{73}	—	August 3, 2014	Haleakala	Pan-STARRS 1	·	1.3 km	MPC · JPL
556482	2014 PX_{74}	—	August 3, 2014	Haleakala	Pan-STARRS 1	EOS	1.3 km	MPC · JPL
556483	2014 PY_{76}	—	October 6, 2002	Palomar	NEAT	·	1.2 km	MPC · JPL
556484	2014 PW_{77}	—	August 6, 2014	Haleakala	Pan-STARRS 1	·	1.4 km	MPC · JPL
556485	2014 PV_{79}	—	July 25, 2014	Haleakala	Pan-STARRS 1	NYS	930 m	MPC · JPL
556486	2014 PA_{81}	—	September 15, 2006	Kitt Peak	Spacewatch	·	1.2 km	MPC · JPL
556487	2014 PK_{81}	—	September 14, 2006	Kitt Peak	Spacewatch	(5)	1.2 km	MPC · JPL
556488	2014 PC_{82}	—	February 7, 2008	Mount Lemmon	Mount Lemmon Survey	·	1.6 km	MPC · JPL
556489	2014 PE_{82}	—	January 17, 2004	Kitt Peak	Spacewatch	·	1.3 km	MPC · JPL
556490	2014 PF_{90}	—	July 4, 2014	Haleakala	Pan-STARRS 1	LIX	2.8 km	MPC · JPL
556491	2014 QW_{1}	—	September 25, 2003	Palomar	NEAT	·	3.1 km	MPC · JPL
556492	2014 QQ_{4}	—	June 3, 2014	Haleakala	Pan-STARRS 1	MAR	980 m	MPC · JPL
556493	2014 QE_{5}	—	June 3, 2014	Haleakala	Pan-STARRS 1	HNS	990 m	MPC · JPL
556494	2014 QW_{5}	—	September 6, 2010	Mount Lemmon	Mount Lemmon Survey	EUN	1.1 km	MPC · JPL
556495	2014 QU_{6}	—	August 18, 2014	Haleakala	Pan-STARRS 1	·	2.0 km	MPC · JPL
556496	2014 QW_{6}	—	June 1, 2014	Haleakala	Pan-STARRS 1	·	1.1 km	MPC · JPL
556497	2014 QA_{13}	—	June 30, 2014	Mount Lemmon	Mount Lemmon Survey	·	1.0 km	MPC · JPL
556498	2014 QP_{13}	—	September 4, 2010	Mount Lemmon	Mount Lemmon Survey	·	1.4 km	MPC · JPL
556499	2014 QR_{14}	—	August 18, 2014	Haleakala	Pan-STARRS 1	·	1.6 km	MPC · JPL
556500	2014 QV_{18}	—	February 5, 2013	Kitt Peak	Spacewatch	·	970 m	MPC · JPL

== 556501–556600 ==
back to top

Designation			Discovery			Properties		Ref
Permanent	Provisional	Named after	Date	Site	Discoverer(s)	Category	Diam.	Ref
556501	2014 QY_{18}	—	October 2, 2006	Kitt Peak	Spacewatch	·	700 m	MPC · JPL
556502	2014 QZ_{18}	—	August 18, 2014	Haleakala	Pan-STARRS 1	H	430 m	MPC · JPL
556503	2014 QK_{19}	—	September 20, 2006	Kitt Peak	Spacewatch	·	960 m	MPC · JPL
556504	2014 QA_{20}	—	August 6, 2014	Haleakala	Pan-STARRS 1	V	570 m	MPC · JPL
556505	2014 QN_{22}	—	July 11, 2010	WISE	WISE	·	1.1 km	MPC · JPL
556506	2014 QQ_{22}	—	June 24, 2014	Haleakala	Pan-STARRS 1	·	1.0 km	MPC · JPL
556507	2014 QU_{22}	—	June 26, 2014	Mount Lemmon	Mount Lemmon Survey	·	1.2 km	MPC · JPL
556508	2014 QJ_{23}	—	November 16, 2006	Kitt Peak	Spacewatch	·	1.2 km	MPC · JPL
556509	2014 QN_{23}	—	November 18, 2003	Palomar	NEAT	·	1.3 km	MPC · JPL
556510	2014 QV_{24}	—	July 8, 2005	Kitt Peak	Spacewatch	·	1.4 km	MPC · JPL
556511	2014 QG_{26}	—	September 16, 2010	Mount Lemmon	Mount Lemmon Survey	·	1.4 km	MPC · JPL
556512	2014 QM_{28}	—	September 23, 2005	Junk Bond	D. Healy	·	1.6 km	MPC · JPL
556513	2014 QP_{28}	—	July 30, 2001	Palomar	NEAT	H	650 m	MPC · JPL
556514	2014 QC_{29}	—	July 7, 2014	Haleakala	Pan-STARRS 1	·	1.0 km	MPC · JPL
556515	2014 QF_{29}	—	October 14, 2010	Mount Lemmon	Mount Lemmon Survey	·	1.1 km	MPC · JPL
556516	2014 QC_{31}	—	August 18, 2014	Haleakala	Pan-STARRS 1	·	1.7 km	MPC · JPL
556517	2014 QX_{31}	—	November 12, 2010	Mount Lemmon	Mount Lemmon Survey	EUN	1.2 km	MPC · JPL
556518	2014 QY_{31}	—	August 18, 2014	Haleakala	Pan-STARRS 1	·	1.2 km	MPC · JPL
556519	2014 QE_{36}	—	October 22, 2003	Kitt Peak	Spacewatch	·	1.2 km	MPC · JPL
556520	2014 QU_{36}	—	September 15, 2010	Catalina	CSS	(194)	1.6 km	MPC · JPL
556521	2014 QM_{38}	—	April 10, 2005	Kitt Peak	Spacewatch	·	1.7 km	MPC · JPL
556522	2014 QS_{39}	—	March 15, 2012	Mount Lemmon	Mount Lemmon Survey	·	1.6 km	MPC · JPL
556523	2014 QH_{40}	—	November 4, 2002	Palomar	NEAT	(5)	970 m	MPC · JPL
556524	2014 QP_{42}	—	October 19, 2006	Kitt Peak	Deep Ecliptic Survey	·	1.4 km	MPC · JPL
556525	2014 QT_{42}	—	October 7, 2010	Kitt Peak	Spacewatch	·	1.2 km	MPC · JPL
556526	2014 QL_{43}	—	March 13, 2013	Palomar	Palomar Transient Factory	·	1.2 km	MPC · JPL
556527	2014 QZ_{46}	—	July 7, 2014	Haleakala	Pan-STARRS 1	·	1.5 km	MPC · JPL
556528	2014 QR_{48}	—	June 30, 2014	Haleakala	Pan-STARRS 1	·	2.8 km	MPC · JPL
556529	2014 QX_{48}	—	October 8, 2007	Mount Lemmon	Mount Lemmon Survey	V	500 m	MPC · JPL
556530	2014 QR_{49}	—	March 19, 2013	Haleakala	Pan-STARRS 1	·	1.9 km	MPC · JPL
556531	2014 QZ_{55}	—	November 20, 2003	Kitt Peak	Deep Ecliptic Survey	·	910 m	MPC · JPL
556532	2014 QZ_{57}	—	June 29, 2014	Haleakala	Pan-STARRS 1	·	880 m	MPC · JPL
556533	2014 QT_{66}	—	November 12, 2007	Mount Lemmon	Mount Lemmon Survey	·	910 m	MPC · JPL
556534	2014 QK_{67}	—	July 1, 2014	Haleakala	Pan-STARRS 1	·	1.5 km	MPC · JPL
556535	2014 QC_{68}	—	March 14, 2013	Palomar	Palomar Transient Factory	·	1.2 km	MPC · JPL
556536	2014 QF_{68}	—	July 1, 2014	Haleakala	Pan-STARRS 1	EOS	1.2 km	MPC · JPL
556537	2014 QM_{68}	—	August 22, 2006	Cerro Tololo	Deep Ecliptic Survey	·	1.2 km	MPC · JPL
556538	2014 QP_{70}	—	October 29, 2010	Mount Lemmon	Mount Lemmon Survey	·	1.6 km	MPC · JPL
556539	2014 QH_{71}	—	September 25, 2006	Kitt Peak	Spacewatch	·	1.4 km	MPC · JPL
556540	2014 QK_{71}	—	November 28, 2011	Mount Lemmon	Mount Lemmon Survey	ADE	1.6 km	MPC · JPL
556541	2014 QZ_{71}	—	July 29, 2009	Kitt Peak	Spacewatch	EOS	1.5 km	MPC · JPL
556542	2014 QS_{72}	—	October 13, 2007	Mount Lemmon	Mount Lemmon Survey	V	710 m	MPC · JPL
556543	2014 QE_{73}	—	April 30, 2006	Kitt Peak	Spacewatch	·	1.0 km	MPC · JPL
556544	2014 QL_{76}	—	April 16, 2013	Cerro Tololo-DECam	DECam	·	1.2 km	MPC · JPL
556545	2014 QS_{76}	—	September 10, 2007	Mount Lemmon	Mount Lemmon Survey	·	1.3 km	MPC · JPL
556546	2014 QF_{81}	—	August 20, 2014	Haleakala	Pan-STARRS 1	EUN	870 m	MPC · JPL
556547	2014 QD_{91}	—	January 3, 2012	Mount Lemmon	Mount Lemmon Survey	·	2.2 km	MPC · JPL
556548	2014 QM_{92}	—	April 10, 2013	Mount Lemmon	Mount Lemmon Survey	MAR	770 m	MPC · JPL
556549	2014 QA_{95}	—	January 18, 2009	Kitt Peak	Spacewatch	·	1.3 km	MPC · JPL
556550	2014 QU_{95}	—	December 25, 2011	Mount Lemmon	Mount Lemmon Survey	·	1.6 km	MPC · JPL
556551	2014 QC_{107}	—	February 6, 2007	Mount Lemmon	Mount Lemmon Survey	(18466)	1.7 km	MPC · JPL
556552	2014 QM_{108}	—	October 1, 2003	Kitt Peak	Spacewatch	ERI	990 m	MPC · JPL
556553	2014 QO_{111}	—	March 15, 2013	Catalina	CSS	·	1.2 km	MPC · JPL
556554	2014 QW_{112}	—	October 26, 2011	Haleakala	Pan-STARRS 1	(5)	1.1 km	MPC · JPL
556555	2014 QA_{113}	—	March 15, 2013	Mount Lemmon	Mount Lemmon Survey	GEF	810 m	MPC · JPL
556556	2014 QS_{116}	—	February 25, 2011	Mount Lemmon	Mount Lemmon Survey	SYL	3.0 km	MPC · JPL
556557	2014 QY_{118}	—	September 2, 2010	Mount Lemmon	Mount Lemmon Survey	·	1.0 km	MPC · JPL
556558	2014 QJ_{123}	—	March 15, 2004	Kitt Peak	Spacewatch	·	980 m	MPC · JPL
556559	2014 QS_{123}	—	January 16, 2005	Mauna Kea	Veillet, C.	MAS	680 m	MPC · JPL
556560	2014 QK_{138}	—	October 15, 1995	Kitt Peak	Spacewatch	·	1.0 km	MPC · JPL
556561	2014 QF_{142}	—	August 18, 2006	Kitt Peak	Spacewatch	·	860 m	MPC · JPL
556562	2014 QC_{144}	—	February 22, 2004	Kitt Peak	Spacewatch	·	950 m	MPC · JPL
556563	2014 QZ_{150}	—	August 20, 2014	Haleakala	Pan-STARRS 1	MAR	740 m	MPC · JPL
556564	2014 QB_{151}	—	August 20, 2001	Cerro Tololo	Deep Ecliptic Survey	·	1.1 km	MPC · JPL
556565	2014 QM_{151}	—	July 10, 2005	Kitt Peak	Spacewatch	EUN	1.1 km	MPC · JPL
556566	2014 QN_{151}	—	February 22, 2012	Kitt Peak	Spacewatch	HNS	1.0 km	MPC · JPL
556567	2014 QK_{155}	—	August 22, 2014	Haleakala	Pan-STARRS 1	MAR	900 m	MPC · JPL
556568	2014 QS_{155}	—	August 22, 2014	Haleakala	Pan-STARRS 1	·	1.3 km	MPC · JPL
556569	2014 QM_{161}	—	April 11, 2013	Kitt Peak	Spacewatch	·	2.2 km	MPC · JPL
556570	2014 QW_{161}	—	August 13, 2010	Kitt Peak	Spacewatch	·	1.2 km	MPC · JPL
556571	2014 QA_{162}	—	October 15, 2007	Mount Lemmon	Mount Lemmon Survey	·	900 m	MPC · JPL
556572	2014 QF_{162}	—	January 5, 2013	Kitt Peak	Spacewatch	NYS	1.1 km	MPC · JPL
556573	2014 QZ_{162}	—	October 26, 2011	Haleakala	Pan-STARRS 1	·	1.1 km	MPC · JPL
556574	2014 QA_{164}	—	September 19, 2003	Kitt Peak	Spacewatch	PHO	650 m	MPC · JPL
556575	2014 QN_{166}	—	May 24, 2011	Haleakala	Pan-STARRS 1	H	430 m	MPC · JPL
556576	2014 QU_{168}	—	August 20, 2014	Haleakala	Pan-STARRS 1	·	470 m	MPC · JPL
556577	2014 QN_{169}	—	July 30, 2014	Kitt Peak	Spacewatch	H	420 m	MPC · JPL
556578	2014 QM_{172}	—	February 25, 2007	Mount Lemmon	Mount Lemmon Survey	EOS	1.4 km	MPC · JPL
556579	2014 QG_{173}	—	April 1, 2009	Kitt Peak	Spacewatch	·	910 m	MPC · JPL
556580	2014 QZ_{175}	—	October 11, 2010	Mount Lemmon	Mount Lemmon Survey	·	1.2 km	MPC · JPL
556581	2014 QE_{176}	—	February 9, 2013	Haleakala	Pan-STARRS 1	NYS	770 m	MPC · JPL
556582	2014 QD_{181}	—	August 22, 2014	Haleakala	Pan-STARRS 1	·	1.2 km	MPC · JPL
556583	2014 QD_{183}	—	August 28, 2006	Catalina	CSS	·	870 m	MPC · JPL
556584	2014 QR_{183}	—	August 22, 2014	Haleakala	Pan-STARRS 1	·	1.1 km	MPC · JPL
556585	2014 QE_{189}	—	April 15, 2013	Haleakala	Pan-STARRS 1	·	1.2 km	MPC · JPL
556586	2014 QH_{190}	—	December 20, 2007	Mount Lemmon	Mount Lemmon Survey	·	2.4 km	MPC · JPL
556587	2014 QM_{191}	—	December 31, 2007	Kitt Peak	Spacewatch	·	1.0 km	MPC · JPL
556588	2014 QU_{191}	—	December 31, 2008	Kitt Peak	Spacewatch	·	1.2 km	MPC · JPL
556589	2014 QK_{200}	—	August 22, 2014	Haleakala	Pan-STARRS 1	·	1.3 km	MPC · JPL
556590	2014 QD_{205}	—	February 15, 2013	Haleakala	Pan-STARRS 1	NYS	1.1 km	MPC · JPL
556591	2014 QO_{205}	—	September 18, 2010	Mount Lemmon	Mount Lemmon Survey	·	1.3 km	MPC · JPL
556592	2014 QO_{207}	—	October 29, 2010	Catalina	CSS	·	1.5 km	MPC · JPL
556593	2014 QA_{209}	—	August 3, 2014	Haleakala	Pan-STARRS 1	·	1.4 km	MPC · JPL
556594	2014 QY_{209}	—	August 22, 2014	Haleakala	Pan-STARRS 1	·	2.0 km	MPC · JPL
556595	2014 QZ_{211}	—	September 15, 2006	Kitt Peak	Spacewatch	·	1.0 km	MPC · JPL
556596	2014 QJ_{212}	—	September 18, 2001	Kitt Peak	Spacewatch	·	1.2 km	MPC · JPL
556597	2014 QG_{215}	—	October 2, 2010	Kitt Peak	Spacewatch	·	1.0 km	MPC · JPL
556598	2014 QU_{219}	—	July 30, 2014	Kitt Peak	Spacewatch	·	970 m	MPC · JPL
556599	2014 QE_{220}	—	September 17, 2006	Kitt Peak	Spacewatch	·	1.3 km	MPC · JPL
556600	2014 QG_{223}	—	April 12, 2013	Haleakala	Pan-STARRS 1	·	1.3 km	MPC · JPL

== 556601–556700 ==
back to top

Designation			Discovery			Properties		Ref
Permanent	Provisional	Named after	Date	Site	Discoverer(s)	Category	Diam.	Ref
556601	2014 QW_{224}	—	April 10, 2000	Kitt Peak	M. W. Buie	·	1.2 km	MPC · JPL
556602	2014 QR_{228}	—	January 10, 2008	Mount Lemmon	Mount Lemmon Survey	·	1.3 km	MPC · JPL
556603	2014 QB_{229}	—	July 5, 2010	Kitt Peak	Spacewatch	·	1.0 km	MPC · JPL
556604	2014 QY_{229}	—	December 16, 2003	Kitt Peak	Spacewatch	·	950 m	MPC · JPL
556605	2014 QA_{231}	—	August 22, 2014	Haleakala	Pan-STARRS 1	·	960 m	MPC · JPL
556606	2014 QH_{233}	—	April 1, 2009	Cerro Burek	Burek, Cerro	·	1.6 km	MPC · JPL
556607	2014 QU_{236}	—	September 30, 2006	Kitt Peak	Spacewatch	·	960 m	MPC · JPL
556608	2014 QC_{237}	—	August 20, 2014	Haleakala	Pan-STARRS 1	·	1.1 km	MPC · JPL
556609	2014 QH_{237}	—	August 27, 2006	Kitt Peak	Spacewatch	·	620 m	MPC · JPL
556610	2014 QB_{238}	—	October 19, 2003	Apache Point	SDSS Collaboration	NYS	1.2 km	MPC · JPL
556611	2014 QE_{238}	—	August 20, 2014	Haleakala	Pan-STARRS 1	·	1.0 km	MPC · JPL
556612	2014 QG_{239}	—	November 8, 2010	Mount Lemmon	Mount Lemmon Survey	HOF	2.0 km	MPC · JPL
556613	2014 QW_{241}	—	September 30, 2010	Mount Lemmon	Mount Lemmon Survey	·	1.2 km	MPC · JPL
556614	2014 QD_{250}	—	August 22, 2014	Haleakala	Pan-STARRS 1	DOR	2.0 km	MPC · JPL
556615	2014 QG_{250}	—	May 16, 2009	Mount Lemmon	Mount Lemmon Survey	MAR	880 m	MPC · JPL
556616	2014 QN_{252}	—	April 15, 2008	Mount Lemmon	Mount Lemmon Survey	·	2.0 km	MPC · JPL
556617	2014 QT_{254}	—	January 10, 2007	Mount Lemmon	Mount Lemmon Survey	EUN	1.2 km	MPC · JPL
556618	2014 QX_{254}	—	August 22, 2014	Haleakala	Pan-STARRS 1	·	1.8 km	MPC · JPL
556619	2014 QA_{255}	—	August 22, 2014	Haleakala	Pan-STARRS 1	·	1.5 km	MPC · JPL
556620	2014 QJ_{255}	—	September 30, 2006	Apache Point	SDSS Collaboration	·	1.6 km	MPC · JPL
556621	2014 QR_{256}	—	January 26, 2003	Palomar	NEAT	·	1.8 km	MPC · JPL
556622	2014 QK_{259}	—	August 22, 2014	Haleakala	Pan-STARRS 1	·	1.2 km	MPC · JPL
556623	2014 QY_{260}	—	August 22, 2014	Haleakala	Pan-STARRS 1	·	1.1 km	MPC · JPL
556624	2014 QZ_{261}	—	October 2, 2010	Mount Lemmon	Mount Lemmon Survey	·	1.5 km	MPC · JPL
556625	2014 QH_{265}	—	December 30, 2007	Kitt Peak	Spacewatch	EUN	1.2 km	MPC · JPL
556626	2014 QR_{265}	—	October 30, 2010	Mount Lemmon	Mount Lemmon Survey	·	1.3 km	MPC · JPL
556627	2014 QA_{268}	—	August 6, 2005	Siding Spring	SSS	ADE	2.1 km	MPC · JPL
556628	2014 QS_{273}	—	August 29, 2006	Kitt Peak	Spacewatch	·	720 m	MPC · JPL
556629	2014 QZ_{273}	—	August 22, 2014	Haleakala	Pan-STARRS 1	·	1.3 km	MPC · JPL
556630	2014 QL_{281}	—	August 24, 2014	Haleakala	Pan-STARRS 1	H	400 m	MPC · JPL
556631	2014 QN_{283}	—	October 22, 2003	Apache Point	SDSS	·	1.2 km	MPC · JPL
556632	2014 QY_{283}	—	August 25, 2014	Haleakala	Pan-STARRS 1	·	1.1 km	MPC · JPL
556633	2014 QS_{285}	—	August 25, 2014	Haleakala	Pan-STARRS 1	BRA	1.3 km	MPC · JPL
556634	2014 QR_{288}	—	November 2, 2010	Mount Lemmon	Mount Lemmon Survey	JUN	900 m	MPC · JPL
556635	2014 QS_{289}	—	May 1, 2009	Mount Lemmon	Mount Lemmon Survey	MAR	980 m	MPC · JPL
556636	2014 QA_{290}	—	August 25, 2014	Haleakala	Pan-STARRS 1	·	1.5 km	MPC · JPL
556637	2014 QK_{290}	—	October 20, 2006	Mount Lemmon	Mount Lemmon Survey	·	1.5 km	MPC · JPL
556638	2014 QT_{290}	—	November 18, 2006	Kitt Peak	Spacewatch	·	1.5 km	MPC · JPL
556639	2014 QO_{292}	—	August 25, 2014	Haleakala	Pan-STARRS 1	·	1.5 km	MPC · JPL
556640	2014 QQ_{292}	—	August 25, 2014	Haleakala	Pan-STARRS 1	·	1.8 km	MPC · JPL
556641	2014 QY_{292}	—	August 22, 2014	Haleakala	Pan-STARRS 1	·	1.6 km	MPC · JPL
556642	2014 QZ_{293}	—	May 9, 2013	Haleakala	Pan-STARRS 1	·	2.2 km	MPC · JPL
556643	2014 QE_{305}	—	August 29, 2006	Catalina	CSS	·	950 m	MPC · JPL
556644	2014 QN_{313}	—	November 22, 2005	Kitt Peak	Spacewatch	·	1.5 km	MPC · JPL
556645	2014 QT_{314}	—	November 13, 2007	Mount Lemmon	Mount Lemmon Survey	·	1.7 km	MPC · JPL
556646	2014 QS_{316}	—	March 19, 2013	Palomar	Palomar Transient Factory	·	1.1 km	MPC · JPL
556647	2014 QM_{318}	—	January 19, 2008	Mount Lemmon	Mount Lemmon Survey	·	1.3 km	MPC · JPL
556648	2014 QX_{320}	—	July 30, 2014	Haleakala	Pan-STARRS 1	·	1.3 km	MPC · JPL
556649	2014 QZ_{321}	—	September 30, 2005	Mount Lemmon	Mount Lemmon Survey	·	1.4 km	MPC · JPL
556650	2014 QT_{322}	—	October 6, 2005	Kitt Peak	Spacewatch	·	1.6 km	MPC · JPL
556651	2014 QO_{324}	—	November 16, 2010	Mount Lemmon	Mount Lemmon Survey	·	1.3 km	MPC · JPL
556652	2014 QJ_{326}	—	September 30, 2005	Kitt Peak	Spacewatch	GAL	1.2 km	MPC · JPL
556653	2014 QF_{327}	—	August 25, 2014	Haleakala	Pan-STARRS 1	MAR	660 m	MPC · JPL
556654	2014 QK_{327}	—	March 5, 2013	Catalina	CSS	H	400 m	MPC · JPL
556655	2014 QP_{327}	—	August 25, 2014	Haleakala	Pan-STARRS 1	·	1.4 km	MPC · JPL
556656	2014 QQ_{327}	—	August 30, 2005	Kitt Peak	Spacewatch	·	1.4 km	MPC · JPL
556657	2014 QU_{327}	—	July 28, 2003	Palomar	NEAT	PHO	940 m	MPC · JPL
556658	2014 QD_{328}	—	March 16, 2012	Haleakala	Pan-STARRS 1	HNS	980 m	MPC · JPL
556659	2014 QE_{331}	—	August 25, 2014	Haleakala	Pan-STARRS 1	·	1.1 km	MPC · JPL
556660	2014 QP_{332}	—	November 1, 2010	Mount Lemmon	Mount Lemmon Survey	·	1.5 km	MPC · JPL
556661	2014 QQ_{332}	—	March 16, 2012	Catalina	CSS	·	2.1 km	MPC · JPL
556662	2014 QC_{335}	—	October 2, 2010	Mount Lemmon	Mount Lemmon Survey	BRG	1.5 km	MPC · JPL
556663	2014 QQ_{337}	—	July 1, 2014	Haleakala	Pan-STARRS 1	MAR	890 m	MPC · JPL
556664	2014 QB_{338}	—	July 28, 2014	Haleakala	Pan-STARRS 1	·	3.5 km	MPC · JPL
556665	2014 QA_{340}	—	August 15, 2014	Haleakala	Pan-STARRS 1	·	950 m	MPC · JPL
556666	2014 QL_{340}	—	May 6, 2006	Kitt Peak	Spacewatch	NYS	890 m	MPC · JPL
556667	2014 QY_{341}	—	October 8, 2007	Mount Lemmon	Mount Lemmon Survey	·	730 m	MPC · JPL
556668	2014 QB_{343}	—	March 21, 2001	Kitt Peak	SKADS	·	950 m	MPC · JPL
556669	2014 QY_{343}	—	July 28, 2014	Haleakala	Pan-STARRS 1	NYS	1.1 km	MPC · JPL
556670	2014 QD_{344}	—	June 3, 2014	Haleakala	Pan-STARRS 1	·	1.1 km	MPC · JPL
556671	2014 QR_{344}	—	August 3, 2014	Haleakala	Pan-STARRS 1	·	790 m	MPC · JPL
556672	2014 QJ_{345}	—	December 29, 2011	Mount Lemmon	Mount Lemmon Survey	·	1.2 km	MPC · JPL
556673	2014 QK_{347}	—	August 26, 2014	Haleakala	Pan-STARRS 1	·	2.1 km	MPC · JPL
556674	2014 QM_{349}	—	August 30, 2005	Palomar	NEAT	·	2.3 km	MPC · JPL
556675	2014 QR_{350}	—	September 20, 2009	Mount Lemmon	Mount Lemmon Survey	KOR	1.1 km	MPC · JPL
556676	2014 QY_{350}	—	January 29, 2007	Kitt Peak	Spacewatch	·	1.6 km	MPC · JPL
556677	2014 QF_{352}	—	April 10, 2013	Haleakala	Pan-STARRS 1	(5)	1.2 km	MPC · JPL
556678	2014 QQ_{353}	—	September 29, 2005	Kitt Peak	Spacewatch	EUN	1.1 km	MPC · JPL
556679	2014 QK_{356}	—	February 28, 2008	Mount Lemmon	Mount Lemmon Survey	·	1.3 km	MPC · JPL
556680	2014 QY_{356}	—	August 27, 2014	Haleakala	Pan-STARRS 1	·	1.3 km	MPC · JPL
556681	2014 QE_{357}	—	September 18, 2010	Mount Lemmon	Mount Lemmon Survey	·	1.4 km	MPC · JPL
556682	2014 QR_{358}	—	March 14, 2012	Mount Lemmon	Mount Lemmon Survey	·	1.7 km	MPC · JPL
556683	2014 QD_{359}	—	August 27, 2014	Haleakala	Pan-STARRS 1	BRA	1.2 km	MPC · JPL
556684	2014 QL_{360}	—	August 27, 2014	Haleakala	Pan-STARRS 1	·	1.2 km	MPC · JPL
556685	2014 QZ_{361}	—	August 28, 2014	Kitt Peak	Spacewatch	·	970 m	MPC · JPL
556686	2014 QF_{362}	—	June 24, 2014	Haleakala	Pan-STARRS 1	H	570 m	MPC · JPL
556687	2014 QZ_{364}	—	July 31, 2014	Haleakala	Pan-STARRS 1	H	380 m	MPC · JPL
556688	2014 QH_{366}	—	August 25, 2014	Haleakala	Pan-STARRS 1	·	1.4 km	MPC · JPL
556689	2014 QG_{368}	—	March 14, 2012	Mount Lemmon	Mount Lemmon Survey	HNS	1.0 km	MPC · JPL
556690	2014 QH_{368}	—	January 29, 2011	Mount Lemmon	Mount Lemmon Survey	DOR	2.1 km	MPC · JPL
556691	2014 QJ_{368}	—	September 11, 2005	Kitt Peak	Spacewatch	ADE	1.7 km	MPC · JPL
556692	2014 QK_{368}	—	August 25, 2014	Haleakala	Pan-STARRS 1	·	1.3 km	MPC · JPL
556693	2014 QM_{368}	—	February 7, 2008	Kitt Peak	Spacewatch	·	1.5 km	MPC · JPL
556694	2014 QN_{369}	—	August 27, 2014	Haleakala	Pan-STARRS 1	·	710 m	MPC · JPL
556695	2014 QP_{372}	—	July 31, 2014	Haleakala	Pan-STARRS 1	H	490 m	MPC · JPL
556696	2014 QX_{379}	—	August 27, 2014	Haleakala	Pan-STARRS 1	H	300 m	MPC · JPL
556697	2014 QX_{380}	—	July 29, 2014	Haleakala	Pan-STARRS 1	H	410 m	MPC · JPL
556698	2014 QO_{381}	—	August 27, 2014	Haleakala	Pan-STARRS 1	MAR	640 m	MPC · JPL
556699	2014 QB_{382}	—	July 8, 2014	Haleakala	Pan-STARRS 1	·	1.1 km	MPC · JPL
556700	2014 QC_{382}	—	September 25, 2006	Kitt Peak	Spacewatch	·	860 m	MPC · JPL

== 556701–556800 ==
back to top

Designation			Discovery			Properties		Ref
Permanent	Provisional	Named after	Date	Site	Discoverer(s)	Category	Diam.	Ref
556701	2014 QR_{385}	—	December 25, 2010	Mount Lemmon	Mount Lemmon Survey	·	1.9 km	MPC · JPL
556702	2014 QH_{388}	—	July 25, 2014	Haleakala	Pan-STARRS 1	MAS	570 m	MPC · JPL
556703	2014 QR_{389}	—	April 10, 2013	Haleakala	Pan-STARRS 1	EUN	1.0 km	MPC · JPL
556704	2014 QE_{390}	—	October 10, 2004	Kitt Peak	Spacewatch	H	500 m	MPC · JPL
556705	2014 QR_{390}	—	August 31, 2014	Mount Lemmon	Mount Lemmon Survey	H	410 m	MPC · JPL
556706	2014 QV_{391}	—	June 24, 2011	Nogales	M. Schwartz, P. R. Holvorcem	H	700 m	MPC · JPL
556707	2014 QT_{397}	—	August 27, 2014	Haleakala	Pan-STARRS 1	·	1.2 km	MPC · JPL
556708	2014 QA_{403}	—	February 14, 2013	Kitt Peak	Spacewatch	·	1.0 km	MPC · JPL
556709	2014 QL_{403}	—	August 28, 2014	Haleakala	Pan-STARRS 1	·	1.7 km	MPC · JPL
556710	2014 QN_{404}	—	January 21, 2013	Haleakala	Pan-STARRS 1	·	1.3 km	MPC · JPL
556711	2014 QA_{405}	—	October 17, 2010	Mount Lemmon	Mount Lemmon Survey	MAR	1.1 km	MPC · JPL
556712	2014 QU_{405}	—	August 31, 2005	Kitt Peak	Spacewatch	·	2.3 km	MPC · JPL
556713	2014 QV_{406}	—	September 17, 2006	Kitt Peak	Spacewatch	·	1.3 km	MPC · JPL
556714	2014 QA_{407}	—	August 29, 2014	Kitt Peak	Spacewatch	EUN	860 m	MPC · JPL
556715	2014 QZ_{410}	—	May 4, 2009	Mount Lemmon	Mount Lemmon Survey	(5)	1.3 km	MPC · JPL
556716	2014 QH_{412}	—	June 26, 2014	Haleakala	Pan-STARRS 1	NYS	1.1 km	MPC · JPL
556717	2014 QT_{412}	—	July 30, 2014	Kitt Peak	Spacewatch	·	1.1 km	MPC · JPL
556718	2014 QK_{415}	—	September 5, 2010	Mount Lemmon	Mount Lemmon Survey	MAR	880 m	MPC · JPL
556719	2014 QZ_{415}	—	March 19, 2013	Haleakala	Pan-STARRS 1	PHO	750 m	MPC · JPL
556720	2014 QE_{419}	—	March 10, 2003	Kitt Peak	Spacewatch	·	1.8 km	MPC · JPL
556721	2014 QG_{423}	—	January 21, 2012	Kitt Peak	Spacewatch	(5)	1.2 km	MPC · JPL
556722	2014 QU_{423}	—	September 12, 2001	Kitt Peak	Deep Ecliptic Survey	HNS	1.1 km	MPC · JPL
556723	2014 QE_{425}	—	July 7, 2014	Haleakala	Pan-STARRS 1	·	750 m	MPC · JPL
556724	2014 QW_{428}	—	September 12, 2007	Mount Lemmon	Mount Lemmon Survey	·	880 m	MPC · JPL
556725	2014 QC_{431}	—	October 9, 2010	Mount Lemmon	Mount Lemmon Survey	·	1.1 km	MPC · JPL
556726	2014 QN_{432}	—	October 22, 2005	Kitt Peak	Spacewatch	·	2.0 km	MPC · JPL
556727	2014 QU_{437}	—	October 26, 2005	Kitt Peak	Spacewatch	·	2.0 km	MPC · JPL
556728	2014 QU_{438}	—	July 16, 2013	Haleakala	Pan-STARRS 1	·	2.1 km	MPC · JPL
556729	2014 QT_{440}	—	January 31, 2008	Mount Lemmon	Mount Lemmon Survey	·	1.7 km	MPC · JPL
556730	2014 QT_{441}	—	August 25, 2014	Haleakala	Pan-STARRS 1	·	1.7 km	MPC · JPL
556731	2014 QZ_{446}	—	August 28, 2014	Haleakala	Pan-STARRS 1	EUN	880 m	MPC · JPL
556732	2014 QQ_{447}	—	July 28, 2005	Palomar	NEAT	·	2.1 km	MPC · JPL
556733	2014 QK_{448}	—	January 2, 2012	Kitt Peak	Spacewatch	·	1.2 km	MPC · JPL
556734	2014 QN_{448}	—	November 8, 2010	Mount Lemmon	Mount Lemmon Survey	GEF	950 m	MPC · JPL
556735	2014 QO_{449}	—	October 31, 2006	Mount Lemmon	Mount Lemmon Survey	·	1.3 km	MPC · JPL
556736	2014 QA_{450}	—	November 18, 2006	Mount Lemmon	Mount Lemmon Survey	·	1.3 km	MPC · JPL
556737	2014 QC_{450}	—	December 12, 2006	Mount Lemmon	Mount Lemmon Survey	·	1.3 km	MPC · JPL
556738	2014 QJ_{450}	—	August 30, 2014	Haleakala	Pan-STARRS 1	·	1.8 km	MPC · JPL
556739	2014 QK_{450}	—	October 23, 2006	Mount Lemmon	Mount Lemmon Survey	·	1.1 km	MPC · JPL
556740	2014 QL_{450}	—	March 13, 2007	Mount Lemmon	Mount Lemmon Survey	·	1.9 km	MPC · JPL
556741	2014 QK_{452}	—	August 28, 2014	Haleakala	Pan-STARRS 1	·	1.0 km	MPC · JPL
556742	2014 QN_{452}	—	August 31, 2014	Haleakala	Pan-STARRS 1	·	1.3 km	MPC · JPL
556743	2014 QX_{452}	—	August 30, 2009	La Sagra	OAM	·	1.7 km	MPC · JPL
556744	2014 QA_{454}	—	April 22, 2009	Mount Lemmon	Mount Lemmon Survey	·	710 m	MPC · JPL
556745	2014 QG_{455}	—	November 3, 2010	Mount Lemmon	Mount Lemmon Survey	·	1.3 km	MPC · JPL
556746	2014 QJ_{457}	—	November 11, 2001	Apache Point	SDSS	·	1.6 km	MPC · JPL
556747	2014 QR_{458}	—	May 15, 2013	Haleakala	Pan-STARRS 1	MAR	980 m	MPC · JPL
556748	2014 QC_{460}	—	March 4, 2012	Mount Lemmon	Mount Lemmon Survey	·	1.4 km	MPC · JPL
556749	2014 QY_{460}	—	March 13, 2012	Mount Lemmon	Mount Lemmon Survey	·	1.4 km	MPC · JPL
556750	2014 QA_{463}	—	October 12, 2010	Mount Lemmon	Mount Lemmon Survey	·	1.3 km	MPC · JPL
556751	2014 QB_{463}	—	October 9, 2010	Mount Lemmon	Mount Lemmon Survey	·	1.2 km	MPC · JPL
556752	2014 QS_{463}	—	October 3, 2006	Mount Lemmon	Mount Lemmon Survey	·	1.7 km	MPC · JPL
556753	2014 QF_{465}	—	November 14, 2010	Catalina	CSS	EUN	840 m	MPC · JPL
556754	2014 QG_{465}	—	August 23, 2014	Haleakala	Pan-STARRS 1	·	1.9 km	MPC · JPL
556755	2014 QJ_{466}	—	March 9, 2011	Mount Lemmon	Mount Lemmon Survey	·	2.6 km	MPC · JPL
556756	2014 QN_{466}	—	August 28, 2005	Kitt Peak	Spacewatch	·	1.6 km	MPC · JPL
556757	2014 QS_{466}	—	August 25, 2014	Haleakala	Pan-STARRS 1	·	1.2 km	MPC · JPL
556758	2014 QX_{466}	—	August 25, 2014	Haleakala	Pan-STARRS 1	·	1.4 km	MPC · JPL
556759	2014 QP_{467}	—	August 27, 2014	Haleakala	Pan-STARRS 1	·	1.3 km	MPC · JPL
556760	2014 QU_{468}	—	October 9, 2010	Kitt Peak	Spacewatch	·	1.0 km	MPC · JPL
556761	2014 QL_{469}	—	October 12, 2010	Mount Lemmon	Mount Lemmon Survey	·	1.5 km	MPC · JPL
556762	2014 QY_{469}	—	November 11, 2001	Apache Point	SDSS Collaboration	·	1.6 km	MPC · JPL
556763	2014 QN_{470}	—	July 28, 2014	Haleakala	Pan-STARRS 1	MAR	670 m	MPC · JPL
556764	2014 QK_{471}	—	August 29, 2014	Haleakala	Pan-STARRS 1	·	2.0 km	MPC · JPL
556765	2014 QU_{471}	—	August 30, 2014	Haleakala	Pan-STARRS 1	·	1.5 km	MPC · JPL
556766	2014 QO_{473}	—	August 31, 2014	Haleakala	Pan-STARRS 1	·	1.1 km	MPC · JPL
556767	2014 QG_{474}	—	May 19, 2013	Nogales	M. Schwartz, P. R. Holvorcem	·	1.6 km	MPC · JPL
556768	2014 QN_{474}	—	August 31, 2014	Haleakala	Pan-STARRS 1	·	1.8 km	MPC · JPL
556769	2014 QT_{474}	—	February 2, 2006	Mount Lemmon	Mount Lemmon Survey	·	980 m	MPC · JPL
556770	2014 QG_{475}	—	January 10, 2008	Kitt Peak	Spacewatch	HNS	940 m	MPC · JPL
556771	2014 QL_{475}	—	July 1, 2014	Haleakala	Pan-STARRS 1	·	990 m	MPC · JPL
556772	2014 QX_{475}	—	May 31, 2014	Haleakala	Pan-STARRS 1	·	1.2 km	MPC · JPL
556773	2014 QY_{476}	—	November 28, 2010	Mount Lemmon	Mount Lemmon Survey	·	1.5 km	MPC · JPL
556774	2014 QE_{478}	—	March 23, 2003	Kitt Peak	Spacewatch	·	1.7 km	MPC · JPL
556775	2014 QG_{478}	—	September 10, 2007	Mount Lemmon	Mount Lemmon Survey	·	680 m	MPC · JPL
556776	2014 QH_{480}	—	March 18, 2004	Kitt Peak	Spacewatch	·	1.3 km	MPC · JPL
556777	2014 QZ_{482}	—	October 23, 2006	Mount Lemmon	Mount Lemmon Survey	·	1.3 km	MPC · JPL
556778	2014 QN_{483}	—	September 17, 2006	Kitt Peak	Spacewatch	·	860 m	MPC · JPL
556779	2014 QA_{484}	—	September 19, 1998	Apache Point	SDSS Collaboration	·	850 m	MPC · JPL
556780	2014 QO_{484}	—	February 9, 2008	Kitt Peak	Spacewatch	·	980 m	MPC · JPL
556781	2014 QJ_{487}	—	March 25, 2006	Kitt Peak	Spacewatch	·	940 m	MPC · JPL
556782	2014 QF_{488}	—	September 19, 2006	Kitt Peak	Spacewatch	·	1.6 km	MPC · JPL
556783	2014 QD_{490}	—	August 22, 2014	Haleakala	Pan-STARRS 1	EOS	1.4 km	MPC · JPL
556784	2014 QH_{490}	—	March 18, 2004	Kitt Peak	Spacewatch	·	1.7 km	MPC · JPL
556785	2014 QD_{493}	—	September 11, 2005	Kitt Peak	Spacewatch	·	1.7 km	MPC · JPL
556786	2014 QZ_{493}	—	October 26, 2009	Kitt Peak	Spacewatch	·	1.4 km	MPC · JPL
556787	2014 QR_{495}	—	August 28, 2014	Haleakala	Pan-STARRS 1	·	1.5 km	MPC · JPL
556788	2014 QB_{496}	—	August 23, 2014	Haleakala	Pan-STARRS 1	·	1.4 km	MPC · JPL
556789	2014 QE_{496}	—	August 20, 2014	Haleakala	Pan-STARRS 1	·	950 m	MPC · JPL
556790	2014 QL_{496}	—	July 31, 2005	Palomar	NEAT	·	1.1 km	MPC · JPL
556791	2014 QP_{496}	—	August 31, 2014	Haleakala	Pan-STARRS 1	PAD	1.3 km	MPC · JPL
556792	2014 QA_{501}	—	August 31, 2014	Haleakala	Pan-STARRS 1	H	360 m	MPC · JPL
556793	2014 QQ_{505}	—	August 29, 2014	Mount Lemmon	Mount Lemmon Survey	·	1.1 km	MPC · JPL
556794	2014 QS_{506}	—	August 28, 2014	Haleakala	Pan-STARRS 1	·	1.0 km	MPC · JPL
556795	2014 QP_{516}	—	August 22, 2014	Haleakala	Pan-STARRS 1	·	1.0 km	MPC · JPL
556796	2014 QW_{518}	—	August 23, 2014	Haleakala	Pan-STARRS 1	MAR	860 m	MPC · JPL
556797	2014 QX_{518}	—	August 28, 2014	Haleakala	Pan-STARRS 1	·	1.2 km	MPC · JPL
556798	2014 QG_{519}	—	January 14, 2011	Mount Lemmon	Mount Lemmon Survey	·	1.4 km	MPC · JPL
556799	2014 QW_{521}	—	August 19, 2014	Haleakala	Pan-STARRS 1	·	1.2 km	MPC · JPL
556800	2014 QC_{522}	—	February 12, 2008	Mount Lemmon	Mount Lemmon Survey	·	1.2 km	MPC · JPL

== 556801–556900 ==
back to top

Designation			Discovery			Properties		Ref
Permanent	Provisional	Named after	Date	Site	Discoverer(s)	Category	Diam.	Ref
556801	2014 QQ_{522}	—	August 22, 2014	Haleakala	Pan-STARRS 1	·	1.5 km	MPC · JPL
556802	2014 QD_{527}	—	August 23, 2014	Haleakala	Pan-STARRS 1	·	1.3 km	MPC · JPL
556803	2014 QK_{536}	—	August 25, 2014	Haleakala	Pan-STARRS 1	·	2.4 km	MPC · JPL
556804	2014 QS_{538}	—	August 28, 2014	Haleakala	Pan-STARRS 1	·	2.4 km	MPC · JPL
556805	2014 QW_{538}	—	August 28, 2014	Haleakala	Pan-STARRS 1	·	1.8 km	MPC · JPL
556806	2014 QH_{540}	—	August 28, 2014	Haleakala	Pan-STARRS 1	EOS	1.6 km	MPC · JPL
556807	2014 RN_{5}	—	September 14, 2010	Mount Lemmon	Mount Lemmon Survey	·	970 m	MPC · JPL
556808	2014 RL_{6}	—	September 11, 2005	Kitt Peak	Spacewatch	·	1.9 km	MPC · JPL
556809	2014 RZ_{6}	—	July 29, 2014	Haleakala	Pan-STARRS 1	·	1.8 km	MPC · JPL
556810	2014 RX_{7}	—	March 14, 2004	Kitt Peak	Spacewatch	·	1.6 km	MPC · JPL
556811	2014 RR_{11}	—	February 2, 2000	Kitt Peak	Spacewatch	H	530 m	MPC · JPL
556812	2014 RW_{12}	—	June 2, 2013	Nogales	M. Schwartz, P. R. Holvorcem	·	3.3 km	MPC · JPL
556813	2014 RN_{17}	—	August 20, 2006	Palomar	NEAT	H	450 m	MPC · JPL
556814	2014 RR_{17}	—	September 11, 2014	Haleakala	Pan-STARRS 1	H	560 m	MPC · JPL
556815	2014 RS_{19}	—	October 29, 2010	Catalina	CSS	EUN	1.1 km	MPC · JPL
556816	2014 RH_{24}	—	September 17, 2006	Kitt Peak	Spacewatch	·	1.2 km	MPC · JPL
556817	2014 RV_{26}	—	September 6, 2010	Mount Lemmon	Mount Lemmon Survey	·	1.0 km	MPC · JPL
556818	2014 RT_{28}	—	March 15, 2013	Kitt Peak	Spacewatch	·	1.1 km	MPC · JPL
556819	2014 RG_{30}	—	September 18, 1995	Kitt Peak	Spacewatch	NYS	880 m	MPC · JPL
556820	2014 RR_{30}	—	April 3, 2011	Haleakala	Pan-STARRS 1	H	350 m	MPC · JPL
556821	2014 RA_{31}	—	March 6, 2008	Mount Lemmon	Mount Lemmon Survey	HNS	990 m	MPC · JPL
556822	2014 RG_{32}	—	August 4, 2014	Haleakala	Pan-STARRS 1	·	930 m	MPC · JPL
556823	2014 RX_{34}	—	February 2, 2008	Mount Lemmon	Mount Lemmon Survey	HNS	1.2 km	MPC · JPL
556824	2014 RR_{39}	—	September 18, 2010	Kitt Peak	Spacewatch	MAR	750 m	MPC · JPL
556825	2014 RN_{40}	—	February 3, 2002	Palomar	NEAT	·	2.2 km	MPC · JPL
556826	2014 RM_{41}	—	August 26, 2014	ESA OGS	ESA OGS	·	1.3 km	MPC · JPL
556827	2014 RC_{42}	—	October 29, 2010	Catalina	CSS	·	1.3 km	MPC · JPL
556828	2014 RJ_{43}	—	October 29, 2003	Socorro	LINEAR	·	2.3 km	MPC · JPL
556829	2014 RE_{44}	—	June 13, 2010	Mount Lemmon	Mount Lemmon Survey	·	1.2 km	MPC · JPL
556830	2014 RM_{44}	—	September 14, 2014	Kitt Peak	Spacewatch	·	1.1 km	MPC · JPL
556831	2014 RK_{49}	—	March 9, 2000	Kitt Peak	Spacewatch	·	1.4 km	MPC · JPL
556832	2014 RK_{52}	—	February 10, 2008	Mount Lemmon	Mount Lemmon Survey	·	1.4 km	MPC · JPL
556833	2014 RH_{53}	—	August 27, 2006	Kitt Peak	Spacewatch	·	890 m	MPC · JPL
556834	2014 RO_{56}	—	March 28, 2012	Mount Lemmon	Mount Lemmon Survey	·	1.5 km	MPC · JPL
556835	2014 RE_{59}	—	April 1, 2008	Kitt Peak	Spacewatch	AST	1.6 km	MPC · JPL
556836	2014 RW_{60}	—	January 11, 2003	Kitt Peak	Spacewatch	EUN	1.4 km	MPC · JPL
556837	2014 RH_{62}	—	November 6, 2010	Catalina	CSS	·	2.3 km	MPC · JPL
556838	2014 RD_{64}	—	September 2, 2014	Haleakala	Pan-STARRS 1	H	470 m	MPC · JPL
556839	2014 RS_{64}	—	August 16, 2009	La Sagra	OAM	·	1.8 km	MPC · JPL
556840	2014 RT_{64}	—	August 31, 2014	Catalina	CSS	·	1.4 km	MPC · JPL
556841	2014 RT_{65}	—	April 9, 2008	Mount Lemmon	Mount Lemmon Survey	·	1.4 km	MPC · JPL
556842	2014 RV_{67}	—	September 2, 2014	Haleakala	Pan-STARRS 1	·	1.6 km	MPC · JPL
556843	2014 RY_{67}	—	September 2, 2014	Haleakala	Pan-STARRS 1	·	1.2 km	MPC · JPL
556844	2014 RM_{68}	—	December 27, 2011	Mount Lemmon	Mount Lemmon Survey	·	1.6 km	MPC · JPL
556845	2014 RO_{68}	—	July 13, 2009	Kitt Peak	Spacewatch	·	1.3 km	MPC · JPL
556846	2014 RC_{69}	—	December 21, 2005	Kitt Peak	Spacewatch	·	2.1 km	MPC · JPL
556847	2014 RB_{70}	—	September 14, 2014	Kitt Peak	Spacewatch	·	1.7 km	MPC · JPL
556848	2014 RK_{70}	—	September 4, 2014	Haleakala	Pan-STARRS 1	·	1.2 km	MPC · JPL
556849	2014 RM_{70}	—	February 11, 2016	Haleakala	Pan-STARRS 1	·	1.5 km	MPC · JPL
556850	2014 RS_{70}	—	September 2, 2014	Haleakala	Pan-STARRS 1	·	920 m	MPC · JPL
556851	2014 RW_{76}	—	September 4, 2014	Haleakala	Pan-STARRS 1	·	1.1 km	MPC · JPL
556852	2014 RT_{80}	—	September 4, 2014	Haleakala	Pan-STARRS 1	EOS	1.5 km	MPC · JPL
556853	2014 RA_{81}	—	September 2, 2014	Haleakala	Pan-STARRS 1	·	1.7 km	MPC · JPL
556854	2014 SG	—	July 30, 2014	Haleakala	Pan-STARRS 1	H	370 m	MPC · JPL
556855	2014 SF_{5}	—	September 28, 2003	Anderson Mesa	LONEOS	·	2.5 km	MPC · JPL
556856	2014 SK_{5}	—	March 31, 2008	Kitt Peak	Spacewatch	·	1.5 km	MPC · JPL
556857	2014 SC_{7}	—	August 20, 2014	Haleakala	Pan-STARRS 1	·	840 m	MPC · JPL
556858	2014 SV_{7}	—	November 13, 2006	Catalina	CSS	BRG	1.3 km	MPC · JPL
556859	2014 SG_{11}	—	October 17, 2010	Mount Lemmon	Mount Lemmon Survey	·	1.2 km	MPC · JPL
556860	2014 SC_{13}	—	April 10, 2013	Mount Lemmon	Mount Lemmon Survey	·	1.0 km	MPC · JPL
556861	2014 SE_{13}	—	August 19, 2014	Haleakala	Pan-STARRS 1	·	1.3 km	MPC · JPL
556862	2014 SP_{14}	—	August 20, 2014	Haleakala	Pan-STARRS 1	·	1.1 km	MPC · JPL
556863	2014 SW_{14}	—	November 20, 2006	Kitt Peak	Spacewatch	·	1.2 km	MPC · JPL
556864	2014 SO_{16}	—	March 9, 2007	Kitt Peak	Spacewatch	·	1.8 km	MPC · JPL
556865	2014 ST_{18}	—	September 26, 2006	Mount Lemmon	Mount Lemmon Survey	·	950 m	MPC · JPL
556866	2014 SY_{18}	—	October 12, 2010	Mount Lemmon	Mount Lemmon Survey	·	1.2 km	MPC · JPL
556867	2014 SZ_{21}	—	April 12, 2013	Haleakala	Pan-STARRS 1	·	1.0 km	MPC · JPL
556868	2014 SR_{23}	—	April 30, 2013	Kitt Peak	Spacewatch	·	1.3 km	MPC · JPL
556869	2014 SZ_{26}	—	August 20, 2014	Haleakala	Pan-STARRS 1	KON	1.4 km	MPC · JPL
556870	2014 SP_{29}	—	January 10, 2007	Mount Lemmon	Mount Lemmon Survey	·	1.5 km	MPC · JPL
556871	2014 SG_{37}	—	February 28, 2012	Haleakala	Pan-STARRS 1	·	1.2 km	MPC · JPL
556872	2014 SY_{37}	—	June 26, 2014	Haleakala	Pan-STARRS 1	·	1 km	MPC · JPL
556873	2014 SU_{43}	—	July 7, 2014	Haleakala	Pan-STARRS 1	·	850 m	MPC · JPL
556874	2014 SM_{45}	—	January 27, 2012	Kitt Peak	Spacewatch	·	1.7 km	MPC · JPL
556875	2014 SE_{48}	—	February 12, 2008	Mount Lemmon	Mount Lemmon Survey	·	1.9 km	MPC · JPL
556876	2014 SZ_{48}	—	August 28, 2014	Haleakala	Pan-STARRS 1	·	1.4 km	MPC · JPL
556877	2014 ST_{55}	—	November 12, 2010	Mount Lemmon	Mount Lemmon Survey	·	1.4 km	MPC · JPL
556878	2014 SB_{56}	—	September 17, 2014	Haleakala	Pan-STARRS 1	·	1.4 km	MPC · JPL
556879	2014 SE_{56}	—	August 27, 2014	Haleakala	Pan-STARRS 1	·	900 m	MPC · JPL
556880	2014 SB_{58}	—	July 31, 2014	Haleakala	Pan-STARRS 1	·	1.3 km	MPC · JPL
556881	2014 SN_{58}	—	April 6, 2013	Mount Lemmon	Mount Lemmon Survey	·	1.0 km	MPC · JPL
556882	2014 SE_{60}	—	July 7, 2014	Haleakala	Pan-STARRS 1	·	1.2 km	MPC · JPL
556883	2014 ST_{61}	—	May 29, 2009	Mount Lemmon	Mount Lemmon Survey	·	990 m	MPC · JPL
556884	2014 SD_{63}	—	July 28, 2014	Haleakala	Pan-STARRS 1	·	1.1 km	MPC · JPL
556885	2014 SK_{64}	—	January 28, 2004	Kitt Peak	Spacewatch	·	1.1 km	MPC · JPL
556886	2014 SG_{67}	—	March 23, 2013	Mount Lemmon	Mount Lemmon Survey	·	960 m	MPC · JPL
556887	2014 SC_{69}	—	July 25, 2014	Haleakala	Pan-STARRS 1	·	1.4 km	MPC · JPL
556888	2014 SU_{69}	—	August 28, 2014	Haleakala	Pan-STARRS 1	·	1.1 km	MPC · JPL
556889	2014 SX_{72}	—	April 17, 2013	Haleakala	Pan-STARRS 1	MRX	960 m	MPC · JPL
556890	2014 SL_{73}	—	November 18, 2006	Kitt Peak	Spacewatch	·	1.8 km	MPC · JPL
556891	2014 SL_{74}	—	August 28, 2014	Haleakala	Pan-STARRS 1	·	1.3 km	MPC · JPL
556892	2014 SA_{76}	—	January 2, 2012	Mount Lemmon	Mount Lemmon Survey	·	1.2 km	MPC · JPL
556893	2014 ST_{77}	—	July 25, 2014	Haleakala	Pan-STARRS 1	TIR	2.0 km	MPC · JPL
556894	2014 SE_{79}	—	January 17, 2011	Mount Lemmon	Mount Lemmon Survey	·	1.9 km	MPC · JPL
556895	2014 ST_{79}	—	January 27, 2012	Kitt Peak	Spacewatch	BRG	1.2 km	MPC · JPL
556896	2014 SP_{80}	—	September 27, 2009	Mount Lemmon	Mount Lemmon Survey	·	1.5 km	MPC · JPL
556897	2014 SY_{80}	—	October 23, 2011	Haleakala	Pan-STARRS 1	·	1.2 km	MPC · JPL
556898	2014 SP_{81}	—	March 2, 2009	Mount Lemmon	Mount Lemmon Survey	·	1.4 km	MPC · JPL
556899	2014 SY_{86}	—	August 27, 2014	Haleakala	Pan-STARRS 1	·	1.2 km	MPC · JPL
556900	2014 SH_{87}	—	September 1, 2005	Kitt Peak	Spacewatch	·	1.6 km	MPC · JPL

== 556901–557000 ==
back to top

Designation			Discovery			Properties		Ref
Permanent	Provisional	Named after	Date	Site	Discoverer(s)	Category	Diam.	Ref
556901	2014 SM_{87}	—	October 3, 2010	Kitt Peak	Spacewatch	·	1.0 km	MPC · JPL
556902	2014 SY_{93}	—	September 14, 2006	Kitt Peak	Spacewatch	·	790 m	MPC · JPL
556903	2014 SE_{98}	—	March 2, 2008	Kitt Peak	Spacewatch	MAR	880 m	MPC · JPL
556904	2014 SH_{98}	—	August 27, 2014	Haleakala	Pan-STARRS 1	MAR	930 m	MPC · JPL
556905	2014 SM_{99}	—	January 15, 2008	Kitt Peak	Spacewatch	·	960 m	MPC · JPL
556906	2014 SO_{100}	—	August 27, 2014	Haleakala	Pan-STARRS 1	ADE	1.6 km	MPC · JPL
556907	2014 SO_{104}	—	January 19, 2012	Haleakala	Pan-STARRS 1	·	900 m	MPC · JPL
556908	2014 SA_{107}	—	September 18, 2014	Haleakala	Pan-STARRS 1	·	800 m	MPC · JPL
556909	2014 SZ_{107}	—	September 18, 2014	Haleakala	Pan-STARRS 1	·	1.3 km	MPC · JPL
556910	2014 SP_{109}	—	March 25, 2003	Kitt Peak	Spacewatch	·	1.1 km	MPC · JPL
556911	2014 SE_{111}	—	June 4, 2013	Mount Lemmon	Mount Lemmon Survey	·	1.1 km	MPC · JPL
556912	2014 SE_{113}	—	September 15, 2009	Kitt Peak	Spacewatch	·	1.2 km	MPC · JPL
556913	2014 SY_{113}	—	November 13, 2010	Mount Lemmon	Mount Lemmon Survey	·	1.4 km	MPC · JPL
556914	2014 SA_{117}	—	November 6, 2010	Mount Lemmon	Mount Lemmon Survey	·	1.2 km	MPC · JPL
556915	2014 SE_{117}	—	April 1, 2008	Kitt Peak	Spacewatch	·	1.6 km	MPC · JPL
556916	2014 SL_{117}	—	December 16, 2006	Mount Lemmon	Mount Lemmon Survey	·	1.2 km	MPC · JPL
556917	2014 SW_{118}	—	February 1, 2008	Kitt Peak	Spacewatch	·	1.2 km	MPC · JPL
556918	2014 SD_{119}	—	August 30, 2005	Kitt Peak	Spacewatch	·	1.5 km	MPC · JPL
556919	2014 SY_{121}	—	January 31, 2009	Kitt Peak	Spacewatch	·	980 m	MPC · JPL
556920	2014 SP_{122}	—	October 8, 2010	Kitt Peak	Spacewatch	·	1.1 km	MPC · JPL
556921	2014 SZ_{131}	—	November 6, 2010	Mount Lemmon	Mount Lemmon Survey	·	1.3 km	MPC · JPL
556922	2014 SS_{133}	—	April 12, 2005	Kitt Peak	Deep Ecliptic Survey	EUN	740 m	MPC · JPL
556923	2014 SM_{134}	—	April 19, 2013	Haleakala	Pan-STARRS 1	EUN	1.1 km	MPC · JPL
556924	2014 SR_{134}	—	December 26, 2006	Kitt Peak	Spacewatch	·	1.5 km	MPC · JPL
556925	2014 SX_{136}	—	October 9, 2010	Mount Lemmon	Mount Lemmon Survey	·	1.0 km	MPC · JPL
556926	2014 SM_{137}	—	May 28, 2009	Mount Lemmon	Mount Lemmon Survey	·	930 m	MPC · JPL
556927	2014 SN_{140}	—	July 30, 2014	Haleakala	Pan-STARRS 1	·	900 m	MPC · JPL
556928	2014 SM_{141}	—	October 20, 2006	Mount Lemmon	Mount Lemmon Survey	(5)	1.0 km	MPC · JPL
556929	2014 SC_{142}	—	March 13, 2010	Mount Lemmon	Mount Lemmon Survey	H	490 m	MPC · JPL
556930	2014 SL_{143}	—	December 13, 2012	Mount Lemmon	Mount Lemmon Survey	H	450 m	MPC · JPL
556931	2014 SB_{144}	—	April 14, 2011	Mount Lemmon	Mount Lemmon Survey	H	500 m	MPC · JPL
556932	2014 ST_{145}	—	January 4, 2012	Mount Lemmon	Mount Lemmon Survey	·	1.0 km	MPC · JPL
556933	2014 SF_{148}	—	April 27, 2012	Haleakala	Pan-STARRS 1	·	2.1 km	MPC · JPL
556934	2014 SH_{148}	—	March 6, 2008	Catalina	CSS	H	450 m	MPC · JPL
556935	2014 SQ_{149}	—	July 7, 2014	Haleakala	Pan-STARRS 1	NYS	1.1 km	MPC · JPL
556936	2014 SB_{151}	—	April 29, 2000	Socorro	LINEAR	·	1.5 km	MPC · JPL
556937	2014 SS_{152}	—	September 28, 2001	Palomar	NEAT	·	1.7 km	MPC · JPL
556938	2014 SU_{152}	—	May 26, 2006	Mount Lemmon	Mount Lemmon Survey	NYS	1 km	MPC · JPL
556939	2014 SX_{152}	—	September 27, 2006	Kitt Peak	Spacewatch	H	440 m	MPC · JPL
556940	2014 SG_{153}	—	April 14, 2012	Haleakala	Pan-STARRS 1	·	1.7 km	MPC · JPL
556941	2014 SD_{154}	—	November 10, 2010	Kitt Peak	Spacewatch	·	1.7 km	MPC · JPL
556942	2014 SN_{154}	—	September 26, 2005	Kitt Peak	Spacewatch	·	1.3 km	MPC · JPL
556943	2014 SB_{155}	—	October 17, 2010	Mount Lemmon	Mount Lemmon Survey	·	1.1 km	MPC · JPL
556944	2014 SD_{157}	—	November 1, 2010	Mount Lemmon	Mount Lemmon Survey	·	940 m	MPC · JPL
556945	2014 SD_{158}	—	October 4, 2000	Kitt Peak	Spacewatch	·	530 m	MPC · JPL
556946	2014 SE_{158}	—	September 14, 2014	Kitt Peak	Spacewatch	·	1.9 km	MPC · JPL
556947	2014 SQ_{159}	—	October 6, 2005	Mount Lemmon	Mount Lemmon Survey	·	1.3 km	MPC · JPL
556948	2014 SU_{159}	—	November 19, 2006	Kitt Peak	Spacewatch	·	1.1 km	MPC · JPL
556949	2014 SU_{160}	—	November 13, 2010	Kitt Peak	Spacewatch	·	1.1 km	MPC · JPL
556950	2014 SC_{161}	—	November 13, 2010	Mount Lemmon	Mount Lemmon Survey	·	1.3 km	MPC · JPL
556951	2014 SK_{161}	—	November 7, 2010	Mount Lemmon	Mount Lemmon Survey	·	1.4 km	MPC · JPL
556952	2014 SQ_{162}	—	October 28, 2010	Mount Lemmon	Mount Lemmon Survey	·	1.3 km	MPC · JPL
556953	2014 ST_{166}	—	September 19, 2014	Haleakala	Pan-STARRS 1	·	1.5 km	MPC · JPL
556954	2014 SW_{168}	—	September 2, 2014	Catalina	CSS	·	1.1 km	MPC · JPL
556955	2014 SB_{179}	—	July 30, 2014	Haleakala	Pan-STARRS 1	MAS	630 m	MPC · JPL
556956	2014 SN_{179}	—	September 21, 2010	Bergisch Gladbach	W. Bickel	·	1.5 km	MPC · JPL
556957	2014 SY_{182}	—	December 18, 2007	Mount Lemmon	Mount Lemmon Survey	·	1.4 km	MPC · JPL
556958	2014 SZ_{183}	—	April 16, 2013	Haleakala	Pan-STARRS 1	·	1.1 km	MPC · JPL
556959	2014 SD_{185}	—	November 23, 2006	Kitt Peak	Spacewatch	·	1.4 km	MPC · JPL
556960	2014 SF_{185}	—	October 29, 2010	Kitt Peak	Spacewatch	·	1.4 km	MPC · JPL
556961	2014 SB_{187}	—	November 3, 2010	Mount Lemmon	Mount Lemmon Survey	·	1.4 km	MPC · JPL
556962	2014 SQ_{187}	—	March 22, 2012	Mount Lemmon	Mount Lemmon Survey	·	1.9 km	MPC · JPL
556963	2014 SR_{187}	—	October 17, 2010	Mount Lemmon	Mount Lemmon Survey	·	1.5 km	MPC · JPL
556964	2014 SK_{188}	—	August 27, 2014	Haleakala	Pan-STARRS 1	·	1.4 km	MPC · JPL
556965	2014 SM_{190}	—	August 27, 2014	Haleakala	Pan-STARRS 1	·	1.2 km	MPC · JPL
556966	2014 SO_{198}	—	March 28, 2012	Mount Lemmon	Mount Lemmon Survey	·	1.9 km	MPC · JPL
556967	2014 SP_{198}	—	November 8, 2010	Mount Lemmon	Mount Lemmon Survey	·	1.2 km	MPC · JPL
556968	2014 SO_{200}	—	December 29, 2011	Kitt Peak	Spacewatch	·	1.0 km	MPC · JPL
556969	2014 SO_{201}	—	February 1, 2008	Kitt Peak	Spacewatch	·	1.6 km	MPC · JPL
556970	2014 SB_{202}	—	October 23, 2006	Mount Lemmon	Mount Lemmon Survey	·	1.3 km	MPC · JPL
556971	2014 SO_{208}	—	August 31, 2014	Haleakala	Pan-STARRS 1	·	1.4 km	MPC · JPL
556972	2014 SB_{210}	—	February 5, 2011	Haleakala	Pan-STARRS 1	DOR	1.7 km	MPC · JPL
556973	2014 SH_{210}	—	September 4, 2014	Haleakala	Pan-STARRS 1	·	2.0 km	MPC · JPL
556974	2014 SA_{211}	—	December 14, 2010	Mount Lemmon	Mount Lemmon Survey	·	1.4 km	MPC · JPL
556975	2014 SN_{214}	—	January 19, 2005	Kitt Peak	Spacewatch	HYG	2.7 km	MPC · JPL
556976	2014 SG_{215}	—	December 14, 2010	Mount Lemmon	Mount Lemmon Survey	·	1.4 km	MPC · JPL
556977	2014 SQ_{216}	—	January 10, 2006	Kitt Peak	Spacewatch	·	1.7 km	MPC · JPL
556978	2014 SJ_{218}	—	January 14, 2011	Mount Lemmon	Mount Lemmon Survey	·	1.7 km	MPC · JPL
556979	2014 SX_{219}	—	September 20, 2014	Haleakala	Pan-STARRS 1	·	1.4 km	MPC · JPL
556980	2014 SC_{220}	—	September 20, 2014	Haleakala	Pan-STARRS 1	HNS	770 m	MPC · JPL
556981	2014 SQ_{220}	—	September 20, 2014	Haleakala	Pan-STARRS 1	·	1.7 km	MPC · JPL
556982	2014 SV_{221}	—	May 28, 2014	Haleakala	Pan-STARRS 1	HNS	1.5 km	MPC · JPL
556983	2014 SW_{221}	—	October 14, 2010	Mount Lemmon	Mount Lemmon Survey	·	1.9 km	MPC · JPL
556984	2014 SA_{222}	—	August 28, 2014	Haleakala	Pan-STARRS 1	·	2.0 km	MPC · JPL
556985	2014 SK_{223}	—	March 28, 2012	Kitt Peak	Spacewatch	·	2.0 km	MPC · JPL
556986	2014 SC_{226}	—	November 1, 2005	Kitt Peak	Spacewatch	DOR	1.9 km	MPC · JPL
556987	2014 ST_{230}	—	September 7, 2014	Haleakala	Pan-STARRS 1	·	1.9 km	MPC · JPL
556988	2014 SK_{231}	—	January 27, 2007	Mount Lemmon	Mount Lemmon Survey	·	2.1 km	MPC · JPL
556989	2014 SQ_{232}	—	September 19, 2014	Haleakala	Pan-STARRS 1	·	960 m	MPC · JPL
556990	2014 SZ_{232}	—	March 27, 2008	Mount Lemmon	Mount Lemmon Survey	·	1.3 km	MPC · JPL
556991	2014 SM_{234}	—	October 15, 2001	Apache Point	SDSS	EUN	1.6 km	MPC · JPL
556992	2014 SX_{235}	—	March 10, 2008	Kitt Peak	Spacewatch	·	1.2 km	MPC · JPL
556993	2014 SV_{238}	—	June 22, 2014	Mount Lemmon	Mount Lemmon Survey	·	1.4 km	MPC · JPL
556994	2014 ST_{239}	—	November 18, 2007	Mount Lemmon	Mount Lemmon Survey	·	1.2 km	MPC · JPL
556995	2014 SJ_{240}	—	August 27, 2014	Haleakala	Pan-STARRS 1	·	990 m	MPC · JPL
556996	2014 SL_{240}	—	May 30, 2013	Kitt Peak	Spacewatch	·	1.2 km	MPC · JPL
556997	2014 SB_{241}	—	January 16, 2003	Palomar	NEAT	·	1.4 km	MPC · JPL
556998	2014 SF_{246}	—	December 28, 2011	Mount Lemmon	Mount Lemmon Survey	·	2.1 km	MPC · JPL
556999	2014 SR_{246}	—	September 22, 2014	Haleakala	Pan-STARRS 1	·	1.8 km	MPC · JPL
557000	2014 SV_{247}	—	October 12, 2010	Mount Lemmon	Mount Lemmon Survey	·	2.2 km	MPC · JPL

back to top

== See also ==
- Meanings of minor-planet names: 556001–557000
