= Kuiper belt =

Area of the Solar System beyond the planets, comprising small bodies

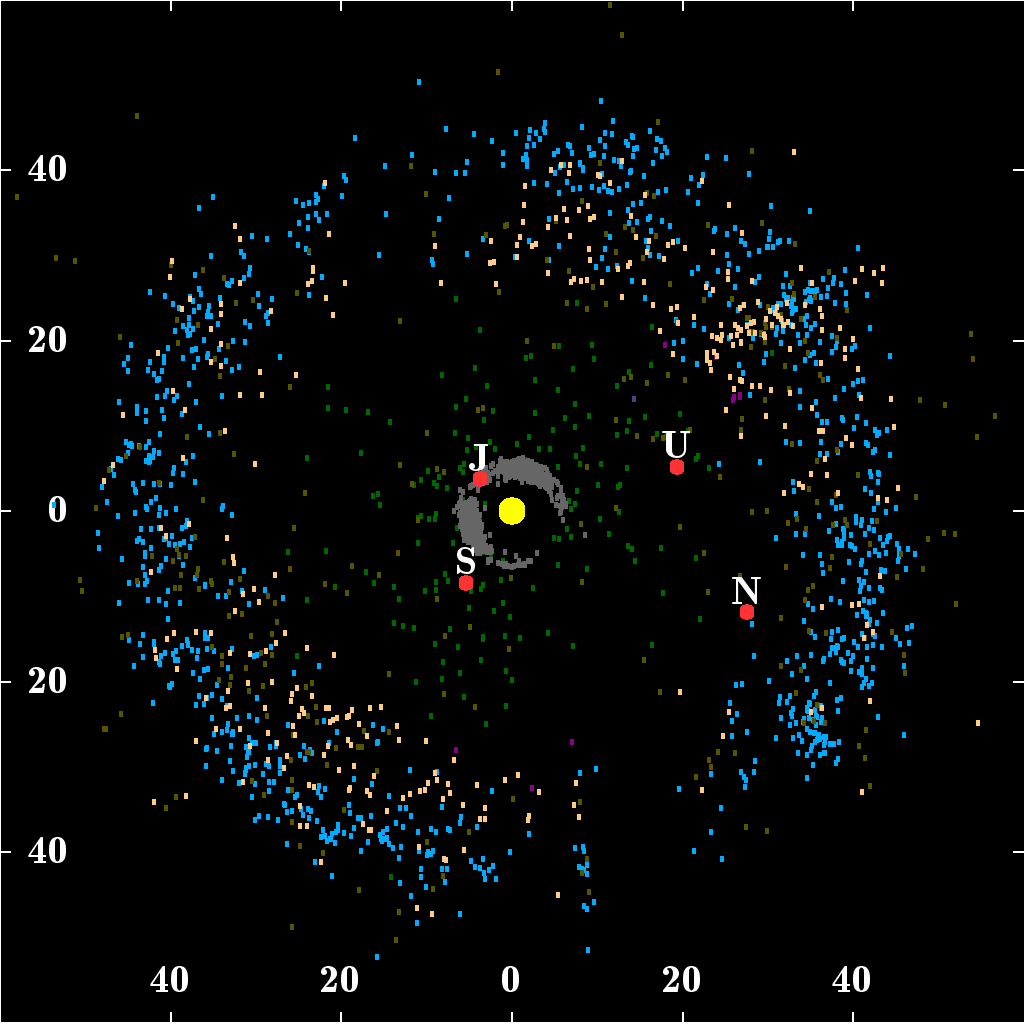
Known objects in the Kuiper belt beyond the orbit of Neptune. (Scale in AU. Distances but not sizes are to scale; the yellow disk is about the size of Mars's orbit. Epoch as of January 2015.) Sun Jupiter trojans Giant planets: J; S; U; N; Centaurs Neptune trojans Resonant Kuiper belt Classical Kuiper belt Scattered disc

The Kuiper belt (/ˈkaɪpər/) is a circumstellar disc in the outer Solar System that extends from the orbit of Neptune at 30 astronomical units (AU) to approximately 50 AU from the Sun. It is similar to the asteroid belt, but is far larger—20 times as wide and 20–200 times as massive. Like the asteroid belt, it consists mainly of small bodies or remnants from when the Solar System formed. While many asteroids are composed primarily of rock and metal, most Kuiper belt objects are composed largely of frozen volatiles (termed "ices"), such as methane, ammonia, and water. The Kuiper belt is home to most of the objects that astronomers generally accept as dwarf planets: Orcus, Pluto, Haumea, Quaoar, and Makemake. Some of the Solar System's moons, such as Neptune's Triton and Saturn's Phoebe, may have originated in the region.

The Kuiper belt is named in honor of the Dutch astronomer Gerard Kuiper, who conjectured the existence of a version of the belt in 1951. There were researchers before and after him who proposed similar hypotheses, such as Kenneth Edgeworth in the 1930s. The most direct prediction of the belt was by astronomer Julio Ángel Fernández, who published a paper in 1980 suggesting the existence of a comet belt beyond Neptune which could serve as a source for short-period comets.

In 1992, minor planet 15760 Albion was discovered, the first Kuiper belt object (KBO) since Pluto (in 1930) and Charon (in 1978). Since its discovery, the number of known KBOs has increased to thousands, and more than 100000 KBOs over 100 km (62 mi) in diameter are thought to exist. The Kuiper belt was initially thought to be the main repository for periodic comets, those with orbits lasting less than 200 years. Studies since the mid-1990s have shown that the belt is dynamically stable and that comets' true place of origin is the scattered disc, a dynamically active zone created by the outward motion of Neptune 4.5 billion years ago; scattered-disc objects such as Eris have extremely eccentric orbits that take them as far as 100 AU from the Sun. (Note: The literature is inconsistent in the usage of the terms scattered disc and Kuiper belt. For some, they are distinct populations; for others, the scattered disc is part of the Kuiper belt. Authors may even switch between these two uses in one publication. Because the International Astronomical Union's Minor Planet Center, the body responsible for cataloguing minor planets in the Solar System, makes the distinction, the editorial choice for Wikipedia articles on the trans-Neptunian region is to make this distinction as well. On Wikipedia, Eris, the most massive known trans-Neptunian object, is not part of the Kuiper belt and this makes Pluto the most massive Kuiper belt object.)

The Kuiper belt is distinct from the hypothesized Oort cloud, which is believed to be a thousand times more distant and mostly spherical. The objects within the Kuiper belt, together with the members of the scattered disc and any potential Hills cloud or Oort cloud objects, are collectively referred to as trans-Neptunian objects (TNOs). Pluto is the largest and most massive known member of the Kuiper belt and the largest and the second-most-massive known TNO, surpassed only by Eris in the scattered disc. Originally considered a planet, Pluto's status as part of the Kuiper belt caused it to be reclassified as a dwarf planet in 2006. It is compositionally similar to many other objects of the Kuiper belt, and its orbital period is characteristic of a class of KBOs, known as "plutinos", that share the same 2:3 resonance with Neptune.

The Kuiper belt and Neptune may be treated as a marker of the extent of the Solar System, alternatives being the heliopause and the distance at which the Sun's gravitational influence is matched by that of other stars (estimated to be between 50000 and 125000 AU).

== History ==
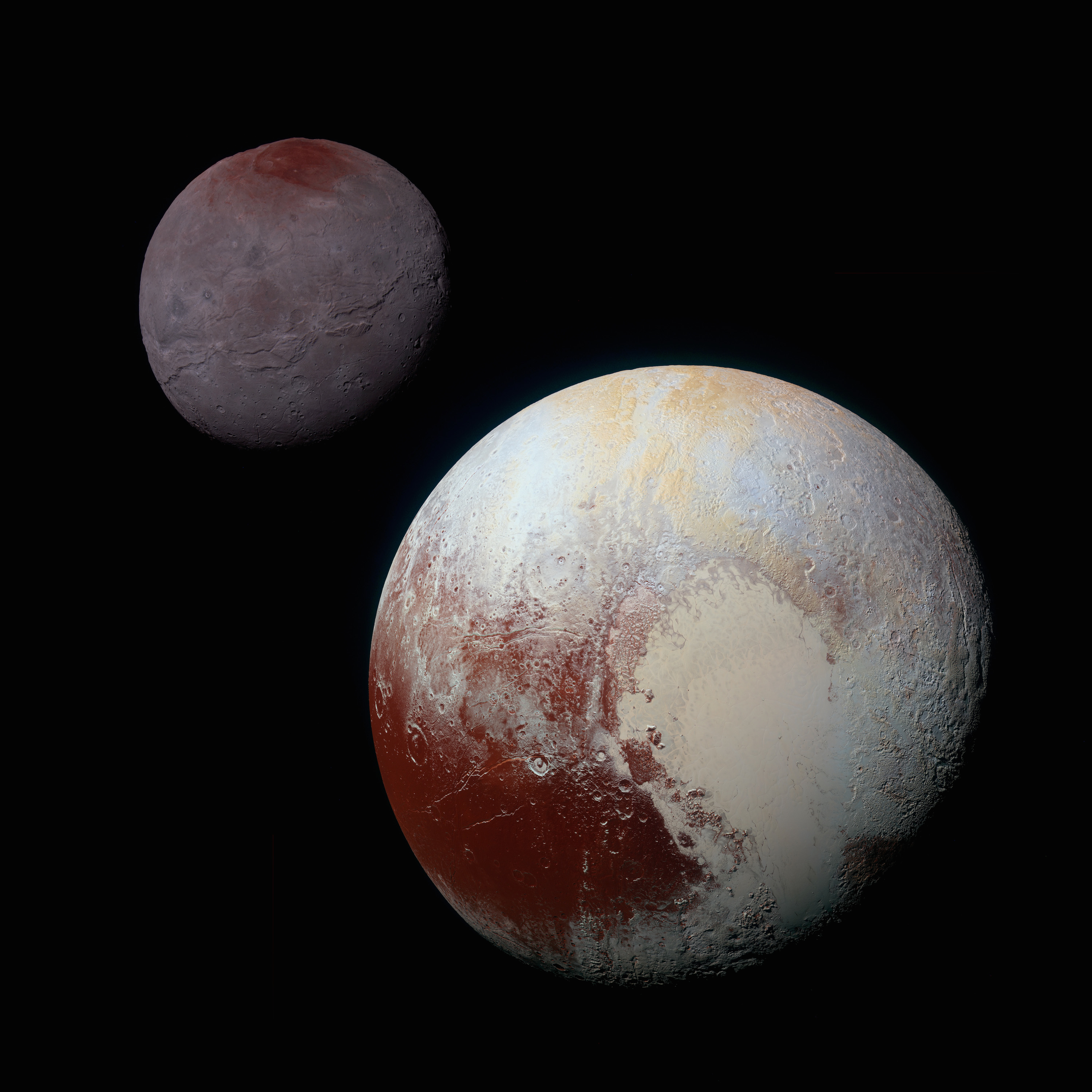
Pluto and Charon in false color

After the discovery of Pluto in 1930, many speculated that it might not be alone. The region now called the Kuiper belt was hypothesized in various forms for decades. It was only in 1992 that the first direct evidence for its existence was found. The number and variety of prior speculations on the nature of the Kuiper belt have led to continued uncertainty as to who deserves credit for first proposing it.

=== Hypotheses ===
The first astronomer to suggest the existence of a trans-Neptunian population was Frederick C. Leonard. Soon after Pluto's discovery by Clyde Tombaugh in 1930, Leonard pondered whether it was "likely that in Pluto there has come to light the first of a series of ultra-Neptunian bodies, the remaining members of which still await discovery but which are destined eventually to be detected". That same year, astronomer Armin O. Leuschner suggested that Pluto "may be one of many long-period planetary objects yet to be discovered".

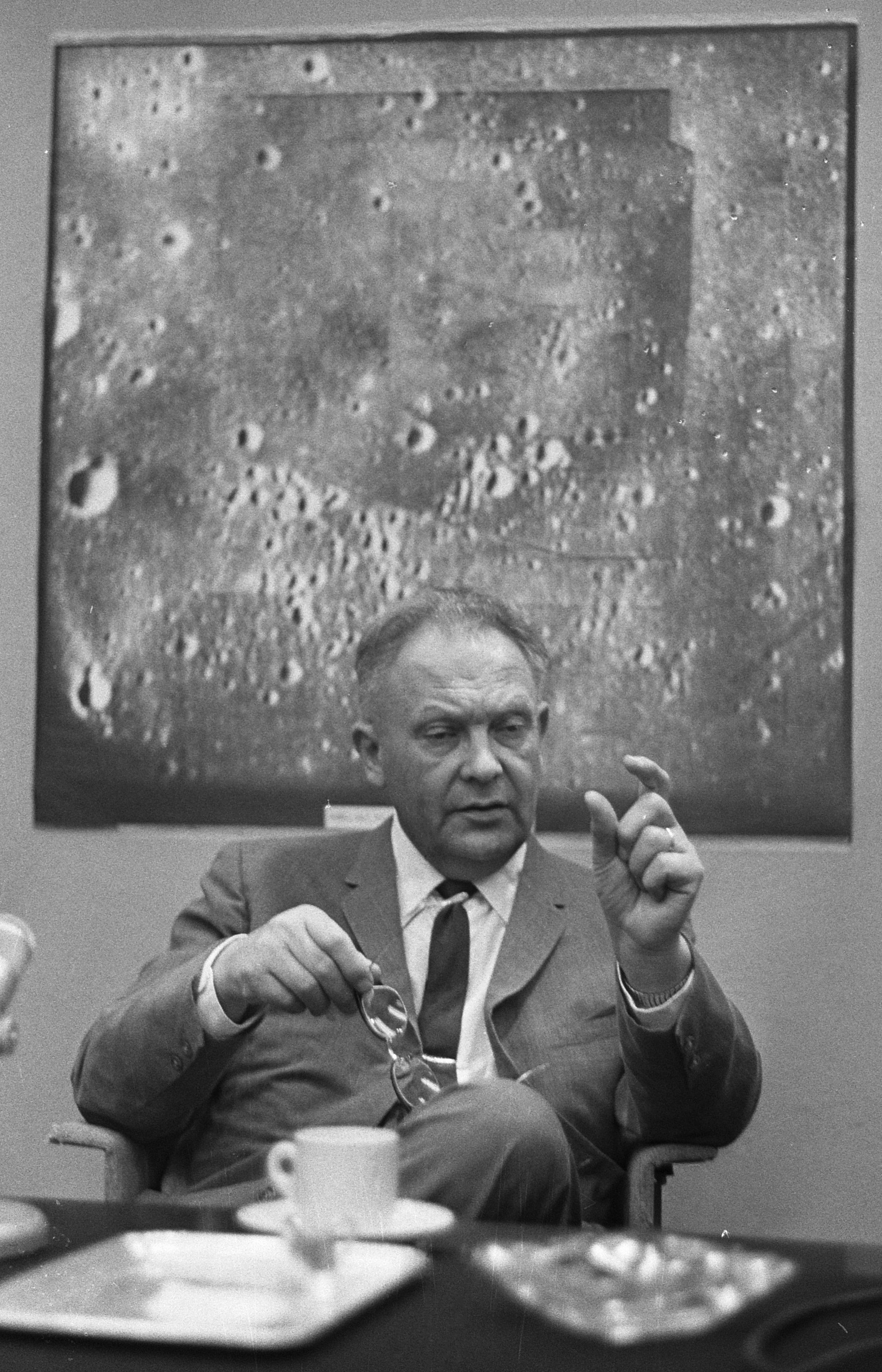
Astronomer Gerard Kuiper, after whom the Kuiper belt is named

In 1943, in the Journal of the British Astronomical Association, Kenneth Edgeworth hypothesized that, in the region beyond Neptune, the material within the primordial solar nebula was too widely spaced to condense into planets, and so rather condensed into a myriad smaller bodies. From this he concluded that "the outer region of the solar system, beyond the orbits of the planets, is occupied by a very large number of comparatively small bodies" and that, from time to time, one of their number "wanders from its own sphere and appears as an occasional visitor to the inner solar system", becoming a comet.

In 1951, in a paper in Astrophysics: A Topical Symposium, Gerard Kuiper speculated on a similar disc having formed early in the Solar System's evolution and concluded that the disc consisted of "remnants of original clusterings which have lost many members that became stray asteroids, much as has occurred with open galactic clusters dissolving into stars". In another paper, based upon a lecture Kuiper gave in 1950, also called On the Origin of the Solar System, Kuiper wrote about the "outermost region of the solar nebula, from 38 to 50 astr. units (i.e., just outside proto-Neptune)" where "condensation products (ices of H_{2}O, NH_{3}, CH_{4}, etc.) must have formed, and the flakes must have slowly collected and formed larger aggregates, estimated to range up to 1 km or more in size". He continued to write that "these condensations appear to account for the comets, in size, number and composition". According to Kuiper "the planet Pluto, which sweeps through the whole zone from 30 to 50 astr. units, is held responsible for having started the scattering of the comets throughout the solar system". Kuiper was operating on the assumption, common in his time, that Pluto was far more massive than we now know it to be, and had therefore scattered these bodies out toward the Oort cloud or out of the Solar System; there would not be a Kuiper belt today if this were correct.

The hypothesis took many other forms in the following decades. In 1962, physicist Alastair G. W. Cameron postulated the existence of "a tremendous mass of small material on the outskirts of the solar system". In 1964, Fred Whipple, who popularised the famous "dirty snowball" hypothesis for cometary structure, thought that a "comet belt" might be massive enough to cause the purported discrepancies in the orbit of Uranus that had sparked the search for Planet X, or, at the very least, massive enough to affect the orbits of known comets. Observation ruled out this hypothesis.

In 1977, Charles Kowal discovered 2060 Chiron, an icy object with an orbit between Saturn and Uranus. He used a blink comparator, the same device that had allowed Clyde Tombaugh to discover Pluto nearly 50 years before. In 1992, another object, 5145 Pholus, was discovered in a similar orbit. Today, an entire population of comet-like bodies, called the centaurs, is known to exist in the region between Jupiter and Neptune. The centaurs' orbits are unstable and have dynamical lifetimes of a few million years. From the time of Chiron's discovery in 1977, astronomers have speculated that the centaurs therefore must be frequently replenished by some outer reservoir.

Further evidence for the existence of the Kuiper belt later emerged from the study of comets. That comets have finite lifespans has been known for some time. As they approach the Sun, its heat causes their volatile surfaces to sublimate into space, gradually dispersing them. In order for comets to continue to be visible over the age of the Solar System, they must be replenished frequently. A proposal for such an area of replenishment is the Oort cloud, possibly a spherical swarm of comets extending beyond 50,000 AU from the Sun first hypothesised by Dutch astronomer Jan Oort in 1950. The Oort cloud is thought to be the point of origin of long-period comets, which are those, like Hale–Bopp, with orbits lasting thousands of years.

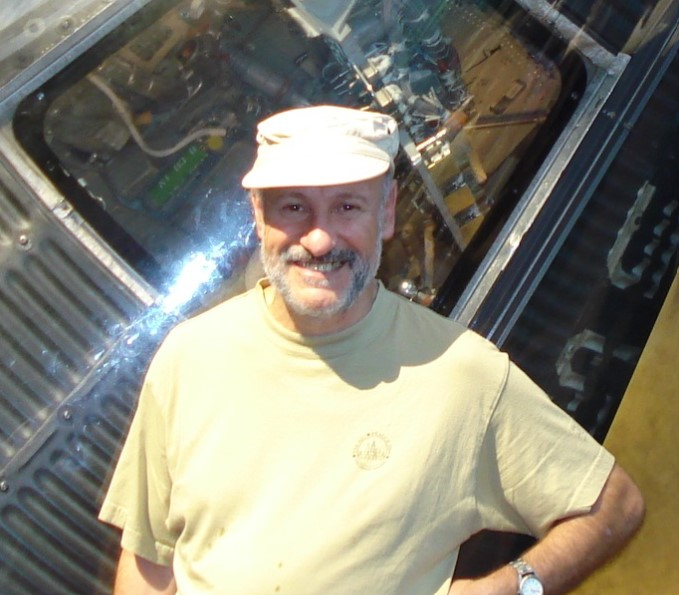
In 1980, astronomer Julio Fernandez predicted the existence of a belt. It has been said that because the words "Kuiper" and "comet belt" appeared in the opening sentence of Fernandez's paper, this hypothetical region was referred to as the "Kuiper belt".

There is another comet population, known as short-period or periodic comets, consisting of those comets that, like Halley's Comet, have orbital periods of less than 200 years. By the 1970s, the rate at which short-period comets were being discovered was becoming increasingly inconsistent with their having emerged solely from the Oort cloud. For an Oort cloud object to become a short-period comet, it would first have to be captured by the giant planets. In a paper published in Monthly Notices of the Royal Astronomical Society in 1980, Uruguayan astronomer Julio Fernández stated that for every short-period comet to be sent into the inner Solar System from the Oort cloud, 600 would have to be ejected into interstellar space. He speculated that a comet belt from between 35 and 50 AU would be required to account for the observed number of comets. Following up on Fernández's work, in 1988 the Canadian team of Martin Duncan, Tom Quinn and Scott Tremaine ran a number of computer simulations to determine if all observed comets could have arrived from the Oort cloud. They found that the Oort cloud could not account for all short-period comets, particularly as short-period comets are clustered near the plane of the Solar System, whereas Oort-cloud comets tend to arrive from any point in the sky. With a "belt", as Fernández described it, added to the formulations, the simulations matched observations. Reportedly because the words "Kuiper" and "comet belt" appeared in the opening paragraph of Fernández's paper, Tremaine named this hypothetical region the "Kuiper belt".

=== Discovery ===
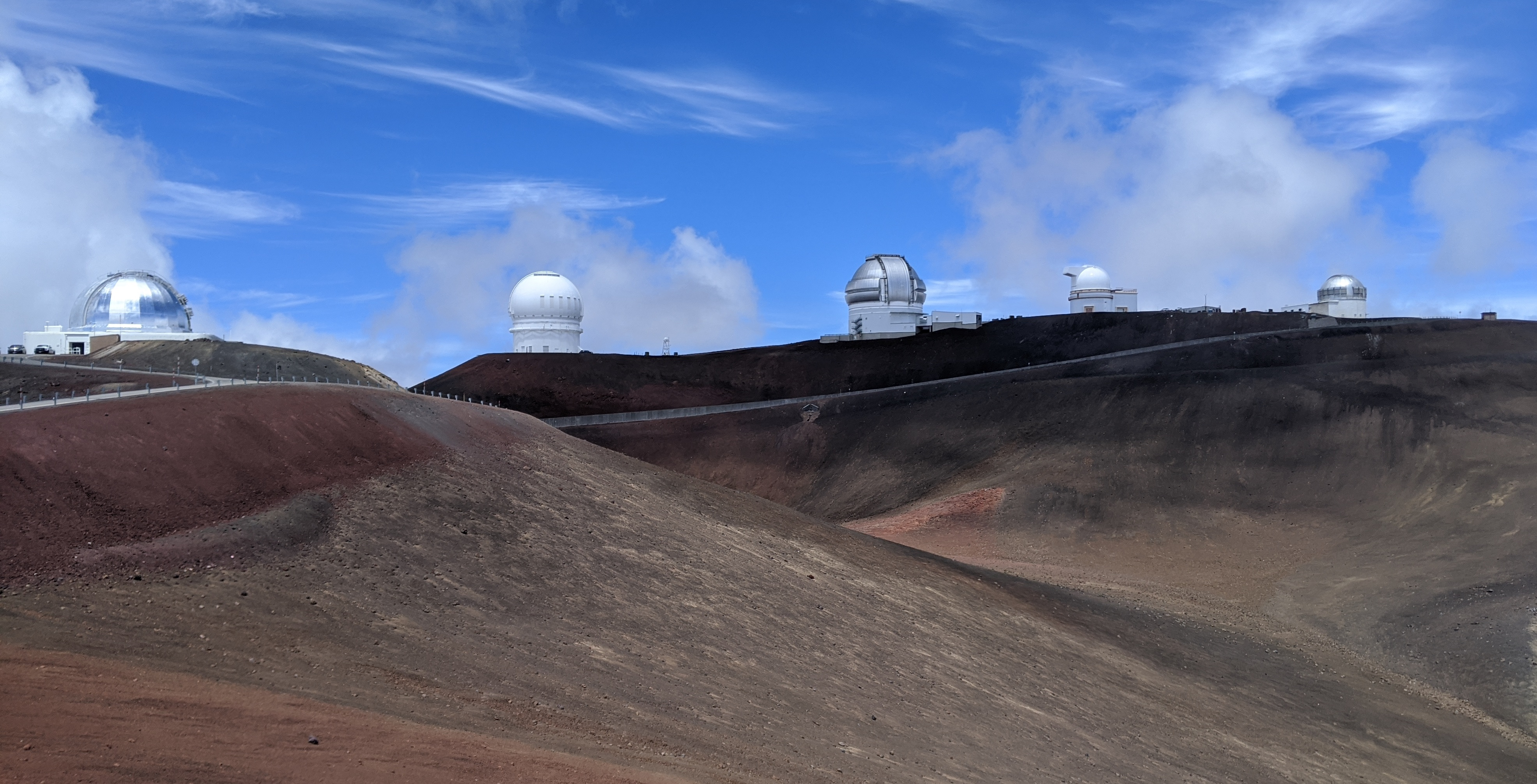
Telescopes atop Mauna Kea. The Kuiper belt was discovered with UH88, which is the fourth from the left

In 1987, astronomer David C. Jewitt, then at MIT, became increasingly puzzled by "the apparent emptiness of the outer Solar System". He encouraged then-graduate student Jane Luu to aid him in his endeavour to locate another object beyond Pluto's orbit, because, as he told her, "If we don't, nobody will." Using telescopes at the Kitt Peak National Observatory in Arizona and the Cerro Tololo Inter-American Observatory in Chile, Jewitt and Luu conducted their search in much the same way as Clyde Tombaugh and Charles Kowal had, with a blink comparator. Initially, examination of each pair of plates took about eight hours, but the process was sped up with the arrival of electronic charge-coupled devices or CCDs, which, though their field of view was narrower, were not only more efficient at collecting light (they retained 90% of the light that hit them, rather than the 10% achieved by photographs) but allowed the blinking process to be done virtually, on a computer screen. Today, CCDs form the basis for most astronomical detectors. In 1988, Jewitt moved to the Institute of Astronomy at the University of Hawaii. Luu later joined him to work at the University of Hawaii's 2.24 m telescope at Mauna Kea. Eventually, the field of view for CCDs had increased to 1024 by 1024 pixels, which allowed searches to be conducted far more rapidly. Finally, after five years of searching, Jewitt and Luu announced on 30 August 1992 the "Discovery of the candidate Kuiper belt object 1992 QB_{1}". This object would later be named 15760 Albion. Six months later, they discovered a second object in the region, (181708) 1993 FW. By 2018, over 2000 Kuiper belt objects had been discovered.

Over one thousand bodies were found in a belt in the twenty years (1992–2012), after finding 1992 QB_{1} (named in 2018, 15760 Albion), showing a vast belt of bodies in addition to Pluto and Albion. Even in the 2010s the full extent and nature of Kuiper belt bodies was largely unknown. Finally, the unmanned spacecraft New Horizons conducted the first KBO flybys, providing much closer observations of the Plutonian system (2015) and then Arrokoth (2019).

Studies conducted since the trans-Neptunian region was first charted have shown that the region now called the Kuiper belt is not the point of origin of short-period comets, but that they instead derive from a linked population called the scattered disc. The scattered disc was created when Neptune migrated outward into the proto-Kuiper belt, which at the time was much closer to the Sun, and left in its wake a population of dynamically stable objects that could never be affected by its orbit (the Kuiper belt proper), and a population whose perihelia are close enough that Neptune can still disturb them as it travels around the Sun (the scattered disc). Because the scattered disc is dynamically active and the Kuiper belt relatively dynamically stable, the scattered disc is now seen as the most likely point of origin for periodic comets.

=== Name ===
Astronomers sometimes use the alternative name Edgeworth–Kuiper belt to credit Edgeworth, and KBOs are occasionally referred to as EKOs. Brian G. Marsden claims that neither deserves true credit: "Neither Edgeworth nor Kuiper wrote about anything remotely like what we are now seeing, but Fred Whipple did". David Jewitt comments: "If anything ... Fernández most nearly deserves the credit for predicting the Kuiper Belt."

KBOs are sometimes called "kuiperoids", a name suggested by Clyde Tombaugh. The term "trans-Neptunian object" (TNO) is recommended for objects in the belt by several scientific groups because the term is less controversial than all others—it is not an exact synonym, though, as TNOs include all objects orbiting the Sun past the orbit of Neptune, not just those in the Kuiper belt.

== Structure ==
At its fullest extent, including its outlying regions (but excluding the scattered disc), the Kuiper belt stretches from roughly 30–55 AU. The main body of the belt is generally accepted to extend from the 2:3 mean-motion resonance (see below) at 39.5 AU to the 1:2 resonance at roughly 48 AU. The Kuiper belt is quite thick, with the main concentration extending as much as ten degrees outside the ecliptic plane and a more diffuse distribution of objects extending several times farther. Overall it more resembles a torus or doughnut than a belt. Its mean position is inclined to the ecliptic by 1.86 degrees.

The presence of Neptune has a profound effect on the Kuiper belt's structure due to orbital resonances. Over a timescale comparable to the age of the Solar System, Neptune's gravity destabilises the orbits of any objects that happen to lie in certain regions, and either sends them into the inner Solar System or out into the scattered disc or interstellar space. This causes the Kuiper belt to have pronounced gaps in its current layout, similar to the Kirkwood gaps in the asteroid belt. In the region between 40 and 42 AU, for instance, no objects can retain a stable orbit over such times, and any observed in that region must have migrated there relatively recently.

Semi-major axis and eccentricity structure of the Kuiper belt. Plutinos are in orange, while other resonant objects are in red. Non-resonant hot cubewanos are in sky blue, while cold cubewanos are dark blue. The Haumea collisional family is slate blue. Notable objects are labeled.

=== Classical belt ===
Between the 2:3 and 1:2 resonances with Neptune, at approximately 42–48 AU, the gravitational interactions with Neptune occur over an extended timescale, and objects can exist with their orbits essentially unaltered. This region is known as the classical Kuiper belt, and its members comprise roughly two thirds of KBOs observed to date. Because the first modern KBO discovered (Albion, but long called 1992 QB_{1}), is considered the prototype of this group, classical KBOs are often referred to as cubewanos ("Q-B-1-os"). The guidelines established by the IAU demand that classical KBOs be given names of mythological beings associated with creation.

The classical Kuiper belt appears to be a composite of two separate populations. The first, known as the "dynamically cold" population, has orbits much like the planets; nearly circular, with an orbital eccentricity of less than 0.1, and with relatively low inclinations up to about 10° (they lie close to the plane of the Solar System rather than at an angle). The cold population also contains a concentration of objects, referred to as the kernel, with semi-major axes at 44–44.5 AU. The second, the "dynamically hot" population, has orbits much more inclined to the ecliptic, by up to 30°. The two populations have been named this way not because of any major difference in temperature, but from analogy to particles in a gas, which increase their relative velocity as they become heated up. Not only are the two populations in different orbits, the cold population also differs in color and albedo, being redder and brighter, has a larger fraction of binary objects, has a different size distribution, and lacks very large objects. The mass of the dynamically cold population is roughly 30 times less than the mass of the hot. The difference in colors may be a reflection of different compositions, which suggests they formed in different regions. The hot population is proposed to have formed near Neptune's original orbit and to have been scattered out during the migration of the giant planets. The cold population, on the other hand, has been proposed to have formed more or less in its current position because the loose binaries would be unlikely to survive encounters with Neptune. Although the Nice model appears to be able to at least partially explain a compositional difference, it has also been suggested the color difference may reflect differences in surface evolution.

=== Resonances ===
Plot of trans-Neptunian objects highlighting orbital resonances. Plutinos are in orange, while other resonant objects are in red. Non-resonant cubewanos and scattered disk objects are in blue and grey

Orbit classification (schematic of semi-major axes)

When an object's orbital period is an exact ratio of Neptune's (a situation called a mean-motion resonance), then it can become locked in a synchronised motion with Neptune and avoid being perturbed away if their relative alignments are appropriate. If, for instance, an object orbits the Sun twice for every three Neptune orbits, and if it reaches perihelion with Neptune a quarter of an orbit away from it, then whenever it returns to perihelion, Neptune will always be in about the same relative position as it began, because it will have completed 1 1/2 orbits in the same time. This is known as the 2:3 (or 3:2) resonance, and it corresponds to a characteristic semi-major axis of about 39.4 AU. This 2:3 resonance is populated by about 200 known objects, including Pluto together with its moons. In recognition of this, the members of this family are known as plutinos. Many plutinos, including Pluto, have orbits that cross that of Neptune, although their resonance means they can never collide. Plutinos have high orbital eccentricities, suggesting that they are not native to their current positions but were instead thrown haphazardly into their orbits by the migrating Neptune. IAU guidelines dictate that all plutinos must, like Pluto, be named for underworld deities. The 1:2 resonance (whose objects complete half an orbit for each of Neptune's) corresponds to semi-major axes of ~47.7 AU, and is sparsely populated. Its residents are sometimes referred to as twotinos. Other resonances also exist at 3:4, 3:5, 4:7, and 2:5. Neptune has a number of trojan objects, which occupy its Lagrangian points, gravitationally stable regions leading and trailing it in its orbit. Neptune trojans are in a 1:1 mean-motion resonance with Neptune and often have very stable orbits.

Additionally, there is a relative absence of objects with semi-major axes below 39 AU that cannot apparently be explained by the present resonances. The currently accepted hypothesis for the cause of this is that as Neptune migrated outward, unstable orbital resonances moved gradually through this region, and thus any objects within it were swept up, or gravitationally ejected from it.

=== Kuiper cliff ===
Histogram of the semi-major axes of Kuiper belt objects with inclinations above and below 5 degrees. Spikes from the plutinos and the 'kernel' are visible at 39–40 AU and 44 AU.

The 1:2 resonance at 47.8 AU appears to be an edge beyond which few objects are known. It is not clear whether it is actually the outer edge of the classical belt or just the beginning of a broad gap. Objects have been detected at the 2:5 resonance at roughly 55 AU, well outside the classical belt; predictions of a large number of bodies in classical orbits between these resonances have not been verified through observation.

Based on estimations of the primordial mass required to form Uranus and Neptune, as well as bodies as large as Pluto (see § Mass and size distribution), earlier models of the Kuiper belt had suggested that the number of large objects would increase by a factor of two beyond 50 AU, so this sudden drastic falloff, known as the Kuiper cliff, was unexpected, and to date its cause is unknown. Bernstein, Trilling, et al. (2003) found evidence that the rapid decline in objects of 100 km or more in radius beyond 50 AU is real, and not due to observational bias. Possible explanations include that material at that distance was too scarce or too scattered to accrete into large objects, or that subsequent processes removed or destroyed those that did. Patryk Lykawka of Kobe University claimed that the gravitational attraction of an unseen large planetary object, perhaps the size of Earth or Mars, might be responsible. An analysis of the TNO data available prior to September 2023 shows that the distribution of objects at the outer rim of the classical Kuiper belt resembles that of the outer main asteroid belt with a gap at about 72 AU, far from any mean-motion resonances with Neptune; the outer main asteroid belt exhibits a gap induced by the 5:6 mean-motion resonance with Jupiter at 5.875 AU.

== Origin ==
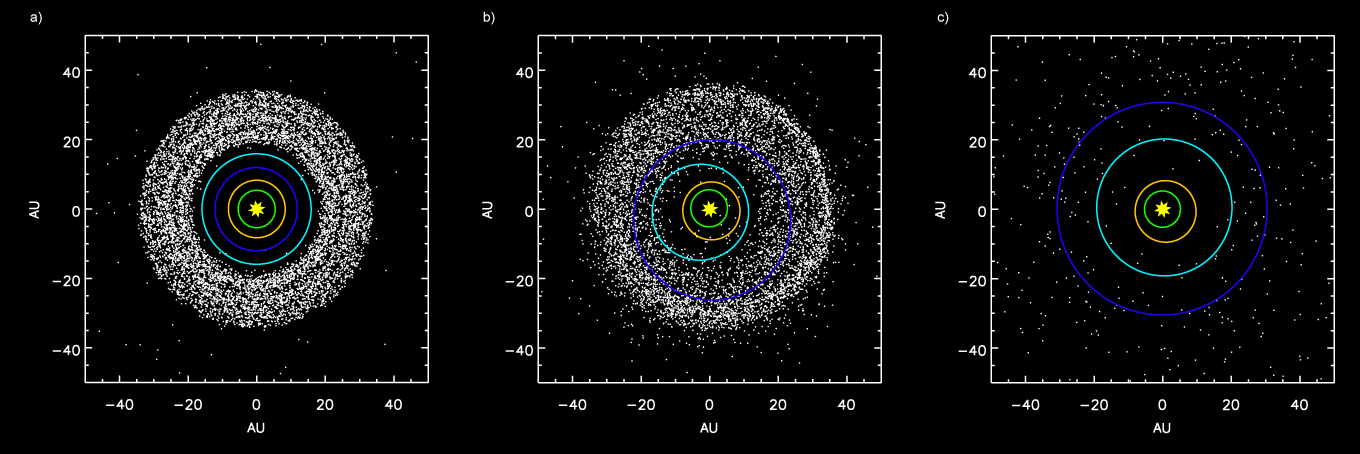
Simulation showing outer planets and Kuiper belt: (a) before Jupiter/Saturn 1:2 resonance, (b) scattering of Kuiper belt objects into the Solar System after the orbital shift of Neptune, (c) after ejection of Kuiper belt bodies by Jupiter

The precise origins of the Kuiper belt and its complex structure are still unclear, and astronomers are awaiting the completion of several wide-field survey telescopes such as Pan-STARRS and the future LSST, which should reveal many currently unknown KBOs. These surveys will provide data that will help determine answers to these questions. Pan-STARRS 1 finished its primary science mission in 2014, and the full data from the Pan-STARRS 1 surveys were published in 2019, helping reveal many more KBOs.

The Kuiper belt is thought to consist of planetesimals, fragments from the original protoplanetary disc around the Sun that failed to fully coalesce into planets and instead formed into smaller bodies, the largest less than 3,000 kilometres (1,900 mi) in diameter. Studies of the crater counts on Pluto and Charon revealed a scarcity of small craters suggesting that such objects formed directly as sizeable objects in the range of tens of kilometers in diameter rather than being accreted from much smaller, roughly kilometer scale bodies. Hypothetical mechanisms for the formation of these larger bodies include the gravitational collapse of clouds of pebbles concentrated between eddies in a turbulent protoplanetary disk or in streaming instabilities. These collapsing clouds may fragment, forming binaries.

Modern computer simulations show the Kuiper belt to have been strongly influenced by Jupiter and Neptune, and also suggest that neither Uranus nor Neptune could have formed in their present positions, because too little primordial matter existed at that range to produce objects of such high mass. Instead, these planets are estimated to have formed closer to Jupiter. Scattering of planetesimals early in the Solar System's history would have led to migration of the orbits of the giant planets: Saturn, Uranus, and Neptune drifted outwards, whereas Jupiter drifted inwards. Eventually, the orbits shifted to the point where Jupiter and Saturn reached an exact 1:2 resonance; Jupiter orbited the Sun twice for every one Saturn orbit. The gravitational repercussions of such a resonance ultimately destabilized the orbits of Uranus and Neptune, causing them to be scattered outward onto high-eccentricity orbits that crossed the primordial planetesimal disc.

While Neptune's orbit was highly eccentric, its mean-motion resonances overlapped and the orbits of the planetesimals evolved chaotically, allowing planetesimals to wander outward as far as Neptune's 1:2 resonance to form a dynamically cold belt of low-inclination objects. Later, after its eccentricity decreased, Neptune's orbit expanded outward toward its current position. Many planetesimals were captured into and remain in resonances during this migration, others evolved onto higher-inclination and lower-eccentricity orbits and escaped from the resonances onto stable orbits. Many more planetesimals were scattered inward, with small fractions being captured as Jupiter trojans, as irregular satellites orbiting the giant planets, and as outer belt asteroids. The remainder were scattered outward again by Jupiter and in most cases ejected from the Solar System reducing the primordial Kuiper belt population by 99% or more.

The original version of the currently most popular model, the "Nice model", reproduces many characteristics of the Kuiper belt such as the "cold" and "hot" populations, resonant objects, and a scattered disc, but it still fails to account for some of the characteristics of their distributions. The model predicts a higher average eccentricity in classical KBO orbits than is observed (0.10–0.13 versus 0.07) and its predicted inclination distribution contains too few high inclination objects. In addition, the frequency of binary objects in the cold belt, many of which are far apart and loosely bound, also poses a problem for the model. These are predicted to have been separated during encounters with Neptune, leading some to propose that the cold disc formed at its current location, representing the only truly local population of small bodies in the solar system.

A recent modification of the Nice model has the Solar System begin with five giant planets, including an additional ice giant, in a chain of mean-motion resonances. About 400 million years after the formation of the Solar System the resonance chain is broken. Instead of being scattered into the disc, the ice giants first migrate outward several AU. This divergent migration eventually leads to a resonance crossing, destabilizing the orbits of the planets. The extra ice giant encounters Saturn and is scattered inward onto a Jupiter-crossing orbit and after a series of encounters is ejected from the Solar System. The remaining planets then continue their migration until the planetesimal disc is nearly depleted with small fractions remaining in various locations.

As in the original Nice model, objects are captured into resonances with Neptune during its outward migration. Some remain in the resonances, others evolve onto higher-inclination, lower-eccentricity orbits, and are released onto stable orbits forming the dynamically hot classical belt. The hot belt's inclination distribution can be reproduced if Neptune migrated from 24 AU to 30 AU on a 30 Myr timescale. When Neptune migrates to 28 AU, it has a gravitational encounter with the extra ice giant. Objects captured from the cold belt into the 1:2 mean-motion resonance with Neptune are left behind as a local concentration at 44 AU when this encounter causes Neptune's semi-major axis to jump outward. The objects deposited in the cold belt include some loosely bound 'blue' binaries originating from closer than the cold belt's current location. If Neptune's eccentricity remains small during this encounter, the chaotic evolution of orbits of the original Nice model is avoided and a primordial cold belt is preserved. In the later phases of Neptune's migration, a slow sweeping of mean-motion resonances removes the higher-eccentricity objects from the cold belt, truncating its eccentricity distribution.

== Composition ==
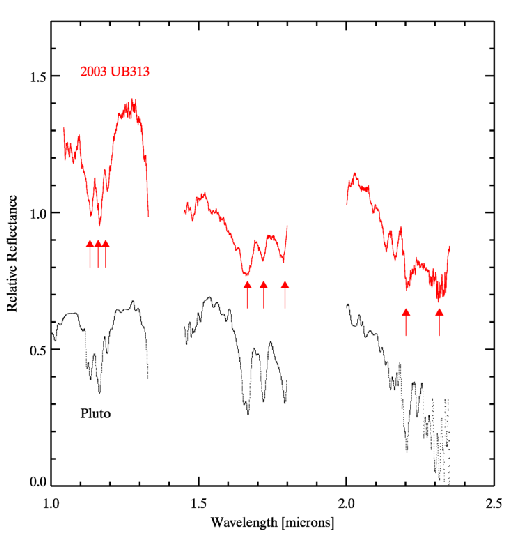
The infrared spectra of both Eris and Pluto, highlighting their common methane absorption lines

Being distant from the Sun and major planets, Kuiper belt objects are thought to be relatively unaffected by the processes that have shaped and altered other Solar System objects; thus, determining their composition would provide substantial information on the makeup of the earliest Solar System. Due to their small size and extreme distance from Earth, the chemical makeup of KBOs is very difficult to determine. The principal method by which astronomers determine the composition of a celestial object is spectroscopy. When an object's light is broken into its component colors, an image akin to a rainbow is formed. This image is called a spectrum. Different substances absorb light at different wavelengths, and when the spectrum for a specific object is unravelled, dark lines (called absorption lines) appear where the substances within it have absorbed that particular wavelength of light. Every element or compound has its own unique spectroscopic signature, and by reading an object's full spectral "fingerprint", astronomers can determine its composition.

Analysis indicates that Kuiper belt objects are composed of a mixture of rock and a variety of ices such as water, methane, and ammonia. The temperature of the belt is only about 50 K, so many compounds that would be gaseous closer to the Sun remain solid. The densities and rock–ice fractions are known for only a small number of objects for which the diameters and the masses have been determined. The diameter can be determined by imaging with a high-resolution telescope such as the Hubble Space Telescope, by the timing of an occultation when an object passes in front of a star or, most commonly, by using the albedo of an object calculated from its infrared emissions. The masses are determined using the semi-major axes and periods of satellites, which are therefore known only for a few binary objects. The densities range from less than 0.4 to 2.6 g/cm^{3}. The least dense objects are thought to be largely composed of ice and have significant porosity. The densest objects are likely composed of rock with a thin crust of ice. There is a trend of low densities for small objects and high densities for the largest objects. One possible explanation for this trend is that ice was lost from the surface layers when differentiated objects collided to form the largest objects.

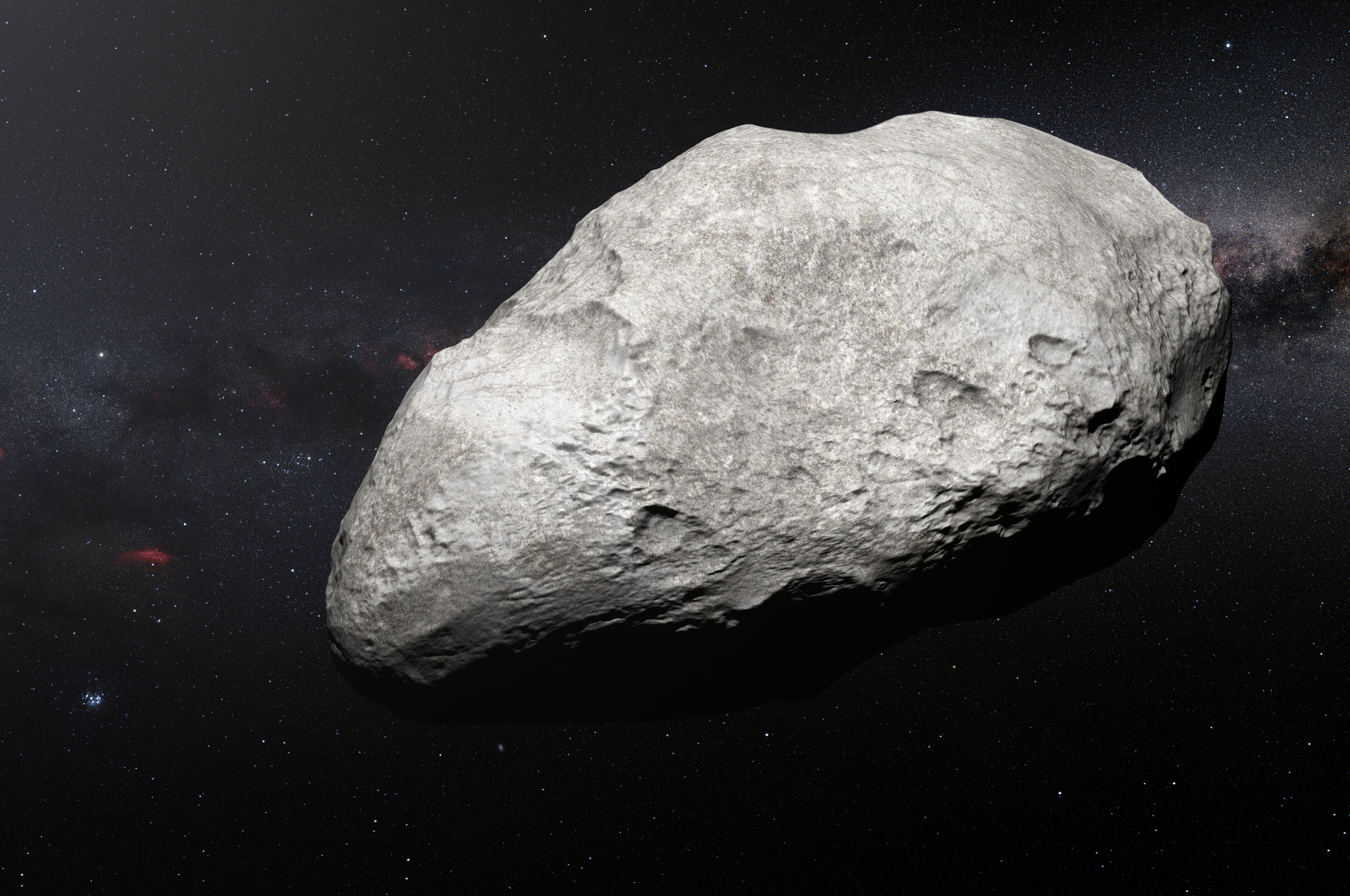
Artist's impression of plutino and possible former C-type asteroid (120216) 2004 EW95

Initially, detailed analysis of KBOs was impossible, and so astronomers were only able to determine the most basic facts about their makeup, primarily their color. These first data showed a broad range of colors among KBOs, ranging from neutral grey to deep red. This suggested that their surfaces were composed of a wide range of compounds, from dirty ices to hydrocarbons. This diversity was startling, as astronomers had expected KBOs to be uniformly dark, having lost most of the volatile ices from their surfaces to the effects of cosmic rays. Various solutions were suggested for this discrepancy, including resurfacing by impacts or outgassing. Jewitt and Luu's spectral analysis of the known Kuiper belt objects in 2001 found that the variation in color was too extreme to be easily explained by random impacts. The radiation from the Sun is thought to have chemically altered methane on the surface of KBOs, producing products such as tholins. Makemake has been shown to possess a number of hydrocarbons derived from the radiation-processing of methane, including ethane, ethylene and acetylene.

Although to date most KBOs still appear spectrally featureless due to their faintness, there have been a number of successes in determining their composition. In 1996, Robert H. Brown et al. acquired spectroscopic data on the KBO 1993 SC, which revealed that its surface composition is markedly similar to that of Pluto, as well as Neptune's moon Triton, with large amounts of methane ice. For the smaller objects, only colors and in some cases the albedos have been determined. These objects largely fall into two classes: gray with low albedos, or very red with higher albedos. The difference in colors and albedos is hypothesized to be due to the retention or the loss of hydrogen sulfide (H_{2}S) on the surface of these objects, with the surfaces of those that formed far enough from the Sun to retain H_{2}S being reddened due to irradiation.

The largest KBOs, such as Pluto and Quaoar, have surfaces rich in volatile compounds such as methane, nitrogen and carbon monoxide; the presence of these molecules is likely due to their moderate vapor pressure in the 30–50 K temperature range of the Kuiper belt. This allows them to occasionally boil off their surfaces and then fall again as snow, whereas compounds with higher boiling points would remain solid. The relative abundances of these three compounds in the largest KBOs is directly related to their surface gravity and ambient temperature, which determines which they can retain. Water ice has been detected in several KBOs, including members of the Haumea family such as 1996 TO_{66}, mid-sized objects such as 38628 Huya and 20000 Varuna, and also on some small objects. The presence of crystalline ice on large and mid-sized objects, including 50000 Quaoar where ammonia hydrate has also been detected, may indicate past tectonic activity aided by melting point lowering due to the presence of ammonia.

== Mass and size distribution ==
Despite its vast extent, the collective mass of the Kuiper belt is relatively low. The total mass of the dynamically hot population is estimated to be 1% the mass of the Earth. The dynamically cold population is estimated to be much smaller with only 0.03% the mass of the Earth. While the dynamically hot population is thought to be the remnant of a much larger population that formed closer to the Sun and was scattered outward during the migration of the giant planets, in contrast, the dynamically cold population is thought to have formed at its current location. The most recent estimate (2018) puts the total mass of the Kuiper belt at (1.97±0.30)×10^{−2} Earth masses based on the influence that it exerts on the motion of planets.

The small total mass of the dynamically cold population presents some problems for models of the Solar System's formation because a sizable mass is required for accretion of KBOs larger than 100 km (62 mi) in diameter. If the cold classical Kuiper belt had always had its current low density, these large objects simply could not have formed by the collision and mergers of smaller planetesimals. Moreover, the eccentricity and inclination of current orbits make the encounters quite "violent" resulting in destruction rather than accretion. The removal of a large fraction of the mass of the dynamically cold population is thought to be unlikely. Neptune's current influence is too weak to explain such a massive "vacuuming", and the extent of mass loss by collisional grinding is limited by the presence of loosely bound binaries in the cold disk, which are likely to be disrupted in collisions. Instead of forming from the collisions of smaller planetesimals, the larger object may have formed directly from the collapse of clouds of pebbles.

Illustration of the power law

The size distributions of the Kuiper belt objects follow a number of power laws. A power law describes the relationship between N(D) (the number of objects of diameter greater than D) and D, and is referred to as brightness slope. The number of objects is inversely proportional to some power of the diameter D:

$\frac{d N}{d D} \propto D^{-q},$ which yields (assuming q is not 1):$N\propto D^{1-q}+\text{a constant}.$

(The constant may be non-zero only if the power law does not apply at high values of D.)

Early estimates that were based on measurements of the apparent magnitude distribution found a value of q = 4 ± 0.5, which implied that there are 8 (=2^{3}) times more objects in the 100–200 km range than in the 200–400 km range.

Recent research has revealed that the size distributions of the hot classical and cold classical objects have differing slopes. The slope for the hot objects is q = 5.3 at large diameters and q = 2.0 at small diameters with the change in slope at 110 km. The slope for the cold objects is q = 8.2 at large diameters and q = 2.9 at small diameters with a change in slope at 140 km. The size distributions of the scattering objects, the plutinos, and the Neptune trojans have slopes similar to the other dynamically hot populations, but may instead have a divot, a sharp decrease in the number of objects below a specific size. This divot is hypothesized to be due to either the collisional evolution of the population, or to be due to the population having formed with no objects below this size, with the smaller objects being fragments of the original objects.

The smallest known Kuiper belt objects with radii below 1 km have only been detected by stellar occultations, as they are far too dim (magnitude 35) to be seen directly by telescopes such as the Hubble Space Telescope. The first reports of these occultations were from Schlichting et al. in December 2009, who announced the discovery of a small, sub-kilometre-radius Kuiper belt object in archival Hubble photometry from March 2007. With an estimated radius of 520±60 m or a diameter of 1040±120 m, the object was detected by Hubble's star tracking system when it briefly occulted a star for 0.3 seconds. In a subsequent study published in December 2012, Schlichting et al. performed a more thorough analysis of archival Hubble photometry and reported another occultation event by a sub-kilometre-sized Kuiper belt object, estimated to be 530±70 m in radius or 1060±140 m in diameter. From the occultation events detected in 2009 and 2012, Schlichting et al. determined the Kuiper belt object size distribution slope to be q = 3.6 ± 0.2 or q = 3.8 ± 0.2, with the assumptions of a single power law and a uniform ecliptic latitude distribution. Their result implies a strong deficit of sub-kilometer-sized Kuiper belt objects compared to extrapolations from the population of larger Kuiper belt objects with diameters above 90 km.

Observations made by NASA's New Horizons Venetia Burney Student Dust Counter showed "higher than model-predicted dust fluxes" as far as 55 AU, not explained by any existing model.

== Scattered objects ==
Comparison of the orbits of scattered disc objects (black), classical KBOs (blue), and 2:5 resonant objects (green). Orbits of other KBOs are gray. (Orbital axes have been aligned for comparison.)

The scattered disc is a sparsely populated region, overlapping with the Kuiper belt but extending to beyond 100 AU. Scattered disc objects (SDOs) have very elliptical orbits, often also very inclined to the ecliptic. Most models of Solar System formation show both KBOs and SDOs first forming in a primordial belt, with later gravitational interactions, particularly with Neptune, sending the objects outward, some into stable orbits (the KBOs) and some into unstable orbits, the scattered disc. Due to its unstable nature, the scattered disc is suspected to be the point of origin of many of the Solar System's short-period comets. Their dynamic orbits occasionally force them into the inner Solar System, first becoming centaurs, and then short-period comets.

According to the Minor Planet Center, which officially catalogues all trans-Neptunian objects, a KBO is any object that orbits exclusively within the defined Kuiper belt region regardless of origin or composition. Objects found outside the belt are classed as scattered objects. In some scientific circles the term "Kuiper belt object" has become synonymous with any icy minor planet native to the outer Solar System assumed to have been part of that initial class, even if its orbit during the bulk of Solar System history has been beyond the Kuiper belt (e.g. in the scattered-disc region). They often describe scattered disc objects as "scattered Kuiper belt objects". Eris, which is known to be more massive than Pluto, is often referred to as a KBO, but is technically an SDO. A consensus among astronomers as to the precise definition of the Kuiper belt has yet to be reached, and this issue remains unresolved.

The centaurs, which are not normally considered part of the Kuiper belt, are also thought to be scattered objects, the only difference being that they were scattered inward, rather than outward. The Minor Planet Center groups the centaurs and the SDOs together as scattered objects.

=== Triton ===
Neptune's moon Triton

During its period of migration, Neptune is thought to have captured a large KBO, Triton, which is the only large moon in the Solar System with a retrograde orbit (that is, it orbits opposite to Neptune's rotation). This suggests that, unlike the large moons of Jupiter, Saturn and Uranus, which are thought to have coalesced from rotating discs of material around their young parent planets, Triton was a fully formed body that was captured from surrounding space. Gravitational capture of an object is not easy: it requires some mechanism to slow down the object enough to be caught by the larger object's gravity. A possible explanation is that Triton was part of a binary when it encountered Neptune. (Many KBOs are members of binaries. See below.) Ejection of the other member of the binary by Neptune could then explain Triton's capture. Triton is only 14% larger than Pluto, and spectral analysis of both worlds shows that their surfaces are largely composed of similar materials, such as methane and carbon monoxide. All this points to the conclusion that Triton was once a KBO that was captured by Neptune during its outward migration.

== Largest KBOs ==
Known large objects in the Kuiper belt beyond the orbit of Neptune (Scale in AU. Distances but not sizes are to scale. Epoch as of January 2026.)

Since 2000, a number of KBOs with diameters of between 500 and 1,500 km (932 mi), more than half that of Pluto (diameter 2370 km), have been discovered. Quaoar, a classical KBO discovered in 2002, is over 1200 km across. Makemake and Haumea, both announced on 29 July 2005, are larger still. Other objects, such as 28978 Ixion (discovered in 2001) and 20000 Varuna (discovered in 2000), measure roughly 600–700 km (373–435 mi) across.

=== Pluto ===
The discovery of these large KBOs in orbits similar to Pluto's led many to conclude that, aside from its relative size, Pluto was not particularly different from other members of the Kuiper belt. Not only are these objects similar to Pluto in size, but many also have natural satellites, and are of similar composition (methane and carbon monoxide have been found both on Pluto and on the largest KBOs). Thus, just as Ceres was considered a planet before the discovery of its fellow asteroids, some began to suggest that Pluto might also be reclassified.

The issue was brought to a head by the discovery of Eris, an object in the scattered disc far beyond the Kuiper belt, that is now known to be 27% more massive than Pluto. (Eris was originally thought to be larger than Pluto by volume, but the New Horizons mission found this not to be the case.) In response, the International Astronomical Union (IAU) was forced to define what a planet is for the first time, and in so doing included in their definition that a planet must have "cleared the neighbourhood around its orbit". As Pluto shares its orbit with many other sizable objects, it was deemed not to have cleared its orbit and was thus reclassified from a planet to a dwarf planet, making it a member of the Kuiper belt.

It is not clear how many KBOs are large enough to be dwarf planets. Consideration of the surprisingly low densities of many dwarf-planet candidates suggests that not many are. Orcus, Pluto, Haumea, Quaoar, and Makemake are accepted by most astronomers; some have proposed other bodies, such as Salacia, Máni, Aya, and Ixion.

=== Satellites ===
The six largest TNOs (Eris, Pluto, Gonggong, Makemake, Haumea and Quaoar) are all known to have satellites, and two of them have more than one. A higher percentage of the larger KBOs have satellites than the smaller objects in the Kuiper belt, suggesting that a different formation mechanism was responsible. There are also a high number of binaries (two objects close enough in mass to be orbiting "each other") in the Kuiper belt. The most notable example is the Pluto–Charon binary, but it is estimated that around 11% of KBOs exist in binaries.

== Exploration ==
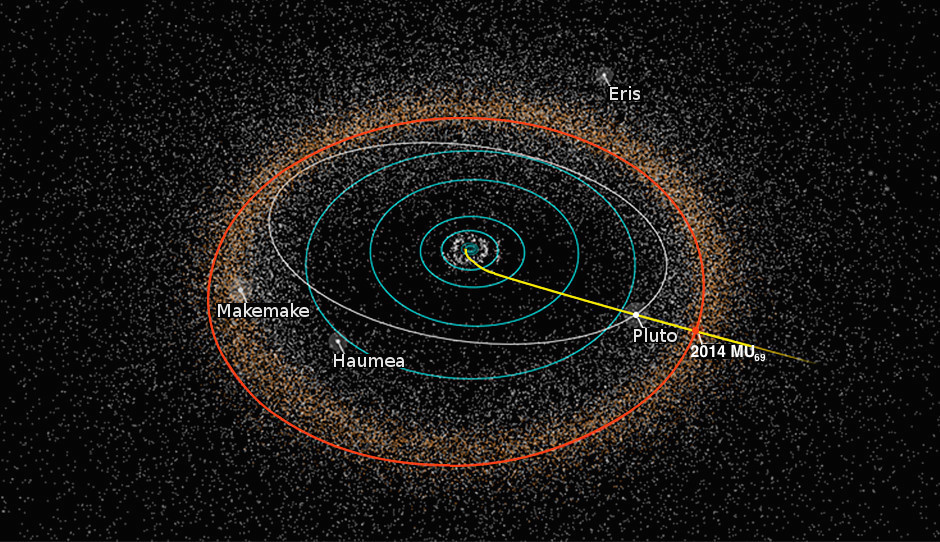
Diagram showing the location of 486958 Arrokoth and trajectory for rendezvous

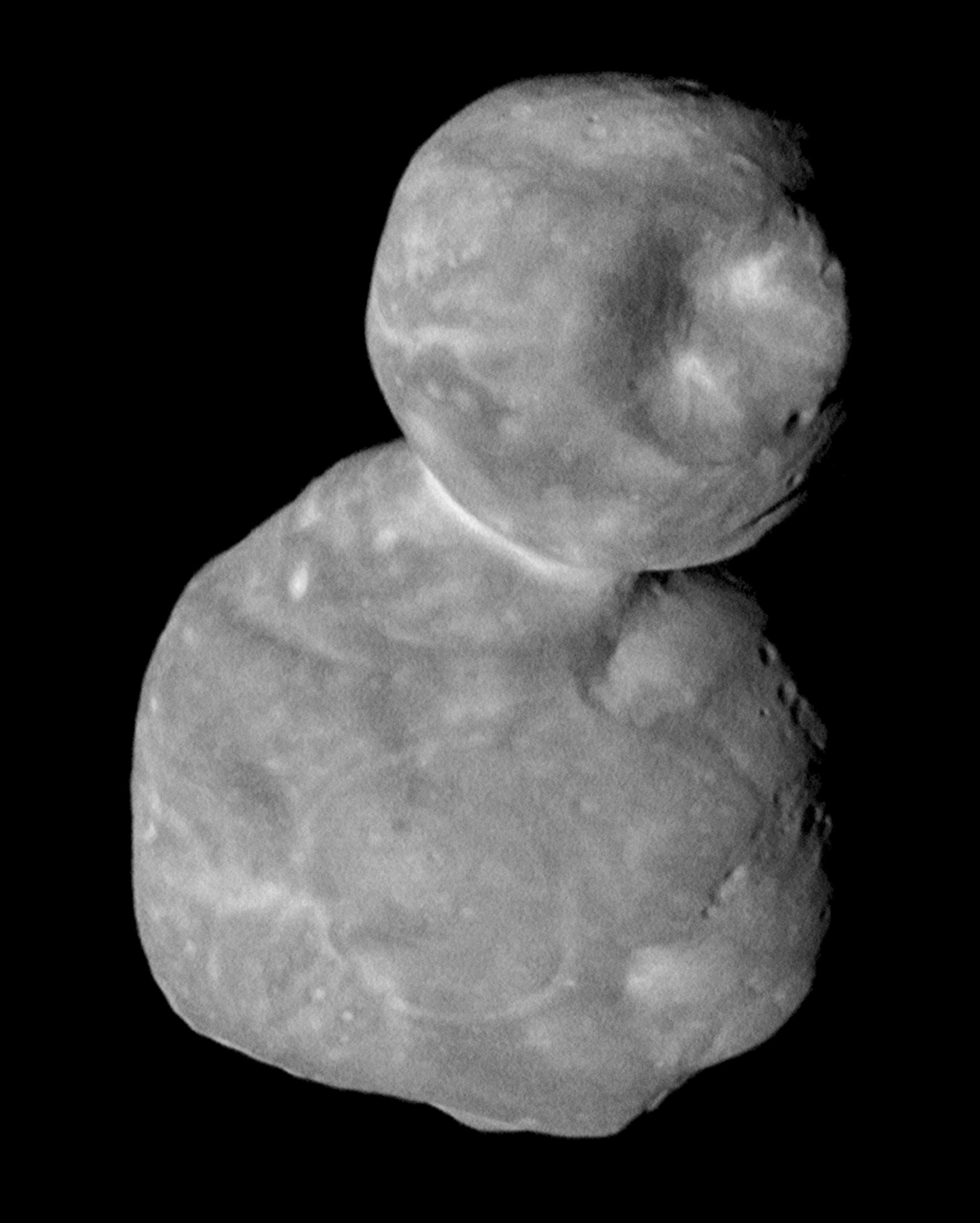
New Horizons grayscale image of Arrokoth, its surface likely covered in organic compounds. So far, it is the only Kuiper belt object besides Pluto and its satellites to be visited by a spacecraft.

On 19 January 2006, the first spacecraft to explore the Kuiper belt, New Horizons, was launched, which flew by Pluto on 14 July 2015. Beyond the Pluto flyby, the mission's goal was to locate and investigate other, farther objects in the Kuiper belt.

On 15 October 2014, it was revealed that Hubble had uncovered three potential targets, provisionally designated PT1 ("potential target 1"), PT2 and PT3 by the New Horizons team. The objects' diameters were estimated to be in the 30–55 km range; too small to be seen by ground telescopes, at distances from the Sun of 43–44 AU, which would put the encounters in the 2018–2019 period. The initial estimated probabilities that these objects were reachable within New Horizons' fuel budget were 100%, 7%, and 97%, respectively. All were members of the "cold" (low-inclination, low-eccentricity) classical Kuiper belt, and thus very different from Pluto. PT1 (given the temporary designation "1110113Y" on the HST web site), the most favorably situated object, was magnitude 26.8, 30–45 km in diameter, and was encountered in January 2019. Once sufficient orbital information was provided, the Minor Planet Center gave official designations to the three target KBOs: 2014 MU_{69} (PT1, now Arrokoth), 2014 OS393 (PT2), and 2014 PN70 (PT3). By the fall of 2014, a possible fourth target, 2014 MT69, had been eliminated by follow-up observations. PT2 was out of the running before the Pluto flyby.

On 26 August 2015, the first target, 2014 MU_{69} (nicknamed "Ultima Thule" and later named 486958 Arrokoth), was chosen. Course adjustment took place in late October and early November 2015, leading to a flyby in January 2019. On 1 July 2016, NASA approved additional funding for New Horizons to visit the object.

On 2 December 2015, New Horizons detected what was then called 1994 JR_{1} (later named 15810 Arawn) from 270 million kilometres (170×10^{6} mi) away.

On 1 January 2019, New Horizons successfully flew by Arrokoth, returning data showing Arrokoth to be a contact binary 32 km long by 16 km wide. The Ralph instrument aboard New Horizons confirmed Arrokoth's red color. Data from the fly-by will continue to be downloaded over the next 20 months.

No follow-up missions for New Horizons are planned, though at least two concepts for missions that would return to orbit or land on Pluto have been studied. Beyond Pluto, there exist many large KBOs that cannot be visited with New Horizons, such as the dwarf planets Makemake and Haumea. New missions would be tasked to explore and study these objects in detail. Thales Alenia Space has studied the logistics of an orbiter mission to Haumea, a high priority scientific target due to its status as the parent body of a collisional family that includes several other TNOs, as well as Haumea's ring and two moons. The lead author, Joel Poncy, has advocated for new technology that would allow spacecraft to reach and orbit KBOs in 10–20 years or less. New Horizons Principal Investigator Alan Stern has informally suggested missions that would flyby the planets Uranus or Neptune before visiting new KBO targets, thus furthering the exploration of the Kuiper belt while also visiting these ice giant planets for the first time since the Voyager 2 flybys in the 1980s.

=== Design studies and concept missions ===
Quaoar has been considered as a flyby target for a probe tasked with exploring the interstellar medium, as it currently lies near the heliospheric nose; Pontus Brandt at Johns Hopkins Applied Physics Laboratory and his colleagues have studied a probe that would flyby Quaoar in the 2030s before continuing to the interstellar medium through the heliospheric nose. Among their interests in Quaoar include its likely disappearing methane atmosphere and cryovolcanism. The mission studied by Brandt and his colleagues would launch using SLS and achieve 30 km/s using a Jupiter flyby. Alternatively, for an orbiter mission, a study published in 2012 concluded that Ixion and Huya are among the most feasible targets. For instance, the authors calculated that an orbiter mission could reach Ixion after 17 years cruise time if launched in 2039.

== Extrasolar Kuiper belts ==
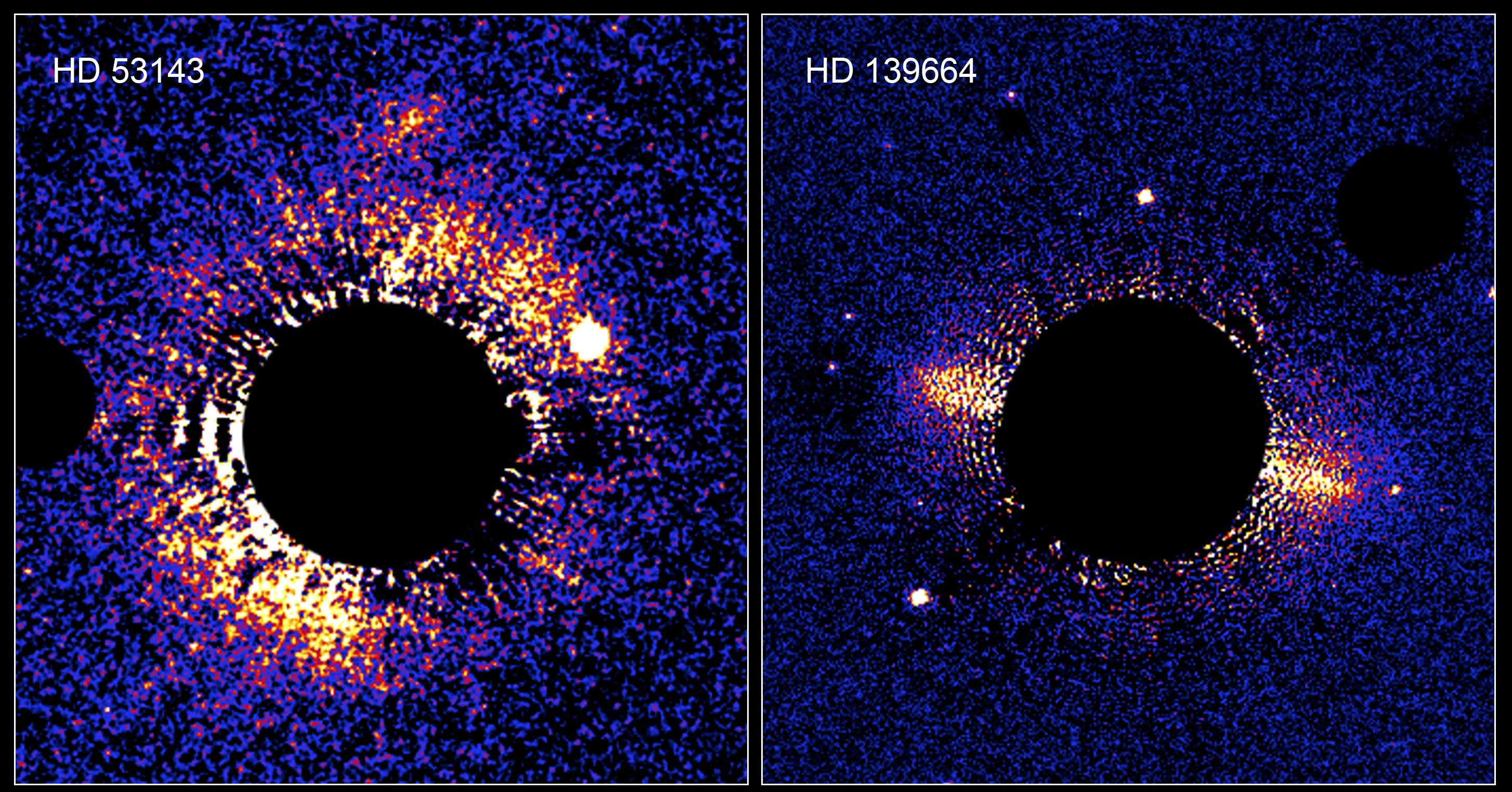
Debris discs around the stars HD 139664 and HD 53143 – black circle from camera hiding stars to display discs

By 2006, astronomers had resolved dust discs thought to be Kuiper belt-like structures around nine stars other than the Sun. They appear to fall into two categories: wide belts, with radii of over 50 AU, and narrow belts (tentatively like that of the Solar System) with radii of between 20 and 30 AU and relatively sharp boundaries. Beyond this, 15–20% of solar-type stars have an observed infrared excess that is suggestive of massive Kuiper-belt-like structures. Most known debris discs around other stars are fairly young, but the two images on the right, taken by the Hubble Space Telescope in January 2006, are old enough (roughly 300 million years) to have settled into stable configurations. The left image is a "top view" of a wide belt, and the right image is an "edge view" of a narrow belt. Computer simulations of dust in the Kuiper belt suggest that when it was younger, it may have resembled the narrow rings seen around younger stars.

== See also ==
- Asteroid belt
- List of possible dwarf planets
- List of trans-Neptunian objects
- Planet Nine
- Trans-Neptunian spectral types
