= 2011 JY31 =

Binary Kuiper belt object

2011 JY_{31}
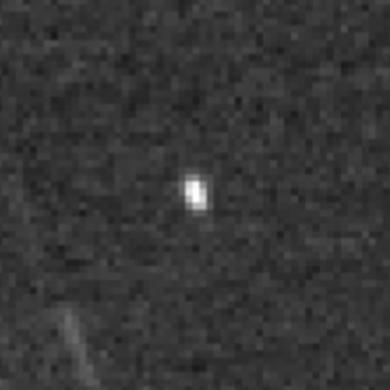
- 2011 JY_{31} imaged by the New Horizons spacecraft on 9 September 2018

Discovery
- Discovered by: New Horizons KBO Search
- Discovery site: Las Campanas Obs.
- Discovery date: 4 May 2011

Designations
- Alternative designations: VNH0008
- Minor planet category: TNO · cubewano distant · binary

Orbital characteristics
- Epoch 1 July 2021 (JD 2459396.5)
- Uncertainty parameter 4
- Observation arc: 7.4 yr
- Earliest precovery date: 28 April 2011
- Aphelion: 47.183 AU
- Perihelion: 41.518 AU
- Semi-major axis: 44.350 AU
- Eccentricity: 0.06387
- Orbital period (sidereal): 295.36 yr (107,881 d)
- Mean anomaly: 318.400°
- Mean motion: 0° 0^{m} 12.013^{s} / day
- Inclination: 2.602°
- Longitude of ascending node: 231.356°
- Argument of perihelion: 105.231°

Physical characteristics
- Mean diameter: 54–68 km (component)
- Mass: ~1.7×10^{17} kg
- Mean density: 0.5–1.0 g/cm^{3}
- Synodic rotation period: 46.62±0.06 h
- Axial tilt: 61.40°±1.35° (wrt orbit); 61.34°±1.34° (wrt ICRF pole)
- Geometric albedo: 0.147 (geometric); 0.036 (Bond)
- Spectral type: V–I=1.25±0.19
- Apparent magnitude: 24.7
- Absolute magnitude (H): 8.1±0.2; 8.8

2011 JY_{31} is a binary trans-Neptunian object from the Kuiper belt, located in the outermost region of the Solar System. It is a cold classical Kuiper belt object. 2011 JY_{31} was discovered on 4 May 2011, by a team of astronomers using one of the Magellan Telescopes in Chile during the New Horizons KBO Search for a potential flyby target for the New Horizons spacecraft. Distant observations by New Horizons from September 2018 revealed its binary nature, showing two 68 km (42 mi)-wide components in a tight, mutual orbit 200 km (120 mi) apart.

== Numbering and naming ==
This minor planet has not been numbered by the Minor Planet Center and remains unnamed.

== Physical parameters ==
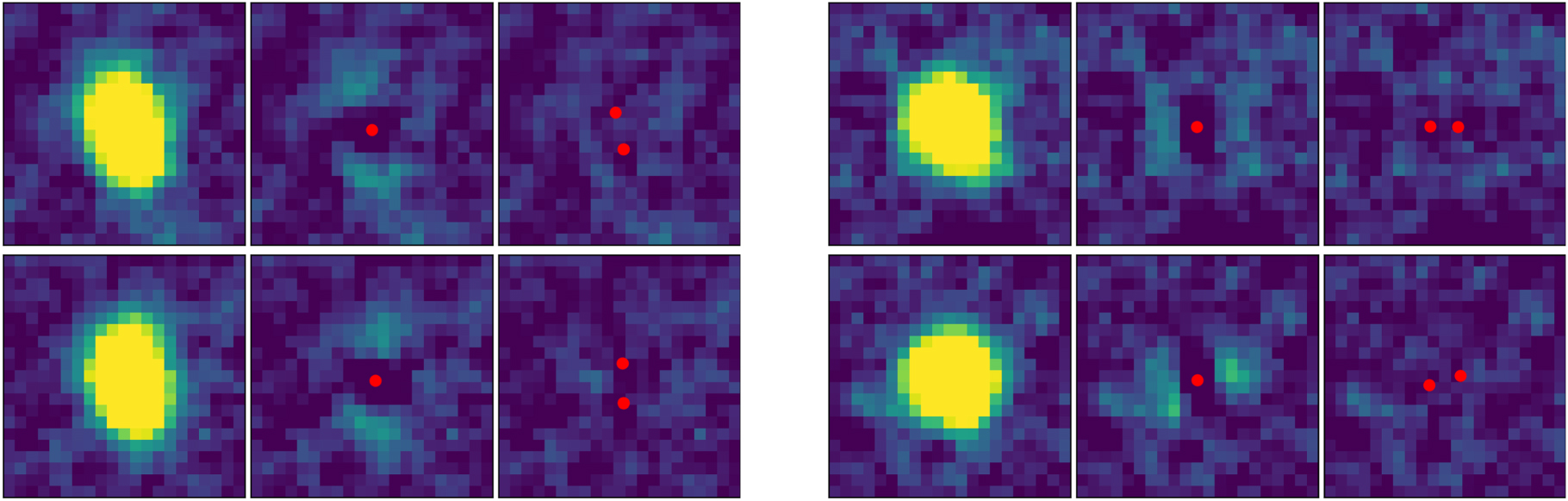
Collage of New Horizons images of 2011 JY_{31} from September 2018. A model point spread function (red) is overlaid and subtracted from the image, which reveals the two components of the 2011 JY_{31} system.

Comparison of orbital separations and diameters of trans-Neptunian close binaries

High resolution observation by the New Horizons spacecraft made it possible to estimate the parameters of the binary orbit and the system mass. Assuming that the orbit is circular the period is 46.62±0.06 h, semimajor axis is 198.6±2.9 km and the system mass is about 1.7×10^{17} kg. The components are approximately equal in size and are approximately 68 km in size assuming density of 0.5 kg/cm^{3}.

The discovery adds support to streaming instability as the dominant mechanism in the formation of tight and contact binary planetesimals such as 486958 Arrokoth, which appear to be prevalent in the cold classical Kuiper belt population.

== See also ==
- 2014 OS393, another tight binary KBO observed by New Horizons
- List of New Horizons topics
