= 2014 MT69 =

Cold classical Kuiper belt object

2014 MT_{69}
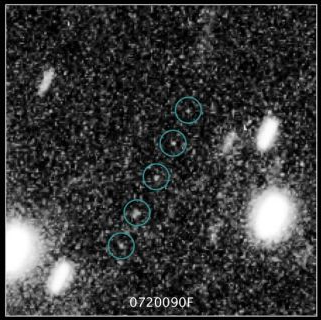
- Discovery image sequence

Discovery
- Discovered by: New Horizons KBO Search
- Discovery site: Hubble Space Telescope
- Discovery date: 24 June 2014

Designations
- Alternative designations: 0720090F · 7
- Minor planet category: TNO · cubewano distant

Orbital characteristics
- Epoch 18 July 2014 (JD 2456856.5)
- Uncertainty parameter 9
- Observation arc: 40 days
- Aphelion: 47.720 AU
- Perihelion: 38.741 AU
- Semi-major axis: 43.231 AU
- Eccentricity: 0.1038
- Orbital period (sidereal): 284.25 yr (103,822 d)
- Mean anomaly: 275.33°
- Mean motion: 0° 0^{m} 12.6^{s} ± 0° 6^{m} 46.152^{s} / day
- Inclination: 3.2251°
- Longitude of ascending node: 140.95°
- Argument of perihelion: 235.94°

Physical characteristics
- Mean diameter: 20 km (est.); 27–92 km
- Geometric albedo: 0.09 (est.); 0.04–0.15
- Apparent magnitude: 27.4
- Absolute magnitude (H): 11.7

2014 MT_{69} is a cold classical Kuiper belt object (KBO) and was formerly a potential flyby target for the New Horizons probe. The object measures approximately 20–90 kilometers (12–56 miles) in diameter.

== Discovery ==
2014 MT_{69} was discovered by the New Horizons KBO Search with the help of the Hubble Space Telescope (HST) because the object has a magnitude of 27.3, which is too faint to be observed by ground-based telescopes. Preliminary observations by the HST searching for KBO flyby targets for the New Horizons probe started in June 2014, and more intensive observations continued in July and August. 2014 MT_{69} was first discovered in observations on June 24, 2014, during the preliminary observations, but it was designated 0720090F at the time, nicknamed "7" for short. Its existence as a potential target of the New Horizons probe was revealed by NASA in October 2014, but the official name 2014 MT_{69} was not assigned by the Minor Planet Center (MPC) until March 2015 after better orbit information was available. The parameters of the orbit have the extremely large uncertainty of 9 because follow-up observations after discovery eliminated 2014 MT_{69} as a potential target of the New Horizons probe, and no further follow-up observations were made.

== Potential targets of the New Horizons mission ==
After having completed its flyby of Pluto, the New Horizons space probe was maneuvered for a flyby of at least one Kuiper belt object (KBO). Several targets were considered for the first such flyby. Potential target 2014 MT_{69} has a diameter between 20–92 km (12–57 mi), which is smaller than the other potential targets of the New Horizons probe. A potential encounter initially looked more feasible for 2014 MT_{69} than for 486958 Arrokoth, but follow-up observations eventually ruled out 2014 MT_{69} as a potential target. The potential targets for the New Horizons probe were PT1 and PT3, the KBOs Arrokoth and 2014 PN70, and the probe had sufficient fuel to maneuver to either PT1 or PT3. Potential target PT2, the KBO 2014 OS393, was eliminated for consideration as a potential target.

On 28 August 2015, the New Horizons team announced the selection of Arrokoth as the next flyby target.

== See also ==
- List of minor planets and comets visited by spacecraft
- List of missions to minor planets
- List of New Horizons topics
