= 2014 OS393 =

Classical Kuiper belt object

2014 OS_{393}
- 2014 OS_{393} imaged by the New Horizons spacecraft on 5 January 2019

Discovery
- Discovered by: New Horizons KBO Search
- Discovery site: Hubble Space Telescope
- Discovery date: 30 July 2014

Designations
- Alternative designations: e31007AI · e3 · PT2
- Minor planet category: TNO · cubewano distant · binary

Orbital characteristics
- Epoch 9 June 2026 (JD 2461200.5)
- Uncertainty parameter 7
- Observation arc: 3.07 y (1122 d)
- Aphelion: 44.6277 AU
- Perihelion: 43.1635 AU
- Semi-major axis: 43.8956 AU
- Eccentricity: 0.01668
- Orbital period (sidereal): 290.830 yr (106,226 d)
- Mean anomaly: 46.4393°
- Mean motion: 0° 0^{m} 12.24^{s} / day
- Inclination: 3.8103°
- Longitude of ascending node: 138.294°
- Argument of perihelion: 109.528°

Physical characteristics
- Mean diameter: 30 km (component); 42 km (effective)
- Synodic rotation period: 36.214 h (1.5089 d)
- Geometric albedo: 0.04–0.10; 0.04–0.15
- Spectral type: V–I = 1.18±0.05
- Apparent magnitude: 25.8
- Absolute magnitude (H): 10.1; 10.111

2014 OS_{393}, called PT2 in the press releases surrounding the New Horizons mission, is a binary trans-Neptunian object in the classical Kuiper belt, the outermost region of the Solar System. It was first observed by the New Horizons KBO Search using the Hubble Space Telescope on 30 July 2014. Until 2015, when the object 486958 Arrokoth was selected, it was a potential flyby target for the New Horizons probe. Estimated to be approximately 42 kilometres (26 mi) in diameter, the object had a poorly determined orbit as it had been observed for only a few months. With MPEC 2024-E99 the Minor Planet Center published on 6 March 2024 additional observations by New Horizons KBO Search-Subaru which allowed to compute a fairly reliable orbit.

== Discovery and designation ==
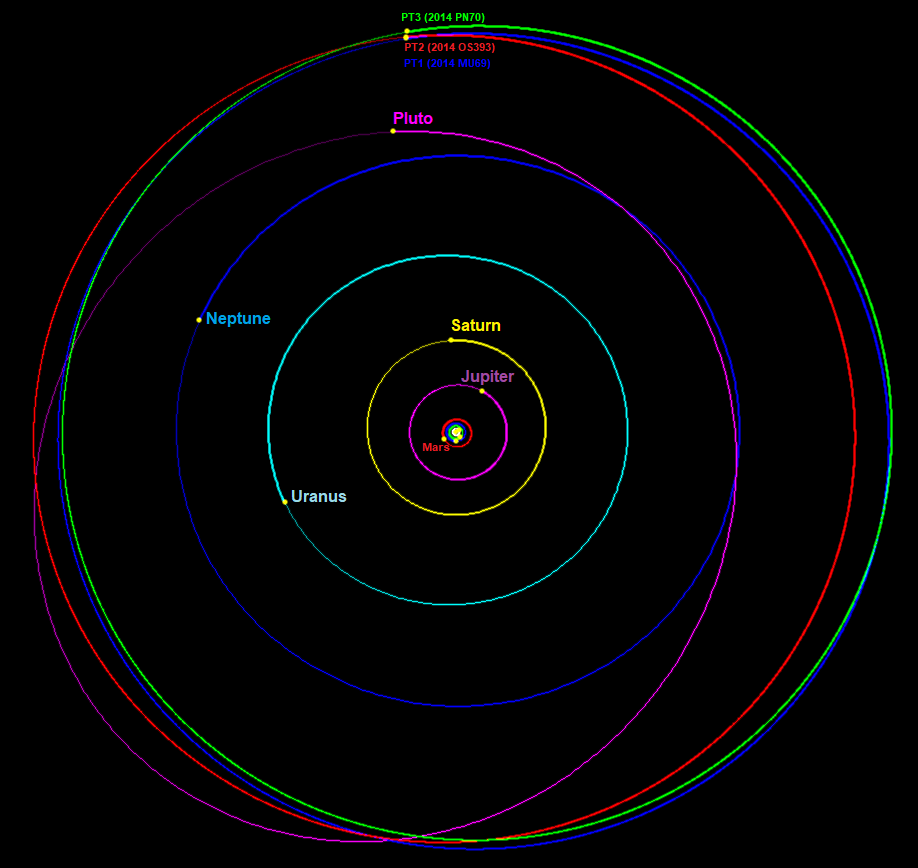
The orbits of New Horizons potential targets 1–3. 2014 OS_{393} (PT2) is in red. 486958 Arrokoth (PT1) is in blue. 2014 PN70 is in green.

2014 OS_{393} was discovered by the New Horizons Search Team with the help of the Hubble Space Telescope because the object has a magnitude of 26.3, which is too faint to be observed by ground-based telescopes. Preliminary observations by the HST searching for KBO flyby targets for the New Horizons probe started in June 2014, and more intensive observations continued in July and August. 2014 OS_{393} was first discovered in observations on July 30, 2014, but it was designated e31007AI at the time, nicknamed e3 for short. Its existence as a potential target of the New Horizons probe was revealed by NASA in October 2014 and designated PT2, but the official name 2014 OS_{393} was not assigned by the Minor Planet Center until March 2015 after better orbit information was available.

== Orbit and classification ==
2014 OS_{393} is a trans-Neptunian object and likely a non-resonant classical Kuiper belt object, also known as "cubewano". It orbits the Sun at a distance of 43.3–44.84 AU once every 292 years (semi-major axis of 44.04 AU). Its orbit has an eccentricity of 0.018 and an inclination of 3.8° with respect to the ecliptic. As this object has not been observed since July 2017, its orbit remains rather poorly determined still containing a high uncertainty of 7.

The body's observation arc begins with a precovery taken on 25 June 2014, by the New Horizons KBO Search team using the Subaru Telescope at Mauna Kea Observatory on Hawaii and ends presently on 21 July 2017, covering 1122 days.

== Binary ==
Comparison of orbital separations and diameters of trans-Neptunian close binaries

After the New Horizons probe completed its flyby of Arrokoth, the probe began observations of other nearby surrounding Kuiper belt objects, including 2014 OS_{393}. Observations of 2014 OS_{393}'s brightness variations at high phase angles allowed the New Horizons probe to make a rough determination of its rotation period as well as its shape. As New Horizons observed 2014 OS_{393} at phase angles near 90°, it displayed large variations in brightness, indicating that its shape is either extremely elongated or 2014 OS_{393} could be a binary system of two separated components. 2014 OS_{393} appeared to be possibly a separated binary in a few resolved New Horizons images, but in 2020 this remained inconclusive.

Later work by Hal Weaver in 2021 showed that 2014 OS_{393} was indeed a binary, with two components about 30 km (19 mi) in diameter, about 150 km (93 mi) apart.

== Exploration ==
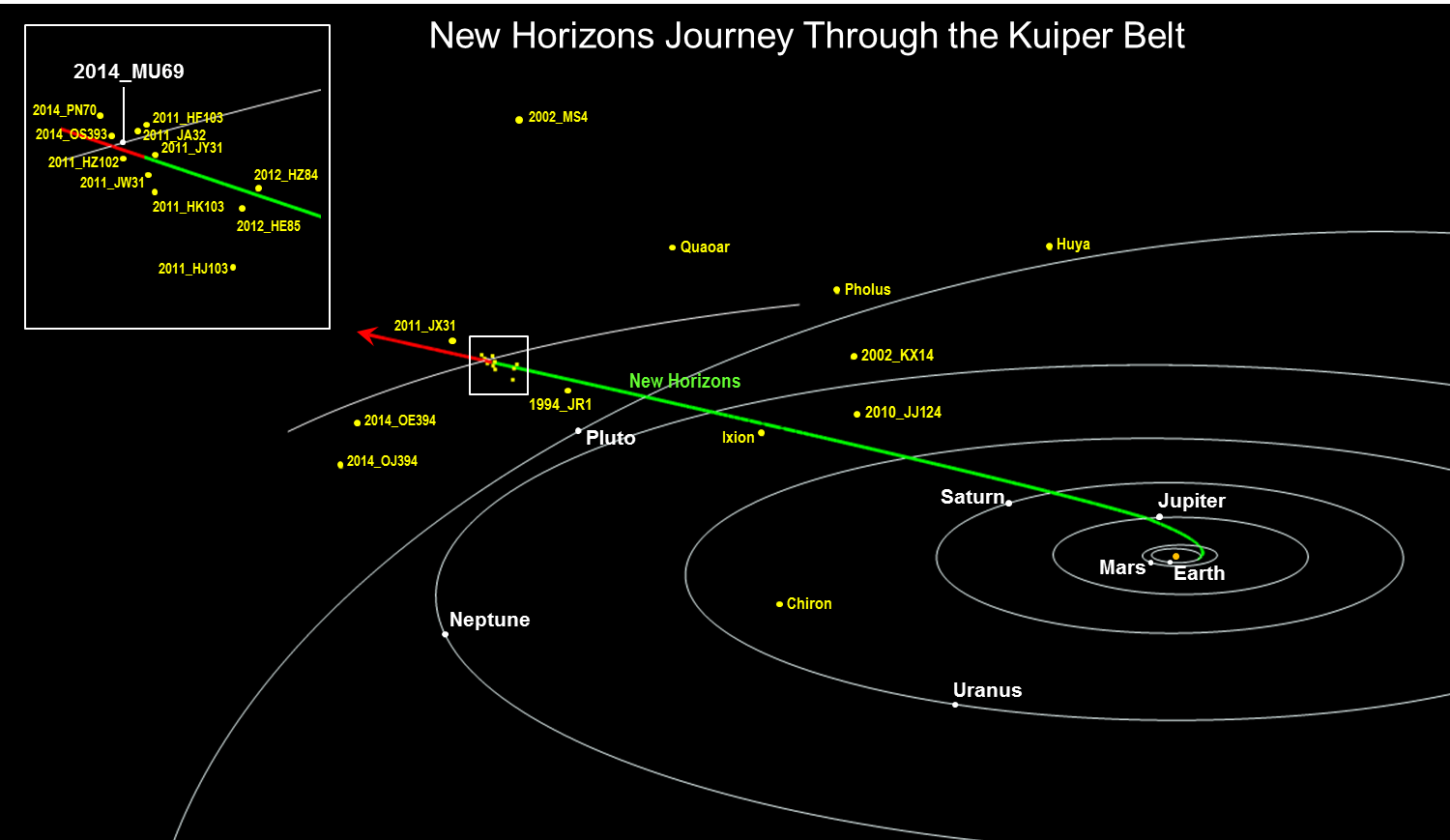
Trajectory of New Horizons and other nearby Kuiper belt objects

After the New Horizons probe completed its flyby of Pluto, the probe was to be maneuvered to a flyby of at least one Kuiper belt object. Several potential targets were under consideration for the first such flyby. 2014 OS_{393} has an estimated mean diameter between 30 and 55 kilometers, depending on the body's assumed albedo. The potential encounter in 2018–2019 would have been at a distance of 43–44 AU from the Sun.

On 28 August 2015, the New Horizons team announced the selection of 2014 MU_{69} (later named 486958 Arrokoth) as the next flyby target, eliminating the other possible targets — 2014 OS_{393}, 2014 PN70, and 2014 MT69.

The spacecraft passed 2014 OS_{393} in January 2019, at a distance of less than 0.1 AU (15 million km, 9.3 million miles). This makes 2014 OS_{393} the second closest KBO observed by New Horizons, after Arrokoth.

== Numbering and naming ==
This minor planet has not been numbered by the Minor Planet Center and remains unnamed.

== See also ==
- 2011 JY31, another tight binary KBO observed by New Horizons
- List of New Horizons topics
