= 2014 PN70 =

Trans-Neptunian object

2014 PN_{70}
- 2014 PN_{70}, imaged by the Hubble Space Telescope in May 2015

Discovery
- Discovered by: New Horizons KBO Search
- Discovery site: Hubble Space Telescope
- Discovery date: 6 August 2014 (first observed only)

Designations
- Alternative designations: g12000JZ · g1 · PT3
- Minor planet category: TNO · cubewano distant

Orbital characteristics
- Epoch 27 April 2019 (JD 2458600.5)
- Uncertainty parameter 2
- Observation arc: 0.86 yr (313 days)
- Aphelion: 47.047 AU
- Perihelion: 42.033 AU
- Semi-major axis: 44.540 AU
- Eccentricity: 0.05628
- Orbital period (sidereal): 297 yr (108,405 d)
- Mean anomaly: 288.081°
- Mean motion: 0° 0^{m} 11.937^{s} / day
- Inclination: 4.111°
- Longitude of ascending node: 136.354°
- Argument of perihelion: 228.068°

Physical characteristics
- Mean diameter: 30–55 km 35–55 km 39 km (estimate); 44 km (est. at 0.07)
- Synodic rotation period: 12.05 h
- Geometric albedo: 0.04–0.10; 0.04–0.15
- Spectral type: V–I = 1.34
- Apparent magnitude: 26.1
- Absolute magnitude (H): 10.3

2014 PN_{70}, called PT3 in the press releases surrounding the New Horizons mission, is a trans-Neptunian object from the cold classical Kuiper belt located in the outermost region of the Solar System. It measures approximately 40 kilometers (25 miles) in diameter. The object was first observed by the New Horizons Search Team using the Hubble Space Telescope on 6 August 2014, and was a proposed flyby target for the New Horizons probe until 2015, when the alternative target 486958 Arrokoth was selected.

== Discovery and designations ==
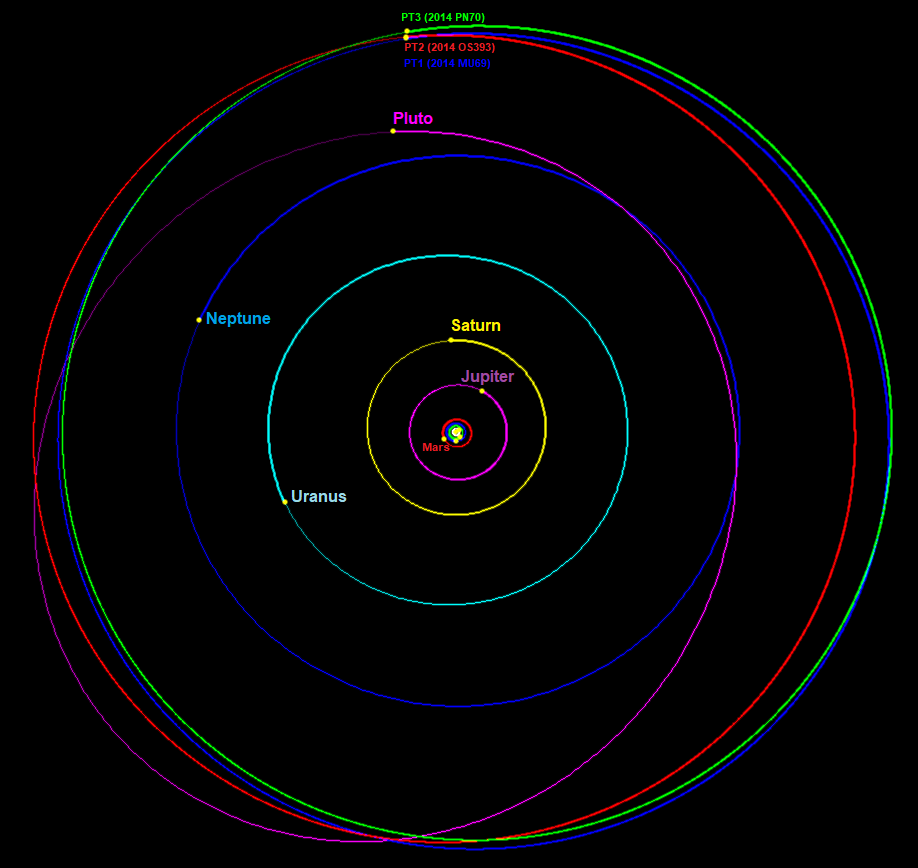
The orbits of New Horizons potential targets 1–3. 2014 PN_{70} is in green. 2014 OS393 (PT2) is in red. 486958 Arrokoth (PT1) is in blue.

2014 PN_{70} was discovered by the New Horizons Search Team during an observation campaign intended to search for KBO flyby targets for the New Horizons probe. The observations started in June 2014, and more intensive ones continued in July and August. They were conducted with the help of the Hubble Space Telescope; the object's apparent magnitude of 26.4 is too faint to be observed by ground-based telescopes. 2014 PN_{70} was first discovered in observations on August 6, 2014, and it was designated g12000JZ at the time, nicknamed g1 for short. Its existence as a potential target of the New Horizons probe was revealed by NASA in October 2014 and it was designated PT3; its official provisional designation, 2014 PN_{70}, was not assigned by the Minor Planet Center until March 2015 after better orbit information was available.

== Orbit and classification ==
2014 PN_{70} is a trans-Neptunian object. More specifically, it is a non-resonant classical Kuiper belt object, also known as "cubewano". It orbits the Sun at a distance of 42.1–46.6 AU once every 295 years and 4 months (107,886 days; semi-major axis of 44.4 AU). Its orbit has an eccentricity of 0.05 and an inclination of 4° with respect to the ecliptic. This makes it a typical member of the "cold population" among the cubewanos in the Kuiper belt.

The body's observation arc begins with a precovery taken by the New Horizons KBO Search team with the Subaru Telescope at Mauna Kea Observatory on Hawaii, six week prior to its official first observation by Hubble.

== Numbering and naming ==
This minor planet has not been numbered by the Minor Planet Center and remains unnamed.

== Physical characteristics ==
2014 PN_{70}, has a diameter approximately 35–55 km (22–34 mi), based on an estimated albedo between 0.04 and 0.10 respectively. Astronomer Marc Buie gives a similar estimate of 30–55 km (19–34 mi), and the Johnston's archive calculated a diameter of 39 km. Based on generic magnitude-to-diameter conversion, the object measures 44 km, for an absolute magnitude of 10.3 and an assumed albedo of 0.07. Hubble observations of 2014 PN_{70} show that it is very red in color.

== Exploration ==
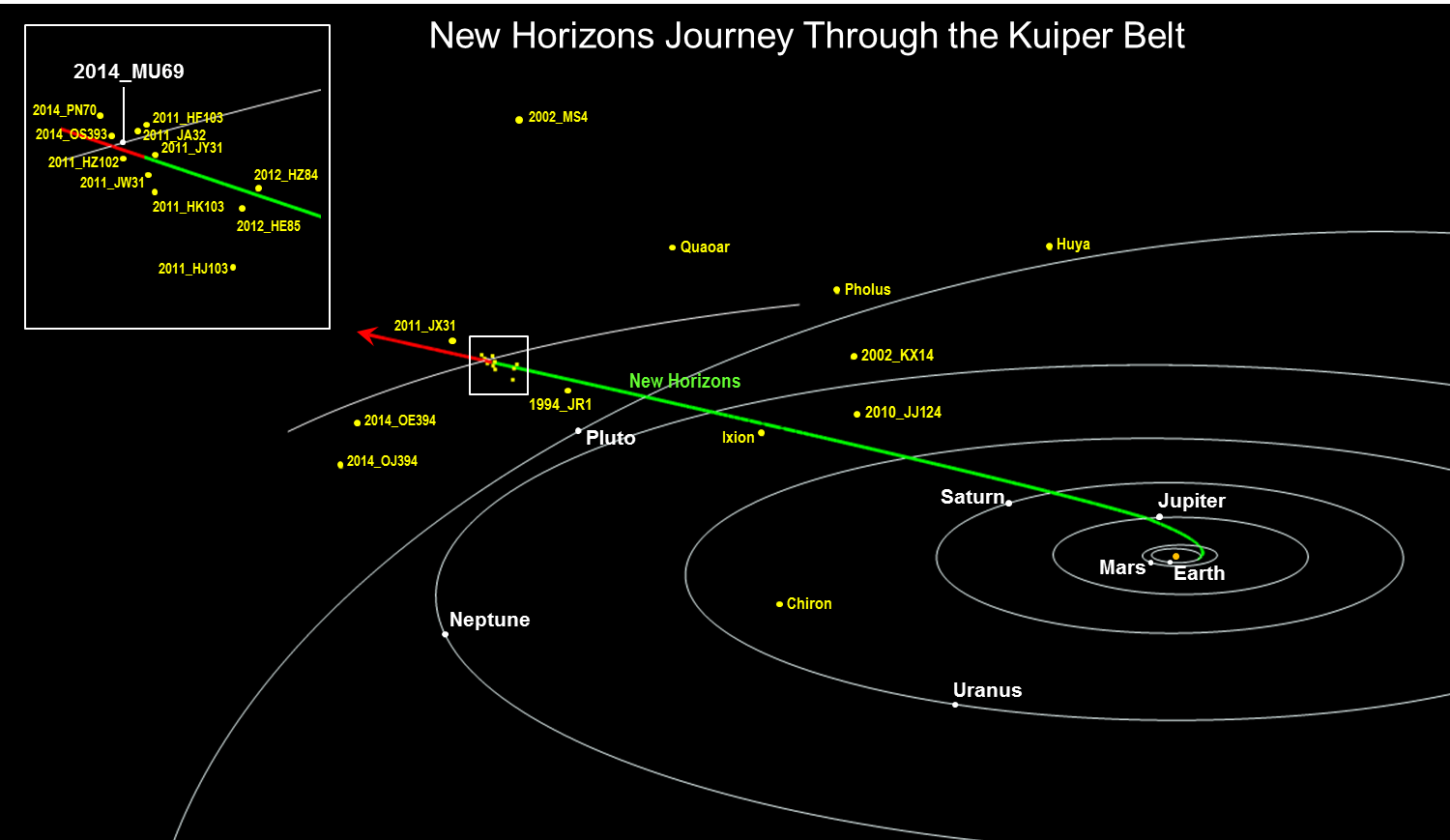
Trajectory of New Horizons and other nearby Kuiper belt objects

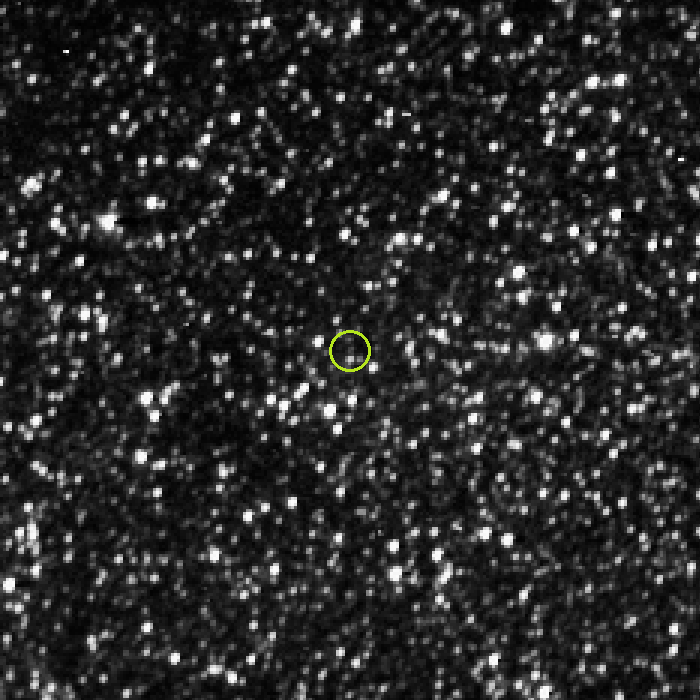
2014 PN70, imaged in January 2019 by the New Horizons space probe from a distance of 93 million km

Having completed its flyby of Pluto, the New Horizons space probe was to perform a flyby of at least one Kuiper belt object. Several potential targets were under consideration. 2014 PN_{70} (PT3) was considered a second choice after 2014 MU_{69} (PT1, later named 486958 Arrokoth), because more fuel was required to carry out a flyby. 2014 OS393 (PT2) was already no longer under consideration as a potential target. On 28 August 2015, the New Horizons team announced the selection of 2014 MU_{69} as the next flyby target.

2014 PN_{70} is one of the objects that New Horizons observed from greater distances, as part of its extended Kuiper belt mission. The spacecraft passed 2014 PN_{70} in March 2019, at a distance of approximately 0.1 AU (15 million km; 9.3 million mi). This made 2014 PN_{70} the third closest KBO observed by New Horizons, after Arrokoth and 2014 OS_{393}. New Horizons made its first observations of 2014 PN_{70} on 5 January 2019, from a distance of 92.7 million km.

New Horizons did not come close enough to resolve either 2014 PN_{70} or 2014 OS_{393}, but the observations should be sufficient to determine the rotation periods and surface properties of these objects and to search for possible satellites. The distant KBO observations provide an important context for the data collected during the close flyby of Arrokoth.

== See also ==
- List of New Horizons topics
