= Moons of Saturn =

Natural satellites of the planet Saturn

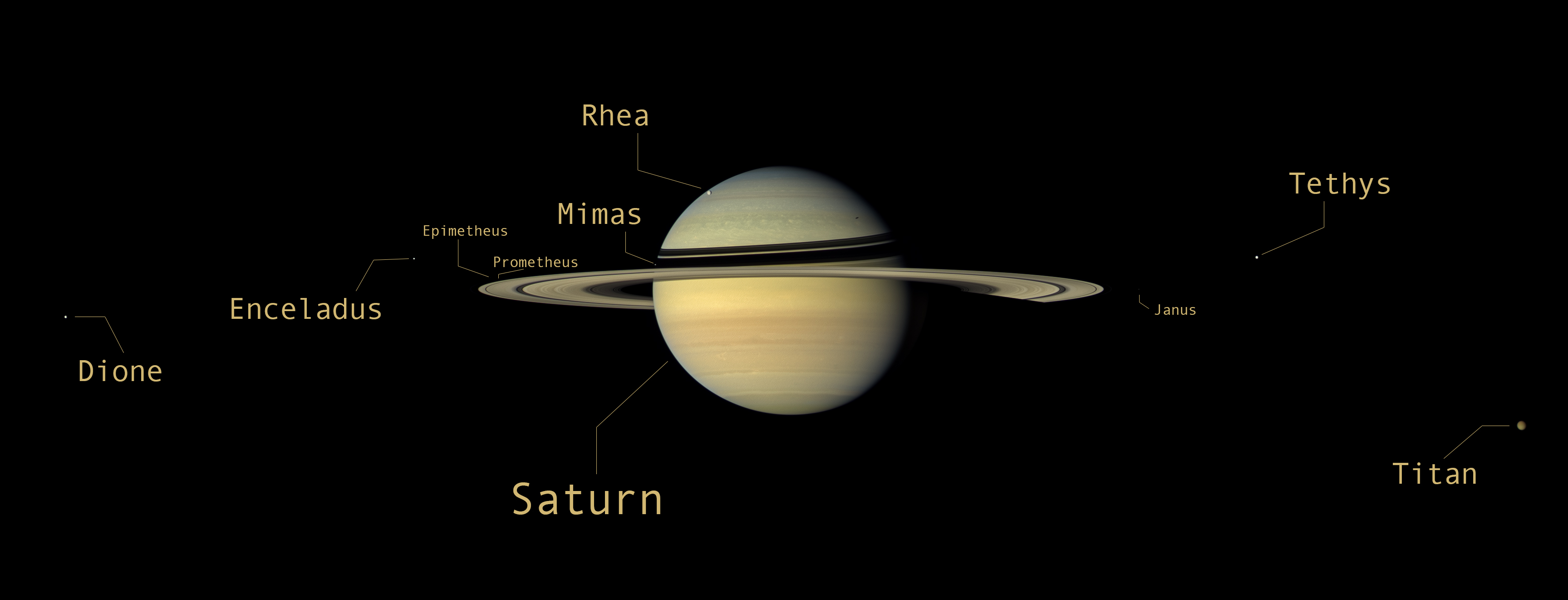
An annotated picture of Saturn's many moons captured by the Cassini spacecraft. Shown in the image are Dione, Enceladus, Epimetheus, Prometheus, Mimas, Rhea, Janus, Tethys and Titan.

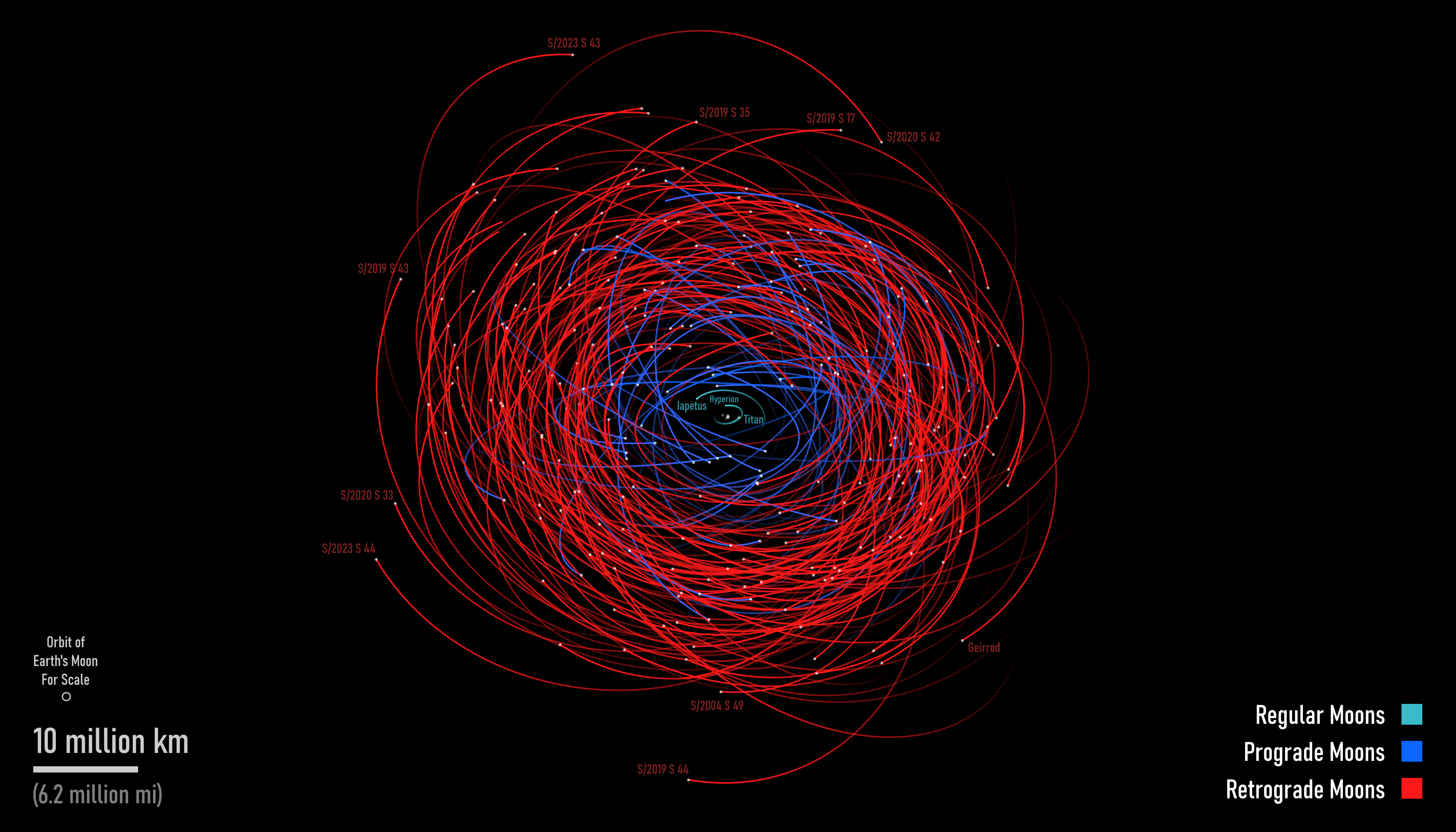
Diagram showing the highly clustered orbits of Saturn's 250 known outer irregular moons as of 2025. The majority of these irregular moons orbit retrograde, or opposite to the direction of Saturn's rotation. The orbits of retrograde moons are colored red while the orbits of prograde moons are colored blue.

Saturn has 293 moons with confirmed orbits as of June 2026, the most of any planet in the Solar System, more than every other planets' moons combined. Saturn's moons are diverse in size, ranging from tiny moonlets to Titan, which is larger than the planet Mercury and the second largest moon in the Solar System. Three of these moons possess particularly notable features: Titan has a nitrogen-rich atmosphere and a landscape featuring river networks and hydrocarbon lakes; Enceladus emits jets of ice from its south-polar region and is covered in a deep layer of snow; and Iapetus has contrasting black and white hemispheres as well as an extensive ridge of equatorial mountains which are among the tallest in the Solar System.

Twenty-five of the confirmed moons are regular satellites; they have prograde orbits not greatly inclined to Saturn's equatorial plane (except Iapetus, which has a prograde but significantly inclined orbit). They include the seven rounded satellites, and four small moons that exist in a trojan orbit with some of the large moons. Four orbit inside of the diffuse G ring or between the major moons Mimas and Enceladus. Two moons are mutually co-orbital, Janus and Epimetheus. The relatively large Hyperion is locked in an orbital resonance with Titan. The remaining regular moons orbit near the edges of or within gaps in the main rings, some of which act as shepherd moons of the dense A Ring and the narrow F Ring. The regular satellites are traditionally named after Titans and Titanesses or other figures associated with the mythological Saturn, and two, S/2009 S 1 and S/2009 S 2, remain unnamed.

The remaining 268 moons, with mean diameters ranging from 2 to 213 km (1 to 132 mi), orbit much farther from Saturn. They are irregular satellites, which have high orbital inclinations and eccentricities mixed between prograde and retrograde. These moons are probably captured minor planets, or fragments from the collisional breakup of such bodies after they were captured, creating collisional families. The irregular satellites are classified by their orbital characteristics into the prograde Inuit and Gallic groups and the large retrograde Norse group, and their names are chosen from the corresponding mythologies (with the Gallic group corresponding to Celtic mythology). Phoebe, the largest irregular Saturnian moon, is the sole exception to this naming system; it is part of the Norse group but named for a Greek Titaness. As of April 2026, 228 of Saturn's irregular moons are unnamed.

The rings of Saturn are made of objects ranging in size from microscopic to moonlets hundreds of meters across, each in its own orbit around Saturn. The number of moons given above does not include these moonlets, nor hundreds of possible kilometer-sized distant moons that have been observed on single occasions. Thus an absolute number of Saturnian moons cannot be given, because there is no consensus on a boundary between the countless small unnamed objects that form Saturn's ring system and the larger objects that have been named as moons. Over 150 moonlets embedded in the rings have been detected by the disturbance they create in the surrounding ring material, though this is thought to be only a small sample of the total population of such objects.

== Discovery ==
=== Early observations ===
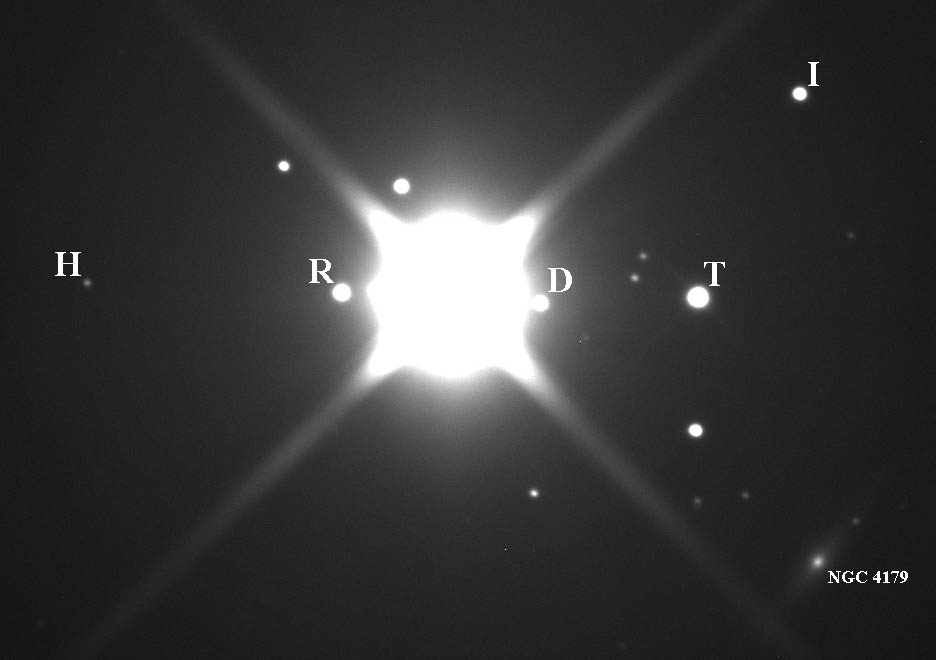
Saturn (overexposed) and the moons Iapetus, Titan, Dione, Hyperion, and Rhea viewed through a 12.5-inch telescope

Before the advent of telescopic photography, eight moons of Saturn were discovered by direct observation using optical telescopes. Saturn's largest moon, Titan, was discovered in 1655 by Christiaan Huygens using a 57-millimeter (2.2 in) objective lens on a refracting telescope of his own design. Tethys, Dione, Rhea and Iapetus (the "Sidera Lodoicea") were discovered between 1671 and 1684 by Giovanni Domenico Cassini. Mimas and Enceladus were discovered in 1789 by William Herschel. Hyperion was discovered in 1848 by W. C. Bond, G. P. Bond and William Lassell.

The use of long-exposure photographic plates made possible the discovery of additional moons. The first to be discovered in this manner, Phoebe, was found in 1899 by W. H. Pickering. In 1966 the tenth satellite of Saturn was discovered by Audouin Dollfus, when the rings were observed edge-on near an equinox. It was later named Janus. A few years later it was realized that all observations of 1966 could only be explained if another satellite had been present and that it had an orbit similar to that of Janus. This object is now known as Epimetheus, the eleventh moon of Saturn. It shares the same orbit with Janus—the only known example of co-orbitals in the Solar System. In 1980, three additional Saturnian moons were discovered from the ground and later confirmed by the Voyager probes. They are trojan moons of Dione (Helene) and Tethys (Telesto and Calypso).

=== Observations by spacecraft ===
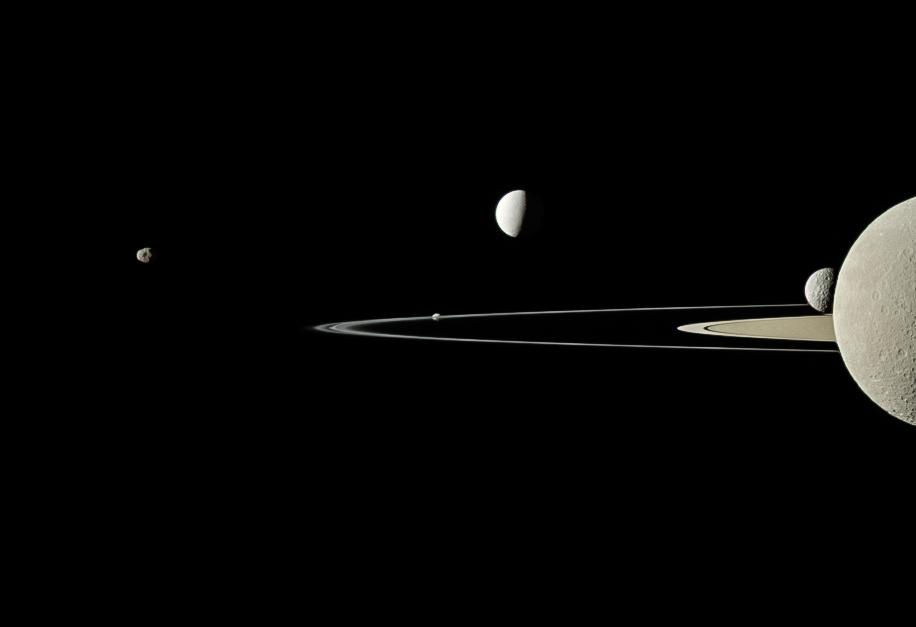
Five moons in a Cassini image: Rhea bisected in the far-right foreground, Mimas behind it, bright Enceladus above and beyond the rings, Pandora eclipsed by the F Ring, and Janus off to the left

The study of the outer planets has since been revolutionized by the use of uncrewed space probes. The arrival of the Voyager spacecraft at Saturn in 1980–1981 resulted in the discovery of three additional moons—Atlas, Prometheus and Pandora—bringing the total to 17. In addition, Epimetheus was confirmed as distinct from Janus. In 1990, Pan was discovered in archival Voyager images.

The Cassini mission, which arrived at Saturn in July 2004, initially discovered three small inner moons: Methone and Pallene between Mimas and Enceladus, and the second trojan moon of Dione, Polydeuces. It also observed three suspected but unconfirmed moons in the F Ring. In November 2004 Cassini scientists announced that the structure of Saturn's rings indicates the presence of several more moons orbiting within the rings, although only one, Daphnis, had been visually confirmed at the time. In 2007 Anthe was announced. In 2008 it was reported that Cassini observations of a depletion of energetic electrons in Saturn's magnetosphere near Rhea might be the signature of a tenuous ring system around Saturn's second largest moon. In March 2009, Aegaeon, a moonlet within the G Ring, was announced. In July of the same year, S/2009 S 1, the first moonlet within the B Ring, was observed. Cassini also observed another B ring moonlet, S/2009 S 2, though it was reported much later in June 2026. In April 2014, the possible beginning of a new moon, within the A Ring, was reported. (related image)

=== Search for irregulars ===
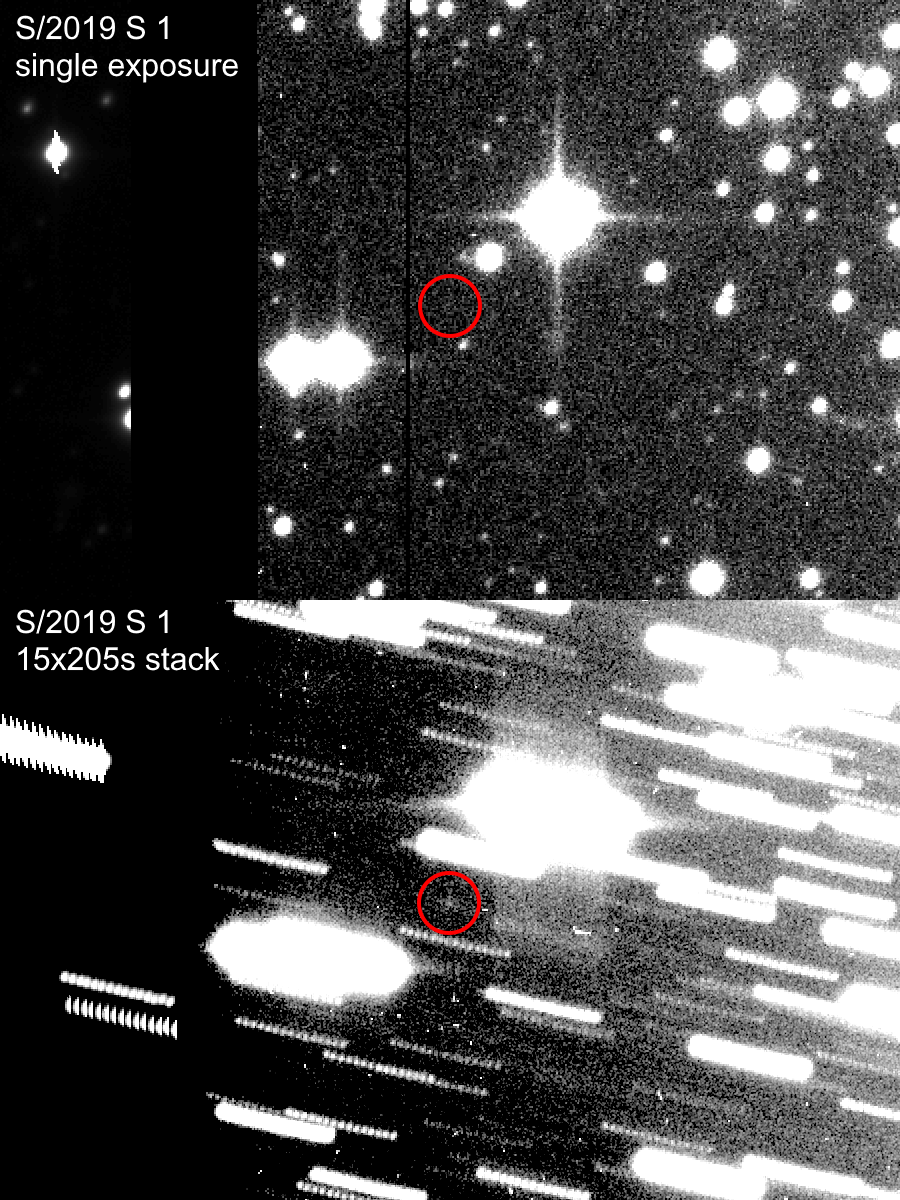
This image demonstrates the application of the shift-and-add technique to the detection of a faint moon of Saturn (S/2019 S 1; circled in red). While the moon is barely visible in an individual image (top panel), it can be seen better when many images of the moon are taken, stacked to the moon's motion and then added together (bottom panel)

Study of Saturn's moons has also been aided by advances in telescope instrumentation, primarily the introduction of digital charge-coupled devices which replaced photographic plates. For the 20th century, Phoebe stood alone among Saturn's known moons with its highly irregular orbit. Then in 2000, a team of astronomers led by Brett J. Gladman discovered twelve irregular moons of Saturn using various ground-based telescopes around the world. The discovery of these irregular moons revealed orbital groupings within Saturn's irregular moon population, which provided the first insights into the collisional history of Saturn's irregular moons.

In 2003, a team of astronomers including Scott Sheppard, David C. Jewitt, and Jan Kleyna began using the Subaru 8.2 m telescope at Mauna Kea Observatory to search for irregular moons around Saturn, and discovered Narvi. Because of the Subaru telescope's very large aperture size alongside its camera's large field of view, it is capable of detecting extremely faint moons, hence Sheppard's team continued using the Subaru telescope for further moon searches. In 2005, Sheppard's team announced the discovery of twelve more small outer moons from their Subaru observations. Sheppard's team announced nine more irregular moons in 2006 and three more moons in 2007, when Tarqeq was announced in April 2007, followed by S/2007 S 2 and S/2007 S 3 the following month.

No new irregular moons of Saturn were reported until 2019, when Sheppard's team identified twenty more irregular satellites of Saturn in archives of their 2004–2007 Subaru observations. This brought Saturn's moon count to 82, which resulted in Saturn overtaking Jupiter as the planet with the most known moons for the first time since 2000. In 2019, researchers Edward Ashton, Brett Gladman, and Matthew Beaudoin conducted a survey of Saturn's Hill sphere using the 3.6-meter Canada–France–Hawaii Telescope (CFHT) and discovered about 80 new Saturnian irregular moons, which were reported to the Minor Planet Center (MPC) for announcement. Follow-up observations of these new moons took place over 2019–2021, eventually leading to S/2019 S 1 being announced in November 2021 and an additional 62 moons being announced from 3–16 May 2023. These discoveries brought Saturn's total number of confirmed moons up to 145, making it the first planet known to have over 100 moons. Yet another moon, S/2006 S 20, was announced on 23 May 2023, bringing Saturn's total count moons to 146. On 11 March 2025, 128 moons of Saturn were simultaneously announced by the MPC, bringing the total number of confirmed moons to 274. These moons were found by Ashton, Gladman, Mike Alexandersen, and Jean-Marc Petit, using the CFHT in 2023, as a continuation of their survey. Ashton's team also searched in CFHT images taken by a separate team consisting of Wesley Fraser, Samantha Lawler, and John Kavelaars. Many of these moons were traced back to earlier observations from 2004 to 2021, which correspond to their discovery dates. In 2026, Saturn's total moon count increased to 293 after eleven irregular moons were announced on 16 March, seven irregular moons on 9 April, and one regular moon on 17 June.

All of these recently announced moons are small and faint, with diameters over 3 km (2 mi) and apparent magnitudes of 25–27. These extremely dim moons could only be seen via the shift-and-add technique, where multiple long-exposure images are overlaid, shifted to follow the motion of Saturn in the sky, and then additively combined to bring out the signal of faint moons that follow Saturn in the sky. The researchers found that the Saturnian irregular moon population is more abundant at smaller sizes, suggesting that they are likely fragments from a collision that occurred a few hundred million years ago. The researchers extrapolated that the true population of Saturnian irregular moons larger than 2.8 km (1.7 mi) in diameter amounts to 150±30, which is approximately three times as many Jovian irregular moons down to the same size. If this size distribution applies to even smaller diameters, Saturn would therefore intrinsically have more irregular moons than Jupiter.

== Naming ==
The modern names for Saturnian moons were suggested by John Herschel in 1847. He proposed to name them after mythological figures associated with the Roman god of agriculture and harvest, Saturn (equated to the Greek Cronus). In particular, the then known seven satellites were named after Titans, Titanesses and Giants – brothers and sisters of Cronus. The idea was similar to Simon Marius' scheme for naming moons of Jupiter after children of Zeus.

As Saturn devoured his children, his family could not be assembled around him, so that the choice lay among his brothers and sisters, the Titans and Titanesses. The name Iapetus seemed indicated by the obscurity and remoteness of the exterior satellite, Titan by the superior size of the Huyghenian, while the three female appellations [Rhea, Dione, and Tethys] class together the three intermediate Cassinian satellites. The minute interior ones seemed appropriately characterized by a return to male appellations [Enceladus and Mimas] chosen from a younger and inferior (though still superhuman) brood. [Results of the Astronomical Observations made ... at the Cape of Good Hope, p. 415]

In 1848, Lassell proposed that the eighth satellite of Saturn be named Hyperion after another Titan. When in the 20th century the names of Titans were exhausted, the moons were named after different characters of the Greco-Roman mythology or giants from other mythologies. All the irregular moons (except Phoebe, discovered about a century before the others) are named after Inuit, and Gallic gods, and after Norse ice giants. The International Astronomical Union's (IAU) Committee for Planetary System Nomenclature, which oversees the naming of Solar System moons, rules that Saturnian moons that are smaller than 3 km in diameter (absolute magnitude H_{V} > 16.5) (Note: If assuming an albedo of 0.04, H_{V} = 16.5 corresponds to a diameter of 3.3 km. The formula for the calculation can be found in absolute magnitude#Small Solar System bodies (H).) should only be named if they are of scientific interest.

Some asteroids share the same names as moons of Saturn: 55 Pandora, 106 Dione, 577 Rhea, 1809 Prometheus, 1810 Epimetheus, and 4450 Pan. In addition, three more asteroids would share the names of Saturnian moons if not for spelling differences made permanent by the IAU: Calypso and asteroid 53 Kalypso; Helene and asteroid 101 Helena; and Gunnlod and asteroid 657 Gunlöd.

== Formation ==
There are three main scenarios proposed to explain how the regular moons of Saturn formed. The first scenario proposes that they are remnants of the debris of a giant impact or the disruption of a previous moon system. It is thought that the Saturnian system of Titan, mid-sized moons, and rings developed from a set-up closer to the Galilean moons of Jupiter, though the details are unclear. It has been proposed either that a second Titan-sized moon broke up, producing the rings and inner mid-sized moons, or that two large moons fused to form Titan, with the collision scattering icy debris that formed the mid-sized moons. Studies based on Enceladus's tidal-based geologic activity and the lack of evidence of extensive past resonances in Tethys, Dione, and Rhea's orbits suggest that the moons up to and including Rhea may be only 100 million years old.

Another more generic theory proposes that they that formed directly from the original circumplanetary disk around Saturn. The gas giants, Jupiter and Saturn, are expected to have had circumplanetary disks, while this is considered unlikely for the ice giants Uranus and Neptune. The moons may have originated from the higher-density regions within the disk, and the mass of the system may be a reflection of the mass of the disk. Alternatively, several sets of moons may have formed then fallen out of their orbits due to drag with the disk, leading to the survival of only one large moon (Titan).

The third idea is that moons coalesced from a previously much more massive set of rings. This would explain the existence of the small regular moons and the mid-sized moons interior to Titan. The ring system would have spread outward over time, some of it beyond the Roche limit of Saturn, allowing that material to accrete into moons. The moons would continue migrating outwards due to gravitation interactions with the rings but slow down the further away they move, leading to them colliding and merging. This means that moons farther away are older and tend to be more massive. This model does not address the origin of the ring system itself.

== Mass distribution ==
Saturn's satellite system is very lopsided: the largest moon, Titan, comprises 96% of the mass in orbit around the planet. The six other planemo (ellipsoidal) moons constitute 4% of the mass. These seven moons are large enough to have collapsed into a relaxed, ellipsoidal shape, though only one or two, Titan and possibly Rhea, are currently in hydrostatic equilibrium. The remaining small moons, together with the rings, comprise only 0.04% of the orbiting mass. (Note: The mass of the rings is about 0.40 times the mass of Mimas, whereas the combined mass of Janus, Hyperion and Phoebe—the most massive of the remaining moons—is about one-third. The total mass of the rings and small moons is around 5.5×10^{19} kg.)

1. Mimas 0.04
2. Enceladus 0.11
3. Tethys 0.62
4. Dione 1.1
5. Rhea 2.3
6. Titan 134.5
7. Iapetus 1.8
1. Mimas 0.04
2. Enceladus 0.11
3. Tethys 0.62
4. Dione 1.1
5. Rhea 2.3
6. [Titan omitted] 0
7. Iapetus 1.8
The relative masses of Saturn's moons. Values are ×10^{21} kg. With Titan in the comparison (left), Mimas and Enceladus are invisible at this scale. Even excluding Titan (right), Phoebe, Hyperion, the smaller moons and the rings are invisible.

Saturn's major satellites, compared with the Moon
Name	Diameter (km)	Mass (kg)	Orbital radius (km)	Orbital period (days)
Mimas	396 (0.12 D_{☾})	4×10^{19} (0.0005 M_{☾})	185,539 (0.48 a_{☾})	0.9 (0.03 T_{☾})
Enceladus	504 (0.14 D_{☾})	1.1×10^{20} (0.002 M_{☾})	237,948 (0.62 a_{☾})	1.4 (0.05 T_{☾})
Tethys	1,062 (0.30 D_{☾})	6.2×10^{20} (0.008 M_{☾})	294,619 (0.77 a_{☾})	1.9 (0.07 T_{☾})
Dione	1,123 (0.32 D_{☾})	1.1×10^{21} (0.015 M_{☾})	377,396 (0.98 a_{☾})	2.7 (0.10 T_{☾})
Rhea	1,527 (0.44 D_{☾})	2.3×10^{21} (0.03 M_{☾})	527,108 (1.37 a_{☾})	4.5 (0.20 T_{☾})
Titan	5,149 (1.48 D_{☾}) (0.75 D_{♂})	1.35×10^{23} (1.80 M_{☾}) (0.21 M_{♂})	1,221,870 (3.18 a_{☾})	16 (0.60 T_{☾})
Iapetus	1,470 (0.42 D_{☾})	1.8×10^{21} (0.025 M_{☾})	3,560,820 (9.26 a_{☾})	79 (2.90 T_{☾})

== Characteristics and groups ==
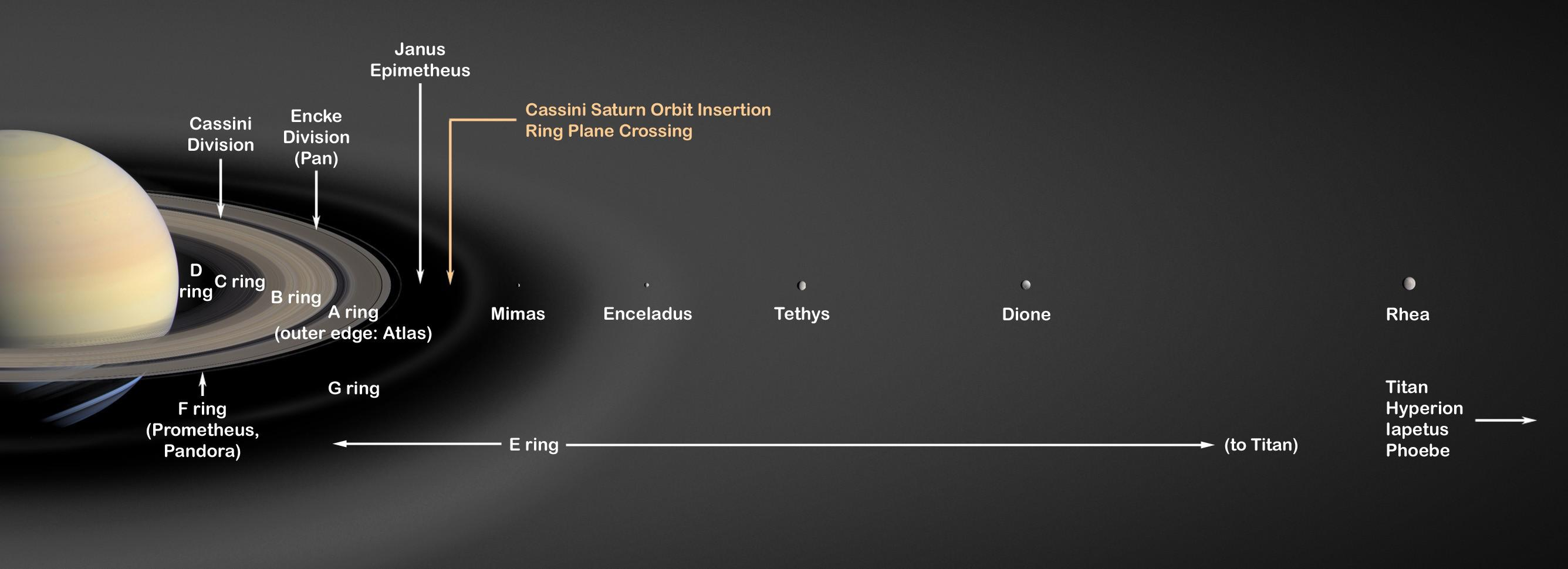
Artist conception of Saturn, its rings and major icy moons—from Mimas to Rhea

Although the boundaries may be somewhat vague, Saturn's moons can be divided into several groups according to their orbital characteristics. Many of them, such as Pan and Daphnis, orbit within Saturn's ring system and have orbital periods only slightly longer than the planet's rotation period. The innermost moons and most regular satellites all have mean orbital inclinations ranging from less than a degree to about 1.5 degrees (except Iapetus, which has an inclination of 7.57 degrees) and small orbital eccentricities. Some of the small inner moons are shepherd satellites, which have the effect of sculpting the rings: giving them sharp edges, and creating gaps between them. On the other hand, irregular satellites in the outermost regions of Saturn's moon system, in particular the Norse group, have orbital radii of millions of kilometers and orbital periods lasting several years. The moons of the Norse group also orbit in the opposite direction to Saturn's rotation.

=== Inner moons ===
==== Inner ring moons ====
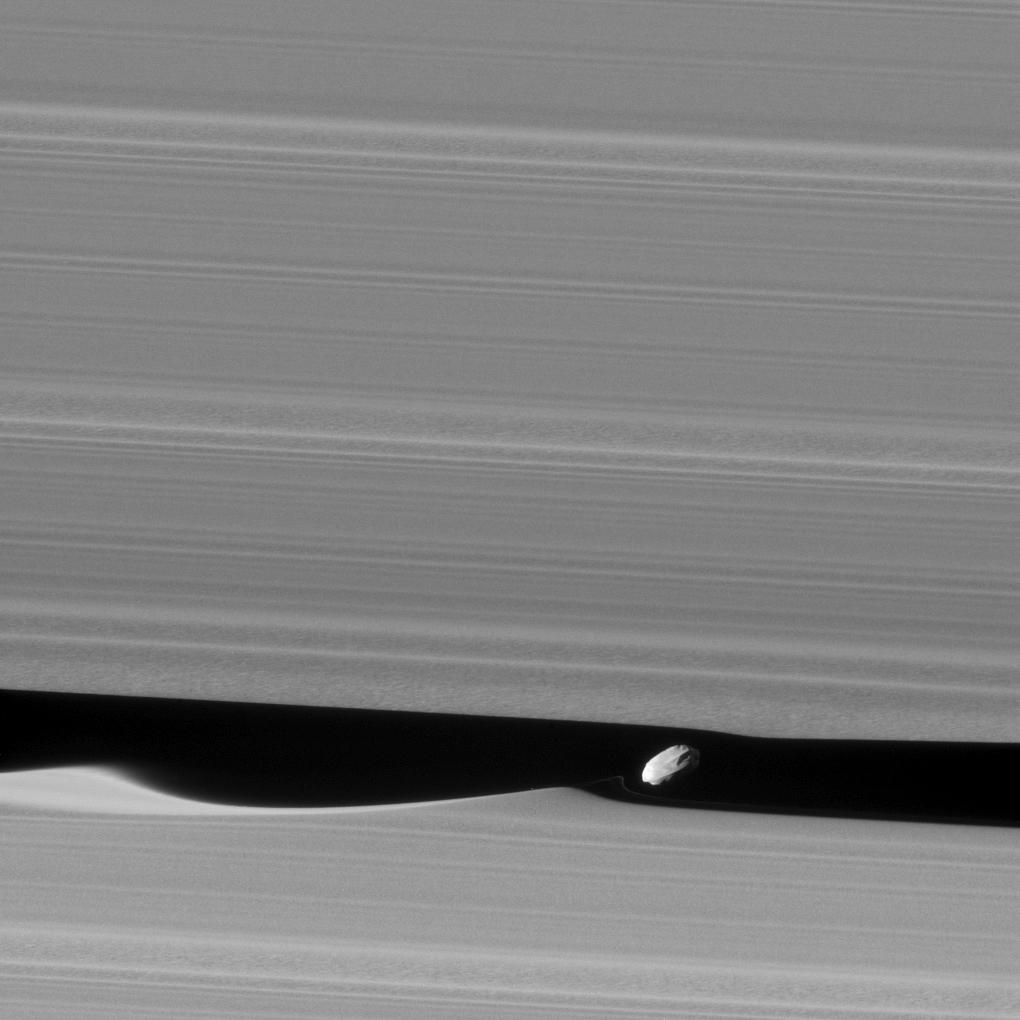
Shepherd moon Daphnis creating waves in Saturn's A Ring

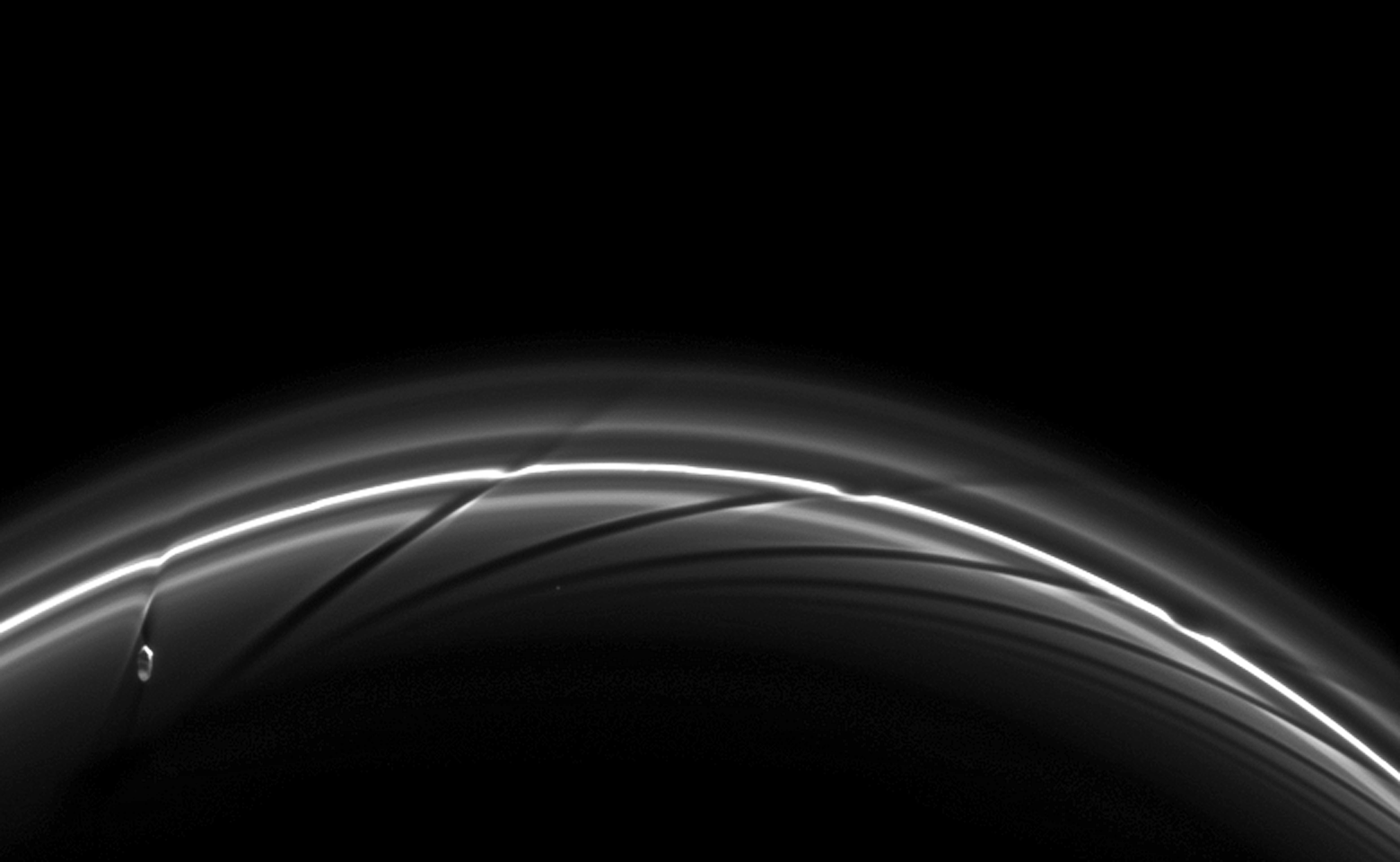
Shepherd moon Prometheus disturbing Saturn's F Ring

These satellites orbit the closest to Saturn, occupying spaces between the gaps or on the edges of the main rings. Several act as shepherd moons, and they are Pan (Encke gap), Daphnis (Keeler gap), and Prometheus (F Ring). Atlas and Pandora orbit on the outside edge of the A Ring and F Ring respectively, and were long thought to be shepherds as well, until more recent studies began to indicate otherwise. These moons likely formed as a result of accretion of the friable ring material on preexisting denser cores. The cores with sizes from one-third to one-half the present-day moons may be themselves collisional shards formed when a parental satellite of the rings disintegrated.

==== Co-orbitals ====
Janus and Epimetheus are co-orbital moons. They are of similar size, with Janus being somewhat larger than Epimetheus. They have orbits with less than a 100-kilometer difference in semi-major axis, close enough that they would collide if they attempted to pass each other. Instead of colliding, their gravitational interaction causes them to swap orbits every four years. Both moons additionally act as shepherds for the A Ring.

==== Ring-embedded moons ====
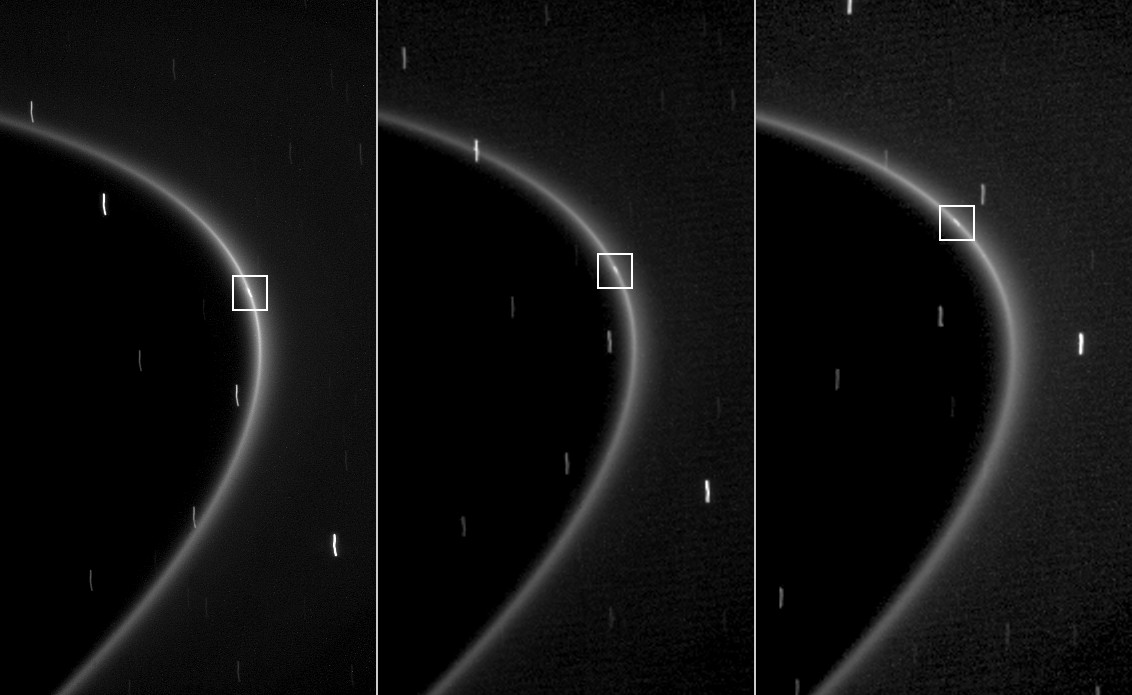
Sequence of Cassini images of Aegaeon embedded within the bright arc of Saturn's G Ring

These four moons' orbits are embedded within their own faint rings or partial arcs, and serve as sources of material within their respective ring structures. They are some of the smallest moons in the Saturnian system. Aegaeon resides within the bright arc of G Ring, while the other three moons, Methone, Anthe, and Pallene, orbit between the major moons Mimas and Enceladus. The latter three are sometimes collectively referred to as the Alkyonides, named after those of Greek mythology.

Aegaeon is trapped in the 7:6 mean-motion resonance with Mimas, meaning that it makes exactly seven revolutions around Saturn while Mimas makes exactly six. The moon is the largest among the population of bodies that are sources of dust in the G ring. Aegaeon, Anthe, and Methone are involved in orbital resonances, resulting in ring arcs along their orbits. Ejecta from their surfaces remains locked in the same resonance as the moon is, shaping into an arc instead of a uniform ring. In contrast, Pallene, which is not in resonance, possesses a faint, complete ring.

Imagery shows that Aegaeon, Methone, and Pallene are much darker than expected, possibly due to exposure to high-energy radiation. Methone and Pallene are the only moons that have been imaged in any detail, revealing them to be morphologically different from any small moon, asteroid, or comet imaged previously. Of the two, only Methone has been imaged from close range, showing it to be egg-shaped with very few or no craters.

==== Trojans ====
Trojan moons are a unique feature only known from the Saturnian system. A trojan body orbits at either the leading L_{4} or trailing L_{5} Lagrange point of a much larger object, such as a large moon or planet. Tethys has two trojan moons, Telesto (leading) and Calypso (trailing), and Dione also has two, Helene (leading) and Polydeuces (trailing). Helene is the largest trojan moon, while Polydeuces is by far the smallest and has the most chaotic orbit. These moons are coated with dusty material that has smoothed out their surfaces.

=== Major moons ===
Saturn's major moons

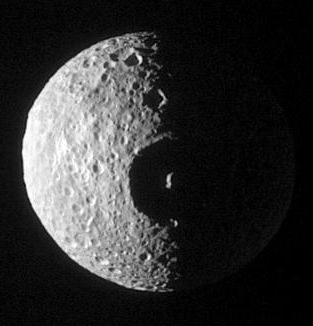
Image of Mimas from Cassini. The large crater Herschel is visible.

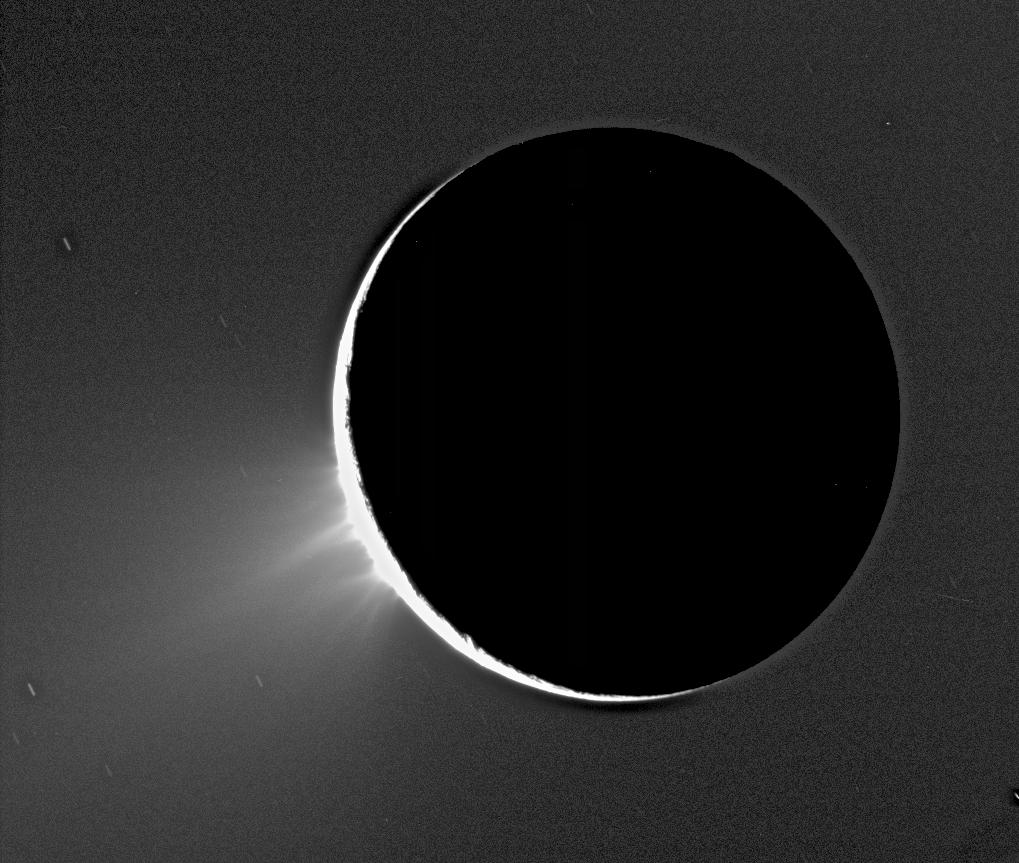
Enceladus ejecting icy particles from its south polar plumes

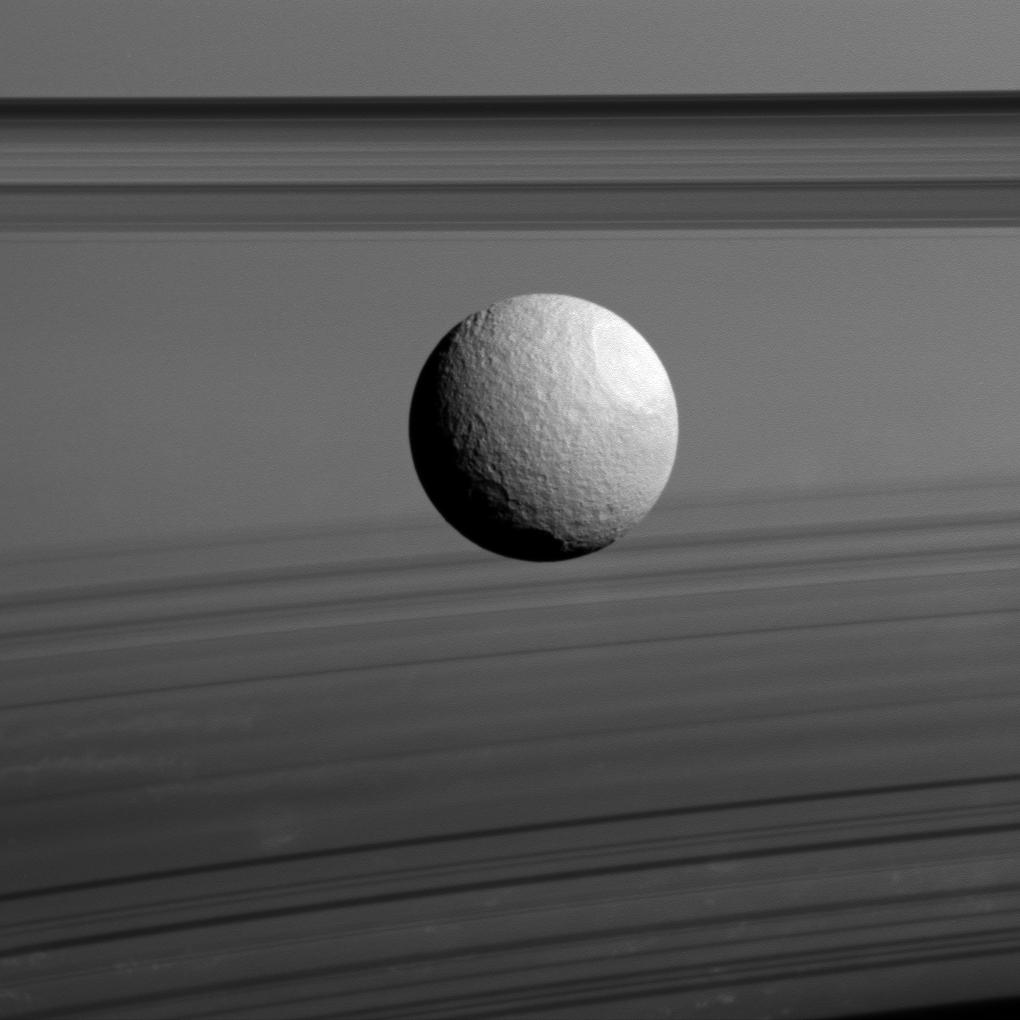
Tethys and the rings of Saturn

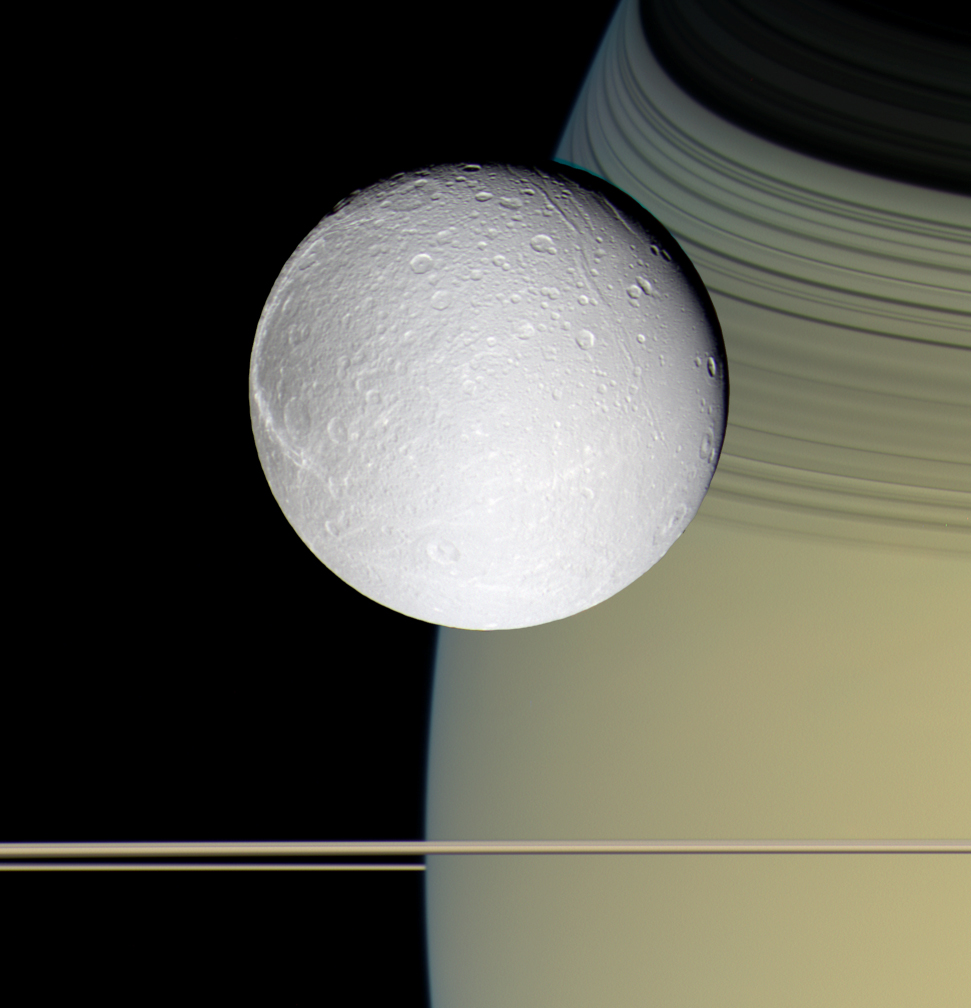
Color view of Dione in front of Saturn

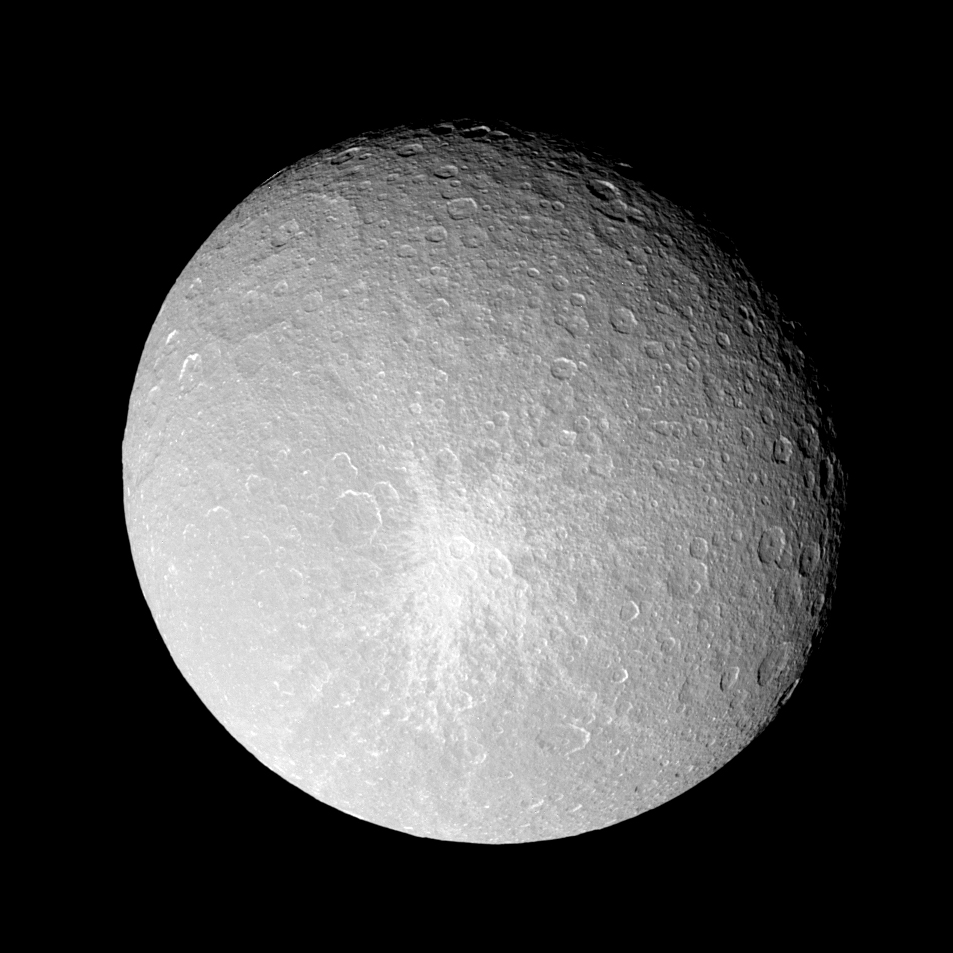
Inktomi or "The Splat", a relatively young crater with prominent butterfly-shaped ejecta on Rhea's leading hemisphere

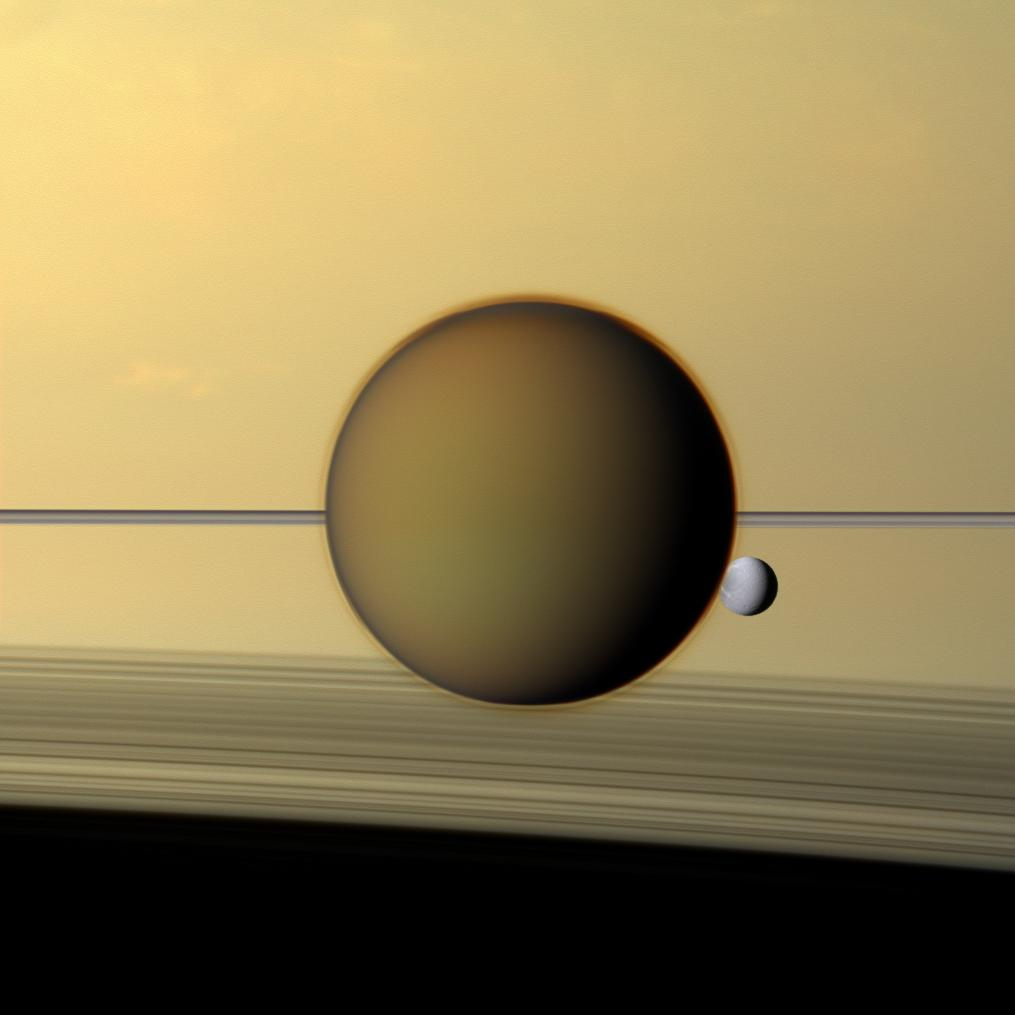
Titan in front of Dione and the rings of Saturn

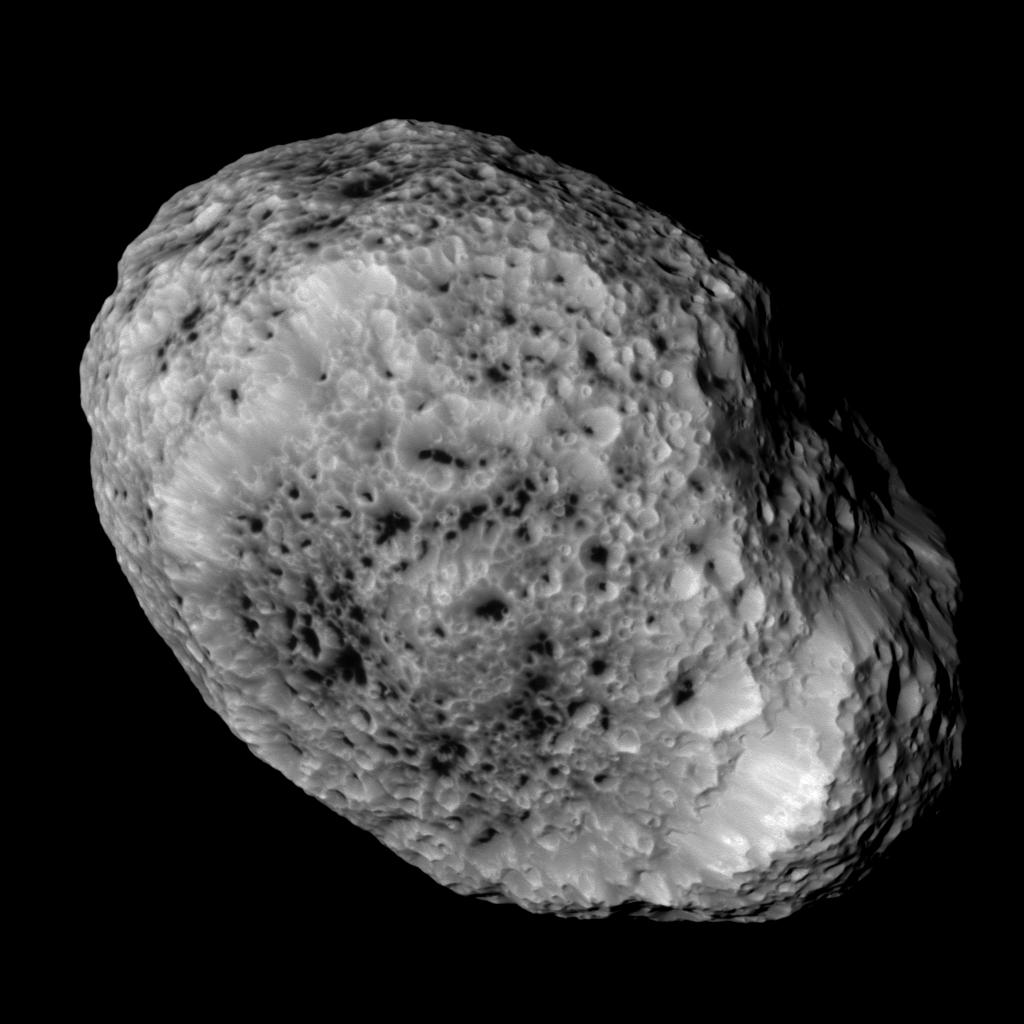
Cassini image of Hyperion

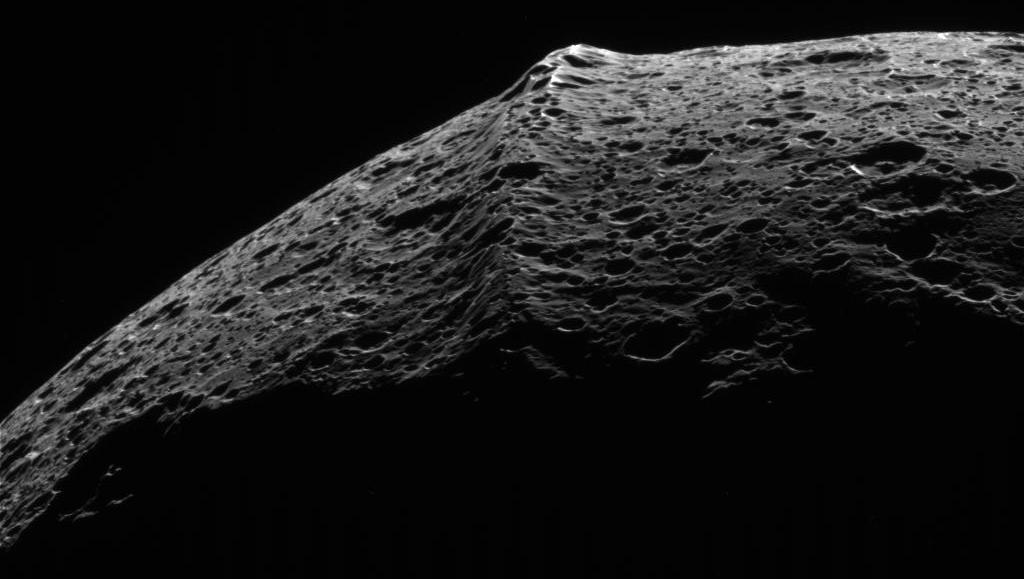
Equatorial ridge on Iapetus

In the Saturnian system, there are seven moons large enough to be ellipsoidal, though Hyperion is often taken with them to make eight major moons. Sometimes Phoebe is included as well, though usually it is placed with the irregular satellites (see below). The moons inward of Titan orbit within Saturn's tenuous E Ring. The three smaller moons of the Alkyonides group and the trojan moons orbit with the innermost four moons.

- Mimas is the smallest and least massive of the round moons, although its mass is sufficient to alter the orbit of Methone. It is noticeably ovoid-shaped, having been made shorter at the poles and longer at the equator (by about 20 km) by the effects of Saturn's gravity. Mimas has a large impact crater one-third its diameter, Herschel, situated on its leading hemisphere. Mimas has no known past or present geologic activity and its surface is dominated by impact craters, though it does have a water ocean 20–30 km beneath the surface. The only tectonic features known are a few arcuate and linear troughs, which probably formed when Mimas was shattered by the Herschel impact.
- Enceladus is one of the smallest of Saturn's moons that is spherical in shape—only Mimas is smaller—yet is the only small Saturnian moon that is currently endogenously active, and the smallest known body in the Solar System that is geologically active today. Its surface is morphologically diverse; it includes ancient heavily cratered terrain as well as younger smooth areas with few impact craters. Many plains on Enceladus are fractured and intersected by systems of lineaments. The area around its south pole was found by Cassini to be unusually warm and cut by a system of fractures about 130 km long called "tiger stripes", some of which emit jets of water vapor and dust. These jets form a large plume off its south pole, which replenishes Saturn's E ring and serves as the main source of ions in the magnetosphere of Saturn. The gas and dust are released with a rate of more than 100 kg/s. Enceladus may have liquid water underneath the south-polar surface. The source of the energy for this cryovolcanism is thought to be a 2:1 mean-motion resonance with Dione. The pure ice on the surface makes Enceladus one of the brightest known objects in the Solar System—its geometrical albedo is more than 140%.
- Tethys is the fifth largest of Saturn's moons. Its most prominent features are a large (400 km diameter) impact crater named Odysseus on its leading hemisphere and a vast canyon system named Ithaca Chasma extending at least 270° around Tethys. The Ithaca Chasma is concentric with Odysseus, and these two features may be related. Tethys appears to have no current geological activity. A heavily cratered hilly terrain occupies the majority of its surface, while a smaller and smoother plains region lies on the hemisphere opposite to that of Odysseus. The plains contain fewer craters and are apparently younger. A sharp boundary separates them from the cratered terrain. There is also a system of extensional troughs radiating away from Odysseus. The density of Tethys (0.985 g/cm^{3}) is less than that of water, indicating that it is made mainly of water ice with only a small fraction of rock.
- Dione is the fourth-largest moon of Saturn. It has a higher density than the geologically dead Rhea, but lower than that of active Enceladus. While the majority of Dione's surface is heavily cratered old terrain, this moon is also covered with an extensive network of troughs and lineaments, indicating that in the past it had global tectonic activity. The troughs and lineaments are especially prominent on the trailing hemisphere, where several intersecting sets of fractures form what is called "wispy terrain". The cratered plains have a few large impact craters reaching 250 km in diameter. Smooth plains with low impact-crater counts are also present on a small fraction of its surface. They were probably tectonically resurfaced relatively later in the geological history of Dione. At two locations within smooth plains strange landforms (depressions) resembling oblong impact craters have been identified, both of which lie at the centers of radiating networks of cracks and troughs; these features may be cryovolcanic in origin. Dione may be geologically active even now, although on a scale much smaller than the cryovolcanism of Enceladus. This follows from Cassini magnetic measurements that show Dione is a net source of plasma in the magnetosphere of Saturn, much like Enceladus.
- Rhea is the second-largest of Saturn's moons. It is even slightly larger than Oberon, the second-largest moon of Uranus. In 2005, Cassini detected a depletion of electrons in the plasma wake of Rhea, which forms when the co-rotating plasma of Saturn's magnetosphere is absorbed by the moon. The depletion was hypothesized to be caused by the presence of dust-sized particles concentrated in a few faint equatorial rings. Such a ring system would make Rhea the only moon in the Solar System known to have rings. Subsequent targeted observations of the putative ring plane from several angles by Cassini's narrow-angle camera turned up no evidence of the expected ring material, leaving the origin of the plasma observations unresolved.

Otherwise Rhea has rather a typical heavily cratered surface, with the exceptions of a few large Dione-type fractures (wispy terrain) on the trailing hemisphere and a very faint "line" of material at the equator that may have been deposited by material deorbiting from present or former rings. Rhea also has two very large impact basins on its anti-Saturnian hemisphere, which are about 400 and 500 km across. The first, Tirawa, is roughly comparable to the Odysseus basin on Tethys. There is also a 48 km-diameter impact crater called Inktomi at 112°W that is prominent because of an extended system of bright rays, which may be one of the youngest craters on the inner moons of Saturn. No evidence of any endogenic activity has been discovered on the surface of Rhea.

- Titan, at 5,149 km diameter, is the second largest moon in the Solar System and Saturn's largest. Out of all the large moons, Titan is the only one with a dense (surface pressure of 1.5 atm), cold atmosphere, primarily made of nitrogen with a small fraction of methane. The dense atmosphere frequently produces bright white convective clouds, especially over the south pole region. On 6 June 2013, scientists at the IAA-CSIC reported the detection of polycyclic aromatic hydrocarbons in the upper atmosphere of Titan. On 23 June 2014, NASA claimed to have strong evidence that nitrogen in the atmosphere of Titan came from materials in the Oort cloud, associated with comets, and not from the materials that formed Saturn in earlier times.

The surface of Titan, which is difficult to observe due to persistent atmospheric haze, shows only a few impact craters and is probably very young. It contains a pattern of light and dark regions, flow channels and possibly cryovolcanos. Some dark regions are covered by longitudinal dune fields shaped by tidal winds, where sand is made of frozen water or hydrocarbons. Titan is the only body in the Solar System beside Earth with bodies of liquid on its surface, in the form of methane–ethane lakes in Titan's north and south polar regions. The largest lake, Kraken Mare, is larger than the Caspian Sea. Like the moons Europa and Ganymede of Jupiter, it is believed that Titan has a subsurface ocean made of water mixed with ammonia, which can erupt to the surface of the moon and lead to cryovolcanism. On 2 July 2014, NASA reported the ocean inside Titan may be "as salty as the Earth's Dead Sea".

- Hyperion is Titan's nearest neighbor in the Saturnian system. The two moons are locked in a 4:3 mean-motion resonance with each other, meaning that while Titan makes four revolutions around Saturn, Hyperion makes exactly three. With an average diameter of about 270 km, Hyperion is smaller and lighter than Mimas. It has an extremely irregular shape, and a very odd, tan-colored icy surface resembling a sponge, though its interior may be partially porous as well. The average density of about 0.55 g/cm^{3} indicates that the porosity exceeds 40% even assuming it has a purely icy composition. The surface of Hyperion is covered with numerous impact craters—those with diameters 2–10 km are especially abundant. It is the only moon besides some of the small moons of Pluto known to have a chaotic rotation, which means Hyperion has no well-defined poles or equator. While on short timescales the satellite approximately rotates around its long axis at a rate of 72–75° per day, on longer timescales its axis of rotation (spin vector) wanders chaotically across the sky. This makes the rotational behavior of Hyperion essentially unpredictable.
- Iapetus is the third-largest of Saturn's moons. Orbiting the planet at 3.5 million km, it is by far the most distant of Saturn's round moons, and also has the largest orbital inclination, at 15.47°. Iapetus has long been known for its unusual two-toned surface; its leading hemisphere is pitch-black and its trailing hemisphere is almost as bright as fresh snow. Cassini images showed that the dark material is confined to a large near-equatorial area on the leading hemisphere called Cassini Regio, which extends approximately from 40°N to 40°S. The pole regions of Iapetus are as bright as its trailing hemisphere. Cassini also discovered a 20 km tall equatorial ridge, which spans nearly the moon's entire equator. Otherwise both dark and bright surfaces of Iapetus are old and heavily cratered. The images revealed at least four large impact basins with diameters from 380 to 550 km and numerous smaller impact craters. No evidence of any endogenic activity has been discovered.

A clue to the origin of the dark material covering part of Iapetus's starkly dichromatic surface may have been found in 2009, when NASA's Spitzer Space Telescope discovered a vast, nearly invisible disk around Saturn, just inside the orbit of the moon Phoebe – the Phoebe ring. Scientists believe that the disk originates from dust and ice particles kicked up by impacts on Phoebe. Because the disk particles, like Phoebe itself, orbit in the opposite direction to Iapetus, Iapetus collides with them as they drift in the direction of Saturn, darkening its leading hemisphere slightly. Once a difference in albedo, and hence in average temperature, was established between different regions of Iapetus, a thermal runaway process of water ice sublimation from warmer regions and deposition of water vapor onto colder regions ensued. Iapetus's present two-toned appearance results from the contrast between the bright, primarily ice-coated areas and regions of dark lag, the residue left behind after the loss of surface ice.

=== Irregular moons ===
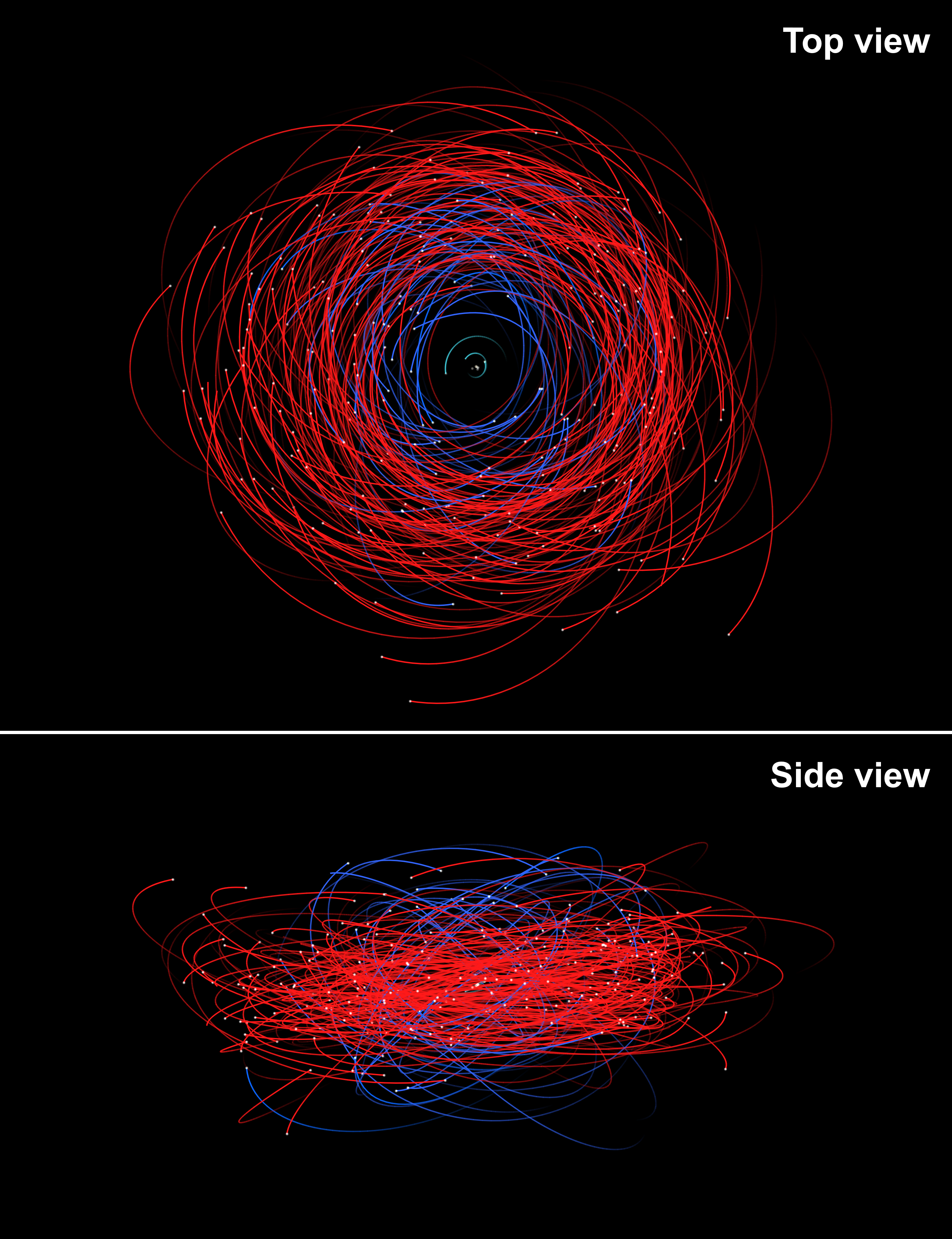
Orbits and positions of Saturn's 250 irregular moons as of March 2025. Prograde orbits are colored blue while retrograde orbits are colored red. Saturn's outermost regular moons, Titan, Hyperion, and Iapetus, are also shown with turquoise orbits.

Irregular moons are small satellites with distant, inclined, and frequently retrograde orbits, believed to have been acquired by the parent planet through a capture process. They often occur as collisional families or groups. The precise size and albedo of many of the irregular moons are not known because they are too small to be resolved by telescopes on Earth and in space, so their sizes are estimated from their brightness by assuming a dark surface or low albedo of around 6% (albedo of Phoebe) or less. The irregular moons generally have featureless visible and near infrared spectra dominated by water absorption bands. They are typically gray (spectrally neutral) or moderately red in color—similar to C-type, P-type, or D-type asteroids, though they are much less red than Kuiper belt objects. (Note: The photometric color may be used as a proxy for the chemical composition of satellites' surfaces.)

==== Inuit ====
The Inuit group includes 39 prograde outer moons that are similar enough in their distances from the planet (190–300 radii of Saturn), their orbital inclinations (43–51°) and their colors that they can be considered a group. The Inuit group is further split into three distinct subgroups at different semi-major axes, and are named after their respective largest members. Ordered by increasing semi-major axis, these subgroups are the Kiviuq subgroup (188 Saturn radii), Paaliaq (249 Saturn radii), and the Siarnaq subgroup (297 Saturn radii). It is unknown whether all of these subgroups of the Inuit group share a common origin.

The Kiviuq group includes 23 members, with the only named members being Ijiraq and the group's largest member and namesake Kiviuq. Kiviuq has a diameter of about 17 km and has a highly elongated shape, which may indicate it is a contact binary. The Siarnaq group includes 15 members, with the only named members being Tarqeq and the group's namesake Siarnaq. Siarnaq is the largest member of its subgroup and the entire Inuit group, with an estimated diameter of about 39 km. The moons of the Kiviuq and Siarnaq subgroups are tightly clustered in semi-major axis and inclination with respect to their namesake moon, which makes them distinct collisional families. In contrast to Kiviuq and Siarnaq, Paaliaq (diameter ~25 km) does not have an associated subgroup.

==== Gallic ====
The Gallic group includes 19 prograde outer moons that are similar in their orbital inclination (34–41°), their orbital eccentricity, and their color that they can be considered a group. The named members of the Gallic group are Albiorix, Bebhionn, Erriapus, and Tarvos. The largest of these moons is Albiorix with an estimated diameter of about 29 km. The Gallic group may be divided into the Albiorix subgroup, which consists of 16 moons with semi-major axes between 200–330 radii of Saturn, and the outlier moon S/2004 S 24 which has a lower eccentricity and a much more distant semi-major axis of ~400 Saturn radii. S/2004 S 24 may not be directly related to the Gallic group, although it is possible that it could have formed as a fragment of an Albiorix subgroup member that was collisionally disrupted when it was at its farthest distance from Saturn in its elliptical orbit.

==== Norse ====
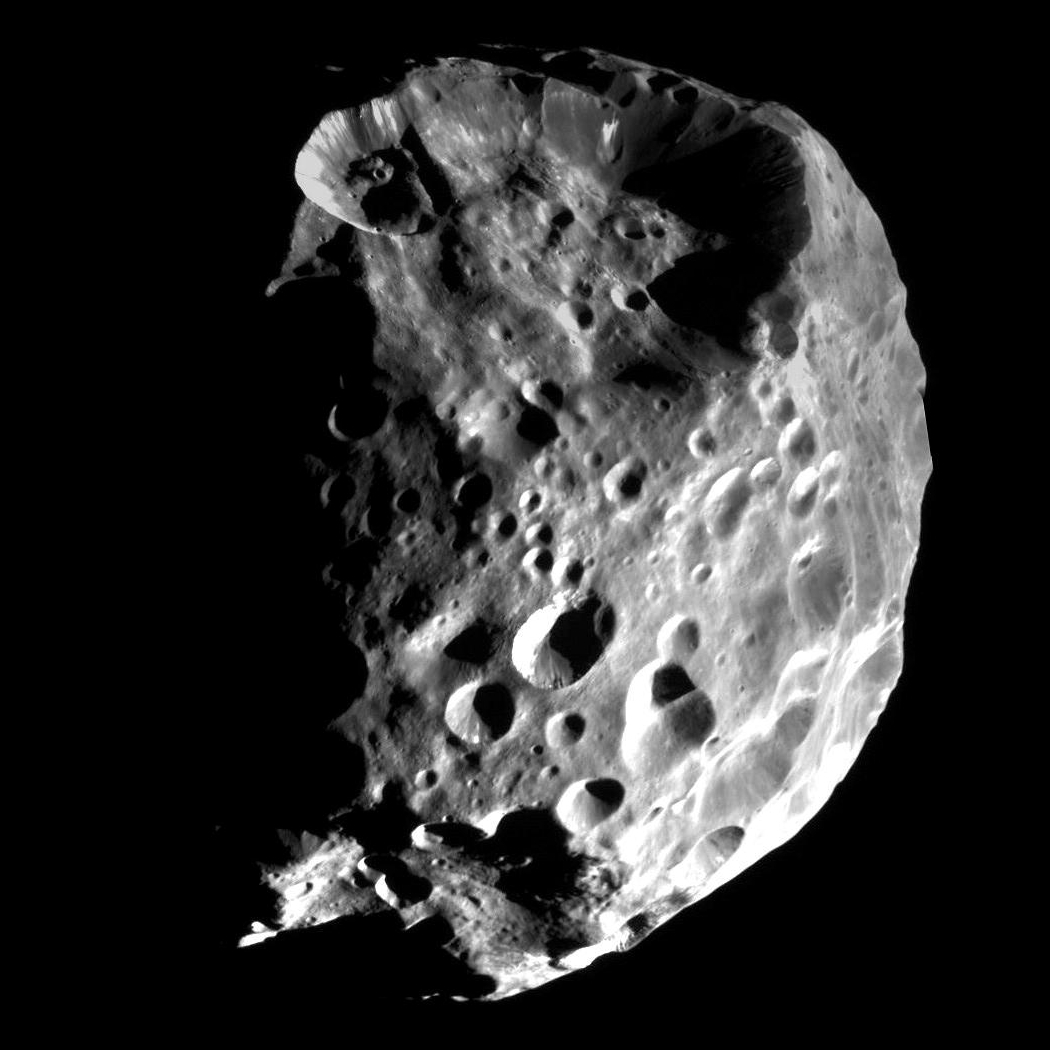
Phoebe, Saturn's largest irregular moon

All 210 retrograde outer moons of Saturn are broadly classified into the Norse group. Only 31 moons of the Norse group have been named: Aegir, Angrboda, Alvaldi, Beli, Bergelmir, Bestla, Eggther, Farbauti, Fenrir, Fornjot, Geirrod, Gerd, Greip, Gridr, Gunnlod, Hati, Hyrrokkin, Jarnsaxa, Kari, Loge, Mundilfari, Narvi, Phoebe, Skathi, Skoll, Skrymir, Surtur, Suttungr, Thiazzi, Thrymr, and Ymir.

Although the Norse group does not show obvious clustering in orbital elements, researchers led by Edward Ashton have proposed splitting the Norse group into four different subgroups by inclination. These subgroups still have a broad range of orbital semi-major axes, inclinations, and eccentricities, and may not necessarily have an impact origin.

- The Phoebe subgroup consists of moons between inclinations 172° and 180° and is named after Phoebe, by far the largest irregular moon of Saturn with a diameter of 213±1.4 km. It has a retrograde orbit and rotates on its axis every 9.3 hours. Phoebe was the first moon of Saturn to be studied in detail by Cassini, in June 2004; during this encounter Cassini was able to map nearly 90% of the moon's surface. Phoebe has a nearly spherical shape and a relatively high density of about 1.6 g/cm^{3}. Cassini images revealed a dark surface scarred by numerous impacts—there are about 130 craters with diameters exceeding 10 km. Such impacts may have ejected fragments of Phoebe into orbit around Saturn—two of these may be S/2006 S 20 and S/2006 S 9, whose orbits are similar to Phoebe. Spectroscopic measurement showed that the surface is made of water ice, carbon dioxide, phyllosilicates, organics and possibly iron-bearing minerals. Phoebe is believed to be a captured centaur that originated in the Kuiper belt. It also serves as a source of material for the largest known ring of Saturn, which darkens the leading hemisphere of Iapetus (see above).
- The Mundilfari subgroup consists of moons between inclinations 157° and 172° and is the most populated of the four Norse subgroups proposed by Ashton and collaborators. Named after its largest member Mundilfari (diameter ~7 km), this subgroup is dominated by tiny moons smaller than 4 km in diameter, which suggests they were formed by a relatively recent collisional event that destroyed a progenitor moon at least 100 million years ago. Ashton and collaborators proposed that this progenitor moon of the Mundifari subgroup would have orbited Saturn at a semi-major axis of ~19.5 million km (~320 Saturn radii), inclination ~165°, and eccentricity ~0.28. The collision that destroyed this progenitor moon would have to eject its fragments at a speed of at least 200 m/s, and subsequent collisions of its fragments may further disperse their orbits to produce the broad orbital distribution of the Mundilfari group observed today.
- The Kari subgroup consists of moons between inclinations 151.7° and 157° and appears mostly concentrated around the orbit of its namesake and largest member Kari (diameter ~6 km) with a semi-major axis range between 0.14–0.16 AU (21–24 million km) from Saturn. This tight clustering may be a collisional family. There are several other moons in the Kari subgroup's inclination range that have semi-major axes less than the aforementioned range, and thus may not be related to the proposed collisional family.
- The remaining Norse group moons with inclinations below 151.7° are sparse in number and are assigned to the low-inclination subgroup by Ashton and collaborators. Of the moons of the low-inclination subgroup, Narvi and S/2019 S 11 have the most similar orbits to each other, which suggests these two moons share an origin.

== List of moons ==
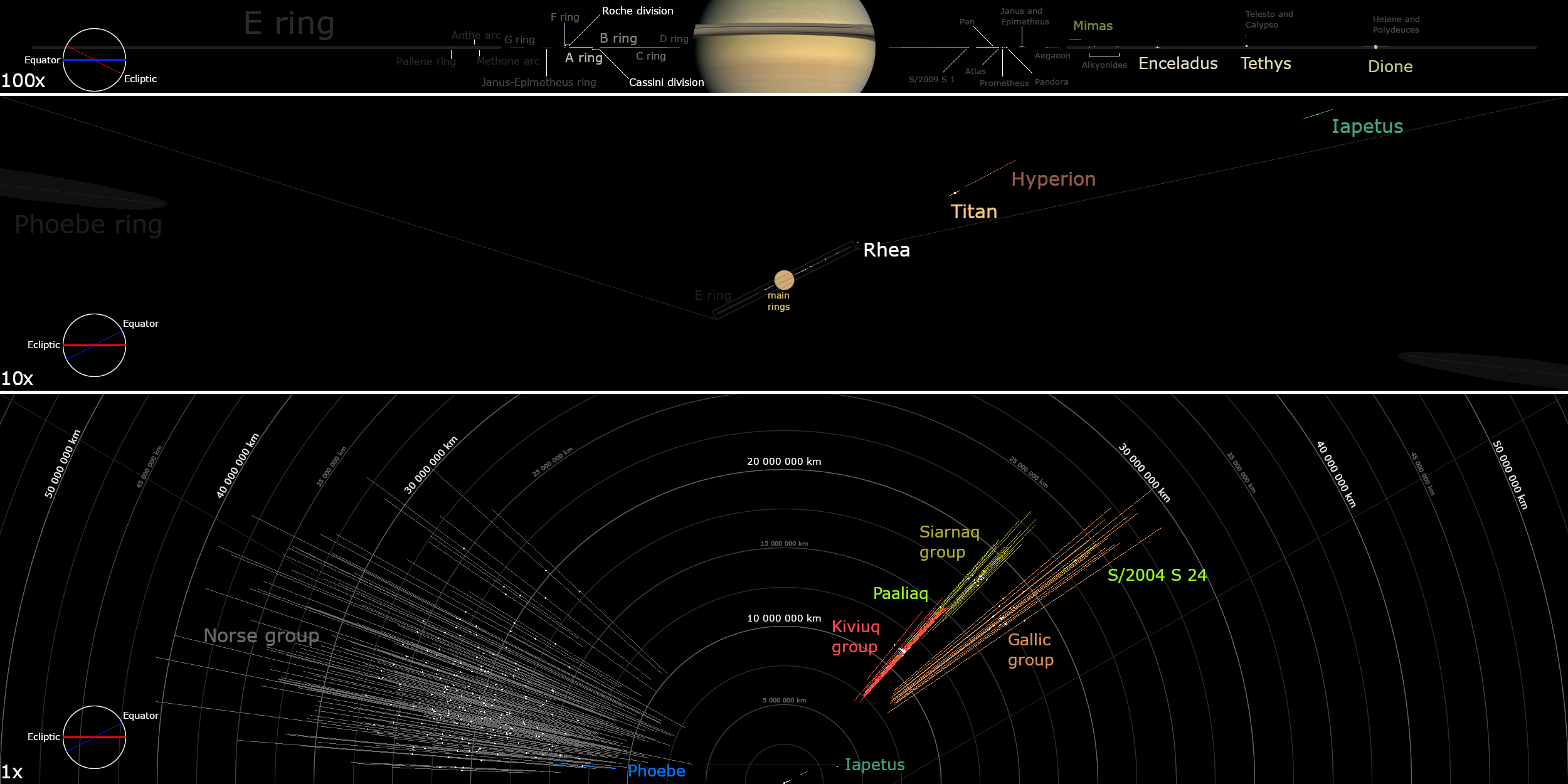
Orbital diagram of the orbital inclination and orbital distances for Saturn's rings and moon system at various scales. Notable moons, moon groups, and rings are individually labeled. Open the image for full resolution.

The Saturnian moons are listed here by orbital period (or semi-major axis), from shortest to longest. Moons massive enough for their surfaces to have collapsed into a spheroid are highlighted in bold and marked with a blue background, while the irregular moons are listed in red, orange, and gray background. The orbits and mean distances of the irregular moons are strongly variable over short timescales due to frequent planetary and solar perturbations, so the orbital elements of irregular moons listed here are averaged over a 5,000-year numerical integration by the Jet Propulsion Laboratory. These may sometimes strongly differ from the osculating orbital elements orbital elements provided by other sources. Otherwise, recently discovered irregular moons without published proper elements are temporarily listed here with inaccurate osculating orbital elements that are italicized to distinguish them from other irregular moons with proper orbital elements. The mean orbital elements are based on a reference epoch of 1 January 2000.

Key
Other regular moons (18)	♠ **Major moons** (7)	♦ Inuit group (39)	♣ Gallic group (19)	‡ Norse group (210)

Label (Note: A confirmed moon is given a permanent designation by the IAU consisting of a name and a Roman numeral. The eight moons that were known before 1850 are numbered in order of their distance from Saturn; the rest are numbered in the order by which they received their permanent designations. Many small moons have not yet received a permanent designation.)	Name	Pronunciation	Image	Abs. magn. (Note: Absolute magnitudes of regular satellites are calculated from their mean diameters and geometric albedos given in their respective Wikipedia articles. Absolute magnitude estimates for some small inner moons are not available as they do not have measured geometric albedos. Absolute magnitudes of irregular satellites were taken from the Minor Planet Center's Natural Satellites Ephemeris Service.)	Diameter (km) (Note: The diameters and dimensions of the small inner moons, from Pan to Helene, are taken from Thomas et al., 2020, Table 1. Diameters and dimensions of Mimas, Enceladus, Tethys, Dione, Rhea, Iapetus, and Phoebe are from Thomas 2010, Table 1. Diameters of Siarnaq and Albiorix are from Grav et al., 2015, Table 3. The approximate sizes of all other irregular satellites are calculated from their absolute magnitudes with an assumed geometric albedo of 0.04, which is the average value for that population. Calculations were made with NASA/JPL's Asteroid Size Estimator.)	Mass (×10^{15} kg) (Note: Masses of the large round moons, including Hyperion, Phoebe, and Helene, were taken from Jacobson et al., 2022, Table 5. Masses of Atlas, Prometheus, Pandora, Epimetheus, and Janus were taken from Lainey et al., 2023, Table 1. Masses of Pan, Daphnis, Aegaeon, Methone, and Pallene were taken from Thomas et al., 2020, Table 2. Masses of other regular satellites were calculated by multiplying their volumes with an assumed density of 500 kg/m^{3} (0.5 g/cm^{3}), while masses of irregular satellites were calculated with an assumed density of 1000 kg/m^{3} (1.0 g/cm^{3}).)	Semi-major axis (km)	Orbital period (d) (Note: Negative orbital periods indicate a retrograde orbit around Saturn (opposite to the planet's rotation). Orbital periods of irregular satellites may not directly correlate with their semi-major axes due to perturbations.)	Inclination (°) (Note: Orbital inclinations of regular satellites and Phoebe are with respect to their Laplace planes. Orbital inclinations of irregular satellites are with respect to the ecliptic.)	Eccentricity	Group (Note: The irregular moons are categorized as described in Ashton et al., 2025a. Otherwise, for the 128 newly discovered satellites not included in the paper, they are sorted into their categories based on the inclination and semi-major axis criteria stated in Ashton et al., 2025a.)	Discovery year	Year announced	Discoverer
	S/2009 S 1	—		—	0.3	≈ 0.0000071	116914	+0.47203	≈ 0.0	≈ 0.000		2009	2009	Cassini
	S/2009 S 2	—		—	?		117059	+0.47290	≈ 0.0	≈ 0.000		2009	2026	Spitale
XVIII	Pan	/ˈpæn/	An irregularly shaped body with a prominent equatorial ridge. It is illuminated from the bottom right.	8.6	28.2 (35 × 28 × 21)	4.30	133600	+0.57505	0.0	0.000	inner ring	1990	1990	Showalter
XXXV	Daphnis	/ˈdæfnəs/	A small, irregularly shaped body elongated from the bottom left to top right. It is illuminated from the bottom left.	11.3	7.6 (9.8 × 8.4 × 5.6)	0.068	136500	+0.59408	0.0	0.000	inner ring	2005	2005	Cassini
XV	Atlas	/ˈætləs/	An irregularly shaped body is fully illuminated. The body, which looks like a cone viewed from the south pole, is elongated downward.	8.5	30.2 (41 × 35 × 19)	5.490	137700	+0.60460	0.0	0.001	inner ring	1980	1980	Voyager 1
XVI	Prometheus	/proʊˈmiːθiəs/	An irregularly shaped oblong body is fully illuminated. It is elongated in the direction from the top left to bottom left. Its surface is covered by craters.	5.9	86.2 (137 × 81 × 56)	159.72	139400	+0.61588	0.0	0.002	inner ring	1980	1980	Voyager 1
XVII	Pandora	/pænˈdɔːrə/	An irregularly shaped body is half illuminated from the bottom. The terminator runs from the left to right. The surface is covered by numerous craters.	6.1	81.4 (104 × 81 × 64)	135.7	141700	+0.63137	0.0	0.004	inner ring	1980	1980	Voyager 1
XI	Epimetheus	/ɛpəˈmiːθiəs/	A partially-illuminated irregular body, which has a shape remotely resembling a cube. The body's surface consists of ridges and valleys and is covered by craters.	5.6	116.2 (130 × 114 × 106)	525.607	151400	+0.69701	0.3	0.020	co-orbital (with Janus)	1966	1967	Fountain & Larson
X	Janus	/ˈdʒeɪnəs/	An irregular body, whose outline looks like an approximate circle in this image. It is illuminated from the bottom-left. The terminator runs from the top-left to bottom-right. The surface is covered by craters.	4.8	179 (203 × 185 × 153)	1893.88	151500	+0.69735	0.2	0.007	co-orbital (with Epimetheus)	1966	1967	Dollfus
LIII	Aegaeon	/iːˈdʒiːɒn/	Image of Aegaeon by Cassini.	—	0.66 (1.4 × 0.5 × 0.4)	0.0000782	167500	+0.80812	0.0	0.000	ring-embedded	2008	2009	Cassini
I	♠**Mimas**	/ˈmaɪməs/	A spherical body is half illuminated from the left. The terminator runs from the top to bottom in the vicinity of the right limb. A large crater with a central peak sits on the terminator slightly to the right and above the center of the body. It makes the body look like the Death Star. There are numerous smaller craters.	2.7	396.4 (416 × 393 × 381)	37509.4	186000	+0.94242	1.6	0.020		1789	1789	Herschel
XXXII	Methone	/məˈθoʊniː/	A smooth, featureless ellipsoidal object illuminated from the top right, distinctly looking like an egg.	13.9	2.9 (4.0 × 2.6 × 2.4)	0.00392	194700	+1.00955	0.0	0.002	ring-embedded	2004	2004	Cassini
XLIX	Anthe	/ˈænθiː/	A blurry ellipsoidal object in the center of the image	—	1.8	≈ 0.0015	198100	+1.03890	0.0	0.002	ring-embedded	2007	2007	Cassini
XXXIII	Pallene	/pəˈliːniː/	A small, half-illuminated ellipsoidal object in front of Saturn as a backdrop	13.2	4.44 (5.8 × 4.2 × 3.7)	≈ 0.023	212300	+1.15606	0.2	0.004	ring-embedded	2004	2004	Cassini
II	♠**Enceladus**	/ɛnˈsɛlədəs/		1.8	504.2 (513 × 503 × 497)	108031.8	238400	+1.37022	0.0	0.005		1789	1789	Herschel
III	♠**Tethys**	/ˈtiːθəs/		0.3	1062.2 (1077 × 1057 × 1053)	617495.9	295000	+1.88780	1.1	0.001		1684	1684	Cassini
XIII	Telesto	/təˈlɛstoʊ/	An oblong object with a few large craters and a smooth surface	8.7	24.8 (33 × 23 × 19)	≈ 3.9	295000	+1.88780	1.2	0.001	trojan (Tethys L_{4})	1980	1980	Smith et al.
XIV	Calypso	/kəˈlɪpsoʊ/	An oblong body is seen in this low resolution image.	8.9	21.4 (29 × 19 × 13)	≈ 1.8	295000	+1.88780	1.5	0.001	trojan (Tethys L_{5})	1980	1980	Pascu et al.
XII	Helene	/ˈhɛləniː/	An irregularly shaped body illuminated from the left. Its surface is covered by numerous impact craters.	7.3	35.2 (45 × 39 × 27)	7.1	377600	+2.73692	0.2	0.007	trojan (Dione L_{4})	1980	1980	Laques & Lecacheux
XXXIV	Polydeuces	/pɒliˈdjuːsiːz/	A small oblong body is barely resolved in this image.	13.0	2.6 (3.5 × 3.1 × 2.7)	≈ 0.0075	377600	+2.73692	0.2	0.019	trojan (Dione L_{5})	2004	2004	Cassini
IV	♠**Dione**	/daɪˈoʊniː/		0.4	1122.8 (1128 × 1123 × 1119)	1095486.8	377700	+2.73692	0.0	0.002		1684	1684	Cassini
V	♠**Rhea**	/ˈreɪə/		−0.2	1527.6 (1530 × 1526 × 1525)	2306485.4	527200	+4.51750	0.3	0.001		1672	1673	Cassini
VI	♠**Titan**	/ˈtaɪtən/		−1.3	5149.46 (5149 × 5149 × 5150)	134518035.4	1221900	+15.9454	0.3	0.029		1655	1656	Huygens
VII	Hyperion	/haɪˈpɪəriən/	An irregularly shaped oblong body is illuminated from the left. The terminator is near the right limb. The body is elongated in the top-bottom direction. The surface is punctured by numerous impact craters, which make it look like a sponge or cheese.	4.4	270.0 (360 × 266 × 205)	5551.0	1481500	+21.2767	0.6	0.105		1848	1848	Bond & Lassell
VIII	♠**Iapetus**	/aɪˈæpətəs/		2.0	1468.6 (1491 × 1491 × 1424)	1805659.1	3561700	+79.3310	7.6	0.028		1671	1673	Cassini
	♦S/2023 S 1	―		16.6	≈ 3	≈ 0.014	11205400	+442.86	48.8	0.386	Inuit group (Kiviuq)	2023	2025	Ashton et al.
	♦S/2019 S 1	—		15.3	≈ 5	≈ 0.11	11245400	+445.17	49.5	0.383	Inuit group (Kiviuq)	2019	2021	Ashton et al.
	♦S/2004 S 54	―		16.1	≈ 4	≈ 0.034	11277500	+447.14	48.1	0.373	Inuit group (Kiviuq)	2004	2025	Sheppard et al.
	♦S/2023 S 56	―		17.1	≈ 3	≈ 0.014	11287500	+447.75	45.4	0.358	Inuit group (Kiviuq)	2023	2026	Ashton et al.
	♦S/2004 S 55	―		16.5	≈ 3	≈ 0.014	11294700	+448.16	48.9	0.260	Inuit group (Kiviuq)	2004	2025	Sheppard et al.
	♦S/2020 S 11	―		16.9	≈ 3	≈ 0.014	11295600	+448.21	48.2	0.372	Inuit group (Kiviuq)	2020	2025	Ashton et al.
	♦S/2019 S 22	―		16.7	≈ 3	≈ 0.014	11305100	+448.48	47.3	0.369	Inuit group (Kiviuq)	2019	2025	Ashton et al.
	♦S/2020 S 49	―		16.9	≈ 2	≈ 0.004	11305900	+448.84	48.0	0.373	Inuit group (Kiviuq)	2020	2026	Ashton et al.
XXIV	♦Kiviuq	/ˈkɪviək/		12.7	≈ 17	≈ 3.6	11307400	+448.91	48.0	0.275	Inuit group (Kiviuq)	2000	2000	Gladman et al.
	♦S/2023 S 2	―		16.7	≈ 3	≈ 0.014	11309900	+449.05	45.7	0.339	Inuit group (Kiviuq)	2023	2025	Ashton et al.
	♦S/2019 S 23	―		16.7	≈ 3	≈ 0.014	11310200	+449.08	48.7	0.255	Inuit group (Kiviuq)	2019	2025	Ashton et al.
	♦S/2020 S 12	―		16.8	≈ 3	≈ 0.014	11314500	+449.33	50.8	0.260	Inuit group (Kiviuq)	2020	2025	Ashton et al.
	♦S/2005 S 4	—		15.7	≈ 5	≈ 0.065	11324500	+449.93	48.0	0.315	Inuit group (Kiviuq)	2005	2023	Sheppard et al.
	♦S/2019 S 25	―		16.4	≈ 4	≈ 0.034	11329400	+450.22	48.1	0.271	Inuit group (Kiviuq)	2019	2025	Ashton et al.
	♦S/2020 S 1	—		15.9	≈ 4	≈ 0.034	11338600	+450.77	48.2	0.337	Inuit group (Kiviuq)	2020	2023	Ashton et al.
XXII	♦Ijiraq	/ˈiːɪrɒk/		13.2	≈ 13	≈ 1.8	11344700	+451.12	49.2	0.293	Inuit group (Kiviuq)	2000	2000	Gladman et al.
	♦S/2020 S 48	―		16.8	≈ 3	≈ 0.014	11355100	+451.75	45.9	0.373	Inuit group (Kiviuq)	2020	2026	Ashton et al.
	♦S/2019 S 24	―		16.1	≈ 4	≈ 0.034	11360500	+452.07	46.7	0.345	Inuit group (Kiviuq)	2019	2025	Ashton et al.
	♦S/2007 S 10	―		16.1	≈ 4	≈ 0.034	11364900	+452.36	45.8	0.367	Inuit group (Kiviuq)	2007	2025	Sheppard et al.
	♦S/2019 S 26	―		16.5	≈ 3	≈ 0.014	11390900	+453.89	48.1	0.365	Inuit group (Kiviuq)	2019	2025	Ashton et al.
	♦S/2020 S 13	―		16.5	≈ 3	≈ 0.014	11415600	+455.39	48.0	0.373	Inuit group (Kiviuq)	2020	2025	Ashton et al.
	‡S/2023 S 50	―		16.9	≈ 3	≈ 0.014	11656500	−469.82	166.1	0.263	Norse group (Mundilfari)	2023	2025	Ashton et al.
	♦S/2023 S 6	―		16.4	≈ 3	≈ 0.014	11953100	+487.91	47.4	0.336	Inuit group (Kiviuq)	2023	2025	Ashton et al.
	♦S/2023 S 7	―		15.9	≈ 4	≈ 0.034	12133700	+499.01	44.7	0.284	Inuit group (Kiviuq)	2023	2025	Ashton et al.
	‡S/2023 S 38	―		17.0	≈ 3	≈ 0.014	12823500	−546.31	149.2	0.909	Norse group (low-inclination)	2023	2025	Ashton et al.
IX	‡Phoebe	/ˈfiːbi/	An approximately spherical heavily cratered body is illuminated from the bottom-right. The terminator runs near the left and top limbs. There is huge crater at the top, which affects the shape, and another slightly smaller at the bottom.	6.7	213.0 (219 × 217 × 204)	8312.3	12929400	−550.30	175.2	0.164	Norse group (Phoebe)	1898	1899	Pickering
	‡S/2023 S 9	―		16.7	≈ 3	≈ 0.014	13167500	−564.11	172.2	0.141	Norse group (Phoebe)	2023	2025	Ashton et al.
	‡S/2006 S 20	—		15.8	≈ 5	≈ 0.065	13193700	−565.79	173.1	0.206	Norse group (Phoebe)	2006	2023	Sheppard et al.
	‡S/2004 S 56	―		15.8	≈ 5	≈ 0.065	13670200	−596.69	161.6	0.339	Norse group (Mundilfari)	2004	2025	Sheppard et al.
	‡S/2023 S 8	―		16.7	≈ 3	≈ 0.014	14018800	−619.69	166.9	0.122	Norse group (Mundilfari)	2023	2025	Ashton et al.
	‡S/2023 S 62	―		16.9	≈ 2	≈ 0.004	14025900	−620.15	155.6	0.467	Norse group (Kari)	2023	2026	Ashton et al.
	‡S/2023 S 11	―		16.9	≈ 3	≈ 0.014	14046100	−621.49	170.9	0.300	Norse group (Mundilfari)	2023	2025	Ashton et al.
	‡S/2006 S 9	—		16.5	≈ 3	≈ 0.014	14406700	−645.58	173.0	0.249	Norse group (Phoebe)	2006	2023	Sheppard et al.
	‡S/2006 S 21	―		16.7	≈ 3	≈ 0.014	14976500	−684.28	169.8	0.204	Norse group (Mundilfari)	2006	2025	Sheppard et al.
XX	♦Paaliaq	/ˈpɑːliɒk/		11.7	≈ 25	≈ 14	14997700	+685.72	48.5	0.378	Inuit group (Note: The moon has a similar inclination, but a significantly different semi-major axis. Therefore, it is uncertain whether it comes from the same parent body as the rest of the Inuit group.)	2000	2000	Gladman et al.
	‡S/2006 S 22	―		16.7	≈ 3	≈ 0.014	15109500	−693.41	172.0	0.246	Norse group (Phoebe) (Note: This moon's inclination of 172.0° is at the exact boundary between the Phoebe (i > 172°) and Mundilfari subgroups (172° > i > 157°). Because neither group's range is inclusive of the boundary value, S/2006 S 22 has been arbitrarily assigned to the Phoebe subgroup.)	2006	2025	Sheppard et al.
	‡S/2023 S 13	―		16.6	≈ 3	≈ 0.014	15193000	−699.18	168.5	0.179	Norse group (Mundilfari)	2023	2025	Ashton et al.
	‡S/2023 S 10	―		16.7	≈ 3	≈ 0.014	15500200	−720.49	163.0	0.302	Norse group (Mundilfari)	2023	2025	Ashton et al.
XXVII	‡Skathi	/ˈskɑːði/		14.3	≈ 8	≈ 0.38	15575400	−725.73	151.6	0.281	Norse group (low-inclination)	2000	2000	Gladman et al.
	‡S/2023 S 12	―		16.9	≈ 3	≈ 0.014	15805900	−741.92	168.8	0.601	Norse group (Mundilfari)	2023	2025	Ashton et al.
	‡S/2007 S 5	—		16.2	≈ 4	≈ 0.034	15835600	−744.01	158.4	0.104	Norse group (Mundilfari)	2007	2023	Sheppard et al.
	‡S/2007 S 7	—		16.2	≈ 4	≈ 0.034	15931600	−750.80	169.3	0.217	Norse group (Mundilfari)	2007	2023	Sheppard et al.
	‡S/2007 S 2	—		15.6	≈ 5	≈ 0.065	15939100	−751.33	174.0	0.232	Norse group (Phoebe) (Note: The moon has been identified as potentially belonging to the Mundilfari subgroup due to its inclination and semi-major axis.)	2007	2007	Sheppard et al.
	‡S/2004 S 37	—		15.9	≈ 4	≈ 0.034	15956300	−752.55	158.2	0.448	Norse group (Mundilfari)	2004	2019	Sheppard et al.
	‡S/2004 S 47	—		16.3	≈ 4	≈ 0.034	16050700	−759.22	160.9	0.291	Norse group (Mundilfari)	2004	2023	Sheppard et al.
	‡S/2004 S 40	—		16.3	≈ 4	≈ 0.034	16075600	−761.00	169.2	0.297	Norse group (Mundilfari)	2004	2023	Sheppard et al.
	‡S/2020 S 14	―		16.7	≈ 3	≈ 0.014	16186200	−768.86	161.7	0.313	Norse group (Mundilfari)	2020	2025	Ashton et al.
	‡S/2019 S 27	―		16.7	≈ 3	≈ 0.014	16267000	−774.63	162.1	0.420	Norse group (Mundilfari)	2019	2025	Ashton et al.
XXVI	♣Albiorix	/ˌælbiˈɒrɪks/		11.2	28.6	≈ 12	16329200	+779.07	36.8	0.482	Gallic group	2000	2000	Holman
	‡S/2019 S 2	—		16.5	≈ 3	≈ 0.014	16560300	−795.67	173.3	0.279	Norse group (Phoebe)	2019	2023	Ashton et al.
	♣S/2020 S 15	―		16.7	≈ 3	≈ 0.014	16729200	+807.82	37.1	0.462	Gallic group	2020	2025	Ashton et al.
	‡S/2023 S 14	―		16.8	≈ 3	≈ 0.014	16853000	−816.86	171.6	0.497	Norse group (Mundilfari)	2023	2025	Ashton et al.
	♣S/2023 S 55	―		16.9	≈ 3	≈ 0.014	16875100	+818.51	35.9	0.491	Gallic group	2023	2026	Ashton et al.
	‡S/2020 S 16	―		16.5	≈ 3	≈ 0.014	16963400	−824.92	167.3	0.405	Norse group (Mundilfari)	2020	2025	Ashton et al.
	‡S/2023 S 16	―		16.8	≈ 3	≈ 0.014	17005300	−827.81	162.6	0.270	Norse group (Mundilfari)	2023	2025	Ashton et al.
XXXVII	♣Bebhionn	/ˈbeɪvɪn/		15.0	≈ 6	≈ 0.18	17027300	+829.64	38.6	0.459	Gallic group	2004	2005	Sheppard et al.
	♣S/2007 S 8	—		16.0	≈ 4	≈ 0.034	17048900	+831.21	36.2	0.490	Gallic group	2007	2023	Sheppard et al.
LX	♣S/2004 S 29	—		15.7	≈ 5	≈ 0.065	17063900	+832.27	38.6	0.485	Gallic group	2004	2019	Sheppard et al.
	‡S/2019 S 3	—		16.2	≈ 4	≈ 0.034	17077400	−833.19	166.9	0.248	Norse group (Mundilfari)	2019	2023	Ashton et al.
	‡S/2020 S 17	―		16.3	≈ 4	≈ 0.034	17094200	−834.45	148.9	0.378	Norse group (low-inclination)	2020	2025	Ashton et al.
	‡S/2023 S 53	―		16.8	≈ 3	≈ 0.014	17181100	−840.82	171.2	0.103	Norse group (Mundilfari)	2023	2026	Ashton et al.
	‡S/2023 S 58	―		16.9	≈ 2	≈ 0.004	17206000	−842.68	169.6	0.093	Norse group (Mundilfari)	2023	2026	Ashton et al.
	‡S/2023 S 20	―		16.7	≈ 3	≈ 0.014	17261000	−846.77	136.5	0.442	Norse group (low-inclination)	2023	2025	Ashton et al.
	♣S/2019 S 29	―		16.5	≈ 3	≈ 0.014	17353900	+853.62	37.7	0.441	Gallic group	2019	2025	Ashton et al.
	♣S/2023 S 18	―		16.8	≈ 3	≈ 0.014	17381700	+855.65	36.7	0.448	Gallic group	2023	2025	Ashton et al.
	♣S/2023 S 17	―		17.1	≈ 3	≈ 0.014	17385300	+855.94	35.9	0.498	Gallic group	2023	2025	Ashton et al.
	‡S/2020 S 7	—		16.8	≈ 3	≈ 0.014	17394000	−856.53	161.4	0.500	Norse group (Mundilfari)	2020	2023	Ashton et al.
	♣S/2007 S 11	―		16.3	≈ 4	≈ 0.034	17434400	+859.53	35.5	0.499	Gallic group	2007	2025	Sheppard et al.
	♣S/2023 S 54	―		17.0	≈ 3	≈ 0.014	17485100	+863.35	37.8	0.480	Gallic group	2023	2026	Ashton et al.
	‡S/2023 S 60	―		16.8	≈ 2	≈ 0.004	17493700	−863.96	170.7	0.206	Norse group (Mundilfari)	2023	2026	Ashton et al.
	‡S/2019 S 28	―		16.3	≈ 4	≈ 0.034	17496000	−864.09	158.4	0.199	Norse group (Mundilfari)	2019	2025	Ashton et al.
	♦S/2004 S 31	—		15.6	≈ 5	≈ 0.065	17497100	+863.92	48.0	0.159	Inuit group (Siarnaq)	2004	2019	Sheppard et al.
XXVIII	♣Erriapus	/ɛriˈæpəs/		13.7	≈ 10	≈ 0.95	17506900	+864.92	37.1	0.475	Gallic group	2000	2000	Gladman et al.
	♦S/2023 S 19	―		17.0	≈ 3	≈ 0.014	17590300	+870.92	48.2	0.092	Inuit group (Siarnaq)	2023	2025	Ashton et al.
XLVII	‡Skoll	/ˈskɒl/		15.4	≈ 5	≈ 0.11	17623400	−873.57	159.4	0.463	Norse group (Mundilfari)	2006	2006	Sheppard et al.
	♦S/2023 S 3	―		16.5	≈ 3	≈ 0.014	17646400	+875.00	46.9	0.178	Inuit group (Siarnaq)	2023	2025	Ashton et al.
	‡S/2019 S 30	―		16.8	≈ 3	≈ 0.014	17709900	−879.97	168.3	0.107	Norse group (Mundilfari)	2019	2025	Ashton et al.
	♦S/2020 S 19	―		16.8	≈ 3	≈ 0.014	17726700	+881.04	48.1	0.159	Inuit group (Siarnaq)	2020	2025	Ashton et al.
	♣S/2019 S 31	―		16.5	≈ 3	≈ 0.014	17739100	+882.24	39.8	0.488	Gallic group	2019	2025	Ashton et al.
LII	♦Tarqeq	/ˈtɑːrkeɪk/		14.8	≈ 7	≈ 0.18	17751000	+882.85	48.7	0.144	Inuit group (Siarnaq)	2007	2007	Sheppard et al.
	‡S/2023 S 21	―		16.9	≈ 3	≈ 0.014	17755400	−883.31	157.3	0.077	Norse group (Mundilfari)	2023	2025	Ashton et al.
	‡S/2023 S 4	―		16.4	≈ 3	≈ 0.014	17764600	−884.11	170.0	0.276	Norse group (Mundilfari)	2023	2025	Ashton et al.
	‡S/2020 S 18	―		16.6	≈ 3	≈ 0.014	17777900	−885.12	168.9	0.180	Norse group (Mundilfari)	2020	2025	Ashton et al.
	♦S/2019 S 14	—		16.3	≈ 4	≈ 0.034	17852800	+890.59	46.2	0.172	Inuit group (Siarnaq)	2019	2023	Ashton et al.
	‡S/2020 S 2	—		16.9	≈ 3	≈ 0.014	17869000	−891.86	170.7	0.152	Norse group (Mundilfari)	2020	2023	Ashton et al.
XXIX	♦Siarnaq	/ˈsiːɑːrnək/		10.6	39.3	≈ 32	17881100	+892.68	47.8	0.308	Inuit group (Siarnaq)	2000	2000	Gladman et al.
	‡S/2019 S 4	—		16.5	≈ 3	≈ 0.014	17951900	−898.09	170.1	0.408	Norse group (Mundilfari)	2019	2023	Ashton et al.
	♦S/2019 S 32	―		15.7	≈ 5	≈ 0.065	17960500	+898.71	46.2	0.276	Inuit group (Siarnaq)	2019	2025	Ashton et al.
	‡S/2020 S 20	―		16.6	≈ 3	≈ 0.014	17997300	−901.53	169.8	0.133	Norse group (Mundilfari)	2020	2025	Ashton et al.
	♦S/2020 S 3	—		16.4	≈ 3	≈ 0.014	18056800	+905.84	46.0	0.142	Inuit group (Siarnaq)	2020	2023	Ashton et al.
	‡S/2023 S 61	―		16.6	≈ 3	≈ 0.014	18067700	−906.85	158.0	0.557	Norse group (Mundilfari)	2023	2026	Ashton et al.
	‡S/2004 S 41	—		16.3	≈ 4	≈ 0.034	18095400	−908.89	165.7	0.301	Norse group (Mundilfari)	2004	2023	Sheppard et al.
	♦S/2005 S 6	―		16.3	≈ 4	≈ 0.034	18107300	+909.58	47.7	0.084	Inuit group (Siarnaq)	2005	2025	Sheppard et al.
	‡S/2004 S 57	―		16.2	≈ 4	≈ 0.034	18150500	−913.07	167.9	0.263	Norse group (Mundilfari)	2004	2025	Sheppard et al.
	♦S/2019 S 6	—		15.7	≈ 5	≈ 0.065	18205600	+917.11	46.4	0.120	Inuit group (Siarnaq)	2019	2023	Ashton et al.
	‡S/2006 S 24	―		16.8	≈ 3	≈ 0.014	18210700	−917.56	165.9	0.352	Norse group (Mundilfari)	2006	2025	Sheppard et al.
XXI	♣Tarvos	/ˈtɑːrvəs/		13.1	≈ 15	≈ 2.1	18216600	+917.98	37.8	0.522	Gallic group	2000	2000	Gladman et al.
	♣S/2020 S 4	—		17.0	≈ 3	≈ 0.014	18236400	+919.52	40.1	0.496	Gallic group	2020	2023	Ashton et al.
	‡S/2023 S 30	―		16.7	≈ 3	≈ 0.014	18238300	−919.71	142.4	0.493	Norse group (low-inclination)	2023	2025	Ashton et al.
	‡S/2004 S 42	—		16.1	≈ 4	≈ 0.034	18240700	−919.88	165.7	0.158	Norse group (Mundilfari)	2004	2023	Sheppard et al.
	‡S/2023 S 15	―		16.8	≈ 3	≈ 0.014	18241300	−919.93	161.9	0.549	Norse group (Mundilfari)	2023	2025	Ashton et al.
	♦S/2004 S 58	―		15.8	≈ 5	≈ 0.065	18254500	+920.80	45.7	0.249	Inuit group (Siarnaq)	2004	2025	Sheppard et al.
	♦S/2006 S 23	―		16.4	≈ 3	≈ 0.014	18269700	+921.86	43.8	0.190	Inuit group (Siarnaq)	2006	2025	Sheppard et al.
XLIV	‡Hyrrokkin	/hɪˈrɒkən/		14.3	≈ 8	≈ 0.38	18340900	−927.46	149.9	0.336	Norse group (low-inclination)	2004	2005	Sheppard et al.
	‡S/2023 S 24	―		16.7	≈ 3	≈ 0.014	18351800	−928.25	169.7	0.374	Norse group (Mundilfari)	2023	2025	Ashton et al.
LI	‡Greip	/ˈɡreɪp/		15.3	≈ 5	≈ 0.11	18380000	−930.44	174.2	0.317	Norse group (Phoebe)	2006	2006	Sheppard et al.
	♦S/2020 S 5	—		16.6	≈ 3	≈ 0.014	18391000	+931.19	48.2	0.220	Inuit group (Siarnaq)	2020	2023	Ashton et al.
	♣S/2019 S 34	―		16.8	≈ 3	≈ 0.014	18446800	+935.45	37.6	0.536	Gallic group	2019	2025	Ashton et al.
	‡S/2004 S 13	—		16.3	≈ 4	≈ 0.034	18453700	−936.09	169.0	0.265	Norse group (Mundilfari)	2004	2005	Sheppard et al.
	‡S/2023 S 63	―		16.0	≈ 4	≈ 0.034	18482600	−938.25	165.0	0.266	Norse group (Mundilfari)	2023	2026	Ashton et al.
	♣S/2005 S 7	―		16.4	≈ 3	≈ 0.014	18502500	+939.75	34.6	0.565	Gallic group	2005	2025	Sheppard et al.
	‡S/2007 S 6	—		16.4	≈ 3	≈ 0.014	18545000	−942.98	166.5	0.168	Norse group (Mundilfari)	2007	2023	Sheppard et al.
	‡S/2019 S 35	―		16.7	≈ 3	≈ 0.014	18557800	−944.00	157.3	0.577	Norse group (Mundilfari)	2019	2025	Ashton et al.
	‡S/2006 S 25	―		16.4	≈ 3	≈ 0.014	18572400	−945.07	158.8	0.303	Norse group (Mundilfari)	2006	2025	Sheppard et al.
	♦S/2023 S 22	―		16.3	≈ 4	≈ 0.034	18577500	+945.37	47.5	0.182	Inuit group (Siarnaq)	2023	2025	Ashton et al.
XXV	‡Mundilfari	/mʊndəlˈværi/		14.5	≈ 7	≈ 0.27	18588200	−946.29	167.1	0.211	Norse group (Mundilfari)	2000	2000	Gladman et al.
	‡S/2006 S 26	―		16.5	≈ 3	≈ 0.014	18619300	−948.67	171.9	0.248	Norse group (Mundilfari)	2006	2025	Sheppard et al.
	‡S/2019 S 33	―		16.3	≈ 4	≈ 0.034	18696100	−954.53	170.4	0.289	Norse group (Mundilfari)	2019	2025	Ashton et al.
	‡S/2006 S 1	—		15.7	≈ 5	≈ 0.065	18746300	−958.32	156.1	0.105	Norse group (Kari)	2006	2006	Sheppard et al.
	‡S/2023 S 23	―		16.4	≈ 3	≈ 0.014	18783700	−961.22	164.8	0.350	Norse group (Mundilfari)	2023	2025	Ashton et al.
	‡S/2020 S 21	―		16.7	≈ 3	≈ 0.014	18862100	−967.26	169.9	0.307	Norse group (Mundilfari)	2020	2025	Ashton et al.
	‡S/2020 S 46	―		16.8	≈ 3	≈ 0.014	18892100	−969.60	167.3	0.207	Norse group (Mundilfari)	2020	2026	Ashton et al.
	‡S/2004 S 43	—		16.3	≈ 4	≈ 0.034	18935700	−972.85	171.1	0.432	Norse group (Mundilfari)	2004	2023	Sheppard et al.
	‡S/2006 S 10	—		16.4	≈ 3	≈ 0.014	18979900	−976.34	161.6	0.151	Norse group (Mundilfari)	2006	2023	Sheppard et al.
	‡S/2019 S 5	—		16.7	≈ 3	≈ 0.014	19090100	−984.87	158.8	0.216	Norse group (Mundilfari)	2019	2023	Ashton et al.
	‡S/2023 S 25	―		17.0	≈ 3	≈ 0.014	19136600	−988.53	166.4	0.281	Norse group (Mundilfari)	2023	2025	Ashton et al.
	‡S/2004 S 59	―		16.4	≈ 3	≈ 0.014	19170700	−991.18	167.3	0.262	Norse group (Mundilfari)	2004	2025	Sheppard et al.
	‡S/2006 S 27	―		16.3	≈ 4	≈ 0.034	19205700	−993.79	170.5	0.140	Norse group (Mundilfari)	2006	2025	Sheppard et al.
LIV	‡Gridr	/ˈɡriːðər/		15.8	≈ 4	≈ 0.065	19250600	−997.33	163.9	0.187	Norse group (Mundilfari)	2004	2019	Sheppard et al.
XXXVIII	‡Bergelmir	/bɛərˈjɛlmɪər/		15.2	≈ 5	≈ 0.11	19268100	−998.62	158.8	0.145	Norse group (Mundilfari)	2004	2005	Sheppard et al.
L	‡Jarnsaxa	/jɑːrnˈsæksə/		15.6	≈ 6	≈ 0.065	19273500	−999.13	163.0	0.218	Norse group (Mundilfari)	2006	2006	Sheppard et al.
XXXI	‡Narvi	/ˈnɑːrvi/		14.5	≈ 7	≈ 0.27	19285000	−999.94	142.2	0.441	Norse group (low-inclination)	2003	2003	Sheppard et al.
	‡S/2023 S 44	―		16.6	≈ 3	≈ 0.014	19292400	−1000.47	167.4	0.434	Norse group (Mundilfari)	2023	2025	Ashton et al.
XXIII	‡Suttungr	/ˈsʊtʊŋɡər/		14.5	≈ 7	≈ 0.27	19391900	−1008.25	175.7	0.116	Norse group (Phoebe)	2000	2000	Gladman et al.
	‡S/2020 S 22	―		16.6	≈ 3	≈ 0.014	19443000	−1012.24	161.3	0.059	Norse group (Mundilfari)	2020	2025	Ashton et al.
	‡S/2004 S 44	—		15.8	≈ 5	≈ 0.065	19515400	−1017.91	167.7	0.129	Norse group (Mundilfari)	2004	2023	Sheppard et al.
	‡S/2004 S 60	―		16.5	≈ 3	≈ 0.014	19517000	−1018.13	173.8	0.280	Norse group (Phoebe)	2004	2025	Sheppard et al.
	♣S/2006 S 12	—		16.2	≈ 4	≈ 0.034	19570300	+1022.29	38.6	0.542	Gallic group (Note: Sheppard et al. suggested in 2023 that the moon's identification with the Gallic group is uncertain, but a later study from Ashton et al. considers it confidently Gallic and associated with Albiorix, unlike S/2004 S 24.)	2006	2023	Sheppard et al.
	‡S/2007 S 3	—		15.7	≈ 5	≈ 0.065	19614400	−1025.70	173.8	0.150	Norse group (Phoebe)	2007	2007	Sheppard et al.
	‡S/2004 S 45	—		16.0	≈ 4	≈ 0.034	19693700	−1031.86	154.0	0.551	Norse group (Kari)	2004	2023	Sheppard et al.
XLIII	‡Hati	/ˈhɑːti/		15.4	≈ 5	≈ 0.11	19695000	−1032.02	165.4	0.372	Norse group (Mundilfari)	2004	2005	Sheppard et al.
	‡S/2004 S 17	—		16.0	≈ 4	≈ 0.034	19699000	−1032.37	167.9	0.162	Norse group (Mundilfari)	2004	2005	Sheppard et al.
	‡S/2006 S 11	—		16.5	≈ 3	≈ 0.014	19711900	−1033.35	174.1	0.143	Norse group (Phoebe)	2004	2023	Sheppard et al.
	‡S/2004 S 12	—		15.9	≈ 4	≈ 0.034	19801000	−1040.39	164.7	0.337	Norse group (Mundilfari)	2004	2005	Sheppard et al.
	‡S/2020 S 23	―		16.6	≈ 3	≈ 0.014	19801500	−1040.38	165.0	0.089	Norse group (Mundilfari)	2020	2025	Ashton et al.
	‡S/2023 S 27	―		16.5	≈ 3	≈ 0.014	19820100	−1041.85	151.1	0.652	Norse group (low-inclination)	2023	2025	Ashton et al.
LIX	‡Eggther	/ˈɛɡθɛər/		15.4	≈ 6	≈ 0.11	19844600	−1043.80	165.0	0.157	Norse group (Mundilfari)	2004	2019	Sheppard et al.
	‡S/2023 S 28	―		16.9	≈ 3	≈ 0.014	19881000	−1046.56	168.7	0.575	Norse group (Mundilfari)	2023	2025	Ashton et al.
	‡S/2023 S 37	―		16.9	≈ 3	≈ 0.014	19889800	−1047.39	172.3	0.215	Norse group (Phoebe)	2023	2025	Ashton et al.
	‡S/2023 S 26	―		16.9	≈ 3	≈ 0.014	19894300	−1047.76	163.9	0.306	Norse group (Mundilfari)	2023	2025	Ashton et al.
	‡S/2019 S 36	―		16.8	≈ 3	≈ 0.014	19903200	−1048.42	166.9	0.161	Norse group (Mundilfari)	2019	2025	Ashton et al.
	‡S/2006 S 13	—		16.1	≈ 4	≈ 0.034	19953300	−1052.32	162.0	0.313	Norse group (Mundilfari)	2006	2023	Sheppard et al.
	‡S/2019 S 37	―		16.7	≈ 3	≈ 0.014	19996900	−1055.78	149.9	0.404	Norse group (low-inclination)	2019	2025	Ashton et al.
	‡S/2023 S 48	―		16.6	≈ 3	≈ 0.014	20029200	−1058.35	169.7	0.022	Norse group (Mundilfari)	2023	2025	Ashton et al.
	‡S/2023 S 29	―		16.7	≈ 3	≈ 0.014	20042400	−1059.42	172.2	0.141	Norse group (Phoebe)	2023	2025	Ashton et al.
	‡S/2023 S 59	―		16.9	≈ 2	≈ 0.004	20064000	−1061.04	169.5	0.467	Norse group (Mundilfari)	2023	2026	Ashton et al.
	‡S/2007 S 9	—		16.1	≈ 4	≈ 0.034	20174600	−1069.81	159.3	0.360	Norse group (Mundilfari)	2007	2023	Sheppard et al.
	‡S/2019 S 7	—		16.3	≈ 4	≈ 0.034	20185100	−1070.80	174.2	0.233	Norse group (Phoebe)	2019	2023	Ashton et al.
	‡S/2019 S 8	—		16.3	≈ 4	≈ 0.034	20287400	−1078.86	172.8	0.311	Norse group (Phoebe)	2019	2023	Ashton et al.
XL	‡Farbauti	/fɑːrˈbaʊti/		15.8	≈ 5	≈ 0.065	20290700	−1079.12	156.2	0.249	Norse group (Kari)	2004	2005	Sheppard et al.
XXX	‡Thrymr	/ˈθrɪmər/		14.3	≈ 8	≈ 0.38	20330500	−1082.23	175.0	0.467	Norse group (Phoebe)	2000	2000	Gladman et al.
XXXIX	‡Bestla	/ˈbɛstlə/		14.6	≈ 7	≈ 0.27	20337800	−1082.94	138.3	0.486	Norse group (low-inclination)	2004	2005	Sheppard et al.
	‡S/2019 S 9	—		16.3	≈ 4	≈ 0.034	20359700	−1084.62	159.5	0.433	Norse group (Mundilfari)	2019	2023	Ashton et al.
	‡S/2023 S 32	―		17.2	≈ 2	≈ 0.004	20454400	−1092.24	169.8	0.037	Norse group (Mundilfari)	2023	2025	Ashton et al.
	‡S/2004 S 46	—		16.4	≈ 3	≈ 0.014	20513800	−1096.99	177.2	0.249	Norse group (Phoebe)	2004	2023	Sheppard et al.
	‡S/2023 S 57	―		17.2	≈ 2	≈ 0.004	20536100	−1098.83	168.0	0.245	Norse group (Mundilfari)	2023	2026	Ashton et al.
LV	‡Angrboda	/ˈɑːŋɡərboʊðə/		16.1	≈ 4	≈ 0.034	20591500	−1103.20	177.7	0.216	Norse group (Phoebe)	2004	2019	Sheppard et al.
	‡S/2020 S 24	―		16.8	≈ 3	≈ 0.014	20618300	−1105.41	159.6	0.230	Norse group (Mundilfari)	2020	2025	Ashton et al.
	‡S/2019 S 11	—		16.3	≈ 4	≈ 0.034	20664200	−1109.11	144.6	0.513	Norse group (low-inclination)	2019	2023	Ashton et al.
XXXVI	‡Aegir	/ˈaɪ.ɪər/		15.5	≈ 6	≈ 0.065	20664400	−1109.13	166.1	0.255	Norse group (Mundilfari)	2004	2005	Sheppard et al.
	‡S/2019 S 10	—		16.7	≈ 3	≈ 0.014	20700300	−1111.99	163.9	0.248	Norse group (Mundilfari)	2019	2023	Ashton et al.
LXI	‡Beli	/ˈbeɪli/		16.1	≈ 4	≈ 0.034	20703700	−1112.27	158.9	0.087	Norse group (Mundilfari)	2004	2019	Sheppard et al.
	‡S/2023 S 31	―		17.0	≈ 3	≈ 0.014	20729200	−1114.29	163.0	0.182	Norse group (Mundilfari)	2023	2025	Ashton et al.
	‡S/2020 S 25	―		17.0	≈ 3	≈ 0.014	20763700	−1117.09	171.8	0.316	Norse group (Mundilfari)	2020	2025	Ashton et al.
	‡S/2023 S 34	―		16.6	≈ 3	≈ 0.014	20803900	−1120.38	168.4	0.570	Norse group (Mundilfari)	2023	2025	Ashton et al.
	‡S/2023 S 39	―		16.8	≈ 3	≈ 0.014	20824500	−1121.99	164.8	0.124	Norse group (Mundilfari)	2023	2025	Ashton et al.
	‡S/2019 S 12	—		16.3	≈ 4	≈ 0.034	20895000	−1127.60	167.1	0.476	Norse group (Mundilfari)	2019	2023	Ashton et al.
LVII	‡Gerd	/ˈjɛərð/		15.9	≈ 4	≈ 0.034	20947500	−1131.91	174.4	0.517	Norse group (Phoebe)	2004	2019	Sheppard et al.
	‡S/2019 S 13	—		16.7	≈ 3	≈ 0.014	20964500	−1133.27	177.3	0.318	Norse group (Phoebe)	2019	2023	Ashton et al.
	‡S/2004 S 61	―		16.3	≈ 4	≈ 0.034	20986900	−1135.06	168.4	0.466	Norse group (Mundilfari)	2004	2025	Sheppard et al.
	‡S/2006 S 14	—		16.5	≈ 3	≈ 0.014	21062300	−1141.27	166.7	0.060	Norse group (Mundilfari)	2006	2023	Sheppard et al.
	‡S/2023 S 40	―		16.9	≈ 3	≈ 0.014	21065100	−1141.48	169.6	0.342	Norse group (Mundilfari)	2023	2025	Ashton et al.
LXII	‡Gunnlod	/ˈɡʊnlɒð/		15.7	≈ 4	≈ 0.065	21141800	−1147.74	160.4	0.251	Norse group (Mundilfari)	2004	2019	Sheppard et al.
	‡S/2019 S 15	—		16.6	≈ 3	≈ 0.014	21191100	−1151.66	157.8	0.257	Norse group (Mundilfari)	2019	2023	Ashton et al.
	‡S/2020 S 6	—		16.6	≈ 3	≈ 0.014	21253300	−1156.81	166.9	0.480	Norse group (Mundilfari)	2020	2023	Ashton et al.
	‡S/2020 S 26	―		16.6	≈ 3	≈ 0.014	21264400	−1157.77	163.2	0.273	Norse group (Mundilfari)	2020	2025	Ashton et al.
	‡S/2023 S 41	―		16.7	≈ 3	≈ 0.014	21286400	−1159.52	172.1	0.279	Norse group (Phoebe)	2023	2025	Ashton et al.
LXVII	‡S/2004 S 7	—		15.5	≈ 5	≈ 0.065	21327600	−1162.93	164.8	0.511	Norse group (Mundilfari)	2004	2005	Sheppard et al.
	‡S/2006 S 3	—		15.7	≈ 5	≈ 0.065	21353100	−1165.02	156.1	0.432	Norse group (Kari)	2006	2006	Sheppard et al.
	‡S/2005 S 5	—		16.4	≈ 3	≈ 0.014	21364900	−1165.96	169.5	0.588	Norse group (Mundilfari)	2005	2023	Sheppard et al.
	‡S/2020 S 47	―		16.7	≈ 3	≈ 0.014	21397400	−1168.58	146.1	0.564	Norse group (low-inclination)	2020	2026	Ashton et al.
LVI	‡Skrymir	/ˈskrɪmɪər/		15.5	≈ 4	≈ 0.065	21447400	−1172.72	175.6	0.437	Norse group (Phoebe)	2004	2019	Sheppard et al.
	‡S/2023 S 33	―		16.8	≈ 3	≈ 0.014	21621900	−1187.07	155.8	0.665	Norse group (Kari)	2023	2025	Ashton et al.
	‡S/2006 S 16	—		16.5	≈ 3	≈ 0.014	21721200	−1195.13	164.1	0.204	Norse group (Mundilfari)	2006	2023	Sheppard et al.
	‡S/2023 S 49	―		16.7	≈ 3	≈ 0.014	21766500	−1198.99	171.7	0.026	Norse group (Mundilfari)	2023	2025	Ashton et al.
	‡S/2020 S 30	―		16.7	≈ 3	≈ 0.014	21790700	−1201.02	154.2	0.601	Norse group (Kari)	2020	2025	Ashton et al.
	‡S/2006 S 15	—		16.2	≈ 4	≈ 0.034	21799600	−1201.69	161.1	0.117	Norse group (Mundilfari)	2006	2023	Sheppard et al.
	‡S/2020 S 27	―		16.4	≈ 3	≈ 0.014	21802300	−1202.02	145.3	0.255	Norse group (low-inclination)	2020	2025	Ashton et al.
	‡S/2023 S 42	―		16.7	≈ 3	≈ 0.014	21837000	−1204.81	166.7	0.059	Norse group (Mundilfari)	2023	2025	Ashton et al.
	‡S/2004 S 28	—		15.8	≈ 5	≈ 0.065	21865900	−1207.18	167.9	0.159	Norse group (Mundilfari)	2004	2019	Sheppard et al.
	‡S/2020 S 32	―		16.7	≈ 3	≈ 0.014	21884100	−1208.85	169.1	0.502	Norse group (Mundilfari)	2020	2025	Ashton et al.
	‡S/2006 S 28	―		16.3	≈ 4	≈ 0.034	21955100	−1214.53	172.9	0.210	Norse group (Phoebe)	2006	2025	Sheppard et al.
	‡S/2020 S 8	—		16.4	≈ 3	≈ 0.014	21967200	−1215.61	161.8	0.252	Norse group (Mundilfari)	2020	2023	Ashton et al.
	‡S/2020 S 28	―		16.7	≈ 3	≈ 0.014	21993700	−1217.81	160.1	0.474	Norse group (Mundilfari)	2020	2025	Ashton et al.
LXV	‡Alvaldi	/ɔːlˈvɔːldi/		15.6	≈ 6	≈ 0.065	21993800	−1217.80	177.4	0.238	Norse group (Phoebe)	2004	2019	Sheppard et al.
	‡S/2019 S 38	―		16.7	≈ 3	≈ 0.014	21998400	−1218.27	163.0	0.399	Norse group (Mundilfari)	2019	2025	Ashton et al.
XLV	‡Kari	/ˈkɑːri/		14.5	≈ 6	≈ 0.27	22032100	−1220.98	153.0	0.469	Norse group (Kari)	2006	2006	Sheppard et al.
	‡S/2004 S 48	—		16.0	≈ 4	≈ 0.034	22137400	−1229.86	161.9	0.374	Norse group (Mundilfari)	2004	2023	Sheppard et al.
	‡S/2023 S 36	―		16.8	≈ 3	≈ 0.014	22230600	−1237.61	166.3	0.359	Norse group (Mundilfari)	2023	2025	Ashton et al.
LXVI	‡Geirrod	/ˈjeɪrɒd/		15.9	≈ 4	≈ 0.034	22259400	−1240.05	154.4	0.539	Norse group (Kari)	2004	2019	Sheppard et al.
	‡S/2023 S 35	―		16.8	≈ 3	≈ 0.014	22269700	−1240.76	168.5	0.151	Norse group (Mundilfari)	2023	2025	Ashton et al.
	‡S/2020 S 29	―		16.8	≈ 3	≈ 0.014	22301400	−1243.45	169.1	0.047	Norse group (Mundilfari)	2020	2025	Ashton et al.
XLI	‡Fenrir	/ˈfɛnrɪər/		15.8	≈ 4	≈ 0.034	22330800	−1245.92	164.5	0.137	Norse group (Mundilfari)	2004	2005	Sheppard et al.
	‡S/2004 S 50	—		16.4	≈ 3	≈ 0.014	22345000	−1247.19	164.0	0.450	Norse group (Mundilfari)	2004	2023	Sheppard et al.
	‡S/2006 S 17	—		16.0	≈ 4	≈ 0.034	22384200	−1250.46	168.7	0.425	Norse group (Mundilfari)	2006	2023	Sheppard et al.
	‡S/2004 S 49	—		16.0	≈ 4	≈ 0.034	22399400	−1251.68	159.8	0.453	Norse group (Mundilfari)	2004	2023	Sheppard et al.
	‡S/2020 S 34	―		16.5	≈ 3	≈ 0.014	22435600	−1254.61	160.6	0.154	Norse group (Mundilfari)	2020	2025	Ashton et al.
	‡S/2020 S 31	―		16.5	≈ 3	≈ 0.014	22457300	−1256.50	163.8	0.238	Norse group (Mundilfari)	2020	2025	Ashton et al.
	‡S/2023 S 52	―		16.9	≈ 3	≈ 0.014	22528000	−1262.34	146.2	0.124	Norse group (low-inclination)	2023	2026	Ashton et al.
	‡S/2023 S 43	―		16.4	≈ 3	≈ 0.014	22563900	−1265.57	170.3	0.264	Norse group (Mundilfari)	2023	2025	Ashton et al.
	‡S/2019 S 17	—		15.9	≈ 4	≈ 0.034	22722700	−1278.96	155.5	0.546	Norse group (Kari)	2019	2023	Ashton et al.
XLVIII	‡Surtur	/ˈsɜːrtər/		15.7	≈ 6	≈ 0.065	22748000	−1281.14	168.4	0.448	Norse group (Mundilfari)	2006	2006	Sheppard et al.
	‡S/2006 S 18	—		16.1	≈ 4	≈ 0.034	22760600	−1282.09	169.5	0.131	Norse group (Mundilfari)	2006	2023	Sheppard et al.
	‡S/2020 S 36	―		16.6	≈ 3	≈ 0.014	22806200	−1286.03	168.8	0.336	Norse group (Mundilfari)	2020	2025	Ashton et al.
XLVI	‡Loge	/ˈlɔɪ.eɪ/		15.4	≈ 5	≈ 0.11	22919200	−1295.52	168.1	0.191	Norse group (Mundilfari)	2006	2006	Sheppard et al.
	‡S/2020 S 33	―		16.9	≈ 3	≈ 0.014	22922500	−1295.85	162.8	0.555	Norse group (Mundilfari)	2020	2025	Ashton et al.
XIX	‡Ymir	/ˈiːmɪər/		12.2	≈ 19	≈ 5.6	22955600	−1298.68	172.3	0.338	Norse group (Phoebe)	2000	2000	Gladman et al.
	‡S/2020 S 35	―		16.7	≈ 3	≈ 0.014	23030300	−1304.97	174.9	0.225	Norse group (Phoebe)	2020	2025	Ashton et al.
	‡S/2019 S 19	—		16.5	≈ 3	≈ 0.014	23044400	−1306.16	151.8	0.458	Norse group (Kari)	2019	2023	Ashton et al.
	‡S/2019 S 18	—		16.6	≈ 3	≈ 0.014	23139500	−1314.27	154.6	0.509	Norse group (Kari)	2019	2023	Ashton et al.
	‡S/2004 S 21	—		16.2	≈ 4	≈ 0.034	23160900	−1316.12	153.2	0.394	Norse group (Kari)	2004	2019	Sheppard et al.
	‡S/2004 S 39	—		16.1	≈ 4	≈ 0.034	23192400	−1318.74	165.9	0.100	Norse group (Mundilfari)	2004	2019	Sheppard et al.
	‡S/2019 S 16	—		16.7	≈ 3	≈ 0.014	23265200	−1324.95	162.0	0.250	Norse group (Mundilfari)	2019	2023	Ashton et al.
	‡S/2004 S 53	—		16.2	≈ 4	≈ 0.034	23279800	−1326.18	162.6	0.240	Norse group (Mundilfari)	2004	2023	Sheppard et al.
	♣S/2004 S 24	—		16.0	≈ 4	≈ 0.034	23338200	+1331.32	37.4	0.071	Gallic group (Note: The moon has a similar inclination, but a significantly larger semi-major axis. Therefore, it is uncertain whether it comes from the same parent body as the rest of the Gallic group.)	2004	2019	Sheppard et al.
	‡S/2004 S 36	—		16.2	≈ 4	≈ 0.034	23390800	−1335.80	153.3	0.625	Norse group (Kari)	2004	2019	Sheppard et al.
	‡S/2023 S 51	―		16.8	≈ 3	≈ 0.014	23431500	−1339.21	163.3	0.191	Norse group (Mundilfari)	2023	2026	Ashton et al.
	‡S/2023 S 45	―		16.9	≈ 3	≈ 0.014	23438400	−1339.85	157.4	0.633	Norse group (Mundilfari)	2023	2025	Ashton et al.
	‡S/2020 S 45	―		16.6	≈ 3	≈ 0.014	23507700	−1345.79	172.8	0.199	Norse group (Phoebe)	2020	2026	Ashton et al.
LXIII	‡Thiazzi	/θiˈætsi/		15.9	≈ 4	≈ 0.034	23577500	−1351.83	158.8	0.511	Norse group (Mundilfari)	2004	2019	Sheppard et al.
	‡S/2020 S 38	―		16.1	≈ 4	≈ 0.034	23583900	−1352.43	159.7	0.513	Norse group (Mundilfari)	2020	2025	Ashton et al.
	‡S/2019 S 20	—		16.7	≈ 3	≈ 0.014	23677900	−1360.47	156.0	0.354	Norse group (Kari)	2019	2023	Ashton et al.
	‡S/2020 S 37	―		16.6	≈ 3	≈ 0.014	23751800	−1366.82	174.8	0.344	Norse group (Phoebe)	2020	2025	Ashton et al.
	‡S/2019 S 39	―		16.7	≈ 3	≈ 0.014	23784500	−1369.64	174.5	0.098	Norse group (Phoebe)	2019	2025	Ashton et al.
	‡S/2020 S 40	―		16.6	≈ 3	≈ 0.014	23785900	−1369.76	167.3	0.412	Norse group (Mundilfari)	2020	2025	Ashton et al.
	‡S/2006 S 19	—		16.1	≈ 4	≈ 0.034	23800500	−1371.02	175.5	0.467	Norse group (Phoebe)	2006	2023	Sheppard et al.
	‡S/2019 S 40	―		16.6	≈ 3	≈ 0.014	24087800	−1395.88	161.8	0.088	Norse group (Mundilfari)	2019	2025	Ashton et al.
	‡S/2019 S 42	―		15.9	≈ 4	≈ 0.034	24111600	−1397.98	163.2	0.121	Norse group (Mundilfari)	2019	2025	Ashton et al.
LXIV	‡S/2004 S 34	—		16.1	≈ 4	≈ 0.034	24145800	−1400.93	168.3	0.279	Norse group (Mundilfari)	2004	2019	Sheppard et al.
	‡S/2020 S 39	―		16.7	≈ 3	≈ 0.014	24262400	−1411.15	160.1	0.305	Norse group (Mundilfari)	2020	2025	Ashton et al.
	‡S/2019 S 41	―		16.9	≈ 3	≈ 0.014	24493600	−1431.30	157.1	0.257	Norse group (Mundilfari)	2019	2025	Ashton et al.
	‡S/2023 S 46	―		16.8	≈ 3	≈ 0.014	24708900	−1450.27	143.2	0.336	Norse group (low-inclination)	2023	2025	Ashton et al.
XLII	‡Fornjot	/ˈfɔːrnjɒt/		14.7	≈ 6	≈ 0.11	24936800	−1470.36	170.0	0.213	Norse group (Mundilfari)	2004	2005	Sheppard et al.
	‡S/2023 S 47	―		17.0	≈ 3	≈ 0.014	25102300	−1485.04	162.5	0.101	Norse group (Mundilfari)	2023	2025	Ashton et al.
	‡S/2004 S 51	—		16.1	≈ 4	≈ 0.034	25207100	−1494.41	171.2	0.201	Norse group (Mundilfari)	2004	2023	Sheppard et al.
	‡S/2006 S 29	―		16.4	≈ 3	≈ 0.014	25212100	−1494.78	156.2	0.239	Norse group (Kari)	2006	2025	Sheppard et al.
	‡S/2020 S 10	—		16.9	≈ 3	≈ 0.014	25315300	−1503.97	165.6	0.296	Norse group (Mundilfari)	2020	2023	Ashton et al.
	‡S/2020 S 42	―		16.7	≈ 3	≈ 0.014	25329400	−1505.31	157.5	0.506	Norse group (Mundilfari)	2020	2025	Ashton et al.
	‡S/2020 S 9	—		16.0	≈ 4	≈ 0.034	25408700	−1512.38	161.4	0.531	Norse group (Mundilfari)	2020	2023	Ashton et al.
	‡S/2023 S 5	―		16.7	≈ 3	≈ 0.014	25583500	−1528.04	168.8	0.599	Norse group (Mundilfari)	2023	2025	Ashton et al.
	‡S/2020 S 41	―		16.6	≈ 3	≈ 0.014	25876400	−1554.40	160.2	0.402	Norse group (Mundilfari)	2020	2025	Ashton et al.
LVIII	‡S/2004 S 26	—		15.7	≈ 5	≈ 0.065	26097500	−1574.25	172.9	0.147	Norse group (Phoebe)	2004	2019	Sheppard et al.
	‡S/2019 S 21	—		16.2	≈ 4	≈ 0.034	26439500	−1605.28	171.9	0.155	Norse group (Mundilfari)	2019	2023	Ashton et al.
	‡S/2004 S 52	—		16.5	≈ 3	≈ 0.014	26446400	−1605.89	165.4	0.291	Norse group (Mundilfari)	2004	2023	Sheppard et al.
	‡S/2020 S 43	―		16.9	≈ 3	≈ 0.014	26657400	−1625.29	164.6	0.203	Norse group (Mundilfari)	2020	2025	Ashton et al.
	‡S/2019 S 43	―		16.5	≈ 3	≈ 0.014	26664100	−1625.90	165.3	0.277	Norse group (Mundilfari)	2019	2025	Ashton et al.
	‡S/2019 S 44	―		16.4	≈ 3	≈ 0.014	26796900	−1638.11	172.6	0.512	Norse group (Phoebe)	2019	2025	Ashton et al.
	‡S/2020 S 44	―		16.8	≈ 3	≈ 0.014	27259400	−1680.64	168.5	0.199	Norse group (Mundilfari)	2020	2025	Ashton et al.

== Other objects ==
=== Ring moonlets ===
Also existing in Saturn's ring system are moonlets: objects generally too small to be treated as moons or directly imaged, and usually short-lived or transient bodies.

During late July 2009, a moonlet, S/2009 S 1, was discovered in the B Ring, 480 km from the outer edge of the ring, by the shadow it cast. It is estimated to be 300 m in diameter. Unlike the A Ring moonlets, it does not induce a 'propeller' feature, probably due to the density of the B Ring. Another B ring object, S/2009 S 2, was reported by Joseph Spitale and the Minor Planet Center on 17 June 2026. Although the Minor Planet Center and NASA's Jet Propulsion Laboratory both count S/2009 S 2 as a moon of Saturn, Spitale and his colleagues consider the object's nature ambiguous. S/2009 S 2 appears to be embedded in an elongated feature with an approximate length of 15 km (9.3 mi) toward Saturn and away from the Sun, which may be either an impact plume or a propeller feature produced by a much smaller moonlet.

In 2006, four tiny moonlets were found in Cassini images of the A Ring. Before this discovery only two larger moons had been known within gaps in the A Ring, Pan and Daphnis, which are large enough to clear continuous gaps in the ring. In contrast, a moonlet is only massive enough to clear two small—about 10 km across—partial gaps in the immediate vicinity of the moonlet itself creating a structure shaped like an airplane propeller. The moonlets themselves are tiny, ranging from about 40 to 500 meters in diameter, and are too small to be seen directly.

In 2007, the discovery of 150 more moonlets revealed that they (with the exception of two that have been seen outside the Encke gap) are confined to three narrow bands in the A Ring between 126,750 and 132,000 km from Saturn's center. Each band is about a thousand kilometers wide, which is less than 1% the width of Saturn's rings. This region is relatively free from the disturbances caused by resonances with larger satellites, although other areas of the A Ring without disturbances are apparently free of moonlets. The moonlets were probably formed from the breakup of a larger satellite. It is estimated that the A Ring contains 7,000–8,000 propellers larger than 0.8 km in size and millions larger than 0.25 km. In April 2014, NASA scientists reported the possible consolidation of a new moon within the A Ring, implying that Saturn's present moons may have formed in a similar process in the past when Saturn's ring system was much more massive.

Similar moonlets may reside in the F Ring. They have not been confirmed as solid bodies; it is not yet clear if these are real satellites or merely persistent clumps within the F Ring. There, "jets" of material may be due to collisions, initiated by perturbations from the nearby small moon Prometheus, of these moonlets with the core of the F Ring. One of the largest F Ring moonlets may be the as-yet unconfirmed object S/2004 S 6. The F Ring also contains transient "fans" which are thought to result from even smaller moonlets, about 1 km in diameter, orbiting near the F Ring core.

The following is a table of selected moonlets observed by Cassini, including unconfirmed bodies.

Name	Image	Diameter (km)	Semi-major axis (km)	Orbital period (d)	Position	Discovery year	Status
A Ring moonlets	A noisy image showing a few bright dots marked by circles	0.04–0.4	≈ 130000	≈ +0.55	Three 1,000 km bands within A Ring	2006	—
S/2004 S 3 and S 4		≈ 3–5	≈ 140300	≈ +0.619	uncertain objects around the F Ring	2004	Were undetected in thorough imaging of the region in November 2004, making their existence improbable. S/2004 S 4 was most likely a transient clump—it has not been recovered since the first sighting.
S/2004 S 6	A bright narrow band runs from the top to bottom. To the right of it in the diffuse halo the is a bright small object.	≈ 3–5	≈ 140130	+0.61801	uncertain objects around the F Ring	2004	Consistently detected into 2005, may be surrounded by fine dust and have a very small physical core

=== Spurious ===
Two moons were claimed to be discovered by different astronomers but never seen again. Both moons were said to orbit between Titan and Hyperion.

- Chiron which was supposedly sighted by Hermann Goldschmidt in 1861, but never observed by anyone else.
- Themis was allegedly discovered in 1905 by astronomer William Pickering, but never seen again. Nevertheless, it was included in numerous almanacs and astronomy books until the 1960s.

=== Hypothetical ===
In 2022, scientists of the Massachusetts Institute of Technology proposed the hypothetical former moon Chrysalis, using data from the Cassini–Huygens mission. Chrysalis would have orbited between Titan and Iapetus, but its orbit would have gradually become more eccentric until it was torn apart by Saturn. 99% of its mass would have been absorbed by Saturn, while the remaining 1% would have formed Saturn's rings.

=== Temporary ===
Much like Jupiter, asteroids and comets will infrequently make close approaches to Saturn, even more infrequently becoming captured into orbit of the planet. The comet P/2020 F1 (Leonard) is calculated to have made a close approach of 978000±65000 km (608000±40000 mi) to Saturn on 8 May 1936, closer than the orbit of Titan to the planet, with an orbital eccentricity of only 1.098±0.007. The comet may have been orbiting Saturn prior to this as a temporary satellite, but difficulty modelling the non-gravitational forces makes whether or not it was indeed a temporary satellite uncertain.

Other comets and asteroids may have temporarily orbited Saturn at some point, but none are presently known to have.

== See also ==
- List of natural satellites
