= Outline of Saturn =

Overview of and topical guide to Saturn

The following outline is provided as an overview of and topical guide to Saturn:

Saturn – sixth planet from the Sun and the second-largest in the Solar System, after Jupiter. It is a gas giant with an average radius about nine times that of Earth. Although only one-eighth the average density of Earth, with its larger volume Saturn is just over 95 times more massive. Saturn is named after the Roman god of agriculture; its astronomical symbol (♄) represents the god's sickle.

== Classification of Saturn ==
- Astronomical object
  - Gravitationally rounded object
    - Planet
      - Giant planet
        - Gas giant
      - Planet of the Solar System
        - Outer planet
        - Superior planet

== Location of Saturn ==
- Milky Way Galaxy – barred spiral galaxy
  - Orion Arm – a spiral arm of the Milky Way
    - Solar System – the Sun and the objects that orbit it, including 8 planets, the sixth planet from the Sun being Saturn
      - Orbit of Saturn

== Movement of Saturn ==
- Orbit of Saturn
- Rotation of Saturn

== Features of Saturn ==
- Great White Spot
- Magnetosphere of Saturn
- Rings
- Dragon Storm

== Natural satellites of Saturn ==
- Moons of Saturn

=== Ring moonlets of Saturn ===
- S/2009 S 1
- S/2009 S 2
- Pan
- Daphnis
- Atlas
- Prometheus
- Pandora
- Aegaeon

=== Co-orbital moons of Saturn ===
- Janus
- Epimetheus

=== Inner large moons of Saturn ===
- Mimas
  - Geological features on Mimas
- Enceladus
  - Geological features on Enceladus
    - Tiger Stripes on Enceladus
    - Quadrangles on Enceladus
- Tethys
  - Geological features on Tethys
    - Quadrangles on Tethys
- Dione
  - Geological features on Dione
    - Quadrangles on Dione

=== Alkyonides group of moons of Saturn ===
- Methone
- Anthe
- Pallene

=== Trojan moons of Saturn ===
- Telesto
- Calypso
- Helene
- Polydeuces

=== Outer large moons of Saturn ===
- Rhea
  - Rings of Rhea
  - Geological features on Rhea
    - Quadrangles on Rhea
- Titan
  - Atmosphere of Titan
  - Life on Titan
  - Geological features on Titan
    - Lakes of Titan
- Hyperion
  - Geological features on Hyperion
- Iapetus
  - Geological features on Iapetus

=== Inuit group of moons of Saturn ===
Saturn's Inuit group of satellites

- Kiviuq
- Ijiraq
- Paaliaq
- Siarnaq
- Tarqeq

=== Gallic group of moons of Saturn ===
Saturn's Gallic group of satellites

- Albiorix
- Bebhionn
- Erriapus
- Tarvos

=== Norse group of Saturn satellites ===
Saturn's Norse group of satellites

- Phoebe
- Skoll
- S/2004 S 13
- Greip
- Hyrrokkin
- Jarnsaxa
- Mundilfari
- S/2006 S 1
- S/2004 S 17
- Bergelmir
- Narvi
- Suttungr
- Hati
- S/2004 S 12
- Farbauti
- Thrymr
- Aegir
- S/2007 S 3
- Bestla
- Saturn LXVII
- S/2006 S 3
- Fenrir
- Surtur
- Kari
- Ymir
- Loge
- Fornjot

== History of Saturn ==
History of Saturn

== Exploration of Saturn ==
Exploration of Saturn

=== Flyby missions to explore Saturn ===
- Pioneer 11
- Voyager program
- Voyager 1
- Voyager 2

=== Direct missions to explore Saturn ===
- Cassini–Huygens
- Huygens

=== Proposed missions to explore Saturn ===
- Titan Saturn System Mission
- Titan Mare Explorer

== See also ==
- Outline of astronomy
  - Outline of the Solar System
- Outline of space exploration
