= Skathi (moon) =

Satellite of Saturn

- Discovery images of Skathi (circled) taken by the Canada–France–Hawaii Telescope in September 2000

Discovery
- Discovered by: Brett J. Gladman; JJ Kavelaars et al. (Note: The Jet Propulsion Laboratory's Solar System Dynamics page credits the discovery to Gladman and Kavelaars while the International Astronomical Union credits the team of astronomers involved in the survey.)
- Discovery site: Mauna Kea Observatory
- Discovery date: September 23, 2000

Designations
- Designation: Saturn XXVII
- Pronunciation: /ˈskɑːði/ (with the PASTA vowel) (Note: The 'a' vowel is actually transcribed as [a], a non-English vowel adopted into English as /æ/ in the UK and as /ɑː/ in the US. This is consistent with other Old Norse names in English such as Vanir."Vanir". Oxford English Dictionary (online ed.). Oxford University Press. (Subscription or participating institution membership required.))
- Named after: Skaði
- Alternative names: S/2000 S 8

Orbital characteristics
- Semi-major axis: 15541000 km
- Eccentricity: 0.270
- Orbital period (sidereal): −728.2 days
- Inclination: 152.6°
- Satellite of: Saturn
- Group: Norse group

Physical characteristics
- Mean diameter: 8+50% −30% km
- Synodic rotation period: 11.10±0.02 h
- Albedo: 0.06 (assumed)
- Apparent magnitude: 23.6
- Absolute magnitude (H): 14.3

Skathi, also named Saturn XXVII and originally spelled Skadi, is a natural satellite of the planet Saturn. Skathi is one of Saturn's irregular moons, in its Norse group of satellites. It was discovered on September 23, 2000, by a team of astronomers led by Brett Gladman. The team announced their discovery on December 7, 2000, along with seven other satellites of Saturn, namely; Tarvos, Ijiraq, Thrymr, Siarnaq, Mundilfari, Erriapus, and Suttungr. The moon was named after Skaði, a figure in Norse mythology, as part of an effort to diversify the largely Greek and Roman names of astronomical objects.

Skathi takes just over 725 days to complete an orbit of Saturn and it is estimated to take 11.10±0.02 hours to rotate on its axis. It orbits at a greater distance from Saturn than many of the planet's other satellites, with a large orbital inclination and eccentricity, and it moves in a retrograde direction. Not much is known about Skathi, because it is a dim object. Other than Earth-based observations, it has only been observed by the Cassini probe, and even those measurements were taken at a distance of nearly 9.7 million kilometres (6 million miles).

Skathi's origin remains an open question. One possibility is that it was originally an asteroid that formed elsewhere, and was captured by Saturn's gravity as it flew by the planet. Another possibility is that it was originally a portion of one of Saturn's moons, like Phoebe, that split off during a collision and became an independent satellite. Its physical composition has not been determined, but it is known to be about 8 kilometres (5 mi) across, and to have an irregular shape.

== Discovery ==
An animation of the three images that first depicted Skathi, taken on September 23, 2000.

Skathi was discovered on September 23, 2000, by Brett J. Gladman, JJ Kavelaars, Jean-Marc Petit, Hans Scholl, Matthew J. Holman, Brian G. Marsden, Phil Nicholson, and Joseph A. Burns. The team used images taken by the Canada–France–Hawaii Telescope at the Mauna Kea Observatories.

At first, Skathi was given the temporary name "S/2000 S 8": the first "S" denotes that Skathi is a satellite (as opposed to, say, a planetary ring), "2000" specifies that it was discovered in the year 2000, the second "S" is assigned because it orbits the planet Saturn, and the number 8 means that it was the eighth such object discovered in that year.

Skathi's name was specifically chosen to diversify the origins of names given to astronomical objects. Most English names for planets are derived from the Roman names for planets, and scientists who have named satellites have tended to follow this pattern. Given this context, the historian Jürgen Blunck wrote that Kavelaars "attempted to help astronomical nomenclature to find its way out of its Greco-Romano-Renaissance rut", attempting to assign the newly discovered satellites names "that were both multicultural and Canadian". For Skathi he selected a name from Norse mythology, in which Skaði is a giantess who traveled to Asgard to avenge the death of her father. Several of Saturn's other satellites (Ijiraq, Kiviuq, Paaliaq, Siarnaq, and Tarqeq) were given names from Inuit mythology.

When the name of the moon was announced in 2003, it was given as "Skadi", using ⟨d⟩ as a graphical approximation of the Icelandic letter ⟨ð⟩ (eth). In 2005, the IAU Working Group on Planetary System Nomenclature instead decided to use the transliteration ⟨th⟩.

When Skathi was given its permanent name, it was also assigned the Roman numeral designation Saturn XXVII.

== Orbit and rotation ==
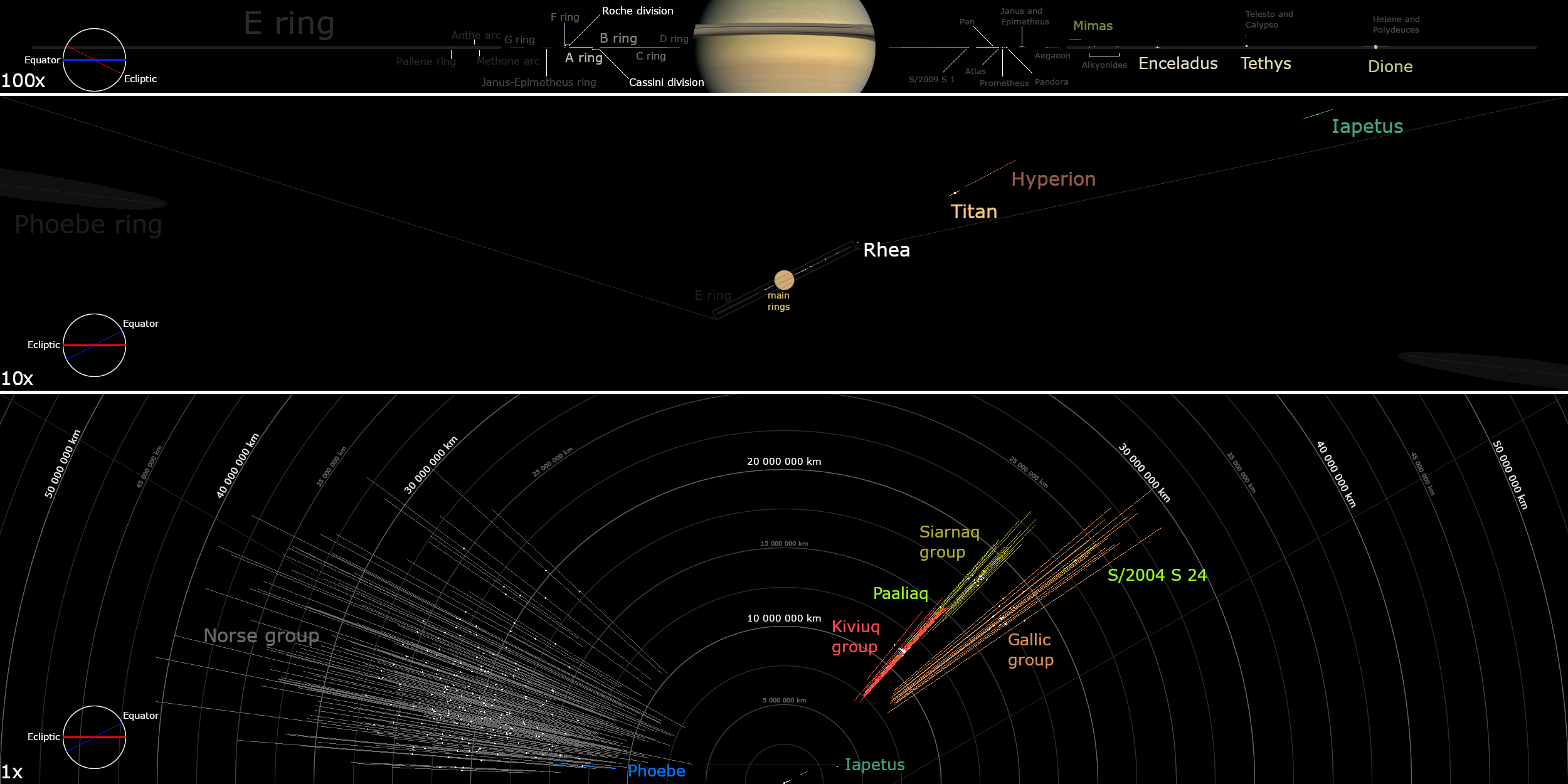
A diagram of Saturn's moons showing orbital distances and inclinations. Skathi is included in the Norse group, colored in gray.

All of the members of Saturn's Norse group of satellites, including Skathi, have a retrograde orbit, meaning that they orbit in the opposite direction of Saturn's orbit. It takes more than 725 days to complete one orbit around Saturn, and it does so at an average distance of 15,576,000 kilometres (9,678,000 mi). An orbital period of just over two years is fast for an irregular satellite of Saturn, and Skathi completes an orbit faster than any other named retrograde moon of Saturn except Phoebe. Its orbital inclination, which represents how slanted its orbit is, is 149° compared to the ecliptic (the plane on which most objects orbit the Sun) and 150° compared to Saturn's equator. This means that it orbits at a sharp angle compared to most objects in the Solar System. Skathi also has an orbital eccentricity of 0.246. A circular orbit has a value of zero; Skathi's orbit is more elliptical than the orbit of many objects in the Solar System, such as Earth's, which has an eccentricity of 0.017.

Skathi's rotation period was initially estimated to be between 11 and 12 hours. As of 2019, the most precise measurements were those taken by the Cassini probe, which identified the time taken for Skathi to revolve around its axis of rotation at 11.10±0.02 hours.

== Physical characteristics ==
Skathi was first identified by Earth-based observations, and much of the information about Skathi's features and composition comes from observations taken from Earth. The Cassini probe also observed Skathi on eight occasions between March 2011 and August 2016. However, these observations were conducted during a flyby at a distance of nearly 9.7 million kilometres (6 million miles); even in these observations, Skathi was just a dim point of light.

It has an apparent optical magnitude of 23.6 from Earth, and an absolute visual magnitude of about 14, so it is much less bright from Earth than many hundreds of thousands of objects outside the Solar System. From Earth, it appears close to the much brighter object that it orbits, Saturn, and is assumed to have a low surface albedo of about 0.06.

Observations by Cassini suggest that Skathi is about 8 kilometres (5 miles) in diameter. The amount of light that Skathi reflects varies substantially as it rotates, which implies that it is an irregularly shaped object. Its spectral slope of +5.2%/100 nm indicates a reddish surface, similar to the Gallic group moons Erriapus and Tarvos.

Many of Saturn's moons are composed of water ice and rock, but Skathi's chemical composition has not been determined, and it may have different physical composition than Saturn's other moons (particularly because it may not have originated in the vicinity of Saturn). The density of Skathi is also not known, but Saturnian irregular satellites are typically not dense, below 1 gram per cubic centimetre, and low densities are thought to characterize most of these objects.

== Origin ==
There has been active debate on the origin of Skathi and Saturn's other irregular satellites, prompted by how different their orbits are compared to other satellites of Saturn and of the sun. The planets and satellites of a planetary system are thought to usually form by accreting together out of objects in a protoplanetary disk. Because the particles in any part of a protoplanetary disk usually move in similar directions and at similar speeds, a moon that formed from a merger of these particles should have a fairly circular, prograde orbit, approximately on the plane of the protoplanetary disk. But Skathi's irregular orbit, like the other natural satellites of Saturn that share similarly irregular orbits, has prompted alternative speculations about its origin.

One possibility is that Skathi originally formed somewhere other than in the vicinity of Saturn, and then began to travel through space before being captured by the planet. However, it is also possible that Skathi is a piece of debris that was knocked off of one of Saturn's other moons, during a collision with another object. Because orbits can be extremely chaotic and sensitive to initial conditions, it is possible that some types of collisions could produce an extremely irregular orbit like Skathi's, although these orbits are usually not stable over very long timescales.

== See also ==
- Norse group
