= Hati (moon) =

Moon of Saturn

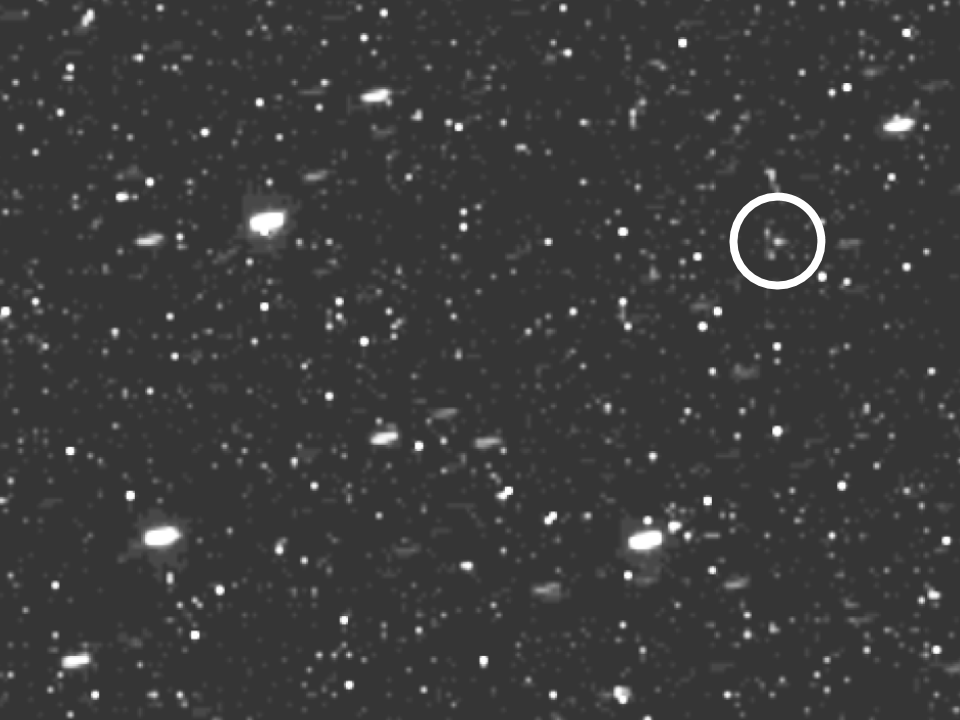
- Hati imaged by the Cassini spacecraft in November 2015

Discovery
- Discovered by: Scott S. Sheppard; David C. Jewitt; Jan T. Kleyna; Brian G. Marsden
- Discovery date: December 2004

Designations
- Designation: Saturn XLIII
- Pronunciation: /ˈhɑːti/ (with the PASTA vowel)
- Named after: Hati Hróðvitnisson
- Alternative names: S/2004 S 14

Orbital characteristics
- Semi-major axis: 19697100 km
- Eccentricity: 0.375
- Orbital period (sidereal): −1040.29 days
- Inclination: 164.1°
- Satellite of: Saturn
- Group: Norse group

Physical characteristics
- Mean diameter: 5+50% −30% km
- Mean density: ≳0.5–0.7 g/cm^{3}
- Synodic rotation period: 5.45±0.04 h
- Albedo: 0.06 (assumed)
- Apparent magnitude: 24.4
- Absolute magnitude (H): 15.3

Hati or Saturn XLIII is a natural satellite of Saturn. Its discovery was announced by Scott S. Sheppard, David C. Jewitt, Jan Kleyna, and Brian G. Marsden on 4 May 2005, from observations taken between 12 December 2004 and 11 March 2005.

Hati is about 5 kilometers in diameter, and orbits Saturn at an average distance of 19,697 Mm in 1040 days, at an inclination of 164° to the ecliptic, in a retrograde direction and with an eccentricity of 0.375, somewhat similar to Mundilfari's orbit. In March 2013, the synodic rotational period was measured by Cassini to about 5.45±0.04 hours. This is the fastest known rotation of all of Saturn's moons, and in fact the fastest known among all moons (including asteroid moons) for which a rotation period has been reliably measured. Like Mundilfari, it is very elongated in shape.

It was named in April 2007 after Hati, a giant wolf from Norse mythology, son of Fenrisúlfr and twin brother of Sköll.
