= Fenrir (moon) =

Moon of Saturn

Discovery
- Discovery site: Subaru, Gemini; Jan T. Kleyna; Brian G. Marsden

Designations
- Designation: Saturn XLI
- Pronunciation: /ˈfɛnrɪər/ or /ˈfɛnrər/
- Named after: Fenrir
- Alternative names: S/2004 S 16
- Adjectives: Fenrian /ˈfɛnriən/ (Note: The oblique stem of the name is Fenri, as in Fenrisulfr. The -r is the nominative case ending.)

Orbital characteristics
- Semi-major axis: 22 454 000 km
- Eccentricity: 0.1363
- Orbital period (sidereal): 1260.35 d (3.45 yr)
- Mean anomaly: 146.614°
- Inclination: 164.955°
- Longitude of ascending node: 330.95°
- Argument of perihelion: 120.264°
- Satellite of: Saturn
- Group: Norse group

Physical characteristics
- Mean diameter: 4 km
- Albedo: 0.06 (assumed)
- Apparent magnitude: 25.0
- Absolute magnitude (H): 15.9

Fenrir /ˈfɛnrɪər/, or Saturn XLI (provisional designation S/2004 S 16), is a natural satellite of Saturn. Its discovery was announced by Scott S. Sheppard, David C. Jewitt, Jan Kleyna, and Brian G. Marsden on May 4, 2005, from observations taken between December 13, 2004, and March 5, 2005. Fenrir has an apparent magnitude of 25, making it one of the faintest known moons in the Solar System, and was discovered using some of the largest telescopes in the world. It is even too dark to have been observed by the Cassini spacecraft when it was in orbit around Saturn, for which it never got brighter than approximately 17th apparent magnitude. Fenrir was named after Fenrir, a giant wolf from Norse mythology, father of Hati and Skoll, son of Loki, destined to break its bonds for Ragnarök.

Fenrir is about 4 kilometres in diameter, and orbits Saturn at an average distance of 22,454 Mm in 1260 days, at an inclination of 163° to the ecliptic (143° to Saturn's equator) with an eccentricity of 0.136. The Fenrian orbit is retrograde: it orbits Saturn in a direction opposite to the planet's spin, suggesting that this irregular moon was captured by Saturn.
