= Fornjot (moon) =

Moon of saturn

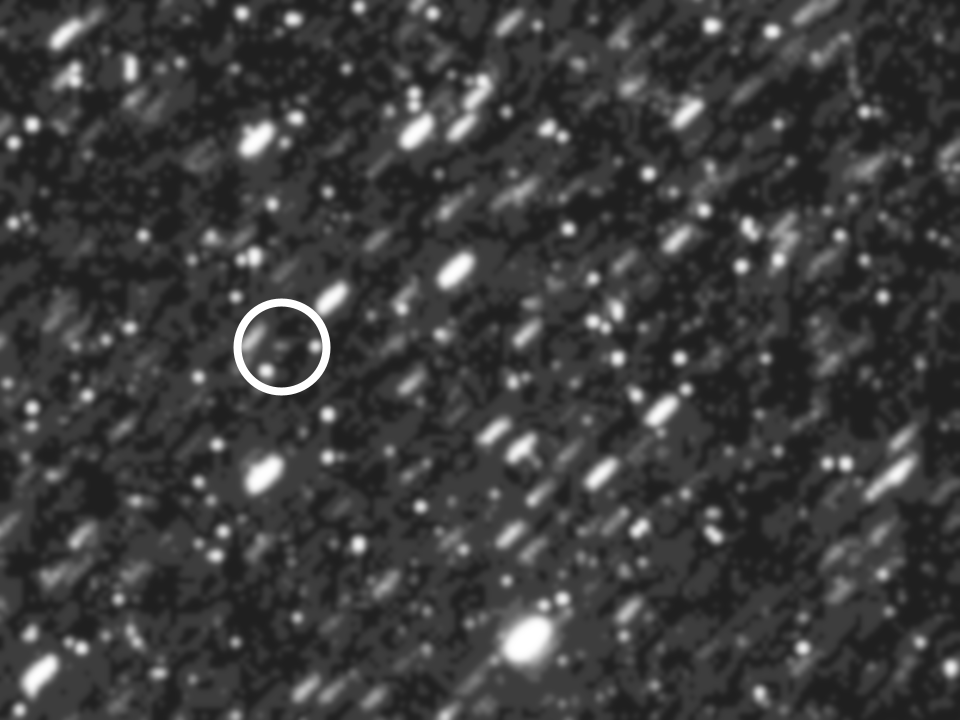
- Fornjot imaged by the Cassini spacecraft in March 2014

Discovery
- Discovered by: Scott S. Sheppard; David C. Jewitt; Jan T. Kleyna; Brian G. Marsden
- Discovery date: December 2004

Designations
- Designation: Saturn XLII
- Pronunciation: /ˈfɔːrnjoʊt/ Icelandic: [ˈfɔ(r)tnˌjouːt]
- Named after: Fornjót
- Alternative names: S/2004 S 8

Orbital characteristics
- Semi-major axis: 25108000 km
- Eccentricity: 0.206
- Orbital period (sidereal): −1490.9 days
- Inclination: 170.4°
- Satellite of: Saturn
- Group: Norse group

Physical characteristics
- Mean diameter: 6+50% −30% km
- Synodic rotation period: (6.9 or 9.5) ± 0.4? h
- Albedo: 0.06 (assumed)
- Spectral type: r – i = 0.20 ± 0.09
- Apparent magnitude: 24.6
- Absolute magnitude (H): 14.9

Fornjot /ˈfɔːrnjoʊt/ or Saturn XLII is the outermost named moon of Saturn. Its discovery was announced by Scott S. Sheppard, David C. Jewitt, Jan Kleyna, and Brian G. Marsden on 4 May 2005 from observations taken between 12 December 2004, and 11 March 2005. It had the largest semi-major axis among all the known moons of Saturn until the recovery of Saturn LVIII in 2019.

It is about 6 kilometres in diameter, and it orbits Saturn at an average distance of 23,609 Mm in 1491 d at an inclination of 168° to the ecliptic (160° to Saturn's equator) in a retrograde direction and with an eccentricity of 0.186. It is ambiguous whether the rotation period is 6.9 or 9.5±0.4 hours, but it is known to show very little variation in brightness and is probably very round in shape. It was also the faintest moon that was measured by Cassini–Huygens.

Fornjot was named after Fornjót, a giant in Norse mythology.
