= Skoll (moon) =

Moon of Saturn

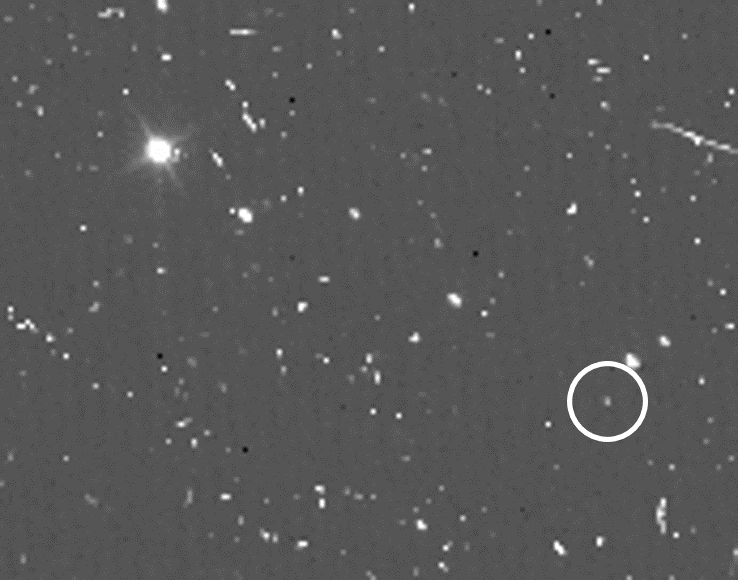
- Image of Skoll taken by Cassini on February 23, 2016

Discovery
- Discovered by: S. S. Sheppard; D. C. Jewitt; J. Kleyna
- Discovery date: 2006

Designations
- Designation: Saturn XLVII
- Pronunciation: English: /ˈskɒl/ Old Norse: [skœlː] (approximately /skɜːrl/)
- Named after: Sköll
- Alternative names: S/2006 S 8

Orbital characteristics
- Semi-major axis: 17560000 km
- Eccentricity: 0.418
- Orbital period (sidereal): 869 days (2.38 yr)
- Inclination: 156°
- Satellite of: Saturn
- Group: Norse group

Physical characteristics
- Mean diameter: 5+50% −30% km
- Synodic rotation period: 7.26±0.09? h
- Albedo: 0.06 (assumed)
- Spectral type: r – i = 0.36 ± 0.08
- Apparent magnitude: 24.5
- Absolute magnitude (H): 15.4

Skoll, or Saturn XLVII (provisional designation S/2006 S 8), is a retrograde irregular satellite of Saturn. Its discovery was announced by Scott S. Sheppard, David C. Jewitt and Jan Kleyna on 26 June 2006 from observations taken between 5 January and 30 April 2006.

Skoll is about 5 kilometres in diameter (assuming an albedo of 0.06) and orbits Saturn at an average distance of 17.6 Gm (million km) in 869 days, following a highly eccentric and moderately inclined orbit. A rotation period of 7.26±0.04 h was obtained by Cassini–Huygens in 2016, but this is in strong disagreement with 2013 data for unknown reasons; one possible explanation is variation in the rotation speed and axis due to Milankovitch wobble.

It was named in April 2007 after Sköll, a giant wolf from Norse mythology, son of Fenrir and twin brother of Hati.
