= S/2007 S 2 =

Moon of Saturn

Discovery
- Discovered by: Sheppard et al.
- Discovery date: 2007

Orbital characteristics
- Semi-major axis: 15850000 km
- Eccentricity: 0.275
- Orbital period (sidereal): −742.08 days
- Inclination: 176.6°
- Satellite of: Saturn
- Group: Norse group

Physical characteristics
- Mean diameter: 5 km
- Albedo: 0.06 (assumed)
- Spectral type: B–R = 1.37 ± 0.09
- Apparent magnitude: 24.4
- Absolute magnitude (H): 15.3

S/2007 S 2 is a natural satellite of Saturn. Its discovery was announced by Scott S. Sheppard, David C. Jewitt, Jan Kleyna, and Brian G. Marsden on May 1, 2007, from observations taken between January 18 and April 19, 2007. S/2007 S 2 is about 5 kilometres in diameter, and orbits Saturn at an average distance of 16,054,500 kilometres in 759.2 days, at an inclination of 176.65° to the ecliptic, in a retrograde direction and with an eccentricity of 0.237. According to Denk et al. (2018), it is presumably at high risk of colliding with Phoebe in the future.

The moon was once considered lost in 2007 as it was not seen since its discovery. The moon was later recovered and announced in October 2019.
