= Saturn LXVII =

Moon of Saturn

Discovery
- Discovered by: Scott S. Sheppard et al.
- Discovery site: Mauna Kea Obs.
- Discovery date: 12 December 2004

Designations
- Designation: Saturn LXVII (67)
- Alternative names: S/2004 S 7

Orbital characteristics
- Epoch 9 August 2022 (JD 2459800.5)
- Observation arc: 15.61 yr (5,703 days)
- Semi-major axis: 0.1441103 AU (21,559,000 km)
- Eccentricity: 0.5743875
- Orbital period (sidereal): –3.24 yr (–1181.80 d)
- Mean anomaly: 94.00208°
- Mean motion: 0° 18^{m} 16.63^{s} / day
- Inclination: 165.04992° (to ecliptic)
- Longitude of ascending node: 14.74072°
- Argument of perihelion: 127.76280°
- Satellite of: Saturn
- Group: Norse group

Physical characteristics
- Mean diameter: ≈6 km
- Albedo: 0.04 (assumed)
- Apparent magnitude: 24.5
- Absolute magnitude (H): 15.6

Saturn LXVII, provisionally designated S/2004 S 7, is a natural satellite of Saturn. Its discovery was announced by Scott S. Sheppard, David C. Jewitt, Jan Kleyna, and Brian G. Marsden on 4 May 2005 from observations taken between 12 December 2004 and 8 March 2005.

Saturn LXVII is about 6 kilometres in diameter, and orbits Saturn at an average distance of 21,559,000 kilometres in about 1,182 days, at an inclination of 165.0° to the ecliptic, in a retrograde direction and with an eccentricity of 0.574. Denk et al. (2018) tentatively assigned this moon to the Mundilfari dynamical family, but it may instead be more closely related to Thrymr.

This moon was considered lost until its recovery was announced on 12 October 2022. On 14 April 2026, the Minor Planet Center gave the moon its Roman numeral designation Saturn LXVII (Saturn 67).
