= Greip (moon) =

Moon of Saturn

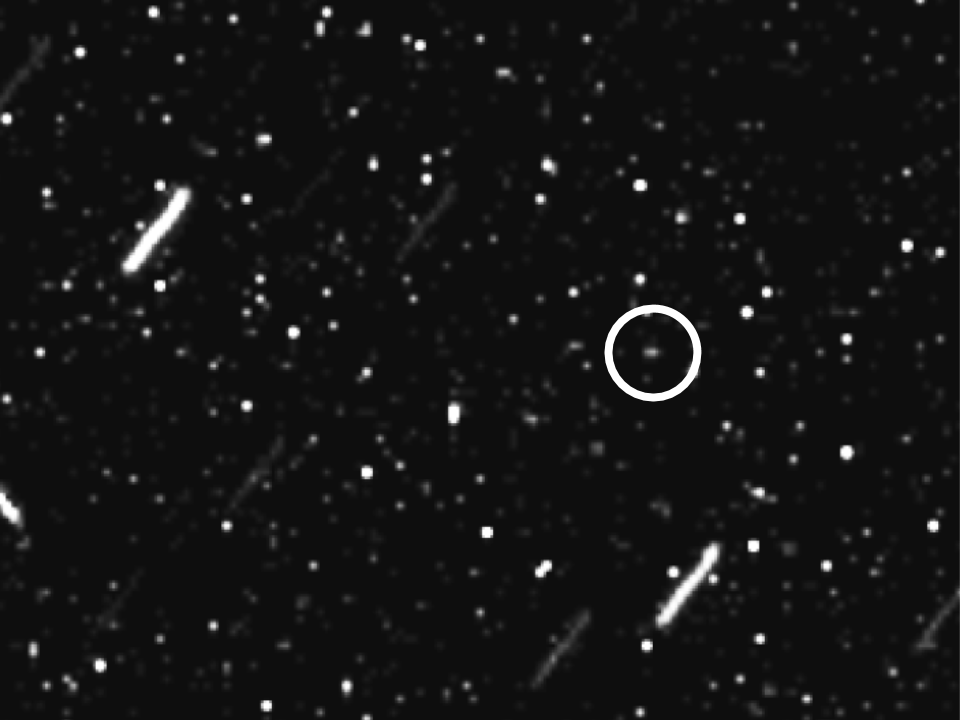
- Greip imaged by the Cassini spacecraft in September 2015

Discovery
- Discovered by: Scott S. Sheppard; David C. Jewitt; Jan T. Kleyna; Brian G. Marsden
- Discovery date: 2006

Designations
- Designation: Saturn LI
- Pronunciation: /ˈɡreɪp/
- Named after: Greipa
- Alternative names: S/2006 S 4

Orbital characteristics
- Semi-major axis: 18206000 km
- Eccentricity: 0.326
- Orbital period (sidereal): −921.2 days
- Inclination: 179.8°
- Satellite of: Saturn
- Group: Norse group

Physical characteristics
- Mean diameter: 5+50% −30% km
- Synodic rotation period: 12.75±0.35? h
- Albedo: 0.06 (assumed)
- Apparent magnitude: 24.4
- Absolute magnitude (H): 15.4

Greip or Saturn LI is a natural satellite of Saturn. Its discovery was announced by Scott S. Sheppard, David C. Jewitt, Jan Kleyna, and Brian G. Marsden on 26 June 2006, from observations taken between 5 January and 1 May 2006. Greip is about 5 kilometres in diameter, and orbits Saturn at an average distance of 18,066 Mm in 906.556 days, at an inclination of 172.7° to the ecliptic (159.2° to Saturn's equator), in a retrograde direction and with an eccentricity of 0.3735, and is presumably at high risk of eventually colliding with Phoebe. It is unknown whether Greip is more similar to Suttungr or Hyrrokkin in color. Its rotation period is most likely 12.75±0.35 hours with two minima in the light curve, but a longer period of 19 hours cannot be ruled out due to the short observation time by Cassini–Huygens.

It is named after Greip, a giantess in Norse mythology.
