= Kari (moon) =

Moon of Saturn

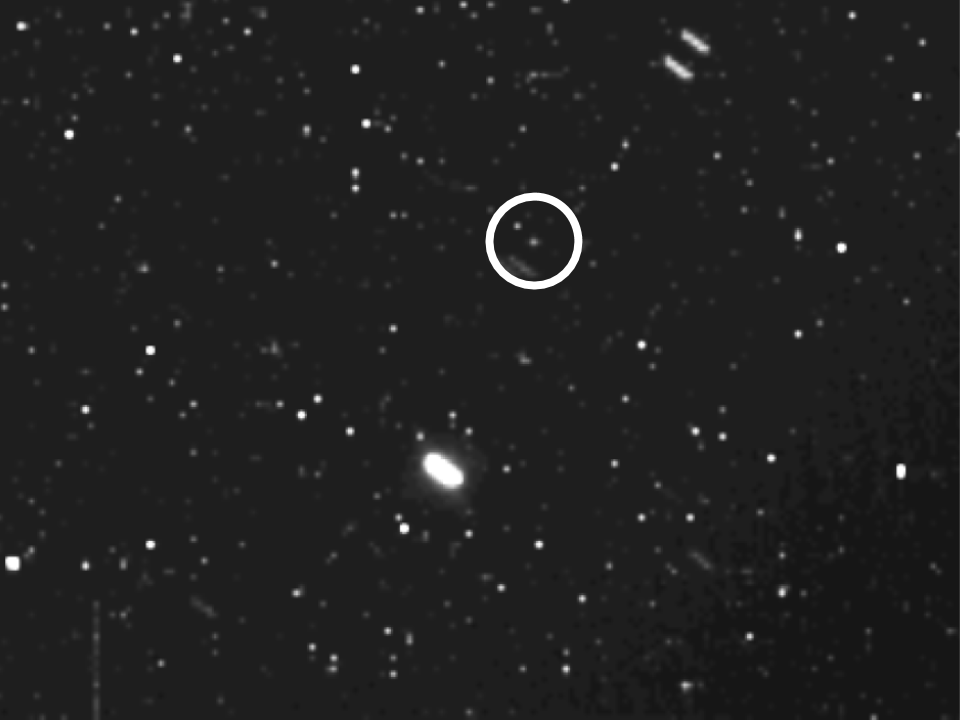
- Kari imaged by the Cassini spacecraft in May 2017

Discovery
- Discovered by: Scott S. Sheppard; David C. Jewitt; Jan T. Kleyna; Brian G. Marsden
- Discovery date: 2006

Designations
- Designation: Saturn XLV
- Pronunciation: /ˈkɑːri/, Icelandic: [ˈkʰauːrɪ]
- Named after: Kári
- Alternative names: S/2006 S 2

Orbital characteristics
- Semi-major axis: 22118000 km
- Eccentricity: 0.478
- Orbital period (sidereal): −1233.6 days
- Inclination: 156.3°
- Satellite of: Saturn
- Group: Norse group

Physical characteristics
- Mean diameter: 6+50% −30% km
- Synodic rotation period: 7.70±0.14 h
- Albedo: 0.06 (assumed)
- Spectral type: g – r = 0.31 ± 0.07, r – i = 0.53 ± 0.09
- Apparent magnitude: 23.9
- Absolute magnitude (H): 14.8

Kari or Saturn XLV is a natural satellite of Saturn. Its discovery was announced by Scott S. Sheppard, David C. Jewitt, Jan Kleyna, and Brian G. Marsden on 26 June 2006 from observations taken between January and April 2006.

Kari is about 6 kilometres in diameter, and orbits Saturn at an average distance of 22,305,100 km in 1243.71 days, at an inclination of 148.4° to the ecliptic (151.5° to Saturn's equator), in a retrograde direction and with an eccentricity of 0.3405. The rotation period has been determined to be 7.7±0.14 hours. The light curve is similar to Hyrrokkin's, having two deep and one shallow minima, and the moon is probably triangular in shape.

Kari is the largest member of an eponymous collisional sub-family of retrograde moons. The family is generally tightly packed and share similar orbital elements, with an inclination range of 151.7–157°.

It was named in April 2007 after Kári, son of Fornjót, the personification of wind in Norse mythology.
