= S/2005 S 5 =

Moon of Saturn

Discovery
- Discovered by: Scott S. Sheppard, David C. Jewitt, Jan Kleyna, Brett J. Gladman, Edward Ashton
- Discovery date: 2005

Orbital characteristics
- Semi-major axis: 21,366,200 km (13,276,300 mi)
- Eccentricity: 0.588
- Orbital period (sidereal): -3.225 yrs (1,177.82 d)
- Inclination: 169.5° (to the ecliptic)
- Satellite of: Saturn
- Group: Norse group

Physical characteristics
- Mean diameter: 3 km
- Absolute magnitude (H): 16.4

S/2005 S 5 is a small and faint natural satellite of Saturn. Its discovery was announced by Scott S. Sheppard, David C. Jewitt, Jan Kleyna, Edward Ashton, Brett J. Gladman, Jean-Marc Petit and Mike Alexandersen on May 10, 2023 from observations taken between March 9, 2005 and July 24, 2020.

S/2005 S 5 was the 100th irregular moon of Saturn announced.

== Physical characteristics, orbit, and origin ==
S/2005 S 5 orbits Saturn at a distance of 21.030 million km in 1,138.62 days, at an inclination of 172.52, orbits in a retrograde direction and has an eccentricity of 0.510. S/2005 S 5 belongs to the Norse group and is a member of the Mundilfari subgroup, possibly a fragment of Mundilfari.

S/2005 S 5 is estimated to be about 3 kilometers in diameter.
