= Warg =

Wolf in fantasy

In the philologist and fantasy author J. R. R. Tolkien's Middle-earth fiction, a warg is a particularly large and evil kind of wolf that could be ridden by orcs. He derived the name and characteristics of his wargs by combining meanings and myths from Old Norse and Old English. In Norse mythology, a vargr (anglicised as warg) is a wolf, especially the wolf Fenrir that destroyed the god Odin in the battle of Ragnarök, and the wolves Sköll and Hati, Fenrir's children, who perpetually chase the Sun and Moon. In Old English, a wearh is an outcast who may be strangled to death.

Through Tolkien's influence, wargs have featured in fantasy books by authors including George R. R. Martin, and in media such as video games and role-playing games.

== Etymology and origins ==
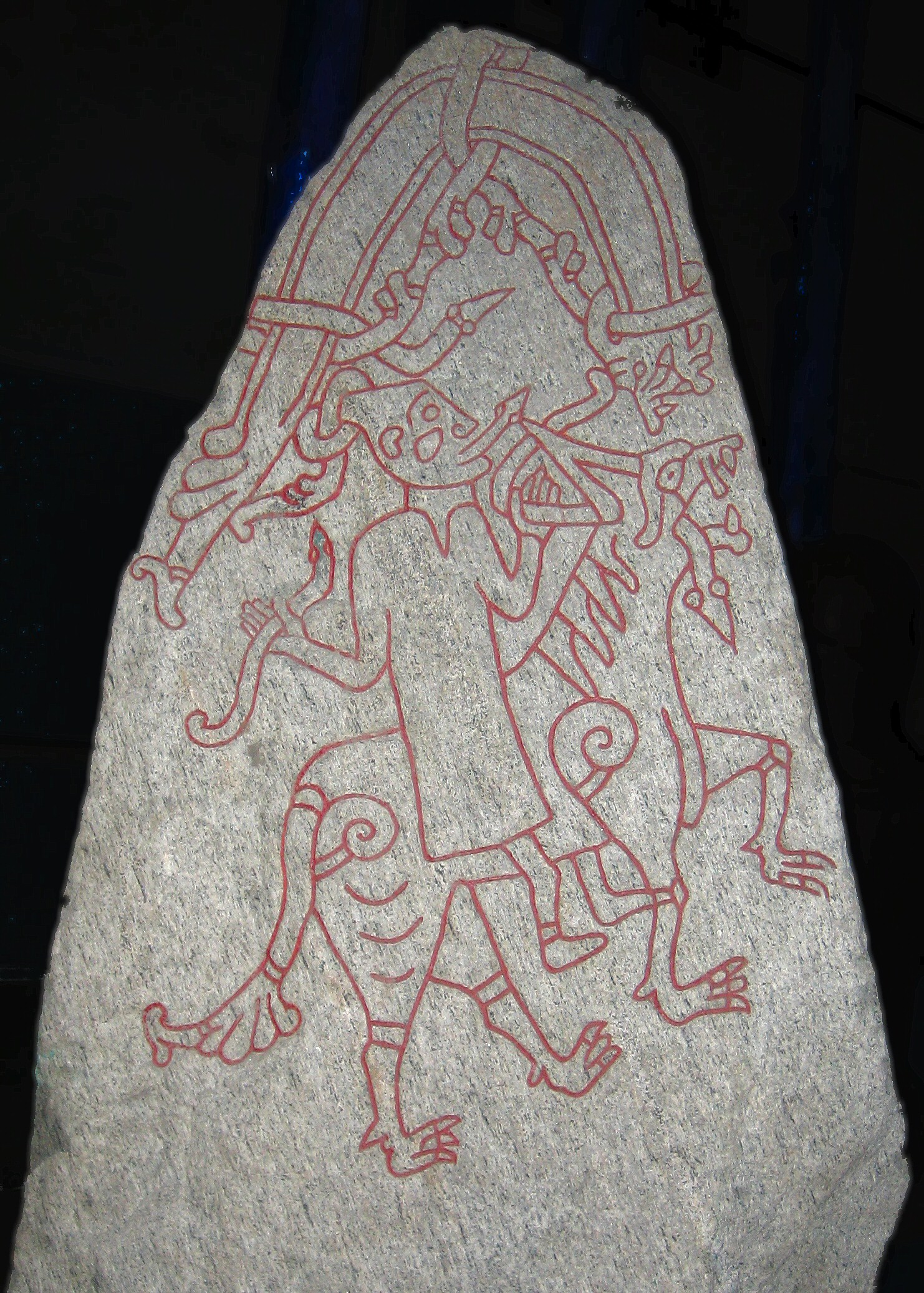
The jötunn Hyrrokin riding a wolf, on an image stone from the Hunnestad Monument, constructed in 985–1035 AD

The Tolkien scholar Tom Shippey states that Tolkien's spelling "warg" is a cross of Old Norse vargr and Old English wearh. He notes that the words embody a shift in meaning from "wolf" to "outlaw": vargr carries both meanings, while wearh means "outcast" or "outlaw", but has lost the sense of "wolf". In Old Norse, vargr is derived from the Proto-Germanic root reconstructed as *wargaz, ultimately derived from the Proto-Indo-European (PIE) root reconstructed as *werg̑ʰ- "destroy". Vargr (compare modern Swedish varg "wolf") arose as a non-taboo name for úlfr, the normal Old Norse term for "wolf". Shippey adds that there is an Old English verb, awyrgan, meaning both "to condemn [an outcast]" and "to strangle [an outcast to death]"; he writes that a possible further sense is "to worry [a sheep], to bite to death". He writes that

Tolkien's word 'Warg' clearly splits the difference between Old Norse and Old English pronunciations, and his concept of them – wolves, but not just wolves, intelligent and malevolent wolves – combines the two ancient opinions.

In Norse mythology, wargs are the mythological wolves Fenrir, Sköll and Hati. Sköll and Hati are wolves, one going after the Sun, the other after the Moon. Wolves served as mounts for more or less dangerous humanoid creatures. For instance, Gunnr's horse was a kenning for "wolf" on the Rök runestone. In the Lay of Hyndla, the eponymous seeress rides a wolf. The jötunn Hyrrokkin arrives at Baldr's funeral on a wolf.

The medievalist and Tolkien scholar Marjorie Burns writes that Tolkien uses the fact that wolves were among the Norse god Odin's war beasts "in a particularly innovative way". Odin kept two wolves, Freki and Geri, their names both meaning "Greedy"; and in the final battle that destroys the world, Ragnarök, Odin is killed and eaten by the gigantic wolf Fenrir. Thus, Burns points out, wolves were both associates of Odin, and his mortal enemy. She argues that Tolkien made use of both relationships in The Lord of the Rings. In her view, both the Dark Lord Sauron and the evil Wizard Saruman embody "attributes of a negative Odin". She points out that Saruman has wargs in his army, while Sauron uses "the likeness of a ravening wolf" (Note: Tolkien 1955, book 5, ch. 4, "The Siege of Gondor") for the enormous battering ram named Grond which destroys the main gate of Minas Tirith. On the other side, the benevolent Wizard Gandalf leads the fight against the wargs in The Hobbit, using his ability to create fire, and understands their language. In The Fellowship of the Ring, Gandalf again uses magic and fire to drive off a great wolf, "The Hound of Sauron", (Note: Tolkien 1954a, book 2, ch. 4, "A Journey in the Dark") and his wolf-pack; Burns writes that the wolves' attempt "to devour Gandalf hints at Odin's fate", recalling the myth of Fenrir and Odin.

== J. R. R. Tolkien ==
... and in the middle of the circle was a great grey wolf. He spoke to them in the dreadful language of the Wargs. Gandalf understood it. Bilbo did not, but it sounded terrible to him, and as if all their talk was about cruel and wicked things, as it was. Every now and then all the Wargs in the circle would answer their grey chief all together ...

— Tolkien's description of wargs in The Hobbit (Note: Tolkien 1937 ch. 6 "Out of the Frying-pan into the Fire")

In J. R. R. Tolkien's books about Middle-earth, wargs are a malevolent wolf-like race. They are usually in league with the Orcs whom they permit to ride on their backs into battle, sharing any spoils. In The Hobbit, they can speak: they plan their part in "a great goblin-raid" on the woodmen's villages.

Tolkien's wargs influenced the ten-year-old Rayner Unwin to write a positive review of The Hobbit, with the words "Bilbo Baggins was a hobbit who lived in his hobbit hole and never went for adventures, at last Gandalf the wizard and his dwarves persuaded him to go. He had a very ex[c]iting time fighting goblins and wargs." The review led his father, Stanley Unwin, to publish the book, still doubting its likely commercial success.

Wargs being used as cavalry mounts, as depicted in Peter Jackson's The Two Towers, battling the Riders of Rohan

Peter Jackson's film adaptations of Tolkien's The Hobbit and The Lord of the Rings show wargs as mounts for Orcs, battling the horse-riders of Rohan.

The critic Gregory Hartley treats wargs as "personified animals", along with the sentient eagles, giant spiders, Smaug the dragon, ravens and thrushes. Tolkien writes about their actions using verbs like "[to] plan" and "[to] guard", implying in Hartley's view that the monstrous wargs are "more than mere beasts", but he denies that they "possess autonomous wills". T. A. Leederman calls Tolkien's wargs "a species of semi-intelligent but evil-aligned mount wolves ... on whom the orcs rode into battle". He notes that they may have been derived, in the fiction, from First Age werewolves like Carcharoth, with their own "proto-language".

== In Dungeons & Dragons ==
In the context of the tabletop game Dungeons & Dragons, "wargs" first appeared in Gary Gygax's Swords and Spells supplement (1976), but were renamed to "worgs" (along with balrogs to "balors", ents to "treants", and hobbits to "halflings") in response to a lawsuit from Tolkien's estate.

In the first edition of the Monster Manual (1977), "dire wolf (worg)" appears under the entry for "wolf". In later editions, such as the 2014 edition, "worg" receives its own entry. Worgs, unlike most animalistic creatures, can speak. They can speak their own language, as well as Goblin and Common.

== Other authors and media ==
In George R. R. Martin's series of epic fantasy novels, A Song of Ice and Fire, and the series' television adaptation, Game of Thrones, Wargs are skinchangers who can enter the mind of animals (and in Bran Stark's case with Hodor, a person), see what they are seeing, and control their actions. In Wen Spencer's Tinker (Elfhome) series, wargs are large magically engineered wolves.

Similar Tolkien-based creatures appear in some fantasy video games, including The Lord of the Rings Online, Age of Conan, and World of Warcraft, both as four-legged monsters, and as a race of anthropomorphic werewolves, the Worgen.

== See also ==
- List of individual wolves
