= S/2004 S 36 =

Moon of Saturn

Discovery
- Discovered by: Sheppard et al.
- Discovery date: 2019

Designations
- Alternative names: S5593a2

Orbital characteristics
- Semi-major axis: 23698700 km
- Eccentricity: 0.667
- Orbital period (sidereal): −1354.2 days
- Inclination: 147.6°
- Satellite of: Saturn
- Group: Norse group

Physical characteristics
- Mean diameter: 3 km
- Apparent magnitude: 25.3

S/2004 S 36 is a natural satellite of Saturn. Its discovery was announced by Scott S. Sheppard, David C. Jewitt, and Jan Kleyna on October 8, 2019, from observations taken between December 12, 2004, and February 1, 2006.

S/2004 S 36 is about 3 kilometres in diameter, and orbits Saturn at an average distance of 23.192 million km in 1319.07 days, at an inclination of 155° to the ecliptic, in a retrograde direction and with a high eccentricity of 0.748.
