= S/2007 S 3 =

Moon of Saturn

Discovery
- Discovered by: Scott S. Sheppard et al.
- Discovery site: Mauna Kea Obs.
- Discovery date: 16 January 2007

Orbital characteristics
- Epoch 9 August 2022 (JD 2459800.5)
- Observation arc: 14.48 yr (5,287 days)
- Semi-major axis: 0.1298753 AU (19,429,000 km)
- Eccentricity: 0.1428233
- Orbital period (sidereal): –2.77 yr (–1011.10 d)
- Mean anomaly: 270.66716°
- Mean motion: 0° 21^{m} 21.778^{s} / day
- Inclination: 176.62877° (to ecliptic)
- Longitude of ascending node: 127.32559°
- Argument of perihelion: 18.70983°
- Satellite of: Saturn
- Group: Norse group

Physical characteristics
- Mean diameter: ≈5 km
- Albedo: 0.04 (assumed)
- Apparent magnitude: 24.9
- Absolute magnitude (H): 15.7

S/2007 S 3 is a natural satellite of Saturn. Its discovery was announced by Scott S. Sheppard, David C. Jewitt, Jan Kleyna, and Brian G. Marsden on 1 May 2007 from observations taken between 18 January and 19 April 2007.

S/2007 S 3 is about 5 kilometres in diameter, and orbits Saturn at an average distance of 19,429,000 kilometres in about 1,011 days, at an inclination of 176.6° to the ecliptic, in a retrograde direction and with an eccentricity of 0.143.

This moon was considered lost until its recovery was announced on 12 October 2022.
