= Loge (moon) =

Moon of Saturn

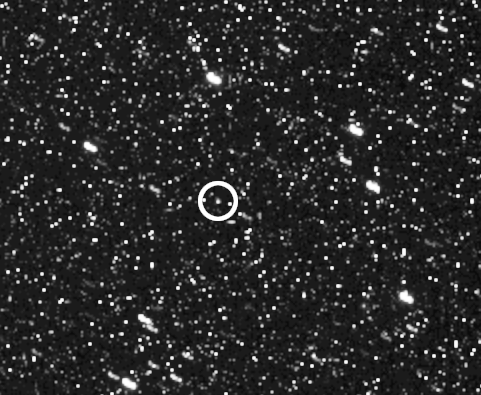
- Loge (circled) imaged by the Cassini spacecraft in February 2015

Discovery
- Discovered by: Scott S. Sheppard; David C. Jewitt; Jan T. Kleyna; Brian G. Marsden
- Discovery date: 2006

Designations
- Designation: Saturn XLVI
- Pronunciation: /ˈlɔɪ.eɪ/ or spelling pronunciation /ˈloʊɡiː/
- Named after: Logi
- Alternative names: S/2006 S 5

Orbital characteristics
- Semi-major axis: 23065000 km
- Eccentricity: 0.187
- Orbital period (sidereal): −1312.0 days
- Inclination: 167.9°
- Satellite of: Saturn
- Group: Norse group

Physical characteristics
- Mean diameter: 5+50% −30% km
- Synodic rotation period: 6.9±0.1? h
- Albedo: 0.06 (assumed)
- Spectral type: r – i = 0.15 ± 0.08
- Apparent magnitude: 24.6
- Absolute magnitude (H): 15.3

Loge or Saturn XLVI is a natural satellite of Saturn. Its discovery was announced by Scott S. Sheppard, David C. Jewitt, Jan Kleyna, and Brian G. Marsden on 26 June 2006, from observations taken between January and April 2006.

== Characteristics ==
Loge is about 5 kilometres in diameter, and orbits Saturn at an average distance of 23,142,000 km in 1314.364 days, at an inclination of 166.5° to the ecliptic (165.3° to Saturn's equator), in a retrograde direction and with an eccentricity of 0.1390. It has a tentative rotation period of about 6.9±0.1 hours, but this is highly uncertain as the light curve is the shallowest among all the irregular moons studied by Cassini–Huygens (amplitude about 0.07 magnitudes).

It was named in April 2007, after Logi, a fire giant from Norse mythology.
