= Surtur (moon) =

Moon of Saturn

Discovery
- Discovered by: Scott S. Sheppard; David C. Jewitt; Jan T. Kleyna; Brian G. Marsden
- Discovery date: 26 June 2006

Designations
- Designation: Saturn XLVIII
- Pronunciation: /ˈsɜːrtər/ or /ˈsʊərtər/
- Named after: Surt
- Alternative names: S/2006 S 7
- Adjectives: Surtian /ˈsɜːrtiən/ (Note: The oblique stem of the name is Surt. The -ur is the nominative case ending.)

Orbital characteristics
- Semi-major axis: 22707000 km
- Eccentricity: 0.451
- Orbital period (sidereal): −1297.7 days
- Inclination: 177.5°
- Satellite of: Saturn
- Group: Norse group

Physical characteristics
- Mean diameter: 4 km
- Albedo: 0.06 (assumed)
- Apparent magnitude: 24.8
- Absolute magnitude (H): 15.8

Surtur /ˈsɜːrtər/ or Saturn XLVIII (provisional designation S/2006 S 7) is a natural satellite of Saturn. Its discovery was announced by Scott S. Sheppard, David C. Jewitt, Jan Kleyna, and Brian G. Marsden on June 26, 2006 from observations taken between January and April 2006. It was named after Surt, a leader of the fire giants of Norse mythology.

Surtur is about 4 kilometres in diameter, and orbits Saturn at an average distance of 22.707 Mm in 1297.7 days. The Surtian orbit is retrograde, at an inclination of 177.5° to the ecliptic and with an eccentricity of 0.451.
