= Bergelmir (moon) =

Moon of Saturn

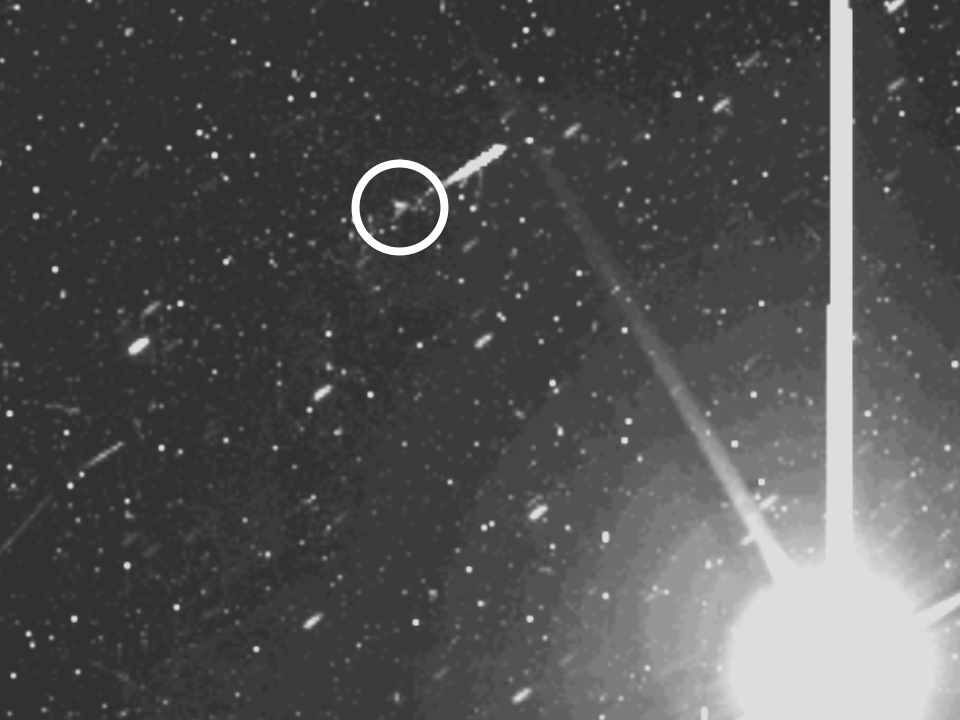
- Bergelmir imaged by the Cassini spacecraft in September 2014

Discovery
- Discovered by: S. Sheppard, D. Jewitt, J. Kleyna, and B. Marsden
- Discovery date: May 4, 2005

Designations
- Designation: Saturn XXXVIII
- Pronunciation: /ˈbɛərjɛlmɪər/ or /ˈbɜːrɡəlmɪər/ (Note: The 'g' has a 'y' sound in Norse (indeed gelmir sounds like what it means in English, 'yeller'), but a spelling pronunciation would have it as 'g', as 'Aurgelmir' does in Merriam-Webster's Encyclopedia of Literature (1995).)
- Named after: Bergelmir
- Alternative names: S/2004 S 15
- Adjectives: Bergelmian (Note: The oblique stem of the name is Bergelmi, as in Modern Norwegian Bergelme. The -r is the nominative case ending.)

Orbital characteristics
- Semi-major axis: 19338000 km
- Eccentricity: 0.142
- Orbital period (sidereal): 1006.659 d
- Inclination: 158.5°
- Satellite of: Saturn
- Group: Norse group

Physical characteristics
- Mean diameter: 5+50% −30% km
- Synodic rotation period: 8.13±0.09 h
- Albedo: 0.06 (assumed)
- Spectral type: B–R = 1.10 ± 0.15
- Apparent magnitude: 24.2
- Absolute magnitude (H): 15.2

Bergelmir, or Saturn XXXVIII (provisional designation S/2004 S 15), is a natural satellite of Saturn. Its discovery was announced by Scott S. Sheppard, David C. Jewitt, Jan Kleyna, and Brian G. Marsden on May 4, 2005, from observations taken between December 12, 2004, and March 9, 2005.

Bergelmir is about 6 kilometers (4 miles) in diameter, and orbits Saturn at an average distance of 19,338,000 km in 1006.659 days, at an inclination of 157° to the ecliptic (134° to Saturn's equator), in a retrograde direction and with an eccentricity of 0.152. Its rotation period is 8.13±0.09 hours.

It was named in April 2007 after Bergelmir, a giant from Norse mythology and the grandson of Ymir, the primordial giant. Bergelmir and his wife alone among their kind were the only survivors of the enormous deluge of blood from Ymir's wounds when he was killed by Odin and his brothers at the dawn of time. Bergelmir then became the progenitor of a new race of giants.
