= Geirrod (moon) =

Moon of Saturn

Discovery
- Discovered by: Sheppard et al.
- Discovery date: 2019

Designations
- Pronunciation: /ˈjeɪrɒd/
- Named after: Geirröðr
- Alternative names: Saturn LXVI; S/2004 S 38; S8568a

Orbital characteristics
- Semi-major axis: 23006200 km
- Eccentricity: 0.381
- Orbital period (sidereal): −1295.8 days
- Inclination: 155.0°
- Satellite of: Saturn
- Group: Norse group

Physical characteristics
- Mean diameter: 4 km
- Apparent magnitude: 25.1

Geirrod (Saturn LXVI), provisionally known as S/2004 S 38, is a natural satellite of Saturn. Its discovery was announced by Scott S. Sheppard, David C. Jewitt, and Jan Kleyna on October 8, 2019 from observations taken between December 12, 2004 and March 22, 2007. It was given its permanent designation in August 2021. On 24 August 2022, it was officially named after Geirröðr, a jötunn from Norse mythology. He is an enemy of Thor and is killed by him.

Geirrod is about 4 kilometres in diameter, and orbits Saturn at an average distance of 21.908 million km in 1,211.02 days, at an inclination of 154° to the ecliptic, in a retrograde direction and with an eccentricity of 0.437.
