= Hyrrokkin (moon) =

Moon of Saturn

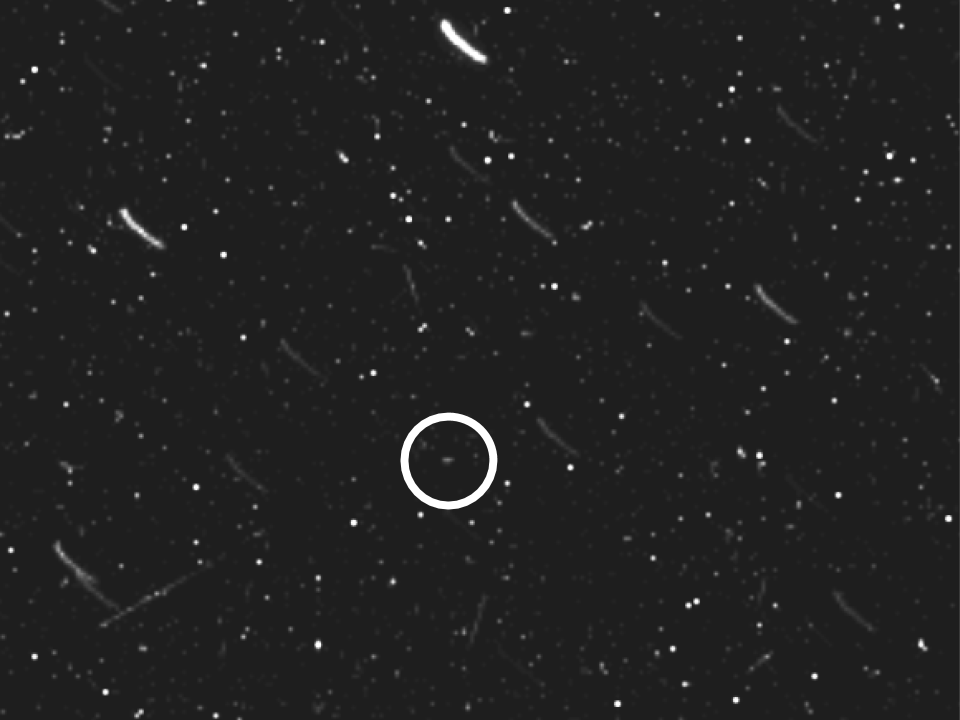
- Hyrrokkin imaged by the Cassini spacecraft in March 2013

Discovery
- Discovered by: Scott S. Sheppard; David C. Jewitt; Jan T. Kleyna; Brian G. Marsden
- Discovery date: December 2004

Designations
- Designation: Saturn XLIV
- Pronunciation: /hɪˈrɒkən/
- Named after: Hyrrokkin
- Alternative names: S/2004 S 19

Orbital characteristics
- Semi-major axis: 18437000 km
- Eccentricity: 0.3
- Orbital period (sidereal): −931.8 days
- Inclination: 151°
- Satellite of: Saturn
- Group: Norse group

Physical characteristics
- Mean diameter: 8+50% −30% km
- Synodic rotation period: 12.76±0.03 h
- Albedo: 0.06 (assumed)
- Spectral type: g – r = 0.50 ± 0.08, r – i = 0.34 ± 0.09
- Apparent magnitude: 23.5
- Absolute magnitude (H): 14.3

Hyrrokkin or Saturn XLIV is a natural satellite of Saturn. Its discovery was announced by Scott S. Sheppard, David C. Jewitt, Jan Kleyna, and Brian G. Marsden on June 26, 2006, from observations taken between December 12, 2004, and April 30, 2006.

Hyrrokkin is about 8 kilometres in diameter, and orbits Saturn at an average distance of 18,168 Mm in 914 days, at an inclination of 153° to the ecliptic (154° to Saturn's equator), in a retrograde direction and with an eccentricity of 0.3582. During four observations in March 2013, the synodic rotational period was measured by the Cassini spacecraft to approximately 12 hours and 45 minutes. The rotation period was later refined to 12.76±0.03 hours. Its light curve shows three minima as seen in Ymir and Siarnaq, but has one minimum much shallower than the others. The rotation period and orbit are similar to Greip's, with only the inclination being appreciably different, but it is not known whether the moons are closely related to each other.

It was named in April 2007 after Hyrrokkin, a giantess from Norse mythology, who launched Hringhorni, Baldr's funeral ship. It was originally listed as being spelled Hyrokkin, but the spelling was later corrected as Hyrrokkin.
