= S/2004 S 39 =

Moon of Saturn

Discovery
- Discovered by: Sheppard et al.
- Discovery date: 2019

Designations
- Alternative names: S64454x

Orbital characteristics
- Semi-major axis: 22790400 km
- Eccentricity: 0.08
- Orbital period (sidereal): −1277.5 days
- Inclination: 167.6°
- Satellite of: Saturn
- Group: Norse group

Physical characteristics
- Mean diameter: 2 km
- Apparent magnitude: 25.5
- Absolute magnitude (H): 16.3

S/2004 S 39 is a natural satellite of Saturn. Its discovery was announced by Scott S. Sheppard, David C. Jewitt, and Jan Kleyna on October 8, 2019 from observations taken between December 12, 2004 and March 21, 2007.

S/2004 S 39 is about 2 kilometres in diameter, and orbits Saturn at an average distance of 23.575 million km in 1351.83 days, at an inclination of 167° to the ecliptic, in a retrograde direction and with an eccentricity of 0.080.
