= S/2006 S 3 =

Moon of Saturn

Discovery
- Discovered by: Sheppard et al.
- Discovery date: 2006

Orbital characteristics
- Semi-major axis: 21408300 km
- Eccentricity: 0.434
- Orbital period (sidereal): −1164.3 days
- Inclination: 151.7°
- Satellite of: Saturn
- Group: Norse group

Physical characteristics
- Mean diameter: 4 km
- Albedo: 0.06 (assumed)
- Apparent magnitude: 24.6
- Absolute magnitude (H): 15.6

S/2006 S 3 is a natural satellite of Saturn. Its discovery was announced by Scott S. Sheppard, David C. Jewitt, Jan Kleyna, and Brian G. Marsden on June 26, 2006, from observations taken between January and April 2006.

S/2006 S 3 is about 6 kilometres in diameter, and orbits Saturn at an average distance of 21,308,400 km in 1160.7 days, at an inclination of 152.8° to the ecliptic, in a retrograde direction and with an eccentricity of 0.4707.

The moon was once considered lost in 2006 as it was not seen since its discovery. The moon was later recovered and announced in October 2019.
