= Narvi (moon) =

Moon of Saturn

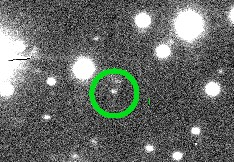
- Narvi's discovery image

Discovery
- Discovered by: Scott S. Sheppard et al.
- Discovery date: 11 April 2003

Designations
- Pronunciation: /ˈnɑːrvi/
- Named after: Narfi
- Alternative names: S/2003 S 1

Orbital characteristics
- Semi-major axis: 19226600 km
- Eccentricity: 0.2990
- Orbital period (sidereal): −995.33 days
- Inclination: 136.803°
- Satellite of: Saturn
- Group: Norse group

Physical characteristics
- Mean radius: 3.5+50% −30% km
- Synodic rotation period: 10.21±0.02 h
- Albedo: 0.06 (assumed)
- Spectral type: g – r = 0.24 ± 0.07, r – i = 0.42 ± 0.09
- Apparent magnitude: 23.8

Narvi /ˈnɑːrvi/ or Saturn XXXI is a natural satellite of Saturn. It was discovered by a team of astronomers led by Scott S. Sheppard in 2003, and given the temporary designation S/2003 S 1.

== Description ==
Narvi is about 7 kilometres in diameter, and orbits Saturn at an average distance of 19,371,000 km in 1006.541 days, at an inclination of 136.8° to the ecliptic (109° to Saturn's equator), in a retrograde direction and with an eccentricity of 0.2990, very similar to Bestla's orbit. Narvi's orbit can temporarily fall into secular resonance with Saturn. Narvi's rotation period is 10.21±0.02 hours, and its light curve has three minima like Siarnaq and Ymir. Unlike the other triangular moons, however, one minimum is much higher than the others, and the maximum that is a half-period ahead is much lower.

== Naming ==
It was named in January 2005 after Narfi, a giant in Norse mythology. The name was approved by the IAU Working Group on Planetary System Nomenclature on 21 January 2005.
