= S/2004 S 17 =

Moon of Saturn

Discovery
- Discovered by: Scott S. Sheppard et al.
- Discovery site: Mauna Kea Obs.
- Discovery date: 13 December 2004

Orbital characteristics
- Epoch 9 August 2022 (JD 2459800.5)
- Observation arc: 15.67 yr (5,725 days)
- Semi-major axis: 0.1326708 AU (19,847,000 km)
- Eccentricity: 0.1647702
- Orbital period (sidereal): –2.86 yr (–1043.92 d)
- Mean anomaly: 226.13753°
- Mean motion: 0° 20^{m} 41.48^{s} / day
- Inclination: 168.11825° (to ecliptic)
- Longitude of ascending node: 34.46812°
- Argument of perihelion: 186.71765°
- Satellite of: Saturn
- Group: Norse group

Physical characteristics
- Mean diameter: ≈4 km
- Albedo: 0.04 (assumed)
- Apparent magnitude: 25.2
- Absolute magnitude (H): 16.0

S/2004 S 17 is a natural satellite of Saturn. Its discovery was announced by Scott S. Sheppard, David C. Jewitt, Jan Kleyna, and Brian G. Marsden on 4 May 2005 from observations taken between 13 December 2004 and 5 March 2005.

S/2004 S 17 is about 4 kilometres in diameter, and orbits Saturn at an average distance of 19,847,000 kilometres in about 1,044 days, at an inclination of 168.1° to the ecliptic, in a retrograde direction and with an eccentricity of 0.165.

This moon was considered lost until its recovery was announced on 12 October 2022.
