= S/2004 S 13 =

Moon of Saturn

Discovery
- Discovered by: Scott S. Sheppard et al.
- Discovery site: Mauna Kea Obs.
- Discovery date: 12 December 2004

Orbital characteristics
- Epoch 9 August 2022 (JD 2459800.5)
- Observation arc: 15.60 yr (5,699 days)
- Semi-major axis: 0.1235696 AU (18,486,000 km)
- Eccentricity: 0.2713528
- Orbital period (sidereal): –2.57 yr (–938.36 d)
- Mean anomaly: 318.38441°
- Mean motion: 0° 23^{m} 1.133^{s} / day
- Inclination: 166.99515° (to ecliptic)
- Longitude of ascending node: 235.01103°
- Argument of perihelion: 18.66111°
- Satellite of: Saturn
- Group: Norse group

Physical characteristics
- Mean diameter: ≈6 km
- Albedo: 0.04 (assumed)
- Apparent magnitude: 24.5
- Absolute magnitude (H): 16.3

S/2004 S 13 is a natural satellite of Saturn. Its discovery was announced by Scott S. Sheppard, David C. Jewitt, Jan Kleyna, and Brian G. Marsden on 4 May 2005 from observations taken between 12 December 2004 and 9 March 2005.

S/2004 S 13 is about 6 kilometres in diameter, and orbits Saturn at an average distance of 18,486,000 kilometres in about 938 days, at an inclination of 167.0° to the ecliptic, in a retrograde direction and with an eccentricity of 0.271.

This moon was considered lost until its recovery was announced on 12 October 2022.
