= S/2004 S 37 =

Moon of Saturn

Discovery
- Discovered by: Sheppard et al.
- Discovery date: 2019

Designations
- Alternative names: S6055a2

Orbital characteristics
- Semi-major axis: 16003300 km
- Eccentricity: 0.506
- Orbital period (sidereal): −752.88 days
- Inclination: 164.0°
- Satellite of: Saturn
- Group: Norse group

Physical characteristics
- Mean diameter: 4 km
- Apparent magnitude: 25.1

S/2004 S 37 is a natural satellite of Saturn. Its discovery was announced by Scott S. Sheppard, David C. Jewitt, and Jan Kleyna on October 8, 2019 from observations taken between December 12, 2004 and February 2, 2006.

S/2004 S 37 is about 4 kilometres in diameter, and orbits Saturn at an average distance of 15.892 million km in 748.18 days, at an inclination of 163° to the ecliptic, in a retrograde direction and with an eccentricity of 0.497.
