= S/2006 S 1 =

Moon of Saturn

Discovery
- Discovered by: Scott S. Sheppard; David C. Jewitt; Jan T. Kleyna
- Discovery date: 6 March 2006

Orbital characteristics
- Epoch 31 May 2020 (JD 2459000.5)
- Observation arc: 2.13 yr (776 d)
- Earliest precovery date: 5 January 2005
- Semi-major axis: 0.1246859 AU (18,652,750 km)
- Eccentricity: 0.0814088
- Orbital period (sidereal): −2.604 yr (−951.1 d)
- Mean anomaly: 351.30293°
- Mean motion: 0° 22^{m} 42.627^{s} / day
- Inclination: 154.62928° (to the ecliptic)
- Longitude of ascending node: 351.18965°
- Argument of perihelion: 176.02188°
- Satellite of: Saturn
- Group: Norse group

Physical characteristics
- Mean diameter: ≈5 km ≈6 km
- Albedo: 0.04 (assumed)
- Apparent magnitude: 24.5
- Absolute magnitude (H): 15.6

S/2006 S 1 is a natural satellite of Saturn. Its discovery was announced by Scott S. Sheppard, David C. Jewitt, Jan Kleyna, and Brian G. Marsden on June 26, 2006 from observations taken between January 4 and April 30, 2006. S/2006 S 1 is about 6 kilometres in diameter, and orbits Saturn at an average distance of 18.65 million km in 951.1 days, at an inclination of 154.6° to the ecliptic (178.9° to Saturn's equator), in a retrograde direction and with an eccentricity of 0.0814.

The moon was once considered lost in 2006 as it was not seen since its discovery. The moon was later recovered and announced in October 2019.
