= S/2006 S 9 =

Moon of Saturn

Discovery
- Discovered by: Scott S. Sheppard, David C. Jewitt, Jan Kleyna, Brett J. Gladman
- Discovery date: 2006

Orbital characteristics
- Semi-major axis: 14,406,600 km (8,951,800 mi)
- Eccentricity: 0.248
- Orbital period (sidereal): -1.774 yrs (647.89 d)
- Inclination: 173.0° (to the ecliptic)
- Satellite of: Saturn
- Group: Norse group

Physical characteristics
- Mean diameter: 3 km
- Absolute magnitude (H): 16.5

S/2006 S 9 is a natural satellite of Saturn. Its discovery was announced by Scott S. Sheppard, David C. Jewitt, Jan Kleyna, Edward Ashton, Brett J. Gladman, Jean-Marc Petit and Mike Alexandersen on May 3, 2023 from observations taken between February 1, 2006 and July 1, 2021.

S/2006 S 9 is about 3 kilometers in diameter, and orbits Saturn at a distance of 14.407 million km in 648.71 days, at an inclination of 173.0, orbits in a retrograde direction and with an eccentricity of 0.248. S/2006 S 9 belongs to the Norse group and it could possibly be a Phoebe fragment like S/2006 S 20, since it orbits at close proximity to Phoebe.
