= S/2004 S 12 =

Moon of Saturn

Discovery
- Discovered by: Scott S. Sheppard et al.
- Discovery site: Mauna Kea Obs.
- Discovery date: 12 December 2004

Orbital characteristics
- Epoch 9 August 2022 (JD 2459800.5)
- Observation arc: 15.61 yr (5,703 days)
- Semi-major axis: 0.1327201 AU (19,855,000 km)
- Eccentricity: 0.3711930
- Orbital period (sidereal): –2.86 yr (–1044.50 d)
- Mean anomaly: 326.59167°
- Mean motion: 0° 20^{m} 40.789^{s} / day
- Inclination: 163.85743° (to ecliptic)
- Longitude of ascending node: 330.73760°
- Argument of perihelion: 111.13920°
- Satellite of: Saturn
- Group: Norse group

Physical characteristics
- Mean diameter: ≈5 km
- Albedo: 0.04 (assumed)
- Apparent magnitude: 24.8
- Absolute magnitude (H): 15.9

S/2004 S 12 is a natural satellite of Saturn. Its discovery was announced by Scott S. Sheppard, David C. Jewitt, Jan Kleyna, and Brian G. Marsden on 4 May 2005 from observations taken between 12 December 2004 and 9 March 2005.

S/2004 S 12 is about 5 kilometres in diameter, and orbits Saturn at an average distance of 19,855,000 kilometres in about 1,044 days, at an inclination of 163.9° to the ecliptic, in a retrograde direction and with an eccentricity of 0.371.

This moon was considered lost until its recovery was announced on 12 October 2022. (In 2021, it had also been found in Canada-France-Hawaii Telescope observations from 2019.)
