= Farbauti (moon) =

Moon of Saturn

Discovery
- Discovered by: Scott S. Sheppard; David C. Jewitt; Jan T. Kleyna; Brian G. Marsden
- Discovery date: December 2004

Designations
- Designation: Saturn XL
- Pronunciation: /fɑːrˈbaʊti/
- Named after: Fárbauti
- Alternative names: S/2004 S 9

Orbital characteristics
- Semi-major axis: 20390000 km
- Eccentricity: 0.206
- Orbital period (sidereal): −1086.1 days
- Inclination: 156.4°
- Satellite of: Saturn
- Group: Norse group

Physical characteristics
- Mean diameter: 4 km
- Albedo: 0.06 (assumed)
- Apparent magnitude: 24.7
- Absolute magnitude (H): 15.7

Farbauti /fɑːrˈbaʊti/ or Saturn XL is a natural satellite of Saturn. Its discovery was announced by Scott S. Sheppard, David C. Jewitt, Jan Kleyna, and Brian G. Marsden on May 4, 2005, from observations taken between December 12, 2004, and March 9, 2005.

Farbauti is about 4 kilometres in diameter, and orbits Saturn at an average distance of 20,291 Mm in 1079.099 days, at an inclination of 158° to the ecliptic (131° to Saturn's equator), in a retrograde direction and with an eccentricity of 0.209.

It was named in April 2007 after Fárbauti, a storm giant from Norse mythology, father of Loki.
