= S/2004 S 21 =

Moon of Saturn

Discovery
- Discovered by: Sheppard et al.
- Discovery date: 2019

Designations
- Alternative names: S5602a

Orbital characteristics
- Semi-major axis: 23810400 km
- Eccentricity: 0.312
- Orbital period (sidereal): −1365.1 days
- Inclination: 154.6°
- Satellite of: Saturn
- Group: Norse group

Physical characteristics
- Mean diameter: 3 km
- Apparent magnitude: 25.4

S/2004 S 21 is a natural satellite of Saturn. Its discovery was announced by Scott S. Sheppard, David C. Jewitt, and Jan Kleyna on October 7, 2019 from observations taken between December 12, 2004 and January 17, 2007.

== Background ==
S/2004 S 21 is about 3 kilometers in diameter, and orbits Saturn at an average distance of 22.645 million km in 1272.61 days, at an inclination of 160° to the ecliptic, in a retrograde direction and with an eccentricity of 0.318.
