= S/2004 S 28 =

Moon of Saturn

Discovery
- Discovered by: Sheppard et al.
- Discovery date: 2019

Designations
- Alternative names: S8386a

Orbital characteristics
- Semi-major axis: 21791300 km
- Eccentricity: 0.133
- Orbital period (sidereal): −1197.2 days
- Inclination: 171.0°
- Satellite of: Saturn
- Group: Norse group

Physical characteristics
- Mean diameter: 4 km
- Apparent magnitude: 24.9

S/2004 S 28 is a natural satellite of Saturn. Its discovery was announced by Scott S. Sheppard, David C. Jewitt, and Jan Kleyna on October 7, 2019, from observations taken between December 12, 2004, and March 21, 2007.

S/2004 S 28 is about 4 kilometres in diameter, and orbits Saturn at an average distance of 22.020 million km in 1220.31 days, at an inclination of 170° to the ecliptic, in a retrograde direction and with an eccentricity of 0.143.
