= Angrboda (moon) =

Moon of Saturn

Discovery
- Discovered by: Sheppard et al.
- Discovery date: 2019

Designations
- Pronunciation: /ˈɑːŋɡərboʊðə/ (with the PASTA vowel)
- Named after: Angrboða
- Alternative names: Saturn LV; S/2004 S 22; S8637a

Orbital characteristics
- Semi-major axis: 20379900 km
- Eccentricity: 0.257
- Orbital period (sidereal): −1080.4 days
- Inclination: 177.4°
- Satellite of: Saturn
- Group: Norse group

Physical characteristics
- Mean diameter: 3 km
- Apparent magnitude: 25.3
- Absolute magnitude (H): 16.1

Angrboda (Saturn LV), provisionally known as S/2004 S 22, is a natural satellite of Saturn. Its discovery was announced by Scott S. Sheppard, David C. Jewitt, and Jan Kleyna on October 7, 2019 from observations taken between December 12, 2004 and February 1, 2006. It was given its permanent designation in August 2021. On 24 August 2022, it was officially named after Angrboða, a jötunn in Norse mythology. She is the consort of Loki and the mother of the wolf Fenrir, the Midgard serpent Jörmungandr, and the ruler of the dead Hel.

Angrboda is about 3 kilometres in diameter, and orbits Saturn at an average distance of 20.636 million km in 1107.13 days, at an inclination of 177° to the ecliptic, in a retrograde direction and with an eccentricity of 0.251. With an absolute magnitude of 16.1, it is currently the faintest named moon of Saturn.
