= S/2006 S 20 =

Moon of Saturn

Discovery
- Discovered by: Scott S. Sheppard, David C. Jewitt, Jan Kleyna, Brett J. Gladman
- Discovery date: 2006

Orbital characteristics
- Semi-major axis: 13,193,800 km (8,198,200 mi)
- Eccentricity: 0.206
- Orbital period (sidereal): -1.553 yrs (567.27 d)
- Inclination: 173.1° (to the ecliptic)
- Satellite of: Saturn
- Group: Norse group (Phoebe)

Physical characteristics
- Mean diameter: 5 km
- Absolute magnitude (H): 15.7

S/2006 S 20 is a natural satellite of Saturn. Its discovery was announced by Scott S. Sheppard, Brett J. Gladman, Edward Ashton, David C. Jewitt and Jan Kleyna on May 23, 2023 from observations taken between January 5, 2006 and July 9, 2021.

S/2006 S 20 is about 5 kilometers in diameter, and orbits Saturn at an average distance of 13.193 million km in 563.89 days, at an inclination of 174.9°, in a retrograde direction and with an eccentricity of 0.206. S/2006 S 20 belongs to the Norse group and it could possibly be a Phoebe subgroup member like S/2006 S 9. S/2006 S 20 is likely to be a fragment piece that split off of Phoebe from a collision with an asteroid or another moon.
