= Aegir (moon) =

Moon of Saturn

Discovery
- Discovered by: S. Sheppard, D. Jewitt, J. Kleyna, and B. Marsden
- Discovery date: May 4, 2005

Designations
- Designation: Saturn XXXVI
- Pronunciation: /ˈaɪjɪər, ˈæɡɪər/ etc.
- Named after: Ægir
- Alternative names: S/2004 S 10

Orbital characteristics
- Semi-major axis: 20735000 km
- Eccentricity: 0.252
- Orbital period (sidereal): 1025.908 d
- Inclination: 166.7°
- Satellite of: Saturn
- Group: Norse group

Physical characteristics
- Mean diameter: 4 km
- Albedo: 0.06 (assumed)
- Spectral type: B–R = 1.30 ± 0.06
- Apparent magnitude: 24.4
- Absolute magnitude (H): 15.5

Aegir, also Saturn XXXVI (provisional designation S/2004 S 10), is a natural satellite of Saturn. Its discovery was announced by Scott S. Sheppard, David C. Jewitt, Jan Kleyna, and Brian G. Marsden on May 4, 2005, from observations taken between December 12, 2004, and March 11, 2005.

Aegir is about 4 kilometres in diameter, and orbits Saturn at an average distance of 19,618 Mm in 1025.908 days, at an inclination of 167° to the ecliptic (140° to Saturn's equator), in a retrograde direction and with an eccentricity of 0.237.

== Name ==
The moon was named in April 2007 after Ægir, a giant from Norse mythology, the personification of tranquil seas, the one who soothes storms away. He is a son of Fornjót, and brother of Logi (fire, flame) and Kári (wind). The exoplanet Epsilon Eridani b (Ægir) was also named after this figure in 2015. The generally accepted way to differentiate the moon from the exoplanet is to spell the moon with the letters "a" and "e" as two separate letters, but put them together for the exoplanet ("Æ"). If "Æ" cannot be used, it is recommended to spell the exoplanet "AEgir".

The name may be pronounced various ways. /ˈaɪjɪər/ (with the 'g' pronounced as a y-sound) approximates modern Norwegian and Icelandic. /ˈæɡɪər/ (with a hard 'g') approximates what the Old Norse may have sounded like, while the Latinized/spelling pronunciations /ˈiːdʒɪər/, /ˈɛdʒɪər/ and /ˈeɪdʒɪər/ are also found.
