= Saturn LXIV =

Moon of Saturn

Discovery
- Discovered by: Sheppard et al.
- Discovery date: 2019

Designations
- Alternative names: S/2004 S 34; S5613a2

Orbital characteristics
- Semi-major axis: 24358900 km
- Eccentricity: 0.267
- Orbital period (sidereal): −1412.5 days
- Inclination: 165.7°
- Satellite of: Saturn
- Group: Norse group

Physical characteristics
- Mean diameter: 3 km
- Apparent magnitude: 25.3

Saturn LXIV, provisionally known as S/2004 S 34, is a natural satellite of Saturn. Its discovery was announced by Scott S. Sheppard, David C. Jewitt, and Jan Kleyna on October 8, 2019, from observations taken between December 12, 2004, and March 21, 2007. It was given its permanent designation in August 2021.

Saturn LXIV is about 3 kilometres in diameter, and orbits Saturn at an average distance of 24.299 million km in 1,414.59 days, at an inclination of 166° to the ecliptic, in a retrograde direction, and with an eccentricity of 0.235.
