= Jarnsaxa (moon) =

Moon of Saturn

Discovery
- Discovered by: Scott S. Sheppard; David C. Jewitt; Jan T. Kleyna; Brian G. Marsden
- Discovery date: June 26, 2006

Designations
- Designation: Saturn L
- Pronunciation: /jɑːrnˈsæksə/
- Named after: Járnsaxa
- Alternative names: S/2006 S 6

Orbital characteristics
- Semi-major axis: 18811000 km
- Eccentricity: 0.216
- Orbital period (sidereal): −964.7 days
- Inclination: 163.3°
- Satellite of: Saturn
- Group: Norse group

Physical characteristics
- Mean diameter: 4 km
- Albedo: 0.06 (assumed)
- Apparent magnitude: 24.7
- Absolute magnitude (H): 15.6

Jarnsaxa, also known as Saturn L (provisional designation S/2006 S 6), is a natural satellite of Saturn. Its discovery was announced by Scott S. Sheppard, David C. Jewitt, Jan Kleyna, and Brian G. Marsden on June 26, 2006, from observations taken between January 5 and April 29, 2006.

Jarnsaxa is about 4 kilometres in diameter, and orbits Saturn at an average distance of 18,556.9 Mm in 943.784 days, at an inclination of 162.9° to the ecliptic (164.1° to Saturn's equator), in a retrograde direction and with an eccentricity of 0.1918. It is a member of the Norse group of irregular satellites.

It is named after Járnsaxa, a giantess in Norse mythology.
