= Saturn LVIII =

Moon of Saturn

Discovery
- Discovered by: Sheppard et al.
- Discovery date: 2019

Designations
- Alternative names: S/2004 S 26; S8353a

Orbital characteristics
- Semi-major axis: 26737800 km
- Eccentricity: 0.148
- Orbital period (sidereal): −1624.2 days (4.45 years)
- Inclination: 171.3°
- Satellite of: Saturn
- Group: Norse group

Physical characteristics
- Mean diameter: 4 km
- Apparent magnitude: 25.0

Saturn LVIII, provisionally known as S/2004 S 26, is the outermost numbered natural satellite of Saturn. Its discovery was announced by Scott S. Sheppard, David C. Jewitt, and Jan Kleyna on October 7, 2019 from observations taken between December 12, 2004 and March 21, 2007. It was given its permanent designation in August 2021.

Saturn LVIII is about 4 kilometres in diameter and orbits Saturn at an average distance of 26.676 million km (0.178 AU) in 1627.18 days, at an inclination of 171° to the ecliptic, in a retrograde direction and with an eccentricity of 0.165.
