= Thrymr (moon) =

Moon of Saturn

- Discovery images of Thrymr (circled) taken by the CFHT in September 2000

Discovery
- Discovery date: 2000

Designations
- Designation: Saturn XXX
- Pronunciation: /ˈθrɪmər/ THRIM-ər
- Named after: Thrymr
- Alternative names: S/2000 S 7
- Adjectives: Thrymian (/ˈθrɪmiən/ THRIM-ee-ən)

Orbital characteristics
- Semi-major axis: 20474000 km
- Eccentricity: 0.470
- Orbital period (sidereal): −1094.3 days
- Inclination: 176.0°
- Satellite of: Saturn
- Group: Norse group

Physical characteristics
- Mean radius: 4+50% −30% km
- Synodic rotation period: 38.79±0.25? h
- Albedo: 0.06 (assumed)
- Spectral type: C
- Apparent magnitude: 23.9
- Absolute magnitude (H): 14.3

Thrymr, or Saturn XXX, is a natural satellite of Saturn. It was discovered by Gladman and colleagues in 2000, and given the temporary designation S/2000 S 7. Its name comes from Norse mythology, where Thrymr is a Jotun.

Thrymr is about 8 kilometres in diameter, and orbits Saturn at an average distance of 20,810 Mm in 1120.809 days. It may have formed from debris knocked off Phoebe. The Thrymian orbit is retrograde, at an inclination of 175° to the ecliptic (151° to Saturn's equator) and with an eccentricity of 0.453. Like Ijiraq and Kiviuq, Thrymr's orbit overlaps strongly with Phoebe's such that it is likely to collide with it in the future.

Its rotation period is 38.79±0.25 hours, the slowest among the retrograde moons measured by Cassini–Huygens and the second-slowest after Tarqeq. Having two maxima and two minima in its light curve, it may therefore be a contact binary, although this is less likely than for Kiviuq and Bestla. The surface of Thrymr is gray in color and similar to those of Suttungr and Mundilfari, suggesting a common origin as fragments knocked off of Phoebe early in the Solar System's history. In particular, it may be part of the same dynamical family as Suttungr, though Saturn LXVII is probably more closely related.

Its name was announced in its oblique form Thrym in IAU Circular 8177. However, the IAU Working Group on Planetary System Nomenclature later decided to add the nominative suffix -r to the root Thrym.
