= Norse group =

Category of satellites of Saturn

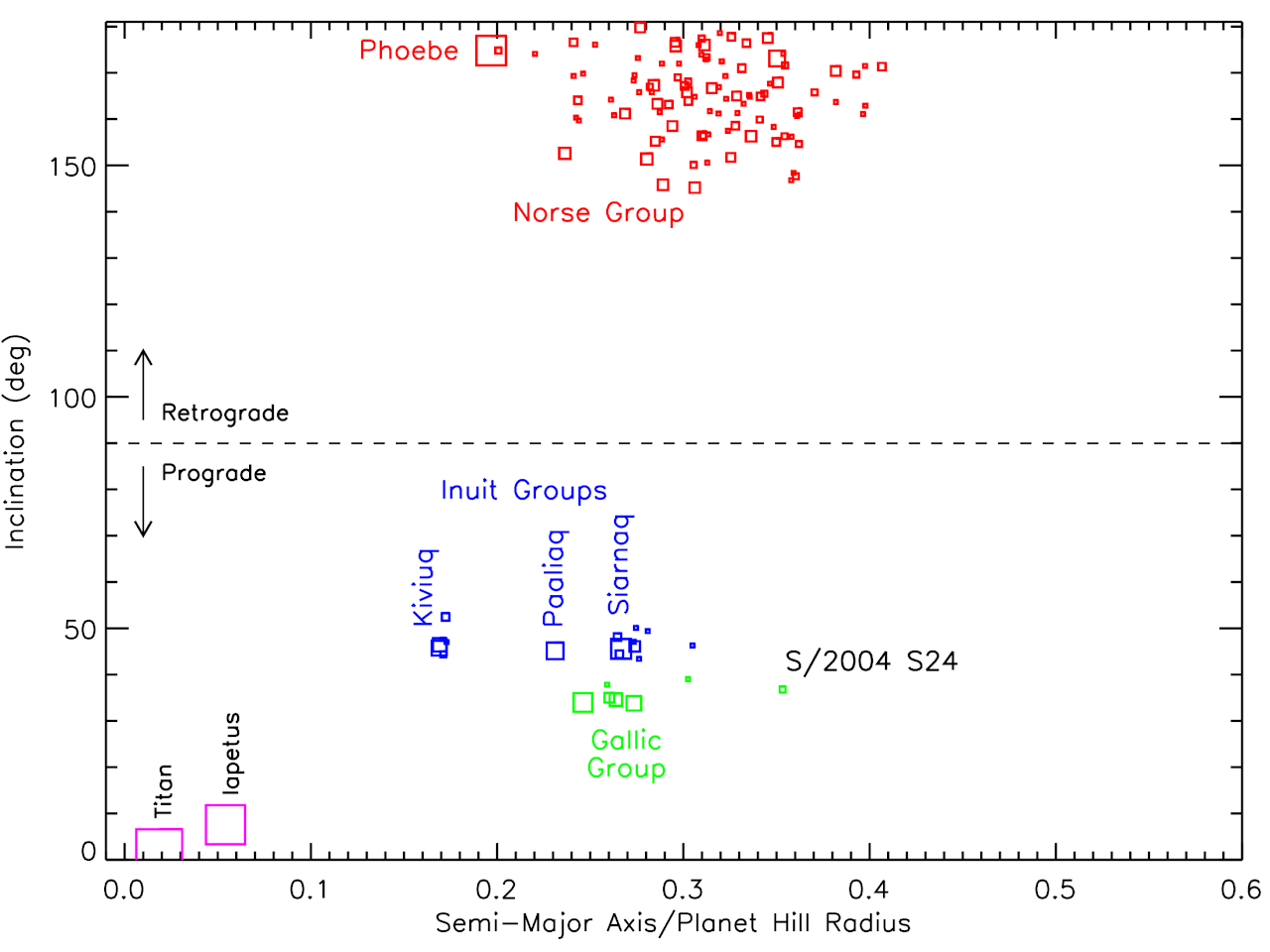
Diagram illustrating the orbits of the irregular satellites of Saturn, with major groups and moons labeled. The inclination and semi-major axis are represented on the Y and X-axis, respectively. The satellites with inclinations below 90° are prograde, those above 90° are retrograde. The X-axis is labeled in terms of Saturn's Hill radius.

The Norse group (or family or cluster; also simply referred to as the retrograde moons) comprises the retrograde irregular satellites of Saturn. They are unlikely to have a common origin as a single collisional family and their orbital parameters are very widely dispersed; more probably they are composed of a number of dynamical clusters with more homogeneous orbital and physical parameters. As of April 2026, there are 210 known members, making it by far the largest group of Saturn's confirmed moons. The Norse group is dominated by moons that are smaller in size, which could be indicative of a recent catastrophic collision event within the population.

== Naming ==
The International Astronomical Union (IAU) reserves names taken from Norse mythology (mostly giants) for the retrograde satellites of Saturn, hence the name Norse group. The term Norse group is only sometimes used as authors do not consider them to be dynamically related like a collisional family, and they may refer to them simply as the retrograde satellites. The exception to the moon naming scheme is Phoebe, whose name is taken from Greek mythology, which was discovered and named long before the others. Only 31 of the moons have names at present.

The discovery of 17 new satellites in this group was announced in October 2019. A team led by Scott S. Sheppard using the Subaru Telescope at Mauna Kea discovered 20 new moons, each about 5 kilometres (3 miles) in diameter. 17 of these fit into the Norse group, one of which was the most distantly orbiting satellite of Saturn known. A public naming contest for the satellites was announced, restricted to names from Norse mythology. Ten of the satellites received official names in August 2022.

== General characteristics ==
268 irregular moons of Saturn plotted by semi-major axis and inclination as of April 2026. The Norse group (left) is color-coded into four different subgroups proposed by Ashton et al.

Overall, their orbital elements are very broadly distributed, with inclinations between 136° and 178°. The retrograde irregular moons orbit at larger distances from Saturn on average than the prograde moons, which is a common trend for irregular satellite systems in general. The retrograde satellites were found to have generally faster rotation periods than the progrades; every prograde irregular measured had a rotation period longer than 10 hours, while most retrogrades had periods shorter than that. Dependencies between the rotation rates and the inclinations and semi-major axes were found as well.

The Saturnian irregular moon population has a steep size distribution, meaning it has a large proportion of small moons relative to larger ones. It has been suggested there was a recent catastrophic collision event that could explain the large number of small moons. The cause of the steep size distribution was later narrowed down solely to a specific section of the retrograde population, proposed as the "Mundilfari subgroup".

The role of Phoebe, as the largest irregular moon of Saturn, is significant. While it is unlikely for the entirety of the retrograde moons to be the collisional family of Phoebe, it is accepted that it should be involved in the plurality of impacts among the irregulars due to its large diameter. There are different hypotheses on what it implies for a potential collisional family. One argument is that members of the group would be later removed by impact with Phoebe due to sharing similar orbital elements, and therefore a surviving family is unlikely, while another viewpoint is that the high number of collision events involving it means some collisional family likely exists.

== Subcategorization ==
Several attempts have been made over an extended period to divide the retrograde satellites of Saturn into subcategories based on the satellites' orbital characteristics.

In their 2001 article reporting on the discovery of the first irregular moons around Saturn since that of Phoebe, Gladman et al. separated by inclination four of the five newly discovered retrograde satellites (later named Ymir, Thrymr, Mundilfari, and Suttungr) in a group with Phoebe called the "Phoebe group". They tentatively placed the last moon (Skathi) on its own due to its differing inclination, though Mundilfari's inclination also differed enough from the rest of the group to be questionable. A later study disputed Ymir's membership, determining that its colour and semi-major axis made it incompatible with having originated from Phoebe in a collision. They did not attempt to validate the membership of the other three moons.

In 2008, Nicholson et al. split the retrograde satellites into three groups, but made no attempt to justify their potential shared dynamic origins, simply roughly sorting them by inclination alone. Each group was centred on a moon and their inclination. Their groups were the Phoebe group with an inclination around 175° (Phoebe, Suttungr, Thrymr, Ymir, and Fornjot), the Mundilfari group with an inclination at 168° (Mundilfari, Saturn LXVII, Aegir, S/2004 S 12, S/2004 S 13, Hati, Fenrir, and S/2004 S 17), and the Skathi group with an inclination at 153° (Skathi, Narvi, Farbauti, Bergelmir, and Bestla). They did not provide exhaustive lists of all members in their groups, and commented that nine newly discovered satellites at the time all fell into their inclination groupings but did not specify which moons went into which groups.

Also in 2008, Turrini et al. pointed out that members from a potential Phoebe family would likely be collisionally removed by the moon itself, which argues against the existence of the family. As half of all potential collisions between irregular moons would involve Phoebe due to its large size, this produces a "sweeping effect" that they presumed was probably the cause of a lack of known moons with semi-major axes around Phoebe's. They proposed that it was not related to any of the other known irregular moons, noting that none of the other satellites had compatible colours. Using an algorithm called the Hierarchical Clustering Method, they found several retrograde "families", which did not cover all 27 of the known retrograde satellites at the time. A group was qualified as a viable family if it passed the condition that the members were close enough in their orbital elements to potentially have a shared collisional origin with realistic dispersion velocities (≤200 m/s). Six of these were found to be acceptably realistic. The six groups were:

- Bergelmir and S/2006 S 1
- Mundilfari, S/2004 S 13, and S/2004 S 17
- Kari and S/2006 S 3
- Aegir, S/2004 S 12, and Hati
- Fornjot, Loge, and Fenrir
- Narvi and Bestla

They also made larger groups of moons that merged multiple families and previously left-out moons that they called "clusters", that they said could be groups composed of multiple generations of collisional fragments. One of the clusters passed their acceptance criterion, "cluster A", which was composed of Mundilfari's group, Jarnsaxa, and Aegir's group.

Denk et al. (2018) decided to again split the retrograde moons into six families based on their orbital elements, similar to Turrini et al. They left out fewer moons but still did not put all 29 retrogrades known at the time in a group. Their groups were:

- Narvi and Bestla
- Greip, S/2007 S 3, Suttungr, and Thrymr
- S/2004 S 13, Mundilfari, Jarnsaxa, S/2004 S 17, Hati, S/2004 S 12, Aegir, and Saturn LXVII
- S/2006 S 1, Bergelmir, and Farbauti
- Kari and S/2006 S 3
- Fenrir, Surtur, Loge, Ymir, and Fornjot

Besides their main groups, they also speculated on links between Hyrrokkin and Greip, and between Thrymr and Saturn LXVII. They remarked that other than Phoebe being distinctly separate from all other moons, clustering in the retrogrades was not obvious.

Also in 2018, Holt et al. used a technique called cladistics to split the retrograde satellites, or what they called the "Phoebe Family", into two main parts. They separated the Norse group into two "subfamilies", which they named them the "Aegir subfamily" and the "Ymir subfamily", named after their largest members. The Aegir subfamily contained the following ten moons: Mundilfari, Jarnsaxa, Bergelmir, Suttungr, Farbauti, Aegir, Fornjot, S/2006 S 1, S/2007 S 2, and S/2007 S 3. The Ymir subfamily contained the following 16 moons: Skathi, S/2004 S 13, S/2004 S 17, Greip, Hyrrokkin, Hati, Ymir, Narvi, Surtur, S/2004 S 12, Skoll, Thrymr, Kari, S/2006 S 3, Bestla, and Saturn LXVII. Only three Norse moons were not in these two subfamilies: Phoebe, which was by itself, and Fenrir and Loge, which they linked together as a pair.

Ashton et al. (2021) chose to split off the Norse satellites with inclinations within 3° of Phoebe's into a "Phoebe subgroup", comprising 11 out of 46 total, and suggested that the remainder of the Norse group could likely be subdivided further. They based this on the fact that Phoebe by itself should be involved in half of all collisions between Saturn's irregular moons, and concluded that a collisional family resulting from these events could feasibly exist. Building off this work, Ashton et al. (2025) opted to distribute the Norse group into three subgroups, each named after their largest member, based on subtle features in the cumulative inclination distribution of the moons. Though they noted that defining the subgroups on inclination alone was likely to produce some interlopers that were put in the wrong subgroup, they also did not claim that every subgroup was representative of a collisional family. The subgroups proposed were:

- The "Phoebe subgroup", made up of 21 moons with inclinations greater than 172°. All of the moons in the identically named Phoebe subgroup in Ashton et al. (2021) ended up in the 2025 subgroup. It was deemed unlikely that this group originated from a single collision event. They noted a cluster of moons with semi-major axes around 20 million km that could be dynamically related, the moons with the lowest semi-major axes (S/2006 S 9, S/2006 S 20, S/2019 S 2, and S/2007 S 2) that could be related with Phoebe, and a cluster of four moons (Angrboda, Alvaldi, S/2019 S 13, and S/2004 S 46) that could be related to each other. They also highlighted Ymir's relative isolation within the subgroup.
- The "Mundilfari subgroup", made up of moons with inclinations between 157° and 172°. This inclination subgroup was distinguished because it had a significantly larger fraction of small moons than the others, possibly evidence of a recent collision. They also identified two moons that could be part of this subgroup instead of the Phoebe subgroup, S/2007 S 2 and Saturn LVIII.
- The "Kari subgroup", made up of 12 moons with inclinations between 151.7° and 157°. Most of the moons in this subgroup share a similar semi-major axis, besides a few with appreciably lower semi-major axes, possibly evidence of a collisional family.

The remaining five moons were denoted the low-inclination moons, but not a group per se, with inclinations less than 151.7°. They considered Narvi and S/2019 S 11 probably related, and Skathi and Hyrrokkin possibly related, with Bestla remaining alone.

== List ==
The following is a table of the members of the Norse group, along with their estimated diameters, their semi-major axes, eccentricities, and inclinations, and which subgroups they belong to according to various sources. Their subgroup is denoted by their primary moon or largest member and a unique colour. By default they are sorted in order of their announcement date.

List of natural satellites in the Norse group (Note: Cells marked with "-" denote moons that were known at the time of the study but deliberately not put in a group. Cells left blank indicate moons that were not discovered at the time of the study and do not go in a group.)
Moon	Diameter (km)	Orbital elements			Subgroups					
Moon	Diameter (km)	Semi-major axis (km)	Eccentricity	Inclination (°)	Gladman et al. (2001)	Nicholson et al. (2008) (Note: For the nine satellites mentioned but not explicitly grouped in the paper, they are sorted into their categories based on their stated inclination criteria and their cells are italicized.)	Turrini et al. (2008)	Denk et al. (2018)	Holt et al. (2018)	Ashton et al. (2025) (Note: For the 128 satellites not yet discovered at the time not included in the paper and the 18 satellites announced in 2026, they are sorted into their categories based on their stated inclination criteria and their cells are italicized.)
Phoebe	213	12929400	0.164	175.2	Phoebe	Phoebe	-	-	-	Phoebe
Ymir	19	22955600	0.338	172.3	Phoebe	Phoebe	-	Ymir	Ymir	Phoebe
Thrymr	8	20330500	0.467	175.0	Phoebe	Phoebe	-	Suttungr	Ymir	Phoebe
Skathi	8	15575400	0.281	151.6	-	Skathi	-	-	Ymir	-
Mundilfari	7	18588200	0.211	167.1	Phoebe	Mundilfari	Mundilfari	Mundilfari	Aegir	Mundilfari
Suttungr	7	19391900	0.116	175.7	Phoebe	Phoebe	-	Suttungr	Aegir	Phoebe
Narvi	7	19285000	0.441	142.2		Skathi	Narvi	Narvi	Ymir	-
Saturn LXVII	5	21327600	0.511	164.8		Mundilfari	-	Mundilfari	Ymir	Mundilfari
Fornjot	6	24936800	0.213	170.0		Phoebe	Fornjot	Ymir	Aegir	Mundilfari
Farbauti	5	20290700	0.249	156.2		Skathi	-	Bergelmir	Aegir	Kari
Aegir	6	20664400	0.255	166.1		Mundilfari	Aegir	Mundilfari	Aegir	Mundilfari
S/2004 S 12	4	19801000	0.337	164.7		Mundilfari	Aegir	Mundilfari	Ymir	Mundilfari
S/2004 S 13	4	18453700	0.265	169.0		Mundilfari	Mundilfari	Mundilfari	Ymir	Mundilfari
Bergelmir	5	19268100	0.145	158.8		Skathi	Bergelmir	Bergelmir	Aegir	Mundilfari
Hati	5	19695000	0.372	165.4		Mundilfari	Aegir	Mundilfari	Ymir	Mundilfari
Fenrir	4	22330800	0.137	164.5		Mundilfari	Fornjot	Ymir	-	Mundilfari
S/2004 S 17	4	19699000	0.162	167.9		Mundilfari	Mundilfari	Mundilfari	Ymir	Mundilfari
Bestla	7	20337800	0.486	138.3		Skathi	Narvi	Narvi	Ymir	-
Hyrrokkin	8	18340900	0.336	149.9		Skathi	-	-	Ymir	-
S/2006 S 1	5	18746300	0.105	156.1		Skathi	Bergelmir	Bergelmir	Aegir	Kari
Kari	6	22032100	0.469	153.0		Skathi	Kari	Kari	Ymir	Kari
S/2006 S 3	5	21353100	0.432	156.1		Skathi	Kari	Kari	Ymir	Kari
Greip	5	18380000	0.317	174.2		Phoebe	-	Suttungr	Ymir	Phoebe
Loge	5	22919200	0.191	168.1		Mundilfari	Fornjot	Ymir	-	Mundilfari
Jarnsaxa	6	19273500	0.218	163.0		Mundilfari	-	Mundilfari	Aegir	Mundilfari
Surtur	6	22748000	0.448	168.4		Mundilfari	-	Ymir	Ymir	Mundilfari
Skoll	5	17623400	0.463	159.4		Skathi	-	-	Ymir	Mundilfari
S/2007 S 2	5	15939100	0.232	174.0				-	Aegir	Phoebe
S/2007 S 3	5	19614400	0.150	173.8				Suttungr	Aegir	Phoebe
Gridr	4	19250600	0.187	163.9						Mundilfari
S/2004 S 21	4	23160900	0.394	153.2						Kari
Angrboda	4	20591500	0.216	177.7						Phoebe
Skrymir	4	21447400	0.437	175.6						Phoebe
Gerd	4	20947500	0.517	174.4						Phoebe
Saturn LVIII	5	26097500	0.147	172.9						Phoebe
Eggther	6	19844600	0.157	165.0						Mundilfari
S/2004 S 28	5	21865900	0.159	167.9						Mundilfari
Beli	4	20703700	0.087	158.9						Mundilfari
Gunnlod	4	21141800	0.251	160.4						Mundilfari
Thiazzi	4	23577500	0.511	158.8						Mundilfari
Saturn LXIV	4	24145800	0.279	168.3						Mundilfari
Alvaldi	6	21993800	0.238	177.4						Phoebe
S/2004 S 36	4	23390800	0.625	153.3						Kari
S/2004 S 37	4	15956300	0.448	158.2						Mundilfari
Geirrod	4	22259400	0.539	154.4						Kari
S/2004 S 39	4	23192400	0.100	165.9						Mundilfari
S/2004 S 40	4	16075600	0.297	169.2						Mundilfari
S/2006 S 9	3	14406700	0.249	173.0						Phoebe
S/2007 S 5	4	15835600	0.104	158.4						Mundilfari
S/2019 S 2	3	16560300	0.279	173.3						Phoebe
S/2019 S 3	4	17077400	0.248	166.9						Mundilfari
S/2020 S 2	3	17869000	0.152	170.7						Mundilfari
S/2019 S 4	3	17951900	0.408	170.1						Mundilfari
S/2004 S 41	4	18095400	0.301	165.7						Mundilfari
S/2004 S 42	4	18240700	0.158	165.7						Mundilfari
S/2006 S 10	3	18979900	0.151	161.6						Mundilfari
S/2007 S 6	3	18545000	0.168	166.5						Mundilfari
S/2019 S 5	3	19090100	0.216	158.8						Mundilfari
S/2004 S 43	4	18935700	0.432	171.1						Mundilfari
S/2004 S 44	5	19515400	0.129	167.7						Mundilfari
S/2004 S 45	4	19693700	0.551	154.0						Kari
S/2006 S 11	3	19711900	0.143	174.1						Phoebe
S/2004 S 46	3	20513800	0.249	177.2						Phoebe
S/2004 S 47	4	16050700	0.291	160.9						Mundilfari
S/2006 S 13	4	19953300	0.313	162.0						Mundilfari
S/2006 S 14	3	21062300	0.060	166.7						Mundilfari
S/2019 S 7	4	20185100	0.233	174.2						Phoebe
S/2019 S 8	4	20287400	0.311	172.8						Phoebe
S/2019 S 9	4	20359700	0.433	159.5						Mundilfari
S/2019 S 10	3	20700300	0.248	163.9						Mundilfari
S/2019 S 11	4	20664200	0.513	144.6						-
S/2019 S 12	4	20895000	0.476	167.1						Mundilfari
S/2019 S 13	3	20964500	0.318	177.3						Phoebe
S/2020 S 6	3	21253300	0.480	166.9						Mundilfari
S/2005 S 5	3	21364900	0.588	169.5						Mundilfari
S/2007 S 7	4	15931600	0.217	169.3						Mundilfari
S/2019 S 15	3	21191100	0.257	157.8						Mundilfari
S/2020 S 7	3	17394000	0.500	161.4						Mundilfari
S/2004 S 48	4	22137400	0.374	161.9						Mundilfari
S/2004 S 49	4	22399400	0.453	159.8						Mundilfari
S/2004 S 50	3	22345000	0.450	164.0						Mundilfari
S/2004 S 51	4	25207100	0.201	171.2						Mundilfari
S/2004 S 52	3	26446400	0.291	165.4						Mundilfari
S/2006 S 15	4	21799600	0.117	161.1						Mundilfari
S/2006 S 16	3	21721200	0.204	164.1						Mundilfari
S/2006 S 17	4	22384200	0.425	168.7						Mundilfari
S/2006 S 18	4	22760600	0.131	169.5						Mundilfari
S/2006 S 19	4	23800500	0.467	175.5						Phoebe
S/2019 S 16	3	23265200	0.250	162.0						Mundilfari
S/2019 S 17	4	22722700	0.546	155.5						Kari
S/2019 S 18	3	23139500	0.509	154.6						Kari
S/2019 S 19	3	23044400	0.458	151.8						Kari
S/2019 S 20	3	23677900	0.354	156.0						Kari
S/2020 S 8	3	21967200	0.252	161.8						Mundilfari
S/2020 S 9	4	25408700	0.531	161.4						Mundilfari
S/2004 S 53	4	23279800	0.240	162.6						Mundilfari
S/2007 S 9	4	20174600	0.360	159.3						Mundilfari
S/2019 S 21	4	26439500	0.155	171.9						Mundilfari
S/2020 S 10	3	25315300	0.296	165.6						Mundilfari
S/2006 S 20	5	13193700	0.206	173.1						Phoebe
S/2004 S 56	5	13670200	0.339	161.6						Mundilfari
S/2004 S 57	4	18150500	0.263	167.9						Mundilfari
S/2004 S 59	3	19170700	0.262	167.3						Mundilfari
S/2004 S 60	3	19517000	0.280	173.8						Phoebe
S/2004 S 61	4	20986900	0.466	168.4						Mundilfari
S/2006 S 21	3	14976500	0.204	169.8						Mundilfari
S/2006 S 22	3	15109500	0.246	172.0						Phoebe (Note: This moon's inclination of 172.0° is at the exact boundary between the Phoebe (i > 172°) and Mundilfari subgroups (172° > i > 157°). Because neither group's range is inclusive of the boundary value, S/2006 S 22 has been arbitrarily assigned to the Phoebe subgroup.)
S/2006 S 24	3	18210700	0.352	165.9						Mundilfari
S/2006 S 25	3	18572400	0.303	158.8						Mundilfari
S/2006 S 26	3	18619300	0.248	171.9						Mundilfari
S/2006 S 27	4	19205700	0.140	170.5						Mundilfari
S/2006 S 28	4	21955100	0.210	172.9						Phoebe
S/2006 S 29	3	25212100	0.239	156.2						Kari
S/2019 S 27	3	16267000	0.420	162.1						Mundilfari
S/2019 S 28	4	17496000	0.199	158.4						Mundilfari
S/2019 S 30	3	17709900	0.107	168.3						Mundilfari
S/2019 S 33	4	18696100	0.289	170.4						Mundilfari
S/2019 S 35	3	18557800	0.577	157.3						Mundilfari
S/2019 S 36	3	19903200	0.161	166.9						Mundilfari
S/2019 S 37	3	19996900	0.404	149.9						-
S/2019 S 38	3	21998400	0.399	163.0						Mundilfari
S/2019 S 39	3	23784500	0.098	174.5						Phoebe
S/2019 S 40	3	24087800	0.088	161.8						Mundilfari
S/2019 S 41	3	24493600	0.257	157.1						Mundilfari
S/2019 S 42	4	24111600	0.121	163.2						Mundilfari
S/2019 S 43	3	26664100	0.277	165.3						Mundilfari
S/2019 S 44	3	26796900	0.512	172.6						Phoebe
S/2020 S 14	3	16186200	0.313	161.7						Mundilfari
S/2020 S 16	3	16963400	0.405	167.3						Mundilfari
S/2020 S 17	4	17094200	0.378	148.9						-
S/2020 S 18	3	17777900	0.180	168.9						Mundilfari
S/2020 S 20	3	17997300	0.133	169.8						Mundilfari
S/2020 S 21	3	18862100	0.307	169.9						Mundilfari
S/2020 S 22	3	19443000	0.059	161.3						Mundilfari
S/2020 S 23	3	19801500	0.089	165.0						Mundilfari
S/2020 S 24	3	20618300	0.230	159.6						Mundilfari
S/2020 S 25	3	20763700	0.316	171.8						Mundilfari
S/2020 S 26	3	21264400	0.273	163.2						Mundilfari
S/2020 S 27	3	21802300	0.255	145.3						-
S/2020 S 28	3	21993700	0.474	160.1						Mundilfari
S/2020 S 29	3	22301400	0.047	169.1						Mundilfari
S/2020 S 30	3	21790700	0.601	154.2						Kari
S/2020 S 31	3	22457300	0.238	163.8						Mundilfari
S/2020 S 32	3	21884100	0.502	169.1						Mundilfari
S/2020 S 33	3	22922500	0.555	162.8						Mundilfari
S/2020 S 34	3	22435600	0.154	160.6						Mundilfari
S/2020 S 35	3	23030300	0.225	174.9						Phoebe
S/2020 S 36	3	22806200	0.336	168.8						Mundilfari
S/2020 S 37	3	23751800	0.344	174.8						Phoebe
S/2020 S 38	4	23583900	0.513	159.7						Mundilfari
S/2020 S 39	3	24262400	0.305	160.1						Mundilfari
S/2020 S 40	3	23785900	0.412	167.3						Mundilfari
S/2020 S 41	3	25876400	0.402	160.2						Mundilfari
S/2020 S 42	3	25329400	0.506	157.5						Mundilfari
S/2020 S 43	3	26657400	0.203	164.6						Mundilfari
S/2020 S 44	3	27259400	0.199	168.5						Mundilfari
S/2023 S 4	3	17764600	0.276	170.0						Mundilfari
S/2023 S 5	3	25583500	0.599	168.8						Mundilfari
S/2023 S 8	3	14018800	0.122	166.9						Mundilfari
S/2023 S 9	3	13167500	0.141	172.2						Phoebe
S/2023 S 10	3	15500200	0.302	163.0						Mundilfari
S/2023 S 11	3	14046100	0.300	170.9						Mundilfari
S/2023 S 12	3	15805900	0.601	168.8						Mundilfari
S/2023 S 13	3	15193000	0.179	168.5						Mundilfari
S/2023 S 14	3	16853000	0.497	171.6						Mundilfari
S/2023 S 15	3	18241300	0.549	161.9						Mundilfari
S/2023 S 16	3	17005300	0.270	162.6						Mundilfari
S/2023 S 20	3	17261000	0.442	136.5						-
S/2023 S 21	3	17755400	0.077	157.3						Mundilfari
S/2023 S 23	3	18783700	0.350	164.8						Mundilfari
S/2023 S 24	3	18351800	0.374	169.7						Mundilfari
S/2023 S 25	3	19136600	0.281	166.4						Mundilfari
S/2023 S 26	3	19894300	0.306	163.9						Mundilfari
S/2023 S 27	3	19820100	0.652	151.1						-
S/2023 S 28	3	19881000	0.575	168.7						Mundilfari
S/2023 S 29	3	20042400	0.141	172.2						Phoebe
S/2023 S 30	3	18238300	0.493	142.4						-
S/2023 S 31	3	20729200	0.182	163.0						Mundilfari
S/2023 S 32	2	20454400	0.037	169.8						Mundilfari
S/2023 S 33	3	21621900	0.665	155.8						Kari
S/2023 S 34	3	20803900	0.570	168.4						Mundilfari
S/2023 S 35	3	22269700	0.151	168.5						Mundilfari
S/2023 S 36	3	22230600	0.359	166.3						Mundilfari
S/2023 S 37	3	19889800	0.215	172.3						Phoebe
S/2023 S 38	3	12823500	0.909	149.2						-
S/2023 S 39	3	20824500	0.124	164.8						Mundilfari
S/2023 S 40	3	21065100	0.342	169.6						Mundilfari
S/2023 S 41	3	21286400	0.279	172.1						Phoebe
S/2023 S 42	3	21837000	0.059	166.7						Mundilfari
S/2023 S 43	3	22563900	0.264	170.3						Mundilfari
S/2023 S 44	3	19292400	0.434	167.4						Mundilfari
S/2023 S 45	3	23438400	0.633	157.4						Mundilfari
S/2023 S 46	3	24708900	0.336	143.2						-
S/2023 S 47	3	25102300	0.101	162.5						Mundilfari
S/2023 S 48	3	20029200	0.022	169.7						Mundilfari
S/2023 S 49	3	21766500	0.026	171.7						Mundilfari
S/2023 S 50	3	11656500	0.263	166.1						Mundilfari
S/2020 S 45	3	23507700	0.199	172.8						Phoebe
S/2020 S 46	3	18892100	0.207	167.3						Mundilfari
S/2020 S 47	3	21397400	0.564	146.1						-
S/2023 S 51	3	23431500	0.191	163.3						Mundilfari
S/2023 S 52	3	22528000	0.124	146.2						-
S/2023 S 53	3	17181100	0.103	171.2						Mundilfari
S/2023 S 57	2	20536100	0.245	168.0						Mundilfari
S/2023 S 58	2	17206000	0.093	169.6						Mundilfari
S/2023 S 59	2	20064000	0.467	169.5						Mundilfari
S/2023 S 60	2	17493700	0.206	170.7						Mundilfari
S/2023 S 61	3	18067700	0.557	158.0						Mundilfari
S/2023 S 62	2	14025900	0.467	155.6						Kari
S/2023 S 63	4	18482600	0.266	165.0						Mundilfari
