= Bestla (moon) =

Moon of Saturn

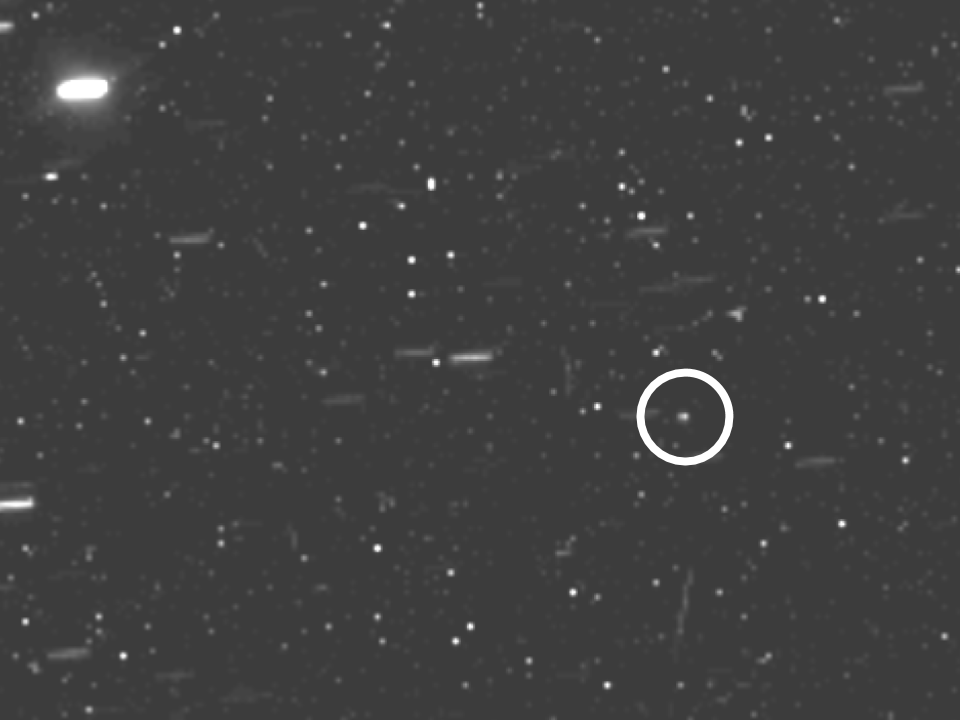
- Bestla imaged by the Cassini spacecraft in September 2015

Discovery
- Discovered by: Scott S. Sheppard; David C. Jewitt; Jan T. Kleyna; Brian G. Marsden
- Discovery date: 2004

Designations
- Designation: Saturn XXXIX
- Pronunciation: /ˈbɛstlə/
- Named after: Bestla
- Alternative names: S/2004 S 18

Orbital characteristics
- Semi-major axis: 20337800 km
- Eccentricity: 0.486
- Orbital period (sidereal): −1082.94 days
- Inclination: 138.3°
- Satellite of: Saturn
- Group: Norse group

Physical characteristics
- Dimensions: 15.56 × 7 × 5.98 km (Note: Assuming the medium axis is equal to the diameter calculated from the assumed albedo.)
- Mean diameter: 7+50% −30% km
- Synodic rotation period: −14.6238±0.0001 h
- Pole ecliptic latitude: −85°±15°
- Albedo: 0.06 (assumed)
- Spectral type: g – r = 0.72 ± 0.07, r – i = 0.38 ± 0.07
- Apparent magnitude: 23.8
- Absolute magnitude (H): 14.6

Bestla /ˈbɛstlə/ or Saturn XXXIX is a retrograde irregular moon of Saturn. Its discovery was announced by Scott S. Sheppard, David C. Jewitt, Jan Kleyna, and Brian G. Marsden on 4 May 2005, from observations taken between 13 December 2004 and 5 March 2005.

== Description ==
Bestla is about 7 kilometres in diameter, and orbits Saturn at an average distance of 20,337,900 km in 1087 days, at an inclination of 136° to the ecliptic, in a retrograde direction and with an eccentricity of 0.461. Early observations from 2005 suggested that Bestla had a very high eccentricity of 0.77. Like many of the outer irregular moons of the giant planets, Bestla's eccentricity may vary as a result of the Kozai mechanism. Bestla rotates in a retrograde direction and makes a full rotation every 14.6238±0.0001 hours. Like Kiviuq, it is likely to be a contact binary or binary object, as its light curve has strong variation in brightness and a plateau-like maximum not seen in the other irregulars.

== Name ==
This moon was named in April 2007 after Bestla, a frost giantess from Norse mythology, who is a mother of Odin.
