= Ymir (moon) =

Moon of Saturn

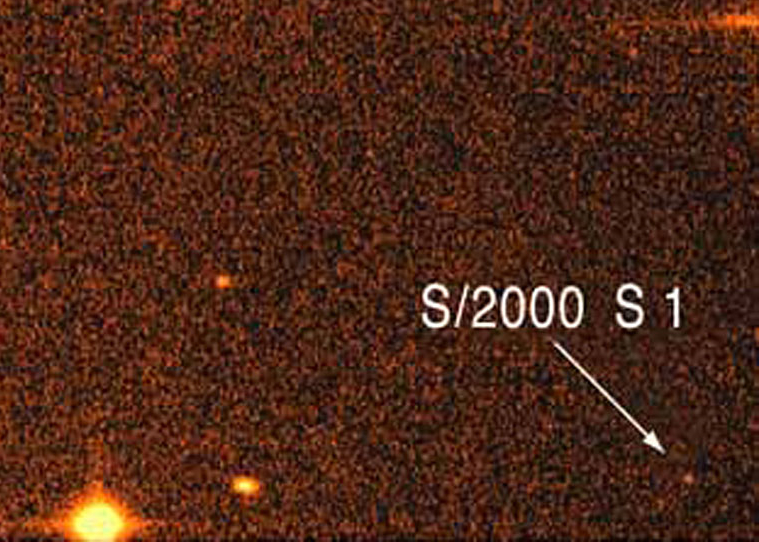
- Discovery image of Ymir taken by the La Silla Observatory in August 2000

Discovery
- Discovered by: Brett J. Gladman
- Discovery site: Observatoire de la Cote d'Azur
- Discovery date: 2000

Designations
- Designation: Saturn XIX
- Pronunciation: /ˈiːmɪər/, /ˈɪmɪər/
- Named after: Ymir
- Alternative names: S/2000 S 1
- Adjectives: Ymirian /ɪˈmɪəriən/ (Note: Because the -r is an inflectional ending, and the oblique stem is Ymi (as in Modern Norse Yme), one might expect the English adjective to be ?Ymian, but that is perhaps too short a word to be easily intelligible.)

Orbital characteristics
- Epoch 2000 January 1.5
- Semi-major axis: 22955600 km
- Eccentricity: 0.338
- Orbital period (sidereal): −3.56 years (−1,298.6819 d)
- Inclination: 172.3°
- Satellite of: Saturn
- Group: Norse group

Physical characteristics
- Dimensions: 24 × 22 × 16 km (Note: Modeled using the diameter calculated from the assumed albedo.)
- Mean diameter: 19+50% −30% km
- Circumference: 65 km (equatorial)
- Synodic rotation period: −11.92220±0.00002 h
- North pole right ascension: 100°±20° (Note: Assuming the north pole is the one pointing north of the invariable plane, in accordance with IAU standards.)
- North pole declination: −70°±10°
- Albedo: <0.15 <0.10 (likely); 0.06 (assumed)
- Spectral type: D/P
- Apparent magnitude: 21.7
- Absolute magnitude (H): 12.3

Ymir, or Saturn XIX, is the second-largest retrograde irregular moon of Saturn.

== Discovery and naming ==
It was discovered by Brett J. Gladman, et al. in 2000, and given the temporary designation S/2000 S 1. Joint with Paaliaq, its discovery in 2000 was the first detection of an irregular moon of Saturn after Phoebe, discovered a century earlier.

It was named in August 2003 after Ymir, who in Norse mythology is the ancestor of all the Jotuns or frost giants.

Ymir imaged by the CFHT on 23 September 2000

== Orbit ==
The average distance from Ymir to Saturn is approximately 23 million kilometers. This gives it one of Saturn's largest known satellite orbits, with a period of 3.6 years, moving in a retrograde direction. Its orbital inclination is 173° to the ecliptic, and its eccentricity is 0.337. Its orbit changes continuously due to solar and planetary perturbations.

Due to its orbital inclination, Ymir belongs to the Phoebe subgroup, a retrograde group of moons that orbit Saturn at a distance of 13 million to 27 million kilometers, have orbital inclinations between 172.5 and 180, and have eccentricities of about 0.1 and 0.5.

== Physical characteristics ==
Ymir's diameter is estimated at 19 km, assuming an albedo of 6%. Of the moons that take more than 3 Earth years to orbit Saturn, Ymir is the largest. Ymir is also the second largest member of the Norse group, after Phoebe. Spectral measurements from Cassini–Huygens show that Ymir is reddish in color, unlike Phoebe's, which is colored grey.

Ymir rotates in a retrograde direction about once every 11.9 hours.

Ymir shows a similar light curve as Siarnaq and therefore has a triangular shape, and it could be a possible contact binary, as most of its measured light curves show very large brightness variations.

== Origin ==
Ymir probably did not form near Saturn but was captured by Saturn later. Like the other members of the Norse group, which have similar orbits, Ymir is probably the remnant of a broken, captured heliocentric asteroid.

However, due to its color and different track characteristics, it is suggested that there could be a separate origin for Ymir.

== Exploration ==
Ymir was observed by the Cassini spacecraft between 2005 and 2017, during which its light curve was measured and its rotation period determined.
