= Suttungr (moon) =

Moon of Saturn

- Discovery images of Suttungr (circled) taken by the CFHT in September 2000

Discovery
- Discovery date: 2000

Designations
- Designation: Saturn XXIII
- Pronunciation: /ˈsʊtʊŋər/
- Named after: Suttungr
- Alternative names: S/2000 S 12
- Adjectives: Suttung /ˈsʊtʊŋ/, Suttungian /sʊˈtʊŋiən/

Orbital characteristics
- Semi-major axis: 19459000 km
- Eccentricity: 0.114
- Orbital period (sidereal): −1016.7 days
- Inclination: 175.8°
- Satellite of: Saturn
- Group: Norse group

Physical characteristics
- Mean diameter: 7+50% −30% km
- Synodic rotation period: 7.67±0.02 h
- Albedo: 0.06 (assumed)
- Spectral type: C
- Apparent magnitude: 23.9
- Absolute magnitude (H): 14.5

Suttungr, or Saturn XXIII, is a natural satellite of Saturn. It was discovered by Brett J. Gladman, et al. in 2000, and given the temporary designation S/2000 S 12. It was named for Suttungr in Norse mythology, a Jötunn or giant who once owned the mead of poetry.

Suttungr is about 7 kilometres in diameter, and orbits Saturn at an average distance of 19,667 Mm in 1029.703 days. It may have formed from debris knocked off Phoebe. The Suttung orbit is retrograde, at an inclination of 174° to the ecliptic (151° to Saturn's equator) and with an eccentricity of 0.131. Its rotation period is 7.67±0.02 hours, and like Albiorix its light curve exhibits two minima at certain angles, and three minima at others. Having a similar gray color and orbit as Thrymr, the two moons may be members of the same dynamical family.

Its name was announced in its oblique form Suttung in IAU Circular 8177. However, the IAU Working Group on Planetary System Nomenclature later decided to add the nominative suffix -r to the base form Suttung.
