= Sköll =

Wolf in Norse mythology

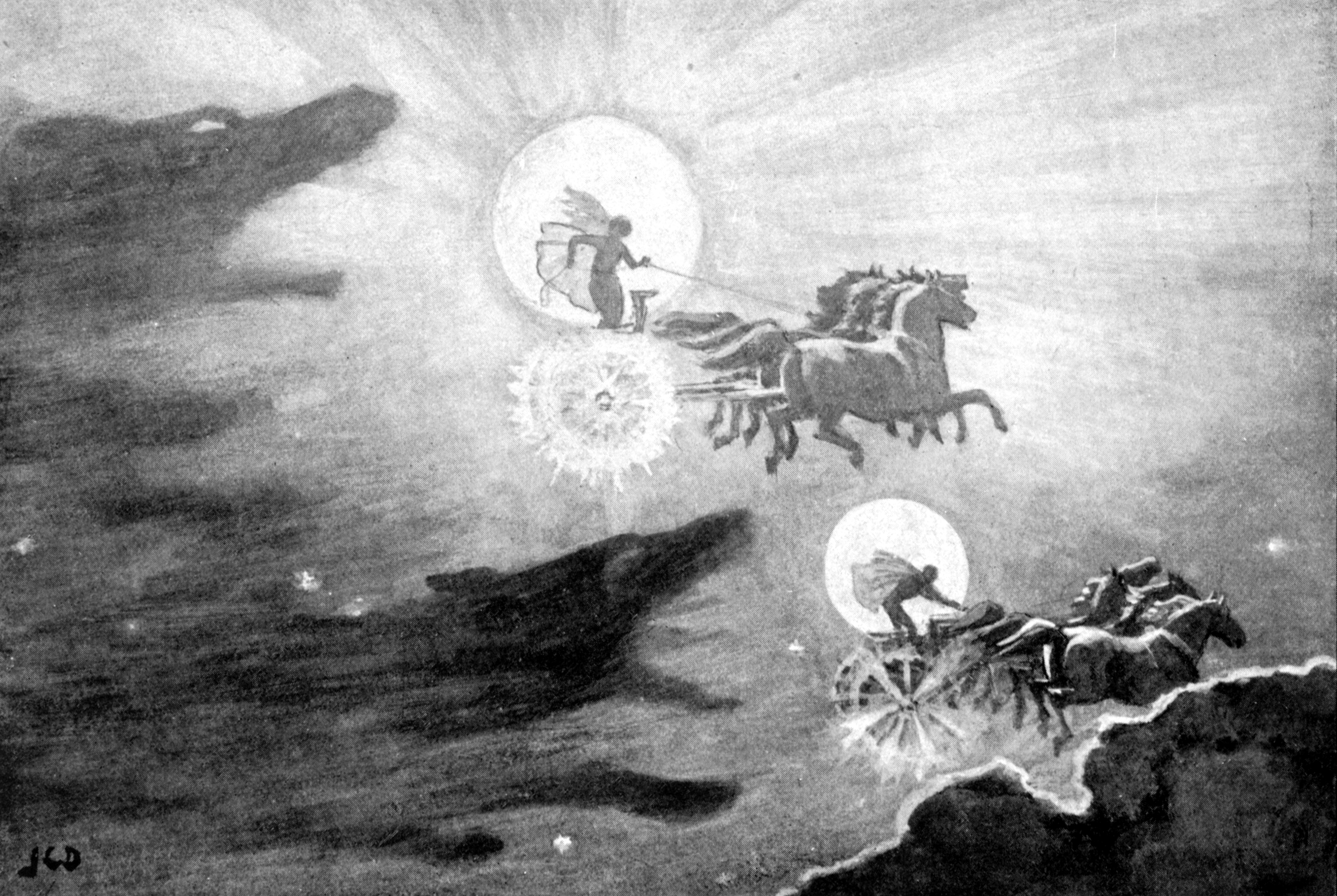
The Wolves Pursuing Sól and Máni by J. C. Dollman, 1909

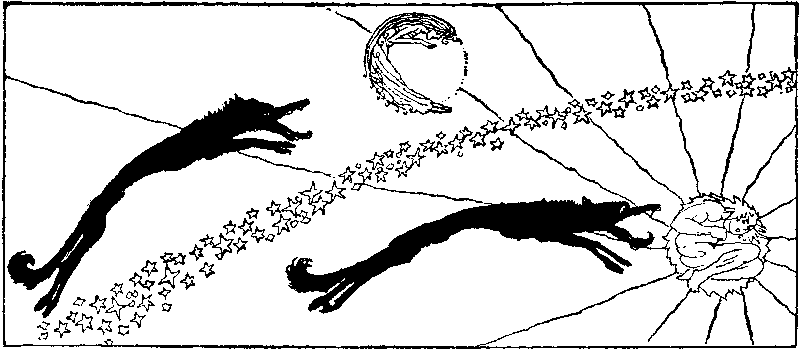
Far away and long ago by Willy Pogany, 1920

In Norse mythology, Sköll, or Skoll (Old Norse: Skǫll), is a wolf that, according to Snorri Sturluson's Prose Edda, chases the Sun (personified as a goddess, Sól) riding her chariot across the sky. Hati Hróðvitnisson chases the Moon (personified, as Máni) during the night. Sköll and Hati are the sons of the wolf Fenrir, and an unnamed giantess. It is foretold the wolves will chase the Sun and Moon across the skies until Ragnarök, at which point the wolves catch up and devour the celestial beings.

== Etymology ==
Old Norse Skǫll has been translated as "Treachery" or "Mockery". The noun skǫll f. is the feminine form of skall Template:Ngen ("bark, widely audible (echoing) sound"), related to skjalla, skella, "to bark; to scold" (cf. Swedish: skäll, "scolding; barking", skall, "bark"), by extension also English "scold" (cf. Danish: skæld).

== The Prose Edda ==
In Snorri Sturluson's Prose Edda, the mention of Sköll appears when describing the story of Sol, who drives the chariot of the Sun in Norse Mythology. The wolf is seen chasing her after she receives her chariot to carry the Sun. "[Sun] goes at a great pace; her pursuer is close behind her and there is nothing she can do but flee. … There are two wolves and the one pursuing her is called Skoll [Treachery] is the one she fears; he will catch her [at the end of the world]."

== Theories ==
According to Rudolf Simek, it is possible that Sköll is another name for Fenrir, and, if so, "there could be a nature-mythological interpretation in the case of Sköll and Hati (who pursues the moon). Such an interpretation suggests the wolves may be intended to describe the phenomenon of parhelia and paraselenae or Sun dogs and Moon dogs, as these are called 'sun-wolf' in Scandinavian languages (Norwegian solulv, Swedish solvarg)." Rudolf Simek theorizes that Sköll, Hati, and Fenrir are one and the same, deriving from the Hyades star cluster found in the constellation Taurus. The stars form a "V" shape that could have easily been interpreted as the mouth of a wolf.

== See also ==
- Ketu
- List of wolves
- Rahu

== General and cited references ==
- Orchard, Andy (1997). Dictionary of Norse Myth and Legend. Cassell. ISBN 0-304-34520-2.
- Simek, Rudolf (2007). Translated by Angela Hall. Dictionary of Northern Mythology. D.S. Brewer. ISBN 0-85991-513-1.
