= Hati Hróðvitnisson =

Wolf in Norse mythology

- Norse mythology character
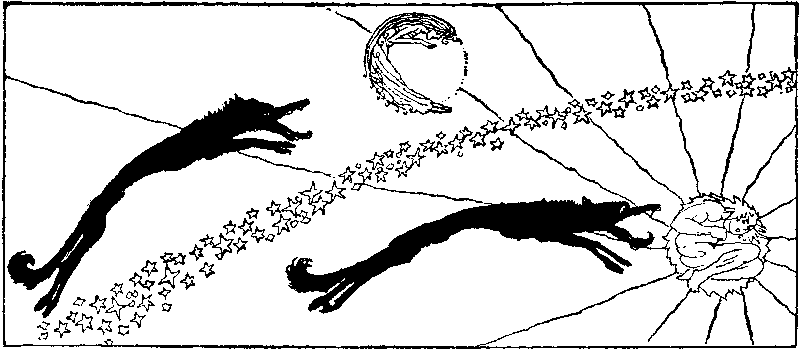
- "Far away and long ago" (1920) by Willy Pogany.

In-universe information
- Alias: Mánagarmr
- Species: Wolf
- Family: Fenrir (father)

In Norse mythology, Hati Hróðvitnisson (first name meaning "He Who Hates", or "Enemy") is a wolf that, according to Snorri Sturluson's Prose Edda, chases Máni, the Moon, across the night sky, just as the wolf Sköll chases Sól, the Sun, during the day, until the time of Ragnarök, when they will swallow these heavenly bodies. Snorri also gives another name for a wolf who swallows the Moon, Mánagarmr ([ˈmɑːnɑˌɡɑrmz̠], "Moon-Hound", or "Moon's Dog").

Hati's patronymic Hróðvitnisson, attested in both the Eddic poem "Grímnismál" and the Gylfaginning section of the Prose Edda, indicates that he is the son of Fenrir, for whom Hróðvitnir ("Famous Wolf") is an alternate name. According to Snorri, Hati's mother is the giantess, not named but mentioned in the Eddic poem "Völuspá", who dwells to the east of Midgard in the forest of Járnviðr ("Ironwood") and "fosters Fenrir's kin". Snorri states that this giantess and witch bears many giants for sons, all in the form of wolves, including Hati and Sköll, who is thus implied to be Hati's brother. In two verses of "Völuspá" that Snorri cites, an unnamed son of this giantess is prophesied to snatch the Moon, and also eat the flesh of the dead, spattering the heavens with blood. In contrast the Eddic poem "Vafþrúðnismál" states that Fenrir himself will destroy the sun.

== Mánagarmr ==
Snorri also names a wolf named Mánagarmr ("Moon-Hound", or "Moon's Dog") as the most powerful of the giantess's progeny, and goes on to say that he will swallow the Moon and gorge on the dead. This is presumably an alternate name for Hati or Sköll that Snorri took from folklore. It can be anglicized as Managarm, Manegarm, Mánagarm or Managarmr.

== See also ==
- Ketu
- List of wolves
- Rahu
