= Mundilfari (moon) =

Moon of Saturn

- Discovery images of Mundilfari (circled) taken by the CFHT in September 2000

Discovery
- Discovered by: Gladman et al.
- Discovery date: 2000

Designations
- Designation: Saturn XXV
- Pronunciation: Icelandic: [ˈmʏntɪlvarɪ] (Note: The name is also found as Mundilföri ~ Mundilfœri. This would correspond to modern Icelandic Mundilfæri [ˈmʏntɪlvairɪ].)
- Named after: Mundilfari
- Alternative names: S/2000 S 9

Orbital characteristics
- Semi-major axis: 18590300 km
- Eccentricity: 0.210
- Orbital period (sidereal): −952.95 days
- Inclination: 168.4°
- Satellite of: Saturn
- Group: Norse group

Physical characteristics
- Dimensions: 11.78 × 7 × 5.86 km (Note: Modeled using the diameter calculated from the assumed albedo.)
- Mean diameter: 7+50% −30% km
- Mean density: ≳0.3–0.5 g/cm^{3}
- Synodic rotation period: 6.74±0.08 hours
- Albedo: 0.06 (assumed)
- Spectral type: P
- Apparent magnitude: 23.8
- Absolute magnitude (H): 14.5

Mundilfari, or Saturn XXV, is a natural satellite of Saturn. It was discovered by Brett J. Gladman et al. in 2000, and given the temporary designation S/2000 S 9. Mundilfari is about 7 kilometers in diameter, and orbits Saturn at an average distance of 18,5903 Mm in 952.95 days, an averaged eccentricity of 0.210, and at an inclination of 168.4° to the ecliptic in a retrograde sense (compared to Saturn's orbit around the Sun).

Mundilfari may have formed from debris knocked off Phoebe by large impacts at some point in the Solar System's history, but it is on an orbit sufficiently different from Phoebe that this may be difficult to reconcile. With a spectral slope of −5.0%/100, Mundilfari is the bluest of all the moons studied by Grav and Bauer (2007), slightly more so than Phoebe (−2.5%/100 nm) and about as blue as Erriapus (+5.1%/100 nm) is red. Its rotation period is 6.74±0.08 hours, the second-fastest among all the irregular moons studied by Cassini–Huygens after Hati, and it appears to be very elongated in shape.

It was named in August 2003 from Norse mythology, where Mundilfari is the father of the goddess Sól (Sun) and the god Máni (Moon).

Mundilfari is the largest remaining fragment of an eponymous sub-group of small retrograde irregular moons, which belongs to the Norse group.
