= Brian G. Marsden =

British astronomer (1937–2010)

Brian Geoffrey Marsden
- Born: August 5, 1937; Cambridge, England
- Died: November 18, 2010 (aged 73); Burlington, Massachusetts, US
- Education: New College, Oxford; Yale University
- Known for: Minor Planet Center
- Scientific career
- Thesis: The motions of the Galilean satellites of Jupiter (1966)
- Doctoral advisor: Dirk Brouwer

Brian Geoffrey Marsden (5 August 1937 – 18 November 2010) was a British astronomer and the longtime director of the Minor Planet Center (MPC) at the Center for Astrophysics | Harvard & Smithsonian (director emeritus from 2006 to 2010).

== Education ==
Marsden was educated at The Perse School in Cambridge, New College, Oxford (BA and MA) and Yale University (PhD). His thesis advisor was Dirk Brouwer.

== Life ==
Marsden specialized in celestial mechanics and astrometry, collecting data on the positions of asteroids and comets and computing their orbits, often from minimal observational information and providing their future positions on International Astronomical Union (IAU) circulars. In addition to serving as MPC director since 1978, he served as the director of the Central Bureau for Astronomical Telegrams (CBAT) from 1968 to 1999. He was president of IAU Commission 6 (2000–2003) and Commission 20 (1976–1979).

Marsden helped to recover once lost asteroids and lost comets. Some asteroid and comet discoveries of previous decades were "lost" because not enough observational data had been obtained at the time to determine a reliable enough orbit to know where to look for identification at future dates. Occasionally, a newly discovered object turns out to be a rediscovery of a previously lost object, which can be determined by calculating its orbit backwards into the past and matching calculated positions with the previously recorded positions of the lost object. In the case of comets this is especially tricky because of forces other than gravity that can affect their orbits (one of which is emission of jets of gas from the comet nucleus), but Marsden has specialized in calculating such forces. Notably, he successfully predicted the 1992 return of the once-lost Comet Swift-Tuttle.

In May 1993, Marsden concluded that the trajectory of Comet Shoemaker-Levy 9 would put it onto a course to collide with Jupiter in July 1994, marking the first ever time that a cometary-planetary impact was successfully predicted.

In 1998, he calculated that an asteroid, (35396) 1997 XF11 had a small probability of striking the Earth in 2028. Marsden chose to issue a press release, which Robert Roy Britt called a false alarm.

"... astronomers created a media storm by announcing that an asteroid could collide with Earth in 2028, only to revise the estimates hours later."—Gretchen Vogel, Science, 20 March 1998

Other asteroid researchers demonstrated within hours that the computation was in error. Marsden himself admitted the announcement was a strategy which needed "rethinking", and NASA asked astronomers not to sound a public alarm like that again but to communicate with each other. He took some criticism for publicizing this prediction at the same time that movie companies were publicizing films like Deep Impact (see also Science by press conference). However, Marsden justified his actions with the argument that the problem of detecting asteroids needs more attention:

"Much as the incident was bad for my reputation, we needed a scare like that to bring attention to this problem." (Scientific American magazine, 2003)

Follow-up work determined that an impact would be unlikely.

He once proposed that Pluto should be cross-listed as both a planet and a minor planet and assigned the asteroid number 10000; however, this proposal was not accepted. A similar proposal was, however, finally accepted in 2006 when Pluto was designated minor planet 134340 and also declared a dwarf planet.

Marsden campaigned to reclassify Pluto as one of the newly discovered and rapidly growing class of Trans-Neptunian objects, the discovery of which was made possible by CCD-array detectors and dedicated surveys or incidental discoveries of these objects with relatively large telescopes. Partly at his urging, the International Astronomical Union voted at a meeting in Prague in 2006 to designate Pluto and three asteroids “dwarf planets.”, which are objects that have not dynamically cleared their orbits of other debris (except, e.g., for collections of objects in stable dynamic libration at the "Lagrange-points", the libration points L4 and L5 of large, classical planets, as in the case of the Jovian "Trojan" asteroids). he died of leukemia in 2010.

Asteroids discovered: 1
37556 Svyaztie	Aug 28, 1982	with N. S. Chernykh	MPC

== Family ==
He married Nancy Lou Zissell; they had a daughter, Cynthia, and a son, Jonathan. He named minor planet 2298 Cindijon after them. Brian credited his mother for inspiring his interest in astronomy when she showed him the partial solar eclipse of September 10, 1942; that the date and time could be projected far in advance very much impressed him.

== Honours ==
Awards

- Merlin Medal and Gift of the British Astronomical Association (1965)
- Walter Goodacre Medal of the British Astronomical Association (1979)
- George Van Biesbroeck Prize of the American Astronomical Society (1989)
- Brouwer Award of the Division on Dynamical Astronomy of the American Astronomical Society (1995)
- Royal Astronomical Society Award for Service to Astronomy and Geophysics (2006)
- Member of the Norwegian Academy of Science and Letters.

Named after him

- Asteroid 1877 Marsden
- Marsden Group of sun-grazing comets
