= Jan Kleyna =

British astronomer

Jan T. Kleyna /ˌdʒæn ˈkliːnə/ is a postdoctoral astronomy researcher at the University of Hawaiʻi Institute for Astronomy. His area of interest is galaxy dynamics, and he has worked to develop codes for the real-time detection of moving objects such as Jovian satellites. He has also co-discovered several of Saturn's moons.
