= David C. Jewitt =

British-American astronomer (born 1958)

David Jewitt
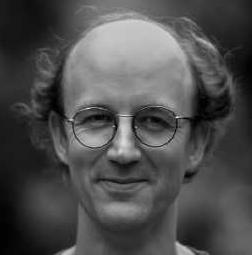
- Born: 1958 (age 67–68); London, England
- Education: University College London
- Known for: Discovery of the first body in the Kuiper belt
- Awards: Shaw Prize (2012); Kavli Prize (2012); Prix Jules Janssen (2026)
- Scientific career
- Fields: Astronomy, astrophysics
- Workplaces: UCLA
- Thesis: (1983)
- Doctoral advisor: James Westphal

David Clifford Jewitt (born 1958) is a British astronomer who studies the Solar System, especially its minor bodies. He is based at the University of California, Los Angeles, where he is a Member of the Institute for Geophysics and Planetary Physics, the Director of the Institute for Planets and Exoplanets, Professor of Astronomy in the Department of Physics and Astronomy and Professor of Astronomy in the Department of Earth, Planetary and Space Sciences. He is best known for being the first person (along with Jane Luu) to discover a body beyond Pluto and Charon in the Kuiper belt.

== Early life ==
Jewitt was born in London, England, in 1958. His mother was a telephonist, and his father worked on an assembly line making industrial steel cutters. The family lived with Jewitt's grandmother in a social housing project in the north London suburb of Tottenham.

Jewitt's interest in astronomy was kindled in 1965, when he chanced to see some bright meteors. Media coverage of NASA's Apollo 8 and Apollo 11 lunar missions in 1968 and 1969 added to his enthusiasm. His own exploration of outer space began with a tabletop 40 mm refracting telescope that his grandparents gave him as a birthday present. Upgrading to a 150 mm reflector built by his uncle Malcolm and then a homemade 250 mm instrument, Jewitt became a serious amateur astronomer while still a schoolboy. He joined the Transient lunar phenomenon subsection of the Lunar Section of the British Astronomical Association, and regularly contributed reports of his observations to the Section's circular.

== Education ==
Jewitt was educated at local authority primary and secondary schools. He was also an autodidact, borrowing books from a travelling library to supplement the few that his parents could afford to buy for him. His interest in physics began when a teacher introduced him to the subject, of which he had never previously heard, when he was twelve or thirteen.

In 1976, supported by a local authority grant, Jewitt enrolled at University College London to take courses in astronomy, physics, mathematics, computing, electronics, metalwork and technical drawing, studying both at UCL's Gower Street campus and at the UCL Observatory (then called the University of London Observatory) in Mill Hill. The module that he enjoyed most was a panoramic survey of physics delivered by the Christian, Rolls-Royce-driving space scientist Professor Sir Robert Boyd. Together with his friend, the future poet and environmental activist Roly Drower, Jewitt graduated with a first class honours B.Sc. in astronomy in 1979.

Following the advice of UCL's Professor Michael Dworetsky, Jewitt decided to pursue his postgraduate studies at the California Institute of Technology in Pasadena. He became an Anthony Fellow at Caltech in 1979, achieving an M.S. in planetary science in 1980. After investigating planetary nebulae and comets with the 200 inch Hale Telescope of the Mount Palomar Observatory, working with Ed Danielson and Gerry Neugebauer under the supervision of Professor James Westphal, he was awarded a Ph.D. in planetary science and astronomy in 1983. He has recalled his adventures in the Hale's vertiginous prime focus cage as occasionally a risk to life and limb.

== Career ==
In 1983, Jewitt became an assistant professor at the Massachusetts Institute of Technology in Cambridge, Massachusetts. In 1988, attracted by the powerful telescopes sited on Mauna Kea, he moved to the University of Hawaiʻi, becoming an Associate Astronomer in its Institute of Astronomy and an associate professor in its Department of Physics and Astronomy. In 1993, the Institute promoted him to the rank of Astronomer tout court.

In 2009, Jewitt returned to the American mainland to work at the University of California, Los Angeles, becoming a Member of UCLA's Institute of Geophysics and Planetary Physics and a professor in what was then its Department of Earth and Space Sciences. In 2010 he was given a second chair, becoming a professor in UCLA's Department of Physics and Astronomy. In 2011, he became the Director of UCLA's Institute for Planets and Exoplanets.

== Research ==
Jewitt's research interests have embraced many topics in planetary science, including the Kuiper belt, circumstellar discs, planetary ring systems, the physical properties of comets, frozen volatiles in asteroids, the moons of the gas giant planets and the formation and evolution of the Solar System.

In 1992, after five years of searching, Jewitt and the Vietnamese-American astronomer Jane X. Luu discovered 15760 Albion, the first Kuiper belt object (other than Pluto and its largest moon Charon) to be detected. Jewitt and Luu named the object after a character who features in the mythological poetry of William Blake, a writer whom Jewitt admires. (Blake in turn took the name from an ancient poetic term for Jewitt's native England.) Jewitt and Luu would have preferred to name the object Smiley after the protagonist of John le Carré's novel Tinker, Tailor, Soldier, Spy, a favourite book of both of theirs, but they were unable to do so because the name had already been allocated to the asteroid 1613 Smiley in honour of Charles Hugh Smiley, an American astronomer.

Since discovering 15760 Albion, Jewitt has identified dozens of other objects in the Kuiper belt in a series of pioneering wide field surveys. Thanks to his work and the efforts of other astronomers, it is now known that the Kuiper belt objects are divided into four distinct populations. In what is called the dynamically cold classical Kuiper belt, of which 15760 Albion is the prototypical member, objects have orbits that are almost circular and only slightly tilted with respect to the orbits of the major planets. In the dynamically hot classical Kuiper belt, objects have orbits that are more elongated and that are tilted at steeper angles. In the scattered disc, also called the scattered Kuiper belt, discovered in 1997, bodies move in large orbits that are more elongated and more tilted still. The Resonant Kuiper belt objects move in orbits that are harmonically related to that of Neptune: the ratio of the orbital period of a resonant object to the Neptunian year is equal to one small integer divided by another. (The resonant objects in the 3:2 mean-motion resonance Jewitt has named plutinos, in recognition of Pluto's being the first of them to be discovered.) Mathematical models of the formation and evolution of the Solar System have indicated that in order for the Kuiper belt to have developed the structure that has been observed, the Kuiper belt objects and the gas giant planets must have come to their present orbits after migrating to them from elsewhere, pulled away from their earlier paths by their gravitational interactions with one another and with the disc of material that had coalesced around the juvenile Sun. In particular, it seems that Neptune long ago moved outward from an earlier orbit that was much closer to the Sun, and that the Kuiper belt objects, also originally closer to the Sun, were drawn outward with it.

In 1979, in his first months as a graduate student, Jewitt discovered the Jovian moon Adrastea on images taken by Voyager 2. He has since discovered more than seventy further moons of Jupiter, Saturn, Uranus and Neptune. In 1982, he achieved worldwide fame as the first astronomer to recover Halley's Comet as it approached its 1986 perihelion, detecting it with the Hale telescope using an early CCD. He is credited by the Minor Planet Center with the discovery of more than forty asteroids. The inner main-belt asteroid 6434 Jewitt, discovered by Edward Bowell in 1981, was named in his honour. In the naming citation, published on 1 July 1996, Jane Luu described Jewitt as "the consummate astronomer" (M.P.C. 27462).

== Controversies ==
When Pluto was first discovered, it was added to the canonical list of major planets. After Jewitt and Luu's discovery of 15760 Albion and the subsequent finding of many more Kuiper belt objects, it became apparent that Pluto had more in common with these objects than it did with its supposed planetary peers. Some astronomers suggested that Pluto should be demoted. Jewitt thought that the question of whether Pluto was a planet was "essentially bogus" and "scientifically [...] a non-issue", but ultimately agreed with the International Astronomical Union's 2006 decision to reclassify Pluto as a dwarf planet.

With the development of ever better telescopes and detectors, astronomers have been able to find moons that are ever smaller and smaller. Some astronomers have argued that moons smaller than some arbitrary size are unworthy of their title. Jewitt has dissented, asking "Is a small dog not a dog because it is small?"

== Outreach ==
In October 1982, Patrick Moore interviewed Jewitt about his recovery of Halley's Comet in a special episode of BBC TV's The Sky at Night. In November 1985, as the comet neared the Sun, Jewitt again described how he had recovered it in an episode of BBC TV's Horizon titled Halley's Comet – the Apparition (Season 22, Episode 17). A quarter of a century later, Horizon returned to Jewitt to interview him for Asteroids: the Good, the Bad and the Ugly (Season 47, Episode 6). Jewitt told viewers that he had found it difficult to secure enough telescope time for his trans-Neptunian research, and had only been able to achieve his celebrated breakthrough by looking for Kuiper belt objects on nights when he was supposed to be working on other projects.

Jewitt has also explained his work to non-specialists in articles in Scientific American, Sky and Telescope and The Sky at Night BBC Magazine.

== Honours ==
In 1994, Jewitt was awarded the University of Hawaiʻi's Regent's Medal for excellence in research. In 1996, the ARCS (Achievement Rewards for College Scientists) Foundation's Honolulu chapter named him the Hawaii Scientist of the Year, and NASA gave him their Exceptional Scientific Achievement Medal. In 1998, he was made an Honorary Fellow of University College London. In 2000, he became an Honorary Professor at the National Astronomical Observatory of the Chinese Academy of Sciences. In 2005, he became a Member of the National Academy of Sciences, a Fellow of the American Association for the Advancement of Science and a Fellow of the American Academy of Arts and Sciences. In 2007, he was made an adjunct professor of the National Central University of Taiwan. In 2012, he was awarded the $1 million Shaw Prize for astronomy, jointly with his former student Jane X. Luu of MIT's Lincoln Laboratury, in recognition of their "discovery and characterization of trans-Neptunian bodies, an archaeological treasure dating back to the formation of the solar system and the long sought source of short period comets". In 2012 too he was awarded the $1 million Kavli Prize for astrophysics, jointly with Luu and Michael Brown, for the same work. 2012 also saw his becoming a Foreign Member of the Norwegian Academy of Science and Letters. In 2026, he was awarded, together with Jane Luu, the Prix Jules Janssen by the Société astronomique de France.

== Personal life ==
In 1991, Jewitt met Jing Li (a Chinese-American born in Beijing, China), a Ph.D. student of solar physics at the University of Paris, while she was visiting the University of Hawaiʻi. Jewitt and Jing married in 1993. Their daughter, Suu Suu, was born in 2000.

As a child, Jewitt's extra-astronomical interests included writing, history, music, machines, animals, trees, rocks and fossils. Among the pleasures of his mature years are the cult British TV series The Prisoner and the music of the twentieth century modernist composers Karlheinz Stockhausen and Iannis Xenakis. Jewitt remembers a visit of Xenakis's to Caltech as a highlight of his years of working there.

In 2014, Jewitt was one of 365 eminent people invited to forecast the likely future of the Earth. He declared himself hopeful, deriving his optimism from his opinion that democracy had transcended dictatorship and science had transcended religion.

== Select bibliography ==
Minor planets discovered: 48
10370 Hylonome^{[1]}	27 February 1995
15760 Albion^{[1]}	20 August 1992
(15807) 1994 GV9^{[2]}	15 April 1994
(15809) 1994 JS^{[1]}	11 May 1994
(15820) 1994 TB^{[2]}	2 October 1994
(15836) 1995 DA2^{[1]}	24 February 1995
(15874) 1996 TL66^{[1]}^{[2]}^{[3]}	9 October 1996
(15875) 1996 TP66^{[1]}^{[3]}	11 October 1996
(15883) 1997 CR29^{[2]}^{[3]}	3 February 1997
(19308) 1996 TO66^{[1]}^{[3]}	12 October 1996
(20108) 1995 QZ9^{[2]}	29 August 1995
(20161) 1996 TR66^{[1]}^{[2]}^{[3]}	8 October 1996
(24952) 1997 QJ4^{[1]}^{[3]}^{[4]}	28 August 1997
(24978) 1998 HJ151^{[1]}^{[3]}^{[5]}	28 April 1998
(32929) 1995 QY_{9}^{[2]}	31 August 1995
(33001) 1997 CU29^{[1]}^{[2]}^{[3]}	6 February 1997
(59358) 1999 CL158^{[1]}^{[3]}	11 February 1999
66652 Borasisi^{[1]}^{[3]}	8 September 1999
79360 Sila–Nunam^{[1]}^{[2]}^{[3]}	3 February 1997
(79969) 1999 CP133^{[1]}^{[3]}	11 February 1999
(79978) 1999 CC158^{[1]}^{[3]}^{[6]}	15 February 1999
(79983) 1999 DF9^{[1]}^{[3]}	20 February 1999
(91554) 1999 RZ_{215}^{[1]}^{[3]}	8 September 1999
(118228) 1996 TQ66^{[1]}^{[2]}^{[3]}	8 October 1996
(129746) 1999 CE_{119}^{[1]}^{[3]}	10 February 1999
(131695) 2001 XS_{254}^{[6]}^{[7]}	9 December 2001
(131696) 2001 XT254^{[6]}^{[7]}	9 December 2001
(131697) 2001 XH255^{[6]}^{[7]}	11 December 2001
(134568) 1999 RH_{215}^{[1]}^{[3]}	7 September 1999
(137294) 1999 RE_{215}^{[1]}^{[3]}	7 September 1999
(137295) 1999 RB216^{[1]}^{[3]}	8 September 1999
(148112) 1999 RA_{216}^{[1]}^{[3]}	8 September 1999
(148975) 2001 XA255^{[6]}^{[7]}	9 December 2001
(168700) 2000 GE_{147}^{[3]}^{[6]}	2 April 2000
(181708) 1993 FW^{[1]}	28 March 1993
(181867) 1999 CV_{118}^{[1]}^{[3]}	10 February 1999
(181868) 1999 CG_{119}^{[1]}^{[3]}	11 February 1999
(181871) 1999 CO_{153}^{[1]}^{[3]}	12 February 1999
(181902) 1999 RD215^{[1]}^{[3]}	6 September 1999
(385185) 1993 RO^{[1]}	14 September 1993
(385201) 1999 RN_{215}^{[1]}^{[3]}	7 September 1999
(415720) 1999 RU_{215}^{[1]}^{[3]}	7 September 1999
(469306) 1999 CD158^{[1]}^{[3]}	10 February 1999
(469420) 2001 XP_{254}^{[6]}^{[7]}	10 December 2001
(469421) 2001 XD_{255}^{[6]}^{[7]}	9 December 2001
(503858) 1998 HQ_{151}^{[1]}^{[3]}^{[5]}	28 April 1998
(508792) 2000 FX_{53}^{[3]}^{[6]}	31 March 2000
(508770) 1995 WY_{2}^{[1]}	18 November 1995
1. ^{1} with J. X. Luu; 2. ^{2} with J. Chen; 3. ^{3} with C. A. Trujillo; 4. ^{4} with K. Berney; 5. ^{5} with D. J. Tholen; 6. ^{6} with S. S. Sheppard; 7. ^{7} with J. T. Kleyna; 8. ^{8} credited to Mauna Kea Observatories
Uncredited (currently):
58534 Logos^{[8]}	4 February 1997

A complete, up to date list of Jewitt's more than two hundred academic publications is available via his UCLA website. His magazine articles for general readers are:

- J. Luu and D. Jewitt: The Kuiper belt; Scientific American, May 1996
- D. Jewitt, S. Sheppard and J. Kleyna: The strangest satellites in the Solar System; Scientific American, August 2006
- D. Jewitt: What else is out there?; Sky and Telescope, March 2010
- D. Jewitt: Mysterious travelers; Sky and Telescope. December 2013
- D. Jewitt and E. Young: Oceans from the skies; Scientific American, March 2015
- D. Jewitt: The Kuiper belt; The Sky at Night BBC Magazine, November 2015
