= Chen Jun =

Chen Jun or Jun Chen may refer to:

- Chen Jun (chemist) (陈军), Chinese chemist and academician of the Chinese Academy of Sciences
- Chen Jun (geographer), Chinese geographer and academician of the Chinese Academy of Engineering
- Chen Jun (geologist) (陈骏), Chinese geologist and academician of the Chinese Academy of Sciences
- Jun Chen (astronomer), Chinese-American astronomer
