= Pabu (disambiguation) =

Pabu is a French commune.

Pabu may also refer to:

- Borasisi I Pabu, a trans-neptunian moon
- Pabu (The Legend of Korra), a character in the world of Avatar: The Last Airbender
- "Pabu" (Star Wars: The Bad Batch), a planet and episode name in the animated series Star Wars: The Bad Batch
