= 15760 Albion =

Trans-Neptunian object, prototype of cubewanos

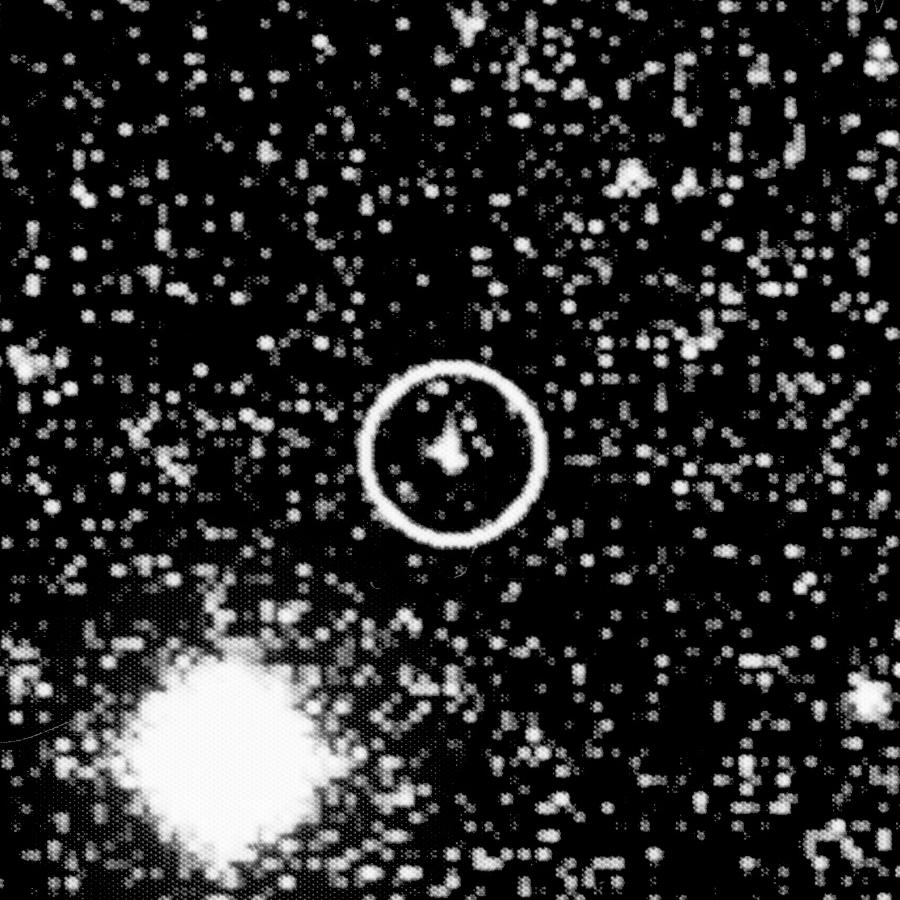
- Long-exposure image of Albion (circled) taken by the European Southern Observatory in September 1992

Discovery
- Discovered by: D. C. Jewitt; J. X. Luu
- Discovery site: Mauna Kea Obs.
- Discovery date: 30 August 1992

Designations
- Pronunciation: /ˈælbiən/
- Named after: Albion (mythology by William Blake)
- Alternative designations: 1992 QB_{1}
- Minor planet category: TNO · cubewano (cold) distant

Orbital characteristics
- Epoch 31 May 2020 (JD 2459000.5)
- Uncertainty parameter 3
- Observation arc: 26.34 yr (9,621 days)
- Aphelion: 47.042 AU
- Perihelion: 40.809 AU
- Semi-major axis: 43.925 AU
- Eccentricity: 0.07096
- Orbital period (sidereal): 291.13 yr (106,334 days)
- Mean anomaly: 34.041°
- Mean motion: 0° 0^{m} 12.188^{s} / day
- Inclination: 2.1797°
- Longitude of ascending node: 359.276°
- Argument of perihelion: 0.7765°

Physical characteristics
- Mean diameter: 125? km 108 km
- Geometric albedo: 0.2 (assumed) 0.152?
- Spectral type: RR (red); B–V=0.869±0.143; V−R=0.707±0.093; V−I=1.212±0.146
- Apparent magnitude: 23.3
- Absolute magnitude (H): 7.38±0.06 · 7.1

15760 Albion (provisional designation 1992 QB_{1}) is the first trans-Neptunian object discovered after Pluto and Charon. Measuring about 108–167 kilometres in diameter, it was discovered in 1992 by David C. Jewitt and Jane X. Luu at the Mauna Kea Observatory, Hawaii. After the discovery, they dubbed the object "Smiley" and it was shortly hailed as the tenth planet by the press. It is a "cold" classical Kuiper belt object and gave rise to the name cubewano for this kind of object, after the QB1 portion of its designation. Decoding its provisional designation, "QB_{1}" reveals that it was the 27th object found in the second half of August of that year. As of January 2018, around 2,400 further objects have been found beyond Neptune, a majority of which are classical Kuiper belt objects. It was named after Albion from William Blake's mythology.

== Naming ==
Orbit of the four outer planets (red) compared to (15760) Albion (blue)

This minor planet was named after Albion from the complex mythology of English poet and painter William Blake (1757–1827). Albion is the island-dwelling primeval man whose division resulted into The Four Zoas: Urizen, Tharmas, Luvah/Orc and Urthona/Los. The name Albion itself derives from the ancient and mythological name of Britain. The official naming citation was published by the Minor Planet Center on 31 January 2018 (M.P.C. 108697).

The discoverers suggested the name "Smiley" for (15760) 1992 QB_{1}, but the name was already used for an asteroid 1613 Smiley, named after the American astronomer Charles Hugh Smiley. It has received the number 15760 and remained unnamed until January 2018 (it was normally referred to simply as "QB1", even though this was technically ambiguous without the year of discovery).

== Legacy ==
The next year in 1993, objects in similar orbits were found including (15788) 1993 SB, (15789) 1993 SC, (181708) 1993 FW, and (385185) 1993 RO.

Over one thousand bodies were found in the Kuiper belt orbiting between about 30 and 50 AU from the Sun in the twenty years after finding 15760 Albion. This revealed a vast belt of bodies, more than just Pluto and Albion themselves. By 2018, over 2000 Kuiper belt objects were discovered.

== Physical characteristics ==
Based on a generic magnitude-to-diameter conversion, Albion measures approximately 167 kilometres (104 mi) in diameter, for an assumed albedo of 0.9 and a magnitude of 7.0. According to Mike Brown, who estimates a mean diameter of 108 kilometres (67 mi), the object is too small for being considered a dwarf planet candidate ("probably not"). As of 2021, no rotational lightcurve for this body has been obtained from photometric observations. Its rotation period and pole, as well as its composition and shape remain unknown.

== See also ==
- List of trans-Neptunian objects

== Notes ==
Minor planet and asteroid provisional designations follow a format, in which the year it was discovered comes first, followed by the half-month it was discovered alphabetically (e.g. A=January 1–15, B=January 16–31 and so on, but skipping the letters I and Z) and then the order of its discovery alphabetically followed by a number (e.g. 1992 QA, 1992 QB, 1992 QC ... 1992 QY, 1992 QZ, 1992 QA1, 1992 QB1 and so on.) According to this, Q=August 16–31 and B1=25+2=27.
