= Jane Luu =

Vietnamese American astronomer

Jane Lưu
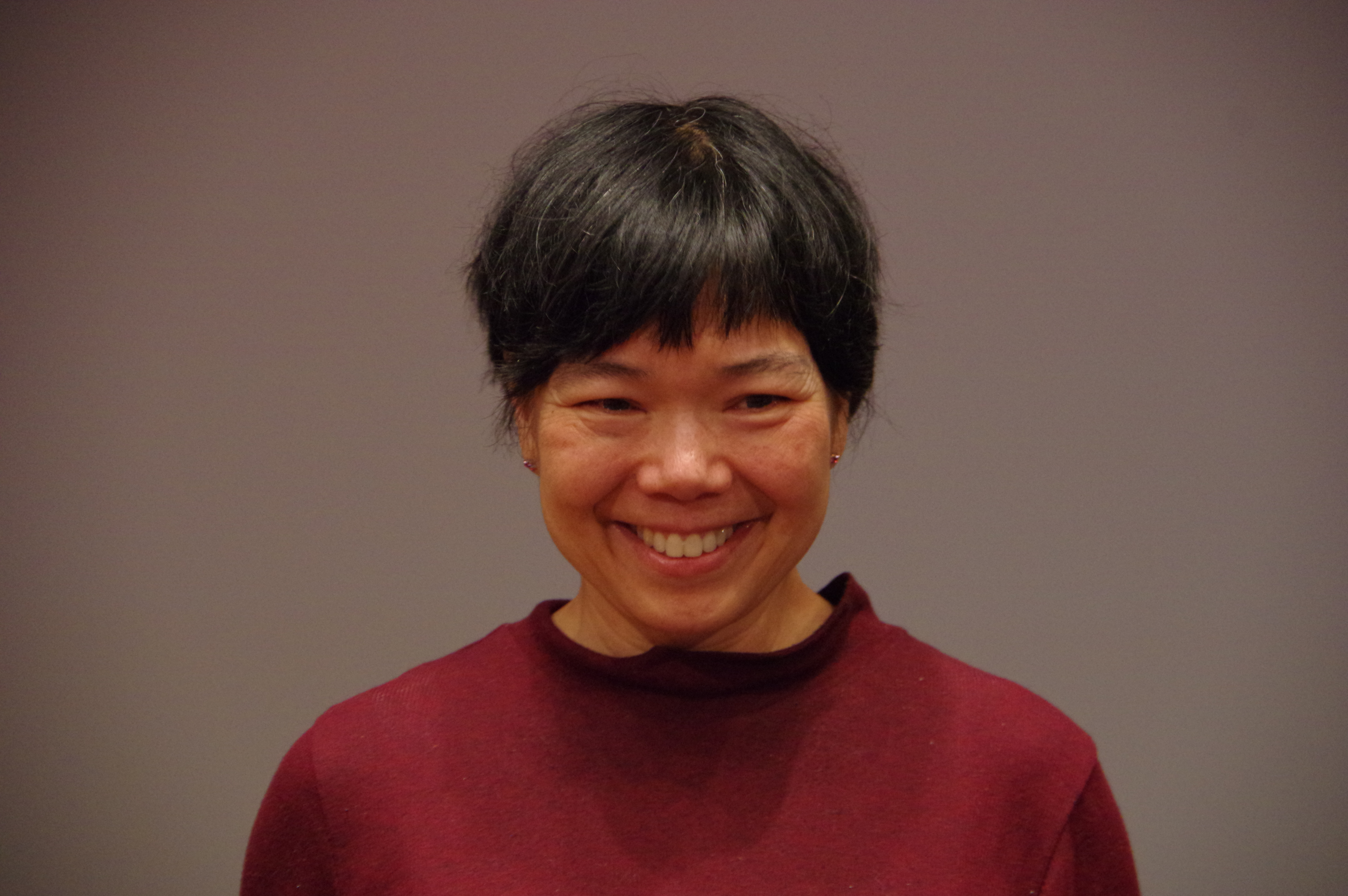
- Born: July 1963 (age 63); Saigon, Vietnam
- Education: Stanford University, University of California, Berkeley, Massachusetts Institute of Technology
- Known for: Discovery of the Kuiper belt
- Spouse: Ronnie Hoogerwerf
- Awards: Annie J. Cannon Award in Astronomy (1991); Shaw Prize (2012); Kavli Prize (2012); Prix Jules Janssen (2026)
- Scientific career
- Fields: Astronomy, Astrophysics, Engineering
- Workplaces: Harvard University, Lincoln Laboratory at MIT, Tufts University, University of Oslo
- Thesis: Physical Studies of Primitive Solar System Bodies (1992)
- Doctoral advisor: David C. Jewitt

Minor planets discovered: 37
10370 Hylonome^{[A]}	February 27, 1995
15760 Albion^{[A]}	August 20, 1992
(15809) 1994 JS^{[A]}	May 11, 1994
(15836) 1995 DA2^{[A]}	February 24, 1995
(15874) 1996 TL66^{[A]}^{[B]}^{[C]}	October 9, 1996
(15875) 1996 TP66^{[A]}^{[C]}	October 11, 1996
(19308) 1996 TO66^{[A]}^{[C]}	October 12, 1996
(20161) 1996 TR66^{[A]}^{[B]}^{[C]}	October 8, 1996
(24952) 1997 QJ4^{[A]}^{[C]}^{[D]}	August 28, 1997
(24978) 1998 HJ151^{[A]}^{[C]}^{[E]}	April 28, 1998
(26375) 1999 DE9^{[C]}	February 20, 1999
(33001) 1997 CU29^{[A]}^{[B]}^{[C]}	February 6, 1997
(59358) 1999 CL158^{[A]}^{[C]}	February 11, 1999
(60608) 2000 EE173^{[C]}^{[F]}	March 3, 2000
66652 Borasisi^{[A]}^{[C]}	September 8, 1999
79360 Sila–Nunam^{[A]}^{[B]}^{[C]}	February 3, 1997
(79969) 1999 CP133^{[A]}^{[C]}	February 11, 1999
(79978) 1999 CC158^{[A]}^{[C]}^{[G]}	February 15, 1999
(79983) 1999 DF9^{[A]}^{[C]}	February 20, 1999
(91554) 1999 RZ_{215}^{[A]}^{[C]}	September 8, 1999
(118228) 1996 TQ66^{[A]}^{[B]}^{[C]}	October 8, 1996
(129746) 1999 CE_{119}^{[A]}^{[C]}	February 10, 1999
(134568) 1999 RH_{215}^{[A]}^{[C]}	September 7, 1999
(137294) 1999 RE_{215}^{[A]}^{[C]}	September 7, 1999
(137295) 1999 RB216^{[A]}^{[C]}	September 8, 1999
(148112) 1999 RA_{216}^{[A]}^{[C]}	September 8, 1999
(181708) 1993 FW^{[A]}	March 28, 1993
(181867) 1999 CV_{118}^{[A]}^{[C]}	February 10, 1999
(181868) 1999 CG_{119}^{[A]}^{[C]}	February 11, 1999
(181871) 1999 CO_{153}^{[A]}^{[C]}	February 12, 1999
(181902) 1999 RD215^{[A]}^{[C]}	September 6, 1999
(385185) 1993 RO^{[A]}	September 14, 1993
(385201) 1999 RN_{215}^{[A]}^{[C]}	September 7, 1999
(415720) 1999 RU_{215}^{[A]}^{[C]}	September 7, 1999
(469306) 1999 CD158^{[A]}^{[C]}	February 10, 1999
(503858) 1998 HQ_{151}^{[A]}^{[C]}^{[E]}	April 28, 1998
(508770) 1995 WY_{2}^{[A]}	18 November 1995
Legend to co-discoverers: ^{A} David C. Jewitt; ^{B} Jun Chen; ^{C} Chadwick Trujillo; ^{D} K. Berney; ^{E} David J. Tholen; ^{F} N. Wyn Evans; ^{G} Scott S. Sheppard

Jane X. Luu (Vietnamese: Lưu Lệ Hằng; born July 1963) is a Vietnamese-American astronomer and defense systems engineer. She was awarded the Kavli Prize (shared with David C. Jewitt and Michael Brown) for 2012 "for discovering and characterizing the Kuiper Belt and its largest members, work that led to a major advance in the understanding of the history of our planetary system".

== Early life ==
Luu immigrated to the United States as a refugee in 1975, during the fall of Saigon. She and her family lived in refugee camps and motels before they settled in Kentucky, where she had relatives. She graduated from high school as valedictorian and then earned a scholarship to Stanford University, receiving her bachelor's degree in physics in 1984. Working at the Jet Propulsion Laboratory at NASA after college inspired her to study astronomy.

== Work as a graduate student and co-discovery of the Kuiper Belt ==
As a graduate student at the University of California, Berkeley and the Massachusetts Institute of Technology, she looked at links between asteroids and comets for her main PhD project. She also worked with David C. Jewitt to discover the Kuiper Belt, an area previously believed to contain no objects. In 1992, after five years of observation, they found the first known Kuiper Belt object other than Pluto and its largest moon Charon, using the University of Hawaiʻi's 2.2-meter telescope on Mauna Kea. This object is 15760 Albion, which she and Jewitt nicknamed "Smiley". The American Astronomical Society awarded Luu the Annie J. Cannon Award in Astronomy in 1991. In 1992, Luu received a Hubble Fellowship from the Space Telescope Science Institute and chose the University of California, Berkeley as a host institution. The Phocaea main-belt asteroid 5430 Luu is named in her honor. She received her PhD in 1992 at the Massachusetts Institute of Technology.

== Professional life ==
After receiving her doctorate, Luu worked as an assistant professor at Harvard University since 1994. Luu also served as a professor at Leiden University in the Netherlands. Following her time in Europe, Luu returned to the United States and worked on instrumentation as a Senior Scientist at MIT Lincoln Laboratory, focusing on defense-industry projects, specifically lidar systems. Since 2001, Luu has been a member of the technical staff at MIT Lincoln Laboratory, where her work has included the development of lidar-based sensing systems and related defense research.

In December 2004, Luu and Jewitt reported the discovery of crystalline water ice on Quaoar, which was at the time the largest known Kuiper Belt object. They also found indications of ammonia hydrate. Their report theorized that the ice likely formed underground, becoming exposed after a collision with another Kuiper Belt object sometime in the last few million years.

In 2012, she won (along with David C. Jewitt of the University of California, Los Angeles) the Shaw Prize "for their discovery and characterization of trans-Neptunian bodies, an archeological treasure dating back to the formation of the solar system and the long-sought source of short period comets" and the Kavli Prize (shared with Jewitt and Michael E. Brown) "for discovering and characterizing the Kuiper Belt and its largest members, work that led to a major advance in the understanding of the history of our planetary system".

== Personal life ==
Luu enjoys traveling, and has worked for Save the Children in Nepal. She enjoys a variety of outdoor activities and plays the cello. She met her husband, Ronnie Hoogerwerf, who is also an astronomer, while working in the Netherlands in a tenured position at Leiden University. They have one child together.

== Honors, awards and accolades ==
- 1991 Annie J. Cannon Award in Astronomy
- 2012 Shaw Prize in Astronomy
- 2012 Kavli Prize in Astrophysics
- The asteroid 5430 Luu was named in her honor on 1 July 1996 (M.P.C. 27459).
- She is a fellow of the Norwegian Academy of Science and Letters.
- 2026 Prix Jules Janssen by the Société astronomique de France (shared with David Jewitt)

== Selected publications ==
- NASA Astrophysics Data System publication listing, Over 200 publications are listing
- Jewitt, D.; Luu, J. (1993). "Discovery of the candidate Kuiper belt object 1992 QB1". Nature. 362: 730–732. doi:10.1038/362730a0.
- Luu, J.; Jewitt, D. (1996). "Color Diversity Among the Centaurs and Kuiper Belt Objects". The Astronomical Journal. 112: 2310–2318.
- Jewitt, D.; Luu, J. (2004). "Crystalline water ice on the Kuiper belt object (50000) Quaoar". Nature. 432: 731–733. doi:10.1038/nature03111.
- Luu, Jane; D.C. Jewitt & C. Trujillo (2000). "Water ice in 2060 Chiron and its implications for Centaurs and Kuiper Belt objects". Astrophysical Journal. 531 (2): L151–L154. arXiv:astro-ph/0002094. Bibcode:2000ApJ...531L.151L. doi:10.1086/312536. PMID 10688775. S2CID 9946112.
- Luu, Jane; D.C. Jewitt (1998). "Deep Imaging of the Kuiper Belt with the Keck 10-Meter Telescope". Astrophysical Journal. 502 (1): L91–L94. Bibcode:1998ApJ...502L..91L. doi:10.1086/311490.
- Luu, Jane; B. Marsden; D.C. Jewitt; C. Trujillo; C. Hegenrother; J. Chen & W. Offutt (1997). "A New Dynamical Class of Object in the Outer Solar System". Nature. 387 (6633): 573. Bibcode:1997Natur.387..573L. doi:10.1038/42413. S2CID 4370529.
- Luu, Jane; D.C. Jewitt (1996). "Color Diversity among the Centaurs and Kuiper Belt Objects". Astronomical Journal. 112: 2310–2318. Bibcode:1996AJ....112.2310L. doi:10.1086/118184.
- Luu, Jane; D.C. Jewitt (1992). "High Resolution Surface Brightness Profiles of Near-Earth Asteroids". Icarus. 97 (2): 276–287. Bibcode:1992Icar...97..276L. doi:10.1016/0019-1035(92)90134-S.
- Luu, Jane (1991). "CCD Photometry and Spectroscopy of Outer Jovian Satellites". Astronomical Journal. 102: 1213–1225. Bibcode:1991AJ....102.1213L. doi:10.1086/115949.
- Crystalline Ice on Kuiper Belt Object (50000) Quaoar (article co-written with David Jewitt, published in the December 9, 2004 issue of Nature)
- The Shape Distribution of Kuiper Belt Objects (paper co-written with Pedro Lacerda, June 2003)
- Comet Impact on McMaster (presentation summary, November 2001)
- Accretion in the Early Kuiper Belt I. Coagulation and Velocity Evolution (paper co-written with Scott J. Kenyon, published in May 1998 Astronomical Journal)
- Optical and Infrared Reflectance Spectrum of Kuiper Belt Object 1996 TL66 (paper co-written with D.C. Jewitt, January 1998)
