= (118228) 1996 TQ66 =

Trans-Neptunian object

(118228) 1996 TQ_{66}
Discovery
- Discovered by: J. Chen; D. C. Jewitt; C. Trujillo; J. X. Luu
- Discovery site: Mauna Kea Obs.
- Discovery date: 8 October 1996

Designations
- Minor planet category: TNO · plutino

Orbital characteristics
- Epoch 1 July 2021 (JD 2459396.5)
- Uncertainty parameter 2
- Observation arc: 24.17 yr (8,828 d)
- Aphelion: 44.219 AU
- Perihelion: 34.535 AU
- Semi-major axis: 39.377 AU
- Eccentricity: 0.1230
- Orbital period (sidereal): 247.10 yr (90,254 d)
- Mean anomaly: 33.659°
- Mean motion: 0° 0^{m} 14.4^{s} / day
- Inclination: 14.650°
- Longitude of ascending node: 10.613°
- Argument of perihelion: 18.541°

Physical characteristics
- Mean diameter: 185 km (est. at 0.09)
- Spectral type: RR (very red); B–V = 1.190±0.020; V–R = 0.660±0.030; V–I = 1.440±0.140
- Apparent magnitude: 22.85
- Absolute magnitude (H): 7.14

(118228) 1996 TQ_{66} is a resonant trans-Neptunian object of the plutino population in the Kuiper belt, located in the outermost region of the Solar System. It was discovered on 8 October 1996, by American astronomers Jun Chen, David Jewitt, Chad Trujillo, and Jane Luu, using the UH88 telescope at the Mauna Kea Observatories, Hawaii. The very red object measures approximately 185 kilometers (110 miles) in diameter.

== Orbit and classification ==
1996 TQ_{66} orbits the Sun at a distance of 34.5–44.2 AU once every 247 years and 1 month (90,254 days; semi-major axis of 39.38 AU). Its orbit has an eccentricity of 0.12 and an inclination of 15° with respect to the ecliptic. The body's observation arc begins with its official discovery observation at the Mauna Kea Observatories on 8 October 1996. It came to perihelion in 1998. As of 2021, it is at 35.6 AU from the Sun and has an apparent magnitude of 22.85.

1996 TQ_{66} is a trans-Neptunian object and belongs to the plutino population, a large group of objects named after their largest member, Pluto. These resonant trans-Neptunian objects stay in a 2:3 mean-motion orbital resonance with Neptune, orbiting exactly two times the Sun for every three orbits Neptune does and are therefore protected from Neptune's scattering effect. Plutinos are located in the inner rim of the Kuiper belt, a large circumstellar disc of mostly non-resonant classical Kuiper belt objects.

== Numbering and naming ==
1996 TQ_{66} was numbered by the Minor Planet Center on 16 November 2005, receiving the number 118228 in the minor planet catalog (M.P.C. 55524). As of 2025, it has not been named. According to the established naming conventions, it will be given a mythological name associated with the underworld.

== Physical characteristics ==
=== Color ===
1996 TQ_{66} has a very red surface color (RR) in the visible part of the spectrum, with B−V and V–R color indices of 1.190±0.020 and 0.660±0.030, respectively, for a combined B−R magnitude of 1.85. A red surface color is typically associated with the presence of tholins, polymer-like organic compounds, formed by long exposures to solar and cosmic radiation.

=== Rotation period ===
In 1999, results of a photometric survey of Kuiper belt objects by Romanishin and Tegler were published in the journal Nature. For 1996 TQ_{66}, a brightness variation of no more than 0.22 in magnitude could be determined, which is indicative of a modestly irregular shape. As of 2021, no rotational lightcurve for this object has been obtained from photometry. The body's rotation period, pole and actual shape remain unknown.

=== Diameter and albedo ===
Based on a generic magnitude-to-diameter conversion, 1996 TQ_{66} measures approximately 185 kilometers (110 miles) in diameter, for an assumed albedo of 0.9 and a magnitude of 7. According to Mike Brown, who estimates a mean-diameter of 186 km (120 mi), the object is too small for being considered a dwarf planet candidate ("probably not").
