= (15789) 1993 SC =

Trans-Neptunian object

- Its orbit around the Sun.

Discovery
- Discovered by: Iwan P. Williams, Alan Fitzsimmons, and Donal O'Ceallaigh
- Discovery date: 17 September 1993

Designations
- Minor planet category: Plutino

Orbital characteristics
- Epoch 13 January 2016 (JD 2457400.5)
- Uncertainty parameter 3
- Observation arc: 5839 days (15.99 yr)
- Aphelion: 46.639 AU (6.9771 Tm)
- Perihelion: 32.162 AU (4.8114 Tm)
- Semi-major axis: 39.400 AU (5.8942 Tm)
- Eccentricity: 0.18372
- Orbital period (sidereal): 247.32 yr (90333.4 d)
- Mean anomaly: 66.186°
- Mean motion: 0° 0^{m} 14.347^{s} / day
- Inclination: 5.1667°
- Longitude of ascending node: 354.75°
- Argument of perihelion: 316.20°
- Known satellites: 0
- Earth MOID: 31.1475 AU (4.65960 Tm)
- Jupiter MOID: 27.0752 AU (4.05039 Tm)
- T_{Jupiter}: 5.520

Physical characteristics
- Mean diameter: 328±60 km 363 km
- Geometric albedo: 0.022±0.010
- Absolute magnitude (H): 7.0

(15789) 1993 SC is a trans-Neptunian object of the plutino class. The discovery was made in 1993 at the La Palma Observatory with the Isaac Newton Telescope. The object measures approximately 328 km in diameter. It was the second plutino to receive an MPC number.

Other Kuiper belt objects discovered in 1993 include: (15788) 1993 SB, (181708) 1993 FW, (385185) 1993 RO and 1993 RP.

== Orbit and classification ==
1993 SC orbits the Sun at a distance of 32.2–46.1 AU one per 247 Earth years (90,254 days, semi-major axis of 39.4 AU). Its orbit has an eccentricity of 0.183 and an inclination of 5.166° respective to the elliptic. Its observation arc begins with Mauna Kea Observatory in 1993.

1993 SC is a trans-Neptunian object and belongs to the plutinos, an orbital class of objects named after their largest member, Pluto. These resonant trans-Neptunian objects stay in a 2:3 mean-motion orbital resonance with Neptune, orbiting exactly two times around the sun for every three orbits Neptune does.

== Numbering and naming ==
1993 SC was numbered by the Minor Planet Center on 26 July 2000, receiving the number 15789 in the minor planet catalog. As of 2025, it has not been named. According to the established naming conventions, it will get a mythological name associated with the underworld.

== Physical characteristics ==
1993 SC has a diameter of 328 km (204 mi) and a low geometric albedo of 0.022. It also has a very red surface color (RR) in its visible spectrum, with B-V and V-R color indices of 1.27 and 0.70 respectively. A red surface color is typically represented with the association of tholins, polymer-like organic compounds, formed by long exposures to solar and cosmic radiation.

== See also ==
- 15760 Albion
- List of trans-Neptunian objects
- Kuiper belt
