= (148975) 2001 XA255 =

Centaur

(148975) 2001 XA_{255}
Discovery
- Discovered by: David C. Jewitt, Scott S. Sheppard and Jan Kleyna
- Discovery date: 9 December 2001

Designations
- Minor planet category: Centaur

Orbital characteristics
- Epoch 13 January 2016 (JD 2457400.5)
- Uncertainty parameter 2
- Observation arc: 3812 days (10.44 yr)
- Aphelion: 48.731 AU (7.2901 Tm)
- Perihelion: 9.3364 AU (1.39671 Tm)
- Semi-major axis: 29.034 AU (4.3434 Tm)
- Eccentricity: 0.67843
- Orbital period (sidereal): 156.44 yr (57141.1 d)
- Mean anomaly: 12.809°
- Mean motion: 0° 0^{m} 22.681^{s} / day
- Inclination: 12.628°
- Longitude of ascending node: 105.89°
- Argument of perihelion: 90.452°
- Jupiter MOID: 4.12722 AU (617.423 Gm)

Physical characteristics
- Mean diameter: 12.5 km 38 km
- Geometric albedo: 0.041
- Absolute magnitude (H): 11.1

(148975) 2001 XA_{255} is a dark minor planet in the outer Solar System, classified as centaur, approximately 38 kilometers (24 miles) in diameter. It was discovered on 9 December 2001, by David C. Jewitt, Scott S. Sheppard, and Jan Kleyna observing from the Mauna Kea Observatory. The object is currently trapped in a 1:1 mean-motion resonance with Neptune following a path of the horseshoe type.

== Orbit and classification ==
2001 XA_{255} follows a very eccentric orbit (0.68) with a perihelion just inside the orbit of Saturn, an aphelion in the trans-Neptunian belt and a semi-major axis of 28.9 AU. The orbital inclination of this object is moderate at 12.6º.

=== Resonance with Neptune ===
2001 XA_{255} was identified as trapped in a 1:1 mean-motion resonance with Neptune and 1:2 with Uranus by T. Gallardo in 2006. The object is dynamically unstable and it entered the region of the giant planets relatively recently, perhaps 50,000 years ago, from the scattered disk. It follows a short-lived horseshoe orbit around Neptune.

== Physical characteristics ==
The object has an estimated diameter of 12.5 km and it was classified as an inactive centaur by David Jewitt. Observations by the NEOWISE mission gave a larger diameter of 37.7 kilometers and an albedo of 0.041. It has an absolute magnitude of 11.1.

== See also ==
- List of centaurs (small Solar System bodies) § 148975
