= (181708) 1993 FW =

Trans-Neptunian object

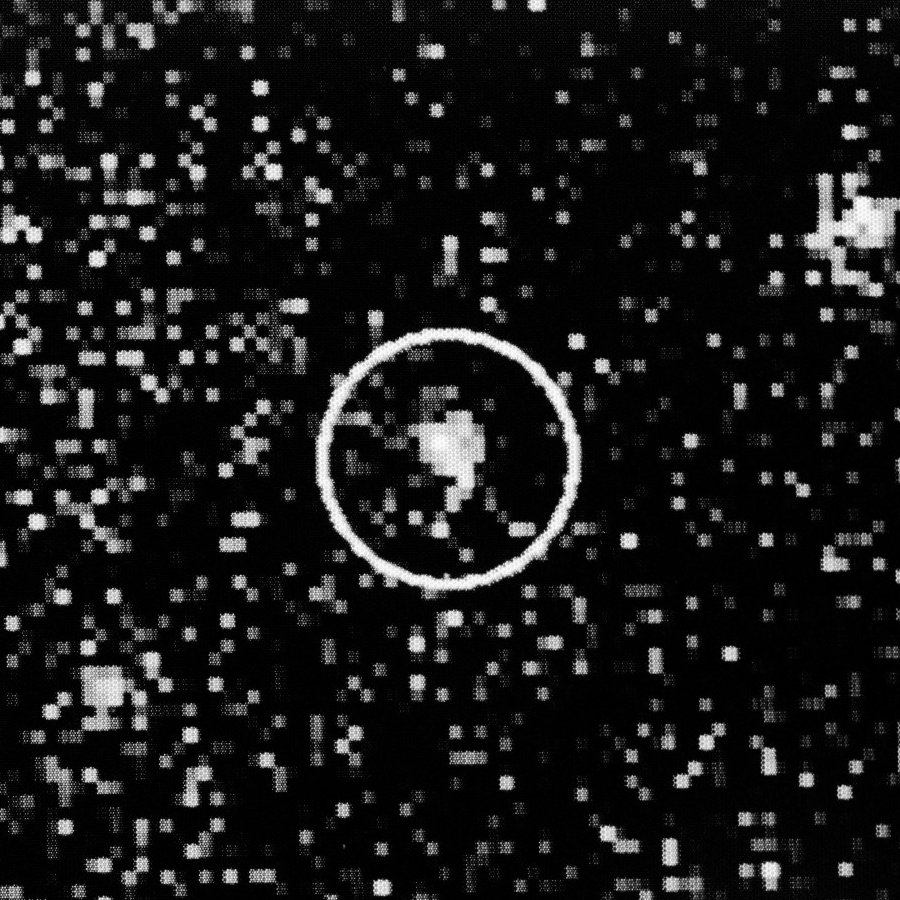
- 1993 FW as taken by astronomers David Jewitt and Jane Luu using the Danish 1.54-metre telescope at the European Southern Observatory (ESO) in La Silla, Chile.

Discovery
- Discovered by: David C. Jewitt, Jane X. Luu
- Discovery date: 28 March 1993

Designations
- Minor planet category: Trans-Neptunian object (cubewano)

Orbital characteristics
- Epoch 13 January 2016 (JD 2457400.5)
- Uncertainty parameter 3
- Observation arc: 5456 days (14.94 yr)
- Aphelion: 46.293 AU (6.9253 Tm)
- Perihelion: 41.642 AU (6.2296 Tm)
- Semi-major axis: 43.967 AU (6.5774 Tm)
- Eccentricity: 0.052899
- Orbital period (sidereal): 291.54 yr (106487 d)
- Average orbital speed: 4.489 km/s
- Mean anomaly: 351.305°
- Mean motion: 0° 0^{m} 12.171^{s} / day
- Inclination: 7.7336°
- Longitude of ascending node: 187.837°
- Argument of perihelion: 40.180°
- Jupiter MOID: 36.2333 AU (5.42042 Tm)

Physical characteristics
- Dimensions: 175 km 241 km
- Absolute magnitude (H): 7.0

(181708) 1993 FW is a cubewano and was the second trans-Neptunian object to be discovered after Pluto and Charon, the first having been 15760 Albion, provisionally known as 1992 QB_{1}. It was discovered in 1993 by David C. Jewitt and Jane X. Luu at the Mauna Kea Observatory, Hawaii. Following its discovery it was nicknamed "Karla" after a character by John le Carré by its discoverers and was hailed as that of a new planet. 1993 FW was also discovered half a year after Albion.

== See also ==
- 15760 Albion
- List of trans-Neptunian objects
- Kuiper belt
- (15788) 1993 SB, another Kuiper belt object discovered in 1993
- (15789) 1993 SC, another KBO discovered in 1993
- (385185) 1993 RO, another KBO discovered in 1993
