= (15788) 1993 SB =

Plutino

- Orbit of 1993 SB, planets (red) and the Sun (black). The outermost planet visible is Neptune.

Discovery
- Discovered by: Iwan P. Williams, Alan Fitzsimmons, and Donal O'Ceallaigh; La Palma (950)
- Discovery date: 16 September 1993

Designations
- Minor planet category: Plutino

Orbital characteristics
- Epoch 13 January 2016 (JD 2457400.5)
- Uncertainty parameter 4
- Observation arc: 5182 days (14.19 yr)
- Aphelion: 51.860 AU (7.7581 Tm)
- Perihelion: 26.727 AU (3.9983 Tm)
- Semi-major axis: 39.294 AU (5.8783 Tm)
- Eccentricity: 0.31981
- Orbital period (sidereal): 246.32 yr (89967.0 d)
- Average orbital speed: 4.64 km/s
- Mean anomaly: 349.75°
- Mean motion: 0° 0^{m} 14.405^{s} / day
- Inclination: 1.9398°
- Longitude of ascending node: 354.93°
- Argument of perihelion: 79.441°
- Earth MOID: 25.7421 AU (3.85096 Tm)
- Jupiter MOID: 21.655 AU (3.2395 Tm)
- T_{Jupiter}: 5.337

Physical characteristics
- Dimensions: 130 km
- Absolute magnitude (H): 7.9

(15788) 1993 SB is a trans-Neptunian object of the plutino class. Apart from Pluto, it was one of the first such objects discovered (beaten by two days by (385185) 1993 RO and by one day by 1993 RP), and the first to have an orbit calculated well enough to receive a number. The discovery was made in 1993 at the La Palma Observatory with the Isaac Newton Telescope. Very little is known about the object. Even the diameter estimate of ~130 km is based on an assumed albedo of 0.09.

Other Kuiper belt objects discovered in 1993 include (15789) 1993 SC, (181708) 1993 FW, and (385185) 1993 RO.

Over one thousand bodies were found in a belt orbiting between about 30–50 AU from the Sun in the twenty years (1992–2012), after finding 1992 QB_{1} (named in 2018, 15760 Albion), showing a vast belt of bodies more than just Pluto and Albion. By 2018, over 2000 Kuiper belt objects were discovered.
