= (79983) 1999 DF9 =

Trans-Neptunian object of the Kuiper belt

(79983) 1999 DF_{9}
Discovery
- Discovered by: J. X. Luu; C. Trujillo; D. C. Jewitt
- Discovery site: Kitt Peak National Obs.
- Discovery date: 20 February 1999

Designations
- Minor planet category: TNO · cubewano

Orbital characteristics
- Epoch 4 September 2017 (JD 2458000.5)
- Uncertainty parameter 2
- Observation arc: 17.06 yr (6,231 days)
- Aphelion: 53.567 AU
- Perihelion: 39.830 AU
- Semi-major axis: 46.698 AU
- Eccentricity: 0.1471
- Orbital period (sidereal): 319.12 yr (116,560 days)
- Mean anomaly: 19.489°
- Mean motion: 0° 0^{m} 11.16^{s} / day
- Inclination: 9.8105°
- Longitude of ascending node: 334.84°
- Argument of perihelion: 178.63°
- Known satellites: 0

Physical characteristics
- Dimensions: 265 km (calculated); 306 km
- Synodic rotation period: 6.65 h
- Geometric albedo: 0.10 (assumed)
- Spectral type: B–V = 0.920±0.060; V–R = 0.710±0.050; V–I = 1.360±0.060
- Absolute magnitude (H): 5.797±0.110 (R) · 6.0

(79983) 1999 DF_{9} is a trans-Neptunian object of the Kuiper belt, classified as a non-resonant cubewano, that measures approximately 270 kilometers in diameter.

== Discovery ==
It was discovered on 20 February 1999, by American and British astronomers Jane Luu, Chad Trujillo and David C. Jewitt at the U.S. Kitt Peak National Observatory in Arizona. As no precoveries were taken, the minor planet's observation arc begins with its discovery observation in 1999.

== Classification and orbit ==
The minor planet is a classical Kuiper belt object or "cubewano", which are not in an orbital resonance with Neptune and do not cross the giant planet's orbit. It orbits the Sun at a distance of 39.8–53.6 AU once every 319 years and 1 month (116,560 days). Its orbit has an eccentricity of 0.15 and an inclination of 10° with respect to the ecliptic. This makes it a relatively eccentric body for a classical Kuiper belt object, which typically have low-eccentricities of 0.10 or less.

== Physical characteristics ==
In February 2001, a rotational lightcurve was published for this minor planet from photometric observations by Portuguese astronomer Pedro Lacerda and the discovering astronomer Jane Luu. Lightcurve analysis gave a relatively short rotation period of 6.65 hours with a brightness variation of 0.40 magnitude (U=2).

The Collaborative Asteroid Lightcurve Link assumes a low albedo of 0.10 and calculates a mean-diameter of 265 kilometers, based on an absolute magnitude of 6.0, while Johnston's Archive give a diameter of 306 kilometers for an albedo of 0.09.

== Numbering and naming ==
This minor planet was numbered by the Minor Planet Center on 4 May 2004. As of 2025, it has not been named.
