= 5430 Luu =

Main-belt asteroid

Discovery
- Discovered by: C. Shoemaker; E. M. Shoemaker
- Discovery site: Palomar Obs.
- Discovery date: 12 May 1988

Designations
- Named after: Jane Luu (American astronomer)
- Alternative designations: 1988 JA_{1} · 1970 OL
- Minor planet category: main-belt · Phocaea

Orbital characteristics
- Epoch 4 September 2017 (JD 2458000.5)
- Uncertainty parameter 0
- Observation arc: 46.86 yr (17,114 days)
- Aphelion: 2.8929 AU
- Perihelion: 1.8356 AU
- Semi-major axis: 2.3642 AU
- Eccentricity: 0.2236
- Orbital period (sidereal): 3.64 yr (1,328 days)
- Mean anomaly: 20.073°
- Mean motion: 0° 16^{m} 15.96^{s} / day
- Inclination: 23.894°
- Longitude of ascending node: 123.00°
- Argument of perihelion: 122.11°

Physical characteristics
- Dimensions: 6.508±0.029 km 6.659±0.043; 7.63 km (calculated); 8.05±0.22 km 8.27±0.25 km
- Synodic rotation period: 4.44±0.05 h 13.55±0.02 h
- Geometric albedo: 0.212±0.012; 0.215±0.036; 0.23 (assumed); 0.3826±0.0839
- Spectral type: S
- Absolute magnitude (H): 12.6 · 12.70 · 12.8 · 13.45±0.87

5430 Luu, provisional designation 1988 JA_{1}, is a stony Phocaea asteroid from the inner regions of the asteroid belt, approximately 7 kilometers in diameter. It was discovered on 12 May 1988, by American astronomer couple Carolyn and Eugene Shoemaker at Palomar Observatory, California, and later named after astronomer Jane Luu.

== Orbit and classification ==
Luu is a member of the Phocaea family (701). It orbits the Sun in the inner main-belt at a distance of 1.8–2.9 AU once every 3 years and 8 months (1,328 days). Its orbit has an eccentricity of 0.22 and an inclination of 24° with respect to the ecliptic. The first precovery was taken at Crimea–Nauchnij in 1970, extending the asteroid's observation arc by 18 years prior to its discovery.

== Physical characteristics ==
Luu has been characterized as a common S-type asteroid.

=== Rotation period ===
In April 2006, photometric observations of Luu collected by American astronomer Brian D. Warner at his Palmer Divide Station, Colorado, show a rotation period of 13.55±0.02 hours with a brightness variation of 0.06±0.02 magnitude (U=2). A second, tentative lightcurve was obtained by French astronomer René Roy in July 2007. It gave a period of 4.44±0.05 hours and an amplitude of 0.05 in magnitude (U=2-).

=== Diameter and albedo ===
According to the surveys carried out by the Japanese Akari satellite and NASA's Wide-field Infrared Survey Explorer with its subsequent NEOWISE mission, Luu measures 6.5 and 8.3 kilometers in diameter and its surface has an albedo between 0.21 and 0.26.

The Collaborative Asteroid Lightcurve Link assumes an albedo of 0.23 – derived from 25 Phocaea, the family's most massive member and namesake – and calculates a diameter of 7.6 kilometers with an absolute magnitude of 12.8.

== Naming ==
This minor planet is named in honor of Vietnamese-American astronomer Jane X. Luu (born 1963) for her research and discovering the first and subsequent members of the Kuiper Belt. She also studied the physical properties of these bodies and the coma of potentially Extinct comets. The approved naming citation was published by the Minor Planet Center on 1 July 1996 (M.P.C. 27459).
