= (20161) 1996 TR66 =

Trans-Neptunian object

(20161) 1996 TR_{66}

Discovery
- Discovered by: D. C. Jewitt; C. Trujillo; J. X. Luu; J. Chen
- Discovery site: Mauna Kea Obs.
- Discovery date: 8 October 1996

Designations
- Minor planet category: TNO · twotino distant

Orbital characteristics
- Epoch 4 September 2017 (JD 2458000.5)
- Uncertainty parameter 4
- Observation arc: 12.04 yr (4,398 days)
- Aphelion: 66.612 AU
- Perihelion: 28.630 AU
- Semi-major axis: 47.621 AU
- Eccentricity: 0.3988
- Orbital period (sidereal): 328.63 yr (120,032 d)
- Mean anomaly: 55.593°
- Mean motion: 0° 0^{m} 10.8^{s} / day
- Inclination: 12.436°
- Longitude of ascending node: 343.11°
- Argument of perihelion: 308.70°

Physical characteristics
- Dimensions: 139 km
- Absolute magnitude (H): 7.5

(20161) 1996 TR_{66} is a trans-Neptunian object orbiting beyond Pluto in the Kuiper belt of the outermost Solar System, approximately 139 kilometers (86 miles) in diameter. It was discovered on 8 October 1996, by astronomers David Jewitt, Chad Trujillo, Jane Luu, and Jun Chen at the Mauna Kea Observatory, Hawaii, in the United States. It was the first discovery of a twotino.

== Orbit and classification ==
It orbits the Sun at a distance of 28.6–66.6 AU once every 328 years and 8 months (120,032 days). Its orbit has an eccentricity of 0.40 and an inclination of 12° with respect to the ecliptic. Near perihelion, it comes closer to the Sun than Neptune does (29.7 AU). It has a semi-major axis (average distance from the Sun) near the edge of the classical belt.

=== Twotino ===
1996 TR_{66} was the first twotino discovered. Twotinos stay in a 1:2 orbital resonance with Neptune, which means that for every one orbit a twotino makes, Neptune orbits two times. Both the Minor Planet Center and the Deep Ecliptic Survey list this trans-Neptunian object as a twotino.

== Numbering and naming ==
This minor planet was numbered by the Minor Planet Center on 9 January 2001. As of 2025, it has not been named.
