= Jun Chen (astronomer) =

Chinese-American astronomer

Minor planets discovered: 10
(15807) 1994 GV9	April 15, 1994	MPC ^{[A]}
(15820) 1994 TB	October 2, 1994	MPC ^{[A]}
(15874) 1996 TL66	October 9, 1996	MPC ^{[A]}^{[B]}^{[C]}
(15883) 1997 CR29	February 3, 1997	MPC ^{[A]}^{[B]}
(20108) 1995 QZ9	August 29, 1995	MPC ^{[A]}
(20161) 1996 TR66	October 8, 1996	MPC ^{[A]}^{[B]}^{[C]}
(32929) 1995 QY_{9}	August 31, 1995	MPC ^{[A]}
(33001) 1997 CU29	February 6, 1997	MPC ^{[A]}^{[B]}^{[C]}
79360 Sila–Nunam	February 3, 1997	MPC ^{[A]}^{[B]}^{[C]}
(118228) 1996 TQ66	October 8, 1996	MPC ^{[A]}^{[B]}^{[C]}
^{A} with David C. Jewitt^{B} with Chad Trujillo^{C} with Jane Luu

Jun Chen is a Chinese American astronomer and discoverer of minor planets.

She obtained her BS at Beijing University in 1990, and obtained her PhD from the University of Hawaiʻi at Mānoa in 1997. Working together with David Jewitt and Jane Luu and other astronomers, she has co-discovered a number of Kuiper belt objects. The Minor Planet Center credits her with the co-discovery of 10 minor planets from 1994–1997.

She is currently working as a software developer in private industry.

== See also ==
- List of minor planet discoverers § J. Chen
