= (523671) 2013 FZ27 =

Kuiper Belt object

(523671) 2013 FZ_{27}
Discovery
- Discovered by: Scott Sheppard; Chad Trujillo
- Discovery site: Cerro Tololo (807)
- Discovery date: 16 March 2013

Designations
- Minor planet category: TNO · distant other TNO

Orbital characteristics
- Epoch 27 April 2019 (JD 2458600.5)
- Uncertainty parameter 1
- Observation arc: 17.07 yr (6,234 d)
- Earliest precovery date: 20 February 2001
- Aphelion: 58.713 AU
- Perihelion: 37.574 AU
- Semi-major axis: 48.143 AU
- Eccentricity: 0.2196
- Orbital period (sidereal): 334.05 yr (122,013 d)
- Mean anomaly: 282.75°
- Mean motion: 0° 0^{m} 10.8^{s} / day
- Inclination: 14.059°
- Longitude of ascending node: 285.22°
- Argument of perihelion: 341.93°
- Known satellites: 0

Physical characteristics
- Mean diameter: 561 km (est.); 584 km 335–748 km (calculated, using H=4.5 and albedo = 0.25 ~ 0.05)
- Geometric albedo: 0.09 (est.)
- Absolute magnitude (H): 4.24; 4.6

(523671) 2013 FZ_{27} is a trans-Neptunian object located in the Kuiper belt in the outermost region of the Solar System, approximately 570 kilometers (350 miles) in diameter. It was discovered on 16 March 2013, by American astronomers Scott Sheppard and Chad Trujillo at the CTIO in Chile.

2013 FZ_{27} has not yet been imaged by high-resolution telescopes, so it has no known moons. The Hubble Space Telescope is planned to image it in 2026, which should determine if it has significantly sized moons.

== Numbering and naming ==
This minor planet was numbered by the Minor Planet Center on 25 September 2018 (M.P.C. 111778). It was given the wrong discovery credit in the initial MPC Circular, and the MPC issued an Errata on 6 April 2019 on MPC 112429 correcting the mistake and giving credit to Scott S. Sheppard and Chad Trujillo. As of June 2025, it has not been named.

== Observations ==
2013 FZ_{27} was announced on 2 April 2014, when American astronomers Scott Sheppard and Chad Trujillo at the CTIO in Chile published their observations in a Minor Planet Electronic Circular. At the time the object was at 49 AU from the Sun and had an apparent magnitude of 21.1.

2013 FZ_{27}'s observation arc begins with a precovery taken by the Sloan Digital Sky Survey on 20 February 2001, over 10 years before its discovery observation at Cerro Tololo. The Pan-STARRS-1 survey at the Haleakala Observatory also found precovery observations.

== Orbit and classification ==
2013 FZ_{27} is a trans-Neptunian object (TNO), located beyond the orbit of Neptune (30.1 AU). Johnston's Archive classifies it as an unspecific "other TNO", meaning that the minor planet is neither a resonant nor a classical TNO. Taking the mean of the two magnitudes, and using the standard 0.25 ~ 0.05 range for minor planets of unknown albedo, a wide 335-to-748 km spread can be estimated for the diameter.

2013 FZ_{27} orbits the Sun at a distance of 37.6–58.7 AU once every 334 years and 1 month (122,013 days; semi-major axis of 48.14 AU). Its orbit has an eccentricity of 0.22 and an inclination of 14° with respect to the ecliptic.

== Physical characteristics ==
=== Diameter and albedo ===
According to Michael Brown and Johnston's Archive, 2013 FZ_{27} measures 561 and 584 kilometers in diameter, based on an absolute magnitude of 4.6 and 4.4 (Note: assuming the JA uses JPL/MPC data as seems to be the general case; the estimate correlates with a generic mathematical derivation) respectively. Both sources assume a standard albedo of 0.09 for the body's surface. As of 2018, no physical characteristics have been determined from photometric observations. The body's rotation period, pole and shape remain unknown.

Based on its size of 561 and 584 kilometers, it most likely belongs to the proposed class of "mid-sized" TNOs between 400 and 1,000 km (250 and 620 mi) in diameter, which are believed to represent the transition between small, low-density TNOs and large, high-density dwarf planets. Planetary scientists have hypothesized that mid-sized TNOs should have highly porous and unheated interiors, because TNOs in this size range (namely Uni and Gǃkúnǁʼhòmdímà) have been found to have low densities around 1 g/cm^{3}.
