= (15875) 1996 TP66 =

Resonant trans-Neptunian object

(15875) 1996 TP_{66}
- Orbital diagram with 1996 TP_{66} being well inside the orbit of Neptune

Discovery
- Discovered by: J. X. Luu; D. C. Jewitt; C. Trujillo
- Discovery site: Mauna Kea Obs.
- Discovery date: 11 October 1996

Designations
- Minor planet category: TNO · plutino distant

Orbital characteristics
- Epoch 9 June 2026 (JD 2461200.5)
- Uncertainty parameter 2
- Observation arc: 24.25 yr (8,858 d)
- Aphelion: 52.955 AU
- Perihelion: 26.457 AU
- Semi-major axis: 39.706 AU
- Eccentricity: 0.3337
- Orbital period (sidereal): 250.21 yr (91,387 d)
- Mean anomaly: 37.111°
- Mean motion: 0° 0^{m} 14.04^{s} / day
- Inclination: 5.6803°
- Longitude of ascending node: 316.83°
- Time of perihelion: 19 May 2000
- Argument of perihelion: 76.181°
- Uranus MOID: 6.96 AU (1.04 billion km)
- Neptune MOID: 1.14 AU (171 million km) (Note: A strong 3:2 resonance with Neptune prevents 1996 TP_{66} from getting this close.)

Physical characteristics
- Mean diameter: 154±34 km
- Geometric albedo: 0.074
- Spectral type: RR; B–V = 1.050; V–R = 0.660; V–I = 1.310
- Apparent magnitude: 21.6
- Absolute magnitude (H): 6.79±0.33; 7.0; 7.39; 7.51±0.09

(15875) 1996 TP_{66} is a resonant trans-Neptunian object of the plutino population, located in the outermost region of the Solar System, approximately 154 kilometers (96 miles) in diameter. It was discovered on 11 October 1996, by astronomers Jane Luu, David C. Jewitt and Chad Trujillo at the Mauna Kea Observatories, Hawaii, in the United States. The very reddish RR-type with a highly eccentric orbit has been near its perihelion around the time of its discovery. This minor planet was numbered in 2000 and has since not been named. It is probably not a dwarf planet candidate due to its small size.

== Orbit and classification ==
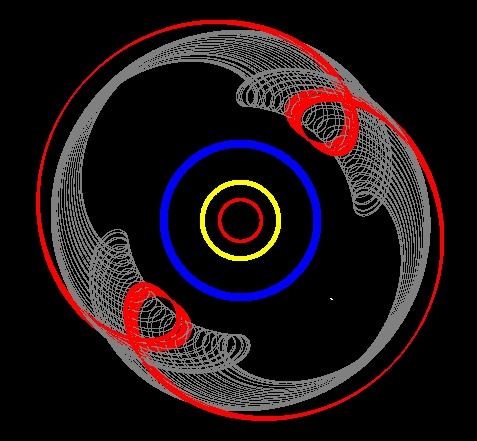
Plutino Resonance: motion of 1996 TP_{66} (red) and Pluto (grey) in a rotating frame with Neptune held stationary (equal to its orbital period)

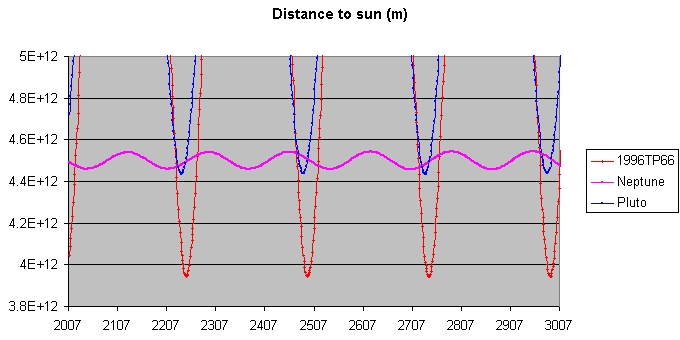
Distance to the Sun for 1996 TP_{66} (orange) Pluto (blue), and Neptune (pink) over a 1,000 year period

1996 TP_{66} belongs to the dynamical population of plutinos, named after its largest member, Pluto. Plutinos are resonant trans-Neptunian objects in a 2:3 orbital resonance with Neptune, which means that they orbit the Sun exactly twice while Neptune orbits the Sun three times.

It orbits the Sun at a distance of 26.3–52.0 AU once every 244 years and 10 months (89,435 days; semi-major axis of 39.14 AU). Its orbit has a notably high eccentricity of 0.33 and an inclination of 6° with respect to the ecliptic. Among the plutinos, 1996 TP_{66} has one of the most elliptical orbits, with a perihelion almost halfway between Uranus (19.2 AU) and Neptune (30.1 AU). The body's observation arc begins with its official discovery observation at Mauna Kea in October 1996. Calculations by the Minor Planet Center in 1997 showed that the eccentric orbit of 1996 TP_{66} comes within 6.9 AU of Uranus and stays more than 22.6 AU from Neptune over a 14,000-year period centered on the present.

=== Inside Neptune's orbit ===
On 19 May 2000, this object came closest to the Sun (perihelion) at 26.37 AU, and moved outside the orbit of Neptune (which has a semi-major axis of 30.1 AU) in late 2021.

Like Pluto, this plutino spends part of its orbit closer to the Sun than Neptune. Like all resonant trans-Neptunian objects its orbit is dominated by Neptune. Simulations by the Deep Ecliptic Survey (DES) show that over the next 10 million years 1996 TP_{66} can acquire a perihelion distance (q_{min}) as small as 25.9 AU. Objects like the plutinos Huya and 2004 EW_{95} are currently inside the orbit of Neptune.

== Numbering and naming ==
This minor planet was numbered by the Minor Planet Center on 26 July 2000 and received the number 15875 in the minor planet catalog (M.P.C. 40993). As of 2025, it has not been named.

== Physical characteristics ==
1996 TP_{66} has a RR taxonomic class, with "very red" surface in the visible (rather than a "neutral" or "grey-blue" one for objects of the BB class) and a flat featureless infrared spectrum. In 2015, Irina Belskaya published the following color indices: B–V (1.050), V–R (0.660) and V–I (1.310). The resulting B–R magnitude is 1.71. These indices agree with the results obtained by the Herschel Space Observatory (Mommert): B–V (1.030), V–R (0.660) and V–I (1.320), and also agree with previous measurements by Olivier Hainaut: B–V (1.031), V–R (0.655) and V–I (1.324), as well as B–V (0.984), V–R (0.654) and V–I (11.337) from in 2012 and 2002, respectively. The numerous results are summarized at the Small Body Data Ferret.

=== Diameter and albedo ===
According to the survey carried out by the Herschel Space Telescope using its PACS instrument, 1996 TP_{66} measures 154.0+28.8
−33.7 kilometers in diameter and its surface has an albedo of 0.074+0.063
−0.031. The results supersedes a previous study that gave a much larger diameter of 350 kilometers with a lower albedo of 0.03. According to Michael Brown, it is "probably not" a dwarf planet candidate, due to its relatively small diameter estimated at 158 kilometers. The Collaborative Asteroid Lightcurve Link assumes an albedo of 0.10 and derives a diameter of 139.81 kilometers based on an absolute magnitude of 7.39.

=== Rotation period ===
1996 TP_{66} was part of a rotational lightcurve study which was published in the journal Nature in 1999. The photometric observations gave a brightness variation of no more than 0.12 magnitude, which is indicative of a rather spherical shape. As of 2018, the body's rotation period and pole remain unknown.
