= (469306) 1999 CD158 =

Trans-Neptunian object (TNO)

(469306) 1999 CD_{158}
Discovery
- Discovered by: J. X. Luu; D. C. Jewitt; C. Trujillo
- Discovery site: Mauna Kea Obs.
- Discovery date: 10 February 1999

Designations
- Minor planet category: TNO · res 4:7? distant · detached

Orbital characteristics
- Epoch 4 September 2017 (JD 2458000.5)
- Uncertainty parameter 3
- Observation arc: 16.18 yr (5,908 days)
- Aphelion: 50.139 AU
- Perihelion: 37.410 AU
- Semi-major axis: 43.775 AU
- Eccentricity: 0.1454
- Orbital period (sidereal): 289.63 yr (105,787 days)
- Mean anomaly: 250.48°
- Mean motion: 0° 0^{m} 12.24^{s} / day
- Inclination: 25.486°
- Longitude of ascending node: 119.03°
- Time of perihelion: ≈ 17 February 2107 ±3 days
- Argument of perihelion: 143.51°
- Known satellites: 0

Physical characteristics
- Mean diameter: <310 km (for assumed albedo)
- Synodic rotation period: 6.88±0.02 h
- Geometric albedo: >0.13
- Spectral type: IR · C B–V = 0.770 · 0.830 · 0.864 · 0.860; V–R = 0.630 · 0.510 · 0.520 · 0.520; V–I = 1.110 · 1.092 · 1.100
- Apparent magnitude: 21.8
- Absolute magnitude (H): 4.837±0.111 (R) · 5.28

(469306) 1999 CD_{158} is a resonant trans-Neptunian object from the circumstellar disc of the Kuiper belt, located in the outermost region of the Solar System. Assuming an albedo of greater than 13%, it measures less than 310 kilometers (190 miles) in diameter. It was discovered on 10 February 1999, by American astronomers Jane Luu, David Jewitt, and Chad Trujillo at Mauna Kea Observatories on the Big Island of Hawaii, United States.

== Orbit and classification ==
1999 CD_{158} is a candidate member of the Haumea family, the only collisional group of trans-Neptunian objects currently determined. It is also sub-classified as a resonant trans-Neptunian object, as it stays in a 4:7 orbital resonance with the ice giant Neptune, which means, that for every seven orbits of Neptune around the Sun, it makes four orbits. It orbits the Sun at a distance of 37.4–50.1 AU once every 289 years and 8 months (105,787 days). Its orbit has an eccentricity of 0.15 and an inclination of 25° with respect to the ecliptic.

Its observation arc begins with its official discovery observation at Mauna Kea in 1999, as no precovery images were taken and no prior identifications were made. As of 2017 its current position is at 46.7 AU from the Sun.

== Physical characteristics ==
=== Photometry ===
Photometric observation of 1999 CD_{158} in March 2015, gave a classically shaped bimodal lightcurve with a rotation period of 6.88 hours and a large brightness variation of 0.49 magnitude (U=3-).

Observations with the New Technology Telescope at ESO's La Silla Observatory in Chile in 2008, determined the body's BVRI colors to be 0.770 (B–V), 0.630 (V–R), and 1.110 (V–I) for their respective passbands. Color indices have since been repeatedly measured.

=== Diameter ===
Analysis of data from the Herschel Space Telescope suggests that 1999 CD_{158} measures at most 310 kilometers in diameter.

== Naming ==
As of 2025, this minor planet remains unnamed.
