= (15874) 1996 TL66 =

Trans-Neptunian object

(15874) 1996 TL_{66}
Discovery
- Discovered by: D. C. Jewitt; J. X. Luu; J. Chen; C. A. Trujillo
- Discovery site: Maunakea Obs.
- Discovery date: 9 October 1996

Designations
- Minor planet category: TNO · SDO distant

Orbital characteristics
- Epoch 13 January 2016 (JD 2457400.5)
- Uncertainty parameter 2
- Observation arc: 5883 days (16.11 yr)
- Aphelion: 131.75 AU (19.710 Tm)
- Perihelion: 35.057 AU (5.2445 Tm)
- Semi-major axis: 83.403 AU (12.4769 Tm)
- Eccentricity: 0.57967
- Orbital period (sidereal): 761.70 yr (278211 d)
- Mean anomaly: 6.8505°
- Mean motion: 0° 0^{m} 4.658^{s} / day
- Inclination: 24.006°
- Longitude of ascending node: 217.82°
- Argument of perihelion: 184.79°

Physical characteristics
- Mean diameter: 339±20 km 575±115 km
- Synodic rotation period: 12 h (0.50 d)
- Geometric albedo: 0.110+0.021 −0.015; 0.035+0.02 −0.01
- Spectral type: Prominent water (H_{2}O/"bowl" type); B–V = 0.687±0.072; V–R = 0.369±0.052
- Apparent magnitude: 21
- Absolute magnitude (H): 5.4

(15874) 1996 TL_{66} is a trans-Neptunian object of the scattered disc orbiting in the outermost region of the Solar System.

The Spitzer Space Telescope estimated this object to be about 575 kilometres (357 mi) in diameter, but 2012 estimates from the Herschel Space Observatory place the diameter closer to 339 kilometres (211 mi). It is not a detached object, since its perihelion (closest approach to the Sun) is under the influence of Neptune. Light-curve-amplitude analysis suggests that it is a spheroid.

== Discovery ==
Discovered in 1996 by David C. Jewitt et al., it was the first object to be categorized as a scattered-disk object (SDO), although (48639) 1995 TL8, discovered a year earlier, was later recognised as a scattered-disk object. It was considered one the largest known trans-Neptunian objects at the time of the discovery, being placed second after Pluto. It came to perihelion in 2001.

== Orbit and size ==
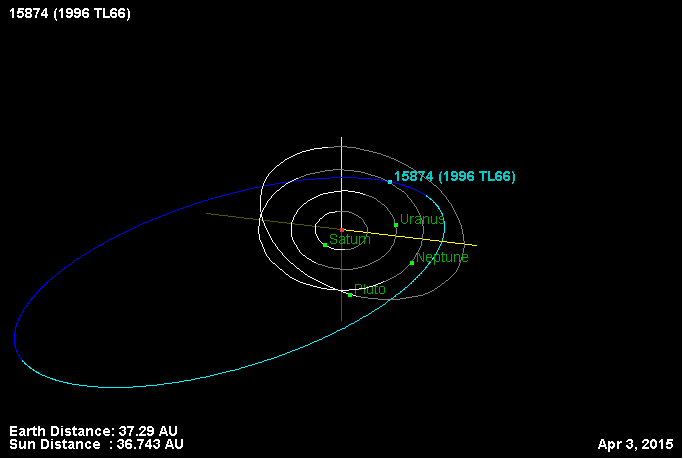
1996 TL_{66}'s orbit

1996 TL_{66} orbits the Sun with a semi-major axis of 83.9 AU but is currently only 35 AU from the Sun with an apparent magnitude of 21. In 2007, the Spitzer Space Telescope estimated it to have a low albedo with a diameter of about 575±115 km. More recent measurements in 2012 by the 'TNOs are Cool' research project and reanalysis of older data have resulted in a new estimate of these figures. It is now assumed that it has a higher albedo and the diameter was revised downward to 339±20 km. Light-curve-amplitude analysis shows only small deviations, suggesting 1996 TL_{66} has a spheroidal shape with small albedo spots.
