= (120216) 2004 EW95 =

Plutino

(120216) 2004 EW_{95}
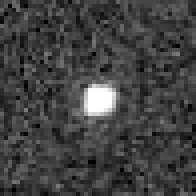
- Hubble Space Telescope image of 2004 EW_{95} taken in 2010

Discovery
- Discovered by: Kitt Peak Obs.
- Discovery date: 14 March 2004

Designations
- Minor planet category: TNO; plutino

Orbital characteristics
- Epoch 23 March 2018 (JD 2458200.5)
- Uncertainty parameter 2
- Observation arc: 4847 days (13.27 yr)
- Aphelion: 52.590 AU (7.8674 Tm)
- Perihelion: 26.975 AU (4.0354 Tm)
- Semi-major axis: 39.783 AU (5.9515 Tm)
- Eccentricity: 0.32193
- Orbital period (sidereal): 250.93 yr (91652 d)
- Mean anomaly: 359.95°
- Mean motion: 0° 0^{m} 14.219^{s} / day (n)
- Inclination: 29.234°
- Longitude of ascending node: 25.704°
- Argument of perihelion: 204.67°
- Known satellites: 0
- Earth MOID: 25.99 AU (3.888 Tm)
- Jupiter MOID: 21.69 AU (3.245 Tm)
- Uranus MOID: 9 AU (1.3 Tm)

Physical characteristics
- Dimensions: 291 km
- Geometric albedo: 0.04 (dark)
- Spectral type: Prominent water (H_{2}O/"bowl" type)
- Apparent magnitude: ~21.0; 21.04±0.04
- Absolute magnitude (H): 6.3

(120216) 2004 EW_{95} is a resonant trans-Neptunian object in the Kuiper belt located in the outermost regions of the Solar System. It measures approximately 291 kilometers in diameter. It has more carbon than typical of KBOs, and the first to be confirmed as having this composition in this region of space. It is thought to have originated closer to the Sun, perhaps even in the main asteroid belt.

== Orbit ==
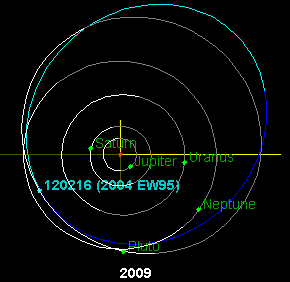
2004 EW_{95} is currently well inside the orbit of Neptune.

Like Pluto, 2004 EW_{95} is classified as a plutino. It stays in a 2:3 resonance with Neptune. For every 2 orbits that a plutino makes, Neptune orbits 3 times.

2004 EW_{95} is currently 27.0 AU from the Sun, and came to perihelion (q=26.98 AU) in April 2018. This means that this object is currently inside the orbit of the planet Neptune. Like Pluto, this plutino spends part of its orbit closer to the Sun than Neptune is even though their orbits are controlled by Neptune. (Plutinos Huya and (15875) 1996 TP66 are even currently inside the orbit of Neptune.) Simulations by the Deep Ecliptic Survey (DES) show that over the next 10 million years 2004 EW_{95} can acquire a perihelion distance (q_{min}) as small as 24.6 AU.

It comes within 9 AU (1.3 billion km) of Uranus and stays more than 21 AU from Neptune over a 14,000 year period. 2004 EW_{95} has been observed 158 times with an observation arc of 13 years and has an orbit quality of 2.

== Physical characteristics ==
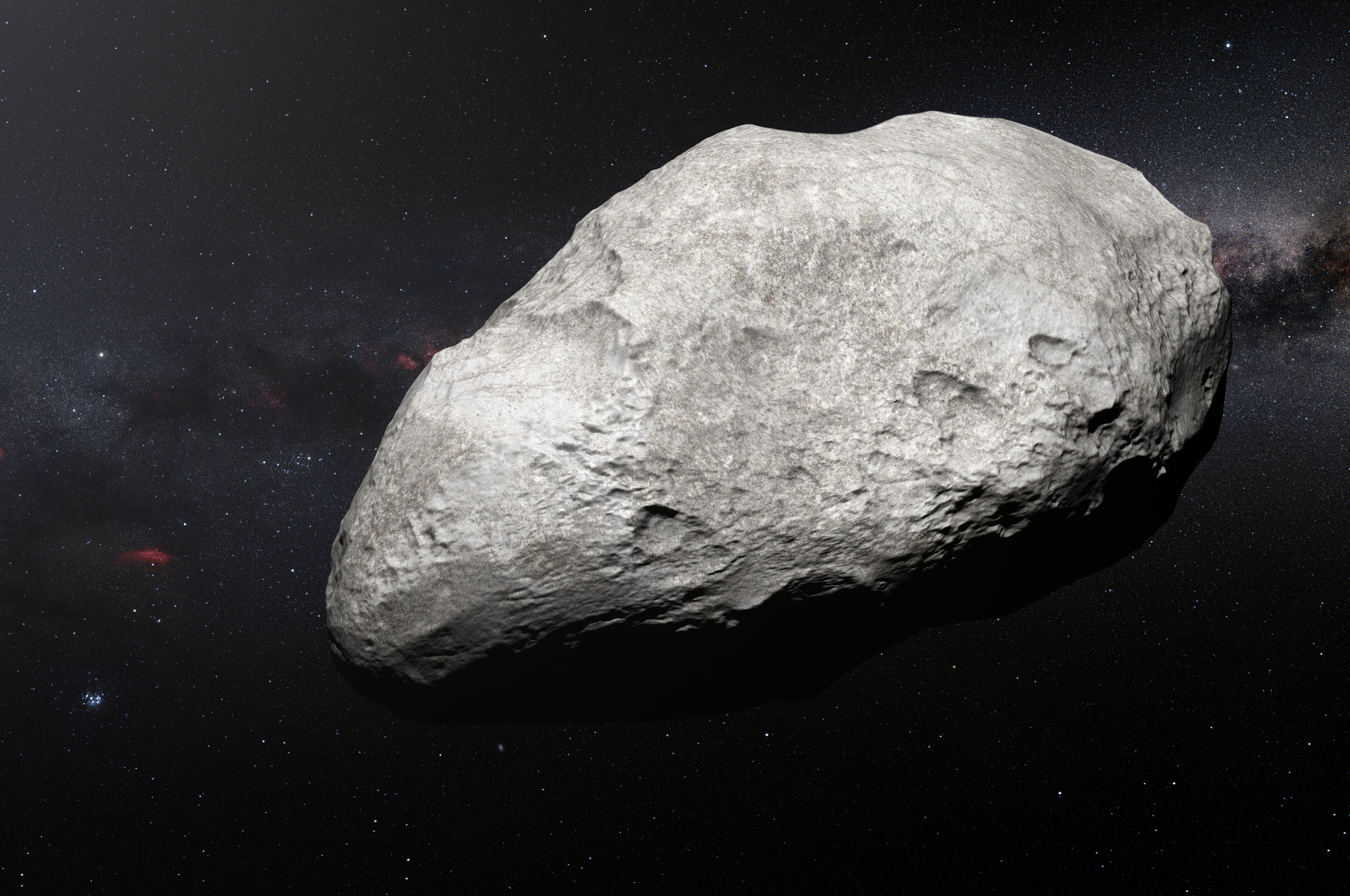
Artist's impression of the plutino and possible former C-type asteroid 2004 EW_{95}

2004 EW_{95} has a dark albedo of 0.04, giving it a diameter of about 291 km. Its reflectance spectrum bears striking resemblance to those of some hydrated C-type asteroids, indicating that this object possibly formed in the same environment as the C-type asteroids found today in the outer asteroid belt.

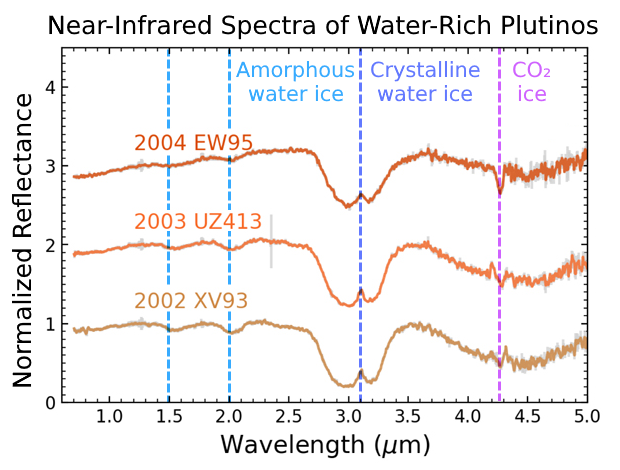
Near-infrared spectra of three water ice-rich plutinos observed by JWST, including 2004 EW_{95} in the top. Water and carbon dioxide ices are present in all three objects.

Unlike the majority of small objects in the Kuiper belt observed so far, the visible spectrum of 2004 EW_{95} has two features, each respectively associated with ferric oxides and phyllosilicates. The presence of a phyllosilicate feature in the spectrum of a minor planet indicates that the rocky component of its composition has been altered by the presence of liquid water at some point since its formation. For this to have occurred on 2004 EW_{95} in its current orbit and at temperatures of ~35K, significant quantities of thermal energy would have been required. While this energy could have been delivered by a very large chance collision, the strong overall similarity between the modern C-type asteroids in the outer asteroid belt and 2004 EW_{95} suggests that these objects formed in the same region of the early Sun's protoplanetary disk, much closer to the Sun and at higher temperatures.

The Grand tack hypothesis predicts that the primitive C-type asteroids were dispersed from their formation location by the migrations of Jupiter and Saturn and many were injected into the outer asteroid belt where they are found today. By the same mechanism (and others that result from planetary formation), simulations show that C-types can also be thrown outward to the trans-Neptunian region, where later they may become captured into the mean-motion resonances of Neptune.

== See also ==
- List of trans-Neptunian objects
- List of exceptional asteroids
