= (84719) 2002 VR128 =

Trans-Neptunian object (TNO)

(84719) 2002 VR_{128}
Discovery
- Discovered by: Michael E. Brown; Chad Trujillo
- Discovery site: Palomar Observatory
- Discovery date: 3 November 2002

Designations
- Minor planet category: TNO; plutino

Orbital characteristics
- Epoch 13 January 2016 (JD 2457400.5)
- Uncertainty parameter 3
- Observation arc: 9153 days (25.06 yr)
- Aphelion: 49.650 AU (7.4275 Tm)
- Perihelion: 28.999 AU (4.3382 Tm)
- Semi-major axis: 39.325 AU (5.8829 Tm)
- Eccentricity: 0.26257
- Orbital period (sidereal): 246.61 yr (90072.7 d)
- Mean anomaly: 73.453°
- Mean motion: 0° 0^{m} 14.388^{s} / day
- Inclination: 14.040°
- Longitude of ascending node: 23.152°
- Argument of perihelion: 287.87°
- Known satellites: 0
- Earth MOID: 28.0112 AU (4.19042 Tm)
- Jupiter MOID: 24.0604 AU (3.59938 Tm)

Physical characteristics
- Dimensions: 448.5+42.1 −43.2 km
- Geometric albedo: 0.052+0.027 −0.018
- Temperature: ≈ 44 K
- Spectral type: B−V = 0.94±0.03; V−R = 0.60±0.02
- Absolute magnitude (H): 5.58±0.37

(84719) 2002 VR_{128} is a trans-Neptunian object (TNO). It was discovered in 2002 by Michael Brown and Chad Trujillo. The object is a plutino, an object in 2:3 orbital resonance with Neptune.

The size of 2002 VR_{128} was measured by the Herschel Space Telescope to be 449+42
−43 km. The surface of 2002 VR_{128} is red in the visible spectral range.
