= (26375) 1999 DE9 =

Trans-Neptunian object

(26375) 1999 DE_{9}
Discovery
- Discovered by: Chadwick A. Trujillo and Jane X. Luu
- Discovery date: 20 February 1999

Designations
- Minor planet category: TNO; 2:5 resonance

Orbital characteristics
- Epoch 5 May 2025 (JD 2460800.5)
- Uncertainty parameter 2
- Observation arc: 12873 days (35.24 yr)
- Aphelion: 78.581 AU (11.7556 Tm)
- Perihelion: 32.159 AU (4.8109 Tm)
- Semi-major axis: 55.370 AU (8.2832 Tm)
- Eccentricity: 0.41919
- Orbital period (sidereal): 412.02 yr (150493 d)
- Average orbital speed: 3.81 km/s
- Mean anomaly: 34.314°
- Mean motion: 0° 0^{m} 8.612^{s} / day
- Inclination: 7.6148°
- Longitude of ascending node: 322.908°
- Argument of perihelion: 159.154°
- Known satellites: 0
- Earth MOID: 31.176 AU (4.6639 Tm)
- Jupiter MOID: 26.8847 AU (4.02189 Tm)

Physical characteristics
- Dimensions: 461 ± 45 km
- Synodic rotation period: 24 h (1.0 d)
- Geometric albedo: 0.06–0.08
- Temperature: 48.1 K (perihelion)
- Spectral type: CO_{2}-type ("double-dip")
- Absolute magnitude (H): 4.89

(26375) 1999 DE_{9} is a trans-Neptunian object. Light-curve-amplitude analysis shows only small deviations, suggesting 1999 DE_{9} is a spheroid with small albedo spots. Measurements by the Spitzer Space Telescope estimate that it is 461 ± 45 km in diameter. It was discovered in 1999 by Chad Trujillo and Jane X. Luu.

1999 DE_{9}'s orbit is in 2:5 resonance with Neptune's. Spectral analysis has shown traces of ice.

The Trans-neptunian Atmospheres and Belts Analysis through Stellar-occultation Coordinated Observations project has detected an occultation by 1999 DE_{9} on 9 March 2024, though the results were not yet published.
