= 79360 Sila–Nunam =

Binary classical Kuiper belt object

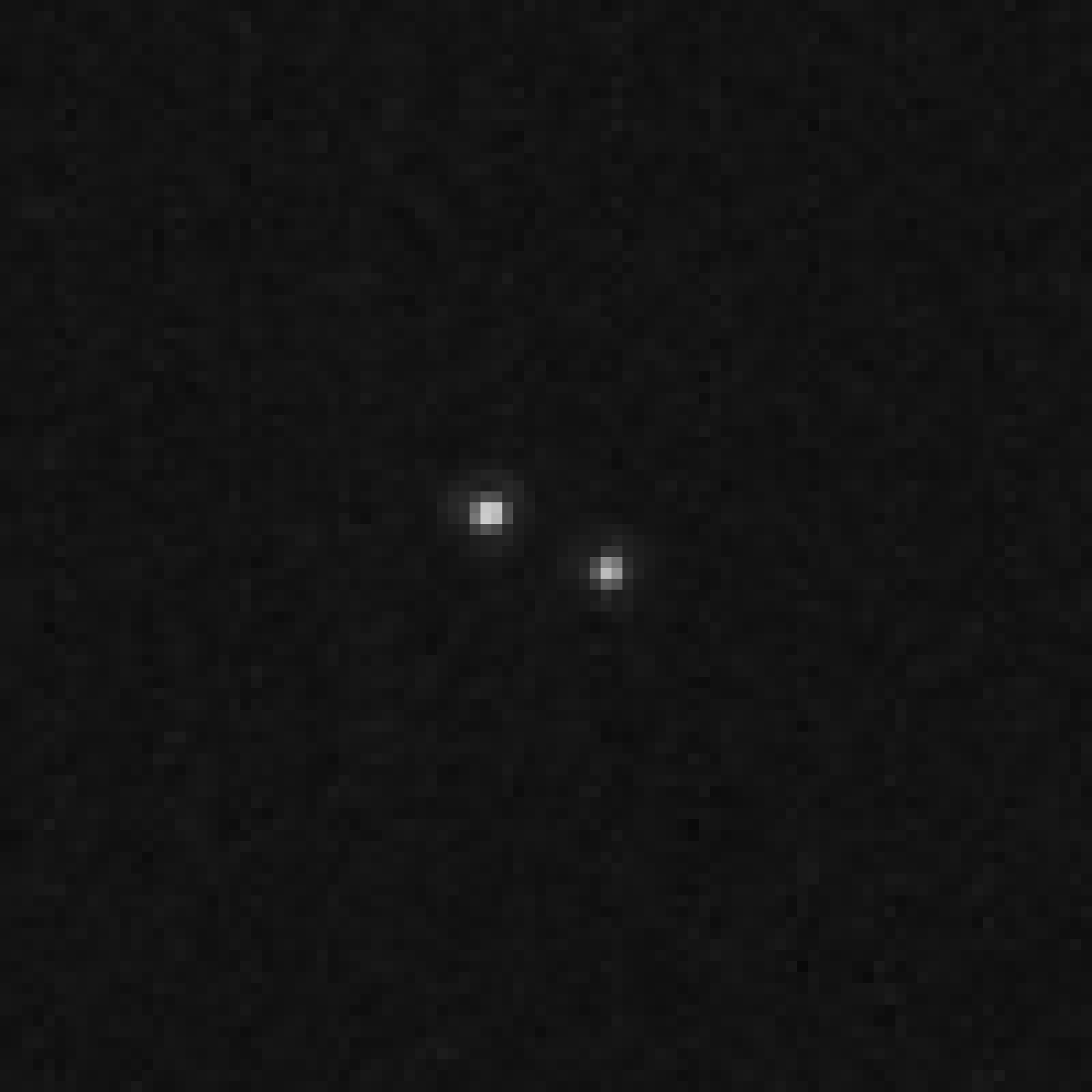
- Sila–Nunam imaged by the Hubble Space Telescope in 2004

Discovery
- Discovered by: J. X. Luu; D. C. Jewitt; C. A. Trujillo; J. Chen
- Discovery site: Mauna Kea Obs.
- Discovery date: 4 February 1997

Designations
- Pronunciation: /ˈsiːlə ˈnuːnəm/
- Alternative designations: 1997 CS_{29}
- Minor planet category: TNO (cubewano)
- Adjectives: Silaupian, Nunaupian

Orbital characteristics
- Epoch 13 January 2016 (JD 2457400.5)
- Uncertainty parameter 3
- Observation arc: 6940 days (19.00 yr)
- Aphelion: 44.8452 AU (6.70875 Tm)
- Perihelion: 43.3862 AU (6.49048 Tm)
- Semi-major axis: 44.1157 AU (6.59961 Tm)
- Eccentricity: 0.016536
- Orbital period (sidereal): 293.02 yr (107026 d)
- Mean anomaly: 331.884°
- Mean motion: 0.00336367°/day
- Inclination: 2.240951°
- Longitude of ascending node: 304.34152°
- Time of perihelion: ≈ 20 October 2055 ±3 months
- Argument of perihelion: 222.597°
- Known satellites: 1 at 2,777 ± 19 km (1,725 ± 10 mi)
- Earth MOID: 42.3938 AU (6.34202 Tm)
- Jupiter MOID: 37.9599 AU (5.67872 Tm)

Physical characteristics
- Dimensions: ≈ 250±30 km (Sila) ≈ 235±28 km (Nunam) (335+41 −42 km combined)
- Mass: 1.084 ± 0.022×10^{19} kg (combined) 5.89×10^{18} kg (Sila) 4.892×10^{18} kg (Nunam)
- Mean density: 0.72^{+0.37}_{−0.22} g/cm^{3}
- Synodic rotation period: 300.24 h (12.510 d)
- Sidereal rotation period: 12.50995 ± 0.00036 d
- Geometric albedo: 0.086^{+0.026}_{−0.017}
- Temperature: 41.9 K (perihelion)
- Spectral type: Spectrally prominent organics, organics-type ("Cliff type TNO"); U−B=0.73; B−V=1.08; V−R=0.66±0.04; B−R=1.74; V−I=1.25±0.03; R−J=1.4; V−J=2.06±0.03; J−H=0.38±0.08; V−H=2.45±0.08
- Apparent magnitude: 21.54–21.78 (2014–2015)
- Absolute magnitude (H): (combined) 5.5, (individual) 6.2 & 6.3 (diff. = 0.12), 5.2

79360 Sila–Nunam (provisional designation 1997 CS_{29}) is a cold classical Kuiper belt object (cubewano) and binary system made up of components of almost equal size, called Sila and Nunam, orbiting beyond Neptune in the Solar System. The name of the system is the combined names of the two bodies, Sila and Nunam.

== Discovery ==
Sila–Nunam was discovered on 4 February 1997 by Jane X. Luu, David C. Jewitt, Chad Trujillo, and Jun Chen at the Mauna Kea Observatory, Hawaii, and given the provisional designation 1997 CS_{29}. It was resolved as a binary system in Hubble observations of 22 October 2002 by Denise C. Stephens and Keith S. Noll and announced on 5 October 2005.

== Name ==
The two components are named after Inuit deities. Sila "air" (Iñupiaq siḷa [siʎə], Inuktitut sila) is the Inuit god of the sky, weather, and life force. Nuna "earth" (Iñupiaq amn Inuktitut nuna-m [nunəm]) is the Earth goddess, in some traditions Sila's wife. Nuna created the land animals and, in some traditions, the Inuit (in other traditions Sila created the first people out of wet sand). Sila breathed life into the Inuit.

== Orbit ==
Sila–Nunam is a dynamically cold classical system (cubewano). It orbits very close to 4:7 mean-motion resonance with Neptune.

== Physical characteristics ==
In 2010, thermal flux from Sila–Nunam in the far-infrared was measured by the Herschel Space Telescope. As a result, its size, while it was assumed to be a single body, was estimated to lie within the range of 250 to 420 km (155 to 260 mi). Now that it is known to be a binary system, one body 95% the size of the other, the diameters are estimated to be 243 and 230 kilometres (151 and 143 mi).

Sila–Nunam is very red in visible light and has a flat featureless spectrum in the near-infrared. There are no water ice absorption bands in its near-infrared spectrum, which resembles that of Ixion.

Sila–Nunam experiences periodic changes in brightness with the full period, which is equal to the orbital binary period (see below). The light curve is double peaked with the secondary period equal to half of the full period. The rotation of both components of the system is synchronously locked with the orbital motion and both bodies are elongated with their long axes pointing to each other. From 2009 to 2017 Sila–Nunam experienced mutual occultation events.

== Double system ==
Sila and Nunam are so close in size (within 5%) that they may be thought of as a double cubewano. Sila is approximately 250 km in diameter and Nunam 236 km. Their albedo is about 9%. They orbit at a distance of 2,777 ± 19 km (1,726 ± 12 mi) every 12.51 days:

Semi-major axis:	2,777 ± 19 km
Orbital period:	12.50995 ± 0.00036 d
Eccentricity:	0.020 ± 0.015°
Inclination:	103.51 ± 0.39°

Each has apparently been resurfaced with ejecta from impacts on the other.
