= (33001) 1997 CU29 =

Cubewano

(33001) 1997 CU_{29}
- The orbit of 1997 CU_{29}.

Discovery
- Discovered by: David C. Jewitt; Jane X. Luu; Chadwick A. Trujillo; Jun Chen
- Discovery date: 6 February 1997

Designations
- Minor planet category: TNO (cubewano) (cold)

Orbital characteristics
- Epoch 13 January 2016 (JD 2457400.5)
- Uncertainty parameter 3
- Observation arc: 5880 days (16.10 yr)
- Aphelion: 45.29450 AU (6.775961 Tm)
- Perihelion: 42.07164 AU (6.293828 Tm)
- Semi-major axis: 43.68307 AU (6.534894 Tm)
- Eccentricity: 0.036889
- Orbital period (sidereal): 288.72 yr (105455 d)
- Average orbital speed: 4.52 km/s
- Mean anomaly: 248.774°
- Mean motion: 0° 0^{m} 12.29^{s} / day
- Inclination: 1.45231°
- Longitude of ascending node: 350.339°
- Argument of perihelion: 259.868°
- Earth MOID: 41.0568 AU (6.14201 Tm)
- Jupiter MOID: 36.7177 AU (5.49289 Tm)

Physical characteristics
- Dimensions: 280 km
- Mass: 1.3×10^{19}? kg
- Mean density: 2.0? g/cm^{3}
- Equatorial surface gravity: 0.0641? m/s^{2}
- Equatorial escape velocity: 0.1213? km/s
- Sidereal rotation period: ? d
- Geometric albedo: 0.10?
- Temperature: ~ 42 K
- Spectral type: ?
- Absolute magnitude (H): 6.5

(33001) 1997 CU_{29} is a cold classical Kuiper belt object, or cubewano. It has a perihelion (closest approach to the Sun) at 41.6 AU and an aphelion (farthest approach from the Sun) of 45.1 AU. 1997 CU_{29} is about 280 km in diameter. It was discovered on February 6, 1997, by David C. Jewitt, Jane X. Luu, Chad Trujillo, and Jun Chen at the Mauna Kea Observatory, Hawaii.
