= (385185) 1993 RO =

Plutino

Discovery
- Discovered by: David C. Jewitt; Jane Luu
- Discovery date: 14 September 1993

Designations
- Minor planet category: Plutino (TNO)

Orbital characteristics
- Epoch 13 January 2016 (JD 2457400.5)
- Uncertainty parameter 4
- Observation arc: 6997 days (19.16 yr)
- Earliest precovery date: 10 August 1994
- Aphelion: 46.776 AU (6.9976 Tm)
- Perihelion: 31.492 AU (4.7111 Tm)
- Semi-major axis: 39.134 AU (5.8544 Tm)
- Eccentricity: 0.19528
- Orbital period (sidereal): 244.81 yr (89418.1 d)
- Mean anomaly: 26.984°
- Mean motion: 0.0040260°/day
- Inclination: 3.7196°
- Longitude of ascending node: 170.4038°
- Argument of perihelion: 188.41°
- Earth MOID: 30.4867 AU (4.56075 Tm)
- Jupiter MOID: 26.5264 AU (3.96829 Tm)

Physical characteristics
- Dimensions: ~92 km
- Geometric albedo: 0.09 (assumed)
- Absolute magnitude (H): 8.4

(385185) 1993 RO is a plutino. It was the first plutino discovered after Pluto itself, with 1993 RP and (15788) 1993 SB a day and two days later, respectively. The discovery was made in 1993 at the Mauna Kea Observatory with a 2.2-meter telescope. Very little is known about 1993 RO. The diameter estimate of ~90 km is based on the assumed albedo of 0.09.

Other Kuiper belt objects discovered in 1993 include (15788) 1993 SB, (15789) 1993 SC, and (181708) 1993 FW.

== See also ==
- List of trans-Neptunian objects
- Kuiper belt
