= Chen Jun (geographer) =

Chinese geographer

- Born: October 1956 (age 69); Huoqiu County, Anhui, China
- Education: Wuhan University
- Scientific career
- Fields: Surveying; Cartography
- Workplaces: National Geomatics Center of China (NGCC)

Chinese name
- Traditional Chinese: 陳軍
- Simplified Chinese: 陈军
Transcriptions
Standard Mandarin
- Hanyu Pinyin: Chén Jūn

Chen Jun (Chinese: 陈军; born October 1956) is a Chinese geographer and formerly director and chief engineer of the National Geomatics Center of China (NGCC). He was president of the International Society for Photogrammetry and Remote Sensing (ISPRS) between 2012 and 2016. He served two separate terms as president of the China Association for Geographic Information Society (CAGIS) from 1999 to 2003 and 2003 to 2007. He is a member of the China Land Science Society (CLSS).

== Biography ==
Chen was born in Huoqiu County, Anhui, in October 1956. During the Down to the Countryside Movement, he taught at Daimao Middle School (戴帽中学). In September 1975 he joined the Anhui Provincial Department of Surveying and Mapping as a worker. In December 1976, Chen was recommended by the department to study at Wuhan Technical University of Surveying and Mapping (now Wuhan University), where he received his master's degree under the supervision of Wang Zhizhuo and Yang Kai (杨凯). He arrived in France in 1981 to begin his education at the Institut géographique national on government scholarship and returned to China one year later. He taught at his alma mater between 1983 and 1995, what he was promoted to associate professor in 1987 and to full professor in 1992. In December 1995 he was transferred to the National Geomatics Center of China (NGCC), where he successively served as deputy director (1995–1998), acting director (1998–2000), and director (2000–2014). He also served as chief engineer at the center.

== Honours and awards ==
- 2000 National Science Fund for Distinguished Young Scholars
- 2003 Academician of the Eurasian Academy
- 2017 Academician of the International Academy of Astronautics (IAA)
- November 22, 2019 Member of the Chinese Academy of Engineering (CAE)
