= James Westphal =

James Adolph Westphal (June 13, 1930 – September 8, 2004) was an American academic, scientist, engineer, inventor and astronomer and Director of Caltech's Palomar Observatory from 1994 through 1997.

His participation played an important role in designing the main camera for the Hubble Space Telescope.

== Caltech ==
Westphal began his career at California Institute of Technology in 1961. His first job as senior engineer; and he remained at the Institute for the remainder of his career. He came to Caltech initially on a four-month leave of absence from Sinclair Research Labs in Tulsa, Oklahoma, but never left.

In 1971, Westphal joined the Caltech faculty an associate professor of planetary science; and he was named professor in 1976. Across a span of years, Westphal's interest in ground-based projects caused him to decline invitations to turn his attention to astronomical work, but when he finally agreed, his commitment and enthusiasm was unrestrained.

Former graduate student Richard Terrile remembers that Westphal "not only taught me about astronomy and science, but also about more down-to-earth topics like self-reliance, dealing with people, and how to keep focused when things go bad. Jim had a wonderful way of reducing a problem to its most basic form. He said, 'There are always two ways to deal with a problem: You can get angry and upset and then try and fix it, or you can just fix it. Which way would you rather work on it?'".

In addition to tenure, Westphal's talents earned him a MacArthur Fellowship in 1991—all without a Ph.D.

== Palomar ==
In 1973, Westphal built a silicon-intensified target camera for the 200-inch Hale Telescope at Palomar. The innovation was 20 times more sensitive to light than the photographic film then being used. That camera is now in the Smithsonian's National Air and Space Museum collection.

Gerry Neugebauer, who was Westphal's predecessor as Director of Palomar Observatory, explained, "What I liked most about Jim was how much he enjoyed science. He did fun stuff superbly and was interested in the way things really worked. Whatever he did, he saw new applications in totally different fields and was not afraid to try out a new technique or idea." This approach had consequences; and over his career he wrote 133 scientific papers.

== Awards and honors ==
- On July 1, 1996, the main-belt asteroid 1983 AD, discovered by B. A. Skiff on January 9, 1983, was renamed (6173) Jimwestphal in Westphal's honor.

== Selected works ==
- 1991 -- Wide Field/planetary Camera: Final Orbital/science Verification Report with S M Faber, Wide Field/Planetary Camera Investigation Definition Team. Baltimore, Maryland: Space Telescope Science Institute (U.S.). OCLC 25677856
