= 66652 Borasisi =

Kuiper belt binary

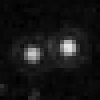
- Borasisi and its companion Pabu imaged by the Hubble Space Telescope in 2003

Discovery
- Discovered by: C. Trujillo, J. Luu and D. Jewitt
- Discovery date: 8 September 1999

Designations
- Pronunciation: /bɒrəˈsiːsi/
- Alternative designations: 1999 RZ_{253}
- Minor planet category: trans-Neptunian object cubewano SCATNEAR(?)

Orbital characteristics
- Epoch 13 January 2016 (JD 2457400.5)
- Uncertainty parameter 3
- Observation arc: 4790 days (13.11 yr)
- Aphelion: 47.291 AU (7.0746 Tm)
- Perihelion: 39.819 AU (5.9568 Tm)
- Semi-major axis: 43.555 AU (6.5157 Tm)
- Eccentricity: 0.085781
- Orbital period (sidereal): 287.45 yr (104991 d)
- Mean anomaly: 60.025°
- Mean motion: 0.0034289°/day
- Inclination: 0.56319°
- Longitude of ascending node: 84.722°
- Argument of perihelion: 194.98°
- Known satellites: Pabu /ˈpɑːbuː/ (137 km in diameter?)

Physical characteristics
- Mean diameter: 163+33 −66 km (combined); 126+25 −51 km (primary); 105+20 −42 km (secondary)
- Mass: (3.433±0.027)×10^{18} kg
- Mean density: 2.1+2.6 −1.2 g/cm^{3}
- Synodic rotation period: 6.4±1.0 h
- Geometric albedo: 0.236+0.438 −0.77
- Temperature: 42.5 K (perihelion)
- Spectral type: Spectrally prominent organics, organics-type ("Cliff type TNO"); V−R= 0.646 ± 0.058
- Absolute magnitude (H): 6.121 ± 0.070, 5.9

66652 Borasisi, or as a binary (66652) Borasisi–Pabu (provisional designation 1999 RZ_{253}), is a binary classical Kuiper belt object. It was discovered in September 1999 by Chad Trujillo, Jane X. Luu and David C. Jewitt and identified as a binary on 23 August 2003 by K. Noll and colleagues using the Hubble Space Telescope.

== Binary ==
Schematic illustration of two bodies with similar mass orbiting around a common barycenter (red cross) with elliptic orbits. Borasisi and Pabu interact similarly.

In 2003 it was discovered that Borasisi is a binary with the components of comparable size (about 100–130 km) orbiting the barycentre on a moderately elliptical orbit. The total system mass is about 3.4 × 10^{18} kg.

The companion (66652) Borasisi I, named Pabu, orbits its primary in 46.2888 ± 0.0018 days on an orbit with a semi-major axis of 4528 ± 12 km and an eccentricity 0.4700 ± 0.0018. The orbit is inclined with respect to the observer by about 54° meaning that is about 35° from the pole-on position.

== Physical properties ==
The surface of both components of the Borasisi–Pabu system is very red.

== Naming ==
Borasisi is named after a fictional creation deity taken from the novel Cat's Cradle by Kurt Vonnegut. In the book, Borasisi is the Sun and Pabu is the name of the Moon:

Borasisi, the sun, held Pabu, the moon, in his arms, and hoped that Pabu would bear him a fiery child. But poor Pabu gave birth to children that were cold, that did not burn; and Borasisi threw them away in disgust. These were the planets, who circled their terrible father at a safe distance. Then poor Pabu herself was cast away, and she went to live with her favorite child, which was Earth. Earth was Pabu's favorite because it had people on it; and the people looked up at her and loved her and sympathized.

== Exploration ==
Around 2005, Borasisi was considered as a target for the proposed New Horizons 2 after a Triton/Neptune flyby.
