= Chad Trujillo =

American astronomer (born 1973)

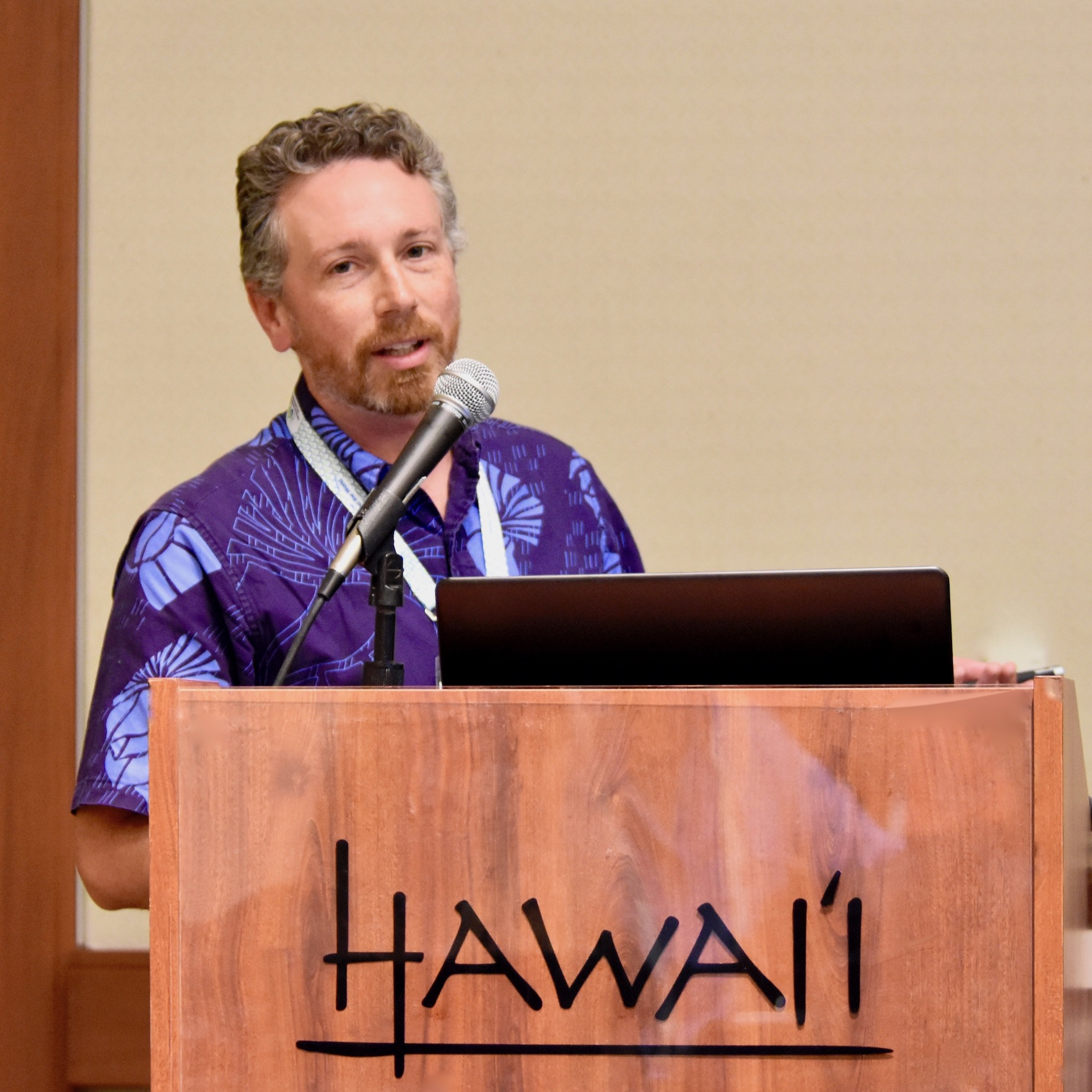
- Born: November 22, 1973 (age 52)
- Education: Massachusetts Institute of Technology; University of Hawaiʻi
- Known for: Discovery of Eris, Sedna and other trans-Neptunian objects
- Scientific career
- Fields: Planetary astronomy
- Institutions: Gemini Observatory; Northern Arizona University

Chadwick A. Trujillo (born November 22, 1973) is an American astronomer, discoverer of minor planets such as being the co-discoverer of Makemake, and the co-discoverer of Eris, the most massive dwarf planet known in the Solar System.

Trujillo works with computer software and has examined the orbits of the numerous trans-Neptunian objects (TNOs), which is the outer area of the Solar System that he specialized in. Trujillo, along with Michael Brown and David Rabinowitz, discovered Eris in 2003. As a result of the discovery of the satellite Dysnomia, Eris was the first TNO known to be more massive than Pluto.

== Career ==
Trujillo attended Oak Park and River Forest High School in Oak Park, Illinois. He received his B.Sc. in physics from the Massachusetts Institute of Technology in 1995, and was a member of the Xi chapter of Tau Epsilon Phi, and received his Ph.D. in astronomy from the University of Hawaiʻi in 2000.

Between 2000 and 2003 Trujillo was a postdoctoral scholar at Caltech. In 2003, he started working as an astronomer at the Gemini Observatory in Hawaii.

In 2013 Trujillo became head of the Adaptive Optics/Telescope Department at the Gemini Observatory, and continued until 2016. As of 2016, Trujillo is assistant professor at the department of Astronomy and Planetary Science at Northern Arizona University.

He studies the Kuiper belt and the outer Solar System.

== Discoveries ==
Minor planets discovered: 88
see § List of discovered minor planets

As of February 2026, Trujillo is credited by the Minor Planet Center with the discovery and co-discovery of 88 numbered minor planets between 1996 and 2017, including many trans-Neptunian objects (TNOs) from the Kuiper belt (see table). The last major TNO, Eris, was at first considered by him, his team, NASA, and many others to be the tenth planet, but the International Astronomical Union assigned it to the new classificatory category of dwarf planet.

The possible dwarf planets Trujillo discovered are:

- Quaoar, co-discovered with Brown
- Sedna, co-discovered with Brown and Rabinowitz, possibly the first known inner Oort cloud object
- Orcus, co-discovered with Brown and Rabinowitz
- Eris, co-discovered with Brown and Rabinowitz – the only known TNO more massive than Pluto
- Haumea, discovery also claimed by the Sierra Nevada Observatory, Spain (also see José Luis Ortiz Moreno).
- Makemake, co-discovered with Brown and Rabinowitz in 2005, one of the first 5 official dwarf planets.

=== List of discovered minor planets ===
As of February 2026 Minor Planet Center credits Chad Trujillo with the discovery and co-discovery of 88 minor planets during 1996–2017.

(15874) 1996 TL66	October 9, 1996	list
(15875) 1996 TP66	October 11, 1996	list
(15883) 1997 CR_{29}	February 3, 1997	list
(19308) 1996 TO66	October 12, 1996	list
(20161) 1996 TR66	October 8, 1996	list
(24952) 1997 QJ4	August 28, 1997	list
(24978) 1998 HJ151	April 28, 1998	list
(26375) 1999 DE9	February 20, 1999	list
(33001) 1997 CU29	February 6, 1997	list
50000 Quaoar	June 4, 2002	list

(59358) 1999 CL_{158}	February 11, 1999	list
(60608) 2000 EE_{173}	March 3, 2000	list
65489 Ceto	March 22, 2003	list
66652 Borasisi	September 8, 1999	list
79360 Sila-Nunam	February 3, 1997	list
(79969) 1999 CP_{133}	February 11, 1999	list
(79978) 1999 CC_{158}	February 15, 1999	list
(79983) 1999 DF9	February 20, 1999	list
(84719) 2002 VR128	November 3, 2002	list
90377 Sedna	November 14, 2003	list

90482 Orcus	February 17, 2004	list
(91554) 1999 RZ_{215}	September 8, 1999	list
(118228) 1996 TQ66	October 8, 1996	list
(119951) 2002 KX14	May 17, 2002	list
(120178) 2003 OP32	July 26, 2003	list
(120348) 2004 TY364	October 3, 2004	list
(126154) 2001 YH140	December 18, 2001	list
(126155) 2001 YJ140	December 20, 2001	list
(129746) 1999 CE_{119}	February 10, 1999	list
(134568) 1999 RH_{215}	September 7, 1999	list

136199 Eris	October 21, 2003	list
136472 Makemake	March 31, 2005	list
(137294) 1999 RE_{215}	September 7, 1999	list
(137295) 1999 RB_{216}	September 8, 1999	list
(148112) 1999 RA_{216}	September 8, 1999	list
(168700) 2000 GE_{147}	April 2, 2000	list
(175113) 2004 PF115	August 7, 2004	list
(181867) 1999 CV_{118}	February 10, 1999	list
(181868) 1999 CG_{119}	February 11, 1999	list
(181871) 1999 CO_{153}	February 12, 1999	list

(181902) 1999 RD215	September 6, 1999	list
208996 Achlys	January 13, 2003	list
(250112) 2002 KY_{14}	May 19, 2002	list
(307251) 2002 KW_{14}	May 17, 2002	list
307261 Mani	June 18, 2002	list
341520 Mors-Somnus	October 14, 2007	list
(385201) 1999 RN_{215}	September 7, 1999	list
385571 Otrera	October 16, 2004	list
385695 Clete	October 8, 2005	list
(415720) 1999 RU_{215}	September 7, 1999	list

(469306) 1999 CD158	February 10, 1999	list
471143 Dziewanna	March 13, 2010	list
(471165) 2010 HE_{79}	May 7, 2002	list
(471921) 2013 FC_{28}	March 17, 2013	list
(472231) 2014 FU_{71}	March 28, 2014	list
(472232) 2014 FW_{71}	March 27, 2014	list
(503858) 1998 HQ_{151}	April 28, 1998	list
(508792) 2000 FX_{53}	March 31, 2000	list
(523597) 2002 QX_{47}	August 26, 2002	list
(523601) 2003 UY_{413}	October 19, 2003	list

(523671) 2013 FZ27	March 16, 2013	list
(523672) 2013 FJ_{28}	March 16, 2013	list
(523693) 2014 FT_{71}	March 24, 2014	list
(523899) 1997 CV_{29}	February 6, 1997	list
(523983) 1999 RY_{214}	September 6, 1999	list
532037 Chiminigagua	March 17, 2013	list
(532038) 2013 FB_{28}	March 17, 2013	list
(535028) 2014 WA_{510}	March 17, 2015	list
541132 Leleakuhonua	October 13, 2015	list
(560552) 2015 GO_{50}	April 13, 2015	list

(578834) 2014 GF_{54}	May 8, 2013	list
(612048) 1996 TS_{66}	October 12, 1996	list
(612049) 1997 CT_{29}	February 2, 1997	list
(612060) 1998 HH_{151}	April 28, 1998	list
(612084) 1999 CF_{119}	February 11, 1999	list
(612085) 1999 CL_{119}	February 11, 1999	list
(612086) 1999 CX_{131}	February 11, 1999	list
(612087) 1999 CU_{153}	February 12, 1999	list
(612158) 2000 FV_{53}	March 31, 2000	list
(613100) 2005 TN74	October 8, 2005	list

(669535) 2012 XR_{157}	December 11, 2012	list
(671087) 2014 FY_{71}	March 28, 2014	list
(678191) 2017 OF69	July 26, 2017	list
(689335) 2013 FL_{28}	March 16, 2013	list
(748122) 2013 FN_{28}	March 16, 2013	list
(767254) 2014 SJ_{378}	September 21, 2014	list
(831323) 2009 ME_{10}	June 27, 2009	list
(878973) 2013 FO_{28}	March 16, 2013	list

=== Satellites and uncredited discoveries ===
Object	Discovery date	Type	Credit went to..
Haumea	December 28, 2004	DP	
55565 Aya	January 10, 2002	TNO	The Palomar Observatory team with Michael Brown
2012 VP113	November 5, 2012	TNO	no official discoverers for unnumbered objects; candidate: S. S. Sheppard
(136108) Haumea I Hiʻiaka	January 26, 2005	Satellite	Michael Brown and the adaptive-optics team, D. L. Rabinowitz
(136108) Haumea II Namaka	July 30, 2005	Satellite	Michael Brown and the adaptive-optics team
(136199) Eris I Dysnomia	September 10, 2005	Satellite	Michael Brown and the adaptive-optics team: M. A. van Dam, A. H. Bouchez, D. Le Mignant, R. D. Campbell, J. C. Y. Chin, A. Conrad, S. K. Hartman, E. M. Johansson, R. E. Lafon, D. L. Rabinowitz, P. J. Stomski Jr., D. M. Summers, and P. L. Wizinowich

== Honors and awards ==
The main-belt asteroid 12101 Trujillo is named for him.

In 2006 he was named one of the Science Spectrum Magazine Trailblazer, top minority in science.
