= List of geological features on Rhea =

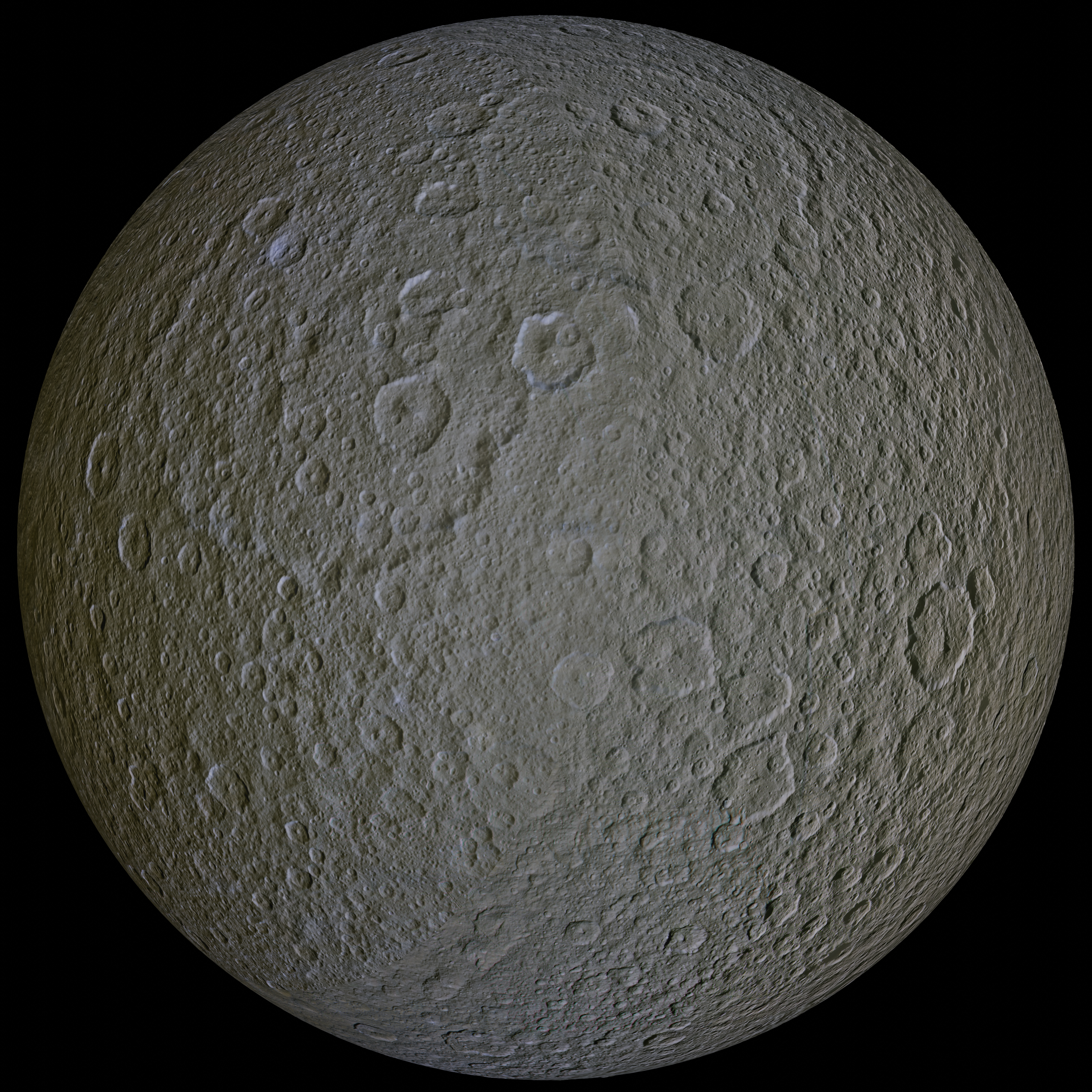
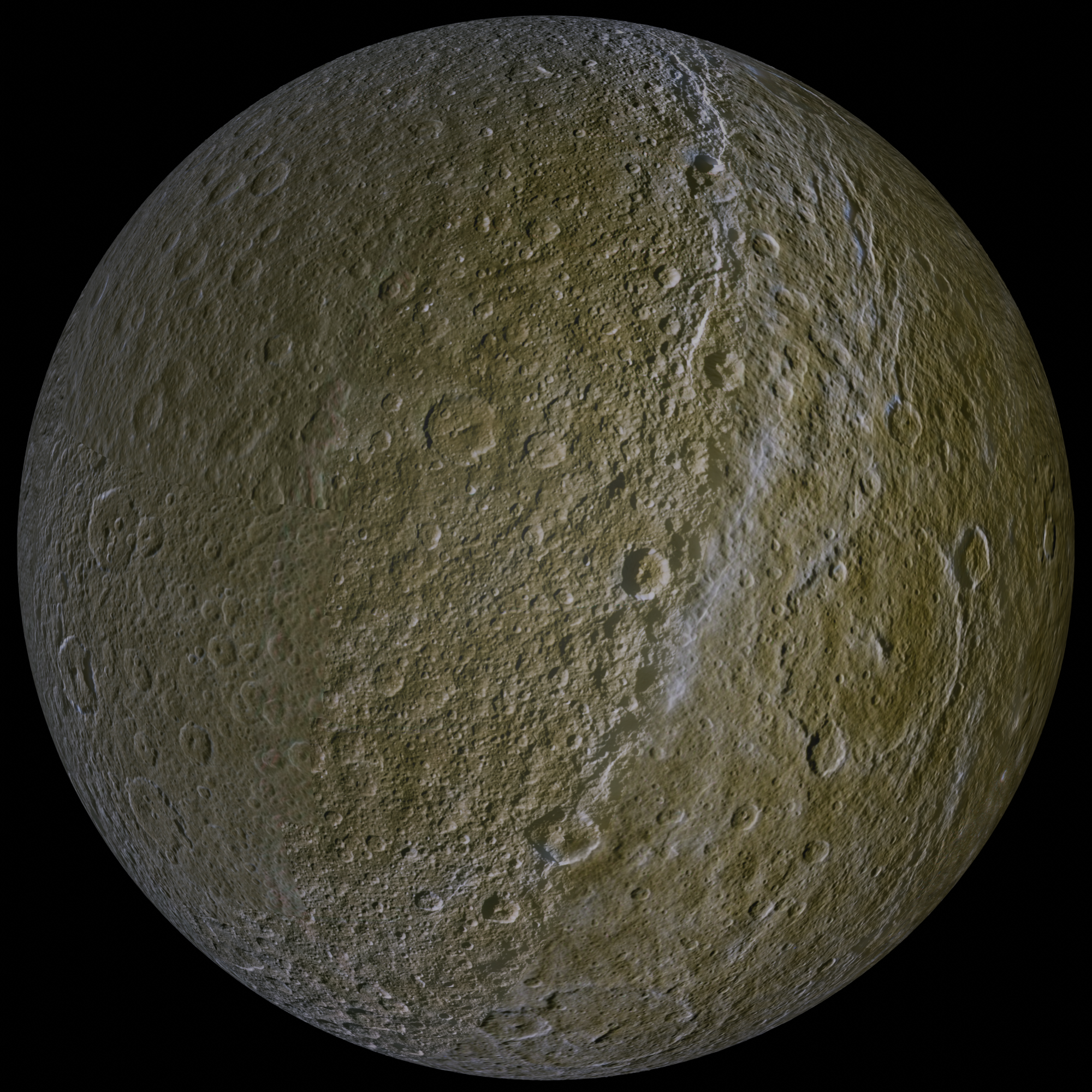

This is a list of named geological features on Rhea, the second largest moon of Saturn. Planetary features are approved by the International Astronomical Union's (IAU) Working Group for Planetary System Nomenclature (WGPSN).

== Catenae ==
A catena /kəˈtiːnə/ is a crater chain.

Name	Coordinates	Diameter (km)	Approval Date	Named After	Notes	Ref
Koykamou Catena	70°S 244°W	110	6 August 2010	Koykamou, a mountain in Nganasan mythology	—	WGPSN
Mouru Catena	48.5°N 343.5°W	80	6 August 2010	Merv, holy land in Persian mythology	—	WGPSN
Onokoro Catenae	44.7°S 328.5°W	240	6 August 2010	Onokoro, mythical island in Japanese mythology	—	WGPSN
Puchou Catenae	32°N 87°W	620	6 August 2010	Pu Chou Mountain in Chinese mythology	Formerly classified as a chasma	WGPSN
Thebeksan Catena	39.5°S 174°W	220	6 August 2010	Thebeksan, holy mountain in Korean mythology	—	WGPSN
Wungaran Catenae	22.5°N 79°W	350	6 August 2010	Wungaran, sacred place in Kakadu, Australia	—	WGPSN

== Chasmata ==
Rhean chasms are called chasmata. They are named after sacred places in world mythologies.

Name	Coordinates	Diameter (km)	Approval Date	Named After	Notes	Ref
Avaiki Chasmata	25°N 279°W	580	6 August 2010	Avaiki, the underworld in Cook Islands mythology	-	WGPSN
Galunlati Chasmata	38°N 290°W	740	6 August 2010	ᎦᎸᎳᏗ galvladi (galvv́ládii) "the above": the land above the sky in Cherokee mythology	-	WGPSN
Kun Lun Chasma	46°N 307.5°W	0	1982	Mountain dwelling place of the immortals in Chinese mythology	was reclassified as a linea in 2010 (see below)	WGPSN
Pu Chou Chasma	26.1°N 95.3°W	0	1982	Mountain attacked by Kung Chung in Chinese mythology	was reclassified as a catena in 2010 (see above)	WGPSN
Pulag Chasma	33°S 266.5°W	190	6 August 2010	Pulag, sacred mountain in Igorot mythology	-	WGPSN
Vaupas Chasma	35°S 260°W	280	6 August 2010	Vaupas, a river in the mythology of the Cuebo of Colombia, where the Cubeo people are said to have been created.	It is near Pulag Chasma.	WGPSN
Yamsi Chasmata	28°S 280.5°W	380	6 August 2010	Yamsi, lodge of the North Wind in Klamath mythology	-	WGPSN

== Craters ==
Rhean craters are named after figures from the mythologies of mostly non-European cultures. As of 2017, there are 128 named craters.

Crater	Coordinate	Named after
Aananin	34.9°N 339.9°W	Aananin (Korean)
Abassi	21.3°S 146.5°W	Abassi (Efik)
Adjua	40.2°N 118.9°W	Adjua (Ulch people of Siberia)
Agunua	63.3°N 66.2°W	Agunua (Solomon Islands)
Ameta	53.3°N 21.9°W	Ameta (Seram, Indonesia)
Anguta	25.7°N 190.0°W	Anguta (Inuit)
Arunaka	15.3°S 22.1°W	Arunaka (Incan)
Atum	47.1°S 1.1°W	Atum (Egyptian)
Awonawilona	37.3°S 150.3°W	Awonawilona (Zuni)
Bulagat	38.2°S 15.2°W	Bulagat (Buryat people of Siberia)
Bumba	63.1°N 50.4°W	Bumba (Bushongo people of the Congo)
Burkhan	66.8°N 310.6°W	Burkhan (Buryat people of Siberia)
Chingaso	17.1°S 106.0°W	Chingaso (Jivaro)
Con	25.8°S 12.7°W	Kon (Incan)
Dangun	7.2°N 208.0°W	Dangun (Korean)
Djuli	31.2°S 46.7°W	Djuli (Neghidahan people of Ukraine)
Dohitt	18.0°S 74.1°W	Dohitt (Mosetene, people of north Bolivia)
Ellyay	71.4°N 91.8°W	Ellyay (Yakut people of Siberia)
Faro	45.3°N 114.0°W	Faro (Mandé peoples of West Africa)
Fatu	7.7°N 176.1°W	Fatu (Samoan)
Gborogboro	12.7°S 162.2°W	Gborogboro (Lugbara)
Gmerti	52.0°S 192.6°W	Gmerti (Georgian)
Gucumatz	37.0°N 175.8°W	Gukumatz (Maya)
Haik	36.6°S 29.3°W	Haik (Armenian)
Haoso	8.3°N 12.5°W	Haoso (Manchuria)
Heller	10.1°N 315.1°W	Heller (Auracanin)
Huracan	53.2°N 188.5°W	Huracan (Kiche)
Imberombera	33.3°S 216.7°W	Imberombera (Kakadu)
Inktomi	14.1°S 112.1°W	Iktomi (Lakota)
Inmar	2.3°S 301.6°W	Inmar (Udmurtian)
Iraca	39.4°N 112.1°W	Iraca (Incan)
Izanagi	49.4°S 310.2°W	Izanagi (Japanese)
Izanami	46.3°S 313.4°W	Izanami (Japanese)
Jumo	52.8°N 66.5°W	Jumo (Mari people of the Volga)
Karora	5.9°N 20.1°W	Karora (Aranda people of Australia)
Khado	41.6°N 359.1°W	Khado (Nganasan)
Kiho	11.1°S 358.7°W	Kiho (Polynesian)
Kuksu	25.3°N 288.7°W	Kuksu (Pomo)
Kuma	10.0°N 277.2°W	Kuma (Yaruro)
Kumpara	9.6°N 327.1°W	Kumpara (Jivaro people of Ecuador)
Leza	21.8°S 309.2°W	Leza (Tongan)
Lowa	40.9°N 16.6°W	Lowa (Marshall Islands)
Luli	46.5°N 243.1°W	Luli (Mansi)
Madumda	36.9°S 64.8°W	Madumda (Pomo)
Maheo	31.6°N 281.7°W	Maheo (Cheyenne)
Malunga	65.1°N 56.2°W	Malunga (Bantu)
Mamaldi	14°N 184°W	Mamaldi (Nanai) (Tungusic people of the Amur River area)
Manoid	29.5°N 8.5°W	Manoid (Negrito people of the Malay Peninsula)
Melo	53.2°S 7.1°W	Melo (Minyong people of India)
Mubai	55.8°N 20.2°W	Mubai (Tibetan)
Napi	26.9°N 174.8°W	Napi (Blackfoot)
Nishanu	9.0°S 129.0°W	Nishanu (Arikara)
Num	24.0°N 92.7°W	Num (Samoyed)
Nzame	9.0°N 24.9°W	Nzame (Fang)
Obatala	1.1°S 269.7°W	Obatala (Yoruba)
Olorun	24.7°N 155.4°W	Olorun (Yoruba)
Ormazd	52.5°N 58.5°W	Ormazd (Zoroastrian)
Pachacamac	23.4°S 83.7°W	Pachacamac (Inca)
Pan Ku	65.7°N 107.7°W	Pan Ku (Hmong)
Pedn	46.0°N 351.7°W	Pedn (Negrito people of the Malay Peninsula)
Pokoh	71.7°S 326.4°W	Pokoh (Pallawonaps)
Pouliuli	16.9°S 284.4°W	Pouliuli (Hawaiian)
Powehiwehi	8.2°S 280.4°W	Powehiwehi (Hawaiian)
Puntan	33.9°N 292.4°W	Puntan (Chamorro)
Qat	23.8°S 351.6°W	Qat (New Hebrides)
Samni	47.7°S 90.7°W	Samni (Kachins)
Seveki	12.9°N 164.7°W	Seveki (Evenki)
Shedi	53.5°S 346.8°W	Shedi (Minyong)
Sholmo	12.0°N 346.4°W	Sholmo (Buryat people of Siberia)
Taaroa	16.5°N 95.5°W	Ta'aroa (Hawaiian)
Tane	12.5°S 57.4°W	Tāne (Māori)
Tawa	17.9°N 175.2°W	Tawa (Hopi)
Thunupa	45.6°N 21.3°W	Thunpa (Incan)
Tika	25.1°N 84.1°W	Tika (Abkhazia)
Tirawa	34.2°N 151.7°W	Tirawa (Pawnee)
Tore	0.0°N 335.6°W	Tore (Pygmy people of Africa)
Torom	68.1°S 343.5°W	Torom (Ostiak people of Siberia)
Tsuki-Yomi	35.0°N 43.8°W	Tsukuyomi-no-Mikoto (Japanese)
Tulpar	56.1°N 158.6°W	Tulpar (Turkic)
Tuwale	78.0°S 242.4°W	Tuwale (Ceram)
Uku	78.7°N 95.5°W	Uku (Estonian)
Wakonda	48.6°N 269.7°W	Wakonda (Sioux)
Wende	56.3°S 226.4°W	Wende (Mossi)
Whanin	66.9°N 115.0°W	Hwanin (Korean)
Wuraka	25.1°N 4.0°W	Wuraka (Kakadu people of Australia)
Woyengi	13.7°N 294.5°W	Woyengi (Ijaw)
Wulbari	67.0°N 88.9°W	Wulbari (Krachi)
Xamba	2.1°N 349.7°W	Xamba (unidentified, purportedly "Bushman")
Xowalaci	2.4°N 56.3°W	Xowalaci (Joshua)
Xu	55.0°N 71.9°W	!Xu (various San peoples, a loanword to translate "Lord" in the Bible)
Yu-Ti	50.1°N 81.5°W	Yu-Ti (Chinese), i.e. the Jade Emperor
Zicum	50.9°S 111.2°W	Zicum (Babylonian)

back to top

== Fossae ==
A fossa is a long, narrow depression.

Name	Coordinates	Diameter (km)	Approval Date	Named After	Ref
Harahvaiti Fossa	36°S 171°W	190	6 August 2010	Beautiful land created by Persian god Ahura Mazda; modern Kandahar, Afghanistan	WGPSN
Parun Fossa	46.5°S 152°W	120	6 August 2010	Parun River, Nuristan (NE Afghanistan), in which the mother goddess Disani gave birth to Bagisht, the creator of people	WGPSN

== Lineae ==
A linea is a long marking on a planet or moon's surface.

Name	Coordinates	Diameter (km)	Approval Date	Named After	Notes	Ref
Kirinyaga Linea	1.8°S 128.8°W	400	17 June 2010	Mount Kenya (Kirinyaga), a holy mountain in Kikuyu mythology.	—	WGPSN
Kunlun Linea	45°N 308°W	180	6 August 2010	Kunlun Mountains, home of the gods in Chinese mythology	Formerly classified as a chasma	WGPSN

== See also ==
- List of craters in the Solar System
- List of quadrangles on Rhea
