= Bumba =

Bumba can refer to:

== Geography ==
- Bumba, Democratic Republic of the Congo, a town on the Congo River
- Bumba, a crater on Rhea
- Bumba, mythical land of the Kalmyk people in the Epic of Jangar

== People ==
- Bumba Da, nickname of Bengali film actor Prasenjit Chatterjee
- Claudiu Bumba, a Romanian football player

== Other ==
- Bumba (god), or Mbombo, the supreme deity of the Bushongo people
- Bumba (TV series), a children's television series created by Studio 100
- Bumba (spider), a genus of spiders in the subfamily Theraphosinae
- Bumba Meu Boi, a Brazilian folk theatrical tradition
- "Bumba", a song from Soulfly on their self-titled debut album
