= Inktomi (disambiguation) =

Inktomi was a California-based online company.

Inktomi may also refer to:

- Inktomi (crater), a crater on Saturn's moon Rhea
- an alternate spelling of Iktomi, Lakota spider-trickster god
