= Tirawa =

Tirawa may refer to:

- Tirawa (god) (also Atius Tirawa) was the creator god of the Pawnee people
- Tirawa (crater), a large impact basin on Saturn's moon Rhea
