= Pulag Chasma =

Cliff on Rhea, a moon of Saturn

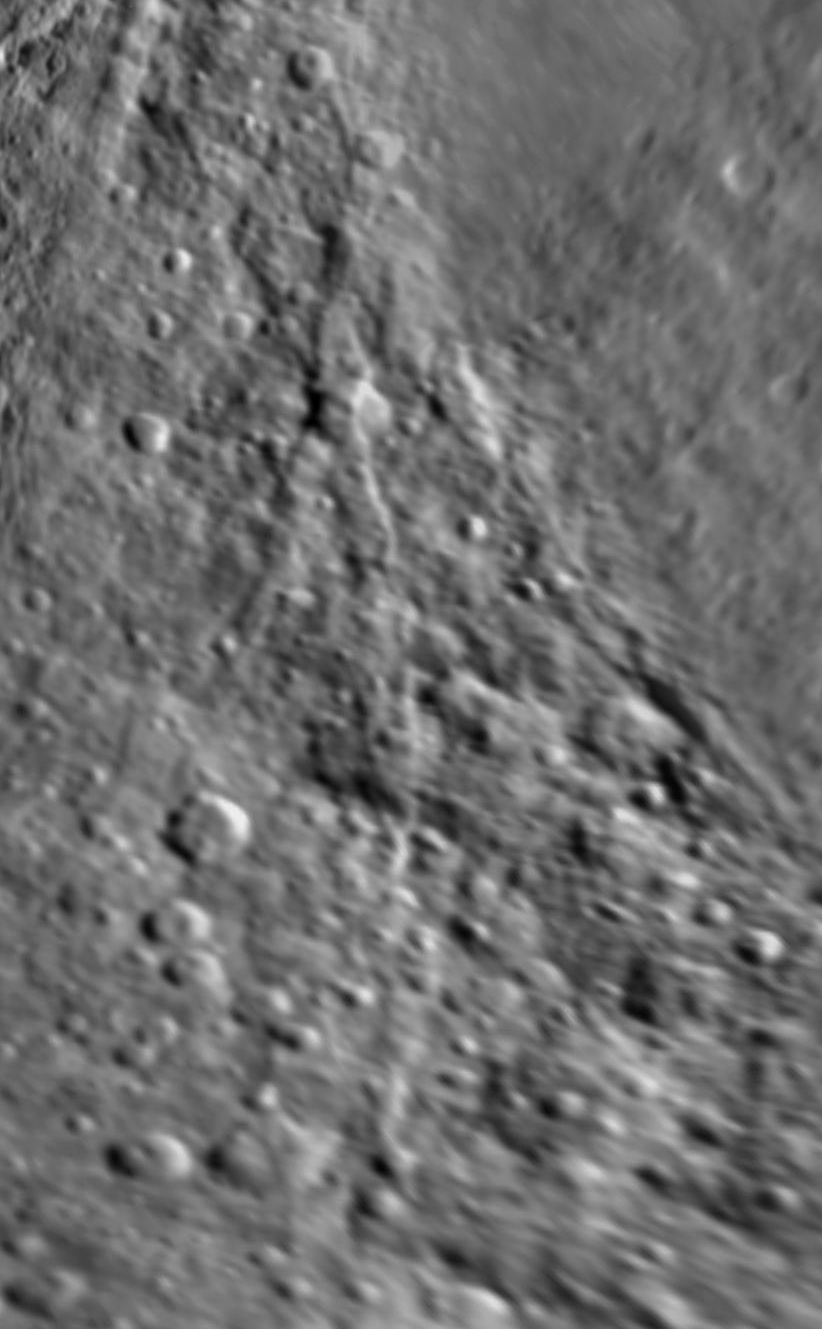
- A Mercator projection image of Pulag Chasma.
- Feature type: Chasma
- Coordinates: 33°00′S 266°30′W
- Diameter: 190 kilometres (120 mi)
- Eponym: Mount Pulag

Pulag Chasma is a deep cliff or graben on Rhea, the second largest moon of planet Saturn.

== Naming ==
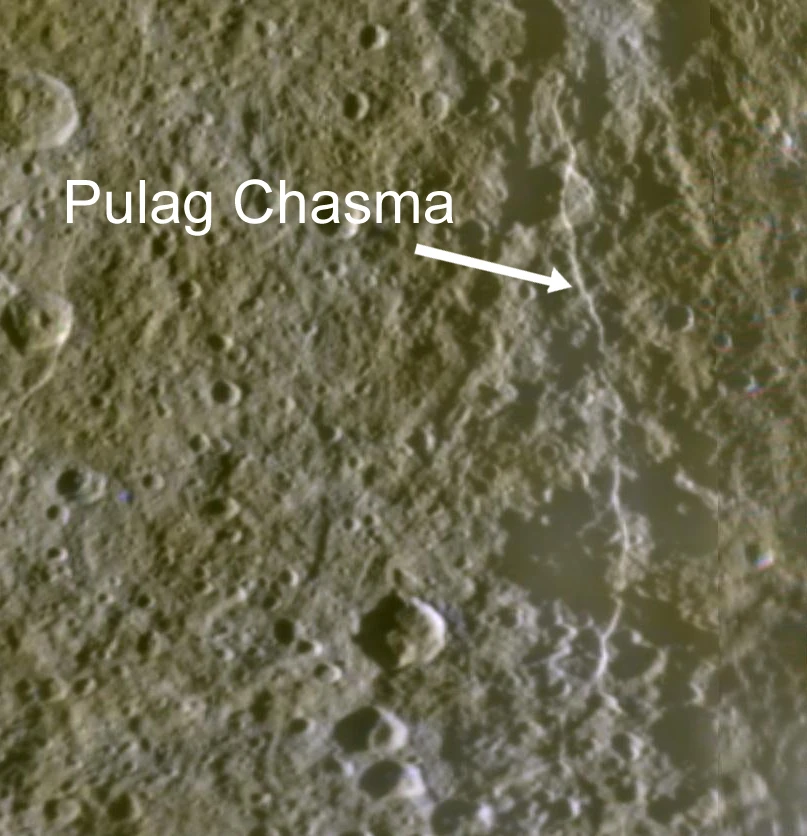
An enhanced color image of Pulag Chasma.

Pulag Chasma is named after a mountain in the Philippines called Mount Pulag, which is located between the provinces of Benguet and Ifugao. It is considered a sacred mountain by the tribal Igorot people and it is the highest mountain in the island of Luzon.

Pulag Chasma was chosen by the International Astronomical Union (IAU) in line with the convention that surface features should be named after gods, goddesses and sacred places from non-European legends and mythologies.

The IAU approved the named for Pulag Chasma in August 2010.

== Location ==
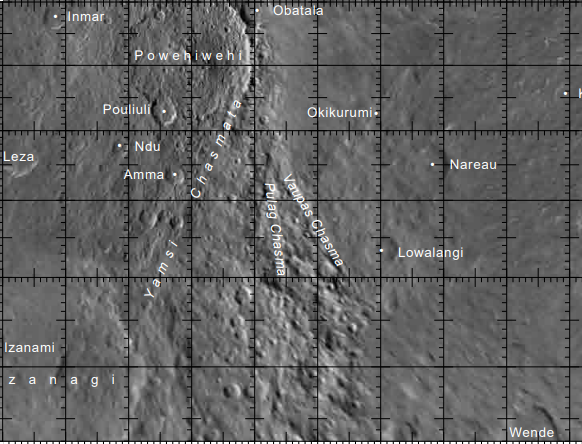
A map of the area around Pulag Chasma.

Pulag Chasma is located in the southern hemisphere of Rhea. It is surrounded by many other chasms, such as Yamsi Chasmata to the west and Vaupas Chasma to the east.

Because Rhea orbits Saturn and rotates synchronously on its axis, one hemisphere of the moon always faces its primary planet, while the opposite side never does. Pulag Chasma is situated on Rhea's trailing hemisphere, the side that faces opposite the direction of the moon's motion as it orbits the planet. (Note: For moons with synchronous rotation, such as Rhea, 0° longitude refers to the part of the surface that always faces its primary planet. Regions between 180°W, 270°W, and 360° (or 0°) W longitude belong to the moon's trailing side.)

== Discovery ==
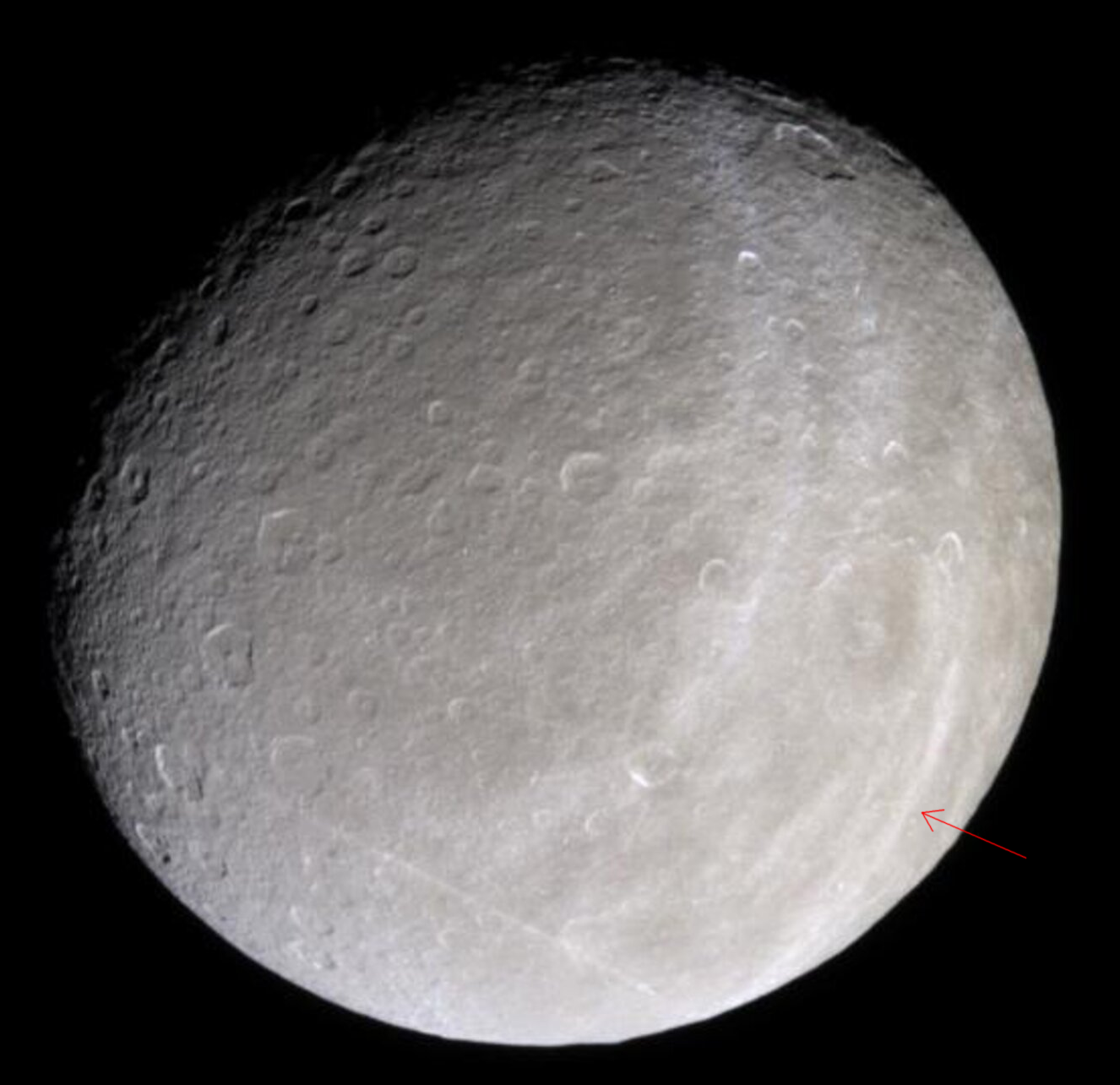
An image of Rhea, showing Pulag Chasma near the limb of the moon (pointed to by the red arrow). This image was taken by the Cassini space probe in January 2005.

Pulag Chasma was discovered through images taken by the two space probes Voyager 1 and Voyager 2, which visited Saturn and Rhea in 1980 and 1981 respectively. Pulag Chasma appeared as a bright, curved feature on Rhea's surface that scientists described as a “wispy terrain.”

However, at that time, the resolution of the images of Pulag Chasma were not sufficient to determine its true nature. As a result, scientists long debated whether it consisted merely of deposits of bright material or of cliffs with exposed surfaces made of reflective material such as clean water ice.

The origin of the “wispy terrain” features was mysterious because, at the time, the only known facts were that the material had a high albedo and was thin enough not to obscure the underlying surface features. One hypothesis suggested that shortly after Rhea formed, it was geologically active, and processes such as cryovolcanism resurfaced large portions of its surface. In this scenario, streaks were formed from eruptions along surface fractures, with material falling back down as snow or ash. Eventually, after internal activity and resurfacing ceased, impact cratering continued —especially on the leading hemisphere—erasing the streak patterns in that region.

When the Cassini–Huygens spacecraft arrived at the Saturnian system in July 2004, it obtained clearer images of Pulag Chasma compared to the earlier Voyager 1 and Voyager 2. Through Cassini's higher-resolution images, scientists concluded that Pulag Chasma is an actual chasm and not merely bright deposits on the surface of Rhea.

== Geology ==
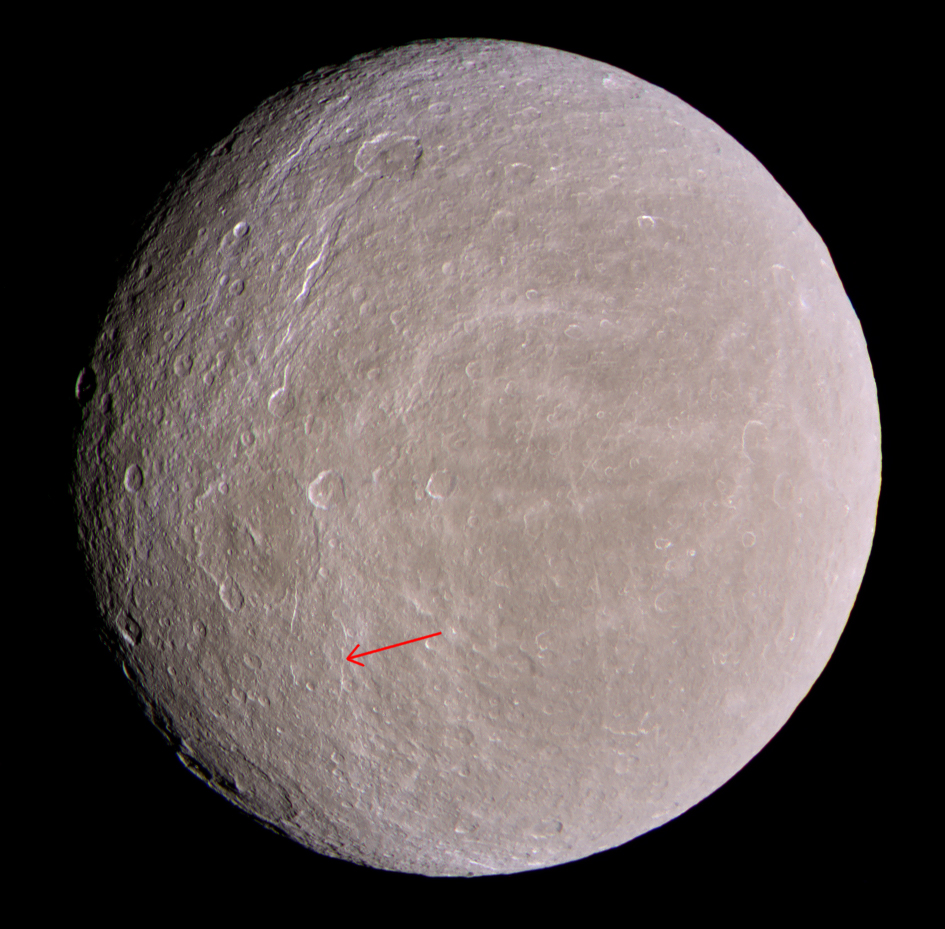
An image of Rhea's trailing hemisphere. Pulag Chasma is indicated by a red arrow. This image was taken by the Cassini spacecraft in November 2009.

Pulag Chasma is a chasm on the icy moon Rhea. According to scientific investigations, water ice-rich moons like Rhea develop chasms when their frozen surfaces fracture.

Because water expands when it freezes, the water inside Rhea also expanded as it cooled and froze, pushing upward against the moon's rigid outer shell and causing fractures to appear — similar to how bottles filled with water can crack when the water freezes inside a refrigerator.

Rhea's sister moons, such as Dione and Tethys, also have large, long fractures, which are believed to have been caused by the same process of expanding, solidifying ice. The walls of these chasms appear bright because darker material falls away from them, exposing fresh, bright water ice underneath.

The area surrounding Pulag Chasma is noticeably darker compared to the surface of Rhea's opposite hemisphere, which is whiter and brighter. Because Pulag Chasma itself is bright while its surroundings are relatively dark, the brightness of the chasm walls in this region is clearly visible.
