= Bushongo religion =

Traditional religion of the Bushongo people

The Bushongo are an ethnic group from the Congo River and surrounding areas. The creator god (or chembe) in Bushongo religion is called Bumba. Other names for him include M'Bombo and M'Bomba. He is said to have originally existed alone in darkness, in a universe consisting of nothing but primordial water. M'Bombo was said to appear like a gigantic man in form and white in colour. The creation took place when he vomited the sun, moon, animals and then humanity.

== Modern influence ==
David Adams Leeming in The World of Myth, states:

"The dominant theme in this myth is that of creation out of the male principle. Bumba [M'Bombo]'s vomiting reminds us of the Egyptian High God's creation by spitting and seed spilling. The absence of the female principle here suggests a patrilineal culture. The fact that Bumba [M'Bombo] is white suggests that this is a late myth, affected, like so much African mythology, by the presence of the white race in colonial Africa."

== Cosmology ==
According to the Bushongo creation myth, the only thing that existed in the world originally was a god named M'Bombo. Having become ill, M'Bombo vomited: out the sun, the moon, the stars, various animals and Tsetse the lightning. Finally, M'Bombo vomited out humans. The animals that M'Bombo had vomited out earlier created other animals.

The three sons of M'Bombo attempted to finish the creation of the world. The first, Nyonye Ngana, made white ants but was not equal to the task and died as a result. The ants, however, thankful for life, went searching for black earth and covered the barren sands to bury and honour their creator. Chonganda, the second son, brought forth a plant from which all other plants in the world are descended. The third son, Chedi Bumba, only succeeded in creating the bird called the kite.

Tsetse the lightning, proved to be a trouble-maker. Consequently, M'Bombo chased her into the sky, leaving mankind without fire until he later showed people how to draw fire out of trees.

When the work of creation was completed, M'Bombo walked through the villages and said to the people, "Behold these wonders, they belong to you"
