= Uku, Estonia =

Village in Estonia

Coordinates: 59°23′N 26°01′E

Uku
- Village
- Interactive map of Uku
- Country: Estonia
- County: Lääne-Viru County
- Parish: Kadrina Parish
- Time zone: UTC+2 (EET)
  - Summer (DST): UTC+3 (EEST)

Uku is a village in Kadrina Parish, Lääne-Viru County, in northeastern Estonia. It lies on the left bank of the Loobu River.
