= Tirawa (crater) =

Crater on Rhea

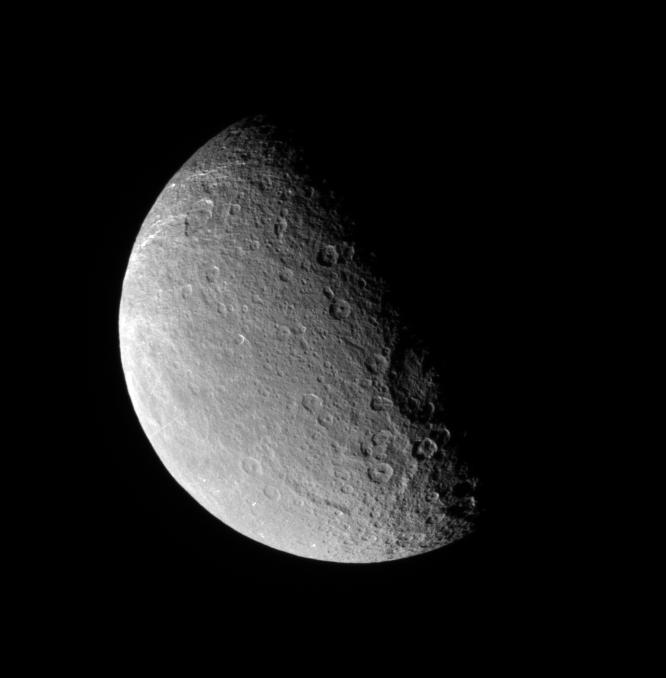
- This Cassini image of Rhea shows Tirawa straddling Rhea's terminator
- Feature type: Peak-ring impact basin
- Location: Rhea
- Coordinates: 34°12′N 151°42′W
- Diameter: c. 350 km (220 mi)
- Depth: c. 6 km (3.7 mi)
- Age: c. 4 billion years
- Discoverer: Voyager 1 in 1980
- Eponym: Tirawa

Tirawa is the largest impact basin on Saturn's moon Rhea. It was glimpsed by Voyager 1 during its flyby of the moon and later photographed in greater detail by the Cassini orbiter. Tirawa is elongated in shape and overlaps Mamaldi, a larger and more degraded basin to its southwest.

== Observation and naming ==
Tirawa was first observed by Voyager 1 as it captured imagery of Rhea during its flyby of the Saturn system on 13 November 1980. Though poorly imaged from the Voyager 1 encounter, Tirawa was identified as an impact structure by 1983 and provisionally named Basin A. Tirawa was later named after the creator deity in Pawnee mythology, Tirawa; the name was officially approved by the International Astronomical Union (IAU) in 1987. Tirawa was later observed in greater detail by the Cassini spacecraft in multiple flybys of Rhea throughout the late 2000s and the 2010s.

== Geology ==
With a rough diameter of 350 kilometers, Tirawa is the largest identified impact crater on Rhea. Tirawa is a peak-ring impact basin, with a degraded inner ring of ridges and plateaus roughly 180 kilometers across. Individual ridges in the peak ring are typically around 50 kilometers across at their base and rise 1–3 kilometers above the basin floor. Tirawa is slightly elongated into an ellipsoid, with an a/b ratio of ~0.9, indicating that it was created in a low-angle oblique impact. Based on the crater counting method, Tirawa is about 4 billion years old.

The impact event that created Tirawa ejected massive amounts of material, with up to ~15–20% of the material ejected at speeds exceeding Rhea's escape velocity. Any such impact ejecta would've escaped Rhea's influence entirely, directly orbiting Saturn. Some of the ejecta later impacted Rhea, likely accounting for a large amount of Rhea's small craters.

== See also ==
- Odysseus – An impact basin on Tethys that is analogous to Tirawa in size and structure
