= Rhea (moon) =

Second-largest moon of Saturn

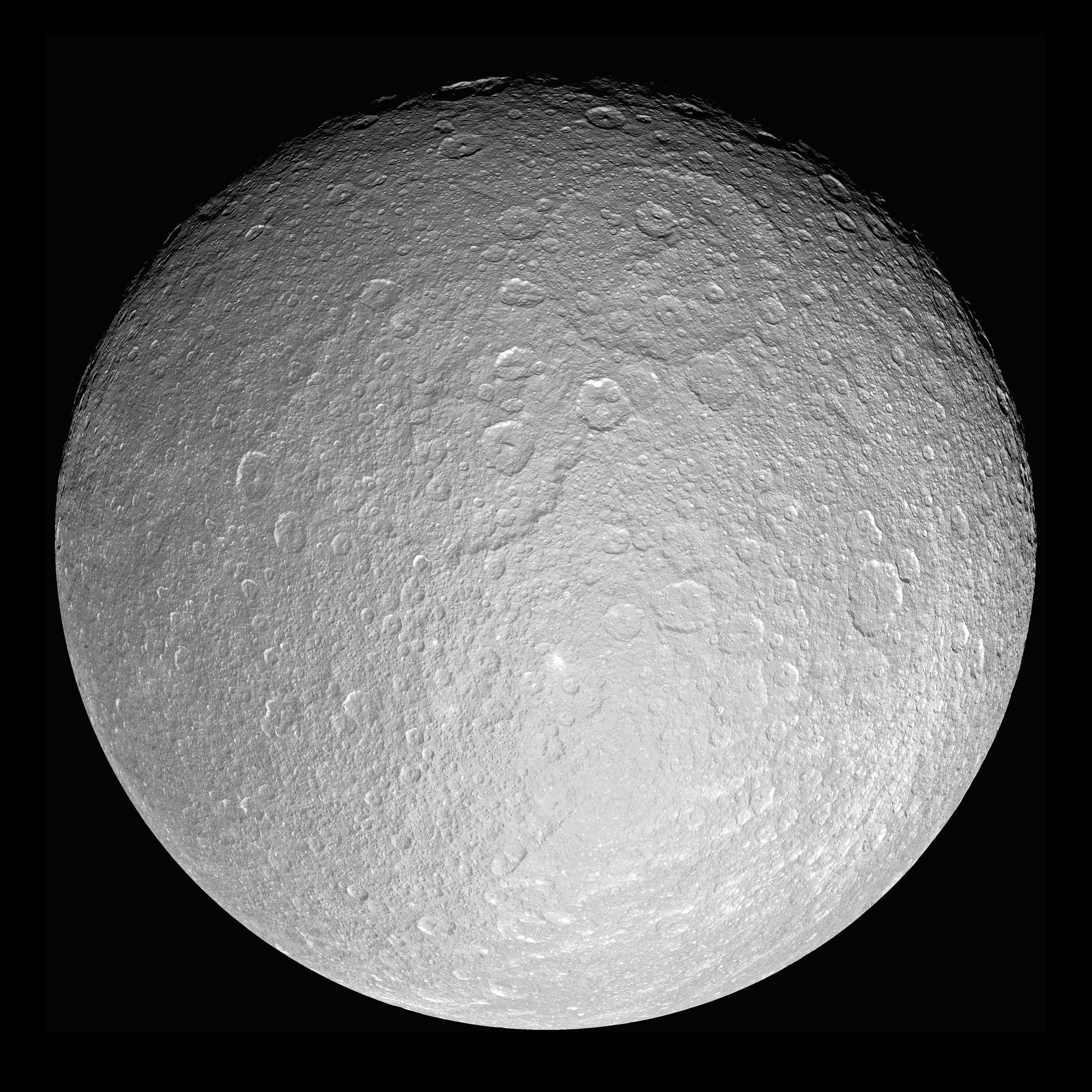
- Mosaic of Rhea, assembled from Cassini imagery taken on 26 November 2005

Discovery
- Discovered by: G. D. Cassini
- Discovery date: December 23, 1672

Designations
- Designation: Saturn V
- Pronunciation: /ˈreɪ.ə/
- Named after: Ῥέᾱ Rheā
- Adjectives: Rhean /ˈreɪ.ən/

Orbital characteristics
- Periapsis: 526512 km
- Apoapsis: 527567 km
- Semi-major axis: 527040 km
- Eccentricity: 0.001
- Orbital period (sidereal): 4.518212 d
- Average orbital speed: 8.48 km/s (Note: Calculated on the basis of other parameters.)
- Inclination: 0.35°
- Satellite of: Saturn

Physical characteristics
- Dimensions: 1531.36 × 1527.20 × 1525.72 km (± 0.50 × 0.50 × 0.30 km)
- Mean diameter: 1528.09±0.26 km (Note: Calculated as the geometric mean of the three axes ($\sqrt[3]{a\cdot b\cdot c}$).)
- Surface area: 7335818 km^{2} (Note: The surface area can be estimated, given the radius, with the formula 4πr^{2})
- Mass: (2.3064854±0.0000522)×10^{21} kg (~3.9×10^{−4} Earths)
- Mean density: 1.2372±0.0029 g/cm^{3}
- Surface gravity: 0.26 m/s^{2} (Note: Surface area derived from the radius (r): $|4\pi r^2$.)
- Moment of inertia factor: 0.3911±0.0045 (disputed/unclear)
- Escape velocity: 0.635 km/s
- Synodic rotation period: 4.518212 d (synchronous)
- Axial tilt: 0°
- Albedo: 0.949±0.003 (geometric); 0.59±0.02 (bolometric Bond)
Surface temp.	min	mean	max
Kelvin	53 K		99 K
- Apparent magnitude: 10

Rhea (/ˈreɪ.ə/) is the second-largest natural satellite of Saturn and the ninth-largest moon in the Solar System, with a diameter of 1,528 kilometres (949 mi). Rhea is the smallest body in the Solar System that is confirmed to be in hydrostatic equilibrium. It has a nearly circular orbit around Saturn, but it is also tidally locked, like Saturn's other major moons. It rotates with the same period it revolves or orbits. Thus, one hemisphere always faces towards the planet.

The moon has a fairly low density, composed of roughly three-quarters ice and only one-quarter rock. The surface of Rhea is heavily cratered, with distinct leading and trailing hemispheres. Like the moon Dione, it has high-albedo ice cliffs that appear as bright wispy streaks visible from space. The surface temperature varies between −174 °C (−281.2 °F) and −220 °C (−364.0 °F).

Rhea was discovered in 1672 by Giovanni Domenico Cassini. Since then, it has been visited by both Voyager probes and was the subject of close targeted flybys by the Cassini orbiter in 2005, 2007, 2010, 2011, and once more in 2013.

== Discovery ==
Rhea was discovered by Giovanni Domenico Cassini on 23 December 1672, with a 10.4-metre (34 ft) telescope made by Giuseppe Campani. Cassini named the four moons he discovered (Tethys, Dione, Rhea, and Iapetus) Sidera Lodoicea (the stars of Louis) to honor King Louis XIV. Rhea was the second moon of Saturn that Cassini discovered, and the third moon discovered around Saturn overall.

== Name ==
Rhea is named after the Titan Rhea of Greek mythology, the mother of the first generation of Olympian gods and wife of Cronus, the Greek counterpart of the god Saturn. It is also designated Saturn V (being the fifth major moon going outward from the planet, after Mimas, Enceladus, Tethys, and Dione).

Astronomers fell into the habit of referring to them and Titan as Saturn I through Saturn V. Once Mimas and Enceladus were discovered, in 1789, the numbering scheme was extended to Saturn VII, and then to Saturn VIII with the discovery of Hyperion in 1848.

Rhea was not named until 1847, when John Herschel (son of William Herschel, discoverer of the planet Uranus and two other moons of Saturn, Mimas and Enceladus) suggested in Results of Astronomical Observations made at the Cape of Good Hope that the names of the Titans, sisters and brothers of Cronus (Saturn, in Roman mythology), be used.

Planetary moons other than Earth's were never given symbols in the astronomical literature. Denis Moskowitz, a software engineer who designed most of the dwarf planet symbols, proposed a Greek rho (the initial of Rhea) combined with the crook of the Saturn symbol as the symbol of Rhea. This symbol is not widely used.

== Orbit ==
The orbit of Rhea has very low eccentricity (0.001), meaning it is nearly circular. It has a low inclination of less than a degree, inclined by only 0.35° from Saturn's equatorial plane.

Rhea is tidally locked and rotates synchronously; that is, it rotates at the same speed it revolves (orbits), so one hemisphere is always facing towards Saturn. This is called the near pole. Equally, one hemisphere always faces forward, relative to the direction of movement; this is called the leading hemisphere; the other side is the trailing hemisphere, which faces backwards relative to the moon's motion.

== Physical characteristics ==
=== Size, mass, and internal structure ===
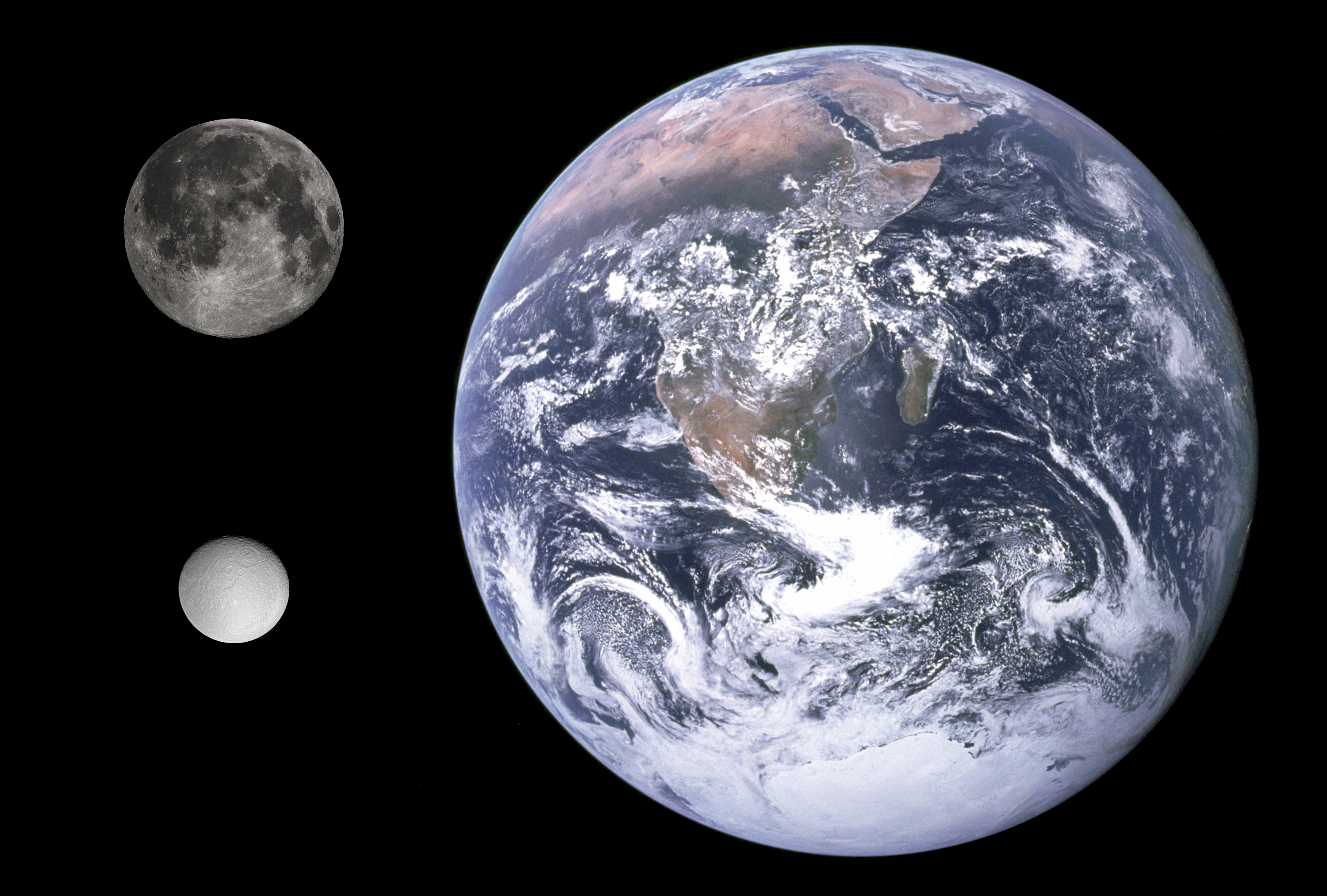
Size comparison of Earth (right), the Moon (left top), and Rhea (left down)

Rhea is the second largest moon of Saturn, but with a mean diameter of 1,528 kilometers (949 miles) it is less than a third the radius of Saturn's largest moon, Titan. Rhea is an icy body with a density of about 1.236 g/cm^{3}. This low density indicates that it is made of ~25% rock (density ~3.25 g/cm^{3}) and ~75% water ice (density ~0.93 g/cm^{3}). A layer of Ice II (a high-pressure and extra-low temperature form of ice) is believed, based on the moon's temperature profile, to start around 350 to 450 kilometres (220 to 280 mi) beneath the surface. Although Rhea is the ninth-largest moon in the Solar System, it is only the tenth-most massive. Indeed, Oberon, the second-largest moon of Uranus, has almost the same size, but is significantly denser than Rhea (1.63 vs 1.24) and thus more massive, although Rhea is slightly larger by volume. (Note: The moons more massive than Rhea are: the Moon, the four Galilean moons, Titan, Triton, Titania, and Oberon. Oberon, Uranus's second-largest moon, has a radius that is ~0.4% smaller than Rhea's, but a density that is ~26% greater. See JPLSSD.) The surface area of the moon can be estimated at 7,330,000 square kilometres (2,830,000 mi^{2}), about the size of Australia (7,688,287 km^{2}).

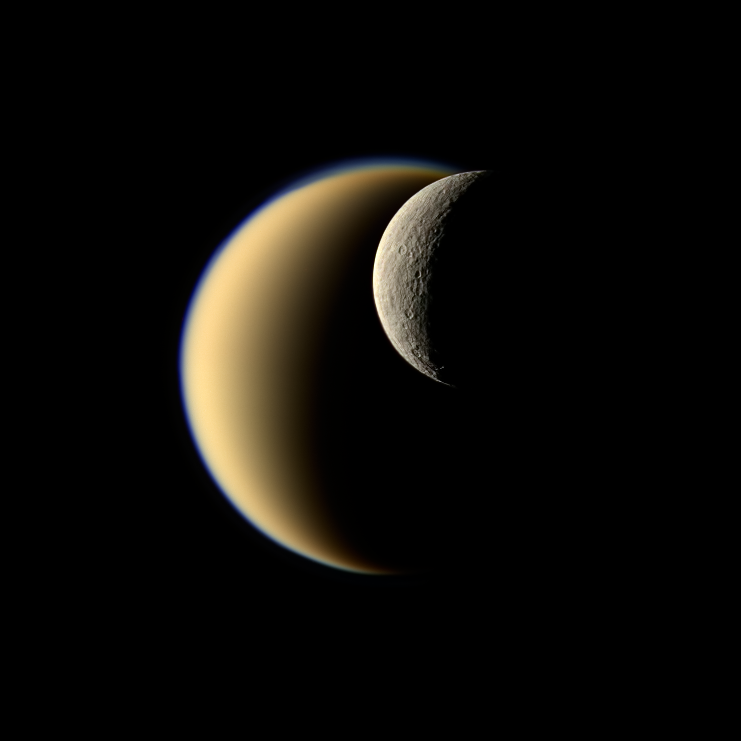
Image containing Rhea (foreground) and Titan (background), captured by Cassini. Relative sizes are not to scale.

Before the Cassini–Huygens mission, it was assumed that Rhea had a rocky core. However, measurements taken during a close flyby by the Cassini orbiter in 2005 cast this into doubt. In a paper published in 2007 it was claimed that the axial dimensionless moment of inertia coefficient was 0.4. (Note: More precisely, 0.3911.) Such a value indicated that Rhea had an almost homogeneous interior (with some compression of ice in the center) while the existence of a rocky core would imply a moment of inertia of about 0.34. In the same year, another paper claimed the moment of inertia was about 0.37. (Note: More precisely, 0.3721.) Rhea being either partially or fully differentiated would be consistent with the observations of the Cassini probe. A year later, yet another paper claimed that the moon may not be in hydrostatic equilibrium, meaning that the moment of inertia cannot be determined from the gravity data alone. In 2008, an author of the first paper tried to reconcile these three disparate results. He concluded that there is a systematic error in the Cassini radio Doppler data used in the analysis, but, after restricting the analysis to a subset of data obtained closest to the moon, he arrived at his old result that Rhea was in hydrostatic equilibrium and had a moment of inertia of about 0.4, again implying a homogeneous interior.

The triaxial shape of Rhea is consistent with a homogeneous body in hydrostatic equilibrium rotating at Rhea's angular velocity. Modelling in 2006 suggested that Rhea could be barely capable of sustaining an internal liquid-water ocean through heating by radioactive decay; such an ocean would have to be at about 176 K, the eutectic temperature for the water–ammonia system. More recent indications are that Rhea has a homogeneous interior and therefore this ocean does not exist.

=== Surface features ===
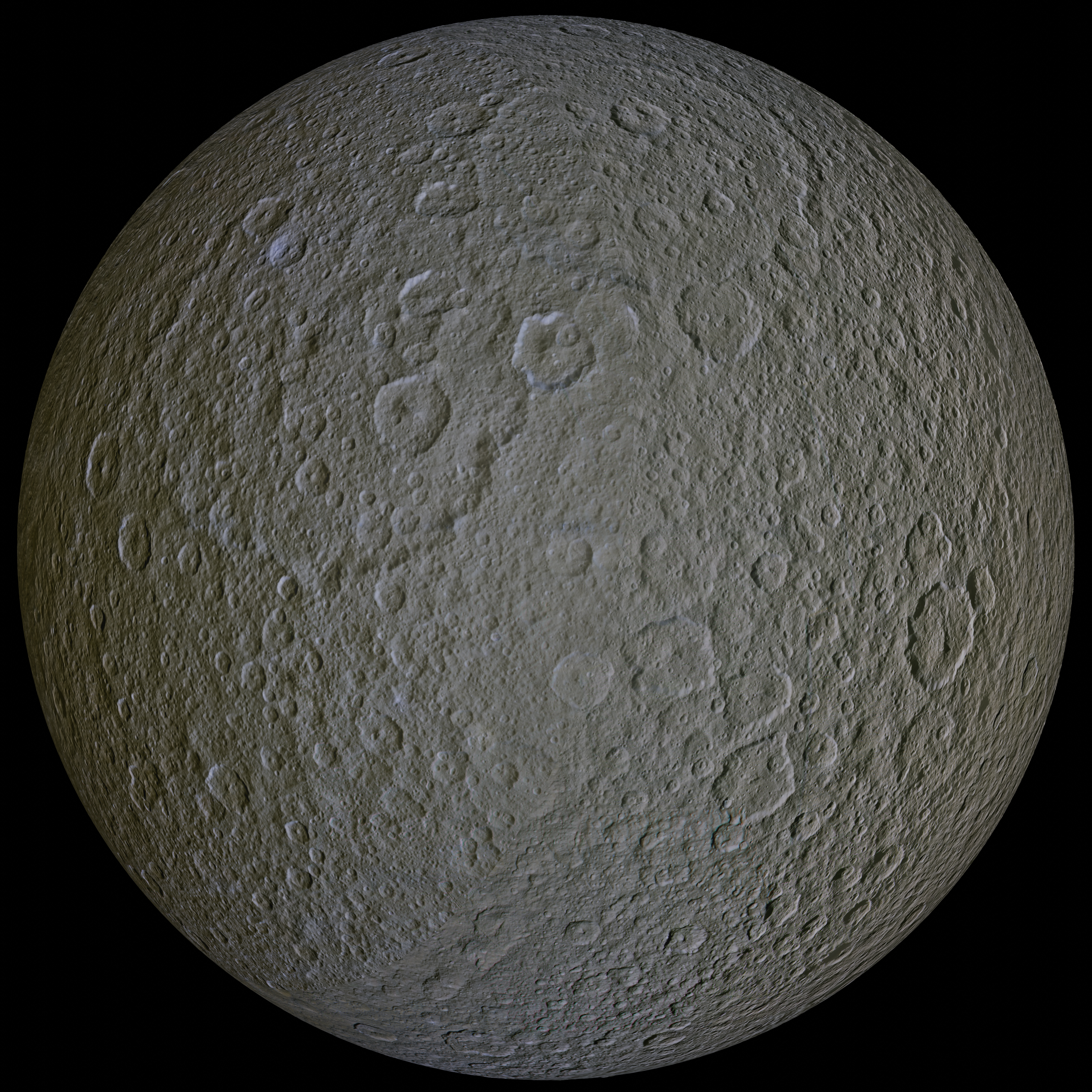
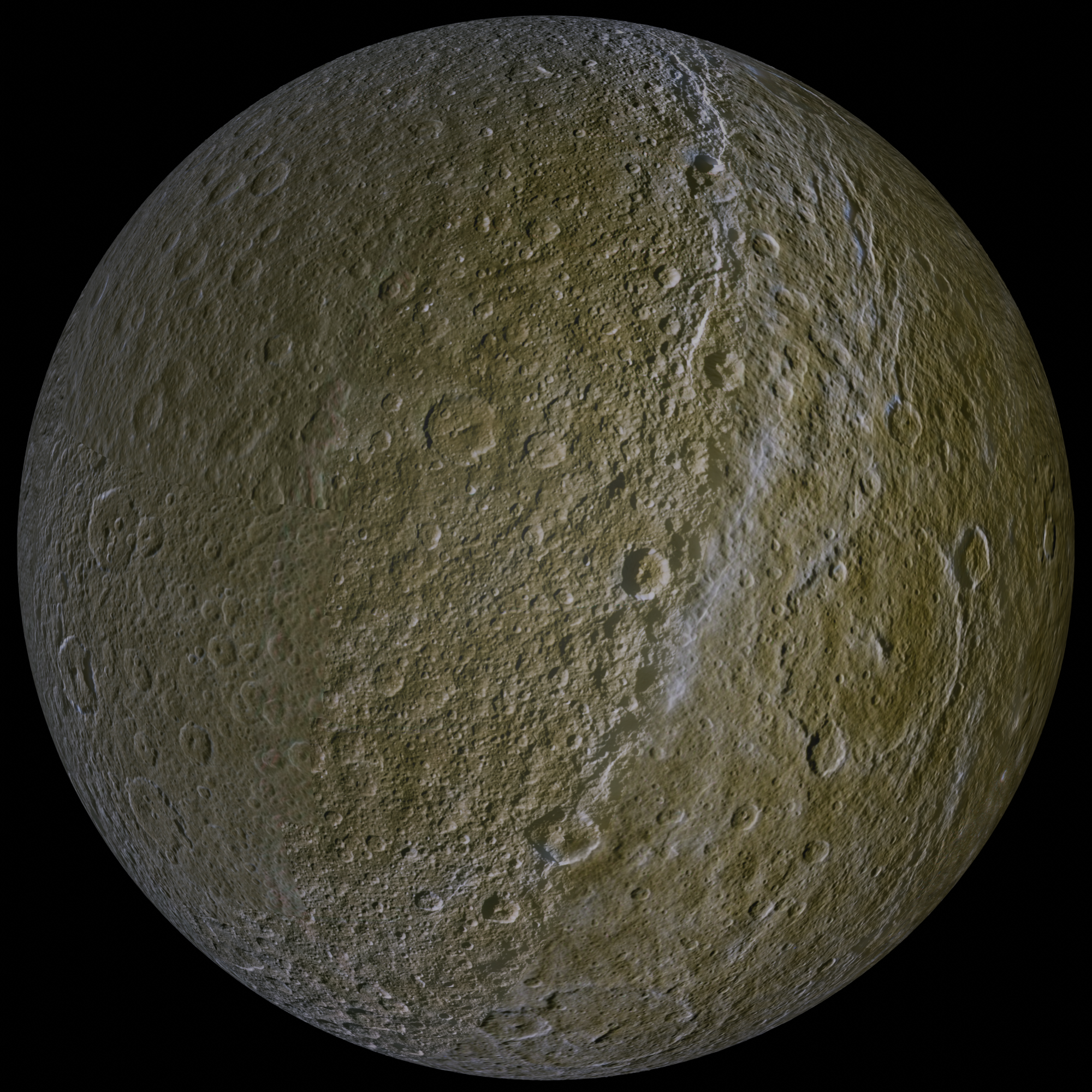

Rhea's features resemble those of Dione, with distinct and dissmillar leading and trailing hemispheres, suggesting similar composition and histories. The temperature on Rhea is 99 K (−174 °C) in direct sunlight and between 73 K (−200 °C) and 53 K (−220 °C) in the shade.

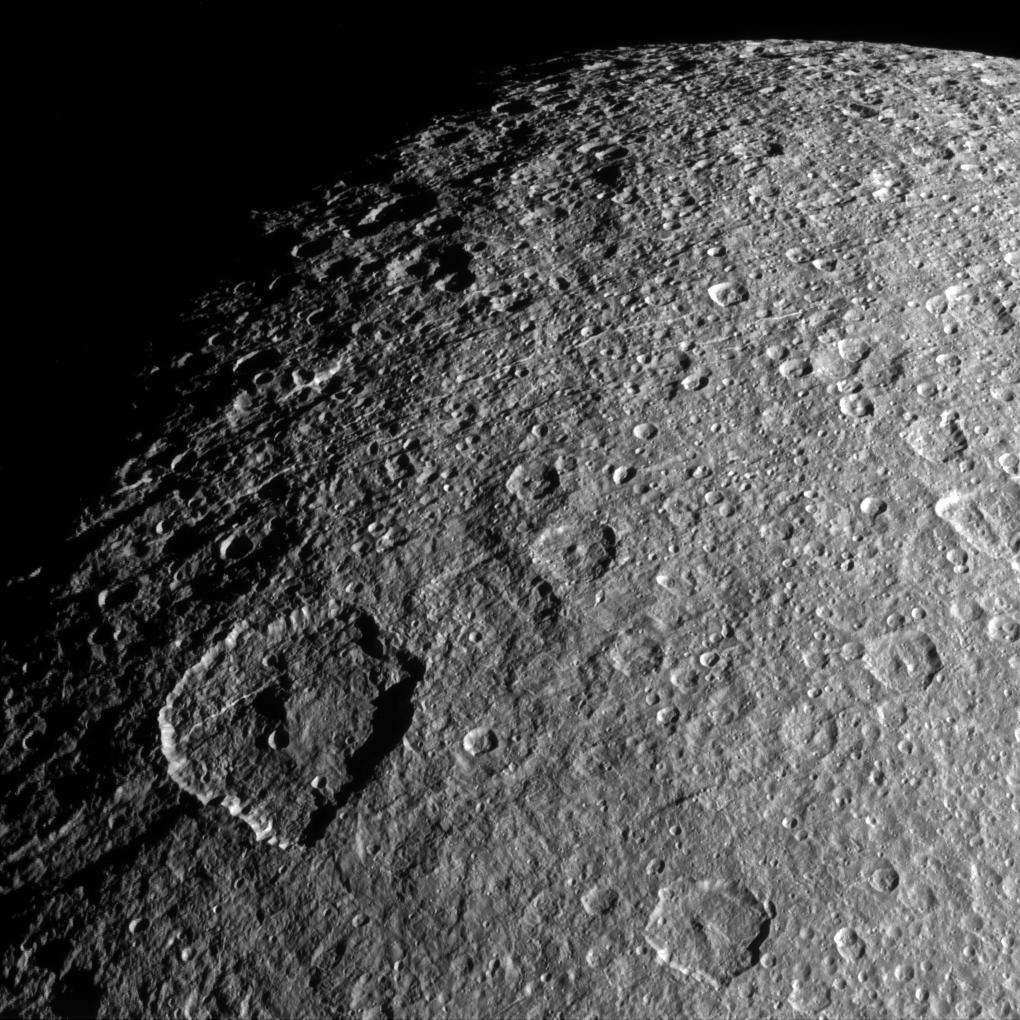
Surface features on Rhea well defined due to the lighting

Rhea has a rather typical heavily cratered surface, with the exceptions of a few large Dione-type chasmata or fractures (formerly known as wispy terrain) on the trailing hemisphere (the side facing away from the direction of motion along Rhea's orbit) and a very faint "line" of material at Rhea's equator that may have been deposited by material deorbiting from its rings. Rhea has two very large impact basins on its hemisphere facing away from Saturn, which are about 400 and 500 km across. The more northerly and less degraded of the two, called Tirawa, is roughly comparable in size to the basin Odysseus on Tethys. There is a 48 km-diameter impact crater at 112°W that is prominent because of an extended system of bright rays, which extend up to 400 km (250 mi) away from the crater, across most of one hemisphere. This crater, called Inktomi, is nicknamed "The Splat", and may be one of the youngest craters on the inner moons of Saturn. This was hypothesized in a 2007 paper published by Lunar and Planetary Science. Rhea's impact craters are more crisply defined than the flatter craters that are pervasive on Ganymede and Callisto; it is theorized that this is due to a much lower surface gravity (0.26 m/s^{2}, compared to Ganymede's 1.428 m/s^{2} and Callisto's 1.235 m/s^{2}) and a stiffer crust of ice. Similarly, ejecta blankets – asymmetrical blankets of ejected particles surrounding impact craters – are not present on Rhea, potentially another result of the moon's low surface gravity.

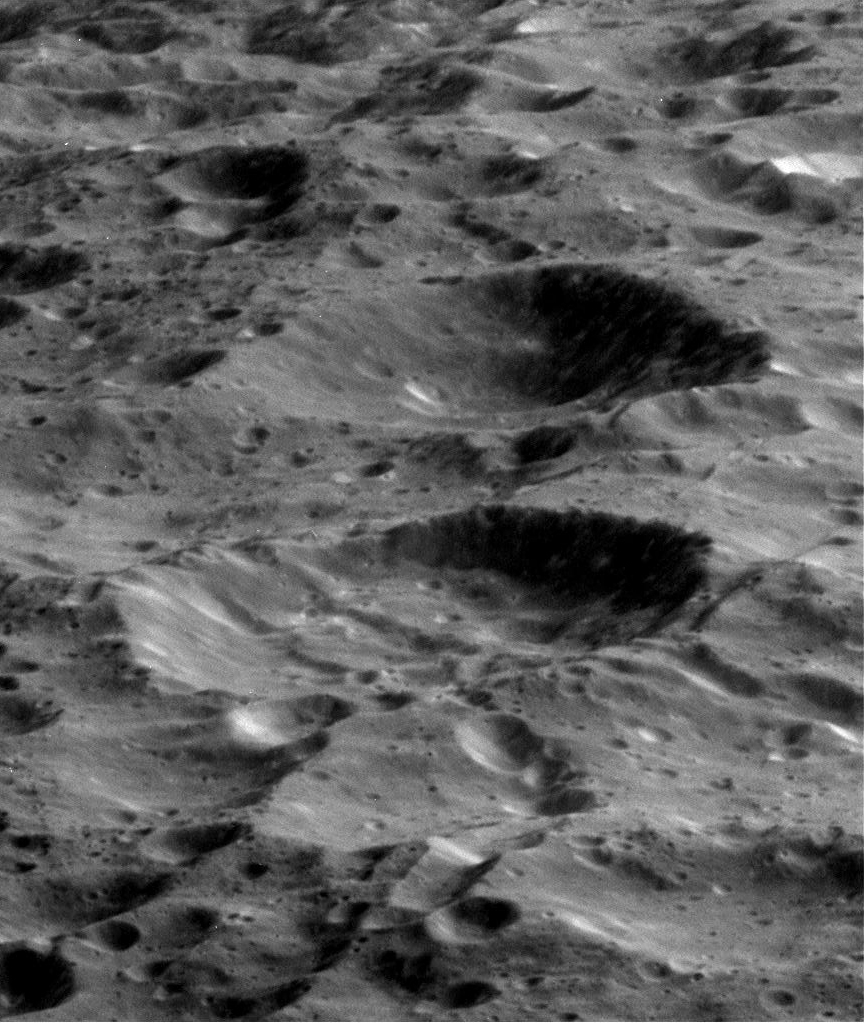
Closeup showing two craters on Rhea's surface taken in 2013 by Cassini spacecraft

Its surface can be divided into two geologically different areas based on crater density; the first area contains craters which are larger than 40 kilometres (25 mi) in diameter, whereas the second area, in parts of the polar and equatorial regions, has only craters under that size. This suggests that a major resurfacing event occurred some time during its formation. The leading hemisphere is heavily cratered and uniformly bright. As on Callisto, the craters lack the high relief features seen on the Moon and Mercury. It has been theorized that these cratered plains are up to four billion years old on average. On the trailing hemisphere there is a network of bright swaths on a dark background, and fewer craters. It is believed, based on data from the Cassini probe, that these are tectonic features: depressions (graben) and troughs, with ice-covered cliff sides causing the lines' whiteness (more technically their albedo). The extensive dark areas are thought to be deposited tholins, which are a mix of complex organic compounds generated on the ice by pyrolysis and radiolysis of simple compounds containing carbon, nitrogen and hydrogen. The trailing side of Rhea's surface is irradiated by Saturn's magnetosphere, which may cause chemical-level changes on the surface, including radiolysis (see § Atmosphere). Particles from Saturn's E-ring are also flung onto the moon's leading hemisphere, coating it.

Rhea has some evidence of endogenic activity – that is, activity originating from within the moon, such as heating and cryovolcanic activity: there are fault systems and craters with uplifted bases (so-called "relaxed" craters), although the latter is apparently only present in large craters more than 100 km (62 mi) across.

== Formation ==
The moons of Saturn are thought to have formed through co-accretion, a similar process to that believed to have formed the planets in the Solar System. As the young giant planets formed, they were surrounded by discs of material that gradually coalesced into moons. However, a model proposed by Erik Asphaug and Andreas Reufer for the formation of Titan may also shine a new light on the origin of Rhea and Iapetus. In this model, Titan was formed in a series of giant impacts between pre-existing moons, and Rhea and Iapetus are thought to have formed from part of the debris of these collisions.

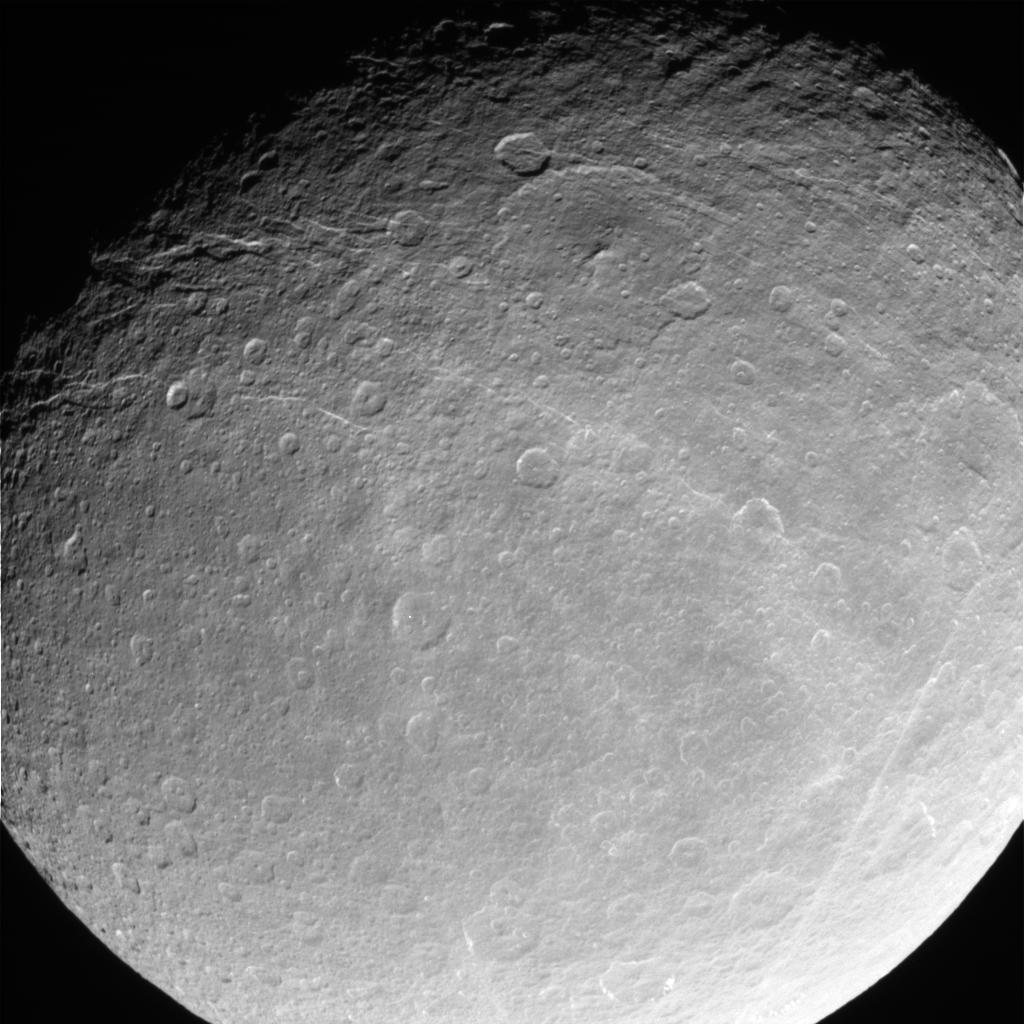
Image of the wispy hemisphere, showing ice cliffs – Powehiwehi (upper center); chasmata stretch from upper left to right center – Onokoro Catenae (lower right)

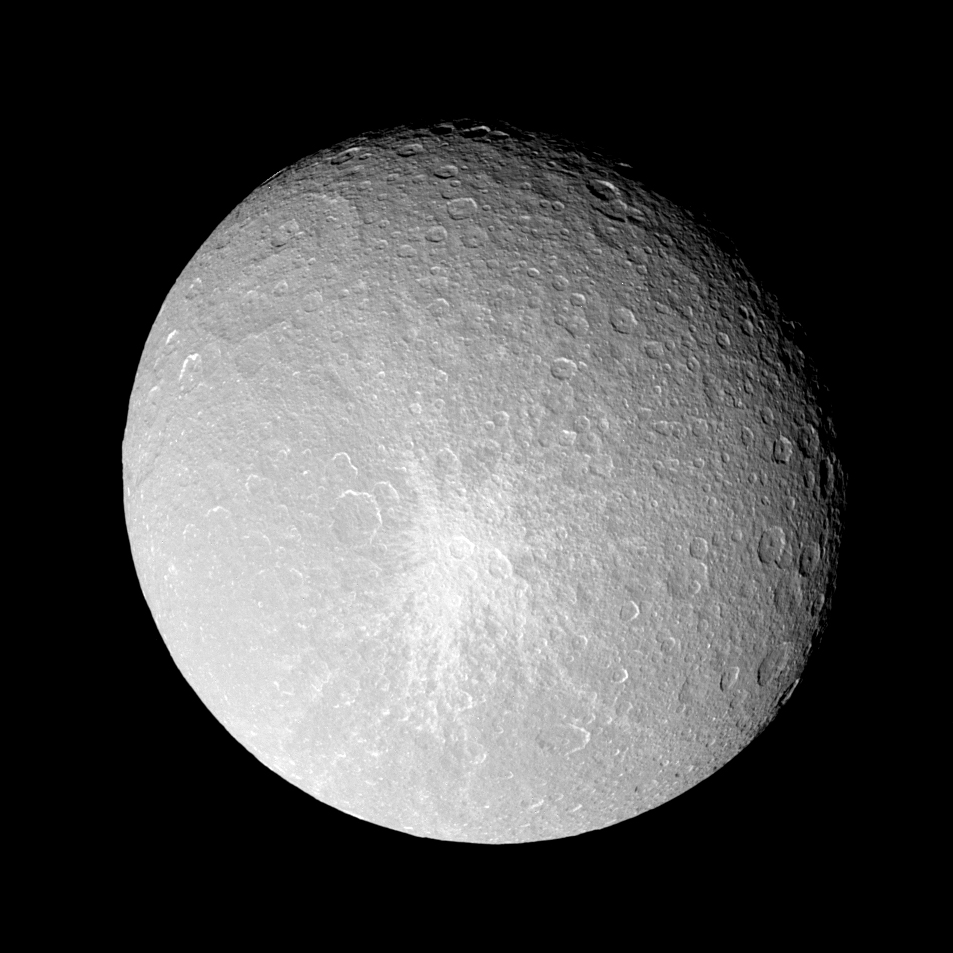
View of Rhea's leading hemisphere with crater Inktomi and its prominent ray system just below center; impact basin Tirawa is at upper left

== Atmosphere ==
On November 27, 2010, NASA announced the discovery of an extremely tenuous atmosphere—an exosphere. It consists of oxygen and carbon dioxide in proportion of roughly 5 to 2. The surface density of the exosphere is from 10^{5} to 10^{6} molecules in a cubic centimeter, depending on local temperature. The main source of oxygen is radiolysis of water ice at the surface via irradiation from the magnetosphere of Saturn. The source of the carbon dioxide is less clear, but it may be related to oxidation of the organics present in ice or to outgassing of the moon's interior.

== Possible ring system ==
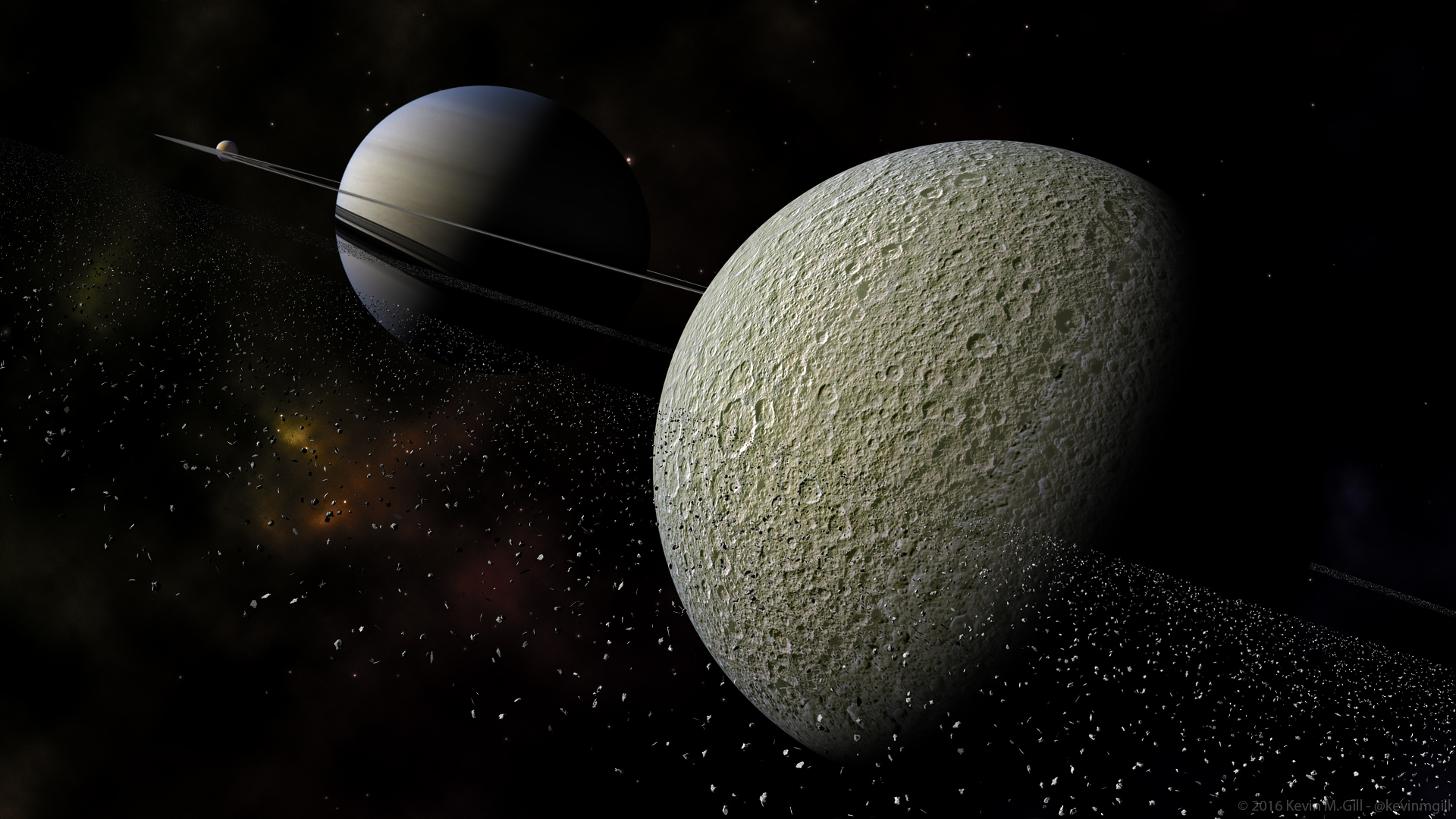
Artist's impression of Rhea's unconfirmed rings

On March 6, 2008, NASA announced that Rhea may have a weak ring system. This would mark the first discovery of rings around a moon. The rings' existence was inferred by observed changes in the flow of electrons trapped by Saturn's magnetic field as Cassini passed by Rhea. Dust and debris could extend out to Rhea's Hill sphere, but were thought to be denser nearer the moon, with three narrow rings of higher density. The case for a ring was strengthened by the subsequent finding of the presence of a set of small ultraviolet-bright spots distributed along Rhea's equator (interpreted as the impact points of deorbiting ring material). However, when Cassini made targeted observations of the putative ring plane from several angles, there was no evidence of ring material found, suggesting that another explanation for the earlier observations is needed.

== Exploration ==
The first images of Rhea were obtained by the Voyager spacecraft in 1980–1981.

There were five close targeted fly-bys by the Cassini orbiter, which was one part of the dual orbiter and lander Cassini–Huygens mission. Launched in 1997, Cassini–Huygens was targeted at the Saturn system; in total it took more than 450 thousand images. Cassini passed Rhea at a distance of 500 km (310 mi) on November 26, 2005; at a distance of 5,750 kilometres (3,570 mi) on August 30, 2007; at a distance of 100 km on March 2, 2010; at 69 kilometres (43 mi) flyby on January 11, 2011; and a last flyby at 992 kilometres (616 mi) on March 9, 2013.

== See also ==
- Former classification of planets
- List of natural satellites
- Rhea in fiction
- Rings of Rhea
- Subsatellite
- Moons of Saturn
