= Mbombo =

God in the religion of the Kuba people

Mbombo, also called Bumba, is the creator god in the religion and mythology of the Kuba people of Central Africa in the area that is now known as Democratic Republic of the Congo. In the Mbombo creation myth, Mbombo was a giant in form and white in color. The myth describes the creation of the universe from nothing.

== Story ==
The story of Mbombo's creation tells that in the beginning, Mbombo was alone, and darkness and primordial water covered all the earth. It would happen that Mbombo came to feel an intense pain in his stomach, and then Mbombo vomited the sun, the moon, and stars. The heat and light from the sun evaporated the water covering the earth, creating clouds, and after time, the dry hills emerged from the water. Then Mbombo vomited once more, bringing forth nine animals: the leopard, called Koy Bumba; the eagle, Ponga Bumba; the crocodile, Ganda Bumba; the fish, Yo Bumba; the tortoise, Kono Bumba; a black leopard-like animal, Tsetse Bumba; a white heron, Nyanyi Bumba; a scarab; and a goat named Budi. Mbombo also vomited many men; one of them was called Loko Yima and was white like Mbombo.

These nine animals went on to create all the world's creatures. The heron created all flying birds but one, the kite, and the crocodile created snakes and the iguana. The goat, Budi, brought forth all the horned animals, the scarab all insects, and Yo Bumba, all fish.

Three of Mbombo's sons then said they would finish creating the world. The first to try, Nyonye Ngana, vomited white ants, but died after. To honor him, the ants went deep in the earth for dark soil to bury him and transformed the barren sands at the earth's surface. The second, Chonganda, created the first plant, which in turn gave rise to all trees, grasses and flowers. And Chedi Bumba, the third son, made the last bird, the kite.

Tsetse Bumba caused trouble on the earth so Mbombo chased her into the sky where she became the thunderbolt. This left people without fire, so Mbombo showed them how to make it from trees. Once the creation was complete and peaceful, Mbombo delivered it to mankind and retreated into the heavens, Yima to serve as "god upon the earth". The woman of the waters, Nchienge, lived in the East, and her son, Woto, became the first king of the Kuba.

== See also ==
- Bushongo mythology
- Ex nihilo
