= Inktomi (crater) =

Crater on Rhea

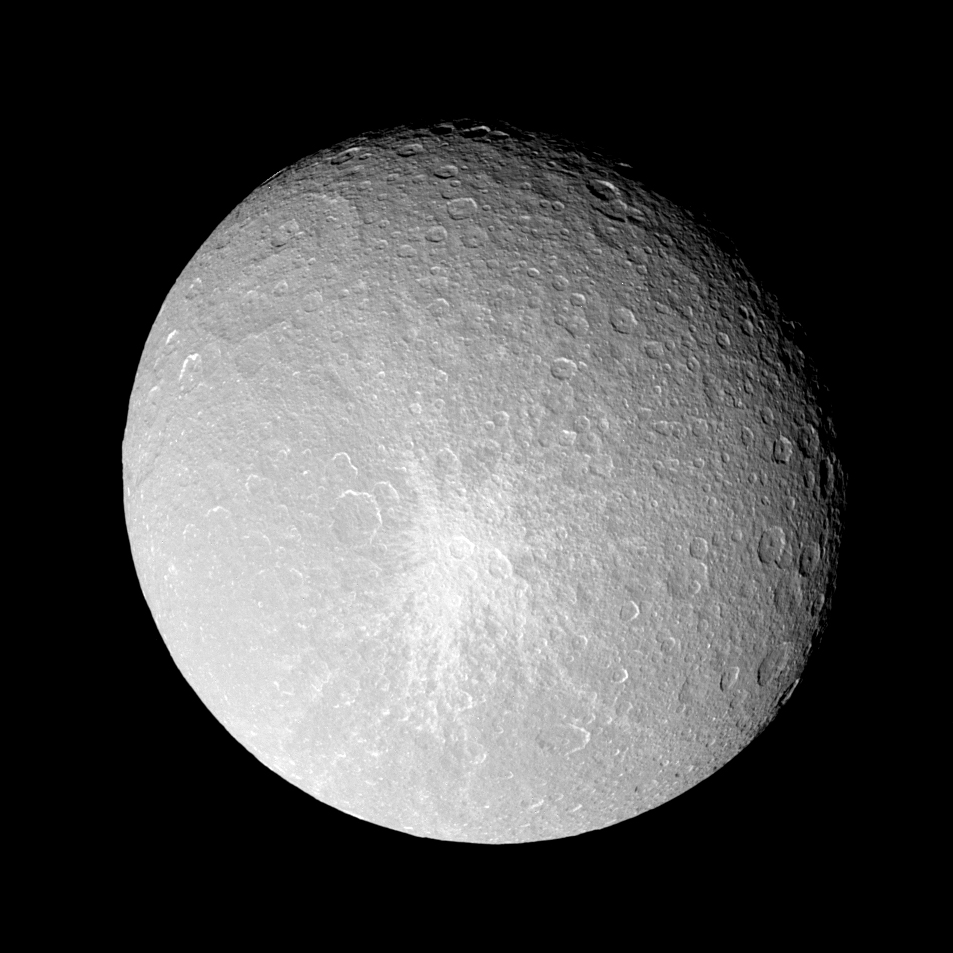
- A Cassini image of Rhea. Inktomi is a prominent feature on Rhea, seen here characterized by its light color and butterfly-wing ejecta
- Feature type: Central peak impact crater
- Location: Rhea
- Coordinates: 14°6′S 112°6′W
- Diameter: 47.2 km (29.3 mi)
- Depth: ~3.6 km (2.2 mi) (mean depth)
- Age: 8 to 280 million years
- Eponym: Iktomi

Inktomi, informally nicknamed the Splat, is a prominent rayed impact crater 47.2 kilometres (29.3 mi) in diameter located in the southern hemisphere of Saturn's moon Rhea. The crater is named for the Lakota spider-god Iktomi and is located at 14.1 S, 112.1 W. Inktomi is thought to be the youngest major surface feature on Rhea, with estimates ranging from 8 to 280 million years.

== Geology ==
At roughly 47 kilometers in diameter, Inktomi is a complex crater with a central peak. The crater has an average depth of ~3.6 kilometers, though some sections of the crater floor are deeper or shallower by up to 0.5 kilometers. The central peak structure of Inktomi is roughly 14 kilometers wide and rises 1.25 kilometers above the crater floor. Rather than the typical conical mountain characteristic of the central peaks of many craters, Inktomi's central peak appears to be a complex system of converging ridges and subsidiary mountain peaks.

The rayed ejecta pattern indicates an oblique impact occurred from the west. The impact ejected pure water ice from beneath Rhea's surface creating a region contrastingly lighter than the surrounding regions. Recent analysis of Cassini's VIMS data revealed clean water ice without impurities at the crater and in its ejecta. Reassessment of the images from orbit, using additional images taken from Inktomi and its surroundings, confirms a continuous ejecta blanket almost devoid of small craters, indicative of a geologically recent impact. A 3-dimensional anaglyph constructed from Cassini VIMS images shows a hilly crater floor with a prominent but topographically low central peak complex. While regular radial secondaries occur outside of the continuous ejecta blanket associated with the bright rays, clusters of numerous small craters could be identified in the eastern part of the crater floor and in the adjacent continuous ejecta. These small craters were most likely created by material ejected from the Inktomi impact at a steep angle.
