= Petrópolis =

- Municipality
- Municipality of Petrópolis
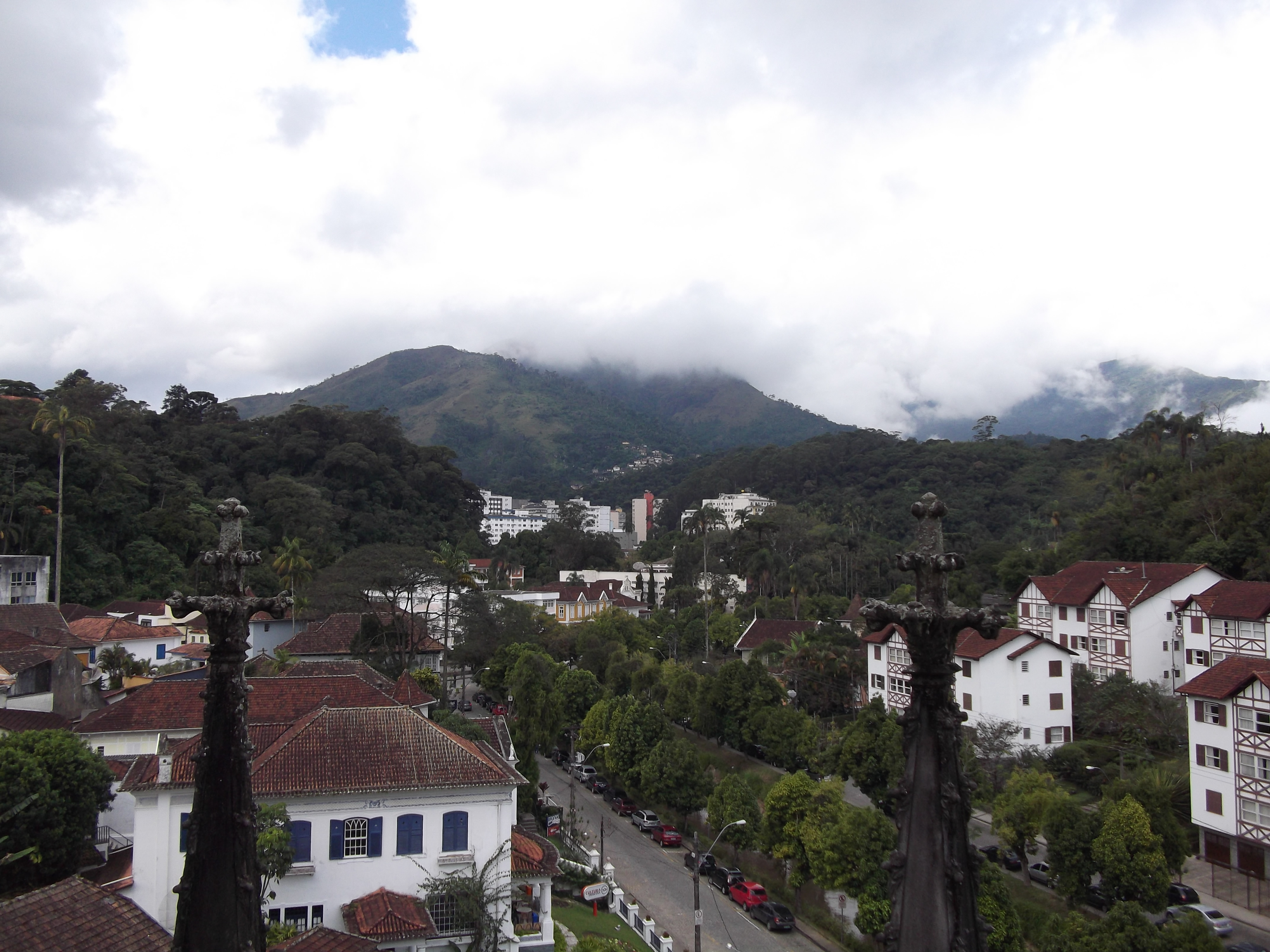
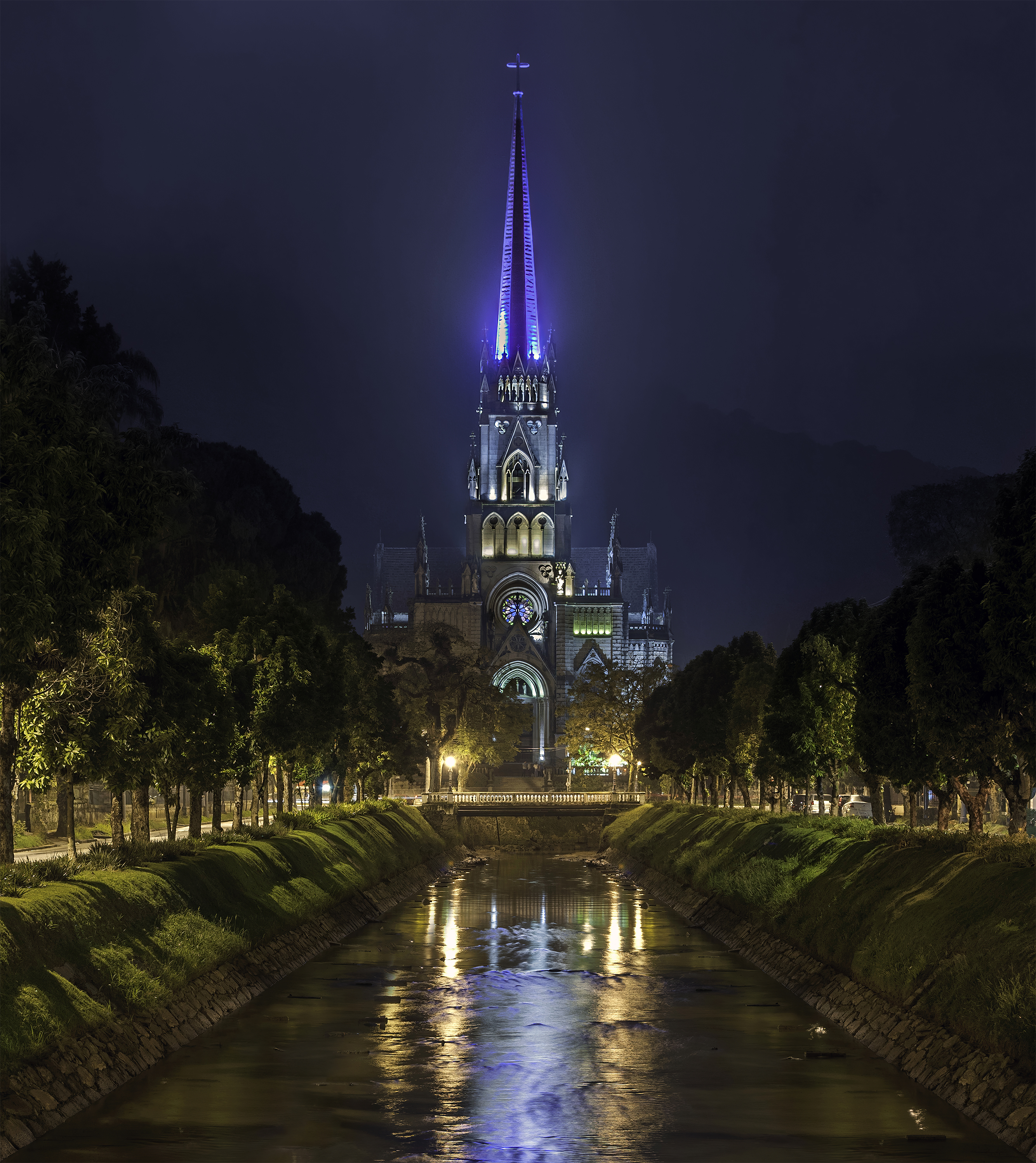
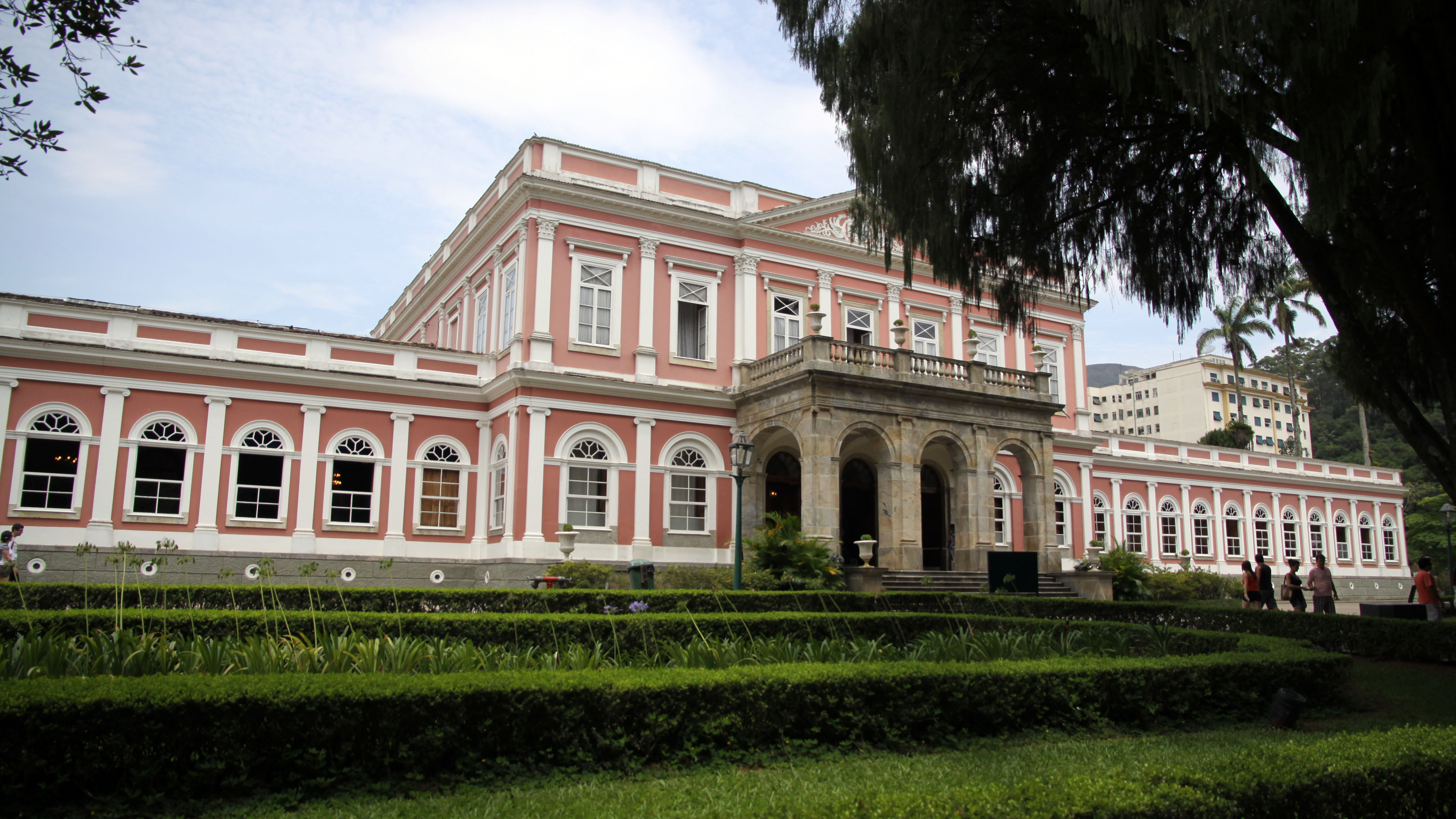
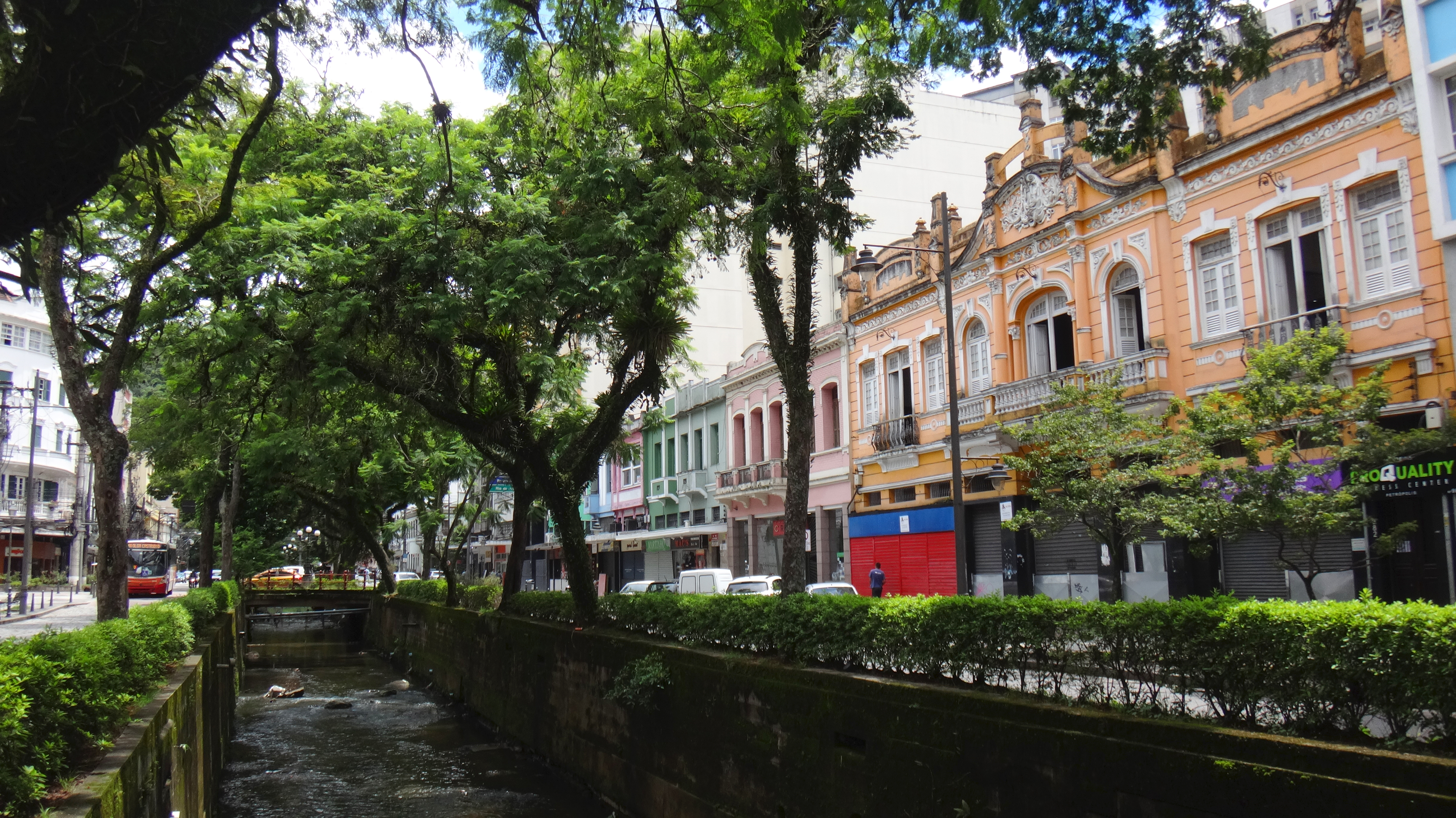
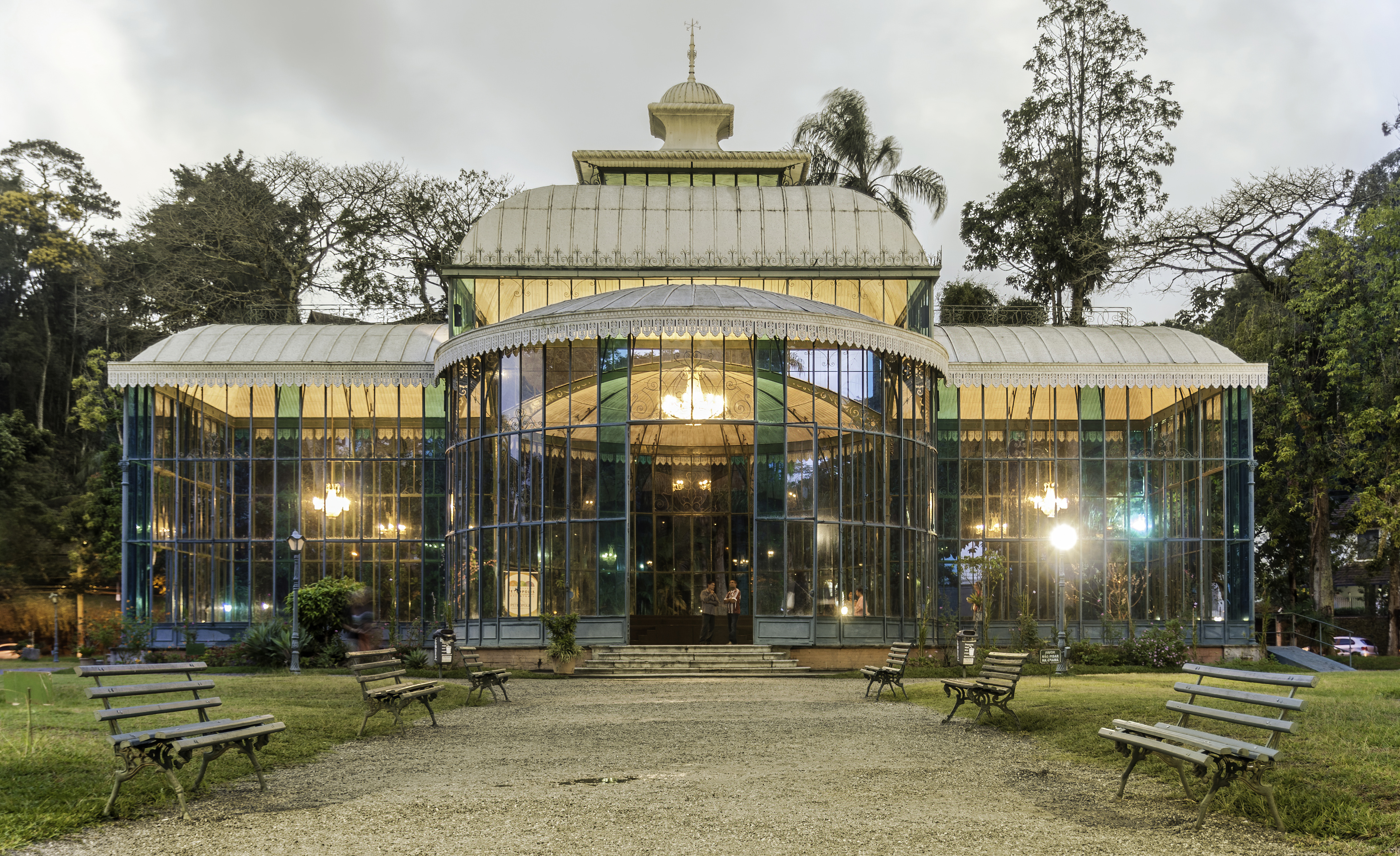
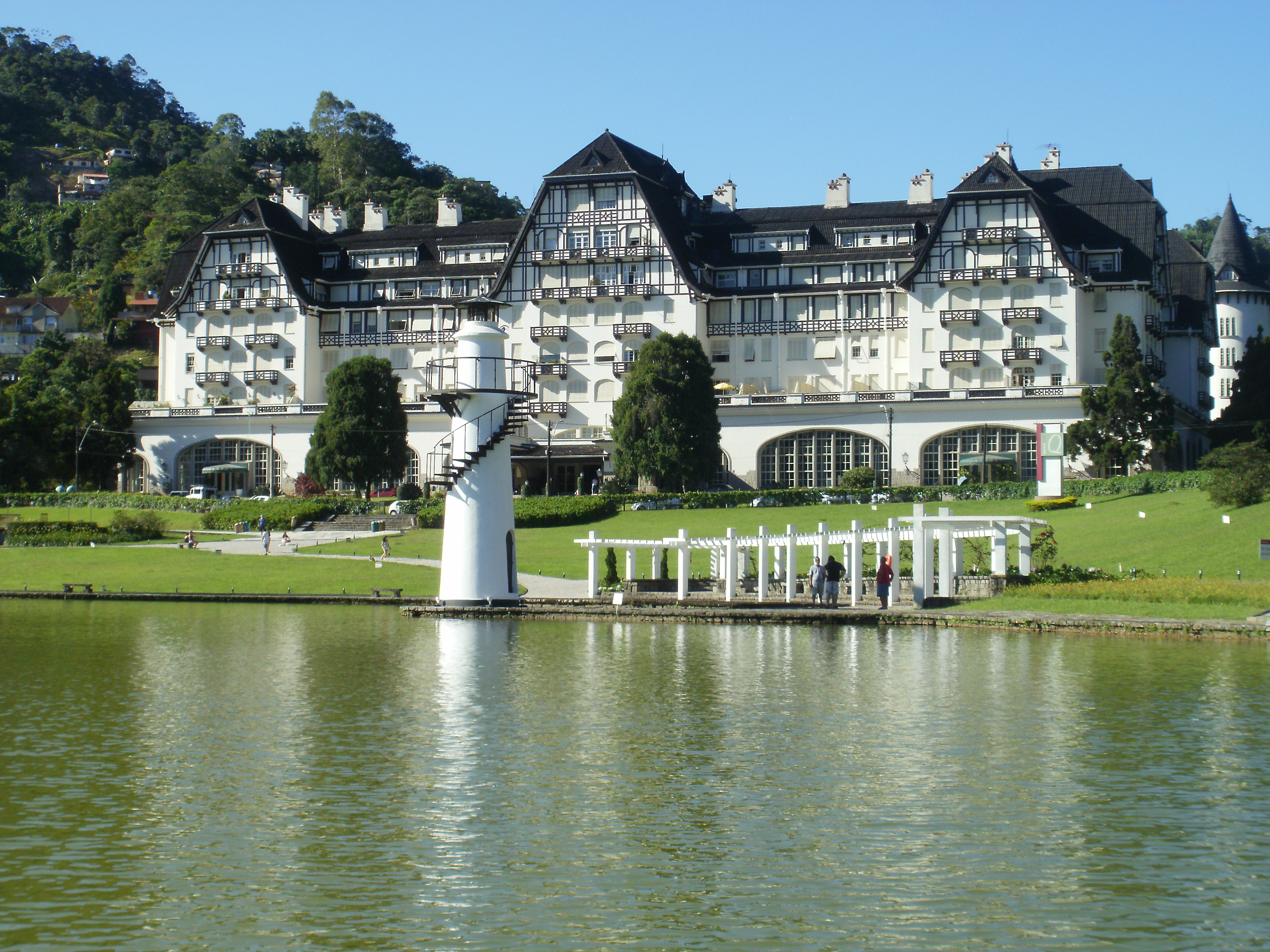
- From upper left: skyline of downtown, city's Cathedral, Imperial Museum, Imperador street, Crystal Palace and Quitandinha Palace.

- Flag Coat of arms
- Nickname: The Imperial City
- Motto: "Altiora Semper Petens" (Latin for "Always seeking higher things")
- Location of Petrópolis in the state of Rio de Janeiro

- Location of Petrópolis in Brazil
- Coordinates: 22°30′18″S 43°10′44″W
- Country: Brazil
- Region: Southeast
- State: Rio de Janeiro
- Founded: 16 March 1843
- Named for: Pedro II of Brazil

Government
  - Type: Mayor-council
  - Mayor: Hingo Hammes (DEM)

Area
  - Total: 795.798 km^{2} (307.259 sq mi)
- Elevation: 838 m (2,749 ft)

Population (2022)
  - Total: 278,881
  - Estimate (2025): 294,926
  - Rank: 99th
  - Density: 384.42/km^{2} (995.6/sq mi)
- Demonym: petropolitano
- Time zone: UTC−3 (BRT)
- Postal Code: 25680-000
- Area code: +55 24
- HDI (2010): 0,745 – high (UNDP)
- Website: www.petropolis.rj.gov.br

Petrópolis (Portuguese: [peˈtɾɔpolis, -pu-]) is a city of the estado (state) of central Rio de Janeiro, in southeastern Brazil, in a valley of the Órgãos Mountains, 40 kilometres (25 mi) north of Rio de Janeiro city. According to the 2022 Brazilian census, Petrópolis municipality had a population of 278,881 inhabitants. Besides being the largest and most populous city in the Fluminense Mountain Region, the city also has the largest Gross Domestic Product and Human Development Index in the region.

The town's name ("City of Peter") honors Pedro II, the last Emperor of Brazil, who is entombed there at the Cathedral of Saint Peter of Alcantara. The city was the summer residence of the Brazilian Emperors and aristocrats in the 19th century, and was the official capital of the state of Rio de Janeiro during the First Brazilian Republic, between 1894 and 1902.

== History ==
=== Colonial period ===
Historical affiliations

Empire of Brazil 1843–1889
Republic of Brazil 1889–present

Until the 18th century, the region was inhabited by the índios coroados (crowned Indians), which earned it the Portuguese name of "Sertão dos Índios Coroados". It was only with the discovery of gold in Minas Gerais and the consequent opening of the new way of the mines that passed through Petrópolis in that century that the region began to be occupied by non-Indians. The town's origins can be traced to Bernardo Soares de Proença, who between 1722 and 1725 opened an alternative route between Rio de Janeiro and Minas Gerais, across the Serra da Estrela called "Caminho Novo das Minas" (New Mines Road).

=== Imperial period ===
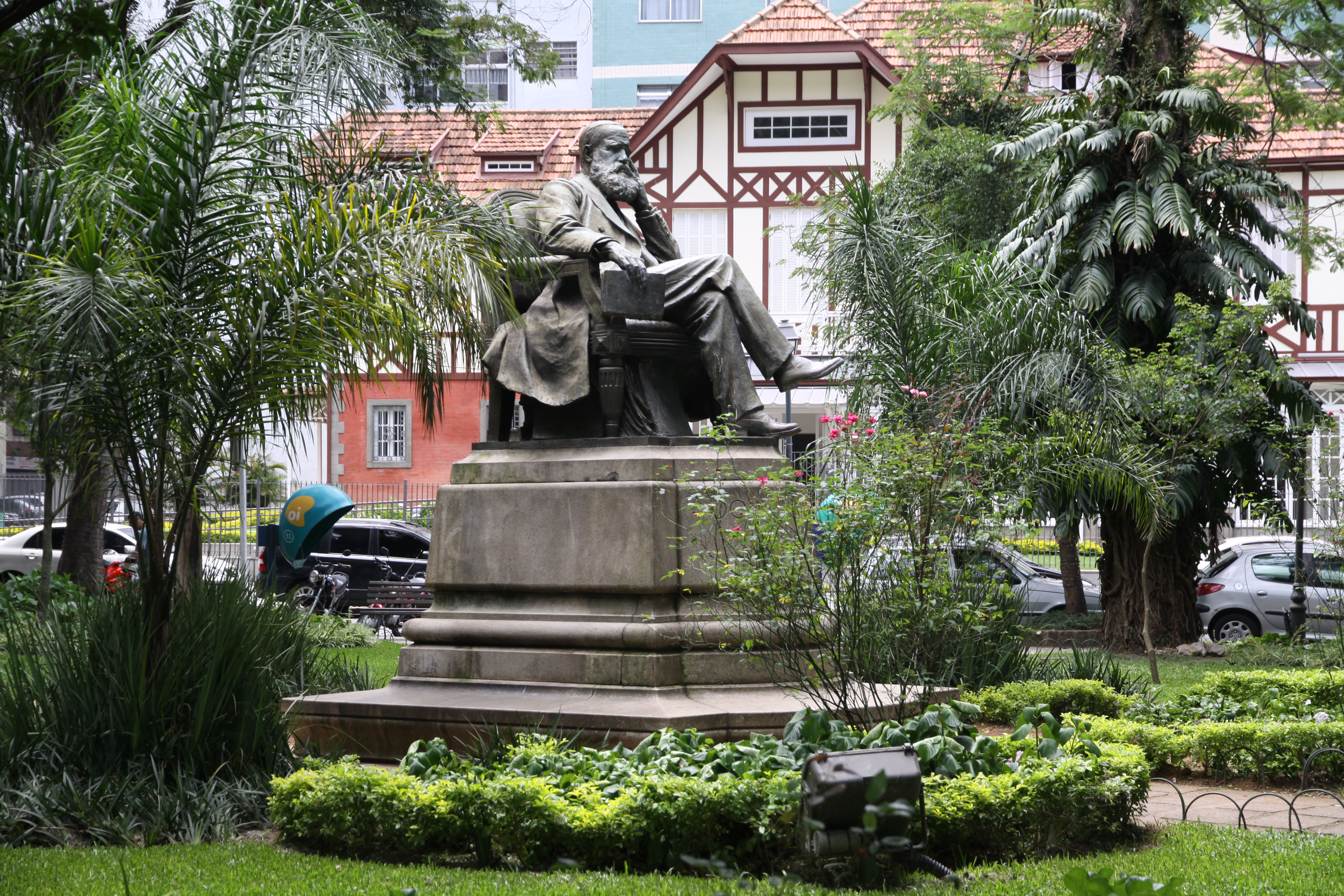
Statue of Emperor Pedro II

While traveling to Minas Gerais along this route in 1822, Emperor Pedro I stayed at a farm owned by a Catholic priest, named Correia, and found the region's climate pleasant. As the priest's sister and heiress refused to sell his property, the Emperor bought the neighboring one, called the Córrego Seco Farm, in 1830. He had his summer palace built there, but never saw it finished, because he stepped down from the throne on April 7, 1831. Other Brazilian aristocrats eventually followed suit.

His son, Emperor Pedro II, on March 16, 1843, signed an imperial decree ordering the construction of a settlement (to be formed with the arrival of German immigrants) and the construction of the dreamy summer palace on his outlying lands, the cornerstone of which was settled by the Emperor in May 1845, and that was ready in 1847. Conceived by Major Julius Friedrich Koeler, it is considered to be the second planned city in Brazil (after Recife, designed during the Dutch period), being composed of an urban nucleus – the city (now the center), where the Imperial Palace, Public buildings, commerce and services.

From then on, the city became the de facto capital of the Empire of Brazil during the summer, with the whole court moving. Large numbers of well-to-do inhabitants of the city of Rio de Janeiro also spent the summer in Petrópolis to escape the outbreaks of yellow fever. Emperor Pedro II ruled for 49 years, and remained in Petrópolis for at least forty summers, for up to five months. On 29 September 1857, the town was elevated to the status of a city. In 1861, the first Macadamized Highway in Brazil, Estrada União e Indústria, was inaugurated, connecting Petrópolis to the city of Juiz de Fora in Minas Gerais. In 1883, a railroad arrived at the city on the initiative of the Baron of Mauá. Also in 1877, the first telephone line in Brazil (and the first outside of the United States) was built, connecting Pedro's summer palace to his farm headquarters.

Regardless of the time of year, foreign diplomatic representatives lived in Petrópolis for most of the imperial period.

=== Republican period ===
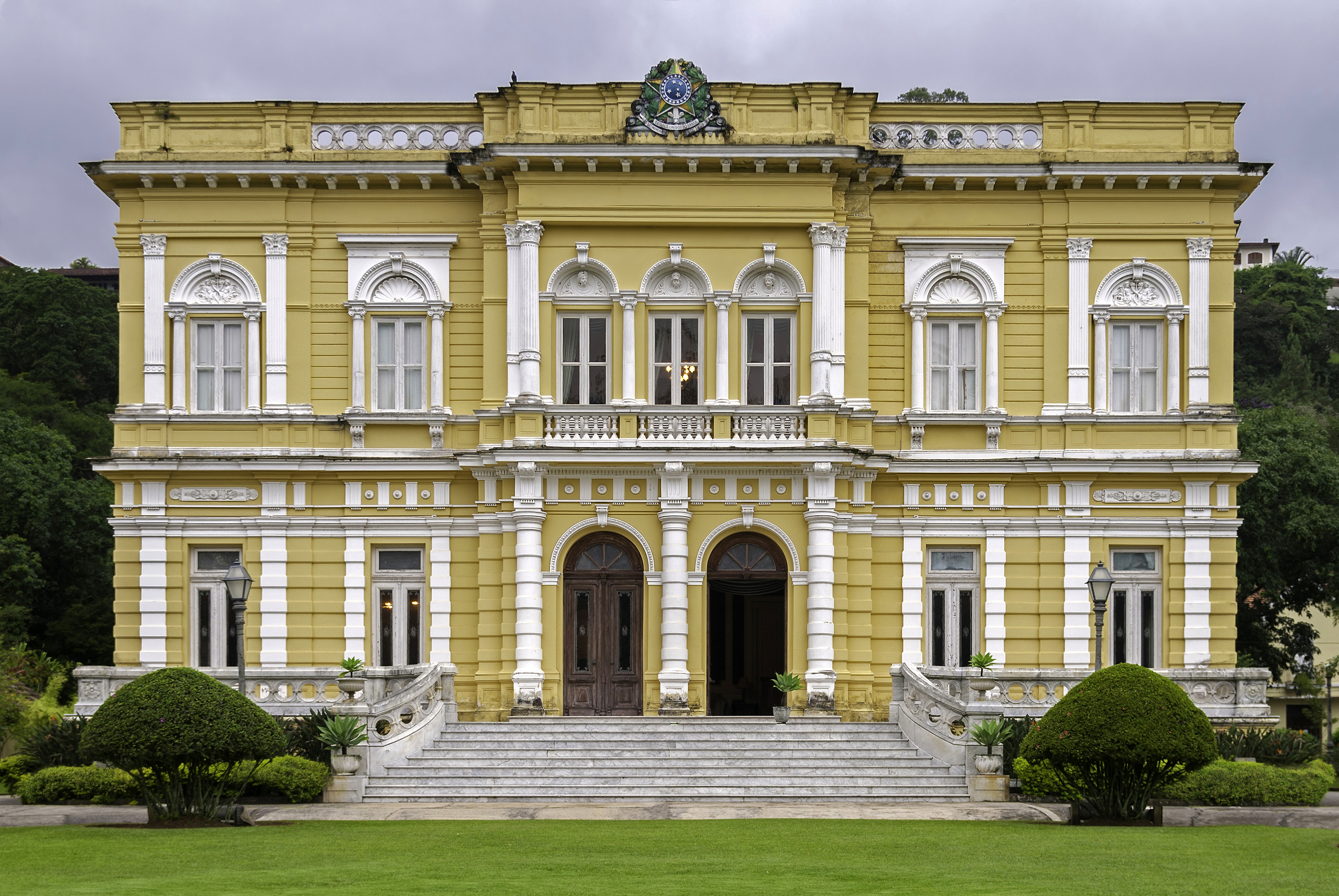
Palácio Rio Negro, former summer residence of several Brazilian Presidents

Even after the establishment of the Republic and the exile of the Imperial family in 1889, the city continued to play a significant role in Brazilian history. It was a frequent choice as a summer residence for Presidents of the republic, who lodged at the Palácio Rio Negro (Black River Palace). The most frequent of them was Getúlio Vargas, whose stays, during Estado Novo, lasted up to three months.

Between 1894 and 1902, the city was capital of the State of Rio de Janeiro, replacing Niterói, due to the two Navy Revolts. Also in this period, was chosen Hermogênio Silva, the only Deputy Governor of Rio de Janeiro whose political base was in Petrópolis. In 1897, the first cinema session took place in the city, with a cinematographer showing the Lumière brothers' first films. In 1903, the Treaty of Petrópolis, which gave Brazil the Acre territory, was signed between Brazil and Bolivia, at the residence of the Baron of Rio Branco. The sanitarian Oswaldo Cruz was named its first mayor in 1916. On the premises of the Quitandinha Palace, the declaration of war of the American countries to the Axis powers was signed during World War II (1939–1945). One of the world's leading authors in the interwar period, Austrian-born Stefan Zweig and his second wife attempted to escape the war in Petrópolis, moving there in 1941. They committed suicide the following year, the same year Brazil entered the war. In 2006, their Petrópolis house was made into a museum, Casa Stefan Zweig.

During the Brazilian military government in the 1970s, the city was home to a military center for torture that has been referred to as the "House of Death".

In 1973 the remains of Isabel, Princess Imperial of Brazil (1846–1921), and her husband, the Count of Eu, were brought to be buried in the Imperial Mausoleum. The Princess received a funeral of the Head of State with the presence of the most important leaders of the Republic and the Brazilian Imperial Family and it was declared a public holiday.

On 15 February 2022, over 150 people were killed by floods in Petrópolis following intense rainfall that caused mudslides.

== Geography ==
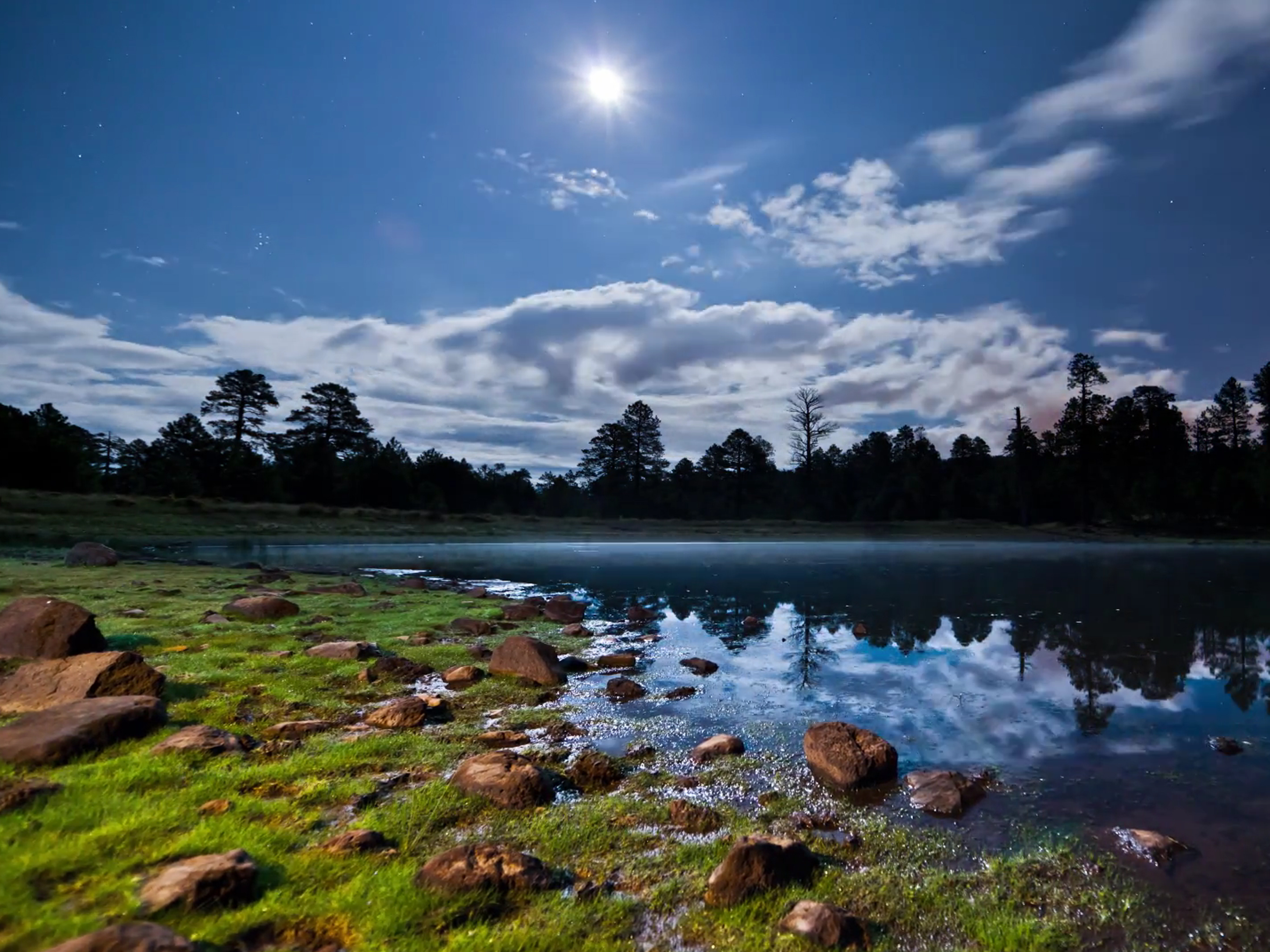
Indaiá's brook

Nestled among the forested hills of the Serra dos Órgãos, in the valley of the Quitandinha and Piabanha rivers, Petrópolis is a popular winter holiday spot. Besides the climate and surroundings, the main attraction is the former Summer Palace of the last Brazilian Emperor, which is now the Imperial Museum, specializing in Imperial history and memorabilia.

Petrópolis is home to the National Laboratory for Scientific Computing, a research unit of the Ministry of Science and Technology of the Brazilian Federal Government. The municipality holds part of the Central Rio de Janeiro Atlantic Forest Mosaic of conservation units, created in 2006. The 16.7-hectare (41-acre) Petrópolis Municipal Nature Park is in the historical center of the city of Petrópolis. It is part of the Petrópolis Environmental Protection Area and the Atlantic Forest Biosphere Reserve. The municipality also contains the 530-hectare (1,300-acre) Pedra do Elefante Natural Monument.

=== Climate ===
Petrópolis has a tropical highland climate (Köppen climate classification: Cwa) caused by elevation with humid summers. The rainfall is approximately 1,383 mm (54.4 in) per annum.

The municipality contains part of the 26,260 hectares (64,900 acres) Tinguá Biological Reserve, a strictly protected Atlantic Forest conservation unit created in 1989.

The temperatures are mild. The annual average is around 19 °C (66 °F). In warmer months, the average temperature is 23 °C (73 °F) and the average of the coldest month is 15 °C (59 °F). According to the National Institute of Meteorology (Instituto Nacional de Meteorologia), the lowest temperature recorded was −0.7 °C (30.7 °F) on August 2, 1955, and the highest temperature recorded was 36.6 °C (97.9 °F), on November 6, 2009.

Climate data for Petrópolis (Granja Jurity), elevation 980 m (3,220 ft), (1981–2010 normals, extremes 1986–2007)
Month	Jan	Feb	Mar	Apr	May	Jun	Jul	Aug	Sep	Oct	Nov	Dec	Year
Record high °C (°F)	35.4 (95.7)	35.0 (95.0)	33.2 (91.8)	33.4 (92.1)	29.3 (84.7)	29.6 (85.3)	30.9 (87.6)	33.1 (91.6)	35.1 (95.2)	34.3 (93.7)	34.5 (94.1)	33.1 (91.6)	35.4 (95.7)
Mean daily maximum °C (°F)	27.5 (81.5)	28.1 (82.6)	27.2 (81.0)	25.9 (78.6)	22.8 (73.0)	22.1 (71.8)	21.6 (70.9)	23.1 (73.6)	23.5 (74.3)	24.9 (76.8)	25.5 (77.9)	26.5 (79.7)	24.9 (76.8)
Mean daily minimum °C (°F)	17.7 (63.9)	17.7 (63.9)	17.0 (62.6)	15.8 (60.4)	13.0 (55.4)	11.8 (53.2)	11.3 (52.3)	12.0 (53.6)	13.4 (56.1)	14.8 (58.6)	15.8 (60.4)	17.0 (62.6)	14.8 (58.6)
Record low °C (°F)	11.2 (52.2)	11.4 (52.5)	11.7 (53.1)	9.5 (49.1)	5.2 (41.4)	4.0 (39.2)	3.5 (38.3)	4.8 (40.6)	5.0 (41.0)	5.9 (42.6)	5.8 (42.4)	9.1 (48.4)	3.5 (38.3)
Average precipitation mm (inches)	311.0 (12.24)	156.0 (6.14)	149.0 (5.87)	64.0 (2.52)	39.0 (1.54)	17.0 (0.67)	29.0 (1.14)	24.0 (0.94)	51.0 (2.01)	104.0 (4.09)	188.0 (7.40)	251.0 (9.88)	1,383 (54.44)
Average precipitation days	18	13	13	7	6	3	4	4	7	9	14	17	115
Average relative humidity (%)	83	84	85	86	87	84	83	82	80	81	82	86	84
Source 1: Instituto Nacional de Meteorologia
Source 2: Rio 2016 web site (precipitation and humidity)

== Demography ==
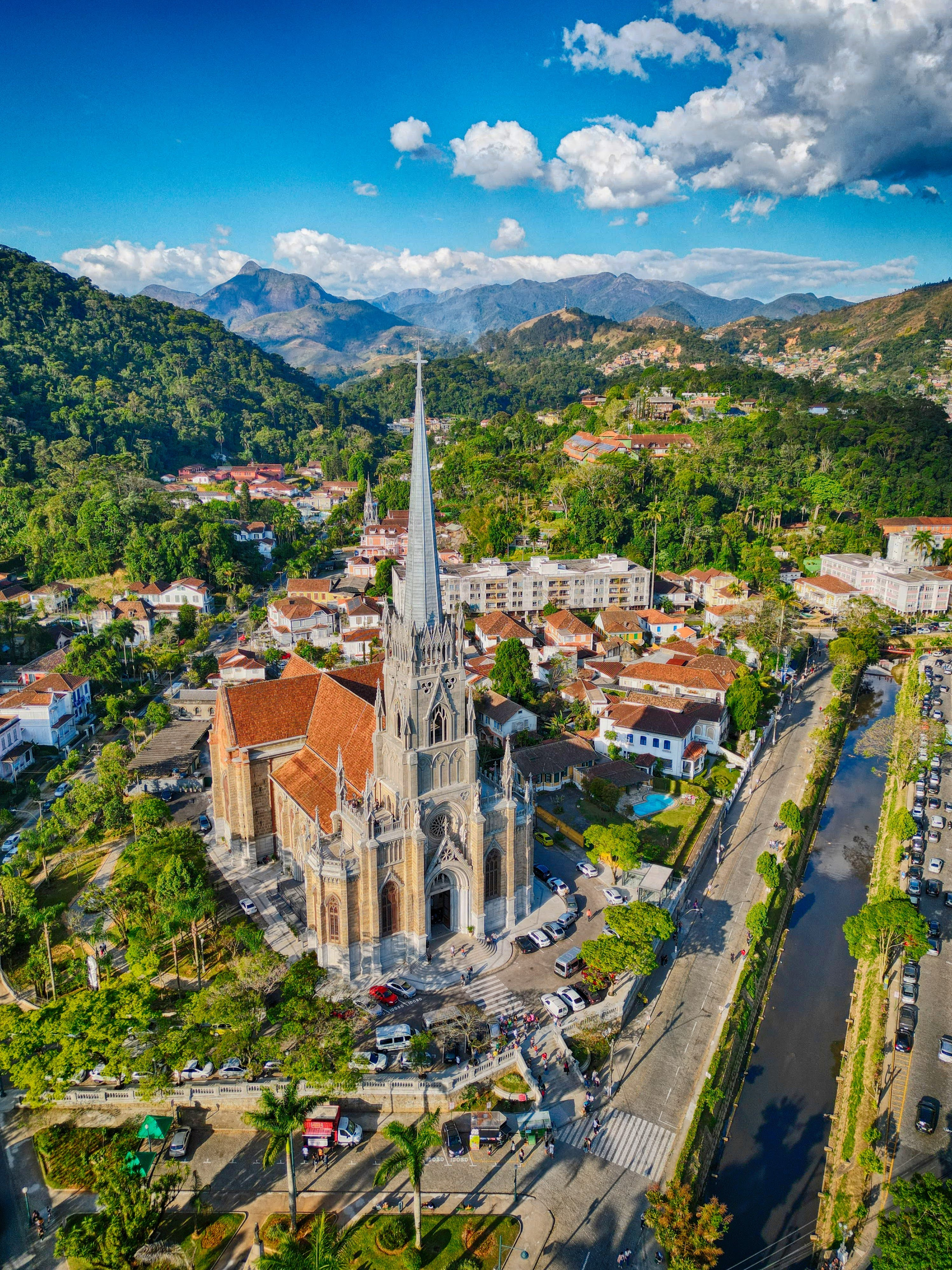
Cathedral of Petrópolis.

Petrópolis experienced a strong population growth in the late nineteenth century, which remained less significant throughout the twentieth century. Its population began to stagnate and then contract (even if in a mild way) around the beginning of 2000. According to 2010 data, 52.3% (approximately 155 thousand people) of the population belong to the female sex and 48.7% (about 145 thousand people) to the male sex.

=== Religion ===
According to the 2022 census of IBGE, Petrópolis is composed by:

- Roman Catholic Apostolic – 48.06%
- Protestants – 29.14%
- No religion (Including Atheists, and Agnostics) – 12.68%
- Kardecist Spiritists – 3.83%
- Umbanda and Candomblé – 1.47%
- Indigenous traditions – 0.03%
- Others – 4.57%

=== Ethnic composition ===
According to the 2010 demographic census, Petrópolis was home to 186,642 White people (63.5%), 75,025 Mixed people (25.4%), 31,463 Black people (10.6%), 970 Asian people (0.4%) and 281 Amerindian people (0.1%). The main people to participate in the ethnic/cultural formation of Petrópolis were the Germans, the Portuguese, and the Afro-Brazilians. Other ethnic groups like Italian, Syrian, French and Lebanese also had expressive participation in the formation of the city.

== City districts ==
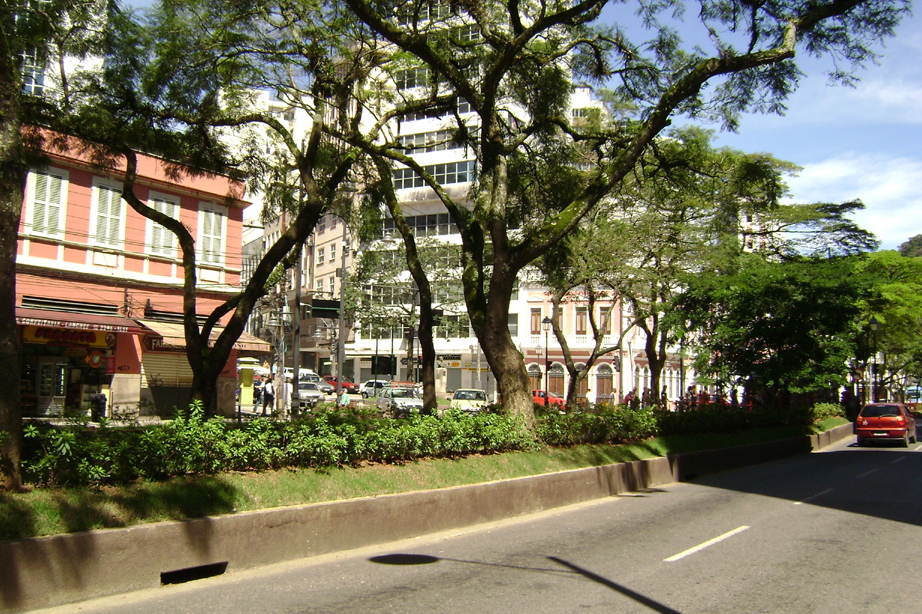
The Emperor St. is a commercial district of Petrópolis.

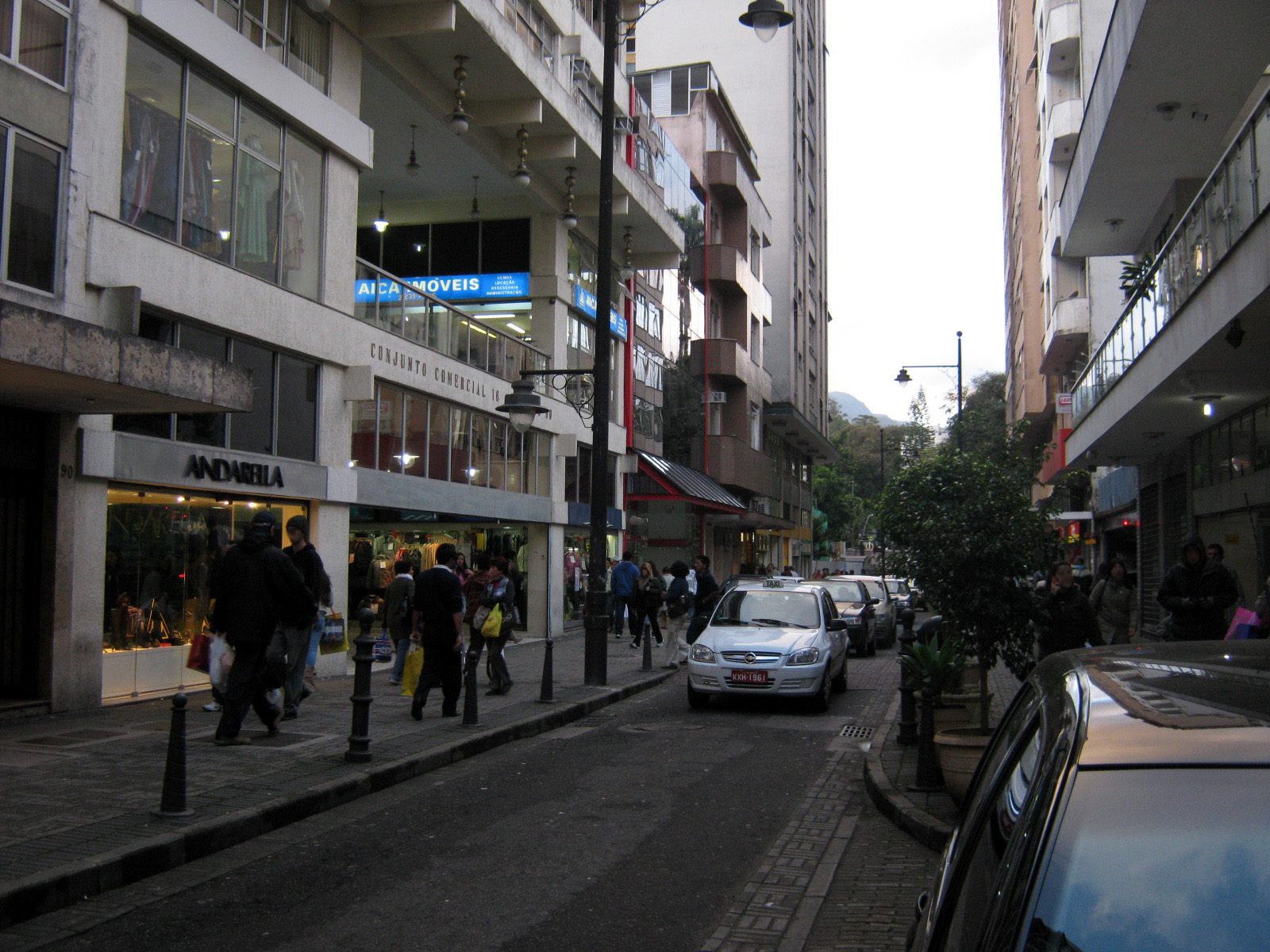
16 Março St. is a business district in downtown.

Petrópolis is divided into five districts, which are subdivided into smaller neighborhoods. These districts are subdivided into neighborhoods and/or urban and rural locations.

Petrópolis

- Downtown
- North zone: Quissamã, Retiro, Jardim Salvador, Itamarati (parte), Atílio Marotti, Quarteirão Brasileiro, among others.
- South zone: Valparaíso, Quitandinha, Duques, Taquara, Parque São Vicente, Coronel Veiga, Castelânea, Siméria, Duas Pontes, Ponte Fones, Quarteirão Suíço, Quarteirão Italiano, Independência, São Sebastião, Saldanha Marinho, Alto Independência, Mauá, among others.
- West zone: Bingen, Mosela, Duarte da Silveira, Capela, Castrioto, Pedras Brancas, Vila Militar, Rócio, Bataillard, Moinho Preto, Fazenda Inglesa, Quarteirão Ingelhein, Quarteirão Nassau, among others.
- East Zone: Morin, Alto da Serra, 24 de Maio, Vila Felipe, Vila Real, Campinho, Chácara Flora, Sargento Boening, Oswero Vilaça, Meio da Serra, among others.

Districts

- Cascatinha – Araras, Vale das Videiras, Bonsucesso, Carangola, Vila Manzini, Castelo São Manoel, Corrêas, Bairro da Glória, Itamarati, Estrada da Saudade, Nogueira, Samambaia, Jardim Salvador, Roseiral, Alcobacinha and Humberto Rovigatti.
- Itaipava – Madame Machado, Mangalarga, Vila Rica, Jardim Americano, Vale do Cuiabá, Benfica, Laginha, Gentio, Catubira, Ribeirão, Castelo, Reta, Sumidouro, Santa Mônica, Arranha-Céu, Parque Santa Maria, Parque dos Eucaliptos, Estrada das Arcas and centro de Itaipava
- Pedro do Rio – Secretário, Fagundes, Taquaril, Barra Mansa, among others.
- Posse – Brejal, Rio Bonito, Tremedeira, Granjas Raposo, Nossa Senhora de Fátima, Jacuba among others.

== Economy ==
Petrópolis' economy is based on tourism, services and industry. It is the 2nd largest beer production center in the country and the headquarters of major Brazilian brewery companies such as Grupo Petrópolis (which owns the beer brands Itaipava, Crystal, Lokal, Black Princess, and Petra) Bohemia, and also a Brasil Kirin Factory.

Other companies also have their headquarters in the city, such as the Mundo Verde network (Brazilian retailer of natural products) and the chocolate maker Katz. Currently, the project is being developed for the Industrial District of Posse, which aims to encourage industries in the 5th district of the city. Petrópolis has the 9th largest GDP of the state of Rio de Janeiro, in front of cities such as Nova Friburgo and Teresópolis, and, in national scope, more than six state capitals, such as Aracaju, Palmas, and Macapá.

The city's economy is still larger than entire states of the federation, such as Roraima and Acre.

=== Tourism ===
The high season of tourism in Petrópolis begins in July, with the beginning of Bauernfest, and the beginning of winter, which attracts tourists to the city with the cold weather. In 2014, some attractions increased by more than 30%, compared to the same period in 2013, due to the FIFA World Cup Brazil 2014.

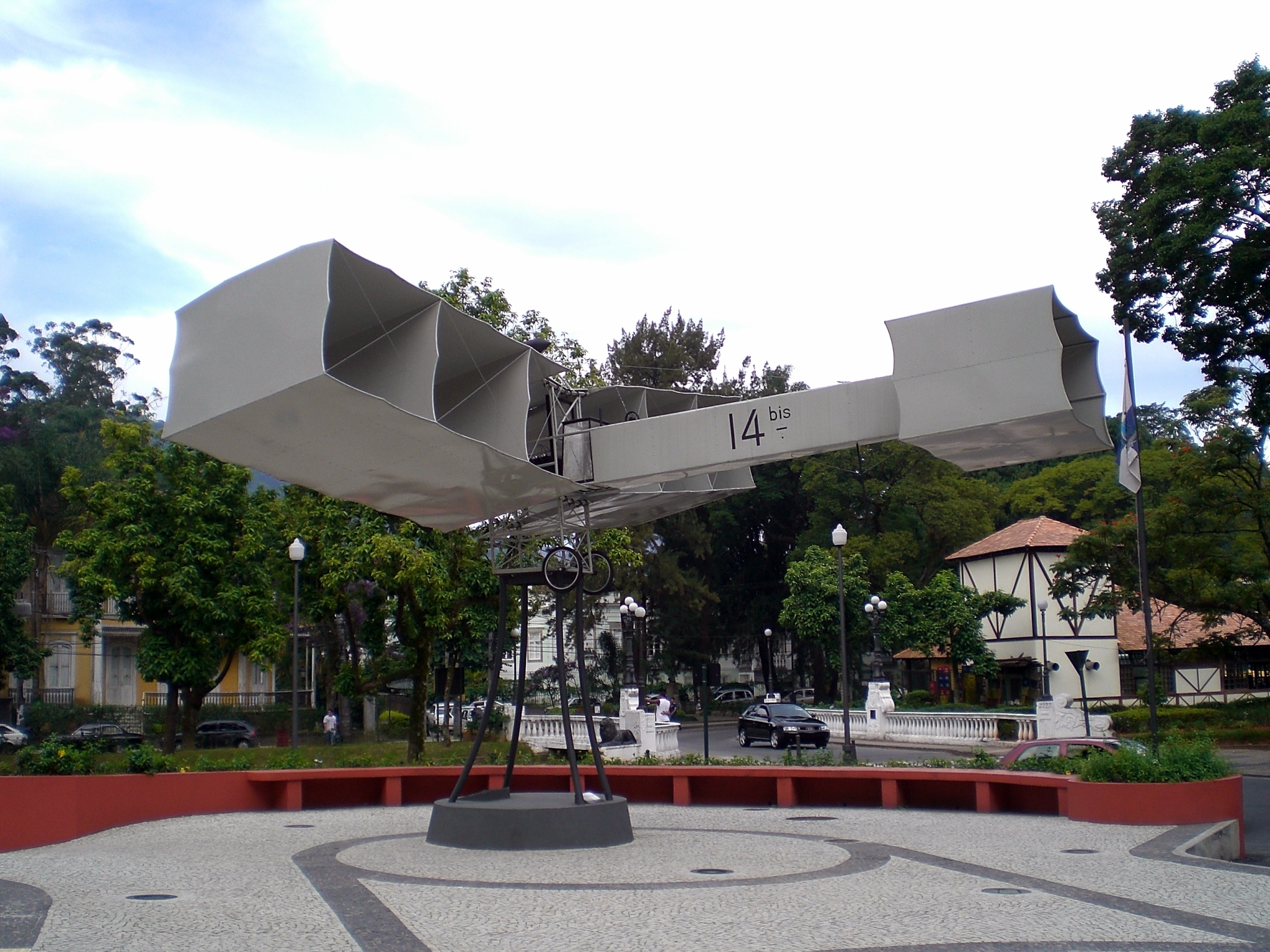
14-Bis Square

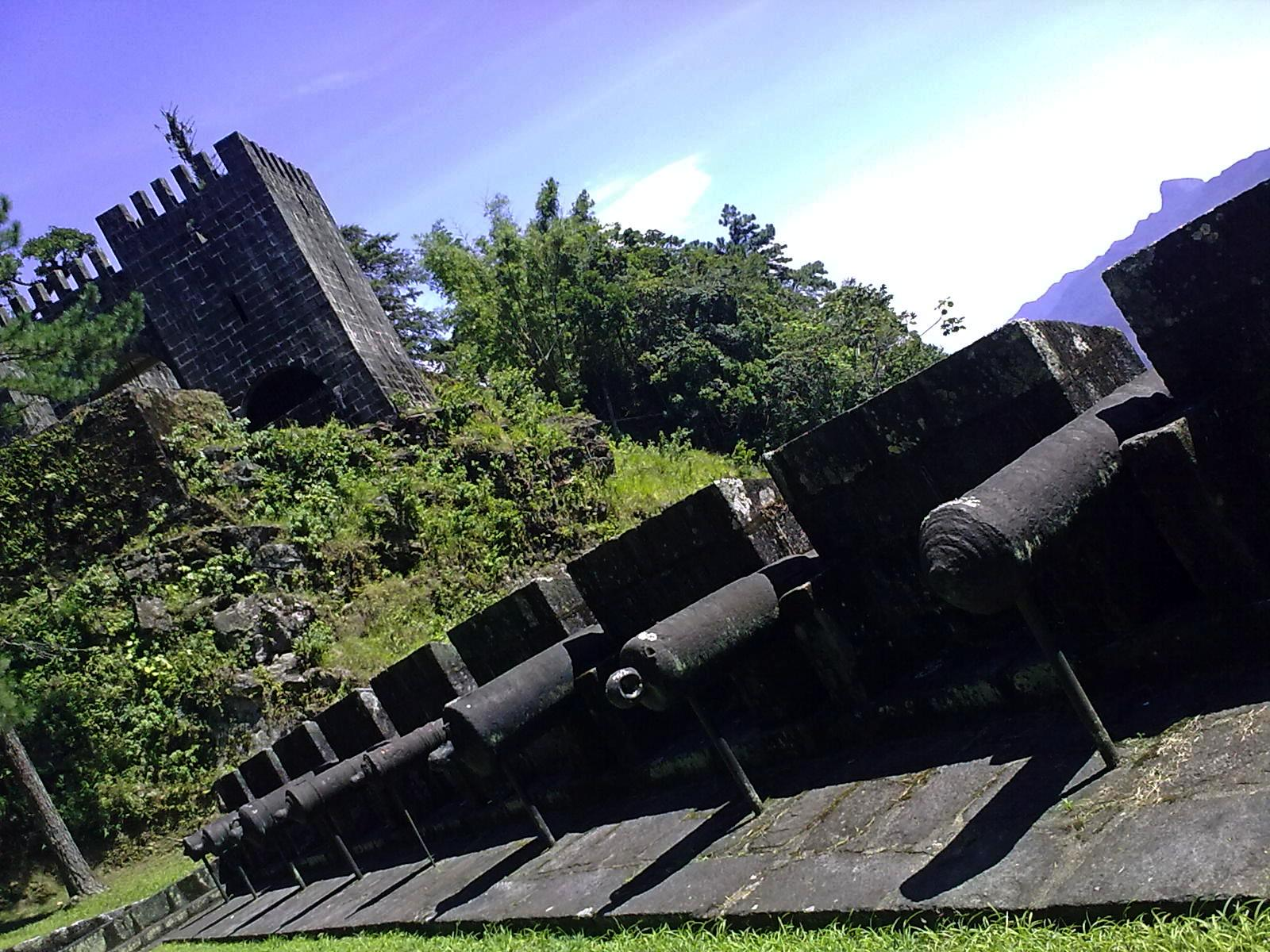
Museum of weapons

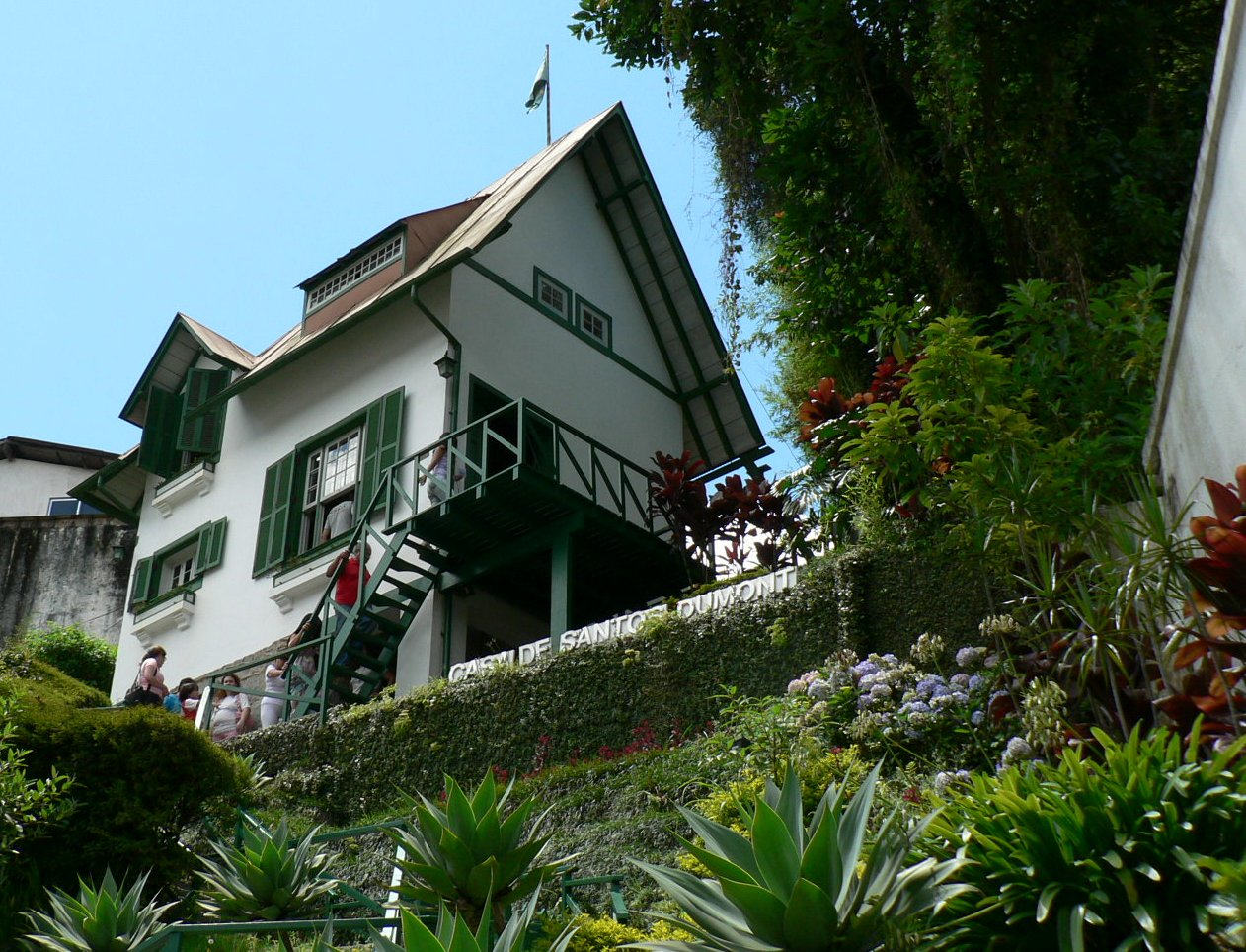
"The Enchanted", Alberto Santos-Dumont's Chalet

It is the city of the mountain region of Rio de Janeiro that receives more tourists per year. Petrópolis was the non-capital that progressed most in the Competitiveness Index of National Tourism in 2014, prepared by the Ministry of Tourism. According to the developers, the city is among the 15 best placed in Brazil in the overall ranking of competitiveness in tourism.

The main attractions of the city are:

- Açu Hill (Serra dos Órgãos National Park)
- Casa Stefan Zweig
- Castle of the Baron of Itaipava, (currently under reformation)
- Crystal Palace
- District of Itaipava, containing many popular attractions such as the "orto" market, vilareijo, and the municipal park located in the heart of the district.
- Fatima's Throne
- Grão-Pará Palace
- House of Ipiranga ("House of the Seven Mistakes")
- House of Joaquim Nabuco
- House of Princess Isabel
- House of Rui Barbosa
- House (chalet) of Santos-Dumont
- House of the Baron and Viscount of Arinos
- House of the Baron and Viscount of Mauá
- House of the Viscount of Caeté
- Imperial Museum of Brazil
- Monastery of the Virgin
- Petrópolis City Park
- Petrópolis Wax Museum
- Quitandinha Palace
- Rio Negro Palace
- Rural touristic tours of Taquaril, Brejal and Araras
- Saint Peter of Alcantara Cathedral (Cathedral of Petrópolis) with the Imperial Mausoleum
- Valparaíso (Gastronomic and Entertainment Center of Petrópolis)
- Bauernfest (Annual Festival in honor to the German immigrants)

== Education ==
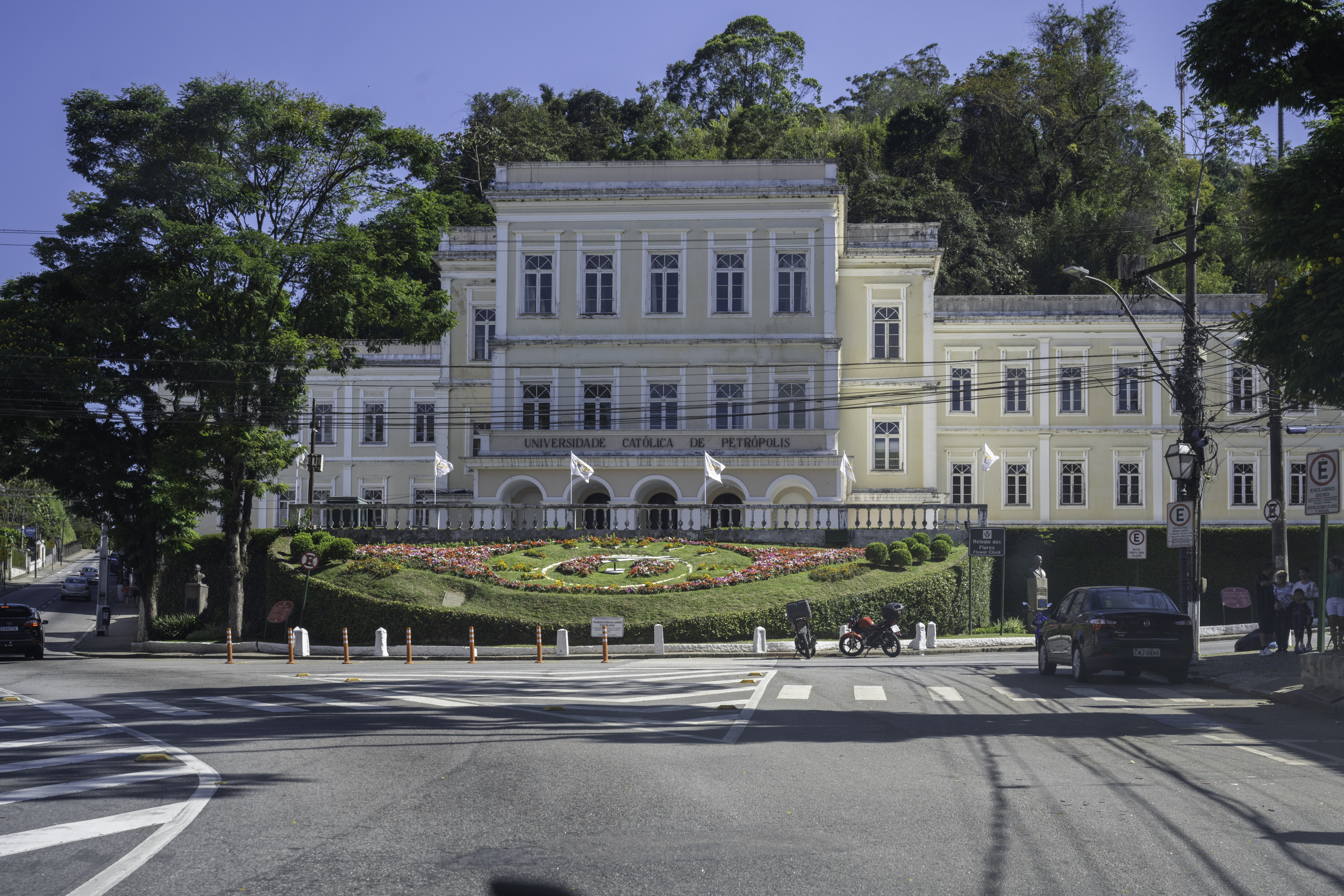
The Catholic University of Petrópolis

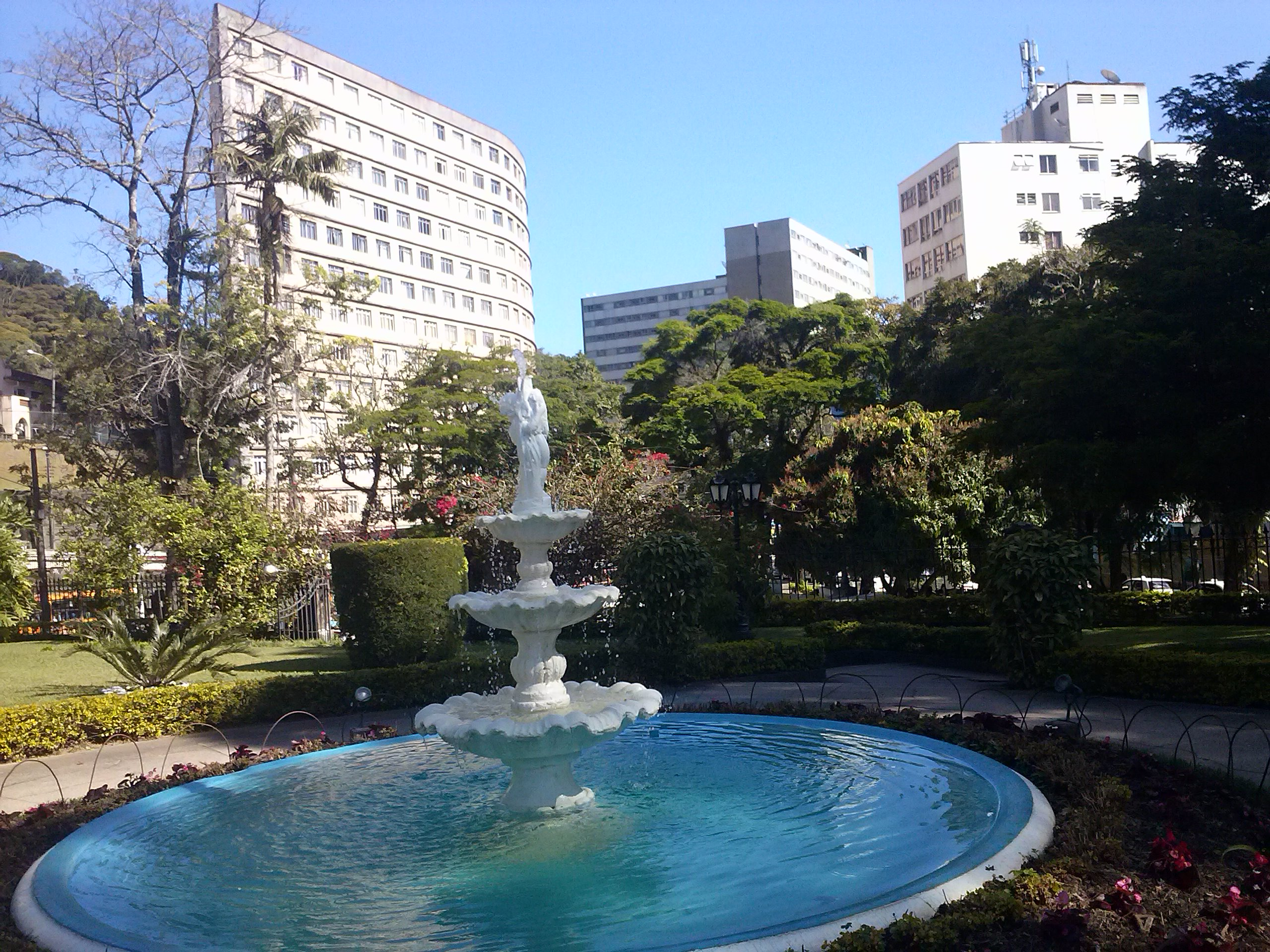
Garden of the complex of the Catholic University

Petrópolis is home to the National Laboratory of Scientific Computation (LNCC), a Brazilian institution for scientific research and technological development linked to the Ministry of Science, Technology and Innovation (MCTIC), specialized in scientific computing. The institution is home to the largest supercomputer in Latin America, called Santos Dumont. The equipment serves the Brazilian scientific community in numerous research, improvement and development demands.

The largest university in the city is the Catholic University of Petrópolis (UCP-RJ). Founded in 1953, it offers almost 30 undergraduate courses, as well as postgraduate programs. Moreover, there are two public universities, the University of the State of Rio de Janeiro (UERJ), and the Fluminense Federal University (UFF), offering Architecture and Engineering courses. In the city, there is also a unit of the Federal Center for Technological Education of Rio de Janeiro (CEFET-RJ), with courses such as Degree in Physics, Bachelor in Tourism, and Computer Engineering.

In addition to these, the city has the Petrópolis Medical School, Arthur Sá Earp Neto College, Estácio de Sá University and the Rio de Janeiro State College of Technological Education (FAETERJ), which offers courses in Information Technology and Communication, and private higher education institutions that offer several undergraduate courses and also postgraduate courses (lato sensu and stricto sensu).

In the field of basic education, the municipal education network reached the goal of the Basic Education Development Index (IDEB) for 2011 and had its mark above the averages of the state and the country.

== Transport ==
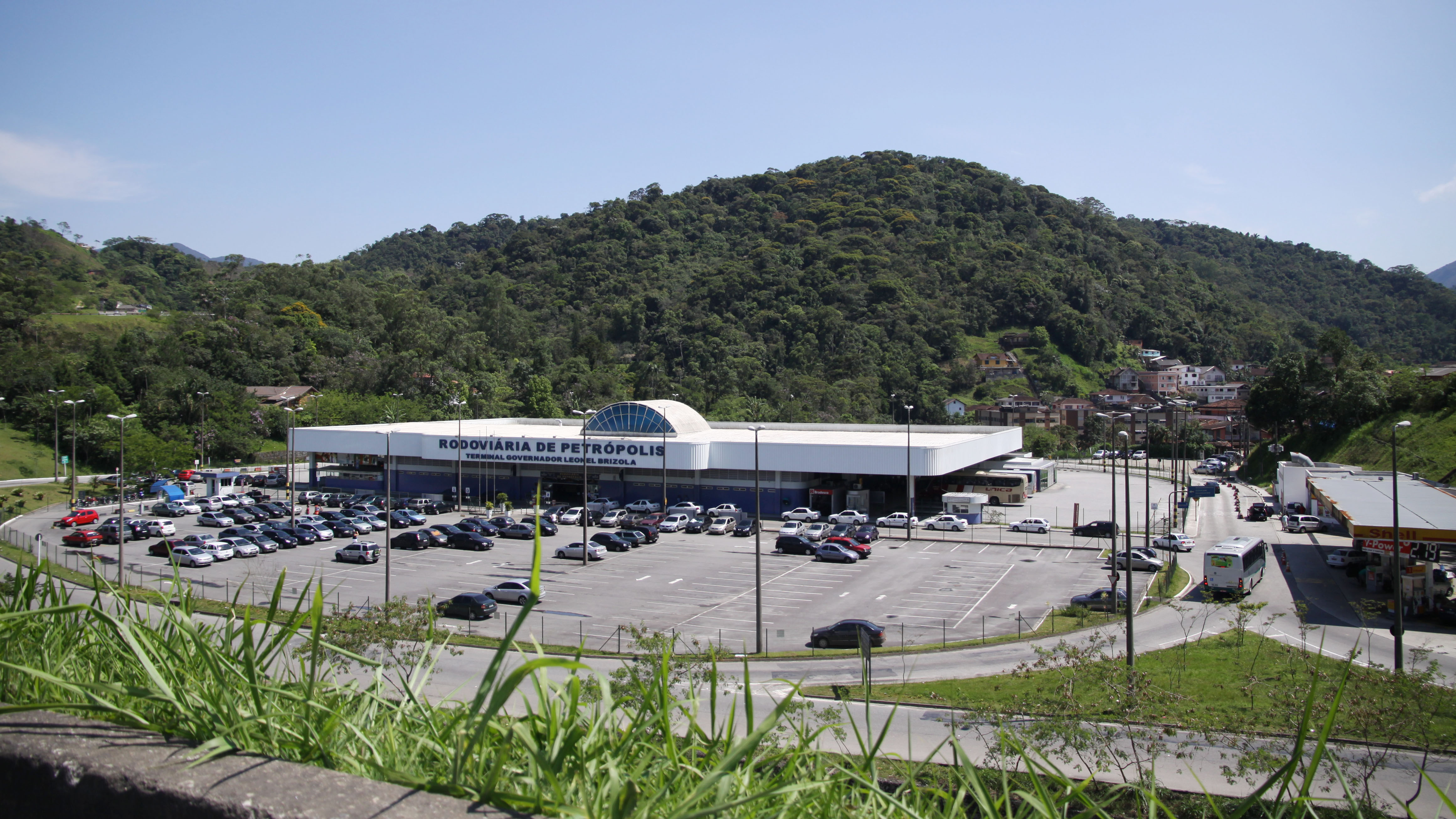
Municipal bus station of Petrópolis

Public transportation in the city is primarily provided by buses and vans. Several companies offer this service, the largest being PetroIta. According to the Brazilian Institute of Geography and Statistics (IBGE) census, in the year of 2014 the total fleet of Petrópolis had 142,576 vehicles, approximately 1 vehicle per 2.1 inhabitants.

Division of vehicles in the city
Vehicles	Number
Cars	96,384
Motorcycles	21,133
Pickup trucks	8.048
Vans	6,753
Heavy Trucks	2,769
Scooters	2,769
Utility vehicles	1,289
Buses	926
Micro-buses	680
Tractors	290
Other types of vehicles	1,232
Total	142,576

== Culture ==
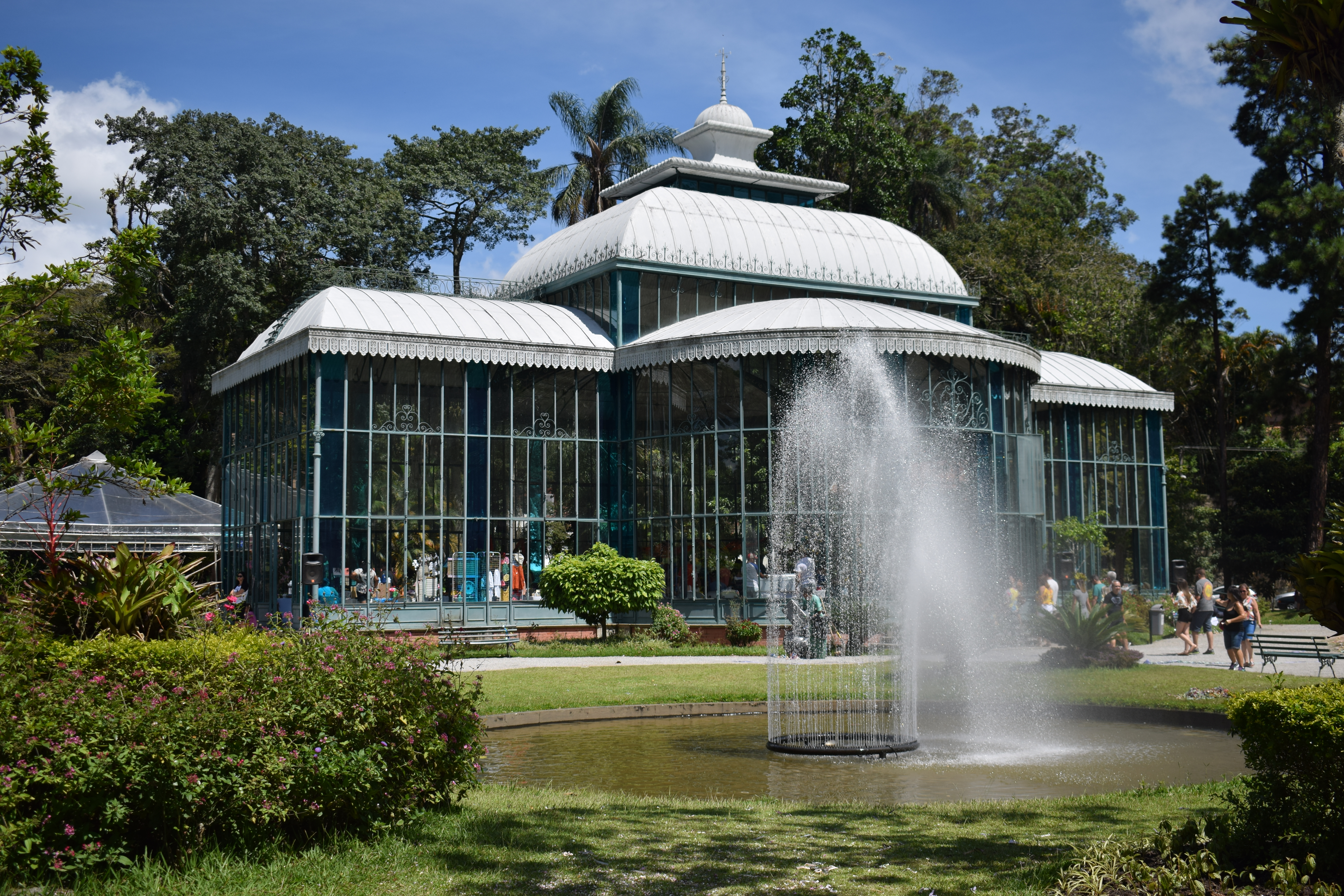
Crystal Palace

The culture of Petrópolis is directly linked to the imperial period of Brazil. Being nicknamed as Imperial City, the city has a large collection of theaters, museums, and palaces that refer to the period. In addition, much of the culture of the city was influenced by the immigration that participated in the formation of the identity of Petrópolis, where the German, Portuguese, African, Syrian, Lebanese, and Italian groups stand out. The city has the second largest festival of German culture in Brazil, the Bauernfest, behind the Oktoberfest of Blumenau, in Santa Catarina. In addition, festivals are held every year that bring back the culture of other peoples, such as the Serra Serata, in honor of Italian immigration, the Ubuntu Festival, in honor of the Afro-Brazilian legacy, and Bunka-Sai, a celebration of the Japanese culture. The Cultural Foundation of Petrópolis promotes every year (since 2009) the Maestro Guerra-Peixe Cultural Prize, which honors the most outstanding artists and cultural agents during the year. César Guerra-Peixe was an illustrious composer of the city.

=== Architecture ===
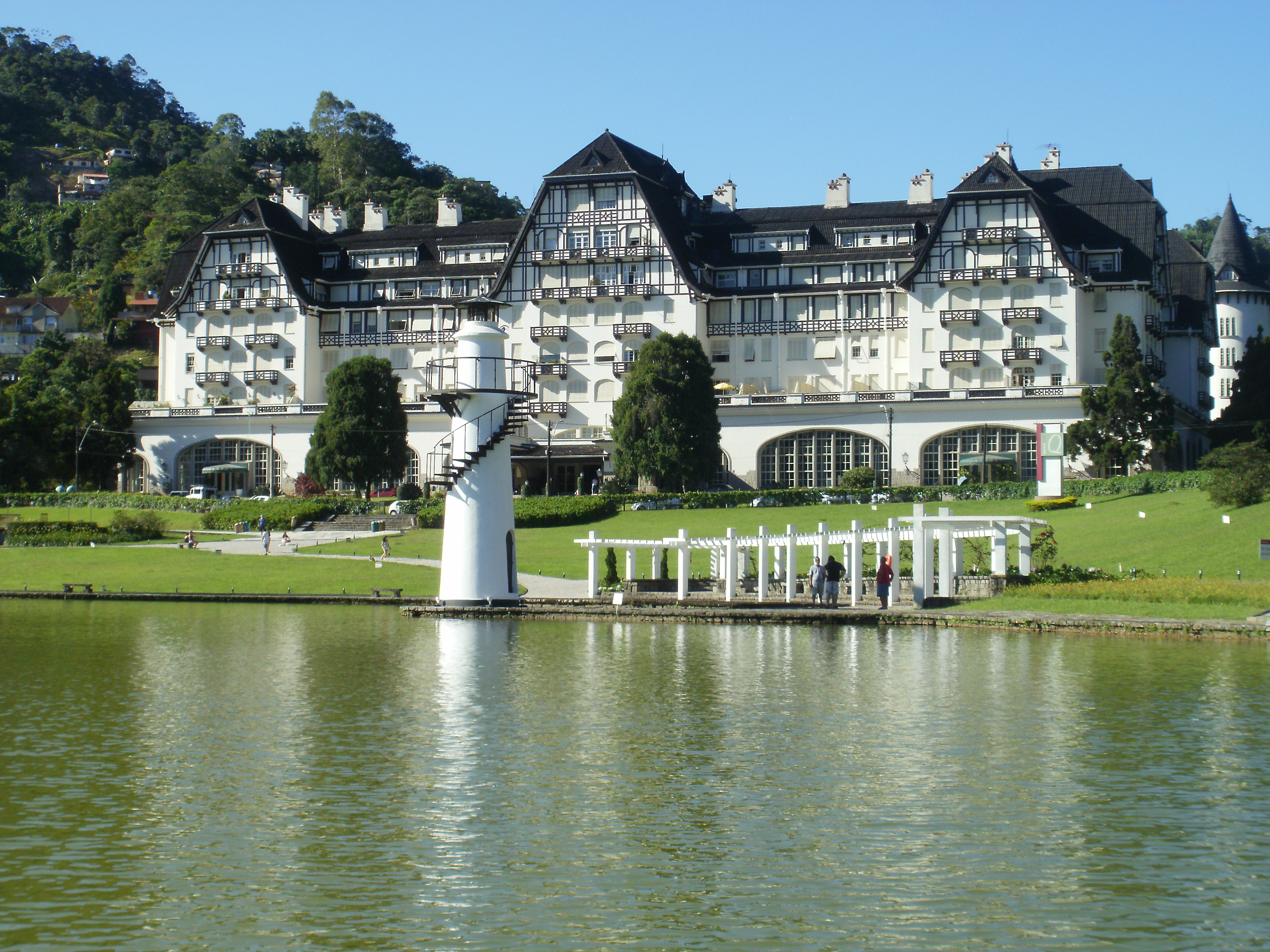
The hotel and former casino Palácio Quitandinha

The city has unique architecture, such as the Palácio Quitandinha, the Petropolitan Academy of Letters, the House Museum of Santos Dumont, the Imperial Museum of Brazil, the Dom Pedro Theater, the Casa do Colono Museum, and the Cathedral of Saint Peter of Alcantara. The palace is the main building of the so-called "historic center", where Koeler Avenue stands out, surrounded by mansions and palaces of the 19th century. The road is perpendicular to the facade of the Cathedral of Saint Peter of Alcantara and, in the other direction, the Ruy Barbosa Square and the façade of the Catholic University.

In the so-called "historic center", there are also buildings such as "Encantada" (summer house of Santos Dumont); the Crystal Palace; the Yellow Palace (City Council); the Rio Negro Palace, bordering the city hall (Sérgio Fadel Palace); and curious buildings such as the "castelinho" of the self-proclaimed "Duke of Belfort", on the corner of Koeler and Ruy Barbosa Square, or the old house of the Rocha Miranda family, on Avenida Ipiranga – same address of another residence of the same family, in a sixties style. Modern lines are also present in the house of Lúcio Costa, in the neighborhood of Samambaia.

=== Theatres ===
Petrópolis has 2 theaters. The Teatro Dom Pedro, created in Art Deco style and inaugurated in 1933 by D'Angelo & Cia, is one of the largest in the state. The place was created with different styles, with mythological and futuristic references, making the theater considered an eclectic style, becoming a cultural and artistic reference for Petrópolis. The city also owns the Teatro Santa Cecília, built in 1955, located in Rua Aureliano Coutinho in the center of the city.

=== Museums ===
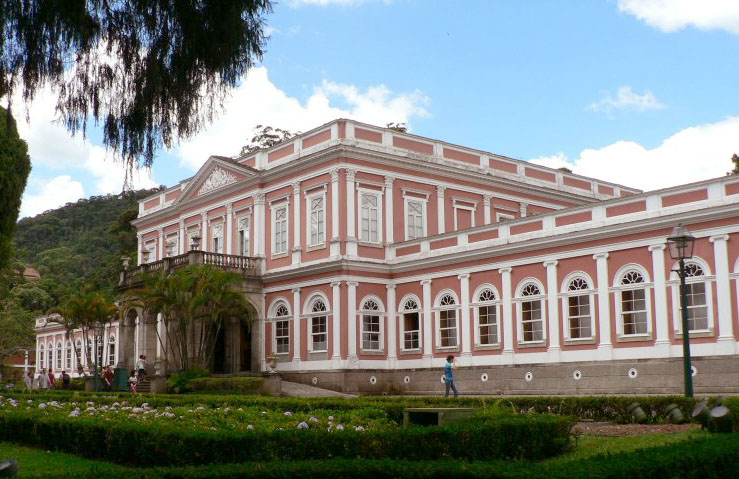
Imperial Museum of Brazil, the most visited museum in Brazil

Petrópolis has great traditions as an imperial city. For this reason, today it owns one of the most important museums of the history of Brazil, the Imperial Museum. Built between 1845 and 1862 as the summer Palace of the Imperial Family, it has a collection of pieces linked to the Brazilian monarchy, including furniture, documents, works of art, and personal objects belonging to the Imperial Family. The Palace was turned into a museum in 1943 by decree of the then president Getúlio Vargas. In addition, the city has the Petrópolis Wax Museum, Casa Santos Dumont Museum, Casa do Colono Museum, Princess Isabel House, and Rio Negro Palace, all located in the city center.

With more than 321,000 visitors, the Imperial Museum in Petrópolis was the most visited museum in Brazil in 2016, according to data from the Brazilian Institute of Museums (Ibram) of the Ministry of Culture.

=== Festivals ===
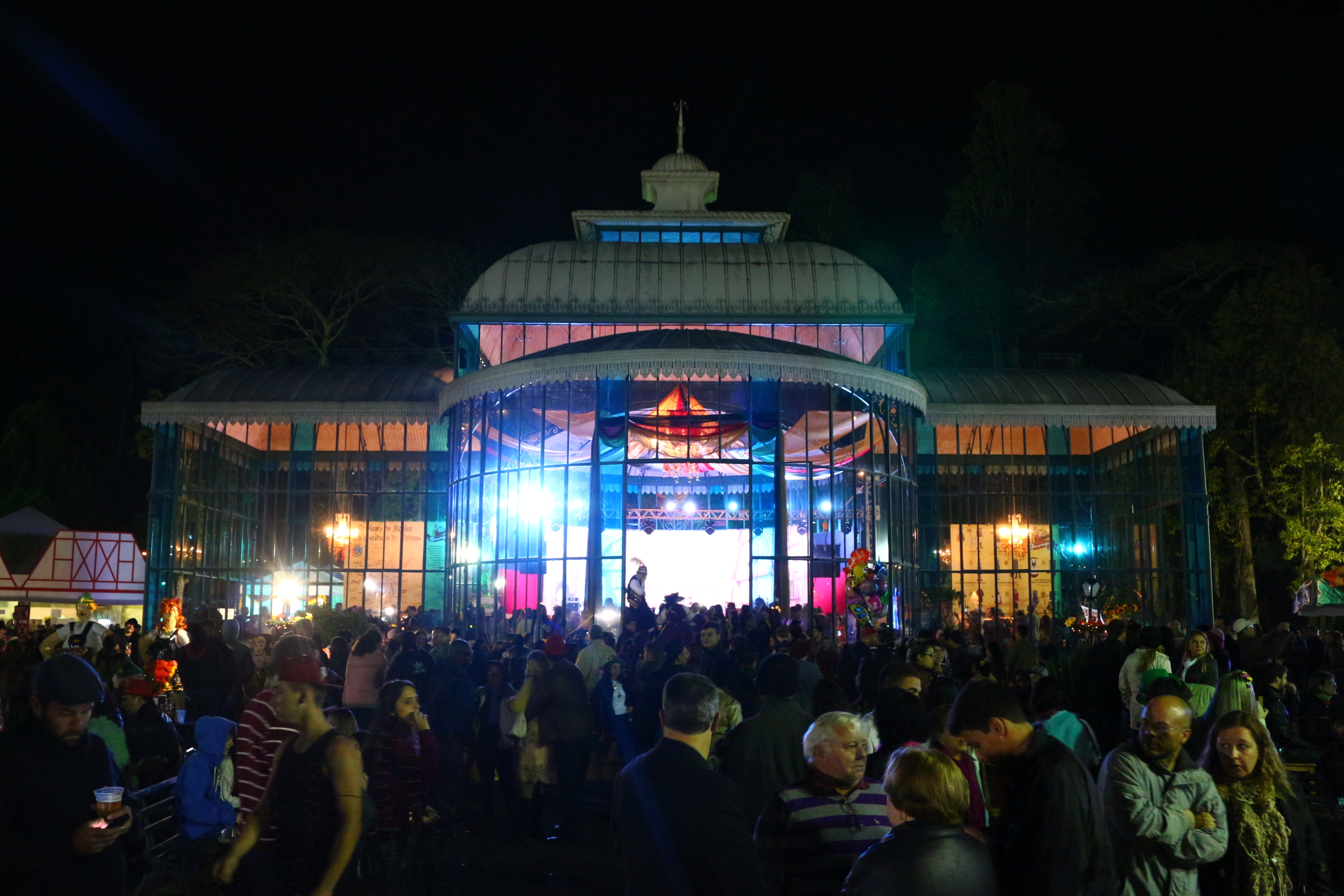
The Crystal Palace during Bauernfest

The Petrópolis culture is directly linked to German immigration. Since 1989, Bauernfest, a typical feast in honor of German immigrants, is held every year. The festival in 2012 lasted 11 days, had the participation of 368,000 visitors, and raised R$55 million. The festival welcomes foreign tourists from all over Brazil, especially from the city of Rio de Janeiro. It is the most influential party of the city and includes competitions of chope the meter, presentations, typical cuisine, exhibition of chocolates, among other attractions.

The city also holds the Serra Serata, an annual festival that celebrates immigration and Italian culture.

Petrópolis also hosts the Winter Festival, promoted by SESC, with several attractions for this period of the year, which usually happens in the Quitandinha Palace. The festival is already traditional in the cities of Petrópolis, Nova Friburgo, and Teresópolis. In 2014, the 13th edition was held, counting on concerts, theatrical presentations, and cultural events.

The city also hosts Bunka-Sai, the annual festival of Japanese culture, which had its first edition in 2009. It has cultural presentations, in addition to the Japanese gastronomic festival.

=== Carnival ===
In 2013, the carnival of the city was canceled, for the application of funds in the approximate amount of R$1 million, previously used in the parades, in the area of health, thus making Petrópolis a refuge of Cariocas of the Carnival. The decision was made during a meeting between the mayor and the Foundation for Culture and Tourism.

== Sports ==
Petrópolis is recognized as one of the largest mountain bike hubs in the world. In 2022, the city hosted one of the stages of the Union Cycliste Internationale (UCI) Mountain Bike World Cup, after 17 years without the competition being held in Brazil. In 2023, the city hosted the Giants Challenge, an international event that served as a points tally for athletes aiming to qualify for the Mountain Bike competition at the Olympic Games. Henrique Avancini, from Petrópolis, was the first Brazilian in history to assume the top spot in the Mountain Bike World Ranking, putting the country on the sport's scene. Avancini is also a two-time champion in the Mountain Bike Marathon (XCM). He represented Brazil at the 2020 Summer Olympics, in Tokyo.

Serrano Football Club, the oldest soccer club in the city, was founded on1915 and was Garrincha's first professional team.

== Media ==
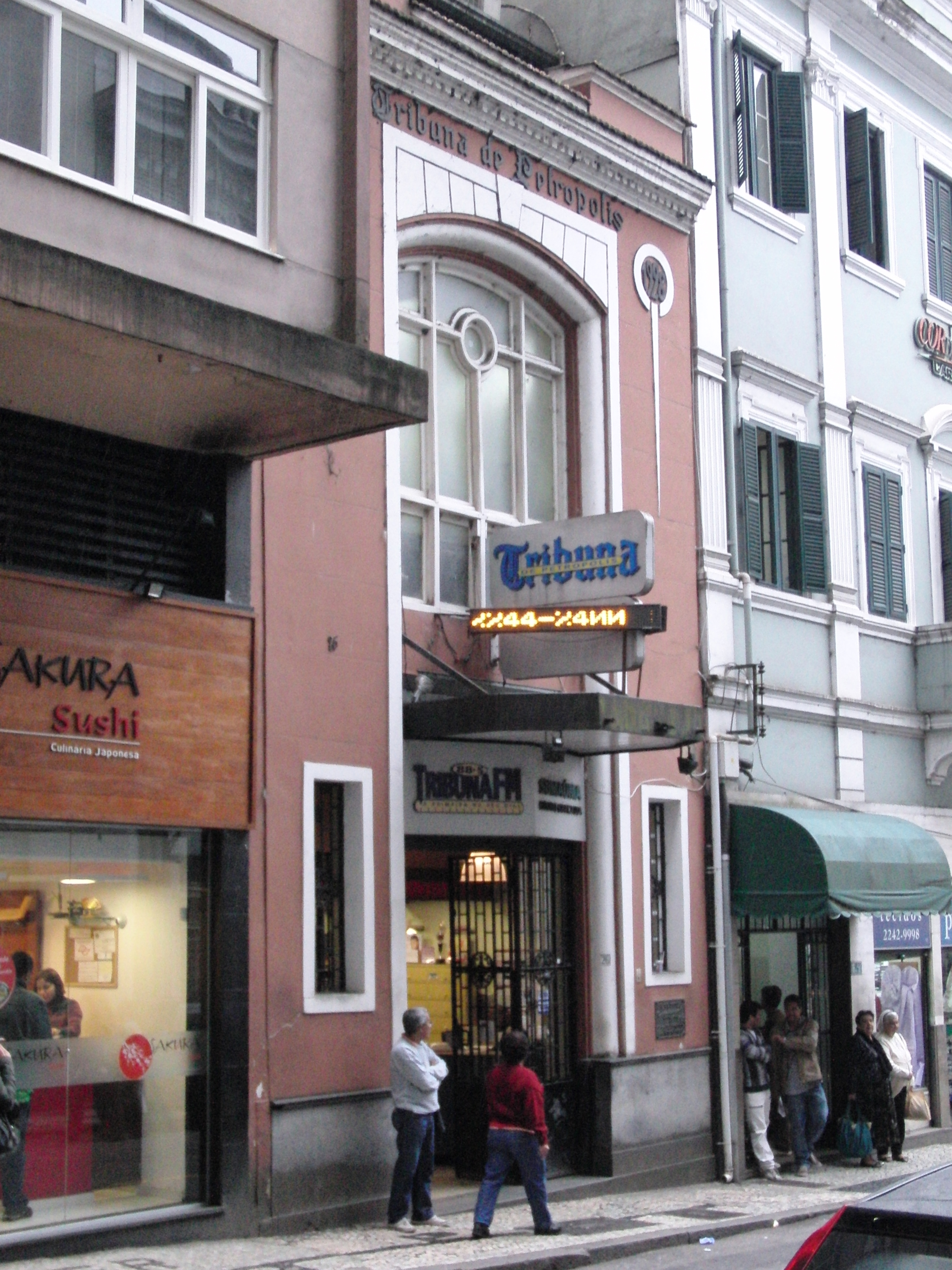
Tribuna de Petrópolis headquarters

The city's main written newspaper is the Tribuna de Petrópolis, one of the oldest in the country, created in 1909, published from Tuesday to Sunday, whose headquarters are in the center. Also worthy of note is the newspaper Diário de Petrópolis, published daily, of great influence in the city.

The main television station transmitting news related to the city is InterTV Serra + Mar, a division of Rede Globo, as well as other local broadcasters such as SBT Rio and Band Rio, which present news from the Fluminense Mountain Region of Rio de Janeiro, mainly related to Petrópolis and Nova Friburgo. The city also has local television networks with a certain influence: Rede Petrópolis de Televisão (RPT), TV Vila Imperial, and TV Cidade de Petrópolis, with headquarters located in the center.

The most listened radio stations with headquarters in Petrópolis are Radio Tribuna FM (88.5 MHz), Radio UCP (106.3 MHz), Radio Supernova FM (98.7 MHz), and Radio Imperial (1550 AM). In addition, radio stations based in the city of Rio de Janeiro, such as the MIX FM Rio Radio, are also much listened to.

In recent years, the internet has emerged as the main mechanism for news consumption. In Petrópolis, some important news portals includes the G1 Portal of the Fluminense Mountain Region, the online portal of the Tribuna de Petrópolis, and the Diário de Petrópolis website and social media.

== Sister cities ==
Petrópolis is twinned with:

- Blumenau, Brazil
- Orleans, Brazil

== Notable people ==
- Dom Pedro de Alcântara, Prince of Grão-Pará
- Peter Brian Medawar, winner of the Nobel Prize in Physiology or Medicine, among other awards
- Stefan Zweig, Austrian author, lived in Petrópolis from 1940 until his suicide in the same city on February 23, 1942
- Rodrigo Santoro, actor who has appeared in many successful movies, including 300, What to Expect When You're Expecting, among others
- Prince Luís of Orléans-Braganza
- Rafael da Silva, Olympique Lyonnais footballer
- Carlos Gracie, Brazilian martial artist
- Hélio Gracie, Brazilian martial artist
- Michel de Souza, operatic baritone, born in Petrópolis
- Guilherme Fontes, Brazilian actor
- Edwin V. Morgan, United States Ambassador to Brazil 1912–1933
- Fiorella Mattheis, Brazilian actress
- Henrique Avancini, Brazilian mountain bike racer
- Magda Tagliaferro, Brazilian pianist
- Gabriel Pec, Brazilian footballer
- Elizabeth Bishop, American poet and short-story writer, lived partly in Petrópolis for 17 years (1944–1961) with Lota de Macedo Soares, architect and landscape designer
- Cristiane Brasil, Brazilian politician, was born in Petrópolis
- Jorge Henrique Papf, a German-Brazilian photographer and painter
- Andreas Mattheis, Brazilian racing driver
- All but one of the members of the comedy troupe Hermes & Renato were born in Petrópolis

Petrópolis is also the home of Meninas Cantoras de Petrópolis, an all-girl singing group.

== Gallery ==
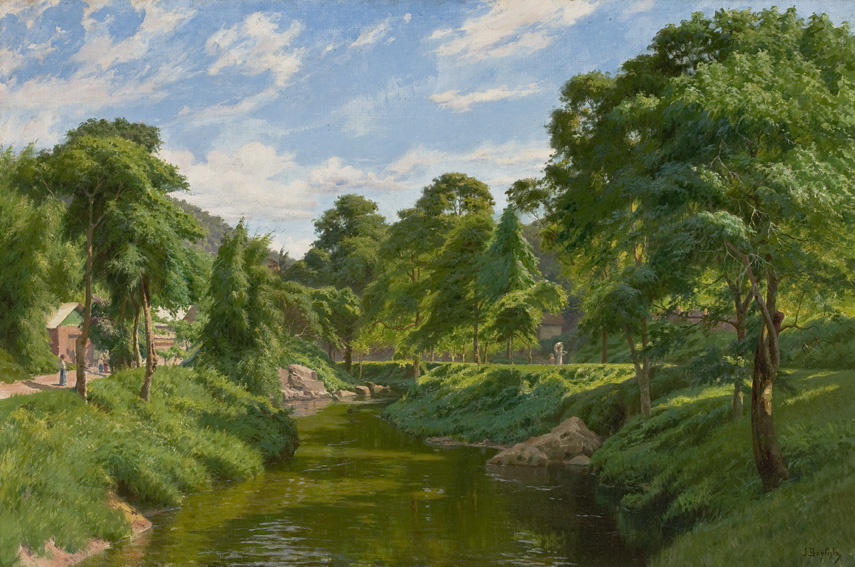
Landscape of Petrópolis (Woodland with a Creek), unknown date

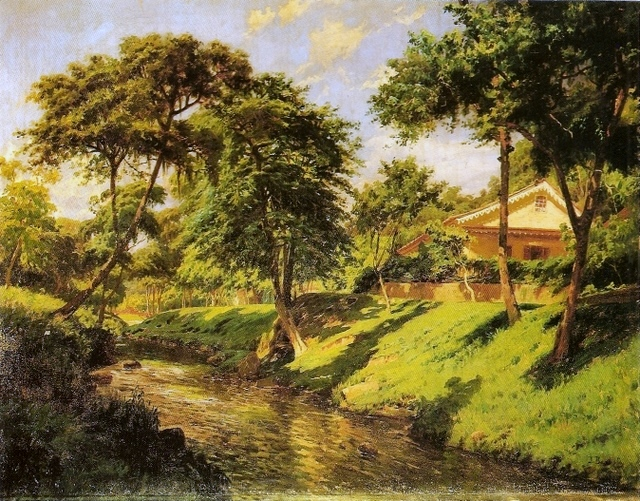
Baron of Rio Branco's house

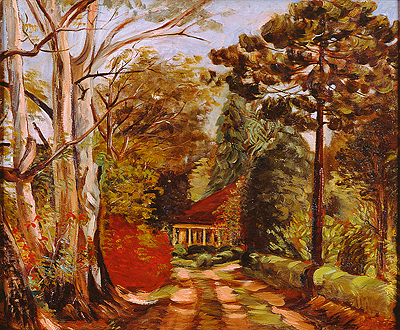
Landscape of Petrópolis, unknown date

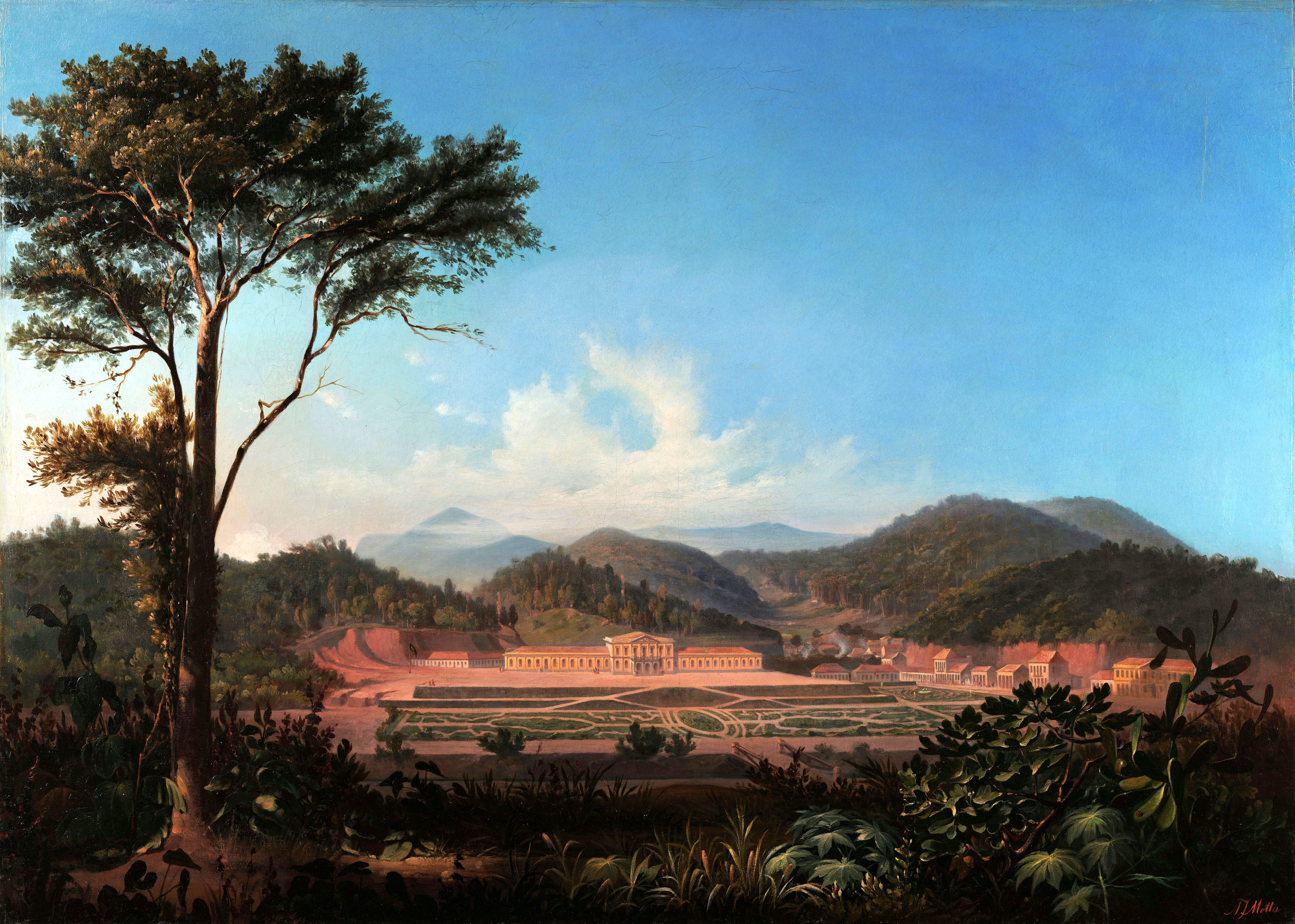
Imperial Palace of Petrópolis, circa 1855

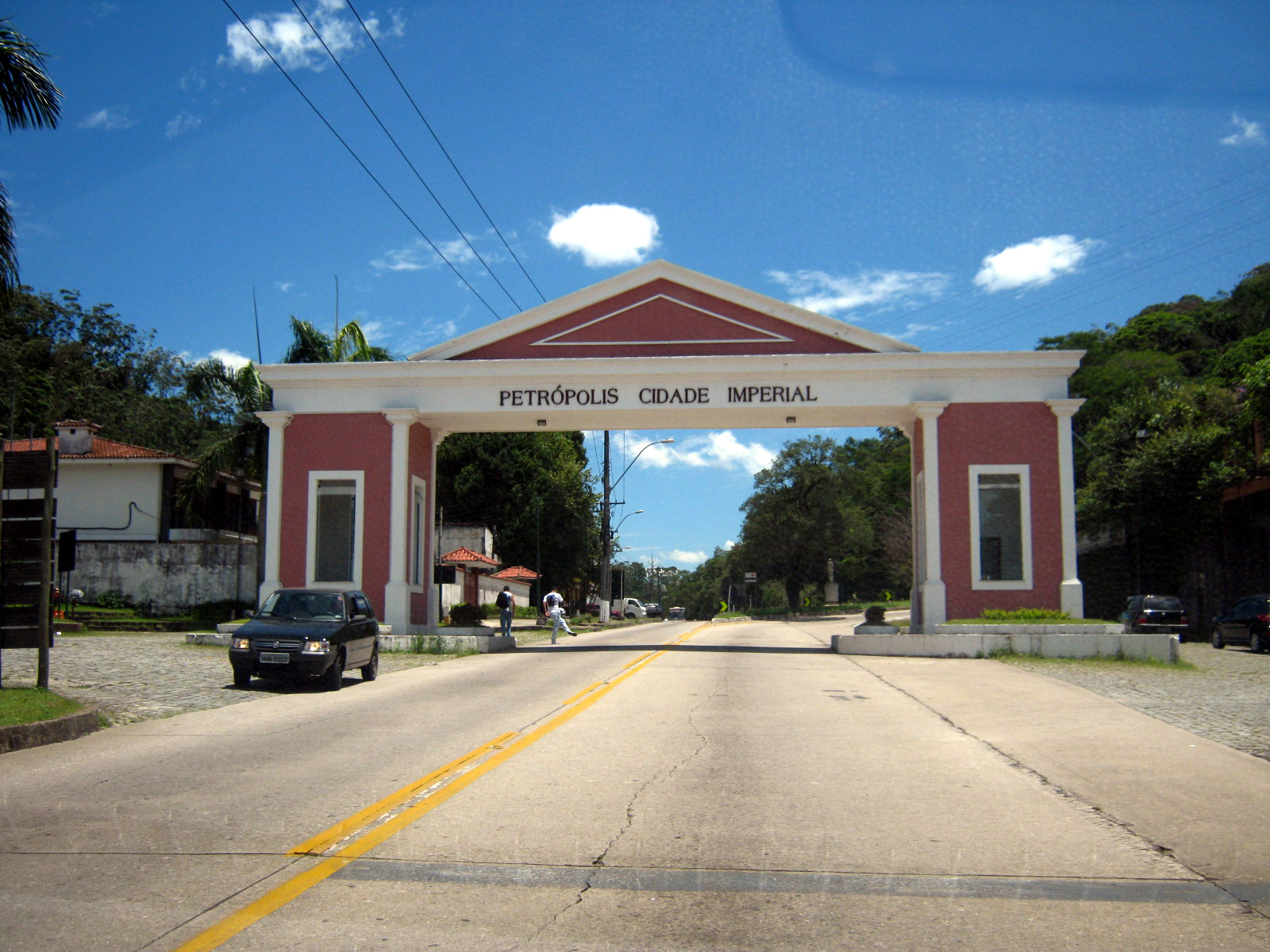
City entrance

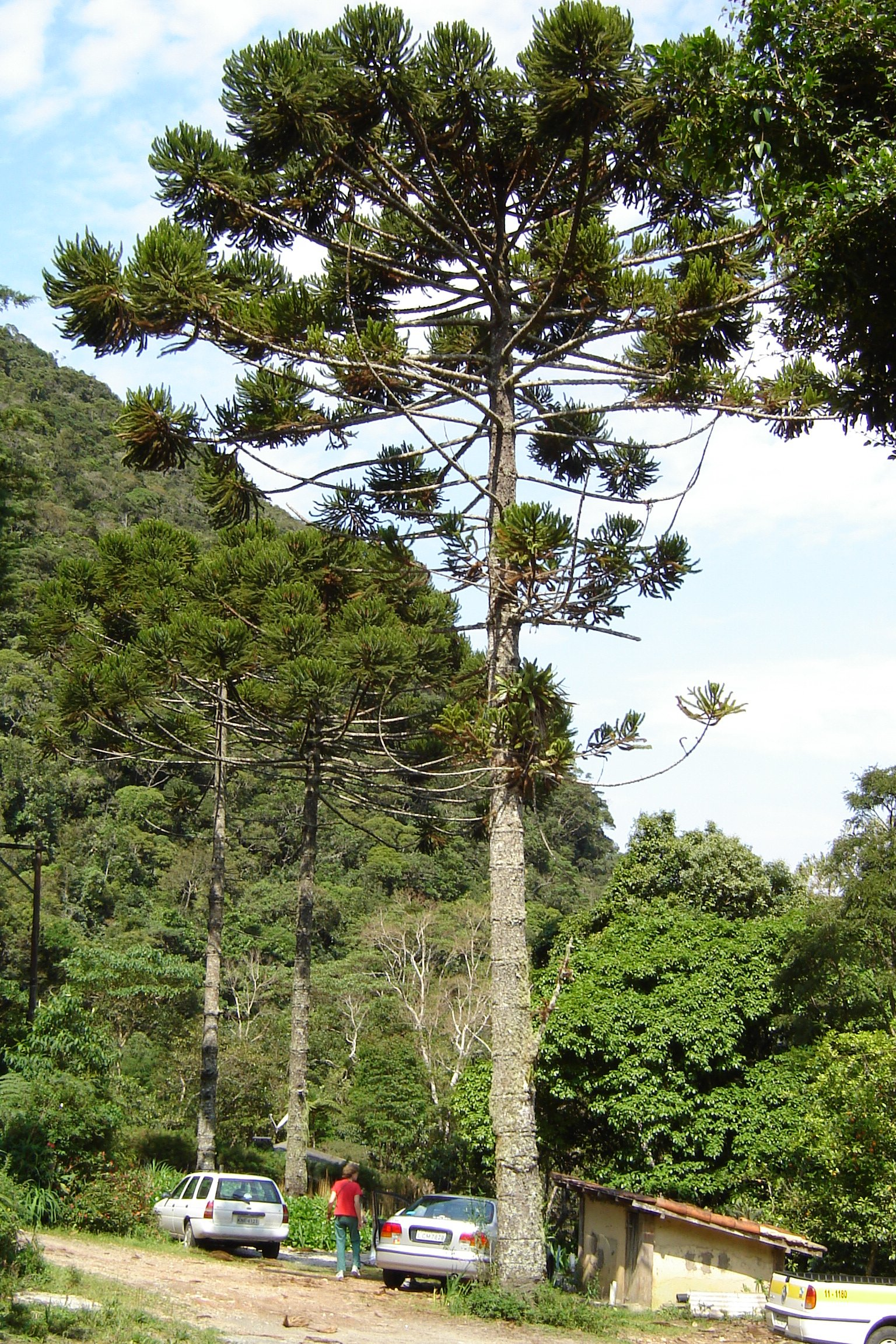
Araucaria angustifolia, Brazilian pine

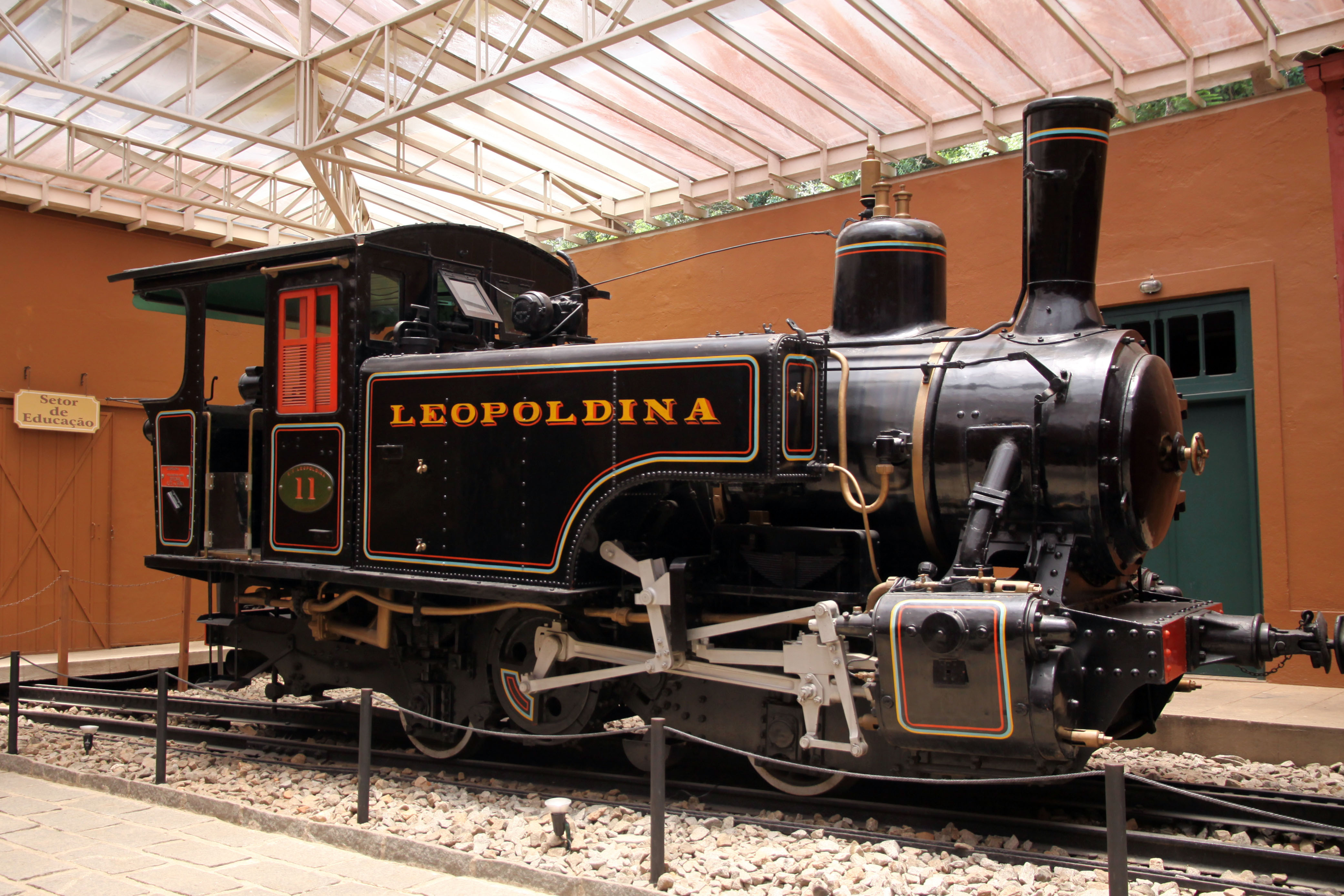
The railway engine 11 was used on the railway line that, during the period 1883–1964, ran between Rio de Janeiro and Petrópolis.

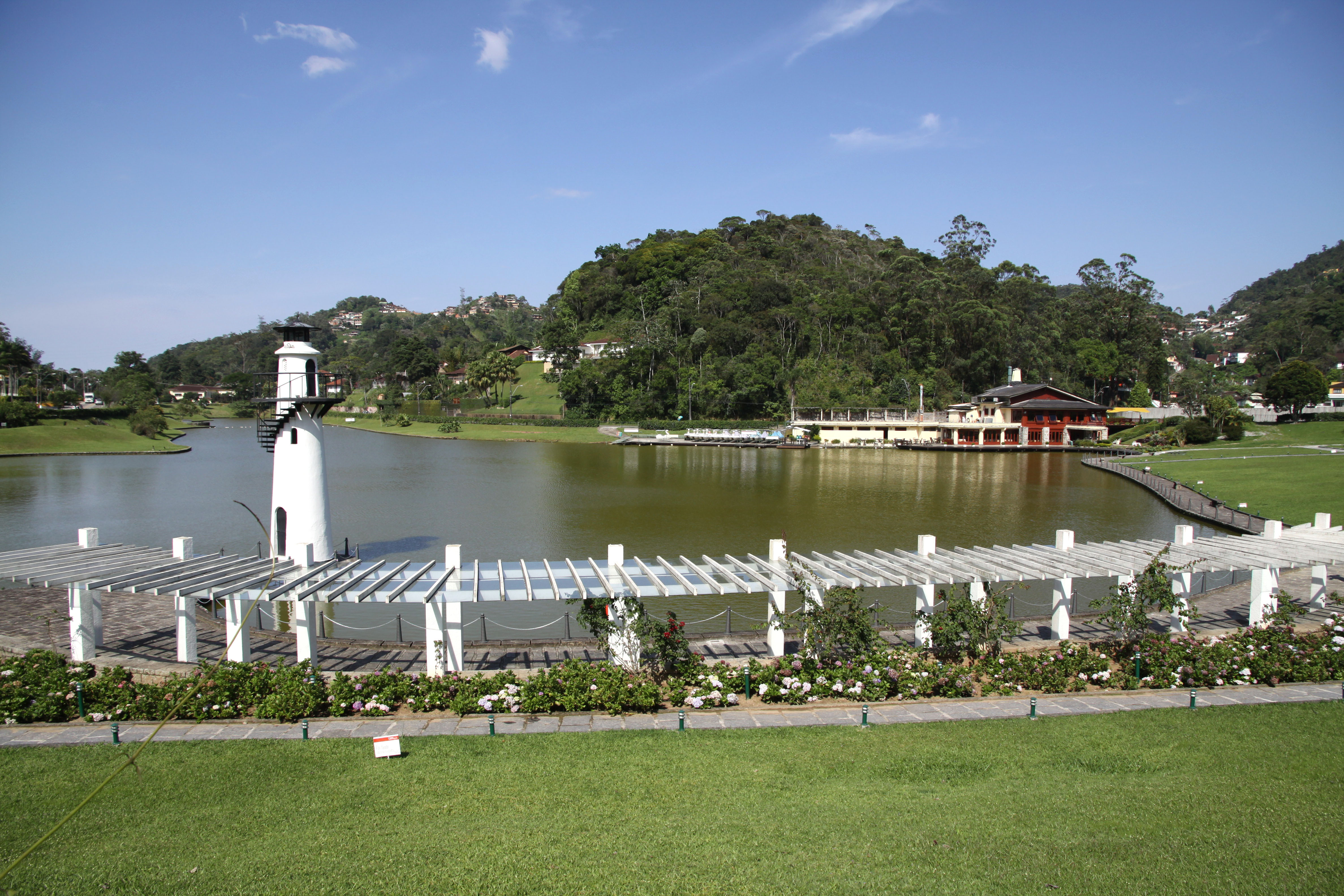
Lake Quitandinha

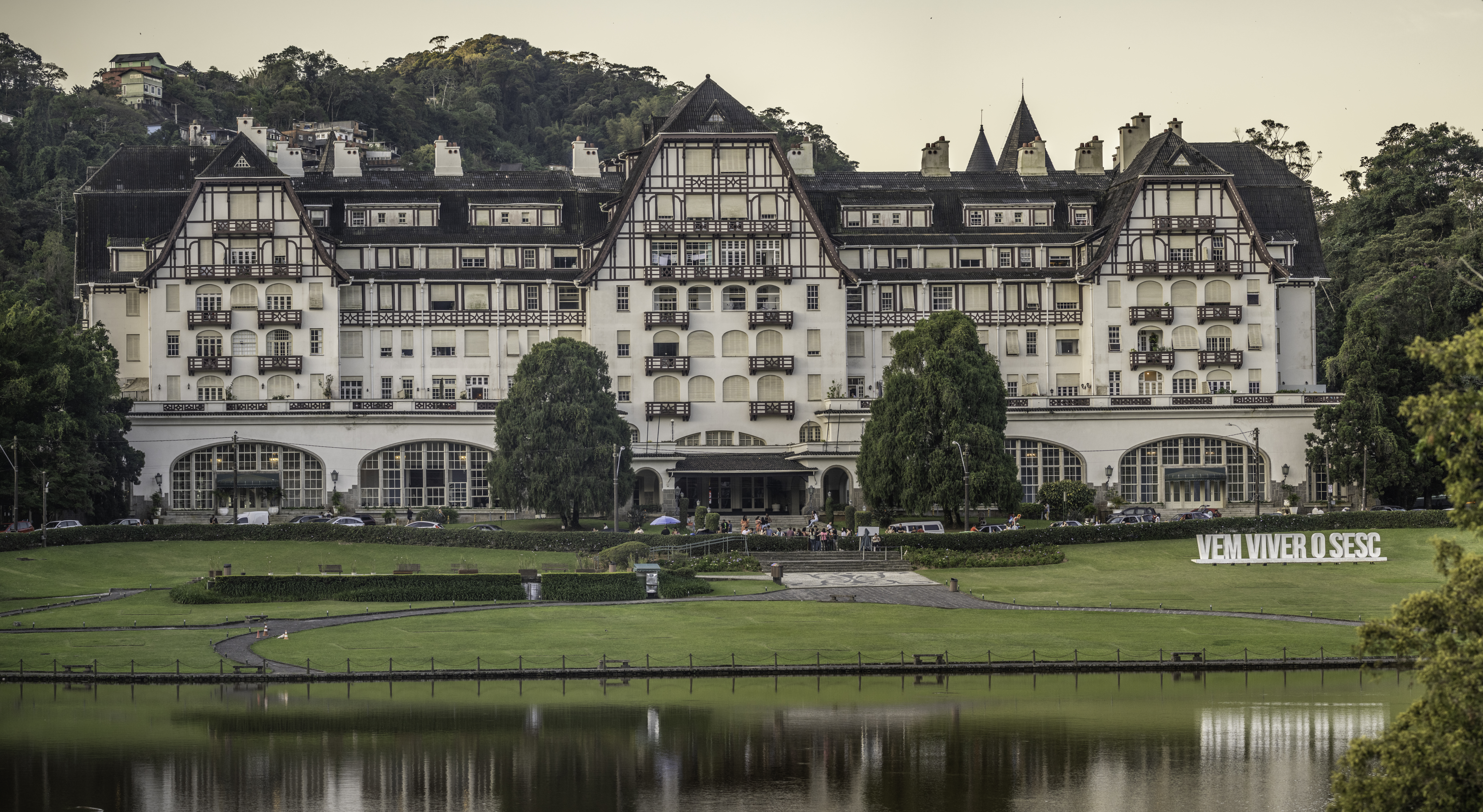
Quitandinha Palace

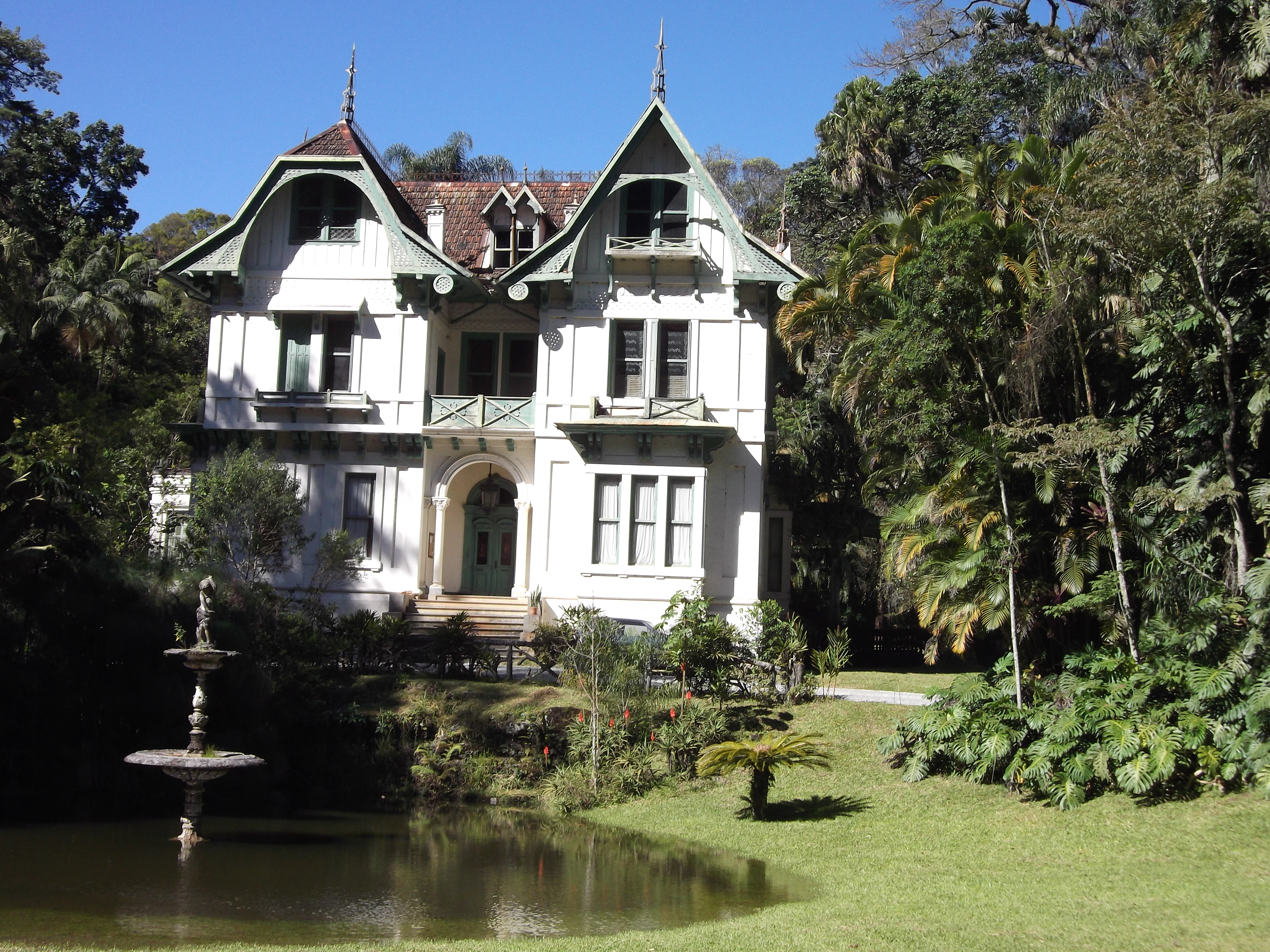
House of Ipiranga ("House of the Seven Mistakes")

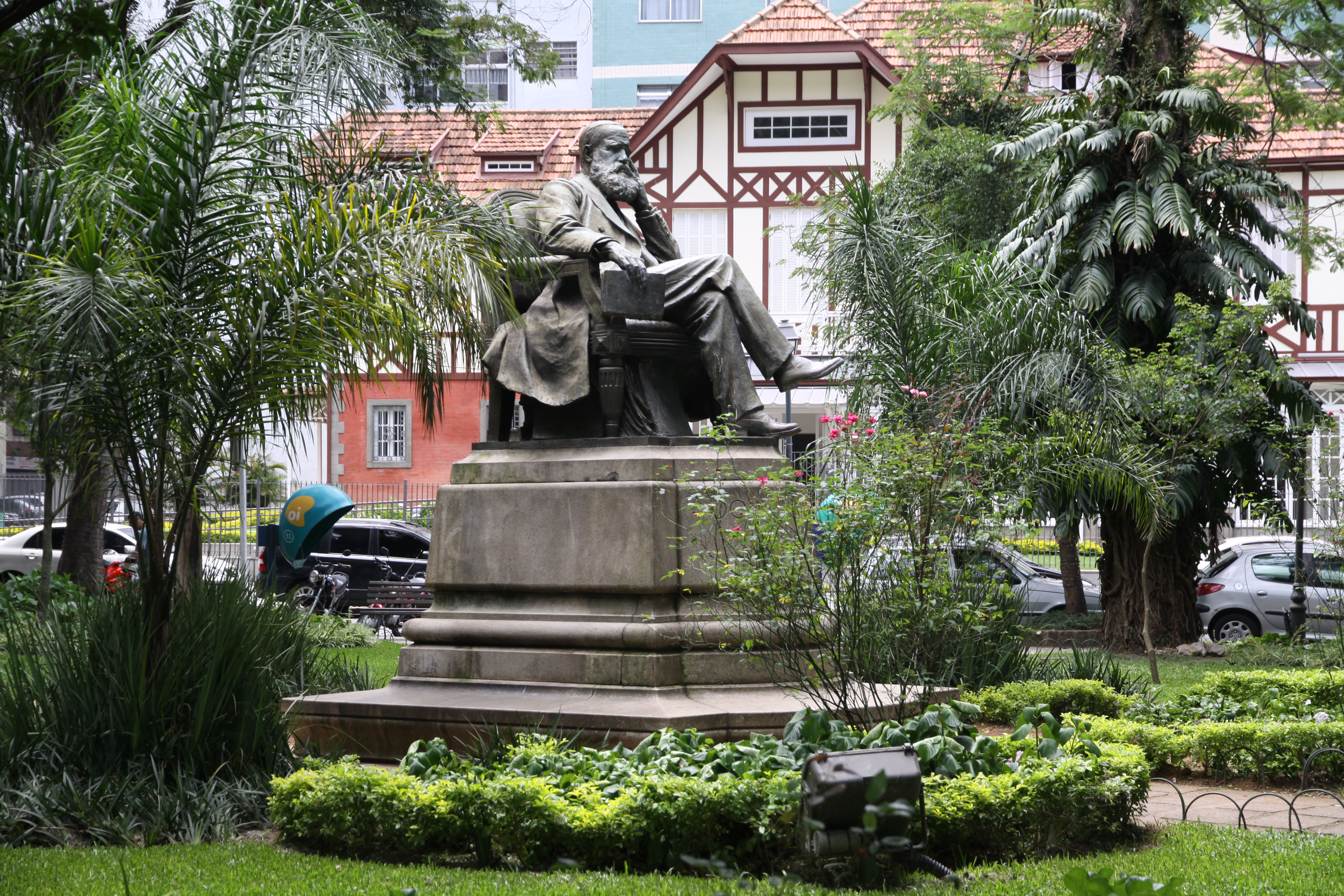
Monument to Emperor Pedro II in the garden at the square which bears his name

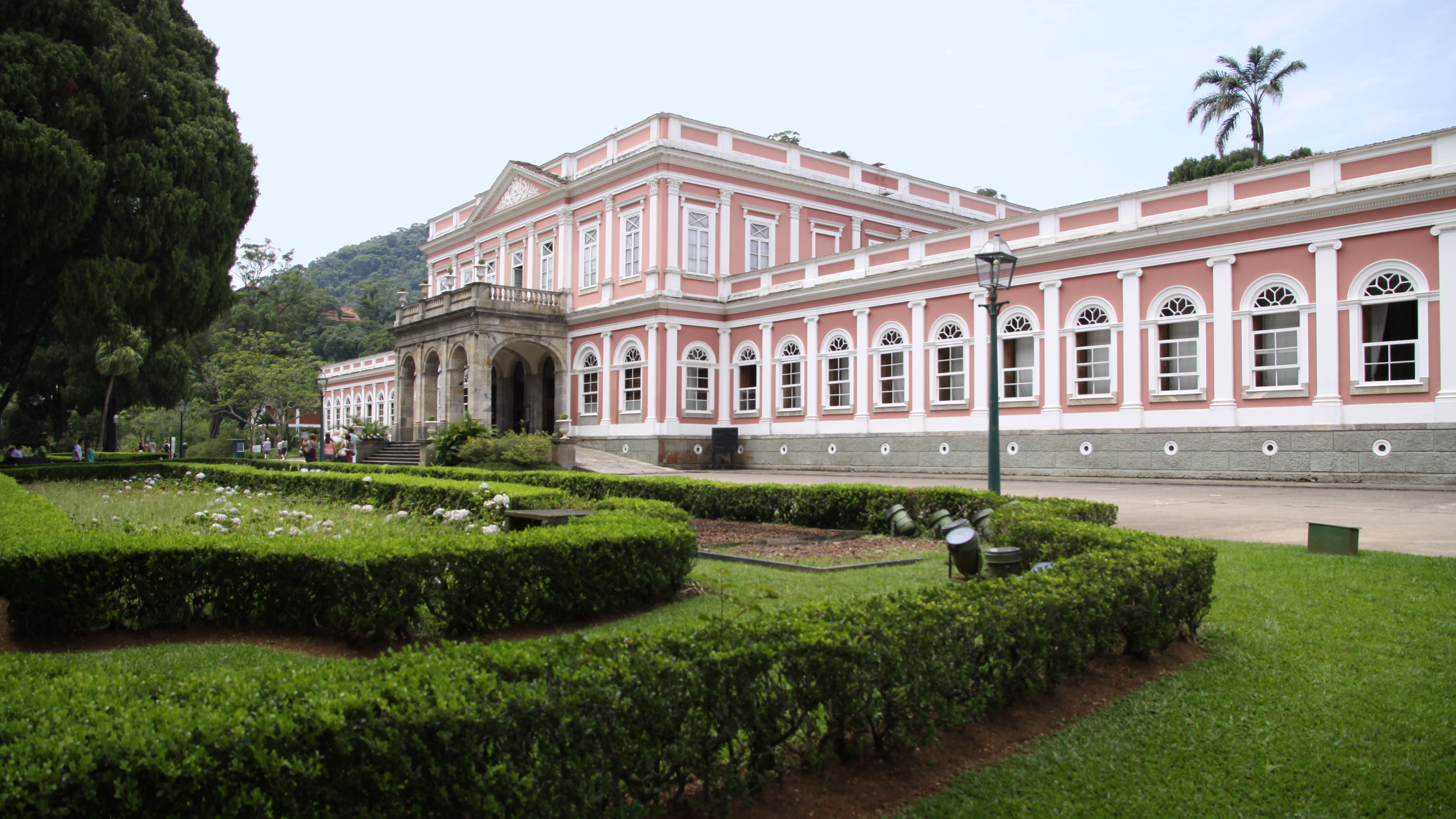
Imperial Museum

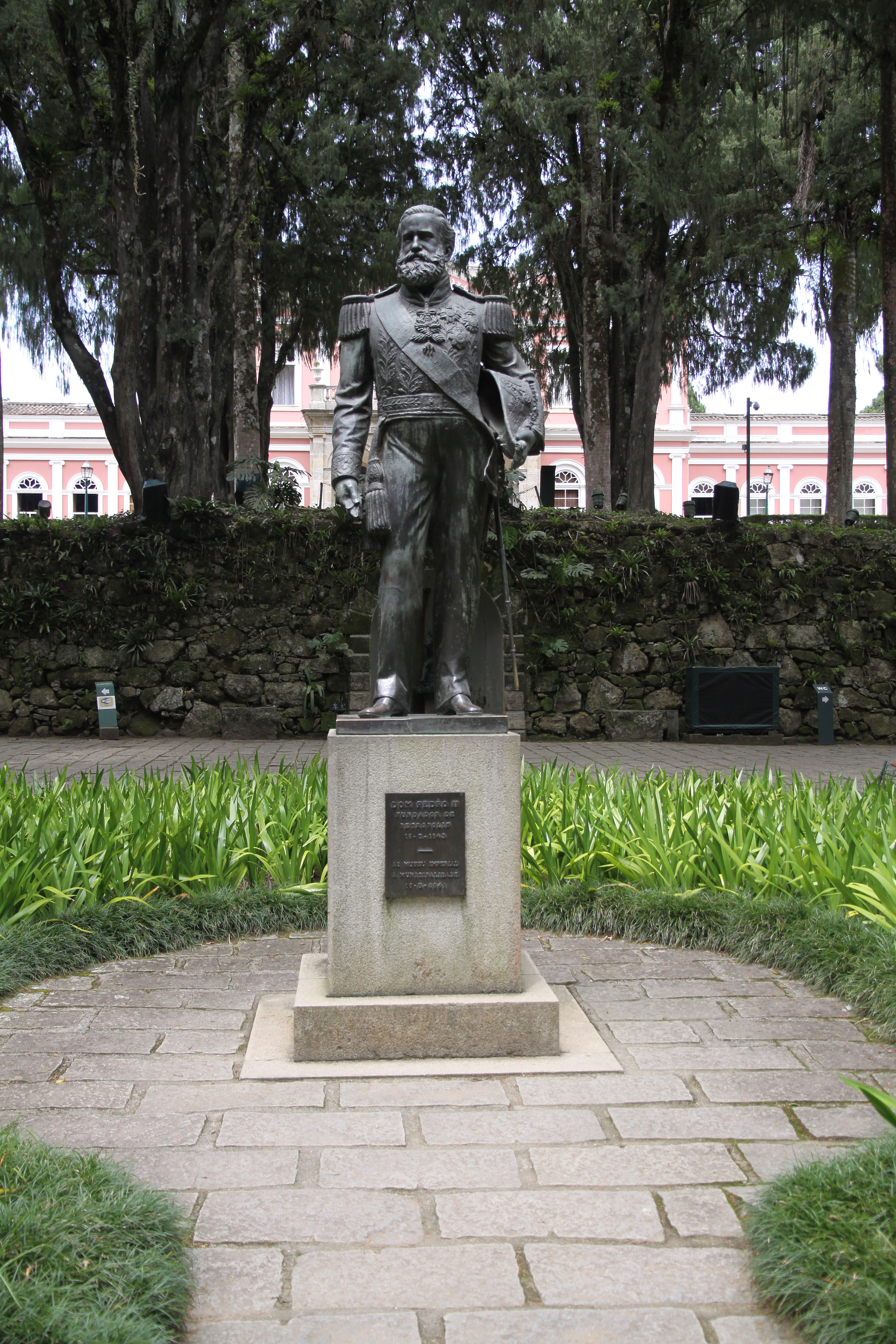
Statue of Pedro II at the Imperial Museum

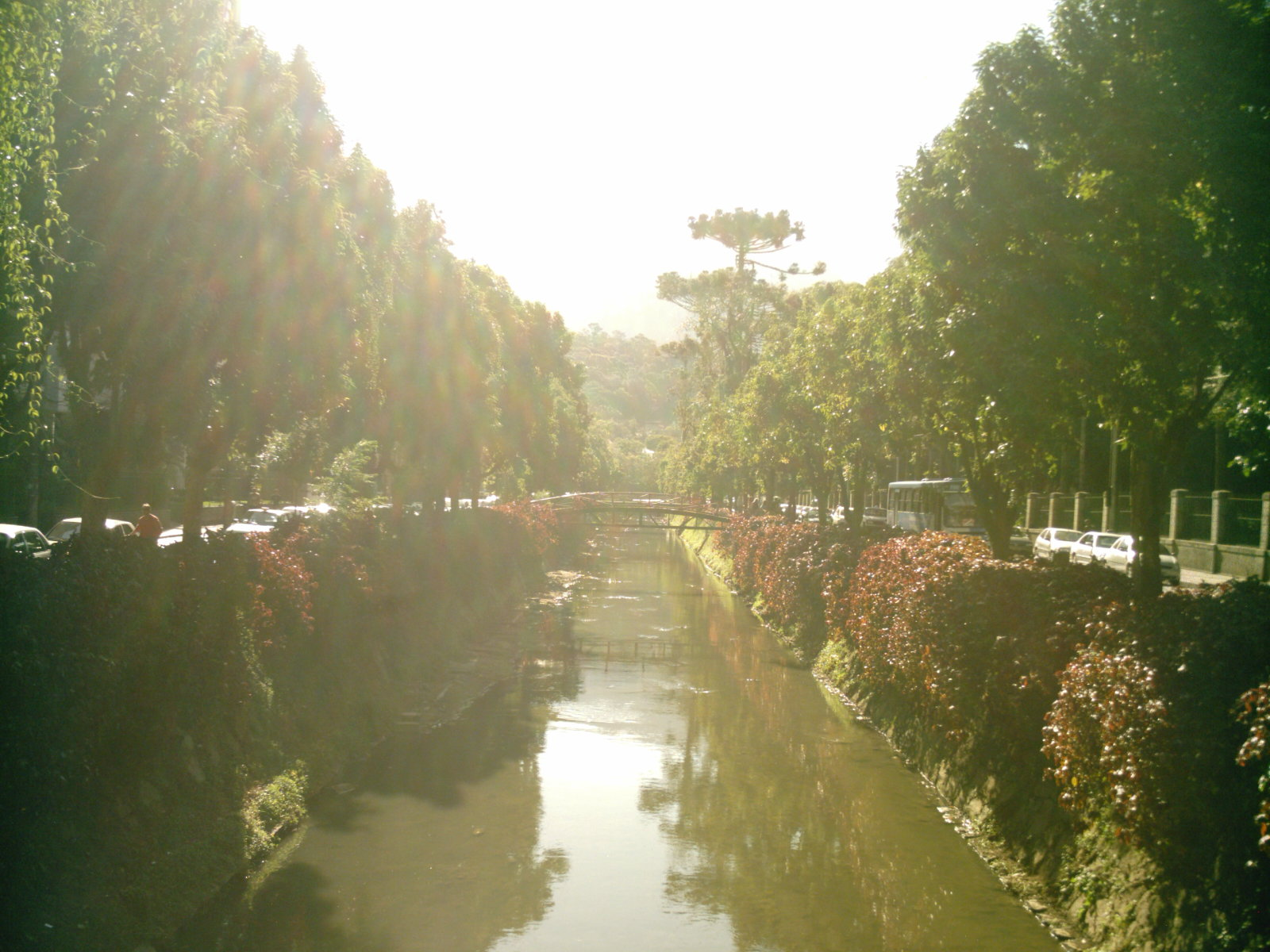
Landscape of Petrópolis, in front of the Imperial Museum

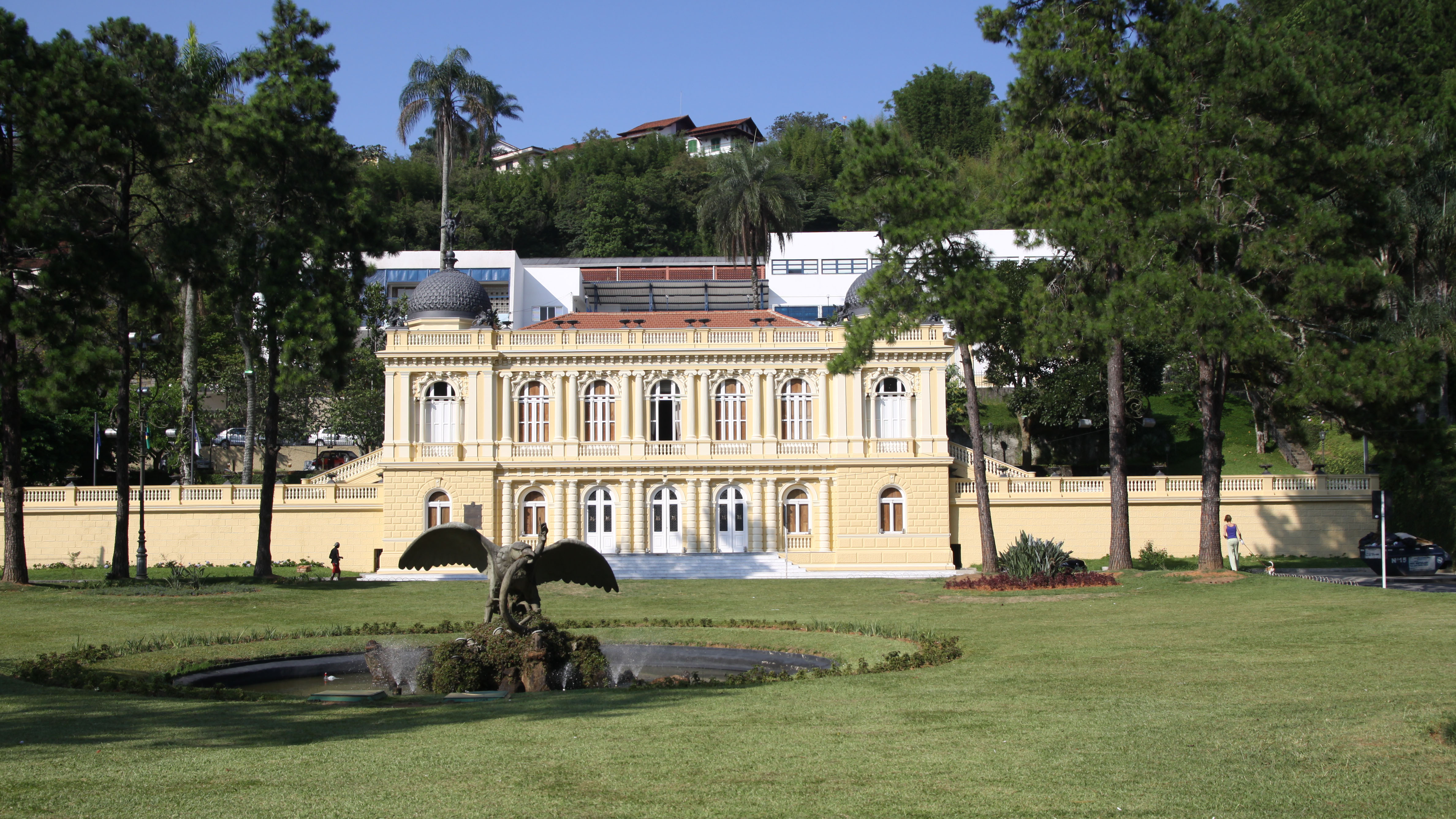
Palácio Amarelo (Yellow Palace), the City Council of Petrópolis

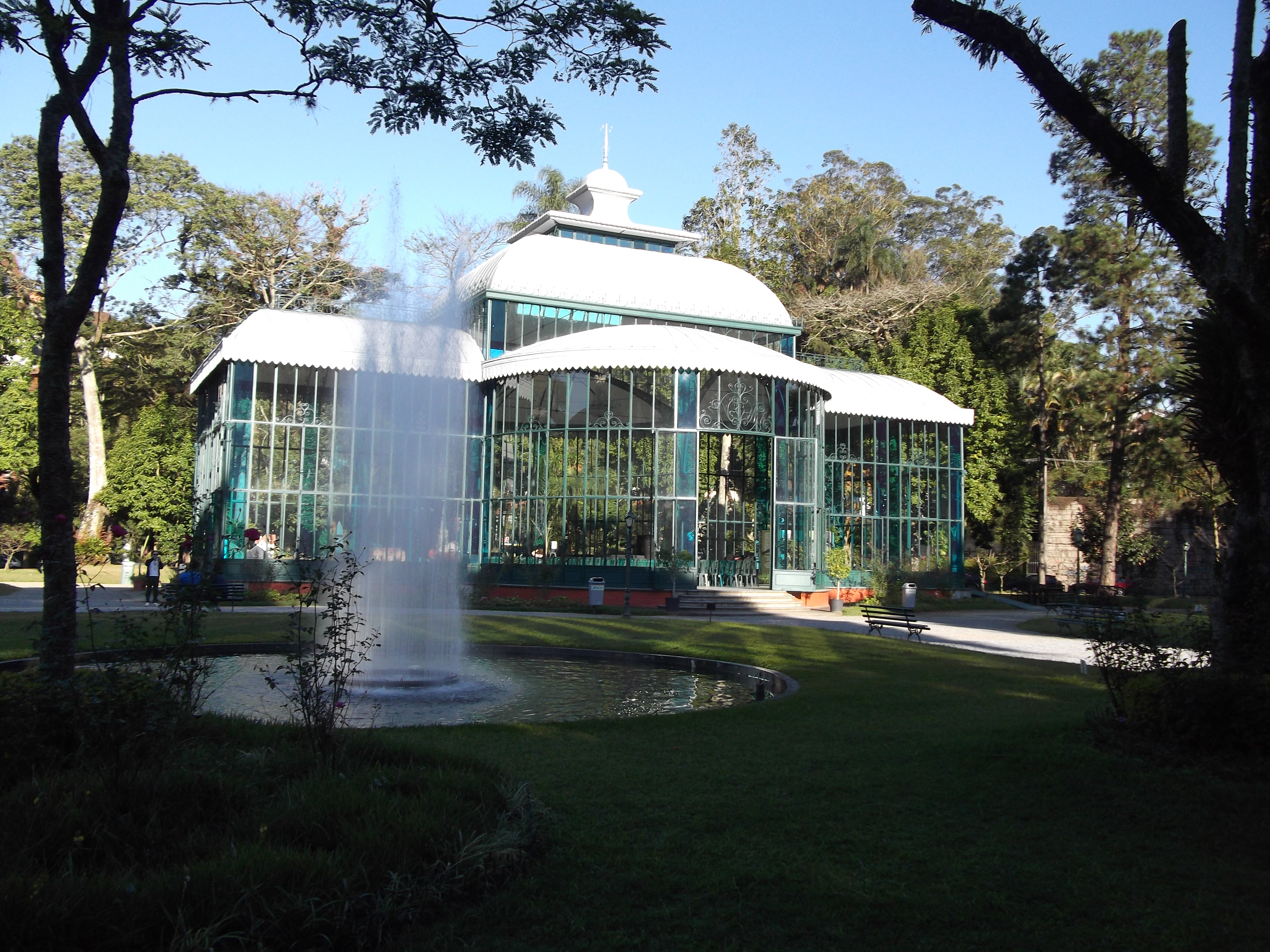
Crystal Palace

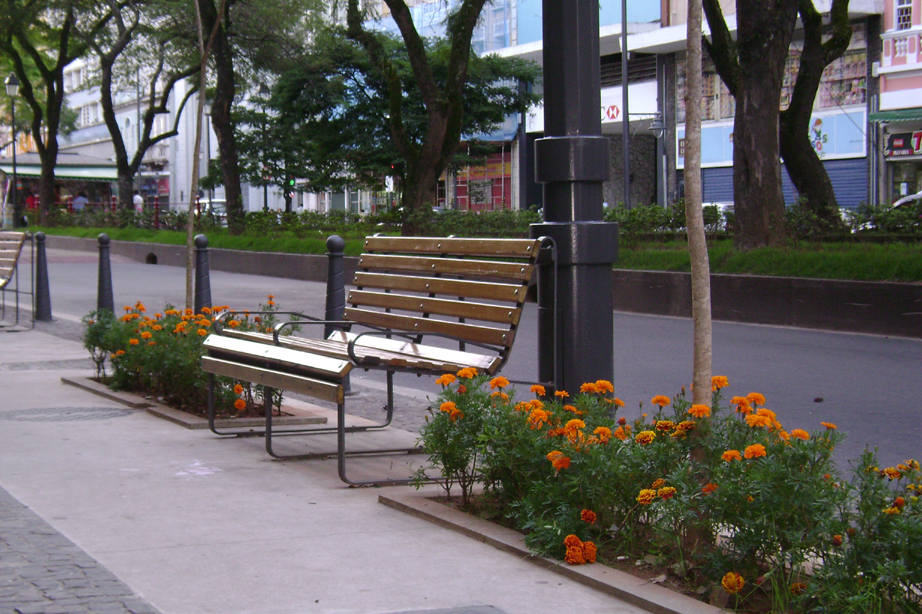
Bench in the center of Petrópolis

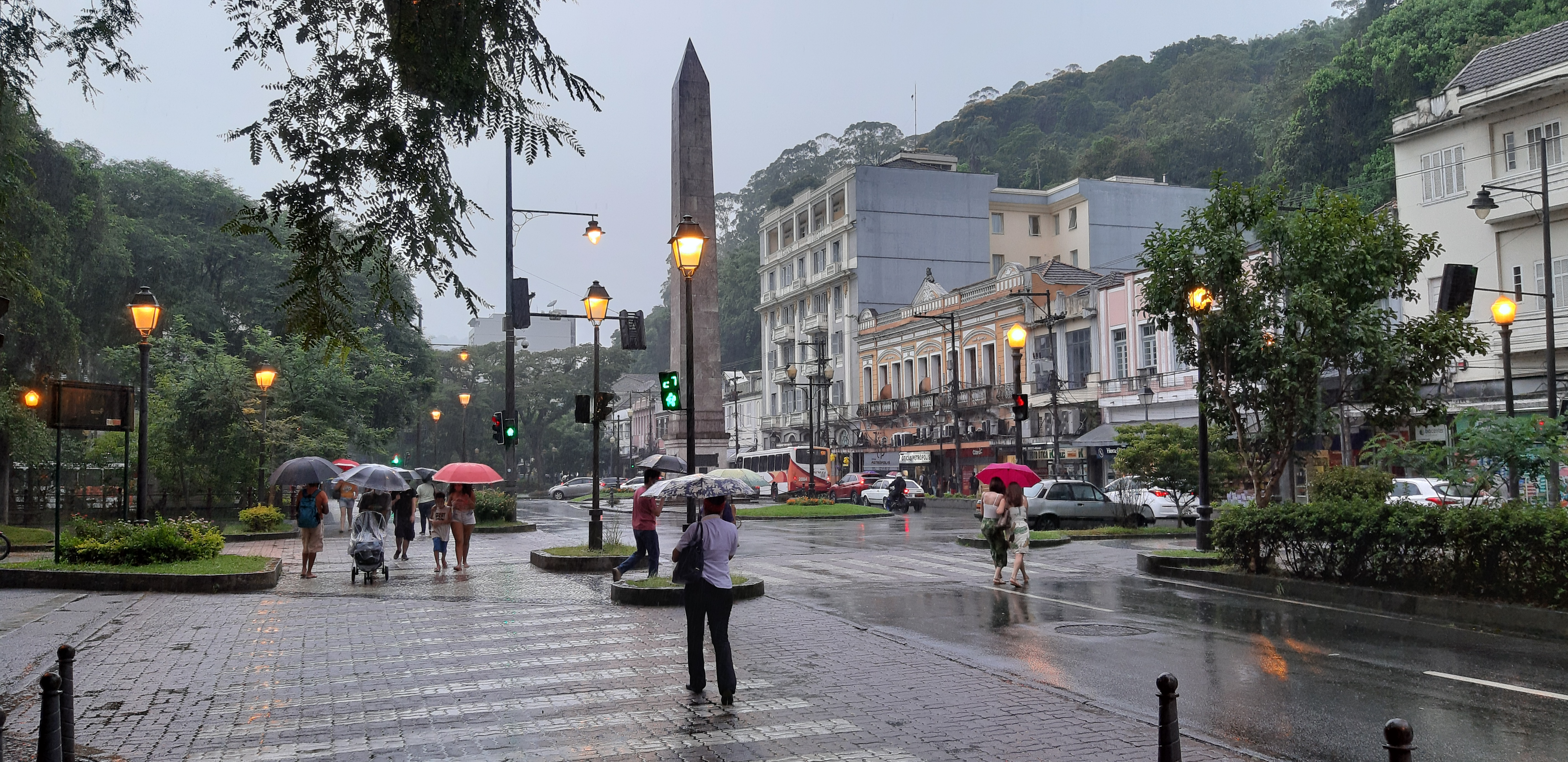
Downtown Petrópolis

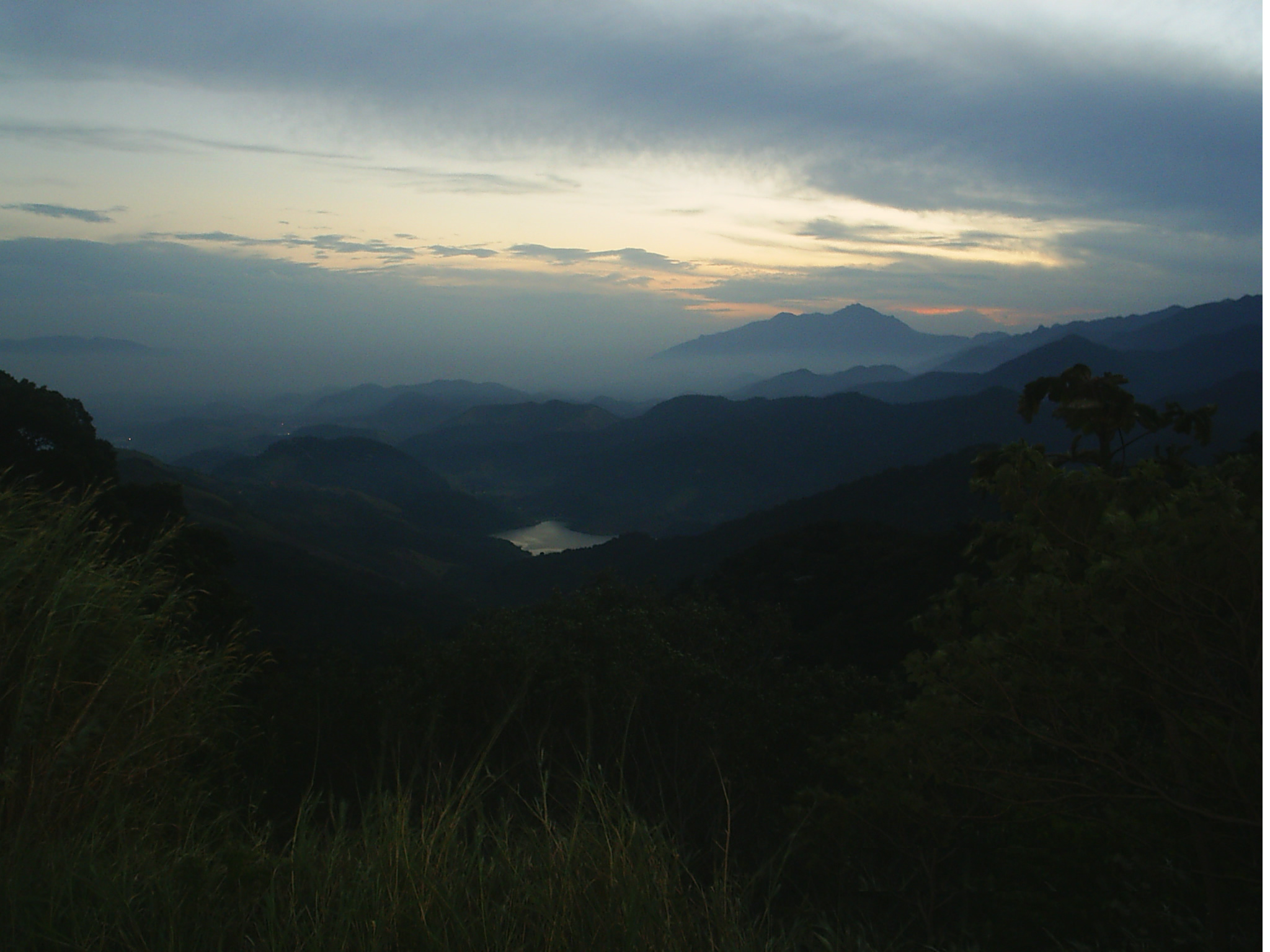
Petrópolis' Mountains

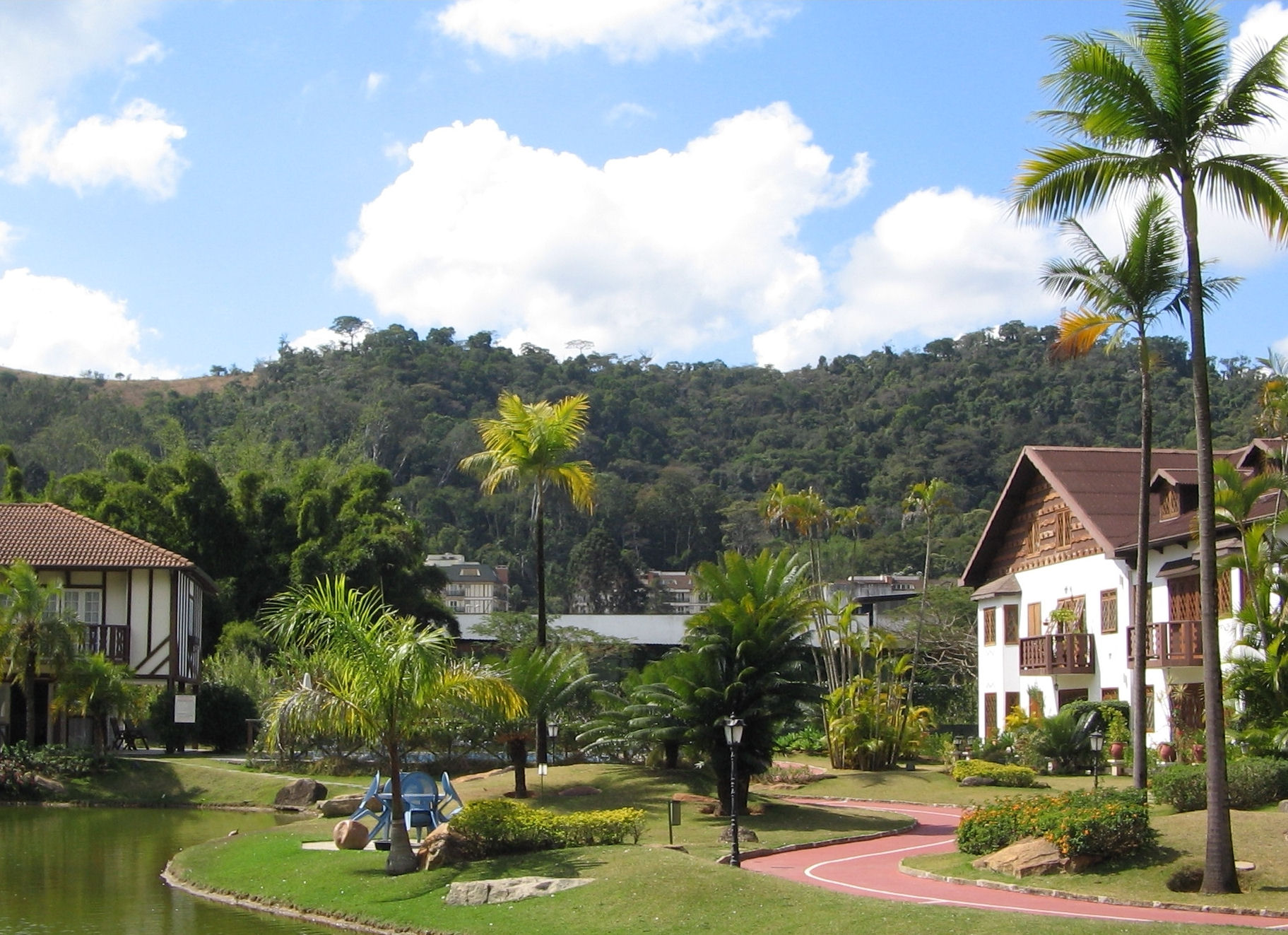
Vale Imperial Residence

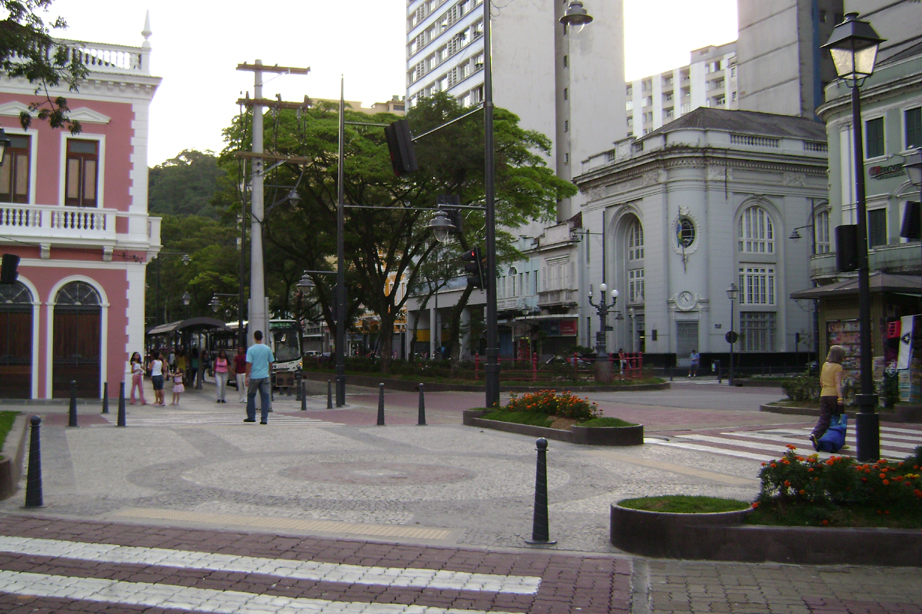
City centre

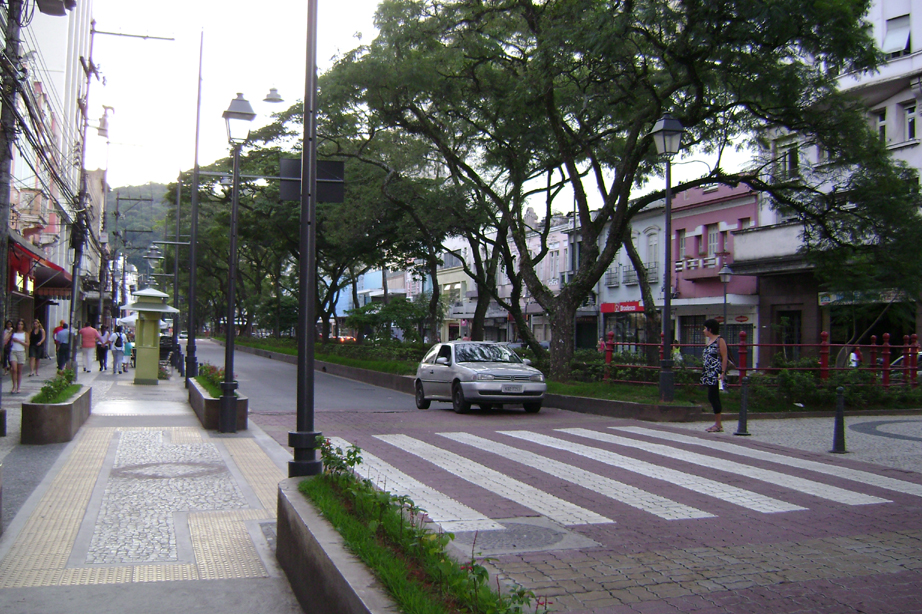
Rua do Imperador (Emperor Street)

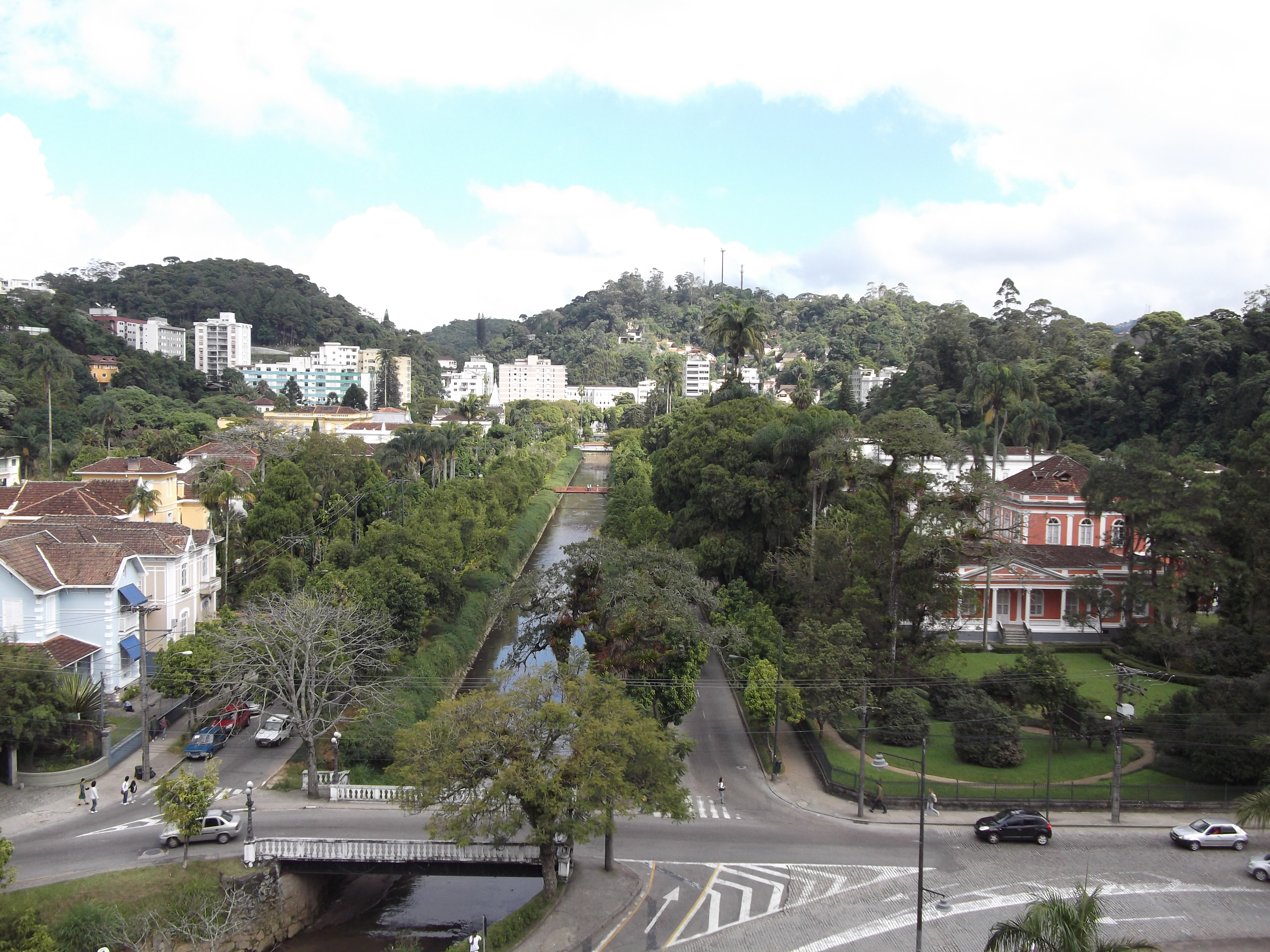
View from the cathedral tower

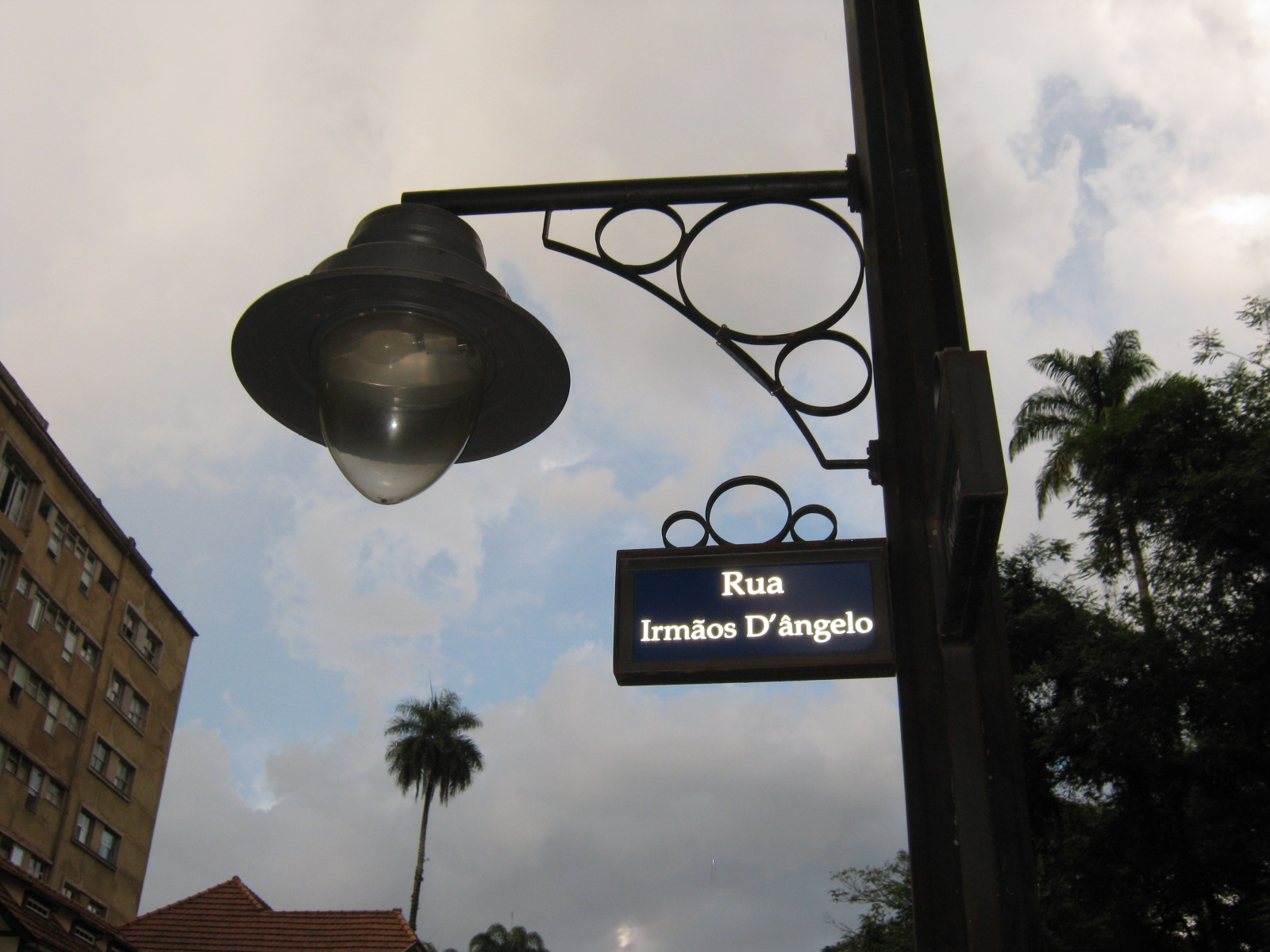
Irmãos D'ângelo Street

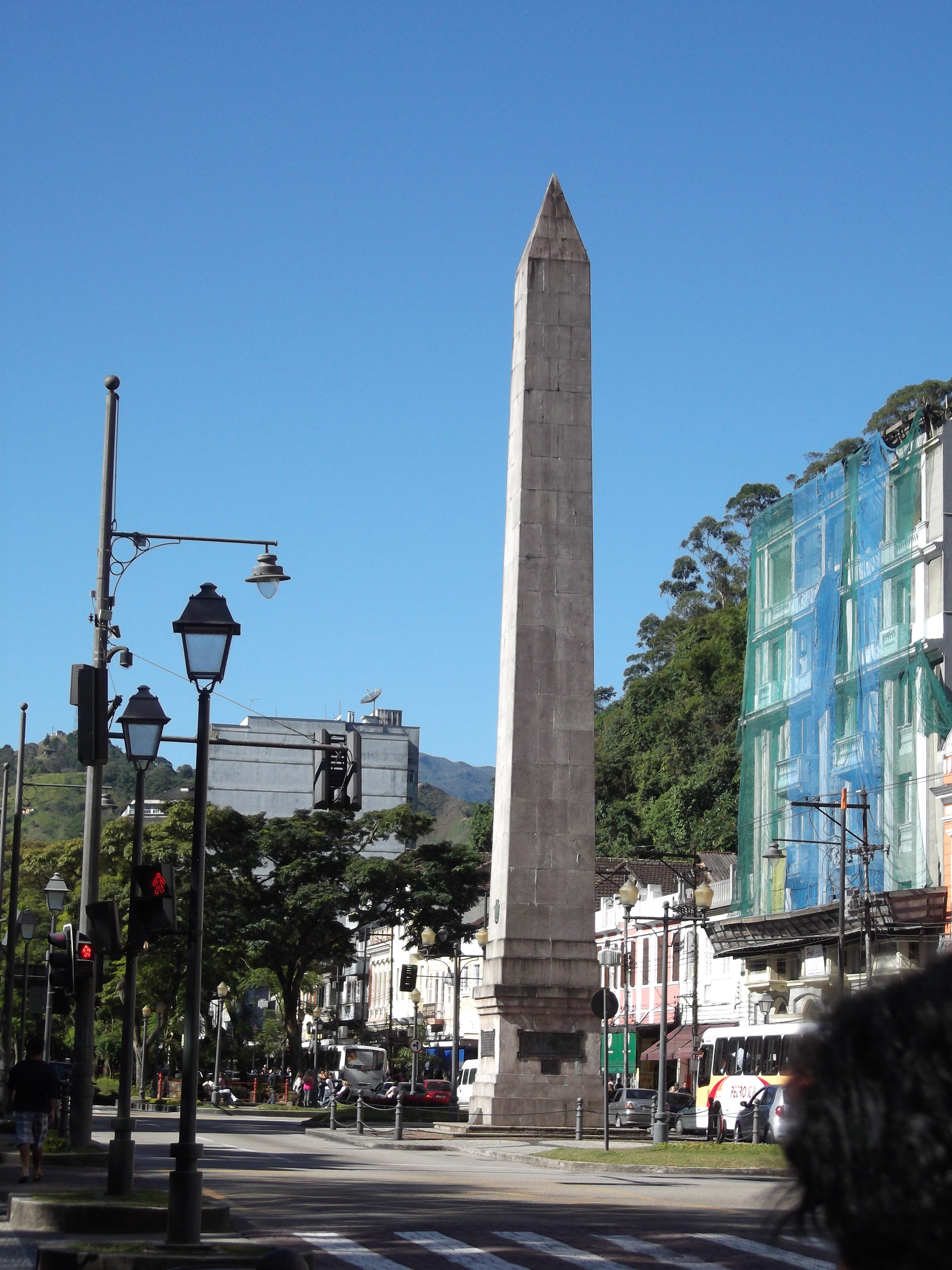
Obelisk of Petrópolis

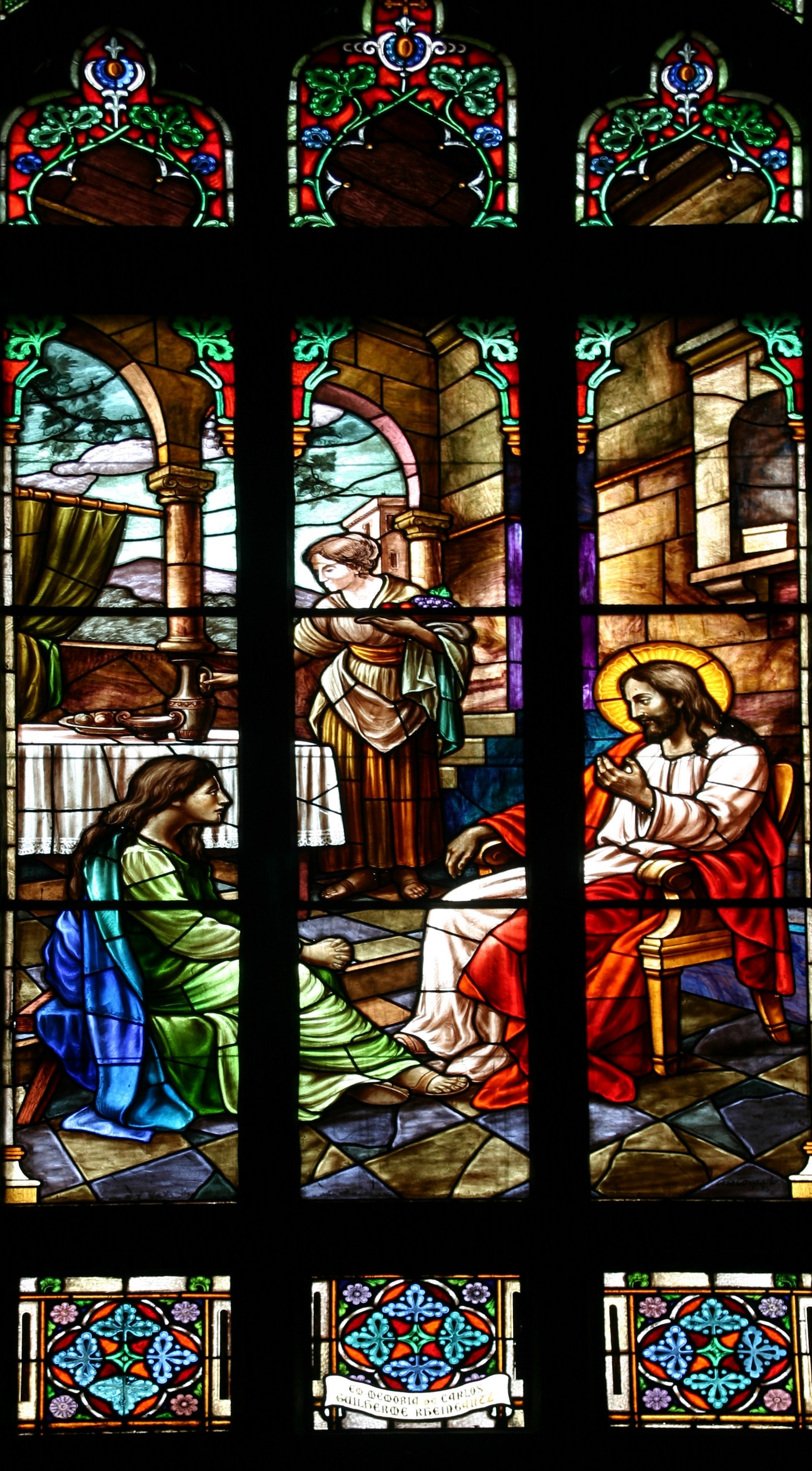
Stained glass windows of Petrópolis Cathedral

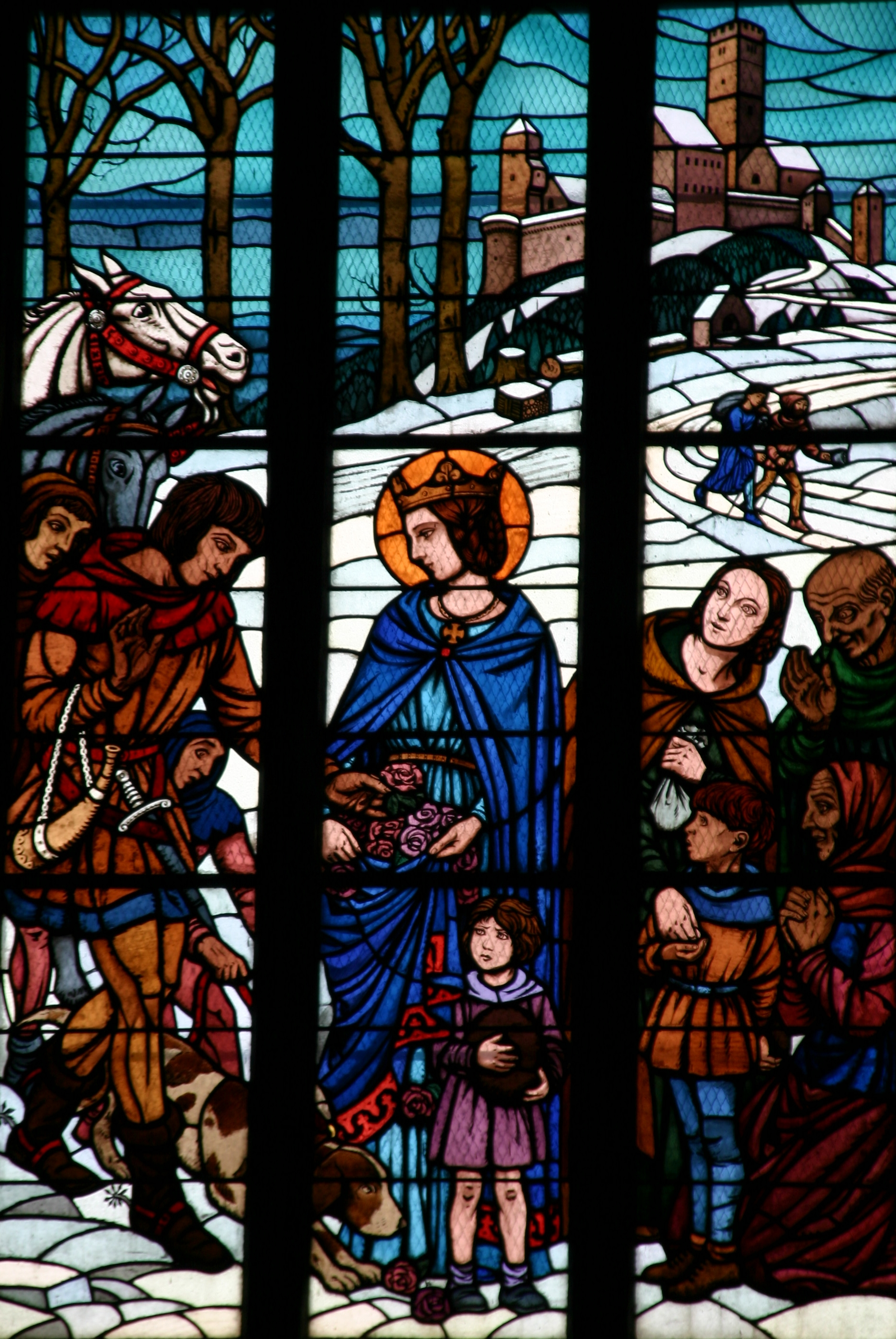
Stained glass windows of Petrópolis Cathedral

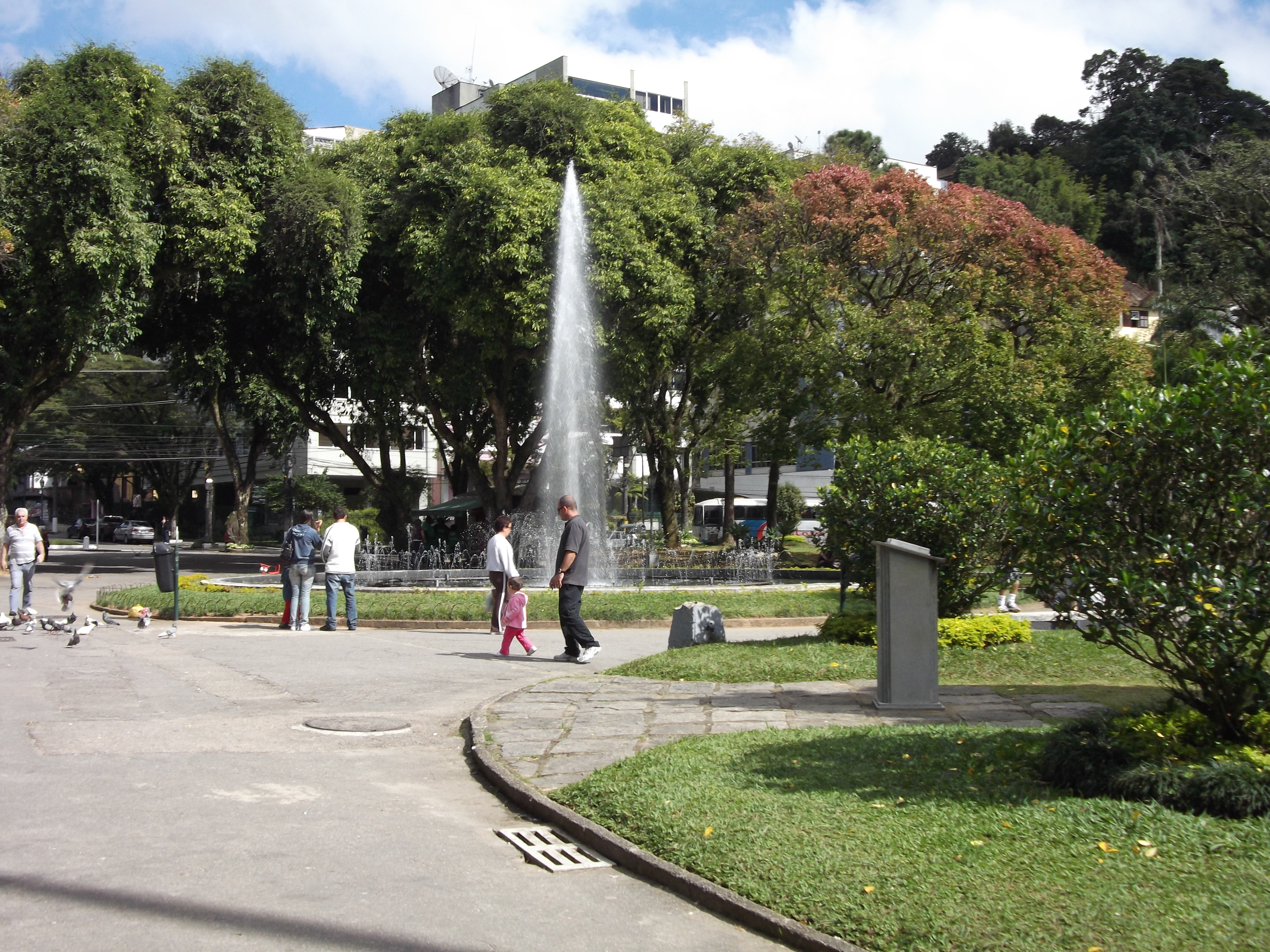
Liberdade Square

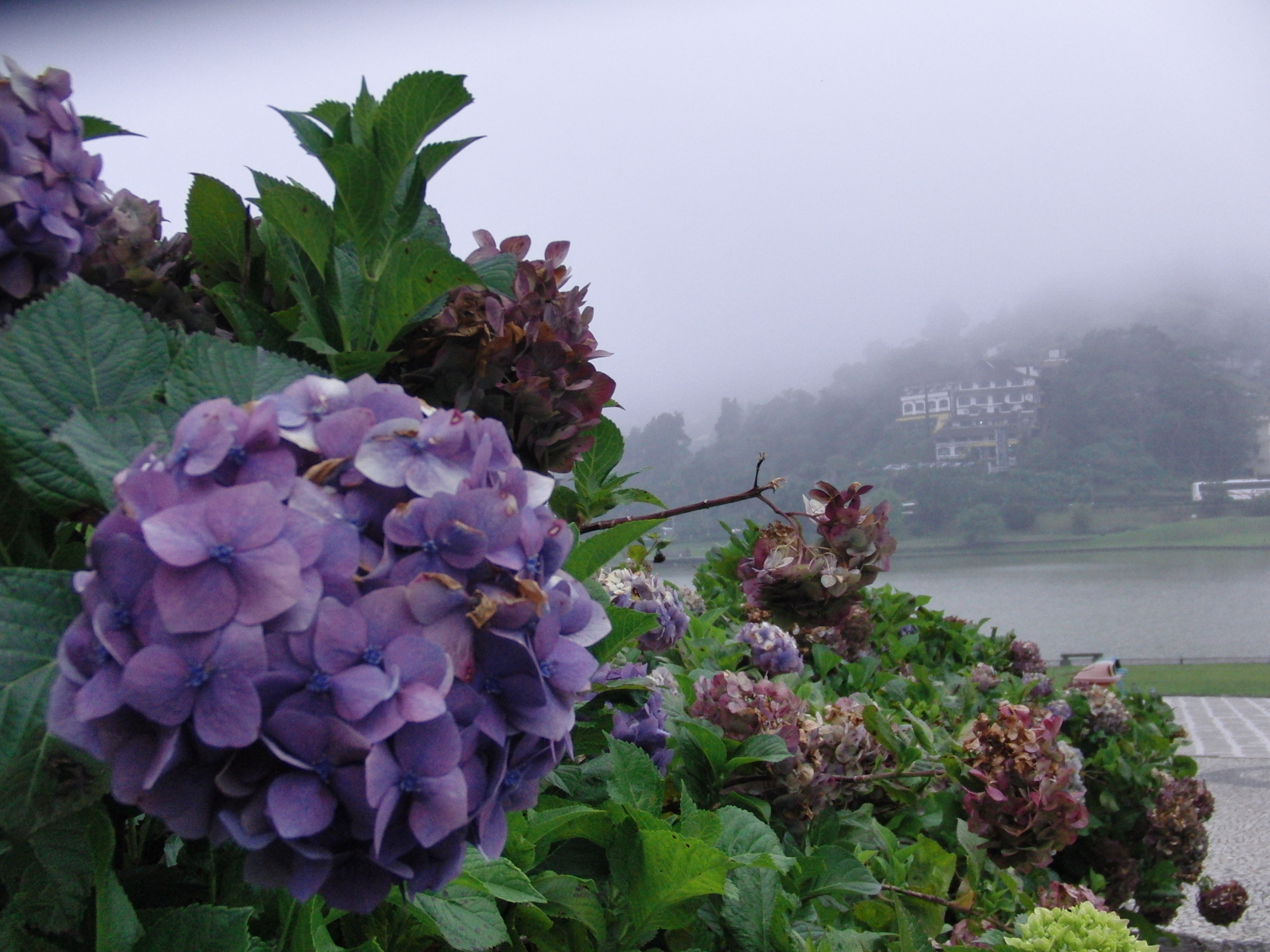
Hydrangea flowers in the fog

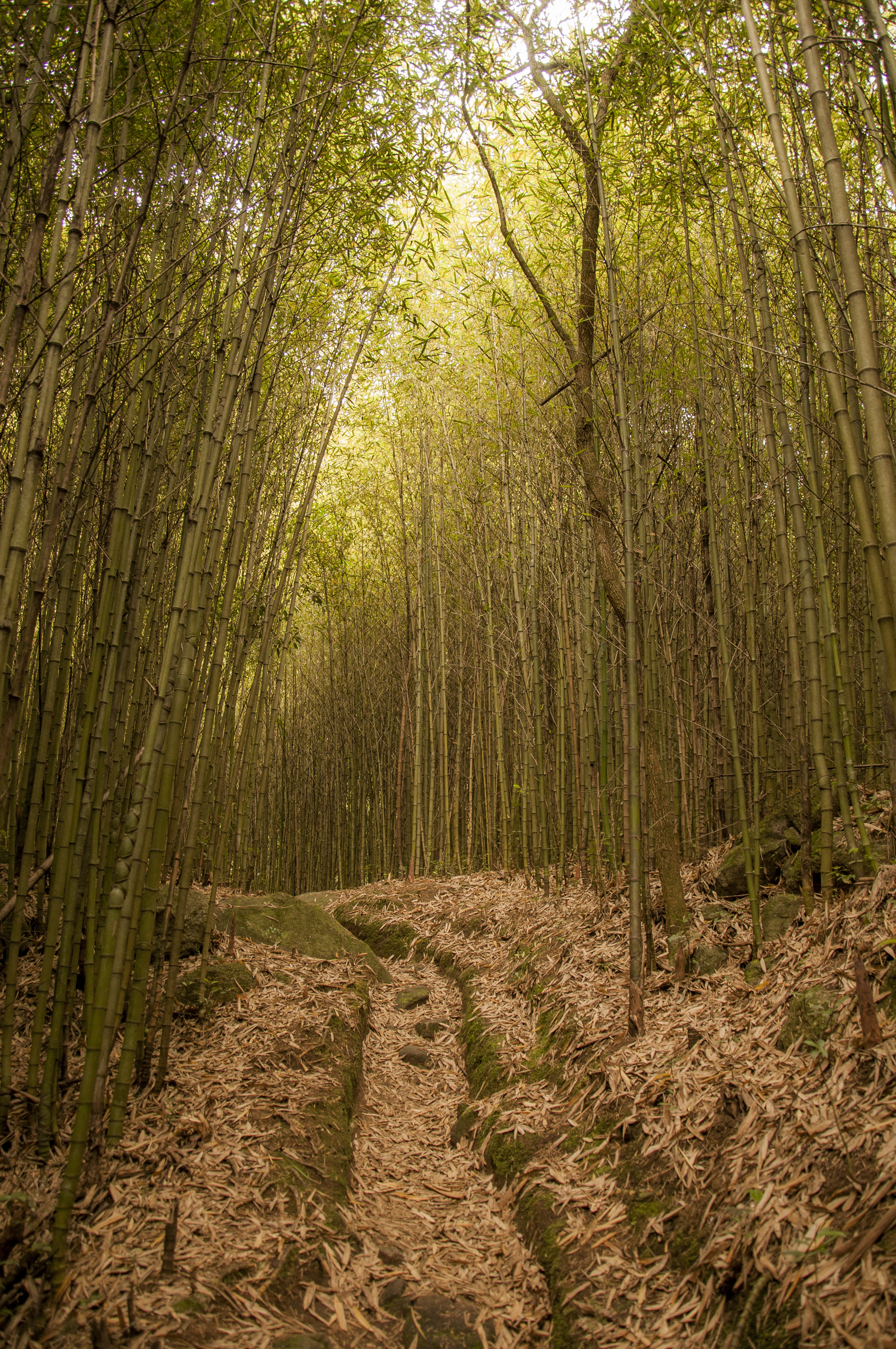
A trail at the Serra dos Órgãos National Park
