= Santos-Dumont (disambiguation) =

Alberto Santos-Dumont was a Brazilian aviation pioneer

Santos-Dumont may also refer to:

- Santos-Dumont Airport, second major airport serving Rio de Janeiro, Brazil
- Santos Dumont, Minas Gerais, a municipality in southern Minas Gerais state, Brazil
- Santos-Dumont (crater), small lunar impact crater
- Rodovia Santos Dumont, a highway in the state of São Paulo, Brazil
- Santos Dumont (miniseries)
- Santos Dumont (supercomputer)
- Santos-Dumont (moonlet), a tiny moonlet of Saturn
- Santos-Dumont crater, crater on moon
