= Moonlet =

Small natural satellite orbiting a planet

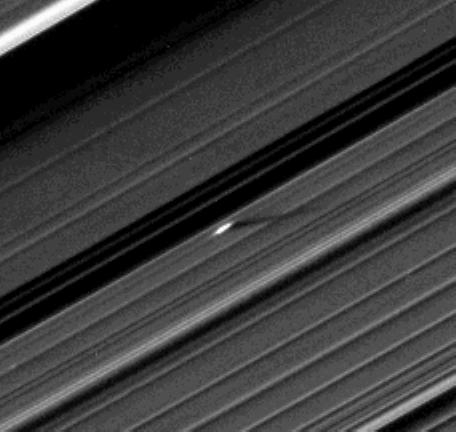
The 400-meter moonlet Earhart in Saturn's A Ring, just outside the Encke Gap

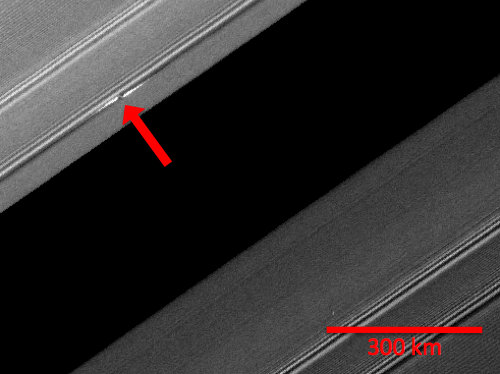
Another image of Earhart

Another moonlet named Bleriot

A moonlet named Santos-Dumont

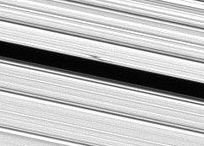
A moonlet in Saturn's A ring

A moonlet, minor moon, minor natural satellite, or minor satellite is a particularly small natural satellite orbiting a planet, dwarf planet, or minor planet.

Up until 1995, moonlets were only hypothetical components of Saturn's F-ring structure, but in that year, the Earth passed through Saturn's ring plane. The Hubble Space Telescope and the European Southern Observatory both captured objects orbiting close or near the F-ring. In 2004, Cassini caught an object 4–5 kilometers in diameter on the outer ring of the F-ring and then 5 hours later on the inner F-ring, showing that the object had orbited.

Several different types of small moons have been called moonlets:

- A belt of objects embedded in a planetary ring, especially around Saturn, such as those in the A Ring, S/2009 S 1 and S/2009 S 2 in the B Ring ("propeller" moonlets), and those in the F Ring
- Occasionally asteroid moons, such as those of 87 Sylvia
- Flashes seen near Jupiter's moon Amalthea that is likely debris ejected from its surface
- Subsatellites

== See also ==
- Minor-planet moon
- Natural satellite
- Ring system

== Links ==
List of moonlets
