= Blériot =

Blériot (English: /ˈblɛrioʊ/, French: [bleʁjo]) may refer to:

- Louis Blériot, a French aviation pioneer
- Blériot Aéronautique, an aircraft manufacturer founded by Louis Blériot
- Blériot-Whippet, a car
- Bleriot (moonlet), a propeller moonlet in Saturn's A Ring
- 11248 Blériot, an asteroid
- Louis Blériot medal given by the Fédération Aéronautique Internationale
