= Peggy (moonlet) =

Moonlet of Saturn

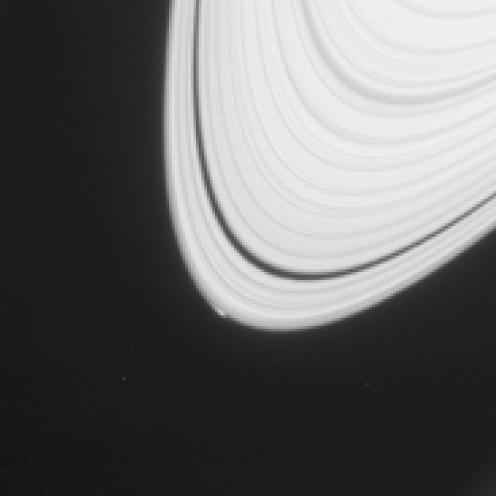
- Cassini image of Peggy at the edge of Saturn's A Ring

Discovery
- Discovered by: Cassini Imaging Team
- Discovery date: 2013

Orbital characteristics
- Semi-major axis: 136,775.20 ±0.03km
- Eccentricity: ≈ 0.000
- Inclination: ≈ 0.0
- Satellite of: Saturn

Physical characteristics
- Mean diameter: 1 kilometre (0.62 mi)
- Synodic rotation period: assumed synchronous

Peggy is the informal name for a former moonlet in the outermost part of Saturn's Ring A, orbiting 136,775 kilometres (84,988 mi) away from the planet. The moonlet was discovered by the Cassini Imaging Team in 2013 and it may likely be exiting Saturn's A Ring. No direct image of Peggy has ever been made. Similar moons to Peggy include Bleriot, Earhart and Santos-Dumont among others.

== Etymology ==
The name of the moonlet comes from the mother-in-law of Carl D. Murray, a professor at the Queen Mary University of London. Murray named it after his mother-in-law because it was her 80th birthday at the time.

== Discovery ==
The moonlet was first discovered in 2013, although its discovery was possible in 2012. Cassini took 2 images of the edge of Saturn's A Ring, thereby ruling out it being a cosmic ray artifact. There were disturbances at the edges of Saturn's A Ring, with one of these being approximately 20% brighter than its surroundings. There were also protuberances at the edge of the usually smooth A Ring.

== Collision ==
When it was first discovered, no similar object has been discovered in Saturn's main rings. The moonlet was then seen again in 2014 but it was much dimmer than it was in 2013. Carl Murray suggests that there may have been a collision or was gravitationally ejected, though without evidence. In Cassini observations past 2014, Peggy appears to be broken into two pieces, with the other being named Peggy B.
