= Santos-Dumont (crater) =

Lunar crater

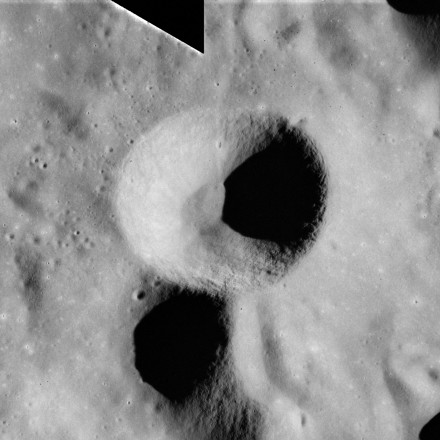
- Apollo 15 image
- Coordinates: 27.7°N 4.8°E
- Diameter: 8 km
- Colongitude: 356° at sunrise
- Eponym: Alberto Santos-Dumont

Santos-Dumont is a small lunar impact crater that lies in the northern end of the Montes Apenninus range at the eastern edge of the Mare Imbrium. It is located about 30 kilometers to the northeast of Mons Hadley, a mountain massif.

This crater is a circular, bowl-shaped formation that is situated atop a ridge in the Montes Apenninus. It is otherwise an unremarkable formation with no unusual features and little appearance of wear.

To the northwest of Santos-Dumont is a 90-km-wide system of rilles designated the Rimae Fresnel, being named for the Promontorium Fresnel that lies to the north of the crater. This last formation forms the northern end of the Montes Apenninus, and lies astride the gap that joins the Mare Imbrium to the west with the Mare Serenitatis to the east. To the southeast, in the valley past Mons Hadley, is the landing site of the Apollo 15 mission.

This feature is named in honour of the Brazilian aviation pioneer Alberto Santos-Dumont. It was previously designated Hadley B.
