= Santos-Dumont (moonlet) =

Santos-Dumont, as photographed by the Cassini spacecraft.

Santos-Dumont is a nickname for a propeller moonlet of Saturn embedded in the A Ring. It was nicknamed Santos-Dumont after Brazilian-French aviator, Alberto Santos-Dumont. The moonlet is too small to be imaged directly, however the propeller feature was imaged in high resolution by the Cassini spacecraft on 21 February, 2017. Cassini scientists had been tracking it for the previous decade.

== See also ==
- Moons of Saturn
- Bleriot (moonlet)
- Peggy (moonlet)
- Earhart (moonlet)
- Methone (moon)
