= Bleriot (moonlet) =

Moonlet in Saturn's outermost ring

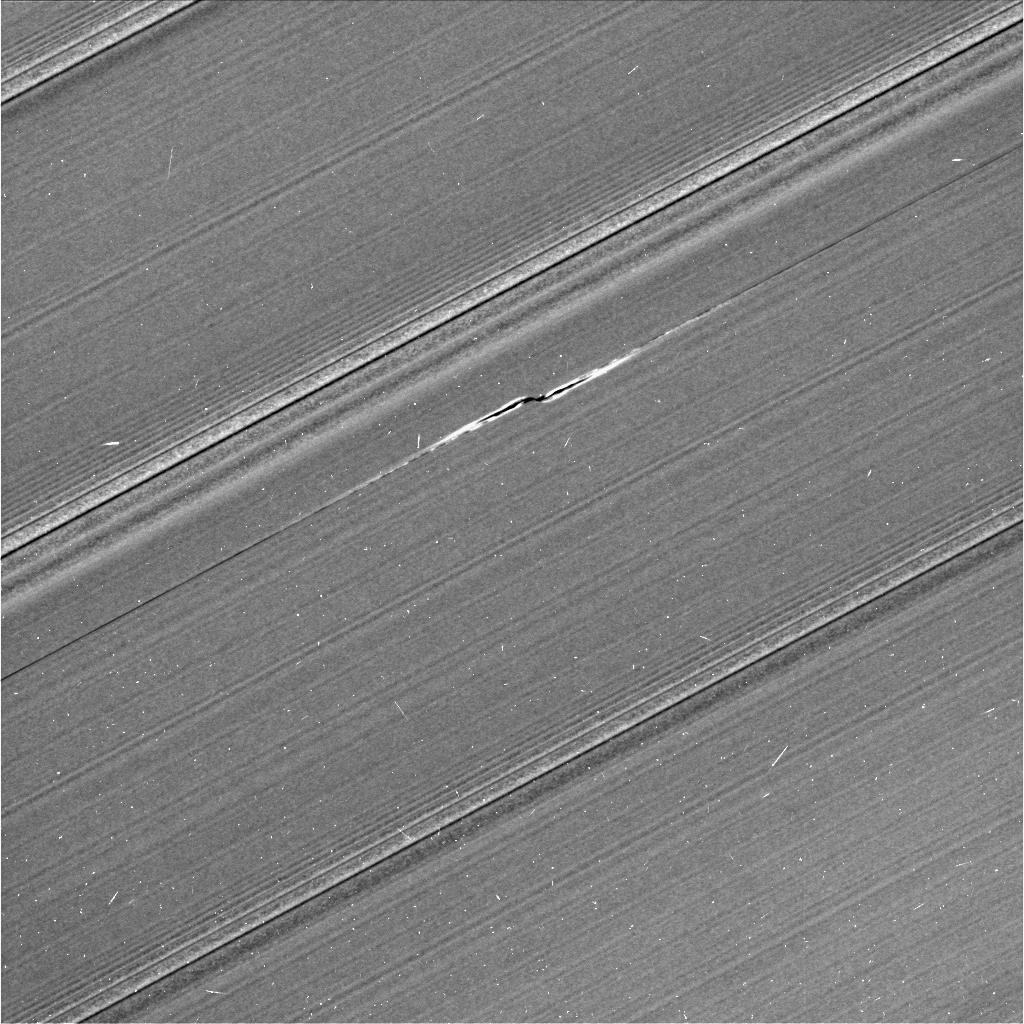
- Cassini image directed at Bleriot.

Discovery
- Discovered by: Cassini Imaging Team
- Discovery date: 2005

Orbital characteristics
- Semi-major axis: non-Keplerian motion
- Eccentricity: ≈ 0.000
- Orbital period (sidereal): ~3.7 years
- Inclination: ≈ 0.0
- Satellite of: Saturn

Physical characteristics
- Mean diameter: 860±140 m
- Synodic rotation period: assumed synchronous

Bleriot or Blériot (English: /ˈblɛrioʊ/ BLERR-ee-oh, French: [bleʁjo]) is the informal name for a propeller moonlet within Saturn's A Ring. It is about 860 metres (2,820 ft) across, making it the largest of these propeller moonlets. It has been tracked by the Cassini Imaging Team since 2005.

Bleriot has been subject to some scientific studies due to its large size and has helped scientists improve their understanding of the interactions between objects within Saturn's rings. The orbit of Bleriot has some anomalies, such as it sometimes being much further behind or ahead than it is predicted to be.

It is named after the French aviator Louis Blériot, who was the first person to fly across the English Channel.

Due to its small size, Bleriot cannot be directly imaged, it can only be noticed by the "propeller-shaped" disturbances it creates around it. It is also responsible for a 40-kilometre gap in the A-ring.

== See also ==
- Peggy (moonlet)
- S/2009 S 1
