= National Laboratory of Scientific Computation (Brazil) =

Institution

LNCC
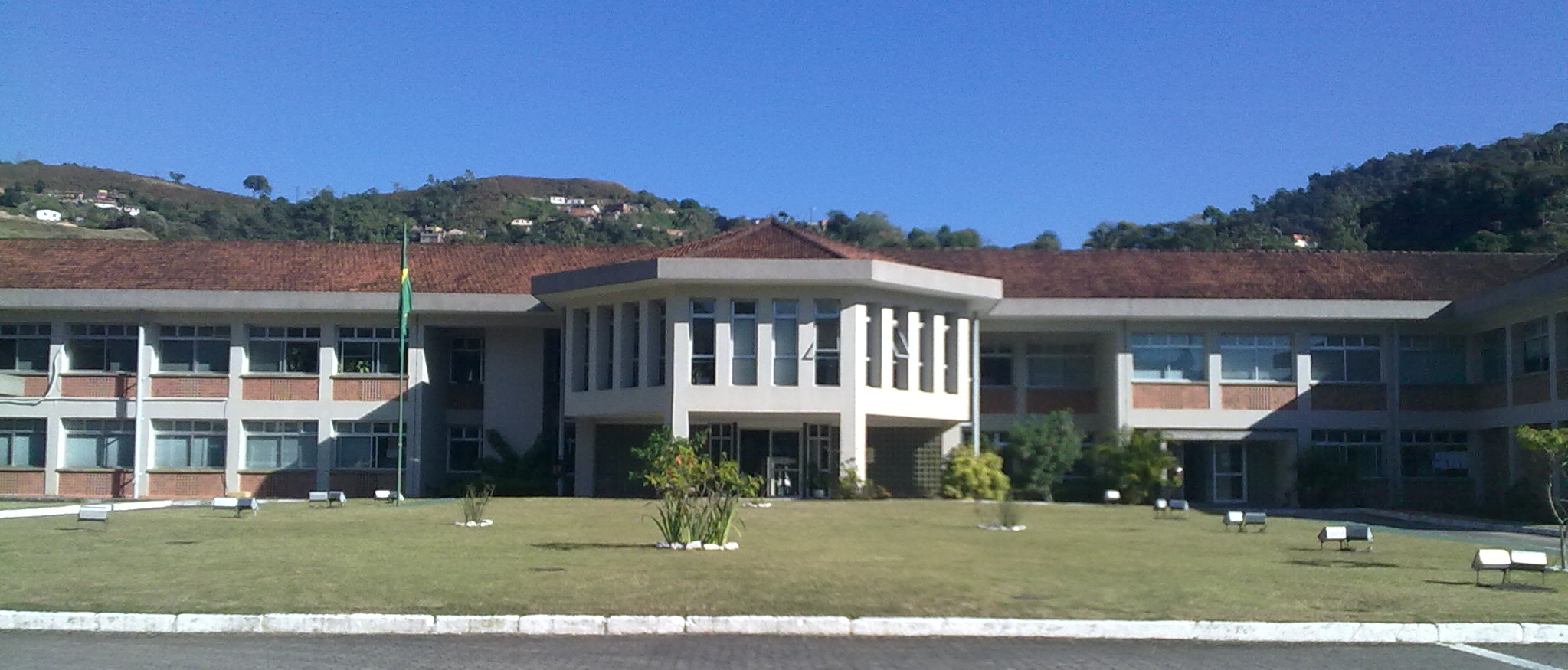
- Alternative names: LNCC
- Organization: Ministry of Science, Technology and Innovation
- Location: Petrópolis, Rio de Janeiro, Brazil
- Coordinates: 22.530077°S 43.217403°W
- Altitude: 838 m (2,749 ft)
- Established: 1980
- Website: www.gov.br/lncc
- Related media on Commons

The National Laboratory of Scientific Computation or the National Laboratory for Scientific Computing (LNCC; Portuguese: Laboratório Nacional de Computação Científica) is a Brazilian institution for scientific research and technological development linked to the Ministry of Science, Technology and Innovation (MCTI), specialized in scientific computing. It was created in 1980 and since 1988 it has been headquartered in the city of Petrópolis, state of Rio de Janeiro, Brazil.

The institution is known for its participation in the arrival of the internet in Brazil in the 1980s, as a result of joint work with the Federal University of Rio de Janeiro (UFRJ). It is also known for the Santos Dumond Supercomputer, the largest in Latin America.

The institution has a postgraduate program (master's and doctor's degree) in computational modeling. Some of the laboratory's lines of research focus on interdisciplinary areas such as biosystems, bioinformatics, computational biology, atmosphere and oceans, environment, multiscale science, among others. In addition to its academic role, it participates in some processes related to meteorology, computer modeling and is used by some companies, such as Petrobras.
