= S/2009 S 1 =

Moonlet in Saturn's B ring

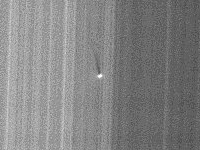
- Cassini image of S/2009 S 1 as a bright dot casting a long shadow over Saturn's B Ring

Discovery
- Discovered by: Cassini Imaging Team
- Discovery date: 2009

Orbital characteristics
- Semi-major axis: 116914 km
- Eccentricity: ≈ 0.000
- Orbital period (sidereal): ≈ 0.4720 d (11.33 h)
- Inclination: ≈ 0.0
- Satellite of: Saturn

Physical characteristics
- Mean diameter: 0.3 km
- Synodic rotation period: assumed synchronous

S/2009 S 1 is a moonlet embedded in the outer part of Saturn's B Ring, orbiting 117,000 km (73,000 mi) away from the planet. It was discovered by the Cassini Imaging Team during the Saturnian equinox event on 26 July 2009, when the Cassini spacecraft imaged the moonlet casting a 36 km (22 mi)-long shadow onto the B Ring. With a diameter of 300 m (1,000 ft), it is most likely a long-lived solid body, which would count it as the smallest and innermost known moon of Saturn (as well as being the smallest known natural satellite in the Solar System).

== Discovery ==
S/2009 S 1 was first identified by the Cassini Imaging Team led by Carolyn Porco, in a single image taken by the Cassini spacecraft approximately 296,000 km (184,000 mi) from Saturn on 26 July 2009 11:30 UTC. The moonlet was discovered during Saturn's 2009 equinox, when it cast an approximately 36 km (22 mi)-long shadow on the planet's B ring.

== Characteristics ==
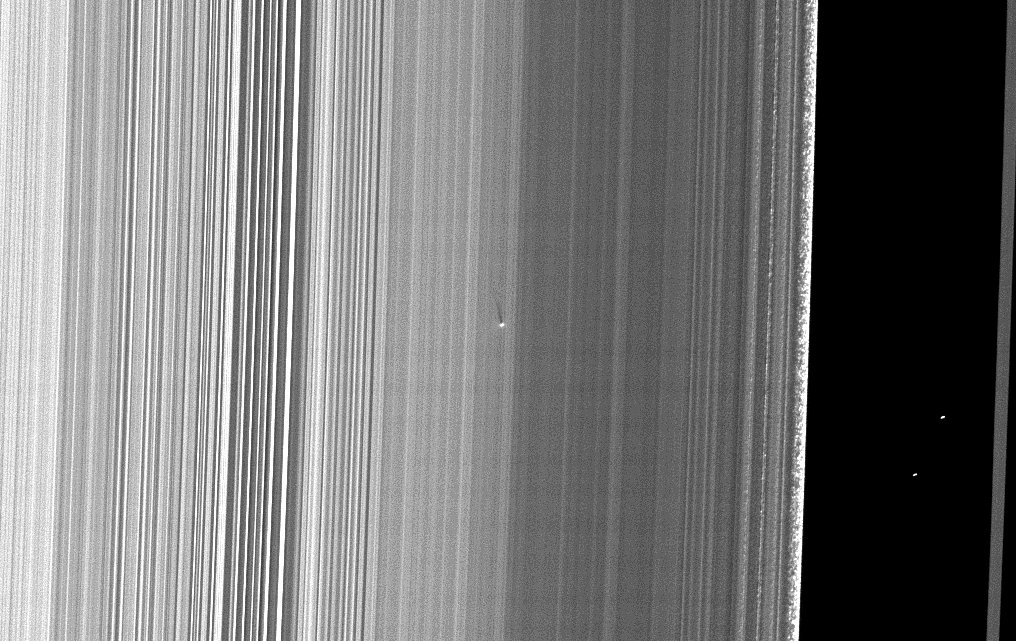
A wider perspective of the image above. S/2009 S 1 is in the center. The Cassini Division is on the right.

Based on the shadow's width, the Cassini Imaging Team infer a diameter of 300 m (1,000 ft) for S/2009 S 1. The presence of a shadow suggests that S/2009 S 1 is most likely a solid body large enough to have existed since the formation of the B ring. This particular moon is one of the smallest moons of Saturn discovered.

S/2009 S 1 is located about 650 km (400 mi) interior to the edge of the B ring, corresponding to a radial distance of 116,914 ± 17 km (72,647 ± 11 mi) from the center of Saturn. The moonlet protrudes 150 m (500 ft) above the B ring plane, which has a vertical thickness of 5 m (16 ft) for comparison.

Although it is embedded in the B ring, S/2009 S 1 does not appear to produce extensive, propeller-shaped disturbance features unlike the propeller moonlets in Saturn's A ring. This may be because the B ring is very dense at the moonlet's location, which would hinder the formation of visible propeller gaps around the moonlet. Some have proposed that it does not actually exist and the bright spot is just the effect of a coincidental meteoroid impact, though it was pointed out other propeller moonlets similarly appeared as a dusty blob around the time of equinox. Alternatively, the bright spot could be from the entire propeller structure rather than the moonlet itself.

== See also ==
- Moonlet
- Moons of Saturn
- Rings of Saturn
