= Promontorium Fresnel =

Headland on the near side of the Moon

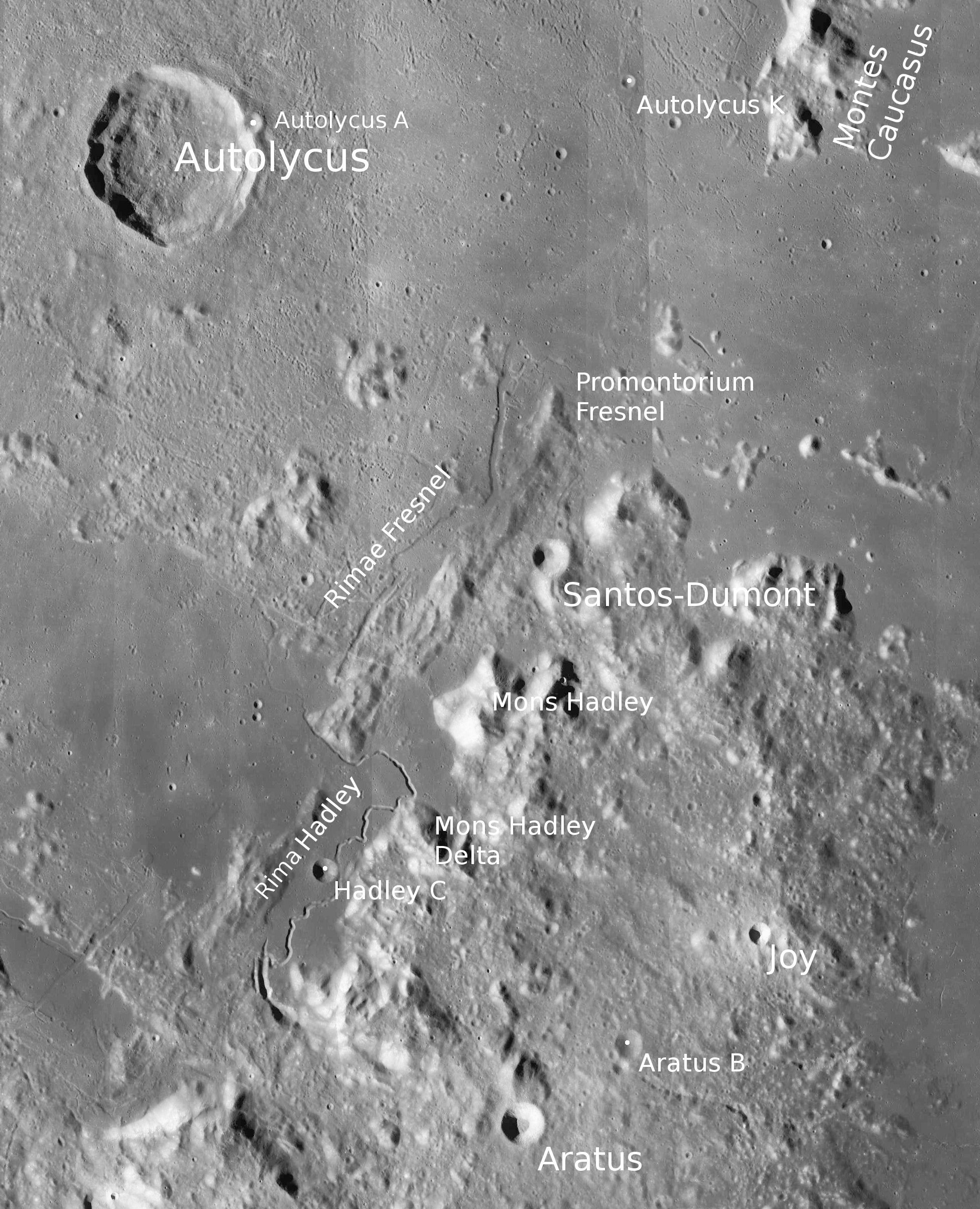
Promonontorium Fresnel is in the mid-top of the LRO image

Promontorium Fresnel (Latin for "Cape Fresnel") is a headland on the near side of the Moon. It is located at the northern end of the Montes Apenninus and separates the lunar mares of Mare Serenitatis and Mare Imbrium. Just west of the mountainous cape is Rimae Fresnel. Both features were named after the French physicist Augustin-Jean Fresnel. Its coordinates are 28.63°N 4.75°E.
