= Rimae Fresnel =

Escarpment on the Moon

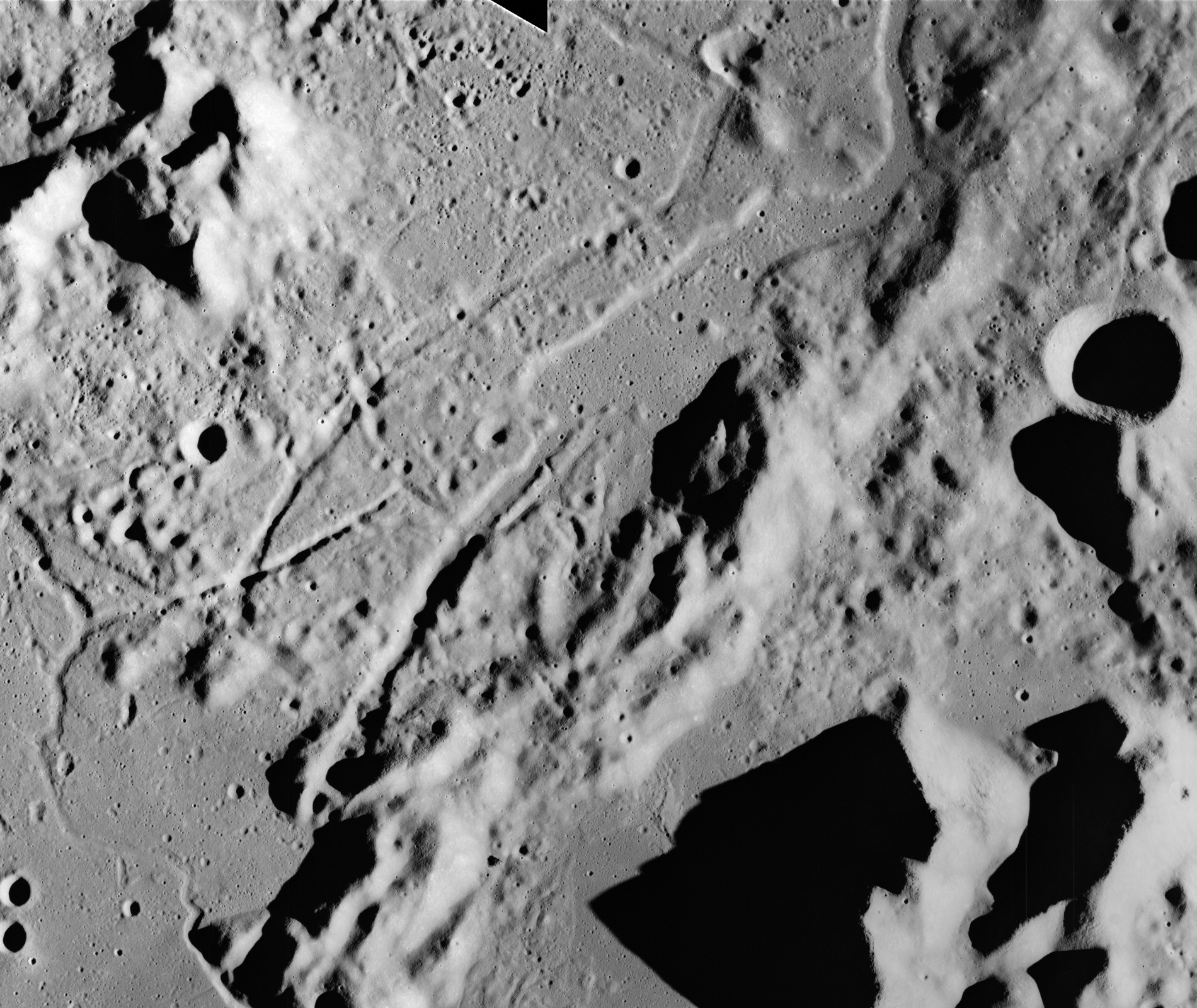
Rimae Fresnel are the series of northeast-trending graben shown in this image

Rimae Fresnel is a 90km-long arcuate escarpment on the Moon at 28.0°N 4.0°E. Both the escarpment and the nearby Promontorium Fresnel were named after the French physicist Augustin-Jean Fresnel.
