= Santos Dumont (supercomputer) =

Brazilian supercomputer

Santos Dumont is a Brazilian supercomputer that in 2022 ranked 178th on the TOP500 list of the world's fastest computers. It is housed in the state of Rio de Janeiro, at the base of the National Laboratory of Scientific Computation (LNCC) in Petrópolis. It has a capacity of 5.1 petaflops.

== History and impact ==
The supercomputer was developed in France and acquired by the Brazilian government in 2015 for R$50 million. When the machine arrived at LNCC in 2015, it took the position of the largest computer in Latin America. In 2019, it underwent an upgrade, increasing its processing capacity from 1.1 to 5.1 petaflops. During the peak of the COVID-19 pandemic, it assisted researchers in sequencing the coronavirus. As of November 2023, a new upgrade was planned for 2024, boosting its capacity to 23 petaflops.

Since its installation in 2016, it has contributed to the publication of over 900 articles in scientific journals, 42 books and chapters, over 300 theses and dissertations, and generated 11 patents.

== Access ==
The machine is available to Brazilian public or private institutions to support teaching, research, and development activities. Any researcher affiliated with a Brazilian institution can submit proposals to use its computational resources. As of November 2023, 256 projects were using Santos Dumont, with over two thousand active users, running an average of about 200 simultaneous applications daily.
