= Earhart (moonlet) =

Propeller moonlet of Saturn

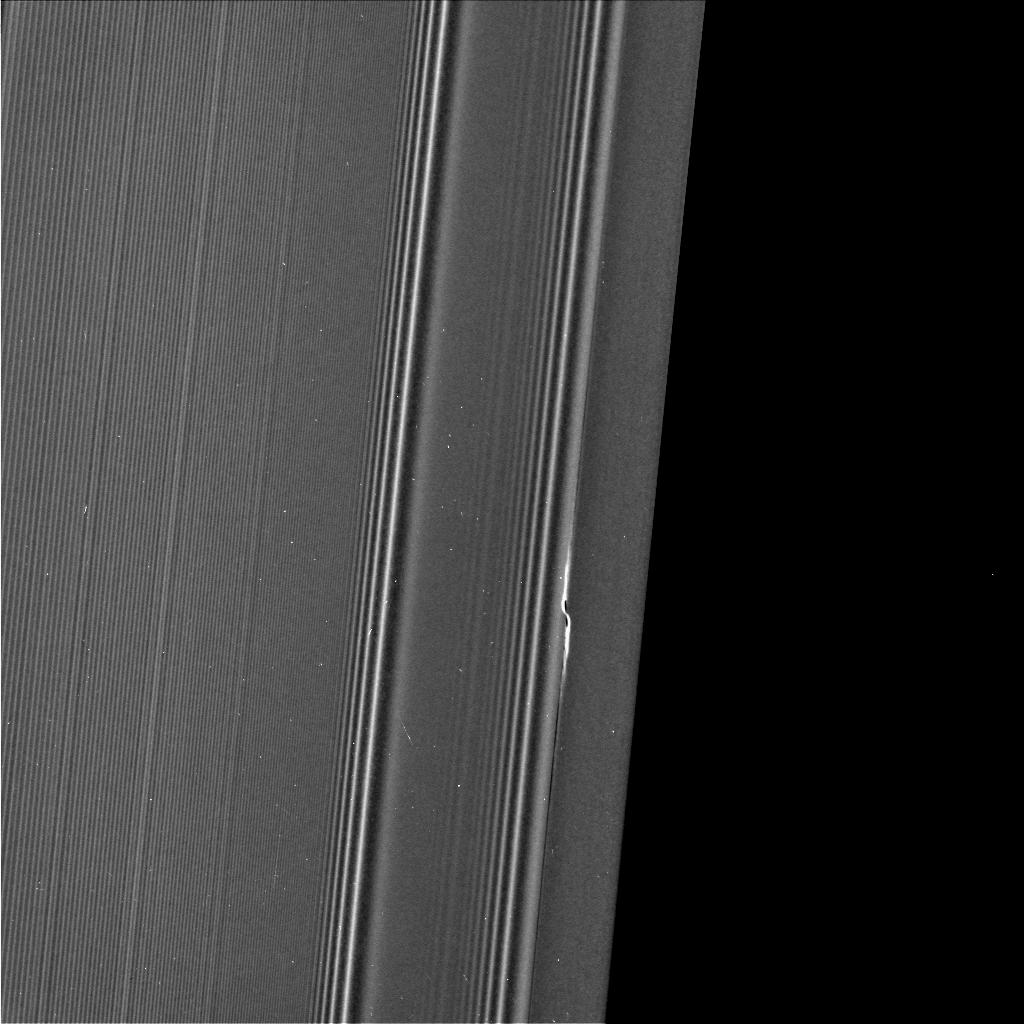
- Cassini image of Earhart

Discovery
- Discovered by: Cassini Imaging Team
- Discovery date: 2019

Orbital characteristics
- Satellite of: Saturn

Physical characteristics
- Mean diameter: 400 m

Earhart is a propeller moonlet of Saturn. It was first seen by the Cassini spacecraft on 13 August, 2009 from a distance of 69,183 miles or 111,340 Kilometers and again on 22 March 2017.

Earhart is situated very close to the Encke Gap. It was seen by Cassini, casting a 350 km long shadow. It is approximately 400 meters long and was named after Amelia Earhart.
