= Saturn =

Sixth planet from the Sun

- Saturn and its prominent rings in natural color, as captured by the Cassini orbiter in July 2008

Designations
- Pronunciation: /ˈsætərn/
- Named after: Saturn
- Adjectives: Saturnian /səˈtɜːrniən/, Cronian / Kronian /ˈkroʊniən/
- Symbol: ♄

Orbital characteristics
- Epoch J2000.0
- Aphelion: 1,514.50 million km (10.1238 AU)
- Perihelion: 1,352.55 million km (9.0412 AU)
- Semi-major axis: 1,433.53 million km (9.5826 AU)
- Eccentricity: 0.0565
- Orbital period (sidereal): 29.4475 yr; 10,755.70 d; 24,225 Saturnian solar days
- Orbital period (synodic): 378.09 days
- Average orbital speed: 9.68 km/s
- Mean anomaly: 317.020°
- Inclination: 2.485° to ecliptic; 5.51° to Sun's equator; 0.93° to invariable plane
- Longitude of ascending node: 113.665°
- Time of perihelion: 2032-Nov-29
- Argument of perihelion: 339.392°
- Known satellites: 293 with formal designations; innumerable additional moonlets.

Physical characteristics
- Mean radius: 58232±6 km 9.1402 Earths
- Equatorial radius: 60268 km (Note: Refers to the level of 1 bar atmospheric pressure); 9.449 Earths
- Polar radius: 54364 km; 8.552 Earths
- Flattening: 0.09796
- Circumference: 365882.4 km (equatorial)
- Surface area: 4.27×10^{10} km^{2}; 83.703 Earths
- Volume: 8.2713×10^{14} km^{3}; 763.59 Earths
- Mass: (5.68317±0.00026)×10^{26} kg; 95.159 Earths
- Mean density: 0.6871±0.0002 g/cm^{3} 0.1246 Earths
- Surface gravity: 10.44 m/s^{2} 1.065 g_{0}
- Moment of inertia factor: 0.22
- Escape velocity: 35.5 km/s
- Synodic rotation period: 10 h 32 m 36 s; 10.5433 hours,
- Sidereal rotation period: 10^{h} 33^{m} 38^{s} ^{+ 1^{m} 52^{s}}_{− 1^{m} 19^{s}}
- Equatorial rotation velocity: 9.87 km/s
- Axial tilt: 26.73° (to orbit)
- North pole right ascension: 40.589°; 2^{h} 42^{m} 21^{s}
- North pole declination: 83.537°
- Albedo: 0.342 (Bond); 0.499 (geometric)
Surface temp.	min	mean	max
1 bar		134 K
0.1 bar	88 K	97 K	151 K
- Apparent magnitude: −0.55 to +1.17
- Absolute magnitude (H): −9.7
- Angular diameter: 14.5″ to 20.1″ (excludes rings)

Atmosphere
- Surface pressure: >>1000 bars
- Scale height: 59.5 km
- Composition by volume: 96.3%±2.4% hydrogen; 3.25%±2.4% helium; 0.45%±0.2% methane; 0.0125%±0.0075% ammonia; 0.0110%±0.0058% hydrogen deuteride; 0.0007%±0.00015% ethane; Icy volatiles: ammonia; water ice; ammonium hydrosulfide

Saturn is the sixth planet from the Sun, and is the second largest planet in the Solar System, after Jupiter. It is a gas giant, with an average radius of about 9 times that of Earth. It has an eighth of the average density of Earth, but is over 95 times more massive. Even though Saturn is almost as big as Jupiter, it has less than a third of its mass. Saturn orbits the Sun at a distance of 9.59 AU (1,434 million km), with an orbital period of 29.45 years.

Saturn's interior is thought to be composed of a rocky core, surrounded by a deep layer of metallic hydrogen, an intermediate layer of liquid hydrogen and liquid helium, and an outer layer of gas. Saturn has a pale yellow hue, due to ammonia crystals in its upper atmosphere. An electrical current in the metallic hydrogen layer is thought to give rise to Saturn's planetary magnetic field, which is weaker than Earth's, but has a magnetic moment 580 times that of Earth because of Saturn's greater size. Saturn's magnetic field strength is about a twentieth that of Jupiter. The outer atmosphere is generally bland and lacking in contrast, although long-lived features can appear. Wind speeds on Saturn can reach 1,800 kilometers per hour (1,100 miles per hour).

The planet has a bright and extensive system of rings, composed mainly of ice particles, with a smaller amount of rocky debris and dust. At least 293 moons orbit the planet, of which 63 are officially named; these do not include the hundreds of moonlets in the rings. Titan, Saturn's largest moon and the second largest in the Solar System, is larger (but less massive) than the planet Mercury and is the only moon in the Solar System that has a substantial atmosphere.

== Name and symbol ==
Saturn is named after the Roman god of wealth and agriculture, who was the father of the god Jupiter. Its astronomical symbol has been traced back to the Greek Oxyrhynchus Papyri, where it can be seen to be a Greek kappa-rho ligature with a horizontal stroke, as an abbreviation for Κρονος (Cronus), the Greek name for the planet. It later came to look like a lower-case Greek eta, with the cross added at the top in the 16th century to Christianize this pagan symbol.

The Romans named the seventh day of the week Saturday, Sāturni diēs, "Saturn's Day", for the planet Saturn.

== Physical characteristics ==
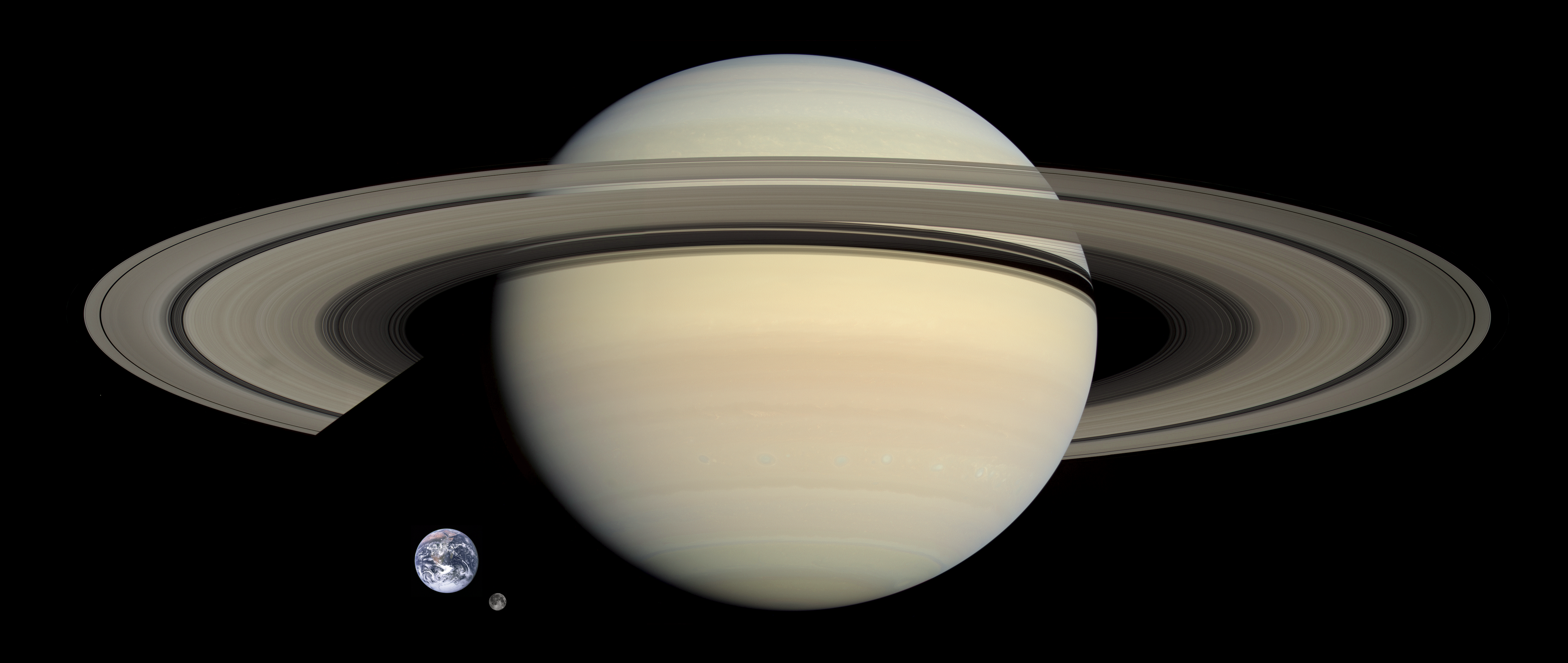
The size of Saturn, compared to Earth and its moon

Saturn is a gas giant, composed predominantly of hydrogen and helium, and lacks a definite surface. Saturn has a "diffuse core", extending 60% of the way to the planet's surface, composed of an indeterminate gradient of rock and ice toward the center. Saturn is the only planet of the Solar System that is less dense than water—about 30% less. The average specific density of the planet is 0.69 g/cm^{3} due to its atmosphere. Jupiter's mass is 318 times Earth's, while Saturn is only 95 times Earth's. Together, Jupiter and Saturn hold 92% of the total planetary mass in the Solar System.

=== Internal structure ===
A diagram of Saturn, to scale

Despite consisting mostly of hydrogen and helium, most of Saturn's mass is not in the gas phase, because hydrogen becomes a non-ideal liquid when the density is above 0.01 g/cm^{3}, which is reached at a radius containing 99.9% of Saturn's mass. The temperature, pressure, and density inside Saturn all rise steadily toward the core, which causes hydrogen to be a metal in the deeper layers.

Standard planetary models suggest that the interior of Saturn is similar to that of Jupiter, having a small rocky core surrounded by hydrogen and helium, with trace amounts of various volatiles. While standard planetary models assume Saturn's basic composition is similar to Jupiter's, its gravitational harmonics and oblateness reveal it to be significantly more centrally condensed, containing a much higher concentration of heavy elements in its deep interior. Saturn's central regions are about 50% hydrogen by mass, and Jupiter's are about 67% hydrogen.

This core is similar in composition to Earth, but is more dense. The examination of Saturn's gravitational moment, in combination with physical models of the interior, has allowed constraints to be placed on the mass of Saturn's core. In 2004, scientists estimated that the core must be 9–22 times the mass of Earth, which corresponds to a diameter of about 20,000 km (12,000 mi). Measurements of Saturn's rings suggest a much more diffuse core, with a mass equal to about 17 Earths and a radius equal to about 60% of Saturn's entire radius. This is surrounded by a thicker, liquid metallic hydrogen layer, followed by a liquid layer of helium-saturated molecular hydrogen, which gradually transitions to a gas as altitude increases. The outermost layer spans about 1,000 km (620 mi) and consists of gas.

Saturn has a hot interior, reaching 11,700 °C (21,100 °F) at its core, and radiates 2.5 times more energy into space than it receives from the Sun. Jupiter's thermal energy is generated by the Kelvin–Helmholtz mechanism of slow gravitational compression; but such a process alone may not be sufficient to explain heat production for Saturn, because it is less massive. An alternative or additional mechanism may be the generation of heat through the "raining out" of droplets of helium deep in Saturn's interior. As the droplets descend through the lower-density hydrogen, the process releases heat by friction and leaves Saturn's outer layers depleted of helium. These descending droplets may have accumulated into a helium shell surrounding the core. Rainfalls of diamonds have been suggested to occur within Saturn, as well as in Jupiter and ice giants Uranus and Neptune.

=== Rotation ===
The visible features on Saturn rotate at different rates depending on latitude, and multiple rotation periods have been assigned to various regions (as in Jupiter's case). Astronomers use three different systems for specifying the rotation rate of Saturn. System I has a period of 10^{h} 14^{m} 00^{s} (844.3°/d) and encompasses the Equatorial Zone, the South Equatorial Belt, and the North Equatorial Belt. The polar regions are considered to have rotation rates similar to System I. All other Saturnian latitudes, excluding the north and south polar regions, are indicated as System II and have been assigned a rotation period of 10^{h} 38^{m} 25.4^{s} (810.76°/d). System III refers to Saturn's internal rotation rate. Based on radio emissions from the planet detected by Voyager 1 and Voyager 2, System III has a rotation period of 10^{h} 39^{m} 22.4^{s} (810.8°/d). System III has largely superseded System II.

A precise value for the rotation period of the interior remains elusive. While approaching Saturn in 2004, Cassini found that the radio rotation period of Saturn had increased appreciably, to approximately 10^{h} 45^{m} 45^{s} ± 36^{s}. An estimate of Saturn's rotation (as an indicated rotation rate for Saturn as a whole) based on a compilation of various measurements from the Cassini, Voyager, and Pioneer probes is 10^{h} 32^{m} 35^{s}. Studies of the planet's C Ring yield a rotation period of 10^{h} 33^{m} 38^{s} ^{+ 1^{m} 52^{s}}_{− 1^{m} 19^{s}}.

In March 2007, it was found that the variation in radio emissions from the planet did not match Saturn's rotation rate. This variance may be caused by geyser activity on Saturn's moon Enceladus. The water vapor emitted into Saturn's orbit by this activity becomes charged and creates a drag upon Saturn's magnetic field, slowing its rotation slightly relative to the rotation of the planet.

==== Oblateness ====
The planet's rotation makes it an oblate spheroid, which is flattened at the poles and bulging at the equator. Its equatorial radius is more than 10% longer than the polar radius: 60,268 km (37,449 mi) versus 54,364 km (33,780 mi). Jupiter, Uranus, and Neptune, the other giant planets in the Solar System, are less oblate. The combination of the bulge and the rotation rate means that the effective surface gravity along the equator, 8.96 m/s^{2} (29.4 ft/s^{2}), is 74% of what it is at the poles and is lower than the surface gravity of Earth. However, the equatorial escape velocity, nearly 36 km/s (22 mi/s; 130,000 km/h; 81,000 mph), is much higher than that of Earth.

=== Atmosphere ===
The outer atmosphere of Saturn contains 96.3% molecular hydrogen and 3.25% helium by volume. The proportion of helium is significantly deficient compared to the abundance of this element in the Sun. The quantity of elements heavier than helium (metallicity) is not known precisely, but the proportions are assumed to match the primordial abundances from the formation of the Solar System. The total mass of these heavier elements is estimated to be 19–31 times the mass of Earth, with a significant fraction located in Saturn's core region.

Trace amounts of ammonia, acetylene, ethane, propane, phosphine, and methane have been detected in Saturn's atmosphere. The upper clouds are composed of ammonia crystals, while the lower level clouds appear to consist of either ammonium hydrosulfide (NH_{4}SH) or water. Ultraviolet radiation from the Sun causes methane photolysis in the upper atmosphere, leading to a series of hydrocarbon chemical reactions with the resulting products being carried downward by eddies and diffusion. This photochemical cycle is modulated by Saturn's annual seasonal cycle. Cassini observed a series of cloud features found in northern latitudes, nicknamed the "String of Pearls". These features are cloud clearings that reside in deeper cloud layers.

==== Cloud layers ====
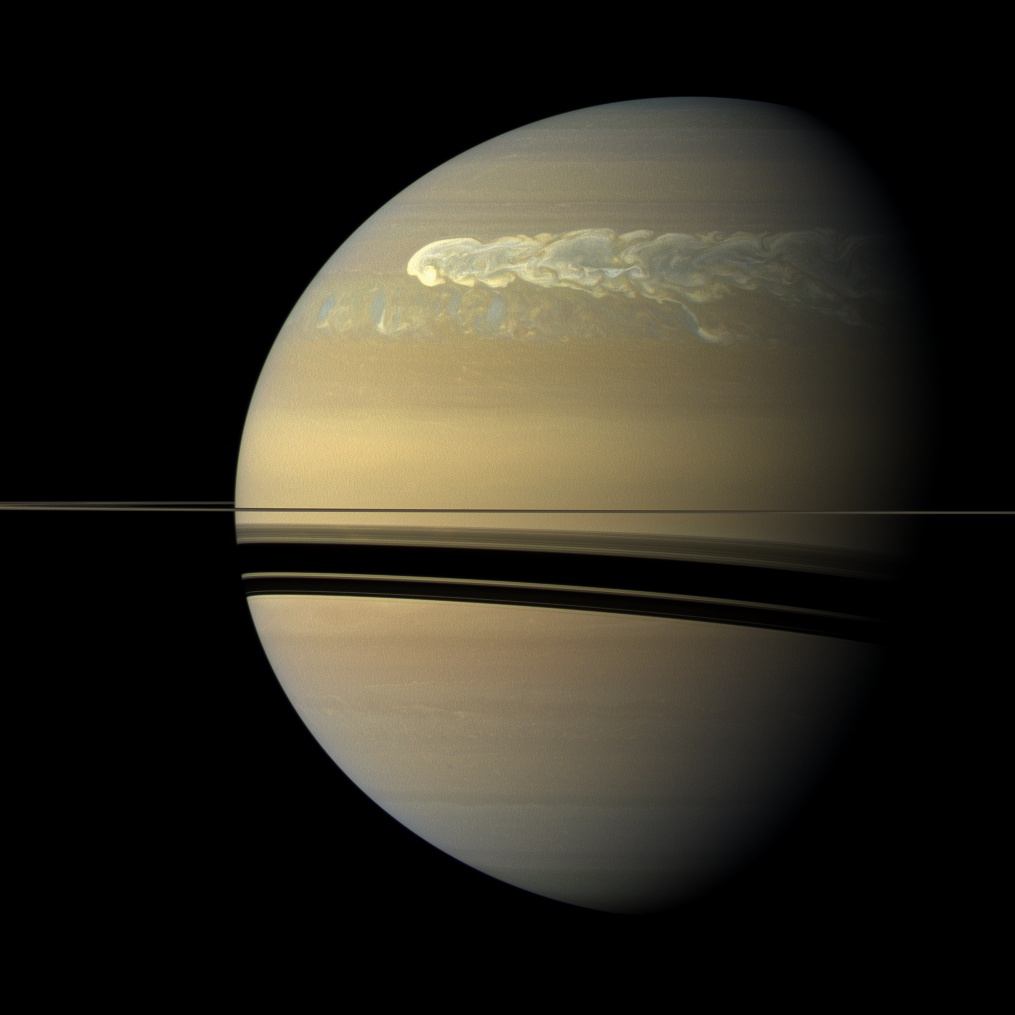
A global storm girdles the planet in 2011. The storm passes around the planet, such that the storm's head (bright area) passes its tail.

Saturn's atmosphere exhibits a banded pattern similar to Jupiter's, but Saturn's bands are much fainter and are much wider near the equator. The nomenclature used to describe these bands is the same as on Jupiter. Saturn's finer cloud patterns were not observed until the flybys of the Voyager spacecraft during the 1980s. Since then, Earth-based telescopy has improved to the point where regular observations can be made.

The composition of the clouds varies with depth and increasing pressure. In the upper cloud layers, with temperatures in the range of 100–160 K and pressures extending between 0.5–2 bar, the clouds consist of ammonia ice. Water ice clouds begin at a level where the pressure is about 2.5 bar and extend down to 9.5 bar, where temperatures range from 185 to 270 K. Intermixed in this layer is a band of ammonium hydrosulfide ice, lying in the pressure range 3–6 bar with temperatures of 190–235 K. The lower layers, where pressures are between 10 and 20 bar and temperatures are 270–330 K, contains a region of water droplets with ammonia in aqueous solution.

Saturn's usually bland atmosphere occasionally exhibits long-lived ovals and other features common on Jupiter. In 1990, the Hubble Space Telescope imaged an enormous white cloud near Saturn's equator that was not present during the Voyager encounters, and in 1994 another smaller storm was observed. The 1990 storm was an example of a Great White Spot, a short-lived phenomenon that occurs once every Saturnian year, roughly every 30 Earth years, around the time of the northern hemisphere's summer solstice.

Previous Great White Spots were observed in 1876, 1903, 1933, and 1960, with the 1933 storm being the best observed. The latest giant storm was observed in 2010. In 2015, researchers used Very Large Array telescope to study Saturnian atmosphere, and reported that they found "long-lasting signatures of all mid-latitude giant storms, a mixture of equatorial storms up to hundreds of years old, and potentially an unreported older storm at 70°N".

The winds on Saturn are the second fastest among the Solar System's planets, after Neptune's. Voyager data indicate peak easterly winds of 500 m/s (1,800 km/h). In images from the Cassini spacecraft during 2007, Saturn's northern hemisphere displayed a bright blue hue, similar to Uranus. The color was most likely caused by Rayleigh scattering. Thermography has shown that Saturn's south pole has a warm polar vortex, the only known example of such a phenomenon in the Solar System. Whereas temperatures on Saturn are normally −185 °C, temperatures on the vortex often reach as high as −122 °C, suspected to be the warmest spot on Saturn.

==== Hexagonal cloud patterns ====
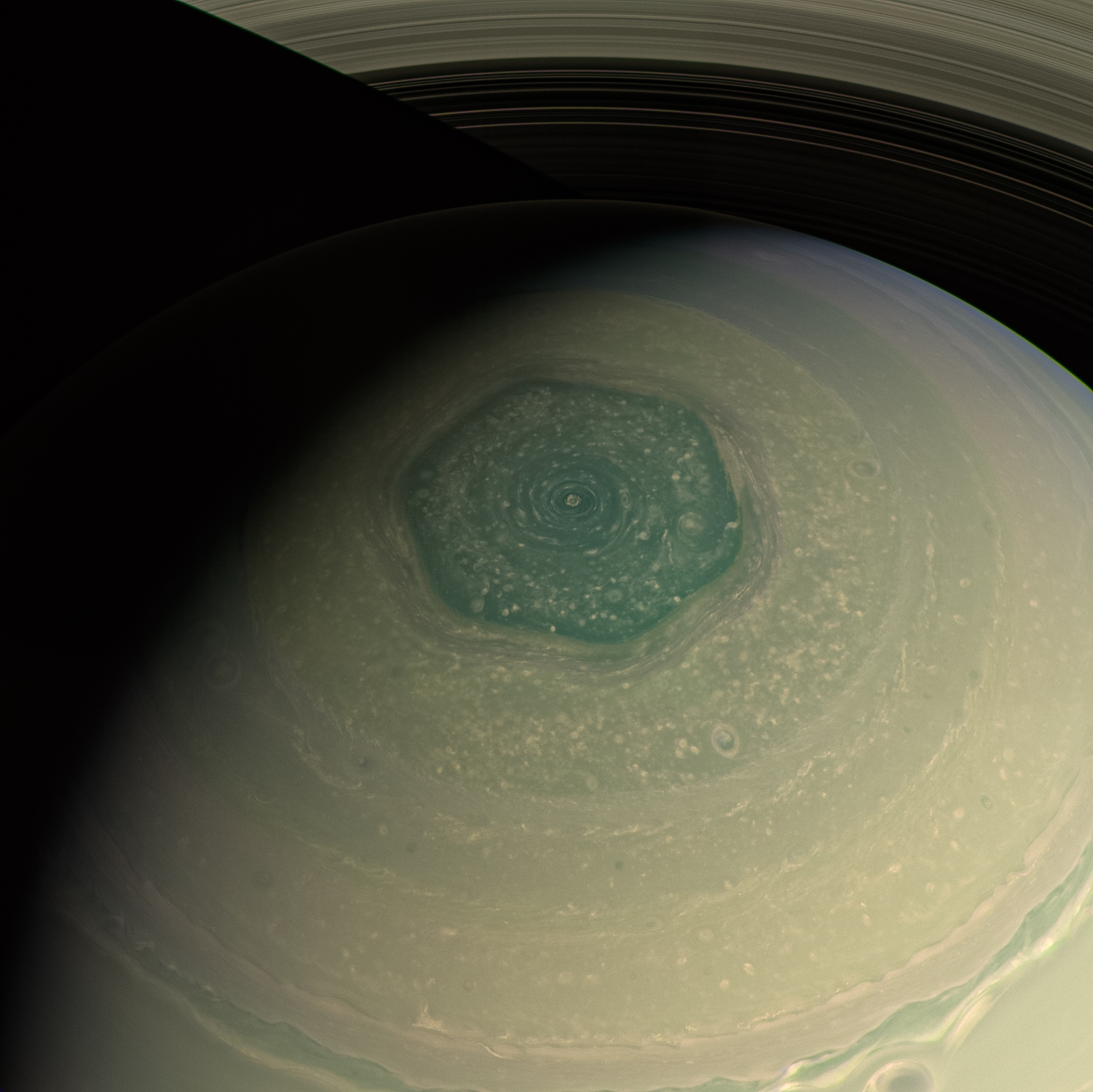
Saturn's north polar hexagon as imaged by the Cassini spacecraft.

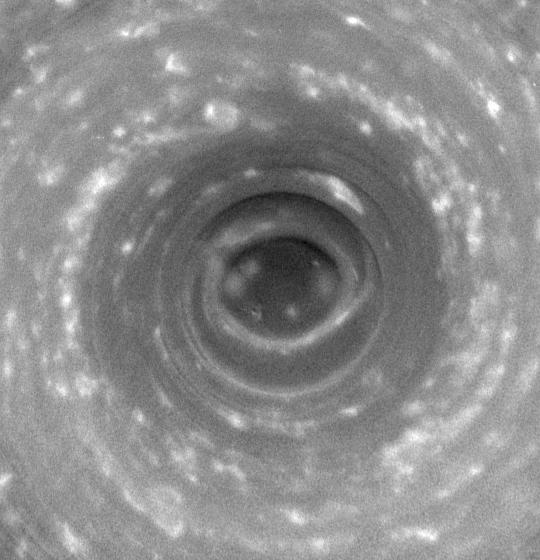
Saturn's north and south pole in infrared

A persisting hexagonal wave pattern around the north polar vortex in the atmosphere at about 78°N was first noted in the Voyager images. The sides of the hexagon are each about 14,500 km (9,000 mi) long, which is longer than the diameter of Earth. The entire structure rotates with a period of 10^{h} 39^{m} 24^{s} (the same period as that of the planet's radio emissions), which is assumed to be equal to the period of rotation of Saturn's interior. The hexagonal feature does not shift in longitude like the other clouds in the visible atmosphere. The pattern's origin is a matter of much speculation. Most scientists think it is a standing wave pattern in the atmosphere. Polygonal shapes have been replicated in the laboratory via differential rotation of fluids.

HST imaging of the south polar region indicates the presence of a jet stream, but no strong polar vortex nor any hexagonal standing wave. NASA reported in November 2006 that Cassini had observed a "hurricane-like" storm locked to the south pole that had a clearly defined eyewall. Eyewall clouds had not previously been seen on any planet other than Earth. For example, images from the Galileo spacecraft did not show an eyewall in the Great Red Spot of Jupiter.

The south pole storm may have been present for billions of years. This vortex is comparable to the size of Earth, and it has winds of 550 km/h.

==== Decagonal cloud patterns ====
Between 2017 and 2023, a ten-sided atmospheric wave began to develop on the south pole. This feature, labelled "the decagon", was discovered via HST observations, and was first reported in September 2026. The decagon is centered around 63°S latitude, with each of its ten sides measuring ~17,000 km, and its apparent position shifts slightly depending upon the wavelength of light observed. Due to its location on the south pole, the decagon is difficult to observe from Earth. The south pole was almost completely hidden from 2012 to 2023 because of Saturn's observed tilt, but thereafter becomes more visible from Earth through each year to 2032.

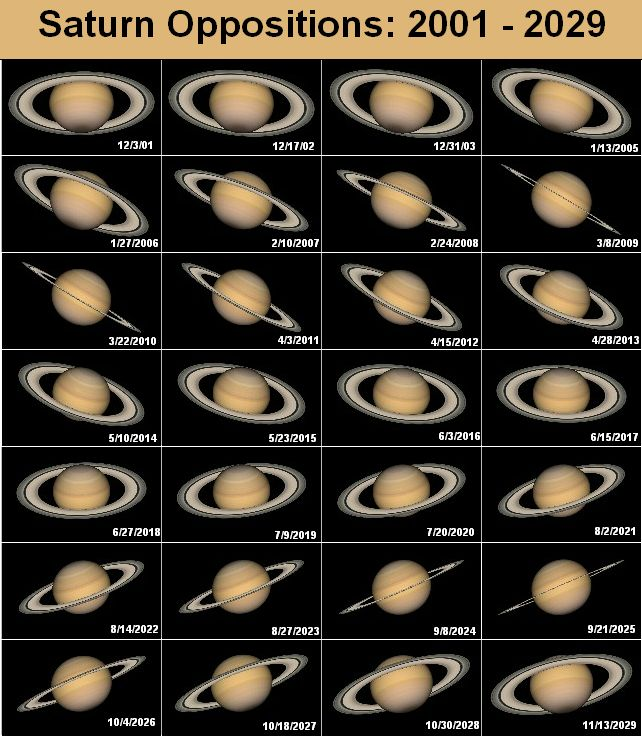
Sequence of simulated views demonstrating 29.5-year orbital period of Saturn by opposition dates and consequent changes in appearance of Saturn's rings which remain on a fixed axis but we see the rings from both sides over one orbit of Saturn around the Sun.

NASA’s Hubble Space Telescope shows a 10-sided wave encircling Saturn’s south pole, labeled “decagon”. An “X” denotes where data was not captured.

=== Magnetosphere ===
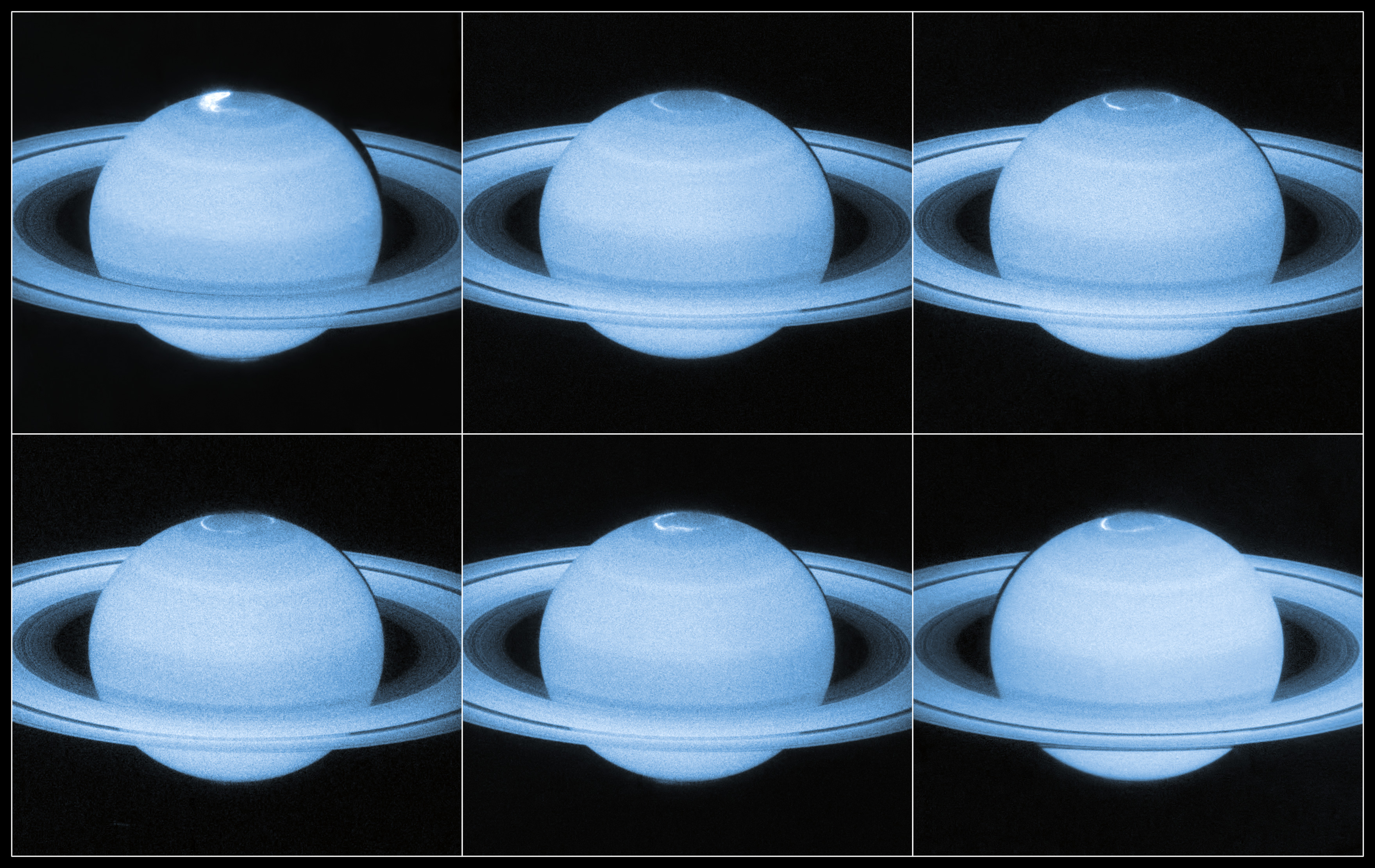
Auroral lights at Saturn's north pole

Saturn has an intrinsic magnetic field that has a simple, symmetric shape—a magnetic dipole. Its strength at the equator—0.2 gauss (20 μT)—is approximately one twentieth of that of the field around Jupiter and slightly weaker than Earth's magnetic field. As a result, Saturn's magnetosphere is much smaller than Jupiter's.

When Voyager 2 entered the magnetosphere, the solar wind pressure was high and the magnetosphere extended only 19 Saturn radii, or 1.1 million km (684,000 mi), although it enlarged within several hours, and remained so for about three days. Most probably, the magnetic field is generated similarly to that of Jupiter—by currents in the liquid metallic-hydrogen layer called a metallic-hydrogen dynamo. This magnetosphere is efficient at deflecting the solar wind particles from the Sun. The moon Titan orbits within the outer part of Saturn's magnetosphere and contributes plasma from the ionized particles in Titan's outer atmosphere. Saturn's magnetosphere, like Earth's, produces aurorae.

== Orbit and observation ==
An animation of Saturn and the Solar System's outer planets orbiting the Sun

The average distance between Saturn and the Sun is over 1.4 billion kilometers (9 AU). With an average orbital speed of 9.68 km/s, it takes Saturn 10,759 Earth days (or about 29 1/2 years) to finish one revolution around the Sun. As a consequence, it forms a near 5:2 mean-motion resonance with Jupiter. The elliptical orbit of Saturn is inclined 2.48° relative to the orbital plane of Earth. The perihelion and aphelion distances are, respectively, 9.195 and 9.957 AU, on average.

Saturn has only one known trojan asteroid, designated 2019 UO14, whose trojan configuration was announced in September 2024, orbiting the Sun at the stable L_{4} Lagrange point 60° ahead of the planet along its orbit. This discovery leaves only Mercury without any known trojans at all. Orbital resonance mechanisms, including secular resonance, are believed to be the cause of the low number of known Saturnian trojans.

=== Observation ===
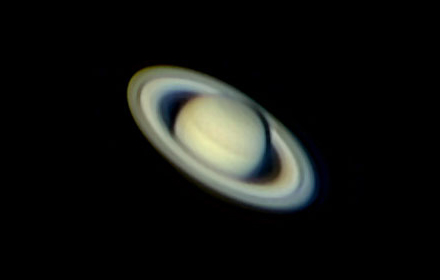
An amateur telescopic view of Saturn

Saturn is the most distant of the five planets which are easily visible to the unaided eye from Earth, the other four being Mercury, Venus, Mars, and Jupiter. (Uranus, and occasionally 4 Vesta, are visible to the unaided eye in dark skies.) Saturn appears to the unaided eye in the night sky as a bright, yellowish point of light. The mean apparent magnitude of Saturn is 0.46, with a standard deviation of 0.34. Most of the magnitude variation is due to the inclination of the ring system relative to the Sun and Earth. The brightest magnitude, −0.55, occurs near the time when the plane of the rings is inclined most highly, and the faintest magnitude, 1.17, occurs around the time when they are least inclined.

It takes approximately 29.4 years for the planet to complete an entire circuit of the ecliptic against the background constellations of the zodiac. Most people will require an optical aid (very large binoculars or a small telescope) that magnifies at least 30 times to achieve an image of Saturn's rings in which a clear resolution is present.

When Earth passes through the ring-plane, which occurs twice every Saturnian year (roughly every 15 Earth-years), the rings briefly disappear from view because they are so thin. Such a "disappearance" most recently occurred in 2025, but Saturn was too close to the Sun for observations.

A simulated appearance of Saturn as seen from Earth (at opposition) during an orbit of Saturn, 2001–2029

Saturn and its rings are best seen when the planet is at, or near, opposition, the configuration of a planet when it is at an elongation of 180°, and thus appears opposite the Sun in the sky. A Saturnian opposition occurs every year— approximately every 378 days, and results in the planet appearing at its brightest. Both Earth and Saturn orbit the Sun on eccentric orbits, which means that their distances from the Sun vary over time, and therefore so do their distances from each other, hence varying the brightness of Saturn from one opposition to the next. Saturn also appears brighter when the rings are angled such that they are more visible. For example, during the opposition of 17 December 2002, Saturn appeared at its brightest due to the favorable orientation of its rings relative to Earth, even though Saturn was closer to Earth and the Sun in late 2003.

From time to time, Saturn is occulted by the Moon (that is, the Moon covers up Saturn in the sky). As with all the planets in the Solar System, occultations of Saturn occur in "seasons". Saturnian occultations will take place monthly for about a 12-month period, followed by about a five-year period in which no such activity is registered. The Moon's orbit is inclined by several degrees relative to Saturn's, so occultations will only occur when Saturn is near one of the points in the sky where the two planes intersect (both the length of Saturn's year and the 18.6-Earth-year nodal precession period of the Moon's orbit influence the periodicity).

== Natural satellites ==
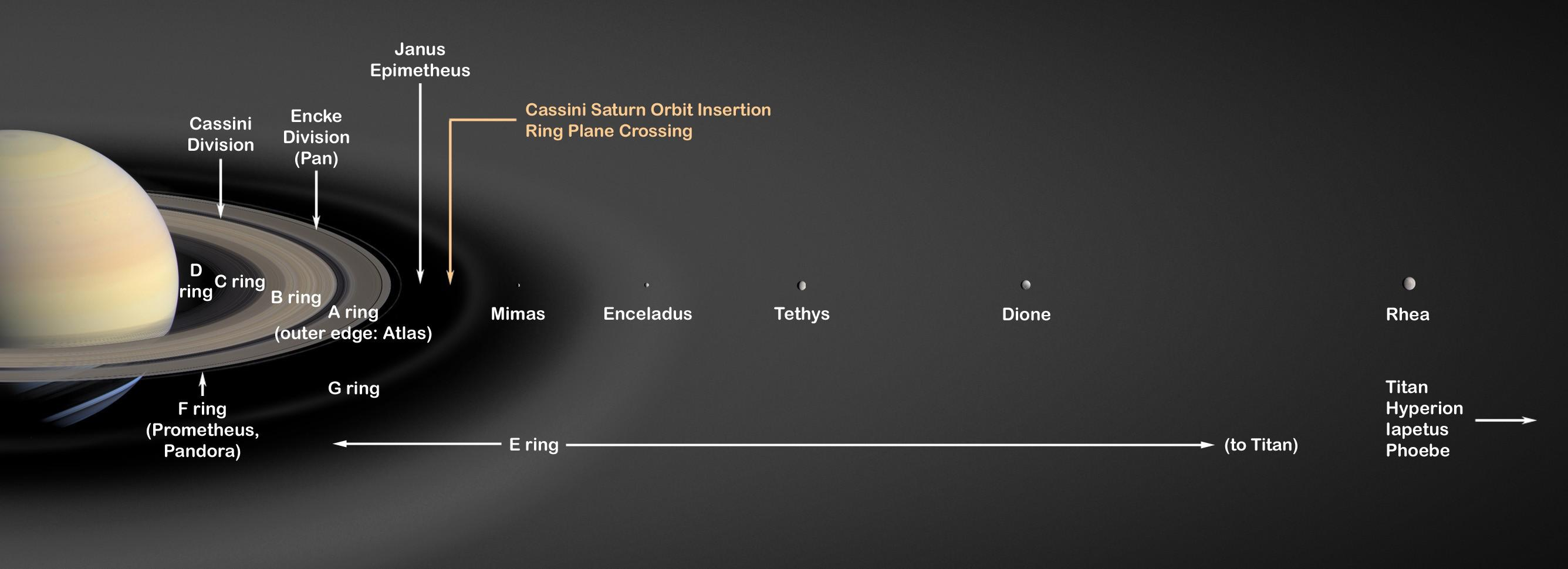
An artist conception of Saturn, its rings and major icy moons—from Mimas to Rhea

Saturn has 293 known moons, 63 of which have formal names. There is evidence of dozens to hundreds of moonlets with diameters of 40–500 meters in Saturn's rings, which are not considered to be true moons. Titan, the largest moon, comprises more than 90% of the mass in orbit around Saturn, including the rings. Saturn's second-largest moon, Rhea, may have a tenuous ring system of its own, along with a tenuous atmosphere.

Many of the other moons are small: 143 are less than 50 km in diameter. Traditionally, most of Saturn's moons have been named after Titans of Greek mythology. Titan is the only satellite in the Solar System with a major atmosphere, in which a complex organic chemistry occurs. It is the only satellite with hydrocarbon lakes.

On 6 June 2013, scientists at the IAA-CSIC reported the detection of polycyclic aromatic hydrocarbons in the upper atmosphere of Titan, a possible precursor for life. On 23 June 2014, NASA claimed to have strong evidence that nitrogen in the atmosphere of Titan came from materials in the Oort cloud, associated with comets, and not from the materials that formed Saturn in earlier times.

Saturn's moon Enceladus, which seems similar in chemical makeup to comets, has often been regarded as a potential habitat for microbial life. Evidence of this possibility includes the satellite's salt-rich particles having an "ocean-like" composition that indicates most of Enceladus's expelled ice comes from the evaporation of liquid salt water. A 2015 flyby by Cassini through a plume on Enceladus found most of the ingredients to sustain life forms that live by methanogenesis.

In April 2014, NASA scientists reported the possible beginning of a new moon within the A Ring, nicknamed Peggy, which was imaged by Cassini on 15 April 2013.

== Planetary rings ==
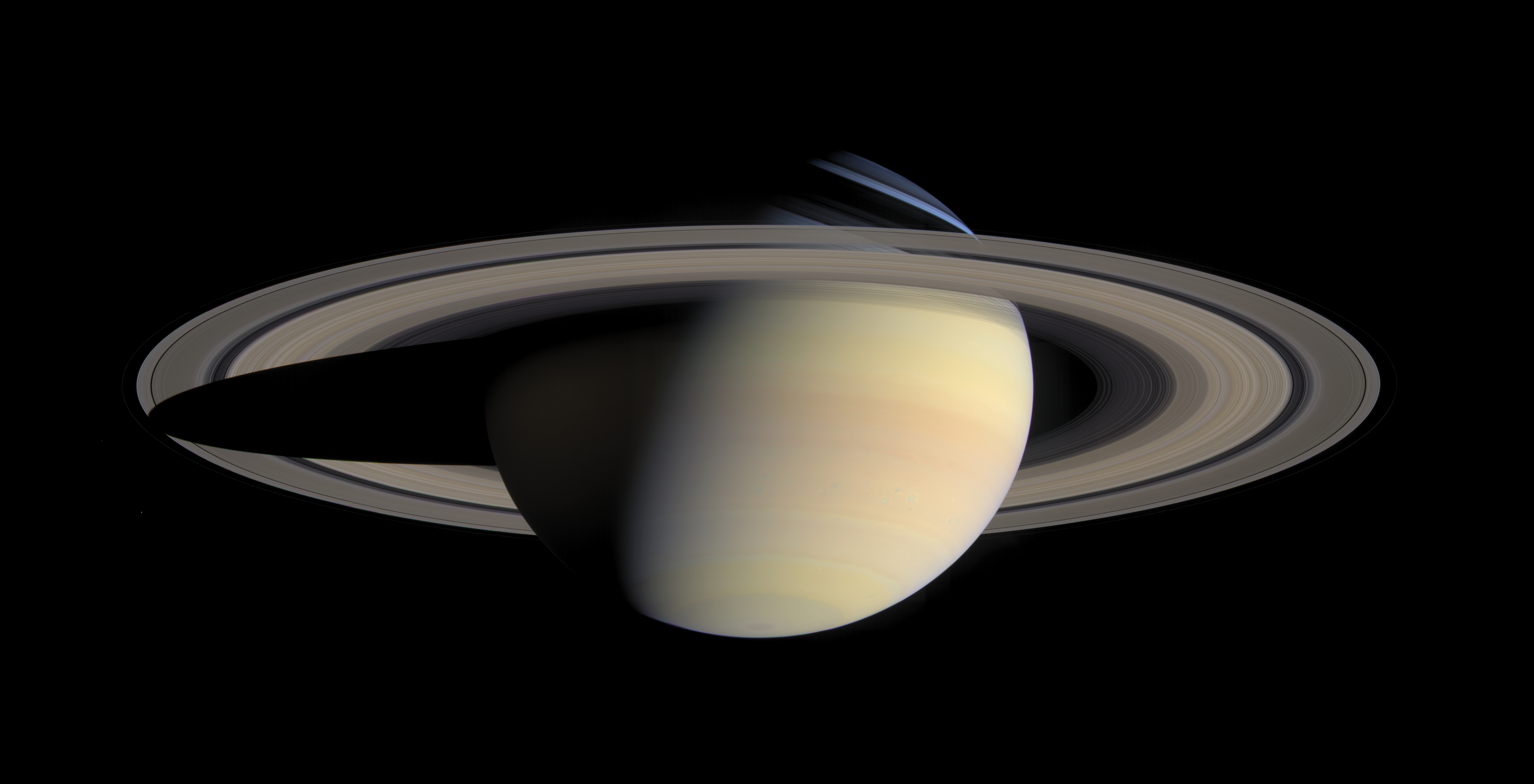
The rings of Saturn, imaged here by Cassini in October 2004, are the most massive and conspicuous in the Solar System.

Saturn is probably best known for the system of planetary rings that makes it visually unique. The rings extend from 6,630 to 120,700 kilometers (4,120 to 75,000 mi) outward from Saturn's equator and average approximately 20 meters (66 ft) in thickness. They are composed predominantly of water ice, with trace amounts of tholin impurities and a peppered coating of approximately 7% amorphous carbon. The particles that make up the rings range in size from specks of dust up to 10 m. While the other gas giants also have ring systems, Saturn's is the largest and most visible.

There is a debate on the age of the rings. One side supports that they are ancient, and were created simultaneously with Saturn from the original nebular material (around 4.6 billion years ago), or shortly after the LHB (around 4.1 to 3.8 billion years ago). The other side supports that they are much younger, created around 100 million years ago. An MIT research team, supporting the latter theory, proposed that the rings are remnant of a destroyed moon of Saturn, named "Chrysalis".

Beyond the main rings, at a distance of 12 million km (7.5 million mi) from the planet is the sparse Phoebe ring. It is tilted at an angle of 27° to the other rings and, like Phoebe, orbits in retrograde fashion.

Some of the moons of Saturn, including Pandora and Prometheus, act as shepherd moons to confine the rings and prevent them from spreading out. Pan and Atlas cause weak, linear density waves in Saturn's rings that have yielded more reliable calculations of their masses.

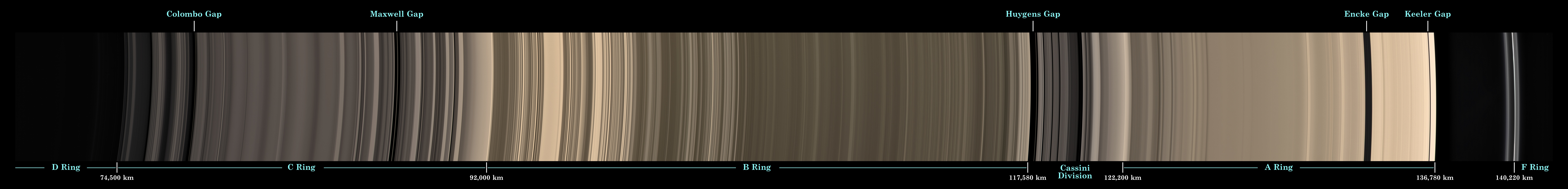
A natural-color mosaic of Cassini narrow-angle camera images of the unilluminated side of Saturn's D, C, B, A, and F rings (left to right), taken on 9 May 2007. Distances are to Saturn's center.

== History of observation and exploration ==
The observation and exploration of Saturn can be divided into three phases: (1) pre-modern observations with the naked eye, (2) telescopic observations from Earth beginning in the 17th century, and (3) visitation by space probes, in orbit or on flyby. In the 21st century, telescopic observations continue from Earth (including Earth-orbiting observatories like the Hubble Space Telescope) and, until its 2017 retirement, from the Cassini orbiter around Saturn.

=== Pre-telescopic observation ===
Saturn has been known since prehistoric times, and in early recorded history it was a major character in various mythologies. Babylonian astronomers systematically observed and recorded the movements of Saturn. In ancient Greek, the planet was known as Φαίνων Phainon, and in Roman times it was known as the "star of Saturn" or the "star of the Sun (i.e. Helios)". In ancient Roman mythology, the planet Phainon was sacred to this agricultural god, from which the planet takes its modern name. The Romans considered the god Saturnus the equivalent of the Greek god Cronus. In modern Greek, the planet retains the name Cronus—Κρόνος: Kronos.

The Greek scientist Ptolemy based his calculations of Saturn's orbit on observations he made while it was in opposition. In Hindu astrology, there are nine astrological objects, known as Navagrahas. Saturn is known as "Shani" and judges everyone based on the good and bad deeds performed in life. Ancient Chinese and Japanese culture designated the planet Saturn as the "earth star" or "soil star" (土星). This was based on Five Elements which were traditionally used to classify natural elements.

In Hebrew, Saturn is called Shabbathai. Its angel is Cassiel. Its intelligence or beneficial spirit is 'Agȋȇl (Hebrew: אגיאל, romanized: ʿAgyal), and its darker spirit (demon) is Zȃzȇl (Hebrew: זאזל, romanized: Zazl). Zazel has been described as a great angel, invoked in Solomonic magic, who is "effective in love conjurations". In Ottoman Turkish, Urdu, and Malay, the name of Zazel is 'Zuhal', derived from the Arabic language (Arabic: زحل, romanized: Zuhal).

=== Telescopic pre-spaceflight observations ===
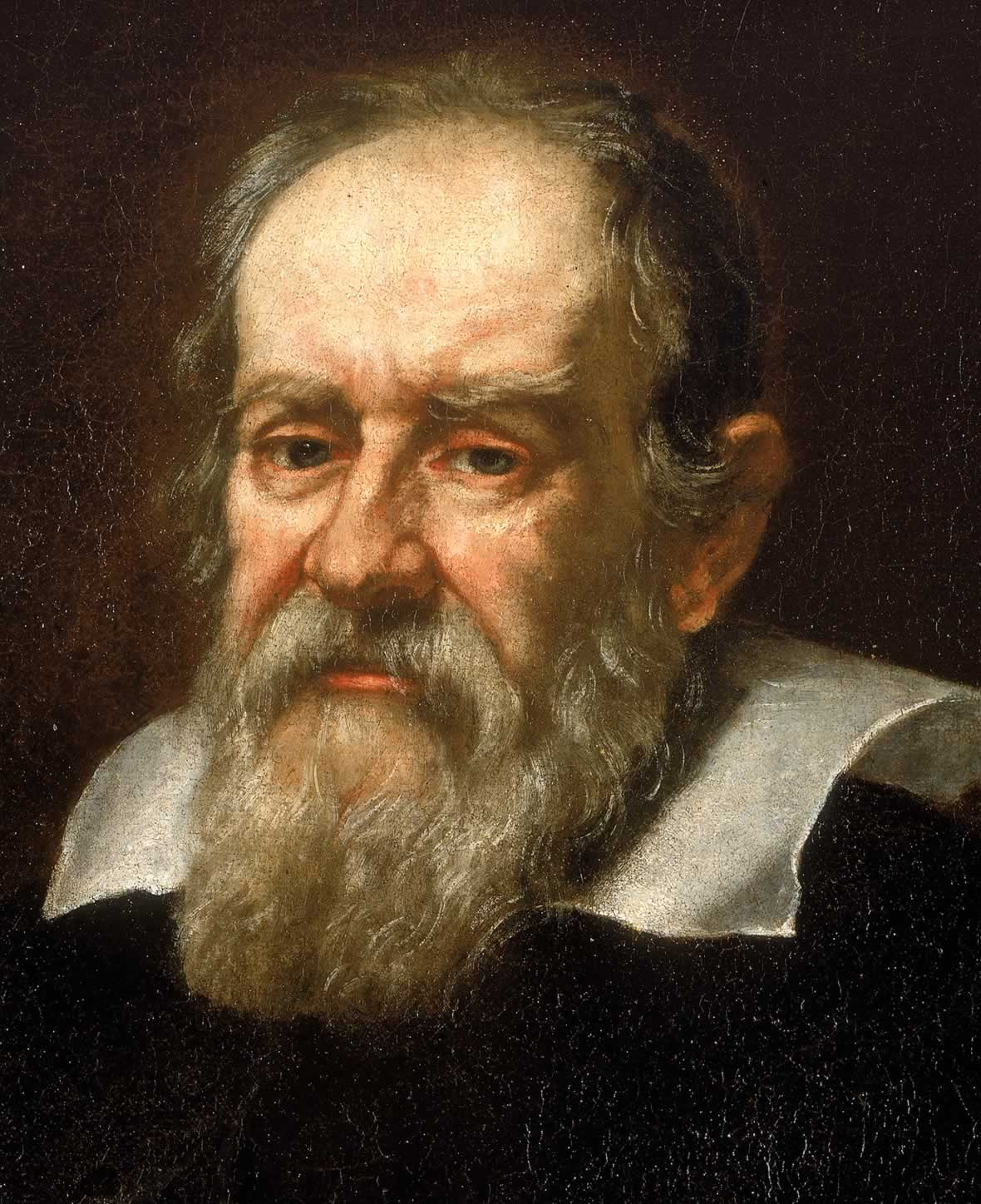
Galileo Galilei observed the rings of Saturn in 1610, but was unable to determine what they were.

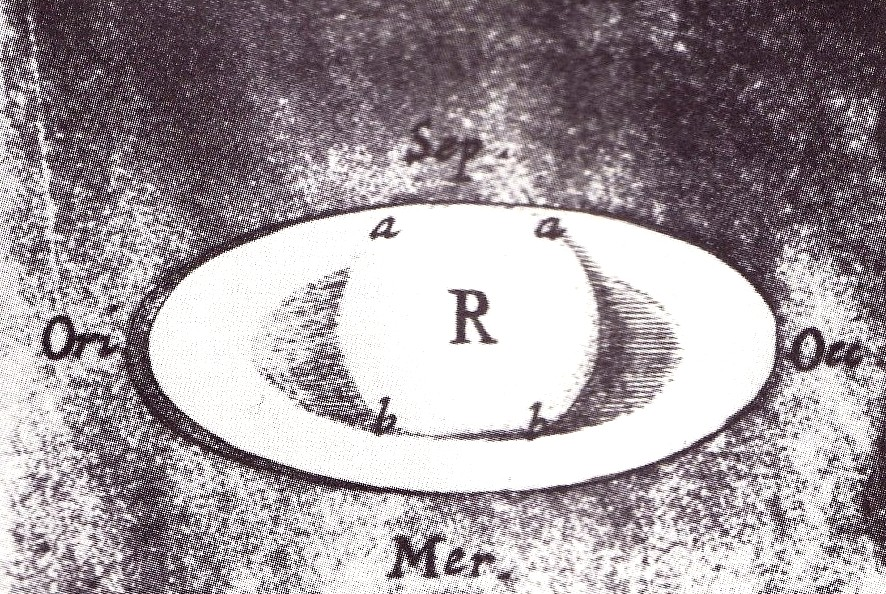
Robert Hooke noted the shadows (a and b) cast by both the globe and the rings on each other in this drawing of Saturn in 1666.

Saturn's rings require at least a 15-mm-diameter telescope to resolve and were not known to exist until Christiaan Huygens saw them in 1655 and published his observations in 1659. Galileo, with his primitive telescope in 1610, incorrectly thought of Saturn's appearing not quite round as two moons on Saturn's sides.

When Huygens used greater telescopic magnification this notion was refuted, and the rings were truly seen for the first time. Huygens discovered Saturn's moon Titan. Giovanni Domenico Cassini later discovered four other moons: Iapetus, Rhea, Tethys, and Dione. In 1675, Cassini discovered the gap now known as the Cassini Division.

No further discoveries of significance were made until 1789 when William Herschel discovered two further moons, Mimas and Enceladus. The irregularly shaped satellite Hyperion, which has a resonance with Titan, was discovered in 1848 by a British team.

In 1899, William Henry Pickering discovered Phoebe, a highly irregular satellite that does not rotate synchronously with Saturn as the larger moons do. Phoebe was the first such satellite found and it took more than a year to orbit Saturn in a retrograde orbit. During the early 20th century, research on Titan led to the confirmation in 1944 that it had a thick atmosphere—a feature unique among the Solar System's moons.

=== Spaceflight missions ===
==== Pioneer 11 flyby ====
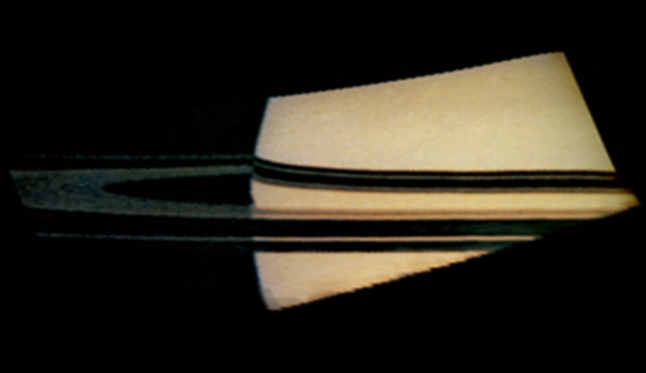
Pioneer 11 image of Saturn

Pioneer 11 made the first flyby of Saturn in September 1979, when it passed within 20,000 km (12,000 mi) of the planet's cloud tops. Images were taken of the planet and a few of its moons, although their resolution was too low to discern surface detail. The spacecraft also studied Saturn's rings, revealing the thin F-ring and the fact that dark gaps in the rings are bright when viewed at a high phase angle (towards the Sun), meaning that they contain fine light-scattering material. In addition, Pioneer 11 measured the temperature of Titan.

==== Voyager flybys ====
In November 1980, the Voyager 1 probe visited the Saturn system. It sent back the first high-resolution images of the planet, its rings and satellites. Surface features of various moons were seen for the first time. Voyager 1 performed a close flyby of Titan, increasing knowledge of the atmosphere of the moon. It proved that Titan's atmosphere is impenetrable at visible wavelengths; therefore no surface details were seen. The flyby changed the spacecraft's trajectory out of the plane of the Solar System.

Almost a year later, in August 1981, Voyager 2 continued the study of the Saturn system. More close-up images of Saturn's moons were acquired, as well as evidence of changes in the atmosphere and the rings. During the flyby, the probe's turnable camera platform stuck for a couple of days and some planned imaging was lost. Saturn's gravity was used to direct the spacecraft's trajectory towards Uranus.

The probes discovered and confirmed several new satellites orbiting near or within the planet's rings, as well as the small Maxwell Gap (a gap within the C Ring) and Keeler gap (a 42 km-wide gap in the A Ring).

==== Cassini–Huygens spacecraft ====
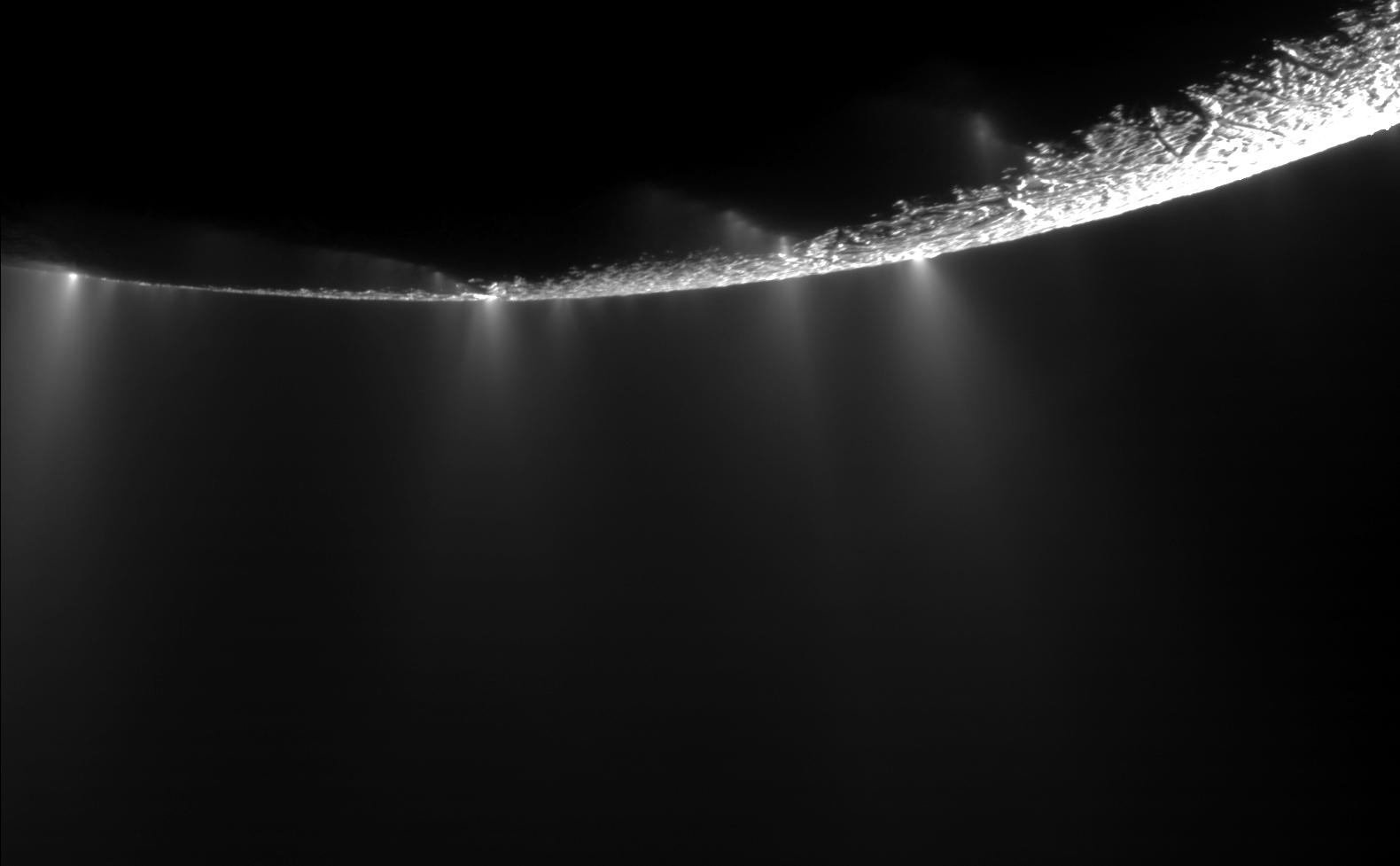
At Enceladus's south pole, geysers spray water from many locations along the tiger stripes.

The Cassini–Huygens space probe entered orbit around Saturn on 1 July 2004. In June 2004, it conducted a close flyby of Phoebe, sending back high-resolution images and data. Cassini's flyby of Saturn's largest moon, Titan, captured radar images of large lakes and their coastlines with numerous islands and mountains. The orbiter completed two Titan flybys before releasing the Huygens probe on 25 December 2004. Huygens descended onto the surface of Titan on 14 January 2005.

Starting in early 2005, scientists used Cassini to track lightning on Saturn. The power of the lightning is approximately 1,000 times that of lightning on Earth.

In 2006, NASA reported that Cassini had found evidence of liquid water reservoirs no more than tens of meters below the surface that erupt in geysers on Saturn's moon Enceladus. These jets of icy particles are emitted into orbit around Saturn from vents in the moon's south polar region. Over 100 geysers have been identified on Enceladus. In May 2011, NASA scientists reported that Enceladus "is emerging as the most habitable spot beyond Earth in the Solar System for life as we know it".

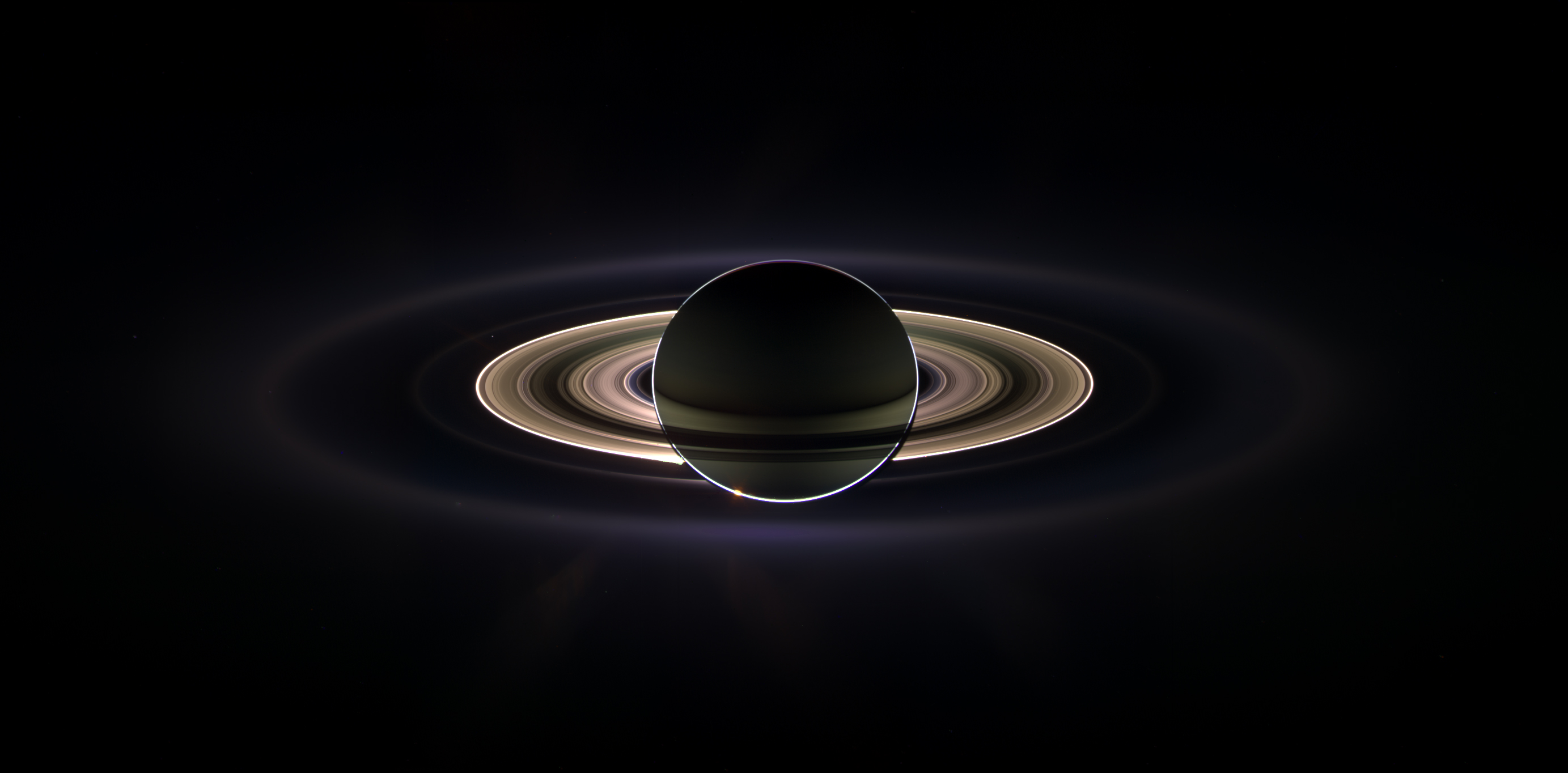
Saturn eclipses the Sun, as seen from Cassini. The rings are visible, including the F Ring.

Cassini photographs have revealed a previously undiscovered planetary ring, outside the brighter main rings of Saturn and inside the G and E rings. The source of this ring is hypothesized to be the crashing of a meteoroid off Janus and Epimetheus. In July 2006, images were returned of hydrocarbon lakes near Titan's north pole, the presence of which were confirmed in January 2007. In March 2007, hydrocarbon seas were found near the North pole, the largest of which is almost the size of the Caspian Sea. In October 2006, the probe detected an 8,000 km (5,000 mi) diameter cyclone-like storm with an eyewall at Saturn's south pole.

From 2004 to 2 November 2009, the probe discovered and confirmed eight new satellites. In April 2013, Cassini sent back images of a hurricane at the planet's north pole 20 times larger than those found on Earth, with winds faster than 530 km/h (330 mph). On 15 September 2017, the Cassini–Huygens spacecraft performed the "Grand Finale" of its mission: a number of passes through gaps between Saturn and Saturn's inner rings. The atmospheric entry of Cassini ended the mission.

==== Possible future missions ====
NASA's Dragonfly mission—the fourth in the New Frontiers program—is a rotorcraft probe designed to explore Saturn's moon Titan, and to search for signs of prebiotic chemical processes. NASA selected the mission in 2019; as of 2025, it is scheduled for launch in July 2028 with a total lifecycle cost of $3.35 billion. It would arrive at Titan in 2034. By April 2025, the mission had passed its Critical Design Review. It is planned to launch on a SpaceX Falcon Heavy rocket from Kennedy Space Center.

== In fiction ==
Saturn has frequently appeared in fiction since at least 1752, when Voltaire published his novel Micromégas. Early works generally depicted it as solid, whereas Saturn is later correctly described as a gaseous planet. Saturn's moons are also featured in fiction, especially Titan.

== See also ==
- Moons of Saturn
- Statistics of planets in the Solar System
- Outline of Saturn
