= Michel de Souza =

Brazilian operatic baritone

Michel de Souza is a Brazilian operatic baritone.

Michel de Souza was born in Petrópolis, Brazil. He studied organ and singing at the Federal University of Rio de Janeiro.

With The Royal Opera, de Souza is singing the role of Baron Douphol in Verdi's La traviata in 2014.
