= List of minor planets: 689001–690000 =

The following is a partial list of minor planets, running from minor-planet number 689001 through 690000, inclusive. The primary data for this and other partial lists is based on JPL's "Small-Body Orbital Elements" and data available from the Minor Planet Center. Critical list information is also provided by the MPC, unless otherwise specified from Lowell Observatory. A detailed description of the table's columns and additional sources are given on the main page including a complete list of every page in this series, and a statistical break-up on the dynamical classification of minor planets.

Also see the summary list of all named bodies in numerical and alphabetical order, and the corresponding naming citations for the number range of this particular list. New namings may only be added to this list after official publication, as the preannouncement of names is condemned by the Working Group for Small Bodies Nomenclature of the International Astronomical Union.

Near-Earth obj.	MBA (inner)	MBA (outer)	Centaur
Mars-crosser	MBA (middle)	Jupiter trojan	Trans-Neptunian obj.
Unclassified

== 689001–689100 ==
Designation			Discovery			Properties		Ref
Permanent	Provisional	Named after	Date	Site	Discoverer(s)	Category	Diam.	Ref
689001	2013 CB_{21}	—	February 11, 2004	Kitt Peak	Spacewatch	·	1.8 km	MPC · JPL
689002	2013 CA_{24}	—	February 2, 2013	Kitt Peak	Spacewatch	·	1.7 km	MPC · JPL
689003	2013 CD_{27}	—	February 3, 2013	Haleakala	Pan-STARRS 1	MAS	490 m	MPC · JPL
689004	2013 CS_{28}	—	February 7, 2006	Kitt Peak	Spacewatch	·	580 m	MPC · JPL
689005	2013 CE_{29}	—	February 5, 2013	Oukaïmeden	C. Rinner	·	1.1 km	MPC · JPL
689006	2013 CX_{37}	—	January 21, 2013	Haleakala	Pan-STARRS 1	H	490 m	MPC · JPL
689007	2013 CG_{41}	—	October 11, 2007	Lulin	LUSS	·	1.3 km	MPC · JPL
689008	2013 CO_{41}	—	September 20, 2011	Kitt Peak	Spacewatch	·	1.3 km	MPC · JPL
689009	2013 CF_{42}	—	March 9, 2008	Kitt Peak	Spacewatch	·	1.4 km	MPC · JPL
689010	2013 CS_{42}	—	December 23, 2012	Haleakala	Pan-STARRS 1	KOR	1.2 km	MPC · JPL
689011	2013 CW_{42}	—	February 5, 2013	Kitt Peak	Spacewatch	L4	5.9 km	MPC · JPL
689012	2013 CK_{45}	—	October 23, 2011	Kitt Peak	Spacewatch	·	1.4 km	MPC · JPL
689013	2013 CR_{48}	—	November 13, 2006	Mount Lemmon	Mount Lemmon Survey	·	1.4 km	MPC · JPL
689014	2013 CG_{52}	—	November 17, 2008	Kitt Peak	Spacewatch	·	650 m	MPC · JPL
689015	2013 CK_{55}	—	November 17, 2006	Mount Lemmon	Mount Lemmon Survey	·	1.9 km	MPC · JPL
689016	2013 CQ_{57}	—	October 22, 2008	Kitt Peak	Spacewatch	·	630 m	MPC · JPL
689017	2013 CF_{59}	—	January 10, 2013	Haleakala	Pan-STARRS 1	·	500 m	MPC · JPL
689018	2013 CG_{60}	—	February 3, 2013	Haleakala	Pan-STARRS 1	·	2.8 km	MPC · JPL
689019	2013 CN_{61}	—	February 5, 2013	Kitt Peak	Spacewatch	DOR	1.9 km	MPC · JPL
689020	2013 CA_{64}	—	March 24, 2009	Kitt Peak	Spacewatch	·	1.7 km	MPC · JPL
689021	2013 CX_{67}	—	October 2, 2008	Kitt Peak	Spacewatch	·	590 m	MPC · JPL
689022	2013 CF_{73}	—	July 3, 2003	Kitt Peak	Spacewatch	·	1.3 km	MPC · JPL
689023	2013 CS_{74}	—	January 9, 2013	Kitt Peak	Spacewatch	PHO	600 m	MPC · JPL
689024	2013 CX_{74}	—	February 5, 2013	Mount Lemmon	Mount Lemmon Survey	·	780 m	MPC · JPL
689025	2013 CM_{79}	—	January 17, 2013	Haleakala	Pan-STARRS 1	·	2.1 km	MPC · JPL
689026	2013 CH_{88}	—	February 11, 2013	Catalina	CSS	H	470 m	MPC · JPL
689027	2013 CC_{89}	—	February 13, 2013	Haleakala	Pan-STARRS 1	H	390 m	MPC · JPL
689028	2013 CN_{91}	—	February 8, 2013	Haleakala	Pan-STARRS 1	THM	1.7 km	MPC · JPL
689029	2013 CE_{92}	—	July 11, 1997	Kitt Peak	Spacewatch	·	1.6 km	MPC · JPL
689030	2013 CH_{92}	—	January 9, 2013	Kitt Peak	Spacewatch	NYS	560 m	MPC · JPL
689031	2013 CX_{93}	—	February 13, 2008	Kitt Peak	Spacewatch	·	1.5 km	MPC · JPL
689032	2013 CF_{94}	—	February 8, 2013	Haleakala	Pan-STARRS 1	·	1.5 km	MPC · JPL
689033	2013 CB_{95}	—	February 8, 2013	Haleakala	Pan-STARRS 1	·	1.2 km	MPC · JPL
689034	2013 CE_{95}	—	October 11, 2007	Mount Lemmon	Mount Lemmon Survey	(5)	920 m	MPC · JPL
689035	2013 CJ_{95}	—	February 20, 2006	Mount Lemmon	Mount Lemmon Survey	·	750 m	MPC · JPL
689036	2013 CO_{97}	—	February 8, 2013	Haleakala	Pan-STARRS 1	·	1.6 km	MPC · JPL
689037	2013 CK_{98}	—	February 8, 2013	Haleakala	Pan-STARRS 1	·	700 m	MPC · JPL
689038	2013 CM_{100}	—	August 10, 2005	Cerro Tololo	Deep Ecliptic Survey	·	1.6 km	MPC · JPL
689039	2013 CL_{101}	—	February 8, 2013	Haleakala	Pan-STARRS 1	·	1.8 km	MPC · JPL
689040	2013 CH_{102}	—	February 28, 2008	Mount Lemmon	Mount Lemmon Survey	·	1.4 km	MPC · JPL
689041	2013 CP_{107}	—	September 23, 2011	Haleakala	Pan-STARRS 1	·	1.7 km	MPC · JPL
689042	2013 CE_{108}	—	February 6, 2013	Kitt Peak	Spacewatch	·	1.5 km	MPC · JPL
689043	2013 CJ_{108}	—	January 17, 2013	Mount Lemmon	Mount Lemmon Survey	·	1.6 km	MPC · JPL
689044	2013 CO_{109}	—	February 9, 2013	Haleakala	Pan-STARRS 1	EOS	1.4 km	MPC · JPL
689045	2013 CO_{111}	—	September 17, 2006	Kitt Peak	Spacewatch	·	1.7 km	MPC · JPL
689046	2013 CM_{113}	—	February 10, 2013	Nogales	M. Schwartz, P. R. Holvorcem	·	2.6 km	MPC · JPL
689047	2013 CQ_{115}	—	January 9, 2013	Kitt Peak	Spacewatch	·	2.5 km	MPC · JPL
689048	2013 CN_{117}	—	February 13, 2013	ESA OGS	ESA OGS	·	790 m	MPC · JPL
689049	2013 CR_{120}	—	February 8, 2013	Mount Lemmon	Mount Lemmon Survey	·	1.7 km	MPC · JPL
689050	2013 CJ_{125}	—	August 8, 2005	Cerro Tololo	Deep Ecliptic Survey	·	1.7 km	MPC · JPL
689051	2013 CL_{130}	—	February 12, 2000	Apache Point	SDSS	·	1.5 km	MPC · JPL
689052	2013 CO_{131}	—	February 14, 2013	Kitt Peak	Spacewatch	EOS	1.3 km	MPC · JPL
689053	2013 CX_{134}	—	February 12, 2013	ESA OGS	ESA OGS	EOS	1.3 km	MPC · JPL
689054	2013 CQ_{135}	—	January 1, 2008	Kitt Peak	Spacewatch	·	1.8 km	MPC · JPL
689055	2013 CB_{136}	—	January 14, 2013	Mount Lemmon	Mount Lemmon Survey	·	2.0 km	MPC · JPL
689056	2013 CN_{140}	—	February 14, 2013	Kitt Peak	Spacewatch	·	560 m	MPC · JPL
689057	2013 CK_{141}	—	September 17, 2006	Kitt Peak	Spacewatch	·	1.4 km	MPC · JPL
689058	2013 CR_{141}	—	February 14, 2013	Kitt Peak	Spacewatch	·	2.3 km	MPC · JPL
689059	2013 CG_{142}	—	November 3, 2011	Mount Lemmon	Mount Lemmon Survey	·	1.6 km	MPC · JPL
689060	2013 CK_{144}	—	September 2, 2010	Mount Lemmon	Mount Lemmon Survey	NAE	2.0 km	MPC · JPL
689061	2013 CP_{144}	—	February 14, 2013	Kitt Peak	Spacewatch	V	430 m	MPC · JPL
689062	2013 CL_{145}	—	January 9, 2013	Kitt Peak	Spacewatch	MAS	520 m	MPC · JPL
689063	2013 CP_{145}	—	February 14, 2013	Kitt Peak	Spacewatch	L4	6.6 km	MPC · JPL
689064	2013 CP_{147}	—	February 14, 2013	Kitt Peak	Spacewatch	·	600 m	MPC · JPL
689065	2013 CZ_{147}	—	April 23, 2009	Kitt Peak	Spacewatch	·	1.5 km	MPC · JPL
689066	2013 CW_{150}	—	February 14, 2013	Kitt Peak	Spacewatch	·	1.8 km	MPC · JPL
689067	2013 CF_{151}	—	December 30, 2007	Kitt Peak	Spacewatch	HOF	2.1 km	MPC · JPL
689068	2013 CG_{151}	—	February 5, 2013	Kitt Peak	Spacewatch	·	840 m	MPC · JPL
689069	2013 CF_{153}	—	February 14, 2013	Haleakala	Pan-STARRS 1	V	540 m	MPC · JPL
689070	2013 CW_{153}	—	August 30, 2005	Kitt Peak	Spacewatch	·	2.0 km	MPC · JPL
689071	2013 CK_{154}	—	August 18, 2006	Kitt Peak	Spacewatch	·	1.5 km	MPC · JPL
689072	2013 CQ_{154}	—	August 10, 2007	Kitt Peak	Spacewatch	L4	6.2 km	MPC · JPL
689073	2013 CL_{155}	—	January 19, 2013	Mount Lemmon	Mount Lemmon Survey	·	1.6 km	MPC · JPL
689074	2013 CY_{157}	—	November 24, 2011	Piszkés-tető	K. Sárneczky, G. Marton	EOS	1.4 km	MPC · JPL
689075	2013 CE_{160}	—	February 14, 2013	Haleakala	Pan-STARRS 1	EOS	1.5 km	MPC · JPL
689076	2013 CY_{161}	—	May 16, 2009	Kitt Peak	Spacewatch	·	1.7 km	MPC · JPL
689077	2013 CA_{162}	—	February 14, 2013	Haleakala	Pan-STARRS 1	·	1.4 km	MPC · JPL
689078	2013 CN_{162}	—	February 14, 2013	Haleakala	Pan-STARRS 1	·	2.1 km	MPC · JPL
689079	2013 CP_{162}	—	February 5, 2013	Kitt Peak	Spacewatch	NYS	770 m	MPC · JPL
689080	2013 CX_{162}	—	February 14, 2013	Kitt Peak	Spacewatch	MAS	610 m	MPC · JPL
689081	2013 CF_{165}	—	August 29, 2006	Kitt Peak	Spacewatch	·	1.2 km	MPC · JPL
689082	2013 CE_{167}	—	September 15, 2006	Kitt Peak	Spacewatch	·	1.5 km	MPC · JPL
689083	2013 CL_{168}	—	February 14, 2013	Haleakala	Pan-STARRS 1	EOS	1.2 km	MPC · JPL
689084	2013 CA_{169}	—	January 19, 2008	Mount Lemmon	Mount Lemmon Survey	·	1.8 km	MPC · JPL
689085	2013 CT_{171}	—	October 24, 2005	Mauna Kea	A. Boattini	·	660 m	MPC · JPL
689086	2013 CW_{173}	—	April 11, 2008	Mount Lemmon	Mount Lemmon Survey	THM	1.7 km	MPC · JPL
689087	2013 CA_{176}	—	April 4, 2008	Mount Lemmon	Mount Lemmon Survey	·	2.0 km	MPC · JPL
689088	2013 CO_{176}	—	January 9, 2013	Mount Lemmon	Mount Lemmon Survey	·	870 m	MPC · JPL
689089	2013 CO_{179}	—	October 25, 2011	Haleakala	Pan-STARRS 1	·	1.9 km	MPC · JPL
689090	2013 CR_{180}	—	February 10, 2013	Haleakala	Pan-STARRS 1	·	600 m	MPC · JPL
689091	2013 CC_{182}	—	February 3, 2013	Haleakala	Pan-STARRS 1	·	2.3 km	MPC · JPL
689092	2013 CQ_{186}	—	February 8, 2013	Haleakala	Pan-STARRS 1	·	610 m	MPC · JPL
689093	2013 CV_{188}	—	February 9, 2013	Haleakala	Pan-STARRS 1	·	1.3 km	MPC · JPL
689094	2013 CY_{189}	—	November 19, 2007	Kitt Peak	Spacewatch	NEM	1.9 km	MPC · JPL
689095	2013 CC_{194}	—	February 9, 2013	Haleakala	Pan-STARRS 1	·	1.6 km	MPC · JPL
689096	2013 CK_{194}	—	February 9, 2013	Haleakala	Pan-STARRS 1	·	1.6 km	MPC · JPL
689097	2013 CE_{195}	—	October 17, 2011	Kitt Peak	Spacewatch	·	1.5 km	MPC · JPL
689098	2013 CQ_{195}	—	February 9, 2013	Haleakala	Pan-STARRS 1	THM	1.7 km	MPC · JPL
689099	2013 CY_{196}	—	March 2, 2009	Kitt Peak	Spacewatch	·	1.6 km	MPC · JPL
689100	2013 CT_{197}	—	February 8, 2013	Haleakala	Pan-STARRS 1	·	2.3 km	MPC · JPL

== 689101–689200 ==
back to top

Designation			Discovery			Properties		Ref
Permanent	Provisional	Named after	Date	Site	Discoverer(s)	Category	Diam.	Ref
689101	2013 CD_{198}	—	December 17, 2007	Mount Lemmon	Mount Lemmon Survey	·	1.7 km	MPC · JPL
689102	2013 CK_{198}	—	January 20, 2013	Mount Lemmon	Mount Lemmon Survey	·	1.7 km	MPC · JPL
689103	2013 CQ_{199}	—	February 9, 2013	Haleakala	Pan-STARRS 1	·	1.5 km	MPC · JPL
689104	2013 CG_{201}	—	February 1, 2013	Kitt Peak	Spacewatch	·	1.6 km	MPC · JPL
689105	2013 CB_{203}	—	February 10, 2008	Kitt Peak	Spacewatch	·	1.4 km	MPC · JPL
689106	2013 CK_{203}	—	June 17, 2010	Mount Lemmon	Mount Lemmon Survey	·	640 m	MPC · JPL
689107	2013 CN_{203}	—	February 28, 2008	Kitt Peak	Spacewatch	·	1.3 km	MPC · JPL
689108	2013 CY_{208}	—	September 20, 2011	Mount Lemmon	Mount Lemmon Survey	·	940 m	MPC · JPL
689109	2013 CE_{209}	—	February 15, 2013	Haleakala	Pan-STARRS 1	H	390 m	MPC · JPL
689110	2013 CA_{210}	—	October 29, 2008	Kitt Peak	Spacewatch	V	470 m	MPC · JPL
689111	2013 CD_{210}	—	September 28, 2011	Kitt Peak	Spacewatch	AGN	1.1 km	MPC · JPL
689112	2013 CQ_{210}	—	December 15, 2007	Kitt Peak	Spacewatch	AGN	1.1 km	MPC · JPL
689113	2013 CA_{211}	—	November 24, 2011	Mount Lemmon	Mount Lemmon Survey	·	1.5 km	MPC · JPL
689114	2013 CM_{212}	—	August 23, 2008	Kitt Peak	Spacewatch	·	480 m	MPC · JPL
689115	2013 CK_{213}	—	September 30, 2006	Mount Lemmon	Mount Lemmon Survey	·	1.5 km	MPC · JPL
689116	2013 CZ_{213}	—	October 10, 2007	Kitt Peak	Spacewatch	·	1.1 km	MPC · JPL
689117	2013 CD_{215}	—	February 8, 2013	Haleakala	Pan-STARRS 1	EOS	1.3 km	MPC · JPL
689118	2013 CD_{217}	—	February 7, 2013	Kitt Peak	Spacewatch	EOS	1.2 km	MPC · JPL
689119	2013 CU_{218}	—	February 8, 2013	Haleakala	Pan-STARRS 1	·	1.7 km	MPC · JPL
689120	2013 CL_{219}	—	February 9, 2013	Haleakala	Pan-STARRS 1	L4	6.0 km	MPC · JPL
689121	2013 CC_{220}	—	November 6, 2010	Mount Lemmon	Mount Lemmon Survey	L4	6.4 km	MPC · JPL
689122	2013 CQ_{220}	—	February 9, 2013	Haleakala	Pan-STARRS 1	MAS	570 m	MPC · JPL
689123	2013 CZ_{221}	—	February 8, 2008	Kitt Peak	Spacewatch	EOS	1.3 km	MPC · JPL
689124	2013 CG_{226}	—	March 5, 2006	Kitt Peak	Spacewatch	·	600 m	MPC · JPL
689125	2013 CA_{227}	—	February 28, 2008	Kitt Peak	Spacewatch	·	1.4 km	MPC · JPL
689126	2013 CF_{227}	—	July 9, 2005	Kitt Peak	Spacewatch	KOR	1.4 km	MPC · JPL
689127	2013 CR_{227}	—	February 15, 2013	Haleakala	Pan-STARRS 1	·	2.1 km	MPC · JPL
689128	2013 CB_{228}	—	February 7, 2013	Kitt Peak	Spacewatch	EOS	1.4 km	MPC · JPL
689129	2013 CF_{228}	—	February 15, 2013	Haleakala	Pan-STARRS 1	·	2.0 km	MPC · JPL
689130	2013 CO_{228}	—	February 5, 2013	Kitt Peak	Spacewatch	·	790 m	MPC · JPL
689131	2013 CS_{228}	—	February 15, 2013	Haleakala	Pan-STARRS 1	KON	1.5 km	MPC · JPL
689132	2013 CR_{229}	—	February 3, 2013	Haleakala	Pan-STARRS 1	EOS	1.4 km	MPC · JPL
689133	2013 CF_{230}	—	July 29, 2014	Haleakala	Pan-STARRS 1	·	910 m	MPC · JPL
689134	2013 CJ_{230}	—	October 10, 2015	Haleakala	Pan-STARRS 1	·	820 m	MPC · JPL
689135	2013 CN_{230}	—	October 10, 2016	Haleakala	Pan-STARRS 1	·	2.0 km	MPC · JPL
689136	2013 CY_{230}	—	February 14, 2013	Haleakala	Pan-STARRS 1	·	1.8 km	MPC · JPL
689137	2013 CD_{234}	—	February 15, 2013	Haleakala	Pan-STARRS 1	·	2.2 km	MPC · JPL
689138	2013 CD_{236}	—	August 21, 2015	Haleakala	Pan-STARRS 1	EOS	1.3 km	MPC · JPL
689139	2013 CL_{236}	—	May 21, 2014	Mount Lemmon	Mount Lemmon Survey	EMA	1.9 km	MPC · JPL
689140	2013 CU_{236}	—	January 8, 2018	Haleakala	Pan-STARRS 1	·	2.0 km	MPC · JPL
689141	2013 CM_{238}	—	February 15, 2013	Haleakala	Pan-STARRS 1	·	1.7 km	MPC · JPL
689142	2013 CD_{239}	—	February 8, 2013	Haleakala	Pan-STARRS 1	·	830 m	MPC · JPL
689143	2013 CJ_{239}	—	February 15, 2013	Haleakala	Pan-STARRS 1	·	880 m	MPC · JPL
689144	2013 CW_{239}	—	February 8, 2013	Haleakala	Pan-STARRS 1	EOS	1.3 km	MPC · JPL
689145	2013 CA_{240}	—	February 3, 2013	Haleakala	Pan-STARRS 1	·	510 m	MPC · JPL
689146	2013 CB_{240}	—	February 8, 2013	Haleakala	Pan-STARRS 1	·	1.4 km	MPC · JPL
689147	2013 CF_{240}	—	February 15, 2013	Haleakala	Pan-STARRS 1	V	460 m	MPC · JPL
689148	2013 CK_{240}	—	February 3, 2013	Haleakala	Pan-STARRS 1	·	1.6 km	MPC · JPL
689149	2013 CP_{240}	—	February 15, 2013	Haleakala	Pan-STARRS 1	·	670 m	MPC · JPL
689150	2013 CQ_{240}	—	February 14, 2013	Haleakala	Pan-STARRS 1	·	1.6 km	MPC · JPL
689151	2013 CB_{241}	—	February 14, 2013	Haleakala	Pan-STARRS 1	·	710 m	MPC · JPL
689152	2013 CD_{241}	—	February 7, 2013	Kitt Peak	Spacewatch	·	1.2 km	MPC · JPL
689153	2013 CW_{241}	—	February 9, 2013	Haleakala	Pan-STARRS 1	·	2.4 km	MPC · JPL
689154	2013 CN_{243}	—	February 5, 2013	Kitt Peak	Spacewatch	·	1.5 km	MPC · JPL
689155	2013 CV_{243}	—	January 20, 2012	Mount Lemmon	Mount Lemmon Survey	L4	5.9 km	MPC · JPL
689156	2013 CJ_{244}	—	February 15, 2013	Haleakala	Pan-STARRS 1	EOS	1.3 km	MPC · JPL
689157	2013 CA_{245}	—	April 5, 2008	Mount Lemmon	Mount Lemmon Survey	·	1.6 km	MPC · JPL
689158	2013 CM_{245}	—	February 14, 2013	Haleakala	Pan-STARRS 1	·	1.8 km	MPC · JPL
689159	2013 CH_{250}	—	February 15, 2013	Haleakala	Pan-STARRS 1	·	1.6 km	MPC · JPL
689160	2013 CD_{251}	—	February 5, 2013	Mount Lemmon	Mount Lemmon Survey	L4	6.5 km	MPC · JPL
689161	2013 CX_{251}	—	February 9, 2013	Haleakala	Pan-STARRS 1	·	700 m	MPC · JPL
689162	2013 CH_{252}	—	February 15, 2013	Haleakala	Pan-STARRS 1	·	1.8 km	MPC · JPL
689163	2013 CM_{252}	—	February 14, 2013	Haleakala	Pan-STARRS 1	·	1.5 km	MPC · JPL
689164	2013 CU_{252}	—	February 3, 2013	Haleakala	Pan-STARRS 1	·	630 m	MPC · JPL
689165	2013 CX_{252}	—	February 14, 2013	Haleakala	Pan-STARRS 1	·	2.4 km	MPC · JPL
689166	2013 CE_{253}	—	February 9, 2013	Haleakala	Pan-STARRS 1	·	1.6 km	MPC · JPL
689167	2013 CH_{254}	—	April 3, 2008	Mount Lemmon	Mount Lemmon Survey	EOS	1.5 km	MPC · JPL
689168	2013 CP_{254}	—	February 15, 2013	Haleakala	Pan-STARRS 1	·	2.0 km	MPC · JPL
689169	2013 CR_{254}	—	February 3, 2013	Haleakala	Pan-STARRS 1	·	1.5 km	MPC · JPL
689170	2013 CW_{254}	—	February 9, 2013	Haleakala	Pan-STARRS 1	·	1.1 km	MPC · JPL
689171	2013 CD_{255}	—	February 5, 2013	Kitt Peak	Spacewatch	·	1.5 km	MPC · JPL
689172	2013 CM_{255}	—	February 9, 2013	Haleakala	Pan-STARRS 1	EOS	1.3 km	MPC · JPL
689173	2013 CT_{256}	—	February 3, 2013	Haleakala	Pan-STARRS 1	EMA	1.9 km	MPC · JPL
689174	2013 CH_{258}	—	February 8, 2013	Haleakala	Pan-STARRS 1	EOS	1.5 km	MPC · JPL
689175	2013 CY_{261}	—	February 14, 2013	Kitt Peak	Spacewatch	·	850 m	MPC · JPL
689176	2013 CA_{262}	—	February 8, 2013	Haleakala	Pan-STARRS 1	·	800 m	MPC · JPL
689177	2013 CO_{265}	—	February 14, 2013	Kitt Peak	Spacewatch	·	2.0 km	MPC · JPL
689178	2013 DH_{2}	—	October 23, 2003	Kitt Peak	Spacewatch	·	960 m	MPC · JPL
689179	2013 DE_{4}	—	February 9, 2013	Haleakala	Pan-STARRS 1	EOS	1.3 km	MPC · JPL
689180	2013 DK_{4}	—	October 24, 2011	Haleakala	Pan-STARRS 1	ANF	1.1 km	MPC · JPL
689181	2013 DM_{5}	—	February 16, 2013	Mount Lemmon	Mount Lemmon Survey	·	1.3 km	MPC · JPL
689182	2013 DV_{5}	—	February 9, 2008	Kitt Peak	Spacewatch	·	1.3 km	MPC · JPL
689183	2013 DL_{8}	—	September 3, 2010	Kitt Peak	Spacewatch	GEF	1.2 km	MPC · JPL
689184	2013 DO_{11}	—	November 19, 2007	Mount Lemmon	Mount Lemmon Survey	·	1.6 km	MPC · JPL
689185	2013 DY_{12}	—	February 17, 2013	Mount Lemmon	Mount Lemmon Survey	·	1.6 km	MPC · JPL
689186	2013 DZ_{12}	—	February 17, 2013	Mount Lemmon	Mount Lemmon Survey	EOS	1.3 km	MPC · JPL
689187	2013 DA_{13}	—	February 9, 2013	Haleakala	Pan-STARRS 1	·	630 m	MPC · JPL
689188	2013 DN_{15}	—	March 16, 2005	Mount Lemmon	Mount Lemmon Survey	H	450 m	MPC · JPL
689189	2013 DZ_{16}	—	February 13, 2002	Apache Point	SDSS Collaboration	·	2.1 km	MPC · JPL
689190	2013 DX_{17}	—	May 23, 2014	Haleakala	Pan-STARRS 1	·	1.2 km	MPC · JPL
689191	2013 DW_{18}	—	May 4, 2014	Mount Lemmon	Mount Lemmon Survey	·	1.6 km	MPC · JPL
689192	2013 DZ_{18}	—	April 25, 2003	Kitt Peak	Spacewatch	·	1.9 km	MPC · JPL
689193	2013 DC_{19}	—	February 17, 2013	Kitt Peak	Spacewatch	·	2.2 km	MPC · JPL
689194	2013 DD_{19}	—	January 16, 2018	Haleakala	Pan-STARRS 1	·	1.2 km	MPC · JPL
689195	2013 DN_{19}	—	February 17, 2013	Mount Lemmon	Mount Lemmon Survey	·	1.5 km	MPC · JPL
689196	2013 DV_{20}	—	February 16, 2013	Mount Lemmon	Mount Lemmon Survey	·	1.4 km	MPC · JPL
689197	2013 DR_{21}	—	March 9, 2006	Mount Lemmon	Mount Lemmon Survey	NYS	590 m	MPC · JPL
689198	2013 DO_{22}	—	February 17, 2013	Kitt Peak	Spacewatch	·	2.3 km	MPC · JPL
689199	2013 DY_{22}	—	February 16, 2013	Mount Lemmon	Mount Lemmon Survey	·	920 m	MPC · JPL
689200	2013 DC_{24}	—	February 17, 2013	Kitt Peak	Spacewatch	EMA	2.0 km	MPC · JPL

== 689201–689300 ==
back to top

Designation			Discovery			Properties		Ref
Permanent	Provisional	Named after	Date	Site	Discoverer(s)	Category	Diam.	Ref
689201	2013 EQ_{3}	—	March 27, 2008	Mount Lemmon	Mount Lemmon Survey	EOS	1.6 km	MPC · JPL
689202	2013 EB_{6}	—	March 3, 2013	Mount Lemmon	Mount Lemmon Survey	·	1.7 km	MPC · JPL
689203	2013 EP_{6}	—	February 7, 2002	Kitt Peak	Deep Ecliptic Survey	TIR	2.2 km	MPC · JPL
689204	2013 ET_{6}	—	April 30, 2006	Kitt Peak	Spacewatch	·	630 m	MPC · JPL
689205	2013 EG_{7}	—	February 15, 2013	Haleakala	Pan-STARRS 1	·	1.9 km	MPC · JPL
689206	2013 EK_{8}	—	March 3, 2013	Mount Lemmon	Mount Lemmon Survey	·	2.3 km	MPC · JPL
689207	2013 EK_{15}	—	October 14, 2001	Socorro	LINEAR	·	790 m	MPC · JPL
689208	2013 EU_{15}	—	May 6, 2006	Kitt Peak	Spacewatch	·	660 m	MPC · JPL
689209	2013 ER_{19}	—	September 19, 2010	Kitt Peak	Spacewatch	·	1.4 km	MPC · JPL
689210 Salvadorjribas	2013 EH_{24}	Salvadorjribas	October 25, 2011	SM Montmagastrell	J. M. Bosch, R. M. Olivera	·	1.2 km	MPC · JPL
689211	2013 EO_{24}	—	March 5, 2013	Kitt Peak	Spacewatch	H	420 m	MPC · JPL
689212	2013 EV_{26}	—	March 7, 2013	Mount Lemmon	Mount Lemmon Survey	·	1.6 km	MPC · JPL
689213	2013 EN_{31}	—	March 7, 2013	Kitt Peak	Spacewatch	·	1.3 km	MPC · JPL
689214	2013 EZ_{36}	—	March 8, 2013	Haleakala	Pan-STARRS 1	·	2.2 km	MPC · JPL
689215	2013 EY_{37}	—	March 8, 2013	Haleakala	Pan-STARRS 1	V	490 m	MPC · JPL
689216	2013 EH_{38}	—	April 20, 2009	Mount Lemmon	Mount Lemmon Survey	·	1.4 km	MPC · JPL
689217	2013 EJ_{39}	—	March 8, 2013	Haleakala	Pan-STARRS 1	·	1.9 km	MPC · JPL
689218	2013 EC_{45}	—	April 15, 2008	Mount Lemmon	Mount Lemmon Survey	·	1.7 km	MPC · JPL
689219	2013 EJ_{47}	—	May 6, 2006	Mount Lemmon	Mount Lemmon Survey	NYS	840 m	MPC · JPL
689220	2013 EX_{48}	—	March 6, 2013	Haleakala	Pan-STARRS 1	·	710 m	MPC · JPL
689221	2013 ER_{49}	—	February 14, 2013	Kitt Peak	Spacewatch	·	1.6 km	MPC · JPL
689222	2013 ER_{50}	—	March 6, 2013	Haleakala	Pan-STARRS 1	HYG	1.7 km	MPC · JPL
689223	2013 EL_{51}	—	December 24, 2006	Kitt Peak	Spacewatch	·	1.6 km	MPC · JPL
689224	2013 EA_{52}	—	March 8, 2013	Haleakala	Pan-STARRS 1	·	1.9 km	MPC · JPL
689225	2013 EH_{53}	—	March 8, 2013	Haleakala	Pan-STARRS 1	·	660 m	MPC · JPL
689226	2013 ER_{54}	—	September 30, 2005	Mount Lemmon	Mount Lemmon Survey	·	1.5 km	MPC · JPL
689227	2013 EU_{54}	—	March 8, 2013	Haleakala	Pan-STARRS 1	·	1.3 km	MPC · JPL
689228	2013 EN_{55}	—	March 8, 2013	Haleakala	Pan-STARRS 1	·	760 m	MPC · JPL
689229	2013 EX_{55}	—	March 8, 2013	Haleakala	Pan-STARRS 1	KOR	1.0 km	MPC · JPL
689230	2013 EK_{56}	—	February 14, 2013	Kitt Peak	Spacewatch	·	1.8 km	MPC · JPL
689231	2013 EL_{56}	—	February 14, 2013	Kitt Peak	Spacewatch	·	1.7 km	MPC · JPL
689232	2013 EN_{56}	—	February 14, 2002	Kitt Peak	Spacewatch	·	1.8 km	MPC · JPL
689233	2013 EO_{56}	—	March 8, 2013	Haleakala	Pan-STARRS 1	·	870 m	MPC · JPL
689234	2013 EY_{56}	—	March 8, 2013	Haleakala	Pan-STARRS 1	EOS	1.4 km	MPC · JPL
689235	2013 EG_{57}	—	March 8, 2013	Haleakala	Pan-STARRS 1	HOF	2.2 km	MPC · JPL
689236	2013 EU_{57}	—	April 6, 2008	Kitt Peak	Spacewatch	·	2.1 km	MPC · JPL
689237	2013 EX_{58}	—	April 3, 2008	Mount Lemmon	Mount Lemmon Survey	·	2.1 km	MPC · JPL
689238	2013 ET_{59}	—	March 8, 2013	Haleakala	Pan-STARRS 1	·	830 m	MPC · JPL
689239	2013 EB_{63}	—	September 30, 2010	Mount Lemmon	Mount Lemmon Survey	·	2.1 km	MPC · JPL
689240	2013 ET_{64}	—	September 14, 2010	Kitt Peak	Spacewatch	·	2.0 km	MPC · JPL
689241	2013 EJ_{65}	—	September 5, 2010	Mount Lemmon	Mount Lemmon Survey	EOS	1.3 km	MPC · JPL
689242	2013 EW_{69}	—	September 21, 2011	Mount Lemmon	Mount Lemmon Survey	·	850 m	MPC · JPL
689243	2013 EA_{70}	—	February 17, 2013	Kitt Peak	Spacewatch	·	1.4 km	MPC · JPL
689244	2013 ET_{70}	—	August 9, 2005	Cerro Tololo	Deep Ecliptic Survey	KOR	1.3 km	MPC · JPL
689245	2013 ES_{71}	—	April 19, 2006	Kitt Peak	Spacewatch	MAS	510 m	MPC · JPL
689246	2013 EY_{71}	—	April 5, 2008	Mount Lemmon	Mount Lemmon Survey	·	1.8 km	MPC · JPL
689247	2013 EU_{73}	—	March 7, 2013	Mount Lemmon	Mount Lemmon Survey	·	1.6 km	MPC · JPL
689248	2013 EX_{73}	—	March 7, 2013	Mount Lemmon	Mount Lemmon Survey	·	800 m	MPC · JPL
689249	2013 EZ_{74}	—	March 7, 2013	Mount Lemmon	Mount Lemmon Survey	·	1.7 km	MPC · JPL
689250	2013 EQ_{75}	—	October 2, 2006	Mount Lemmon	Mount Lemmon Survey	HOF	2.3 km	MPC · JPL
689251	2013 ES_{76}	—	February 19, 2013	Kitt Peak	Spacewatch	EOS	1.4 km	MPC · JPL
689252	2013 EV_{76}	—	March 8, 2013	Haleakala	Pan-STARRS 1	·	1.5 km	MPC · JPL
689253	2013 ED_{77}	—	March 12, 2008	Kitt Peak	Spacewatch	NAE	1.9 km	MPC · JPL
689254	2013 EX_{77}	—	July 17, 2004	Cerro Tololo	Deep Ecliptic Survey	·	2.1 km	MPC · JPL
689255	2013 EQ_{78}	—	March 8, 2013	Haleakala	Pan-STARRS 1	·	1.2 km	MPC · JPL
689256	2013 EH_{81}	—	October 15, 2004	Mount Lemmon	Mount Lemmon Survey	·	710 m	MPC · JPL
689257	2013 EA_{83}	—	March 8, 2013	Haleakala	Pan-STARRS 1	EOS	1.4 km	MPC · JPL
689258	2013 ED_{83}	—	December 15, 2007	Mount Lemmon	Mount Lemmon Survey	·	1.6 km	MPC · JPL
689259	2013 EF_{83}	—	March 8, 2013	Haleakala	Pan-STARRS 1	EOS	1.6 km	MPC · JPL
689260	2013 EE_{84}	—	February 5, 2013	Kitt Peak	Spacewatch	·	740 m	MPC · JPL
689261	2013 EJ_{86}	—	March 8, 2013	Haleakala	Pan-STARRS 1	·	1.7 km	MPC · JPL
689262	2013 EU_{87}	—	March 12, 2013	Palomar	Palomar Transient Factory	·	1.9 km	MPC · JPL
689263	2013 EK_{95}	—	March 8, 2013	Haleakala	Pan-STARRS 1	·	1.4 km	MPC · JPL
689264	2013 EU_{95}	—	May 2, 2008	Mount Lemmon	Mount Lemmon Survey	THM	1.6 km	MPC · JPL
689265	2013 EB_{98}	—	March 8, 2013	Haleakala	Pan-STARRS 1	THM	1.6 km	MPC · JPL
689266	2013 EF_{98}	—	December 9, 2001	Palomar	NEAT	·	670 m	MPC · JPL
689267	2013 EY_{98}	—	March 8, 2013	Haleakala	Pan-STARRS 1	MAS	470 m	MPC · JPL
689268	2013 EU_{99}	—	March 7, 2013	Mount Lemmon	Mount Lemmon Survey	·	2.0 km	MPC · JPL
689269	2013 ED_{100}	—	March 8, 2013	Haleakala	Pan-STARRS 1	·	700 m	MPC · JPL
689270	2013 ER_{105}	—	March 14, 2013	Catalina	CSS	H	410 m	MPC · JPL
689271	2013 ED_{106}	—	October 14, 2010	Mount Lemmon	Mount Lemmon Survey	·	2.2 km	MPC · JPL
689272	2013 ED_{109}	—	October 13, 2006	Kitt Peak	Spacewatch	·	1.7 km	MPC · JPL
689273	2013 EN_{109}	—	March 26, 2001	Kitt Peak	Deep Ecliptic Survey	·	2.0 km	MPC · JPL
689274	2013 EF_{111}	—	March 13, 2013	Palomar	Palomar Transient Factory	·	700 m	MPC · JPL
689275	2013 ET_{112}	—	March 13, 2013	Mount Lemmon	Mount Lemmon Survey	·	1.8 km	MPC · JPL
689276	2013 EO_{114}	—	September 11, 2010	Mount Lemmon	Mount Lemmon Survey	TEL	1.1 km	MPC · JPL
689277	2013 ER_{115}	—	March 12, 2013	Kitt Peak	Spacewatch	·	880 m	MPC · JPL
689278	2013 EC_{117}	—	March 14, 2013	Kitt Peak	Spacewatch	·	1.7 km	MPC · JPL
689279	2013 EN_{117}	—	March 1, 2009	Kitt Peak	Spacewatch	MAR	920 m	MPC · JPL
689280	2013 EU_{117}	—	March 14, 2013	Mount Lemmon	Mount Lemmon Survey	EOS	1.4 km	MPC · JPL
689281	2013 EV_{119}	—	April 4, 2008	Kitt Peak	Spacewatch	·	1.8 km	MPC · JPL
689282	2013 EZ_{121}	—	March 8, 2013	Haleakala	Pan-STARRS 1	·	770 m	MPC · JPL
689283	2013 EZ_{122}	—	March 24, 2006	Mount Lemmon	Mount Lemmon Survey	·	640 m	MPC · JPL
689284	2013 EX_{131}	—	March 13, 2013	Mount Lemmon	Mount Lemmon Survey	·	1.5 km	MPC · JPL
689285	2013 EM_{134}	—	April 9, 2013	Haleakala	Pan-STARRS 1	·	2.4 km	MPC · JPL
689286	2013 EJ_{149}	—	August 18, 2009	Kitt Peak	Spacewatch	·	2.1 km	MPC · JPL
689287	2013 EL_{150}	—	April 9, 2013	Haleakala	Pan-STARRS 1	·	2.1 km	MPC · JPL
689288	2013 EC_{152}	—	September 11, 2007	Mount Lemmon	Mount Lemmon Survey	·	820 m	MPC · JPL
689289	2013 EL_{152}	—	November 5, 2005	Kitt Peak	Spacewatch	THM	1.7 km	MPC · JPL
689290	2013 EZ_{154}	—	March 7, 2013	Kitt Peak	Spacewatch	·	2.3 km	MPC · JPL
689291	2013 EM_{155}	—	October 19, 2006	Mount Lemmon	Mount Lemmon Survey	HOF	2.6 km	MPC · JPL
689292	2013 ED_{156}	—	March 18, 2013	Kitt Peak	Spacewatch	NYS	870 m	MPC · JPL
689293	2013 EK_{156}	—	October 11, 2005	Kitt Peak	Spacewatch	THM	2.0 km	MPC · JPL
689294	2013 EL_{156}	—	March 13, 2013	Kitt Peak	Spacewatch	KOR	1.1 km	MPC · JPL
689295	2013 EB_{157}	—	March 6, 2013	Haleakala	Pan-STARRS 1	V	530 m	MPC · JPL
689296	2013 EP_{157}	—	March 13, 2013	Kitt Peak	Spacewatch	·	700 m	MPC · JPL
689297	2013 EY_{157}	—	November 24, 2011	Haleakala	Pan-STARRS 1	·	1.9 km	MPC · JPL
689298	2013 EJ_{159}	—	November 13, 2017	Haleakala	Pan-STARRS 1	·	1.5 km	MPC · JPL
689299	2013 ER_{159}	—	June 18, 2015	Haleakala	Pan-STARRS 1	·	2.6 km	MPC · JPL
689300	2013 EJ_{160}	—	October 7, 2016	Haleakala	Pan-STARRS 1	·	1.6 km	MPC · JPL

== 689301–689400 ==
back to top

Designation			Discovery			Properties		Ref
Permanent	Provisional	Named after	Date	Site	Discoverer(s)	Category	Diam.	Ref
689301	2013 EW_{160}	—	November 22, 2015	Mount Lemmon	Mount Lemmon Survey	·	660 m	MPC · JPL
689302	2013 EA_{162}	—	December 26, 2006	Kitt Peak	Spacewatch	·	1.7 km	MPC · JPL
689303	2013 EL_{162}	—	March 5, 2013	Mount Lemmon	Mount Lemmon Survey	·	2.1 km	MPC · JPL
689304	2013 EO_{163}	—	March 13, 2013	Haleakala	Pan-STARRS 1	V	550 m	MPC · JPL
689305	2013 EQ_{165}	—	September 27, 2016	Haleakala	Pan-STARRS 1	EOS	1.4 km	MPC · JPL
689306	2013 EF_{166}	—	December 23, 2017	Haleakala	Pan-STARRS 1	·	1.6 km	MPC · JPL
689307	2013 EE_{167}	—	March 13, 2013	Haleakala	Pan-STARRS 1	·	970 m	MPC · JPL
689308	2013 ES_{167}	—	March 6, 2013	Haleakala	Pan-STARRS 1	·	740 m	MPC · JPL
689309	2013 ED_{168}	—	March 13, 2013	Haleakala	Pan-STARRS 1	EOS	1.5 km	MPC · JPL
689310	2013 EM_{168}	—	March 13, 2013	Palomar	Palomar Transient Factory	·	860 m	MPC · JPL
689311	2013 EO_{168}	—	March 8, 2013	Haleakala	Pan-STARRS 1	·	1.7 km	MPC · JPL
689312	2013 EP_{168}	—	March 4, 2013	Haleakala	Pan-STARRS 1	PHO	930 m	MPC · JPL
689313	2013 EV_{168}	—	March 7, 2013	Mount Lemmon	Mount Lemmon Survey	EOS	1.3 km	MPC · JPL
689314	2013 EC_{169}	—	March 13, 2013	Kitt Peak	Spacewatch	·	840 m	MPC · JPL
689315	2013 EJ_{169}	—	March 13, 2013	Kitt Peak	Spacewatch	·	2.0 km	MPC · JPL
689316	2013 EU_{170}	—	March 8, 2013	Haleakala	Pan-STARRS 1	·	1.8 km	MPC · JPL
689317	2013 EE_{171}	—	March 5, 2013	Haleakala	Pan-STARRS 1	·	550 m	MPC · JPL
689318	2013 EU_{171}	—	March 5, 2013	Mount Lemmon	Mount Lemmon Survey	·	610 m	MPC · JPL
689319	2013 EG_{172}	—	March 15, 2013	Mount Lemmon	Mount Lemmon Survey	·	2.1 km	MPC · JPL
689320	2013 EX_{172}	—	March 15, 2013	Kitt Peak	Spacewatch	·	890 m	MPC · JPL
689321	2013 EF_{174}	—	March 5, 2013	Mount Lemmon	Mount Lemmon Survey	·	890 m	MPC · JPL
689322	2013 EU_{176}	—	March 13, 2013	Haleakala	Pan-STARRS 1	·	2.0 km	MPC · JPL
689323	2013 EX_{177}	—	March 12, 2013	Kitt Peak	Spacewatch	·	1.4 km	MPC · JPL
689324	2013 ED_{178}	—	March 15, 2013	Mount Lemmon	Mount Lemmon Survey	·	1.9 km	MPC · JPL
689325	2013 EF_{180}	—	March 2, 2013	Kitt Peak	Spacewatch	·	1.8 km	MPC · JPL
689326	2013 ES_{180}	—	March 13, 2013	Kitt Peak	Spacewatch	·	1.5 km	MPC · JPL
689327	2013 EW_{180}	—	March 14, 2013	Charleston	R. Holmes	·	1.5 km	MPC · JPL
689328	2013 EU_{182}	—	February 6, 2007	Mount Lemmon	Mount Lemmon Survey	·	1.9 km	MPC · JPL
689329	2013 EE_{187}	—	March 8, 2013	Haleakala	Pan-STARRS 1	·	1.7 km	MPC · JPL
689330	2013 FJ_{3}	—	March 30, 2008	Kitt Peak	Spacewatch	·	2.3 km	MPC · JPL
689331	2013 FX_{3}	—	March 5, 2013	Haleakala	Pan-STARRS 1	·	2.2 km	MPC · JPL
689332	2013 FB_{6}	—	March 18, 2013	Palomar	Palomar Transient Factory	·	1.9 km	MPC · JPL
689333	2013 FB_{20}	—	March 19, 2013	Haleakala	Pan-STARRS 1	NYS	830 m	MPC · JPL
689334	2013 FH_{27}	—	September 16, 2010	Mount Lemmon	Mount Lemmon Survey	·	2.4 km	MPC · JPL
689335	2013 FL_{28}	—	March 16, 2013	Cerro Tololo	S. S. Sheppard, C. A. Trujillo	SDO	90 km	MPC · JPL
689336	2013 FW_{29}	—	November 1, 2010	Mount Lemmon	Mount Lemmon Survey	·	2.3 km	MPC · JPL
689337	2013 FM_{30}	—	March 19, 2013	Haleakala	Pan-STARRS 1	·	2.1 km	MPC · JPL
689338	2013 FQ_{30}	—	March 17, 2013	Mount Lemmon	Mount Lemmon Survey	·	2.5 km	MPC · JPL
689339	2013 FZ_{30}	—	March 19, 2013	Haleakala	Pan-STARRS 1	·	1.9 km	MPC · JPL
689340	2013 FF_{32}	—	January 20, 2018	Haleakala	Pan-STARRS 1	·	2.1 km	MPC · JPL
689341	2013 FP_{32}	—	November 6, 2016	Mount Lemmon	Mount Lemmon Survey	·	2.8 km	MPC · JPL
689342	2013 FT_{32}	—	March 19, 2013	Haleakala	Pan-STARRS 1	·	2.2 km	MPC · JPL
689343	2013 FV_{32}	—	March 31, 2013	Mount Lemmon	Mount Lemmon Survey	·	1.7 km	MPC · JPL
689344	2013 FX_{32}	—	January 16, 2013	Mount Lemmon	Mount Lemmon Survey	·	2.4 km	MPC · JPL
689345	2013 FT_{33}	—	March 16, 2013	Kitt Peak	Spacewatch	·	2.4 km	MPC · JPL
689346	2013 FW_{33}	—	March 19, 2013	Haleakala	Pan-STARRS 1	THM	1.8 km	MPC · JPL
689347	2013 FY_{33}	—	March 17, 2013	Mount Lemmon	Mount Lemmon Survey	·	700 m	MPC · JPL
689348	2013 FA_{34}	—	March 17, 2013	Mount Lemmon	Mount Lemmon Survey	·	2.0 km	MPC · JPL
689349	2013 FW_{34}	—	March 17, 2013	Mount Lemmon	Mount Lemmon Survey	·	2.0 km	MPC · JPL
689350	2013 FA_{35}	—	March 18, 2013	Mount Lemmon	Mount Lemmon Survey	·	2.1 km	MPC · JPL
689351	2013 FE_{35}	—	March 19, 2013	Haleakala	Pan-STARRS 1	·	710 m	MPC · JPL
689352	2013 FF_{35}	—	October 1, 2005	Mount Lemmon	Mount Lemmon Survey	·	2.1 km	MPC · JPL
689353	2013 FH_{35}	—	March 16, 2013	Kitt Peak	Spacewatch	·	1.5 km	MPC · JPL
689354	2013 FM_{35}	—	March 31, 2013	Mount Lemmon	Mount Lemmon Survey	VER	2.1 km	MPC · JPL
689355	2013 FN_{35}	—	November 12, 2007	Mount Lemmon	Mount Lemmon Survey	·	660 m	MPC · JPL
689356	2013 FC_{37}	—	March 19, 2013	Haleakala	Pan-STARRS 1	·	1.9 km	MPC · JPL
689357	2013 FY_{37}	—	March 19, 2013	Haleakala	Pan-STARRS 1	·	940 m	MPC · JPL
689358	2013 FB_{38}	—	March 31, 2013	Mount Lemmon	Mount Lemmon Survey	·	830 m	MPC · JPL
689359	2013 FC_{38}	—	February 19, 2007	Mount Lemmon	Mount Lemmon Survey	·	2.1 km	MPC · JPL
689360	2013 FH_{39}	—	March 18, 2013	Mount Lemmon	Mount Lemmon Survey	H	340 m	MPC · JPL
689361	2013 FK_{39}	—	March 19, 2013	Haleakala	Pan-STARRS 1	·	720 m	MPC · JPL
689362	2013 FQ_{39}	—	March 18, 2013	Mount Lemmon	Mount Lemmon Survey	EOS	1.5 km	MPC · JPL
689363	2013 FW_{39}	—	March 19, 2013	Haleakala	Pan-STARRS 1	HYG	1.9 km	MPC · JPL
689364	2013 FR_{41}	—	March 16, 2013	Kitt Peak	Spacewatch	·	1.8 km	MPC · JPL
689365	2013 GY	—	April 1, 2013	Kitt Peak	Spacewatch	·	1.8 km	MPC · JPL
689366	2013 GV_{4}	—	April 1, 2013	Mount Lemmon	Mount Lemmon Survey	·	1.9 km	MPC · JPL
689367	2013 GE_{10}	—	February 18, 2013	Mount Lemmon	Mount Lemmon Survey	·	2.3 km	MPC · JPL
689368	2013 GA_{12}	—	April 2, 2000	Kitt Peak	Spacewatch	·	1.2 km	MPC · JPL
689369	2013 GE_{16}	—	March 8, 2013	Haleakala	Pan-STARRS 1	·	650 m	MPC · JPL
689370	2013 GQ_{18}	—	December 27, 2006	Mount Lemmon	Mount Lemmon Survey	·	1.9 km	MPC · JPL
689371	2013 GJ_{20}	—	March 15, 2013	Kitt Peak	Spacewatch	LIX	2.4 km	MPC · JPL
689372	2013 GA_{21}	—	May 20, 2006	Kitt Peak	Spacewatch	·	760 m	MPC · JPL
689373	2013 GO_{23}	—	March 13, 2013	Haleakala	Pan-STARRS 1	·	2.0 km	MPC · JPL
689374	2013 GA_{25}	—	October 29, 2005	Kitt Peak	Spacewatch	·	1.8 km	MPC · JPL
689375	2013 GN_{25}	—	January 27, 2007	Mount Lemmon	Mount Lemmon Survey	·	1.9 km	MPC · JPL
689376	2013 GJ_{28}	—	March 31, 2013	Mount Lemmon	Mount Lemmon Survey	·	700 m	MPC · JPL
689377	2013 GS_{28}	—	April 6, 2013	Mount Lemmon	Mount Lemmon Survey	·	720 m	MPC · JPL
689378	2013 GB_{29}	—	April 6, 2013	Mount Lemmon	Mount Lemmon Survey	MAS	520 m	MPC · JPL
689379	2013 GL_{29}	—	February 21, 2009	Mount Lemmon	Mount Lemmon Survey	·	920 m	MPC · JPL
689380	2013 GW_{32}	—	April 7, 2013	Mount Lemmon	Mount Lemmon Survey	·	2.2 km	MPC · JPL
689381	2013 GN_{33}	—	February 18, 2013	Mount Lemmon	Mount Lemmon Survey	·	2.2 km	MPC · JPL
689382	2013 GF_{35}	—	April 9, 2013	Haleakala	Pan-STARRS 1	H	340 m	MPC · JPL
689383	2013 GR_{35}	—	April 7, 2013	Mount Lemmon	Mount Lemmon Survey	EOS	1.4 km	MPC · JPL
689384	2013 GD_{37}	—	April 4, 2013	Haleakala	Pan-STARRS 1	·	2.3 km	MPC · JPL
689385	2013 GD_{39}	—	April 5, 2013	Charleston	R. Holmes	·	1.5 km	MPC · JPL
689386	2013 GP_{40}	—	October 19, 2006	Kitt Peak	Spacewatch	WIT	810 m	MPC · JPL
689387	2013 GS_{40}	—	April 7, 2013	Mount Lemmon	Mount Lemmon Survey	·	2.1 km	MPC · JPL
689388	2013 GM_{41}	—	October 26, 2011	Haleakala	Pan-STARRS 1	V	440 m	MPC · JPL
689389	2013 GP_{41}	—	April 8, 2013	Mount Lemmon	Mount Lemmon Survey	·	840 m	MPC · JPL
689390	2013 GX_{41}	—	January 31, 2009	Mount Lemmon	Mount Lemmon Survey	·	1.1 km	MPC · JPL
689391	2013 GC_{42}	—	March 15, 2013	Kitt Peak	Spacewatch	NYS	1.0 km	MPC · JPL
689392	2013 GC_{44}	—	April 8, 2013	Mount Lemmon	Mount Lemmon Survey	TIR	1.8 km	MPC · JPL
689393	2013 GO_{46}	—	March 8, 2013	Haleakala	Pan-STARRS 1	·	1.9 km	MPC · JPL
689394	2013 GX_{47}	—	November 10, 2010	Mount Lemmon	Mount Lemmon Survey	·	2.2 km	MPC · JPL
689395	2013 GR_{49}	—	May 24, 2006	Mount Lemmon	Mount Lemmon Survey	NYS	750 m	MPC · JPL
689396	2013 GS_{51}	—	November 17, 2011	Kitt Peak	Spacewatch	·	1.5 km	MPC · JPL
689397	2013 GV_{51}	—	October 26, 2005	Kitt Peak	Spacewatch	EOS	1.6 km	MPC · JPL
689398	2013 GC_{54}	—	September 17, 2009	Kitt Peak	Spacewatch	·	2.5 km	MPC · JPL
689399	2013 GC_{58}	—	March 15, 2013	Kitt Peak	Spacewatch	·	930 m	MPC · JPL
689400	2013 GP_{58}	—	November 3, 2011	Kitt Peak	Spacewatch	·	890 m	MPC · JPL

== 689401–689500 ==
back to top

Designation			Discovery			Properties		Ref
Permanent	Provisional	Named after	Date	Site	Discoverer(s)	Category	Diam.	Ref
689401	2013 GK_{60}	—	March 7, 2013	Kitt Peak	Spacewatch	·	2.3 km	MPC · JPL
689402	2013 GT_{60}	—	March 13, 2002	Kitt Peak	Spacewatch	THM	1.7 km	MPC · JPL
689403	2013 GU_{60}	—	January 1, 2009	Mount Lemmon	Mount Lemmon Survey	·	720 m	MPC · JPL
689404	2013 GW_{60}	—	December 29, 2011	Mount Lemmon	Mount Lemmon Survey	EOS	1.3 km	MPC · JPL
689405	2013 GH_{61}	—	April 7, 2013	Mount Lemmon	Mount Lemmon Survey	EOS	1.5 km	MPC · JPL
689406	2013 GG_{62}	—	March 14, 2013	Kitt Peak	Spacewatch	EOS	1.6 km	MPC · JPL
689407	2013 GZ_{63}	—	April 9, 2013	Haleakala	Pan-STARRS 1	·	2.1 km	MPC · JPL
689408	2013 GK_{64}	—	February 7, 2007	Kitt Peak	Spacewatch	·	2.0 km	MPC · JPL
689409	2013 GN_{64}	—	November 11, 2006	Kitt Peak	Spacewatch	·	1.9 km	MPC · JPL
689410	2013 GX_{64}	—	April 10, 2013	Mount Lemmon	Mount Lemmon Survey	·	760 m	MPC · JPL
689411	2013 GB_{65}	—	April 7, 2008	Kitt Peak	Spacewatch	EOS	1.5 km	MPC · JPL
689412	2013 GH_{65}	—	April 10, 2013	Mount Lemmon	Mount Lemmon Survey	·	1.3 km	MPC · JPL
689413	2013 GW_{65}	—	April 10, 2013	Haleakala	Pan-STARRS 1	·	1.9 km	MPC · JPL
689414	2013 GK_{66}	—	April 10, 2013	Haleakala	Pan-STARRS 1	H	350 m	MPC · JPL
689415	2013 GE_{67}	—	April 5, 2013	Haleakala	Pan-STARRS 1	·	750 m	MPC · JPL
689416	2013 GS_{67}	—	September 1, 2010	Mount Lemmon	Mount Lemmon Survey	·	1.5 km	MPC · JPL
689417	2013 GW_{73}	—	April 12, 2013	Haleakala	Pan-STARRS 1	·	2.3 km	MPC · JPL
689418	2013 GM_{75}	—	April 10, 2013	Haleakala	Pan-STARRS 1	·	2.1 km	MPC · JPL
689419	2013 GM_{76}	—	January 28, 2007	Kitt Peak	Spacewatch	·	2.8 km	MPC · JPL
689420	2013 GW_{76}	—	March 13, 2013	Kitt Peak	Spacewatch	·	1.0 km	MPC · JPL
689421	2013 GR_{77}	—	April 1, 2013	Mount Lemmon	Mount Lemmon Survey	VER	2.3 km	MPC · JPL
689422	2013 GY_{77}	—	October 9, 2010	Mount Lemmon	Mount Lemmon Survey	·	1.7 km	MPC · JPL
689423	2013 GZ_{77}	—	March 23, 2003	Apache Point	SDSS Collaboration	·	1.5 km	MPC · JPL
689424	2013 GG_{81}	—	April 10, 2013	Haleakala	Pan-STARRS 1	·	730 m	MPC · JPL
689425	2013 GN_{83}	—	October 22, 2005	Kitt Peak	Spacewatch	EOS	1.6 km	MPC · JPL
689426	2013 GO_{87}	—	November 1, 2010	Kitt Peak	Spacewatch	·	2.8 km	MPC · JPL
689427	2013 GR_{88}	—	April 15, 2013	Nogales	M. Schwartz, P. R. Holvorcem	PHO	780 m	MPC · JPL
689428	2013 GS_{90}	—	April 15, 2013	Kitt Peak	Spacewatch	·	970 m	MPC · JPL
689429	2013 GC_{91}	—	April 15, 2013	Haleakala	Pan-STARRS 1	TIR	2.4 km	MPC · JPL
689430	2013 GK_{91}	—	November 25, 2010	Mount Lemmon	Mount Lemmon Survey	EOS	1.9 km	MPC · JPL
689431	2013 GB_{93}	—	April 12, 2013	La Silla	La Silla	·	1.7 km	MPC · JPL
689432	2013 GC_{94}	—	August 15, 2004	Cerro Tololo	Deep Ecliptic Survey	·	2.1 km	MPC · JPL
689433	2013 GY_{94}	—	March 5, 2013	Haleakala	Pan-STARRS 1	·	1.9 km	MPC · JPL
689434	2013 GE_{96}	—	January 27, 2007	Mount Lemmon	Mount Lemmon Survey	THB	2.4 km	MPC · JPL
689435	2013 GG_{99}	—	September 29, 2003	Kitt Peak	Spacewatch	·	890 m	MPC · JPL
689436	2013 GQ_{103}	—	March 5, 2013	Haleakala	Pan-STARRS 1	·	1.7 km	MPC · JPL
689437	2013 GV_{104}	—	March 16, 2013	Catalina	CSS	·	1.0 km	MPC · JPL
689438	2013 GJ_{107}	—	March 16, 2013	Kitt Peak	Spacewatch	·	2.4 km	MPC · JPL
689439	2013 GX_{110}	—	April 11, 2013	Catalina	CSS	·	2.1 km	MPC · JPL
689440	2013 GS_{116}	—	March 12, 2013	Kitt Peak	Spacewatch	NYS	730 m	MPC · JPL
689441	2013 GU_{116}	—	April 4, 2013	Mount Lemmon	Mount Lemmon Survey	·	2.1 km	MPC · JPL
689442	2013 GG_{117}	—	April 5, 2013	Sandlot	G. Hug	V	490 m	MPC · JPL
689443	2013 GJ_{117}	—	April 11, 2008	Kitt Peak	Spacewatch	·	2.0 km	MPC · JPL
689444	2013 GO_{118}	—	January 28, 2007	Kitt Peak	Spacewatch	·	1.9 km	MPC · JPL
689445	2013 GL_{119}	—	March 15, 2013	Kitt Peak	Spacewatch	·	760 m	MPC · JPL
689446	2013 GS_{119}	—	April 7, 2013	Mount Lemmon	Mount Lemmon Survey	EOS	1.4 km	MPC · JPL
689447	2013 GQ_{121}	—	March 26, 2006	Kitt Peak	Spacewatch	·	730 m	MPC · JPL
689448	2013 GC_{122}	—	March 21, 2002	Kitt Peak	Spacewatch	MAS	590 m	MPC · JPL
689449	2013 GK_{122}	—	April 1, 2013	Mount Lemmon	Mount Lemmon Survey	·	730 m	MPC · JPL
689450	2013 GF_{123}	—	April 11, 2013	Mount Lemmon	Mount Lemmon Survey	·	2.3 km	MPC · JPL
689451	2013 GV_{123}	—	November 2, 2010	Mount Lemmon	Mount Lemmon Survey	·	2.7 km	MPC · JPL
689452	2013 GP_{124}	—	April 10, 2013	Haleakala	Pan-STARRS 1	H	400 m	MPC · JPL
689453	2013 GN_{125}	—	April 21, 2002	Kitt Peak	Spacewatch	·	2.6 km	MPC · JPL
689454	2013 GQ_{127}	—	April 13, 2013	Haleakala	Pan-STARRS 1	·	2.7 km	MPC · JPL
689455	2013 GZ_{129}	—	April 10, 2013	Palomar	Palomar Transient Factory	PHO	670 m	MPC · JPL
689456	2013 GN_{134}	—	April 10, 2013	Haleakala	Pan-STARRS 1	·	1.9 km	MPC · JPL
689457	2013 GJ_{135}	—	February 20, 2009	Kitt Peak	Spacewatch	·	930 m	MPC · JPL
689458	2013 GO_{135}	—	April 13, 2013	Haleakala	Pan-STARRS 1	·	1.8 km	MPC · JPL
689459	2013 GF_{139}	—	April 10, 2013	Haleakala	Pan-STARRS 1	NYS	940 m	MPC · JPL
689460	2013 GO_{139}	—	April 8, 2013	Mount Lemmon	Mount Lemmon Survey	·	2.0 km	MPC · JPL
689461	2013 GX_{140}	—	April 13, 2013	Haleakala	Pan-STARRS 1	·	2.5 km	MPC · JPL
689462	2013 GZ_{140}	—	April 13, 2013	Haleakala	Pan-STARRS 1	·	1.8 km	MPC · JPL
689463	2013 GA_{141}	—	April 13, 2013	Haleakala	Pan-STARRS 1	·	2.3 km	MPC · JPL
689464	2013 GG_{141}	—	April 15, 2013	Haleakala	Pan-STARRS 1	HYG	2.1 km	MPC · JPL
689465	2013 GK_{142}	—	October 22, 2016	Mount Lemmon	Mount Lemmon Survey	·	2.7 km	MPC · JPL
689466	2013 GA_{143}	—	September 27, 2016	Haleakala	Pan-STARRS 1	·	2.7 km	MPC · JPL
689467	2013 GN_{143}	—	September 27, 2016	Haleakala	Pan-STARRS 1	·	2.0 km	MPC · JPL
689468	2013 GH_{145}	—	April 13, 2013	Haleakala	Pan-STARRS 1	·	2.1 km	MPC · JPL
689469	2013 GE_{147}	—	November 21, 2017	Haleakala	Pan-STARRS 1	LIX	2.5 km	MPC · JPL
689470	2013 GL_{147}	—	October 1, 2015	Mount Lemmon	Mount Lemmon Survey	EOS	1.3 km	MPC · JPL
689471	2013 GQ_{148}	—	October 25, 2016	Haleakala	Pan-STARRS 1	·	1.6 km	MPC · JPL
689472	2013 GT_{148}	—	February 17, 2007	Kitt Peak	Spacewatch	·	2.3 km	MPC · JPL
689473	2013 GP_{149}	—	October 10, 2015	Haleakala	Pan-STARRS 1	·	2.2 km	MPC · JPL
689474	2013 GG_{151}	—	April 11, 2013	Kitt Peak	Spacewatch	·	2.5 km	MPC · JPL
689475	2013 GL_{151}	—	April 10, 2013	Mount Lemmon	Mount Lemmon Survey	·	2.3 km	MPC · JPL
689476	2013 GS_{151}	—	April 13, 2013	Siding Spring	SSS	·	2.5 km	MPC · JPL
689477	2013 GA_{152}	—	April 10, 2013	Haleakala	Pan-STARRS 1	·	870 m	MPC · JPL
689478	2013 GB_{152}	—	April 13, 2013	Kitt Peak	Spacewatch	·	790 m	MPC · JPL
689479	2013 GD_{152}	—	April 12, 2013	Haleakala	Pan-STARRS 1	·	2.4 km	MPC · JPL
689480	2013 GK_{152}	—	April 15, 2013	Haleakala	Pan-STARRS 1	·	960 m	MPC · JPL
689481	2013 GP_{152}	—	April 11, 2013	Kitt Peak	Spacewatch	·	2.3 km	MPC · JPL
689482	2013 GY_{152}	—	April 13, 2013	Haleakala	Pan-STARRS 1	·	810 m	MPC · JPL
689483	2013 GC_{153}	—	April 15, 2013	Haleakala	Pan-STARRS 1	MAS	620 m	MPC · JPL
689484	2013 GN_{153}	—	April 5, 2013	Palomar	Palomar Transient Factory	·	1 km	MPC · JPL
689485	2013 GM_{155}	—	April 10, 2013	Haleakala	Pan-STARRS 1	·	1.9 km	MPC · JPL
689486	2013 GQ_{155}	—	April 10, 2013	Haleakala	Pan-STARRS 1	EOS	1.5 km	MPC · JPL
689487	2013 GR_{155}	—	April 7, 2013	Mount Lemmon	Mount Lemmon Survey	·	2.0 km	MPC · JPL
689488	2013 GA_{156}	—	April 12, 2013	Cerro Tololo-DECam	DECam	·	2.3 km	MPC · JPL
689489	2013 GM_{156}	—	April 10, 2013	Haleakala	Pan-STARRS 1	·	1.9 km	MPC · JPL
689490	2013 GU_{156}	—	April 10, 2013	Haleakala	Pan-STARRS 1	·	1.7 km	MPC · JPL
689491	2013 GK_{157}	—	April 10, 2013	Haleakala	Pan-STARRS 1	·	690 m	MPC · JPL
689492	2013 GP_{157}	—	April 3, 2013	Palomar	Palomar Transient Factory	·	1.9 km	MPC · JPL
689493	2013 GS_{158}	—	April 7, 2013	Mount Lemmon	Mount Lemmon Survey	·	2.1 km	MPC · JPL
689494	2013 GW_{158}	—	April 8, 2013	Mount Lemmon	Mount Lemmon Survey	·	2.5 km	MPC · JPL
689495	2013 GX_{158}	—	April 15, 2013	Haleakala	Pan-STARRS 1	·	2.2 km	MPC · JPL
689496	2013 GS_{160}	—	April 10, 2013	Haleakala	Pan-STARRS 1	·	2.6 km	MPC · JPL
689497	2013 GW_{160}	—	April 10, 2013	Haleakala	Pan-STARRS 1	MAS	530 m	MPC · JPL
689498	2013 GA_{161}	—	April 1, 2013	Mount Lemmon	Mount Lemmon Survey	TIR	2.0 km	MPC · JPL
689499	2013 GL_{161}	—	April 10, 2013	Haleakala	Pan-STARRS 1	MAS	540 m	MPC · JPL
689500	2013 GZ_{161}	—	September 19, 2010	Kitt Peak	Spacewatch	·	1.9 km	MPC · JPL

== 689501–689600 ==
back to top

Designation			Discovery			Properties		Ref
Permanent	Provisional	Named after	Date	Site	Discoverer(s)	Category	Diam.	Ref
689501	2013 GD_{162}	—	April 8, 2013	Mount Lemmon	Mount Lemmon Survey	THM	1.7 km	MPC · JPL
689502	2013 GE_{162}	—	April 13, 2013	Haleakala	Pan-STARRS 1	·	2.9 km	MPC · JPL
689503	2013 GJ_{162}	—	April 10, 2013	Haleakala	Pan-STARRS 1	EOS	1.3 km	MPC · JPL
689504	2013 GM_{162}	—	April 29, 2008	Kitt Peak	Spacewatch	·	1.4 km	MPC · JPL
689505	2013 GX_{162}	—	April 10, 2013	Haleakala	Pan-STARRS 1	·	2.0 km	MPC · JPL
689506	2013 GX_{163}	—	April 10, 2013	Haleakala	Pan-STARRS 1	·	720 m	MPC · JPL
689507	2013 GH_{168}	—	April 8, 2013	Mount Lemmon	Mount Lemmon Survey	·	2.0 km	MPC · JPL
689508	2013 HC	—	October 17, 2003	Kitt Peak	Spacewatch	H	520 m	MPC · JPL
689509	2013 HP_{1}	—	May 1, 2006	Kitt Peak	Spacewatch	·	740 m	MPC · JPL
689510	2013 HJ_{4}	—	January 27, 2007	Kitt Peak	Spacewatch	EOS	1.7 km	MPC · JPL
689511	2013 HQ_{6}	—	January 10, 2007	Mount Lemmon	Mount Lemmon Survey	·	2.1 km	MPC · JPL
689512	2013 HD_{10}	—	May 29, 2008	Mount Lemmon	Mount Lemmon Survey	H	620 m	MPC · JPL
689513	2013 HY_{11}	—	January 27, 2007	Mount Lemmon	Mount Lemmon Survey	·	2.1 km	MPC · JPL
689514	2013 HB_{13}	—	October 31, 2005	Kitt Peak	Spacewatch	TIR	2.2 km	MPC · JPL
689515	2013 HG_{13}	—	October 28, 2011	Mount Lemmon	Mount Lemmon Survey	·	1.9 km	MPC · JPL
689516	2013 HZ_{16}	—	October 20, 2011	Mount Lemmon	Mount Lemmon Survey	H	450 m	MPC · JPL
689517	2013 HD_{17}	—	April 7, 2013	Kitt Peak	Spacewatch	·	1.1 km	MPC · JPL
689518	2013 HC_{21}	—	April 21, 2013	Palomar	Palomar Transient Factory	·	2.2 km	MPC · JPL
689519	2013 HD_{24}	—	April 30, 2013	Nogales	M. Schwartz, P. R. Holvorcem	·	2.7 km	MPC · JPL
689520	2013 HF_{26}	—	April 8, 2013	Mount Lemmon	Mount Lemmon Survey	·	830 m	MPC · JPL
689521	2013 HK_{28}	—	April 18, 2013	Kitt Peak	Spacewatch	·	2.4 km	MPC · JPL
689522	2013 HT_{30}	—	November 5, 2010	Kitt Peak	Spacewatch	·	2.4 km	MPC · JPL
689523	2013 HG_{31}	—	April 9, 2013	Haleakala	Pan-STARRS 1	·	760 m	MPC · JPL
689524	2013 HQ_{31}	—	April 11, 2007	Kitt Peak	Spacewatch	T_{j} (2.98)	2.4 km	MPC · JPL
689525	2013 HV_{32}	—	October 11, 2010	Mount Lemmon	Mount Lemmon Survey	·	2.1 km	MPC · JPL
689526	2013 HS_{33}	—	November 1, 2005	Kitt Peak	Spacewatch	·	1.6 km	MPC · JPL
689527	2013 HZ_{33}	—	April 16, 2013	Cerro Tololo-DECam	DECam	·	2.1 km	MPC · JPL
689528	2013 HN_{35}	—	November 1, 2010	Kitt Peak	Spacewatch	EOS	1.6 km	MPC · JPL
689529	2013 HP_{37}	—	October 10, 2004	Kitt Peak	Spacewatch	·	2.2 km	MPC · JPL
689530	2013 HM_{39}	—	November 10, 2010	Kitt Peak	Spacewatch	EOS	1.6 km	MPC · JPL
689531	2013 HS_{39}	—	April 9, 2013	Haleakala	Pan-STARRS 1	·	1.6 km	MPC · JPL
689532	2013 HJ_{40}	—	May 28, 2008	Kitt Peak	Spacewatch	·	1.8 km	MPC · JPL
689533	2013 HX_{42}	—	October 30, 2010	Mount Lemmon	Mount Lemmon Survey	·	2.1 km	MPC · JPL
689534	2013 HL_{43}	—	October 31, 2010	Piszkéstető	K. Sárneczky, Z. Kuli	·	1.1 km	MPC · JPL
689535	2013 HE_{44}	—	October 9, 2010	Kitt Peak	Spacewatch	·	2.4 km	MPC · JPL
689536	2013 HC_{45}	—	April 9, 2013	Haleakala	Pan-STARRS 1	·	2.1 km	MPC · JPL
689537	2013 HG_{45}	—	April 9, 2013	Haleakala	Pan-STARRS 1	EOS	1.4 km	MPC · JPL
689538	2013 HD_{46}	—	February 1, 2012	Mount Lemmon	Mount Lemmon Survey	·	2.1 km	MPC · JPL
689539	2013 HE_{46}	—	April 16, 2013	Cerro Tololo-DECam	DECam	·	2.1 km	MPC · JPL
689540	2013 HV_{46}	—	November 28, 2006	Kitt Peak	Spacewatch	·	1.8 km	MPC · JPL
689541	2013 HW_{47}	—	October 19, 2011	Kitt Peak	Spacewatch	·	790 m	MPC · JPL
689542	2013 HQ_{48}	—	October 17, 2010	Mount Lemmon	Mount Lemmon Survey	(7605)	2.7 km	MPC · JPL
689543	2013 HD_{49}	—	April 9, 2013	Haleakala	Pan-STARRS 1	·	2.0 km	MPC · JPL
689544	2013 HL_{49}	—	April 9, 2013	Haleakala	Pan-STARRS 1	·	2.2 km	MPC · JPL
689545	2013 HF_{52}	—	April 16, 2013	Cerro Tololo-DECam	DECam	·	1.2 km	MPC · JPL
689546	2013 HK_{55}	—	September 13, 2005	Kitt Peak	Spacewatch	AGN	930 m	MPC · JPL
689547	2013 HA_{56}	—	April 16, 2013	Cerro Tololo-DECam	DECam	·	760 m	MPC · JPL
689548	2013 HF_{57}	—	April 16, 2013	Cerro Tololo-DECam	DECam	·	2.6 km	MPC · JPL
689549	2013 HG_{60}	—	November 24, 2011	Haleakala	Pan-STARRS 1	·	2.0 km	MPC · JPL
689550	2013 HQ_{61}	—	March 23, 2013	Elena Remote	Oreshko, A.	·	2.3 km	MPC · JPL
689551	2013 HC_{63}	—	March 15, 2007	Mount Lemmon	Mount Lemmon Survey	·	1.9 km	MPC · JPL
689552	2013 HE_{63}	—	April 21, 2013	Mount Lemmon	Mount Lemmon Survey	PHO	650 m	MPC · JPL
689553	2013 HX_{64}	—	April 16, 2013	Cerro Tololo-DECam	DECam	EOS	1.3 km	MPC · JPL
689554	2013 HR_{67}	—	September 24, 2009	Mount Lemmon	Mount Lemmon Survey	URS	2.2 km	MPC · JPL
689555	2013 HO_{68}	—	January 31, 2008	Mount Lemmon	Mount Lemmon Survey	·	1.4 km	MPC · JPL
689556	2013 HP_{68}	—	April 16, 2013	Cerro Tololo-DECam	DECam	AGN	970 m	MPC · JPL
689557	2013 HV_{68}	—	April 9, 2013	Haleakala	Pan-STARRS 1	·	1.9 km	MPC · JPL
689558	2013 HP_{72}	—	April 16, 2013	Cerro Tololo-DECam	DECam	·	1.7 km	MPC · JPL
689559	2013 HR_{75}	—	April 9, 2013	Haleakala	Pan-STARRS 1	·	1.5 km	MPC · JPL
689560	2013 HS_{79}	—	April 16, 2013	Cerro Tololo-DECam	DECam	·	2.0 km	MPC · JPL
689561	2013 HS_{80}	—	April 9, 2013	Haleakala	Pan-STARRS 1	·	650 m	MPC · JPL
689562	2013 HV_{80}	—	April 16, 2013	Cerro Tololo-DECam	DECam	·	2.2 km	MPC · JPL
689563	2013 HB_{82}	—	October 3, 2003	Junk Bond	D. Healy	·	950 m	MPC · JPL
689564	2013 HR_{82}	—	September 30, 2005	Mount Lemmon	Mount Lemmon Survey	KOR	1.1 km	MPC · JPL
689565	2013 HU_{83}	—	April 16, 2013	Cerro Tololo-DECam	DECam	·	1.8 km	MPC · JPL
689566	2013 HQ_{85}	—	October 24, 2005	Kitt Peak	Spacewatch	·	1.7 km	MPC · JPL
689567	2013 HE_{86}	—	April 9, 2013	Haleakala	Pan-STARRS 1	·	1.3 km	MPC · JPL
689568	2013 HS_{86}	—	April 7, 2013	Mount Lemmon	Mount Lemmon Survey	·	2.0 km	MPC · JPL
689569	2013 HM_{89}	—	April 9, 2013	Haleakala	Pan-STARRS 1	·	670 m	MPC · JPL
689570	2013 HW_{89}	—	April 9, 2013	Haleakala	Pan-STARRS 1	·	710 m	MPC · JPL
689571	2013 HE_{92}	—	September 12, 2005	Kitt Peak	Spacewatch	·	1.5 km	MPC · JPL
689572	2013 HH_{92}	—	April 16, 2013	Cerro Tololo-DECam	DECam	·	1.7 km	MPC · JPL
689573	2013 HA_{93}	—	September 5, 2010	Mount Lemmon	Mount Lemmon Survey	·	2.0 km	MPC · JPL
689574	2013 HX_{94}	—	April 2, 2013	Mount Lemmon	Mount Lemmon Survey	·	1.8 km	MPC · JPL
689575	2013 HT_{95}	—	January 27, 2007	Kitt Peak	Spacewatch	THM	1.7 km	MPC · JPL
689576	2013 HS_{96}	—	April 8, 2013	Mount Lemmon	Mount Lemmon Survey	·	1.2 km	MPC · JPL
689577	2013 HW_{98}	—	April 9, 2013	Haleakala	Pan-STARRS 1	MAS	470 m	MPC · JPL
689578	2013 HF_{104}	—	April 6, 2002	Cerro Tololo	Deep Ecliptic Survey	·	1.8 km	MPC · JPL
689579	2013 HG_{105}	—	March 3, 2009	Mount Lemmon	Mount Lemmon Survey	·	780 m	MPC · JPL
689580	2013 HK_{109}	—	April 9, 2013	Haleakala	Pan-STARRS 1	·	2.2 km	MPC · JPL
689581	2013 HD_{112}	—	April 10, 2013	Haleakala	Pan-STARRS 1	·	2.0 km	MPC · JPL
689582	2013 HF_{112}	—	April 10, 2013	Haleakala	Pan-STARRS 1	MAS	490 m	MPC · JPL
689583	2013 HP_{115}	—	October 1, 2010	Kitt Peak	Spacewatch	KOR	1.1 km	MPC · JPL
689584	2013 HL_{118}	—	April 10, 2013	Haleakala	Pan-STARRS 1	·	2.4 km	MPC · JPL
689585	2013 HU_{119}	—	October 19, 2011	Kitt Peak	Spacewatch	·	730 m	MPC · JPL
689586	2013 HR_{120}	—	April 16, 2013	Cerro Tololo-DECam	DECam	·	790 m	MPC · JPL
689587	2013 HU_{120}	—	April 10, 2013	Haleakala	Pan-STARRS 1	HYG	1.8 km	MPC · JPL
689588	2013 HX_{121}	—	April 21, 2013	Mount Lemmon	Mount Lemmon Survey	·	2.0 km	MPC · JPL
689589	2013 HM_{122}	—	January 19, 2012	Mount Lemmon	Mount Lemmon Survey	THM	1.9 km	MPC · JPL
689590	2013 HY_{123}	—	December 11, 2010	Mount Lemmon	Mount Lemmon Survey	·	2.0 km	MPC · JPL
689591	2013 HC_{124}	—	April 17, 2013	Cerro Tololo-DECam	DECam	·	2.1 km	MPC · JPL
689592	2013 HZ_{126}	—	April 17, 2013	Cerro Tololo-DECam	DECam	·	1.9 km	MPC · JPL
689593	2013 HO_{128}	—	December 29, 2011	Mount Lemmon	Mount Lemmon Survey	·	1.5 km	MPC · JPL
689594	2013 HT_{128}	—	April 17, 2013	Cerro Tololo-DECam	DECam	EOS	1.3 km	MPC · JPL
689595	2013 HD_{132}	—	November 12, 2010	Mount Lemmon	Mount Lemmon Survey	·	2.0 km	MPC · JPL
689596	2013 HJ_{132}	—	October 31, 2010	Mount Lemmon	Mount Lemmon Survey	·	1.6 km	MPC · JPL
689597	2013 HK_{132}	—	April 17, 2013	Cerro Tololo-DECam	DECam	·	1.7 km	MPC · JPL
689598	2013 HC_{134}	—	March 16, 2007	Mount Lemmon	Mount Lemmon Survey	HYG	1.7 km	MPC · JPL
689599	2013 HQ_{134}	—	April 9, 2013	Haleakala	Pan-STARRS 1	·	670 m	MPC · JPL
689600	2013 HW_{136}	—	April 17, 2013	Cerro Tololo-DECam	DECam	·	1.8 km	MPC · JPL

== 689601–689700 ==
back to top

Designation			Discovery			Properties		Ref
Permanent	Provisional	Named after	Date	Site	Discoverer(s)	Category	Diam.	Ref
689601	2013 HZ_{136}	—	April 7, 2013	Mount Lemmon	Mount Lemmon Survey	KOR	1.0 km	MPC · JPL
689602	2013 HD_{137}	—	April 7, 2013	Mount Lemmon	Mount Lemmon Survey	·	1.3 km	MPC · JPL
689603	2013 HY_{137}	—	April 9, 2013	Haleakala	Pan-STARRS 1	PHO	810 m	MPC · JPL
689604	2013 HL_{140}	—	January 25, 2009	Kitt Peak	Spacewatch	MAS	580 m	MPC · JPL
689605	2013 HK_{141}	—	October 29, 2005	Catalina	CSS	·	2.2 km	MPC · JPL
689606	2013 HY_{141}	—	September 17, 2010	Mount Lemmon	Mount Lemmon Survey	·	1.5 km	MPC · JPL
689607	2013 HS_{142}	—	February 1, 2009	Mount Lemmon	Mount Lemmon Survey	·	730 m	MPC · JPL
689608	2013 HU_{142}	—	April 10, 2013	Haleakala	Pan-STARRS 1	·	2.5 km	MPC · JPL
689609	2013 HO_{145}	—	September 18, 2009	Mount Lemmon	Mount Lemmon Survey	·	2.0 km	MPC · JPL
689610	2013 HA_{146}	—	September 2, 2010	Mount Lemmon	Mount Lemmon Survey	·	1.2 km	MPC · JPL
689611	2013 HW_{147}	—	April 16, 2013	Cerro Tololo-DECam	DECam	·	2.2 km	MPC · JPL
689612	2013 HZ_{147}	—	April 11, 2013	ESA OGS	ESA OGS	EOS	1.2 km	MPC · JPL
689613	2013 HX_{148}	—	April 17, 2013	Cerro Tololo-DECam	DECam	·	1.3 km	MPC · JPL
689614	2013 HK_{149}	—	May 12, 2013	Mount Lemmon	Mount Lemmon Survey	·	2.4 km	MPC · JPL
689615	2013 HL_{153}	—	October 10, 2004	Kitt Peak	Spacewatch	·	2.5 km	MPC · JPL
689616	2013 HG_{154}	—	September 17, 2010	Mount Lemmon	Mount Lemmon Survey	·	2.4 km	MPC · JPL
689617	2013 HL_{157}	—	January 2, 2012	Mount Lemmon	Mount Lemmon Survey	LIX	3.4 km	MPC · JPL
689618	2013 HX_{158}	—	April 16, 2013	Kitt Peak	Spacewatch	·	2.5 km	MPC · JPL
689619	2013 HB_{160}	—	March 10, 2005	Mount Lemmon	Mount Lemmon Survey	MAS	660 m	MPC · JPL
689620	2013 HF_{160}	—	November 3, 2015	Mount Lemmon	Mount Lemmon Survey	·	2.2 km	MPC · JPL
689621	2013 HS_{160}	—	April 30, 2013	Mount Lemmon	Mount Lemmon Survey	·	2.1 km	MPC · JPL
689622	2013 HV_{161}	—	April 16, 2013	Haleakala	Pan-STARRS 1	MAS	630 m	MPC · JPL
689623	2013 HX_{161}	—	April 17, 2013	Haleakala	Pan-STARRS 1	·	2.4 km	MPC · JPL
689624	2013 HE_{162}	—	April 19, 2013	Haleakala	Pan-STARRS 1	URS	2.8 km	MPC · JPL
689625	2013 HF_{162}	—	April 18, 2013	Kitt Peak	Spacewatch	·	1.9 km	MPC · JPL
689626	2013 HL_{162}	—	April 29, 2013	Mount Lemmon	Mount Lemmon Survey	·	1.8 km	MPC · JPL
689627	2013 HR_{162}	—	April 17, 2013	Haleakala	Pan-STARRS 1	·	2.4 km	MPC · JPL
689628	2013 HT_{162}	—	April 19, 2013	Mount Lemmon	Mount Lemmon Survey	·	1.2 km	MPC · JPL
689629	2013 HV_{162}	—	April 16, 2013	Haleakala	Pan-STARRS 1	EOS	1.8 km	MPC · JPL
689630	2013 HY_{162}	—	April 18, 2013	Mount Lemmon	Mount Lemmon Survey	·	2.2 km	MPC · JPL
689631	2013 HB_{163}	—	April 23, 2013	Mount Lemmon	Mount Lemmon Survey	·	2.5 km	MPC · JPL
689632	2013 HC_{163}	—	April 19, 2013	Haleakala	Pan-STARRS 1	·	2.0 km	MPC · JPL
689633	2013 HD_{163}	—	April 17, 2013	Haleakala	Pan-STARRS 1	·	2.2 km	MPC · JPL
689634	2013 HF_{163}	—	April 16, 2013	Haleakala	Pan-STARRS 1	·	2.2 km	MPC · JPL
689635	2013 HH_{163}	—	April 20, 2013	Mount Lemmon	Mount Lemmon Survey	·	3.5 km	MPC · JPL
689636	2013 HJ_{163}	—	April 16, 2013	Haleakala	Pan-STARRS 1	·	2.1 km	MPC · JPL
689637	2013 HN_{163}	—	April 19, 2013	Haleakala	Pan-STARRS 1	·	2.2 km	MPC · JPL
689638	2013 HS_{164}	—	April 16, 2013	Haleakala	Pan-STARRS 1	TIR	2.0 km	MPC · JPL
689639	2013 HU_{164}	—	April 16, 2013	Haleakala	Pan-STARRS 1	·	2.9 km	MPC · JPL
689640	2013 HG_{165}	—	April 22, 2013	Mount Lemmon	Mount Lemmon Survey	V	430 m	MPC · JPL
689641	2013 HX_{165}	—	April 16, 2013	Haleakala	Pan-STARRS 1	·	1.0 km	MPC · JPL
689642	2013 HN_{166}	—	December 29, 2011	Mount Lemmon	Mount Lemmon Survey	TIR	2.2 km	MPC · JPL
689643	2013 JF	—	May 1, 2013	Palomar	Palomar Transient Factory	·	2.5 km	MPC · JPL
689644	2013 JL	—	April 10, 2013	Catalina	CSS	·	2.3 km	MPC · JPL
689645	2013 JS	—	January 3, 2009	Kitt Peak	Spacewatch	NYS	770 m	MPC · JPL
689646	2013 JQ_{2}	—	April 7, 2013	Mount Lemmon	Mount Lemmon Survey	EUP	3.3 km	MPC · JPL
689647	2013 JT_{4}	—	March 4, 2005	Mount Lemmon	Mount Lemmon Survey	MAS	630 m	MPC · JPL
689648	2013 JY_{7}	—	April 15, 2013	Haleakala	Pan-STARRS 1	·	2.4 km	MPC · JPL
689649	2013 JD_{8}	—	May 2, 2013	Mount Lemmon	Mount Lemmon Survey	EUP	2.8 km	MPC · JPL
689650	2013 JN_{9}	—	September 16, 2009	Mount Lemmon	Mount Lemmon Survey	·	2.2 km	MPC · JPL
689651	2013 JK_{10}	—	May 7, 2013	Mount Lemmon	Mount Lemmon Survey	·	1.9 km	MPC · JPL
689652	2013 JR_{11}	—	October 29, 2010	Mount Lemmon	Mount Lemmon Survey	·	3.1 km	MPC · JPL
689653	2013 JB_{13}	—	April 15, 2013	Haleakala	Pan-STARRS 1	·	2.4 km	MPC · JPL
689654	2013 JA_{16}	—	May 8, 2013	Haleakala	Pan-STARRS 1	TEL	1.1 km	MPC · JPL
689655	2013 JO_{17}	—	May 9, 2013	Mount Lemmon	Mount Lemmon Survey	H	390 m	MPC · JPL
689656	2013 JY_{18}	—	November 27, 2010	Mount Lemmon	Mount Lemmon Survey	·	2.4 km	MPC · JPL
689657	2013 JD_{19}	—	April 15, 2013	Haleakala	Pan-STARRS 1	·	1.6 km	MPC · JPL
689658	2013 JO_{20}	—	April 15, 2002	Anderson Mesa	LONEOS	·	2.3 km	MPC · JPL
689659	2013 JA_{21}	—	January 27, 2012	Mount Lemmon	Mount Lemmon Survey	·	2.0 km	MPC · JPL
689660	2013 JA_{22}	—	March 12, 2007	Mount Lemmon	Mount Lemmon Survey	·	2.0 km	MPC · JPL
689661	2013 JZ_{24}	—	September 17, 2009	Kitt Peak	Spacewatch	·	2.5 km	MPC · JPL
689662	2013 JU_{25}	—	September 21, 2009	Kitt Peak	Spacewatch	·	2.5 km	MPC · JPL
689663	2013 JW_{26}	—	April 1, 2003	Apache Point	SDSS Collaboration	·	1.9 km	MPC · JPL
689664	2013 JQ_{30}	—	May 11, 2013	Mount Lemmon	Mount Lemmon Survey	·	1.6 km	MPC · JPL
689665	2013 JF_{32}	—	May 12, 2013	Mount Lemmon	Mount Lemmon Survey	VER	2.1 km	MPC · JPL
689666	2013 JA_{33}	—	March 14, 2013	Palomar	Palomar Transient Factory	·	2.3 km	MPC · JPL
689667	2013 JM_{35}	—	May 12, 2013	Mount Lemmon	Mount Lemmon Survey	·	2.0 km	MPC · JPL
689668	2013 JU_{38}	—	April 16, 2013	Haleakala	Pan-STARRS 1	·	2.6 km	MPC · JPL
689669	2013 JL_{39}	—	October 15, 2004	Mount Lemmon	Mount Lemmon Survey	·	2.4 km	MPC · JPL
689670	2013 JO_{39}	—	March 11, 2005	Kitt Peak	Deep Ecliptic Survey	NYS	880 m	MPC · JPL
689671	2013 JO_{40}	—	May 12, 2013	Haleakala	Pan-STARRS 1	·	2.6 km	MPC · JPL
689672	2013 JK_{41}	—	August 20, 2009	Kitt Peak	Spacewatch	·	1.9 km	MPC · JPL
689673	2013 JN_{42}	—	March 19, 2009	Mount Lemmon	Mount Lemmon Survey	NYS	840 m	MPC · JPL
689674	2013 JW_{42}	—	February 19, 2009	Kitt Peak	Spacewatch	·	990 m	MPC · JPL
689675	2013 JA_{43}	—	April 22, 2013	Mount Lemmon	Mount Lemmon Survey	·	2.7 km	MPC · JPL
689676	2013 JD_{43}	—	February 28, 2009	Kitt Peak	Spacewatch	NYS	960 m	MPC · JPL
689677	2013 JF_{44}	—	February 27, 2009	Mount Lemmon	Mount Lemmon Survey	·	850 m	MPC · JPL
689678	2013 JP_{45}	—	December 15, 2006	Kitt Peak	Spacewatch	AGN	1.1 km	MPC · JPL
689679	2013 JA_{46}	—	March 29, 2008	Kitt Peak	Spacewatch	·	2.0 km	MPC · JPL
689680	2013 JU_{47}	—	April 19, 2013	Haleakala	Pan-STARRS 1	·	2.5 km	MPC · JPL
689681	2013 JB_{53}	—	April 12, 2013	Haleakala	Pan-STARRS 1	·	2.4 km	MPC · JPL
689682	2013 JJ_{54}	—	May 8, 2013	Haleakala	Pan-STARRS 1	·	2.8 km	MPC · JPL
689683	2013 JJ_{55}	—	April 16, 2013	Haleakala	Pan-STARRS 1	·	2.7 km	MPC · JPL
689684	2013 JA_{56}	—	May 8, 2013	Haleakala	Pan-STARRS 1	·	2.0 km	MPC · JPL
689685	2013 JD_{56}	—	April 19, 2013	Haleakala	Pan-STARRS 1	·	2.5 km	MPC · JPL
689686	2013 JE_{57}	—	April 15, 2013	Haleakala	Pan-STARRS 1	LIX	2.8 km	MPC · JPL
689687	2013 JL_{57}	—	May 8, 2013	Haleakala	Pan-STARRS 1	TIR	2.1 km	MPC · JPL
689688	2013 JM_{57}	—	April 15, 2013	Haleakala	Pan-STARRS 1	·	2.0 km	MPC · JPL
689689	2013 JH_{59}	—	April 13, 2013	Haleakala	Pan-STARRS 1	NYS	850 m	MPC · JPL
689690	2013 JJ_{59}	—	April 11, 2013	ESA OGS	ESA OGS	·	1.2 km	MPC · JPL
689691	2013 JZ_{59}	—	May 9, 2013	Haleakala	Pan-STARRS 1	·	2.4 km	MPC · JPL
689692	2013 JO_{63}	—	May 12, 2013	Kitt Peak	Spacewatch	H	500 m	MPC · JPL
689693	2013 JA_{66}	—	February 3, 2012	Haleakala	Pan-STARRS 1	·	2.3 km	MPC · JPL
689694	2013 JQ_{66}	—	March 21, 2009	Mount Lemmon	Mount Lemmon Survey	·	870 m	MPC · JPL
689695	2013 JB_{68}	—	August 22, 2014	Haleakala	Pan-STARRS 1	·	2.5 km	MPC · JPL
689696	2013 JL_{68}	—	May 15, 2013	Haleakala	Pan-STARRS 1	·	2.9 km	MPC · JPL
689697	2013 JQ_{68}	—	August 27, 2014	Haleakala	Pan-STARRS 1	PHO	740 m	MPC · JPL
689698	2013 JS_{68}	—	May 15, 2013	Haleakala	Pan-STARRS 1	·	960 m	MPC · JPL
689699	2013 JX_{68}	—	August 16, 2014	Haleakala	Pan-STARRS 1	·	2.3 km	MPC · JPL
689700	2013 JL_{69}	—	May 9, 2013	Haleakala	Pan-STARRS 1	·	2.1 km	MPC · JPL

== 689701–689800 ==
back to top

Designation			Discovery			Properties		Ref
Permanent	Provisional	Named after	Date	Site	Discoverer(s)	Category	Diam.	Ref
689701	2013 JX_{69}	—	March 10, 2007	Kitt Peak	Spacewatch	·	1.9 km	MPC · JPL
689702	2013 JB_{71}	—	June 24, 2014	Haleakala	Pan-STARRS 1	·	2.1 km	MPC · JPL
689703	2013 JR_{71}	—	May 2, 2013	Kitt Peak	Spacewatch	NYS	820 m	MPC · JPL
689704	2013 JX_{71}	—	May 3, 2013	Mount Lemmon	Mount Lemmon Survey	MAS	630 m	MPC · JPL
689705	2013 JS_{72}	—	May 15, 2013	Haleakala	Pan-STARRS 1	·	2.3 km	MPC · JPL
689706	2013 JC_{73}	—	October 9, 2015	Haleakala	Pan-STARRS 1	VER	1.9 km	MPC · JPL
689707	2013 JN_{73}	—	September 10, 2015	Haleakala	Pan-STARRS 1	·	2.2 km	MPC · JPL
689708	2013 JK_{74}	—	May 8, 2013	Haleakala	Pan-STARRS 1	·	860 m	MPC · JPL
689709	2013 JS_{74}	—	May 8, 2013	Haleakala	Pan-STARRS 1	·	1.6 km	MPC · JPL
689710	2013 JU_{74}	—	May 8, 2013	Haleakala	Pan-STARRS 1	·	820 m	MPC · JPL
689711	2013 JX_{74}	—	May 12, 2013	Haleakala	Pan-STARRS 1	·	2.1 km	MPC · JPL
689712	2013 JZ_{74}	—	May 12, 2013	Haleakala	Pan-STARRS 1	·	1.0 km	MPC · JPL
689713	2013 JJ_{75}	—	May 5, 2013	Haleakala	Pan-STARRS 1	·	2.2 km	MPC · JPL
689714	2013 JM_{76}	—	May 15, 2013	Haleakala	Pan-STARRS 1	VER	2.1 km	MPC · JPL
689715	2013 JO_{76}	—	May 8, 2013	Haleakala	Pan-STARRS 1	·	1.8 km	MPC · JPL
689716	2013 JP_{76}	—	May 12, 2013	Haleakala	Pan-STARRS 1	·	2.1 km	MPC · JPL
689717	2013 JU_{76}	—	May 5, 2013	Haleakala	Pan-STARRS 1	·	2.0 km	MPC · JPL
689718	2013 JT_{77}	—	May 12, 2013	Mount Lemmon	Mount Lemmon Survey	·	2.4 km	MPC · JPL
689719	2013 JU_{77}	—	May 12, 2013	Mount Lemmon	Mount Lemmon Survey	·	2.6 km	MPC · JPL
689720	2013 JV_{77}	—	March 20, 2007	Mount Lemmon	Mount Lemmon Survey	·	2.4 km	MPC · JPL
689721	2013 JA_{79}	—	May 7, 2013	Mount Lemmon	Mount Lemmon Survey	EOS	1.4 km	MPC · JPL
689722	2013 JT_{79}	—	May 7, 2013	Mount Lemmon	Mount Lemmon Survey	MAS	470 m	MPC · JPL
689723	2013 JC_{80}	—	May 8, 2013	Haleakala	Pan-STARRS 1	VER	2.0 km	MPC · JPL
689724	2013 JD_{80}	—	May 9, 2013	Haleakala	Pan-STARRS 1	·	2.0 km	MPC · JPL
689725	2013 JQ_{82}	—	February 21, 2007	Mount Lemmon	Mount Lemmon Survey	·	1.7 km	MPC · JPL
689726	2013 JD_{84}	—	May 8, 2013	Haleakala	Pan-STARRS 1	·	2.2 km	MPC · JPL
689727	2013 JK_{84}	—	May 1, 2013	Mount Lemmon	Mount Lemmon Survey	·	2.3 km	MPC · JPL
689728	2013 KN	—	May 8, 2013	Haleakala	Pan-STARRS 1	VER	2.1 km	MPC · JPL
689729	2013 KL_{3}	—	February 1, 2012	Mount Lemmon	Mount Lemmon Survey	HYG	2.1 km	MPC · JPL
689730	2013 KU_{3}	—	May 16, 2013	Haleakala	Pan-STARRS 1	·	3.0 km	MPC · JPL
689731	2013 KZ_{5}	—	April 13, 2013	Haleakala	Pan-STARRS 1	·	1.0 km	MPC · JPL
689732	2013 KY_{7}	—	May 6, 2013	Siding Spring	SSS	LIX	3.2 km	MPC · JPL
689733	2013 KX_{8}	—	May 8, 2013	Haleakala	Pan-STARRS 1	NYS	920 m	MPC · JPL
689734	2013 KF_{9}	—	February 23, 2012	Mount Lemmon	Mount Lemmon Survey	EUP	2.4 km	MPC · JPL
689735	2013 KJ_{10}	—	May 16, 2013	Mount Lemmon	Mount Lemmon Survey	·	900 m	MPC · JPL
689736	2013 KX_{10}	—	January 29, 2012	Mount Lemmon	Mount Lemmon Survey	BRA	1.3 km	MPC · JPL
689737	2013 KZ_{10}	—	April 11, 2002	Palomar	NEAT	·	2.2 km	MPC · JPL
689738	2013 KT_{11}	—	May 16, 2013	Mount Lemmon	Mount Lemmon Survey	·	3.0 km	MPC · JPL
689739	2013 KH_{15}	—	May 16, 2013	Haleakala	Pan-STARRS 1	·	2.4 km	MPC · JPL
689740	2013 KT_{15}	—	May 30, 2013	Mount Lemmon	Mount Lemmon Survey	·	2.5 km	MPC · JPL
689741	2013 KZ_{15}	—	January 16, 2005	Mauna Kea	Veillet, C.	MAS	670 m	MPC · JPL
689742	2013 KF_{17}	—	January 28, 2011	Mount Lemmon	Mount Lemmon Survey	TIR	2.6 km	MPC · JPL
689743	2013 KL_{17}	—	May 21, 2013	Mount Lemmon	Mount Lemmon Survey	LUT	2.5 km	MPC · JPL
689744	2013 KY_{20}	—	May 16, 2013	Haleakala	Pan-STARRS 1	·	900 m	MPC · JPL
689745	2013 KE_{21}	—	May 16, 2013	Mount Lemmon	Mount Lemmon Survey	·	2.5 km	MPC · JPL
689746	2013 KF_{21}	—	May 18, 2013	Mount Lemmon	Mount Lemmon Survey	·	2.4 km	MPC · JPL
689747	2013 KH_{21}	—	April 20, 2009	Catalina	CSS	·	1.1 km	MPC · JPL
689748	2013 LW_{2}	—	April 19, 2007	Kitt Peak	Spacewatch	·	2.4 km	MPC · JPL
689749	2013 LZ_{2}	—	May 16, 2013	Haleakala	Pan-STARRS 1	·	2.6 km	MPC · JPL
689750	2013 LD_{3}	—	March 20, 2007	Kitt Peak	Spacewatch	·	2.6 km	MPC · JPL
689751	2013 LG_{3}	—	June 1, 2013	Kitt Peak	Spacewatch	·	2.3 km	MPC · JPL
689752	2013 LD_{4}	—	May 8, 2013	Haleakala	Pan-STARRS 1	·	880 m	MPC · JPL
689753	2013 LE_{5}	—	November 8, 2007	Mount Lemmon	Mount Lemmon Survey	·	700 m	MPC · JPL
689754	2013 LY_{5}	—	June 2, 2013	Kitt Peak	Spacewatch	·	2.5 km	MPC · JPL
689755	2013 LF_{6}	—	April 15, 2013	Haleakala	Pan-STARRS 1	TIR	2.3 km	MPC · JPL
689756	2013 LV_{7}	—	May 30, 2013	Mount Lemmon	Mount Lemmon Survey	T_{j} (2.99)	4.2 km	MPC · JPL
689757	2013 LT_{9}	—	June 4, 2013	Mount Lemmon	Mount Lemmon Survey	(43176)	2.8 km	MPC · JPL
689758	2013 LX_{9}	—	June 4, 2013	Mount Lemmon	Mount Lemmon Survey	VER	2.0 km	MPC · JPL
689759	2013 LP_{10}	—	November 1, 2010	Mount Lemmon	Mount Lemmon Survey	TIR	2.5 km	MPC · JPL
689760	2013 LD_{11}	—	February 23, 2012	Mount Lemmon	Mount Lemmon Survey	·	1.4 km	MPC · JPL
689761	2013 LO_{13}	—	March 15, 2012	Mount Lemmon	Mount Lemmon Survey	·	2.3 km	MPC · JPL
689762	2013 LT_{13}	—	June 5, 2013	Mount Lemmon	Mount Lemmon Survey	·	950 m	MPC · JPL
689763	2013 LF_{14}	—	June 5, 2013	Mount Lemmon	Mount Lemmon Survey	·	2.4 km	MPC · JPL
689764	2013 LM_{15}	—	January 18, 2012	Kitt Peak	Spacewatch	·	2.5 km	MPC · JPL
689765	2013 LX_{18}	—	May 12, 2013	Mount Lemmon	Mount Lemmon Survey	·	520 m	MPC · JPL
689766	2013 LG_{19}	—	May 16, 2013	Mount Lemmon	Mount Lemmon Survey	·	800 m	MPC · JPL
689767	2013 LM_{19}	—	May 16, 2013	Haleakala	Pan-STARRS 1	·	2.7 km	MPC · JPL
689768	2013 LB_{22}	—	August 12, 2008	La Sagra	OAM	THB	3.0 km	MPC · JPL
689769	2013 LL_{22}	—	August 25, 2008	Črni Vrh	Matičič, S.	·	2.0 km	MPC · JPL
689770	2013 LU_{25}	—	May 5, 2013	Piszkés-tető	K. Sárneczky, S. Kürti	TIR	2.1 km	MPC · JPL
689771	2013 LK_{27}	—	April 19, 2013	Haleakala	Pan-STARRS 1	·	1.2 km	MPC · JPL
689772	2013 LF_{31}	—	June 15, 2013	Mount Lemmon	Mount Lemmon Survey	T_{j} (2.99)	3.7 km	MPC · JPL
689773	2013 LR_{37}	—	August 3, 2014	Haleakala	Pan-STARRS 1	·	2.3 km	MPC · JPL
689774	2013 LP_{38}	—	June 7, 2013	Haleakala	Pan-STARRS 1	·	2.8 km	MPC · JPL
689775	2013 LG_{40}	—	June 12, 2013	Haleakala	Pan-STARRS 1	·	2.9 km	MPC · JPL
689776	2013 LL_{40}	—	September 25, 2014	Mount Lemmon	Mount Lemmon Survey	V	480 m	MPC · JPL
689777	2013 LV_{41}	—	June 7, 2013	Haleakala	Pan-STARRS 1	·	2.8 km	MPC · JPL
689778	2013 LJ_{42}	—	June 1, 2013	Haleakala	Pan-STARRS 1	·	2.5 km	MPC · JPL
689779	2013 LL_{42}	—	June 5, 2013	Mount Lemmon	Mount Lemmon Survey	·	2.2 km	MPC · JPL
689780	2013 LM_{42}	—	June 7, 2013	Haleakala	Pan-STARRS 1	·	2.3 km	MPC · JPL
689781	2013 LO_{42}	—	June 4, 2013	Mount Lemmon	Mount Lemmon Survey	VER	2.1 km	MPC · JPL
689782	2013 LQ_{44}	—	June 7, 2013	Haleakala	Pan-STARRS 1	·	2.3 km	MPC · JPL
689783	2013 LS_{44}	—	June 4, 2013	Mount Lemmon	Mount Lemmon Survey	URS	2.9 km	MPC · JPL
689784	2013 LZ_{44}	—	June 12, 2013	Haleakala	Pan-STARRS 1	·	890 m	MPC · JPL
689785	2013 ME_{5}	—	June 19, 2013	Mount Lemmon	Mount Lemmon Survey	·	670 m	MPC · JPL
689786	2013 MV_{13}	—	November 27, 2010	Mount Lemmon	Mount Lemmon Survey	·	980 m	MPC · JPL
689787	2013 MC_{14}	—	June 18, 2013	Haleakala	Pan-STARRS 1	·	3.0 km	MPC · JPL
689788	2013 MU_{17}	—	June 20, 2013	Mount Lemmon	Mount Lemmon Survey	PHO	750 m	MPC · JPL
689789	2013 MV_{17}	—	October 2, 2008	Mount Lemmon	Mount Lemmon Survey	EOS	1.5 km	MPC · JPL
689790	2013 MR_{18}	—	June 16, 2013	Haleakala	Pan-STARRS 1	plutino	130 km	MPC · JPL
689791	2013 MP_{19}	—	June 18, 2013	Haleakala	Pan-STARRS 1	·	590 m	MPC · JPL
689792	2013 MA_{20}	—	June 18, 2013	Haleakala	Pan-STARRS 1	·	2.6 km	MPC · JPL
689793	2013 MX_{20}	—	June 20, 2013	Haleakala	Pan-STARRS 1	·	880 m	MPC · JPL
689794	2013 MU_{21}	—	June 20, 2013	Haleakala	Pan-STARRS 1	·	1.1 km	MPC · JPL
689795	2013 MZ_{22}	—	June 17, 2013	Haleakala	Pan-STARRS 1	·	1.2 km	MPC · JPL
689796	2013 NQ_{4}	—	July 1, 2013	Haleakala	Pan-STARRS 1	·	3.0 km	MPC · JPL
689797	2013 NT_{9}	—	July 2, 2013	Haleakala	Pan-STARRS 1	·	1.3 km	MPC · JPL
689798	2013 NU_{20}	—	May 20, 2005	Mount Lemmon	Mount Lemmon Survey	·	960 m	MPC · JPL
689799	2013 NO_{26}	—	October 9, 2008	Mount Lemmon	Mount Lemmon Survey	·	2.4 km	MPC · JPL
689800	2013 NV_{28}	—	July 2, 2013	Haleakala	Pan-STARRS 1	·	3.4 km	MPC · JPL

== 689801–689900 ==
back to top

Designation			Discovery			Properties		Ref
Permanent	Provisional	Named after	Date	Site	Discoverer(s)	Category	Diam.	Ref
689801	2013 NN_{30}	—	September 29, 2008	Catalina	CSS	·	2.2 km	MPC · JPL
689802	2013 NM_{31}	—	July 14, 2013	Haleakala	Pan-STARRS 1	·	1.5 km	MPC · JPL
689803	2013 NZ_{33}	—	July 14, 2013	Haleakala	Pan-STARRS 1	·	990 m	MPC · JPL
689804	2013 NE_{35}	—	March 6, 2016	Haleakala	Pan-STARRS 1	·	760 m	MPC · JPL
689805	2013 NC_{40}	—	October 8, 2015	Haleakala	Pan-STARRS 1	·	2.4 km	MPC · JPL
689806	2013 NG_{42}	—	July 4, 2013	Haleakala	Pan-STARRS 1	·	1.4 km	MPC · JPL
689807	2013 NJ_{42}	—	July 6, 2013	Haleakala	Pan-STARRS 1	·	3.1 km	MPC · JPL
689808	2013 NZ_{48}	—	July 13, 2013	Haleakala	Pan-STARRS 1	·	2.7 km	MPC · JPL
689809	2013 ND_{51}	—	July 15, 2013	Haleakala	Pan-STARRS 1	V	530 m	MPC · JPL
689810	2013 NJ_{52}	—	July 15, 2013	Haleakala	Pan-STARRS 1	·	1.3 km	MPC · JPL
689811	2013 NX_{53}	—	July 14, 2013	Haleakala	Pan-STARRS 1	·	910 m	MPC · JPL
689812	2013 ND_{54}	—	July 13, 2013	Haleakala	Pan-STARRS 1	·	810 m	MPC · JPL
689813	2013 NT_{62}	—	July 14, 2013	Haleakala	Pan-STARRS 1	·	1.1 km	MPC · JPL
689814	2013 NU_{64}	—	July 12, 2013	Haleakala	Pan-STARRS 1	·	810 m	MPC · JPL
689815	2013 NZ_{64}	—	May 28, 2009	Mount Lemmon	Mount Lemmon Survey	·	960 m	MPC · JPL
689816	2013 NO_{67}	—	January 29, 2012	Kitt Peak	Spacewatch	·	820 m	MPC · JPL
689817	2013 ON_{3}	—	January 24, 2006	Piszkéstető	K. Sárneczky	·	3.2 km	MPC · JPL
689818	2013 OP_{7}	—	July 30, 2013	Kitt Peak	Spacewatch	·	3.0 km	MPC · JPL
689819	2013 OQ_{7}	—	July 30, 2013	Kitt Peak	Spacewatch	·	1.2 km	MPC · JPL
689820	2013 OY_{15}	—	July 16, 2013	Haleakala	Pan-STARRS 1	·	3.2 km	MPC · JPL
689821	2013 PX_{1}	—	August 2, 2013	Haleakala	Pan-STARRS 1	·	3.0 km	MPC · JPL
689822 Anderson	2013 PU_{10}	Anderson	August 3, 2013	Tincana	M. Kusiak, M. Żołnowski	·	1.0 km	MPC · JPL
689823	2013 PU_{12}	—	September 3, 2002	Palomar	NEAT	TIR	3.1 km	MPC · JPL
689824	2013 PT_{16}	—	October 21, 2003	Kitt Peak	Spacewatch	EOS	1.5 km	MPC · JPL
689825	2013 PU_{18}	—	February 25, 2006	Kitt Peak	Spacewatch	EOS	1.9 km	MPC · JPL
689826	2013 PP_{25}	—	July 14, 2013	Haleakala	Pan-STARRS 1	EOS	1.5 km	MPC · JPL
689827	2013 PH_{32}	—	August 7, 2013	Kitt Peak	Spacewatch	·	3.5 km	MPC · JPL
689828	2013 PF_{39}	—	September 27, 2002	Palomar	NEAT	·	2.8 km	MPC · JPL
689829	2013 PK_{44}	—	July 15, 2013	Haleakala	Pan-STARRS 1	·	2.4 km	MPC · JPL
689830	2013 PL_{52}	—	April 2, 2011	Mount Lemmon	Mount Lemmon Survey	VER	2.7 km	MPC · JPL
689831	2013 PU_{53}	—	November 30, 2003	Kitt Peak	Spacewatch	·	740 m	MPC · JPL
689832	2013 PG_{55}	—	August 14, 2013	Haleakala	Pan-STARRS 1	·	920 m	MPC · JPL
689833	2013 PQ_{64}	—	July 15, 2013	Haleakala	Pan-STARRS 1	VER	2.6 km	MPC · JPL
689834	2013 PP_{65}	—	September 19, 2000	Kitt Peak	Spacewatch	·	590 m	MPC · JPL
689835	2013 PH_{68}	—	January 28, 2011	Mount Lemmon	Mount Lemmon Survey	·	1.5 km	MPC · JPL
689836	2013 PM_{70}	—	September 11, 2002	Palomar	NEAT	·	3.2 km	MPC · JPL
689837	2013 PF_{72}	—	September 20, 2003	Palomar	NEAT	·	2.0 km	MPC · JPL
689838	2013 PJ_{72}	—	August 2, 2013	Haleakala	Pan-STARRS 1	PHO	760 m	MPC · JPL
689839	2013 PC_{79}	—	September 25, 2008	Kitt Peak	Spacewatch	·	2.1 km	MPC · JPL
689840	2013 PA_{80}	—	August 8, 2013	Haleakala	Pan-STARRS 1	·	2.6 km	MPC · JPL
689841	2013 PG_{82}	—	August 15, 2013	Haleakala	Pan-STARRS 1	·	990 m	MPC · JPL
689842	2013 PM_{87}	—	August 15, 2013	Haleakala	Pan-STARRS 1	V	510 m	MPC · JPL
689843	2013 PT_{90}	—	August 2, 2013	Haleakala	Pan-STARRS 1	·	2.3 km	MPC · JPL
689844	2013 PR_{92}	—	October 30, 2014	Mount Lemmon	Mount Lemmon Survey	·	2.8 km	MPC · JPL
689845	2013 PL_{96}	—	August 4, 2013	Haleakala	Pan-STARRS 1	·	850 m	MPC · JPL
689846	2013 PO_{100}	—	August 12, 2013	Haleakala	Pan-STARRS 1	·	780 m	MPC · JPL
689847	2013 PZ_{107}	—	August 9, 2013	Haleakala	Pan-STARRS 1	·	1.2 km	MPC · JPL
689848	2013 PD_{113}	—	August 15, 2013	Haleakala	Pan-STARRS 1	SYL	3.7 km	MPC · JPL
689849	2013 PU_{113}	—	August 9, 2013	Kitt Peak	Spacewatch	·	1.6 km	MPC · JPL
689850	2013 PD_{114}	—	August 15, 2013	Haleakala	Pan-STARRS 1	·	1.8 km	MPC · JPL
689851	2013 PS_{120}	—	August 15, 2013	Haleakala	Pan-STARRS 1	·	640 m	MPC · JPL
689852	2013 QP_{5}	—	February 5, 2011	Haleakala	Pan-STARRS 1	·	1.9 km	MPC · JPL
689853	2013 QT_{16}	—	September 30, 2005	Catalina	CSS	EUN	1.1 km	MPC · JPL
689854	2013 QL_{21}	—	December 10, 2009	Mount Lemmon	Mount Lemmon Survey	·	2.2 km	MPC · JPL
689855	2013 QQ_{24}	—	September 18, 2003	Kitt Peak	Spacewatch	EOS	1.4 km	MPC · JPL
689856	2013 QR_{29}	—	August 8, 2013	Kitt Peak	Spacewatch	·	880 m	MPC · JPL
689857	2013 QM_{30}	—	August 29, 2013	Haleakala	Pan-STARRS 1	·	1.2 km	MPC · JPL
689858	2013 QJ_{38}	—	August 28, 2013	Mount Lemmon	Mount Lemmon Survey	·	2.8 km	MPC · JPL
689859	2013 QC_{45}	—	February 7, 2008	Mount Lemmon	Mount Lemmon Survey	·	980 m	MPC · JPL
689860	2013 QH_{52}	—	August 30, 2013	Haleakala	Pan-STARRS 1	·	3.6 km	MPC · JPL
689861	2013 QQ_{52}	—	October 14, 2010	Mount Lemmon	Mount Lemmon Survey	·	570 m	MPC · JPL
689862	2013 QM_{54}	—	August 13, 2013	Kitt Peak	Spacewatch	·	940 m	MPC · JPL
689863	2013 QT_{56}	—	August 26, 2013	Haleakala	Pan-STARRS 1	T_{j} (2.99)	3.2 km	MPC · JPL
689864	2013 QQ_{61}	—	August 8, 2013	Haleakala	Pan-STARRS 1	·	2.9 km	MPC · JPL
689865	2013 QA_{62}	—	February 5, 2011	Haleakala	Pan-STARRS 1	EOS	1.4 km	MPC · JPL
689866	2013 QD_{63}	—	June 19, 2013	Mount Lemmon	Mount Lemmon Survey	·	1.0 km	MPC · JPL
689867	2013 QY_{75}	—	August 12, 2013	Haleakala	Pan-STARRS 1	·	2.7 km	MPC · JPL
689868	2013 QT_{76}	—	October 20, 2003	Kitt Peak	Spacewatch	EOS	1.7 km	MPC · JPL
689869	2013 QM_{80}	—	February 11, 2004	Kitt Peak	Spacewatch	·	1.2 km	MPC · JPL
689870	2013 QS_{85}	—	April 18, 2012	Mount Lemmon	Mount Lemmon Survey	·	1.1 km	MPC · JPL
689871	2013 QC_{93}	—	August 9, 2013	Kitt Peak	Spacewatch	·	3.3 km	MPC · JPL
689872	2013 QN_{98}	—	July 26, 2017	Haleakala	Pan-STARRS 1	·	1.0 km	MPC · JPL
689873	2013 QV_{99}	—	August 31, 2013	Haleakala	Pan-STARRS 1	(5)	1.2 km	MPC · JPL
689874	2013 RG_{7}	—	September 30, 2003	Kitt Peak	Spacewatch	·	610 m	MPC · JPL
689875	2013 RB_{9}	—	September 2, 2013	Haleakala	Pan-STARRS 1	·	780 m	MPC · JPL
689876	2013 RK_{11}	—	April 6, 2008	Mount Lemmon	Mount Lemmon Survey	·	700 m	MPC · JPL
689877	2013 RQ_{31}	—	September 5, 2013	Palomar	Palomar Transient Factory	(116763)	1.8 km	MPC · JPL
689878	2013 RU_{33}	—	September 2, 2013	Palomar	Palomar Transient Factory	·	3.1 km	MPC · JPL
689879	2013 RT_{42}	—	January 25, 2007	Kitt Peak	Spacewatch	·	1.0 km	MPC · JPL
689880	2013 RT_{48}	—	September 2, 2013	Mount Lemmon	Mount Lemmon Survey	LUT	3.3 km	MPC · JPL
689881	2013 RP_{49}	—	September 10, 2013	Haleakala	Pan-STARRS 1	·	2.0 km	MPC · JPL
689882	2013 RQ_{50}	—	January 6, 2010	Kitt Peak	Spacewatch	·	2.5 km	MPC · JPL
689883	2013 RL_{60}	—	September 10, 2013	Haleakala	Pan-STARRS 1	·	3.0 km	MPC · JPL
689884	2013 RT_{60}	—	September 11, 2013	Palomar	Palomar Transient Factory	·	2.8 km	MPC · JPL
689885	2013 RK_{62}	—	October 30, 2002	La Palma	La Palma	·	1.1 km	MPC · JPL
689886	2013 RE_{70}	—	September 1, 2013	Mount Bigelow	CSS	NYS	1.1 km	MPC · JPL
689887	2013 RM_{70}	—	September 13, 2013	Kitt Peak	Spacewatch	·	1.3 km	MPC · JPL
689888	2013 RE_{78}	—	September 1, 2013	Haleakala	Pan-STARRS 1	·	840 m	MPC · JPL
689889	2013 RV_{90}	—	August 21, 2006	Kitt Peak	Spacewatch	·	550 m	MPC · JPL
689890	2013 RW_{97}	—	September 8, 2013	Palomar	Palomar Transient Factory	·	2.9 km	MPC · JPL
689891	2013 RN_{100}	—	September 6, 2013	Kitt Peak	Spacewatch	·	2.8 km	MPC · JPL
689892	2013 RU_{100}	—	September 1, 2013	Mount Lemmon	Mount Lemmon Survey	HNS	850 m	MPC · JPL
689893	2013 RD_{103}	—	September 14, 2005	Kitt Peak	Spacewatch	·	770 m	MPC · JPL
689894	2013 RJ_{103}	—	November 9, 2009	Mount Lemmon	Mount Lemmon Survey	·	1.2 km	MPC · JPL
689895	2013 RM_{108}	—	September 15, 2013	Mount Lemmon	Mount Lemmon Survey	MAR	710 m	MPC · JPL
689896	2013 RR_{108}	—	September 9, 2013	Haleakala	Pan-STARRS 1	·	830 m	MPC · JPL
689897	2013 RV_{109}	—	September 12, 2013	Mount Lemmon	Mount Lemmon Survey	·	2.6 km	MPC · JPL
689898	2013 RL_{110}	—	September 6, 2013	Mount Lemmon	Mount Lemmon Survey	·	1 km	MPC · JPL
689899	2013 RS_{114}	—	April 19, 2012	Catalina	CSS	T_{j} (2.99) · EUP	2.8 km	MPC · JPL
689900	2013 RW_{115}	—	September 9, 2013	Haleakala	Pan-STARRS 1	·	970 m	MPC · JPL

== 689901–690000 ==
back to top

Designation			Discovery			Properties		Ref
Permanent	Provisional	Named after	Date	Site	Discoverer(s)	Category	Diam.	Ref
689901	2013 RN_{129}	—	September 5, 2013	Kitt Peak	Spacewatch	VER	2.5 km	MPC · JPL
689902	2013 RY_{130}	—	September 1, 2013	Mount Lemmon	Mount Lemmon Survey	·	780 m	MPC · JPL
689903	2013 RL_{132}	—	September 9, 2013	Haleakala	Pan-STARRS 1	·	430 m	MPC · JPL
689904	2013 RZ_{132}	—	September 12, 2013	Mount Lemmon	Mount Lemmon Survey	·	820 m	MPC · JPL
689905	2013 RR_{134}	—	September 13, 2013	Mount Lemmon	Mount Lemmon Survey	·	820 m	MPC · JPL
689906	2013 RV_{134}	—	September 2, 2013	Mount Lemmon	Mount Lemmon Survey	MAR	650 m	MPC · JPL
689907	2013 RX_{143}	—	September 6, 2013	Mount Lemmon	Mount Lemmon Survey	·	1.2 km	MPC · JPL
689908	2013 RS_{147}	—	September 14, 2013	Haleakala	Pan-STARRS 1	·	2.8 km	MPC · JPL
689909	2013 RY_{147}	—	September 14, 2013	Kitt Peak	Spacewatch	L5	7.0 km	MPC · JPL
689910	2013 RS_{153}	—	September 6, 2013	Kitt Peak	Spacewatch	·	1.3 km	MPC · JPL
689911	2013 RK_{156}	—	September 1, 2013	Mount Lemmon	Mount Lemmon Survey	HNS	730 m	MPC · JPL
689912	2013 SP_{6}	—	April 3, 2011	Haleakala	Pan-STARRS 1	·	2.5 km	MPC · JPL
689913	2013 SP_{18}	—	August 30, 2005	Kitt Peak	Spacewatch	·	810 m	MPC · JPL
689914	2013 SF_{34}	—	April 6, 2005	Kitt Peak	Spacewatch	·	980 m	MPC · JPL
689915	2013 SX_{47}	—	March 5, 2011	Catalina	CSS	·	1.3 km	MPC · JPL
689916	2013 SS_{48}	—	March 24, 2012	Catalina	CSS	·	850 m	MPC · JPL
689917	2013 SQ_{50}	—	September 28, 2013	Haleakala	Pan-STARRS 1	EUN	960 m	MPC · JPL
689918	2013 SO_{57}	—	September 30, 2013	Mount Lemmon	Mount Lemmon Survey	·	1.2 km	MPC · JPL
689919	2013 SX_{57}	—	September 30, 2013	Calvin-Rehoboth	L. A. Molnar	·	1.3 km	MPC · JPL
689920	2013 SO_{64}	—	September 1, 2013	Catalina	CSS	·	930 m	MPC · JPL
689921	2013 SY_{64}	—	September 23, 2013	Mount Lemmon	Mount Lemmon Survey	·	980 m	MPC · JPL
689922	2013 SF_{65}	—	March 14, 2011	Mount Lemmon	Mount Lemmon Survey	KOR	1.1 km	MPC · JPL
689923	2013 SR_{66}	—	March 10, 2008	Kitt Peak	Spacewatch	CLA	1.4 km	MPC · JPL
689924	2013 SS_{68}	—	January 30, 2008	Mount Lemmon	Mount Lemmon Survey	NYS	1.1 km	MPC · JPL
689925	2013 SE_{72}	—	September 6, 2013	Mount Lemmon	Mount Lemmon Survey	3:2	4.0 km	MPC · JPL
689926	2013 SF_{79}	—	September 30, 2013	Mount Lemmon	Mount Lemmon Survey	KON	1.8 km	MPC · JPL
689927	2013 SF_{81}	—	October 21, 2006	Mount Lemmon	Mount Lemmon Survey	·	1.1 km	MPC · JPL
689928	2013 SU_{88}	—	February 14, 2012	Haleakala	Pan-STARRS 1	·	850 m	MPC · JPL
689929	2013 SE_{94}	—	March 14, 2011	Mount Lemmon	Mount Lemmon Survey	·	1.6 km	MPC · JPL
689930	2013 ST_{96}	—	September 24, 2013	Mount Lemmon	Mount Lemmon Survey	·	720 m	MPC · JPL
689931	2013 SQ_{97}	—	November 18, 2008	Kitt Peak	Spacewatch	·	2.2 km	MPC · JPL
689932	2013 SH_{100}	—	October 9, 2002	Palomar	NEAT	HYG	2.5 km	MPC · JPL
689933	2013 SD_{103}	—	September 16, 2013	Mount Lemmon	Mount Lemmon Survey	·	1.5 km	MPC · JPL
689934	2013 SL_{103}	—	September 16, 2013	Mount Lemmon	Mount Lemmon Survey	·	1.4 km	MPC · JPL
689935	2013 SY_{107}	—	September 30, 2013	Mount Lemmon	Mount Lemmon Survey	·	2.8 km	MPC · JPL
689936	2013 TK_{1}	—	July 9, 2005	Kitt Peak	Spacewatch	·	1.0 km	MPC · JPL
689937	2013 TQ_{10}	—	September 3, 2013	Calar Alto	F. Hormuth	·	1.2 km	MPC · JPL
689938	2013 TZ_{10}	—	April 11, 2005	Kitt Peak	Deep Ecliptic Survey	·	2.8 km	MPC · JPL
689939	2013 TS_{40}	—	November 11, 2006	Mount Lemmon	Mount Lemmon Survey	·	860 m	MPC · JPL
689940	2013 TM_{47}	—	April 9, 2006	Kitt Peak	Spacewatch	LIX	3.7 km	MPC · JPL
689941	2013 TA_{54}	—	August 11, 2001	Calar Alto	K. Sárneczky, G. Szabó	·	3.3 km	MPC · JPL
689942	2013 TF_{58}	—	May 21, 2012	Haleakala	Pan-STARRS 1	·	1.6 km	MPC · JPL
689943	2013 TR_{61}	—	September 26, 2013	Catalina	CSS	·	1.6 km	MPC · JPL
689944	2013 TS_{64}	—	October 4, 2013	Mount Lemmon	Mount Lemmon Survey	·	3.0 km	MPC · JPL
689945	2013 TE_{66}	—	October 4, 2013	Mount Lemmon	Mount Lemmon Survey	HNS	910 m	MPC · JPL
689946	2013 TY_{67}	—	December 17, 2001	Kitt Peak	Spacewatch	RAF	650 m	MPC · JPL
689947	2013 TS_{72}	—	July 4, 2005	Palomar	NEAT	·	1.2 km	MPC · JPL
689948	2013 TY_{80}	—	December 2, 2005	Kitt Peak	Spacewatch	·	1.0 km	MPC · JPL
689949	2013 TQ_{92}	—	October 1, 2013	Kitt Peak	Spacewatch	HNS	880 m	MPC · JPL
689950	2013 TK_{94}	—	October 1, 2013	Palomar	Palomar Transient Factory	EUN	960 m	MPC · JPL
689951	2013 TT_{103}	—	March 4, 2005	Mount Lemmon	Mount Lemmon Survey	·	530 m	MPC · JPL
689952	2013 TS_{123}	—	October 5, 2013	Haleakala	Pan-STARRS 1	HNS	760 m	MPC · JPL
689953	2013 TD_{125}	—	October 1, 2003	Kitt Peak	Spacewatch	·	530 m	MPC · JPL
689954	2013 TZ_{134}	—	August 17, 2009	Kitt Peak	Spacewatch	·	1.1 km	MPC · JPL
689955	2013 TG_{141}	—	June 4, 2006	Mount Lemmon	Mount Lemmon Survey	THM	2.2 km	MPC · JPL
689956	2013 TG_{146}	—	August 8, 2013	Haleakala	Pan-STARRS 1	·	1.1 km	MPC · JPL
689957	2013 TO_{149}	—	October 5, 2013	Kitt Peak	M. W. Buie	VER	2.0 km	MPC · JPL
689958	2013 TY_{154}	—	September 16, 2006	Kitt Peak	Spacewatch	·	940 m	MPC · JPL
689959	2013 TL_{156}	—	September 11, 2004	Kitt Peak	Spacewatch	·	1.3 km	MPC · JPL
689960	2013 TW_{162}	—	September 12, 2007	Mount Lemmon	Mount Lemmon Survey	·	2.6 km	MPC · JPL
689961	2013 TY_{162}	—	September 15, 2007	Mount Lemmon	Mount Lemmon Survey	THM	2.5 km	MPC · JPL
689962	2013 TQ_{166}	—	October 3, 2013	Mount Lemmon	Mount Lemmon Survey	·	1.3 km	MPC · JPL
689963	2013 TR_{168}	—	October 4, 2013	Mount Lemmon	Mount Lemmon Survey	·	1.3 km	MPC · JPL
689964	2013 TB_{173}	—	October 3, 2013	Mount Lemmon	Mount Lemmon Survey	·	1.2 km	MPC · JPL
689965	2013 TU_{176}	—	October 8, 2013	Mount Lemmon	Mount Lemmon Survey	·	1.1 km	MPC · JPL
689966	2013 TQ_{185}	—	October 4, 2013	Catalina	CSS	·	920 m	MPC · JPL
689967	2013 TS_{188}	—	October 1, 2013	Mount Lemmon	Mount Lemmon Survey	MAR	800 m	MPC · JPL
689968	2013 TS_{194}	—	October 13, 2013	Kitt Peak	Spacewatch	·	1.2 km	MPC · JPL
689969	2013 TP_{195}	—	October 5, 2013	Haleakala	Pan-STARRS 1	·	2.2 km	MPC · JPL
689970	2013 TT_{197}	—	October 3, 2013	Haleakala	Pan-STARRS 1	·	1.1 km	MPC · JPL
689971	2013 TA_{199}	—	October 3, 2013	Haleakala	Pan-STARRS 1	HNS	800 m	MPC · JPL
689972	2013 TH_{200}	—	October 3, 2013	Haleakala	Pan-STARRS 1	·	1.0 km	MPC · JPL
689973	2013 TY_{200}	—	October 5, 2013	Haleakala	Pan-STARRS 1	HNS	710 m	MPC · JPL
689974	2013 TC_{201}	—	October 12, 2013	Mount Lemmon	Mount Lemmon Survey	·	2.4 km	MPC · JPL
689975	2013 TT_{201}	—	October 9, 2013	Mount Lemmon	Mount Lemmon Survey	EUN	830 m	MPC · JPL
689976	2013 TX_{209}	—	October 4, 2013	Mount Lemmon	Mount Lemmon Survey	3:2	4.2 km	MPC · JPL
689977	2013 TO_{211}	—	October 3, 2013	Kitt Peak	Spacewatch	·	1.4 km	MPC · JPL
689978	2013 TK_{212}	—	October 1, 2013	Mount Lemmon	Mount Lemmon Survey	·	1.0 km	MPC · JPL
689979	2013 TM_{212}	—	October 5, 2013	Mount Lemmon	Mount Lemmon Survey	MAR	720 m	MPC · JPL
689980	2013 TV_{226}	—	October 12, 2013	Kitt Peak	Spacewatch	·	1.0 km	MPC · JPL
689981	2013 TF_{227}	—	October 2, 2013	Haleakala	Pan-STARRS 1	·	970 m	MPC · JPL
689982	2013 TV_{234}	—	October 5, 2013	Haleakala	Pan-STARRS 1	·	1.0 km	MPC · JPL
689983	2013 TC_{236}	—	October 13, 2013	Mount Lemmon	Mount Lemmon Survey	·	920 m	MPC · JPL
689984	2013 UJ_{14}	—	August 1, 2009	Kitt Peak	Spacewatch	MAS	670 m	MPC · JPL
689985	2013 UV_{22}	—	October 25, 2013	Mount Lemmon	Mount Lemmon Survey	·	1.3 km	MPC · JPL
689986	2013 UF_{29}	—	April 18, 2015	Haleakala	Pan-STARRS 1	·	1.3 km	MPC · JPL
689987	2013 UG_{29}	—	January 23, 2015	Haleakala	Pan-STARRS 1	·	1.0 km	MPC · JPL
689988	2013 UC_{30}	—	October 28, 2013	Catalina	CSS	·	1.3 km	MPC · JPL
689989	2013 UY_{32}	—	October 31, 2013	Mount Lemmon	Mount Lemmon Survey	VER	2.8 km	MPC · JPL
689990	2013 UD_{34}	—	October 28, 2013	Kitt Peak	Spacewatch	EOS	1.7 km	MPC · JPL
689991	2013 UV_{36}	—	October 6, 2013	Mount Lemmon	Mount Lemmon Survey	HNS	880 m	MPC · JPL
689992	2013 UT_{39}	—	October 23, 2013	Mount Lemmon	Mount Lemmon Survey	·	850 m	MPC · JPL
689993	2013 UU_{47}	—	October 26, 2013	Mount Lemmon	Mount Lemmon Survey	·	1.3 km	MPC · JPL
689994	2013 UM_{49}	—	October 25, 2013	Mount Lemmon	Mount Lemmon Survey	·	1.3 km	MPC · JPL
689995	2013 UH_{50}	—	January 14, 2002	Kitt Peak	Spacewatch	·	1.2 km	MPC · JPL
689996	2013 UK_{56}	—	October 23, 2013	Mount Lemmon	Mount Lemmon Survey	·	1.2 km	MPC · JPL
689997	2013 VX	—	October 3, 2013	Kitt Peak	Spacewatch	JUN	950 m	MPC · JPL
689998	2013 VU_{6}	—	August 4, 2005	Palomar	NEAT	·	1.3 km	MPC · JPL
689999	2013 VS_{11}	—	October 31, 2013	Catalina	CSS	BAR	1.1 km	MPC · JPL
690000	2013 VH_{21}	—	October 3, 2013	Mount Lemmon	Mount Lemmon Survey	·	1.3 km	MPC · JPL

back to top

== Meaning of names ==
As minor planet discoveries are confirmed, they are given a permanent number by the IAU's Minor Planet Center (MPC), and the discoverers can then submit names for them, following the IAU's naming conventions. The list below concerns those minor planets in the specified number-range that have received names, and explains the meanings of those names.

Official naming citations of newly named small Solar System bodies are approved and published in a bulletin by IAU's Working Group for Small Bodies Nomenclature (WGSBN). Before May 2021, citations were published in MPC's Minor Planet Circulars for many decades. Recent citations can also be found on the JPL Small-Body Database (SBDB). Until his death in 2016, German astronomer Lutz D. Schmadel compiled these citations into the Dictionary of Minor Planet Names (DMP) and regularly updated the collection.

Based on Paul Herget's The Names of the Minor Planets, Schmadel also researched the unclear origin of numerous asteroids, most of which had been named prior to World War II. This article incorporates text from this source, which is in the public domain: SBDB New namings may only be added to this list below after official publication as the preannouncement of names is condemned. The WGSBN publishes a comprehensive guideline for the naming rules of non-cometary small Solar System bodies.

Named minor planet	Provisional	This minor planet was named for...	Ref · Catalog
689210 Salvadorjribas	2013 EH_{24}	Salvador J. Ribas (born 1978), Catalan astrophysicist who specialises in light pollution and night-sky quality research.	IAU · 689210
689822 Anderson	2013 PU_{10}	Wesley Wales Anderson, American film director, screenwriter, film producer and actor.	IAU · 689822
