= List of minor planets: 639001–640000 =

The following is a partial list of minor planets, running from minor-planet number 639001 through 640000, inclusive. The primary data for this and other partial lists is based on JPL's "Small-Body Orbital Elements" and data available from the Minor Planet Center. Critical list information is also provided by the MPC, unless otherwise specified from Lowell Observatory. A detailed description of the table's columns and additional sources are given on the main page including a complete list of every page in this series, and a statistical break-up on the dynamical classification of minor planets.

Also see the summary list of all named bodies in numerical and alphabetical order, and the corresponding naming citations for the number range of this particular list. New namings may only be added to this list after official publication, as the preannouncement of names is condemned by the Working Group for Small Bodies Nomenclature of the International Astronomical Union.

Near-Earth obj.	MBA (inner)	MBA (outer)	Centaur
Mars-crosser	MBA (middle)	Jupiter trojan	Trans-Neptunian obj.
Unclassified

== 639001–639100 ==
Designation			Discovery			Properties		Ref
Permanent	Provisional	Named after	Date	Site	Discoverer(s)	Category	Diam.	Ref
639001	2016 LH_{68}	—	March 26, 2003	Palomar	NEAT	·	870 m	MPC · JPL
639002	2016 MB_{2}	—	February 26, 2014	Mount Lemmon	Mount Lemmon Survey	L4	8.0 km	MPC · JPL
639003	2016 MM_{7}	—	June 29, 2016	Haleakala	Pan-STARRS 1	·	2.4 km	MPC · JPL
639004	2016 NF_{3}	—	July 3, 2016	Mount Lemmon	Mount Lemmon Survey	·	2.6 km	MPC · JPL
639005	2016 NV_{3}	—	June 8, 2011	Haleakala	Pan-STARRS 1	EOS	2.4 km	MPC · JPL
639006	2016 NK_{5}	—	January 19, 2012	Haleakala	Pan-STARRS 1	·	600 m	MPC · JPL
639007	2016 ND_{7}	—	February 11, 2004	Kitt Peak	Spacewatch	PHO	900 m	MPC · JPL
639008	2016 NB_{13}	—	August 21, 2006	Kitt Peak	Spacewatch	(2076)	540 m	MPC · JPL
639009	2016 NG_{18}	—	March 15, 2015	Haleakala	Pan-STARRS 1	·	3.3 km	MPC · JPL
639010	2016 NU_{19}	—	December 13, 2012	Mount Lemmon	Mount Lemmon Survey	·	2.0 km	MPC · JPL
639011	2016 NX_{20}	—	July 13, 2013	Haleakala	Pan-STARRS 1	·	640 m	MPC · JPL
639012	2016 NO_{23}	—	August 3, 2001	Palomar	NEAT	PHO	1.4 km	MPC · JPL
639013	2016 NT_{30}	—	October 1, 2011	Kitt Peak	Spacewatch	·	2.6 km	MPC · JPL
639014	2016 NZ_{32}	—	March 30, 2003	Kitt Peak	Deep Ecliptic Survey	·	900 m	MPC · JPL
639015	2016 NB_{34}	—	September 11, 2010	Mount Lemmon	Mount Lemmon Survey	·	900 m	MPC · JPL
639016	2016 NC_{35}	—	February 28, 2008	Mount Lemmon	Mount Lemmon Survey	V	510 m	MPC · JPL
639017	2016 NN_{35}	—	March 21, 2009	Catalina	CSS	EOS	1.5 km	MPC · JPL
639018	2016 NM_{37}	—	October 4, 2013	Catalina	CSS	·	650 m	MPC · JPL
639019	2016 NU_{40}	—	September 14, 2013	Mount Lemmon	Mount Lemmon Survey	·	440 m	MPC · JPL
639020	2016 NT_{43}	—	November 13, 2010	Mount Lemmon	Mount Lemmon Survey	·	610 m	MPC · JPL
639021	2016 NH_{44}	—	December 6, 2007	Mount Lemmon	Mount Lemmon Survey	·	3.5 km	MPC · JPL
639022	2016 NS_{45}	—	March 4, 2012	Mount Lemmon	Mount Lemmon Survey	·	610 m	MPC · JPL
639023	2016 NP_{46}	—	February 27, 2012	Haleakala	Pan-STARRS 1	·	660 m	MPC · JPL
639024	2016 NJ_{50}	—	December 13, 2006	Catalina	CSS	·	1.0 km	MPC · JPL
639025	2016 NL_{65}	—	January 18, 2004	Palomar	NEAT	V	560 m	MPC · JPL
639026	2016 NM_{69}	—	July 11, 2005	Mount Lemmon	Mount Lemmon Survey	(5651)	2.8 km	MPC · JPL
639027	2016 NS_{71}	—	June 22, 2011	Nogales	M. Schwartz, P. R. Holvorcem	·	2.4 km	MPC · JPL
639028	2016 NY_{72}	—	July 7, 2016	Haleakala	Pan-STARRS 1	·	2.6 km	MPC · JPL
639029	2016 NK_{73}	—	August 8, 2005	Cerro Tololo	Deep Ecliptic Survey	·	2.5 km	MPC · JPL
639030	2016 NK_{74}	—	January 10, 2003	Kitt Peak	Spacewatch	EOS	2.1 km	MPC · JPL
639031	2016 NZ_{74}	—	April 21, 2012	Mount Lemmon	Mount Lemmon Survey	·	650 m	MPC · JPL
639032	2016 NO_{85}	—	July 11, 2016	Haleakala	Pan-STARRS 1	·	2.6 km	MPC · JPL
639033	2016 NY_{109}	—	July 14, 2016	Haleakala	Pan-STARRS 1	HOF	1.8 km	MPC · JPL
639034	2016 NQ_{132}	—	July 7, 2016	Haleakala	Pan-STARRS 1	·	880 m	MPC · JPL
639035	2016 NT_{132}	—	July 13, 2016	Haleakala	Pan-STARRS 1	·	510 m	MPC · JPL
639036	2016 NB_{143}	—	August 12, 2004	Mauna Kea	P. A. Wiegert	·	2.4 km	MPC · JPL
639037	2016 OV_{2}	—	April 28, 2009	Mount Lemmon	Mount Lemmon Survey	·	520 m	MPC · JPL
639038	2016 OR_{8}	—	August 5, 2005	Palomar	NEAT	EOS	2.0 km	MPC · JPL
639039	2016 OE_{12}	—	July 17, 2016	Haleakala	Pan-STARRS 1	·	3.7 km	MPC · JPL
639040	2016 PD_{5}	—	January 5, 2013	Kitt Peak	Spacewatch	·	2.3 km	MPC · JPL
639041	2016 PV_{11}	—	February 25, 2007	Mount Lemmon	Mount Lemmon Survey	·	1.8 km	MPC · JPL
639042	2016 PA_{14}	—	December 23, 2012	Haleakala	Pan-STARRS 1	·	2.6 km	MPC · JPL
639043	2016 PV_{14}	—	February 3, 2012	Haleakala	Pan-STARRS 1	·	630 m	MPC · JPL
639044	2016 PR_{21}	—	August 7, 2016	Haleakala	Pan-STARRS 1	·	3.1 km	MPC · JPL
639045	2016 PC_{23}	—	February 25, 2014	Kitt Peak	Spacewatch	·	3.0 km	MPC · JPL
639046	2016 PO_{27}	—	February 20, 2009	Catalina	CSS	·	820 m	MPC · JPL
639047	2016 PQ_{27}	—	October 20, 2006	Mount Lemmon	Mount Lemmon Survey	(31811)	2.9 km	MPC · JPL
639048	2016 PU_{27}	—	November 19, 2006	Kitt Peak	Spacewatch	·	3.0 km	MPC · JPL
639049	2016 PD_{28}	—	January 18, 2008	Mount Lemmon	Mount Lemmon Survey	EOS	1.9 km	MPC · JPL
639050	2016 PG_{42}	—	November 18, 2006	Mount Lemmon	Mount Lemmon Survey	·	2.8 km	MPC · JPL
639051	2016 PK_{47}	—	April 20, 2009	Mount Lemmon	Mount Lemmon Survey	·	680 m	MPC · JPL
639052	2016 PO_{47}	—	January 1, 2008	Mount Lemmon	Mount Lemmon Survey	EOS	1.8 km	MPC · JPL
639053	2016 PD_{48}	—	February 24, 2014	Haleakala	Pan-STARRS 1	·	2.9 km	MPC · JPL
639054	2016 PA_{52}	—	November 1, 2006	Kitt Peak	Spacewatch	EOS	1.7 km	MPC · JPL
639055	2016 PH_{53}	—	February 28, 2012	Haleakala	Pan-STARRS 1	·	610 m	MPC · JPL
639056	2016 PL_{67}	—	June 4, 2005	Kitt Peak	Spacewatch	·	1.4 km	MPC · JPL
639057	2016 PB_{77}	—	October 22, 2003	Kitt Peak	Spacewatch	·	680 m	MPC · JPL
639058	2016 PD_{77}	—	October 20, 2003	Kitt Peak	Spacewatch	·	680 m	MPC · JPL
639059	2016 PH_{90}	—	October 20, 2011	Mount Lemmon	Mount Lemmon Survey	THM	2.3 km	MPC · JPL
639060	2016 PY_{90}	—	April 11, 2005	Mount Lemmon	Mount Lemmon Survey	·	1.6 km	MPC · JPL
639061	2016 PJ_{101}	—	February 18, 2015	Haleakala	Pan-STARRS 1	·	550 m	MPC · JPL
639062	2016 PX_{101}	—	October 10, 2007	Kitt Peak	Spacewatch	·	2.0 km	MPC · JPL
639063	2016 PM_{102}	—	October 1, 2000	Apache Point	SDSS Collaboration	·	3.4 km	MPC · JPL
639064	2016 PO_{103}	—	October 17, 2012	Mount Lemmon	Mount Lemmon Survey	·	1.6 km	MPC · JPL
639065	2016 PD_{122}	—	October 27, 2006	Kitt Peak	Spacewatch	·	700 m	MPC · JPL
639066	2016 PB_{127}	—	August 14, 2016	Haleakala	Pan-STARRS 1	·	2.2 km	MPC · JPL
639067	2016 PM_{152}	—	August 7, 2016	Haleakala	Pan-STARRS 1	·	2.7 km	MPC · JPL
639068	2016 PV_{155}	—	August 8, 2016	Haleakala	Pan-STARRS 1	·	1.8 km	MPC · JPL
639069	2016 PA_{190}	—	August 2, 2016	Haleakala	Pan-STARRS 1	·	720 m	MPC · JPL
639070	2016 PU_{200}	—	August 14, 2016	Haleakala	Pan-STARRS 1	·	2.7 km	MPC · JPL
639071	2016 PY_{245}	—	March 21, 2012	Mount Lemmon	Mount Lemmon Survey	·	500 m	MPC · JPL
639072	2016 PO_{254}	—	August 3, 2016	Haleakala	Pan-STARRS 1	·	2.6 km	MPC · JPL
639073	2016 QW_{3}	—	December 19, 2004	Mount Lemmon	Mount Lemmon Survey	·	680 m	MPC · JPL
639074	2016 QF_{4}	—	November 20, 2006	Kitt Peak	Spacewatch	·	640 m	MPC · JPL
639075	2016 QA_{12}	—	August 10, 2016	Haleakala	Pan-STARRS 1	·	3.7 km	MPC · JPL
639076	2016 QX_{12}	—	January 29, 2011	Mount Lemmon	Mount Lemmon Survey	·	730 m	MPC · JPL
639077	2016 QU_{13}	—	October 8, 1999	Kitt Peak	Spacewatch	·	760 m	MPC · JPL
639078	2016 QH_{14}	—	August 28, 2006	Kitt Peak	Spacewatch	·	750 m	MPC · JPL
639079	2016 QF_{16}	—	April 28, 2011	Haleakala	Pan-STARRS 1	PHO	1.3 km	MPC · JPL
639080	2016 QB_{17}	—	September 30, 2003	Kitt Peak	Spacewatch	·	710 m	MPC · JPL
639081	2016 QT_{19}	—	April 15, 2012	Haleakala	Pan-STARRS 1	·	720 m	MPC · JPL
639082	2016 QA_{20}	—	February 12, 2008	Mount Lemmon	Mount Lemmon Survey	·	770 m	MPC · JPL
639083	2016 QP_{20}	—	September 15, 2009	Mount Lemmon	Mount Lemmon Survey	V	580 m	MPC · JPL
639084	2016 QM_{22}	—	October 23, 2006	Mount Lemmon	Mount Lemmon Survey	·	710 m	MPC · JPL
639085	2016 QQ_{23}	—	January 11, 2008	Kitt Peak	Spacewatch	·	2.7 km	MPC · JPL
639086	2016 QT_{23}	—	September 17, 2009	Catalina	CSS	·	990 m	MPC · JPL
639087	2016 QJ_{26}	—	March 17, 2005	Kitt Peak	Spacewatch	·	640 m	MPC · JPL
639088	2016 QY_{28}	—	August 14, 2016	Haleakala	Pan-STARRS 1	·	3.6 km	MPC · JPL
639089	2016 QY_{29}	—	January 17, 2007	Kitt Peak	Spacewatch	·	990 m	MPC · JPL
639090	2016 QW_{36}	—	January 18, 2008	Mount Lemmon	Mount Lemmon Survey	·	3.0 km	MPC · JPL
639091	2016 QG_{37}	—	February 22, 2007	Kitt Peak	Spacewatch	·	3.1 km	MPC · JPL
639092	2016 QO_{42}	—	July 12, 2005	Mount Lemmon	Mount Lemmon Survey	MAS	750 m	MPC · JPL
639093	2016 QF_{43}	—	February 28, 2008	Mount Lemmon	Mount Lemmon Survey	·	650 m	MPC · JPL
639094	2016 QK_{47}	—	September 17, 2006	Kitt Peak	Spacewatch	·	680 m	MPC · JPL
639095	2016 QX_{51}	—	April 27, 2012	Mount Lemmon	Mount Lemmon Survey	·	670 m	MPC · JPL
639096	2016 QY_{53}	—	May 9, 2002	Palomar	NEAT	·	840 m	MPC · JPL
639097	2016 QJ_{58}	—	January 4, 2013	Kitt Peak	Spacewatch	·	4.8 km	MPC · JPL
639098	2016 QY_{58}	—	January 18, 2008	Mount Lemmon	Mount Lemmon Survey	·	2.8 km	MPC · JPL
639099	2016 QB_{60}	—	March 5, 2008	Mount Lemmon	Mount Lemmon Survey	·	650 m	MPC · JPL
639100	2016 QW_{60}	—	September 23, 2011	Haleakala	Pan-STARRS 1	VER	2.7 km	MPC · JPL

== 639101–639200 ==
back to top

Designation			Discovery			Properties		Ref
Permanent	Provisional	Named after	Date	Site	Discoverer(s)	Category	Diam.	Ref
639101	2016 QO_{65}	—	July 7, 2016	Haleakala	Pan-STARRS 1	·	2.8 km	MPC · JPL
639102	2016 QX_{66}	—	October 18, 2012	Haleakala	Pan-STARRS 1	·	1.7 km	MPC · JPL
639103	2016 QG_{67}	—	August 20, 2003	Palomar	NEAT	·	590 m	MPC · JPL
639104	2016 QO_{67}	—	March 29, 2009	Kitt Peak	Spacewatch	·	2.5 km	MPC · JPL
639105	2016 QD_{69}	—	August 29, 2006	Kitt Peak	Spacewatch	·	900 m	MPC · JPL
639106	2016 QY_{71}	—	November 9, 2013	Kitt Peak	Spacewatch	·	980 m	MPC · JPL
639107	2016 QC_{90}	—	April 28, 2008	Mount Lemmon	Mount Lemmon Survey	·	770 m	MPC · JPL
639108	2016 QG_{113}	—	August 30, 2016	Haleakala	Pan-STARRS 1	·	2.6 km	MPC · JPL
639109	2016 QW_{155}	—	August 29, 2016	Mount Lemmon	Mount Lemmon Survey	·	470 m	MPC · JPL
639110	2016 RU_{2}	—	April 29, 2008	Mount Lemmon	Mount Lemmon Survey	V	740 m	MPC · JPL
639111	2016 RZ_{2}	—	September 26, 2006	Kitt Peak	Spacewatch	·	790 m	MPC · JPL
639112	2016 RL_{14}	—	January 29, 2011	Mount Lemmon	Mount Lemmon Survey	·	770 m	MPC · JPL
639113	2016 RZ_{15}	—	January 1, 2009	Kitt Peak	Spacewatch	·	2.1 km	MPC · JPL
639114	2016 RD_{16}	—	May 25, 2006	Mauna Kea	P. A. Wiegert	·	1.4 km	MPC · JPL
639115	2016 RC_{22}	—	November 10, 2013	Mount Lemmon	Mount Lemmon Survey	·	780 m	MPC · JPL
639116	2016 RK_{23}	—	July 8, 2007	Lulin	LUSS	ADE	2.8 km	MPC · JPL
639117	2016 RZ_{30}	—	September 5, 2000	Kitt Peak	Spacewatch	·	960 m	MPC · JPL
639118	2016 RA_{37}	—	February 9, 2005	Kitt Peak	Spacewatch	·	1.8 km	MPC · JPL
639119	2016 RG_{37}	—	September 10, 2016	Mount Lemmon	Mount Lemmon Survey	·	690 m	MPC · JPL
639120	2016 RY_{41}	—	September 3, 2008	Kitt Peak	Spacewatch	·	740 m	MPC · JPL
639121	2016 RC_{46}	—	September 20, 2007	Catalina	CSS	·	1.8 km	MPC · JPL
639122	2016 RH_{60}	—	September 13, 2016	Mount Lemmon	Mount Lemmon Survey	·	820 m	MPC · JPL
639123	2016 RV_{64}	—	September 3, 2016	Mount Lemmon	Mount Lemmon Survey	·	1.5 km	MPC · JPL
639124	2016 SL_{9}	—	March 1, 2012	Mount Lemmon	Mount Lemmon Survey	·	720 m	MPC · JPL
639125	2016 SE_{11}	—	March 1, 2011	Mount Lemmon	Mount Lemmon Survey	·	630 m	MPC · JPL
639126	2016 SY_{12}	—	June 19, 2009	Mount Lemmon	Mount Lemmon Survey	·	640 m	MPC · JPL
639127	2016 SC_{13}	—	May 26, 2015	Haleakala	Pan-STARRS 1	·	4.0 km	MPC · JPL
639128	2016 SG_{27}	—	September 30, 1995	Kitt Peak	Spacewatch	·	680 m	MPC · JPL
639129	2016 SX_{27}	—	February 26, 2007	Mount Lemmon	Mount Lemmon Survey	·	1.4 km	MPC · JPL
639130	2016 SE_{29}	—	January 24, 2007	Mount Lemmon	Mount Lemmon Survey	·	1.1 km	MPC · JPL
639131	2016 SY_{29}	—	August 31, 2005	Palomar	NEAT	·	1.0 km	MPC · JPL
639132	2016 SX_{30}	—	February 9, 2008	Mount Lemmon	Mount Lemmon Survey	·	2.1 km	MPC · JPL
639133	2016 SD_{36}	—	April 2, 2005	Kitt Peak	Spacewatch	·	810 m	MPC · JPL
639134	2016 SP_{36}	—	November 21, 1995	Kitt Peak	Spacewatch	·	640 m	MPC · JPL
639135	2016 SU_{43}	—	August 28, 2005	Siding Spring	SSS	MAS	710 m	MPC · JPL
639136	2016 SP_{46}	—	May 10, 2011	Mount Lemmon	Mount Lemmon Survey	·	1.8 km	MPC · JPL
639137	2016 SM_{52}	—	September 27, 2009	Kitt Peak	Spacewatch	·	680 m	MPC · JPL
639138	2016 SL_{76}	—	September 22, 2016	Mount Lemmon	Mount Lemmon Survey	·	2.7 km	MPC · JPL
639139	2016 SO_{81}	—	September 26, 2016	Haleakala	Pan-STARRS 1	·	540 m	MPC · JPL
639140	2016 TE	—	July 24, 2003	Palomar	NEAT	·	790 m	MPC · JPL
639141	2016 TV_{5}	—	February 16, 2015	Haleakala	Pan-STARRS 1	·	870 m	MPC · JPL
639142	2016 TS_{8}	—	April 26, 2011	Mount Lemmon	Mount Lemmon Survey	·	1.1 km	MPC · JPL
639143	2016 TG_{15}	—	March 16, 2015	Kitt Peak	Spacewatch	·	960 m	MPC · JPL
639144	2016 TS_{16}	—	November 5, 2007	XuYi	PMO NEO Survey Program	·	2.0 km	MPC · JPL
639145	2016 TJ_{20}	—	December 13, 2013	Mount Lemmon	Mount Lemmon Survey	·	650 m	MPC · JPL
639146	2016 TE_{21}	—	September 14, 2005	Kitt Peak	Spacewatch	VER	2.7 km	MPC · JPL
639147	2016 TN_{21}	—	August 24, 2016	XuYi	PMO NEO Survey Program	·	850 m	MPC · JPL
639148	2016 TY_{26}	—	December 5, 2010	Piszkés-tető	K. Sárneczky, Z. Kuli	PHO	1.2 km	MPC · JPL
639149	2016 TS_{29}	—	July 28, 2003	Palomar	NEAT	MAR	1.4 km	MPC · JPL
639150	2016 TQ_{48}	—	September 23, 2011	Haleakala	Pan-STARRS 1	AGN	1.2 km	MPC · JPL
639151	2016 TR_{49}	—	June 22, 2000	Kitt Peak	Spacewatch	·	1.3 km	MPC · JPL
639152	2016 TO_{76}	—	December 22, 2004	Catalina	CSS	·	2.5 km	MPC · JPL
639153	2016 TN_{85}	—	November 15, 1995	Kitt Peak	Spacewatch	·	720 m	MPC · JPL
639154	2016 TR_{87}	—	October 15, 2002	Palomar	NEAT	·	800 m	MPC · JPL
639155	2016 TJ_{88}	—	March 20, 1999	Apache Point	SDSS Collaboration	·	3.9 km	MPC · JPL
639156	2016 TP_{94}	—	April 22, 2009	Kitt Peak	Spacewatch	·	750 m	MPC · JPL
639157	2016 TJ_{97}	—	October 22, 2009	Mount Lemmon	Mount Lemmon Survey	·	910 m	MPC · JPL
639158	2016 TH_{163}	—	October 2, 2016	Haleakala	Pan-STARRS 1	·	1.0 km	MPC · JPL
639159	2016 UQ	—	October 18, 2009	Mount Lemmon	Mount Lemmon Survey	V	570 m	MPC · JPL
639160	2016 UR_{15}	—	December 8, 2012	Mount Lemmon	Mount Lemmon Survey	·	1.1 km	MPC · JPL
639161	2016 UP_{17}	—	September 30, 2005	Mount Lemmon	Mount Lemmon Survey	·	980 m	MPC · JPL
639162	2016 UZ_{27}	—	September 17, 2006	Kitt Peak	Spacewatch	·	1.7 km	MPC · JPL
639163	2016 UC_{30}	—	August 6, 2005	Palomar	NEAT	NYS	1.0 km	MPC · JPL
639164	2016 UV_{35}	—	November 24, 2009	Kitt Peak	Spacewatch	·	1.1 km	MPC · JPL
639165	2016 UT_{41}	—	October 30, 2005	Mount Lemmon	Mount Lemmon Survey	·	1.1 km	MPC · JPL
639166	2016 US_{43}	—	May 24, 2006	Kitt Peak	Spacewatch	·	1.6 km	MPC · JPL
639167	2016 UF_{47}	—	January 27, 2007	Mount Lemmon	Mount Lemmon Survey	·	820 m	MPC · JPL
639168	2016 UX_{47}	—	July 8, 2005	Kitt Peak	Spacewatch	V	750 m	MPC · JPL
639169	2016 UA_{54}	—	October 15, 2001	Palomar	NEAT	·	1.9 km	MPC · JPL
639170	2016 UV_{54}	—	December 3, 2005	Mauna Kea	A. Boattini	·	1.2 km	MPC · JPL
639171	2016 UV_{55}	—	September 19, 2009	Mount Lemmon	Mount Lemmon Survey	·	760 m	MPC · JPL
639172	2016 UZ_{55}	—	April 4, 2003	Kitt Peak	Spacewatch	·	1.6 km	MPC · JPL
639173	2016 UT_{62}	—	May 17, 2009	Mount Lemmon	Mount Lemmon Survey	·	2.1 km	MPC · JPL
639174	2016 UB_{63}	—	November 24, 2002	Palomar	NEAT	V	600 m	MPC · JPL
639175	2016 UO_{63}	—	August 17, 2016	Haleakala	Pan-STARRS 1	V	650 m	MPC · JPL
639176	2016 UX_{66}	—	July 26, 1995	Kitt Peak	Spacewatch	RAF	870 m	MPC · JPL
639177	2016 UH_{67}	—	November 3, 2005	Catalina	CSS	·	1.2 km	MPC · JPL
639178	2016 UU_{67}	—	May 10, 2015	Mount Lemmon	Mount Lemmon Survey	·	1.2 km	MPC · JPL
639179	2016 UH_{68}	—	November 5, 2005	Kitt Peak	Spacewatch	·	870 m	MPC · JPL
639180	2016 UU_{77}	—	November 5, 2002	La Palma	A. Fitzsimmons	AST	1.7 km	MPC · JPL
639181	2016 UQ_{78}	—	May 1, 2000	Kitt Peak	Spacewatch	NYS	1.1 km	MPC · JPL
639182	2016 UO_{85}	—	January 19, 2004	Kitt Peak	Spacewatch	·	1.8 km	MPC · JPL
639183	2016 US_{86}	—	December 17, 2009	Kitt Peak	Spacewatch	NYS	1.0 km	MPC · JPL
639184	2016 UH_{88}	—	February 16, 2004	Kitt Peak	Spacewatch	·	980 m	MPC · JPL
639185	2016 UK_{91}	—	April 12, 2005	Kitt Peak	Deep Ecliptic Survey	·	1.3 km	MPC · JPL
639186	2016 UY_{91}	—	May 16, 2004	Kitt Peak	Spacewatch	·	910 m	MPC · JPL
639187	2016 UV_{98}	—	September 12, 2001	Kitt Peak	Deep Ecliptic Survey	KOR	1.2 km	MPC · JPL
639188	2016 UA_{99}	—	December 1, 2002	Mauna Kea	K. J. Meech, Pittichová, J.	·	630 m	MPC · JPL
639189	2016 UU_{101}	—	December 18, 2009	Kitt Peak	Spacewatch	·	860 m	MPC · JPL
639190	2016 UD_{115}	—	April 19, 2007	Mount Lemmon	Mount Lemmon Survey	·	1.2 km	MPC · JPL
639191	2016 UX_{118}	—	December 21, 2006	Kitt Peak	Spacewatch	·	680 m	MPC · JPL
639192	2016 UU_{122}	—	April 5, 2003	Kitt Peak	Spacewatch	·	1.2 km	MPC · JPL
639193	2016 UD_{125}	—	October 22, 2016	Kitt Peak	Spacewatch	·	840 m	MPC · JPL
639194	2016 UJ_{132}	—	February 12, 2008	Mount Lemmon	Mount Lemmon Survey	·	630 m	MPC · JPL
639195	2016 UY_{133}	—	December 31, 2013	Haleakala	Pan-STARRS 1	·	1.1 km	MPC · JPL
639196	2016 UG_{148}	—	October 21, 2006	Lulin	LUSS	·	1.8 km	MPC · JPL
639197	2016 UE_{171}	—	February 6, 2007	Mount Lemmon	Mount Lemmon Survey	·	2.1 km	MPC · JPL
639198	2016 UR_{247}	—	October 26, 2016	Mount Lemmon	Mount Lemmon Survey	·	800 m	MPC · JPL
639199	2016 UM_{251}	—	September 26, 2012	Mount Lemmon	Mount Lemmon Survey	V	610 m	MPC · JPL
639200	2016 VM_{9}	—	July 30, 2005	Palomar	NEAT	·	880 m	MPC · JPL

== 639201–639300 ==
back to top

Designation			Discovery			Properties		Ref
Permanent	Provisional	Named after	Date	Site	Discoverer(s)	Category	Diam.	Ref
639201	2016 VV_{10}	—	April 23, 2015	Haleakala	Pan-STARRS 1	·	830 m	MPC · JPL
639202	2016 VG_{19}	—	May 7, 2014	Haleakala	Pan-STARRS 1	·	1.4 km	MPC · JPL
639203	2016 VH_{19}	—	September 10, 2008	Kitt Peak	Spacewatch	·	1.1 km	MPC · JPL
639204	2016 VV_{28}	—	September 22, 2003	Kitt Peak	Spacewatch	·	1.4 km	MPC · JPL
639205	2016 VH_{34}	—	March 6, 2011	Catalina	CSS	·	890 m	MPC · JPL
639206	2016 WM_{2}	—	May 23, 2004	Socorro	LINEAR	·	3.4 km	MPC · JPL
639207	2016 WW_{12}	—	July 3, 2005	Palomar	NEAT	·	1.1 km	MPC · JPL
639208	2016 WD_{15}	—	October 12, 1991	Palomar	Lowe, A.	·	1.2 km	MPC · JPL
639209	2016 WY_{20}	—	July 26, 2005	Palomar	NEAT	·	910 m	MPC · JPL
639210	2016 WC_{21}	—	November 27, 2006	Kitt Peak	Spacewatch	·	620 m	MPC · JPL
639211	2016 WP_{26}	—	August 13, 2010	Kitt Peak	Spacewatch	EOS	1.6 km	MPC · JPL
639212	2016 WZ_{32}	—	August 30, 2005	Kitt Peak	Spacewatch	·	800 m	MPC · JPL
639213	2016 WK_{35}	—	March 25, 2006	Palomar	NEAT	·	1.7 km	MPC · JPL
639214	2016 WA_{36}	—	November 3, 2007	Kitt Peak	Spacewatch	·	2.4 km	MPC · JPL
639215	2016 WN_{39}	—	May 14, 2015	Cerro Paranal	Altmann, M., Prusti, T.	·	890 m	MPC · JPL
639216	2016 WX_{40}	—	February 14, 2009	Kitt Peak	Spacewatch	·	1.2 km	MPC · JPL
639217	2016 WQ_{44}	—	October 15, 2007	Kitt Peak	Spacewatch	·	1.4 km	MPC · JPL
639218	2016 WW_{46}	—	December 7, 2005	Kitt Peak	Spacewatch	V	620 m	MPC · JPL
639219	2016 WW_{53}	—	September 22, 2003	Palomar	NEAT	·	1.7 km	MPC · JPL
639220	2016 WD_{54}	—	August 27, 2005	Palomar	NEAT	·	1.2 km	MPC · JPL
639221	2016 WG_{58}	—	September 26, 2011	Haleakala	Pan-STARRS 1	·	1.6 km	MPC · JPL
639222	2016 XC_{3}	—	August 26, 2003	Cerro Tololo	Deep Ecliptic Survey	·	1.3 km	MPC · JPL
639223	2016 XP_{3}	—	April 2, 2011	Kitt Peak	Spacewatch	V	630 m	MPC · JPL
639224	2016 XY_{3}	—	December 3, 2002	Palomar	NEAT	·	680 m	MPC · JPL
639225	2016 XB_{7}	—	November 24, 2012	Nogales	M. Schwartz, P. R. Holvorcem	·	2.3 km	MPC · JPL
639226	2016 XH_{11}	—	October 6, 2012	Haleakala	Pan-STARRS 1	·	1.1 km	MPC · JPL
639227	2016 XY_{11}	—	May 20, 2014	Haleakala	Pan-STARRS 1	·	1.8 km	MPC · JPL
639228	2016 XM_{14}	—	September 30, 2005	Palomar	NEAT	·	920 m	MPC · JPL
639229	2016 XQ_{14}	—	November 3, 2010	Mount Lemmon	Mount Lemmon Survey	VER	3.1 km	MPC · JPL
639230	2016 XF_{16}	—	July 16, 2004	Cerro Tololo	Deep Ecliptic Survey	·	3.4 km	MPC · JPL
639231	2016 YA_{10}	—	March 28, 2003	Kitt Peak	Spacewatch	·	2.5 km	MPC · JPL
639232	2016 YP_{11}	—	October 21, 1995	Kitt Peak	Spacewatch	·	1.5 km	MPC · JPL
639233	2016 YD_{12}	—	January 16, 2000	Kitt Peak	Spacewatch	H	510 m	MPC · JPL
639234	2017 AM	—	January 2, 2017	Haleakala	Pan-STARRS 1	L5	7.6 km	MPC · JPL
639235	2017 AJ_{1}	—	September 24, 2000	Socorro	LINEAR	·	1.5 km	MPC · JPL
639236	2017 AA_{2}	—	March 30, 2005	Catalina	CSS	·	1.5 km	MPC · JPL
639237	2017 AV_{5}	—	March 4, 2005	Mount Lemmon	Mount Lemmon Survey	·	1.1 km	MPC · JPL
639238	2017 AF_{9}	—	September 11, 2007	Kitt Peak	Spacewatch	·	1.2 km	MPC · JPL
639239	2017 AA_{11}	—	October 22, 2009	Mount Lemmon	Mount Lemmon Survey	EOS	2.2 km	MPC · JPL
639240	2017 AX_{11}	—	October 31, 2005	Mount Lemmon	Mount Lemmon Survey	KOR	1.3 km	MPC · JPL
639241	2017 AE_{14}	—	November 4, 2004	Catalina	CSS	·	1.5 km	MPC · JPL
639242	2017 AZ_{16}	—	August 20, 2014	Haleakala	Pan-STARRS 1	·	3.1 km	MPC · JPL
639243	2017 AK_{17}	—	January 24, 2001	Kitt Peak	Spacewatch	·	910 m	MPC · JPL
639244	2017 AZ_{19}	—	May 6, 2010	Mount Lemmon	Mount Lemmon Survey	·	830 m	MPC · JPL
639245	2017 AR_{21}	—	July 25, 2014	Haleakala	Pan-STARRS 1	·	1.6 km	MPC · JPL
639246	2017 AX_{21}	—	April 7, 2008	Mount Lemmon	Mount Lemmon Survey	·	2.0 km	MPC · JPL
639247	2017 AE_{22}	—	February 27, 2012	Haleakala	Pan-STARRS 1	TEL	1.4 km	MPC · JPL
639248	2017 AF_{22}	—	January 23, 2006	Kitt Peak	Spacewatch	·	2.3 km	MPC · JPL
639249	2017 AH_{24}	—	August 20, 2003	Palomar	NEAT	·	2.9 km	MPC · JPL
639250	2017 AC_{47}	—	January 8, 2017	Mount Lemmon	Mount Lemmon Survey	L5	7.7 km	MPC · JPL
639251	2017 BW_{3}	—	February 16, 2010	Mount Lemmon	Mount Lemmon Survey	·	1.2 km	MPC · JPL
639252	2017 BC_{4}	—	November 8, 2008	Kitt Peak	Spacewatch	·	1.2 km	MPC · JPL
639253	2017 BT_{9}	—	January 11, 2008	Kitt Peak	Spacewatch	·	1.6 km	MPC · JPL
639254	2017 BP_{10}	—	July 4, 2005	Mount Lemmon	Mount Lemmon Survey	·	3.0 km	MPC · JPL
639255	2017 BS_{13}	—	December 25, 2005	Kitt Peak	Spacewatch	·	2.4 km	MPC · JPL
639256	2017 BU_{13}	—	October 3, 2006	Mount Lemmon	Mount Lemmon Survey	AGN	1.3 km	MPC · JPL
639257	2017 BS_{14}	—	October 11, 2004	Kitt Peak	Deep Ecliptic Survey	·	1.2 km	MPC · JPL
639258	2017 BH_{15}	—	January 26, 2017	Mount Lemmon	Mount Lemmon Survey	·	920 m	MPC · JPL
639259	2017 BZ_{15}	—	September 29, 2008	Catalina	CSS	V	620 m	MPC · JPL
639260	2017 BF_{16}	—	January 16, 2009	Mount Lemmon	Mount Lemmon Survey	·	890 m	MPC · JPL
639261	2017 BL_{16}	—	December 15, 2001	Apache Point	SDSS Collaboration	NYS	940 m	MPC · JPL
639262	2017 BW_{17}	—	March 19, 2009	Mount Lemmon	Mount Lemmon Survey	·	1.2 km	MPC · JPL
639263	2017 BH_{18}	—	February 3, 2008	Kitt Peak	Spacewatch	·	1.9 km	MPC · JPL
639264	2017 BV_{18}	—	October 18, 2006	Kitt Peak	Spacewatch	·	1.6 km	MPC · JPL
639265	2017 BH_{20}	—	May 25, 2006	Mauna Kea	P. A. Wiegert	·	1.1 km	MPC · JPL
639266	2017 BJ_{25}	—	November 29, 2005	Kitt Peak	Spacewatch	·	2.4 km	MPC · JPL
639267	2017 BP_{27}	—	October 27, 2009	Mount Lemmon	Mount Lemmon Survey	·	3.2 km	MPC · JPL
639268	2017 BD_{32}	—	May 7, 2008	Kitt Peak	Spacewatch	L5	8.5 km	MPC · JPL
639269	2017 BF_{34}	—	December 29, 2008	Catalina	CSS	·	1.8 km	MPC · JPL
639270	2017 BK_{34}	—	December 23, 2016	Haleakala	Pan-STARRS 1	·	2.1 km	MPC · JPL
639271	2017 BP_{37}	—	August 30, 2005	Palomar	NEAT	·	2.4 km	MPC · JPL
639272	2017 BW_{42}	—	January 26, 2017	Mount Lemmon	Mount Lemmon Survey	·	1.6 km	MPC · JPL
639273	2017 BX_{43}	—	September 23, 2011	Kitt Peak	Spacewatch	·	1.3 km	MPC · JPL
639274	2017 BT_{44}	—	January 28, 2000	Kitt Peak	Spacewatch	·	3.0 km	MPC · JPL
639275	2017 BW_{50}	—	January 2, 2011	Mount Lemmon	Mount Lemmon Survey	·	3.7 km	MPC · JPL
639276	2017 BX_{51}	—	January 26, 2017	Mount Lemmon	Mount Lemmon Survey	L5	7.6 km	MPC · JPL
639277	2017 BC_{52}	—	August 10, 2007	Kitt Peak	Spacewatch	·	1.4 km	MPC · JPL
639278	2017 BA_{53}	—	February 15, 2013	Tenerife	ESA OGS	·	1.6 km	MPC · JPL
639279	2017 BQ_{55}	—	August 16, 1993	Kitt Peak	Spacewatch	·	1.2 km	MPC · JPL
639280	2017 BF_{57}	—	September 30, 2005	Kitt Peak	Spacewatch	KOR	1.2 km	MPC · JPL
639281	2017 BL_{57}	—	October 5, 2015	Charleston	R. Holmes	·	2.0 km	MPC · JPL
639282	2017 BG_{58}	—	September 15, 2009	Kitt Peak	Spacewatch	·	3.1 km	MPC · JPL
639283	2017 BV_{59}	—	October 13, 2006	Kitt Peak	Spacewatch	·	1.8 km	MPC · JPL
639284	2017 BY_{60}	—	January 18, 2008	Mount Lemmon	Mount Lemmon Survey	·	1.2 km	MPC · JPL
639285	2017 BF_{61}	—	October 16, 1977	Palomar	C. J. van Houten, I. van Houten-Groeneveld, T. Gehrels	·	860 m	MPC · JPL
639286	2017 BH_{62}	—	April 10, 2010	Kitt Peak	Spacewatch	·	1.4 km	MPC · JPL
639287	2017 BB_{64}	—	December 7, 1996	Kitt Peak	Spacewatch	·	1.3 km	MPC · JPL
639288	2017 BR_{65}	—	September 12, 2002	Palomar	NEAT	·	1.4 km	MPC · JPL
639289	2017 BV_{66}	—	April 4, 2000	Anderson Mesa	LONEOS	·	1.7 km	MPC · JPL
639290	2017 BM_{69}	—	August 29, 2006	Kitt Peak	Spacewatch	·	2.0 km	MPC · JPL
639291	2017 BQ_{73}	—	January 20, 2009	Kitt Peak	Spacewatch	·	900 m	MPC · JPL
639292 Szabózoltán	2017 BO_{77}	Szabózoltán	August 23, 2003	Piszkéstető	K. Sárneczky, B. Sipőcz	·	3.0 km	MPC · JPL
639293	2017 BY_{77}	—	March 21, 2009	Kitt Peak	Spacewatch	·	1.2 km	MPC · JPL
639294	2017 BL_{78}	—	March 26, 2004	Kitt Peak	Spacewatch	·	1.6 km	MPC · JPL
639295	2017 BV_{78}	—	December 1, 2008	Kitt Peak	Spacewatch	·	1.0 km	MPC · JPL
639296	2017 BY_{78}	—	November 12, 2010	Mount Lemmon	Mount Lemmon Survey	·	1.4 km	MPC · JPL
639297	2017 BJ_{79}	—	October 25, 2011	Haleakala	Pan-STARRS 1	·	1.2 km	MPC · JPL
639298	2017 BF_{80}	—	April 30, 2008	Kitt Peak	Spacewatch	L5	7.7 km	MPC · JPL
639299	2017 BL_{80}	—	October 24, 2005	Mauna Kea	A. Boattini	·	3.7 km	MPC · JPL
639300	2017 BH_{82}	—	October 25, 2011	Haleakala	Pan-STARRS 1	·	1.6 km	MPC · JPL

== 639301–639400 ==
back to top

Designation			Discovery			Properties		Ref
Permanent	Provisional	Named after	Date	Site	Discoverer(s)	Category	Diam.	Ref
639301	2017 BZ_{83}	—	March 17, 2005	Catalina	CSS	·	1.1 km	MPC · JPL
639302	2017 BT_{86}	—	June 1, 2009	Mount Lemmon	Mount Lemmon Survey	EUN	970 m	MPC · JPL
639303	2017 BG_{87}	—	November 14, 2010	Mount Lemmon	Mount Lemmon Survey	TRE	2.6 km	MPC · JPL
639304	2017 BS_{87}	—	November 30, 1999	Kitt Peak	Spacewatch	·	1.5 km	MPC · JPL
639305	2017 BJ_{94}	—	July 4, 2005	Mount Lemmon	Mount Lemmon Survey	·	2.3 km	MPC · JPL
639306	2017 BP_{96}	—	November 11, 2007	Mount Lemmon	Mount Lemmon Survey	·	2.2 km	MPC · JPL
639307	2017 BL_{98}	—	October 19, 2000	McGraw-Hill	G. J. Garradd	·	1.2 km	MPC · JPL
639308	2017 BK_{101}	—	January 13, 2005	Kitt Peak	Spacewatch	·	4.1 km	MPC · JPL
639309	2017 BV_{102}	—	January 29, 2017	Mount Lemmon	Mount Lemmon Survey	·	990 m	MPC · JPL
639310	2017 BL_{105}	—	July 26, 2015	Haleakala	Pan-STARRS 1	·	930 m	MPC · JPL
639311	2017 BE_{106}	—	October 31, 2010	Piszkés-tető	K. Sárneczky, S. Kürti	EOS	1.8 km	MPC · JPL
639312	2017 BW_{107}	—	December 5, 2007	Mount Lemmon	Mount Lemmon Survey	(5)	1.5 km	MPC · JPL
639313	2017 BZ_{107}	—	December 13, 2006	Kitt Peak	Spacewatch	·	2.7 km	MPC · JPL
639314	2017 BU_{109}	—	October 9, 2012	Haleakala	Pan-STARRS 1	L5	8.1 km	MPC · JPL
639315	2017 BR_{117}	—	October 7, 2004	Kitt Peak	Spacewatch	·	2.7 km	MPC · JPL
639316	2017 BB_{119}	—	January 30, 2017	Mount Lemmon	Mount Lemmon Survey	·	1.9 km	MPC · JPL
639317	2017 BO_{120}	—	June 25, 2011	Mount Lemmon	Mount Lemmon Survey	L5	8.7 km	MPC · JPL
639318	2017 BR_{121}	—	March 12, 2013	Mount Lemmon	Mount Lemmon Survey	·	1.1 km	MPC · JPL
639319	2017 BB_{123}	—	November 11, 2006	Mount Lemmon	Mount Lemmon Survey	AEO	1.0 km	MPC · JPL
639320	2017 BX_{124}	—	March 21, 2012	Catalina	CSS	·	2.9 km	MPC · JPL
639321	2017 BM_{127}	—	June 17, 2009	Kitt Peak	Spacewatch	·	2.2 km	MPC · JPL
639322	2017 BT_{127}	—	November 29, 2011	Mount Lemmon	Mount Lemmon Survey	·	1.8 km	MPC · JPL
639323	2017 BG_{128}	—	October 20, 2008	Mount Lemmon	Mount Lemmon Survey	NYS	1.1 km	MPC · JPL
639324	2017 BH_{128}	—	October 27, 2003	Kitt Peak	Spacewatch	MAR	920 m	MPC · JPL
639325	2017 BT_{131}	—	October 24, 2011	Kitt Peak	Spacewatch	·	1.4 km	MPC · JPL
639326	2017 BN_{136}	—	November 1, 2005	Kitt Peak	Spacewatch	·	2.9 km	MPC · JPL
639327	2017 BZ_{137}	—	March 7, 2003	Kitt Peak	Spacewatch	GEF	1.2 km	MPC · JPL
639328	2017 BA_{138}	—	December 18, 2004	Mount Lemmon	Mount Lemmon Survey	·	3.2 km	MPC · JPL
639329	2017 BS_{138}	—	April 13, 2013	Kitt Peak	Spacewatch	·	1.6 km	MPC · JPL
639330	2017 BD_{139}	—	February 4, 2006	Kitt Peak	Spacewatch	·	2.5 km	MPC · JPL
639331	2017 BG_{141}	—	May 21, 2004	Kitt Peak	Spacewatch	EUN	1.2 km	MPC · JPL
639332	2017 BR_{144}	—	September 22, 2012	Mount Lemmon	Mount Lemmon Survey	L5	7.1 km	MPC · JPL
639333	2017 BE_{148}	—	March 11, 2005	Mount Lemmon	Mount Lemmon Survey	(5)	1.1 km	MPC · JPL
639334	2017 BT_{156}	—	January 29, 2017	Haleakala	Pan-STARRS 1	·	1.3 km	MPC · JPL
639335	2017 BF_{159}	—	January 20, 2017	Haleakala	Pan-STARRS 1	L5	6.8 km	MPC · JPL
639336	2017 BR_{160}	—	April 14, 2008	Mount Lemmon	Mount Lemmon Survey	L5	7.3 km	MPC · JPL
639337	2017 BL_{165}	—	January 29, 2017	Haleakala	Pan-STARRS 1	·	1.0 km	MPC · JPL
639338	2017 BF_{179}	—	January 30, 2017	Haleakala	Pan-STARRS 1	·	850 m	MPC · JPL
639339	2017 BE_{181}	—	April 25, 2020	Mount Lemmon	Mount Lemmon Survey	L5	6.0 km	MPC · JPL
639340	2017 CN_{2}	—	October 23, 2011	Haleakala	Pan-STARRS 1	·	1.5 km	MPC · JPL
639341	2017 CT_{2}	—	January 5, 1994	Kitt Peak	Spacewatch	·	2.2 km	MPC · JPL
639342	2017 CU_{2}	—	December 31, 1999	Kitt Peak	Spacewatch	·	3.6 km	MPC · JPL
639343	2017 CJ_{7}	—	February 13, 2013	Haleakala	Pan-STARRS 1	(5)	1.0 km	MPC · JPL
639344	2017 CJ_{9}	—	March 3, 2009	Kitt Peak	Spacewatch	·	1.0 km	MPC · JPL
639345	2017 CF_{11}	—	November 26, 2009	Mount Lemmon	Mount Lemmon Survey	·	3.1 km	MPC · JPL
639346	2017 CB_{13}	—	July 15, 2008	Siding Spring	SSS	·	1.7 km	MPC · JPL
639347	2017 CE_{13}	—	October 26, 2011	Haleakala	Pan-STARRS 1	·	1.7 km	MPC · JPL
639348	2017 CW_{14}	—	February 23, 2007	Mount Lemmon	Mount Lemmon Survey	·	1.6 km	MPC · JPL
639349	2017 CV_{16}	—	January 29, 2003	Kitt Peak	Spacewatch	·	2.1 km	MPC · JPL
639350	2017 CY_{19}	—	January 30, 2004	Kitt Peak	Spacewatch	·	1.7 km	MPC · JPL
639351	2017 CA_{22}	—	February 16, 2012	Haleakala	Pan-STARRS 1	·	1.5 km	MPC · JPL
639352	2017 CK_{22}	—	January 16, 2013	Haleakala	Pan-STARRS 1	NYS	1.2 km	MPC · JPL
639353	2017 CP_{22}	—	August 14, 2012	Kitt Peak	Spacewatch	L5	8.8 km	MPC · JPL
639354	2017 CK_{23}	—	May 29, 2003	Kitt Peak	Spacewatch	KOR	1.5 km	MPC · JPL
639355	2017 CZ_{23}	—	November 12, 2005	Kitt Peak	Spacewatch	KOR	1.4 km	MPC · JPL
639356	2017 CO_{24}	—	December 5, 2010	Mount Lemmon	Mount Lemmon Survey	·	3.4 km	MPC · JPL
639357	2017 CP_{24}	—	September 28, 2011	Kitt Peak	Spacewatch	(5)	880 m	MPC · JPL
639358	2017 CK_{25}	—	February 3, 2017	Mount Lemmon	Mount Lemmon Survey	·	1.4 km	MPC · JPL
639359	2017 CQ_{28}	—	February 13, 2013	Haleakala	Pan-STARRS 1	·	1.2 km	MPC · JPL
639360	2017 CL_{29}	—	December 3, 2010	Kitt Peak	Spacewatch	LIX	3.7 km	MPC · JPL
639361	2017 CP_{30}	—	October 8, 2008	Mount Lemmon	Mount Lemmon Survey	·	3.8 km	MPC · JPL
639362	2017 CY_{30}	—	August 25, 2005	Palomar	NEAT	KOR	1.5 km	MPC · JPL
639363	2017 CJ_{31}	—	December 31, 2011	Piszkés-tető	K. Sárneczky, S. Kürti	·	2.6 km	MPC · JPL
639364	2017 CJ_{33}	—	February 11, 2008	Kitt Peak	Spacewatch	·	1.8 km	MPC · JPL
639365	2017 CZ_{33}	—	April 2, 2009	Mount Lemmon	Mount Lemmon Survey	EUN	1.1 km	MPC · JPL
639366	2017 CD_{34}	—	January 23, 2006	Catalina	CSS	EOS	2.2 km	MPC · JPL
639367	2017 CL_{34}	—	June 29, 2014	Haleakala	Pan-STARRS 1	·	1.4 km	MPC · JPL
639368	2017 CY_{34}	—	May 3, 2008	Kitt Peak	Spacewatch	·	2.2 km	MPC · JPL
639369	2017 CE_{35}	—	October 21, 2006	Kitt Peak	Spacewatch	·	1.9 km	MPC · JPL
639370	2017 CT_{35}	—	March 24, 2006	Kitt Peak	Spacewatch	·	2.2 km	MPC · JPL
639371	2017 DN_{1}	—	February 14, 2000	Kitt Peak	Spacewatch	·	1.3 km	MPC · JPL
639372	2017 DX_{1}	—	September 19, 2006	Catalina	CSS	·	1.5 km	MPC · JPL
639373	2017 DG_{2}	—	October 6, 2007	Kitt Peak	Spacewatch	·	1.2 km	MPC · JPL
639374	2017 DM_{5}	—	March 13, 2013	Palomar	Palomar Transient Factory	·	1.6 km	MPC · JPL
639375	2017 DM_{9}	—	April 12, 2000	Kitt Peak	Spacewatch	·	1.4 km	MPC · JPL
639376	2017 DA_{11}	—	January 27, 2017	Haleakala	Pan-STARRS 1	·	2.1 km	MPC · JPL
639377	2017 DD_{12}	—	November 18, 2011	Mount Lemmon	Mount Lemmon Survey	·	1.6 km	MPC · JPL
639378	2017 DZ_{14}	—	February 3, 2008	Catalina	CSS	·	2.4 km	MPC · JPL
639379	2017 DN_{15}	—	January 23, 2006	Kitt Peak	Spacewatch	H	590 m	MPC · JPL
639380	2017 DV_{18}	—	January 25, 2009	Kitt Peak	Spacewatch	·	940 m	MPC · JPL
639381	2017 DW_{18}	—	October 20, 1995	Kitt Peak	Spacewatch	KOR	1.3 km	MPC · JPL
639382	2017 DZ_{19}	—	September 29, 2005	Kitt Peak	Spacewatch	KOR	1.1 km	MPC · JPL
639383	2017 DL_{20}	—	August 4, 2003	Kitt Peak	Spacewatch	·	2.1 km	MPC · JPL
639384	2017 DT_{21}	—	December 31, 2007	Mount Lemmon	Mount Lemmon Survey	·	1.3 km	MPC · JPL
639385	2017 DF_{23}	—	January 27, 2017	Haleakala	Pan-STARRS 1	L5	6.4 km	MPC · JPL
639386	2017 DE_{25}	—	August 29, 2006	Kitt Peak	Spacewatch	·	1.2 km	MPC · JPL
639387	2017 DJ_{25}	—	October 7, 2005	Mauna Kea	A. Boattini	·	2.7 km	MPC · JPL
639388	2017 DJ_{26}	—	January 23, 2006	Mount Lemmon	Mount Lemmon Survey	·	2.5 km	MPC · JPL
639389	2017 DG_{30}	—	October 25, 2011	Haleakala	Pan-STARRS 1	·	1.4 km	MPC · JPL
639390	2017 DS_{30}	—	July 21, 2006	Catalina	CSS	EUN	990 m	MPC · JPL
639391	2017 DE_{31}	—	October 2, 2006	Mount Lemmon	Mount Lemmon Survey	·	1.7 km	MPC · JPL
639392	2017 DV_{31}	—	October 19, 2006	Kitt Peak	Spacewatch	·	1.8 km	MPC · JPL
639393	2017 DW_{31}	—	May 9, 2014	Haleakala	Pan-STARRS 1	·	1.1 km	MPC · JPL
639394	2017 DX_{31}	—	October 7, 2004	Kitt Peak	Spacewatch	·	3.0 km	MPC · JPL
639395	2017 DJ_{32}	—	January 12, 2000	Kitt Peak	Spacewatch	·	3.3 km	MPC · JPL
639396	2017 DV_{33}	—	October 18, 2006	Kitt Peak	Spacewatch	AGN	1.0 km	MPC · JPL
639397	2017 DF_{37}	—	April 30, 2008	Mount Lemmon	Mount Lemmon Survey	L5	10 km	MPC · JPL
639398	2017 DK_{38}	—	May 31, 2006	Mount Lemmon	Mount Lemmon Survey	·	1.7 km	MPC · JPL
639399	2017 DA_{39}	—	November 17, 2009	Kitt Peak	Spacewatch	·	650 m	MPC · JPL
639400	2017 DC_{41}	—	September 24, 2011	Haleakala	Pan-STARRS 1	·	1.1 km	MPC · JPL

== 639401–639500 ==
back to top

Designation			Discovery			Properties		Ref
Permanent	Provisional	Named after	Date	Site	Discoverer(s)	Category	Diam.	Ref
639401	2017 DM_{43}	—	April 14, 2007	Mount Lemmon	Mount Lemmon Survey	·	2.2 km	MPC · JPL
639402	2017 DT_{43}	—	November 2, 2002	La Palma	A. Fitzsimmons	·	1.3 km	MPC · JPL
639403	2017 DM_{47}	—	March 26, 2004	Kitt Peak	Spacewatch	·	1.4 km	MPC · JPL
639404	2017 DF_{51}	—	June 7, 2008	Kitt Peak	Spacewatch	·	1.9 km	MPC · JPL
639405	2017 DZ_{51}	—	April 8, 2008	Kitt Peak	Spacewatch	·	1.9 km	MPC · JPL
639406	2017 DG_{52}	—	March 10, 1999	Kitt Peak	Spacewatch	AGN	1.1 km	MPC · JPL
639407	2017 DL_{52}	—	November 18, 2007	Mount Lemmon	Mount Lemmon Survey	·	1.1 km	MPC · JPL
639408	2017 DR_{53}	—	September 16, 2009	Kitt Peak	Spacewatch	·	2.2 km	MPC · JPL
639409	2017 DS_{53}	—	April 18, 2009	Mount Lemmon	Mount Lemmon Survey	·	1.4 km	MPC · JPL
639410	2017 DD_{54}	—	December 25, 2005	Mount Lemmon	Mount Lemmon Survey	·	2.2 km	MPC · JPL
639411	2017 DG_{56}	—	August 4, 2008	Siding Spring	SSS	·	3.3 km	MPC · JPL
639412	2017 DP_{61}	—	August 22, 2014	Haleakala	Pan-STARRS 1	ADE	1.8 km	MPC · JPL
639413	2017 DR_{63}	—	March 13, 2013	Catalina	CSS	·	1.7 km	MPC · JPL
639414	2017 DY_{65}	—	March 13, 2013	Mount Lemmon	Mount Lemmon Survey	·	790 m	MPC · JPL
639415	2017 DM_{67}	—	March 31, 2012	Mount Lemmon	Mount Lemmon Survey	THM	1.9 km	MPC · JPL
639416	2017 DB_{73}	—	April 28, 2008	Mount Lemmon	Mount Lemmon Survey	·	2.0 km	MPC · JPL
639417	2017 DH_{73}	—	July 24, 2003	Palomar	NEAT	EOS	2.0 km	MPC · JPL
639418	2017 DC_{74}	—	September 10, 2010	Kitt Peak	Spacewatch	·	1.7 km	MPC · JPL
639419	2017 DF_{74}	—	October 13, 2005	Kitt Peak	Spacewatch	·	1.7 km	MPC · JPL
639420	2017 DB_{76}	—	April 3, 2002	Kitt Peak	Spacewatch	·	2.0 km	MPC · JPL
639421	2017 DP_{76}	—	February 10, 2011	Mount Lemmon	Mount Lemmon Survey	·	3.2 km	MPC · JPL
639422	2017 DY_{77}	—	July 29, 2008	Mount Lemmon	Mount Lemmon Survey	·	710 m	MPC · JPL
639423	2017 DB_{78}	—	January 19, 2004	Kitt Peak	Spacewatch	·	1.6 km	MPC · JPL
639424	2017 DL_{78}	—	October 5, 2004	Kitt Peak	Spacewatch	·	2.2 km	MPC · JPL
639425	2017 DP_{78}	—	March 15, 2001	Kitt Peak	Spacewatch	·	2.5 km	MPC · JPL
639426	2017 DQ_{79}	—	February 14, 2004	Kitt Peak	Spacewatch	EUN	1.2 km	MPC · JPL
639427	2017 DM_{80}	—	December 28, 1999	Eskridge	G. Bell, G. Hug	·	2.7 km	MPC · JPL
639428	2017 DN_{80}	—	May 16, 2009	Kitt Peak	Spacewatch	EUN	1.1 km	MPC · JPL
639429	2017 DB_{82}	—	September 15, 2004	Anderson Mesa	LONEOS	·	2.5 km	MPC · JPL
639430	2017 DZ_{82}	—	December 31, 2007	Mount Lemmon	Mount Lemmon Survey	·	1.7 km	MPC · JPL
639431	2017 DD_{83}	—	February 2, 2006	Kitt Peak	Spacewatch	·	2.8 km	MPC · JPL
639432	2017 DG_{83}	—	September 2, 2010	Mount Lemmon	Mount Lemmon Survey	·	1.3 km	MPC · JPL
639433	2017 DV_{83}	—	January 13, 2008	Mount Lemmon	Mount Lemmon Survey	·	1.6 km	MPC · JPL
639434	2017 DU_{84}	—	March 24, 2006	Kitt Peak	Spacewatch	·	3.2 km	MPC · JPL
639435	2017 DN_{85}	—	September 19, 2003	Kitt Peak	Spacewatch	·	3.4 km	MPC · JPL
639436	2017 DE_{86}	—	January 7, 2006	Kitt Peak	Spacewatch	·	1.1 km	MPC · JPL
639437	2017 DG_{87}	—	January 28, 2006	Mount Lemmon	Mount Lemmon Survey	EOS	1.9 km	MPC · JPL
639438	2017 DC_{89}	—	November 13, 2010	Mount Lemmon	Mount Lemmon Survey	HOF	2.2 km	MPC · JPL
639439	2017 DD_{90}	—	August 5, 2005	Palomar	NEAT	·	1.9 km	MPC · JPL
639440	2017 DQ_{92}	—	December 10, 2004	Kitt Peak	Spacewatch	·	3.3 km	MPC · JPL
639441	2017 DM_{93}	—	August 27, 2005	Palomar	NEAT	·	2.4 km	MPC · JPL
639442	2017 DS_{95}	—	August 21, 2006	Kitt Peak	Spacewatch	(5)	1.4 km	MPC · JPL
639443	2017 DG_{98}	—	September 11, 2002	Palomar	NEAT	·	3.0 km	MPC · JPL
639444	2017 DT_{99}	—	February 13, 2008	Kitt Peak	Spacewatch	·	1.6 km	MPC · JPL
639445	2017 DW_{99}	—	November 23, 2006	Kitt Peak	Spacewatch	·	1.6 km	MPC · JPL
639446	2017 DN_{100}	—	July 29, 2008	Mount Lemmon	Mount Lemmon Survey	·	2.4 km	MPC · JPL
639447	2017 DE_{101}	—	February 13, 2012	Haleakala	Pan-STARRS 1	·	2.3 km	MPC · JPL
639448	2017 DG_{103}	—	November 25, 2005	Kitt Peak	Spacewatch	·	880 m	MPC · JPL
639449	2017 DZ_{104}	—	June 17, 2010	Mount Lemmon	Mount Lemmon Survey	·	1.5 km	MPC · JPL
639450	2017 DL_{105}	—	October 13, 2010	Mount Lemmon	Mount Lemmon Survey	·	1.9 km	MPC · JPL
639451	2017 DA_{106}	—	March 3, 2000	Kitt Peak	Spacewatch	·	1.8 km	MPC · JPL
639452	2017 DY_{106}	—	December 31, 2011	Mount Lemmon	Mount Lemmon Survey	·	2.7 km	MPC · JPL
639453	2017 DU_{107}	—	November 13, 2002	Kitt Peak	Spacewatch	·	2.3 km	MPC · JPL
639454	2017 DG_{108}	—	September 25, 2005	Kitt Peak	Spacewatch	·	2.2 km	MPC · JPL
639455	2017 DX_{109}	—	March 21, 2009	Kitt Peak	Spacewatch	·	1.4 km	MPC · JPL
639456	2017 DG_{111}	—	December 13, 1998	Kitt Peak	Spacewatch	(2076)	980 m	MPC · JPL
639457	2017 DL_{111}	—	July 31, 2014	Haleakala	Pan-STARRS 1	NAE	3.0 km	MPC · JPL
639458	2017 DQ_{111}	—	July 31, 2005	Palomar	NEAT	·	2.7 km	MPC · JPL
639459	2017 DP_{115}	—	May 26, 2007	Mount Lemmon	Mount Lemmon Survey	·	3.1 km	MPC · JPL
639460	2017 DX_{116}	—	January 18, 2008	Kitt Peak	Spacewatch	·	1.9 km	MPC · JPL
639461	2017 DA_{117}	—	December 19, 2007	Mount Lemmon	Mount Lemmon Survey	·	2.3 km	MPC · JPL
639462	2017 DO_{117}	—	October 4, 2006	Mount Lemmon	Mount Lemmon Survey	·	2.0 km	MPC · JPL
639463	2017 DB_{118}	—	January 17, 2008	Mount Lemmon	Mount Lemmon Survey	·	2.2 km	MPC · JPL
639464	2017 DC_{118}	—	June 21, 2009	Mount Lemmon	Mount Lemmon Survey	·	2.0 km	MPC · JPL
639465	2017 DN_{118}	—	April 14, 2007	Kitt Peak	Spacewatch	EMA	3.0 km	MPC · JPL
639466	2017 DO_{120}	—	February 25, 2006	Mount Lemmon	Mount Lemmon Survey	·	2.2 km	MPC · JPL
639467	2017 DH_{121}	—	August 4, 2003	Kitt Peak	Spacewatch	·	3.0 km	MPC · JPL
639468	2017 DL_{121}	—	April 13, 2013	Haleakala	Pan-STARRS 1	·	1.3 km	MPC · JPL
639469	2017 DQ_{121}	—	January 19, 2012	Haleakala	Pan-STARRS 1	·	1.7 km	MPC · JPL
639470	2017 DJ_{130}	—	February 22, 2017	Haleakala	Pan-STARRS 1	·	1.4 km	MPC · JPL
639471	2017 DB_{148}	—	August 28, 2014	Kitt Peak	Spacewatch	·	1.5 km	MPC · JPL
639472	2017 EO_{4}	—	November 1, 2015	Haleakala	Pan-STARRS 1	·	2.7 km	MPC · JPL
639473	2017 EH_{7}	—	April 16, 2004	Kitt Peak	Spacewatch	·	1.8 km	MPC · JPL
639474	2017 EQ_{7}	—	November 8, 2009	Catalina	CSS	EOS	2.0 km	MPC · JPL
639475	2017 EM_{9}	—	February 23, 2017	Mount Lemmon	Mount Lemmon Survey	ADE	1.5 km	MPC · JPL
639476	2017 EY_{9}	—	March 17, 2013	Mount Lemmon	Mount Lemmon Survey	·	1.7 km	MPC · JPL
639477	2017 EQ_{11}	—	March 30, 2008	Kitt Peak	Spacewatch	MRX	1.0 km	MPC · JPL
639478	2017 EQ_{12}	—	September 24, 2000	Socorro	LINEAR	·	2.7 km	MPC · JPL
639479	2017 EB_{14}	—	September 27, 2009	Mount Lemmon	Mount Lemmon Survey	·	3.2 km	MPC · JPL
639480	2017 EV_{16}	—	March 31, 2008	Kitt Peak	Spacewatch	HOF	2.7 km	MPC · JPL
639481	2017 EF_{17}	—	June 27, 2004	Kitt Peak	Spacewatch	·	2.0 km	MPC · JPL
639482	2017 ER_{17}	—	February 9, 2008	Mount Lemmon	Mount Lemmon Survey	·	1.5 km	MPC · JPL
639483	2017 EG_{22}	—	January 26, 2012	Mount Lemmon	Mount Lemmon Survey	·	1.8 km	MPC · JPL
639484	2017 EN_{22}	—	March 9, 2008	Kitt Peak	Spacewatch	·	1.6 km	MPC · JPL
639485	2017 EH_{23}	—	September 12, 2007	Mount Lemmon	Mount Lemmon Survey	HNS	900 m	MPC · JPL
639486	2017 EQ_{23}	—	January 16, 2011	Mount Lemmon	Mount Lemmon Survey	THM	1.9 km	MPC · JPL
639487	2017 EX_{23}	—	March 6, 2008	Mount Lemmon	Mount Lemmon Survey	·	1.6 km	MPC · JPL
639488	2017 EZ_{23}	—	November 3, 2010	Mount Lemmon	Mount Lemmon Survey	PAD	1.4 km	MPC · JPL
639489	2017 EF_{24}	—	September 28, 2003	Kitt Peak	Spacewatch	·	2.1 km	MPC · JPL
639490	2017 EC_{25}	—	October 16, 2009	Mount Lemmon	Mount Lemmon Survey	·	1.9 km	MPC · JPL
639491	2017 EM_{30}	—	March 7, 2017	Haleakala	Pan-STARRS 1	·	1.6 km	MPC · JPL
639492	2017 EZ_{30}	—	March 5, 2017	Haleakala	Pan-STARRS 1	·	860 m	MPC · JPL
639493	2017 EV_{32}	—	March 7, 2017	Haleakala	Pan-STARRS 1	·	1.5 km	MPC · JPL
639494	2017 FO_{3}	—	October 16, 2003	Kitt Peak	Spacewatch	·	3.0 km	MPC · JPL
639495	2017 FS_{3}	—	August 22, 1995	Kitt Peak	Spacewatch	BRA	1.8 km	MPC · JPL
639496	2017 FA_{4}	—	March 23, 1995	Kitt Peak	Spacewatch	·	1.4 km	MPC · JPL
639497	2017 FR_{4}	—	October 10, 2010	Kitt Peak	Spacewatch	·	1.9 km	MPC · JPL
639498	2017 FE_{5}	—	February 12, 2004	Kitt Peak	Spacewatch	·	1.5 km	MPC · JPL
639499	2017 FH_{5}	—	March 25, 2007	Mount Lemmon	Mount Lemmon Survey	EOS	1.9 km	MPC · JPL
639500	2017 FO_{6}	—	April 11, 2013	Mount Lemmon	Mount Lemmon Survey	·	1.3 km	MPC · JPL

== 639501–639600 ==
back to top

Designation			Discovery			Properties		Ref
Permanent	Provisional	Named after	Date	Site	Discoverer(s)	Category	Diam.	Ref
639501	2017 FX_{6}	—	February 8, 2008	Kitt Peak	Spacewatch	·	1.6 km	MPC · JPL
639502	2017 FG_{8}	—	March 14, 2004	Palomar	NEAT	·	1.8 km	MPC · JPL
639503	2017 FN_{8}	—	September 29, 2008	Mount Lemmon	Mount Lemmon Survey	·	3.2 km	MPC · JPL
639504	2017 FK_{10}	—	May 19, 2004	Kitt Peak	Spacewatch	·	2.5 km	MPC · JPL
639505	2017 FJ_{11}	—	April 3, 2013	Haleakala	Pan-STARRS 1	·	940 m	MPC · JPL
639506	2017 FZ_{13}	—	April 15, 1996	Kitt Peak	Spacewatch	·	2.3 km	MPC · JPL
639507	2017 FM_{15}	—	March 9, 2003	Kitt Peak	Spacewatch	AGN	1 km	MPC · JPL
639508	2017 FU_{15}	—	September 18, 2003	Kitt Peak	Spacewatch	·	2.3 km	MPC · JPL
639509	2017 FH_{16}	—	October 26, 2011	Haleakala	Pan-STARRS 1	·	980 m	MPC · JPL
639510	2017 FB_{19}	—	April 3, 2013	Mount Lemmon	Mount Lemmon Survey	·	1.2 km	MPC · JPL
639511	2017 FD_{20}	—	February 2, 2008	Mount Lemmon	Mount Lemmon Survey	·	1.1 km	MPC · JPL
639512	2017 FZ_{20}	—	February 21, 2007	Kitt Peak	Spacewatch	·	1.8 km	MPC · JPL
639513	2017 FW_{21}	—	September 25, 2008	Mount Lemmon	Mount Lemmon Survey	·	2.3 km	MPC · JPL
639514	2017 FB_{23}	—	March 5, 2006	Kitt Peak	Spacewatch	·	2.8 km	MPC · JPL
639515	2017 FN_{23}	—	April 21, 2009	Mount Lemmon	Mount Lemmon Survey	(5)	1.2 km	MPC · JPL
639516	2017 FJ_{24}	—	December 1, 2006	Mount Lemmon	Mount Lemmon Survey	·	2.3 km	MPC · JPL
639517	2017 FO_{26}	—	January 3, 2012	Kitt Peak	Spacewatch	·	1.5 km	MPC · JPL
639518	2017 FG_{28}	—	March 4, 2008	Mount Lemmon	Mount Lemmon Survey	·	2.0 km	MPC · JPL
639519	2017 FF_{30}	—	December 27, 2006	Mount Lemmon	Mount Lemmon Survey	·	2.1 km	MPC · JPL
639520	2017 FO_{30}	—	April 17, 2013	Haleakala	Pan-STARRS 1	·	1.3 km	MPC · JPL
639521	2017 FC_{31}	—	May 3, 2008	Mount Lemmon	Mount Lemmon Survey	·	2.0 km	MPC · JPL
639522	2017 FN_{31}	—	November 9, 2004	Mauna Kea	Veillet, C.	·	1.5 km	MPC · JPL
639523	2017 FZ_{31}	—	September 19, 2014	Haleakala	Pan-STARRS 1	·	1.9 km	MPC · JPL
639524	2017 FP_{32}	—	March 14, 2007	Kitt Peak	Spacewatch	·	1.8 km	MPC · JPL
639525	2017 FU_{32}	—	November 15, 2006	Kitt Peak	Spacewatch	·	1.5 km	MPC · JPL
639526	2017 FC_{33}	—	February 20, 2006	Kitt Peak	Spacewatch	·	2.7 km	MPC · JPL
639527	2017 FJ_{33}	—	July 28, 2014	Haleakala	Pan-STARRS 1	·	1.4 km	MPC · JPL
639528	2017 FK_{34}	—	January 27, 2007	Mount Lemmon	Mount Lemmon Survey	·	1.8 km	MPC · JPL
639529	2017 FL_{34}	—	February 4, 2003	La Silla	Barbieri, C.	PAD	1.4 km	MPC · JPL
639530	2017 FS_{34}	—	September 30, 2005	Mount Lemmon	Mount Lemmon Survey	·	1.8 km	MPC · JPL
639531	2017 FK_{35}	—	August 31, 2005	Kitt Peak	Spacewatch	·	1.6 km	MPC · JPL
639532	2017 FQ_{35}	—	September 19, 2006	Catalina	CSS	·	1.6 km	MPC · JPL
639533	2017 FJ_{36}	—	December 22, 2003	Kitt Peak	Spacewatch	·	2.1 km	MPC · JPL
639534	2017 FQ_{36}	—	December 28, 2011	Mount Lemmon	Mount Lemmon Survey	·	1.8 km	MPC · JPL
639535	2017 FB_{38}	—	February 5, 2011	Haleakala	Pan-STARRS 1	·	2.5 km	MPC · JPL
639536	2017 FK_{38}	—	September 3, 2005	Mauna Kea	Veillet, C.	·	1.7 km	MPC · JPL
639537	2017 FC_{40}	—	November 17, 2001	Kitt Peak	Spacewatch	AGN	1.3 km	MPC · JPL
639538	2017 FD_{40}	—	April 6, 2008	Mount Lemmon	Mount Lemmon Survey	·	2.2 km	MPC · JPL
639539	2017 FG_{40}	—	February 6, 2007	Mount Lemmon	Mount Lemmon Survey	·	2.3 km	MPC · JPL
639540	2017 FW_{40}	—	December 26, 2006	Kitt Peak	Spacewatch	·	1.8 km	MPC · JPL
639541	2017 FD_{42}	—	March 5, 2011	Mount Lemmon	Mount Lemmon Survey	·	2.9 km	MPC · JPL
639542	2017 FL_{42}	—	November 20, 2009	Mount Lemmon	Mount Lemmon Survey	·	2.8 km	MPC · JPL
639543	2017 FQ_{42}	—	April 25, 2000	Kitt Peak	Spacewatch	·	3.9 km	MPC · JPL
639544	2017 FH_{43}	—	December 24, 2006	Kitt Peak	Spacewatch	GEF	1.4 km	MPC · JPL
639545	2017 FT_{43}	—	April 24, 2003	Anderson Mesa	LONEOS	·	3.0 km	MPC · JPL
639546	2017 FT_{44}	—	January 30, 2008	Mount Lemmon	Mount Lemmon Survey	·	1.4 km	MPC · JPL
639547	2017 FE_{46}	—	October 3, 2006	Mount Lemmon	Mount Lemmon Survey	·	1.6 km	MPC · JPL
639548	2017 FV_{46}	—	February 28, 2008	Mount Lemmon	Mount Lemmon Survey	·	1.3 km	MPC · JPL
639549	2017 FE_{47}	—	May 1, 2013	Mount Lemmon	Mount Lemmon Survey	·	1.2 km	MPC · JPL
639550	2017 FT_{47}	—	October 9, 2010	Mount Lemmon	Mount Lemmon Survey	·	1.7 km	MPC · JPL
639551	2017 FU_{49}	—	April 14, 2008	Kitt Peak	Spacewatch	·	1.7 km	MPC · JPL
639552	2017 FE_{50}	—	August 31, 2000	Kitt Peak	Spacewatch	·	1.4 km	MPC · JPL
639553	2017 FG_{50}	—	May 9, 2013	Haleakala	Pan-STARRS 1	NEM	1.8 km	MPC · JPL
639554	2017 FK_{50}	—	June 1, 2013	Kitt Peak	Spacewatch	·	1.6 km	MPC · JPL
639555	2017 FC_{51}	—	July 3, 2008	Siding Spring	SSS	·	1.9 km	MPC · JPL
639556	2017 FK_{51}	—	April 28, 2008	Mount Lemmon	Mount Lemmon Survey	·	1.8 km	MPC · JPL
639557	2017 FN_{51}	—	April 18, 2013	Mount Lemmon	Mount Lemmon Survey	EUN	1.0 km	MPC · JPL
639558	2017 FY_{51}	—	October 28, 2014	Haleakala	Pan-STARRS 1	EOS	1.9 km	MPC · JPL
639559	2017 FF_{52}	—	August 23, 2014	Haleakala	Pan-STARRS 1	EUN	1.1 km	MPC · JPL
639560	2017 FN_{52}	—	December 10, 2010	Mount Lemmon	Mount Lemmon Survey	·	2.4 km	MPC · JPL
639561	2017 FC_{53}	—	February 2, 2017	Haleakala	Pan-STARRS 1	·	2.8 km	MPC · JPL
639562	2017 FD_{53}	—	October 7, 2002	Palomar	NEAT	TIR	4.7 km	MPC · JPL
639563	2017 FH_{53}	—	March 28, 2012	Catalina	CSS	·	2.4 km	MPC · JPL
639564	2017 FP_{56}	—	November 11, 2001	Apache Point	SDSS	·	4.4 km	MPC · JPL
639565	2017 FG_{57}	—	April 20, 2013	Mount Lemmon	Mount Lemmon Survey	·	1.8 km	MPC · JPL
639566	2017 FZ_{61}	—	September 2, 2014	Haleakala	Pan-STARRS 1	·	1.7 km	MPC · JPL
639567	2017 FS_{62}	—	January 19, 2012	Mount Lemmon	Mount Lemmon Survey	·	1.6 km	MPC · JPL
639568	2017 FJ_{67}	—	September 27, 2003	Apache Point	SDSS Collaboration	·	3.2 km	MPC · JPL
639569	2017 FJ_{69}	—	February 7, 2011	Mount Lemmon	Mount Lemmon Survey	·	2.5 km	MPC · JPL
639570	2017 FH_{71}	—	October 1, 2013	Mount Lemmon	Mount Lemmon Survey	H	300 m	MPC · JPL
639571	2017 FP_{71}	—	October 1, 2010	Mount Lemmon	Mount Lemmon Survey	·	2.3 km	MPC · JPL
639572	2017 FS_{74}	—	April 12, 2013	Haleakala	Pan-STARRS 1	·	1.1 km	MPC · JPL
639573	2017 FS_{77}	—	January 27, 2006	Mount Lemmon	Mount Lemmon Survey	·	1.4 km	MPC · JPL
639574	2017 FU_{77}	—	September 24, 2005	Kitt Peak	Spacewatch	·	1.9 km	MPC · JPL
639575	2017 FK_{78}	—	January 27, 2006	Mount Lemmon	Mount Lemmon Survey	·	3.2 km	MPC · JPL
639576	2017 FO_{78}	—	April 1, 2003	Apache Point	SDSS Collaboration	·	2.2 km	MPC · JPL
639577	2017 FU_{79}	—	April 21, 2009	Mount Lemmon	Mount Lemmon Survey	·	1.1 km	MPC · JPL
639578	2017 FO_{81}	—	February 27, 2006	Mount Lemmon	Mount Lemmon Survey	·	2.3 km	MPC · JPL
639579	2017 FC_{83}	—	January 17, 2007	Kitt Peak	Spacewatch	HOF	2.4 km	MPC · JPL
639580	2017 FO_{84}	—	August 27, 2014	Haleakala	Pan-STARRS 1	EOS	1.7 km	MPC · JPL
639581	2017 FP_{84}	—	October 23, 2003	Kitt Peak	Spacewatch	·	3.0 km	MPC · JPL
639582	2017 FD_{88}	—	September 16, 2009	Mount Lemmon	Mount Lemmon Survey	BRA	1.6 km	MPC · JPL
639583	2017 FA_{89}	—	May 6, 2006	Kitt Peak	Spacewatch	·	2.5 km	MPC · JPL
639584	2017 FD_{95}	—	January 8, 2006	Mount Lemmon	Mount Lemmon Survey	·	1.7 km	MPC · JPL
639585	2017 FV_{95}	—	September 12, 2004	Kitt Peak	Spacewatch	·	2.4 km	MPC · JPL
639586	2017 FL_{96}	—	April 28, 2004	Kitt Peak	Spacewatch	·	1.5 km	MPC · JPL
639587	2017 FK_{97}	—	April 13, 2008	Mount Lemmon	Mount Lemmon Survey	·	1.4 km	MPC · JPL
639588	2017 FO_{97}	—	April 7, 2003	Kitt Peak	Spacewatch	·	2.6 km	MPC · JPL
639589	2017 FU_{97}	—	March 24, 2012	Mayhill-ISON	L. Elenin	·	2.3 km	MPC · JPL
639590	2017 FH_{98}	—	September 23, 2005	Kitt Peak	Spacewatch	·	1.8 km	MPC · JPL
639591	2017 FB_{99}	—	March 16, 2007	Mount Lemmon	Mount Lemmon Survey	·	2.3 km	MPC · JPL
639592	2017 FD_{105}	—	November 30, 2005	Mount Lemmon	Mount Lemmon Survey	EOS	2.0 km	MPC · JPL
639593	2017 FG_{106}	—	February 28, 2008	Mount Lemmon	Mount Lemmon Survey	·	1.3 km	MPC · JPL
639594	2017 FY_{108}	—	February 13, 2008	Mount Lemmon	Mount Lemmon Survey	·	2.2 km	MPC · JPL
639595	2017 FJ_{110}	—	October 22, 2005	Kitt Peak	Spacewatch	HOF	2.7 km	MPC · JPL
639596	2017 FE_{111}	—	December 10, 2005	Kitt Peak	Spacewatch	·	3.3 km	MPC · JPL
639597	2017 FK_{111}	—	February 9, 1999	Kitt Peak	Spacewatch	·	1.6 km	MPC · JPL
639598	2017 FS_{111}	—	April 27, 2012	Haleakala	Pan-STARRS 1	EOS	2.1 km	MPC · JPL
639599	2017 FT_{111}	—	October 22, 2003	Kitt Peak	Spacewatch	·	2.6 km	MPC · JPL
639600	2017 FU_{111}	—	August 3, 2014	Haleakala	Pan-STARRS 1	PAD	1.3 km	MPC · JPL

== 639601–639700 ==
back to top

Designation			Discovery			Properties		Ref
Permanent	Provisional	Named after	Date	Site	Discoverer(s)	Category	Diam.	Ref
639601	2017 FJ_{115}	—	September 24, 2000	Kitt Peak	Spacewatch	·	1.7 km	MPC · JPL
639602	2017 FC_{118}	—	February 14, 2012	Haleakala	Pan-STARRS 1	·	1.4 km	MPC · JPL
639603	2017 FX_{120}	—	May 18, 2004	Campo Imperatore	CINEOS	·	1.7 km	MPC · JPL
639604	2017 FE_{121}	—	August 8, 2004	Socorro	LINEAR	AGN	1.8 km	MPC · JPL
639605	2017 FX_{121}	—	February 28, 2008	Kitt Peak	Spacewatch	·	2.0 km	MPC · JPL
639606	2017 FK_{122}	—	April 16, 2004	Kitt Peak	Spacewatch	·	1.9 km	MPC · JPL
639607	2017 FM_{124}	—	September 29, 2005	Mount Lemmon	Mount Lemmon Survey	KOR	1.3 km	MPC · JPL
639608	2017 FM_{125}	—	March 20, 2002	Kitt Peak	Spacewatch	·	2.0 km	MPC · JPL
639609	2017 FM_{130}	—	October 1, 2005	Mount Lemmon	Mount Lemmon Survey	·	1.7 km	MPC · JPL
639610	2017 FA_{132}	—	February 28, 2008	Kitt Peak	Spacewatch	MRX	850 m	MPC · JPL
639611	2017 FC_{134}	—	April 15, 2008	Kitt Peak	Spacewatch	·	1.7 km	MPC · JPL
639612	2017 FT_{135}	—	February 23, 1998	Kitt Peak	Spacewatch	·	3.3 km	MPC · JPL
639613	2017 FW_{135}	—	November 26, 2005	Mount Lemmon	Mount Lemmon Survey	·	1.7 km	MPC · JPL
639614	2017 FT_{136}	—	September 19, 2014	Haleakala	Pan-STARRS 1	·	3.3 km	MPC · JPL
639615	2017 FQ_{138}	—	March 26, 2017	Mount Lemmon	Mount Lemmon Survey	AGN	950 m	MPC · JPL
639616	2017 FS_{138}	—	March 29, 2008	Kitt Peak	Spacewatch	AGN	1.1 km	MPC · JPL
639617	2017 FS_{142}	—	December 3, 2015	Haleakala	Pan-STARRS 1	·	970 m	MPC · JPL
639618	2017 FO_{144}	—	October 21, 2003	Kitt Peak	Spacewatch	·	2.9 km	MPC · JPL
639619	2017 FM_{146}	—	June 16, 2007	Kitt Peak	Spacewatch	EOS	2.3 km	MPC · JPL
639620	2017 FO_{148}	—	February 15, 2012	Haleakala	Pan-STARRS 1	HOF	2.0 km	MPC · JPL
639621	2017 FD_{149}	—	November 24, 2009	Kitt Peak	Spacewatch	·	2.4 km	MPC · JPL
639622	2017 FE_{150}	—	February 2, 2008	Kitt Peak	Spacewatch	·	1.3 km	MPC · JPL
639623	2017 FV_{150}	—	January 23, 2006	Kitt Peak	Spacewatch	·	2.5 km	MPC · JPL
639624	2017 FG_{152}	—	September 18, 2010	Mount Lemmon	Mount Lemmon Survey	·	1.4 km	MPC · JPL
639625	2017 FC_{154}	—	September 27, 2009	Mount Lemmon	Mount Lemmon Survey	HYG	2.4 km	MPC · JPL
639626	2017 FF_{155}	—	April 2, 2011	Mount Lemmon	Mount Lemmon Survey	·	3.1 km	MPC · JPL
639627	2017 FA_{158}	—	February 10, 1994	Kitt Peak	Spacewatch	·	1.5 km	MPC · JPL
639628	2017 FK_{158}	—	December 25, 2005	Kitt Peak	Spacewatch	·	1.8 km	MPC · JPL
639629	2017 FM_{158}	—	April 7, 2003	Kitt Peak	Spacewatch	·	2.3 km	MPC · JPL
639630	2017 FL_{159}	—	November 14, 2010	Mount Lemmon	Mount Lemmon Survey	·	2.0 km	MPC · JPL
639631	2017 FG_{160}	—	July 28, 2014	Haleakala	Pan-STARRS 1	·	1.2 km	MPC · JPL
639632	2017 FP_{160}	—	April 5, 2008	Mount Lemmon	Mount Lemmon Survey	·	1.4 km	MPC · JPL
639633	2017 FS_{160}	—	August 18, 2014	Haleakala	Pan-STARRS 1	·	1.5 km	MPC · JPL
639634	2017 FG_{162}	—	August 3, 2014	Haleakala	Pan-STARRS 1	·	1.3 km	MPC · JPL
639635	2017 FN_{162}	—	February 25, 2011	Mount Lemmon	Mount Lemmon Survey	THM	2.1 km	MPC · JPL
639636	2017 FP_{162}	—	October 25, 2005	Kitt Peak	Spacewatch	HOF	2.3 km	MPC · JPL
639637	2017 FB_{188}	—	September 26, 2014	Catalina	CSS	·	1.5 km	MPC · JPL
639638	2017 FK_{188}	—	March 27, 2017	Haleakala	Pan-STARRS 1	KON	1.8 km	MPC · JPL
639639	2017 FD_{206}	—	March 21, 2017	Haleakala	Pan-STARRS 1	·	1.4 km	MPC · JPL
639640	2017 FY_{212}	—	March 19, 2017	Haleakala	Pan-STARRS 1	·	1.4 km	MPC · JPL
639641	2017 GM_{1}	—	April 12, 2013	Haleakala	Pan-STARRS 1	·	1.1 km	MPC · JPL
639642	2017 GR_{1}	—	October 22, 2005	Kitt Peak	Spacewatch	·	1.7 km	MPC · JPL
639643	2017 GE_{4}	—	October 3, 2005	Palomar	NEAT	H	500 m	MPC · JPL
639644	2017 GX_{8}	—	February 4, 2006	Catalina	CSS	·	4.1 km	MPC · JPL
639645	2017 GA_{9}	—	November 26, 2009	Kitt Peak	Spacewatch	·	1.8 km	MPC · JPL
639646	2017 GD_{9}	—	April 20, 2012	Kitt Peak	Spacewatch	·	1.9 km	MPC · JPL
639647	2017 GE_{9}	—	April 22, 2007	Kitt Peak	Spacewatch	·	1.6 km	MPC · JPL
639648	2017 GS_{9}	—	May 30, 2008	Mount Lemmon	Mount Lemmon Survey	AGN	1.2 km	MPC · JPL
639649	2017 GE_{10}	—	December 14, 2010	Mount Lemmon	Mount Lemmon Survey	AGN	990 m	MPC · JPL
639650	2017 GH_{17}	—	April 1, 2017	Haleakala	Pan-STARRS 1	·	1.6 km	MPC · JPL
639651	2017 HQ	—	May 14, 2009	Mount Lemmon	Mount Lemmon Survey	H	540 m	MPC · JPL
639652	2017 HE_{3}	—	February 4, 2017	Haleakala	Pan-STARRS 1	TIN	1.0 km	MPC · JPL
639653	2017 HR_{5}	—	March 25, 2006	Kitt Peak	Spacewatch	·	2.8 km	MPC · JPL
639654	2017 HM_{6}	—	April 11, 2008	Kitt Peak	Spacewatch	·	1.6 km	MPC · JPL
639655	2017 HN_{6}	—	April 8, 2002	Palomar	NEAT	KOR	1.5 km	MPC · JPL
639656	2017 HV_{6}	—	December 21, 2006	Kitt Peak	Spacewatch	HOF	2.6 km	MPC · JPL
639657	2017 HJ_{9}	—	January 31, 2006	Kitt Peak	Spacewatch	THM	2.8 km	MPC · JPL
639658	2017 HR_{9}	—	January 27, 2007	Mount Lemmon	Mount Lemmon Survey	HOF	2.3 km	MPC · JPL
639659	2017 HS_{9}	—	November 12, 2005	Kitt Peak	Spacewatch	·	2.4 km	MPC · JPL
639660	2017 HS_{10}	—	December 4, 2005	Kitt Peak	Spacewatch	BRA	1.5 km	MPC · JPL
639661	2017 HA_{13}	—	August 20, 2014	Haleakala	Pan-STARRS 1	·	1.4 km	MPC · JPL
639662	2017 HP_{14}	—	April 15, 2008	Mount Lemmon	Mount Lemmon Survey	·	1.5 km	MPC · JPL
639663	2017 HN_{15}	—	May 8, 2006	Mount Lemmon	Mount Lemmon Survey	LIX	3.7 km	MPC · JPL
639664	2017 HE_{17}	—	September 17, 2009	Kitt Peak	Spacewatch	·	1.8 km	MPC · JPL
639665	2017 HJ_{17}	—	March 13, 2007	Mount Lemmon	Mount Lemmon Survey	·	1.6 km	MPC · JPL
639666	2017 HX_{17}	—	November 1, 2005	Mount Lemmon	Mount Lemmon Survey	·	1.8 km	MPC · JPL
639667	2017 HN_{18}	—	April 2, 2002	Kitt Peak	Spacewatch	·	1.6 km	MPC · JPL
639668	2017 HV_{19}	—	October 27, 2005	Kitt Peak	Spacewatch	·	1.6 km	MPC · JPL
639669	2017 HZ_{19}	—	October 27, 2009	Mount Lemmon	Mount Lemmon Survey	·	1.7 km	MPC · JPL
639670	2017 HK_{21}	—	March 24, 2003	Kitt Peak	Spacewatch	·	2.4 km	MPC · JPL
639671	2017 HS_{21}	—	March 25, 2006	Kitt Peak	Spacewatch	·	2.5 km	MPC · JPL
639672	2017 HT_{21}	—	September 17, 2009	Mount Lemmon	Mount Lemmon Survey	·	1.6 km	MPC · JPL
639673	2017 HK_{23}	—	March 12, 2008	Catalina	CSS	·	1.7 km	MPC · JPL
639674	2017 HB_{25}	—	November 26, 2005	Kitt Peak	Spacewatch	·	2.1 km	MPC · JPL
639675	2017 HZ_{28}	—	October 18, 2004	Kitt Peak	Deep Ecliptic Survey	KOR	1.2 km	MPC · JPL
639676	2017 HG_{32}	—	September 29, 2005	Kitt Peak	Spacewatch	·	1.8 km	MPC · JPL
639677	2017 HD_{33}	—	February 11, 2008	Mount Lemmon	Mount Lemmon Survey	·	1.3 km	MPC · JPL
639678	2017 HW_{33}	—	May 21, 2006	Kitt Peak	Spacewatch	·	2.7 km	MPC · JPL
639679	2017 HT_{34}	—	March 1, 2011	Mount Lemmon	Mount Lemmon Survey	·	1.4 km	MPC · JPL
639680	2017 HW_{36}	—	May 3, 2008	Mount Lemmon	Mount Lemmon Survey	·	1.5 km	MPC · JPL
639681	2017 HW_{37}	—	February 9, 2008	Kitt Peak	Spacewatch	·	1.1 km	MPC · JPL
639682	2017 HA_{39}	—	March 23, 2004	Kitt Peak	Spacewatch	·	1.2 km	MPC · JPL
639683	2017 HP_{40}	—	November 17, 2008	Kitt Peak	Spacewatch	·	2.3 km	MPC · JPL
639684	2017 HQ_{40}	—	April 20, 2012	Mount Lemmon	Mount Lemmon Survey	·	1.6 km	MPC · JPL
639685	2017 HQ_{42}	—	September 4, 2014	Haleakala	Pan-STARRS 1	·	2.4 km	MPC · JPL
639686	2017 HX_{42}	—	November 23, 2014	Haleakala	Pan-STARRS 1	·	1.8 km	MPC · JPL
639687	2017 HO_{43}	—	May 8, 2013	Haleakala	Pan-STARRS 1	·	1.2 km	MPC · JPL
639688	2017 HJ_{45}	—	September 10, 2008	Kitt Peak	Spacewatch	·	1.6 km	MPC · JPL
639689	2017 HM_{45}	—	September 28, 2003	Kitt Peak	Spacewatch	·	2.4 km	MPC · JPL
639690	2017 HC_{46}	—	October 8, 2008	Mount Lemmon	Mount Lemmon Survey	VER	3.0 km	MPC · JPL
639691	2017 HT_{48}	—	March 20, 2001	Kitt Peak	Spacewatch	·	870 m	MPC · JPL
639692	2017 HY_{59}	—	October 26, 2005	Kitt Peak	Spacewatch	AST	1.5 km	MPC · JPL
639693	2017 HR_{61}	—	October 4, 1999	Kitt Peak	Spacewatch	·	1.2 km	MPC · JPL
639694	2017 HF_{62}	—	April 1, 2003	Apache Point	SDSS	·	1.9 km	MPC · JPL
639695	2017 JJ	—	March 9, 2005	Mount Lemmon	Mount Lemmon Survey	·	3.8 km	MPC · JPL
639696	2017 JL	—	October 23, 2003	Apache Point	SDSS Collaboration	EOS	2.0 km	MPC · JPL
639697	2017 JY_{3}	—	December 11, 2010	Mount Lemmon	Mount Lemmon Survey	·	2.6 km	MPC · JPL
639698	2017 KJ_{6}	—	April 17, 2012	Kitt Peak	Spacewatch	·	2.0 km	MPC · JPL
639699	2017 KG_{7}	—	April 23, 2007	Kitt Peak	Spacewatch	·	2.3 km	MPC · JPL
639700	2017 KH_{9}	—	March 3, 2016	Mount Lemmon	Mount Lemmon Survey	EOS	1.7 km	MPC · JPL

== 639701–639800 ==
back to top

Designation			Discovery			Properties		Ref
Permanent	Provisional	Named after	Date	Site	Discoverer(s)	Category	Diam.	Ref
639701	2017 KG_{13}	—	September 21, 2003	Palomar	NEAT	EOS	2.5 km	MPC · JPL
639702	2017 KS_{19}	—	November 16, 1998	Kitt Peak	Spacewatch	·	3.1 km	MPC · JPL
639703	2017 KK_{20}	—	October 15, 2009	Mount Lemmon	Mount Lemmon Survey	·	1.6 km	MPC · JPL
639704	2017 KS_{21}	—	July 29, 2008	Mount Lemmon	Mount Lemmon Survey	·	1.7 km	MPC · JPL
639705	2017 KR_{25}	—	March 9, 2005	Kitt Peak	Spacewatch	·	3.3 km	MPC · JPL
639706	2017 KW_{25}	—	October 10, 2008	Kitt Peak	Spacewatch	EOS	1.4 km	MPC · JPL
639707	2017 KO_{29}	—	March 13, 2007	Mount Lemmon	Mount Lemmon Survey	BRA	1.3 km	MPC · JPL
639708	2017 KJ_{30}	—	April 27, 2012	Haleakala	Pan-STARRS 1	·	2.1 km	MPC · JPL
639709	2017 KP_{33}	—	April 15, 2001	Kitt Peak	Spacewatch	·	3.0 km	MPC · JPL
639710	2017 KE_{39}	—	December 18, 2007	Mount Lemmon	Mount Lemmon Survey	RAF	880 m	MPC · JPL
639711	2017 KY_{47}	—	May 27, 2017	Haleakala	Pan-STARRS 1	·	1.9 km	MPC · JPL
639712	2017 NW_{3}	—	October 24, 2005	Mauna Kea	A. Boattini	·	2.6 km	MPC · JPL
639713	2017 NH_{9}	—	July 5, 2017	Haleakala	Pan-STARRS 1	·	2.4 km	MPC · JPL
639714	2017 OF_{12}	—	October 31, 2008	Mount Lemmon	Mount Lemmon Survey	·	1.4 km	MPC · JPL
639715	2017 OW_{14}	—	February 16, 2015	Haleakala	Pan-STARRS 1	HYG	2.3 km	MPC · JPL
639716	2017 OW_{29}	—	October 18, 2003	Apache Point	SDSS Collaboration	·	3.2 km	MPC · JPL
639717	2017 OC_{31}	—	December 25, 2013	Mount Lemmon	Mount Lemmon Survey	EOS	1.6 km	MPC · JPL
639718	2017 OB_{44}	—	October 15, 2007	Mount Lemmon	Mount Lemmon Survey	EOS	1.5 km	MPC · JPL
639719	2017 OS_{47}	—	November 1, 2008	Mount Lemmon	Mount Lemmon Survey	·	910 m	MPC · JPL
639720	2017 OY_{47}	—	February 3, 2009	Kitt Peak	Spacewatch	·	640 m	MPC · JPL
639721	2017 OZ_{51}	—	February 16, 2015	Haleakala	Pan-STARRS 1	EOS	1.6 km	MPC · JPL
639722	2017 OG_{52}	—	November 11, 2013	Mount Lemmon	Mount Lemmon Survey	·	1.6 km	MPC · JPL
639723	2017 OZ_{55}	—	June 12, 2007	Kitt Peak	Spacewatch	·	2.0 km	MPC · JPL
639724	2017 OK_{57}	—	August 31, 2000	Kitt Peak	Spacewatch	·	2.9 km	MPC · JPL
639725	2017 OS_{60}	—	April 12, 2005	Kitt Peak	Spacewatch	·	1.7 km	MPC · JPL
639726	2017 OJ_{63}	—	July 26, 2011	Haleakala	Pan-STARRS 1	·	2.7 km	MPC · JPL
639727	2017 OK_{64}	—	January 21, 2014	Mount Lemmon	Mount Lemmon Survey	·	2.3 km	MPC · JPL
639728	2017 OG_{94}	—	April 30, 2016	Haleakala	Pan-STARRS 1	KOR	1.1 km	MPC · JPL
639729	2017 OS_{95}	—	July 30, 2017	Haleakala	Pan-STARRS 1	·	2.1 km	MPC · JPL
639730	2017 OV_{105}	—	July 25, 2017	Haleakala	Pan-STARRS 1	·	2.4 km	MPC · JPL
639731	2017 OF_{114}	—	August 17, 2012	Haleakala	Pan-STARRS 1	·	1.4 km	MPC · JPL
639732	2017 OG_{115}	—	July 26, 2017	Haleakala	Pan-STARRS 1	EOS	1.6 km	MPC · JPL
639733	2017 OL_{141}	—	July 25, 2017	Haleakala	Pan-STARRS 1	EOS	1.4 km	MPC · JPL
639734	2017 OA_{152}	—	January 29, 2015	Haleakala	Pan-STARRS 1	·	1.5 km	MPC · JPL
639735	2017 PJ_{2}	—	January 28, 2014	Mount Lemmon	Mount Lemmon Survey	·	2.2 km	MPC · JPL
639736	2017 PP_{7}	—	August 1, 2017	Haleakala	Pan-STARRS 1	·	1.8 km	MPC · JPL
639737	2017 PP_{11}	—	May 22, 2011	Mount Lemmon	Mount Lemmon Survey	KOR	1.1 km	MPC · JPL
639738	2017 PR_{13}	—	March 14, 2010	Mount Lemmon	Mount Lemmon Survey	KOR	1.1 km	MPC · JPL
639739	2017 PR_{27}	—	October 28, 1995	Kitt Peak	Spacewatch	·	2.0 km	MPC · JPL
639740	2017 PH_{31}	—	January 2, 2009	Kitt Peak	Spacewatch	·	1.4 km	MPC · JPL
639741	2017 PG_{37}	—	September 28, 2006	Kitt Peak	Spacewatch	·	1.1 km	MPC · JPL
639742	2017 PX_{38}	—	September 10, 2007	Mount Lemmon	Mount Lemmon Survey	·	1.9 km	MPC · JPL
639743	2017 PL_{53}	—	August 1, 2017	Haleakala	Pan-STARRS 1	·	2.7 km	MPC · JPL
639744	2017 PW_{71}	—	August 1, 2017	Haleakala	Pan-STARRS 1	·	2.2 km	MPC · JPL
639745	2017 PE_{86}	—	August 14, 2017	Haleakala	Pan-STARRS 1	·	2.0 km	MPC · JPL
639746	2017 QH_{20}	—	October 24, 2009	Kitt Peak	Spacewatch	·	1.3 km	MPC · JPL
639747	2017 QQ_{21}	—	September 20, 2003	Kitt Peak	Spacewatch	·	2.2 km	MPC · JPL
639748	2017 QR_{24}	—	October 19, 2012	Haleakala	Pan-STARRS 1	EOS	1.7 km	MPC · JPL
639749	2017 QP_{25}	—	July 27, 2017	Haleakala	Pan-STARRS 1	·	2.5 km	MPC · JPL
639750	2017 QL_{27}	—	August 28, 2006	Kitt Peak	Spacewatch	·	2.4 km	MPC · JPL
639751	2017 QW_{36}	—	August 16, 2017	Haleakala	Pan-STARRS 1	·	1.5 km	MPC · JPL
639752	2017 QE_{38}	—	October 11, 2012	Mount Lemmon	Mount Lemmon Survey	·	2.0 km	MPC · JPL
639753	2017 QZ_{51}	—	August 16, 2012	ESA OGS	ESA OGS	·	1.7 km	MPC · JPL
639754	2017 QE_{53}	—	August 22, 2001	Kitt Peak	Spacewatch	·	2.2 km	MPC · JPL
639755	2017 QM_{56}	—	August 30, 2002	Palomar	NEAT	·	2.4 km	MPC · JPL
639756	2017 QS_{56}	—	September 23, 2012	Mount Lemmon	Mount Lemmon Survey	·	2.1 km	MPC · JPL
639757	2017 QF_{58}	—	May 21, 2004	Kitt Peak	Spacewatch	THM	2.4 km	MPC · JPL
639758	2017 QD_{61}	—	December 15, 2007	Bergisch Gladbach	W. Bickel	·	730 m	MPC · JPL
639759	2017 QP_{63}	—	August 23, 2017	Haleakala	Pan-STARRS 1	·	1.8 km	MPC · JPL
639760	2017 QV_{63}	—	January 17, 2005	Kitt Peak	Spacewatch	·	2.0 km	MPC · JPL
639761	2017 QD_{67}	—	February 1, 2003	Palomar	NEAT	·	3.3 km	MPC · JPL
639762	2017 QL_{91}	—	August 18, 2017	Haleakala	Pan-STARRS 1	HYG	2.3 km	MPC · JPL
639763	2017 QX_{91}	—	August 24, 2017	Haleakala	Pan-STARRS 1	VER	2.1 km	MPC · JPL
639764	2017 QZ_{91}	—	August 16, 2017	Haleakala	Pan-STARRS 1	·	1.9 km	MPC · JPL
639765	2017 QS_{97}	—	August 16, 2017	Haleakala	Pan-STARRS 1	·	2.3 km	MPC · JPL
639766	2017 QC_{103}	—	August 31, 2017	Haleakala	Pan-STARRS 1	EOS	1.6 km	MPC · JPL
639767	2017 QY_{112}	—	August 22, 2017	Haleakala	Pan-STARRS 1	·	2.6 km	MPC · JPL
639768	2017 QA_{120}	—	August 28, 2017	Mount Lemmon	Mount Lemmon Survey	EOS	1.6 km	MPC · JPL
639769	2017 QW_{124}	—	August 16, 2017	Haleakala	Pan-STARRS 1	·	1.4 km	MPC · JPL
639770	2017 RC_{7}	—	September 25, 2006	Mount Lemmon	Mount Lemmon Survey	THM	2.3 km	MPC · JPL
639771	2017 RT_{8}	—	July 30, 2008	Mount Lemmon	Mount Lemmon Survey	·	1.4 km	MPC · JPL
639772	2017 RU_{10}	—	September 15, 2006	Kitt Peak	Spacewatch	·	2.1 km	MPC · JPL
639773	2017 RX_{24}	—	June 29, 2005	Kitt Peak	Spacewatch	·	2.9 km	MPC · JPL
639774	2017 RX_{34}	—	June 29, 2016	Haleakala	Pan-STARRS 1	·	2.5 km	MPC · JPL
639775	2017 RG_{37}	—	August 19, 2006	Kitt Peak	Spacewatch	·	1.9 km	MPC · JPL
639776	2017 RO_{41}	—	June 7, 2016	Haleakala	Pan-STARRS 1	EOS	1.3 km	MPC · JPL
639777	2017 RF_{47}	—	February 26, 2015	Mount Lemmon	Mount Lemmon Survey	·	1.7 km	MPC · JPL
639778	2017 RS_{50}	—	September 25, 2006	Mount Lemmon	Mount Lemmon Survey	·	2.3 km	MPC · JPL
639779	2017 RH_{54}	—	September 19, 2006	Kitt Peak	Spacewatch	·	2.3 km	MPC · JPL
639780	2017 RJ_{57}	—	August 19, 2006	Kitt Peak	Spacewatch	·	2.5 km	MPC · JPL
639781	2017 RK_{60}	—	October 11, 2012	Haleakala	Pan-STARRS 1	·	2.1 km	MPC · JPL
639782	2017 RK_{64}	—	March 12, 2000	Kitt Peak	Spacewatch	·	2.7 km	MPC · JPL
639783	2017 RH_{74}	—	June 22, 2006	Palomar	NEAT	·	1.4 km	MPC · JPL
639784	2017 RP_{74}	—	November 3, 2007	Kitt Peak	Spacewatch	·	2.3 km	MPC · JPL
639785	2017 RG_{75}	—	November 2, 2012	Mount Lemmon	Mount Lemmon Survey	·	2.0 km	MPC · JPL
639786	2017 RJ_{85}	—	February 16, 2015	Haleakala	Pan-STARRS 1	·	2.3 km	MPC · JPL
639787	2017 RD_{93}	—	April 14, 2010	Mount Lemmon	Mount Lemmon Survey	THM	1.8 km	MPC · JPL
639788	2017 RC_{100}	—	September 14, 2007	Mount Lemmon	Mount Lemmon Survey	EOS	1.9 km	MPC · JPL
639789	2017 RS_{104}	—	December 31, 2013	Kitt Peak	Spacewatch	(1118)	2.7 km	MPC · JPL
639790	2017 RG_{107}	—	December 5, 2007	Kitt Peak	Spacewatch	·	2.6 km	MPC · JPL
639791	2017 RD_{120}	—	September 14, 2017	Haleakala	Pan-STARRS 1	·	2.5 km	MPC · JPL
639792	2017 RV_{131}	—	September 11, 2017	Haleakala	Pan-STARRS 1	·	2.1 km	MPC · JPL
639793	2017 SS_{5}	—	November 15, 1995	Kitt Peak	Spacewatch	·	2.6 km	MPC · JPL
639794	2017 SU_{5}	—	October 20, 2006	Kitt Peak	Spacewatch	·	2.6 km	MPC · JPL
639795	2017 SD_{8}	—	February 10, 2014	Haleakala	Pan-STARRS 1	·	2.8 km	MPC · JPL
639796	2017 SB_{27}	—	December 22, 2008	Mount Lemmon	Mount Lemmon Survey	·	1.4 km	MPC · JPL
639797	2017 SD_{34}	—	October 4, 2002	Campo Imperatore	CINEOS	·	1.3 km	MPC · JPL
639798	2017 ST_{38}	—	September 28, 2006	Catalina	CSS	LIX	3.0 km	MPC · JPL
639799	2017 SQ_{43}	—	August 19, 2006	Kitt Peak	Spacewatch	·	2.6 km	MPC · JPL
639800	2017 SO_{44}	—	October 16, 2007	Mount Lemmon	Mount Lemmon Survey	EOS	1.5 km	MPC · JPL

== 639801–639900 ==
back to top

Designation			Discovery			Properties		Ref
Permanent	Provisional	Named after	Date	Site	Discoverer(s)	Category	Diam.	Ref
639801	2017 SE_{45}	—	January 19, 2004	Kitt Peak	Spacewatch	·	1.8 km	MPC · JPL
639802	2017 SV_{52}	—	July 30, 2000	Cerro Tololo	Deep Ecliptic Survey	EOS	2.1 km	MPC · JPL
639803	2017 SN_{53}	—	April 19, 2015	Cerro Tololo-DECam	DECam	·	3.3 km	MPC · JPL
639804	2017 SN_{66}	—	July 4, 1995	Kitt Peak	Spacewatch	·	1.3 km	MPC · JPL
639805	2017 SA_{71}	—	September 13, 2007	Mount Lemmon	Mount Lemmon Survey	·	1.6 km	MPC · JPL
639806	2017 SD_{81}	—	August 30, 2005	Kitt Peak	Spacewatch	·	2.8 km	MPC · JPL
639807	2017 SJ_{83}	—	May 20, 2015	Cerro Tololo	DECam	·	2.1 km	MPC · JPL
639808	2017 ST_{90}	—	August 20, 2017	Haleakala	Pan-STARRS 1	·	2.2 km	MPC · JPL
639809	2017 ST_{94}	—	October 20, 2012	Kitt Peak	Spacewatch	·	2.2 km	MPC · JPL
639810	2017 SD_{95}	—	July 19, 2007	Mount Lemmon	Mount Lemmon Survey	·	2.0 km	MPC · JPL
639811	2017 SH_{96}	—	April 9, 2010	Kitt Peak	Spacewatch	·	2.7 km	MPC · JPL
639812	2017 SC_{97}	—	March 18, 2015	Haleakala	Pan-STARRS 1	·	2.6 km	MPC · JPL
639813	2017 SK_{97}	—	September 30, 2006	Mount Lemmon	Mount Lemmon Survey	·	2.5 km	MPC · JPL
639814	2017 SM_{104}	—	October 13, 2006	Kitt Peak	Spacewatch	·	2.2 km	MPC · JPL
639815	2017 SG_{107}	—	April 4, 2005	Mount Lemmon	Mount Lemmon Survey	·	1.2 km	MPC · JPL
639816	2017 SQ_{108}	—	November 20, 2006	Mount Lemmon	Mount Lemmon Survey	·	2.8 km	MPC · JPL
639817	2017 SV_{108}	—	August 30, 2011	Haleakala	Pan-STARRS 1	·	2.4 km	MPC · JPL
639818	2017 SC_{112}	—	September 21, 2011	Mount Lemmon	Mount Lemmon Survey	·	3.4 km	MPC · JPL
639819	2017 SH_{118}	—	September 13, 2003	Haleakala	NEAT	·	2.5 km	MPC · JPL
639820	2017 SX_{197}	—	May 18, 2015	Haleakala	Pan-STARRS 1	·	2.3 km	MPC · JPL
639821	2017 SF_{198}	—	September 30, 2017	Haleakala	Pan-STARRS 1	EMA	2.3 km	MPC · JPL
639822	2017 SA_{209}	—	September 22, 2017	Haleakala	Pan-STARRS 1	EOS	1.6 km	MPC · JPL
639823	2017 SO_{218}	—	May 20, 2015	Cerro Tololo	DECam	·	1.3 km	MPC · JPL
639824	2017 SU_{226}	—	May 19, 2015	Cerro Tololo	DECam	VER	2.4 km	MPC · JPL
639825	2017 SS_{227}	—	June 11, 2015	Haleakala	Pan-STARRS 1	·	2.2 km	MPC · JPL
639826	2017 SZ_{243}	—	September 27, 2017	Haleakala	Pan-STARRS 1	HYG	2.2 km	MPC · JPL
639827	2017 SC_{250}	—	September 24, 2017	Haleakala	Pan-STARRS 1	·	1.8 km	MPC · JPL
639828	2017 SJ_{262}	—	September 22, 2017	Haleakala	Pan-STARRS 1	ARM	3.1 km	MPC · JPL
639829	2017 SN_{326}	—	September 27, 2017	Haleakala	Pan-STARRS 1	·	2.2 km	MPC · JPL
639830	2017 TJ_{9}	—	June 18, 2015	Haleakala	Pan-STARRS 1	·	3.4 km	MPC · JPL
639831	2017 TR_{24}	—	October 11, 2017	Haleakala	Pan-STARRS 1	·	2.7 km	MPC · JPL
639832	2017 TV_{24}	—	September 19, 2017	Haleakala	Pan-STARRS 1	·	1.9 km	MPC · JPL
639833	2017 UN_{6}	—	July 24, 2015	Haleakala	Pan-STARRS 1	T_{j} (2.93)	4.2 km	MPC · JPL
639834	2017 UK_{10}	—	November 20, 2001	Socorro	LINEAR	·	2.0 km	MPC · JPL
639835	2017 US_{12}	—	July 30, 2017	Haleakala	Pan-STARRS 1	EOS	1.5 km	MPC · JPL
639836	2017 UQ_{14}	—	February 2, 2009	Mount Lemmon	Mount Lemmon Survey	·	2.2 km	MPC · JPL
639837	2017 UZ_{15}	—	August 29, 2006	Kitt Peak	Spacewatch	EMA	2.4 km	MPC · JPL
639838	2017 UP_{19}	—	March 5, 2006	Mount Lemmon	Mount Lemmon Survey	·	1.6 km	MPC · JPL
639839	2017 UZ_{35}	—	September 29, 2001	Palomar	NEAT	·	2.4 km	MPC · JPL
639840	2017 UM_{40}	—	September 13, 2005	Kitt Peak	Spacewatch	·	3.3 km	MPC · JPL
639841	2017 UU_{104}	—	October 22, 2017	Mount Lemmon	Mount Lemmon Survey	·	2.0 km	MPC · JPL
639842	2017 UH_{121}	—	February 14, 2015	Mount Lemmon	Mount Lemmon Survey	VER	2.7 km	MPC · JPL
639843	2017 VT_{3}	—	December 21, 2012	Piszkéstető	K. Sárneczky, Hodosan, G.	·	2.2 km	MPC · JPL
639844	2017 VJ_{5}	—	November 12, 2006	Lulin	LUSS	·	3.6 km	MPC · JPL
639845	2017 VZ_{11}	—	October 20, 2001	Socorro	LINEAR	·	2.8 km	MPC · JPL
639846	2017 VB_{23}	—	September 24, 2011	Mayhill-ISON	L. Elenin	·	3.9 km	MPC · JPL
639847	2017 VX_{23}	—	March 5, 2014	ESA OGS	ESA OGS	·	2.8 km	MPC · JPL
639848	2017 VZ_{26}	—	September 18, 2006	Kitt Peak	Spacewatch	·	2.0 km	MPC · JPL
639849	2017 VY_{27}	—	October 28, 2010	Mount Lemmon	Mount Lemmon Survey	·	760 m	MPC · JPL
639850	2017 VL_{28}	—	November 1, 2006	Mount Lemmon	Mount Lemmon Survey	·	3.0 km	MPC · JPL
639851	2017 VP_{46}	—	November 14, 2017	Mount Lemmon	Mount Lemmon Survey	·	760 m	MPC · JPL
639852	2017 WQ_{2}	—	September 8, 2011	Haleakala	Pan-STARRS 1	·	3.5 km	MPC · JPL
639853	2017 WY_{5}	—	December 22, 2000	Kitt Peak	Spacewatch	·	3.5 km	MPC · JPL
639854	2017 WD_{6}	—	January 2, 2009	Kitt Peak	Spacewatch	·	770 m	MPC · JPL
639855	2017 WW_{8}	—	August 30, 2005	Kitt Peak	Spacewatch	·	2.8 km	MPC · JPL
639856	2017 WZ_{45}	—	May 20, 2014	Haleakala	Pan-STARRS 1	·	2.4 km	MPC · JPL
639857	2017 WJ_{81}	—	November 18, 2017	Haleakala	Pan-STARRS 1	·	2.6 km	MPC · JPL
639858	2017 XN_{41}	—	October 22, 2011	Mount Lemmon	Mount Lemmon Survey	·	2.2 km	MPC · JPL
639859	2017 XZ_{41}	—	October 18, 2003	Kitt Peak	Spacewatch	·	700 m	MPC · JPL
639860	2017 XY_{55}	—	November 25, 2011	Haleakala	Pan-STARRS 1	·	3.0 km	MPC · JPL
639861	2017 XL_{59}	—	November 23, 2006	Mount Lemmon	Mount Lemmon Survey	EUP	4.3 km	MPC · JPL
639862	2017 YX_{15}	—	November 18, 2011	Catalina	CSS	·	4.1 km	MPC · JPL
639863	2018 AP_{5}	—	September 15, 2004	Kitt Peak	Spacewatch	·	1.2 km	MPC · JPL
639864	2018 AX_{9}	—	September 20, 2006	Palomar	NEAT	·	920 m	MPC · JPL
639865	2018 AN_{15}	—	August 31, 2002	Kitt Peak	Spacewatch	·	1.7 km	MPC · JPL
639866	2018 AV_{26}	—	January 13, 2018	Mount Lemmon	Mount Lemmon Survey	V	530 m	MPC · JPL
639867	2018 AX_{26}	—	January 14, 2018	Haleakala	Pan-STARRS 1	L5	9.1 km	MPC · JPL
639868	2018 AA_{30}	—	January 12, 2018	Haleakala	Pan-STARRS 1	L5	7.1 km	MPC · JPL
639869	2018 BC_{2}	—	November 12, 2005	Kitt Peak	Spacewatch	·	3.6 km	MPC · JPL
639870	2018 BA_{11}	—	December 30, 2000	Socorro	LINEAR	T_{j} (2.97)	3.4 km	MPC · JPL
639871	2018 BP_{12}	—	October 2, 2003	Kitt Peak	Spacewatch	·	570 m	MPC · JPL
639872	2018 BK_{19}	—	January 16, 2018	Haleakala	Pan-STARRS 1	L5	6.9 km	MPC · JPL
639873	2018 BK_{27}	—	February 25, 2011	Kitt Peak	Spacewatch	·	980 m	MPC · JPL
639874	2018 BW_{30}	—	January 20, 2018	Mount Lemmon	Mount Lemmon Survey	·	3.5 km	MPC · JPL
639875	2018 BC_{38}	—	March 10, 2007	Mount Lemmon	Mount Lemmon Survey	MAS	690 m	MPC · JPL
639876	2018 CD_{4}	—	February 10, 1999	Kitt Peak	Spacewatch	·	1.8 km	MPC · JPL
639877	2018 CU_{4}	—	October 12, 2010	Mount Lemmon	Mount Lemmon Survey	·	730 m	MPC · JPL
639878	2018 CG_{5}	—	October 6, 2004	Socorro	LINEAR	·	1.6 km	MPC · JPL
639879	2018 CM_{5}	—	April 3, 2011	Drebach	~Knöfel, A., G. Lehmann	·	970 m	MPC · JPL
639880	2018 CT_{5}	—	February 16, 2002	Palomar	NEAT	·	1.3 km	MPC · JPL
639881	2018 CG_{6}	—	November 19, 2003	Anderson Mesa	LONEOS	·	840 m	MPC · JPL
639882	2018 CH_{8}	—	March 26, 2003	Palomar	NEAT	·	1.3 km	MPC · JPL
639883	2018 CV_{9}	—	November 6, 2005	Mount Lemmon	Mount Lemmon Survey	LIX	3.9 km	MPC · JPL
639884	2018 CW_{9}	—	February 14, 2004	Palomar	NEAT	·	2.8 km	MPC · JPL
639885	2018 CV_{10}	—	January 26, 2007	Kitt Peak	Spacewatch	·	3.8 km	MPC · JPL
639886	2018 CA_{12}	—	April 27, 2000	Kitt Peak	Spacewatch	·	1.1 km	MPC · JPL
639887	2018 CG_{12}	—	March 9, 2007	Mount Lemmon	Mount Lemmon Survey	·	990 m	MPC · JPL
639888	2018 CH_{15}	—	July 19, 2015	Haleakala	Pan-STARRS 2	·	3.7 km	MPC · JPL
639889	2018 CC_{16}	—	November 7, 2010	Mount Lemmon	Mount Lemmon Survey	·	3.4 km	MPC · JPL
639890	2018 DN_{10}	—	May 22, 2003	Kitt Peak	Spacewatch	·	1.1 km	MPC · JPL
639891	2018 EX_{8}	—	February 9, 2005	Anderson Mesa	LONEOS	HNS	1.5 km	MPC · JPL
639892	2018 FJ_{6}	—	November 19, 2016	Mount Lemmon	Mount Lemmon Survey	·	680 m	MPC · JPL
639893	2018 FN_{7}	—	March 13, 2007	Mount Lemmon	Mount Lemmon Survey	NYS	1.1 km	MPC · JPL
639894	2018 FD_{9}	—	October 7, 2005	Kitt Peak	Spacewatch	·	830 m	MPC · JPL
639895	2018 FX_{15}	—	December 4, 2005	Mount Lemmon	Mount Lemmon Survey	·	970 m	MPC · JPL
639896	2018 FS_{17}	—	January 23, 2006	Mount Lemmon	Mount Lemmon Survey	·	2.7 km	MPC · JPL
639897	2018 FM_{18}	—	August 30, 2005	Kitt Peak	Spacewatch	V	570 m	MPC · JPL
639898	2018 FN_{18}	—	August 2, 2008	La Sagra	OAM	·	1.3 km	MPC · JPL
639899	2018 FG_{21}	—	September 23, 2011	Haleakala	Pan-STARRS 1	·	1.1 km	MPC · JPL
639900	2018 FW_{24}	—	January 8, 2007	Mount Lemmon	Mount Lemmon Survey	V	500 m	MPC · JPL

== 639901–640000 ==
back to top

Designation			Discovery			Properties		Ref
Permanent	Provisional	Named after	Date	Site	Discoverer(s)	Category	Diam.	Ref
639901	2018 FV_{25}	—	September 20, 2011	Kitt Peak	Spacewatch	·	2.1 km	MPC · JPL
639902	2018 FQ_{28}	—	March 6, 1999	Kitt Peak	Spacewatch	AGN	1.3 km	MPC · JPL
639903	2018 FR_{28}	—	February 25, 2011	Mount Lemmon	Mount Lemmon Survey	·	1.0 km	MPC · JPL
639904	2018 FB_{29}	—	October 2, 2006	Mount Lemmon	Mount Lemmon Survey	AGN	1.2 km	MPC · JPL
639905	2018 FE_{29}	—	January 7, 2014	Kitt Peak	Spacewatch	·	1.1 km	MPC · JPL
639906	2018 FP_{29}	—	October 8, 2012	Mount Lemmon	Mount Lemmon Survey	·	1.2 km	MPC · JPL
639907	2018 FP_{31}	—	October 18, 2006	Kitt Peak	Spacewatch	·	630 m	MPC · JPL
639908	2018 FC_{46}	—	June 24, 2015	Haleakala	Pan-STARRS 1	·	1.4 km	MPC · JPL
639909	2018 GC_{6}	—	June 14, 2007	Siding Spring	SSS	·	1.4 km	MPC · JPL
639910	2018 GS_{6}	—	November 17, 2006	Mount Lemmon	Mount Lemmon Survey	BRA	2.2 km	MPC · JPL
639911	2018 GG_{7}	—	January 2, 2006	Catalina	CSS	·	4.6 km	MPC · JPL
639912	2018 GK_{7}	—	November 10, 2005	Catalina	CSS	V	680 m	MPC · JPL
639913	2018 GS_{7}	—	August 20, 2004	Kitt Peak	Spacewatch	NYS	1.3 km	MPC · JPL
639914	2018 GU_{8}	—	October 25, 2008	Kitt Peak	Spacewatch	·	1.5 km	MPC · JPL
639915	2018 GV_{8}	—	December 6, 2005	Kitt Peak	Spacewatch	·	2.1 km	MPC · JPL
639916	2018 GP_{9}	—	February 3, 2000	Kitt Peak	Spacewatch	·	820 m	MPC · JPL
639917	2018 GS_{9}	—	January 23, 2006	Kitt Peak	Spacewatch	NYS	1.4 km	MPC · JPL
639918	2018 GH_{11}	—	May 28, 2008	Mount Lemmon	Mount Lemmon Survey	V	680 m	MPC · JPL
639919	2018 GD_{12}	—	August 21, 2015	Haleakala	Pan-STARRS 1	·	940 m	MPC · JPL
639920	2018 GL_{12}	—	April 23, 2007	Kitt Peak	Spacewatch	EOS	2.0 km	MPC · JPL
639921	2018 HK_{1}	—	March 10, 2005	Mount Lemmon	Mount Lemmon Survey	·	1.5 km	MPC · JPL
639922	2018 HO_{4}	—	November 30, 2005	Kitt Peak	Spacewatch	KOR	1.5 km	MPC · JPL
639923	2018 JM_{3}	—	October 8, 2012	Haleakala	Pan-STARRS 1	PHO	1.1 km	MPC · JPL
639924	2018 JJ_{4}	—	March 26, 2001	Socorro	LINEAR	(5)	1.8 km	MPC · JPL
639925	2018 JX_{4}	—	April 13, 2002	Palomar	NEAT	·	2.8 km	MPC · JPL
639926	2018 JK_{5}	—	January 21, 2009	Catalina	CSS	EUN	1.3 km	MPC · JPL
639927	2018 JE_{6}	—	April 10, 2005	Mount Lemmon	Mount Lemmon Survey	·	1.0 km	MPC · JPL
639928	2018 JA_{7}	—	January 14, 2011	Mount Lemmon	Mount Lemmon Survey	EOS	1.7 km	MPC · JPL
639929	2018 KK_{3}	—	May 5, 2011	Mount Lemmon	Mount Lemmon Survey	·	1.1 km	MPC · JPL
639930	2018 LZ_{6}	—	February 14, 2013	Haleakala	Pan-STARRS 1	·	950 m	MPC · JPL
639931	2018 LF_{8}	—	May 29, 2000	Kitt Peak	Spacewatch	·	2.0 km	MPC · JPL
639932	2018 LL_{8}	—	November 4, 2007	Kitt Peak	Spacewatch	·	1.4 km	MPC · JPL
639933	2018 LP_{16}	—	November 14, 2015	Mount Lemmon	Mount Lemmon Survey	EUN	1.3 km	MPC · JPL
639934	2018 LP_{38}	—	June 12, 2018	Haleakala	Pan-STARRS 1	·	1.2 km	MPC · JPL
639935	2018 MK_{1}	—	December 23, 2012	Haleakala	Pan-STARRS 1	·	1.2 km	MPC · JPL
639936	2018 ML_{7}	—	July 2, 2014	Haleakala	Pan-STARRS 1	ADE	1.9 km	MPC · JPL
639937	2018 ME_{14}	—	April 3, 2017	Mount Lemmon	Mount Lemmon Survey	GEF	1.1 km	MPC · JPL
639938	2018 MG_{20}	—	October 4, 2005	Mount Lemmon	Mount Lemmon Survey	·	1.3 km	MPC · JPL
639939	2018 MZ_{26}	—	March 18, 2013	Palomar	Palomar Transient Factory	MAR	1.1 km	MPC · JPL
639940	2018 NP_{6}	—	February 3, 2013	Haleakala	Pan-STARRS 1	L4	7.3 km	MPC · JPL
639941	2018 NS_{9}	—	October 19, 2010	Mount Lemmon	Mount Lemmon Survey	·	1.1 km	MPC · JPL
639942	2018 NG_{14}	—	September 10, 2004	Socorro	LINEAR	·	2.4 km	MPC · JPL
639943	2018 NP_{14}	—	December 13, 2015	Haleakala	Pan-STARRS 1	·	2.1 km	MPC · JPL
639944	2018 NU_{21}	—	June 30, 2013	Haleakala	Pan-STARRS 1	·	1.4 km	MPC · JPL
639945	2018 NV_{22}	—	July 9, 2018	Haleakala	Pan-STARRS 1	·	1.4 km	MPC · JPL
639946	2018 NT_{24}	—	July 11, 2018	Haleakala	Pan-STARRS 1	KOR	1.1 km	MPC · JPL
639947	2018 NX_{26}	—	July 11, 2018	Haleakala	Pan-STARRS 1	·	1.4 km	MPC · JPL
639948	2018 PD_{4}	—	November 18, 2014	Mount Lemmon	Mount Lemmon Survey	AGN	980 m	MPC · JPL
639949	2018 PT_{6}	—	February 8, 2011	Mount Lemmon	Mount Lemmon Survey	KOR	1.1 km	MPC · JPL
639950	2018 PZ_{12}	—	September 30, 2005	Mount Lemmon	Mount Lemmon Survey	MRX	950 m	MPC · JPL
639951	2018 PV_{16}	—	March 6, 2008	Mount Lemmon	Mount Lemmon Survey	·	1.2 km	MPC · JPL
639952	2018 PN_{42}	—	January 20, 2015	Haleakala	Pan-STARRS 1	·	1.8 km	MPC · JPL
639953	2018 PR_{43}	—	August 13, 2018	Haleakala	Pan-STARRS 1	·	2.2 km	MPC · JPL
639954	2018 PF_{51}	—	August 12, 2018	Haleakala	Pan-STARRS 1	·	3.0 km	MPC · JPL
639955	2018 PH_{57}	—	August 11, 2018	Haleakala	Pan-STARRS 1	·	1.4 km	MPC · JPL
639956	2018 PO_{59}	—	August 11, 2018	Haleakala	Pan-STARRS 1	·	1.3 km	MPC · JPL
639957	2018 PO_{65}	—	November 11, 2009	Mount Lemmon	Mount Lemmon Survey	KOR	950 m	MPC · JPL
639958	2018 PQ_{65}	—	May 4, 2017	Haleakala	Pan-STARRS 1	·	1.6 km	MPC · JPL
639959	2018 PM_{115}	—	December 21, 2014	Haleakala	Pan-STARRS 1	·	2.3 km	MPC · JPL
639960	2018 PT_{126}	—	August 8, 2018	Haleakala	Pan-STARRS 1	WIT	760 m	MPC · JPL
639961	2018 QR_{3}	—	January 10, 2008	Kitt Peak	Spacewatch	EUN	1.0 km	MPC · JPL
639962	2018 QT_{11}	—	August 18, 2018	Haleakala	Pan-STARRS 1	·	3.1 km	MPC · JPL
639963	2018 QW_{11}	—	August 18, 2018	Haleakala	Pan-STARRS 1	HOF	1.9 km	MPC · JPL
639964	2018 QZ_{16}	—	August 18, 2018	Haleakala	Pan-STARRS 1	·	1.6 km	MPC · JPL
639965	2018 QL_{19}	—	December 13, 2014	Haleakala	Pan-STARRS 1	·	1.7 km	MPC · JPL
639966	2018 RX_{9}	—	August 13, 2001	Haleakala	NEAT	·	1.2 km	MPC · JPL
639967	2018 RS_{13}	—	October 1, 2013	Kitt Peak	Spacewatch	·	2.4 km	MPC · JPL
639968	2018 RQ_{15}	—	March 29, 2008	Kitt Peak	Spacewatch	BRG	2.0 km	MPC · JPL
639969	2018 RX_{16}	—	September 28, 2002	Palomar	NEAT	·	2.2 km	MPC · JPL
639970	2018 RC_{17}	—	August 3, 1999	Kitt Peak	Spacewatch	·	2.5 km	MPC · JPL
639971	2018 RD_{17}	—	July 5, 2014	Haleakala	Pan-STARRS 1	·	2.0 km	MPC · JPL
639972	2018 RL_{22}	—	April 1, 1995	Kitt Peak	Spacewatch	·	3.1 km	MPC · JPL
639973	2018 RO_{23}	—	January 28, 2007	Mount Lemmon	Mount Lemmon Survey	DOR	2.7 km	MPC · JPL
639974	2018 RB_{25}	—	November 14, 1999	Socorro	LINEAR	·	1.3 km	MPC · JPL
639975	2018 RF_{29}	—	April 21, 2011	Haleakala	Pan-STARRS 1	·	3.3 km	MPC · JPL
639976	2018 RF_{33}	—	November 29, 2000	Kitt Peak	Spacewatch	·	1.8 km	MPC · JPL
639977	2018 RV_{50}	—	September 12, 2018	Mount Lemmon	Mount Lemmon Survey	·	2.3 km	MPC · JPL
639978	2018 RD_{61}	—	September 12, 2018	Mount Lemmon	Mount Lemmon Survey	·	1.4 km	MPC · JPL
639979	2018 SV_{5}	—	August 15, 2013	Haleakala	Pan-STARRS 1	GAL	1.5 km	MPC · JPL
639980	2018 SM_{7}	—	August 9, 2013	Catalina	CSS	·	2.3 km	MPC · JPL
639981	2018 SZ_{13}	—	March 13, 2012	Mayhill-ISON	L. Elenin	EUN	1.2 km	MPC · JPL
639982	2018 SL_{20}	—	September 19, 2018	Haleakala	Pan-STARRS 2	·	1.5 km	MPC · JPL
639983	2018 TT_{8}	—	February 21, 2015	Mount Lemmon	Mount Lemmon Survey	·	2.7 km	MPC · JPL
639984	2018 TL_{9}	—	March 31, 2016	Mount Lemmon	Mount Lemmon Survey	·	2.1 km	MPC · JPL
639985	2018 TX_{12}	—	August 23, 2007	Kitt Peak	Spacewatch	·	1.4 km	MPC · JPL
639986	2018 TM_{13}	—	March 4, 2005	Mount Lemmon	Mount Lemmon Survey	EOS	1.9 km	MPC · JPL
639987	2018 TX_{13}	—	September 20, 1995	Kitt Peak	Spacewatch	·	2.9 km	MPC · JPL
639988	2018 TE_{25}	—	September 13, 2018	Mount Lemmon	Mount Lemmon Survey	·	1.9 km	MPC · JPL
639989	2018 TZ_{37}	—	October 2, 2018	Haleakala	Pan-STARRS 2	·	1.2 km	MPC · JPL
639990	2018 TD_{44}	—	August 12, 2013	Haleakala	Pan-STARRS 1	AGN	790 m	MPC · JPL
639991	2018 UE_{6}	—	August 17, 2012	Haleakala	Pan-STARRS 1	·	2.1 km	MPC · JPL
639992	2018 UX_{9}	—	September 11, 2007	Mount Lemmon	Mount Lemmon Survey	·	1.9 km	MPC · JPL
639993	2018 UQ_{10}	—	September 3, 2007	Mount Lemmon	Mount Lemmon Survey	·	2.3 km	MPC · JPL
639994	2018 UT_{27}	—	October 17, 2018	Haleakala	Pan-STARRS 2	H	410 m	MPC · JPL
639995	2018 UP_{34}	—	October 20, 2018	Mount Lemmon	Mount Lemmon Survey	·	1.6 km	MPC · JPL
639996	2018 VE_{10}	—	January 5, 2002	Cima Ekar	ADAS	JUN	1.3 km	MPC · JPL
639997	2018 VB_{17}	—	December 22, 2008	Mount Lemmon	Mount Lemmon Survey	·	2.2 km	MPC · JPL
639998	2018 VE_{19}	—	August 12, 2006	Palomar	NEAT	·	3.7 km	MPC · JPL
639999	2018 VH_{20}	—	March 27, 2011	Mount Lemmon	Mount Lemmon Survey	·	2.0 km	MPC · JPL
640000	2018 VO_{23}	—	August 23, 2007	Kitt Peak	Spacewatch	EOS	1.6 km	MPC · JPL

back to top

== Meaning of names ==
As minor planet discoveries are confirmed, they are given a permanent number by the IAU's Minor Planet Center (MPC), and the discoverers can then submit names for them, following the IAU's naming conventions. The list below concerns those minor planets in the specified number-range that have received names, and explains the meanings of those names.

Official naming citations of newly named small Solar System bodies are approved and published in a bulletin by IAU's Working Group for Small Bodies Nomenclature (WGSBN). Before May 2021, citations were published in MPC's Minor Planet Circulars for many decades. Recent citations can also be found on the JPL Small-Body Database (SBDB). Until his death in 2016, German astronomer Lutz D. Schmadel compiled these citations into the Dictionary of Minor Planet Names (DMP) and regularly updated the collection.

Based on Paul Herget's The Names of the Minor Planets, Schmadel also researched the unclear origin of numerous asteroids, most of which had been named prior to World War II. This article incorporates text from this source, which is in the public domain: SBDB New namings may only be added to this list below after official publication as the preannouncement of names is condemned. The WGSBN publishes a comprehensive guideline for the naming rules of non-cometary small Solar System bodies.

Named minor planet	Provisional	This minor planet was named for...	Ref · Catalog
639292 Szabózoltán	2017 BO_{77}	Zoltán Szabó (b. 1940), a geologist and chief engineer of the Manganese Ore Mine at Úrkút, Hungary for more than 40 years.	IAU · 639292
