= List of minor planets: 535001–536000 =

The following is a partial list of minor planets, running from minor-planet number 535001 through 536000, inclusive. The primary data for this and other partial lists is based on JPL's "Small-Body Orbital Elements" and data available from the Minor Planet Center. Critical list information is also provided by the MPC, unless otherwise specified from Lowell Observatory. A detailed description of the table's columns and additional sources are given on the main page including a complete list of every page in this series, and a statistical break-up on the dynamical classification of minor planets.

Also see the summary list of all named bodies in numerical and alphabetical order, and the corresponding naming citations for the number range of this particular list. New namings may only be added to this list after official publication, as the preannouncement of names is condemned by the Working Group for Small Bodies Nomenclature of the International Astronomical Union.

| Near-Earth obj. | MBA (inner) | MBA (outer) | Centaur |
| Mars-crosser | MBA (middle) | Jupiter trojan | Trans-Neptunian obj. |
| Unclassified |

== 535001–535100 ==
| Designation | | | Discovery | | | Properties | | Ref |
| Permanent | Provisional | Named after | Date | Site | Discoverer(s) | Category | Diam. | Ref |
|---|---|---|---|---|---|---|---|---|
| 535001 | 2014 WK_{481} | — | February 8, 2011 | Mount Lemmon | Mount Lemmon Survey | · | 1.1 km | MPC · JPL |
| 535002 | 2014 WH_{484} | — | November 22, 2006 | Mount Lemmon | Mount Lemmon Survey | · | 930 m | MPC · JPL |
| 535003 | 2014 WW_{485} | — | September 3, 2010 | Mount Lemmon | Mount Lemmon Survey | V | 550 m | MPC · JPL |
| 535004 | 2014 WQ_{487} | — | June 5, 2010 | WISE | WISE | · | 3.8 km | MPC · JPL |
| 535005 | 2014 WX_{489} | — | February 7, 2011 | La Sagra | OAM | · | 1.3 km | MPC · JPL |
| 535006 | 2014 WR_{491} | — | October 30, 2014 | Mount Lemmon | Mount Lemmon Survey | EUN | 1.3 km | MPC · JPL |
| 535007 | 2014 WW_{492} | — | September 29, 2009 | Mount Lemmon | Mount Lemmon Survey | · | 1.6 km | MPC · JPL |
| 535008 | 2014 WJ_{493} | — | September 23, 2009 | Mount Lemmon | Mount Lemmon Survey | · | 1.7 km | MPC · JPL |
| 535009 | 2014 WS_{493} | — | November 28, 2014 | Haleakala | Pan-STARRS 1 | BRA | 1.4 km | MPC · JPL |
| 535010 | 2014 WA_{494} | — | December 7, 2005 | Kitt Peak | Spacewatch | · | 1.2 km | MPC · JPL |
| 535011 | 2014 WP_{495} | — | October 15, 2013 | Mount Lemmon | Mount Lemmon Survey | · | 2.2 km | MPC · JPL |
| 535012 | 2014 WQ_{498} | — | September 10, 2010 | Kitt Peak | Spacewatch | · | 2.8 km | MPC · JPL |
| 535013 | 2014 WX_{498} | — | November 7, 2007 | Mount Lemmon | Mount Lemmon Survey | PHO | 1.0 km | MPC · JPL |
| 535014 | 2014 WQ_{504} | — | February 3, 2000 | Socorro | LINEAR | · | 1.0 km | MPC · JPL |
| 535015 | 2014 WW_{505} | — | January 8, 2010 | WISE | WISE | · | 3.0 km | MPC · JPL |
| 535016 | 2014 WD_{506} | — | August 31, 2014 | Haleakala | Pan-STARRS 1 | · | 1.1 km | MPC · JPL |
| 535017 | 2014 WY_{508} | — | November 29, 2014 | Haleakala | Pan-STARRS 1 | centaur | 168 km | MPC · JPL |
| 535018 | 2014 WA_{509} | — | November 29, 2014 | Haleakala | Pan-STARRS 1 | cubewano (cold) | 207 km | MPC · JPL |
| 535019 | 2014 WE_{509} | — | November 26, 2014 | Haleakala | Pan-STARRS 1 | res · 3:4 | 133 km | MPC · JPL |
| 535020 | 2014 WG_{509} | — | November 21, 2014 | Haleakala | Pan-STARRS 1 | cubewano (hot) | 326 km | MPC · JPL |
| 535021 | 2014 WL_{509} | — | November 23, 2014 | Haleakala | Pan-STARRS 1 | cubewano (hot) | 290 km | MPC · JPL |
| 535022 | 2014 WN_{509} | — | November 27, 2014 | Haleakala | Pan-STARRS 1 | res · 3:5 | 211 km | MPC · JPL |
| 535023 | 2014 WO_{509} | — | March 12, 2013 | Kitt Peak | Research and Education Collaborative Occultation Network | cubewano (cold) | 192 km | MPC · JPL |
| 535024 | 2014 WR_{509} | — | November 17, 2014 | Haleakala | Pan-STARRS 1 | plutino | 175 km | MPC · JPL |
| 535025 | 2014 WT_{509} | — | November 20, 2014 | Haleakala | Pan-STARRS 1 | twotino | 134 km | MPC · JPL |
| 535026 | 2014 WV_{509} | — | November 22, 2014 | Haleakala | Pan-STARRS 1 | cubewano (hot) | 214 km | MPC · JPL |
| 535027 | 2014 WY_{509} | — | November 27, 2014 | Haleakala | Pan-STARRS 1 | cubewano (hot) | 320 km | MPC · JPL |
| 535028 | 2014 WA_{510} | — | March 17, 2015 | Mauna Kea | D. J. Tholen, C. A. Trujillo, S. S. Sheppard | cubewano (cold) | 221 km | MPC · JPL |
| 535029 | 2014 WG_{510} | — | November 23, 2014 | Haleakala | Pan-STARRS 1 | plutino | 223 km | MPC · JPL |
| 535030 | 2014 WJ_{510} | — | November 25, 2014 | Haleakala | Pan-STARRS 1 | SDO | 175 km | MPC · JPL |
| 535031 | 2014 WL_{510} | — | November 26, 2014 | Haleakala | Pan-STARRS 1 | SDO | 190 km | MPC · JPL |
| 535032 | 2014 WP_{510} | — | November 27, 2014 | Haleakala | Pan-STARRS 1 | plutino | 163 km | MPC · JPL |
| 535033 | 2014 WN_{511} | — | April 12, 2010 | WISE | WISE | L5 | 10 km | MPC · JPL |
| 535034 | 2014 WN_{514} | — | December 4, 2005 | Kitt Peak | Spacewatch | · | 2.3 km | MPC · JPL |
| 535035 | 2014 WZ_{514} | — | December 5, 2005 | Kitt Peak | Spacewatch | EUN | 1.2 km | MPC · JPL |
| 535036 | 2014 WJ_{515} | — | October 1, 2010 | Kitt Peak | Spacewatch | · | 1.1 km | MPC · JPL |
| 535037 | 2014 WK_{515} | — | November 2, 2007 | Mount Lemmon | Mount Lemmon Survey | (2076) | 780 m | MPC · JPL |
| 535038 | 2014 WM_{515} | — | November 21, 2014 | Haleakala | Pan-STARRS 1 | · | 840 m | MPC · JPL |
| 535039 | 2014 WP_{515} | — | June 20, 2013 | Mount Lemmon | Mount Lemmon Survey | EUN | 1.3 km | MPC · JPL |
| 535040 | 2014 WR_{515} | — | January 19, 2012 | Kitt Peak | Spacewatch | · | 590 m | MPC · JPL |
| 535041 | 2014 WS_{515} | — | August 13, 2012 | Haleakala | Pan-STARRS 1 | · | 2.2 km | MPC · JPL |
| 535042 | 2014 WX_{515} | — | December 5, 2010 | Mount Lemmon | Mount Lemmon Survey | · | 2.0 km | MPC · JPL |
| 535043 | 2014 WA_{516} | — | September 24, 2009 | Mount Lemmon | Mount Lemmon Survey | · | 1.4 km | MPC · JPL |
| 535044 | 2014 WB_{516} | — | June 7, 2013 | Mount Lemmon | Mount Lemmon Survey | EUN | 1.2 km | MPC · JPL |
| 535045 | 2014 WC_{516} | — | July 9, 2013 | Haleakala | Pan-STARRS 1 | HNS | 1.3 km | MPC · JPL |
| 535046 | 2014 WD_{516} | — | May 20, 2005 | Mount Lemmon | Mount Lemmon Survey | · | 2.8 km | MPC · JPL |
| 535047 | 2014 WF_{516} | — | October 29, 2005 | Mount Lemmon | Mount Lemmon Survey | · | 1.5 km | MPC · JPL |
| 535048 | 2014 WJ_{516} | — | April 20, 2012 | Mount Lemmon | Mount Lemmon Survey | · | 1.7 km | MPC · JPL |
| 535049 | 2014 WK_{516} | — | October 25, 2005 | Mount Lemmon | Mount Lemmon Survey | · | 2.2 km | MPC · JPL |
| 535050 | 2014 WW_{516} | — | April 15, 2012 | Haleakala | Pan-STARRS 1 | (5) | 1.0 km | MPC · JPL |
| 535051 | 2014 WX_{516} | — | February 28, 2008 | Mount Lemmon | Mount Lemmon Survey | (5) | 980 m | MPC · JPL |
| 535052 | 2014 WZ_{516} | — | November 10, 2010 | Mount Lemmon | Mount Lemmon Survey | · | 790 m | MPC · JPL |
| 535053 | 2014 WB_{517} | — | November 22, 2014 | Haleakala | Pan-STARRS 1 | EUN | 1.1 km | MPC · JPL |
| 535054 | 2014 WC_{517} | — | October 28, 2010 | Mount Lemmon | Mount Lemmon Survey | · | 1.2 km | MPC · JPL |
| 535055 | 2014 WD_{517} | — | January 1, 2008 | Kitt Peak | Spacewatch | · | 1.1 km | MPC · JPL |
| 535056 | 2014 WE_{517} | — | December 14, 2010 | Mount Lemmon | Mount Lemmon Survey | · | 1.3 km | MPC · JPL |
| 535057 | 2014 WF_{517} | — | October 2, 2006 | Mount Lemmon | Mount Lemmon Survey | V | 620 m | MPC · JPL |
| 535058 | 2014 WG_{517} | — | January 27, 2011 | Mount Lemmon | Mount Lemmon Survey | MAR | 880 m | MPC · JPL |
| 535059 | 2014 WS_{517} | — | March 19, 2007 | Mount Lemmon | Mount Lemmon Survey | · | 2.3 km | MPC · JPL |
| 535060 | 2014 WV_{517} | — | November 26, 2013 | Mount Lemmon | Mount Lemmon Survey | EOS | 2.0 km | MPC · JPL |
| 535061 | 2014 WY_{517} | — | December 21, 2008 | Mount Lemmon | Mount Lemmon Survey | · | 2.8 km | MPC · JPL |
| 535062 | 2014 WF_{518} | — | May 14, 2008 | Mount Lemmon | Mount Lemmon Survey | · | 1.7 km | MPC · JPL |
| 535063 | 2014 WH_{518} | — | November 17, 2014 | Haleakala | Pan-STARRS 1 | · | 700 m | MPC · JPL |
| 535064 | 2014 WJ_{518} | — | October 17, 2010 | Mount Lemmon | Mount Lemmon Survey | · | 1.0 km | MPC · JPL |
| 535065 | 2014 WK_{518} | — | August 4, 2013 | Haleakala | Pan-STARRS 1 | · | 1.6 km | MPC · JPL |
| 535066 | 2014 WL_{518} | — | April 30, 2008 | Mount Lemmon | Mount Lemmon Survey | · | 1.2 km | MPC · JPL |
| 535067 | 2014 WM_{518} | — | January 3, 2011 | Mount Lemmon | Mount Lemmon Survey | · | 1.2 km | MPC · JPL |
| 535068 | 2014 WR_{518} | — | December 10, 2010 | Mount Lemmon | Mount Lemmon Survey | · | 1.2 km | MPC · JPL |
| 535069 | 2014 WS_{518} | — | June 11, 2010 | WISE | WISE | VER | 2.6 km | MPC · JPL |
| 535070 | 2014 WC_{520} | — | November 20, 2003 | Socorro | LINEAR | · | 1.9 km | MPC · JPL |
| 535071 | 2014 WU_{520} | — | January 7, 2006 | Mount Lemmon | Mount Lemmon Survey | HNS | 1.5 km | MPC · JPL |
| 535072 | 2014 WW_{520} | — | January 30, 2011 | Mount Lemmon | Mount Lemmon Survey | · | 1.5 km | MPC · JPL |
| 535073 | 2014 WY_{520} | — | September 20, 2009 | Mount Lemmon | Mount Lemmon Survey | · | 1.4 km | MPC · JPL |
| 535074 | 2014 WF_{521} | — | January 16, 2011 | Mount Lemmon | Mount Lemmon Survey | (5) | 940 m | MPC · JPL |
| 535075 | 2014 WH_{521} | — | August 30, 2005 | Kitt Peak | Spacewatch | · | 1.3 km | MPC · JPL |
| 535076 | 2014 WL_{521} | — | January 31, 2001 | Kitt Peak | Spacewatch | · | 870 m | MPC · JPL |
| 535077 | 2014 WQ_{521} | — | March 30, 2012 | Kitt Peak | Spacewatch | · | 1.2 km | MPC · JPL |
| 535078 | 2014 WT_{521} | — | October 9, 2005 | Kitt Peak | Spacewatch | (5) | 980 m | MPC · JPL |
| 535079 | 2014 WU_{521} | — | September 25, 2009 | Catalina | CSS | · | 1.8 km | MPC · JPL |
| 535080 | 2014 WX_{521} | — | January 10, 2011 | Mount Lemmon | Mount Lemmon Survey | · | 1.3 km | MPC · JPL |
| 535081 | 2014 WA_{522} | — | September 4, 2010 | Mount Lemmon | Mount Lemmon Survey | · | 750 m | MPC · JPL |
| 535082 | 2014 WB_{522} | — | September 20, 2009 | Kitt Peak | Spacewatch | KON | 2.3 km | MPC · JPL |
| 535083 | 2014 WK_{522} | — | October 7, 2013 | Mount Lemmon | Mount Lemmon Survey | · | 1.8 km | MPC · JPL |
| 535084 | 2014 WQ_{522} | — | April 30, 2003 | Kitt Peak | Spacewatch | HNS | 1.4 km | MPC · JPL |
| 535085 | 2014 WV_{523} | — | February 27, 2012 | Haleakala | Pan-STARRS 1 | · | 910 m | MPC · JPL |
| 535086 | 2014 WD_{524} | — | December 27, 2006 | Mount Lemmon | Mount Lemmon Survey | · | 1.1 km | MPC · JPL |
| 535087 | 2014 WL_{524} | — | November 17, 2014 | Haleakala | Pan-STARRS 1 | GEF | 1.1 km | MPC · JPL |
| 535088 | 2014 WB_{525} | — | June 7, 2013 | Haleakala | Pan-STARRS 1 | HNS | 780 m | MPC · JPL |
| 535089 | 2014 WM_{525} | — | November 20, 2014 | Haleakala | Pan-STARRS 1 | · | 1.0 km | MPC · JPL |
| 535090 | 2014 WN_{525} | — | July 14, 2013 | Haleakala | Pan-STARRS 1 | EUN | 940 m | MPC · JPL |
| 535091 | 2014 WV_{525} | — | November 20, 2014 | Haleakala | Pan-STARRS 1 | MAR | 810 m | MPC · JPL |
| 535092 | 2014 WK_{526} | — | February 17, 2007 | Mount Lemmon | Mount Lemmon Survey | · | 1.2 km | MPC · JPL |
| 535093 | 2014 WR_{526} | — | May 28, 2008 | Kitt Peak | Spacewatch | · | 1.6 km | MPC · JPL |
| 535094 | 2014 WV_{526} | — | August 31, 2005 | Kitt Peak | Spacewatch | · | 1.0 km | MPC · JPL |
| 535095 | 2014 WF_{527} | — | September 14, 2005 | Kitt Peak | Spacewatch | · | 1.1 km | MPC · JPL |
| 535096 | 2014 WH_{527} | — | November 21, 2014 | Haleakala | Pan-STARRS 1 | EUN | 930 m | MPC · JPL |
| 535097 | 2014 WL_{527} | — | September 14, 2013 | Haleakala | Pan-STARRS 1 | · | 2.1 km | MPC · JPL |
| 535098 | 2014 WP_{527} | — | November 21, 2014 | Haleakala | Pan-STARRS 1 | · | 1.9 km | MPC · JPL |
| 535099 | 2014 WZ_{527} | — | February 7, 2011 | Mount Lemmon | Mount Lemmon Survey | ADE | 1.4 km | MPC · JPL |
| 535100 | 2014 WH_{528} | — | February 26, 2008 | Mount Lemmon | Mount Lemmon Survey | · | 1.0 km | MPC · JPL |

== 535101–535200 ==
back to top

| Designation | | | Discovery | | | Properties | | Ref |
| Permanent | Provisional | Named after | Date | Site | Discoverer(s) | Category | Diam. | Ref |
|---|---|---|---|---|---|---|---|---|
| 535101 | 2014 WQ_{528} | — | February 8, 2011 | Mount Lemmon | Mount Lemmon Survey | · | 1.4 km | MPC · JPL |
| 535102 | 2014 WT_{528} | — | November 22, 2014 | Haleakala | Pan-STARRS 1 | · | 1.3 km | MPC · JPL |
| 535103 | 2014 WD_{529} | — | November 22, 2014 | Haleakala | Pan-STARRS 1 | MAR | 830 m | MPC · JPL |
| 535104 | 2014 WF_{529} | — | February 25, 2011 | Mount Lemmon | Mount Lemmon Survey | · | 1.6 km | MPC · JPL |
| 535105 | 2014 WT_{529} | — | November 23, 2014 | Haleakala | Pan-STARRS 1 | · | 630 m | MPC · JPL |
| 535106 | 2014 WV_{529} | — | November 23, 2014 | Mount Lemmon | Mount Lemmon Survey | EUN | 1.1 km | MPC · JPL |
| 535107 | 2014 WX_{529} | — | November 23, 2014 | Haleakala | Pan-STARRS 1 | · | 1.3 km | MPC · JPL |
| 535108 | 2014 WH_{530} | — | December 6, 2005 | Kitt Peak | Spacewatch | · | 1.7 km | MPC · JPL |
| 535109 | 2014 WT_{530} | — | April 14, 2008 | Mount Lemmon | Mount Lemmon Survey | MAR | 950 m | MPC · JPL |
| 535110 | 2014 WV_{530} | — | September 16, 2010 | Kitt Peak | Spacewatch | V | 490 m | MPC · JPL |
| 535111 | 2014 WZ_{530} | — | November 26, 2014 | Haleakala | Pan-STARRS 1 | (5) | 1.1 km | MPC · JPL |
| 535112 | 2014 WP_{531} | — | January 28, 2007 | Kitt Peak | Spacewatch | · | 1.5 km | MPC · JPL |
| 535113 | 2014 WV_{531} | — | March 9, 2011 | Mount Lemmon | Mount Lemmon Survey | · | 1.6 km | MPC · JPL |
| 535114 | 2014 WA_{532} | — | September 15, 2009 | Kitt Peak | Spacewatch | · | 1.3 km | MPC · JPL |
| 535115 | 2014 WD_{532} | — | November 26, 2014 | Haleakala | Pan-STARRS 1 | EUN | 1.2 km | MPC · JPL |
| 535116 | 2014 WH_{532} | — | July 1, 2013 | Haleakala | Pan-STARRS 1 | · | 1.5 km | MPC · JPL |
| 535117 | 2014 WM_{532} | — | November 30, 2010 | Mount Lemmon | Mount Lemmon Survey | · | 1.2 km | MPC · JPL |
| 535118 | 2014 WP_{532} | — | January 14, 2011 | Mount Lemmon | Mount Lemmon Survey | · | 1.9 km | MPC · JPL |
| 535119 | 2014 WR_{532} | — | November 27, 2014 | Mount Lemmon | Mount Lemmon Survey | MAR | 980 m | MPC · JPL |
| 535120 | 2014 WX_{532} | — | December 10, 2013 | Mount Lemmon | Mount Lemmon Survey | · | 3.3 km | MPC · JPL |
| 535121 | 2014 WY_{532} | — | November 27, 2014 | Haleakala | Pan-STARRS 1 | · | 1.8 km | MPC · JPL |
| 535122 | 2014 WZ_{532} | — | October 28, 2013 | Mount Lemmon | Mount Lemmon Survey | EOS | 1.6 km | MPC · JPL |
| 535123 | 2014 WC_{533} | — | November 27, 2014 | Haleakala | Pan-STARRS 1 | · | 1.8 km | MPC · JPL |
| 535124 | 2014 WD_{533} | — | November 28, 2014 | Kitt Peak | Spacewatch | · | 1.3 km | MPC · JPL |
| 535125 | 2014 WE_{533} | — | January 30, 2011 | Mount Lemmon | Mount Lemmon Survey | · | 1.1 km | MPC · JPL |
| 535126 | 2014 WT_{533} | — | March 27, 2011 | Mount Lemmon | Mount Lemmon Survey | JUN | 800 m | MPC · JPL |
| 535127 | 2014 WU_{533} | — | November 9, 2009 | Kitt Peak | Spacewatch | · | 1.4 km | MPC · JPL |
| 535128 | 2014 WV_{533} | — | November 29, 2014 | Mount Lemmon | Mount Lemmon Survey | · | 830 m | MPC · JPL |
| 535129 | 2014 WY_{533} | — | November 23, 2014 | Mount Lemmon | Mount Lemmon Survey | EUN | 1.2 km | MPC · JPL |
| 535130 | 2014 WC_{534} | — | December 14, 2006 | Mount Lemmon | Mount Lemmon Survey | · | 980 m | MPC · JPL |
| 535131 | 2014 WG_{534} | — | October 21, 2009 | Mount Lemmon | Mount Lemmon Survey | · | 1.5 km | MPC · JPL |
| 535132 | 2014 WH_{534} | — | February 28, 2008 | Mount Lemmon | Mount Lemmon Survey | · | 1.1 km | MPC · JPL |
| 535133 | 2014 WK_{534} | — | May 10, 2010 | WISE | WISE | T_{j} (2.98) | 5.3 km | MPC · JPL |
| 535134 | 2014 WM_{534} | — | January 6, 2006 | Kitt Peak | Spacewatch | HNS | 1.1 km | MPC · JPL |
| 535135 | 2014 WS_{534} | — | November 30, 2014 | Haleakala | Pan-STARRS 1 | · | 1.4 km | MPC · JPL |
| 535136 | 2014 WU_{534} | — | November 30, 2014 | Kitt Peak | Spacewatch | · | 2.0 km | MPC · JPL |
| 535137 | 2014 WY_{534} | — | November 30, 2014 | Haleakala | Pan-STARRS 1 | · | 1.8 km | MPC · JPL |
| 535138 | 2014 WF_{535} | — | November 23, 2014 | Mount Lemmon | Mount Lemmon Survey | · | 630 m | MPC · JPL |
| 535139 | 2014 WH_{535} | — | September 19, 2007 | Kitt Peak | Spacewatch | · | 560 m | MPC · JPL |
| 535140 | 2014 WJ_{535} | — | November 22, 2014 | Haleakala | Pan-STARRS 1 | PHO | 1.0 km | MPC · JPL |
| 535141 | 2014 WK_{535} | — | November 25, 2014 | Haleakala | Pan-STARRS 1 | · | 1.0 km | MPC · JPL |
| 535142 | 2014 WP_{535} | — | November 5, 1996 | Kitt Peak | Spacewatch | · | 1.0 km | MPC · JPL |
| 535143 | 2014 WQ_{535} | — | November 17, 2014 | Haleakala | Pan-STARRS 1 | · | 670 m | MPC · JPL |
| 535144 | 2014 XC | — | January 6, 2010 | Mount Lemmon | Mount Lemmon Survey | (40134) | 2.7 km | MPC · JPL |
| 535145 | 2014 XM_{4} | — | August 31, 2005 | Kitt Peak | Spacewatch | · | 1.2 km | MPC · JPL |
| 535146 | 2014 XU_{4} | — | October 29, 2014 | Catalina | CSS | · | 1.6 km | MPC · JPL |
| 535147 | 2014 XA_{5} | — | August 14, 2012 | Haleakala | Pan-STARRS 1 | L5 | 7.3 km | MPC · JPL |
| 535148 | 2014 XR_{6} | — | December 1, 2014 | Catalina | CSS | AMO | 860 m | MPC · JPL |
| 535149 | 2014 XJ_{8} | — | February 13, 2001 | Socorro | LINEAR | · | 1.0 km | MPC · JPL |
| 535150 | 2014 XB_{12} | — | November 16, 2014 | Mount Lemmon | Mount Lemmon Survey | · | 3.0 km | MPC · JPL |
| 535151 | 2014 XV_{17} | — | December 11, 2010 | Kitt Peak | Spacewatch | · | 1.1 km | MPC · JPL |
| 535152 | 2014 XM_{18} | — | February 7, 2007 | Kitt Peak | Spacewatch | · | 1.5 km | MPC · JPL |
| 535153 | 2014 XT_{20} | — | December 14, 2001 | Socorro | LINEAR | · | 1.2 km | MPC · JPL |
| 535154 | 2014 XZ_{25} | — | December 5, 2007 | Kitt Peak | Spacewatch | · | 580 m | MPC · JPL |
| 535155 | 2014 XH_{27} | — | November 19, 2014 | Haleakala | Pan-STARRS 1 | · | 580 m | MPC · JPL |
| 535156 | 2014 XS_{27} | — | December 17, 2007 | Kitt Peak | Spacewatch | NYS | 740 m | MPC · JPL |
| 535157 | 2014 XY_{30} | — | January 17, 2007 | Catalina | CSS | · | 1.3 km | MPC · JPL |
| 535158 | 2014 XZ_{30} | — | February 8, 2007 | Mount Lemmon | Mount Lemmon Survey | · | 1.9 km | MPC · JPL |
| 535159 | 2014 XL_{32} | — | August 31, 2014 | Haleakala | Pan-STARRS 1 | JUN | 700 m | MPC · JPL |
| 535160 | 2014 XF_{36} | — | July 31, 2005 | Socorro | LINEAR | · | 2.0 km | MPC · JPL |
| 535161 | 2014 XY_{36} | — | October 10, 2008 | Catalina | CSS | · | 2.7 km | MPC · JPL |
| 535162 | 2014 XF_{38} | — | December 15, 2014 | Mount Lemmon | Mount Lemmon Survey | · | 960 m | MPC · JPL |
| 535163 | 2014 XH_{39} | — | November 12, 2001 | Socorro | LINEAR | EUN | 1.3 km | MPC · JPL |
| 535164 | 2014 XJ_{39} | — | May 21, 2012 | Haleakala | Pan-STARRS 1 | · | 1.7 km | MPC · JPL |
| 535165 | 2014 XR_{39} | — | September 25, 2014 | Mount Lemmon | Mount Lemmon Survey | · | 1.3 km | MPC · JPL |
| 535166 | 2014 XY_{39} | — | October 26, 2014 | Mount Lemmon | Mount Lemmon Survey | L5 | 10 km | MPC · JPL |
| 535167 | 2014 XT_{40} | — | December 10, 2014 | Haleakala | Pan-STARRS 1 | plutino | 174 km | MPC · JPL |
| 535168 | 2014 XU_{40} | — | December 13, 2014 | Haleakala | Pan-STARRS 1 | plutino | 180 km | MPC · JPL |
| 535169 | 2014 XX_{40} | — | December 1, 2014 | Haleakala | Pan-STARRS 1 | SDO | 130 km | MPC · JPL |
| 535170 | 2014 XY_{41} | — | March 2, 2008 | Kitt Peak | Spacewatch | · | 1.3 km | MPC · JPL |
| 535171 | 2014 XD_{42} | — | March 9, 2011 | Mount Lemmon | Mount Lemmon Survey | · | 2.0 km | MPC · JPL |
| 535172 | 2014 XP_{42} | — | December 12, 2014 | Haleakala | Pan-STARRS 1 | · | 1.6 km | MPC · JPL |
| 535173 | 2014 XQ_{42} | — | December 13, 2006 | Kitt Peak | Spacewatch | · | 1.1 km | MPC · JPL |
| 535174 | 2014 XR_{42} | — | October 30, 2014 | Mount Lemmon | Mount Lemmon Survey | · | 1.3 km | MPC · JPL |
| 535175 | 2014 XS_{42} | — | September 23, 2013 | Mount Lemmon | Mount Lemmon Survey | · | 1.8 km | MPC · JPL |
| 535176 | 2014 XA_{43} | — | October 14, 2013 | Kitt Peak | Spacewatch | · | 2.7 km | MPC · JPL |
| 535177 | 2014 XJ_{43} | — | November 12, 2013 | Kitt Peak | Spacewatch | · | 3.4 km | MPC · JPL |
| 535178 | 2014 XK_{43} | — | March 26, 2011 | Mount Lemmon | Mount Lemmon Survey | · | 1.8 km | MPC · JPL |
| 535179 | 2014 XO_{43} | — | December 10, 2010 | Mount Lemmon | Mount Lemmon Survey | · | 1.6 km | MPC · JPL |
| 535180 | 2014 XP_{43} | — | December 10, 2014 | Mount Lemmon | Mount Lemmon Survey | HNS | 920 m | MPC · JPL |
| 535181 | 2014 XV_{43} | — | December 11, 2014 | Mount Lemmon | Mount Lemmon Survey | MAR | 930 m | MPC · JPL |
| 535182 | 2014 XZ_{43} | — | January 3, 2012 | Mount Lemmon | Mount Lemmon Survey | · | 550 m | MPC · JPL |
| 535183 | 2014 XB_{44} | — | December 12, 2014 | Haleakala | Pan-STARRS 1 | EUN | 950 m | MPC · JPL |
| 535184 | 2014 XD_{44} | — | December 6, 2005 | Kitt Peak | Spacewatch | · | 2.1 km | MPC · JPL |
| 535185 | 2014 XH_{44} | — | December 12, 2014 | Haleakala | Pan-STARRS 1 | · | 1.3 km | MPC · JPL |
| 535186 | 2014 YL_{3} | — | August 30, 2013 | Haleakala | Pan-STARRS 1 | MAR | 1.1 km | MPC · JPL |
| 535187 | 2014 YR_{3} | — | August 15, 2013 | Haleakala | Pan-STARRS 1 | · | 1.2 km | MPC · JPL |
| 535188 | 2014 YS_{4} | — | October 26, 2014 | Mount Lemmon | Mount Lemmon Survey | · | 1.6 km | MPC · JPL |
| 535189 | 2014 YH_{6} | — | December 10, 2010 | Mount Lemmon | Mount Lemmon Survey | (5) | 1.0 km | MPC · JPL |
| 535190 | 2014 YU_{6} | — | October 15, 2013 | Mount Lemmon | Mount Lemmon Survey | · | 1.9 km | MPC · JPL |
| 535191 | 2014 YX_{6} | — | October 27, 2005 | Kitt Peak | Spacewatch | · | 960 m | MPC · JPL |
| 535192 | 2014 YN_{7} | — | November 4, 2013 | Mount Lemmon | Mount Lemmon Survey | · | 1.8 km | MPC · JPL |
| 535193 | 2014 YR_{7} | — | December 11, 2009 | Mount Lemmon | Mount Lemmon Survey | · | 2.0 km | MPC · JPL |
| 535194 | 2014 YV_{7} | — | March 2, 2006 | Kitt Peak | Spacewatch | · | 1.6 km | MPC · JPL |
| 535195 | 2014 YY_{7} | — | January 1, 2008 | Kitt Peak | Spacewatch | · | 590 m | MPC · JPL |
| 535196 | 2014 YC_{8} | — | February 5, 2011 | Haleakala | Pan-STARRS 1 | ADE | 1.7 km | MPC · JPL |
| 535197 | 2014 YM_{8} | — | November 16, 2010 | Mount Lemmon | Mount Lemmon Survey | · | 1.4 km | MPC · JPL |
| 535198 | 2014 YJ_{10} | — | October 28, 2014 | Haleakala | Pan-STARRS 1 | · | 1.3 km | MPC · JPL |
| 535199 | 2014 YZ_{10} | — | October 14, 2010 | Mount Lemmon | Mount Lemmon Survey | EUN | 1.2 km | MPC · JPL |
| 535200 | 2014 YR_{11} | — | February 13, 2010 | Mount Lemmon | Mount Lemmon Survey | EOS | 2.5 km | MPC · JPL |

== 535201–535300 ==
back to top

| Designation | | | Discovery | | | Properties | | Ref |
| Permanent | Provisional | Named after | Date | Site | Discoverer(s) | Category | Diam. | Ref |
|---|---|---|---|---|---|---|---|---|
| 535201 | 2014 YB_{12} | — | November 15, 2006 | Mount Lemmon | Mount Lemmon Survey | · | 1.1 km | MPC · JPL |
| 535202 | 2014 YT_{12} | — | November 10, 2009 | Mount Lemmon | Mount Lemmon Survey | · | 1.8 km | MPC · JPL |
| 535203 | 2014 YJ_{15} | — | September 10, 2001 | Socorro | LINEAR | · | 2.0 km | MPC · JPL |
| 535204 | 2014 YF_{16} | — | December 18, 2009 | Mount Lemmon | Mount Lemmon Survey | · | 3.0 km | MPC · JPL |
| 535205 | 2014 YR_{18} | — | December 30, 2005 | Kitt Peak | Spacewatch | · | 2.2 km | MPC · JPL |
| 535206 | 2014 YM_{21} | — | November 8, 2010 | Mount Lemmon | Mount Lemmon Survey | · | 980 m | MPC · JPL |
| 535207 | 2014 YU_{21} | — | December 25, 2005 | Mount Lemmon | Mount Lemmon Survey | · | 2.2 km | MPC · JPL |
| 535208 | 2014 YQ_{23} | — | January 7, 1999 | Kitt Peak | Spacewatch | · | 3.0 km | MPC · JPL |
| 535209 | 2014 YV_{23} | — | December 21, 2003 | Kitt Peak | Spacewatch | TIR | 3.3 km | MPC · JPL |
| 535210 | 2014 YW_{23} | — | November 26, 2014 | Mount Lemmon | Mount Lemmon Survey | · | 1.3 km | MPC · JPL |
| 535211 | 2014 YD_{24} | — | November 15, 2010 | Mount Lemmon | Mount Lemmon Survey | · | 1.8 km | MPC · JPL |
| 535212 | 2014 YB_{28} | — | September 12, 2013 | Mount Lemmon | Mount Lemmon Survey | · | 1.6 km | MPC · JPL |
| 535213 | 2014 YZ_{28} | — | September 29, 1973 | Palomar | C. J. van Houten, I. van Houten-Groeneveld, T. Gehrels | · | 1.4 km | MPC · JPL |
| 535214 | 2014 YC_{29} | — | September 3, 2008 | Kitt Peak | Spacewatch | · | 2.2 km | MPC · JPL |
| 535215 | 2014 YY_{30} | — | September 29, 2005 | Kitt Peak | Spacewatch | · | 1.1 km | MPC · JPL |
| 535216 | 2014 YH_{31} | — | October 24, 2009 | Kitt Peak | Spacewatch | · | 1.8 km | MPC · JPL |
| 535217 | 2014 YN_{32} | — | January 10, 2011 | Mount Lemmon | Mount Lemmon Survey | RAF | 830 m | MPC · JPL |
| 535218 | 2014 YK_{38} | — | January 1, 2008 | Kitt Peak | Spacewatch | · | 750 m | MPC · JPL |
| 535219 | 2014 YX_{42} | — | October 14, 2009 | Mount Lemmon | Mount Lemmon Survey | · | 2.2 km | MPC · JPL |
| 535220 | 2014 YC_{43} | — | December 18, 2014 | Haleakala | Pan-STARRS 1 | · | 1.2 km | MPC · JPL |
| 535221 | 2014 YN_{44} | — | December 29, 2014 | Haleakala | Pan-STARRS 1 | AMO | 550 m | MPC · JPL |
| 535222 | 2014 YZ_{44} | — | December 21, 2006 | Mount Lemmon | Mount Lemmon Survey | · | 1.0 km | MPC · JPL |
| 535223 | 2014 YL_{45} | — | April 8, 2008 | Mount Lemmon | Mount Lemmon Survey | · | 1.4 km | MPC · JPL |
| 535224 | 2014 YR_{46} | — | January 13, 2011 | Catalina | CSS | · | 1.2 km | MPC · JPL |
| 535225 | 2014 YH_{47} | — | November 6, 2005 | Mount Lemmon | Mount Lemmon Survey | · | 1.8 km | MPC · JPL |
| 535226 | 2014 YV_{47} | — | October 11, 2010 | Kitt Peak | Spacewatch | · | 3.5 km | MPC · JPL |
| 535227 | 2014 YS_{49} | — | March 26, 2007 | Kitt Peak | Spacewatch | · | 2.2 km | MPC · JPL |
| 535228 | 2014 YE_{50} | — | December 21, 2014 | Haleakala | Pan-STARRS 1 | SDO | 304 km | MPC · JPL |
| 535229 | 2014 YG_{50} | — | December 26, 2014 | Haleakala | Pan-STARRS 1 | plutino | 175 km | MPC · JPL |
| 535230 | 2014 YH_{50} | — | December 26, 2014 | Haleakala | Pan-STARRS 1 | SDO | 215 km | MPC · JPL |
| 535231 | 2014 YJ_{50} | — | December 29, 2014 | Haleakala | Pan-STARRS 1 | plutino | 210 km | MPC · JPL |
| 535232 | 2014 YO_{51} | — | November 22, 2014 | Mount Lemmon | Mount Lemmon Survey | · | 1.9 km | MPC · JPL |
| 535233 | 2014 YO_{53} | — | March 4, 2005 | Mount Lemmon | Mount Lemmon Survey | EOS | 2.0 km | MPC · JPL |
| 535234 | 2014 YP_{53} | — | March 17, 2005 | Mount Lemmon | Mount Lemmon Survey | · | 3.3 km | MPC · JPL |
| 535235 | 2014 YQ_{53} | — | January 30, 2011 | Kitt Peak | Spacewatch | · | 1.8 km | MPC · JPL |
| 535236 | 2014 YT_{53} | — | December 29, 2014 | Haleakala | Pan-STARRS 1 | · | 2.1 km | MPC · JPL |
| 535237 | 2014 YY_{53} | — | April 27, 2012 | Haleakala | Pan-STARRS 1 | · | 1.2 km | MPC · JPL |
| 535238 | 2014 YA_{54} | — | October 7, 2004 | Anderson Mesa | LONEOS | · | 2.4 km | MPC · JPL |
| 535239 | 2014 YE_{54} | — | March 12, 2010 | WISE | WISE | · | 3.6 km | MPC · JPL |
| 535240 | 2014 YG_{54} | — | December 24, 2014 | Mount Lemmon | Mount Lemmon Survey | HNS | 1.1 km | MPC · JPL |
| 535241 | 2014 YK_{54} | — | November 22, 2006 | Mount Lemmon | Mount Lemmon Survey | EUN | 1.1 km | MPC · JPL |
| 535242 | 2014 YM_{54} | — | November 11, 2006 | Mount Lemmon | Mount Lemmon Survey | NYS | 1.1 km | MPC · JPL |
| 535243 | 2014 YN_{54} | — | November 19, 2014 | Mount Lemmon | Mount Lemmon Survey | · | 1.1 km | MPC · JPL |
| 535244 | 2014 YO_{54} | — | December 29, 2014 | Haleakala | Pan-STARRS 1 | MAR | 870 m | MPC · JPL |
| 535245 | 2014 YP_{54} | — | January 8, 2011 | Mount Lemmon | Mount Lemmon Survey | · | 1.6 km | MPC · JPL |
| 535246 | 2014 YQ_{54} | — | March 15, 2008 | Kitt Peak | Spacewatch | · | 1.4 km | MPC · JPL |
| 535247 | 2014 YR_{54} | — | January 13, 2011 | Kitt Peak | Spacewatch | · | 1.8 km | MPC · JPL |
| 535248 | 2014 YU_{54} | — | March 25, 2007 | Mount Lemmon | Mount Lemmon Survey | · | 2.2 km | MPC · JPL |
| 535249 | 2014 YW_{54} | — | March 10, 2007 | Mount Lemmon | Mount Lemmon Survey | · | 1.7 km | MPC · JPL |
| 535250 | 2014 YA_{55} | — | April 25, 2007 | Mount Lemmon | Mount Lemmon Survey | EUN | 1.0 km | MPC · JPL |
| 535251 | 2014 YD_{55} | — | April 9, 2010 | Mount Lemmon | Mount Lemmon Survey | EOS | 1.9 km | MPC · JPL |
| 535252 | 2014 YG_{55} | — | April 15, 2008 | Mount Lemmon | Mount Lemmon Survey | · | 910 m | MPC · JPL |
| 535253 | 2014 YK_{55} | — | April 27, 2012 | Mount Lemmon | Mount Lemmon Survey | · | 1.4 km | MPC · JPL |
| 535254 | 2014 YM_{55} | — | October 11, 2010 | Mount Lemmon | Mount Lemmon Survey | · | 1.0 km | MPC · JPL |
| 535255 | 2014 YN_{55} | — | January 30, 2008 | Mount Lemmon | Mount Lemmon Survey | · | 1.2 km | MPC · JPL |
| 535256 | 2014 YP_{55} | — | October 13, 2010 | Mount Lemmon | Mount Lemmon Survey | · | 610 m | MPC · JPL |
| 535257 | 2014 YU_{55} | — | September 6, 2008 | Mount Lemmon | Mount Lemmon Survey | KOR | 920 m | MPC · JPL |
| 535258 | 2014 YW_{55} | — | January 14, 2015 | Haleakala | Pan-STARRS 1 | GEF | 1.2 km | MPC · JPL |
| 535259 | 2014 YJ_{56} | — | November 27, 2013 | Haleakala | Pan-STARRS 1 | EOS | 1.6 km | MPC · JPL |
| 535260 | 2014 YK_{56} | — | October 4, 2013 | Mount Lemmon | Mount Lemmon Survey | BRA | 1.4 km | MPC · JPL |
| 535261 | 2014 YP_{56} | — | September 22, 2009 | Mount Lemmon | Mount Lemmon Survey | HNS | 1.2 km | MPC · JPL |
| 535262 | 2014 YV_{56} | — | August 13, 2004 | Cerro Tololo | Deep Ecliptic Survey | · | 1.6 km | MPC · JPL |
| 535263 | 2014 YW_{56} | — | October 23, 2009 | Kitt Peak | Spacewatch | · | 1.7 km | MPC · JPL |
| 535264 | 2014 YX_{56} | — | September 3, 2013 | Haleakala | Pan-STARRS 1 | · | 820 m | MPC · JPL |
| 535265 | 2014 YC_{57} | — | August 7, 2013 | Haleakala | Pan-STARRS 1 | · | 2.4 km | MPC · JPL |
| 535266 Chorzów | 2014 YE_{57} | Chorzów | September 2, 2013 | Tincana | M. Kusiak, M. Żołnowski | · | 1.9 km | MPC · JPL |
| 535267 | 2014 YG_{57} | — | September 19, 2009 | Kitt Peak | Spacewatch | · | 1.0 km | MPC · JPL |
| 535268 | 2014 YH_{57} | — | October 21, 2003 | Kitt Peak | Spacewatch | · | 780 m | MPC · JPL |
| 535269 | 2014 YL_{57} | — | September 27, 2003 | Kitt Peak | Spacewatch | · | 1.9 km | MPC · JPL |
| 535270 | 2014 YN_{57} | — | March 4, 2011 | Kitt Peak | Spacewatch | (12739) | 1.5 km | MPC · JPL |
| 535271 | 2014 YO_{57} | — | February 12, 2011 | Mount Lemmon | Mount Lemmon Survey | · | 1.4 km | MPC · JPL |
| 535272 | 2014 YP_{57} | — | January 6, 2010 | Mount Lemmon | Mount Lemmon Survey | · | 2.1 km | MPC · JPL |
| 535273 | 2014 YR_{57} | — | November 12, 2010 | Mount Lemmon | Mount Lemmon Survey | · | 750 m | MPC · JPL |
| 535274 | 2014 YT_{57} | — | October 9, 2008 | Mount Lemmon | Mount Lemmon Survey | NAE | 2.3 km | MPC · JPL |
| 535275 | 2014 YE_{58} | — | February 4, 2006 | Kitt Peak | Spacewatch | · | 1.9 km | MPC · JPL |
| 535276 | 2014 YG_{58} | — | October 23, 2008 | Kitt Peak | Spacewatch | EOS | 2.0 km | MPC · JPL |
| 535277 | 2014 YM_{58} | — | December 21, 2014 | Mount Lemmon | Mount Lemmon Survey | · | 1.5 km | MPC · JPL |
| 535278 | 2014 YN_{58} | — | September 2, 2013 | Mount Lemmon | Mount Lemmon Survey | · | 1.3 km | MPC · JPL |
| 535279 | 2014 YR_{58} | — | December 21, 2014 | Mount Lemmon | Mount Lemmon Survey | · | 2.8 km | MPC · JPL |
| 535280 | 2014 YW_{58} | — | November 22, 2008 | Mount Lemmon | Mount Lemmon Survey | · | 2.2 km | MPC · JPL |
| 535281 | 2014 YM_{59} | — | January 23, 2006 | Kitt Peak | Spacewatch | · | 1.1 km | MPC · JPL |
| 535282 | 2014 YW_{59} | — | November 1, 2006 | Kitt Peak | Spacewatch | · | 780 m | MPC · JPL |
| 535283 | 2014 YD_{60} | — | April 19, 2012 | Kitt Peak | Spacewatch | V | 610 m | MPC · JPL |
| 535284 | 2014 YF_{60} | — | September 4, 2008 | Kitt Peak | Spacewatch | KOR | 1.2 km | MPC · JPL |
| 535285 | 2014 YY_{60} | — | January 27, 2007 | Kitt Peak | Spacewatch | · | 910 m | MPC · JPL |
| 535286 | 2014 YD_{61} | — | September 3, 2008 | Kitt Peak | Spacewatch | AGN | 1.0 km | MPC · JPL |
| 535287 | 2014 YN_{61} | — | October 28, 2005 | Mount Lemmon | Mount Lemmon Survey | · | 1.1 km | MPC · JPL |
| 535288 | 2014 YP_{61} | — | December 26, 2014 | Haleakala | Pan-STARRS 1 | · | 1.9 km | MPC · JPL |
| 535289 | 2014 YS_{61} | — | December 26, 2014 | Haleakala | Pan-STARRS 1 | HNS | 1.1 km | MPC · JPL |
| 535290 | 2014 YY_{61} | — | November 22, 2005 | Kitt Peak | Spacewatch | · | 1.2 km | MPC · JPL |
| 535291 | 2014 YZ_{61} | — | November 19, 2014 | Mount Lemmon | Mount Lemmon Survey | · | 620 m | MPC · JPL |
| 535292 | 2014 YJ_{62} | — | September 10, 2013 | Haleakala | Pan-STARRS 1 | · | 1.7 km | MPC · JPL |
| 535293 | 2014 YN_{62} | — | December 20, 2014 | Kitt Peak | Spacewatch | · | 1.4 km | MPC · JPL |
| 535294 | 2014 YW_{62} | — | October 2, 2013 | Haleakala | Pan-STARRS 1 | · | 1.7 km | MPC · JPL |
| 535295 | 2014 YX_{62} | — | December 29, 2014 | Haleakala | Pan-STARRS 1 | · | 1.8 km | MPC · JPL |
| 535296 | 2014 YE_{63} | — | December 29, 2014 | Haleakala | Pan-STARRS 1 | · | 2.9 km | MPC · JPL |
| 535297 | 2014 YH_{63} | — | December 29, 2014 | Haleakala | Pan-STARRS 1 | (21885) | 2.7 km | MPC · JPL |
| 535298 | 2014 YJ_{63} | — | December 29, 2014 | Haleakala | Pan-STARRS 1 | · | 2.4 km | MPC · JPL |
| 535299 | 2014 YK_{63} | — | February 5, 2011 | Mount Lemmon | Mount Lemmon Survey | · | 1.2 km | MPC · JPL |
| 535300 | 2014 YP_{63} | — | December 29, 2014 | Haleakala | Pan-STARRS 1 | · | 930 m | MPC · JPL |

== 535301–535400 ==
back to top

| Designation | | | Discovery | | | Properties | | Ref |
| Permanent | Provisional | Named after | Date | Site | Discoverer(s) | Category | Diam. | Ref |
|---|---|---|---|---|---|---|---|---|
| 535301 | 2014 YQ_{63} | — | April 9, 2010 | Mount Lemmon | Mount Lemmon Survey | ARM | 3.3 km | MPC · JPL |
| 535302 | 2014 YV_{63} | — | January 14, 2010 | WISE | WISE | · | 3.6 km | MPC · JPL |
| 535303 | 2014 YB_{64} | — | December 29, 2014 | Haleakala | Pan-STARRS 1 | · | 2.2 km | MPC · JPL |
| 535304 | 2014 YJ_{64} | — | December 29, 2014 | Mount Lemmon | Mount Lemmon Survey | · | 2.0 km | MPC · JPL |
| 535305 | 2014 YK_{64} | — | February 10, 2010 | Kitt Peak | Spacewatch | · | 3.0 km | MPC · JPL |
| 535306 | 2015 AV | — | August 31, 2014 | Haleakala | Pan-STARRS 1 | EUN | 1.0 km | MPC · JPL |
| 535307 | 2015 AB_{1} | — | October 27, 2014 | Haleakala | Pan-STARRS 1 | HNS | 1.3 km | MPC · JPL |
| 535308 | 2015 AC_{2} | — | May 14, 2008 | Kitt Peak | Spacewatch | L5 | 10 km | MPC · JPL |
| 535309 | 2015 AH_{2} | — | November 23, 2014 | Haleakala | Pan-STARRS 1 | MAR | 860 m | MPC · JPL |
| 535310 | 2015 AR_{2} | — | September 14, 2013 | Haleakala | Pan-STARRS 1 | · | 2.1 km | MPC · JPL |
| 535311 | 2015 AN_{5} | — | January 10, 2007 | Mount Lemmon | Mount Lemmon Survey | EUN | 930 m | MPC · JPL |
| 535312 | 2015 AW_{5} | — | September 20, 2014 | Haleakala | Pan-STARRS 1 | V | 500 m | MPC · JPL |
| 535313 | 2015 AO_{6} | — | March 16, 2012 | Mount Lemmon | Mount Lemmon Survey | · | 1.4 km | MPC · JPL |
| 535314 | 2015 AK_{10} | — | April 7, 2005 | Mount Lemmon | Mount Lemmon Survey | · | 3.1 km | MPC · JPL |
| 535315 | 2015 AL_{10} | — | July 31, 2009 | Siding Spring | SSS | · | 1.7 km | MPC · JPL |
| 535316 | 2015 AV_{10} | — | November 23, 2009 | Mount Lemmon | Mount Lemmon Survey | · | 1.7 km | MPC · JPL |
| 535317 | 2015 AZ_{10} | — | September 25, 2009 | Kitt Peak | Spacewatch | JUN | 830 m | MPC · JPL |
| 535318 | 2015 AS_{12} | — | December 5, 2005 | Kitt Peak | Spacewatch | HNS | 1.2 km | MPC · JPL |
| 535319 | 2015 AD_{14} | — | May 22, 2010 | WISE | WISE | URS | 5.3 km | MPC · JPL |
| 535320 | 2015 AE_{14} | — | November 8, 2009 | Catalina | CSS | · | 1.8 km | MPC · JPL |
| 535321 | 2015 AN_{14} | — | November 21, 2014 | Haleakala | Pan-STARRS 1 | · | 1.4 km | MPC · JPL |
| 535322 | 2015 AQ_{16} | — | September 17, 2009 | Kitt Peak | Spacewatch | · | 1.7 km | MPC · JPL |
| 535323 | 2015 AR_{16} | — | December 26, 2014 | Haleakala | Pan-STARRS 1 | PHO | 960 m | MPC · JPL |
| 535324 | 2015 AH_{17} | — | February 22, 2007 | Kitt Peak | Spacewatch | · | 1.4 km | MPC · JPL |
| 535325 | 2015 AA_{18} | — | May 30, 2008 | Kitt Peak | Spacewatch | · | 1.7 km | MPC · JPL |
| 535326 | 2015 AK_{18} | — | November 28, 2014 | Mount Lemmon | Mount Lemmon Survey | · | 1.1 km | MPC · JPL |
| 535327 | 2015 AZ_{19} | — | December 17, 2006 | Mount Lemmon | Mount Lemmon Survey | · | 1.2 km | MPC · JPL |
| 535328 | 2015 AF_{20} | — | October 5, 2014 | Mount Lemmon | Mount Lemmon Survey | HNS | 1.2 km | MPC · JPL |
| 535329 | 2015 AG_{29} | — | November 29, 2013 | Haleakala | Pan-STARRS 1 | · | 2.0 km | MPC · JPL |
| 535330 | 2015 AW_{30} | — | November 29, 2014 | Haleakala | Pan-STARRS 1 | · | 1.3 km | MPC · JPL |
| 535331 | 2015 AD_{34} | — | March 28, 2008 | Mount Lemmon | Mount Lemmon Survey | MAS | 600 m | MPC · JPL |
| 535332 | 2015 AZ_{34} | — | December 25, 2005 | Mount Lemmon | Mount Lemmon Survey | · | 1.8 km | MPC · JPL |
| 535333 | 2015 AX_{35} | — | October 28, 2014 | Haleakala | Pan-STARRS 1 | · | 2.1 km | MPC · JPL |
| 535334 | 2015 AO_{37} | — | March 3, 2006 | Mount Lemmon | Mount Lemmon Survey | KOR | 1.3 km | MPC · JPL |
| 535335 | 2015 AQ_{38} | — | January 8, 2011 | Mount Lemmon | Mount Lemmon Survey | · | 1.8 km | MPC · JPL |
| 535336 | 2015 AL_{39} | — | December 21, 2014 | Haleakala | Pan-STARRS 1 | KOR | 1 km | MPC · JPL |
| 535337 | 2015 AR_{39} | — | December 21, 2014 | Haleakala | Pan-STARRS 1 | EOS | 1.8 km | MPC · JPL |
| 535338 | 2015 AP_{40} | — | November 10, 2009 | Kitt Peak | Spacewatch | · | 1.3 km | MPC · JPL |
| 535339 | 2015 AB_{41} | — | January 4, 2006 | Kitt Peak | Spacewatch | · | 2.2 km | MPC · JPL |
| 535340 | 2015 AF_{41} | — | January 26, 2007 | Kitt Peak | Spacewatch | · | 810 m | MPC · JPL |
| 535341 | 2015 AH_{41} | — | November 10, 2010 | Catalina | CSS | ERI | 1.1 km | MPC · JPL |
| 535342 | 2015 AF_{49} | — | November 4, 2014 | Haleakala | Pan-STARRS 1 | · | 1.3 km | MPC · JPL |
| 535343 | 2015 AX_{49} | — | October 3, 2005 | Kitt Peak | Spacewatch | · | 1.2 km | MPC · JPL |
| 535344 | 2015 AV_{52} | — | March 3, 2000 | Kitt Peak | Spacewatch | MAS | 640 m | MPC · JPL |
| 535345 | 2015 AX_{52} | — | December 19, 2001 | Kitt Peak | Spacewatch | · | 1.1 km | MPC · JPL |
| 535346 | 2015 AC_{59} | — | November 19, 2009 | Mount Lemmon | Mount Lemmon Survey | · | 1.6 km | MPC · JPL |
| 535347 | 2015 AX_{59} | — | November 17, 2009 | Kitt Peak | Spacewatch | · | 1.7 km | MPC · JPL |
| 535348 | 2015 AZ_{62} | — | January 2, 2006 | Mount Lemmon | Mount Lemmon Survey | · | 1.8 km | MPC · JPL |
| 535349 | 2015 AO_{63} | — | July 14, 2013 | Haleakala | Pan-STARRS 1 | · | 990 m | MPC · JPL |
| 535350 | 2015 AW_{64} | — | December 1, 2008 | Mount Lemmon | Mount Lemmon Survey | · | 3.2 km | MPC · JPL |
| 535351 | 2015 AQ_{67} | — | October 20, 2006 | Mount Lemmon | Mount Lemmon Survey | · | 1.1 km | MPC · JPL |
| 535352 | 2015 AL_{68} | — | February 15, 2010 | Mount Lemmon | Mount Lemmon Survey | · | 4.2 km | MPC · JPL |
| 535353 Antoniwilk | 2015 AP_{68} | Antoniwilk | April 11, 2007 | Catalina | CSS | · | 1.5 km | MPC · JPL |
| 535354 | 2015 AA_{69} | — | January 6, 2000 | Kitt Peak | Spacewatch | · | 2.5 km | MPC · JPL |
| 535355 | 2015 AK_{70} | — | December 25, 2005 | Kitt Peak | Spacewatch | · | 1.3 km | MPC · JPL |
| 535356 | 2015 AU_{73} | — | January 23, 2006 | Mount Lemmon | Mount Lemmon Survey | AGN | 1.2 km | MPC · JPL |
| 535357 | 2015 AV_{75} | — | September 3, 2013 | Mount Lemmon | Mount Lemmon Survey | · | 1.3 km | MPC · JPL |
| 535358 | 2015 AH_{76} | — | July 15, 2013 | Haleakala | Pan-STARRS 1 | EUN | 1.0 km | MPC · JPL |
| 535359 | 2015 AR_{79} | — | May 24, 2011 | Haleakala | Pan-STARRS 1 | EOS | 1.9 km | MPC · JPL |
| 535360 | 2015 AQ_{80} | — | August 20, 2004 | Kitt Peak | Spacewatch | · | 1.6 km | MPC · JPL |
| 535361 | 2015 AG_{81} | — | January 13, 2015 | Haleakala | Pan-STARRS 1 | HNS | 880 m | MPC · JPL |
| 535362 | 2015 AS_{85} | — | December 21, 2014 | Haleakala | Pan-STARRS 1 | MAS | 540 m | MPC · JPL |
| 535363 | 2015 AU_{85} | — | January 27, 2011 | Mount Lemmon | Mount Lemmon Survey | · | 840 m | MPC · JPL |
| 535364 | 2015 AZ_{85} | — | January 25, 2007 | Kitt Peak | Spacewatch | · | 990 m | MPC · JPL |
| 535365 | 2015 AF_{94} | — | November 30, 2014 | Haleakala | Pan-STARRS 1 | · | 2.5 km | MPC · JPL |
| 535366 | 2015 AW_{97} | — | December 27, 2014 | Haleakala | Pan-STARRS 1 | MAR | 1.1 km | MPC · JPL |
| 535367 | 2015 AM_{102} | — | January 14, 2015 | Haleakala | Pan-STARRS 1 | · | 770 m | MPC · JPL |
| 535368 | 2015 AL_{106} | — | September 14, 2013 | Haleakala | Pan-STARRS 1 | · | 1.8 km | MPC · JPL |
| 535369 | 2015 AX_{107} | — | December 21, 2014 | Mount Lemmon | Mount Lemmon Survey | EOS | 1.6 km | MPC · JPL |
| 535370 | 2015 AQ_{110} | — | February 2, 2005 | Kitt Peak | Spacewatch | · | 1.7 km | MPC · JPL |
| 535371 | 2015 AG_{111} | — | December 21, 2014 | Mount Lemmon | Mount Lemmon Survey | EOS | 1.9 km | MPC · JPL |
| 535372 | 2015 AW_{111} | — | January 8, 2006 | Mount Lemmon | Mount Lemmon Survey | · | 2.0 km | MPC · JPL |
| 535373 | 2015 AC_{121} | — | July 18, 2013 | Haleakala | Pan-STARRS 1 | · | 3.5 km | MPC · JPL |
| 535374 | 2015 AY_{121} | — | January 30, 2006 | Kitt Peak | Spacewatch | · | 1.7 km | MPC · JPL |
| 535375 | 2015 AG_{123} | — | May 7, 2011 | Kitt Peak | Spacewatch | · | 1.8 km | MPC · JPL |
| 535376 | 2015 AX_{126} | — | October 4, 2013 | Mount Lemmon | Mount Lemmon Survey | · | 1.2 km | MPC · JPL |
| 535377 | 2015 AP_{131} | — | May 11, 2007 | Mount Lemmon | Mount Lemmon Survey | AST | 1.8 km | MPC · JPL |
| 535378 | 2015 AW_{131} | — | January 14, 2015 | Haleakala | Pan-STARRS 1 | · | 2.3 km | MPC · JPL |
| 535379 | 2015 AX_{132} | — | September 6, 2008 | Mount Lemmon | Mount Lemmon Survey | KOR | 1.3 km | MPC · JPL |
| 535380 | 2015 AG_{133} | — | October 2, 2013 | Haleakala | Pan-STARRS 1 | · | 2.2 km | MPC · JPL |
| 535381 | 2015 AZ_{135} | — | November 20, 2009 | Kitt Peak | Spacewatch | · | 1.4 km | MPC · JPL |
| 535382 | 2015 AK_{138} | — | December 21, 2014 | Haleakala | Pan-STARRS 1 | · | 3.3 km | MPC · JPL |
| 535383 | 2015 AE_{146} | — | February 10, 2010 | Kitt Peak | Spacewatch | EOS | 2.0 km | MPC · JPL |
| 535384 | 2015 AO_{149} | — | October 29, 2003 | Kitt Peak | Spacewatch | · | 630 m | MPC · JPL |
| 535385 | 2015 AP_{151} | — | December 3, 2010 | Mount Lemmon | Mount Lemmon Survey | MAS | 520 m | MPC · JPL |
| 535386 | 2015 AZ_{151} | — | December 21, 2014 | Haleakala | Pan-STARRS 1 | · | 1.2 km | MPC · JPL |
| 535387 | 2015 AC_{152} | — | March 5, 2011 | Catalina | CSS | · | 1.9 km | MPC · JPL |
| 535388 | 2015 AV_{152} | — | January 31, 2004 | Kitt Peak | Spacewatch | NYS | 760 m | MPC · JPL |
| 535389 | 2015 AM_{154} | — | August 26, 2012 | Haleakala | Pan-STARRS 1 | · | 2.7 km | MPC · JPL |
| 535390 | 2015 AR_{155} | — | November 2, 2013 | Mount Lemmon | Mount Lemmon Survey | · | 2.8 km | MPC · JPL |
| 535391 | 2015 AP_{157} | — | August 21, 2008 | Kitt Peak | Spacewatch | · | 1.5 km | MPC · JPL |
| 535392 | 2015 AF_{162} | — | January 14, 2015 | Haleakala | Pan-STARRS 1 | NYS | 660 m | MPC · JPL |
| 535393 | 2015 AP_{162} | — | March 10, 2007 | Mount Lemmon | Mount Lemmon Survey | · | 860 m | MPC · JPL |
| 535394 | 2015 AJ_{166} | — | March 27, 2011 | Mount Lemmon | Mount Lemmon Survey | · | 1.6 km | MPC · JPL |
| 535395 | 2015 AB_{168} | — | February 8, 2008 | Kitt Peak | Spacewatch | · | 680 m | MPC · JPL |
| 535396 | 2015 AO_{169} | — | May 4, 2008 | Kitt Peak | Spacewatch | · | 1.0 km | MPC · JPL |
| 535397 | 2015 AK_{174} | — | September 18, 2006 | Kitt Peak | Spacewatch | (2076) | 650 m | MPC · JPL |
| 535398 | 2015 AE_{176} | — | October 20, 2007 | Mount Lemmon | Mount Lemmon Survey | · | 620 m | MPC · JPL |
| 535399 | 2015 AU_{176} | — | August 28, 2009 | La Sagra | OAM | · | 1.2 km | MPC · JPL |
| 535400 | 2015 AG_{177} | — | August 10, 2007 | Kitt Peak | Spacewatch | · | 2.8 km | MPC · JPL |

== 535401–535500 ==
back to top

| Designation | | | Discovery | | | Properties | | Ref |
| Permanent | Provisional | Named after | Date | Site | Discoverer(s) | Category | Diam. | Ref |
|---|---|---|---|---|---|---|---|---|
| 535401 | 2015 AG_{178} | — | October 3, 2006 | Mount Lemmon | Mount Lemmon Survey | NYS | 890 m | MPC · JPL |
| 535402 | 2015 AZ_{178} | — | January 27, 2011 | Mount Lemmon | Mount Lemmon Survey | · | 1.0 km | MPC · JPL |
| 535403 | 2015 AR_{179} | — | August 10, 2007 | Kitt Peak | Spacewatch | EMA | 2.7 km | MPC · JPL |
| 535404 | 2015 AB_{182} | — | March 15, 2007 | Kitt Peak | Spacewatch | · | 1.3 km | MPC · JPL |
| 535405 | 2015 AK_{183} | — | December 21, 2014 | Haleakala | Pan-STARRS 1 | AGN | 1.1 km | MPC · JPL |
| 535406 | 2015 AV_{185} | — | March 14, 2007 | Mount Lemmon | Mount Lemmon Survey | · | 1.7 km | MPC · JPL |
| 535407 | 2015 AD_{196} | — | October 3, 2013 | Mount Lemmon | Mount Lemmon Survey | · | 2.1 km | MPC · JPL |
| 535408 | 2015 AV_{196} | — | December 18, 2009 | Mount Lemmon | Mount Lemmon Survey | · | 1.6 km | MPC · JPL |
| 535409 | 2015 AH_{199} | — | January 14, 2011 | Kitt Peak | Spacewatch | · | 1.4 km | MPC · JPL |
| 535410 | 2015 AO_{202} | — | October 16, 2009 | Mount Lemmon | Mount Lemmon Survey | · | 1.3 km | MPC · JPL |
| 535411 | 2015 AQ_{205} | — | January 15, 2015 | Mount Lemmon | Mount Lemmon Survey | V | 550 m | MPC · JPL |
| 535412 | 2015 AU_{205} | — | November 21, 2009 | Mount Lemmon | Mount Lemmon Survey | EOS | 2.0 km | MPC · JPL |
| 535413 | 2015 AP_{207} | — | August 31, 2014 | Haleakala | Pan-STARRS 1 | · | 890 m | MPC · JPL |
| 535414 | 2015 AW_{207} | — | December 13, 2006 | Kitt Peak | Spacewatch | · | 1.0 km | MPC · JPL |
| 535415 | 2015 AX_{207} | — | October 22, 2014 | Mount Lemmon | Mount Lemmon Survey | EUN | 1.0 km | MPC · JPL |
| 535416 | 2015 AM_{211} | — | October 24, 2009 | Kitt Peak | Spacewatch | · | 2.6 km | MPC · JPL |
| 535417 | 2015 AU_{213} | — | April 27, 2012 | Haleakala | Pan-STARRS 1 | · | 1.4 km | MPC · JPL |
| 535418 | 2015 AH_{216} | — | October 29, 2005 | Mount Lemmon | Mount Lemmon Survey | · | 1.9 km | MPC · JPL |
| 535419 | 2015 AD_{219} | — | December 1, 2005 | Kitt Peak | Spacewatch | · | 1.3 km | MPC · JPL |
| 535420 | 2015 AW_{223} | — | November 27, 2009 | Mount Lemmon | Mount Lemmon Survey | DOR | 2.1 km | MPC · JPL |
| 535421 | 2015 AA_{224} | — | March 12, 2005 | Kitt Peak | Spacewatch | EOS | 1.6 km | MPC · JPL |
| 535422 | 2015 AG_{234} | — | January 8, 2010 | Mount Lemmon | Mount Lemmon Survey | · | 2.2 km | MPC · JPL |
| 535423 | 2015 AO_{235} | — | December 2, 2014 | Haleakala | Pan-STARRS 1 | · | 990 m | MPC · JPL |
| 535424 | 2015 AK_{236} | — | November 9, 2013 | Mount Lemmon | Mount Lemmon Survey | · | 2.7 km | MPC · JPL |
| 535425 | 2015 AD_{239} | — | February 12, 2008 | Mount Lemmon | Mount Lemmon Survey | · | 800 m | MPC · JPL |
| 535426 | 2015 AG_{239} | — | February 14, 2010 | Mount Lemmon | Mount Lemmon Survey | · | 1.7 km | MPC · JPL |
| 535427 | 2015 AH_{239} | — | January 16, 2010 | WISE | WISE | · | 1.9 km | MPC · JPL |
| 535428 | 2015 AU_{239} | — | February 21, 2001 | Kitt Peak | Spacewatch | · | 1.8 km | MPC · JPL |
| 535429 | 2015 AK_{241} | — | March 4, 2011 | Mount Lemmon | Mount Lemmon Survey | · | 1.2 km | MPC · JPL |
| 535430 | 2015 AD_{244} | — | November 26, 2014 | Haleakala | Pan-STARRS 1 | · | 1.9 km | MPC · JPL |
| 535431 | 2015 AM_{244} | — | January 28, 2011 | Catalina | CSS | · | 1.1 km | MPC · JPL |
| 535432 | 2015 AA_{245} | — | November 21, 2009 | Mount Lemmon | Mount Lemmon Survey | · | 1.9 km | MPC · JPL |
| 535433 | 2015 AJ_{246} | — | November 12, 2010 | Catalina | CSS | · | 1.1 km | MPC · JPL |
| 535434 | 2015 AM_{246} | — | October 13, 2001 | Kitt Peak | Spacewatch | L5 | 9.1 km | MPC · JPL |
| 535435 | 2015 AG_{251} | — | November 5, 2005 | Mount Lemmon | Mount Lemmon Survey | · | 1.1 km | MPC · JPL |
| 535436 | 2015 AW_{253} | — | September 30, 2006 | Mount Lemmon | Mount Lemmon Survey | MAS | 610 m | MPC · JPL |
| 535437 | 2015 AB_{254} | — | September 28, 2008 | Mount Lemmon | Mount Lemmon Survey | KOR | 1.1 km | MPC · JPL |
| 535438 | 2015 AP_{254} | — | October 22, 2005 | Kitt Peak | Spacewatch | · | 920 m | MPC · JPL |
| 535439 | 2015 AA_{255} | — | April 27, 2012 | Haleakala | Pan-STARRS 1 | · | 1.3 km | MPC · JPL |
| 535440 | 2015 AS_{257} | — | January 11, 2010 | Kitt Peak | Spacewatch | EOS | 1.8 km | MPC · JPL |
| 535441 | 2015 AX_{258} | — | October 9, 2008 | Mount Lemmon | Mount Lemmon Survey | EOS | 1.6 km | MPC · JPL |
| 535442 | 2015 AO_{260} | — | June 9, 2008 | Kitt Peak | Spacewatch | · | 1.8 km | MPC · JPL |
| 535443 | 2015 AR_{262} | — | January 15, 2015 | Mount Lemmon | Mount Lemmon Survey | EUN | 890 m | MPC · JPL |
| 535444 | 2015 AY_{262} | — | April 16, 2004 | Anderson Mesa | LONEOS | · | 1.2 km | MPC · JPL |
| 535445 | 2015 AH_{263} | — | November 25, 2014 | Haleakala | Pan-STARRS 1 | HNS | 1.1 km | MPC · JPL |
| 535446 | 2015 AH_{264} | — | May 3, 2011 | Mount Lemmon | Mount Lemmon Survey | JUN | 840 m | MPC · JPL |
| 535447 | 2015 AO_{264} | — | October 15, 2007 | Mount Lemmon | Mount Lemmon Survey | · | 3.5 km | MPC · JPL |
| 535448 | 2015 AS_{264} | — | April 26, 2006 | Kitt Peak | Spacewatch | · | 2.2 km | MPC · JPL |
| 535449 | 2015 AE_{265} | — | March 26, 2010 | WISE | WISE | DOR | 2.3 km | MPC · JPL |
| 535450 | 2015 AW_{266} | — | March 5, 2011 | Mount Lemmon | Mount Lemmon Survey | (12739) | 1.2 km | MPC · JPL |
| 535451 | 2015 AV_{269} | — | January 11, 2008 | Kitt Peak | Spacewatch | · | 920 m | MPC · JPL |
| 535452 | 2015 AL_{273} | — | March 13, 2007 | Mount Lemmon | Mount Lemmon Survey | AGN | 1.1 km | MPC · JPL |
| 535453 | 2015 AA_{274} | — | June 10, 2010 | WISE | WISE | ELF | 2.9 km | MPC · JPL |
| 535454 | 2015 AB_{274} | — | March 1, 2008 | Kitt Peak | Spacewatch | · | 1.1 km | MPC · JPL |
| 535455 | 2015 AD_{275} | — | January 14, 2015 | Haleakala | Pan-STARRS 1 | · | 780 m | MPC · JPL |
| 535456 | 2015 AK_{275} | — | October 8, 2005 | Kitt Peak | Spacewatch | (5) | 840 m | MPC · JPL |
| 535457 | 2015 AP_{276} | — | March 12, 2008 | Mount Lemmon | Mount Lemmon Survey | · | 1.0 km | MPC · JPL |
| 535458 | 2015 AQ_{276} | — | August 26, 2013 | Haleakala | Pan-STARRS 1 | · | 1.0 km | MPC · JPL |
| 535459 | 2015 AT_{276} | — | March 28, 2008 | Kitt Peak | Spacewatch | · | 900 m | MPC · JPL |
| 535460 | 2015 AJ_{277} | — | October 21, 2007 | Kitt Peak | Spacewatch | · | 2.5 km | MPC · JPL |
| 535461 | 2015 AM_{277} | — | December 31, 2008 | Mount Lemmon | Mount Lemmon Survey | · | 3.0 km | MPC · JPL |
| 535462 | 2015 AX_{277} | — | November 25, 2013 | Haleakala | Pan-STARRS 1 | EOS | 1.6 km | MPC · JPL |
| 535463 | 2015 AS_{279} | — | August 7, 2013 | Kitt Peak | Spacewatch | · | 1.3 km | MPC · JPL |
| 535464 | 2015 AU_{279} | — | February 8, 2011 | Kitt Peak | Spacewatch | · | 950 m | MPC · JPL |
| 535465 | 2015 AG_{280} | — | January 15, 2015 | Haleakala | Pan-STARRS 1 | HNS | 970 m | MPC · JPL |
| 535466 | 2015 AK_{281} | — | January 15, 2015 | Haleakala | Pan-STARRS 1 | cubewano (hot) | 202 km | MPC · JPL |
| 535467 | 2015 AT_{282} | — | January 11, 2015 | Haleakala | Pan-STARRS 1 | · | 1.9 km | MPC · JPL |
| 535468 | 2015 AA_{283} | — | September 6, 2008 | Catalina | CSS | · | 1.9 km | MPC · JPL |
| 535469 | 2015 AC_{283} | — | October 10, 2007 | Kitt Peak | Spacewatch | · | 5.1 km | MPC · JPL |
| 535470 | 2015 AH_{283} | — | September 10, 2013 | Haleakala | Pan-STARRS 1 | · | 2.3 km | MPC · JPL |
| 535471 | 2015 AJ_{283} | — | November 26, 2013 | Haleakala | Pan-STARRS 1 | EOS | 1.9 km | MPC · JPL |
| 535472 | 2015 AL_{283} | — | December 26, 2014 | Haleakala | Pan-STARRS 1 | · | 1.5 km | MPC · JPL |
| 535473 | 2015 AM_{283} | — | January 23, 2006 | Mount Lemmon | Mount Lemmon Survey | · | 1.5 km | MPC · JPL |
| 535474 | 2015 AN_{283} | — | March 28, 2012 | Mount Lemmon | Mount Lemmon Survey | V | 600 m | MPC · JPL |
| 535475 | 2015 AP_{283} | — | October 16, 2007 | Mount Lemmon | Mount Lemmon Survey | · | 4.5 km | MPC · JPL |
| 535476 | 2015 AQ_{283} | — | December 3, 2013 | Haleakala | Pan-STARRS 1 | · | 3.1 km | MPC · JPL |
| 535477 | 2015 AS_{283} | — | January 15, 2015 | Haleakala | Pan-STARRS 1 | EUN | 1.1 km | MPC · JPL |
| 535478 | 2015 AT_{283} | — | March 11, 2005 | Catalina | CSS | · | 2.4 km | MPC · JPL |
| 535479 | 2015 AU_{283} | — | January 13, 2015 | Haleakala | Pan-STARRS 1 | PHO | 1.0 km | MPC · JPL |
| 535480 | 2015 AV_{283} | — | March 6, 2008 | Mount Lemmon | Mount Lemmon Survey | V | 560 m | MPC · JPL |
| 535481 | 2015 AW_{283} | — | April 13, 2012 | Kitt Peak | Spacewatch | · | 1.6 km | MPC · JPL |
| 535482 | 2015 AY_{283} | — | January 15, 2015 | Haleakala | Pan-STARRS 1 | · | 2.7 km | MPC · JPL |
| 535483 | 2015 AA_{284} | — | January 15, 2015 | Haleakala | Pan-STARRS 1 | · | 1.2 km | MPC · JPL |
| 535484 | 2015 AF_{284} | — | January 19, 2002 | Anderson Mesa | LONEOS | · | 2.7 km | MPC · JPL |
| 535485 | 2015 AH_{284} | — | January 11, 2008 | Mount Lemmon | Mount Lemmon Survey | PHO | 930 m | MPC · JPL |
| 535486 | 2015 AO_{284} | — | June 12, 2005 | Kitt Peak | Spacewatch | · | 1.4 km | MPC · JPL |
| 535487 | 2015 AA_{285} | — | January 17, 2015 | Haleakala | Pan-STARRS 1 | · | 1.9 km | MPC · JPL |
| 535488 | 2015 AF_{285} | — | September 20, 2009 | Kitt Peak | Spacewatch | · | 1.3 km | MPC · JPL |
| 535489 | 2015 AL_{286} | — | October 8, 2008 | Mount Lemmon | Mount Lemmon Survey | · | 1.5 km | MPC · JPL |
| 535490 | 2015 AS_{286} | — | March 18, 2010 | Kitt Peak | Spacewatch | · | 2.9 km | MPC · JPL |
| 535491 | 2015 AT_{286} | — | October 3, 2013 | Haleakala | Pan-STARRS 1 | GEF | 1.2 km | MPC · JPL |
| 535492 | 2015 AA_{287} | — | November 18, 2006 | Kitt Peak | Spacewatch | · | 1.5 km | MPC · JPL |
| 535493 | 2015 AE_{287} | — | September 18, 2014 | Haleakala | Pan-STARRS 1 | EUN | 1.2 km | MPC · JPL |
| 535494 | 2015 AF_{287} | — | July 2, 2013 | Haleakala | Pan-STARRS 1 | · | 1.4 km | MPC · JPL |
| 535495 | 2015 AO_{287} | — | February 10, 2002 | Socorro | LINEAR | · | 2.0 km | MPC · JPL |
| 535496 | 2015 AX_{287} | — | November 18, 1995 | Kitt Peak | Spacewatch | · | 1.1 km | MPC · JPL |
| 535497 | 2015 AA_{288} | — | November 22, 2009 | Catalina | CSS | GEF | 1.1 km | MPC · JPL |
| 535498 | 2015 AE_{288} | — | April 12, 2011 | Mount Lemmon | Mount Lemmon Survey | EOS | 2.2 km | MPC · JPL |
| 535499 | 2015 AG_{289} | — | September 20, 2001 | Socorro | LINEAR | (5) | 1.1 km | MPC · JPL |
| 535500 | 2015 AJ_{289} | — | November 11, 2004 | Kitt Peak | Spacewatch | · | 2.8 km | MPC · JPL |

== 535501–535600 ==
back to top

| Designation | | | Discovery | | | Properties | | Ref |
| Permanent | Provisional | Named after | Date | Site | Discoverer(s) | Category | Diam. | Ref |
|---|---|---|---|---|---|---|---|---|
| 535501 | 2015 AD_{292} | — | January 16, 2008 | Mount Lemmon | Mount Lemmon Survey | · | 640 m | MPC · JPL |
| 535502 | 2015 AJ_{293} | — | January 15, 2015 | Haleakala | Pan-STARRS 1 | · | 1.9 km | MPC · JPL |
| 535503 | 2015 BJ_{1} | — | December 11, 2009 | Mount Lemmon | Mount Lemmon Survey | · | 1.8 km | MPC · JPL |
| 535504 | 2015 BK_{3} | — | August 23, 2004 | Kitt Peak | Spacewatch | (18466) | 1.8 km | MPC · JPL |
| 535505 | 2015 BN_{5} | — | February 9, 2010 | Kitt Peak | Spacewatch | EOS | 1.6 km | MPC · JPL |
| 535506 | 2015 BX_{5} | — | June 14, 2010 | WISE | WISE | · | 3.3 km | MPC · JPL |
| 535507 | 2015 BG_{6} | — | September 10, 2013 | Haleakala | Pan-STARRS 1 | · | 1.9 km | MPC · JPL |
| 535508 | 2015 BV_{8} | — | March 11, 2007 | Kitt Peak | Spacewatch | · | 1.1 km | MPC · JPL |
| 535509 | 2015 BV_{9} | — | October 27, 2005 | Mount Lemmon | Mount Lemmon Survey | · | 2.1 km | MPC · JPL |
| 535510 | 2015 BA_{10} | — | March 12, 2011 | Mount Lemmon | Mount Lemmon Survey | GEF | 1.1 km | MPC · JPL |
| 535511 | 2015 BJ_{11} | — | October 22, 2006 | Kitt Peak | Spacewatch | · | 1.2 km | MPC · JPL |
| 535512 | 2015 BK_{11} | — | March 2, 2008 | Kitt Peak | Spacewatch | · | 1.3 km | MPC · JPL |
| 535513 | 2015 BO_{11} | — | May 4, 2005 | Mount Lemmon | Mount Lemmon Survey | · | 610 m | MPC · JPL |
| 535514 | 2015 BT_{13} | — | August 31, 2005 | Kitt Peak | Spacewatch | · | 1.2 km | MPC · JPL |
| 535515 | 2015 BF_{15} | — | February 1, 2006 | Mount Lemmon | Mount Lemmon Survey | DOR | 1.8 km | MPC · JPL |
| 535516 | 2015 BG_{15} | — | January 31, 2006 | Kitt Peak | Spacewatch | · | 1.6 km | MPC · JPL |
| 535517 | 2015 BZ_{15} | — | October 5, 2013 | Kitt Peak | Spacewatch | · | 2.2 km | MPC · JPL |
| 535518 | 2015 BX_{16} | — | January 16, 2015 | Mount Lemmon | Mount Lemmon Survey | EOS | 1.8 km | MPC · JPL |
| 535519 | 2015 BN_{17} | — | March 4, 2011 | Catalina | CSS | · | 1.1 km | MPC · JPL |
| 535520 | 2015 BU_{17} | — | November 26, 2014 | Haleakala | Pan-STARRS 1 | · | 1.3 km | MPC · JPL |
| 535521 | 2015 BZ_{17} | — | January 23, 2006 | Kitt Peak | Spacewatch | EUN | 1.2 km | MPC · JPL |
| 535522 | 2015 BJ_{19} | — | October 24, 2005 | Kitt Peak | Spacewatch | · | 920 m | MPC · JPL |
| 535523 | 2015 BX_{20} | — | March 3, 2006 | Kitt Peak | Spacewatch | GEF | 940 m | MPC · JPL |
| 535524 | 2015 BT_{22} | — | January 16, 2015 | Haleakala | Pan-STARRS 1 | EOS | 1.7 km | MPC · JPL |
| 535525 | 2015 BF_{23} | — | May 16, 2005 | Mount Lemmon | Mount Lemmon Survey | · | 3.1 km | MPC · JPL |
| 535526 | 2015 BN_{23} | — | November 19, 2008 | Kitt Peak | Spacewatch | · | 1.8 km | MPC · JPL |
| 535527 | 2015 BR_{24} | — | July 28, 2011 | Haleakala | Pan-STARRS 1 | · | 2.8 km | MPC · JPL |
| 535528 | 2015 BV_{25} | — | January 11, 2010 | Kitt Peak | Spacewatch | TRE | 2.0 km | MPC · JPL |
| 535529 | 2015 BL_{26} | — | November 11, 2013 | Mount Lemmon | Mount Lemmon Survey | EOS | 1.8 km | MPC · JPL |
| 535530 Gustavborn | 2015 BQ_{26} | Gustavborn | January 16, 2015 | Haleakala | Pan-STARRS 1 | · | 1.0 km | MPC · JPL |
| 535531 | 2015 BC_{27} | — | March 10, 2007 | Kitt Peak | Spacewatch | · | 810 m | MPC · JPL |
| 535532 | 2015 BD_{27} | — | March 4, 2011 | Mount Lemmon | Mount Lemmon Survey | · | 660 m | MPC · JPL |
| 535533 | 2015 BV_{27} | — | January 29, 2009 | Mount Lemmon | Mount Lemmon Survey | · | 3.3 km | MPC · JPL |
| 535534 | 2015 BF_{28} | — | September 11, 2007 | Catalina | CSS | · | 3.5 km | MPC · JPL |
| 535535 | 2015 BV_{28} | — | October 9, 2007 | Mount Lemmon | Mount Lemmon Survey | EOS | 1.9 km | MPC · JPL |
| 535536 | 2015 BD_{30} | — | December 21, 2008 | Kitt Peak | Spacewatch | · | 3.3 km | MPC · JPL |
| 535537 | 2015 BM_{30} | — | July 13, 2013 | Haleakala | Pan-STARRS 1 | EOS | 1.8 km | MPC · JPL |
| 535538 | 2015 BQ_{30} | — | May 2, 2006 | Mount Lemmon | Mount Lemmon Survey | · | 1.5 km | MPC · JPL |
| 535539 | 2015 BP_{33} | — | December 27, 2009 | Kitt Peak | Spacewatch | KOR | 1.4 km | MPC · JPL |
| 535540 | 2015 BN_{34} | — | April 9, 2003 | Kitt Peak | Spacewatch | · | 1.4 km | MPC · JPL |
| 535541 | 2015 BE_{35} | — | December 7, 2005 | Kitt Peak | Spacewatch | · | 1.0 km | MPC · JPL |
| 535542 | 2015 BN_{35} | — | January 16, 2015 | Haleakala | Pan-STARRS 1 | · | 1.4 km | MPC · JPL |
| 535543 | 2015 BR_{35} | — | November 20, 2009 | Mount Lemmon | Mount Lemmon Survey | · | 1.8 km | MPC · JPL |
| 535544 | 2015 BS_{35} | — | January 16, 2015 | Haleakala | Pan-STARRS 1 | · | 3.0 km | MPC · JPL |
| 535545 | 2015 BC_{36} | — | November 9, 2013 | Mount Lemmon | Mount Lemmon Survey | · | 1.1 km | MPC · JPL |
| 535546 | 2015 BN_{36} | — | January 7, 2010 | Kitt Peak | Spacewatch | · | 2.3 km | MPC · JPL |
| 535547 | 2015 BS_{36} | — | February 24, 2006 | Catalina | CSS | · | 1.6 km | MPC · JPL |
| 535548 | 2015 BY_{36} | — | December 1, 2005 | Catalina | CSS | (1547) | 1.2 km | MPC · JPL |
| 535549 | 2015 BU_{37} | — | October 21, 1995 | Kitt Peak | Spacewatch | · | 1.3 km | MPC · JPL |
| 535550 | 2015 BP_{38} | — | October 28, 2014 | Haleakala | Pan-STARRS 1 | · | 1.2 km | MPC · JPL |
| 535551 | 2015 BJ_{39} | — | October 26, 2009 | Mount Lemmon | Mount Lemmon Survey | · | 2.0 km | MPC · JPL |
| 535552 | 2015 BO_{40} | — | July 27, 2005 | Siding Spring | SSS | · | 1.3 km | MPC · JPL |
| 535553 | 2015 BY_{40} | — | January 17, 2015 | Kitt Peak | Spacewatch | · | 1.7 km | MPC · JPL |
| 535554 | 2015 BM_{41} | — | January 17, 2015 | Mount Lemmon | Mount Lemmon Survey | · | 1.6 km | MPC · JPL |
| 535555 | 2015 BJ_{42} | — | November 3, 2005 | Mount Lemmon | Mount Lemmon Survey | · | 1.2 km | MPC · JPL |
| 535556 | 2015 BV_{44} | — | February 13, 1999 | Kitt Peak | Spacewatch | · | 2.9 km | MPC · JPL |
| 535557 | 2015 BW_{45} | — | November 20, 2001 | Socorro | LINEAR | · | 1.1 km | MPC · JPL |
| 535558 | 2015 BN_{54} | — | October 4, 2013 | Mount Lemmon | Mount Lemmon Survey | MAR | 1.1 km | MPC · JPL |
| 535559 | 2015 BR_{54} | — | October 15, 2004 | Kitt Peak | Spacewatch | · | 2.3 km | MPC · JPL |
| 535560 | 2015 BS_{54} | — | November 16, 2014 | Mount Lemmon | Mount Lemmon Survey | · | 1.4 km | MPC · JPL |
| 535561 | 2015 BB_{55} | — | September 3, 2008 | Kitt Peak | Spacewatch | · | 1.6 km | MPC · JPL |
| 535562 | 2015 BJ_{56} | — | November 20, 2008 | Kitt Peak | Spacewatch | · | 2.7 km | MPC · JPL |
| 535563 | 2015 BL_{56} | — | November 9, 2009 | Mount Lemmon | Mount Lemmon Survey | · | 1.7 km | MPC · JPL |
| 535564 | 2015 BX_{56} | — | November 4, 2014 | Haleakala | Pan-STARRS 1 | EUN | 1.6 km | MPC · JPL |
| 535565 | 2015 BY_{57} | — | January 27, 2006 | Kitt Peak | Spacewatch | · | 1.4 km | MPC · JPL |
| 535566 | 2015 BH_{58} | — | February 8, 2011 | Mount Lemmon | Mount Lemmon Survey | · | 680 m | MPC · JPL |
| 535567 | 2015 BC_{60} | — | September 1, 2013 | Haleakala | Pan-STARRS 1 | · | 1.0 km | MPC · JPL |
| 535568 | 2015 BE_{60} | — | November 24, 2006 | Kitt Peak | Spacewatch | V | 540 m | MPC · JPL |
| 535569 | 2015 BF_{60} | — | November 26, 2014 | Haleakala | Pan-STARRS 1 | · | 1.5 km | MPC · JPL |
| 535570 | 2015 BJ_{60} | — | November 16, 2006 | Kitt Peak | Spacewatch | · | 780 m | MPC · JPL |
| 535571 | 2015 BN_{60} | — | January 17, 2015 | Haleakala | Pan-STARRS 1 | · | 2.0 km | MPC · JPL |
| 535572 | 2015 BV_{62} | — | October 23, 2013 | Haleakala | Pan-STARRS 1 | EOS | 2.0 km | MPC · JPL |
| 535573 | 2015 BB_{64} | — | July 14, 2013 | Haleakala | Pan-STARRS 1 | HYG | 2.6 km | MPC · JPL |
| 535574 | 2015 BC_{64} | — | November 1, 2013 | Mount Lemmon | Mount Lemmon Survey | · | 1.7 km | MPC · JPL |
| 535575 | 2015 BD_{64} | — | November 9, 2008 | Mount Lemmon | Mount Lemmon Survey | TEL | 1.1 km | MPC · JPL |
| 535576 | 2015 BQ_{64} | — | October 25, 2008 | Kitt Peak | Spacewatch | · | 2.7 km | MPC · JPL |
| 535577 | 2015 BR_{64} | — | May 11, 2010 | WISE | WISE | · | 3.3 km | MPC · JPL |
| 535578 | 2015 BE_{65} | — | March 5, 2002 | Apache Point | SDSS | · | 1.6 km | MPC · JPL |
| 535579 | 2015 BL_{65} | — | November 18, 2001 | Socorro | LINEAR | · | 990 m | MPC · JPL |
| 535580 | 2015 BP_{65} | — | February 13, 2011 | Mount Lemmon | Mount Lemmon Survey | · | 1.1 km | MPC · JPL |
| 535581 | 2015 BZ_{65} | — | December 24, 2006 | Kitt Peak | Spacewatch | · | 870 m | MPC · JPL |
| 535582 | 2015 BD_{66} | — | November 10, 2006 | Kitt Peak | Spacewatch | · | 880 m | MPC · JPL |
| 535583 | 2015 BG_{67} | — | September 29, 2009 | Mount Lemmon | Mount Lemmon Survey | · | 2.3 km | MPC · JPL |
| 535584 | 2015 BJ_{67} | — | October 18, 2009 | Mount Lemmon | Mount Lemmon Survey | · | 1.0 km | MPC · JPL |
| 535585 | 2015 BR_{67} | — | February 24, 2006 | Mount Lemmon | Mount Lemmon Survey | AGN | 1.1 km | MPC · JPL |
| 535586 | 2015 BB_{68} | — | August 9, 2013 | Kitt Peak | Spacewatch | BAR | 980 m | MPC · JPL |
| 535587 | 2015 BO_{68} | — | May 9, 2011 | Mount Lemmon | Mount Lemmon Survey | EOS | 2.0 km | MPC · JPL |
| 535588 | 2015 BP_{69} | — | May 27, 2008 | Kitt Peak | Spacewatch | · | 1.1 km | MPC · JPL |
| 535589 | 2015 BA_{72} | — | February 26, 2008 | Mount Lemmon | Mount Lemmon Survey | · | 820 m | MPC · JPL |
| 535590 | 2015 BC_{72} | — | February 12, 2011 | Mount Lemmon | Mount Lemmon Survey | · | 1.1 km | MPC · JPL |
| 535591 | 2015 BV_{72} | — | January 17, 2010 | WISE | WISE | · | 2.8 km | MPC · JPL |
| 535592 | 2015 BL_{73} | — | January 27, 2007 | Mount Lemmon | Mount Lemmon Survey | · | 860 m | MPC · JPL |
| 535593 | 2015 BG_{75} | — | December 30, 2005 | Kitt Peak | Spacewatch | · | 1.5 km | MPC · JPL |
| 535594 | 2015 BJ_{75} | — | December 4, 2007 | Mount Lemmon | Mount Lemmon Survey | · | 830 m | MPC · JPL |
| 535595 | 2015 BY_{75} | — | September 15, 2006 | Kitt Peak | Spacewatch | · | 950 m | MPC · JPL |
| 535596 | 2015 BP_{77} | — | February 28, 2008 | Mount Lemmon | Mount Lemmon Survey | · | 950 m | MPC · JPL |
| 535597 | 2015 BC_{78} | — | April 2, 2011 | Kitt Peak | Spacewatch | GEF | 1.2 km | MPC · JPL |
| 535598 | 2015 BD_{78} | — | April 19, 2006 | Anderson Mesa | LONEOS | · | 2.7 km | MPC · JPL |
| 535599 | 2015 BH_{78} | — | November 26, 2014 | Haleakala | Pan-STARRS 1 | · | 2.8 km | MPC · JPL |
| 535600 | 2015 BF_{79} | — | April 11, 2007 | Mount Lemmon | Mount Lemmon Survey | · | 1.5 km | MPC · JPL |

== 535601–535700 ==
back to top

| Designation | | | Discovery | | | Properties | | Ref |
| Permanent | Provisional | Named after | Date | Site | Discoverer(s) | Category | Diam. | Ref |
|---|---|---|---|---|---|---|---|---|
| 535601 | 2015 BO_{80} | — | April 25, 2007 | Kitt Peak | Spacewatch | · | 3.4 km | MPC · JPL |
| 535602 | 2015 BG_{82} | — | October 13, 2010 | Mount Lemmon | Mount Lemmon Survey | · | 1.1 km | MPC · JPL |
| 535603 | 2015 BJ_{82} | — | September 14, 2005 | Kitt Peak | Spacewatch | · | 940 m | MPC · JPL |
| 535604 | 2015 BK_{85} | — | March 2, 2011 | Mount Lemmon | Mount Lemmon Survey | (5) | 950 m | MPC · JPL |
| 535605 | 2015 BT_{85} | — | December 5, 2010 | Mount Lemmon | Mount Lemmon Survey | · | 1.1 km | MPC · JPL |
| 535606 | 2015 BU_{85} | — | November 18, 2008 | Kitt Peak | Spacewatch | · | 2.2 km | MPC · JPL |
| 535607 | 2015 BJ_{86} | — | April 3, 2008 | Kitt Peak | Spacewatch | · | 1.2 km | MPC · JPL |
| 535608 | 2015 BM_{86} | — | September 14, 2013 | Haleakala | Pan-STARRS 1 | EUN | 1.0 km | MPC · JPL |
| 535609 | 2015 BV_{86} | — | September 24, 2012 | Mount Lemmon | Mount Lemmon Survey | · | 3.1 km | MPC · JPL |
| 535610 | 2015 BE_{87} | — | February 11, 2010 | WISE | WISE | · | 1.7 km | MPC · JPL |
| 535611 | 2015 BG_{87} | — | November 20, 2006 | Kitt Peak | Spacewatch | MAS | 620 m | MPC · JPL |
| 535612 | 2015 BJ_{87} | — | October 2, 2006 | Mount Lemmon | Mount Lemmon Survey | MAS | 710 m | MPC · JPL |
| 535613 | 2015 BN_{87} | — | April 24, 2006 | Mount Lemmon | Mount Lemmon Survey | · | 2.5 km | MPC · JPL |
| 535614 | 2015 BQ_{87} | — | January 27, 2000 | Kitt Peak | Spacewatch | · | 2.1 km | MPC · JPL |
| 535615 | 2015 BF_{89} | — | November 16, 2009 | Mount Lemmon | Mount Lemmon Survey | · | 1.4 km | MPC · JPL |
| 535616 | 2015 BL_{90} | — | August 9, 2007 | Kitt Peak | Spacewatch | EOS | 1.9 km | MPC · JPL |
| 535617 | 2015 BN_{90} | — | February 11, 2002 | Kitt Peak | Spacewatch | · | 1.6 km | MPC · JPL |
| 535618 | 2015 BX_{90} | — | November 28, 2013 | Haleakala | Pan-STARRS 1 | · | 1.2 km | MPC · JPL |
| 535619 | 2015 BJ_{91} | — | January 18, 2015 | Haleakala | Pan-STARRS 1 | · | 2.3 km | MPC · JPL |
| 535620 | 2015 BL_{91} | — | January 29, 2011 | Kitt Peak | Spacewatch | · | 830 m | MPC · JPL |
| 535621 | 2015 BN_{91} | — | November 25, 2009 | Kitt Peak | Spacewatch | · | 2.3 km | MPC · JPL |
| 535622 | 2015 BS_{97} | — | May 29, 2012 | Mount Lemmon | Mount Lemmon Survey | HNS | 1.2 km | MPC · JPL |
| 535623 | 2015 BY_{97} | — | January 28, 2011 | Mount Lemmon | Mount Lemmon Survey | EUN | 900 m | MPC · JPL |
| 535624 | 2015 BB_{98} | — | November 17, 2009 | Kitt Peak | Spacewatch | · | 1.4 km | MPC · JPL |
| 535625 | 2015 BC_{98} | — | October 3, 2008 | Mount Lemmon | Mount Lemmon Survey | (16286) | 2.4 km | MPC · JPL |
| 535626 | 2015 BJ_{99} | — | January 14, 2011 | Mount Lemmon | Mount Lemmon Survey | · | 1.0 km | MPC · JPL |
| 535627 | 2015 BU_{99} | — | November 19, 2009 | Kitt Peak | Spacewatch | · | 1.4 km | MPC · JPL |
| 535628 | 2015 BJ_{100} | — | May 27, 2006 | Kitt Peak | Spacewatch | EMA | 3.3 km | MPC · JPL |
| 535629 | 2015 BN_{100} | — | January 15, 2009 | Kitt Peak | Spacewatch | · | 2.9 km | MPC · JPL |
| 535630 | 2015 BO_{101} | — | March 21, 2004 | Kitt Peak | Spacewatch | · | 950 m | MPC · JPL |
| 535631 | 2015 BP_{101} | — | January 30, 2008 | Kitt Peak | Spacewatch | · | 810 m | MPC · JPL |
| 535632 | 2015 BD_{102} | — | September 14, 2006 | Kitt Peak | Spacewatch | NYS | 900 m | MPC · JPL |
| 535633 | 2015 BF_{104} | — | January 21, 2006 | Kitt Peak | Spacewatch | · | 1.4 km | MPC · JPL |
| 535634 | 2015 BZ_{104} | — | December 17, 2009 | Kitt Peak | Spacewatch | · | 1.9 km | MPC · JPL |
| 535635 | 2015 BR_{106} | — | January 7, 2000 | Kitt Peak | Spacewatch | · | 2.4 km | MPC · JPL |
| 535636 | 2015 BG_{107} | — | September 14, 2012 | La Sagra | OAM | · | 2.3 km | MPC · JPL |
| 535637 | 2015 BO_{107} | — | December 15, 2004 | Kitt Peak | Spacewatch | · | 2.3 km | MPC · JPL |
| 535638 | 2015 BT_{107} | — | November 4, 2010 | Mount Lemmon | Mount Lemmon Survey | · | 680 m | MPC · JPL |
| 535639 | 2015 BE_{108} | — | April 7, 2010 | WISE | WISE | · | 4.3 km | MPC · JPL |
| 535640 | 2015 BT_{108} | — | January 16, 2010 | Mount Lemmon | Mount Lemmon Survey | NAE | 2.6 km | MPC · JPL |
| 535641 | 2015 BL_{109} | — | October 9, 2004 | Kitt Peak | Spacewatch | · | 1.7 km | MPC · JPL |
| 535642 | 2015 BY_{111} | — | March 13, 2007 | Mount Lemmon | Mount Lemmon Survey | · | 1.9 km | MPC · JPL |
| 535643 | 2015 BW_{112} | — | July 15, 2013 | Haleakala | Pan-STARRS 1 | · | 1.4 km | MPC · JPL |
| 535644 | 2015 BV_{113} | — | October 31, 2008 | Kitt Peak | Spacewatch | · | 2.7 km | MPC · JPL |
| 535645 | 2015 BZ_{116} | — | March 10, 2005 | Catalina | CSS | · | 4.1 km | MPC · JPL |
| 535646 | 2015 BL_{117} | — | December 5, 2010 | Mount Lemmon | Mount Lemmon Survey | · | 660 m | MPC · JPL |
| 535647 | 2015 BN_{118} | — | November 26, 2014 | Mount Lemmon | Mount Lemmon Survey | BRA | 1.7 km | MPC · JPL |
| 535648 | 2015 BE_{119} | — | January 17, 2015 | Kitt Peak | Spacewatch | · | 1.8 km | MPC · JPL |
| 535649 | 2015 BO_{119} | — | April 6, 2008 | Kitt Peak | Spacewatch | · | 1.2 km | MPC · JPL |
| 535650 | 2015 BR_{119} | — | March 20, 2010 | WISE | WISE | DOR | 2.1 km | MPC · JPL |
| 535651 | 2015 BV_{119} | — | December 27, 2006 | Mount Lemmon | Mount Lemmon Survey | · | 1.2 km | MPC · JPL |
| 535652 | 2015 BO_{120} | — | May 1, 2009 | Kitt Peak | Spacewatch | · | 570 m | MPC · JPL |
| 535653 | 2015 BR_{120} | — | October 24, 2005 | Kitt Peak | Spacewatch | · | 1.1 km | MPC · JPL |
| 535654 | 2015 BX_{120} | — | September 5, 2013 | Kitt Peak | Spacewatch | · | 1.6 km | MPC · JPL |
| 535655 | 2015 BV_{121} | — | March 12, 2005 | Kitt Peak | Spacewatch | · | 2.9 km | MPC · JPL |
| 535656 | 2015 BT_{122} | — | March 15, 2012 | Haleakala | Pan-STARRS 1 | · | 760 m | MPC · JPL |
| 535657 | 2015 BD_{124} | — | January 23, 2006 | Mount Lemmon | Mount Lemmon Survey | · | 1.6 km | MPC · JPL |
| 535658 | 2015 BT_{129} | — | January 16, 2015 | Mount Lemmon | Mount Lemmon Survey | · | 920 m | MPC · JPL |
| 535659 | 2015 BV_{129} | — | March 6, 2008 | Mount Lemmon | Mount Lemmon Survey | · | 1.1 km | MPC · JPL |
| 535660 | 2015 BK_{130} | — | March 12, 2007 | Kitt Peak | Spacewatch | · | 820 m | MPC · JPL |
| 535661 | 2015 BR_{130} | — | November 27, 2009 | Kitt Peak | Spacewatch | · | 1.8 km | MPC · JPL |
| 535662 | 2015 BW_{131} | — | April 26, 2011 | Kitt Peak | Spacewatch | · | 3.3 km | MPC · JPL |
| 535663 | 2015 BB_{132} | — | September 25, 2005 | Kitt Peak | Spacewatch | · | 1.2 km | MPC · JPL |
| 535664 | 2015 BO_{132} | — | September 1, 2005 | Kitt Peak | Spacewatch | (5) | 750 m | MPC · JPL |
| 535665 | 2015 BQ_{133} | — | January 4, 2011 | Mount Lemmon | Mount Lemmon Survey | NYS | 960 m | MPC · JPL |
| 535666 | 2015 BV_{133} | — | February 13, 2010 | Kitt Peak | Spacewatch | · | 3.4 km | MPC · JPL |
| 535667 | 2015 BC_{136} | — | January 17, 2015 | Haleakala | Pan-STARRS 1 | · | 1.1 km | MPC · JPL |
| 535668 | 2015 BR_{138} | — | August 14, 2013 | Haleakala | Pan-STARRS 1 | V | 610 m | MPC · JPL |
| 535669 | 2015 BV_{138} | — | January 17, 2015 | Haleakala | Pan-STARRS 1 | · | 2.2 km | MPC · JPL |
| 535670 | 2015 BK_{140} | — | February 3, 2008 | Kitt Peak | Spacewatch | · | 770 m | MPC · JPL |
| 535671 | 2015 BE_{141} | — | December 8, 2005 | Kitt Peak | Spacewatch | · | 3.5 km | MPC · JPL |
| 535672 | 2015 BM_{141} | — | May 25, 2006 | Kitt Peak | Spacewatch | · | 2.5 km | MPC · JPL |
| 535673 | 2015 BD_{142} | — | January 17, 2015 | Haleakala | Pan-STARRS 1 | MAR | 980 m | MPC · JPL |
| 535674 | 2015 BE_{142} | — | March 12, 2008 | Kitt Peak | Spacewatch | V | 650 m | MPC · JPL |
| 535675 | 2015 BN_{143} | — | October 7, 2004 | Kitt Peak | Spacewatch | MRX | 1.1 km | MPC · JPL |
| 535676 | 2015 BU_{146} | — | March 31, 2008 | Mount Lemmon | Mount Lemmon Survey | MAS | 560 m | MPC · JPL |
| 535677 | 2015 BX_{146} | — | January 17, 2015 | Haleakala | Pan-STARRS 1 | V | 530 m | MPC · JPL |
| 535678 | 2015 BO_{147} | — | January 27, 2007 | Kitt Peak | Spacewatch | · | 740 m | MPC · JPL |
| 535679 | 2015 BB_{148} | — | March 8, 2010 | WISE | WISE | DOR | 2.0 km | MPC · JPL |
| 535680 | 2015 BX_{149} | — | December 30, 2005 | Mount Lemmon | Mount Lemmon Survey | · | 1.3 km | MPC · JPL |
| 535681 | 2015 BA_{150} | — | September 17, 2009 | Mount Lemmon | Mount Lemmon Survey | · | 980 m | MPC · JPL |
| 535682 | 2015 BC_{150} | — | January 12, 1996 | Kitt Peak | Spacewatch | NYS | 870 m | MPC · JPL |
| 535683 | 2015 BW_{150} | — | March 13, 2010 | Mount Lemmon | Mount Lemmon Survey | · | 2.5 km | MPC · JPL |
| 535684 | 2015 BE_{151} | — | March 5, 2011 | Mount Lemmon | Mount Lemmon Survey | · | 880 m | MPC · JPL |
| 535685 | 2015 BY_{152} | — | June 6, 2008 | Kitt Peak | Spacewatch | · | 1.1 km | MPC · JPL |
| 535686 | 2015 BM_{153} | — | March 27, 2008 | Kitt Peak | Spacewatch | · | 950 m | MPC · JPL |
| 535687 | 2015 BS_{153} | — | April 14, 2008 | Kitt Peak | Spacewatch | MAS | 550 m | MPC · JPL |
| 535688 | 2015 BX_{155} | — | February 17, 2010 | WISE | WISE | · | 1.8 km | MPC · JPL |
| 535689 | 2015 BK_{156} | — | February 18, 2008 | Mount Lemmon | Mount Lemmon Survey | V | 760 m | MPC · JPL |
| 535690 | 2015 BS_{156} | — | September 14, 2013 | Haleakala | Pan-STARRS 1 | · | 930 m | MPC · JPL |
| 535691 | 2015 BB_{157} | — | November 18, 2009 | Kitt Peak | Spacewatch | · | 1.4 km | MPC · JPL |
| 535692 | 2015 BD_{157} | — | January 31, 2006 | Catalina | CSS | · | 2.4 km | MPC · JPL |
| 535693 | 2015 BQ_{166} | — | October 27, 2005 | Mount Lemmon | Mount Lemmon Survey | · | 1.0 km | MPC · JPL |
| 535694 | 2015 BW_{167} | — | March 6, 2011 | Kitt Peak | Spacewatch | · | 1.5 km | MPC · JPL |
| 535695 | 2015 BP_{169} | — | December 30, 2005 | Kitt Peak | Spacewatch | · | 1.3 km | MPC · JPL |
| 535696 | 2015 BR_{169} | — | September 5, 2008 | Kitt Peak | Spacewatch | JUN | 910 m | MPC · JPL |
| 535697 | 2015 BQ_{173} | — | April 3, 2000 | Kitt Peak | Spacewatch | MAS | 690 m | MPC · JPL |
| 535698 | 2015 BL_{174} | — | April 1, 2011 | Mount Lemmon | Mount Lemmon Survey | · | 1.4 km | MPC · JPL |
| 535699 | 2015 BF_{175} | — | September 5, 2013 | Kitt Peak | Spacewatch | · | 1.9 km | MPC · JPL |
| 535700 | 2015 BK_{175} | — | March 6, 2011 | Mount Lemmon | Mount Lemmon Survey | · | 900 m | MPC · JPL |

== 535701–535800 ==
back to top

| Designation | | | Discovery | | | Properties | | Ref |
| Permanent | Provisional | Named after | Date | Site | Discoverer(s) | Category | Diam. | Ref |
|---|---|---|---|---|---|---|---|---|
| 535701 | 2015 BT_{175} | — | May 31, 2006 | Kitt Peak | Spacewatch | · | 2.9 km | MPC · JPL |
| 535702 | 2015 BE_{179} | — | August 10, 2007 | Kitt Peak | Spacewatch | EOS | 3.0 km | MPC · JPL |
| 535703 | 2015 BQ_{179} | — | February 23, 2007 | Mount Lemmon | Mount Lemmon Survey | · | 1.4 km | MPC · JPL |
| 535704 | 2015 BU_{179} | — | October 2, 2003 | Kitt Peak | Spacewatch | · | 2.5 km | MPC · JPL |
| 535705 | 2015 BN_{180} | — | September 12, 2013 | Mount Lemmon | Mount Lemmon Survey | PHO | 990 m | MPC · JPL |
| 535706 | 2015 BP_{181} | — | March 16, 2004 | Kitt Peak | Spacewatch | · | 1.1 km | MPC · JPL |
| 535707 | 2015 BF_{182} | — | October 23, 2013 | Haleakala | Pan-STARRS 1 | · | 2.1 km | MPC · JPL |
| 535708 | 2015 BM_{182} | — | October 1, 2005 | Kitt Peak | Spacewatch | · | 1.1 km | MPC · JPL |
| 535709 | 2015 BM_{184} | — | April 6, 2000 | Kitt Peak | Spacewatch | · | 1.7 km | MPC · JPL |
| 535710 | 2015 BK_{185} | — | November 6, 2013 | Haleakala | Pan-STARRS 1 | · | 2.5 km | MPC · JPL |
| 535711 | 2015 BK_{186} | — | September 1, 2013 | Mount Lemmon | Mount Lemmon Survey | · | 1.2 km | MPC · JPL |
| 535712 | 2015 BN_{186} | — | April 13, 2012 | Kitt Peak | Spacewatch | · | 970 m | MPC · JPL |
| 535713 | 2015 BC_{187} | — | January 7, 2006 | Kitt Peak | Spacewatch | · | 1.8 km | MPC · JPL |
| 535714 | 2015 BP_{188} | — | April 20, 2012 | Mount Lemmon | Mount Lemmon Survey | V | 500 m | MPC · JPL |
| 535715 | 2015 BV_{188} | — | January 10, 2008 | Mount Lemmon | Mount Lemmon Survey | · | 620 m | MPC · JPL |
| 535716 | 2015 BY_{188} | — | October 2, 2008 | Mount Lemmon | Mount Lemmon Survey | · | 2.0 km | MPC · JPL |
| 535717 | 2015 BE_{194} | — | November 10, 2013 | Mount Lemmon | Mount Lemmon Survey | · | 1.2 km | MPC · JPL |
| 535718 | 2015 BC_{197} | — | June 16, 2012 | Haleakala | Pan-STARRS 1 | KOR | 1.4 km | MPC · JPL |
| 535719 | 2015 BH_{200} | — | October 29, 2005 | Kitt Peak | Spacewatch | · | 1.3 km | MPC · JPL |
| 535720 | 2015 BM_{201} | — | November 9, 2013 | Haleakala | Pan-STARRS 1 | · | 1.5 km | MPC · JPL |
| 535721 | 2015 BV_{201} | — | October 7, 2004 | Kitt Peak | Spacewatch | · | 1.7 km | MPC · JPL |
| 535722 | 2015 BF_{202} | — | April 4, 2011 | Kitt Peak | Spacewatch | · | 1.9 km | MPC · JPL |
| 535723 | 2015 BF_{203} | — | November 19, 2006 | Kitt Peak | Spacewatch | · | 900 m | MPC · JPL |
| 535724 | 2015 BJ_{205} | — | February 4, 2011 | Catalina | CSS | · | 1.3 km | MPC · JPL |
| 535725 | 2015 BJ_{206} | — | November 26, 2014 | Haleakala | Pan-STARRS 1 | · | 800 m | MPC · JPL |
| 535726 | 2015 BR_{206} | — | September 30, 2003 | Kitt Peak | Spacewatch | · | 870 m | MPC · JPL |
| 535727 | 2015 BZ_{208} | — | November 18, 2006 | Mount Lemmon | Mount Lemmon Survey | · | 1.5 km | MPC · JPL |
| 535728 | 2015 BC_{210} | — | September 17, 2009 | Mount Lemmon | Mount Lemmon Survey | · | 1.4 km | MPC · JPL |
| 535729 | 2015 BZ_{210} | — | April 20, 2012 | Mount Lemmon | Mount Lemmon Survey | · | 1.0 km | MPC · JPL |
| 535730 | 2015 BK_{211} | — | January 4, 2011 | Mount Lemmon | Mount Lemmon Survey | · | 1.2 km | MPC · JPL |
| 535731 | 2015 BW_{211} | — | February 15, 2010 | Mount Lemmon | Mount Lemmon Survey | EOS | 2.2 km | MPC · JPL |
| 535732 | 2015 BV_{212} | — | December 17, 2014 | Haleakala | Pan-STARRS 1 | · | 2.6 km | MPC · JPL |
| 535733 | 2015 BS_{215} | — | January 30, 2008 | Mount Lemmon | Mount Lemmon Survey | · | 1.0 km | MPC · JPL |
| 535734 | 2015 BC_{219} | — | October 1, 2013 | Mount Lemmon | Mount Lemmon Survey | · | 1.7 km | MPC · JPL |
| 535735 | 2015 BK_{220} | — | December 19, 2009 | Kitt Peak | Spacewatch | · | 2.6 km | MPC · JPL |
| 535736 | 2015 BT_{220} | — | August 28, 2005 | Kitt Peak | Spacewatch | · | 1.1 km | MPC · JPL |
| 535737 | 2015 BU_{220} | — | December 19, 2004 | Kitt Peak | Spacewatch | TRE | 2.5 km | MPC · JPL |
| 535738 | 2015 BJ_{222} | — | March 29, 2011 | Catalina | CSS | · | 1.7 km | MPC · JPL |
| 535739 | 2015 BM_{226} | — | October 1, 2013 | Mount Lemmon | Mount Lemmon Survey | KOR | 990 m | MPC · JPL |
| 535740 | 2015 BW_{226} | — | February 8, 2002 | Kitt Peak | Spacewatch | · | 1.9 km | MPC · JPL |
| 535741 | 2015 BF_{229} | — | September 20, 2009 | Kitt Peak | Spacewatch | · | 1.2 km | MPC · JPL |
| 535742 | 2015 BL_{230} | — | January 26, 2011 | Mount Lemmon | Mount Lemmon Survey | (5) | 1.0 km | MPC · JPL |
| 535743 | 2015 BG_{231} | — | September 30, 2013 | Mount Lemmon | Mount Lemmon Survey | NEM | 2.1 km | MPC · JPL |
| 535744 | 2015 BV_{232} | — | January 11, 2010 | Mount Lemmon | Mount Lemmon Survey | · | 3.5 km | MPC · JPL |
| 535745 | 2015 BB_{234} | — | October 9, 2008 | Mount Lemmon | Mount Lemmon Survey | · | 2.1 km | MPC · JPL |
| 535746 | 2015 BM_{239} | — | March 27, 2008 | Kitt Peak | Spacewatch | · | 1.0 km | MPC · JPL |
| 535747 | 2015 BM_{240} | — | March 31, 2011 | Haleakala | Pan-STARRS 1 | AGN | 1.3 km | MPC · JPL |
| 535748 | 2015 BP_{241} | — | March 30, 2008 | Kitt Peak | Spacewatch | MAS | 600 m | MPC · JPL |
| 535749 | 2015 BD_{242} | — | March 27, 2011 | Mount Lemmon | Mount Lemmon Survey | · | 2.4 km | MPC · JPL |
| 535750 | 2015 BF_{243} | — | January 26, 2006 | Mount Lemmon | Mount Lemmon Survey | GEF | 880 m | MPC · JPL |
| 535751 | 2015 BM_{243} | — | November 26, 2014 | Haleakala | Pan-STARRS 1 | · | 3.2 km | MPC · JPL |
| 535752 | 2015 BE_{244} | — | December 8, 2005 | Kitt Peak | Spacewatch | · | 2.2 km | MPC · JPL |
| 535753 | 2015 BK_{244} | — | October 2, 2013 | Haleakala | Pan-STARRS 1 | · | 1.7 km | MPC · JPL |
| 535754 | 2015 BM_{245} | — | December 19, 2009 | Kitt Peak | Spacewatch | · | 1.5 km | MPC · JPL |
| 535755 | 2015 BM_{247} | — | February 9, 2011 | Mount Lemmon | Mount Lemmon Survey | · | 1.1 km | MPC · JPL |
| 535756 | 2015 BD_{248} | — | January 1, 2003 | Kitt Peak | Spacewatch | · | 920 m | MPC · JPL |
| 535757 | 2015 BN_{248} | — | March 2, 1997 | Kitt Peak | Spacewatch | · | 1.0 km | MPC · JPL |
| 535758 | 2015 BL_{249} | — | December 19, 2004 | Mount Lemmon | Mount Lemmon Survey | · | 1.7 km | MPC · JPL |
| 535759 | 2015 BB_{250} | — | September 9, 2007 | Kitt Peak | Spacewatch | · | 3.2 km | MPC · JPL |
| 535760 | 2015 BP_{250} | — | January 28, 2006 | Kitt Peak | Spacewatch | · | 2.0 km | MPC · JPL |
| 535761 | 2015 BE_{251} | — | January 30, 2008 | Mount Lemmon | Mount Lemmon Survey | · | 570 m | MPC · JPL |
| 535762 | 2015 BM_{251} | — | November 20, 2009 | Kitt Peak | Spacewatch | · | 1.6 km | MPC · JPL |
| 535763 | 2015 BT_{252} | — | January 8, 2011 | Mount Lemmon | Mount Lemmon Survey | · | 1.1 km | MPC · JPL |
| 535764 | 2015 BY_{252} | — | March 29, 2008 | Kitt Peak | Spacewatch | · | 910 m | MPC · JPL |
| 535765 | 2015 BB_{253} | — | November 25, 2013 | Haleakala | Pan-STARRS 1 | · | 2.2 km | MPC · JPL |
| 535766 | 2015 BK_{253} | — | November 7, 2010 | Mount Lemmon | Mount Lemmon Survey | V | 570 m | MPC · JPL |
| 535767 | 2015 BX_{253} | — | February 9, 2010 | Kitt Peak | Spacewatch | · | 4.0 km | MPC · JPL |
| 535768 | 2015 BF_{255} | — | December 1, 2003 | Kitt Peak | Spacewatch | · | 1.5 km | MPC · JPL |
| 535769 Klimkovsky | 2015 BA_{256} | Klimkovsky | January 10, 2011 | Zelenchukskaya | T. V. Krjačko, B. Satovski | MAR | 1.2 km | MPC · JPL |
| 535770 | 2015 BV_{256} | — | October 3, 2013 | Catalina | CSS | · | 2.4 km | MPC · JPL |
| 535771 | 2015 BE_{257} | — | September 13, 2007 | Catalina | CSS | · | 2.9 km | MPC · JPL |
| 535772 | 2015 BZ_{257} | — | October 31, 2008 | Kitt Peak | Spacewatch | EOS | 1.6 km | MPC · JPL |
| 535773 | 2015 BE_{258} | — | November 27, 2014 | Mount Lemmon | Mount Lemmon Survey | EUN | 1.1 km | MPC · JPL |
| 535774 | 2015 BG_{258} | — | January 28, 2004 | Kitt Peak | Spacewatch | · | 3.0 km | MPC · JPL |
| 535775 | 2015 BA_{259} | — | February 23, 2007 | Kitt Peak | Spacewatch | · | 820 m | MPC · JPL |
| 535776 | 2015 BD_{259} | — | January 16, 2004 | Kitt Peak | Spacewatch | · | 3.8 km | MPC · JPL |
| 535777 | 2015 BF_{259} | — | November 30, 2008 | Mount Lemmon | Mount Lemmon Survey | · | 2.7 km | MPC · JPL |
| 535778 | 2015 BG_{259} | — | May 13, 2011 | Mount Lemmon | Mount Lemmon Survey | · | 3.3 km | MPC · JPL |
| 535779 | 2015 BV_{259} | — | July 30, 2008 | Mount Lemmon | Mount Lemmon Survey | MRX | 1.2 km | MPC · JPL |
| 535780 | 2015 BY_{259} | — | August 29, 2006 | Kitt Peak | Spacewatch | · | 650 m | MPC · JPL |
| 535781 | 2015 BY_{260} | — | January 11, 2008 | Mount Lemmon | Mount Lemmon Survey | · | 660 m | MPC · JPL |
| 535782 | 2015 BU_{261} | — | August 29, 2009 | Kitt Peak | Spacewatch | (5) | 1 km | MPC · JPL |
| 535783 | 2015 BA_{262} | — | March 29, 2000 | Kitt Peak | Spacewatch | · | 1.1 km | MPC · JPL |
| 535784 | 2015 BD_{262} | — | November 26, 2014 | Haleakala | Pan-STARRS 1 | (5) | 990 m | MPC · JPL |
| 535785 | 2015 BG_{262} | — | March 2, 2008 | Kitt Peak | Spacewatch | · | 970 m | MPC · JPL |
| 535786 | 2015 BK_{263} | — | November 6, 2005 | Kitt Peak | Spacewatch | · | 1.4 km | MPC · JPL |
| 535787 | 2015 BO_{263} | — | November 12, 2013 | Kitt Peak | Spacewatch | · | 3.5 km | MPC · JPL |
| 535788 | 2015 BS_{263} | — | October 2, 2013 | Kitt Peak | Spacewatch | · | 2.7 km | MPC · JPL |
| 535789 | 2015 BV_{263} | — | November 6, 2013 | Haleakala | Pan-STARRS 1 | · | 1.4 km | MPC · JPL |
| 535790 | 2015 BC_{264} | — | March 27, 2010 | WISE | WISE | CYB | 4.2 km | MPC · JPL |
| 535791 | 2015 BF_{264} | — | October 27, 2005 | Kitt Peak | Spacewatch | · | 910 m | MPC · JPL |
| 535792 | 2015 BR_{264} | — | May 24, 2011 | Haleakala | Pan-STARRS 1 | NAE | 2.3 km | MPC · JPL |
| 535793 | 2015 BC_{266} | — | October 14, 2009 | Mount Lemmon | Mount Lemmon Survey | · | 2.1 km | MPC · JPL |
| 535794 | 2015 BR_{268} | — | April 6, 2011 | Mount Lemmon | Mount Lemmon Survey | · | 2.0 km | MPC · JPL |
| 535795 | 2015 BT_{268} | — | February 12, 2008 | Mount Lemmon | Mount Lemmon Survey | · | 1.1 km | MPC · JPL |
| 535796 | 2015 BK_{269} | — | September 6, 2008 | Catalina | CSS | · | 2.2 km | MPC · JPL |
| 535797 | 2015 BS_{269} | — | November 19, 2009 | Kitt Peak | Spacewatch | · | 1.9 km | MPC · JPL |
| 535798 | 2015 BX_{270} | — | August 26, 2009 | Catalina | CSS | HNS | 1.5 km | MPC · JPL |
| 535799 | 2015 BB_{274} | — | January 19, 2015 | Haleakala | Pan-STARRS 1 | EUN | 1.1 km | MPC · JPL |
| 535800 | 2015 BE_{275} | — | December 20, 2014 | Haleakala | Pan-STARRS 1 | · | 890 m | MPC · JPL |

== 535801–535900 ==
back to top

| Designation | | | Discovery | | | Properties | | Ref |
| Permanent | Provisional | Named after | Date | Site | Discoverer(s) | Category | Diam. | Ref |
|---|---|---|---|---|---|---|---|---|
| 535801 | 2015 BQ_{275} | — | September 18, 2004 | Socorro | LINEAR | GEF | 1.0 km | MPC · JPL |
| 535802 | 2015 BW_{275} | — | January 19, 2015 | Mount Lemmon | Mount Lemmon Survey | · | 1.2 km | MPC · JPL |
| 535803 | 2015 BM_{276} | — | January 19, 2015 | Mount Lemmon | Mount Lemmon Survey | · | 930 m | MPC · JPL |
| 535804 | 2015 BM_{277} | — | January 17, 2007 | Kitt Peak | Spacewatch | · | 890 m | MPC · JPL |
| 535805 | 2015 BV_{278} | — | September 26, 2006 | Mount Lemmon | Mount Lemmon Survey | · | 3.6 km | MPC · JPL |
| 535806 | 2015 BA_{281} | — | October 30, 2008 | Kitt Peak | Spacewatch | NAE | 2.4 km | MPC · JPL |
| 535807 | 2015 BR_{281} | — | October 20, 2001 | Socorro | LINEAR | RAF | 730 m | MPC · JPL |
| 535808 | 2015 BO_{283} | — | March 6, 2008 | Kitt Peak | Spacewatch | · | 850 m | MPC · JPL |
| 535809 | 2015 BR_{283} | — | December 17, 2014 | Haleakala | Pan-STARRS 1 | · | 1.2 km | MPC · JPL |
| 535810 | 2015 BV_{284} | — | September 13, 2007 | Kitt Peak | Spacewatch | · | 2.2 km | MPC · JPL |
| 535811 | 2015 BG_{287} | — | February 15, 2010 | Kitt Peak | Spacewatch | · | 3.9 km | MPC · JPL |
| 535812 | 2015 BW_{287} | — | October 30, 2013 | Haleakala | Pan-STARRS 1 | · | 3.0 km | MPC · JPL |
| 535813 | 2015 BC_{292} | — | January 2, 2011 | Mount Lemmon | Mount Lemmon Survey | · | 950 m | MPC · JPL |
| 535814 | 2015 BJ_{292} | — | November 10, 2009 | Kitt Peak | Spacewatch | · | 1.2 km | MPC · JPL |
| 535815 | 2015 BE_{293} | — | March 20, 2007 | Mount Lemmon | Mount Lemmon Survey | · | 1.3 km | MPC · JPL |
| 535816 | 2015 BE_{295} | — | November 28, 2014 | Haleakala | Pan-STARRS 1 | · | 1.0 km | MPC · JPL |
| 535817 | 2015 BF_{295} | — | August 8, 2012 | Haleakala | Pan-STARRS 1 | EUN | 1.2 km | MPC · JPL |
| 535818 | 2015 BK_{296} | — | September 20, 2009 | Mount Lemmon | Mount Lemmon Survey | (1547) | 1.0 km | MPC · JPL |
| 535819 | 2015 BF_{298} | — | January 19, 2015 | Haleakala | Pan-STARRS 1 | · | 3.1 km | MPC · JPL |
| 535820 | 2015 BF_{299} | — | May 5, 2011 | Mount Lemmon | Mount Lemmon Survey | · | 1.4 km | MPC · JPL |
| 535821 | 2015 BT_{299} | — | April 5, 2003 | Kitt Peak | Spacewatch | · | 930 m | MPC · JPL |
| 535822 | 2015 BC_{300} | — | January 19, 2015 | Haleakala | Pan-STARRS 1 | · | 1.6 km | MPC · JPL |
| 535823 | 2015 BR_{300} | — | January 19, 2015 | Haleakala | Pan-STARRS 1 | · | 1.3 km | MPC · JPL |
| 535824 | 2015 BT_{300} | — | January 12, 2010 | Catalina | CSS | · | 2.1 km | MPC · JPL |
| 535825 | 2015 BV_{300} | — | December 11, 2013 | Haleakala | Pan-STARRS 1 | · | 2.3 km | MPC · JPL |
| 535826 | 2015 BH_{301} | — | October 25, 2009 | Kitt Peak | Spacewatch | · | 2.1 km | MPC · JPL |
| 535827 | 2015 BM_{301} | — | January 19, 2015 | Haleakala | Pan-STARRS 1 | · | 2.2 km | MPC · JPL |
| 535828 | 2015 BR_{301} | — | April 13, 2011 | Haleakala | Pan-STARRS 1 | · | 1.4 km | MPC · JPL |
| 535829 | 2015 BF_{302} | — | October 3, 2013 | Haleakala | Pan-STARRS 1 | · | 1.1 km | MPC · JPL |
| 535830 | 2015 BG_{302} | — | December 29, 2008 | Socorro | LINEAR | · | 3.1 km | MPC · JPL |
| 535831 | 2015 BN_{302} | — | January 2, 2009 | Catalina | CSS | · | 2.8 km | MPC · JPL |
| 535832 | 2015 BD_{303} | — | May 1, 2011 | Haleakala | Pan-STARRS 1 | · | 1.4 km | MPC · JPL |
| 535833 | 2015 BM_{303} | — | November 30, 2005 | Kitt Peak | Spacewatch | · | 1.2 km | MPC · JPL |
| 535834 | 2015 BT_{303} | — | September 14, 2007 | Mount Lemmon | Mount Lemmon Survey | · | 2.0 km | MPC · JPL |
| 535835 | 2015 BH_{304} | — | January 13, 2010 | WISE | WISE | · | 2.9 km | MPC · JPL |
| 535836 | 2015 BJ_{304} | — | April 13, 2004 | Kitt Peak | Spacewatch | · | 1.0 km | MPC · JPL |
| 535837 | 2015 BQ_{304} | — | January 19, 2015 | Haleakala | Pan-STARRS 1 | · | 1.3 km | MPC · JPL |
| 535838 | 2015 BC_{305} | — | April 24, 2011 | Mount Lemmon | Mount Lemmon Survey | (5) | 1.3 km | MPC · JPL |
| 535839 | 2015 BN_{305} | — | October 10, 2012 | Haleakala | Pan-STARRS 1 | · | 2.5 km | MPC · JPL |
| 535840 | 2015 BN_{306} | — | December 18, 2009 | Mount Lemmon | Mount Lemmon Survey | BRA | 1.5 km | MPC · JPL |
| 535841 | 2015 BR_{307} | — | February 12, 2011 | Mount Lemmon | Mount Lemmon Survey | · | 2.4 km | MPC · JPL |
| 535842 | 2015 BT_{307} | — | April 20, 2009 | Mount Lemmon | Mount Lemmon Survey | · | 690 m | MPC · JPL |
| 535843 | 2015 BT_{308} | — | September 10, 2007 | Kitt Peak | Spacewatch | · | 3.0 km | MPC · JPL |
| 535844 | 2015 BY_{310} | — | January 18, 2015 | Haleakala | Pan-STARRS 1 | APO · PHA · fast | 150 m | MPC · JPL |
| 535845 | 2015 BR_{311} | — | December 6, 2005 | Mount Lemmon | Mount Lemmon Survey | · | 1.4 km | MPC · JPL |
| 535846 | 2015 BL_{312} | — | October 3, 2006 | Mount Lemmon | Mount Lemmon Survey | · | 1.3 km | MPC · JPL |
| 535847 | 2015 BO_{312} | — | September 14, 2006 | Kitt Peak | Spacewatch | CYB | 3.2 km | MPC · JPL |
| 535848 | 2015 BO_{313} | — | March 14, 2011 | Mount Lemmon | Mount Lemmon Survey | · | 840 m | MPC · JPL |
| 535849 | 2015 BE_{314} | — | November 9, 2013 | Haleakala | Pan-STARRS 1 | · | 2.1 km | MPC · JPL |
| 535850 | 2015 BF_{314} | — | November 11, 2013 | Mount Lemmon | Mount Lemmon Survey | EOS | 1.7 km | MPC · JPL |
| 535851 | 2015 BZ_{317} | — | October 21, 2003 | Kitt Peak | Spacewatch | · | 600 m | MPC · JPL |
| 535852 | 2015 BE_{320} | — | January 26, 2006 | Mount Lemmon | Mount Lemmon Survey | AST | 1.7 km | MPC · JPL |
| 535853 | 2015 BG_{321} | — | October 11, 2005 | Kitt Peak | Spacewatch | · | 840 m | MPC · JPL |
| 535854 | 2015 BC_{322} | — | August 10, 2007 | Kitt Peak | Spacewatch | EOS | 1.5 km | MPC · JPL |
| 535855 | 2015 BX_{322} | — | July 6, 2013 | Haleakala | Pan-STARRS 1 | BAR | 1.2 km | MPC · JPL |
| 535856 | 2015 BH_{323} | — | March 9, 2007 | Mount Lemmon | Mount Lemmon Survey | BRG | 1.1 km | MPC · JPL |
| 535857 | 2015 BL_{327} | — | October 23, 2006 | Kitt Peak | Spacewatch | NYS | 920 m | MPC · JPL |
| 535858 | 2015 BQ_{327} | — | November 28, 2005 | Mount Lemmon | Mount Lemmon Survey | · | 990 m | MPC · JPL |
| 535859 | 2015 BJ_{329} | — | January 17, 2015 | Haleakala | Pan-STARRS 1 | · | 2.3 km | MPC · JPL |
| 535860 | 2015 BT_{329} | — | August 14, 2012 | Haleakala | Pan-STARRS 1 | · | 2.9 km | MPC · JPL |
| 535861 | 2015 BM_{331} | — | August 13, 2012 | Haleakala | Pan-STARRS 1 | · | 2.4 km | MPC · JPL |
| 535862 | 2015 BP_{331} | — | January 17, 2015 | Haleakala | Pan-STARRS 1 | · | 1.6 km | MPC · JPL |
| 535863 | 2015 BF_{333} | — | November 3, 2010 | Kitt Peak | Spacewatch | · | 1.5 km | MPC · JPL |
| 535864 | 2015 BT_{333} | — | December 2, 2005 | Mauna Kea | A. Boattini | · | 1.5 km | MPC · JPL |
| 535865 | 2015 BX_{334} | — | October 5, 2013 | Kitt Peak | Spacewatch | KOR | 1.4 km | MPC · JPL |
| 535866 | 2015 BV_{335} | — | January 28, 2004 | Kitt Peak | Spacewatch | · | 830 m | MPC · JPL |
| 535867 | 2015 BY_{335} | — | October 8, 2008 | Mount Lemmon | Mount Lemmon Survey | · | 1.4 km | MPC · JPL |
| 535868 | 2015 BZ_{335} | — | January 17, 2015 | Haleakala | Pan-STARRS 1 | NYS | 1.0 km | MPC · JPL |
| 535869 | 2015 BU_{339} | — | September 20, 2009 | Mount Lemmon | Mount Lemmon Survey | · | 900 m | MPC · JPL |
| 535870 | 2015 BA_{341} | — | February 10, 2008 | Mount Lemmon | Mount Lemmon Survey | · | 750 m | MPC · JPL |
| 535871 | 2015 BU_{341} | — | March 1, 2008 | Kitt Peak | Spacewatch | · | 800 m | MPC · JPL |
| 535872 | 2015 BN_{346} | — | February 1, 2008 | Mount Lemmon | Mount Lemmon Survey | · | 690 m | MPC · JPL |
| 535873 | 2015 BP_{346} | — | November 17, 1998 | Kitt Peak | Spacewatch | KOR | 1.4 km | MPC · JPL |
| 535874 | 2015 BY_{346} | — | August 12, 2013 | Haleakala | Pan-STARRS 1 | EUN | 1.1 km | MPC · JPL |
| 535875 | 2015 BG_{349} | — | October 22, 2009 | Mount Lemmon | Mount Lemmon Survey | · | 1.5 km | MPC · JPL |
| 535876 | 2015 BJ_{349} | — | October 10, 2008 | Mount Lemmon | Mount Lemmon Survey | EOS | 1.6 km | MPC · JPL |
| 535877 | 2015 BL_{349} | — | September 23, 2008 | Kitt Peak | Spacewatch | · | 1.6 km | MPC · JPL |
| 535878 | 2015 BD_{352} | — | August 24, 2008 | Kitt Peak | Spacewatch | HOF | 2.3 km | MPC · JPL |
| 535879 | 2015 BF_{352} | — | November 11, 2009 | Kitt Peak | Spacewatch | · | 1.5 km | MPC · JPL |
| 535880 | 2015 BM_{352} | — | January 18, 2015 | Haleakala | Pan-STARRS 1 | · | 2.3 km | MPC · JPL |
| 535881 | 2015 BN_{353} | — | November 26, 2014 | Haleakala | Pan-STARRS 1 | · | 3.0 km | MPC · JPL |
| 535882 | 2015 BO_{353} | — | October 29, 2005 | Kitt Peak | Spacewatch | · | 940 m | MPC · JPL |
| 535883 | 2015 BT_{353} | — | January 30, 2006 | Kitt Peak | Spacewatch | · | 1.4 km | MPC · JPL |
| 535884 | 2015 BB_{354} | — | October 2, 2006 | Kitt Peak | Spacewatch | MAS | 630 m | MPC · JPL |
| 535885 | 2015 BG_{354} | — | October 27, 2009 | Mount Lemmon | Mount Lemmon Survey | · | 1.3 km | MPC · JPL |
| 535886 | 2015 BU_{354} | — | March 11, 2011 | Kitt Peak | Spacewatch | · | 1.0 km | MPC · JPL |
| 535887 | 2015 BN_{355} | — | August 15, 2013 | Haleakala | Pan-STARRS 1 | · | 1.5 km | MPC · JPL |
| 535888 | 2015 BQ_{355} | — | August 14, 2012 | Haleakala | Pan-STARRS 1 | · | 3.0 km | MPC · JPL |
| 535889 | 2015 BS_{356} | — | February 18, 2008 | Mount Lemmon | Mount Lemmon Survey | · | 1.1 km | MPC · JPL |
| 535890 | 2015 BG_{359} | — | October 4, 1999 | Kitt Peak | Spacewatch | · | 1.8 km | MPC · JPL |
| 535891 | 2015 BN_{361} | — | August 21, 2008 | Kitt Peak | Spacewatch | AGN | 1.2 km | MPC · JPL |
| 535892 | 2015 BS_{363} | — | January 23, 2006 | Kitt Peak | Spacewatch | · | 1.7 km | MPC · JPL |
| 535893 | 2015 BO_{365} | — | November 17, 2000 | Kitt Peak | Spacewatch | · | 1.5 km | MPC · JPL |
| 535894 | 2015 BZ_{368} | — | November 5, 2007 | Kitt Peak | Spacewatch | · | 510 m | MPC · JPL |
| 535895 | 2015 BG_{371} | — | October 26, 2009 | Kitt Peak | Spacewatch | · | 2.2 km | MPC · JPL |
| 535896 | 2015 BY_{378} | — | January 20, 2015 | Kitt Peak | Spacewatch | EOS | 2.1 km | MPC · JPL |
| 535897 | 2015 BM_{379} | — | January 23, 2006 | Kitt Peak | Spacewatch | · | 1.6 km | MPC · JPL |
| 535898 | 2015 BT_{383} | — | May 9, 2006 | Mount Lemmon | Mount Lemmon Survey | · | 1.7 km | MPC · JPL |
| 535899 | 2015 BB_{387} | — | November 25, 2005 | Kitt Peak | Spacewatch | MIS | 1.9 km | MPC · JPL |
| 535900 | 2015 BQ_{393} | — | December 3, 2010 | Mount Lemmon | Mount Lemmon Survey | V | 480 m | MPC · JPL |

== 535901–536000 ==
back to top

| Designation | | | Discovery | | | Properties | | Ref |
| Permanent | Provisional | Named after | Date | Site | Discoverer(s) | Category | Diam. | Ref |
|---|---|---|---|---|---|---|---|---|
| 535901 | 2015 BD_{397} | — | March 15, 2012 | Kitt Peak | Spacewatch | NYS | 740 m | MPC · JPL |
| 535902 | 2015 BU_{407} | — | March 15, 2010 | WISE | WISE | · | 1.9 km | MPC · JPL |
| 535903 | 2015 BR_{408} | — | September 26, 2005 | Kitt Peak | Spacewatch | · | 1.2 km | MPC · JPL |
| 535904 | 2015 BX_{410} | — | February 21, 2006 | Mount Lemmon | Mount Lemmon Survey | · | 1.6 km | MPC · JPL |
| 535905 | 2015 BD_{411} | — | January 2, 2011 | Mount Lemmon | Mount Lemmon Survey | · | 1.2 km | MPC · JPL |
| 535906 | 2015 BP_{413} | — | March 10, 2008 | Mount Lemmon | Mount Lemmon Survey | · | 1.1 km | MPC · JPL |
| 535907 | 2015 BU_{414} | — | August 28, 2013 | Mount Lemmon | Mount Lemmon Survey | · | 1.0 km | MPC · JPL |
| 535908 | 2015 BP_{415} | — | March 9, 2011 | Mount Lemmon | Mount Lemmon Survey | · | 840 m | MPC · JPL |
| 535909 | 2015 BT_{418} | — | September 30, 2013 | Mount Lemmon | Mount Lemmon Survey | · | 1.9 km | MPC · JPL |
| 535910 | 2015 BO_{421} | — | January 14, 2011 | Mount Lemmon | Mount Lemmon Survey | · | 1.1 km | MPC · JPL |
| 535911 | 2015 BC_{422} | — | January 8, 2010 | Kitt Peak | Spacewatch | · | 1.5 km | MPC · JPL |
| 535912 | 2015 BS_{425} | — | January 27, 2007 | Mount Lemmon | Mount Lemmon Survey | · | 670 m | MPC · JPL |
| 535913 | 2015 BD_{429} | — | September 22, 2008 | Kitt Peak | Spacewatch | KOR | 1.2 km | MPC · JPL |
| 535914 | 2015 BE_{429} | — | October 27, 2008 | Kitt Peak | Spacewatch | KOR | 1.3 km | MPC · JPL |
| 535915 | 2015 BW_{430} | — | July 19, 2004 | Anderson Mesa | LONEOS | · | 1.4 km | MPC · JPL |
| 535916 | 2015 BH_{431} | — | October 20, 2006 | Kitt Peak | Spacewatch | · | 810 m | MPC · JPL |
| 535917 | 2015 BN_{431} | — | June 10, 2010 | WISE | WISE | · | 3.9 km | MPC · JPL |
| 535918 | 2015 BT_{431} | — | February 22, 2011 | Kitt Peak | Spacewatch | · | 1.6 km | MPC · JPL |
| 535919 | 2015 BJ_{432} | — | December 22, 2006 | Kitt Peak | Spacewatch | · | 1.2 km | MPC · JPL |
| 535920 | 2015 BK_{432} | — | September 3, 2013 | Kitt Peak | Spacewatch | · | 1.5 km | MPC · JPL |
| 535921 | 2015 BQ_{433} | — | February 13, 2011 | Mount Lemmon | Mount Lemmon Survey | · | 1.3 km | MPC · JPL |
| 535922 | 2015 BS_{434} | — | January 20, 2015 | Haleakala | Pan-STARRS 1 | · | 1.2 km | MPC · JPL |
| 535923 | 2015 BX_{435} | — | January 29, 2011 | Mount Lemmon | Mount Lemmon Survey | · | 940 m | MPC · JPL |
| 535924 | 2015 BE_{437} | — | November 4, 2004 | Kitt Peak | Spacewatch | · | 1.5 km | MPC · JPL |
| 535925 | 2015 BO_{437} | — | November 25, 2006 | Kitt Peak | Spacewatch | MAS | 690 m | MPC · JPL |
| 535926 | 2015 BC_{439} | — | August 15, 2013 | Haleakala | Pan-STARRS 1 | · | 800 m | MPC · JPL |
| 535927 | 2015 BJ_{440} | — | September 12, 2007 | Catalina | CSS | · | 2.9 km | MPC · JPL |
| 535928 | 2015 BM_{440} | — | February 13, 2008 | Mount Lemmon | Mount Lemmon Survey | · | 740 m | MPC · JPL |
| 535929 | 2015 BV_{440} | — | October 8, 2008 | Kitt Peak | Spacewatch | · | 1.5 km | MPC · JPL |
| 535930 | 2015 BB_{441} | — | September 19, 1995 | Kitt Peak | Spacewatch | (17392) | 1.6 km | MPC · JPL |
| 535931 | 2015 BC_{441} | — | January 20, 2015 | Haleakala | Pan-STARRS 1 | · | 1.3 km | MPC · JPL |
| 535932 | 2015 BZ_{441} | — | October 23, 2008 | Kitt Peak | Spacewatch | KOR | 1.1 km | MPC · JPL |
| 535933 | 2015 BK_{442} | — | February 9, 2005 | Kitt Peak | Spacewatch | · | 1.8 km | MPC · JPL |
| 535934 | 2015 BO_{442} | — | October 25, 2005 | Catalina | CSS | · | 1.2 km | MPC · JPL |
| 535935 | 2015 BS_{442} | — | October 28, 2013 | Mount Lemmon | Mount Lemmon Survey | VER | 2.5 km | MPC · JPL |
| 535936 | 2015 BV_{442} | — | August 17, 2012 | Haleakala | Pan-STARRS 1 | · | 3.1 km | MPC · JPL |
| 535937 | 2015 BJ_{443} | — | January 20, 2015 | Haleakala | Pan-STARRS 1 | · | 1.4 km | MPC · JPL |
| 535938 | 2015 BX_{443} | — | March 26, 2008 | Mount Lemmon | Mount Lemmon Survey | · | 750 m | MPC · JPL |
| 535939 | 2015 BD_{444} | — | February 26, 2008 | Mount Lemmon | Mount Lemmon Survey | · | 700 m | MPC · JPL |
| 535940 | 2015 BG_{444} | — | October 9, 2008 | Kitt Peak | Spacewatch | · | 1.6 km | MPC · JPL |
| 535941 | 2015 BP_{444} | — | August 13, 2012 | Siding Spring | SSS | EUN | 1.0 km | MPC · JPL |
| 535942 | 2015 BD_{445} | — | September 19, 2012 | Mount Lemmon | Mount Lemmon Survey | · | 2.5 km | MPC · JPL |
| 535943 | 2015 BF_{445} | — | September 19, 1995 | Kitt Peak | Spacewatch | · | 3.1 km | MPC · JPL |
| 535944 | 2015 BG_{445} | — | January 28, 2004 | Kitt Peak | Spacewatch | · | 2.2 km | MPC · JPL |
| 535945 | 2015 BU_{445} | — | October 1, 2005 | Mount Lemmon | Mount Lemmon Survey | · | 940 m | MPC · JPL |
| 535946 | 2015 BL_{446} | — | November 14, 1995 | Kitt Peak | Spacewatch | AEO | 850 m | MPC · JPL |
| 535947 | 2015 BQ_{446} | — | March 10, 2008 | Kitt Peak | Spacewatch | V | 490 m | MPC · JPL |
| 535948 | 2015 BW_{446} | — | February 16, 2004 | Kitt Peak | Spacewatch | · | 2.8 km | MPC · JPL |
| 535949 | 2015 BH_{449} | — | October 7, 2013 | Kitt Peak | Spacewatch | · | 740 m | MPC · JPL |
| 535950 | 2015 BW_{449} | — | November 7, 2010 | Mount Lemmon | Mount Lemmon Survey | · | 1.0 km | MPC · JPL |
| 535951 | 2015 BY_{450} | — | January 20, 2015 | Haleakala | Pan-STARRS 1 | · | 2.6 km | MPC · JPL |
| 535952 | 2015 BV_{451} | — | January 18, 2009 | Mount Lemmon | Mount Lemmon Survey | · | 2.5 km | MPC · JPL |
| 535953 | 2015 BE_{453} | — | February 25, 2011 | Mount Lemmon | Mount Lemmon Survey | · | 1.1 km | MPC · JPL |
| 535954 | 2015 BL_{453} | — | January 30, 2004 | Kitt Peak | Spacewatch | · | 710 m | MPC · JPL |
| 535955 | 2015 BM_{453} | — | December 14, 2010 | Mount Lemmon | Mount Lemmon Survey | MAS | 620 m | MPC · JPL |
| 535956 | 2015 BF_{454} | — | September 14, 2013 | Haleakala | Pan-STARRS 1 | · | 1.1 km | MPC · JPL |
| 535957 | 2015 BW_{457} | — | August 19, 2006 | Kitt Peak | Spacewatch | · | 3.0 km | MPC · JPL |
| 535958 | 2015 BL_{458} | — | February 23, 2007 | Mount Lemmon | Mount Lemmon Survey | · | 890 m | MPC · JPL |
| 535959 | 2015 BK_{459} | — | February 25, 2006 | Mount Lemmon | Mount Lemmon Survey | AST | 1.7 km | MPC · JPL |
| 535960 | 2015 BW_{462} | — | October 23, 2008 | Kitt Peak | Spacewatch | · | 1.3 km | MPC · JPL |
| 535961 | 2015 BL_{465} | — | May 22, 2006 | Kitt Peak | Spacewatch | · | 2.1 km | MPC · JPL |
| 535962 | 2015 BH_{466} | — | December 14, 2010 | Mount Lemmon | Mount Lemmon Survey | · | 760 m | MPC · JPL |
| 535963 | 2015 BL_{466} | — | January 20, 2015 | Haleakala | Pan-STARRS 1 | ADE | 1.5 km | MPC · JPL |
| 535964 | 2015 BF_{467} | — | January 20, 2015 | Haleakala | Pan-STARRS 1 | MAR | 860 m | MPC · JPL |
| 535965 | 2015 BZ_{467} | — | December 20, 2009 | Mount Lemmon | Mount Lemmon Survey | · | 1.6 km | MPC · JPL |
| 535966 | 2015 BC_{468} | — | November 10, 2013 | Mount Lemmon | Mount Lemmon Survey | · | 2.2 km | MPC · JPL |
| 535967 | 2015 BH_{468} | — | December 25, 2005 | Kitt Peak | Spacewatch | · | 1.4 km | MPC · JPL |
| 535968 | 2015 BM_{468} | — | April 2, 2010 | WISE | WISE | · | 1.8 km | MPC · JPL |
| 535969 | 2015 BS_{468} | — | August 10, 2007 | Kitt Peak | Spacewatch | · | 2.2 km | MPC · JPL |
| 535970 | 2015 BU_{468} | — | January 18, 2015 | Haleakala | Pan-STARRS 1 | · | 1.2 km | MPC · JPL |
| 535971 | 2015 BC_{469} | — | November 1, 2005 | Mount Lemmon | Mount Lemmon Survey | · | 1.5 km | MPC · JPL |
| 535972 | 2015 BF_{469} | — | November 27, 2014 | Haleakala | Pan-STARRS 1 | · | 1.9 km | MPC · JPL |
| 535973 | 2015 BY_{472} | — | August 3, 2008 | La Sagra | OAM | · | 2.6 km | MPC · JPL |
| 535974 | 2015 BX_{477} | — | October 9, 2010 | Catalina | CSS | · | 820 m | MPC · JPL |
| 535975 | 2015 BY_{484} | — | January 20, 2015 | Haleakala | Pan-STARRS 1 | · | 1 km | MPC · JPL |
| 535976 | 2015 BH_{485} | — | September 22, 2012 | Mount Lemmon | Mount Lemmon Survey | · | 3.1 km | MPC · JPL |
| 535977 | 2015 BS_{493} | — | February 6, 2002 | Kitt Peak | Spacewatch | · | 1.4 km | MPC · JPL |
| 535978 | 2015 BC_{496} | — | October 25, 2009 | Kitt Peak | Spacewatch | · | 1.1 km | MPC · JPL |
| 535979 | 2015 BM_{496} | — | September 24, 1995 | Kitt Peak | Spacewatch | · | 2.9 km | MPC · JPL |
| 535980 | 2015 BR_{499} | — | August 13, 2012 | Haleakala | Pan-STARRS 1 | · | 2.0 km | MPC · JPL |
| 535981 | 2015 BV_{499} | — | April 13, 2008 | Mount Lemmon | Mount Lemmon Survey | · | 730 m | MPC · JPL |
| 535982 | 2015 BB_{502} | — | November 11, 2010 | Mount Lemmon | Mount Lemmon Survey | · | 750 m | MPC · JPL |
| 535983 | 2015 BL_{507} | — | December 30, 2008 | Mount Lemmon | Mount Lemmon Survey | · | 2.9 km | MPC · JPL |
| 535984 | 2015 BK_{513} | — | October 31, 2010 | Mount Lemmon | Mount Lemmon Survey | NYS | 920 m | MPC · JPL |
| 535985 | 2015 BF_{515} | — | January 16, 2015 | Haleakala | Pan-STARRS 1 | centaur | 60 km | MPC · JPL |
| 535986 | 2015 BN_{518} | — | January 18, 2015 | Haleakala | Pan-STARRS 1 | cubewano (hot) | 202 km | MPC · JPL |
| 535987 | 2015 BO_{518} | — | January 20, 2015 | Haleakala | Pan-STARRS 1 | cubewano (hot) | 202 km | MPC · JPL |
| 535988 | 2015 BU_{518} | — | January 28, 2015 | Haleakala | Pan-STARRS 1 | res · 4:7 | 118 km | MPC · JPL |
| 535989 | 2015 BV_{518} | — | January 17, 2015 | Haleakala | Pan-STARRS 1 | cubewano (cold) | 246 km | MPC · JPL |
| 535990 | 2015 BW_{518} | — | January 17, 2015 | Haleakala | Pan-STARRS 1 | cubewano (hot) | 218 km | MPC · JPL |
| 535991 | 2015 BD_{519} | — | January 16, 2015 | Haleakala | Pan-STARRS 1 | res · 2:5 | 236 km | MPC · JPL |
| 535992 | 2015 BF_{519} | — | January 21, 2015 | Haleakala | Pan-STARRS 1 | other TNO | 106 km | MPC · JPL |
| 535993 | 2015 BG_{519} | — | January 23, 2015 | Haleakala | Pan-STARRS 1 | other TNO | 192 km | MPC · JPL |
| 535994 | 2015 BH_{519} | — | January 23, 2015 | Haleakala | Pan-STARRS 1 | SDO | 207 km | MPC · JPL |
| 535995 | 2015 BK_{529} | — | September 26, 2013 | Catalina | CSS | PHO | 810 m | MPC · JPL |
| 535996 | 2015 BT_{529} | — | January 18, 2015 | Haleakala | Pan-STARRS 1 | · | 2.5 km | MPC · JPL |
| 535997 | 2015 BX_{529} | — | February 4, 2006 | Catalina | CSS | · | 1.4 km | MPC · JPL |
| 535998 | 2015 BY_{529} | — | January 20, 2015 | Mount Lemmon | Mount Lemmon Survey | HNS | 880 m | MPC · JPL |
| 535999 | 2015 BU_{530} | — | January 21, 2015 | Haleakala | Pan-STARRS 1 | GEF | 1.2 km | MPC · JPL |
| 536000 | 2015 BH_{531} | — | May 29, 2010 | WISE | WISE | · | 2.0 km | MPC · JPL |

back to top

== Meaning of names ==
As minor planet discoveries are confirmed, they are given a permanent number by the IAU's Minor Planet Center (MPC), and the discoverers can then submit names for them, following the IAU's naming conventions. The list below concerns those minor planets in the specified number-range that have received names, and explains the meanings of those names.

Official naming citations of newly named small Solar System bodies are approved and published in a bulletin by IAU's Working Group for Small Bodies Nomenclature (WGSBN). Before May 2021, citations were published in MPC's Minor Planet Circulars for many decades. Recent citations can also be found on the JPL Small-Body Database (SBDB). Until his death in 2016, German astronomer Lutz D. Schmadel compiled these citations into the Dictionary of Minor Planet Names (DMP) and regularly updated the collection.

Based on Paul Herget's The Names of the Minor Planets, Schmadel also researched the unclear origin of numerous asteroids, most of which had been named prior to World War II. This article incorporates text from this source, which is in the public domain: SBDB New namings may only be added to this list below after official publication as the preannouncement of names is condemned. The WGSBN publishes a comprehensive guideline for the naming rules of non-cometary small Solar System bodies.

| Named minor planet | Provisional | This minor planet was named for... | Ref · Catalog |
|---|---|---|---|
| 535266 Chorzów | 2014 YE_{57} | Chorzów, town in southern Poland, in the Silesian Voivoideship, located on the Rawa river. | IAU · 535266 |
| 535353 Antoniwilk | 2015 AP_{68} | Antoni Wilk (1876–1940), a Polish astronomer, educator and discoverer of comets, who was awarded with the comet medal of the Astronomical Society of the Pacific and the Order of Polonia Restituta. | IAU · 535353 |
| 535530 Gustavborn | 2015 BQ_{26} | Gustav Born, the son of Nobel Prize laureate Max Born. Gustav was a German pharmacologist who invented the Born aggregometer and revolutionized the study of platelets. | IAU · 535530 |
| 535769 Klimkovsky | 2015 BA_{256} | Andrey Vladimirovich Klimkovsky, Russian composer, electronic music performer, experienced astronomy enthusiast, science communicator, and marathon runner. | IAU · 535769 |
