= New Horizons =

NASA space probe launched in 2006

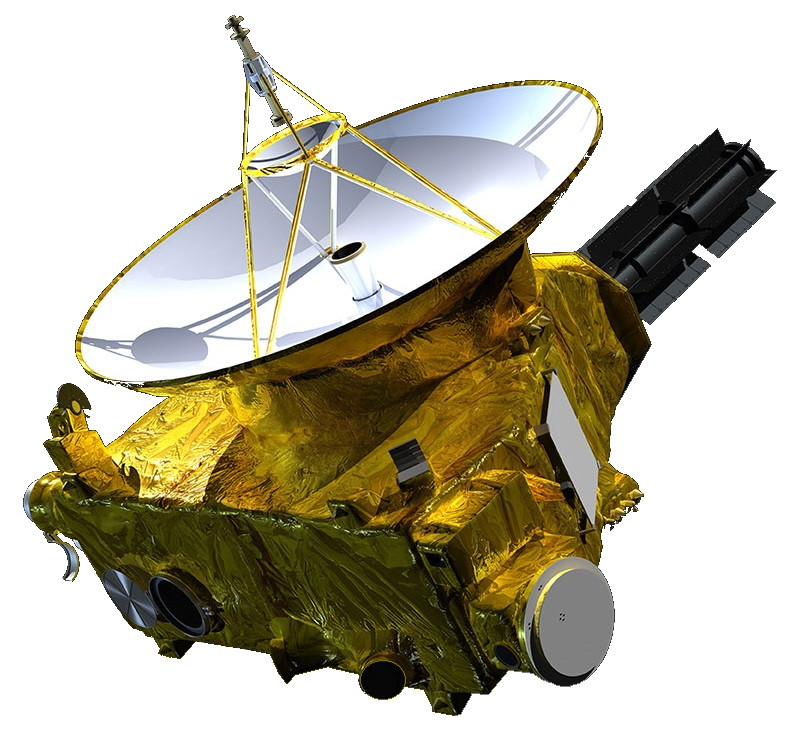
- Names: New Frontiers 1
- Mission type: Pluto/Arrokoth flyby
- Operator: NASA
- COSPAR ID: 2006-001A
- SATCAT no.: 28928
- Website: pluto.jhuapl.edu science.nasa.gov
- Mission duration: 9.5 years (planned); 20 years, 10 months, 3 days (elapsed)

Spacecraft properties
- Manufacturer: APL / SwRI
- Launch mass: 478 kg (1,054 lb)
- Dry mass: 401 kg (884 lb)
- Payload mass: 30.4 kg (67 lb)
- Dimensions: 2.2 × 2.1 × 2.7 m (7.2 × 6.9 × 8.9 ft)
- Power: 245 watts

Start of mission
- Launch date: January 19, 2006, 19:00:00.221 UTC (2:00 pm EST)
- Rocket: Atlas V (551) AV-010
- Launch site: Cape Canaveral, SLC‑41
- Contractor: International Launch Services

Orbital parameters
- Eccentricity: 1.41905
- Inclination: 2.23014°
- Epoch: January 1, 2017 (JD 2457754.5)

Flyby of 132524 APL (incidental)
- Closest approach: June 13, 2006, 04:05 UTC
- Distance: 101,867 km (63,297 mi)

Flyby of Jupiter (gravity assist)
- Closest approach: February 28, 2007, 05:43:40 UTC
- Distance: 2,300,000 km (1,400,000 mi)

Flyby of Pluto
- Closest approach: July 14, 2015, 11:49:57 UTC
- Distance: 12,500 km (7,800 mi)

Flyby of Charon (moon)
- Closest approach: July 14, 2015, 12:02:22 UTC
- Distance: 29,431 km (18,288 mi)

Flyby of 486958 Arrokoth
- Closest approach: January 1, 2019, 05:33:00 UTC
- Distance: 3,500 km (2,200 mi)
Instruments
- Alice: Ultraviolet Imaging Spectrometer
- LORRI: Long-Range Reconnaissance Imager
- SWAP: Solar Wind Around Pluto
- PEPSSI: Pluto Energetic Particle Spectrometer Science Investigation
- REX: Radio Science Experiment
- Ralph: Ralph Telescope
- SDC: Venetia Burney Student Dust Counter
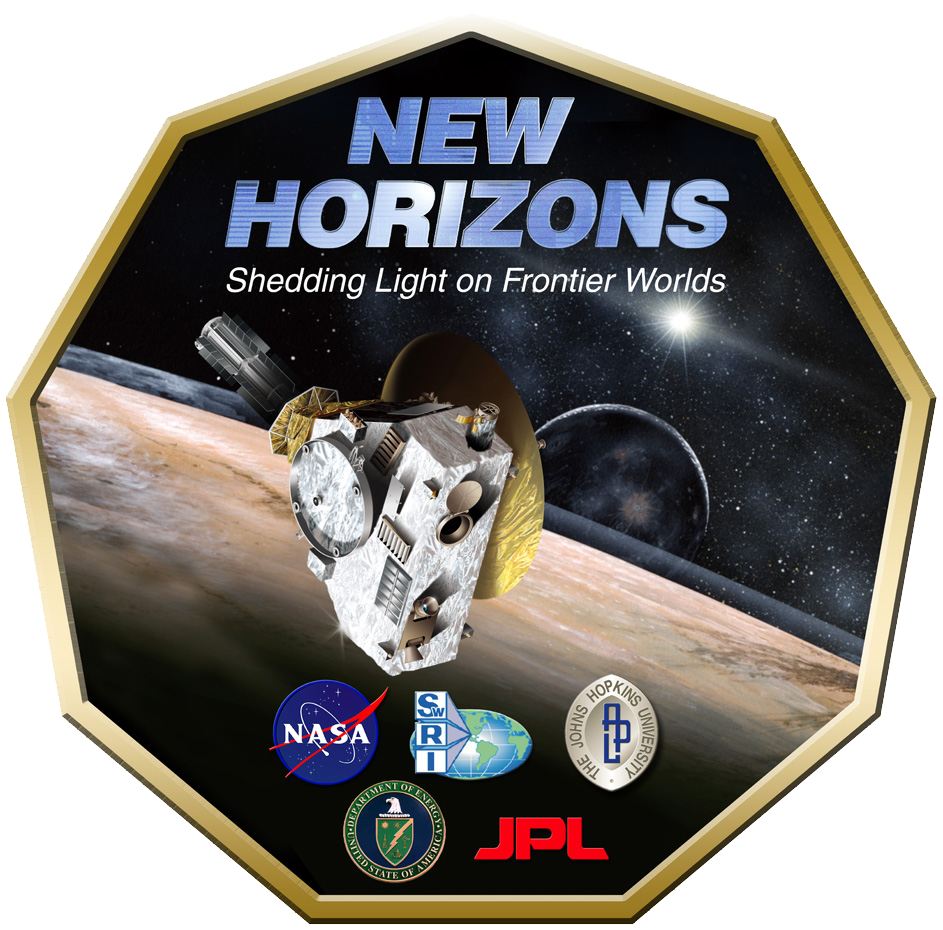
- Official mission logo New Frontiers

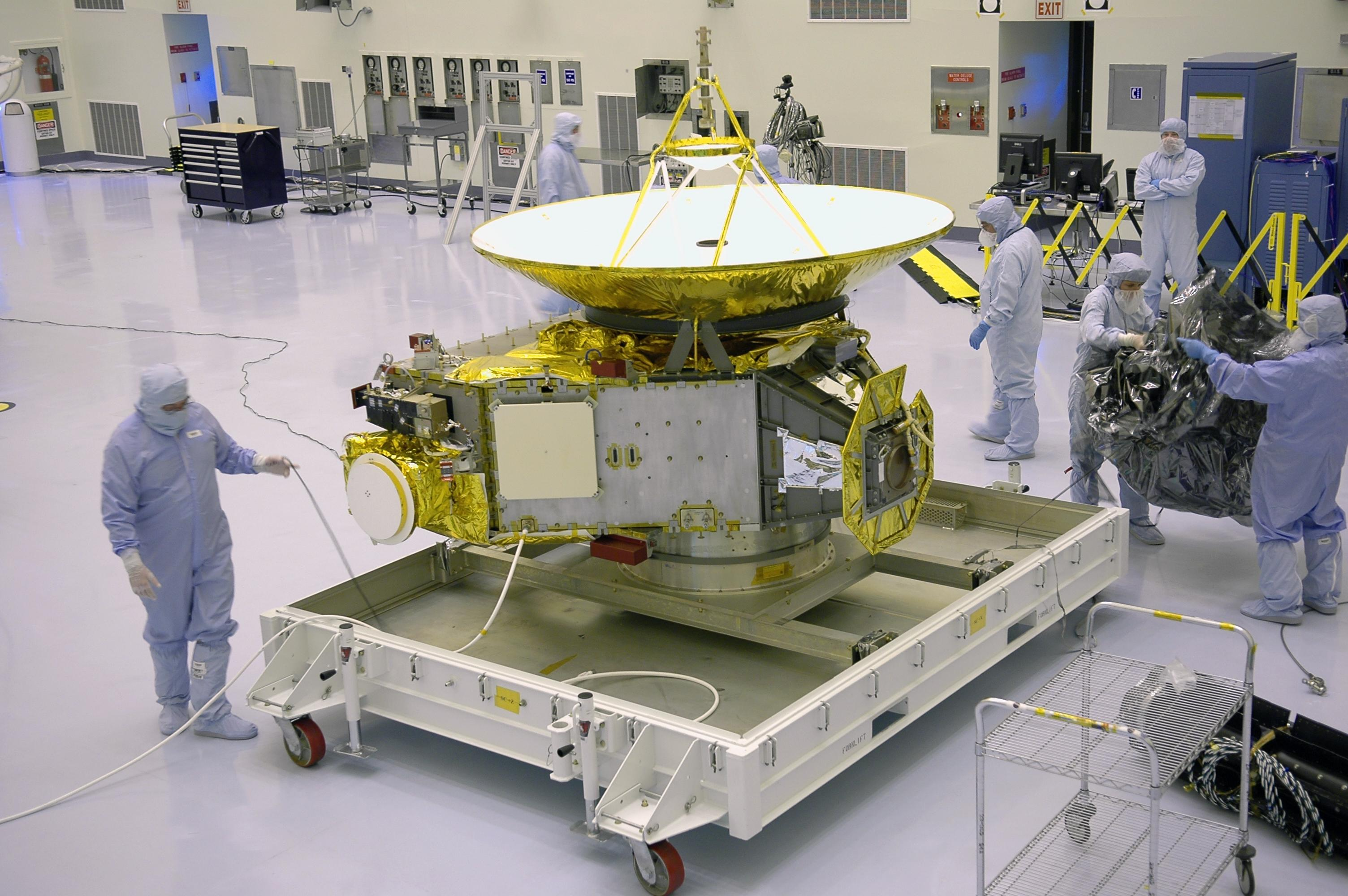
New Horizons before launch

New Horizons is an interplanetary space probe launched as a part of NASA's New Frontiers program. Launched in 2006, it became the first spacecraft to perform a flyby study and capture high-resolution photographs of Pluto and its moons during its encounter.

It was engineered by the Johns Hopkins University Applied Physics Laboratory (APL) and the Southwest Research Institute (SwRI), with a team led by Alan Stern. New Horizons is the fifth space probe to achieve the escape velocity needed to leave the Solar System.

On January 19, 2006, New Horizons was launched from Cape Canaveral Space Force Station by an Atlas V rocket directly into an Earth-and-solar escape trajectory with a speed of about 16.26 km/s (10.10 mi/s; 58,500 km/h; 36,400 mph) relative to the Sun. It was the fastest (average speed with respect to Earth) human-made object ever launched from Earth. It is not the fastest speed recorded for a spacecraft, which, as of 2026, is that of the Parker Solar Probe. After a brief encounter with asteroid 132524 APL, New Horizons proceeded to Jupiter, making its closest approach on February 28, 2007, at a distance of 2.3 million kilometers (1.4 million miles). The Jupiter flyby provided a gravity assist that increased New Horizons' speed; the flyby also enabled a general test of New Horizons' scientific capabilities, returning data about the planet's atmosphere, moons, and magnetosphere.

Most of the post-Jupiter voyage was spent in hibernation mode to preserve onboard systems, except for brief annual checkouts. On December 6, 2014, New Horizons was brought back online for the Pluto encounter, and instrument check-out began. On January 15, 2015, the spacecraft began its approach phase to Pluto.

On July 14, 2015, at 11:49 UTC, it flew 12,500 km (7,800 mi) above the surface of Pluto, which at the time was 34 AU from the Sun, making it the first spacecraft to explore the dwarf planet. In August 2016, New Horizons was reported to have traveled at speeds of more than 84,000 km/h (52,000 mph). On October 25, 2016, at 21:48 UTC, the last recorded data from the Pluto flyby was received from New Horizons. Having completed its flyby of Pluto, New Horizons then maneuvered for a flyby of Kuiper belt object 486958 Arrokoth (then nicknamed Ultima Thule), which occurred on January 1, 2019, when it was 43.4 AU (6.49 billion km; 4.03 billion mi) from the Sun. In August 2018, NASA cited results by Alice on New Horizons to confirm the existence of a "hydrogen wall" at the outer edges of the Solar System. This "wall" was first detected in 1992 by the two Voyager spacecraft.

New Horizons is traveling through the Kuiper belt; it is 64.21 AU (9.61 billion km; 5.97 billion mi) from Earth and 64.45 AU (9.64 billion km; 5.99 billion mi) from the Sun as of April 2026. NASA has announced its plan to extend operations for New Horizons until the spacecraft exits the Kuiper belt, which is expected to occur in either 2028 or 2029. The White House's proposed budget for FY2026 would have cut funding for New Horizons, but the continued funding of the mission was heavily debated in the United States Congress and a final budget of 24.44 billion USD guaranteed the mission continuation.

== History ==
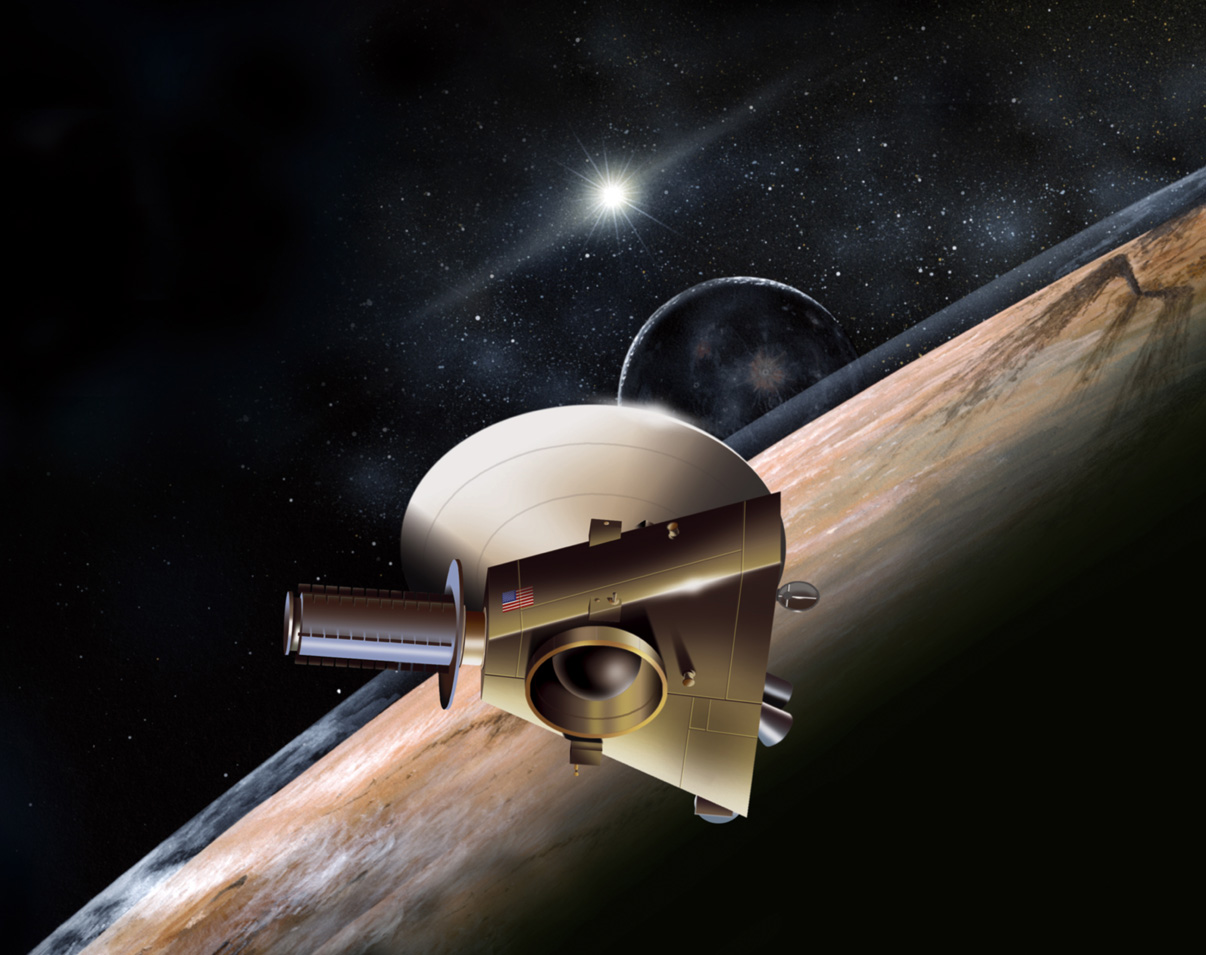
Early concept art of the New Horizons spacecraft. The mission, led by the Applied Physics Laboratory and Alan Stern, eventually became the first mission to Pluto.

In August 1992, JPL scientist Robert Staehle called Pluto discoverer Clyde Tombaugh, requesting permission to visit his planet. "I told him he was welcome to it," Tombaugh later remembered, "though he's got to go one long, cold trip." The call eventually led to a series of proposed Pluto missions leading up to New Horizons.

Stamatios "Tom" Krimigis, head of the Applied Physics Laboratory's space division, one of many entrants in the New Frontiers Program competition, formed the New Horizons team with Alan Stern in December 2000. Appointed as the project's principal investigator, Stern was described by Krimigis as "the personification of the Pluto mission". New Horizons was based largely on Stern's work since Pluto 350 and involved most of the team from Pluto Kuiper Express.

The New Horizons proposal was one of five that were officially submitted to NASA. It was later selected as one of two finalists to be subject to a three-month concept study in June 2001. The other finalist, POSSE (Pluto and Outer Solar System Explorer), was a separate but similar Pluto mission concept by the University of Colorado Boulder, led by principal investigator Larry W. Esposito, and supported by the JPL, Lockheed Martin and the University of California.

However, the APL, in addition to being supported by Pluto Kuiper Express developers at the Goddard Space Flight Center and Stanford University were at an advantage; they had recently developed NEAR Shoemaker for NASA, which had successfully entered orbit around 433 Eros earlier that year, and would later land on the asteroid to scientific and engineering fanfare.

In November 2001, New Horizons was officially selected for funding as part of the New Frontiers program. However, the new NASA Administrator appointed by the Bush administration, Sean O'Keefe, was not supportive of New Horizons and effectively canceled it by not including it in NASA's budget for 2003. NASA's Associate Administrator for the Science Mission Directorate, Ed Weiler, prompted Stern to lobby for the funding of New Horizons in hopes of the mission appearing in the Planetary Science Decadal Survey, a prioritized "wish list", compiled by the United States National Research Council, that reflects the opinions of the scientific community.

After an intense campaign to gain support for New Horizons, the Planetary Science Decadal Survey of 2003–2013 was published in the summer of 2002. New Horizons topped the list of projects considered the highest priority among the scientific community in the medium-size category; ahead of missions to the Moon, and even Jupiter. Weiler stated that it was a result that "[his] administration was not going to fight". Funding for the mission was finally secured following the publication of the report. Stern's team was finally able to start building the spacecraft and its instruments, with a planned launch in January 2006 and arrival at Pluto in 2015. Alice Bowman became Mission Operations Manager (MOM).

== Mission profile ==
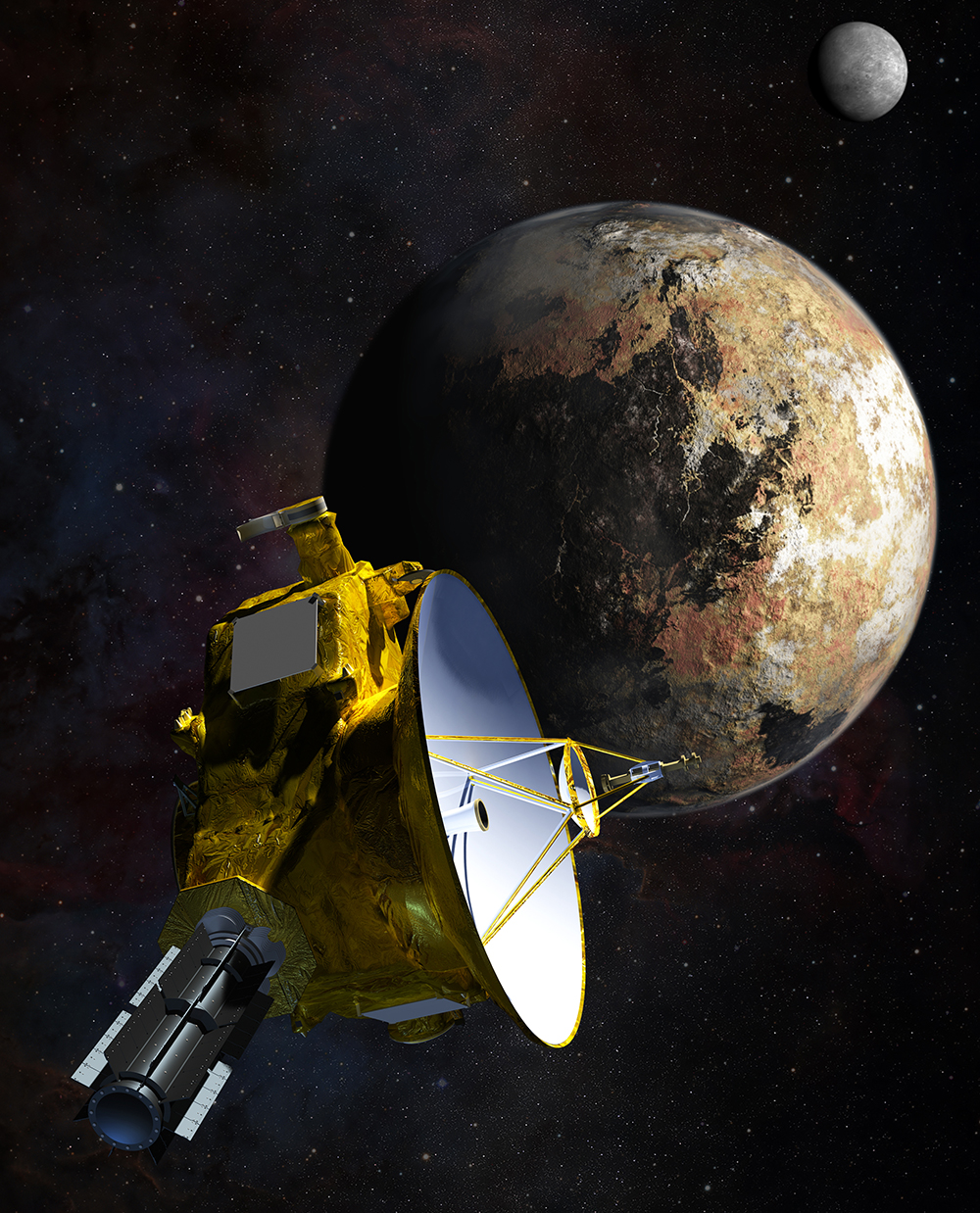
An artist's impression of New Horizons' close encounter with the Plutonian system

New Horizons is the first mission in NASA's New Frontiers mission category, larger and more expensive than the Discovery missions but smaller than the missions of the Flagship Program. The cost of the mission, including spacecraft and instrument development, launch vehicle, mission operations, data analysis, and education/public outreach, is approximately $700 million over 15 years (2001–2016). The spacecraft was built primarily by Southwest Research Institute (SwRI) and the Johns Hopkins Applied Physics Laboratory. The mission's principal investigator is Alan Stern of the Southwest Research Institute (formerly NASA Associate Administrator).

After separation from the launch vehicle, overall control was taken by Mission Operations Center (MOC) at the Applied Physics Laboratory in Howard County, Maryland. The science instruments are operated at Clyde Tombaugh Science Operations Center (T-SOC) in Boulder, Colorado. Navigation is performed at various contractor facilities, whereas the navigational positional data and related celestial reference frames are provided by the Naval Observatory Flagstaff Station through Headquarters NASA and JPL.

KinetX is the lead on the New Horizons navigation team and is responsible for planning trajectory adjustments as the spacecraft speeds toward the outer Solar System. Coincidentally the Naval Observatory Flagstaff Station was where the photographic plates were taken for the discovery of Pluto's moon Charon. The Naval Observatory itself is not far from the Lowell Observatory where Pluto was discovered.

New Horizons was originally planned as a voyage to the only unexplored planet in the Solar System. When the spacecraft was launched, Pluto was still classified as a planet, later to be reclassified as a dwarf planet by the International Astronomical Union (IAU). Some members of the New Horizons team, including Alan Stern, disagree with the IAU definition and still describe Pluto as the ninth planet. Pluto's satellites Nix and Hydra also have a connection with the spacecraft: the first letters of their names (N and H) are the initials of New Horizons. The moons' discoverers chose these names for this reason, plus Nix and Hydra's relationship to the mythological Pluto.

=== Mementos ===
In addition to the science equipment, there are nine cultural artifacts traveling with the spacecraft. These include a collection of 434,738 names stored on a compact disc, a collection of images of New Horizons project personnel on another CD, a piece of Scaled Composites's SpaceShipOne, a "Not Yet Explored" USPS stamp, and two copies of the Flag of the United States.

About 30 grams (1 oz) of Clyde Tombaugh's ashes are aboard the spacecraft, to commemorate his discovery of Pluto in 1930. A Florida state quarter coin, whose design commemorates human exploration, is included, officially as a trim weight, as is a Maryland state quarter to honor the probe's builders. One of the science packages (a dust counter) is named after Venetia Burney, who, as a child, suggested the name "Pluto" after its discovery.

== Goal ==
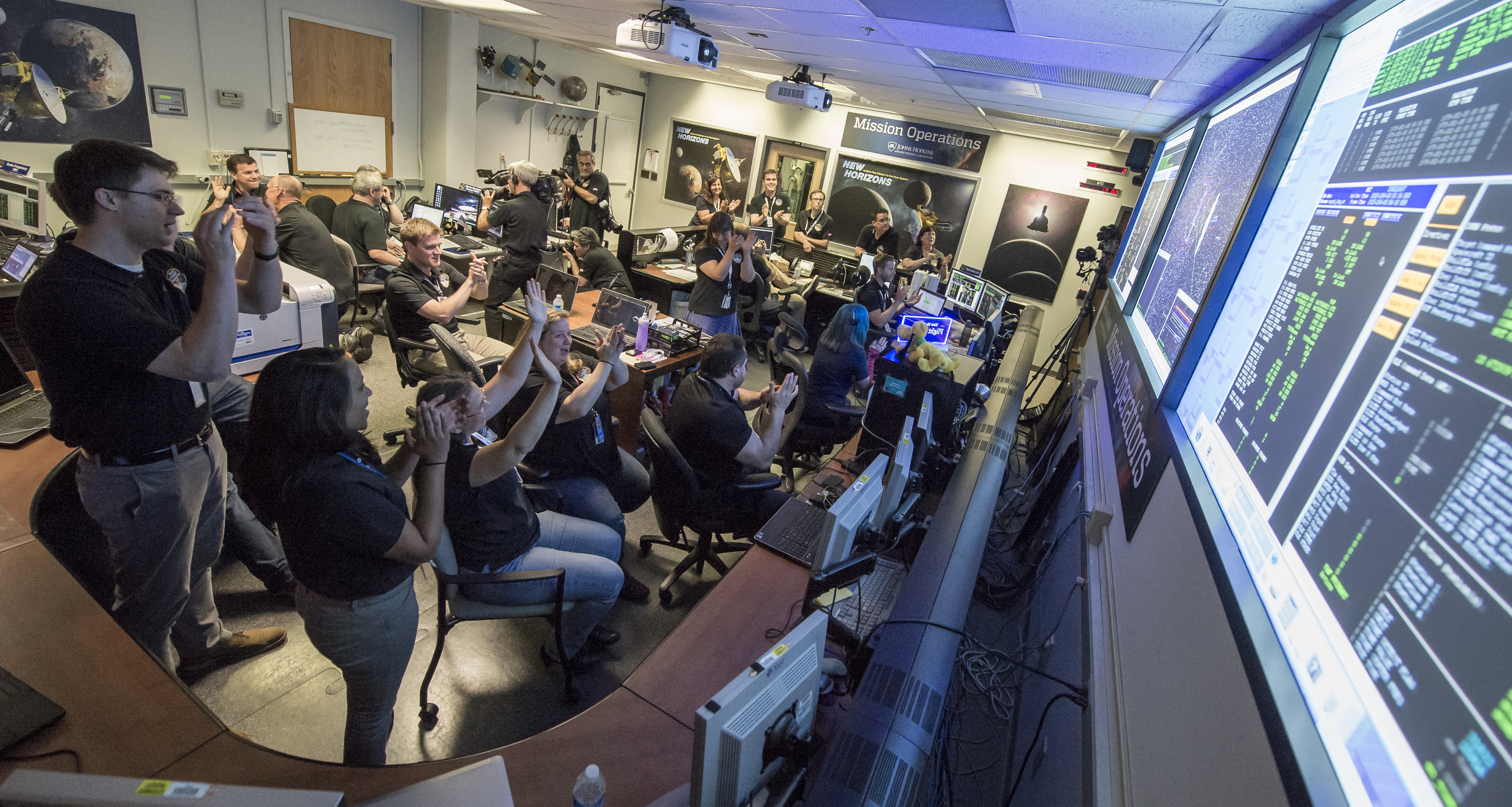
View of Mission Operations at the Applied Physics Laboratory in Laurel, Maryland (July 14, 2015)

The goal of the mission is to understand the formation of the Plutonian system, the Kuiper belt, and the transformation of the early Solar System. The spacecraft collected data on the atmospheres, surfaces, interiors, and environments of Pluto and its moons. It will also study other objects in the Kuiper belt. "By way of comparison, New Horizons gathered 5,000 times as much data at Pluto as Mariner did at the Red Planet."

Some of the questions the mission attempts to answer are: What is Pluto's atmosphere made of and how does it behave? What does its surface look like? Are there large geological structures? How do solar wind particles interact with Pluto's atmosphere?

Specifically, the mission's science objectives are to:

- Map the surface compositions of Pluto and Charon
- Characterize the geologies and morphologies of Pluto and Charon
- Characterize the neutral atmosphere of Pluto and its escape rate
- Search for an atmosphere around Charon
- Map surface temperatures on Pluto and Charon
- Search for rings and additional satellites around Pluto
- Conduct similar investigations of one or more Kuiper belt objects

== Design and construction ==
An interactive 3D model of New Horizons

=== Spacecraft subsystems ===
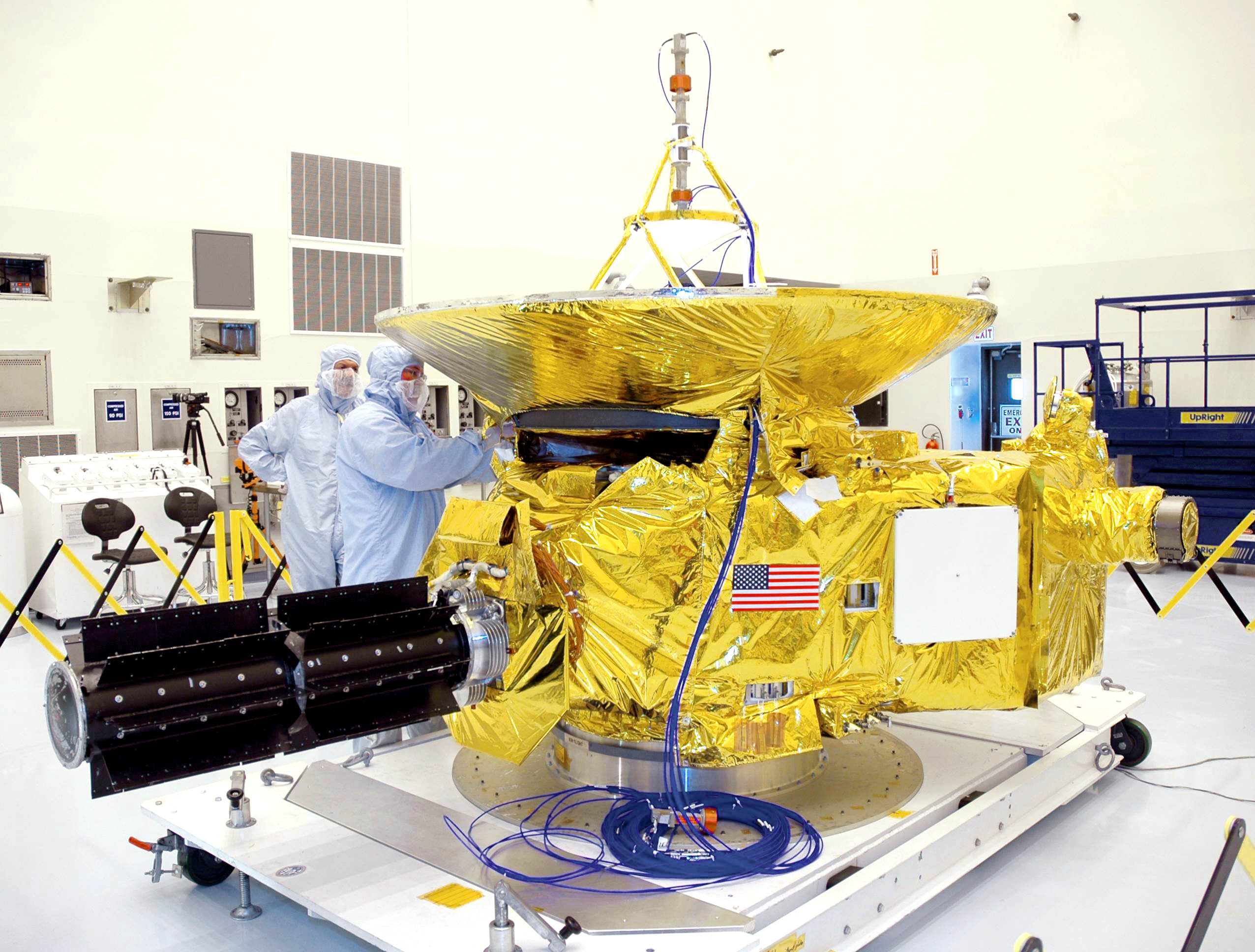
New Horizons in a clean room at Kennedy Space Center in 2005

The spacecraft is comparable in size and general shape to a grand piano and has been compared to a piano glued to a cocktail bar-sized satellite dish. As a point of departure, the team took inspiration from the Ulysses spacecraft, which also carried a radioisotope thermoelectric generator (RTG) and dish on a box-in-box structure through the outer Solar System. Many subsystems and components have flight heritage from APL's CONTOUR spacecraft, which in turn had heritage from APL's TIMED spacecraft.

New Horizons' body forms a triangle, almost 0.76 m (2.5 ft) thick. (The Pioneers have hexagonal bodies, whereas the Voyagers have decagonal bodies, Galileo an octagonal prism body, and Cassini–Huygens a dodecagonal prism body.) A 7075 aluminium alloy tube forms the main structural column, between the launch vehicle adapter ring at the "rear", and the 2.1 m (6 ft 11 in) radio dish antenna affixed to the "front" flat side. The titanium fuel tank is in this tube. The RTG attaches with a 4-sided titanium mount resembling a gray pyramid or stepstool.

Titanium provides strength and thermal isolation. The rest of the triangle is primarily sandwich panels of thin aluminum face sheet (less than 0.40 mm (1/64 in) bonded to aluminum honeycomb core. The structure is larger than strictly necessary, with empty space inside. The structure is designed to act as shielding, reducing electronics errors caused by radiation from the RTG. Also, the mass distribution required for a spinning spacecraft demands a wider triangle.

The interior structure is painted black to equalize temperature by radiative heat transfer. Overall, the spacecraft is thoroughly blanketed to retain heat. Unlike the Pioneers and Voyagers, the radio dish is also enclosed in blankets that extend to the body. The heat from the RTG adds warmth to the spacecraft while it is in the outer Solar System. While in the inner Solar System, the spacecraft must prevent overheating, hence electronic activity is limited, power is diverted to shunts with attached radiators, and louvers are opened to radiate excess heat. While the spacecraft is cruising inactively in the cold outer Solar System, the louvers are closed, and the shunt regulator reroutes power to electric heaters.

==== Propulsion and attitude control ====
New Horizons has both spin-stabilized (cruise) and three-axis stabilized (science) modes controlled entirely with hydrazine monopropellant. Additional post launch delta-v of over 290 m/s (1,000 km/h; 650 mph) is provided by a 77 kg (170 lb) internal tank. Helium is used as a pressurant, with an elastomeric diaphragm assisting expulsion. The spacecraft's on-orbit mass including fuel is over 470 kg (1,040 lb) on the Jupiter flyby trajectory, but would have been only 445 kg (981 lb) for the backup direct flight option to Pluto. Significantly, had the backup option been taken, this would have meant less fuel for later Kuiper belt operations.

There are 16 thrusters on New Horizons: four 4.4 N (1.0 lbf) and twelve 0.9 N (0.2 lbf) plumbed into redundant branches. The larger thrusters are used primarily for trajectory corrections, and the small ones (previously used on Cassini and the Voyager spacecraft) are used primarily for attitude control and spinup/spindown maneuvers. Two star cameras are used to measure the spacecraft attitude. They are mounted on the face of the spacecraft and provide attitude information while in spin-stabilized or 3-axis mode. In between the time of star camera readings, spacecraft orientation is provided by dual redundant miniature inertial measurement units. Each unit contains three solid-state gyroscopes and three accelerometers. Two Adcole Sun sensors provide attitude determination. One detects the angle to the Sun, whereas the other measures spin rate and clocking.

==== Power ====
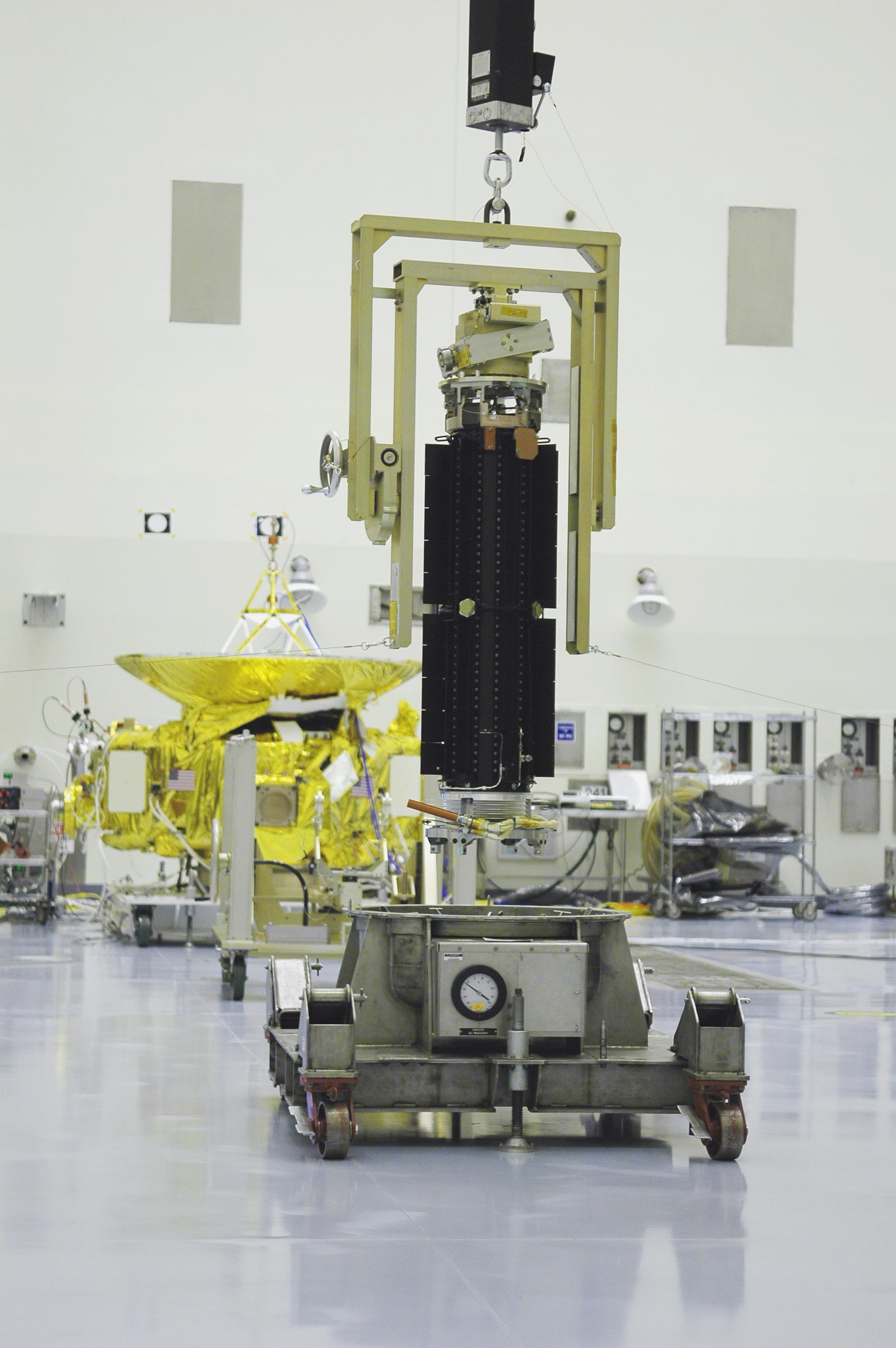
New Horizons' RTG

A cylindrical radioisotope thermoelectric generator (RTG) protrudes in the plane of the triangle from one vertex of the triangle. The RTG provided 245.7 watts of power at launch, and was predicted to drop approximately 3.5 watts every year, decaying to 202 watts by the time of its encounter with the Plutonian system in 2015 and will decay too far to power the transmitters in the 2030s. There are no onboard batteries since RTG output is predictable, and load transients are handled by a capacitor bank and fast circuit breakers. As of January 2019, the power output of the RTG is about 190 watts.

The RTG, model "GPHS-RTG", was originally a spare from the Cassini mission. The RTG contains 9.75 kg (21.5 lb) of plutonium-238 oxide pellets. Each pellet is clad in iridium, then encased in a graphite shell. Developed by the U.S. Department of Energy at the Materials and Fuels Complex, part of the Idaho National Laboratory. The original RTG design called for 10.9 kg (24 lb) of plutonium, but a unit less powerful than the original design goal was produced because of delays at the United States Department of Energy, including security activities, that delayed plutonium production. The mission parameters and observation sequence had to be modified for the reduced wattage; still, not all instruments can operate simultaneously. The Department of Energy transferred the space battery program from Ohio to Argonne in 2002 because of security concerns.

The amount of radioactive plutonium in the RTG is about one-third the amount on board the Cassini–Huygens probe when it launched in 1997. The Cassini launch had been protested by multiple organizations, due to the risk of such a large amount of plutonium being released into the atmosphere in case of an accident. The United States Department of Energy estimated the chances of a launch accident that would release radiation into the atmosphere at 1 in 350, and monitored the launch because of the inclusion of an RTG on board. It was estimated that a worst-case scenario of total dispersal of on-board plutonium would spread the equivalent radiation of 80% the average annual dosage in North America from background radiation over an area with a radius of 105 km (65 mi).

==== Flight computer ====
The spacecraft carries two computer systems: the Command and Data Handling system and the Guidance and Control processor. Each of the two systems is duplicated for redundancy, for a total of four computers. The processor used for its flight computers is the Mongoose-V, a 12 MHz radiation-hardened version of the MIPS R3000 CPU. Multiple redundant clocks and timing routines are implemented in hardware and software to help prevent faults and downtime. To conserve heat and mass, spacecraft and instrument electronics are housed together in IEMs (integrated electronics modules). There are two redundant IEMs. Including other functions such as instrument and radio electronics, each IEM contains 9 boards. The software of the probe runs on Nucleus RTOS operating system.

There have been two "safing" events, that sent the spacecraft into safe mode:

- On March 19, 2007, the Command and Data Handling computer experienced an uncorrectable memory error and rebooted itself, causing the spacecraft to go into safe mode. The craft fully recovered within two days, with some data loss on Jupiter's magnetotail. No impact on the subsequent mission was expected.
- On July 4, 2015, there was a CPU safing event triggered by an over-assignment of commanded science operations on the craft's approach to Pluto. Fortunately, the craft was able to recover within two days without major impacts on its mission. NASA scientists therefore reduced the number of scientific operations on the craft to prevent future events, which could happen during the approach with Pluto.

==== Telecommunications and data handling ====
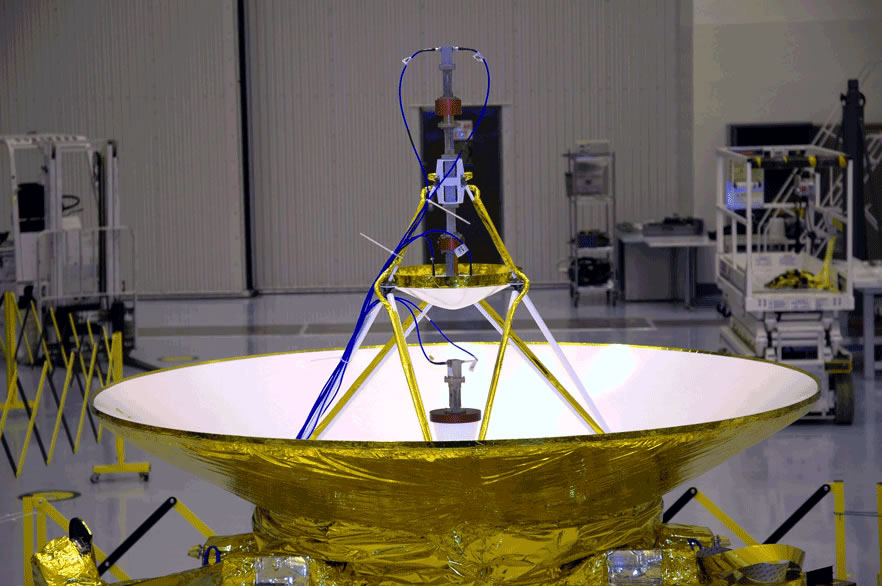
New Horizons' antenna, with some test equipment attached.

Communication with the spacecraft is via X band. The craft had a communication rate of 38 kbit/s at Jupiter; at Pluto's distance, a rate of approximately 1 kbit/s per transmitter was expected. Besides the low data rate, there is also a latency of about 4.5 hours one-way at Pluto's distance. The 70 m (230 ft) NASA Deep Space Network (DSN) dishes are used to relay commands once the spacecraft is beyond Jupiter. The spacecraft uses dual modular redundancy transmitters and receivers, and either right- or left-hand circular polarization.

The downlink signal is amplified by dual redundant 12-watt traveling-wave tube amplifiers (TWTAs) mounted on the body under the dish. The receivers are low-power designs. The system can be controlled to power both TWTAs at the same time, and transmit a dual-polarized downlink signal to the DSN that nearly doubles the downlink rate. DSN tests early in the mission with this dual polarization combining technique were successful, and the capability was declared to be operational (when the spacecraft power budget permits both TWTAs to be powered).

In addition to the high-gain antenna, there are two backup low-gain antennas and a medium-gain dish. The high-gain dish has a Cassegrain reflector layout, composite construction, of 2.1-meter (7 ft) diameter providing over 42 dBi of gain and a half-power beam width of about a degree. The prime-focus medium-gain antenna, with a 0.3-meter (1 ft) aperture and 10° half-power beam width, is mounted to the forward-facing side of the high-gain antenna's secondary reflector. The forward low-gain antenna is stacked atop the feed of the medium-gain antenna. The aft low-gain antenna is mounted within the launch adapter at the rear of the spacecraft. This antenna was used only for early mission phases near Earth, just after launch and for emergencies if the spacecraft had lost altitude control.

New Horizons recorded scientific instrument data to its solid-state memory buffer at each encounter, then transmitted the data to Earth. Data storage is done on two low-power solid-state recorders (one primary, one backup) holding up to 8 gigabytes each. Because of the extreme distance from Pluto and the Kuiper belt, only one buffer load at those encounters can be saved. This is because New Horizons would require approximately 16 months after leaving the vicinity of Pluto to transmit the buffer load back to Earth. At Pluto's distance, radio signals from the space probe back to Earth took 4 hours and 25 minutes to traverse 4.7 billion km (2.9 billion mi) of space.

Part of the reason for the delay between the gathering of and transmission of data is that all of the New Horizons instrumentation is body-mounted. In order for the cameras to record data, the entire probe must turn, and the one-degree-wide beam of the high-gain antenna was not pointing toward Earth. Previous spacecraft, such as the Voyager program probes, had a rotatable instrumentation platform (a "scan platform") that could take measurements from virtually any angle without losing radio contact with Earth. New Horizons was mechanically simplified to save weight, shorten the schedule, and improve reliability during its 15-year designed lifetime.

== Instruments ==
New Horizons carries seven instruments: three optical instruments, two plasma instruments, a dust sensor and a radio science receiver/radiometer. The instruments are to be used to investigate the global geology, surface composition, surface temperature, atmospheric pressure, atmospheric temperature and escape rate of Pluto and its moons. The rated power is 21 watts, though not all instruments operate simultaneously. In addition, New Horizons has an Ultrastable Oscillator subsystem, which may be used to study and test the Pioneer anomaly towards the end of the spacecraft's life.

=== Long-Range Reconnaissance Imager (LORRI) ===
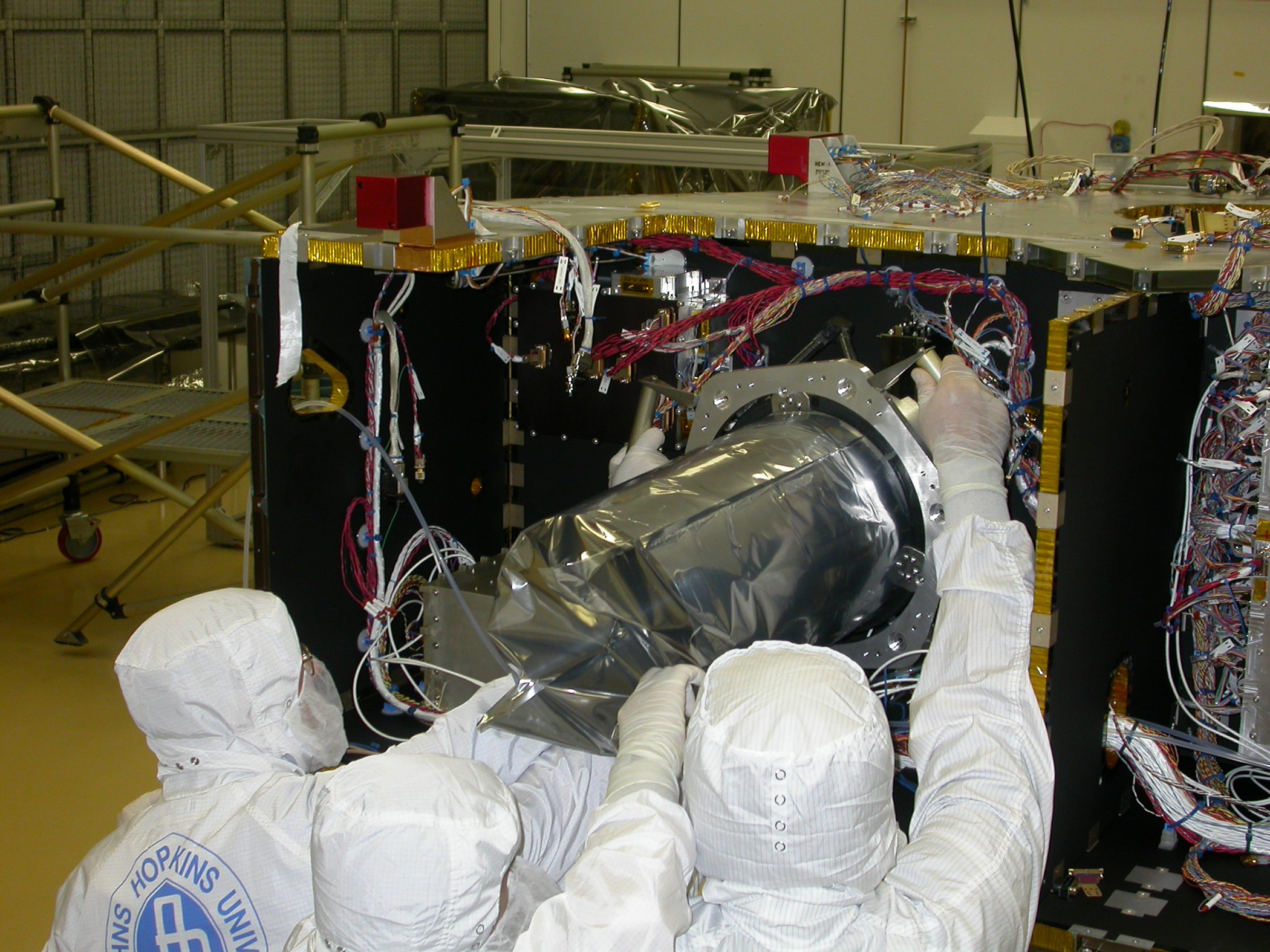
LORRI—long-range camera

The Long-Range Reconnaissance Imager (LORRI) is a long-focal-length imager designed for high resolution and responsivity at visible wavelengths. The instrument is equipped with a 1024×1024 pixel by 12-bits-per-pixel monochromatic CCD imager giving a resolution of 5 μrad (~1 arcsec). The CCD is chilled far below freezing by a passive radiator on the antisolar face of the spacecraft. This temperature differential requires insulation and isolation from the rest of the structure. The 208.3 mm (8.20 in) aperture Ritchey–Chretien mirrors and metering structure are made of silicon carbide to boost stiffness, reduce weight and prevent warping at low temperatures. The optical elements sit in a composite light shield and mount with titanium and fiberglass for thermal isolation. Overall mass is 8.6 kg (19 lb), with the optical tube assembly (OTA) weighing about 5.6 kg (12 lb), for one of the largest silicon-carbide telescopes flown at the time (now surpassed by Herschel). For viewing on public web sites the 12-bit per pixel LORRI images are converted to 8-bit per pixel JPEG images. These public images do not contain the full dynamic range of brightness information available from the raw LORRI images files.

Principal investigator: Andy Cheng, Applied Physics Laboratory, Data: LORRI image search at jhuapl.edu

=== Solar Wind Around Pluto (SWAP) ===
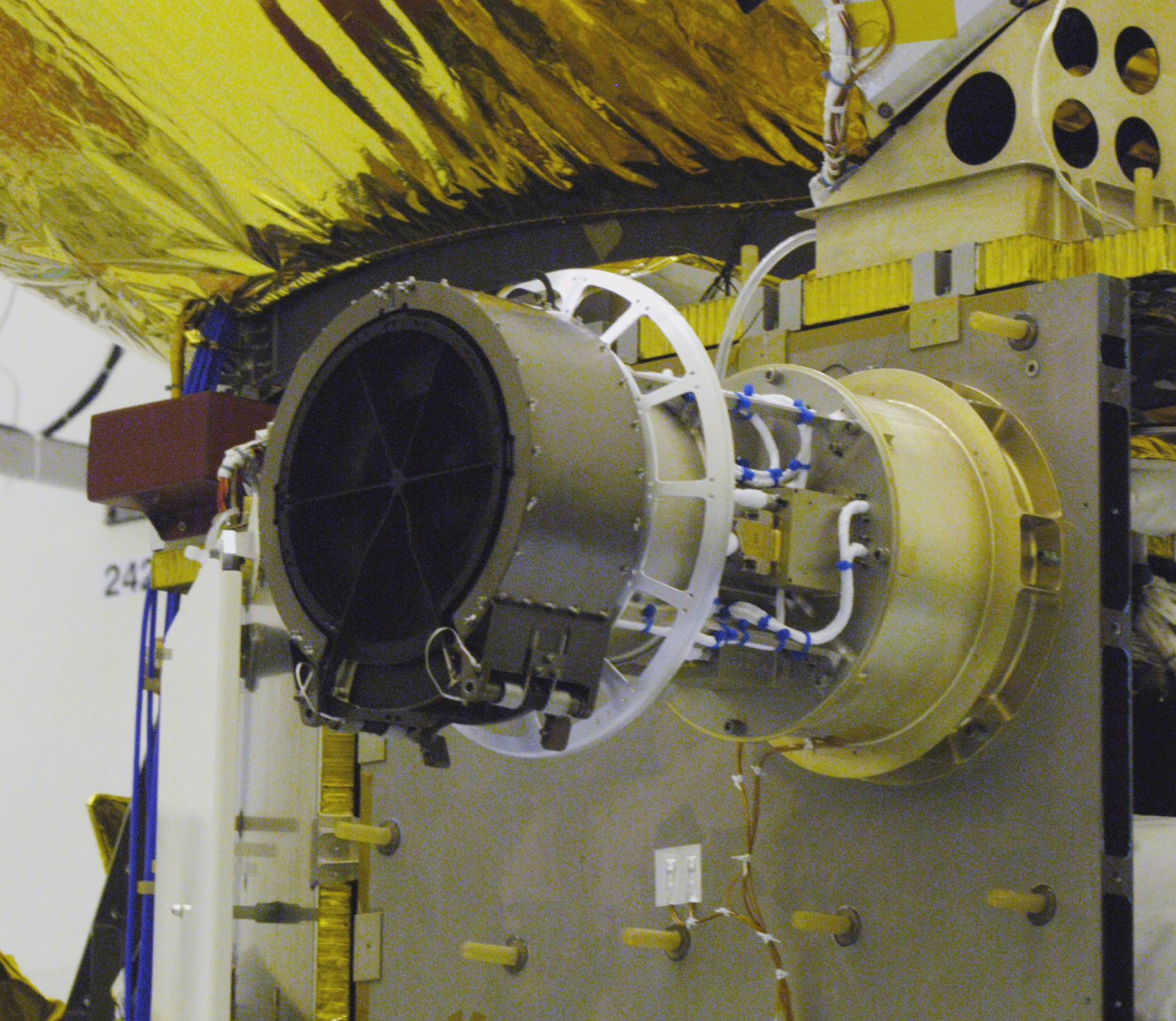
SWAP – Solar Wind Around Pluto

Solar Wind Around Pluto (SWAP) is a toroidal electrostatic analyzer and retarding potential analyzer (RPA), that makes up one of the two instruments comprising New Horizons' Plasma and high-energy particle spectrometer suite (PAM), the other being PEPSSI. SWAP measures particles of up to 6.5 keV and, because of the tenuous solar wind at Pluto's distance, the instrument is designed with the largest aperture of any such instrument ever flown.

Principal investigator: David McComas, Southwest Research Institute

=== Pluto Energetic Particle Spectrometer Science Investigation (PEPSSI) ===
Pluto Energetic Particle Spectrometer Science Investigation (PEPSSI) is a time of flight ion and electron sensor that makes up one of the two instruments comprising New Horizons' plasma and high-energy particle spectrometer suite (PAM), the other being SWAP. Unlike SWAP, which measures particles of up to 6.5 keV, PEPSSI goes up to 1 MeV. The PEPSSI sensor has been designed to measure the mass, energy and distribution of charged particles around Pluto, and is also able to differentiate between protons, electrons, and other heavy ions.

Principal investigator: Ralph McNutt Jr., Applied Physics Laboratory

=== Alice ===
Alice is an ultraviolet imaging spectrometer that is one of two photographic instruments comprising New Horizons' Pluto Exploration Remote Sensing Investigation (PERSI); the other being the Ralph telescope. It resolves 1,024 wavelength bands in the far and extreme ultraviolet (from 50–180 nm), over 32 view fields. Its goal is to determine the composition of Pluto's atmosphere. This Alice instrument is derived from another Alice aboard ESA's Rosetta spacecraft. The instrument has a mass of 4.4 kg and draws 4.4 watts of power. Its primary role is to determine the relative concentrations of various elements and isotopes in Pluto's atmosphere.

Principal investigator: Alan Stern, Southwest Research Institute

In August 2018, NASA confirmed, based on results by Alice on the New Horizons spacecraft, a "hydrogen wall" at the outer edges of the Solar System that was first detected in 1992 by the two Voyager spacecraft.

=== Ralph telescope ===
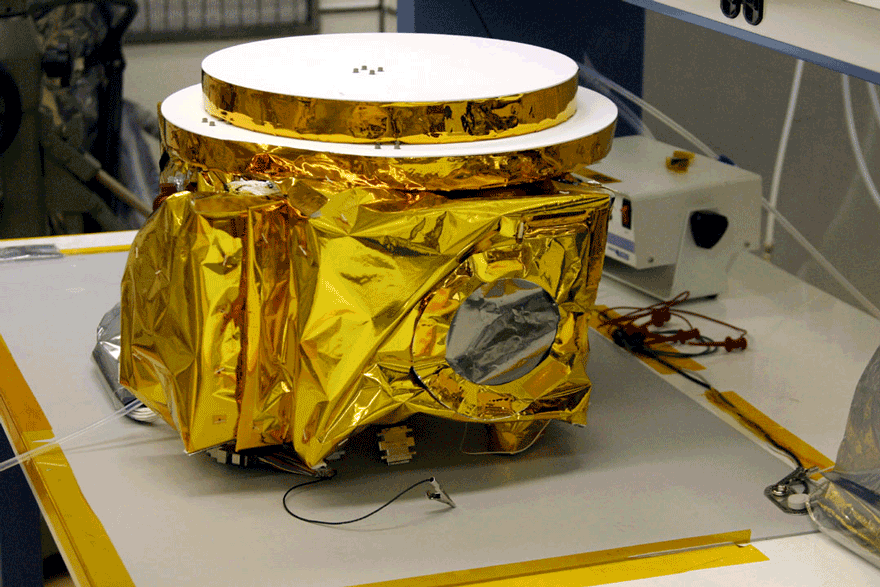
Ralph—telescope and color camera

The Ralph telescope, 75 mm in aperture, is one of two photographic instruments that make up New Horizons' Pluto Exploration Remote Sensing Investigation (PERSI), with the other being the Alice instrument. Ralph has two separate channels: MVIC (Multispectral Visible Imaging Camera), a visible-light CCD imager with broadband and color channels; and LEISA (Linear Etalon Imaging Spectral Array), a near-infrared imaging spectrometer. LEISA is derived from a similar instrument on the Earth Observing-1 spacecraft. Ralph was named after Alice's husband on The Honeymooners, and was designed after Alice.

On June 23, 2017, NASA announced that it has renamed the LEISA instrument to the "Lisa Hardaway Infrared Mapping Spectrometer" in honor of Lisa Hardaway, the Ralph program manager at Ball Aerospace, who died in January 2017 at age 50.

Principal investigator: Alan Stern, Southwest Research Institute

=== Venetia Burney Student Dust Counter (VBSDC) ===
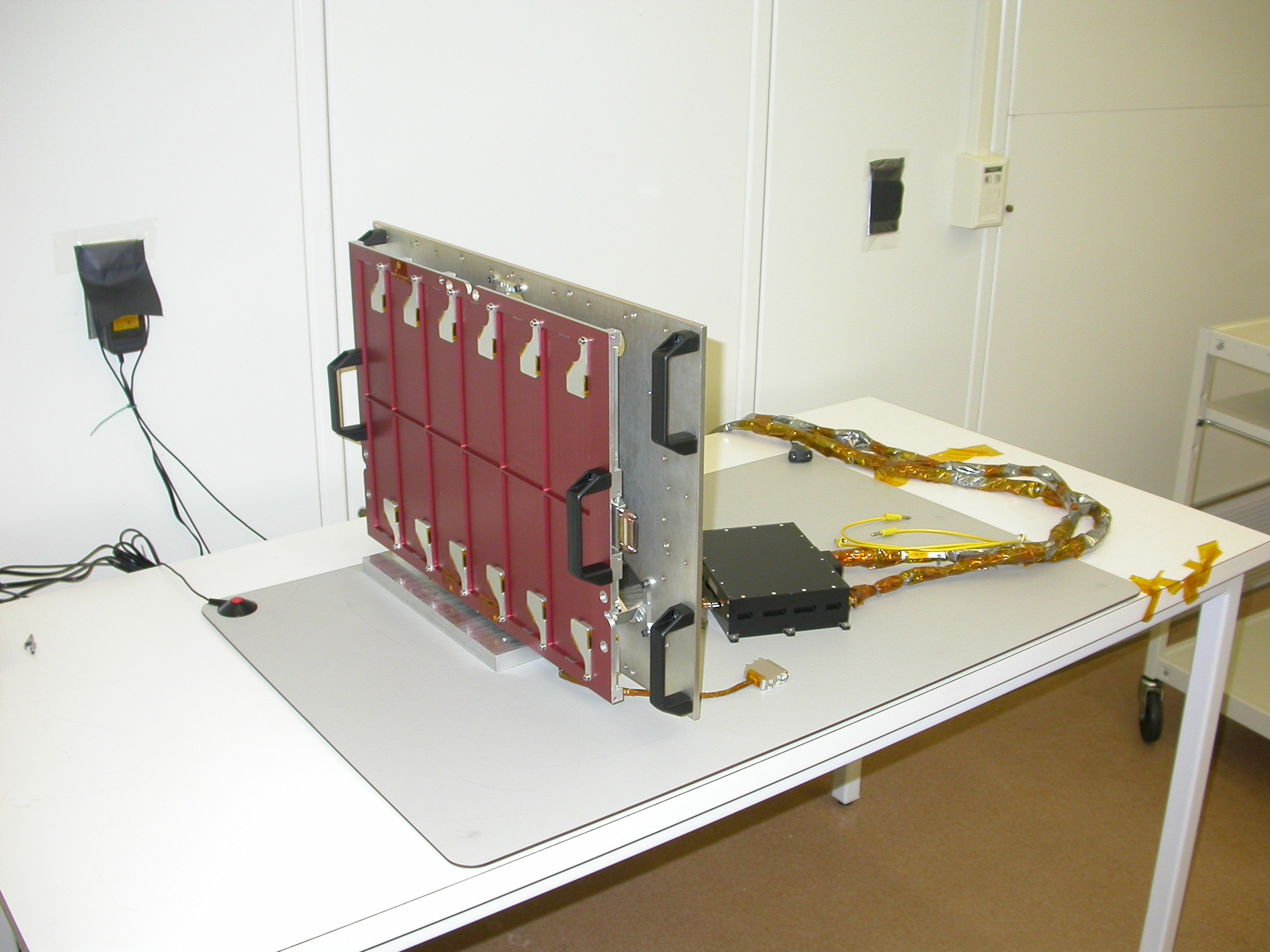
VBSDC—Venetia Burney Student Dust Counter

The Venetia Burney Student Dust Counter (VBSDC), built by students at the University of Colorado Boulder, is operating periodically to make dust measurements. It consists of a detector panel, about 460 mm × 300 mm (18 in × 12 in), mounted on the anti-solar face of the spacecraft (the ram direction), and an electronics box within the spacecraft. The detector contains fourteen polyvinylidene difluoride (PVDF) panels, twelve science and two reference, which generate voltage when impacted. Effective collecting area is 0.125 m^{2} (1.35 sq ft). No dust counter has operated past the orbit of Uranus; models of dust in the outer Solar System, especially the Kuiper belt, are speculative. The VBSDC is always turned on measuring the masses of the interplanetary and interstellar dust particles (in the range of nano- and picograms) as they collide with the PVDF panels mounted on the New Horizons spacecraft. The measured data is expected to greatly contribute to the understanding of the dust spectra of the Solar System. The dust spectra can then be compared with those from observations of other stars, giving new clues as to where Earth-like planets can be found in the universe. The dust counter is named for Venetia Burney, who first suggested the name "Pluto" at the age of 11. A thirteen-minute short film about the VBSDC garnered an Emmy Award for student achievement in 2006.

Principal investigator: Mihaly Horanyi, University of Colorado Boulder

=== Radio Science Experiment (REX) ===
The Radio Science Experiment (REX) used an ultrastable crystal oscillator (essentially a calibrated crystal in a miniature oven) and some additional electronics to conduct radio science investigations using the communications channels. These are small enough to fit on a single card. Because there are two redundant communications subsystems, there are two, identical REX circuit boards.

Principal investigators: Len Tyler and Ivan Linscott, Stanford University

== Journey to Pluto ==
=== Launch ===
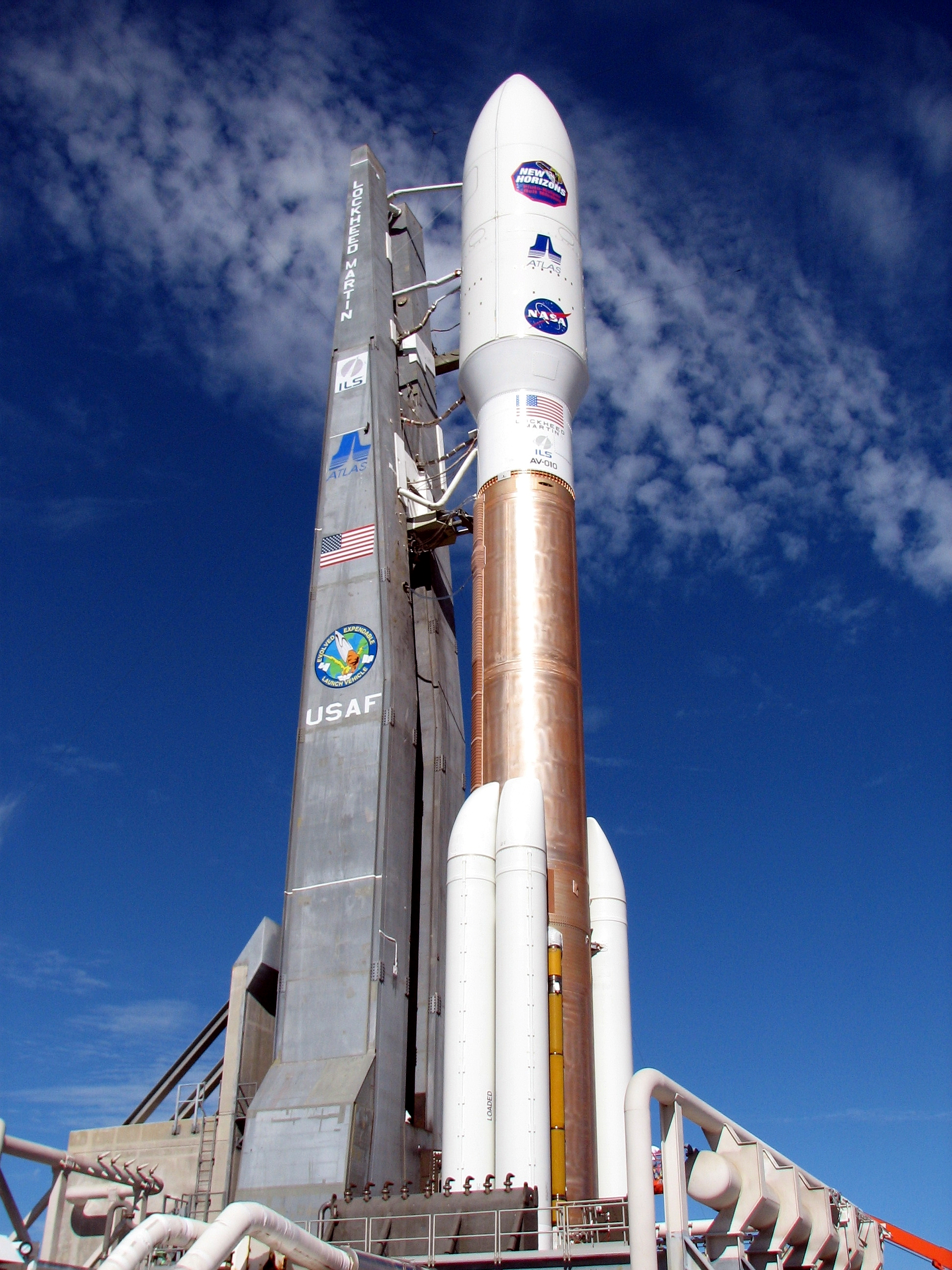
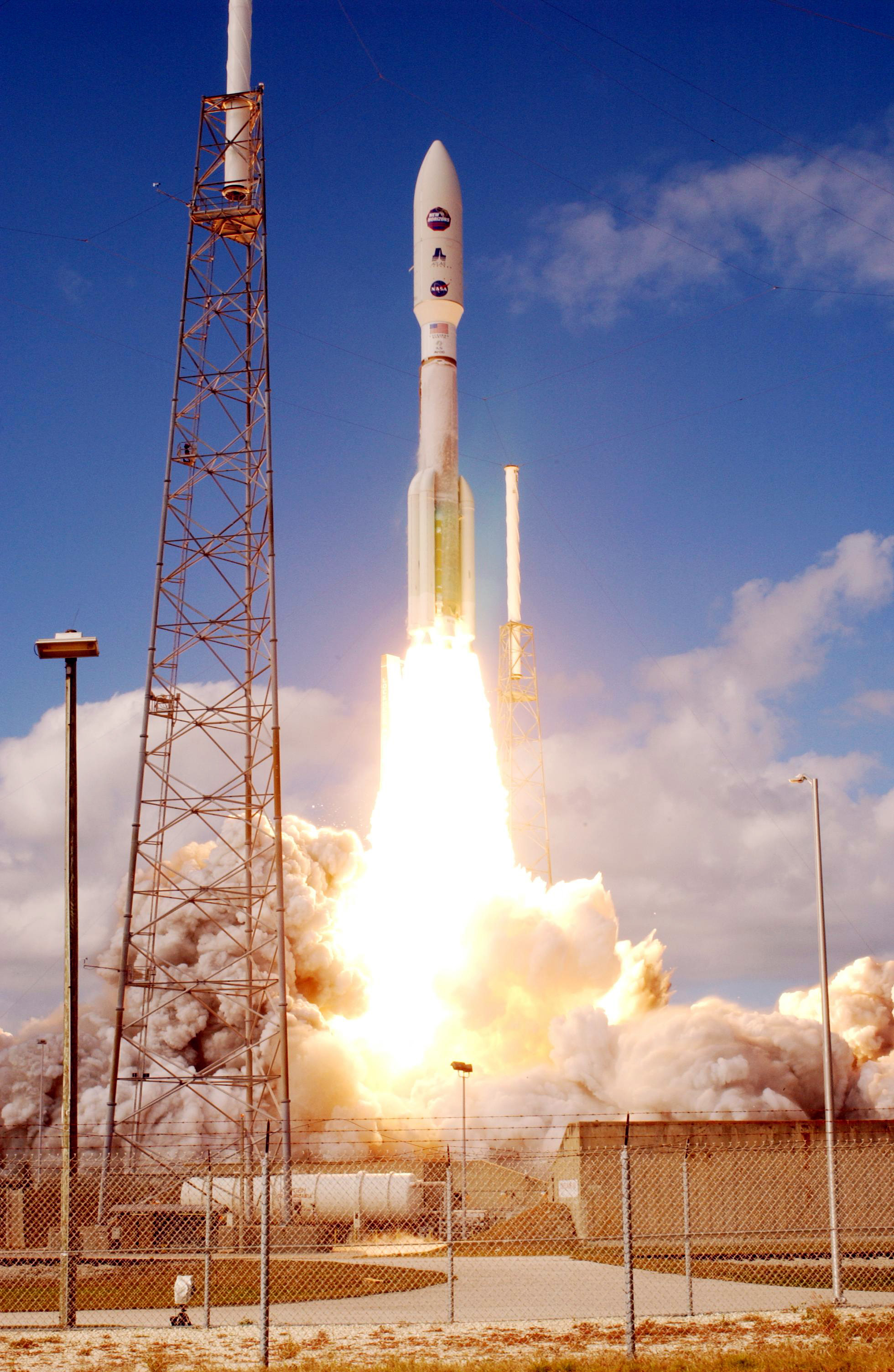
Launch of New Horizons. The Atlas V rocket on the launchpad (left) and lift off from Cape Canaveral.

On September 24, 2005, the spacecraft arrived at the Kennedy Space Center on board a C-17 Globemaster III for launch preparations. The launch of New Horizons was originally scheduled for January 11, 2006, but was initially delayed until January 17, 2006, to allow for borescope inspections of the Atlas V's kerosene tank. Further delays related to low cloud ceiling conditions downrange, and high winds and technical difficulties—unrelated to the rocket itself—prevented launch for a further two days.

The probe finally lifted off from Pad 41 at Cape Canaveral Air Force Station, Florida, directly south of Space Shuttle Launch Complex 39, at 19:00 UTC on January 19, 2006. The Centaur second stage ignited at 19:04:43 UTC and burned for 5 minutes 25 seconds. It reignited at 19:32 UTC and burned for 9 minutes 47 seconds. The ATK Star 48B third stage ignited at 19:42:37 UTC and burned for 1 minute 28 seconds. Combined, these burns successfully sent the probe on a solar-escape trajectory at 16.26 kilometers per second (58,536 km/h; 36,373 mph). New Horizons took only nine hours to pass the Moon's orbit. Although there were backup launch opportunities in February 2006 and February 2007, only the first twenty-three days of the 2006 window permitted the Jupiter flyby. Any launch outside that period would have forced the spacecraft to fly a slower trajectory directly to Pluto, delaying its encounter by five to six years.

The probe was launched by a Lockheed Martin Atlas V 551 rocket, with a third stage added to increase the heliocentric (escape) speed. This was the first launch of the Atlas V 551 configuration, which uses five solid rocket boosters, and the first Atlas V with a third stage. Previous flights had used zero, two, or three solid boosters, but never five. The vehicle, AV-010, weighed 573,160 kilograms (1,263,600 lb) at lift-off, and had earlier been slightly damaged when Hurricane Wilma swept across Florida on October 24, 2005. One of the solid rocket boosters was hit by a door. The booster was replaced with an identical unit, rather than inspecting and requalifying the original.

The launch was dedicated to the memory of launch conductor Daniel Sarokon, who was described by space program officials as one of the most influential people in the history of space travel.

=== Inner Solar System ===
==== Trajectory corrections ====
On January 28 and 30, 2006, mission controllers guided the probe through its first trajectory-correction maneuver (TCM), which was divided into two parts (TCM-1A and TCM-1B). The total velocity change of these two corrections was about 18 meters per second (65 km/h; 40 mph). TCM-1 was accurate enough to permit the cancellation of TCM-2, the second of three originally scheduled corrections. On March 9, 2006, controllers performed TCM-3, the last of three scheduled course corrections. The engines burned for 76 seconds, adjusting the spacecraft's velocity by about 1.16 m/s (4.2 km/h; 2.6 mph). Further trajectory maneuvers were not needed until September 25, 2007 (seven months after the Jupiter flyby), when the engines were fired for 15 minutes and 37 seconds, changing the spacecraft's velocity by 2.37 m/s (8.5 km/h; 5.3 mph), followed by another TCM, almost three years later on June 30, 2010, that lasted 35.6 seconds, when New Horizons had already reached the halfway point (in time traveled) to Pluto.

==== In-flight tests and crossing of Mars orbit ====
During the week of February 20, 2006, controllers conducted initial in-flight tests of three onboard science instruments, the Alice ultraviolet imaging spectrometer, the PEPSSI plasma-sensor, and the LORRI long-range visible-spectrum camera. No scientific measurements or images were taken, but instrument electronics, and in the case of Alice, some electromechanical systems were shown to be functioning correctly.

On April 7, 2006, the spacecraft passed the orbit of Mars, moving at roughly 21 km/s (76,000 km/h; 47,000 mph) away from the Sun at a solar distance of 243 million kilometers.

==== Asteroid 132524 APL ====
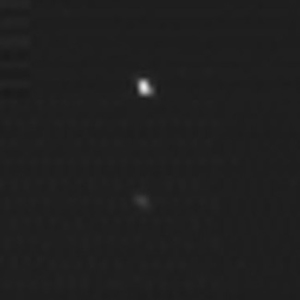
Asteroid 132524 APL viewed by New Horizons in June 2006

First images of Pluto in September 2006

Because of the need to conserve fuel for possible encounters with Kuiper belt objects subsequent to the Pluto flyby, intentional encounters with objects in the asteroid belt were not planned. After launch, the New Horizons team scanned the spacecraft's trajectory to determine if any asteroids would, by chance, be close enough for observation. In May 2006 it was discovered that New Horizons would pass close to the asteroid 132524 APL on June 13, 2006. Closest approach occurred at 4:05 UTC at a distance of 101,867 km (63,297 mi) (around one quarter of the average Earth-Moon distance). The asteroid was imaged by Ralph (use of LORRI was not possible because of proximity to the Sun), which gave the team a chance to test Ralph's capabilities, and make observations of the asteroid's composition as well as light and phase curves. The asteroid was estimated to be 2.5 km (1.6 mi) in diameter. The spacecraft successfully tracked the rapidly moving asteroid over June 10–12, 2006.

==== First Pluto sighting ====
The first images of Pluto from New Horizons were acquired September 21–24, 2006, during a test of LORRI. They were released on November 28, 2006. The images, taken from a distance of approximately 4.2 billion km (2.6 billion mi; 28 AU), confirmed the spacecraft's ability to track distant targets, critical for maneuvering toward Pluto and other Kuiper belt objects.

=== Jupiter encounter ===
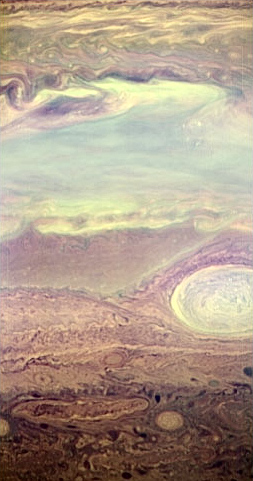
Infrared image of Jupiter by New Horizons

New Horizons used LORRI to take its first photographs of Jupiter on September 4, 2006, from a distance of 291 million kilometers (181 million miles). More detailed exploration of the system began in January 2007 with an infrared image of the moon Callisto, as well as several black-and-white images of Jupiter itself. New Horizons received a gravity assist from Jupiter, with its closest approach at 05:43:40 UTC on February 28, 2007, when it was 2.3 million kilometers (1.4 million miles) from Jupiter. The flyby increased New Horizons' speed by 4 km/s (14,000 km/h; 9,000 mph), accelerating the probe to a velocity of 23 km/s (83,000 km/h; 51,000 mph) relative to the Sun and shortening its voyage to Pluto by three years.

The flyby was the center of a four-month intensive observation campaign lasting from January to June. Being an ever-changing scientific target, Jupiter has been observed intermittently since the end of the Galileo mission in September 2003. Knowledge about Jupiter benefited from the fact that New Horizons' instruments were built using the latest technology, especially in the area of cameras, representing a significant improvement over Galileo's cameras, which were modified versions of Voyager cameras, which, in turn, were modified Mariner cameras. The Jupiter encounter also served as a shakedown and dress rehearsal for the Pluto encounter. Because Jupiter is much closer to Earth than Pluto, the communications link can transmit multiple loadings of the memory buffer; thus the mission returned more data from the Jovian system than it was expected to transmit from Pluto.

One of the main goals during the Jupiter encounter was observing its atmospheric conditions and analyzing the structure and composition of its clouds. Heat-induced lightning strikes in the polar regions and "waves" that indicate violent storm activity were observed and measured. The Little Red Spot, spanning up to 70% of Earth's diameter, was imaged from up close for the first time. Recording from different angles and illumination conditions, New Horizons took detailed images of Jupiter's faint ring system, discovering debris left over from recent collisions within the rings or from other unexplained phenomena. The search for undiscovered moons within the rings showed no results. Travelling through Jupiter's magnetosphere, New Horizons collected valuable particle readings. "Bubbles" of plasma that are thought to be formed from material ejected by the moon Io were noticed in the magnetotail.

==== Jovian moons ====
The four largest moons of Jupiter were in poor positions for observation; the necessary path of the gravity-assist maneuver meant that New Horizons passed millions of kilometers from any of the Galilean moons. Still, its instruments were intended for small, dim targets, so they were scientifically useful on large, distant moons. Emphasis was put on Jupiter's innermost Galilean moon, Io, whose active volcanoes shoot out tons of material into Jupiter's magnetosphere, and further. Out of eleven observed eruptions, three were seen for the first time. That of Tvashtar reached an altitude of up to 330 km (210 mi). The event gave scientists an unprecedented look into the structure and motion of the rising plume and its subsequent fall back to the surface. Infrared signatures of a further 36 volcanoes were noticed. Callisto's surface was analyzed with LEISA, revealing how lighting and viewing conditions affect infrared spectrum readings of its surface water ice. Minor moons such as Amalthea had their orbit solutions refined. The cameras determined their positions, acting as "reverse optical navigation".

Jovian moons imaged by New Horizons

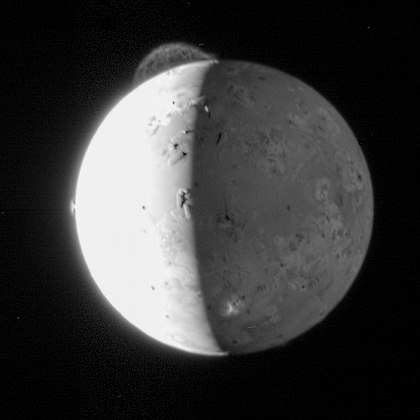
Io imaged on February 28, 2007. The feature near the north pole of the moon is a 290 km (180 mi) high plume from the volcano Tvashtar.

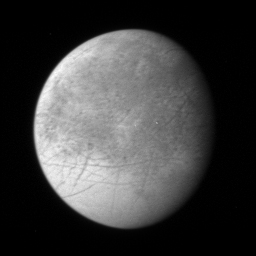
Europa imaged on February 27, 2007, from a distance of 3.1 million km (1.9 million mi). Image scale is 15 km per pixel (9.3 mi/px).

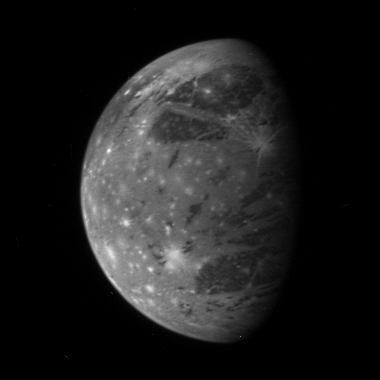
Ganymede imaged on February 27, 2007, from a distance of 3.5 million km (2.2 million mi). Image scale is 17 km per pixel (11 mi/px).

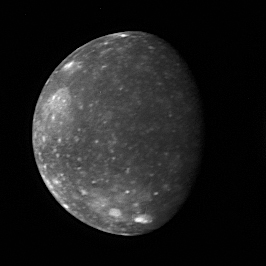
Callisto imaged on February 27, 2007, from a distance of 4.7 million km (2.9 million mi).

Media related to Photos of Jupiter system by New Horizons at Wikimedia Commons

=== Outer Solar System ===
Heliocentric positions of the five interstellar probes (squares) and other bodies (circles) until 2030, with launch and flyby dates. Markers denote positions on 1 January of each year, with every fifth year labelled. Plot 1 is viewed from the north ecliptic pole, to scale. Plots 2 to 4 are third-angle projections at 20% scale. In the SVG file, hover over a trajectory or orbit to highlight it and its associated launches and flybys.

After passing Jupiter, New Horizons spent most of its journey towards Pluto in hibernation mode. Redundant components as well as guidance and control systems were shut down to extend their life cycle, decrease operation costs and free the Deep Space Network for other missions. During hibernation mode, the onboard computer monitored the probe's systems and transmitted a signal back to Earth; a "green" code if everything was functioning as expected or a "red" code if mission control's assistance was needed. The probe was activated for about two months a year so that the instruments could be calibrated and the systems checked. The first hibernation mode cycle started on June 28, 2007, the second cycle began on December 16, 2008, the third cycle on August 27, 2009, and the fourth cycle on August 29, 2014, after a 10-week test.

New Horizons crossed the orbit of Saturn on June 8, 2008, and Uranus on March 18, 2011. After astronomers announced the discovery of two new moons in the Pluto system, Kerberos and Styx, mission planners started contemplating the possibility of the probe running into unseen debris and dust left over from ancient collisions between the moons. A study based on 18 months of computer simulations, Earth-based telescope observations and occultations of the Pluto system revealed that the possibility of a catastrophic collision with debris or dust was less than 0.3% on the probe's scheduled course. If the hazard increased, New Horizons could have used one of two possible contingency plans, the so-called SHBOTs (safe haven by other trajectories). Either the probe could have continued on its present trajectory with the antenna facing the incoming particles so the more vital systems would be protected, or it could have positioned its antenna to make a course correction that would take it just 3,000 km (1,900 mi) from the surface of Pluto where it was expected that the atmospheric drag would have cleaned the surrounding space of possible debris.

While in hibernation mode in July 2012, New Horizons started gathering scientific data with SWAP, PEPSSI and VBSDC. Although it was originally planned to activate just the VBSDC, other instruments were powered on in order to collect valuable heliospheric data. Before activating the other two instruments, ground tests were conducted to make sure that the expanded data gathering in this phase of the mission would not limit available energy, memory and fuel in the future and that all systems were functioning during the flyby. The first set of data was transmitted in January 2013 during a three-week activation from hibernation. The command and data handling software was updated to address the problem of computer resets.

==== Possible Neptune trojan targets ====
Other possible targets were Neptune trojans. The probe's trajectory to Pluto passed near Neptune's trailing Lagrange point ("L_{5}"), which may host hundreds of bodies in 1:1 resonance. In late 2013, New Horizons passed within 1.2 AU (180 million km; 110 million mi) of the high-inclination L5 Neptune trojan 2011 HM102, which was discovered shortly before by the New Horizons KBO Search task, a survey to find additional distant objects for New Horizons to fly by after its 2015 encounter with Pluto. At that range, 2011 HM_{102} would have been bright enough to be detectable by New Horizons' LORRI instrument; however, the New Horizons team eventually decided that they would not target 2011 HM_{102} for observations because the preparations for the Pluto approach took precedence. On August 25, 2014, New Horizons crossed the orbit of Neptune, exactly 25 years after the planet was visited by the Voyager 2 probe. This was the last major planet orbit crossing before the Pluto flyby. At the time, the spacecraft was 3.99 billion km (2.48 billion mi; 26.7 AU) away from Neptune and 4.51 billion km (2.80 billion mi; 30.1 AU) from the Sun.

==== Observations of Pluto and Charon 2013–14 ====
Images from July 1 to 3, 2013, by LORRI were the first by the probe to resolve Pluto and Charon as separate objects. On July 14, 2014, mission controllers performed a sixth trajectory-correction maneuver (TCM) since its launch to enable the craft to reach Pluto. Between July 19–24, 2014, New Horizons' LORRI snapped 12 images of Charon revolving around Pluto, covering almost one full rotation at distances ranging from about 429 to 422 million km (267 to 262 million mi). In August 2014, astronomers made high-precision measurements of Pluto's location and orbit around the Sun using the Atacama Large Millimeter/submillimeter Array (ALMA), an array of radio telescopes located in Chile, to help NASA's New Horizons spacecraft accurately home in on Pluto. On December 6, 2014, mission controllers sent a signal for the craft to "wake up" from its final Pluto-approach hibernation and begin regular operations. The craft's response that it was "awake" reached Earth on December 7, 2014, at 02:30 UTC.

=== Pluto approach ===
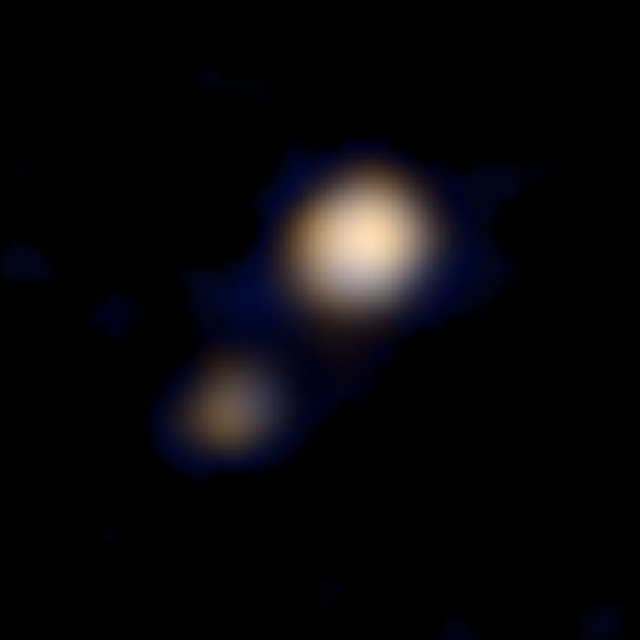
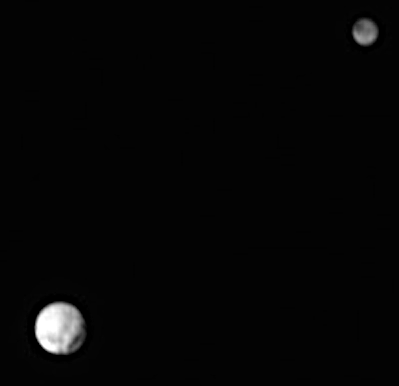
Pluto and Charon photographed on April 9, 2015, (left) by Ralph and on June 29, 2015, (right) by LORRI.

Distant-encounter operations at Pluto began on January 4, 2015. On this date, images of the targets with the onboard LORRI imager plus the Ralph telescope were only a few pixels in width. Investigators began taking Pluto images and background starfield images to assist mission navigators in the design of course-correcting engine maneuvers that would precisely modify the trajectory of New Horizons to aim the approach.

On February 12, 2015, NASA released new images of Pluto (taken from January 25 to 31) from the approaching probe. New Horizons was more than 203 million km (126 million mi) away from Pluto when it began taking the photos, which showed Pluto and its largest moon, Charon. The exposure time was too short to see Pluto's smaller, much fainter moons.

Investigators compiled a series of images of the moons Nix and Hydra taken from January 27 through February 8, 2015, beginning at a range of 201 million km (125 million mi). Pluto and Charon appear as a single overexposed object at the center. The right side image has been processed to remove the background starfield. The other two, even smaller moons—Kerberos and Styx—were seen on photos taken on April 25. Starting on May 11, a hazard search was performed, looking for unknown objects that could be a danger to the spacecraft, such as rings or hitherto undiscovered moons, which could then possibly be avoided by a course change. No rings or additional moons were found.

Also in regard to the approach phase during January 2015, on August 21, 2012, the team announced that they would spend mission time attempting long-range observations of the Kuiper belt object temporarily designated VNH0004 (now designated 2011 KW48), when the object was at a distance of 75 million km (0.50 AU; 47 million mi) from New Horizons. The object would be too distant to resolve surface features or take spectroscopy, but it would be able to make observations that cannot be made from Earth, namely a phase curve and a search for small moons. A second object was planned to be observed in June 2015, and a third in September after the flyby; the team hoped to observe a dozen such objects through 2018. On April 15, 2015, Pluto was imaged showing a possible polar cap.

==== Software glitch ====
On July 4, 2015, New Horizons experienced a software anomaly and went into safe mode, preventing the spacecraft from performing scientific observations until engineers could resolve the problem. On July 5, NASA announced that the problem was determined to be a timing flaw in a command sequence used to prepare the spacecraft for its flyby, and the spacecraft would resume scheduled science operations on July 7. The science observations lost because of the anomaly were judged to have no impact on the mission's main objectives and minimal impact on other objectives.

The timing flaw consisted of performing two tasks simultaneously—compressing previously acquired data to release space for more data, and making a second copy of the approach command sequence—that together overloaded the spacecraft's primary computer. After the overload was detected, the spacecraft performed as designed: it switched from the primary computer to the backup computer, entered safe mode, and sent a distress call back to Earth. The distress call was received the afternoon of July 4 and alerted engineers that they needed to contact the spacecraft to get more information and resolve the issue. The resolution was that the problem happened as part of preparations for the approach, and was not expected to happen again because no similar tasks were planned for the remainder of the encounter.

== Pluto system encounter ==
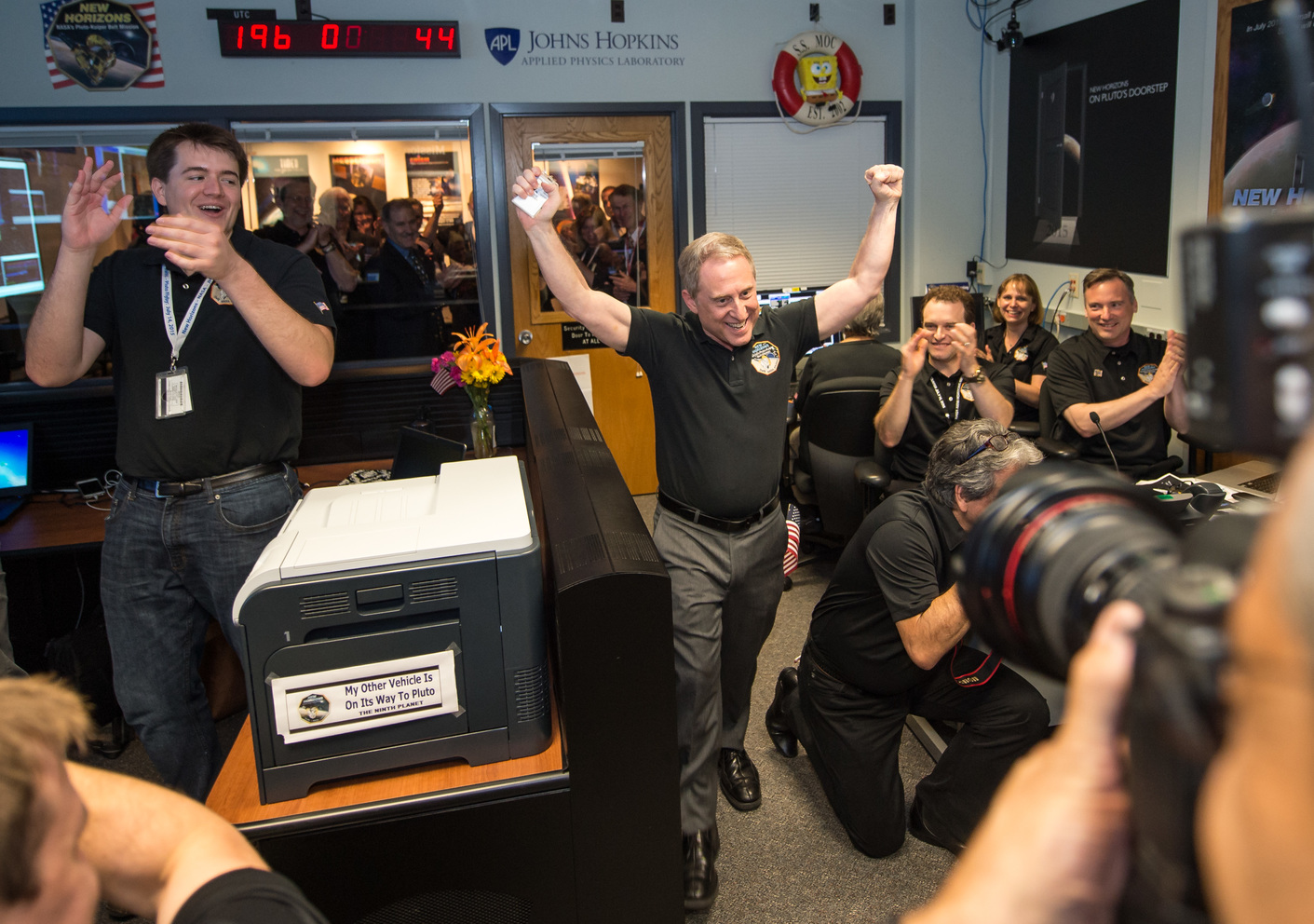
Alan Stern and the New Horizons team celebrate after the spacecraft successfully completed its flyby of Pluto.

The closest approach of the New Horizons spacecraft to Pluto occurred at 11:49 UTC on July 14, 2015, at a range of 12,472 km (7,750 mi) from the surface and 13,658 km (8,487 mi) from the center of Pluto. Telemetry data confirming a successful flyby and a healthy spacecraft was received on Earth from the vicinity of the Pluto system on July 15, 2015, 00:52:37 UTC, after 22 hours of planned radio silence due to the spacecraft being pointed towards the Pluto system. Mission managers estimated a one in 10,000 chance that debris could have destroyed the probe or its communication-systems during the flyby, preventing it from sending data to Earth. The first details of the encounter were received the next day, but the download of the complete data set through the 2 kbps data downlink took just over 15 months.

=== Objectives ===
The mission's science objectives were grouped in three distinct priorities. The "primary objectives" were required. The "secondary objectives" were expected to be met but were not demanded. The "tertiary objectives" were desired. These objectives could have been skipped in favor of the above objectives. An objective to measure any magnetic field of Pluto was dropped, due to mass and the expense associated with including a magnetometer on the spacecraft. Instead, SWAP and PEPSSI could indirectly detect magnetic fields around Pluto.

- Primary objectives (required)
  - Characterize the global geology and morphology of Pluto and Charon
  - Map chemical compositions of Pluto and Charon surfaces
  - Characterize the neutral (non-ionized) atmosphere of Pluto and its escape rate
- Secondary objectives (expected)
  - Characterize the time variability of Pluto's surface and atmosphere
  - Image select Pluto and Charon areas in stereo
  - Map the terminators (day/night border) of Pluto and Charon with high resolution
  - Map the chemical compositions of select Pluto and Charon areas with high resolution
  - Characterize Pluto's ionosphere (upper layer of the atmosphere) and its interaction with the solar wind
  - Search for molecular neutral species such as molecular hydrogen, hydrocarbons, hydrogen cyanide and other nitriles in the atmosphere
  - Search for any Charon atmosphere
  - Determine bolometric Bond albedos for Pluto and Charon
  - Map surface temperatures of Pluto and Charon
  - Map any additional surfaces of outermost moons: Nix, Hydra, Kerberos, and Styx
- Tertiary objectives (desired)
  - Characterize the energetic particle environment at Pluto and Charon
  - Refine bulk parameters (radii, masses) and orbits of Pluto and Charon
  - Search for additional moons and any rings

"The New Horizons flyby of the Pluto system was fully successful, meeting and in many cases exceeding, the Pluto objectives set out for it by NASA and the National Academy of Sciences."

=== Flyby details ===
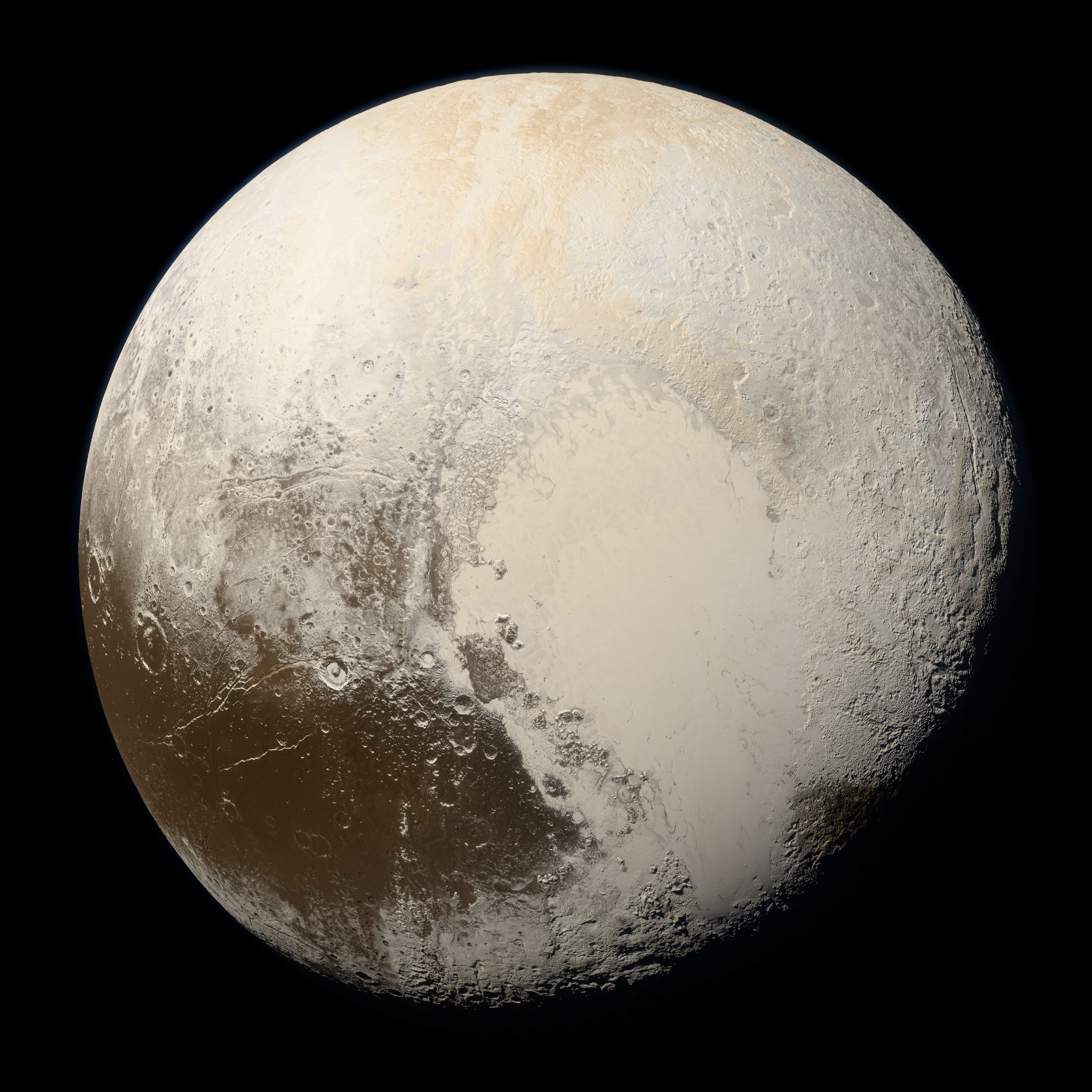
Pluto's "encounter hemisphere" viewed by New Horizons on July 14, 2015

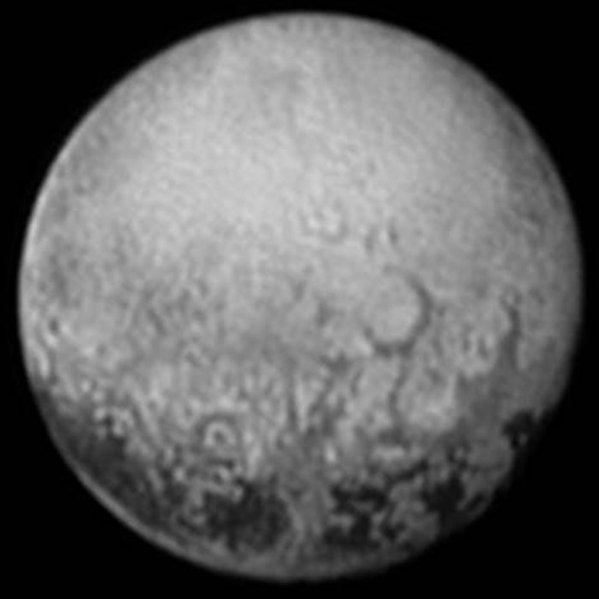
Pluto's Charon-facing opposing hemisphere viewed on July 11, 2015

Animation of New Horizons' flyby of Pluto in Eyes on the Solar System.

On July 14, 2015, at 11:50 UTC, New Horizons made its closest approach to Pluto, passing within 12,500 km (7,800 mi) at a speed of 13.78 km/s (49,600 km/h; 30,800 mph), while also coming as close as 28,800 km (17,900 mi) to Charon. Starting 3.2 days prior, the spacecraft mapped Pluto and Charon with 40 km (25 mi) resolution, enabling coverage of all sides. Close-range imaging was conducted twice daily to monitor for surface changes, such as snowfall or cryovolcanism. During the flyby, LORRI captured images with up to 50 m (160 ft) resolution, MVIC created four-color global maps at 1.6 km (1 mi) resolution, and LEISA obtained near-infrared hyperspectral maps at resolutions ranging from 7 km/px (4.3 mi/px) globally to 0.6 km/px (0.37 mi/px) for selected areas.

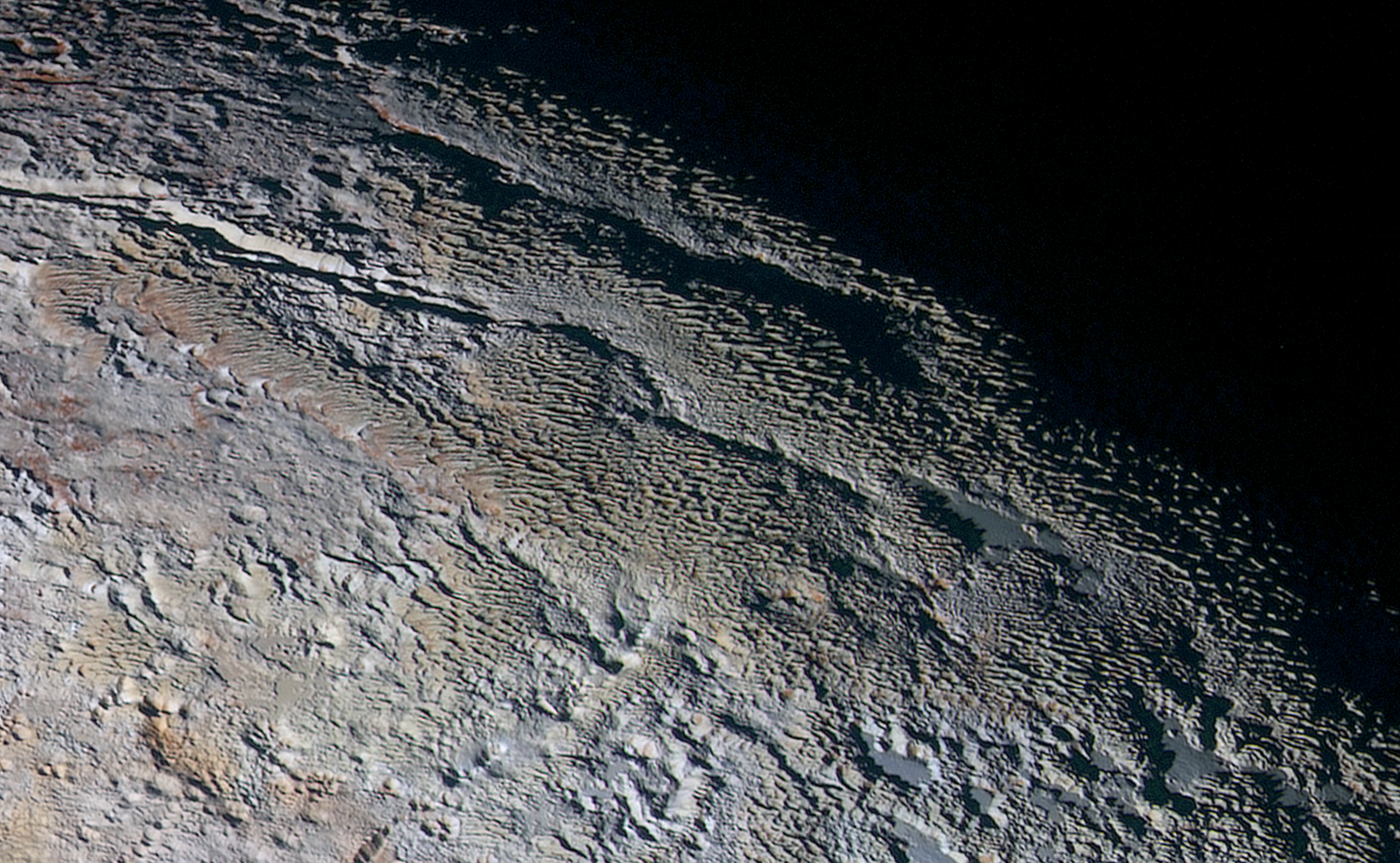
Patterns of blue-gray ridges and reddish material observed in the Tartarus Dorsa region on July 14, 2015

Meanwhile, Alice characterized the atmosphere, both by emissions of atmospheric molecules (airglow), and by dimming of background stars as they pass behind Pluto (occultation). During and after closest approach, SWAP and PEPSSI sampled the high atmosphere and its effects on the solar wind. VBSDC searched for dust, inferring meteoroid collision rates and any invisible rings. REX performed active and passive radio science. The communications dish on Earth measured the disappearance and reappearance of the radio occultation signal as the probe flew by behind Pluto. The results resolved Pluto's diameter (by their timing) and atmospheric density and composition (by their weakening and strengthening pattern). (Alice can perform similar occultations, using sunlight instead of radio beacons.) Previous missions had the spacecraft transmit through the atmosphere, to Earth ("downlink"). Pluto's mass and mass distribution were evaluated by the gravitational tug on the spacecraft. As the spacecraft speeds up and slows down, the radio signal exhibited a Doppler shift. The Doppler shift was measured by comparison with the ultrastable oscillator in the communications electronics.

Reflected sunlight from Charon allowed some imaging observations of the nightside. Backlighting by the Sun gave an opportunity to highlight any rings or atmospheric hazes. REX performed radiometry of the nightside.

=== Satellite observations ===
New Horizons' best spatial resolution of the small satellites is 330 m per pixel (1,080 ft/px) at Nix, 780 m/px (2,560 ft/px) at Hydra, and approximately 1.8 km/px (1.1 mi/px) at Kerberos and Styx. Estimates for the dimensions of these bodies are: Nix at 49.8 × 33.2 × 31.1 km (30.9 × 20.6 × 19.3 mi); Hydra at 50.9 × 36.1 × 30.9 km (31.6 × 22.4 × 19.2 mi); Kerberos at 19 × 10 × 9 km (11.8 × 6.2 × 5.6 mi); and Styx at 16 × 9 × 8 km (9.9 × 5.6 × 5.0 mi).

Initial predictions envisioned Kerberos as a relatively large and massive object whose dark surface led to it having a faint reflection. This proved to be wrong as images obtained by New Horizons on July 14 and sent back to Earth in October 2015 revealed that Kerberos was smaller in size, 19 km (12 mi) across with a highly reflective surface suggesting the presence of relatively clean water ice similarly to the rest of Pluto's smaller moons.

Satellites of Pluto imaged by New Horizons

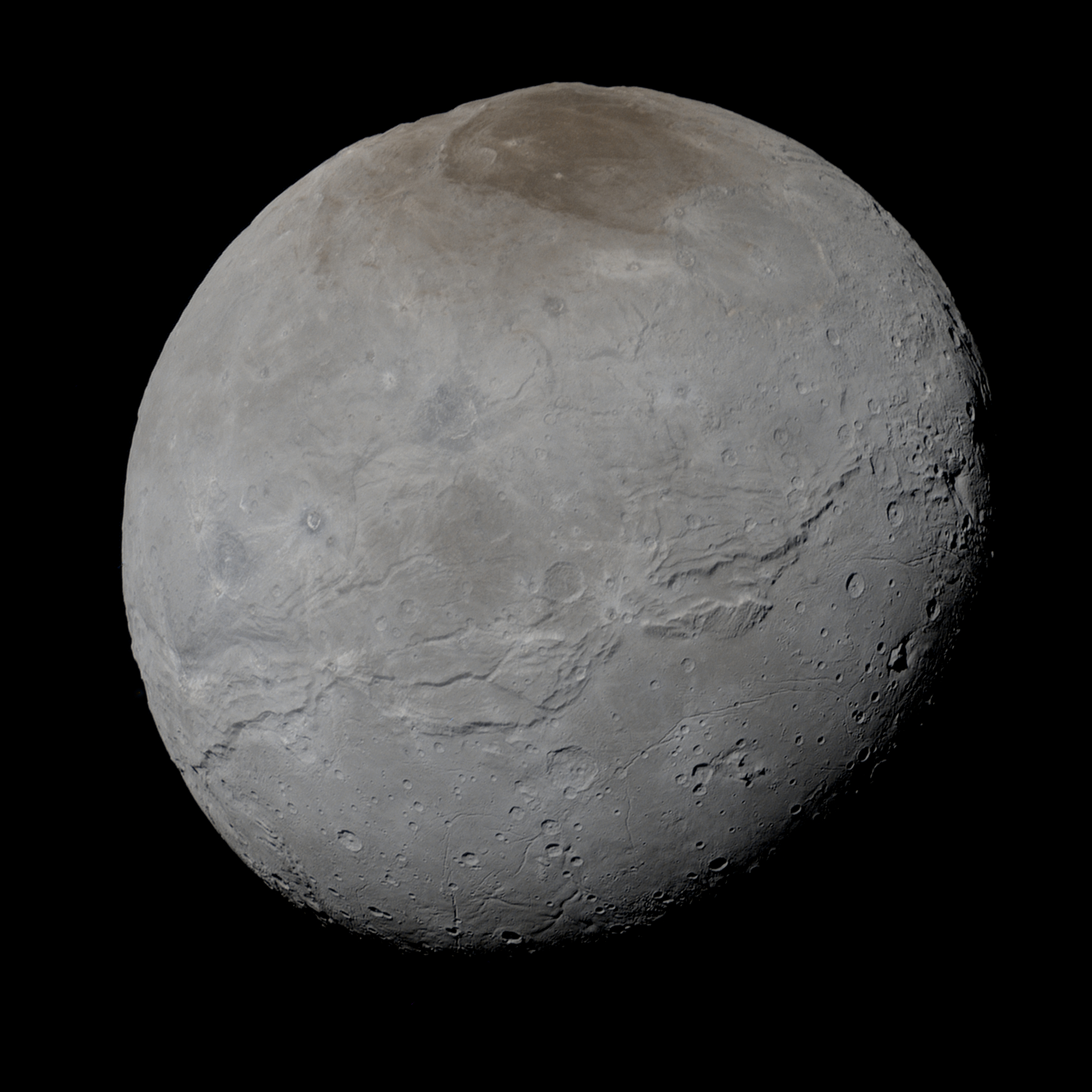
Charon

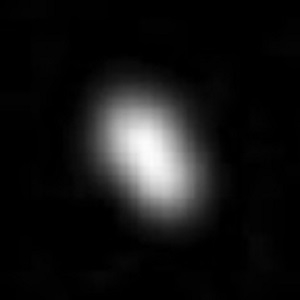
Styx

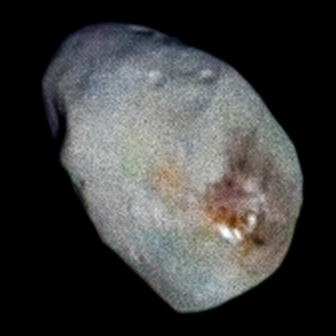
Nix

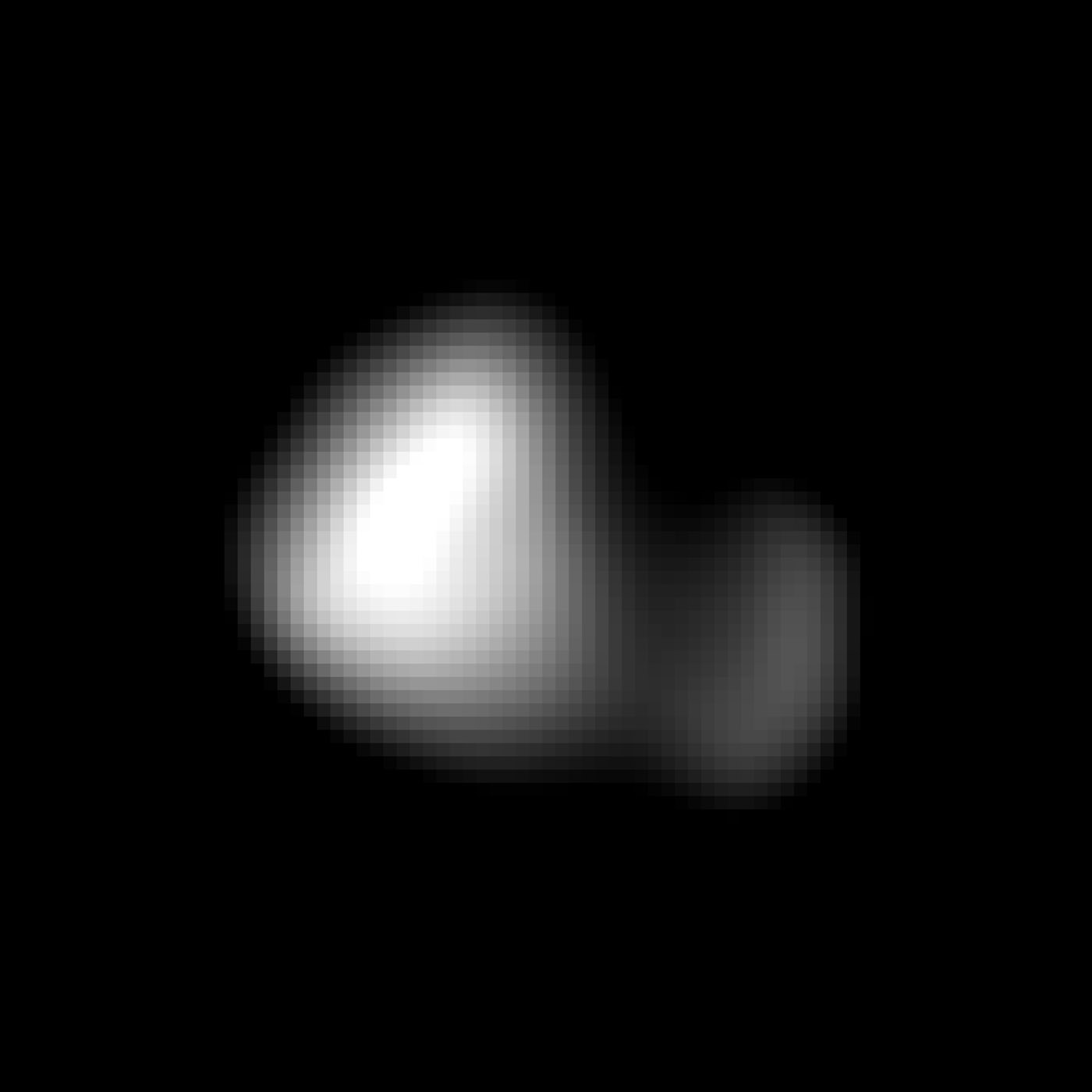
Kerberos

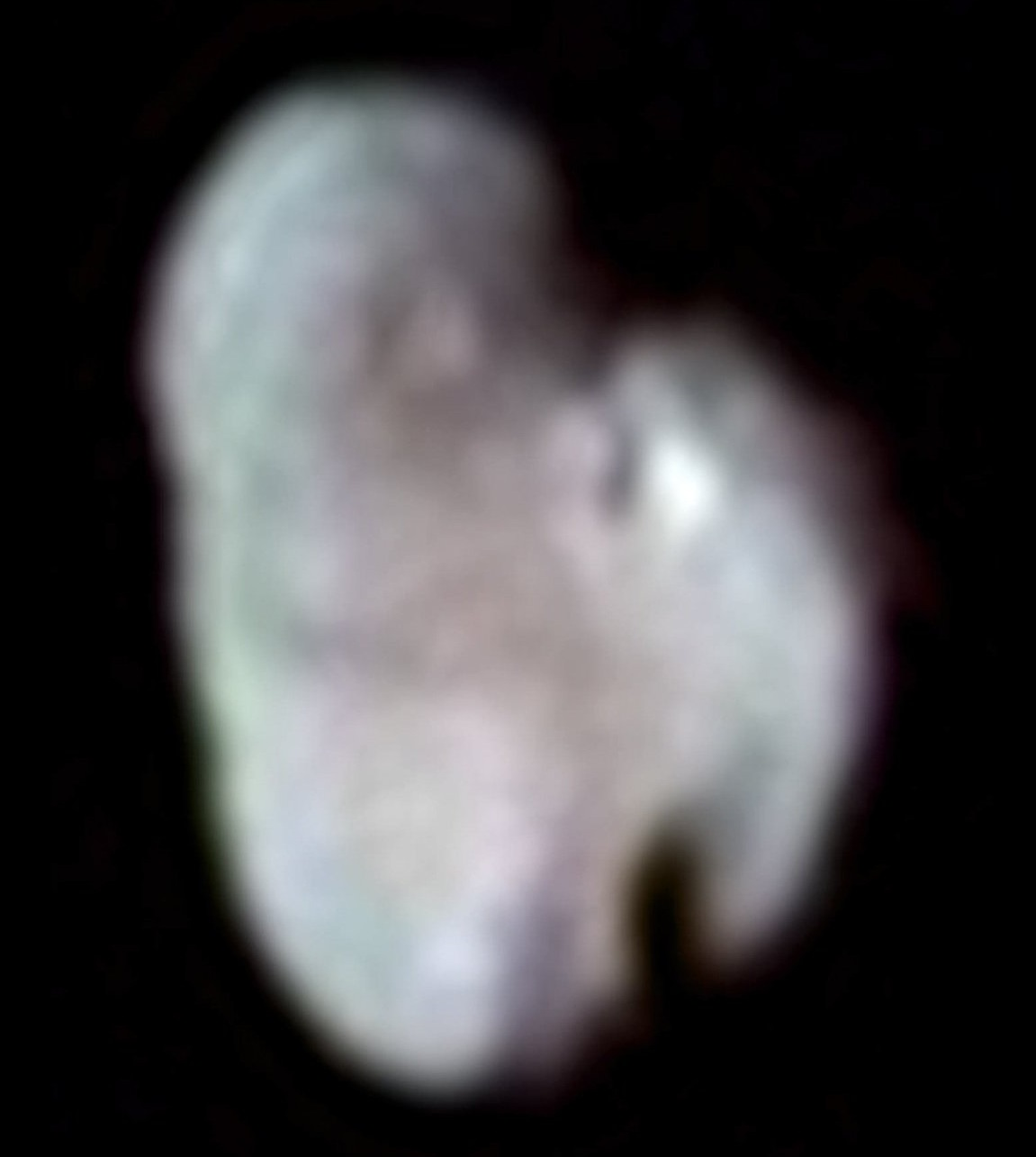
Hydra

Media related to Photos of Pluto system by New Horizons at Wikimedia Commons

== Post-Pluto events ==
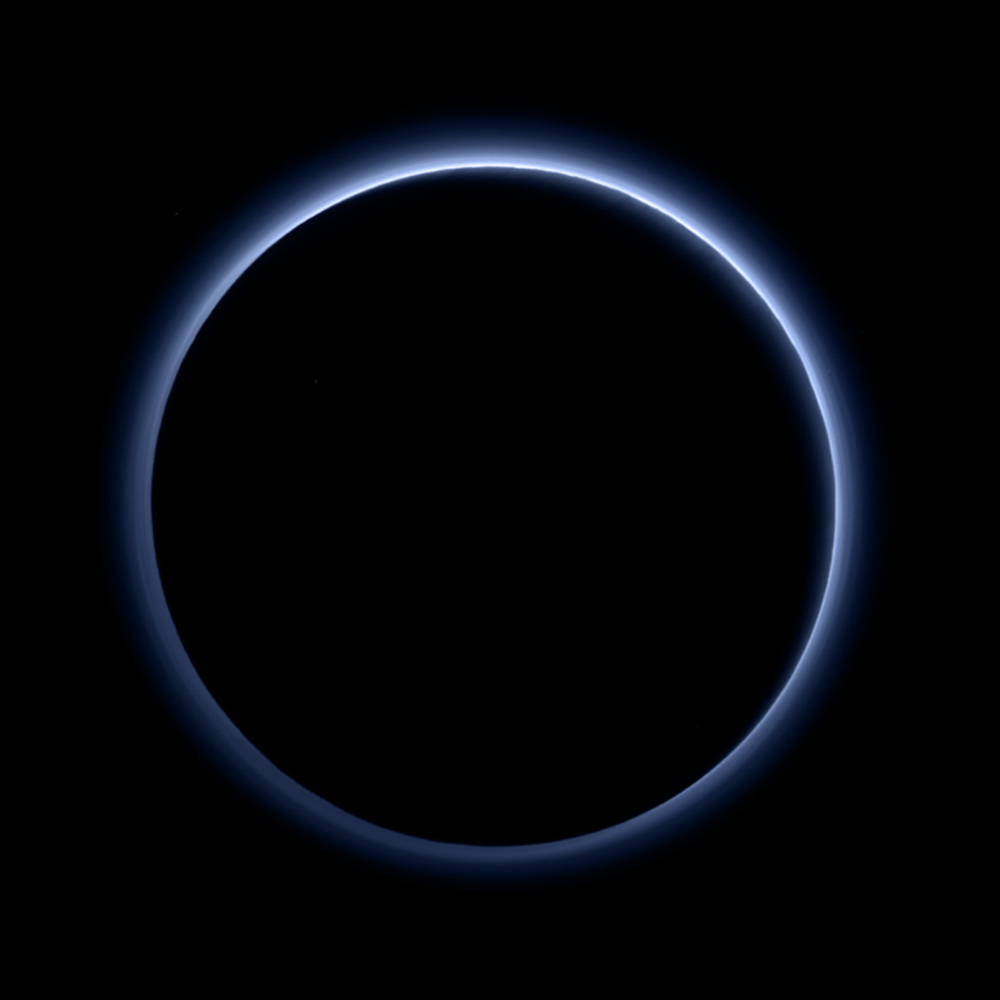
View of Pluto as New Horizons left the system, catching the Sun's rays passing through Pluto's atmosphere, forming a ring

Soon after the Pluto flyby, in July 2015, New Horizons reported that the spacecraft was healthy, its flight path was within the margins, and science data of the Pluto–Charon system had been recorded. The spacecraft's immediate task was to begin returning the 6.25 gigabytes of information collected. The free-space path loss at its distance of 4.5 light-hours (3 billion km or 20 AU or 1.9 billion mi) is approximately 303 dB at 7 GHz. Using the high gain antenna and transmitting at full power, the signal from EIRP is +83 dBm, and at this distance, the signal reaching Earth is −220 dBm. The received signal level (RSL) using one, un-arrayed Deep Space Network antenna with 72 dBi of forward gain equals −148 dBm. Because of the extremely low RSL, it could only transmit data at 1 to 2 kilobits per second.

By March 30, 2016, about nine months after the flyby, New Horizons reached the halfway point of transmitting this data. The transfer was completed on October 25, 2016, at 21:48 UTC, when the last piece of data—part of a Pluto–Charon observation sequence by the Ralph/LEISA imager—was received by the Johns Hopkins University Applied Physics Laboratory.

As of November 2018, at a distance of 43 AU (6.43 billion km; 4.00 billion mi) from the Sun and 0.4 AU (60 million km; 37 million mi) from 486958 Arrokoth, New Horizons was heading in the direction of the constellation Sagittarius at 14.10 km/s (8.76 mi/s; 2.97 AU/a) relative to the Sun. The brightness of the Sun from the spacecraft was magnitude −18.5.

On April 17, 2021, New Horizons reached a distance of 50 AU from the Sun, while remaining fully operational.

== Mission extension ==
Big picture: from the inner Solar System to the Oort cloud with the Kuiper belt in between

The New Horizons team requested, and received, a mission extension through 2021 to explore additional Kuiper belt objects (KBOs). Funding was secured on July 1, 2016. During this Kuiper Belt Extended Mission (KEM) the spacecraft performed a close fly-by of 486958 Arrokoth and will conduct more distant observations of an additional two dozen objects, and possibly make a fly-by of another KBO.

=== Kuiper belt object mission ===
==== Target background ====
Mission planners searched for one or more additional Kuiper belt objects (KBOs) of the order of 50–100 km (30–60 mi) in diameter as targets for flybys similar to the spacecraft's Plutonian encounter. However, despite the large population of KBOs, many factors limited the number of possible targets. Because the flight path was determined by the Pluto flyby, and the probe only had 33 kg (73 lb) of hydrazine propellant remaining, the object to be visited needed to be within a cone of less than a degree's width extending from Pluto. The target also needed to be within 55 AU, because beyond 55 AU, the communications link becomes too weak, and the RTG power output decays significantly enough to hinder observations. Desirable KBOs are well over 50 km (30 mi) in diameter, neutral in color (to contrast with the reddish Pluto), and, if possible, have a moon that imparts a wobble.

==== KBO Search ====
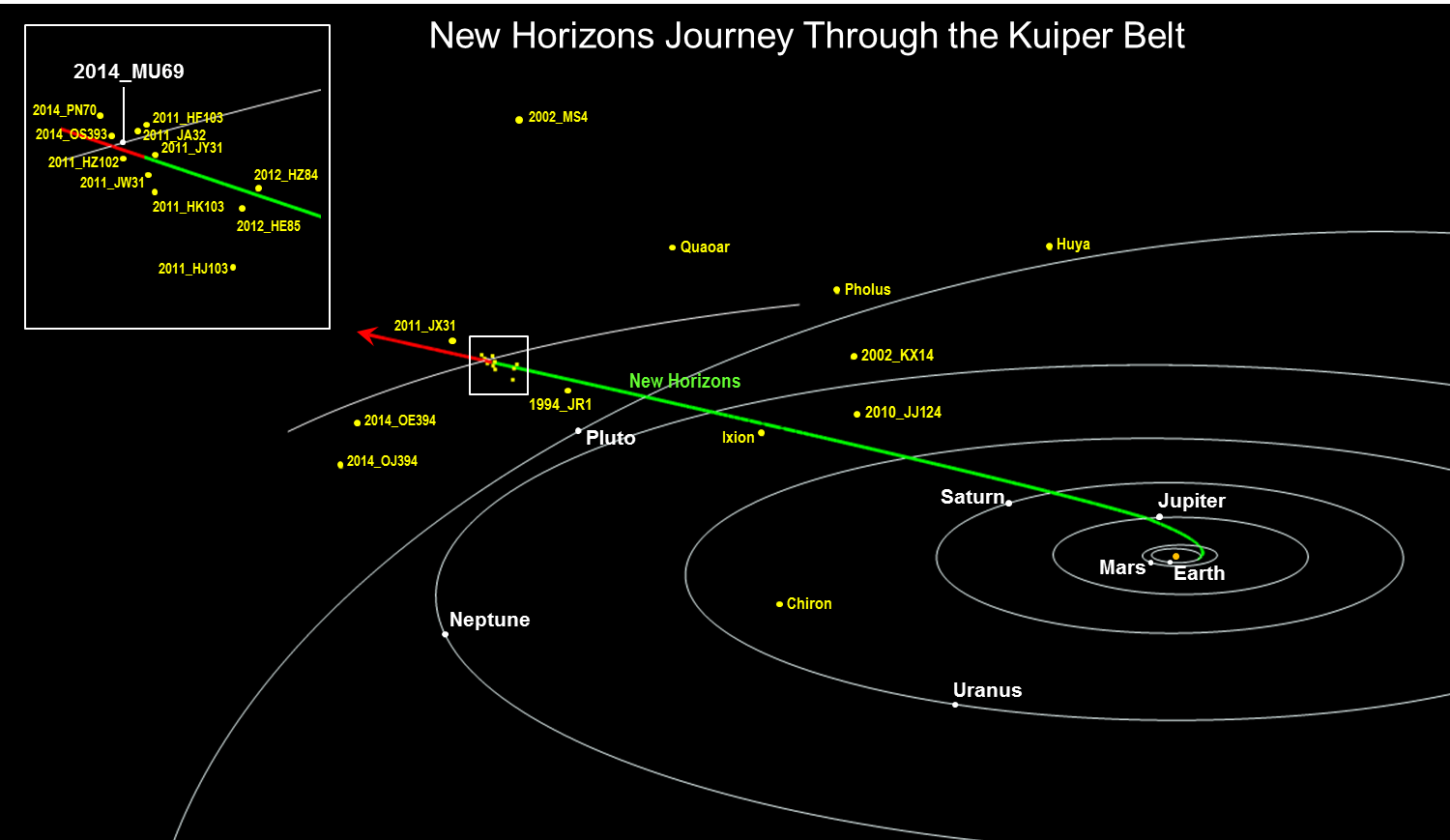
Trajectory of New Horizons and other nearby Kuiper belt objects

In 2011, mission scientists started the New Horizons KBO Search, a dedicated survey for suitable KBOs using ground telescopes. Large ground telescopes with wide-field cameras, notably the twin 6.5-meter Magellan Telescopes in Chile, the 8.2-meter Subaru Observatory in Hawaii and the Canada–France–Hawaii Telescope were used to search for potential targets. By participating in a citizen-science project called Ice Hunters the public helped to scan telescopic images for possible suitable mission candidates. The ground-based search resulted in the discovery of about 143 KBOs of potential interest, but none of these were close enough to the flight path of New Horizons. Only the Hubble Space Telescope was deemed likely to find a suitable target in time for a successful KBO mission. On June 16, 2014, time on Hubble was granted for a search. Hubble has a much greater ability to find suitable KBOs than ground telescopes. The probability that a target for New Horizons would be found was estimated beforehand at about 95%.

==== Suitable KBOs ====
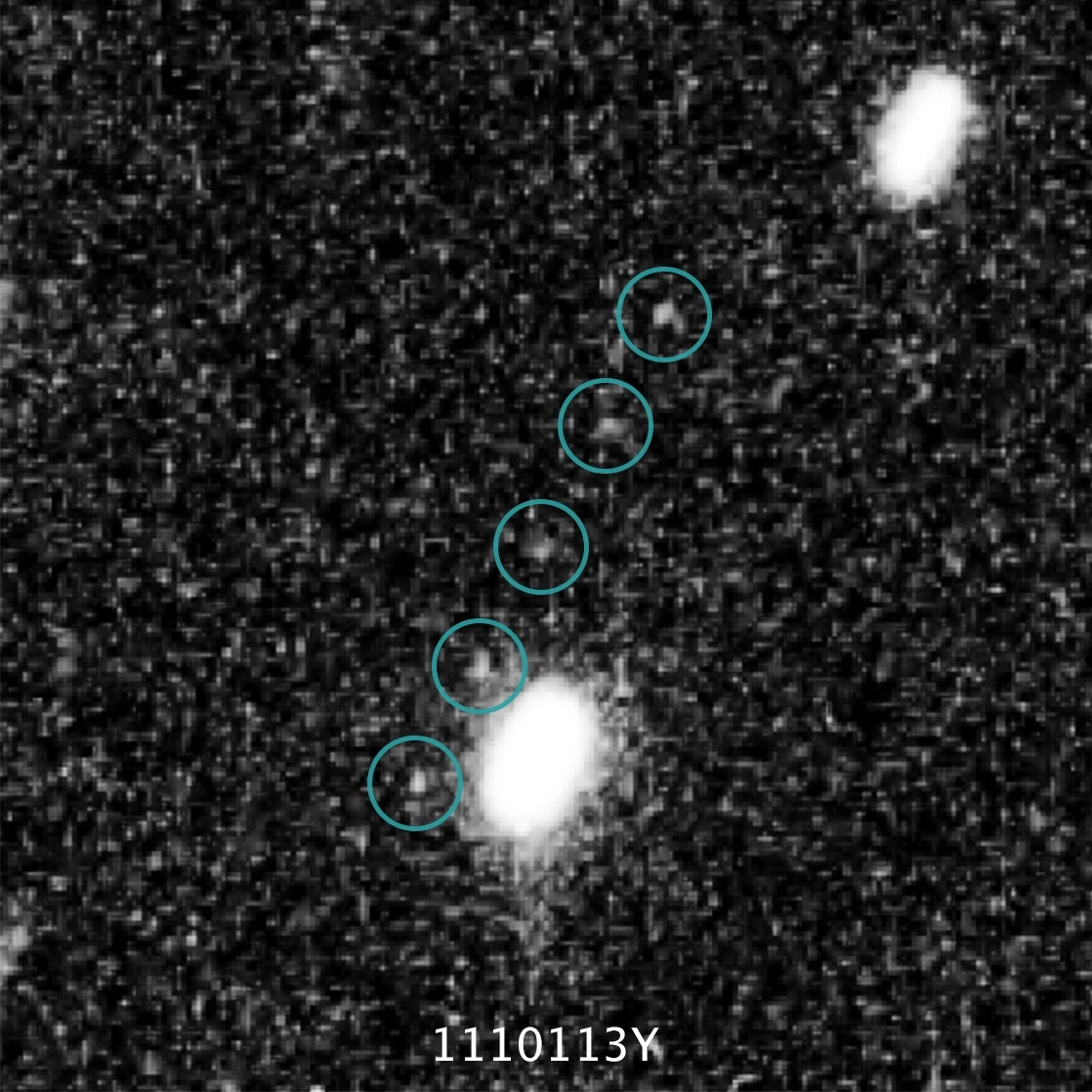
486958 Arrokoth, the target for the Kuiper belt object mission

On October 15, 2014, it was revealed that Hubble's search had uncovered three potential targets, temporarily designated PT1 ("potential target 1"), PT2 and PT3 by the New Horizons team. PT1 was eventually chosen as the target and would be named 486958 Arrokoth.

All objects had estimated diameters in the 30–55 km (19–34 mi) range and were too small to be seen by ground telescopes. The targets were at distances from the Sun ranging from 43 to 44 AU, which would put the encounters in the 2018–2019 period. The initial estimated probabilities that these objects were reachable within New Horizons' fuel budget were 100%, 7%, and 97%, respectively. All were members of the "cold" (low-inclination, low-eccentricity) classical Kuiper belt objects, and thus were very different from Pluto.

PT1 (given the temporary designation "1110113Y" on the HST web site), the most favorably situated object, had a magnitude of 26.8, is 30–45 km (19–28 mi) in diameter, and was encountered in January 2019. A course change to reach it required about 35% of New Horizons' available trajectory-adjustment fuel supply. A mission to PT3 was in some ways preferable, in that it is brighter and therefore probably larger than PT1, but the greater fuel requirements to reach it would have left less for maneuvering and unforeseen events.

Once sufficient orbital information was provided, the Minor Planet Center gave provisional designations to the three target KBOs: 2014 MU_{69} (PT1' later 486958 Arrokoth), 2014 OS393 (PT2), and 2014 PN70 (PT3). By the fall of 2014, a possible fourth target, 2014 MT69, had been eliminated by follow-up observations. PT2 was out of the running before the Pluto flyby.

==== KBO selection ====
On August 28, 2015, 486958 Arrokoth (then known as (486958) 2014 MU_{69} and nicknamed Ultima Thule) (PT1) was chosen as the flyby target. The necessary course adjustment was performed with four engine firings between October 22 and November 4, 2015. The flyby occurred on January 1, 2019, at 00:33 UTC.

=== Observations of other KBOs ===
Aside from its flyby of 486958 Arrokoth, the extended mission for New Horizons calls for the spacecraft to conduct observations of, and look for ring systems around, between 25 and 35 different KBOs. In addition, it will continue to study the gas, dust and plasma composition of the Kuiper belt before the mission extension ends in 2021.

On November 2, 2015, New Horizons imaged KBO 15810 Arawn with the LORRI instrument from 280 million km away (170 million mi; 1.9 AU). This KBO was again imaged by the LORRI instrument on April 7–8, 2016, from a distance of 111 million km (69 million mi; 0.74 AU). The new images allowed the science team to further refine the location of 15810 Arawn to within 1,000 km (620 mi) and to determine its rotational period of 5.47 hours.

In July 2016, the LORRI camera captured some distant images of Quaoar from 2.1 billion km away (1.3 billion mi; 14 AU); the oblique view will complement Earth-based observations to study the object's light-scattering properties.

On December 5, 2017, when New Horizons was 40.9 AU from Earth, a calibration image of the Wishing Well cluster marked the most distant image ever taken by a spacecraft (breaking the 27-year record set by Voyager 1's Pale Blue Dot). Two hours later, New Horizons surpassed its own record, imaging the Kuiper belt objects 2012 HZ_{84} and 2012 HE_{85} from a distance of 0.50 and 0.34 AU, respectively. These were the closest images taken of a Kuiper belt object besides Pluto and Arrokoth as of February 2018.

The dwarf planet Haumea was observed from afar by the New Horizons spacecraft in October 2007, January 2017, and May 2020, from distances of 49 AU, 59 AU, and 63 AU, respectively. New Horizons has observed the dwarf planets Eris (2020), Haumea (2007, 2017, 2020), Makemake (2007, 2017), and Quaoar (2016, 2017, 2019), as well as the large KBOs Ixion (2016), Máni (2016, 2017, 2019), and 2014 OE_{394} (2017, 2018). It also observed Neptune's largest moon Triton (which shares similarities with Pluto and Eris) in 2019.

Extended mission imaging targets

15810 Arawn in April 2016

Quaoar in July 2016 at a distance of about 14 AU

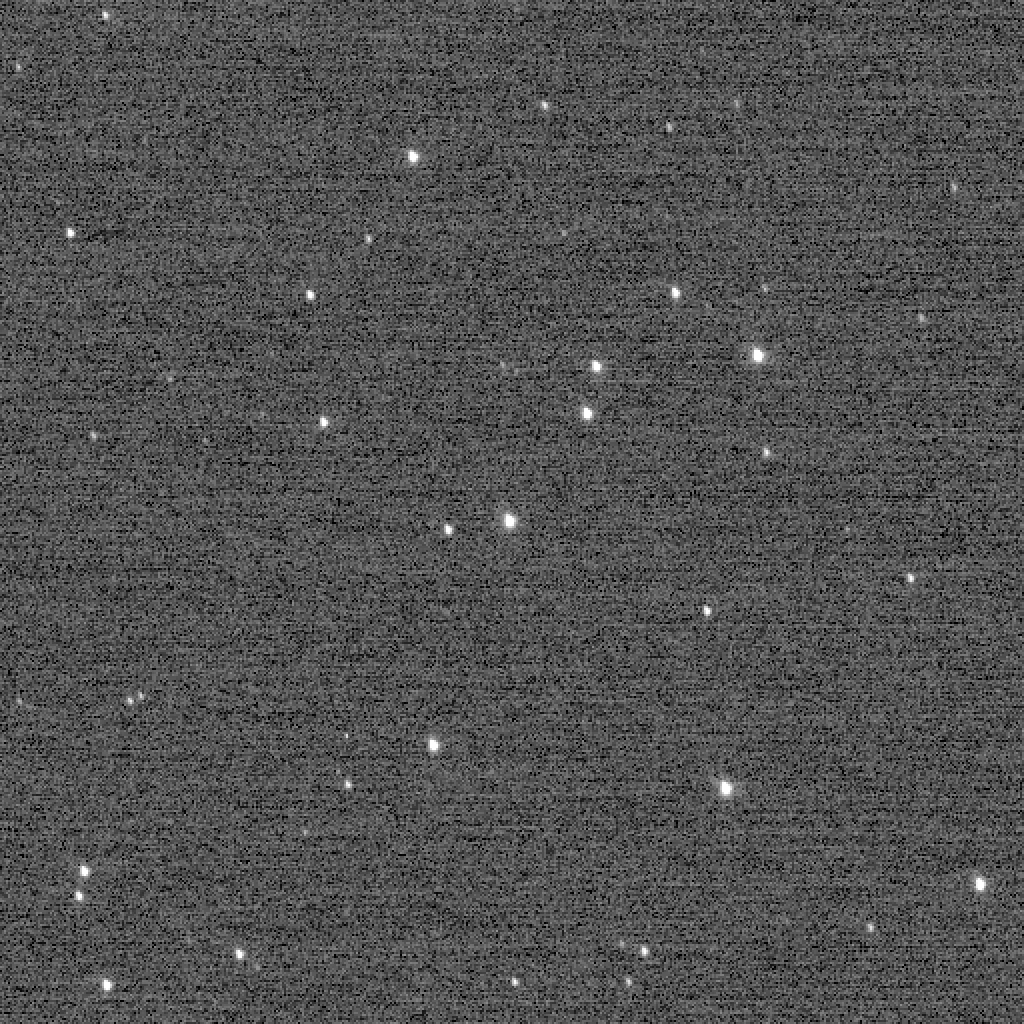
Calibration image of the Wishing Well cluster from December 2017

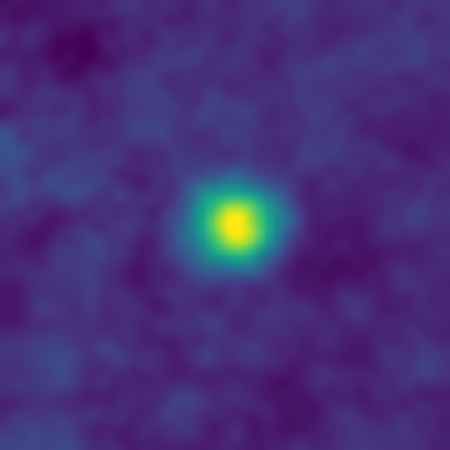
False-color image of 2012 HZ84 from December 2017

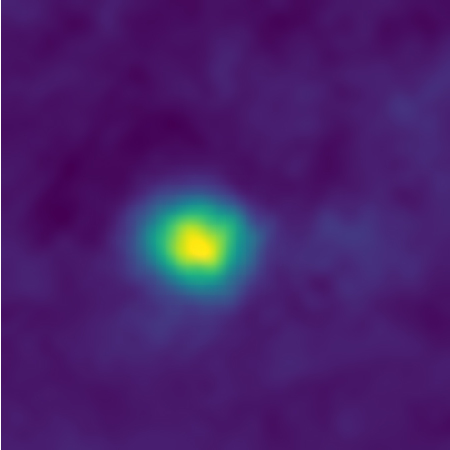
False-color image of 2012 HE85 from December 2017

Media related to Photos of Kuiper belt objects by New Horizons at Wikimedia Commons

By December 2023, New Horizons had discovered a total of about 100 KBOs, and flown close enough to about 20 of them to capture characteristics such as shape, rotational period, possible moons, and surface composition. In addition, since 2021, Canadian researchers had been able to use machine learning software to speed up identification processes of potential KBO targets for a third flyby, cutting weeks-long efforts to hours-long.

== Encounter with Arrokoth ==
Animation of New Horizons' flyby of Arrokoth in Eyes on the Solar System.

Animation of New Horizons's trajectory from January 19, 2006, to December 30, 2030 New Horizons · 486958 Arrokoth · Earth · 132524 APL · Jupiter · Pluto

=== Objectives ===
Science objectives of the flyby included characterizing the geology and morphology of Arrokoth and mapping the surface composition (by searching for ammonia, carbon monoxide, methane, and water ice). Searches will be conducted for orbiting moonlets, a coma, rings and the surrounding environment. Additional objectives include:

- Mapping the surface geology to learn how it formed and evolved
- Measuring the surface temperature
- Mapping the 3D surface topography and surface composition to learn how it is similar to and different from comets such as 67P/Churyumov–Gerasimenko and dwarf planets such as Pluto
- Searching for any signs of activity, such as a cloud-like coma
- Searching for and studying any satellites or rings
- Measuring or constraining the mass

=== Targeting maneuvers ===
Arrokoth is the first object to be targeted for a flyby that was discovered after the spacecraft was launched. New Horizons was planned to come within 3,500 km (2,200 mi) of Arrokoth, three times closer than the spacecraft's earlier encounter with Pluto. Images with a resolution of up to 30 m (100 ft) per pixel were expected.

The new mission began on October 22, 2015, when New Horizons carried out the first in a series of four initial targeting maneuvers designed to send it towards Arrokoth. The maneuver, which started at approximately 19:50 UTC and used two of the spacecraft's small hydrazine-fueled thrusters, lasted approximately 16 minutes and changed the spacecraft's trajectory by about 10 meters per second (33 ft/s). The remaining three targeting maneuvers took place on October 25, October 28, and November 4, 2015.

=== Approach phase ===
The craft was brought out of its hibernation at approximately 00:33 UTC SCET on June 5, 2018 (06:12 UTC ERT, Earth-Received Time), (Note: Confirmation that New Horizons exited hibernation was received by ground stations at 06:12 UTC. Spacecraft Event Time is calculated by subtracting the one-way light-travel time (5 hours, 38 minutes, 38 seconds) from Earth-received time.) in order to prepare for the approach phase. After verifying its health status, the spacecraft transitioned from a spin-stabilized mode to a three-axis-stabilized mode on August 13, 2018. The official approach phase began on August 16, 2018, and continued through December 24, 2018.

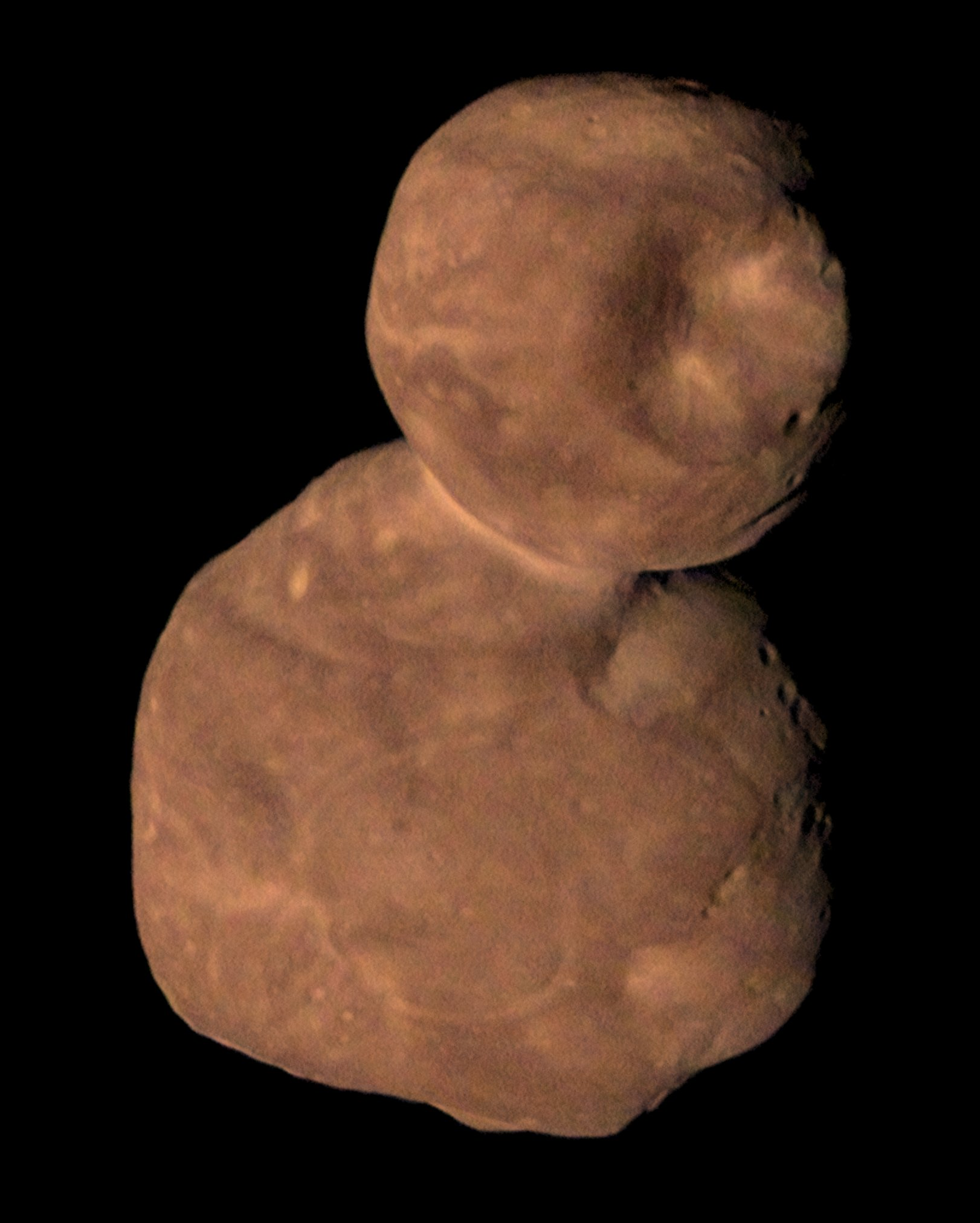
New Horizons image of Arrokoth

New Horizons made its first detection of Arrokoth on August 16, 2018, from a distance of 172 million km (107 million mi). At that time, Arrokoth was visible at magnitude 20 against a crowded stellar background in the direction of the constellation Sagittarius.

=== Flyby ===
The Core phase began a week before the encounter and continued for two days after the encounter. The spacecraft flew by the object at a speed of 51,500 km/h (32,000 mph; 14.3 km/s) and within 3,500 km (2,200 mi). The majority of the science data was collected within 48 hours of the closest approach in a phase called the Inner Core. Closest approach occurred January 1, 2019, at 05:33 UTC SCET at which point the probe was 43.4 AU from the Sun. At this distance, the one-way transit time for radio signals between Earth and New Horizons was six hours. Confirmation that the craft had succeeded in filling its digital recorders occurred when data arrived on Earth ten hours later, at 15:29 UTC.

=== Data download ===
After the encounter, preliminary, high-priority data was sent to Earth on January 1 and 2, 2019. On January 9, New Horizons returned to a spin-stabilized mode to prepare sending the remainder of its data back to Earth. This download was expected to take 20 months at a data rate of 1–2 kilobits per second. As of July 2022, approximately 10% of the data was still left to be received.

== Post-Arrokoth events ==
Parallax of Proxima Centauri as observed from New Horizons and Earth.

In April 2020, New Horizons was used in conjunction with telescopes on Earth to take pictures of nearby stars Proxima Centauri and Wolf 359; the images from each vantage point – over 6.4 billion km (4 billion miles) apart – were compared to produce "the first demonstration of an easily observable stellar parallax."

Images taken by the LORRI camera while New Horizons was 42 to 45 AU from the Sun were used to measure the cosmic optical background, the visible light analog of the cosmic microwave background, in seven high galactic latitude fields. At that distance New Horizons saw a sky ten times darker than the sky seen by the Hubble Space Telescope because of the absence of diffuse background sky brightness from the zodiacal light in the inner solar system. These measurements indicate that the total amount of light emitted by all galaxies at ultraviolet and visible wavelengths may be lower than previously thought.

New Horizons' position

The spacecraft reached a distance of 50 AU (7.5 billion km; 4.6 billion mi) on April 17, 2021, at 12:42 UTC, a feat performed only four times before, by Pioneer 10, Pioneer 11, Voyager 1, and Voyager 2. Voyager 1 is the farthest spacecraft from the Sun, more than 152 AU (22.7 billion km; 14.1 billion mi) away when New Horizons reached its landmark in 2021. The support team continued to use the spacecraft in 2021 to study the heliospheric environment (plasma, dust and gas) and to study other Kuiper Belt objects.

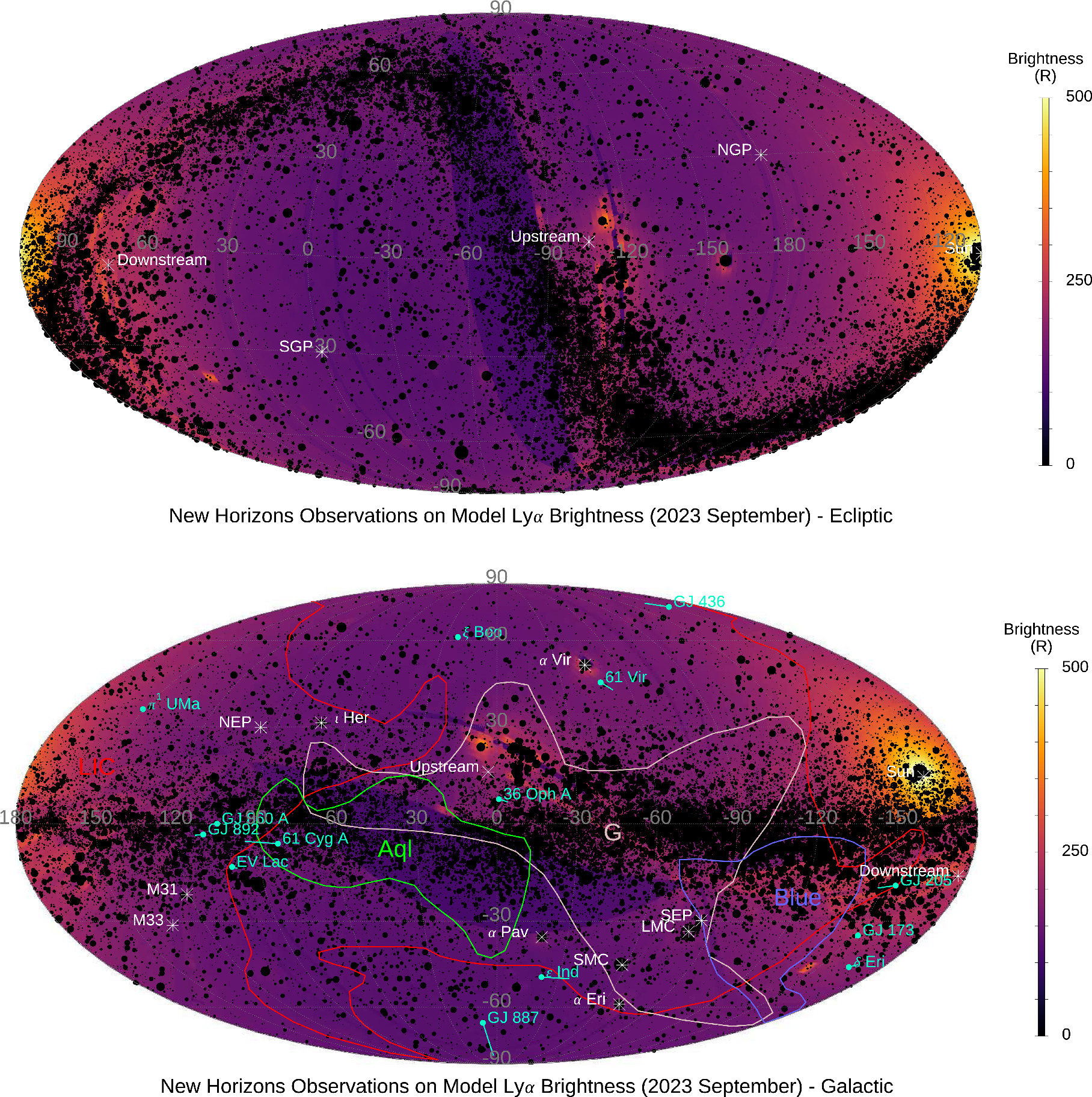
The All-sky New Horizons Alice Lyα maps in ecliptic coordinates centered on the anti-Sun direction, and the lower map is in Galactic coordinates. The ~90,000 stars in the M. A. Velez et al. (2024) catalog are overlaid as black dots, where the size of the dot is proportional to the logarithm of the expected Alice count rate from each star. The map in Galactic coordinates indicates the outlines of four of the important LISM clouds ("LIC," in red; "Aql," in green; "Blue," in blue; and "G," in tan).

In 2025, the first map of all Lyman-Alpha emissions in the Milky Way galaxy was published, based on New Horizons observations.

=== Plans ===
After the spacecraft passed Arrokoth, the instruments continue to have enough power to be operational until the 2030s.

Team leader Alan Stern stated there is potential for a third flyby in the 2020s at the outer edges of the Kuiper belt. This depends on a suitable Kuiper belt object being found or confirmed close enough to the spacecraft's current trajectory. Since May 2020, the New Horizons team has been using time on the Subaru Telescope to look for suitable candidates within the spacecraft's proximity. As of October 2026, no suitable targets had been found. Beginning in fiscal year 2025, it was planned for New Horizons to focus on specific heliophysics data, as stated by NASA in September 2023. It will remain available for a flyby of a different target until it leaves the Kuiper belt in 2028.

New Horizons may also take a picture of Earth from its distance in the Kuiper belt, but only after completing all planned KBO flybys and imaging Uranus and Neptune. This is because pointing a camera towards Earth could cause the camera to be damaged by sunlight, as none of New Horizons' cameras have an active shutter mechanism.

== Speed ==
Speed and distance from the Sun

New Horizons has been called "the fastest spacecraft ever launched" because it left Earth at 16.26 kilometers per second (58,536 km/h; 36,373 mph). It is also the first spacecraft launched directly into a solar escape trajectory, which requires an approximate speed while near Earth of 16.5 km/s (59,000 km/h; 37,000 mph), (Note: To escape the Sun, the spacecraft needs a speed relative to the Sun of the square root of 2 times the speed of the Earth, which is 29.78 km/s. (In other words, $\sqrt2\cdot 29.78 \text{ km/s}\approx 42.11\text{ km/s}$.) Relative to the Earth, this is just 12.3 km/s. But the kinetic energy when near the surface of the Earth must include the energy to exit the gravity well of the Earth, which requires a speed of about 11 km/s. The total speed needed is the square root of the sum of the squares of these two speeds.) plus additional delta-v to cover air and gravity drag, all to be provided by the launch vehicle. As of May 2, 2024, the spacecraft is 58.80 AU (8.796 billion km; 5.466 billion mi) from the Sun traveling at 13.68 kilometres per second (49,200 km/h; 30,600 mph).

However, it is not the fastest spacecraft to leave the Solar System. As of July 2023, this record is held by Voyager 1, traveling at 16.985 km/s (61,146 km/h; 37,994 mph) relative to the Sun. Voyager 1 attained greater hyperbolic excess velocity than New Horizons due to gravity assists by Jupiter and Saturn. When New Horizons reaches the distance of 100 AU (15 billion km; 9.3 billion mi), it will be traveling at about 13 km/s (47,000 km/h; 29,000 mph), around 4 km/s (14,000 km/h; 8,900 mph) slower than Voyager 1 at that distance. The Parker Solar Probe can also be measured as the fastest object, because of its orbital speed relative to the Sun at perihelion: 191 km/s (690,000 km/h; 430,000 mph). Because it remains in solar orbit, its specific orbital energy relative to the Sun is lower than New Horizons and other artificial objects escaping the Solar System.

New Horizons' Star 48B third stage is also on a hyperbolic escape trajectory from the Solar System and reached Jupiter before the New Horizons spacecraft; it was expected to cross Pluto's orbit on October 15, 2015. Because it was not in controlled flight, it did not receive the correct gravity assist and passed within 200 million km (120 million mi) of Pluto. The Centaur second stage did not achieve solar escape velocity and remains in a heliocentric orbit.

== Gallery ==
=== Images of the launch ===
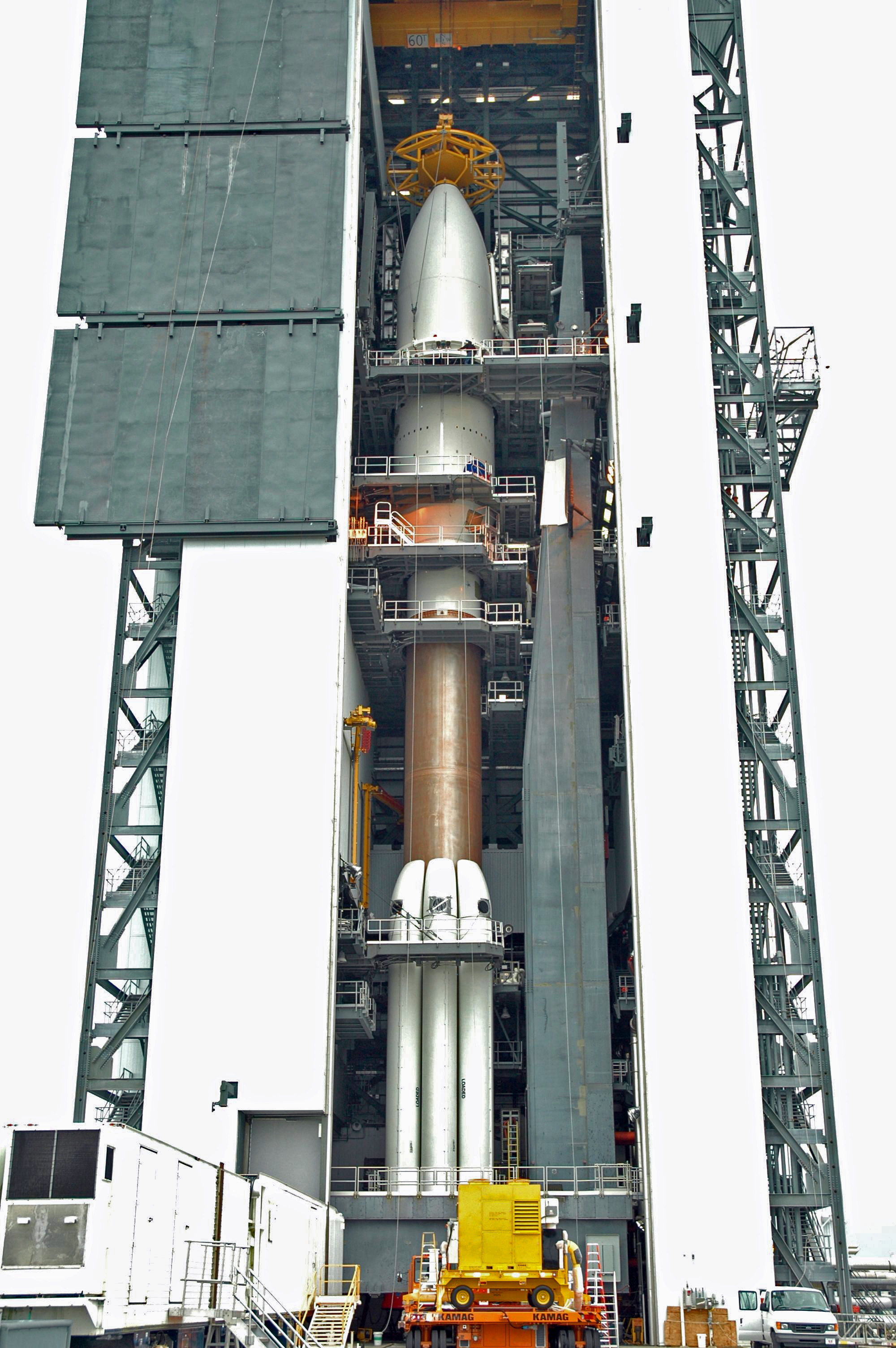
The Atlas V 551 rocket, used to launch New Horizons, being processed a month before launch.

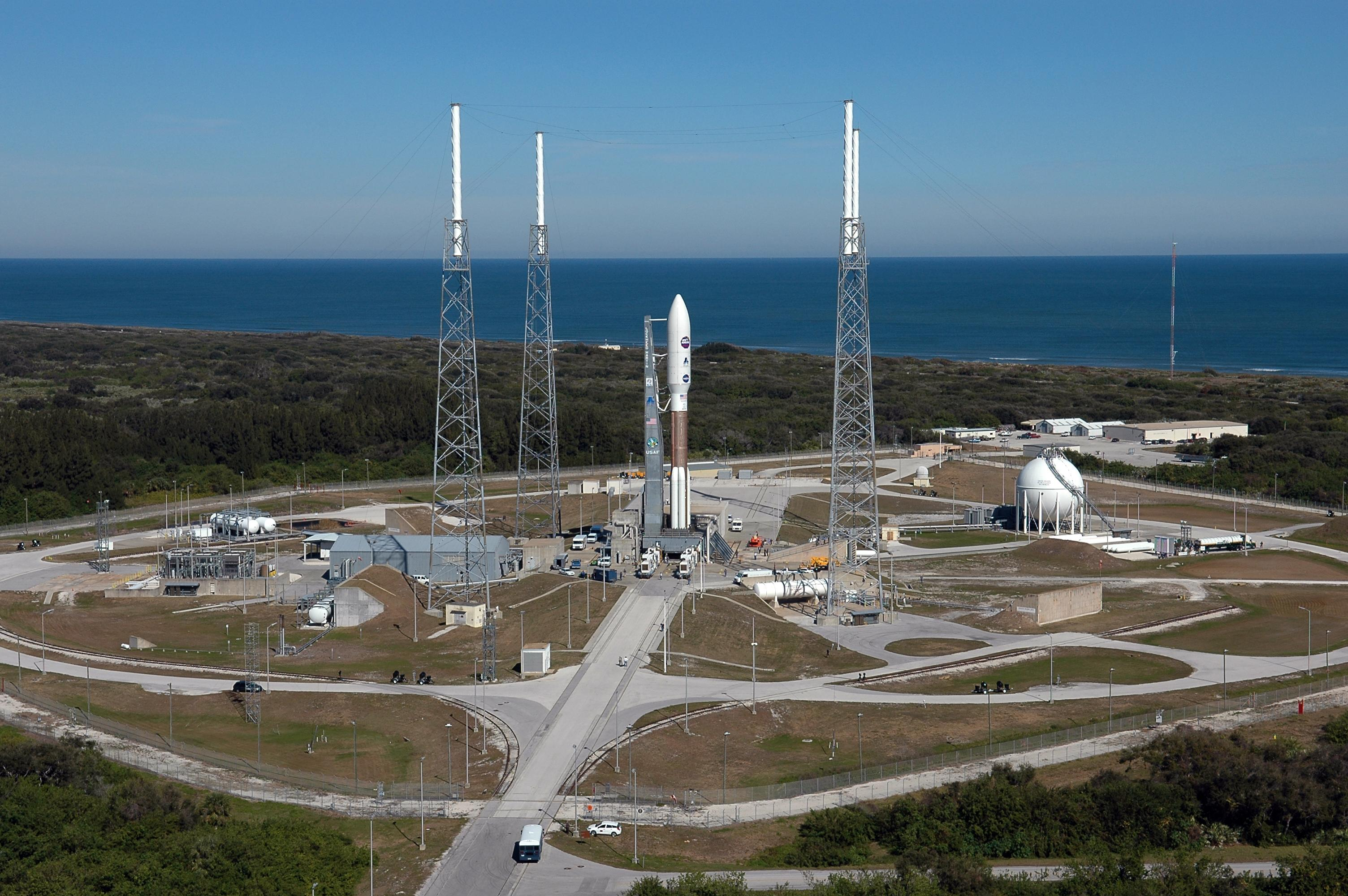
View of Cape Canaveral Launch Complex 41, with the Atlas V carrying New Horizons on the pad.

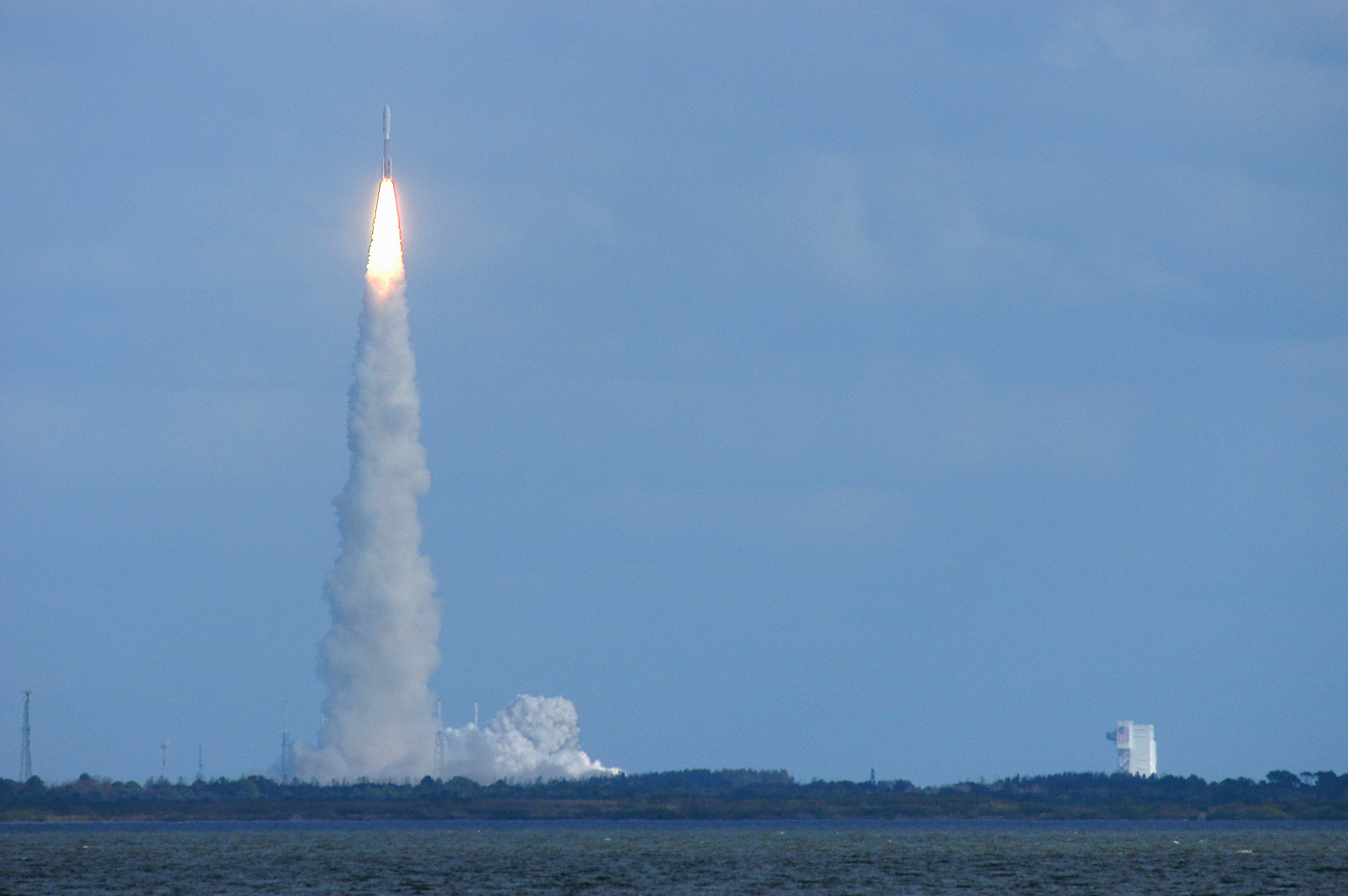
Distant view of Cape Canaveral during the launch of New Horizons on January 19, 2006.

NASA TV footage of New Horizons' launch from Cape Canaveral. (4:00)

=== Videos ===
(00:30; released September 18, 2015)

(00:50; released December 5, 2015)

== See also ==
- 2006 in spaceflight
- Exploration of Pluto
- Exploration of dwarf planets
- List of artificial objects leaving the Solar System
- List of missions to the outer planets
- List of New Horizons topics
- Mariner Mark II, a planned family of NASA spacecraft including a Pluto mission
- New Horizons 2, a proposed trans-Neptunian object flyby mission
- Pioneer 10
- Pioneer 11
- Pluto Kuiper Express, a cancelled NASA Pluto flyby mission
- TAU, a proposed mission to fly by Pluto
- Timeline of Solar System exploration
- Voyager 1
- Voyager 2
