= (516977) 2012 HZ84 =

Trans-Neptunian object

(516977) 2012 HZ_{84}
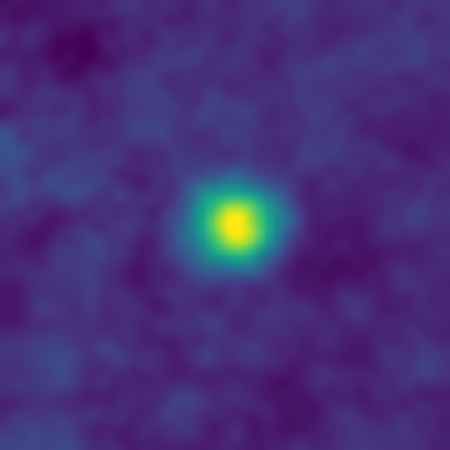
- False-color image of 2012 HZ_{84} taken by New Horizons in December 2017

Discovery
- Discovered by: New Horizons KBO Search
- Discovery site: Las Campanas Obs.
- Discovery date: 17 April 2012

Designations
- Minor planet category: TNO · NearScat cubewano · distant

Orbital characteristics
- Epoch 27 April 2019 (JD 2458600.5)
- Uncertainty parameter 4 · 2
- Observation arc: 5.18 yr (1,893 d)
- Aphelion: 55.445 AU
- Perihelion: 37.219 AU
- Semi-major axis: 46.332 AU
- Eccentricity: 0.1967
- Orbital period (sidereal): 315.38 yr (115,191 d)
- Mean anomaly: 321.81°
- Mean motion: 0° 0^{m} 11.16^{s} / day
- Inclination: 5.4328°
- Longitude of ascending node: 257.02°
- Argument of perihelion: 86.064°

Physical characteristics
- Mean diameter: 74 km (est. at 0.09)
- Absolute magnitude (H): 8.9

(516977) 2012 HZ_{84} is a small trans-Neptunian object from the Kuiper belt located in the outermost region of the Solar System, approximately 74 kilometers (46 miles) in diameter. It was discovered on 17 April 2012, by a team of astronomers using one of the Magellan Telescopes in Chile during the New Horizons KBO Search in order to find a potential flyby target for the New Horizons spacecraft. In December 2017, this classical Kuiper belt object was imaged by the spacecraft from afar at a record distance from Earth.

== Orbit and classification ==
2012 HZ_{84} orbits the Sun at a distance of 37.2–55.4 AU once every 315 years and 5 months (semi-major axis of 46.33 AU). Its orbit has an eccentricity of 0.20 and an inclination of 5.4° with respect to the ecliptic.

As a cubewano, also known as a classical Kuiper belt object, 2012 HZ_{84} is located in between the resonant plutino and twotino populations and has a low-eccentricity orbit. It belongs to the "stirred" hot population, but only just, since the rather arbitrary threshold to the cold population is typically defined for inclinations lower than 5°.

In the object classification of the Deep Ecliptic Survey, however, 2012 HZ_{84} has a secured SCATNEAR type, which is a combination of the SCAT and NEAR attributes. It means that the object does not cross the orbit of Neptune but has a higher inclination and eccentricity (SCAT) than the survey's CLASSICAL type objects, and it currently interacts with the dominant ice giant Neptune (NEAR), contrary to the much less gravitationally affected objects of the EXTD type.

The body's observation arc begins with its first observation on 17 April 2012, made by astronomers David Osip, Paul Schechter, David Borncamp, Susan Benecchi and Scott Sheppard of the New Horizons KBO Search (268) team using the Magellan II (Clay) telescope at the Las Campanas Observatory, located in the Atacama desert in Chile.

== Milestone image ==
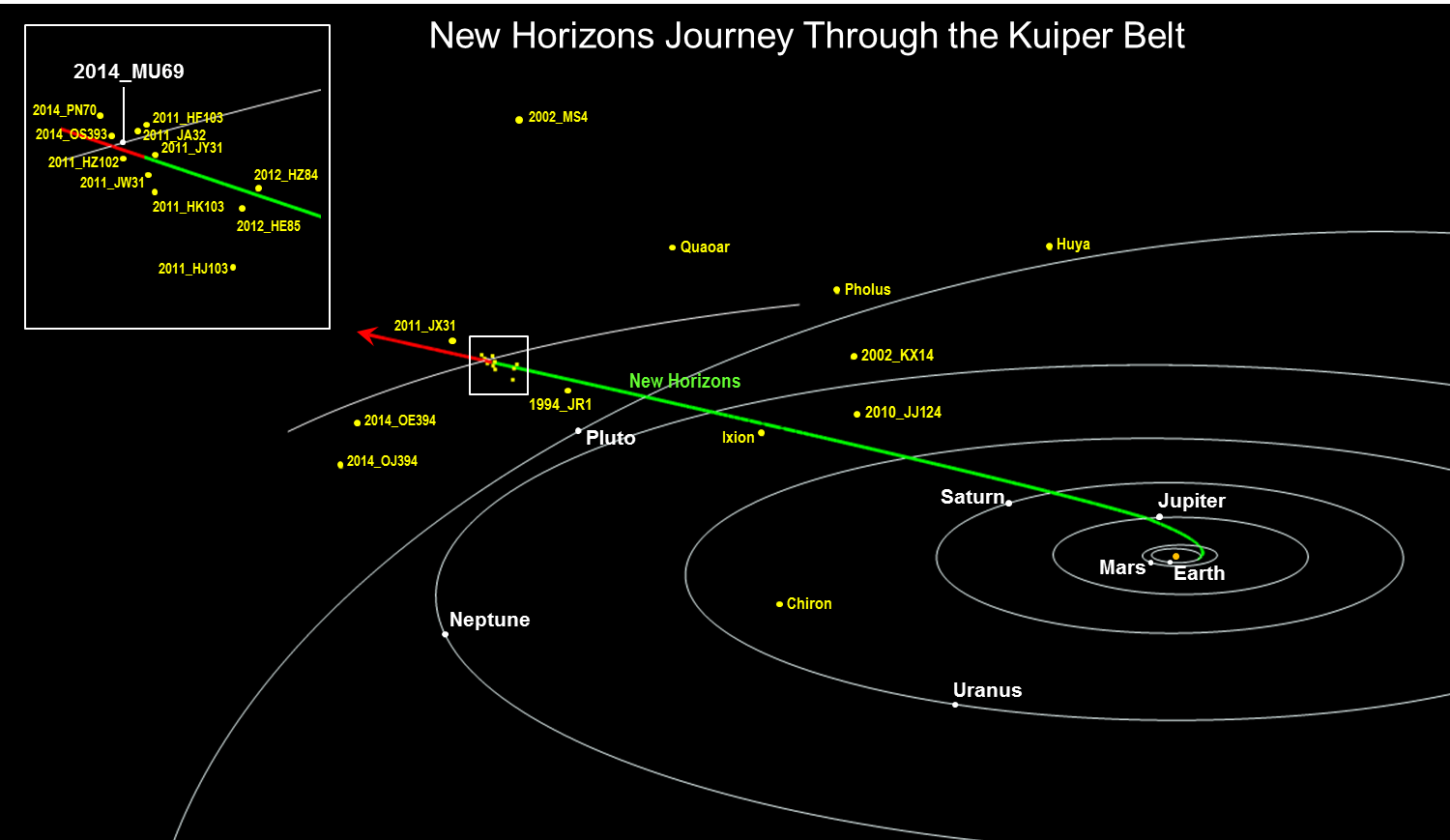
Trajectory of New Horizons and other nearby Kuiper belt objects

When the New Horizons spacecraft imaged 2012 HZ_{84} in 2017, it was the farthest from Earth ever captured by a spacecraft. The image was taken by the spacecraft's Long Range Reconnaissance Imager (LORRI) on 5 December 2017 at more than 6.12 billion kilometers (40.9 AU) away from Earth. This record was previously held by the Voyager 1 spacecraft which took the iconic Pale Blue Dot image at 6.06 billion kilometers from Earth in February 1990.

In December 2017, New Horizons also imaged the trans-Neptunian object 2012 HE85, which was first observed by the same team of astronomers the night after they discovered 2012 HZ_{84}. Both objects held this record for little more than one year, until it was superseded on New Year's Eve 2018/19, when New Horizons made its close flyby of 486958 Arrokoth at a new record distance of 6.4 billion kilometers from Earth.

== Numbering and naming ==
This minor planet was numbered by the Minor Planet Center on 30 April 2018 and received the number 516977 in the minor planet catalog (M.P.C. 110093). As of 2026, it has not been named.

== Physical characteristics ==
According to Johnston's Archive, the object measures 74 kilometers in diameter based on an assumed albedo of 0.09 and an absolute magnitude of 8.9. As of 2019, no rotational lightcurve of 2012 HZ_{84} has been obtained from photometric observations. The body's rotation period, pole and shape remain unknown.
