= List of minor planets: 516001–517000 =

The following is a partial list of minor planets, running from minor-planet number 516001 through 517000, inclusive. The primary data for this and other partial lists is based on JPL's "Small-Body Orbital Elements" and data available from the Minor Planet Center. Critical list information is also provided by the MPC, unless otherwise specified from Lowell Observatory. A detailed description of the table's columns and additional sources are given on the main page including a complete list of every page in this series, and a statistical break-up on the dynamical classification of minor planets.

Also see the summary list of all named bodies in numerical and alphabetical order, and the corresponding naming citations for the number range of this particular list. New namings may only be added to this list after official publication, as the preannouncement of names is condemned by the Working Group for Small Bodies Nomenclature of the International Astronomical Union.

Near-Earth obj.	MBA (inner)	MBA (outer)	Centaur
Mars-crosser	MBA (middle)	Jupiter trojan	Trans-Neptunian obj.
Unclassified

== 516001–516100 ==
Designation			Discovery			Properties		Ref
Permanent	Provisional	Named after	Date	Site	Discoverer(s)	Category	Diam.	Ref
516001	2015 RE_{242}	—	February 3, 2013	Haleakala	Pan-STARRS 1	·	1.3 km	MPC · JPL
516002	2015 RJ_{244}	—	October 25, 2011	Haleakala	Pan-STARRS 1	·	1.5 km	MPC · JPL
516003	2015 RP_{249}	—	October 1, 2005	Mount Lemmon	Mount Lemmon Survey	NAE	1.6 km	MPC · JPL
516004	2015 RS_{252}	—	April 5, 2005	Mount Lemmon	Mount Lemmon Survey	·	1.8 km	MPC · JPL
516005	2015 RD_{253}	—	September 29, 2005	Mount Lemmon	Mount Lemmon Survey	·	1.7 km	MPC · JPL
516006	2015 RE_{253}	—	October 7, 2005	Mount Lemmon	Mount Lemmon Survey	·	1.8 km	MPC · JPL
516007	2015 RL_{253}	—	December 24, 2006	Mount Lemmon	Mount Lemmon Survey	·	1.7 km	MPC · JPL
516008	2015 RN_{253}	—	October 31, 2010	Kitt Peak	Spacewatch	·	2.0 km	MPC · JPL
516009	2015 RB_{254}	—	January 21, 2012	Kitt Peak	Spacewatch	·	2.3 km	MPC · JPL
516010	2015 RF_{254}	—	October 20, 2006	Mount Lemmon	Mount Lemmon Survey	·	2.2 km	MPC · JPL
516011	2015 RH_{254}	—	October 26, 2011	Haleakala	Pan-STARRS 1	·	1.6 km	MPC · JPL
516012	2015 RR_{254}	—	March 9, 2007	Mount Lemmon	Mount Lemmon Survey	·	2.3 km	MPC · JPL
516013	2015 RY_{254}	—	February 21, 2007	Kitt Peak	Spacewatch	·	2.9 km	MPC · JPL
516014	2015 RD_{255}	—	October 1, 2006	Kitt Peak	Spacewatch	·	1.5 km	MPC · JPL
516015	2015 RG_{255}	—	March 11, 2007	Mount Lemmon	Mount Lemmon Survey	EUP	3.6 km	MPC · JPL
516016	2015 RP_{255}	—	January 10, 2013	Haleakala	Pan-STARRS 1	·	1.3 km	MPC · JPL
516017	2015 RW_{256}	—	February 11, 2008	Mount Lemmon	Mount Lemmon Survey	·	2.0 km	MPC · JPL
516018	2015 RC_{258}	—	September 19, 2006	Kitt Peak	Spacewatch	·	1.6 km	MPC · JPL
516019	2015 SH_{1}	—	March 10, 2008	Mount Lemmon	Mount Lemmon Survey	·	3.3 km	MPC · JPL
516020	2015 SK_{6}	—	June 5, 2010	WISE	WISE	·	2.3 km	MPC · JPL
516021	2015 SY_{7}	—	August 19, 2009	La Sagra	OAM	·	4.1 km	MPC · JPL
516022	2015 SJ_{12}	—	January 20, 2012	Mount Lemmon	Mount Lemmon Survey	URS	3.0 km	MPC · JPL
516023	2015 SJ_{13}	—	October 1, 2005	Mount Lemmon	Mount Lemmon Survey	·	3.1 km	MPC · JPL
516024	2015 SS_{16}	—	September 24, 2009	Catalina	CSS	EUP	3.5 km	MPC · JPL
516025	2015 SH_{23}	—	April 2, 2005	Mount Lemmon	Mount Lemmon Survey	EUN	930 m	MPC · JPL
516026	2015 SQ_{23}	—	May 3, 2005	Kitt Peak	Spacewatch	·	1.7 km	MPC · JPL
516027	2015 SY_{23}	—	September 25, 2006	Mount Lemmon	Mount Lemmon Survey	·	2.0 km	MPC · JPL
516028	2015 SZ_{23}	—	July 2, 2014	Haleakala	Pan-STARRS 1	·	2.4 km	MPC · JPL
516029	2015 SA_{24}	—	April 27, 2009	Mount Lemmon	Mount Lemmon Survey	·	1.8 km	MPC · JPL
516030	2015 SE_{24}	—	May 3, 2008	Mount Lemmon	Mount Lemmon Survey	·	2.4 km	MPC · JPL
516031	2015 SJ_{24}	—	May 16, 2013	Mount Lemmon	Mount Lemmon Survey	·	2.9 km	MPC · JPL
516032	2015 SP_{24}	—	January 11, 2008	Mount Lemmon	Mount Lemmon Survey	·	1.8 km	MPC · JPL
516033	2015 TV_{1}	—	September 30, 2006	Kitt Peak	Spacewatch	·	2.3 km	MPC · JPL
516034	2015 TQ_{4}	—	July 19, 2004	Anderson Mesa	LONEOS	·	1.3 km	MPC · JPL
516035	2015 TJ_{17}	—	October 11, 2010	Catalina	CSS	·	3.4 km	MPC · JPL
516036	2015 TU_{19}	—	November 24, 2011	Haleakala	Pan-STARRS 1	·	2.2 km	MPC · JPL
516037	2015 TZ_{50}	—	September 19, 2006	Catalina	CSS	·	1.8 km	MPC · JPL
516038	2015 TK_{62}	—	October 29, 2010	Mount Lemmon	Mount Lemmon Survey	EOS	1.7 km	MPC · JPL
516039	2015 TF_{75}	—	July 24, 2009	Siding Spring	SSS	·	1.9 km	MPC · JPL
516040	2015 TS_{106}	—	November 14, 2010	Mount Lemmon	Mount Lemmon Survey	·	2.1 km	MPC · JPL
516041	2015 TQ_{118}	—	August 22, 1998	Xinglong	SCAP	·	2.8 km	MPC · JPL
516042	2015 TS_{123}	—	August 15, 2009	Kitt Peak	Spacewatch	·	3.3 km	MPC · JPL
516043	2015 TL_{125}	—	May 15, 2013	Haleakala	Pan-STARRS 1	VER	2.4 km	MPC · JPL
516044	2015 TA_{131}	—	April 25, 2007	Kitt Peak	Spacewatch	VER	2.7 km	MPC · JPL
516045	2015 TV_{135}	—	March 11, 2007	Kitt Peak	Spacewatch	·	2.4 km	MPC · JPL
516046	2015 TL_{136}	—	June 28, 2014	Haleakala	Pan-STARRS 1	·	2.6 km	MPC · JPL
516047	2015 TC_{137}	—	December 5, 2010	Kitt Peak	Spacewatch	VER	2.6 km	MPC · JPL
516048	2015 TF_{137}	—	May 16, 2013	Haleakala	Pan-STARRS 1	·	3.1 km	MPC · JPL
516049	2015 TS_{137}	—	December 25, 2005	Kitt Peak	Spacewatch	EOS	1.8 km	MPC · JPL
516050	2015 TP_{138}	—	February 23, 2012	Mount Lemmon	Mount Lemmon Survey	·	2.6 km	MPC · JPL
516051	2015 TD_{139}	—	January 25, 2006	Kitt Peak	Spacewatch	·	3.0 km	MPC · JPL
516052	2015 TY_{149}	—	February 2, 2008	Kitt Peak	Spacewatch	·	2.2 km	MPC · JPL
516053	2015 TO_{151}	—	February 6, 2013	Kitt Peak	Spacewatch	·	1.8 km	MPC · JPL
516054	2015 TV_{154}	—	February 13, 2008	Kitt Peak	Spacewatch	KOR	1.1 km	MPC · JPL
516055	2015 TA_{157}	—	October 22, 2006	Mount Lemmon	Mount Lemmon Survey	HOF	2.3 km	MPC · JPL
516056	2015 TS_{172}	—	July 30, 2011	Siding Spring	SSS	·	1.2 km	MPC · JPL
516057	2015 TM_{176}	—	January 25, 2012	Haleakala	Pan-STARRS 1	NAE	2.6 km	MPC · JPL
516058	2015 TW_{182}	—	March 26, 2007	Mount Lemmon	Mount Lemmon Survey	·	3.2 km	MPC · JPL
516059	2015 TY_{182}	—	September 3, 2010	Mount Lemmon	Mount Lemmon Survey	EOS	1.8 km	MPC · JPL
516060	2015 TT_{188}	—	February 28, 2014	Haleakala	Pan-STARRS 1	·	1.3 km	MPC · JPL
516061	2015 TK_{194}	—	October 1, 2005	Catalina	CSS	·	3.2 km	MPC · JPL
516062	2015 TF_{196}	—	September 17, 2010	Mount Lemmon	Mount Lemmon Survey	·	2.0 km	MPC · JPL
516063	2015 TW_{197}	—	March 13, 2007	Mount Lemmon	Mount Lemmon Survey	EOS	1.9 km	MPC · JPL
516064	2015 TJ_{203}	—	April 13, 2013	Kitt Peak	Spacewatch	·	3.9 km	MPC · JPL
516065	2015 TC_{206}	—	December 26, 2005	Mount Lemmon	Mount Lemmon Survey	·	2.1 km	MPC · JPL
516066	2015 TK_{208}	—	November 12, 2010	Kitt Peak	Spacewatch	·	2.9 km	MPC · JPL
516067	2015 TX_{215}	—	August 28, 2006	Kitt Peak	Spacewatch	·	1.7 km	MPC · JPL
516068	2015 TS_{222}	—	February 5, 2006	Mount Lemmon	Mount Lemmon Survey	·	1.3 km	MPC · JPL
516069	2015 TE_{232}	—	July 19, 2007	Mount Lemmon	Mount Lemmon Survey	ULA · CYB	5.5 km	MPC · JPL
516070	2015 TD_{234}	—	August 8, 2004	Socorro	LINEAR	·	2.3 km	MPC · JPL
516071	2015 TH_{254}	—	March 16, 2013	Mount Lemmon	Mount Lemmon Survey	·	3.0 km	MPC · JPL
516072	2015 TZ_{258}	—	August 29, 2006	Catalina	CSS	·	1.9 km	MPC · JPL
516073	2015 TR_{282}	—	November 2, 2010	Mount Lemmon	Mount Lemmon Survey	EOS	1.7 km	MPC · JPL
516074	2015 TB_{283}	—	September 5, 2010	Mount Lemmon	Mount Lemmon Survey	·	2.6 km	MPC · JPL
516075	2015 TU_{294}	—	December 30, 2005	Kitt Peak	Spacewatch	·	2.9 km	MPC · JPL
516076	2015 TQ_{296}	—	March 12, 2007	Kitt Peak	Spacewatch	VER	2.6 km	MPC · JPL
516077	2015 TK_{303}	—	October 10, 2015	Kitt Peak	Spacewatch	HOF	2.3 km	MPC · JPL
516078	2015 TN_{303}	—	April 4, 2008	Kitt Peak	Spacewatch	EOS	2.0 km	MPC · JPL
516079	2015 TP_{303}	—	August 16, 1993	Kitt Peak	Spacewatch	EOS	1.8 km	MPC · JPL
516080	2015 TG_{319}	—	August 30, 2000	Kitt Peak	Spacewatch	KOR	1.3 km	MPC · JPL
516081	2015 TQ_{322}	—	October 8, 2005	Kitt Peak	Spacewatch	KOR	1.2 km	MPC · JPL
516082	2015 TP_{327}	—	February 19, 2012	Kitt Peak	Spacewatch	·	3.4 km	MPC · JPL
516083	2015 TW_{331}	—	December 31, 1999	Kitt Peak	Spacewatch	EOS	2.3 km	MPC · JPL
516084	2015 TZ_{333}	—	April 20, 2013	Mount Lemmon	Mount Lemmon Survey	·	3.2 km	MPC · JPL
516085	2015 TP_{344}	—	January 30, 2012	Mount Lemmon	Mount Lemmon Survey	·	2.7 km	MPC · JPL
516086	2015 TV_{345}	—	September 27, 2006	Kitt Peak	Spacewatch	·	1.5 km	MPC · JPL
516087	2015 TZ_{345}	—	March 15, 2007	Kitt Peak	Spacewatch	·	3.2 km	MPC · JPL
516088	2015 TF_{348}	—	November 18, 1998	Kitt Peak	Spacewatch	·	3.2 km	MPC · JPL
516089	2015 TO_{358}	—	April 11, 2008	Mount Lemmon	Mount Lemmon Survey	EOS	1.7 km	MPC · JPL
516090	2015 TF_{359}	—	October 23, 2011	Haleakala	Pan-STARRS 1	·	2.4 km	MPC · JPL
516091	2015 TP_{359}	—	October 17, 2010	Mount Lemmon	Mount Lemmon Survey	·	3.2 km	MPC · JPL
516092	2015 TY_{359}	—	March 13, 2007	Mount Lemmon	Mount Lemmon Survey	·	2.0 km	MPC · JPL
516093	2015 TN_{364}	—	August 3, 2014	Haleakala	Pan-STARRS 1	·	2.7 km	MPC · JPL
516094	2015 TP_{364}	—	April 25, 2007	Mount Lemmon	Mount Lemmon Survey	·	3.0 km	MPC · JPL
516095	2015 TT_{364}	—	April 11, 2007	Mount Lemmon	Mount Lemmon Survey	·	2.9 km	MPC · JPL
516096	2015 TW_{364}	—	March 14, 2007	Mount Lemmon	Mount Lemmon Survey	·	2.8 km	MPC · JPL
516097	2015 TG_{365}	—	March 14, 2007	Kitt Peak	Spacewatch	·	2.9 km	MPC · JPL
516098	2015 TK_{366}	—	April 10, 2013	Haleakala	Pan-STARRS 1	EOS	1.6 km	MPC · JPL
516099	2015 TS_{366}	—	November 17, 2009	Kitt Peak	Spacewatch	CYB	2.9 km	MPC · JPL
516100	2015 UQ	—	October 22, 2006	Kitt Peak	Spacewatch	·	1.8 km	MPC · JPL

== 516101–516200 ==
back to top

Designation			Discovery			Properties		Ref
Permanent	Provisional	Named after	Date	Site	Discoverer(s)	Category	Diam.	Ref
516101	2015 UM_{2}	—	August 20, 2009	Kitt Peak	Spacewatch	·	2.9 km	MPC · JPL
516102	2015 UT_{2}	—	August 27, 2009	Kitt Peak	Spacewatch	·	2.5 km	MPC · JPL
516103	2015 UT_{3}	—	October 18, 2011	Mount Lemmon	Mount Lemmon Survey	·	1.4 km	MPC · JPL
516104	2015 UJ_{6}	—	August 28, 2005	Kitt Peak	Spacewatch	·	1.9 km	MPC · JPL
516105	2015 UA_{12}	—	March 13, 2013	Kitt Peak	Spacewatch	EOS	1.4 km	MPC · JPL
516106	2015 UB_{13}	—	March 17, 2007	Kitt Peak	Spacewatch	·	2.4 km	MPC · JPL
516107	2015 UB_{14}	—	October 12, 2007	Kitt Peak	Spacewatch	·	790 m	MPC · JPL
516108	2015 UN_{15}	—	August 22, 2014	Haleakala	Pan-STARRS 1	·	2.3 km	MPC · JPL
516109	2015 UV_{15}	—	April 10, 2013	Haleakala	Pan-STARRS 1	·	2.6 km	MPC · JPL
516110	2015 UY_{17}	—	October 30, 2010	Mount Lemmon	Mount Lemmon Survey	·	2.6 km	MPC · JPL
516111	2015 UW_{22}	—	September 13, 2004	Kitt Peak	Spacewatch	·	2.1 km	MPC · JPL
516112	2015 UX_{30}	—	April 7, 2008	Kitt Peak	Spacewatch	·	2.1 km	MPC · JPL
516113	2015 UZ_{33}	—	November 11, 2010	Mount Lemmon	Mount Lemmon Survey	·	2.2 km	MPC · JPL
516114	2015 UF_{41}	—	September 5, 2007	Mount Lemmon	Mount Lemmon Survey	MAS	740 m	MPC · JPL
516115	2015 UE_{48}	—	May 15, 2013	Haleakala	Pan-STARRS 1	·	3.1 km	MPC · JPL
516116	2015 UH_{53}	—	January 25, 2006	Kitt Peak	Spacewatch	·	3.1 km	MPC · JPL
516117	2015 UD_{54}	—	October 25, 2005	Mount Lemmon	Mount Lemmon Survey	·	2.3 km	MPC · JPL
516118	2015 UY_{54}	—	January 31, 2006	Kitt Peak	Spacewatch	·	2.4 km	MPC · JPL
516119	2015 UC_{55}	—	August 18, 2009	Kitt Peak	Spacewatch	VER	2.5 km	MPC · JPL
516120	2015 UB_{56}	—	August 28, 2009	Catalina	CSS	·	3.2 km	MPC · JPL
516121	2015 UN_{56}	—	August 30, 2005	Kitt Peak	Spacewatch	KOR	1.1 km	MPC · JPL
516122	2015 UP_{58}	—	April 17, 2013	Haleakala	Pan-STARRS 1	·	2.3 km	MPC · JPL
516123	2015 UA_{59}	—	October 26, 2011	Haleakala	Pan-STARRS 1	·	1.6 km	MPC · JPL
516124	2015 UC_{59}	—	April 30, 2008	Mount Lemmon	Mount Lemmon Survey	EOS	1.8 km	MPC · JPL
516125	2015 UA_{60}	—	September 17, 2010	Mount Lemmon	Mount Lemmon Survey	·	2.0 km	MPC · JPL
516126	2015 UO_{62}	—	March 19, 2013	Haleakala	Pan-STARRS 1	·	2.4 km	MPC · JPL
516127	2015 UC_{73}	—	April 7, 2008	Kitt Peak	Spacewatch	·	2.7 km	MPC · JPL
516128	2015 UJ_{82}	—	September 12, 2015	Haleakala	Pan-STARRS 1	·	2.3 km	MPC · JPL
516129	2015 UM_{83}	—	April 10, 2013	Haleakala	Pan-STARRS 1	·	3.3 km	MPC · JPL
516130	2015 UQ_{86}	—	December 9, 2010	Kitt Peak	Spacewatch	EOS	1.9 km	MPC · JPL
516131	2015 VV_{6}	—	June 8, 2014	Haleakala	Pan-STARRS 1	·	2.5 km	MPC · JPL
516132	2015 VK_{39}	—	June 24, 2014	Haleakala	Pan-STARRS 1	·	2.4 km	MPC · JPL
516133	2015 VD_{72}	—	April 19, 2013	Haleakala	Pan-STARRS 1	·	3.4 km	MPC · JPL
516134	2015 VQ_{90}	—	March 12, 2007	Mount Lemmon	Mount Lemmon Survey	EOS	1.8 km	MPC · JPL
516135	2015 VD_{91}	—	March 16, 2013	Mount Lemmon	Mount Lemmon Survey	·	3.2 km	MPC · JPL
516136	2015 VU_{96}	—	January 22, 2012	Haleakala	Pan-STARRS 1	EOS	1.7 km	MPC · JPL
516137	2015 VX_{107}	—	October 18, 1998	Kitt Peak	Spacewatch	·	3.0 km	MPC · JPL
516138	2015 VJ_{111}	—	March 18, 2013	Kitt Peak	Spacewatch	·	1.9 km	MPC · JPL
516139	2015 VS_{116}	—	December 2, 2010	Kitt Peak	Spacewatch	·	3.1 km	MPC · JPL
516140	2015 VY_{125}	—	August 1, 2009	Kitt Peak	Spacewatch	TIR	3.6 km	MPC · JPL
516141	2015 VG_{143}	—	November 29, 2005	Kitt Peak	Spacewatch	EOS	1.9 km	MPC · JPL
516142	2015 WM_{15}	—	March 15, 2012	Kitt Peak	Spacewatch	·	2.4 km	MPC · JPL
516143	2015 WE_{18}	—	October 16, 2009	Mount Lemmon	Mount Lemmon Survey	·	2.6 km	MPC · JPL
516144	2015 XA_{29}	—	November 5, 2010	Mount Lemmon	Mount Lemmon Survey	·	3.2 km	MPC · JPL
516145	2015 XS_{38}	—	September 24, 2009	Kitt Peak	Spacewatch	·	2.1 km	MPC · JPL
516146	2015 XD_{41}	—	September 27, 2006	Mount Lemmon	Mount Lemmon Survey	·	1.4 km	MPC · JPL
516147	2015 XK_{41}	—	May 17, 2013	Mount Lemmon	Mount Lemmon Survey	·	2.8 km	MPC · JPL
516148	2015 XW_{89}	—	September 16, 2009	Catalina	CSS	·	3.8 km	MPC · JPL
516149	2015 XM_{115}	—	January 10, 2006	Mount Lemmon	Mount Lemmon Survey	·	3.2 km	MPC · JPL
516150	2015 XB_{174}	—	September 18, 2003	Kitt Peak	Spacewatch	·	2.9 km	MPC · JPL
516151	2015 XC_{350}	—	October 28, 2005	Mount Lemmon	Mount Lemmon Survey	·	2.3 km	MPC · JPL
516152	2015 XE_{386}	—	October 25, 2014	Haleakala	Pan-STARRS 1	L5	10 km	MPC · JPL
516153	2015 XN_{396}	—	April 15, 2013	Haleakala	Pan-STARRS 1	·	2.6 km	MPC · JPL
516154	2016 CL_{32}	—	February 6, 2016	Catalina	CSS	APO · PHA	480 m	MPC · JPL
516155	2016 DP	—	February 18, 2016	Mount Lemmon	Mount Lemmon Survey	APO · PHA	340 m	MPC · JPL
516156	2016 FP_{29}	—	September 24, 2008	Mount Lemmon	Mount Lemmon Survey	·	2.1 km	MPC · JPL
516157	2016 LT_{8}	—	April 5, 2008	Mount Lemmon	Mount Lemmon Survey	H	400 m	MPC · JPL
516158	2016 LN_{9}	—	March 8, 2013	Haleakala	Pan-STARRS 1	H	440 m	MPC · JPL
516159	2016 LP_{9}	—	January 6, 2010	Mount Lemmon	Mount Lemmon Survey	H	380 m	MPC · JPL
516160	2016 LQ_{9}	—	August 30, 2014	Catalina	CSS	H	380 m	MPC · JPL
516161	2016 LH_{53}	—	August 27, 2011	Haleakala	Pan-STARRS 1	H	400 m	MPC · JPL
516162	2016 NL_{47}	—	September 15, 1998	Kitt Peak	Spacewatch	·	820 m	MPC · JPL
516163	2016 NP_{48}	—	July 31, 2005	Palomar	NEAT	TIR	2.8 km	MPC · JPL
516164	2016 NC_{58}	—	September 28, 2011	Mount Lemmon	Mount Lemmon Survey	H	400 m	MPC · JPL
516165	2016 NF_{71}	—	May 21, 2011	Mount Lemmon	Mount Lemmon Survey	·	1.4 km	MPC · JPL
516166	2016 NT_{71}	—	October 10, 2012	Haleakala	Pan-STARRS 1	·	1.7 km	MPC · JPL
516167	2016 PW_{21}	—	October 16, 2009	Catalina	CSS	·	940 m	MPC · JPL
516168	2016 PP_{75}	—	August 14, 2012	Haleakala	Pan-STARRS 1	·	1.3 km	MPC · JPL
516169	2016 PM_{77}	—	October 21, 1995	Ondřejov	L. Kotková, P. Pravec	H	560 m	MPC · JPL
516170	2016 PH_{79}	—	September 12, 2005	Kitt Peak	Spacewatch	H	610 m	MPC · JPL
516171	2016 PJ_{79}	—	January 15, 2015	Haleakala	Pan-STARRS 1	H	430 m	MPC · JPL
516172	2016 PO_{79}	—	September 25, 2005	Kitt Peak	Spacewatch	H	460 m	MPC · JPL
516173	2016 PA_{80}	—	February 9, 2007	Kitt Peak	Spacewatch	H	510 m	MPC · JPL
516174	2016 PY_{82}	—	August 2, 2016	Haleakala	Pan-STARRS 1	·	930 m	MPC · JPL
516175	2016 PP_{87}	—	July 27, 2011	Haleakala	Pan-STARRS 1	EUN	1.1 km	MPC · JPL
516176	2016 PW_{87}	—	November 19, 1995	Kitt Peak	Spacewatch	(5)	1.1 km	MPC · JPL
516177	2016 PQ_{93}	—	January 19, 2012	Haleakala	Pan-STARRS 1	·	2.3 km	MPC · JPL
516178	2016 PU_{94}	—	August 28, 2016	Mount Lemmon	Mount Lemmon Survey	JUN	830 m	MPC · JPL
516179	2016 PG_{98}	—	October 13, 2012	Nogales	M. Schwartz, P. R. Holvorcem	·	1.6 km	MPC · JPL
516180	2016 QC_{46}	—	August 28, 2005	Kitt Peak	Spacewatch	·	1.1 km	MPC · JPL
516181	2016 QQ_{49}	—	August 26, 2005	Anderson Mesa	LONEOS	H	530 m	MPC · JPL
516182	2016 QN_{78}	—	June 17, 2009	Mount Lemmon	Mount Lemmon Survey	PHO	1.0 km	MPC · JPL
516183	2016 QX_{84}	—	August 28, 2009	La Sagra	OAM	·	690 m	MPC · JPL
516184	2016 QF_{88}	—	October 23, 2011	Haleakala	Pan-STARRS 1	EOS	1.5 km	MPC · JPL
516185	2016 RL_{1}	—	January 16, 2004	Kitt Peak	Spacewatch	·	2.2 km	MPC · JPL
516186	2016 RQ_{16}	—	January 28, 2007	Mount Lemmon	Mount Lemmon Survey	·	1.1 km	MPC · JPL
516187	2016 RO_{29}	—	September 27, 2006	Kitt Peak	Spacewatch	·	660 m	MPC · JPL
516188	2016 RA_{38}	—	October 25, 2003	Kitt Peak	Spacewatch	·	660 m	MPC · JPL
516189	2016 RJ_{42}	—	May 9, 2013	Kitt Peak	Spacewatch	H	370 m	MPC · JPL
516190	2016 RK_{42}	—	September 28, 2008	Catalina	CSS	H	490 m	MPC · JPL
516191	2016 RG_{45}	—	November 7, 2008	Mount Lemmon	Mount Lemmon Survey	·	1.2 km	MPC · JPL
516192	2016 RD_{46}	—	November 16, 1998	Kitt Peak	Spacewatch	·	1.3 km	MPC · JPL
516193	2016 SR_{11}	—	April 9, 2002	Kitt Peak	Spacewatch	·	710 m	MPC · JPL
516194	2016 SO_{12}	—	December 31, 2008	Mount Lemmon	Mount Lemmon Survey	(5)	1.1 km	MPC · JPL
516195	2016 SF_{16}	—	August 30, 2013	Haleakala	Pan-STARRS 1	H	520 m	MPC · JPL
516196	2016 SJ_{24}	—	September 26, 2005	Kitt Peak	Spacewatch	·	2.3 km	MPC · JPL
516197	2016 ST_{25}	—	February 11, 2004	Kitt Peak	Spacewatch	V	590 m	MPC · JPL
516198	2016 SQ_{34}	—	September 19, 2003	Campo Imperatore	CINEOS	·	750 m	MPC · JPL
516199	2016 SV_{35}	—	November 1, 2000	Socorro	LINEAR	·	2.3 km	MPC · JPL
516200	2016 SM_{36}	—	October 6, 2008	Mount Lemmon	Mount Lemmon Survey	·	1.1 km	MPC · JPL

== 516201–516300 ==
back to top

Designation			Discovery			Properties		Ref
Permanent	Provisional	Named after	Date	Site	Discoverer(s)	Category	Diam.	Ref
516201	2016 SX_{36}	—	November 27, 1995	Kitt Peak	Spacewatch	·	1.4 km	MPC · JPL
516202	2016 SK_{38}	—	December 5, 2005	Kitt Peak	Spacewatch	MAS	700 m	MPC · JPL
516203	2016 SF_{45}	—	July 28, 2009	Catalina	CSS	·	710 m	MPC · JPL
516204	2016 SO_{49}	—	October 21, 2003	Kitt Peak	Spacewatch	·	1.4 km	MPC · JPL
516205	2016 TC_{8}	—	December 27, 2006	Mount Lemmon	Mount Lemmon Survey	·	920 m	MPC · JPL
516206	2016 TO_{8}	—	September 20, 2011	Catalina	CSS	·	2.0 km	MPC · JPL
516207	2016 TQ_{9}	—	November 18, 1998	Kitt Peak	Spacewatch	H	530 m	MPC · JPL
516208	2016 TX_{24}	—	October 12, 2005	Kitt Peak	Spacewatch	EOS	1.7 km	MPC · JPL
516209	2016 TZ_{29}	—	December 18, 2001	Socorro	LINEAR	·	1.9 km	MPC · JPL
516210	2016 TM_{31}	—	October 23, 2006	Kitt Peak	Spacewatch	·	650 m	MPC · JPL
516211	2016 TX_{43}	—	September 27, 2003	Kitt Peak	Spacewatch	·	580 m	MPC · JPL
516212	2016 TF_{48}	—	April 11, 2010	Kitt Peak	Spacewatch	·	2.4 km	MPC · JPL
516213	2016 TO_{56}	—	December 28, 2011	Catalina	CSS	·	2.3 km	MPC · JPL
516214	2016 TB_{61}	—	October 17, 2012	Mount Lemmon	Mount Lemmon Survey	·	1.3 km	MPC · JPL
516215	2016 TT_{72}	—	August 30, 2005	Kitt Peak	Spacewatch	·	2.3 km	MPC · JPL
516216	2016 TN_{74}	—	October 17, 1995	Kitt Peak	Spacewatch	(2076)	820 m	MPC · JPL
516217	2016 TT_{83}	—	October 19, 2012	Catalina	CSS	·	1.3 km	MPC · JPL
516218	2016 TZ_{85}	—	October 30, 2007	Kitt Peak	Spacewatch	·	1.7 km	MPC · JPL
516219	2016 TP_{96}	—	December 10, 2012	Haleakala	Pan-STARRS 1	·	1.4 km	MPC · JPL
516220	2016 TQ_{96}	—	November 21, 2005	Catalina	CSS	·	3.7 km	MPC · JPL
516221	2016 TA_{97}	—	February 8, 2008	Mount Lemmon	Mount Lemmon Survey	EOS	1.7 km	MPC · JPL
516222	2016 UR_{3}	—	October 2, 2006	Mount Lemmon	Mount Lemmon Survey	·	600 m	MPC · JPL
516223	2016 UU_{3}	—	October 18, 2003	Kitt Peak	Spacewatch	EUN	920 m	MPC · JPL
516224	2016 UZ_{3}	—	February 25, 2014	Kitt Peak	Spacewatch	·	1.2 km	MPC · JPL
516225	2016 UZ_{13}	—	December 30, 2007	Mount Lemmon	Mount Lemmon Survey	·	2.1 km	MPC · JPL
516226	2016 UL_{14}	—	November 19, 2003	Kitt Peak	Spacewatch	·	1.2 km	MPC · JPL
516227	2016 UL_{17}	—	November 9, 2007	Mount Lemmon	Mount Lemmon Survey	·	1.6 km	MPC · JPL
516228	2016 UF_{24}	—	October 22, 2008	Kitt Peak	Spacewatch	·	980 m	MPC · JPL
516229	2016 UG_{24}	—	September 19, 2006	Kitt Peak	Spacewatch	·	680 m	MPC · JPL
516230	2016 UX_{26}	—	November 23, 2006	Mount Lemmon	Mount Lemmon Survey	·	830 m	MPC · JPL
516231	2016 UE_{30}	—	September 13, 2007	Mount Lemmon	Mount Lemmon Survey	·	1.3 km	MPC · JPL
516232	2016 UU_{33}	—	June 12, 2015	Mount Lemmon	Mount Lemmon Survey	·	2.2 km	MPC · JPL
516233	2016 UC_{34}	—	August 29, 2016	Mount Lemmon	Mount Lemmon Survey	EOS	1.8 km	MPC · JPL
516234	2016 UW_{34}	—	November 16, 2011	Mount Lemmon	Mount Lemmon Survey	·	1.7 km	MPC · JPL
516235	2016 UH_{37}	—	November 30, 2003	Kitt Peak	Spacewatch	·	1.4 km	MPC · JPL
516236	2016 UO_{39}	—	January 7, 2006	Kitt Peak	Spacewatch	·	1.0 km	MPC · JPL
516237	2016 UF_{41}	—	September 25, 2000	Socorro	LINEAR	·	950 m	MPC · JPL
516238	2016 UA_{43}	—	March 16, 2007	Kitt Peak	Spacewatch	·	3.0 km	MPC · JPL
516239	2016 UO_{60}	—	May 3, 2008	Mount Lemmon	Mount Lemmon Survey	·	2.9 km	MPC · JPL
516240	2016 UX_{64}	—	December 19, 2000	Kitt Peak	Spacewatch	·	970 m	MPC · JPL
516241	2016 US_{66}	—	December 14, 2013	Haleakala	Pan-STARRS 1	·	880 m	MPC · JPL
516242	2016 UM_{72}	—	October 22, 1995	Kitt Peak	Spacewatch	·	1.1 km	MPC · JPL
516243	2016 UN_{74}	—	February 28, 2014	Haleakala	Pan-STARRS 1	·	1.8 km	MPC · JPL
516244	2016 UH_{77}	—	April 5, 2014	Haleakala	Pan-STARRS 1	·	1.4 km	MPC · JPL
516245	2016 UL_{80}	—	August 29, 2005	Kitt Peak	Spacewatch	·	2.6 km	MPC · JPL
516246	2016 UA_{82}	—	March 25, 2014	Kitt Peak	Spacewatch	·	1.7 km	MPC · JPL
516247	2016 UQ_{86}	—	March 10, 2007	Mount Lemmon	Mount Lemmon Survey	·	920 m	MPC · JPL
516248	2016 UG_{87}	—	September 22, 2003	Kitt Peak	Spacewatch	·	1.3 km	MPC · JPL
516249	2016 UF_{88}	—	March 16, 2004	Kitt Peak	Spacewatch	·	710 m	MPC · JPL
516250	2016 UQ_{93}	—	October 23, 2003	Kitt Peak	Spacewatch	·	1.3 km	MPC · JPL
516251	2016 UF_{95}	—	October 15, 2007	Mount Lemmon	Mount Lemmon Survey	·	1.3 km	MPC · JPL
516252	2016 UY_{104}	—	September 15, 2006	Kitt Peak	Spacewatch	·	1.3 km	MPC · JPL
516253	2016 UG_{105}	—	October 22, 2012	Haleakala	Pan-STARRS 1	fast	1.0 km	MPC · JPL
516254	2016 UC_{108}	—	September 5, 1999	Kitt Peak	Spacewatch	·	1.2 km	MPC · JPL
516255	2016 UB_{124}	—	January 6, 2010	Kitt Peak	Spacewatch	V	670 m	MPC · JPL
516256	2016 UN_{135}	—	April 27, 2012	Haleakala	Pan-STARRS 1	·	720 m	MPC · JPL
516257	2016 UF_{144}	—	February 1, 2005	Kitt Peak	Spacewatch	·	710 m	MPC · JPL
516258	2016 UL_{146}	—	October 14, 2007	Catalina	CSS	·	2.1 km	MPC · JPL
516259	2016 UH_{148}	—	May 29, 2009	Mount Lemmon	Mount Lemmon Survey	HYG	2.7 km	MPC · JPL
516260	2016 UJ_{148}	—	April 4, 2014	Haleakala	Pan-STARRS 1	EUN	1.2 km	MPC · JPL
516261	2016 UM_{148}	—	August 11, 2007	Anderson Mesa	LONEOS	MAR	1.1 km	MPC · JPL
516262	2016 UN_{148}	—	March 14, 2010	Catalina	CSS	·	2.2 km	MPC · JPL
516263	2016 UO_{148}	—	April 30, 2014	Haleakala	Pan-STARRS 1	EUN	1.1 km	MPC · JPL
516264	2016 VC	—	October 17, 2006	Catalina	CSS	·	840 m	MPC · JPL
516265	2016 VU_{6}	—	November 26, 2005	Kitt Peak	Spacewatch	V	770 m	MPC · JPL
516266	2016 VZ_{9}	—	October 24, 2005	Kitt Peak	Spacewatch	PHO	860 m	MPC · JPL
516267	2016 VG_{13}	—	September 19, 2006	Kitt Peak	Spacewatch	KOR	1.2 km	MPC · JPL
516268	2016 VN_{13}	—	September 24, 2011	Haleakala	Pan-STARRS 1	·	1.6 km	MPC · JPL
516269	2016 VM_{15}	—	February 20, 2014	Mount Lemmon	Mount Lemmon Survey	EUN	1.3 km	MPC · JPL
516270	2016 VP_{18}	—	October 27, 2012	Mount Lemmon	Mount Lemmon Survey	·	1.3 km	MPC · JPL
516271	2016 VL_{19}	—	January 5, 2013	Mount Lemmon	Mount Lemmon Survey	·	1.0 km	MPC · JPL
516272	2016 WW_{5}	—	June 11, 2010	WISE	WISE	·	4.1 km	MPC · JPL
516273	2016 WO_{12}	—	October 23, 2003	Kitt Peak	Spacewatch	MIS	2.0 km	MPC · JPL
516274	2016 WX_{13}	—	March 10, 2007	Kitt Peak	Spacewatch	·	830 m	MPC · JPL
516275	2016 WP_{15}	—	March 12, 2014	Haleakala	Pan-STARRS 1	·	1.6 km	MPC · JPL
516276	2016 WY_{16}	—	March 27, 2011	Mount Lemmon	Mount Lemmon Survey	·	1.0 km	MPC · JPL
516277	2016 WK_{17}	—	February 21, 2007	Kitt Peak	Spacewatch	·	1.1 km	MPC · JPL
516278	2016 WQ_{18}	—	October 26, 2011	Haleakala	Pan-STARRS 1	·	1.5 km	MPC · JPL
516279	2016 WA_{19}	—	October 2, 2008	Catalina	CSS	·	1.3 km	MPC · JPL
516280	2016 WK_{22}	—	March 4, 2013	Haleakala	Pan-STARRS 1	·	2.3 km	MPC · JPL
516281	2016 WC_{25}	—	September 30, 2006	Mount Lemmon	Mount Lemmon Survey	KOR	1.1 km	MPC · JPL
516282	2016 WY_{25}	—	October 4, 2005	Mount Lemmon	Mount Lemmon Survey	·	1.1 km	MPC · JPL
516283	2016 WL_{27}	—	October 2, 2010	Kitt Peak	Spacewatch	·	2.0 km	MPC · JPL
516284	2016 WS_{27}	—	December 13, 2004	Kitt Peak	Spacewatch	·	1.2 km	MPC · JPL
516285	2016 WA_{29}	—	May 2, 2014	Kitt Peak	Spacewatch	·	1.9 km	MPC · JPL
516286	2016 WD_{30}	—	January 18, 2012	Mount Lemmon	Mount Lemmon Survey	·	1.8 km	MPC · JPL
516287	2016 WR_{30}	—	April 5, 2014	Haleakala	Pan-STARRS 1	MAR	870 m	MPC · JPL
516288	2016 WL_{36}	—	May 7, 2014	Haleakala	Pan-STARRS 1	·	1.1 km	MPC · JPL
516289	2016 WG_{37}	—	April 20, 2006	Kitt Peak	Spacewatch	·	2.7 km	MPC · JPL
516290	2016 WM_{38}	—	September 11, 2010	Mount Lemmon	Mount Lemmon Survey	·	2.7 km	MPC · JPL
516291	2016 WE_{40}	—	November 17, 1998	Kitt Peak	Spacewatch	NEM	2.0 km	MPC · JPL
516292	2016 WZ_{42}	—	November 18, 2006	Mount Lemmon	Mount Lemmon Survey	·	2.3 km	MPC · JPL
516293	2016 WE_{46}	—	November 18, 2003	Kitt Peak	Spacewatch	·	610 m	MPC · JPL
516294	2016 WY_{47}	—	September 11, 2007	Mount Lemmon	Mount Lemmon Survey	·	1.3 km	MPC · JPL
516295	2016 WY_{51}	—	December 13, 2004	Kitt Peak	Spacewatch	·	1.4 km	MPC · JPL
516296	2016 WK_{52}	—	June 3, 1995	Kitt Peak	Spacewatch	(5)	1.6 km	MPC · JPL
516297	2016 WC_{53}	—	October 14, 1995	Xinglong	SCAP	·	1.4 km	MPC · JPL
516298	2016 WP_{53}	—	May 11, 2010	Mount Lemmon	Mount Lemmon Survey	·	1.9 km	MPC · JPL
516299	2016 WO_{54}	—	December 3, 2007	Kitt Peak	Spacewatch	·	2.2 km	MPC · JPL
516300	2016 XD_{4}	—	May 27, 2010	WISE	WISE	·	4.0 km	MPC · JPL

== 516301–516400 ==
back to top

Designation			Discovery			Properties		Ref
Permanent	Provisional	Named after	Date	Site	Discoverer(s)	Category	Diam.	Ref
516301	2016 XL_{6}	—	April 13, 2013	Haleakala	Pan-STARRS 1	·	2.2 km	MPC · JPL
516302	2016 XQ_{6}	—	May 14, 2010	WISE	WISE	·	3.9 km	MPC · JPL
516303	2016 XQ_{10}	—	February 28, 2008	Kitt Peak	Spacewatch	·	1.7 km	MPC · JPL
516304	2016 XV_{10}	—	April 10, 2013	Haleakala	Pan-STARRS 1	·	1.6 km	MPC · JPL
516305	2016 XK_{11}	—	August 11, 2015	Haleakala	Pan-STARRS 1	·	2.2 km	MPC · JPL
516306	2016 XB_{15}	—	November 6, 2007	Kitt Peak	Spacewatch	·	1.7 km	MPC · JPL
516307	2016 XQ_{16}	—	June 1, 2008	Mount Lemmon	Mount Lemmon Survey	·	1.4 km	MPC · JPL
516308	2016 XH_{21}	—	September 22, 2003	Kitt Peak	Spacewatch	·	810 m	MPC · JPL
516309	2016 YO_{4}	—	October 10, 2016	Mount Lemmon	Mount Lemmon Survey	·	1.4 km	MPC · JPL
516310	2016 YT_{4}	—	September 17, 1995	Kitt Peak	Spacewatch	·	1.2 km	MPC · JPL
516311	2016 YC_{7}	—	November 3, 2005	Kitt Peak	Spacewatch	EOS	1.8 km	MPC · JPL
516312	2016 YF_{7}	—	January 1, 2009	Mount Lemmon	Mount Lemmon Survey	·	1.3 km	MPC · JPL
516313	2016 YV_{9}	—	January 28, 2007	Mount Lemmon	Mount Lemmon Survey	·	2.6 km	MPC · JPL
516314	2016 YE_{10}	—	December 27, 2009	Kitt Peak	Spacewatch	CYB	5.3 km	MPC · JPL
516315	2016 YR_{11}	—	October 29, 2008	Kitt Peak	Spacewatch	3:2	3.7 km	MPC · JPL
516316	2016 YC_{12}	—	March 17, 2012	Mount Lemmon	Mount Lemmon Survey	·	3.3 km	MPC · JPL
516317	2016 YP_{13}	—	September 23, 2009	Kitt Peak	Spacewatch	ELF	3.5 km	MPC · JPL
516318	2017 AX_{5}	—	December 10, 2006	Kitt Peak	Spacewatch	(16286)	2.0 km	MPC · JPL
516319	2017 AA_{7}	—	December 4, 2007	Kitt Peak	Spacewatch	·	2.0 km	MPC · JPL
516320	2017 AP_{12}	—	December 1, 2005	Kitt Peak	Spacewatch	·	2.4 km	MPC · JPL
516321	2017 AU_{12}	—	June 30, 2014	Haleakala	Pan-STARRS 1	GEF	1.5 km	MPC · JPL
516322	2017 AT_{14}	—	January 28, 2006	Mount Lemmon	Mount Lemmon Survey	·	3.2 km	MPC · JPL
516323	2017 AJ_{20}	—	February 20, 2012	Haleakala	Pan-STARRS 1	·	3.4 km	MPC · JPL
516324	2017 AZ_{21}	—	May 29, 2003	Kitt Peak	Spacewatch	·	2.7 km	MPC · JPL
516325	2017 BR_{4}	—	February 7, 2013	Catalina	CSS	·	1.9 km	MPC · JPL
516326	2017 BF_{10}	—	February 16, 2012	Haleakala	Pan-STARRS 1	·	2.4 km	MPC · JPL
516327	2017 BM_{13}	—	October 3, 2006	Mount Lemmon	Mount Lemmon Survey	·	2.0 km	MPC · JPL
516328	2017 BU_{15}	—	February 13, 2007	Mount Lemmon	Mount Lemmon Survey	·	1.5 km	MPC · JPL
516329	2017 BY_{15}	—	September 30, 2003	Kitt Peak	Spacewatch	·	4.8 km	MPC · JPL
516330	2017 BC_{19}	—	January 7, 2006	Kitt Peak	Spacewatch	·	2.1 km	MPC · JPL
516331	2017 BP_{20}	—	August 29, 2009	Kitt Peak	Spacewatch	·	2.5 km	MPC · JPL
516332	2017 BZ_{32}	—	March 12, 2007	Mount Lemmon	Mount Lemmon Survey	(159)	2.6 km	MPC · JPL
516333	2017 BP_{33}	—	January 28, 2000	Kitt Peak	Spacewatch	·	2.6 km	MPC · JPL
516334	2017 BS_{41}	—	January 26, 2006	Mount Lemmon	Mount Lemmon Survey	VER	2.7 km	MPC · JPL
516335	2017 BD_{44}	—	February 25, 2006	Kitt Peak	Spacewatch	·	3.2 km	MPC · JPL
516336	2017 BZ_{45}	—	April 6, 2008	Mount Lemmon	Mount Lemmon Survey	·	2.0 km	MPC · JPL
516337	2017 BV_{51}	—	December 13, 2010	Mount Lemmon	Mount Lemmon Survey	·	2.5 km	MPC · JPL
516338	2017 BO_{52}	—	October 7, 2004	Kitt Peak	Spacewatch	·	2.5 km	MPC · JPL
516339	2017 BL_{63}	—	June 30, 2014	Haleakala	Pan-STARRS 1	·	2.3 km	MPC · JPL
516340	2017 BH_{64}	—	October 16, 2006	Catalina	CSS	·	2.4 km	MPC · JPL
516341	2017 BZ_{64}	—	July 23, 2010	WISE	WISE	NAE	3.8 km	MPC · JPL
516342	2017 BZ_{84}	—	February 27, 2012	Haleakala	Pan-STARRS 1	·	2.5 km	MPC · JPL
516343	2017 BH_{86}	—	June 25, 2011	Mount Lemmon	Mount Lemmon Survey	L5	8.7 km	MPC · JPL
516344	2017 BL_{87}	—	March 27, 2012	Catalina	CSS	·	3.5 km	MPC · JPL
516345	2017 BW_{87}	—	November 20, 2004	Kitt Peak	Spacewatch	·	2.9 km	MPC · JPL
516346	2017 BS_{90}	—	November 23, 2011	Kitt Peak	Spacewatch	·	2.0 km	MPC · JPL
516347	2017 BB_{92}	—	May 2, 2010	WISE	WISE	L5	10 km	MPC · JPL
516348	2017 BK_{94}	—	October 9, 2010	Mount Lemmon	Mount Lemmon Survey	KOR	1.2 km	MPC · JPL
516349	2017 BO_{99}	—	January 28, 2007	Mount Lemmon	Mount Lemmon Survey	·	1.5 km	MPC · JPL
516350	2017 BQ_{99}	—	July 5, 2005	Kitt Peak	Spacewatch	·	2.2 km	MPC · JPL
516351	2017 BV_{99}	—	November 7, 2008	Mount Lemmon	Mount Lemmon Survey	·	1.7 km	MPC · JPL
516352	2017 BA_{105}	—	March 15, 2007	Mount Lemmon	Mount Lemmon Survey	·	3.0 km	MPC · JPL
516353	2017 BG_{106}	—	November 6, 2005	Kitt Peak	Spacewatch	EOS	1.8 km	MPC · JPL
516354	2017 BJ_{112}	—	October 18, 2014	Mount Lemmon	Mount Lemmon Survey	L5	7.8 km	MPC · JPL
516355	2017 BD_{114}	—	October 23, 2004	Kitt Peak	Spacewatch	·	3.2 km	MPC · JPL
516356	2017 BR_{123}	—	November 25, 2010	Mount Lemmon	Mount Lemmon Survey	·	2.8 km	MPC · JPL
516357	2017 BD_{127}	—	December 28, 2005	Kitt Peak	Spacewatch	·	2.9 km	MPC · JPL
516358	2017 BE_{127}	—	March 26, 2007	Mount Lemmon	Mount Lemmon Survey	·	2.2 km	MPC · JPL
516359	2017 BY_{127}	—	November 6, 2005	Mount Lemmon	Mount Lemmon Survey	·	1.9 km	MPC · JPL
516360	2017 BK_{131}	—	March 19, 2009	Kitt Peak	Spacewatch	·	1.6 km	MPC · JPL
516361	2017 CG_{2}	—	January 31, 2006	Kitt Peak	Spacewatch	·	2.9 km	MPC · JPL
516362	2017 CS_{4}	—	September 17, 2003	Kitt Peak	Spacewatch	·	3.6 km	MPC · JPL
516363	2017 CV_{5}	—	November 26, 2005	Mount Lemmon	Mount Lemmon Survey	·	1.9 km	MPC · JPL
516364	2017 CX_{30}	—	July 10, 2005	Kitt Peak	Spacewatch	·	2.6 km	MPC · JPL
516365	2017 CG_{34}	—	March 14, 2007	Mount Lemmon	Mount Lemmon Survey	·	3.8 km	MPC · JPL
516366	2017 DP_{29}	—	March 12, 2007	Mount Lemmon	Mount Lemmon Survey	EOS	1.9 km	MPC · JPL
516367	2017 DQ_{47}	—	February 25, 2012	Kitt Peak	Spacewatch	·	2.8 km	MPC · JPL
516368	2017 DY_{52}	—	January 26, 2006	Mount Lemmon	Mount Lemmon Survey	·	2.8 km	MPC · JPL
516369	2017 DQ_{88}	—	December 12, 1998	Kitt Peak	Spacewatch	·	4.4 km	MPC · JPL
516370	2017 DE_{112}	—	October 4, 1999	Kitt Peak	Spacewatch	·	3.0 km	MPC · JPL
516371	2017 DG_{116}	—	April 22, 2010	WISE	WISE	L5	11 km	MPC · JPL
516372	2017 EK_{5}	—	November 10, 2009	Kitt Peak	Spacewatch	·	4.3 km	MPC · JPL
516373	2017 FA_{42}	—	February 21, 2007	Mount Lemmon	Mount Lemmon Survey	·	520 m	MPC · JPL
516374	2017 FQ_{67}	—	May 13, 2007	Mount Lemmon	Mount Lemmon Survey	EOS	2.3 km	MPC · JPL
516375	2017 FR_{100}	—	February 24, 2006	Kitt Peak	Spacewatch	L5	9.5 km	MPC · JPL
516376	2017 FD_{104}	—	December 12, 2004	Kitt Peak	Spacewatch	·	1.4 km	MPC · JPL
516377	2017 HQ_{11}	—	November 26, 2009	Mount Lemmon	Mount Lemmon Survey	·	3.4 km	MPC · JPL
516378	2017 RT_{3}	—	August 29, 2006	Kitt Peak	Spacewatch	·	1.4 km	MPC · JPL
516379	2017 SN_{34}	—	June 23, 2000	Kitt Peak	Spacewatch	EUN	1.4 km	MPC · JPL
516380	2017 WG_{26}	—	August 5, 2008	Siding Spring	SSS	EUN	1.4 km	MPC · JPL
516381	2018 CY_{7}	—	November 1, 2006	Mount Lemmon	Mount Lemmon Survey	·	4.7 km	MPC · JPL
516382	2018 CK_{8}	—	December 21, 2005	Catalina	CSS	·	3.7 km	MPC · JPL
516383	2018 CO_{9}	—	January 22, 2004	Socorro	LINEAR	·	2.1 km	MPC · JPL
516384	2018 CS_{9}	—	February 16, 2001	Socorro	LINEAR	·	2.9 km	MPC · JPL
516385	2018 CX_{11}	—	January 26, 2007	Kitt Peak	Spacewatch	MAS	860 m	MPC · JPL
516386	2018 DX	—	December 14, 2004	Kitt Peak	Spacewatch	L5	10 km	MPC · JPL
516387	1995 UL_{66}	—	October 17, 1995	Kitt Peak	Spacewatch	EUN	1.7 km	MPC · JPL
516388	1996 AG_{15}	—	January 12, 1996	Kitt Peak	Spacewatch	·	1.6 km	MPC · JPL
516389	1996 BX_{11}	—	January 16, 1996	Kitt Peak	Spacewatch	·	2.1 km	MPC · JPL
516390	1996 TZ_{46}	—	October 11, 1996	Kitt Peak	Spacewatch	·	1.8 km	MPC · JPL
516391	1997 LG_{5}	—	June 1, 1997	Kitt Peak	Spacewatch	·	2.2 km	MPC · JPL
516392	1999 VH_{136}	—	November 9, 1999	Socorro	LINEAR	H	450 m	MPC · JPL
516393	2000 AB_{22}	—	January 3, 2000	Socorro	LINEAR	TIR	3.5 km	MPC · JPL
516394	2000 BT_{9}	—	January 26, 2000	Kitt Peak	Spacewatch	·	1.6 km	MPC · JPL
516395	2000 CS_{150}	—	February 4, 2000	Kitt Peak	Spacewatch	·	1.6 km	MPC · JPL
516396	2000 WY_{28}	—	November 25, 2000	Socorro	LINEAR	AMO	260 m	MPC · JPL
516397	2001 FK_{126}	—	March 29, 2001	Kitt Peak	Spacewatch	·	1.2 km	MPC · JPL
516398	2001 HW_{15}	—	April 24, 2001	Anderson Mesa	LONEOS	AMO	300 m	MPC · JPL
516399	2001 QH_{55}	—	August 16, 2001	Socorro	LINEAR	PHO	780 m	MPC · JPL
516400	2001 SM_{222}	—	September 19, 2001	Socorro	LINEAR	·	690 m	MPC · JPL

== 516401–516500 ==
back to top

Designation			Discovery			Properties		Ref
Permanent	Provisional	Named after	Date	Site	Discoverer(s)	Category	Diam.	Ref
516401	2001 SN_{284}	—	September 22, 2001	Kitt Peak	Spacewatch	·	1.1 km	MPC · JPL
516402	2001 TJ_{129}	—	October 15, 2001	Kitt Peak	Spacewatch	H	400 m	MPC · JPL
516403	2001 UR_{19}	—	October 17, 2001	Kitt Peak	Spacewatch	H	430 m	MPC · JPL
516404	2001 US_{229}	—	October 16, 2001	Palomar	NEAT	·	730 m	MPC · JPL
516405	2002 AC_{33}	—	January 6, 2002	Kitt Peak	Spacewatch	·	840 m	MPC · JPL
516406	2002 CZ_{44}	—	February 8, 2002	Kitt Peak	Spacewatch	H	470 m	MPC · JPL
516407	2002 GM_{53}	—	April 5, 2002	Palomar	NEAT	·	2.1 km	MPC · JPL
516408	2002 GB_{192}	—	April 4, 2002	Kitt Peak	Spacewatch	3:2 · SHU	5.6 km	MPC · JPL
516409	2002 JG_{93}	—	May 11, 2002	Socorro	LINEAR	·	1.0 km	MPC · JPL
516410	2002 MY_{3}	—	May 17, 2002	Socorro	LINEAR	T_{j} (2.98)	3.2 km	MPC · JPL
516411	2002 OZ_{37}	—	September 12, 1994	Kitt Peak	Spacewatch	·	1.3 km	MPC · JPL
516412	2002 PM_{138}	—	August 3, 2002	Campo Imperatore	CINEOS	·	1.1 km	MPC · JPL
516413	2002 QK_{52}	—	August 29, 2002	Palomar	S. F. Hönig	·	530 m	MPC · JPL
516414	2002 RF_{244}	—	September 1, 2002	Palomar	NEAT	·	630 m	MPC · JPL
516415	2002 RX_{270}	—	September 1, 2002	Palomar	NEAT	·	1.4 km	MPC · JPL
516416	2002 TC_{307}	—	October 4, 2002	Apache Point	SDSS	·	800 m	MPC · JPL
516417	2002 UD_{5}	—	October 28, 2002	Palomar	NEAT	PHO	2.2 km	MPC · JPL
516418	2002 VH_{12}	—	November 2, 2002	Haleakala	NEAT	·	1.4 km	MPC · JPL
516419	2002 VU_{149}	—	November 22, 2014	Mount Lemmon	Mount Lemmon Survey	L5	8.4 km	MPC · JPL
516420	2003 FS_{2}	—	March 25, 2003	Haleakala	NEAT	AMO	540 m	MPC · JPL
516421	2003 GU_{21}	—	April 7, 2003	Kitt Peak	Spacewatch	H	330 m	MPC · JPL
516422	2003 GX_{24}	—	April 7, 2003	Kitt Peak	Spacewatch	H	360 m	MPC · JPL
516423	2003 JC_{11}	—	May 1, 2003	Kitt Peak	Spacewatch	T_{j} (2.94) · AMO	670 m	MPC · JPL
516424	2003 JP_{18}	—	December 28, 2005	Mount Lemmon	Mount Lemmon Survey	NYS	960 m	MPC · JPL
516425	2003 SW_{34}	—	September 18, 2003	Kitt Peak	Spacewatch	·	1.3 km	MPC · JPL
516426	2003 SB_{435}	—	September 29, 2003	Anderson Mesa	LONEOS	EUN	1.5 km	MPC · JPL
516427	2003 TH_{8}	—	October 2, 2003	Kitt Peak	Spacewatch	·	2.5 km	MPC · JPL
516428	2003 UR_{12}	—	October 21, 2003	Socorro	LINEAR	T_{j} (2.7) · AMO +1km	1.0 km	MPC · JPL
516429	2003 UR_{248}	—	October 25, 2003	Socorro	LINEAR	·	4.5 km	MPC · JPL
516430	2003 UV_{280}	—	October 28, 2003	Socorro	LINEAR	H	570 m	MPC · JPL
516431	2004 DZ	—	February 16, 2004	Socorro	LINEAR	·	860 m	MPC · JPL
516432	2004 DT_{9}	—	February 17, 2004	Kitt Peak	Spacewatch	V	710 m	MPC · JPL
516433	2004 EF_{82}	—	February 17, 2004	Catalina	CSS	·	690 m	MPC · JPL
516434	2004 EA_{115}	—	February 16, 2004	Kitt Peak	Spacewatch	·	610 m	MPC · JPL
516435	2004 FJ_{29}	—	March 29, 2004	Siding Spring	SSS	ATE	190 m	MPC · JPL
516436	2004 FK_{38}	—	March 17, 2004	Socorro	LINEAR	·	2.2 km	MPC · JPL
516437	2004 GN_{15}	—	April 14, 2004	Socorro	LINEAR	H	590 m	MPC · JPL
516438	2004 JA_{8}	—	May 10, 2004	Kitt Peak	Spacewatch	·	770 m	MPC · JPL
516439	2004 QY_{27}	—	August 22, 2004	Kitt Peak	Spacewatch	·	1.4 km	MPC · JPL
516440	2004 RZ_{160}	—	September 10, 2004	Kitt Peak	Spacewatch	·	1.4 km	MPC · JPL
516441	2004 SY_{56}	—	September 16, 2004	Anderson Mesa	LONEOS	·	1.1 km	MPC · JPL
516442	2004 TV_{185}	—	October 7, 2004	Kitt Peak	Spacewatch	·	3.1 km	MPC · JPL
516443	2004 TY_{198}	—	October 7, 2004	Kitt Peak	Spacewatch	THM	2.5 km	MPC · JPL
516444	2004 TM_{199}	—	October 7, 2004	Kitt Peak	Spacewatch	·	2.7 km	MPC · JPL
516445	2004 WO_{8}	—	November 17, 2004	Campo Imperatore	CINEOS	·	3.4 km	MPC · JPL
516446	2004 XP_{40}	—	December 11, 2004	Socorro	LINEAR	H	470 m	MPC · JPL
516447	2005 AP_{16}	—	January 6, 2005	Socorro	LINEAR	·	1.5 km	MPC · JPL
516448	2005 AN_{44}	—	January 15, 2005	Kitt Peak	Spacewatch	·	1.2 km	MPC · JPL
516449	2005 CE_{11}	—	February 1, 2005	Kitt Peak	Spacewatch	·	1.2 km	MPC · JPL
516450	2005 CY_{41}	—	February 2, 2005	Kitt Peak	Spacewatch	(5)	980 m	MPC · JPL
516451	2005 EZ_{167}	—	March 11, 2005	Mount Lemmon	Mount Lemmon Survey	H	420 m	MPC · JPL
516452	2005 ET_{211}	—	March 4, 2005	Mount Lemmon	Mount Lemmon Survey	·	1.1 km	MPC · JPL
516453	2005 EB_{253}	—	March 10, 2005	Catalina	CSS	·	1.8 km	MPC · JPL
516454	2005 FN_{4}	—	March 31, 2005	Anderson Mesa	LONEOS	T_{j} (2.76) · APO	660 m	MPC · JPL
516455	2005 GC_{36}	—	April 2, 2005	Mount Lemmon	Mount Lemmon Survey	HNS	990 m	MPC · JPL
516456	2005 GK_{93}	—	March 30, 2005	Catalina	CSS	·	1.6 km	MPC · JPL
516457	2005 HM_{3}	—	April 20, 2005	Catalina	CSS	AMO	380 m	MPC · JPL
516458	2005 JP_{147}	—	May 12, 2005	Catalina	CSS	H	460 m	MPC · JPL
516459	2005 LP_{7}	—	May 8, 2005	Mount Lemmon	Mount Lemmon Survey	·	1.7 km	MPC · JPL
516460	2005 LW_{7}	—	June 6, 2005	Siding Spring	SSS	·	560 m	MPC · JPL
516461	2005 LF_{8}	—	June 6, 2005	Siding Spring	SSS	·	560 m	MPC · JPL
516462	2005 LF_{38}	—	June 11, 2005	Kitt Peak	Spacewatch	·	660 m	MPC · JPL
516463	2005 MW_{13}	—	June 28, 2005	Kitt Peak	Spacewatch	EUN	1.3 km	MPC · JPL
516464	2005 ML_{24}	—	June 30, 2005	Kitt Peak	Spacewatch	·	570 m	MPC · JPL
516465	2005 MQ_{41}	—	June 30, 2005	Kitt Peak	Spacewatch	·	660 m	MPC · JPL
516466	2005 NV_{81}	—	July 5, 2005	Kitt Peak	Spacewatch	·	2.9 km	MPC · JPL
516467	2005 OM_{20}	—	July 28, 2005	Palomar	NEAT	·	620 m	MPC · JPL
516468	2005 QY_{12}	—	August 24, 2005	Palomar	NEAT	·	2.3 km	MPC · JPL
516469	2005 QU_{55}	—	August 28, 2005	Kitt Peak	Spacewatch	·	610 m	MPC · JPL
516470	2005 SV_{14}	—	September 26, 2005	Kitt Peak	Spacewatch	·	740 m	MPC · JPL
516471	2005 SV_{71}	—	September 23, 2005	Catalina	CSS	·	760 m	MPC · JPL
516472	2005 SF_{140}	—	September 25, 2005	Kitt Peak	Spacewatch	·	1.7 km	MPC · JPL
516473	2005 TY_{12}	—	September 26, 2005	Kitt Peak	Spacewatch	(2076)	750 m	MPC · JPL
516474	2005 TF_{31}	—	October 1, 2005	Kitt Peak	Spacewatch	KOR	1.0 km	MPC · JPL
516475	2005 TS_{51}	—	September 30, 2005	Catalina	CSS	·	1.2 km	MPC · JPL
516476	2005 TS_{86}	—	September 27, 2005	Kitt Peak	Spacewatch	·	320 m	MPC · JPL
516477	2005 TH_{113}	—	September 27, 2005	Kitt Peak	Spacewatch	EOS	1.3 km	MPC · JPL
516478	2005 UP_{4}	—	October 25, 2005	Socorro	LINEAR	T_{j} (2.94)	3.2 km	MPC · JPL
516479	2005 UX_{31}	—	October 24, 2005	Kitt Peak	Spacewatch	·	2.7 km	MPC · JPL
516480	2005 UK_{36}	—	October 24, 2005	Kitt Peak	Spacewatch	·	1.7 km	MPC · JPL
516481	2005 UL_{87}	—	October 1, 2005	Mount Lemmon	Mount Lemmon Survey	·	600 m	MPC · JPL
516482	2005 UR_{88}	—	October 22, 2005	Kitt Peak	Spacewatch	·	720 m	MPC · JPL
516483	2005 UR_{120}	—	October 27, 2005	Kitt Peak	Spacewatch	EOS	1.5 km	MPC · JPL
516484	2005 UT_{140}	—	October 25, 2005	Mount Lemmon	Mount Lemmon Survey	·	730 m	MPC · JPL
516485	2005 UJ_{160}	—	September 23, 2005	Kitt Peak	Spacewatch	·	970 m	MPC · JPL
516486	2005 UZ_{219}	—	October 25, 2005	Kitt Peak	Spacewatch	·	870 m	MPC · JPL
516487	2005 UO_{281}	—	October 25, 2005	Mount Lemmon	Mount Lemmon Survey	·	1.8 km	MPC · JPL
516488	2005 UV_{295}	—	October 26, 2005	Kitt Peak	Spacewatch	·	900 m	MPC · JPL
516489	2005 UB_{307}	—	October 27, 2005	Mount Lemmon	Mount Lemmon Survey	·	2.5 km	MPC · JPL
516490	2005 UK_{474}	—	October 31, 2005	Socorro	LINEAR	V	600 m	MPC · JPL
516491	2005 VH_{43}	—	November 4, 2005	Catalina	CSS	·	950 m	MPC · JPL
516492	2005 VW_{64}	—	October 25, 2005	Kitt Peak	Spacewatch	·	630 m	MPC · JPL
516493	2005 WR_{35}	—	September 18, 2001	Anderson Mesa	LONEOS	NYS	1 km	MPC · JPL
516494	2005 WH_{49}	—	November 25, 2005	Kitt Peak	Spacewatch	MAS	550 m	MPC · JPL
516495	2005 WU_{164}	—	October 28, 2005	Kitt Peak	Spacewatch	·	840 m	MPC · JPL
516496	2005 WT_{166}	—	November 4, 2005	Kitt Peak	Spacewatch	MAS	540 m	MPC · JPL
516497	2005 WP_{210}	—	November 26, 2005	Kitt Peak	Spacewatch	EOS	1.4 km	MPC · JPL
516498	2005 YZ_{25}	—	December 24, 2005	Kitt Peak	Spacewatch	MAS	540 m	MPC · JPL
516499	2005 YW_{133}	—	December 26, 2005	Kitt Peak	Spacewatch	·	2.3 km	MPC · JPL
516500	2005 YM_{134}	—	December 26, 2005	Kitt Peak	Spacewatch	·	3.0 km	MPC · JPL

== 516501–516600 ==
back to top

Designation			Discovery			Properties		Ref
Permanent	Provisional	Named after	Date	Site	Discoverer(s)	Category	Diam.	Ref
516501	2005 YN_{171}	—	November 28, 2005	Catalina	CSS	·	2.6 km	MPC · JPL
516502	2005 YE_{263}	—	December 25, 2005	Kitt Peak	Spacewatch	URS	3.3 km	MPC · JPL
516503	2006 AK_{25}	—	December 24, 2005	Kitt Peak	Spacewatch	·	2.1 km	MPC · JPL
516504	2006 AC_{29}	—	December 24, 2005	Kitt Peak	Spacewatch	·	2.0 km	MPC · JPL
516505	2006 AC_{38}	—	January 5, 2006	Mount Lemmon	Mount Lemmon Survey	PHO	770 m	MPC · JPL
516506	2006 AC_{108}	—	January 4, 2006	Mount Lemmon	Mount Lemmon Survey	·	1.2 km	MPC · JPL
516507	2006 BV_{30}	—	January 20, 2006	Kitt Peak	Spacewatch	·	3.5 km	MPC · JPL
516508	2006 BV_{100}	—	December 5, 2005	Mount Lemmon	Mount Lemmon Survey	·	1.1 km	MPC · JPL
516509	2006 BU_{106}	—	January 25, 2006	Kitt Peak	Spacewatch	·	2.0 km	MPC · JPL
516510	2006 BS_{182}	—	January 8, 2006	Kitt Peak	Spacewatch	·	2.9 km	MPC · JPL
516511	2006 BP_{234}	—	January 23, 2006	Kitt Peak	Spacewatch	·	920 m	MPC · JPL
516512	2006 BJ_{249}	—	January 31, 2006	Kitt Peak	Spacewatch	·	2.2 km	MPC · JPL
516513	2006 CX_{68}	—	February 1, 2006	Kitt Peak	Spacewatch	·	3.1 km	MPC · JPL
516514	2006 DE_{17}	—	February 20, 2006	Kitt Peak	Spacewatch	·	2.2 km	MPC · JPL
516515	2006 DP_{173}	—	February 27, 2006	Kitt Peak	Spacewatch	·	2.8 km	MPC · JPL
516516	2006 DQ_{205}	—	February 25, 2006	Mount Lemmon	Mount Lemmon Survey	·	2.4 km	MPC · JPL
516517	2006 ES_{2}	—	February 1, 2006	Kitt Peak	Spacewatch	L5	10 km	MPC · JPL
516518	2006 HJ_{4}	—	April 19, 2006	Kitt Peak	Spacewatch	·	650 m	MPC · JPL
516519	2006 HS_{26}	—	April 20, 2006	Kitt Peak	Spacewatch	·	850 m	MPC · JPL
516520	2006 KS_{25}	—	May 19, 2006	Mount Lemmon	Mount Lemmon Survey	·	860 m	MPC · JPL
516521	2006 KE_{105}	—	May 28, 2006	Kitt Peak	Spacewatch	·	870 m	MPC · JPL
516522	2006 QC_{102}	—	August 19, 2006	Kitt Peak	Spacewatch	·	950 m	MPC · JPL
516523	2006 QX_{145}	—	August 18, 2006	Kitt Peak	Spacewatch	·	2.0 km	MPC · JPL
516524	2006 RE_{7}	—	September 14, 2006	Kitt Peak	Spacewatch	·	1.6 km	MPC · JPL
516525	2006 RG_{11}	—	August 30, 2006	Socorro	LINEAR	·	1.3 km	MPC · JPL
516526	2006 RB_{42}	—	September 14, 2006	Kitt Peak	Spacewatch	·	1.8 km	MPC · JPL
516527	2006 RC_{77}	—	September 15, 2006	Kitt Peak	Spacewatch	·	1.5 km	MPC · JPL
516528	2006 RJ_{93}	—	August 28, 2006	Catalina	CSS	·	1.8 km	MPC · JPL
516529	2006 SK_{4}	—	September 16, 2006	Catalina	CSS	·	1.4 km	MPC · JPL
516530	2006 SZ_{20}	—	September 16, 2006	Anderson Mesa	LONEOS	·	920 m	MPC · JPL
516531	2006 SF_{22}	—	September 17, 2006	Anderson Mesa	LONEOS	·	990 m	MPC · JPL
516532	2006 SK_{100}	—	September 15, 2006	Kitt Peak	Spacewatch	·	1.4 km	MPC · JPL
516533	2006 SJ_{110}	—	September 20, 2006	Catalina	CSS	JUN	1.2 km	MPC · JPL
516534	2006 SO_{140}	—	September 22, 2006	Catalina	CSS	H	480 m	MPC · JPL
516535	2006 SZ_{155}	—	September 14, 2006	Kitt Peak	Spacewatch	·	980 m	MPC · JPL
516536	2006 SF_{220}	—	September 25, 2006	Mount Lemmon	Mount Lemmon Survey	H	380 m	MPC · JPL
516537	2006 SN_{227}	—	September 26, 2006	Kitt Peak	Spacewatch	·	2.0 km	MPC · JPL
516538	2006 SV_{237}	—	September 26, 2006	Kitt Peak	Spacewatch	·	1.9 km	MPC · JPL
516539	2006 SN_{246}	—	September 15, 2006	Kitt Peak	Spacewatch	·	510 m	MPC · JPL
516540	2006 SL_{269}	—	September 26, 2006	Mount Lemmon	Mount Lemmon Survey	·	1.9 km	MPC · JPL
516541	2006 SX_{294}	—	September 17, 2006	Kitt Peak	Spacewatch	·	650 m	MPC · JPL
516542	2006 SF_{312}	—	September 17, 2006	Kitt Peak	Spacewatch	·	1.7 km	MPC · JPL
516543	2006 SH_{367}	—	September 25, 2006	Anderson Mesa	LONEOS	MRX	1.1 km	MPC · JPL
516544	2006 SW_{374}	—	September 16, 2006	Apache Point	A. C. Becker	·	1.2 km	MPC · JPL
516545	2006 TY_{13}	—	October 10, 2006	Palomar	NEAT	·	2.2 km	MPC · JPL
516546	2006 TK_{89}	—	September 30, 2006	Mount Lemmon	Mount Lemmon Survey	(883)	670 m	MPC · JPL
516547	2006 TG_{106}	—	September 28, 2006	Kitt Peak	Spacewatch	H	390 m	MPC · JPL
516548	2006 UO_{76}	—	October 17, 2006	Mount Lemmon	Mount Lemmon Survey	NEM	1.9 km	MPC · JPL
516549	2006 UL_{122}	—	October 19, 2006	Kitt Peak	Spacewatch	·	2.2 km	MPC · JPL
516550	2006 UG_{286}	—	October 28, 2006	Kitt Peak	Spacewatch	·	440 m	MPC · JPL
516551	2006 VR_{11}	—	October 13, 2006	Kitt Peak	Spacewatch	·	1.6 km	MPC · JPL
516552	2006 VT_{46}	—	November 9, 2006	Kitt Peak	Spacewatch	·	1.5 km	MPC · JPL
516553	2006 VT_{66}	—	October 16, 2006	Catalina	CSS	BRA	1.6 km	MPC · JPL
516554	2006 VH_{136}	—	November 15, 2006	Kitt Peak	Spacewatch	·	580 m	MPC · JPL
516555	2006 VZ_{137}	—	November 15, 2006	Kitt Peak	Spacewatch	·	1.5 km	MPC · JPL
516556	2006 WG_{3}	—	October 30, 2006	Catalina	CSS	H	450 m	MPC · JPL
516557	2006 WW_{123}	—	January 30, 2004	Catalina	CSS	H	720 m	MPC · JPL
516558	2006 WY_{170}	—	November 23, 2006	Kitt Peak	Spacewatch	·	1.9 km	MPC · JPL
516559	2006 XG_{56}	—	November 15, 2006	Catalina	CSS	H	580 m	MPC · JPL
516560 Annapolisroyal	2006 XL_{67}	Annapolisroyal	December 12, 2006	Mauna Kea	D. D. Balam	·	1.9 km	MPC · JPL
516561	2006 YZ_{35}	—	December 21, 2006	Kitt Peak	Spacewatch	·	700 m	MPC · JPL
516562	2007 BF_{61}	—	January 9, 2007	Mount Lemmon	Mount Lemmon Survey	H	480 m	MPC · JPL
516563	2007 BW_{69}	—	December 16, 2006	Mount Lemmon	Mount Lemmon Survey	·	660 m	MPC · JPL
516564	2007 CS_{37}	—	November 21, 2006	Mount Lemmon	Mount Lemmon Survey	·	1.4 km	MPC · JPL
516565	2007 DH_{30}	—	February 17, 2007	Kitt Peak	Spacewatch	·	1 km	MPC · JPL
516566	2007 DH_{36}	—	February 17, 2007	Kitt Peak	Spacewatch	·	840 m	MPC · JPL
516567	2007 DY_{92}	—	January 27, 2007	Mount Lemmon	Mount Lemmon Survey	·	670 m	MPC · JPL
516568	2007 DC_{94}	—	February 23, 2007	Kitt Peak	Spacewatch	·	2.1 km	MPC · JPL
516569	2007 DJ_{101}	—	February 26, 2007	Mount Lemmon	Mount Lemmon Survey	NYS	840 m	MPC · JPL
516570	2007 DH_{112}	—	February 27, 2007	Kitt Peak	Spacewatch	NYS	880 m	MPC · JPL
516571	2007 DL_{114}	—	February 26, 2007	Mount Lemmon	Mount Lemmon Survey	NYS	820 m	MPC · JPL
516572	2007 DR_{117}	—	February 23, 2007	Kitt Peak	Spacewatch	EOS	1.8 km	MPC · JPL
516573	2007 EQ_{8}	—	March 9, 2007	Mount Lemmon	Mount Lemmon Survey	·	2.6 km	MPC · JPL
516574	2007 ES_{17}	—	February 23, 2007	Mount Lemmon	Mount Lemmon Survey	MAS	540 m	MPC · JPL
516575	2007 EC_{40}	—	March 11, 2007	Kitt Peak	Spacewatch	NYS	840 m	MPC · JPL
516576	2007 EP_{58}	—	January 28, 2007	Mount Lemmon	Mount Lemmon Survey	·	2.2 km	MPC · JPL
516577	2007 ER_{73}	—	February 21, 2007	Kitt Peak	Spacewatch	MAS	510 m	MPC · JPL
516578	2007 EG_{103}	—	October 1, 2005	Mount Lemmon	Mount Lemmon Survey	·	790 m	MPC · JPL
516579	2007 EZ_{125}	—	February 17, 2007	Kitt Peak	Spacewatch	·	2.0 km	MPC · JPL
516580	2007 EE_{128}	—	March 9, 2007	Mount Lemmon	Mount Lemmon Survey	MAS	580 m	MPC · JPL
516581	2007 ED_{130}	—	January 27, 2007	Mount Lemmon	Mount Lemmon Survey	MAS	630 m	MPC · JPL
516582	2007 EP_{167}	—	February 17, 2007	Mount Lemmon	Mount Lemmon Survey	·	960 m	MPC · JPL
516583	2007 EZ_{176}	—	March 14, 2007	Kitt Peak	Spacewatch	·	2.7 km	MPC · JPL
516584	2007 EQ_{177}	—	March 14, 2007	Kitt Peak	Spacewatch	·	2.2 km	MPC · JPL
516585	2007 ES_{219}	—	March 11, 2007	Mount Lemmon	Mount Lemmon Survey	·	2.3 km	MPC · JPL
516586	2007 FE_{25}	—	March 20, 2007	Kitt Peak	Spacewatch	MAS	540 m	MPC · JPL
516587	2007 FX_{36}	—	March 14, 2007	Mount Lemmon	Mount Lemmon Survey	·	2.1 km	MPC · JPL
516588	2007 FY_{45}	—	March 18, 2007	Kitt Peak	Spacewatch	H	470 m	MPC · JPL
516589	2007 FZ_{45}	—	March 20, 2007	Kitt Peak	Spacewatch	NYS	790 m	MPC · JPL
516590	2007 GX_{42}	—	April 14, 2007	Kitt Peak	Spacewatch	MAS	560 m	MPC · JPL
516591	2007 GQ_{50}	—	April 15, 2007	Kitt Peak	Spacewatch	·	940 m	MPC · JPL
516592	2007 GQ_{66}	—	March 15, 2007	Mount Lemmon	Mount Lemmon Survey	LIX	3.0 km	MPC · JPL
516593	2007 HA_{36}	—	April 11, 2007	Mount Lemmon	Mount Lemmon Survey	THM	2.1 km	MPC · JPL
516594	2007 HU_{66}	—	April 22, 2007	Mount Lemmon	Mount Lemmon Survey	ERI	1.4 km	MPC · JPL
516595	2007 HC_{73}	—	April 22, 2007	Kitt Peak	Spacewatch	MAS	670 m	MPC · JPL
516596	2007 HQ_{75}	—	March 15, 2007	Mount Lemmon	Mount Lemmon Survey	·	1.1 km	MPC · JPL
516597	2007 HS_{79}	—	April 11, 2007	Mount Lemmon	Mount Lemmon Survey	·	900 m	MPC · JPL
516598	2007 HF_{80}	—	April 24, 2007	Kitt Peak	Spacewatch	·	1.1 km	MPC · JPL
516599	2007 HC_{92}	—	October 22, 2003	Kitt Peak	Spacewatch	·	3.8 km	MPC · JPL
516600	2007 JZ_{5}	—	May 9, 2007	Mount Lemmon	Mount Lemmon Survey	MAS	580 m	MPC · JPL

== 516601–516700 ==
back to top

Designation			Discovery			Properties		Ref
Permanent	Provisional	Named after	Date	Site	Discoverer(s)	Category	Diam.	Ref
516601	2007 JR_{26}	—	May 9, 2007	Kitt Peak	Spacewatch	·	1.1 km	MPC · JPL
516602	2007 JV_{35}	—	April 25, 2007	Mount Lemmon	Mount Lemmon Survey	·	1.4 km	MPC · JPL
516603	2007 JW_{37}	—	April 22, 2007	Mount Lemmon	Mount Lemmon Survey	H	580 m	MPC · JPL
516604	2007 JK_{46}	—	October 1, 2013	Kitt Peak	Spacewatch	L5	9.0 km	MPC · JPL
516605	2007 KG_{4}	—	May 18, 2007	Bergisch Gladbach	W. Bickel	·	2.7 km	MPC · JPL
516606	2007 LA_{6}	—	April 24, 2007	Mount Lemmon	Mount Lemmon Survey	THB	1.7 km	MPC · JPL
516607	2007 LD_{22}	—	June 13, 2007	Kitt Peak	Spacewatch	·	2.4 km	MPC · JPL
516608	2007 MA_{5}	—	May 19, 2007	Catalina	CSS	T_{j} (2.96)	4.1 km	MPC · JPL
516609	2007 OH_{11}	—	July 18, 2007	Mount Lemmon	Mount Lemmon Survey	·	1.1 km	MPC · JPL
516610	2007 RM_{177}	—	September 10, 2007	Mount Lemmon	Mount Lemmon Survey	RAF	800 m	MPC · JPL
516611	2007 RX_{251}	—	September 13, 2007	Kitt Peak	Spacewatch	·	1.0 km	MPC · JPL
516612	2007 SN_{22}	—	September 18, 2007	Mount Lemmon	Mount Lemmon Survey	·	1.5 km	MPC · JPL
516613	2007 TT_{97}	—	September 17, 2007	XuYi	PMO NEO Survey Program	·	1.4 km	MPC · JPL
516614	2007 TQ_{362}	—	October 15, 2007	Mount Lemmon	Mount Lemmon Survey	DOR	2.1 km	MPC · JPL
516615	2007 TM_{370}	—	October 12, 2007	Mount Lemmon	Mount Lemmon Survey	·	1.6 km	MPC · JPL
516616	2007 UF_{26}	—	September 25, 2007	Mount Lemmon	Mount Lemmon Survey	·	1.1 km	MPC · JPL
516617	2007 UN_{47}	—	October 10, 2007	Catalina	CSS	·	1.9 km	MPC · JPL
516618	2007 UJ_{112}	—	October 10, 2007	Kitt Peak	Spacewatch	·	1.3 km	MPC · JPL
516619	2007 UZ_{118}	—	September 20, 2007	Kitt Peak	Spacewatch	·	1.5 km	MPC · JPL
516620	2007 VR_{159}	—	November 5, 2007	Kitt Peak	Spacewatch	·	1.5 km	MPC · JPL
516621	2007 YK_{20}	—	December 4, 2007	Kitt Peak	Spacewatch	·	1.6 km	MPC · JPL
516622	2007 YB_{42}	—	December 30, 2007	Kitt Peak	Spacewatch	·	540 m	MPC · JPL
516623	2008 AO_{120}	—	December 30, 2007	Kitt Peak	Spacewatch	GEF	1.1 km	MPC · JPL
516624	2008 BC_{38}	—	January 31, 2008	Mount Lemmon	Mount Lemmon Survey	·	2.3 km	MPC · JPL
516625	2008 BT_{54}	—	January 31, 2008	Mount Lemmon	Mount Lemmon Survey	·	1.8 km	MPC · JPL
516626	2008 CB_{104}	—	February 9, 2008	Mount Lemmon	Mount Lemmon Survey	·	2.0 km	MPC · JPL
516627	2008 CJ_{126}	—	February 8, 2008	Kitt Peak	Spacewatch	·	460 m	MPC · JPL
516628	2008 CM_{153}	—	February 9, 2008	Kitt Peak	Spacewatch	·	1.5 km	MPC · JPL
516629	2008 CZ_{170}	—	February 12, 2008	Mount Lemmon	Mount Lemmon Survey	GEF	980 m	MPC · JPL
516630	2008 DY_{9}	—	February 26, 2008	Kitt Peak	Spacewatch	WIT	980 m	MPC · JPL
516631	2008 DP_{80}	—	January 11, 2008	Kitt Peak	Spacewatch	·	1.8 km	MPC · JPL
516632	2008 EB_{29}	—	March 4, 2008	Mount Lemmon	Mount Lemmon Survey	·	700 m	MPC · JPL
516633	2008 EQ_{58}	—	February 12, 2008	Kitt Peak	Spacewatch	·	2.0 km	MPC · JPL
516634	2008 EE_{148}	—	March 1, 2008	Kitt Peak	Spacewatch	·	1.3 km	MPC · JPL
516635	2008 EE_{164}	—	March 13, 2008	Mount Lemmon	Mount Lemmon Survey	H	450 m	MPC · JPL
516636	2008 FD_{130}	—	March 29, 2008	Kitt Peak	Spacewatch	·	620 m	MPC · JPL
516637	2008 FX_{132}	—	March 30, 2008	Kitt Peak	Spacewatch	·	1.6 km	MPC · JPL
516638	2008 GD_{29}	—	March 27, 2008	Mount Lemmon	Mount Lemmon Survey	KOR	920 m	MPC · JPL
516639	2008 GX_{35}	—	April 3, 2008	Mount Lemmon	Mount Lemmon Survey	·	470 m	MPC · JPL
516640	2008 GC_{98}	—	April 8, 2008	Kitt Peak	Spacewatch	·	1.5 km	MPC · JPL
516641	2008 GB_{110}	—	April 14, 2008	Socorro	LINEAR	AMO	410 m	MPC · JPL
516642	2008 GX_{127}	—	April 6, 2008	Kitt Peak	Spacewatch	EOS	1.5 km	MPC · JPL
516643	2008 GH_{137}	—	April 4, 2008	Mount Lemmon	Mount Lemmon Survey	·	860 m	MPC · JPL
516644	2008 GM_{144}	—	April 4, 2008	Kitt Peak	Spacewatch	·	720 m	MPC · JPL
516645	2008 HQ_{7}	—	April 24, 2008	Kitt Peak	Spacewatch	·	700 m	MPC · JPL
516646	2008 HM_{14}	—	October 21, 2006	Kitt Peak	Spacewatch	·	700 m	MPC · JPL
516647	2008 HP_{46}	—	April 4, 2008	Kitt Peak	Spacewatch	·	610 m	MPC · JPL
516648	2008 HB_{54}	—	April 29, 2008	Kitt Peak	Spacewatch	(2076)	680 m	MPC · JPL
516649	2008 JG_{25}	—	April 5, 2008	Kitt Peak	Spacewatch	·	690 m	MPC · JPL
516650	2008 JB_{30}	—	May 11, 2008	Kitt Peak	Spacewatch	·	2.5 km	MPC · JPL
516651	2008 KB_{1}	—	May 26, 2008	Kitt Peak	Spacewatch	·	2.4 km	MPC · JPL
516652	2008 KA_{4}	—	April 30, 2008	Mount Lemmon	Mount Lemmon Survey	·	530 m	MPC · JPL
516653	2008 KH_{22}	—	May 28, 2008	Mount Lemmon	Mount Lemmon Survey	·	670 m	MPC · JPL
516654	2008 OB	—	July 3, 2008	Siding Spring	SSS	PHO	740 m	MPC · JPL
516655	2008 OA_{7}	—	July 3, 2008	Catalina	CSS	·	2.1 km	MPC · JPL
516656	2008 ON_{24}	—	July 30, 2008	Mount Lemmon	Mount Lemmon Survey	·	2.7 km	MPC · JPL
516657	2008 OW_{25}	—	July 28, 2008	Mount Lemmon	Mount Lemmon Survey	·	1.7 km	MPC · JPL
516658	2008 RU_{79}	—	September 3, 2008	La Sagra	OAM	H	450 m	MPC · JPL
516659	2008 RY_{101}	—	September 2, 2008	Kitt Peak	Spacewatch	·	980 m	MPC · JPL
516660	2008 RW_{147}	—	September 9, 2008	Mount Lemmon	Mount Lemmon Survey	·	980 m	MPC · JPL
516661	2008 SF_{10}	—	September 6, 2008	Kitt Peak	Spacewatch	NYS	1.2 km	MPC · JPL
516662	2008 SD_{30}	—	September 19, 2008	Kitt Peak	Spacewatch	·	1.4 km	MPC · JPL
516663	2008 SK_{35}	—	September 20, 2008	Kitt Peak	Spacewatch	·	1.2 km	MPC · JPL
516664	2008 SY_{62}	—	September 21, 2008	Kitt Peak	Spacewatch	PHO	860 m	MPC · JPL
516665	2008 ST_{66}	—	September 21, 2008	Catalina	CSS	·	1.0 km	MPC · JPL
516666	2008 SS_{77}	—	September 23, 2008	Mount Lemmon	Mount Lemmon Survey	·	1.9 km	MPC · JPL
516667	2008 SA_{99}	—	September 21, 2008	Kitt Peak	Spacewatch	·	770 m	MPC · JPL
516668	2008 SE_{121}	—	September 22, 2008	Mount Lemmon	Mount Lemmon Survey	·	3.2 km	MPC · JPL
516669	2008 SK_{149}	—	September 24, 2008	Kitt Peak	Spacewatch	·	1.3 km	MPC · JPL
516670	2008 SD_{183}	—	September 24, 2008	Mount Lemmon	Mount Lemmon Survey	·	1.0 km	MPC · JPL
516671	2008 SM_{225}	—	September 22, 2008	Mount Lemmon	Mount Lemmon Survey	·	1.4 km	MPC · JPL
516672	2008 ST_{253}	—	September 22, 2008	Kitt Peak	Spacewatch	MAS	650 m	MPC · JPL
516673	2008 SE_{269}	—	September 21, 2008	Kitt Peak	Spacewatch	·	1.3 km	MPC · JPL
516674	2008 SF_{303}	—	September 24, 2008	Mount Lemmon	Mount Lemmon Survey	·	1.1 km	MPC · JPL
516675	2008 SB_{312}	—	September 23, 2008	Mount Lemmon	Mount Lemmon Survey	·	1.4 km	MPC · JPL
516676	2008 SD_{312}	—	September 23, 2008	Mount Lemmon	Mount Lemmon Survey	(5)	1.0 km	MPC · JPL
516677	2008 SF_{312}	—	September 24, 2008	Mount Lemmon	Mount Lemmon Survey	·	1.9 km	MPC · JPL
516678	2008 SH_{312}	—	September 24, 2008	Mount Lemmon	Mount Lemmon Survey	·	1.9 km	MPC · JPL
516679	2008 SJ_{312}	—	September 24, 2008	Mount Lemmon	Mount Lemmon Survey	·	1.6 km	MPC · JPL
516680	2008 SK_{312}	—	August 24, 2008	Kitt Peak	Spacewatch	·	2.0 km	MPC · JPL
516681	2008 SL_{312}	—	September 27, 2008	Mount Lemmon	Mount Lemmon Survey	·	980 m	MPC · JPL
516682	2008 TT_{1}	—	September 21, 2008	Kitt Peak	Spacewatch	·	1.7 km	MPC · JPL
516683	2008 TM_{87}	—	October 3, 2008	Kitt Peak	Spacewatch	H	360 m	MPC · JPL
516684	2008 TF_{106}	—	October 6, 2008	Kitt Peak	Spacewatch	CLA	1.5 km	MPC · JPL
516685	2008 TQ_{149}	—	September 28, 2008	Mount Lemmon	Mount Lemmon Survey	CYB	3.2 km	MPC · JPL
516686	2008 TU_{191}	—	October 8, 2008	Kitt Peak	Spacewatch	PHO	880 m	MPC · JPL
516687	2008 TY_{191}	—	October 2, 2008	Mount Lemmon	Mount Lemmon Survey	·	1.4 km	MPC · JPL
516688	2008 TA_{192}	—	October 6, 2008	Mount Lemmon	Mount Lemmon Survey	·	1.5 km	MPC · JPL
516689	2008 TD_{192}	—	October 10, 2008	Mount Lemmon	Mount Lemmon Survey	·	2.7 km	MPC · JPL
516690	2008 US_{128}	—	October 23, 2008	Kitt Peak	Spacewatch	·	1.0 km	MPC · JPL
516691	2008 UD_{130}	—	October 23, 2008	Kitt Peak	Spacewatch	MAS	590 m	MPC · JPL
516692	2008 UA_{150}	—	September 23, 2008	Kitt Peak	Spacewatch	·	2.6 km	MPC · JPL
516693	2008 UF_{166}	—	October 24, 2008	Kitt Peak	Spacewatch	MAS	650 m	MPC · JPL
516694	2008 UR_{180}	—	October 24, 2008	Kitt Peak	Spacewatch	·	1.1 km	MPC · JPL
516695	2008 UT_{200}	—	September 30, 2008	Catalina	CSS	H	600 m	MPC · JPL
516696	2008 UX_{342}	—	September 29, 2008	Mount Lemmon	Mount Lemmon Survey	H	490 m	MPC · JPL
516697	2008 UB_{357}	—	October 24, 2008	Kitt Peak	Spacewatch	·	1.2 km	MPC · JPL
516698	2008 UG_{358}	—	October 25, 2008	Mount Lemmon	Mount Lemmon Survey	·	810 m	MPC · JPL
516699	2008 UA_{374}	—	April 2, 2006	Kitt Peak	Spacewatch	·	2.4 km	MPC · JPL
516700	2008 VK_{20}	—	November 1, 2008	Mount Lemmon	Mount Lemmon Survey	MAS	790 m	MPC · JPL

== 516701–516800 ==
back to top

Designation			Discovery			Properties		Ref
Permanent	Provisional	Named after	Date	Site	Discoverer(s)	Category	Diam.	Ref
516701	2008 VB_{28}	—	October 6, 2008	Mount Lemmon	Mount Lemmon Survey	H	470 m	MPC · JPL
516702	2008 VV_{36}	—	November 2, 2008	Mount Lemmon	Mount Lemmon Survey	H	540 m	MPC · JPL
516703	2008 VZ_{81}	—	October 3, 2008	Mount Lemmon	Mount Lemmon Survey	·	2.3 km	MPC · JPL
516704	2008 VA_{82}	—	November 6, 2008	Mount Lemmon	Mount Lemmon Survey	·	2.0 km	MPC · JPL
516705	2008 VC_{82}	—	November 7, 2008	Mount Lemmon	Mount Lemmon Survey	·	1.8 km	MPC · JPL
516706	2008 WA_{137}	—	November 21, 2008	Kitt Peak	Spacewatch	·	1.6 km	MPC · JPL
516707	2008 WN_{140}	—	November 9, 2008	Mount Lemmon	Mount Lemmon Survey	·	1 km	MPC · JPL
516708	2008 WZ_{142}	—	October 9, 2008	Mount Lemmon	Mount Lemmon Survey	·	2.3 km	MPC · JPL
516709	2008 YC_{80}	—	December 30, 2008	Mount Lemmon	Mount Lemmon Survey	MAR	920 m	MPC · JPL
516710	2008 YX_{80}	—	December 22, 2008	Kitt Peak	Spacewatch	·	1.2 km	MPC · JPL
516711	2008 YK_{136}	—	December 30, 2008	Kitt Peak	Spacewatch	·	1.2 km	MPC · JPL
516712	2008 YA_{175}	—	December 22, 2008	Mount Lemmon	Mount Lemmon Survey	·	1.9 km	MPC · JPL
516713	2009 AP_{11}	—	December 21, 2008	Mount Lemmon	Mount Lemmon Survey	·	1.1 km	MPC · JPL
516714	2009 AE_{31}	—	December 4, 2008	Kitt Peak	Spacewatch	·	1.4 km	MPC · JPL
516715	2009 AV_{32}	—	January 15, 2009	Kitt Peak	Spacewatch	·	1.3 km	MPC · JPL
516716	2009 BU_{1}	—	January 1, 2009	Mount Lemmon	Mount Lemmon Survey	EUN	950 m	MPC · JPL
516717	2009 BK_{10}	—	November 23, 2008	Catalina	CSS	MAR	1.2 km	MPC · JPL
516718	2009 BR_{39}	—	January 16, 2009	Kitt Peak	Spacewatch	MIS	2.2 km	MPC · JPL
516719	2009 BM_{67}	—	January 20, 2009	Kitt Peak	Spacewatch	·	1.4 km	MPC · JPL
516720	2009 BB_{107}	—	January 28, 2009	Catalina	CSS	·	1.4 km	MPC · JPL
516721	2009 BC_{107}	—	December 31, 2008	Mount Lemmon	Mount Lemmon Survey	·	1.6 km	MPC · JPL
516722	2009 BR_{125}	—	March 11, 2005	Mount Lemmon	Mount Lemmon Survey	·	1.0 km	MPC · JPL
516723	2009 BZ_{142}	—	January 30, 2009	Kitt Peak	Spacewatch	·	1.4 km	MPC · JPL
516724	2009 BU_{182}	—	January 18, 2009	Kitt Peak	Spacewatch	·	1.1 km	MPC · JPL
516725	2009 DK_{12}	—	February 20, 2009	Kitt Peak	Spacewatch	T_{j} (2.35)	4.4 km	MPC · JPL
516726	2009 DM_{15}	—	January 19, 2009	Mount Lemmon	Mount Lemmon Survey	·	1.4 km	MPC · JPL
516727	2009 DV_{87}	—	February 27, 2009	Kitt Peak	Spacewatch	·	1.6 km	MPC · JPL
516728	2009 DQ_{88}	—	February 22, 2009	Kitt Peak	Spacewatch	·	1.4 km	MPC · JPL
516729	2009 DR_{129}	—	February 27, 2009	Kitt Peak	Spacewatch	526	1.8 km	MPC · JPL
516730	2009 DS_{138}	—	February 20, 2009	Catalina	CSS	·	1.4 km	MPC · JPL
516731	2009 DZ_{144}	—	February 26, 2009	Kitt Peak	Spacewatch	3:2	5.0 km	MPC · JPL
516732	2009 EN_{5}	—	March 1, 2009	Mount Lemmon	Mount Lemmon Survey	·	1.4 km	MPC · JPL
516733	2009 EC_{7}	—	January 19, 2009	Mount Lemmon	Mount Lemmon Survey	EUN	950 m	MPC · JPL
516734	2009 FG_{1}	—	March 17, 2009	Socorro	LINEAR	APO	550 m	MPC · JPL
516735	2009 FB_{59}	—	March 15, 2009	Kitt Peak	Spacewatch	·	1.7 km	MPC · JPL
516736	2009 FG_{75}	—	March 17, 2009	Kitt Peak	Spacewatch	·	1.9 km	MPC · JPL
516737	2009 GS_{5}	—	April 2, 2009	Kitt Peak	Spacewatch	·	1.6 km	MPC · JPL
516738	2009 HN_{6}	—	April 17, 2009	Kitt Peak	Spacewatch	·	1.8 km	MPC · JPL
516739	2009 HR_{87}	—	March 19, 2009	Kitt Peak	Spacewatch	MRX	1.0 km	MPC · JPL
516740	2009 JW_{8}	—	April 22, 2009	Kitt Peak	Spacewatch	·	1.3 km	MPC · JPL
516741	2009 KF_{30}	—	May 26, 2009	La Sagra	OAM	·	2.0 km	MPC · JPL
516742	2009 QQ_{51}	—	August 28, 2009	Kitt Peak	Spacewatch	·	2.9 km	MPC · JPL
516743	2009 RP	—	August 20, 2009	La Sagra	OAM	·	680 m	MPC · JPL
516744	2009 RM_{13}	—	September 12, 2009	Kitt Peak	Spacewatch	·	700 m	MPC · JPL
516745	2009 RA_{19}	—	September 15, 2009	Kitt Peak	Spacewatch	·	720 m	MPC · JPL
516746	2009 RE_{19}	—	September 15, 2009	Kitt Peak	Spacewatch	T_{j} (2.98)	4.1 km	MPC · JPL
516747	2009 RY_{40}	—	September 15, 2009	Kitt Peak	Spacewatch	·	770 m	MPC · JPL
516748	2009 SK_{24}	—	September 16, 2009	Kitt Peak	Spacewatch	EOS	2.0 km	MPC · JPL
516749	2009 SY_{74}	—	September 17, 2009	Kitt Peak	Spacewatch	·	560 m	MPC · JPL
516750	2009 SO_{135}	—	September 18, 2009	Kitt Peak	Spacewatch	URS	2.4 km	MPC · JPL
516751	2009 SU_{172}	—	September 18, 2009	Kitt Peak	Spacewatch	VER	2.4 km	MPC · JPL
516752	2009 SJ_{242}	—	September 10, 2009	Catalina	CSS	·	660 m	MPC · JPL
516753	2009 SW_{255}	—	August 29, 2009	Kitt Peak	Spacewatch	·	500 m	MPC · JPL
516754	2009 SR_{256}	—	August 29, 2009	Kitt Peak	Spacewatch	·	670 m	MPC · JPL
516755	2009 SO_{267}	—	September 23, 2009	Mount Lemmon	Mount Lemmon Survey	·	1.3 km	MPC · JPL
516756	2009 SZ_{273}	—	September 25, 2009	Kitt Peak	Spacewatch	·	2.3 km	MPC · JPL
516757	2009 SM_{280}	—	September 25, 2009	Kitt Peak	Spacewatch	·	1.7 km	MPC · JPL
516758	2009 SX_{312}	—	September 18, 2009	Kitt Peak	Spacewatch	VER	2.2 km	MPC · JPL
516759	2009 SE_{328}	—	September 26, 2009	Kitt Peak	Spacewatch	·	2.4 km	MPC · JPL
516760	2009 SF_{351}	—	September 29, 2009	Kitt Peak	Spacewatch	·	650 m	MPC · JPL
516761	2009 SX_{352}	—	September 16, 2009	Catalina	CSS	EUP	3.3 km	MPC · JPL
516762	2009 SH_{370}	—	September 21, 2009	Mount Lemmon	Mount Lemmon Survey	V	710 m	MPC · JPL
516763	2009 TN_{21}	—	September 20, 2009	Catalina	CSS	T_{j} (2.97)	5.0 km	MPC · JPL
516764	2009 TC_{31}	—	September 30, 2009	Mount Lemmon	Mount Lemmon Survey	·	800 m	MPC · JPL
516765	2009 TJ_{31}	—	October 15, 2009	Mount Lemmon	Mount Lemmon Survey	·	700 m	MPC · JPL
516766	2009 UZ_{62}	—	March 16, 2007	Mount Lemmon	Mount Lemmon Survey	·	2.5 km	MPC · JPL
516767	2009 US_{66}	—	September 25, 2009	Kitt Peak	Spacewatch	·	4.6 km	MPC · JPL
516768	2009 UO_{140}	—	October 25, 2009	Kitt Peak	Spacewatch	·	1.0 km	MPC · JPL
516769	2009 VE_{95}	—	June 28, 2005	Kitt Peak	Spacewatch	·	710 m	MPC · JPL
516770	2009 VU_{106}	—	September 22, 2009	Mount Lemmon	Mount Lemmon Survey	·	1.6 km	MPC · JPL
516771	2009 VY_{118}	—	November 11, 2009	Mount Lemmon	Mount Lemmon Survey	·	2.1 km	MPC · JPL
516772	2009 WS_{39}	—	October 26, 2009	Mount Lemmon	Mount Lemmon Survey	·	3.7 km	MPC · JPL
516773	2009 WA_{71}	—	October 21, 2009	Mount Lemmon	Mount Lemmon Survey	·	3.0 km	MPC · JPL
516774	2009 WO_{112}	—	November 17, 2009	Kitt Peak	Spacewatch	·	880 m	MPC · JPL
516775	2009 WC_{116}	—	September 19, 2009	Kitt Peak	Spacewatch	VER	2.1 km	MPC · JPL
516776	2009 WS_{127}	—	November 20, 2009	Kitt Peak	Spacewatch	·	870 m	MPC · JPL
516777	2009 WY_{164}	—	October 8, 2005	Kitt Peak	Spacewatch	·	1.4 km	MPC · JPL
516778	2009 WB_{208}	—	October 16, 2009	Mount Lemmon	Mount Lemmon Survey	·	850 m	MPC · JPL
516779	2009 WP_{254}	—	November 10, 2009	Kitt Peak	Spacewatch	NYS	860 m	MPC · JPL
516780	2009 WK_{260}	—	November 24, 2009	Kitt Peak	Spacewatch	V	600 m	MPC · JPL
516781	2009 WY_{269}	—	February 9, 1999	Kitt Peak	Spacewatch	·	2.6 km	MPC · JPL
516782	2009 XZ_{5}	—	December 10, 2009	La Sagra	OAM	·	2.3 km	MPC · JPL
516783	2009 XD_{8}	—	December 12, 1999	Socorro	LINEAR	·	750 m	MPC · JPL
516784	2010 AL_{5}	—	November 4, 2005	Mount Lemmon	Mount Lemmon Survey	·	1.1 km	MPC · JPL
516785	2010 AG_{33}	—	January 7, 2010	Kitt Peak	Spacewatch	·	960 m	MPC · JPL
516786	2010 AO_{123}	—	October 1, 2009	Mount Lemmon	Mount Lemmon Survey	·	2.4 km	MPC · JPL
516787	2010 AQ_{140}	—	October 10, 2008	Mount Lemmon	Mount Lemmon Survey	·	2.7 km	MPC · JPL
516788	2010 BW_{109}	—	January 29, 2010	WISE	WISE	T_{j} (2.97)	6.1 km	MPC · JPL
516789	2010 BH_{120}	—	January 30, 2010	WISE	WISE	·	4.4 km	MPC · JPL
516790	2010 CU_{235}	—	March 2, 2001	Kitt Peak	Spacewatch	·	4.3 km	MPC · JPL
516791	2010 EN_{107}	—	March 12, 2010	Kitt Peak	Spacewatch	H	430 m	MPC · JPL
516792	2010 EW_{135}	—	March 13, 2010	Kitt Peak	Spacewatch	·	1.0 km	MPC · JPL
516793	2010 FB_{91}	—	March 21, 2010	Mount Lemmon	Mount Lemmon Survey	H	450 m	MPC · JPL
516794	2010 GW_{34}	—	April 11, 2010	Mount Lemmon	Mount Lemmon Survey	3:2	4.2 km	MPC · JPL
516795	2010 GZ_{62}	—	April 10, 2010	WISE	WISE	·	1.5 km	MPC · JPL
516796	2010 GO_{126}	—	April 10, 2010	Kitt Peak	Spacewatch	ADE	1.6 km	MPC · JPL
516797	2010 GO_{161}	—	April 12, 2010	Mount Lemmon	Mount Lemmon Survey	·	1.1 km	MPC · JPL
516798	2010 HV_{103}	—	April 26, 2010	Mount Lemmon	Mount Lemmon Survey	·	1.9 km	MPC · JPL
516799	2010 HY_{106}	—	April 9, 2010	Kitt Peak	Spacewatch	MAR	1.0 km	MPC · JPL
516800	2010 JM_{35}	—	September 24, 2008	Mount Lemmon	Mount Lemmon Survey	H	410 m	MPC · JPL

== 516801–516900 ==
back to top

Designation			Discovery			Properties		Ref
Permanent	Provisional	Named after	Date	Site	Discoverer(s)	Category	Diam.	Ref
516801	2010 JL_{36}	—	May 5, 2010	Mount Lemmon	Mount Lemmon Survey	·	1.6 km	MPC · JPL
516802	2010 JA_{82}	—	March 21, 2010	Catalina	CSS	H	510 m	MPC · JPL
516803	2010 JG_{88}	—	May 14, 2010	Catalina	CSS	APO	460 m	MPC · JPL
516804	2010 JN_{176}	—	May 11, 2010	Mount Lemmon	Mount Lemmon Survey	·	1.4 km	MPC · JPL
516805	2010 KU_{20}	—	May 17, 2010	WISE	WISE	·	1.5 km	MPC · JPL
516806	2010 KN_{35}	—	May 19, 2010	WISE	WISE	·	1.2 km	MPC · JPL
516807	2010 KK_{98}	—	May 28, 2010	WISE	WISE	·	2.5 km	MPC · JPL
516808	2010 LW_{60}	—	January 3, 2009	Mount Lemmon	Mount Lemmon Survey	MAR	860 m	MPC · JPL
516809	2010 LC_{119}	—	June 14, 2010	WISE	WISE	·	1.8 km	MPC · JPL
516810	2010 MR_{12}	—	June 17, 2010	WISE	WISE	·	2.1 km	MPC · JPL
516811	2010 MQ_{80}	—	March 8, 2008	Kitt Peak	Spacewatch	NAE	3.5 km	MPC · JPL
516812	2010 NT_{5}	—	July 4, 2010	Kitt Peak	Spacewatch	·	1.6 km	MPC · JPL
516813	2010 NU_{42}	—	July 9, 2010	WISE	WISE	TIN	2.1 km	MPC · JPL
516814	2010 OT_{21}	—	July 18, 2010	WISE	WISE	·	1.9 km	MPC · JPL
516815	2010 OD_{75}	—	July 25, 2010	WISE	WISE	T_{j} (2.98)	3.2 km	MPC · JPL
516816	2010 OG_{79}	—	July 26, 2010	WISE	WISE	EOS	1.7 km	MPC · JPL
516817	2010 OW_{84}	—	April 11, 2010	Mount Lemmon	Mount Lemmon Survey	KON	2.6 km	MPC · JPL
516818	2010 OS_{99}	—	July 28, 2010	WISE	WISE	EUP	3.2 km	MPC · JPL
516819	2010 RT_{42}	—	February 12, 2008	Mount Lemmon	Mount Lemmon Survey	HOF	2.3 km	MPC · JPL
516820	2010 RO_{111}	—	September 11, 2010	Kitt Peak	Spacewatch	EOS	1.8 km	MPC · JPL
516821	2010 RZ_{153}	—	April 15, 2008	Mount Lemmon	Mount Lemmon Survey	EOS	1.5 km	MPC · JPL
516822	2010 RA_{176}	—	September 2, 2010	Mount Lemmon	Mount Lemmon Survey	EOS	1.8 km	MPC · JPL
516823	2010 SY_{23}	—	June 9, 2010	WISE	WISE	·	2.0 km	MPC · JPL
516824	2010 TR_{21}	—	October 6, 2005	Mount Lemmon	Mount Lemmon Survey	TEL	1.2 km	MPC · JPL
516825	2010 TS_{58}	—	June 2, 2005	Siding Spring	SSS	JUN	990 m	MPC · JPL
516826	2010 TC_{67}	—	August 29, 2005	Kitt Peak	Spacewatch	·	2.2 km	MPC · JPL
516827	2010 TM_{105}	—	September 10, 2010	Kitt Peak	Spacewatch	·	1.9 km	MPC · JPL
516828	2010 UX_{10}	—	October 19, 2010	Mount Lemmon	Mount Lemmon Survey	EMA	3.1 km	MPC · JPL
516829	2010 UV_{57}	—	October 29, 2010	Kitt Peak	Spacewatch	·	2.4 km	MPC · JPL
516830	2010 UR_{108}	—	September 29, 2005	Mount Lemmon	Mount Lemmon Survey	KOR	1.1 km	MPC · JPL
516831	2010 VS_{28}	—	November 2, 2010	Mount Lemmon	Mount Lemmon Survey	·	3.1 km	MPC · JPL
516832	2010 VT_{29}	—	September 11, 2010	Mount Lemmon	Mount Lemmon Survey	·	2.8 km	MPC · JPL
516833	2010 VY_{90}	—	August 23, 2004	Kitt Peak	Spacewatch	·	2.2 km	MPC · JPL
516834	2010 VV_{112}	—	October 30, 2010	Kitt Peak	Spacewatch	·	2.4 km	MPC · JPL
516835	2010 WX_{2}	—	November 8, 2010	Kitt Peak	Spacewatch	·	2.0 km	MPC · JPL
516836	2010 WH_{22}	—	October 14, 2010	Mount Lemmon	Mount Lemmon Survey	·	2.8 km	MPC · JPL
516837	2010 WO_{61}	—	November 10, 2010	Mount Lemmon	Mount Lemmon Survey	·	3.1 km	MPC · JPL
516838	2010 XB_{80}	—	November 10, 2010	Kitt Peak	Spacewatch	·	2.6 km	MPC · JPL
516839	2010 YK_{5}	—	September 16, 2009	Catalina	CSS	EOS	2.5 km	MPC · JPL
516840	2011 AG_{31}	—	January 9, 2011	Kitt Peak	Spacewatch	·	3.8 km	MPC · JPL
516841	2011 AC_{37}	—	February 7, 2008	Kitt Peak	Spacewatch	·	610 m	MPC · JPL
516842	2011 BQ_{17}	—	September 19, 2006	Kitt Peak	Spacewatch	·	470 m	MPC · JPL
516843	2011 BA_{103}	—	January 26, 2011	Mount Lemmon	Mount Lemmon Survey	·	800 m	MPC · JPL
516844	2011 BN_{112}	—	September 21, 2009	Kitt Peak	Spacewatch	·	670 m	MPC · JPL
516845	2011 BZ_{122}	—	March 28, 2008	Mount Lemmon	Mount Lemmon Survey	·	530 m	MPC · JPL
516846	2011 BW_{164}	—	January 28, 2011	Kitt Peak	Spacewatch	·	2.7 km	MPC · JPL
516847	2011 BX_{164}	—	February 12, 2011	Mount Lemmon	Mount Lemmon Survey	·	2.1 km	MPC · JPL
516848	2011 BZ_{164}	—	September 7, 2008	Mount Lemmon	Mount Lemmon Survey	EOS	1.4 km	MPC · JPL
516849	2011 BA_{165}	—	February 12, 2011	Mount Lemmon	Mount Lemmon Survey	·	1.3 km	MPC · JPL
516850	2011 CW_{27}	—	February 16, 2001	Kitt Peak	Spacewatch	·	610 m	MPC · JPL
516851	2011 CO_{36}	—	April 3, 2008	Mount Lemmon	Mount Lemmon Survey	·	570 m	MPC · JPL
516852	2011 CM_{47}	—	February 10, 2008	Kitt Peak	Spacewatch	·	620 m	MPC · JPL
516853	2011 DX_{14}	—	September 26, 2009	Kitt Peak	Spacewatch	·	650 m	MPC · JPL
516854	2011 EW_{23}	—	May 13, 2008	Kitt Peak	Spacewatch	·	630 m	MPC · JPL
516855	2011 EC_{25}	—	March 5, 2011	Kitt Peak	Spacewatch	·	650 m	MPC · JPL
516856	2011 ES_{43}	—	February 25, 2011	Kitt Peak	Spacewatch	·	680 m	MPC · JPL
516857	2011 EP_{69}	—	October 11, 2009	Mount Lemmon	Mount Lemmon Survey	·	790 m	MPC · JPL
516858	2011 ED_{70}	—	March 6, 2011	Kitt Peak	Spacewatch	·	540 m	MPC · JPL
516859	2011 ES_{70}	—	March 17, 2004	Kitt Peak	Spacewatch	·	550 m	MPC · JPL
516860	2011 ET_{88}	—	October 30, 2008	Mount Lemmon	Mount Lemmon Survey	·	2.1 km	MPC · JPL
516861	2011 FJ_{11}	—	March 14, 2011	Mount Lemmon	Mount Lemmon Survey	NYS	670 m	MPC · JPL
516862	2011 FA_{19}	—	February 17, 2004	Kitt Peak	Spacewatch	·	660 m	MPC · JPL
516863	2011 FS_{32}	—	March 6, 2011	Kitt Peak	Spacewatch	·	660 m	MPC · JPL
516864	2011 FF_{78}	—	February 23, 2011	Kitt Peak	Spacewatch	·	740 m	MPC · JPL
516865	2011 FK_{134}	—	March 5, 2011	Mount Lemmon	Mount Lemmon Survey	·	570 m	MPC · JPL
516866	2011 GF_{32}	—	January 10, 2007	Mount Lemmon	Mount Lemmon Survey	·	680 m	MPC · JPL
516867	2011 GB_{60}	—	April 1, 2011	Mount Lemmon	Mount Lemmon Survey	NYS	980 m	MPC · JPL
516868	2011 GC_{60}	—	April 8, 2011	Socorro	LINEAR	AMO	540 m	MPC · JPL
516869	2011 HD_{8}	—	April 4, 2011	Kitt Peak	Spacewatch	·	750 m	MPC · JPL
516870	2011 HC_{13}	—	March 1, 2011	Mount Lemmon	Mount Lemmon Survey	·	770 m	MPC · JPL
516871	2011 HA_{17}	—	March 1, 2011	Mount Lemmon	Mount Lemmon Survey	·	630 m	MPC · JPL
516872	2011 HU_{17}	—	November 11, 2009	Mount Lemmon	Mount Lemmon Survey	·	670 m	MPC · JPL
516873	2011 HT_{28}	—	March 1, 2011	Mount Lemmon	Mount Lemmon Survey	·	860 m	MPC · JPL
516874	2011 HZ_{32}	—	April 27, 2011	Kitt Peak	Spacewatch	·	770 m	MPC · JPL
516875	2011 HR_{33}	—	April 27, 2011	Haleakala	Pan-STARRS 1	·	610 m	MPC · JPL
516876	2011 HM_{39}	—	September 22, 2008	Kitt Peak	Spacewatch	·	970 m	MPC · JPL
516877	2011 HL_{64}	—	April 24, 2004	Kitt Peak	Spacewatch	·	640 m	MPC · JPL
516878	2011 HU_{66}	—	April 22, 2011	Kitt Peak	Spacewatch	·	790 m	MPC · JPL
516879	2011 HZ_{66}	—	April 23, 2011	Kitt Peak	Spacewatch	·	940 m	MPC · JPL
516880	2011 HS_{70}	—	April 24, 2011	Mount Lemmon	Mount Lemmon Survey	·	810 m	MPC · JPL
516881	2011 JK_{32}	—	May 12, 2011	Mount Lemmon	Mount Lemmon Survey	·	1.9 km	MPC · JPL
516882	2011 KU_{13}	—	May 23, 2011	Mount Lemmon	Mount Lemmon Survey	H	520 m	MPC · JPL
516883	2011 KP_{28}	—	February 17, 2007	Kitt Peak	Spacewatch	·	910 m	MPC · JPL
516884	2011 KJ_{45}	—	March 16, 2007	Mount Lemmon	Mount Lemmon Survey	MAS	520 m	MPC · JPL
516885	2011 KE_{49}	—	May 21, 2011	Haleakala	Pan-STARRS 1	·	950 m	MPC · JPL
516886	2011 LJ_{13}	—	October 6, 2008	Mount Lemmon	Mount Lemmon Survey	NYS	740 m	MPC · JPL
516887	2011 MQ_{5}	—	March 25, 2007	Mount Lemmon	Mount Lemmon Survey	PHO	770 m	MPC · JPL
516888	2011 OD_{12}	—	June 27, 2011	Kitt Peak	Spacewatch	·	1.1 km	MPC · JPL
516889	2011 OC_{19}	—	June 26, 2011	Mount Lemmon	Mount Lemmon Survey	·	1.1 km	MPC · JPL
516890	2011 OZ_{19}	—	July 22, 2011	Haleakala	Pan-STARRS 1	·	1.1 km	MPC · JPL
516891	2011 OW_{42}	—	June 22, 2011	Mount Lemmon	Mount Lemmon Survey	NYS	1.0 km	MPC · JPL
516892	2011 OE_{43}	—	May 29, 2010	WISE	WISE	PHO	2.1 km	MPC · JPL
516893	2011 QO_{20}	—	June 14, 2010	WISE	WISE	·	870 m	MPC · JPL
516894	2011 RX_{17}	—	September 4, 2011	Haleakala	Pan-STARRS 1	·	1.3 km	MPC · JPL
516895	2011 RP_{18}	—	February 26, 2009	Kitt Peak	Spacewatch	·	1.8 km	MPC · JPL
516896	2011 RP_{20}	—	December 31, 2008	Mount Lemmon	Mount Lemmon Survey	·	870 m	MPC · JPL
516897	2011 SF_{38}	—	October 18, 2003	Kitt Peak	Spacewatch	H	430 m	MPC · JPL
516898	2011 SO_{70}	—	September 24, 2011	Haleakala	Pan-STARRS 1	H	440 m	MPC · JPL
516899	2011 SG_{71}	—	September 4, 2011	Haleakala	Pan-STARRS 1	·	1.5 km	MPC · JPL
516900	2011 ST_{89}	—	September 22, 2011	Kitt Peak	Spacewatch	HNS	1.2 km	MPC · JPL

== 516901–517000 ==
back to top

Designation			Discovery			Properties		Ref
Permanent	Provisional	Named after	Date	Site	Discoverer(s)	Category	Diam.	Ref
516901	2011 SW_{138}	—	September 12, 2007	Mount Lemmon	Mount Lemmon Survey	·	890 m	MPC · JPL
516902	2011 SM_{205}	—	September 2, 2011	Haleakala	Pan-STARRS 1	H	290 m	MPC · JPL
516903	2011 ST_{222}	—	September 27, 2011	Mount Lemmon	Mount Lemmon Survey	H	480 m	MPC · JPL
516904	2011 SP_{259}	—	September 27, 2011	Mount Lemmon	Mount Lemmon Survey	GAL	1.4 km	MPC · JPL
516905	2011 SO_{260}	—	September 30, 2011	Kitt Peak	Spacewatch	·	1.4 km	MPC · JPL
516906	2011 SN_{278}	—	November 5, 2007	Mount Lemmon	Mount Lemmon Survey	·	1.3 km	MPC · JPL
516907	2011 UM_{20}	—	December 11, 2006	Socorro	LINEAR	H	540 m	MPC · JPL
516908	2011 UX_{57}	—	October 8, 2007	Mount Lemmon	Mount Lemmon Survey	(5)	1.1 km	MPC · JPL
516909	2011 UN_{75}	—	September 30, 2011	Kitt Peak	Spacewatch	·	1.8 km	MPC · JPL
516910	2011 UE_{99}	—	October 20, 2011	Mount Lemmon	Mount Lemmon Survey	·	1.4 km	MPC · JPL
516911	2011 UG_{109}	—	November 17, 2007	Mount Lemmon	Mount Lemmon Survey	·	1.1 km	MPC · JPL
516912	2011 UJ_{181}	—	October 24, 2011	Haleakala	Pan-STARRS 1	·	2.1 km	MPC · JPL
516913	2011 US_{183}	—	April 14, 2010	Mount Lemmon	Mount Lemmon Survey	H	530 m	MPC · JPL
516914	2011 UN_{241}	—	October 25, 2011	Haleakala	Pan-STARRS 1	WIT	1.0 km	MPC · JPL
516915	2011 UU_{246}	—	September 27, 2011	Mount Lemmon	Mount Lemmon Survey	·	1.6 km	MPC · JPL
516916	2011 UH_{253}	—	October 26, 2011	Haleakala	Pan-STARRS 1	·	1.3 km	MPC · JPL
516917	2011 UU_{253}	—	October 26, 2011	Haleakala	Pan-STARRS 1	·	1.4 km	MPC · JPL
516918	2011 UG_{258}	—	October 20, 2006	Kitt Peak	Spacewatch	·	1.4 km	MPC · JPL
516919	2011 UA_{266}	—	October 21, 2011	Mount Lemmon	Mount Lemmon Survey	EUN	990 m	MPC · JPL
516920	2011 UY_{270}	—	September 26, 2011	Kitt Peak	Spacewatch	H	520 m	MPC · JPL
516921	2011 UK_{300}	—	October 19, 2011	Mount Lemmon	Mount Lemmon Survey	·	1.6 km	MPC · JPL
516922	2011 UM_{333}	—	September 25, 2011	Haleakala	Pan-STARRS 1	·	1.1 km	MPC · JPL
516923	2011 UL_{396}	—	October 29, 2011	Haleakala	Pan-STARRS 1	·	2.0 km	MPC · JPL
516924	2011 UL_{414}	—	October 25, 2011	Haleakala	Pan-STARRS 1	·	1.4 km	MPC · JPL
516925	2011 UX_{414}	—	December 16, 2006	Mount Lemmon	Mount Lemmon Survey	·	2.9 km	MPC · JPL
516926	2011 UY_{414}	—	November 24, 2008	Mount Lemmon	Mount Lemmon Survey	·	670 m	MPC · JPL
516927	2011 WY_{2}	—	November 16, 2011	Kitt Peak	Spacewatch	·	1.9 km	MPC · JPL
516928	2011 WZ_{105}	—	November 24, 2011	Haleakala	Pan-STARRS 1	·	2.7 km	MPC · JPL
516929	2011 WJ_{128}	—	January 15, 2007	Mount Lemmon	Mount Lemmon Survey	H	570 m	MPC · JPL
516930	2011 WQ_{134}	—	November 20, 2011	Haleakala	Pan-STARRS 1	H	720 m	MPC · JPL
516931	2011 WS_{134}	—	April 14, 2010	Mount Lemmon	Mount Lemmon Survey	H	610 m	MPC · JPL
516932	2011 YK_{27}	—	December 27, 2011	Mount Lemmon	Mount Lemmon Survey	·	2.5 km	MPC · JPL
516933	2011 YA_{77}	—	October 11, 2010	Mount Lemmon	Mount Lemmon Survey	·	1.8 km	MPC · JPL
516934	2012 AY_{10}	—	January 14, 2012	Haleakala	Pan-STARRS 1	H	670 m	MPC · JPL
516935	2012 AM_{13}	—	June 18, 2010	WISE	WISE	·	3.8 km	MPC · JPL
516936	2012 AX_{24}	—	May 17, 2009	Mount Lemmon	Mount Lemmon Survey	·	1.7 km	MPC · JPL
516937	2012 BB	—	July 24, 2010	WISE	WISE	·	3.7 km	MPC · JPL
516938	2012 BE_{3}	—	December 28, 2011	Mount Lemmon	Mount Lemmon Survey	·	3.2 km	MPC · JPL
516939	2012 BS_{57}	—	January 2, 2012	Kitt Peak	Spacewatch	·	1.7 km	MPC · JPL
516940	2012 BX_{69}	—	May 31, 2008	Kitt Peak	Spacewatch	·	2.5 km	MPC · JPL
516941	2012 BO_{70}	—	January 21, 2012	Kitt Peak	Spacewatch	·	2.3 km	MPC · JPL
516942	2012 BE_{71}	—	November 26, 2011	Mount Lemmon	Mount Lemmon Survey	·	2.5 km	MPC · JPL
516943	2012 BB_{81}	—	January 18, 2012	Kitt Peak	Spacewatch	·	1.7 km	MPC · JPL
516944	2012 BD_{94}	—	September 10, 2010	Mount Lemmon	Mount Lemmon Survey	·	2.3 km	MPC · JPL
516945	2012 BA_{101}	—	December 25, 2005	Kitt Peak	Spacewatch	·	2.5 km	MPC · JPL
516946	2012 BH_{111}	—	September 29, 2010	Mount Lemmon	Mount Lemmon Survey	·	2.0 km	MPC · JPL
516947	2012 BK_{112}	—	January 27, 2012	Kitt Peak	Spacewatch	·	2.7 km	MPC · JPL
516948	2012 BK_{142}	—	November 29, 2005	Kitt Peak	Spacewatch	TIR	2.2 km	MPC · JPL
516949	2012 BZ_{155}	—	January 19, 2012	Kitt Peak	Spacewatch	·	1.6 km	MPC · JPL
516950	2012 BL_{156}	—	January 19, 2012	Haleakala	Pan-STARRS 1	VER	2.6 km	MPC · JPL
516951	2012 BG_{157}	—	January 20, 2012	Kitt Peak	Spacewatch	·	2.5 km	MPC · JPL
516952	2012 CX_{8}	—	February 3, 2012	Haleakala	Pan-STARRS 1	EOS	1.6 km	MPC · JPL
516953	2012 CX_{15}	—	January 27, 2012	Mount Lemmon	Mount Lemmon Survey	EOS	1.4 km	MPC · JPL
516954	2012 CV_{30}	—	January 21, 2012	Kitt Peak	Spacewatch	·	2.0 km	MPC · JPL
516955	2012 CY_{51}	—	January 19, 2012	Haleakala	Pan-STARRS 1	·	2.4 km	MPC · JPL
516956	2012 DO_{6}	—	October 27, 2005	Kitt Peak	Spacewatch	·	2.4 km	MPC · JPL
516957	2012 DS_{20}	—	January 19, 2012	Haleakala	Pan-STARRS 1	EOS	2.3 km	MPC · JPL
516958	2012 DZ_{24}	—	February 21, 2012	Kitt Peak	Spacewatch	·	2.5 km	MPC · JPL
516959	2012 DV_{36}	—	January 19, 2012	Haleakala	Pan-STARRS 1	·	3.4 km	MPC · JPL
516960	2012 DX_{45}	—	February 26, 2012	Kitt Peak	Spacewatch	·	2.8 km	MPC · JPL
516961	2012 DE_{48}	—	February 25, 2012	Kitt Peak	Spacewatch	·	3.0 km	MPC · JPL
516962	2012 DL_{71}	—	January 25, 2006	Kitt Peak	Spacewatch	·	2.9 km	MPC · JPL
516963	2012 DE_{90}	—	August 7, 2010	WISE	WISE	·	3.8 km	MPC · JPL
516964	2012 DS_{90}	—	September 18, 2009	Mount Lemmon	Mount Lemmon Survey	·	2.0 km	MPC · JPL
516965	2012 DR_{94}	—	January 19, 2012	Haleakala	Pan-STARRS 1	HYG	2.2 km	MPC · JPL
516966	2012 DO_{101}	—	September 15, 2009	Kitt Peak	Spacewatch	EOS	1.6 km	MPC · JPL
516967	2012 EL_{2}	—	February 13, 2012	Haleakala	Pan-STARRS 1	TIR	2.6 km	MPC · JPL
516968	2012 FO_{38}	—	February 23, 2012	Catalina	CSS	·	3.4 km	MPC · JPL
516969	2012 FN_{65}	—	February 24, 2012	Kitt Peak	Spacewatch	·	3.5 km	MPC · JPL
516970	2012 FU_{65}	—	March 3, 2006	Kitt Peak	Spacewatch	·	2.6 km	MPC · JPL
516971	2012 FQ_{75}	—	January 22, 2006	Catalina	CSS	·	3.4 km	MPC · JPL
516972	2012 FG_{85}	—	March 27, 2012	Kitt Peak	Spacewatch	·	1.4 km	MPC · JPL
516973	2012 FH_{85}	—	March 29, 2012	Kitt Peak	Spacewatch	·	1.1 km	MPC · JPL
516974	2012 GJ_{21}	—	April 15, 2012	Haleakala	Pan-STARRS 1	·	3.1 km	MPC · JPL
516975	2012 GG_{41}	—	April 15, 2012	Haleakala	Pan-STARRS 1	·	2.5 km	MPC · JPL
516976	2012 HM_{1}	—	April 16, 2012	Haleakala	Pan-STARRS 1	AMO	190 m	MPC · JPL
516977	2012 HZ_{84}	—	April 17, 2012	Las Campanas	New Horizons KBO Search	res · 9:11	60 km	MPC · JPL
516978	2012 JL_{6}	—	May 12, 2012	Mount Lemmon	Mount Lemmon Survey	·	1.2 km	MPC · JPL
516979	2012 JH_{37}	—	September 19, 2003	Kitt Peak	Spacewatch	·	610 m	MPC · JPL
516980	2012 KJ_{1}	—	January 16, 2005	Mauna Kea	Veillet, C.	·	1.1 km	MPC · JPL
516981	2012 KD_{52}	—	October 30, 2008	Mount Lemmon	Mount Lemmon Survey	ADE	2.0 km	MPC · JPL
516982	2012 OO_{6}	—	November 7, 2008	Mount Lemmon	Mount Lemmon Survey	·	3.6 km	MPC · JPL
516983	2012 PM_{1}	—	March 1, 2011	Kitt Peak	Spacewatch	·	970 m	MPC · JPL
516984	2012 PN_{28}	—	July 7, 2010	WISE	WISE	APO +1km	1.8 km	MPC · JPL
516985	2012 PS_{44}	—	October 3, 2003	Kitt Peak	Spacewatch	·	1.6 km	MPC · JPL
516986	2012 QP_{10}	—	August 19, 2012	Siding Spring	SSS	AMO	450 m	MPC · JPL
516987	2012 QE_{43}	—	April 5, 2011	Mount Lemmon	Mount Lemmon Survey	V	560 m	MPC · JPL
516988	2012 QY_{52}	—	August 26, 2012	Haleakala	Pan-STARRS 1	·	1.1 km	MPC · JPL
516989	2012 QZ_{52}	—	November 8, 2008	Mount Lemmon	Mount Lemmon Survey	·	1.6 km	MPC · JPL
516990	2012 QC_{53}	—	April 6, 2011	Kitt Peak	Spacewatch	·	1.3 km	MPC · JPL
516991	2012 RN_{14}	—	September 6, 2002	Socorro	LINEAR	·	720 m	MPC · JPL
516992	2012 RS_{37}	—	June 19, 1998	Caussols	ODAS	·	900 m	MPC · JPL
516993	2012 RC_{41}	—	September 15, 2012	Catalina	CSS	·	820 m	MPC · JPL
516994	2012 RL_{43}	—	August 13, 2012	Kitt Peak	Spacewatch	·	780 m	MPC · JPL
516995	2012 SF_{28}	—	April 6, 2008	Mount Lemmon	Mount Lemmon Survey	·	570 m	MPC · JPL
516996	2012 SH_{33}	—	March 14, 2011	Mount Lemmon	Mount Lemmon Survey	·	760 m	MPC · JPL
516997	2012 SD_{69}	—	November 1, 2008	Mount Lemmon	Mount Lemmon Survey	·	1.3 km	MPC · JPL
516998	2012 SP_{69}	—	March 26, 2007	Mount Lemmon	Mount Lemmon Survey	·	1.1 km	MPC · JPL
516999	2012 TY_{24}	—	October 15, 2001	Kitt Peak	Spacewatch	·	1 km	MPC · JPL
517000	2012 TR_{25}	—	October 4, 2012	Mount Lemmon	Mount Lemmon Survey	·	1.2 km	MPC · JPL

back to top

== Meaning of names ==
As minor planet discoveries are confirmed, they are given a permanent number by the IAU's Minor Planet Center (MPC), and the discoverers can then submit names for them, following the IAU's naming conventions. The list below concerns those minor planets in the specified number-range that have received names, and explains the meanings of those names.

Official naming citations of newly named small Solar System bodies are approved and published in a bulletin by IAU's Working Group for Small Bodies Nomenclature (WGSBN). Before May 2021, citations were published in MPC's Minor Planet Circulars for many decades. Recent citations can also be found on the JPL Small-Body Database (SBDB). Until his death in 2016, German astronomer Lutz D. Schmadel compiled these citations into the Dictionary of Minor Planet Names (DMP) and regularly updated the collection.

Based on Paul Herget's The Names of the Minor Planets, Schmadel also researched the unclear origin of numerous asteroids, most of which had been named prior to World War II. This article incorporates text from this source, which is in the public domain: SBDB New namings may only be added to this list below after official publication as the preannouncement of names is condemned. The WGSBN publishes a comprehensive guideline for the naming rules of non-cometary small Solar System bodies.

Named minor planet	Provisional	This minor planet was named for...	Ref · Catalog
516560 Annapolisroyal	2006 XL_{67}	The town of Annapolis Royal, Nova Scotia, is recognized as the cradle of the Canadian nation for its prominent role in the country's early origins and remains influential as a leader in heritage stewardship and preservation.	JPL · 516560
