= 2012 HE85 =

Trans-Neptunian object

2012 HE_{85}
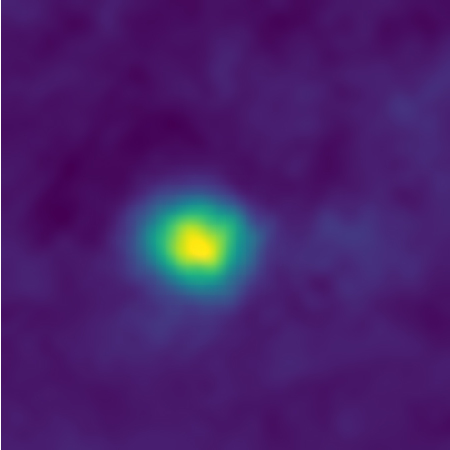
- False-color image of 2012 HE_{85} taken by New Horizons in December 2017

Discovery
- Discovered by: New Horizons KBO Search
- Discovery site: Las Campanas Obs.
- Discovery date: 18 April 2012 (first observed only)

Designations
- Alternative designations: VNH0021
- Minor planet category: TNO; KBO; res 5:9; distant

Orbital characteristics
- Epoch 27 April 2019 (JD 2458600.5)
- Uncertainty parameter 3
- Observation arc: 5.18 yr (1,892 d)
- Aphelion: 49.639 AU
- Perihelion: 40.156 AU
- Semi-major axis: 44.897 AU
- Eccentricity: 0.1056
- Orbital period (sidereal): 300.84 yr (109,882 d)
- Mean anomaly: 12.220°
- Mean motion: 0° 0^{m} 11.88^{s} / day
- Inclination: 3.0161°
- Longitude of ascending node: 234.99°
- Argument of perihelion: 37.770°

Physical characteristics
- Mean diameter: 31 km (est. at 0.15); 74 km (est. at 0.09)
- Absolute magnitude (H): 8.9

2012 HE_{85} is a small, resonant trans-Neptunian object from the Kuiper belt, located in the outermost region of the Solar System, approximately 74 kilometers (46 miles) in diameter. It was first observed by a team of astronomers using one of the Magellan Telescopes in Chile during the New Horizons KBO Search on 18 April 2012, in order to find a potential flyby target for the New Horizons spacecraft. The likely 5:9 resonant object was imaged by the spacecraft from afar at a record distance from Earth in 2017.

== Orbit and classification ==
The Kuiper belt object is considered to be a resonant trans-Neptunian object in a higher 5:9 orbital resonance with the ice giant Neptune. It orbits the Sun at a distance of 40.2–49.6 AU once every 300 years and 10 months (semi-major axis of 44.9 AU). Its orbit has an eccentricity of 0.11 and an inclination of 3° with respect to the ecliptic. The body's observation arc begins with its official first observation by David Osip, Paul Schechter, David Borncamp, Susan Benecchi and Scott Sheppard of the New Horizons KBO Search (268) using the Magellan II (Clay) telescope at the Las Campanas Observatory, located in the Atacama desert in Chile.

== Milestone image ==
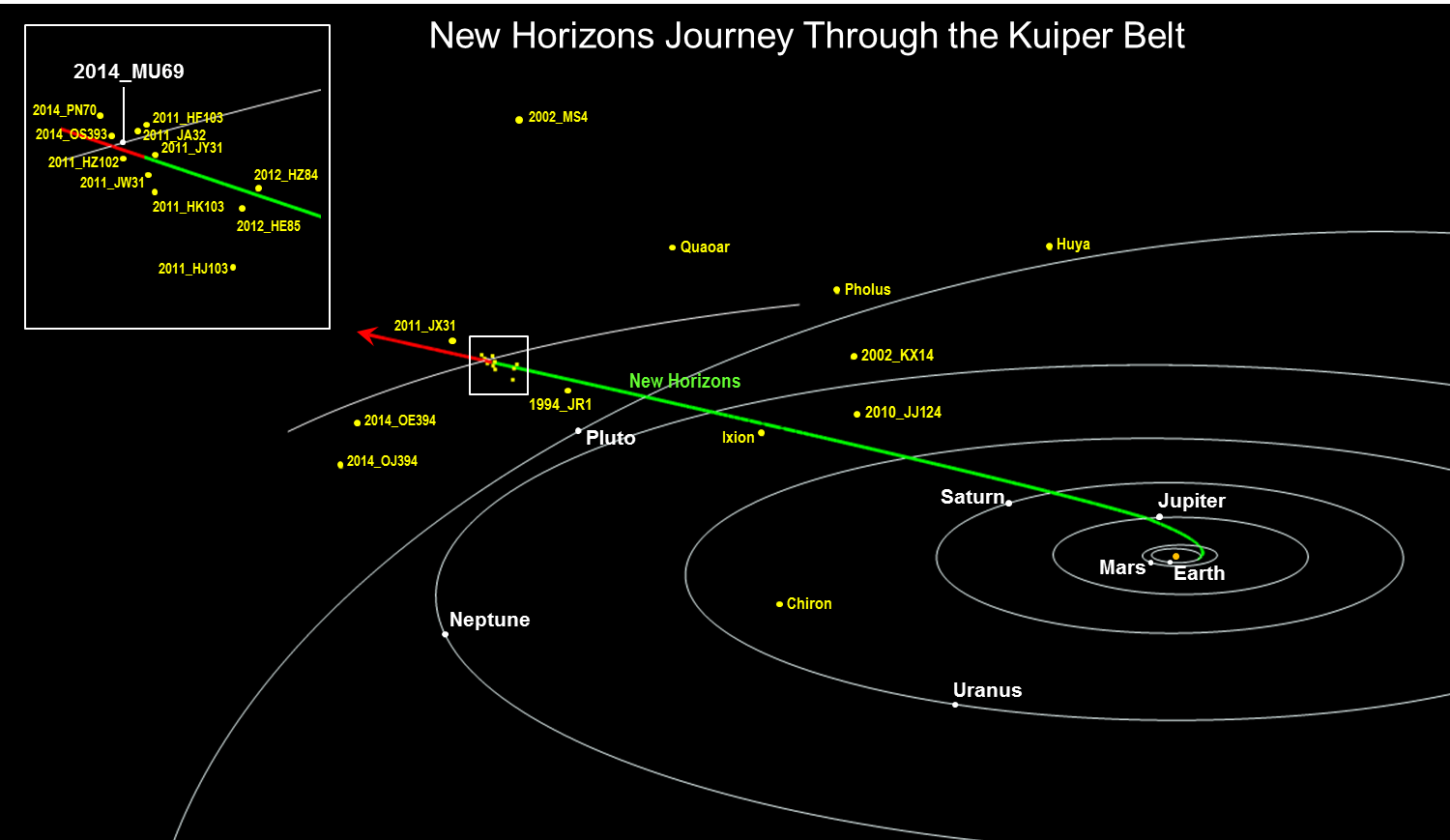
Trajectory of New Horizons and other nearby Kuiper belt objects

When the New Horizons spacecraft imaged 2012 HE_{85} in 2017, it was the farthest from Earth ever captured by a spacecraft. The image was taken by the spacecraft's Long Range Reconnaissance Imager (LORRI) on 5 December 2017 at more than 6.12 billion kilometers (40.9 AU) away from Earth. This record was previously held by the Voyager 1 spacecraft which took the iconic Pale Blue Dot image at 6.06 billion kilometers from Earth in February 1990.

In December 2017, New Horizons also imaged the classical Kuiper belt object (516977) 2012 HZ84, which was discovered by the same team of astronomers the night before they first observed 2012 HE_{85}. Both objects held this record for little more than one year, until it was superseded on New Year's Eve 2018/19, when New Horizons made its close flyby on 486958 Arrokoth at a new record distance of 6.4 billion kilometers from Earth.

== Physical characteristics ==
According to Johnston's Archive, the object measures 74 kilometers in diameter based on an assumed albedo of 0.09 and an absolute magnitude of 8.9. Another estimates gives a smaller diameter of 31 kilometers due to an assumed albedo of 0.15. As of 2019, no rotational lightcurve of 2012 HE_{85} has been obtained from photometric observations. The body's rotation period, pole and shape remain unknown.

== Numbering and naming ==
As of 2025, this minor planet has neither been numbered nor named by the Minor Planet Center.
