= Meanings of minor-planet names: 146001–147000 =

As minor planet discoveries are confirmed, they are given a permanent number by the IAU's Minor Planet Center (MPC), and the discoverers can then submit names for them, following the IAU's naming conventions. The list below concerns those minor planets in the specified number-range that have received names, and explains the meanings of those names.

Official naming citations of newly named small Solar System bodies are approved and published in a bulletin by IAU's Working Group for Small Bodies Nomenclature (WGSBN). Before May 2021, citations were published in MPC's Minor Planet Circulars for many decades. Recent citations can also be found on the JPL Small-Body Database (SBDB). Until his death in 2016, German astronomer Lutz D. Schmadel compiled these citations into the Dictionary of Minor Planet Names (DMP) and regularly updated the collection.

Based on Paul Herget's The Names of the Minor Planets, Schmadel also researched the unclear origin of numerous asteroids, most of which had been named prior to World War II. This article incorporates text from this source, which is in the public domain: SBDB New namings may only be added to this list below after official publication as the preannouncement of names is condemned. The WGSBN publishes a comprehensive guideline for the naming rules of non-cometary small Solar System bodies.

== 146001–146100 ==
| Named minor planet | Provisional | This minor planet was named for... | Ref · Catalog |
|---|---|---|---|
| 146040 Alicebowman | 2000 DV_{114} | Alice Bowman (born 1960) is a group supervisor at the Johns Hopkins University Applied Physics Laboratory. She served as the Mission Operations Manager for the New Horizons Mission to Pluto. | JPL · 146040 |

== 146101–146200 ==
back to top

| Named minor planet | Provisional | This minor planet was named for... | Ref · Catalog |
|---|---|---|---|
There are no named minor planets in this number range

== 146201–146300 ==
back to top

| Named minor planet | Provisional | This minor planet was named for... | Ref · Catalog |
|---|---|---|---|
| 146268 Jennipolakis | 2001 DQ | Jennifer Polakis (born 1959), American amateur astronomer, eclipse chaser and popularizer of astronomy | JPL · 146268 |

== 146301–146400 ==
back to top

| Named minor planet | Provisional | This minor planet was named for... | Ref · Catalog |
|---|---|---|---|
There are no named minor planets in this number range

== 146401–146500 ==
back to top

| Named minor planet | Provisional | This minor planet was named for... | Ref · Catalog |
|---|---|---|---|
| 146442 Dwaynebrown | 2001 QS_{320} | Dwayne C. Brown (born 1960), the Public Affairs Officer for the New Horizons mission to Pluto | JPL · 146442 |

== 146501–146600 ==
back to top

| Named minor planet | Provisional | This minor planet was named for... | Ref · Catalog |
|---|---|---|---|
There are no named minor planets in this number range

== 146601–146700 ==
back to top

| Named minor planet | Provisional | This minor planet was named for... | Ref · Catalog |
|---|---|---|---|
There are no named minor planets in this number range

== 146701–146800 ==
back to top

| Named minor planet | Provisional | This minor planet was named for... | Ref · Catalog |
|---|---|---|---|
There are no named minor planets in this number range

== 146801–146900 ==
back to top

| Named minor planet | Provisional | This minor planet was named for... | Ref · Catalog |
|---|---|---|---|
There are no named minor planets in this number range

== 146901–147000 ==
back to top

| Named minor planet | Provisional | This minor planet was named for... | Ref · Catalog |
|---|---|---|---|
| 146921 Michaelbuckley | 2002 CU_{250} | Michael R. Buckley (born 1969) is a senior public affairs specialist at the Johns Hopkins University Applied Physics Laboratory. He served as the Public Affairs Officer for the New Horizons mission to Pluto. | JPL · 146921 |
| 146985 Yakelinromero | 2002 PM_{11} | Yakelin Lizbeth Romero Triviños, Peruvian software engineer. | JPL · 146985 |

back to top

| Preceded by 145,001–146,000 | Meanings of minor-planet names List of minor planets: 146,001–147,000 | Succeeded by 147,001–148,000 |
