= Alice Bowman =

American engineering manager (born 1960)

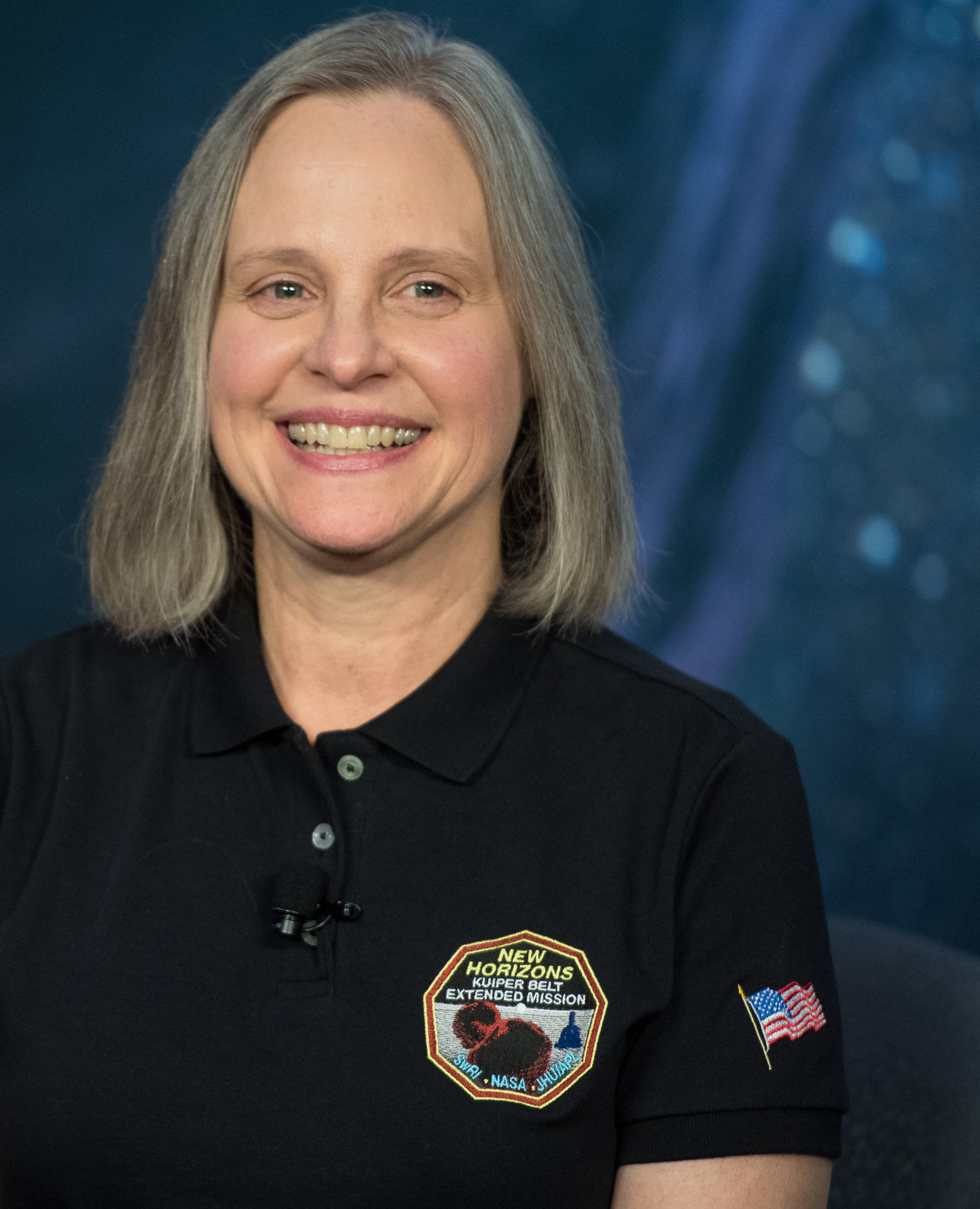
- Alice Bowman during the New Horizons extended mission in 2019
- Born: 1960 (age 65–66); Richmond, Virginia
- Education: BA, physics and chemistry, University of Virginia
- Known for: Mission Operations Manager for the New Horizons mission to Pluto
- Children: Noah Carter Bowman
- Scientific career
- Institutions: Applied Physics Laboratory, Howard County, Maryland

Alice Bowman (born 1960) is the Mission Operations Manager for the New Horizons mission to Pluto. She is the first woman to fill that role at the Applied Physics Laboratory, taking on the position in 2002 specifically for the duration of the three billion-mile space journey.

== Early life and education ==
Bowman grew up in Richmond, Virginia. She was influenced at an early age by the Gemini program, and in 1969 she watched the Apollo 11 Moon landing. Bowman originally majored in physics and chemistry in college, gaining a BA from the University of Virginia.

== Career ==
She first worked in the defense industry analyzing infrared detectors and developing anti-cancer drugs. She entered the Applied Physics Laboratory as an engineer, intending to work on tracking incoming ballistic missiles.

A member of the principal professional staff at the APL, she is supervisor of the university's own Space Mission Operation Group and Mission Operations Manager (MOM) of the Mission Operations Centre on the New Horizons project. This title is one, it has been suggested, that male personnel refer to traditionally as "Ops manager"; but Bowman, as "a physicist, space commander and parent, embraces the broader term" of MOM. Bowman leads a team of approximately 40 people, and personally assesses every piece of information the centre sends to the space crew before it dispatches. Ten days before the eventual Pluto-encounter day, that entailed over 20,000 commands. She has compared the levels of accuracy required to achieving a hole in one in golf.

== Memberships ==
Bowman is an Associate Fellow of the American Institute of Aeronautics and Astronautics and the International SpaceOps Committee.

== Awards and honors ==
Asteroid 146040 Alicebowman, discovered by Marc Buie at the Kitt Peak National Observatory in 2000, was named after her. The official naming citation was published by the Minor Planet Center on 11 July 2018 (M.P.C. 110636).

== Personal life ==
She is married with one son, and for leisure plays the clarinet and bass, with a particular interest in bluegrass music.
