= List of minor planets: 146001–147000 =

The following is a partial list of minor planets, running from minor-planet number 146001 through 147000, inclusive. The primary data for this and other partial lists is based on JPL's "Small-Body Orbital Elements" and data available from the Minor Planet Center. Critical list information is also provided by the MPC, unless otherwise specified from Lowell Observatory. A detailed description of the table's columns and additional sources are given on the main page including a complete list of every page in this series, and a statistical break-up on the dynamical classification of minor planets.

Also see the summary list of all named bodies in numerical and alphabetical order, and the corresponding naming citations for the number range of this particular list. New namings may only be added to this list after official publication, as the preannouncement of names is condemned by the Working Group for Small Bodies Nomenclature of the International Astronomical Union.

Near-Earth obj.	MBA (inner)	MBA (outer)	Centaur
Mars-crosser	MBA (middle)	Jupiter trojan	Trans-Neptunian obj.
Unclassified

== 146001–146100 ==
Designation			Discovery			Properties		Ref
Permanent	Provisional	Named after	Date	Site	Discoverer(s)	Category	Diam.	Ref
146001	2000 CK_{42}	—	February 2, 2000	Socorro	LINEAR	·	1.7 km	MPC · JPL
146002	2000 CT_{42}	—	February 2, 2000	Socorro	LINEAR	V	1.2 km	MPC · JPL
146003	2000 CT_{52}	—	February 2, 2000	Socorro	LINEAR	NYS	2.1 km	MPC · JPL
146004	2000 CN_{55}	—	February 4, 2000	Socorro	LINEAR	·	1.8 km	MPC · JPL
146005	2000 CE_{56}	—	February 4, 2000	Socorro	LINEAR	·	1.7 km	MPC · JPL
146006	2000 CR_{64}	—	February 3, 2000	Socorro	LINEAR	·	2.9 km	MPC · JPL
146007	2000 CA_{67}	—	February 6, 2000	Socorro	LINEAR	ERI	3.5 km	MPC · JPL
146008	2000 CY_{74}	—	February 2, 2000	Uenohara	N. Kawasato	NYS	1.4 km	MPC · JPL
146009	2000 CR_{76}	—	February 10, 2000	Višnjan Observatory	K. Korlević	MAS	1.4 km	MPC · JPL
146010	2000 CN_{78}	—	February 8, 2000	Kitt Peak	Spacewatch	·	1.4 km	MPC · JPL
146011	2000 CM_{84}	—	February 4, 2000	Socorro	LINEAR	·	1.6 km	MPC · JPL
146012	2000 CK_{89}	—	February 4, 2000	Socorro	LINEAR	·	2.3 km	MPC · JPL
146013	2000 CO_{98}	—	February 8, 2000	Kitt Peak	Spacewatch	·	1.4 km	MPC · JPL
146014	2000 CD_{104}	—	February 12, 2000	Socorro	LINEAR	HIL · 3:2	10 km	MPC · JPL
146015	2000 CV_{111}	—	February 6, 2000	Socorro	LINEAR	·	1.5 km	MPC · JPL
146016	2000 CS_{115}	—	February 1, 2000	Catalina	CSS	NYS	1.7 km	MPC · JPL
146017	2000 CX_{120}	—	February 5, 2000	San Marcello	A. Boattini, L. Tesi	·	1.8 km	MPC · JPL
146018	2000 CB_{121}	—	February 2, 2000	Socorro	LINEAR	·	1.7 km	MPC · JPL
146019	2000 CM_{138}	—	February 5, 2000	Kitt Peak	Spacewatch	·	1.6 km	MPC · JPL
146020	2000 CA_{144}	—	February 5, 2000	Kitt Peak	Spacewatch	·	1.1 km	MPC · JPL
146021	2000 DB_{4}	—	February 28, 2000	Socorro	LINEAR	·	1.9 km	MPC · JPL
146022	2000 DF_{5}	—	February 28, 2000	Socorro	LINEAR	NYS	2.2 km	MPC · JPL
146023	2000 DX_{25}	—	February 29, 2000	Socorro	LINEAR	NYS	2.2 km	MPC · JPL
146024	2000 DS_{26}	—	February 29, 2000	Socorro	LINEAR	·	1.6 km	MPC · JPL
146025	2000 DY_{29}	—	February 29, 2000	Socorro	LINEAR	MAS	1.1 km	MPC · JPL
146026	2000 DJ_{40}	—	February 29, 2000	Socorro	LINEAR	·	2.1 km	MPC · JPL
146027	2000 DC_{60}	—	February 29, 2000	Socorro	LINEAR	MAS	1.1 km	MPC · JPL
146028	2000 DG_{64}	—	February 29, 2000	Socorro	LINEAR	NYS ·	2.3 km	MPC · JPL
146029	2000 DK_{65}	—	February 29, 2000	Socorro	LINEAR	·	2.1 km	MPC · JPL
146030	2000 DM_{66}	—	February 29, 2000	Socorro	LINEAR	·	1.4 km	MPC · JPL
146031	2000 DL_{70}	—	February 29, 2000	Socorro	LINEAR	NYS	1.9 km	MPC · JPL
146032	2000 DV_{71}	—	February 29, 2000	Socorro	LINEAR	·	1.2 km	MPC · JPL
146033	2000 DS_{83}	—	February 28, 2000	Socorro	LINEAR	·	2.1 km	MPC · JPL
146034	2000 DT_{87}	—	February 29, 2000	Socorro	LINEAR	·	2.1 km	MPC · JPL
146035	2000 DG_{88}	—	February 29, 2000	Socorro	LINEAR	HIL · 3:2 · (6124)	10 km	MPC · JPL
146036	2000 DF_{89}	—	February 26, 2000	Kitt Peak	Spacewatch	·	2.0 km	MPC · JPL
146037	2000 DF_{93}	—	February 28, 2000	Socorro	LINEAR	·	2.0 km	MPC · JPL
146038	2000 DY_{104}	—	February 29, 2000	Socorro	LINEAR	·	1.9 km	MPC · JPL
146039	2000 DA_{108}	—	February 28, 2000	Socorro	LINEAR	NYS	2.4 km	MPC · JPL
146040 Alicebowman	2000 DV_{114}	Alicebowman	February 27, 2000	Kitt Peak	M. W. Buie	·	1.5 km	MPC · JPL
146041	2000 EN_{2}	—	March 3, 2000	Socorro	LINEAR	NYS	1.5 km	MPC · JPL
146042	2000 ET_{4}	—	March 2, 2000	Kitt Peak	Spacewatch	MAS	1.5 km	MPC · JPL
146043	2000 ET_{7}	—	March 2, 2000	Višnjan Observatory	K. Korlević	·	2.0 km	MPC · JPL
146044	2000 EB_{10}	—	March 3, 2000	Socorro	LINEAR	NYS	1.9 km	MPC · JPL
146045	2000 ET_{11}	—	March 4, 2000	Socorro	LINEAR	·	3.0 km	MPC · JPL
146046	2000 ES_{13}	—	March 5, 2000	Socorro	LINEAR	NYS	2.1 km	MPC · JPL
146047	2000 EC_{17}	—	March 3, 2000	Socorro	LINEAR	NYS	1.7 km	MPC · JPL
146048	2000 EX_{17}	—	March 4, 2000	Socorro	LINEAR	·	2.8 km	MPC · JPL
146049	2000 EK_{30}	—	March 5, 2000	Socorro	LINEAR	EUN	3.6 km	MPC · JPL
146050	2000 ED_{44}	—	March 9, 2000	Socorro	LINEAR	V	1.2 km	MPC · JPL
146051	2000 EU_{82}	—	March 5, 2000	Socorro	LINEAR	·	2.7 km	MPC · JPL
146052	2000 ES_{86}	—	March 8, 2000	Socorro	LINEAR	·	3.4 km	MPC · JPL
146053	2000 EO_{96}	—	March 12, 2000	Socorro	LINEAR	·	2.6 km	MPC · JPL
146054	2000 EB_{101}	—	March 12, 2000	Kitt Peak	Spacewatch	·	1.9 km	MPC · JPL
146055	2000 EO_{114}	—	March 9, 2000	Kvistaberg	Uppsala-DLR Asteroid Survey	NYS	1.7 km	MPC · JPL
146056	2000 EP_{123}	—	March 11, 2000	Anderson Mesa	LONEOS	NYS	2.0 km	MPC · JPL
146057	2000 EM_{137}	—	March 7, 2000	Socorro	LINEAR	·	2.5 km	MPC · JPL
146058	2000 EA_{171}	—	March 5, 2000	Socorro	LINEAR	·	4.2 km	MPC · JPL
146059	2000 ER_{181}	—	March 4, 2000	Socorro	LINEAR	KON	4.4 km	MPC · JPL
146060	2000 EH_{196}	—	March 3, 2000	Socorro	LINEAR	·	1.8 km	MPC · JPL
146061	2000 FG_{7}	—	March 29, 2000	Kitt Peak	Spacewatch	·	1.7 km	MPC · JPL
146062	2000 FU_{22}	—	March 29, 2000	Socorro	LINEAR	·	2.1 km	MPC · JPL
146063	2000 FU_{50}	—	March 29, 2000	Kitt Peak	Spacewatch	·	2.4 km	MPC · JPL
146064	2000 FC_{58}	—	March 26, 2000	Anderson Mesa	LONEOS	·	2.2 km	MPC · JPL
146065	2000 FW_{60}	—	March 29, 2000	Socorro	LINEAR	·	2.3 km	MPC · JPL
146066	2000 FO_{63}	—	March 29, 2000	Socorro	LINEAR	·	3.2 km	MPC · JPL
146067	2000 GQ_{35}	—	April 5, 2000	Socorro	LINEAR	·	2.0 km	MPC · JPL
146068	2000 GE_{64}	—	April 5, 2000	Socorro	LINEAR	·	1.7 km	MPC · JPL
146069	2000 GL_{85}	—	April 3, 2000	Socorro	LINEAR	·	2.3 km	MPC · JPL
146070	2000 GA_{87}	—	April 4, 2000	Socorro	LINEAR	·	2.5 km	MPC · JPL
146071	2000 GQ_{90}	—	April 4, 2000	Socorro	LINEAR	·	3.3 km	MPC · JPL
146072	2000 GR_{90}	—	April 4, 2000	Socorro	LINEAR	·	2.2 km	MPC · JPL
146073	2000 GT_{94}	—	April 5, 2000	Socorro	LINEAR	(194)	2.8 km	MPC · JPL
146074	2000 GV_{111}	—	April 3, 2000	Anderson Mesa	LONEOS	·	1.8 km	MPC · JPL
146075	2000 GC_{116}	—	April 8, 2000	Socorro	LINEAR	·	3.5 km	MPC · JPL
146076	2000 GR_{158}	—	April 7, 2000	Anderson Mesa	LONEOS	·	2.9 km	MPC · JPL
146077	2000 GZ_{158}	—	April 7, 2000	Socorro	LINEAR	·	1.6 km	MPC · JPL
146078	2000 GT_{169}	—	April 3, 2000	Anderson Mesa	LONEOS	NYS	2.1 km	MPC · JPL
146079	2000 GW_{176}	—	April 3, 2000	Kitt Peak	Spacewatch	·	1.9 km	MPC · JPL
146080	2000 HV_{3}	—	April 26, 2000	Kitt Peak	Spacewatch	·	2.0 km	MPC · JPL
146081	2000 HU_{14}	—	April 27, 2000	Socorro	LINEAR	·	2.4 km	MPC · JPL
146082	2000 HX_{29}	—	April 28, 2000	Socorro	LINEAR	·	2.2 km	MPC · JPL
146083	2000 HH_{43}	—	April 29, 2000	Socorro	LINEAR	NYS	2.0 km	MPC · JPL
146084	2000 HG_{62}	—	April 25, 2000	Kitt Peak	Spacewatch	NYS ·	2.5 km	MPC · JPL
146085	2000 HE_{73}	—	April 27, 2000	Anderson Mesa	LONEOS	·	1.4 km	MPC · JPL
146086	2000 JH_{4}	—	May 1, 2000	Kitt Peak	Spacewatch	·	2.2 km	MPC · JPL
146087	2000 JS_{13}	—	May 6, 2000	Socorro	LINEAR	NYS	2.0 km	MPC · JPL
146088	2000 JO_{33}	—	May 7, 2000	Socorro	LINEAR	·	2.6 km	MPC · JPL
146089	2000 KY_{5}	—	May 27, 2000	Socorro	LINEAR	·	3.0 km	MPC · JPL
146090	2000 KS_{19}	—	May 28, 2000	Socorro	LINEAR	·	1.6 km	MPC · JPL
146091	2000 KN_{35}	—	May 27, 2000	Socorro	LINEAR	·	2.7 km	MPC · JPL
146092	2000 KY_{39}	—	May 25, 2000	Kitt Peak	Spacewatch	·	1.7 km	MPC · JPL
146093	2000 KA_{43}	—	May 25, 2000	Kitt Peak	Spacewatch	(5)	2.3 km	MPC · JPL
146094	2000 KD_{83}	—	May 24, 2000	Anderson Mesa	LONEOS	·	2.2 km	MPC · JPL
146095	2000 OR_{12}	—	July 23, 2000	Socorro	LINEAR	EUN	2.3 km	MPC · JPL
146096	2000 OY_{15}	—	July 23, 2000	Socorro	LINEAR	·	3.4 km	MPC · JPL
146097	2000 PK_{7}	—	August 2, 2000	Socorro	LINEAR	·	7.0 km	MPC · JPL
146098	2000 PX_{7}	—	August 3, 2000	Socorro	LINEAR	·	4.8 km	MPC · JPL
146099	2000 PX_{25}	—	August 4, 2000	Haleakala	NEAT	·	8.5 km	MPC · JPL
146100	2000 PM_{26}	—	August 5, 2000	Haleakala	NEAT	·	6.3 km	MPC · JPL

== 146101–146200 ==
back to top

Designation			Discovery			Properties		Ref
Permanent	Provisional	Named after	Date	Site	Discoverer(s)	Category	Diam.	Ref
146101	2000 QR_{5}	—	August 24, 2000	Socorro	LINEAR	EUP	10 km	MPC · JPL
146102	2000 QB_{9}	—	August 25, 2000	Črni Vrh	Mikuž, H.	DOR	5.6 km	MPC · JPL
146103	2000 QK_{28}	—	August 24, 2000	Socorro	LINEAR	·	2.9 km	MPC · JPL
146104	2000 QP_{44}	—	August 24, 2000	Socorro	LINEAR	EOS	3.4 km	MPC · JPL
146105	2000 QW_{72}	—	August 24, 2000	Socorro	LINEAR	·	4.1 km	MPC · JPL
146106	2000 QP_{81}	—	August 24, 2000	Socorro	LINEAR	·	4.0 km	MPC · JPL
146107	2000 QL_{88}	—	August 25, 2000	Socorro	LINEAR	·	3.9 km	MPC · JPL
146108	2000 QK_{105}	—	August 28, 2000	Socorro	LINEAR	H	1.4 km	MPC · JPL
146109	2000 QH_{108}	—	August 29, 2000	Socorro	LINEAR	·	3.6 km	MPC · JPL
146110	2000 QH_{152}	—	August 28, 2000	Socorro	LINEAR	EUP	11 km	MPC · JPL
146111	2000 QV_{160}	—	August 31, 2000	Socorro	LINEAR	·	2.6 km	MPC · JPL
146112	2000 QW_{176}	—	August 31, 2000	Socorro	LINEAR	EUN	2.9 km	MPC · JPL
146113	2000 QQ_{179}	—	August 31, 2000	Socorro	LINEAR	THM	6.2 km	MPC · JPL
146114	2000 QU_{208}	—	August 31, 2000	Socorro	LINEAR	·	6.0 km	MPC · JPL
146115	2000 QC_{215}	—	August 31, 2000	Socorro	LINEAR	·	4.6 km	MPC · JPL
146116	2000 QY_{228}	—	August 31, 2000	Socorro	LINEAR	·	3.0 km	MPC · JPL
146117	2000 QB_{251}	—	August 21, 2000	Anderson Mesa	LONEOS	·	3.5 km	MPC · JPL
146118	2000 RZ_{2}	—	September 1, 2000	Socorro	LINEAR	·	4.4 km	MPC · JPL
146119	2000 RC_{15}	—	September 1, 2000	Socorro	LINEAR	·	4.2 km	MPC · JPL
146120	2000 RM_{18}	—	September 1, 2000	Socorro	LINEAR	·	3.9 km	MPC · JPL
146121	2000 RR_{18}	—	September 1, 2000	Socorro	LINEAR	EMA	7.5 km	MPC · JPL
146122	2000 RA_{23}	—	September 1, 2000	Socorro	LINEAR	·	3.9 km	MPC · JPL
146123	2000 RZ_{28}	—	September 1, 2000	Socorro	LINEAR	LIX	6.3 km	MPC · JPL
146124	2000 RN_{29}	—	September 1, 2000	Socorro	LINEAR	·	9.4 km	MPC · JPL
146125	2000 RM_{39}	—	September 1, 2000	Socorro	LINEAR	EOS	3.6 km	MPC · JPL
146126	2000 RL_{80}	—	September 1, 2000	Socorro	LINEAR	·	5.5 km	MPC · JPL
146127	2000 RD_{82}	—	September 1, 2000	Socorro	LINEAR	·	5.6 km	MPC · JPL
146128	2000 RQ_{82}	—	September 1, 2000	Socorro	LINEAR	·	3.9 km	MPC · JPL
146129	2000 RO_{92}	—	September 3, 2000	Socorro	LINEAR	·	4.8 km	MPC · JPL
146130	2000 RG_{93}	—	September 4, 2000	Socorro	LINEAR	·	2.5 km	MPC · JPL
146131	2000 RK_{97}	—	September 5, 2000	Anderson Mesa	LONEOS	·	3.6 km	MPC · JPL
146132	2000 RP_{101}	—	September 5, 2000	Anderson Mesa	LONEOS	EUP	8.5 km	MPC · JPL
146133	2000 RD_{105}	—	September 7, 2000	Socorro	LINEAR	·	4.3 km	MPC · JPL
146134	2000 SE_{1}	—	September 18, 2000	Socorro	LINEAR	·	1.3 km	MPC · JPL
146135	2000 SM_{1}	—	September 18, 2000	Socorro	LINEAR	H	1.5 km	MPC · JPL
146136	2000 SS_{27}	—	September 23, 2000	Socorro	LINEAR	EOS	2.8 km	MPC · JPL
146137	2000 SG_{28}	—	September 23, 2000	Socorro	LINEAR	EOS	3.8 km	MPC · JPL
146138	2000 SL_{30}	—	September 24, 2000	Socorro	LINEAR	EOS	3.2 km	MPC · JPL
146139	2000 SL_{33}	—	September 24, 2000	Socorro	LINEAR	·	2.9 km	MPC · JPL
146140	2000 SE_{48}	—	September 23, 2000	Socorro	LINEAR	·	3.9 km	MPC · JPL
146141	2000 SC_{52}	—	September 23, 2000	Socorro	LINEAR	·	2.8 km	MPC · JPL
146142	2000 SJ_{52}	—	September 23, 2000	Socorro	LINEAR	·	4.3 km	MPC · JPL
146143	2000 SF_{58}	—	September 24, 2000	Socorro	LINEAR	·	3.4 km	MPC · JPL
146144	2000 SY_{60}	—	September 24, 2000	Socorro	LINEAR	·	3.7 km	MPC · JPL
146145	2000 SQ_{63}	—	September 24, 2000	Socorro	LINEAR	EOS	3.4 km	MPC · JPL
146146	2000 SU_{91}	—	September 23, 2000	Socorro	LINEAR	·	4.4 km	MPC · JPL
146147	2000 SD_{93}	—	September 23, 2000	Socorro	LINEAR	EOS	3.3 km	MPC · JPL
146148	2000 SN_{132}	—	September 22, 2000	Socorro	LINEAR	·	9.9 km	MPC · JPL
146149	2000 SG_{134}	—	September 23, 2000	Socorro	LINEAR	EOS	3.8 km	MPC · JPL
146150	2000 SS_{138}	—	September 23, 2000	Socorro	LINEAR	EOS	3.0 km	MPC · JPL
146151	2000 SD_{142}	—	September 23, 2000	Socorro	LINEAR	EOS	3.3 km	MPC · JPL
146152	2000 SU_{147}	—	September 24, 2000	Socorro	LINEAR	·	6.1 km	MPC · JPL
146153	2000 SZ_{147}	—	September 24, 2000	Socorro	LINEAR	·	5.3 km	MPC · JPL
146154	2000 SQ_{150}	—	September 24, 2000	Socorro	LINEAR	EOS	3.8 km	MPC · JPL
146155	2000 SH_{151}	—	September 24, 2000	Socorro	LINEAR	TIR	4.4 km	MPC · JPL
146156	2000 SG_{158}	—	September 27, 2000	Socorro	LINEAR	·	7.5 km	MPC · JPL
146157	2000 SE_{168}	—	September 23, 2000	Socorro	LINEAR	·	3.7 km	MPC · JPL
146158	2000 SF_{169}	—	September 23, 2000	Socorro	LINEAR	·	6.7 km	MPC · JPL
146159	2000 SC_{177}	—	September 28, 2000	Socorro	LINEAR	·	6.9 km	MPC · JPL
146160	2000 SA_{183}	—	September 20, 2000	Kitt Peak	Spacewatch	·	5.0 km	MPC · JPL
146161	2000 SS_{186}	—	September 21, 2000	Haleakala	NEAT	·	5.4 km	MPC · JPL
146162	2000 SS_{188}	—	September 21, 2000	Haleakala	NEAT	·	7.3 km	MPC · JPL
146163	2000 ST_{204}	—	September 24, 2000	Socorro	LINEAR	·	5.7 km	MPC · JPL
146164	2000 SK_{224}	—	September 27, 2000	Socorro	LINEAR	·	3.3 km	MPC · JPL
146165	2000 SM_{227}	—	September 27, 2000	Socorro	LINEAR	·	5.0 km	MPC · JPL
146166	2000 SG_{266}	—	September 26, 2000	Socorro	LINEAR	·	5.6 km	MPC · JPL
146167	2000 SY_{266}	—	September 27, 2000	Socorro	LINEAR	·	8.2 km	MPC · JPL
146168	2000 SM_{267}	—	September 27, 2000	Socorro	LINEAR	·	4.9 km	MPC · JPL
146169	2000 SW_{274}	—	September 28, 2000	Socorro	LINEAR	·	7.2 km	MPC · JPL
146170	2000 SK_{275}	—	September 28, 2000	Socorro	LINEAR	·	5.9 km	MPC · JPL
146171	2000 SS_{282}	—	September 23, 2000	Socorro	LINEAR	·	3.1 km	MPC · JPL
146172	2000 SB_{283}	—	September 23, 2000	Socorro	LINEAR	·	4.0 km	MPC · JPL
146173	2000 SP_{284}	—	September 23, 2000	Socorro	LINEAR	·	4.7 km	MPC · JPL
146174	2000 SW_{295}	—	September 27, 2000	Socorro	LINEAR	·	4.3 km	MPC · JPL
146175	2000 SJ_{300}	—	September 28, 2000	Socorro	LINEAR	·	4.2 km	MPC · JPL
146176	2000 SM_{302}	—	September 28, 2000	Socorro	LINEAR	·	5.1 km	MPC · JPL
146177	2000 SN_{305}	—	September 30, 2000	Socorro	LINEAR	·	5.4 km	MPC · JPL
146178	2000 SZ_{305}	—	September 30, 2000	Socorro	LINEAR	·	4.7 km	MPC · JPL
146179	2000 SY_{309}	—	September 25, 2000	Socorro	LINEAR	·	7.5 km	MPC · JPL
146180	2000 SY_{312}	—	September 27, 2000	Socorro	LINEAR	·	7.0 km	MPC · JPL
146181	2000 SX_{316}	—	September 30, 2000	Socorro	LINEAR	·	6.8 km	MPC · JPL
146182	2000 SC_{325}	—	September 28, 2000	Kitt Peak	Spacewatch	KOR	2.3 km	MPC · JPL
146183	2000 SK_{327}	—	September 29, 2000	Haleakala	NEAT	THB	4.6 km	MPC · JPL
146184	2000 SX_{333}	—	September 26, 2000	Haleakala	NEAT	LIX	5.6 km	MPC · JPL
146185	2000 SD_{338}	—	September 25, 2000	Haleakala	NEAT	·	6.3 km	MPC · JPL
146186	2000 SC_{347}	—	September 25, 2000	Socorro	LINEAR	·	7.6 km	MPC · JPL
146187	2000 SE_{365}	—	September 21, 2000	Anderson Mesa	LONEOS	AGN	2.0 km	MPC · JPL
146188	2000 TD_{1}	—	October 1, 2000	Socorro	LINEAR	H	980 m	MPC · JPL
146189	2000 TN_{6}	—	October 1, 2000	Socorro	LINEAR	EOS	3.3 km	MPC · JPL
146190	2000 TC_{25}	—	October 2, 2000	Socorro	LINEAR	·	4.0 km	MPC · JPL
146191	2000 TE_{33}	—	October 4, 2000	Socorro	LINEAR	H	1.4 km	MPC · JPL
146192	2000 TK_{43}	—	October 1, 2000	Socorro	LINEAR	·	5.6 km	MPC · JPL
146193	2000 TO_{45}	—	October 1, 2000	Socorro	LINEAR	·	4.0 km	MPC · JPL
146194	2000 TO_{51}	—	October 1, 2000	Socorro	LINEAR	·	7.1 km	MPC · JPL
146195	2000 TY_{52}	—	October 1, 2000	Socorro	LINEAR	KOR	2.2 km	MPC · JPL
146196	2000 TJ_{55}	—	October 1, 2000	Socorro	LINEAR	·	3.3 km	MPC · JPL
146197	2000 TT_{61}	—	October 2, 2000	Anderson Mesa	LONEOS	·	5.0 km	MPC · JPL
146198	2000 TT_{68}	—	October 3, 2000	McGraw-Hill	Chaboyer, B.	·	3.4 km	MPC · JPL
146199	2000 UZ_{9}	—	October 24, 2000	Socorro	LINEAR	·	7.5 km	MPC · JPL
146200	2000 UY_{12}	—	October 25, 2000	Socorro	LINEAR	·	4.9 km	MPC · JPL

== 146201–146300 ==
back to top

Designation			Discovery			Properties		Ref
Permanent	Provisional	Named after	Date	Site	Discoverer(s)	Category	Diam.	Ref
146201	2000 UX_{18}	—	October 25, 2000	Socorro	LINEAR	·	6.9 km	MPC · JPL
146202	2000 UO_{34}	—	October 24, 2000	Socorro	LINEAR	HYG	5.3 km	MPC · JPL
146203	2000 UW_{56}	—	October 25, 2000	Socorro	LINEAR	·	4.3 km	MPC · JPL
146204	2000 UJ_{57}	—	October 25, 2000	Socorro	LINEAR	·	4.5 km	MPC · JPL
146205	2000 UW_{62}	—	October 25, 2000	Socorro	LINEAR	·	4.5 km	MPC · JPL
146206	2000 UT_{65}	—	October 25, 2000	Socorro	LINEAR	·	4.2 km	MPC · JPL
146207	2000 UH_{71}	—	October 25, 2000	Socorro	LINEAR	·	5.1 km	MPC · JPL
146208	2000 UW_{72}	—	October 25, 2000	Socorro	LINEAR	·	5.2 km	MPC · JPL
146209	2000 US_{82}	—	October 30, 2000	Socorro	LINEAR	·	4.9 km	MPC · JPL
146210	2000 UV_{94}	—	October 25, 2000	Socorro	LINEAR	EOS	3.0 km	MPC · JPL
146211	2000 UV_{97}	—	October 25, 2000	Socorro	LINEAR	·	5.9 km	MPC · JPL
146212	2000 UB_{105}	—	October 29, 2000	Socorro	LINEAR	·	4.9 km	MPC · JPL
146213	2000 UD_{107}	—	October 30, 2000	Socorro	LINEAR	·	4.8 km	MPC · JPL
146214	2000 VQ_{34}	—	November 1, 2000	Socorro	LINEAR	·	4.3 km	MPC · JPL
146215	2000 VV_{36}	—	November 1, 2000	Socorro	LINEAR	·	7.3 km	MPC · JPL
146216	2000 VS_{49}	—	November 2, 2000	Socorro	LINEAR	HYG	6.1 km	MPC · JPL
146217	2000 VX_{50}	—	November 3, 2000	Socorro	LINEAR	·	3.6 km	MPC · JPL
146218	2000 VN_{52}	—	November 3, 2000	Socorro	LINEAR	slow	7.7 km	MPC · JPL
146219	2000 VU_{52}	—	November 3, 2000	Socorro	LINEAR	HYG	3.8 km	MPC · JPL
146220	2000 VB_{58}	—	November 3, 2000	Socorro	LINEAR	·	4.2 km	MPC · JPL
146221	2000 VH_{58}	—	November 3, 2000	Socorro	LINEAR	·	4.2 km	MPC · JPL
146222	2000 WX_{3}	—	November 19, 2000	Socorro	LINEAR	·	6.7 km	MPC · JPL
146223	2000 WL_{4}	—	November 19, 2000	Socorro	LINEAR	EOS	3.1 km	MPC · JPL
146224	2000 WD_{38}	—	November 20, 2000	Socorro	LINEAR	EOS	3.2 km	MPC · JPL
146225	2000 WG_{47}	—	November 21, 2000	Socorro	LINEAR	·	7.8 km	MPC · JPL
146226	2000 WZ_{70}	—	November 19, 2000	Socorro	LINEAR	·	6.9 km	MPC · JPL
146227	2000 WA_{71}	—	November 19, 2000	Socorro	LINEAR	·	5.9 km	MPC · JPL
146228	2000 WL_{76}	—	November 20, 2000	Socorro	LINEAR	·	6.7 km	MPC · JPL
146229	2000 WM_{84}	—	November 20, 2000	Socorro	LINEAR	HYG	4.8 km	MPC · JPL
146230	2000 WN_{95}	—	November 21, 2000	Socorro	LINEAR	·	6.1 km	MPC · JPL
146231	2000 WX_{101}	—	November 26, 2000	Socorro	LINEAR	·	6.7 km	MPC · JPL
146232	2000 WJ_{125}	—	November 29, 2000	Socorro	LINEAR	·	5.2 km	MPC · JPL
146233	2000 WG_{137}	—	November 20, 2000	Socorro	LINEAR	(31811)	6.3 km	MPC · JPL
146234	2000 WF_{143}	—	November 20, 2000	Anderson Mesa	LONEOS	·	5.2 km	MPC · JPL
146235	2000 WA_{145}	—	November 21, 2000	Haleakala	NEAT	·	4.5 km	MPC · JPL
146236	2000 WV_{148}	—	November 28, 2000	Haleakala	NEAT	TIR	4.6 km	MPC · JPL
146237	2000 WP_{154}	—	November 30, 2000	Socorro	LINEAR	·	7.0 km	MPC · JPL
146238	2000 WZ_{154}	—	November 30, 2000	Socorro	LINEAR	·	3.8 km	MPC · JPL
146239	2000 WN_{171}	—	November 25, 2000	Socorro	LINEAR	·	5.3 km	MPC · JPL
146240	2000 WS_{180}	—	November 29, 2000	Anderson Mesa	LONEOS	·	5.5 km	MPC · JPL
146241	2000 WV_{191}	—	November 19, 2000	Anderson Mesa	LONEOS	EMA	6.7 km	MPC · JPL
146242	2000 XQ_{2}	—	December 1, 2000	Socorro	LINEAR	·	9.6 km	MPC · JPL
146243	2000 XA_{3}	—	December 1, 2000	Socorro	LINEAR	LIX	7.0 km	MPC · JPL
146244	2000 XO_{3}	—	December 1, 2000	Socorro	LINEAR	·	6.7 km	MPC · JPL
146245	2000 XV_{18}	—	December 4, 2000	Socorro	LINEAR	·	8.3 km	MPC · JPL
146246	2000 XX_{19}	—	December 4, 2000	Socorro	LINEAR	LIX	6.8 km	MPC · JPL
146247	2000 XU_{23}	—	December 4, 2000	Socorro	LINEAR	·	6.4 km	MPC · JPL
146248	2000 XW_{35}	—	December 5, 2000	Socorro	LINEAR	·	8.7 km	MPC · JPL
146249	2000 YN_{6}	—	December 20, 2000	Socorro	LINEAR	·	6.0 km	MPC · JPL
146250	2000 YZ_{11}	—	December 23, 2000	Haleakala	NEAT	T_{j} (2.99) · EUP	9.2 km	MPC · JPL
146251	2000 YO_{42}	—	December 30, 2000	Socorro	LINEAR	·	5.8 km	MPC · JPL
146252	2000 YS_{48}	—	December 30, 2000	Socorro	LINEAR	·	4.8 km	MPC · JPL
146253	2000 YB_{50}	—	December 30, 2000	Socorro	LINEAR	·	8.1 km	MPC · JPL
146254	2000 YT_{50}	—	December 30, 2000	Socorro	LINEAR	·	1.1 km	MPC · JPL
146255	2000 YA_{63}	—	December 30, 2000	Socorro	LINEAR	·	7.0 km	MPC · JPL
146256	2000 YE_{81}	—	December 30, 2000	Socorro	LINEAR	THM	4.0 km	MPC · JPL
146257	2000 YM_{135}	—	December 17, 2000	Socorro	LINEAR	THB	6.6 km	MPC · JPL
146258	2001 AO_{22}	—	January 3, 2001	Socorro	LINEAR	CYB · 2:1J	4.5 km	MPC · JPL
146259	2001 BL_{7}	—	January 19, 2001	Socorro	LINEAR	·	1.6 km	MPC · JPL
146260	2001 BX_{8}	—	January 19, 2001	Socorro	LINEAR	·	5.4 km	MPC · JPL
146261	2001 BA_{10}	—	January 19, 2001	Kitt Peak	Spacewatch	EUP	8.0 km	MPC · JPL
146262	2001 BU_{39}	—	January 23, 2001	Kitt Peak	Spacewatch	·	1.5 km	MPC · JPL
146263	2001 BG_{62}	—	January 26, 2001	Socorro	LINEAR	URS	7.2 km	MPC · JPL
146264	2001 BM_{74}	—	January 31, 2001	Socorro	LINEAR	HYG	5.6 km	MPC · JPL
146265	2001 BC_{78}	—	January 24, 2001	Socorro	LINEAR	·	6.9 km	MPC · JPL
146266	2001 CY	—	February 1, 2001	Socorro	LINEAR	·	7.5 km	MPC · JPL
146267	2001 CO_{26}	—	February 1, 2001	Socorro	LINEAR	·	2.3 km	MPC · JPL
146268 Jennipolakis	2001 DQ	Jennipolakis	February 16, 2001	Junk Bond	D. Healy	·	1.0 km	MPC · JPL
146269	2001 DY_{36}	—	February 19, 2001	Socorro	LINEAR	·	7.4 km	MPC · JPL
146270	2001 DT_{50}	—	February 16, 2001	Socorro	LINEAR	V	1.2 km	MPC · JPL
146271	2001 DQ_{75}	—	February 20, 2001	Socorro	LINEAR	HYG	5.8 km	MPC · JPL
146272	2001 EY_{5}	—	March 2, 2001	Anderson Mesa	LONEOS	·	2.1 km	MPC · JPL
146273	2001 ES_{22}	—	March 15, 2001	Kitt Peak	Spacewatch	·	1.6 km	MPC · JPL
146274	2001 FF_{6}	—	March 19, 2001	Socorro	LINEAR	·	1.2 km	MPC · JPL
146275	2001 FK_{12}	—	March 19, 2001	Anderson Mesa	LONEOS	·	2.7 km	MPC · JPL
146276	2001 FG_{40}	—	March 18, 2001	Socorro	LINEAR	MAS	1.4 km	MPC · JPL
146277	2001 FJ_{49}	—	March 18, 2001	Socorro	LINEAR	·	2.5 km	MPC · JPL
146278	2001 FG_{63}	—	March 19, 2001	Socorro	LINEAR	·	1.5 km	MPC · JPL
146279	2001 FT_{68}	—	March 19, 2001	Socorro	LINEAR	NYS	2.1 km	MPC · JPL
146280	2001 FW_{69}	—	March 19, 2001	Socorro	LINEAR	·	1.1 km	MPC · JPL
146281	2001 FO_{75}	—	March 19, 2001	Socorro	LINEAR	·	1.5 km	MPC · JPL
146282	2001 FV_{99}	—	March 16, 2001	Socorro	LINEAR	·	1.7 km	MPC · JPL
146283	2001 FQ_{110}	—	March 18, 2001	Socorro	LINEAR	·	2.3 km	MPC · JPL
146284	2001 FC_{126}	—	March 29, 2001	Kitt Peak	Spacewatch	·	1.6 km	MPC · JPL
146285	2001 FZ_{145}	—	March 24, 2001	Anderson Mesa	LONEOS	PHO	1.8 km	MPC · JPL
146286	2001 FR_{155}	—	March 26, 2001	Haleakala	NEAT	NYS	2.1 km	MPC · JPL
146287	2001 FS_{180}	—	March 20, 2001	Anderson Mesa	LONEOS	·	1.8 km	MPC · JPL
146288	2001 GC	—	April 1, 2001	Kanab	Sheridan, E. E.	·	2.7 km	MPC · JPL
146289	2001 GH_{1}	—	April 13, 2001	Socorro	LINEAR	PHO	2.6 km	MPC · JPL
146290	2001 HE_{9}	—	April 16, 2001	Socorro	LINEAR	·	1.4 km	MPC · JPL
146291	2001 HT_{12}	—	April 18, 2001	Socorro	LINEAR	·	1.5 km	MPC · JPL
146292	2001 HZ_{13}	—	April 21, 2001	Bergisch Gladbach	W. Bickel	·	1.9 km	MPC · JPL
146293	2001 HC_{22}	—	April 23, 2001	Socorro	LINEAR	V	1.2 km	MPC · JPL
146294	2001 HP_{30}	—	April 26, 2001	Kitt Peak	Spacewatch	V	940 m	MPC · JPL
146295	2001 HA_{43}	—	April 16, 2001	Anderson Mesa	LONEOS	·	1.3 km	MPC · JPL
146296	2001 HW_{52}	—	April 23, 2001	Socorro	LINEAR	NYS	1.9 km	MPC · JPL
146297	2001 HY_{52}	—	April 23, 2001	Socorro	LINEAR	·	2.1 km	MPC · JPL
146298	2001 HR_{65}	—	April 30, 2001	Socorro	LINEAR	·	1.7 km	MPC · JPL
146299	2001 JR	—	May 4, 2001	Haleakala	NEAT	·	2.7 km	MPC · JPL
146300	2001 JM_{5}	—	May 14, 2001	Haleakala	NEAT	·	2.4 km	MPC · JPL

== 146301–146400 ==
back to top

Designation			Discovery			Properties		Ref
Permanent	Provisional	Named after	Date	Site	Discoverer(s)	Category	Diam.	Ref
146301	2001 KN	—	May 17, 2001	Socorro	LINEAR	·	2.0 km	MPC · JPL
146302	2001 KK_{3}	—	May 17, 2001	Socorro	LINEAR	MAS	1.4 km	MPC · JPL
146303	2001 KY_{5}	—	May 17, 2001	Socorro	LINEAR	·	1.2 km	MPC · JPL
146304	2001 KT_{15}	—	May 18, 2001	Socorro	LINEAR	·	1.2 km	MPC · JPL
146305	2001 KC_{19}	—	May 18, 2001	Socorro	LINEAR	V	1.4 km	MPC · JPL
146306	2001 KM_{19}	—	May 21, 2001	Socorro	LINEAR	·	2.0 km	MPC · JPL
146307	2001 KK_{21}	—	May 23, 2001	Socorro	LINEAR	PHO	1.5 km	MPC · JPL
146308	2001 KJ_{28}	—	May 18, 2001	Socorro	LINEAR	·	2.4 km	MPC · JPL
146309	2001 KD_{30}	—	May 21, 2001	Socorro	LINEAR	·	2.6 km	MPC · JPL
146310	2001 KC_{37}	—	May 21, 2001	Socorro	LINEAR	·	3.0 km	MPC · JPL
146311	2001 KS_{37}	—	May 22, 2001	Socorro	LINEAR	·	1.6 km	MPC · JPL
146312	2001 KU_{51}	—	May 16, 2001	Kitt Peak	Spacewatch	·	2.6 km	MPC · JPL
146313	2001 KM_{52}	—	May 18, 2001	Anderson Mesa	LONEOS	·	1.2 km	MPC · JPL
146314	2001 KO_{54}	—	May 17, 2001	Haleakala	NEAT	·	1.7 km	MPC · JPL
146315	2001 KG_{57}	—	May 23, 2001	Socorro	LINEAR	·	3.7 km	MPC · JPL
146316	2001 KK_{60}	—	May 16, 2001	Haleakala	NEAT	·	1.4 km	MPC · JPL
146317	2001 KT_{61}	—	May 18, 2001	Socorro	LINEAR	NYS	2.0 km	MPC · JPL
146318	2001 LE_{1}	—	June 13, 2001	Socorro	LINEAR	PHO	1.9 km	MPC · JPL
146319	2001 LN_{3}	—	June 13, 2001	Socorro	LINEAR	NYS	2.4 km	MPC · JPL
146320	2001 LZ_{5}	—	June 15, 2001	Socorro	LINEAR	·	1.4 km	MPC · JPL
146321	2001 LA_{6}	—	June 11, 2001	Kitt Peak	Spacewatch	PHO	2.3 km	MPC · JPL
146322	2001 LM_{17}	—	June 15, 2001	Socorro	LINEAR	·	3.2 km	MPC · JPL
146323	2001 LX_{18}	—	June 15, 2001	Socorro	LINEAR	EUN	3.4 km	MPC · JPL
146324	2001 LY_{18}	—	June 15, 2001	Socorro	LINEAR	·	6.5 km	MPC · JPL
146325	2001 MB_{28}	—	June 23, 2001	Palomar	NEAT	·	2.1 km	MPC · JPL
146326	2001 NL_{3}	—	July 13, 2001	Palomar	NEAT	·	3.9 km	MPC · JPL
146327	2001 NM_{4}	—	July 13, 2001	Palomar	NEAT	·	2.0 km	MPC · JPL
146328	2001 NV_{6}	—	July 14, 2001	Palomar	NEAT	·	2.0 km	MPC · JPL
146329	2001 NJ_{8}	—	July 14, 2001	Palomar	NEAT	·	2.2 km	MPC · JPL
146330	2001 NK_{17}	—	July 14, 2001	Palomar	NEAT	·	2.1 km	MPC · JPL
146331	2001 NO_{20}	—	July 13, 2001	Palomar	NEAT	·	2.4 km	MPC · JPL
146332	2001 OL	—	July 17, 2001	Palomar	NEAT	·	2.7 km	MPC · JPL
146333	2001 OE_{1}	—	July 17, 2001	Haleakala	NEAT	·	2.4 km	MPC · JPL
146334	2001 OL_{10}	—	July 19, 2001	Palomar	NEAT	V	1.1 km	MPC · JPL
146335	2001 OK_{11}	—	July 17, 2001	Palomar	NEAT	MRX	1.7 km	MPC · JPL
146336	2001 OK_{13}	—	July 20, 2001	Socorro	LINEAR	·	1.9 km	MPC · JPL
146337	2001 OW_{14}	—	July 20, 2001	Socorro	LINEAR	JUN	2.7 km	MPC · JPL
146338	2001 OH_{37}	—	July 20, 2001	Palomar	NEAT	·	2.7 km	MPC · JPL
146339	2001 OY_{46}	—	July 16, 2001	Anderson Mesa	LONEOS	·	1.7 km	MPC · JPL
146340	2001 OF_{51}	—	July 21, 2001	Palomar	NEAT	·	6.4 km	MPC · JPL
146341	2001 OS_{53}	—	July 21, 2001	Palomar	NEAT	·	3.0 km	MPC · JPL
146342	2001 OZ_{59}	—	July 21, 2001	Haleakala	NEAT	·	1.9 km	MPC · JPL
146343	2001 OD_{62}	—	July 21, 2001	Haleakala	NEAT	PHO	1.9 km	MPC · JPL
146344	2001 OF_{68}	—	July 16, 2001	Anderson Mesa	LONEOS	ADE	5.1 km	MPC · JPL
146345	2001 OJ_{73}	—	July 21, 2001	Anderson Mesa	LONEOS	·	2.4 km	MPC · JPL
146346	2001 OS_{85}	—	July 20, 2001	Socorro	LINEAR	ADE ·	3.6 km	MPC · JPL
146347	2001 OH_{87}	—	July 29, 2001	Palomar	NEAT	·	2.1 km	MPC · JPL
146348	2001 OF_{93}	—	July 25, 2001	Palomar	NEAT	·	2.6 km	MPC · JPL
146349	2001 OX_{96}	—	July 25, 2001	Haleakala	NEAT	·	2.9 km	MPC · JPL
146350	2001 OC_{97}	—	July 25, 2001	Haleakala	NEAT	·	2.2 km	MPC · JPL
146351	2001 OH_{97}	—	July 25, 2001	Haleakala	NEAT	·	2.0 km	MPC · JPL
146352	2001 OG_{103}	—	July 29, 2001	Socorro	LINEAR	·	2.1 km	MPC · JPL
146353	2001 OK_{103}	—	July 29, 2001	Socorro	LINEAR	ADE	3.9 km	MPC · JPL
146354	2001 OK_{106}	—	July 29, 2001	Socorro	LINEAR	·	2.7 km	MPC · JPL
146355	2001 OL_{106}	—	July 29, 2001	Socorro	LINEAR	EUN	2.7 km	MPC · JPL
146356	2001 OB_{107}	—	July 29, 2001	Socorro	LINEAR	·	4.9 km	MPC · JPL
146357	2001 OH_{107}	—	July 29, 2001	Socorro	LINEAR	·	4.1 km	MPC · JPL
146358	2001 OD_{113}	—	July 30, 2001	Palomar	NEAT	·	3.8 km	MPC · JPL
146359	2001 PG_{4}	—	August 6, 2001	Palomar	NEAT	·	3.9 km	MPC · JPL
146360	2001 PM_{4}	—	August 10, 2001	Palomar	NEAT	·	2.5 km	MPC · JPL
146361	2001 PL_{5}	—	August 10, 2001	Palomar	NEAT	·	3.2 km	MPC · JPL
146362	2001 PR_{13}	—	August 13, 2001	Farra d'Isonzo	Farra d'Isonzo	·	2.3 km	MPC · JPL
146363	2001 PA_{26}	—	August 11, 2001	Haleakala	NEAT	·	1.6 km	MPC · JPL
146364	2001 PX_{26}	—	August 11, 2001	Haleakala	NEAT	·	1.9 km	MPC · JPL
146365	2001 PC_{32}	—	August 10, 2001	Palomar	NEAT	RAF · slow	1.7 km	MPC · JPL
146366	2001 PT_{40}	—	August 11, 2001	Palomar	NEAT	·	2.1 km	MPC · JPL
146367	2001 PO_{42}	—	August 12, 2001	Palomar	NEAT	·	3.0 km	MPC · JPL
146368	2001 PZ_{45}	—	August 12, 2001	Palomar	NEAT	·	2.7 km	MPC · JPL
146369	2001 PD_{50}	—	August 15, 2001	Haleakala	NEAT	·	2.3 km	MPC · JPL
146370	2001 PE_{58}	—	August 14, 2001	Haleakala	NEAT	·	2.3 km	MPC · JPL
146371	2001 PF_{62}	—	August 13, 2001	Haleakala	NEAT	·	1.6 km	MPC · JPL
146372	2001 QE_{2}	—	August 16, 2001	Ametlla de Mar	J. Nomen	RAF	1.8 km	MPC · JPL
146373	2001 QM_{3}	—	August 16, 2001	Socorro	LINEAR	·	2.7 km	MPC · JPL
146374	2001 QG_{4}	—	August 16, 2001	Socorro	LINEAR	MAS	1.2 km	MPC · JPL
146375	2001 QZ_{11}	—	August 16, 2001	Socorro	LINEAR	·	1.9 km	MPC · JPL
146376	2001 QJ_{12}	—	August 16, 2001	Socorro	LINEAR	·	5.2 km	MPC · JPL
146377	2001 QF_{16}	—	August 16, 2001	Socorro	LINEAR	(5)	2.4 km	MPC · JPL
146378	2001 QN_{32}	—	August 17, 2001	Palomar	NEAT	·	5.1 km	MPC · JPL
146379	2001 QS_{39}	—	August 16, 2001	Socorro	LINEAR	·	2.3 km	MPC · JPL
146380	2001 QV_{50}	—	August 16, 2001	Socorro	LINEAR	·	3.0 km	MPC · JPL
146381	2001 QC_{52}	—	August 16, 2001	Socorro	LINEAR	(5)	2.3 km	MPC · JPL
146382	2001 QS_{52}	—	August 16, 2001	Socorro	LINEAR	·	2.3 km	MPC · JPL
146383	2001 QD_{58}	—	August 16, 2001	Socorro	LINEAR	(5)	2.0 km	MPC · JPL
146384	2001 QF_{59}	—	August 17, 2001	Socorro	LINEAR	·	5.4 km	MPC · JPL
146385	2001 QY_{62}	—	August 16, 2001	Socorro	LINEAR	ADE	5.5 km	MPC · JPL
146386	2001 QO_{70}	—	August 17, 2001	Socorro	LINEAR	·	4.4 km	MPC · JPL
146387	2001 QX_{76}	—	August 16, 2001	Socorro	LINEAR	·	3.3 km	MPC · JPL
146388	2001 QG_{82}	—	August 17, 2001	Socorro	LINEAR	·	4.0 km	MPC · JPL
146389	2001 QM_{82}	—	August 17, 2001	Socorro	LINEAR	·	2.2 km	MPC · JPL
146390	2001 QJ_{87}	—	August 17, 2001	Palomar	NEAT	·	2.7 km	MPC · JPL
146391	2001 QB_{102}	—	August 18, 2001	Socorro	LINEAR	EUN	3.0 km	MPC · JPL
146392	2001 QJ_{114}	—	August 17, 2001	Socorro	LINEAR	·	2.8 km	MPC · JPL
146393	2001 QO_{119}	—	August 18, 2001	Socorro	LINEAR	·	4.7 km	MPC · JPL
146394	2001 QH_{133}	—	August 21, 2001	Socorro	LINEAR	·	2.5 km	MPC · JPL
146395	2001 QX_{143}	—	August 21, 2001	Kitt Peak	Spacewatch	·	1.8 km	MPC · JPL
146396	2001 QQ_{149}	—	August 22, 2001	Haleakala	NEAT	·	2.9 km	MPC · JPL
146397	2001 QW_{153}	—	August 27, 2001	Ondřejov	P. Kušnirák	·	2.5 km	MPC · JPL
146398	2001 QL_{156}	—	August 23, 2001	Anderson Mesa	LONEOS	·	2.6 km	MPC · JPL
146399	2001 QS_{162}	—	August 23, 2001	Anderson Mesa	LONEOS	·	2.0 km	MPC · JPL
146400	2001 QJ_{163}	—	August 23, 2001	Anderson Mesa	LONEOS	(5)	2.0 km	MPC · JPL

== 146401–146500 ==
back to top

Designation			Discovery			Properties		Ref
Permanent	Provisional	Named after	Date	Site	Discoverer(s)	Category	Diam.	Ref
146401	2001 QK_{164}	—	August 21, 2001	Palomar	NEAT	·	2.5 km	MPC · JPL
146402	2001 QV_{164}	—	August 22, 2001	Haleakala	NEAT	·	1.8 km	MPC · JPL
146403	2001 QA_{166}	—	August 24, 2001	Haleakala	NEAT	·	2.2 km	MPC · JPL
146404	2001 QZ_{180}	—	August 27, 2001	Goodricke-Pigott	R. A. Tucker	·	3.8 km	MPC · JPL
146405	2001 QJ_{185}	—	August 21, 2001	Socorro	LINEAR	·	2.5 km	MPC · JPL
146406	2001 QU_{189}	—	August 22, 2001	Socorro	LINEAR	·	2.2 km	MPC · JPL
146407	2001 QK_{190}	—	August 22, 2001	Socorro	LINEAR	·	2.3 km	MPC · JPL
146408	2001 QC_{192}	—	August 22, 2001	Socorro	LINEAR	MAR	1.8 km	MPC · JPL
146409	2001 QQ_{193}	—	August 22, 2001	Socorro	LINEAR	·	3.1 km	MPC · JPL
146410	2001 QU_{193}	—	August 22, 2001	Socorro	LINEAR	·	3.2 km	MPC · JPL
146411	2001 QF_{194}	—	August 22, 2001	Socorro	LINEAR	·	3.5 km	MPC · JPL
146412	2001 QU_{196}	—	August 22, 2001	Socorro	LINEAR	·	3.1 km	MPC · JPL
146413	2001 QM_{197}	—	August 22, 2001	Palomar	NEAT	BRA	3.2 km	MPC · JPL
146414	2001 QV_{197}	—	August 22, 2001	Socorro	LINEAR	·	2.5 km	MPC · JPL
146415	2001 QS_{199}	—	August 22, 2001	Socorro	LINEAR	·	5.5 km	MPC · JPL
146416	2001 QC_{215}	—	August 23, 2001	Anderson Mesa	LONEOS	·	1.8 km	MPC · JPL
146417	2001 QB_{217}	—	August 23, 2001	Anderson Mesa	LONEOS	·	2.0 km	MPC · JPL
146418	2001 QG_{219}	—	August 23, 2001	Kitt Peak	Spacewatch	·	1.9 km	MPC · JPL
146419	2001 QP_{219}	—	August 23, 2001	Socorro	LINEAR	·	3.3 km	MPC · JPL
146420	2001 QA_{220}	—	August 23, 2001	Socorro	LINEAR	MAR	2.3 km	MPC · JPL
146421	2001 QP_{220}	—	August 24, 2001	Anderson Mesa	LONEOS	·	2.7 km	MPC · JPL
146422	2001 QP_{224}	—	August 24, 2001	Socorro	LINEAR	·	1.9 km	MPC · JPL
146423	2001 QK_{228}	—	August 24, 2001	Anderson Mesa	LONEOS	·	2.7 km	MPC · JPL
146424	2001 QO_{231}	—	August 24, 2001	Anderson Mesa	LONEOS	EUN	2.2 km	MPC · JPL
146425	2001 QQ_{240}	—	August 24, 2001	Socorro	LINEAR	·	3.0 km	MPC · JPL
146426	2001 QF_{245}	—	August 24, 2001	Socorro	LINEAR	·	5.6 km	MPC · JPL
146427	2001 QG_{247}	—	August 24, 2001	Socorro	LINEAR	·	3.6 km	MPC · JPL
146428	2001 QC_{258}	—	August 25, 2001	Anderson Mesa	LONEOS	·	2.1 km	MPC · JPL
146429	2001 QQ_{258}	—	August 25, 2001	Socorro	LINEAR	·	3.1 km	MPC · JPL
146430	2001 QR_{259}	—	August 25, 2001	Socorro	LINEAR	·	2.1 km	MPC · JPL
146431	2001 QT_{267}	—	August 20, 2001	Socorro	LINEAR	·	2.5 km	MPC · JPL
146432	2001 QW_{269}	—	August 19, 2001	Socorro	LINEAR	·	2.4 km	MPC · JPL
146433	2001 QX_{274}	—	August 19, 2001	Socorro	LINEAR	·	3.5 km	MPC · JPL
146434	2001 QM_{275}	—	August 19, 2001	Anderson Mesa	LONEOS	·	2.6 km	MPC · JPL
146435	2001 QU_{278}	—	August 19, 2001	Socorro	LINEAR	·	5.0 km	MPC · JPL
146436	2001 QC_{280}	—	August 19, 2001	Socorro	LINEAR	(5)	1.9 km	MPC · JPL
146437	2001 QK_{282}	—	August 19, 2001	Socorro	LINEAR	·	3.5 km	MPC · JPL
146438	2001 QQ_{283}	—	August 18, 2001	Palomar	NEAT	EUN	2.4 km	MPC · JPL
146439	2001 QD_{284}	—	August 18, 2001	Palomar	NEAT	·	2.8 km	MPC · JPL
146440	2001 QH_{284}	—	August 18, 2001	Palomar	NEAT	·	2.3 km	MPC · JPL
146441	2001 QQ_{291}	—	August 16, 2001	Socorro	LINEAR	PHO	5.6 km	MPC · JPL
146442 Dwaynebrown	2001 QS_{320}	Dwaynebrown	August 20, 2001	Cerro Tololo	M. W. Buie	NYS	1.9 km	MPC · JPL
146443	2001 QQ_{333}	—	August 26, 2001	Anderson Mesa	LONEOS	·	2.4 km	MPC · JPL
146444	2001 RB	—	September 2, 2001	Eskridge	G. Hug	(1547)	3.6 km	MPC · JPL
146445	2001 RC_{1}	—	September 7, 2001	Socorro	LINEAR	·	2.0 km	MPC · JPL
146446	2001 RA_{3}	—	September 8, 2001	Anderson Mesa	LONEOS	·	2.5 km	MPC · JPL
146447	2001 RU_{8}	—	September 9, 2001	Socorro	LINEAR	ERI	3.3 km	MPC · JPL
146448	2001 RQ_{14}	—	September 10, 2001	Socorro	LINEAR	·	1.9 km	MPC · JPL
146449	2001 RC_{22}	—	September 7, 2001	Socorro	LINEAR	NYS	1.8 km	MPC · JPL
146450	2001 RE_{26}	—	September 7, 2001	Socorro	LINEAR	·	2.7 km	MPC · JPL
146451	2001 RP_{26}	—	September 7, 2001	Socorro	LINEAR	·	4.6 km	MPC · JPL
146452	2001 RQ_{27}	—	September 7, 2001	Socorro	LINEAR	·	3.2 km	MPC · JPL
146453	2001 RC_{28}	—	September 7, 2001	Socorro	LINEAR	(5)	2.4 km	MPC · JPL
146454	2001 RE_{29}	—	September 7, 2001	Socorro	LINEAR	(29841)	2.2 km	MPC · JPL
146455	2001 RD_{31}	—	September 7, 2001	Socorro	LINEAR	HNS	1.9 km	MPC · JPL
146456	2001 RP_{34}	—	September 8, 2001	Socorro	LINEAR	·	3.4 km	MPC · JPL
146457	2001 RH_{37}	—	September 8, 2001	Socorro	LINEAR	·	3.9 km	MPC · JPL
146458	2001 RH_{38}	—	September 8, 2001	Socorro	LINEAR	·	3.6 km	MPC · JPL
146459	2001 RJ_{39}	—	September 10, 2001	Socorro	LINEAR	·	2.1 km	MPC · JPL
146460	2001 RR_{51}	—	September 12, 2001	Socorro	LINEAR	·	3.1 km	MPC · JPL
146461	2001 RX_{56}	—	September 12, 2001	Socorro	LINEAR	·	2.1 km	MPC · JPL
146462	2001 RJ_{58}	—	September 12, 2001	Socorro	LINEAR	·	2.6 km	MPC · JPL
146463	2001 RM_{59}	—	September 12, 2001	Socorro	LINEAR	·	2.7 km	MPC · JPL
146464	2001 RC_{61}	—	September 12, 2001	Socorro	LINEAR	·	3.4 km	MPC · JPL
146465	2001 RJ_{61}	—	September 12, 2001	Socorro	LINEAR	·	4.3 km	MPC · JPL
146466	2001 RY_{62}	—	September 12, 2001	Socorro	LINEAR	·	4.7 km	MPC · JPL
146467	2001 RX_{63}	—	September 10, 2001	Socorro	LINEAR	·	4.5 km	MPC · JPL
146468	2001 RG_{65}	—	September 10, 2001	Socorro	LINEAR	GEF	1.9 km	MPC · JPL
146469	2001 RR_{75}	—	September 10, 2001	Socorro	LINEAR	·	4.2 km	MPC · JPL
146470	2001 RM_{78}	—	September 10, 2001	Socorro	LINEAR	·	2.5 km	MPC · JPL
146471	2001 RY_{78}	—	September 10, 2001	Socorro	LINEAR	·	4.3 km	MPC · JPL
146472	2001 RO_{79}	—	September 10, 2001	Socorro	LINEAR	·	4.8 km	MPC · JPL
146473	2001 RD_{81}	—	September 14, 2001	Palomar	NEAT	·	2.9 km	MPC · JPL
146474	2001 RC_{83}	—	September 11, 2001	Anderson Mesa	LONEOS	·	2.4 km	MPC · JPL
146475	2001 RS_{90}	—	September 11, 2001	Anderson Mesa	LONEOS	·	4.2 km	MPC · JPL
146476	2001 RK_{96}	—	September 12, 2001	Kitt Peak	Spacewatch	·	1.6 km	MPC · JPL
146477	2001 RG_{103}	—	September 12, 2001	Socorro	LINEAR	·	2.3 km	MPC · JPL
146478	2001 RJ_{107}	—	September 12, 2001	Socorro	LINEAR	·	1.8 km	MPC · JPL
146479	2001 RQ_{117}	—	September 12, 2001	Socorro	LINEAR	·	2.6 km	MPC · JPL
146480	2001 RB_{121}	—	September 12, 2001	Socorro	LINEAR	·	2.8 km	MPC · JPL
146481	2001 RC_{123}	—	September 12, 2001	Socorro	LINEAR	·	2.1 km	MPC · JPL
146482	2001 RR_{127}	—	September 12, 2001	Socorro	LINEAR	V	1.0 km	MPC · JPL
146483	2001 RF_{129}	—	September 12, 2001	Socorro	LINEAR	·	4.6 km	MPC · JPL
146484	2001 RX_{136}	—	September 12, 2001	Socorro	LINEAR	·	3.0 km	MPC · JPL
146485	2001 RJ_{144}	—	September 8, 2001	Socorro	LINEAR	·	2.2 km	MPC · JPL
146486	2001 RY_{150}	—	September 11, 2001	Anderson Mesa	LONEOS	(5)	2.8 km	MPC · JPL
146487	2001 RQ_{151}	—	September 11, 2001	Anderson Mesa	LONEOS	·	1.9 km	MPC · JPL
146488	2001 RP_{153}	—	September 13, 2001	Palomar	NEAT	·	2.1 km	MPC · JPL
146489	2001 SW_{2}	—	September 17, 2001	Desert Eagle	W. K. Y. Yeung	·	2.1 km	MPC · JPL
146490	2001 SB_{11}	—	September 16, 2001	Socorro	LINEAR	·	3.3 km	MPC · JPL
146491	2001 SG_{14}	—	September 16, 2001	Socorro	LINEAR	·	2.1 km	MPC · JPL
146492	2001 SB_{20}	—	September 16, 2001	Socorro	LINEAR	(5)	2.2 km	MPC · JPL
146493	2001 SF_{21}	—	September 16, 2001	Socorro	LINEAR	·	2.9 km	MPC · JPL
146494	2001 SO_{22}	—	September 16, 2001	Socorro	LINEAR	·	3.6 km	MPC · JPL
146495	2001 SD_{25}	—	September 16, 2001	Socorro	LINEAR	(17392)	2.2 km	MPC · JPL
146496	2001 SL_{27}	—	September 16, 2001	Socorro	LINEAR	·	2.1 km	MPC · JPL
146497	2001 SM_{28}	—	September 16, 2001	Socorro	LINEAR	·	1.7 km	MPC · JPL
146498	2001 SK_{30}	—	September 16, 2001	Socorro	LINEAR	·	2.5 km	MPC · JPL
146499	2001 SP_{36}	—	September 16, 2001	Socorro	LINEAR	JUN	2.0 km	MPC · JPL
146500	2001 SM_{37}	—	September 16, 2001	Socorro	LINEAR	·	2.3 km	MPC · JPL

== 146501–146600 ==
back to top

Designation			Discovery			Properties		Ref
Permanent	Provisional	Named after	Date	Site	Discoverer(s)	Category	Diam.	Ref
146501	2001 SD_{41}	—	September 16, 2001	Socorro	LINEAR	MAR	1.8 km	MPC · JPL
146502	2001 SF_{41}	—	September 16, 2001	Socorro	LINEAR	·	2.3 km	MPC · JPL
146503	2001 SZ_{42}	—	September 16, 2001	Socorro	LINEAR	·	2.0 km	MPC · JPL
146504	2001 SH_{45}	—	September 16, 2001	Socorro	LINEAR	·	3.3 km	MPC · JPL
146505	2001 SY_{52}	—	September 16, 2001	Socorro	LINEAR	·	2.5 km	MPC · JPL
146506	2001 SF_{56}	—	September 16, 2001	Socorro	LINEAR	·	3.3 km	MPC · JPL
146507	2001 SP_{58}	—	September 17, 2001	Socorro	LINEAR	·	5.1 km	MPC · JPL
146508	2001 SH_{65}	—	September 17, 2001	Socorro	LINEAR	·	4.2 km	MPC · JPL
146509	2001 SY_{74}	—	September 19, 2001	Anderson Mesa	LONEOS	·	4.0 km	MPC · JPL
146510	2001 SD_{81}	—	September 20, 2001	Socorro	LINEAR	·	2.7 km	MPC · JPL
146511	2001 SE_{81}	—	September 20, 2001	Socorro	LINEAR	·	2.3 km	MPC · JPL
146512	2001 SM_{92}	—	September 20, 2001	Socorro	LINEAR	·	1.4 km	MPC · JPL
146513	2001 SA_{98}	—	September 20, 2001	Socorro	LINEAR	·	3.0 km	MPC · JPL
146514	2001 SX_{118}	—	September 16, 2001	Socorro	LINEAR	·	2.0 km	MPC · JPL
146515	2001 SJ_{124}	—	September 16, 2001	Socorro	LINEAR	·	2.1 km	MPC · JPL
146516	2001 SD_{133}	—	September 16, 2001	Socorro	LINEAR	EUN	2.3 km	MPC · JPL
146517	2001 SL_{135}	—	September 16, 2001	Socorro	LINEAR	·	3.3 km	MPC · JPL
146518	2001 SX_{139}	—	September 16, 2001	Socorro	LINEAR	·	2.8 km	MPC · JPL
146519	2001 ST_{142}	—	September 16, 2001	Socorro	LINEAR	·	2.6 km	MPC · JPL
146520	2001 SM_{143}	—	September 16, 2001	Socorro	LINEAR	·	3.0 km	MPC · JPL
146521	2001 SX_{145}	—	September 16, 2001	Socorro	LINEAR	·	2.0 km	MPC · JPL
146522	2001 SC_{149}	—	September 17, 2001	Socorro	LINEAR	·	3.3 km	MPC · JPL
146523	2001 SP_{149}	—	September 17, 2001	Socorro	LINEAR	·	2.2 km	MPC · JPL
146524	2001 SY_{154}	—	September 17, 2001	Socorro	LINEAR	GEF	2.5 km	MPC · JPL
146525	2001 SO_{155}	—	September 17, 2001	Socorro	LINEAR	·	3.0 km	MPC · JPL
146526	2001 SX_{156}	—	September 17, 2001	Socorro	LINEAR	·	2.2 km	MPC · JPL
146527	2001 SX_{158}	—	September 17, 2001	Socorro	LINEAR	·	3.4 km	MPC · JPL
146528	2001 SE_{159}	—	September 17, 2001	Socorro	LINEAR	WIT	1.4 km	MPC · JPL
146529	2001 SD_{161}	—	September 17, 2001	Socorro	LINEAR	·	3.3 km	MPC · JPL
146530	2001 SK_{180}	—	September 19, 2001	Socorro	LINEAR	·	1.8 km	MPC · JPL
146531	2001 SW_{187}	—	September 19, 2001	Socorro	LINEAR	·	1.5 km	MPC · JPL
146532	2001 SM_{191}	—	September 19, 2001	Socorro	LINEAR	·	2.1 km	MPC · JPL
146533	2001 SM_{208}	—	September 19, 2001	Socorro	LINEAR	·	2.9 km	MPC · JPL
146534	2001 SX_{223}	—	September 19, 2001	Socorro	LINEAR	PAD	3.3 km	MPC · JPL
146535	2001 SY_{226}	—	September 19, 2001	Socorro	LINEAR	·	2.2 km	MPC · JPL
146536	2001 SZ_{226}	—	September 19, 2001	Socorro	LINEAR	KOR	2.5 km	MPC · JPL
146537	2001 SP_{231}	—	September 19, 2001	Socorro	LINEAR	KOR	2.6 km	MPC · JPL
146538	2001 SJ_{245}	—	September 19, 2001	Socorro	LINEAR	·	3.4 km	MPC · JPL
146539	2001 SG_{251}	—	September 19, 2001	Socorro	LINEAR	·	2.5 km	MPC · JPL
146540	2001 SQ_{251}	—	September 19, 2001	Socorro	LINEAR	·	2.7 km	MPC · JPL
146541	2001 SQ_{256}	—	September 19, 2001	Socorro	LINEAR	·	2.7 km	MPC · JPL
146542	2001 SD_{266}	—	September 25, 2001	Desert Eagle	W. K. Y. Yeung	·	2.0 km	MPC · JPL
146543	2001 SC_{277}	—	September 21, 2001	Palomar	NEAT	·	4.4 km	MPC · JPL
146544	2001 SE_{277}	—	September 26, 2001	Socorro	LINEAR	·	7.5 km	MPC · JPL
146545	2001 SC_{278}	—	September 21, 2001	Anderson Mesa	LONEOS	·	3.9 km	MPC · JPL
146546	2001 SC_{279}	—	September 21, 2001	Anderson Mesa	LONEOS	·	4.0 km	MPC · JPL
146547	2001 SR_{282}	—	September 21, 2001	Socorro	LINEAR	·	3.2 km	MPC · JPL
146548	2001 SU_{285}	—	September 28, 2001	Fountain Hills	C. W. Juels, P. R. Holvorcem	·	7.6 km	MPC · JPL
146549	2001 SK_{287}	—	September 21, 2001	Palomar	NEAT	·	3.3 km	MPC · JPL
146550	2001 SB_{292}	—	September 23, 2001	Anderson Mesa	LONEOS	MAR	2.1 km	MPC · JPL
146551	2001 SP_{301}	—	September 20, 2001	Socorro	LINEAR	·	2.3 km	MPC · JPL
146552	2001 ST_{303}	—	September 20, 2001	Socorro	LINEAR	·	2.1 km	MPC · JPL
146553	2001 SX_{304}	—	September 20, 2001	Socorro	LINEAR	·	2.8 km	MPC · JPL
146554	2001 SE_{315}	—	September 25, 2001	Socorro	LINEAR	·	4.6 km	MPC · JPL
146555	2001 SL_{317}	—	September 19, 2001	Socorro	LINEAR	·	3.6 km	MPC · JPL
146556	2001 SJ_{318}	—	September 20, 2001	Socorro	LINEAR	·	2.2 km	MPC · JPL
146557	2001 SR_{318}	—	September 21, 2001	Socorro	LINEAR	·	2.2 km	MPC · JPL
146558	2001 SQ_{338}	—	September 20, 2001	Powell	Powell	·	2.7 km	MPC · JPL
146559	2001 SH_{345}	—	September 23, 2001	Anderson Mesa	LONEOS	526	3.8 km	MPC · JPL
146560	2001 SJ_{350}	—	September 20, 2001	Socorro	LINEAR	·	2.0 km	MPC · JPL
146561	2001 TC_{4}	—	October 7, 2001	Palomar	NEAT	·	2.4 km	MPC · JPL
146562	2001 TY_{6}	—	October 10, 2001	Palomar	NEAT	·	1.9 km	MPC · JPL
146563	2001 TB_{7}	—	October 10, 2001	Palomar	NEAT	·	1.9 km	MPC · JPL
146564	2001 TT_{19}	—	October 9, 2001	Socorro	LINEAR	GEF	2.0 km	MPC · JPL
146565	2001 TU_{21}	—	October 11, 2001	Socorro	LINEAR	·	3.2 km	MPC · JPL
146566	2001 TF_{29}	—	October 14, 2001	Socorro	LINEAR	·	2.6 km	MPC · JPL
146567	2001 TW_{48}	—	October 15, 2001	Socorro	LINEAR	·	3.9 km	MPC · JPL
146568	2001 TW_{54}	—	October 14, 2001	Socorro	LINEAR	·	2.0 km	MPC · JPL
146569	2001 TM_{59}	—	October 13, 2001	Socorro	LINEAR	·	2.2 km	MPC · JPL
146570	2001 TK_{60}	—	October 13, 2001	Socorro	LINEAR	·	3.4 km	MPC · JPL
146571	2001 TR_{65}	—	October 13, 2001	Socorro	LINEAR	·	2.8 km	MPC · JPL
146572	2001 TF_{68}	—	October 13, 2001	Socorro	LINEAR	·	3.0 km	MPC · JPL
146573	2001 TS_{68}	—	October 13, 2001	Socorro	LINEAR	·	2.8 km	MPC · JPL
146574	2001 TT_{69}	—	October 13, 2001	Socorro	LINEAR	·	3.0 km	MPC · JPL
146575	2001 TR_{74}	—	October 13, 2001	Socorro	LINEAR	MAR	2.3 km	MPC · JPL
146576	2001 TZ_{77}	—	October 13, 2001	Socorro	LINEAR	·	4.9 km	MPC · JPL
146577	2001 TP_{78}	—	October 13, 2001	Socorro	LINEAR	·	3.8 km	MPC · JPL
146578	2001 TX_{87}	—	October 14, 2001	Socorro	LINEAR	PAD	3.0 km	MPC · JPL
146579	2001 TF_{88}	—	October 14, 2001	Socorro	LINEAR	·	4.0 km	MPC · JPL
146580	2001 TC_{89}	—	October 14, 2001	Socorro	LINEAR	·	2.2 km	MPC · JPL
146581	2001 TU_{94}	—	October 14, 2001	Socorro	LINEAR	·	2.8 km	MPC · JPL
146582	2001 TA_{99}	—	October 14, 2001	Socorro	LINEAR	·	3.1 km	MPC · JPL
146583	2001 TK_{99}	—	October 14, 2001	Socorro	LINEAR	·	2.9 km	MPC · JPL
146584	2001 TQ_{101}	—	October 15, 2001	Socorro	LINEAR	·	3.8 km	MPC · JPL
146585	2001 TY_{103}	—	October 15, 2001	Desert Eagle	W. K. Y. Yeung	·	3.4 km	MPC · JPL
146586	2001 TE_{123}	—	October 6, 2001	Palomar	NEAT	ADE	4.3 km	MPC · JPL
146587	2001 TJ_{125}	—	October 12, 2001	Haleakala	NEAT	·	4.9 km	MPC · JPL
146588	2001 TC_{127}	—	October 13, 2001	Kitt Peak	Spacewatch	·	2.7 km	MPC · JPL
146589	2001 TS_{138}	—	October 10, 2001	Palomar	NEAT	·	2.5 km	MPC · JPL
146590	2001 TU_{140}	—	October 10, 2001	Palomar	NEAT	·	2.3 km	MPC · JPL
146591	2001 TH_{143}	—	October 10, 2001	Palomar	NEAT	·	2.3 km	MPC · JPL
146592	2001 TQ_{143}	—	October 10, 2001	Palomar	NEAT	·	2.2 km	MPC · JPL
146593	2001 TD_{153}	—	October 11, 2001	Palomar	NEAT	·	2.6 km	MPC · JPL
146594	2001 TN_{153}	—	October 11, 2001	Palomar	NEAT	·	1.8 km	MPC · JPL
146595	2001 TB_{157}	—	October 14, 2001	Kitt Peak	Spacewatch	·	2.2 km	MPC · JPL
146596	2001 TW_{159}	—	October 13, 2001	Palomar	NEAT	EUN	2.0 km	MPC · JPL
146597	2001 TA_{160}	—	October 15, 2001	Palomar	NEAT	·	6.2 km	MPC · JPL
146598	2001 TQ_{166}	—	October 15, 2001	Socorro	LINEAR	BRA	3.3 km	MPC · JPL
146599	2001 TK_{168}	—	October 15, 2001	Socorro	LINEAR	GEF	2.5 km	MPC · JPL
146600	2001 TJ_{169}	—	October 15, 2001	Socorro	LINEAR	·	3.3 km	MPC · JPL

== 146601–146700 ==
back to top

Designation			Discovery			Properties		Ref
Permanent	Provisional	Named after	Date	Site	Discoverer(s)	Category	Diam.	Ref
146601	2001 TS_{178}	—	October 14, 2001	Socorro	LINEAR	·	2.9 km	MPC · JPL
146602	2001 TW_{188}	—	October 14, 2001	Socorro	LINEAR	·	4.0 km	MPC · JPL
146603	2001 TC_{192}	—	October 14, 2001	Socorro	LINEAR	·	2.9 km	MPC · JPL
146604	2001 TC_{194}	—	October 15, 2001	Socorro	LINEAR	·	3.0 km	MPC · JPL
146605	2001 TO_{194}	—	October 15, 2001	Socorro	LINEAR	EUN	2.8 km	MPC · JPL
146606	2001 TJ_{196}	—	October 14, 2001	Palomar	NEAT	·	2.6 km	MPC · JPL
146607	2001 TD_{197}	—	October 14, 2001	Socorro	LINEAR	·	2.9 km	MPC · JPL
146608	2001 TO_{200}	—	October 11, 2001	Socorro	LINEAR	·	3.1 km	MPC · JPL
146609	2001 TS_{200}	—	October 11, 2001	Socorro	LINEAR	·	4.7 km	MPC · JPL
146610	2001 TB_{203}	—	October 11, 2001	Socorro	LINEAR	·	3.7 km	MPC · JPL
146611	2001 TB_{205}	—	October 11, 2001	Socorro	LINEAR	·	3.0 km	MPC · JPL
146612	2001 TJ_{208}	—	October 11, 2001	Kitt Peak	Spacewatch	·	3.2 km	MPC · JPL
146613	2001 TA_{211}	—	October 13, 2001	Palomar	NEAT	·	3.0 km	MPC · JPL
146614	2001 TP_{211}	—	October 13, 2001	Haleakala	NEAT	·	2.8 km	MPC · JPL
146615	2001 TK_{212}	—	October 13, 2001	Anderson Mesa	LONEOS	(32418)	3.3 km	MPC · JPL
146616	2001 TS_{213}	—	October 13, 2001	Palomar	NEAT	·	2.8 km	MPC · JPL
146617	2001 TJ_{222}	—	October 14, 2001	Socorro	LINEAR	·	3.3 km	MPC · JPL
146618	2001 TV_{226}	—	October 14, 2001	Palomar	NEAT	EUN	2.1 km	MPC · JPL
146619	2001 TD_{227}	—	October 15, 2001	Kitt Peak	Spacewatch	·	3.6 km	MPC · JPL
146620	2001 TK_{229}	—	October 15, 2001	Palomar	NEAT	MAR	2.0 km	MPC · JPL
146621	2001 TX_{229}	—	October 15, 2001	Desert Eagle	W. K. Y. Yeung	NEM	3.2 km	MPC · JPL
146622	2001 TX_{231}	—	October 15, 2001	Kitt Peak	Spacewatch	·	2.4 km	MPC · JPL
146623	2001 TB_{237}	—	October 8, 2001	Palomar	NEAT	MAR	2.1 km	MPC · JPL
146624	2001 TR_{256}	—	October 11, 2001	Palomar	NEAT	·	3.0 km	MPC · JPL
146625	2001 TC_{257}	—	October 14, 2001	Socorro	LINEAR	·	5.1 km	MPC · JPL
146626	2001 UN_{3}	—	October 16, 2001	Socorro	LINEAR	·	3.9 km	MPC · JPL
146627	2001 UD_{12}	—	October 23, 2001	Desert Eagle	W. K. Y. Yeung	T_{j} (2.99) · EUP	10 km	MPC · JPL
146628	2001 UJ_{12}	—	October 24, 2001	Desert Eagle	W. K. Y. Yeung	·	2.6 km	MPC · JPL
146629	2001 UX_{19}	—	October 16, 2001	Palomar	NEAT	·	4.2 km	MPC · JPL
146630	2001 UU_{23}	—	October 18, 2001	Socorro	LINEAR	·	4.2 km	MPC · JPL
146631	2001 UJ_{34}	—	October 16, 2001	Socorro	LINEAR	EUN	2.8 km	MPC · JPL
146632	2001 UG_{35}	—	October 16, 2001	Socorro	LINEAR	GEF	2.4 km	MPC · JPL
146633	2001 UG_{38}	—	October 17, 2001	Socorro	LINEAR	·	2.6 km	MPC · JPL
146634	2001 US_{42}	—	October 17, 2001	Socorro	LINEAR	·	2.3 km	MPC · JPL
146635	2001 UM_{44}	—	October 17, 2001	Socorro	LINEAR	·	4.5 km	MPC · JPL
146636	2001 UV_{45}	—	October 17, 2001	Socorro	LINEAR	·	3.1 km	MPC · JPL
146637	2001 UP_{47}	—	October 17, 2001	Socorro	LINEAR	·	2.2 km	MPC · JPL
146638	2001 UV_{51}	—	October 17, 2001	Socorro	LINEAR	·	3.3 km	MPC · JPL
146639	2001 UH_{53}	—	October 17, 2001	Socorro	LINEAR	·	4.1 km	MPC · JPL
146640	2001 UR_{61}	—	October 17, 2001	Socorro	LINEAR	·	2.2 km	MPC · JPL
146641	2001 US_{73}	—	October 17, 2001	Socorro	LINEAR	AGN	2.4 km	MPC · JPL
146642	2001 UF_{74}	—	October 17, 2001	Socorro	LINEAR	·	2.9 km	MPC · JPL
146643	2001 UZ_{74}	—	October 17, 2001	Socorro	LINEAR	EUN	2.1 km	MPC · JPL
146644	2001 UA_{76}	—	October 17, 2001	Socorro	LINEAR	·	3.8 km	MPC · JPL
146645	2001 US_{79}	—	October 20, 2001	Socorro	LINEAR	·	2.3 km	MPC · JPL
146646	2001 UZ_{79}	—	October 20, 2001	Socorro	LINEAR	(11882)	2.7 km	MPC · JPL
146647	2001 UA_{80}	—	October 20, 2001	Socorro	LINEAR	·	2.0 km	MPC · JPL
146648	2001 UM_{80}	—	October 20, 2001	Socorro	LINEAR	·	2.5 km	MPC · JPL
146649	2001 UD_{89}	—	October 20, 2001	Haleakala	NEAT	ADE	3.6 km	MPC · JPL
146650	2001 UO_{92}	—	October 18, 2001	Palomar	NEAT	·	3.5 km	MPC · JPL
146651	2001 UD_{94}	—	October 19, 2001	Haleakala	NEAT	·	4.8 km	MPC · JPL
146652	2001 UZ_{99}	—	October 17, 2001	Socorro	LINEAR	·	3.4 km	MPC · JPL
146653	2001 UD_{101}	—	October 20, 2001	Socorro	LINEAR	·	2.3 km	MPC · JPL
146654	2001 UG_{101}	—	October 20, 2001	Socorro	LINEAR	·	2.3 km	MPC · JPL
146655	2001 UV_{104}	—	October 20, 2001	Socorro	LINEAR	·	5.1 km	MPC · JPL
146656	2001 US_{105}	—	October 20, 2001	Socorro	LINEAR	AST	3.4 km	MPC · JPL
146657	2001 UB_{114}	—	October 22, 2001	Socorro	LINEAR	KOR	2.0 km	MPC · JPL
146658	2001 UJ_{114}	—	October 22, 2001	Socorro	LINEAR	·	4.3 km	MPC · JPL
146659	2001 UD_{122}	—	October 22, 2001	Socorro	LINEAR	·	4.0 km	MPC · JPL
146660	2001 UP_{129}	—	October 20, 2001	Socorro	LINEAR	·	3.1 km	MPC · JPL
146661	2001 UW_{129}	—	October 20, 2001	Socorro	LINEAR	MAS	1.3 km	MPC · JPL
146662	2001 UK_{133}	—	October 21, 2001	Socorro	LINEAR	·	2.2 km	MPC · JPL
146663	2001 UD_{137}	—	October 23, 2001	Socorro	LINEAR	HOF	4.2 km	MPC · JPL
146664	2001 UK_{141}	—	October 23, 2001	Socorro	LINEAR	GEF	1.9 km	MPC · JPL
146665	2001 UF_{151}	—	October 23, 2001	Socorro	LINEAR	·	3.3 km	MPC · JPL
146666	2001 UW_{162}	—	October 23, 2001	Socorro	LINEAR	·	3.3 km	MPC · JPL
146667	2001 UW_{163}	—	October 17, 2001	Palomar	NEAT	·	2.8 km	MPC · JPL
146668	2001 UG_{168}	—	October 19, 2001	Socorro	LINEAR	·	3.0 km	MPC · JPL
146669	2001 UO_{173}	—	October 18, 2001	Palomar	NEAT	·	2.6 km	MPC · JPL
146670	2001 UT_{174}	—	October 18, 2001	Palomar	NEAT	·	3.0 km	MPC · JPL
146671	2001 UH_{185}	—	October 17, 2001	Socorro	LINEAR	·	3.0 km	MPC · JPL
146672	2001 UH_{201}	—	October 19, 2001	Palomar	NEAT	·	2.0 km	MPC · JPL
146673	2001 UM_{204}	—	October 19, 2001	Palomar	NEAT	AGN	1.7 km	MPC · JPL
146674	2001 UL_{205}	—	October 19, 2001	Palomar	NEAT	AGN	1.9 km	MPC · JPL
146675	2001 UV_{214}	—	October 23, 2001	Socorro	LINEAR	·	2.0 km	MPC · JPL
146676	2001 UG_{216}	—	October 24, 2001	Palomar	NEAT	·	3.7 km	MPC · JPL
146677	2001 UR_{217}	—	October 24, 2001	Socorro	LINEAR	·	3.2 km	MPC · JPL
146678	2001 UE_{221}	—	October 23, 2001	Socorro	LINEAR	AST	4.0 km	MPC · JPL
146679	2001 UF_{224}	—	October 28, 2001	Palomar	NEAT	·	5.3 km	MPC · JPL
146680	2001 VQ_{7}	—	November 9, 2001	Socorro	LINEAR	·	2.0 km	MPC · JPL
146681	2001 VU_{11}	—	November 10, 2001	Socorro	LINEAR	BRA	3.5 km	MPC · JPL
146682	2001 VT_{12}	—	November 10, 2001	Socorro	LINEAR	·	2.7 km	MPC · JPL
146683	2001 VB_{19}	—	November 9, 2001	Socorro	LINEAR	·	3.8 km	MPC · JPL
146684	2001 VN_{20}	—	November 9, 2001	Socorro	LINEAR	(5)	2.5 km	MPC · JPL
146685	2001 VG_{26}	—	November 9, 2001	Socorro	LINEAR	·	3.5 km	MPC · JPL
146686	2001 VW_{37}	—	November 9, 2001	Socorro	LINEAR	·	2.0 km	MPC · JPL
146687	2001 VC_{39}	—	November 9, 2001	Socorro	LINEAR	·	3.1 km	MPC · JPL
146688	2001 VG_{48}	—	November 9, 2001	Socorro	LINEAR	·	2.6 km	MPC · JPL
146689	2001 VB_{56}	—	November 10, 2001	Socorro	LINEAR	·	2.5 km	MPC · JPL
146690	2001 VB_{58}	—	November 10, 2001	Socorro	LINEAR	·	3.2 km	MPC · JPL
146691	2001 VC_{61}	—	November 10, 2001	Socorro	LINEAR	·	2.5 km	MPC · JPL
146692	2001 VV_{67}	—	November 11, 2001	Socorro	LINEAR	·	2.8 km	MPC · JPL
146693	2001 VA_{69}	—	November 11, 2001	Socorro	LINEAR	·	2.5 km	MPC · JPL
146694	2001 VJ_{69}	—	November 11, 2001	Socorro	LINEAR	·	4.4 km	MPC · JPL
146695	2001 VG_{71}	—	November 11, 2001	Socorro	LINEAR	H	1.5 km	MPC · JPL
146696	2001 VZ_{71}	—	November 12, 2001	Kvistaberg	Uppsala-DLR Asteroid Survey	·	2.8 km	MPC · JPL
146697	2001 VU_{73}	—	November 11, 2001	Socorro	LINEAR	·	2.9 km	MPC · JPL
146698	2001 VY_{87}	—	November 12, 2001	Haleakala	NEAT	·	2.8 km	MPC · JPL
146699	2001 VP_{100}	—	November 12, 2001	Anderson Mesa	LONEOS	·	5.2 km	MPC · JPL
146700	2001 VU_{100}	—	November 12, 2001	Socorro	LINEAR	·	3.3 km	MPC · JPL

== 146701–146800 ==
back to top

Designation			Discovery			Properties		Ref
Permanent	Provisional	Named after	Date	Site	Discoverer(s)	Category	Diam.	Ref
146701	2001 VJ_{101}	—	November 12, 2001	Socorro	LINEAR	HOF	5.3 km	MPC · JPL
146702	2001 VA_{109}	—	November 12, 2001	Socorro	LINEAR	·	2.3 km	MPC · JPL
146703	2001 VY_{112}	—	November 12, 2001	Socorro	LINEAR	AGN	2.0 km	MPC · JPL
146704	2001 VU_{113}	—	November 12, 2001	Socorro	LINEAR	KOR	2.2 km	MPC · JPL
146705	2001 VM_{125}	—	November 11, 2001	Kitt Peak	Spacewatch	·	3.7 km	MPC · JPL
146706	2001 WM_{6}	—	November 17, 2001	Socorro	LINEAR	GEF	2.2 km	MPC · JPL
146707	2001 WN_{6}	—	November 17, 2001	Socorro	LINEAR	·	7.1 km	MPC · JPL
146708	2001 WT_{6}	—	November 17, 2001	Socorro	LINEAR	·	2.7 km	MPC · JPL
146709	2001 WV_{11}	—	November 17, 2001	Socorro	LINEAR	WIT	1.8 km	MPC · JPL
146710	2001 WA_{13}	—	November 17, 2001	Socorro	LINEAR	PAD	2.8 km	MPC · JPL
146711	2001 WN_{13}	—	November 17, 2001	Socorro	LINEAR	·	3.1 km	MPC · JPL
146712	2001 WQ_{20}	—	November 17, 2001	Socorro	LINEAR	·	4.0 km	MPC · JPL
146713	2001 WZ_{26}	—	November 17, 2001	Socorro	LINEAR	·	4.1 km	MPC · JPL
146714	2001 WM_{28}	—	November 17, 2001	Socorro	LINEAR	·	3.4 km	MPC · JPL
146715	2001 WV_{34}	—	November 17, 2001	Socorro	LINEAR	·	3.9 km	MPC · JPL
146716	2001 WA_{51}	—	November 19, 2001	Socorro	LINEAR	·	2.1 km	MPC · JPL
146717	2001 WU_{62}	—	November 19, 2001	Socorro	LINEAR	·	2.7 km	MPC · JPL
146718	2001 WJ_{78}	—	November 20, 2001	Socorro	LINEAR	·	2.4 km	MPC · JPL
146719	2001 WQ_{83}	—	November 20, 2001	Socorro	LINEAR	fast	3.2 km	MPC · JPL
146720	2001 WC_{87}	—	November 19, 2001	Socorro	LINEAR	LEO	3.1 km	MPC · JPL
146721	2001 XF_{8}	—	December 8, 2001	Socorro	LINEAR	THM	4.4 km	MPC · JPL
146722	2001 XA_{9}	—	December 9, 2001	Socorro	LINEAR	·	3.5 km	MPC · JPL
146723	2001 XN_{11}	—	December 9, 2001	Socorro	LINEAR	HNS	2.8 km	MPC · JPL
146724	2001 XC_{24}	—	December 10, 2001	Socorro	LINEAR	·	5.4 km	MPC · JPL
146725	2001 XG_{30}	—	December 11, 2001	Socorro	LINEAR	H	1.2 km	MPC · JPL
146726	2001 XT_{33}	—	December 7, 2001	Socorro	LINEAR	AGN	1.8 km	MPC · JPL
146727	2001 XD_{35}	—	December 9, 2001	Socorro	LINEAR	EUN	2.7 km	MPC · JPL
146728	2001 XU_{36}	—	December 9, 2001	Socorro	LINEAR	·	3.6 km	MPC · JPL
146729	2001 XW_{37}	—	December 14, 2001	Socorro	LINEAR	·	7.4 km	MPC · JPL
146730	2001 XD_{45}	—	December 9, 2001	Socorro	LINEAR	EOS	2.8 km	MPC · JPL
146731	2001 XE_{51}	—	December 10, 2001	Socorro	LINEAR	AST	3.1 km	MPC · JPL
146732	2001 XH_{51}	—	December 10, 2001	Socorro	LINEAR	AST	3.1 km	MPC · JPL
146733	2001 XE_{52}	—	December 10, 2001	Socorro	LINEAR	·	7.2 km	MPC · JPL
146734	2001 XG_{55}	—	December 10, 2001	Socorro	LINEAR	AGN	2.1 km	MPC · JPL
146735	2001 XQ_{63}	—	December 10, 2001	Socorro	LINEAR	·	3.1 km	MPC · JPL
146736	2001 XS_{71}	—	December 11, 2001	Socorro	LINEAR	·	3.7 km	MPC · JPL
146737	2001 XK_{73}	—	December 11, 2001	Socorro	LINEAR	·	5.4 km	MPC · JPL
146738	2001 XL_{81}	—	December 11, 2001	Socorro	LINEAR	615	3.3 km	MPC · JPL
146739	2001 XQ_{86}	—	December 11, 2001	Socorro	LINEAR	·	3.3 km	MPC · JPL
146740	2001 XC_{89}	—	December 10, 2001	Socorro	LINEAR	EOS	3.8 km	MPC · JPL
146741	2001 XD_{93}	—	December 10, 2001	Socorro	LINEAR	AGN	1.8 km	MPC · JPL
146742	2001 XS_{110}	—	December 11, 2001	Socorro	LINEAR	·	3.2 km	MPC · JPL
146743	2001 XX_{116}	—	December 13, 2001	Socorro	LINEAR	·	4.2 km	MPC · JPL
146744	2001 XZ_{118}	—	December 13, 2001	Socorro	LINEAR	·	4.4 km	MPC · JPL
146745	2001 XV_{129}	—	December 14, 2001	Socorro	LINEAR	DOR	4.7 km	MPC · JPL
146746	2001 XO_{131}	—	December 14, 2001	Socorro	LINEAR	KOR	2.1 km	MPC · JPL
146747	2001 XV_{132}	—	December 14, 2001	Socorro	LINEAR	·	4.3 km	MPC · JPL
146748	2001 XB_{136}	—	December 14, 2001	Socorro	LINEAR	AGN	1.8 km	MPC · JPL
146749	2001 XL_{136}	—	December 14, 2001	Socorro	LINEAR	·	5.4 km	MPC · JPL
146750	2001 XN_{141}	—	December 14, 2001	Socorro	LINEAR	(21344)	3.0 km	MPC · JPL
146751	2001 XO_{141}	—	December 14, 2001	Socorro	LINEAR	·	2.7 km	MPC · JPL
146752	2001 XU_{143}	—	December 14, 2001	Socorro	LINEAR	KOR	2.2 km	MPC · JPL
146753	2001 XX_{145}	—	December 14, 2001	Socorro	LINEAR	KOR	2.6 km	MPC · JPL
146754	2001 XT_{147}	—	December 14, 2001	Socorro	LINEAR	·	3.4 km	MPC · JPL
146755	2001 XM_{152}	—	December 14, 2001	Socorro	LINEAR	·	2.4 km	MPC · JPL
146756	2001 XP_{159}	—	December 14, 2001	Socorro	LINEAR	EMA	5.8 km	MPC · JPL
146757	2001 XB_{163}	—	December 14, 2001	Socorro	LINEAR	KOR	2.8 km	MPC · JPL
146758	2001 XX_{164}	—	December 14, 2001	Socorro	LINEAR	·	3.7 km	MPC · JPL
146759	2001 XP_{167}	—	December 14, 2001	Socorro	LINEAR	KOR ·	2.9 km	MPC · JPL
146760	2001 XZ_{170}	—	December 14, 2001	Socorro	LINEAR	THM	3.9 km	MPC · JPL
146761	2001 XH_{180}	—	December 14, 2001	Socorro	LINEAR	·	2.8 km	MPC · JPL
146762	2001 XW_{184}	—	December 14, 2001	Socorro	LINEAR	·	5.4 km	MPC · JPL
146763	2001 XF_{193}	—	December 14, 2001	Socorro	LINEAR	·	4.2 km	MPC · JPL
146764	2001 XX_{194}	—	December 14, 2001	Socorro	LINEAR	·	5.4 km	MPC · JPL
146765	2001 XE_{199}	—	December 14, 2001	Socorro	LINEAR	·	4.9 km	MPC · JPL
146766	2001 XU_{201}	—	December 14, 2001	Kitt Peak	Spacewatch	(12739)	2.2 km	MPC · JPL
146767	2001 XC_{202}	—	December 5, 2001	Haleakala	NEAT	·	2.8 km	MPC · JPL
146768	2001 XU_{203}	—	December 11, 2001	Socorro	LINEAR	AGN	2.2 km	MPC · JPL
146769	2001 XX_{215}	—	December 14, 2001	Socorro	LINEAR	·	5.2 km	MPC · JPL
146770	2001 XN_{217}	—	December 14, 2001	Socorro	LINEAR	·	3.5 km	MPC · JPL
146771	2001 XO_{220}	—	December 15, 2001	Socorro	LINEAR	·	3.3 km	MPC · JPL
146772	2001 XD_{221}	—	December 15, 2001	Socorro	LINEAR	·	3.5 km	MPC · JPL
146773	2001 XO_{221}	—	December 15, 2001	Socorro	LINEAR	·	4.4 km	MPC · JPL
146774	2001 XK_{224}	—	December 15, 2001	Socorro	LINEAR	·	2.9 km	MPC · JPL
146775	2001 XD_{226}	—	December 15, 2001	Socorro	LINEAR	HOF	4.0 km	MPC · JPL
146776	2001 XO_{230}	—	December 15, 2001	Socorro	LINEAR	·	3.1 km	MPC · JPL
146777	2001 XT_{230}	—	December 15, 2001	Socorro	LINEAR	·	4.4 km	MPC · JPL
146778	2001 XX_{231}	—	December 15, 2001	Socorro	LINEAR	·	3.6 km	MPC · JPL
146779	2001 XK_{234}	—	December 15, 2001	Socorro	LINEAR	GEF	2.3 km	MPC · JPL
146780	2001 XK_{235}	—	December 15, 2001	Socorro	LINEAR	·	3.2 km	MPC · JPL
146781	2001 XM_{235}	—	December 15, 2001	Socorro	LINEAR	·	3.7 km	MPC · JPL
146782	2001 XQ_{241}	—	December 14, 2001	Socorro	LINEAR	·	2.8 km	MPC · JPL
146783	2001 XR_{241}	—	December 14, 2001	Socorro	LINEAR	KOR	2.2 km	MPC · JPL
146784	2001 XE_{245}	—	December 15, 2001	Socorro	LINEAR	·	3.3 km	MPC · JPL
146785	2001 XA_{253}	—	December 14, 2001	Socorro	LINEAR	LIX	7.7 km	MPC · JPL
146786	2001 XF_{267}	—	December 9, 2001	Socorro	LINEAR	·	5.3 km	MPC · JPL
146787	2001 YB_{9}	—	December 17, 2001	Socorro	LINEAR	·	3.9 km	MPC · JPL
146788	2001 YS_{9}	—	December 17, 2001	Socorro	LINEAR	·	4.7 km	MPC · JPL
146789	2001 YW_{16}	—	December 17, 2001	Socorro	LINEAR	·	2.8 km	MPC · JPL
146790	2001 YZ_{19}	—	December 18, 2001	Socorro	LINEAR	·	2.9 km	MPC · JPL
146791	2001 YA_{22}	—	December 18, 2001	Socorro	LINEAR	·	3.1 km	MPC · JPL
146792	2001 YK_{24}	—	December 18, 2001	Socorro	LINEAR	·	3.3 km	MPC · JPL
146793	2001 YP_{30}	—	December 18, 2001	Socorro	LINEAR	BRA	3.2 km	MPC · JPL
146794	2001 YB_{35}	—	December 18, 2001	Socorro	LINEAR	·	4.0 km	MPC · JPL
146795	2001 YY_{36}	—	December 18, 2001	Socorro	LINEAR	EOS	3.4 km	MPC · JPL
146796	2001 YA_{42}	—	December 18, 2001	Socorro	LINEAR	·	3.2 km	MPC · JPL
146797	2001 YZ_{42}	—	December 18, 2001	Socorro	LINEAR	·	3.0 km	MPC · JPL
146798	2001 YT_{43}	—	December 18, 2001	Socorro	LINEAR	HOF	4.6 km	MPC · JPL
146799	2001 YV_{45}	—	December 18, 2001	Socorro	LINEAR	NEM	3.6 km	MPC · JPL
146800	2001 YW_{45}	—	December 18, 2001	Socorro	LINEAR	BRA	2.5 km	MPC · JPL

== 146801–146900 ==
back to top

Designation			Discovery			Properties		Ref
Permanent	Provisional	Named after	Date	Site	Discoverer(s)	Category	Diam.	Ref
146801	2001 YS_{46}	—	December 18, 2001	Socorro	LINEAR	·	4.4 km	MPC · JPL
146802	2001 YG_{48}	—	December 18, 2001	Socorro	LINEAR	AGN	2.3 km	MPC · JPL
146803	2001 YL_{50}	—	December 18, 2001	Socorro	LINEAR	KOR	2.5 km	MPC · JPL
146804	2001 YP_{56}	—	December 18, 2001	Socorro	LINEAR	·	3.0 km	MPC · JPL
146805	2001 YR_{69}	—	December 18, 2001	Socorro	LINEAR	·	5.1 km	MPC · JPL
146806	2001 YT_{69}	—	December 18, 2001	Socorro	LINEAR	KOR	2.2 km	MPC · JPL
146807	2001 YF_{75}	—	December 18, 2001	Socorro	LINEAR	EOS	3.5 km	MPC · JPL
146808	2001 YW_{81}	—	December 18, 2001	Socorro	LINEAR	EOS	3.6 km	MPC · JPL
146809	2001 YZ_{81}	—	December 18, 2001	Socorro	LINEAR	·	3.1 km	MPC · JPL
146810	2001 YE_{82}	—	December 18, 2001	Socorro	LINEAR	·	4.7 km	MPC · JPL
146811	2001 YD_{90}	—	December 18, 2001	Socorro	LINEAR	·	7.4 km	MPC · JPL
146812	2001 YP_{92}	—	December 17, 2001	Kitt Peak	Spacewatch	KOR	2.2 km	MPC · JPL
146813	2001 YM_{93}	—	December 18, 2001	Kitt Peak	Spacewatch	EOS	3.7 km	MPC · JPL
146814	2001 YV_{95}	—	December 18, 2001	Palomar	NEAT	·	3.6 km	MPC · JPL
146815	2001 YP_{101}	—	December 17, 2001	Socorro	LINEAR	·	3.4 km	MPC · JPL
146816	2001 YL_{105}	—	December 17, 2001	Socorro	LINEAR	·	3.0 km	MPC · JPL
146817	2001 YR_{108}	—	December 18, 2001	Socorro	LINEAR	·	6.1 km	MPC · JPL
146818	2001 YL_{115}	—	December 17, 2001	Socorro	LINEAR	·	6.1 km	MPC · JPL
146819	2001 YO_{117}	—	December 18, 2001	Socorro	LINEAR	·	6.5 km	MPC · JPL
146820	2001 YQ_{125}	—	December 17, 2001	Socorro	LINEAR	EOS	3.5 km	MPC · JPL
146821	2001 YC_{129}	—	December 17, 2001	Socorro	LINEAR	EOS	3.2 km	MPC · JPL
146822	2001 YF_{130}	—	December 17, 2001	Socorro	LINEAR	URS	5.6 km	MPC · JPL
146823	2001 YD_{137}	—	December 22, 2001	Socorro	LINEAR	·	3.0 km	MPC · JPL
146824	2001 YP_{140}	—	December 22, 2001	Socorro	LINEAR	·	6.6 km	MPC · JPL
146825	2001 YC_{144}	—	December 17, 2001	Socorro	LINEAR	·	3.4 km	MPC · JPL
146826	2001 YK_{145}	—	December 17, 2001	Socorro	LINEAR	·	5.3 km	MPC · JPL
146827	2001 YW_{145}	—	December 18, 2001	Anderson Mesa	LONEOS	·	3.6 km	MPC · JPL
146828	2001 YL_{155}	—	December 20, 2001	Palomar	NEAT	·	5.6 km	MPC · JPL
146829	2002 AB_{5}	—	January 9, 2002	Cima Ekar	ADAS	·	6.7 km	MPC · JPL
146830	2002 AT_{8}	—	January 7, 2002	Kitt Peak	Spacewatch	KOR	1.8 km	MPC · JPL
146831	2002 AV_{11}	—	January 11, 2002	Socorro	LINEAR	H	1.3 km	MPC · JPL
146832	2002 AZ_{23}	—	January 7, 2002	Palomar	NEAT	BRA	2.5 km	MPC · JPL
146833	2002 AK_{25}	—	January 6, 2002	Haleakala	NEAT	H	1.1 km	MPC · JPL
146834	2002 AY_{31}	—	January 4, 2002	Bergisch Gladbach	W. Bickel	·	2.7 km	MPC · JPL
146835	2002 AF_{40}	—	January 9, 2002	Socorro	LINEAR	·	2.7 km	MPC · JPL
146836	2002 AR_{40}	—	January 9, 2002	Socorro	LINEAR	·	3.3 km	MPC · JPL
146837	2002 AN_{41}	—	January 9, 2002	Socorro	LINEAR	·	7.0 km	MPC · JPL
146838	2002 AR_{43}	—	January 9, 2002	Socorro	LINEAR	·	3.2 km	MPC · JPL
146839	2002 AK_{49}	—	January 9, 2002	Socorro	LINEAR	EOS	6.9 km	MPC · JPL
146840	2002 AN_{49}	—	January 9, 2002	Socorro	LINEAR	·	3.0 km	MPC · JPL
146841	2002 AP_{49}	—	January 9, 2002	Socorro	LINEAR	·	5.4 km	MPC · JPL
146842	2002 AA_{50}	—	January 9, 2002	Socorro	LINEAR	EOS	2.9 km	MPC · JPL
146843	2002 AP_{68}	—	January 12, 2002	Kitt Peak	Spacewatch	KOR	2.1 km	MPC · JPL
146844	2002 AP_{79}	—	January 8, 2002	Socorro	LINEAR	·	3.4 km	MPC · JPL
146845	2002 AG_{82}	—	January 9, 2002	Socorro	LINEAR	·	2.9 km	MPC · JPL
146846	2002 AM_{83}	—	January 9, 2002	Socorro	LINEAR	TEL	2.4 km	MPC · JPL
146847	2002 AV_{84}	—	January 9, 2002	Socorro	LINEAR	EOS	4.2 km	MPC · JPL
146848	2002 AC_{85}	—	January 9, 2002	Socorro	LINEAR	·	4.5 km	MPC · JPL
146849	2002 AX_{98}	—	January 8, 2002	Socorro	LINEAR	TEL	3.4 km	MPC · JPL
146850	2002 AT_{99}	—	January 8, 2002	Socorro	LINEAR	·	5.7 km	MPC · JPL
146851	2002 AK_{104}	—	January 9, 2002	Socorro	LINEAR	KOR	2.0 km	MPC · JPL
146852	2002 AQ_{109}	—	January 9, 2002	Socorro	LINEAR	·	4.7 km	MPC · JPL
146853	2002 AY_{110}	—	January 9, 2002	Socorro	LINEAR	·	4.4 km	MPC · JPL
146854	2002 AO_{115}	—	January 9, 2002	Socorro	LINEAR	·	5.4 km	MPC · JPL
146855	2002 AH_{121}	—	January 9, 2002	Socorro	LINEAR	·	4.3 km	MPC · JPL
146856	2002 AD_{124}	—	January 9, 2002	Socorro	LINEAR	·	5.0 km	MPC · JPL
146857	2002 AD_{127}	—	January 13, 2002	Socorro	LINEAR	·	3.4 km	MPC · JPL
146858	2002 AA_{148}	—	January 13, 2002	Palomar	NEAT	EOS	3.0 km	MPC · JPL
146859	2002 AB_{149}	—	January 13, 2002	Socorro	LINEAR	·	5.8 km	MPC · JPL
146860	2002 AL_{149}	—	January 14, 2002	Socorro	LINEAR	·	2.8 km	MPC · JPL
146861	2002 AS_{151}	—	January 14, 2002	Socorro	LINEAR	·	3.6 km	MPC · JPL
146862	2002 AV_{152}	—	January 14, 2002	Socorro	LINEAR	·	6.8 km	MPC · JPL
146863	2002 AW_{162}	—	January 13, 2002	Socorro	LINEAR	EOS	3.0 km	MPC · JPL
146864	2002 AX_{165}	—	January 13, 2002	Socorro	LINEAR	·	4.1 km	MPC · JPL
146865	2002 AB_{173}	—	January 14, 2002	Socorro	LINEAR	·	3.6 km	MPC · JPL
146866	2002 AO_{174}	—	January 14, 2002	Socorro	LINEAR	·	3.7 km	MPC · JPL
146867	2002 AC_{176}	—	January 14, 2002	Socorro	LINEAR	·	6.2 km	MPC · JPL
146868	2002 AG_{177}	—	January 14, 2002	Socorro	LINEAR	·	4.2 km	MPC · JPL
146869	2002 AN_{181}	—	January 5, 2002	Palomar	NEAT	·	4.2 km	MPC · JPL
146870	2002 AT_{181}	—	January 5, 2002	Palomar	NEAT	·	5.4 km	MPC · JPL
146871	2002 AT_{182}	—	January 5, 2002	Anderson Mesa	LONEOS	EOS	3.1 km	MPC · JPL
146872	2002 AE_{191}	—	January 11, 2002	Palomar	NEAT	TIR	5.0 km	MPC · JPL
146873	2002 AN_{208}	—	January 8, 2002	Socorro	LINEAR	VER	5.2 km	MPC · JPL
146874	2002 BB	—	January 17, 2002	Oaxaca	Roe, J. M.	·	4.7 km	MPC · JPL
146875	2002 BL_{17}	—	January 21, 2002	Socorro	LINEAR	·	3.8 km	MPC · JPL
146876	2002 BK_{21}	—	January 25, 2002	Socorro	LINEAR	H	1.0 km	MPC · JPL
146877	2002 BQ_{25}	—	January 25, 2002	Palomar	NEAT	·	5.3 km	MPC · JPL
146878	2002 CN_{1}	—	February 2, 2002	Pla D'Arguines	R. Ferrando	EOS	3.0 km	MPC · JPL
146879	2002 CS_{8}	—	February 5, 2002	Palomar	NEAT	HYG	4.2 km	MPC · JPL
146880	2002 CV_{8}	—	February 5, 2002	Palomar	NEAT	·	3.8 km	MPC · JPL
146881	2002 CH_{11}	—	February 1, 2002	Anderson Mesa	LONEOS	·	5.8 km	MPC · JPL
146882	2002 CV_{21}	—	February 5, 2002	Palomar	NEAT	·	3.7 km	MPC · JPL
146883	2002 CF_{24}	—	February 6, 2002	Haleakala	NEAT	NAE	5.0 km	MPC · JPL
146884	2002 CL_{24}	—	February 6, 2002	Haleakala	NEAT	·	8.1 km	MPC · JPL
146885	2002 CB_{27}	—	February 6, 2002	Socorro	LINEAR	·	4.9 km	MPC · JPL
146886	2002 CW_{27}	—	February 6, 2002	Socorro	LINEAR	·	3.1 km	MPC · JPL
146887	2002 CT_{29}	—	February 6, 2002	Socorro	LINEAR	VER	6.8 km	MPC · JPL
146888	2002 CG_{34}	—	February 6, 2002	Socorro	LINEAR	·	5.2 km	MPC · JPL
146889	2002 CG_{37}	—	February 7, 2002	Socorro	LINEAR	THM	3.3 km	MPC · JPL
146890	2002 CA_{38}	—	February 7, 2002	Socorro	LINEAR	HYG	5.0 km	MPC · JPL
146891	2002 CY_{40}	—	February 7, 2002	Palomar	NEAT	slow	5.6 km	MPC · JPL
146892	2002 CQ_{47}	—	February 3, 2002	Haleakala	NEAT	EOS	3.5 km	MPC · JPL
146893	2002 CK_{55}	—	February 7, 2002	Socorro	LINEAR	·	4.9 km	MPC · JPL
146894	2002 CX_{59}	—	February 14, 2002	Socorro	LINEAR	H	1.2 km	MPC · JPL
146895	2002 CP_{66}	—	February 7, 2002	Socorro	LINEAR	KOR	2.4 km	MPC · JPL
146896	2002 CZ_{69}	—	February 7, 2002	Socorro	LINEAR	·	2.9 km	MPC · JPL
146897	2002 CB_{74}	—	February 7, 2002	Socorro	LINEAR	(159)	4.2 km	MPC · JPL
146898	2002 CL_{74}	—	February 7, 2002	Socorro	LINEAR	·	3.9 km	MPC · JPL
146899	2002 CS_{75}	—	February 7, 2002	Socorro	LINEAR	·	2.5 km	MPC · JPL
146900	2002 CL_{79}	—	February 7, 2002	Socorro	LINEAR	VER	5.3 km	MPC · JPL

== 146901–147000 ==
back to top

Designation			Discovery			Properties		Ref
Permanent	Provisional	Named after	Date	Site	Discoverer(s)	Category	Diam.	Ref
146901	2002 CO_{82}	—	February 7, 2002	Socorro	LINEAR	THM	3.7 km	MPC · JPL
146902	2002 CL_{90}	—	February 7, 2002	Socorro	LINEAR	THM	3.8 km	MPC · JPL
146903	2002 CE_{92}	—	February 7, 2002	Socorro	LINEAR	·	6.9 km	MPC · JPL
146904	2002 CU_{94}	—	February 7, 2002	Socorro	LINEAR	·	5.0 km	MPC · JPL
146905	2002 CH_{97}	—	February 7, 2002	Socorro	LINEAR	·	3.9 km	MPC · JPL
146906	2002 CD_{119}	—	February 7, 2002	Socorro	LINEAR	THM	5.1 km	MPC · JPL
146907	2002 CH_{126}	—	February 7, 2002	Socorro	LINEAR	·	4.9 km	MPC · JPL
146908	2002 CX_{148}	—	February 10, 2002	Socorro	LINEAR	·	6.4 km	MPC · JPL
146909	2002 CL_{151}	—	February 10, 2002	Socorro	LINEAR	·	5.4 km	MPC · JPL
146910	2002 CR_{156}	—	February 7, 2002	Socorro	LINEAR	EOS	3.6 km	MPC · JPL
146911	2002 CA_{174}	—	February 8, 2002	Socorro	LINEAR	·	5.0 km	MPC · JPL
146912	2002 CL_{187}	—	February 10, 2002	Socorro	LINEAR	·	2.3 km	MPC · JPL
146913	2002 CE_{196}	—	February 10, 2002	Socorro	LINEAR	THM	3.1 km	MPC · JPL
146914	2002 CB_{199}	—	February 10, 2002	Socorro	LINEAR	·	4.4 km	MPC · JPL
146915	2002 CN_{204}	—	February 10, 2002	Socorro	LINEAR	·	4.8 km	MPC · JPL
146916	2002 CG_{210}	—	February 10, 2002	Socorro	LINEAR	THM	3.4 km	MPC · JPL
146917	2002 CE_{214}	—	February 10, 2002	Socorro	LINEAR	·	3.2 km	MPC · JPL
146918	2002 CT_{225}	—	February 7, 2002	Palomar	NEAT	URS · slow	6.7 km	MPC · JPL
146919	2002 CK_{226}	—	February 3, 2002	Haleakala	NEAT	·	3.9 km	MPC · JPL
146920	2002 CB_{227}	—	February 6, 2002	Palomar	NEAT	·	3.8 km	MPC · JPL
146921 Michaelbuckley	2002 CU_{250}	Michaelbuckley	February 6, 2002	Kitt Peak	M. W. Buie	·	3.3 km	MPC · JPL
146922	2002 CE_{255}	—	February 6, 2002	Palomar	NEAT	·	4.3 km	MPC · JPL
146923	2002 CJ_{260}	—	February 7, 2002	Palomar	NEAT	·	3.1 km	MPC · JPL
146924	2002 CU_{263}	—	February 7, 2002	Palomar	NEAT	KOR	2.3 km	MPC · JPL
146925	2002 CM_{265}	—	February 6, 2002	Anderson Mesa	LONEOS	EOS · fast	5.5 km	MPC · JPL
146926	2002 CN_{272}	—	February 8, 2002	Anderson Mesa	LONEOS	·	3.8 km	MPC · JPL
146927	2002 CX_{276}	—	February 7, 2002	Palomar	NEAT	·	3.9 km	MPC · JPL
146928	2002 CC_{289}	—	February 10, 2002	Socorro	LINEAR	·	4.5 km	MPC · JPL
146929	2002 CT_{297}	—	February 11, 2002	Socorro	LINEAR	·	3.0 km	MPC · JPL
146930	2002 CH_{300}	—	February 11, 2002	Socorro	LINEAR	·	3.7 km	MPC · JPL
146931	2002 CC_{307}	—	February 8, 2002	Socorro	LINEAR	·	5.4 km	MPC · JPL
146932	2002 CW_{307}	—	February 10, 2002	Socorro	LINEAR	·	3.8 km	MPC · JPL
146933	2002 CZ_{309}	—	February 6, 2002	Palomar	NEAT	·	4.2 km	MPC · JPL
146934	2002 CJ_{311}	—	February 10, 2002	Socorro	LINEAR	THM	2.9 km	MPC · JPL
146935	2002 DF_{5}	—	February 22, 2002	Socorro	LINEAR	·	7.7 km	MPC · JPL
146936	2002 DE_{6}	—	February 17, 2002	Palomar	NEAT	·	7.9 km	MPC · JPL
146937	2002 DO_{9}	—	February 19, 2002	Socorro	LINEAR	TIR	8.8 km	MPC · JPL
146938	2002 DV_{12}	—	February 24, 2002	Palomar	NEAT	·	3.0 km	MPC · JPL
146939	2002 DR_{17}	—	February 19, 2002	Desert Eagle	W. K. Y. Yeung	H	1.0 km	MPC · JPL
146940	2002 EY_{4}	—	March 10, 2002	Cima Ekar	ADAS	·	3.8 km	MPC · JPL
146941	2002 EC_{5}	—	March 10, 2002	Cima Ekar	ADAS	·	3.7 km	MPC · JPL
146942	2002 EQ_{7}	—	March 9, 2002	Socorro	LINEAR	H	870 m	MPC · JPL
146943	2002 EY_{15}	—	March 6, 2002	Palomar	NEAT	EOS ·	5.7 km	MPC · JPL
146944	2002 EA_{17}	—	March 5, 2002	Anderson Mesa	LONEOS	·	9.3 km	MPC · JPL
146945	2002 EC_{20}	—	March 5, 2002	Kitt Peak	Spacewatch	·	3.7 km	MPC · JPL
146946	2002 EC_{21}	—	March 10, 2002	Haleakala	NEAT	H	940 m	MPC · JPL
146947	2002 EG_{39}	—	March 9, 2002	Socorro	LINEAR	THM	3.5 km	MPC · JPL
146948	2002 EZ_{42}	—	March 12, 2002	Socorro	LINEAR	THM	4.5 km	MPC · JPL
146949	2002 EG_{51}	—	March 12, 2002	Kitt Peak	Spacewatch	·	4.3 km	MPC · JPL
146950	2002 EZ_{59}	—	March 13, 2002	Socorro	LINEAR	KOR	2.8 km	MPC · JPL
146951	2002 EP_{69}	—	March 13, 2002	Socorro	LINEAR	CYB	4.2 km	MPC · JPL
146952	2002 EQ_{72}	—	March 13, 2002	Socorro	LINEAR	·	4.0 km	MPC · JPL
146953	2002 ER_{80}	—	March 12, 2002	Palomar	NEAT	THM	3.6 km	MPC · JPL
146954	2002 EQ_{90}	—	March 12, 2002	Socorro	LINEAR	THM	5.6 km	MPC · JPL
146955	2002 EZ_{124}	—	March 12, 2002	Palomar	NEAT	·	4.4 km	MPC · JPL
146956	2002 EE_{161}	—	March 9, 2002	Palomar	NEAT	·	5.2 km	MPC · JPL
146957	2002 FG_{25}	—	March 19, 2002	Palomar	NEAT	·	7.5 km	MPC · JPL
146958	2002 FA_{39}	—	March 31, 2002	Palomar	NEAT	·	6.4 km	MPC · JPL
146959	2002 FA_{40}	—	March 18, 2002	Socorro	LINEAR	·	7.8 km	MPC · JPL
146960	2002 GO_{34}	—	April 2, 2002	Palomar	NEAT	·	4.1 km	MPC · JPL
146961	2002 GH_{129}	—	April 12, 2002	Socorro	LINEAR	3:2 · SHU	9.0 km	MPC · JPL
146962	2002 JN_{5}	—	May 5, 2002	Palomar	NEAT	CYB	9.6 km	MPC · JPL
146963	2002 JD_{12}	—	May 3, 2002	Desert Eagle	W. K. Y. Yeung	·	1.8 km	MPC · JPL
146964	2002 JM_{66}	—	May 10, 2002	Socorro	LINEAR	·	3.1 km	MPC · JPL
146965	2002 JS_{116}	—	May 4, 2002	Palomar	NEAT	H	1.2 km	MPC · JPL
146966	2002 KF_{1}	—	May 17, 2002	Socorro	LINEAR	H	1.1 km	MPC · JPL
146967	2002 LW_{7}	—	June 6, 2002	Socorro	LINEAR	·	1.4 km	MPC · JPL
146968	2002 LD_{24}	—	June 9, 2002	Desert Eagle	W. K. Y. Yeung	·	1.4 km	MPC · JPL
146969	2002 LZ_{25}	—	June 6, 2002	Socorro	LINEAR	·	2.4 km	MPC · JPL
146970	2002 LO_{55}	—	June 12, 2002	Socorro	LINEAR	·	1.3 km	MPC · JPL
146971	2002 NY_{10}	—	July 4, 2002	Palomar	NEAT	·	1.2 km	MPC · JPL
146972	2002 NU_{19}	—	July 9, 2002	Socorro	LINEAR	·	1.4 km	MPC · JPL
146973	2002 NJ_{22}	—	July 9, 2002	Socorro	LINEAR	V	1.1 km	MPC · JPL
146974	2002 NS_{22}	—	July 9, 2002	Socorro	LINEAR	(2076)	1.3 km	MPC · JPL
146975	2002 NF_{26}	—	July 9, 2002	Socorro	LINEAR	slow?	1.3 km	MPC · JPL
146976	2002 NC_{27}	—	July 9, 2002	Socorro	LINEAR	·	2.2 km	MPC · JPL
146977	2002 NS_{39}	—	July 15, 2002	Socorro	LINEAR	·	1.7 km	MPC · JPL
146978	2002 NG_{45}	—	July 12, 2002	Palomar	NEAT	·	1.2 km	MPC · JPL
146979	2002 NJ_{48}	—	July 14, 2002	Palomar	NEAT	PHO	4.3 km	MPC · JPL
146980	2002 NV_{49}	—	July 13, 2002	Haleakala	NEAT	·	1.4 km	MPC · JPL
146981	2002 NZ_{49}	—	July 13, 2002	Haleakala	NEAT	·	1.5 km	MPC · JPL
146982	2002 NX_{55}	—	July 12, 2002	Palomar	NEAT	NYS	1.4 km	MPC · JPL
146983	2002 NN_{61}	—	July 5, 2002	Palomar	NEAT	·	1.5 km	MPC · JPL
146984	2002 OF_{21}	—	July 22, 2002	Palomar	NEAT	·	1.1 km	MPC · JPL
146985 Yakelinromero	2002 PM_{11}	Yakelinromero	August 5, 2002	Campo Imperatore	CINEOS	·	1.6 km	MPC · JPL
146986	2002 PE_{18}	—	August 6, 2002	Palomar	NEAT	NYS	1.4 km	MPC · JPL
146987	2002 PC_{35}	—	August 6, 2002	Palomar	NEAT	·	1.5 km	MPC · JPL
146988	2002 PN_{41}	—	August 5, 2002	Socorro	LINEAR	ERI	2.6 km	MPC · JPL
146989	2002 PC_{42}	—	August 5, 2002	Socorro	LINEAR	ERI	3.3 km	MPC · JPL
146990	2002 PV_{43}	—	August 5, 2002	Socorro	LINEAR	·	1.4 km	MPC · JPL
146991	2002 PD_{44}	—	August 5, 2002	Socorro	LINEAR	·	2.1 km	MPC · JPL
146992	2002 PK_{48}	—	August 10, 2002	Socorro	LINEAR	·	1.5 km	MPC · JPL
146993	2002 PZ_{61}	—	August 8, 2002	Palomar	NEAT	·	1.0 km	MPC · JPL
146994	2002 PR_{63}	—	August 12, 2002	Reedy Creek	J. Broughton	·	1.6 km	MPC · JPL
146995	2002 PU_{81}	—	August 9, 2002	Socorro	LINEAR	·	1.1 km	MPC · JPL
146996	2002 PG_{85}	—	August 10, 2002	Socorro	LINEAR	·	1.6 km	MPC · JPL
146997	2002 PY_{91}	—	August 14, 2002	Socorro	LINEAR	·	1.3 km	MPC · JPL
146998	2002 PS_{93}	—	August 11, 2002	Haleakala	NEAT	NYS	1.6 km	MPC · JPL
146999	2002 PL_{99}	—	August 14, 2002	Socorro	LINEAR	(2076)	1.1 km	MPC · JPL
147000	2002 PD_{100}	—	August 14, 2002	Socorro	LINEAR	·	1.4 km	MPC · JPL

back to top

== See also ==
- Meanings of minor-planet names: 146001–147000
