= Meanings of minor-planet names: 147001–148000 =

As minor planet discoveries are confirmed, they are given a permanent number by the IAU's Minor Planet Center (MPC), and the discoverers can then submit names for them, following the IAU's naming conventions. The list below concerns those minor planets in the specified number-range that have received names, and explains the meanings of those names.

Official naming citations of newly named small Solar System bodies are approved and published in a bulletin by IAU's Working Group for Small Bodies Nomenclature (WGSBN). Before May 2021, citations were published in MPC's Minor Planet Circulars for many decades. Recent citations can also be found on the JPL Small-Body Database (SBDB). Until his death in 2016, German astronomer Lutz D. Schmadel compiled these citations into the Dictionary of Minor Planet Names (DMP) and regularly updated the collection.

Based on Paul Herget's The Names of the Minor Planets, Schmadel also researched the unclear origin of numerous asteroids, most of which had been named prior to World War II. This article incorporates text from this source, which is in the public domain: SBDB New namings may only be added to this list below after official publication as the preannouncement of names is condemned. The WGSBN publishes a comprehensive guideline for the naming rules of non-cometary small Solar System bodies.

== 147001–147100 ==
Named minor planet	Provisional	This minor planet was named for...	Ref · Catalog
There are no named minor planets in this number range

== 147101–147200 ==
back to top

Named minor planet	Provisional	This minor planet was named for...	Ref · Catalog
There are no named minor planets in this number range

== 147201–147300 ==
back to top

Named minor planet	Provisional	This minor planet was named for...	Ref · Catalog
There are no named minor planets in this number range

== 147301–147400 ==
back to top

Named minor planet	Provisional	This minor planet was named for...	Ref · Catalog
147397 Bobhazel	2003 FO_{7}	Robert Sealy (1927–2002) and Hazel Sealy (1930-2020), American founders of the Seaside Amateur Astronomers of Seaside, Oregon, and friends of the discoverer, James Whitney Young	JPL · 147397

== 147401–147500 ==
back to top

Named minor planet	Provisional	This minor planet was named for...	Ref · Catalog
147421 Gárdonyi	2003 GG	Géza Gárdonyi (1863–1922), Hungarian writer and journalist	JPL · 147421

== 147501–147600 ==
back to top

Named minor planet	Provisional	This minor planet was named for...	Ref · Catalog
147595 Gojkomitić	2004 GE_{20}	Gojko Mitić (born 1940), Serbian actor, director and stuntman. He starred as a Native American in several German Western movies and at the Karl May Festival in Bad Segeberg.	JPL · 147595

== 147601–147700 ==
back to top

Named minor planet	Provisional	This minor planet was named for...	Ref · Catalog
147693 Piccioni	2005 CQ_{77}	Giuseppe Piccioni (born 1965), Italian astronomer and expert on infrared imaging sensors	JPL · 147693

== 147701–147800 ==
back to top

Named minor planet	Provisional	This minor planet was named for...	Ref · Catalog
147703 Madras	2005 GU_{203}	Bertha Kalifon Madras, native of Canada and professor of psychobiology at Harvard Medical School.	IAU · 147703
147704 Gartenberg	2005 GN_{205}	Claudine Madras Gartenberg, American professor of management at the University of Pennsylvania.	IAU · 147704
147736 Raxavinic	2005 NC_{1}	Airline pilot trainee Rapha, experimental physicist Xavier and software engineer Vince, are the sons of the discoverer and his wife Nicole "Nicnac" Bosmans, a secretary at Brussels University	JPL · 147736
147745 Novemberkelly	2005 NK_{67}	November Kelly (born 1991), British comedian and podcast host, including Well There's Your Problem and Kill James Bond.	JPL · 147745
147766 Elisatoffoli	2005 QB_{39}	Elisa Toffoli (born 1977), an Italian singer-songwriter.	JPL · 147766

== 147801–147900 ==
back to top

Named minor planet	Provisional	This minor planet was named for...	Ref · Catalog
There are no named minor planets in this number range

== 147901–148000 ==
back to top

Named minor planet	Provisional	This minor planet was named for...	Ref · Catalog
147918 Chiayi	2006 UU_{214}	Chiayi County in southwestern Taiwan, location of the Lulin Observatory where this minor planet was discovered	JPL · 147918
147971 Nametoko	1994 WF	Nametoko Ravine is a narrow canyon in the Ashizuri-Uwakai National Park, Japan, located in the south of Ehime Prefecture	JPL · 147971

back to top

Preceded by 146,001–147,000	Meanings of minor-planet names List of minor planets: 147,001–148,000	Succeeded by 148,001–149,000
