= List of minor planets: 147001–148000 =

The following is a partial list of minor planets, running from minor-planet number 147001 through 148000, inclusive. The primary data for this and other partial lists is based on JPL's "Small-Body Orbital Elements" and data available from the Minor Planet Center. Critical list information is also provided by the MPC, unless otherwise specified from Lowell Observatory. A detailed description of the table's columns and additional sources are given on the main page including a complete list of every page in this series, and a statistical break-up on the dynamical classification of minor planets.

Also see the summary list of all named bodies in numerical and alphabetical order, and the corresponding naming citations for the number range of this particular list. New namings may only be added to this list after official publication, as the preannouncement of names is condemned by the Working Group for Small Bodies Nomenclature of the International Astronomical Union.

Near-Earth obj.	MBA (inner)	MBA (outer)	Centaur
Mars-crosser	MBA (middle)	Jupiter trojan	Trans-Neptunian obj.
Unclassified

== 147001–147100 ==
Designation			Discovery			Properties		Ref
Permanent	Provisional	Named after	Date	Site	Discoverer(s)	Category	Diam.	Ref
147001	2002 PC_{108}	—	August 13, 2002	Socorro	LINEAR	·	1.5 km	MPC · JPL
147002	2002 PT_{121}	—	August 13, 2002	Anderson Mesa	LONEOS	·	1.3 km	MPC · JPL
147003	2002 PV_{121}	—	August 13, 2002	Anderson Mesa	LONEOS	·	2.1 km	MPC · JPL
147004	2002 PT_{126}	—	August 14, 2002	Socorro	LINEAR	·	1.3 km	MPC · JPL
147005	2002 PA_{127}	—	August 14, 2002	Socorro	LINEAR	V	1.6 km	MPC · JPL
147006	2002 PC_{127}	—	August 14, 2002	Socorro	LINEAR	·	1.8 km	MPC · JPL
147007	2002 PD_{127}	—	August 14, 2002	Socorro	LINEAR	·	1.5 km	MPC · JPL
147008	2002 PU_{127}	—	August 14, 2002	Socorro	LINEAR	·	970 m	MPC · JPL
147009	2002 PS_{129}	—	August 15, 2002	Anderson Mesa	LONEOS	·	1.5 km	MPC · JPL
147010	2002 PY_{134}	—	August 14, 2002	Socorro	LINEAR	·	1.2 km	MPC · JPL
147011	2002 PP_{140}	—	August 15, 2002	Goodricke-Pigott	Goodricke-Pigott	·	1.2 km	MPC · JPL
147012	2002 PT_{153}	—	August 8, 2002	Anderson Mesa	LONEOS	·	1.1 km	MPC · JPL
147013	2002 PV_{169}	—	August 11, 2002	Haleakala	NEAT	·	1.6 km	MPC · JPL
147014	2002 QF	—	August 16, 2002	Socorro	LINEAR	·	2.3 km	MPC · JPL
147015	2002 QV_{16}	—	August 27, 2002	Palomar	NEAT	·	1.1 km	MPC · JPL
147016	2002 QY_{17}	—	August 28, 2002	Palomar	NEAT	·	1.9 km	MPC · JPL
147017	2002 QW_{28}	—	August 29, 2002	Palomar	NEAT	NYS	1.9 km	MPC · JPL
147018	2002 QG_{34}	—	August 29, 2002	Palomar	NEAT	MAS	910 m	MPC · JPL
147019	2002 QA_{47}	—	August 30, 2002	Socorro	LINEAR	·	1.4 km	MPC · JPL
147020	2002 QM_{90}	—	August 19, 2002	Palomar	NEAT	·	1.5 km	MPC · JPL
147021	2002 QS_{95}	—	August 18, 2002	Palomar	NEAT	·	980 m	MPC · JPL
147022	2002 QZ_{98}	—	August 19, 2002	Palomar	NEAT	(2076)	1.1 km	MPC · JPL
147023	2002 RL_{3}	—	September 4, 2002	Anderson Mesa	LONEOS	·	1.2 km	MPC · JPL
147024	2002 RW_{7}	—	September 3, 2002	Haleakala	NEAT	NYS	1.8 km	MPC · JPL
147025	2002 RK_{12}	—	September 4, 2002	Anderson Mesa	LONEOS	NYS	1.6 km	MPC · JPL
147026	2002 RF_{13}	—	September 4, 2002	Anderson Mesa	LONEOS	NYS ·	1.7 km	MPC · JPL
147027	2002 RV_{20}	—	September 4, 2002	Anderson Mesa	LONEOS	·	2.1 km	MPC · JPL
147028	2002 RO_{22}	—	September 4, 2002	Anderson Mesa	LONEOS	NYS	1.6 km	MPC · JPL
147029	2002 RU_{28}	—	September 6, 2002	Socorro	LINEAR	·	1.4 km	MPC · JPL
147030	2002 RE_{31}	—	September 4, 2002	Anderson Mesa	LONEOS	·	1.6 km	MPC · JPL
147031	2002 RX_{31}	—	September 4, 2002	Anderson Mesa	LONEOS	·	1.4 km	MPC · JPL
147032	2002 RE_{32}	—	September 4, 2002	Anderson Mesa	LONEOS	BAP	1.6 km	MPC · JPL
147033	2002 RX_{35}	—	September 5, 2002	Anderson Mesa	LONEOS	·	1.6 km	MPC · JPL
147034	2002 RA_{43}	—	September 5, 2002	Socorro	LINEAR	·	1.0 km	MPC · JPL
147035	2002 RU_{48}	—	September 5, 2002	Socorro	LINEAR	·	1.2 km	MPC · JPL
147036	2002 RJ_{49}	—	September 5, 2002	Socorro	LINEAR	·	1.0 km	MPC · JPL
147037	2002 RZ_{51}	—	September 5, 2002	Socorro	LINEAR	V	1.4 km	MPC · JPL
147038	2002 RW_{54}	—	September 5, 2002	Anderson Mesa	LONEOS	V	1.2 km	MPC · JPL
147039	2002 RX_{55}	—	September 5, 2002	Anderson Mesa	LONEOS	·	2.2 km	MPC · JPL
147040	2002 RJ_{64}	—	September 5, 2002	Socorro	LINEAR	·	1.1 km	MPC · JPL
147041	2002 RE_{65}	—	September 5, 2002	Socorro	LINEAR	·	1.6 km	MPC · JPL
147042	2002 RA_{71}	—	September 4, 2002	Palomar	NEAT	V	660 m	MPC · JPL
147043	2002 RA_{75}	—	September 5, 2002	Socorro	LINEAR	NYS	1.7 km	MPC · JPL
147044	2002 RW_{77}	—	September 5, 2002	Socorro	LINEAR	NYS	1.4 km	MPC · JPL
147045	2002 RE_{79}	—	September 5, 2002	Socorro	LINEAR	MAS	1.4 km	MPC · JPL
147046	2002 RB_{82}	—	September 5, 2002	Socorro	LINEAR	·	1.6 km	MPC · JPL
147047	2002 RE_{85}	—	September 5, 2002	Socorro	LINEAR	·	2.1 km	MPC · JPL
147048	2002 RW_{86}	—	September 5, 2002	Socorro	LINEAR	·	1.8 km	MPC · JPL
147049	2002 RP_{87}	—	September 5, 2002	Socorro	LINEAR	·	2.0 km	MPC · JPL
147050	2002 RJ_{88}	—	September 5, 2002	Socorro	LINEAR	·	2.3 km	MPC · JPL
147051	2002 RO_{91}	—	September 5, 2002	Socorro	LINEAR	·	1.8 km	MPC · JPL
147052	2002 RT_{94}	—	September 5, 2002	Socorro	LINEAR	NYS	2.6 km	MPC · JPL
147053	2002 RT_{100}	—	September 5, 2002	Socorro	LINEAR	·	1.4 km	MPC · JPL
147054	2002 RZ_{100}	—	September 5, 2002	Socorro	LINEAR	NYS	2.0 km	MPC · JPL
147055	2002 RU_{101}	—	September 5, 2002	Socorro	LINEAR	·	1.7 km	MPC · JPL
147056	2002 RW_{104}	—	September 5, 2002	Socorro	LINEAR	MAS	1.4 km	MPC · JPL
147057	2002 RY_{106}	—	September 5, 2002	Socorro	LINEAR	·	2.4 km	MPC · JPL
147058	2002 RP_{115}	—	September 6, 2002	Socorro	LINEAR	·	1.2 km	MPC · JPL
147059	2002 RD_{118}	—	September 8, 2002	Campo Imperatore	CINEOS	·	1.9 km	MPC · JPL
147060	2002 RG_{121}	—	September 7, 2002	Socorro	LINEAR	V	1.2 km	MPC · JPL
147061	2002 RJ_{121}	—	September 7, 2002	Socorro	LINEAR	·	1.7 km	MPC · JPL
147062	2002 RD_{126}	—	September 8, 2002	Haleakala	NEAT	·	1.6 km	MPC · JPL
147063	2002 RU_{133}	—	September 10, 2002	Palomar	NEAT	V	1.3 km	MPC · JPL
147064	2002 RA_{135}	—	September 10, 2002	Haleakala	NEAT	·	1.5 km	MPC · JPL
147065	2002 RS_{149}	—	September 11, 2002	Haleakala	NEAT	·	1.6 km	MPC · JPL
147066	2002 RD_{175}	—	September 13, 2002	Palomar	NEAT	(2076)	1.3 km	MPC · JPL
147067	2002 RD_{202}	—	September 13, 2002	Palomar	NEAT	·	1.1 km	MPC · JPL
147068	2002 RX_{212}	—	September 15, 2002	Haleakala	NEAT	V	1.3 km	MPC · JPL
147069	2002 RA_{215}	—	September 13, 2002	Socorro	LINEAR	·	1.6 km	MPC · JPL
147070	2002 RV_{224}	—	September 13, 2002	Palomar	NEAT	·	1.2 km	MPC · JPL
147071	2002 RA_{228}	—	September 14, 2002	Haleakala	NEAT	·	1.9 km	MPC · JPL
147072	2002 SF_{6}	—	September 27, 2002	Palomar	NEAT	NYS	1.2 km	MPC · JPL
147073	2002 SJ_{10}	—	September 27, 2002	Palomar	NEAT	NYS	1.4 km	MPC · JPL
147074	2002 SS_{12}	—	September 27, 2002	Palomar	NEAT	·	1.1 km	MPC · JPL
147075	2002 SJ_{19}	—	September 28, 2002	Palomar	NEAT	·	1.3 km	MPC · JPL
147076	2002 SP_{21}	—	September 26, 2002	Palomar	NEAT	·	940 m	MPC · JPL
147077	2002 SG_{25}	—	September 28, 2002	Haleakala	NEAT	V	1.2 km	MPC · JPL
147078	2002 SN_{27}	—	September 29, 2002	Haleakala	NEAT	V	1.2 km	MPC · JPL
147079	2002 SS_{30}	—	September 28, 2002	Haleakala	NEAT	·	1.6 km	MPC · JPL
147080	2002 SC_{32}	—	September 28, 2002	Haleakala	NEAT	·	1.8 km	MPC · JPL
147081	2002 SB_{36}	—	September 29, 2002	Haleakala	NEAT	MAS	1.3 km	MPC · JPL
147082	2002 ST_{36}	—	September 29, 2002	Haleakala	NEAT	V	1.5 km	MPC · JPL
147083	2002 SA_{37}	—	September 29, 2002	Haleakala	NEAT	·	1.2 km	MPC · JPL
147084	2002 SF_{37}	—	September 29, 2002	Haleakala	NEAT	·	1.4 km	MPC · JPL
147085	2002 ST_{42}	—	September 28, 2002	Haleakala	NEAT	NYS	2.3 km	MPC · JPL
147086	2002 SQ_{43}	—	September 28, 2002	Haleakala	NEAT	·	1.7 km	MPC · JPL
147087	2002 SL_{48}	—	September 30, 2002	Socorro	LINEAR	·	1.6 km	MPC · JPL
147088	2002 SQ_{50}	—	September 30, 2002	Haleakala	NEAT	NYS	3.5 km	MPC · JPL
147089	2002 SX_{52}	—	September 18, 2002	Palomar	NEAT	·	2.1 km	MPC · JPL
147090	2002 SZ_{53}	—	September 21, 2002	Haleakala	NEAT	·	2.3 km	MPC · JPL
147091	2002 SM_{56}	—	September 30, 2002	Socorro	LINEAR	·	2.2 km	MPC · JPL
147092	2002 TY	—	October 1, 2002	Anderson Mesa	LONEOS	·	1.7 km	MPC · JPL
147093	2002 TM_{1}	—	October 1, 2002	Anderson Mesa	LONEOS	·	2.6 km	MPC · JPL
147094	2002 TK_{13}	—	October 1, 2002	Anderson Mesa	LONEOS	·	1.4 km	MPC · JPL
147095	2002 TM_{15}	—	October 2, 2002	Socorro	LINEAR	NYS	1.6 km	MPC · JPL
147096	2002 TM_{16}	—	October 2, 2002	Socorro	LINEAR	NYS	1.9 km	MPC · JPL
147097	2002 TV_{18}	—	October 2, 2002	Socorro	LINEAR	·	1.6 km	MPC · JPL
147098	2002 TX_{25}	—	October 2, 2002	Socorro	LINEAR	·	2.1 km	MPC · JPL
147099	2002 TL_{28}	—	October 2, 2002	Socorro	LINEAR	·	1.8 km	MPC · JPL
147100	2002 TV_{29}	—	October 2, 2002	Socorro	LINEAR	NYS	1.8 km	MPC · JPL

== 147101–147200 ==
back to top

Designation			Discovery			Properties		Ref
Permanent	Provisional	Named after	Date	Site	Discoverer(s)	Category	Diam.	Ref
147101	2002 TC_{30}	—	October 2, 2002	Socorro	LINEAR	NYS	1.8 km	MPC · JPL
147102	2002 TD_{36}	—	October 2, 2002	Socorro	LINEAR	MAS	1.3 km	MPC · JPL
147103	2002 TO_{39}	—	October 2, 2002	Socorro	LINEAR	·	2.0 km	MPC · JPL
147104	2002 TG_{42}	—	October 2, 2002	Socorro	LINEAR	NYS	1.9 km	MPC · JPL
147105	2002 TM_{42}	—	October 2, 2002	Socorro	LINEAR	·	1.8 km	MPC · JPL
147106	2002 TE_{43}	—	October 2, 2002	Socorro	LINEAR	·	2.5 km	MPC · JPL
147107	2002 TL_{43}	—	October 2, 2002	Socorro	LINEAR	·	2.5 km	MPC · JPL
147108	2002 TZ_{43}	—	October 2, 2002	Socorro	LINEAR	·	2.0 km	MPC · JPL
147109	2002 TF_{48}	—	October 2, 2002	Socorro	LINEAR	·	3.2 km	MPC · JPL
147110	2002 TJ_{48}	—	October 2, 2002	Socorro	LINEAR	·	1.8 km	MPC · JPL
147111	2002 TZ_{48}	—	October 2, 2002	Socorro	LINEAR	·	1.3 km	MPC · JPL
147112	2002 TO_{50}	—	October 2, 2002	Socorro	LINEAR	·	2.3 km	MPC · JPL
147113	2002 TK_{70}	—	October 2, 2002	Campo Imperatore	CINEOS	·	2.4 km	MPC · JPL
147114	2002 TK_{72}	—	October 3, 2002	Palomar	NEAT	V	1.4 km	MPC · JPL
147115	2002 TU_{73}	—	October 3, 2002	Palomar	NEAT	·	1.8 km	MPC · JPL
147116	2002 TZ_{77}	—	October 1, 2002	Anderson Mesa	LONEOS	NYS	1.6 km	MPC · JPL
147117	2002 TD_{83}	—	October 2, 2002	Haleakala	NEAT	·	1.8 km	MPC · JPL
147118	2002 TO_{83}	—	October 2, 2002	Haleakala	NEAT	V	1.2 km	MPC · JPL
147119	2002 TR_{89}	—	October 3, 2002	Palomar	NEAT	·	1.2 km	MPC · JPL
147120	2002 TG_{97}	—	October 2, 2002	Socorro	LINEAR	·	1.2 km	MPC · JPL
147121	2002 TY_{120}	—	October 3, 2002	Palomar	NEAT	·	2.1 km	MPC · JPL
147122	2002 TZ_{122}	—	October 4, 2002	Palomar	NEAT	·	2.6 km	MPC · JPL
147123	2002 TR_{126}	—	October 4, 2002	Socorro	LINEAR	·	2.2 km	MPC · JPL
147124	2002 TH_{129}	—	October 4, 2002	Palomar	NEAT	·	1.3 km	MPC · JPL
147125	2002 TR_{130}	—	October 4, 2002	Socorro	LINEAR	·	1.5 km	MPC · JPL
147126	2002 TH_{131}	—	October 4, 2002	Socorro	LINEAR	·	1.4 km	MPC · JPL
147127	2002 TJ_{132}	—	October 4, 2002	Socorro	LINEAR	·	2.3 km	MPC · JPL
147128	2002 TT_{137}	—	October 4, 2002	Anderson Mesa	LONEOS	·	1.6 km	MPC · JPL
147129	2002 TE_{139}	—	October 4, 2002	Anderson Mesa	LONEOS	·	2.0 km	MPC · JPL
147130	2002 TZ_{172}	—	October 4, 2002	Socorro	LINEAR	·	1.4 km	MPC · JPL
147131	2002 TS_{180}	—	October 14, 2002	Socorro	LINEAR	·	3.6 km	MPC · JPL
147132	2002 TB_{186}	—	October 4, 2002	Socorro	LINEAR	·	1.6 km	MPC · JPL
147133	2002 TO_{203}	—	October 4, 2002	Socorro	LINEAR	·	1.1 km	MPC · JPL
147134	2002 TL_{206}	—	October 4, 2002	Socorro	LINEAR	·	2.0 km	MPC · JPL
147135	2002 TR_{210}	—	October 7, 2002	Socorro	LINEAR	·	1.5 km	MPC · JPL
147136	2002 TT_{224}	—	October 8, 2002	Anderson Mesa	LONEOS	·	1.9 km	MPC · JPL
147137	2002 TH_{239}	—	October 9, 2002	Socorro	LINEAR	PHO	2.0 km	MPC · JPL
147138	2002 TU_{239}	—	October 9, 2002	Socorro	LINEAR	NYS	3.5 km	MPC · JPL
147139	2002 TY_{243}	—	October 9, 2002	Socorro	LINEAR	·	2.7 km	MPC · JPL
147140	2002 TW_{245}	—	October 9, 2002	Anderson Mesa	LONEOS	V	1.2 km	MPC · JPL
147141	2002 TB_{246}	—	October 9, 2002	Anderson Mesa	LONEOS	V	1.1 km	MPC · JPL
147142	2002 TV_{246}	—	October 9, 2002	Kitt Peak	Spacewatch	·	1.4 km	MPC · JPL
147143	2002 TN_{253}	—	October 8, 2002	Anderson Mesa	LONEOS	·	2.3 km	MPC · JPL
147144	2002 TS_{255}	—	October 9, 2002	Socorro	LINEAR	·	1.6 km	MPC · JPL
147145	2002 TK_{259}	—	October 9, 2002	Socorro	LINEAR	(2076)	1.5 km	MPC · JPL
147146	2002 TU_{260}	—	October 9, 2002	Socorro	LINEAR	·	2.3 km	MPC · JPL
147147	2002 TP_{274}	—	October 9, 2002	Socorro	LINEAR	·	3.3 km	MPC · JPL
147148	2002 TQ_{275}	—	October 9, 2002	Socorro	LINEAR	·	1.8 km	MPC · JPL
147149	2002 TF_{279}	—	October 10, 2002	Socorro	LINEAR	·	2.3 km	MPC · JPL
147150	2002 TB_{286}	—	October 10, 2002	Socorro	LINEAR	·	1.8 km	MPC · JPL
147151	2002 TX_{293}	—	October 11, 2002	Socorro	LINEAR	·	1.4 km	MPC · JPL
147152	2002 TX_{297}	—	October 12, 2002	Socorro	LINEAR	·	2.2 km	MPC · JPL
147153	2002 TB_{303}	—	October 11, 2002	Socorro	LINEAR	NYS	1.6 km	MPC · JPL
147154	2002 UO_{5}	—	October 28, 2002	Palomar	NEAT	·	2.2 km	MPC · JPL
147155	2002 UM_{9}	—	October 28, 2002	Socorro	LINEAR	·	1.6 km	MPC · JPL
147156	2002 UL_{17}	—	October 28, 2002	Haleakala	NEAT	·	2.0 km	MPC · JPL
147157	2002 UO_{20}	—	October 28, 2002	Haleakala	NEAT	·	1.9 km	MPC · JPL
147158	2002 UY_{22}	—	October 30, 2002	Haleakala	NEAT	·	1.3 km	MPC · JPL
147159	2002 UQ_{31}	—	October 30, 2002	Haleakala	NEAT	·	1.1 km	MPC · JPL
147160	2002 UE_{32}	—	October 30, 2002	Haleakala	NEAT	·	3.1 km	MPC · JPL
147161	2002 VP_{3}	—	November 1, 2002	Palomar	NEAT	·	2.8 km	MPC · JPL
147162	2002 VK_{8}	—	November 1, 2002	Palomar	NEAT	·	2.0 km	MPC · JPL
147163	2002 VR_{8}	—	November 1, 2002	Palomar	NEAT	·	2.5 km	MPC · JPL
147164	2002 VM_{9}	—	November 1, 2002	Palomar	NEAT	V	1.4 km	MPC · JPL
147165	2002 VA_{12}	—	November 1, 2002	Haleakala	NEAT	·	1.4 km	MPC · JPL
147166	2002 VG_{12}	—	November 2, 2002	Palomar	NEAT	·	2.6 km	MPC · JPL
147167	2002 VZ_{13}	—	November 5, 2002	Socorro	LINEAR	·	1.5 km	MPC · JPL
147168	2002 VK_{19}	—	November 4, 2002	Palomar	NEAT	·	1.9 km	MPC · JPL
147169	2002 VY_{23}	—	November 5, 2002	Socorro	LINEAR	·	3.2 km	MPC · JPL
147170	2002 VJ_{27}	—	November 5, 2002	Socorro	LINEAR	·	1.6 km	MPC · JPL
147171	2002 VK_{28}	—	November 5, 2002	Anderson Mesa	LONEOS	·	2.2 km	MPC · JPL
147172	2002 VQ_{29}	—	November 5, 2002	Socorro	LINEAR	·	2.2 km	MPC · JPL
147173	2002 VP_{34}	—	November 5, 2002	Socorro	LINEAR	·	2.8 km	MPC · JPL
147174	2002 VU_{36}	—	November 5, 2002	Socorro	LINEAR	·	4.2 km	MPC · JPL
147175	2002 VV_{36}	—	November 5, 2002	Anderson Mesa	LONEOS	(5)	2.9 km	MPC · JPL
147176	2002 VP_{43}	—	November 4, 2002	Palomar	NEAT	ERI	3.3 km	MPC · JPL
147177	2002 VN_{45}	—	November 5, 2002	Socorro	LINEAR	·	2.1 km	MPC · JPL
147178	2002 VY_{48}	—	November 5, 2002	Anderson Mesa	LONEOS	NYS	1.9 km	MPC · JPL
147179	2002 VN_{49}	—	November 5, 2002	Anderson Mesa	LONEOS	·	2.4 km	MPC · JPL
147180	2002 VT_{52}	—	November 6, 2002	Socorro	LINEAR	·	1.8 km	MPC · JPL
147181	2002 VZ_{59}	—	November 3, 2002	Haleakala	NEAT	·	2.3 km	MPC · JPL
147182	2002 VF_{62}	—	November 5, 2002	Socorro	LINEAR	NYS	2.4 km	MPC · JPL
147183	2002 VB_{69}	—	November 8, 2002	Socorro	LINEAR	·	1.4 km	MPC · JPL
147184	2002 VG_{79}	—	November 7, 2002	Socorro	LINEAR	·	2.2 km	MPC · JPL
147185	2002 VX_{79}	—	November 7, 2002	Socorro	LINEAR	·	3.3 km	MPC · JPL
147186	2002 VG_{80}	—	November 7, 2002	Socorro	LINEAR	·	1.9 km	MPC · JPL
147187	2002 VR_{80}	—	November 7, 2002	Socorro	LINEAR	·	1.6 km	MPC · JPL
147188	2002 VF_{81}	—	November 7, 2002	Socorro	LINEAR	NYS	1.9 km	MPC · JPL
147189	2002 VN_{81}	—	November 7, 2002	Socorro	LINEAR	·	2.5 km	MPC · JPL
147190	2002 VY_{84}	—	November 8, 2002	Socorro	LINEAR	NYS	1.7 km	MPC · JPL
147191	2002 VL_{88}	—	November 11, 2002	Socorro	LINEAR	(5)	2.1 km	MPC · JPL
147192	2002 VD_{89}	—	November 11, 2002	Anderson Mesa	LONEOS	·	1.4 km	MPC · JPL
147193	2002 VE_{89}	—	November 11, 2002	Anderson Mesa	LONEOS	·	2.8 km	MPC · JPL
147194	2002 VU_{89}	—	November 8, 2002	Socorro	LINEAR	·	2.3 km	MPC · JPL
147195	2002 VM_{92}	—	November 11, 2002	Socorro	LINEAR	·	2.0 km	MPC · JPL
147196	2002 VX_{92}	—	November 11, 2002	Socorro	LINEAR	·	1.6 km	MPC · JPL
147197	2002 VF_{94}	—	November 12, 2002	Socorro	LINEAR	NYS	1.5 km	MPC · JPL
147198	2002 VS_{97}	—	November 12, 2002	Socorro	LINEAR	·	2.0 km	MPC · JPL
147199	2002 VU_{105}	—	November 12, 2002	Socorro	LINEAR	·	3.1 km	MPC · JPL
147200	2002 VS_{110}	—	November 12, 2002	Socorro	LINEAR	·	4.0 km	MPC · JPL

== 147201–147300 ==
back to top

Designation			Discovery			Properties		Ref
Permanent	Provisional	Named after	Date	Site	Discoverer(s)	Category	Diam.	Ref
147201	2002 VL_{113}	—	November 13, 2002	Palomar	NEAT	NYS	2.0 km	MPC · JPL
147202	2002 VB_{119}	—	November 12, 2002	Socorro	LINEAR	V	1.2 km	MPC · JPL
147203	2002 VM_{121}	—	November 12, 2002	Palomar	NEAT	·	1.4 km	MPC · JPL
147204	2002 VV_{124}	—	November 12, 2002	Socorro	LINEAR	·	2.2 km	MPC · JPL
147205	2002 VY_{133}	—	November 6, 2002	Anderson Mesa	LONEOS	·	3.0 km	MPC · JPL
147206	2002 VJ_{139}	—	November 6, 2002	Socorro	LINEAR	·	3.1 km	MPC · JPL
147207	2002 VK_{139}	—	November 6, 2002	Palomar	NEAT	·	1.6 km	MPC · JPL
147208	2002 WE	—	November 18, 2002	Palomar	NEAT	·	3.7 km	MPC · JPL
147209	2002 WN_{5}	—	November 24, 2002	Palomar	NEAT	·	2.0 km	MPC · JPL
147210	2002 WC_{6}	—	November 24, 2002	Palomar	NEAT	·	1.9 km	MPC · JPL
147211	2002 WW_{7}	—	November 24, 2002	Palomar	NEAT	·	1.3 km	MPC · JPL
147212	2002 WW_{8}	—	November 25, 2002	Palomar	NEAT	MAS	1.1 km	MPC · JPL
147213	2002 WX_{13}	—	November 28, 2002	Anderson Mesa	LONEOS	V	1.2 km	MPC · JPL
147214	2002 WL_{14}	—	November 28, 2002	Anderson Mesa	LONEOS	·	1.5 km	MPC · JPL
147215	2002 WQ_{18}	—	November 30, 2002	Haleakala	NEAT	PHO	2.3 km	MPC · JPL
147216	2002 XC_{6}	—	December 1, 2002	Socorro	LINEAR	·	2.6 km	MPC · JPL
147217	2002 XT_{7}	—	December 2, 2002	Socorro	LINEAR	EUN	1.8 km	MPC · JPL
147218	2002 XA_{11}	—	December 3, 2002	Palomar	NEAT	NYS	1.2 km	MPC · JPL
147219	2002 XQ_{12}	—	December 3, 2002	Palomar	NEAT	·	1.8 km	MPC · JPL
147220	2002 XZ_{14}	—	December 7, 2002	Desert Eagle	W. K. Y. Yeung	·	1.7 km	MPC · JPL
147221	2002 XT_{24}	—	December 5, 2002	Socorro	LINEAR	·	2.0 km	MPC · JPL
147222	2002 XS_{28}	—	December 5, 2002	Socorro	LINEAR	·	2.4 km	MPC · JPL
147223	2002 XB_{29}	—	December 5, 2002	Socorro	LINEAR	·	2.5 km	MPC · JPL
147224	2002 XB_{31}	—	December 6, 2002	Socorro	LINEAR	·	2.5 km	MPC · JPL
147225	2002 XQ_{31}	—	December 6, 2002	Socorro	LINEAR	·	2.7 km	MPC · JPL
147226	2002 XB_{32}	—	December 6, 2002	Socorro	LINEAR	·	2.1 km	MPC · JPL
147227	2002 XM_{34}	—	December 5, 2002	Socorro	LINEAR	·	2.6 km	MPC · JPL
147228	2002 XL_{35}	—	December 8, 2002	Desert Eagle	W. K. Y. Yeung	NYS	1.9 km	MPC · JPL
147229	2002 XF_{43}	—	December 9, 2002	Kitt Peak	Spacewatch	·	2.5 km	MPC · JPL
147230	2002 XU_{43}	—	December 6, 2002	Socorro	LINEAR	V	1.5 km	MPC · JPL
147231	2002 XV_{47}	—	December 10, 2002	Socorro	LINEAR	V	1.3 km	MPC · JPL
147232	2002 XB_{48}	—	December 10, 2002	Socorro	LINEAR	·	1.8 km	MPC · JPL
147233	2002 XC_{48}	—	December 10, 2002	Socorro	LINEAR	·	2.1 km	MPC · JPL
147234	2002 XV_{50}	—	December 10, 2002	Palomar	NEAT	MAR	2.0 km	MPC · JPL
147235	2002 XD_{52}	—	December 10, 2002	Socorro	LINEAR	·	2.0 km	MPC · JPL
147236	2002 XM_{52}	—	December 10, 2002	Socorro	LINEAR	(5)	2.0 km	MPC · JPL
147237	2002 XC_{54}	—	December 10, 2002	Socorro	LINEAR	·	2.9 km	MPC · JPL
147238	2002 XX_{54}	—	December 10, 2002	Palomar	NEAT	·	2.7 km	MPC · JPL
147239	2002 XF_{59}	—	December 11, 2002	Socorro	LINEAR	·	4.0 km	MPC · JPL
147240	2002 XW_{60}	—	December 10, 2002	Socorro	LINEAR	NYS	1.7 km	MPC · JPL
147241	2002 XW_{62}	—	December 11, 2002	Socorro	LINEAR	SUL · slow	4.0 km	MPC · JPL
147242	2002 XJ_{63}	—	December 11, 2002	Socorro	LINEAR	·	2.1 km	MPC · JPL
147243	2002 XV_{70}	—	December 10, 2002	Socorro	LINEAR	·	2.2 km	MPC · JPL
147244	2002 XE_{72}	—	December 11, 2002	Socorro	LINEAR	·	2.3 km	MPC · JPL
147245	2002 XV_{77}	—	December 11, 2002	Socorro	LINEAR	·	2.3 km	MPC · JPL
147246	2002 XW_{77}	—	December 11, 2002	Socorro	LINEAR	·	2.5 km	MPC · JPL
147247	2002 XA_{80}	—	December 11, 2002	Socorro	LINEAR	(5)	2.8 km	MPC · JPL
147248	2002 XC_{80}	—	December 11, 2002	Socorro	LINEAR	·	4.5 km	MPC · JPL
147249	2002 XZ_{81}	—	December 11, 2002	Socorro	LINEAR	PHO	3.7 km	MPC · JPL
147250	2002 XL_{82}	—	December 11, 2002	Palomar	NEAT	·	3.1 km	MPC · JPL
147251	2002 XJ_{85}	—	December 11, 2002	Socorro	LINEAR	·	2.6 km	MPC · JPL
147252	2002 XA_{86}	—	December 11, 2002	Socorro	LINEAR	MAR	1.7 km	MPC · JPL
147253	2002 XG_{86}	—	December 11, 2002	Socorro	LINEAR	RAF	1.7 km	MPC · JPL
147254	2002 XK_{87}	—	December 11, 2002	Socorro	LINEAR	ADE	3.7 km	MPC · JPL
147255	2002 XX_{88}	—	December 14, 2002	Socorro	LINEAR	(5)	3.7 km	MPC · JPL
147256	2002 XN_{91}	—	December 4, 2002	Kitt Peak	M. W. Buie	·	2.2 km	MPC · JPL
147257	2002 XO_{91}	—	December 4, 2002	Kitt Peak	M. W. Buie	·	2.3 km	MPC · JPL
147258	2002 XG_{102}	—	December 5, 2002	Socorro	LINEAR	·	2.5 km	MPC · JPL
147259	2002 XP_{110}	—	December 6, 2002	Socorro	LINEAR	·	1.7 km	MPC · JPL
147260	2002 XH_{113}	—	December 6, 2002	Socorro	LINEAR	·	2.3 km	MPC · JPL
147261	2002 YQ	—	December 27, 2002	Anderson Mesa	LONEOS	·	2.1 km	MPC · JPL
147262	2002 YV	—	December 27, 2002	Anderson Mesa	LONEOS	·	2.0 km	MPC · JPL
147263	2002 YF_{7}	—	December 28, 2002	Kitt Peak	Spacewatch	ADE	5.0 km	MPC · JPL
147264	2002 YO_{7}	—	December 31, 2002	Socorro	LINEAR	·	2.7 km	MPC · JPL
147265	2002 YP_{8}	—	December 31, 2002	Socorro	LINEAR	·	2.3 km	MPC · JPL
147266	2002 YW_{8}	—	December 31, 2002	Socorro	LINEAR	·	2.1 km	MPC · JPL
147267	2002 YE_{11}	—	December 31, 2002	Socorro	LINEAR	EUN	2.5 km	MPC · JPL
147268	2002 YH_{15}	—	December 31, 2002	Socorro	LINEAR	·	1.6 km	MPC · JPL
147269	2002 YP_{16}	—	December 31, 2002	Socorro	LINEAR	·	2.4 km	MPC · JPL
147270	2002 YT_{16}	—	December 31, 2002	Socorro	LINEAR	·	1.5 km	MPC · JPL
147271	2002 YG_{24}	—	December 31, 2002	Socorro	LINEAR	·	2.0 km	MPC · JPL
147272	2002 YV_{25}	—	December 31, 2002	Socorro	LINEAR	·	3.4 km	MPC · JPL
147273	2002 YB_{26}	—	December 31, 2002	Socorro	LINEAR	EUN	2.2 km	MPC · JPL
147274	2002 YB_{27}	—	December 31, 2002	Socorro	LINEAR	·	3.0 km	MPC · JPL
147275	2002 YH_{29}	—	December 31, 2002	Socorro	LINEAR	·	3.4 km	MPC · JPL
147276	2002 YZ_{29}	—	December 31, 2002	Socorro	LINEAR	·	1.9 km	MPC · JPL
147277	2002 YC_{31}	—	December 31, 2002	Socorro	LINEAR	PHO	1.9 km	MPC · JPL
147278	2002 YU_{31}	—	December 31, 2002	Socorro	LINEAR	·	3.4 km	MPC · JPL
147279	2002 YH_{32}	—	December 30, 2002	Haleakala	NEAT	·	4.6 km	MPC · JPL
147280	2002 YJ_{33}	—	December 30, 2002	Socorro	LINEAR	·	3.3 km	MPC · JPL
147281	2002 YG_{35}	—	December 31, 2002	Socorro	LINEAR	·	3.2 km	MPC · JPL
147282	2003 AE_{10}	—	January 1, 2003	Socorro	LINEAR	(5)	2.3 km	MPC · JPL
147283	2003 AD_{14}	—	January 1, 2003	Socorro	LINEAR	·	3.5 km	MPC · JPL
147284	2003 AR_{22}	—	January 7, 2003	Socorro	LINEAR	·	6.0 km	MPC · JPL
147285	2003 AF_{24}	—	January 4, 2003	Socorro	LINEAR	·	1.6 km	MPC · JPL
147286	2003 AF_{28}	—	January 4, 2003	Socorro	LINEAR	(5)	2.2 km	MPC · JPL
147287	2003 AA_{29}	—	January 4, 2003	Socorro	LINEAR	·	2.0 km	MPC · JPL
147288	2003 AJ_{32}	—	January 5, 2003	Socorro	LINEAR	·	2.2 km	MPC · JPL
147289	2003 AM_{35}	—	January 7, 2003	Socorro	LINEAR	·	2.8 km	MPC · JPL
147290	2003 AZ_{35}	—	January 7, 2003	Socorro	LINEAR	·	2.3 km	MPC · JPL
147291	2003 AD_{38}	—	January 7, 2003	Socorro	LINEAR	·	2.1 km	MPC · JPL
147292	2003 AY_{39}	—	January 7, 2003	Socorro	LINEAR	GEF	1.9 km	MPC · JPL
147293	2003 AR_{42}	—	January 7, 2003	Haleakala	NEAT	BRA	4.0 km	MPC · JPL
147294	2003 AD_{43}	—	January 5, 2003	Socorro	LINEAR	·	2.0 km	MPC · JPL
147295	2003 AE_{48}	—	January 5, 2003	Socorro	LINEAR	·	3.1 km	MPC · JPL
147296	2003 AS_{54}	—	January 5, 2003	Socorro	LINEAR	·	2.0 km	MPC · JPL
147297	2003 AO_{57}	—	January 5, 2003	Socorro	LINEAR	·	2.7 km	MPC · JPL
147298	2003 AR_{57}	—	January 5, 2003	Socorro	LINEAR	NYS	2.7 km	MPC · JPL
147299	2003 AU_{58}	—	January 5, 2003	Socorro	LINEAR	·	3.2 km	MPC · JPL
147300	2003 AQ_{59}	—	January 5, 2003	Socorro	LINEAR	·	3.7 km	MPC · JPL

== 147301–147400 ==
back to top

Designation			Discovery			Properties		Ref
Permanent	Provisional	Named after	Date	Site	Discoverer(s)	Category	Diam.	Ref
147301	2003 AF_{61}	—	January 7, 2003	Socorro	LINEAR	·	2.5 km	MPC · JPL
147302	2003 AS_{62}	—	January 8, 2003	Socorro	LINEAR	NYS	2.4 km	MPC · JPL
147303	2003 AG_{65}	—	January 7, 2003	Socorro	LINEAR	·	3.1 km	MPC · JPL
147304	2003 AN_{68}	—	January 8, 2003	Socorro	LINEAR	·	2.1 km	MPC · JPL
147305	2003 AD_{73}	—	January 11, 2003	Socorro	LINEAR	·	2.4 km	MPC · JPL
147306	2003 AH_{73}	—	January 11, 2003	Socorro	LINEAR	·	2.9 km	MPC · JPL
147307	2003 AH_{78}	—	January 10, 2003	Socorro	LINEAR	EUN	3.0 km	MPC · JPL
147308	2003 AN_{78}	—	January 10, 2003	Kitt Peak	Spacewatch	·	3.3 km	MPC · JPL
147309	2003 AS_{88}	—	January 2, 2003	Socorro	LINEAR	·	3.6 km	MPC · JPL
147310	2003 AT_{88}	—	January 2, 2003	Socorro	LINEAR	JUN	2.6 km	MPC · JPL
147311	2003 AF_{89}	—	January 4, 2003	Socorro	LINEAR	(1547)	2.5 km	MPC · JPL
147312	2003 AT_{89}	—	January 4, 2003	Socorro	LINEAR	·	3.7 km	MPC · JPL
147313	2003 AZ_{93}	—	January 2, 2003	Socorro	LINEAR	·	4.9 km	MPC · JPL
147314	2003 AC_{94}	—	January 1, 2003	Kitt Peak	Spacewatch	·	4.7 km	MPC · JPL
147315	2003 BK_{2}	—	January 25, 2003	Palomar	NEAT	GEF	2.0 km	MPC · JPL
147316	2003 BJ_{6}	—	January 23, 2003	Kvistaberg	Uppsala-DLR Asteroid Survey	·	2.5 km	MPC · JPL
147317	2003 BF_{7}	—	January 25, 2003	Anderson Mesa	LONEOS	·	3.5 km	MPC · JPL
147318	2003 BD_{8}	—	January 26, 2003	Anderson Mesa	LONEOS	·	1.7 km	MPC · JPL
147319	2003 BG_{8}	—	January 26, 2003	Anderson Mesa	LONEOS	·	1.8 km	MPC · JPL
147320	2003 BZ_{12}	—	January 26, 2003	Anderson Mesa	LONEOS	·	1.7 km	MPC · JPL
147321	2003 BU_{13}	—	January 26, 2003	Haleakala	NEAT	·	1.7 km	MPC · JPL
147322	2003 BC_{15}	—	January 26, 2003	Haleakala	NEAT	·	2.2 km	MPC · JPL
147323	2003 BG_{15}	—	January 26, 2003	Haleakala	NEAT	·	2.5 km	MPC · JPL
147324	2003 BD_{16}	—	January 26, 2003	Haleakala	NEAT	·	4.1 km	MPC · JPL
147325	2003 BW_{17}	—	January 27, 2003	Socorro	LINEAR	·	1.9 km	MPC · JPL
147326	2003 BF_{25}	—	January 25, 2003	Palomar	NEAT	GEF	2.1 km	MPC · JPL
147327	2003 BH_{30}	—	January 27, 2003	Socorro	LINEAR	EUN	2.1 km	MPC · JPL
147328	2003 BG_{31}	—	January 27, 2003	Socorro	LINEAR	·	2.9 km	MPC · JPL
147329	2003 BJ_{33}	—	January 27, 2003	Haleakala	NEAT	EUN	2.0 km	MPC · JPL
147330	2003 BR_{33}	—	January 27, 2003	Haleakala	NEAT	ADE	3.5 km	MPC · JPL
147331	2003 BR_{38}	—	January 27, 2003	Socorro	LINEAR	·	3.5 km	MPC · JPL
147332	2003 BB_{40}	—	January 27, 2003	Kitt Peak	Spacewatch	·	2.3 km	MPC · JPL
147333	2003 BP_{42}	—	January 28, 2003	Socorro	LINEAR	·	3.8 km	MPC · JPL
147334	2003 BE_{49}	—	January 26, 2003	Haleakala	NEAT	·	2.5 km	MPC · JPL
147335	2003 BK_{49}	—	January 27, 2003	Anderson Mesa	LONEOS	·	1.9 km	MPC · JPL
147336	2003 BY_{50}	—	January 27, 2003	Socorro	LINEAR	NYS	2.4 km	MPC · JPL
147337	2003 BU_{51}	—	January 27, 2003	Socorro	LINEAR	(5)	2.0 km	MPC · JPL
147338	2003 BT_{54}	—	January 27, 2003	Palomar	NEAT	·	2.7 km	MPC · JPL
147339	2003 BW_{56}	—	January 27, 2003	Socorro	LINEAR	·	2.3 km	MPC · JPL
147340	2003 BC_{57}	—	January 27, 2003	Socorro	LINEAR	·	2.4 km	MPC · JPL
147341	2003 BE_{60}	—	January 27, 2003	Socorro	LINEAR	·	3.3 km	MPC · JPL
147342	2003 BT_{64}	—	January 30, 2003	Kitt Peak	Spacewatch	·	2.7 km	MPC · JPL
147343	2003 BY_{65}	—	January 30, 2003	Kitt Peak	Spacewatch	MAS	1.4 km	MPC · JPL
147344	2003 BK_{67}	—	January 30, 2003	Haleakala	NEAT	·	2.7 km	MPC · JPL
147345	2003 BG_{69}	—	January 29, 2003	Kitt Peak	Spacewatch	·	4.8 km	MPC · JPL
147346	2003 BJ_{71}	—	January 31, 2003	Socorro	LINEAR	·	4.2 km	MPC · JPL
147347	2003 BL_{71}	—	January 31, 2003	Socorro	LINEAR	·	2.2 km	MPC · JPL
147348	2003 BF_{72}	—	January 28, 2003	Socorro	LINEAR	ADE	3.6 km	MPC · JPL
147349	2003 BC_{73}	—	January 28, 2003	Palomar	NEAT	(5)	2.0 km	MPC · JPL
147350	2003 BD_{78}	—	January 30, 2003	Haleakala	NEAT	·	2.9 km	MPC · JPL
147351	2003 BB_{81}	—	January 31, 2003	Socorro	LINEAR	·	2.7 km	MPC · JPL
147352	2003 BG_{81}	—	January 31, 2003	Socorro	LINEAR	·	1.5 km	MPC · JPL
147353	2003 BH_{81}	—	January 31, 2003	Socorro	LINEAR	·	4.9 km	MPC · JPL
147354	2003 BY_{82}	—	January 31, 2003	Socorro	LINEAR	·	2.5 km	MPC · JPL
147355	2003 BV_{83}	—	January 31, 2003	Socorro	LINEAR	NEM	4.1 km	MPC · JPL
147356	2003 BN_{87}	—	January 26, 2003	Socorro	LINEAR	·	4.2 km	MPC · JPL
147357	2003 CF_{2}	—	February 1, 2003	Socorro	LINEAR	·	1.8 km	MPC · JPL
147358	2003 CZ_{2}	—	February 2, 2003	Socorro	LINEAR	·	3.2 km	MPC · JPL
147359	2003 CJ_{8}	—	February 1, 2003	Socorro	LINEAR	·	4.6 km	MPC · JPL
147360	2003 CY_{8}	—	February 2, 2003	Anderson Mesa	LONEOS	·	3.6 km	MPC · JPL
147361	2003 CP_{9}	—	February 2, 2003	Socorro	LINEAR	MRX	2.2 km	MPC · JPL
147362	2003 CR_{9}	—	February 2, 2003	Socorro	LINEAR	MRX	1.7 km	MPC · JPL
147363	2003 CH_{10}	—	February 2, 2003	Socorro	LINEAR	DOR	5.8 km	MPC · JPL
147364	2003 CD_{11}	—	February 2, 2003	Socorro	LINEAR	·	2.2 km	MPC · JPL
147365	2003 CH_{13}	—	February 3, 2003	Haleakala	NEAT	(5)	2.2 km	MPC · JPL
147366	2003 CZ_{18}	—	February 8, 2003	Anderson Mesa	LONEOS	EUN	2.3 km	MPC · JPL
147367	2003 CA_{20}	—	February 9, 2003	Consell	Á. López J., R. Pacheco	·	3.3 km	MPC · JPL
147368	2003 CP_{21}	—	February 1, 2003	Kitt Peak	Spacewatch	KOR	1.9 km	MPC · JPL
147369	2003 DA_{1}	—	February 21, 2003	Palomar	NEAT	·	1.9 km	MPC · JPL
147370	2003 DO_{16}	—	February 21, 2003	Palomar	NEAT	GEF	1.6 km	MPC · JPL
147371	2003 DU_{16}	—	February 21, 2003	Palomar	NEAT	·	3.3 km	MPC · JPL
147372	2003 DB_{20}	—	February 22, 2003	Palomar	NEAT	·	1.7 km	MPC · JPL
147373	2003 EB	—	March 1, 2003	Jornada	Dixon, D. S.	GEF	1.6 km	MPC · JPL
147374	2003 EE_{3}	—	March 6, 2003	Socorro	LINEAR	HOF	5.2 km	MPC · JPL
147375	2003 EH_{5}	—	March 4, 2003	Cima Ekar	ADAS	MIS	4.2 km	MPC · JPL
147376	2003 EM_{21}	—	March 6, 2003	Anderson Mesa	LONEOS	·	3.3 km	MPC · JPL
147377	2003 ET_{21}	—	March 6, 2003	Socorro	LINEAR	·	2.5 km	MPC · JPL
147378	2003 EP_{22}	—	March 6, 2003	Socorro	LINEAR	·	2.7 km	MPC · JPL
147379	2003 EA_{23}	—	March 6, 2003	Socorro	LINEAR	(13314)	3.9 km	MPC · JPL
147380	2003 EC_{26}	—	March 6, 2003	Anderson Mesa	LONEOS	·	2.8 km	MPC · JPL
147381	2003 EE_{29}	—	March 6, 2003	Socorro	LINEAR	·	2.9 km	MPC · JPL
147382	2003 EC_{33}	—	March 7, 2003	Anderson Mesa	LONEOS	·	2.6 km	MPC · JPL
147383	2003 EJ_{36}	—	March 7, 2003	Anderson Mesa	LONEOS	·	2.7 km	MPC · JPL
147384	2003 EW_{36}	—	March 8, 2003	Anderson Mesa	LONEOS	·	3.3 km	MPC · JPL
147385	2003 ER_{39}	—	March 8, 2003	Socorro	LINEAR	·	3.9 km	MPC · JPL
147386	2003 ED_{53}	—	March 8, 2003	Anderson Mesa	LONEOS	EUN	2.5 km	MPC · JPL
147387	2003 EJ_{53}	—	March 8, 2003	Palomar	NEAT	MAR	2.0 km	MPC · JPL
147388	2003 EO_{57}	—	March 9, 2003	Palomar	NEAT	·	2.9 km	MPC · JPL
147389	2003 EV_{57}	—	March 9, 2003	Palomar	NEAT	TIR	4.2 km	MPC · JPL
147390	2003 EK_{58}	—	March 12, 2003	Socorro	LINEAR	·	6.4 km	MPC · JPL
147391	2003 EO_{59}	—	March 11, 2003	Socorro	LINEAR	·	3.0 km	MPC · JPL
147392	2003 ET_{61}	—	March 8, 2003	Anderson Mesa	LONEOS	·	3.3 km	MPC · JPL
147393	2003 EV_{61}	—	March 9, 2003	Socorro	LINEAR	·	4.0 km	MPC · JPL
147394	2003 EB_{62}	—	March 9, 2003	Socorro	LINEAR	EOS	2.9 km	MPC · JPL
147395	2003 EE_{62}	—	March 9, 2003	Socorro	LINEAR	·	6.4 km	MPC · JPL
147396	2003 EQ_{62}	—	March 12, 2003	Socorro	LINEAR	·	3.5 km	MPC · JPL
147397 Bobhazel	2003 FO_{7}	Bobhazel	March 30, 2003	Wrightwood	J. W. Young	·	2.8 km	MPC · JPL
147398	2003 FX_{8}	—	March 31, 2003	Palomar	NEAT	·	7.3 km	MPC · JPL
147399	2003 FV_{11}	—	March 23, 2003	Kitt Peak	Spacewatch	KOR	2.3 km	MPC · JPL
147400	2003 FF_{17}	—	March 24, 2003	Kitt Peak	Spacewatch	·	3.3 km	MPC · JPL

== 147401–147500 ==
back to top

Designation			Discovery			Properties		Ref
Permanent	Provisional	Named after	Date	Site	Discoverer(s)	Category	Diam.	Ref
147401	2003 FJ_{21}	—	March 24, 2003	Kitt Peak	Spacewatch	GEF	2.6 km	MPC · JPL
147402	2003 FB_{34}	—	March 23, 2003	Kitt Peak	Spacewatch	·	2.6 km	MPC · JPL
147403	2003 FW_{41}	—	March 25, 2003	Haleakala	NEAT	·	3.4 km	MPC · JPL
147404	2003 FS_{43}	—	March 23, 2003	Kitt Peak	Spacewatch	·	4.0 km	MPC · JPL
147405	2003 FG_{46}	—	March 24, 2003	Kitt Peak	Spacewatch	·	1.9 km	MPC · JPL
147406	2003 FR_{52}	—	March 25, 2003	Palomar	NEAT	·	3.2 km	MPC · JPL
147407	2003 FV_{56}	—	March 26, 2003	Palomar	NEAT	·	4.9 km	MPC · JPL
147408	2003 FE_{61}	—	March 26, 2003	Palomar	NEAT	EOS	4.0 km	MPC · JPL
147409	2003 FL_{65}	—	March 26, 2003	Palomar	NEAT	VER	6.3 km	MPC · JPL
147410	2003 FM_{67}	—	March 26, 2003	Palomar	NEAT	·	4.0 km	MPC · JPL
147411	2003 FG_{72}	—	March 26, 2003	Palomar	NEAT	·	3.3 km	MPC · JPL
147412	2003 FN_{79}	—	March 27, 2003	Kitt Peak	Spacewatch	EOS	4.9 km	MPC · JPL
147413	2003 FK_{89}	—	March 29, 2003	Anderson Mesa	LONEOS	EMA	4.8 km	MPC · JPL
147414	2003 FQ_{89}	—	March 29, 2003	Anderson Mesa	LONEOS	·	4.1 km	MPC · JPL
147415	2003 FG_{99}	—	March 30, 2003	Socorro	LINEAR	HYG	5.0 km	MPC · JPL
147416	2003 FO_{113}	—	March 31, 2003	Kitt Peak	Spacewatch	KOR	2.4 km	MPC · JPL
147417	2003 FH_{117}	—	March 24, 2003	Haleakala	NEAT	·	3.7 km	MPC · JPL
147418	2003 FS_{117}	—	March 25, 2003	Palomar	NEAT	·	3.2 km	MPC · JPL
147419	2003 FK_{121}	—	March 25, 2003	Anderson Mesa	LONEOS	KOR	2.0 km	MPC · JPL
147420	2003 FJ_{130}	—	March 29, 2003	Anderson Mesa	LONEOS	·	7.0 km	MPC · JPL
147421 Gárdonyi	2003 GG	Gárdonyi	April 1, 2003	Piszkéstető	K. Sárneczky	·	3.4 km	MPC · JPL
147422	2003 GR_{14}	—	April 2, 2003	Haleakala	NEAT	·	3.5 km	MPC · JPL
147423	2003 GV_{16}	—	April 4, 2003	Socorro	LINEAR	(31811)	4.2 km	MPC · JPL
147424	2003 GA_{17}	—	April 5, 2003	Haleakala	NEAT	·	3.7 km	MPC · JPL
147425	2003 GF_{37}	—	April 6, 2003	Anderson Mesa	LONEOS	·	3.4 km	MPC · JPL
147426	2003 GE_{38}	—	April 8, 2003	Socorro	LINEAR	KOR	2.6 km	MPC · JPL
147427	2003 GN_{44}	—	April 9, 2003	Palomar	NEAT	·	4.1 km	MPC · JPL
147428	2003 GM_{54}	—	April 1, 2003	Kitt Peak	Deep Lens Survey	·	4.7 km	MPC · JPL
147429	2003 HQ_{9}	—	April 25, 2003	Campo Imperatore	CINEOS	·	4.0 km	MPC · JPL
147430	2003 HE_{13}	—	April 24, 2003	Kitt Peak	Spacewatch	·	6.2 km	MPC · JPL
147431	2003 JA	—	May 1, 2003	Kitt Peak	Spacewatch	·	790 m	MPC · JPL
147432	2003 JF_{9}	—	May 2, 2003	Kitt Peak	Spacewatch	·	7.0 km	MPC · JPL
147433	2003 JS_{11}	—	May 2, 2003	Socorro	LINEAR	EOS	4.6 km	MPC · JPL
147434	2003 OM_{14}	—	July 22, 2003	Palomar	NEAT	H	840 m	MPC · JPL
147435	2003 QV_{112}	—	August 25, 2003	Palomar	NEAT	H	1.0 km	MPC · JPL
147436	2003 RV_{23}	—	September 14, 2003	Palomar	NEAT	H	1.1 km	MPC · JPL
147437	2003 SC_{18}	—	September 18, 2003	Socorro	LINEAR	H	840 m	MPC · JPL
147438	2003 UD_{14}	—	October 16, 2003	Socorro	LINEAR	H	1.2 km	MPC · JPL
147439	2003 WK_{106}	—	November 21, 2003	Socorro	LINEAR	PHO	5.0 km	MPC · JPL
147440	2003 XA_{16}	—	December 14, 2003	Kitt Peak	Spacewatch	·	2.8 km	MPC · JPL
147441	2003 XY_{17}	—	December 14, 2003	Kitt Peak	Spacewatch	PHO	2.0 km	MPC · JPL
147442	2003 XN_{26}	—	December 1, 2003	Socorro	LINEAR	·	1.4 km	MPC · JPL
147443	2003 YK_{47}	—	December 17, 2003	Kitt Peak	Spacewatch	·	1.2 km	MPC · JPL
147444	2003 YA_{50}	—	December 18, 2003	Socorro	LINEAR	·	1.2 km	MPC · JPL
147445	2003 YG_{90}	—	December 19, 2003	Kitt Peak	Spacewatch	·	1.3 km	MPC · JPL
147446	2003 YG_{94}	—	December 21, 2003	Catalina	CSS	PHO	2.1 km	MPC · JPL
147447	2003 YT_{119}	—	December 27, 2003	Socorro	LINEAR	·	1.5 km	MPC · JPL
147448	2003 YT_{136}	—	December 18, 2003	Palomar	NEAT	·	1.2 km	MPC · JPL
147449	2003 YQ_{154}	—	December 29, 2003	Catalina	CSS	H	1.6 km	MPC · JPL
147450	2003 YN_{172}	—	December 18, 2003	Kitt Peak	Spacewatch	·	1.4 km	MPC · JPL
147451	2004 BH_{3}	—	January 16, 2004	Palomar	NEAT	·	2.3 km	MPC · JPL
147452	2004 BH_{9}	—	January 17, 2004	Palomar	NEAT	·	1.5 km	MPC · JPL
147453	2004 BZ_{10}	—	January 17, 2004	Haleakala	NEAT	·	1.2 km	MPC · JPL
147454	2004 BT_{14}	—	January 16, 2004	Palomar	NEAT	·	2.1 km	MPC · JPL
147455	2004 BK_{20}	—	January 16, 2004	Catalina	CSS	·	1.3 km	MPC · JPL
147456	2004 BA_{30}	—	January 18, 2004	Palomar	NEAT	·	1.1 km	MPC · JPL
147457	2004 BC_{37}	—	January 19, 2004	Kitt Peak	Spacewatch	·	1.6 km	MPC · JPL
147458	2004 BY_{42}	—	January 22, 2004	Palomar	NEAT	fast	1.1 km	MPC · JPL
147459	2004 BV_{48}	—	January 21, 2004	Socorro	LINEAR	·	1.3 km	MPC · JPL
147460	2004 BL_{56}	—	January 23, 2004	Anderson Mesa	LONEOS	NYS	1.8 km	MPC · JPL
147461	2004 BJ_{66}	—	January 22, 2004	Socorro	LINEAR	·	1.1 km	MPC · JPL
147462	2004 BA_{87}	—	January 22, 2004	Socorro	LINEAR	·	1.2 km	MPC · JPL
147463	2004 BG_{91}	—	January 24, 2004	Socorro	LINEAR	·	970 m	MPC · JPL
147464	2004 BL_{91}	—	January 24, 2004	Socorro	LINEAR	·	1.3 km	MPC · JPL
147465	2004 BQ_{91}	—	January 24, 2004	Socorro	LINEAR	NYS	1.9 km	MPC · JPL
147466	2004 BZ_{104}	—	January 24, 2004	Socorro	LINEAR	·	2.4 km	MPC · JPL
147467	2004 BS_{108}	—	January 28, 2004	Catalina	CSS	(2076)	1.4 km	MPC · JPL
147468	2004 BJ_{114}	—	January 29, 2004	Anderson Mesa	LONEOS	·	2.5 km	MPC · JPL
147469	2004 BM_{117}	—	January 28, 2004	Catalina	CSS	·	1.3 km	MPC · JPL
147470	2004 BX_{117}	—	January 29, 2004	Socorro	LINEAR	·	1.5 km	MPC · JPL
147471	2004 BF_{149}	—	January 16, 2004	Kitt Peak	Spacewatch	·	910 m	MPC · JPL
147472	2004 BD_{152}	—	January 19, 2004	Anderson Mesa	LONEOS	·	1.1 km	MPC · JPL
147473	2004 CC_{7}	—	February 10, 2004	Catalina	CSS	·	1.8 km	MPC · JPL
147474	2004 CG_{19}	—	February 11, 2004	Kitt Peak	Spacewatch	·	1.3 km	MPC · JPL
147475	2004 CE_{24}	—	February 12, 2004	Kitt Peak	Spacewatch	·	2.0 km	MPC · JPL
147476	2004 CK_{24}	—	February 12, 2004	Kitt Peak	Spacewatch	MAS	1.4 km	MPC · JPL
147477	2004 CV_{26}	—	February 11, 2004	Palomar	NEAT	·	1.3 km	MPC · JPL
147478	2004 CZ_{29}	—	February 12, 2004	Kitt Peak	Spacewatch	NYS	1.4 km	MPC · JPL
147479	2004 CH_{30}	—	February 12, 2004	Kitt Peak	Spacewatch	NYS	2.1 km	MPC · JPL
147480	2004 CA_{35}	—	February 13, 2004	Kitt Peak	Spacewatch	·	2.7 km	MPC · JPL
147481	2004 CO_{37}	—	February 12, 2004	Palomar	NEAT	·	4.3 km	MPC · JPL
147482	2004 CS_{40}	—	February 12, 2004	Kitt Peak	Spacewatch	NYS	1.4 km	MPC · JPL
147483	2004 CW_{42}	—	February 11, 2004	Anderson Mesa	LONEOS	·	1.9 km	MPC · JPL
147484	2004 CR_{53}	—	February 11, 2004	Kitt Peak	Spacewatch	·	2.4 km	MPC · JPL
147485	2004 CU_{54}	—	February 11, 2004	Palomar	NEAT	·	1.8 km	MPC · JPL
147486	2004 CV_{55}	—	February 13, 2004	Palomar	NEAT	·	1.4 km	MPC · JPL
147487	2004 CJ_{56}	—	February 14, 2004	Haleakala	NEAT	MAS	990 m	MPC · JPL
147488	2004 CM_{67}	—	February 10, 2004	Palomar	NEAT	·	2.2 km	MPC · JPL
147489	2004 CA_{74}	—	February 15, 2004	Palomar	NEAT	·	2.1 km	MPC · JPL
147490	2004 CM_{75}	—	February 11, 2004	Anderson Mesa	LONEOS	·	930 m	MPC · JPL
147491	2004 CO_{77}	—	February 11, 2004	Palomar	NEAT	·	3.3 km	MPC · JPL
147492	2004 CW_{78}	—	February 11, 2004	Palomar	NEAT	MAS	1.2 km	MPC · JPL
147493	2004 CA_{79}	—	February 11, 2004	Palomar	NEAT	·	1.5 km	MPC · JPL
147494	2004 CS_{85}	—	February 14, 2004	Kitt Peak	Spacewatch	·	1 km	MPC · JPL
147495	2004 CQ_{86}	—	February 14, 2004	Haleakala	NEAT	·	1.1 km	MPC · JPL
147496	2004 CE_{95}	—	February 13, 2004	Palomar	NEAT	NYS	1.4 km	MPC · JPL
147497	2004 CO_{99}	—	February 15, 2004	Catalina	CSS	NYS	2.2 km	MPC · JPL
147498	2004 CZ_{99}	—	February 15, 2004	Catalina	CSS	NYS	3.6 km	MPC · JPL
147499	2004 CR_{100}	—	February 15, 2004	Catalina	CSS	·	1.2 km	MPC · JPL
147500	2004 CX_{100}	—	February 15, 2004	Catalina	CSS	·	2.0 km	MPC · JPL

== 147501–147600 ==
back to top

Designation			Discovery			Properties		Ref
Permanent	Provisional	Named after	Date	Site	Discoverer(s)	Category	Diam.	Ref
147501	2004 CJ_{103}	—	February 12, 2004	Palomar	NEAT	·	2.5 km	MPC · JPL
147502	2004 CT_{103}	—	February 12, 2004	Palomar	NEAT	·	2.0 km	MPC · JPL
147503	2004 CW_{104}	—	February 13, 2004	Palomar	NEAT	·	1.3 km	MPC · JPL
147504	2004 CU_{105}	—	February 14, 2004	Palomar	NEAT	·	2.2 km	MPC · JPL
147505	2004 CW_{106}	—	February 14, 2004	Palomar	NEAT	·	2.5 km	MPC · JPL
147506	2004 CF_{107}	—	February 14, 2004	Palomar	NEAT	·	1.4 km	MPC · JPL
147507	2004 CQ_{130}	—	February 15, 2004	Socorro	LINEAR	·	4.0 km	MPC · JPL
147508	2004 DA_{5}	—	February 16, 2004	Kitt Peak	Spacewatch	·	1.8 km	MPC · JPL
147509	2004 DD_{6}	—	February 16, 2004	Kitt Peak	Spacewatch	·	1.5 km	MPC · JPL
147510	2004 DR_{9}	—	February 17, 2004	Socorro	LINEAR	·	2.3 km	MPC · JPL
147511	2004 DS_{9}	—	February 17, 2004	Socorro	LINEAR	·	1.6 km	MPC · JPL
147512	2004 DH_{14}	—	February 16, 2004	Catalina	CSS	·	1.9 km	MPC · JPL
147513	2004 DW_{16}	—	February 18, 2004	Socorro	LINEAR	·	1.5 km	MPC · JPL
147514	2004 DU_{18}	—	February 18, 2004	Haleakala	NEAT	·	2.2 km	MPC · JPL
147515	2004 DM_{20}	—	February 17, 2004	Catalina	CSS	·	1.6 km	MPC · JPL
147516	2004 DH_{37}	—	February 19, 2004	Socorro	LINEAR	·	1.5 km	MPC · JPL
147517	2004 DJ_{37}	—	February 19, 2004	Socorro	LINEAR	·	1.3 km	MPC · JPL
147518	2004 DT_{37}	—	February 19, 2004	Socorro	LINEAR	·	2.6 km	MPC · JPL
147519	2004 DV_{37}	—	February 19, 2004	Socorro	LINEAR	·	1.3 km	MPC · JPL
147520	2004 DJ_{40}	—	February 18, 2004	Desert Eagle	W. K. Y. Yeung	·	1.3 km	MPC · JPL
147521	2004 DK_{41}	—	February 18, 2004	Haleakala	NEAT	·	2.2 km	MPC · JPL
147522	2004 DY_{41}	—	February 19, 2004	Socorro	LINEAR	·	1.4 km	MPC · JPL
147523	2004 DC_{42}	—	February 19, 2004	Socorro	LINEAR	·	1.9 km	MPC · JPL
147524	2004 DE_{42}	—	February 19, 2004	Socorro	LINEAR	·	1.2 km	MPC · JPL
147525	2004 DQ_{45}	—	February 26, 2004	Desert Eagle	W. K. Y. Yeung	·	2.0 km	MPC · JPL
147526	2004 DY_{45}	—	February 23, 2004	Socorro	LINEAR	NYS	2.4 km	MPC · JPL
147527	2004 DG_{47}	—	February 19, 2004	Socorro	LINEAR	·	1.9 km	MPC · JPL
147528	2004 DO_{52}	—	February 25, 2004	Socorro	LINEAR	·	960 m	MPC · JPL
147529	2004 DP_{53}	—	February 26, 2004	Goodricke-Pigott	R. A. Tucker	·	1.5 km	MPC · JPL
147530	2004 DF_{60}	—	February 26, 2004	Socorro	LINEAR	NYS	2.4 km	MPC · JPL
147531	2004 DS_{62}	—	February 26, 2004	Socorro	LINEAR	·	1.8 km	MPC · JPL
147532	2004 DF_{66}	—	February 23, 2004	Socorro	LINEAR	NYS	2.0 km	MPC · JPL
147533	2004 EN_{3}	—	March 10, 2004	Catalina	CSS	·	1.6 km	MPC · JPL
147534	2004 EF_{6}	—	March 12, 2004	Palomar	NEAT	·	1.3 km	MPC · JPL
147535	2004 EH_{14}	—	March 11, 2004	Palomar	NEAT	NYS ·	3.8 km	MPC · JPL
147536	2004 EK_{14}	—	March 11, 2004	Palomar	NEAT	·	1.5 km	MPC · JPL
147537	2004 EF_{15}	—	March 11, 2004	Palomar	NEAT	V	1.2 km	MPC · JPL
147538	2004 EF_{24}	—	March 15, 2004	Črni Vrh	Matičič, S.	·	1.8 km	MPC · JPL
147539	2004 EB_{27}	—	March 14, 2004	Catalina	CSS	·	1.8 km	MPC · JPL
147540	2004 EC_{28}	—	March 15, 2004	Kitt Peak	Spacewatch	MAS	1.2 km	MPC · JPL
147541	2004 EO_{31}	—	March 14, 2004	Palomar	NEAT	·	2.2 km	MPC · JPL
147542	2004 ET_{31}	—	March 14, 2004	Palomar	NEAT	·	1.6 km	MPC · JPL
147543	2004 ED_{33}	—	March 15, 2004	Palomar	NEAT	·	2.0 km	MPC · JPL
147544	2004 EN_{36}	—	March 13, 2004	Palomar	NEAT	·	1.3 km	MPC · JPL
147545	2004 EA_{50}	—	March 12, 2004	Palomar	NEAT	NYS · fast	2.7 km	MPC · JPL
147546	2004 EN_{50}	—	March 14, 2004	Kitt Peak	Spacewatch	·	970 m	MPC · JPL
147547	2004 EQ_{52}	—	March 15, 2004	Catalina	CSS	·	1.9 km	MPC · JPL
147548	2004 EY_{59}	—	March 15, 2004	Catalina	CSS	·	1.2 km	MPC · JPL
147549	2004 EO_{61}	—	March 12, 2004	Palomar	NEAT	slow	1.9 km	MPC · JPL
147550	2004 EQ_{63}	—	March 13, 2004	Palomar	NEAT	·	2.6 km	MPC · JPL
147551	2004 EB_{80}	—	March 14, 2004	Socorro	LINEAR	V	1.4 km	MPC · JPL
147552	2004 EV_{85}	—	March 15, 2004	Socorro	LINEAR	·	1.9 km	MPC · JPL
147553	2004 EW_{85}	—	March 15, 2004	Socorro	LINEAR	·	1.3 km	MPC · JPL
147554	2004 EE_{96}	—	March 15, 2004	Catalina	CSS	HNS	2.0 km	MPC · JPL
147555	2004 FU_{11}	—	March 16, 2004	Catalina	CSS	(2076)	1.4 km	MPC · JPL
147556	2004 FK_{14}	—	March 16, 2004	Catalina	CSS	·	1.7 km	MPC · JPL
147557	2004 FY_{14}	—	March 16, 2004	Catalina	CSS	NYS	1.3 km	MPC · JPL
147558	2004 FZ_{14}	—	March 16, 2004	Catalina	CSS	·	1.2 km	MPC · JPL
147559	2004 FR_{20}	—	March 16, 2004	Catalina	CSS	NYS	1.8 km	MPC · JPL
147560	2004 FN_{25}	—	March 17, 2004	Socorro	LINEAR	slow	2.4 km	MPC · JPL
147561	2004 FD_{26}	—	March 17, 2004	Socorro	LINEAR	·	1.7 km	MPC · JPL
147562	2004 FD_{31}	—	March 30, 2004	Socorro	LINEAR	PHO	4.5 km	MPC · JPL
147563	2004 FA_{33}	—	March 16, 2004	Catalina	CSS	V	1.4 km	MPC · JPL
147564	2004 FM_{33}	—	March 16, 2004	Catalina	CSS	·	1.7 km	MPC · JPL
147565	2004 FL_{34}	—	March 16, 2004	Socorro	LINEAR	·	2.5 km	MPC · JPL
147566	2004 FB_{37}	—	March 16, 2004	Campo Imperatore	CINEOS	·	2.8 km	MPC · JPL
147567	2004 FE_{41}	—	March 18, 2004	Socorro	LINEAR	NYS	1.5 km	MPC · JPL
147568	2004 FW_{45}	—	March 16, 2004	Kitt Peak	Spacewatch	·	2.0 km	MPC · JPL
147569	2004 FN_{50}	—	March 18, 2004	Socorro	LINEAR	·	1.2 km	MPC · JPL
147570	2004 FK_{53}	—	March 17, 2004	Kitt Peak	Spacewatch	(5)	1.8 km	MPC · JPL
147571	2004 FH_{55}	—	March 19, 2004	Kitt Peak	Spacewatch	·	3.4 km	MPC · JPL
147572	2004 FK_{58}	—	March 17, 2004	Socorro	LINEAR	·	1.2 km	MPC · JPL
147573	2004 FW_{62}	—	March 19, 2004	Socorro	LINEAR	NYS ·	4.4 km	MPC · JPL
147574	2004 FC_{67}	—	March 20, 2004	Socorro	LINEAR	·	1.4 km	MPC · JPL
147575	2004 FR_{69}	—	March 16, 2004	Kitt Peak	Spacewatch	·	1.8 km	MPC · JPL
147576	2004 FA_{94}	—	March 22, 2004	Socorro	LINEAR	NYS	1.9 km	MPC · JPL
147577	2004 FR_{97}	—	March 23, 2004	Socorro	LINEAR	·	1.2 km	MPC · JPL
147578	2004 FL_{107}	—	March 20, 2004	Socorro	LINEAR	NYS	2.9 km	MPC · JPL
147579	2004 FF_{110}	—	March 24, 2004	Anderson Mesa	LONEOS	·	2.8 km	MPC · JPL
147580	2004 FW_{125}	—	March 27, 2004	Socorro	LINEAR	·	1.2 km	MPC · JPL
147581	2004 FR_{126}	—	March 27, 2004	Socorro	LINEAR	·	1.5 km	MPC · JPL
147582	2004 FG_{130}	—	March 22, 2004	Anderson Mesa	LONEOS	·	1.8 km	MPC · JPL
147583	2004 FR_{130}	—	March 22, 2004	Anderson Mesa	LONEOS	·	2.5 km	MPC · JPL
147584	2004 FB_{134}	—	March 26, 2004	Anderson Mesa	LONEOS	·	1.6 km	MPC · JPL
147585	2004 FX_{134}	—	March 26, 2004	Socorro	LINEAR	·	1.4 km	MPC · JPL
147586	2004 FW_{141}	—	March 27, 2004	Catalina	CSS	·	1.6 km	MPC · JPL
147587	2004 FU_{161}	—	March 18, 2004	Socorro	LINEAR	NYS	1.4 km	MPC · JPL
147588	2004 FN_{162}	—	March 18, 2004	Kitt Peak	Spacewatch	·	1.0 km	MPC · JPL
147589	2004 GG	—	April 8, 2004	Siding Spring	SSS	·	5.0 km	MPC · JPL
147590	2004 GR_{1}	—	April 9, 2004	Siding Spring	SSS	·	1.9 km	MPC · JPL
147591	2004 GL_{8}	—	April 12, 2004	Kitt Peak	Spacewatch	·	3.9 km	MPC · JPL
147592	2004 GT_{13}	—	April 13, 2004	Palomar	NEAT	·	2.1 km	MPC · JPL
147593	2004 GV_{14}	—	April 13, 2004	Siding Spring	SSS	·	3.2 km	MPC · JPL
147594	2004 GF_{16}	—	April 10, 2004	Palomar	NEAT	·	1.2 km	MPC · JPL
147595 Gojkomitić	2004 GE_{20}	Gojkomitić	April 14, 2004	Drebach	~Knöfel, A., G. Lehmann	·	1.7 km	MPC · JPL
147596	2004 GB_{25}	—	April 13, 2004	Siding Spring	SSS	·	2.8 km	MPC · JPL
147597	2004 GW_{25}	—	April 14, 2004	Anderson Mesa	LONEOS	·	1.8 km	MPC · JPL
147598	2004 GT_{26}	—	April 14, 2004	Anderson Mesa	LONEOS	·	2.8 km	MPC · JPL
147599	2004 GU_{26}	—	April 14, 2004	Anderson Mesa	LONEOS	·	3.4 km	MPC · JPL
147600	2004 GV_{26}	—	April 14, 2004	Anderson Mesa	LONEOS	·	4.1 km	MPC · JPL

== 147601–147700 ==
back to top

Designation			Discovery			Properties		Ref
Permanent	Provisional	Named after	Date	Site	Discoverer(s)	Category	Diam.	Ref
147601	2004 GX_{29}	—	April 12, 2004	Kitt Peak	Spacewatch	·	2.1 km	MPC · JPL
147602	2004 GN_{30}	—	April 12, 2004	Kitt Peak	Spacewatch	·	1.1 km	MPC · JPL
147603	2004 GM_{32}	—	April 12, 2004	Palomar	NEAT	·	1.4 km	MPC · JPL
147604	2004 GS_{34}	—	April 13, 2004	Palomar	NEAT	·	1.5 km	MPC · JPL
147605	2004 GP_{37}	—	April 14, 2004	Anderson Mesa	LONEOS	·	2.6 km	MPC · JPL
147606	2004 GJ_{39}	—	April 15, 2004	Anderson Mesa	LONEOS	·	4.6 km	MPC · JPL
147607	2004 GG_{43}	—	April 12, 2004	Kitt Peak	Spacewatch	NYS	3.4 km	MPC · JPL
147608	2004 GB_{44}	—	April 12, 2004	Kitt Peak	Spacewatch	·	1.5 km	MPC · JPL
147609	2004 GE_{51}	—	April 13, 2004	Kitt Peak	Spacewatch	·	2.5 km	MPC · JPL
147610	2004 GT_{54}	—	April 13, 2004	Kitt Peak	Spacewatch	·	2.1 km	MPC · JPL
147611	2004 GV_{59}	—	April 13, 2004	Kitt Peak	Spacewatch	·	1.0 km	MPC · JPL
147612	2004 GP_{88}	—	April 12, 2004	Kitt Peak	Spacewatch	·	4.9 km	MPC · JPL
147613	2004 HJ_{3}	—	April 16, 2004	Anderson Mesa	LONEOS	·	2.0 km	MPC · JPL
147614	2004 HX_{3}	—	April 16, 2004	Palomar	NEAT	·	2.6 km	MPC · JPL
147615	2004 HE_{8}	—	April 16, 2004	Kitt Peak	Spacewatch	·	2.5 km	MPC · JPL
147616	2004 HS_{9}	—	April 17, 2004	Socorro	LINEAR	NYS	1.6 km	MPC · JPL
147617	2004 HF_{10}	—	April 17, 2004	Socorro	LINEAR	·	2.0 km	MPC · JPL
147618	2004 HG_{10}	—	April 17, 2004	Socorro	LINEAR	NYS	1.6 km	MPC · JPL
147619	2004 HW_{12}	—	April 16, 2004	Kitt Peak	Spacewatch	·	1.6 km	MPC · JPL
147620	2004 HQ_{17}	—	April 17, 2004	Socorro	LINEAR	·	1.9 km	MPC · JPL
147621	2004 HD_{20}	—	April 20, 2004	Socorro	LINEAR	·	2.0 km	MPC · JPL
147622	2004 HS_{25}	—	April 19, 2004	Socorro	LINEAR	·	3.0 km	MPC · JPL
147623	2004 HC_{27}	—	April 20, 2004	Catalina	CSS	·	3.5 km	MPC · JPL
147624	2004 HP_{36}	—	April 22, 2004	Socorro	LINEAR	·	2.7 km	MPC · JPL
147625	2004 HY_{42}	—	April 20, 2004	Socorro	LINEAR	·	2.2 km	MPC · JPL
147626	2004 HF_{44}	—	April 21, 2004	Socorro	LINEAR	·	3.5 km	MPC · JPL
147627	2004 HR_{45}	—	April 21, 2004	Socorro	LINEAR	·	1.8 km	MPC · JPL
147628	2004 HQ_{46}	—	April 22, 2004	Kitt Peak	Spacewatch	·	5.5 km	MPC · JPL
147629	2004 HE_{48}	—	April 22, 2004	Siding Spring	SSS	·	2.8 km	MPC · JPL
147630	2004 HN_{49}	—	April 23, 2004	Socorro	LINEAR	·	1.7 km	MPC · JPL
147631	2004 HH_{52}	—	April 24, 2004	Socorro	LINEAR	EUN	2.4 km	MPC · JPL
147632	2004 HL_{54}	—	April 20, 2004	Socorro	LINEAR	·	2.0 km	MPC · JPL
147633	2004 HD_{58}	—	April 22, 2004	Kitt Peak	Spacewatch	·	2.2 km	MPC · JPL
147634	2004 HH_{58}	—	April 22, 2004	Kitt Peak	Spacewatch	·	1.7 km	MPC · JPL
147635	2004 HW_{63}	—	April 16, 2004	Socorro	LINEAR	·	2.7 km	MPC · JPL
147636	2004 HC_{67}	—	April 21, 2004	Kitt Peak	Spacewatch	·	1.6 km	MPC · JPL
147637	2004 JO_{6}	—	May 9, 2004	Palomar	NEAT	·	2.5 km	MPC · JPL
147638	2004 JZ_{8}	—	May 13, 2004	Anderson Mesa	LONEOS	·	5.4 km	MPC · JPL
147639	2004 JT_{10}	—	May 12, 2004	Catalina	CSS	·	4.0 km	MPC · JPL
147640	2004 JD_{12}	—	May 11, 2004	Siding Spring	SSS	EUN	2.5 km	MPC · JPL
147641	2004 JS_{13}	—	May 9, 2004	Kitt Peak	Spacewatch	·	2.6 km	MPC · JPL
147642	2004 JL_{15}	—	May 10, 2004	Palomar	NEAT	·	4.1 km	MPC · JPL
147643	2004 JE_{17}	—	May 12, 2004	Siding Spring	SSS	·	1.9 km	MPC · JPL
147644	2004 JB_{23}	—	May 12, 2004	Siding Spring	SSS	·	4.6 km	MPC · JPL
147645	2004 JG_{24}	—	May 15, 2004	Socorro	LINEAR	·	2.7 km	MPC · JPL
147646	2004 JK_{25}	—	May 15, 2004	Socorro	LINEAR	·	1.4 km	MPC · JPL
147647	2004 JB_{26}	—	May 15, 2004	Socorro	LINEAR	·	2.2 km	MPC · JPL
147648	2004 JK_{26}	—	May 15, 2004	Socorro	LINEAR	·	2.6 km	MPC · JPL
147649	2004 JT_{27}	—	May 15, 2004	Socorro	LINEAR	EOS	3.3 km	MPC · JPL
147650	2004 JB_{32}	—	May 12, 2004	Catalina	CSS	·	4.7 km	MPC · JPL
147651	2004 JO_{32}	—	May 15, 2004	Socorro	LINEAR	HOF	4.8 km	MPC · JPL
147652	2004 JA_{35}	—	May 15, 2004	Socorro	LINEAR	(5)	3.7 km	MPC · JPL
147653	2004 JF_{35}	—	May 15, 2004	Socorro	LINEAR	·	4.3 km	MPC · JPL
147654	2004 JM_{35}	—	May 15, 2004	Socorro	LINEAR	·	2.8 km	MPC · JPL
147655	2004 JF_{36}	—	May 15, 2004	Needville	Garossino, P.	·	2.1 km	MPC · JPL
147656	2004 JZ_{36}	—	May 13, 2004	Kitt Peak	Spacewatch	·	4.4 km	MPC · JPL
147657	2004 JG_{37}	—	May 13, 2004	Palomar	NEAT	·	1.4 km	MPC · JPL
147658	2004 JP_{41}	—	May 15, 2004	Socorro	LINEAR	·	1.8 km	MPC · JPL
147659	2004 JT_{41}	—	May 15, 2004	Socorro	LINEAR	·	1.3 km	MPC · JPL
147660	2004 JP_{44}	—	May 15, 2004	Socorro	LINEAR	·	1.3 km	MPC · JPL
147661	2004 JN_{51}	—	May 14, 2004	Socorro	LINEAR	GEF	2.8 km	MPC · JPL
147662	2004 JZ_{54}	—	May 10, 2004	Kitt Peak	Spacewatch	·	2.9 km	MPC · JPL
147663	2004 KD	—	May 16, 2004	Reedy Creek	J. Broughton	·	2.7 km	MPC · JPL
147664	2004 KC_{4}	—	May 16, 2004	Socorro	LINEAR	TIR	2.5 km	MPC · JPL
147665	2004 KO_{4}	—	May 17, 2004	Socorro	LINEAR	·	2.3 km	MPC · JPL
147666	2004 KV_{6}	—	May 19, 2004	Kitt Peak	Spacewatch	·	1.8 km	MPC · JPL
147667	2004 KU_{9}	—	May 19, 2004	Socorro	LINEAR	·	2.1 km	MPC · JPL
147668	2004 KQ_{12}	—	May 22, 2004	Catalina	CSS	·	2.8 km	MPC · JPL
147669	2004 KG_{15}	—	May 23, 2004	Socorro	LINEAR	slow	3.5 km	MPC · JPL
147670	2004 LT_{3}	—	June 11, 2004	Socorro	LINEAR	·	2.6 km	MPC · JPL
147671	2004 LJ_{9}	—	June 13, 2004	Kitt Peak	Spacewatch	NAE	5.2 km	MPC · JPL
147672	2004 LO_{10}	—	June 8, 2004	Kitt Peak	Spacewatch	PAD	3.6 km	MPC · JPL
147673	2004 LO_{15}	—	June 12, 2004	Socorro	LINEAR	·	5.7 km	MPC · JPL
147674	2004 LY_{18}	—	June 11, 2004	Kitt Peak	Spacewatch	·	2.1 km	MPC · JPL
147675	2004 ML	—	June 16, 2004	Socorro	LINEAR	NEM	4.2 km	MPC · JPL
147676	2004 MH_{3}	—	June 19, 2004	Socorro	LINEAR	·	3.4 km	MPC · JPL
147677	2004 NS_{2}	—	July 10, 2004	Palomar	NEAT	·	3.3 km	MPC · JPL
147678	2004 NP_{10}	—	July 9, 2004	Socorro	LINEAR	·	8.3 km	MPC · JPL
147679	2004 NF_{14}	—	July 11, 2004	Socorro	LINEAR	·	4.7 km	MPC · JPL
147680	2004 OL_{2}	—	July 16, 2004	Socorro	LINEAR	·	5.3 km	MPC · JPL
147681	2004 OS_{3}	—	July 16, 2004	Socorro	LINEAR	·	4.9 km	MPC · JPL
147682	2004 OH_{4}	—	July 17, 2004	Reedy Creek	J. Broughton	·	4.4 km	MPC · JPL
147683	2004 OS_{14}	—	July 21, 2004	Siding Spring	SSS	·	2.6 km	MPC · JPL
147684	2004 PU_{39}	—	August 9, 2004	Socorro	LINEAR	·	3.2 km	MPC · JPL
147685	2004 PX_{54}	—	August 8, 2004	Anderson Mesa	LONEOS	VER	5.1 km	MPC · JPL
147686	2004 PJ_{66}	—	August 10, 2004	Campo Imperatore	CINEOS	EOS	3.1 km	MPC · JPL
147687	2004 PZ_{66}	—	August 9, 2004	Socorro	LINEAR	·	5.6 km	MPC · JPL
147688	2004 PD_{70}	—	August 7, 2004	Siding Spring	SSS	·	2.6 km	MPC · JPL
147689	2004 PR_{77}	—	August 9, 2004	Socorro	LINEAR	·	3.3 km	MPC · JPL
147690	2004 QW_{3}	—	August 16, 2004	Palomar	NEAT	EOS	3.7 km	MPC · JPL
147691	2004 RC_{152}	—	September 10, 2004	Socorro	LINEAR	·	7.9 km	MPC · JPL
147692	2004 RY_{214}	—	September 11, 2004	Socorro	LINEAR	·	8.2 km	MPC · JPL
147693 Piccioni	2005 CQ_{77}	Piccioni	February 11, 2005	La Silla	A. Boattini, H. Scholl	·	1.7 km	MPC · JPL
147694	2005 ED_{199}	—	March 11, 2005	Mount Lemmon	Mount Lemmon Survey	·	1.2 km	MPC · JPL
147695	2005 EY_{283}	—	March 11, 2005	Kitt Peak	Spacewatch	·	1.7 km	MPC · JPL
147696	2005 GB_{37}	—	April 2, 2005	Catalina	CSS	PHO	1.8 km	MPC · JPL
147697	2005 GA_{38}	—	April 3, 2005	Palomar	NEAT	·	1.6 km	MPC · JPL
147698	2005 GQ_{40}	—	April 4, 2005	Mount Lemmon	Mount Lemmon Survey	·	1.3 km	MPC · JPL
147699	2005 GJ_{57}	—	April 6, 2005	Mount Lemmon	Mount Lemmon Survey	·	1.7 km	MPC · JPL
147700	2005 GU_{83}	—	April 4, 2005	Kitt Peak	Spacewatch	·	1.5 km	MPC · JPL

== 147701–147800 ==
back to top

Designation			Discovery			Properties		Ref
Permanent	Provisional	Named after	Date	Site	Discoverer(s)	Category	Diam.	Ref
147701	2005 GY_{89}	—	April 5, 2005	Kitt Peak	Spacewatch	NYS	1.9 km	MPC · JPL
147702	2005 GD_{143}	—	April 10, 2005	Mount Lemmon	Mount Lemmon Survey	·	3.0 km	MPC · JPL
147703 Madras	2005 GU_{203}	Madras	April 10, 2005	Kitt Peak	M. W. Buie	·	1.5 km	MPC · JPL
147704 Gartenberg	2005 GN_{205}	Gartenberg	April 11, 2005	Kitt Peak	M. W. Buie	·	1.2 km	MPC · JPL
147705	2005 GT_{210}	—	April 14, 2005	Catalina	CSS	H	780 m	MPC · JPL
147706	2005 GZ_{214}	—	April 9, 2005	Socorro	LINEAR	·	1.5 km	MPC · JPL
147707	2005 JH_{26}	—	May 3, 2005	Kitt Peak	Spacewatch	·	1.4 km	MPC · JPL
147708	2005 JA_{50}	—	May 4, 2005	Kitt Peak	Spacewatch	·	1.2 km	MPC · JPL
147709	2005 JY_{72}	—	May 8, 2005	Kitt Peak	Spacewatch	·	2.5 km	MPC · JPL
147710	2005 JU_{83}	—	May 8, 2005	Kitt Peak	Spacewatch	·	1.5 km	MPC · JPL
147711	2005 JH_{102}	—	May 9, 2005	Kitt Peak	Spacewatch	MAR	1.5 km	MPC · JPL
147712	2005 JB_{163}	—	May 8, 2005	Mount Lemmon	Mount Lemmon Survey	MRX	1.7 km	MPC · JPL
147713	2005 JC_{177}	—	May 12, 2005	Palomar	NEAT	·	1.6 km	MPC · JPL
147714	2005 KG_{6}	—	May 16, 2005	Palomar	NEAT	·	2.2 km	MPC · JPL
147715	2005 KO_{6}	—	May 18, 2005	Siding Spring	SSS	·	1.8 km	MPC · JPL
147716	2005 KY_{12}	—	May 19, 2005	Mount Lemmon	Mount Lemmon Survey	·	4.1 km	MPC · JPL
147717	2005 LS_{7}	—	June 5, 2005	Socorro	LINEAR	·	1.9 km	MPC · JPL
147718	2005 LJ_{43}	—	June 8, 2005	Kitt Peak	Spacewatch	·	1.6 km	MPC · JPL
147719	2005 LL_{48}	—	June 9, 2005	Catalina	CSS	·	2.4 km	MPC · JPL
147720	2005 LB_{51}	—	June 13, 2005	Mount Lemmon	Mount Lemmon Survey	·	2.3 km	MPC · JPL
147721	2005 MK_{1}	—	June 17, 2005	Mount Lemmon	Mount Lemmon Survey	·	3.4 km	MPC · JPL
147722	2005 MJ_{5}	—	June 21, 2005	Palomar	NEAT	NYS	1.9 km	MPC · JPL
147723	2005 MX_{9}	—	June 23, 2005	Palomar	NEAT	MAS	1.6 km	MPC · JPL
147724	2005 MR_{12}	—	June 28, 2005	Palomar	NEAT	PHO	2.1 km	MPC · JPL
147725	2005 MD_{13}	—	June 29, 2005	Palomar	NEAT	V	1.1 km	MPC · JPL
147726	2005 MU_{20}	—	June 30, 2005	Kitt Peak	Spacewatch	·	2.0 km	MPC · JPL
147727	2005 MA_{32}	—	June 28, 2005	Palomar	NEAT	·	3.0 km	MPC · JPL
147728	2005 MD_{33}	—	June 29, 2005	Kitt Peak	Spacewatch	·	1.5 km	MPC · JPL
147729	2005 MP_{34}	—	June 29, 2005	Palomar	NEAT	NYS	2.0 km	MPC · JPL
147730	2005 MO_{38}	—	June 30, 2005	Kitt Peak	Spacewatch	·	2.8 km	MPC · JPL
147731	2005 MG_{41}	—	June 30, 2005	Kitt Peak	Spacewatch	·	1.9 km	MPC · JPL
147732	2005 MQ_{42}	—	June 29, 2005	Kitt Peak	Spacewatch	·	2.4 km	MPC · JPL
147733	2005 MV_{44}	—	June 27, 2005	Kitt Peak	Spacewatch	·	1.9 km	MPC · JPL
147734	2005 ME_{53}	—	June 29, 2005	Palomar	NEAT	·	2.9 km	MPC · JPL
147735	2005 NE	—	July 2, 2005	Wrightwood	J. W. Young	·	3.0 km	MPC · JPL
147736 Raxavinic	2005 NC_{1}	Raxavinic	July 2, 2005	RAS	Hutsebaut, R.	·	6.0 km	MPC · JPL
147737	2005 NM_{1}	—	July 1, 2005	Kitt Peak	Spacewatch	V	1.1 km	MPC · JPL
147738	2005 NU_{3}	—	July 1, 2005	Kitt Peak	Spacewatch	ERI	2.5 km	MPC · JPL
147739	2005 NP_{9}	—	July 1, 2005	Kitt Peak	Spacewatch	·	2.9 km	MPC · JPL
147740	2005 NW_{9}	—	July 1, 2005	Kitt Peak	Spacewatch	AGN	1.6 km	MPC · JPL
147741	2005 NA_{17}	—	July 3, 2005	Palomar	NEAT	·	3.3 km	MPC · JPL
147742	2005 NJ_{28}	—	July 5, 2005	Palomar	NEAT	·	1.3 km	MPC · JPL
147743	2005 NU_{30}	—	July 4, 2005	Kitt Peak	Spacewatch	AST	3.0 km	MPC · JPL
147744	2005 NV_{30}	—	July 4, 2005	Kitt Peak	Spacewatch	MAS	1.1 km	MPC · JPL
147745 Novemberkelly	2005 NK_{67}	Novemberkelly	July 2, 2005	Catalina	CSS	·	1.9 km	MPC · JPL
147746	2005 NT_{75}	—	July 10, 2005	Kitt Peak	Spacewatch	·	1.5 km	MPC · JPL
147747	2005 NY_{83}	—	July 1, 2005	Kitt Peak	Spacewatch	KOR	2.1 km	MPC · JPL
147748	2005 NB_{84}	—	July 1, 2005	Kitt Peak	Spacewatch	·	1.4 km	MPC · JPL
147749	2005 NS_{89}	—	July 4, 2005	Palomar	NEAT	·	1.8 km	MPC · JPL
147750	2005 NB_{122}	—	July 5, 2005	Mount Lemmon	Mount Lemmon Survey	·	2.4 km	MPC · JPL
147751	2005 OR_{9}	—	July 27, 2005	Palomar	NEAT	·	2.4 km	MPC · JPL
147752	2005 OB_{11}	—	July 28, 2005	Palomar	NEAT	NEM	4.1 km	MPC · JPL
147753	2005 OG_{11}	—	July 28, 2005	Palomar	NEAT	NYS	1.7 km	MPC · JPL
147754	2005 OO_{13}	—	July 29, 2005	Palomar	NEAT	·	910 m	MPC · JPL
147755	2005 OB_{22}	—	July 29, 2005	Palomar	NEAT	·	1.7 km	MPC · JPL
147756	2005 OY_{22}	—	July 29, 2005	Palomar	NEAT	EOS	3.2 km	MPC · JPL
147757	2005 OV_{24}	—	July 31, 2005	Palomar	NEAT	EOS	2.8 km	MPC · JPL
147758	2005 PW_{12}	—	August 4, 2005	Palomar	NEAT	·	3.2 km	MPC · JPL
147759	2005 QR_{5}	—	August 23, 2005	Haleakala	NEAT	·	3.5 km	MPC · JPL
147760	2005 QH_{8}	—	August 25, 2005	Palomar	NEAT	EOS	3.1 km	MPC · JPL
147761	2005 QJ_{10}	—	August 25, 2005	Campo Imperatore	CINEOS	NYS	2.2 km	MPC · JPL
147762	2005 QA_{17}	—	August 25, 2005	Palomar	NEAT	·	4.4 km	MPC · JPL
147763	2005 QS_{21}	—	August 26, 2005	Siding Spring	SSS	EUN	2.1 km	MPC · JPL
147764	2005 QN_{32}	—	August 24, 2005	Palomar	NEAT	·	3.7 km	MPC · JPL
147765	2005 QP_{32}	—	August 24, 2005	Haleakala	NEAT	V	1.4 km	MPC · JPL
147766 Elisatoffoli	2005 QB_{39}	Elisatoffoli	August 26, 2005	CAOS	Tagliaferri, U., F. Mallia	·	5.0 km	MPC · JPL
147767	2005 QM_{44}	—	August 26, 2005	Palomar	NEAT	KOR	2.5 km	MPC · JPL
147768	2005 QP_{44}	—	August 26, 2005	Palomar	NEAT	MAS	1.3 km	MPC · JPL
147769	2005 QJ_{47}	—	August 26, 2005	Palomar	NEAT	CLA	3.3 km	MPC · JPL
147770	2005 QV_{53}	—	August 28, 2005	Kitt Peak	Spacewatch	·	2.7 km	MPC · JPL
147771	2005 QE_{63}	—	August 26, 2005	Palomar	NEAT	·	4.3 km	MPC · JPL
147772	2005 QT_{78}	—	August 25, 2005	Palomar	NEAT	(21344)	2.5 km	MPC · JPL
147773	2005 QF_{82}	—	August 29, 2005	Anderson Mesa	LONEOS	·	1.6 km	MPC · JPL
147774	2005 QR_{89}	—	August 22, 2005	Palomar	NEAT	·	1.7 km	MPC · JPL
147775	2005 QS_{89}	—	August 24, 2005	Palomar	NEAT	·	3.3 km	MPC · JPL
147776	2005 QR_{100}	—	August 27, 2005	Palomar	NEAT	·	5.9 km	MPC · JPL
147777	2005 QV_{103}	—	August 27, 2005	Palomar	NEAT	SUL	3.5 km	MPC · JPL
147778	2005 QM_{104}	—	August 27, 2005	Palomar	NEAT	·	4.9 km	MPC · JPL
147779	2005 QK_{107}	—	August 27, 2005	Palomar	NEAT	·	7.0 km	MPC · JPL
147780	2005 QM_{107}	—	August 27, 2005	Palomar	NEAT	·	1.9 km	MPC · JPL
147781	2005 QB_{115}	—	August 27, 2005	Palomar	NEAT	·	3.8 km	MPC · JPL
147782	2005 QN_{118}	—	August 28, 2005	Kitt Peak	Spacewatch	·	4.1 km	MPC · JPL
147783	2005 QR_{123}	—	August 28, 2005	Kitt Peak	Spacewatch	·	4.0 km	MPC · JPL
147784	2005 QY_{135}	—	August 28, 2005	Kitt Peak	Spacewatch	MAS	1.1 km	MPC · JPL
147785	2005 QE_{146}	—	August 28, 2005	Anderson Mesa	LONEOS	EUN	2.5 km	MPC · JPL
147786	2005 QA_{149}	—	August 31, 2005	Socorro	LINEAR	·	4.2 km	MPC · JPL
147787	2005 QH_{157}	—	August 30, 2005	Palomar	NEAT	·	3.1 km	MPC · JPL
147788	2005 QE_{161}	—	August 28, 2005	Kitt Peak	Spacewatch	·	3.6 km	MPC · JPL
147789	2005 QZ_{161}	—	August 28, 2005	Siding Spring	SSS	·	2.9 km	MPC · JPL
147790	2005 QT_{169}	—	August 29, 2005	Palomar	NEAT	·	5.5 km	MPC · JPL
147791	2005 QF_{178}	—	August 25, 2005	Palomar	NEAT	KOR	2.0 km	MPC · JPL
147792	2005 RG_{1}	—	September 1, 2005	Palomar	NEAT	·	3.0 km	MPC · JPL
147793	2005 RK_{2}	—	September 2, 2005	Palomar	NEAT	slow	3.5 km	MPC · JPL
147794	2005 RO_{2}	—	September 2, 2005	Palomar	NEAT	·	5.8 km	MPC · JPL
147795	2005 RO_{7}	—	September 8, 2005	Socorro	LINEAR	·	3.3 km	MPC · JPL
147796	2005 RC_{13}	—	September 1, 2005	Kitt Peak	Spacewatch	·	2.0 km	MPC · JPL
147797	2005 RK_{16}	—	September 1, 2005	Kitt Peak	Spacewatch	KOR	1.7 km	MPC · JPL
147798	2005 RC_{21}	—	September 2, 2005	Haleakala	NEAT	·	3.0 km	MPC · JPL
147799	2005 RA_{34}	—	September 15, 2005	Wrightwood	J. W. Young	KOR	1.9 km	MPC · JPL
147800	2005 SR_{25}	—	September 27, 2005	Nashville	Clingan, R.	AST	4.7 km	MPC · JPL

== 147801–147900 ==
back to top

Designation			Discovery			Properties		Ref
Permanent	Provisional	Named after	Date	Site	Discoverer(s)	Category	Diam.	Ref
147801	2005 SR_{29}	—	September 23, 2005	Kitt Peak	Spacewatch	·	1.9 km	MPC · JPL
147802	2005 SS_{33}	—	September 23, 2005	Kitt Peak	Spacewatch	·	2.0 km	MPC · JPL
147803	2005 SQ_{52}	—	September 25, 2005	Kitt Peak	Spacewatch	THM	3.5 km	MPC · JPL
147804	2005 SJ_{55}	—	September 25, 2005	Kitt Peak	Spacewatch	·	6.4 km	MPC · JPL
147805	2005 SD_{68}	—	September 27, 2005	Kitt Peak	Spacewatch	·	2.3 km	MPC · JPL
147806	2005 SJ_{70}	—	September 28, 2005	Palomar	NEAT	·	2.6 km	MPC · JPL
147807	2005 SH_{72}	—	September 23, 2005	Catalina	CSS	THM	4.3 km	MPC · JPL
147808	2005 SX_{73}	—	September 23, 2005	Catalina	CSS	EOS	3.4 km	MPC · JPL
147809	2005 SC_{77}	—	September 24, 2005	Kitt Peak	Spacewatch	AST	2.1 km	MPC · JPL
147810	2005 SL_{82}	—	September 24, 2005	Kitt Peak	Spacewatch	·	2.7 km	MPC · JPL
147811	2005 SV_{94}	—	September 25, 2005	Palomar	NEAT	·	3.7 km	MPC · JPL
147812	2005 SM_{103}	—	September 25, 2005	Palomar	NEAT	·	4.0 km	MPC · JPL
147813	2005 SW_{106}	—	September 26, 2005	Catalina	CSS	EUN	2.1 km	MPC · JPL
147814	2005 SP_{107}	—	September 26, 2005	Catalina	CSS	·	4.6 km	MPC · JPL
147815	2005 SK_{118}	—	September 28, 2005	Palomar	NEAT	·	6.3 km	MPC · JPL
147816	2005 SU_{125}	—	September 29, 2005	Palomar	NEAT	·	3.5 km	MPC · JPL
147817	2005 SW_{127}	—	September 29, 2005	Mount Lemmon	Mount Lemmon Survey	THM	4.8 km	MPC · JPL
147818	2005 SZ_{138}	—	September 25, 2005	Kitt Peak	Spacewatch	·	3.2 km	MPC · JPL
147819	2005 SA_{140}	—	September 25, 2005	Kitt Peak	Spacewatch	·	2.4 km	MPC · JPL
147820	2005 SS_{166}	—	September 28, 2005	Palomar	NEAT	EOS	3.8 km	MPC · JPL
147821	2005 ST_{170}	—	September 29, 2005	Palomar	NEAT	·	5.8 km	MPC · JPL
147822	2005 SQ_{180}	—	September 29, 2005	Mount Lemmon	Mount Lemmon Survey	·	3.2 km	MPC · JPL
147823	2005 SO_{187}	—	September 29, 2005	Kitt Peak	Spacewatch	·	3.7 km	MPC · JPL
147824	2005 SC_{192}	—	September 29, 2005	Mount Lemmon	Mount Lemmon Survey	THM	4.0 km	MPC · JPL
147825	2005 SE_{206}	—	September 30, 2005	Anderson Mesa	LONEOS	·	5.4 km	MPC · JPL
147826	2005 SL_{208}	—	September 30, 2005	Kitt Peak	Spacewatch	·	6.5 km	MPC · JPL
147827	2005 SW_{219}	—	September 27, 2005	Socorro	LINEAR	·	3.7 km	MPC · JPL
147828	2005 SG_{239}	—	September 30, 2005	Kitt Peak	Spacewatch	THM	3.2 km	MPC · JPL
147829	2005 SM_{261}	—	September 22, 2005	Palomar	NEAT	·	3.9 km	MPC · JPL
147830	2005 SO_{269}	—	September 27, 2005	Socorro	LINEAR	·	4.8 km	MPC · JPL
147831	2005 TB_{17}	—	October 1, 2005	Socorro	LINEAR	·	2.4 km	MPC · JPL
147832	2005 TV_{26}	—	October 1, 2005	Mount Lemmon	Mount Lemmon Survey	·	3.3 km	MPC · JPL
147833	2005 TW_{49}	—	October 9, 2005	Great Shefford	Birtwhistle, P.	·	3.2 km	MPC · JPL
147834	2005 TZ_{54}	—	October 4, 2005	Palomar	NEAT	EOS	7.8 km	MPC · JPL
147835	2005 TU_{84}	—	October 3, 2005	Kitt Peak	Spacewatch	·	5.2 km	MPC · JPL
147836	2005 TN_{125}	—	October 7, 2005	Kitt Peak	Spacewatch	3:2 · SHU	8.5 km	MPC · JPL
147837	2005 TM_{144}	—	October 8, 2005	Kitt Peak	Spacewatch	·	2.6 km	MPC · JPL
147838	2005 TJ_{156}	—	October 9, 2005	Kitt Peak	Spacewatch	(5)	1.8 km	MPC · JPL
147839	2005 TQ_{167}	—	October 9, 2005	Kitt Peak	Spacewatch	·	2.6 km	MPC · JPL
147840	2005 TT_{167}	—	October 9, 2005	Kitt Peak	Spacewatch	ERI	1.9 km	MPC · JPL
147841	2005 TJ_{172}	—	October 11, 2005	Anderson Mesa	LONEOS	·	5.0 km	MPC · JPL
147842	2005 TU_{175}	—	October 3, 2005	Catalina	CSS	·	3.8 km	MPC · JPL
147843	2005 TN_{183}	—	October 7, 2005	Anderson Mesa	LONEOS	·	3.8 km	MPC · JPL
147844	2005 TG_{190}	—	October 1, 2005	Catalina	CSS	CYB	6.3 km	MPC · JPL
147845	2005 UY_{14}	—	October 22, 2005	Kitt Peak	Spacewatch	·	2.6 km	MPC · JPL
147846	2005 UO_{20}	—	October 22, 2005	Catalina	CSS	3:2	10 km	MPC · JPL
147847	2005 UA_{30}	—	October 23, 2005	Catalina	CSS	THM	3.9 km	MPC · JPL
147848	2005 UB_{68}	—	October 22, 2005	Palomar	NEAT	·	5.4 km	MPC · JPL
147849	2005 UG_{76}	—	October 24, 2005	Palomar	NEAT	(1118)	5.2 km	MPC · JPL
147850	2005 UP_{76}	—	October 24, 2005	Palomar	NEAT	·	4.2 km	MPC · JPL
147851	2005 UY_{76}	—	October 24, 2005	Palomar	NEAT	·	7.5 km	MPC · JPL
147852	2005 UA_{106}	—	October 22, 2005	Kitt Peak	Spacewatch	·	2.3 km	MPC · JPL
147853	2005 UT_{178}	—	October 24, 2005	Kitt Peak	Spacewatch	·	4.4 km	MPC · JPL
147854	2005 UF_{250}	—	October 23, 2005	Catalina	CSS	EUN	2.2 km	MPC · JPL
147855	2005 UO_{294}	—	October 26, 2005	Kitt Peak	Spacewatch	·	2.7 km	MPC · JPL
147856	2005 UH_{343}	—	October 31, 2005	Kitt Peak	Spacewatch	·	9.1 km	MPC · JPL
147857	2005 UW_{381}	—	October 24, 2005	Palomar	NEAT	·	7.0 km	MPC · JPL
147858	2005 UC_{385}	—	October 27, 2005	Catalina	CSS	(1101)	9.3 km	MPC · JPL
147859	2005 UF_{450}	—	October 31, 2005	Socorro	LINEAR	·	6.1 km	MPC · JPL
147860	2005 UA_{482}	—	October 22, 2005	Palomar	NEAT	·	2.5 km	MPC · JPL
147861	2005 UD_{492}	—	October 24, 2005	Palomar	NEAT	EOS	2.9 km	MPC · JPL
147862	2005 UP_{493}	—	October 25, 2005	Catalina	CSS	·	3.6 km	MPC · JPL
147863	2005 VD_{15}	—	November 1, 2005	Socorro	LINEAR	·	3.0 km	MPC · JPL
147864	2005 VQ_{34}	—	November 3, 2005	Catalina	CSS	·	2.9 km	MPC · JPL
147865	2005 VN_{39}	—	November 4, 2005	Mount Lemmon	Mount Lemmon Survey	HIL · 3:2	11 km	MPC · JPL
147866	2005 VG_{76}	—	November 3, 2005	Socorro	LINEAR	·	5.8 km	MPC · JPL
147867	2005 VF_{102}	—	November 1, 2005	Anderson Mesa	LONEOS	·	2.1 km	MPC · JPL
147868	2005 VW_{120}	—	November 11, 2005	Socorro	LINEAR	·	7.2 km	MPC · JPL
147869	2005 WG_{104}	—	November 28, 2005	Catalina	CSS	KOR	2.4 km	MPC · JPL
147870	2006 PG_{30}	—	August 6, 2006	Anderson Mesa	LONEOS	V	1.2 km	MPC · JPL
147871	2006 PH_{30}	—	August 6, 2006	Anderson Mesa	LONEOS	·	3.1 km	MPC · JPL
147872	2006 QT_{24}	—	August 17, 2006	Palomar	NEAT	DOR ·	4.4 km	MPC · JPL
147873	2006 QD_{27}	—	August 19, 2006	Palomar	NEAT	NYS	2.1 km	MPC · JPL
147874	2006 QP_{39}	—	August 19, 2006	Goodricke-Pigott	R. A. Tucker	·	2.1 km	MPC · JPL
147875	2006 QU_{55}	—	August 24, 2006	Socorro	LINEAR	EUN	2.2 km	MPC · JPL
147876	2006 QL_{58}	—	August 27, 2006	Goodricke-Pigott	R. A. Tucker	EUN	3.4 km	MPC · JPL
147877	2006 QT_{62}	—	August 23, 2006	Socorro	LINEAR	·	3.6 km	MPC · JPL
147878	2006 QY_{79}	—	August 24, 2006	Socorro	LINEAR	V	1.3 km	MPC · JPL
147879	2006 QQ_{113}	—	August 24, 2006	Palomar	NEAT	·	3.0 km	MPC · JPL
147880	2006 QV_{113}	—	August 24, 2006	Socorro	LINEAR	·	3.0 km	MPC · JPL
147881	2006 QZ_{117}	—	August 27, 2006	Anderson Mesa	LONEOS	AEO	1.9 km	MPC · JPL
147882	2006 QN_{166}	—	August 29, 2006	Anderson Mesa	LONEOS	·	5.8 km	MPC · JPL
147883	2006 RF_{6}	—	September 14, 2006	Catalina	CSS	MAS	1.0 km	MPC · JPL
147884	2006 RH_{6}	—	September 14, 2006	Catalina	CSS	ERI	2.3 km	MPC · JPL
147885	2006 RJ_{18}	—	September 14, 2006	Kitt Peak	Spacewatch	MAS	1.1 km	MPC · JPL
147886	2006 RJ_{19}	—	September 14, 2006	Kitt Peak	Spacewatch	V	1.1 km	MPC · JPL
147887	2006 RY_{26}	—	September 14, 2006	Catalina	CSS	V	1.1 km	MPC · JPL
147888	2006 RY_{30}	—	September 15, 2006	Socorro	LINEAR	·	1.7 km	MPC · JPL
147889	2006 RK_{31}	—	September 15, 2006	Kitt Peak	Spacewatch	·	3.2 km	MPC · JPL
147890	2006 RL_{31}	—	September 15, 2006	Kitt Peak	Spacewatch	·	1.2 km	MPC · JPL
147891	2006 RS_{48}	—	September 14, 2006	Kitt Peak	Spacewatch	·	2.2 km	MPC · JPL
147892	2006 RC_{60}	—	September 15, 2006	Kitt Peak	Spacewatch	·	1.6 km	MPC · JPL
147893	2006 SH	—	September 16, 2006	7300 Observatory	W. K. Y. Yeung	NYS	1.9 km	MPC · JPL
147894	2006 SO_{4}	—	September 16, 2006	Palomar	NEAT	MIS	3.3 km	MPC · JPL
147895	2006 ST_{4}	—	September 16, 2006	Catalina	CSS	·	1.7 km	MPC · JPL
147896	2006 SR_{5}	—	September 16, 2006	Palomar	NEAT	NYS	1.5 km	MPC · JPL
147897	2006 SF_{12}	—	September 16, 2006	Catalina	CSS	PHO	1.5 km	MPC · JPL
147898	2006 SH_{13}	—	September 17, 2006	Socorro	LINEAR	(12739)	3.0 km	MPC · JPL
147899	2006 SS_{18}	—	September 17, 2006	Kitt Peak	Spacewatch	·	1.2 km	MPC · JPL
147900	2006 SZ_{42}	—	September 18, 2006	Anderson Mesa	LONEOS	·	1.8 km	MPC · JPL

== 147901–148000 ==
back to top

Designation			Discovery			Properties		Ref
Permanent	Provisional	Named after	Date	Site	Discoverer(s)	Category	Diam.	Ref
147901	2006 SV_{48}	—	September 17, 2006	Anderson Mesa	LONEOS	·	2.3 km	MPC · JPL
147902	2006 SJ_{54}	—	September 17, 2006	Catalina	CSS	·	7.7 km	MPC · JPL
147903	2006 SE_{61}	—	September 19, 2006	Socorro	LINEAR	ERI	2.7 km	MPC · JPL
147904	2006 SG_{62}	—	September 18, 2006	Catalina	CSS	V	930 m	MPC · JPL
147905	2006 SV_{63}	—	September 18, 2006	Catalina	CSS	·	5.7 km	MPC · JPL
147906	2006 SB_{100}	—	September 18, 2006	Kitt Peak	Spacewatch	·	6.6 km	MPC · JPL
147907	2006 SG_{130}	—	September 19, 2006	Kitt Peak	Spacewatch	·	2.6 km	MPC · JPL
147908	2006 SV_{145}	—	September 19, 2006	Kitt Peak	Spacewatch	WIT	1.3 km	MPC · JPL
147909	2006 TV_{39}	—	October 12, 2006	Kitt Peak	Spacewatch	·	2.9 km	MPC · JPL
147910	2006 TY_{44}	—	October 12, 2006	Kitt Peak	Spacewatch	·	4.5 km	MPC · JPL
147911	2006 TF_{45}	—	October 12, 2006	Kitt Peak	Spacewatch	·	1.9 km	MPC · JPL
147912	2006 TD_{48}	—	October 12, 2006	Kitt Peak	Spacewatch	·	3.4 km	MPC · JPL
147913	2006 TB_{58}	—	October 15, 2006	Catalina	CSS	·	3.9 km	MPC · JPL
147914	2006 UE_{47}	—	October 16, 2006	Kitt Peak	Spacewatch	·	4.2 km	MPC · JPL
147915	2006 UA_{105}	—	October 18, 2006	Kitt Peak	Spacewatch	·	2.9 km	MPC · JPL
147916	2006 UX_{200}	—	October 21, 2006	Kitt Peak	Spacewatch	CYB	7.6 km	MPC · JPL
147917	2006 UT_{201}	—	October 21, 2006	Kitt Peak	Spacewatch	·	3.1 km	MPC · JPL
147918 Chiayi	2006 UU_{214}	Chiayi	October 25, 2006	Lulin Observatory	Q. Ye, Lin, H.-C.	·	1.3 km	MPC · JPL
147919	2006 UZ_{217}	—	October 30, 2006	Kitami	K. Endate	V	850 m	MPC · JPL
147920	2006 UK_{223}	—	October 18, 2006	Kitt Peak	Spacewatch	·	4.5 km	MPC · JPL
147921	2006 UY_{243}	—	October 27, 2006	Mount Lemmon	Mount Lemmon Survey	KOR	1.8 km	MPC · JPL
147922	2006 UD_{262}	—	October 28, 2006	Mount Lemmon	Mount Lemmon Survey	·	5.4 km	MPC · JPL
147923	2006 VK_{34}	—	November 11, 2006	Catalina	CSS	·	3.8 km	MPC · JPL
147924	2006 VM_{36}	—	November 11, 2006	Catalina	CSS	·	3.4 km	MPC · JPL
147925	2006 VU_{42}	—	November 12, 2006	Mount Lemmon	Mount Lemmon Survey	·	1.9 km	MPC · JPL
147926	2006 VJ_{94}	—	November 15, 2006	Catalina	CSS	·	4.0 km	MPC · JPL
147927	2006 VU_{129}	—	November 15, 2006	Kitt Peak	Spacewatch	THM	3.2 km	MPC · JPL
147928	2006 VW_{137}	—	November 15, 2006	Kitt Peak	Spacewatch	·	1.6 km	MPC · JPL
147929	2006 WE_{11}	—	November 16, 2006	Socorro	LINEAR	·	5.9 km	MPC · JPL
147930	2006 WD_{28}	—	November 22, 2006	7300 Observatory	W. K. Y. Yeung	·	3.4 km	MPC · JPL
147931	2006 WO_{102}	—	November 19, 2006	Kitt Peak	Spacewatch	·	2.8 km	MPC · JPL
147932	3043 P-L	—	September 24, 1960	Palomar	C. J. van Houten, I. van Houten-Groeneveld, T. Gehrels	·	1.3 km	MPC · JPL
147933	4744 P-L	—	September 24, 1960	Palomar	C. J. van Houten, I. van Houten-Groeneveld, T. Gehrels	·	1.1 km	MPC · JPL
147934	6302 P-L	—	September 24, 1960	Palomar	C. J. van Houten, I. van Houten-Groeneveld, T. Gehrels	MAS	990 m	MPC · JPL
147935	6620 P-L	—	September 24, 1960	Palomar	C. J. van Houten, I. van Houten-Groeneveld, T. Gehrels	·	3.6 km	MPC · JPL
147936	6728 P-L	—	September 24, 1960	Palomar	C. J. van Houten, I. van Houten-Groeneveld, T. Gehrels	·	1 km	MPC · JPL
147937	1038 T-2	—	September 29, 1973	Palomar	C. J. van Houten, I. van Houten-Groeneveld, T. Gehrels	·	950 m	MPC · JPL
147938	1119 T-2	—	September 29, 1973	Palomar	C. J. van Houten, I. van Houten-Groeneveld, T. Gehrels	·	1.3 km	MPC · JPL
147939	1413 T-2	—	September 30, 1973	Palomar	C. J. van Houten, I. van Houten-Groeneveld, T. Gehrels	NYS	1.2 km	MPC · JPL
147940	2203 T-2	—	September 29, 1973	Palomar	C. J. van Houten, I. van Houten-Groeneveld, T. Gehrels	·	1.8 km	MPC · JPL
147941	4134 T-2	—	September 29, 1973	Palomar	C. J. van Houten, I. van Houten-Groeneveld, T. Gehrels	MAS	1.1 km	MPC · JPL
147942	1058 T-3	—	October 17, 1977	Palomar	C. J. van Houten, I. van Houten-Groeneveld, T. Gehrels	·	5.0 km	MPC · JPL
147943	1209 T-3	—	October 17, 1977	Palomar	C. J. van Houten, I. van Houten-Groeneveld, T. Gehrels	V	990 m	MPC · JPL
147944	3448 T-3	—	October 16, 1977	Palomar	C. J. van Houten, I. van Houten-Groeneveld, T. Gehrels	·	1.8 km	MPC · JPL
147945	4021 T-3	—	October 16, 1977	Palomar	C. J. van Houten, I. van Houten-Groeneveld, T. Gehrels	·	1.6 km	MPC · JPL
147946	4084 T-3	—	October 16, 1977	Palomar	C. J. van Houten, I. van Houten-Groeneveld, T. Gehrels	·	1.3 km	MPC · JPL
147947	4187 T-3	—	October 16, 1977	Palomar	C. J. van Houten, I. van Houten-Groeneveld, T. Gehrels	(5)	2.7 km	MPC · JPL
147948	4211 T-3	—	October 16, 1977	Palomar	C. J. van Houten, I. van Houten-Groeneveld, T. Gehrels	VER	5.6 km	MPC · JPL
147949	4284 T-3	—	October 16, 1977	Palomar	C. J. van Houten, I. van Houten-Groeneveld, T. Gehrels	(5)	2.2 km	MPC · JPL
147950	4642 T-3	—	October 16, 1977	Palomar	C. J. van Houten, I. van Houten-Groeneveld, T. Gehrels	VER	5.8 km	MPC · JPL
147951	5156 T-3	—	October 16, 1977	Palomar	C. J. van Houten, I. van Houten-Groeneveld, T. Gehrels	·	5.9 km	MPC · JPL
147952	1984 BY_{3}	—	January 26, 1984	Palomar	B. A. Skiff	·	4.0 km	MPC · JPL
147953	1993 FB_{75}	—	March 21, 1993	La Silla	UESAC	·	1.8 km	MPC · JPL
147954	1993 RW_{14}	—	September 15, 1993	La Silla	E. W. Elst	·	1.9 km	MPC · JPL
147955	1993 TS_{10}	—	October 15, 1993	Kitt Peak	Spacewatch	·	4.2 km	MPC · JPL
147956	1993 TG_{11}	—	October 15, 1993	Kitt Peak	Spacewatch	·	1.9 km	MPC · JPL
147957	1993 TM_{21}	—	October 10, 1993	Palomar	H. E. Holt	·	3.1 km	MPC · JPL
147958	1993 TN_{25}	—	October 9, 1993	La Silla	E. W. Elst	·	1.3 km	MPC · JPL
147959	1993 TQ_{28}	—	October 9, 1993	La Silla	E. W. Elst	·	1.5 km	MPC · JPL
147960	1994 CM_{4}	—	February 10, 1994	Kitt Peak	Spacewatch	·	1.2 km	MPC · JPL
147961	1994 EU_{4}	—	March 5, 1994	Kitt Peak	Spacewatch	V	760 m	MPC · JPL
147962	1994 GD_{5}	—	April 6, 1994	Kitt Peak	Spacewatch	MAS	950 m	MPC · JPL
147963	1994 JC_{6}	—	May 4, 1994	Kitt Peak	Spacewatch	·	1.7 km	MPC · JPL
147964	1994 PP_{9}	—	August 10, 1994	La Silla	E. W. Elst	·	2.4 km	MPC · JPL
147965	1994 PV_{14}	—	August 10, 1994	La Silla	E. W. Elst	·	4.2 km	MPC · JPL
147966	1994 PK_{21}	—	August 12, 1994	La Silla	E. W. Elst	·	1.5 km	MPC · JPL
147967	1994 PW_{38}	—	August 10, 1994	La Silla	E. W. Elst	·	2.0 km	MPC · JPL
147968	1994 TZ_{7}	—	October 6, 1994	Kitt Peak	Spacewatch	·	4.9 km	MPC · JPL
147969	1994 TD_{8}	—	October 6, 1994	Kitt Peak	Spacewatch	·	1.3 km	MPC · JPL
147970	1994 UV_{3}	—	October 26, 1994	Kitt Peak	Spacewatch	NYS	1.6 km	MPC · JPL
147971 Nametoko	1994 WF	Nametoko	November 24, 1994	Kuma Kogen	A. Nakamura	HYG	4.6 km	MPC · JPL
147972	1995 ED_{2}	—	March 1, 1995	Kitt Peak	Spacewatch	·	1.3 km	MPC · JPL
147973	1995 FC_{2}	—	March 23, 1995	Kitt Peak	Spacewatch	·	1.5 km	MPC · JPL
147974	1995 HO_{3}	—	April 26, 1995	Kitt Peak	Spacewatch	·	1 km	MPC · JPL
147975	1995 QK_{12}	—	August 22, 1995	Kitt Peak	Spacewatch	·	3.0 km	MPC · JPL
147976	1995 SU_{27}	—	September 19, 1995	Kitt Peak	Spacewatch	·	3.3 km	MPC · JPL
147977	1995 SH_{30}	—	September 18, 1995	Kitt Peak	Spacewatch	·	2.8 km	MPC · JPL
147978	1995 SA_{34}	—	September 22, 1995	Kitt Peak	Spacewatch	·	3.1 km	MPC · JPL
147979	1995 SU_{41}	—	September 25, 1995	Kitt Peak	Spacewatch	·	2.6 km	MPC · JPL
147980	1995 SJ_{42}	—	September 25, 1995	Kitt Peak	Spacewatch	·	1.2 km	MPC · JPL
147981	1995 UP_{12}	—	October 17, 1995	Kitt Peak	Spacewatch	·	1.2 km	MPC · JPL
147982	1995 UC_{50}	—	October 17, 1995	Kitt Peak	Spacewatch	·	920 m	MPC · JPL
147983	1995 VL_{18}	—	November 15, 1995	Kitt Peak	Spacewatch	·	2.3 km	MPC · JPL
147984	1995 WO_{4}	—	November 20, 1995	Oizumi	T. Kobayashi	·	1.4 km	MPC · JPL
147985	1995 WS_{5}	—	November 23, 1995	Farra d'Isonzo	Farra d'Isonzo	·	1.5 km	MPC · JPL
147986	1995 WW_{16}	—	November 17, 1995	Kitt Peak	Spacewatch	·	1.4 km	MPC · JPL
147987	1995 WY_{17}	—	November 17, 1995	Kitt Peak	Spacewatch	·	2.2 km	MPC · JPL
147988	1995 YS_{1}	—	December 18, 1995	Kitt Peak	Spacewatch	·	660 m	MPC · JPL
147989	1995 YJ_{10}	—	December 18, 1995	Kitt Peak	Spacewatch	·	1.8 km	MPC · JPL
147990	1995 YX_{10}	—	December 18, 1995	Kitt Peak	Spacewatch	THB	4.1 km	MPC · JPL
147991	1996 AC_{11}	—	January 13, 1996	Kitt Peak	Spacewatch	NYS	1.4 km	MPC · JPL
147992	1996 BA_{11}	—	January 24, 1996	Kitt Peak	Spacewatch	·	5.9 km	MPC · JPL
147993	1996 FZ_{8}	—	March 19, 1996	Kitt Peak	Spacewatch	·	2.4 km	MPC · JPL
147994	1996 GF_{10}	—	April 13, 1996	Kitt Peak	Spacewatch	·	1.6 km	MPC · JPL
147995	1996 GX_{15}	—	April 13, 1996	Kitt Peak	Spacewatch	·	2.7 km	MPC · JPL
147996	1996 RD_{8}	—	September 6, 1996	Kitt Peak	Spacewatch	KOR	1.5 km	MPC · JPL
147997	1996 RH_{26}	—	September 14, 1996	Haleakala	NEAT	·	2.1 km	MPC · JPL
147998	1996 VC_{5}	—	November 12, 1996	Prescott	P. G. Comba	·	2.9 km	MPC · JPL
147999	1997 AC_{14}	—	January 2, 1997	Xinglong	SCAP	·	3.2 km	MPC · JPL
148000	1997 EB_{9}	—	March 2, 1997	Kitt Peak	Spacewatch	·	2.0 km	MPC · JPL

back to top

== See also ==
- Meanings of minor-planet names: 147001–148000
