= List of unnumbered trans-Neptunian objects: 2015 =

The following is a partial list of unnumbered trans-Neptunian objects for principal designations assigned within 2015. As of November 2026, it contains a total of 1086 bodies. For more information see the description on the main page. Also see list for the previous and next year.

== 2015 ==
Designation	First Observed (discovered)		D (km)	Orbital description						Remarks	Refs
Designation	Date	Observer (Site)	D (km)	Class	a (AU)	e	i (°)	q (AU)	Q (AU)	Remarks	Refs
2015 AB_{309}	14 January 2015	Pan-STARRS 1 (F51)	121	other TNO	40.1	0.24	24	30.5	49.7	albedo: 0.13	MPC; JPL
2015 AD_{298}	7 January 2015	DECam (W84)	116	centaur	455.9	0.96	47	18.8	893.0	albedo: 0.058	MPC; JPL
2015 AH_{281}	13 January 2015	Pan-STARRS 1 (F51)	440	centaur	37.8	0.40	10	22.6	53.1	albedo: 0.058	MPC; JPL
2015 AN_{304}	9 January 2015	DECam (W84)	97	SDO	132.5	0.70	32	39.4	225.7	albedo: 0.124	MPC; JPL
2015 AQ_{293}	12 January 2015	Pan-STARRS 1 (F51)	327	cubewano (hot)?	44.1	0.20	33	35.2	53.0	albedo: 0.079	MPC; JPL
2015 AR_{293}	14 January 2015	Pan-STARRS 1 (F51)	160	res · 5:12	54.2	0.35	24	35.5	72.9	albedo: 0.126	MPC; JPL
2015 AS_{293}	12 January 2015	DECam (W84)	196	SDO	51.6	0.36	34	33.0	70.1	albedo: 0.124	MPC; JPL
2015 BA_{643}	—	—	—	—	36.6	0.11	15	32.7	40.4	—	MPC; JPL
2015 BC_{519}	16 January 2015	Pan-STARRS 1 (F51)	163	res · 2:5	55.9	0.42	2	32.3	79.5	albedo: 0.126	MPC; JPL
2015 BC_{627}	16 January 2015	Subaru Telescope (T09)	116	cubewano (hot)?	41.3	0.13	19	36.1	46.5	albedo: 0.079	MPC; JPL
2015 BC_{630}	21 January 2015	Subaru Telescope (T09)	62	other TNO	41.2	0.14	34	35.6	46.9	albedo: 0.13	MPC; JPL
2015 BD_{630}	21 January 2015	Subaru Telescope (T09)	42	other TNO	51.2	0.33	29	34.5	68.0	albedo: 0.13	MPC; JPL
2015 BE_{568}	18 January 2015	Pan-STARRS 1 (F51)	81	centaur	75.6	0.74	24	19.6	131.7	albedo: 0.058	MPC; JPL
2015 BE_{627}	16 January 2015	Subaru Telescope (T09)	61	other TNO	53.5	0.30	23	37.5	69.5	albedo: 0.13	MPC; JPL
2015 BG_{568}	23 January 2015	Pan-STARRS 1 (F51)	175	SDO	84.3	0.56	37	37.4	131.3	albedo: 0.124	MPC; JPL
2015 BG_{647}	—	—	—	—	37.5	0.11	25.1	33.5	41.5	—	MPC; JPL
2015 BJ_{641}	21 January 2015	Subaru Telescope (T09)	—	—	55.1	0.36	22	35.6	74.7	—	MPC; JPL
2015 BK_{641}	21 January 2015	Subaru Telescope (T09)	—	—	45.8	0.15	14	39.1	52.5	—	MPC; JPL
2015 BL_{518}	20 January 2015	Pan-STARRS 1 (F51)	156	other TNO	45.9	0.26	15	33.8	58.0	albedo: 0.13	MPC; JPL
2015 BL_{641}	27 January 2015	Subaru Telescope (T09)	—	—	39.0	0.22	16	30.4	47.5	—	MPC; JPL
2015 BM_{641}	21 January 2015	Subaru Telescope (T09)	—	—	41.4	0.30	22	29.1	53.8	—	MPC; JPL
2015 BO_{641}	16 January 2015	Subaru Telescope (T09)	—	—	46.1	0.17	28	38.2	54.0	—	MPC; JPL
2015 BP_{641}	16 January 2015	Subaru Telescope (T09)	—	—	42.8	0.10	18	38.5	47.1	—	MPC; JPL
2015 BQ_{518}	24 January 2015	Pan-STARRS 1 (F51)	312	cubewano (hot)?	41.6	0.05	16	39.4	43.8	albedo: 0.079	MPC; JPL
2015 BQ_{626}	21 January 2015	Subaru Telescope (T09)	171	cubewano (hot)?	41.6	0.04	15	40.0	43.2	albedo: 0.079	MPC; JPL
2015 BQ_{646}	—	—	—	—	44.8	0.10	16	40.3	49.3	—	MPC; JPL
2015 BR_{626}	21 January 2015	Subaru Telescope (T09)	113	SDO	63.0	0.38	23	38.9	87.1	albedo: 0.124	MPC; JPL
2015 BR_{643}	—	—	—	—	82.2	0.56	21	36.5	127.8	—	MPC; JPL
2015 BR_{646}	—	—	—	—	39.0	0.10	17	35.0	43.0	—	MPC; JPL
2015 BS_{518}	28 January 2015	Pan-STARRS 1 (F51)	212	cubewano (hot)	41.9	0.11	29	37.4	46.5	albedo: 0.079	MPC; JPL
2015 BS_{646}	—	—	—	—	35.3	0.10	39	31.7	38.9	—	MPC; JPL
2015 BT_{646}	—	—	—	—	41.7	0.13	22	36.3	47.1	—	MPC; JPL
2015 BW_{629}	16 January 2015	Subaru Telescope (T09)	73	other TNO	45.7	0.18	20	37.5	53.8	albedo: 0.13	MPC; JPL
2015 BX_{641}	21 January 2015	Subaru Telescope (T09)	—	—	45.3	0.14	22	39.0	51.6	—	MPC; JPL
2015 BY_{518}	19 January 2015	Pan-STARRS 1 (F51)	193	twotino?	47.8	0.22	26	37.3	58.2	albedo: 0.126	MPC; JPL
2015 BZ_{517}	17 January 2015	Maunakea (568)	77	SDO	66.7	0.44	13	37.1	96.3	albedo: 0.124	MPC; JPL
2015 BZ_{621}	19 January 2015	Subaru Telescope (T09)	58	other TNO	45.8	0.20	17	36.8	54.8	albedo: 0.13	MPC; JPL
2015 DA_{225}	18 February 2015	M. W. Buie (695)	117	SDO	74.1	0.52	28	35.7	112.5	albedo: 0.124	MPC; JPL
2015 DA_{249}	17 February 2015	DECam (W84)	98	res · 3:5	42.5	0.30	20	29.9	55.1	albedo: 0.126	MPC; JPL
2015 DA_{250}	17 February 2015	DECam (W84)	135	SDO	67.1	0.46	27	36.6	97.6	albedo: 0.124	MPC; JPL
2015 DB_{225}	18 February 2015	Kitt Peak (695)	108	cubewano (cold)?	44.2	0.01	3	43.6	44.9	albedo: 0.152	MPC; JPL
2015 DB_{249}	17 February 2015	DECam (W84)	159	cubewano (hot)?	45.4	0.19	24	37.0	53.9	albedo: 0.079	MPC; JPL
2015 DB_{250}	17 February 2015	DECam (W84)	143	cubewano (hot)?	47.1	0.21	11	37.2	57.0	albedo: 0.079	MPC; JPL
2015 DC_{225}	18 February 2015	M. W. Buie (695)	130	cubewano (hot)?	42.9	0.18	9	35.2	50.5	albedo: 0.079	MPC; JPL
2015 DC_{249}	17 February 2015	DECam (W84)	175	cubewano (hot)	41.7	0.09	21	37.9	45.6	albedo: 0.079	MPC; JPL
2015 DD_{249}	17 February 2015	DECam (W84)	160	SDO	89.3	0.52	19	43.3	135.3	albedo: 0.124	MPC; JPL
2015 DF_{249}	17 February 2015	DECam (W84)	147	cubewano (hot)?	40.9	0.02	13	40.2	41.6	albedo: 0.079	MPC; JPL
2015 DG_{249}	17 February 2015	DECam (W84)	164	cubewano (hot)?	43.5	0.06	16	40.9	46.1	albedo: 0.079	MPC; JPL
2015 DH_{249}	17 February 2015	DECam (W84)	143	cubewano (hot)?	44.3	0.07	22	41.2	47.5	albedo: 0.079	MPC; JPL
2015 DK_{249}	17 February 2015	DECam (W84)	120	SDO	423.2	0.93	7	28.1	818.4	albedo: 0.124	MPC; JPL
2015 DL_{249}	17 February 2015	DECam (W84)	86	cubewano (hot)?	41.2	0.19	14	33.5	48.9	albedo: 0.079	MPC; JPL
2015 DM_{249}	17 February 2015	DECam (W84)	122	SDO	55.9	0.33	12	37.6	74.1	albedo: 0.124	MPC; JPL
2015 DM_{319}	25 February 2015	Subaru Telescope (T14)	66	ESDO	278.6	0.86	7	39.4	517.9	albedo: 0.124	MPC; JPL
2015 DN_{249}	17 February 2015	DECam (W84)	103	cubewano (hot)?	41.6	0.11	16	37.1	46.1	albedo: 0.079	MPC; JPL
2015 DO_{248}	17 February 2015	DECam (W84)	130	cubewano (hot)?	41.8	0.16	23	35.1	48.5	albedo: 0.079	MPC; JPL
2015 DO_{249}	17 February 2015	DECam (W84)	94	cubewano (hot)?	42.3	0.17	21	35.1	49.6	albedo: 0.079	MPC; JPL
2015 DP_{248}	17 February 2015	DECam (W84)	172	cubewano (hot)?	42.2	0.09	20	38.5	46.0	albedo: 0.079	MPC; JPL
2015 DP_{249}	17 February 2015	DECam (W84)	102	other TNO	45.1	0.10	17	40.8	49.4	albedo: 0.13	MPC; JPL
2015 DQ_{248}	17 February 2015	DECam (W84)	78	SDO	68.6	0.49	32	35.1	102.2	albedo: 0.124	MPC; JPL
2015 DR_{248}	17 February 2015	DECam (W84)	143	cubewano (hot)?	42.1	0.20	16	33.6	50.6	albedo: 0.079	MPC; JPL
2015 DR_{249}	17 February 2015	DECam (W84)	110	SDO	92.6	0.61	28	36.4	148.8	albedo: 0.124	MPC; JPL
2015 DR_{370}	17 February 2015	DECam (W84)	—	—	416.0	0.90	16	40.2	791.7	—	MPC; JPL
2015 DS_{248}	17 February 2015	DECam (W84)	102	other TNO	40.9	0.11	20	36.3	45.5	albedo: 0.13	MPC; JPL
2015 DS_{249}	17 February 2015	DECam (W84)	89	centaur	59.4	0.70	11	17.9	100.8	albedo: 0.058	MPC; JPL
2015 DT_{249}	17 February 2015	DECam (W84)	157	cubewano (hot)?	41.4	0.06	26	38.9	43.9	albedo: 0.079	MPC; JPL
2015 DU_{248}	17 February 2015	DECam (W84)	170	cubewano (hot)?	43.7	0.04	14	42.1	45.2	albedo: 0.079	MPC; JPL
2015 DU_{249}	17 February 2015	DECam (W84)	352	SDO	54.7	0.35	19	35.6	73.8	albedo: 0.124	MPC; JPL
2015 DV_{248}	17 February 2015	DECam (W84)	143	cubewano (hot)?	45.5	0.15	20	38.8	52.2	albedo: 0.079	MPC; JPL
2015 DV_{249}	17 February 2015	DECam (W84)	139	SDO	53.0	0.32	12	36.2	69.7	albedo: 0.124	MPC; JPL
2015 DW_{249}	17 February 2015	DECam (W84)	135	cubewano (hot)?	45.1	0.21	15	35.4	54.7	albedo: 0.079	MPC; JPL
2015 DX_{249}	17 February 2015	DECam (W84)	144	res · 3:11	72.2	0.52	26	34.5	109.9	albedo: 0.126	MPC; JPL
2015 DY_{248}	17 February 2015	DECam (W84)	82	SDO	324.4	0.90	13	33.9	614.9	albedo: 0.124	MPC; JPL
2015 DY_{249}	17 February 2015	DECam (W84)	99	cubewano (hot)?	41.0	0.14	25	35.4	46.6	albedo: 0.079	MPC; JPL
2015 DZ_{248}	17 February 2015	DECam (W84)	133	SDO	74.4	0.51	18	36.5	112.4	albedo: 0.124	MPC; JPL
2015 DZ_{249}	17 February 2015	DECam (W84)	130	cubewano (hot)?	41.5	0.04	14	40.1	43.0	albedo: 0.079	MPC; JPL
2015 DZ_{250}	19 February 2015	Pan-STARRS 1 (F51)	357	cubewano (hot)	42.7	0.14	22	36.8	48.7	albedo: 0.079	MPC; JPL
2015 FA_{400}	18 March 2015	Maunakea (568)	56	ESDO	317.0	0.89	25	35.6	598.4	albedo: 0.124	MPC; JPL
2015 FA_{432}	17 March 2015	Maunakea (568)	161	twotino	47.8	0.11	7	42.8	52.9	albedo: 0.126	MPC; JPL
2015 FA_{490}	20 March 2015	Subaru Telescope (T09)	67	SDO	84.3	0.60	21	34.0	134.6	albedo: 0.124	MPC; JPL
2015 FA_{491}	18 March 2015	Subaru Telescope (T09)	52	other TNO	40.7	0.10	1	36.5	45.0	albedo: 0.13	MPC; JPL
2015 FA_{559}	18 March 2015	Subaru Telescope (T09)	74	other TNO	44.7	0.24	20	33.8	55.5	albedo: 0.13	MPC; JPL
2015 FA_{562}	18 March 2015	Subaru Telescope (T09)	65	other TNO	33.0	0.10	2	29.6	36.4	albedo: 0.13	MPC; JPL
2015 FA_{563}	18 March 2015	Subaru Telescope (T09)	50	other TNO	68.0	0.39	3	41.8	94.2	albedo: 0.13	MPC; JPL
2015 FA_{564}	18 March 2015	Subaru Telescope (T09)	32	other TNO	55.3	0.29	2	39.2	71.4	albedo: 0.13	MPC; JPL
2015 FB_{400}	18 March 2015	Maunakea (568)	139	centaur	35.4	0.85	3	5.4	65.3	albedo: 0.058	MPC; JPL
2015 FB_{490}	20 March 2015	Subaru Telescope (T09)	99	cubewano (cold)?	43.4	0.02	0	42.7	44.2	albedo: 0.152	MPC; JPL
2015 FB_{495}	18 March 2015	Subaru Telescope (T09)	74	cubewano (hot)?	40.8	0.11	9	36.4	45.3	albedo: 0.079	MPC; JPL
2015 FB_{562}	20 March 2015	Subaru Telescope (T09)	82	cubewano (hot)?	49.3	0.19	16	40.1	58.6	albedo: 0.079	MPC; JPL
2015 FB_{563}	18 March 2015	Subaru Telescope (T09)	51	other TNO	59.1	0.31	0	40.6	77.6	albedo: 0.13	MPC; JPL
2015 FB_{564}	18 March 2015	Subaru Telescope (T09)	36	other TNO	55.9	0.28	3	40.5	71.3	albedo: 0.13	MPC; JPL
2015 FC_{400}	18 March 2015	Maunakea (568)	94	centaur	66.8	0.63	2	25.0	108.6	albedo: 0.058	MPC; JPL
2015 FC_{475}	23 March 2015	Kitt Peak (695)	152	cubewano (cold)?	42.7	0.07	2	39.7	45.8	albedo: 0.152	MPC; JPL
2015 FC_{490}	20 March 2015	Subaru Telescope (T09)	98	SDO	79.9	0.43	1	45.6	114.3	albedo: 0.124	MPC; JPL
2015 FC_{493}	25 March 2015	Subaru Telescope (T09)	128	centaur	676.2	0.99	12	6.9	1345.5	albedo: 0.058	MPC; JPL
2015 FC_{562}	18 March 2015	Subaru Telescope (T09)	103	cubewano (hot)?	48.5	0.17	11	40.2	56.8	albedo: 0.079	MPC; JPL
2015 FC_{563}	20 March 2015	Subaru Telescope (T09)	47	SDO	114.2	0.64	1	41.0	187.4	albedo: 0.124	MPC; JPL
2015 FC_{564}	18 March 2015	Subaru Telescope (T09)	72	other TNO	49.9	0.10	3	45.0	54.8	albedo: 0.13	MPC; JPL
2015 FC_{565}	18 March 2015	Subaru Telescope (T09)	38	SDO	64.7	0.50	15	32.6	96.9	albedo: 0.124	MPC; JPL
2015 FC_{574}	—	—	—	—	78.3	0.47	35	41.5	115.2	—	MPC; JPL
2015 FD_{399}	18 March 2015	Maunakea (568)	100	cubewano (cold)?	44.0	0.04	1	42.2	45.8	albedo: 0.152	MPC; JPL
2015 FD_{400}	18 March 2015	Maunakea (568)	72	other TNO	74.0	0.39	3	45.1	103.0	albedo: 0.13	MPC; JPL
2015 FD_{502}	18 March 2015	Subaru Telescope (T09)	63	other TNO	40.6	0.13	17	35.4	45.8	albedo: 0.13	MPC; JPL
2015 FD_{562}	18 March 2015	Subaru Telescope (T09)	46	cubewano (hot)?	41.0	0.11	10	36.7	45.4	albedo: 0.079	MPC; JPL
2015 FD_{563}	18 March 2015	Subaru Telescope (T09)	60	cubewano (cold)?	45.7	0.10	2	41.2	50.2	albedo: 0.152	MPC; JPL
2015 FD_{564}	18 March 2015	Subaru Telescope (T09)	102	cubewano (hot)?	43.9	0.17	7	36.5	51.2	albedo: 0.079	MPC; JPL
2015 FD_{566}	20 March 2015	Subaru Telescope (T09)	38	cubewano (cold)?	44.0	0.10	2	39.6	48.3	albedo: 0.152	MPC; JPL
2015 FE_{398}	18 March 2015	Maunakea (568)	45	other TNO	36.1	0.10	7	32.4	39.8	albedo: 0.13	MPC; JPL
2015 FE_{399}	18 March 2015	Maunakea (568)	94	other TNO	76.2	0.44	1	43.1	109.3	albedo: 0.13	MPC; JPL
2015 FE_{401}	20 March 2015	Maunakea (568)	60	other TNO	76.4	0.45	2	42.1	110.8	albedo: 0.13	MPC; JPL
2015 FE_{490}	20 March 2015	Subaru Telescope (T09)	191	centaur	57.9	0.58	16	24.5	91.4	albedo: 0.058	MPC; JPL
2015 FE_{495}	20 March 2015	Subaru Telescope (T09)	81	SDO	115.1	0.64	2	42.0	188.1	albedo: 0.124	MPC; JPL
2015 FE_{562}	18 March 2015	Subaru Telescope (T09)	82	cubewano (hot)?	46.4	0.21	12	36.6	56.2	albedo: 0.079	MPC; JPL
2015 FE_{563}	18 March 2015	Subaru Telescope (T09)	64	other TNO	63.7	0.29	2	45.4	82.1	albedo: 0.13	MPC; JPL
2015 FE_{564}	18 March 2015	Subaru Telescope (T09)	71	cubewano (cold)?	46.9	0.10	2	42.2	51.5	albedo: 0.152	MPC; JPL
2015 FF_{490}	18 March 2015	Subaru Telescope (T09)	102	other TNO	37.8	0.15	9	32.1	43.5	albedo: 0.13	MPC; JPL
2015 FF_{495}	20 March 2015	Subaru Telescope (T09)	128	other TNO	50.2	0.10	28	45.3	55.1	albedo: 0.13	MPC; JPL
2015 FF_{496}	18 March 2015	Subaru Telescope (T09)	71	SDO	111.1	0.64	5	39.9	182.2	albedo: 0.124	MPC; JPL
2015 FF_{504}	29 March 2015	Subaru Telescope (T09)	132	centaur	2864.9	0.99	16	20.9	5708.9	albedo: 0.058	MPC; JPL
2015 FF_{563}	18 March 2015	Subaru Telescope (T09)	47	cubewano (cold)?	41.9	0.10	3	37.5	46.2	albedo: 0.152	MPC; JPL
2015 FF_{564}	20 March 2015	Subaru Telescope (T09)	39	SDO	89.2	0.62	28	33.7	144.7	albedo: 0.124	MPC; JPL
2015 FF_{565}	18 March 2015	Subaru Telescope (T09)	91	SDO	129.1	0.58	176	54.8	203.5	albedo: 0.124	MPC; JPL
2015 FF_{566}	20 March 2015	Subaru Telescope (T09)	68	other TNO	43.4	0.17	6	36.0	50.8	albedo: 0.13	MPC; JPL
2015 FG_{399}	18 March 2015	Maunakea (568)	57	other TNO	62.7	0.62	8	24.2	101.2	albedo: 0.13	MPC; JPL
2015 FG_{415}	17 March 2015	Maunakea (568)	238	SDO	64.4	0.43	5	36.9	91.9	albedo: 0.124	MPC; JPL
2015 FG_{490}	20 March 2015	Subaru Telescope (T09)	121	cubewano (cold)?	45.1	0.10	1	40.6	49.5	albedo: 0.152	MPC; JPL
2015 FG_{496}	18 March 2015	Subaru Telescope (T09)	47	other TNO	55.4	0.20	1	44.6	66.2	albedo: 0.13	MPC; JPL
2015 FG_{504}	20 March 2015	Subaru Telescope (T09)	85	other TNO	37.4	0.11	20	33.4	41.3	albedo: 0.13	MPC; JPL
2015 FG_{561}	29 March 2015	Subaru Telescope (T09)	80	res · 2:5	55.3	0.36	25	35.4	75.1	albedo: 0.126	MPC; JPL
2015 FG_{563}	20 March 2015	Subaru Telescope (T09)	52	other TNO	63.5	0.37	20	40.4	86.7	albedo: 0.13	MPC; JPL
2015 FG_{564}	18 March 2015	Subaru Telescope (T09)	43	SDO	114.3	0.67	1	38.2	190.5	albedo: 0.124	MPC; JPL
2015 FG_{565}	18 March 2015	Subaru Telescope (T09)	35	other TNO	39.0	0.10	6	35.0	43.0	albedo: 0.13	MPC; JPL
2015 FH_{400}	18 March 2015	Maunakea (568)	122	SDO	77.8	0.50	1	39.3	116.4	albedo: 0.124	MPC; JPL
2015 FH_{401}	20 March 2015	Maunakea (568)	76	other TNO	74.2	0.47	1	39.3	109.1	albedo: 0.13	MPC; JPL
2015 FH_{490}	18 March 2015	Subaru Telescope (T09)	138	other TNO	36.7	0.11	5	32.7	40.6	albedo: 0.13	MPC; JPL
2015 FH_{496}	18 March 2015	Subaru Telescope (T09)	38	SDO	67.8	0.47	8	36.1	99.4	albedo: 0.124	MPC; JPL
2015 FH_{561}	18 March 2015	Subaru Telescope (T09)	82	other TNO	45.5	0.24	19	34.8	56.3	albedo: 0.13	MPC; JPL
2015 FH_{562}	20 March 2015	Subaru Telescope (T09)	50	cubewano (hot)?	39.8	0.13	25	34.8	44.9	albedo: 0.079	MPC; JPL
2015 FH_{564}	25 March 2015	Subaru Telescope (T09)	53	other TNO	61.3	0.30	4	42.6	79.9	albedo: 0.13	MPC; JPL
2015 FH_{565}	18 March 2015	Subaru Telescope (T09)	62	other TNO	39.1	0.11	2	35.0	43.2	albedo: 0.13	MPC; JPL
2015 FH_{566}	18 March 2015	Subaru Telescope (T09)	44	other TNO	48.4	0.10	0	43.8	53.1	albedo: 0.13	MPC; JPL
2015 FJ345	17 March 2015	S. S. Sheppard, C. A. Trujillo (568)	99	SDO	63.0	0.21	35	50.1	75.9	albedo: 0.124	MPC; JPL
2015 FJ_{401}	20 March 2015	Maunakea (568)	93	SDO	81.1	0.49	1	41.6	120.5	albedo: 0.124	MPC; JPL
2015 FJ_{490}	20 March 2015	Subaru Telescope (T09)	68	centaur	37.6	0.44	13	20.9	54.2	albedo: 0.058	MPC; JPL
2015 FJ_{496}	18 March 2015	Subaru Telescope (T09)	67	cubewano (cold)?	44.0	0.10	4	39.5	48.4	albedo: 0.152	MPC; JPL
2015 FJ_{561}	22 March 2015	Subaru Telescope (T09)	102	other TNO	42.0	0.30	18	29.4	54.6	albedo: 0.13	MPC; JPL
2015 FJ_{562}	18 March 2015	Subaru Telescope (T09)	123	centaur	32.6	0.36	4	20.8	44.5	albedo: 0.058	MPC; JPL
2015 FJ_{563}	18 March 2015	Subaru Telescope (T09)	122	cubewano (hot)?	41.1	0.02	26	40.1	42.0	albedo: 0.079	MPC; JPL
2015 FJ_{564}	18 March 2015	Subaru Telescope (T09)	66	other TNO	40.7	0.11	1	36.3	45.1	albedo: 0.13	MPC; JPL
2015 FJ_{565}	18 March 2015	Subaru Telescope (T09)	45	cubewano (cold)?	41.2	0.10	2	37.0	45.4	albedo: 0.152	MPC; JPL
2015 FK_{37}	20 March 2015	Pan-STARRS 1 (F51)	8	damocloid	375.7	0.99	156	4.9	746.5	albedo: 0.048	MPC; JPL
2015 FK_{401}	20 March 2015	Maunakea (568)	135	SDO	59.4	0.52	8	28.7	90.1	albedo: 0.124	MPC; JPL
2015 FK_{490}	18 March 2015	Subaru Telescope (T09)	67	SDO	126.2	0.71	2	36.5	215.9	albedo: 0.124	MPC; JPL
2015 FK_{495}	18 March 2015	Subaru Telescope (T09)	57	SDO	61.8	0.39	13	37.9	85.7	albedo: 0.124	MPC; JPL
2015 FK_{496}	20 March 2015	Subaru Telescope (T09)	46	other TNO	54.4	0.21	1	43.0	65.7	albedo: 0.13	MPC; JPL
2015 FK_{562}	18 March 2015	Subaru Telescope (T09)	105	cubewano (cold)?	46.4	0.10	2	41.7	51.1	albedo: 0.152	MPC; JPL
2015 FK_{564}	18 March 2015	Subaru Telescope (T09)	79	cubewano (hot)?	46.5	0.13	25	40.6	52.3	albedo: 0.079	MPC; JPL
2015 FK_{565}	18 March 2015	Subaru Telescope (T09)	60	cubewano (cold)?	41.7	0.10	1	37.4	46.1	albedo: 0.152	MPC; JPL
2015 FL_{399}	18 March 2015	Maunakea (568)	109	cubewano (hot)?	45.5	0.10	27	40.8	50.3	albedo: 0.079	MPC; JPL
2015 FL_{400}	18 March 2015	Maunakea (568)	151	centaur	65.9	0.62	4	25.3	106.6	albedo: 0.058	MPC; JPL
2015 FL_{496}	20 March 2015	Subaru Telescope (T09)	112	cubewano (cold)?	43.2	0.10	2	38.9	47.6	albedo: 0.152	MPC; JPL
2015 FL_{562}	18 March 2015	Subaru Telescope (T09)	76	other TNO	59.1	0.28	2	42.3	76.0	albedo: 0.13	MPC; JPL
2015 FL_{563}	20 March 2015	Subaru Telescope (T09)	212	centaur	35.6	0.17	10	29.5	41.8	albedo: 0.058	MPC; JPL
2015 FM_{485}	22 March 2015	Subaru Telescope (T09)	101	other TNO	45.2	0.18	15	37.3	53.2	albedo: 0.13	MPC; JPL
2015 FM_{490}	20 March 2015	Subaru Telescope (T09)	56	cubewano (hot)?	41.4	0.10	25	37.3	45.5	albedo: 0.079	MPC; JPL
2015 FM_{499}	20 March 2015	Subaru Telescope (T09)	39	other TNO	54.2	0.22	8	42.5	65.8	albedo: 0.13	MPC; JPL
2015 FM_{563}	25 March 2015	Subaru Telescope (T09)	82	cubewano (cold)?	49.3	0.10	4	44.5	54.1	albedo: 0.152	MPC; JPL
2015 FN_{398}	18 March 2015	Maunakea (568)	90	centaur	81.9	0.50	1	40.8	123.0	albedo: 0.058	MPC; JPL
2015 FN_{400}	18 March 2015	Maunakea (568)	77	other TNO	36.3	0.10	5	32.6	40.1	albedo: 0.13	MPC; JPL
2015 FN_{485}	22 March 2015	Subaru Telescope (T09)	63	SDO	53.8	0.34	28	35.4	72.1	albedo: 0.124	MPC; JPL
2015 FN_{490}	18 March 2015	Subaru Telescope (T09)	29	SDO	60.6	0.40	25	36.4	84.8	albedo: 0.124	MPC; JPL
2015 FN_{494}	18 March 2015	Subaru Telescope (T09)	78	SDO	113.1	0.66	32	38.2	188.0	albedo: 0.124	MPC; JPL
2015 FN_{496}	18 March 2015	Subaru Telescope (T09)	68	other TNO	51.8	0.35	35	33.8	69.8	albedo: 0.13	MPC; JPL
2015 FN_{562}	18 March 2015	Subaru Telescope (T09)	99	cubewano (cold)?	44.8	0.10	3	40.2	49.4	albedo: 0.152	MPC; JPL
2015 FN_{563}	18 March 2015	Subaru Telescope (T09)	56	SDO	84.1	0.46	3	45.5	122.8	albedo: 0.124	MPC; JPL
2015 FN_{565}	18 March 2015	Subaru Telescope (T09)	81	other TNO	50.1	0.10	1	45.1	55.1	albedo: 0.13	MPC; JPL
2015 FO_{400}	18 March 2015	Maunakea (568)	64	res · 5:9	45.1	0.14	3	38.9	51.2	albedo: 0.126	MPC; JPL
2015 FO_{477}	23 March 2015	Kitt Peak (695)	120	cubewano (hot)?	45.4	0.18	8	37.2	53.6	albedo: 0.079	MPC; JPL
2015 FO_{490}	20 March 2015	Subaru Telescope (T09)	75	SDO	126.5	0.68	10	40.4	212.6	albedo: 0.124	MPC; JPL
2015 FO_{562}	18 March 2015	Subaru Telescope (T09)	90	cubewano (cold)?	42.0	0.10	2	37.7	46.2	albedo: 0.152	MPC; JPL
2015 FO_{563}	20 March 2015	Subaru Telescope (T09)	52	cubewano (cold)?	49.2	0.10	1	44.5	53.9	albedo: 0.152	MPC; JPL
2015 FO_{565}	18 March 2015	Subaru Telescope (T09)	45	other TNO	73.4	0.44	2	41.0	105.8	albedo: 0.13	MPC; JPL
2015 FP_{398}	18 March 2015	Maunakea (568)	155	other TNO	71.3	0.38	4	44.2	98.4	albedo: 0.13	MPC; JPL
2015 FP_{399}	18 March 2015	Maunakea (568)	84	cubewano (cold)?	49.5	0.10	3	44.7	54.3	albedo: 0.152	MPC; JPL
2015 FP_{401}	22 March 2015	Maunakea (568)	99	cubewano (hot)?	41.7	0.09	24	38.1	45.3	albedo: 0.079	MPC; JPL
2015 FP_{486}	18 March 2015	Subaru Telescope (T09)	83	cubewano (cold)?	49.3	0.10	1	44.4	54.1	albedo: 0.152	MPC; JPL
2015 FP_{490}	20 March 2015	Subaru Telescope (T09)	72	other TNO	51.0	0.10	1	46.0	56.0	albedo: 0.13	MPC; JPL
2015 FP_{495}	20 March 2015	Subaru Telescope (T09)	77	other TNO	51.1	0.37	6	32.1	70.2	albedo: 0.13	MPC; JPL
2015 FP_{561}	25 March 2015	Subaru Telescope (T09)	114	centaur	177.2	0.86	58	24.4	329.9	albedo: 0.058	MPC; JPL
2015 FP_{562}	20 March 2015	Subaru Telescope (T09)	77	cubewano (cold)?	48.3	0.10	2	43.3	53.3	albedo: 0.152	MPC; JPL
2015 FP_{563}	20 March 2015	Subaru Telescope (T09)	45	SDO	88.2	0.53	11	41.6	134.9	albedo: 0.124	MPC; JPL
2015 FP_{565}	20 March 2015	Subaru Telescope (T09)	44	cubewano (cold)?	45.4	0.10	1	40.9	49.8	albedo: 0.152	MPC; JPL
2015 FQ_{398}	18 March 2015	Maunakea (568)	75	other TNO	76.1	0.33	7	50.8	101.3	albedo: 0.13	MPC; JPL
2015 FQ_{400}	18 March 2015	Maunakea (568)	—	—	39.3	0.23	17	30.4	48.1	—	MPC; JPL
2015 FQ_{401}	22 March 2015	Maunakea (568)	91	SDO	84.4	0.37	17	53.5	115.4	albedo: 0.124	MPC; JPL
2015 FQ_{486}	18 March 2015	Subaru Telescope (T09)	93	SDO	88.9	0.66	8	30.2	147.7	albedo: 0.124	MPC; JPL
2015 FQ_{490}	18 March 2015	Subaru Telescope (T09)	126	twotino	47.1	0.31	15	32.5	61.7	albedo: 0.126	MPC; JPL
2015 FQ_{493}	18 March 2015	Subaru Telescope (T09)	55	other TNO	52.4	0.33	24	35.0	69.8	albedo: 0.13	MPC; JPL
2015 FQ_{561}	20 March 2015	Subaru Telescope (T09)	68	SDO	523.5	0.93	2	35.5	1011.4	albedo: 0.124	MPC; JPL
2015 FQ_{562}	18 March 2015	Subaru Telescope (T09)	48	SDO	123.9	0.66	1	42.0	205.9	albedo: 0.124	MPC; JPL
2015 FQ_{563}	20 March 2015	Subaru Telescope (T09)	106	other TNO	55.0	0.10	21	49.3	60.8	albedo: 0.13	MPC; JPL
2015 FQ_{565}	20 March 2015	Subaru Telescope (T09)	39	other TNO	58.0	0.27	6	42.3	73.7	albedo: 0.13	MPC; JPL
2015 FR_{345}	17 March 2015	Maunakea (568)	191	plutino	39.4	0.14	14	33.9	44.8	albedo: 0.074	MPC; JPL
2015 FR_{399}	18 March 2015	Maunakea (568)	123	cubewano (cold)?	44.6	0.11	2	39.9	49.3	albedo: 0.152	MPC; JPL
2015 FR_{486}	18 March 2015	Subaru Telescope (T09)	112	centaur	90.2	0.69	3	27.9	152.5	albedo: 0.058	MPC; JPL
2015 FR_{490}	20 March 2015	Subaru Telescope (T09)	40	SDO	90.2	0.59	17	37.2	143.3	albedo: 0.124	MPC; JPL
2015 FR_{495}	20 March 2015	Subaru Telescope (T09)	102	other TNO	53.8	0.19	1	43.3	64.3	albedo: 0.13	MPC; JPL
2015 FR_{561}	18 March 2015	Subaru Telescope (T09)	186	centaur	46.1	0.65	174	16.2	75.9	albedo: 0.058	MPC; JPL
2015 FR_{562}	20 March 2015	Subaru Telescope (T09)	102	cubewano (hot)?	48.9	0.10	8	44.0	53.8	albedo: 0.079	MPC; JPL
2015 FR_{563}	20 March 2015	Subaru Telescope (T09)	100	other TNO	53.4	0.10	37	47.9	58.9	albedo: 0.13	MPC; JPL
2015 FR_{574}	—	—	—	—	32.2	0.10	6	28.8	35.5	—	MPC; JPL
2015 FS_{345}	17 March 2015	Maunakea (568)	133	cubewano (cold)	46.7	0.13	4	40.8	52.7	albedo: 0.152	MPC; JPL
2015 FS_{401}	22 March 2015	Maunakea (568)	128	SDO	47.1	0.09	26	43.0	51.1	albedo: 0.124	MPC; JPL
2015 FS_{486}	18 March 2015	Subaru Telescope (T09)	157	cubewano (cold)?	44.9	0.08	5	41.3	48.5	albedo: 0.152	MPC; JPL
2015 FS_{490}	18 March 2015	Subaru Telescope (T09)	115	centaur	206.1	0.88	11	24.7	387.5	albedo: 0.058	MPC; JPL
2015 FS_{493}	18 March 2015	Subaru Telescope (T09)	52	SDO	115.7	0.64	1	41.7	189.8	albedo: 0.124	MPC; JPL
2015 FS_{561}	18 March 2015	Subaru Telescope (T09)	78	SDO	99.7	0.59	1	41.4	158.1	albedo: 0.124	MPC; JPL
2015 FS_{562}	18 March 2015	Subaru Telescope (T09)	55	SDO	101.4	0.57	3	43.5	159.4	albedo: 0.124	MPC; JPL
2015 FS_{563}	20 March 2015	Subaru Telescope (T09)	63	other TNO	51.8	0.10	1	46.7	56.8	albedo: 0.13	MPC; JPL
2015 FT_{490}	18 March 2015	Subaru Telescope (T09)	131	centaur	73.6	0.68	2	23.4	123.8	albedo: 0.058	MPC; JPL
2015 FT_{561}	18 March 2015	Subaru Telescope (T09)	65	cubewano (cold)?	44.2	0.07	1	40.9	47.4	albedo: 0.152	MPC; JPL
2015 FT_{562}	18 March 2015	Subaru Telescope (T09)	53	other TNO	76.8	0.43	4	44.2	109.4	albedo: 0.13	MPC; JPL
2015 FT_{563}	20 March 2015	Subaru Telescope (T09)	35	SDO	68.5	0.47	3	36.5	100.5	albedo: 0.124	MPC; JPL
2015 FU_{403}	17 March 2015	S. S. Sheppard (568)	122	SDO	55.0	0.34	23	36.5	73.6	albedo: 0.124	MPC; JPL
2015 FU_{490}	20 March 2015	Subaru Telescope (T09)	64	cubewano (cold)?	47.0	0.10	0	42.2	51.9	albedo: 0.152	MPC; JPL
2015 FU_{496}	25 March 2015	Subaru Telescope (T09)	88	cubewano (hot)?	44.0	0.06	16	41.2	46.8	albedo: 0.079	MPC; JPL
2015 FU_{499}	25 March 2015	Subaru Telescope (T09)	3	centaur	59.3	0.87	18	8.0	110.7	albedo: 0.058	MPC; JPL
2015 FU_{561}	20 March 2015	Subaru Telescope (T09)	120	SDO	58.4	0.38	21	36.3	80.6	albedo: 0.124	MPC; JPL
2015 FU_{562}	18 March 2015	Subaru Telescope (T09)	53	SDO	59.6	0.39	2	36.5	82.6	albedo: 0.124	MPC; JPL
2015 FU_{563}	18 March 2015	Subaru Telescope (T09)	63	cubewano (hot)?	42.6	0.10	11	38.5	46.8	albedo: 0.079	MPC; JPL
2015 FV_{397}	18 March 2015	Maunakea (568)	130	cubewano (cold)?	43.9	0.03	3	42.4	45.3	albedo: 0.152	MPC; JPL
2015 FV_{399}	18 March 2015	Maunakea (568)	95	centaur	383.8	0.93	39	26.4	741.1	albedo: 0.058	MPC; JPL
2015 FV_{403}	17 March 2015	S. S. Sheppard (568)	136	cubewano (hot)?	47.5	0.19	12	38.6	56.5	albedo: 0.079	MPC; JPL
2015 FV_{490}	18 March 2015	Subaru Telescope (T09)	51	cubewano (cold)?	44.9	0.10	1	40.5	49.3	albedo: 0.152	MPC; JPL
2015 FV_{496}	18 March 2015	Subaru Telescope (T09)	101	other TNO	51.1	0.11	15	45.6	56.6	albedo: 0.13	MPC; JPL
2015 FV_{561}	20 March 2015	Subaru Telescope (T09)	67	other TNO	34.2	0.11	20	30.6	37.8	albedo: 0.13	MPC; JPL
2015 FV_{562}	18 March 2015	Subaru Telescope (T09)	56	cubewano (cold)?	43.4	0.10	5	38.9	47.9	albedo: 0.152	MPC; JPL
2015 FV_{563}	18 March 2015	Subaru Telescope (T09)	43	SDO	62.7	0.39	1	38.5	86.9	albedo: 0.124	MPC; JPL
2015 FW_{392}	23 March 2015	M. W. Buie (695)	116	cubewano (cold)	44.8	0.09	3	40.8	48.8	albedo: 0.152	MPC; JPL
2015 FW_{398}	18 March 2015	Maunakea (568)	85	centaur	47.1	0.87	26	6.2	87.9	albedo: 0.058	MPC; JPL
2015 FW_{403}	17 March 2015	S. S. Sheppard (568)	130	cubewano (hot)?	46.3	0.14	40	39.7	52.9	albedo: 0.079	MPC; JPL
2015 FW_{490}	18 March 2015	Subaru Telescope (T09)	60	other TNO	38.6	0.11	3	34.5	42.6	albedo: 0.13	MPC; JPL
2015 FW_{539}	18 March 2015	Subaru Telescope (T09)	111	centaur	4688.4	1.00	16	23.7	9353.0	albedo: 0.058	MPC; JPL
2015 FW_{561}	20 March 2015	Subaru Telescope (T09)	72	cubewano (cold)?	43.3	0.06	1	40.6	45.9	albedo: 0.152	MPC; JPL
2015 FW_{562}	18 March 2015	Subaru Telescope (T09)	55	other TNO	61.3	0.27	1	44.5	78.1	albedo: 0.13	MPC; JPL
2015 FW_{563}	18 March 2015	Subaru Telescope (T09)	54	SDO	116.1	0.63	1	42.8	189.4	albedo: 0.124	MPC; JPL
2015 FW_{572}	20 March 2015	Subaru Telescope (T09)	—	—	126.2	0.65	4	44.7	207.7	—	MPC; JPL
2015 FX_{397}	18 March 2015	Maunakea (568)	—	—	42.8	0.15	29	36.6	49.1	—	MPC; JPL
2015 FX_{399}	18 March 2015	Maunakea (568)	59	cubewano (cold)?	43.5	0.11	2	38.8	48.1	albedo: 0.152	MPC; JPL
2015 FX_{400}	20 March 2015	Maunakea (568)	124	cubewano (hot)?	44.1	0.10	17	39.8	48.4	albedo: 0.079	MPC; JPL
2015 FX_{490}	18 March 2015	Subaru Telescope (T09)	107	cubewano (hot)?	47.7	0.10	6	42.9	52.5	albedo: 0.079	MPC; JPL
2015 FX_{561}	18 March 2015	Subaru Telescope (T09)	61	other TNO	44.7	0.24	15	34.1	55.3	albedo: 0.13	MPC; JPL
2015 FX_{562}	20 March 2015	Subaru Telescope (T09)	64	other TNO	38.8	0.10	0	34.7	42.8	albedo: 0.13	MPC; JPL
2015 FX_{563}	18 March 2015	Subaru Telescope (T09)	40	other TNO	57.4	0.30	8	40.1	74.7	albedo: 0.13	MPC; JPL
2015 FX_{579}	—	—	—	—	48.3	0.49	4	24.5	72.1	—	MPC; JPL
2015 FY_{397}	18 March 2015	Maunakea (568)	66	cubewano (cold)?	43.0	0.14	2	36.9	49.1	albedo: 0.152	MPC; JPL
2015 FY_{400}	20 March 2015	Maunakea (568)	64	cubewano (cold)?	43.9	0.08	2	40.6	47.2	albedo: 0.152	MPC; JPL
2015 FY_{489}	22 March 2015	Subaru Telescope (T09)	156	centaur	47.1	0.40	35	28.4	65.8	albedo: 0.058	MPC; JPL
2015 FY_{490}	18 March 2015	Subaru Telescope (T09)	98	centaur	51.0	0.54	14	23.5	78.6	albedo: 0.058	MPC; JPL
2015 FY_{561}	20 March 2015	Subaru Telescope (T09)	64	centaur	36.3	0.07	24	33.9	38.7	albedo: 0.058	MPC; JPL
2015 FY_{562}	20 March 2015	Subaru Telescope (T09)	90	cubewano (hot)?	42.8	0.10	11	38.4	47.1	albedo: 0.079	MPC; JPL
2015 FY_{563}	20 March 2015	Subaru Telescope (T09)	60	other TNO	51.1	0.10	1	46.1	56.1	albedo: 0.13	MPC; JPL
2015 FZ_{399}	18 March 2015	Maunakea (568)	109	SDO	78.0	0.44	3	44.1	112.0	albedo: 0.124	MPC; JPL
2015 FZ_{431}	17 March 2015	Maunakea (568)	91	SDO	66.3	0.49	15	33.9	98.8	albedo: 0.124	MPC; JPL
2015 FZ_{489}	20 March 2015	Subaru Telescope (T09)	38	SDO	116.6	0.71	26	33.5	199.8	albedo: 0.124	MPC; JPL
2015 FZ_{490}	20 March 2015	Subaru Telescope (T09)	62	cubewano (cold)?	42.2	0.11	1	37.8	46.6	albedo: 0.152	MPC; JPL
2015 FZ_{494}	20 March 2015	Subaru Telescope (T09)	141	centaur	63.4	0.74	51	16.3	110.6	albedo: 0.058	MPC; JPL
2015 FZ_{498}	20 March 2015	Subaru Telescope (T09)	170	centaur	61.1	0.62	1	23.2	99.0	albedo: 0.058	MPC; JPL
2015 FZ_{561}	18 March 2015	Subaru Telescope (T09)	114	centaur	97.9	0.79	3	20.5	175.3	albedo: 0.058	MPC; JPL
2015 FZ_{562}	25 March 2015	Subaru Telescope (T09)	91	other TNO	62.8	0.11	8	56.1	69.4	albedo: 0.13	MPC; JPL
2015 FZ_{563}	18 March 2015	Subaru Telescope (T09)	50	other TNO	38.2	0.11	17	34.1	42.3	albedo: 0.13	MPC; JPL
2015 GA_{55}	12 April 2015	Maunakea (568)	86	res · 1:3	62.5	0.39	18	38.4	86.5	albedo: 0.126	MPC; JPL
2015 GA_{56}	13 April 2015	Maunakea (568)	125	SDO	51.3	0.31	15	35.7	67.0	albedo: 0.124	MPC; JPL
2015 GA_{57}	12 April 2015	Maunakea (568)	87	cubewano (cold)	43.8	0.08	2	40.5	47.2	albedo: 0.152	MPC; JPL
2015 GA_{58}	13 April 2015	Maunakea (568)	157	cubewano (hot)	41.8	0.15	17	35.7	47.9	albedo: 0.079	MPC; JPL
2015 GA_{59}	13 April 2015	Maunakea (568)	59	cubewano (cold)	44.3	0.10	4	39.9	48.6	albedo: 0.152	MPC; JPL
2015 GA_{89}	13 April 2015	Canada-France-Hawaii Telescope (T14)	119	SDO	57.4	0.37	14	36.1	78.8	albedo: 0.124	MPC; JPL
2015 GB_{55}	13 April 2015	Maunakea (568)	75	SDO	61.9	0.41	11	36.6	87.1	albedo: 0.124	MPC; JPL
2015 GB_{56}	13 April 2015	Maunakea (568)	99	SDO	91.0	0.54	30	41.5	140.4	albedo: 0.124	MPC; JPL
2015 GB_{57}	12 April 2015	Maunakea (568)	94	cubewano (cold)	44.1	0.07	1	41.1	47.1	albedo: 0.152	MPC; JPL
2015 GB_{58}	13 April 2015	Maunakea (568)	71	cubewano (cold)	43.9	0.11	4	39.2	48.7	albedo: 0.152	MPC; JPL
2015 GB_{59}	13 April 2015	Maunakea (568)	71	cubewano (cold)	42.8	0.07	5	39.7	46.0	albedo: 0.152	MPC; JPL
2015 GC_{55}	12 April 2015	Maunakea (568)	78	res · 4:7	43.6	0.08	2	40.0	47.3	albedo: 0.126	MPC; JPL
2015 GC_{56}	13 April 2015	Maunakea (568)	124	SDO	70.3	0.46	28	37.7	102.9	albedo: 0.124	MPC; JPL
2015 GC_{57}	12 April 2015	Maunakea (568)	90	cubewano (cold)	44.2	0.08	2	40.8	47.5	albedo: 0.152	MPC; JPL
2015 GC_{58}	13 April 2015	Maunakea (568)	98	cubewano (cold)	44.1	0.03	3	42.9	45.3	binary: 39 km; albedo: 0.152	MPC; JPL
2015 GC_{59}	13 April 2015	Maunakea (568)	71	cubewano (cold)	43.3	0.03	2	42.0	44.6	albedo: 0.152	MPC; JPL
2015 GD_{55}	12 April 2015	Maunakea (568)	62	res · 4:7?	43.5	0.11	6	38.6	48.4	albedo: 0.126	MPC; JPL
2015 GD_{56}	13 April 2015	Maunakea (568)	104	SDO	65.0	0.41	6	38.2	91.9	albedo: 0.124	MPC; JPL
2015 GD_{57}	12 April 2015	Maunakea (568)	108	cubewano (cold)	46.3	0.08	3	42.4	50.1	albedo: 0.152	MPC; JPL
2015 GD_{58}	13 April 2015	Maunakea (568)	98	cubewano (cold)	43.5	0.08	3	40.1	47.0	albedo: 0.152	MPC; JPL
2015 GD_{59}	13 April 2015	Maunakea (568)	118	cubewano (cold)	44.7	0.09	3	40.6	48.7	albedo: 0.152	MPC; JPL
2015 GE_{55}	12 April 2015	Maunakea (568)	98	res · 4:7	43.6	0.06	2	41.1	46.1	albedo: 0.126	MPC; JPL
2015 GE_{56}	12 April 2015	Maunakea (568)	65	cubewano (cold)	43.1	0.05	0	40.8	45.3	albedo: 0.152	MPC; JPL
2015 GE_{57}	12 April 2015	Maunakea (568)	82	cubewano (cold)	42.9	0.01	3	42.3	43.5	albedo: 0.152	MPC; JPL
2015 GE_{58}	13 April 2015	Maunakea (568)	71	cubewano (cold)	42.7	0.03	4	41.6	43.9	albedo: 0.152	MPC; JPL
2015 GE_{59}	13 April 2015	Maunakea (568)	119	cubewano (hot)	43.1	0.03	13	41.6	44.6	albedo: 0.079	MPC; JPL
2015 GF_{54}	12 April 2015	Maunakea (568)	97	plutino	39.4	0.28	11	28.4	50.3	albedo: 0.074	MPC; JPL
2015 GF_{55}	12 April 2015	Maunakea (568)	54	res · 4:7	43.6	0.25	5	32.7	54.4	albedo: 0.126	MPC; JPL
2015 GF_{56}	12 April 2015	Maunakea (568)	82	cubewano (cold)	42.6	0.01	2	42.3	43.0	albedo: 0.152	MPC; JPL
2015 GF_{57}	12 April 2015	Maunakea (568)	75	cubewano (cold)?	46.6	0.16	1	39.2	54.0	albedo: 0.152	MPC; JPL
2015 GF_{58}	13 April 2015	Maunakea (568)	103	cubewano (cold)	43.9	0.08	3	40.3	47.5	albedo: 0.152	MPC; JPL
2015 GF_{59}	13 April 2015	Maunakea (568)	86	cubewano (cold)	42.9	0.07	3	40.0	45.9	albedo: 0.152	MPC; JPL
2015 GG_{54}	12 April 2015	Maunakea (568)	67	plutino	39.5	0.26	1	29.1	49.9	albedo: 0.074	MPC; JPL
2015 GG_{55}	13 April 2015	Maunakea (568)	57	res · 4:7	43.5	0.16	3	36.4	50.6	albedo: 0.126	MPC; JPL
2015 GG_{56}	12 April 2015	Maunakea (568)	86	cubewano (cold)	43.5	0.09	4	39.6	47.4	albedo: 0.152	MPC; JPL
2015 GG_{57}	12 April 2015	Maunakea (568)	103	cubewano (cold)	44.0	0.06	1	41.3	46.7	albedo: 0.152	MPC; JPL
2015 GG_{58}	13 April 2015	Maunakea (568)	86	cubewano (cold)	44.1	0.07	2	41.2	47.0	albedo: 0.152	MPC; JPL
2015 GG_{59}	13 April 2015	Maunakea (568)	99	cubewano (hot)?	46.8	0.17	8	39.0	54.5	albedo: 0.079	MPC; JPL
2015 GH_{54}	12 April 2015	Maunakea (568)	56	plutino	39.3	0.26	18	29.1	49.4	albedo: 0.074	MPC; JPL
2015 GH_{55}	13 April 2015	Maunakea (568)	59	cubewano (cold)	43.7	0.12	5	38.5	49.0	albedo: 0.152	MPC; JPL
2015 GH_{56}	12 April 2015	Maunakea (568)	150	cubewano (hot)?	46.3	0.24	38	35.2	57.3	albedo: 0.079	MPC; JPL
2015 GH_{57}	12 April 2015	Maunakea (568)	71	cubewano (cold)	42.8	0.02	1	41.9	43.7	albedo: 0.152	MPC; JPL
2015 GH_{58}	13 April 2015	Maunakea (568)	103	cubewano (cold)	43.5	0.03	2	42.2	44.7	binary: 31 km; albedo: 0.152	MPC; JPL
2015 GH_{59}	13 April 2015	Maunakea (568)	99	cubewano (hot)	43.3	0.04	5	41.4	45.2	albedo: 0.079	MPC; JPL
2015 GJ_{54}	12 April 2015	Maunakea (568)	141	plutino	39.2	0.20	19	31.3	47.1	albedo: 0.074	MPC; JPL
2015 GJ_{55}	13 April 2015	Maunakea (568)	82	res · 4:7	43.8	0.17	4	36.3	51.3	albedo: 0.126	MPC; JPL
2015 GJ_{56}	12 April 2015	Maunakea (568)	78	cubewano (cold)	43.8	0.07	4	40.9	46.6	albedo: 0.152	MPC; JPL
2015 GJ_{57}	12 April 2015	Maunakea (568)	99	cubewano (cold)	43.3	0.03	1	41.8	44.7	albedo: 0.152	MPC; JPL
2015 GJ_{58}	13 April 2015	Maunakea (568)	75	cubewano (cold)	45.2	0.12	4	40.0	50.5	albedo: 0.152	MPC; JPL
2015 GJ_{59}	13 April 2015	Maunakea (568)	82	cubewano (cold)	45.0	0.04	4	43.2	46.9	albedo: 0.152	MPC; JPL
2015 GK_{54}	12 April 2015	Maunakea (568)	85	plutino	39.4	0.31	31	27.1	51.7	albedo: 0.074	MPC; JPL
2015 GK_{55}	13 April 2015	Maunakea (568)	52	res · 4:7	43.6	0.26	27	32.2	55.0	albedo: 0.126	MPC; JPL
2015 GK_{56}	12 April 2015	Maunakea (568)	98	cubewano (cold)	44.5	0.11	2	39.8	49.2	albedo: 0.152	MPC; JPL
2015 GK_{57}	12 April 2015	Maunakea (568)	59	cubewano (cold)	44.0	0.09	2	39.8	48.1	albedo: 0.152	MPC; JPL
2015 GK_{58}	13 April 2015	Maunakea (568)	124	cubewano (hot)	44.1	0.09	6	39.9	48.2	albedo: 0.079	MPC; JPL
2015 GL_{54}	12 April 2015	Maunakea (568)	97	plutino	39.4	0.24	1	30.1	48.7	albedo: 0.074	MPC; JPL
2015 GL_{55}	13 April 2015	Maunakea (568)	114	res · 4:7	43.6	0.05	11	41.3	45.9	albedo: 0.126	MPC; JPL
2015 GL_{56}	12 April 2015	Maunakea (568)	105	other TNO	40.0	0.08	18	36.7	43.3	albedo: 0.13	MPC; JPL
2015 GL_{57}	12 April 2015	Maunakea (568)	84	cubewano (cold)	43.1	0.02	1	42.4	43.8	albedo: 0.152	MPC; JPL
2015 GL_{58}	13 April 2015	Maunakea (568)	94	cubewano (cold)	44.3	0.06	2	41.8	46.9	albedo: 0.152	MPC; JPL
2015 GM_{54}	12 April 2015	Maunakea (568)	112	plutino	39.5	0.24	9	30.2	48.9	albedo: 0.074	MPC; JPL
2015 GM_{55}	12 April 2015	Maunakea (568)	49	res · 2:5	55.4	0.44	9	31.2	79.6	albedo: 0.126	MPC; JPL
2015 GM_{56}	12 April 2015	Maunakea (568)	78	cubewano (cold)	43.8	0.05	2	41.7	45.9	albedo: 0.152	MPC; JPL
2015 GM_{57}	12 April 2015	Maunakea (568)	71	cubewano (cold)	44.0	0.07	3	41.0	46.9	albedo: 0.152	MPC; JPL
2015 GM_{58}	13 April 2015	Maunakea (568)	94	cubewano (cold)	43.7	0.05	3	41.4	46.0	albedo: 0.152	MPC; JPL
2015 GN_{54}	12 April 2015	Maunakea (568)	85	plutino	39.5	0.17	1	32.9	46.0	albedo: 0.074	MPC; JPL
2015 GN_{55}	13 April 2015	Maunakea (568)	229	res · 2:5	55.2	0.41	8	32.5	78.0	albedo: 0.126	MPC; JPL
2015 GN_{56}	12 April 2015	Maunakea (568)	65	cubewano (cold)	42.6	0.05	3	40.7	44.6	albedo: 0.152	MPC; JPL
2015 GN_{57}	12 April 2015	Maunakea (568)	78	cubewano (cold)	44.9	0.05	1	42.8	46.9	albedo: 0.152	MPC; JPL
2015 GN_{58}	13 April 2015	Maunakea (568)	118	cubewano (cold)	46.0	0.11	3	41.2	50.9	albedo: 0.152	MPC; JPL
2015 GN_{89}	—	—	—	—	40.4	0.02	15	39.6	41.1	—	MPC; JPL
2015 GO_{54}	12 April 2015	Maunakea (568)	93	plutino	39.1	0.27	10	28.5	49.7	albedo: 0.074	MPC; JPL
2015 GO_{55}	13 April 2015	Maunakea (568)	82	res · 3:5?	42.3	0.12	8	37.3	47.3	albedo: 0.126	MPC; JPL
2015 GO_{56}	12 April 2015	Maunakea (568)	116	cubewano (hot)	46.6	0.06	11	43.6	49.5	albedo: 0.079	MPC; JPL
2015 GO_{57}	12 April 2015	Maunakea (568)	105	cubewano (cold)	43.1	0.04	1	41.5	44.7	possible binary; albedo: 0.152	MPC; JPL
2015 GO_{58}	13 April 2015	Maunakea (568)	82	cubewano (cold)	44.2	0.05	4	42.2	46.3	albedo: 0.152	MPC; JPL
2015 GP_{50}	14 April 2015	S. S. Sheppard, C. A. Trujillo (807)	189	SDO	54.8	0.27	24	40.2	69.3	albedo: 0.124	MPC; JPL
2015 GP_{54}	12 April 2015	Maunakea (568)	85	plutino	39.4	0.30	11	27.7	51.1	albedo: 0.074	MPC; JPL
2015 GP_{55}	12 April 2015	Maunakea (568)	76	res · 3:4	36.3	0.12	10	32.0	40.7	albedo: 0.126	MPC; JPL
2015 GP_{56}	12 April 2015	Maunakea (568)	75	cubewano (hot)?	41.7	0.17	30	34.5	48.9	albedo: 0.079	MPC; JPL
2015 GP_{57}	12 April 2015	Maunakea (568)	54	cubewano (cold)?	45.2	0.17	5	37.6	52.8	albedo: 0.152	MPC; JPL
2015 GP_{58}	13 April 2015	Maunakea (568)	130	cubewano (cold)	44.0	0.07	3	40.8	47.2	binary: 86 km; albedo: 0.152	MPC; JPL
2015 GQ_{50}	13 April 2015	Cerro Tololo Observatory (807)	188	cubewano (hot)?	46.2	0.17	12	38.4	53.9	albedo: 0.079	MPC; JPL
2015 GQ_{54}	13 April 2015	Maunakea (568)	123	plutino	39.3	0.18	11	32.3	46.4	albedo: 0.074	MPC; JPL
2015 GQ_{55}	12 April 2015	Maunakea (568)	113	cubewano (hot)	42.8	0.10	21	38.7	46.9	albedo: 0.079	MPC; JPL
2015 GQ_{56}	12 April 2015	Maunakea (568)	159	cubewano (hot)	42.9	0.10	18	38.5	47.4	albedo: 0.079	MPC; JPL
2015 GQ_{57}	12 April 2015	Maunakea (568)	71	cubewano (cold)	44.9	0.11	1	40.2	49.7	albedo: 0.152	MPC; JPL
2015 GQ_{58}	13 April 2015	Maunakea (568)	103	cubewano (cold)	45.6	0.12	2	39.9	51.2	albedo: 0.152	MPC; JPL
2015 GR_{50}	13 April 2015	Cerro Tololo Observatory (807)	181	SDO	53.8	0.30	5	37.7	69.8	albedo: 0.124	MPC; JPL
2015 GR_{54}	13 April 2015	Maunakea (568)	93	plutino	39.2	0.22	10	30.5	47.9	albedo: 0.074	MPC; JPL
2015 GR_{55}	13 April 2015	Maunakea (568)	64	other TNO	38.5	0.10	24	34.7	42.4	albedo: 0.13	MPC; JPL
2015 GR_{56}	12 April 2015	Maunakea (568)	103	cubewano (cold)	44.1	0.03	1	42.6	45.6	possible binary; albedo: 0.152	MPC; JPL
2015 GR_{57}	12 April 2015	Maunakea (568)	103	cubewano (cold)	43.9	0.06	2	41.3	46.5	albedo: 0.152	MPC; JPL
2015 GR_{58}	13 April 2015	Maunakea (568)	59	cubewano (cold)	44.0	0.08	2	40.5	47.5	albedo: 0.152	MPC; JPL
2015 GR_{65}	13 April 2015	Maunakea (568)	71	plutino	39.2	0.29	2	27.9	50.5	albedo: 0.074	MPC; JPL
2015 GS_{50}	13 April 2015	Cerro Tololo Observatory (807)	163	twotino	47.5	0.25	2	35.5	59.6	albedo: 0.126	MPC; JPL
2015 GS_{54}	13 April 2015	Maunakea (568)	96	plutino	39.6	0.24	4	30.1	49.0	albedo: 0.074	MPC; JPL
2015 GS_{55}	13 April 2015	Maunakea (568)	167	cubewano (hot)?	44.1	0.19	25	35.6	52.6	albedo: 0.079	MPC; JPL
2015 GS_{56}	12 April 2015	Maunakea (568)	90	cubewano (cold)	43.2	0.02	1	42.5	43.9	possible binary; albedo: 0.152	MPC; JPL
2015 GS_{57}	13 April 2015	Maunakea (568)	90	cubewano (cold)	44.0	0.04	2	42.1	45.9	albedo: 0.152	MPC; JPL
2015 GS_{58}	13 April 2015	Maunakea (568)	75	cubewano (cold)	43.2	0.06	2	40.6	45.9	albedo: 0.152	MPC; JPL
2015 GT50	13 April 2015	OSSOS (568)	75	ESDO	317.2	0.88	9	38.3	596.0	albedo: 0.124	MPC; JPL
2015 GT_{54}	13 April 2015	Maunakea (568)	64	plutino	39.2	0.18	6	32.0	46.3	albedo: 0.074	MPC; JPL
2015 GT_{55}	13 April 2015	Maunakea (568)	62	cubewano (hot)?	45.9	0.25	12	34.5	57.3	albedo: 0.079	MPC; JPL
2015 GT_{56}	12 April 2015	Maunakea (568)	108	cubewano (hot)	45.7	0.06	11	42.8	48.5	albedo: 0.079	MPC; JPL
2015 GT_{57}	13 April 2015	Maunakea (568)	71	cubewano (cold)	43.9	0.07	2	40.9	46.9	albedo: 0.152	MPC; JPL
2015 GT_{58}	13 April 2015	Maunakea (568)	109	cubewano (cold)	43.8	0.07	2	40.9	46.7	albedo: 0.152	MPC; JPL
2015 GU_{54}	13 April 2015	Maunakea (568)	102	plutino	39.4	0.10	6	35.4	43.3	albedo: 0.074	MPC; JPL
2015 GU_{55}	12 April 2015	Maunakea (568)	106	SDO	94.4	0.63	25	35.1	153.7	albedo: 0.124	MPC; JPL
2015 GU_{56}	12 April 2015	Maunakea (568)	124	cubewano (cold)	43.4	0.05	3	41.4	45.4	binary: 76 km; albedo: 0.152	MPC; JPL
2015 GU_{57}	13 April 2015	Maunakea (568)	94	cubewano (cold)	44.1	0.08	2	40.6	47.6	albedo: 0.152	MPC; JPL
2015 GU_{58}	13 April 2015	Maunakea (568)	149	cubewano (cold)	44.2	0.08	3	40.8	47.7	albedo: 0.152	MPC; JPL
2015 GV_{54}	13 April 2015	Maunakea (568)	74	plutino	39.5	0.23	3	30.3	48.7	albedo: 0.074	MPC; JPL
2015 GV_{55}	12 April 2015	Maunakea (568)	154	centaur	31.4	0.31	28	21.8	40.9	albedo: 0.058	MPC; JPL
2015 GV_{56}	12 April 2015	Maunakea (568)	65	cubewano (cold)	45.9	0.11	2	40.9	50.8	albedo: 0.152	MPC; JPL
2015 GV_{57}	13 April 2015	Maunakea (568)	68	cubewano (cold)	42.9	0.05	2	40.8	45.1	albedo: 0.152	MPC; JPL
2015 GV_{58}	13 April 2015	Maunakea (568)	71	cubewano (cold)	42.9	0.02	2	42.2	43.6	albedo: 0.152	MPC; JPL
2015 GW_{54}	13 April 2015	Maunakea (568)	56	plutino	39.3	0.18	3	32.1	46.5	albedo: 0.074	MPC; JPL
2015 GW_{55}	13 April 2015	Maunakea (568)	173	SDO	86.3	0.61	14	33.7	138.8	albedo: 0.124	MPC; JPL
2015 GW_{56}	12 April 2015	Maunakea (568)	90	cubewano (cold)	45.3	0.11	2	40.4	50.2	albedo: 0.152	MPC; JPL
2015 GW_{57}	13 April 2015	Maunakea (568)	82	cubewano (cold)	44.9	0.05	4	42.8	47.0	albedo: 0.152	MPC; JPL
2015 GW_{58}	13 April 2015	Maunakea (568)	124	cubewano (hot)	45.3	0.13	12	39.7	51.0	albedo: 0.079	MPC; JPL
2015 GX_{54}	13 April 2015	Maunakea (568)	77	plutino	39.3	0.16	14	33.0	45.6	albedo: 0.074	MPC; JPL
2015 GX_{55}	13 April 2015	Maunakea (568)	73	centaur	188.2	0.92	53	14.8	361.6	albedo: 0.058	MPC; JPL
2015 GX_{56}	12 April 2015	Maunakea (568)	90	cubewano (cold)	44.3	0.08	2	40.7	47.9	albedo: 0.152	MPC; JPL
2015 GX_{57}	13 April 2015	Maunakea (568)	90	cubewano (hot)?	45.6	0.18	14	37.3	54.0	albedo: 0.079	MPC; JPL
2015 GX_{58}	13 April 2015	Maunakea (568)	86	cubewano (cold)	43.7	0.07	4	40.6	46.7	albedo: 0.152	MPC; JPL
2015 GY_{51}	13 April 2015	OSSOS (568)	113	twotino	47.6	0.31	9	32.7	62.4	albedo: 0.126	MPC; JPL
2015 GY_{54}	13 April 2015	Maunakea (568)	74	plutino	39.3	0.12	4	34.6	43.9	albedo: 0.074	MPC; JPL
2015 GY_{55}	13 April 2015	Maunakea (568)	126	SDO	100.6	0.64	5	36.0	165.2	albedo: 0.124	MPC; JPL
2015 GY_{56}	12 April 2015	Maunakea (568)	82	cubewano (cold)	43.3	0.05	1	41.3	45.3	albedo: 0.152	MPC; JPL
2015 GY_{57}	13 April 2015	Maunakea (568)	75	cubewano (cold)	43.9	0.07	2	40.6	47.1	albedo: 0.152	MPC; JPL
2015 GY_{58}	13 April 2015	Maunakea (568)	75	cubewano (cold)	44.5	0.07	3	41.5	47.5	albedo: 0.152	MPC; JPL
2015 GY_{88}	13 April 2015	Canada-France-Hawaii Telescope (T14)	140	plutino	39.4	0.11	11	34.9	43.9	albedo: 0.074	MPC; JPL
2015 GZ_{54}	13 April 2015	Maunakea (568)	108	twotino	47.8	0.28	2	34.5	61.2	albedo: 0.126	MPC; JPL
2015 GZ_{55}	12 April 2015	Maunakea (568)	99	SDO	64.8	0.42	4	37.5	92.1	albedo: 0.124	MPC; JPL
2015 GZ_{56}	12 April 2015	Maunakea (568)	136	cubewano (cold)	44.1	0.07	1	41.1	47.1	albedo: 0.152	MPC; JPL
2015 GZ_{57}	13 April 2015	Maunakea (568)	78	cubewano (cold)	44.2	0.06	4	41.4	46.9	albedo: 0.152	MPC; JPL
2015 GZ_{58}	13 April 2015	Maunakea (568)	108	cubewano (hot)	42.7	0.06	5	40.1	45.3	albedo: 0.079	MPC; JPL
2015 GZ_{89}	—	—	—	—	33.6	0.28	22	24.3	43.0	—	MPC; JPL
2015 HA_{197}	18 April 2015	DECam (W84)	165	SDO	55.6	0.39	41	33.7	77.4	albedo: 0.124	MPC; JPL
2015 HA_{199}	19 April 2015	DECam (W84)	—	—	43.4	0.08	12	39.9	47.0	—	MPC; JPL
2015 HB_{195}	25 April 2015	DECam (W84)	—	—	67.2	0.48	5	35.0	99.3	—	MPC; JPL
2015 HB_{197}	18 April 2015	DECam (W84)	—	—	45.1	0.18	11	37.0	53.1	—	MPC; JPL
2015 HB_{198}	18 April 2015	DECam (W84)	—	—	43.1	0.02	12	42.2	44.0	—	MPC; JPL
2015 HB_{199}	19 April 2015	DECam (W84)	—	—	43.3	0.05	15	40.9	45.6	—	MPC; JPL
2015 HC_{195}	25 April 2015	DECam (W84)	—	—	39.1	0.18	7	32.2	46.0	—	MPC; JPL
2015 HC_{196}	25 April 2015	DECam (W84)	—	—	39.4	0.14	6	34.1	44.7	—	MPC; JPL
2015 HC_{198}	18 April 2015	DECam (W84)	—	—	64.4	0.46	12	34.9	93.9	—	MPC; JPL
2015 HD_{195}	25 April 2015	DECam (W84)	—	—	48.4	0.29	5	34.1	62.6	—	MPC; JPL
2015 HE_{195}	25 April 2015	DECam (W84)	—	—	45.4	0.16	11	38.2	52.6	—	MPC; JPL
2015 HE_{199}	19 April 2015	DECam (W84)	—	—	43.5	0.29	32	31.1	55.9	—	MPC; JPL
2015 HF_{195}	25 April 2015	DECam (W84)	130	res · 4:7?	43.5	0.22	6	33.9	53.1	albedo: 0.126	MPC; JPL
2015 HF_{198}	18 April 2015	DECam (W84)	—	—	44.0	0.06	4	41.3	46.6	—	MPC; JPL
2015 HF_{199}	19 April 2015	DECam (W84)	—	—	45.5	0.06	4	42.7	48.3	—	MPC; JPL
2015 HG_{195}	25 April 2015	DECam (W84)	—	—	50.0	0.34	26	33.1	66.9	—	MPC; JPL
2015 HG_{199}	19 April 2015	DECam (W84)	—	—	43.8	0.11	1	39.1	48.5	—	MPC; JPL
2015 HH_{197}	18 April 2015	DECam (W84)	—	—	39.2	0.20	13	31.5	46.8	—	MPC; JPL
2015 HH_{198}	18 April 2015	DECam (W84)	—	—	45.8	0.17	12	37.8	53.7	—	MPC; JPL
2015 HL_{197}	18 April 2015	DECam (W84)	—	—	39.5	0.21	8	31.2	47.8	—	MPC; JPL
2015 HL_{198}	18 April 2015	DECam (W84)	—	—	44.3	0.07	4	41.1	47.5	—	MPC; JPL
2015 HM_{196}	25 April 2015	DECam (W84)	—	—	39.4	0.26	23	29.1	49.7	—	MPC; JPL
2015 HM_{198}	18 April 2015	DECam (W84)	—	—	52.2	0.30	23	36.5	67.9	—	MPC; JPL
2015 HN_{198}	18 April 2015	DECam (W84)	—	—	42.1	0.21	5	33.2	51.0	—	MPC; JPL
2015 HO_{196}	25 April 2015	DECam (W84)	—	—	42.5	0.12	32	37.4	47.7	—	MPC; JPL
2015 HP_{197}	18 April 2015	DECam (W84)	—	—	42.9	0.07	11	40.1	45.7	—	MPC; JPL
2015 HP_{198}	18 April 2015	DECam (W84)	97	twotino	47.7	0.31	8	33.2	62.2	albedo: 0.126	MPC; JPL
2015 HQ_{195}	25 April 2015	DECam (W84)	—	—	50.0	0.26	31	36.9	63.1	—	MPC; JPL
2015 HQ_{522}	—	—	—	—	74.1	0.50	31	36.8	111.5	—	MPC; JPL
2015 HS_{197}	18 April 2015	DECam (W84)	—	—	39.0	0.25	8	29.2	48.9	—	MPC; JPL
2015 HS_{198}	18 April 2015	DECam (W84)	—	—	45.6	0.17	8	37.7	53.5	—	MPC; JPL
2015 HT_{195}	25 April 2015	DECam (W84)	—	—	34.8	0.11	3	31.1	38.5	—	MPC; JPL
2015 HT_{198}	18 April 2015	DECam (W84)	—	—	43.5	0.08	12	39.9	47.2	—	MPC; JPL
2015 HU_{195}	25 April 2015	DECam (W84)	—	—	47.6	0.25	1	35.5	59.6	—	MPC; JPL
2015 HU_{197}	18 April 2015	DECam (W84)	—	—	62.6	0.44	9	35.4	89.9	—	MPC; JPL
2015 HU_{198}	18 April 2015	DECam (W84)	—	—	40.8	0.05	15	39.0	42.6	—	MPC; JPL
2015 HW_{198}	19 April 2015	DECam (W84)	94	SDO	66.4	0.54	11	30.9	101.9	albedo: 0.124	MPC; JPL
2015 HY_{195}	25 April 2015	DECam (W84)	234	res · 1:4	75.6	0.52	22	36.6	114.7	albedo: 0.126	MPC; JPL
2015 HY_{198}	19 April 2015	DECam (W84)	—	—	44.8	0.19	22	36.5	53.1	—	MPC; JPL
2015 HZ_{194}	25 April 2015	DECam (W84)	—	—	39.3	0.22	6	30.8	47.9	—	MPC; JPL
2015 HZ_{196}	19 April 2015	DECam (W84)	136	cubewano (cold)	43.1	0.04	2	41.3	44.9	albedo: 0.152	MPC; JPL
2015 JB_{13}	15 May 2015	Maunakea (568)	67	SDO	369.3	0.91	12	32.9	705.7	albedo: 0.124	MPC; JPL
2015 JC_{13}	15 May 2015	Maunakea (568)	52	SDO	74.3	0.57	19	31.6	116.9	albedo: 0.124	MPC; JPL
2015 JD_{13}	15 May 2015	Maunakea (568)	86	cubewano (hot)?	41.6	0.08	29	38.4	44.8	albedo: 0.079	MPC; JPL
2015 JE_{13}	15 May 2015	Maunakea (568)	67	plutino	39.2	0.08	17	36.0	42.4	albedo: 0.074	MPC; JPL
2015 JF_{13}	15 May 2015	Maunakea (568)	53	SDO	56.5	0.34	19	37.1	76.0	albedo: 0.124	MPC; JPL
2015 JG_{13}	15 May 2015	Maunakea (568)	108	cubewano (hot)?	44.9	0.04	16	42.9	46.9	albedo: 0.079	MPC; JPL
2015 JH_{13}	15 May 2015	Maunakea (568)	46	centaur	47.5	0.56	22	21.0	74.0	albedo: 0.058	MPC; JPL
2015 JL_{13}	15 May 2015	Maunakea (568)	123	other TNO	54.9	0.28	32	39.7	70.0	albedo: 0.13	MPC; JPL
2015 JN_{13}	15 May 2015	Maunakea (568)	115	centaur	41.3	0.28	12	29.9	52.7	albedo: 0.058	MPC; JPL
2015 JO_{13}	15 May 2015	Maunakea (568)	61	other TNO	43.7	0.28	17	31.6	55.8	albedo: 0.13	MPC; JPL
2015 JP_{13}	15 May 2015	Maunakea (568)	128	centaur	70.5	0.68	12	22.5	118.5	albedo: 0.058	MPC; JPL
2015 JR_{13}	15 May 2015	Maunakea (568)	—	—	109.0	0.68	18	34.8	183.3	—	MPC; JPL
2015 KA_{174}	24 May 2015	Maunakea (568)	104	res · 4:7?	43.6	0.13	14	38.1	49.0	albedo: 0.126	MPC; JPL
2015 KA_{175}	21 May 2015	Maunakea (568)	181	cubewano (hot)	43.2	0.07	9	40.2	46.2	albedo: 0.079	MPC; JPL
2015 KA_{176}	24 May 2015	Maunakea (568)	94	cubewano (hot)	44.1	0.14	6	37.9	50.4	albedo: 0.079	MPC; JPL
2015 KB_{174}	24 May 2015	Maunakea (568)	90	res · 4:7	43.5	0.07	6	40.4	46.6	albedo: 0.126	MPC; JPL
2015 KB_{175}	21 May 2015	Maunakea (568)	178	cubewano (hot)	42.0	0.10	9	37.6	46.4	albedo: 0.079	MPC; JPL
2015 KB_{176}	24 May 2015	Maunakea (568)	68	cubewano (hot)?	45.0	0.18	28	36.9	53.1	albedo: 0.079	MPC; JPL
2015 KC_{163}	27 May 2015	DECam (W84)	80	cubewano (cold)?	46.0	0.16	3	38.5	53.6	albedo: 0.152	MPC; JPL
2015 KC_{173}	21 May 2015	Maunakea (568)	93	plutino	39.3	0.14	17	34.0	44.6	albedo: 0.074	MPC; JPL
2015 KC_{174}	21 May 2015	Maunakea (568)	98	res · 2:5	55.4	0.41	8	32.8	78.1	albedo: 0.126	MPC; JPL
2015 KC_{175}	21 May 2015	Maunakea (568)	108	cubewano (hot)?	46.1	0.21	30	36.5	55.7	albedo: 0.079	MPC; JPL
2015 KC_{176}	24 May 2015	Maunakea (568)	82	cubewano (hot)	41.8	0.10	11	37.6	46.1	albedo: 0.079	MPC; JPL
2015 KC_{465}	21 May 2015	Subaru Telescope (T09)	100	SDO	65.3	0.45	24	35.7	95.0	albedo: 0.124	MPC; JPL
2015 KD_{163}	27 May 2015	DECam (W84)	224	centaur	35.9	0.19	32	29.2	42.5	albedo: 0.058	MPC; JPL
2015 KD_{173}	21 May 2015	Maunakea (568)	54	plutino	39.3	0.25	7	29.6	49.0	albedo: 0.074	MPC; JPL
2015 KD_{174}	21 May 2015	Maunakea (568)	62	res · 2:5	55.0	0.42	17	32.1	77.9	albedo: 0.126	MPC; JPL
2015 KD_{175}	21 May 2015	Maunakea (568)	82	cubewano (hot)?	45.8	0.18	26	37.5	54.2	albedo: 0.079	MPC; JPL
2015 KD_{176}	24 May 2015	Maunakea (568)	143	cubewano (hot)	46.0	0.15	12	39.1	52.8	albedo: 0.079	MPC; JPL
2015 KE172	21 May 2015	OSSOS (568)	90	res · 1:9	128.7	0.66	38	44.1	213.3	albedo: 0.126	MPC; JPL
2015 KE_{173}	21 May 2015	Maunakea (568)	115	plutino	39.2	0.25	8	29.3	49.2	albedo: 0.074	MPC; JPL
2015 KE_{174}	21 May 2015	Maunakea (568)	91	res · 2:5	55.2	0.29	24	39.3	71.1	albedo: 0.126	MPC; JPL
2015 KE_{175}	21 May 2015	Maunakea (568)	159	cubewano (hot)	45.6	0.12	7	40.2	51.0	albedo: 0.079	MPC; JPL
2015 KF_{172}	20 May 2015	DECam (W84)	300	SDO	69.2	0.45	12	37.8	100.7	albedo: 0.124	MPC; JPL
2015 KF_{173}	21 May 2015	Maunakea (568)	97	plutino	39.2	0.26	15	29.2	49.2	albedo: 0.074	MPC; JPL
2015 KF_{174}	21 May 2015	Maunakea (568)	37	res · 2:5	55.4	0.47	9	29.5	81.3	albedo: 0.126	MPC; JPL
2015 KF_{175}	21 May 2015	Maunakea (568)	90	cubewano (hot)?	45.1	0.18	9	36.9	53.3	albedo: 0.079	MPC; JPL
2015 KF_{176}	19 May 2015	DECam (W84)	—	—	39.1	0.15	2	33.4	44.7	—	MPC; JPL
2015 KF_{459}	17 May 2015	Subaru Telescope (T09)	73	res · 4:7	43.5	0.20	16	34.8	52.2	albedo: 0.126	MPC; JPL
2015 KF_{465}	21 May 2015	Subaru Telescope (T09)	83	cubewano (hot)?	43.5	0.12	15	38.4	48.7	albedo: 0.079	MPC; JPL
2015 KG163	24 May 2015	OSSOS (568)	86	ESDO	638.8	0.94	14	40.5	1237.1	albedo: 0.124	MPC; JPL
2015 KG_{166}	17 May 2015	Maunakea (568)	56	other TNO	34.3	0.03	18	33.3	35.3	albedo: 0.13	MPC; JPL
2015 KG_{172}	20 May 2015	DECam (W84)	227	SDO	55.5	0.27	32	40.6	70.4	albedo: 0.124	MPC; JPL
2015 KG_{173}	21 May 2015	Maunakea (568)	59	plutino	39.3	0.28	7	28.3	50.2	albedo: 0.074	MPC; JPL
2015 KG_{174}	24 May 2015	Maunakea (568)	68	res · 2:5	55.2	0.45	19	30.2	80.1	albedo: 0.126	MPC; JPL
2015 KG_{175}	21 May 2015	Maunakea (568)	148	cubewano (hot)	43.3	0.08	7	39.9	46.8	albedo: 0.079	MPC; JPL
2015 KG_{456}	21 May 2015	Subaru Telescope (T09)	63	cubewano (hot)?	42.2	0.14	15	36.4	47.9	albedo: 0.079	MPC; JPL
2015 KG_{465}	17 May 2015	Subaru Telescope (T09)	105	SDO	83.2	0.61	18	32.3	134.2	albedo: 0.124	MPC; JPL
2015 KH_{163}	24 May 2015	OSSOS (568)	99	SDO	151.0	0.74	27	39.9	262.1	albedo: 0.124	MPC; JPL
2015 KH_{166}	17 May 2015	Maunakea (568)	142	SDO	82.9	0.63	23	31.0	134.7	albedo: 0.124	MPC; JPL
2015 KH_{173}	21 May 2015	Maunakea (568)	49	plutino	39.4	0.29	10	28.1	50.6	albedo: 0.074	MPC; JPL
2015 KH_{174}	24 May 2015	Maunakea (568)	103	res · 2:5	55.0	0.43	10	31.6	78.4	albedo: 0.126	MPC; JPL
2015 KH_{175}	21 May 2015	Maunakea (568)	78	cubewano (hot)?	40.2	0.07	18	37.3	43.0	albedo: 0.079	MPC; JPL
2015 KH_{456}	17 May 2015	Subaru Telescope (T09)	72	other TNO	44.8	0.22	15	34.8	54.8	albedo: 0.13	MPC; JPL
2015 KH_{463}	17 May 2015	Canada-France-Hawaii Telescope (T14)	162	cubewano (hot)?	47.2	0.11	30	42.2	52.3	albedo: 0.079	MPC; JPL
2015 KJ_{166}	17 May 2015	Maunakea (568)	122	other TNO	52.9	0.32	25	35.9	69.9	albedo: 0.13	MPC; JPL
2015 KJ_{173}	21 May 2015	Maunakea (568)	85	plutino	39.2	0.11	11	34.9	43.6	albedo: 0.074	MPC; JPL
2015 KJ_{174}	21 May 2015	Maunakea (568)	92	res · 3:5?	42.3	0.10	11	38.0	46.5	albedo: 0.126	MPC; JPL
2015 KJ_{175}	21 May 2015	Maunakea (568)	130	cubewano (hot)	42.9	0.12	40	37.8	47.9	albedo: 0.079	MPC; JPL
2015 KJ_{176}	20 May 2015	DECam (W84)	—	—	58.6	0.45	10	32.3	84.8	—	MPC; JPL
2015 KJ_{465}	21 May 2015	Subaru Telescope (T09)	54	other TNO	45.1	0.16	34	37.7	52.5	albedo: 0.13	MPC; JPL
2015 KK_{166}	17 May 2015	Maunakea (568)	122	cubewano (hot)?	40.9	0.12	14	36.0	45.9	albedo: 0.079	MPC; JPL
2015 KK_{173}	21 May 2015	Maunakea (568)	74	plutino	39.1	0.26	11	29.1	49.1	albedo: 0.074	MPC; JPL
2015 KK_{174}	21 May 2015	Maunakea (568)	82	res · 3:5	42.2	0.24	10	32.1	52.3	albedo: 0.126	MPC; JPL
2015 KK_{175}	21 May 2015	Maunakea (568)	130	cubewano (hot)	45.1	0.15	9	38.4	51.7	albedo: 0.079	MPC; JPL
2015 KK_{178}	20 May 2015	DECam (W84)	186	other TNO	36.8	0.02	23	36.2	37.3	albedo: 0.13	MPC; JPL
2015 KK_{199}	24 May 2015	Maunakea (568)	58	SDO	60.5	0.41	5	35.9	85.0	albedo: 0.124	MPC; JPL
2015 KK_{467}	17 May 2015	Canada-France-Hawaii Telescope (T14)	120	cubewano (hot)?	41.4	0.15	15	35.1	47.6	albedo: 0.079	MPC; JPL
2015 KL_{167}	21 May 2015	OSSOS (568)	82	twotino	47.3	0.26	10	35.2	59.5	albedo: 0.126	MPC; JPL
2015 KL_{173}	21 May 2015	Maunakea (568)	51	plutino	39.3	0.33	10	26.5	52.2	albedo: 0.074	MPC; JPL
2015 KL_{174}	24 May 2015	Maunakea (568)	62	res · 3:5?	42.2	0.14	20	36.2	48.2	albedo: 0.126	MPC; JPL
2015 KL_{175}	21 May 2015	Maunakea (568)	122	cubewano (hot)	44.6	0.12	9	39.1	50.2	albedo: 0.079	MPC; JPL
2015 KL_{199}	24 May 2015	Maunakea (568)	83	cubewano (hot)	43.4	0.04	6	41.9	44.9	albedo: 0.079	MPC; JPL
2015 KL_{419}	21 May 2015	Subaru Telescope (T09)	191	cubewano (hot)?	40.4	0.04	16	38.7	42.0	albedo: 0.079	MPC; JPL
2015 KM_{167}	21 May 2015	OSSOS (568)	62	twotino	47.5	0.33	9	31.8	63.2	albedo: 0.126	MPC; JPL
2015 KM_{173}	24 May 2015	Maunakea (568)	89	plutino	39.4	0.23	8	30.3	48.4	albedo: 0.074	MPC; JPL
2015 KM_{174}	24 May 2015	Maunakea (568)	82	res · 3:5?	42.1	0.21	14	33.2	51.1	albedo: 0.126	MPC; JPL
2015 KM_{175}	21 May 2015	Maunakea (568)	99	cubewano (hot)	46.3	0.08	8	42.7	50.0	albedo: 0.079	MPC; JPL
2015 KM_{199}	24 May 2015	Maunakea (568)	67	plutino	39.4	0.19	7	32.0	46.7	albedo: 0.074	MPC; JPL
2015 KM_{419}	17 May 2015	Subaru Telescope (T09)	167	centaur	49.9	0.42	16	29.1	70.7	albedo: 0.058	MPC; JPL
2015 KN_{166}	17 May 2015	Maunakea (568)	97	centaur	38.0	0.28	24	27.5	48.4	albedo: 0.058	MPC; JPL
2015 KN_{173}	24 May 2015	Maunakea (568)	107	plutino	39.4	0.19	8	31.9	46.9	albedo: 0.074	MPC; JPL
2015 KN_{174}	21 May 2015	Maunakea (568)	113	cubewano (hot)?	45.6	0.20	11	36.6	54.5	albedo: 0.079	MPC; JPL
2015 KN_{175}	21 May 2015	Maunakea (568)	192	cubewano (hot)?	47.1	0.12	13	41.4	52.8	albedo: 0.079	MPC; JPL
2015 KN_{199}	24 May 2015	Maunakea (568)	78	cubewano (cold)	44.9	0.05	5	42.7	47.1	albedo: 0.152	MPC; JPL
2015 KN_{419}	21 May 2015	Subaru Telescope (T09)	71	other TNO	40.6	0.02	28	39.8	41.3	albedo: 0.13	MPC; JPL
2015 KO_{162}	27 May 2015	DECam (W84)	—	—	63.6	0.51	2	31.0	96.2	—	MPC; JPL
2015 KO_{166}	17 May 2015	Maunakea (568)	55	plutino	39.1	0.24	17	29.7	48.5	albedo: 0.074	MPC; JPL
2015 KO_{173}	24 May 2015	Maunakea (568)	85	plutino	39.3	0.19	13	31.8	46.9	albedo: 0.074	MPC; JPL
2015 KO_{174}	24 May 2015	Maunakea (568)	88	res · 2:7	69.1	0.52	8	33.0	105.1	albedo: 0.126	MPC; JPL
2015 KO_{175}	21 May 2015	Maunakea (568)	84	other TNO	40.3	0.09	31	36.7	43.9	albedo: 0.13	MPC; JPL
2015 KO_{360}	20 May 2015	DECam (W84)	186	SDO	61.0	0.41	6	35.9	86.2	albedo: 0.124	MPC; JPL
2015 KO_{419}	23 May 2015	Subaru Telescope (T09)	131	SDO	57.1	0.36	15	36.3	77.8	albedo: 0.124	MPC; JPL
2015 KP_{161}	27 May 2015	DECam (W84)	165	cubewano (hot)?	43.7	0.10	6	39.2	48.2	albedo: 0.079	MPC; JPL
2015 KP_{173}	24 May 2015	Maunakea (568)	71	plutino	39.2	0.22	7	30.5	47.9	albedo: 0.074	MPC; JPL
2015 KP_{174}	21 May 2015	Maunakea (568)	67	other TNO	38.7	0.07	7	36.1	41.3	albedo: 0.13	MPC; JPL
2015 KP_{175}	21 May 2015	Maunakea (568)	118	cubewano (hot)	44.7	0.12	11	39.2	50.1	albedo: 0.079	MPC; JPL
2015 KP_{178}	21 May 2015	DECam (W84)	—	—	44.1	0.08	2	40.4	47.8	—	MPC; JPL
2015 KQ_{161}	27 May 2015	DECam (W84)	84	cubewano (cold)?	44.6	0.10	3	40.1	49.1	albedo: 0.152	MPC; JPL
2015 KQ_{166}	17 May 2015	Maunakea (568)	99	centaur	38.3	0.28	24	27.5	49.2	albedo: 0.058	MPC; JPL
2015 KQ_{173}	24 May 2015	Maunakea (568)	81	plutino	39.2	0.26	39	29.2	49.2	albedo: 0.074	MPC; JPL
2015 KQ174	24 May 2015	Maunakea (568)	128	other TNO	54.9	0.11	24	48.6	61.1	albedo: 0.13	MPC; JPL
2015 KQ_{175}	21 May 2015	Maunakea (568)	78	cubewano (hot)	42.8	0.10	13	38.5	47.1	albedo: 0.079	MPC; JPL
2015 KQ_{459}	17 May 2015	Subaru Telescope (T09)	89	other TNO	37.0	0.11	15	33.0	41.0	albedo: 0.13	MPC; JPL
2015 KR_{166}	17 May 2015	Maunakea (568)	102	plutino	39.3	0.08	15	36.1	42.5	albedo: 0.074	MPC; JPL
2015 KR_{173}	24 May 2015	Maunakea (568)	97	plutino	39.2	0.12	7	34.7	43.7	albedo: 0.074	MPC; JPL
2015 KR_{174}	21 May 2015	Maunakea (568)	15	centaur	88.4	0.87	39	11.2	165.6	albedo: 0.058	MPC; JPL
2015 KR_{175}	21 May 2015	Maunakea (568)	113	cubewano (hot)	43.9	0.10	16	39.4	48.4	albedo: 0.079	MPC; JPL
2015 KS_{173}	24 May 2015	Maunakea (568)	54	plutino	39.2	0.18	31	32.1	46.4	albedo: 0.074	MPC; JPL
2015 KS_{174}	24 May 2015	Maunakea (568)	42	centaur	32.4	0.23	7	25.1	39.7	albedo: 0.058	MPC; JPL
2015 KS_{175}	24 May 2015	Maunakea (568)	119	cubewano (hot)	45.2	0.11	8	40.4	50.0	albedo: 0.079	MPC; JPL
2015 KT_{173}	24 May 2015	Maunakea (568)	67	plutino	39.4	0.24	7	29.8	49.0	albedo: 0.074	MPC; JPL
2015 KT_{174}	21 May 2015	Maunakea (568)	66	SDO	52.1	0.27	28	37.8	66.3	albedo: 0.124	MPC; JPL
2015 KT_{175}	24 May 2015	Maunakea (568)	137	cubewano (hot)	45.2	0.07	7	42.0	48.3	albedo: 0.079	MPC; JPL
2015 KU_{173}	24 May 2015	Maunakea (568)	107	plutino	39.3	0.21	14	31.0	47.5	albedo: 0.074	MPC; JPL
2015 KU_{174}	21 May 2015	Maunakea (568)	57	SDO	78.9	0.53	9	36.9	120.8	albedo: 0.124	MPC; JPL
2015 KU_{175}	24 May 2015	Maunakea (568)	99	cubewano (hot)	43.8	0.05	7	41.8	45.8	albedo: 0.079	MPC; JPL
2015 KU_{178}	21 May 2015	DECam (W84)	161	other TNO	40.2	0.10	21	36.0	44.4	albedo: 0.13	MPC; JPL
2015 KU_{186}	18 May 2015	Maunakea (568)	119	cubewano (hot)?	46.5	0.21	20	36.7	56.4	albedo: 0.079	MPC; JPL
2015 KU_{418}	26 May 2015	Subaru Telescope (T09)	95	other TNO	50.5	0.31	18	35.1	65.9	albedo: 0.13	MPC; JPL
2015 KV_{167}	18 May 2015	S. S. Sheppard (568)	137	SDO	51.4	0.27	27	37.5	65.3	albedo: 0.124	MPC; JPL
2015 KV_{173}	24 May 2015	Maunakea (568)	77	plutino	39.4	0.17	7	32.6	46.2	albedo: 0.074	MPC; JPL
2015 KV_{174}	21 May 2015	Maunakea (568)	72	SDO	51.8	0.30	23	36.4	67.2	albedo: 0.124	MPC; JPL
2015 KV_{175}	24 May 2015	Maunakea (568)	175	cubewano (hot)?	45.3	0.16	19	38.1	52.5	albedo: 0.079	MPC; JPL
2015 KV_{190}	18 May 2015	Maunakea (568)	114	other TNO	55.2	0.10	20	49.4	61.0	albedo: 0.13	MPC; JPL
2015 KW_{161}	27 May 2015	DECam (W84)	—	—	43.4	0.04	4	41.6	45.3	—	MPC; JPL
2015 KW_{173}	24 May 2015	Maunakea (568)	62	plutino	39.3	0.20	20	31.5	47.1	albedo: 0.074	MPC; JPL
2015 KW_{175}	24 May 2015	Maunakea (568)	90	cubewano (hot)	46.1	0.15	6	39.4	52.8	albedo: 0.079	MPC; JPL
2015 KW_{498}	17 May 2015	Canada-France-Hawaii Telescope (T14)	—	—	43.5	0.10	6	39.1	47.9	—	MPC; JPL
2015 KX_{173}	21 May 2015	Maunakea (568)	78	twotino	47.7	0.24	16	36.5	58.9	albedo: 0.126	MPC; JPL
2015 KX_{174}	21 May 2015	Maunakea (568)	120	SDO	51.7	0.27	12	37.6	65.9	albedo: 0.124	MPC; JPL
2015 KX_{175}	24 May 2015	Maunakea (568)	108	cubewano (hot)	45.6	0.08	6	42.1	49.0	albedo: 0.079	MPC; JPL
2015 KY_{162}	27 May 2015	DECam (W84)	146	centaur	38.3	0.11	26	34.0	42.7	albedo: 0.058	MPC; JPL
2015 KY_{173}	21 May 2015	Maunakea (568)	65	res · 1:3	62.2	0.43	9	35.4	89.1	albedo: 0.126	MPC; JPL
2015 KY_{174}	21 May 2015	Maunakea (568)	114	SDO	54.0	0.34	20	35.7	72.4	albedo: 0.124	MPC; JPL
2015 KY_{175}	24 May 2015	Maunakea (568)	119	cubewano (hot)	44.4	0.05	8	42.3	46.4	albedo: 0.079	MPC; JPL
2015 KY_{418}	21 May 2015	Subaru Telescope (T09)	85	SDO	55.2	0.44	15	30.9	79.4	albedo: 0.124	MPC; JPL
2015 KZ_{173}	21 May 2015	Maunakea (568)	45	res · 1:4	75.3	0.59	21	30.8	119.8	albedo: 0.126	MPC; JPL
2015 KZ_{174}	24 May 2015	Maunakea (568)	62	twotino?	48.2	0.30	15	33.9	62.5	albedo: 0.126	MPC; JPL
2015 KZ_{175}	24 May 2015	Maunakea (568)	157	cubewano (hot)?	46.8	0.20	19	37.7	56.0	albedo: 0.079	MPC; JPL
2015 ML_{150}	23 June 2015	Maunakea (568)	113	cubewano (hot)	43.7	0.04	7	41.8	45.6	albedo: 0.079	MPC; JPL
2015 NA_{46}	15 July 2015	Subaru Telescope (T09)	37	other TNO	40.8	0.10	25	36.6	45.1	albedo: 0.13	MPC; JPL
2015 NB_{45}	15 July 2015	Subaru Telescope (T09)	55	SDO	147.3	0.77	13	33.3	261.2	albedo: 0.124	MPC; JPL
2015 NB_{54}	12 July 2015	Subaru Telescope (T09)	48	SDO	54.1	0.38	14	33.8	74.4	albedo: 0.124	MPC; JPL
2015 NC_{44}	15 July 2015	Subaru Telescope (T09)	43	SDO	122.5	0.69	9	38.0	206.9	albedo: 0.124	MPC; JPL
2015 NC_{45}	15 July 2015	Subaru Telescope (T09)	68	other TNO	68.8	0.35	39	44.5	93.0	albedo: 0.13	MPC; JPL
2015 ND_{44}	15 July 2015	Subaru Telescope (T09)	81	SDO	113.5	0.62	11	42.8	184.2	albedo: 0.124	MPC; JPL
2015 ND_{45}	15 July 2015	Subaru Telescope (T09)	76	SDO	59.4	0.32	10	40.2	78.7	albedo: 0.124	MPC; JPL
2015 ND_{55}	15 July 2015	Subaru Telescope (T09)	57	other TNO	35.0	0.10	26	31.6	38.4	albedo: 0.13	MPC; JPL
2015 NE_{44}	15 July 2015	Subaru Telescope (T09)	93	cubewano (hot)?	49.7	0.10	12	44.6	54.8	albedo: 0.079	MPC; JPL
2015 NL_{45}	15 July 2015	Subaru Telescope (T09)	72	plutino?	39.4	0.04	10	38.0	40.8	albedo: 0.074	MPC; JPL
2015 NP_{45}	15 July 2015	Subaru Telescope (T09)	104	cubewano (hot)?	45.4	0.20	8	36.2	54.6	albedo: 0.079	MPC; JPL
2015 NQ_{45}	15 July 2015	Subaru Telescope (T09)	63	other TNO	38.9	0.19	27	31.5	46.3	albedo: 0.13	MPC; JPL
2015 NR_{45}	15 July 2015	Subaru Telescope (T09)	31	other TNO	48.0	0.53	26	22.7	73.2	albedo: 0.13	MPC; JPL
2015 NS_{61}	—	—	—	—	78.2	0.45	3	42.7	113.7	—	MPC; JPL
2015 NT_{61}	—	—	—	—	43.1	0.10	2.7	38.6	47.5	—	MPC; JPL
2015 NU_{61}	—	—	—	—	46.4	0.05	2.1	43.8	48.9	—	MPC; JPL
2015 NX_{43}	15 July 2015	Subaru Telescope (T09)	47	other TNO	37.4	0.26	10	27.8	47.1	albedo: 0.13	MPC; JPL
2015 NY_{45}	15 July 2015	Subaru Telescope (T09)	136	centaur	55.7	0.50	18	28.0	83.3	albedo: 0.058	MPC; JPL
2015 NY_{53}	15 July 2015	Subaru Telescope (T09)	61	other TNO	35.1	0.10	30	31.4	38.7	albedo: 0.13	MPC; JPL
2015 NZ_{42}	15 July 2015	Subaru Telescope (T09)	106	other TNO	46.9	0.24	22	35.6	58.2	albedo: 0.13	MPC; JPL
2015 NZ_{45}	15 July 2015	Subaru Telescope (T09)	128	other TNO	62.0	0.46	38	33.6	90.3	albedo: 0.13	MPC; JPL
2015 OA_{191}	21 July 2015	Subaru Telescope (T09)	106	other TNO	50.6	0.10	21	45.4	55.9	albedo: 0.13	MPC; JPL
2015 OB_{193}	21 July 2015	Subaru Telescope (T09)	63	other TNO	46.6	0.32	10	31.7	61.5	albedo: 0.13	MPC; JPL
2015 OB_{203}	20 July 2015	Subaru Telescope (T09)	104	SDO	188.5	0.82	15	33.4	343.7	albedo: 0.124	MPC; JPL
2015 OC_{192}	22 July 2015	Subaru Telescope (T09)	102	other TNO	45.0	0.11	10	40.1	49.9	albedo: 0.13	MPC; JPL
2015 OC_{193}	21 July 2015	Subaru Telescope (T09)	48	SDO	200.8	0.83	13	34.5	367.1	albedo: 0.124	MPC; JPL
2015 OC_{203}	20 July 2015	Subaru Telescope (T09)	80	cubewano (hot)?	41.6	0.05	11	39.6	43.7	albedo: 0.079	MPC; JPL
2015 OD_{203}	20 July 2015	Subaru Telescope (T09)	58	SDO	64.6	0.45	13	35.7	93.4	albedo: 0.124	MPC; JPL
2015 OE_{203}	20 July 2015	Subaru Telescope (T09)	95	cubewano (hot)?	44.1	0.14	15	37.9	50.3	albedo: 0.079	MPC; JPL
2015 OF_{193}	21 July 2015	Subaru Telescope (T09)	50	other TNO	48.5	0.26	8	35.7	61.3	albedo: 0.13	MPC; JPL
2015 OF_{203}	20 July 2015	Subaru Telescope (T09)	64	other TNO	42.3	0.24	13	32.4	52.3	albedo: 0.13	MPC; JPL
2015 OG_{193}	21 July 2015	Subaru Telescope (T09)	59	centaur	43.8	0.34	34	29.1	58.5	albedo: 0.058	MPC; JPL
2015 OH_{193}	21 July 2015	Subaru Telescope (T09)	53	other TNO	40.4	0.08	24	37.4	43.5	albedo: 0.13	MPC; JPL
2015 OJ_{190}	21 July 2015	Subaru Telescope (T09)	37	other TNO	40.6	0.10	21	36.6	44.6	albedo: 0.13	MPC; JPL
2015 OJ_{204}	20 July 2015	Subaru Telescope (T09)	94	cubewano (hot)?	41.1	0.10	37	36.9	45.4	albedo: 0.079	MPC; JPL
2015 OK_{194}	21 July 2015	Subaru Telescope (T09)	48	SDO	135.3	0.73	8	36.9	233.7	albedo: 0.124	MPC; JPL
2015 OL_{194}	22 July 2015	Subaru Telescope (T09)	93	SDO	61.7	0.43	23	35.0	88.3	albedo: 0.124	MPC; JPL
2015 OM_{194}	21 July 2015	Subaru Telescope (T09)	109	cubewano (hot)?	47.1	0.10	13	42.2	52.0	albedo: 0.079	MPC; JPL
2015 OQ_{213}	—	—	—	—	40.3	0.11	19	36.1	44.5	—	MPC; JPL
2015 OR_{192}	22 July 2015	Subaru Telescope (T09)	52	other TNO	43.5	0.21	13	34.4	52.7	albedo: 0.13	MPC; JPL
2015 OS_{192}	21 July 2015	Subaru Telescope (T09)	64	SDO	45.3	0.15	11	38.5	52.2	albedo: 0.124	MPC; JPL
2015 OS_{208}	—	—	—	—	51.3	0.11	11	45.8	56.7	—	MPC; JPL
2015 OS_{209}	—	—	—	—	42.6	0.17	27	35.5	49.8	—	MPC; JPL
2015 OT_{208}	—	—	—	—	47.8	0.19	17	38.6	57.1	—	MPC; JPL
2015 OU_{213}	—	—	—	—	93.6	0.58	4.4	39.5	147.8	—	MPC; JPL
2015 OV_{208}	—	—	—	—	38.4	0.10	28	34.6	42.2	—	MPC; JPL
2015 OV_{213}	—	—	—	—	37.5	0.10	37.5	33.8	41.2	—	MPC; JPL
2015 OW_{190}	21 July 2015	Subaru Telescope (T09)	50	SDO	76.8	0.49	12	39.3	114.3	albedo: 0.124	MPC; JPL
2015 OW_{208}	—	—	—	—	44.4	0.10	12	40.0	48.9	—	MPC; JPL
2015 OW_{213}	—	—	—	—	58.2	0.31	3.3	40.1	76.4	—	MPC; JPL
2015 OX_{190}	21 July 2015	Subaru Telescope (T09)	61	res · 3:4	36.6	0.12	12	32.3	40.8	albedo: 0.126	MPC; JPL
2015 OX_{208}	—	—	—	—	42.0	0.10	16	37.7	46.3	—	MPC; JPL
2015 OY_{190}	22 July 2015	Subaru Telescope (T09)	47	other TNO	43.5	0.18	27	35.6	51.4	albedo: 0.13	MPC; JPL
2015 OY_{203}	20 July 2015	Subaru Telescope (T09)	67	res · 4:7	43.6	0.19	11	35.5	51.7	albedo: 0.126	MPC; JPL
2015 OZ_{190}	21 July 2015	Subaru Telescope (T09)	139	cubewano (hot)?	43.0	0.10	13	38.7	47.2	albedo: 0.079	MPC; JPL
2015 PA_{376}	—	—	—	—	78.8	0.52	24	38.1	119.5	—	MPC; JPL
2015 PD_{312}	15 August 2015	DECam (W84)	94	res · 2:5	55.8	0.38	23	34.7	77.0	albedo: 0.126	MPC; JPL
2015 PK_{312}	15 August 2015	DECam (W84)	41	SDO	91.4	0.66	23	31.3	151.4	albedo: 0.124	MPC; JPL
2015 PL_{312}	15 August 2015	DECam (W84)	104	cubewano (hot)	42.1	0.14	26	36.2	48.0	albedo: 0.079	MPC; JPL
2015 PY_{330}	15 August 2015	Cerro Tololo Observatory (807)	317	cubewano (hot)?	43.7	0.20	7	34.8	52.7	albedo: 0.079	MPC; JPL
2015 PZ_{315}	15 August 2015	S. S. Sheppard (807)	191	centaur	83.3	0.66	4	28.2	138.5	albedo: 0.058	MPC; JPL
2015 PZ_{330}	15 August 2015	Cerro Tololo Observatory (807)	185	other TNO	38.6	0.05	28	36.9	40.4	albedo: 0.13	MPC; JPL
2015 QA_{34}	18 August 2015	DECam (W84)	84	SDO	65.3	0.46	25	35.1	95.5	albedo: 0.124	MPC; JPL
2015 QB_{34}	18 August 2015	DECam (W84)	118	other TNO	44.0	0.27	19	32.0	56.1	albedo: 0.13	MPC; JPL
2015 QC_{34}	19 August 2015	DECam (W84)	82	res · 2:5	56.1	0.37	22	35.2	76.9	albedo: 0.126	MPC; JPL
2015 QL_{14}	16 August 2015	S. S. Sheppard (807)	188	cubewano (hot)	43.5	0.12	12	38.4	48.5	binary: 126 km; albedo: 0.079	MPC; JPL
2015 QL_{34}	23 August 2015	DECam (W84)	124	res · 2:5	55.6	0.38	26	34.3	76.9	albedo: 0.126	MPC; JPL
2015 QT_{11}	19 August 2015	DECam (W84)	67	other TNO	38.7	0.05	27	36.7	40.7	albedo: 0.13	MPC; JPL
2015 QV_{33}	18 August 2015	DECam (W84)	81	res · 3:7	53.4	0.32	25	36.4	70.3	albedo: 0.126	MPC; JPL
2015 QW_{23}	18 August 2015	Cerro Tololo Observatory (807)	276	cubewano (hot)?	47.3	0.04	21	45.4	49.2	albedo: 0.079	MPC; JPL
2015 QW_{33}	23 August 2015	DECam (W84)	203	cubewano (hot)?	46.1	0.18	22	38.0	54.1	albedo: 0.079	MPC; JPL
2015 QX_{33}	19 August 2015	DECam (W84)	108	other TNO	40.7	0.09	25	36.9	44.4	albedo: 0.13	MPC; JPL
2015 QY_{33}	24 August 2015	DECam (W84)	154	cubewano (hot)	43.0	0.03	33	41.6	44.4	albedo: 0.079	MPC; JPL
2015 QZ_{33}	24 August 2015	DECam (W84)	154	SDO	55.0	0.32	29	37.4	72.7	albedo: 0.124	MPC; JPL
2015 RA_{278}	9 September 2015	Maunakea (568)	54	res · 1:3	62.7	0.43	11	35.9	89.4	albedo: 0.126	MPC; JPL
2015 RA_{279}	8 September 2015	Maunakea (568)	167	centaur	60.4	0.69	30	18.7	102.1	albedo: 0.058	MPC; JPL
2015 RA_{280}	8 September 2015	Maunakea (568)	103	cubewano (cold)	44.9	0.09	2	40.7	49.2	possible binary; albedo: 0.152	MPC; JPL
2015 RA_{281}	9 September 2015	Maunakea (568)	86	cubewano (hot)	42.8	0.05	9	40.7	45.0	albedo: 0.079	MPC; JPL
2015 RB_{278}	9 September 2015	Maunakea (568)	113	res · 1:4	75.8	0.44	28	42.6	109.0	albedo: 0.126	MPC; JPL
2015 RB_{279}	8 September 2015	Maunakea (568)	56	SDO	128.1	0.74	20	33.5	222.7	albedo: 0.124	MPC; JPL
2015 RB_{280}	8 September 2015	Maunakea (568)	101	cubewano (cold)	43.9	0.07	2	40.8	47.0	binary: 61 km; albedo: 0.152	MPC; JPL
2015 RB_{281}	9 September 2015	Maunakea (568)	102	cubewano (cold)	43.4	0.06	2	41.0	45.8	albedo: 0.152	MPC; JPL
2015 RC_{277}	9 September 2015	OSSOS (568)	119	cubewano (hot)?	46.5	0.16	24	39.1	53.9	albedo: 0.079	MPC; JPL
2015 RC_{278}	8 September 2015	Maunakea (568)	90	cubewano (cold)	43.8	0.09	5	40.0	47.6	albedo: 0.152	MPC; JPL
2015 RC_{279}	9 September 2015	Maunakea (568)	57	SDO	101.8	0.69	18	31.7	171.9	albedo: 0.124	MPC; JPL
2015 RC_{280}	8 September 2015	Maunakea (568)	54	cubewano (cold)	43.4	0.05	1	41.3	45.5	albedo: 0.152	MPC; JPL
2015 RC_{281}	9 September 2015	Maunakea (568)	108	cubewano (cold)	46.2	0.01	4	45.5	46.8	albedo: 0.152	MPC; JPL
2015 RD_{278}	8 September 2015	Maunakea (568)	59	res · 4:7	43.8	0.11	3	38.8	48.8	albedo: 0.126	MPC; JPL
2015 RD_{279}	9 September 2015	Maunakea (568)	52	SDO	51.2	0.40	15	30.8	71.6	albedo: 0.124	MPC; JPL
2015 RD_{280}	8 September 2015	Maunakea (568)	101	cubewano (cold)	44.7	0.11	2	40.0	49.4	albedo: 0.152	MPC; JPL
2015 RD_{281}	9 September 2015	Maunakea (568)	65	cubewano (hot)	41.4	0.11	18	36.9	46.0	albedo: 0.079	MPC; JPL
2015 RE_{278}	8 September 2015	Maunakea (568)	62	res · 4:7?	43.7	0.08	7	40.5	47.0	albedo: 0.126	MPC; JPL
2015 RE_{279}	9 September 2015	Maunakea (568)	83	SDO	58.1	0.43	14	33.0	83.1	albedo: 0.124	MPC; JPL
2015 RE_{280}	8 September 2015	Maunakea (568)	90	cubewano (cold)	44.4	0.04	1	42.6	46.2	albedo: 0.152	MPC; JPL
2015 RE_{281}	9 September 2015	Maunakea (568)	78	cubewano (hot)?	46.0	0.16	9	38.6	53.4	albedo: 0.079	MPC; JPL
2015 RF_{278}	9 September 2015	Maunakea (568)	86	res · 4:7	43.7	0.09	2	40.0	47.5	albedo: 0.126	MPC; JPL
2015 RF_{279}	9 September 2015	Maunakea (568)	75	other TNO	43.1	0.25	7	32.5	53.6	albedo: 0.13	MPC; JPL
2015 RF_{280}	8 September 2015	Maunakea (568)	82	cubewano (hot)	43.1	0.09	20	39.3	46.9	albedo: 0.079	MPC; JPL
2015 RF_{281}	9 September 2015	Maunakea (568)	150	cubewano (hot)?	46.2	0.18	8	38.0	54.4	albedo: 0.079	MPC; JPL
2015 RF_{301}	5 September 2015	Cerro Tololo Observatory (807)	165	cubewano (hot)?	45.0	0.16	12	37.8	52.3	albedo: 0.079	MPC; JPL
2015 RG_{278}	9 September 2015	Maunakea (568)	62	res · 4:7	43.8	0.17	4	36.3	51.2	albedo: 0.126	MPC; JPL
2015 RG_{279}	8 September 2015	Maunakea (568)	173	SDO	59.8	0.42	14	34.5	85.1	albedo: 0.124	MPC; JPL
2015 RG_{280}	8 September 2015	Maunakea (568)	62	cubewano (cold)	42.7	0.06	2	40.3	45.1	albedo: 0.152	MPC; JPL
2015 RG_{281}	9 September 2015	Maunakea (568)	99	cubewano (hot)?	46.4	0.23	9	35.9	56.8	albedo: 0.079	MPC; JPL
2015 RG_{301}	5 September 2015	Cerro Tololo Observatory (807)	84	other TNO	54.1	0.04	10	52.1	56.2	albedo: 0.13	MPC; JPL
2015 RH_{278}	8 September 2015	Maunakea (568)	136	res · 2:5	55.7	0.39	5	34.1	77.4	albedo: 0.126	MPC; JPL
2015 RH_{279}	9 September 2015	Maunakea (568)	69	SDO	71.4	0.47	10	37.9	104.8	albedo: 0.124	MPC; JPL
2015 RH_{280}	8 September 2015	Maunakea (568)	54	cubewano (cold)	45.1	0.11	2	40.1	50.1	albedo: 0.152	MPC; JPL
2015 RH_{281}	9 September 2015	Maunakea (568)	71	cubewano (cold)?	47.1	0.18	5	38.8	55.4	albedo: 0.152	MPC; JPL
2015 RJ_{277}	9 September 2015	OSSOS (568)	156	cubewano (hot)?	46.9	0.21	6	37.2	56.6	binary: 54 km; albedo: 0.079	MPC; JPL
2015 RJ_{278}	8 September 2015	Maunakea (568)	108	res · 3:5	42.2	0.16	5	35.7	48.8	albedo: 0.126	MPC; JPL
2015 RJ_{279}	9 September 2015	Maunakea (568)	48	SDO	56.8	0.34	30	37.7	75.8	albedo: 0.124	MPC; JPL
2015 RJ_{280}	8 September 2015	Maunakea (568)	75	cubewano (cold)	45.5	0.07	2	42.4	48.5	albedo: 0.152	MPC; JPL
2015 RJ_{281}	9 September 2015	Maunakea (568)	150	cubewano (hot)?	46.2	0.17	11	38.2	54.2	albedo: 0.079	MPC; JPL
2015 RK_{245}	13 September 2015	CSS (703)	8	damocloid	83.6	0.97	92	2.8	164.3	albedo: 0.048	MPC; JPL
2015 RK_{258}	5 September 2015	S. S. Sheppard (807)	143	SDO	72.4	0.51	9	35.8	108.9	albedo: 0.124	MPC; JPL
2015 RK_{278}	9 September 2015	Maunakea (568)	82	res · 3:5	42.4	0.15	10	35.9	48.8	albedo: 0.126	MPC; JPL
2015 RK_{280}	8 September 2015	Maunakea (568)	99	cubewano (hot)	45.5	0.06	24	42.9	48.0	albedo: 0.079	MPC; JPL
2015 RK_{281}	9 September 2015	Maunakea (568)	65	cubewano (cold)	44.4	0.08	2	41.0	47.9	albedo: 0.152	MPC; JPL
2015 RL_{258}	5 September 2015	S. S. Sheppard (807)	189	SDO	51.0	0.33	16	34.3	67.7	albedo: 0.124	MPC; JPL
2015 RL_{277}	9 September 2015	OSSOS (568)	2.9	centaur	34.8	0.85	3	5.2	64.3	albedo: 0.058	MPC; JPL
2015 RL_{278}	8 September 2015	Maunakea (568)	66	SDO	79.7	0.54	18	36.8	122.6	albedo: 0.124	MPC; JPL
2015 RL_{279}	8 September 2015	Maunakea (568)	52	cubewano (cold)	44.3	0.04	1	42.7	45.9	albedo: 0.152	MPC; JPL
2015 RL_{280}	9 September 2015	Maunakea (568)	65	cubewano (cold)	45.2	0.07	4	42.1	48.3	albedo: 0.152	MPC; JPL
2015 RL_{281}	9 September 2015	Maunakea (568)	58	other TNO	40.4	0.05	25	38.6	42.2	albedo: 0.13	MPC; JPL
2015 RM_{278}	8 September 2015	Maunakea (568)	94	cubewano (hot)?	45.9	0.19	22	37.3	54.5	albedo: 0.079	MPC; JPL
2015 RM_{279}	8 September 2015	Maunakea (568)	78	cubewano (cold)	44.2	0.06	0	41.4	47.0	albedo: 0.152	MPC; JPL
2015 RM_{280}	9 September 2015	Maunakea (568)	78	cubewano (cold)	45.7	0.06	4	42.9	48.5	albedo: 0.152	MPC; JPL
2015 RM_{281}	9 September 2015	Maunakea (568)	124	cubewano (hot)	45.9	0.15	11	39.1	52.6	albedo: 0.079	MPC; JPL
2015 RN_{279}	8 September 2015	Maunakea (568)	112	cubewano (hot)	42.9	0.11	16	38.2	47.7	albedo: 0.079	MPC; JPL
2015 RN_{280}	9 September 2015	Maunakea (568)	130	cubewano (hot)	41.4	0.13	20	36.2	46.6	albedo: 0.079	MPC; JPL
2015 RN_{281}	9 September 2015	Maunakea (568)	103	cubewano (hot)	42.6	0.13	40	37.1	48.1	albedo: 0.079	MPC; JPL
2015 RO_{278}	9 September 2015	Maunakea (568)	80	cubewano (hot)?	45.6	0.24	25	34.7	56.4	albedo: 0.079	MPC; JPL
2015 RO_{279}	8 September 2015	Maunakea (568)	71	cubewano (cold)	45.6	0.07	1	42.6	48.6	albedo: 0.152	MPC; JPL
2015 RO_{280}	9 September 2015	Maunakea (568)	72	cubewano (hot)	41.5	0.05	35	39.6	43.4	albedo: 0.079	MPC; JPL
2015 RO_{281}	9 September 2015	Maunakea (568)	108	cubewano (cold)?	44.0	0.17	2	36.4	51.7	binary: 40 km; albedo: 0.152	MPC; JPL
2015 RP_{278}	9 September 2015	Maunakea (568)	68	res · 7:12	43.3	0.17	7	36.0	50.6	albedo: 0.126	MPC; JPL
2015 RP_{279}	8 September 2015	Maunakea (568)	74	cubewano (cold)	44.2	0.06	2	41.5	46.9	albedo: 0.152	MPC; JPL
2015 RP_{280}	9 September 2015	Maunakea (568)	118	cubewano (cold)	45.5	0.09	4	41.3	49.6	binary: 71 km; albedo: 0.152	MPC; JPL
2015 RP_{281}	9 September 2015	Maunakea (568)	98	cubewano (cold)	45.0	0.11	3	39.9	50.2	albedo: 0.152	MPC; JPL
2015 RQ_{278}	9 September 2015	Maunakea (568)	99	cubewano (hot)	46.1	0.10	18	41.3	50.9	albedo: 0.079	MPC; JPL
2015 RQ_{279}	8 September 2015	Maunakea (568)	82	cubewano (cold)?	46.8	0.17	3	38.9	54.7	albedo: 0.152	MPC; JPL
2015 RQ_{280}	9 September 2015	Maunakea (568)	59	cubewano (cold)	44.1	0.05	2	42.1	46.1	albedo: 0.152	MPC; JPL
2015 RQ_{281}	5 September 2015	Cerro Tololo Observatory (807)	165	SDO	119.7	0.69	19	36.6	202.9	albedo: 0.124	MPC; JPL
2015 RR_{277}	8 September 2015	Maunakea (568)	130	plutino	39.4	0.24	8	30.0	48.8	albedo: 0.074	MPC; JPL
2015 RR_{278}	9 September 2015	Maunakea (568)	43	res · 4:5	34.9	0.10	3	31.5	38.2	albedo: 0.126	MPC; JPL
2015 RR_{279}	8 September 2015	Maunakea (568)	62	cubewano (cold)	44.3	0.08	1	40.7	47.9	albedo: 0.152	MPC; JPL
2015 RR_{280}	9 September 2015	Maunakea (568)	106	cubewano (hot)	41.6	0.07	33	38.6	44.5	albedo: 0.079	MPC; JPL
2015 RR_{281}	8 September 2015	Maunakea (568)	62	cubewano (cold)	44.3	0.07	2	41.2	47.5	albedo: 0.152	MPC; JPL
2015 RS_{245}	12 September 2015	DECam (W84)	82	other TNO	40.6	0.09	16	36.8	44.4	albedo: 0.13	MPC; JPL
2015 RS_{277}	8 September 2015	Maunakea (568)	74	plutino	39.5	0.18	4	32.3	46.7	albedo: 0.074	MPC; JPL
2015 RS_{278}	9 September 2015	Maunakea (568)	68	res · 5:12	54.3	0.42	14	31.7	76.8	albedo: 0.126	MPC; JPL
2015 RS_{279}	8 September 2015	Maunakea (568)	86	cubewano (cold)	44.3	0.04	1	42.6	46.0	albedo: 0.152	MPC; JPL
2015 RS_{280}	9 September 2015	Maunakea (568)	82	cubewano (hot)	41.4	0.03	32	40.0	42.8	albedo: 0.079	MPC; JPL
2015 RS_{281}	9 September 2015	Maunakea (568)	57	res · 4:13	66.1	0.41	39	38.8	93.4	albedo: 0.126	MPC; JPL
2015 RT_{245}	8 September 2015	OSSOS (568)	152	cubewano (cold)	44.5	0.08	1	40.8	48.1	binary: 104 km; albedo: 0.152; taxonomy: RR	MPC; JPL
2015 RT_{277}	8 September 2015	Maunakea (568)	97	plutino	39.6	0.17	6	32.8	46.3	albedo: 0.074	MPC; JPL
2015 RT_{278}	9 September 2015	Maunakea (568)	70	other TNO	45.2	0.20	18	36.3	54.2	albedo: 0.13	MPC; JPL
2015 RT_{279}	8 September 2015	Maunakea (568)	78	cubewano (cold)	43.9	0.03	2	42.4	45.3	albedo: 0.152	MPC; JPL
2015 RT_{280}	9 September 2015	Maunakea (568)	86	cubewano (hot)	41.5	0.05	11	39.4	43.5	albedo: 0.079	MPC; JPL
2015 RU_{245}	8 September 2015	OSSOS (568)	76	centaur	31.2	0.29	14	22.0	40.4	albedo: 0.058; taxonomy: IR	MPC; JPL
2015 RU_{277}	9 September 2015	Maunakea (568)	76	plutino	39.5	0.25	16	29.5	49.5	albedo: 0.074	MPC; JPL
2015 RU_{278}	9 September 2015	Maunakea (568)	150	SDO	51.1	0.25	27	38.3	63.8	albedo: 0.124	MPC; JPL
2015 RU_{279}	8 September 2015	Maunakea (568)	86	cubewano (hot)	46.4	0.14	5	40.1	52.6	albedo: 0.079	MPC; JPL
2015 RU_{280}	9 September 2015	Maunakea (568)	59	cubewano (cold)?	47.2	0.12	2	41.6	52.8	albedo: 0.152	MPC; JPL
2015 RV_{277}	9 September 2015	Maunakea (568)	112	plutino	39.4	0.16	6	33.0	45.8	albedo: 0.074	MPC; JPL
2015 RV_{278}	9 September 2015	Maunakea (568)	79	SDO	50.5	0.28	9	36.5	64.5	albedo: 0.124	MPC; JPL
2015 RV_{279}	8 September 2015	Maunakea (568)	75	cubewano (cold)	45.6	0.14	2	39.3	51.9	albedo: 0.152	MPC; JPL
2015 RV_{280}	9 September 2015	Maunakea (568)	62	cubewano (hot)	42.9	0.12	11	37.8	48.0	albedo: 0.079	MPC; JPL
2015 RV_{334}	9 September 2015	Maunakea (568)	43	res · 3:11	71.9	0.52	12	34.8	109.0	albedo: 0.126	MPC; JPL
2015 RW_{245}	9 September 2015	OSSOS (568)	95	centaur	57.0	0.54	13	26.5	87.5	albedo: 0.058	MPC; JPL
2015 RW_{277}	9 September 2015	Maunakea (568)	50	nep trj	30.1	0.08	31	27.8	32.5	albedo: 0.058	MPC; JPL
2015 RW_{278}	8 September 2015	Maunakea (568)	61	other TNO	37.9	0.05	2	35.9	40.0	albedo: 0.13	MPC; JPL
2015 RW_{279}	8 September 2015	Maunakea (568)	78	cubewano (cold)	44.0	0.08	2	40.6	47.4	albedo: 0.152	MPC; JPL
2015 RW_{280}	9 September 2015	Maunakea (568)	99	cubewano (hot)	41.4	0.14	32	35.7	47.2	albedo: 0.079	MPC; JPL
2015 RX245	8 September 2015	OSSOS (568)	217	EDDO	446.6	0.90	12	45.5	847.7	albedo: 0.124	MPC; JPL
2015 RX_{277}	8 September 2015	Maunakea (568)	98	twotino	47.8	0.21	0	37.8	57.8	albedo: 0.126	MPC; JPL
2015 RX_{278}	8 September 2015	Maunakea (568)	86	other TNO	37.8	0.07	24	35.3	40.3	albedo: 0.13	MPC; JPL
2015 RX_{279}	8 September 2015	Maunakea (568)	86	cubewano (hot)	43.3	0.05	16	41.3	45.2	albedo: 0.079	MPC; JPL
2015 RX_{280}	9 September 2015	Maunakea (568)	164	cubewano (hot)	44.0	0.13	23	38.1	49.9	albedo: 0.079	MPC; JPL
2015 RX_{345}	4 September 2015	DECam (W84)	142	cubewano (hot)	41.9	0.05	15	39.9	44.0	albedo: 0.079	MPC; JPL
2015 RY_{245}	9 September 2015	OSSOS (568)	63	SDO	227.8	0.86	6	31.4	424.2	albedo: 0.124	MPC; JPL
2015 RY_{277}	9 September 2015	Maunakea (568)	90	twotino	47.5	0.28	4	34.4	60.6	albedo: 0.126	MPC; JPL
2015 RY_{278}	8 September 2015	Maunakea (568)	78	cubewano (cold)	39.0	0.06	1	36.7	41.3	albedo: 0.152	MPC; JPL
2015 RY_{279}	8 September 2015	Maunakea (568)	95	cubewano (hot)?	44.9	0.18	18	37.0	52.8	albedo: 0.079	MPC; JPL
2015 RY_{280}	9 September 2015	Maunakea (568)	143	cubewano (hot)	46.5	0.14	17	39.9	53.1	albedo: 0.079	MPC; JPL
2015 RY_{345}	13 September 2015	DECam (W84)	122	other TNO	40.3	0.06	35	37.8	42.8	albedo: 0.13	MPC; JPL
2015 RZ_{277}	8 September 2015	Maunakea (568)	163	res · 1:3	62.1	0.44	6	34.7	89.5	albedo: 0.126	MPC; JPL
2015 RZ_{278}	8 September 2015	Maunakea (568)	63	SDO	72.5	0.54	12	33.6	111.3	albedo: 0.124	MPC; JPL
2015 RZ_{279}	8 September 2015	Maunakea (568)	103	cubewano (cold)	43.6	0.07	4	40.6	46.6	albedo: 0.152	MPC; JPL
2015 RZ_{280}	9 September 2015	Maunakea (568)	94	cubewano (hot)	44.0	0.13	12	38.1	50.0	albedo: 0.079	MPC; JPL
2015 SA_{57}	23 September 2015	Pan-STARRS 1 (F51)	57	centaur	559.4	0.97	45	15.6	1103.2	albedo: 0.058	MPC; JPL
2015 SO_{21}	17 September 2015	Calar Alto TNO Survey (Z79)	173	SDO	60.1	0.35	23	38.8	81.4	albedo: 0.124	MPC; JPL
2015 SP_{20}	17 September 2015	Calar Alto TNO Survey (Z79)	201	cubewano (cold)	44.9	0.11	3	39.9	49.8	albedo: 0.152	MPC; JPL
2015 SP_{21}	19 September 2015	Calar Alto TNO Survey (Z79)	159	centaur	32.4	0.11	38	29.0	35.9	albedo: 0.058	MPC; JPL
2015 SV_{20}	20 September 2015	Calar Alto TNO Survey (Z79)	82	res · 4:5	35.1	0.15	7	29.8	40.4	albedo: 0.126	MPC; JPL
2015 SW_{20}	17 September 2015	Calar Alto TNO Survey (Z79)	178	cubewano (cold)?	43.7	0.08	1	40.3	47.1	albedo: 0.152	MPC; JPL
2015 SZ_{49}	23 September 2015	DECam (W84)	134	cubewano (hot)?	45.7	0.17	28	37.9	53.5	albedo: 0.079	MPC; JPL
2015 TA_{361}	10 October 2015	Maunakea (568)	164	cubewano (hot)	43.0	0.09	5	39.3	46.8	albedo: 0.079	MPC; JPL
2015 TC_{361}	10 October 2015	Maunakea (568)	141	plutino	39.4	0.11	6	35.1	43.6	albedo: 0.074	MPC; JPL
2015 TF_{362}	10 October 2015	Maunakea (568)	114	SDO	69.7	0.48	29	36.0	103.5	albedo: 0.124	MPC; JPL
2015 TG_{362}	10 October 2015	Maunakea (568)	153	cubewano (hot)	44.4	0.09	6	40.3	48.4	albedo: 0.079	MPC; JPL
2015 TG_{363}	10 October 2015	Maunakea (568)	124	cubewano (hot)?	46.1	0.07	16	42.9	49.3	albedo: 0.079	MPC; JPL
2015 TG_{367}	13 October 2015	S. S. Sheppard (568)	131	SDO	52.1	0.27	9	38.1	66.1	albedo: 0.124	MPC; JPL
2015 TH367	13 October 2015	S. S. Sheppard (568)	273	centaur	78.7	0.62	11	29.7	127.6	albedo: 0.058	MPC; JPL
2015 TJ_{361}	10 October 2015	Maunakea (568)	136	cubewano (hot)	45.4	0.05	8	43.4	47.4	albedo: 0.079	MPC; JPL
2015 TJ_{363}	10 October 2015	Maunakea (568)	156	other TNO	46.4	0.19	14	37.8	55.0	albedo: 0.13; taxonomy: RR	MPC; JPL
2015 TJ_{367}	13 October 2015	S. S. Sheppard (568)	173	SDO	81.2	0.58	29	34.0	128.4	albedo: 0.124	MPC; JPL
2015 TK_{363}	10 October 2015	Maunakea (568)	172	cubewano (hot)	41.0	0.07	15	38.4	43.7	albedo: 0.079; taxonomy: RR	MPC; JPL
2015 TL_{361}	10 October 2015	Maunakea (568)	114	res · 4:7	43.8	0.17	11	36.5	51.2	albedo: 0.126	MPC; JPL
2015 TN_{178}	8 October 2015	Pan-STARRS 1 (F51)	5	damocloid	54.4	0.96	91	2.4	106.3	albedo: 0.048	MPC; JPL
2015 TN_{363}	10 October 2015	Maunakea (568)	52	SDO	57.4	0.36	31	36.7	78.2	albedo: 0.124	MPC; JPL
2015 TO_{363}	10 October 2015	Maunakea (568)	88	other TNO	42.9	0.34	15	28.3	57.6	albedo: 0.13	MPC; JPL
2015 TP_{361}	10 October 2015	Maunakea (568)	141	plutino	39.5	0.13	10	34.4	44.6	albedo: 0.074	MPC; JPL
2015 TP_{362}	10 October 2015	Maunakea (568)	142	SDO	72.3	0.49	38	37.2	107.5	albedo: 0.124; taxonomy: RR	MPC; JPL
2015 TP_{363}	10 October 2015	Maunakea (568)	134	other TNO	53.3	0.27	39	39.2	67.4	albedo: 0.13	MPC; JPL
2015 TP_{454}	7 October 2015	DECam (W84)	228	centaur	67.4	0.59	24	27.7	107.0	albedo: 0.058	MPC; JPL
2015 TQ_{363}	10 October 2015	Maunakea (568)	62	other TNO	47.3	0.19	27	38.3	56.2	albedo: 0.13	MPC; JPL
2015 TQ_{408}	13 October 2015	Maunakea (568)	118	plutino	39.6	0.27	14	28.9	50.3	albedo: 0.074	MPC; JPL
2015 TQ_{454}	7 October 2015	DECam (W84)	90	SDO	51.7	0.27	32	37.7	65.7	albedo: 0.124	MPC; JPL
2015 TR_{361}	10 October 2015	Maunakea (568)	78	res · 4:5	35.0	0.10	6	31.5	38.4	albedo: 0.126	MPC; JPL
2015 TR_{362}	10 October 2015	Maunakea (568)	86	res · 4:7	44.0	0.16	7	36.9	51.1	albedo: 0.126	MPC; JPL
2015 TS_{350}	15 October 2015	Pan-STARRS 1 (F51)	13	centaur	140.2	0.96	58	5.1	275.3	albedo: 0.058	MPC; JPL
2015 TS_{363}	10 October 2015	Maunakea (568)	74	res · 2:5	55.7	0.44	15	31.0	80.4	albedo: 0.126	MPC; JPL
2015 TT_{363}	10 October 2015	Maunakea (568)	47	SDO	63.5	0.46	16	34.1	92.9	albedo: 0.124	MPC; JPL
2015 TV_{361}	10 October 2015	Maunakea (568)	95	SDO	89.8	0.58	25	37.9	141.7	albedo: 0.124	MPC; JPL
2015 TW_{361}	10 October 2015	Maunakea (568)	130	res · 2:7	69.7	0.47	17	36.9	102.6	albedo: 0.126; taxonomy: IR	MPC; JPL
2015 TX_{363}	10 October 2015	Maunakea (568)	141	cubewano (hot)?	40.5	0.02	17	39.6	41.3	albedo: 0.079	MPC; JPL
2015 TY_{360}	10 October 2015	Maunakea (568)	161	res · 2:5	55.6	0.43	10	31.9	79.3	albedo: 0.126	MPC; JPL
2015 UH_{87}	16 October 2015	S. S. Sheppard (304)	234	res · 1:3	62.5	0.45	12	34.2	90.8	albedo: 0.126	MPC; JPL
2015 UK_{84}	17 October 2015	DECam (W84)	173	other TNO	49.8	0.24	24	37.8	61.7	albedo: 0.13	MPC; JPL
2015 UN_{105}	23 October 2015	DECam (W84)	124	SDO	187.4	0.78	37	41.5	333.3	albedo: 0.124	MPC; JPL
2015 UN_{116}	—	—	—	—	45.8	0.10	19	41.0	50.5	—	MPC; JPL
2015 UO_{105}	17 October 2015	DECam (W84)	90	SDO	51.6	0.29	52	36.5	66.7	albedo: 0.124	MPC; JPL
2015 VA_{164}	6 November 2015	OSSOS (568)	172	cubewano (hot)	46.0	0.07	25	42.9	49.1	albedo: 0.079	MPC; JPL
2015 VA_{165}	6 November 2015	Maunakea (568)	49	plutino	39.8	0.28	14	28.6	51.0	albedo: 0.074	MPC; JPL
2015 VA_{166}	6 November 2015	Maunakea (568)	62	twotino	48.0	0.42	13	27.9	68.2	albedo: 0.126	MPC; JPL
2015 VA_{167}	7 November 2015	Maunakea (568)	113	res · 4:7?	44.0	0.10	11	39.6	48.4	albedo: 0.126	MPC; JPL
2015 VA_{168}	6 November 2015	Maunakea (568)	76	SDO	72.9	0.53	6	33.9	111.8	albedo: 0.124	MPC; JPL
2015 VA_{169}	6 November 2015	Maunakea (568)	82	cubewano (cold)	44.1	0.05	2	42.2	46.1	possible binary; albedo: 0.152	MPC; JPL
2015 VA_{170}	6 November 2015	Maunakea (568)	68	cubewano (cold)	43.7	0.05	2	41.6	45.8	albedo: 0.152	MPC; JPL
2015 VA_{171}	7 November 2015	Maunakea (568)	57	cubewano (cold)	43.2	0.04	1	41.6	44.8	albedo: 0.152	MPC; JPL
2015 VA_{172}	7 November 2015	Maunakea (568)	104	cubewano (cold)	44.5	0.07	3	41.2	47.7	albedo: 0.152	MPC; JPL
2015 VA_{173}	7 November 2015	Maunakea (568)	78	cubewano (cold)	43.3	0.01	2	42.7	43.8	albedo: 0.152	MPC; JPL
2015 VB_{164}	6 November 2015	OSSOS (568)	130	cubewano (hot)	45.1	0.08	25	41.4	48.9	albedo: 0.079	MPC; JPL
2015 VB_{165}	6 November 2015	Maunakea (568)	67	plutino	39.9	0.21	3	31.7	48.1	albedo: 0.074	MPC; JPL
2015 VB_{166}	6 November 2015	Maunakea (568)	60	twotino	48.1	0.33	1	32.1	64.1	albedo: 0.126	MPC; JPL
2015 VB_{167}	7 November 2015	Maunakea (568)	62	res · 4:7?	43.9	0.07	3	40.6	47.2	albedo: 0.126	MPC; JPL
2015 VB_{168}	6 November 2015	Maunakea (568)	173	SDO	100.3	0.65	4	34.9	165.7	albedo: 0.124	MPC; JPL
2015 VB_{169}	6 November 2015	Maunakea (568)	103	cubewano (cold)	44.2	0.08	2	40.9	47.6	albedo: 0.152	MPC; JPL
2015 VB_{170}	6 November 2015	Maunakea (568)	107	cubewano (cold)	44.0	0.02	3	43.4	44.7	possible binary; albedo: 0.152	MPC; JPL
2015 VB_{171}	7 November 2015	Maunakea (568)	98	cubewano (cold)	44.0	0.07	2	40.8	47.3	albedo: 0.152	MPC; JPL
2015 VB_{173}	7 November 2015	Maunakea (568)	78	cubewano (cold)	42.8	0.02	3	41.7	43.8	albedo: 0.152	MPC; JPL
2015 VB_{208}	6 November 2015	DECam (W84)	86	SDO	91.8	0.63	36	34.4	149.2	albedo: 0.124	MPC; JPL
2015 VC_{164}	7 November 2015	OSSOS (568)	62	cubewano (hot)	45.6	0.14	26	39.0	52.1	albedo: 0.079	MPC; JPL
2015 VC_{165}	7 November 2015	Maunakea (568)	56	plutino	39.6	0.10	13	35.5	43.7	albedo: 0.074	MPC; JPL
2015 VC_{166}	7 November 2015	Maunakea (568)	59	twotino	48.5	0.25	3	36.5	60.5	albedo: 0.126	MPC; JPL
2015 VC_{167}	7 November 2015	Maunakea (568)	78	res · 4:7	44.0	0.15	4	37.6	50.4	albedo: 0.126	MPC; JPL
2015 VC_{168}	7 November 2015	Maunakea (568)	53	other TNO	44.6	0.28	8	31.9	57.3	albedo: 0.13	MPC; JPL
2015 VC_{169}	6 November 2015	Maunakea (568)	68	cubewano (cold)?	43.8	0.18	3	36.0	51.6	albedo: 0.152	MPC; JPL
2015 VC_{170}	6 November 2015	Maunakea (568)	106	cubewano (cold)	43.8	0.05	2	41.5	46.2	albedo: 0.152	MPC; JPL
2015 VC_{171}	7 November 2015	Maunakea (568)	71	cubewano (cold)	44.7	0.06	4	42.0	47.3	albedo: 0.152	MPC; JPL
2015 VC_{172}	7 November 2015	Maunakea (568)	150	cubewano (cold)?	46.9	0.13	4	40.6	53.2	albedo: 0.152	MPC; JPL
2015 VC_{173}	7 November 2015	Maunakea (568)	68	cubewano (cold)	43.3	0.04	2	41.8	44.8	albedo: 0.152	MPC; JPL
2015 VD_{157}	7 November 2015	OSSOS (568)	54	twotino	48.2	0.32	1	32.9	63.4	albedo: 0.126	MPC; JPL
2015 VD_{164}	7 November 2015	OSSOS (568)	94	cubewano (hot)	46.1	0.07	28	42.7	49.5	albedo: 0.079	MPC; JPL
2015 VD_{165}	7 November 2015	Maunakea (568)	97	plutino	39.8	0.23	12	30.8	48.8	albedo: 0.074	MPC; JPL
2015 VD_{166}	7 November 2015	Maunakea (568)	52	twotino	48.0	0.36	2	30.7	65.4	albedo: 0.126	MPC; JPL
2015 VD_{167}	6 November 2015	Maunakea (568)	57	res · 2:5	55.9	0.42	16	32.6	79.2	albedo: 0.126	MPC; JPL
2015 VD_{168}	7 November 2015	Maunakea (568)	132	centaur	116.5	0.78	23	25.8	207.1	albedo: 0.058	MPC; JPL
2015 VD_{169}	6 November 2015	Maunakea (568)	82	cubewano (cold)	43.0	0.06	2	40.4	45.6	albedo: 0.152	MPC; JPL
2015 VD_{170}	6 November 2015	Maunakea (568)	161	cubewano (hot)?	45.9	0.15	10	38.9	52.8	albedo: 0.079	MPC; JPL
2015 VD_{171}	7 November 2015	Maunakea (568)	68	cubewano (cold)	46.8	0.11	3	41.6	52.1	albedo: 0.152	MPC; JPL
2015 VD_{172}	7 November 2015	Maunakea (568)	113	cubewano (hot)	42.4	0.12	5	37.2	47.5	albedo: 0.079	MPC; JPL
2015 VD_{173}	7 November 2015	Maunakea (568)	59	cubewano (cold)	44.6	0.08	2	41.2	48.1	albedo: 0.152	MPC; JPL
2015 VE_{165}	7 November 2015	Maunakea (568)	59	plutino	39.8	0.22	1	31.3	48.4	albedo: 0.074	MPC; JPL
2015 VE_{166}	7 November 2015	Maunakea (568)	52	twotino	48.2	0.22	4	37.8	58.6	albedo: 0.126	MPC; JPL
2015 VE_{167}	6 November 2015	Maunakea (568)	52	res · 2:5	55.9	0.39	30	34.0	77.8	albedo: 0.126	MPC; JPL
2015 VE_{168}	7 November 2015	Maunakea (568)	72	SDO	69.4	0.49	2	35.2	103.5	albedo: 0.124	MPC; JPL
2015 VE_{169}	6 November 2015	Maunakea (568)	90	cubewano (cold)	44.6	0.04	3	43.0	46.1	albedo: 0.152	MPC; JPL
2015 VE_{170}	6 November 2015	Maunakea (568)	105	cubewano (hot)	42.8	0.14	10	37.0	48.6	albedo: 0.079	MPC; JPL
2015 VE_{171}	7 November 2015	Maunakea (568)	86	cubewano (cold)	44.2	0.09	2	40.4	48.1	albedo: 0.152	MPC; JPL
2015 VE_{172}	7 November 2015	Maunakea (568)	71	cubewano (cold)	44.0	0.06	4	41.3	46.8	albedo: 0.152	MPC; JPL
2015 VE_{173}	7 November 2015	Maunakea (568)	75	cubewano (cold)	44.9	0.08	2	41.2	48.7	albedo: 0.152	MPC; JPL
2015 VF_{165}	7 November 2015	Maunakea (568)	102	plutino	39.6	0.35	23	25.8	53.4	albedo: 0.074	MPC; JPL
2015 VF_{166}	7 November 2015	Maunakea (568)	62	twotino	48.2	0.32	2	32.7	63.7	albedo: 0.126	MPC; JPL
2015 VF_{167}	7 November 2015	Maunakea (568)	75	res · 2:5	56.0	0.28	37	40.4	71.5	albedo: 0.126	MPC; JPL
2015 VF_{168}	7 November 2015	Maunakea (568)	48	centaur	41.4	0.31	35	28.7	54.1	albedo: 0.058	MPC; JPL
2015 VF_{169}	6 November 2015	Maunakea (568)	86	cubewano (cold)	44.0	0.06	3	41.6	46.5	albedo: 0.152	MPC; JPL
2015 VF_{170}	6 November 2015	Maunakea (568)	82	cubewano (cold)	43.0	0.02	2	42.1	44.0	albedo: 0.152	MPC; JPL
2015 VF_{171}	7 November 2015	Maunakea (568)	112	cubewano (hot)	43.0	0.10	18	38.5	47.4	albedo: 0.079	MPC; JPL
2015 VF_{172}	7 November 2015	Maunakea (568)	65	cubewano (cold)	43.7	0.03	3	42.5	44.9	albedo: 0.152	MPC; JPL
2015 VF_{173}	7 November 2015	Maunakea (568)	75	cubewano (cold)	43.6	0.06	2	40.8	46.4	albedo: 0.152	MPC; JPL
2015 VG_{157}	7 November 2015	S. S. Sheppard (568)	117	other TNO	54.2	0.27	38	39.4	69.0	albedo: 0.13	MPC; JPL
2015 VG_{165}	7 November 2015	Maunakea (568)	79	plutino	39.6	0.22	10	30.8	48.4	albedo: 0.074	MPC; JPL
2015 VG_{166}	7 November 2015	Maunakea (568)	59	twotino	48.1	0.21	17	37.9	58.4	albedo: 0.126	MPC; JPL
2015 VG_{167}	6 November 2015	Maunakea (568)	86	res · 3:5	42.6	0.26	5	31.7	53.6	albedo: 0.126	MPC; JPL
2015 VG_{168}	7 November 2015	Maunakea (568)	286	SDO	65.2	0.47	14	34.7	95.7	albedo: 0.124	MPC; JPL
2015 VG_{169}	6 November 2015	Maunakea (568)	82	cubewano (cold)	46.8	0.06	2	44.1	49.6	albedo: 0.152	MPC; JPL
2015 VG_{170}	6 November 2015	Maunakea (568)	78	cubewano (cold)	42.3	0.08	1	38.9	45.7	albedo: 0.152	MPC; JPL
2015 VG_{171}	7 November 2015	Maunakea (568)	78	cubewano (hot)	42.8	0.01	6	42.2	43.4	albedo: 0.079	MPC; JPL
2015 VG_{172}	7 November 2015	Maunakea (568)	65	cubewano (cold)	44.2	0.08	3	40.5	48.0	albedo: 0.152	MPC; JPL
2015 VG_{173}	7 November 2015	Maunakea (568)	71	cubewano (cold)	44.4	0.07	3	41.4	47.5	albedo: 0.152	MPC; JPL
2015 VH_{165}	7 November 2015	Maunakea (568)	83	plutino	39.7	0.16	14	33.4	46.1	albedo: 0.074	MPC; JPL
2015 VH_{166}	7 November 2015	Maunakea (568)	52	twotino	48.2	0.32	3	32.7	63.7	albedo: 0.126	MPC; JPL
2015 VH_{167}	7 November 2015	Maunakea (568)	98	res · 3:5	42.5	0.14	1	36.5	48.5	albedo: 0.126	MPC; JPL
2015 VH_{168}	6 November 2015	Maunakea (568)	117	SDO	49.1	0.26	16	36.5	61.7	albedo: 0.124	MPC; JPL
2015 VH_{169}	6 November 2015	Maunakea (568)	68	cubewano (cold)	43.1	0.03	3	41.8	44.4	albedo: 0.152	MPC; JPL
2015 VH_{170}	6 November 2015	Maunakea (568)	71	cubewano (cold)	45.1	0.07	1	42.0	48.2	albedo: 0.152	MPC; JPL
2015 VH_{171}	7 November 2015	Maunakea (568)	98	cubewano (cold)	45.2	0.11	3	40.4	49.9	albedo: 0.152	MPC; JPL
2015 VH_{172}	7 November 2015	Maunakea (568)	65	cubewano (cold)	44.1	0.07	3	41.2	47.1	albedo: 0.152	MPC; JPL
2015 VH_{173}	7 November 2015	Maunakea (568)	83	cubewano (cold)	44.1	0.09	2	40.0	48.2	albedo: 0.152	MPC; JPL
2015 VJ_{164}	6 November 2015	Maunakea (568)	130	plutino	39.5	0.20	6	31.6	47.4	albedo: 0.074	MPC; JPL
2015 VJ_{165}	7 November 2015	Maunakea (568)	107	plutino	39.5	0.11	6	35.0	43.9	albedo: 0.074	MPC; JPL
2015 VJ_{166}	7 November 2015	Maunakea (568)	52	twotino	48.0	0.30	4	33.6	62.3	albedo: 0.126	MPC; JPL
2015 VJ_{167}	7 November 2015	Maunakea (568)	86	res · 3:5	42.5	0.21	4	33.6	51.4	albedo: 0.126	MPC; JPL
2015 VJ_{168}	6 November 2015	Maunakea (568)	261	SDO	59.7	0.36	10	38.2	81.3	albedo: 0.124	MPC; JPL
2015 VJ_{169}	6 November 2015	Maunakea (568)	68	cubewano (cold)	43.2	0.07	3	40.3	46.0	albedo: 0.152	MPC; JPL
2015 VJ_{170}	6 November 2015	Maunakea (568)	82	cubewano (cold)	43.1	0.04	5	41.4	44.8	albedo: 0.152	MPC; JPL
2015 VJ_{171}	7 November 2015	Maunakea (568)	78	cubewano (hot)?	46.6	0.17	22	38.6	54.6	albedo: 0.079	MPC; JPL
2015 VJ_{172}	7 November 2015	Maunakea (568)	68	cubewano (cold)	44.2	0.09	1	40.4	48.0	albedo: 0.152	MPC; JPL
2015 VJ_{173}	7 November 2015	Maunakea (568)	108	cubewano (hot)	43.5	0.15	23	36.9	50.2	albedo: 0.079	MPC; JPL
2015 VJ_{181}	6 November 2015	DECam (W84)	181	cubewano (hot)?	42.7	0.18	37	34.9	50.5	albedo: 0.079; taxonomy: BR	MPC; JPL
2015 VK_{164}	6 November 2015	Maunakea (568)	60	plutino	39.5	0.25	2	29.5	49.5	albedo: 0.074	MPC; JPL
2015 VK_{165}	7 November 2015	Maunakea (568)	43	plutino	39.8	0.26	3	29.6	50.1	albedo: 0.074	MPC; JPL
2015 VK_{166}	7 November 2015	Maunakea (568)	111	twotino	48.3	0.21	2	38.4	58.2	albedo: 0.126	MPC; JPL
2015 VK_{167}	7 November 2015	Maunakea (568)	49	res · 3:5	42.5	0.27	12	31.2	53.8	albedo: 0.126	MPC; JPL
2015 VK_{168}	6 November 2015	Maunakea (568)	102	SDO	59.4	0.35	14	38.5	80.3	albedo: 0.124	MPC; JPL
2015 VK_{169}	6 November 2015	Maunakea (568)	78	cubewano (cold)	44.0	0.06	2	41.6	46.4	albedo: 0.152	MPC; JPL
2015 VK_{170}	6 November 2015	Maunakea (568)	113	cubewano (cold)	43.6	0.04	2	41.7	45.5	albedo: 0.152	MPC; JPL
2015 VK_{171}	7 November 2015	Maunakea (568)	94	cubewano (hot)	43.4	0.07	5	40.5	46.3	albedo: 0.079	MPC; JPL
2015 VK_{172}	7 November 2015	Maunakea (568)	39	cubewano (cold)	46.3	0.14	2	39.9	52.7	albedo: 0.152	MPC; JPL
2015 VK_{173}	7 November 2015	Maunakea (568)	124	cubewano (hot)	43.9	0.06	12	41.5	46.3	albedo: 0.079	MPC; JPL
2015 VL_{164}	6 November 2015	Maunakea (568)	45	plutino	39.6	0.24	12	30.0	49.2	albedo: 0.074	MPC; JPL
2015 VL_{165}	7 November 2015	Maunakea (568)	131	plutino	39.7	0.16	23	33.2	46.3	albedo: 0.074	MPC; JPL
2015 VL_{166}	7 November 2015	Maunakea (568)	36	twotino	48.3	0.33	6	32.4	64.1	albedo: 0.126	MPC; JPL
2015 VL_{167}	6 November 2015	Maunakea (568)	45	res · 3:4	36.7	0.15	11	31.2	42.3	albedo: 0.126	MPC; JPL
2015 VL_{168}	7 November 2015	Maunakea (568)	227	SDO	88.9	0.57	16	37.8	140.0	albedo: 0.124	MPC; JPL
2015 VL_{169}	6 November 2015	Maunakea (568)	139	cubewano (hot)	45.1	0.11	7	40.3	49.9	albedo: 0.079	MPC; JPL
2015 VL_{170}	6 November 2015	Maunakea (568)	94	cubewano (hot)?	40.3	0.06	27	37.7	42.9	albedo: 0.079	MPC; JPL
2015 VL_{171}	7 November 2015	Maunakea (568)	98	cubewano (cold)?	47.1	0.05	2	44.9	49.3	albedo: 0.152	MPC; JPL
2015 VL_{172}	7 November 2015	Maunakea (568)	47	cubewano (cold)	43.9	0.12	4	38.8	48.9	albedo: 0.152	MPC; JPL
2015 VL_{173}	7 November 2015	Maunakea (568)	68	cubewano (cold)	44.9	0.08	2	41.3	48.4	albedo: 0.152	MPC; JPL
2015 VM_{164}	6 November 2015	Maunakea (568)	51	plutino	39.5	0.26	18	29.4	49.6	albedo: 0.074	MPC; JPL
2015 VM_{165}	7 November 2015	Maunakea (568)	47	plutino	39.8	0.21	7	31.3	48.2	albedo: 0.074	MPC; JPL
2015 VM_{166}	7 November 2015	Maunakea (568)	82	res · 1:3	63.5	0.44	1	35.3	91.8	albedo: 0.126	MPC; JPL
2015 VM_{167}	6 November 2015	Maunakea (568)	41	res · 3:4	36.6	0.21	4	28.9	44.3	albedo: 0.126	MPC; JPL
2015 VM_{168}	7 November 2015	Maunakea (568)	45	SDO	64.1	0.41	14	37.6	90.6	albedo: 0.124	MPC; JPL
2015 VM_{169}	6 November 2015	Maunakea (568)	77	other TNO	40.9	0.01	28	40.5	41.2	albedo: 0.13	MPC; JPL
2015 VM_{170}	6 November 2015	Maunakea (568)	103	cubewano (hot)	45.6	0.14	6	39.4	51.7	albedo: 0.079	MPC; JPL
2015 VM_{171}	7 November 2015	Maunakea (568)	75	cubewano (cold)	44.2	0.10	2	39.9	48.6	albedo: 0.152	MPC; JPL
2015 VM_{172}	7 November 2015	Maunakea (568)	68	cubewano (cold)	46.1	0.08	2	42.4	49.9	albedo: 0.152	MPC; JPL
2015 VM_{173}	7 November 2015	Maunakea (568)	185	cubewano (cold)	44.1	0.05	2	42.0	46.3	binary: 121 km; albedo: 0.152	MPC; JPL
2015 VN_{164}	6 November 2015	Maunakea (568)	89	plutino	39.7	0.24	9	30.0	49.4	albedo: 0.074	MPC; JPL
2015 VN_{165}	7 November 2015	Maunakea (568)	49	plutino	39.5	0.23	4	30.3	48.8	albedo: 0.074	MPC; JPL
2015 VN_{166}	7 November 2015	Maunakea (568)	54	res · 1:3	63.1	0.48	6	32.7	93.6	albedo: 0.126	MPC; JPL
2015 VN_{167}	7 November 2015	Maunakea (568)	82	res · 3:4	36.7	0.08	4	33.8	39.6	albedo: 0.126	MPC; JPL
2015 VN_{168}	7 November 2015	Maunakea (568)	125	SDO	61.6	0.40	20	37.0	86.2	albedo: 0.124	MPC; JPL
2015 VN_{169}	6 November 2015	Maunakea (568)	103	cubewano (hot)	42.7	0.03	6	41.5	44.0	albedo: 0.079	MPC; JPL
2015 VN_{170}	6 November 2015	Maunakea (568)	124	cubewano (hot)	41.9	0.11	16	37.3	46.5	albedo: 0.079	MPC; JPL
2015 VN_{171}	7 November 2015	Maunakea (568)	82	cubewano (cold)	44.0	0.03	3	42.8	45.1	albedo: 0.152	MPC; JPL
2015 VN_{172}	7 November 2015	Maunakea (568)	101	cubewano (cold)	45.9	0.05	2	43.8	48.0	albedo: 0.152	MPC; JPL
2015 VN_{173}	7 November 2015	Maunakea (568)	103	cubewano (hot)	42.9	0.05	5	40.9	45.0	albedo: 0.079	MPC; JPL
2015 VO_{164}	6 November 2015	Maunakea (568)	80	plutino	39.9	0.31	14	27.6	52.1	albedo: 0.074	MPC; JPL
2015 VO_{165}	7 November 2015	Maunakea (568)	93	plutino	39.8	0.22	10	31.2	48.4	albedo: 0.074	MPC; JPL
2015 VO_{166}	6 November 2015	Maunakea (568)	247	res · 1:4	75.8	0.49	11	38.9	112.7	albedo: 0.126	MPC; JPL
2015 VO_{167}	6 November 2015	Maunakea (568)	86	SDO	59.3	0.41	18	35.1	83.5	albedo: 0.124	MPC; JPL
2015 VO_{168}	7 November 2015	Maunakea (568)	91	SDO	54.2	0.30	5	38.2	70.1	albedo: 0.124	MPC; JPL
2015 VO_{169}	6 November 2015	Maunakea (568)	82	cubewano (cold)	45.9	0.11	4	40.6	51.1	albedo: 0.152	MPC; JPL
2015 VO_{170}	6 November 2015	Maunakea (568)	86	cubewano (cold)	44.2	0.03	3	42.7	45.6	albedo: 0.152	MPC; JPL
2015 VO_{171}	7 November 2015	Maunakea (568)	98	cubewano (cold)	44.3	0.06	3	41.8	46.8	albedo: 0.152	MPC; JPL
2015 VO_{172}	7 November 2015	Maunakea (568)	99	cubewano (hot)	43.6	0.12	9	38.4	48.9	albedo: 0.079	MPC; JPL
2015 VO_{173}	7 November 2015	Maunakea (568)	75	cubewano (hot)?	45.1	0.15	21	38.2	52.0	albedo: 0.079	MPC; JPL
2015 VO_{202}	6 November 2015	Maunakea (568)	85	plutino	39.4	0.24	3	29.9	49.0	albedo: 0.074	MPC; JPL
2015 VP_{164}	6 November 2015	Maunakea (568)	81	plutino	39.4	0.25	5	29.5	49.4	albedo: 0.074	MPC; JPL
2015 VP_{165}	7 November 2015	Maunakea (568)	60	plutino	39.7	0.34	15	26.2	53.2	albedo: 0.074	MPC; JPL
2015 VP_{166}	7 November 2015	Maunakea (568)	86	SDO	75.7	0.53	21	35.9	115.5	albedo: 0.124	MPC; JPL
2015 VP_{167}	6 November 2015	Maunakea (568)	67	other TNO	40.9	0.12	22	36.0	45.7	albedo: 0.13	MPC; JPL
2015 VP_{168}	6 November 2015	Maunakea (568)	90	cubewano (cold)	45.7	0.01	2	45.5	46.0	possible binary; albedo: 0.152	MPC; JPL
2015 VP_{169}	6 November 2015	Maunakea (568)	78	cubewano (cold)	42.9	0.05	4	40.7	45.1	albedo: 0.152	MPC; JPL
2015 VP_{170}	6 November 2015	Maunakea (568)	113	cubewano (hot)	46.4	0.14	6	40.2	52.6	albedo: 0.079	MPC; JPL
2015 VP_{171}	7 November 2015	Maunakea (568)	71	cubewano (cold)	43.6	0.05	4	41.4	45.8	albedo: 0.152	MPC; JPL
2015 VP_{172}	7 November 2015	Maunakea (568)	113	cubewano (cold)	45.6	0.14	4	39.2	51.9	albedo: 0.152	MPC; JPL
2015 VP_{173}	7 November 2015	Maunakea (568)	94	cubewano (cold)	44.1	0.05	3	41.8	46.5	albedo: 0.152	MPC; JPL
2015 VP_{202}	6 November 2015	Maunakea (568)	58	SDO	54.1	0.29	3	38.6	69.7	albedo: 0.124	MPC; JPL
2015 VQ_{164}	6 November 2015	Maunakea (568)	54	plutino	39.9	0.25	15	29.9	49.9	albedo: 0.074	MPC; JPL
2015 VQ_{165}	7 November 2015	Maunakea (568)	102	plutino	39.5	0.28	19	28.4	50.7	albedo: 0.074	MPC; JPL
2015 VQ_{166}	6 November 2015	Maunakea (568)	85	res · 4:7	43.9	0.05	2	41.8	45.9	albedo: 0.126	MPC; JPL
2015 VQ_{167}	7 November 2015	Maunakea (568)	79	SDO	86.8	0.56	29	38.0	135.5	albedo: 0.124	MPC; JPL
2015 VQ_{168}	6 November 2015	Maunakea (568)	84	cubewano (cold)	43.8	0.04	0	41.9	45.6	albedo: 0.152	MPC; JPL
2015 VQ_{169}	6 November 2015	Maunakea (568)	108	cubewano (cold)	44.1	0.03	1	42.9	45.3	possible binary; albedo: 0.152	MPC; JPL
2015 VQ_{170}	7 November 2015	Maunakea (568)	86	cubewano (hot)	42.8	0.15	11	36.5	49.1	albedo: 0.079	MPC; JPL
2015 VQ_{171}	7 November 2015	Maunakea (568)	108	cubewano (hot)	45.4	0.12	13	39.9	50.9	albedo: 0.079	MPC; JPL
2015 VQ_{172}	7 November 2015	Maunakea (568)	103	cubewano (cold)	44.0	0.04	1	42.4	45.7	albedo: 0.152	MPC; JPL
2015 VQ_{173}	7 November 2015	Maunakea (568)	98	cubewano (cold)	45.0	0.11	3	40.2	49.8	possible binary; albedo: 0.152	MPC; JPL
2015 VQ_{202}	6 November 2015	Maunakea (568)	65	cubewano (cold)	44.1	0.02	2	43.3	44.8	albedo: 0.152	MPC; JPL
2015 VQ_{207}	5 November 2015	DECam (W84)	62	SDO	149.8	0.79	29	31.4	268.1	albedo: 0.124	MPC; JPL
2015 VR_{164}	6 November 2015	Maunakea (568)	108	plutino	39.6	0.21	2	31.2	47.9	albedo: 0.074	MPC; JPL
2015 VR_{165}	7 November 2015	Maunakea (568)	89	plutino	39.7	0.05	13	37.8	41.6	albedo: 0.074	MPC; JPL
2015 VR_{166}	6 November 2015	Maunakea (568)	86	res · 4:7?	43.9	0.17	7	36.3	51.5	albedo: 0.126	MPC; JPL
2015 VR_{167}	7 November 2015	Maunakea (568)	82	res · 2:7	70.4	0.55	14	31.6	109.2	albedo: 0.126	MPC; JPL
2015 VR_{168}	6 November 2015	Maunakea (568)	94	cubewano (cold)	44.6	0.07	2	41.6	47.6	albedo: 0.152	MPC; JPL
2015 VR_{169}	6 November 2015	Maunakea (568)	119	cubewano (hot)	42.8	0.15	17	36.4	49.3	albedo: 0.079	MPC; JPL
2015 VR_{170}	7 November 2015	Maunakea (568)	68	cubewano (cold)	43.5	0.04	2	41.9	45.1	albedo: 0.152	MPC; JPL
2015 VR_{171}	7 November 2015	Maunakea (568)	103	cubewano (hot)	45.4	0.06	6	42.5	48.3	albedo: 0.079	MPC; JPL
2015 VR_{172}	7 November 2015	Maunakea (568)	129	cubewano (cold)	45.7	0.04	2	44.1	47.3	albedo: 0.152	MPC; JPL
2015 VR_{173}	7 November 2015	Maunakea (568)	62	cubewano (cold)	43.8	0.02	4	42.8	44.8	albedo: 0.152	MPC; JPL
2015 VR_{207}	6 November 2015	DECam (W84)	102	SDO	79.9	0.54	27	36.8	123.0	albedo: 0.124	MPC; JPL
2015 VS_{164}	6 November 2015	Maunakea (568)	93	plutino	39.6	0.16	21	33.3	46.0	albedo: 0.074	MPC; JPL
2015 VS_{165}	7 November 2015	Maunakea (568)	71	plutino	39.7	0.18	3	32.4	46.9	albedo: 0.074	MPC; JPL
2015 VS_{166}	6 November 2015	Maunakea (568)	118	res · 4:7	43.9	0.13	3	38.2	49.5	albedo: 0.126	MPC; JPL
2015 VS_{167}	7 November 2015	Maunakea (568)	60	SDO	81.6	0.52	7	39.2	124.0	albedo: 0.124	MPC; JPL
2015 VS_{168}	6 November 2015	Maunakea (568)	119	cubewano (cold)?	47.1	0.18	4	38.8	55.4	albedo: 0.152	MPC; JPL
2015 VS_{169}	6 November 2015	Maunakea (568)	62	cubewano (cold)	43.6	0.04	1	41.9	45.3	albedo: 0.152	MPC; JPL
2015 VS_{170}	7 November 2015	Maunakea (568)	94	cubewano (hot)	41.7	0.02	18	40.7	42.6	albedo: 0.079	MPC; JPL
2015 VS_{171}	7 November 2015	Maunakea (568)	71	cubewano (cold)	44.4	0.07	3	41.2	47.6	albedo: 0.152	MPC; JPL
2015 VS_{172}	7 November 2015	Maunakea (568)	98	cubewano (cold)	46.5	0.04	1	44.5	48.5	albedo: 0.152	MPC; JPL
2015 VS_{173}	7 November 2015	Maunakea (568)	94	cubewano (hot)	45.8	0.13	12	39.8	51.8	albedo: 0.079	MPC; JPL
2015 VS_{207}	6 November 2015	DECam (W84)	91	res · 1:5	88.6	0.60	1	35.1	142.1	albedo: 0.126	MPC; JPL
2015 VS_{227}	14 November 2015	Subaru Telescope (T09)	70	other TNO	40.2	0.06	17	38.0	42.5	albedo: 0.13	MPC; JPL
2015 VT_{164}	6 November 2015	Maunakea (568)	67	plutino	39.5	0.26	7	29.2	49.7	albedo: 0.074	MPC; JPL
2015 VT_{165}	7 November 2015	Maunakea (568)	49	plutino	39.6	0.28	14	28.5	50.8	albedo: 0.074	MPC; JPL
2015 VT_{166}	6 November 2015	Maunakea (568)	94	res · 4:7	44.0	0.21	8	34.9	53.1	albedo: 0.126	MPC; JPL
2015 VT_{167}	7 November 2015	Maunakea (568)	64	other TNO	50.7	0.20	6	40.9	60.6	albedo: 0.13	MPC; JPL
2015 VT_{168}	6 November 2015	Maunakea (568)	148	cubewano (cold)	45.6	0.04	1	43.7	47.4	binary: 70 km; albedo: 0.152	MPC; JPL
2015 VT_{169}	6 November 2015	Maunakea (568)	68	cubewano (cold)	44.1	0.08	1	40.6	47.6	albedo: 0.152	MPC; JPL
2015 VT_{170}	7 November 2015	Maunakea (568)	86	cubewano (cold)	43.7	0.02	1	42.7	44.6	albedo: 0.152	MPC; JPL
2015 VT_{171}	7 November 2015	Maunakea (568)	62	cubewano (cold)	43.6	0.05	2	41.4	45.7	albedo: 0.152	MPC; JPL
2015 VT_{172}	7 November 2015	Maunakea (568)	62	cubewano (cold)	44.6	0.05	1	42.5	46.7	albedo: 0.152	MPC; JPL
2015 VT_{173}	7 November 2015	Maunakea (568)	52	cubewano (cold)	43.5	0.04	4	41.8	45.1	albedo: 0.152	MPC; JPL
2015 VT_{207}	7 November 2015	DECam (W84)	89	SDO	53.2	0.32	37	36.4	70.0	albedo: 0.124	MPC; JPL
2015 VT_{227}	8 November 2015	Subaru Telescope (T09)	118	cubewano (hot)?	42.2	0.11	26	37.5	46.9	albedo: 0.079	MPC; JPL
2015 VU_{164}	6 November 2015	Maunakea (568)	133	plutino	39.7	0.14	37	34.3	45.1	albedo: 0.074	MPC; JPL
2015 VU_{165}	7 November 2015	Maunakea (568)	74	plutino	39.5	0.17	5	33.0	46.1	albedo: 0.074	MPC; JPL
2015 VU_{166}	6 November 2015	Maunakea (568)	103	res · 4:7	43.9	0.08	4	40.3	47.6	albedo: 0.126	MPC; JPL
2015 VU_{167}	7 November 2015	Maunakea (568)	123	cubewano (cold)?	46.6	0.18	5	38.3	54.9	albedo: 0.152	MPC; JPL
2015 VU_{168}	6 November 2015	Maunakea (568)	86	cubewano (cold)	44.6	0.08	1	41.2	48.0	albedo: 0.152	MPC; JPL
2015 VU_{169}	6 November 2015	Maunakea (568)	103	cubewano (cold)	42.7	0.03	2	41.6	43.9	albedo: 0.152	MPC; JPL
2015 VU_{170}	7 November 2015	Maunakea (568)	57	cubewano (cold)	43.0	0.03	2	41.5	44.4	albedo: 0.152	MPC; JPL
2015 VU_{171}	7 November 2015	Maunakea (568)	108	cubewano (cold)	43.9	0.02	3	42.8	44.9	albedo: 0.152	MPC; JPL
2015 VU_{172}	7 November 2015	Maunakea (568)	102	plutino?	39.8	0.02	2	38.9	40.6	albedo: 0.074	MPC; JPL
2015 VU_{207}	1 November 2015	DECam (W84)	195	nep trj	30.2	0.04	39	29.1	31.3	albedo: 0.058	MPC; JPL
2015 VV_{164}	6 November 2015	Maunakea (568)	93	plutino	39.8	0.10	2	36.0	43.6	albedo: 0.074	MPC; JPL
2015 VV_{165}	6 November 2015	Maunakea (568)	87	nep trj	30.3	0.09	17	27.6	33.1	albedo: 0.058	MPC; JPL
2015 VV_{166}	6 November 2015	Maunakea (568)	98	res · 4:7	43.9	0.08	3	40.6	47.3	albedo: 0.126	MPC; JPL
2015 VV_{167}	7 November 2015	Maunakea (568)	86	cubewano (hot)?	44.5	0.15	12	37.8	51.2	albedo: 0.079	MPC; JPL
2015 VV_{168}	6 November 2015	Maunakea (568)	59	cubewano (cold)	45.8	0.07	2	42.7	48.8	albedo: 0.152	MPC; JPL
2015 VV_{169}	6 November 2015	Maunakea (568)	98	cubewano (cold)	43.2	0.07	3	40.0	46.4	albedo: 0.152	MPC; JPL
2015 VV_{170}	7 November 2015	Maunakea (568)	59	cubewano (cold)	43.5	0.03	1	42.3	44.6	albedo: 0.152	MPC; JPL
2015 VV_{171}	7 November 2015	Maunakea (568)	54	cubewano (cold)?	46.2	0.18	3	38.0	54.5	albedo: 0.152	MPC; JPL
2015 VV_{172}	7 November 2015	Maunakea (568)	139	cubewano (hot)?	42.8	0.17	20	35.7	50.0	albedo: 0.079	MPC; JPL
2015 VV_{207}	7 November 2015	DECam (W84)	79	res · 2:5	55.9	0.41	29	33.0	78.9	albedo: 0.126	MPC; JPL
2015 VV_{227}	8 November 2015	Subaru Telescope (T09)	58	twotino	48.0	0.24	15	36.6	59.4	albedo: 0.126	MPC; JPL
2015 VW_{164}	6 November 2015	Maunakea (568)	106	plutino	39.7	0.16	1	33.3	46.1	albedo: 0.074	MPC; JPL
2015 VW_{165}	6 November 2015	Maunakea (568)	116	nep trj	30.3	0.05	5	28.7	31.9	albedo: 0.058	MPC; JPL
2015 VW_{166}	7 November 2015	Maunakea (568)	59	res · 4:7	43.9	0.10	2	39.7	48.2	albedo: 0.126	MPC; JPL
2015 VW_{167}	6 November 2015	Maunakea (568)	74	other TNO	38.3	0.01	1	37.8	38.8	albedo: 0.13	MPC; JPL
2015 VW_{168}	6 November 2015	Maunakea (568)	82	cubewano (cold)	42.9	0.04	2	41.3	44.5	binary: 50 km; albedo: 0.152	MPC; JPL
2015 VW_{169}	6 November 2015	Maunakea (568)	172	cubewano (hot)?	45.5	0.18	18	37.3	53.7	albedo: 0.079	MPC; JPL
2015 VW_{170}	7 November 2015	Maunakea (568)	87	cubewano (cold)	46.0	0.04	1	44.3	47.8	albedo: 0.152	MPC; JPL
2015 VW_{171}	7 November 2015	Maunakea (568)	75	cubewano (cold)	43.5	0.00	2	43.3	43.7	albedo: 0.152	MPC; JPL
2015 VW_{172}	7 November 2015	Maunakea (568)	82	cubewano (cold)	44.6	0.04	2	42.9	46.3	albedo: 0.152	MPC; JPL
2015 VX_{164}	6 November 2015	Maunakea (568)	43	plutino	39.6	0.34	17	26.3	52.9	albedo: 0.074	MPC; JPL
2015 VX_{165}	6 November 2015	Maunakea (568)	81	nep trj	30.2	0.07	17	28.1	32.4	albedo: 0.058	MPC; JPL
2015 VX_{166}	7 November 2015	Maunakea (568)	78	res · 4:7	43.8	0.12	3	38.4	49.2	albedo: 0.126	MPC; JPL
2015 VX_{167}	6 November 2015	Maunakea (568)	93	other TNO	38.9	0.05	20	37.0	40.8	albedo: 0.13	MPC; JPL
2015 VX_{168}	6 November 2015	Maunakea (568)	82	cubewano (cold)	43.3	0.03	3	42.2	44.5	albedo: 0.152	MPC; JPL
2015 VX_{169}	6 November 2015	Maunakea (568)	94	cubewano (cold)	44.2	0.06	3	41.6	46.7	albedo: 0.152	MPC; JPL
2015 VX_{170}	7 November 2015	Maunakea (568)	65	cubewano (cold)?	47.0	0.07	3	43.6	50.3	albedo: 0.152	MPC; JPL
2015 VX_{171}	7 November 2015	Maunakea (568)	170	cubewano (hot)	45.4	0.10	7	40.8	50.0	albedo: 0.079	MPC; JPL
2015 VX_{172}	7 November 2015	Maunakea (568)	59	cubewano (cold)	43.8	0.03	2	42.3	45.3	albedo: 0.152	MPC; JPL
2015 VX_{184}	7 November 2015	Maunakea (568)	217	SDO	70.0	0.34	34	45.9	94.2	albedo: 0.124	MPC; JPL
2015 VY_{164}	6 November 2015	Maunakea (568)	51	plutino	39.6	0.19	1	32.1	47.1	albedo: 0.074	MPC; JPL
2015 VY_{165}	6 November 2015	Maunakea (568)	108	twotino	48.0	0.30	1	33.4	62.6	albedo: 0.126	MPC; JPL
2015 VY_{166}	7 November 2015	Maunakea (568)	57	res · 4:7	43.9	0.07	1	40.7	47.2	albedo: 0.126	MPC; JPL
2015 VY_{167}	7 November 2015	Maunakea (568)	56	other TNO	39.0	0.01	35	38.6	39.4	albedo: 0.13	MPC; JPL
2015 VY_{168}	6 November 2015	Maunakea (568)	59	cubewano (cold)	43.0	0.03	2	41.9	44.1	albedo: 0.152	MPC; JPL
2015 VY_{169}	6 November 2015	Maunakea (568)	103	cubewano (hot)?	47.1	0.16	11	39.6	54.6	albedo: 0.079	MPC; JPL
2015 VY_{170}	7 November 2015	Maunakea (568)	97	cubewano (cold)	43.4	0.02	2	42.5	44.4	possible binary; albedo: 0.152	MPC; JPL
2015 VY_{171}	7 November 2015	Maunakea (568)	65	cubewano (cold)	43.3	0.03	3	42.3	44.4	albedo: 0.152	MPC; JPL
2015 VY_{172}	7 November 2015	Maunakea (568)	93	cubewano (cold)	45.6	0.05	2	43.6	47.7	albedo: 0.152	MPC; JPL
2015 VY_{184}	7 November 2015	Maunakea (568)	—	—	83.4	0.78	27	18.4	148.4	—	MPC; JPL
2015 VY_{227}	8 November 2015	Subaru Telescope (T09)	171	cubewano (hot)?	47.3	0.11	14	42.1	52.4	albedo: 0.079	MPC; JPL
2015 VZ_{164}	6 November 2015	Maunakea (568)	86	plutino	39.7	0.22	2	30.8	48.6	albedo: 0.074	MPC; JPL
2015 VZ_{165}	6 November 2015	Maunakea (568)	94	twotino	48.0	0.37	4	30.2	65.8	albedo: 0.126	MPC; JPL
2015 VZ_{166}	7 November 2015	Maunakea (568)	49	res · 4:7	44.0	0.07	5	41.0	46.9	albedo: 0.126	MPC; JPL
2015 VZ_{167}	6 November 2015	Maunakea (568)	30	centaur	33.8	0.53	15	16.0	51.6	albedo: 0.058	MPC; JPL
2015 VZ_{168}	6 November 2015	Maunakea (568)	143	cubewano (hot)	44.4	0.15	6	37.9	50.9	albedo: 0.079	MPC; JPL
2015 VZ_{169}	6 November 2015	Maunakea (568)	94	cubewano (cold)	45.5	0.09	2	41.6	49.5	albedo: 0.152	MPC; JPL
2015 VZ_{170}	7 November 2015	Maunakea (568)	75	cubewano (cold)	44.5	0.08	4	40.8	48.2	albedo: 0.152	MPC; JPL
2015 VZ_{171}	7 November 2015	Maunakea (568)	86	cubewano (cold)	44.5	0.08	3	40.8	48.2	albedo: 0.152	MPC; JPL
2015 VZ_{172}	7 November 2015	Maunakea (568)	59	cubewano (cold)	43.3	0.03	2	41.9	44.6	albedo: 0.152	MPC; JPL
2015 XO_{480}	10 December 2015	DECam (W84)	79	other TNO	42.3	0.20	52	34.0	50.6	albedo: 0.13	MPC; JPL
2015 XR_{384}	9 December 2015	Pan-STARRS 1 (F51)	4	damocloid	36.4	0.90	158	3.6	69.3	albedo: 0.048	MPC; JPL

back to top
