= List of unnumbered trans-Neptunian objects: 2017 =

The following is a partial list of unnumbered trans-Neptunian objects for principal designations assigned within 2017. As of November 2026, it contains a total of 270 bodies. For more information see the description on the main page. Also see list for the previous and next year.

== 2017 ==
Designation	First Observed (discovered)		D (km)	Orbital description						Remarks	Refs
Designation	Date	Observer (Site)	D (km)	Class	a (AU)	e	i (°)	q (AU)	Q (AU)	Remarks	Refs
2017 AC_{64}	2 January 2017	COIAS,Subaru Telescope (T09)	55	res · 1:4	76.4	0.47	28	40.6	112.1	albedo: 0.126	MPC; JPL
2017 AD_{62}	2 January 2017	COIAS,Subaru Telescope (T09)	83	cubewano (hot)?	41.8	0.08	24	38.3	45.3	albedo: 0.079	MPC; JPL
2017 BA_{233}	28 January 2017	COIAS,Subaru Telescope (T09)	78	other TNO	46.1	0.21	14	36.5	55.7	albedo: 0.13	MPC; JPL
2017 BA_{237}	30 January 2017	COIAS,Subaru Telescope (T09)	90	cubewano (cold)?	44.6	0.04	4	42.9	46.2	albedo: 0.152	MPC; JPL
2017 BA_{241}	21 January 2017	COIAS,Subaru Telescope (T09)	43	twotino	48.2	0.22	15	37.7	58.7	albedo: 0.126	MPC; JPL
2017 BA_{245}	28 January 2017	COIAS,Subaru Telescope (T09)	95	other TNO	52.5	0.31	12	36.1	68.9	albedo: 0.13	MPC; JPL
2017 BB_{233}	28 January 2017	COIAS,Subaru Telescope (T09)	97	SDO	68.1	0.43	14	39.1	97.1	albedo: 0.124	MPC; JPL
2017 BB_{241}	23 January 2017	COIAS,Subaru Telescope (T09)	63	cubewano (hot)?	43.1	0.03	14	41.9	44.3	albedo: 0.079	MPC; JPL
2017 BB_{245}	28 January 2017	COIAS,Subaru Telescope (T09)	63	SDO	91.9	0.63	19	33.8	150.0	albedo: 0.124	MPC; JPL
2017 BC_{230}	23 January 2017	COIAS,Subaru Telescope (T09)	40	other TNO	41.9	0.23	11	32.4	51.4	albedo: 0.13	MPC; JPL
2017 BC_{232}	23 January 2017	COIAS,Subaru Telescope (T09)	101	cubewano (cold)?	45.3	0.03	2	43.9	46.8	albedo: 0.152	MPC; JPL
2017 BC_{241}	21 January 2017	COIAS,Subaru Telescope (T09)	63	SDO	68.9	0.49	13	35.0	102.8	albedo: 0.124	MPC; JPL
2017 BD_{230}	23 January 2017	COIAS,Subaru Telescope (T09)	81	SDO	53.9	0.37	13	33.9	74.0	albedo: 0.124	MPC; JPL
2017 BD_{232}	23 January 2017	COIAS,Subaru Telescope (T09)	53	cubewano (cold)?	45.1	0.06	2	42.5	47.7	albedo: 0.152	MPC; JPL
2017 BD_{241}	28 January 2017	COIAS,Subaru Telescope (T09)	71	other TNO	45.7	0.16	23	38.6	52.8	albedo: 0.13	MPC; JPL
2017 BE_{226}	21 January 2017	COIAS,Subaru Telescope (T09)	123	cubewano (hot)?	47.7	0.03	14	46.2	49.2	albedo: 0.079	MPC; JPL
2017 BE_{232}	23 January 2017	COIAS,Subaru Telescope (T09)	45	res · 3:5	42.3	0.16	3	35.4	49.3	albedo: 0.126	MPC; JPL
2017 BE_{241}	23 January 2017	COIAS,Subaru Telescope (T09)	48	cubewano (cold)?	47.1	0.09	4	42.6	51.5	albedo: 0.152	MPC; JPL
2017 BF_{226}	23 January 2017	COIAS,Subaru Telescope (T09)	105	plutino	39.5	0.21	8	31.4	47.5	albedo: 0.074	MPC; JPL
2017 BF_{232}	28 January 2017	COIAS,Subaru Telescope (T09)	68	cubewano (cold)?	44.3	0.10	2	39.9	48.6	albedo: 0.152	MPC; JPL
2017 BF_{241}	23 January 2017	COIAS,Subaru Telescope (T09)	41	other TNO	37.8	0.10	31	34.1	41.5	albedo: 0.13	MPC; JPL
2017 BG_{230}	21 January 2017	COIAS,Subaru Telescope (T09)	80	cubewano (hot)?	46.2	0.11	24	41.0	51.4	albedo: 0.079	MPC; JPL
2017 BG_{231}	26 January 2017	COIAS,Subaru Telescope (T09)	88	other TNO	47.0	0.19	30	37.9	56.1	albedo: 0.13	MPC; JPL
2017 BG_{232}	28 January 2017	COIAS,Subaru Telescope (T09)	87	cubewano (hot)?	43.2	0.06	5	40.5	45.9	albedo: 0.079	MPC; JPL
2017 BG_{233}	23 January 2017	COIAS,Subaru Telescope (T09)	57	cubewano (hot)?	41.7	0.10	17	37.6	45.8	albedo: 0.079	MPC; JPL
2017 BG_{237}	21 January 2017	COIAS,Subaru Telescope (T09)	35	SDO	61.1	0.42	12	35.2	86.9	albedo: 0.124	MPC; JPL
2017 BG_{241}	28 January 2017	COIAS,Subaru Telescope (T09)	63	cubewano (cold)?	43.9	0.08	3	40.4	47.3	albedo: 0.152	MPC; JPL
2017 BH_{230}	21 January 2017	COIAS,Subaru Telescope (T09)	109	cubewano (hot)?	47.4	0.09	32	43.3	51.4	albedo: 0.079	MPC; JPL
2017 BH_{231}	21 January 2017	COIAS,Subaru Telescope (T09)	64	cubewano (hot)?	43.9	0.15	10	37.5	50.2	albedo: 0.079	MPC; JPL
2017 BH_{232}	28 January 2017	COIAS,Subaru Telescope (T09)	77	cubewano (cold)?	43.8	0.03	2	42.7	45.0	albedo: 0.152	MPC; JPL
2017 BH_{233}	23 January 2017	COIAS,Subaru Telescope (T09)	67	cubewano (cold)?	44.5	0.06	4	41.8	47.2	albedo: 0.152	MPC; JPL
2017 BH_{237}	21 January 2017	COIAS,Subaru Telescope (T09)	64	SDO	54.7	0.34	10	36.2	73.3	albedo: 0.124	MPC; JPL
2017 BH_{239}	28 January 2017	COIAS,Subaru Telescope (T09)	43	other TNO	33.4	0.10	17	30.0	36.8	albedo: 0.13	MPC; JPL
2017 BH_{241}	23 January 2017	COIAS,Subaru Telescope (T09)	72	cubewano (cold)?	43.8	0.12	2	38.6	49.0	albedo: 0.152	MPC; JPL
2017 BH_{272}	—	—	—	—	43.5	0.02	11	42.6	44.3	—	MPC; JPL
2017 BJ_{230}	23 January 2017	COIAS,Subaru Telescope (T09)	57	other TNO	43.2	0.17	29	35.7	50.7	albedo: 0.13	MPC; JPL
2017 BJ_{231}	21 January 2017	COIAS,Subaru Telescope (T09)	42	twotino	48.0	0.19	9	38.7	57.2	albedo: 0.126	MPC; JPL
2017 BJ_{232}	23 January 2017	COIAS,Subaru Telescope (T09)	43	res · 3:5	42.2	0.21	5	33.6	50.9	albedo: 0.126	MPC; JPL
2017 BJ_{233}	28 January 2017	COIAS,Subaru Telescope (T09)	63	cubewano (hot)?	44.8	0.12	7	39.4	50.3	albedo: 0.079	MPC; JPL
2017 BJ_{239}	23 January 2017	COIAS,Subaru Telescope (T09)	77	cubewano (hot)?	42.0	0.04	22	40.5	43.5	albedo: 0.079	MPC; JPL
2017 BK_{229}	23 January 2017	COIAS,Subaru Telescope (T09)	123	cubewano (hot)?	45.4	0.08	10	41.9	48.8	albedo: 0.079	MPC; JPL
2017 BK_{230}	23 January 2017	COIAS,Subaru Telescope (T09)	44	other TNO	46.3	0.32	13	31.7	60.8	albedo: 0.13	MPC; JPL
2017 BK_{231}	30 January 2017	COIAS,Subaru Telescope (T09)	43	other TNO	47.2	0.21	11	37.2	57.3	albedo: 0.13	MPC; JPL
2017 BK_{232}	23 January 2017	COIAS,Subaru Telescope (T09)	100	cubewano (hot)?	46.7	0.14	18	40.3	53.1	albedo: 0.079	MPC; JPL
2017 BK_{233}	28 January 2017	COIAS,Subaru Telescope (T09)	135	cubewano (hot)?	47.2	0.11	7	41.9	52.6	albedo: 0.079	MPC; JPL
2017 BK_{235}	23 January 2017	COIAS,Subaru Telescope (T09)	115	SDO	65.2	0.43	12	37.0	93.3	albedo: 0.124	MPC; JPL
2017 BK_{239}	30 January 2017	COIAS,Subaru Telescope (T09)	70	cubewano (cold)?	41.0	0.11	4	36.6	45.3	albedo: 0.152	MPC; JPL
2017 BL_{231}	26 January 2017	COIAS,Subaru Telescope (T09)	118	res · 2:7	69.8	0.47	30	37.1	102.4	albedo: 0.126	MPC; JPL
2017 BL_{232}	23 January 2017	COIAS,Subaru Telescope (T09)	207	res · 3:8	58.0	0.38	6	35.8	80.2	albedo: 0.126	MPC; JPL
2017 BL_{233}	28 January 2017	COIAS,Subaru Telescope (T09)	60	cubewano (cold)?	43.6	0.04	3	41.8	45.4	albedo: 0.152	MPC; JPL
2017 BL_{235}	28 January 2017	COIAS,Subaru Telescope (T09)	66	cubewano (cold)?	42.9	0.05	3	40.8	45.0	albedo: 0.152	MPC; JPL
2017 BL_{239}	30 January 2017	COIAS,Subaru Telescope (T09)	110	cubewano (hot)?	39.8	0.11	6	35.6	44.1	albedo: 0.079	MPC; JPL
2017 BM_{231}	21 January 2017	COIAS,Subaru Telescope (T09)	50	res · 3:4	36.6	0.13	15	31.8	41.3	albedo: 0.126	MPC; JPL
2017 BM_{233}	23 January 2017	COIAS,Subaru Telescope (T09)	58	cubewano (cold)?	42.9	0.03	3	41.7	44.0	albedo: 0.152	MPC; JPL
2017 BM_{235}	28 January 2017	COIAS,Subaru Telescope (T09)	52	cubewano (cold)?	45.2	0.09	4	41.2	49.3	albedo: 0.152	MPC; JPL
2017 BM_{239}	30 January 2017	COIAS,Subaru Telescope (T09)	91	cubewano (hot)?	41.0	0.11	6	36.7	45.3	albedo: 0.079	MPC; JPL
2017 BN_{233}	28 January 2017	COIAS,Subaru Telescope (T09)	123	other TNO	47.2	0.21	12	37.2	57.2	albedo: 0.13	MPC; JPL
2017 BN_{235}	28 January 2017	COIAS,Subaru Telescope (T09)	57	cubewano (cold)?	44.5	0.05	3	42.3	46.7	albedo: 0.152	MPC; JPL
2017 BN_{239}	28 January 2017	COIAS,Subaru Telescope (T09)	123	cubewano (hot)?	46.5	0.04	24	44.7	48.3	albedo: 0.079	MPC; JPL
2017 BO_{231}	21 January 2017	COIAS,Subaru Telescope (T09)	38	res · 4:7	43.9	0.22	9	34.5	53.4	albedo: 0.126	MPC; JPL
2017 BO_{236}	23 January 2017	COIAS,Subaru Telescope (T09)	68	cubewano (hot)?	41.4	0.08	30	38.2	44.6	albedo: 0.079	MPC; JPL
2017 BO_{237}	26 January 2017	COIAS,Subaru Telescope (T09)	109	centaur	71.2	0.67	14	23.4	119.1	albedo: 0.058	MPC; JPL
2017 BO_{239}	28 January 2017	COIAS,Subaru Telescope (T09)	169	cubewano (hot)?	42.8	0.12	15	37.8	47.8	albedo: 0.079	MPC; JPL
2017 BP_{236}	26 January 2017	COIAS,Subaru Telescope (T09)	74	other TNO	35.4	0.05	18	33.5	37.3	albedo: 0.13	MPC; JPL
2017 BP_{237}	21 January 2017	COIAS,Subaru Telescope (T09)	59	other TNO	46.7	0.19	11	37.9	55.5	albedo: 0.13	MPC; JPL
2017 BP_{239}	23 January 2017	COIAS,Subaru Telescope (T09)	100	other TNO	39.1	0.11	5	35.0	43.2	albedo: 0.13	MPC; JPL
2017 BP_{272}	—	—	—	—	59.3	0.45	8	32.3	86.2	—	MPC; JPL
2017 BQ_{236}	21 January 2017	COIAS,Subaru Telescope (T09)	93	cubewano (hot)?	44.2	0.20	21	35.2	53.1	albedo: 0.079	MPC; JPL
2017 BQ_{237}	21 January 2017	COIAS,Subaru Telescope (T09)	81	other TNO	40.3	0.06	18	38.1	42.6	albedo: 0.13	MPC; JPL
2017 BQ_{239}	30 January 2017	COIAS,Subaru Telescope (T09)	206	cubewano (hot)?	44.5	0.11	7	39.8	49.2	albedo: 0.079	MPC; JPL
2017 BQ_{263}	21 January 2017	COIAS,Subaru Telescope (T09)	52	cubewano (hot)?	40.4	0.04	28	38.6	42.2	albedo: 0.079	MPC; JPL
2017 BR_{236}	28 January 2017	COIAS,Subaru Telescope (T09)	126	cubewano (hot)?	41.7	0.05	15	39.7	43.7	albedo: 0.079	MPC; JPL
2017 BR_{237}	21 January 2017	COIAS,Subaru Telescope (T09)	52	other TNO	43.0	0.16	15	36.2	49.8	albedo: 0.13	MPC; JPL
2017 BS_{236}	23 January 2017	COIAS,Subaru Telescope (T09)	103	other TNO	44.3	0.18	24	36.5	52.0	albedo: 0.13	MPC; JPL
2017 BS_{237}	23 January 2017	COIAS,Subaru Telescope (T09)	81	SDO	75.5	0.54	20	35.1	115.9	albedo: 0.124	MPC; JPL
2017 BS_{244}	28 January 2017	COIAS,Subaru Telescope (T09)	81	cubewano (cold)?	43.9	0.06	4	41.4	46.4	albedo: 0.152	MPC; JPL
2017 BS_{254}	21 January 2017	COIAS,Subaru Telescope (T09)	71	cubewano (hot)?	44.7	0.12	12	39.3	50.1	albedo: 0.079	MPC; JPL
2017 BU_{236}	30 January 2017	COIAS,Subaru Telescope (T09)	66	other TNO	48.0	0.15	19	40.9	55.2	albedo: 0.13	MPC; JPL
2017 BU_{263}	23 January 2017	COIAS,Subaru Telescope (T09)	68	cubewano (hot)?	43.4	0.10	13	39.0	47.9	albedo: 0.079	MPC; JPL
2017 BV_{236}	28 January 2017	COIAS,Subaru Telescope (T09)	78	cubewano (hot)?	46.6	0.18	7	38.0	55.1	albedo: 0.079	MPC; JPL
2017 BW_{236}	28 January 2017	COIAS,Subaru Telescope (T09)	55	cubewano (cold)?	43.9	0.06	2	41.4	46.4	albedo: 0.152	MPC; JPL
2017 BW_{263}	23 January 2017	COIAS,Subaru Telescope (T09)	60	cubewano (hot)?	46.7	0.12	15	41.2	52.1	albedo: 0.079	MPC; JPL
2017 BX_{236}	28 January 2017	COIAS,Subaru Telescope (T09)	46	cubewano (cold)?	46.0	0.08	3	42.3	49.7	albedo: 0.152	MPC; JPL
2017 BY_{236}	30 January 2017	COIAS,Subaru Telescope (T09)	73	cubewano (cold)?	46.8	0.09	5	42.4	51.2	albedo: 0.152	MPC; JPL
2017 BY_{244}	23 January 2017	COIAS,Subaru Telescope (T09)	48	cubewano (cold)?	43.0	0.06	2	40.3	45.8	albedo: 0.152	MPC; JPL
2017 BZ_{232}	28 January 2017	COIAS,Subaru Telescope (T09)	74	SDO	68.1	0.43	46	38.8	97.5	albedo: 0.124	MPC; JPL
2017 BZ_{236}	28 January 2017	COIAS,Subaru Telescope (T09)	52	SDO	111.9	0.73	19	30.1	193.7	albedo: 0.124	MPC; JPL
2017 BZ_{244}	21 January 2017	COIAS,Subaru Telescope (T09)	100	cubewano (hot)?	43.2	0.13	15	37.8	48.6	albedo: 0.079	MPC; JPL
2017 CA_{58}	1 February 2017	COIAS,Subaru Telescope (T09)	115	other TNO	47.2	0.10	29	42.3	52.0	albedo: 0.13	MPC; JPL
2017 CB_{56}	2 February 2017	COIAS,Subaru Telescope (T09)	73	SDO	76.7	0.50	33	38.6	114.8	albedo: 0.124	MPC; JPL
2017 CC_{56}	2 February 2017	COIAS,Subaru Telescope (T09)	58	twotino	47.8	0.31	16	33.1	62.5	albedo: 0.126	MPC; JPL
2017 CD_{56}	1 February 2017	COIAS,Subaru Telescope (T09)	106	plutino	39.6	0.07	14	36.9	42.3	albedo: 0.074	MPC; JPL
2017 CD_{60}	2 February 2017	COIAS,Subaru Telescope (T09)	100	cubewano (hot)?	42.1	0.04	13	40.5	43.6	albedo: 0.079	MPC; JPL
2017 CE_{56}	2 February 2017	COIAS,Subaru Telescope (T09)	77	cubewano (cold)?	46.3	0.07	5	43.3	49.4	albedo: 0.152	MPC; JPL
2017 CE_{60}	1 February 2017	COIAS,Subaru Telescope (T09)	111	centaur	42.6	0.50	25	21.2	64.0	albedo: 0.058	MPC; JPL
2017 CF_{56}	2 February 2017	COIAS,Subaru Telescope (T09)	39	centaur	55.0	0.60	15	22.3	87.7	albedo: 0.058	MPC; JPL
2017 CF_{60}	1 February 2017	COIAS,Subaru Telescope (T09)	180	cubewano (hot)?	44.2	0.10	13	39.9	48.5	albedo: 0.079	MPC; JPL
2017 CG_{56}	2 February 2017	COIAS,Subaru Telescope (T09)	26	centaur	47.4	0.60	16	19.1	75.7	albedo: 0.058	MPC; JPL
2017 CH_{55}	2 February 2017	COIAS,Subaru Telescope (T09)	83	res · 4:7	43.9	0.20	12	35.1	52.6	albedo: 0.126	MPC; JPL
2017 CH_{56}	1 February 2017	COIAS,Subaru Telescope (T09)	100	plutino	39.6	0.14	16	34.1	45.2	albedo: 0.074	MPC; JPL
2017 CJ_{55}	2 February 2017	COIAS,Subaru Telescope (T09)	51	cubewano (cold)?	44.1	0.06	3	41.6	46.6	albedo: 0.152	MPC; JPL
2017 CJ_{56}	2 February 2017	COIAS,Subaru Telescope (T09)	73	cubewano (hot)?	47.6	0.10	23	42.8	52.4	albedo: 0.079	MPC; JPL
2017 CJ_{69}	—	—	—	—	67.8	0.49	28	34.3	101.2	—	MPC; JPL
2017 CL_{54}	2 February 2017	COIAS,Subaru Telescope (T09)	109	SDO	217.8	0.84	15	36.0	399.6	albedo: 0.124	MPC; JPL
2017 CN_{54}	2 February 2017	COIAS,Subaru Telescope (T09)	81	cubewano (hot)?	48.3	0.14	14	41.4	55.2	albedo: 0.079	MPC; JPL
2017 CO_{54}	2 February 2017	COIAS,Subaru Telescope (T09)	67	res · 4:7	43.9	0.11	13	38.9	48.8	albedo: 0.126	MPC; JPL
2017 CT_{58}	2 February 2017	COIAS,Subaru Telescope (T09)	75	SDO	91.9	0.52	12	43.9	139.8	albedo: 0.124	MPC; JPL
2017 CV_{56}	1 February 2017	COIAS,Subaru Telescope (T09)	123	cubewano (hot)?	43.7	0.09	18	39.8	47.6	albedo: 0.079	MPC; JPL
2017 CW_{32}	2 February 2017	University of Arizona Mt. Lemmon Survey (G96)	5	damocloid	168.9	0.98	153	3.0	334.8	albedo: 0.048	MPC; JPL
2017 CW_{57}	2 February 2017	COIAS,Subaru Telescope (T09)	61	cubewano (cold)?	44.7	0.10	4	40.1	49.4	albedo: 0.152	MPC; JPL
2017 CZ_{57}	1 February 2017	COIAS,Subaru Telescope (T09)	56	other TNO	34.0	0.10	25	30.7	37.3	albedo: 0.13	MPC; JPL
2017 DA_{160}	21 February 2017	COIAS,Subaru Telescope (T09)	60	cubewano (cold)?	43.0	0.04	5	41.4	44.7	albedo: 0.152	MPC; JPL
2017 DA_{165}	23 February 2017	COIAS,Subaru Telescope (T09)	101	cubewano (cold)?	44.0	0.04	5	42.5	45.6	albedo: 0.152	MPC; JPL
2017 DB_{165}	23 February 2017	COIAS,Subaru Telescope (T09)	88	cubewano (cold)?	44.2	0.09	5	40.3	48.1	albedo: 0.152	MPC; JPL
2017 DB_{170}	23 February 2017	COIAS,Subaru Telescope (T09)	60	cubewano (cold)?	46.3	0.14	4	40.0	52.6	albedo: 0.152	MPC; JPL
2017 DC_{165}	21 February 2017	COIAS,Subaru Telescope (T09)	91	cubewano (cold)?	45.5	0.09	4	41.4	49.5	albedo: 0.152	MPC; JPL
2017 DC_{170}	23 February 2017	COIAS,Subaru Telescope (T09)	81	cubewano (cold)?	45.1	0.08	3	41.3	48.8	albedo: 0.152	MPC; JPL
2017 DD_{162}	23 February 2017	COIAS,Subaru Telescope (T09)	88	cubewano (cold)?	43.2	0.02	4	42.3	44.0	albedo: 0.152	MPC; JPL
2017 DD_{165}	21 February 2017	COIAS,Subaru Telescope (T09)	79	res · 3:4	36.4	0.04	7	34.8	37.9	albedo: 0.126	MPC; JPL
2017 DD_{170}	21 February 2017	COIAS,Subaru Telescope (T09)	93	other TNO	38.2	0.04	27	36.9	39.6	albedo: 0.13	MPC; JPL
2017 DE_{157}	21 February 2017	COIAS,Subaru Telescope (T09)	93	SDO	81.5	0.60	18	33.0	130.0	albedo: 0.124	MPC; JPL
2017 DE_{165}	23 February 2017	COIAS,Subaru Telescope (T09)	55	other TNO	39.1	0.09	5	35.7	42.5	albedo: 0.13	MPC; JPL
2017 DE_{168}	21 February 2017	COIAS,Subaru Telescope (T09)	127	SDO	93.4	0.60	28	37.6	149.2	albedo: 0.124	MPC; JPL
2017 DE_{170}	23 February 2017	COIAS,Subaru Telescope (T09)	82	SDO	85.5	0.55	14	38.3	132.7	albedo: 0.124	MPC; JPL
2017 DF_{156}	21 February 2017	COIAS,Subaru Telescope (T09)	56	twotino	48.2	0.26	10	35.6	60.7	albedo: 0.126	MPC; JPL
2017 DF_{165}	21 February 2017	COIAS,Subaru Telescope (T09)	57	cubewano (cold)?	42.8	0.06	4	40.1	45.6	albedo: 0.152	MPC; JPL
2017 DF_{168}	21 February 2017	COIAS,Subaru Telescope (T09)	53	SDO	56.4	0.28	5	40.7	72.1	albedo: 0.124	MPC; JPL
2017 DF_{170}	21 February 2017	COIAS,Subaru Telescope (T09)	36	res · 4:7	43.8	0.22	12	34.2	53.4	albedo: 0.126	MPC; JPL
2017 DG_{165}	21 February 2017	COIAS,Subaru Telescope (T09)	107	cubewano (cold)?	43.3	0.01	4	43.0	43.5	albedo: 0.152	MPC; JPL
2017 DG_{170}	21 February 2017	COIAS,Subaru Telescope (T09)	42	cubewano (cold)?	43.3	0.05	4	41.1	45.4	albedo: 0.152	MPC; JPL
2017 DH_{160}	21 February 2017	COIAS,Subaru Telescope (T09)	66	res · 3:4	36.5	0.08	6	33.8	39.2	albedo: 0.126	MPC; JPL
2017 DH_{163}	21 February 2017	COIAS,Subaru Telescope (T09)	47	other TNO	44.5	0.17	23	37.2	51.8	albedo: 0.13	MPC; JPL
2017 DH_{170}	21 February 2017	COIAS,Subaru Telescope (T09)	75	cubewano (hot)?	44.9	0.12	5	39.5	50.4	albedo: 0.079	MPC; JPL
2017 DH_{171}	23 February 2017	COIAS,Subaru Telescope (T09)	177	cubewano (hot)?	45.6	0.11	7	40.5	50.7	albedo: 0.079	MPC; JPL
2017 DJ_{160}	21 February 2017	COIAS,Subaru Telescope (T09)	88	cubewano (hot)?	47.4	0.19	13	38.2	56.5	albedo: 0.079	MPC; JPL
2017 DJ_{163}	23 February 2017	COIAS,Subaru Telescope (T09)	82	cubewano (cold)?	44.8	0.10	3	40.3	49.3	albedo: 0.152	MPC; JPL
2017 DJ_{170}	21 February 2017	COIAS,Subaru Telescope (T09)	128	cubewano (hot)?	43.8	0.07	6	40.6	46.9	albedo: 0.079	MPC; JPL
2017 DJ_{171}	23 February 2017	COIAS,Subaru Telescope (T09)	102	cubewano (hot)?	43.2	0.13	13	37.6	48.8	albedo: 0.079	MPC; JPL
2017 DK_{160}	21 February 2017	COIAS,Subaru Telescope (T09)	93	SDO	56.4	0.37	17	35.6	77.1	albedo: 0.124	MPC; JPL
2017 DK_{163}	23 February 2017	COIAS,Subaru Telescope (T09)	94	SDO	69.1	0.47	12	36.6	101.7	albedo: 0.124	MPC; JPL
2017 DK_{170}	23 February 2017	COIAS,Subaru Telescope (T09)	45	cubewano (cold)?	43.9	0.08	3	40.5	47.4	albedo: 0.152	MPC; JPL
2017 DK_{171}	23 February 2017	COIAS,Subaru Telescope (T09)	93	cubewano (cold)?	43.3	0.01	4	42.7	43.8	albedo: 0.152	MPC; JPL
2017 DL_{160}	21 February 2017	COIAS,Subaru Telescope (T09)	75	cubewano (hot)?	43.4	0.08	6	40.0	46.8	albedo: 0.079	MPC; JPL
2017 DL_{170}	21 February 2017	COIAS,Subaru Telescope (T09)	126	plutino	39.3	0.24	8	29.8	48.8	albedo: 0.074	MPC; JPL
2017 DL_{171}	21 February 2017	COIAS,Subaru Telescope (T09)	118	plutino	39.2	0.27	5	28.7	49.8	albedo: 0.074	MPC; JPL
2017 DM_{121}	24 February 2017	Maunakea (568)	167	cubewano (hot)	44.7	0.07	10	41.4	47.9	albedo: 0.079	MPC; JPL
2017 DM_{160}	21 February 2017	COIAS,Subaru Telescope (T09)	111	cubewano (hot)?	43.9	0.03	6	42.8	45.0	albedo: 0.079	MPC; JPL
2017 DM_{162}	23 February 2017	COIAS,Subaru Telescope (T09)	73	cubewano (hot)?	44.4	0.12	9	39.2	49.7	albedo: 0.079	MPC; JPL
2017 DM_{170}	21 February 2017	COIAS,Subaru Telescope (T09)	55	cubewano (cold)?	43.8	0.05	4	41.7	45.9	albedo: 0.152	MPC; JPL
2017 DM_{171}	21 February 2017	COIAS,Subaru Telescope (T09)	115	cubewano (cold)?	43.2	0.01	5	42.7	43.8	albedo: 0.152	MPC; JPL
2017 DN_{121}	24 February 2017	Maunakea (568)	127	twotino	48.1	0.23	15	36.9	59.3	albedo: 0.126	MPC; JPL
2017 DN_{160}	21 February 2017	COIAS,Subaru Telescope (T09)	175	cubewano (hot)?	44.7	0.07	5	41.7	47.8	albedo: 0.079	MPC; JPL
2017 DN_{162}	23 February 2017	COIAS,Subaru Telescope (T09)	86	cubewano (cold)?	47.1	0.08	5	43.6	50.7	albedo: 0.152	MPC; JPL
2017 DN_{164}	23 February 2017	COIAS,Subaru Telescope (T09)	45	other TNO	37.9	0.06	21	35.7	40.0	albedo: 0.13	MPC; JPL
2017 DN_{166}	23 February 2017	COIAS,Subaru Telescope (T09)	115	cubewano (cold)?	42.2	0.10	4	37.8	46.6	albedo: 0.152	MPC; JPL
2017 DN_{170}	21 February 2017	COIAS,Subaru Telescope (T09)	233	res · 2:5	55.3	0.44	5	31.1	79.6	albedo: 0.126	MPC; JPL
2017 DN_{171}	21 February 2017	COIAS,Subaru Telescope (T09)	134	cubewano (hot)?	42.6	0.10	20	38.4	46.7	albedo: 0.079	MPC; JPL
2017 DO_{121}	24 February 2017	Maunakea (568)	167	centaur	182.2	0.85	16	26.9	337.5	albedo: 0.058	MPC; JPL
2017 DO_{162}	23 February 2017	COIAS,Subaru Telescope (T09)	91	cubewano (hot)?	44.0	0.10	5	39.6	48.4	albedo: 0.079	MPC; JPL
2017 DO_{164}	23 February 2017	COIAS,Subaru Telescope (T09)	96	other TNO	41.8	0.15	30	35.4	48.2	albedo: 0.13	MPC; JPL
2017 DO_{166}	23 February 2017	COIAS,Subaru Telescope (T09)	134	cubewano (hot)?	40.3	0.16	10	33.8	46.8	albedo: 0.079	MPC; JPL
2017 DO_{171}	21 February 2017	COIAS,Subaru Telescope (T09)	82	SDO	120.4	0.65	38	42.2	198.5	albedo: 0.124	MPC; JPL
2017 DO_{177}	21 February 2017	COIAS,Subaru Telescope (T09)	45	res · 3:4	36.7	0.13	15	31.9	41.4	albedo: 0.126	MPC; JPL
2017 DP_{121}	24 February 2017	Maunakea (568)	131	SDO	62.6	0.47	14	33.3	92.0	albedo: 0.124	MPC; JPL
2017 DP_{164}	21 February 2017	COIAS,Subaru Telescope (T09)	138	cubewano (hot)?	44.4	0.08	11	40.7	48.1	albedo: 0.079	MPC; JPL
2017 DP_{166}	23 February 2017	COIAS,Subaru Telescope (T09)	74	other TNO	37.5	0.10	6	33.8	41.2	albedo: 0.13	MPC; JPL
2017 DP_{171}	23 February 2017	COIAS,Subaru Telescope (T09)	88	cubewano (hot)?	45.1	0.01	6	44.6	45.5	albedo: 0.079	MPC; JPL
2017 DQ_{164}	23 February 2017	COIAS,Subaru Telescope (T09)	92	res · 4:7	43.7	0.08	2	40.1	47.3	albedo: 0.126	MPC; JPL
2017 DQ_{166}	23 February 2017	COIAS,Subaru Telescope (T09)	130	cubewano (hot)?	42.7	0.11	11	38.2	47.2	albedo: 0.079	MPC; JPL
2017 DQ_{171}	23 February 2017	COIAS,Subaru Telescope (T09)	56	cubewano (hot)?	45.7	0.17	8	37.8	53.5	albedo: 0.079	MPC; JPL
2017 DQ_{187}	—	—	—	—	39.4	0.18	7	32.2	46.7	—	MPC; JPL
2017 DR_{164}	23 February 2017	COIAS,Subaru Telescope (T09)	78	cubewano (cold)?	44.1	0.07	4	40.9	47.3	albedo: 0.152	MPC; JPL
2017 DR_{166}	23 February 2017	COIAS,Subaru Telescope (T09)	109	SDO	57.6	0.47	4	30.6	84.6	albedo: 0.124	MPC; JPL
2017 DS_{164}	23 February 2017	COIAS,Subaru Telescope (T09)	128	cubewano (hot)?	46.1	0.15	19	39.3	52.9	albedo: 0.079	MPC; JPL
2017 DS_{165}	21 February 2017	COIAS,Subaru Telescope (T09)	47	other TNO	41.0	0.06	14	38.5	43.5	albedo: 0.13	MPC; JPL
2017 DT_{164}	23 February 2017	COIAS,Subaru Telescope (T09)	77	cubewano (cold)?	44.2	0.05	4	42.1	46.3	albedo: 0.152	MPC; JPL
2017 DT_{187}	—	—	—	—	39.2	0.11	3.9	35.1	43.4	—	MPC; JPL
2017 DU_{159}	23 February 2017	COIAS,Subaru Telescope (T09)	65	cubewano (hot)?	44.3	0.11	9	39.3	49.2	albedo: 0.079	MPC; JPL
2017 DU_{164}	23 February 2017	COIAS,Subaru Telescope (T09)	117	cubewano (cold)?	42.9	0.03	4	41.8	44.0	albedo: 0.152	MPC; JPL
2017 DU_{165}	21 February 2017	COIAS,Subaru Telescope (T09)	120	centaur	54.5	0.52	5	26.2	82.8	albedo: 0.058	MPC; JPL
2017 DV_{159}	23 February 2017	COIAS,Subaru Telescope (T09)	133	other TNO	50.4	0.31	34	34.8	66.0	albedo: 0.13	MPC; JPL
2017 DV_{165}	21 February 2017	COIAS,Subaru Telescope (T09)	91	cubewano (hot)?	42.6	0.03	5	41.1	44.0	albedo: 0.079	MPC; JPL
2017 DV_{177}	25 February 2017	COIAS,Subaru Telescope (T09)	44	SDO	174.4	0.81	24	32.6	316.1	albedo: 0.124	MPC; JPL
2017 DW_{165}	23 February 2017	COIAS,Subaru Telescope (T09)	75	cubewano (hot)?	45.5	0.19	10	36.9	54.1	albedo: 0.079	MPC; JPL
2017 DX_{165}	23 February 2017	COIAS,Subaru Telescope (T09)	64	cubewano (cold)?	44.6	0.12	3	39.5	49.7	albedo: 0.152	MPC; JPL
2017 DY_{166}	23 February 2017	COIAS,Subaru Telescope (T09)	117	SDO	62.0	0.42	18	35.7	88.3	albedo: 0.124	MPC; JPL
2017 DZ_{159}	21 February 2017	COIAS,Subaru Telescope (T09)	91	other TNO	53.0	0.26	28	39.2	66.8	albedo: 0.13	MPC; JPL
2017 DZ_{164}	23 February 2017	COIAS,Subaru Telescope (T09)	112	cubewano (cold)?	46.4	0.14	5	39.8	53.0	albedo: 0.152	MPC; JPL
2017 EA_{58}	6 March 2017	COIAS,Subaru Telescope (T09)	100	cubewano (hot)?	43.5	0.13	11	38.0	49.0	albedo: 0.079	MPC; JPL
2017 ED_{52}	6 March 2017	COIAS,Subaru Telescope (T09)	99	SDO	116.4	0.67	23	38.8	194.0	albedo: 0.124	MPC; JPL
2017 ED_{58}	6 March 2017	COIAS,Subaru Telescope (T09)	61	cubewano (hot)?	42.4	0.13	19	37.1	47.7	albedo: 0.079	MPC; JPL
2017 EE_{52}	6 March 2017	COIAS,Subaru Telescope (T09)	110	cubewano (hot)?	46.0	0.11	6	41.0	51.0	albedo: 0.079	MPC; JPL
2017 EF_{53}	6 March 2017	COIAS,Subaru Telescope (T09)	121	SDO	80.7	0.54	31	37.0	124.4	albedo: 0.124	MPC; JPL
2017 EG_{53}	4 March 2017	COIAS,Subaru Telescope (T09)	182	other TNO	43.8	0.15	17	37.1	50.5	albedo: 0.13	MPC; JPL
2017 EH_{56}	6 March 2017	COIAS,Subaru Telescope (T09)	79	cubewano (hot)?	43.8	0.08	5	40.2	47.5	albedo: 0.079	MPC; JPL
2017 EJ_{52}	6 March 2017	COIAS,Subaru Telescope (T09)	83	other TNO	50.4	0.20	53	40.3	60.5	albedo: 0.13	MPC; JPL
2017 EJ_{53}	6 March 2017	COIAS,Subaru Telescope (T09)	72	res · 5:8	41.2	0.08	12	37.8	44.7	albedo: 0.126	MPC; JPL
2017 EM_{4}	8 March 2017	Mt. Lemmon Survey (G96)	4	damocloid	32.9	0.92	84	2.6	63.1	albedo: 0.048	MPC; JPL
2017 EN_{51}	6 March 2017	COIAS,Subaru Telescope (T09)	37	other TNO	45.9	0.18	18	37.8	54.1	albedo: 0.13	MPC; JPL
2017 EN_{52}	6 March 2017	COIAS,Subaru Telescope (T09)	168	plutino	39.2	0.28	17	28.2	50.1	albedo: 0.074	MPC; JPL
2017 EN_{53}	4 March 2017	COIAS,Subaru Telescope (T09)	49	centaur	38.9	0.33	8	26.2	51.6	albedo: 0.058	MPC; JPL
2017 EO_{50}	4 March 2017	COIAS,Subaru Telescope (T09)	169	cubewano (hot)?	43.5	0.07	11	40.5	46.4	albedo: 0.079	MPC; JPL
2017 EO_{53}	6 March 2017	COIAS,Subaru Telescope (T09)	59	cubewano (hot)?	47.2	0.24	25	36.1	58.3	albedo: 0.079	MPC; JPL
2017 EO_{64}	—	—	—	—	41.0	0.06	17	38.4	43.7	—	MPC; JPL
2017 EP_{53}	4 March 2017	COIAS,Subaru Telescope (T09)	56	other TNO	48.2	0.27	26	35.1	61.3	albedo: 0.13	MPC; JPL
2017 ES_{51}	4 March 2017	COIAS,Subaru Telescope (T09)	56	res · 3:11	72.2	0.60	14	29.0	115.3	albedo: 0.126	MPC; JPL
2017 EU_{57}	6 March 2017	COIAS,Subaru Telescope (T09)	60	res · 2:5	55.7	0.35	14	36.0	75.4	albedo: 0.126	MPC; JPL
2017 EV_{51}	6 March 2017	COIAS,Subaru Telescope (T09)	80	other TNO	44.6	0.18	21	36.5	52.8	albedo: 0.13	MPC; JPL
2017 EW_{51}	4 March 2017	COIAS,Subaru Telescope (T09)	72	other TNO	40.8	0.07	15	37.8	43.8	albedo: 0.13	MPC; JPL
2017 EY_{49}	6 March 2017	COIAS,Subaru Telescope (T09)	71	res · 4:7	43.8	0.22	11	34.2	53.4	albedo: 0.126	MPC; JPL
2017 EY_{59}	4 March 2017	COIAS,Subaru Telescope (T09)	83	centaur	60.4	0.50	10	30.4	90.4	albedo: 0.058	MPC; JPL
2017 EZ_{60}	6 March 2017	COIAS,Subaru Telescope (T09)	87	other TNO	38.2	0.04	21	36.6	39.9	albedo: 0.13	MPC; JPL
2017 FC_{261}	—	—	—	—	66.5	0.48	33	34.7	98.4	—	MPC; JPL
2017 FD_{163}	25 March 2017	Cerro Tololo Observatory, La Serena (807)	157	SDO	47.6	0.37	13	30.1	65.2	albedo: 0.124	MPC; JPL
2017 FE_{159}	23 March 2017	S. S. Sheppard (807)	191	cubewano (cold)?	45.3	0.06	2	42.6	48.0	albedo: 0.152	MPC; JPL
2017 FE_{173}	23 March 2017	Cerro Tololo Observatory, La Serena (807)	145	SDO	105.3	0.60	31	41.9	168.7	albedo: 0.124	MPC; JPL
2017 FF_{226}	22 March 2017	COIAS,Subaru Telescope (T09)	176	SDO	62.4	0.37	16	39.5	85.3	albedo: 0.124	MPC; JPL
2017 FG_{226}	22 March 2017	COIAS,Subaru Telescope (T09)	107	cubewano (hot)?	46.2	0.19	11	37.5	54.9	albedo: 0.079	MPC; JPL
2017 FH_{252}	22 March 2017	COIAS,Subaru Telescope (T09)	76	twotino	48.0	0.24	11	36.6	59.3	albedo: 0.126	MPC; JPL
2017 FO_{161}	23 March 2017	Cerro Tololo Observatory, La Serena (807)	509	SDO	59.8	0.42	54	34.5	85.2	albedo: 0.124	MPC; JPL
2017 FP_{161}	23 March 2017	Cerro Tololo Observatory, La Serena (807)	143	twotino	47.8	0.16	15	40.0	55.5	albedo: 0.126	MPC; JPL
2017 FP_{237}	25 March 2017	COIAS,Subaru Telescope (T09)	71	cubewano (hot)?	44.6	0.07	27	41.4	47.7	albedo: 0.079	MPC; JPL
2017 FQ_{161}	26 March 2017	Cerro Tololo Observatory, La Serena (807)	217	twotino	47.7	0.27	8	34.9	60.5	albedo: 0.126	MPC; JPL
2017 FS_{247}	22 March 2017	COIAS,Subaru Telescope (T09)	38	other TNO	51.4	0.35	23	33.3	69.5	albedo: 0.13	MPC; JPL
2017 FT_{232}	22 March 2017	COIAS,Subaru Telescope (T09)	74	other TNO	45.6	0.17	14	37.9	53.3	albedo: 0.13	MPC; JPL
2017 FU_{231}	22 March 2017	COIAS,Subaru Telescope (T09)	85	cubewano (hot)?	44.6	0.04	27	42.7	46.5	albedo: 0.079	MPC; JPL
2017 FV_{241}	25 March 2017	COIAS,Subaru Telescope (T09)	55	twotino	47.8	0.34	9	31.4	64.2	albedo: 0.126	MPC; JPL
2017 FW_{241}	25 March 2017	COIAS,Subaru Telescope (T09)	57	res · 3:4	36.5	0.08	12	33.8	39.2	albedo: 0.126	MPC; JPL
2017 FW_{261}	—	—	—	—	47.9	0.14	1	41.1	54.7	—	MPC; JPL
2017 FX_{234}	25 March 2017	COIAS,Subaru Telescope (T09)	130	other TNO	46.6	0.21	21	37.0	56.1	albedo: 0.13	MPC; JPL
2017 GD_{8}	1 April 2017	Pan-STARRS 1 (F51)	1.9	damocloid	42.4	0.95	75	2.3	82.5	albedo: 0.048	MPC; JPL
2017 GU_{36}	2 April 2017	COIAS,Subaru Telescope (T09)	70	cubewano (hot)?	44.1	0.08	6	40.7	47.6	albedo: 0.079	MPC; JPL
2017 HQ_{108}	26 April 2017	COIAS,Subaru Telescope (T09)	81	SDO	74.1	0.57	10	31.6	116.6	albedo: 0.124	MPC; JPL
2017 HV_{109}	26 April 2017	COIAS,Subaru Telescope (T09)	117	cubewano (hot)?	45.3	0.13	11	39.4	51.2	albedo: 0.079	MPC; JPL
2017 JB_{6}	4 May 2017	Pan-STARRS 1 (F51)	6	damocloid	32.7	0.88	161	3.8	61.6	albedo: 0.048	MPC; JPL
2017 MB_{7}	22 June 2017	Pan-STARRS 1 (F51)	9	damocloid	1729.7	1.00	56	4.4	3455.1	albedo: 0.048	MPC; JPL
2017 MP_{42}	24 June 2017	COIAS,Subaru Telescope (T09)	147	other TNO	39.5	0.18	16	32.3	46.8	albedo: 0.13	MPC; JPL
2017 MZ_{4}	24 June 2017	Pan-STARRS 1 (F51)	13	damocloid	66.6	0.95	66	3.2	130.1	albedo: 0.048	MPC; JPL
2017 OF201	23 July 2017	DECam (W84)	757	EDDO	825.0	0.95	16	45.1	1604.9	albedo: 0.124	MPC; JPL
2017 OG_{69}	26 July 2017	Maunakea (568)	304	cubewano (hot)?	40.3	0.08	25	37.3	43.3	albedo: 0.079	MPC; JPL
2017 OH_{204}	—	—	—	—	38.0	0.06	23	35.9	40.1	—	MPC; JPL
2017 OK_{69}	26 July 2017	Maunakea (568)	249	SDO	50.1	0.29	24	35.8	64.3	albedo: 0.124	MPC; JPL
2017 OQ_{146}	23 July 2017	Maunakea (568)	56	cubewano (cold)?	43.7	0.10	3	39.2	48.2	albedo: 0.152	MPC; JPL
2017 OR_{146}	23 July 2017	Maunakea (568)	60	other TNO	34.8	0.10	39	31.2	38.4	albedo: 0.13	MPC; JPL
2017 OW_{166}	20 July 2017	New Horizons KBO Search (266)	99	plutino	39.3	0.26	2	29.1	49.5	albedo: 0.074	MPC; JPL
2017 OX_{166}	20 July 2017	New Horizons KBO Search (266)	29	cubewano (cold)	44.0	0.07	2	40.8	47.1	albedo: 0.152	MPC; JPL
2017 OX_{68}	26 July 2017	Pan-STARRS 1 (F51)	1.7	damocloid	58.5	0.97	95	1.7	115.3	albedo: 0.048	MPC; JPL
2017 OY_{166}	20 July 2017	New Horizons KBO Search (266)	66	cubewano (cold)?	44.3	0.08	2	40.7	47.9	albedo: 0.152	MPC; JPL
2017 QB_{220}	18 August 2017	COIAS,Subaru Telescope (T09)	89	other TNO	40.5	0.10	18	36.3	44.7	albedo: 0.13	MPC; JPL
2017 QQ_{131}	28 August 2017	DECam (W84)	94	cubewano (cold)	43.5	0.08	3	40.0	47.0	albedo: 0.152	MPC; JPL
2017 QU_{131}	22 August 2017	DECam (W84)	97	SDO	50.4	0.27	23	37.0	63.7	albedo: 0.124	MPC; JPL
2017 QU_{218}	18 August 2017	COIAS,Subaru Telescope (T09)	89	SDO	49.5	0.26	33	36.6	62.4	albedo: 0.124	MPC; JPL
2017 QV_{218}	19 August 2017	COIAS,Subaru Telescope (T09)	117	SDO	49.5	0.23	23	38.4	60.6	albedo: 0.124	MPC; JPL
2017 QV_{219}	19 August 2017	COIAS,Subaru Telescope (T09)	66	SDO	46.3	0.28	20	33.1	59.4	albedo: 0.124	MPC; JPL
2017 RY_{137}	14 September 2017	DECam (W84)	130	cubewano (hot)?	45.7	0.16	33	38.3	53.1	albedo: 0.079	MPC; JPL
2017 RZ_{137}	14 September 2017	DECam (W84)	130	cubewano (hot)?	46.1	0.21	17	36.4	55.9	albedo: 0.079	MPC; JPL
2017 SE_{277}	27 September 2017	DECam (W84)	111	res · 1:5?	87.8	0.55	31	39.9	135.7	albedo: 0.126	MPC; JPL
2017 SE_{279}	27 September 2017	DECam (W84)	104	SDO	144.2	0.74	12	37.1	251.3	albedo: 0.124	MPC; JPL
2017 SK_{381}	17 September 2017	COIAS,Subaru Telescope (T09)	84	other TNO	38.6	0.10	13	34.9	42.3	albedo: 0.13	MPC; JPL
2017 SN_{132}	16 September 2017	Maunakea (568)	261	SDO	96.6	0.60	24	38.6	154.5	albedo: 0.124	MPC; JPL
2017 SN_{33}	19 September 2017	Pan-STARRS 1 (F51)	1.6	damocloid	275.8	0.99	152	1.8	549.8	albedo: 0.048	MPC; JPL
2017 SQ_{385}	27 September 2017	COIAS,Subaru Telescope (T09)	96	SDO	57.3	0.37	24	36.3	78.4	albedo: 0.124	MPC; JPL
2017 SZ_{118}	25 September 2017	Pan-STARRS 1 (F51)	1.1	damocloid	34.1	0.95	3	1.6	66.6	albedo: 0.048	MPC; JPL
2017 UR_{52}	29 October 2017	University of Arizona Mt. Lemmon Survey (G96)	0.3	amor	324.2	1.00	108	1.3	647.2	albedo: 0.048	MPC; JPL
2017 UW_{51}	23 October 2017	Mt. Lemmon Survey (G96)	5	damocloid	133.2	0.98	144	3.2	263.2	albedo: 0.048	MPC; JPL
2017 UX_{51}	27 October 2017	Pan-STARRS 1 (F51)	35	centaur	30.6	0.75	90	7.6	53.7	albedo: 0.058	MPC; JPL
2017 VO_{34}	15 November 2017	Cerro Tololo Observatory, La Serena (807)	131	SDO	52.3	0.32	41	35.5	69.0	albedo: 0.124	MPC; JPL
2017 WH_{30}	17 November 2017	Cerro Tololo Observatory, La Serena (807)	169	SDO	86.9	0.62	18	33.3	140.6	albedo: 0.124	MPC; JPL
2017 YG_{5}	23 December 2017	Pan-STARRS 1 (F51)	17	centaur	68.4	0.89	24	7.4	129.4	albedo: 0.058	MPC; JPL
2017 YL_{4}	24 December 2017	Pan-STARRS 1 (F51)	7	damocloid	148.5	0.97	89	4.3	292.7	albedo: 0.048	MPC; JPL

back to top
