= List of unnumbered trans-Neptunian objects: 2016 =

The following is a partial list of unnumbered trans-Neptunian objects for principal designations assigned within 2016. As of November 2026, it contains a total of 407 bodies. For more information see the description on the main page. Also see list for the previous and next year.

== 2016 ==
| Designation | First Observed (discovered) | | D (km) | Orbital description | | | | | | Remarks | Refs |
| Designation | Date | Observer (Site) | D (km) | Class | a (AU) | e | i (°) | q (AU) | Q (AU) | Remarks | Refs |
|---|---|---|---|---|---|---|---|---|---|---|---|
| 2016 AB_{401} | 9 January 2016 | COIAS,Subaru Telescope (T09) | 74 | other TNO | 47.0 | 0.20 | 21 | 37.6 | 56.4 | albedo: 0.13 | MPC; JPL |
| 2016 AB_{402} | 11 January 2016 | COIAS,Subaru Telescope (T09) | 55 | SDO | 138.6 | 0.74 | 15 | 36.4 | 240.8 | albedo: 0.124 | MPC; JPL |
| 2016 AF_{402} | 11 January 2016 | COIAS,Subaru Telescope (T09) | 181 | cubewano (hot)? | 43.2 | 0.10 | 26 | 38.9 | 47.5 | albedo: 0.079 | MPC; JPL |
| 2016 AG_{401} | 9 January 2016 | COIAS,Subaru Telescope (T09) | 163 | centaur | 36.6 | 0.34 | 27 | 24.3 | 48.9 | albedo: 0.058 | MPC; JPL |
| 2016 AG_{402} | 11 January 2016 | COIAS,Subaru Telescope (T09) | 42 | centaur | 79.2 | 0.78 | 14 | 17.9 | 140.6 | albedo: 0.058 | MPC; JPL |
| 2016 AN_{278} | 12 January 2016 | Pan-STARRS 1 (F51) | 191 | cubewano (hot)? | 47.4 | 0.22 | 7 | 36.8 | 57.9 | albedo: 0.079 | MPC; JPL |
| 2016 AQ_{394} | 12 January 2016 | COIAS,Subaru Telescope (T09) | 87 | other TNO | 40.8 | 0.07 | 19 | 37.9 | 43.7 | albedo: 0.13 | MPC; JPL |
| 2016 AT_{281} | 8 January 2016 | Pan-STARRS 1 (F51) | 5 | damocloid | 60.6 | 0.96 | 22 | 2.7 | 118.4 | albedo: 0.048 | MPC; JPL |
| 2016 AU_{404} | 15 January 2016 | COIAS,Subaru Telescope (T09) | 65 | other TNO | 35.7 | 0.10 | 30 | 32.1 | 39.2 | albedo: 0.13 | MPC; JPL |
| 2016 AW_{401} | 15 January 2016 | COIAS,Subaru Telescope (T09) | 118 | SDO | 76.8 | 0.48 | 36 | 39.8 | 113.9 | albedo: 0.124 | MPC; JPL |
| 2016 AX_{401} | 15 January 2016 | COIAS,Subaru Telescope (T09) | 186 | cubewano (hot)? | 41.6 | 0.07 | 13 | 38.6 | 44.5 | albedo: 0.079 | MPC; JPL |
| 2016 AY_{401} | 12 January 2016 | COIAS,Subaru Telescope (T09) | 89 | cubewano (hot)? | 45.9 | 0.17 | 14 | 38.0 | 53.8 | albedo: 0.079 | MPC; JPL |
| 2016 CD_{289} | 5 February 2016 | S. S. Sheppard (568) | 132 | other TNO | 53.2 | 0.25 | 31 | 40.0 | 66.4 | albedo: 0.13 | MPC; JPL |
| 2016 CG_{437} | 8 February 2016 | COIAS,Subaru Telescope (T09) | 83 | other TNO | 42.5 | 0.18 | 12 | 34.8 | 50.1 | albedo: 0.13 | MPC; JPL |
| 2016 CG_{438} | 6 February 2016 | COIAS,Subaru Telescope (T09) | 113 | centaur | 78.6 | 0.67 | 17 | 25.9 | 131.2 | albedo: 0.058 | MPC; JPL |
| 2016 CJ_{438} | 8 February 2016 | COIAS,Subaru Telescope (T09) | 75 | other TNO | 69.2 | 0.37 | 33 | 43.5 | 95.0 | albedo: 0.13 | MPC; JPL |
| 2016 CK_{438} | 8 February 2016 | COIAS,Subaru Telescope (T09) | 73 | other TNO | 48.1 | 0.24 | 18 | 36.5 | 59.7 | albedo: 0.13 | MPC; JPL |
| 2016 CN_{323} | 5 February 2016 | Maunakea (568) | 145 | SDO | 100.9 | 0.66 | 13 | 34.8 | 166.9 | albedo: 0.124 | MPC; JPL |
| 2016 CO_{264} | 14 February 2016 | Pan-STARRS 1 (F51) | 3 | damocloid | 47.0 | 0.94 | 130 | 3.0 | 90.9 | albedo: 0.048 | MPC; JPL |
| 2016 CQ_{433} | 8 February 2016 | COIAS,Subaru Telescope (T09) | 59 | other TNO | 47.6 | 0.24 | 23 | 36.4 | 58.8 | albedo: 0.13 | MPC; JPL |
| 2016 CR_{433} | 6 February 2016 | COIAS,Subaru Telescope (T09) | 34 | other TNO | 43.6 | 0.28 | 22 | 31.3 | 56.0 | albedo: 0.13 | MPC; JPL |
| 2016 CS_{433} | 8 February 2016 | COIAS,Subaru Telescope (T09) | 60 | other TNO | 40.4 | 0.03 | 15 | 39.3 | 41.5 | albedo: 0.13 | MPC; JPL |
| 2016 CY_{430} | 8 February 2016 | COIAS,Subaru Telescope (T09) | 146 | cubewano (hot)? | 41.6 | 0.06 | 16 | 39.1 | 44.2 | albedo: 0.079 | MPC; JPL |
| 2016 EA_{367} | 4 March 2016 | COIAS,Subaru Telescope (T09) | 78 | other TNO | 38.2 | 0.11 | 33 | 34.1 | 42.2 | albedo: 0.13 | MPC; JPL |
| 2016 EA_{391} | 4 March 2016 | COIAS,Subaru Telescope (T09) | 222 | SDO | 53.9 | 0.17 | 18 | 44.7 | 63.1 | albedo: 0.124 | MPC; JPL |
| 2016 EB_{364} | 7 March 2016 | COIAS,Subaru Telescope (T09) | 82 | centaur | 51.4 | 0.47 | 11 | 27.2 | 75.5 | albedo: 0.058 | MPC; JPL |
| 2016 EB_{366} | 7 March 2016 | COIAS,Subaru Telescope (T09) | 116 | SDO | 56.5 | 0.40 | 11 | 33.7 | 79.4 | albedo: 0.124 | MPC; JPL |
| 2016 EB_{367} | 7 March 2016 | COIAS,Subaru Telescope (T09) | 211 | cubewano (hot)? | 45.6 | 0.17 | 11 | 38.0 | 53.3 | albedo: 0.079 | MPC; JPL |
| 2016 EB_{369} | 9 March 2016 | COIAS,Subaru Telescope (T09) | 114 | SDO | 69.3 | 0.53 | 16 | 32.5 | 106.2 | albedo: 0.124 | MPC; JPL |
| 2016 EB_{391} | 7 March 2016 | COIAS,Subaru Telescope (T09) | 42 | SDO | 49.5 | 0.16 | 25 | 41.7 | 57.4 | albedo: 0.124 | MPC; JPL |
| 2016 EC_{366} | 4 March 2016 | COIAS,Subaru Telescope (T09) | 97 | SDO | 161.3 | 0.76 | 37 | 38.7 | 283.8 | albedo: 0.124 | MPC; JPL |
| 2016 EC_{369} | 12 March 2016 | COIAS,Subaru Telescope (T09) | 81 | SDO | 56.3 | 0.35 | 17 | 36.8 | 75.7 | albedo: 0.124 | MPC; JPL |
| 2016 EC_{391} | 4 March 2016 | COIAS,Subaru Telescope (T09) | 81 | other TNO | 52.7 | 0.29 | 38 | 37.6 | 67.9 | albedo: 0.13 | MPC; JPL |
| 2016 EC_{404} | 7 March 2016 | COIAS,Subaru Telescope (T09) | 76 | cubewano (hot)? | 41.3 | 0.10 | 31 | 37.1 | 45.6 | albedo: 0.079 | MPC; JPL |
| 2016 ED_{366} | 4 March 2016 | COIAS,Subaru Telescope (T09) | 74 | other TNO | 46.8 | 0.34 | 22 | 30.9 | 62.6 | albedo: 0.13 | MPC; JPL |
| 2016 ED_{367} | 4 March 2016 | COIAS,Subaru Telescope (T09) | 56 | cubewano (cold)? | 43.6 | 0.13 | 4 | 37.9 | 49.3 | albedo: 0.152 | MPC; JPL |
| 2016 ED_{391} | 4 March 2016 | COIAS,Subaru Telescope (T09) | 80 | SDO | 75.2 | 0.52 | 18 | 36.4 | 113.9 | albedo: 0.124 | MPC; JPL |
| 2016 ED_{404} | 4 March 2016 | COIAS,Subaru Telescope (T09) | 43 | other TNO | 45.0 | 0.22 | 12 | 35.3 | 54.7 | albedo: 0.13 | MPC; JPL |
| 2016 EE_{366} | 7 March 2016 | COIAS,Subaru Telescope (T09) | 121 | centaur | 97.9 | 0.70 | 11 | 29.0 | 166.8 | albedo: 0.058 | MPC; JPL |
| 2016 EE_{367} | 4 March 2016 | COIAS,Subaru Telescope (T09) | 137 | SDO | 74.8 | 0.52 | 10 | 35.7 | 113.9 | albedo: 0.124 | MPC; JPL |
| 2016 EE_{391} | 4 March 2016 | COIAS,Subaru Telescope (T09) | 106 | other TNO | 38.4 | 0.10 | 20 | 34.5 | 42.3 | albedo: 0.13 | MPC; JPL |
| 2016 EE_{403} | 7 March 2016 | COIAS,Subaru Telescope (T09) | 101 | cubewano (hot)? | 40.2 | 0.08 | 14 | 36.9 | 43.5 | albedo: 0.079 | MPC; JPL |
| 2016 EF_{364} | 7 March 2016 | COIAS,Subaru Telescope (T09) | 84 | other TNO | 40.6 | 0.11 | 20 | 36.0 | 45.1 | albedo: 0.13 | MPC; JPL |
| 2016 EF_{366} | 7 March 2016 | COIAS,Subaru Telescope (T09) | 159 | plutino | 39.3 | 0.18 | 18 | 32.2 | 46.5 | albedo: 0.074 | MPC; JPL |
| 2016 EF_{367} | 9 March 2016 | COIAS,Subaru Telescope (T09) | 67 | SDO | 79.2 | 0.56 | 15 | 35.0 | 123.3 | albedo: 0.124 | MPC; JPL |
| 2016 EF_{391} | 7 March 2016 | COIAS,Subaru Telescope (T09) | 123 | plutino | 39.5 | 0.21 | 16 | 31.0 | 47.9 | albedo: 0.074 | MPC; JPL |
| 2016 EG_{364} | 7 March 2016 | COIAS,Subaru Telescope (T09) | 83 | cubewano (hot)? | 43.0 | 0.22 | 16 | 33.3 | 52.6 | albedo: 0.079 | MPC; JPL |
| 2016 EG_{366} | 7 March 2016 | COIAS,Subaru Telescope (T09) | 86 | SDO | 70.1 | 0.42 | 34 | 40.5 | 99.7 | albedo: 0.124 | MPC; JPL |
| 2016 EG_{397} | 9 March 2016 | COIAS,Subaru Telescope (T09) | 76 | other TNO | 50.5 | 0.10 | 19 | 45.3 | 55.8 | albedo: 0.13 | MPC; JPL |
| 2016 EH_{362} | 4 March 2016 | COIAS,Subaru Telescope (T09) | 68 | centaur | 68.2 | 0.78 | 8 | 15.0 | 121.4 | albedo: 0.058 | MPC; JPL |
| 2016 EJ_{203} | 11 March 2016 | Mt. Lemmon Survey (G96) | 1.5 | damocloid | 64.8 | 0.96 | 171 | 2.8 | 126.9 | albedo: 0.048 | MPC; JPL |
| 2016 EJ_{398} | 4 March 2016 | COIAS,Subaru Telescope (T09) | 96 | other TNO | 37.9 | 0.10 | 27 | 34.0 | 41.9 | albedo: 0.13 | MPC; JPL |
| 2016 EK_{400} | 7 March 2016 | COIAS,Subaru Telescope (T09) | 83 | SDO | 96.3 | 0.61 | 18 | 37.4 | 155.1 | albedo: 0.124 | MPC; JPL |
| 2016 EL_{398} | 4 March 2016 | COIAS,Subaru Telescope (T09) | 83 | SDO | 60.4 | 0.39 | 11 | 37.0 | 83.7 | albedo: 0.124 | MPC; JPL |
| 2016 EL_{408} | — | — | — | — | 54.9 | 0.30 | 32 | 38.5 | 71.3 | — | MPC; JPL |
| 2016 EM_{368} | 4 March 2016 | COIAS,Subaru Telescope (T09) | 96 | centaur | 39.9 | 0.19 | 17 | 32.2 | 47.6 | albedo: 0.058 | MPC; JPL |
| 2016 EN_{370} | 12 March 2016 | COIAS,Subaru Telescope (T09) | 3 | damocloid | 72.0 | 0.95 | 57 | 3.4 | 140.6 | albedo: 0.048 | MPC; JPL |
| 2016 EN_{408} | — | — | — | — | 41.5 | 0.04 | 21 | 39.7 | 43.4 | — | MPC; JPL |
| 2016 EO_{398} | 7 March 2016 | COIAS,Subaru Telescope (T09) | 113 | SDO | 54.2 | 0.34 | 27 | 35.9 | 72.5 | albedo: 0.124 | MPC; JPL |
| 2016 EO_{408} | — | — | — | — | 39.4 | 0.19 | 24 | 32.1 | 46.7 | — | MPC; JPL |
| 2016 EP_{398} | 4 March 2016 | COIAS,Subaru Telescope (T09) | 89 | SDO | 79.5 | 0.53 | 25 | 37.6 | 121.5 | albedo: 0.124 | MPC; JPL |
| 2016 EP_{408} | — | — | — | — | 46.7 | 0.24 | 10 | 35.6 | 57.9 | — | MPC; JPL |
| 2016 EQ_{398} | 12 March 2016 | COIAS,Subaru Telescope (T09) | 115 | centaur | 91.5 | 0.75 | 31 | 22.9 | 160.1 | albedo: 0.058 | MPC; JPL |
| 2016 EQ_{408} | — | — | — | — | 48.1 | 0.29 | 8 | 34.3 | 61.8 | — | MPC; JPL |
| 2016 ER_{398} | 4 March 2016 | COIAS,Subaru Telescope (T09) | 72 | SDO | 56.2 | 0.29 | 13 | 39.8 | 72.6 | albedo: 0.124 | MPC; JPL |
| 2016 ER_{403} | 4 March 2016 | COIAS,Subaru Telescope (T09) | 61 | cubewano (hot)? | 42.9 | 0.09 | 16 | 39.2 | 46.6 | albedo: 0.079 | MPC; JPL |
| 2016 ER_{408} | — | — | — | — | 44.4 | 0.14 | 14 | 38.0 | 50.8 | — | MPC; JPL |
| 2016 ES_{367} | 7 March 2016 | COIAS,Subaru Telescope (T09) | 83 | cubewano (hot)? | 44.7 | 0.08 | 10 | 41.1 | 48.4 | albedo: 0.079 | MPC; JPL |
| 2016 ES_{398} | 4 March 2016 | COIAS,Subaru Telescope (T09) | 88 | SDO | 64.3 | 0.37 | 21 | 40.4 | 88.2 | albedo: 0.124 | MPC; JPL |
| 2016 ES_{403} | 9 March 2016 | COIAS,Subaru Telescope (T09) | 149 | centaur | 132.9 | 0.83 | 32 | 22.8 | 242.9 | albedo: 0.058 | MPC; JPL |
| 2016 ET_{402} | 12 March 2016 | COIAS,Subaru Telescope (T09) | 105 | centaur | 106.1 | 0.79 | 33 | 22.1 | 190.1 | albedo: 0.058 | MPC; JPL |
| 2016 EU_{398} | 7 March 2016 | COIAS,Subaru Telescope (T09) | 97 | cubewano (hot)? | 41.9 | 0.03 | 16 | 40.8 | 43.1 | albedo: 0.079 | MPC; JPL |
| 2016 EU_{402} | 12 March 2016 | COIAS,Subaru Telescope (T09) | 115 | SDO | 55.8 | 0.43 | 19 | 31.9 | 79.8 | albedo: 0.124 | MPC; JPL |
| 2016 EV_{402} | 12 March 2016 | COIAS,Subaru Telescope (T09) | 106 | SDO | 35.4 | 0.28 | 18 | 25.6 | 45.2 | albedo: 0.124 | MPC; JPL |
| 2016 EW_{391} | 7 March 2016 | COIAS,Subaru Telescope (T09) | 85 | twotino | 48.2 | 0.15 | 11 | 40.9 | 55.4 | albedo: 0.126 | MPC; JPL |
| 2016 EW_{392} | 4 March 2016 | COIAS,Subaru Telescope (T09) | 71 | cubewano (hot)? | 42.4 | 0.09 | 24 | 38.5 | 46.3 | albedo: 0.079 | MPC; JPL |
| 2016 EW_{397} | 4 March 2016 | COIAS,Subaru Telescope (T09) | 130 | other TNO | 44.9 | 0.20 | 13 | 35.9 | 53.9 | albedo: 0.13 | MPC; JPL |
| 2016 EX_{390} | 4 March 2016 | COIAS,Subaru Telescope (T09) | 59 | cubewano (hot)? | 43.1 | 0.10 | 29 | 38.7 | 47.6 | albedo: 0.079 | MPC; JPL |
| 2016 EX_{392} | 9 March 2016 | COIAS,Subaru Telescope (T09) | 96 | SDO | 60.6 | 0.38 | 23 | 37.7 | 83.6 | albedo: 0.124 | MPC; JPL |
| 2016 EX_{395} | 4 March 2016 | COIAS,Subaru Telescope (T09) | 120 | cubewano (hot)? | 46.2 | 0.10 | 11 | 41.6 | 50.8 | albedo: 0.079 | MPC; JPL |
| 2016 EY_{390} | 4 March 2016 | COIAS,Subaru Telescope (T09) | 70 | SDO | 46.2 | 0.10 | 24 | 41.4 | 50.9 | albedo: 0.124 | MPC; JPL |
| 2016 EZ_{365} | 7 March 2016 | COIAS,Subaru Telescope (T09) | 108 | cubewano (hot)? | 42.6 | 0.03 | 11 | 41.2 | 44.0 | albedo: 0.079 | MPC; JPL |
| 2016 EZ_{370} | 9 March 2016 | COIAS,Subaru Telescope (T09) | 52 | SDO | 51.8 | 0.29 | 14 | 36.9 | 66.8 | albedo: 0.124 | MPC; JPL |
| 2016 EZ_{390} | 4 March 2016 | COIAS,Subaru Telescope (T09) | 78 | other TNO | 38.6 | 0.10 | 21 | 34.7 | 42.6 | albedo: 0.13 | MPC; JPL |
| 2016 FA_{59} | 28 March 2016 | DECam (W84) | 107 | other TNO | 41.3 | 0.14 | 23 | 35.6 | 47.0 | albedo: 0.13 | MPC; JPL |
| 2016 FA_{60} | 30 March 2016 | DECam (W84) | 59 | other TNO | 36.3 | 0.10 | 25 | 32.6 | 40.1 | albedo: 0.13 | MPC; JPL |
| 2016 FB_{59} | 28 March 2016 | DECam (W84) | 82 | cubewano (hot)? | 59.7 | 0.37 | 18 | 37.8 | 81.6 | albedo: 0.079 | MPC; JPL |
| 2016 FB_{60} | 30 March 2016 | DECam (W84) | 84 | cubewano (hot)? | 53.6 | 0.31 | 10 | 37.0 | 70.1 | albedo: 0.079 | MPC; JPL |
| 2016 FC_{59} | 28 March 2016 | DECam (W84) | 130 | cubewano (hot)? | 62.5 | 0.37 | 16 | 39.6 | 85.4 | albedo: 0.079 | MPC; JPL |
| 2016 FC_{60} | 30 March 2016 | DECam (W84) | 120 | res · 3:5 | 42.3 | 0.19 | 8 | 34.3 | 50.4 | albedo: 0.126 | MPC; JPL |
| 2016 FD_{59} | 28 March 2016 | DECam (W84) | 48 | SDO | 40.2 | 0.51 | 24 | 19.9 | 60.6 | albedo: 0.124 | MPC; JPL |
| 2016 FD_{60} | 30 March 2016 | DECam (W84) | 176 | cubewano (hot)? | 45.9 | 0.21 | 16 | 36.5 | 55.3 | albedo: 0.079 | MPC; JPL |
| 2016 FE_{186} | 16 March 2016 | COIAS,Subaru Telescope (T09) | 99 | other TNO | 44.7 | 0.19 | 30 | 36.4 | 53.1 | albedo: 0.13 | MPC; JPL |
| 2016 FE_{59} | 28 March 2016 | DECam (W84) | 84 | cubewano (hot)? | 67.8 | 0.46 | 10 | 36.5 | 99.1 | albedo: 0.079 | MPC; JPL |
| 2016 FE_{60} | 30 March 2016 | DECam (W84) | 117 | other TNO | 34.1 | 0.10 | 10 | 30.5 | 37.6 | albedo: 0.13 | MPC; JPL |
| 2016 FF_{185} | 16 March 2016 | COIAS,Subaru Telescope (T09) | 72 | centaur | 40.4 | 0.32 | 12 | 27.7 | 53.1 | albedo: 0.058 | MPC; JPL |
| 2016 FF_{186} | 16 March 2016 | COIAS,Subaru Telescope (T09) | 54 | other TNO | 48.0 | 0.25 | 11 | 35.8 | 60.2 | albedo: 0.13 | MPC; JPL |
| 2016 FF_{59} | 28 March 2016 | DECam (W84) | 176 | cubewano (hot)? | 94.9 | 0.61 | 11 | 37.5 | 152.3 | albedo: 0.079 | MPC; JPL |
| 2016 FG_{186} | 16 March 2016 | COIAS,Subaru Telescope (T09) | 100 | other TNO | 50.3 | 0.25 | 11 | 37.6 | 62.9 | albedo: 0.13 | MPC; JPL |
| 2016 FG_{59} | 28 March 2016 | DECam (W84) | 160 | SDO | 62.4 | 0.29 | 25 | 44.5 | 80.3 | albedo: 0.124 | MPC; JPL |
| 2016 FH_{59} | 28 March 2016 | DECam (W84) | 129 | cubewano (hot)? | 94.4 | 0.60 | 15 | 37.9 | 150.8 | albedo: 0.079 | MPC; JPL |
| 2016 FJ_{59} | 28 March 2016 | DECam (W84) | 120 | other TNO | 36.5 | 0.11 | 24 | 32.6 | 40.3 | albedo: 0.13 | MPC; JPL |
| 2016 FK_{164} | 6 May 2016 | Cerro Tololo Observatory, La Serena (807) | 374 | cubewano (hot) | 44.2 | 0.14 | 28 | 38.1 | 50.3 | albedo: 0.079 | MPC; JPL |
| 2016 FK_{185} | 16 March 2016 | COIAS,Subaru Telescope (T09) | 152 | cubewano (hot)? | 46.6 | 0.22 | 17 | 36.5 | 56.7 | albedo: 0.079 | MPC; JPL |
| 2016 FL_{185} | 16 March 2016 | COIAS,Subaru Telescope (T09) | 70 | SDO | 101.7 | 0.69 | 19 | 32.0 | 171.4 | albedo: 0.124 | MPC; JPL |
| 2016 FL_{59} | 28 March 2016 | DECam (W84) | 198 | cubewano (hot) | 43.2 | 0.03 | 7 | 42.0 | 44.5 | albedo: 0.079 | MPC; JPL |
| 2016 FM_{59} | 28 March 2016 | DECam (W84) | 44 | SDO | 107.3 | 0.72 | 21 | 30.0 | 184.6 | albedo: 0.124 | MPC; JPL |
| 2016 FO_{59} | 28 March 2016 | DECam (W84) | 120 | SDO | 57.2 | 0.36 | 19 | 36.6 | 77.7 | albedo: 0.124 | MPC; JPL |
| 2016 FQ_{59} | 28 March 2016 | DECam (W84) | 132 | cubewano (hot)? | 65.6 | 0.39 | 16 | 40.1 | 91.2 | albedo: 0.079 | MPC; JPL |
| 2016 FR_{203} | 16 March 2016 | COIAS,Subaru Telescope (T09) | 172 | centaur | 47.0 | 0.41 | 20 | 27.8 | 66.2 | albedo: 0.058 | MPC; JPL |
| 2016 FS_{59} | 29 March 2016 | DECam (W84) | 40 | SDO | 159.0 | 0.81 | 22 | 30.0 | 288.1 | albedo: 0.124 | MPC; JPL |
| 2016 FT_{58} | 28 March 2016 | Cerro Tololo-DECam (W84) | 130 | cubewano (hot)? | 42.0 | 0.03 | 15 | 40.9 | 43.0 | albedo: 0.079 | MPC; JPL |
| 2016 FT_{59} | 29 March 2016 | DECam (W84) | 131 | cubewano (hot)? | 59.2 | 0.26 | 16 | 43.7 | 74.7 | albedo: 0.079 | MPC; JPL |
| 2016 FU_{58} | 28 March 2016 | DECam (W84) | 162 | cubewano (hot) | 43.4 | 0.14 | 24 | 37.1 | 49.6 | albedo: 0.079 | MPC; JPL |
| 2016 FU_{59} | 29 March 2016 | DECam (W84) | 131 | SDO | 46.9 | 0.11 | 22 | 41.9 | 51.8 | albedo: 0.124 | MPC; JPL |
| 2016 FV_{58} | 28 March 2016 | DECam (W84) | 130 | cubewano (hot)? | 45.9 | 0.11 | 8 | 40.8 | 51.1 | albedo: 0.079 | MPC; JPL |
| 2016 FV_{59} | 29 March 2016 | DECam (W84) | 120 | other TNO | 51.0 | 0.24 | 9 | 39.0 | 62.9 | albedo: 0.13 | MPC; JPL |
| 2016 FW_{58} | 28 March 2016 | DECam (W84) | 114 | cubewano (hot)? | 97.2 | 0.62 | 17 | 37.3 | 157.0 | albedo: 0.079 | MPC; JPL |
| 2016 FX_{185} | 16 March 2016 | COIAS,Subaru Telescope (T09) | 202 | SDO | 76.2 | 0.53 | 10 | 36.1 | 116.3 | albedo: 0.124 | MPC; JPL |
| 2016 FX_{58} | 28 March 2016 | DECam (W84) | 260 | SDO | 54.5 | 0.28 | 23 | 39.1 | 69.9 | albedo: 0.124 | MPC; JPL |
| 2016 FX_{59} | 29 March 2016 | DECam (W84) | 115 | cubewano (hot)? | 44.7 | 0.10 | 29 | 40.4 | 49.0 | albedo: 0.079 | MPC; JPL |
| 2016 FY_{185} | 28 March 2016 | Cerro Tololo-DECam (W84) | 231 | centaur | 90.0 | 0.72 | 17 | 24.8 | 155.2 | albedo: 0.058 | MPC; JPL |
| 2016 FY_{58} | 28 March 2016 | DECam (W84) | 91 | cubewano (hot)? | 42.1 | 0.08 | 14 | 38.6 | 45.6 | albedo: 0.079 | MPC; JPL |
| 2016 FY_{59} | 29 March 2016 | DECam (W84) | 158 | cubewano (hot)? | 37.2 | 0.10 | 35 | 33.3 | 41.1 | albedo: 0.079 | MPC; JPL |
| 2016 FZ_{58} | 28 March 2016 | DECam (W84) | 211 | cubewano (hot)? | 47.7 | 0.10 | 9 | 43.0 | 52.4 | albedo: 0.079 | MPC; JPL |
| 2016 FZ_{59} | 30 March 2016 | DECam (W84) | 117 | cubewano (hot)? | 34.9 | 0.11 | 21 | 31.2 | 38.6 | albedo: 0.079 | MPC; JPL |
| 2016 GA_{277} | 10 April 2016 | Maunakea (568) | 114 | SDO | 153.1 | 0.77 | 19 | 36.0 | 270.3 | albedo: 0.124 | MPC; JPL |
| 2016 GA_{369} | 2 April 2016 | COIAS,Subaru Telescope (T09) | 117 | centaur | 135.3 | 0.85 | 31 | 20.2 | 250.3 | albedo: 0.058 | MPC; JPL |
| 2016 GA_{371} | 11 April 2016 | COIAS,Subaru Telescope (T09) | 85 | cubewano (hot)? | 42.2 | 0.11 | 15 | 37.6 | 46.9 | albedo: 0.079 | MPC; JPL |
| 2016 GA_{391} | 2 April 2016 | COIAS,Subaru Telescope (T09) | 128 | SDO | 78.9 | 0.10 | 6 | 70.9 | 86.8 | albedo: 0.124 | MPC; JPL |
| 2016 GA_{394} | 2 April 2016 | COIAS,Subaru Telescope (T09) | 70 | cubewano (cold)? | 45.3 | 0.10 | 3 | 40.8 | 49.7 | albedo: 0.152 | MPC; JPL |
| 2016 GA_{399} | 4 April 2016 | COIAS,Subaru Telescope (T09) | 51 | other TNO | 39.2 | 0.15 | 17 | 33.2 | 45.1 | albedo: 0.13 | MPC; JPL |
| 2016 GB_{277} | 10 April 2016 | Maunakea (568) | 137 | SDO | 79.0 | 0.49 | 31 | 40.3 | 117.7 | albedo: 0.124 | MPC; JPL |
| 2016 GB_{394} | 2 April 2016 | COIAS,Subaru Telescope (T09) | 78 | cubewano (cold)? | 39.9 | 0.11 | 3 | 35.7 | 44.1 | albedo: 0.152 | MPC; JPL |
| 2016 GB_{404} | — | — | — | — | 66.9 | 0.43 | 24 | 38.1 | 95.7 | — | MPC; JPL |
| 2016 GC_{369} | 11 April 2016 | COIAS,Subaru Telescope (T09) | 66 | cubewano (hot)? | 45.6 | 0.17 | 15 | 37.8 | 53.4 | albedo: 0.079 | MPC; JPL |
| 2016 GC_{391} | 2 April 2016 | COIAS,Subaru Telescope (T09) | 58 | cubewano (cold)? | 42.8 | 0.10 | 2 | 38.4 | 47.1 | albedo: 0.152 | MPC; JPL |
| 2016 GC_{394} | 2 April 2016 | COIAS,Subaru Telescope (T09) | 44 | cubewano (cold)? | 41.7 | 0.11 | 1 | 37.3 | 46.2 | albedo: 0.152 | MPC; JPL |
| 2016 GD_{369} | 8 April 2016 | COIAS,Subaru Telescope (T09) | 90 | SDO | 64.6 | 0.38 | 26 | 40.3 | 89.0 | albedo: 0.124 | MPC; JPL |
| 2016 GD_{394} | 2 April 2016 | COIAS,Subaru Telescope (T09) | 38 | other TNO | 34.4 | 0.10 | 11 | 30.8 | 38.0 | albedo: 0.13 | MPC; JPL |
| 2016 GD_{399} | 11 April 2016 | COIAS,Subaru Telescope (T09) | 73 | centaur | 86.7 | 0.69 | 20 | 26.8 | 146.6 | albedo: 0.058 | MPC; JPL |
| 2016 GE_{370} | 11 April 2016 | COIAS,Subaru Telescope (T09) | 134 | cubewano (hot)? | 40.4 | 0.01 | 13 | 40.0 | 40.7 | albedo: 0.079 | MPC; JPL |
| 2016 GF_{391} | 2 April 2016 | COIAS,Subaru Telescope (T09) | 74 | SDO | 72.6 | 0.61 | 0 | 28.6 | 116.6 | albedo: 0.124 | MPC; JPL |
| 2016 GG_{370} | 4 April 2016 | COIAS,Subaru Telescope (T09) | 61 | cubewano (cold)? | 42.7 | 0.13 | 3 | 37.0 | 48.4 | albedo: 0.152 | MPC; JPL |
| 2016 GG_{393} | 2 April 2016 | COIAS,Subaru Telescope (T09) | 102 | cubewano (cold)? | 44.3 | 0.06 | 2 | 41.5 | 47.1 | albedo: 0.152 | MPC; JPL |
| 2016 GG_{399} | 11 April 2016 | COIAS,Subaru Telescope (T09) | 37 | centaur | 33.3 | 0.10 | 27 | 30.0 | 36.6 | albedo: 0.058 | MPC; JPL |
| 2016 GG_{407} | — | — | — | — | 32.3 | 0.10 | 28 | 28.9 | 35.7 | — | MPC; JPL |
| 2016 GH_{370} | 2 April 2016 | COIAS,Subaru Telescope (T09) | 105 | centaur | 293.9 | 0.91 | 2 | 26.5 | 561.3 | albedo: 0.058 | MPC; JPL |
| 2016 GH_{399} | 11 April 2016 | COIAS,Subaru Telescope (T09) | 73 | centaur | 132.0 | 0.82 | 13 | 23.7 | 240.2 | albedo: 0.058 | MPC; JPL |
| 2016 GJ_{365} | 2 April 2016 | COIAS,Subaru Telescope (T09) | 76 | cubewano (cold)? | 43.3 | 0.04 | 2 | 41.5 | 45.2 | albedo: 0.152 | MPC; JPL |
| 2016 GJ_{370} | 2 April 2016 | COIAS,Subaru Telescope (T09) | 80 | centaur | 197.5 | 0.89 | 14 | 22.3 | 372.7 | albedo: 0.058 | MPC; JPL |
| 2016 GK_{368} | 2 April 2016 | COIAS,Subaru Telescope (T09) | 45 | SDO | 61.5 | 0.46 | 11 | 33.0 | 89.9 | albedo: 0.124 | MPC; JPL |
| 2016 GK_{370} | 2 April 2016 | COIAS,Subaru Telescope (T09) | 51 | centaur | 118.7 | 0.85 | 2 | 17.7 | 219.6 | albedo: 0.058 | MPC; JPL |
| 2016 GL_{368} | 2 April 2016 | COIAS,Subaru Telescope (T09) | 78 | cubewano (cold)? | 43.7 | 0.03 | 1 | 42.6 | 44.8 | albedo: 0.152 | MPC; JPL |
| 2016 GL_{407} | — | — | — | — | 45.6 | 0.11 | 2.2 | 40.8 | 50.4 | — | MPC; JPL |
| 2016 GM_{407} | — | — | — | — | 44.0 | 0.05 | 3.4 | 41.7 | 46.4 | — | MPC; JPL |
| 2016 GO_{407} | — | — | — | — | 40.2 | 0.11 | 1 | 35.8 | 44.5 | — | MPC; JPL |
| 2016 GR_{367} | 8 April 2016 | COIAS,Subaru Telescope (T09) | 60 | other TNO | 44.9 | 0.22 | 11 | 34.9 | 54.9 | albedo: 0.13 | MPC; JPL |
| 2016 GR_{368} | 8 April 2016 | COIAS,Subaru Telescope (T09) | 153 | cubewano (hot)? | 44.2 | 0.12 | 18 | 38.7 | 49.7 | albedo: 0.079 | MPC; JPL |
| 2016 GR_{390} | 2 April 2016 | COIAS,Subaru Telescope (T09) | 102 | cubewano (cold)? | 44.8 | 0.10 | 2 | 40.4 | 49.2 | albedo: 0.152 | MPC; JPL |
| 2016 GR_{391} | 2 April 2016 | COIAS,Subaru Telescope (T09) | 68 | SDO | 119.3 | 0.70 | 11 | 36.4 | 202.2 | albedo: 0.124 | MPC; JPL |
| 2016 GR_{397} | 2 April 2016 | COIAS,Subaru Telescope (T09) | 104 | cubewano (cold)? | 45.9 | 0.10 | 2 | 41.5 | 50.4 | albedo: 0.152 | MPC; JPL |
| 2016 GR_{402} | 2 April 2016 | COIAS,Subaru Telescope (T09) | — | — | 43.6 | 0.04 | 1 | 42.1 | 45.1 | — | MPC; JPL |
| 2016 GS_{390} | 2 April 2016 | COIAS,Subaru Telescope (T09) | 76 | cubewano (cold)? | 41.9 | 0.19 | 1 | 33.8 | 50.0 | albedo: 0.152 | MPC; JPL |
| 2016 GS_{391} | 2 April 2016 | COIAS,Subaru Telescope (T09) | 82 | cubewano (cold)? | 43.0 | 0.03 | 2 | 41.6 | 44.5 | albedo: 0.152 | MPC; JPL |
| 2016 GS_{392} | 2 April 2016 | COIAS,Subaru Telescope (T09) | 89 | other TNO | 56.8 | 0.10 | 19 | 51.3 | 62.4 | albedo: 0.13 | MPC; JPL |
| 2016 GT_{390} | 2 April 2016 | COIAS,Subaru Telescope (T09) | 94 | cubewano (hot)? | 40.3 | 0.11 | 15 | 36.0 | 44.5 | albedo: 0.079 | MPC; JPL |
| 2016 GT_{392} | 2 April 2016 | COIAS,Subaru Telescope (T09) | 54 | other TNO | 51.5 | 0.10 | 2 | 46.6 | 56.5 | albedo: 0.13 | MPC; JPL |
| 2016 GU_{368} | 2 April 2016 | COIAS,Subaru Telescope (T09) | 67 | centaur | 115.3 | 0.81 | 1 | 21.6 | 209.1 | albedo: 0.058 | MPC; JPL |
| 2016 GU_{370} | 2 April 2016 | COIAS,Subaru Telescope (T09) | 77 | other TNO | 46.7 | 0.25 | 9 | 34.9 | 58.5 | albedo: 0.13 | MPC; JPL |
| 2016 GU_{390} | 4 April 2016 | COIAS,Subaru Telescope (T09) | 58 | cubewano (cold)? | 42.1 | 0.11 | 2 | 37.7 | 46.6 | albedo: 0.152 | MPC; JPL |
| 2016 GU_{392} | 2 April 2016 | COIAS,Subaru Telescope (T09) | 76 | cubewano (cold)? | 48.9 | 0.11 | 1 | 43.6 | 54.2 | albedo: 0.152 | MPC; JPL |
| 2016 GV_{368} | 2 April 2016 | COIAS,Subaru Telescope (T09) | 92 | cubewano (cold)? | 44.1 | 0.13 | 1 | 38.3 | 49.9 | albedo: 0.152 | MPC; JPL |
| 2016 GV_{390} | 2 April 2016 | COIAS,Subaru Telescope (T09) | 55 | cubewano (cold)? | 44.0 | 0.07 | 1 | 41.0 | 47.0 | albedo: 0.152 | MPC; JPL |
| 2016 GV_{392} | 2 April 2016 | COIAS,Subaru Telescope (T09) | 48 | cubewano (hot)? | 44.0 | 0.10 | 33 | 39.7 | 48.3 | albedo: 0.079 | MPC; JPL |
| 2016 GV_{402} | 2 April 2016 | COIAS,Subaru Telescope (T09) | — | — | 41.5 | 0.11 | 18 | 37.1 | 45.8 | — | MPC; JPL |
| 2016 GW_{367} | 11 April 2016 | COIAS,Subaru Telescope (T09) | 51 | SDO | 138.5 | 0.75 | 16 | 34.7 | 242.3 | albedo: 0.124 | MPC; JPL |
| 2016 GW_{390} | 2 April 2016 | COIAS,Subaru Telescope (T09) | 67 | cubewano (cold)? | 43.6 | 0.10 | 3 | 39.4 | 47.9 | albedo: 0.152 | MPC; JPL |
| 2016 GW_{399} | 11 April 2016 | COIAS,Subaru Telescope (T09) | 48 | other TNO | 38.7 | 0.10 | 36 | 34.8 | 42.6 | albedo: 0.13 | MPC; JPL |
| 2016 GW_{402} | 2 April 2016 | COIAS,Subaru Telescope (T09) | — | — | 47.9 | 0.10 | 3 | 43.3 | 52.5 | — | MPC; JPL |
| 2016 GX_{367} | 11 April 2016 | COIAS,Subaru Telescope (T09) | 110 | SDO | 53.3 | 0.42 | 13 | 30.8 | 75.9 | albedo: 0.124 | MPC; JPL |
| 2016 GX_{369} | 8 April 2016 | COIAS,Subaru Telescope (T09) | 120 | centaur | 75.0 | 0.68 | 12 | 24.1 | 125.8 | albedo: 0.058 | MPC; JPL |
| 2016 GX_{390} | 2 April 2016 | COIAS,Subaru Telescope (T09) | 67 | SDO | 81.4 | 0.48 | 1 | 42.3 | 120.6 | albedo: 0.124 | MPC; JPL |
| 2016 GY_{367} | 2 April 2016 | COIAS,Subaru Telescope (T09) | 58 | cubewano (hot)? | 43.5 | 0.13 | 17 | 37.7 | 49.3 | albedo: 0.079 | MPC; JPL |
| 2016 GY_{368} | 2 April 2016 | COIAS,Subaru Telescope (T09) | 72 | centaur | 88.4 | 0.74 | 2 | 23.4 | 153.3 | albedo: 0.058 | MPC; JPL |
| 2016 GY_{369} | 11 April 2016 | COIAS,Subaru Telescope (T09) | 123 | cubewano (hot)? | 41.9 | 0.17 | 28 | 34.7 | 49.1 | albedo: 0.079 | MPC; JPL |
| 2016 GZ_{276} | 10 April 2016 | Maunakea (568) | 150 | SDO | 143.2 | 0.73 | 22 | 38.7 | 247.6 | albedo: 0.124 | MPC; JPL |
| 2016 GZ_{368} | 4 April 2016 | COIAS,Subaru Telescope (T09) | 47 | other TNO | 46.4 | 0.38 | 5 | 28.8 | 63.9 | albedo: 0.13 | MPC; JPL |
| 2016 GZ_{369} | 11 April 2016 | COIAS,Subaru Telescope (T09) | 45 | other TNO | 50.8 | 0.32 | 14 | 34.4 | 67.2 | albedo: 0.13 | MPC; JPL |
| 2016 GZ_{390} | 2 April 2016 | COIAS,Subaru Telescope (T09) | 96 | cubewano (hot)? | 47.1 | 0.10 | 88 | 42.4 | 51.8 | albedo: 0.079 | MPC; JPL |
| 2016 GZ_{398} | 4 April 2016 | COIAS,Subaru Telescope (T09) | 84 | centaur | 61.0 | 0.56 | 28 | 27.1 | 95.0 | albedo: 0.058 | MPC; JPL |
| 2016 LA_{106} | 5 June 2016 | COIAS,Subaru Telescope (T09) | 65 | cubewano (hot)? | 46.5 | 0.24 | 26 | 35.4 | 57.6 | albedo: 0.079 | MPC; JPL |
| 2016 LA_{89} | 9 June 2016 | Maunakea (568) | 51 | other TNO | 38.3 | 0.04 | 21 | 36.8 | 39.8 | albedo: 0.13 | MPC; JPL |
| 2016 LA_{90} | 9 June 2016 | Maunakea (568) | 103 | cubewano (hot)? | 43.2 | 0.01 | 14 | 42.9 | 43.6 | albedo: 0.079 | MPC; JPL |
| 2016 LB_{106} | 5 June 2016 | COIAS,Subaru Telescope (T09) | 96 | cubewano (hot)? | 42.6 | 0.07 | 35 | 39.6 | 45.7 | albedo: 0.079 | MPC; JPL |
| 2016 LB_{89} | 9 June 2016 | Maunakea (568) | 62 | cubewano (cold)? | 45.7 | 0.11 | 3 | 40.8 | 50.6 | albedo: 0.152 | MPC; JPL |
| 2016 LB_{90} | 9 June 2016 | Maunakea (568) | 77 | other TNO | 50.1 | 0.01 | 24 | 49.6 | 50.7 | albedo: 0.13 | MPC; JPL |
| 2016 LC_{106} | 5 June 2016 | COIAS,Subaru Telescope (T09) | 109 | cubewano (hot)? | 43.2 | 0.14 | 17 | 37.0 | 49.3 | albedo: 0.079 | MPC; JPL |
| 2016 LC_{89} | 9 June 2016 | Maunakea (568) | 71 | cubewano (cold)? | 44.2 | 0.03 | 1 | 42.7 | 45.6 | albedo: 0.152 | MPC; JPL |
| 2016 LC_{90} | 9 June 2016 | Maunakea (568) | 78 | cubewano (cold)? | 43.6 | 0.02 | 0 | 42.9 | 44.3 | albedo: 0.152 | MPC; JPL |
| 2016 LD_{106} | 5 June 2016 | COIAS,Subaru Telescope (T09) | 81 | cubewano (hot)? | 42.2 | 0.04 | 11 | 40.5 | 44.0 | albedo: 0.079 | MPC; JPL |
| 2016 LD_{89} | 9 June 2016 | Maunakea (568) | 119 | cubewano (hot)? | 47.5 | 0.05 | 28 | 45.2 | 49.8 | albedo: 0.079 | MPC; JPL |
| 2016 LD_{90} | 9 June 2016 | Maunakea (568) | 93 | plutino? | 39.5 | 0.04 | 15 | 37.8 | 41.3 | albedo: 0.074 | MPC; JPL |
| 2016 LE_{106} | 5 June 2016 | COIAS,Subaru Telescope (T09) | 102 | plutino | 39.5 | 0.20 | 11 | 31.5 | 47.6 | albedo: 0.074 | MPC; JPL |
| 2016 LE_{89} | 9 June 2016 | Maunakea (568) | 59 | cubewano (cold)? | 42.3 | 0.04 | 1 | 40.5 | 44.1 | albedo: 0.152 | MPC; JPL |
| 2016 LE_{90} | 9 June 2016 | Maunakea (568) | 113 | cubewano (hot)? | 48.1 | 0.06 | 24 | 45.3 | 50.8 | albedo: 0.079 | MPC; JPL |
| 2016 LF_{106} | 5 June 2016 | COIAS,Subaru Telescope (T09) | 57 | twotino | 47.7 | 0.33 | 24 | 32.1 | 63.3 | albedo: 0.126 | MPC; JPL |
| 2016 LF_{90} | 9 June 2016 | Maunakea (568) | 5 | centaur | 39.4 | 0.78 | 80 | 8.8 | 70.1 | albedo: 0.058 | MPC; JPL |
| 2016 LG_{106} | 5 June 2016 | COIAS,Subaru Telescope (T09) | 133 | plutino | 39.3 | 0.11 | 22 | 34.9 | 43.8 | albedo: 0.074 | MPC; JPL |
| 2016 LG_{89} | 9 June 2016 | Maunakea (568) | 150 | cubewano (hot)? | 45.4 | 0.03 | 31 | 44.2 | 46.7 | albedo: 0.079 | MPC; JPL |
| 2016 LG_{90} | 9 June 2016 | Maunakea (568) | 51 | other TNO | 37.3 | 0.03 | 25 | 36.1 | 38.5 | albedo: 0.13 | MPC; JPL |
| 2016 LH_{89} | 9 June 2016 | Maunakea (568) | 64 | other TNO | 38.8 | 0.03 | 24 | 37.6 | 39.9 | albedo: 0.13 | MPC; JPL |
| 2016 LH_{90} | 9 June 2016 | Maunakea (568) | 74 | plutino? | 39.2 | 0.05 | 31 | 37.3 | 41.0 | albedo: 0.074 | MPC; JPL |
| 2016 LJ_{106} | 5 June 2016 | COIAS,Subaru Telescope (T09) | 162 | cubewano (hot)? | 44.2 | 0.10 | 10 | 39.9 | 48.4 | albedo: 0.079 | MPC; JPL |
| 2016 LJ_{89} | 9 June 2016 | Maunakea (568) | 34 | other TNO | 33.5 | 0.04 | 11 | 32.2 | 34.8 | albedo: 0.13 | MPC; JPL |
| 2016 LJ_{90} | 9 June 2016 | Maunakea (568) | 72 | cubewano (hot)? | 41.5 | 0.02 | 25 | 40.6 | 42.5 | albedo: 0.079 | MPC; JPL |
| 2016 LK_{106} | 5 June 2016 | COIAS,Subaru Telescope (T09) | 56 | other TNO | 44.7 | 0.19 | 33 | 36.0 | 53.3 | albedo: 0.13 | MPC; JPL |
| 2016 LK_{111} | — | — | — | — | 51.3 | 0.27 | 21 | 37.5 | 65.1 | — | MPC; JPL |
| 2016 LK_{89} | 9 June 2016 | Maunakea (568) | 222 | other TNO | 60.1 | 0.00 | 25 | 60.1 | 60.1 | albedo: 0.13 | MPC; JPL |
| 2016 LL_{89} | 9 June 2016 | Maunakea (568) | 71 | cubewano (cold)? | 43.4 | 0.03 | 2 | 42.3 | 44.6 | albedo: 0.152 | MPC; JPL |
| 2016 LL_{90} | 9 June 2016 | Maunakea (568) | 103 | cubewano (hot)? | 43.0 | 0.02 | 33 | 42.0 | 44.0 | albedo: 0.079 | MPC; JPL |
| 2016 LM_{89} | 9 June 2016 | Maunakea (568) | 78 | cubewano (hot)? | 44.4 | 0.02 | 36 | 43.4 | 45.3 | albedo: 0.079 | MPC; JPL |
| 2016 LM_{90} | 9 June 2016 | Maunakea (568) | 42 | other TNO | 34.8 | 0.03 | 21 | 33.9 | 35.7 | albedo: 0.13 | MPC; JPL |
| 2016 LN_{89} | 9 June 2016 | Maunakea (568) | 40 | other TNO | 36.2 | 0.03 | 9 | 35.3 | 37.2 | albedo: 0.13 | MPC; JPL |
| 2016 LN_{90} | 9 June 2016 | Maunakea (568) | 86 | cubewano (hot)? | 41.7 | 0.03 | 20 | 40.4 | 43.0 | albedo: 0.079 | MPC; JPL |
| 2016 LO_{90} | 9 June 2016 | Maunakea (568) | 136 | cubewano (hot)? | 45.8 | 0.02 | 62 | 45.0 | 46.5 | albedo: 0.079 | MPC; JPL |
| 2016 LP_{88} | 9 June 2016 | Maunakea (568) | 199 | cubewano (hot)? | 46.5 | 0.12 | 25 | 40.9 | 52.0 | albedo: 0.079 | MPC; JPL |
| 2016 LP_{89} | 9 June 2016 | Maunakea (568) | 44 | other TNO | 37.1 | 0.03 | 12 | 36.1 | 38.0 | albedo: 0.13 | MPC; JPL |
| 2016 LP_{90} | 9 June 2016 | Maunakea (568) | 46 | other TNO | 33.4 | 0.02 | 8 | 32.8 | 33.9 | albedo: 0.13 | MPC; JPL |
| 2016 LQ_{88} | 9 June 2016 | Maunakea (568) | 96 | other TNO | 38.2 | 0.08 | 24 | 35.1 | 41.2 | albedo: 0.13 | MPC; JPL |
| 2016 LQ_{89} | 9 June 2016 | Maunakea (568) | 71 | cubewano (cold)? | 44.6 | 0.02 | 3 | 43.6 | 45.6 | albedo: 0.152 | MPC; JPL |
| 2016 LQ_{90} | 9 June 2016 | Maunakea (568) | 40 | other TNO | 39.1 | 0.06 | 20 | 36.8 | 41.3 | albedo: 0.13 | MPC; JPL |
| 2016 LR_{89} | 9 June 2016 | Maunakea (568) | 42 | other TNO | 34.9 | 0.03 | 8 | 33.9 | 35.9 | albedo: 0.13 | MPC; JPL |
| 2016 LR_{90} | 9 June 2016 | Maunakea (568) | 82 | cubewano (hot)? | 48.0 | 0.06 | 72 | 45.3 | 50.6 | albedo: 0.079 | MPC; JPL |
| 2016 LS_{88} | 9 June 2016 | Maunakea (568) | 93 | other TNO | 52.5 | 0.04 | 34 | 50.4 | 54.6 | albedo: 0.13 | MPC; JPL |
| 2016 LS_{89} | 9 June 2016 | Maunakea (568) | 44 | other TNO | 35.4 | 0.02 | 10 | 34.6 | 36.2 | albedo: 0.13 | MPC; JPL |
| 2016 LS_{90} | 9 June 2016 | Maunakea (568) | 121 | twotino | 47.6 | 0.17 | 22 | 39.4 | 55.8 | albedo: 0.126 | MPC; JPL |
| 2016 LT_{88} | 9 June 2016 | Maunakea (568) | 90 | cubewano (hot)? | 49.1 | 0.01 | 33 | 48.8 | 49.5 | albedo: 0.079 | MPC; JPL |
| 2016 LT_{89} | 9 June 2016 | Maunakea (568) | 143 | cubewano (hot)? | 41.8 | 0.02 | 39 | 41.2 | 42.5 | albedo: 0.079 | MPC; JPL |
| 2016 LT_{90} | 9 June 2016 | Maunakea (568) | 64 | plutino? | 39.2 | 0.05 | 32 | 37.3 | 41.1 | albedo: 0.074 | MPC; JPL |
| 2016 LU_{88} | 9 June 2016 | Maunakea (568) | 75 | cubewano (hot)? | 47.3 | 0.07 | 31 | 44.1 | 50.5 | albedo: 0.079 | MPC; JPL |
| 2016 LU_{89} | 9 June 2016 | Maunakea (568) | 40 | other TNO | 36.0 | 0.04 | 8 | 34.8 | 37.3 | albedo: 0.13 | MPC; JPL |
| 2016 LU_{90} | 9 June 2016 | Maunakea (568) | 51 | other TNO | 35.6 | 0.02 | 20 | 34.8 | 36.5 | albedo: 0.13 | MPC; JPL |
| 2016 LV_{88} | 9 June 2016 | Maunakea (568) | 99 | cubewano (hot)? | 44.8 | 0.05 | 29 | 42.8 | 46.9 | albedo: 0.079 | MPC; JPL |
| 2016 LV_{89} | 9 June 2016 | Maunakea (568) | 74 | other TNO | 38.3 | 0.03 | 26 | 37.1 | 39.4 | albedo: 0.13 | MPC; JPL |
| 2016 LV_{90} | 9 June 2016 | Maunakea (568) | 67 | other TNO | 33.2 | 0.04 | 26 | 32.0 | 34.5 | albedo: 0.13 | MPC; JPL |
| 2016 LW_{88} | 9 June 2016 | Maunakea (568) | 51 | other TNO | 36.8 | 0.02 | 39 | 36.1 | 37.6 | albedo: 0.13 | MPC; JPL |
| 2016 LW_{89} | 9 June 2016 | Maunakea (568) | 71 | cubewano (cold)? | 47.0 | 0.02 | 2 | 46.1 | 47.9 | albedo: 0.152 | MPC; JPL |
| 2016 LW_{90} | 9 June 2016 | Maunakea (568) | 59 | cubewano (cold)? | 41.0 | 0.00 | 4 | 40.8 | 41.2 | albedo: 0.152 | MPC; JPL |
| 2016 LX_{88} | 9 June 2016 | Maunakea (568) | 86 | cubewano (cold)? | 45.3 | 0.04 | 3 | 43.8 | 46.9 | albedo: 0.152 | MPC; JPL |
| 2016 LX_{89} | 9 June 2016 | Maunakea (568) | 321 | cubewano (hot) | 43.0 | 0.14 | 14 | 36.9 | 49.2 | albedo: 0.079 | MPC; JPL |
| 2016 LY_{88} | 9 June 2016 | Maunakea (568) | 81 | other TNO | 51.0 | 0.04 | 35 | 49.1 | 52.9 | albedo: 0.13 | MPC; JPL |
| 2016 LY_{89} | 9 June 2016 | Maunakea (568) | 57 | cubewano (hot)? | 40.1 | 0.03 | 15 | 39.1 | 41.2 | albedo: 0.079 | MPC; JPL |
| 2016 LZ_{88} | 9 June 2016 | Maunakea (568) | 90 | cubewano (hot)? | 43.8 | 0.04 | 25 | 42.1 | 45.4 | albedo: 0.079 | MPC; JPL |
| 2016 LZ_{89} | 9 June 2016 | Maunakea (568) | 107 | plutino? | 39.3 | 0.04 | 52 | 37.8 | 40.9 | albedo: 0.074 | MPC; JPL |
| 2016 NA_{209} | 5 July 2016 | COIAS,Subaru Telescope (T09) | 68 | other TNO | 48.8 | 0.29 | 22 | 34.8 | 62.7 | albedo: 0.13 | MPC; JPL |
| 2016 NB_{208} | 12 July 2016 | COIAS,Subaru Telescope (T09) | 92 | other TNO | 45.6 | 0.15 | 16 | 38.6 | 52.5 | albedo: 0.13 | MPC; JPL |
| 2016 NH_{216} | — | — | — | — | 41.2 | 0.10 | 13.9 | 37.2 | 45.3 | — | MPC; JPL |
| 2016 NN_{208} | 7 July 2016 | COIAS,Subaru Telescope (T09) | 51 | centaur | 45.1 | 0.34 | 17 | 29.7 | 60.5 | albedo: 0.058 | MPC; JPL |
| 2016 NY_{210} | 4 July 2016 | Cerro Tololo-DECam (W84) | 620 | cubewano (hot)? | 41.7 | 0.09 | 23 | 37.8 | 45.5 | albedo: 0.079 | MPC; JPL |
| 2016 OT_{17} | 29 July 2016 | COIAS,Subaru Telescope (T09) | 42 | SDO | 93.2 | 0.63 | 6 | 34.5 | 151.9 | albedo: 0.124 | MPC; JPL |
| 2016 PA_{101} | 14 August 2016 | DECam (W84) | 84 | other TNO | 40.6 | 0.10 | 20 | 36.6 | 44.5 | albedo: 0.13 | MPC; JPL |
| 2016 PK_{220} | 15 August 2016 | DECam (W84) | 110 | other TNO | 50.0 | 0.24 | 42 | 37.9 | 62.2 | albedo: 0.13 | MPC; JPL |
| 2016 PL_{220} | 14 August 2016 | DECam (W84) | 66 | SDO | 77.1 | 0.59 | 29 | 31.3 | 122.9 | albedo: 0.124 | MPC; JPL |
| 2016 PM_{220} | 14 August 2016 | DECam (W84) | 124 | cubewano (hot)? | 40.2 | 0.16 | 23 | 33.6 | 46.8 | albedo: 0.079 | MPC; JPL |
| 2016 PN_{219} | 15 August 2016 | DECam (W84) | 189 | res · 3:5 | 42.2 | 0.15 | 12 | 36.1 | 48.4 | albedo: 0.126 | MPC; JPL |
| 2016 PN_{220} | 14 August 2016 | DECam (W84) | 175 | cubewano (hot)? | 45.5 | 0.19 | 7 | 37.0 | 54.1 | albedo: 0.079 | MPC; JPL |
| 2016 PN_{66} | 14 August 2016 | Crni Vrh (106) | 13 | damocloid | 31.5 | 0.91 | 105 | 2.9 | 60.0 | albedo: 0.048 | MPC; JPL |
| 2016 PO_{220} | 15 August 2016 | DECam (W84) | 175 | cubewano (hot) | 42.1 | 0.03 | 29 | 40.7 | 43.4 | albedo: 0.079 | MPC; JPL |
| 2016 PO_{296} | 9 August 2016 | COIAS,Subaru Telescope (T09) | 251 | SDO | 58.0 | 0.30 | 14 | 40.4 | 75.6 | binary: 169 km; albedo: 0.124 | MPC; JPL |
| 2016 PP_{220} | 15 August 2016 | DECam (W84) | 199 | cubewano (hot) | 44.7 | 0.12 | 6 | 39.2 | 50.1 | albedo: 0.079 | MPC; JPL |
| 2016 PP_{296} | 1 August 2016 | COIAS,Subaru Telescope (T09) | 58 | cubewano (cold)? | 46.4 | 0.12 | 4 | 40.7 | 52.0 | albedo: 0.152 | MPC; JPL |
| 2016 PQ_{296} | 1 August 2016 | COIAS,Subaru Telescope (T09) | 139 | centaur | 126.2 | 0.81 | 4 | 24.1 | 228.2 | albedo: 0.058 | MPC; JPL |
| 2016 PT_{220} | 14 August 2016 | DECam (W84) | 171 | cubewano (hot) | 42.4 | 0.08 | 6 | 38.9 | 45.9 | albedo: 0.079 | MPC; JPL |
| 2016 PU_{219} | 14 August 2016 | DECam (W84) | 81 | other TNO | 38.4 | 0.05 | 35 | 36.4 | 40.5 | albedo: 0.13 | MPC; JPL |
| 2016 PU_{298} | 1 August 2016 | COIAS,Subaru Telescope (T09) | 87 | centaur | 47.5 | 0.42 | 4 | 27.4 | 67.6 | albedo: 0.058 | MPC; JPL |
| 2016 PV_{298} | 9 August 2016 | COIAS,Subaru Telescope (T09) | 89 | other TNO | 45.6 | 0.19 | 13 | 36.9 | 54.4 | albedo: 0.13 | MPC; JPL |
| 2016 PY_{295} | 4 August 2016 | COIAS,Subaru Telescope (T09) | 118 | other TNO | 48.1 | 0.29 | 13 | 34.4 | 61.9 | albedo: 0.13 | MPC; JPL |
| 2016 QA_{135} | 26 August 2016 | DECam (W84) | 193 | cubewano (hot)? | 46.6 | 0.21 | 28 | 37.0 | 56.1 | albedo: 0.079 | MPC; JPL |
| 2016 QB_{135} | 26 August 2016 | DECam (W84) | 119 | centaur | 33.2 | 0.11 | 15 | 29.6 | 36.8 | albedo: 0.058 | MPC; JPL |
| 2016 QC_{135} | 26 August 2016 | DECam (W84) | 186 | cubewano (hot) | 44.3 | 0.12 | 9 | 39.0 | 49.7 | albedo: 0.079 | MPC; JPL |
| 2016 QD_{135} | 31 August 2016 | DECam (W84) | 172 | cubewano (hot)? | 47.4 | 0.14 | 28 | 40.8 | 54.1 | albedo: 0.079 | MPC; JPL |
| 2016 QE_{135} | 16 August 2016 | DECam (W84) | 141 | cubewano (hot) | 42.6 | 0.11 | 27 | 37.7 | 47.4 | albedo: 0.079 | MPC; JPL |
| 2016 QF_{135} | 16 August 2016 | DECam (W84) | 155 | SDO | 48.8 | 0.25 | 28 | 36.6 | 61.0 | albedo: 0.124 | MPC; JPL |
| 2016 QF_{165} | 28 August 2016 | COIAS,Subaru Telescope (T09) | 203 | other TNO | 50.7 | 0.15 | 14 | 42.9 | 58.5 | albedo: 0.13 | MPC; JPL |
| 2016 QG_{135} | 25 August 2016 | DECam (W84) | 252 | cubewano (hot)? | 47.5 | 0.17 | 24 | 39.5 | 55.4 | albedo: 0.079 | MPC; JPL |
| 2016 QL_{134} | 25 August 2016 | DECam (W84) | 147 | cubewano (hot) | 43.9 | 0.05 | 9 | 41.8 | 46.0 | albedo: 0.079 | MPC; JPL |
| 2016 QM_{134} | 26 August 2016 | DECam (W84) | 132 | cubewano (cold) | 44.2 | 0.03 | 5 | 43.0 | 45.4 | albedo: 0.152 | MPC; JPL |
| 2016 QN_{134} | 30 August 2016 | DECam (W84) | 94 | res · 4:7 | 43.9 | 0.16 | 6 | 36.9 | 50.8 | albedo: 0.126 | MPC; JPL |
| 2016 QN_{158} | 28 August 2016 | COIAS,Subaru Telescope (T09) | 52 | other TNO | 40.8 | 0.12 | 22 | 36.0 | 45.6 | albedo: 0.13 | MPC; JPL |
| 2016 QO_{134} | 16 August 2016 | DECam (W84) | 66 | res · 4:7 | 43.8 | 0.29 | 17 | 30.9 | 56.7 | albedo: 0.126 | MPC; JPL |
| 2016 QP_{134} | 26 August 2016 | DECam (W84) | 194 | SDO | 94.1 | 0.64 | 24 | 34.3 | 153.9 | albedo: 0.124 | MPC; JPL |
| 2016 QP_{85} | 25 August 2016 | DECam (W84) | 120 | SDO | 60.3 | 0.34 | 16 | 39.8 | 80.7 | albedo: 0.124 | MPC; JPL |
| 2016 QQ_{164} | 28 August 2016 | COIAS,Subaru Telescope (T09) | 99 | other TNO | 48.7 | 0.25 | 17 | 36.6 | 60.9 | albedo: 0.13 | MPC; JPL |
| 2016 QR_{164} | 30 August 2016 | COIAS,Subaru Telescope (T09) | 45 | SDO | 51.7 | 0.30 | 19 | 36.2 | 67.2 | albedo: 0.124 | MPC; JPL |
| 2016 QV_{134} | 26 August 2016 | DECam (W84) | 66 | res · 3:5 | 42.5 | 0.19 | 8 | 34.5 | 50.5 | albedo: 0.126 | MPC; JPL |
| 2016 QW_{134} | 16 August 2016 | DECam (W84) | 137 | cubewano (hot) | 42.0 | 0.07 | 23 | 39.2 | 44.9 | albedo: 0.079 | MPC; JPL |
| 2016 QX_{134} | 23 August 2016 | DECam (W84) | 207 | cubewano (hot) | 43.8 | 0.10 | 11 | 39.4 | 48.1 | albedo: 0.079 | MPC; JPL |
| 2016 QY_{134} | 24 August 2016 | DECam (W84) | 164 | cubewano (hot)? | 44.3 | 0.16 | 10 | 37.2 | 51.3 | albedo: 0.079 | MPC; JPL |
| 2016 QZ_{133} | 31 August 2016 | DECam (W84) | 196 | twotino | 47.8 | 0.10 | 12 | 43.0 | 52.7 | albedo: 0.126 | MPC; JPL |
| 2016 QZ_{134} | 26 August 2016 | DECam (W84) | 147 | cubewano (hot) | 42.9 | 0.13 | 21 | 37.4 | 48.4 | albedo: 0.079 | MPC; JPL |
| 2016 QZ_{158} | 28 August 2016 | COIAS,Subaru Telescope (T09) | 110 | SDO | 59.5 | 0.29 | 24 | 42.5 | 76.5 | albedo: 0.124 | MPC; JPL |
| 2016 RA_{82} | 10 September 2016 | DECam (W84) | 154 | cubewano (hot) | 43.3 | 0.08 | 12 | 39.8 | 46.8 | albedo: 0.079 | MPC; JPL |
| 2016 RC_{112} | — | — | — | — | 46.5 | 0.09 | 4 | 42.3 | 50.7 | — | MPC; JPL |
| 2016 RD_{82} | 8 September 2016 | DECam (W84) | 128 | cubewano (hot)? | 45.6 | 0.15 | 25 | 39.0 | 52.3 | albedo: 0.079 | MPC; JPL |
| 2016 RF_{82} | 8 September 2016 | DECam (W84) | 98 | SDO | 65.1 | 0.45 | 39 | 36.1 | 94.2 | albedo: 0.124 | MPC; JPL |
| 2016 RG_{112} | — | — | — | — | 41.0 | 0.07 | 25.6 | 38.2 | 43.8 | — | MPC; JPL |
| 2016 RG_{82} | 9 September 2016 | DECam (W84) | 116 | cubewano (cold) | 42.8 | 0.03 | 4 | 41.6 | 43.9 | albedo: 0.152 | MPC; JPL |
| 2016 RH_{112} | — | — | — | — | 41.7 | 0.23 | 8.5 | 32.2 | 51.2 | — | MPC; JPL |
| 2016 RH_{82} | 10 September 2016 | DECam (W84) | 113 | cubewano (cold) | 44.1 | 0.05 | 2 | 41.9 | 46.3 | albedo: 0.152 | MPC; JPL |
| 2016 RJ_{82} | 1 September 2016 | DECam (W84) | 101 | other TNO | 38.5 | 0.10 | 56 | 34.7 | 42.3 | albedo: 0.13 | MPC; JPL |
| 2016 RK_{107} | 5 September 2016 | COIAS,Subaru Telescope (T09) | 75 | cubewano (hot)? | 47.2 | 0.11 | 9 | 42.2 | 52.2 | albedo: 0.079 | MPC; JPL |
| 2016 RK_{82} | 7 September 2016 | DECam (W84) | 127 | cubewano (hot) | 42.9 | 0.15 | 21 | 36.7 | 49.2 | albedo: 0.079 | MPC; JPL |
| 2016 RL_{82} | 10 September 2016 | DECam (W84) | 91 | res · 3:7 | 53.4 | 0.31 | 23 | 36.7 | 70.1 | albedo: 0.126 | MPC; JPL |
| 2016 RM_{82} | 5 September 2016 | DECam (W84) | 185 | cubewano (hot) | 45.3 | 0.11 | 30 | 40.3 | 50.4 | albedo: 0.079 | MPC; JPL |
| 2016 RN_{100} | 7 September 2016 | COIAS,Subaru Telescope (T09) | 87 | plutino | 39.5 | 0.18 | 6 | 32.3 | 46.6 | albedo: 0.074 | MPC; JPL |
| 2016 RN_{82} | 6 September 2016 | DECam (W84) | 97 | SDO | 108.4 | 0.70 | 25 | 32.8 | 184.0 | albedo: 0.124 | MPC; JPL |
| 2016 RO_{100} | 7 September 2016 | COIAS,Subaru Telescope (T09) | 50 | other TNO | 50.7 | 0.27 | 7 | 36.9 | 64.5 | albedo: 0.13 | MPC; JPL |
| 2016 RO_{82} | 8 September 2016 | DECam (W84) | 233 | cubewano (hot) | 45.9 | 0.14 | 35 | 39.5 | 52.2 | albedo: 0.079 | MPC; JPL |
| 2016 RP_{105} | 7 September 2016 | COIAS,Subaru Telescope (T09) | 73 | cubewano (hot)? | 46.4 | 0.11 | 8 | 41.3 | 51.5 | albedo: 0.079 | MPC; JPL |
| 2016 RP_{82} | 9 September 2016 | DECam (W84) | 150 | cubewano (hot)? | 44.5 | 0.20 | 20 | 35.8 | 53.2 | albedo: 0.079 | MPC; JPL |
| 2016 RQ_{105} | 7 September 2016 | COIAS,Subaru Telescope (T09) | 84 | other TNO | 46.1 | 0.20 | 21 | 37.1 | 55.2 | albedo: 0.13 | MPC; JPL |
| 2016 RQ_{82} | 9 September 2016 | DECam (W84) | 131 | cubewano (cold) | 45.0 | 0.06 | 4 | 42.2 | 47.9 | albedo: 0.152 | MPC; JPL |
| 2016 RR_{105} | 5 September 2016 | COIAS,Subaru Telescope (T09) | 63 | cubewano (hot)? | 41.7 | 0.11 | 17 | 37.2 | 46.2 | albedo: 0.079 | MPC; JPL |
| 2016 RR_{82} | 11 September 2016 | DECam (W84) | 126 | cubewano (cold) | 43.9 | 0.04 | 2 | 42.0 | 45.8 | albedo: 0.152 | MPC; JPL |
| 2016 RS_{105} | 5 September 2016 | COIAS,Subaru Telescope (T09) | 54 | SDO | 68.2 | 0.47 | 6 | 36.0 | 100.4 | albedo: 0.124 | MPC; JPL |
| 2016 RS_{82} | 11 September 2016 | DECam (W84) | 147 | cubewano (cold) | 43.1 | 0.04 | 3 | 41.3 | 44.8 | albedo: 0.152 | MPC; JPL |
| 2016 RT_{82} | 11 September 2016 | DECam (W84) | 139 | other TNO | 46.8 | 0.24 | 21 | 35.7 | 57.9 | albedo: 0.13 | MPC; JPL |
| 2016 RU_{81} | 10 September 2016 | DECam (W84) | 102 | cubewano (cold) | 43.3 | 0.06 | 4 | 40.7 | 46.0 | albedo: 0.152 | MPC; JPL |
| 2016 RV_{81} | 5 September 2016 | DECam (W84) | 157 | cubewano (hot)? | 45.5 | 0.16 | 22 | 38.3 | 52.7 | albedo: 0.079 | MPC; JPL |
| 2016 RW_{82} | 7 September 2016 | DECam (W84) | 174 | SDO | 52.4 | 0.27 | 28 | 38.1 | 66.7 | albedo: 0.124 | MPC; JPL |
| 2016 RX_{81} | 9 September 2016 | DECam (W84) | 112 | cubewano (cold) | 44.1 | 0.03 | 5 | 43.0 | 45.2 | albedo: 0.152 | MPC; JPL |
| 2016 RX_{82} | 8 September 2016 | DECam (W84) | 145 | cubewano (hot)? | 47.1 | 0.20 | 13 | 37.7 | 56.6 | albedo: 0.079 | MPC; JPL |
| 2016 SA_{56} | 27 September 2016 | Maunakea (568) | 136 | SDO | 50.0 | 0.28 | 17 | 36.2 | 63.8 | albedo: 0.124; taxonomy: BB | MPC; JPL |
| 2016 SA_{59} | 28 September 2016 | Maunakea (568) | 103 | ESDO | 252.5 | 0.85 | 22 | 39.2 | 465.9 | albedo: 0.124 | MPC; JPL |
| 2016 SB_{106} | 22 September 2016 | DECam (W84) | 140 | cubewano (cold) | 44.1 | 0.04 | 5 | 42.5 | 45.6 | albedo: 0.152 | MPC; JPL |
| 2016 SB_{56} | 19 August 2014 | DECam (W84) | 146 | cubewano (hot)? | 40.3 | 0.06 | 17 | 37.7 | 42.9 | albedo: 0.079 | MPC; JPL |
| 2016 SC_{59} | 28 September 2016 | Maunakea (568) | 135 | cubewano (hot) | 44.6 | 0.14 | 14 | 38.3 | 50.8 | albedo: 0.079 | MPC; JPL |
| 2016 SD_{106} | 26 September 2016 | DECam (W84) | 163 | EDDO | 357.4 | 0.88 | 5 | 42.7 | 672.1 | albedo: 0.124 | MPC; JPL |
| 2016 SD_{58} | 27 September 2016 | Maunakea (568) | 77 | plutino | 39.5 | 0.10 | 16 | 35.6 | 43.5 | albedo: 0.074 | MPC; JPL |
| 2016 SE_{58} | 19 August 2014 | DECam (W84) | 136 | cubewano (hot) | 43.6 | 0.14 | 16 | 37.6 | 49.7 | albedo: 0.079 | MPC; JPL |
| 2016 SF_{57} | 27 September 2016 | Maunakea (568) | 127 | plutino | 39.4 | 0.21 | 17 | 31.2 | 47.6 | albedo: 0.074 | MPC; JPL |
| 2016 SG_{58} | 27 September 2016 | Maunakea (568) | 124 | ESDO | 244.4 | 0.86 | 13 | 35.1 | 453.7 | albedo: 0.124; taxonomy: IR | MPC; JPL |
| 2016 SH_{57} | 27 September 2016 | Maunakea (568) | 99 | cubewano (hot)? | 46.8 | 0.21 | 17 | 37.2 | 56.3 | albedo: 0.079 | MPC; JPL |
| 2016 SJ_{105} | 23 September 2016 | DECam (W84) | 89 | other TNO | 38.0 | 0.06 | 21 | 35.7 | 40.3 | albedo: 0.13 | MPC; JPL |
| 2016 SJ_{56} | 27 September 2016 | Maunakea (568) | 76 | twotino | 53.2 | 0.40 | 16 | 32.1 | 74.2 | albedo: 0.126 | MPC; JPL |
| 2016 SJ_{57} | 27 September 2016 | Maunakea (568) | 123 | res · 3:4 | 36.5 | 0.07 | 15 | 33.9 | 39.2 | albedo: 0.126; taxonomy: BB | MPC; JPL |
| 2016 SJ_{58} | 19 August 2014 | DECam (W84) | 64 | res · 4:7 | 44.0 | 0.28 | 21 | 31.7 | 56.2 | albedo: 0.126 | MPC; JPL |
| 2016 SK_{56} | 27 September 2016 | Maunakea (568) | 173 | cubewano (hot) | 43.1 | 0.10 | 16 | 38.8 | 47.3 | albedo: 0.079 | MPC; JPL |
| 2016 SL_{56} | 27 September 2016 | Maunakea (568) | 89 | other TNO | 39.6 | 0.15 | 26 | 33.8 | 45.4 | albedo: 0.13 | MPC; JPL |
| 2016 SN_{56} | 19 August 2014 | DECam (W84) | 166 | cubewano (hot)? | 45.9 | 0.20 | 27 | 36.7 | 55.2 | albedo: 0.079 | MPC; JPL |
| 2016 SN_{57} | 27 September 2016 | Maunakea (568) | — | — | 44.0 | 0.34 | 13 | 28.9 | 59.2 | — | MPC; JPL |
| 2016 SO_{56} | 27 September 2016 | Maunakea (568) | 125 | res · 1:3 | 62.9 | 0.40 | 16 | 38.0 | 87.8 | albedo: 0.126 | MPC; JPL |
| 2016 SP_{56} | 27 September 2016 | Maunakea (568) | 195 | SDO | 50.0 | 0.26 | 20 | 36.9 | 63.1 | albedo: 0.124; taxonomy: IR | MPC; JPL |
| 2016 SQ_{55} | 27 September 2016 | Maunakea (568) | 192 | cubewano (hot) | 43.3 | 0.10 | 18 | 38.9 | 47.6 | albedo: 0.079 | MPC; JPL |
| 2016 SQ_{58} | 27 September 2016 | Maunakea (568) | 97 | res · 3:4 | 36.5 | 0.11 | 23 | 32.4 | 40.7 | albedo: 0.126; taxonomy: BR | MPC; JPL |
| 2016 SR_{105} | 22 September 2016 | DECam (W84) | 116 | centaur | 47.1 | 0.59 | 19 | 19.5 | 74.8 | albedo: 0.058 | MPC; JPL |
| 2016 SR_{58} | 27 September 2016 | Maunakea (568) | 105 | SDO | 80.5 | 0.56 | 29 | 35.5 | 125.5 | albedo: 0.124 | MPC; JPL |
| 2016 SS_{46} | 22 September 2016 | DECam (W84) | 66 | other TNO | 40.9 | 0.25 | 15 | 30.5 | 51.3 | albedo: 0.13 | MPC; JPL |
| 2016 SS_{55} | 27 September 2016 | Maunakea (568) | 179 | SDO | 73.5 | 0.48 | 29 | 38.5 | 108.6 | albedo: 0.124; taxonomy: BR | MPC; JPL |
| 2016 SU_{55} | 27 September 2016 | Maunakea (568) | 91 | other TNO | 38.1 | 0.03 | 28 | 37.0 | 39.2 | albedo: 0.13 | MPC; JPL |
| 2016 SU_{56} | 27 September 2016 | Maunakea (568) | 96 | SDO | 60.0 | 0.36 | 19 | 38.2 | 81.8 | albedo: 0.124 | MPC; JPL |
| 2016 SU_{57} | 27 September 2016 | Maunakea (568) | 171 | cubewano (hot)? | 45.8 | 0.19 | 23 | 37.2 | 54.3 | albedo: 0.079 | MPC; JPL |
| 2016 SU_{58} | 28 September 2016 | Maunakea (568) | 92 | centaur | 82.0 | 0.71 | 15 | 23.8 | 140.3 | albedo: 0.058 | MPC; JPL |
| 2016 SV_{56} | 27 September 2016 | Maunakea (568) | — | — | 70.0 | 0.77 | 19 | 16.3 | 123.7 | — | MPC; JPL |
| 2016 SV_{58} | 28 September 2016 | Maunakea (568) | 93 | other TNO | 45.3 | 0.27 | 14 | 32.9 | 57.6 | albedo: 0.13 | MPC; JPL |
| 2016 SW_{105} | 24 September 2016 | DECam (W84) | 106 | res · 3:4 | 36.3 | 0.19 | 30 | 29.3 | 43.4 | albedo: 0.126 | MPC; JPL |
| 2016 SW_{50} | 22 September 2016 | DECam (W84) | 69 | SDO | 73.4 | 0.51 | 32 | 35.9 | 110.8 | albedo: 0.124 | MPC; JPL |
| 2016 SW_{57} | 27 September 2016 | Maunakea (568) | 181 | cubewano (hot)? | 46.6 | 0.18 | 14 | 38.2 | 54.9 | albedo: 0.079 | MPC; JPL |
| 2016 SX_{105} | 23 September 2016 | DECam (W84) | 103 | SDO | 50.9 | 0.31 | 36 | 35.2 | 66.6 | albedo: 0.124 | MPC; JPL |
| 2016 SY_{105} | 23 September 2016 | DECam (W84) | 76 | other TNO | 45.4 | 0.26 | 26 | 33.9 | 57.0 | albedo: 0.13 | MPC; JPL |
| 2016 SY_{55} | 27 September 2016 | Maunakea (568) | 121 | plutino | 39.6 | 0.19 | 17 | 32.2 | 46.9 | albedo: 0.074 | MPC; JPL |
| 2016 SY_{56} | 27 September 2016 | Maunakea (568) | 152 | cubewano (hot) | 43.0 | 0.12 | 14 | 37.9 | 48.2 | albedo: 0.079 | MPC; JPL |
| 2016 SZ_{105} | 22 September 2016 | DECam (W84) | 128 | cubewano (cold) | 42.9 | 0.03 | 3 | 41.5 | 44.4 | albedo: 0.152 | MPC; JPL |
| 2016 SZ_{57} | 27 September 2016 | Maunakea (568) | 129 | plutino | 39.2 | 0.07 | 17 | 36.4 | 42.0 | albedo: 0.074 | MPC; JPL |
| 2016 TA_{95} | 30 September 2014 | Cerro Tololo-DECam (W84) | 121 | res · 2:7 | 70.0 | 0.49 | 25 | 35.9 | 104.2 | albedo: 0.126 | MPC; JPL |
| 2016 TL_{176} | 2 October 2016 | DECam (W84) | 99 | cubewano (hot)? | 47.1 | 0.22 | 21 | 36.5 | 57.7 | albedo: 0.079 | MPC; JPL |
| 2016 TM_{176} | 1 October 2016 | DECam (W84) | 118 | SDO | 53.3 | 0.39 | 17 | 32.6 | 74.0 | albedo: 0.124 | MPC; JPL |
| 2016 TN_{120} | 6 October 2016 | Cerro Tololo Observatory, La Serena (807) | 192 | other TNO | 52.9 | 0.17 | 29 | 43.9 | 62.0 | albedo: 0.13 | MPC; JPL |
| 2016 TO_{120} | 6 October 2016 | Cerro Tololo Observatory, La Serena (807) | 128 | SDO | 58.9 | 0.30 | 33 | 41.3 | 76.5 | albedo: 0.124 | MPC; JPL |
| 2016 TP_{120} | 7 October 2016 | Cerro Tololo Observatory, La Serena (807) | 150 | SDO | 170.3 | 0.76 | 33 | 40.2 | 300.4 | albedo: 0.124 | MPC; JPL |
| 2016 TQ_{120} | 6 October 2016 | Cerro Tololo Observatory, La Serena (807) | 181 | SDO | 84.2 | 0.52 | 38 | 40.8 | 127.5 | albedo: 0.124 | MPC; JPL |
| 2016 TR_{120} | 9 October 2016 | Cerro Tololo Observatory, La Serena (807) | 154 | other TNO | 56.5 | 0.24 | 33 | 43.2 | 69.8 | albedo: 0.13 | MPC; JPL |
| 2016 TS_{94} | 6 October 2016 | Cerro Tololo Observatory, La Serena (807) | 153 | plutino | 39.5 | 0.18 | 37 | 32.3 | 46.7 | albedo: 0.074; taxonomy: BR | MPC; JPL |
| 2016 TS_{97} | 6 October 2016 | Cerro Tololo Observatory, La Serena (807) | 227 | SDO | 54.3 | 0.32 | 32 | 36.9 | 71.8 | albedo: 0.124 | MPC; JPL |
| 2016 TT_{94} | 6 October 2016 | Cerro Tololo Observatory, La Serena (807) | 213 | cubewano (hot)? | 42.1 | 0.17 | 32 | 35.1 | 49.0 | possible binary; albedo: 0.079; taxonomy: BR | MPC; JPL |
| 2016 TW_{94} | 29 October 2014 | Cerro Tololo-DECam (W84) | 146 | cubewano (hot) | 42.9 | 0.07 | 29 | 40.1 | 45.7 | albedo: 0.079 | MPC; JPL |
| 2016 TY_{94} | 8 October 2016 | S. S. Sheppard (807) | 140 | other TNO | 49.1 | 0.25 | 26 | 36.9 | 61.4 | albedo: 0.13 | MPC; JPL |
| 2016 TZ_{94} | 8 October 2016 | Cerro Tololo Observatory, La Serena (807) | 165 | cubewano (hot)? | 44.4 | 0.16 | 24 | 37.3 | 51.5 | albedo: 0.079 | MPC; JPL |
| 2016 UL_{273} | 29 October 2016 | DECam (W84) | 110 | cubewano (hot) | 41.8 | 0.12 | 25 | 36.7 | 46.9 | albedo: 0.079 | MPC; JPL |
| 2016 UN_{232} | 27 October 2016 | Pan-STARRS 1 (F51) | 4 | unusual | 30.8 | 0.86 | 11 | 4.2 | 57.5 | albedo: 0.051 | MPC; JPL |
| 2016 UO_{273} | 28 October 2016 | DECam (W84) | 121 | twotino | 48.1 | 0.20 | 16 | 38.4 | 57.8 | albedo: 0.126 | MPC; JPL |
| 2016 UP_{273} | 28 October 2016 | DECam (W84) | 61 | SDO | 84.3 | 0.63 | 14 | 31.6 | 137.0 | albedo: 0.124 | MPC; JPL |
| 2016 UQ_{273} | 28 October 2016 | DECam (W84) | 185 | cubewano (hot)? | 43.6 | 0.15 | 29 | 37.1 | 50.2 | albedo: 0.079 | MPC; JPL |
| 2016 US_{109} | 19 October 2016 | Mt. Lemmon Survey (G96) | 2.3 | damocloid | 36.1 | 0.95 | 87 | 1.9 | 70.3 | albedo: 0.048 | MPC; JPL |
| 2016 WB_{75} | 30 November 2016 | DECam (W84) | 119 | cubewano (hot)? | 45.8 | 0.19 | 21 | 37.2 | 54.3 | albedo: 0.079 | MPC; JPL |
| 2016 WB_{88} | 28 November 2016 | COIAS,Subaru Telescope (T09) | 104 | cubewano (hot)? | 45.7 | 0.13 | 19 | 39.6 | 51.9 | albedo: 0.079 | MPC; JPL |
| 2016 WY_{85} | 28 November 2016 | COIAS,Subaru Telescope (T09) | 120 | cubewano (hot)? | 42.9 | 0.15 | 14 | 36.7 | 49.1 | albedo: 0.079 | MPC; JPL |
| 2016 XK_{24} | 11 December 2016 | WISE (C51) | 1.3 | amor | 133.4 | 0.99 | 146 | 1.3 | 265.6 | albedo: 0.048 | MPC; JPL |
| 2016 XO_{34} | 6 December 2016 | DECam (W84) | 131 | cubewano (hot) | 46.7 | 0.12 | 34 | 41.1 | 52.3 | albedo: 0.079 | MPC; JPL |
| 2016 YA_{39} | 25 December 2016 | COIAS,Subaru Telescope (T09) | 54 | other TNO | 47.4 | 0.36 | 12 | 30.4 | 64.4 | albedo: 0.13 | MPC; JPL |
| 2016 YB_{39} | 25 December 2016 | COIAS,Subaru Telescope (T09) | 67 | SDO | 56.4 | 0.36 | 22 | 35.9 | 77.0 | albedo: 0.124 | MPC; JPL |
| 2016 YB_{40} | 25 December 2016 | COIAS,Subaru Telescope (T09) | 107 | other TNO | 53.0 | 0.18 | 26 | 43.5 | 62.5 | albedo: 0.13 | MPC; JPL |
| 2016 YC_{46} | — | — | — | — | 46.0 | 0.15 | 13.3 | 38.9 | 53.1 | — | MPC; JPL |
| 2016 YK_{45} | 25 December 2016 | COIAS,Subaru Telescope (T09) | 61 | SDO | 100.0 | 0.63 | 23 | 37.0 | 163.0 | albedo: 0.124 | MPC; JPL |
| 2016 YX_{39} | 25 December 2016 | COIAS,Subaru Telescope (T09) | 65 | other TNO | 42.7 | 0.24 | 29 | 32.5 | 52.9 | albedo: 0.13 | MPC; JPL |
| 2016 YZ_{40} | 25 December 2016 | COIAS,Subaru Telescope (T09) | 79 | other TNO | 42.5 | 0.17 | 20 | 35.1 | 49.9 | albedo: 0.13 | MPC; JPL |

back to top
