= List of unnumbered trans-Neptunian objects: 2012 =

The following is a partial list of unnumbered trans-Neptunian objects for principal designations assigned within 2012. As of October 2026, it contains a total of 45 bodies. For more information see the description on the main page. Also see list for the previous and next year.

== 2012 ==
Designation	First Observed (discovered)		D (km)	Orbital description						Remarks	Refs
Designation	Date	Observer (Site)	D (km)	Class	a (AU)	e	i (°)	q (AU)	Q (AU)	Remarks	Refs
2012 BV_{154}	19 January 2012	Pan-STARRS 1 (F51)	197	cubewano (hot)?	47.0	0.20	12	37.6	56.4	albedo: 0.079	MPC · JPL
2012 BY_{154}	21 January 2012	Pan-STARRS 1 (F51)	156	res · 3:5	42.4	0.17	7	35.2	49.6	albedo: 0.126	MPC · JPL
2012 DQ_{106}	16 February 2012	Pan-STARRS 1 (F51)	134	res · 4:7?	43.9	0.17	1	36.4	51.3	albedo: 0.126	MPC · JPL
2012 DV_{121}	16 February 2012	Pan-STARRS 1 (F51)	148	SDO	64.4	0.44	33	36.1	92.7	albedo: 0.124	MPC · JPL
2012 DZ_{98}	16 February 2012	Pan-STARRS 1 (F51)	149	cubewano (cold)	42.8	0.02	3	41.8	43.7	albedo: 0.152	MPC · JPL
2012 FH_{84}	25 March 2012	Las Campanas Observatory (304)	140	SDO	58.1	0.31	4	40.4	75.8	albedo: 0.124	MPC · JPL
2012 FN_{84}	25 March 2012	Las Campanas Observatory (304)	104	SDO	52.5	0.35	8	34.1	70.9	albedo: 0.124	MPC · JPL
2012 GU_{11}	12 April 2012	Pan-STARRS 1 (F51)	87	centaur	175.8	0.90	11	18.2	333.4	albedo: 0.058	MPC · JPL
2012 GX17	14 April 2012	Pan-STARRS 1 (F51)	167	centaur	37.5	0.55	33	16.9	58.2	albedo: 0.058	MPC · JPL
2012 HD_{2}	18 April 2012	Spacewatch (691)	5	damocloid	61.0	0.96	147	2.6	119.4	albedo: 0.048	MPC · JPL
2012 HE85	18 April 2012	New Horizons KBO Search (268)	62	res · 5:9	44.3	0.09	3	40.1	48.5	albedo: 0.126	MPC · JPL
2012 HW_{87}	21 April 2012	Pan-STARRS 1 (F51)	114	SDO	90.9	0.64	14	32.4	149.4	albedo: 0.124	MPC · JPL
2012 OL_{6}	22 July 2012	Maunakea (568)	137	SDO	54.0	0.30	9	37.8	70.3	albedo: 0.124	MPC · JPL
2012 SB_{67}	26 September 2012	Pan-STARRS 1 (F51)	246	cubewano (hot)?	47.2	0.14	18	40.5	53.9	albedo: 0.079	MPC · JPL
2012 TE_{324}	8 October 2012	Pan-STARRS 1 (F51)	232	cubewano (hot)	46.4	0.13	6	40.6	52.2	albedo: 0.079	MPC · JPL
2012 TF_{324}	9 October 2012	Pan-STARRS 1 (F51)	227	cubewano (hot)	43.6	0.11	8	38.6	48.5	albedo: 0.079	MPC · JPL
2012 TF_{359}	6 October 2012	Pan-STARRS 1 (F51)	263	cubewano (hot)?	42.3	0.07	25	39.3	45.3	albedo: 0.079	MPC · JPL
2012 TL_{139}	9 October 2012	Pan-STARRS 1 (F51)	6	damocloid	30.2	0.88	160	3.6	56.9	albedo: 0.048	MPC · JPL
2012 UD_{178}	21 October 2012	Pan-STARRS 1 (F51)	122	res · 2:5	55.8	0.42	9	32.3	79.3	albedo: 0.126	MPC · JPL
2012 UE_{185}	23 October 2012	Pan-STARRS 1 (F51)	246	cubewano (hot)?	42.1	0.16	21	35.6	48.6	albedo: 0.079	MPC · JPL
2012 UG_{177}	20 October 2012	M. Alexandersen (568)	59	plutino	39.5	0.23	22	30.5	48.6	albedo: 0.074	MPC · JPL
2012 UH_{177}	21 October 2012	M. Alexandersen (568)	124	plutino	39.5	0.19	24	32.1	46.9	albedo: 0.074	MPC · JPL
2012 UJ_{177}	21 October 2012	M. Alexandersen (568)	57	res · 2:5	55.5	0.44	16	31.4	79.7	albedo: 0.126	MPC · JPL
2012 UK_{177}	20 October 2012	M. Alexandersen (568)	69	SDO	93.7	0.62	25	35.4	152.0	albedo: 0.124	MPC · JPL
2012 UL_{177}	20 October 2012	M. Alexandersen (568)	152	cubewano (hot)?	40.9	0.12	19	35.9	45.9	albedo: 0.079	MPC · JPL
2012 UM_{177}	20 October 2012	M. Alexandersen (568)	90	cubewano (hot)?	43.7	0.06	16	41.2	46.3	albedo: 0.079	MPC · JPL
2012 UN_{177}	20 October 2012	M. Alexandersen (568)	146	cubewano (hot)?	43.5	0.16	20	36.3	50.6	albedo: 0.079	MPC · JPL
2012 UO_{177}	21 October 2012	M. Alexandersen (568)	103	cubewano (hot)?	41.7	0.03	16	40.5	43.0	albedo: 0.079	MPC · JPL
2012 UP_{177}	21 October 2012	M. Alexandersen (568)	113	cubewano (hot)?	43.0	0.10	17	38.7	47.3	albedo: 0.079	MPC · JPL
2012 UQ_{177}	20 October 2012	M. Alexandersen (568)	91	SDO	52.4	0.32	20	35.7	69.1	albedo: 0.124	MPC · JPL
2012 UR_{177}	21 October 2012	M. Alexandersen (568)	99	SDO	74.7	0.50	16	37.5	111.8	albedo: 0.124	MPC · JPL
2012 US_{177}	21 October 2012	M. Alexandersen (568)	69	SDO	56.5	0.37	17	35.6	77.3	albedo: 0.124	MPC · JPL
2012 UT_{177}	21 October 2012	Maunakea (568)	143	cubewano (hot)?	47.7	0.12	16	41.8	53.5	albedo: 0.079	MPC · JPL
2012 UU_{177}	21 October 2012	Maunakea (568)	99	cubewano (hot)?	43.8	0.04	16	42.3	45.3	albedo: 0.079	MPC · JPL
2012 UV_{177}	20 October 2012	Maunakea (568)	77	nep trj	30.2	0.08	21	27.9	32.5	albedo: 0.058	MPC · JPL
2012 UW_{177}	20 October 2012	M. Alexandersen (568)	30	centaur	30.3	0.26	54	22.3	38.3	albedo: 0.058	MPC · JPL
2012 VB_{116}	8 November 2012	Pan-STARRS 1 (F51)	437	cubewano (hot)?	47.4	0.16	23	39.8	55.0	albedo: 0.079	MPC · JPL
2012 VP113	5 November 2012	Cerro Tololo Observatory, La Serena (807)	585	sednoid	267.5	0.70	24	80.6	454.3	albedo: 0.124; BRmag: 1.44	MPC · JPL
2012 WE_{37}	16 November 2012	Cerro Tololo-DECam (W84)	103	twotino	47.9	0.25	26	36.0	59.9	albedo: 0.126	MPC · JPL
2012 WF_{37}	16 November 2012	Cerro Tololo-DECam (W84)	110	plutino	39.7	0.30	19	27.9	51.5	albedo: 0.074; taxonomy: RR	MPC · JPL
2012 WG_{37}	19 November 2012	Cerro Tololo-DECam (W84)	181	SDO	49.4	0.35	14	32.3	66.4	albedo: 0.124	MPC · JPL
2012 XW_{159}	9 December 2012	Pan-STARRS 1 (F51)	162	plutino	39.8	0.21	21	31.3	48.3	albedo: 0.074	MPC · JPL
2012 YF_{12}	23 December 2012	Pan-STARRS 1 (F51)	294	cubewano (hot)?	43.9	0.14	28	37.6	50.1	albedo: 0.079	MPC · JPL
2012 YG_{12}	30 December 2012	Pan-STARRS 1 (F51)	194	plutino	39.7	0.22	31	31.0	48.4	albedo: 0.074	MPC · JPL
2012 YO_{9}	17 December 2012	Dark Energy Survey (W84)	109	res · 4:7	43.9	0.17	15	36.4	51.5	albedo: 0.126	MPC · JPL

back to top
