= List of unnumbered trans-Neptunian objects: 2005 =

The following is a partial list of unnumbered trans-Neptunian objects for principal designations assigned within 2005. As of October 2026, it contains a total of 67 bodies. For more information see the description on the main page. Also see list for the previous and next year.

== 2005 ==
Designation	First Observed (discovered)		D (km)	Orbital description						Remarks	Refs
Designation	Date	Observer (Site)	D (km)	Class	a (AU)	e	i (°)	q (AU)	Q (AU)	Remarks	Refs
2005 BV_{49}	16 January 2005	B. Gladman (568)	194	cubewano (hot)	43.9	0.05	8	41.7	46.1	albedo: 0.079	MPC · JPL
2005 BW_{49}	16 January 2005	B. Gladman (568)	165	cubewano (cold)	44.3	0.08	2	40.7	47.9	binary: 96 km; albedo: 0.152	MPC · JPL
2005 CD_{81}	10 February 2005	Canada-France Ecliptic Plane Survey (568)	200	plutino	39.4	0.15	21	33.6	45.2	albedo: 0.074	MPC · JPL
2005 CE_{81}	10 February 2005	B. Gladman (568)	113	cubewano (cold)	42.9	0.05	3	40.7	45.1	binary: 78 km; albedo: 0.152	MPC · JPL
2005 CF_{81}	10 February 2005	Canada-France Ecliptic Plane Survey (568)	78	res · 3:4	36.6	0.07	0	34.1	39.0	albedo: 0.126	MPC · JPL
2005 EB_{318}	9 March 2005	M. W. Buie (695)	152	cubewano (cold)	45.0	0.15	5	38.5	51.6	albedo: 0.152	MPC · JPL
2005 EC_{318}	11 March 2005	M. W. Buie (695)	184	cubewano (cold)	43.9	0.03	3	42.4	45.4	albedo: 0.152	MPC · JPL
2005 ED_{300}	11 March 2005	Kitt Peak (695)	124	cubewano (cold)?	43.9	0.08	2	40.4	47.5	albedo: 0.152	MPC · JPL
2005 EE_{296}	9 March 2005	M. W. Buie (695)	156	cubewano (cold)	44.3	0.07	3	41.4	47.2	albedo: 0.152	MPC · JPL
2005 EF_{304}	11 March 2005	M. W. Buie (695)	131	SDO	86.1	0.55	19	38.5	133.7	albedo: 0.124	MPC · JPL
2005 EH_{305}	11 March 2005	M. W. Buie (695)	248	cubewano (hot)?	41.6	0.50	6	20.7	62.4	albedo: 0.079	MPC · JPL
2005 EJ_{300}	11 March 2005	Kitt Peak (695)	119	cubewano (hot)?	43.1	0.00	22	43.1	43.1	albedo: 0.079	MPC · JPL
2005 EK_{298}	11 March 2005	Kitt Peak (695)	154	plutino?	39.6	0.13	40	34.4	44.7	albedo: 0.074	MPC · JPL
2005 EM_{303}	11 March 2005	M. W. Buie (695)	143	cubewano (hot)	43.5	0.02	6	42.7	44.3	albedo: 0.079	MPC · JPL
2005 EO_{296}	9 March 2005	Kitt Peak (695)	171	cubewano (cold)?	45.1	0.09	1	41.2	49.1	albedo: 0.152	MPC · JPL
2005 EP_{296}	9 March 2005	Kitt Peak (695)	124	cubewano (cold)?	46.8	0.00	3	46.8	46.8	albedo: 0.152	MPC · JPL
2005 EW_{318}	8 March 2005	H. G. Roe, M. E. Brown, K. M. Barkume (675)	183	cubewano (cold)	44.6	0.07	1	41.6	47.7	albedo: 0.152	MPC · JPL
2005 EX_{318}	8 March 2005	H. G. Roe, M. E. Brown, K. M. Barkume (675)	187	plutino	39.6	0.23	7	30.6	48.5	albedo: 0.074	MPC · JPL
2005 GA_{187}	10 April 2005	M. W. Buie (695)	154	plutino	39.2	0.22	19	30.8	47.6	albedo: 0.074	MPC · JPL
2005 GC_{187}	10 April 2005	M. W. Buie (695)	124	cubewano (cold)	44.0	0.12	2	38.5	49.4	albedo: 0.152	MPC · JPL
2005 GD_{187}	12 April 2005	M. W. Buie (695)	117	cubewano (cold)	43.2	0.02	1	42.4	43.9	binary: 75 km; albedo: 0.152	MPC · JPL
2005 GF_{187}	12 April 2005	M. W. Buie (695)	116	plutino	39.3	0.25	4	29.4	49.1	albedo: 0.074	MPC · JPL
2005 GH_{228}	5 April 2005	Canada-France Ecliptic Plane Survey (568)	78	res · 3:4?	36.8	0.19	17	29.8	43.9	albedo: 0.126	MPC · JPL
2005 GV_{210}	12 April 2005	M. W. Buie (695)	214	plutino	39.2	0.17	12	32.5	46.0	albedo: 0.074	MPC · JPL
2005 GW_{186}	10 April 2005	M. W. Buie (695)	263	cubewano (cold)?	39.6	0.10	3	35.5	43.7	albedo: 0.152	MPC · JPL
2005 GW_{210}	12 April 2005	Kitt Peak (695)	154	plutino?	39.7	0.27	25	28.9	50.4	albedo: 0.074	MPC · JPL
2005 GX_{186}	10 April 2005	M. W. Buie (695)	119	cubewano (cold)	44.0	0.02	4	43.2	44.8	albedo: 0.152	MPC · JPL
2005 GY_{206}	11 April 2005	Palomar Mountain (675)	141	plutino?	39.7	0.12	20	34.8	44.6	albedo: 0.074	MPC · JPL
2005 GZ_{186}	10 April 2005	Kitt Peak (695)	188	cubewano (hot)?	43.8	0.13	8	38.2	49.5	albedo: 0.079	MPC · JPL
2005 GZ_{206}	13 April 2005	H. G. Roe, M. E. Brown, K. M. Barkume (675)	172	cubewano (hot)?	41.8	0.05	28	39.6	43.9	albedo: 0.079	MPC · JPL
2005 JA_{186}	14 May 2005	P. A. Wiegert, A. Papadimos (568)	162	cubewano (cold)?	48.2	0.10	4	43.6	52.8	albedo: 0.152	MPC · JPL
2005 JB_{186}	14 May 2005	P. A. Wiegert, A. Papadimos (568)	136	cubewano (hot)?	41.3	0.10	20	37.1	45.5	albedo: 0.079	MPC · JPL
2005 JH_{177}	11 May 2005	M. W. Buie (807)	136	cubewano (cold)	44.4	0.09	3	40.2	48.6	albedo: 0.152	MPC · JPL
2005 JJ_{186}	12 May 2005	B. Gladman (568)	163	cubewano (cold)	44.4	0.09	4	40.4	48.4	albedo: 0.152	MPC · JPL
2005 JK_{186}	12 May 2005	Canada-France Ecliptic Plane Survey (568)	176	other TNO	47.1	0.24	27	35.7	58.4	albedo: 0.13	MPC · JPL
2005 JO_{179}	10 May 2005	Cerro Tololo Observatory, La Serena (807)	156	cubewano (cold)?	43.6	0.05	2	41.5	45.7	albedo: 0.152	MPC · JPL
2005 JQ_{179}	11 May 2005	Cerro Tololo Observatory, La Serena (807)	187	cubewano (cold)?	42.6	0.03	3	41.3	44.0	albedo: 0.152	MPC · JPL
2005 JR_{106}	12 May 2005	Spacewatch (691)	10	unusual	44.2	0.92	19	3.7	84.8	albedo: 0.051	MPC · JPL
2005 JY_{185}	12 May 2005	P. A. Wiegert, A. Papadimos (568)	149	cubewano (cold)	44.0	0.07	2	40.9	47.0	albedo: 0.152	MPC · JPL
2005 JZ_{174}	9 May 2005	M. W. Buie (807)	216	cubewano (hot)	42.5	0.07	7	39.5	45.5	albedo: 0.079	MPC · JPL
2005 LA_{54}	10 June 2005	B. Gladman (568)	237	cubewano (hot)	44.1	0.06	8	41.3	46.9	albedo: 0.079	MPC · JPL
2005 LB_{54}	10 June 2005	B. Gladman (568)	247	cubewano (cold)	43.5	0.04	3	41.6	45.4	albedo: 0.152	MPC · JPL
2005 LC_{54}	10 June 2005	Canada-France Ecliptic Plane Survey (568)	173	SDO	66.9	0.46	23	36.2	97.6	albedo: 0.124	MPC · JPL
2005 NU_{125}	7 July 2005	P. A. Wiegert, A. M. Gilbert (568)	187	SDO	80.6	0.51	37	39.8	121.3	albedo: 0.124	MPC · JPL
2005 OE	16 July 2005	CSS (703)	11	damocloid	62.8	0.95	68	3.1	122.6	albedo: 0.048	MPC · JPL
2005 PD_{23}	2 August 2005	Maunakea (568)	68	cubewano (cold)?	44.1	0.01	1	43.5	44.6	albedo: 0.152	MPC · JPL
2005 PE_{23}	2 August 2005	Maunakea (568)	38	cubewano (hot)?	43.8	0.04	21	42.0	45.6	albedo: 0.079	MPC · JPL
2005 PF_{23}	2 August 2005	Maunakea (568)	39	cubewano (cold)?	44.9	0.08	1	41.1	48.7	albedo: 0.152	MPC · JPL
2005 PG_{23}	2 August 2005	Maunakea (568)	47	cubewano (cold)?	45.9	0.18	2	37.5	54.2	albedo: 0.152	MPC · JPL
2005 PH_{23}	2 August 2005	Maunakea (568)	52	cubewano (cold)?	44.1	0.06	4	41.6	46.6	albedo: 0.152	MPC · JPL
2005 PK_{21}	8 August 2005	Cerro Tololo Observatory, La Serena (807)	177	cubewano (hot)	44.0	0.12	5	38.9	49.1	albedo: 0.079	MPC · JPL
2005 PL_{21}	8 August 2005	Cerro Tololo Observatory, La Serena (807)	153	cubewano (cold)	46.4	0.15	5	39.6	53.2	albedo: 0.152	MPC · JPL
2005 PM_{21}	8 August 2005	Cerro Tololo Observatory, La Serena (807)	226	cubewano (hot)?	43.7	0.14	29	37.8	49.6	albedo: 0.079	MPC · JPL
2005 PN_{21}	8 August 2005	Cerro Tololo Observatory, La Serena (807)	187	cubewano (cold)?	45.7	0.00	3	45.7	45.7	albedo: 0.152	MPC · JPL
2005 PO_{21}	8 August 2005	Cerro Tololo Observatory, La Serena (807)	142	cubewano (cold)?	43.3	0.00	3	43.3	43.3	albedo: 0.152	MPC · JPL
2005 PP_{21}	8 August 2005	Cerro Tololo Observatory, La Serena (807)	171	cubewano (cold)?	45.5	0.09	2	41.5	49.5	albedo: 0.152	MPC · JPL
2005 PS_{21}	9 August 2005	Cerro Tololo Observatory, La Serena (807)	152	cubewano (cold)	44.5	0.08	3	40.8	48.2	albedo: 0.152	MPC · JPL
2005 PT_{21}	9 August 2005	Cerro Tololo Observatory, La Serena (807)	138	SDO	74.5	0.52	8	36.0	113.1	albedo: 0.124	MPC · JPL
2005 RH_{52}	3 September 2005	Canada-France Ecliptic Plane Survey (568)	123	SDO	154.3	0.75	21	39.1	269.5	albedo: 0.124	MPC · JPL
2005 TN_{53}	7 October 2005	Las Campanas Observatory (304)	87	nep trj	30.3	0.07	25	28.2	32.5	albedo: 0.058; BRmag: 1.30	MPC · JPL
2005 TT_{227}	11 October 2005	Apache Point (705)	—	—	39.4	0.28	13	28.3	50.5	—	MPC · JPL
2005 TV_{189}	3 October 2005	Palomar Mountain (675)	146	plutino	39.7	0.19	34	32.0	47.4	possible binary; albedo: 0.074	MPC · JPL
2005 VA_{123}	2 November 2005	Kitt Peak (695)	169	plutino	39.8	0.25	2	29.8	49.7	albedo: 0.074	MPC · JPL
2005 VX3	1 November 2005	University of Arizona Mt. Lemmon Survey (G96)	9	damocloid	1020.0	1.00	113	4.1	2035.9	albedo: 0.048	MPC · JPL
2005 VZ_{122}	2 November 2005	Kitt Peak (695)	165	cubewano (hot)?	41.6	0.18	12	34.0	49.2	binary: 61 km; albedo: 0.079	MPC · JPL
2005 YL_{292}	24 December 2005	Maunakea (568)	94	cubewano (hot)?	44.7	0.15	5	38.0	51.4	albedo: 0.079	MPC · JPL
2005 YM_{292}	24 December 2005	Maunakea (568)	157	cubewano (hot)?	46.0	0.02	28	45.0	47.0	albedo: 0.079	MPC · JPL

back to top
