= List of unnumbered trans-Neptunian objects: 2010 =

The following is a partial list of unnumbered trans-Neptunian objects for principal designations assigned within 2010. As of October 2026, it contains a total of 43 bodies. For more information see the description on the main page. Also see list for the previous and next year.

== 2010 ==
Designation	First Observed (discovered)		D (km)	Orbital description						Remarks	Refs
Designation	Date	Observer (Site)	D (km)	Class	a (AU)	e	i (°)	q (AU)	Q (AU)	Remarks	Refs
2010 BK_{118}	30 January 2010	WISE (C51)	46	centaur	449.5	0.99	144	6.1	892.8	albedo: 0.068; BRmag: 1.32	MPC · JPL
2010 CG_{55}	15 February 2010	CSS (703)	10	damocloid	31.7	0.91	146	2.9	60.5	albedo: 0.048	MPC · JPL
2010 EB_{46}	12 March 2010	Catalina Sky Survey (703)	0.8	damocloid	33.6	0.95	157	1.5	65.6	albedo: 0.048	MPC · JPL
2010 EL_{139}	12 March 2010	A. Udalski, C. A. Trujillo, S. S. Sheppard, I. Soszynski (304)	406	plutino	39.3	0.07	23	36.7	41.8	albedo: 0.074	MPC · JPL
2010 EQ_{65}	10 March 2010	D. L. Rabinowitz, S. Tourtellotte (809)	189	SDO	60.2	0.41	25	35.8	84.7	albedo: 0.124	MPC · JPL
2010 EX_{175}	4 March 2010	WISE (C51)	2.4	damocloid	33.6	0.92	29	2.6	64.5	albedo: 0.048	MPC · JPL
2010 FX_{86}	17 March 2010	S. S. Sheppard, A. Udalski, I. Soszynski, C. A. Trujillo (304)	582	cubewano (hot)?	46.7	0.06	25	44.0	49.4	albedo: 0.079	MPC · JPL
2010 GB174	12 April 2010	Maunakea (568)	169	EDDO	360.2	0.87	22	48.5	671.9	albedo: 0.124	MPC · JPL
2010 GS_{136}	5 April 2010	Spacewatch (691)	17	centaur	36.1	0.82	84	6.4	65.8	albedo: 0.058	MPC · JPL
2010 GW_{147}	14 April 2010	WISE (C51)	16	centaur	174.4	0.97	100	5.4	343.4	albedo: 0.037	MPC · JPL
2010 GW_{64}	6 April 2010	WISE (C51)	6	damocloid	62.2	0.94	105	3.7	120.7	albedo: 0.047	MPC · JPL
2010 HD_{112}	20 April 2010	Las Campanas Observatory (304)	171	cubewano (cold)?	44.5	0.03	4	43.1	45.8	albedo: 0.152	MPC · JPL
2010 HG_{109}	21 April 2010	Las Campanas Observatory (304)	169	plutino?	39.8	0.23	29	30.5	49.1	albedo: 0.074	MPC · JPL
2010 JE_{215}	10 May 2010	Pan-STARRS 1 (F51)	119	centaur	61.7	0.56	11	27.2	96.1	albedo: 0.058	MPC · JPL
2010 JH_{124}	12 May 2010	WISE (C51)	7	damocloid	68.8	0.96	53	2.6	134.9	albedo: 0.052	MPC · JPL
2010 JJ_{124}	11 May 2010	A. Udalski, S. S. Sheppard, C. A. Trujillo (304)	249	centaur	83.0	0.72	38	23.6	142.3	albedo: 0.058	MPC · JPL
2010 JK_{124}	11 May 2010	C. A. Trujillo, A. Udalski, S. S. Sheppard (304)	314	other TNO	40.3	0.12	16	35.4	45.1	albedo: 0.13	MPC · JPL
2010 KZ_{39}	21 May 2010	A. Udalski, S. S. Sheppard, M. Szymanski, C. A. Trujillo (304)	743	cubewano (hot)?	45.0	0.05	26	42.6	47.4	albedo: 0.079	MPC · JPL
2010 LK_{109}	11 June 2010	Maunakea (568)	78	cubewano (hot)?	45.5	0.07	8	42.3	48.8	albedo: 0.079	MPC · JPL
2010 LP_{68}	11 June 2010	M. Yagi, Y. Komiyama, F. Nakata, S. Shinogi (568)	57	res · 3:4?	36.3	0.06	11	34.0	38.5	albedo: 0.126	MPC · JPL
2010 LQ_{68}	11 June 2010	M. Yagi, Y. Komiyama, F. Nakata, S. Shinogi (568)	113	res · 6:11	43.1	0.11	3	38.4	47.8	albedo: 0.126	MPC · JPL
2010 MR_{116}	19 June 2010	Pan-STARRS 1 (F51)	169	res · 1:3?	63.2	0.40	20	37.9	88.5	albedo: 0.126	MPC · JPL
2010 PU_{75}	6 August 2010	A. Udalski, S. S. Sheppard, G. Pietrzynski, C. A. Trujillo (304)	251	SDO	84.8	0.58	9	35.9	133.6	albedo: 0.124	MPC · JPL
2010 RF_{188}	15 September 2010	Pan-STARRS 1 (F51)	330	other TNO	46.9	0.30	14	33.0	60.8	albedo: 0.13; taxonomy: IR	MPC · JPL
2010 RJ_{190}	4 September 2010	Pan-STARRS 1 (F51)	154	cubewano (cold)	44.4	0.08	3	41.0	47.7	albedo: 0.152	MPC · JPL
2010 RM_{45}	5 September 2010	D. L. Rabinowitz, M. Schwamb, S. Tourtellotte (809)	293	cubewano (hot)?	46.3	0.15	19	39.3	53.4	albedo: 0.079	MPC · JPL
2010 RN_{45}	7 September 2010	D. L. Rabinowitz, M. Schwamb, S. Tourtellotte (809)	333	cubewano (hot)?	40.9	0.11	33	36.3	45.4	albedo: 0.079	MPC · JPL
2010 TA_{192}	7 October 2010	Pan-STARRS 1 (F51)	242	cubewano (hot)?	42.1	0.11	18	37.7	46.6	albedo: 0.079	MPC · JPL
2010 TD_{192}	8 October 2010	Pan-STARRS 1 (F51)	171	cubewano (cold)	43.4	0.03	4	42.1	44.7	albedo: 0.152	MPC · JPL
2010 TE_{192}	9 October 2010	Pan-STARRS 1 (F51)	248	cubewano (hot)?	41.5	0.05	21	39.3	43.6	albedo: 0.079	MPC · JPL
2010 TF_{192}	9 October 2010	Pan-STARRS 1 (F51)	205	cubewano (cold)	43.6	0.03	2	42.5	44.7	albedo: 0.152	MPC · JPL
2010 TG_{192}	9 October 2010	Pan-STARRS 1 (F51)	151	cubewano (cold)	44.3	0.06	1	41.6	46.9	albedo: 0.152	MPC · JPL
2010 TJ	2 October 2010	D. L. Rabinowitz, M. Schwamb, S. Tourtellotte (809)	317	SDO	63.2	0.37	39	40.0	86.4	albedo: 0.124; taxonomy: BB	MPC · JPL
2010 TJ_{182}	6 October 2010	Pan-STARRS 1 (F51)	71	plutino	39.9	0.28	10	28.7	51.1	albedo: 0.074	MPC · JPL
2010 TK_{192}	13 October 2010	Pan-STARRS 1 (F51)	223	cubewano (hot)?	46.6	0.12	37	41.0	52.1	albedo: 0.079	MPC · JPL
2010 TL_{182}	6 October 2010	Pan-STARRS 1 (F51)	166	cubewano (cold)	44.0	0.06	2	41.3	46.7	albedo: 0.152	MPC · JPL
2010 TN_{182}	6 October 2010	Pan-STARRS 1 (F51)	199	plutino	39.7	0.14	13	34.1	45.4	albedo: 0.074	MPC · JPL
2010 TP_{182}	7 October 2010	Pan-STARRS 1 (F51)	238	cubewano (hot)?	45.4	0.19	10	37.0	53.8	albedo: 0.079	MPC · JPL
2010 TS_{195}	7 October 2010	Pan-STARRS 1 (F51)	172	plutino	39.7	0.13	16	34.6	44.8	albedo: 0.074	MPC · JPL
2010 TT_{191}	9 October 2010	Pan-STARRS 1 (F51)	143	nep trj	30.3	0.06	4	28.3	32.2	albedo: 0.058; BRmag: 1.22	MPC · JPL
2010 VD_{253}	10 November 2010	Pan-STARRS 1 (F51)	271	cubewano (hot)?	43.0	0.09	24	39.0	47.0	albedo: 0.079	MPC · JPL
2010 VE_{253}	2 November 2010	Mt. Lemmon Survey (G96)	56	centaur	32.1	0.49	8	16.5	47.6	albedo: 0.058	MPC · JPL
2010 WM_{75}	17 November 2010	Pan-STARRS 1 (F51)	230	other TNO	50.9	0.17	23	42.1	59.6	albedo: 0.13	MPC · JPL

back to top
