= List of unnumbered trans-Neptunian objects: 2011 =

The following is a partial list of unnumbered trans-Neptunian objects for principal designations assigned within 2011. As of October 2026, it contains a total of 90 bodies. For more information see the description on the main page. Also see list for the previous and next year.

== 2011 ==
Designation	First Observed (discovered)		D (km)	Orbital description						Remarks	Refs
Designation	Date	Observer (Site)	D (km)	Class	a (AU)	e	i (°)	q (AU)	Q (AU)	Remarks	Refs
2011 BN_{170}	30 January 2011	Pan-STARRS 1 (F51)	172	SDO	71.8	0.51	13	34.9	108.7	albedo: 0.124	MPC · JPL
2011 BS_{163}	30 January 2011	Pan-STARRS 1 (F51)	178	cubewano (cold)	43.9	0.05	5	41.7	46.1	albedo: 0.152	MPC · JPL
2011 BT_{163}	30 January 2011	Pan-STARRS 1 (F51)	217	res · 5:12	54.2	0.34	33	35.8	72.6	albedo: 0.126	MPC · JPL
2011 BU_{163}	30 January 2011	Pan-STARRS 1 (F51)	141	res · 3:8?	58.0	0.38	21	35.7	80.3	albedo: 0.126	MPC · JPL
2011 CW_{119}	2 February 2011	Pan-STARRS 1 (F51)	112	res · 3:7	53.2	0.37	20	33.4	73.1	albedo: 0.126	MPC · JPL
2011 CX_{119}	4 February 2011	Pan-STARRS 1 (F51)	233	cubewano (hot)?	41.9	0.14	27	36.0	47.8	albedo: 0.079	MPC · JPL
2011 CY_{119}	4 February 2011	Pan-STARRS 1 (F51)	135	res · 1:3?	63.0	0.37	22	39.6	86.4	albedo: 0.126	MPC · JPL
2011 EZ_{90}	14 March 2011	Pan-STARRS 1 (F51)	238	cubewano (hot)?	41.2	0.07	27	38.2	44.2	albedo: 0.079	MPC · JPL
2011 GM_{89}	4 April 2011	Las Campanas Observatory (304)	143	SDO	52.7	0.31	17	36.6	68.7	albedo: 0.124	MPC · JPL
2011 HD_{103}	28 April 2011	New Horizons KBO Search (268)	77	other TNO	43.9	0.26	6	32.5	55.4	albedo: 0.13	MPC · JPL
2011 HE_{103}	28 April 2011	New Horizons KBO Search (268)	91	cubewano (hot)?	43.6	0.11	7	38.9	48.2	albedo: 0.079	MPC · JPL
2011 HF_{103}	29 April 2011	New Horizons KBO Search (268)	118	cubewano (cold)	42.8	0.05	3	40.7	45.0	albedo: 0.152	MPC · JPL
2011 HJ_{103}	28 April 2011	New Horizons KBO Search (268)	116	cubewano (hot)	46.4	0.15	5	39.3	53.4	albedo: 0.079	MPC · JPL
2011 HK_{103}	28 April 2011	New Horizons KBO Search (268)	110	other TNO	53.0	0.31	6	36.6	69.3	albedo: 0.13	MPC · JPL
2011 HL_{103}	28 April 2011	New Horizons KBO Search (268)	98	res · 3:5	41.9	0.12	14	36.7	47.1	albedo: 0.126	MPC · JPL
2011 HN_{104}	30 April 2011	Pan-STARRS 1 (F51)	121	plutino	39.2	0.29	18	27.8	50.7	albedo: 0.074	MPC · JPL
2011 HO_{60}	26 April 2011	European Southern Observatory, La Silla (809)	215	res · 2:11	93.1	0.61	22	36.6	149.6	albedo: 0.126	MPC · JPL
2011 HP_{83}	29 April 2011	European Southern Observatory, La Silla (809)	395	SDO	52.1	0.31	29	36.1	68.2	albedo: 0.124	MPC · JPL
2011 HZ_{102}	28 April 2011	New Horizons KBO Search (268)	66	cubewano (cold)	43.0	0.01	2	42.6	43.4	albedo: 0.152	MPC · JPL
2011 JA_{32}	2 May 2011	New Horizons KBO Search (268)	54	cubewano (cold)	46.4	0.13	3	40.3	52.5	albedo: 0.152	MPC · JPL
2011 JD_{32}	1 May 2011	New Horizons KBO Search (268)	69	SDO	50.0	0.31	13	34.3	65.7	albedo: 0.124	MPC · JPL
2011 JW_{31}	4 May 2011	New Horizons KBO Search (268)	86	cubewano (cold)	45.4	0.09	2	41.2	49.6	albedo: 0.152	MPC · JPL
2011 JY_{31}	4 May 2011	New Horizons KBO Search (268)	112	cubewano (cold)	43.8	0.06	3	41.4	46.2	binary: 79 km; albedo: 0.152	MPC · JPL
2011 KW_{48}	29 May 2011	New Horizons KBO Search-Subaru (266)	64	other TNO	37.5	0.14	4	32.4	42.7	albedo: 0.13	MPC · JPL
2011 LJ_{29}	6 June 2011	Pan-STARRS 1 (F51)	262	cubewano (cold)	43.9	0.08	0	40.4	47.5	albedo: 0.152	MPC · JPL
2011 OB_{60}	27 July 2011	Pan-STARRS 1 (F51)	159	SDO	101.3	0.64	20	36.7	166.0	albedo: 0.124	MPC · JPL
2011 OR_{17}	29 July 2011	Siding Spring Survey (E12)	15	damocloid	267.9	0.99	110	3.1	532.7	albedo: 0.048	MPC · JPL
2011 SW_{281}	26 September 2011	Pan-STARRS 1 (F51)	176	cubewano (cold)	46.8	0.10	5	42.2	51.4	albedo: 0.152; taxonomy: IR	MPC · JPL
2011 UA_{411}	26 October 2011	M. Alexandersen (568)	67	plutino	39.5	0.25	9	29.7	49.4	albedo: 0.074	MPC · JPL
2011 UA_{412}	24 October 2011	M. Alexandersen (568)	62	cubewano (cold)	46.5	0.15	3	39.4	53.6	albedo: 0.152	MPC · JPL
2011 UA_{413}	26 October 2011	M. Alexandersen (568)	69	res · 3:4	36.7	0.14	5	31.8	41.7	albedo: 0.126	MPC · JPL
2011 UB_{411}	26 October 2011	M. Alexandersen (568)	123	plutino?	39.8	0.04	15	38.1	41.5	albedo: 0.074	MPC · JPL
2011 UB_{412}	24 October 2011	M. Alexandersen (568)	124	cubewano (hot)?	43.7	0.06	15	41.3	46.1	albedo: 0.079	MPC · JPL
2011 UC_{412}	24 October 2011	M. Alexandersen (568)	93	cubewano (cold)	43.6	0.07	3	40.4	46.8	albedo: 0.152	MPC · JPL
2011 UD_{411}	26 October 2011	M. Alexandersen (568)	183	plutino	39.4	0.29	16	28.0	50.9	albedo: 0.074	MPC · JPL
2011 UD_{412}	24 October 2011	M. Alexandersen (568)	197	cubewano (hot)	45.6	0.06	6	43.0	48.2	albedo: 0.079	MPC · JPL
2011 UE_{411}	24 October 2011	M. Alexandersen (568)	52	twotino	48.0	0.33	9	32.4	63.7	albedo: 0.126	MPC · JPL
2011 UE_{412}	24 October 2011	M. Alexandersen (568)	216	cubewano (hot)?	43.7	0.11	23	38.9	48.4	albedo: 0.079	MPC · JPL
2011 UF_{411}	26 October 2011	M. Alexandersen (568)	77	twotino	48.2	0.35	6	31.2	65.2	albedo: 0.126	MPC · JPL
2011 UF_{412}	24 October 2011	M. Alexandersen (568)	78	cubewano (cold)	45.3	0.01	2	44.9	45.6	albedo: 0.152	MPC · JPL
2011 UG_{411}	26 October 2011	M. Alexandersen (568)	71	twotino	47.9	0.14	11	41.1	54.8	albedo: 0.126	MPC · JPL
2011 UG_{412}	26 October 2011	M. Alexandersen (568)	95	cubewano (cold)	46.7	0.16	3	39.4	54.0	albedo: 0.152	MPC · JPL
2011 UH_{411}	24 October 2011	M. Alexandersen (568)	70	other TNO	46.5	0.24	27	35.2	57.8	albedo: 0.13	MPC · JPL
2011 UH_{412}	26 October 2011	M. Alexandersen (568)	108	cubewano (hot)?	42.8	0.12	15	37.7	48.0	albedo: 0.079	MPC · JPL
2011 UJ_{411}	24 October 2011	M. Alexandersen (568)	78	res · 3:5	42.5	0.12	5	37.3	47.8	albedo: 0.126	MPC · JPL
2011 UJ_{412}	26 October 2011	M. Alexandersen (568)	113	cubewano (hot)?	42.2	0.03	30	41.0	43.4	albedo: 0.079	MPC · JPL
2011 UK_{412}	26 October 2011	M. Alexandersen (568)	124	cubewano (hot)?	40.9	0.09	26	37.1	44.8	albedo: 0.079	MPC · JPL
2011 UK_{413}	25 October 2011	Pan-STARRS 1 (F51)	231	cubewano (hot)?	41.8	0.09	14	38.2	45.5	albedo: 0.079	MPC · JPL
2011 UL_{411}	24 October 2011	M. Alexandersen (568)	68	res · 3:5	42.4	0.08	2	39.2	45.6	albedo: 0.126	MPC · JPL
2011 UL_{412}	26 October 2011	M. Alexandersen (568)	136	cubewano (hot)	43.2	0.08	10	39.7	46.7	albedo: 0.079	MPC · JPL
2011 UM_{411}	24 October 2011	M. Alexandersen (568)	124	res · 3:5	42.4	0.14	9	36.3	48.5	albedo: 0.126	MPC · JPL
2011 UM_{412}	26 October 2011	M. Alexandersen (568)	94	cubewano (hot)	45.6	0.13	11	39.5	51.7	albedo: 0.079	MPC · JPL
2011 UN_{411}	26 October 2011	M. Alexandersen (568)	54	res · 3:5	42.6	0.21	3	33.5	51.7	albedo: 0.126	MPC · JPL
2011 UN_{412}	24 October 2011	M. Alexandersen (568)	97	plutino?	39.1	0.06	20	36.9	41.3	albedo: 0.074	MPC · JPL
2011 UO_{411}	26 October 2011	M. Alexandersen (568)	68	res · 3:5	42.6	0.21	5	33.6	51.5	albedo: 0.126	MPC · JPL
2011 UO_{412}	26 October 2011	M. Alexandersen (568)	96	other TNO	38.2	0.13	28	33.4	42.9	albedo: 0.13	MPC · JPL
2011 UP_{410}	24 October 2011	M. Alexandersen (568)	102	plutino	39.9	0.18	3	32.7	47.1	albedo: 0.074	MPC · JPL
2011 UP_{411}	26 October 2011	M. Alexandersen (568)	78	res · 1:4	76.6	0.50	13	38.6	114.6	albedo: 0.126	MPC · JPL
2011 UP_{412}	24 October 2011	M. Alexandersen (568)	86	SDO	56.9	0.35	20	36.9	76.8	albedo: 0.124	MPC · JPL
2011 UQ_{410}	24 October 2011	M. Alexandersen (568)	62	plutino	39.6	0.26	3	29.1	50.1	albedo: 0.074	MPC · JPL
2011 UQ_{411}	26 October 2011	M. Alexandersen (568)	150	SDO	62.7	0.41	40	37.3	88.2	albedo: 0.124	MPC · JPL
2011 UQ_{412}	24 October 2011	M. Alexandersen (568)	107	res · 3:10?	68.2	0.49	17	34.8	101.6	albedo: 0.126	MPC · JPL
2011 UR_{410}	24 October 2011	M. Alexandersen (568)	56	plutino	39.7	0.27	17	28.8	50.6	albedo: 0.074	MPC · JPL
2011 UR_{411}	26 October 2011	M. Alexandersen (568)	75	SDO	62.6	0.44	27	35.0	90.1	albedo: 0.124	MPC · JPL
2011 UR_{412}	26 October 2011	M. Alexandersen (568)	66	SDO	50.5	0.32	18	34.3	66.7	albedo: 0.124	MPC · JPL
2011 US_{410}	24 October 2011	M. Alexandersen (568)	93	plutino	39.7	0.25	12	29.6	49.7	albedo: 0.074	MPC · JPL
2011 US_{411}	26 October 2011	M. Alexandersen (568)	54	res · 1:3	63.1	0.51	22	31.3	95.0	albedo: 0.126	MPC · JPL
2011 US_{412}	24 October 2011	M. Alexandersen (568)	98	cubewano (cold)?	48.1	0.16	3	40.2	56.1	albedo: 0.152	MPC · JPL
2011 UT_{411}	26 October 2011	M. Alexandersen (568)	113	res · 2:5	55.9	0.41	6	33.2	78.7	albedo: 0.126	MPC · JPL
2011 UT_{412}	26 October 2011	M. Alexandersen (568)	126	cubewano (hot)?	48.2	0.18	18	39.6	56.9	albedo: 0.079	MPC · JPL
2011 UU_{410}	24 October 2011	M. Alexandersen (568)	54	plutino	39.6	0.27	13	29.0	50.1	albedo: 0.074	MPC · JPL
2011 UU_{411}	24 October 2011	M. Alexandersen (568)	90	cubewano (cold)	44.2	0.03	2	42.6	45.7	albedo: 0.152	MPC · JPL
2011 UU_{412}	26 October 2011	Maunakea (568)	42	other TNO	39.3	0.17	23	32.8	45.9	albedo: 0.13	MPC · JPL
2011 UV_{410}	24 October 2011	M. Alexandersen (568)	126	plutino	39.7	0.26	4	29.3	50.0	albedo: 0.074	MPC · JPL
2011 UV_{411}	24 October 2011	M. Alexandersen (568)	78	cubewano (cold)	43.6	0.07	4	40.6	46.5	albedo: 0.152	MPC · JPL
2011 UV_{412}	24 October 2011	Maunakea (568)	93	other TNO	48.8	0.30	12	34.2	63.5	albedo: 0.13	MPC · JPL
2011 UW_{410}	26 October 2011	M. Alexandersen (568)	107	plutino	39.7	0.22	11	31.2	48.3	albedo: 0.074	MPC · JPL
2011 UW_{411}	24 October 2011	M. Alexandersen (568)	71	cubewano (cold)	44.1	0.17	5	36.6	51.6	albedo: 0.152	MPC · JPL
2011 UW_{412}	26 October 2011	Maunakea (568)	60	SDO	78.9	0.53	13	37.5	120.3	albedo: 0.124	MPC · JPL
2011 UX_{410}	26 October 2011	M. Alexandersen (568)	107	plutino	39.7	0.33	18	26.5	52.9	albedo: 0.074	MPC · JPL
2011 UX_{411}	24 October 2011	M. Alexandersen (568)	94	cubewano (hot)	42.6	0.10	7	38.4	46.8	albedo: 0.079	MPC · JPL
2011 UX_{412}	24 October 2011	Maunakea (568)	113	cubewano (hot)?	44.4	0.08	30	41.0	47.8	albedo: 0.079	MPC · JPL
2011 UY_{410}	26 October 2011	M. Alexandersen (568)	71	plutino	39.5	0.14	9	34.0	45.0	albedo: 0.074	MPC · JPL
2011 UY_{411}	24 October 2011	M. Alexandersen (568)	94	cubewano (cold)	44.4	0.07	2	41.4	47.5	albedo: 0.152	MPC · JPL
2011 UY_{412}	24 October 2011	Maunakea (568)	78	cubewano (hot)?	43.1	0.03	8	41.7	44.4	albedo: 0.079	MPC · JPL
2011 UZ_{410}	26 October 2011	M. Alexandersen (568)	107	plutino	39.7	0.12	4	34.8	44.5	albedo: 0.074	MPC · JPL
2011 UZ_{411}	24 October 2011	M. Alexandersen (568)	94	cubewano (cold)	45.7	0.05	1	43.4	48.1	albedo: 0.152	MPC · JPL
2011 UZ_{412}	24 October 2011	M. Alexandersen (568)	50	res · 3:4	36.7	0.14	7	31.6	41.7	albedo: 0.126	MPC · JPL
2011 WS_{41}	24 November 2011	Pan-STARRS 1 (F51)	1.9	damocloid	37.4	0.94	142	2.1	72.8	albedo: 0.048	MPC · JPL
2011 WW_{188}	25 November 2011	Pan-STARRS 1 (F51)	133	SDO	51.8	0.31	26	35.8	67.9	albedo: 0.124	MPC · JPL

back to top
