= List of unnumbered trans-Neptunian objects: 2006 =

The following is a partial list of unnumbered trans-Neptunian objects for principal designations assigned within 2006. As of October 2026, it contains a total of 76 bodies. For more information see the description on the main page. Also see list for the previous and next year.

== 2006 ==
Designation	First Observed (discovered)		D (km)	Orbital description						Remarks	Refs
Designation	Date	Observer (Site)	D (km)	Class	a (AU)	e	i (°)	q (AU)	Q (AU)	Remarks	Refs
2006 AK_{98}	5 January 2006	Maunakea (568)	136	cubewano (hot)?	44.2	0.16	18	37.1	51.3	albedo: 0.079	MPC · JPL
2006 AL_{98}	5 January 2006	Maunakea (568)	60	SDO	61.0	0.42	10	35.5	86.6	albedo: 0.124	MPC · JPL
2006 AM_{98}	5 January 2006	Maunakea (568)	124	res · 1:9?	133.9	0.73	13	35.9	231.8	albedo: 0.126	MPC · JPL
2006 AN_{98}	5 January 2006	Maunakea (568)	82	cubewano (cold)	43.3	0.04	2	41.7	44.9	albedo: 0.152	MPC · JPL
2006 AO_{101}	5 January 2006	Maunakea (568)	182	other TNO	47.7	0.36	1	30.5	64.8	albedo: 0.13	MPC · JPL
2006 AO_{98}	5 January 2006	Maunakea (568)	97	other TNO	38.1	0.09	24	34.7	41.5	albedo: 0.13	MPC · JPL
2006 BR_{284}	31 January 2006	Maunakea (568)	90	cubewano (cold)	44.0	0.05	1	42.1	46.0	binary: 71 km; albedo: 0.22	MPC · JPL
2006 BS_{284}	31 January 2006	Canada-France Ecliptic Plane Survey (568)	173	SDO	59.9	0.44	5	33.5	86.4	albedo: 0.124	MPC · JPL
2006 CH_{69}	3 February 2006	P. A. Wiegert, A. Papadimos (568)	100	cubewano (cold)	46.0	0.04	2	44.1	47.9	binary: 82 km; albedo: 0.23	MPC · JPL
2006 EX_{52}	5 March 2006	CSS (703)	7	damocloid	42.4	0.94	150	2.6	82.3	albedo: 0.048	MPC · JPL
2006 HA_{123}	27 April 2006	M. W. Buie (807)	124	cubewano (cold)	42.6	0.05	3	40.7	44.5	albedo: 0.152	MPC · JPL
2006 HB_{123}	28 April 2006	M. W. Buie (807)	123	cubewano (cold)	43.9	0.09	2	40.1	47.7	albedo: 0.152	MPC · JPL
2006 HC_{123}	28 April 2006	M. W. Buie (807)	128	res · 3:4	36.4	0.14	13	31.3	41.5	albedo: 0.126	MPC · JPL
2006 HD_{123}	28 April 2006	M. W. Buie (807)	121	res · 5:9	44.3	0.11	3	39.6	49.0	albedo: 0.126	MPC · JPL
2006 HE_{123}	28 April 2006	M. W. Buie (807)	130	cubewano (cold)	43.9	0.07	4	40.8	46.9	albedo: 0.152	MPC · JPL
2006 HG_{123}	26 April 2006	M. W. Buie (807)	112	other TNO	34.3	0.10	27	30.7	37.9	albedo: 0.13	MPC · JPL
2006 HN_{122}	26 April 2006	M. W. Buie (807)	136	cubewano (hot)?	46.1	0.19	8	37.4	54.9	albedo: 0.079	MPC · JPL
2006 HO_{122}	26 April 2006	M. W. Buie (807)	96	SDO	68.8	0.50	17	34.7	103.0	albedo: 0.124	MPC · JPL
2006 HP_{122}	26 April 2006	M. W. Buie (807)	166	cubewano (hot)	46.1	0.17	9	38.5	53.7	albedo: 0.079	MPC · JPL
2006 HR_{122}	26 April 2006	M. W. Buie (807)	114	SDO	61.8	0.37	4	38.8	84.9	albedo: 0.124	MPC · JPL
2006 HS_{122}	26 April 2006	Cerro Tololo Observatory, La Serena (807)	183	centaur	45.0	0.37	4	28.2	61.8	albedo: 0.058	MPC · JPL
2006 HT_{122}	26 April 2006	M. W. Buie (807)	138	plutino	39.2	0.16	7	32.8	45.6	albedo: 0.074	MPC · JPL
2006 HW_{122}	27 April 2006	M. W. Buie (807)	158	cubewano (cold)	45.3	0.07	2	42.3	48.4	albedo: 0.152	MPC · JPL
2006 HX_{122}	27 April 2006	M. W. Buie (807)	224	res · 2:7?	70.0	0.49	13	35.8	104.2	albedo: 0.126	MPC · JPL
2006 HY_{122}	27 April 2006	M. W. Buie (807)	106	cubewano (cold)	42.6	0.03	3	41.4	43.9	albedo: 0.152	MPC · JPL
2006 HZ_{122}	27 April 2006	M. W. Buie (807)	143	cubewano (hot)?	46.9	0.18	30	38.3	55.4	albedo: 0.079	MPC · JPL
2006 JU_{58}	1 May 2006	M. W. Buie (695)	219	cubewano (hot)	46.1	0.13	7	40.2	52.0	albedo: 0.079	MPC · JPL
2006 JV_{58}	1 May 2006	M. W. Buie (695)	161	cubewano (cold)	44.8	0.06	0	42.2	47.4	binary: 97 km; albedo: 0.152	MPC · JPL
2006 JW_{81}	1 May 2006	Maunakea (568)	136	cubewano (cold)?	44.9	0.01	1	44.3	45.6	albedo: 0.152	MPC · JPL
2006 LM_{1}	3 June 2006	University of Arizona Mt. Lemmon Survey (G96)	7	damocloid	37.2	0.90	172	3.7	70.7	albedo: 0.048	MPC · JPL
2006 OC_{22}	19 July 2006	P. A. Wiegert, A. Papadimos (568)	163	cubewano (cold)?	43.1	0.02	1	42.4	43.9	albedo: 0.152	MPC · JPL
2006 QA_{181}	21 August 2006	Cerro Tololo Observatory, La Serena (807)	103	cubewano (cold)	42.5	0.09	5	38.8	46.2	albedo: 0.152	MPC · JPL
2006 QB_{181}	21 August 2006	Cerro Tololo Observatory, La Serena (807)	124	cubewano (cold)	43.9	0.04	2	42.3	45.6	albedo: 0.152	MPC · JPL
2006 QC_{181}	21 August 2006	Cerro Tololo Observatory, La Serena (807)	226	cubewano (hot)?	43.9	0.13	23	38.3	49.4	albedo: 0.079	MPC · JPL
2006 QD_{181}	21 August 2006	Cerro Tololo Observatory, La Serena (807)	154	other TNO	38.7	0.02	2	37.8	39.6	albedo: 0.13	MPC · JPL
2006 QF_{181}	21 August 2006	Cerro Tololo Observatory, La Serena (807)	142	cubewano (cold)	45.0	0.08	3	41.4	48.5	binary: 84 km; albedo: 0.152	MPC · JPL
2006 QG_{181}	21 August 2006	Cerro Tololo Observatory, La Serena (807)	87	centaur	58.0	0.65	7	20.5	95.6	albedo: 0.058	MPC · JPL
2006 QH_{181}	21 August 2006	Cerro Tololo Observatory, La Serena (807)	446	res · 4:13	66.2	0.41	19	38.8	93.6	albedo: 0.126	MPC · JPL
2006 QK_{181}	22 August 2006	Cerro Tololo Observatory, La Serena (807)	164	cubewano (hot)?	42.9	0.13	20	37.6	48.3	albedo: 0.079	MPC · JPL
2006 QL_{181}	22 August 2006	Cerro Tololo Observatory, La Serena (807)	118	cubewano (cold)?	43.1	0.10	2	38.9	47.4	albedo: 0.152	MPC · JPL
2006 QM_{181}	22 August 2006	Cerro Tololo Observatory, La Serena (807)	156	cubewano (cold)?	45.6	0.07	3	42.6	48.6	albedo: 0.152	MPC · JPL
2006 QN_{181}	22 August 2006	Cerro Tololo Observatory, La Serena (807)	150	cubewano (hot)?	44.7	0.13	21	38.8	50.5	albedo: 0.079	MPC · JPL
2006 QO_{181}	22 August 2006	Cerro Tololo Observatory, La Serena (807)	149	cubewano (cold)?	43.8	0.03	3	42.6	45.1	albedo: 0.152	MPC · JPL
2006 QP_{180}	28 August 2006	A. C. Becker, A. W. Puckett, J. Kubica (705)	66	centaur	38.1	0.65	5	13.2	63.0	albedo: 0.058	MPC · JPL
2006 QP_{181}	22 August 2006	Cerro Tololo Observatory, La Serena (807)	147	other TNO	38.5	0.04	27	36.9	40.1	albedo: 0.13	MPC · JPL
2006 QQ_{181}	22 August 2006	Cerro Tololo Observatory, La Serena (807)	130	cubewano (cold)?	45.0	0.09	1	41.1	49.0	albedo: 0.152	MPC · JPL
2006 QR_{181}	22 August 2006	Cerro Tololo Observatory, La Serena (807)	162	cubewano (hot)?	46.8	0.20	10	37.4	56.1	albedo: 0.079	MPC · JPL
2006 QS_{180}	21 August 2006	Cerro Tololo Observatory, La Serena (807)	134	SDO	56.1	0.31	27	38.6	73.7	albedo: 0.124	MPC · JPL
2006 QS_{181}	22 August 2006	Cerro Tololo Observatory, La Serena (807)	95	SDO	56.9	0.43	15	32.6	81.3	albedo: 0.124	MPC · JPL
2006 QT_{180}	21 August 2006	Cerro Tololo Observatory, La Serena (807)	135	SDO	77.9	0.57	21	33.6	122.3	albedo: 0.124	MPC · JPL
2006 QU_{180}	21 August 2006	Cerro Tololo Observatory, La Serena (807)	298	cubewano (hot)?	41.9	0.16	20	35.3	48.5	albedo: 0.079	MPC · JPL
2006 QV_{180}	21 August 2006	Cerro Tololo Observatory, La Serena (807)	237	cubewano (hot)?	44.8	0.01	14	44.2	45.3	albedo: 0.079	MPC · JPL
2006 QW_{180}	21 August 2006	Cerro Tololo Observatory, La Serena (807)	117	other TNO	38.1	0.20	12	30.7	45.6	albedo: 0.13	MPC · JPL
2006 QX_{180}	21 August 2006	Cerro Tololo Observatory, La Serena (807)	136	cubewano (cold)?	45.6	0.10	3	40.9	50.3	albedo: 0.152	MPC · JPL
2006 QY_{180}	21 August 2006	Cerro Tololo Observatory, La Serena (807)	124	cubewano (cold)?	42.6	0.16	3	35.7	49.4	albedo: 0.152	MPC · JPL
2006 QZ_{180}	21 August 2006	Cerro Tololo Observatory, La Serena (807)	136	cubewano (hot)?	46.3	0.03	24	44.8	47.8	albedo: 0.079	MPC · JPL
2006 SE_{415}	18 September 2006	Maunakea (568)	143	cubewano (hot)?	42.6	0.03	19	41.6	43.7	albedo: 0.079	MPC · JPL
2006 SF_{369}	30 September 2006	A. C. Becker, A. W. Puckett, J. Kubica (705)	161	res · 1:3?	63.2	0.38	28	39.2	87.2	binary: 113 km; albedo: 0.126	MPC · JPL
2006 SF_{415}	18 September 2006	Maunakea (568)	124	cubewano (hot)?	43.2	0.08	16	39.9	46.6	albedo: 0.079	MPC · JPL
2006 SG_{415}	18 September 2006	Maunakea (568)	103	twotino	48.1	0.29	31	34.0	62.2	albedo: 0.126; taxonomy: IR	MPC · JPL
2006 SH_{415}	18 September 2006	Maunakea (568)	94	SDO	49.9	0.26	25	37.1	62.7	albedo: 0.124	MPC · JPL
2006 SL_{371}	27 September 2006	A. C. Becker, A. W. Puckett, J. Kubica (705)	108	twotino?	48.8	0.28	22	35.2	62.5	albedo: 0.126	MPC · JPL
2006 TK_{121}	15 October 2006	Cerro Tololo Observatory, La Serena (807)	144	plutino	39.7	0.26	27	29.5	49.8	albedo: 0.074	MPC · JPL
2006 TM_{130}	13 October 2006	Maunakea (568)	124	cubewano (hot)?	43.6	0.20	7	35.0	52.1	albedo: 0.079	MPC · JPL
2006 TP_{130}	13 October 2006	P. A. Wiegert, A. M. Gilbert (568)	245	plutino	39.5	0.27	5	28.7	50.3	albedo: 0.074	MPC · JPL
2006 UK_{321}	19 October 2006	Kitt Peak (695)	166	cubewano (cold)?	43.9	0.11	3	39.3	48.5	albedo: 0.152	MPC · JPL
2006 UM_{321}	19 October 2006	Kitt Peak (695)	95	cubewano (cold)?	47.2	0.10	4	42.5	51.8	albedo: 0.152	MPC · JPL
2006 UP_{321}	19 October 2006	Kitt Peak (695)	186	plutino?	39.7	0.14	11	34.0	45.3	albedo: 0.074	MPC · JPL
2006 UQ_{321}	19 October 2006	Kitt Peak (695)	98	cubewano (cold)?	43.4	0.14	3	37.2	49.6	albedo: 0.152	MPC · JPL
2006 UR_{321}	19 October 2006	Kitt Peak (695)	97	plutino?	39.3	0.22	3	30.7	47.9	albedo: 0.074	MPC · JPL
2006 US_{321}	19 October 2006	Kitt Peak (695)	68	cubewano (cold)?	45.0	0.11	2	40.3	49.8	albedo: 0.152	MPC · JPL
2006 UT_{321}	19 October 2006	Kitt Peak (695)	73	centaur	38.7	0.26	5	28.5	48.8	albedo: 0.058	MPC · JPL
2006 UY_{184}	22 October 2006	La Palma (950)	130	cubewano (cold)?	47.8	0.29	2	33.9	61.8	albedo: 0.152	MPC · JPL
2006 WF_{206}	23 November 2006	B. Gladman (568)	157	cubewano (cold)	43.7	0.05	2	41.6	45.8	binary: 104 km; albedo: 0.152	MPC · JPL
2006 WG_{206}	23 November 2006	Canada-France Ecliptic Plane Survey (568)	156	SDO	50.7	0.29	14	35.8	65.6	albedo: 0.124	MPC · JPL
2006 WS_{195}	24 November 2006	Maunakea (568)	152	plutino	39.5	0.23	33	30.3	48.7	albedo: 0.074	MPC · JPL

back to top
