= List of unnumbered trans-Neptunian objects: 2007 =

The following is a partial list of unnumbered trans-Neptunian objects for principal designations assigned within 2007. As of October 2026, it contains a total of 44 bodies. For more information see the description on the main page. Also see list for the previous and next year.

== 2007 ==
| Designation | First Observed (discovered) | | D (km) | Orbital description | | | | | | Remarks | Refs |
| Designation | Date | Observer (Site) | D (km) | Class | a (AU) | e | i (°) | q (AU) | Q (AU) | Remarks | Refs |
|---|---|---|---|---|---|---|---|---|---|---|---|
| 2007 BO_{81} | 19 January 2007 | P. A. Wiegert (568) | 125 | SDO | 54.6 | 0.34 | 10 | 36.0 | 73.2 | albedo: 0.124 | MPC · JPL |
| 2007 CJ_{66} | 14 February 2007 | P. A. Wiegert (568) | 127 | cubewano (cold) | 43.6 | 0.03 | 3 | 42.3 | 44.9 | albedo: 0.152 | MPC · JPL |
| 2007 CK_{66} | 14 February 2007 | Maunakea (568) | 98 | cubewano (cold)? | 45.3 | 0.18 | 2 | 37.1 | 53.5 | albedo: 0.152 | MPC · JPL |
| 2007 CQ_{79} | 14 February 2007 | P. A. Wiegert, A. Papadimos (568) | 145 | cubewano (cold) | 45.6 | 0.08 | 1 | 42.1 | 49.1 | possible binary; albedo: 0.152 | MPC · JPL |
| 2007 CR_{79} | 14 February 2007 | P. A. Wiegert, A. Papadimos (568) | 157 | cubewano (hot)? | 47.4 | 0.22 | 22 | 36.8 | 57.9 | albedo: 0.079 | MPC · JPL |
| 2007 CS_{79} | 14 February 2007 | P. A. Wiegert, A. Papadimos (568) | 153 | cubewano (cold) | 44.4 | 0.04 | 2 | 42.6 | 46.1 | albedo: 0.152 | MPC · JPL |
| 2007 CT_{79} | 14 February 2007 | Maunakea (568) | 103 | cubewano (hot)? | 43.3 | 0.15 | 25 | 37.0 | 49.5 | albedo: 0.079 | MPC · JPL |
| 2007 CU_{79} | 14 February 2007 | Maunakea (568) | 78 | cubewano (cold)? | 43.2 | 0.03 | 3 | 42.1 | 44.3 | albedo: 0.152 | MPC · JPL |
| 2007 CV_{79} | 14 February 2007 | Maunakea (568) | 94 | cubewano (cold)? | 45.4 | 0.03 | 1 | 44.0 | 46.7 | albedo: 0.152 | MPC · JPL |
| 2007 CW_{79} | 14 February 2007 | Maunakea (568) | 78 | cubewano (cold)? | 43.0 | 0.02 | 2 | 42.3 | 43.7 | albedo: 0.152 | MPC · JPL |
| 2007 CX_{79} | 14 February 2007 | Maunakea (568) | 113 | cubewano (hot)? | 44.6 | 0.08 | 26 | 41.1 | 48.2 | albedo: 0.079 | MPC · JPL |
| 2007 DA_{61} | 25 February 2007 | Mt. Lemmon Survey (G96) | 6 | damocloid | 423.0 | 0.99 | 77 | 2.6 | 843.4 | albedo: 0.048 | MPC · JPL |
| 2007 DS_{101} | 18 February 2007 | Maunakea (568) | 158 | cubewano (cold) | 44.2 | 0.09 | 1 | 40.4 | 47.9 | binary: 100 km; albedo: 0.152 | MPC · JPL |
| 2007 FM_{51} | 21 March 2007 | Maunakea (568) | 224 | cubewano (hot)? | 45.7 | 0.16 | 29 | 38.2 | 53.1 | albedo: 0.079 | MPC · JPL |
| 2007 FN_{51} | 21 March 2007 | Maunakea (568) | 118 | res · 1:5 | 88.3 | 0.62 | 23 | 33.3 | 143.3 | albedo: 0.126 | MPC · JPL |
| 2007 FO_{51} | 21 March 2007 | Maunakea (568) | 138 | SDO | 50.6 | 0.29 | 28 | 35.9 | 65.2 | albedo: 0.124 | MPC · JPL |
| 2007 FP_{51} | 21 March 2007 | Maunakea (568) | 111 | cubewano (hot)? | 44.9 | 0.21 | 26 | 35.7 | 54.1 | albedo: 0.079 | MPC · JPL |
| 2007 HV_{90} | 21 April 2007 | M. W. Buie (807) | 163 | cubewano (cold) | 43.8 | 0.06 | 3 | 41.3 | 46.4 | albedo: 0.152 | MPC · JPL |
| 2007 JF_{45} | 12 May 2007 | Palomar Mountain (675) | 313 | plutino | 39.2 | 0.09 | 11 | 35.7 | 42.7 | albedo: 0.074 | MPC · JPL |
| 2007 LE_{38} | 12 June 2007 | Maunakea (568) | 138 | other TNO | 53.8 | 0.22 | 36 | 41.8 | 65.8 | albedo: 0.13 | MPC · JPL |
| 2007 LF_{38} | 12 June 2007 | Maunakea (568) | 247 | res · 1:5? | 87.1 | 0.55 | 36 | 38.8 | 135.4 | albedo: 0.126 | MPC · JPL |
| 2007 LG_{38} | 12 June 2007 | Maunakea (568) | 82 | res · 2:5 | 55.2 | 0.43 | 33 | 31.3 | 79.0 | albedo: 0.126 | MPC · JPL |
| 2007 LH_{38} | 12 June 2007 | Maunakea (568) | 104 | SDO | 132.4 | 0.72 | 34 | 36.8 | 228.0 | albedo: 0.124 | MPC · JPL |
| 2007 LJ_{38} | 12 June 2007 | Maunakea (568) | 122 | SDO | 71.8 | 0.47 | 32 | 38.4 | 105.3 | albedo: 0.124 | MPC · JPL |
| 2007 RL_{314} | 14 September 2007 | P. A. Wiegert, A. Papadimos (568) | 192 | cubewano (hot)? | 40.4 | 0.04 | 21 | 38.9 | 41.9 | albedo: 0.079 | MPC · JPL |
| 2007 RN_{314} | 14 September 2007 | Maunakea (568) | 237 | cubewano (hot)? | 44.6 | 0.04 | 23 | 42.8 | 46.5 | albedo: 0.079 | MPC · JPL |
| 2007 RO_{314} | 14 September 2007 | Maunakea (568) | 130 | cubewano (hot)? | 45.1 | 0.10 | 14 | 40.7 | 49.6 | albedo: 0.079 | MPC · JPL |
| 2007 RP_{314} | 14 September 2007 | P. A. Wiegert, A. Papadimos (568) | 107 | cubewano (hot)? | 41.8 | 0.10 | 12 | 37.8 | 45.7 | albedo: 0.079 | MPC · JPL |
| 2007 RW_{326} | 6 September 2007 | Maunakea (568) | 82 | cubewano (hot)? | 46.0 | 0.24 | 21 | 35.2 | 56.8 | albedo: 0.079 | MPC · JPL |
| 2007 RX_{326} | 6 September 2007 | Maunakea (568) | 150 | cubewano (hot)? | 46.1 | 0.16 | 25 | 38.9 | 53.3 | albedo: 0.079 | MPC · JPL |
| 2007 RY_{326} | 6 September 2007 | Maunakea (568) | 105 | other TNO | 38.9 | 0.07 | 26 | 36.1 | 41.6 | albedo: 0.13 | MPC · JPL |
| 2007 RZ_{326} | 6 September 2007 | Maunakea (568) | 78 | SDO | 52.9 | 0.35 | 37 | 34.4 | 71.4 | albedo: 0.124 | MPC · JPL |
| 2007 TB_{418} | 4 October 2007 | Cerro Tololo Observatory, La Serena (807) | 241 | SDO | 57.5 | 0.41 | 7 | 33.9 | 81.1 | albedo: 0.124 | MPC · JPL |
| 2007 TC_{418} | 6 October 2007 | Cerro Tololo Observatory, La Serena (807) | 143 | cubewano (hot)? | 55.4 | 0.38 | 11 | 34.3 | 76.4 | albedo: 0.079 | MPC · JPL |
| 2007 TC_{434} | 15 October 2007 | Las Campanas Observatory (304) | 135 | res · 1:9 | 131.6 | 0.70 | 27 | 39.7 | 223.5 | albedo: 0.126 | MPC · JPL |
| 2007 TD_{418} | 8 October 2007 | Cerro Tololo Observatory, La Serena (807) | 97 | other TNO | 48.6 | 0.19 | 15 | 39.2 | 58.0 | albedo: 0.13 | MPC · JPL |
| 2007 TQ_{436} | 14 October 2007 | Maunakea (568) | 49 | plutino? | 39.8 | 0.25 | 9 | 29.7 | 49.8 | albedo: 0.074 | MPC · JPL |
| 2007 TR_{436} | 14 October 2007 | Maunakea (568) | 69 | centaur | 63.0 | 0.60 | 32 | 25.5 | 100.5 | albedo: 0.058 | MPC · JPL |
| 2007 TU_{431} | 14 October 2007 | Maunakea (568) | 46 | centaur | 198.0 | 0.90 | 7 | 20.9 | 375.2 | albedo: 0.058 | MPC · JPL |
| 2007 TV_{431} | 14 October 2007 | Maunakea (568) | 67 | plutino | 39.8 | 0.24 | 2 | 30.3 | 49.2 | albedo: 0.074 | MPC · JPL |
| 2007 TW_{431} | 15 October 2007 | Las Campanas Observatory (304) | 226 | cubewano (hot)? | 46.0 | 0.17 | 26 | 38.2 | 53.8 | albedo: 0.079 | MPC · JPL |
| 2007 TX_{431} | 15 October 2007 | Maunakea (568) | 96 | centaur | 47.7 | 0.44 | 17 | 26.7 | 68.7 | albedo: 0.058 | MPC · JPL |
| 2007 VJ_{302} | 3 November 2007 | Cerro Tololo Observatory, La Serena (807) | 201 | cubewano (hot) | 43.3 | 0.07 | 9 | 40.2 | 46.4 | albedo: 0.079 | MPC · JPL |
| 2007 VK_{302} | 11 November 2007 | Cerro Tololo Observatory, La Serena (807) | 182 | cubewano (hot)? | 46.0 | 0.03 | 27 | 44.7 | 47.3 | albedo: 0.079 | MPC · JPL |

back to top
