= List of unnumbered trans-Neptunian objects: 2009 =

The following is a partial list of unnumbered trans-Neptunian objects for principal designations assigned within 2009. As of October 2026, it contains a total of 44 bodies. For more information see the description on the main page. Also see list for the previous and next year.

== 2009 ==
Designation	First Observed (discovered)		D (km)	Orbital description						Remarks	Refs
Designation	Date	Observer (Site)	D (km)	Class	a (AU)	e	i (°)	q (AU)	Q (AU)	Remarks	Refs
2009 DD_{47}	27 February 2009	LINEAR (704)	4	damocloid	41.0	0.95	107	2.2	79.9	albedo: 0.048	MPC · JPL
2009 DJ_{143}	18 February 2009	Maunakea (568)	183	res · 4:13	65.8	0.43	18	37.4	94.2	albedo: 0.126	MPC · JPL
2009 DK_{143}	18 February 2009	Maunakea (568)	75	cubewano (hot)?	43.7	0.18	10	35.9	51.4	albedo: 0.079	MPC · JPL
2009 DL_{143}	18 February 2009	Maunakea (568)	145	cubewano (hot)	43.6	0.05	11	41.4	45.7	albedo: 0.079	MPC · JPL
2009 DM_{143}	18 February 2009	Maunakea (568)	50	SDO	54.5	0.34	16	35.8	73.2	albedo: 0.124	MPC · JPL
2009 DN_{143}	18 February 2009	Maunakea (568)	86	plutino	39.3	0.20	11	31.6	47.0	albedo: 0.074	MPC · JPL
2009 DO_{143}	18 February 2009	Maunakea (568)	82	cubewano (hot)	44.1	0.11	12	39.1	49.2	albedo: 0.079	MPC · JPL
2009 DP_{143}	18 February 2009	Maunakea (568)	101	cubewano (hot)?	43.7	0.10	16	39.2	48.1	albedo: 0.079	MPC · JPL
2009 DQ_{143}	18 February 2009	Maunakea (568)	93	other TNO	74.8	0.71	12	22.1	127.6	albedo: 0.13	MPC · JPL
2009 DR_{143}	18 February 2009	Maunakea (568)	147	cubewano (hot)	46.9	0.16	10	39.5	54.2	albedo: 0.079	MPC · JPL
2009 DS_{143}	18 February 2009	Maunakea (568)	77	other TNO	49.3	0.24	11	37.2	61.3	albedo: 0.13	MPC · JPL
2009 DT_{143}	22 February 2009	Maunakea (568)	40	other TNO	38.3	0.12	30	33.5	43.0	albedo: 0.13	MPC · JPL
2009 JA_{19}	14 May 2009	Maunakea (568)	165	cubewano (hot)?	43.6	0.02	15	42.9	44.3	albedo: 0.079	MPC · JPL
2009 JB_{19}	14 May 2009	Maunakea (568)	165	cubewano (hot)?	41.8	0.13	23	36.5	47.0	albedo: 0.079	MPC · JPL
2009 JC_{19}	15 May 2009	Maunakea (568)	117	other TNO	50.8	0.32	31	34.5	67.0	albedo: 0.13	MPC · JPL
2009 JD_{19}	15 May 2009	Maunakea (568)	104	other TNO	40.6	0.16	21	34.2	47.0	albedo: 0.13	MPC · JPL
2009 JE_{19}	15 May 2009	Maunakea (568)	224	plutino	39.4	0.30	22	27.6	51.1	albedo: 0.074	MPC · JPL
2009 JF_{19}	15 May 2009	Maunakea (568)	77	other TNO	44.0	0.30	16	30.8	57.2	albedo: 0.13	MPC · JPL
2009 JT_{18}	14 May 2009	Maunakea (568)	70	other TNO	44.0	0.27	19	32.2	55.8	albedo: 0.13	MPC · JPL
2009 JU_{18}	14 May 2009	Maunakea (568)	75	SDO	56.4	0.32	27	38.3	74.5	albedo: 0.124	MPC · JPL
2009 JV_{18}	14 May 2009	Maunakea (568)	103	cubewano (hot)	45.0	0.15	14	38.2	51.8	albedo: 0.079	MPC · JPL
2009 JW_{18}	14 May 2009	Maunakea (568)	94	cubewano (hot)?	46.1	0.11	18	41.0	51.1	albedo: 0.079	MPC · JPL
2009 JX_{18}	14 May 2009	Maunakea (568)	61	centaur	51.6	0.65	21	18.0	85.3	albedo: 0.058	MPC · JPL
2009 JY_{18}	14 May 2009	Maunakea (568)	72	SDO	54.3	0.45	22	30.1	78.6	albedo: 0.124	MPC · JPL
2009 KA_{37}	27 May 2009	Maunakea (568)	72	SDO	54.8	0.39	15	33.4	76.1	albedo: 0.124	MPC · JPL
2009 KJ_{30}	25 May 2009	Maunakea (568)	103	cubewano (hot)?	46.6	0.19	31	37.8	55.4	albedo: 0.079	MPC · JPL
2009 KK_{30}	25 May 2009	M. Yagi (568)	143	SDO	59.9	0.37	14	37.5	82.2	albedo: 0.124	MPC · JPL
2009 KL_{30}	25 May 2009	M. Yagi (568)	150	cubewano (hot)?	45.6	0.20	23	36.3	54.8	albedo: 0.079	MPC · JPL
2009 KM_{30}	25 May 2009	M. Yagi (568)	54	cubewano (cold)?	41.7	0.18	4	34.4	49.0	albedo: 0.152	MPC · JPL
2009 KN_{30}	25 May 2009	M. Yagi (568)	98	res · 2:7	68.9	0.56	5	30.4	107.4	albedo: 0.126	MPC · JPL
2009 KO_{30}	25 May 2009	M. Yagi (568)	90	cubewano (hot)	44.1	0.07	9	40.8	47.4	albedo: 0.079	MPC · JPL
2009 KT_{36}	20 May 2009	Maunakea (568)	106	other TNO	61.7	0.10	90	55.3	68.1	albedo: 0.13	MPC · JPL
2009 KU_{36}	20 May 2009	Maunakea (568)	68	cubewano (hot)?	43.0	0.16	20	35.9	50.1	albedo: 0.079	MPC · JPL
2009 KV_{36}	25 May 2009	Maunakea (568)	106	cubewano (hot)?	42.9	0.10	16	38.5	47.3	albedo: 0.079	MPC · JPL
2009 KW_{36}	27 May 2009	Maunakea (568)	90	cubewano (hot)?	41.3	0.01	28	40.9	41.7	albedo: 0.079	MPC · JPL
2009 KX_{36}	27 May 2009	Maunakea (568)	103	SDO	90.5	0.58	19	38.4	142.6	albedo: 0.124	MPC · JPL
2009 KY_{36}	27 May 2009	Maunakea (568)	84	centaur	42.0	0.09	25	38.1	45.9	albedo: 0.058	MPC · JPL
2009 KZ_{36}	27 May 2009	Maunakea (568)	32	other TNO	35.5	0.26	17	26.1	44.8	albedo: 0.13	MPC · JPL
2009 MA_{10}	21 June 2009	S. S. Sheppard, C. A. Trujillo (568)	55	centaur	33.5	0.33	3	22.6	44.4	albedo: 0.058	MPC · JPL
2009 MF_{10}	27 June 2009	S. S. Sheppard, A. Udalski, C. A. Trujillo, K. Ulaczyk (807)	213	cubewano (hot)?	41.5	0.14	27	35.7	47.3	albedo: 0.079	MPC · JPL
2009 MG_{10}	27 June 2009	C. A. Trujillo, A. Udalski, S. S. Sheppard, I. Soszynski (807)	149	twotino	47.7	0.35	20	31.0	64.3	albedo: 0.126	MPC · JPL
2009 UF_{156}	18 October 2009	Maunakea (568)	171	cubewano (cold)	43.1	0.02	1	42.0	44.1	albedo: 0.152	MPC · JPL
2009 WX_{199}	26 November 2009	Mt. Lemmon Survey (G96)	1.1	damocloid	31.3	0.96	9	1.4	61.2	albedo: 0.048	MPC · JPL
2009 XM_{26}	8 December 2009	Pan-STARRS 1 (F51)	147	centaur	43.8	0.42	22	25.3	62.3	albedo: 0.058	MPC · JPL

back to top
