= List of unnumbered trans-Neptunian objects =

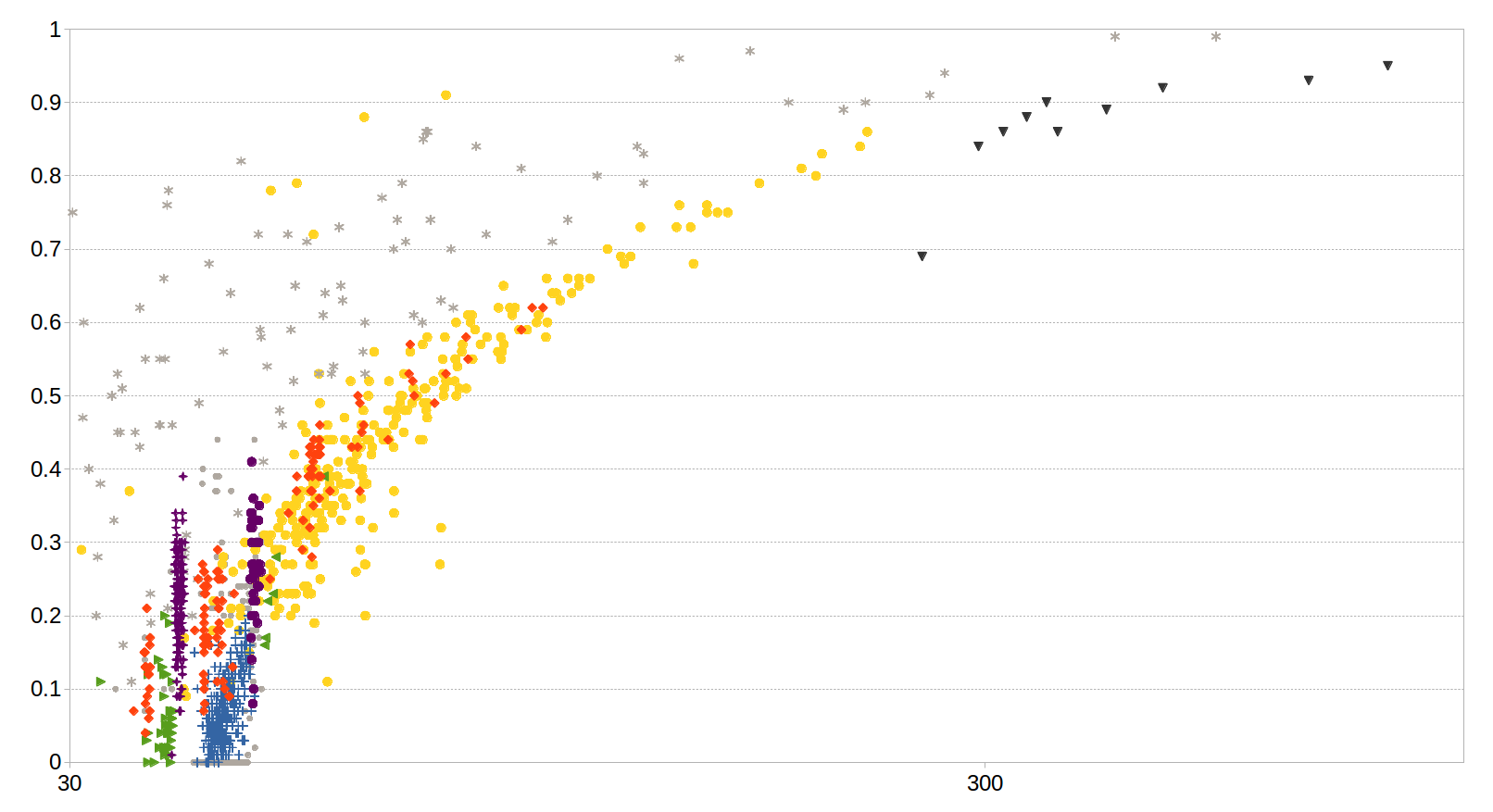
- TNOs: a vs. e (semi-log plot, 30–1000 AU)
- Resonant plutinos (39 AU) and twotinos (48 AU) Inner and outer classical objects (< 39 and > 49 AU) Other resonant objects besides plutinos and twotinos Classical Kuiper belt objects (cubewanos) Scattered disc objects (SDO) Other TNOs (dots) and centaurs (asterisk) Sednoids, prominent ETNOs
- Distribution of 5,630 listed TNO objects (with a > 30.1 AU) by subclass from Johnston's Archive (hover)

This is a list of unnumbered trans-Neptunian objects (TNOs) first observed since 1993 and grouped by the year of principal provisional designation. The data is sourced from the Minor Planet Center's (MPC) Lists and Plots: Minor Planets, and Database Search. These objects will eventually be numbered as secured discoveries with an official discoverer determined by the MPC. Until then, additional observations are needed to sufficiently decrease an object's orbital uncertainty. As of November 2026, there are 7,258 unnumbered objects, defined here as minor planets with a semi-major axis larger than 30.1 AU (Neptune's average orbital distance from the Sun).

The list also contains information from "Johnston's Archive", such as an object's diameter, its dynamical class and binary status with the satellite's diameter, as well as its albedo, spectral taxonomy and B–R color index. Members of the extreme trans-Neptunian objects (ESDOs, EDDOs and sednoids) – with a semi-major axis greater than 150 AU and perihelion greater than 30 AU – are also identified.

== Statistics ==
TNOs by year of principle designation since 1992 (objects with a < 30.1 AU excluded). As of October 2026, there are 7,258 unnumbered TNOs and 1,049 numbered TNOs (Pluto from 1930 is not shown)

- Numbered TNOs: 1,049 obj. (12.6%)
- Unnumbered TNOs: 7,258 obj. (87.4%)
Split-up of numbered and unnumbered trans-Neptunian objects

== List ==
=== 1993 ===
Designation	First Observed (discovered)		D (km)	Orbital description						Remarks	Refs
Designation	Date	Observer (Site)	D (km)	Class	a (AU)	e	i (°)	q (AU)	Q (AU)	Remarks	Refs
1993 RP	15 September 1993	D. C. Jewitt, J. X. Luu (568)	50	res · 4:5	35.2	0.06	4	33.0	37.4	albedo: 0.126	MPC; JPL

back to top

=== 1994 ===
Designation	First Observed (discovered)		D (km)	Orbital description						Remarks	Refs
Designation	Date	Observer (Site)	D (km)	Class	a (AU)	e	i (°)	q (AU)	Q (AU)	Remarks	Refs
1994 ES_{2}	13 March 1994	J. X. Luu, D. C. Jewitt (568)	83	cubewano (cold)	45.8	0.11	1	40.6	51.0	albedo: 0.152; BRmag: 1.65	MPC; JPL
1994 TG	3 October 1994	Maunakea (568)	188	cubewano (hot)	42.3	0.00	7	42.3	42.3	albedo: 0.079	MPC; JPL
1994 TG_{2}	8 October 1994	European Southern Observatory, La Silla (809)	136	cubewano (cold)?	42.4	0.00	2	42.4	42.4	albedo: 0.152	MPC; JPL
1994 TH	3 October 1994	Maunakea (568)	147	other TNO	40.9	0.00	16	40.9	40.9	albedo: 0.13	MPC; JPL

back to top

=== 1995 ===
Designation	First Observed (discovered)		D (km)	Orbital description						Remarks	Refs
Designation	Date	Observer (Site)	D (km)	Class	a (AU)	e	i (°)	q (AU)	Q (AU)	Remarks	Refs
1995 DB_{2}	24 February 1995	D. C. Jewitt, J. X. Luu (568)	96	cubewano (cold)	46.6	0.14	4	40.1	53.1	albedo: 0.152	MPC; JPL
1995 FB_{21}	29 March 1995	Siding Spring Observatory (413)	108	cubewano (cold)?	42.4	0.00	1	42.4	42.4	albedo: 0.152	MPC; JPL
1995 GA_{7}	3 April 1995	Maunakea (568)	154	plutino?	39.5	0.12	4	34.8	44.2	albedo: 0.074	MPC; JPL
1995 GJ	3 April 1995	Maunakea (568)	188	cubewano (hot)?	42.9	0.09	23	39.0	46.8	albedo: 0.079	MPC; JPL
1995 GY_{7}	6 April 1995	European Southern Observatory, La Silla (809)	108	cubewano (cold)?	41.3	0.00	1	41.3	41.3	albedo: 0.152	MPC; JPL
1995 KJ_{1}	30 May 1995	Maunakea (568)	171	cubewano (cold)?	43.5	0.00	3	43.5	43.5	albedo: 0.152	MPC; JPL
1995 KK_{1}	30 May 1995	Maunakea (568)	74	other TNO	39.5	0.19	9	32.0	47.0	albedo: 0.13	MPC; JPL
1995 YY_{3}	24 December 1995	Maunakea (568)	74	other TNO	39.6	0.22	0	30.8	48.4	albedo: 0.13	MPC; JPL

back to top

=== 1996 ===
Designation	First Observed (discovered)		D (km)	Orbital description						Remarks	Refs
Designation	Date	Observer (Site)	D (km)	Class	a (AU)	e	i (°)	q (AU)	Q (AU)	Remarks	Refs
1996 KV_{1}	21 May 1996	C. A. Trujillo, D. C. Jewitt, J. X. Luu (568)	164	cubewano (hot)	45.0	0.11	8	40.2	49.8	albedo: 0.079	MPC; JPL
1996 KX_{1}	22 May 1996	Maunakea (568)	97	plutino?	39.5	0.10	2	35.7	43.4	albedo: 0.074	MPC; JPL
1996 KY_{1}	16 May 1996	Maunakea (568)	123	plutino?	39.5	0.10	31	35.7	43.3	albedo: 0.074	MPC; JPL
1996 PW	9 August 1996	NEAT (566)	10	damocloid	269.1	0.99	30	2.6	535.6	albedo: 0.048	MPC; JPL
1996 RQ_{20}	6 September 1996	D. L. Rabinowitz (675)	185	cubewano (hot)	44.1	0.10	32	39.6	48.6	albedo: 0.079; BRmag: 1.57; taxonomy: IR	MPC; JPL

back to top

=== 1997 ===
Designation	First Observed (discovered)		D (km)	Orbital description						Remarks	Refs
Designation	Date	Observer (Site)	D (km)	Class	a (AU)	e	i (°)	q (AU)	Q (AU)	Remarks	Refs
1997 CW_{29}	8 February 1997	Maunakea (568)	245	plutino?	39.4	0.08	19	36.3	42.5	albedo: 0.074	MPC; JPL
1997 GA_{45}	3 April 1997	B. Gladman (568)	90	cubewano (hot)?	47.2	0.18	8	38.8	55.5	albedo: 0.079	MPC; JPL
1997 QH_{4}	27 August 1997	D. C. Jewitt, C. A. Trujillo, J. X. Luu, K. Berney (568)	188	cubewano (hot)	42.9	0.09	13	39.1	46.6	albedo: 0.079; BRmag: 1.94; taxonomy: RR	MPC; JPL
1997 RL_{13}	5 September 1997	Palomar Mountain (675)	60	cubewano (hot)?	44.5	0.00	6	44.5	44.5	albedo: 0.079	MPC; JPL
1997 RX_{9}	7 September 1997	B. Gladman (675)	103	cubewano (hot)	41.8	0.06	30	39.3	44.3	albedo: 0.079	MPC; JPL
1997 RY_{6}	6 September 1997	La Palma (950)	150	cubewano (hot)	41.4	0.00	12	41.4	41.4	albedo: 0.079	MPC; JPL
1997 TX_{8}	5 October 1997	Palomar Mountain (675)	94	cubewano (hot)?	39.3	0.19	9	32.0	46.6	albedo: 0.079	MPC; JPL
1997 UG_{25}	26 October 1997	La Palma (950)	68	cubewano (cold)?	43.3	0.00	1	43.3	43.3	albedo: 0.152	MPC; JPL

back to top

=== 1998 ===
Designation	First Observed (discovered)		D (km)	Orbital description						Remarks	Refs
Designation	Date	Observer (Site)	D (km)	Class	a (AU)	e	i (°)	q (AU)	Q (AU)	Remarks	Refs
1998 FS_{144}	23 March 1998	Northfield Mount Hermon School (807)	213	cubewano (hot)	41.8	0.02	10	40.8	42.8	albedo: 0.079; BRmag: 1.53; taxonomy: IR	MPC; JPL
1998 HL_{151}	29 April 1998	D. C. Jewitt, J. X. Luu, C. A. Trujillo, D. J. Tholen (568)	88	other TNO	40.7	0.09	28	36.9	44.4	albedo: 0.13; BRmag: 1.06	MPC; JPL
1998 HN_{151}	21 April 1998	J. Kormendy, R. Wainscoat, D. J. Tholen, D. C. Jewitt (568)	83	other TNO	37.9	0.05	25	36.0	39.9	albedo: 0.13	MPC; JPL
1998 HO_{151}	22 April 1998	R. Wainscoat, J. Kormendy, D. C. Jewitt, J. X. Luu (568)	108	cubewano (hot)	41.3	0.09	17	37.5	45.1	albedo: 0.079	MPC; JPL
1998 HR_{151}	28 April 1998	Maunakea (568)	90	cubewano (hot)?	45.5	0.12	7	39.9	51.1	albedo: 0.079	MPC; JPL
1998 KD_{66}	29 May 1998	Cerro Tololo Observatory, La Serena (807)	78	cubewano (hot)?	43.1	0.05	5	40.9	45.3	albedo: 0.079	MPC; JPL
1998 KE_{66}	29 May 1998	Cerro Tololo Observatory, La Serena (807)	54	cubewano (cold)?	42.1	0.00	3	42.1	42.1	albedo: 0.152	MPC; JPL
1998 KF_{66}	29 May 1998	Cerro Tololo Observatory, La Serena (807)	54	plutino?	39.5	0.21	6	31.1	47.9	albedo: 0.074	MPC; JPL
1998 KG_{66}	29 May 1998	Cerro Tololo Observatory, La Serena (807)	57	cubewano (cold)?	45.2	0.00	4	45.2	45.2	albedo: 0.152	MPC; JPL
1998 KS_{65}	29 May 1998	G. Bernstein (807)	101	cubewano (cold)	43.7	0.03	1	42.3	45.1	albedo: 0.152; BRmag: 1.73; taxonomy: RR-IR	MPC; JPL
1998 KY_{61}	29 May 1998	G. Bernstein (807)	119	cubewano (cold)	44.3	0.05	2	42.1	46.4	albedo: 0.152	MPC; JPL
1998 UR_{43}	22 October 1998	M. W. Buie (695)	106	plutino	39.8	0.23	9	30.8	48.8	albedo: 0.074; BRmag: 1.27; taxonomy: BR	MPC; JPL
1998 WS_{31}	18 November 1998	M. W. Buie (695)	107	plutino	39.7	0.21	7	31.5	47.8	albedo: 0.074; BRmag: 1.32; taxonomy: IR-BR	MPC; JPL
1998 WV_{24}	18 November 1998	M. W. Buie (695)	162	plutino?	39.2	0.04	2	37.8	40.6	binary: 106 km; albedo: 0.074; BRmag: 1.27; taxonomy: BR	MPC; JPL
1998 WV_{31}	19 November 1998	M. W. Buie (695)	118	plutino	39.5	0.27	6	28.8	50.1	albedo: 0.074; BRmag: 1.34; taxonomy: BR	MPC; JPL
1998 WW31	18 November 1998	M. W. Buie (695)	145	cubewano (hot)	44.9	0.08	7	41.3	48.5	binary: 121 km; albedo: 0.16	MPC; JPL
1998 WX_{24}	18 November 1998	M. W. Buie (695)	156	cubewano (cold)	43.6	0.04	1	42.0	45.2	albedo: 0.152; BRmag: 1.79; taxonomy: RR	MPC; JPL
1998 WY_{31}	18 November 1998	M. W. Buie (695)	137	cubewano (cold)	45.5	0.12	2	40.0	51.1	albedo: 0.152	MPC; JPL
1998 WZ_{24}	18 November 1998	Kitt Peak (695)	88	other TNO	39.5	0.18	5	32.4	46.6	albedo: 0.13	MPC; JPL
1998 WZ_{31}	19 November 1998	M. W. Buie (695)	111	plutino	39.8	0.17	15	33.0	46.6	albedo: 0.074; BRmag: 1.26; taxonomy: IR-BR	MPC; JPL

back to top

=== 1999–2007 ===
- List of unnumbered trans-Neptunian objects: 1999
- List of unnumbered trans-Neptunian objects: 2000
- List of unnumbered trans-Neptunian objects: 2001
- List of unnumbered trans-Neptunian objects: 2002
- List of unnumbered trans-Neptunian objects: 2003
- List of unnumbered trans-Neptunian objects: 2004
- List of unnumbered trans-Neptunian objects: 2005
- List of unnumbered trans-Neptunian objects: 2006
- List of unnumbered trans-Neptunian objects: 2007
back to top

=== 2008 ===
Designation	First Observed (discovered)		D (km)	Orbital description						Remarks	Refs
Designation	Date	Observer (Site)	D (km)	Class	a (AU)	e	i (°)	q (AU)	Q (AU)	Remarks	Refs
2008 AP_{118}	6 January 2008	P. A. Wiegert (568)	121	res · 4:7	44.0	0.16	1	37.0	50.9	albedo: 0.126	MPC; JPL
2008 AU_{138}	8 January 2008	Maunakea (568)	256	centaur	32.5	0.37	43	20.5	44.5	albedo: 0.058	MPC; JPL
2008 BN_{18}	30 January 2008	Spacewatch (291)	11	damocloid	31.5	0.92	29	2.6	60.5	albedo: 0.048	MPC; JPL
2008 JO_{41}	11 May 2008	Maunakea (568)	79	SDO	86.7	0.54	49	39.9	133.6	albedo: 0.124	MPC; JPL
2008 LD_{18}	7 June 2008	S. S. Sheppard, C. A. Trujillo (568)	81	other TNO	39.8	0.30	15	27.8	51.8	albedo: 0.13	MPC; JPL
2008 QQ_{53}	27 August 2008	Maunakea (568)	—	—	46.1	0.18	8	37.8	54.3	—	MPC; JPL
2008 TA_{239}	7 October 2008	D. J. Tholen (T14)	144	plutino	39.7	0.10	32	35.7	43.7	albedo: 0.074	MPC; JPL
2008 UA_{332}	26 October 2008	L. H. Wasserman (807)	220	res · 1:4	76.1	0.51	31	37.1	115.2	albedo: 0.126; taxonomy: BR	MPC; JPL

back to top

=== 2009–2023 ===
- List of unnumbered trans-Neptunian objects: 2009
- List of unnumbered trans-Neptunian objects: 2010
- List of unnumbered trans-Neptunian objects: 2011
- List of unnumbered trans-Neptunian objects: 2012
- List of unnumbered trans-Neptunian objects: 2013
- List of unnumbered trans-Neptunian objects: 2014
- List of unnumbered trans-Neptunian objects: 2015
- List of unnumbered trans-Neptunian objects: 2016
- List of unnumbered trans-Neptunian objects: 2017
- List of unnumbered trans-Neptunian objects: 2018
- List of unnumbered trans-Neptunian objects: 2019
- List of unnumbered trans-Neptunian objects: 2020
- List of unnumbered trans-Neptunian objects: 2021
- List of unnumbered trans-Neptunian objects: 2022
- List of unnumbered trans-Neptunian objects: 2023
back to top

=== 2024 ===
Designation	First Observed (discovered)		D (km)	Orbital description						Remarks	Refs
Designation	Date	Observer (Site)	D (km)	Class	a (AU)	e	i (°)	q (AU)	Q (AU)	Remarks	Refs
2024 AW_{15}	10 January 2024	WFST, Lenghu (O18)	164	plutino	39.7	0.30	4	27.9	51.5	albedo: 0.074	MPC; JPL
2024 CC_{30}	7 February 2024	Cerro Tololo-DECam (W84)	152	other TNO	58.4	0.10	84	52.6	64.2	albedo: 0.13	MPC; JPL
2024 CE_{30}	7 February 2024	Cerro Tololo-DECam (W84)	150	other TNO	37.4	0.10	26	33.8	41.0	albedo: 0.13	MPC; JPL
2024 DJ_{4}	18 February 2024	Pan-STARRS 1 (F51)	4	unusual	38.9	0.92	25	3.2	74.6	albedo: 0.051	MPC; JPL
2024 EL_{7}	4 March 2024	Korea Microlensing Telescope Network-CTIO (W93)	160	cubewano (cold)?	43.1	0.10	1	38.8	47.5	albedo: 0.152	MPC; JPL
2024 FA_{27}	—	—	209	centaur	74.8	0.75	8	18.7	130.8	albedo: 0.058	MPC; JPL
2024 FB_{27}	16 March 2024	Cerro Tololo-DECam (W84)	201	other TNO	43.1	0.03	2	42.0	44.1	albedo: 0.13	MPC; JPL
2024 FV_{24}	19 March 2024	Pan-STARRS 1 (F51)	10	centaur	62.0	0.89	31	6.6	117.3	albedo: 0.058	MPC; JPL
2024 FX_{26}	16 March 2024	Cerro Tololo-DECam (W84)	152	SDO	253.8	0.84	16	40.9	466.7	albedo: 0.124	MPC; JPL
2024 FY_{26}	16 March 2024	Cerro Tololo-DECam (W84)	107	SDO	80.9	0.59	6	32.9	128.9	albedo: 0.124	MPC; JPL
2024 FZ_{26}	16 March 2024	Cerro Tololo-DECam (W84)	217	twotino	48.1	0.28	8	34.6	61.6	albedo: 0.126	MPC; JPL
2024 GF_{30}	3 April 2024	Cerro Tololo-DECam (W84)	214	other TNO	41.6	0.17	37	34.7	48.6	albedo: 0.13	MPC; JPL
2024 GG_{30}	3 April 2024	Cerro Tololo-DECam (W84)	163	centaur	47.1	0.41	31	27.8	66.5	albedo: 0.058	MPC; JPL
2024 GT_{4}	4 April 2024	ATLAS South Africa, Sutherland (M22)	146	centaur	33.5	0.54	35	15.4	51.6	albedo: 0.058	MPC; JPL
2024 JD_{27}	2 May 2024	Pan-STARRS 1 (F51)	3	damocloid	41.4	0.93	58	3.1	79.7	albedo: 0.048	MPC; JPL
2024 LY_{9}	15 June 2024	Pan-STARRS 2 (F52)	35	centaur	60.2	0.84	146	9.7	110.7	albedo: 0.058	MPC; JPL
2024 OR_{4}	30 July 2024	Purple Mountain Observatory, XuYi Station (D29)	107	centaur	35.7	0.52	19	17.2	54.3	albedo: 0.058	MPC; JPL
2024 PL_{17}	15 August 2024	Pan-STARRS 1 (F51)	37	centaur	87.6	0.93	142	6.6	168.6	albedo: 0.058	MPC; JPL
2024 PP_{38}	3 August 2024	Pan-STARRS 1 (F51)	44	centaur	186.3	0.97	153	6.3	366.3	albedo: 0.058	MPC; JPL
2024 PP_{8}	15 August 2024	Calar Alto-Schmidt (Z84)	4	damocloid	92.0	0.97	136	2.9	181.0	albedo: 0.048	MPC; JPL
2024 QX_{1}	27 August 2024	Pan-STARRS 1 (F51)	4	damocloid	258.7	0.99	144	3.1	514.3	albedo: 0.048	MPC; JPL
2024 RA_{22}	11 September 2024	Pan-STARRS 2 (F52)	96	centaur	53.4	0.64	26	19.4	87.4	albedo: 0.058	MPC; JPL
2024 RQ_{11}	1 September 2024	Pan-STARRS 2 (F52)	2.3	damocloid	57.9	0.95	133	2.7	113.2	albedo: 0.048	MPC; JPL
2024 TF_{3}	3 October 2024	Pan-STARRS 2 (F52)	42	centaur	47.9	0.77	89	10.9	84.8	albedo: 0.058	MPC; JPL
2024 WJ_{112}	—	—	—	—	36.9	0.1	52	33.1	40.7	—	MPC; JPL
2024 WK_{112}	—	—	—	—	39.3	0.11	10	35.1	43.6	—	MPC; JPL
2024 XN_{25}	8 December 2024	Pan-STARRS 2 (F52)	2.7	damocloid	55.1	0.95	98	2.7	107.6	albedo: 0.048	MPC; JPL
2024 XR_{49}	2 December 2024	Subaru Telescope, Maunakea (T09)	139	other TNO	48.2	0.24	19	36.4	59.9	albedo: 0.13	MPC; JPL
2024 XS_{15}	2 December 2024	Kitt Peak-Bok (V00)	4	centaur	47.6	0.89	29	5.3	89.9	albedo: 0.058	MPC; JPL
2024 XS_{49}	3 December 2024	Subaru Telescope, Maunakea (T09)	251	SDO	69.3	0.49	19	35.2	103.3	albedo: 0.124	MPC; JPL
2024 XT_{49}	3 December 2024	Subaru Telescope, Maunakea (T09)	121	other TNO	47.9	0.29	9	34.2	61.6	albedo: 0.13	MPC; JPL
2024 XW_{49}	4 December 2024	Subaru Telescope, Maunakea (T09)	92	other TNO	45.9	0.18	10	37.5	54.4	binary: 72 km albedo: 0.13	MPC; JPL
2024 XW_{52}	—	—	—	—	42.2	0.10	13	38.1	46.2	—	MPC; JPL
2024 XX_{49}	2 December 2024	Subaru Telescope, Maunakea (T09)	195	centaur	39.9	0.25	12	30.0	49.9	albedo: 0.058	MPC; JPL

back to top

=== 2025–2026 ===
- List of unnumbered trans-Neptunian objects: 2025
- List of unnumbered trans-Neptunian objects: 2026
back to top

== See also ==
- List of unnumbered minor planets
- List of the brightest Kuiper belt objects
- List of Solar System objects by greatest aphelion
- List of Solar System objects most distant from the Sun
