= 2012 GX17 =

Centaur

2012 GX_{17}
Discovery
- Discovered by: Pan-STARRS 1
- Discovery date: 14 April 2012

Designations
- Minor planet category: TNO; Centaur

Orbital characteristics
- Epoch 31 May 2020 (JD 2459000.5)
- Uncertainty parameter 1
- Observation arc: 2930 days (8.02 yr)
- Aphelion: 57.826 AU (8.6506 Tm)
- Perihelion: 16.9434206 AU (2.53469964 Tm)
- Semi-major axis: 37.3849220 AU (5.59270473 Tm)
- Eccentricity: 0.5467846
- Orbital period (sidereal): 228.59 yr (83491.6 d)
- Mean anomaly: 49.28874°
- Mean motion: 0° 0^{m} 15.523^{s} / day
- Inclination: 32.53975°
- Longitude of ascending node: 209.23931°
- Argument of perihelion: 243.62742°
- Earth MOID: 16.0869 AU (2.40657 Tm)
- Jupiter MOID: 12.6178 AU (1.88760 Tm)

Physical characteristics
- Dimensions: 60–200 km
- Geometric albedo: 0.5–0.05 (assumed)
- Absolute magnitude (H): 7.6

2012 GX_{17} is a minor body classified as a centaur and trans-Neptunian object by the Minor Planet Center. The object was once considered a promising Neptune L_{5} trojan candidate.

== Discovery ==
2012 GX_{17} was discovered on 14 April 2012 by the Pan-STARRS 1 telescope, observing from Haleakala, Hawaii.

== Orbit ==
2012 GX_{17} follows a rather eccentric orbit (0.55) with a semi-major axis of 37.4 AU. This object also has high orbital inclination (32.5º).

== Physical properties ==
2012 GX_{17} is a rather large minor body with an absolute magnitude of 7.6 which gives a characteristic diameter of 60–200 km for an assumed albedo in the range 0.5–0.05.

== Former Neptune trojan candidate ==
Initially, 2012 GX_{17} was considered to be a promising Neptune trojan candidate, based on a very preliminary determination of 30.13 AU for its semi-major axis. However, the true value is much larger (37.4 AU) and it is now classified as a trans-Neptunian object.
