= Scattered disc =

Collection of bodies in the extreme Solar System

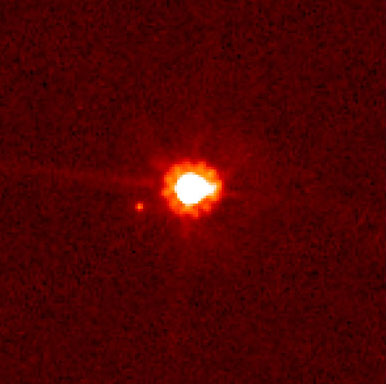
Eris (center), the largest known scattered-disc object, and its moon Dysnomia (left of Eris)

The scattered disc (or scattered disk) is a distant circumstellar disc in the Solar System that is sparsely populated by icy small Solar System bodies, which are a subset of the broader family of trans-Neptunian objects. The scattered-disc objects (SDOs) have orbital eccentricities ranging as high as 0.8, inclinations as high as 40°, and perihelia greater than 30 astronomical units (4.5×10^{9} km; 2.8×10^{9} mi). These extreme orbits are thought to be the result of gravitational "scattering" by the gas giants, and the objects continue to be subject to perturbation by the planet Neptune.

Although the closest scattered-disc objects approach the Sun at about 30–35 AU, their orbits can extend well beyond 100 AU. This makes scattered disc objects among the coldest and most distant known objects in the Solar System. The innermost portion of the scattered disc overlaps with a torus-shaped region of orbiting objects traditionally called the Kuiper belt, but its outer limits reach much farther away from the Sun and farther above and below the ecliptic than the Kuiper belt proper. (Note: The literature is inconsistent in the use of the phrases "scattered disc" and "Kuiper belt". For some, they are distinct populations; for others, the scattered disc is part of the Kuiper belt. Authors may even switch between these two uses in a single publication. In this article, the scattered disc will be considered a separate population from the Kuiper belt.)

Because of its unstable nature, astronomers now consider the scattered disc to be the place of origin for most periodic comets in the Solar System, with the centaurs, a population of icy bodies between Jupiter and Neptune, being the intermediate stage in an object's migration from the disc to the inner Solar System. Eventually, perturbations from the giant planets send such objects towards the Sun, transforming them into periodic comets. Many objects of the proposed Oort cloud are also thought to have originated in the scattered disc. Detached objects are not sharply distinct from scattered disc objects, and some such as Sedna have sometimes been considered to be included in this group.

== Discovery ==
Traditionally, devices like a blink comparator were used in astronomy to detect objects in the Solar System, because these objects would move between two exposures—this involved time-consuming steps like exposing and developing photographic plates or films, and people then using a blink comparator to manually detect prospective objects. During the 1980s, the use of CCD-based cameras in telescopes made it possible to directly produce electronic images that could then be readily digitized and transferred to digital images. Because the CCD captured more light than film (about 90% versus 10% of incoming light) and the blinking could now be done at an adjustable computer screen, the surveys allowed for higher throughput. A flood of new discoveries was the result: over a thousand trans-Neptunian objects were detected between 1992 and 2006.

The first scattered-disc object (SDO) to be recognised as such was 1996 TL_{66}, originally identified in 1996 by astronomers based at Mauna Kea in Hawaii. Three more were identified by the same survey in 1999: 1999 CV_{118}, 1999 CY_{118}, and 1999 CF_{119}. The first object presently classified as an SDO to be discovered was 1995 TL_{8}, found in 1995 by Spacewatch.

As of 2011, over 200 SDOs have been identified, including Gǃkúnǁʼhòmdímà (discovered by Schwamb, Brown, and Rabinowitz), Gonggong (Schwamb, Brown, and Rabinowitz) 2002 TC_{302} (NEAT), Eris (Brown, Trujillo, and Rabinowitz), Sedna (Brown, Trujillo, and Rabinowitz), and 474640 Alicanto (Deep Ecliptic Survey). Although the numbers of objects in the Kuiper belt and the scattered disc are hypothesized to be roughly equal, observational bias due to their greater distance means that far fewer SDOs have been observed to date.

== Subdivisions of trans-Neptunian space ==
The eccentricity and inclination of the scattered-disc population compared to the classical and 5:2 resonant Kuiper-belt objects

Known trans-Neptunian objects are often divided into two subpopulations: the Kuiper belt and the scattered disc. A third reservoir of trans-Neptunian objects, the Oort cloud, has been hypothesized, although no confirmed direct observations of the Oort cloud have been made. Some researchers further suggest a transitional space between the scattered disc and the inner Oort cloud, populated with "detached objects".

=== Scattered disc versus Kuiper belt ===
The Kuiper belt is a relatively thick torus (or "doughnut") of space, extending from about 30 to 50 AU comprising two main populations of Kuiper belt objects (KBOs): the classical Kuiper-belt objects (or "cubewanos"), which lie in orbits untouched by Neptune, and the resonant Kuiper-belt objects, those which Neptune has locked into a precise orbital ratio such as 2:3 (the object goes around twice for every three Neptune orbits) and 1:2 (the object goes around once for every two Neptune orbits). These ratios, called orbital resonances, allow KBOs to persist in regions which Neptune's gravitational influence would otherwise have cleared out over the age of the Solar System, since the objects are never close enough to Neptune to be scattered by its gravity. Those in 2:3 resonances are known as "plutinos", because Pluto is the largest member of their group, whereas those in 1:2 resonances are known as "twotinos".

In contrast to the Kuiper belt, the scattered-disc population can be disturbed by Neptune. Scattered-disc objects come within gravitational range of Neptune at their closest approaches (~30 AU) but their farthest distances reach many times that. Ongoing research suggests that the centaurs, a class of icy minor planets that orbit between Jupiter and Neptune, may simply be SDOs thrown into the inner reaches of the Solar System by Neptune, making them "cis-Neptunian" rather than trans-Neptunian scattered objects. Some objects, like (29981) 1999 TD_{10}, blur the distinction and the Minor Planet Center (MPC), which officially catalogues all trans-Neptunian objects, now lists centaurs and SDOs together.

The MPC, however, makes a clear distinction between the Kuiper belt and the scattered disc, separating those objects in stable orbits (the Kuiper belt) from those in scattered orbits (the scattered disc and the centaurs). However, the difference between the Kuiper belt and the scattered disc is not clear-cut, and many astronomers see the scattered disc not as a separate population but as an outward region of the Kuiper belt. Another term used is "scattered Kuiper-belt object" (or SKBO) for bodies of the scattered disc.

Morbidelli and Brown propose that the difference between objects in the Kuiper belt and scattered-disc objects is that the latter bodies "are transported in semi-major axis by close and distant encounters with Neptune," but the former experienced no such close encounters. This delineation is inadequate (as they note) over the age of the Solar System, since bodies "trapped in resonances" could "pass from a scattering phase to a non-scattering phase (and vice versa) numerous times." That is, trans-Neptunian objects could travel back and forth between the Kuiper belt and the scattered disc over time. Therefore, they chose instead to define the regions, rather than the objects, defining the scattered disc as "the region of orbital space that can be visited by bodies that have encountered Neptune" within the radius of a Hill sphere, and the Kuiper belt as its "complement ... in the a > 30 AU region"; the region of the Solar System populated by objects with semi-major axes greater than 30 AU.

=== Detached objects ===
The Minor Planet Center classifies the trans-Neptunian object 90377 Sedna as a scattered-disc object. Its discoverer Michael E. Brown has suggested instead that it should be considered an inner Oort-cloud object rather than a member of the scattered disc, because, with a perihelion distance of 76 AU, it is too remote to be affected by the gravitational attraction of the outer planets. Under this definition, an object with a perihelion greater than 40 AU could be classified as outside the scattered disc.

Sedna is not the only such object: (148209) 2000 CR105 (discovered before Sedna) and 474640 Alicanto have a perihelion too far away from Neptune to be influenced by it. This led to a discussion among astronomers about a new minor planet set, called the extended scattered disc (E-SDO). 2000 CR_{105} may also be an inner Oort-cloud object or (more likely) a transitional object between the scattered disc and the inner Oort cloud. More recently, these objects have been referred to as "detached", or distant detached objects (DDO).

There are no clear boundaries between the scattered and detached regions. Gomes et al. define SDOs as having "highly eccentric orbits, perihelia beyond Neptune, and semi-major axes beyond the 1:2 resonance." By this definition, all distant detached objects are SDOs. Since detached objects' orbits cannot be produced by Neptune scattering, alternative scattering mechanisms have been put forward, including a passing star or a distant, planet-sized object. Alternatively, it has been suggested that these objects have been captured from a passing star.

A scheme introduced by a 2005 report from the Deep Ecliptic Survey by J. L. Elliott et al. distinguishes between two categories: scattered-near (i.e. typical SDOs) and scattered-extended (i.e. detached objects). Scattered-near objects are those whose orbits are non-resonant, non-planetary-orbit-crossing and have a Tisserand parameter (relative to Neptune) less than 3. Scattered-extended objects have a Tisserand parameter (relative to Neptune) greater than 3 and have a time-averaged eccentricity greater than 0.2.

An alternative classification, introduced by B. J. Gladman, B. G. Marsden and C. Van Laerhoven in 2007, uses 10-million-year orbit integration instead of the Tisserand parameter. An object qualifies as an SDO if its orbit is not resonant, has a semi-major axis no greater than 2000 AU, and, during the integration, its semi-major axis shows an excursion of 1.5 AU or more. Gladman et al. suggest the term scattering disk object to emphasize this present mobility. If the object is not an SDO as per the above definition, but the eccentricity of its orbit is greater than 0.240, it is classified as a detached TNO. (Objects with smaller eccentricity are considered classical.) In this scheme, the disc extends from the orbit of Neptune to 2000 AU, the region referred to as the inner Oort cloud.

== Orbits ==
Distribution of trans-Neptunian objects, with semi-major axis on the horizontal, and perihelion on the vertical axis. Scattered disc objects occupy the wide horizontal region in grey and purple, while objects that are in resonance with Neptune are in red. Extreme trans-Neptunian objects and sednoids are in pink, brown, and yellow. Finally, the classical Kuiper belt is in blue.

The scattered disc is a very dynamic environment. Because they are still capable of being perturbed by Neptune, SDOs' orbits are always in danger of disruption; either of being sent outward to the Oort cloud or inward into the centaur population and ultimately the Jupiter family of comets. For this reason Gladman et al. prefer to refer to the region as the scattering disc, rather than scattered. Unlike Kuiper-belt objects (KBOs), the orbits of scattered-disc objects can be inclined as much as 40° from the ecliptic.

SDOs are typically characterized by orbits with medium and high eccentricities with a semi-major axis greater than 50 AU, but their perihelia bring them within influence of Neptune. Having a perihelion of roughly 30 AU is one of the defining characteristics of scattered objects, as it allows Neptune to exert its gravitational influence.

The classical objects (cubewanos) are very different from the scattered objects: more than 30% of all cubewanos are on low-inclination, near-circular orbits whose eccentricities peak at 0.25. Classical objects possess eccentricities ranging from 0.2 to 0.8. Though the inclinations of scattered objects are similar to the more extreme KBOs, very few scattered objects have orbits as close to the ecliptic as much of the KBO population.

Although motions in the scattered disc are random, they do tend to follow similar directions, which means that SDOs can become trapped in temporary resonances with Neptune. Examples of possible resonant orbits within the scattered disc include 1:3, 2:7, 3:11, 5:22 and 4:79.

== Formation ==
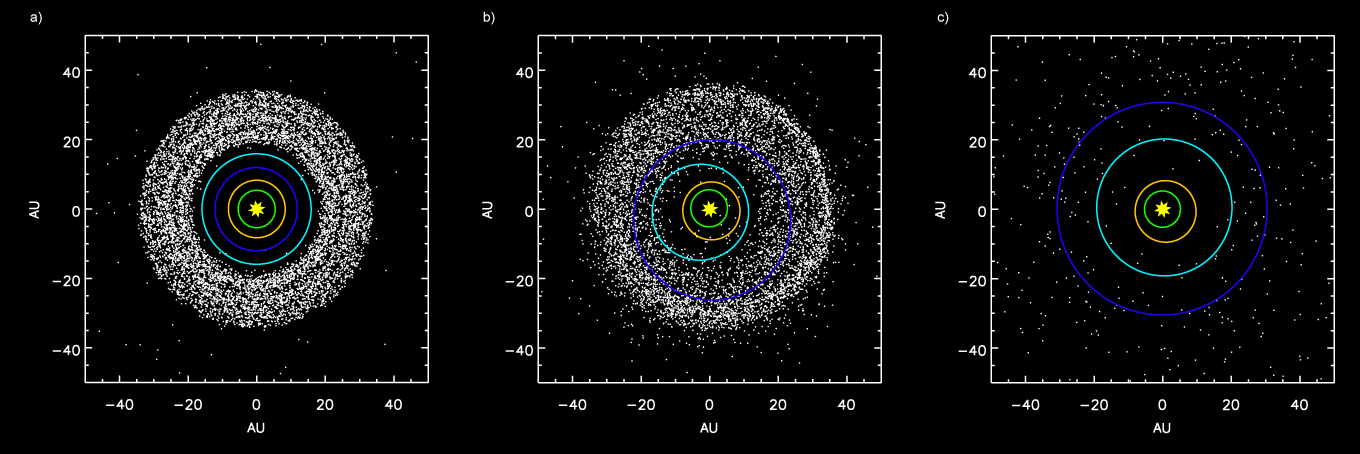
Simulation showing Outer Planets and Kuiper Belt: a) Before Jupiter/Saturn 2:1 resonance b) Scattering of Kuiper belt objects into the Solar System after the orbital shift of Neptune c) After ejection of Kuiper belt bodies by Jupiter

The scattered disc is still poorly understood: no model of the formation of the Kuiper belt and the scattered disc has yet been proposed that explains all their observed properties.

According to contemporary models, the scattered disc formed when Kuiper belt objects (KBOs) were "scattered" into eccentric and inclined orbits by gravitational interaction with Neptune and the other outer planets. The amount of time for this process to occur remains uncertain. One hypothesis estimates a period equal to the entire age of the Solar System; a second posits that the scattering took place relatively quickly, during Neptune's early migration epoch.

Models for a continuous formation throughout the age of the Solar System illustrate that at weak resonances within the Kuiper belt (such as 5:7 or 8:1), or at the boundaries of stronger resonances, objects can develop weak orbital instabilities over millions of years. The 4:7 resonance in particular has large instability. KBOs can also be shifted into unstable orbits by close passage of massive objects, or through collisions. Over time, the scattered disc would gradually form from these isolated events.

Computer simulations have also suggested a more rapid and earlier formation for the scattered disc. Modern theories indicate that neither Uranus nor Neptune could have formed in situ beyond Saturn, as too little primordial matter existed at that range to produce objects of such high mass. Instead, these planets, and Saturn, may have formed closer to Jupiter, but were flung outwards during the early evolution of the Solar System, perhaps through exchanges of angular momentum with scattered objects. Once the orbits of Jupiter and Saturn shifted to a 2:1 resonance (two Jupiter orbits for each orbit of Saturn), their combined gravitational pull disrupted the orbits of Uranus and Neptune, sending Neptune into the temporary "chaos" of the proto-Kuiper belt. As Neptune traveled outward, it scattered many trans-Neptunian objects into higher and more eccentric orbits. This model states that 90% or more of the objects in the scattered disc may have been "promoted into these eccentric orbits by Neptune's resonances during the migration epoch...[therefore] the scattered disc might not be so scattered."

== Composition ==
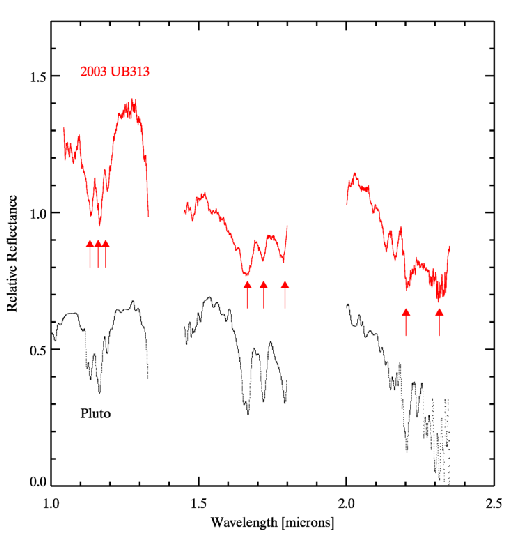
The infrared spectra of both Eris and Pluto, highlighting their common methane absorption lines

Scattered objects, like other trans-Neptunian objects, have low densities and are composed largely of frozen volatiles such as water and methane. Spectral analysis of selected Kuiper belt and scattered objects has revealed signatures of similar compounds. Both Pluto and Eris, for instance, show signatures for methane.

Astronomers originally supposed that the entire trans-Neptunian population would show a similar red surface colour, as they were thought to have originated in the same region and subjected to the same physical processes. Specifically, SDOs were expected to have large amounts of surface methane, chemically altered into tholins by sunlight from the Sun. This would absorb blue light, creating a reddish hue. Most classical objects display this colour, but scattered objects do not; instead, they present a white or greyish appearance.

One explanation is the exposure of whiter subsurface layers by impacts; another is that the scattered objects' greater distance from the Sun creates a composition gradient, analogous to the composition gradient of the terrestrial and gas giant planets. Michael E. Brown, discoverer of the scattered object Eris, suggests that its paler colour could be because, at its current distance from the Sun, its atmosphere of methane is frozen over its entire surface, creating an inches-thick layer of bright white ice. Pluto, conversely, being closer to the Sun, would be warm enough that methane would freeze only onto cooler, high-albedo regions, leaving low-albedo tholin-covered regions bare of ice.

== Comets ==
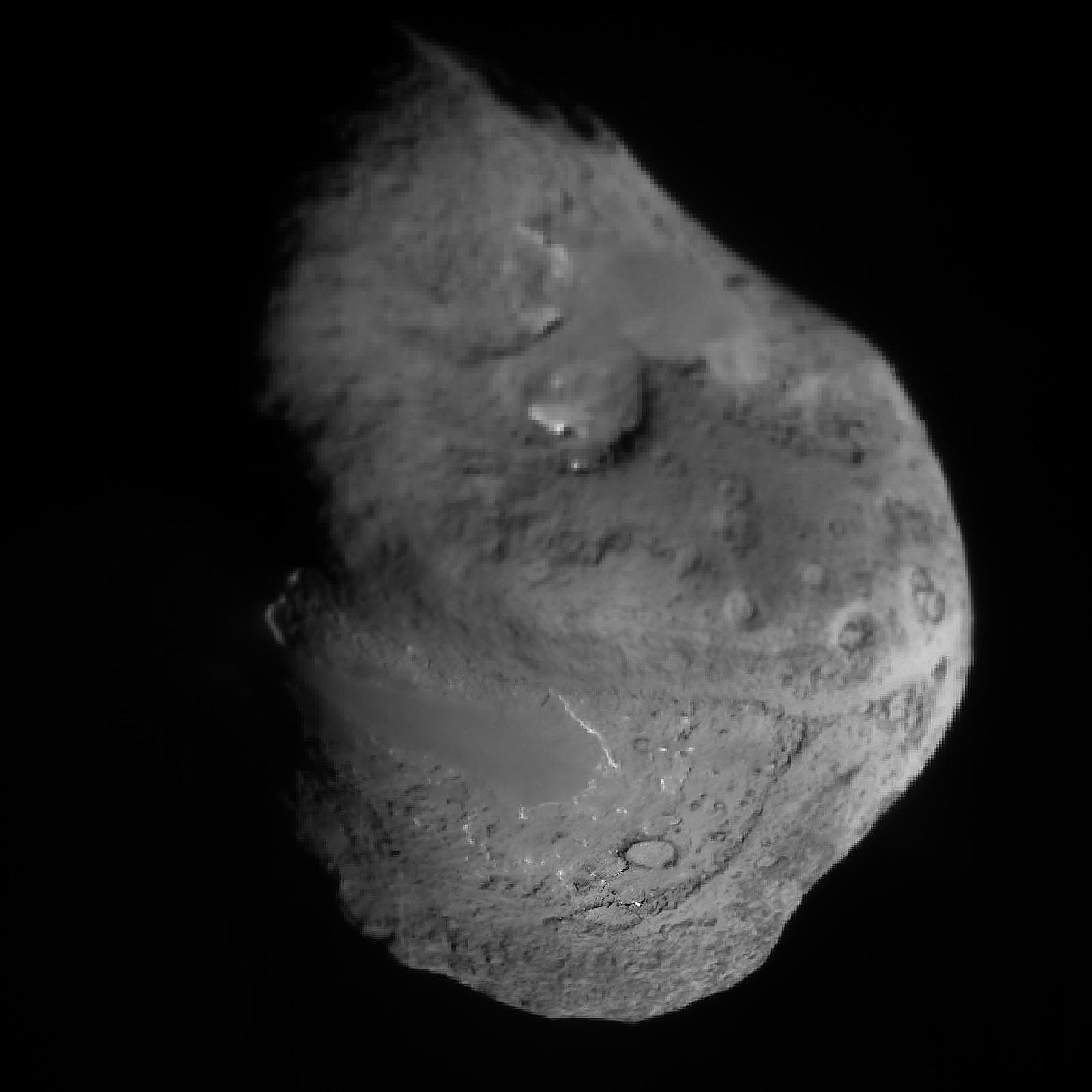
Tempel 1, a Jupiter-family comet

The Kuiper belt was initially thought to be the source of the Solar System's ecliptic comets. However, studies of the region since 1992 have shown that the orbits within the Kuiper belt are relatively stable, and that ecliptic comets originate from the scattered disc, where orbits are generally less stable.

Comets can loosely be divided into two categories: short-period and long-period—the latter being thought to originate in the Oort cloud. The two major categories of short-period comets are Jupiter-family comets (JFCs) and Halley-type comets. Halley-type comets, which are named after their prototype, Halley's Comet, are thought to have originated in the Oort cloud but to have been drawn into the inner Solar System by the gravity of the giant planets, whereas the JFCs are thought to have originated in the scattered disc. The centaurs are thought to be a dynamically intermediate stage between the scattered disc and the Jupiter family.

There are many differences between SDOs and JFCs, even though many of the Jupiter-family comets may have originated in the scattered disc. Although the centaurs share a reddish or neutral coloration with many SDOs, their nuclei are bluer, indicating a fundamental chemical or physical difference. One hypothesis is that comet nuclei are resurfaced as they approach the Sun by subsurface materials which subsequently bury the older material.

== See also ==
- List of possible dwarf planets
- List of trans-Neptunian objects
