= List of unnumbered trans-Neptunian objects: 2019 =

The following is a partial list of unnumbered trans-Neptunian objects for principal designations assigned within 2019. As of November 2026, it contains a total of 294 bodies. For more information see the description on the main page. Also see list for the previous and next year.

== 2019 ==
Designation	First Observed (discovered)		D (km)	Orbital description						Remarks	Refs
Designation	Date	Observer (Site)	D (km)	Class	a (AU)	e	i (°)	q (AU)	Q (AU)	Remarks	Refs
2019 AC_{77}	11 January 2019	Cerro Tololo Observatory, La Serena (807)	181	SDO	57.7	0.38	12	35.9	79.5	albedo: 0.124	MPC; JPL
2019 AE_{156}	—	—	—	—	86.3	0.56	24	38.0	134.6	—	MPC; JPL
2019 AG_{142}	11 January 2019	COIAS,Subaru Telescope (T09)	92	cubewano (hot)?	47.2	0.24	8	35.8	58.6	albedo: 0.079	MPC; JPL
2019 AJ_{142}	11 January 2019	COIAS,Subaru Telescope (T09)	71	res · 3:5	42.2	0.25	6	31.8	52.6	albedo: 0.126	MPC; JPL
2019 AK_{142}	11 January 2019	COIAS,Subaru Telescope (T09)	79	SDO	61.2	0.41	18	36.0	86.3	albedo: 0.124	MPC; JPL
2019 AL_{142}	11 January 2019	COIAS,Subaru Telescope (T09)	144	other TNO	46.6	0.19	11	37.7	55.6	albedo: 0.13	MPC; JPL
2019 AM_{142}	11 January 2019	COIAS,Subaru Telescope (T09)	68	SDO	72.8	0.56	10	32.2	113.4	albedo: 0.124	MPC; JPL
2019 AN_{142}	11 January 2019	COIAS,Subaru Telescope (T09)	86	SDO	95.6	0.60	15	38.2	153.1	albedo: 0.124	MPC; JPL
2019 AO_{142}	11 January 2019	COIAS,Subaru Telescope (T09)	90	SDO	141.5	0.72	25	39.2	243.7	albedo: 0.124	MPC; JPL
2019 AQ_{142}	6 January 2019	COIAS,Subaru Telescope (T09)	72	other TNO	33.5	0.10	15	30.3	36.8	albedo: 0.13	MPC; JPL
2019 AR_{143}	6 January 2019	COIAS,Subaru Telescope (T09)	128	other TNO	52.4	0.26	31	38.7	66.2	albedo: 0.13	MPC; JPL
2019 AS_{142}	6 January 2019	COIAS,Subaru Telescope (T09)	75	SDO	62.3	0.36	34	39.6	84.9	albedo: 0.124	MPC; JPL
2019 AT_{142}	6 January 2019	COIAS,Subaru Telescope (T09)	81	res · 3:4	36.6	0.19	18	29.7	43.4	albedo: 0.126	MPC; JPL
2019 AU_{138}	6 January 2019	COIAS,Subaru Telescope (T09)	99	other TNO	31.2	0.02	18	30.6	31.9	albedo: 0.13	MPC; JPL
2019 AZ_{156}	—	—	—	—	39.0	0.14	31	33.4	44.5	—	MPC; JPL
2019 CB_{31}	5 February 2019	COIAS,Subaru Telescope (T09)	113	cubewano (hot)?	42.9	0.07	6	39.7	46.0	albedo: 0.079	MPC; JPL
2019 CC_{30}	5 February 2019	COIAS,Subaru Telescope (T09)	102	cubewano (cold)?	43.8	0.04	4	42.2	45.3	albedo: 0.152	MPC; JPL
2019 CC_{31}	5 February 2019	COIAS,Subaru Telescope (T09)	141	other TNO	49.9	0.28	17	36.1	63.8	albedo: 0.13	MPC; JPL
2019 CC_{32}	4 February 2019	COIAS,Subaru Telescope (T09)	64	plutino?	39.8	0.11	14	35.6	44.0	albedo: 0.074	MPC; JPL
2019 CD_{30}	4 February 2019	COIAS,Subaru Telescope (T09)	100	cubewano (hot)?	41.5	0.02	17	40.5	42.5	albedo: 0.079	MPC; JPL
2019 CE_{30}	5 February 2019	COIAS,Subaru Telescope (T09)	87	cubewano (cold)?	43.0	0.04	4	41.5	44.5	albedo: 0.152	MPC; JPL
2019 CE_{32}	4 February 2019	COIAS,Subaru Telescope (T09)	98	res · 3:5	42.4	0.16	7	35.8	49.0	albedo: 0.126	MPC; JPL
2019 CF_{30}	5 February 2019	COIAS,Subaru Telescope (T09)	85	cubewano (hot)?	42.6	0.14	6	36.9	48.4	albedo: 0.079	MPC; JPL
2019 CF_{32}	4 February 2019	COIAS,Subaru Telescope (T09)	124	cubewano (cold)?	44.2	0.04	3	42.5	45.9	albedo: 0.152	MPC; JPL
2019 CG_{30}	5 February 2019	COIAS,Subaru Telescope (T09)	61	cubewano (cold)?	43.1	0.06	5	40.5	45.8	albedo: 0.152	MPC; JPL
2019 CH_{30}	5 February 2019	COIAS,Subaru Telescope (T09)	72	cubewano (cold)?	45.3	0.12	4	39.8	50.8	albedo: 0.152	MPC; JPL
2019 CH_{32}	5 February 2019	COIAS,Subaru Telescope (T09)	53	cubewano (cold)?	43.1	0.04	2	41.3	44.8	albedo: 0.152	MPC; JPL
2019 CJ_{30}	4 February 2019	COIAS,Subaru Telescope (T09)	128	cubewano (cold)?	43.5	0.05	2	41.3	45.6	albedo: 0.152	MPC; JPL
2019 CK_{31}	4 February 2019	COIAS,Subaru Telescope (T09)	131	centaur	138.3	0.80	11	27.2	249.4	albedo: 0.058	MPC; JPL
2019 CK_{32}	4 February 2019	COIAS,Subaru Telescope (T09)	75	cubewano (cold)?	42.8	0.03	3	41.6	44.0	albedo: 0.152	MPC; JPL
2019 CL_{30}	5 February 2019	COIAS,Subaru Telescope (T09)	57	cubewano (hot)?	42.2	0.07	7	39.1	45.3	albedo: 0.079	MPC; JPL
2019 CL_{31}	5 February 2019	COIAS,Subaru Telescope (T09)	131	cubewano (hot)?	44.1	0.10	29	39.5	48.7	albedo: 0.079	MPC; JPL
2019 CL_{32}	4 February 2019	COIAS,Subaru Telescope (T09)	51	cubewano (cold)?	48.6	0.10	1	43.7	53.6	albedo: 0.152	MPC; JPL
2019 CM_{30}	4 February 2019	COIAS,Subaru Telescope (T09)	81	res · 3:5	42.4	0.15	2	36.2	48.6	albedo: 0.126	MPC; JPL
2019 CM_{31}	5 February 2019	COIAS,Subaru Telescope (T09)	91	res · 5:12	53.8	0.32	5	36.6	71.1	albedo: 0.126	MPC; JPL
2019 CM_{32}	4 February 2019	COIAS,Subaru Telescope (T09)	84	cubewano (cold)?	42.8	0.02	2	41.9	43.7	albedo: 0.152	MPC; JPL
2019 CN_{30}	4 February 2019	COIAS,Subaru Telescope (T09)	37	centaur	57.2	0.61	16	22.1	92.3	albedo: 0.058	MPC; JPL
2019 CN_{31}	5 February 2019	COIAS,Subaru Telescope (T09)	174	SDO	70.6	0.45	21	38.8	102.4	albedo: 0.124	MPC; JPL
2019 CN_{32}	4 February 2019	COIAS,Subaru Telescope (T09)	62	res · 4:7	43.8	0.19	5	35.4	52.2	albedo: 0.126	MPC; JPL
2019 CN_{33}	5 February 2019	COIAS,Subaru Telescope (T09)	146	centaur	33.7	0.42	25	19.6	47.8	albedo: 0.058	MPC; JPL
2019 CO_{30}	4 February 2019	COIAS,Subaru Telescope (T09)	61	res · 3:5	42.2	0.22	10	33.1	51.4	albedo: 0.126	MPC; JPL
2019 CO_{31}	5 February 2019	COIAS,Subaru Telescope (T09)	99	other TNO	46.7	0.22	34	36.3	57.1	albedo: 0.13	MPC; JPL
2019 CO_{32}	5 February 2019	COIAS,Subaru Telescope (T09)	89	centaur	212.0	0.90	5	21.8	402.3	albedo: 0.058	MPC; JPL
2019 CO_{33}	4 February 2019	COIAS,Subaru Telescope (T09)	48	cubewano (cold)?	41.2	0.10	4	37.0	45.3	albedo: 0.152	MPC; JPL
2019 CP_{30}	4 February 2019	COIAS,Subaru Telescope (T09)	113	plutino?	39.4	0.10	4	35.6	43.1	albedo: 0.074	MPC; JPL
2019 CP_{31}	5 February 2019	COIAS,Subaru Telescope (T09)	55	cubewano (cold)?	45.0	0.12	4	39.4	50.6	albedo: 0.152	MPC; JPL
2019 CP_{32}	5 February 2019	COIAS,Subaru Telescope (T09)	94	centaur	40.9	0.28	5	29.5	52.3	albedo: 0.058	MPC; JPL
2019 CQ_{30}	5 February 2019	COIAS,Subaru Telescope (T09)	71	cubewano (cold)?	44.2	0.06	3	41.5	47.0	albedo: 0.152	MPC; JPL
2019 CQ_{31}	5 February 2019	COIAS,Subaru Telescope (T09)	77	cubewano (cold)?	44.0	0.07	4	40.9	47.1	albedo: 0.152	MPC; JPL
2019 CR_{30}	4 February 2019	COIAS,Subaru Telescope (T09)	88	cubewano (cold)?	48.0	0.11	3	42.9	53.1	albedo: 0.152	MPC; JPL
2019 CR_{31}	5 February 2019	COIAS,Subaru Telescope (T09)	96	cubewano (cold)?	45.1	0.22	5	35.2	55.0	albedo: 0.152	MPC; JPL
2019 CS_{30}	5 February 2019	COIAS,Subaru Telescope (T09)	66	cubewano (cold)?	45.2	0.07	4	42.0	48.4	albedo: 0.152	MPC; JPL
2019 CS_{32}	2 February 2019	DECam (W84)	125	SDO	52.7	0.33	19	35.2	70.1	albedo: 0.124	MPC; JPL
2019 CT_{31}	4 February 2019	COIAS,Subaru Telescope (T09)	108	res · 5:9	44.6	0.14	3	38.4	50.8	albedo: 0.126	MPC; JPL
2019 CV_{30}	4 February 2019	COIAS,Subaru Telescope (T09)	139	cubewano (hot)?	46.1	0.07	20	42.7	49.5	albedo: 0.079	MPC; JPL
2019 CW_{30}	4 February 2019	COIAS,Subaru Telescope (T09)	76	cubewano (cold)?	44.3	0.06	2	41.5	47.1	albedo: 0.152	MPC; JPL
2019 CZ_{30}	5 February 2019	COIAS,Subaru Telescope (T09)	98	centaur	52.5	0.47	15	28.0	77.1	albedo: 0.058	MPC; JPL
2019 EA_{5}	6 March 2019	Cerro Tololo Observatory, La Serena (807)	171	SDO	71.8	0.47	28	38.4	105.3	albedo: 0.124	MPC; JPL
2019 EA_{9}	8 March 2019	COIAS,Subaru Telescope (T09)	84	cubewano (cold)?	44.1	0.12	3	39.0	49.3	albedo: 0.152	MPC; JPL
2019 EB_{5}	4 March 2019	Cerro Tololo Observatory, La Serena (807)	155	SDO	52.8	0.31	8	36.3	69.4	albedo: 0.124	MPC; JPL
2019 ED_{10}	7 March 2019	COIAS,Subaru Telescope (T09)	70	SDO	115.3	0.66	4	39.6	191.1	albedo: 0.124	MPC; JPL
2019 EE_{6}	5 March 2019	Maunakea (568)	199	SDO	199.4	0.62	163	75.0	323.7	albedo: 0.124	MPC; JPL
2019 EF_{6}	5 March 2019	Maunakea (568)	230	centaur	119.1	0.81	9	22.3	216.0	albedo: 0.058	MPC; JPL
2019 EF_{8}	8 March 2019	COIAS,Subaru Telescope (T09)	69	other TNO	46.6	0.31	17	32.2	61.0	albedo: 0.13	MPC; JPL
2019 EG_{7}	8 March 2019	COIAS,Subaru Telescope (T09)	127	cubewano (cold)?	44.3	0.07	2	41.0	47.5	albedo: 0.152	MPC; JPL
2019 EG_{8}	8 March 2019	COIAS,Subaru Telescope (T09)	100	cubewano (hot)?	45.5	0.09	12	41.2	49.7	albedo: 0.079	MPC; JPL
2019 EH_{10}	8 March 2019	COIAS,Subaru Telescope (T09)	81	cubewano (cold)?	43.8	0.05	2	41.6	46.1	albedo: 0.152	MPC; JPL
2019 EH_{7}	8 March 2019	COIAS,Subaru Telescope (T09)	110	res · 4:9	51.8	0.24	29	39.5	64.2	albedo: 0.126	MPC; JPL
2019 EH_{8}	8 March 2019	COIAS,Subaru Telescope (T09)	77	cubewano (hot)?	43.1	0.13	26	37.6	48.6	albedo: 0.079	MPC; JPL
2019 EJ_{3}	4 March 2019	CSS (703)	0.2	amor	97.7	0.99	140	1.1	194.4	albedo: 0.048	MPC; JPL
2019 EJ_{7}	8 March 2019	COIAS,Subaru Telescope (T09)	88	cubewano (hot)?	45.3	0.13	7	39.6	51.0	albedo: 0.079	MPC; JPL
2019 EK_{7}	8 March 2019	COIAS,Subaru Telescope (T09)	77	cubewano (cold)?	44.3	0.07	2	41.1	47.5	albedo: 0.152	MPC; JPL
2019 EL_{7}	8 March 2019	COIAS,Subaru Telescope (T09)	74	cubewano (cold)?	42.5	0.01	3	42.0	43.1	albedo: 0.152	MPC; JPL
2019 EM_{8}	8 March 2019	COIAS,Subaru Telescope (T09)	123	cubewano (hot)?	42.9	0.08	10	39.5	46.2	albedo: 0.079	MPC; JPL
2019 EN_{7}	8 March 2019	COIAS,Subaru Telescope (T09)	106	cubewano (cold)?	42.9	0.04	3	41.2	44.6	albedo: 0.152	MPC; JPL
2019 EN_{9}	3 March 2019	COIAS,Subaru Telescope (T09)	104	cubewano (cold)?	44.9	0.12	5	39.6	50.3	albedo: 0.152	MPC; JPL
2019 EO_{10}	—	—	—	—	40.5	0.03	13	39.2	41.8	—	MPC; JPL
2019 EO_{7}	8 March 2019	COIAS,Subaru Telescope (T09)	123	centaur	38.6	0.11	1	34.5	42.6	albedo: 0.058	MPC; JPL
2019 EO_{9}	3 March 2019	COIAS,Subaru Telescope (T09)	88	cubewano (cold)?	43.9	0.09	4	40.1	47.7	albedo: 0.152	MPC; JPL
2019 EP_{10}	—	—	—	—	44.3	0.10	21	39.9	48.7	—	MPC; JPL
2019 EP_{7}	8 March 2019	COIAS,Subaru Telescope (T09)	69	cubewano (cold)?	49.2	0.10	1	44.2	54.3	albedo: 0.152	MPC; JPL
2019 EQ_{10}	—	—	—	—	48.6	0.10	3	43.9	53.4	—	MPC; JPL
2019 EQ_{7}	3 March 2019	COIAS,Subaru Telescope (T09)	74	SDO	53.3	0.33	6	35.8	70.9	albedo: 0.124	MPC; JPL
2019 EQ_{9}	3 March 2019	COIAS,Subaru Telescope (T09)	97	cubewano (cold)?	46.1	0.03	3	44.7	47.5	albedo: 0.152	MPC; JPL
2019 ER_{7}	2 March 2019	COIAS,Subaru Telescope (T09)	145	other TNO	38.5	0.06	34	36.3	40.7	albedo: 0.13	MPC; JPL
2019 ES_{7}	8 March 2019	COIAS,Subaru Telescope (T09)	90	cubewano (cold)?	42.9	0.04	3	41.1	44.6	albedo: 0.152	MPC; JPL
2019 ES_{9}	8 March 2019	COIAS,Subaru Telescope (T09)	99	cubewano (hot)?	45.6	0.15	18	39.0	52.3	albedo: 0.079	MPC; JPL
2019 ET_{5}	5 March 2019	Maunakea (568)	187	res · 3:7?	52.9	0.26	12	39.3	66.5	albedo: 0.126	MPC; JPL
2019 ET_{7}	8 March 2019	COIAS,Subaru Telescope (T09)	97	cubewano (cold)?	42.9	0.03	2	41.5	44.2	albedo: 0.152	MPC; JPL
2019 ET_{8}	8 March 2019	COIAS,Subaru Telescope (T09)	159	cubewano (cold)?	43.7	0.03	3	42.5	44.9	albedo: 0.152	MPC; JPL
2019 EU_{5}	5 March 2019	Maunakea (568)	203	EDDO	1362.9	0.97	18	47.0	2678.8	albedo: 0.124	MPC; JPL
2019 EU_{7}	7 March 2019	COIAS,Subaru Telescope (T09)	105	cubewano (cold)?	44.1	0.09	3	40.1	48.1	albedo: 0.152	MPC; JPL
2019 EU_{8}	3 March 2019	COIAS,Subaru Telescope (T09)	79	twotino	47.8	0.11	6	42.8	52.8	albedo: 0.126	MPC; JPL
2019 EV_{5}	5 March 2019	Maunakea (568)	117	SDO	56.3	0.43	9	32.1	80.5	albedo: 0.124	MPC; JPL
2019 EV_{8}	3 March 2019	COIAS,Subaru Telescope (T09)	99	cubewano (cold)?	46.5	0.04	4	44.5	48.6	albedo: 0.152	MPC; JPL
2019 EV_{9}	8 March 2019	COIAS,Subaru Telescope (T09)	82	plutino	39.4	0.07	12	36.6	42.2	albedo: 0.074	MPC; JPL
2019 EW_{7}	3 March 2019	COIAS,Subaru Telescope (T09)	167	centaur	37.5	0.59	4	15.4	59.6	albedo: 0.058	MPC; JPL
2019 EW_{8}	3 March 2019	COIAS,Subaru Telescope (T09)	77	res · 3:5	42.5	0.21	14	33.8	51.1	albedo: 0.126	MPC; JPL
2019 EW_{9}	8 March 2019	COIAS,Subaru Telescope (T09)	169	cubewano (hot)?	46.3	0.24	11	35.3	57.3	albedo: 0.079	MPC; JPL
2019 EX_{7}	3 March 2019	COIAS,Subaru Telescope (T09)	106	centaur	69.7	0.82	11	12.7	126.6	albedo: 0.058	MPC; JPL
2019 EY_{8}	3 March 2019	COIAS,Subaru Telescope (T09)	76	cubewano (cold)?	46.1	0.11	4	40.9	51.2	albedo: 0.152	MPC; JPL
2019 EZ_{8}	3 March 2019	COIAS,Subaru Telescope (T09)	94	cubewano (cold)?	44.8	0.05	5	42.6	47.0	albedo: 0.152	MPC; JPL
2019 EZ_{9}	8 March 2019	COIAS,Subaru Telescope (T09)	52	res · 3:4	36.5	0.21	12	29.1	44.0	albedo: 0.126	MPC; JPL
2019 GA_{185}	5 April 2019	COIAS,Subaru Telescope (T09)	150	cubewano (cold)?	45.0	0.05	4	42.7	47.4	albedo: 0.152	MPC; JPL
2019 GB_{143}	7 April 2019	Korea Microlensing Telescope Network-CTIO (W93)	119	cubewano (cold)?	42.3	0.10	1	38.2	46.4	albedo: 0.152	MPC; JPL
2019 GC_{207}	—	—	—	—	39.5	0.09	9.1	36.0	43.0	—	MPC; JPL
2019 GE_{185}	7 April 2019	COIAS,Subaru Telescope (T09)	110	SDO	91.8	0.60	28	36.6	147.1	albedo: 0.124	MPC; JPL
2019 GE_{196}	4 April 2019	COIAS,Subaru Telescope (T09)	49	other TNO	37.6	0.05	26	35.6	39.5	albedo: 0.13	MPC; JPL
2019 GE_{199}	4 April 2019	COIAS,Subaru Telescope (T09)	82	centaur	196.2	0.84	8	30.7	361.7	albedo: 0.058	MPC; JPL
2019 GF_{186}	7 April 2019	COIAS,Subaru Telescope (T09)	70	SDO	73.4	0.50	12	36.8	110.1	albedo: 0.124	MPC; JPL
2019 GG_{185}	7 April 2019	COIAS,Subaru Telescope (T09)	65	other TNO	49.8	0.24	8	38.0	61.6	albedo: 0.13	MPC; JPL
2019 GG_{186}	5 April 2019	COIAS,Subaru Telescope (T09)	100	other TNO	44.2	0.17	13	36.7	51.6	albedo: 0.13	MPC; JPL
2019 GH_{185}	7 April 2019	COIAS,Subaru Telescope (T09)	65	SDO	66.9	0.46	9	36.2	97.6	albedo: 0.124	MPC; JPL
2019 GH_{186}	5 April 2019	COIAS,Subaru Telescope (T09)	89	cubewano (hot)?	46.8	0.14	30	40.3	53.2	albedo: 0.079	MPC; JPL
2019 GH_{201}	4 April 2019	COIAS,Subaru Telescope (T09)	94	centaur	76.9	0.74	3	20.3	133.5	albedo: 0.058	MPC; JPL
2019 GJ_{185}	7 April 2019	COIAS,Subaru Telescope (T09)	60	other TNO	46.2	0.17	23	38.4	54.0	albedo: 0.13	MPC; JPL
2019 GJ_{186}	5 April 2019	COIAS,Subaru Telescope (T09)	57	centaur	34.6	0.30	25	24.3	44.8	albedo: 0.058	MPC; JPL
2019 GJ_{196}	7 April 2019	COIAS,Subaru Telescope (T09)	174	cubewano (hot)?	41.4	0.10	38	37.2	45.7	albedo: 0.079	MPC; JPL
2019 GJ_{23}	5 April 2019	Korea Microlensing Telescope Network-CTIO (W93)	133	cubewano (cold)	43.9	0.08	1	40.4	47.5	albedo: 0.152	MPC; JPL
2019 GK_{183}	7 April 2019	COIAS,Subaru Telescope (T09)	91	cubewano (hot)?	42.9	0.05	10	40.9	44.9	albedo: 0.079	MPC; JPL
2019 GK_{185}	7 April 2019	COIAS,Subaru Telescope (T09)	166	cubewano (hot)?	43.2	0.04	8	41.4	45.1	albedo: 0.079	MPC; JPL
2019 GK_{196}	7 April 2019	COIAS,Subaru Telescope (T09)	45	res · 5:8	41.2	0.23	29	32.0	50.5	albedo: 0.126	MPC; JPL
2019 GL_{186}	5 April 2019	COIAS,Subaru Telescope (T09)	160	plutino	39.4	0.17	7	32.6	46.1	albedo: 0.074	MPC; JPL
2019 GL_{196}	5 April 2019	COIAS,Subaru Telescope (T09)	107	cubewano (hot)?	45.3	0.23	25	35.1	55.5	albedo: 0.079	MPC; JPL
2019 GM_{140}	5 April 2019	Korea Microlensing Telescope Network-CTIO (W93)	120	res · 3:4	36.4	0.08	5	33.7	39.2	albedo: 0.126	MPC; JPL
2019 GM_{186}	5 April 2019	COIAS,Subaru Telescope (T09)	115	cubewano (hot)?	41.8	0.07	6	38.7	44.9	albedo: 0.079	MPC; JPL
2019 GM_{188}	4 April 2019	COIAS,Subaru Telescope (T09)	98	SDO	53.2	0.36	4	34.1	72.3	albedo: 0.124	MPC; JPL
2019 GN_{186}	5 April 2019	COIAS,Subaru Telescope (T09)	91	other TNO	47.1	0.17	21	39.1	55.0	albedo: 0.13	MPC; JPL
2019 GN_{188}	4 April 2019	COIAS,Subaru Telescope (T09)	117	SDO	57.1	0.36	7	36.4	77.8	albedo: 0.124	MPC; JPL
2019 GO_{140}	5 April 2019	Korea Microlensing Telescope Network-CTIO (W93)	83	other TNO	82.4	0.58	4	34.5	130.4	albedo: 0.13	MPC; JPL
2019 GO_{186}	5 April 2019	COIAS,Subaru Telescope (T09)	74	twotino	47.8	0.27	15	35.0	60.7	albedo: 0.126	MPC; JPL
2019 GP_{186}	5 April 2019	COIAS,Subaru Telescope (T09)	106	SDO	97.4	0.63	29	35.9	158.9	albedo: 0.124	MPC; JPL
2019 GP_{187}	4 April 2019	COIAS,Subaru Telescope (T09)	41	cubewano (cold)?	43.9	0.01	4	43.4	44.4	albedo: 0.152	MPC; JPL
2019 GP_{188}	5 April 2019	COIAS,Subaru Telescope (T09)	193	other TNO	47.1	0.17	13	39.1	55.0	albedo: 0.13	MPC; JPL
2019 GQ_{186}	4 April 2019	COIAS,Subaru Telescope (T09)	77	cubewano (hot)?	46.7	0.08	20	42.8	50.6	albedo: 0.079	MPC; JPL
2019 GQ_{187}	4 April 2019	COIAS,Subaru Telescope (T09)	48	other TNO	38.4	0.10	6	34.7	42.2	albedo: 0.13	MPC; JPL
2019 GR_{140}	7 April 2019	Korea Microlensing Telescope Network-CTIO (W93)	112	cubewano (cold)?	43.8	0.37	1	27.4	60.2	albedo: 0.152	MPC; JPL
2019 GS_{185}	5 April 2019	COIAS,Subaru Telescope (T09)	134	centaur	45.6	0.39	21	28.0	63.2	albedo: 0.058	MPC; JPL
2019 GS_{187}	5 April 2019	COIAS,Subaru Telescope (T09)	113	plutino	39.5	0.21	11	31.3	47.7	albedo: 0.074	MPC; JPL
2019 GS_{188}	5 April 2019	COIAS,Subaru Telescope (T09)	149	cubewano (hot)?	43.7	0.11	16	39.0	48.3	albedo: 0.079	MPC; JPL
2019 GT_{184}	5 April 2019	COIAS,Subaru Telescope (T09)	88	cubewano (cold)?	44.0	0.06	4	41.3	46.7	albedo: 0.152	MPC; JPL
2019 GT_{187}	4 April 2019	COIAS,Subaru Telescope (T09)	84	cubewano (hot)?	45.6	0.17	10	37.9	53.3	albedo: 0.079	MPC; JPL
2019 GT_{195}	4 April 2019	COIAS,Subaru Telescope (T09)	55	SDO	151.0	0.80	18	30.2	271.8	albedo: 0.124	MPC; JPL
2019 GT_{205}	—	—	—	—	41.2	0.07	29	38.4	44.0	—	MPC; JPL
2019 GU_{184}	5 April 2019	COIAS,Subaru Telescope (T09)	63	cubewano (cold)?	43.9	0.08	3	40.6	47.2	albedo: 0.152	MPC; JPL
2019 GU_{186}	5 April 2019	COIAS,Subaru Telescope (T09)	118	cubewano (hot)?	42.2	0.22	26	32.9	51.6	albedo: 0.079	MPC; JPL
2019 GU_{187}	4 April 2019	COIAS,Subaru Telescope (T09)	69	cubewano (hot)?	43.3	0.14	10	37.1	49.5	albedo: 0.079	MPC; JPL
2019 GV_{184}	4 April 2019	COIAS,Subaru Telescope (T09)	85	SDO	77.6	0.56	12	34.0	121.3	albedo: 0.124	MPC; JPL
2019 GW_{184}	4 April 2019	COIAS,Subaru Telescope (T09)	64	SDO	92.9	0.63	5	34.9	150.9	albedo: 0.124	MPC; JPL
2019 GW_{198}	7 April 2019	COIAS,Subaru Telescope (T09)	144	centaur	441.1	0.95	6	20.2	862.0	albedo: 0.058	MPC; JPL
2019 GX_{184}	4 April 2019	COIAS,Subaru Telescope (T09)	76	cubewano (cold)?	44.0	0.08	5	40.7	47.4	albedo: 0.152	MPC; JPL
2019 GX_{196}	5 April 2019	COIAS,Subaru Telescope (T09)	41	other TNO	36.0	0.12	6	31.6	40.5	albedo: 0.13	MPC; JPL
2019 GY_{184}	4 April 2019	COIAS,Subaru Telescope (T09)	169	cubewano (cold)?	44.3	0.06	4	41.6	47.0	albedo: 0.152	MPC; JPL
2019 GY_{196}	4 April 2019	COIAS,Subaru Telescope (T09)	68	centaur	124.4	0.83	29	21.5	227.3	albedo: 0.058	MPC; JPL
2019 GZ_{129}	4 April 2019	Cerro Tololo Observatory, La Serena (807)	145	res · 1:3	62.5	0.37	9	39.2	85.8	albedo: 0.126	MPC; JPL
2019 GZ_{184}	4 April 2019	COIAS,Subaru Telescope (T09)	118	other TNO	50.4	0.30	19	35.5	65.4	albedo: 0.13	MPC; JPL
2019 JA_{145}	8 May 2019	COIAS,Subaru Telescope (T09)	113	plutino?	39.4	0.18	13	32.4	46.4	albedo: 0.074	MPC; JPL
2019 JP_{152}	—	—	—	—	45.3	0.10	2	40.9	49.7	—	MPC; JPL
2019 JQ_{150}	9 May 2019	Cerro Tololo-DECam (W84)	171	centaur	110.7	0.74	9	29.1	192.3	albedo: 0.058	MPC; JPL
2019 JR_{150}	9 May 2019	Cerro Tololo-DECam (W84)	130	other TNO	35.3	0.09	12	32.2	38.5	albedo: 0.13	MPC; JPL
2019 JS_{150}	9 May 2019	Cerro Tololo-DECam (W84)	217	centaur	32.8	0.11	13	29.3	36.2	albedo: 0.058	MPC; JPL
2019 JW_{147}	8 May 2019	COIAS,Subaru Telescope (T09)	100	res · 4:7	43.8	0.13	7	38.0	49.6	albedo: 0.126	MPC; JPL
2019 JX_{147}	8 May 2019	COIAS,Subaru Telescope (T09)	105	centaur	61.1	0.51	9	30.1	92.1	albedo: 0.058	MPC; JPL
2019 PK_{99}	5 August 2019	DECam (W84)	70	other TNO	35.2	0.11	11	31.5	39.0	albedo: 0.13	MPC; JPL
2019 PL_{99}	5 August 2019	DECam (W84)	43	other TNO	35.9	0.09	23	32.6	39.2	albedo: 0.13	MPC; JPL
2019 PS_{99}	5 August 2019	DECam (W84)	71	other TNO	39.4	0.22	10	30.9	47.9	albedo: 0.13	MPC; JPL
2019 PT_{99}	6 August 2019	DECam (W84)	200	cubewano (hot)?	43.1	0.02	19	42.4	43.8	albedo: 0.079	MPC; JPL
2019 PV_{99}	6 August 2019	DECam (W84)	178	cubewano (hot)?	43.5	0.11	11	38.9	48.1	albedo: 0.079	MPC; JPL
2019 QA_{110}	28 August 2019	DECam (W84)	90	cubewano (cold)	45.2	0.10	2	40.9	49.5	albedo: 0.152	MPC; JPL
2019 QA_{111}	29 August 2019	DECam (W84)	68	cubewano (cold)	44.4	0.06	4	41.6	47.2	albedo: 0.152	MPC; JPL
2019 QA_{135}	—	—	—	—	44.3	0.11	3	39.5	49.0	—	MPC; JPL
2019 QB_{110}	28 August 2019	DECam (W84)	68	cubewano (cold)	42.5	0.02	4	41.5	43.5	albedo: 0.152	MPC; JPL
2019 QB_{111}	29 August 2019	DECam (W84)	71	cubewano (hot)?	42.5	0.16	24	35.8	49.2	albedo: 0.079	MPC; JPL
2019 QB_{134}	—	—	—	—	43.9	0.04	1	42.2	45.7	—	MPC; JPL
2019 QB_{135}	—	—	—	—	38.2	0.03	3	37.2	39.2	—	MPC; JPL
2019 QC_{110}	28 August 2019	DECam (W84)	97	cubewano (cold)	45.8	0.01	1	45.5	46.1	albedo: 0.152	MPC; JPL
2019 QC_{111}	29 August 2019	DECam (W84)	120	cubewano (cold)	43.2	0.04	2	41.7	44.7	albedo: 0.152	MPC; JPL
2019 QC_{134}	—	—	—	—	43.9	0.07	1	40.9	47.0	—	MPC; JPL
2019 QC_{135}	—	—	—	—	43.7	0.07	2	40.5	46.9	—	MPC; JPL
2019 QD_{110}	28 August 2019	DECam (W84)	43	cubewano (cold)	43.0	0.05	3	40.7	45.3	albedo: 0.152	MPC; JPL
2019 QD_{111}	30 August 2019	DECam (W84)	56	cubewano (cold)	43.1	0.06	3	40.4	45.8	albedo: 0.152	MPC; JPL
2019 QD_{112}	28 August 2019	DECam (W84)	115	cubewano (cold)	43.0	0.02	1	42.3	43.7	albedo: 0.152	MPC; JPL
2019 QD_{134}	—	—	—	—	43.6	0.02	3	42.5	44.6	—	MPC; JPL
2019 QD_{135}	—	—	—	—	42.5	0.05	3	40.4	44.6	—	MPC; JPL
2019 QE_{110}	28 August 2019	DECam (W84)	83	cubewano (cold)	43.5	0.01	2	43.0	44.0	albedo: 0.152	MPC; JPL
2019 QE_{111}	29 August 2019	DECam (W84)	69	cubewano (cold)	43.9	0.05	2	41.9	45.9	albedo: 0.152	MPC; JPL
2019 QE_{112}	30 August 2019	DECam (W84)	126	cubewano (cold)	44.6	0.06	4	42.1	47.1	albedo: 0.152	MPC; JPL
2019 QE_{134}	—	—	—	—	42.7	0.04	3	40.9	44.6	—	MPC; JPL
2019 QF_{110}	28 August 2019	DECam (W84)	50	cubewano (cold)?	43.4	0.02	3	42.6	44.3	albedo: 0.152	MPC; JPL
2019 QF_{111}	30 August 2019	DECam (W84)	128	cubewano (cold)	44.3	0.08	3	40.9	47.7	albedo: 0.152	MPC; JPL
2019 QF_{112}	29 August 2019	DECam (W84)	201	plutino	39.3	0.21	12	31.1	47.5	albedo: 0.074	MPC; JPL
2019 QF_{134}	—	—	—	—	60.0	0.39	4	36.5	83.5	—	MPC; JPL
2019 QG_{110}	28 August 2019	DECam (W84)	73	cubewano (cold)	43.9	0.08	0	40.4	47.4	albedo: 0.152	MPC; JPL
2019 QG_{111}	30 August 2019	DECam (W84)	42	cubewano (cold)	43.2	0.05	2	41.2	45.1	albedo: 0.152	MPC; JPL
2019 QG_{134}	—	—	—	—	42.1	0.09	3	38.4	45.8	—	MPC; JPL
2019 QH_{110}	28 August 2019	DECam (W84)	77	cubewano (cold)	44.1	0.10	1	39.8	48.3	albedo: 0.152	MPC; JPL
2019 QH_{111}	30 August 2019	DECam (W84)	46	cubewano (cold)	44.4	0.07	3	41.2	47.5	albedo: 0.152	MPC; JPL
2019 QH_{134}	—	—	—	—	46.6	0.14	3	40.0	53.2	—	MPC; JPL
2019 QJ_{110}	28 August 2019	DECam (W84)	47	cubewano (cold)	44.0	0.07	2	40.9	47.1	albedo: 0.152	MPC; JPL
2019 QJ_{111}	30 August 2019	DECam (W84)	74	cubewano (cold)	42.8	0.02	3	42.1	43.6	albedo: 0.152	MPC; JPL
2019 QJ_{134}	—	—	—	—	44.4	0.03	2	43.2	45.6	—	MPC; JPL
2019 QK_{110}	28 August 2019	DECam (W84)	121	twotino	47.7	0.19	12	38.8	56.5	albedo: 0.126	MPC; JPL
2019 QK_{134}	—	—	—	—	45.3	0.06	4	42.5	48.1	—	MPC; JPL
2019 QL_{110}	28 August 2019	DECam (W84)	61	cubewano (cold)	44.3	0.10	4	40.1	48.6	albedo: 0.152	MPC; JPL
2019 QL_{111}	30 August 2019	DECam (W84)	68	cubewano (cold)	43.2	0.07	2	40.2	46.2	albedo: 0.152	MPC; JPL
2019 QL_{134}	—	—	—	—	43.6	0.16	5	36.6	50.5	—	MPC; JPL
2019 QM_{110}	28 August 2019	DECam (W84)	60	cubewano (hot)	43.1	0.12	9	38.1	48.0	albedo: 0.079	MPC; JPL
2019 QM_{111}	30 August 2019	DECam (W84)	59	cubewano (cold)	44.9	0.10	3	40.4	49.4	albedo: 0.152	MPC; JPL
2019 QM_{134}	—	—	—	—	42.8	0.03	1	41.5	44.1	—	MPC; JPL
2019 QN_{110}	28 August 2019	DECam (W84)	49	cubewano (cold)	45.5	0.07	3	42.4	48.6	albedo: 0.152	MPC; JPL
2019 QN_{111}	30 August 2019	DECam (W84)	66	cubewano (cold)	44.9	0.04	3	43.3	46.5	albedo: 0.152	MPC; JPL
2019 QN_{134}	—	—	—	—	43.2	0.01	2	42.9	43.6	—	MPC; JPL
2019 QO_{110}	28 August 2019	DECam (W84)	114	cubewano (cold)	43.0	0.05	2	41.0	45.1	albedo: 0.152	MPC; JPL
2019 QO_{111}	30 August 2019	DECam (W84)	131	other TNO	55.4	0.22	18	42.9	67.8	albedo: 0.13	MPC; JPL
2019 QO_{134}	—	—	—	—	42.2	0.14	4	36.1	48.3	—	MPC; JPL
2019 QP_{110}	29 August 2019	DECam (W84)	48	other TNO	40.5	0.09	21	36.7	44.3	albedo: 0.13	MPC; JPL
2019 QP_{111}	30 August 2019	DECam (W84)	67	cubewano (cold)	42.4	0.01	3	41.9	42.9	albedo: 0.152	MPC; JPL
2019 QP_{134}	—	—	—	—	44.1	0.06	1	41.6	46.6	—	MPC; JPL
2019 QQ_{110}	29 August 2019	DECam (W84)	84	cubewano (hot)	44.7	0.07	6	41.6	47.8	albedo: 0.079	MPC; JPL
2019 QQ_{111}	30 August 2019	DECam (W84)	43	cubewano (cold)?	44.0	0.03	3	42.9	45.1	albedo: 0.152	MPC; JPL
2019 QQ_{134}	—	—	—	—	42.5	0.03	2	41.3	43.6	—	MPC; JPL
2019 QQ_{8}	28 August 2019	Pan-STARRS 1 (F51)	10	centaur	59.1	0.88	24	6.8	111.4	albedo: 0.058	MPC; JPL
2019 QR_{110}	30 August 2019	DECam (W84)	62	cubewano (cold)	43.2	0.02	1	42.2	44.2	albedo: 0.152	MPC; JPL
2019 QR_{111}	30 August 2019	DECam (W84)	77	cubewano (hot)?	46.5	0.22	7	36.5	56.6	albedo: 0.079	MPC; JPL
2019 QR_{134}	—	—	—	—	44.8	0.09	2	40.7	48.9	—	MPC; JPL
2019 QS_{109}	28 August 2019	DECam (W84)	68	res · 4:7?	43.6	0.06	1	41.2	46.1	albedo: 0.126	MPC; JPL
2019 QS_{110}	30 August 2019	DECam (W84)	86	cubewano (cold)	44.4	0.04	2	42.6	46.3	albedo: 0.152	MPC; JPL
2019 QS_{111}	28 August 2019	DECam (W84)	74	cubewano (cold)	42.7	0.06	1	40.3	45.1	albedo: 0.152	MPC; JPL
2019 QS_{134}	—	—	—	—	38.2	0.05	5	36.3	40.1	—	MPC; JPL
2019 QT_{109}	28 August 2019	DECam (W84)	57	cubewano (cold)	46.1	0.11	2	40.8	51.3	albedo: 0.152	MPC; JPL
2019 QT_{110}	30 August 2019	DECam (W84)	83	cubewano (hot)	45.5	0.12	7	39.9	51.2	albedo: 0.079	MPC; JPL
2019 QT_{111}	28 August 2019	DECam (W84)	80	cubewano (cold)	43.7	0.03	2	42.3	45.2	albedo: 0.152	MPC; JPL
2019 QT_{134}	—	—	—	—	43.7	0.16	8	36.6	50.8	—	MPC; JPL
2019 QU_{109}	29 August 2019	DECam (W84)	99	cubewano (hot)	45.9	0.10	11	41.5	50.2	albedo: 0.079	MPC; JPL
2019 QU_{110}	29 August 2019	DECam (W84)	73	cubewano (cold)	45.4	0.08	2	41.6	49.3	albedo: 0.152	MPC; JPL
2019 QU_{134}	—	—	—	—	46.2	0.21	8	36.6	55.8	—	MPC; JPL
2019 QV_{109}	29 August 2019	DECam (W84)	99	SDO	69.4	0.52	7	33.3	105.4	albedo: 0.124	MPC; JPL
2019 QV_{110}	29 August 2019	DECam (W84)	44	other TNO	38.5	0.06	2	36.3	40.6	albedo: 0.13	MPC; JPL
2019 QV_{134}	—	—	—	—	44.4	0.05	3	42.0	46.9	—	MPC; JPL
2019 QW_{110}	29 August 2019	DECam (W84)	61	cubewano (cold)	42.7	0.03	2	41.7	43.8	albedo: 0.152	MPC; JPL
2019 QW_{134}	—	—	—	—	44.9	0.11	2	39.9	49.9	—	MPC; JPL
2019 QX_{110}	30 August 2019	DECam (W84)	123	res · 4:7?	43.7	0.08	3	40.4	47.0	albedo: 0.126	MPC; JPL
2019 QX_{134}	—	—	—	—	43.6	0.10	8	39.2	48.1	—	MPC; JPL
2019 QY_{109}	29 August 2019	DECam (W84)	91	cubewano (hot)	46.3	0.10	7	41.9	50.8	albedo: 0.079	MPC; JPL
2019 QY_{110}	30 August 2019	DECam (W84)	68	cubewano (cold)	42.6	0.08	2	39.3	46.0	albedo: 0.152	MPC; JPL
2019 QY_{134}	—	—	—	—	45.4	0.07	3	42.2	48.6	—	MPC; JPL
2019 QZ_{109}	29 August 2019	DECam (W84)	79	cubewano (hot)	44.3	0.07	6	41.2	47.4	albedo: 0.079	MPC; JPL
2019 QZ_{110}	30 August 2019	DECam (W84)	56	plutino	39.3	0.12	10	34.6	44.0	albedo: 0.074	MPC; JPL
2019 QZ_{134}	—	—	—	—	43.9	0.07	2	40.8	47.0	—	MPC; JPL
2019 RO_{4}	4 September 2019	Lowell Discovery Telescope (G37)	188	cubewano (hot)?	41.6	0.18	20	34.3	48.8	albedo: 0.079	MPC; JPL
2019 SB_{235}	29 September 2019	DECam (W84)	116	cubewano (hot)	43.0	0.10	22	39.0	47.1	albedo: 0.079	MPC; JPL
2019 SH_{235}	27 September 2019	DECam (W84)	85	cubewano (hot)	46.2	0.14	27	40.0	52.5	albedo: 0.079	MPC; JPL
2019 SJ_{187}	26 September 2019	Cerro Tololo Observatory, La Serena (807)	194	SDO	73.8	0.51	21	36.4	111.3	albedo: 0.124	MPC; JPL
2019 SJ_{235}	29 September 2019	DECam (W84)	60	cubewano (hot)	41.9	0.05	18	39.7	44.2	albedo: 0.079	MPC; JPL
2019 SJ_{289}	16 September 2019	Cerro Tololo-DECam (W84)	—	—	41.4	0.01	20	41.1	41.6	—	MPC; JPL
2019 SK_{194}	24 September 2019	DECam (W84)	139	SDO	77.1	0.57	13	33.0	121.3	albedo: 0.124	MPC; JPL
2019 SK_{235}	29 September 2019	DECam (W84)	53	cubewano (cold)	44.1	0.06	1	41.4	46.8	albedo: 0.152	MPC; JPL
2019 SL_{235}	29 September 2019	DECam (W84)	72	cubewano (cold)?	44.3	0.12	1	39.1	49.4	albedo: 0.152	MPC; JPL
2019 SM_{235}	29 September 2019	DECam (W84)	55	cubewano (cold)	43.2	0.06	2	40.5	45.8	albedo: 0.152	MPC; JPL
2019 SN_{235}	27 September 2019	DECam (W84)	144	cubewano (hot)?	45.2	0.17	12	37.7	52.7	albedo: 0.079	MPC; JPL
2019 SO_{204}	24 September 2019	Cerro Tololo Observatory, La Serena (807)	145	SDO	102.5	0.66	13	34.7	170.4	albedo: 0.124	MPC; JPL
2019 SO_{235}	28 September 2019	DECam (W84)	52	cubewano (cold)	43.9	0.05	3	41.6	46.3	albedo: 0.152	MPC; JPL
2019 SP_{235}	28 September 2019	DECam (W84)	45	cubewano (cold)	43.9	0.08	4	40.6	47.2	albedo: 0.152	MPC; JPL
2019 SQ_{247}	29 September 2019	COIAS,Subaru Telescope (T09)	80	cubewano (hot)?	41.3	0.18	32	33.7	48.9	albedo: 0.079	MPC; JPL
2019 SS_{149}	24 September 2019	Cerro Tololo Observatory, La Serena (807)	215	SDO	118.7	0.70	15	35.2	202.2	albedo: 0.124	MPC; JPL
2019 TX_{7}	7 October 2019	Pan-STARRS 1 (F51)	10	centaur	33.2	0.80	5	6.6	59.7	albedo: 0.058	MPC; JPL
2019 UD_{174}	31 October 2019	COIAS,Subaru Telescope (T09)	76	cubewano (hot)?	43.7	0.12	18	38.3	49.1	albedo: 0.079	MPC; JPL
2019 UE_{174}	31 October 2019	COIAS,Subaru Telescope (T09)	59	other TNO	48.8	0.26	28	36.1	61.5	albedo: 0.13	MPC; JPL
2019 UF_{178}	27 October 2019	COIAS,Subaru Telescope (T09)	40	plutino	39.7	0.27	23	28.9	50.6	albedo: 0.074	MPC; JPL
2019 UH_{12}	27 October 2019	Pan-STARRS 2 (F52)	40	centaur	52.4	0.85	47	7.9	96.9	albedo: 0.058	MPC; JPL
2019 UH_{213}	—	—	—	—	147.4	0.82	9	27.0	267.8	—	MPC; JPL
2019 UJ_{214}	—	—	—	—	73.9	0.54	19.6	33.9	113.8	—	MPC; JPL
2019 UK_{214}	—	—	—	—	76.1	0.51	3.4	37.0	115.2	—	MPC; JPL
2019 UM_{173}	31 October 2019	COIAS,Subaru Telescope (T09)	68	other TNO	41.4	0.15	31	35.0	47.8	albedo: 0.13	MPC; JPL
2019 UN_{211}	—	—	—	—	42.2	0.09	27	38.2	46.2	—	MPC; JPL
2019 UO_{211}	—	—	—	—	44.0	0.11	4	39.3	48.7	—	MPC; JPL
2019 UU_{173}	27 October 2019	COIAS,Subaru Telescope (T09)	80	res · 3:7	53.1	0.25	26	39.9	66.3	albedo: 0.126	MPC; JPL
2019 UV_{173}	27 October 2019	COIAS,Subaru Telescope (T09)	46	SDO	80.6	0.54	26	37.0	124.2	albedo: 0.124	MPC; JPL
2019 UW_{173}	31 October 2019	COIAS,Subaru Telescope (T09)	42	res · 3:5	42.4	0.14	21	36.3	48.5	albedo: 0.126	MPC; JPL
2019 UY_{159}	31 October 2019	COIAS,Subaru Telescope (T09)	57	cubewano (hot)?	44.2	0.15	22	37.8	50.7	albedo: 0.079	MPC; JPL
2019 UY_{203}	27 October 2019	COIAS,Subaru Telescope (T09)	92	cubewano (hot)?	45.1	0.09	10	40.9	49.3	albedo: 0.079	MPC; JPL
2019 UZ_{173}	27 October 2019	COIAS,Subaru Telescope (T09)	161	twotino	47.8	0.27	19	35.0	60.5	albedo: 0.126	MPC; JPL
2019 VD_{51}	2 November 2019	COIAS,Subaru Telescope (T09)	102	cubewano (cold)?	45.1	0.03	3	43.6	46.6	albedo: 0.152	MPC; JPL
2019 VD_{58}	2 November 2019	COIAS,Subaru Telescope (T09)	77	centaur	70.0	0.61	3	27.0	112.9	albedo: 0.058	MPC; JPL
2019 VE_{51}	1 November 2019	COIAS,Subaru Telescope (T09)	72	cubewano (hot)?	45.8	0.37	21	28.7	62.8	albedo: 0.079	MPC; JPL
2019 VH_{57}	2 November 2019	COIAS,Subaru Telescope (T09)	74	res · 4:7	43.6	0.12	9	38.4	48.8	albedo: 0.126	MPC; JPL
2019 VP_{53}	1 November 2019	COIAS,Subaru Telescope (T09)	84	cubewano (cold)?	43.3	0.07	3	40.1	46.4	albedo: 0.152	MPC; JPL
2019 VZ_{50}	2 November 2019	COIAS,Subaru Telescope (T09)	88	cubewano (hot)?	45.4	0.25	5	34.3	56.5	albedo: 0.079	MPC; JPL
2019 WA_{36}	29 November 2019	COIAS,Subaru Telescope (T09)	56	cubewano (hot)?	41.3	0.12	23	36.2	46.4	albedo: 0.079	MPC; JPL
2019 WL_{34}	29 November 2019	COIAS,Subaru Telescope (T09)	43	plutino	39.7	0.21	18	31.5	47.9	albedo: 0.074	MPC; JPL
2019 WV_{35}	29 November 2019	COIAS,Subaru Telescope (T09)	75	cubewano (hot)?	44.4	0.12	25	39.3	49.5	albedo: 0.079	MPC; JPL
2019 WW_{35}	29 November 2019	COIAS,Subaru Telescope (T09)	84	plutino	39.5	0.16	25	33.3	45.8	albedo: 0.074	MPC; JPL
2019 WZ_{35}	27 November 2019	COIAS,Subaru Telescope (T09)	101	SDO	89.3	0.56	34	39.6	138.9	albedo: 0.124	MPC; JPL
2019 YJ_{6}	30 December 2019	Pan-STARRS 1 (F51)	2.5	damocloid	37.2	0.93	22	2.6	71.8	albedo: 0.048	MPC; JPL

back to top
