= List of unnumbered trans-Neptunian objects: 2018 =

The following is a partial list of unnumbered trans-Neptunian objects for principal designations assigned within 2018. As of November 2026, it contains a total of 46 bodies. For more information see the description on the main page. Also see list for the previous and next year.

== 2018 ==
Designation	First Observed (discovered)		D (km)	Orbital description						Remarks	Refs
Designation	Date	Observer (Site)	D (km)	Class	a (AU)	e	i (°)	q (AU)	Q (AU)	Remarks	Refs
2018 AD_{39}	15 January 2018	Maunakea (568)	217	SDO	169.2	0.77	20	38.9	299.5	albedo: 0.124	MPC; JPL
2018 AG37	15 January 2018	Maunakea (568)	790	centaur	81.4	0.65	19	28.5	134.3	albedo: 0.058	MPC; JPL
2018 AH_{39}	15 January 2018	Maunakea (568)	133	other TNO	55.6	0.18	29	45.7	65.5	albedo: 0.13	MPC; JPL
2018 AK_{39}	15 January 2018	Maunakea (568)	277	centaur	51.7	0.46	15	28.0	75.4	albedo: 0.058	MPC; JPL
2018 AX_{18}	15 January 2018	Maunakea (568)	181	SDO	52.6	0.28	21	37.6	67.5	albedo: 0.124	MPC; JPL
2018 AY_{18}	15 January 2018	Maunakea (568)	125	SDO	65.3	0.38	15	40.4	90.3	albedo: 0.124	MPC; JPL
2018 AZ_{18}	15 January 2018	Maunakea (568)	109	SDO	55.2	0.27	16	40.3	70.1	albedo: 0.124	MPC; JPL
2018 DE_{4}	17 February 2018	Mt. Lemmon Survey (G96)	2.2	damocloid	31.5	0.92	82	2.4	60.5	albedo: 0.048	MPC; JPL
2018 DF_{4}	23 February 2018	Mt. Lemmon Survey (G96)	3	damocloid	92.1	0.98	68	1.6	182.6	albedo: 0.048	MPC; JPL
2018 FK_{76}	18 March 2018	COIAS,Subaru Telescope (T09)	103	twotino	47.8	0.15	2	40.7	55.0	albedo: 0.126	MPC; JPL
2018 FL_{73}	18 March 2018	COIAS,Subaru Telescope (T09)	138	cubewano (cold)?	45.0	0.13	4	39.4	50.7	albedo: 0.152	MPC; JPL
2018 FL_{76}	18 March 2018	COIAS,Subaru Telescope (T09)	105	plutino	39.5	0.09	14	36.1	43.0	albedo: 0.074	MPC; JPL
2018 FM_{76}	18 March 2018	COIAS,Subaru Telescope (T09)	95	cubewano (cold)?	45.4	0.10	3	41.0	49.8	albedo: 0.152	MPC; JPL
2018 FM_{78}	18 March 2018	COIAS,Subaru Telescope (T09)	130	cubewano (hot)?	42.4	0.11	5	38.0	46.9	albedo: 0.079	MPC; JPL
2018 FN_{80}	—	—	—	—	43.2	0.02	1.4	42.4	44.1	—	MPC; JPL
2018 FO_{76}	18 March 2018	COIAS,Subaru Telescope (T09)	172	cubewano (hot)?	42.1	0.13	29	36.6	47.5	albedo: 0.079	MPC; JPL
2018 FP_{76}	18 March 2018	COIAS,Subaru Telescope (T09)	97	cubewano (cold)?	42.5	0.03	4	41.5	43.6	albedo: 0.152	MPC; JPL
2018 FQ_{76}	18 March 2018	COIAS,Subaru Telescope (T09)	75	cubewano (cold)?	42.9	0.03	2	41.8	43.9	albedo: 0.152	MPC; JPL
2018 FX_{73}	18 March 2018	COIAS,Subaru Telescope (T09)	131	cubewano (cold)?	44.1	0.06	3	41.3	46.8	albedo: 0.152	MPC; JPL
2018 FY_{73}	18 March 2018	COIAS,Subaru Telescope (T09)	108	res · 3:5	42.5	0.18	4	35.0	49.9	albedo: 0.126	MPC; JPL
2018 GT_{12}	12 April 2018	Cerro Tololo Observatory, La Serena (807)	114	SDO	98.6	0.66	16	33.6	163.6	albedo: 0.124	MPC; JPL
2018 GT_{15}	12 April 2018	Cerro Tololo Observatory, La Serena (807)	112	other TNO	57.0	0.10	26	51.4	62.6	albedo: 0.13	MPC; JPL
2018 HK_{14}	24 April 2018	COIAS,Subaru Telescope (T09)	115	cubewano (cold)?	43.2	0.04	2	41.3	45.1	albedo: 0.152	MPC; JPL
2018 HL_{14}	24 April 2018	COIAS,Subaru Telescope (T09)	102	cubewano (cold)?	43.5	0.05	3	41.6	45.5	albedo: 0.152	MPC; JPL
2018 HM_{14}	24 April 2018	COIAS,Subaru Telescope (T09)	102	cubewano (cold)?	44.2	0.05	2	41.9	46.6	albedo: 0.152	MPC; JPL
2018 HS_{12}	24 April 2018	COIAS,Subaru Telescope (T09)	82	res · 3:5	42.2	0.19	15	34.2	50.3	albedo: 0.126	MPC; JPL
2018 HT_{14}	24 April 2018	COIAS,Subaru Telescope (T09)	105	other TNO	38.4	0.10	2	34.5	42.2	albedo: 0.13	MPC; JPL
2018 JT_{6}	10 May 2018	Cerro Tololo Observatory, La Serena (807)	161	other TNO	53.2	0.19	27	42.9	63.5	albedo: 0.13	MPC; JPL
2018 JU_{6}	11 May 2018	Cerro Tololo Observatory, La Serena (807)	157	SDO	51.5	0.25	6	38.5	64.6	albedo: 0.124	MPC; JPL
2018 JY_{15}	—	—	—	—	46.2	0.25	19	34.8	57.6	—	MPC; JPL
2018 KH_{3}	16 May 2018	Mt. Lemmon Survey (G96)	11	damocloid	89.4	0.96	47	3.7	175.2	albedo: 0.048	MPC; JPL
2018 MD_{47}	—	—	—	—	42.7	0.01	4	42.4	43.1	—	MPC; JPL
2018 ME_{47}	—	—	—	—	40.9	0.07	28	38.1	43.6	—	MPC; JPL
2018 MF_{13}	16 June 2018	DECam (W84)	68	res · 5:8	41.0	0.25	3	30.7	51.3	albedo: 0.126	MPC; JPL
2018 MG_{13}	16 June 2018	DECam (W84)	146	cubewano (hot)?	47.6	0.07	10	44.5	50.8	albedo: 0.079	MPC; JPL
2018 MP_{8}	16 June 2018	Pan-STARRS 1 (F51)	5	damocloid	324.1	0.99	68	3.8	644.3	albedo: 0.048	MPC; JPL
2018 SQ_{13}	21 September 2018	Mt. Lemmon Survey (G96)	5	damocloid	162.7	0.98	91	3.0	322.4	albedo: 0.048	MPC; JPL
2018 VG18	10 November 2018	Maunakea (568)	610	res · 2:9	81.9	0.53	24	38.9	125.0	albedo: 0.126	MPC; JPL
2018 VJ_{137}	8 November 2018	Maunakea (568)	165	SDO	91.5	0.59	19	37.6	145.3	albedo: 0.124	MPC; JPL
2018 VL_{203}	8 November 2018	COIAS,Subaru Telescope (T09)	90	centaur	43.6	0.87	19	5.6	81.7	albedo: 0.058	MPC; JPL
2018 VM_{35}	6 November 2018	Maunakea (568)	106	EDDO	306.8	0.86	9	44.6	569.0	albedo: 0.124	MPC; JPL
2018 VN_{137}	8 November 2018	Maunakea (568)	120	SDO	55.2	0.38	17	34.2	76.2	albedo: 0.124	MPC; JPL
2018 VN_{35}	10 November 2018	Maunakea (568)	111	SDO	85.1	0.59	25	34.5	135.6	albedo: 0.124	MPC; JPL
2018 VO_{137}	8 November 2018	Maunakea (568)	129	res · 2:5	55.6	0.19	39	45.2	65.9	albedo: 0.126	MPC; JPL
2018 VO_{35}	10 November 2018	Maunakea (568)	162	SDO	96.0	0.63	19	35.5	156.5	albedo: 0.124	MPC; JPL
2018 VP_{137}	8 November 2018	Maunakea (568)	109	SDO	55.6	0.38	9	34.2	76.9	albedo: 0.124	MPC; JPL

back to top
