= List of unnumbered trans-Neptunian objects: 2023 =

The following is a partial list of unnumbered trans-Neptunian objects for principal designations assigned within 2023. As of October 2026, it contains a total of 61 bodies. For more information see the description on the main page. Also see list for the previous and next year.

== 2023 ==
Designation	First Observed (discovered)		D (km)	Orbital description						Remarks	Refs
Designation	Date	Observer (Site)	D (km)	Class	a (AU)	e	i (°)	q (AU)	Q (AU)	Remarks	Refs
2023 BX_{21}	—	—	—	—	42.7	0.09	2	38.7	46.7	—	MPC · JPL
2023 BY_{21}	—	—	—	—	43.1	0.11	12	38.6	47.7	—	MPC · JPL
2023 DP_{5}	19 February 2023	Mt. Lemmon Survey (G96)	8	damocloid	92.0	0.95	118	4.8	179.1	albedo: 0.048	MPC · JPL
2023 DT_{6}	17 February 2023	Cerro Tololo-DECam (W84)	147	cubewano (hot)?	46.2	0.13	28	40.2	52.2	albedo: 0.079	MPC · JPL
2023 FA_{55}	21 March 2023	Maunakea (568)	146	cubewano (hot)?	44.3	0.14	7	38.2	50.3	albedo: 0.079	MPC · JPL
2023 FB_{55}	21 March 2023	Maunakea (568)	182	cubewano (cold)?	44.8	0.10	3	40.2	49.4	albedo: 0.152	MPC · JPL
2023 FC_{55}	21 March 2023	Maunakea (568)	157	SDO	72.2	0.50	23	36.5	107.9	albedo: 0.124	MPC · JPL
2023 FD_{55}	21 March 2023	Maunakea (568)	102	other TNO	52.9	0.23	9	40.7	65.1	albedo: 0.13	MPC · JPL
2023 FH_{57}	21 March 2023	D. J. Tholen (T09)	200	cubewano (hot)?	42.0	0.04	14	40.4	43.6	albedo: 0.079	MPC · JPL
2023 FH_{65}	21 March 2023	Subaru Telescope, Maunakea (T09)	90	other TNO	56.2	0.32	28	38.1	74.4	albedo: 0.13	MPC · JPL
2023 FJ_{57}	21 March 2023	D. J. Tholen (T09)	150	plutino	39.7	0.13	7	34.6	44.7	albedo: 0.074	MPC · JPL
2023 FJ_{65}	21 March 2023	Subaru Telescope, Maunakea (T09)	100	other TNO	46.1	0.29	2	32.9	59.3	albedo: 0.13	MPC · JPL
2023 FK_{57}	21 March 2023	D. J. Tholen (T09)	138	cubewano (hot)?	43.9	0.13	28	38.5	49.4	albedo: 0.079	MPC · JPL
2023 FK_{61}	21 March 2023	Subaru Telescope, Maunakea (T09)	116	cubewano (cold)?	43.2	0.09	4	39.2	47.2	albedo: 0.152	MPC · JPL
2023 FK_{65}	21 March 2023	Subaru Telescope, Maunakea (T09)	130	SDO	67.1	0.46	19	36.3	97.9	albedo: 0.124	MPC · JPL
2023 FL_{57}	21 March 2023	D. J. Tholen (T09)	174	cubewano (cold)?	44.7	0.06	3	42.2	47.3	albedo: 0.152	MPC · JPL
2023 FL_{61}	21 March 2023	Subaru Telescope, Maunakea (T09)	167	cubewano (hot)?	43.7	0.10	18	39.6	47.9	albedo: 0.079	MPC · JPL
2023 FM_{61}	21 March 2023	Subaru Telescope, Maunakea (T09)	162	cubewano (hot)?	47.1	0.11	18	42.0	52.2	albedo: 0.079	MPC · JPL
2023 FN_{57}	21 March 2023	D. J. Tholen (T09)	113	cubewano (cold)?	43.8	0.09	4	40.0	47.6	albedo: 0.152	MPC · JPL
2023 FN_{61}	21 March 2023	Subaru Telescope, Maunakea (T09)	194	cubewano (hot)?	44.1	0.14	9	37.7	50.4	albedo: 0.079	MPC · JPL
2023 FO_{61}	21 March 2023	Subaru Telescope, Maunakea (T09)	199	cubewano (hot)?	46.3	0.11	5	41.4	51.2	albedo: 0.079	MPC · JPL
2023 FP_{61}	21 March 2023	Subaru Telescope, Maunakea (T09)	119	cubewano (cold)?	42.2	0.09	2	38.3	46.0	albedo: 0.152	MPC · JPL
2023 FQ_{61}	21 March 2023	Subaru Telescope, Maunakea (T09)	206	centaur	30.1	0.54	8	13.8	46.5	albedo: 0.058	MPC · JPL
2023 FR_{54}	21 March 2023	Maunakea (568)	268	cubewano (hot)?	42.7	0.03	11	41.5	44.0	albedo: 0.079	MPC · JPL
2023 FS_{54}	21 March 2023	Maunakea (568)	318	SDO	54.3	0.30	4	38.0	70.6	albedo: 0.124	MPC · JPL
2023 FT_{54}	21 March 2023	Maunakea (568)	139	cubewano (hot)?	45.2	0.25	10	34.0	56.3	albedo: 0.079	MPC · JPL
2023 FU_{54}	21 March 2023	Maunakea (568)	310	centaur	44.0	0.50	34	22.0	65.9	albedo: 0.058	MPC · JPL
2023 FV_{47}	18 March 2023	Korea Microlensing Telescope Network-CTIO (W93)	134	other TNO	45.0	0.05	3	42.7	47.3	albedo: 0.13	MPC · JPL
2023 FW_{54}	21 March 2023	Maunakea (568)	157	cubewano (cold)?	45.1	0.15	3	38.4	51.9	albedo: 0.152	MPC · JPL
2023 FX_{54}	21 March 2023	Maunakea (568)	161	cubewano (cold)?	44.3	0.05	2	41.9	46.7	albedo: 0.152	MPC · JPL
2023 FY_{54}	21 March 2023	Maunakea (568)	113	SDO	71.9	0.52	5	34.3	109.5	albedo: 0.124	MPC · JPL
2023 FZ_{54}	21 March 2023	Maunakea (568)	162	cubewano (hot)?	42.3	0.19	5	34.4	50.3	albedo: 0.079	MPC · JPL
2023 GJ_{12}	12 April 2023	Cerro Tololo-DECam (W84)	113	SDO	132.4	0.70	28	39.3	225.6	albedo: 0.124	MPC · JPL
2023 HA_{36}	22 April 2023	Las Campanas Observatory (304)	229	cubewano (hot)?	43.1	0.17	13	35.9	50.3	albedo: 0.079	MPC · JPL
2023 KQ14	16 May 2023	D. J. Tholen (T09)	167	SDO	247.5	0.73	11	65.9	429.1	albedo: 0.124	MPC · JPL
2023 LG_{7}	12 June 2023	Cerro Tololo-DECam (W84)	—	—	56.0	0.36	11	35.9	76.2	—	MPC · JPL
2023 PA_{5}	13 August 2023	D. J. Tholen (T09)	107	res · 4:5	34.9	0.07	7	32.4	37.4	albedo: 0.126	MPC · JPL
2023 PB_{5}	13 August 2023	D. J. Tholen (T09)	135	res · 3:5	42.2	0.10	26	38.0	46.4	albedo: 0.126	MPC · JPL
2023 PC_{5}	13 August 2023	D. J. Tholen (T09)	83	other TNO	47.7	0.37	8	30.1	65.3	albedo: 0.13	MPC · JPL
2023 PD_{5}	13 August 2023	D. J. Tholen (T09)	152	plutino	39.2	0.26	6	29.2	49.2	albedo: 0.074	MPC · JPL
2023 PE_{5}	13 August 2023	D. J. Tholen (T09)	103	plutino	39.4	0.28	9	28.5	50.4	albedo: 0.074	MPC · JPL
2023 PF_{5}	13 August 2023	D. J. Tholen (T09)	115	SDO	94.1	0.67	12	31.6	156.6	albedo: 0.124	MPC · JPL
2023 PG_{5}	13 August 2023	D. J. Tholen (T09)	121	SDO	116.1	0.65	31	40.9	191.3	albedo: 0.124	MPC · JPL
2023 PH_{5}	13 August 2023	D. J. Tholen (T09)	119	SDO	60.3	0.41	16	35.9	84.7	albedo: 0.124	MPC · JPL
2023 PJ_{5}	13 August 2023	D. J. Tholen (T09)	89	twotino	47.5	0.33	3	31.9	63.1	albedo: 0.126	MPC · JPL
2023 PK_{5}	13 August 2023	D. J. Tholen (T09)	119	res · 3:5	42.1	0.12	9	37.1	47.2	albedo: 0.126	MPC · JPL
2023 PL_{5}	13 August 2023	D. J. Tholen (T09)	183	cubewano (hot)?	44.7	0.16	9	37.6	51.9	albedo: 0.079	MPC · JPL
2023 PM_{5}	13 August 2023	D. J. Tholen (T09)	108	other TNO	37.9	0.03	22	36.7	39.0	albedo: 0.13	MPC · JPL
2023 PN_{5}	13 August 2023	D. J. Tholen (T09)	163	other TNO	52.5	0.11	25	47.0	58.0	albedo: 0.13	MPC · JPL
2023 PO_{5}	13 August 2023	D. J. Tholen (T09)	209	cubewano (cold)?	44.0	0.04	3	42.1	45.8	albedo: 0.152	MPC · JPL
2023 PP_{5}	13 August 2023	D. J. Tholen (T09)	104	other TNO	52.6	0.09	9	47.7	57.5	albedo: 0.13	MPC · JPL
2023 PW_{4}	13 August 2023	D. J. Tholen (T09)	233	SDO	120.0	0.69	22	36.8	203.1	albedo: 0.124	MPC · JPL
2023 PX_{4}	13 August 2023	D. J. Tholen (T09)	185	SDO	74.4	0.58	5	31.4	117.4	albedo: 0.124	MPC · JPL
2023 PY_{4}	13 August 2023	D. J. Tholen (T09)	103	centaur	183.5	0.89	9	20.6	346.3	albedo: 0.058	MPC · JPL
2023 PZ_{4}	13 August 2023	D. J. Tholen (T09)	140	res · 4:7	43.5	0.27	7	31.7	55.3	albedo: 0.126	MPC · JPL
2023 QE_{7}	20 August 2023	Pan-STARRS 1 (F51)	2.5	damocloid	79.3	0.96	103	3.1	155.5	albedo: 0.048	MPC · JPL
2023 RN_{167}	8 September 2023	Pan-STARRS 2 (F52)	13	centaur	108.0	0.95	122	5.2	210.8	albedo: 0.058	MPC · JPL
2023 SO_{7}	18 September 2023	Pan-STARRS 1 (F51)	160	centaur	69.7	0.72	97	19.6	119.8	albedo: 0.058	MPC · JPL
2023 TD_{38}	15 October 2023	Pan-STARRS 1 (F51)	4	damocloid	58.0	0.95	159	3.0	113.1	albedo: 0.048	MPC · JPL
2023 UJ_{31}	23 October 2023	Pan-STARRS 1 (F51)	38	centaur	73.0	0.82	32	13.4	132.6	albedo: 0.058	MPC · JPL
2023 VG_{2}	1 November 2023	Pan-STARRS 1 (F51)	12	damocloid	30.4	0.89	43	3.5	57.3	albedo: 0.048	MPC · JPL

back to top
