= List of unnumbered trans-Neptunian objects: 2022 =

The following is a partial list of unnumbered trans-Neptunian objects for principal designations assigned within 2022. As of October 2026, it contains a total of 121 bodies. For more information see the description on the main page. Also see list for the previous and next year.

== 2022 ==
Designation	First Observed (discovered)		D (km)	Orbital description						Remarks	Refs
Designation	Date	Observer (Site)	D (km)	Class	a (AU)	e	i (°)	q (AU)	Q (AU)	Remarks	Refs
2022 AB_{8}	8 January 2022	Pan-STARRS 2 (F52)	2.9	damocloid	79.6	0.98	75	1.7	157.6	albedo: 0.048	MPC · JPL
2022 AZ_{9}	4 January 2022	DECam (W84)	11	damocloid	51.1	0.91	73	4.9	97.4	albedo: 0.048	MPC · JPL
2022 FA_{7}	30 March 2022	Korea Microlensing Telescope Network-CTIO (W93)	176	other TNO	43.6	0.28	15	31.3	55.9	albedo: 0.13	MPC · JPL
2022 FG_{12}	26 March 2022	Korea Microlensing Telescope Network-CTIO (W93)	110	cubewano (hot)	41.6	0.14	21	35.7	47.4	albedo: 0.079	MPC · JPL
2022 FH_{9}	26 March 2022	Korea Microlensing Telescope Network-CTIO (W93)	87	res · 4:5	35.0	0.06	6	32.9	37.2	albedo: 0.126	MPC · JPL
2022 FK_{12}	26 March 2022	Korea Microlensing Telescope Network-CTIO (W93)	162	cubewano (hot)?	47.6	0.02	24	46.7	48.5	albedo: 0.079	MPC · JPL
2022 FM_{12}	26 March 2022	Korea Microlensing Telescope Network-CTIO (W93)	114	cubewano (hot)?	46.7	0.21	6	37.1	56.3	albedo: 0.079	MPC · JPL
2022 FN_{12}	26 March 2022	Korea Microlensing Telescope Network-CTIO (W93)	101	cubewano (cold)?	42.5	0.02	1	41.5	43.5	albedo: 0.152	MPC · JPL
2022 FR_{6}	26 March 2022	Korea Microlensing Telescope Network-CTIO (W93)	154	cubewano (hot)?	44.2	0.07	7	41.2	47.2	albedo: 0.079	MPC · JPL
2022 GG_{7}	3 April 2022	Korea Microlensing Telescope Network-CTIO (W93)	124	cubewano (cold)	43.6	0.04	2	41.8	45.3	albedo: 0.152	MPC · JPL
2022 GN_{14}	7 April 2022	Korea Microlensing Telescope Network-CTIO (W93)	127	SDO	92.3	0.57	8	39.9	144.8	albedo: 0.124	MPC · JPL
2022 GP_{4}	7 April 2022	Korea Microlensing Telescope Network-CTIO (W93)	111	cubewano (hot)?	44.3	0.16	9	37.2	51.4	albedo: 0.079	MPC · JPL
2022 GU	1 April 2022	Mt. Lemmon Survey (G96)	3	damocloid	36.5	0.95	117	1.8	71.2	albedo: 0.048	MPC · JPL
2022 GV_{6}	3 April 2022	Korea Microlensing Telescope Network-CTIO (W93)	92	SDO	137.5	0.72	14	38.2	236.8	albedo: 0.124	MPC · JPL
2022 GY_{3}	3 April 2022	Korea Microlensing Telescope Network-CTIO (W93)	125	res · 3:5	42.3	0.10	2	38.0	46.6	albedo: 0.126	MPC · JPL
2022 GZ_{3}	3 April 2022	Korea Microlensing Telescope Network-CTIO (W93)	159	cubewano (hot)	41.5	0.03	16	40.2	42.8	albedo: 0.079	MPC · JPL
2022 HB_{5}	23 April 2022	Pan-STARRS 2 (F52)	3	damocloid	35.9	0.90	147	3.5	68.3	albedo: 0.048	MPC · JPL
2022 HE_{1}	22 April 2022	Korea Microlensing Telescope Network-CTIO (W93)	149	cubewano (cold)	43.0	0.08	1	39.7	46.2	albedo: 0.152	MPC · JPL
2022 HK_{5}	22 April 2022	Korea Microlensing Telescope Network-CTIO (W93)	96	centaur	108.9	0.74	2	28.7	189.2	albedo: 0.058	MPC · JPL
2022 HQ_{19}	25 April 2022	Cerro Tololo Observatory, La Serena (807)	189	res · 2:7	69.2	0.55	20	31.2	107.2	albedo: 0.126	MPC · JPL
2022 HW_{5}	24 April 2022	Korea Microlensing Telescope Network-CTIO (W93)	157	plutino?	42.2	0.02	2	41.5	43.0	albedo: 0.074	MPC · JPL
2022 LA_{14}	2 June 2022	New Horizons KBO Search (266)	50	cubewano (cold)?	47.8	0.10	2	43.0	52.6	albedo: 0.152	MPC · JPL
2022 LA_{15}	2 June 2022	New Horizons KBO Search (266)	54	cubewano (hot)?	41.8	0.08	20	38.5	45.1	albedo: 0.079	MPC · JPL
2022 LA_{16}	2 June 2022	New Horizons KBO Search (266)	33	cubewano (cold)?	43.5	0.09	1	39.6	47.5	albedo: 0.152	MPC · JPL
2022 LA_{17}	3 June 2022	New Horizons KBO Search (266)	48	cubewano (cold)?	45.6	0.11	2	40.6	50.6	albedo: 0.152	MPC · JPL
2022 LB_{14}	2 June 2022	New Horizons KBO Search (266)	72	cubewano (cold)?	42.7	0.06	2	39.9	45.4	albedo: 0.152	MPC · JPL
2022 LB_{15}	2 June 2022	New Horizons KBO Search (266)	39	plutino?	39.5	0.19	6	31.9	47.1	albedo: 0.074	MPC · JPL
2022 LB_{16}	2 June 2022	New Horizons KBO Search (266)	39	other TNO	35.3	0.10	7	31.9	38.6	albedo: 0.13	MPC · JPL
2022 LB_{17}	2 June 2022	New Horizons KBO Search (266)	43	plutino?	39.1	0.11	4	34.8	43.4	albedo: 0.074	MPC · JPL
2022 LC_{14}	2 June 2022	New Horizons KBO Search (266)	28	cubewano (cold)?	43.9	0.21	2	34.7	53.0	albedo: 0.152	MPC · JPL
2022 LC_{15}	2 June 2022	New Horizons KBO Search (266)	37	other TNO	47.6	0.22	2	37.1	58.2	albedo: 0.13	MPC · JPL
2022 LC_{16}	2 June 2022	New Horizons KBO Search (266)	52	other TNO	35.3	0.09	9	31.9	38.6	albedo: 0.13	MPC · JPL
2022 LD_{14}	2 June 2022	New Horizons KBO Search (266)	74	cubewano (cold)?	45.7	0.08	2	42.1	49.3	albedo: 0.152	MPC · JPL
2022 LD_{15}	2 June 2022	New Horizons KBO Search (266)	47	cubewano (cold)?	47.6	0.09	3	43.2	51.9	albedo: 0.152	MPC · JPL
2022 LD_{16}	3 June 2022	New Horizons KBO Search (266)	54	cubewano (cold)?	43.1	0.10	2	39.0	47.3	albedo: 0.152	MPC · JPL
2022 LE_{14}	2 June 2022	New Horizons KBO Search (266)	50	cubewano (cold)?	43.3	0.11	1	38.4	48.1	albedo: 0.152	MPC · JPL
2022 LE_{15}	2 June 2022	New Horizons KBO Search (266)	25	other TNO	38.3	0.10	25	34.7	41.9	albedo: 0.13	MPC · JPL
2022 LE_{16}	2 June 2022	New Horizons KBO Search (266)	53	plutino	39.2	0.22	11	30.4	47.9	albedo: 0.074	MPC · JPL
2022 LE_{17}	2 June 2022	New Horizons KBO Search (266)	66	cubewano (cold)?	47.5	0.09	1	43.0	52.0	albedo: 0.152	MPC · JPL
2022 LF_{14}	2 June 2022	New Horizons KBO Search (266)	43	other TNO	44.8	0.19	13	36.1	53.5	albedo: 0.13	MPC · JPL
2022 LF_{15}	2 June 2022	New Horizons KBO Search (266)	32	other TNO	45.9	0.10	5	41.6	50.3	albedo: 0.13	MPC · JPL
2022 LF_{16}	2 June 2022	New Horizons KBO Search (266)	200	cubewano (hot)?	46.2	0.11	26	41.3	51.1	albedo: 0.079	MPC · JPL
2022 LG_{14}	2 June 2022	New Horizons KBO Search (266)	41	SDO	84.1	0.59	10	34.6	133.6	albedo: 0.124	MPC · JPL
2022 LG_{15}	2 June 2022	New Horizons KBO Search (266)	59	cubewano (cold)?	44.7	0.08	2	41.0	48.4	albedo: 0.152	MPC · JPL
2022 LG_{16}	2 June 2022	New Horizons KBO Search (266)	65	centaur	94.3	0.73	30	25.2	163.3	albedo: 0.058	MPC · JPL
2022 LH_{14}	2 June 2022	New Horizons KBO Search (266)	77	cubewano (hot)?	45.3	0.10	6	40.7	49.9	albedo: 0.079	MPC · JPL
2022 LH_{15}	2 June 2022	New Horizons KBO Search (266)	183	cubewano (cold)?	45.3	0.05	1	43.0	47.6	albedo: 0.152	MPC · JPL
2022 LH_{16}	2 June 2022	New Horizons KBO Search (266)	95	cubewano (cold)?	48.7	0.16	1	41.1	56.2	albedo: 0.152	MPC · JPL
2022 LJ_{14}	2 June 2022	New Horizons KBO Search (266)	24	cubewano (cold)?	44.3	0.20	2	35.5	53.1	albedo: 0.152	MPC · JPL
2022 LJ_{15}	2 June 2022	New Horizons KBO Search (266)	74	cubewano (cold)?	44.7	0.04	3	43.0	46.4	albedo: 0.152	MPC · JPL
2022 LJ_{16}	2 June 2022	New Horizons KBO Search (266)	42	centaur	60.5	0.61	11	23.5	97.5	albedo: 0.058	MPC · JPL
2022 LK_{14}	2 June 2022	New Horizons KBO Search (266)	97	SDO	144.1	0.67	33	47.2	241.0	albedo: 0.124	MPC · JPL
2022 LK_{15}	2 June 2022	New Horizons KBO Search (266)	76	cubewano (cold)?	45.9	0.10	3	41.5	50.3	albedo: 0.152	MPC · JPL
2022 LK_{16}	2 June 2022	New Horizons KBO Search (266)	151	SDO	50.9	0.31	31	35.2	66.5	albedo: 0.124	MPC · JPL
2022 LL_{14}	2 June 2022	New Horizons KBO Search (266)	169	cubewano (hot)?	43.7	0.18	9	35.8	51.6	albedo: 0.079	MPC · JPL
2022 LL_{15}	2 June 2022	New Horizons KBO Search (266)	45	cubewano (cold)?	43.7	0.06	2	41.0	46.4	albedo: 0.152	MPC · JPL
2022 LL_{16}	2 June 2022	New Horizons KBO Search (266)	46	other TNO	38.1	0.09	1	34.6	41.6	albedo: 0.13	MPC · JPL
2022 LM_{14}	2 June 2022	New Horizons KBO Search (266)	97	cubewano (cold)?	46.5	0.04	3	44.9	48.1	albedo: 0.152	MPC · JPL
2022 LM_{15}	2 June 2022	New Horizons KBO Search (266)	49	cubewano (cold)?	45.5	0.09	4	41.3	49.7	albedo: 0.152	MPC · JPL
2022 LM_{16}	2 June 2022	New Horizons KBO Search (266)	43	cubewano (cold)?	45.9	0.17	4	38.2	53.5	albedo: 0.152	MPC · JPL
2022 LN_{14}	2 June 2022	New Horizons KBO Search (266)	61	SDO	50.5	0.31	2	34.9	66.1	albedo: 0.124	MPC · JPL
2022 LN_{15}	2 June 2022	New Horizons KBO Search (266)	66	other TNO	35.1	0.10	6	31.5	38.8	albedo: 0.13	MPC · JPL
2022 LN_{16}	2 June 2022	New Horizons KBO Search (266)	38	cubewano (hot)?	41.2	0.19	7	33.2	49.2	albedo: 0.079	MPC · JPL
2022 LO_{14}	2 June 2022	New Horizons KBO Search (266)	137	centaur	58.6	0.59	1	24.1	93.2	albedo: 0.058	MPC · JPL
2022 LO_{15}	2 June 2022	New Horizons KBO Search (266)	67	other TNO	35.2	0.11	7	31.4	39.1	albedo: 0.13	MPC · JPL
2022 LO_{16}	2 June 2022	New Horizons KBO Search (266)	36	SDO	64.9	0.49	4	33.4	96.4	albedo: 0.124	MPC · JPL
2022 LO_{17}	2 June 2022	New Horizons KBO Search (266)	89	cubewano (cold)?	43.9	0.06	2	41.5	46.3	albedo: 0.152	MPC · JPL
2022 LP_{14}	2 June 2022	New Horizons KBO Search (266)	43	cubewano (cold)?	43.0	0.10	1	38.9	47.1	albedo: 0.152	MPC · JPL
2022 LP_{15}	2 June 2022	New Horizons KBO Search (266)	32	res · 3:4	36.2	0.10	4	32.5	39.9	albedo: 0.126	MPC · JPL
2022 LP_{16}	2 June 2022	New Horizons KBO Search (266)	153	cubewano (cold)?	43.0	0.10	3	38.6	47.4	albedo: 0.152	MPC · JPL
2022 LP_{17}	3 June 2022	New Horizons KBO Search (266)	39	SDO	71.0	0.39	2	43.5	98.4	albedo: 0.124	MPC · JPL
2022 LQ_{14}	2 June 2022	New Horizons KBO Search (266)	70	other TNO	36.9	0.11	9	33.0	40.8	albedo: 0.13	MPC · JPL
2022 LQ_{15}	2 June 2022	New Horizons KBO Search (266)	38	cubewano (cold)?	40.2	0.11	3	35.8	44.6	albedo: 0.152	MPC · JPL
2022 LQ_{16}	2 June 2022	New Horizons KBO Search (266)	127	SDO	64.5	0.20	8	51.7	77.2	albedo: 0.124	MPC · JPL
2022 LR_{14}	2 June 2022	New Horizons KBO Search (266)	46	cubewano (cold)?	43.8	0.06	5	41.2	46.4	albedo: 0.152	MPC · JPL
2022 LR_{15}	3 June 2022	New Horizons KBO Search (266)	87	SDO	64.7	0.11	18	57.8	71.5	albedo: 0.124	MPC · JPL
2022 LR_{16}	2 June 2022	New Horizons KBO Search (266)	48	cubewano (cold)?	42.5	0.06	5	39.9	45.2	albedo: 0.152	MPC · JPL
2022 LS_{14}	2 June 2022	New Horizons KBO Search (266)	68	cubewano (cold)?	46.4	0.17	1	38.6	54.2	albedo: 0.152	MPC · JPL
2022 LS_{15}	2 June 2022	New Horizons KBO Search (266)	46	cubewano (cold)?	49.0	0.09	1	44.5	53.5	albedo: 0.152	MPC · JPL
2022 LS_{16}	2 June 2022	New Horizons KBO Search (266)	220	SDO	66.4	0.28	25	48.0	84.8	albedo: 0.124	MPC · JPL
2022 LT_{14}	2 June 2022	New Horizons KBO Search (266)	69	SDO	68.2	0.09	41	61.9	74.6	albedo: 0.124	MPC · JPL
2022 LT_{15}	2 June 2022	New Horizons KBO Search (266)	141	cubewano (hot)?	43.2	0.02	5	42.3	44.1	albedo: 0.079	MPC · JPL
2022 LT_{16}	3 June 2022	New Horizons KBO Search (266)	109	SDO	75.0	0.09	5	68.1	81.8	albedo: 0.124	MPC · JPL
2022 LU_{14}	2 June 2022	New Horizons KBO Search (266)	47	other TNO	36.7	0.10	1	32.9	40.5	albedo: 0.13	MPC · JPL
2022 LU_{15}	2 June 2022	New Horizons KBO Search (266)	43	other TNO	37.9	0.10	7	34.0	41.7	albedo: 0.13	MPC · JPL
2022 LU_{16}	3 June 2022	New Horizons KBO Search (266)	111	SDO	69.8	0.09	10	63.4	76.3	albedo: 0.124	MPC · JPL
2022 LV_{13}	2 June 2022	New Horizons KBO Search (266)	105	plutino?	39.2	0.10	1	35.1	43.3	albedo: 0.074	MPC · JPL
2022 LV_{14}	2 June 2022	New Horizons KBO Search (266)	47	SDO	85.9	0.50	1	43.1	128.7	albedo: 0.124	MPC · JPL
2022 LV_{15}	2 June 2022	New Horizons KBO Search (266)	35	cubewano (cold)?	44.5	0.15	3	38.1	51.0	albedo: 0.152	MPC · JPL
2022 LV_{16}	2 June 2022	New Horizons KBO Search (266)	97	cubewano (cold)?	41.2	0.11	1	36.7	45.7	albedo: 0.152	MPC · JPL
2022 LW_{13}	2 June 2022	New Horizons KBO Search (266)	53	plutino	39.2	0.19	12	31.9	46.4	albedo: 0.074	MPC · JPL
2022 LW_{14}	2 June 2022	New Horizons KBO Search (266)	66	cubewano (cold)?	45.6	0.19	1	37.0	54.2	albedo: 0.152	MPC · JPL
2022 LW_{15}	3 June 2022	New Horizons KBO Search (266)	61	other TNO	35.6	0.10	15	31.9	39.3	albedo: 0.13	MPC · JPL
2022 LW_{16}	2 June 2022	New Horizons KBO Search (266)	30	cubewano (cold)?	44.3	0.18	2	36.3	52.4	albedo: 0.152	MPC · JPL
2022 LX_{13}	2 June 2022	New Horizons KBO Search (266)	111	cubewano (cold)?	48.8	0.09	2	44.4	53.3	albedo: 0.152	MPC · JPL
2022 LX_{14}	2 June 2022	New Horizons KBO Search (266)	90	centaur	116.0	0.82	2	21.4	210.5	albedo: 0.058	MPC · JPL
2022 LX_{15}	3 June 2022	New Horizons KBO Search (266)	154	SDO	67.8	0.11	21	60.4	75.3	albedo: 0.124	MPC · JPL
2022 LX_{16}	3 June 2022	New Horizons KBO Search (266)	94	cubewano (cold)?	46.9	0.07	5	43.5	50.3	albedo: 0.152	MPC · JPL
2022 LY_{13}	2 June 2022	New Horizons KBO Search (266)	55	plutino	39.4	0.14	14	33.8	45.1	albedo: 0.074	MPC · JPL
2022 LY_{14}	2 June 2022	New Horizons KBO Search (266)	33	cubewano (cold)?	45.0	0.14	2	38.9	51.1	albedo: 0.152	MPC · JPL
2022 LY_{15}	3 June 2022	New Horizons KBO Search (266)	164	SDO	64.2	0.14	15	55.5	72.9	albedo: 0.124	MPC · JPL
2022 LY_{16}	3 June 2022	New Horizons KBO Search (266)	35	cubewano (cold)?	44.7	0.07	2	41.7	47.7	albedo: 0.152	MPC · JPL
2022 LZ_{13}	2 June 2022	New Horizons KBO Search (266)	58	cubewano (cold)?	47.9	0.10	1	43.4	52.5	albedo: 0.152	MPC · JPL
2022 LZ_{15}	2 June 2022	New Horizons KBO Search (266)	52	twotino	47.6	0.19	4	38.6	56.6	albedo: 0.126	MPC · JPL
2022 LZ_{16}	3 June 2022	New Horizons KBO Search (266)	45	SDO	45.0	0.09	3	40.8	49.1	albedo: 0.124	MPC · JPL
2022 OC_{21}	29 July 2022	Pan-STARRS 2 (F52)	3	damocloid	68.1	0.95	93	3.3	132.9	albedo: 0.048	MPC · JPL
2022 QD_{261}	30 August 2022	Cerro Tololo Observatory, La Serena (807)	212	cubewano (cold)?	46.5	0.17	5	38.8	54.2	albedo: 0.152	MPC · JPL
2022 QE_{261}	30 August 2022	Cerro Tololo Observatory, La Serena (807)	280	cubewano (hot)	45.7	0.12	7	40.2	51.2	albedo: 0.079	MPC · JPL
2022 QF_{261}	30 August 2022	Cerro Tololo Observatory, La Serena (807)	327	SDO	56.0	0.34	9	36.8	75.2	albedo: 0.124	MPC · JPL
2022 QR_{264}	30 August 2022	Cerro Tololo Observatory, La Serena (807)	160	SDO	82.4	0.61	7	32.5	132.3	albedo: 0.124	MPC · JPL
2022 QU_{62}	25 August 2022	Korea Microlensing Telescope Network-CTIO (W93)	84	SDO	55.3	0.43	21	31.6	79.1	albedo: 0.124	MPC · JPL
2022 QV_{62}	25 August 2022	Korea Microlensing Telescope Network-CTIO (W93)	58	SDO	110.2	0.70	16	32.6	187.7	albedo: 0.124	MPC · JPL
2022 QY_{7}	25 August 2022	Korea Microlensing Telescope Network-CTIO (W93)	229	centaur	32.9	0.10	16	29.4	36.3	albedo: 0.058	MPC · JPL
2022 RW_{88}	1 September 2022	Cerro Tololo Observatory, La Serena (807)	147	SDO	60.3	0.42	28	35.0	85.5	albedo: 0.124	MPC · JPL
2022 UD_{146}	29 October 2022	Maunakea (568)	133	other TNO	47.0	0.25	7	35.3	58.7	albedo: 0.13	MPC · JPL
2022 UN_{10}	25 October 2022	Kitt Peak-Bok (V00)	20	centaur	34.2	0.68	8	10.8	57.6	albedo: 0.058	MPC · JPL
2022 UX_{172}	29 October 2022	Subaru Telescope, Maunakea (T09)	132	cubewano (cold)?	41.6	0.10	1	37.3	46.0	albedo: 0.152	MPC · JPL
2022 UY_{172}	29 October 2022	Subaru Telescope, Maunakea (T09)	152	other TNO	63.3	0.10	18	56.7	69.8	albedo: 0.13	MPC · JPL
2022 UZ_{172}	29 October 2022	Subaru Telescope, Maunakea (T09)	216	other TNO	53.1	0.10	12	47.7	58.5	albedo: 0.13	MPC · JPL
2022 WV_{24}	28 November 2022	Lowell Discovery Telescope (G37)	141	centaur	32.1	0.10	6	28.8	35.5	albedo: 0.058	MPC · JPL
2022 WW_{24}	28 November 2022	Lowell Discovery Telescope (G37)	118	other TNO	37.3	0.10	18	33.6	41.1	albedo: 0.13	MPC · JPL

back to top
