= Tourtellotte =

Tourtellotte is a surname. Notable people with the surname include:

- John E. Tourtellotte (1869–1939), American architect
- Suzanne W. Tourtellotte (1945–2013), American astronomer
