= List of minor planets: 778001–779000 =

The following is a partial list of minor planets, running from minor-planet number 778001 through 779000, inclusive. The primary data for this and other partial lists is based on JPL's "Small-Body Orbital Elements" and data available from the Minor Planet Center. Critical list information is also provided by the MPC, unless otherwise specified from Lowell Observatory. A detailed description of the table's columns and additional sources are given on the main page including a complete list of every page in this series, and a statistical break-up on the dynamical classification of minor planets.

Also see the summary list of all named bodies in numerical and alphabetical order, and the corresponding naming citations for the number range of this particular list. New namings may only be added to this list after official publication, as the preannouncement of names is condemned by the Working Group for Small Bodies Nomenclature of the International Astronomical Union.

Near-Earth obj.	MBA (inner)	MBA (outer)	Centaur
Mars-crosser	MBA (middle)	Jupiter trojan	Trans-Neptunian obj.
Unclassified

== 778001–778100 ==
Designation			Discovery			Properties		Ref
Permanent	Provisional	Named after	Date	Site	Discoverer(s)	Category	Diam.	Ref
778001	2009 ST_{402}	—	September 26, 2009	Kitt Peak	Spacewatch	·	1.4 km	MPC · JPL
778002	2009 SZ_{402}	—	September 20, 2009	Mount Lemmon	Mount Lemmon Survey	L4	5.1 km	MPC · JPL
778003	2009 SM_{404}	—	September 20, 2009	Kitt Peak	Spacewatch	·	2.6 km	MPC · JPL
778004	2009 SR_{405}	—	September 16, 2009	Kitt Peak	Spacewatch	L4	5.9 km	MPC · JPL
778005	2009 SB_{406}	—	September 30, 2009	Mount Lemmon	Mount Lemmon Survey	·	2.1 km	MPC · JPL
778006	2009 SM_{406}	—	September 20, 2009	Kitt Peak	Spacewatch	·	2.3 km	MPC · JPL
778007	2009 SF_{408}	—	September 21, 2009	Mount Lemmon	Mount Lemmon Survey	·	2.1 km	MPC · JPL
778008	2009 SO_{408}	—	September 24, 2009	Mount Lemmon	Mount Lemmon Survey	·	2.1 km	MPC · JPL
778009	2009 SV_{408}	—	September 16, 2009	Kitt Peak	Spacewatch	·	890 m	MPC · JPL
778010	2009 SX_{408}	—	September 19, 2009	Kitt Peak	Spacewatch	KOR	1.0 km	MPC · JPL
778011	2009 SE_{409}	—	September 16, 2009	Mount Lemmon	Mount Lemmon Survey	·	2.7 km	MPC · JPL
778012	2009 SA_{410}	—	September 28, 2009	Mount Lemmon	Mount Lemmon Survey	EOS	1.4 km	MPC · JPL
778013	2009 SV_{411}	—	September 23, 2009	Mount Lemmon	Mount Lemmon Survey	·	1.7 km	MPC · JPL
778014	2009 SN_{413}	—	September 24, 2009	Mount Lemmon	Mount Lemmon Survey	·	2.3 km	MPC · JPL
778015	2009 SV_{413}	—	September 22, 2009	Mount Lemmon	Mount Lemmon Survey	ADE	1.5 km	MPC · JPL
778016	2009 SX_{413}	—	February 6, 2002	Kitt Peak	Deep Ecliptic Survey	·	1.2 km	MPC · JPL
778017	2009 SO_{414}	—	September 29, 2009	Mount Lemmon	Mount Lemmon Survey	·	1.6 km	MPC · JPL
778018	2009 SP_{414}	—	September 19, 2009	Kitt Peak	Spacewatch	L4	6.3 km	MPC · JPL
778019	2009 SX_{414}	—	September 22, 2009	Kitt Peak	Spacewatch	·	1.2 km	MPC · JPL
778020	2009 SY_{414}	—	September 26, 2009	Kitt Peak	Spacewatch	·	1.1 km	MPC · JPL
778021	2009 SA_{415}	—	September 26, 2009	Kitt Peak	Spacewatch	L4	5.8 km	MPC · JPL
778022	2009 SQ_{415}	—	September 20, 2009	Kitt Peak	Spacewatch	·	1.2 km	MPC · JPL
778023	2009 SW_{415}	—	September 25, 2009	Mount Lemmon	Mount Lemmon Survey	·	1.1 km	MPC · JPL
778024	2009 SZ_{415}	—	September 27, 2009	Kitt Peak	Spacewatch	L4	7.2 km	MPC · JPL
778025	2009 SG_{416}	—	September 16, 2009	Kitt Peak	Spacewatch	ADE	1.6 km	MPC · JPL
778026	2009 SN_{416}	—	September 20, 2009	Mount Lemmon	Mount Lemmon Survey	·	1.3 km	MPC · JPL
778027	2009 SW_{420}	—	September 21, 2009	Mount Lemmon	Mount Lemmon Survey	·	2.2 km	MPC · JPL
778028	2009 SC_{421}	—	September 21, 2009	Kitt Peak	Spacewatch	·	1.3 km	MPC · JPL
778029	2009 SM_{421}	—	September 28, 2009	Kitt Peak	Spacewatch	L4	5.7 km	MPC · JPL
778030	2009 SL_{423}	—	September 20, 2009	Kitt Peak	Spacewatch	·	1.9 km	MPC · JPL
778031	2009 SM_{423}	—	September 27, 2009	Kitt Peak	Spacewatch	L4 · ERY	5.8 km	MPC · JPL
778032	2009 SV_{424}	—	September 27, 2009	Kitt Peak	Spacewatch	·	1.3 km	MPC · JPL
778033	2009 SG_{425}	—	September 20, 2009	Mount Lemmon	Mount Lemmon Survey	·	1.3 km	MPC · JPL
778034	2009 SS_{428}	—	September 20, 2009	Kitt Peak	Spacewatch	AGN	920 m	MPC · JPL
778035	2009 SY_{429}	—	September 18, 2009	Kitt Peak	Spacewatch	L4	5.4 km	MPC · JPL
778036	2009 TL_{1}	—	September 19, 2009	Catalina	CSS	·	1.3 km	MPC · JPL
778037	2009 TQ_{28}	—	October 15, 2009	Mount Lemmon	Mount Lemmon Survey	·	910 m	MPC · JPL
778038	2009 TU_{30}	—	October 15, 2009	Mount Lemmon	Mount Lemmon Survey	L4 · ERY	5.6 km	MPC · JPL
778039	2009 TW_{50}	—	October 14, 2009	Mount Lemmon	Mount Lemmon Survey	·	1.8 km	MPC · JPL
778040	2009 TJ_{51}	—	October 14, 2009	Mount Lemmon	Mount Lemmon Survey	MRX	830 m	MPC · JPL
778041	2009 TM_{52}	—	February 5, 2011	Haleakala	Pan-STARRS 1	·	1.6 km	MPC · JPL
778042	2009 TW_{52}	—	September 14, 2014	Kitt Peak	Spacewatch	·	1.4 km	MPC · JPL
778043	2009 TT_{53}	—	August 8, 2013	Haleakala	Pan-STARRS 1	HOF	1.7 km	MPC · JPL
778044	2009 TU_{54}	—	October 15, 2009	Mount Lemmon	Mount Lemmon Survey	·	1.6 km	MPC · JPL
778045	2009 TX_{54}	—	October 15, 2009	Mount Lemmon	Mount Lemmon Survey	·	1.3 km	MPC · JPL
778046	2009 TJ_{55}	—	October 14, 2009	Mount Lemmon	Mount Lemmon Survey	KOR	950 m	MPC · JPL
778047	2009 TE_{56}	—	October 14, 2009	Mount Lemmon	Mount Lemmon Survey	L4 · ERY	6.5 km	MPC · JPL
778048	2009 TL_{56}	—	October 14, 2009	Mount Lemmon	Mount Lemmon Survey	KOR	980 m	MPC · JPL
778049	2009 TA_{57}	—	October 14, 2009	Mount Lemmon	Mount Lemmon Survey	·	1.2 km	MPC · JPL
778050	2009 TS_{57}	—	October 14, 2009	Mount Lemmon	Mount Lemmon Survey	L4	5.3 km	MPC · JPL
778051	2009 TT_{57}	—	October 15, 2009	Kitt Peak	Spacewatch	L4	5.3 km	MPC · JPL
778052	2009 TA_{59}	—	October 11, 2009	Mount Lemmon	Mount Lemmon Survey	·	1.3 km	MPC · JPL
778053	2009 UO_{10}	—	September 18, 2009	Kitt Peak	Spacewatch	HYG	1.9 km	MPC · JPL
778054	2009 UP_{13}	—	October 18, 2009	Kitt Peak	Spacewatch	HOF	1.8 km	MPC · JPL
778055	2009 UL_{23}	—	September 14, 2009	Kitt Peak	Spacewatch	·	1.4 km	MPC · JPL
778056	2009 UT_{27}	—	September 22, 2009	Mount Lemmon	Mount Lemmon Survey	EUN	1.1 km	MPC · JPL
778057	2009 UV_{29}	—	October 18, 2009	Mount Lemmon	Mount Lemmon Survey	L4	5.8 km	MPC · JPL
778058	2009 UH_{30}	—	October 18, 2009	Mount Lemmon	Mount Lemmon Survey	·	2.0 km	MPC · JPL
778059	2009 UV_{36}	—	September 21, 2009	Mount Lemmon	Mount Lemmon Survey	EUN	680 m	MPC · JPL
778060	2009 UC_{41}	—	September 27, 2009	Kitt Peak	Spacewatch	·	1.6 km	MPC · JPL
778061	2009 UW_{41}	—	October 18, 2009	Mount Lemmon	Mount Lemmon Survey	KOR	940 m	MPC · JPL
778062	2009 UR_{42}	—	October 18, 2009	Mount Lemmon	Mount Lemmon Survey	KOR	1.0 km	MPC · JPL
778063	2009 UH_{47}	—	October 18, 2009	Kitt Peak	Spacewatch	·	1.3 km	MPC · JPL
778064	2009 UB_{48}	—	September 20, 2009	Kitt Peak	Spacewatch	·	1.3 km	MPC · JPL
778065	2009 UO_{49}	—	October 22, 2009	Mount Lemmon	Mount Lemmon Survey	·	1.5 km	MPC · JPL
778066	2009 UD_{61}	—	September 28, 2009	Mount Lemmon	Mount Lemmon Survey	·	3.1 km	MPC · JPL
778067	2009 UL_{62}	—	October 17, 2009	Mount Lemmon	Mount Lemmon Survey	EOS	1.2 km	MPC · JPL
778068	2009 UU_{63}	—	October 17, 2009	Mount Lemmon	Mount Lemmon Survey	·	1.3 km	MPC · JPL
778069	2009 UQ_{79}	—	October 22, 2009	Mount Lemmon	Mount Lemmon Survey	·	1.3 km	MPC · JPL
778070	2009 UL_{89}	—	October 13, 2009	La Sagra	OAM	·	2.3 km	MPC · JPL
778071	2009 UM_{92}	—	September 29, 2009	Mount Lemmon	Mount Lemmon Survey	·	1.2 km	MPC · JPL
778072	2009 UN_{92}	—	October 22, 2009	Mount Lemmon	Mount Lemmon Survey	KOR	1.0 km	MPC · JPL
778073	2009 UF_{102}	—	October 24, 2009	Mount Lemmon	Mount Lemmon Survey	L4	5.4 km	MPC · JPL
778074	2009 UB_{108}	—	September 10, 2004	Kitt Peak	Spacewatch	·	1.4 km	MPC · JPL
778075	2009 UX_{109}	—	October 23, 2009	Mount Lemmon	Mount Lemmon Survey	·	1.1 km	MPC · JPL
778076	2009 UK_{119}	—	September 19, 2009	Kitt Peak	Spacewatch	AGN	880 m	MPC · JPL
778077	2009 UC_{123}	—	September 17, 2009	Mount Lemmon	Mount Lemmon Survey	·	950 m	MPC · JPL
778078	2009 UT_{124}	—	October 26, 2009	Mount Lemmon	Mount Lemmon Survey	·	1.5 km	MPC · JPL
778079	2009 UA_{150}	—	October 27, 2009	Kitt Peak	Spacewatch	EOS	1.4 km	MPC · JPL
778080	2009 UD_{161}	—	November 30, 2014	Mount Lemmon	Mount Lemmon Survey	·	1.2 km	MPC · JPL
778081	2009 UP_{164}	—	October 24, 2009	Mount Lemmon	Mount Lemmon Survey	·	2.3 km	MPC · JPL
778082	2009 UY_{164}	—	October 23, 2009	Kitt Peak	Spacewatch	ADE	1.3 km	MPC · JPL
778083	2009 UE_{168}	—	September 20, 2014	Haleakala	Pan-STARRS 1	·	1.3 km	MPC · JPL
778084	2009 UG_{168}	—	October 16, 2009	Mount Lemmon	Mount Lemmon Survey	·	1.4 km	MPC · JPL
778085	2009 UQ_{168}	—	March 28, 2016	Mount Lemmon	Mount Lemmon Survey	·	1.3 km	MPC · JPL
778086	2009 UK_{172}	—	October 18, 2009	Mount Lemmon	Mount Lemmon Survey	EOS	1.1 km	MPC · JPL
778087	2009 UQ_{172}	—	March 13, 2016	Haleakala	Pan-STARRS 1	·	1.4 km	MPC · JPL
778088	2009 UU_{172}	—	March 24, 2012	Kitt Peak	Spacewatch	·	1.2 km	MPC · JPL
778089	2009 UV_{172}	—	July 6, 2018	Haleakala	Pan-STARRS 1	·	1.5 km	MPC · JPL
778090	2009 UH_{173}	—	October 23, 2014	Kitt Peak	Spacewatch	·	1.7 km	MPC · JPL
778091	2009 US_{174}	—	October 27, 2009	Mount Lemmon	Mount Lemmon Survey	·	1.7 km	MPC · JPL
778092	2009 UM_{175}	—	October 27, 2009	Mount Lemmon	Mount Lemmon Survey	EOS	1.3 km	MPC · JPL
778093	2009 UZ_{176}	—	October 16, 2009	Mount Lemmon	Mount Lemmon Survey	·	1.4 km	MPC · JPL
778094	2009 UA_{182}	—	October 23, 2009	Mount Lemmon	Mount Lemmon Survey	·	2.1 km	MPC · JPL
778095	2009 UR_{185}	—	October 18, 2009	Mount Lemmon	Mount Lemmon Survey	·	1.7 km	MPC · JPL
778096	2009 UV_{185}	—	October 23, 2009	Mount Lemmon	Mount Lemmon Survey	·	1.6 km	MPC · JPL
778097	2009 UT_{187}	—	September 27, 2009	Mount Lemmon	Mount Lemmon Survey	·	1.2 km	MPC · JPL
778098	2009 UF_{189}	—	October 16, 2009	Mount Lemmon	Mount Lemmon Survey	·	1.2 km	MPC · JPL
778099	2009 UQ_{189}	—	October 16, 2009	Mount Lemmon	Mount Lemmon Survey	L4	5.6 km	MPC · JPL
778100	2009 UW_{189}	—	October 16, 2009	Mount Lemmon	Mount Lemmon Survey	L4	5.4 km	MPC · JPL

== 778101–778200 ==
back to top

Designation			Discovery			Properties		Ref
Permanent	Provisional	Named after	Date	Site	Discoverer(s)	Category	Diam.	Ref
778101	2009 UV_{190}	—	October 16, 2009	Mount Lemmon	Mount Lemmon Survey	L4	5.3 km	MPC · JPL
778102	2009 UA_{193}	—	October 18, 2009	Mount Lemmon	Mount Lemmon Survey	L4	5.9 km	MPC · JPL
778103	2009 UA_{194}	—	October 27, 2009	Mount Lemmon	Mount Lemmon Survey	L4	5.8 km	MPC · JPL
778104	2009 UB_{194}	—	October 22, 2009	Mount Lemmon	Mount Lemmon Survey	KOR	1 km	MPC · JPL
778105	2009 UE_{195}	—	October 16, 2009	Mount Lemmon	Mount Lemmon Survey	·	1.5 km	MPC · JPL
778106	2009 UW_{195}	—	October 18, 2009	Mount Lemmon	Mount Lemmon Survey	·	1.2 km	MPC · JPL
778107	2009 VL_{8}	—	November 8, 2009	Mount Lemmon	Mount Lemmon Survey	L4	6.4 km	MPC · JPL
778108	2009 VK_{10}	—	November 8, 2009	Mount Lemmon	Mount Lemmon Survey	HOF	1.6 km	MPC · JPL
778109	2009 VB_{11}	—	November 8, 2009	Mount Lemmon	Mount Lemmon Survey	·	1.1 km	MPC · JPL
778110	2009 VX_{12}	—	November 8, 2009	Mount Lemmon	Mount Lemmon Survey	AEO	760 m	MPC · JPL
778111	2009 VQ_{13}	—	November 8, 2009	Mount Lemmon	Mount Lemmon Survey	·	1.5 km	MPC · JPL
778112	2009 VO_{20}	—	November 9, 2009	Mount Lemmon	Mount Lemmon Survey	·	1.8 km	MPC · JPL
778113	2009 VZ_{24}	—	September 27, 2009	Mount Lemmon	Mount Lemmon Survey	DOR	1.9 km	MPC · JPL
778114	2009 VE_{30}	—	November 9, 2009	Mount Lemmon	Mount Lemmon Survey	·	1.4 km	MPC · JPL
778115	2009 VK_{48}	—	November 9, 2009	Mount Lemmon	Mount Lemmon Survey	·	1.7 km	MPC · JPL
778116	2009 VD_{53}	—	November 10, 2009	Mount Lemmon	Mount Lemmon Survey	L4	5.7 km	MPC · JPL
778117	2009 VW_{64}	—	September 19, 2009	Mount Lemmon	Mount Lemmon Survey	EUN	960 m	MPC · JPL
778118	2009 VD_{66}	—	November 9, 2009	Kitt Peak	Spacewatch	·	1.6 km	MPC · JPL
778119	2009 VC_{91}	—	November 11, 2009	Kitt Peak	Spacewatch	VER	2.0 km	MPC · JPL
778120	2009 VO_{102}	—	November 11, 2009	Kitt Peak	Spacewatch	·	1.3 km	MPC · JPL
778121	2009 VF_{107}	—	April 16, 2007	Mount Lemmon	Mount Lemmon Survey	(194)	1.1 km	MPC · JPL
778122	2009 VS_{124}	—	November 10, 2009	Kitt Peak	Spacewatch	·	1.4 km	MPC · JPL
778123	2009 VA_{125}	—	November 9, 2009	Mount Lemmon	Mount Lemmon Survey	·	1.8 km	MPC · JPL
778124	2009 VK_{126}	—	November 11, 2009	Mount Lemmon	Mount Lemmon Survey	·	1.3 km	MPC · JPL
778125	2009 VP_{126}	—	November 8, 2009	Kitt Peak	Spacewatch	·	1.4 km	MPC · JPL
778126	2009 VH_{127}	—	November 8, 2009	Mount Lemmon	Mount Lemmon Survey	WIT	730 m	MPC · JPL
778127	2009 VB_{130}	—	November 8, 2009	Mount Lemmon	Mount Lemmon Survey	·	1.3 km	MPC · JPL
778128	2009 VD_{130}	—	November 11, 2009	Mount Lemmon	Mount Lemmon Survey	L4	6.2 km	MPC · JPL
778129	2009 VN_{130}	—	November 10, 2009	Mount Lemmon	Mount Lemmon Survey	·	1.5 km	MPC · JPL
778130	2009 VF_{131}	—	November 10, 2009	Kitt Peak	Spacewatch	·	1.5 km	MPC · JPL
778131	2009 VY_{131}	—	November 8, 2009	Kitt Peak	Spacewatch	·	1.3 km	MPC · JPL
778132	2009 VT_{132}	—	November 8, 2009	Mount Lemmon	Mount Lemmon Survey	·	1.2 km	MPC · JPL
778133	2009 VW_{133}	—	November 10, 2009	Mount Lemmon	Mount Lemmon Survey	KOR	950 m	MPC · JPL
778134	2009 VA_{134}	—	November 10, 2009	Kitt Peak	Spacewatch	KOR	990 m	MPC · JPL
778135	2009 VH_{134}	—	November 11, 2009	Mount Lemmon	Mount Lemmon Survey	·	1.5 km	MPC · JPL
778136	2009 VN_{134}	—	November 9, 2009	Kitt Peak	Spacewatch	·	1.4 km	MPC · JPL
778137	2009 WA_{3}	—	November 16, 2009	Mount Lemmon	Mount Lemmon Survey	·	1.4 km	MPC · JPL
778138	2009 WP_{3}	—	November 16, 2009	Mount Lemmon	Mount Lemmon Survey	·	1.5 km	MPC · JPL
778139	2009 WX_{3}	—	November 16, 2009	Mount Lemmon	Mount Lemmon Survey	·	1.7 km	MPC · JPL
778140	2009 WK_{5}	—	November 16, 2009	Kitt Peak	Spacewatch	·	770 m	MPC · JPL
778141	2009 WU_{15}	—	November 16, 2009	Kitt Peak	Spacewatch	·	1.7 km	MPC · JPL
778142	2009 WR_{19}	—	November 17, 2009	Mount Lemmon	Mount Lemmon Survey	·	1.6 km	MPC · JPL
778143	2009 WT_{28}	—	November 16, 2009	Kitt Peak	Spacewatch	EOS	1.4 km	MPC · JPL
778144	2009 WJ_{42}	—	November 17, 2009	Mount Lemmon	Mount Lemmon Survey	·	1.3 km	MPC · JPL
778145	2009 WK_{46}	—	November 18, 2009	Mount Lemmon	Mount Lemmon Survey	·	1.4 km	MPC · JPL
778146	2009 WZ_{47}	—	September 25, 2009	Catalina	CSS	·	1.1 km	MPC · JPL
778147	2009 WN_{57}	—	October 27, 2009	Kitt Peak	Spacewatch	KOR	1.0 km	MPC · JPL
778148	2009 WF_{60}	—	September 16, 2009	Mount Lemmon	Mount Lemmon Survey	·	1.6 km	MPC · JPL
778149	2009 WW_{61}	—	November 16, 2009	Mount Lemmon	Mount Lemmon Survey	·	1.4 km	MPC · JPL
778150	2009 WF_{62}	—	November 16, 2009	Mount Lemmon	Mount Lemmon Survey	·	1.3 km	MPC · JPL
778151	2009 WS_{67}	—	November 17, 2009	Mount Lemmon	Mount Lemmon Survey	·	1.3 km	MPC · JPL
778152	2009 WF_{82}	—	November 19, 2009	Kitt Peak	Spacewatch	·	1.8 km	MPC · JPL
778153	2009 WQ_{88}	—	November 19, 2009	Kitt Peak	Spacewatch	KOR	960 m	MPC · JPL
778154	2009 WL_{103}	—	November 9, 2009	Mount Lemmon	Mount Lemmon Survey	·	1.4 km	MPC · JPL
778155	2009 WY_{107}	—	November 17, 2009	Mount Lemmon	Mount Lemmon Survey	L4	6.3 km	MPC · JPL
778156	2009 WT_{109}	—	November 17, 2009	Mount Lemmon	Mount Lemmon Survey	AGN	790 m	MPC · JPL
778157	2009 WO_{110}	—	November 17, 2009	Mount Lemmon	Mount Lemmon Survey	AGN	830 m	MPC · JPL
778158	2009 WQ_{110}	—	November 17, 2009	Mount Lemmon	Mount Lemmon Survey	·	1.4 km	MPC · JPL
778159	2009 WR_{111}	—	November 17, 2009	Mount Lemmon	Mount Lemmon Survey	·	1.4 km	MPC · JPL
778160	2009 WJ_{115}	—	November 11, 2009	Mount Lemmon	Mount Lemmon Survey	TIN	800 m	MPC · JPL
778161	2009 WP_{116}	—	November 20, 2009	Kitt Peak	Spacewatch	·	1.4 km	MPC · JPL
778162	2009 WB_{118}	—	November 20, 2009	Kitt Peak	Spacewatch	L4	6.2 km	MPC · JPL
778163	2009 WL_{119}	—	November 20, 2009	Kitt Peak	Spacewatch	KOR	990 m	MPC · JPL
778164	2009 WV_{120}	—	November 20, 2009	Kitt Peak	Spacewatch	·	1.4 km	MPC · JPL
778165	2009 WR_{123}	—	November 10, 2009	Kitt Peak	Spacewatch	·	1.2 km	MPC · JPL
778166	2009 WU_{126}	—	November 20, 2009	Kitt Peak	Spacewatch	·	1.4 km	MPC · JPL
778167	2009 WH_{132}	—	November 21, 2009	Kitt Peak	Spacewatch	·	1.1 km	MPC · JPL
778168	2009 WP_{132}	—	November 21, 2009	Kitt Peak	Spacewatch	KOR	990 m	MPC · JPL
778169	2009 WU_{132}	—	March 17, 2016	Mount Lemmon	Mount Lemmon Survey	·	1.4 km	MPC · JPL
778170	2009 WM_{133}	—	November 22, 2009	Kitt Peak	Spacewatch	VER	2.3 km	MPC · JPL
778171	2009 WD_{139}	—	November 23, 2009	Mount Lemmon	Mount Lemmon Survey	·	1.2 km	MPC · JPL
778172	2009 WJ_{147}	—	November 19, 2009	Mount Lemmon	Mount Lemmon Survey	EOS	1.3 km	MPC · JPL
778173	2009 WW_{150}	—	December 31, 2015	Haleakala	Pan-STARRS 1	·	2.1 km	MPC · JPL
778174	2009 WZ_{150}	—	November 19, 2009	Mount Lemmon	Mount Lemmon Survey	·	1.2 km	MPC · JPL
778175	2009 WX_{153}	—	November 19, 2009	Mount Lemmon	Mount Lemmon Survey	·	1.8 km	MPC · JPL
778176	2009 WN_{154}	—	November 19, 2009	Mount Lemmon	Mount Lemmon Survey	·	1.3 km	MPC · JPL
778177	2009 WU_{158}	—	November 20, 2009	Mount Lemmon	Mount Lemmon Survey	·	2.2 km	MPC · JPL
778178	2009 WB_{161}	—	November 3, 2004	Kitt Peak	Spacewatch	·	1.7 km	MPC · JPL
778179	2009 WS_{162}	—	November 21, 2009	Kitt Peak	Spacewatch	KOR	910 m	MPC · JPL
778180	2009 WQ_{174}	—	November 22, 2009	Kitt Peak	Spacewatch	·	1.3 km	MPC · JPL
778181	2009 WC_{175}	—	October 26, 2009	Kitt Peak	Spacewatch	·	1.5 km	MPC · JPL
778182	2009 WC_{182}	—	November 23, 2009	Kitt Peak	Spacewatch	(5)	1.0 km	MPC · JPL
778183	2009 WF_{186}	—	November 10, 2009	Mount Lemmon	Mount Lemmon Survey	L4 · HEK	6.5 km	MPC · JPL
778184	2009 WB_{188}	—	November 24, 2009	Mount Lemmon	Mount Lemmon Survey	(17392)	1.2 km	MPC · JPL
778185	2009 WC_{191}	—	November 24, 2009	Kitt Peak	Spacewatch	·	1.4 km	MPC · JPL
778186	2009 WT_{193}	—	November 24, 2009	Mount Lemmon	Mount Lemmon Survey	·	2.2 km	MPC · JPL
778187	2009 WP_{197}	—	November 25, 2009	Mount Lemmon	Mount Lemmon Survey	EUN	950 m	MPC · JPL
778188	2009 WZ_{198}	—	November 26, 2009	Mount Lemmon	Mount Lemmon Survey	·	1.4 km	MPC · JPL
778189	2009 WQ_{210}	—	November 18, 2009	Kitt Peak	Spacewatch	(13314)	1.7 km	MPC · JPL
778190	2009 WB_{215}	—	November 17, 2009	Kitt Peak	Spacewatch	·	1.5 km	MPC · JPL
778191	2009 WG_{215}	—	November 22, 2009	Kitt Peak	Spacewatch	·	1.8 km	MPC · JPL
778192	2009 WF_{218}	—	November 19, 2009	La Silla	La Silla	L4	5.2 km	MPC · JPL
778193	2009 WL_{220}	—	November 16, 2009	Mount Lemmon	Mount Lemmon Survey	·	1.4 km	MPC · JPL
778194	2009 WQ_{223}	—	November 16, 2009	Mount Lemmon	Mount Lemmon Survey	·	1.6 km	MPC · JPL
778195	2009 WF_{226}	—	November 17, 2009	Mount Lemmon	Mount Lemmon Survey	·	1.3 km	MPC · JPL
778196	2009 WL_{226}	—	November 17, 2009	Mount Lemmon	Mount Lemmon Survey	·	1.5 km	MPC · JPL
778197	2009 WT_{227}	—	November 17, 2009	Mount Lemmon	Mount Lemmon Survey	·	1.7 km	MPC · JPL
778198	2009 WQ_{229}	—	February 11, 2011	Mount Lemmon	Mount Lemmon Survey	·	1.2 km	MPC · JPL
778199	2009 WY_{236}	—	November 16, 2009	Kitt Peak	Spacewatch	EOS	1.4 km	MPC · JPL
778200	2009 WY_{240}	—	November 18, 2009	Kitt Peak	Spacewatch	·	1.5 km	MPC · JPL

== 778201–778300 ==
back to top

Designation			Discovery			Properties		Ref
Permanent	Provisional	Named after	Date	Site	Discoverer(s)	Category	Diam.	Ref
778201	2009 WW_{244}	—	November 20, 2009	Kitt Peak	Spacewatch	·	1.7 km	MPC · JPL
778202	2009 WC_{245}	—	November 20, 2009	Mount Lemmon	Mount Lemmon Survey	·	1.5 km	MPC · JPL
778203	2009 WH_{258}	—	November 27, 2009	Mount Lemmon	Mount Lemmon Survey	VER	2.2 km	MPC · JPL
778204	2009 WG_{273}	—	April 3, 2016	Haleakala	Pan-STARRS 1	·	1.2 km	MPC · JPL
778205	2009 WU_{275}	—	October 26, 2013	Mount Lemmon	Mount Lemmon Survey	(5)	850 m	MPC · JPL
778206	2009 WB_{277}	—	November 19, 2009	Mount Lemmon	Mount Lemmon Survey	·	2.2 km	MPC · JPL
778207	2009 WC_{277}	—	July 14, 2013	Haleakala	Pan-STARRS 1	·	2.2 km	MPC · JPL
778208	2009 WX_{279}	—	November 20, 2014	Haleakala	Pan-STARRS 1	·	1.3 km	MPC · JPL
778209	2009 WO_{280}	—	February 7, 2011	Mount Lemmon	Mount Lemmon Survey	·	1.5 km	MPC · JPL
778210	2009 WT_{280}	—	November 19, 2009	Kitt Peak	Spacewatch	·	1.1 km	MPC · JPL
778211	2009 WV_{280}	—	January 30, 2016	Mount Lemmon	Mount Lemmon Survey	KOR	1.1 km	MPC · JPL
778212	2009 WW_{280}	—	September 20, 2014	Haleakala	Pan-STARRS 1	EOS	1.1 km	MPC · JPL
778213	2009 WN_{281}	—	August 14, 2013	Haleakala	Pan-STARRS 1	HOF	2.2 km	MPC · JPL
778214	2009 WD_{283}	—	April 27, 2012	Haleakala	Pan-STARRS 1	·	1.6 km	MPC · JPL
778215	2009 WG_{284}	—	November 20, 2009	Kitt Peak	Spacewatch	3:2 · SHU	4.0 km	MPC · JPL
778216	2009 WN_{284}	—	November 22, 2009	Kitt Peak	Spacewatch	BRA	1.3 km	MPC · JPL
778217	2009 WO_{285}	—	May 1, 2012	Mount Lemmon	Mount Lemmon Survey	·	1.6 km	MPC · JPL
778218	2009 WY_{285}	—	April 5, 2016	Haleakala	Pan-STARRS 1	·	1.0 km	MPC · JPL
778219	2009 WD_{286}	—	March 14, 2016	Mount Lemmon	Mount Lemmon Survey	HOF	2.1 km	MPC · JPL
778220	2009 WT_{286}	—	November 21, 2009	Kitt Peak	Spacewatch	·	1.2 km	MPC · JPL
778221	2009 WG_{287}	—	February 11, 2016	Haleakala	Pan-STARRS 1	·	1.4 km	MPC · JPL
778222	2009 WH_{287}	—	June 6, 2018	Haleakala	Pan-STARRS 1	·	1.6 km	MPC · JPL
778223	2009 WL_{287}	—	August 8, 2018	Haleakala	Pan-STARRS 1	·	1.2 km	MPC · JPL
778224	2009 WK_{288}	—	November 27, 2009	Mount Lemmon	Mount Lemmon Survey	·	1.2 km	MPC · JPL
778225	2009 WD_{290}	—	November 17, 2009	Mount Lemmon	Mount Lemmon Survey	HOF	1.7 km	MPC · JPL
778226	2009 WJ_{294}	—	November 18, 2009	Kitt Peak	Spacewatch	·	1.4 km	MPC · JPL
778227	2009 WN_{294}	—	November 18, 2009	Mount Lemmon	Mount Lemmon Survey	L4 · ERY	6.6 km	MPC · JPL
778228	2009 WT_{294}	—	November 24, 2009	Kitt Peak	Spacewatch	·	2.0 km	MPC · JPL
778229	2009 WU_{295}	—	November 27, 2009	Mount Lemmon	Mount Lemmon Survey	KOR	1.1 km	MPC · JPL
778230	2009 WM_{297}	—	April 20, 2020	Haleakala	Pan-STARRS 1	·	1.1 km	MPC · JPL
778231	2009 WP_{299}	—	November 26, 2009	Kitt Peak	Spacewatch	NAE	1.7 km	MPC · JPL
778232	2009 WZ_{299}	—	November 23, 2009	Mount Lemmon	Mount Lemmon Survey	·	1.4 km	MPC · JPL
778233	2009 XB_{26}	—	November 20, 2009	Mount Lemmon	Mount Lemmon Survey	·	1.4 km	MPC · JPL
778234	2009 XW_{30}	—	December 11, 2009	Mount Lemmon	Mount Lemmon Survey	·	1.7 km	MPC · JPL
778235	2009 YT_{19}	—	December 25, 2009	Kitt Peak	Spacewatch	·	1.6 km	MPC · JPL
778236	2009 YT_{28}	—	December 18, 2009	Kitt Peak	Spacewatch	·	1.4 km	MPC · JPL
778237	2009 YR_{29}	—	December 9, 2014	Haleakala	Pan-STARRS 1	·	1.7 km	MPC · JPL
778238	2009 YJ_{33}	—	December 18, 2009	Kitt Peak	Spacewatch	·	1.8 km	MPC · JPL
778239	2009 YN_{35}	—	December 17, 2009	Mount Lemmon	Mount Lemmon Survey	·	2.0 km	MPC · JPL
778240	2010 AM_{10}	—	December 18, 2009	Mount Lemmon	Mount Lemmon Survey	·	1.2 km	MPC · JPL
778241	2010 AQ_{15}	—	January 7, 2010	Mount Lemmon	Mount Lemmon Survey	·	1.6 km	MPC · JPL
778242	2010 AJ_{16}	—	January 7, 2010	Mount Lemmon	Mount Lemmon Survey	EOS	1.4 km	MPC · JPL
778243	2010 AH_{31}	—	January 6, 2010	Kitt Peak	Spacewatch	·	1.2 km	MPC · JPL
778244	2010 AE_{39}	—	January 10, 2010	Mount Lemmon	Mount Lemmon Survey	EOS	1.4 km	MPC · JPL
778245	2010 AR_{42}	—	January 6, 2010	Mount Lemmon	Mount Lemmon Survey	T_{j} (2.98) · 3:2	3.6 km	MPC · JPL
778246	2010 AN_{57}	—	January 11, 2010	Mount Lemmon	Mount Lemmon Survey	·	1.3 km	MPC · JPL
778247	2010 AY_{142}	—	January 7, 2010	Kitt Peak	Spacewatch	·	1.3 km	MPC · JPL
778248	2010 AS_{152}	—	November 6, 2005	Kitt Peak	Spacewatch	·	1.1 km	MPC · JPL
778249	2010 AY_{155}	—	November 21, 2014	Haleakala	Pan-STARRS 1	·	2.2 km	MPC · JPL
778250	2010 AE_{156}	—	August 8, 2012	Haleakala	Pan-STARRS 1	·	1.1 km	MPC · JPL
778251	2010 AG_{158}	—	December 24, 2014	Mount Lemmon	Mount Lemmon Survey	·	2.0 km	MPC · JPL
778252	2010 AH_{158}	—	January 22, 2015	Haleakala	Pan-STARRS 1	·	1.4 km	MPC · JPL
778253	2010 AS_{158}	—	December 25, 2013	Kitt Peak	Spacewatch	EUN	780 m	MPC · JPL
778254	2010 AN_{159}	—	November 9, 2013	Mount Lemmon	Mount Lemmon Survey	·	1.2 km	MPC · JPL
778255	2010 AK_{160}	—	April 11, 2016	Haleakala	Pan-STARRS 1	·	1.7 km	MPC · JPL
778256	2010 AA_{161}	—	July 8, 2018	Haleakala	Pan-STARRS 1	·	1.4 km	MPC · JPL
778257	2010 AX_{161}	—	August 22, 2018	Haleakala	Pan-STARRS 1	·	1.3 km	MPC · JPL
778258	2010 BM_{146}	—	October 18, 2012	Haleakala	Pan-STARRS 1	·	1.2 km	MPC · JPL
778259	2010 BP_{147}	—	April 9, 2010	Mount Lemmon	Mount Lemmon Survey	·	1.7 km	MPC · JPL
778260	2010 BK_{150}	—	October 10, 2015	Haleakala	Pan-STARRS 1	·	2.9 km	MPC · JPL
778261	2010 CH_{20}	—	February 9, 2010	Kitt Peak	Spacewatch	EOS	1.2 km	MPC · JPL
778262	2010 CR_{20}	—	February 4, 2006	Kitt Peak	Spacewatch	·	750 m	MPC · JPL
778263	2010 CV_{88}	—	February 14, 2010	Mount Lemmon	Mount Lemmon Survey	·	1.0 km	MPC · JPL
778264	2010 CE_{89}	—	October 8, 2008	Mount Lemmon	Mount Lemmon Survey	·	1.4 km	MPC · JPL
778265	2010 CJ_{97}	—	February 14, 2010	Mount Lemmon	Mount Lemmon Survey	AEO	680 m	MPC · JPL
778266	2010 CK_{97}	—	February 14, 2010	Mount Lemmon	Mount Lemmon Survey	·	1.7 km	MPC · JPL
778267	2010 CL_{99}	—	January 12, 2010	Kitt Peak	Spacewatch	·	2.1 km	MPC · JPL
778268	2010 CS_{104}	—	February 9, 2010	Kitt Peak	Spacewatch	·	1.5 km	MPC · JPL
778269	2010 CX_{108}	—	February 14, 2010	Mount Lemmon	Mount Lemmon Survey	(5)	900 m	MPC · JPL
778270	2010 CL_{114}	—	November 6, 2008	Kitt Peak	Spacewatch	KOR	1.0 km	MPC · JPL
778271	2010 CV_{118}	—	February 15, 2010	Mount Lemmon	Mount Lemmon Survey	·	1.3 km	MPC · JPL
778272	2010 CD_{119}	—	February 15, 2010	Mount Lemmon	Mount Lemmon Survey	·	2.0 km	MPC · JPL
778273	2010 CQ_{122}	—	February 15, 2010	Mount Lemmon	Mount Lemmon Survey	VER	1.8 km	MPC · JPL
778274	2010 CG_{151}	—	February 14, 2010	Kitt Peak	Spacewatch	·	1.1 km	MPC · JPL
778275	2010 CF_{167}	—	October 28, 2008	Mount Lemmon	Mount Lemmon Survey	AST	1.2 km	MPC · JPL
778276	2010 CH_{167}	—	February 14, 2010	Mount Lemmon	Mount Lemmon Survey	·	2.0 km	MPC · JPL
778277	2010 CX_{173}	—	January 6, 2010	Kitt Peak	Spacewatch	·	1.1 km	MPC · JPL
778278	2010 CK_{178}	—	February 13, 2010	Kitt Peak	Spacewatch	·	800 m	MPC · JPL
778279	2010 CU_{248}	—	October 6, 2018	Mount Lemmon	Mount Lemmon Survey	EOS	1.2 km	MPC · JPL
778280	2010 CQ_{250}	—	January 16, 2015	Haleakala	Pan-STARRS 1	·	1.8 km	MPC · JPL
778281	2010 CB_{256}	—	November 17, 2009	Mount Lemmon	Mount Lemmon Survey	·	1.5 km	MPC · JPL
778282	2010 CQ_{261}	—	November 27, 2013	Haleakala	Pan-STARRS 1	·	1.2 km	MPC · JPL
778283	2010 CM_{262}	—	March 7, 2011	Siegen	Bill, H.	·	2.0 km	MPC · JPL
778284	2010 CH_{273}	—	October 17, 2017	Mount Lemmon	Mount Lemmon Survey	·	1.1 km	MPC · JPL
778285	2010 CN_{273}	—	April 20, 2015	Haleakala	Pan-STARRS 1	·	1.4 km	MPC · JPL
778286	2010 CD_{275}	—	February 15, 2010	Kitt Peak	Spacewatch	EOS	1.3 km	MPC · JPL
778287	2010 CW_{276}	—	February 14, 2010	Kitt Peak	Spacewatch	·	1.1 km	MPC · JPL
778288	2010 DL_{2}	—	February 16, 2010	Mount Lemmon	Mount Lemmon Survey	·	1.4 km	MPC · JPL
778289	2010 DR_{2}	—	February 16, 2010	Mount Lemmon	Mount Lemmon Survey	EUN	960 m	MPC · JPL
778290	2010 DY_{3}	—	February 16, 2010	Mount Lemmon	Mount Lemmon Survey	·	780 m	MPC · JPL
778291	2010 DN_{41}	—	February 17, 2010	Kitt Peak	Spacewatch	·	1.9 km	MPC · JPL
778292	2010 DY_{44}	—	February 17, 2010	Kitt Peak	Spacewatch	EUN	900 m	MPC · JPL
778293	2010 DH_{47}	—	February 17, 2010	Mount Lemmon	Mount Lemmon Survey	VER	1.9 km	MPC · JPL
778294	2010 DZ_{101}	—	August 15, 2013	Haleakala	Pan-STARRS 1	·	1.0 km	MPC · JPL
778295	2010 DG_{108}	—	June 27, 2011	Mount Lemmon	Mount Lemmon Survey	·	1.2 km	MPC · JPL
778296	2010 DZ_{108}	—	October 6, 2008	Kitt Peak	Spacewatch	·	1.6 km	MPC · JPL
778297	2010 DM_{110}	—	February 5, 2016	Haleakala	Pan-STARRS 1	·	2.5 km	MPC · JPL
778298	2010 DW_{110}	—	January 20, 2015	Haleakala	Pan-STARRS 1	·	1.5 km	MPC · JPL
778299	2010 DR_{111}	—	September 6, 2016	Mount Lemmon	Mount Lemmon Survey	·	930 m	MPC · JPL
778300	2010 DN_{112}	—	February 16, 2010	Kitt Peak	Spacewatch	·	1.4 km	MPC · JPL

== 778301–778400 ==
back to top

Designation			Discovery			Properties		Ref
Permanent	Provisional	Named after	Date	Site	Discoverer(s)	Category	Diam.	Ref
778301	2010 DQ_{112}	—	February 17, 2010	Kitt Peak	Spacewatch	·	2.3 km	MPC · JPL
778302	2010 EF_{12}	—	March 7, 2010	Wildberg	R. Apitzsch	·	1.8 km	MPC · JPL
778303	2010 EA_{31}	—	January 5, 2006	Mount Lemmon	Mount Lemmon Survey	BAR	970 m	MPC · JPL
778304	2010 EU_{71}	—	November 20, 2008	Kitt Peak	Spacewatch	KOR	990 m	MPC · JPL
778305	2010 EN_{89}	—	March 14, 2010	Kitt Peak	Spacewatch	·	1.6 km	MPC · JPL
778306	2010 EE_{92}	—	March 14, 2010	Mount Lemmon	Mount Lemmon Survey	·	1.1 km	MPC · JPL
778307	2010 EZ_{92}	—	March 14, 2010	Mount Lemmon	Mount Lemmon Survey	·	1.7 km	MPC · JPL
778308	2010 ED_{94}	—	March 14, 2010	Mount Lemmon	Mount Lemmon Survey	·	1.5 km	MPC · JPL
778309	2010 ED_{100}	—	June 3, 2005	Kitt Peak	Spacewatch	·	1.5 km	MPC · JPL
778310	2010 EH_{100}	—	February 18, 2010	Mount Lemmon	Mount Lemmon Survey	EOS	1.4 km	MPC · JPL
778311	2010 EL_{128}	—	March 12, 2010	Kitt Peak	Spacewatch	·	1.8 km	MPC · JPL
778312	2010 ED_{141}	—	September 11, 2007	Mount Lemmon	Mount Lemmon Survey	·	1.2 km	MPC · JPL
778313	2010 EP_{172}	—	March 10, 2005	Kitt Peak	Deep Ecliptic Survey	·	1.6 km	MPC · JPL
778314	2010 EF_{189}	—	January 30, 2015	Haleakala	Pan-STARRS 1	·	1.6 km	MPC · JPL
778315	2010 EM_{189}	—	August 10, 2012	Kitt Peak	Spacewatch	EOS	1.5 km	MPC · JPL
778316	2010 ET_{191}	—	March 12, 2010	Kitt Peak	Spacewatch	·	1.9 km	MPC · JPL
778317	2010 FF_{4}	—	March 16, 2010	Mount Lemmon	Mount Lemmon Survey	·	1.6 km	MPC · JPL
778318	2010 FH_{11}	—	March 16, 2010	Kitt Peak	Spacewatch	·	1.3 km	MPC · JPL
778319	2010 FJ_{16}	—	March 12, 2010	Kitt Peak	Spacewatch	·	770 m	MPC · JPL
778320	2010 FN_{26}	—	March 19, 2010	Mount Lemmon	Mount Lemmon Survey	·	1.7 km	MPC · JPL
778321	2010 FX_{48}	—	March 22, 2010	ESA OGS	ESA OGS	MIS	1.7 km	MPC · JPL
778322	2010 FJ_{93}	—	March 18, 2010	Kitt Peak	Spacewatch	3:2 · SHU	3.9 km	MPC · JPL
778323	2010 FA_{130}	—	February 5, 2009	Kitt Peak	Spacewatch	·	2.3 km	MPC · JPL
778324	2010 FY_{131}	—	March 27, 2010	WISE	WISE	·	2.0 km	MPC · JPL
778325	2010 FJ_{133}	—	March 28, 2010	WISE	WISE	·	1.2 km	MPC · JPL
778326	2010 FR_{135}	—	October 2, 2008	Kitt Peak	Spacewatch	·	2.6 km	MPC · JPL
778327	2010 FN_{138}	—	July 5, 2011	Haleakala	Pan-STARRS 1	·	1.1 km	MPC · JPL
778328	2010 FC_{141}	—	May 1, 2011	Haleakala	Pan-STARRS 1	·	2.8 km	MPC · JPL
778329	2010 FG_{143}	—	March 25, 2010	Kitt Peak	Spacewatch	KON	1.7 km	MPC · JPL
778330	2010 FW_{143}	—	March 18, 2010	Mount Lemmon	Mount Lemmon Survey	·	1.1 km	MPC · JPL
778331	2010 FK_{145}	—	January 26, 2015	Haleakala	Pan-STARRS 1	EOS	1.2 km	MPC · JPL
778332	2010 GJ_{34}	—	April 24, 2006	Kitt Peak	Spacewatch	·	960 m	MPC · JPL
778333	2010 GE_{91}	—	April 13, 2010	WISE	WISE	·	1.3 km	MPC · JPL
778334	2010 GZ_{94}	—	April 14, 2010	WISE	WISE	·	1.8 km	MPC · JPL
778335	2010 GB_{103}	—	April 6, 2010	Mount Lemmon	Mount Lemmon Survey	·	1.4 km	MPC · JPL
778336	2010 GW_{113}	—	April 10, 2010	Kitt Peak	Spacewatch	·	1.8 km	MPC · JPL
778337	2010 GG_{130}	—	April 8, 2010	Kitt Peak	Spacewatch	·	2.0 km	MPC · JPL
778338	2010 GJ_{133}	—	April 11, 2010	Mount Lemmon	Mount Lemmon Survey	·	1.3 km	MPC · JPL
778339	2010 GH_{137}	—	April 5, 2010	Mount Lemmon	Mount Lemmon Survey	·	1.7 km	MPC · JPL
778340	2010 GE_{192}	—	January 21, 2014	Kitt Peak	Spacewatch	·	1.8 km	MPC · JPL
778341	2010 GB_{198}	—	August 30, 2016	Haleakala	Pan-STARRS 1	·	1.9 km	MPC · JPL
778342	2010 GG_{198}	—	February 19, 2009	Kitt Peak	Spacewatch	EUP	2.5 km	MPC · JPL
778343	2010 GG_{200}	—	January 23, 2015	Haleakala	Pan-STARRS 1	·	1.6 km	MPC · JPL
778344	2010 GN_{201}	—	January 16, 2015	Haleakala	Pan-STARRS 1	·	1.8 km	MPC · JPL
778345	2010 GH_{203}	—	April 5, 2014	Haleakala	Pan-STARRS 1	EUN	710 m	MPC · JPL
778346	2010 GL_{203}	—	April 1, 2014	Mount Lemmon	Mount Lemmon Survey	·	860 m	MPC · JPL
778347	2010 GO_{203}	—	July 30, 2017	Haleakala	Pan-STARRS 1	·	1.5 km	MPC · JPL
778348	2010 GR_{203}	—	June 29, 2015	Haleakala	Pan-STARRS 1	·	1.4 km	MPC · JPL
778349	2010 GS_{204}	—	July 27, 2011	Haleakala	Pan-STARRS 1	·	690 m	MPC · JPL
778350	2010 GN_{207}	—	April 12, 2010	Mount Lemmon	Mount Lemmon Survey	·	1.6 km	MPC · JPL
778351	2010 GR_{207}	—	April 9, 2010	Mount Lemmon	Mount Lemmon Survey	·	1.4 km	MPC · JPL
778352	2010 GF_{210}	—	April 8, 2010	Kitt Peak	Spacewatch	EOS	1.1 km	MPC · JPL
778353	2010 GU_{211}	—	April 8, 2010	Kitt Peak	Spacewatch	·	1.2 km	MPC · JPL
778354	2010 GZ_{212}	—	April 14, 2010	Mount Lemmon	Mount Lemmon Survey	·	850 m	MPC · JPL
778355	2010 HZ_{11}	—	April 17, 2010	WISE	WISE	·	2.0 km	MPC · JPL
778356	2010 HG_{108}	—	April 26, 2010	Mount Lemmon	Mount Lemmon Survey	·	1.3 km	MPC · JPL
778357	2010 HA_{115}	—	May 21, 2015	Haleakala	Pan-STARRS 1	·	1 km	MPC · JPL
778358	2010 HF_{115}	—	August 27, 2016	Haleakala	Pan-STARRS 1	·	1.7 km	MPC · JPL
778359	2010 HF_{116}	—	December 8, 2012	Mount Lemmon	Mount Lemmon Survey	·	2.3 km	MPC · JPL
778360	2010 HL_{120}	—	October 2, 2008	Mount Lemmon	Mount Lemmon Survey	·	2.2 km	MPC · JPL
778361	2010 HB_{122}	—	March 10, 2016	Haleakala	Pan-STARRS 1	·	1.7 km	MPC · JPL
778362	2010 HM_{122}	—	December 4, 2007	Mount Lemmon	Mount Lemmon Survey	·	1.0 km	MPC · JPL
778363	2010 HW_{123}	—	September 13, 2002	Palomar Mountain	NEAT	KON	1.9 km	MPC · JPL
778364	2010 HR_{129}	—	April 25, 2010	WISE	WISE	·	1.7 km	MPC · JPL
778365	2010 HK_{136}	—	January 28, 2014	Mount Lemmon	Langbroek, M.	·	900 m	MPC · JPL
778366	2010 HX_{138}	—	October 22, 2012	Haleakala	Pan-STARRS 1	·	1.4 km	MPC · JPL
778367	2010 HM_{141}	—	February 19, 2015	Mount Lemmon	Mount Lemmon Survey	·	1.5 km	MPC · JPL
778368	2010 JD_{32}	—	May 6, 2010	Mount Lemmon	Mount Lemmon Survey	·	2.3 km	MPC · JPL
778369	2010 JY_{32}	—	May 6, 2010	Mount Lemmon	Mount Lemmon Survey	·	740 m	MPC · JPL
778370	2010 JH_{36}	—	May 5, 2010	Mount Lemmon	Mount Lemmon Survey	·	1.6 km	MPC · JPL
778371	2010 JR_{36}	—	May 5, 2010	Mount Lemmon	Mount Lemmon Survey	MIS	2.0 km	MPC · JPL
778372	2010 JB_{39}	—	May 5, 2010	Mount Lemmon	Mount Lemmon Survey	·	1.0 km	MPC · JPL
778373	2010 JK_{45}	—	May 7, 2010	Kitt Peak	Spacewatch	·	980 m	MPC · JPL
778374	2010 JA_{46}	—	May 7, 2010	Kitt Peak	Spacewatch	3:2	3.8 km	MPC · JPL
778375	2010 JB_{80}	—	May 11, 2010	La Silla	D. L. Rabinowitz, S. Tourtellotte	centaur	20 km	MPC · JPL
778376	2010 JD_{118}	—	October 20, 2007	Mount Lemmon	Mount Lemmon Survey	·	1.9 km	MPC · JPL
778377	2010 JS_{120}	—	May 12, 2010	Mount Lemmon	Mount Lemmon Survey	·	2.3 km	MPC · JPL
778378	2010 JZ_{148}	—	May 5, 2010	Mount Lemmon	Mount Lemmon Survey	·	1.8 km	MPC · JPL
778379	2010 JW_{153}	—	May 13, 2010	Kitt Peak	Spacewatch	·	2.5 km	MPC · JPL
778380	2010 JD_{192}	—	August 1, 2016	Haleakala	Pan-STARRS 1	·	2.1 km	MPC · JPL
778381	2010 JY_{194}	—	March 26, 2009	Mount Lemmon	Mount Lemmon Survey	·	2.3 km	MPC · JPL
778382	2010 JO_{199}	—	July 25, 2017	Haleakala	Pan-STARRS 1	·	1.6 km	MPC · JPL
778383	2010 JZ_{205}	—	May 14, 2010	WISE	WISE	(1298)	2.0 km	MPC · JPL
778384	2010 JN_{212}	—	April 10, 2010	Kitt Peak	Spacewatch	·	1.1 km	MPC · JPL
778385	2010 JC_{213}	—	August 27, 2011	Haleakala	Pan-STARRS 1	·	880 m	MPC · JPL
778386	2010 JV_{213}	—	October 20, 2012	Piszkés-tető	K. Sárneczky, A. Király	EOS	1.4 km	MPC · JPL
778387	2010 JP_{214}	—	April 30, 2016	Haleakala	Pan-STARRS 1	·	2.0 km	MPC · JPL
778388	2010 KH_{10}	—	May 17, 2010	Kitt Peak	Spacewatch	·	1.1 km	MPC · JPL
778389	2010 KC_{129}	—	May 20, 2010	Mount Lemmon	Mount Lemmon Survey	·	1.2 km	MPC · JPL
778390	2010 KS_{134}	—	September 15, 2010	Mount Lemmon	Mount Lemmon Survey	·	950 m	MPC · JPL
778391	2010 KQ_{140}	—	May 19, 2010	WISE	WISE	·	1.3 km	MPC · JPL
778392	2010 KD_{150}	—	February 26, 2014	Haleakala	Pan-STARRS 1	·	2.4 km	MPC · JPL
778393	2010 KB_{151}	—	May 27, 2010	WISE	WISE	·	2.2 km	MPC · JPL
778394	2010 KP_{151}	—	May 27, 2010	WISE	WISE	LIX	2.8 km	MPC · JPL
778395	2010 KW_{151}	—	May 28, 2010	WISE	WISE	·	1.2 km	MPC · JPL
778396	2010 KU_{153}	—	May 29, 2010	WISE	WISE	·	2.6 km	MPC · JPL
778397	2010 KO_{154}	—	October 13, 2010	Mount Lemmon	Mount Lemmon Survey	·	2.5 km	MPC · JPL
778398	2010 KJ_{157}	—	March 24, 2014	Haleakala	Pan-STARRS 1	EUN	910 m	MPC · JPL
778399	2010 KR_{159}	—	May 19, 2010	Mount Lemmon	Mount Lemmon Survey	·	1.9 km	MPC · JPL
778400	2010 KU_{159}	—	May 21, 2010	Mount Lemmon	Mount Lemmon Survey	·	2.1 km	MPC · JPL

== 778401–778500 ==
back to top

Designation			Discovery			Properties		Ref
Permanent	Provisional	Named after	Date	Site	Discoverer(s)	Category	Diam.	Ref
778401	2010 LT_{104}	—	June 14, 2010	Mount Lemmon	Mount Lemmon Survey	EUN	900 m	MPC · JPL
778402	2010 LF_{107}	—	June 5, 2010	Kitt Peak	Spacewatch	·	1.8 km	MPC · JPL
778403	2010 LK_{108}	—	June 14, 2010	Mount Lemmon	Mount Lemmon Survey	TIR	2.3 km	MPC · JPL
778404	2010 LE_{111}	—	June 15, 2010	Mount Lemmon	Mount Lemmon Survey	·	2.1 km	MPC · JPL
778405	2010 LY_{133}	—	June 11, 2010	Mount Lemmon	Mount Lemmon Survey	THM	1.8 km	MPC · JPL
778406	2010 LW_{135}	—	June 11, 2015	Haleakala	Pan-STARRS 1	·	1.8 km	MPC · JPL
778407	2010 LQ_{136}	—	June 12, 2015	Mount Lemmon	Mount Lemmon Survey	THB	2.5 km	MPC · JPL
778408	2010 LF_{141}	—	January 20, 2015	Haleakala	Pan-STARRS 1	·	2.1 km	MPC · JPL
778409	2010 LB_{143}	—	February 20, 2015	Haleakala	Pan-STARRS 1	·	1.4 km	MPC · JPL
778410	2010 LG_{147}	—	October 27, 2016	Haleakala	Pan-STARRS 1	·	2.1 km	MPC · JPL
778411	2010 LG_{148}	—	September 10, 2010	Catalina	CSS	·	2.7 km	MPC · JPL
778412	2010 LC_{160}	—	June 11, 2010	Mount Lemmon	Mount Lemmon Survey	·	1.2 km	MPC · JPL
778413	2010 ME_{120}	—	September 27, 2016	Haleakala	Pan-STARRS 1	·	2.5 km	MPC · JPL
778414	2010 MD_{121}	—	March 5, 2016	Haleakala	Pan-STARRS 1	(1118)	2.5 km	MPC · JPL
778415	2010 MF_{123}	—	April 4, 2008	Mount Lemmon	Mount Lemmon Survey	·	2.6 km	MPC · JPL
778416	2010 MF_{131}	—	February 10, 2014	Haleakala	Pan-STARRS 1	·	1.2 km	MPC · JPL
778417	2010 MN_{137}	—	February 24, 2015	Haleakala	Pan-STARRS 1	·	1.6 km	MPC · JPL
778418	2010 MO_{137}	—	August 23, 2017	Haleakala	Pan-STARRS 1	·	2.1 km	MPC · JPL
778419	2010 MV_{144}	—	September 18, 2010	Mount Lemmon	Mount Lemmon Survey	·	1.4 km	MPC · JPL
778420	2010 MZ_{147}	—	May 20, 2015	Mount Lemmon	Mount Lemmon Survey	·	2.5 km	MPC · JPL
778421	2010 MJ_{148}	—	June 21, 2010	Mount Lemmon	Mount Lemmon Survey	·	2.2 km	MPC · JPL
778422	2010 MS_{149}	—	May 6, 2014	Haleakala	Pan-STARRS 1	·	770 m	MPC · JPL
778423	2010 NS_{37}	—	July 8, 2010	WISE	WISE	·	2.1 km	MPC · JPL
778424	2010 NN_{60}	—	July 11, 2010	WISE	WISE	·	1.6 km	MPC · JPL
778425	2010 NE_{74}	—	July 15, 2010	WISE	WISE	·	1.6 km	MPC · JPL
778426	2010 NX_{118}	—	October 6, 2008	Mount Lemmon	Mount Lemmon Survey	ADE	1.4 km	MPC · JPL
778427	2010 ND_{119}	—	July 1, 2010	WISE	WISE	·	1.8 km	MPC · JPL
778428	2010 NS_{120}	—	February 24, 2015	Haleakala	Pan-STARRS 1	·	1.5 km	MPC · JPL
778429	2010 NJ_{144}	—	September 29, 2011	Mount Lemmon	Mount Lemmon Survey	·	1.0 km	MPC · JPL
778430	2010 NW_{146}	—	April 8, 2014	Mount Lemmon	Mount Lemmon Survey	JUN	770 m	MPC · JPL
778431	2010 NN_{148}	—	July 6, 2010	Kitt Peak	Spacewatch	EOS	1.4 km	MPC · JPL
778432	2010 OD_{11}	—	July 16, 2010	WISE	WISE	·	2.4 km	MPC · JPL
778433	2010 OW_{144}	—	February 24, 2015	Haleakala	Pan-STARRS 1	URS	2.3 km	MPC · JPL
778434	2010 PZ_{75}	—	June 10, 2010	Mount Lemmon	Mount Lemmon Survey	·	1.5 km	MPC · JPL
778435	2010 PU_{87}	—	September 11, 2015	Haleakala	Pan-STARRS 1	·	980 m	MPC · JPL
778436	2010 PN_{89}	—	August 13, 2010	Kitt Peak	Spacewatch	LIX	2.8 km	MPC · JPL
778437	2010 PE_{90}	—	August 10, 2010	Kitt Peak	Spacewatch	·	1.3 km	MPC · JPL
778438	2010 PU_{91}	—	August 13, 2010	Kitt Peak	Spacewatch	(5)	900 m	MPC · JPL
778439	2010 PT_{92}	—	August 13, 2010	Kitt Peak	Spacewatch	EOS	1.2 km	MPC · JPL
778440	2010 PC_{93}	—	August 7, 2010	Westfield	International Astronomical Search Collaboration	EOS	1.5 km	MPC · JPL
778441	2010 QT_{6}	—	August 21, 2010	Bergisch Gladbach	W. Bickel	·	2.3 km	MPC · JPL
778442	2010 RJ_{3}	—	August 12, 2010	Kitt Peak	Spacewatch	JUN	910 m	MPC · JPL
778443	2010 RE_{4}	—	September 2, 2010	Mount Lemmon	Mount Lemmon Survey	·	1.6 km	MPC · JPL
778444	2010 RY_{13}	—	September 1, 2010	Mount Lemmon	Mount Lemmon Survey	·	1.4 km	MPC · JPL
778445	2010 RJ_{17}	—	September 2, 2010	Socorro	LINEAR	·	1.1 km	MPC · JPL
778446	2010 RK_{18}	—	September 2, 2010	Mount Lemmon	Mount Lemmon Survey	·	760 m	MPC · JPL
778447	2010 RB_{22}	—	September 3, 2010	Mount Lemmon	Mount Lemmon Survey	·	1.2 km	MPC · JPL
778448	2010 RA_{25}	—	September 3, 2000	Apache Point	SDSS	KOR	1 km	MPC · JPL
778449	2010 RZ_{27}	—	September 3, 2010	Mount Lemmon	Mount Lemmon Survey	·	900 m	MPC · JPL
778450	2010 RA_{30}	—	September 4, 2010	Mount Lemmon	Mount Lemmon Survey	·	860 m	MPC · JPL
778451	2010 RT_{31}	—	September 1, 2010	Mount Lemmon	Mount Lemmon Survey	HNS	660 m	MPC · JPL
778452	2010 RK_{32}	—	September 1, 2010	Mount Lemmon	Mount Lemmon Survey	VER	1.9 km	MPC · JPL
778453	2010 RN_{33}	—	February 11, 2008	Mount Lemmon	Mount Lemmon Survey	TIR	2.2 km	MPC · JPL
778454	2010 RY_{36}	—	September 2, 2010	Rehoboth	L. A. Molnar, A. Vanden Heuvel	MAR	810 m	MPC · JPL
778455	2010 RM_{38}	—	September 5, 2010	Mount Lemmon	Mount Lemmon Survey	·	1.7 km	MPC · JPL
778456	2010 RR_{42}	—	September 3, 2010	Piszkés-tető	K. Sárneczky, Z. Kuli	AGN	840 m	MPC · JPL
778457	2010 RN_{43}	—	October 3, 2005	Kitt Peak	Spacewatch	·	1.9 km	MPC · JPL
778458	2010 RV_{44}	—	September 2, 2010	Mount Lemmon	Mount Lemmon Survey	·	890 m	MPC · JPL
778459	2010 RU_{45}	—	September 3, 2010	Piszkés-tető	K. Sárneczky, Z. Kuli	·	930 m	MPC · JPL
778460	2010 RT_{53}	—	July 4, 2014	Haleakala	Pan-STARRS 1	·	1.1 km	MPC · JPL
778461	2010 RN_{54}	—	September 4, 2010	Mount Lemmon	Mount Lemmon Survey	·	1.3 km	MPC · JPL
778462	2010 RN_{65}	—	September 10, 2010	Mount Lemmon	Mount Lemmon Survey	·	1.3 km	MPC · JPL
778463	2010 RH_{66}	—	September 4, 2010	Mount Lemmon	Mount Lemmon Survey	EOS	1.3 km	MPC · JPL
778464	2010 RK_{70}	—	August 13, 2010	Kitt Peak	Spacewatch	·	2.2 km	MPC · JPL
778465	2010 RO_{73}	—	September 1, 2010	ESA OGS	ESA OGS	·	1.3 km	MPC · JPL
778466	2010 RF_{77}	—	September 11, 2010	Mount Lemmon	Mount Lemmon Survey	·	870 m	MPC · JPL
778467	2010 RM_{79}	—	September 3, 2010	La Sagra	OAM	·	1.8 km	MPC · JPL
778468	2010 RD_{91}	—	September 17, 2006	Kitt Peak	Spacewatch	KON	1.5 km	MPC · JPL
778469	2010 RX_{91}	—	September 10, 2010	Kitt Peak	Spacewatch	MAR	680 m	MPC · JPL
778470	2010 RT_{95}	—	September 12, 2010	Mount Lemmon	Mount Lemmon Survey	·	2.6 km	MPC · JPL
778471	2010 RU_{99}	—	September 10, 2010	Kitt Peak	Spacewatch	·	970 m	MPC · JPL
778472	2010 RK_{108}	—	September 10, 2010	Mount Lemmon	Mount Lemmon Survey	·	1.2 km	MPC · JPL
778473	2010 RV_{113}	—	September 11, 2010	Kitt Peak	Spacewatch	·	1.5 km	MPC · JPL
778474	2010 RO_{120}	—	November 27, 2006	Bergisch Gladbach	W. Bickel	·	960 m	MPC · JPL
778475	2010 RJ_{130}	—	September 9, 2010	Westfield	International Astronomical Search Collaboration	(1118)	2.8 km	MPC · JPL
778476	2010 RT_{140}	—	August 12, 2010	Kitt Peak	Spacewatch	·	1.1 km	MPC · JPL
778477	2010 RQ_{143}	—	September 14, 2010	Kitt Peak	Spacewatch	·	1.1 km	MPC · JPL
778478	2010 RC_{146}	—	September 14, 2010	Kitt Peak	Spacewatch	·	1.2 km	MPC · JPL
778479	2010 RQ_{161}	—	August 10, 2010	Kitt Peak	Spacewatch	·	1.4 km	MPC · JPL
778480	2010 RW_{186}	—	January 3, 2012	Mount Lemmon	Mount Lemmon Survey	·	950 m	MPC · JPL
778481	2010 RM_{192}	—	September 12, 2016	Mount Lemmon	Mount Lemmon Survey	·	2.1 km	MPC · JPL
778482	2010 RN_{196}	—	September 3, 2014	Mount Lemmon	Mount Lemmon Survey	·	720 m	MPC · JPL
778483	2010 RJ_{197}	—	September 6, 2010	Piszkés-tető	K. Sárneczky, Z. Kuli	T_{j} (2.99) · EUP	2.4 km	MPC · JPL
778484	2010 RT_{197}	—	September 3, 2010	Mount Lemmon	Mount Lemmon Survey	·	1.5 km	MPC · JPL
778485	2010 RF_{200}	—	October 11, 2015	ESA OGS	ESA OGS	WIT	730 m	MPC · JPL
778486	2010 RM_{202}	—	May 21, 2014	Haleakala	Pan-STARRS 1	·	1.6 km	MPC · JPL
778487	2010 RK_{203}	—	January 29, 2017	Haleakala	Pan-STARRS 1	·	970 m	MPC · JPL
778488	2010 RM_{204}	—	December 18, 2015	Mount Lemmon	Mount Lemmon Survey	·	1.1 km	MPC · JPL
778489	2010 RQ_{204}	—	June 15, 2018	Haleakala	Pan-STARRS 1	MAR	880 m	MPC · JPL
778490	2010 RY_{204}	—	January 20, 2012	Kitt Peak	Spacewatch	·	1 km	MPC · JPL
778491	2010 RJ_{206}	—	September 12, 2010	Kitt Peak	Spacewatch	·	2.1 km	MPC · JPL
778492	2010 RU_{206}	—	April 16, 2020	Mount Lemmon	Mount Lemmon Survey	·	1.9 km	MPC · JPL
778493	2010 RP_{207}	—	September 4, 2010	Mount Lemmon	Mount Lemmon Survey	KOR	860 m	MPC · JPL
778494	2010 RA_{209}	—	September 14, 2010	Kitt Peak	Spacewatch	·	1.2 km	MPC · JPL
778495	2010 RB_{210}	—	September 14, 2010	Mount Lemmon	Mount Lemmon Survey	·	1.3 km	MPC · JPL
778496	2010 RH_{210}	—	September 5, 2010	Mount Lemmon	Mount Lemmon Survey	·	2.1 km	MPC · JPL
778497	2010 RQ_{210}	—	September 11, 2010	Mount Lemmon	Mount Lemmon Survey	·	1.4 km	MPC · JPL
778498	2010 RC_{211}	—	September 2, 2010	Mount Lemmon	Mount Lemmon Survey	·	1.0 km	MPC · JPL
778499	2010 RB_{214}	—	October 25, 2005	Catalina	CSS	·	2.1 km	MPC · JPL
778500	2010 RC_{214}	—	February 17, 2004	Kitt Peak	Spacewatch	AEO	890 m	MPC · JPL

== 778501–778600 ==
back to top

Designation			Discovery			Properties		Ref
Permanent	Provisional	Named after	Date	Site	Discoverer(s)	Category	Diam.	Ref
778501	2010 RP_{214}	—	September 5, 2010	Mount Lemmon	Mount Lemmon Survey	·	2.4 km	MPC · JPL
778502	2010 RP_{217}	—	September 5, 2010	Mount Lemmon	Mount Lemmon Survey	·	2.1 km	MPC · JPL
778503	2010 RS_{217}	—	September 15, 2010	Kitt Peak	Spacewatch	VER	1.8 km	MPC · JPL
778504	2010 RW_{219}	—	September 5, 2010	Mount Lemmon	Mount Lemmon Survey	·	2.0 km	MPC · JPL
778505	2010 RM_{221}	—	September 2, 2010	Mount Lemmon	Mount Lemmon Survey	·	1.3 km	MPC · JPL
778506	2010 RU_{223}	—	September 2, 2010	Mount Lemmon	Mount Lemmon Survey	·	1.3 km	MPC · JPL
778507	2010 RU_{224}	—	September 2, 2010	Mount Lemmon	Mount Lemmon Survey	·	720 m	MPC · JPL
778508	2010 RA_{229}	—	September 8, 2010	Kitt Peak	Spacewatch	·	1.6 km	MPC · JPL
778509	2010 SW	—	September 16, 2010	Mount Lemmon	Mount Lemmon Survey	·	1.2 km	MPC · JPL
778510	2010 SO_{14}	—	August 21, 2015	Haleakala	Pan-STARRS 1	·	1.2 km	MPC · JPL
778511	2010 SK_{17}	—	September 2, 2010	Mount Lemmon	Mount Lemmon Survey	EUN	900 m	MPC · JPL
778512	2010 SJ_{21}	—	September 28, 2010	Kitt Peak	Spacewatch	·	1.3 km	MPC · JPL
778513	2010 SL_{24}	—	September 25, 2006	Kitt Peak	Spacewatch	·	1 km	MPC · JPL
778514	2010 SB_{28}	—	November 14, 2006	Mount Lemmon	Mount Lemmon Survey	·	1.2 km	MPC · JPL
778515	2010 SA_{29}	—	September 29, 2010	Mount Lemmon	Mount Lemmon Survey	·	1.6 km	MPC · JPL
778516	2010 SE_{35}	—	November 19, 2006	Kitt Peak	Spacewatch	·	1.1 km	MPC · JPL
778517	2010 SG_{44}	—	September 16, 2010	Kitt Peak	Spacewatch	·	1.1 km	MPC · JPL
778518	2010 SO_{48}	—	September 18, 2010	Mount Lemmon	Mount Lemmon Survey	·	2.4 km	MPC · JPL
778519	2010 SL_{50}	—	September 30, 2010	Mount Lemmon	Mount Lemmon Survey	·	2.8 km	MPC · JPL
778520	2010 SW_{50}	—	September 29, 2010	Mount Lemmon	Mount Lemmon Survey	·	1.2 km	MPC · JPL
778521	2010 SF_{52}	—	September 19, 2010	Kitt Peak	Spacewatch	·	1.4 km	MPC · JPL
778522	2010 SW_{53}	—	February 25, 2017	Haleakala	Pan-STARRS 1	·	1.1 km	MPC · JPL
778523	2010 SM_{56}	—	September 13, 2005	Kitt Peak	Spacewatch	·	1.6 km	MPC · JPL
778524	2010 SL_{59}	—	September 19, 2010	Kitt Peak	Spacewatch	·	2.6 km	MPC · JPL
778525	2010 SK_{60}	—	September 18, 2010	Mount Lemmon	Mount Lemmon Survey	EUN	920 m	MPC · JPL
778526	2010 SR_{64}	—	September 17, 2010	Mount Lemmon	Mount Lemmon Survey	·	2.1 km	MPC · JPL
778527	2010 SH_{65}	—	September 29, 2010	Mount Lemmon	Mount Lemmon Survey	·	1.9 km	MPC · JPL
778528	2010 SC_{67}	—	September 30, 2010	Mount Lemmon	Mount Lemmon Survey	·	1.1 km	MPC · JPL
778529	2010 SE_{67}	—	September 30, 2010	Mount Lemmon	Mount Lemmon Survey	·	1.1 km	MPC · JPL
778530	2010 SS_{67}	—	September 30, 2010	Mount Lemmon	Mount Lemmon Survey	·	930 m	MPC · JPL
778531	2010 SZ_{68}	—	September 30, 2010	Mount Lemmon	Mount Lemmon Survey	·	1.5 km	MPC · JPL
778532	2010 TL_{3}	—	October 2, 2010	Kitt Peak	Spacewatch	·	2.4 km	MPC · JPL
778533	2010 TJ_{20}	—	October 1, 2010	Socorro	LINEAR	JUN	930 m	MPC · JPL
778534	2010 TE_{21}	—	September 14, 2010	Kitt Peak	Spacewatch	·	980 m	MPC · JPL
778535	2010 TC_{22}	—	September 17, 2010	Kitt Peak	Spacewatch	·	1.1 km	MPC · JPL
778536	2010 TR_{22}	—	October 1, 2010	Kitt Peak	Spacewatch	·	1.3 km	MPC · JPL
778537	2010 TO_{26}	—	February 28, 2008	Mount Lemmon	Mount Lemmon Survey	·	2.2 km	MPC · JPL
778538	2010 TF_{36}	—	October 3, 2010	Kitt Peak	Spacewatch	HOF	2.0 km	MPC · JPL
778539	2010 TD_{39}	—	October 7, 2010	Kitt Peak	Spacewatch	·	1.0 km	MPC · JPL
778540	2010 TL_{41}	—	September 16, 2010	Kitt Peak	Spacewatch	·	2.3 km	MPC · JPL
778541	2010 TJ_{43}	—	September 18, 2010	Kitt Peak	Spacewatch	AGN	810 m	MPC · JPL
778542	2010 TA_{46}	—	September 14, 2010	Kitt Peak	Spacewatch	·	1.1 km	MPC · JPL
778543	2010 TA_{47}	—	October 6, 2010	Westfield	International Astronomical Search Collaboration	·	1.3 km	MPC · JPL
778544	2010 TQ_{47}	—	November 23, 2006	Kitt Peak	Spacewatch	·	1.0 km	MPC · JPL
778545	2010 TO_{48}	—	September 4, 2010	Kitt Peak	Spacewatch	THM	1.7 km	MPC · JPL
778546	2010 TQ_{48}	—	October 2, 2010	Kitt Peak	Spacewatch	·	2.2 km	MPC · JPL
778547	2010 TG_{56}	—	October 3, 2010	Kitt Peak	Spacewatch	·	2.2 km	MPC · JPL
778548	2010 TY_{58}	—	October 7, 2010	Piszkés-tető	K. Sárneczky, Z. Kuli	VER	2.0 km	MPC · JPL
778549	2010 TG_{60}	—	October 7, 2010	Kitt Peak	Spacewatch	·	1.0 km	MPC · JPL
778550	2010 TY_{60}	—	October 7, 2010	Kitt Peak	Spacewatch	HNS	830 m	MPC · JPL
778551	2010 TP_{68}	—	October 8, 2010	Kitt Peak	Spacewatch	·	1.7 km	MPC · JPL
778552	2010 TK_{79}	—	October 8, 2010	Kitt Peak	Spacewatch	·	1.2 km	MPC · JPL
778553	2010 TN_{87}	—	October 1, 2010	Mount Lemmon	Mount Lemmon Survey	·	960 m	MPC · JPL
778554	2010 TN_{89}	—	September 4, 2010	Kitt Peak	Spacewatch	·	1.1 km	MPC · JPL
778555	2010 TZ_{92}	—	September 11, 2010	Kitt Peak	Spacewatch	·	1.2 km	MPC · JPL
778556	2010 TJ_{94}	—	October 1, 2010	Kitt Peak	Spacewatch	·	1.1 km	MPC · JPL
778557	2010 TB_{105}	—	October 9, 2010	Kitt Peak	Spacewatch	·	1.3 km	MPC · JPL
778558	2010 TN_{105}	—	October 9, 2010	Kitt Peak	Spacewatch	·	2.1 km	MPC · JPL
778559	2010 TU_{105}	—	October 9, 2010	Kitt Peak	Spacewatch	·	930 m	MPC · JPL
778560	2010 TC_{107}	—	October 1, 2010	Mount Lemmon	Mount Lemmon Survey	·	1.2 km	MPC · JPL
778561	2010 TB_{110}	—	October 9, 2010	Mount Lemmon	Mount Lemmon Survey	·	1.0 km	MPC · JPL
778562	2010 TA_{111}	—	October 9, 2010	Mount Lemmon	Mount Lemmon Survey	·	1.2 km	MPC · JPL
778563	2010 TG_{112}	—	September 29, 2010	Kitt Peak	Spacewatch	·	970 m	MPC · JPL
778564	2010 TA_{120}	—	October 10, 2010	Kitt Peak	Spacewatch	·	970 m	MPC · JPL
778565	2010 TH_{120}	—	October 10, 2010	Mount Lemmon	Mount Lemmon Survey	·	1.5 km	MPC · JPL
778566	2010 TZ_{120}	—	September 15, 2010	Kitt Peak	Spacewatch	3:2	4.4 km	MPC · JPL
778567	2010 TD_{125}	—	October 10, 2010	Mount Lemmon	Mount Lemmon Survey	·	1.1 km	MPC · JPL
778568	2010 TN_{130}	—	October 11, 2010	Mount Lemmon	Mount Lemmon Survey	·	1.6 km	MPC · JPL
778569	2010 TS_{132}	—	October 11, 2010	Mount Lemmon	Mount Lemmon Survey	·	1.1 km	MPC · JPL
778570	2010 TF_{134}	—	May 10, 2005	Mount Lemmon	Mount Lemmon Survey	EUN	900 m	MPC · JPL
778571	2010 TN_{134}	—	October 11, 2010	Mount Lemmon	Mount Lemmon Survey	·	1.1 km	MPC · JPL
778572	2010 TQ_{136}	—	October 11, 2010	Mount Lemmon	Mount Lemmon Survey	·	1.1 km	MPC · JPL
778573	2010 TK_{144}	—	October 11, 2010	Mount Lemmon	Mount Lemmon Survey	HYG	1.9 km	MPC · JPL
778574	2010 TX_{145}	—	October 11, 2010	Kitt Peak	Spacewatch	·	1.5 km	MPC · JPL
778575	2010 TR_{150}	—	September 19, 2010	Mount Lemmon	Mount Lemmon Survey	·	1.1 km	MPC · JPL
778576	2010 TW_{157}	—	September 30, 2010	Mount Lemmon	Mount Lemmon Survey	KOR	930 m	MPC · JPL
778577	2010 TF_{160}	—	October 10, 2010	Mount Lemmon	Mount Lemmon Survey	·	960 m	MPC · JPL
778578	2010 TP_{162}	—	March 31, 2009	Kitt Peak	Spacewatch	·	1.1 km	MPC · JPL
778579	2010 TF_{163}	—	October 12, 2010	Mount Lemmon	Mount Lemmon Survey	·	1.3 km	MPC · JPL
778580	2010 TA_{180}	—	October 2, 2010	Kitt Peak	Spacewatch	·	1.2 km	MPC · JPL
778581	2010 TX_{192}	—	December 23, 2012	Haleakala	Pan-STARRS 1	L4	5.7 km	MPC · JPL
778582	2010 TW_{193}	—	October 8, 2010	Kitt Peak	Spacewatch	AST	1.3 km	MPC · JPL
778583	2010 TR_{197}	—	October 12, 2010	Mount Lemmon	Mount Lemmon Survey	·	2.0 km	MPC · JPL
778584	2010 TY_{200}	—	August 31, 2014	Mount Lemmon	Mount Lemmon Survey	MAR	700 m	MPC · JPL
778585	2010 TM_{203}	—	March 6, 2013	Haleakala	Pan-STARRS 1	·	2.6 km	MPC · JPL
778586	2010 TB_{204}	—	October 2, 2010	Mount Lemmon	Mount Lemmon Survey	MRX	720 m	MPC · JPL
778587	2010 TO_{204}	—	August 22, 2014	Haleakala	Pan-STARRS 1	·	1.1 km	MPC · JPL
778588	2010 TV_{204}	—	October 10, 2010	Kitt Peak	Spacewatch	·	1.2 km	MPC · JPL
778589	2010 TV_{206}	—	October 9, 2010	Mount Lemmon	Mount Lemmon Survey	·	1.0 km	MPC · JPL
778590	2010 TY_{207}	—	March 17, 2013	Mount Lemmon	Mount Lemmon Survey	VER	2.0 km	MPC · JPL
778591	2010 TN_{208}	—	November 20, 2015	Mount Lemmon	Mount Lemmon Survey	·	1.3 km	MPC · JPL
778592	2010 TO_{208}	—	October 1, 2010	Mount Lemmon	Mount Lemmon Survey	AGN	870 m	MPC · JPL
778593	2010 TR_{208}	—	August 3, 2014	Haleakala	Pan-STARRS 1	·	1.1 km	MPC · JPL
778594	2010 TX_{208}	—	October 12, 2010	Mount Lemmon	Mount Lemmon Survey	HNS	790 m	MPC · JPL
778595	2010 TA_{209}	—	October 8, 2015	Haleakala	Pan-STARRS 1	·	1.4 km	MPC · JPL
778596	2010 TP_{210}	—	July 23, 2015	Haleakala	Pan-STARRS 1	VER	1.8 km	MPC · JPL
778597	2010 TW_{211}	—	October 12, 2010	Mount Lemmon	Mount Lemmon Survey	·	1.1 km	MPC · JPL
778598	2010 TJ_{213}	—	October 14, 2010	Mount Lemmon	Mount Lemmon Survey	·	990 m	MPC · JPL
778599	2010 TB_{214}	—	October 13, 2010	Mount Lemmon	Mount Lemmon Survey	·	1.4 km	MPC · JPL
778600	2010 TH_{217}	—	October 12, 2010	Mount Lemmon	Mount Lemmon Survey	·	1.1 km	MPC · JPL

== 778601–778700 ==
back to top

Designation			Discovery			Properties		Ref
Permanent	Provisional	Named after	Date	Site	Discoverer(s)	Category	Diam.	Ref
778601	2010 TM_{218}	—	October 9, 2010	Kitt Peak	Spacewatch	EOS	1.4 km	MPC · JPL
778602	2010 TS_{219}	—	October 13, 2010	Mount Lemmon	Mount Lemmon Survey	·	1.3 km	MPC · JPL
778603	2010 TG_{220}	—	October 12, 2010	Mount Lemmon	Mount Lemmon Survey	·	1.2 km	MPC · JPL
778604	2010 TQ_{222}	—	October 9, 2010	Mount Lemmon	Mount Lemmon Survey	·	1.1 km	MPC · JPL
778605	2010 TB_{223}	—	October 12, 2010	Mount Lemmon	Mount Lemmon Survey	·	1.7 km	MPC · JPL
778606	2010 TG_{223}	—	October 11, 2010	Mount Lemmon	Mount Lemmon Survey	HNS	700 m	MPC · JPL
778607	2010 TN_{224}	—	October 2, 2010	Kitt Peak	Spacewatch	T_{j} (2.99)	3.2 km	MPC · JPL
778608	2010 TQ_{224}	—	October 13, 2010	Mount Lemmon	Mount Lemmon Survey	·	1.5 km	MPC · JPL
778609	2010 TW_{224}	—	October 10, 2010	Mount Lemmon	Mount Lemmon Survey	·	1.1 km	MPC · JPL
778610	2010 TD_{225}	—	October 11, 2010	Catalina	CSS	·	1.1 km	MPC · JPL
778611	2010 TQ_{228}	—	October 13, 2010	Mount Lemmon	Mount Lemmon Survey	L4	5.7 km	MPC · JPL
778612	2010 TZ_{228}	—	October 13, 2010	Mount Lemmon	Mount Lemmon Survey	L4 · ERY	5.7 km	MPC · JPL
778613	2010 TR_{230}	—	October 13, 2010	Kitt Peak	Spacewatch	·	1.5 km	MPC · JPL
778614	2010 TW_{230}	—	October 14, 2010	Mount Lemmon	Mount Lemmon Survey	·	1.5 km	MPC · JPL
778615	2010 TA_{234}	—	October 13, 2010	Mount Lemmon	Mount Lemmon Survey	·	2.6 km	MPC · JPL
778616	2010 TH_{236}	—	October 10, 2010	Mount Lemmon	Mount Lemmon Survey	·	920 m	MPC · JPL
778617	2010 TM_{236}	—	October 1, 2010	Mount Lemmon	Mount Lemmon Survey	·	2.2 km	MPC · JPL
778618	2010 TS_{236}	—	October 1, 2010	Mount Lemmon	Mount Lemmon Survey	·	1.4 km	MPC · JPL
778619	2010 TX_{237}	—	October 9, 2010	Mount Lemmon	Mount Lemmon Survey	·	2.1 km	MPC · JPL
778620	2010 TZ_{237}	—	October 11, 2010	Mount Lemmon	Mount Lemmon Survey	L4 · ERY	4.9 km	MPC · JPL
778621	2010 TP_{238}	—	October 10, 2010	Kitt Peak	Spacewatch	·	1.3 km	MPC · JPL
778622	2010 TE_{239}	—	October 12, 2010	Mount Lemmon	Mount Lemmon Survey	·	1.2 km	MPC · JPL
778623	2010 TE_{240}	—	October 9, 2010	Mount Lemmon	Mount Lemmon Survey	·	890 m	MPC · JPL
778624	2010 TF_{240}	—	October 10, 2010	Kitt Peak	Spacewatch	·	1.1 km	MPC · JPL
778625	2010 UU_{3}	—	October 17, 2010	Mount Lemmon	Mount Lemmon Survey	·	1.3 km	MPC · JPL
778626	2010 UM_{5}	—	October 17, 2010	Kitt Peak	Spacewatch	·	1.5 km	MPC · JPL
778627	2010 UF_{17}	—	October 28, 2010	Mount Lemmon	Mount Lemmon Survey	·	1.1 km	MPC · JPL
778628	2010 UG_{30}	—	October 13, 2010	Mount Lemmon	Mount Lemmon Survey	·	1.4 km	MPC · JPL
778629	2010 UL_{34}	—	October 13, 2010	Mount Lemmon	Mount Lemmon Survey	EOS	1.4 km	MPC · JPL
778630	2010 UO_{36}	—	October 29, 2010	Mount Lemmon	Mount Lemmon Survey	EUN	900 m	MPC · JPL
778631	2010 UQ_{40}	—	September 17, 2010	Mount Lemmon	Mount Lemmon Survey	·	1.5 km	MPC · JPL
778632	2010 UO_{66}	—	October 31, 2010	Mount Lemmon	Mount Lemmon Survey	·	1.4 km	MPC · JPL
778633	2010 UR_{67}	—	October 11, 2010	Mount Lemmon	Mount Lemmon Survey	·	1.1 km	MPC · JPL
778634	2010 UT_{74}	—	December 14, 2001	Socorro	LINEAR	·	1.2 km	MPC · JPL
778635	2010 UY_{85}	—	October 19, 2010	Mount Lemmon	Mount Lemmon Survey	·	1.2 km	MPC · JPL
778636	2010 UF_{86}	—	October 30, 2010	Mount Lemmon	Mount Lemmon Survey	GEF	940 m	MPC · JPL
778637	2010 UM_{89}	—	October 9, 2010	Mount Lemmon	Mount Lemmon Survey	·	2.5 km	MPC · JPL
778638	2010 UE_{90}	—	October 31, 2010	Mount Lemmon	Mount Lemmon Survey	·	1.2 km	MPC · JPL
778639	2010 UZ_{90}	—	October 31, 2010	Mount Lemmon	Mount Lemmon Survey	·	1.0 km	MPC · JPL
778640	2010 UL_{91}	—	October 31, 2010	Kitt Peak	Spacewatch	·	1.7 km	MPC · JPL
778641	2010 UL_{100}	—	October 30, 2010	Mount Lemmon	Mount Lemmon Survey	·	1.3 km	MPC · JPL
778642	2010 UQ_{102}	—	November 3, 2010	Mount Lemmon	Mount Lemmon Survey	·	2.2 km	MPC · JPL
778643	2010 UO_{105}	—	November 11, 2010	Mount Lemmon	Mount Lemmon Survey	·	1.2 km	MPC · JPL
778644	2010 UL_{109}	—	October 28, 2010	Mount Lemmon	Mount Lemmon Survey	·	1.0 km	MPC · JPL
778645	2010 UO_{109}	—	October 28, 2010	Mount Lemmon	Mount Lemmon Survey	·	1.1 km	MPC · JPL
778646	2010 UP_{109}	—	October 28, 2010	Mount Lemmon	Mount Lemmon Survey	THM	1.8 km	MPC · JPL
778647	2010 UV_{109}	—	October 31, 2010	Mount Lemmon	Mount Lemmon Survey	·	1.4 km	MPC · JPL
778648	2010 UO_{112}	—	October 17, 2010	Mount Lemmon	Mount Lemmon Survey	·	1.1 km	MPC · JPL
778649	2010 UC_{116}	—	October 17, 2010	Mount Lemmon	Mount Lemmon Survey	·	1.2 km	MPC · JPL
778650	2010 UZ_{116}	—	October 31, 2010	Mount Lemmon	Mount Lemmon Survey	(13314)	1.4 km	MPC · JPL
778651	2010 US_{117}	—	October 10, 2015	Haleakala	Pan-STARRS 1	KOR	910 m	MPC · JPL
778652	2010 UE_{118}	—	September 2, 2014	Haleakala	Pan-STARRS 1	·	1.1 km	MPC · JPL
778653	2010 US_{119}	—	April 25, 2017	Haleakala	Pan-STARRS 1	HNS	810 m	MPC · JPL
778654	2010 UW_{123}	—	October 30, 2010	Catalina	CSS	EOS	1.8 km	MPC · JPL
778655	2010 UP_{124}	—	October 17, 2010	Mount Lemmon	Mount Lemmon Survey	WIT	610 m	MPC · JPL
778656	2010 UW_{125}	—	October 29, 2010	Mount Lemmon	Mount Lemmon Survey	·	2.1 km	MPC · JPL
778657	2010 UE_{126}	—	October 28, 2010	Mount Lemmon	Mount Lemmon Survey	·	1.1 km	MPC · JPL
778658	2010 UK_{127}	—	October 28, 2010	Mount Lemmon	Mount Lemmon Survey	·	1.8 km	MPC · JPL
778659	2010 UD_{128}	—	October 17, 2010	Mount Lemmon	Mount Lemmon Survey	·	2.1 km	MPC · JPL
778660	2010 US_{129}	—	October 17, 2010	Mount Lemmon	Mount Lemmon Survey	L4	5.8 km	MPC · JPL
778661	2010 UH_{130}	—	October 17, 2010	Mount Lemmon	Mount Lemmon Survey	·	2.2 km	MPC · JPL
778662	2010 UM_{130}	—	October 30, 2010	Mount Lemmon	Mount Lemmon Survey	L4	6.4 km	MPC · JPL
778663	2010 UP_{131}	—	October 30, 2010	Mount Lemmon	Mount Lemmon Survey	VER	2.0 km	MPC · JPL
778664	2010 UJ_{135}	—	October 31, 2010	Mount Lemmon	Mount Lemmon Survey	MAR	730 m	MPC · JPL
778665	2010 UY_{135}	—	July 25, 2014	Haleakala	Pan-STARRS 1	·	1.2 km	MPC · JPL
778666	2010 UU_{136}	—	October 17, 2010	Mount Lemmon	Mount Lemmon Survey	·	1.2 km	MPC · JPL
778667	2010 UF_{138}	—	October 17, 2010	Mount Lemmon	Mount Lemmon Survey	·	1.2 km	MPC · JPL
778668	2010 US_{138}	—	October 28, 2010	Mount Lemmon	Mount Lemmon Survey	·	1.2 km	MPC · JPL
778669	2010 VE_{3}	—	November 1, 2010	Mount Lemmon	Mount Lemmon Survey	·	1.2 km	MPC · JPL
778670	2010 VZ_{5}	—	November 1, 2010	Mount Lemmon	Mount Lemmon Survey	L4	5.3 km	MPC · JPL
778671	2010 VQ_{18}	—	November 2, 2010	Mount Lemmon	Mount Lemmon Survey	·	860 m	MPC · JPL
778672	2010 VB_{33}	—	November 3, 2010	Mount Lemmon	Mount Lemmon Survey	·	1.1 km	MPC · JPL
778673	2010 VD_{34}	—	October 1, 2010	Mount Lemmon	Mount Lemmon Survey	·	630 m	MPC · JPL
778674	2010 VL_{35}	—	September 16, 2010	Mount Lemmon	Mount Lemmon Survey	·	1.2 km	MPC · JPL
778675	2010 VA_{42}	—	November 1, 2010	Catalina	CSS	·	1.1 km	MPC · JPL
778676	2010 VT_{42}	—	September 18, 2010	Mount Lemmon	Mount Lemmon Survey	·	1.2 km	MPC · JPL
778677	2010 VE_{43}	—	November 1, 2010	Mount Lemmon	Mount Lemmon Survey	·	1.2 km	MPC · JPL
778678	2010 VW_{44}	—	November 1, 2010	Mount Lemmon	Mount Lemmon Survey	EUN	820 m	MPC · JPL
778679	2010 VR_{47}	—	November 2, 2010	Kitt Peak	Spacewatch	·	1.3 km	MPC · JPL
778680	2010 VH_{51}	—	November 3, 2010	Kitt Peak	Spacewatch	·	1.5 km	MPC · JPL
778681	2010 VX_{51}	—	November 3, 2010	Mount Lemmon	Mount Lemmon Survey	·	960 m	MPC · JPL
778682	2010 VV_{52}	—	November 3, 2010	Mount Lemmon	Mount Lemmon Survey	L4 · ERY	5.7 km	MPC · JPL
778683	2010 VW_{56}	—	November 3, 2010	Mount Lemmon	Mount Lemmon Survey	MIS	2.0 km	MPC · JPL
778684	2010 VB_{67}	—	October 2, 2010	Mount Lemmon	Mount Lemmon Survey	·	1.4 km	MPC · JPL
778685	2010 VO_{71}	—	December 4, 2005	Mount Lemmon	Mount Lemmon Survey	THM	1.9 km	MPC · JPL
778686	2010 VJ_{79}	—	August 20, 2014	Haleakala	Pan-STARRS 1	·	1.3 km	MPC · JPL
778687	2010 VU_{93}	—	November 7, 2010	Mount Lemmon	Mount Lemmon Survey	·	1.6 km	MPC · JPL
778688	2010 VZ_{93}	—	November 7, 2010	Mount Lemmon	Mount Lemmon Survey	·	1.2 km	MPC · JPL
778689	2010 VN_{94}	—	November 7, 2010	Mount Lemmon	Mount Lemmon Survey	·	1.5 km	MPC · JPL
778690	2010 VZ_{120}	—	November 8, 2010	Kitt Peak	Spacewatch	L4	5.6 km	MPC · JPL
778691	2010 VC_{122}	—	November 8, 2010	Mount Lemmon	Mount Lemmon Survey	·	1.1 km	MPC · JPL
778692	2010 VE_{122}	—	November 8, 2010	Mount Lemmon	Mount Lemmon Survey	L4	5.1 km	MPC · JPL
778693	2010 VV_{122}	—	November 8, 2010	Mount Lemmon	Mount Lemmon Survey	·	1.1 km	MPC · JPL
778694	2010 VP_{134}	—	November 10, 2010	Kitt Peak	Spacewatch	·	1.1 km	MPC · JPL
778695	2010 VX_{135}	—	October 19, 2010	Mount Lemmon	Mount Lemmon Survey	BRA	1.2 km	MPC · JPL
778696	2010 VL_{141}	—	November 6, 2010	Mount Lemmon	Mount Lemmon Survey	·	2.0 km	MPC · JPL
778697	2010 VH_{142}	—	November 6, 2010	Mount Lemmon	Mount Lemmon Survey	L4	5.5 km	MPC · JPL
778698	2010 VV_{143}	—	November 6, 2010	Mount Lemmon	Mount Lemmon Survey	·	1.0 km	MPC · JPL
778699	2010 VM_{145}	—	November 6, 2010	Mount Lemmon	Mount Lemmon Survey	L4	5.6 km	MPC · JPL
778700	2010 VM_{149}	—	November 6, 2010	Mount Lemmon	Mount Lemmon Survey	·	1.9 km	MPC · JPL

== 778701–778800 ==
back to top

Designation			Discovery			Properties		Ref
Permanent	Provisional	Named after	Date	Site	Discoverer(s)	Category	Diam.	Ref
778701	2010 VY_{157}	—	November 8, 2010	Mount Lemmon	Mount Lemmon Survey	·	1.2 km	MPC · JPL
778702	2010 VD_{158}	—	November 8, 2010	Mauna Kea	Forshay, P., M. Micheli	AGN	830 m	MPC · JPL
778703	2010 VJ_{158}	—	November 8, 2010	Mauna Kea	Forshay, P., M. Micheli	·	2.2 km	MPC · JPL
778704	2010 VQ_{158}	—	November 8, 2010	Mauna Kea	Forshay, P., M. Micheli	·	1.2 km	MPC · JPL
778705	2010 VR_{158}	—	November 8, 2010	Mauna Kea	Forshay, P., M. Micheli	·	1.1 km	MPC · JPL
778706	2010 VY_{161}	—	November 10, 2010	Kitt Peak	Spacewatch	·	1.1 km	MPC · JPL
778707	2010 VY_{163}	—	November 10, 2010	Kitt Peak	Spacewatch	·	1.4 km	MPC · JPL
778708	2010 VE_{165}	—	November 10, 2010	Kitt Peak	Spacewatch	·	1.2 km	MPC · JPL
778709	2010 VG_{177}	—	November 11, 2010	Mount Lemmon	Mount Lemmon Survey	·	1.1 km	MPC · JPL
778710	2010 VM_{186}	—	November 13, 2010	Mount Lemmon	Mount Lemmon Survey	·	1.3 km	MPC · JPL
778711	2010 VB_{188}	—	November 13, 2010	Mount Lemmon	Mount Lemmon Survey	L4	6.6 km	MPC · JPL
778712	2010 VA_{196}	—	November 12, 2010	Mount Lemmon	Mount Lemmon Survey	L4	5.8 km	MPC · JPL
778713	2010 VF_{197}	—	October 30, 2010	Mount Lemmon	Mount Lemmon Survey	L4	8.0 km	MPC · JPL
778714	2010 VC_{216}	—	January 30, 2011	Haleakala	Pan-STARRS 1	EUN	810 m	MPC · JPL
778715	2010 VK_{218}	—	December 5, 2010	Mount Lemmon	Mount Lemmon Survey	·	950 m	MPC · JPL
778716	2010 VW_{230}	—	August 20, 2014	Haleakala	Pan-STARRS 1	·	1.2 km	MPC · JPL
778717	2010 VN_{232}	—	October 12, 2015	Haleakala	Pan-STARRS 1	EOS	1.4 km	MPC · JPL
778718	2010 VE_{233}	—	April 15, 2013	Haleakala	Pan-STARRS 1	·	1 km	MPC · JPL
778719	2010 VL_{233}	—	June 7, 2013	Haleakala	Pan-STARRS 1	·	830 m	MPC · JPL
778720	2010 VV_{239}	—	November 12, 2010	Mount Lemmon	Mount Lemmon Survey	CLO	1.1 km	MPC · JPL
778721	2010 VZ_{240}	—	November 1, 2010	Mount Lemmon	Mount Lemmon Survey	·	2.6 km	MPC · JPL
778722	2010 VP_{241}	—	July 25, 2015	Haleakala	Pan-STARRS 1	·	2.4 km	MPC · JPL
778723	2010 VA_{242}	—	April 19, 2013	Haleakala	Pan-STARRS 1	·	1.5 km	MPC · JPL
778724	2010 VT_{242}	—	June 28, 2014	Haleakala	Pan-STARRS 1	·	1.4 km	MPC · JPL
778725	2010 VY_{242}	—	December 9, 2015	Mount Lemmon	Mount Lemmon Survey	·	1.8 km	MPC · JPL
778726	2010 VZ_{245}	—	August 27, 2014	Haleakala	Pan-STARRS 1	·	1.3 km	MPC · JPL
778727	2010 VM_{247}	—	November 7, 2010	Mount Lemmon	Mount Lemmon Survey	·	1.5 km	MPC · JPL
778728	2010 VP_{247}	—	August 23, 2014	Haleakala	Pan-STARRS 1	·	1.3 km	MPC · JPL
778729	2010 VH_{248}	—	November 1, 2010	Mount Lemmon	Mount Lemmon Survey	HOF	1.7 km	MPC · JPL
778730	2010 VT_{248}	—	November 2, 2010	Mount Lemmon	Mount Lemmon Survey	·	1.9 km	MPC · JPL
778731	2010 VE_{252}	—	November 7, 2010	Mount Lemmon	Mount Lemmon Survey	·	1.1 km	MPC · JPL
778732	2010 VO_{252}	—	November 10, 2010	Mount Lemmon	Mount Lemmon Survey	·	1.3 km	MPC · JPL
778733	2010 VM_{256}	—	November 4, 2010	Mount Lemmon	Mount Lemmon Survey	·	1.7 km	MPC · JPL
778734	2010 VS_{256}	—	November 8, 2010	Kitt Peak	Spacewatch	L4	6.0 km	MPC · JPL
778735	2010 VM_{257}	—	November 2, 2010	Mount Lemmon	Mount Lemmon Survey	L4 · ERY	6.5 km	MPC · JPL
778736	2010 VP_{258}	—	November 1, 2010	Mount Lemmon	Mount Lemmon Survey	L4	5.4 km	MPC · JPL
778737	2010 VZ_{258}	—	November 1, 2010	Kitt Peak	Spacewatch	·	1.4 km	MPC · JPL
778738	2010 VA_{262}	—	November 14, 2010	Mount Lemmon	Mount Lemmon Survey	·	1.9 km	MPC · JPL
778739	2010 VP_{262}	—	November 6, 2010	Mount Lemmon	Mount Lemmon Survey	·	1.2 km	MPC · JPL
778740	2010 VB_{263}	—	November 11, 2010	Mount Lemmon	Mount Lemmon Survey	L4	5.6 km	MPC · JPL
778741	2010 VH_{264}	—	November 8, 2010	Mount Lemmon	Mount Lemmon Survey	·	1.2 km	MPC · JPL
778742	2010 VJ_{264}	—	November 2, 2010	Mount Lemmon	Mount Lemmon Survey	·	1.1 km	MPC · JPL
778743	2010 VT_{265}	—	November 1, 2010	Kitt Peak	Spacewatch	(5)	830 m	MPC · JPL
778744	2010 VW_{265}	—	November 3, 2010	Mount Lemmon	Mount Lemmon Survey	L4 · ERY	5.9 km	MPC · JPL
778745	2010 VZ_{266}	—	November 1, 2010	Mount Lemmon	Mount Lemmon Survey	·	1.1 km	MPC · JPL
778746	2010 VQ_{267}	—	November 12, 2010	Mount Lemmon	Mount Lemmon Survey	L4	6.8 km	MPC · JPL
778747	2010 VN_{271}	—	September 28, 2009	Mount Lemmon	Mount Lemmon Survey	L4	6.2 km	MPC · JPL
778748	2010 VU_{271}	—	November 2, 2010	Kitt Peak	Spacewatch	·	1.1 km	MPC · JPL
778749	2010 VX_{271}	—	November 8, 2010	Mount Lemmon	Mount Lemmon Survey	·	1.2 km	MPC · JPL
778750	2010 VE_{272}	—	November 13, 2010	Mount Lemmon	Mount Lemmon Survey	L4	5.5 km	MPC · JPL
778751	2010 VU_{273}	—	November 12, 2010	Mount Lemmon	Mount Lemmon Survey	L4	5.3 km	MPC · JPL
778752	2010 VC_{274}	—	November 12, 2010	Mount Lemmon	Mount Lemmon Survey	L4	6.5 km	MPC · JPL
778753	2010 VJ_{274}	—	November 13, 2010	Mount Lemmon	Mount Lemmon Survey	L4	5.6 km	MPC · JPL
778754	2010 VK_{274}	—	November 5, 2010	Kitt Peak	Spacewatch	L4	6.1 km	MPC · JPL
778755	2010 VP_{276}	—	November 14, 2010	Kitt Peak	Spacewatch	L4	5.3 km	MPC · JPL
778756	2010 VO_{277}	—	November 8, 2010	Mount Lemmon	Mount Lemmon Survey	L4	6.5 km	MPC · JPL
778757	2010 VG_{278}	—	November 3, 2010	Mount Lemmon	Mount Lemmon Survey	·	1.3 km	MPC · JPL
778758	2010 VX_{278}	—	November 3, 2010	Mount Lemmon	Mount Lemmon Survey	L4	5.9 km	MPC · JPL
778759	2010 VH_{279}	—	November 3, 2010	Mount Lemmon	Mount Lemmon Survey	L4	5.0 km	MPC · JPL
778760	2010 VU_{279}	—	November 3, 2010	Mount Lemmon	Mount Lemmon Survey	·	1.5 km	MPC · JPL
778761	2010 VC_{280}	—	November 10, 2010	Kitt Peak	Spacewatch	L4	6.4 km	MPC · JPL
778762	2010 VT_{280}	—	November 2, 2010	Mount Lemmon	Mount Lemmon Survey	L4 · ERY	5.0 km	MPC · JPL
778763	2010 VU_{280}	—	November 11, 2010	Mount Lemmon	Mount Lemmon Survey	L4	6.9 km	MPC · JPL
778764	2010 VX_{280}	—	November 10, 2010	Mount Lemmon	Mount Lemmon Survey	L4	5.4 km	MPC · JPL
778765	2010 VG_{282}	—	November 6, 2010	Mount Lemmon	Mount Lemmon Survey	·	1.3 km	MPC · JPL
778766	2010 VF_{283}	—	November 13, 2010	Mount Lemmon	Mount Lemmon Survey	·	1.2 km	MPC · JPL
778767	2010 VT_{285}	—	November 3, 2010	Kitt Peak	Spacewatch	L4	7.3 km	MPC · JPL
778768	2010 VV_{285}	—	November 14, 2010	Kitt Peak	Spacewatch	·	1.4 km	MPC · JPL
778769	2010 VZ_{286}	—	November 3, 2010	Mount Lemmon	Mount Lemmon Survey	·	1.2 km	MPC · JPL
778770	2010 WZ_{1}	—	November 26, 2010	Mount Lemmon	Mount Lemmon Survey	KOR	930 m	MPC · JPL
778771	2010 WX_{5}	—	November 27, 2010	Mount Lemmon	Mount Lemmon Survey	AGN	810 m	MPC · JPL
778772	2010 WB_{18}	—	November 27, 2010	Mount Lemmon	Mount Lemmon Survey	·	870 m	MPC · JPL
778773	2010 WF_{18}	—	November 27, 2010	Mount Lemmon	Mount Lemmon Survey	L4 · HEK	6.7 km	MPC · JPL
778774	2010 WB_{19}	—	November 27, 2010	Mount Lemmon	Mount Lemmon Survey	·	1.1 km	MPC · JPL
778775	2010 WR_{20}	—	November 27, 2010	Mount Lemmon	Mount Lemmon Survey	·	1.2 km	MPC · JPL
778776	2010 WS_{20}	—	November 13, 2010	Kitt Peak	Spacewatch	·	1.4 km	MPC · JPL
778777	2010 WH_{24}	—	October 14, 2010	Mount Lemmon	Mount Lemmon Survey	L4 · HEK	6.7 km	MPC · JPL
778778	2010 WW_{25}	—	November 27, 2010	Mount Lemmon	Mount Lemmon Survey	·	1.2 km	MPC · JPL
778779	2010 WD_{26}	—	November 10, 2010	Mount Lemmon	Mount Lemmon Survey	·	1.2 km	MPC · JPL
778780	2010 WM_{26}	—	November 27, 2010	Mount Lemmon	Mount Lemmon Survey	·	1.3 km	MPC · JPL
778781	2010 WG_{30}	—	November 27, 2010	Mount Lemmon	Mount Lemmon Survey	L4	4.9 km	MPC · JPL
778782	2010 WC_{39}	—	November 8, 2010	Mount Lemmon	Mount Lemmon Survey	L4 · 006	6.5 km	MPC · JPL
778783	2010 WK_{39}	—	November 27, 2010	Mount Lemmon	Mount Lemmon Survey	·	1.5 km	MPC · JPL
778784	2010 WE_{40}	—	November 3, 2010	Kitt Peak	Spacewatch	·	1.1 km	MPC · JPL
778785	2010 WE_{44}	—	November 27, 2010	Mount Lemmon	Mount Lemmon Survey	·	1.2 km	MPC · JPL
778786	2010 WS_{44}	—	October 13, 2010	Mount Lemmon	Mount Lemmon Survey	L4 · ERY	6.3 km	MPC · JPL
778787	2010 WO_{50}	—	November 28, 2010	Kitt Peak	Spacewatch	DOR	1.8 km	MPC · JPL
778788	2010 WY_{52}	—	November 28, 2010	Mount Lemmon	Mount Lemmon Survey	·	1.3 km	MPC · JPL
778789	2010 WJ_{53}	—	November 28, 2010	Mount Lemmon	Mount Lemmon Survey	·	1.2 km	MPC · JPL
778790	2010 WH_{54}	—	November 11, 2010	Kitt Peak	Spacewatch	HNS	990 m	MPC · JPL
778791	2010 WZ_{56}	—	November 30, 2010	Mount Lemmon	Mount Lemmon Survey	(13314)	1.2 km	MPC · JPL
778792	2010 WZ_{76}	—	August 31, 2014	Haleakala	Pan-STARRS 1	·	1.5 km	MPC · JPL
778793	2010 WF_{77}	—	November 25, 2010	Mount Lemmon	Mount Lemmon Survey	·	1.1 km	MPC · JPL
778794	2010 WP_{78}	—	November 27, 2010	Mount Lemmon	Mount Lemmon Survey	·	1.4 km	MPC · JPL
778795	2010 WQ_{79}	—	November 28, 2010	Mount Lemmon	Mount Lemmon Survey	·	1.3 km	MPC · JPL
778796	2010 WC_{80}	—	November 26, 2010	Mount Lemmon	Mount Lemmon Survey	L4	6.7 km	MPC · JPL
778797	2010 XT_{6}	—	November 12, 2010	Mount Lemmon	Mount Lemmon Survey	·	1.6 km	MPC · JPL
778798	2010 XQ_{8}	—	November 6, 2010	Mount Lemmon	Mount Lemmon Survey	L4	6.0 km	MPC · JPL
778799	2010 XX_{14}	—	December 4, 2010	Mount Lemmon	Mount Lemmon Survey	·	2.4 km	MPC · JPL
778800	2010 XX_{19}	—	November 13, 2010	Mount Lemmon	Mount Lemmon Survey	·	3.0 km	MPC · JPL

== 778801–778900 ==
back to top

Designation			Discovery			Properties		Ref
Permanent	Provisional	Named after	Date	Site	Discoverer(s)	Category	Diam.	Ref
778801	2010 XO_{24}	—	December 2, 2010	Catalina	CSS	EUN	980 m	MPC · JPL
778802	2010 XO_{27}	—	November 10, 2010	Kitt Peak	Spacewatch	MIS	1.8 km	MPC · JPL
778803	2010 XM_{41}	—	August 8, 2004	Siding Spring	SSS	·	2.4 km	MPC · JPL
778804	2010 XA_{43}	—	November 14, 2010	Mount Lemmon	Mount Lemmon Survey	·	1.1 km	MPC · JPL
778805	2010 XD_{43}	—	November 27, 2010	Mount Lemmon	Mount Lemmon Survey	L4	5.3 km	MPC · JPL
778806	2010 XF_{55}	—	December 10, 2010	Mount Lemmon	Mount Lemmon Survey	L4	6.1 km	MPC · JPL
778807	2010 XH_{59}	—	December 8, 2010	Kitt Peak	Spacewatch	·	1.4 km	MPC · JPL
778808	2010 XO_{74}	—	November 8, 2010	Mount Lemmon	Mount Lemmon Survey	·	1.8 km	MPC · JPL
778809	2010 XG_{76}	—	July 16, 2004	Cerro Tololo	Deep Ecliptic Survey	·	1.8 km	MPC · JPL
778810	2010 XK_{82}	—	December 3, 2010	Mount Lemmon	Mount Lemmon Survey	·	1.0 km	MPC · JPL
778811	2010 XQ_{90}	—	November 28, 2010	Mount Lemmon	Mount Lemmon Survey	KOR	920 m	MPC · JPL
778812	2010 XH_{92}	—	December 14, 2010	Mount Lemmon	Mount Lemmon Survey	·	1.4 km	MPC · JPL
778813	2010 XQ_{92}	—	December 6, 2010	Mount Lemmon	Mount Lemmon Survey	·	1.6 km	MPC · JPL
778814	2010 XL_{93}	—	December 14, 2010	Mount Lemmon	Mount Lemmon Survey	THM	1.7 km	MPC · JPL
778815	2010 XG_{96}	—	December 5, 2010	Mount Lemmon	Mount Lemmon Survey	·	1.7 km	MPC · JPL
778816	2010 XO_{97}	—	July 1, 2013	Haleakala	Pan-STARRS 1	·	1.4 km	MPC · JPL
778817	2010 XS_{100}	—	December 14, 2010	Mount Lemmon	Mount Lemmon Survey	·	1.5 km	MPC · JPL
778818	2010 XE_{101}	—	December 3, 2010	Mount Lemmon	Mount Lemmon Survey	·	1.1 km	MPC · JPL
778819	2010 XJ_{102}	—	October 3, 2014	Mount Lemmon	Mount Lemmon Survey	·	1.3 km	MPC · JPL
778820	2010 XK_{103}	—	April 15, 2013	Haleakala	Pan-STARRS 1	·	1.4 km	MPC · JPL
778821	2010 XK_{104}	—	February 26, 2012	Mount Lemmon	Mount Lemmon Survey	·	1.6 km	MPC · JPL
778822	2010 XS_{104}	—	August 4, 2014	Haleakala	Pan-STARRS 1	·	1.6 km	MPC · JPL
778823	2010 XW_{104}	—	November 17, 2014	Mount Lemmon	Mount Lemmon Survey	MAR	760 m	MPC · JPL
778824	2010 XY_{104}	—	June 3, 2013	Mount Lemmon	Mount Lemmon Survey	MAR	950 m	MPC · JPL
778825	2010 XB_{106}	—	August 27, 2014	Haleakala	Pan-STARRS 1	KOR	980 m	MPC · JPL
778826	2010 XU_{106}	—	December 2, 2010	Mount Lemmon	Mount Lemmon Survey	L4	5.7 km	MPC · JPL
778827	2010 XH_{107}	—	August 22, 2014	Haleakala	Pan-STARRS 1	·	980 m	MPC · JPL
778828	2010 XJ_{107}	—	January 8, 2016	Haleakala	Pan-STARRS 1	·	1.3 km	MPC · JPL
778829	2010 XC_{108}	—	December 13, 2015	Haleakala	Pan-STARRS 1	·	1.2 km	MPC · JPL
778830	2010 XM_{108}	—	January 31, 2016	Haleakala	Pan-STARRS 1	·	1.3 km	MPC · JPL
778831	2010 XN_{109}	—	December 13, 2010	Mauna Kea	M. Micheli, L. Wells	EOS	1.3 km	MPC · JPL
778832	2010 XZ_{109}	—	December 3, 2010	Mount Lemmon	Mount Lemmon Survey	HOF	1.8 km	MPC · JPL
778833	2010 XG_{110}	—	December 8, 2010	Mount Lemmon	Mount Lemmon Survey	·	1.7 km	MPC · JPL
778834	2010 XP_{110}	—	December 14, 2010	Mount Lemmon	Mount Lemmon Survey	·	1.4 km	MPC · JPL
778835	2010 XA_{116}	—	December 4, 2010	Mount Lemmon	Mount Lemmon Survey	·	1.3 km	MPC · JPL
778836	2010 XV_{116}	—	December 4, 2010	Mount Lemmon	Mount Lemmon Survey	·	2.4 km	MPC · JPL
778837	2010 XW_{116}	—	December 14, 2010	Mount Lemmon	Mount Lemmon Survey	·	2.1 km	MPC · JPL
778838	2010 XD_{117}	—	December 2, 2010	Mount Lemmon	Mount Lemmon Survey	L4	6.4 km	MPC · JPL
778839	2010 XJ_{117}	—	December 13, 2010	Mount Lemmon	Mount Lemmon Survey	(12739)	1.2 km	MPC · JPL
778840	2010 XS_{118}	—	December 3, 2010	Mount Lemmon	Mount Lemmon Survey	L4	5.7 km	MPC · JPL
778841	2010 XP_{119}	—	December 1, 2010	Mount Lemmon	Mount Lemmon Survey	L4	5.8 km	MPC · JPL
778842	2010 XY_{121}	—	December 4, 2010	Mount Lemmon	Mount Lemmon Survey	L4	5.6 km	MPC · JPL
778843	2010 XK_{123}	—	December 6, 2010	Mount Lemmon	Mount Lemmon Survey	HOF	1.9 km	MPC · JPL
778844	2010 XN_{123}	—	December 5, 2010	Mount Lemmon	Mount Lemmon Survey	·	1.4 km	MPC · JPL
778845	2010 XP_{123}	—	December 3, 2010	Mount Lemmon	Mount Lemmon Survey	·	1.3 km	MPC · JPL
778846	2010 XY_{123}	—	December 13, 2010	Mauna Kea	M. Micheli, L. Wells	·	1.3 km	MPC · JPL
778847	2010 XH_{124}	—	December 13, 2010	Mount Lemmon	Mount Lemmon Survey	L4	5.6 km	MPC · JPL
778848	2010 XR_{124}	—	December 5, 2010	Mount Lemmon	Mount Lemmon Survey	·	1.6 km	MPC · JPL
778849	2010 XT_{124}	—	December 2, 2010	Mount Lemmon	Mount Lemmon Survey	·	1.2 km	MPC · JPL
778850	2011 AZ_{4}	—	December 25, 2010	Mount Lemmon	Mount Lemmon Survey	·	2.3 km	MPC · JPL
778851	2011 AZ_{5}	—	December 30, 2010	Piszkés-tető	K. Sárneczky, Z. Kuli	·	1.2 km	MPC · JPL
778852	2011 AM_{24}	—	January 11, 2011	Catalina	CSS	AMO · APO · PHA	510 m	MPC · JPL
778853	2011 AM_{28}	—	January 11, 2011	Kitt Peak	Spacewatch	EOS	1.4 km	MPC · JPL
778854	2011 AH_{59}	—	January 12, 2011	Mount Lemmon	Mount Lemmon Survey	EOS	1.7 km	MPC · JPL
778855	2011 AO_{60}	—	November 16, 2010	Mount Lemmon	Mount Lemmon Survey	·	1.2 km	MPC · JPL
778856	2011 AP_{67}	—	January 3, 2011	Mount Lemmon	Mount Lemmon Survey	HOF	2.1 km	MPC · JPL
778857	2011 AX_{69}	—	January 13, 2011	Mount Lemmon	Mount Lemmon Survey	·	1.3 km	MPC · JPL
778858	2011 AB_{74}	—	January 4, 2011	Mount Lemmon	Mount Lemmon Survey	·	1.3 km	MPC · JPL
778859	2011 AS_{85}	—	August 3, 2014	Haleakala	Pan-STARRS 1	KOR	1.1 km	MPC · JPL
778860	2011 AL_{86}	—	April 27, 2012	Haleakala	Pan-STARRS 1	·	2.2 km	MPC · JPL
778861	2011 AL_{87}	—	January 2, 2011	Mount Lemmon	Mount Lemmon Survey	·	1.3 km	MPC · JPL
778862	2011 AS_{87}	—	November 18, 2015	Haleakala	Pan-STARRS 1	·	1.7 km	MPC · JPL
778863	2011 AD_{88}	—	January 5, 2011	Catalina	CSS	·	1.1 km	MPC · JPL
778864	2011 AK_{88}	—	January 8, 2011	Mount Lemmon	Mount Lemmon Survey	·	1.1 km	MPC · JPL
778865	2011 AX_{88}	—	January 8, 2011	Mount Lemmon	Mount Lemmon Survey	·	1.8 km	MPC · JPL
778866	2011 AN_{90}	—	January 4, 2011	Mount Lemmon	Mount Lemmon Survey	DOR	1.6 km	MPC · JPL
778867	2011 AP_{91}	—	January 14, 2011	Mount Lemmon	Mount Lemmon Survey	·	1.8 km	MPC · JPL
778868	2011 AN_{92}	—	January 9, 2011	Mount Lemmon	Mount Lemmon Survey	·	1.3 km	MPC · JPL
778869	2011 AO_{92}	—	October 3, 2014	Mount Lemmon	Mount Lemmon Survey	·	1.6 km	MPC · JPL
778870	2011 AP_{92}	—	September 2, 2014	Haleakala	Pan-STARRS 1	EOS	1.3 km	MPC · JPL
778871	2011 AW_{92}	—	February 6, 2016	Mount Lemmon	Mount Lemmon Survey	·	1.4 km	MPC · JPL
778872	2011 AG_{93}	—	March 7, 2016	Haleakala	Pan-STARRS 1	·	1.3 km	MPC · JPL
778873	2011 AM_{93}	—	November 13, 2014	Calar Alto	Calar Alto	·	1.2 km	MPC · JPL
778874	2011 AT_{95}	—	January 13, 2011	Mount Lemmon	Mount Lemmon Survey	·	1.5 km	MPC · JPL
778875	2011 AC_{96}	—	January 15, 2011	Mount Lemmon	Mount Lemmon Survey	·	1.5 km	MPC · JPL
778876	2011 AM_{98}	—	January 4, 2011	Mount Lemmon	Mount Lemmon Survey	AGN	900 m	MPC · JPL
778877	2011 AQ_{100}	—	January 2, 2011	Mount Lemmon	Mount Lemmon Survey	·	1.5 km	MPC · JPL
778878	2011 AW_{100}	—	January 11, 2011	Mount Lemmon	Mount Lemmon Survey	·	1.5 km	MPC · JPL
778879	2011 AV_{101}	—	January 10, 2011	Mount Lemmon	Mount Lemmon Survey	·	1.4 km	MPC · JPL
778880	2011 AD_{102}	—	January 14, 2011	Mount Lemmon	Mount Lemmon Survey	AGN	870 m	MPC · JPL
778881	2011 AJ_{102}	—	January 14, 2011	Mount Lemmon	Mount Lemmon Survey	·	1.5 km	MPC · JPL
778882	2011 AU_{102}	—	January 12, 2011	Mount Lemmon	Mount Lemmon Survey	·	1.5 km	MPC · JPL
778883	2011 AF_{103}	—	September 16, 2009	Kitt Peak	Spacewatch	HOF	1.9 km	MPC · JPL
778884	2011 AG_{103}	—	January 2, 2011	Mount Lemmon	Mount Lemmon Survey	AEO	770 m	MPC · JPL
778885	2011 AB_{104}	—	January 8, 2011	Mount Lemmon	Mount Lemmon Survey	·	1.3 km	MPC · JPL
778886	2011 AG_{104}	—	January 9, 2011	Mount Lemmon	Mount Lemmon Survey	MIS	1.8 km	MPC · JPL
778887	2011 AN_{105}	—	January 14, 2011	Mount Lemmon	Mount Lemmon Survey	·	1.3 km	MPC · JPL
778888	2011 AV_{106}	—	January 12, 2011	Kitt Peak	Spacewatch	EOS	1.4 km	MPC · JPL
778889	2011 AB_{108}	—	January 14, 2011	Mount Lemmon	Mount Lemmon Survey	·	1.5 km	MPC · JPL
778890	2011 AY_{108}	—	January 2, 2011	Mount Lemmon	Mount Lemmon Survey	AGN	840 m	MPC · JPL
778891	2011 AD_{110}	—	January 4, 2011	Mount Lemmon	Mount Lemmon Survey	·	1.8 km	MPC · JPL
778892	2011 AM_{110}	—	January 12, 2011	Mount Lemmon	Mount Lemmon Survey	·	1.3 km	MPC · JPL
778893	2011 AN_{110}	—	January 2, 2011	Mount Lemmon	Mount Lemmon Survey	AEO	710 m	MPC · JPL
778894	2011 AD_{111}	—	January 14, 2011	Mount Lemmon	Mount Lemmon Survey	·	1.2 km	MPC · JPL
778895	2011 BU	—	January 3, 2011	Mount Lemmon	Mount Lemmon Survey	GEF	850 m	MPC · JPL
778896	2011 BS_{1}	—	January 16, 2011	Mount Lemmon	Mount Lemmon Survey	(5)	840 m	MPC · JPL
778897	2011 BJ_{3}	—	October 25, 2005	Kitt Peak	Spacewatch	·	1.3 km	MPC · JPL
778898	2011 BZ_{6}	—	January 16, 2011	Mount Lemmon	Mount Lemmon Survey	(5)	700 m	MPC · JPL
778899	2011 BB_{16}	—	January 24, 2011	Alder Springs	K. Levin, N. Teamo	·	1.6 km	MPC · JPL
778900	2011 BZ_{17}	—	January 14, 2011	Kitt Peak	Spacewatch	EOS	1.6 km	MPC · JPL

== 778901–779000 ==
back to top

Designation			Discovery			Properties		Ref
Permanent	Provisional	Named after	Date	Site	Discoverer(s)	Category	Diam.	Ref
778901	2011 BB_{21}	—	January 23, 2011	Mount Lemmon	Mount Lemmon Survey	BRA	930 m	MPC · JPL
778902	2011 BP_{21}	—	January 23, 2011	Mount Lemmon	Mount Lemmon Survey	·	1.4 km	MPC · JPL
778903	2011 BP_{35}	—	January 28, 2011	Mount Lemmon	Mount Lemmon Survey	·	1.5 km	MPC · JPL
778904	2011 BZ_{35}	—	January 28, 2011	Mount Lemmon	Mount Lemmon Survey	·	2.0 km	MPC · JPL
778905	2011 BG_{41}	—	January 30, 2011	Piszkés-tető	K. Sárneczky, Z. Kuli	·	1.9 km	MPC · JPL
778906	2011 BZ_{49}	—	January 31, 2011	Piszkés-tető	K. Sárneczky, Z. Kuli	·	1.2 km	MPC · JPL
778907	2011 BK_{57}	—	January 30, 2011	Mount Lemmon	Mount Lemmon Survey	KOR	910 m	MPC · JPL
778908	2011 BO_{57}	—	January 30, 2011	Mount Lemmon	Mount Lemmon Survey	·	1.3 km	MPC · JPL
778909	2011 BS_{58}	—	March 16, 2007	Mount Lemmon	Mount Lemmon Survey	·	1.3 km	MPC · JPL
778910	2011 BS_{62}	—	September 30, 2003	Kitt Peak	Spacewatch	·	2.3 km	MPC · JPL
778911	2011 BA_{64}	—	January 14, 2011	Kitt Peak	Spacewatch	·	1.3 km	MPC · JPL
778912	2011 BF_{70}	—	January 29, 2011	Mount Lemmon	Mount Lemmon Survey	·	1.5 km	MPC · JPL
778913	2011 BV_{80}	—	January 28, 2011	Mount Lemmon	Mount Lemmon Survey	·	1.3 km	MPC · JPL
778914	2011 BL_{84}	—	January 27, 2011	Catalina	CSS	·	1.5 km	MPC · JPL
778915	2011 BN_{88}	—	January 27, 2011	Mount Lemmon	Mount Lemmon Survey	HNS	840 m	MPC · JPL
778916	2011 BU_{93}	—	January 28, 2011	Mount Lemmon	Mount Lemmon Survey	·	2.1 km	MPC · JPL
778917	2011 BJ_{96}	—	January 8, 2011	Mount Lemmon	Mount Lemmon Survey	·	1.4 km	MPC · JPL
778918	2011 BC_{100}	—	December 14, 2010	Mount Lemmon	Mount Lemmon Survey	·	1.8 km	MPC · JPL
778919	2011 BM_{103}	—	January 27, 2011	Mount Lemmon	Mount Lemmon Survey	·	930 m	MPC · JPL
778920	2011 BY_{103}	—	December 28, 2005	Kitt Peak	Spacewatch	·	1.1 km	MPC · JPL
778921	2011 BG_{105}	—	January 28, 2011	Mount Lemmon	Mount Lemmon Survey	·	1.3 km	MPC · JPL
778922	2011 BE_{106}	—	March 9, 2002	Kitt Peak	Spacewatch	HOF	1.9 km	MPC · JPL
778923	2011 BP_{106}	—	January 29, 2011	Kitt Peak	Spacewatch	EOS	1.4 km	MPC · JPL
778924	2011 BW_{107}	—	February 5, 2011	Haleakala	Pan-STARRS 1	·	1.6 km	MPC · JPL
778925	2011 BN_{110}	—	February 5, 2011	Haleakala	Pan-STARRS 1	·	1.8 km	MPC · JPL
778926	2011 BT_{111}	—	February 25, 2011	Mount Lemmon	Mount Lemmon Survey	THM	1.7 km	MPC · JPL
778927	2011 BS_{113}	—	February 5, 2011	Haleakala	Pan-STARRS 1	·	2.1 km	MPC · JPL
778928	2011 BU_{129}	—	January 28, 2011	Mount Lemmon	Mount Lemmon Survey	·	1.1 km	MPC · JPL
778929	2011 BB_{130}	—	January 28, 2011	Mount Lemmon	Mount Lemmon Survey	·	1.4 km	MPC · JPL
778930	2011 BD_{134}	—	January 29, 2011	Mount Lemmon	Mount Lemmon Survey	·	1.5 km	MPC · JPL
778931	2011 BT_{135}	—	January 29, 2011	Mount Lemmon	Mount Lemmon Survey	·	2.3 km	MPC · JPL
778932	2011 BO_{137}	—	January 29, 2011	Mount Lemmon	Mount Lemmon Survey	·	1.4 km	MPC · JPL
778933	2011 BK_{138}	—	January 29, 2011	Mount Lemmon	Mount Lemmon Survey	·	1.3 km	MPC · JPL
778934	2011 BT_{138}	—	January 29, 2011	Mount Lemmon	Mount Lemmon Survey	·	1.3 km	MPC · JPL
778935	2011 BP_{140}	—	November 21, 2005	Kitt Peak	Spacewatch	·	1.2 km	MPC · JPL
778936	2011 BL_{141}	—	January 29, 2011	Mount Lemmon	Mount Lemmon Survey	·	1.3 km	MPC · JPL
778937	2011 BU_{141}	—	January 29, 2011	Mount Lemmon	Mount Lemmon Survey	·	1.5 km	MPC · JPL
778938	2011 BQ_{144}	—	January 29, 2011	Mount Lemmon	Mount Lemmon Survey	·	1.4 km	MPC · JPL
778939	2011 BD_{145}	—	January 29, 2011	Mount Lemmon	Mount Lemmon Survey	·	1.7 km	MPC · JPL
778940	2011 BL_{145}	—	January 29, 2011	Mount Lemmon	Mount Lemmon Survey	·	1.4 km	MPC · JPL
778941	2011 BC_{146}	—	January 29, 2011	Mount Lemmon	Mount Lemmon Survey	·	1.9 km	MPC · JPL
778942	2011 BD_{149}	—	January 29, 2011	Mount Lemmon	Mount Lemmon Survey	·	1.3 km	MPC · JPL
778943	2011 BY_{157}	—	January 13, 2011	Mount Lemmon	Mount Lemmon Survey	·	1.1 km	MPC · JPL
778944	2011 BC_{164}	—	January 16, 2011	Mount Lemmon	Mount Lemmon Survey	·	860 m	MPC · JPL
778945	2011 BC_{165}	—	February 7, 2011	Mount Lemmon	Mount Lemmon Survey	·	2.4 km	MPC · JPL
778946	2011 BM_{165}	—	March 2, 2011	Mount Lemmon	Mount Lemmon Survey	PAD	1.1 km	MPC · JPL
778947	2011 BY_{168}	—	February 7, 2011	Mount Lemmon	Mount Lemmon Survey	·	1.4 km	MPC · JPL
778948	2011 BA_{169}	—	February 7, 2011	Mount Lemmon	Mount Lemmon Survey	·	2.3 km	MPC · JPL
778949	2011 BC_{173}	—	November 20, 2014	Haleakala	Pan-STARRS 1	·	1.6 km	MPC · JPL
778950	2011 BJ_{173}	—	January 23, 2011	Mount Lemmon	Mount Lemmon Survey	HOF	1.8 km	MPC · JPL
778951	2011 BP_{173}	—	January 29, 2011	Mount Lemmon	Mount Lemmon Survey	EOS	1.3 km	MPC · JPL
778952	2011 BH_{174}	—	February 7, 2011	Mount Lemmon	Mount Lemmon Survey	·	1.4 km	MPC · JPL
778953	2011 BA_{175}	—	January 31, 2016	Haleakala	Pan-STARRS 1	·	1.9 km	MPC · JPL
778954	2011 BF_{176}	—	October 15, 2014	Kitt Peak	Spacewatch	·	1.3 km	MPC · JPL
778955	2011 BE_{177}	—	March 2, 2011	Mount Lemmon	Mount Lemmon Survey	·	1.3 km	MPC · JPL
778956	2011 BN_{177}	—	February 10, 2011	Mount Lemmon	Mount Lemmon Survey	·	1.8 km	MPC · JPL
778957	2011 BT_{179}	—	January 30, 2011	Mount Lemmon	Mount Lemmon Survey	·	1.4 km	MPC · JPL
778958	2011 BL_{180}	—	January 28, 2011	Mount Lemmon	Mount Lemmon Survey	GEF	770 m	MPC · JPL
778959	2011 BC_{182}	—	February 8, 2011	Mount Lemmon	Mount Lemmon Survey	3:2	4.1 km	MPC · JPL
778960	2011 BK_{183}	—	January 28, 2011	Mount Lemmon	Mount Lemmon Survey	·	2.5 km	MPC · JPL
778961	2011 BN_{183}	—	October 29, 2014	Haleakala	Pan-STARRS 1	·	1.7 km	MPC · JPL
778962	2011 BX_{188}	—	January 29, 2011	Mount Lemmon	Mount Lemmon Survey	·	1.6 km	MPC · JPL
778963	2011 BG_{190}	—	March 13, 2016	Mount Lemmon	Mount Lemmon Survey	·	1.3 km	MPC · JPL
778964	2011 BZ_{190}	—	January 29, 2011	Mount Lemmon	Mount Lemmon Survey	EOS	1.1 km	MPC · JPL
778965	2011 BV_{193}	—	January 29, 2011	Kitt Peak	Spacewatch	·	2.0 km	MPC · JPL
778966	2011 BS_{194}	—	January 30, 2011	Mount Lemmon	Mount Lemmon Survey	·	1.2 km	MPC · JPL
778967	2011 BU_{194}	—	January 30, 2011	Haleakala	Pan-STARRS 1	·	1.4 km	MPC · JPL
778968	2011 BD_{195}	—	January 30, 2011	Haleakala	Pan-STARRS 1	·	1.3 km	MPC · JPL
778969	2011 BE_{195}	—	January 28, 2011	Mount Lemmon	Mount Lemmon Survey	·	1.3 km	MPC · JPL
778970	2011 BP_{195}	—	January 16, 2011	Mount Lemmon	Mount Lemmon Survey	·	1.2 km	MPC · JPL
778971	2011 BW_{196}	—	January 29, 2011	Mount Lemmon	Mount Lemmon Survey	·	1.3 km	MPC · JPL
778972	2011 BP_{197}	—	January 30, 2011	Haleakala	Pan-STARRS 1	·	2.0 km	MPC · JPL
778973	2011 BX_{197}	—	January 29, 2011	Mount Lemmon	Mount Lemmon Survey	·	1.1 km	MPC · JPL
778974	2011 BM_{198}	—	January 27, 2011	Mount Lemmon	Mount Lemmon Survey	·	1.4 km	MPC · JPL
778975	2011 BV_{200}	—	January 30, 2011	Mount Lemmon	Mount Lemmon Survey	AGN	840 m	MPC · JPL
778976	2011 BP_{201}	—	January 27, 2011	Mount Lemmon	Mount Lemmon Survey	AST	1.3 km	MPC · JPL
778977	2011 BR_{201}	—	September 21, 2009	Kitt Peak	Spacewatch	·	1.3 km	MPC · JPL
778978	2011 BV_{201}	—	January 14, 2011	Kitt Peak	Spacewatch	AGN	820 m	MPC · JPL
778979	2011 BE_{202}	—	January 29, 2011	Mount Lemmon	Mount Lemmon Survey	KOR	850 m	MPC · JPL
778980	2011 BN_{202}	—	January 26, 2011	Kitt Peak	Spacewatch	·	1.3 km	MPC · JPL
778981	2011 BW_{202}	—	January 28, 2011	Mount Lemmon	Mount Lemmon Survey	HOF	1.7 km	MPC · JPL
778982	2011 BK_{207}	—	January 29, 2011	Mount Lemmon	Mount Lemmon Survey	·	1.6 km	MPC · JPL
778983	2011 BV_{207}	—	January 30, 2011	Haleakala	Pan-STARRS 1	·	1.7 km	MPC · JPL
778984	2011 BU_{208}	—	January 28, 2011	Mount Lemmon	Mount Lemmon Survey	·	3.2 km	MPC · JPL
778985	2011 BO_{209}	—	January 26, 2011	Mount Lemmon	Mount Lemmon Survey	·	1.1 km	MPC · JPL
778986	2011 BW_{209}	—	January 23, 2011	Mount Lemmon	Mount Lemmon Survey	·	1.1 km	MPC · JPL
778987	2011 BA_{210}	—	January 27, 2011	Mount Lemmon	Mount Lemmon Survey	HOF	1.7 km	MPC · JPL
778988	2011 BH_{210}	—	February 13, 2011	Mount Lemmon	Mount Lemmon Survey	·	1.2 km	MPC · JPL
778989	2011 BR_{212}	—	January 16, 2011	Mount Lemmon	Mount Lemmon Survey	·	1.2 km	MPC · JPL
778990	2011 CK_{11}	—	February 5, 2011	Mount Lemmon	Mount Lemmon Survey	3:2	3.9 km	MPC · JPL
778991	2011 CK_{26}	—	February 5, 2011	Catalina	CSS	·	1.9 km	MPC · JPL
778992	2011 CF_{29}	—	February 6, 2011	Mount Lemmon	Mount Lemmon Survey	GEF	670 m	MPC · JPL
778993	2011 CP_{31}	—	February 5, 2011	Kitt Peak	Spacewatch	·	1.2 km	MPC · JPL
778994	2011 CJ_{41}	—	February 8, 2011	Mount Lemmon	Mount Lemmon Survey	·	1.8 km	MPC · JPL
778995	2011 CO_{41}	—	February 8, 2011	Mount Lemmon	Mount Lemmon Survey	AGN	860 m	MPC · JPL
778996	2011 CY_{41}	—	January 24, 2011	Kitt Peak	Spacewatch	·	1.6 km	MPC · JPL
778997	2011 CZ_{48}	—	January 28, 2017	Haleakala	Pan-STARRS 1	·	2.3 km	MPC · JPL
778998	2011 CV_{51}	—	February 7, 2011	Mount Lemmon	Mount Lemmon Survey	AST	1.2 km	MPC · JPL
778999	2011 CP_{55}	—	February 8, 2011	Mount Lemmon	Mount Lemmon Survey	KOR	850 m	MPC · JPL
779000	2011 CF_{61}	—	February 8, 2011	Mount Lemmon	Mount Lemmon Survey	VER	1.9 km	MPC · JPL

back to top
