= (445473) 2010 VZ98 =

Trans-Neptunian object

(445473) 2010 VZ_{98}
Discovery
- Discovered by: D. L. Rabinowitz; M. E. Schwamb; S. Tourtellotte
- Discovery site: La Silla Obs.
- Discovery date: 11 November 2010

Designations
- Minor planet category: TNO · SDO

Orbital characteristics
- Epoch 4 September 2017 (JD 2458000.5)
- Uncertainty parameter 2
- Observation arc: 16.90 yr (6,171 days)
- Aphelion: 266.63 AU
- Perihelion: 34.333 AU
- Semi-major axis: 150.48 AU
- Eccentricity: 0.7719
- Orbital period (sidereal): 1846.03 yr (674,262 d)
- Mean anomaly: 358.00°
- Mean motion: 0° 0^{m} 1.8^{s} / day
- Inclination: 4.5110°
- Longitude of ascending node: 117.39°
- Time of perihelion: ≈ 3 December 2027
- Argument of perihelion: 313.88°
- Known satellites: 0

Physical characteristics
- Mean diameter: 401.3 km (calculated); 443 km (calculated); 471 km (calculated)
- Synodic rotation period: 9.72±0.05 h
- Geometric albedo: 0.07 (assumed); 0.09 (assumed); 0.10 (assumed)
- Temperature: 46.8 K (perihelion)
- Spectral type: C B–V = 1.100±0.040; V–R = 0.670±0.020
- Absolute magnitude (H): 4.81±0.04 (S) · 5.0; 5.1 · 5.27 · 5.3

(445473) 2010 VZ_{98} is a trans-Neptunian object of the scattered disc, orbiting the Sun in the outermost region of the Solar System. It has a diameter of approximately 400 to 500 kilometers.

It was discovered on 11 November 2010, by American astronomers David Rabinowitz, Megan Schwamb and Suzanne Tourtellotte at ESO's La Silla Observatory site in northern Chile, when it was 38 AU from the Sun.

== Orbit and classification ==
2010 VZ_{98} orbits the Sun at a distance of 34.3–266.6 AU once every 1846 years (674,262 days; semi-major axis of 150.5 AU). Its orbit has a high eccentricity of 0.77 and an inclination of 5° with respect to the ecliptic. Small number statistics suggest that this body may be trapped in a 3:2 orbital resonance with an unseen planet beyond Neptune with a semi-major axis of 195–215 AU. The first precovery was taken by the Sloan Digital Sky Survey at the Apache Point Observatory in 1998, extending the body's observation arc by 12 years prior to its discovery. The precoveries were found in May 2015 (MPS 604632).

== Physical characteristics ==
A rotational lightcurve of 2010 VZ_{98} was obtained from photometric observation by members of the Carnegie Institution for Science at Las Campanas Observatory, Chile. The light-curve gave a rotation period of 9.72±0.05 hours with a brightness variation of 0.18 magnitude (U=n.a.).

=== Diameter and albedo ===
While American astronomer Michael E. Brown assumes a diameter of 471 kilometers and an albedo of 0.07, Johnston's Archive estimates a diameter of 443 kilometers with generic albedo of 0.09. The Collaborative Asteroid Lightcurve Link assumes an albedo of 0.10 and calculates a diameter of 401 kilometers. These estimates are based on an absolute magnitude between 5.0 and 5.3.

== Naming ==
As of 2025, this minor planet remains unnamed.

== See also ==
- List of Solar System objects by greatest aphelion
