= Suzanne W. Tourtellotte =

American astronomer

Suzanne Tourtellotte
- Born: 11 January 1945
- Died: June 20, 2013 (aged 68)
- Education: MIT, Yale University; Princeton University
- Known for: co-discovery of 15 numbered minor planets, among them (316179) 2010 EN65
- Scientific career
- Fields: Planetary astronomy

Suzanne W. Tourtellotte (January 11, 1945 – June 20, 2013) was an American astronomer and discoverer of minor planets, a researcher at Yale University in the United States.

== Biography ==
Tourtellotte graduated from MIT in 1966, and received an M.S. degree from Yale University in 1967. She continued to study for a Ph.D. in biochemistry from Princeton University in 1971.

From 1998, Tourtellote was the data manager at the Yale University department of astronomy for the YALO and SMARTS consortium. She worked with Brad Schaefer on photometry of the moon Nereid. In 2003 together with David L. Rabinowitz, Brad and Martha Schaefer she studied the solar phase curves and rotation states of Kuiper belt objects. In 2013; she worked on the La Silla Observatory Quest KBO survey

Tourtellote was faculty member at Albertus Magnus College until 2008. She was a research scientist at the department of astronomy at Yale.

She died at the age of 68 in Hamden, Connecticut.

== List of discovered minor planets ==
Tourtellotte is credited by the Minor Planet Center with the co-discovery of 15 numbered minor planets made at the Chilean La Silla Observatory in 2010, in collaboration with astronomers David L. Rabinowitz and Megan E. Schwamb. Most notably are (316179) 2010 EN65 and (445473) 2010 VZ98, a Neptune trojan and a trans-Neptunian object, respectively.

Minor planets discovered: 15
(312645) 2010 EP_{65}	9 March 2010	list
(316179) 2010 EN65	7 March 2010	list
(382004) 2010 RM_{64}	9 September 2010	list
(445473) 2010 VZ98	11 November 2010	list
(471136) 2010 EO_{65}	9 March 2010	list
(471137) 2010 ET_{65}	13 March 2010	list
(471149) 2010 FB_{49}	17 March 2010	list
(471150) 2010 FC_{49}	18 March 2010	list
(471151) 2010 FD_{49}	19 March 2010	list
(471152) 2010 FE_{49}	19 March 2010	list
(471155) 2010 GF_{65}	14 April 2010	list
(471172) 2010 JC_{80}	12 May 2010	list
(471196) 2010 PK_{66}	14 August 2010	list
(471210) 2010 VW_{11}	3 November 2010	list
(499522) 2010 PL_{66}	14 August 2010	list
