= List of minor planets: 706001–707000 =

The following is a partial list of minor planets, running from minor-planet number 706001 through 707000, inclusive. The primary data for this and other partial lists is based on JPL's "Small-Body Orbital Elements" and data available from the Minor Planet Center. Critical list information is also provided by the MPC, unless otherwise specified from Lowell Observatory. A detailed description of the table's columns and additional sources are given on the main page including a complete list of every page in this series, and a statistical break-up on the dynamical classification of minor planets.

Also see the summary list of all named bodies in numerical and alphabetical order, and the corresponding naming citations for the number range of this particular list. New namings may only be added to this list after official publication, as the preannouncement of names is condemned by the Working Group for Small Bodies Nomenclature of the International Astronomical Union.

Near-Earth obj.	MBA (inner)	MBA (outer)	Centaur
Mars-crosser	MBA (middle)	Jupiter trojan	Trans-Neptunian obj.
Unclassified

== 706001–706100 ==
Designation			Discovery			Properties		Ref
Permanent	Provisional	Named after	Date	Site	Discoverer(s)	Category	Diam.	Ref
706001	2009 SJ_{404}	—	September 23, 2009	Mount Lemmon	Mount Lemmon Survey	·	2.3 km	MPC · JPL
706002	2009 SZ_{405}	—	September 29, 2009	Mount Lemmon	Mount Lemmon Survey	·	2.6 km	MPC · JPL
706003	2009 SX_{406}	—	September 17, 2009	Kitt Peak	Spacewatch	·	840 m	MPC · JPL
706004	2009 SN_{407}	—	September 19, 2009	Kitt Peak	Spacewatch	·	2.0 km	MPC · JPL
706005	2009 SD_{417}	—	September 18, 2009	Kitt Peak	Spacewatch	·	1.6 km	MPC · JPL
706006	2009 SA_{420}	—	September 20, 2009	Kitt Peak	Spacewatch	·	890 m	MPC · JPL
706007	2009 SF_{420}	—	September 26, 2009	Kitt Peak	Spacewatch	L4	6.5 km	MPC · JPL
706008	2009 SZ_{420}	—	September 22, 2009	Mount Lemmon	Mount Lemmon Survey	EOS	1.5 km	MPC · JPL
706009	2009 TL_{11}	—	October 13, 2009	Bergisch Gladbach	W. Bickel	EOS	1.8 km	MPC · JPL
706010	2009 TH_{19}	—	October 11, 2009	Mount Lemmon	Mount Lemmon Survey	EOS	1.3 km	MPC · JPL
706011	2009 TJ_{28}	—	September 18, 2009	Mount Lemmon	Mount Lemmon Survey	·	720 m	MPC · JPL
706012	2009 TF_{30}	—	October 15, 2009	Mount Lemmon	Mount Lemmon Survey	·	1.8 km	MPC · JPL
706013	2009 TG_{31}	—	July 27, 2005	Palomar	NEAT	V	560 m	MPC · JPL
706014	2009 TV_{31}	—	July 28, 2005	Palomar	NEAT	·	1.1 km	MPC · JPL
706015	2009 TR_{32}	—	October 15, 2009	Mount Lemmon	Mount Lemmon Survey	·	2.1 km	MPC · JPL
706016	2009 TU_{32}	—	September 25, 2009	Kitt Peak	Spacewatch	EOS	1.2 km	MPC · JPL
706017	2009 TO_{33}	—	September 16, 2009	Catalina	CSS	·	2.8 km	MPC · JPL
706018	2009 TY_{47}	—	September 22, 2009	Kitt Peak	Spacewatch	·	1.6 km	MPC · JPL
706019	2009 TR_{49}	—	October 14, 2009	Mount Lemmon	Mount Lemmon Survey	·	1.0 km	MPC · JPL
706020	2009 TA_{50}	—	October 15, 2009	Mount Lemmon	Mount Lemmon Survey	·	2.0 km	MPC · JPL
706021	2009 TO_{50}	—	January 2, 2011	Mount Lemmon	Mount Lemmon Survey	·	2.2 km	MPC · JPL
706022	2009 TP_{50}	—	October 12, 2009	Mount Lemmon	Mount Lemmon Survey	·	2.4 km	MPC · JPL
706023	2009 TX_{50}	—	February 25, 2012	Kitt Peak	Spacewatch	·	1.6 km	MPC · JPL
706024	2009 TH_{52}	—	September 4, 2014	Haleakala	Pan-STARRS 1	·	2.0 km	MPC · JPL
706025	2009 TV_{52}	—	March 26, 2012	Charleston	R. Holmes	·	1.4 km	MPC · JPL
706026	2009 TY_{52}	—	January 4, 2017	Haleakala	Pan-STARRS 1	·	2.8 km	MPC · JPL
706027	2009 TD_{53}	—	August 19, 2014	Haleakala	Pan-STARRS 1	·	2.1 km	MPC · JPL
706028	2009 TH_{54}	—	October 11, 2009	Charleston	R. Holmes	EOS	1.6 km	MPC · JPL
706029	2009 TP_{55}	—	October 14, 2009	Mount Lemmon	Mount Lemmon Survey	·	2.0 km	MPC · JPL
706030	2009 UV_{1}	—	October 16, 2009	Sandlot	G. Hug	·	2.4 km	MPC · JPL
706031	2009 UF_{6}	—	September 21, 2009	Mount Lemmon	Mount Lemmon Survey	·	2.6 km	MPC · JPL
706032	2009 UL_{6}	—	September 15, 2009	Kitt Peak	Spacewatch	·	1.6 km	MPC · JPL
706033	2009 UX_{6}	—	February 10, 2008	Mount Lemmon	Mount Lemmon Survey	·	980 m	MPC · JPL
706034	2009 UY_{6}	—	September 25, 2009	Kitt Peak	Spacewatch	·	820 m	MPC · JPL
706035	2009 UR_{8}	—	September 28, 2009	Mount Lemmon	Mount Lemmon Survey	·	2.3 km	MPC · JPL
706036	2009 UO_{9}	—	October 16, 2009	Mount Lemmon	Mount Lemmon Survey	EOS	1.4 km	MPC · JPL
706037	2009 UZ_{10}	—	January 26, 2006	Mount Lemmon	Mount Lemmon Survey	·	2.4 km	MPC · JPL
706038	2009 UE_{11}	—	January 22, 2015	Haleakala	Pan-STARRS 1	·	660 m	MPC · JPL
706039	2009 US_{11}	—	March 10, 2003	Palomar	NEAT	·	940 m	MPC · JPL
706040	2009 UG_{15}	—	September 27, 2009	Kitt Peak	Spacewatch	·	1.7 km	MPC · JPL
706041	2009 UF_{20}	—	October 22, 2009	Sierra Stars	Dillon, W. G.	·	1.9 km	MPC · JPL
706042	2009 UC_{23}	—	October 17, 2009	Mount Lemmon	Mount Lemmon Survey	·	2.9 km	MPC · JPL
706043	2009 UR_{24}	—	October 18, 2009	Mount Lemmon	Mount Lemmon Survey	·	1.3 km	MPC · JPL
706044	2009 UU_{24}	—	October 18, 2009	Mount Lemmon	Mount Lemmon Survey	EOS	1.5 km	MPC · JPL
706045	2009 UO_{27}	—	October 21, 2009	Mount Lemmon	Mount Lemmon Survey	KOR	1.2 km	MPC · JPL
706046	2009 UH_{31}	—	October 18, 2009	Mount Lemmon	Mount Lemmon Survey	·	2.0 km	MPC · JPL
706047	2009 UF_{32}	—	October 18, 2009	Mount Lemmon	Mount Lemmon Survey	EOS	1.5 km	MPC · JPL
706048	2009 UZ_{33}	—	September 18, 2009	Mount Lemmon	Mount Lemmon Survey	·	1.5 km	MPC · JPL
706049	2009 UY_{35}	—	September 17, 2009	Mount Lemmon	Mount Lemmon Survey	·	1.9 km	MPC · JPL
706050	2009 UE_{37}	—	August 29, 2005	Palomar	NEAT	V	560 m	MPC · JPL
706051	2009 UE_{38}	—	April 29, 2008	Kitt Peak	Spacewatch	·	1.1 km	MPC · JPL
706052	2009 UO_{39}	—	October 22, 2009	Kitt Peak	Spacewatch	·	3.1 km	MPC · JPL
706053	2009 UE_{42}	—	October 18, 2009	Mount Lemmon	Mount Lemmon Survey	EOS	1.4 km	MPC · JPL
706054	2009 UN_{43}	—	October 18, 2009	Mount Lemmon	Mount Lemmon Survey	·	2.2 km	MPC · JPL
706055	2009 UP_{51}	—	October 1, 2005	Mount Lemmon	Mount Lemmon Survey	·	1.1 km	MPC · JPL
706056	2009 UK_{52}	—	September 21, 2009	Mount Lemmon	Mount Lemmon Survey	EOS	1.6 km	MPC · JPL
706057	2009 UT_{52}	—	October 22, 2009	Mount Lemmon	Mount Lemmon Survey	·	2.0 km	MPC · JPL
706058	2009 UO_{55}	—	October 23, 2009	Mount Lemmon	Mount Lemmon Survey	·	1.8 km	MPC · JPL
706059	2009 UF_{58}	—	October 23, 2009	Mount Lemmon	Mount Lemmon Survey	L4	6.8 km	MPC · JPL
706060	2009 UC_{61}	—	September 28, 2009	Mount Lemmon	Mount Lemmon Survey	·	1.9 km	MPC · JPL
706061	2009 UX_{63}	—	October 17, 2009	Mount Lemmon	Mount Lemmon Survey	·	1.2 km	MPC · JPL
706062	2009 UJ_{69}	—	October 16, 2009	Mount Lemmon	Mount Lemmon Survey	·	1.2 km	MPC · JPL
706063	2009 UL_{70}	—	September 29, 2009	Mount Lemmon	Mount Lemmon Survey	·	1.9 km	MPC · JPL
706064	2009 UP_{70}	—	September 28, 2009	Mount Lemmon	Mount Lemmon Survey	L4	7.1 km	MPC · JPL
706065	2009 UR_{70}	—	October 22, 2009	Mount Lemmon	Mount Lemmon Survey	L4	8.4 km	MPC · JPL
706066	2009 UG_{76}	—	October 21, 2009	Mount Lemmon	Mount Lemmon Survey	EOS	1.6 km	MPC · JPL
706067	2009 UX_{76}	—	October 21, 2009	Mount Lemmon	Mount Lemmon Survey	EOS	1.8 km	MPC · JPL
706068	2009 UM_{77}	—	September 16, 2009	Kitt Peak	Spacewatch	·	1.9 km	MPC · JPL
706069	2009 UC_{78}	—	September 20, 2009	Kitt Peak	Spacewatch	·	1.7 km	MPC · JPL
706070	2009 UC_{79}	—	September 20, 2009	Kitt Peak	Spacewatch	·	1.5 km	MPC · JPL
706071	2009 UQ_{80}	—	September 18, 2009	Kitt Peak	Spacewatch	KOR	1.3 km	MPC · JPL
706072	2009 UY_{80}	—	September 11, 2005	Kitt Peak	Spacewatch	·	990 m	MPC · JPL
706073	2009 UO_{83}	—	October 23, 2009	Mount Lemmon	Mount Lemmon Survey	·	1.8 km	MPC · JPL
706074	2009 UO_{84}	—	October 23, 2009	Mount Lemmon	Mount Lemmon Survey	·	1.9 km	MPC · JPL
706075	2009 UW_{84}	—	October 23, 2009	Mount Lemmon	Mount Lemmon Survey	·	870 m	MPC · JPL
706076	2009 UG_{94}	—	September 23, 2009	Catalina	CSS	·	2.5 km	MPC · JPL
706077	2009 UY_{94}	—	September 19, 2009	Kitt Peak	Spacewatch	EOS	1.6 km	MPC · JPL
706078	2009 UG_{96}	—	October 22, 2009	Mount Lemmon	Mount Lemmon Survey	EUN	1.0 km	MPC · JPL
706079	2009 UV_{98}	—	September 22, 2009	Mount Lemmon	Mount Lemmon Survey	·	1.9 km	MPC · JPL
706080	2009 UA_{105}	—	October 25, 2009	Mount Lemmon	Mount Lemmon Survey	·	1.2 km	MPC · JPL
706081	2009 UF_{112}	—	October 22, 2009	Catalina	CSS	EOS	1.9 km	MPC · JPL
706082	2009 UG_{113}	—	September 19, 2009	Kitt Peak	Spacewatch	·	950 m	MPC · JPL
706083	2009 UR_{117}	—	October 22, 2009	Mount Lemmon	Mount Lemmon Survey	L4	6.0 km	MPC · JPL
706084	2009 UU_{118}	—	October 23, 2009	Mount Lemmon	Mount Lemmon Survey	·	2.3 km	MPC · JPL
706085	2009 UG_{119}	—	September 27, 2009	Kitt Peak	Spacewatch	·	1.0 km	MPC · JPL
706086	2009 UM_{124}	—	September 15, 2009	Kitt Peak	Spacewatch	L4	7.2 km	MPC · JPL
706087	2009 UN_{124}	—	April 8, 2003	Kitt Peak	Spacewatch	·	1.2 km	MPC · JPL
706088	2009 UO_{126}	—	October 26, 2009	Mount Lemmon	Mount Lemmon Survey	·	1.9 km	MPC · JPL
706089	2009 UU_{130}	—	January 13, 2016	Kitt Peak	Spacewatch	·	1.5 km	MPC · JPL
706090	2009 UU_{134}	—	October 23, 2009	Mount Lemmon	Mount Lemmon Survey	·	2.0 km	MPC · JPL
706091	2009 US_{138}	—	August 10, 2001	Palomar	NEAT	·	1.2 km	MPC · JPL
706092	2009 UO_{142}	—	October 18, 2009	Mount Lemmon	Mount Lemmon Survey	·	2.0 km	MPC · JPL
706093	2009 UE_{143}	—	April 14, 2007	Mount Lemmon	Mount Lemmon Survey	EOS	2.0 km	MPC · JPL
706094	2009 UQ_{147}	—	October 17, 2009	Mount Lemmon	Mount Lemmon Survey	EOS	1.9 km	MPC · JPL
706095	2009 UJ_{148}	—	October 22, 2009	Mount Lemmon	Mount Lemmon Survey	EOS	1.2 km	MPC · JPL
706096	2009 UR_{149}	—	October 26, 2009	Kitt Peak	Spacewatch	·	1.7 km	MPC · JPL
706097	2009 UE_{153}	—	February 21, 2006	Mount Lemmon	Mount Lemmon Survey	·	1.5 km	MPC · JPL
706098	2009 UQ_{153}	—	September 29, 2009	Mount Lemmon	Mount Lemmon Survey	·	2.4 km	MPC · JPL
706099	2009 UQ_{158}	—	September 27, 2009	Kitt Peak	Spacewatch	·	1.6 km	MPC · JPL
706100	2009 UC_{160}	—	October 23, 2009	Mount Lemmon	Mount Lemmon Survey	·	1.8 km	MPC · JPL

== 706101–706200 ==
back to top

Designation			Discovery			Properties		Ref
Permanent	Provisional	Named after	Date	Site	Discoverer(s)	Category	Diam.	Ref
706101	2009 UD_{160}	—	October 26, 2009	Mount Lemmon	Mount Lemmon Survey	·	2.0 km	MPC · JPL
706102	2009 UL_{161}	—	October 23, 2009	Mount Lemmon	Mount Lemmon Survey	·	1.7 km	MPC · JPL
706103	2009 UN_{161}	—	October 23, 2009	Mount Lemmon	Mount Lemmon Survey	·	2.5 km	MPC · JPL
706104	2009 UQ_{161}	—	October 21, 2009	Catalina	CSS	·	1.9 km	MPC · JPL
706105	2009 UR_{161}	—	February 10, 2011	Mount Lemmon	Mount Lemmon Survey	·	2.1 km	MPC · JPL
706106	2009 UU_{161}	—	April 1, 2012	Mount Lemmon	Mount Lemmon Survey	EOS	1.6 km	MPC · JPL
706107	2009 UQ_{162}	—	August 28, 2014	Haleakala	Pan-STARRS 1	·	3.0 km	MPC · JPL
706108	2009 UT_{162}	—	September 28, 2013	Mount Lemmon	Mount Lemmon Survey	·	760 m	MPC · JPL
706109	2009 UB_{163}	—	April 18, 2015	Mount Lemmon	Mount Lemmon Survey	·	680 m	MPC · JPL
706110	2009 UQ_{163}	—	December 22, 2016	Haleakala	Pan-STARRS 1	·	2.8 km	MPC · JPL
706111	2009 UW_{166}	—	October 27, 2009	Mount Lemmon	Mount Lemmon Survey	·	1.8 km	MPC · JPL
706112	2009 UX_{166}	—	October 16, 2009	Catalina	CSS	·	1.6 km	MPC · JPL
706113	2009 UH_{167}	—	October 18, 2009	Mount Lemmon	Mount Lemmon Survey	·	580 m	MPC · JPL
706114	2009 US_{168}	—	March 29, 2012	Kitt Peak	Spacewatch	EOS	1.4 km	MPC · JPL
706115	2009 UH_{170}	—	November 12, 2010	Mount Lemmon	Mount Lemmon Survey	L4	7.9 km	MPC · JPL
706116	2009 UU_{170}	—	October 31, 2016	Mount Lemmon	Mount Lemmon Survey	·	630 m	MPC · JPL
706117	2009 UC_{173}	—	October 16, 2009	Mount Lemmon	Mount Lemmon Survey	·	2.2 km	MPC · JPL
706118	2009 UA_{175}	—	October 17, 2009	Mount Lemmon	Mount Lemmon Survey	WIT	740 m	MPC · JPL
706119	2009 UG_{176}	—	October 22, 2009	Mount Lemmon	Mount Lemmon Survey	NEM	1.7 km	MPC · JPL
706120	2009 UA_{179}	—	October 16, 2009	Mount Lemmon	Mount Lemmon Survey	VER	2.0 km	MPC · JPL
706121	2009 UR_{183}	—	October 21, 2009	Mount Lemmon	Mount Lemmon Survey	EOS	1.4 km	MPC · JPL
706122	2009 UT_{184}	—	October 18, 2009	Mount Lemmon	Mount Lemmon Survey	·	2.1 km	MPC · JPL
706123	2009 UK_{185}	—	October 24, 2009	Kitt Peak	Spacewatch	(5)	890 m	MPC · JPL
706124	2009 UU_{186}	—	October 16, 2009	Mount Lemmon	Mount Lemmon Survey	·	910 m	MPC · JPL
706125	2009 UM_{187}	—	October 16, 2009	Mount Lemmon	Mount Lemmon Survey	·	2.7 km	MPC · JPL
706126	2009 VL_{4}	—	September 22, 2009	Mount Lemmon	Mount Lemmon Survey	·	2.0 km	MPC · JPL
706127	2009 VM_{10}	—	November 8, 2009	Mount Lemmon	Mount Lemmon Survey	EOS	1.7 km	MPC · JPL
706128	2009 VZ_{12}	—	October 23, 2009	Kitt Peak	Spacewatch	·	2.4 km	MPC · JPL
706129	2009 VR_{13}	—	October 24, 2009	Kitt Peak	Spacewatch	·	1.1 km	MPC · JPL
706130	2009 VQ_{15}	—	September 22, 2009	Mount Lemmon	Mount Lemmon Survey	TIR	2.2 km	MPC · JPL
706131	2009 VE_{17}	—	November 8, 2009	Kitt Peak	Spacewatch	·	1.1 km	MPC · JPL
706132	2009 VK_{17}	—	October 23, 2009	Kitt Peak	Spacewatch	THM	1.9 km	MPC · JPL
706133	2009 VL_{20}	—	September 21, 2009	Mount Lemmon	Mount Lemmon Survey	·	2.7 km	MPC · JPL
706134	2009 VK_{22}	—	November 9, 2009	Mount Lemmon	Mount Lemmon Survey	·	1.7 km	MPC · JPL
706135	2009 VE_{27}	—	November 8, 2009	Kitt Peak	Spacewatch	·	490 m	MPC · JPL
706136	2009 VQ_{30}	—	November 9, 2009	Mount Lemmon	Mount Lemmon Survey	·	970 m	MPC · JPL
706137	2009 VQ_{34}	—	August 27, 2005	Kitt Peak	Spacewatch	·	980 m	MPC · JPL
706138	2009 VV_{34}	—	November 10, 2009	Mount Lemmon	Mount Lemmon Survey	·	1.7 km	MPC · JPL
706139	2009 VQ_{35}	—	November 10, 2009	Mount Lemmon	Mount Lemmon Survey	VER	2.0 km	MPC · JPL
706140	2009 VE_{36}	—	September 21, 2009	Mount Lemmon	Mount Lemmon Survey	EOS	1.5 km	MPC · JPL
706141	2009 VG_{36}	—	November 10, 2009	Mount Lemmon	Mount Lemmon Survey	VER	2.1 km	MPC · JPL
706142	2009 VZ_{40}	—	October 23, 2009	Kitt Peak	Spacewatch	H	420 m	MPC · JPL
706143	2009 VD_{41}	—	September 22, 2009	Mount Lemmon	Mount Lemmon Survey	·	2.7 km	MPC · JPL
706144	2009 VU_{43}	—	October 24, 2009	Kitt Peak	Spacewatch	·	2.9 km	MPC · JPL
706145	2009 VS_{46}	—	November 9, 2009	Mount Lemmon	Mount Lemmon Survey	·	1.3 km	MPC · JPL
706146	2009 VP_{49}	—	September 16, 2009	Mount Lemmon	Mount Lemmon Survey	EOS	1.6 km	MPC · JPL
706147	2009 VR_{56}	—	November 11, 2009	Mount Lemmon	Mount Lemmon Survey	KOR	970 m	MPC · JPL
706148	2009 VK_{63}	—	October 30, 2009	Mount Lemmon	Mount Lemmon Survey	THM	2.1 km	MPC · JPL
706149	2009 VU_{65}	—	October 26, 2009	Kitt Peak	Spacewatch	·	2.5 km	MPC · JPL
706150	2009 VE_{69}	—	November 9, 2009	Kitt Peak	Spacewatch	·	2.3 km	MPC · JPL
706151	2009 VS_{71}	—	October 23, 2009	Mount Lemmon	Mount Lemmon Survey	·	2.0 km	MPC · JPL
706152	2009 VO_{79}	—	September 19, 2003	Anderson Mesa	LONEOS	TIR	2.9 km	MPC · JPL
706153	2009 VP_{83}	—	November 9, 2009	Kitt Peak	Spacewatch	·	2.0 km	MPC · JPL
706154	2009 VV_{86}	—	November 10, 2009	Kitt Peak	Spacewatch	EOS	1.5 km	MPC · JPL
706155	2009 VT_{87}	—	November 10, 2009	Kitt Peak	Spacewatch	·	2.6 km	MPC · JPL
706156	2009 VM_{88}	—	April 25, 2007	Kitt Peak	Spacewatch	·	2.7 km	MPC · JPL
706157	2009 VK_{89}	—	November 11, 2009	Kitt Peak	Spacewatch	EOS	1.5 km	MPC · JPL
706158	2009 VB_{91}	—	November 11, 2009	Kitt Peak	Spacewatch	·	1.2 km	MPC · JPL
706159	2009 VY_{99}	—	September 28, 2003	Kitt Peak	Spacewatch	·	2.4 km	MPC · JPL
706160	2009 VZ_{104}	—	November 9, 2009	Catalina	CSS	·	1.2 km	MPC · JPL
706161	2009 VG_{107}	—	November 8, 2009	Kitt Peak	Spacewatch	·	2.4 km	MPC · JPL
706162	2009 VG_{112}	—	November 9, 2009	Catalina	CSS	H	550 m	MPC · JPL
706163	2009 VC_{113}	—	November 9, 2009	Kitt Peak	Spacewatch	·	2.3 km	MPC · JPL
706164	2009 VJ_{113}	—	October 23, 2009	Mount Lemmon	Mount Lemmon Survey	·	2.2 km	MPC · JPL
706165	2009 VS_{113}	—	November 8, 2009	Mount Lemmon	Mount Lemmon Survey	·	3.1 km	MPC · JPL
706166	2009 VC_{119}	—	September 21, 2009	Mount Lemmon	Mount Lemmon Survey	EOS	1.9 km	MPC · JPL
706167	2009 VD_{119}	—	October 22, 2003	Kitt Peak	Spacewatch	VER	2.5 km	MPC · JPL
706168	2009 VG_{119}	—	November 8, 2009	Mount Lemmon	Mount Lemmon Survey	EUN	960 m	MPC · JPL
706169	2009 VP_{119}	—	November 9, 2009	Kitt Peak	Spacewatch	EUN	870 m	MPC · JPL
706170	2009 VW_{119}	—	November 10, 2009	Mount Lemmon	Mount Lemmon Survey	·	570 m	MPC · JPL
706171	2009 VF_{120}	—	March 11, 2016	Haleakala	Pan-STARRS 1	·	2.7 km	MPC · JPL
706172	2009 VH_{120}	—	November 9, 2009	Mount Lemmon	Mount Lemmon Survey	·	2.7 km	MPC · JPL
706173	2009 VK_{120}	—	October 24, 2009	Kitt Peak	Spacewatch	·	600 m	MPC · JPL
706174	2009 VA_{121}	—	November 9, 2009	Mount Lemmon	Mount Lemmon Survey	·	2.2 km	MPC · JPL
706175	2009 VO_{121}	—	November 8, 2009	Mount Lemmon	Mount Lemmon Survey	·	1.8 km	MPC · JPL
706176	2009 VJ_{122}	—	October 15, 2014	Kitt Peak	Spacewatch	NAE	1.6 km	MPC · JPL
706177	2009 VK_{122}	—	November 11, 2009	Mount Lemmon	Mount Lemmon Survey	·	1.9 km	MPC · JPL
706178	2009 VE_{123}	—	November 8, 2009	Mount Lemmon	Mount Lemmon Survey	·	1.4 km	MPC · JPL
706179	2009 VL_{124}	—	November 8, 2009	Mount Lemmon	Mount Lemmon Survey	·	2.3 km	MPC · JPL
706180	2009 VP_{124}	—	November 9, 2015	Mount Lemmon	Mount Lemmon Survey	·	2.3 km	MPC · JPL
706181	2009 VD_{125}	—	February 27, 2012	Haleakala	Pan-STARRS 1	VER	2.1 km	MPC · JPL
706182	2009 VR_{125}	—	November 10, 2009	Mount Lemmon	Mount Lemmon Survey	·	2.3 km	MPC · JPL
706183	2009 VY_{125}	—	November 9, 2009	Mount Lemmon	Mount Lemmon Survey	·	2.7 km	MPC · JPL
706184	2009 VB_{126}	—	November 8, 2009	Mount Lemmon	Mount Lemmon Survey	·	460 m	MPC · JPL
706185	2009 VC_{126}	—	November 8, 2009	Mount Lemmon	Mount Lemmon Survey	·	1.5 km	MPC · JPL
706186	2009 VG_{126}	—	November 10, 2009	Mount Lemmon	Mount Lemmon Survey	·	2.1 km	MPC · JPL
706187	2009 VJ_{126}	—	November 9, 2009	Mount Lemmon	Mount Lemmon Survey	·	500 m	MPC · JPL
706188	2009 VD_{129}	—	November 10, 2009	Mount Lemmon	Mount Lemmon Survey	·	1.8 km	MPC · JPL
706189	2009 VX_{132}	—	November 10, 2009	Kitt Peak	Spacewatch	·	1.2 km	MPC · JPL
706190	2009 VR_{134}	—	November 9, 2009	Mount Lemmon	Mount Lemmon Survey	·	2.5 km	MPC · JPL
706191	2009 WV_{2}	—	October 22, 2009	Mount Lemmon	Mount Lemmon Survey	·	1.1 km	MPC · JPL
706192	2009 WM_{7}	—	October 22, 2009	Mount Lemmon	Mount Lemmon Survey	3:2 · SHU	4.4 km	MPC · JPL
706193	2009 WO_{14}	—	July 31, 2005	Palomar	NEAT	·	760 m	MPC · JPL
706194	2009 WQ_{14}	—	November 16, 2009	Mount Lemmon	Mount Lemmon Survey	·	2.6 km	MPC · JPL
706195	2009 WZ_{16}	—	October 22, 2009	Mount Lemmon	Mount Lemmon Survey	·	2.2 km	MPC · JPL
706196	2009 WP_{18}	—	November 17, 2009	Mount Lemmon	Mount Lemmon Survey	·	2.4 km	MPC · JPL
706197	2009 WS_{27}	—	November 16, 2009	Kitt Peak	Spacewatch	·	2.2 km	MPC · JPL
706198	2009 WW_{30}	—	November 16, 2009	Kitt Peak	Spacewatch	VER	2.3 km	MPC · JPL
706199	2009 WR_{31}	—	October 30, 2009	Mount Lemmon	Mount Lemmon Survey	·	2.6 km	MPC · JPL
706200	2009 WF_{33}	—	October 24, 2003	Kitt Peak	Spacewatch	·	3.7 km	MPC · JPL

== 706201–706300 ==
back to top

Designation			Discovery			Properties		Ref
Permanent	Provisional	Named after	Date	Site	Discoverer(s)	Category	Diam.	Ref
706201	2009 WC_{35}	—	July 26, 2001	Kitt Peak	Spacewatch	V	640 m	MPC · JPL
706202	2009 WQ_{36}	—	November 17, 2009	Kitt Peak	Spacewatch	·	3.0 km	MPC · JPL
706203	2009 WC_{46}	—	April 26, 2008	Kitt Peak	Spacewatch	V	620 m	MPC · JPL
706204	2009 WY_{47}	—	March 15, 2007	Kitt Peak	Spacewatch	EOS	1.5 km	MPC · JPL
706205	2009 WR_{50}	—	October 24, 2009	Mount Lemmon	Mount Lemmon Survey	·	2.8 km	MPC · JPL
706206	2009 WU_{52}	—	November 9, 2005	Catalina	CSS	·	1.1 km	MPC · JPL
706207	2009 WK_{55}	—	October 23, 2004	Kitt Peak	Spacewatch	EOS	2.0 km	MPC · JPL
706208	2009 WP_{56}	—	October 12, 2009	Mount Lemmon	Mount Lemmon Survey	·	2.4 km	MPC · JPL
706209	2009 WU_{56}	—	November 16, 2009	Mount Lemmon	Mount Lemmon Survey	·	1.1 km	MPC · JPL
706210	2009 WF_{57}	—	November 8, 2009	Kitt Peak	Spacewatch	·	2.4 km	MPC · JPL
706211	2009 WR_{58}	—	October 27, 2009	Kitt Peak	Spacewatch	MAS	740 m	MPC · JPL
706212	2009 WP_{59}	—	November 5, 2005	Mount Lemmon	Mount Lemmon Survey	·	890 m	MPC · JPL
706213	2009 WD_{60}	—	September 4, 2008	Kitt Peak	Spacewatch	L4 · ERY	6.0 km	MPC · JPL
706214	2009 WQ_{63}	—	November 16, 2009	Mount Lemmon	Mount Lemmon Survey	·	1.7 km	MPC · JPL
706215	2009 WK_{69}	—	November 17, 2009	Mount Lemmon	Mount Lemmon Survey	·	2.9 km	MPC · JPL
706216	2009 WC_{74}	—	November 18, 2009	Kitt Peak	Spacewatch	EOS	1.7 km	MPC · JPL
706217	2009 WK_{74}	—	November 10, 2009	Kitt Peak	Spacewatch	·	2.5 km	MPC · JPL
706218	2009 WJ_{77}	—	November 18, 2009	Kitt Peak	Spacewatch	EOS	1.7 km	MPC · JPL
706219	2009 WM_{83}	—	October 24, 2003	Kitt Peak	Spacewatch	·	3.0 km	MPC · JPL
706220	2009 WV_{87}	—	November 9, 2009	Mount Lemmon	Mount Lemmon Survey	·	1.9 km	MPC · JPL
706221	2009 WF_{89}	—	November 19, 2009	Kitt Peak	Spacewatch	·	1.3 km	MPC · JPL
706222	2009 WM_{91}	—	November 19, 2009	Mount Lemmon	Mount Lemmon Survey	·	2.9 km	MPC · JPL
706223	2009 WS_{91}	—	November 19, 2009	Mount Lemmon	Mount Lemmon Survey	·	2.4 km	MPC · JPL
706224	2009 WE_{98}	—	November 21, 2009	Kitt Peak	Spacewatch	V	600 m	MPC · JPL
706225	2009 WU_{98}	—	November 21, 2009	Kitt Peak	Spacewatch	·	2.3 km	MPC · JPL
706226	2009 WM_{101}	—	October 29, 2009	Kitt Peak	Spacewatch	H	450 m	MPC · JPL
706227	2009 WG_{102}	—	July 19, 2005	Palomar	NEAT	·	1.3 km	MPC · JPL
706228	2009 WW_{102}	—	November 26, 2003	Kitt Peak	Spacewatch	·	2.9 km	MPC · JPL
706229	2009 WR_{103}	—	November 9, 2009	Mount Lemmon	Mount Lemmon Survey	·	1.0 km	MPC · JPL
706230	2009 WK_{108}	—	March 23, 2006	Mount Lemmon	Mount Lemmon Survey	·	1.9 km	MPC · JPL
706231	2009 WN_{108}	—	November 17, 2009	Mount Lemmon	Mount Lemmon Survey	·	2.0 km	MPC · JPL
706232	2009 WU_{108}	—	October 22, 2009	Mount Lemmon	Mount Lemmon Survey	·	1.9 km	MPC · JPL
706233	2009 WG_{109}	—	November 17, 2009	Mount Lemmon	Mount Lemmon Survey	·	2.9 km	MPC · JPL
706234	2009 WV_{109}	—	November 17, 2009	Mount Lemmon	Mount Lemmon Survey	·	2.6 km	MPC · JPL
706235	2009 WG_{110}	—	November 17, 2009	Mount Lemmon	Mount Lemmon Survey	KOR	1.1 km	MPC · JPL
706236	2009 WZ_{112}	—	November 10, 2009	Kitt Peak	Spacewatch	·	2.1 km	MPC · JPL
706237	2009 WD_{115}	—	September 15, 2009	Kitt Peak	Spacewatch	EOS	1.4 km	MPC · JPL
706238	2009 WG_{115}	—	September 20, 2009	Mount Lemmon	Mount Lemmon Survey	EOS	1.4 km	MPC · JPL
706239	2009 WJ_{117}	—	September 19, 2009	Mount Lemmon	Mount Lemmon Survey	·	2.1 km	MPC · JPL
706240	2009 WQ_{118}	—	October 27, 2009	Kitt Peak	Spacewatch	·	1.0 km	MPC · JPL
706241	2009 WY_{119}	—	November 20, 2009	Kitt Peak	Spacewatch	·	2.9 km	MPC · JPL
706242	2009 WB_{123}	—	November 20, 2009	Kitt Peak	Spacewatch	·	2.5 km	MPC · JPL
706243	2009 WK_{125}	—	November 20, 2009	Kitt Peak	Spacewatch	L4	6.3 km	MPC · JPL
706244	2009 WP_{127}	—	November 20, 2009	Kitt Peak	Spacewatch	EOS	1.7 km	MPC · JPL
706245	2009 WA_{128}	—	November 20, 2009	Kitt Peak	Spacewatch	·	2.8 km	MPC · JPL
706246	2009 WU_{128}	—	November 20, 2009	Mount Lemmon	Mount Lemmon Survey	·	2.3 km	MPC · JPL
706247	2009 WT_{137}	—	November 23, 2009	Catalina	CSS	JUN	880 m	MPC · JPL
706248	2009 WJ_{138}	—	November 23, 2009	Mount Lemmon	Mount Lemmon Survey	·	2.4 km	MPC · JPL
706249	2009 WQ_{140}	—	November 18, 2009	Mount Lemmon	Mount Lemmon Survey	·	1.4 km	MPC · JPL
706250	2009 WF_{141}	—	December 11, 2004	Kitt Peak	Spacewatch	·	2.1 km	MPC · JPL
706251	2009 WW_{142}	—	October 26, 2009	Kitt Peak	Spacewatch	·	1.1 km	MPC · JPL
706252	2009 WF_{145}	—	October 24, 2009	Kitt Peak	Spacewatch	·	570 m	MPC · JPL
706253	2009 WG_{147}	—	November 19, 2009	Mount Lemmon	Mount Lemmon Survey	VER	2.3 km	MPC · JPL
706254	2009 WG_{149}	—	November 19, 2009	Mount Lemmon	Mount Lemmon Survey	·	2.3 km	MPC · JPL
706255	2009 WS_{149}	—	November 19, 2009	Mount Lemmon	Mount Lemmon Survey	·	1.7 km	MPC · JPL
706256	2009 WE_{150}	—	November 19, 2009	Mount Lemmon	Mount Lemmon Survey	·	2.0 km	MPC · JPL
706257	2009 WN_{150}	—	November 19, 2009	Mount Lemmon	Mount Lemmon Survey	·	480 m	MPC · JPL
706258	2009 WR_{151}	—	October 12, 2009	Mount Lemmon	Mount Lemmon Survey	·	1.6 km	MPC · JPL
706259	2009 WQ_{157}	—	November 20, 2009	Mount Lemmon	Mount Lemmon Survey	·	2.2 km	MPC · JPL
706260	2009 WD_{159}	—	November 20, 2009	Mount Lemmon	Mount Lemmon Survey	·	920 m	MPC · JPL
706261	2009 WQ_{161}	—	November 21, 2009	Kitt Peak	Spacewatch	·	2.4 km	MPC · JPL
706262	2009 WU_{162}	—	November 21, 2009	Kitt Peak	Spacewatch	·	1.8 km	MPC · JPL
706263	2009 WR_{165}	—	November 21, 2009	Kitt Peak	Spacewatch	·	2.5 km	MPC · JPL
706264	2009 WB_{166}	—	November 21, 2009	Kitt Peak	Spacewatch	·	2.7 km	MPC · JPL
706265	2009 WE_{169}	—	November 22, 2009	Kitt Peak	Spacewatch	·	1.6 km	MPC · JPL
706266	2009 WA_{171}	—	November 22, 2009	Mount Lemmon	Mount Lemmon Survey	·	1.8 km	MPC · JPL
706267	2009 WH_{178}	—	October 25, 2009	Kitt Peak	Spacewatch	·	2.8 km	MPC · JPL
706268	2009 WL_{181}	—	April 12, 2005	Kitt Peak	Deep Ecliptic Survey	·	590 m	MPC · JPL
706269	2009 WO_{184}	—	November 18, 2009	Kitt Peak	Spacewatch	·	1.1 km	MPC · JPL
706270	2009 WU_{188}	—	November 10, 2009	Mount Lemmon	Mount Lemmon Survey	·	2.8 km	MPC · JPL
706271	2009 WL_{189}	—	September 18, 2003	Palomar	NEAT	·	2.4 km	MPC · JPL
706272	2009 WT_{191}	—	November 24, 2009	Mount Lemmon	Mount Lemmon Survey	·	2.1 km	MPC · JPL
706273	2009 WP_{192}	—	November 9, 2009	Kitt Peak	Spacewatch	·	1.1 km	MPC · JPL
706274	2009 WH_{194}	—	November 11, 2009	Kitt Peak	Spacewatch	·	1.4 km	MPC · JPL
706275	2009 WE_{199}	—	November 18, 2009	Mount Lemmon	Mount Lemmon Survey	·	1.8 km	MPC · JPL
706276	2009 WR_{199}	—	November 26, 2009	Mount Lemmon	Mount Lemmon Survey	·	980 m	MPC · JPL
706277	2009 WU_{199}	—	November 26, 2009	Mount Lemmon	Mount Lemmon Survey	·	2.5 km	MPC · JPL
706278	2009 WF_{200}	—	November 26, 2009	Mount Lemmon	Mount Lemmon Survey	·	2.6 km	MPC · JPL
706279	2009 WR_{204}	—	October 26, 2009	Kitt Peak	Spacewatch	·	1.3 km	MPC · JPL
706280	2009 WK_{205}	—	November 17, 2009	Kitt Peak	Spacewatch	·	2.5 km	MPC · JPL
706281	2009 WJ_{207}	—	November 17, 2009	Kitt Peak	Spacewatch	EOS	1.6 km	MPC · JPL
706282	2009 WV_{209}	—	November 17, 2009	Kitt Peak	Spacewatch	·	2.1 km	MPC · JPL
706283	2009 WG_{210}	—	November 18, 1998	Kitt Peak	Spacewatch	·	2.1 km	MPC · JPL
706284	2009 WR_{210}	—	November 18, 2009	Kitt Peak	Spacewatch	HYG	2.5 km	MPC · JPL
706285	2009 WS_{210}	—	August 31, 2005	Anderson Mesa	LONEOS	·	930 m	MPC · JPL
706286	2009 WJ_{212}	—	November 18, 2009	Kitt Peak	Spacewatch	·	2.8 km	MPC · JPL
706287	2009 WO_{213}	—	September 4, 2014	Haleakala	Pan-STARRS 1	·	3.0 km	MPC · JPL
706288	2009 WZ_{218}	—	October 22, 2009	Mount Lemmon	Mount Lemmon Survey	L4	7.2 km	MPC · JPL
706289	2009 WW_{222}	—	November 16, 2009	Mount Lemmon	Mount Lemmon Survey	EOS	1.7 km	MPC · JPL
706290	2009 WK_{226}	—	November 17, 2009	Mount Lemmon	Mount Lemmon Survey	·	2.2 km	MPC · JPL
706291	2009 WM_{228}	—	April 23, 2007	Mount Lemmon	Mount Lemmon Survey	·	2.0 km	MPC · JPL
706292	2009 WQ_{228}	—	November 17, 2009	Mount Lemmon	Mount Lemmon Survey	VER	2.4 km	MPC · JPL
706293	2009 WC_{229}	—	April 26, 2007	Mount Lemmon	Mount Lemmon Survey	TIR	2.6 km	MPC · JPL
706294	2009 WY_{229}	—	October 23, 2009	Mount Lemmon	Mount Lemmon Survey	EOS	1.5 km	MPC · JPL
706295	2009 WU_{230}	—	November 17, 2009	Mount Lemmon	Mount Lemmon Survey	·	1.3 km	MPC · JPL
706296	2009 WX_{230}	—	November 17, 2009	Mount Lemmon	Mount Lemmon Survey	·	1.1 km	MPC · JPL
706297	2009 WQ_{232}	—	November 17, 2009	Mount Lemmon	Mount Lemmon Survey	·	1.7 km	MPC · JPL
706298	2009 WU_{233}	—	November 18, 2009	Mount Lemmon	Mount Lemmon Survey	·	1.0 km	MPC · JPL
706299	2009 WQ_{234}	—	November 11, 2009	Kitt Peak	Spacewatch	·	2.2 km	MPC · JPL
706300	2009 WJ_{236}	—	November 10, 2009	Kitt Peak	Spacewatch	EOS	1.5 km	MPC · JPL

== 706301–706400 ==
back to top

Designation			Discovery			Properties		Ref
Permanent	Provisional	Named after	Date	Site	Discoverer(s)	Category	Diam.	Ref
706301	2009 WR_{236}	—	November 18, 2009	Kitt Peak	Spacewatch	·	2.8 km	MPC · JPL
706302	2009 WH_{237}	—	October 26, 2009	Kitt Peak	Spacewatch	VER	2.4 km	MPC · JPL
706303	2009 WC_{238}	—	November 17, 2009	Kitt Peak	Spacewatch	·	1.0 km	MPC · JPL
706304	2009 WD_{238}	—	September 24, 2008	Kitt Peak	Spacewatch	L4	5.6 km	MPC · JPL
706305	2009 WU_{238}	—	November 17, 2009	Mount Lemmon	Mount Lemmon Survey	·	2.1 km	MPC · JPL
706306	2009 WJ_{241}	—	January 17, 2005	Kitt Peak	Spacewatch	·	1.9 km	MPC · JPL
706307	2009 WA_{253}	—	November 8, 2009	Kitt Peak	Spacewatch	·	2.8 km	MPC · JPL
706308	2009 WG_{254}	—	September 19, 2014	Haleakala	Pan-STARRS 1	HYG	2.2 km	MPC · JPL
706309	2009 WY_{256}	—	April 25, 2007	Mount Lemmon	Mount Lemmon Survey	MAR	1.0 km	MPC · JPL
706310	2009 WD_{262}	—	November 18, 2009	Kitt Peak	Spacewatch	MAR	860 m	MPC · JPL
706311	2009 WM_{264}	—	November 9, 2009	Mount Lemmon	Mount Lemmon Survey	·	2.4 km	MPC · JPL
706312	2009 WM_{271}	—	November 21, 2009	Mount Lemmon	Mount Lemmon Survey	(5)	1.2 km	MPC · JPL
706313	2009 WV_{271}	—	February 7, 2011	Les Engarouines	L. Bernasconi	T_{j} (2.99) · EUP	3.3 km	MPC · JPL
706314	2009 WA_{272}	—	December 11, 2013	Mount Lemmon	Mount Lemmon Survey	HNS	950 m	MPC · JPL
706315	2009 WV_{272}	—	March 6, 2011	Mount Lemmon	Mount Lemmon Survey	·	1.4 km	MPC · JPL
706316	2009 WX_{272}	—	June 15, 2015	Haleakala	Pan-STARRS 1	·	750 m	MPC · JPL
706317	2009 WR_{273}	—	April 27, 2012	Haleakala	Pan-STARRS 1	·	1.7 km	MPC · JPL
706318	2009 WU_{273}	—	October 25, 2009	Kitt Peak	Spacewatch	·	2.7 km	MPC · JPL
706319	2009 WF_{274}	—	January 27, 2011	Mount Lemmon	Mount Lemmon Survey	·	2.6 km	MPC · JPL
706320	2009 WU_{274}	—	October 25, 2009	Kitt Peak	Spacewatch	·	1.1 km	MPC · JPL
706321	2009 WY_{278}	—	October 17, 2012	Haleakala	Pan-STARRS 1	·	800 m	MPC · JPL
706322	2009 WA_{279}	—	July 1, 2013	Haleakala	Pan-STARRS 1	·	2.4 km	MPC · JPL
706323	2009 WH_{279}	—	June 6, 2018	Haleakala	Pan-STARRS 1	·	1.9 km	MPC · JPL
706324	2009 WB_{280}	—	October 28, 2014	Haleakala	Pan-STARRS 1	·	2.6 km	MPC · JPL
706325	2009 WG_{280}	—	January 26, 2017	Haleakala	Pan-STARRS 1	EOS	1.5 km	MPC · JPL
706326	2009 WB_{281}	—	February 24, 2017	Haleakala	Pan-STARRS 1	·	2.8 km	MPC · JPL
706327	2009 WM_{281}	—	October 30, 2014	Haleakala	Pan-STARRS 1	·	2.1 km	MPC · JPL
706328	2009 WO_{282}	—	September 2, 2014	Haleakala	Pan-STARRS 1	·	1.8 km	MPC · JPL
706329	2009 WV_{283}	—	December 7, 2013	Nogales	M. Schwartz, P. R. Holvorcem	·	1.4 km	MPC · JPL
706330	2009 WZ_{283}	—	October 3, 2014	Mount Lemmon	Mount Lemmon Survey	EOS	1.6 km	MPC · JPL
706331	2009 WE_{284}	—	January 14, 2011	Kitt Peak	Spacewatch	·	2.3 km	MPC · JPL
706332	2009 WA_{285}	—	November 7, 2017	Haleakala	Pan-STARRS 1	·	1.1 km	MPC · JPL
706333	2009 WP_{285}	—	September 16, 2014	Haleakala	Pan-STARRS 1	·	1.9 km	MPC · JPL
706334	2009 WQ_{285}	—	June 28, 2015	Haleakala	Pan-STARRS 1	·	730 m	MPC · JPL
706335	2009 WR_{285}	—	March 22, 2015	Haleakala	Pan-STARRS 1	·	1.3 km	MPC · JPL
706336	2009 WW_{285}	—	December 14, 2015	Haleakala	Pan-STARRS 1	EOS	1.6 km	MPC · JPL
706337	2009 WV_{286}	—	November 25, 2009	Kitt Peak	Spacewatch	·	1.5 km	MPC · JPL
706338	2009 WY_{286}	—	September 21, 2009	Mount Lemmon	Mount Lemmon Survey	AGN	1.1 km	MPC · JPL
706339	2009 WP_{288}	—	November 27, 2009	Mount Lemmon	Mount Lemmon Survey	·	2.6 km	MPC · JPL
706340	2009 WC_{289}	—	November 26, 2009	Catalina	CSS	·	2.7 km	MPC · JPL
706341	2009 WV_{290}	—	November 16, 2009	Mount Lemmon	Mount Lemmon Survey	VER	2.2 km	MPC · JPL
706342	2009 WU_{292}	—	November 21, 2009	Kitt Peak	Spacewatch	·	2.5 km	MPC · JPL
706343	2009 WE_{293}	—	November 21, 2009	Kitt Peak	Spacewatch	·	2.5 km	MPC · JPL
706344	2009 WQ_{295}	—	November 23, 2009	Mount Lemmon	Mount Lemmon Survey	·	2.2 km	MPC · JPL
706345	2009 WA_{296}	—	November 17, 2009	Mount Lemmon	Mount Lemmon Survey	L4	6.3 km	MPC · JPL
706346	2009 WA_{299}	—	November 19, 2009	Mount Lemmon	Mount Lemmon Survey	·	900 m	MPC · JPL
706347	2009 WF_{300}	—	November 25, 2009	Kitt Peak	Spacewatch	EOS	1.4 km	MPC · JPL
706348 Montcabrer	2009 XX	Montcabrer	December 9, 2009	Cabrils	R. Naves, M. Campas	·	1.2 km	MPC · JPL
706349	2009 XA_{1}	—	November 19, 2009	Catalina	CSS	H	630 m	MPC · JPL
706350	2009 XN_{2}	—	September 21, 2003	Palomar	NEAT	·	2.8 km	MPC · JPL
706351	2009 XV_{4}	—	November 20, 2009	Kitt Peak	Spacewatch	EOS	1.8 km	MPC · JPL
706352	2009 XG_{5}	—	December 10, 2009	Mount Lemmon	Mount Lemmon Survey	·	2.9 km	MPC · JPL
706353	2009 XR_{7}	—	December 13, 2009	Nazaret	Muler, G.	·	2.8 km	MPC · JPL
706354	2009 XB_{9}	—	December 11, 2009	Mount Lemmon	Mount Lemmon Survey	·	1.5 km	MPC · JPL
706355	2009 XD_{14}	—	October 26, 2009	Kitt Peak	Spacewatch	·	830 m	MPC · JPL
706356	2009 XO_{26}	—	March 27, 2012	Kitt Peak	Spacewatch	·	2.2 km	MPC · JPL
706357	2009 XR_{26}	—	December 10, 2009	Mount Lemmon	Mount Lemmon Survey	·	890 m	MPC · JPL
706358	2009 XU_{26}	—	March 27, 2011	Mount Lemmon	Mount Lemmon Survey	·	1.1 km	MPC · JPL
706359	2009 XA_{27}	—	January 23, 2015	Haleakala	Pan-STARRS 1	·	910 m	MPC · JPL
706360	2009 XB_{27}	—	October 12, 2014	Mount Lemmon	Mount Lemmon Survey	·	2.9 km	MPC · JPL
706361	2009 XK_{27}	—	October 3, 2014	Mount Lemmon	Mount Lemmon Survey	·	3.1 km	MPC · JPL
706362	2009 XL_{27}	—	June 18, 2013	Haleakala	Pan-STARRS 1	·	2.6 km	MPC · JPL
706363	2009 XM_{27}	—	February 9, 2017	Haleakala	Pan-STARRS 1	·	3.2 km	MPC · JPL
706364	2009 XN_{27}	—	December 10, 2009	Mount Lemmon	Mount Lemmon Survey	VER	2.4 km	MPC · JPL
706365	2009 XX_{27}	—	October 19, 2014	Kitt Peak	Spacewatch	·	2.2 km	MPC · JPL
706366	2009 XZ_{27}	—	December 11, 2009	Mount Lemmon	Mount Lemmon Survey	·	1.9 km	MPC · JPL
706367	2009 XL_{28}	—	December 10, 2009	Mount Lemmon	Mount Lemmon Survey	·	2.2 km	MPC · JPL
706368	2009 XM_{28}	—	January 2, 2016	Haleakala	Pan-STARRS 1	·	3.0 km	MPC · JPL
706369	2009 XO_{28}	—	March 21, 2015	Haleakala	Pan-STARRS 1	·	790 m	MPC · JPL
706370	2009 XR_{28}	—	December 10, 2009	Mount Lemmon	Mount Lemmon Survey	·	2.5 km	MPC · JPL
706371	2009 XM_{29}	—	December 11, 2009	Mount Lemmon	Mount Lemmon Survey	·	2.1 km	MPC · JPL
706372	2009 XH_{30}	—	December 11, 2009	Mount Lemmon	Mount Lemmon Survey	EOS	1.7 km	MPC · JPL
706373	2009 YY_{1}	—	December 17, 2009	Mount Lemmon	Mount Lemmon Survey	·	3.0 km	MPC · JPL
706374	2009 YB_{8}	—	December 16, 2009	Mount Lemmon	Mount Lemmon Survey	·	2.3 km	MPC · JPL
706375	2009 YP_{9}	—	December 17, 2009	Mount Lemmon	Mount Lemmon Survey	·	1.7 km	MPC · JPL
706376	2009 YU_{9}	—	February 12, 2000	Apache Point	SDSS Collaboration	·	2.6 km	MPC · JPL
706377	2009 YC_{14}	—	September 30, 2003	Kitt Peak	Spacewatch	·	2.5 km	MPC · JPL
706378	2009 YH_{14}	—	September 7, 2008	Mount Lemmon	Mount Lemmon Survey	·	1.4 km	MPC · JPL
706379	2009 YB_{17}	—	October 27, 2005	Mount Lemmon	Mount Lemmon Survey	·	1.0 km	MPC · JPL
706380	2009 YC_{26}	—	December 18, 2009	Kitt Peak	Spacewatch	·	940 m	MPC · JPL
706381	2009 YQ_{26}	—	December 18, 2009	Kitt Peak	Spacewatch	MAR	880 m	MPC · JPL
706382	2009 YH_{27}	—	December 18, 2009	Kitt Peak	Spacewatch	VER	2.4 km	MPC · JPL
706383	2009 YT_{27}	—	September 13, 2017	Haleakala	Pan-STARRS 1	HNS	920 m	MPC · JPL
706384	2009 YM_{30}	—	May 21, 2012	Mount Lemmon	Mount Lemmon Survey	·	3.3 km	MPC · JPL
706385	2009 YQ_{30}	—	April 23, 2015	Haleakala	Pan-STARRS 1	·	960 m	MPC · JPL
706386	2009 YG_{31}	—	December 16, 2009	Mount Lemmon	Mount Lemmon Survey	·	1.7 km	MPC · JPL
706387	2009 YJ_{31}	—	April 22, 2012	Kitt Peak	Spacewatch	EOS	1.4 km	MPC · JPL
706388	2010 AC_{4}	—	January 6, 2010	Tzec Maun	A. Novichonok	·	1.2 km	MPC · JPL
706389	2010 AO_{4}	—	January 4, 2010	Kitt Peak	Spacewatch	·	750 m	MPC · JPL
706390	2010 AP_{11}	—	January 6, 2010	Mount Lemmon	Mount Lemmon Survey	·	1.2 km	MPC · JPL
706391	2010 AB_{15}	—	July 30, 2008	Kitt Peak	Spacewatch	·	1.4 km	MPC · JPL
706392	2010 AM_{16}	—	January 7, 2010	Mount Lemmon	Mount Lemmon Survey	·	810 m	MPC · JPL
706393	2010 AW_{17}	—	December 18, 2009	Mount Lemmon	Mount Lemmon Survey	·	3.0 km	MPC · JPL
706394	2010 AW_{24}	—	January 6, 2010	Kitt Peak	Spacewatch	(1547)	1.3 km	MPC · JPL
706395	2010 AW_{28}	—	January 8, 2010	Mount Lemmon	Mount Lemmon Survey	·	1.9 km	MPC · JPL
706396	2010 AQ_{29}	—	January 8, 2010	Kitt Peak	Spacewatch	NYS	1.1 km	MPC · JPL
706397	2010 AD_{31}	—	January 6, 2010	Mount Lemmon	Mount Lemmon Survey	·	1.4 km	MPC · JPL
706398	2010 AX_{34}	—	January 7, 2010	Kitt Peak	Spacewatch	·	3.2 km	MPC · JPL
706399	2010 AP_{37}	—	January 7, 2010	Kitt Peak	Spacewatch	(5)	930 m	MPC · JPL
706400	2010 AH_{42}	—	January 6, 2010	Mount Lemmon	Mount Lemmon Survey	·	1.2 km	MPC · JPL

== 706401–706500 ==
back to top

Designation			Discovery			Properties		Ref
Permanent	Provisional	Named after	Date	Site	Discoverer(s)	Category	Diam.	Ref
706401	2010 AD_{47}	—	January 8, 2010	Kitt Peak	Spacewatch	·	2.6 km	MPC · JPL
706402	2010 AV_{47}	—	January 8, 2010	Kitt Peak	Spacewatch	·	2.9 km	MPC · JPL
706403	2010 AC_{58}	—	January 11, 2010	Kitt Peak	Spacewatch	·	940 m	MPC · JPL
706404	2010 AO_{58}	—	January 11, 2010	Kitt Peak	Spacewatch	·	1.1 km	MPC · JPL
706405	2010 AS_{61}	—	January 9, 2010	Mount Lemmon	Mount Lemmon Survey	H	390 m	MPC · JPL
706406	2010 AX_{61}	—	January 7, 2010	Kitt Peak	Spacewatch	(5)	1.2 km	MPC · JPL
706407	2010 AB_{70}	—	January 12, 2010	Mount Lemmon	Mount Lemmon Survey	·	2.4 km	MPC · JPL
706408	2010 AS_{76}	—	December 19, 2009	Kitt Peak	Spacewatch	·	1.6 km	MPC · JPL
706409	2010 AO_{142}	—	January 6, 2006	Mount Lemmon	Mount Lemmon Survey	·	1.5 km	MPC · JPL
706410	2010 AR_{142}	—	December 19, 2009	Mount Lemmon	Mount Lemmon Survey	·	1.1 km	MPC · JPL
706411	2010 AZ_{143}	—	December 20, 2009	Kitt Peak	Spacewatch	·	1.4 km	MPC · JPL
706412	2010 AJ_{147}	—	September 29, 2009	Mount Lemmon	Mount Lemmon Survey	·	2.1 km	MPC · JPL
706413	2010 AY_{152}	—	September 2, 2014	Haleakala	Pan-STARRS 1	·	1.6 km	MPC · JPL
706414	2010 AY_{153}	—	January 15, 2010	Kitt Peak	Spacewatch	·	1.6 km	MPC · JPL
706415	2010 AL_{154}	—	February 27, 2015	Haleakala	Pan-STARRS 1	·	1.3 km	MPC · JPL
706416	2010 AT_{154}	—	July 28, 2011	Haleakala	Pan-STARRS 1	·	1.5 km	MPC · JPL
706417	2010 AC_{155}	—	August 15, 2013	Haleakala	Pan-STARRS 1	·	2.4 km	MPC · JPL
706418	2010 AB_{156}	—	July 12, 2016	Haleakala	Pan-STARRS 1	·	1.3 km	MPC · JPL
706419	2010 AP_{157}	—	February 11, 2016	Haleakala	Pan-STARRS 1	·	2.8 km	MPC · JPL
706420	2010 AR_{157}	—	December 20, 2009	Kitt Peak	Spacewatch	·	1.7 km	MPC · JPL
706421	2010 AT_{157}	—	March 29, 2015	Haleakala	Pan-STARRS 1	·	1.8 km	MPC · JPL
706422	2010 AW_{157}	—	December 25, 2017	Mount Lemmon	Mount Lemmon Survey	H	440 m	MPC · JPL
706423	2010 AN_{158}	—	December 14, 2015	Haleakala	Pan-STARRS 1	·	2.1 km	MPC · JPL
706424	2010 AP_{158}	—	January 8, 2016	Haleakala	Pan-STARRS 1	·	2.2 km	MPC · JPL
706425	2010 AZ_{158}	—	February 6, 2016	Haleakala	Pan-STARRS 1	·	2.4 km	MPC · JPL
706426	2010 AW_{160}	—	January 28, 2011	Mount Lemmon	Mount Lemmon Survey	EOS	1.7 km	MPC · JPL
706427	2010 AH_{162}	—	August 22, 2004	Kitt Peak	Spacewatch	·	780 m	MPC · JPL
706428	2010 AB_{163}	—	January 6, 2010	Kitt Peak	Spacewatch	·	3.4 km	MPC · JPL
706429	2010 AS_{163}	—	October 7, 2004	Kitt Peak	Spacewatch	(5)	1.2 km	MPC · JPL
706430	2010 BV	—	December 29, 2005	Kitt Peak	Spacewatch	·	1.3 km	MPC · JPL
706431	2010 BT_{133}	—	January 14, 2011	Kitt Peak	Spacewatch	EOS	1.3 km	MPC · JPL
706432	2010 BJ_{149}	—	April 7, 2010	Kitt Peak	Spacewatch	·	1.5 km	MPC · JPL
706433	2010 CU_{2}	—	February 5, 2010	Kitt Peak	Spacewatch	MAS	580 m	MPC · JPL
706434	2010 CJ_{22}	—	March 9, 2002	Anderson Mesa	LONEOS	·	1.1 km	MPC · JPL
706435	2010 CN_{31}	—	December 28, 2005	Kitt Peak	Spacewatch	·	960 m	MPC · JPL
706436	2010 CQ_{32}	—	April 11, 1999	Kitt Peak	Spacewatch	·	860 m	MPC · JPL
706437	2010 CY_{36}	—	February 9, 2010	Mount Lemmon	Mount Lemmon Survey	·	2.5 km	MPC · JPL
706438	2010 CC_{38}	—	February 13, 2010	Mount Lemmon	Mount Lemmon Survey	·	1.2 km	MPC · JPL
706439	2010 CV_{39}	—	February 13, 2010	Mount Lemmon	Mount Lemmon Survey	·	540 m	MPC · JPL
706440	2010 CB_{61}	—	January 22, 2006	Mount Lemmon	Mount Lemmon Survey	·	1.3 km	MPC · JPL
706441	2010 CJ_{63}	—	February 9, 2010	Kitt Peak	Spacewatch	·	1.9 km	MPC · JPL
706442	2010 CD_{65}	—	January 23, 2006	Catalina	CSS	·	1.5 km	MPC · JPL
706443	2010 CW_{69}	—	October 11, 2005	Kitt Peak	Spacewatch	·	640 m	MPC · JPL
706444	2010 CJ_{72}	—	October 1, 2005	Mount Lemmon	Mount Lemmon Survey	·	510 m	MPC · JPL
706445	2010 CZ_{86}	—	February 14, 2010	Mount Lemmon	Mount Lemmon Survey	·	2.8 km	MPC · JPL
706446	2010 CD_{87}	—	January 6, 2010	Kitt Peak	Spacewatch	EUN	990 m	MPC · JPL
706447	2010 CZ_{87}	—	February 14, 2010	Mount Lemmon	Mount Lemmon Survey	URS	2.3 km	MPC · JPL
706448	2010 CQ_{89}	—	February 14, 2010	Mount Lemmon	Mount Lemmon Survey	·	2.6 km	MPC · JPL
706449	2010 CK_{95}	—	August 23, 2003	Palomar	NEAT	MAR	1.1 km	MPC · JPL
706450	2010 CW_{97}	—	January 11, 2010	Kitt Peak	Spacewatch	·	940 m	MPC · JPL
706451	2010 CS_{101}	—	February 14, 2010	Mount Lemmon	Mount Lemmon Survey	·	490 m	MPC · JPL
706452	2010 CW_{105}	—	February 14, 2010	Mount Lemmon	Mount Lemmon Survey	·	1.2 km	MPC · JPL
706453	2010 CS_{117}	—	February 2, 2006	Kitt Peak	Spacewatch	·	1.0 km	MPC · JPL
706454	2010 CU_{118}	—	January 11, 2010	Kitt Peak	Spacewatch	·	550 m	MPC · JPL
706455	2010 CY_{124}	—	October 9, 2008	Mount Lemmon	Mount Lemmon Survey	·	1.5 km	MPC · JPL
706456	2010 CM_{126}	—	February 15, 2010	Mount Lemmon	Mount Lemmon Survey	·	1.5 km	MPC · JPL
706457	2010 CJ_{138}	—	February 14, 2010	Mount Lemmon	Mount Lemmon Survey	·	420 m	MPC · JPL
706458	2010 CF_{149}	—	February 14, 2010	Mount Lemmon	Mount Lemmon Survey	·	610 m	MPC · JPL
706459	2010 CH_{151}	—	February 14, 2010	Kitt Peak	Spacewatch	·	1.0 km	MPC · JPL
706460	2010 CW_{161}	—	August 23, 2007	Kitt Peak	Spacewatch	·	1.8 km	MPC · JPL
706461	2010 CT_{162}	—	November 27, 2009	Mount Lemmon	Mount Lemmon Survey	MAR	880 m	MPC · JPL
706462	2010 CX_{163}	—	December 25, 2005	Kitt Peak	Spacewatch	·	990 m	MPC · JPL
706463	2010 CY_{164}	—	December 26, 2005	Kitt Peak	Spacewatch	NYS	950 m	MPC · JPL
706464	2010 CD_{168}	—	February 15, 2010	Mount Lemmon	Mount Lemmon Survey	AST	1.3 km	MPC · JPL
706465	2010 CX_{168}	—	August 24, 2003	Cerro Tololo	Deep Ecliptic Survey	·	920 m	MPC · JPL
706466	2010 CZ_{176}	—	February 10, 2010	Kitt Peak	Spacewatch	·	2.4 km	MPC · JPL
706467	2010 CK_{177}	—	February 10, 2010	Kitt Peak	Spacewatch	·	970 m	MPC · JPL
706468	2010 CZ_{247}	—	January 11, 2010	Kitt Peak	Spacewatch	·	1.1 km	MPC · JPL
706469	2010 CT_{249}	—	February 14, 2010	Mount Lemmon	Mount Lemmon Survey	·	1.2 km	MPC · JPL
706470	2010 CE_{251}	—	December 28, 2013	Kitt Peak	Spacewatch	·	990 m	MPC · JPL
706471	2010 CY_{251}	—	April 5, 2019	Haleakala	Pan-STARRS 1	·	1.3 km	MPC · JPL
706472	2010 CG_{265}	—	March 29, 2012	Haleakala	Pan-STARRS 1	T_{j} (2.99) · 3:2	4.6 km	MPC · JPL
706473	2010 CL_{273}	—	February 9, 2014	Kitt Peak	Spacewatch	PHO	690 m	MPC · JPL
706474	2010 CW_{277}	—	March 6, 2016	Haleakala	Pan-STARRS 1	T_{j} (2.98)	2.7 km	MPC · JPL
706475	2010 DW_{3}	—	January 7, 2010	Kitt Peak	Spacewatch	MAS	520 m	MPC · JPL
706476	2010 DZ_{3}	—	February 16, 2010	Mount Lemmon	Mount Lemmon Survey	HOF	2.1 km	MPC · JPL
706477	2010 DM_{9}	—	February 16, 2010	Kitt Peak	Spacewatch	·	1.1 km	MPC · JPL
706478	2010 DZ_{39}	—	February 16, 2010	Catalina	CSS	·	1.1 km	MPC · JPL
706479	2010 DA_{40}	—	February 16, 2010	Mount Lemmon	Mount Lemmon Survey	·	1.1 km	MPC · JPL
706480	2010 DL_{47}	—	February 17, 2010	Mount Lemmon	Mount Lemmon Survey	·	1.0 km	MPC · JPL
706481	2010 DW_{47}	—	September 23, 2008	Kitt Peak	Spacewatch	·	490 m	MPC · JPL
706482	2010 DW_{48}	—	September 27, 2008	Mount Lemmon	Mount Lemmon Survey	AEO	1.3 km	MPC · JPL
706483	2010 DT_{49}	—	February 16, 2010	Kitt Peak	Spacewatch	·	550 m	MPC · JPL
706484	2010 DO_{75}	—	January 7, 2010	Kitt Peak	Spacewatch	·	1.3 km	MPC · JPL
706485	2010 DK_{103}	—	July 12, 2013	Haleakala	Pan-STARRS 1	·	3.2 km	MPC · JPL
706486	2010 DA_{107}	—	January 21, 2014	Mount Lemmon	Mount Lemmon Survey	·	1.1 km	MPC · JPL
706487	2010 DP_{108}	—	October 3, 2013	Catalina	CSS	·	3.1 km	MPC · JPL
706488	2010 DJ_{110}	—	July 11, 2016	Haleakala	Pan-STARRS 1	HNS	950 m	MPC · JPL
706489	2010 DO_{111}	—	February 5, 2016	Haleakala	Pan-STARRS 1	·	2.4 km	MPC · JPL
706490	2010 DX_{113}	—	February 16, 2010	Kitt Peak	Spacewatch	V	420 m	MPC · JPL
706491	2010 DB_{115}	—	February 16, 2010	Mount Lemmon	Mount Lemmon Survey	·	1.2 km	MPC · JPL
706492	2010 EN_{2}	—	October 7, 2005	Mauna Kea	A. Boattini	·	990 m	MPC · JPL
706493	2010 EC_{22}	—	March 9, 2010	Taunus	Karge, S., R. Kling	·	1.0 km	MPC · JPL
706494	2010 EC_{37}	—	September 4, 2008	Kitt Peak	Spacewatch	·	710 m	MPC · JPL
706495	2010 ET_{66}	—	February 15, 2010	Kitt Peak	Spacewatch	·	1.3 km	MPC · JPL
706496	2010 EG_{67}	—	February 14, 2010	Kitt Peak	Spacewatch	·	2.6 km	MPC · JPL
706497	2010 ER_{67}	—	March 13, 2010	Mount Lemmon	Mount Lemmon Survey	(1547)	1.4 km	MPC · JPL
706498	2010 ER_{71}	—	October 19, 2003	Apache Point	SDSS Collaboration	·	1.4 km	MPC · JPL
706499	2010 EJ_{84}	—	October 8, 2007	Mount Lemmon	Mount Lemmon Survey	·	1.3 km	MPC · JPL
706500	2010 EN_{88}	—	January 15, 2010	Mount Lemmon	Mount Lemmon Survey	·	1.5 km	MPC · JPL

== 706501–706600 ==
back to top

Designation			Discovery			Properties		Ref
Permanent	Provisional	Named after	Date	Site	Discoverer(s)	Category	Diam.	Ref
706501	2010 EF_{91}	—	February 17, 2010	Kitt Peak	Spacewatch	·	490 m	MPC · JPL
706502	2010 EF_{92}	—	August 26, 2003	Cerro Tololo	Deep Ecliptic Survey	·	1.1 km	MPC · JPL
706503	2010 EP_{97}	—	March 14, 2010	Mount Lemmon	Mount Lemmon Survey	MIS	2.0 km	MPC · JPL
706504	2010 EZ_{97}	—	April 21, 2006	Kitt Peak	Spacewatch	·	1.4 km	MPC · JPL
706505	2010 ED_{98}	—	March 14, 2010	Mount Lemmon	Mount Lemmon Survey	·	990 m	MPC · JPL
706506	2010 EK_{99}	—	March 14, 2010	Kitt Peak	Spacewatch	·	1.8 km	MPC · JPL
706507	2010 EZ_{101}	—	September 9, 2008	Mount Lemmon	Mount Lemmon Survey	·	940 m	MPC · JPL
706508	2010 EM_{107}	—	March 12, 2010	Kitt Peak	Spacewatch	·	1.8 km	MPC · JPL
706509	2010 ER_{107}	—	March 12, 2010	Mount Lemmon	Mount Lemmon Survey	(5)	1.0 km	MPC · JPL
706510	2010 EJ_{122}	—	March 15, 2010	Mount Lemmon	Mount Lemmon Survey	·	2.5 km	MPC · JPL
706511	2010 EX_{131}	—	March 15, 2010	Kitt Peak	Spacewatch	·	1.1 km	MPC · JPL
706512	2010 EN_{177}	—	November 10, 2013	Kitt Peak	Spacewatch	·	1.2 km	MPC · JPL
706513	2010 EG_{182}	—	April 9, 2014	Haleakala	Pan-STARRS 1	·	1.9 km	MPC · JPL
706514	2010 EH_{187}	—	December 7, 2005	Kitt Peak	Spacewatch	·	1.1 km	MPC · JPL
706515	2010 EZ_{188}	—	March 15, 2010	Kitt Peak	Spacewatch	·	600 m	MPC · JPL
706516	2010 EC_{189}	—	March 13, 2010	Mount Lemmon	Mount Lemmon Survey	·	790 m	MPC · JPL
706517	2010 EH_{189}	—	January 19, 2015	Mount Lemmon	Mount Lemmon Survey	·	2.9 km	MPC · JPL
706518	2010 FE	—	March 16, 2010	Catalina	CSS	H	500 m	MPC · JPL
706519	2010 FX_{15}	—	March 12, 2010	Kitt Peak	Spacewatch	·	1.7 km	MPC · JPL
706520	2010 FJ_{21}	—	March 18, 2010	Mount Lemmon	Mount Lemmon Survey	·	1.2 km	MPC · JPL
706521	2010 FH_{23}	—	February 16, 2010	Mount Lemmon	Mount Lemmon Survey	·	1.4 km	MPC · JPL
706522	2010 FU_{27}	—	April 12, 2000	Kitt Peak	Spacewatch	·	560 m	MPC · JPL
706523	2010 FX_{30}	—	August 10, 2007	Kitt Peak	Spacewatch	·	1.4 km	MPC · JPL
706524	2010 FS_{55}	—	September 29, 2008	Mount Lemmon	Mount Lemmon Survey	MAR	1.0 km	MPC · JPL
706525	2010 FB_{57}	—	March 16, 2010	Mount Lemmon	Mount Lemmon Survey	JUN	980 m	MPC · JPL
706526	2010 FA_{89}	—	May 12, 2006	Mount Lemmon	Mount Lemmon Survey	·	1.2 km	MPC · JPL
706527	2010 FP_{92}	—	March 19, 2010	Kitt Peak	Spacewatch	·	1.6 km	MPC · JPL
706528	2010 FU_{93}	—	November 1, 2008	Mount Lemmon	Mount Lemmon Survey	·	1.2 km	MPC · JPL
706529	2010 FT_{95}	—	March 16, 2010	Kitt Peak	Spacewatch	·	630 m	MPC · JPL
706530	2010 FF_{136}	—	March 30, 2010	WISE	WISE	·	1.8 km	MPC · JPL
706531	2010 FK_{142}	—	August 2, 2016	Haleakala	Pan-STARRS 1	NEM	1.5 km	MPC · JPL
706532	2010 FM_{142}	—	February 6, 2016	Haleakala	Pan-STARRS 1	·	2.8 km	MPC · JPL
706533	2010 FU_{143}	—	March 16, 2010	Mount Lemmon	Mount Lemmon Survey	·	570 m	MPC · JPL
706534	2010 GT_{34}	—	February 17, 2010	Kitt Peak	Spacewatch	·	1.1 km	MPC · JPL
706535	2010 GX_{34}	—	April 9, 2010	La Silla	D. L. Rabinowitz, S. Tourtellotte	centaur	119 km	MPC · JPL
706536	2010 GP_{35}	—	December 22, 2008	Mount Lemmon	Mount Lemmon Survey	·	1.2 km	MPC · JPL
706537	2010 GY_{97}	—	April 10, 2010	Kitt Peak	Spacewatch	·	1.8 km	MPC · JPL
706538	2010 GS_{100}	—	November 1, 2000	Socorro	LINEAR	·	1.2 km	MPC · JPL
706539	2010 GP_{113}	—	April 10, 2010	Kitt Peak	Spacewatch	·	1.6 km	MPC · JPL
706540	2010 GS_{113}	—	April 10, 2010	Kitt Peak	Spacewatch	·	610 m	MPC · JPL
706541	2010 GK_{114}	—	April 10, 2010	Kitt Peak	Spacewatch	·	670 m	MPC · JPL
706542	2010 GQ_{119}	—	April 2, 2005	Mount Lemmon	Mount Lemmon Survey	·	1.4 km	MPC · JPL
706543	2010 GE_{132}	—	September 19, 1998	Apache Point	SDSS Collaboration	·	1.3 km	MPC · JPL
706544	2010 GB_{133}	—	April 11, 2010	Kitt Peak	Spacewatch	·	3.2 km	MPC · JPL
706545	2010 GO_{136}	—	April 5, 2010	Kitt Peak	Spacewatch	·	1.4 km	MPC · JPL
706546	2010 GY_{140}	—	April 8, 2010	Kitt Peak	Spacewatch	·	1.2 km	MPC · JPL
706547	2010 GG_{144}	—	September 18, 2003	Kitt Peak	Spacewatch	·	1.1 km	MPC · JPL
706548	2010 GH_{175}	—	April 8, 2006	Kitt Peak	Spacewatch	·	1.3 km	MPC · JPL
706549	2010 GZ_{176}	—	April 11, 2010	Mount Lemmon	Mount Lemmon Survey	·	650 m	MPC · JPL
706550	2010 GF_{181}	—	November 17, 2014	Haleakala	Pan-STARRS 1	·	2.4 km	MPC · JPL
706551	2010 GG_{186}	—	August 31, 2017	Haleakala	Pan-STARRS 1	·	2.3 km	MPC · JPL
706552	2010 GY_{191}	—	April 9, 2013	XuYi	PMO NEO Survey Program	PHO	740 m	MPC · JPL
706553	2010 GZ_{193}	—	July 22, 2017	ESA OGS	ESA OGS	·	550 m	MPC · JPL
706554	2010 GP_{197}	—	August 26, 2016	Haleakala	Pan-STARRS 1	·	2.4 km	MPC · JPL
706555	2010 GF_{200}	—	April 10, 2010	Mount Lemmon	Mount Lemmon Survey	·	1.2 km	MPC · JPL
706556	2010 GK_{202}	—	August 2, 2016	Haleakala	Pan-STARRS 1	·	1.5 km	MPC · JPL
706557	2010 GS_{202}	—	March 31, 2014	Mount Lemmon	Mount Lemmon Survey	·	830 m	MPC · JPL
706558	2010 GV_{202}	—	April 9, 2010	Mount Lemmon	Mount Lemmon Survey	·	1.8 km	MPC · JPL
706559	2010 GM_{203}	—	April 10, 2010	Kitt Peak	Spacewatch	·	1.6 km	MPC · JPL
706560	2010 GO_{206}	—	April 8, 2010	Kitt Peak	Spacewatch	·	580 m	MPC · JPL
706561	2010 GT_{207}	—	April 9, 2010	Mount Lemmon	Mount Lemmon Survey	·	1.3 km	MPC · JPL
706562	2010 GB_{208}	—	April 12, 2010	Mount Lemmon	Mount Lemmon Survey	·	1.2 km	MPC · JPL
706563	2010 HR_{3}	—	April 16, 2010	WISE	WISE	·	2.3 km	MPC · JPL
706564	2010 HT_{6}	—	December 20, 2009	Mount Lemmon	Mount Lemmon Survey	·	2.4 km	MPC · JPL
706565	2010 HY_{77}	—	January 10, 2006	Kitt Peak	Spacewatch	NYS	760 m	MPC · JPL
706566	2010 HV_{106}	—	December 29, 2008	Kitt Peak	Spacewatch	·	1.2 km	MPC · JPL
706567	2010 HE_{112}	—	April 7, 2010	Mount Lemmon	Mount Lemmon Survey	·	2.8 km	MPC · JPL
706568	2010 HV_{112}	—	April 20, 2010	WISE	WISE	L5	10 km	MPC · JPL
706569	2010 HB_{116}	—	August 14, 2016	Haleakala	Pan-STARRS 1	·	2.1 km	MPC · JPL
706570	2010 HW_{136}	—	October 1, 2008	Mount Lemmon	Mount Lemmon Survey	·	1.2 km	MPC · JPL
706571	2010 HE_{139}	—	November 20, 2017	Haleakala	Pan-STARRS 1	·	1.7 km	MPC · JPL
706572	2010 JW_{29}	—	May 3, 2010	Kitt Peak	Spacewatch	WIT	920 m	MPC · JPL
706573	2010 JX_{35}	—	April 15, 2010	Mount Lemmon	Mount Lemmon Survey	H	370 m	MPC · JPL
706574	2010 JS_{38}	—	April 19, 2006	Mount Lemmon	Mount Lemmon Survey	·	940 m	MPC · JPL
706575	2010 JR_{40}	—	April 20, 2010	Kitt Peak	Spacewatch	·	710 m	MPC · JPL
706576	2010 JX_{45}	—	May 7, 2010	Kitt Peak	Spacewatch	·	1.2 km	MPC · JPL
706577	2010 JA_{79}	—	May 11, 2010	Mount Lemmon	Mount Lemmon Survey	·	1.1 km	MPC · JPL
706578	2010 JG_{85}	—	May 10, 2010	Mount Lemmon	Mount Lemmon Survey	·	600 m	MPC · JPL
706579	2010 JV_{111}	—	May 12, 2010	Kitt Peak	Spacewatch	·	600 m	MPC · JPL
706580	2010 JL_{117}	—	May 5, 2010	Mount Lemmon	Mount Lemmon Survey	·	1.4 km	MPC · JPL
706581	2010 JC_{118}	—	May 8, 2010	Mount Lemmon	Mount Lemmon Survey	·	1.4 km	MPC · JPL
706582	2010 JJ_{121}	—	May 12, 2010	Mount Lemmon	Mount Lemmon Survey	·	1.1 km	MPC · JPL
706583	2010 JO_{149}	—	May 6, 2010	Mount Lemmon	Mount Lemmon Survey	·	610 m	MPC · JPL
706584	2010 JB_{154}	—	May 5, 2010	Mount Lemmon	Mount Lemmon Survey	·	1.3 km	MPC · JPL
706585	2010 JK_{154}	—	January 23, 2006	Kitt Peak	Spacewatch	·	620 m	MPC · JPL
706586	2010 JM_{154}	—	April 9, 2010	Kitt Peak	Spacewatch	(5)	1.2 km	MPC · JPL
706587	2010 JG_{156}	—	November 9, 2007	Kitt Peak	Spacewatch	EOS	1.4 km	MPC · JPL
706588	2010 JH_{159}	—	March 16, 2010	Kitt Peak	Spacewatch	MIS	2.3 km	MPC · JPL
706589	2010 JB_{160}	—	May 5, 2010	Mount Lemmon	Mount Lemmon Survey	AGN	950 m	MPC · JPL
706590	2010 JU_{161}	—	May 7, 2010	Kitt Peak	Spacewatch	·	1.4 km	MPC · JPL
706591	2010 JX_{161}	—	December 28, 2000	Haleakala	NEAT	·	1.4 km	MPC · JPL
706592	2010 JC_{162}	—	January 9, 2014	Haleakala	Pan-STARRS 1	·	1.6 km	MPC · JPL
706593	2010 JY_{170}	—	April 20, 2010	Mount Lemmon	Mount Lemmon Survey	·	2.0 km	MPC · JPL
706594	2010 JU_{171}	—	May 6, 2010	Kitt Peak	Spacewatch	·	570 m	MPC · JPL
706595	2010 JY_{173}	—	May 9, 2010	Mount Lemmon	Mount Lemmon Survey	·	1.8 km	MPC · JPL
706596	2010 JM_{174}	—	April 9, 2010	Kitt Peak	Spacewatch	·	1.1 km	MPC · JPL
706597	2010 JQ_{174}	—	May 11, 2010	Mount Lemmon	Mount Lemmon Survey	·	550 m	MPC · JPL
706598	2010 JK_{183}	—	November 2, 2008	Mount Lemmon	Mount Lemmon Survey	·	1.2 km	MPC · JPL
706599	2010 JF_{187}	—	April 25, 2015	Haleakala	Pan-STARRS 1	·	1.1 km	MPC · JPL
706600	2010 JS_{190}	—	February 1, 2009	Catalina	CSS	·	2.0 km	MPC · JPL

== 706601–706700 ==
back to top

Designation			Discovery			Properties		Ref
Permanent	Provisional	Named after	Date	Site	Discoverer(s)	Category	Diam.	Ref
706601	2010 JC_{193}	—	November 1, 1999	Kitt Peak	Spacewatch	·	1.5 km	MPC · JPL
706602	2010 JX_{199}	—	October 17, 2012	Haleakala	Pan-STARRS 1	ADE	1.4 km	MPC · JPL
706603	2010 JV_{200}	—	October 8, 2016	Haleakala	Pan-STARRS 1	·	1.9 km	MPC · JPL
706604	2010 JJ_{206}	—	October 21, 2017	Mount Lemmon	Mount Lemmon Survey	·	3.5 km	MPC · JPL
706605	2010 JW_{209}	—	January 29, 2014	Catalina	CSS	·	1.3 km	MPC · JPL
706606	2010 JV_{210}	—	October 20, 2012	Mount Lemmon	Mount Lemmon Survey	EOS	1.8 km	MPC · JPL
706607	2010 JK_{211}	—	May 11, 2010	Mount Lemmon	Mount Lemmon Survey	·	1.7 km	MPC · JPL
706608	2010 JO_{211}	—	July 27, 2011	Haleakala	Pan-STARRS 1	·	3.1 km	MPC · JPL
706609	2010 JH_{212}	—	October 15, 2012	Haleakala	Pan-STARRS 1	·	1.6 km	MPC · JPL
706610	2010 JL_{212}	—	June 26, 2015	Haleakala	Pan-STARRS 1	·	1.3 km	MPC · JPL
706611	2010 JM_{212}	—	October 10, 2012	Mount Lemmon	Mount Lemmon Survey	·	1.9 km	MPC · JPL
706612	2010 JS_{212}	—	September 24, 2011	Haleakala	Pan-STARRS 1	·	1.6 km	MPC · JPL
706613	2010 JV_{212}	—	February 24, 2014	Haleakala	Pan-STARRS 1	·	1.3 km	MPC · JPL
706614	2010 JG_{213}	—	May 25, 2015	Haleakala	Pan-STARRS 1	·	1.5 km	MPC · JPL
706615	2010 JJ_{213}	—	February 21, 2014	Haleakala	Pan-STARRS 1	·	1.5 km	MPC · JPL
706616	2010 KX_{9}	—	May 17, 2010	Kitt Peak	Spacewatch	·	1.2 km	MPC · JPL
706617	2010 KS_{146}	—	May 24, 2010	WISE	WISE	·	1.1 km	MPC · JPL
706618	2010 KM_{157}	—	October 18, 2012	Haleakala	Pan-STARRS 1	·	1.6 km	MPC · JPL
706619	2010 KG_{158}	—	January 3, 2016	Haleakala	Pan-STARRS 1	3:2 · SHU	3.9 km	MPC · JPL
706620	2010 LO_{35}	—	September 10, 2007	Mount Lemmon	Mount Lemmon Survey	·	650 m	MPC · JPL
706621	2010 LB_{63}	—	June 10, 2010	Mount Lemmon	Mount Lemmon Survey	·	1.2 km	MPC · JPL
706622	2010 LZ_{64}	—	June 11, 2010	Catalina	CSS	·	1.4 km	MPC · JPL
706623	2010 LH_{104}	—	May 7, 2010	Mount Lemmon	Mount Lemmon Survey	·	1.6 km	MPC · JPL
706624	2010 LU_{104}	—	June 3, 2010	Kitt Peak	Spacewatch	·	1.4 km	MPC · JPL
706625	2010 LY_{104}	—	June 6, 2010	Nogales	M. Schwartz, P. R. Holvorcem	·	1.7 km	MPC · JPL
706626	2010 LA_{112}	—	October 11, 2007	Kitt Peak	Spacewatch	·	1.8 km	MPC · JPL
706627	2010 LG_{113}	—	February 4, 2009	Mount Lemmon	Mount Lemmon Survey	·	1.4 km	MPC · JPL
706628	2010 LL_{138}	—	October 30, 2008	Kitt Peak	Spacewatch	HOF	1.9 km	MPC · JPL
706629	2010 LM_{148}	—	October 21, 2007	Mount Lemmon	Mount Lemmon Survey	·	2.9 km	MPC · JPL
706630	2010 LV_{152}	—	November 25, 2013	Haleakala	Pan-STARRS 1	·	3.1 km	MPC · JPL
706631	2010 LA_{158}	—	September 25, 2016	Haleakala	Pan-STARRS 1	URS	2.5 km	MPC · JPL
706632	2010 LW_{158}	—	May 13, 2010	Mount Lemmon	Mount Lemmon Survey	·	1.4 km	MPC · JPL
706633	2010 MM_{114}	—	June 21, 2010	Mount Lemmon	Mount Lemmon Survey	·	1.4 km	MPC · JPL
706634	2010 MQ_{114}	—	June 22, 2010	Mount Lemmon	Mount Lemmon Survey	·	1.9 km	MPC · JPL
706635	2010 MR_{114}	—	June 22, 2010	Mount Lemmon	Mount Lemmon Survey	·	640 m	MPC · JPL
706636	2010 MY_{143}	—	July 14, 2016	Haleakala	Pan-STARRS 1	·	1.4 km	MPC · JPL
706637	2010 MX_{146}	—	June 21, 2010	Mount Lemmon	Mount Lemmon Survey	·	3.2 km	MPC · JPL
706638	2010 MD_{147}	—	January 14, 2012	Kitt Peak	Spacewatch	·	630 m	MPC · JPL
706639	2010 MV_{147}	—	May 18, 2015	Haleakala	Pan-STARRS 1	·	2.0 km	MPC · JPL
706640	2010 MD_{148}	—	May 25, 2014	Haleakala	Pan-STARRS 1	TIN	850 m	MPC · JPL
706641	2010 MM_{148}	—	March 8, 2014	Mount Lemmon	Mount Lemmon Survey	·	1.4 km	MPC · JPL
706642	2010 MD_{149}	—	January 17, 2018	Haleakala	Pan-STARRS 1	L5	7.5 km	MPC · JPL
706643	2010 MJ_{149}	—	April 29, 2014	Haleakala	Pan-STARRS 1	ADE	1.8 km	MPC · JPL
706644	2010 NN_{5}	—	July 13, 2010	La Sagra	OAM	·	1.1 km	MPC · JPL
706645	2010 NY_{6}	—	July 7, 2010	Sandlot	G. Hug	·	650 m	MPC · JPL
706646	2010 NA_{66}	—	July 5, 2010	Kitt Peak	Spacewatch	·	690 m	MPC · JPL
706647	2010 NJ_{111}	—	November 21, 2001	Apache Point	SDSS Collaboration	·	2.2 km	MPC · JPL
706648	2010 NK_{119}	—	March 20, 2010	Kitt Peak	Spacewatch	·	1.6 km	MPC · JPL
706649	2010 NV_{138}	—	July 12, 2010	WISE	WISE	·	2.3 km	MPC · JPL
706650	2010 NM_{146}	—	January 2, 2016	Haleakala	Pan-STARRS 1	L5	10 km	MPC · JPL
706651	2010 NN_{146}	—	July 4, 2010	Mount Lemmon	Mount Lemmon Survey	·	690 m	MPC · JPL
706652	2010 NL_{147}	—	October 9, 2012	Haleakala	Pan-STARRS 1	L5	6.6 km	MPC · JPL
706653	2010 NQ_{147}	—	October 26, 2014	Mount Lemmon	Mount Lemmon Survey	·	570 m	MPC · JPL
706654	2010 OB_{7}	—	April 17, 2010	Kitt Peak	Spacewatch	·	1.6 km	MPC · JPL
706655	2010 OU_{142}	—	August 27, 2006	Kitt Peak	Spacewatch	·	2.9 km	MPC · JPL
706656	2010 OJ_{145}	—	July 26, 2010	WISE	WISE	·	2.4 km	MPC · JPL
706657	2010 PU_{8}	—	April 24, 2006	Kitt Peak	Spacewatch	·	780 m	MPC · JPL
706658	2010 PW_{60}	—	March 1, 2009	Kitt Peak	Spacewatch	EUN	1.0 km	MPC · JPL
706659	2010 PR_{75}	—	August 15, 2010	Mayhill-ISON	L. Elenin	H	560 m	MPC · JPL
706660	2010 PJ_{90}	—	August 12, 2010	Kitt Peak	Spacewatch	·	1.4 km	MPC · JPL
706661	2010 PZ_{90}	—	August 13, 2010	Kitt Peak	Spacewatch	·	770 m	MPC · JPL
706662	2010 PA_{93}	—	August 13, 2010	Kitt Peak	Spacewatch	EOS	1.3 km	MPC · JPL
706663	2010 QS_{2}	—	August 7, 2010	La Sagra	OAM	·	780 m	MPC · JPL
706664	2010 RE_{6}	—	September 2, 2010	Mount Lemmon	Mount Lemmon Survey	·	1.6 km	MPC · JPL
706665	2010 RN_{8}	—	September 2, 2010	Mount Lemmon	Mount Lemmon Survey	·	770 m	MPC · JPL
706666	2010 RK_{14}	—	September 1, 2010	Mount Lemmon	Mount Lemmon Survey	·	670 m	MPC · JPL
706667	2010 RB_{15}	—	August 10, 2010	XuYi	PMO NEO Survey Program	·	630 m	MPC · JPL
706668	2010 RE_{15}	—	October 18, 2000	Kitt Peak	Spacewatch	·	590 m	MPC · JPL
706669	2010 RF_{17}	—	September 2, 2010	Socorro	LINEAR	·	700 m	MPC · JPL
706670	2010 RN_{18}	—	November 3, 2007	Mount Lemmon	Mount Lemmon Survey	·	490 m	MPC · JPL
706671	2010 RR_{20}	—	September 3, 2010	Mount Lemmon	Mount Lemmon Survey	·	1.3 km	MPC · JPL
706672	2010 RD_{22}	—	September 3, 2010	Socorro	LINEAR	GEF	1.1 km	MPC · JPL
706673	2010 RF_{27}	—	August 10, 2010	Kitt Peak	Spacewatch	EOS	1.5 km	MPC · JPL
706674	2010 RU_{28}	—	September 4, 2010	Mount Lemmon	Mount Lemmon Survey	V	460 m	MPC · JPL
706675	2010 RE_{36}	—	September 2, 2010	Mount Lemmon	Mount Lemmon Survey	·	1.5 km	MPC · JPL
706676	2010 RC_{39}	—	September 16, 2003	Kitt Peak	Spacewatch	(2076)	840 m	MPC · JPL
706677	2010 RA_{45}	—	September 3, 2010	Mount Lemmon	Mount Lemmon Survey	·	1.8 km	MPC · JPL
706678	2010 RC_{49}	—	August 29, 2005	Kitt Peak	Spacewatch	KOR	1.2 km	MPC · JPL
706679	2010 RF_{49}	—	August 12, 2010	Kitt Peak	Spacewatch	·	1.7 km	MPC · JPL
706680	2010 RG_{54}	—	August 13, 2010	Kitt Peak	Spacewatch	·	1.8 km	MPC · JPL
706681	2010 RN_{57}	—	September 5, 2010	Mount Lemmon	Mount Lemmon Survey	615	1.1 km	MPC · JPL
706682	2010 RO_{62}	—	September 5, 2010	Dauban	C. Rinner, Kugel, F.	·	700 m	MPC · JPL
706683	2010 RH_{65}	—	September 5, 2010	La Sagra	OAM	EUN	1.2 km	MPC · JPL
706684	2010 RB_{67}	—	September 24, 1992	Kitt Peak	Spacewatch	·	830 m	MPC · JPL
706685	2010 RR_{68}	—	October 22, 2006	Kitt Peak	Spacewatch	·	1.4 km	MPC · JPL
706686	2010 RX_{73}	—	September 10, 2010	Catalina	CSS	·	680 m	MPC · JPL
706687	2010 RH_{75}	—	September 8, 2010	Plana	Fratev, F.	EOS	1.5 km	MPC · JPL
706688	2010 RS_{77}	—	July 12, 2005	Mount Lemmon	Mount Lemmon Survey	·	1.9 km	MPC · JPL
706689	2010 RC_{80}	—	September 3, 2010	Mount Lemmon	Mount Lemmon Survey	·	680 m	MPC · JPL
706690	2010 RA_{86}	—	September 2, 2010	Mount Lemmon	Mount Lemmon Survey	KOR	1.4 km	MPC · JPL
706691	2010 RT_{86}	—	September 2, 2010	Mount Lemmon	Mount Lemmon Survey	·	510 m	MPC · JPL
706692	2010 RW_{92}	—	September 19, 2003	Kitt Peak	Spacewatch	V	560 m	MPC · JPL
706693	2010 RE_{93}	—	September 11, 2010	Catalina	CSS	·	650 m	MPC · JPL
706694	2010 RA_{94}	—	September 12, 2010	Mount Lemmon	Mount Lemmon Survey	·	600 m	MPC · JPL
706695	2010 RN_{100}	—	September 10, 2010	Kitt Peak	Spacewatch	·	1.9 km	MPC · JPL
706696	2010 RT_{100}	—	September 10, 2010	Kitt Peak	Spacewatch	HOF	2.1 km	MPC · JPL
706697	2010 RP_{110}	—	September 11, 2010	Kitt Peak	Spacewatch	·	500 m	MPC · JPL
706698	2010 RB_{114}	—	September 11, 2010	Kitt Peak	Spacewatch	·	930 m	MPC · JPL
706699	2010 RD_{114}	—	September 11, 2010	Kitt Peak	Spacewatch	·	1.8 km	MPC · JPL
706700	2010 RG_{120}	—	August 26, 2000	Kitt Peak	Spacewatch	·	2.6 km	MPC · JPL

== 706701–706800 ==
back to top

Designation			Discovery			Properties		Ref
Permanent	Provisional	Named after	Date	Site	Discoverer(s)	Category	Diam.	Ref
706701	2010 RA_{123}	—	September 4, 2010	Mount Lemmon	Mount Lemmon Survey	H	610 m	MPC · JPL
706702	2010 RT_{124}	—	September 12, 2010	Kitt Peak	Spacewatch	MAS	630 m	MPC · JPL
706703	2010 RJ_{127}	—	September 12, 2010	Kitt Peak	Spacewatch	KOR	1.1 km	MPC · JPL
706704	2010 RY_{138}	—	September 30, 2016	Haleakala	Pan-STARRS 1	·	2.3 km	MPC · JPL
706705	2010 RJ_{142}	—	November 18, 2007	Mount Lemmon	Mount Lemmon Survey	V	530 m	MPC · JPL
706706	2010 RS_{142}	—	September 14, 2010	Kitt Peak	Spacewatch	·	1.6 km	MPC · JPL
706707	2010 RG_{150}	—	September 15, 2010	Kitt Peak	Spacewatch	·	1.8 km	MPC · JPL
706708	2010 RD_{154}	—	September 15, 2010	Kitt Peak	Spacewatch	·	920 m	MPC · JPL
706709	2010 RU_{156}	—	September 15, 2010	Mount Lemmon	Mount Lemmon Survey	·	730 m	MPC · JPL
706710	2010 RS_{158}	—	October 15, 2006	Kitt Peak	Spacewatch	·	1.7 km	MPC · JPL
706711	2010 RB_{159}	—	December 4, 2007	Mount Lemmon	Mount Lemmon Survey	·	800 m	MPC · JPL
706712	2010 RM_{169}	—	September 2, 2010	Mount Lemmon	Mount Lemmon Survey	·	620 m	MPC · JPL
706713	2010 RH_{170}	—	February 26, 2008	Mount Lemmon	Mount Lemmon Survey	KOR	1.1 km	MPC · JPL
706714	2010 RX_{170}	—	September 4, 2010	Mount Lemmon	Mount Lemmon Survey	·	750 m	MPC · JPL
706715	2010 RD_{175}	—	September 9, 2010	Kitt Peak	Spacewatch	·	860 m	MPC · JPL
706716	2010 RM_{175}	—	September 13, 1999	Kitt Peak	Spacewatch	V	440 m	MPC · JPL
706717	2010 RH_{180}	—	September 11, 2010	Mount Lemmon	Mount Lemmon Survey	·	1.4 km	MPC · JPL
706718	2010 RD_{182}	—	December 13, 2007	Socorro	LINEAR	·	860 m	MPC · JPL
706719	2010 RJ_{182}	—	January 29, 2003	Apache Point	SDSS Collaboration	·	1.7 km	MPC · JPL
706720	2010 RT_{182}	—	September 17, 2010	Mount Lemmon	Mount Lemmon Survey	·	1.7 km	MPC · JPL
706721	2010 RC_{185}	—	September 3, 2010	Mount Lemmon	Mount Lemmon Survey	·	1.8 km	MPC · JPL
706722	2010 RT_{191}	—	September 15, 2010	Mount Lemmon	Mount Lemmon Survey	·	930 m	MPC · JPL
706723	2010 RB_{193}	—	November 24, 2011	Mount Lemmon	Mount Lemmon Survey	·	1.7 km	MPC · JPL
706724	2010 RO_{194}	—	July 23, 2015	Haleakala	Pan-STARRS 1	·	1.9 km	MPC · JPL
706725	2010 RT_{195}	—	June 27, 2015	Haleakala	Pan-STARRS 1	·	1.5 km	MPC · JPL
706726	2010 RY_{196}	—	May 8, 2013	Haleakala	Pan-STARRS 1	·	750 m	MPC · JPL
706727	2010 RJ_{198}	—	September 10, 2010	Kitt Peak	Spacewatch	·	1.7 km	MPC · JPL
706728	2010 RO_{198}	—	January 16, 2018	Haleakala	Pan-STARRS 1	·	2.0 km	MPC · JPL
706729	2010 RT_{198}	—	September 4, 2014	Haleakala	Pan-STARRS 1	HNS	1 km	MPC · JPL
706730	2010 RU_{200}	—	July 25, 2015	Haleakala	Pan-STARRS 1	·	1.7 km	MPC · JPL
706731	2010 RY_{201}	—	August 28, 2016	Mount Lemmon	Mount Lemmon Survey	VER	2.2 km	MPC · JPL
706732	2010 RH_{203}	—	December 23, 2016	Haleakala	Pan-STARRS 1	·	1.7 km	MPC · JPL
706733	2010 RW_{205}	—	September 3, 2010	Mount Lemmon	Mount Lemmon Survey	V	440 m	MPC · JPL
706734	2010 RS_{206}	—	September 10, 2010	Kitt Peak	Spacewatch	KOR	1.2 km	MPC · JPL
706735	2010 RT_{206}	—	September 4, 2010	Kitt Peak	Spacewatch	·	610 m	MPC · JPL
706736	2010 RZ_{207}	—	September 4, 2010	Mount Lemmon	Mount Lemmon Survey	PHO	540 m	MPC · JPL
706737	2010 RG_{210}	—	September 3, 2010	Mount Lemmon	Mount Lemmon Survey	·	1.5 km	MPC · JPL
706738	2010 RW_{220}	—	September 5, 2010	Mount Lemmon	Mount Lemmon Survey	·	560 m	MPC · JPL
706739	2010 RB_{224}	—	September 15, 2010	Mount Lemmon	Mount Lemmon Survey	·	1.2 km	MPC · JPL
706740	2010 SB_{1}	—	September 16, 2010	Mount Lemmon	Mount Lemmon Survey	·	2.2 km	MPC · JPL
706741	2010 SN_{1}	—	September 16, 2010	Mount Lemmon	Mount Lemmon Survey	T_{j} (2.93)	3.4 km	MPC · JPL
706742	2010 SW_{9}	—	September 17, 2010	Kachina	Hobart, J.	V	640 m	MPC · JPL
706743	2010 SR_{17}	—	March 8, 2005	Mount Lemmon	Mount Lemmon Survey	·	580 m	MPC · JPL
706744	2010 SH_{22}	—	December 21, 2006	Kitt Peak	Spacewatch	KOR	1.3 km	MPC · JPL
706745	2010 SM_{27}	—	January 30, 2004	Kitt Peak	Spacewatch	·	820 m	MPC · JPL
706746	2010 SN_{27}	—	November 15, 2003	Kitt Peak	Spacewatch	·	790 m	MPC · JPL
706747	2010 SG_{38}	—	April 30, 2014	Haleakala	Pan-STARRS 1	·	2.1 km	MPC · JPL
706748	2010 SM_{45}	—	September 17, 2010	Mount Lemmon	Mount Lemmon Survey	·	800 m	MPC · JPL
706749	2010 SU_{45}	—	November 16, 2011	Mount Lemmon	Mount Lemmon Survey	·	1.7 km	MPC · JPL
706750	2010 SK_{46}	—	September 16, 2010	Kitt Peak	Spacewatch	·	710 m	MPC · JPL
706751	2010 SP_{46}	—	August 12, 2015	Haleakala	Pan-STARRS 1	·	1.4 km	MPC · JPL
706752	2010 ST_{46}	—	October 1, 2003	Kitt Peak	Spacewatch	·	640 m	MPC · JPL
706753	2010 SA_{50}	—	September 16, 2010	Kitt Peak	Spacewatch	·	1.7 km	MPC · JPL
706754	2010 SM_{52}	—	August 9, 2005	Cerro Tololo	Deep Ecliptic Survey	KOR	1.0 km	MPC · JPL
706755	2010 SQ_{52}	—	September 18, 2010	Mount Lemmon	Mount Lemmon Survey	BRA	1.2 km	MPC · JPL
706756	2010 SE_{56}	—	September 29, 2010	Mount Lemmon	Mount Lemmon Survey	HOF	1.8 km	MPC · JPL
706757	2010 SX_{56}	—	September 18, 2010	Mount Lemmon	Mount Lemmon Survey	·	1.6 km	MPC · JPL
706758	2010 SK_{57}	—	September 18, 2010	Mount Lemmon	Mount Lemmon Survey	·	1.6 km	MPC · JPL
706759	2010 ST_{57}	—	September 18, 2010	Kitt Peak	Spacewatch	KOR	1.2 km	MPC · JPL
706760	2010 SD_{58}	—	September 29, 2010	Mount Lemmon	Mount Lemmon Survey	KOR	970 m	MPC · JPL
706761	2010 SF_{59}	—	September 30, 2010	Mount Lemmon	Mount Lemmon Survey	·	1.5 km	MPC · JPL
706762	2010 ST_{63}	—	September 30, 2010	Mount Lemmon	Mount Lemmon Survey	·	2.1 km	MPC · JPL
706763	2010 SC_{65}	—	September 1, 2010	Mount Lemmon	Mount Lemmon Survey	BRA	1.2 km	MPC · JPL
706764	2010 SO_{66}	—	September 29, 2010	Mount Lemmon	Mount Lemmon Survey	·	2.1 km	MPC · JPL
706765	2010 TK_{7}	—	October 1, 2010	WISE	WISE	ATE	380 m	MPC · JPL
706766	2010 TJ_{8}	—	March 10, 2008	Kitt Peak	Spacewatch	·	1.5 km	MPC · JPL
706767	2010 TE_{10}	—	September 2, 2010	Mount Lemmon	Mount Lemmon Survey	·	940 m	MPC · JPL
706768	2010 TF_{10}	—	August 29, 2005	Kitt Peak	Spacewatch	·	1.6 km	MPC · JPL
706769	2010 TH_{25}	—	September 13, 2010	Bisei	BATTeRS	·	2.2 km	MPC · JPL
706770	2010 TT_{30}	—	November 17, 2006	Mount Lemmon	Mount Lemmon Survey	·	1.3 km	MPC · JPL
706771	2010 TF_{31}	—	October 2, 2010	Kitt Peak	Spacewatch	KOR	1.0 km	MPC · JPL
706772	2010 TP_{31}	—	October 2, 2010	Kitt Peak	Spacewatch	V	380 m	MPC · JPL
706773	2010 TR_{51}	—	October 8, 2010	Kitt Peak	Spacewatch	·	1.6 km	MPC · JPL
706774	2010 TV_{55}	—	September 10, 2010	Kitt Peak	Spacewatch	·	1.9 km	MPC · JPL
706775	2010 TU_{56}	—	October 3, 2010	Kitt Peak	Spacewatch	·	1.5 km	MPC · JPL
706776	2010 TK_{59}	—	October 7, 2010	Piszkés-tető	K. Sárneczky, Z. Kuli	·	1.9 km	MPC · JPL
706777	2010 TP_{59}	—	October 7, 2010	Piszkés-tető	K. Sárneczky, Z. Kuli	V	490 m	MPC · JPL
706778	2010 TA_{66}	—	September 10, 2010	Mount Lemmon	Mount Lemmon Survey	·	840 m	MPC · JPL
706779	2010 TT_{67}	—	March 12, 2005	Kitt Peak	Deep Ecliptic Survey	V	490 m	MPC · JPL
706780	2010 TX_{67}	—	November 20, 2006	Kitt Peak	Spacewatch	·	1.4 km	MPC · JPL
706781	2010 TS_{71}	—	March 3, 2005	Kitt Peak	Spacewatch	NYS	1.0 km	MPC · JPL
706782	2010 TP_{85}	—	September 12, 2005	Kitt Peak	Spacewatch	BRA	1.1 km	MPC · JPL
706783	2010 TO_{88}	—	October 1, 2010	Mount Lemmon	Mount Lemmon Survey	KOR	1.4 km	MPC · JPL
706784	2010 TG_{94}	—	October 1, 2010	Mount Lemmon	Mount Lemmon Survey	·	1.7 km	MPC · JPL
706785	2010 TW_{94}	—	October 1, 2010	Kitt Peak	Spacewatch	KOR	1.0 km	MPC · JPL
706786	2010 TP_{99}	—	August 24, 2001	Kitt Peak	Spacewatch	·	1.3 km	MPC · JPL
706787	2010 TD_{102}	—	September 30, 2010	Mount Lemmon	Mount Lemmon Survey	·	1.1 km	MPC · JPL
706788	2010 TT_{104}	—	October 3, 2003	Kitt Peak	Spacewatch	·	890 m	MPC · JPL
706789	2010 TL_{110}	—	October 9, 2010	Mount Lemmon	Mount Lemmon Survey	·	1.7 km	MPC · JPL
706790	2010 TS_{110}	—	October 9, 2010	Mount Lemmon	Mount Lemmon Survey	·	790 m	MPC · JPL
706791	2010 TL_{121}	—	October 20, 2003	Kitt Peak	Spacewatch	V	490 m	MPC · JPL
706792	2010 TP_{123}	—	October 8, 2010	Kitt Peak	Spacewatch	NYS	960 m	MPC · JPL
706793	2010 TH_{141}	—	January 24, 2007	Mount Lemmon	Mount Lemmon Survey	·	1.6 km	MPC · JPL
706794	2010 TO_{154}	—	September 18, 2010	Mount Lemmon	Mount Lemmon Survey	·	700 m	MPC · JPL
706795	2010 TT_{155}	—	March 5, 2008	Kitt Peak	Spacewatch	·	1.6 km	MPC · JPL
706796	2010 TA_{156}	—	September 16, 2010	Kitt Peak	Spacewatch	·	1.6 km	MPC · JPL
706797	2010 TG_{157}	—	October 10, 2010	Kitt Peak	Spacewatch	·	780 m	MPC · JPL
706798	2010 TA_{163}	—	October 12, 2010	Mount Lemmon	Mount Lemmon Survey	·	1.5 km	MPC · JPL
706799	2010 TE_{164}	—	October 1, 2010	Kitt Peak	Spacewatch	·	1.3 km	MPC · JPL
706800	2010 TO_{164}	—	October 13, 2010	Mount Lemmon	Mount Lemmon Survey	·	1.7 km	MPC · JPL

== 706801–706900 ==
back to top

Designation			Discovery			Properties		Ref
Permanent	Provisional	Named after	Date	Site	Discoverer(s)	Category	Diam.	Ref
706801	2010 TP_{164}	—	November 11, 2007	Mount Lemmon	Mount Lemmon Survey	·	1.3 km	MPC · JPL
706802	2010 TU_{169}	—	October 11, 2010	Mount Lemmon	Mount Lemmon Survey	L4	7.7 km	MPC · JPL
706803	2010 TW_{169}	—	October 11, 2010	Mount Lemmon	Mount Lemmon Survey	·	1.6 km	MPC · JPL
706804	2010 TE_{181}	—	January 19, 2004	Kitt Peak	Spacewatch	MAS	620 m	MPC · JPL
706805	2010 TA_{184}	—	January 27, 2012	Mount Lemmon	Mount Lemmon Survey	·	1.8 km	MPC · JPL
706806	2010 TN_{185}	—	October 2, 2003	Kitt Peak	Spacewatch	·	680 m	MPC · JPL
706807	2010 TY_{185}	—	October 14, 2010	Mount Lemmon	Mount Lemmon Survey	·	2.1 km	MPC · JPL
706808	2010 TT_{192}	—	October 7, 2010	Catalina	CSS	·	1.8 km	MPC · JPL
706809	2010 TJ_{194}	—	October 1, 2005	Kitt Peak	Spacewatch	KOR	1.1 km	MPC · JPL
706810	2010 TT_{196}	—	December 29, 2014	Mount Lemmon	Mount Lemmon Survey	·	730 m	MPC · JPL
706811	2010 TF_{197}	—	October 13, 2010	Mount Lemmon	Mount Lemmon Survey	·	2.1 km	MPC · JPL
706812	2010 TO_{198}	—	February 14, 2013	Haleakala	Pan-STARRS 1	·	2.4 km	MPC · JPL
706813	2010 TL_{200}	—	October 2, 2010	Mount Lemmon	Mount Lemmon Survey	·	860 m	MPC · JPL
706814	2010 TS_{203}	—	October 2, 2010	Kitt Peak	Spacewatch	3:2	3.9 km	MPC · JPL
706815	2010 TF_{207}	—	September 9, 2015	Haleakala	Pan-STARRS 1	KOR	970 m	MPC · JPL
706816	2010 TV_{212}	—	October 1, 2010	Kitt Peak	Spacewatch	·	950 m	MPC · JPL
706817	2010 TQ_{213}	—	October 2, 2010	Mount Lemmon	Mount Lemmon Survey	·	1.2 km	MPC · JPL
706818	2010 TQ_{215}	—	October 9, 2010	Mount Lemmon	Mount Lemmon Survey	KOR	1.0 km	MPC · JPL
706819	2010 TS_{217}	—	October 12, 2010	Mount Lemmon	Mount Lemmon Survey	KOR	1.0 km	MPC · JPL
706820	2010 TG_{219}	—	October 7, 2010	Kitt Peak	Spacewatch	·	1.3 km	MPC · JPL
706821	2010 TN_{220}	—	October 13, 2010	Mount Lemmon	Mount Lemmon Survey	EOS	1.6 km	MPC · JPL
706822	2010 TV_{221}	—	October 14, 2010	Mount Lemmon	Mount Lemmon Survey	EOS	1.3 km	MPC · JPL
706823	2010 TK_{222}	—	October 8, 2010	Kitt Peak	Spacewatch	KOR	1.0 km	MPC · JPL
706824	2010 TE_{223}	—	October 12, 2010	Kitt Peak	Spacewatch	KOR	1.0 km	MPC · JPL
706825	2010 TJ_{224}	—	October 12, 2010	Mount Lemmon	Mount Lemmon Survey	·	950 m	MPC · JPL
706826	2010 TF_{232}	—	October 12, 2010	Mount Lemmon	Mount Lemmon Survey	·	2.3 km	MPC · JPL
706827	2010 TQ_{233}	—	October 1, 2010	Mount Lemmon	Mount Lemmon Survey	KOR	1.0 km	MPC · JPL
706828	2010 TJ_{234}	—	October 10, 2015	Haleakala	Pan-STARRS 1	KOR	1.0 km	MPC · JPL
706829	2010 TK_{234}	—	October 11, 2010	Mount Lemmon	Mount Lemmon Survey	·	610 m	MPC · JPL
706830	2010 UN_{20}	—	October 28, 2010	Mount Lemmon	Mount Lemmon Survey	·	910 m	MPC · JPL
706831	2010 UJ_{22}	—	October 28, 2010	Mount Lemmon	Mount Lemmon Survey	·	900 m	MPC · JPL
706832	2010 UH_{27}	—	October 28, 2010	Mount Lemmon	Mount Lemmon Survey	·	640 m	MPC · JPL
706833	2010 UV_{27}	—	October 28, 2010	Mount Lemmon	Mount Lemmon Survey	·	2.5 km	MPC · JPL
706834	2010 UN_{29}	—	October 28, 2010	Piszkés-tető	K. Sárneczky, S. Kürti	·	1.5 km	MPC · JPL
706835	2010 UW_{40}	—	October 29, 2010	Piszkés-tető	K. Sárneczky, Z. Kuli	·	830 m	MPC · JPL
706836	2010 UV_{42}	—	October 19, 2010	Mount Lemmon	Mount Lemmon Survey	·	2.1 km	MPC · JPL
706837	2010 UO_{44}	—	October 30, 2010	Mount Lemmon	Mount Lemmon Survey	·	1.1 km	MPC · JPL
706838	2010 US_{47}	—	October 30, 2010	Piszkés-tető	K. Sárneczky, Z. Kuli	·	1.8 km	MPC · JPL
706839	2010 UH_{53}	—	August 27, 2006	Kitt Peak	Spacewatch	·	890 m	MPC · JPL
706840	2010 UF_{54}	—	April 16, 2009	Catalina	CSS	·	760 m	MPC · JPL
706841	2010 UC_{58}	—	October 29, 2010	Kitt Peak	Spacewatch	·	3.0 km	MPC · JPL
706842	2010 UN_{59}	—	October 29, 2010	Kitt Peak	Spacewatch	·	2.8 km	MPC · JPL
706843	2010 UW_{67}	—	October 28, 2010	Catalina	CSS	·	850 m	MPC · JPL
706844	2010 UF_{68}	—	October 11, 2010	Mount Lemmon	Mount Lemmon Survey	·	1.9 km	MPC · JPL
706845	2010 UR_{71}	—	September 10, 2010	Mount Lemmon	Mount Lemmon Survey	EOS	1.5 km	MPC · JPL
706846	2010 UH_{74}	—	October 13, 2010	Mount Lemmon	Mount Lemmon Survey	L4	6.9 km	MPC · JPL
706847	2010 UU_{78}	—	September 3, 2010	Mount Lemmon	Mount Lemmon Survey	EOS	1.6 km	MPC · JPL
706848	2010 UV_{78}	—	October 30, 2010	Mount Lemmon	Mount Lemmon Survey	·	2.0 km	MPC · JPL
706849	2010 UD_{82}	—	March 24, 2009	Mount Lemmon	Mount Lemmon Survey	·	640 m	MPC · JPL
706850	2010 UH_{84}	—	October 30, 2010	Mount Lemmon	Mount Lemmon Survey	·	1.5 km	MPC · JPL
706851	2010 UV_{88}	—	October 31, 2010	ESA OGS	ESA OGS	KOR	1.6 km	MPC · JPL
706852	2010 UW_{102}	—	November 11, 2010	Mount Lemmon	Mount Lemmon Survey	EOS	1.4 km	MPC · JPL
706853	2010 UC_{104}	—	November 2, 2010	Mount Lemmon	Mount Lemmon Survey	KOR	1.2 km	MPC · JPL
706854	2010 UH_{105}	—	November 3, 2010	Mount Lemmon	Mount Lemmon Survey	KOR	1.1 km	MPC · JPL
706855	2010 UD_{106}	—	September 3, 2010	Mount Lemmon	Mount Lemmon Survey	·	1.8 km	MPC · JPL
706856	2010 UX_{109}	—	October 31, 2010	Mount Lemmon	Mount Lemmon Survey	CLA	1.1 km	MPC · JPL
706857	2010 UW_{110}	—	October 31, 2010	Piszkés-tető	K. Sárneczky, Z. Kuli	·	860 m	MPC · JPL
706858	2010 UB_{112}	—	October 19, 2010	Mount Lemmon	Mount Lemmon Survey	·	1.7 km	MPC · JPL
706859	2010 UT_{113}	—	October 31, 2010	Mount Lemmon	Mount Lemmon Survey	NAE	2.0 km	MPC · JPL
706860	2010 UL_{116}	—	October 31, 2005	Mount Lemmon	Mount Lemmon Survey	·	1.3 km	MPC · JPL
706861	2010 UW_{116}	—	August 18, 2017	Haleakala	Pan-STARRS 1	V	490 m	MPC · JPL
706862	2010 UC_{120}	—	October 17, 2010	Mount Lemmon	Mount Lemmon Survey	·	840 m	MPC · JPL
706863	2010 UQ_{120}	—	October 29, 2010	Mount Lemmon	Mount Lemmon Survey	VER	1.9 km	MPC · JPL
706864	2010 UC_{122}	—	October 17, 2010	Kitt Peak	Spacewatch	·	710 m	MPC · JPL
706865	2010 UU_{122}	—	October 28, 2010	Mount Lemmon	Mount Lemmon Survey	KOR	1.2 km	MPC · JPL
706866	2010 UW_{122}	—	October 31, 2010	Kitt Peak	Spacewatch	·	1.9 km	MPC · JPL
706867	2010 UB_{127}	—	October 30, 2010	Mount Lemmon	Mount Lemmon Survey	·	2.4 km	MPC · JPL
706868	2010 UW_{127}	—	October 30, 2010	Mount Lemmon	Mount Lemmon Survey	·	890 m	MPC · JPL
706869	2010 UC_{128}	—	October 29, 2010	Mount Lemmon	Mount Lemmon Survey	·	2.0 km	MPC · JPL
706870	2010 UP_{130}	—	October 12, 2010	Mount Lemmon	Mount Lemmon Survey	·	2.3 km	MPC · JPL
706871	2010 US_{132}	—	October 30, 2010	Mount Lemmon	Mount Lemmon Survey	·	680 m	MPC · JPL
706872	2010 UT_{133}	—	October 31, 2010	Piszkés-tető	K. Sárneczky, Z. Kuli	·	940 m	MPC · JPL
706873	2010 UO_{134}	—	October 30, 2010	Mount Lemmon	Mount Lemmon Survey	·	1.6 km	MPC · JPL
706874	2010 VS_{1}	—	November 1, 2010	Mount Lemmon	Mount Lemmon Survey	·	1.6 km	MPC · JPL
706875	2010 VW_{1}	—	December 18, 2007	Mount Lemmon	Mount Lemmon Survey	·	1.3 km	MPC · JPL
706876	2010 VN_{4}	—	July 31, 2006	Siding Spring	SSS	·	1.1 km	MPC · JPL
706877	2010 VU_{10}	—	November 1, 2010	Mount Lemmon	Mount Lemmon Survey	·	3.4 km	MPC · JPL
706878	2010 VA_{13}	—	September 11, 2010	Mount Lemmon	Mount Lemmon Survey	·	970 m	MPC · JPL
706879	2010 VY_{13}	—	February 9, 2004	Palomar	NEAT	·	1.2 km	MPC · JPL
706880	2010 VW_{15}	—	November 2, 2010	Mount Lemmon	Mount Lemmon Survey	·	590 m	MPC · JPL
706881	2010 VR_{16}	—	September 25, 2006	Mount Lemmon	Mount Lemmon Survey	PHO	770 m	MPC · JPL
706882 Hertageßner	2010 VV_{20}	Hertageßner	November 3, 2010	Tzec Maun	E. Schwab	T_{j} (2.96) · 3:2	4.8 km	MPC · JPL
706883	2010 VN_{26}	—	May 3, 2008	Mount Lemmon	Mount Lemmon Survey	·	1.7 km	MPC · JPL
706884	2010 VA_{41}	—	November 1, 2010	Mount Lemmon	Mount Lemmon Survey	·	1.1 km	MPC · JPL
706885	2010 VG_{41}	—	September 16, 2010	Mount Lemmon	Mount Lemmon Survey	·	2.5 km	MPC · JPL
706886	2010 VP_{44}	—	September 18, 2010	Mount Lemmon	Mount Lemmon Survey	·	1.4 km	MPC · JPL
706887	2010 VU_{46}	—	July 30, 2009	Kitt Peak	Spacewatch	EOS	1.4 km	MPC · JPL
706888	2010 VE_{50}	—	November 3, 2010	Kitt Peak	Spacewatch	·	700 m	MPC · JPL
706889	2010 VG_{64}	—	November 6, 2010	Mount Lemmon	Mount Lemmon Survey	MRX	950 m	MPC · JPL
706890	2010 VS_{64}	—	November 6, 2010	Mount Lemmon	Mount Lemmon Survey	L4	6.5 km	MPC · JPL
706891	2010 VD_{76}	—	November 1, 2010	Piszkés-tető	K. Sárneczky, Z. Kuli	T_{j} (2.9) · 3:2	5.8 km	MPC · JPL
706892	2010 VG_{77}	—	November 2, 2010	Mount Lemmon	Mount Lemmon Survey	·	1.1 km	MPC · JPL
706893	2010 VU_{77}	—	November 3, 2010	Mount Lemmon	Mount Lemmon Survey	VER	2.0 km	MPC · JPL
706894	2010 VF_{84}	—	November 5, 2010	Kitt Peak	Spacewatch	·	1.8 km	MPC · JPL
706895	2010 VX_{84}	—	November 5, 2010	Kitt Peak	Spacewatch	·	1.1 km	MPC · JPL
706896	2010 VO_{86}	—	November 5, 2010	Bisei	BATTeRS	H	580 m	MPC · JPL
706897	2010 VQ_{89}	—	February 10, 1996	Kitt Peak	Spacewatch	·	980 m	MPC · JPL
706898	2010 VL_{96}	—	April 30, 2009	Kitt Peak	Spacewatch	·	590 m	MPC · JPL
706899	2010 VE_{104}	—	November 5, 2010	Kitt Peak	Spacewatch	EOS	1.7 km	MPC · JPL
706900	2010 VW_{108}	—	November 6, 2010	Mount Lemmon	Mount Lemmon Survey	·	1.5 km	MPC · JPL

== 706901–707000 ==
back to top

Designation			Discovery			Properties		Ref
Permanent	Provisional	Named after	Date	Site	Discoverer(s)	Category	Diam.	Ref
706901	2010 VZ_{108}	—	November 6, 2010	Mount Lemmon	Mount Lemmon Survey	V	510 m	MPC · JPL
706902	2010 VF_{123}	—	November 8, 2010	Mount Lemmon	Mount Lemmon Survey	·	1.0 km	MPC · JPL
706903	2010 VV_{136}	—	November 10, 2010	Kitt Peak	Spacewatch	KOR	1.1 km	MPC · JPL
706904	2010 VF_{140}	—	November 2, 2010	Mount Lemmon	Mount Lemmon Survey	KOR	1.0 km	MPC · JPL
706905	2010 VX_{142}	—	September 25, 2006	Mount Lemmon	Mount Lemmon Survey	·	1.0 km	MPC · JPL
706906	2010 VH_{145}	—	November 6, 2010	Mount Lemmon	Mount Lemmon Survey	·	760 m	MPC · JPL
706907	2010 VO_{149}	—	November 6, 2010	Mount Lemmon	Mount Lemmon Survey	·	1.2 km	MPC · JPL
706908	2010 VX_{152}	—	September 27, 2006	Kitt Peak	Spacewatch	MAS	650 m	MPC · JPL
706909	2010 VX_{154}	—	November 7, 2010	Mount Lemmon	Mount Lemmon Survey	·	890 m	MPC · JPL
706910	2010 VK_{155}	—	November 7, 2010	Mount Lemmon	Mount Lemmon Survey	·	2.3 km	MPC · JPL
706911	2010 VW_{157}	—	November 8, 2010	Mount Lemmon	Mount Lemmon Survey	·	2.0 km	MPC · JPL
706912	2010 VZ_{157}	—	November 8, 2010	Mount Lemmon	Mount Lemmon Survey	·	1.7 km	MPC · JPL
706913	2010 VR_{166}	—	November 10, 2010	Mount Lemmon	Mount Lemmon Survey	·	1.5 km	MPC · JPL
706914	2010 VO_{171}	—	August 22, 2006	Palomar	NEAT	·	910 m	MPC · JPL
706915	2010 VM_{172}	—	September 18, 2006	Anderson Mesa	LONEOS	·	930 m	MPC · JPL
706916	2010 VU_{175}	—	November 11, 2010	Charleston	R. Holmes	·	2.7 km	MPC · JPL
706917	2010 VZ_{186}	—	November 13, 2010	Mount Lemmon	Mount Lemmon Survey	·	2.1 km	MPC · JPL
706918	2010 VZ_{198}	—	September 18, 2010	Mount Lemmon	Mount Lemmon Survey	·	1.5 km	MPC · JPL
706919	2010 VZ_{205}	—	February 28, 2008	Mount Lemmon	Mount Lemmon Survey	·	1.1 km	MPC · JPL
706920	2010 VP_{206}	—	October 11, 2010	Mount Lemmon	Mount Lemmon Survey	EOS	1.7 km	MPC · JPL
706921	2010 VJ_{213}	—	October 10, 2005	Kitt Peak	Spacewatch	NAE	1.9 km	MPC · JPL
706922	2010 VL_{218}	—	October 17, 2010	Mount Lemmon	Mount Lemmon Survey	·	1.7 km	MPC · JPL
706923	2010 VL_{219}	—	November 14, 2010	Zelenchukskaya Station	Satovski, B.	·	2.8 km	MPC · JPL
706924	2010 VZ_{219}	—	November 11, 2010	Mount Lemmon	Mount Lemmon Survey	V	530 m	MPC · JPL
706925	2010 VN_{229}	—	November 6, 2010	Mount Lemmon	Mount Lemmon Survey	·	880 m	MPC · JPL
706926	2010 VW_{229}	—	November 14, 2010	Mount Lemmon	Mount Lemmon Survey	·	2.5 km	MPC · JPL
706927	2010 VD_{230}	—	November 6, 2010	Mount Lemmon	Mount Lemmon Survey	·	1.4 km	MPC · JPL
706928	2010 VH_{230}	—	November 11, 2010	Mount Lemmon	Mount Lemmon Survey	·	760 m	MPC · JPL
706929	2010 VN_{231}	—	April 11, 2013	Mount Lemmon	Mount Lemmon Survey	EOS	1.5 km	MPC · JPL
706930	2010 VD_{232}	—	September 2, 2014	Haleakala	Pan-STARRS 1	·	1.7 km	MPC · JPL
706931	2010 VM_{232}	—	September 25, 2014	Mount Lemmon	Mount Lemmon Survey	·	2.0 km	MPC · JPL
706932	2010 VU_{241}	—	January 4, 2017	Haleakala	Pan-STARRS 1	·	1.7 km	MPC · JPL
706933	2010 VW_{242}	—	September 12, 2015	Haleakala	Pan-STARRS 1	·	2.1 km	MPC · JPL
706934	2010 VA_{245}	—	November 1, 2010	Mount Lemmon	Mount Lemmon Survey	·	2.5 km	MPC · JPL
706935	2010 VP_{245}	—	October 9, 2015	Haleakala	Pan-STARRS 1	·	1.5 km	MPC · JPL
706936	2010 VG_{251}	—	November 8, 2010	Mount Lemmon	Mount Lemmon Survey	EOS	1.3 km	MPC · JPL
706937	2010 VS_{252}	—	November 6, 2010	Kitt Peak	Spacewatch	·	3.2 km	MPC · JPL
706938	2010 VA_{253}	—	November 12, 2010	Mount Lemmon	Mount Lemmon Survey	·	2.3 km	MPC · JPL
706939	2010 VQ_{256}	—	November 2, 2010	Mount Lemmon	Mount Lemmon Survey	EOS	1.6 km	MPC · JPL
706940	2010 VQ_{264}	—	December 21, 2006	Kitt Peak	L. H. Wasserman, M. W. Buie	KOR	1.1 km	MPC · JPL
706941	2010 VW_{264}	—	November 2, 2010	Mount Lemmon	Mount Lemmon Survey	·	2.2 km	MPC · JPL
706942	2010 VL_{266}	—	November 2, 2010	Mount Lemmon	Mount Lemmon Survey	·	820 m	MPC · JPL
706943	2010 VS_{271}	—	October 31, 2010	Mount Lemmon	Mount Lemmon Survey	·	2.6 km	MPC · JPL
706944	2010 VW_{278}	—	November 12, 2005	Kitt Peak	Spacewatch	·	2.0 km	MPC · JPL
706945	2010 VM_{281}	—	November 10, 2010	Kitt Peak	Spacewatch	EOS	1.5 km	MPC · JPL
706946	2010 WP_{12}	—	November 8, 2010	Mauna Kea	Forshay, P., M. Micheli	NYS	920 m	MPC · JPL
706947	2010 WO_{18}	—	November 27, 2010	Mount Lemmon	Mount Lemmon Survey	·	560 m	MPC · JPL
706948	2010 WJ_{20}	—	November 11, 2010	Mount Lemmon	Mount Lemmon Survey	EOS	1.4 km	MPC · JPL
706949	2010 WO_{22}	—	November 13, 2010	Mount Lemmon	Mount Lemmon Survey	·	1.3 km	MPC · JPL
706950	2010 WG_{26}	—	November 6, 2010	Kitt Peak	Spacewatch	·	2.2 km	MPC · JPL
706951	2010 WB_{36}	—	November 30, 2005	Kitt Peak	Spacewatch	·	1.6 km	MPC · JPL
706952	2010 WE_{37}	—	November 27, 2010	Mount Lemmon	Mount Lemmon Survey	NYS	1.0 km	MPC · JPL
706953	2010 WL_{41}	—	November 27, 2010	Mount Lemmon	Mount Lemmon Survey	L4	6.5 km	MPC · JPL
706954	2010 WQ_{41}	—	November 27, 2010	Mount Lemmon	Mount Lemmon Survey	EOS	1.4 km	MPC · JPL
706955	2010 WL_{46}	—	October 14, 2010	Mount Lemmon	Mount Lemmon Survey	·	1.4 km	MPC · JPL
706956	2010 WA_{47}	—	November 10, 2010	Mount Lemmon	Mount Lemmon Survey	·	2.4 km	MPC · JPL
706957	2010 WQ_{47}	—	October 30, 2005	Mount Lemmon	Mount Lemmon Survey	·	2.0 km	MPC · JPL
706958	2010 WJ_{56}	—	October 29, 2010	Catalina	CSS	·	1.0 km	MPC · JPL
706959	2010 WH_{57}	—	November 8, 2010	Kitt Peak	Spacewatch	MAS	490 m	MPC · JPL
706960	2010 WX_{58}	—	October 3, 2006	Mount Lemmon	Mount Lemmon Survey	·	920 m	MPC · JPL
706961	2010 WX_{60}	—	November 27, 2010	Mount Lemmon	Mount Lemmon Survey	L4	6.5 km	MPC · JPL
706962	2010 WS_{64}	—	November 28, 2010	Mount Lemmon	Mount Lemmon Survey	·	1.5 km	MPC · JPL
706963	2010 WG_{65}	—	January 28, 2006	Palomar	NEAT	EUP	3.8 km	MPC · JPL
706964	2010 WP_{69}	—	November 30, 2010	Mount Lemmon	Mount Lemmon Survey	·	1.7 km	MPC · JPL
706965	2010 WG_{71}	—	November 14, 2010	Kitt Peak	Spacewatch	·	560 m	MPC · JPL
706966	2010 WH_{71}	—	November 30, 2010	Mount Lemmon	Mount Lemmon Survey	·	1.7 km	MPC · JPL
706967	2010 WK_{75}	—	November 25, 2010	Mount Lemmon	Mount Lemmon Survey	MAS	620 m	MPC · JPL
706968	2010 WR_{75}	—	November 30, 2010	Mount Lemmon	Mount Lemmon Survey	·	2.7 km	MPC · JPL
706969	2010 WD_{78}	—	November 30, 2010	Mount Lemmon	Mount Lemmon Survey	EOS	1.6 km	MPC · JPL
706970	2010 WY_{79}	—	November 16, 2010	Mount Lemmon	Mount Lemmon Survey	EUP	3.5 km	MPC · JPL
706971	2010 XL_{1}	—	November 6, 2010	Mount Lemmon	Mount Lemmon Survey	·	2.1 km	MPC · JPL
706972	2010 XB_{14}	—	December 3, 2010	Mount Lemmon	Mount Lemmon Survey	·	1.9 km	MPC · JPL
706973	2010 XM_{14}	—	November 1, 2010	Kitt Peak	Spacewatch	V	440 m	MPC · JPL
706974	2010 XJ_{18}	—	December 3, 2010	Mount Lemmon	Mount Lemmon Survey	·	1.1 km	MPC · JPL
706975	2010 XK_{27}	—	November 1, 2006	Kitt Peak	Spacewatch	·	1.0 km	MPC · JPL
706976	2010 XH_{41}	—	December 5, 2010	Kitt Peak	Spacewatch	·	1.0 km	MPC · JPL
706977	2010 XY_{52}	—	November 14, 2010	Kitt Peak	Spacewatch	·	2.4 km	MPC · JPL
706978	2010 XU_{61}	—	December 6, 2010	Mount Lemmon	Mount Lemmon Survey	V	570 m	MPC · JPL
706979	2010 XP_{64}	—	November 5, 2010	Kitt Peak	Spacewatch	·	1.5 km	MPC · JPL
706980	2010 XW_{70}	—	December 9, 2010	Mount Lemmon	Mount Lemmon Survey	·	1.7 km	MPC · JPL
706981	2010 XS_{71}	—	September 26, 2006	Catalina	CSS	·	1.0 km	MPC · JPL
706982	2010 XW_{74}	—	December 2, 2010	Mayhill-ISON	L. Elenin	H	500 m	MPC · JPL
706983	2010 XH_{93}	—	December 14, 2010	Mount Lemmon	Mount Lemmon Survey	THM	1.7 km	MPC · JPL
706984	2010 XO_{93}	—	December 14, 2010	Mount Lemmon	Mount Lemmon Survey	·	2.8 km	MPC · JPL
706985	2010 XO_{94}	—	December 14, 2010	Mount Lemmon	Mount Lemmon Survey	·	1.1 km	MPC · JPL
706986	2010 XT_{94}	—	December 6, 2010	Mount Lemmon	Mount Lemmon Survey	EOS	1.5 km	MPC · JPL
706987	2010 XX_{95}	—	April 15, 2012	Haleakala	Pan-STARRS 1	·	1.1 km	MPC · JPL
706988	2010 XM_{96}	—	December 8, 2010	Mount Lemmon	Mount Lemmon Survey	·	2.4 km	MPC · JPL
706989	2010 XF_{97}	—	December 8, 2015	Mount Lemmon	Mount Lemmon Survey	EOS	1.5 km	MPC · JPL
706990	2010 XF_{98}	—	March 3, 2006	Kitt Peak	Spacewatch	·	2.3 km	MPC · JPL
706991	2010 XP_{101}	—	August 28, 2014	Haleakala	Pan-STARRS 1	·	1.9 km	MPC · JPL
706992	2010 XX_{101}	—	February 26, 2012	Haleakala	Pan-STARRS 1	·	2.0 km	MPC · JPL
706993	2010 XK_{102}	—	April 23, 2018	Mount Lemmon	Mount Lemmon Survey	EOS	1.3 km	MPC · JPL
706994	2010 XT_{111}	—	December 11, 2010	Mount Lemmon	Mount Lemmon Survey	·	2.5 km	MPC · JPL
706995	2010 XO_{112}	—	December 1, 2010	Mount Lemmon	Mount Lemmon Survey	·	760 m	MPC · JPL
706996	2010 XT_{114}	—	December 7, 2010	Mount Lemmon	Mount Lemmon Survey	·	1.6 km	MPC · JPL
706997	2010 XX_{114}	—	December 4, 2010	Piszkés-tető	K. Sárneczky, Z. Kuli	EOS	1.5 km	MPC · JPL
706998	2010 XN_{115}	—	December 14, 2010	Mount Lemmon	Mount Lemmon Survey	·	2.4 km	MPC · JPL
706999	2010 XG_{118}	—	December 1, 2010	Mount Lemmon	Mount Lemmon Survey	·	940 m	MPC · JPL
707000	2010 XF_{123}	—	December 2, 2010	Mount Lemmon	Mount Lemmon Survey	BRA	1.2 km	MPC · JPL

back to top

== Meaning of names ==
As minor planet discoveries are confirmed, they are given a permanent number by the IAU's Minor Planet Center (MPC), and the discoverers can then submit names for them, following the IAU's naming conventions. The list below concerns those minor planets in the specified number-range that have received names, and explains the meanings of those names.

Official naming citations of newly named small Solar System bodies are approved and published in a bulletin by IAU's Working Group for Small Bodies Nomenclature (WGSBN). Before May 2021, citations were published in MPC's Minor Planet Circulars for many decades. Recent citations can also be found on the JPL Small-Body Database (SBDB). Until his death in 2016, German astronomer Lutz D. Schmadel compiled these citations into the Dictionary of Minor Planet Names (DMP) and regularly updated the collection.

Based on Paul Herget's The Names of the Minor Planets, Schmadel also researched the unclear origin of numerous asteroids, most of which had been named prior to World War II. This article incorporates text from this source, which is in the public domain: SBDB New namings may only be added to this list below after official publication as the preannouncement of names is condemned. The WGSBN publishes a comprehensive guideline for the naming rules of non-cometary small Solar System bodies.

Named minor planet	Provisional	This minor planet was named for...	Ref · Catalog
706348 Montcabrer	2009 XX	Montcabrer, a 1,389-metre mountain in the Serra Mariola Natural Park in Alicante, Spain.	IAU · 706348
706882 Hertageßner	2010 VV_{20}	Herta Lisbeth Geßner, German computer from 1956 to 1985 at the Sonneberg Observatory.	IAU · 706882
