= List of minor planets: 471001–472000 =

The following is a partial list of minor planets, running from minor-planet number 471001 through 472000, inclusive. The primary data for this and other partial lists is based on JPL's "Small-Body Orbital Elements" and data available from the Minor Planet Center. Critical list information is also provided by the MPC, unless otherwise specified from Lowell Observatory. A detailed description of the table's columns and additional sources are given on the main page including a complete list of every page in this series, and a statistical break-up on the dynamical classification of minor planets.

Also see the summary list of all named bodies in numerical and alphabetical order, and the corresponding naming citations for the number range of this particular list. New namings may only be added to this list after official publication, as the preannouncement of names is condemned by the Working Group for Small Bodies Nomenclature of the International Astronomical Union.

Near-Earth obj.	MBA (inner)	MBA (outer)	Centaur
Mars-crosser	MBA (middle)	Jupiter trojan	Trans-Neptunian obj.
Unclassified

== 471001–471100 ==
Designation			Discovery			Properties		Ref
Permanent	Provisional	Named after	Date	Site	Discoverer(s)	Category	Diam.	Ref
471001	2009 SZ_{169}	—	September 15, 2009	Mount Lemmon	Mount Lemmon Survey	H	550 m	MPC · JPL
471002	2009 SN_{170}	—	September 27, 2009	Tzec Maun	L. Elenin	·	1.4 km	MPC · JPL
471003	2009 SY_{223}	—	September 19, 2009	Kitt Peak	Spacewatch	·	850 m	MPC · JPL
471004	2009 SY_{227}	—	August 27, 2009	Kitt Peak	Spacewatch	3:2	5.6 km	MPC · JPL
471005	2009 SY_{230}	—	September 17, 2009	Kitt Peak	Spacewatch	·	1.4 km	MPC · JPL
471006	2009 SK_{235}	—	September 21, 2009	Mount Lemmon	Mount Lemmon Survey	·	980 m	MPC · JPL
471007	2009 SZ_{243}	—	September 25, 2009	La Sagra	OAM	PHO	1.1 km	MPC · JPL
471008	2009 SK_{254}	—	September 16, 2009	Kitt Peak	Spacewatch	L4	7.1 km	MPC · JPL
471009	2009 SC_{260}	—	August 16, 2009	Kitt Peak	Spacewatch	·	2.8 km	MPC · JPL
471010	2009 SV_{260}	—	October 19, 1995	Kitt Peak	Spacewatch	·	610 m	MPC · JPL
471011	2009 SD_{261}	—	July 25, 2003	Campo Imperatore	CINEOS	·	3.5 km	MPC · JPL
471012	2009 SF_{265}	—	October 19, 1998	Kitt Peak	Spacewatch	V	570 m	MPC · JPL
471013	2009 SC_{275}	—	September 17, 2009	Kitt Peak	Spacewatch	MAS	680 m	MPC · JPL
471014	2009 SG_{275}	—	September 17, 2009	Kitt Peak	Spacewatch	·	2.7 km	MPC · JPL
471015	2009 SG_{276}	—	September 25, 2009	Kitt Peak	Spacewatch	·	1.0 km	MPC · JPL
471016	2009 SV_{282}	—	September 25, 2009	Kitt Peak	Spacewatch	·	920 m	MPC · JPL
471017	2009 SZ_{282}	—	September 25, 2009	Kitt Peak	Spacewatch	·	1.0 km	MPC · JPL
471018	2009 SR_{283}	—	September 25, 2009	Kitt Peak	Spacewatch	·	930 m	MPC · JPL
471019	2009 SR_{288}	—	September 17, 2009	Kitt Peak	Spacewatch	·	1.3 km	MPC · JPL
471020	2009 SJ_{289}	—	September 17, 2009	Kitt Peak	Spacewatch	·	1.0 km	MPC · JPL
471021	2009 SB_{290}	—	September 25, 2009	Kitt Peak	Spacewatch	NYS	850 m	MPC · JPL
471022	2009 SZ_{290}	—	September 25, 2009	Kitt Peak	Spacewatch	·	1.1 km	MPC · JPL
471023	2009 SY_{293}	—	September 19, 2009	Kitt Peak	Spacewatch	·	1.3 km	MPC · JPL
471024	2009 SO_{298}	—	August 18, 2009	Catalina	CSS	V	650 m	MPC · JPL
471025	2009 SN_{300}	—	September 29, 2005	Kitt Peak	Spacewatch	·	1.3 km	MPC · JPL
471026	2009 SH_{306}	—	September 17, 2009	Kitt Peak	Spacewatch	·	2.0 km	MPC · JPL
471027	2009 SH_{316}	—	September 19, 2009	Kitt Peak	Spacewatch	·	1.0 km	MPC · JPL
471028	2009 SO_{329}	—	September 17, 2009	La Sagra	OAM	V	700 m	MPC · JPL
471029	2009 SR_{332}	—	September 22, 2009	Kitt Peak	Spacewatch	·	1.1 km	MPC · JPL
471030	2009 SF_{333}	—	September 25, 2009	Catalina	CSS	·	1.1 km	MPC · JPL
471031	2009 SD_{339}	—	September 21, 2009	Mount Lemmon	Mount Lemmon Survey	·	1.1 km	MPC · JPL
471032	2009 SP_{358}	—	September 18, 2009	Kitt Peak	Spacewatch	·	740 m	MPC · JPL
471033	2009 TJ_{5}	—	September 18, 2009	Kitt Peak	Spacewatch	·	950 m	MPC · JPL
471034	2009 TG_{8}	—	October 14, 2009	Mount Lemmon	Mount Lemmon Survey	AMO	500 m	MPC · JPL
471035	2009 TS_{12}	—	September 16, 2009	Kitt Peak	Spacewatch	·	960 m	MPC · JPL
471036	2009 TR_{14}	—	October 12, 2009	La Sagra	OAM	·	1.1 km	MPC · JPL
471037	2009 TO_{20}	—	October 11, 2009	La Sagra	OAM	·	1.4 km	MPC · JPL
471038	2009 TH_{22}	—	October 13, 2009	La Sagra	OAM	·	1.6 km	MPC · JPL
471039	2009 TY_{22}	—	September 22, 2009	Mount Lemmon	Mount Lemmon Survey	·	1.0 km	MPC · JPL
471040	2009 TR_{26}	—	October 14, 2009	La Sagra	OAM	·	1.1 km	MPC · JPL
471041	2009 TV_{33}	—	September 21, 2009	Catalina	CSS	·	930 m	MPC · JPL
471042	2009 UN_{16}	—	September 30, 2009	Mount Lemmon	Mount Lemmon Survey	·	1.2 km	MPC · JPL
471043	2009 UX_{25}	—	October 21, 2009	Catalina	CSS	·	1.0 km	MPC · JPL
471044	2009 UH_{39}	—	October 22, 2009	Mount Lemmon	Mount Lemmon Survey	·	1.0 km	MPC · JPL
471045	2009 UB_{47}	—	October 18, 2009	Mount Lemmon	Mount Lemmon Survey	MAS	680 m	MPC · JPL
471046	2009 UG_{47}	—	October 18, 2009	Mount Lemmon	Mount Lemmon Survey	NYS	960 m	MPC · JPL
471047	2009 UV_{50}	—	September 22, 2009	Mount Lemmon	Mount Lemmon Survey	·	1.2 km	MPC · JPL
471048	2009 UK_{72}	—	October 23, 2009	Mount Lemmon	Mount Lemmon Survey	MAS	740 m	MPC · JPL
471049	2009 UK_{83}	—	October 23, 2009	Mount Lemmon	Mount Lemmon Survey	·	1.2 km	MPC · JPL
471050	2009 UP_{92}	—	October 23, 2009	Mount Lemmon	Mount Lemmon Survey	·	1.0 km	MPC · JPL
471051	2009 UH_{94}	—	October 21, 2009	Catalina	CSS	MAS	730 m	MPC · JPL
471052	2009 UR_{101}	—	October 23, 2009	Mount Lemmon	Mount Lemmon Survey	·	1.6 km	MPC · JPL
471053	2009 UP_{106}	—	October 22, 2009	Mount Lemmon	Mount Lemmon Survey	·	1.1 km	MPC · JPL
471054	2009 UN_{109}	—	October 23, 2009	Kitt Peak	Spacewatch	MAS	590 m	MPC · JPL
471055	2009 UB_{111}	—	October 23, 2009	Kitt Peak	Spacewatch	·	1.1 km	MPC · JPL
471056	2009 UK_{127}	—	September 28, 2009	Mount Lemmon	Mount Lemmon Survey	·	3.3 km	MPC · JPL
471057	2009 UM_{134}	—	September 18, 2009	Mount Lemmon	Mount Lemmon Survey	·	850 m	MPC · JPL
471058	2009 UA_{138}	—	October 24, 2009	Catalina	CSS	H	470 m	MPC · JPL
471059	2009 UL_{143}	—	October 18, 2009	Mount Lemmon	Mount Lemmon Survey	L4	8.9 km	MPC · JPL
471060	2009 VF_{11}	—	October 23, 2009	Kitt Peak	Spacewatch	·	1.2 km	MPC · JPL
471061	2009 VD_{26}	—	November 6, 2009	Catalina	CSS	NYS	1.1 km	MPC · JPL
471062	2009 VY_{32}	—	October 18, 2001	Socorro	LINEAR	H	580 m	MPC · JPL
471063	2009 VD_{37}	—	October 24, 2009	Kitt Peak	Spacewatch	·	1.9 km	MPC · JPL
471064	2009 VQ_{51}	—	November 17, 2009	Kitt Peak	Spacewatch	H	520 m	MPC · JPL
471065	2009 VK_{59}	—	October 14, 2009	Mount Lemmon	Mount Lemmon Survey	NYS	980 m	MPC · JPL
471066	2009 VK_{62}	—	November 8, 2009	Kitt Peak	Spacewatch	MAS	560 m	MPC · JPL
471067	2009 VN_{63}	—	October 16, 2009	Mount Lemmon	Mount Lemmon Survey	·	1.0 km	MPC · JPL
471068	2009 VO_{92}	—	November 12, 2009	La Sagra	OAM	·	1.0 km	MPC · JPL
471069	2009 VU_{92}	—	October 29, 2009	Catalina	CSS	·	1.2 km	MPC · JPL
471070	2009 VX_{93}	—	November 15, 2009	Catalina	CSS	·	1.2 km	MPC · JPL
471071	2009 VO_{107}	—	November 23, 1998	Kitt Peak	Spacewatch	NYS	920 m	MPC · JPL
471072	2009 WU	—	November 16, 2009	BlackBird	Levin, K., Teamo, N.	·	1.1 km	MPC · JPL
471073	2009 WD_{29}	—	November 16, 2009	Kitt Peak	Spacewatch	V	590 m	MPC · JPL
471074	2009 WN_{44}	—	November 18, 2009	Kitt Peak	Spacewatch	·	1.0 km	MPC · JPL
471075	2009 WW_{54}	—	October 25, 2005	Kitt Peak	Spacewatch	·	1.3 km	MPC · JPL
471076	2009 WO_{88}	—	November 19, 2009	Kitt Peak	Spacewatch	·	1.1 km	MPC · JPL
471077	2009 WE_{94}	—	November 20, 2009	Kitt Peak	Spacewatch	·	970 m	MPC · JPL
471078	2009 WG_{152}	—	October 27, 2009	Mount Lemmon	Mount Lemmon Survey	L4	10 km	MPC · JPL
471079	2009 WN_{180}	—	March 25, 2007	Mount Lemmon	Mount Lemmon Survey	KON	2.1 km	MPC · JPL
471080	2009 WM_{183}	—	November 23, 2009	Kitt Peak	Spacewatch	·	1.2 km	MPC · JPL
471081	2009 WL_{198}	—	November 17, 2009	Catalina	CSS	·	1.7 km	MPC · JPL
471082	2009 WT_{263}	—	November 21, 2009	Mount Lemmon	Mount Lemmon Survey	·	2.2 km	MPC · JPL
471083	2009 XF_{2}	—	December 12, 2009	Socorro	LINEAR	APO	240 m	MPC · JPL
471084	2009 XY_{6}	—	December 11, 2009	Dauban	Kugel, F.	·	900 m	MPC · JPL
471085	2009 XW_{22}	—	December 15, 2009	Mount Lemmon	Mount Lemmon Survey	·	1.5 km	MPC · JPL
471086	2009 YT_{5}	—	December 17, 2009	Mount Lemmon	Mount Lemmon Survey	MAR	1.4 km	MPC · JPL
471087	2009 YJ_{24}	—	December 17, 2009	Mount Lemmon	Mount Lemmon Survey	ADE	2.1 km	MPC · JPL
471088	2010 AZ_{14}	—	November 23, 2009	Mount Lemmon	Mount Lemmon Survey	·	1.9 km	MPC · JPL
471089	2010 AA_{21}	—	December 19, 2009	Kitt Peak	Spacewatch	·	1.0 km	MPC · JPL
471090	2010 AX_{23}	—	January 6, 2010	Kitt Peak	Spacewatch	·	2.8 km	MPC · JPL
471091	2010 AT_{27}	—	January 7, 2010	Kitt Peak	Spacewatch	·	1.4 km	MPC · JPL
471092	2010 AA_{38}	—	October 26, 2009	Kitt Peak	Spacewatch	·	2.0 km	MPC · JPL
471093	2010 AC_{52}	—	December 27, 2009	Kitt Peak	Spacewatch	·	1.8 km	MPC · JPL
471094	2010 AV_{55}	—	January 8, 2010	Kitt Peak	Spacewatch	·	2.5 km	MPC · JPL
471095	2010 AE_{59}	—	December 15, 2009	Catalina	CSS	·	1.7 km	MPC · JPL
471096	2010 AR_{64}	—	January 6, 2010	Kitt Peak	Spacewatch	H	540 m	MPC · JPL
471097	2010 AQ_{68}	—	November 11, 2009	Mount Lemmon	Mount Lemmon Survey	·	1.4 km	MPC · JPL
471098	2010 AN_{81}	—	January 8, 2010	Mount Lemmon	Mount Lemmon Survey	·	2.6 km	MPC · JPL
471099	2010 AT_{99}	—	March 17, 2010	Mount Lemmon	Mount Lemmon Survey	·	4.0 km	MPC · JPL
471100	2010 AV_{99}	—	January 12, 2010	WISE	WISE	·	3.4 km	MPC · JPL

== 471101–471200 ==
back to top

Designation			Discovery			Properties		Ref
Permanent	Provisional	Named after	Date	Site	Discoverer(s)	Category	Diam.	Ref
471101	2010 AE_{106}	—	January 12, 2010	WISE	WISE	·	3.1 km	MPC · JPL
471102	2010 BO_{2}	—	January 16, 2010	Bisei SG Center	BATTeRS	·	2.4 km	MPC · JPL
471103	2010 BR_{14}	—	May 13, 2010	Mount Lemmon	Mount Lemmon Survey	·	2.7 km	MPC · JPL
471104	2010 BT_{40}	—	January 19, 2010	WISE	WISE	·	3.7 km	MPC · JPL
471105	2010 BN_{55}	—	June 16, 2005	Kitt Peak	Spacewatch	·	5.1 km	MPC · JPL
471106	2010 BY_{70}	—	May 13, 2010	Mount Lemmon	Mount Lemmon Survey	·	4.1 km	MPC · JPL
471107	2010 BX_{93}	—	January 27, 2010	WISE	WISE	·	4.0 km	MPC · JPL
471108	2010 CL_{1}	—	February 9, 2010	Catalina	CSS	AMO	470 m	MPC · JPL
471109 Vladobahýl	2010 CO_{12}	Vladobahýl	February 12, 2010	Mayhill	Kurti, S.	(5)	1.1 km	MPC · JPL
471110	2010 CT_{19}	—	December 17, 2009	Mount Lemmon	Mount Lemmon Survey	ADE	2.1 km	MPC · JPL
471111	2010 CJ_{20}	—	January 11, 2010	Kitt Peak	Spacewatch	·	2.0 km	MPC · JPL
471112	2010 CO_{33}	—	January 12, 2010	Kitt Peak	Spacewatch	·	1.7 km	MPC · JPL
471113	2010 CK_{41}	—	August 10, 2007	Kitt Peak	Spacewatch	·	3.9 km	MPC · JPL
471114	2010 CE_{61}	—	January 6, 2010	Kitt Peak	Spacewatch	·	2.0 km	MPC · JPL
471115	2010 CE_{63}	—	March 10, 2002	Kitt Peak	Spacewatch	·	2.0 km	MPC · JPL
471116	2010 CJ_{75}	—	January 11, 2010	Kitt Peak	Spacewatch	·	1.0 km	MPC · JPL
471117	2010 CC_{99}	—	February 14, 2010	Kitt Peak	Spacewatch	·	2.4 km	MPC · JPL
471118	2010 CW_{114}	—	September 23, 2008	Mount Lemmon	Mount Lemmon Survey	·	2.0 km	MPC · JPL
471119	2010 CD_{125}	—	February 15, 2010	Kitt Peak	Spacewatch	H	520 m	MPC · JPL
471120	2010 CX_{137}	—	February 9, 2010	Kitt Peak	Spacewatch	·	2.1 km	MPC · JPL
471121	2010 CQ_{160}	—	February 6, 2010	Mount Lemmon	Mount Lemmon Survey	·	1.9 km	MPC · JPL
471122	2010 CJ_{184}	—	February 15, 2010	Catalina	CSS	·	1.5 km	MPC · JPL
471123	2010 CO_{213}	—	February 6, 2010	WISE	WISE	·	2.3 km	MPC · JPL
471124	2010 CU_{225}	—	December 5, 2007	Mount Lemmon	Mount Lemmon Survey	·	4.9 km	MPC · JPL
471125	2010 CG_{248}	—	January 15, 2010	Mount Lemmon	Mount Lemmon Survey	·	1.4 km	MPC · JPL
471126	2010 DL_{5}	—	January 7, 2010	Kitt Peak	Spacewatch	·	2.4 km	MPC · JPL
471127	2010 DS_{11}	—	February 13, 2010	Mount Lemmon	Mount Lemmon Survey	·	1.3 km	MPC · JPL
471128	2010 DN_{13}	—	February 16, 2010	WISE	WISE	·	4.7 km	MPC · JPL
471129	2010 DQ_{40}	—	February 16, 2010	Kitt Peak	Spacewatch	·	2.2 km	MPC · JPL
471130	2010 DO_{41}	—	February 17, 2010	Mount Lemmon	Mount Lemmon Survey	EOS	1.5 km	MPC · JPL
471131	2010 DZ_{50}	—	February 21, 2010	WISE	WISE	·	2.9 km	MPC · JPL
471132	2010 DD_{79}	—	February 16, 2010	Kitt Peak	Spacewatch	·	2.1 km	MPC · JPL
471133	2010 EC_{9}	—	March 4, 2010	WISE	WISE	·	3.8 km	MPC · JPL
471134	2010 ET_{21}	—	March 5, 2010	Catalina	CSS	H	590 m	MPC · JPL
471135	2010 ER_{25}	—	October 23, 2006	Kitt Peak	Spacewatch	·	3.7 km	MPC · JPL
471136	2010 EO_{65}	—	March 9, 2010	La Silla	D. L. Rabinowitz, S. Tourtellotte	centaur	60 km	MPC · JPL
471137	2010 ET_{65}	—	March 13, 2010	La Silla	D. L. Rabinowitz, S. Tourtellotte	SDO	339 km	MPC · JPL
471138	2010 EY_{69}	—	March 13, 2010	Siding Spring	SSS	·	3.0 km	MPC · JPL
471139	2010 EK_{100}	—	February 14, 2010	Kitt Peak	Spacewatch	H	460 m	MPC · JPL
471140	2010 EX_{104}	—	February 16, 2010	Siding Spring	SSS	·	2.0 km	MPC · JPL
471141	2010 ED_{111}	—	March 13, 2010	Kitt Peak	Spacewatch	·	1.8 km	MPC · JPL
471142	2010 ET_{123}	—	February 16, 2010	Kitt Peak	Spacewatch	·	1.6 km	MPC · JPL
471143 Dziewanna	2010 EK_{139}	Dziewanna	March 13, 2010	Las Campanas	Udalski, A., Kubiak, S. S. Sheppard, M., Trujillo, C. A.	res · 2:7	470 km	MPC · JPL
471144	2010 FY	—	May 20, 2006	Mount Lemmon	Mount Lemmon Survey	AST	1.7 km	MPC · JPL
471145	2010 FD_{1}	—	February 19, 2010	Catalina	CSS	·	2.2 km	MPC · JPL
471146	2010 FY_{2}	—	March 16, 2010	Mount Lemmon	Mount Lemmon Survey	·	2.1 km	MPC · JPL
471147	2010 FA_{12}	—	March 16, 2010	Kitt Peak	Spacewatch	·	1.3 km	MPC · JPL
471148	2010 FL_{26}	—	February 16, 2010	Mount Lemmon	Mount Lemmon Survey	·	2.8 km	MPC · JPL
471149	2010 FB_{49}	—	March 17, 2010	La Silla	D. L. Rabinowitz, S. Tourtellotte	centaur	183 km	MPC · JPL
471150	2010 FC_{49}	—	March 18, 2010	La Silla	D. L. Rabinowitz, S. Tourtellotte	other TNO	249 km	MPC · JPL
471151	2010 FD_{49}	—	March 19, 2010	La Silla	D. L. Rabinowitz, S. Tourtellotte	res · 2:5	196 km	MPC · JPL
471152	2010 FE_{49}	—	March 19, 2010	La Silla	D. L. Rabinowitz, S. Tourtellotte	SDO	189 km	MPC · JPL
471153	2010 FV_{56}	—	March 16, 2010	Kitt Peak	Spacewatch	·	2.0 km	MPC · JPL
471154	2010 FQ_{88}	—	March 18, 2010	Kitt Peak	Spacewatch	·	2.9 km	MPC · JPL
471155	2010 GF_{65}	—	April 14, 2010	La Silla	D. L. Rabinowitz, S. Tourtellotte	centaur	193 km	MPC · JPL
471156	2010 GZ_{73}	—	April 14, 2010	WISE	WISE	T_{j} (2.98)	5.2 km	MPC · JPL
471157	2010 GS_{97}	—	April 8, 2010	Kitt Peak	Spacewatch	·	1.8 km	MPC · JPL
471158	2010 GQ_{110}	—	April 9, 2010	Mount Lemmon	Mount Lemmon Survey	·	2.2 km	MPC · JPL
471159	2010 GK_{153}	—	April 15, 2010	WISE	WISE	·	5.1 km	MPC · JPL
471160	2010 GK_{173}	—	October 7, 2008	Mount Lemmon	Mount Lemmon Survey	·	1.6 km	MPC · JPL
471161	2010 HM_{13}	—	April 18, 2010	WISE	WISE	·	4.1 km	MPC · JPL
471162	2010 HO_{37}	—	June 1, 2005	Mount Lemmon	Mount Lemmon Survey	T_{j} (2.97)	2.4 km	MPC · JPL
471163	2010 HD_{57}	—	April 25, 2010	WISE	WISE	·	4.2 km	MPC · JPL
471164	2010 HZ_{57}	—	April 25, 2010	WISE	WISE	·	4.8 km	MPC · JPL
471165	2010 HE_{79}	—	May 7, 2002	Palomar	S. S. Sheppard, R. Poleski, A. Udalski, C. A. Trujillo	other TNO · moon	324 km	MPC · JPL
471166	2010 HK_{107}	—	April 26, 2010	Mount Lemmon	Mount Lemmon Survey	EOS	1.7 km	MPC · JPL
471167	2010 HF_{109}	—	April 25, 2010	Mount Lemmon	Mount Lemmon Survey	·	2.7 km	MPC · JPL
471168	2010 JU_{3}	—	May 1, 2010	WISE	WISE	·	5.4 km	MPC · JPL
471169	2010 JZ_{22}	—	May 4, 2010	WISE	WISE	·	4.6 km	MPC · JPL
471170	2010 JE_{45}	—	September 18, 2006	Kitt Peak	Spacewatch	·	1.9 km	MPC · JPL
471171	2010 JT_{47}	—	May 3, 2010	Kitt Peak	Spacewatch	·	2.8 km	MPC · JPL
471172	2010 JC_{80}	—	May 12, 2010	La Silla	D. L. Rabinowitz, S. Tourtellotte	res · 2:5	224 km	MPC · JPL
471173	2010 JR_{84}	—	May 5, 2010	Catalina	CSS	·	2.8 km	MPC · JPL
471174	2010 JZ_{113}	—	February 17, 2004	Kitt Peak	Spacewatch	·	2.8 km	MPC · JPL
471175	2010 JY_{131}	—	May 13, 2010	WISE	WISE	·	3.6 km	MPC · JPL
471176	2010 JW_{151}	—	April 20, 2010	Kitt Peak	Spacewatch	·	2.8 km	MPC · JPL
471177	2010 JP_{155}	—	May 9, 2010	Mount Lemmon	Mount Lemmon Survey	·	1.7 km	MPC · JPL
471178	2010 JW_{157}	—	May 13, 2010	Kitt Peak	Spacewatch	EOS	1.8 km	MPC · JPL
471179	2010 KW_{20}	—	May 17, 2010	WISE	WISE	T_{j} (2.98) · CYB	2.9 km	MPC · JPL
471180	2010 KF_{23}	—	May 18, 2010	WISE	WISE	·	3.6 km	MPC · JPL
471181	2010 KM_{35}	—	May 19, 2010	WISE	WISE	T_{j} (2.99)	3.9 km	MPC · JPL
471182	2010 LD_{33}	—	September 23, 2004	Socorro	LINEAR	CYB	2.9 km	MPC · JPL
471183	2010 LE_{61}	—	May 21, 2010	Nogales	M. Schwartz, P. R. Holvorcem	·	2.3 km	MPC · JPL
471184	2010 LT_{62}	—	July 3, 2005	Mount Lemmon	Mount Lemmon Survey	·	2.4 km	MPC · JPL
471185	2010 LH_{68}	—	February 25, 2007	Catalina	CSS	H	830 m	MPC · JPL
471186	2010 MH_{80}	—	January 1, 2009	Mount Lemmon	Mount Lemmon Survey	·	3.1 km	MPC · JPL
471187	2010 ND_{5}	—	March 19, 2009	Kitt Peak	Spacewatch	THM	2.6 km	MPC · JPL
471188	2010 NT_{13}	—	July 5, 2010	WISE	WISE	·	2.8 km	MPC · JPL
471189	2010 NZ_{13}	—	July 5, 2010	WISE	WISE	·	3.9 km	MPC · JPL
471190	2010 NQ_{56}	—	July 10, 2010	WISE	WISE	SYL · CYB	5.2 km	MPC · JPL
471191	2010 NJ_{83}	—	July 1, 2010	WISE	WISE	CYB	4.3 km	MPC · JPL
471192	2010 ND_{118}	—	May 24, 2010	Mount Lemmon	Mount Lemmon Survey	·	3.7 km	MPC · JPL
471193	2010 OC_{74}	—	July 25, 2010	WISE	WISE	·	4.0 km	MPC · JPL
471194	2010 OM_{107}	—	April 5, 2010	Catalina	CSS	·	4.0 km	MPC · JPL
471195	2010 PS_{46}	—	March 20, 2007	Kitt Peak	Spacewatch	CYB	4.2 km	MPC · JPL
471196	2010 PK_{66}	—	August 14, 2010	La Silla	D. L. Rabinowitz, M. E. Schwamb, S. Tourtellotte	cubewano (hot)	357 km	MPC · JPL
471197	2010 RT_{59}	—	September 15, 2007	Mount Lemmon	Mount Lemmon Survey	·	520 m	MPC · JPL
471198	2010 SM	—	September 4, 2010	Kitt Peak	Spacewatch	·	560 m	MPC · JPL
471199	2010 SC_{19}	—	September 15, 2007	Mount Lemmon	Mount Lemmon Survey	·	930 m	MPC · JPL
471200	2010 SB_{23}	—	September 28, 1997	Kitt Peak	Spacewatch	·	580 m	MPC · JPL

== 471201–471300 ==
back to top

Designation			Discovery			Properties		Ref
Permanent	Provisional	Named after	Date	Site	Discoverer(s)	Category	Diam.	Ref
471201	2010 TF_{7}	—	September 11, 2010	Kitt Peak	Spacewatch	VER	2.6 km	MPC · JPL
471202	2010 TS_{13}	—	September 14, 2010	Kitt Peak	Spacewatch	EOS	1.6 km	MPC · JPL
471203	2010 TJ_{75}	—	September 10, 2010	Kitt Peak	Spacewatch	·	590 m	MPC · JPL
471204	2010 TN_{144}	—	September 16, 2010	Mount Lemmon	Mount Lemmon Survey	·	750 m	MPC · JPL
471205	2010 TX_{161}	—	December 14, 2007	Kitt Peak	Spacewatch	·	620 m	MPC · JPL
471206	2010 UT_{9}	—	October 17, 2010	Mount Lemmon	Mount Lemmon Survey	·	550 m	MPC · JPL
471207	2010 UP_{26}	—	January 15, 2008	Kitt Peak	Spacewatch	·	680 m	MPC · JPL
471208	2010 UU_{56}	—	October 29, 2010	Kitt Peak	Spacewatch	·	800 m	MPC · JPL
471209	2010 UK_{106}	—	November 14, 1999	Socorro	LINEAR	PHO	960 m	MPC · JPL
471210	2010 VW_{11}	—	November 3, 2010	La Silla	D. L. Rabinowitz, M. E. Schwamb, S. Tourtellotte	SDO	320 km	MPC · JPL
471211	2010 VE_{13}	—	November 1, 2010	Kitt Peak	Spacewatch	·	2.5 km	MPC · JPL
471212	2010 VE_{37}	—	November 4, 2010	Socorro	LINEAR	·	690 m	MPC · JPL
471213	2010 VQ_{88}	—	December 16, 2007	Mount Lemmon	Mount Lemmon Survey	·	500 m	MPC · JPL
471214	2010 VT_{112}	—	November 7, 2010	Kitt Peak	Spacewatch	L4	9.6 km	MPC · JPL
471215	2010 VM_{115}	—	November 16, 2009	Mount Lemmon	Mount Lemmon Survey	L4	8.0 km	MPC · JPL
471216	2010 VT_{162}	—	November 10, 2010	Kitt Peak	Spacewatch	·	720 m	MPC · JPL
471217	2010 VJ_{178}	—	May 20, 2006	Kitt Peak	Spacewatch	·	550 m	MPC · JPL
471218	2010 VX_{205}	—	October 31, 2010	Kitt Peak	Spacewatch	·	660 m	MPC · JPL
471219	2010 WS_{9}	—	November 8, 2010	Kitt Peak	Spacewatch	·	740 m	MPC · JPL
471220	2010 WX_{27}	—	August 18, 2003	Campo Imperatore	CINEOS	·	590 m	MPC · JPL
471221	2010 WH_{29}	—	October 29, 2010	Mount Lemmon	Mount Lemmon Survey	·	810 m	MPC · JPL
471222	2010 XN_{44}	—	March 30, 2008	Catalina	CSS	·	1.3 km	MPC · JPL
471223	2010 XJ_{46}	—	July 3, 2005	Mount Lemmon	Mount Lemmon Survey	PHO	1.2 km	MPC · JPL
471224	2010 XO_{64}	—	October 31, 2010	Kitt Peak	Spacewatch	·	1.0 km	MPC · JPL
471225	2011 AZ_{8}	—	December 14, 2010	Mount Lemmon	Mount Lemmon Survey	·	1.0 km	MPC · JPL
471226	2011 AT_{12}	—	December 11, 2010	Mount Lemmon	Mount Lemmon Survey	·	1.3 km	MPC · JPL
471227	2011 AE_{14}	—	January 8, 2011	Mount Lemmon	Mount Lemmon Survey	NYS	1.2 km	MPC · JPL
471228	2011 AG_{16}	—	January 4, 2011	Catalina	CSS	T_{j} (2.98)	3.5 km	MPC · JPL
471229	2011 AX_{24}	—	October 12, 2010	Kitt Peak	Spacewatch	V	750 m	MPC · JPL
471230	2011 AK_{31}	—	September 17, 2009	Catalina	CSS	V	730 m	MPC · JPL
471231	2011 AV_{36}	—	January 12, 2011	Mount Lemmon	Mount Lemmon Survey	·	1.7 km	MPC · JPL
471232	2011 AS_{44}	—	October 21, 2006	Kitt Peak	Spacewatch	·	730 m	MPC · JPL
471233	2011 AF_{52}	—	January 14, 2011	Sandlot	G. Hug	T_{j} (2.99)	3.7 km	MPC · JPL
471234	2011 AO_{56}	—	January 10, 2011	Kitt Peak	Spacewatch	·	3.2 km	MPC · JPL
471235	2011 AQ_{56}	—	December 8, 2010	Mount Lemmon	Mount Lemmon Survey	·	690 m	MPC · JPL
471236	2011 AV_{70}	—	December 6, 2010	Mount Lemmon	Mount Lemmon Survey	·	1.3 km	MPC · JPL
471237	2011 AC_{72}	—	January 3, 2011	Mount Lemmon	Mount Lemmon Survey	centaur	40 km	MPC · JPL
471238	2011 BF	—	January 16, 2011	Mount Lemmon	Mount Lemmon Survey	·	710 m	MPC · JPL
471239	2011 BN_{15}	—	December 2, 2010	Kitt Peak	Spacewatch	·	2.6 km	MPC · JPL
471240	2011 BT_{15}	—	January 24, 2011	Haleakala	Pan-STARRS 1	APO · PHA · fast	160 m	MPC · JPL
471241	2011 BX_{18}	—	January 26, 2011	Mount Lemmon	Mount Lemmon Survey	T_{j} (2.79) · APO +1km · PHA	1.5 km	MPC · JPL
471242	2011 BT_{23}	—	January 14, 2011	Kitt Peak	Spacewatch	·	620 m	MPC · JPL
471243	2011 BU_{27}	—	January 25, 2011	Kitt Peak	Spacewatch	·	930 m	MPC · JPL
471244	2011 BU_{38}	—	January 28, 2011	Mount Lemmon	Mount Lemmon Survey	EUN	1.0 km	MPC · JPL
471245	2011 BO_{60}	—	January 25, 2011	Mount Lemmon	Mount Lemmon Survey	·	1.3 km	MPC · JPL
471246	2011 BC_{61}	—	January 16, 2011	Mount Lemmon	Mount Lemmon Survey	·	1.3 km	MPC · JPL
471247	2011 BT_{74}	—	November 15, 2006	Catalina	CSS	(2076)	840 m	MPC · JPL
471248	2011 BG_{89}	—	December 29, 2003	Kitt Peak	Spacewatch	·	790 m	MPC · JPL
471249	2011 BN_{90}	—	January 13, 2011	Kitt Peak	Spacewatch	·	780 m	MPC · JPL
471250	2011 BG_{93}	—	January 28, 2011	Mount Lemmon	Mount Lemmon Survey	NYS	990 m	MPC · JPL
471251	2011 BG_{94}	—	October 21, 2006	Kitt Peak	Spacewatch	·	620 m	MPC · JPL
471252	2011 BD_{138}	—	September 22, 2009	Kitt Peak	Spacewatch	·	1 km	MPC · JPL
471253	2011 BB_{149}	—	April 1, 2008	Kitt Peak	Spacewatch	·	870 m	MPC · JPL
471254	2011 CM	—	January 28, 2011	Catalina	CSS	·	1.3 km	MPC · JPL
471255	2011 CZ_{10}	—	August 6, 2005	Palomar	NEAT	·	1.4 km	MPC · JPL
471256	2011 CU_{16}	—	January 24, 2011	Mount Lemmon	Mount Lemmon Survey	·	1.0 km	MPC · JPL
471257	2011 CW_{49}	—	January 28, 2011	Mount Lemmon	Mount Lemmon Survey	·	1.5 km	MPC · JPL
471258	2011 CE_{63}	—	January 12, 2011	Kitt Peak	Spacewatch	·	750 m	MPC · JPL
471259	2011 CX_{66}	—	January 12, 2011	Mount Lemmon	Mount Lemmon Survey	NYS	1.1 km	MPC · JPL
471260	2011 CR_{67}	—	January 13, 2011	Kitt Peak	Spacewatch	·	1.6 km	MPC · JPL
471261	2011 CV_{86}	—	January 29, 2011	Kitt Peak	Spacewatch	·	1.3 km	MPC · JPL
471262	2011 DT_{5}	—	January 30, 2011	Kitt Peak	Spacewatch	MAS	620 m	MPC · JPL
471263	2011 DB_{14}	—	May 8, 2008	Kitt Peak	Spacewatch	·	1.1 km	MPC · JPL
471264	2011 DY_{39}	—	February 25, 2011	Mount Lemmon	Mount Lemmon Survey	·	1.2 km	MPC · JPL
471265	2011 DN_{42}	—	February 25, 2011	Mount Lemmon	Mount Lemmon Survey	·	1.6 km	MPC · JPL
471266	2011 EV_{38}	—	March 2, 2011	Kitt Peak	Spacewatch	·	1.1 km	MPC · JPL
471267	2011 EO_{43}	—	March 15, 2007	Mount Lemmon	Mount Lemmon Survey	·	1.1 km	MPC · JPL
471268	2011 EP_{71}	—	March 2, 2011	Kitt Peak	Spacewatch	·	1.0 km	MPC · JPL
471269	2011 EG_{86}	—	June 9, 2007	Kitt Peak	Spacewatch	·	1.4 km	MPC · JPL
471270	2011 FU_{3}	—	March 24, 2011	Catalina	CSS	·	1.7 km	MPC · JPL
471271	2011 FZ_{6}	—	July 4, 1995	Kitt Peak	Spacewatch	·	1.9 km	MPC · JPL
471272	2011 FY_{9}	—	March 27, 2011	La Silla	D. L. Rabinowitz	centaur	90 km	MPC · JPL
471273	2011 FU_{10}	—	March 13, 2007	Mount Lemmon	Mount Lemmon Survey	·	1.0 km	MPC · JPL
471274	2011 FG_{17}	—	March 15, 2004	Kitt Peak	Spacewatch	PHO	1.1 km	MPC · JPL
471275	2011 FX_{30}	—	March 27, 2011	Mount Lemmon	Mount Lemmon Survey	·	1.4 km	MPC · JPL
471276	2011 FT_{33}	—	March 28, 2011	Mount Lemmon	Mount Lemmon Survey	·	1.6 km	MPC · JPL
471277	2011 FX_{33}	—	March 28, 2011	Mount Lemmon	Mount Lemmon Survey	·	1.5 km	MPC · JPL
471278	2011 FC_{58}	—	February 25, 2011	Mount Lemmon	Mount Lemmon Survey	·	2.0 km	MPC · JPL
471279	2011 FD_{65}	—	March 30, 2011	Mount Lemmon	Mount Lemmon Survey	MAR	1.2 km	MPC · JPL
471280	2011 FU_{71}	—	September 11, 2007	Kitt Peak	Spacewatch	·	2.5 km	MPC · JPL
471281	2011 FT_{97}	—	March 21, 2010	WISE	WISE	·	2.3 km	MPC · JPL
471282	2011 FG_{98}	—	March 11, 2011	Kitt Peak	Spacewatch	·	1.2 km	MPC · JPL
471283	2011 FH_{105}	—	February 25, 2011	Kitt Peak	Spacewatch	·	1.1 km	MPC · JPL
471284	2011 GX_{2}	—	March 14, 2011	Catalina	CSS	·	1.7 km	MPC · JPL
471285	2011 GW_{4}	—	May 14, 2007	Catalina	CSS	·	1.5 km	MPC · JPL
471286	2011 GU_{7}	—	March 11, 2011	Mount Lemmon	Mount Lemmon Survey	·	1.0 km	MPC · JPL
471287	2011 GA_{26}	—	April 19, 2007	Mount Lemmon	Mount Lemmon Survey	·	1.1 km	MPC · JPL
471288	2011 GM_{27}	—	April 3, 2011	La Silla	La Silla	cubewano (hot)	421 km	MPC · JPL
471289	2011 GJ_{34}	—	September 3, 2008	Kitt Peak	Spacewatch	·	1.9 km	MPC · JPL
471290	2011 GX_{34}	—	March 11, 2011	Mount Lemmon	Mount Lemmon Survey	·	1.3 km	MPC · JPL
471291	2011 GV_{60}	—	March 26, 2011	Mount Lemmon	Mount Lemmon Survey	·	1.4 km	MPC · JPL
471292	2011 GJ_{64}	—	April 5, 2011	Catalina	CSS	·	2.3 km	MPC · JPL
471293	2011 GW_{64}	—	March 26, 2011	Mount Lemmon	Mount Lemmon Survey	·	1.3 km	MPC · JPL
471294	2011 GK_{70}	—	March 28, 2011	Kitt Peak	Spacewatch	·	1.9 km	MPC · JPL
471295	2011 GK_{74}	—	October 6, 2008	Kitt Peak	Spacewatch	AGN	1.2 km	MPC · JPL
471296	2011 GP_{83}	—	May 13, 2007	Mount Lemmon	Mount Lemmon Survey	·	1.3 km	MPC · JPL
471297	2011 GM_{85}	—	September 2, 2008	Kitt Peak	Spacewatch	·	1.1 km	MPC · JPL
471298	2011 HD_{3}	—	March 26, 2011	Mount Lemmon	Mount Lemmon Survey	·	1.4 km	MPC · JPL
471299	2011 HM_{11}	—	April 22, 2011	Kitt Peak	Spacewatch	·	1.1 km	MPC · JPL
471300	2011 HZ_{12}	—	April 23, 2011	Kitt Peak	Spacewatch	MAR	1.2 km	MPC · JPL

== 471301–471400 ==
back to top

Designation			Discovery			Properties		Ref
Permanent	Provisional	Named after	Date	Site	Discoverer(s)	Category	Diam.	Ref
471301 Robertajmolson	2011 HS_{20}	Robertajmolson	January 30, 2006	Kitt Peak	Spacewatch	·	1.5 km	MPC · JPL
471302	2011 HS_{30}	—	December 24, 2005	Kitt Peak	Spacewatch	·	1.4 km	MPC · JPL
471303	2011 HS_{36}	—	April 27, 2011	Kitt Peak	Spacewatch	·	1.1 km	MPC · JPL
471304	2011 HZ_{53}	—	March 12, 2011	Mount Lemmon	Mount Lemmon Survey	·	1.4 km	MPC · JPL
471305	2011 HL_{56}	—	February 11, 2011	Mount Lemmon	Mount Lemmon Survey	·	1.2 km	MPC · JPL
471306	2011 HE_{67}	—	April 23, 2011	Kitt Peak	Spacewatch	·	1.4 km	MPC · JPL
471307	2011 HM_{72}	—	April 22, 2011	Kitt Peak	Spacewatch	·	1.7 km	MPC · JPL
471308	2011 HK_{73}	—	April 2, 2011	Kitt Peak	Spacewatch	·	1.6 km	MPC · JPL
471309	2011 HO_{79}	—	March 24, 2003	Kitt Peak	Spacewatch	·	1.6 km	MPC · JPL
471310	2011 HZ_{82}	—	March 27, 2011	Mount Lemmon	Mount Lemmon Survey	·	1.9 km	MPC · JPL
471311	2011 HA_{85}	—	September 10, 2007	Kitt Peak	Spacewatch	·	2.2 km	MPC · JPL
471312	2011 HA_{88}	—	January 31, 2006	Kitt Peak	Spacewatch	·	1.3 km	MPC · JPL
471313	2011 HU_{88}	—	January 5, 2006	Kitt Peak	Spacewatch	·	1.1 km	MPC · JPL
471314	2011 HR_{90}	—	April 26, 2007	Mount Lemmon	Mount Lemmon Survey	·	1.0 km	MPC · JPL
471315	2011 JL_{9}	—	May 5, 2011	Kitt Peak	Spacewatch	·	1.9 km	MPC · JPL
471316	2011 JQ_{20}	—	May 3, 2011	Mount Lemmon	Mount Lemmon Survey	·	1.4 km	MPC · JPL
471317	2011 JJ_{28}	—	November 1, 2008	Mount Lemmon	Mount Lemmon Survey	·	1.8 km	MPC · JPL
471318	2011 JF_{31}	—	May 3, 2011	La Silla	La Silla	cubewano (hot)	404 km	MPC · JPL
471319	2011 KS_{1}	—	February 15, 2010	Kitt Peak	Spacewatch	(18466)	2.3 km	MPC · JPL
471320	2011 KQ_{2}	—	November 19, 2008	Mount Lemmon	Mount Lemmon Survey	·	1.9 km	MPC · JPL
471321	2011 KG_{6}	—	April 2, 2010	WISE	WISE	·	2.0 km	MPC · JPL
471322	2011 KU_{6}	—	October 27, 2008	Mount Lemmon	Mount Lemmon Survey	·	1.9 km	MPC · JPL
471323	2011 KW_{15}	—	May 26, 2011	Siding Spring	SSS	APO · PHA	470 m	MPC · JPL
471324	2011 KE_{16}	—	June 21, 2007	Kitt Peak	Spacewatch	EUN	1.1 km	MPC · JPL
471325 Taowu	2011 KT_{19}	Taowu	May 31, 2011	Mount Lemmon	Mount Lemmon Survey	centaur	179 km	MPC · JPL
471326	2011 KJ_{21}	—	May 1, 2010	WISE	WISE	MAR	2.5 km	MPC · JPL
471327	2011 KJ_{23}	—	December 18, 2009	Mount Lemmon	Mount Lemmon Survey	EUN	1.1 km	MPC · JPL
471328	2011 KH_{34}	—	April 20, 2006	Kitt Peak	Spacewatch	·	1.6 km	MPC · JPL
471329	2011 KG_{36}	—	January 18, 1998	Kitt Peak	Spacewatch	EUN	1.1 km	MPC · JPL
471330	2011 KH_{45}	—	September 14, 2004	Palomar	NEAT	·	1.5 km	MPC · JPL
471331	2011 LR_{7}	—	April 24, 2011	Kitt Peak	Spacewatch	·	1.9 km	MPC · JPL
471332	2011 LD_{10}	—	April 26, 2011	Mount Lemmon	Mount Lemmon Survey	·	2.3 km	MPC · JPL
471333	2011 LJ_{15}	—	September 13, 1998	Kitt Peak	Spacewatch	AEO	1.0 km	MPC · JPL
471334	2011 LE_{27}	—	June 12, 2011	Mount Lemmon	Mount Lemmon Survey	H	480 m	MPC · JPL
471335	2011 OD_{16}	—	July 25, 2011	Haleakala	Pan-STARRS 1	centaur	90 km	MPC · JPL
471336	2011 OZ_{18}	—	December 15, 1999	Kitt Peak	Spacewatch	H	490 m	MPC · JPL
471337	2011 OQ_{21}	—	April 1, 2005	Kitt Peak	Spacewatch	·	1.9 km	MPC · JPL
471338	2011 OY_{33}	—	June 4, 2011	Mount Lemmon	Mount Lemmon Survey	·	2.5 km	MPC · JPL
471339	2011 ON_{45}	—	July 27, 2011	Haleakala	Pan-STARRS 1	centaur	30 km	MPC · JPL
471340	2011 OK_{48}	—	January 3, 2009	Kitt Peak	Spacewatch	·	1.9 km	MPC · JPL
471341	2011 PO_{15}	—	October 4, 2006	Mount Lemmon	Mount Lemmon Survey	·	2.7 km	MPC · JPL
471342	2011 QQ	—	September 23, 2006	Kitt Peak	Spacewatch	EOS	1.6 km	MPC · JPL
471343	2011 QD_{10}	—	August 21, 2006	Kitt Peak	Spacewatch	EOS	1.4 km	MPC · JPL
471344	2011 QE_{22}	—	March 31, 2004	Kitt Peak	Spacewatch	·	2.7 km	MPC · JPL
471345	2011 QG_{24}	—	September 25, 2006	Kitt Peak	Spacewatch	·	1.8 km	MPC · JPL
471346	2011 QP_{44}	—	June 24, 2010	WISE	WISE	·	2.9 km	MPC · JPL
471347	2011 QU_{47}	—	June 9, 2011	Mount Lemmon	Mount Lemmon Survey	H	660 m	MPC · JPL
471348	2011 QU_{54}	—	September 19, 2006	Catalina	CSS	·	1.9 km	MPC · JPL
471349	2011 QO_{57}	—	August 29, 2011	Siding Spring	SSS	·	3.7 km	MPC · JPL
471350	2011 QY_{63}	—	September 14, 2005	Kitt Peak	Spacewatch	CYB	2.9 km	MPC · JPL
471351	2011 QB_{65}	—	October 16, 2006	Catalina	CSS	·	1.7 km	MPC · JPL
471352	2011 QH_{78}	—	September 16, 2006	Catalina	CSS	·	1.6 km	MPC · JPL
471353	2011 QE_{79}	—	June 12, 2011	Mount Lemmon	Mount Lemmon Survey	H	530 m	MPC · JPL
471354	2011 QO_{88}	—	February 8, 2008	Kitt Peak	Spacewatch	·	2.2 km	MPC · JPL
471355	2011 QN_{91}	—	August 26, 2011	Kitt Peak	Spacewatch	·	2.5 km	MPC · JPL
471356	2011 QT_{94}	—	October 23, 1995	Kitt Peak	Spacewatch	·	1.8 km	MPC · JPL
471357	2011 RP_{8}	—	December 18, 2007	Mount Lemmon	Mount Lemmon Survey	EOS	1.6 km	MPC · JPL
471358	2011 RZ_{11}	—	September 7, 2000	Kitt Peak	Spacewatch	·	3.2 km	MPC · JPL
471359	2011 RE_{14}	—	September 4, 2011	Kitt Peak	Spacewatch	·	2.6 km	MPC · JPL
471360	2011 SL_{21}	—	August 31, 2000	Socorro	LINEAR	·	2.4 km	MPC · JPL
471361	2011 SL_{32}	—	November 2, 2006	Mount Lemmon	Mount Lemmon Survey	·	2.2 km	MPC · JPL
471362	2011 SD_{35}	—	October 19, 2006	Mount Lemmon	Mount Lemmon Survey	·	2.2 km	MPC · JPL
471363	2011 SQ_{38}	—	January 14, 2008	Kitt Peak	Spacewatch	·	2.9 km	MPC · JPL
471364	2011 ST_{41}	—	February 16, 2010	WISE	WISE	·	3.1 km	MPC · JPL
471365	2011 SC_{42}	—	December 20, 2007	Mount Lemmon	Mount Lemmon Survey	(31811)	2.5 km	MPC · JPL
471366	2011 SX_{44}	—	March 11, 2008	Mount Lemmon	Mount Lemmon Survey	·	2.9 km	MPC · JPL
471367	2011 SD_{60}	—	January 11, 2008	Kitt Peak	Spacewatch	·	2.9 km	MPC · JPL
471368	2011 SE_{62}	—	October 4, 2006	Mount Lemmon	Mount Lemmon Survey	·	4.1 km	MPC · JPL
471369	2011 SF_{62}	—	January 10, 2008	Kitt Peak	Spacewatch	·	2.4 km	MPC · JPL
471370	2011 SK_{67}	—	October 16, 2006	Catalina	CSS	H	480 m	MPC · JPL
471371	2011 ST_{72}	—	September 4, 2000	Kitt Peak	Spacewatch	·	2.0 km	MPC · JPL
471372	2011 SH_{74}	—	January 11, 2008	Catalina	CSS	·	3.0 km	MPC · JPL
471373	2011 SF_{75}	—	August 31, 2005	Kitt Peak	Spacewatch	·	2.9 km	MPC · JPL
471374	2011 SN_{84}	—	April 12, 2010	WISE	WISE	·	4.0 km	MPC · JPL
471375	2011 SP_{87}	—	September 22, 2011	Kitt Peak	Spacewatch	·	2.8 km	MPC · JPL
471376	2011 SR_{89}	—	September 22, 2011	Kitt Peak	Spacewatch	·	2.7 km	MPC · JPL
471377	2011 SF_{99}	—	April 8, 2010	WISE	WISE	·	4.7 km	MPC · JPL
471378	2011 SU_{99}	—	October 24, 1995	Kitt Peak	Spacewatch	·	2.6 km	MPC · JPL
471379	2011 SM_{104}	—	September 23, 2011	Kitt Peak	Spacewatch	·	1.8 km	MPC · JPL
471380	2011 SG_{109}	—	February 9, 2010	WISE	WISE	LIX	3.5 km	MPC · JPL
471381	2011 SC_{116}	—	October 28, 2006	Catalina	CSS	·	2.9 km	MPC · JPL
471382	2011 SW_{120}	—	December 3, 2007	Kitt Peak	Spacewatch	KOR	1.3 km	MPC · JPL
471383	2011 SX_{121}	—	September 18, 2011	Mount Lemmon	Mount Lemmon Survey	·	2.5 km	MPC · JPL
471384	2011 SC_{122}	—	June 28, 2011	Mount Lemmon	Mount Lemmon Survey	LIX	3.4 km	MPC · JPL
471385	2011 SR_{122}	—	November 25, 2006	Kitt Peak	Spacewatch	THM	2.3 km	MPC · JPL
471386	2011 SG_{125}	—	August 30, 2005	Kitt Peak	Spacewatch	THM	2.2 km	MPC · JPL
471387	2011 SG_{126}	—	September 20, 2011	Kitt Peak	Spacewatch	·	2.8 km	MPC · JPL
471388	2011 SQ_{126}	—	February 28, 2008	Mount Lemmon	Mount Lemmon Survey	THM	2.3 km	MPC · JPL
471389	2011 SQ_{128}	—	September 23, 2011	Kitt Peak	Spacewatch	(159)	2.4 km	MPC · JPL
471390	2011 ST_{129}	—	October 6, 2005	Mount Lemmon	Mount Lemmon Survey	·	2.6 km	MPC · JPL
471391	2011 SV_{133}	—	March 31, 2008	Kitt Peak	Spacewatch	·	4.5 km	MPC · JPL
471392	2011 SQ_{134}	—	September 23, 2011	Kitt Peak	Spacewatch	LIX	3.3 km	MPC · JPL
471393	2011 SP_{143}	—	March 25, 2003	Mauna Kea	B. J. Gladman, J. J. Kavelaars	·	1.8 km	MPC · JPL
471394	2011 SJ_{145}	—	February 23, 2003	Kitt Peak	Spacewatch	EOS	2.3 km	MPC · JPL
471395	2011 SD_{165}	—	September 27, 2006	Mount Lemmon	Mount Lemmon Survey	·	2.0 km	MPC · JPL
471396	2011 SN_{165}	—	September 21, 2011	Catalina	CSS	·	2.1 km	MPC · JPL
471397	2011 SR_{165}	—	September 21, 2011	Catalina	CSS	·	2.7 km	MPC · JPL
471398	2011 SA_{166}	—	February 9, 2003	Kitt Peak	Spacewatch	·	3.9 km	MPC · JPL
471399	2011 SN_{166}	—	September 26, 2011	Mount Lemmon	Mount Lemmon Survey	·	2.8 km	MPC · JPL
471400	2011 SQ_{169}	—	November 25, 2006	Mount Lemmon	Mount Lemmon Survey	·	3.1 km	MPC · JPL

== 471401–471500 ==
back to top

Designation			Discovery			Properties		Ref
Permanent	Provisional	Named after	Date	Site	Discoverer(s)	Category	Diam.	Ref
471401	2011 SV_{171}	—	September 30, 2005	Mount Lemmon	Mount Lemmon Survey	EOS	2.1 km	MPC · JPL
471402	2011 SZ_{172}	—	September 28, 2011	Mount Lemmon	Mount Lemmon Survey	·	2.0 km	MPC · JPL
471403	2011 SP_{181}	—	September 22, 2011	Kitt Peak	Spacewatch	·	2.7 km	MPC · JPL
471404	2011 SO_{188}	—	October 26, 2000	Kitt Peak	Spacewatch	·	2.6 km	MPC · JPL
471405	2011 SP_{188}	—	December 17, 2007	Kitt Peak	Spacewatch	·	2.5 km	MPC · JPL
471406	2011 SU_{190}	—	October 22, 2003	Kitt Peak	Spacewatch	H	440 m	MPC · JPL
471407	2011 SS_{217}	—	October 20, 2006	Kitt Peak	Spacewatch	·	2.3 km	MPC · JPL
471408	2011 SN_{222}	—	September 23, 2011	Kitt Peak	Spacewatch	·	3.3 km	MPC · JPL
471409	2011 SM_{223}	—	November 11, 2006	Mount Lemmon	Mount Lemmon Survey	THM	1.8 km	MPC · JPL
471410	2011 SH_{226}	—	November 5, 2007	Kitt Peak	Spacewatch	·	1.5 km	MPC · JPL
471411	2011 SN_{259}	—	April 17, 2010	WISE	WISE	·	3.4 km	MPC · JPL
471412	2011 SR_{273}	—	August 3, 2010	WISE	WISE	·	2.8 km	MPC · JPL
471413	2011 SB_{274}	—	February 3, 2008	Kitt Peak	Spacewatch	·	3.4 km	MPC · JPL
471414	2011 SG_{275}	—	February 19, 2009	Kitt Peak	Spacewatch	·	3.1 km	MPC · JPL
471415	2011 SB_{276}	—	January 17, 2008	Mount Lemmon	Mount Lemmon Survey	·	2.8 km	MPC · JPL
471416	2011 TL_{2}	—	October 22, 2006	Kitt Peak	Spacewatch	(159)	2.8 km	MPC · JPL
471417	2011 TV_{15}	—	February 2, 2008	Mount Lemmon	Mount Lemmon Survey	·	2.6 km	MPC · JPL
471418	2011 TO_{16}	—	December 3, 2007	Kitt Peak	Spacewatch	·	1.8 km	MPC · JPL
471419	2011 TJ_{17}	—	April 11, 2003	Kitt Peak	Spacewatch	·	4.9 km	MPC · JPL
471420	2011 UL_{7}	—	October 18, 2011	Mount Lemmon	Mount Lemmon Survey	·	2.5 km	MPC · JPL
471421	2011 UH_{8}	—	October 18, 2011	Mount Lemmon	Mount Lemmon Survey	·	2.5 km	MPC · JPL
471422	2011 UP_{9}	—	August 8, 1999	Kitt Peak	Spacewatch	THM	2.0 km	MPC · JPL
471423	2011 UY_{28}	—	March 1, 2008	Kitt Peak	Spacewatch	·	3.3 km	MPC · JPL
471424	2011 UZ_{31}	—	February 11, 2008	Mount Lemmon	Mount Lemmon Survey	·	3.9 km	MPC · JPL
471425	2011 UC_{39}	—	April 12, 2010	WISE	WISE	·	3.7 km	MPC · JPL
471426	2011 UY_{44}	—	September 12, 2005	Kitt Peak	Spacewatch	·	1.9 km	MPC · JPL
471427	2011 UU_{45}	—	October 2, 1995	Kitt Peak	Spacewatch	·	1.9 km	MPC · JPL
471428	2011 UD_{48}	—	February 14, 2008	Mount Lemmon	Mount Lemmon Survey	·	2.7 km	MPC · JPL
471429	2011 UL_{59}	—	September 22, 2000	Socorro	LINEAR	·	2.9 km	MPC · JPL
471430	2011 UO_{63}	—	October 22, 2011	Catalina	CSS	H	560 m	MPC · JPL
471431	2011 UY_{64}	—	October 16, 2003	Kitt Peak	Spacewatch	H	460 m	MPC · JPL
471432	2011 UC_{70}	—	November 10, 2006	Kitt Peak	Spacewatch	·	4.9 km	MPC · JPL
471433	2011 UW_{83}	—	May 25, 2010	WISE	WISE	·	3.5 km	MPC · JPL
471434	2011 UB_{92}	—	November 16, 2006	Kitt Peak	Spacewatch	EOS	3.4 km	MPC · JPL
471435	2011 UQ_{93}	—	October 18, 2011	Mount Lemmon	Mount Lemmon Survey	URS	2.8 km	MPC · JPL
471436	2011 UV_{104}	—	October 1, 2011	Kitt Peak	Spacewatch	H	520 m	MPC · JPL
471437	2011 UV_{106}	—	February 18, 2010	Mount Lemmon	Mount Lemmon Survey	H	550 m	MPC · JPL
471438	2011 UB_{108}	—	March 31, 2010	WISE	WISE	·	5.3 km	MPC · JPL
471439	2011 UA_{110}	—	February 24, 2008	Mount Lemmon	Mount Lemmon Survey	EOS	2.3 km	MPC · JPL
471440	2011 UL_{115}	—	November 27, 2006	Kitt Peak	Spacewatch	·	3.2 km	MPC · JPL
471441	2011 UF_{116}	—	November 16, 2006	Kitt Peak	Spacewatch	·	2.0 km	MPC · JPL
471442	2011 US_{116}	—	October 1, 2011	Kitt Peak	Spacewatch	·	2.8 km	MPC · JPL
471443	2011 UY_{117}	—	October 1, 2011	Kitt Peak	Spacewatch	·	2.6 km	MPC · JPL
471444	2011 UH_{118}	—	March 26, 2010	WISE	WISE	·	3.7 km	MPC · JPL
471445	2011 UN_{133}	—	September 24, 2011	Mount Lemmon	Mount Lemmon Survey	·	2.8 km	MPC · JPL
471446	2011 UH_{145}	—	February 28, 2008	Kitt Peak	Spacewatch	·	1.8 km	MPC · JPL
471447	2011 UT_{145}	—	September 29, 2005	Mount Lemmon	Mount Lemmon Survey	·	4.9 km	MPC · JPL
471448	2011 UZ_{145}	—	October 24, 2011	Kitt Peak	Spacewatch	H	610 m	MPC · JPL
471449	2011 UX_{153}	—	July 31, 2005	Socorro	LINEAR	T_{j} (2.99)	4.8 km	MPC · JPL
471450	2011 UG_{159}	—	October 21, 2011	Catalina	CSS	H	610 m	MPC · JPL
471451	2011 UD_{163}	—	April 26, 2010	Mount Lemmon	Mount Lemmon Survey	H	520 m	MPC · JPL
471452	2011 UJ_{163}	—	May 12, 2010	WISE	WISE	·	3.6 km	MPC · JPL
471453	2011 UK_{168}	—	October 21, 2006	Mount Lemmon	Mount Lemmon Survey	·	1.7 km	MPC · JPL
471454	2011 UW_{172}	—	March 1, 2008	Kitt Peak	Spacewatch	·	2.7 km	MPC · JPL
471455	2011 UY_{184}	—	October 23, 2006	Mount Lemmon	Mount Lemmon Survey	·	2.9 km	MPC · JPL
471456	2011 UZ_{193}	—	October 20, 2011	Catalina	CSS	·	1.6 km	MPC · JPL
471457	2011 UW_{194}	—	March 12, 2008	Mount Lemmon	Mount Lemmon Survey	·	3.3 km	MPC · JPL
471458	2011 UU_{196}	—	February 7, 2002	Palomar	NEAT	EOS	2.3 km	MPC · JPL
471459	2011 UA_{206}	—	April 8, 2008	Mount Lemmon	Mount Lemmon Survey	CYB	3.8 km	MPC · JPL
471460	2011 UH_{207}	—	April 19, 2010	WISE	WISE	THB	3.3 km	MPC · JPL
471461	2011 UZ_{213}	—	October 1, 2011	Kitt Peak	Spacewatch	·	3.0 km	MPC · JPL
471462	2011 UH_{235}	—	October 23, 2011	Kitt Peak	Spacewatch	TIR	2.5 km	MPC · JPL
471463	2011 UK_{245}	—	September 23, 2005	Kitt Peak	Spacewatch	·	2.9 km	MPC · JPL
471464	2011 UX_{268}	—	January 10, 2008	Mount Lemmon	Mount Lemmon Survey	·	2.4 km	MPC · JPL
471465	2011 UM_{285}	—	October 12, 2005	Kitt Peak	Spacewatch	·	2.7 km	MPC · JPL
471466	2011 UJ_{306}	—	September 28, 2011	Kitt Peak	Spacewatch	EOS	1.7 km	MPC · JPL
471467	2011 UM_{309}	—	December 1, 2006	Mount Lemmon	Mount Lemmon Survey	·	2.7 km	MPC · JPL
471468	2011 UG_{323}	—	September 20, 2011	Mount Lemmon	Mount Lemmon Survey	·	2.4 km	MPC · JPL
471469	2011 UW_{324}	—	October 20, 2006	Mount Lemmon	Mount Lemmon Survey	·	2.6 km	MPC · JPL
471470	2011 UJ_{329}	—	May 7, 2010	WISE	WISE	VER	3.2 km	MPC · JPL
471471	2011 UW_{335}	—	October 22, 1995	Kitt Peak	Spacewatch	·	2.2 km	MPC · JPL
471472	2011 UU_{336}	—	May 8, 2005	Kitt Peak	Spacewatch	H	580 m	MPC · JPL
471473	2011 US_{341}	—	September 8, 2011	Kitt Peak	Spacewatch	·	2.3 km	MPC · JPL
471474	2011 UT_{341}	—	February 9, 2008	Mount Lemmon	Mount Lemmon Survey	VER	2.2 km	MPC · JPL
471475	2011 UR_{344}	—	December 19, 2007	Mount Lemmon	Mount Lemmon Survey	·	3.2 km	MPC · JPL
471476	2011 UF_{345}	—	October 1, 2005	Mount Lemmon	Mount Lemmon Survey	·	3.0 km	MPC · JPL
471477	2011 UO_{345}	—	June 29, 2005	Kitt Peak	Spacewatch	·	2.3 km	MPC · JPL
471478	2011 UX_{355}	—	October 20, 2011	Mount Lemmon	Mount Lemmon Survey	·	2.6 km	MPC · JPL
471479	2011 UN_{369}	—	September 26, 2005	Catalina	CSS	·	3.1 km	MPC · JPL
471480	2011 UB_{384}	—	September 14, 2010	Mount Lemmon	Mount Lemmon Survey	VER	2.9 km	MPC · JPL
471481	2011 UP_{386}	—	June 15, 2005	Mount Lemmon	Mount Lemmon Survey	·	1.9 km	MPC · JPL
471482	2011 UG_{396}	—	November 21, 2000	Socorro	LINEAR	·	3.5 km	MPC · JPL
471483	2011 UB_{398}	—	April 20, 2010	WISE	WISE	·	4.3 km	MPC · JPL
471484	2011 UW_{403}	—	September 23, 2011	Kitt Peak	Spacewatch	·	2.4 km	MPC · JPL
471485	2011 UH_{404}	—	November 22, 2006	Mount Lemmon	Mount Lemmon Survey	·	3.3 km	MPC · JPL
471486	2011 UM_{406}	—	January 18, 2008	Kitt Peak	Spacewatch	·	3.9 km	MPC · JPL
471487	2011 VS_{5}	—	November 3, 2011	Socorro	LINEAR	APO	400 m	MPC · JPL
471488	2011 VL_{8}	—	November 19, 2003	Socorro	LINEAR	H	660 m	MPC · JPL
471489	2011 VM_{14}	—	September 26, 2000	Socorro	LINEAR	·	3.6 km	MPC · JPL
471490	2011 WM_{10}	—	September 1, 2005	Kitt Peak	Spacewatch	·	2.4 km	MPC · JPL
471491	2011 WZ_{29}	—	September 25, 2006	Kitt Peak	Spacewatch	·	3.6 km	MPC · JPL
471492	2011 WW_{41}	—	May 16, 2010	WISE	WISE	·	3.9 km	MPC · JPL
471493	2011 WN_{48}	—	September 27, 2000	Socorro	LINEAR	·	3.2 km	MPC · JPL
471494	2011 WW_{111}	—	September 24, 2006	Kitt Peak	Spacewatch	·	3.7 km	MPC · JPL
471495	2011 WB_{112}	—	April 20, 2009	Kitt Peak	Spacewatch	·	2.0 km	MPC · JPL
471496	2011 WN_{112}	—	December 4, 2005	Kitt Peak	Spacewatch	CYB	5.4 km	MPC · JPL
471497	2011 WM_{124}	—	October 27, 2011	Mount Lemmon	Mount Lemmon Survey	LIX	2.9 km	MPC · JPL
471498	2011 WB_{138}	—	April 25, 2010	WISE	WISE	·	4.2 km	MPC · JPL
471499	2011 WO_{140}	—	September 6, 2005	Anderson Mesa	LONEOS	LIX	3.4 km	MPC · JPL
471500	2011 WL_{153}	—	September 24, 2008	Catalina	CSS	H	520 m	MPC · JPL

== 471501–471600 ==
back to top

Designation			Discovery			Properties		Ref
Permanent	Provisional	Named after	Date	Site	Discoverer(s)	Category	Diam.	Ref
471501	2011 YH_{3}	—	December 5, 2003	Socorro	LINEAR	H	760 m	MPC · JPL
471502	2011 YO_{17}	—	February 18, 2004	Kitt Peak	Spacewatch	T_{j} (2.93) · 3:2	6.6 km	MPC · JPL
471503	2011 YJ_{71}	—	January 28, 2010	WISE	WISE	L4	9.0 km	MPC · JPL
471504	2012 AL_{11}	—	October 13, 2010	Mount Lemmon	Mount Lemmon Survey	·	2.4 km	MPC · JPL
471505	2012 BB_{11}	—	September 30, 2005	Catalina	CSS	H	580 m	MPC · JPL
471506	2012 BF_{13}	—	January 17, 2012	Socorro	LINEAR	·	1.5 km	MPC · JPL
471507	2012 BQ_{24}	—	January 19, 2012	Catalina	CSS	·	1.2 km	MPC · JPL
471508	2012 BT_{47}	—	March 3, 2005	Kitt Peak	Spacewatch	·	730 m	MPC · JPL
471509	2012 BR_{56}	—	January 2, 2012	Kitt Peak	Spacewatch	H	570 m	MPC · JPL
471510	2012 BB_{105}	—	March 26, 2008	Mount Lemmon	Mount Lemmon Survey	·	1.8 km	MPC · JPL
471511	2012 BC_{131}	—	December 29, 2008	Mount Lemmon	Mount Lemmon Survey	H	520 m	MPC · JPL
471512	2012 CG	—	February 1, 2012	Mount Lemmon	Mount Lemmon Survey	centaur	90 km	MPC · JPL
471513	2012 CE_{17}	—	February 3, 2012	Haleakala	Pan-STARRS 1	centaur	90 km	MPC · JPL
471514	2012 DO_{53}	—	February 21, 2012	Kitt Peak	Spacewatch	·	690 m	MPC · JPL
471515	2012 DH_{55}	—	October 2, 2010	Kitt Peak	Spacewatch	·	610 m	MPC · JPL
471516	2012 DO_{68}	—	March 23, 2006	Mount Lemmon	Mount Lemmon Survey	·	680 m	MPC · JPL
471517	2012 DX_{74}	—	March 10, 2002	Cima Ekar	ADAS	·	570 m	MPC · JPL
471518	2012 FX_{5}	—	January 9, 2008	Mount Lemmon	Mount Lemmon Survey	EUN	1.2 km	MPC · JPL
471519	2012 FC_{12}	—	March 16, 2012	Kitt Peak	Spacewatch	MAS	560 m	MPC · JPL
471520	2012 FA_{66}	—	October 19, 2006	Kitt Peak	Spacewatch	·	570 m	MPC · JPL
471521	2012 FT_{72}	—	September 15, 2009	Kitt Peak	Spacewatch	·	1.4 km	MPC · JPL
471522	2012 GR_{18}	—	May 10, 2005	Kitt Peak	Spacewatch	·	850 m	MPC · JPL
471523	2012 GV_{19}	—	October 19, 2003	Kitt Peak	Spacewatch	·	710 m	MPC · JPL
471524	2012 GV_{26}	—	March 12, 2005	Kitt Peak	Spacewatch	·	500 m	MPC · JPL
471525	2012 GR_{34}	—	March 11, 2005	Mount Lemmon	Mount Lemmon Survey	·	560 m	MPC · JPL
471526	2012 GU_{39}	—	December 31, 2007	Kitt Peak	Spacewatch	·	980 m	MPC · JPL
471527	2012 HS_{4}	—	February 2, 2008	Kitt Peak	Spacewatch	·	1.1 km	MPC · JPL
471528	2012 HH_{9}	—	December 19, 2007	Mount Lemmon	Mount Lemmon Survey	·	1.2 km	MPC · JPL
471529	2012 HW_{9}	—	February 13, 2008	Mount Lemmon	Mount Lemmon Survey	·	2.0 km	MPC · JPL
471530	2012 HW_{22}	—	March 1, 2012	Mount Lemmon	Mount Lemmon Survey	·	1.6 km	MPC · JPL
471531	2012 HM_{27}	—	March 28, 2012	Kitt Peak	Spacewatch	·	660 m	MPC · JPL
471532	2012 HS_{57}	—	March 19, 2001	Anderson Mesa	LONEOS	·	990 m	MPC · JPL
471533	2012 HB_{58}	—	March 15, 2008	Mount Lemmon	Mount Lemmon Survey	PHO	790 m	MPC · JPL
471534	2012 HN_{63}	—	April 20, 2012	Kitt Peak	Spacewatch	·	680 m	MPC · JPL
471535	2012 HT_{72}	—	January 10, 2008	Mount Lemmon	Mount Lemmon Survey	·	760 m	MPC · JPL
471536	2012 JS_{9}	—	April 28, 2012	Mount Lemmon	Mount Lemmon Survey	NYS	950 m	MPC · JPL
471537	2012 JS_{12}	—	April 29, 2012	Mount Lemmon	Mount Lemmon Survey	V	510 m	MPC · JPL
471538	2012 JZ_{22}	—	December 4, 2007	Mount Lemmon	Mount Lemmon Survey	·	780 m	MPC · JPL
471539	2012 JV_{24}	—	April 16, 2012	Kitt Peak	Spacewatch	·	1.1 km	MPC · JPL
471540	2012 JE_{34}	—	August 16, 2009	Catalina	CSS	·	1.0 km	MPC · JPL
471541	2012 JS_{50}	—	October 3, 2006	Mount Lemmon	Mount Lemmon Survey	PHO	900 m	MPC · JPL
471542	2012 JD_{58}	—	December 6, 2010	Mount Lemmon	Mount Lemmon Survey	·	600 m	MPC · JPL
471543	2012 JE_{59}	—	October 2, 2006	Mount Lemmon	Mount Lemmon Survey	·	490 m	MPC · JPL
471544	2012 JB_{65}	—	April 8, 2008	Kitt Peak	Spacewatch	·	1.1 km	MPC · JPL
471545	2012 KC_{13}	—	June 11, 2005	Catalina	CSS	·	1.0 km	MPC · JPL
471546	2012 KG_{31}	—	March 15, 2012	Mount Lemmon	Mount Lemmon Survey	·	930 m	MPC · JPL
471547	2012 KY_{49}	—	May 21, 2012	Mount Lemmon	Mount Lemmon Survey	·	1.9 km	MPC · JPL
471548	2012 KJ_{50}	—	June 10, 2005	Kitt Peak	Spacewatch	·	850 m	MPC · JPL
471549	2012 KP_{50}	—	June 14, 2008	Kitt Peak	Spacewatch	·	1.4 km	MPC · JPL
471550	2012 LP_{4}	—	May 24, 2001	Socorro	LINEAR	·	1.2 km	MPC · JPL
471551	2012 LY_{16}	—	September 16, 2009	Mount Lemmon	Mount Lemmon Survey	·	850 m	MPC · JPL
471552	2012 LT_{25}	—	November 12, 2005	Socorro	LINEAR	·	1.6 km	MPC · JPL
471553	2012 NM	—	September 24, 2008	Mount Lemmon	Mount Lemmon Survey	·	1.1 km	MPC · JPL
471554	2012 NG_{1}	—	February 16, 2007	Mount Lemmon	Mount Lemmon Survey	·	1.4 km	MPC · JPL
471555	2012 OF_{1}	—	May 29, 2012	Mount Lemmon	Mount Lemmon Survey	·	1.5 km	MPC · JPL
471556	2012 PJ_{13}	—	January 31, 2006	Mount Lemmon	Mount Lemmon Survey	·	1.4 km	MPC · JPL
471557	2012 PH_{14}	—	August 10, 2012	Kitt Peak	Spacewatch	EUN	1.1 km	MPC · JPL
471558	2012 PA_{18}	—	September 22, 2008	Catalina	CSS	·	1.6 km	MPC · JPL
471559	2012 PZ_{23}	—	September 16, 2004	Socorro	LINEAR	·	1.3 km	MPC · JPL
471560	2012 PZ_{26}	—	December 10, 2005	Kitt Peak	Spacewatch	·	1.0 km	MPC · JPL
471561	2012 PO_{30}	—	July 18, 2012	Catalina	CSS	·	2.0 km	MPC · JPL
471562	2012 PH_{38}	—	September 28, 2008	Catalina	CSS	(5)	1.0 km	MPC · JPL
471563	2012 PO_{39}	—	June 8, 2010	WISE	WISE	·	4.4 km	MPC · JPL
471564	2012 QZ_{2}	—	December 18, 2009	Kitt Peak	Spacewatch	·	1.0 km	MPC · JPL
471565	2012 QN_{22}	—	August 14, 2012	Kitt Peak	Spacewatch	·	1.8 km	MPC · JPL
471566	2012 QV_{24}	—	August 24, 2012	Kitt Peak	Spacewatch	·	1.6 km	MPC · JPL
471567	2012 QO_{25}	—	August 10, 2012	Kitt Peak	Spacewatch	·	1.5 km	MPC · JPL
471568	2012 QW_{25}	—	January 23, 2010	WISE	WISE	·	3.5 km	MPC · JPL
471569	2012 QG_{26}	—	February 18, 2010	Kitt Peak	Spacewatch	·	2.0 km	MPC · JPL
471570	2012 QN_{27}	—	September 3, 2008	Kitt Peak	Spacewatch	·	1.1 km	MPC · JPL
471571	2012 QE_{33}	—	September 3, 2008	Kitt Peak	Spacewatch	·	1.3 km	MPC · JPL
471572	2012 QO_{41}	—	December 10, 2004	Kitt Peak	Spacewatch	JUN	1.1 km	MPC · JPL
471573	2012 QZ_{45}	—	January 30, 2006	Kitt Peak	Spacewatch	·	1.6 km	MPC · JPL
471574	2012 QQ_{49}	—	March 6, 2011	Kitt Peak	Spacewatch	MAR	860 m	MPC · JPL
471575	2012 QO_{51}	—	August 25, 2012	Catalina	CSS	·	1.6 km	MPC · JPL
471576	2012 RD_{1}	—	March 16, 2007	Mount Lemmon	Mount Lemmon Survey	·	1.2 km	MPC · JPL
471577	2012 RV_{2}	—	August 25, 2012	Mount Lemmon	Mount Lemmon Survey	EUN	1.3 km	MPC · JPL
471578	2012 RW_{2}	—	September 8, 2008	Catalina	CSS	·	1.7 km	MPC · JPL
471579	2012 RR_{3}	—	September 15, 2004	Kitt Peak	Spacewatch	(5)	950 m	MPC · JPL
471580	2012 RX_{3}	—	September 26, 2008	Kitt Peak	Spacewatch	·	1.3 km	MPC · JPL
471581	2012 RT_{6}	—	June 23, 2012	Mount Lemmon	Mount Lemmon Survey	·	1.7 km	MPC · JPL
471582	2012 RE_{9}	—	July 13, 2004	Siding Spring	SSS	·	1.4 km	MPC · JPL
471583	2012 RK_{13}	—	July 29, 2008	Mount Lemmon	Mount Lemmon Survey	·	1.9 km	MPC · JPL
471584	2012 RJ_{16}	—	September 19, 1995	Kitt Peak	Spacewatch	·	1.0 km	MPC · JPL
471585	2012 RM_{19}	—	April 2, 2006	Kitt Peak	Spacewatch	·	2.3 km	MPC · JPL
471586	2012 RH_{20}	—	September 8, 1999	Socorro	LINEAR	JUN	1.2 km	MPC · JPL
471587	2012 RU_{20}	—	August 24, 2012	Kitt Peak	Spacewatch	ADE	2.1 km	MPC · JPL
471588	2012 RR_{21}	—	September 26, 1998	Socorro	LINEAR	·	2.2 km	MPC · JPL
471589	2012 RK_{29}	—	October 24, 2008	Catalina	CSS	·	1.4 km	MPC · JPL
471590	2012 RW_{29}	—	November 6, 2008	Catalina	CSS	·	1.7 km	MPC · JPL
471591	2012 RV_{30}	—	January 16, 2009	Mount Lemmon	Mount Lemmon Survey	·	1.5 km	MPC · JPL
471592	2012 RB_{34}	—	October 22, 1995	Kitt Peak	Spacewatch	MIS	1.8 km	MPC · JPL
471593	2012 RW_{38}	—	September 15, 2012	Kitt Peak	Spacewatch	·	1.3 km	MPC · JPL
471594	2012 RM_{39}	—	May 1, 2006	Catalina	CSS	·	2.4 km	MPC · JPL
471595	2012 RQ_{39}	—	September 28, 2003	Kitt Peak	Spacewatch	·	1.6 km	MPC · JPL
471596	2012 RZ_{39}	—	October 30, 2008	Catalina	CSS	EUN	1.3 km	MPC · JPL
471597	2012 RB_{42}	—	September 28, 1994	Kitt Peak	Spacewatch	·	1.3 km	MPC · JPL
471598	2012 SH	—	September 16, 2003	Kitt Peak	Spacewatch	·	2.0 km	MPC · JPL
471599	2012 SP_{3}	—	November 18, 2008	Kitt Peak	Spacewatch	·	1.5 km	MPC · JPL
471600	2012 SY_{5}	—	September 17, 2012	Mount Lemmon	Mount Lemmon Survey	·	2.1 km	MPC · JPL

== 471601–471700 ==
back to top

Designation			Discovery			Properties		Ref
Permanent	Provisional	Named after	Date	Site	Discoverer(s)	Category	Diam.	Ref
471601	2012 SM_{6}	—	January 15, 2005	Kitt Peak	Spacewatch	·	1.2 km	MPC · JPL
471602	2012 SN_{11}	—	October 20, 2008	Kitt Peak	Spacewatch	·	1.5 km	MPC · JPL
471603	2012 SJ_{16}	—	September 17, 2012	Kitt Peak	Spacewatch	·	2.0 km	MPC · JPL
471604	2012 SV_{16}	—	March 2, 2011	Mount Lemmon	Mount Lemmon Survey	·	1.3 km	MPC · JPL
471605	2012 ST_{23}	—	October 23, 2008	Kitt Peak	Spacewatch	MIS	1.8 km	MPC · JPL
471606	2012 SR_{27}	—	September 20, 2008	Catalina	CSS	·	1.5 km	MPC · JPL
471607	2012 SG_{30}	—	October 3, 2008	Mount Lemmon	Mount Lemmon Survey	·	1.2 km	MPC · JPL
471608	2012 SP_{30}	—	September 28, 2008	Mount Lemmon	Mount Lemmon Survey	·	1.1 km	MPC · JPL
471609	2012 SU_{33}	—	September 7, 2008	Mount Lemmon	Mount Lemmon Survey	·	980 m	MPC · JPL
471610	2012 SH_{39}	—	March 2, 1997	Kitt Peak	Spacewatch	·	1.9 km	MPC · JPL
471611	2012 SL_{39}	—	October 9, 2004	Kitt Peak	Spacewatch	·	870 m	MPC · JPL
471612	2012 SR_{45}	—	March 16, 2005	Mount Lemmon	Mount Lemmon Survey	·	1.0 km	MPC · JPL
471613	2012 SQ_{58}	—	September 16, 2012	Catalina	CSS	·	2.1 km	MPC · JPL
471614	2012 SF_{59}	—	October 30, 2008	Mount Lemmon	Mount Lemmon Survey	RAF	840 m	MPC · JPL
471615	2012 SK_{59}	—	December 4, 2008	Mount Lemmon	Mount Lemmon Survey	·	1.6 km	MPC · JPL
471616	2012 TZ_{1}	—	September 22, 2012	Kitt Peak	Spacewatch	·	1.9 km	MPC · JPL
471617	2012 TQ_{3}	—	October 9, 2008	Mount Lemmon	Mount Lemmon Survey	·	1.0 km	MPC · JPL
471618	2012 TY_{5}	—	April 6, 2005	Kitt Peak	Spacewatch	EOS	2.1 km	MPC · JPL
471619	2012 TB_{13}	—	September 7, 1999	Kitt Peak	Spacewatch	EUN	1.4 km	MPC · JPL
471620	2012 TK_{16}	—	April 25, 2007	Kitt Peak	Spacewatch	·	1.7 km	MPC · JPL
471621	2012 TM_{16}	—	March 3, 2005	Catalina	CSS	AGN	1.5 km	MPC · JPL
471622	2012 TP_{17}	—	September 13, 2007	Mount Lemmon	Mount Lemmon Survey	·	1.9 km	MPC · JPL
471623	2012 TF_{21}	—	September 15, 2012	Mount Lemmon	Mount Lemmon Survey	·	1.5 km	MPC · JPL
471624	2012 TZ_{24}	—	October 31, 2008	Kitt Peak	Spacewatch	·	1.5 km	MPC · JPL
471625	2012 TB_{25}	—	April 10, 2010	Mount Lemmon	Mount Lemmon Survey	·	2.9 km	MPC · JPL
471626	2012 TS_{26}	—	May 8, 2006	Mount Lemmon	Mount Lemmon Survey	GEF	1.3 km	MPC · JPL
471627	2012 TD_{27}	—	January 30, 2006	Kitt Peak	Spacewatch	·	1.6 km	MPC · JPL
471628	2012 TS_{28}	—	March 6, 2011	Kitt Peak	Spacewatch	·	1.7 km	MPC · JPL
471629	2012 TX_{32}	—	September 25, 2012	Catalina	CSS	·	1.8 km	MPC · JPL
471630	2012 TE_{35}	—	September 26, 2012	Catalina	CSS	JUN	1.2 km	MPC · JPL
471631	2012 TJ_{49}	—	October 19, 2003	Kitt Peak	Spacewatch	·	1.4 km	MPC · JPL
471632	2012 TT_{50}	—	March 23, 2006	Mount Lemmon	Mount Lemmon Survey	EUN	1.2 km	MPC · JPL
471633	2012 TC_{54}	—	October 25, 2008	Kitt Peak	Spacewatch	EUN	1.0 km	MPC · JPL
471634	2012 TV_{55}	—	September 24, 2008	Mount Lemmon	Mount Lemmon Survey	·	930 m	MPC · JPL
471635	2012 TD_{57}	—	January 29, 2009	Mount Lemmon	Mount Lemmon Survey	(13314)	2.2 km	MPC · JPL
471636	2012 TX_{58}	—	October 3, 2003	Kitt Peak	Spacewatch	·	1.5 km	MPC · JPL
471637	2012 TD_{59}	—	October 25, 2003	Kitt Peak	Spacewatch	·	1.8 km	MPC · JPL
471638	2012 TJ_{60}	—	October 6, 2008	Mount Lemmon	Mount Lemmon Survey	(5)	1.3 km	MPC · JPL
471639	2012 TN_{67}	—	August 21, 2003	Campo Imperatore	CINEOS	·	1.1 km	MPC · JPL
471640	2012 TP_{67}	—	October 8, 2012	Mount Lemmon	Mount Lemmon Survey	·	1.7 km	MPC · JPL
471641	2012 TD_{82}	—	September 17, 2012	Mount Lemmon	Mount Lemmon Survey	·	2.3 km	MPC · JPL
471642	2012 TB_{84}	—	September 14, 2007	Mount Lemmon	Mount Lemmon Survey	·	1.9 km	MPC · JPL
471643	2012 TT_{88}	—	September 18, 2003	Kitt Peak	Spacewatch	·	1.6 km	MPC · JPL
471644	2012 TG_{89}	—	January 17, 2005	Kitt Peak	Spacewatch	·	1.4 km	MPC · JPL
471645	2012 TU_{89}	—	October 23, 2008	Kitt Peak	Spacewatch	·	1.6 km	MPC · JPL
471646	2012 TS_{97}	—	September 21, 2012	Kitt Peak	Spacewatch	·	1.3 km	MPC · JPL
471647	2012 TR_{98}	—	January 26, 2009	Mount Lemmon	Mount Lemmon Survey	AEO	830 m	MPC · JPL
471648	2012 TP_{99}	—	October 21, 2007	Mount Lemmon	Mount Lemmon Survey	LIX	4.5 km	MPC · JPL
471649	2012 TN_{101}	—	September 16, 2012	Kitt Peak	Spacewatch	·	1.9 km	MPC · JPL
471650	2012 TR_{107}	—	October 29, 2008	Kitt Peak	Spacewatch	EUN	1.5 km	MPC · JPL
471651	2012 TW_{107}	—	September 30, 2003	Kitt Peak	Spacewatch	·	1.6 km	MPC · JPL
471652	2012 TE_{114}	—	September 25, 2012	Kitt Peak	Spacewatch	·	2.1 km	MPC · JPL
471653	2012 TL_{115}	—	December 2, 2008	Kitt Peak	Spacewatch	·	1.7 km	MPC · JPL
471654	2012 TD_{118}	—	July 29, 2008	Mount Lemmon	Mount Lemmon Survey	EUN	1.1 km	MPC · JPL
471655	2012 TQ_{125}	—	October 16, 1977	Palomar	C. J. van Houten, I. van Houten-Groeneveld, T. Gehrels	EUN	1.3 km	MPC · JPL
471656	2012 TE_{126}	—	March 12, 2010	Mount Lemmon	Mount Lemmon Survey	EUN	1.3 km	MPC · JPL
471657	2012 TA_{131}	—	October 7, 2008	Mount Lemmon	Mount Lemmon Survey	(5)	1.3 km	MPC · JPL
471658	2012 TK_{134}	—	September 18, 2003	Kitt Peak	Spacewatch	NEM	2.0 km	MPC · JPL
471659	2012 TV_{136}	—	October 8, 2012	Mount Lemmon	Mount Lemmon Survey	·	2.2 km	MPC · JPL
471660	2012 TG_{137}	—	October 8, 2012	Mount Lemmon	Mount Lemmon Survey	·	1.8 km	MPC · JPL
471661	2012 TO_{137}	—	March 13, 2011	Mount Lemmon	Mount Lemmon Survey	·	1.3 km	MPC · JPL
471662	2012 TH_{145}	—	August 24, 2008	Kitt Peak	Spacewatch	MAR	830 m	MPC · JPL
471663	2012 TR_{148}	—	October 24, 2008	Catalina	CSS	EUN	1.6 km	MPC · JPL
471664	2012 TS_{149}	—	October 8, 2012	Mount Lemmon	Mount Lemmon Survey	·	1.5 km	MPC · JPL
471665	2012 TZ_{150}	—	September 28, 2003	Kitt Peak	Spacewatch	·	1.6 km	MPC · JPL
471666	2012 TD_{151}	—	September 19, 2012	Mount Lemmon	Mount Lemmon Survey	·	2.2 km	MPC · JPL
471667	2012 TQ_{160}	—	October 8, 2012	Mount Lemmon	Mount Lemmon Survey	·	1.2 km	MPC · JPL
471668	2012 TR_{165}	—	October 8, 2012	Mount Lemmon	Mount Lemmon Survey	HOF	2.1 km	MPC · JPL
471669	2012 TL_{166}	—	February 9, 2005	Mount Lemmon	Mount Lemmon Survey	·	1.4 km	MPC · JPL
471670	2012 TW_{166}	—	April 26, 2006	Kitt Peak	Spacewatch	·	1.8 km	MPC · JPL
471671	2012 TY_{167}	—	October 29, 2003	Kitt Peak	Spacewatch	GEF	1.2 km	MPC · JPL
471672	2012 TK_{170}	—	October 9, 2012	Mount Lemmon	Mount Lemmon Survey	·	1.9 km	MPC · JPL
471673	2012 TT_{171}	—	September 19, 2003	Kitt Peak	Spacewatch	EUN	880 m	MPC · JPL
471674	2012 TT_{175}	—	October 25, 2008	Kitt Peak	Spacewatch	WIT	920 m	MPC · JPL
471675	2012 TK_{178}	—	September 19, 2003	Kitt Peak	Spacewatch	NEM	2.0 km	MPC · JPL
471676	2012 TU_{185}	—	October 15, 2001	Socorro	LINEAR	·	3.1 km	MPC · JPL
471677	2012 TM_{186}	—	October 9, 2012	Mount Lemmon	Mount Lemmon Survey	·	2.1 km	MPC · JPL
471678	2012 TU_{187}	—	October 28, 2008	Kitt Peak	Spacewatch	·	1.5 km	MPC · JPL
471679	2012 TT_{189}	—	December 21, 2008	Catalina	CSS	·	1.4 km	MPC · JPL
471680	2012 TL_{190}	—	September 24, 2007	Kitt Peak	Spacewatch	·	1.9 km	MPC · JPL
471681	2012 TM_{192}	—	October 21, 2008	Kitt Peak	Spacewatch	·	1.2 km	MPC · JPL
471682	2012 TA_{194}	—	August 28, 2012	Mount Lemmon	Mount Lemmon Survey	·	3.3 km	MPC · JPL
471683	2012 TR_{197}	—	February 4, 2006	Kitt Peak	Spacewatch	·	1.8 km	MPC · JPL
471684	2012 TE_{198}	—	September 25, 2007	Mount Lemmon	Mount Lemmon Survey	·	1.8 km	MPC · JPL
471685	2012 TX_{210}	—	September 24, 2012	Kitt Peak	Spacewatch	·	2.0 km	MPC · JPL
471686	2012 TH_{211}	—	October 21, 2007	Mount Lemmon	Mount Lemmon Survey	·	2.7 km	MPC · JPL
471687	2012 TR_{211}	—	September 25, 2012	Kitt Peak	Spacewatch	·	1.8 km	MPC · JPL
471688	2012 TU_{221}	—	September 17, 2012	Mount Lemmon	Mount Lemmon Survey	·	1.7 km	MPC · JPL
471689	2012 TR_{225}	—	November 24, 2008	Kitt Peak	Spacewatch	·	1.2 km	MPC · JPL
471690	2012 TS_{225}	—	November 7, 2008	Mount Lemmon	Mount Lemmon Survey	·	1.5 km	MPC · JPL
471691	2012 TX_{229}	—	August 22, 2007	Anderson Mesa	LONEOS	·	1.9 km	MPC · JPL
471692	2012 TZ_{232}	—	September 25, 2008	Mount Lemmon	Mount Lemmon Survey	·	1.0 km	MPC · JPL
471693	2012 TE_{234}	—	December 1, 2008	Kitt Peak	Spacewatch	·	1.6 km	MPC · JPL
471694	2012 TL_{234}	—	September 27, 2008	Mount Lemmon	Mount Lemmon Survey	(5)	1.2 km	MPC · JPL
471695	2012 TL_{240}	—	October 8, 2012	Mount Lemmon	Mount Lemmon Survey	AGN	1.2 km	MPC · JPL
471696	2012 TH_{242}	—	September 25, 1998	Kitt Peak	Spacewatch	·	2.2 km	MPC · JPL
471697	2012 TN_{242}	—	September 15, 2012	Kitt Peak	Spacewatch	EOS	1.8 km	MPC · JPL
471698	2012 TM_{243}	—	November 19, 2008	Mount Lemmon	Mount Lemmon Survey	·	1.3 km	MPC · JPL
471699	2012 TZ_{246}	—	December 22, 2008	Kitt Peak	Spacewatch	·	1.9 km	MPC · JPL
471700	2012 TP_{255}	—	November 16, 1995	Kitt Peak	Spacewatch	·	1.4 km	MPC · JPL

== 471701–471800 ==
back to top

Designation			Discovery			Properties		Ref
Permanent	Provisional	Named after	Date	Site	Discoverer(s)	Category	Diam.	Ref
471701	2012 TK_{256}	—	September 27, 2003	Kitt Peak	Spacewatch	·	1.5 km	MPC · JPL
471702	2012 TV_{258}	—	July 28, 2011	Siding Spring	SSS	·	2.2 km	MPC · JPL
471703	2012 TF_{261}	—	April 8, 2010	Kitt Peak	Spacewatch	NEM	2.0 km	MPC · JPL
471704	2012 TH_{263}	—	January 27, 2006	Kitt Peak	Spacewatch	EUN	1.0 km	MPC · JPL
471705	2012 TD_{282}	—	October 11, 2012	Mount Lemmon	Mount Lemmon Survey	·	2.1 km	MPC · JPL
471706	2012 TU_{288}	—	October 10, 2012	Mount Lemmon	Mount Lemmon Survey	GEF	1.3 km	MPC · JPL
471707	2012 TS_{290}	—	February 7, 1997	Kitt Peak	Spacewatch	MAR	1.2 km	MPC · JPL
471708	2012 TZ_{293}	—	September 11, 2007	Kitt Peak	Spacewatch	·	1.6 km	MPC · JPL
471709	2012 TN_{294}	—	December 20, 2004	Mount Lemmon	Mount Lemmon Survey	·	1.4 km	MPC · JPL
471710	2012 TM_{298}	—	October 11, 2006	Kitt Peak	Spacewatch	·	3.2 km	MPC · JPL
471711	2012 TG_{300}	—	October 15, 2012	Mount Lemmon	Mount Lemmon Survey	·	2.2 km	MPC · JPL
471712	2012 TP_{305}	—	September 17, 2003	Kitt Peak	Spacewatch	MRX	970 m	MPC · JPL
471713	2012 TT_{305}	—	September 27, 2008	Mount Lemmon	Mount Lemmon Survey	MAR	860 m	MPC · JPL
471714	2012 TN_{306}	—	November 7, 2008	Catalina	CSS	·	1.3 km	MPC · JPL
471715	2012 TV_{306}	—	December 4, 2008	Kitt Peak	Spacewatch	(5)	1.1 km	MPC · JPL
471716	2012 TW_{314}	—	October 26, 2008	Catalina	CSS	·	1.8 km	MPC · JPL
471717	2012 TK_{316}	—	October 13, 2012	Catalina	CSS	·	1.9 km	MPC · JPL
471718	2012 TQ_{318}	—	October 19, 2003	Kitt Peak	Spacewatch	·	2.1 km	MPC · JPL
471719	2012 TA_{319}	—	December 15, 2004	Kitt Peak	Spacewatch	·	1.8 km	MPC · JPL
471720	2012 TB_{319}	—	December 7, 1999	Socorro	LINEAR	·	1.7 km	MPC · JPL
471721	2012 UB	—	April 11, 2007	Kitt Peak	Spacewatch	(194)	1.5 km	MPC · JPL
471722	2012 UG_{3}	—	June 21, 2007	Mount Lemmon	Mount Lemmon Survey	·	1.4 km	MPC · JPL
471723	2012 UK_{13}	—	March 25, 2010	Kitt Peak	Spacewatch	·	3.1 km	MPC · JPL
471724	2012 UW_{15}	—	October 16, 2012	Mount Lemmon	Mount Lemmon Survey	AGN	1.1 km	MPC · JPL
471725	2012 UA_{17}	—	October 16, 2012	Mount Lemmon	Mount Lemmon Survey	HOF	2.4 km	MPC · JPL
471726	2012 UL_{17}	—	September 18, 2012	Kitt Peak	Spacewatch	·	1.9 km	MPC · JPL
471727	2012 US_{23}	—	March 14, 2010	Mount Lemmon	Mount Lemmon Survey	·	2.1 km	MPC · JPL
471728	2012 UP_{24}	—	December 29, 2008	Mount Lemmon	Mount Lemmon Survey	EOS	1.7 km	MPC · JPL
471729	2012 UH_{30}	—	September 18, 2004	Socorro	LINEAR	·	1.2 km	MPC · JPL
471730	2012 UJ_{33}	—	December 1, 2003	Kitt Peak	Spacewatch	·	1.8 km	MPC · JPL
471731	2012 UM_{33}	—	October 8, 2012	Kitt Peak	Spacewatch	·	2.1 km	MPC · JPL
471732	2012 UO_{33}	—	October 20, 2003	Kitt Peak	Spacewatch	·	1.9 km	MPC · JPL
471733	2012 UH_{34}	—	September 20, 2003	Kitt Peak	Spacewatch	·	1.8 km	MPC · JPL
471734	2012 UT_{34}	—	September 23, 2012	Mount Lemmon	Mount Lemmon Survey	·	2.3 km	MPC · JPL
471735	2012 UN_{38}	—	June 27, 2011	Mount Lemmon	Mount Lemmon Survey	·	2.2 km	MPC · JPL
471736	2012 UH_{41}	—	October 9, 2012	Kitt Peak	Spacewatch	·	1.6 km	MPC · JPL
471737	2012 UG_{43}	—	October 16, 2003	Kitt Peak	Spacewatch	·	1.8 km	MPC · JPL
471738	2012 UJ_{43}	—	October 24, 2003	Kitt Peak	Spacewatch	PAD	1.4 km	MPC · JPL
471739	2012 UC_{44}	—	September 30, 2003	Kitt Peak	Spacewatch	MRX	770 m	MPC · JPL
471740	2012 UF_{44}	—	May 1, 2010	WISE	WISE	·	4.4 km	MPC · JPL
471741	2012 UR_{47}	—	January 16, 2005	Kitt Peak	Spacewatch	·	1.3 km	MPC · JPL
471742	2012 UN_{48}	—	December 22, 2008	Kitt Peak	Spacewatch	AST	1.5 km	MPC · JPL
471743	2012 UX_{51}	—	October 26, 1994	Kitt Peak	Spacewatch	·	1.2 km	MPC · JPL
471744	2012 UW_{53}	—	September 13, 2007	Mount Lemmon	Mount Lemmon Survey	·	2.1 km	MPC · JPL
471745	2012 UN_{54}	—	October 5, 2012	Kitt Peak	Spacewatch	·	2.0 km	MPC · JPL
471746	2012 UL_{58}	—	December 4, 2008	Mount Lemmon	Mount Lemmon Survey	KON · fast	1.9 km	MPC · JPL
471747	2012 UY_{60}	—	October 14, 2007	Mount Lemmon	Mount Lemmon Survey	·	2.7 km	MPC · JPL
471748	2012 UY_{72}	—	September 25, 2012	Mount Lemmon	Mount Lemmon Survey	·	1.5 km	MPC · JPL
471749	2012 US_{83}	—	November 30, 2008	Kitt Peak	Spacewatch	EUN	1.0 km	MPC · JPL
471750	2012 UV_{89}	—	December 1, 2003	Kitt Peak	Spacewatch	AEO	860 m	MPC · JPL
471751	2012 UW_{90}	—	September 21, 2003	Kitt Peak	Spacewatch	·	1.5 km	MPC · JPL
471752	2012 UE_{91}	—	April 29, 2006	Kitt Peak	Spacewatch	·	2.0 km	MPC · JPL
471753	2012 UN_{94}	—	October 20, 2003	Kitt Peak	Spacewatch	·	1.6 km	MPC · JPL
471754	2012 UH_{96}	—	April 24, 2006	Kitt Peak	Spacewatch	·	1.6 km	MPC · JPL
471755	2012 UF_{104}	—	October 16, 2006	Kitt Peak	Spacewatch	·	2.5 km	MPC · JPL
471756	2012 UV_{106}	—	October 24, 1995	Kitt Peak	Spacewatch	VER	2.3 km	MPC · JPL
471757	2012 UQ_{107}	—	October 25, 2008	Kitt Peak	Spacewatch	·	1.3 km	MPC · JPL
471758	2012 UA_{109}	—	October 23, 2003	Kitt Peak	Spacewatch	·	1.5 km	MPC · JPL
471759	2012 UF_{111}	—	October 15, 2012	Kitt Peak	Spacewatch	·	2.9 km	MPC · JPL
471760	2012 UZ_{111}	—	August 28, 2006	Kitt Peak	Spacewatch	·	1.6 km	MPC · JPL
471761	2012 UR_{112}	—	November 6, 2008	Catalina	CSS	·	1.4 km	MPC · JPL
471762	2012 UP_{113}	—	September 16, 2012	Kitt Peak	Spacewatch	·	1.5 km	MPC · JPL
471763	2012 UP_{114}	—	September 28, 2003	Kitt Peak	Spacewatch	·	1.7 km	MPC · JPL
471764	2012 UN_{117}	—	September 25, 2012	Mount Lemmon	Mount Lemmon Survey	·	1.6 km	MPC · JPL
471765	2012 UD_{123}	—	November 3, 2007	Kitt Peak	Spacewatch	·	1.9 km	MPC · JPL
471766	2012 UT_{124}	—	October 3, 2003	Kitt Peak	Spacewatch	·	1.5 km	MPC · JPL
471767	2012 UP_{130}	—	December 1, 2003	Kitt Peak	Spacewatch	GEF	880 m	MPC · JPL
471768	2012 UZ_{132}	—	September 11, 2007	Catalina	CSS	·	2.0 km	MPC · JPL
471769	2012 UO_{133}	—	October 10, 1999	Socorro	LINEAR	·	1.2 km	MPC · JPL
471770	2012 UF_{134}	—	August 11, 2007	Anderson Mesa	LONEOS	DOR	2.6 km	MPC · JPL
471771	2012 UY_{138}	—	February 13, 2010	Mount Lemmon	Mount Lemmon Survey	·	1.6 km	MPC · JPL
471772	2012 UY_{139}	—	October 10, 2012	Mount Lemmon	Mount Lemmon Survey	·	1.7 km	MPC · JPL
471773	2012 UA_{141}	—	October 6, 1996	Kitt Peak	Spacewatch	·	2.0 km	MPC · JPL
471774	2012 UL_{144}	—	December 30, 2008	Kitt Peak	Spacewatch	AGN	1.2 km	MPC · JPL
471775	2012 UL_{146}	—	December 1, 2008	Kitt Peak	Spacewatch	·	1.6 km	MPC · JPL
471776	2012 US_{148}	—	April 10, 2010	Mount Lemmon	Mount Lemmon Survey	·	1.7 km	MPC · JPL
471777	2012 UE_{151}	—	October 21, 2012	Kitt Peak	Spacewatch	EOS	2.0 km	MPC · JPL
471778	2012 UH_{169}	—	September 21, 2003	Anderson Mesa	LONEOS	JUN	980 m	MPC · JPL
471779	2012 UO_{169}	—	November 20, 2003	Socorro	LINEAR	·	2.2 km	MPC · JPL
471780	2012 UQ_{171}	—	November 20, 2008	Mount Lemmon	Mount Lemmon Survey	·	1.3 km	MPC · JPL
471781	2012 UX_{171}	—	September 16, 2003	Kitt Peak	Spacewatch	·	1.3 km	MPC · JPL
471782	2012 VD_{10}	—	July 30, 2010	WISE	WISE	·	3.2 km	MPC · JPL
471783	2012 VU_{10}	—	September 14, 2007	Catalina	CSS	·	2.0 km	MPC · JPL
471784	2012 VX_{13}	—	April 11, 2010	Mount Lemmon	Mount Lemmon Survey	KOR	1.2 km	MPC · JPL
471785	2012 VM_{20}	—	October 14, 1999	Kitt Peak	Spacewatch	·	1.3 km	MPC · JPL
471786	2012 VE_{24}	—	October 7, 2007	Mount Lemmon	Mount Lemmon Survey	·	3.5 km	MPC · JPL
471787	2012 VA_{28}	—	February 9, 2005	Mount Lemmon	Mount Lemmon Survey	·	1.9 km	MPC · JPL
471788	2012 VB_{28}	—	June 13, 2010	WISE	WISE	·	2.9 km	MPC · JPL
471789	2012 VC_{31}	—	November 19, 2003	Anderson Mesa	LONEOS	·	2.0 km	MPC · JPL
471790	2012 VF_{32}	—	May 26, 2007	Mount Lemmon	Mount Lemmon Survey	·	1.3 km	MPC · JPL
471791	2012 VR_{34}	—	October 20, 2012	Kitt Peak	Spacewatch	·	3.2 km	MPC · JPL
471792	2012 VH_{41}	—	April 2, 2006	Kitt Peak	Spacewatch	·	1.4 km	MPC · JPL
471793	2012 VX_{47}	—	September 23, 2008	Mount Lemmon	Mount Lemmon Survey	·	1.2 km	MPC · JPL
471794	2012 VT_{51}	—	November 6, 2012	Kitt Peak	Spacewatch	EOS	2.2 km	MPC · JPL
471795	2012 VC_{55}	—	September 17, 2006	Kitt Peak	Spacewatch	·	2.5 km	MPC · JPL
471796	2012 VC_{63}	—	November 18, 2003	Kitt Peak	Spacewatch	·	1.5 km	MPC · JPL
471797	2012 VX_{78}	—	September 14, 2007	Mount Lemmon	Mount Lemmon Survey	KOR	1.3 km	MPC · JPL
471798	2012 VH_{84}	—	November 6, 2012	Kitt Peak	Spacewatch	·	2.5 km	MPC · JPL
471799	2012 VJ_{86}	—	September 21, 2003	Anderson Mesa	LONEOS	·	1.1 km	MPC · JPL
471800	2012 VX_{88}	—	October 8, 2007	Kitt Peak	Spacewatch	KOR	1.2 km	MPC · JPL

== 471801–471900 ==
back to top

Designation			Discovery			Properties		Ref
Permanent	Provisional	Named after	Date	Site	Discoverer(s)	Category	Diam.	Ref
471801	2012 VU_{90}	—	November 14, 2012	Kitt Peak	Spacewatch	·	3.2 km	MPC · JPL
471802	2012 VL_{92}	—	November 2, 2007	Kitt Peak	Spacewatch	·	1.7 km	MPC · JPL
471803	2012 VU_{97}	—	September 19, 2012	Mount Lemmon	Mount Lemmon Survey	ADE	1.8 km	MPC · JPL
471804	2012 VS_{99}	—	October 22, 1995	Kitt Peak	Spacewatch	·	1.2 km	MPC · JPL
471805	2012 VX_{99}	—	November 18, 2008	Kitt Peak	Spacewatch	EUN	1.3 km	MPC · JPL
471806	2012 VA_{104}	—	December 29, 2008	Kitt Peak	Spacewatch	AGN	1.1 km	MPC · JPL
471807	2012 VB_{104}	—	October 17, 2012	Mount Lemmon	Mount Lemmon Survey	·	1.9 km	MPC · JPL
471808	2012 VJ_{105}	—	October 9, 2012	Mount Lemmon	Mount Lemmon Survey	·	1.4 km	MPC · JPL
471809	2012 VN_{111}	—	September 18, 2006	Kitt Peak	Spacewatch	·	2.5 km	MPC · JPL
471810	2012 VV_{112}	—	February 1, 2009	Mount Lemmon	Mount Lemmon Survey	·	1.9 km	MPC · JPL
471811	2012 WB_{7}	—	November 5, 2007	Kitt Peak	Spacewatch	EOS	2.2 km	MPC · JPL
471812	2012 WK_{11}	—	November 14, 2007	Kitt Peak	Spacewatch	·	1.6 km	MPC · JPL
471813	2012 WX_{11}	—	October 9, 2012	Mount Lemmon	Mount Lemmon Survey	·	2.1 km	MPC · JPL
471814	2012 WF_{12}	—	October 10, 2007	Mount Lemmon	Mount Lemmon Survey	KOR	1.2 km	MPC · JPL
471815	2012 WH_{12}	—	September 18, 2007	Mount Lemmon	Mount Lemmon Survey	·	1.5 km	MPC · JPL
471816	2012 WD_{15}	—	November 19, 2012	Kitt Peak	Spacewatch	·	2.6 km	MPC · JPL
471817	2012 WM_{16}	—	September 25, 2012	Mount Lemmon	Mount Lemmon Survey	·	2.3 km	MPC · JPL
471818	2012 WW_{16}	—	September 25, 2012	Mount Lemmon	Mount Lemmon Survey	·	1.5 km	MPC · JPL
471819	2012 WQ_{29}	—	January 29, 2009	Mount Lemmon	Mount Lemmon Survey	·	1.6 km	MPC · JPL
471820	2012 WO_{34}	—	November 26, 2012	Mount Lemmon	Mount Lemmon Survey	EOS	1.9 km	MPC · JPL
471821	2012 XD_{1}	—	October 16, 2012	Kitt Peak	Spacewatch	·	1.6 km	MPC · JPL
471822	2012 XZ_{5}	—	November 14, 2012	Mount Lemmon	Mount Lemmon Survey	·	2.0 km	MPC · JPL
471823	2012 XS_{10}	—	November 24, 2012	Catalina	CSS	·	1.3 km	MPC · JPL
471824	2012 XU_{35}	—	November 25, 2012	Kitt Peak	Spacewatch	VER	2.9 km	MPC · JPL
471825	2012 XF_{37}	—	September 18, 2007	Siding Spring	SSS	·	1.9 km	MPC · JPL
471826	2012 XR_{39}	—	November 6, 2012	Kitt Peak	Spacewatch	·	2.2 km	MPC · JPL
471827	2012 XQ_{43}	—	December 14, 2003	Kitt Peak	Spacewatch	NEM	2.1 km	MPC · JPL
471828	2012 XG_{46}	—	January 16, 2009	Kitt Peak	Spacewatch	·	1.6 km	MPC · JPL
471829	2012 XT_{56}	—	May 8, 2005	Kitt Peak	Spacewatch	KOR	1.3 km	MPC · JPL
471830	2012 XW_{58}	—	August 28, 2006	Kitt Peak	Spacewatch	·	1.7 km	MPC · JPL
471831	2012 XQ_{61}	—	October 18, 2012	Mount Lemmon	Mount Lemmon Survey	·	3.7 km	MPC · JPL
471832	2012 XD_{62}	—	November 10, 2006	Kitt Peak	Spacewatch	EOS	1.6 km	MPC · JPL
471833	2012 XV_{64}	—	September 17, 2006	Kitt Peak	Spacewatch	EOS	1.7 km	MPC · JPL
471834	2012 XQ_{69}	—	December 5, 2012	Mount Lemmon	Mount Lemmon Survey	EOS	1.7 km	MPC · JPL
471835	2012 XG_{70}	—	March 25, 2010	Mount Lemmon	Mount Lemmon Survey	·	2.5 km	MPC · JPL
471836	2012 XZ_{74}	—	September 19, 2003	Anderson Mesa	LONEOS	·	1.5 km	MPC · JPL
471837	2012 XM_{80}	—	November 7, 2012	Mount Lemmon	Mount Lemmon Survey	·	1.9 km	MPC · JPL
471838	2012 XM_{83}	—	December 30, 2007	Kitt Peak	Spacewatch	EOS	2.0 km	MPC · JPL
471839	2012 XN_{84}	—	November 5, 2007	Mount Lemmon	Mount Lemmon Survey	·	1.8 km	MPC · JPL
471840	2012 XC_{86}	—	January 1, 2008	Kitt Peak	Spacewatch	TEL	1.5 km	MPC · JPL
471841	2012 XB_{94}	—	July 18, 2007	Mount Lemmon	Mount Lemmon Survey	AEO	1.1 km	MPC · JPL
471842	2012 XH_{105}	—	July 4, 2005	Kitt Peak	Spacewatch	·	3.4 km	MPC · JPL
471843	2012 XH_{106}	—	March 2, 2008	Catalina	CSS	·	2.8 km	MPC · JPL
471844	2012 XX_{116}	—	December 31, 2008	XuYi	PMO NEO Survey Program	·	1.9 km	MPC · JPL
471845	2012 XX_{133}	—	September 14, 2007	Catalina	CSS	·	2.3 km	MPC · JPL
471846	2012 XJ_{135}	—	May 2, 2006	Kitt Peak	Spacewatch	(18466)	2.3 km	MPC · JPL
471847	2012 XO_{139}	—	February 15, 2010	Mount Lemmon	Mount Lemmon Survey	·	1.6 km	MPC · JPL
471848	2012 XQ_{140}	—	September 13, 2007	Catalina	CSS	·	1.9 km	MPC · JPL
471849	2012 XQ_{143}	—	November 19, 2001	Socorro	LINEAR	TIR	2.6 km	MPC · JPL
471850	2012 XV_{144}	—	November 18, 2007	Mount Lemmon	Mount Lemmon Survey	·	2.5 km	MPC · JPL
471851	2012 XK_{147}	—	December 4, 2007	Mount Lemmon	Mount Lemmon Survey	EOS	1.7 km	MPC · JPL
471852	2012 XX_{152}	—	October 13, 1998	Kitt Peak	Spacewatch	·	1.4 km	MPC · JPL
471853	2012 XD_{154}	—	December 23, 2006	Mount Lemmon	Mount Lemmon Survey	·	3.5 km	MPC · JPL
471854	2012 YQ_{2}	—	December 3, 2007	Kitt Peak	Spacewatch	·	2.1 km	MPC · JPL
471855	2013 AV_{3}	—	October 20, 2012	Mount Lemmon	Mount Lemmon Survey	·	2.2 km	MPC · JPL
471856	2013 AL_{4}	—	December 18, 2001	Socorro	LINEAR	EOS	2.3 km	MPC · JPL
471857	2013 AS_{5}	—	September 10, 2007	Catalina	CSS	·	1.6 km	MPC · JPL
471858	2013 AS_{7}	—	December 26, 2006	Kitt Peak	Spacewatch	·	4.0 km	MPC · JPL
471859	2013 AY_{8}	—	May 1, 2010	WISE	WISE	·	4.7 km	MPC · JPL
471860	2013 AM_{9}	—	November 19, 2012	Kitt Peak	Spacewatch	·	3.8 km	MPC · JPL
471861	2013 AP_{11}	—	December 8, 2012	Kitt Peak	Spacewatch	·	3.0 km	MPC · JPL
471862	2013 AU_{11}	—	August 21, 2006	Kitt Peak	Spacewatch	·	1.4 km	MPC · JPL
471863	2013 AH_{17}	—	October 18, 2011	Catalina	CSS	·	3.6 km	MPC · JPL
471864	2013 AY_{28}	—	October 16, 2011	Siding Spring	SSS	·	2.8 km	MPC · JPL
471865	2013 AH_{29}	—	November 8, 2007	Mount Lemmon	Mount Lemmon Survey	·	2.0 km	MPC · JPL
471866	2013 AO_{30}	—	January 7, 2013	Kitt Peak	Spacewatch	H	540 m	MPC · JPL
471867	2013 AF_{32}	—	December 21, 2012	Mount Lemmon	Mount Lemmon Survey	·	3.0 km	MPC · JPL
471868	2013 AA_{36}	—	June 17, 2005	Mount Lemmon	Mount Lemmon Survey	·	3.0 km	MPC · JPL
471869	2013 AD_{38}	—	August 28, 2005	Kitt Peak	Spacewatch	·	3.0 km	MPC · JPL
471870	2013 AN_{38}	—	September 29, 2011	Mount Lemmon	Mount Lemmon Survey	·	2.5 km	MPC · JPL
471871	2013 AP_{41}	—	May 17, 2009	Kitt Peak	Spacewatch	VER	2.8 km	MPC · JPL
471872	2013 AR_{50}	—	January 8, 2013	Mount Lemmon	Mount Lemmon Survey	H	700 m	MPC · JPL
471873	2013 AQ_{52}	—	January 20, 2008	Kitt Peak	Spacewatch	EOS	1.7 km	MPC · JPL
471874	2013 AZ_{53}	—	July 24, 2000	Kitt Peak	Spacewatch	·	2.7 km	MPC · JPL
471875	2013 AV_{58}	—	January 20, 2008	Mount Lemmon	Mount Lemmon Survey	·	2.2 km	MPC · JPL
471876	2013 AF_{59}	—	January 15, 2008	Mount Lemmon	Mount Lemmon Survey	·	2.3 km	MPC · JPL
471877	2013 AY_{73}	—	October 20, 2006	Mount Lemmon	Mount Lemmon Survey	EOS	1.8 km	MPC · JPL
471878	2013 AF_{91}	—	December 19, 2003	Socorro	LINEAR	·	1.7 km	MPC · JPL
471879	2013 AE_{96}	—	January 31, 2008	Mount Lemmon	Mount Lemmon Survey	·	3.7 km	MPC · JPL
471880	2013 AO_{97}	—	September 3, 2010	Mount Lemmon	Mount Lemmon Survey	CYB	3.4 km	MPC · JPL
471881	2013 AZ_{98}	—	February 24, 2008	Mount Lemmon	Mount Lemmon Survey	·	2.6 km	MPC · JPL
471882	2013 AG_{102}	—	September 30, 2006	Kitt Peak	Spacewatch	·	2.1 km	MPC · JPL
471883	2013 AS_{111}	—	December 17, 2006	Mount Lemmon	Mount Lemmon Survey	·	2.2 km	MPC · JPL
471884	2013 AF_{112}	—	December 9, 2012	Mount Lemmon	Mount Lemmon Survey	L4	7.9 km	MPC · JPL
471885	2013 AD_{115}	—	February 3, 2008	Kitt Peak	Spacewatch	·	2.7 km	MPC · JPL
471886	2013 AO_{116}	—	October 20, 2012	Mount Lemmon	Mount Lemmon Survey	·	3.5 km	MPC · JPL
471887	2013 AO_{119}	—	June 19, 2010	Mount Lemmon	Mount Lemmon Survey	VER	2.9 km	MPC · JPL
471888	2013 AZ_{122}	—	March 9, 2008	Mount Lemmon	Mount Lemmon Survey	·	2.9 km	MPC · JPL
471889	2013 AC_{126}	—	October 29, 2006	Catalina	CSS	TIR	3.4 km	MPC · JPL
471890	2013 AR_{130}	—	November 16, 2006	Mount Lemmon	Mount Lemmon Survey	·	3.3 km	MPC · JPL
471891	2013 AU_{161}	—	September 30, 2002	Socorro	LINEAR	·	1.6 km	MPC · JPL
471892	2013 AY_{162}	—	April 14, 2010	WISE	WISE	·	3.3 km	MPC · JPL
471893	2013 AK_{170}	—	October 2, 2006	Mount Lemmon	Mount Lemmon Survey	·	1.7 km	MPC · JPL
471894	2013 AZ_{170}	—	August 29, 2005	Kitt Peak	Spacewatch	·	2.9 km	MPC · JPL
471895	2013 AP_{173}	—	August 28, 2005	Kitt Peak	Spacewatch	·	2.7 km	MPC · JPL
471896	2013 AO_{174}	—	November 17, 2006	Catalina	CSS	·	3.0 km	MPC · JPL
471897	2013 BC_{8}	—	February 6, 2002	Kitt Peak	Spacewatch	·	2.9 km	MPC · JPL
471898	2013 BJ_{25}	—	January 5, 2013	Mount Lemmon	Mount Lemmon Survey	CYB	4.0 km	MPC · JPL
471899	2013 BL_{31}	—	January 10, 2008	Mount Lemmon	Mount Lemmon Survey	·	2.7 km	MPC · JPL
471900	2013 BY_{34}	—	July 3, 2005	Mount Lemmon	Mount Lemmon Survey	EOS	2.2 km	MPC · JPL

== 471901–472000 ==
back to top

Designation			Discovery			Properties		Ref
Permanent	Provisional	Named after	Date	Site	Discoverer(s)	Category	Diam.	Ref
471901	2013 BR_{38}	—	October 19, 2006	Catalina	CSS	·	2.1 km	MPC · JPL
471902	2013 BL_{62}	—	January 27, 2007	Mount Lemmon	Mount Lemmon Survey	·	2.6 km	MPC · JPL
471903	2013 BC_{72}	—	January 12, 2002	Kitt Peak	Spacewatch	·	3.3 km	MPC · JPL
471904	2013 CF_{11}	—	January 19, 2013	Kitt Peak	Spacewatch	L4	7.6 km	MPC · JPL
471905	2013 CX_{31}	—	October 28, 2005	Catalina	CSS	·	700 m	MPC · JPL
471906	2013 CJ_{51}	—	September 10, 2005	Anderson Mesa	LONEOS	·	3.5 km	MPC · JPL
471907	2013 CS_{61}	—	November 2, 2010	Mount Lemmon	Mount Lemmon Survey	L4	8.7 km	MPC · JPL
471908	2013 CD_{87}	—	September 1, 2005	Kitt Peak	Spacewatch	T_{j} (2.97)	3.2 km	MPC · JPL
471909	2013 CR_{109}	—	September 28, 2006	Kitt Peak	Spacewatch	·	1.8 km	MPC · JPL
471910	2013 CA_{116}	—	September 1, 2005	Kitt Peak	Spacewatch	·	2.7 km	MPC · JPL
471911	2013 CK_{192}	—	January 4, 2013	Mount Lemmon	Mount Lemmon Survey	·	3.1 km	MPC · JPL
471912	2013 CW_{193}	—	March 28, 2008	Mount Lemmon	Mount Lemmon Survey	·	3.3 km	MPC · JPL
471913	2013 CM_{200}	—	August 30, 2005	Kitt Peak	Spacewatch	·	2.2 km	MPC · JPL
471914	2013 CS_{200}	—	February 10, 2007	Mount Lemmon	Mount Lemmon Survey	·	2.7 km	MPC · JPL
471915	2013 CZ_{201}	—	September 1, 2005	Kitt Peak	Spacewatch	·	2.2 km	MPC · JPL
471916	2013 DS	—	January 7, 2013	Catalina	CSS	H	640 m	MPC · JPL
471917	2013 DT_{1}	—	November 15, 2006	Mount Lemmon	Mount Lemmon Survey	·	3.1 km	MPC · JPL
471918	2013 DY_{2}	—	October 20, 2006	Catalina	CSS	·	2.4 km	MPC · JPL
471919	2013 EE_{1}	—	September 3, 2000	Socorro	LINEAR	·	3.2 km	MPC · JPL
471920	2013 EC_{90}	—	October 30, 2006	Mount Lemmon	Mount Lemmon Survey	·	5.1 km	MPC · JPL
471921	2013 FC_{28}	—	March 17, 2013	Cerro Tololo	S. S. Sheppard, C. A. Trujillo	cubewano (hot)	379 km	MPC · JPL
471922	2013 GO_{80}	—	June 10, 2011	Mount Lemmon	Mount Lemmon Survey	H	630 m	MPC · JPL
471923	2013 GW_{131}	—	December 20, 2004	Mount Lemmon	Mount Lemmon Survey	H	540 m	MPC · JPL
471924	2013 HU_{10}	—	December 23, 2006	Mount Lemmon	Mount Lemmon Survey	H	690 m	MPC · JPL
471925	2013 JB_{34}	—	November 16, 2006	Catalina	CSS	H	640 m	MPC · JPL
471926 Jörmungandr	2013 KN_{6}	Jörmungandr	May 28, 2013	Haute Provence	J. Jahn	APO	670 m	MPC · JPL
471927	2013 KY_{13}	—	November 1, 2006	Mount Lemmon	Mount Lemmon Survey	H	460 m	MPC · JPL
471928	2013 LG_{9}	—	January 27, 2007	Mount Lemmon	Mount Lemmon Survey	H	510 m	MPC · JPL
471929	2013 PT_{1}	—	October 18, 2007	Mount Lemmon	Mount Lemmon Survey	·	620 m	MPC · JPL
471930	2013 PA_{33}	—	August 7, 2013	Kitt Peak	Spacewatch	·	630 m	MPC · JPL
471931	2013 PH_{44}	—	August 12, 2013	Haleakala	Pan-STARRS 1	centaur	80 km	MPC · JPL
471932	2013 PY_{45}	—	September 18, 2007	Mount Lemmon	Mount Lemmon Survey	·	870 m	MPC · JPL
471933	2013 QC_{8}	—	March 22, 2012	Mount Lemmon	Mount Lemmon Survey	·	660 m	MPC · JPL
471934	2013 QG_{13}	—	December 11, 2004	Kitt Peak	Spacewatch	·	3.6 km	MPC · JPL
471935	2013 QB_{29}	—	October 4, 2007	Kitt Peak	Spacewatch	·	760 m	MPC · JPL
471936	2013 QL_{63}	—	October 10, 2010	Mount Lemmon	Mount Lemmon Survey	·	620 m	MPC · JPL
471937	2013 QQ_{84}	—	September 2, 2003	Socorro	LINEAR	·	770 m	MPC · JPL
471938	2013 RM_{4}	—	August 15, 2009	Catalina	CSS	·	1.2 km	MPC · JPL
471939	2013 RX_{23}	—	January 31, 2008	Mount Lemmon	Mount Lemmon Survey	·	650 m	MPC · JPL
471940	2013 RY_{27}	—	March 24, 2012	Mount Lemmon	Mount Lemmon Survey	PHO	700 m	MPC · JPL
471941	2013 RJ_{28}	—	September 4, 2013	Mount Lemmon	Mount Lemmon Survey	·	1.0 km	MPC · JPL
471942	2013 RT_{28}	—	September 11, 2010	Mount Lemmon	Mount Lemmon Survey	·	690 m	MPC · JPL
471943	2013 RO_{33}	—	February 25, 2006	Kitt Peak	Spacewatch	·	660 m	MPC · JPL
471944	2013 RV_{34}	—	November 20, 2006	Kitt Peak	Spacewatch	V	530 m	MPC · JPL
471945	2013 RK_{49}	—	October 17, 2010	Mount Lemmon	Mount Lemmon Survey	·	610 m	MPC · JPL
471946	2013 RO_{51}	—	December 19, 2003	Socorro	LINEAR	·	620 m	MPC · JPL
471947	2013 RE_{53}	—	April 14, 2008	Mount Lemmon	Mount Lemmon Survey	V	680 m	MPC · JPL
471948	2013 RC_{65}	—	November 15, 2006	Catalina	CSS	V	750 m	MPC · JPL
471949	2013 RH_{72}	—	February 10, 2002	Kitt Peak	Spacewatch	·	690 m	MPC · JPL
471950	2013 RV_{84}	—	January 11, 2008	Kitt Peak	Spacewatch	·	440 m	MPC · JPL
471951	2013 RJ_{92}	—	September 5, 2013	Kitt Peak	Spacewatch	·	570 m	MPC · JPL
471952	2013 RF_{94}	—	March 13, 2007	Catalina	CSS	EUN	1.6 km	MPC · JPL
471953	2013 RR_{97}	—	December 3, 2007	Kitt Peak	Spacewatch	·	700 m	MPC · JPL
471954	2013 RM_{98}	—	September 8, 2013	Cerro Tololo	DECam	cubewano (hot)	120 km	MPC · JPL
471955	2013 SR_{15}	—	March 25, 2006	Kitt Peak	Spacewatch	·	560 m	MPC · JPL
471956	2013 SC_{25}	—	September 29, 2013	Haleakala	Pan-STARRS 1	APO	500 m	MPC · JPL
471957	2013 SB_{45}	—	October 28, 2010	Mount Lemmon	Mount Lemmon Survey	·	560 m	MPC · JPL
471958	2013 SH_{49}	—	September 28, 2013	Mount Lemmon	Mount Lemmon Survey	·	1.1 km	MPC · JPL
471959	2013 SR_{54}	—	October 13, 2010	Mount Lemmon	Mount Lemmon Survey	·	540 m	MPC · JPL
471960	2013 SQ_{65}	—	February 27, 2012	Kitt Peak	Spacewatch	·	590 m	MPC · JPL
471961	2013 TQ_{9}	—	December 15, 2009	Catalina	CSS	·	1.6 km	MPC · JPL
471962	2013 TV_{11}	—	November 14, 2007	Kitt Peak	Spacewatch	·	650 m	MPC · JPL
471963	2013 TC_{18}	—	September 26, 2006	Kitt Peak	Spacewatch	·	720 m	MPC · JPL
471964	2013 TQ_{34}	—	January 8, 2011	Mount Lemmon	Mount Lemmon Survey	·	650 m	MPC · JPL
471965	2013 TU_{34}	—	April 18, 2009	Kitt Peak	Spacewatch	·	540 m	MPC · JPL
471966	2013 TD_{47}	—	January 14, 2008	Kitt Peak	Spacewatch	·	600 m	MPC · JPL
471967	2013 TO_{57}	—	October 2, 2003	Kitt Peak	Spacewatch	·	620 m	MPC · JPL
471968	2013 TF_{62}	—	August 21, 2003	Campo Imperatore	CINEOS	·	550 m	MPC · JPL
471969	2013 TW_{63}	—	September 19, 2006	Kitt Peak	Spacewatch	·	650 m	MPC · JPL
471970	2013 TW_{69}	—	October 16, 2006	Kitt Peak	Spacewatch	·	790 m	MPC · JPL
471971	2013 TW_{72}	—	December 30, 2007	Mount Lemmon	Mount Lemmon Survey	·	640 m	MPC · JPL
471972	2013 TF_{86}	—	September 6, 2013	Mount Lemmon	Mount Lemmon Survey	·	520 m	MPC · JPL
471973	2013 TJ_{99}	—	December 19, 2003	Kitt Peak	Spacewatch	V	760 m	MPC · JPL
471974	2013 TF_{100}	—	February 28, 2008	Mount Lemmon	Mount Lemmon Survey	·	650 m	MPC · JPL
471975	2013 TZ_{103}	—	August 28, 2006	Kitt Peak	Spacewatch	·	570 m	MPC · JPL
471976	2013 TW_{110}	—	October 3, 2013	Kitt Peak	Spacewatch	V	660 m	MPC · JPL
471977	2013 TP_{111}	—	October 25, 2003	Socorro	LINEAR	·	560 m	MPC · JPL
471978	2013 TU_{111}	—	August 18, 2009	Kitt Peak	Spacewatch	NYS	1.0 km	MPC · JPL
471979	2013 TC_{113}	—	March 14, 2005	Mount Lemmon	Mount Lemmon Survey	NYS	940 m	MPC · JPL
471980	2013 TP_{115}	—	September 22, 2003	Kitt Peak	Spacewatch	·	580 m	MPC · JPL
471981	2013 TD_{116}	—	July 27, 2009	Catalina	CSS	·	1.2 km	MPC · JPL
471982	2013 TZ_{141}	—	November 1, 2010	Kitt Peak	Spacewatch	·	550 m	MPC · JPL
471983	2013 TG_{143}	—	March 5, 2008	Mount Lemmon	Mount Lemmon Survey	·	660 m	MPC · JPL
471984	2013 UE_{3}	—	October 24, 2013	Mount Lemmon	Mount Lemmon Survey	APO · critical	100 m	MPC · JPL
471985	2013 UJ_{7}	—	October 3, 2006	Mount Lemmon	Mount Lemmon Survey	·	700 m	MPC · JPL
471986	2013 UA_{10}	—	October 17, 2006	Catalina	CSS	·	900 m	MPC · JPL
471987	2013 VK_{3}	—	September 21, 2000	Kitt Peak	Spacewatch	·	660 m	MPC · JPL
471988	2013 VL_{8}	—	November 1, 2013	Mount Lemmon	Mount Lemmon Survey	·	1.1 km	MPC · JPL
471989	2013 VT_{8}	—	December 17, 2003	Kitt Peak	Spacewatch	·	580 m	MPC · JPL
471990	2013 VQ_{10}	—	March 13, 2010	WISE	WISE	·	2.8 km	MPC · JPL
471991	2013 VZ_{20}	—	December 14, 2007	Mount Lemmon	Mount Lemmon Survey	·	820 m	MPC · JPL
471992	2013 WK_{1}	—	November 17, 2006	Mount Lemmon	Mount Lemmon Survey	·	1.0 km	MPC · JPL
471993	2013 WB_{2}	—	September 8, 1996	Kitt Peak	Spacewatch	·	560 m	MPC · JPL
471994	2013 WS_{7}	—	October 14, 2013	Mount Lemmon	Mount Lemmon Survey	MAR	1.5 km	MPC · JPL
471995	2013 WC_{10}	—	February 13, 2011	Mount Lemmon	Mount Lemmon Survey	·	570 m	MPC · JPL
471996	2013 WL_{10}	—	September 20, 2006	Catalina	CSS	(2076)	610 m	MPC · JPL
471997	2013 WF_{13}	—	November 11, 2006	Catalina	CSS	·	650 m	MPC · JPL
471998	2013 WO_{25}	—	April 20, 2012	Mount Lemmon	Mount Lemmon Survey	·	580 m	MPC · JPL
471999	2013 WE_{27}	—	December 18, 2007	Mount Lemmon	Mount Lemmon Survey	·	860 m	MPC · JPL
472000	2013 WG_{30}	—	October 31, 2006	Mount Lemmon	Mount Lemmon Survey	·	540 m	MPC · JPL

back to top

== Meaning of names ==
As minor planet discoveries are confirmed, they are given a permanent number by the IAU's Minor Planet Center (MPC), and the discoverers can then submit names for them, following the IAU's naming conventions. The list below concerns those minor planets in the specified number-range that have received names, and explains the meanings of those names.

Official naming citations of newly named small Solar System bodies are approved and published in a bulletin by IAU's Working Group for Small Bodies Nomenclature (WGSBN). Before May 2021, citations were published in MPC's Minor Planet Circulars for many decades. Recent citations can also be found on the JPL Small-Body Database (SBDB). Until his death in 2016, German astronomer Lutz D. Schmadel compiled these citations into the Dictionary of Minor Planet Names (DMP) and regularly updated the collection.

Based on Paul Herget's The Names of the Minor Planets, Schmadel also researched the unclear origin of numerous asteroids, most of which had been named prior to World War II. This article incorporates text from this source, which is in the public domain: SBDB New namings may only be added to this list below after official publication as the preannouncement of names is condemned. The WGSBN publishes a comprehensive guideline for the naming rules of non-cometary small Solar System bodies.

Named minor planet	Provisional	This minor planet was named for...	Ref · Catalog
471109 Vladobahýl	2010 CO_{12}	Vladimír Bahýl (born 1948), Associate Professor Emeritus at the Technical University in Zvolen, constructed a computed tomography scanner used in dendrology. As an amateur astronomer he is a dedicated observer of variable stars, asteroids and meteors.	JPL · 471109
471143 Dziewanna	2010 EK_{139}	Devana (Dziewanna), is a Slavic goddess of the wild nature, forests and the hunt.	JPL · 471143
471301 Robertajmolson	2011 HS_{20}	Roberta J. M. Olson (born 1947), an American art historian, curator, and author, who first identified Halley's Comet as a template for the Star of Bethlehem in Giotto's Adoration of the Magi, which in turn inspired the European Space Agency to name its Giotto spacecraft which studied Halley's Comet after the Italian Renaissance painter.	IAU · 471301
471325 Taowu	2011 KT_{19}	One of the Four Perils of Chinese mythology, Taowu is a ferocious and stubborn beast said to lurk within the western regions of China. It is depicted as having a human head, tiger legs, boar tusks, and a long tail.	IAU · 471325
471926 Jörmungandr	2013 KN_{6}	Jörmungandr was a sea serpent in Norse mythology. The serpent was so large that it surrounded the earth and grasped its own tail; when it moved in the ocean, it caused huge storm surges.	JPL · 471926
