= (471288) 2011 GM27 =

Kuiper belt object

(471288) 2011 GM_{27}
Discovery
- Discovery site: La Silla Obs. (809)
- Discovery date: 2 April 2011

Designations
- Minor planet category: TNO · res 4:7?

Orbital characteristics
- Epoch 1 July 2021 (JD 2459396.5)
- Uncertainty parameter 2
- Observation arc: 14.08 yr (5,141 d)
- Aphelion: 44.638 AU
- Perihelion: 42.363 AU
- Semi-major axis: 43.500 AU
- Eccentricity: 0.0261
- Orbital period (sidereal): 286.91 yr (104,794 d)
- Mean anomaly: 98.325°
- Mean motion: 0° 0^{m} 12.24^{s} / day
- Inclination: 13.028°
- Longitude of ascending node: 257.25°
- Argument of perihelion: 194.69°
- Known satellites: 0

Physical characteristics
- Mean diameter: 443 km (est.); 460 km (est.)
- Geometric albedo: 0.06 (est.); 0.09 (est.)
- Absolute magnitude (H): 5.32

(471288) 2011 GM_{27} is a resonant trans-Neptunian object (TNO) in the Kuiper belt. It was discovered on 2 April 2011, at ESO's La Silla Observatory in Chile. With an absolute magnitude of 5.32, a geometric albedo of between 0.06 and 0.09 (a typical value) would mean it has a diameter of about 450 kilometers (280 mi).

2011 GM_{27} orbits the Sun at a distance of 42.4–44.6 AU once every 286 years and 11 months (104,794 days; semi-major axis of 43.5 AU). Its orbit has an eccentricity of 0.03 and an inclination of 13° with respect to the ecliptic.

It orbits slightly outside a 3:5 resonance with Neptune, taking 16 years (5.5% of its orbit) longer to orbit the Sun than a body in 3:5 resonance. Precovery observations exist dating back to 2006 in SDSS data.
