= List of minor planets: 445001–446000 =

The following is a partial list of minor planets, running from minor-planet number 445001 through 446000, inclusive. The primary data for this and other partial lists is based on JPL's "Small-Body Orbital Elements" and data available from the Minor Planet Center. Critical list information is also provided by the MPC, unless otherwise specified from Lowell Observatory. A detailed description of the table's columns and additional sources are given on the main page including a complete list of every page in this series, and a statistical break-up on the dynamical classification of minor planets.

Also see the summary list of all named bodies in numerical and alphabetical order, and the corresponding naming citations for the number range of this particular list. New namings may only be added to this list after official publication, as the preannouncement of names is condemned by the Working Group for Small Bodies Nomenclature of the International Astronomical Union.

Near-Earth obj.	MBA (inner)	MBA (outer)	Centaur
Mars-crosser	MBA (middle)	Jupiter trojan	Trans-Neptunian obj.
Unclassified

== 445001–445100 ==
Designation			Discovery			Properties		Ref
Permanent	Provisional	Named after	Date	Site	Discoverer(s)	Category	Diam.	Ref
445001	2008 GT_{106}	—	April 12, 2008	Kitt Peak	Spacewatch	THM	2.9 km	MPC; JPL
445002	2008 GV_{113}	—	April 9, 2008	Kitt Peak	Spacewatch	·	1.7 km	MPC; JPL
445003	2008 GZ_{119}	—	February 29, 2008	Kitt Peak	Spacewatch	·	3.0 km	MPC; JPL
445004	2008 GX_{123}	—	March 15, 2008	Kitt Peak	Spacewatch	·	1.7 km	MPC; JPL
445005	2008 GA_{130}	—	April 4, 2008	Catalina	CSS	·	2.5 km	MPC; JPL
445006	2008 GQ_{137}	—	April 6, 2008	Kitt Peak	Spacewatch	·	3.6 km	MPC; JPL
445007	2008 HQ	—	November 5, 2005	Kitt Peak	Spacewatch	·	2.1 km	MPC; JPL
445008	2008 HJ_{2}	—	April 25, 2008	Dauban	Kugel, F.	·	3.5 km	MPC; JPL
445009	2008 HD_{11}	—	April 3, 2008	Kitt Peak	Spacewatch	·	2.4 km	MPC; JPL
445010	2008 HE_{18}	—	March 30, 2008	Kitt Peak	Spacewatch	·	2.7 km	MPC; JPL
445011	2008 HS_{20}	—	April 26, 2008	Mount Lemmon	Mount Lemmon Survey	EOS	3.5 km	MPC; JPL
445012	2008 HJ_{26}	—	March 15, 2007	Mount Lemmon	Mount Lemmon Survey	·	2.4 km	MPC; JPL
445013	2008 HC_{37}	—	April 5, 2008	Kitt Peak	Spacewatch	EOS	1.9 km	MPC; JPL
445014	2008 HE_{41}	—	April 26, 2008	Mount Lemmon	Mount Lemmon Survey	·	2.2 km	MPC; JPL
445015	2008 HK_{51}	—	April 29, 2008	Kitt Peak	Spacewatch	·	3.0 km	MPC; JPL
445016	2008 HO_{60}	—	April 15, 2008	Mount Lemmon	Mount Lemmon Survey	·	2.7 km	MPC; JPL
445017	2008 HB_{65}	—	April 29, 2008	Kitt Peak	Spacewatch	·	4.3 km	MPC; JPL
445018	2008 JJ_{24}	—	January 5, 2000	Kitt Peak	Spacewatch	·	5.1 km	MPC; JPL
445019	2008 JG_{31}	—	March 30, 2008	Kitt Peak	Spacewatch	·	610 m	MPC; JPL
445020	2008 KB_{30}	—	May 29, 2008	Kitt Peak	Spacewatch	·	3.5 km	MPC; JPL
445021	2008 KK_{31}	—	April 30, 2008	Kitt Peak	Spacewatch	·	2.8 km	MPC; JPL
445022	2008 KE_{39}	—	May 30, 2008	Kitt Peak	Spacewatch	·	3.9 km	MPC; JPL
445023	2008 LN_{11}	—	April 24, 2008	Kitt Peak	Spacewatch	·	3.8 km	MPC; JPL
445024	2008 NT	—	July 1, 2008	Kitt Peak	Spacewatch	·	740 m	MPC; JPL
445025	2008 NS_{1}	—	July 5, 2008	Siding Spring	SSS	T_{j} (2.94) · APO +1km	2.1 km	MPC; JPL
445026	2008 OX_{3}	—	July 25, 2008	Siding Spring	SSS	·	920 m	MPC; JPL
445027	2008 PO_{8}	—	July 30, 2008	Mount Lemmon	Mount Lemmon Survey	·	760 m	MPC; JPL
445028	2008 PD_{20}	—	August 7, 2008	Kitt Peak	Spacewatch	·	550 m	MPC; JPL
445029	2008 QT_{9}	—	August 21, 2008	Kitt Peak	Spacewatch	·	700 m	MPC; JPL
445030	2008 QS_{37}	—	August 21, 2008	Kitt Peak	Spacewatch	·	850 m	MPC; JPL
445031	2008 QS_{39}	—	August 24, 2008	Kitt Peak	Spacewatch	·	780 m	MPC; JPL
445032	2008 RT_{14}	—	August 24, 2008	Kitt Peak	Spacewatch	·	720 m	MPC; JPL
445033	2008 RJ_{24}	—	September 5, 2008	Socorro	LINEAR	V	680 m	MPC; JPL
445034	2008 RQ_{29}	—	September 2, 2008	Kitt Peak	Spacewatch	·	640 m	MPC; JPL
445035	2008 RG_{42}	—	September 2, 2008	Kitt Peak	Spacewatch	·	750 m	MPC; JPL
445036	2008 RR_{87}	—	September 5, 2008	Kitt Peak	Spacewatch	·	980 m	MPC; JPL
445037	2008 RA_{101}	—	September 5, 2008	Kitt Peak	Spacewatch	·	820 m	MPC; JPL
445038	2008 RL_{106}	—	September 7, 2008	Mount Lemmon	Mount Lemmon Survey	·	790 m	MPC; JPL
445039	2008 RX_{115}	—	September 7, 2008	Mount Lemmon	Mount Lemmon Survey	·	860 m	MPC; JPL
445040	2008 RA_{119}	—	September 2, 2008	Kitt Peak	Spacewatch	·	780 m	MPC; JPL
445041	2008 RY_{128}	—	March 11, 2000	Socorro	LINEAR	·	1.0 km	MPC; JPL
445042	2008 RZ_{139}	—	September 7, 2008	Catalina	CSS	·	740 m	MPC; JPL
445043	2008 RM_{141}	—	September 4, 2008	Socorro	LINEAR	·	800 m	MPC; JPL
445044	2008 RY_{145}	—	September 4, 2008	Kitt Peak	Spacewatch	V	670 m	MPC; JPL
445045	2008 SO_{27}	—	September 19, 2008	Kitt Peak	Spacewatch	MAS	610 m	MPC; JPL
445046	2008 SL_{28}	—	September 19, 2008	Kitt Peak	Spacewatch	·	1.0 km	MPC; JPL
445047	2008 SP_{44}	—	September 20, 2008	Kitt Peak	Spacewatch	V	550 m	MPC; JPL
445048	2008 SK_{47}	—	September 7, 2008	Mount Lemmon	Mount Lemmon Survey	·	880 m	MPC; JPL
445049	2008 SZ_{52}	—	September 20, 2008	Mount Lemmon	Mount Lemmon Survey	MAS	660 m	MPC; JPL
445050	2008 SG_{56}	—	September 20, 2008	Kitt Peak	Spacewatch	MAS	610 m	MPC; JPL
445051	2008 SZ_{62}	—	September 21, 2008	Kitt Peak	Spacewatch	NYS	800 m	MPC; JPL
445052	2008 SW_{68}	—	September 22, 2008	Kitt Peak	Spacewatch	·	660 m	MPC; JPL
445053	2008 SM_{92}	—	September 9, 2008	Mount Lemmon	Mount Lemmon Survey	·	870 m	MPC; JPL
445054	2008 SG_{99}	—	November 20, 2001	Socorro	LINEAR	·	690 m	MPC; JPL
445055	2008 SV_{123}	—	September 22, 2008	Mount Lemmon	Mount Lemmon Survey	·	1.2 km	MPC; JPL
445056	2008 ST_{132}	—	September 22, 2008	Kitt Peak	Spacewatch	NYS	1.1 km	MPC; JPL
445057	2008 SL_{139}	—	September 6, 2008	Catalina	CSS	·	740 m	MPC; JPL
445058	2008 SO_{195}	—	September 25, 2008	Kitt Peak	Spacewatch	MAS	590 m	MPC; JPL
445059	2008 SK_{198}	—	August 20, 2004	Kitt Peak	Spacewatch	·	1.1 km	MPC; JPL
445060	2008 SE_{202}	—	September 22, 2008	Kitt Peak	Spacewatch	·	940 m	MPC; JPL
445061	2008 SH_{202}	—	September 26, 2008	Kitt Peak	Spacewatch	·	890 m	MPC; JPL
445062	2008 SO_{202}	—	September 7, 2008	Mount Lemmon	Mount Lemmon Survey	·	850 m	MPC; JPL
445063	2008 SS_{204}	—	September 26, 2008	Kitt Peak	Spacewatch	·	1.1 km	MPC; JPL
445064	2008 SF_{205}	—	September 26, 2008	Kitt Peak	Spacewatch	·	1.2 km	MPC; JPL
445065	2008 SO_{232}	—	April 7, 2005	Mount Lemmon	Mount Lemmon Survey	3:2	6.5 km	MPC; JPL
445066	2008 SD_{242}	—	September 29, 2008	Catalina	CSS	NYS	610 m	MPC; JPL
445067	2008 SA_{267}	—	September 22, 2008	Mount Lemmon	Mount Lemmon Survey	·	1.2 km	MPC; JPL
445068	2008 SE_{268}	—	September 24, 2008	Kitt Peak	Spacewatch	3:2 · SHU	4.7 km	MPC; JPL
445069	2008 SD_{285}	—	September 28, 2008	Mount Lemmon	Mount Lemmon Survey	·	950 m	MPC; JPL
445070	2008 SE_{288}	—	September 23, 2008	Kitt Peak	Spacewatch	NYS	1.0 km	MPC; JPL
445071	2008 SP_{297}	—	September 20, 2008	Catalina	CSS	·	840 m	MPC; JPL
445072	2008 SQ_{299}	—	September 22, 2008	Kitt Peak	Spacewatch	MAS	690 m	MPC; JPL
445073	2008 SE_{300}	—	September 22, 2008	Kitt Peak	Spacewatch	·	750 m	MPC; JPL
445074	2008 TE_{16}	—	October 1, 2008	Mount Lemmon	Mount Lemmon Survey	NYS	910 m	MPC; JPL
445075	2008 TB_{18}	—	October 1, 2008	Mount Lemmon	Mount Lemmon Survey	·	780 m	MPC; JPL
445076	2008 TP_{18}	—	October 1, 2008	Mount Lemmon	Mount Lemmon Survey	·	950 m	MPC; JPL
445077	2008 TJ_{27}	—	October 1, 2008	La Sagra	OAM	NYS	730 m	MPC; JPL
445078	2008 TD_{39}	—	October 1, 2008	Kitt Peak	Spacewatch	NYS	840 m	MPC; JPL
445079	2008 TQ_{42}	—	October 1, 2008	Mount Lemmon	Mount Lemmon Survey	·	850 m	MPC; JPL
445080	2008 TY_{43}	—	October 1, 2008	Mount Lemmon	Mount Lemmon Survey	·	1.1 km	MPC; JPL
445081	2008 TL_{55}	—	October 2, 2008	Kitt Peak	Spacewatch	V	720 m	MPC; JPL
445082	2008 TJ_{74}	—	October 2, 2008	Kitt Peak	Spacewatch	V	530 m	MPC; JPL
445083	2008 TV_{87}	—	September 21, 2008	Kitt Peak	Spacewatch	NYS	870 m	MPC; JPL
445084	2008 TY_{87}	—	September 25, 2008	Kitt Peak	Spacewatch	·	1.1 km	MPC; JPL
445085	2008 TR_{96}	—	September 4, 2008	Kitt Peak	Spacewatch	·	910 m	MPC; JPL
445086	2008 TF_{109}	—	October 6, 2008	Mount Lemmon	Mount Lemmon Survey	PHO	670 m	MPC; JPL
445087	2008 TQ_{110}	—	September 23, 2008	Catalina	CSS	·	960 m	MPC; JPL
445088	2008 TW_{121}	—	September 23, 2008	Catalina	CSS	·	930 m	MPC; JPL
445089	2008 TV_{136}	—	September 21, 2008	Kitt Peak	Spacewatch	·	980 m	MPC; JPL
445090	2008 TF_{146}	—	October 9, 2008	Mount Lemmon	Mount Lemmon Survey	MAS	540 m	MPC; JPL
445091	2008 TQ_{161}	—	October 6, 2008	Mount Lemmon	Mount Lemmon Survey	·	940 m	MPC; JPL
445092	2008 TV_{161}	—	October 8, 2008	Kitt Peak	Spacewatch	·	900 m	MPC; JPL
445093	2008 TL_{166}	—	October 7, 2008	Mount Lemmon	Mount Lemmon Survey	·	820 m	MPC; JPL
445094	2008 TM_{174}	—	October 6, 2008	Kitt Peak	Spacewatch	·	1.2 km	MPC; JPL
445095	2008 TG_{175}	—	October 8, 2008	Mount Lemmon	Mount Lemmon Survey	·	840 m	MPC; JPL
445096	2008 TS_{179}	—	December 25, 2005	Mount Lemmon	Mount Lemmon Survey	·	1.0 km	MPC; JPL
445097	2008 TU_{181}	—	October 1, 2008	Kitt Peak	Spacewatch	·	630 m	MPC; JPL
445098	2008 UQ_{40}	—	October 20, 2008	Kitt Peak	Spacewatch	MAS	610 m	MPC; JPL
445099	2008 UG_{42}	—	September 24, 2008	Mount Lemmon	Mount Lemmon Survey	·	940 m	MPC; JPL
445100	2008 UL_{45}	—	October 20, 2008	Mount Lemmon	Mount Lemmon Survey	MAS	700 m	MPC; JPL

== 445101–445200 ==
back to top

Designation			Discovery			Properties		Ref
Permanent	Provisional	Named after	Date	Site	Discoverer(s)	Category	Diam.	Ref
445101	2008 UR_{45}	—	October 20, 2008	Mount Lemmon	Mount Lemmon Survey	·	710 m	MPC; JPL
445102	2008 UO_{52}	—	October 20, 2008	Kitt Peak	Spacewatch	V	600 m	MPC; JPL
445103	2008 UO_{61}	—	October 21, 2008	Kitt Peak	Spacewatch	NYS	790 m	MPC; JPL
445104	2008 UR_{64}	—	October 21, 2008	Kitt Peak	Spacewatch	·	960 m	MPC; JPL
445105	2008 UE_{71}	—	October 21, 2008	Kitt Peak	Spacewatch	ERI	1.2 km	MPC; JPL
445106	2008 UE_{73}	—	October 21, 2008	Kitt Peak	Spacewatch	·	1.3 km	MPC; JPL
445107	2008 UU_{82}	—	October 22, 2008	Kitt Peak	Spacewatch	·	870 m	MPC; JPL
445108	2008 UU_{105}	—	October 21, 2008	Kitt Peak	Spacewatch	·	1.0 km	MPC; JPL
445109	2008 UW_{122}	—	October 22, 2008	Kitt Peak	Spacewatch	·	1.2 km	MPC; JPL
445110	2008 UB_{129}	—	October 9, 2008	Kitt Peak	Spacewatch	·	960 m	MPC; JPL
445111	2008 UL_{135}	—	September 6, 2008	Mount Lemmon	Mount Lemmon Survey	·	800 m	MPC; JPL
445112	2008 UM_{140}	—	October 23, 2008	Kitt Peak	Spacewatch	·	1.0 km	MPC; JPL
445113	2008 UZ_{151}	—	October 23, 2008	Mount Lemmon	Mount Lemmon Survey	·	960 m	MPC; JPL
445114	2008 UJ_{154}	—	October 23, 2008	Kitt Peak	Spacewatch	·	1.1 km	MPC; JPL
445115	2008 UB_{156}	—	October 23, 2008	Kitt Peak	Spacewatch	MAS	680 m	MPC; JPL
445116	2008 UK_{169}	—	October 24, 2008	Kitt Peak	Spacewatch	NYS	980 m	MPC; JPL
445117	2008 UQ_{181}	—	October 24, 2008	Mount Lemmon	Mount Lemmon Survey	·	1.4 km	MPC; JPL
445118	2008 UM_{197}	—	October 27, 2008	Mount Lemmon	Mount Lemmon Survey	·	850 m	MPC; JPL
445119	2008 UE_{210}	—	October 23, 2008	Kitt Peak	Spacewatch	3:2 · SHU	4.6 km	MPC; JPL
445120	2008 UL_{225}	—	October 25, 2008	Kitt Peak	Spacewatch	·	990 m	MPC; JPL
445121	2008 UL_{256}	—	October 27, 2008	Kitt Peak	Spacewatch	MAS	580 m	MPC; JPL
445122	2008 UN_{263}	—	October 27, 2008	Kitt Peak	Spacewatch	NYS	800 m	MPC; JPL
445123	2008 UQ_{263}	—	October 27, 2008	Kitt Peak	Spacewatch	MAS	640 m	MPC; JPL
445124	2008 UC_{268}	—	September 21, 2008	Mount Lemmon	Mount Lemmon Survey	NYS	910 m	MPC; JPL
445125	2008 UD_{286}	—	October 28, 2008	Mount Lemmon	Mount Lemmon Survey	3:2	8.5 km	MPC; JPL
445126	2008 UF_{300}	—	October 12, 2004	Kitt Peak	Spacewatch	CLA	1.8 km	MPC; JPL
445127	2008 UC_{323}	—	October 31, 2008	Kitt Peak	Spacewatch	·	1.1 km	MPC; JPL
445128	2008 UY_{356}	—	October 23, 2008	Kitt Peak	Spacewatch	·	1.0 km	MPC; JPL
445129	2008 VE_{20}	—	November 1, 2008	Mount Lemmon	Mount Lemmon Survey	·	770 m	MPC; JPL
445130	2008 VV_{39}	—	November 2, 2008	Kitt Peak	Spacewatch	·	1.3 km	MPC; JPL
445131	2008 VE_{46}	—	June 8, 2007	Kitt Peak	Spacewatch	V	600 m	MPC; JPL
445132	2008 VD_{64}	—	September 20, 2008	Mount Lemmon	Mount Lemmon Survey	·	1.2 km	MPC; JPL
445133	2008 WB_{3}	—	November 17, 2008	Kitt Peak	Spacewatch	V	700 m	MPC; JPL
445134	2008 WT_{3}	—	November 17, 2008	Kitt Peak	Spacewatch	·	2.1 km	MPC; JPL
445135	2008 WH_{5}	—	November 17, 2008	Kitt Peak	Spacewatch	MAS	560 m	MPC; JPL
445136	2008 WR_{5}	—	November 17, 2008	Kitt Peak	Spacewatch	NYS	950 m	MPC; JPL
445137	2008 WH_{12}	—	November 18, 2008	Catalina	CSS	·	990 m	MPC; JPL
445138	2008 WZ_{23}	—	November 18, 2008	Catalina	CSS	MAS	590 m	MPC; JPL
445139	2008 WD_{38}	—	September 8, 2004	Socorro	LINEAR	MAS	700 m	MPC; JPL
445140	2008 WR_{42}	—	November 17, 2008	Kitt Peak	Spacewatch	·	1.6 km	MPC; JPL
445141	2008 WO_{77}	—	November 20, 2008	Kitt Peak	Spacewatch	·	910 m	MPC; JPL
445142	2008 WY_{89}	—	November 22, 2008	Mount Lemmon	Mount Lemmon Survey	·	1.1 km	MPC; JPL
445143 Jordisavall	2008 WX_{94}	Jordisavall	November 26, 2008	Vicques	M. Ory	·	1.0 km	MPC; JPL
445144	2008 WL_{97}	—	October 30, 2008	Catalina	CSS	·	1.1 km	MPC; JPL
445145	2008 WG_{109}	—	November 30, 2008	Kitt Peak	Spacewatch	·	1.1 km	MPC; JPL
445146	2008 WZ_{129}	—	November 19, 2008	Mount Lemmon	Mount Lemmon Survey	·	820 m	MPC; JPL
445147	2008 WG_{130}	—	October 10, 2004	Kitt Peak	Spacewatch	MAS	580 m	MPC; JPL
445148	2008 WF_{133}	—	November 19, 2008	Kitt Peak	Spacewatch	·	980 m	MPC; JPL
445149	2008 WT_{135}	—	November 19, 2008	Kitt Peak	Spacewatch	·	1.1 km	MPC; JPL
445150	2008 WM_{139}	—	November 30, 2008	Socorro	LINEAR	·	1.7 km	MPC; JPL
445151	2008 XA_{3}	—	December 1, 2008	Dauban	Kugel, F.	·	970 m	MPC; JPL
445152	2008 XQ_{48}	—	December 4, 2008	Mount Lemmon	Mount Lemmon Survey	·	1.5 km	MPC; JPL
445153	2008 XY_{54}	—	December 5, 2008	Kitt Peak	Spacewatch	NYS	1.2 km	MPC; JPL
445154	2008 YW	—	December 17, 2008	Nazaret	Muler, G., Ruiz, J. M.	NYS	950 m	MPC; JPL
445155	2008 YS_{7}	—	December 21, 2008	La Sagra	OAM	·	1.3 km	MPC; JPL
445156 Cheeloomed	2008 YH_{31}	Cheeloomed	December 26, 2008	Weihai	University, Shandong	MAS	780 m	MPC; JPL
445157	2008 YW_{38}	—	January 7, 2005	Kitt Peak	Spacewatch	·	1.7 km	MPC; JPL
445158	2008 YT_{50}	—	December 29, 2008	Mount Lemmon	Mount Lemmon Survey	·	1.4 km	MPC; JPL
445159	2008 YT_{74}	—	December 30, 2008	Kitt Peak	Spacewatch	NYS	1.2 km	MPC; JPL
445160	2008 YP_{109}	—	November 19, 2008	Kitt Peak	Spacewatch	·	1.5 km	MPC; JPL
445161	2008 YU_{122}	—	August 10, 2007	Kitt Peak	Spacewatch	·	1.1 km	MPC; JPL
445162	2008 YM_{137}	—	December 22, 2008	Mount Lemmon	Mount Lemmon Survey	·	1.2 km	MPC; JPL
445163	2008 YY_{151}	—	December 22, 2008	Mount Lemmon	Mount Lemmon Survey	·	1.3 km	MPC; JPL
445164	2008 YF_{152}	—	December 22, 2008	Kitt Peak	Spacewatch	·	1.7 km	MPC; JPL
445165	2008 YD_{157}	—	December 22, 2008	Kitt Peak	Spacewatch	·	1.3 km	MPC; JPL
445166	2008 YO_{157}	—	December 21, 2008	Mount Lemmon	Mount Lemmon Survey	MAS	680 m	MPC; JPL
445167	2008 YQ_{171}	—	December 31, 2008	Kitt Peak	Spacewatch	·	1.3 km	MPC; JPL
445168	2009 AY_{17}	—	January 2, 2009	Kitt Peak	Spacewatch	·	1.2 km	MPC; JPL
445169	2009 AQ_{28}	—	January 8, 2009	Kitt Peak	Spacewatch	·	1.0 km	MPC; JPL
445170	2009 BJ_{24}	—	October 9, 2007	Kitt Peak	Spacewatch	·	1.4 km	MPC; JPL
445171	2009 BH_{27}	—	January 16, 2009	Kitt Peak	Spacewatch	·	1.1 km	MPC; JPL
445172	2009 BM_{41}	—	January 16, 2009	Kitt Peak	Spacewatch	·	1.2 km	MPC; JPL
445173	2009 BC_{46}	—	January 16, 2009	Kitt Peak	Spacewatch	·	1.7 km	MPC; JPL
445174	2009 BD_{50}	—	January 1, 2009	Mount Lemmon	Mount Lemmon Survey	·	1.3 km	MPC; JPL
445175	2009 BG_{65}	—	January 20, 2009	Kitt Peak	Spacewatch	·	1.6 km	MPC; JPL
445176	2009 BR_{70}	—	November 21, 2008	Mount Lemmon	Mount Lemmon Survey	·	1.4 km	MPC; JPL
445177	2009 BO_{76}	—	December 31, 2008	Mount Lemmon	Mount Lemmon Survey	·	1.2 km	MPC; JPL
445178	2009 BU_{83}	—	January 31, 2009	Kitt Peak	Spacewatch	·	1.2 km	MPC; JPL
445179	2009 BF_{88}	—	January 16, 2005	Kitt Peak	Spacewatch	·	900 m	MPC; JPL
445180	2009 BL_{97}	—	January 25, 2009	Kitt Peak	Spacewatch	(5)	840 m	MPC; JPL
445181	2009 BC_{106}	—	January 25, 2009	Kitt Peak	Spacewatch	·	1.4 km	MPC; JPL
445182	2009 BY_{112}	—	January 31, 2009	Mount Lemmon	Mount Lemmon Survey	·	1.6 km	MPC; JPL
445183	2009 BY_{141}	—	January 16, 2009	Kitt Peak	Spacewatch	·	970 m	MPC; JPL
445184	2009 BL_{152}	—	January 16, 2009	Kitt Peak	Spacewatch	·	1.1 km	MPC; JPL
445185	2009 BE_{156}	—	January 31, 2009	Kitt Peak	Spacewatch	·	1.1 km	MPC; JPL
445186	2009 BK_{158}	—	December 30, 2008	Mount Lemmon	Mount Lemmon Survey	·	1.9 km	MPC; JPL
445187	2009 BM_{176}	—	January 31, 2009	Kitt Peak	Spacewatch	(5)	910 m	MPC; JPL
445188	2009 BB_{180}	—	January 15, 2009	Kitt Peak	Spacewatch	·	1.8 km	MPC; JPL
445189	2009 BL_{187}	—	January 30, 2009	Mount Lemmon	Mount Lemmon Survey	·	1.8 km	MPC; JPL
445190	2009 CW_{3}	—	February 2, 2009	Moletai	K. Černis, Zdanavicius, J.	·	1.9 km	MPC; JPL
445191	2009 CW_{15}	—	February 3, 2009	Kitt Peak	Spacewatch	·	780 m	MPC; JPL
445192	2009 CW_{22}	—	February 1, 2009	Kitt Peak	Spacewatch	·	3.1 km	MPC; JPL
445193	2009 CB_{38}	—	February 14, 2009	Dauban	Kugel, F.	·	1.1 km	MPC; JPL
445194	2009 CY_{58}	—	February 4, 2009	Mount Lemmon	Mount Lemmon Survey	·	1.6 km	MPC; JPL
445195	2009 CD_{63}	—	February 14, 2009	Kitt Peak	Spacewatch	·	2.2 km	MPC; JPL
445196	2009 DN_{22}	—	February 3, 2009	Kitt Peak	Spacewatch	MAS	740 m	MPC; JPL
445197	2009 DH_{43}	—	February 25, 2009	Dauban	Kugel, F.	·	1.2 km	MPC; JPL
445198	2009 DB_{54}	—	February 22, 2009	Kitt Peak	Spacewatch	·	1.3 km	MPC; JPL
445199	2009 DN_{54}	—	February 22, 2009	Kitt Peak	Spacewatch	·	1.2 km	MPC; JPL
445200	2009 DX_{60}	—	February 22, 2009	Kitt Peak	Spacewatch	·	2.2 km	MPC; JPL

== 445201–445300 ==
back to top

Designation			Discovery			Properties		Ref
Permanent	Provisional	Named after	Date	Site	Discoverer(s)	Category	Diam.	Ref
445201	2009 DT_{67}	—	January 1, 2009	Kitt Peak	Spacewatch	·	1.3 km	MPC; JPL
445202	2009 DG_{73}	—	February 25, 2009	Calar Alto	F. Hormuth	AEO	1.0 km	MPC; JPL
445203	2009 DG_{78}	—	February 21, 2009	Kitt Peak	Spacewatch	·	1.3 km	MPC; JPL
445204	2009 DS_{80}	—	February 22, 2009	Kitt Peak	Spacewatch	EUN	1.4 km	MPC; JPL
445205	2009 DZ_{98}	—	February 26, 2009	Kitt Peak	Spacewatch	MIS	2.6 km	MPC; JPL
445206	2009 DH_{100}	—	February 26, 2009	Kitt Peak	Spacewatch	·	1.4 km	MPC; JPL
445207	2009 DZ_{104}	—	February 26, 2009	Kitt Peak	Spacewatch	·	1.4 km	MPC; JPL
445208	2009 DB_{105}	—	February 26, 2009	Kitt Peak	Spacewatch	·	1.8 km	MPC; JPL
445209	2009 DL_{110}	—	February 20, 2009	Catalina	CSS	H	540 m	MPC; JPL
445210	2009 DR_{110}	—	October 18, 2007	Mount Lemmon	Mount Lemmon Survey	·	990 m	MPC; JPL
445211	2009 DC_{116}	—	February 27, 2009	Kitt Peak	Spacewatch	·	1.1 km	MPC; JPL
445212	2009 DA_{119}	—	February 27, 2009	Kitt Peak	Spacewatch	·	950 m	MPC; JPL
445213	2009 DP_{119}	—	April 6, 2005	Mount Lemmon	Mount Lemmon Survey	·	1.2 km	MPC; JPL
445214	2009 DG_{126}	—	February 19, 2009	Kitt Peak	Spacewatch	·	2.1 km	MPC; JPL
445215	2009 EN_{16}	—	March 15, 2009	Kitt Peak	Spacewatch	·	1.8 km	MPC; JPL
445216	2009 EL_{17}	—	March 15, 2009	Kitt Peak	Spacewatch	·	950 m	MPC; JPL
445217	2009 FH_{6}	—	March 16, 2009	Kitt Peak	Spacewatch	·	730 m	MPC; JPL
445218	2009 FS_{8}	—	February 24, 2009	Kitt Peak	Spacewatch	H	450 m	MPC; JPL
445219	2009 FQ_{9}	—	August 28, 2006	Kitt Peak	Spacewatch	·	1.7 km	MPC; JPL
445220	2009 FO_{34}	—	December 31, 2008	Kitt Peak	Spacewatch	BRG	1.7 km	MPC; JPL
445221	2009 FL_{36}	—	February 28, 2009	Kitt Peak	Spacewatch	MAR	990 m	MPC; JPL
445222	2009 FC_{52}	—	March 28, 2009	Mount Lemmon	Mount Lemmon Survey	·	1.5 km	MPC; JPL
445223	2009 FX_{58}	—	February 27, 2009	Kitt Peak	Spacewatch	·	1.7 km	MPC; JPL
445224	2009 FG_{63}	—	September 25, 1998	Kitt Peak	Spacewatch	·	3.0 km	MPC; JPL
445225	2009 FU_{64}	—	March 16, 2009	Kitt Peak	Spacewatch	MAR	970 m	MPC; JPL
445226	2009 FB_{73}	—	March 21, 2009	Kitt Peak	Spacewatch	H	520 m	MPC; JPL
445227	2009 HM_{6}	—	April 17, 2009	Kitt Peak	Spacewatch	·	2.2 km	MPC; JPL
445228	2009 HQ_{25}	—	April 18, 2009	Kitt Peak	Spacewatch	·	1.8 km	MPC; JPL
445229	2009 HD_{38}	—	December 31, 2008	Kitt Peak	Spacewatch	·	1.5 km	MPC; JPL
445230	2009 HK_{52}	—	April 17, 2009	Catalina	CSS	H	660 m	MPC; JPL
445231	2009 HK_{82}	—	October 8, 2007	Catalina	CSS	H	720 m	MPC; JPL
445232	2009 HQ_{82}	—	March 19, 2009	Mount Lemmon	Mount Lemmon Survey	H	610 m	MPC; JPL
445233	2009 HL_{91}	—	April 27, 2009	Catalina	CSS	·	3.2 km	MPC; JPL
445234	2009 HZ_{103}	—	April 20, 2009	Kitt Peak	Spacewatch	DOR	2.4 km	MPC; JPL
445235	2009 JZ_{2}	—	March 19, 2009	Kitt Peak	Spacewatch	·	2.0 km	MPC; JPL
445236	2009 JH_{14}	—	May 1, 2009	Cerro Burek	Burek, Cerro	·	1.8 km	MPC; JPL
445237	2009 KA	—	May 2, 2009	Mount Lemmon	Mount Lemmon Survey	H	680 m	MPC; JPL
445238	2009 KN_{6}	—	May 1, 2009	Catalina	CSS	·	3.6 km	MPC; JPL
445239	2009 KS_{13}	—	April 18, 2009	Kitt Peak	Spacewatch	·	2.2 km	MPC; JPL
445240	2009 KW_{18}	—	May 27, 2009	Kitt Peak	Spacewatch	·	1.9 km	MPC; JPL
445241	2009 KU_{37}	—	November 16, 2006	Mount Lemmon	Mount Lemmon Survey	·	2.2 km	MPC; JPL
445242	2009 OY_{5}	—	July 16, 2009	La Sagra	OAM	·	4.2 km	MPC; JPL
445243	2009 OZ_{13}	—	July 27, 2009	Kitt Peak	Spacewatch	THM	2.3 km	MPC; JPL
445244	2009 OX_{22}	—	July 19, 2009	Siding Spring	SSS	·	3.3 km	MPC; JPL
445245	2009 OM_{23}	—	July 27, 2009	Catalina	CSS	·	4.2 km	MPC; JPL
445246	2009 PF_{2}	—	July 28, 2009	Catalina	CSS	·	3.2 km	MPC; JPL
445247	2009 QD	—	July 27, 2009	Kitt Peak	Spacewatch	·	3.6 km	MPC; JPL
445248	2009 QF_{13}	—	August 16, 2009	Kitt Peak	Spacewatch	·	3.3 km	MPC; JPL
445249	2009 QX_{18}	—	June 21, 2009	Mount Lemmon	Mount Lemmon Survey	T_{j} (2.96)	3.2 km	MPC; JPL
445250	2009 QR_{46}	—	August 27, 2009	La Sagra	OAM	LIX	3.9 km	MPC; JPL
445251	2009 QU_{53}	—	August 17, 2009	Kitt Peak	Spacewatch	CYB	3.1 km	MPC; JPL
445252	2009 QU_{59}	—	August 17, 2009	Catalina	CSS	·	4.2 km	MPC; JPL
445253	2009 QA_{60}	—	August 22, 2009	Socorro	LINEAR	·	3.8 km	MPC; JPL
445254	2009 QU_{61}	—	August 27, 2009	Catalina	CSS	·	3.4 km	MPC; JPL
445255	2009 QB_{63}	—	August 28, 2009	Kitt Peak	Spacewatch	·	2.8 km	MPC; JPL
445256	2009 QG_{64}	—	August 20, 2009	Catalina	CSS	·	4.6 km	MPC; JPL
445257	2009 RY_{26}	—	August 17, 2009	Catalina	CSS	·	3.2 km	MPC; JPL
445258	2009 RD_{29}	—	September 30, 2003	Kitt Peak	Spacewatch	CYB	3.6 km	MPC; JPL
445259	2009 RR_{50}	—	September 15, 2009	Kitt Peak	Spacewatch	CYB	3.6 km	MPC; JPL
445260	2009 RN_{55}	—	September 15, 2009	Kitt Peak	Spacewatch	·	2.8 km	MPC; JPL
445261	2009 RL_{63}	—	September 14, 2009	Kitt Peak	Spacewatch	·	3.6 km	MPC; JPL
445262	2009 RP_{63}	—	September 15, 2009	Mount Lemmon	Mount Lemmon Survey	·	3.6 km	MPC; JPL
445263	2009 SX_{69}	—	September 17, 2009	Mount Lemmon	Mount Lemmon Survey	·	2.6 km	MPC; JPL
445264	2009 SU_{92}	—	September 21, 2009	Mount Lemmon	Mount Lemmon Survey	·	4.8 km	MPC; JPL
445265	2009 SZ_{97}	—	March 26, 2006	Kitt Peak	Spacewatch	CYB	4.4 km	MPC; JPL
445266	2009 SY_{161}	—	April 11, 2007	Mount Lemmon	Mount Lemmon Survey	·	4.2 km	MPC; JPL
445267	2009 SD_{229}	—	September 29, 2009	Mount Lemmon	Mount Lemmon Survey	AMO · slow	430 m	MPC; JPL
445268	2009 SX_{291}	—	August 16, 2009	Kitt Peak	Spacewatch	THM	2.8 km	MPC; JPL
445269	2009 SU_{325}	—	November 15, 2003	Kitt Peak	Spacewatch	·	750 m	MPC; JPL
445270	2009 SC_{329}	—	September 16, 2009	Mount Lemmon	Mount Lemmon Survey	·	3.2 km	MPC; JPL
445271	2009 SJ_{337}	—	September 27, 2009	Catalina	CSS	·	4.6 km	MPC; JPL
445272	2009 SS_{350}	—	September 27, 2009	Mount Lemmon	Mount Lemmon Survey	EOS	1.9 km	MPC; JPL
445273	2009 SL_{359}	—	September 22, 2009	Mount Lemmon	Mount Lemmon Survey	CYB	4.4 km	MPC; JPL
445274	2009 SV_{359}	—	September 26, 2009	Socorro	LINEAR	·	3.3 km	MPC; JPL
445275	2009 TH_{5}	—	September 26, 2009	Kitt Peak	Spacewatch	·	1.4 km	MPC; JPL
445276	2009 TH_{34}	—	September 28, 2009	Mount Lemmon	Mount Lemmon Survey	·	3.4 km	MPC; JPL
445277	2009 TB_{43}	—	October 1, 2009	Mount Lemmon	Mount Lemmon Survey	CYB	4.6 km	MPC; JPL
445278	2009 VC_{45}	—	October 26, 2009	Kitt Peak	Spacewatch	CYB	5.8 km	MPC; JPL
445279	2009 WZ_{49}	—	November 19, 2009	Kitt Peak	Spacewatch	·	1.8 km	MPC; JPL
445280	2009 WL_{77}	—	November 18, 2009	Kitt Peak	Spacewatch	·	550 m	MPC; JPL
445281	2009 WM_{88}	—	October 16, 2009	Mount Lemmon	Mount Lemmon Survey	·	630 m	MPC; JPL
445282	2009 WB_{89}	—	November 19, 2009	Kitt Peak	Spacewatch	·	490 m	MPC; JPL
445283	2009 WJ_{89}	—	February 6, 2007	Mount Lemmon	Mount Lemmon Survey	·	600 m	MPC; JPL
445284	2009 WH_{138}	—	November 23, 2009	Mount Lemmon	Mount Lemmon Survey	·	1.2 km	MPC; JPL
445285	2009 WL_{153}	—	November 11, 2009	Kitt Peak	Spacewatch	·	740 m	MPC; JPL
445286	2009 WT_{163}	—	November 21, 2009	Kitt Peak	Spacewatch	·	640 m	MPC; JPL
445287	2009 WC_{169}	—	November 22, 2009	Kitt Peak	Spacewatch	3:2	5.0 km	MPC; JPL
445288	2009 WO_{217}	—	November 16, 2009	Mount Lemmon	Mount Lemmon Survey	CYB	4.4 km	MPC; JPL
445289	2009 XE_{19}	—	December 15, 2009	Mount Lemmon	Mount Lemmon Survey	·	900 m	MPC; JPL
445290	2009 XH_{22}	—	December 27, 2006	Mount Lemmon	Mount Lemmon Survey	·	740 m	MPC; JPL
445291	2010 AT_{24}	—	January 6, 2010	Kitt Peak	Spacewatch	·	700 m	MPC; JPL
445292	2010 AF_{26}	—	January 6, 2010	Kitt Peak	Spacewatch	·	590 m	MPC; JPL
445293	2010 AK_{27}	—	January 6, 2010	Kitt Peak	Spacewatch	·	930 m	MPC; JPL
445294	2010 AU_{49}	—	January 8, 2010	Kitt Peak	Spacewatch	·	2.2 km	MPC; JPL
445295	2010 AY_{76}	—	November 21, 2009	Mount Lemmon	Mount Lemmon Survey	·	900 m	MPC; JPL
445296	2010 AN_{104}	—	January 12, 2010	WISE	WISE	PHO	2.9 km	MPC; JPL
445297	2010 BJ_{87}	—	April 11, 2010	Mount Lemmon	Mount Lemmon Survey	·	2.0 km	MPC; JPL
445298	2010 CZ_{21}	—	February 9, 2010	Kitt Peak	Spacewatch	·	770 m	MPC; JPL
445299	2010 CZ_{23}	—	January 17, 2010	Kitt Peak	Spacewatch	·	610 m	MPC; JPL
445300	2010 CS_{92}	—	December 6, 2005	Kitt Peak	Spacewatch	·	940 m	MPC; JPL

== 445301–445400 ==
back to top

Designation			Discovery			Properties		Ref
Permanent	Provisional	Named after	Date	Site	Discoverer(s)	Category	Diam.	Ref
445301	2010 CZ_{114}	—	February 14, 2010	Mount Lemmon	Mount Lemmon Survey	V	580 m	MPC; JPL
445302	2010 CM_{124}	—	October 29, 2005	Catalina	CSS	·	860 m	MPC; JPL
445303	2010 CR_{131}	—	February 14, 2010	WISE	WISE	·	2.6 km	MPC; JPL
445304	2010 CY_{163}	—	February 10, 2010	Kitt Peak	Spacewatch	·	830 m	MPC; JPL
445305	2010 DM_{56}	—	February 19, 2010	WISE	WISE	APO · PHA	760 m	MPC; JPL
445306	2010 DN_{79}	—	February 18, 2010	Mount Lemmon	Mount Lemmon Survey	·	1.0 km	MPC; JPL
445307	2010 EY_{8}	—	March 4, 2010	WISE	WISE	3:2	4.0 km	MPC; JPL
445308 Volov	2010 ET_{20}	Volov	March 7, 2010	Plana	Fratev, F.	·	1.1 km	MPC; JPL
445309	2010 EK_{42}	—	March 12, 2010	LightBuckets	T. Vorobjov	·	1.1 km	MPC; JPL
445310	2010 EP_{87}	—	March 13, 2010	Mount Lemmon	Mount Lemmon Survey	V	650 m	MPC; JPL
445311	2010 ES_{108}	—	March 14, 2010	Kitt Peak	Spacewatch	·	940 m	MPC; JPL
445312	2010 EC_{110}	—	March 4, 2010	Kitt Peak	Spacewatch	·	780 m	MPC; JPL
445313	2010 EF_{132}	—	March 15, 2010	Kitt Peak	Spacewatch	·	1.1 km	MPC; JPL
445314	2010 EU_{139}	—	March 5, 2010	Kitt Peak	Spacewatch	·	1.2 km	MPC; JPL
445315	2010 FC_{15}	—	March 17, 2010	Kitt Peak	Spacewatch	·	970 m	MPC; JPL
445316	2010 FC_{27}	—	February 18, 2010	Kitt Peak	Spacewatch	NYS	1.1 km	MPC; JPL
445317	2010 FQ_{48}	—	September 22, 2008	Mount Lemmon	Mount Lemmon Survey	·	970 m	MPC; JPL
445318	2010 FF_{57}	—	March 18, 2010	Kitt Peak	Spacewatch	·	790 m	MPC; JPL
445319	2010 FN_{72}	—	March 30, 2010	WISE	WISE	PHO	1.4 km	MPC; JPL
445320	2010 FW_{96}	—	September 10, 2007	Kitt Peak	Spacewatch	·	1.2 km	MPC; JPL
445321	2010 GU_{23}	—	April 9, 2010	Catalina	CSS	PHO	1.2 km	MPC; JPL
445322	2010 GX_{24}	—	March 15, 2010	Catalina	CSS	·	1.7 km	MPC; JPL
445323	2010 GS_{28}	—	April 7, 2010	Catalina	CSS	·	1.0 km	MPC; JPL
445324	2010 GC_{30}	—	April 9, 2010	Mount Lemmon	Mount Lemmon Survey	·	1.1 km	MPC; JPL
445325	2010 GS_{33}	—	March 18, 2010	Mount Lemmon	Mount Lemmon Survey	·	920 m	MPC; JPL
445326	2010 GK_{72}	—	April 13, 2010	WISE	WISE	·	1.7 km	MPC; JPL
445327	2010 GD_{98}	—	April 10, 2010	Kitt Peak	Spacewatch	·	1.3 km	MPC; JPL
445328	2010 GE_{119}	—	October 20, 2008	Kitt Peak	Spacewatch	V	730 m	MPC; JPL
445329	2010 HL_{108}	—	January 23, 2006	Socorro	LINEAR	·	1.1 km	MPC; JPL
445330	2010 JM_{15}	—	April 7, 2010	Catalina	CSS	·	2.8 km	MPC; JPL
445331	2010 JT_{36}	—	May 6, 2010	Kitt Peak	Spacewatch	·	1.4 km	MPC; JPL
445332	2010 JD_{43}	—	May 2, 2010	Kitt Peak	Spacewatch	·	3.0 km	MPC; JPL
445333	2010 JL_{46}	—	May 7, 2010	Kitt Peak	Spacewatch	·	1.6 km	MPC; JPL
445334	2010 JP_{75}	—	May 4, 2010	Kitt Peak	Spacewatch	·	1.1 km	MPC; JPL
445335	2010 JR_{75}	—	April 6, 2010	Kitt Peak	Spacewatch	·	1.6 km	MPC; JPL
445336	2010 JP_{79}	—	May 12, 2010	Kitt Peak	Spacewatch	·	1.5 km	MPC; JPL
445337	2010 JL_{162}	—	October 20, 2008	Kitt Peak	Spacewatch	NYS	1.1 km	MPC; JPL
445338	2010 KU_{8}	—	May 17, 2010	Kitt Peak	Spacewatch	·	1.4 km	MPC; JPL
445339	2010 KR_{101}	—	May 28, 2010	WISE	WISE	·	2.6 km	MPC; JPL
445340	2010 LT_{48}	—	June 8, 2010	WISE	WISE	·	3.8 km	MPC; JPL
445341	2010 LU_{63}	—	May 13, 2010	Mount Lemmon	Mount Lemmon Survey	·	2.7 km	MPC; JPL
445342	2010 LM_{74}	—	June 10, 2010	WISE	WISE	·	2.4 km	MPC; JPL
445343	2010 LB_{97}	—	June 13, 2010	WISE	WISE	EOS	2.9 km	MPC; JPL
445344	2010 MQ_{23}	—	June 18, 2010	WISE	WISE	·	2.4 km	MPC; JPL
445345	2010 MJ_{69}	—	October 8, 2005	Kitt Peak	Spacewatch	·	2.3 km	MPC; JPL
445346	2010 MS_{71}	—	June 25, 2010	WISE	WISE	·	3.5 km	MPC; JPL
445347	2010 MQ_{76}	—	June 26, 2010	WISE	WISE	·	3.0 km	MPC; JPL
445348	2010 MY_{84}	—	June 27, 2010	WISE	WISE	·	3.4 km	MPC; JPL
445349	2010 MU_{107}	—	June 30, 2010	WISE	WISE	·	3.0 km	MPC; JPL
445350	2010 MY_{110}	—	June 30, 2010	WISE	WISE	·	1.9 km	MPC; JPL
445351	2010 NP_{12}	—	February 17, 2007	Kitt Peak	Spacewatch	·	3.8 km	MPC; JPL
445352	2010 NS_{23}	—	July 6, 2010	WISE	WISE	·	4.8 km	MPC; JPL
445353	2010 NM_{71}	—	January 27, 2007	Mount Lemmon	Mount Lemmon Survey	·	2.9 km	MPC; JPL
445354	2010 NX_{80}	—	October 28, 2005	Mount Lemmon	Mount Lemmon Survey	·	3.0 km	MPC; JPL
445355	2010 NO_{88}	—	August 6, 2010	Kitt Peak	Spacewatch	EOS	2.7 km	MPC; JPL
445356	2010 NA_{98}	—	July 11, 2010	WISE	WISE	·	3.1 km	MPC; JPL
445357	2010 NA_{104}	—	July 12, 2010	WISE	WISE	·	3.4 km	MPC; JPL
445358	2010 NG_{113}	—	July 13, 2010	WISE	WISE	EOS	3.5 km	MPC; JPL
445359	2010 NU_{117}	—	July 6, 2010	Mount Lemmon	Mount Lemmon Survey	BRA	2.0 km	MPC; JPL
445360	2010 OB_{21}	—	July 18, 2010	WISE	WISE	·	3.2 km	MPC; JPL
445361	2010 OS_{33}	—	September 30, 2005	Mount Lemmon	Mount Lemmon Survey	·	2.6 km	MPC; JPL
445362	2010 OV_{33}	—	July 20, 2010	WISE	WISE	·	3.2 km	MPC; JPL
445363	2010 OU_{40}	—	October 28, 2005	Kitt Peak	Spacewatch	·	5.1 km	MPC; JPL
445364	2010 OK_{59}	—	July 23, 2010	WISE	WISE	·	2.1 km	MPC; JPL
445365	2010 ON_{90}	—	September 10, 2004	Socorro	LINEAR	T_{j} (2.99)	4.2 km	MPC; JPL
445366	2010 OE_{98}	—	July 28, 2010	WISE	WISE	·	2.3 km	MPC; JPL
445367	2010 OF_{112}	—	July 30, 2010	WISE	WISE	·	2.8 km	MPC; JPL
445368	2010 OU_{120}	—	July 31, 2010	WISE	WISE	·	5.8 km	MPC; JPL
445369	2010 OP_{126}	—	July 19, 2010	Siding Spring	SSS	·	2.8 km	MPC; JPL
445370	2010 PS_{10}	—	August 7, 2010	Črni Vrh	Vales, J.	·	2.3 km	MPC; JPL
445371	2010 PU_{26}	—	August 7, 2010	La Sagra	OAM	·	1.9 km	MPC; JPL
445372	2010 PO_{27}	—	August 4, 2010	WISE	WISE	VER	3.6 km	MPC; JPL
445373	2010 PK_{30}	—	November 3, 2005	Mount Lemmon	Mount Lemmon Survey	·	2.5 km	MPC; JPL
445374	2010 PZ_{36}	—	August 6, 2010	WISE	WISE	·	5.1 km	MPC; JPL
445375	2010 PG_{48}	—	August 7, 2010	WISE	WISE	·	4.9 km	MPC; JPL
445376	2010 PC_{55}	—	August 8, 2010	WISE	WISE	·	3.0 km	MPC; JPL
445377	2010 PU_{71}	—	October 8, 2004	Socorro	LINEAR	·	5.5 km	MPC; JPL
445378	2010 RQ_{26}	—	September 2, 2010	Mount Lemmon	Mount Lemmon Survey	·	3.0 km	MPC; JPL
445379	2010 RH_{61}	—	September 6, 2010	Kitt Peak	Spacewatch	·	2.1 km	MPC; JPL
445380	2010 RM_{65}	—	August 12, 2010	Kitt Peak	Spacewatch	H	530 m	MPC; JPL
445381	2010 RQ_{70}	—	September 9, 2010	Kitt Peak	Spacewatch	EOS	1.8 km	MPC; JPL
445382	2010 RV_{74}	—	October 1, 2005	Catalina	CSS	H	430 m	MPC; JPL
445383	2010 RD_{101}	—	October 25, 2005	Kitt Peak	Spacewatch	·	2.1 km	MPC; JPL
445384	2010 RG_{105}	—	September 10, 2010	Kitt Peak	Spacewatch	EOS	1.8 km	MPC; JPL
445385	2010 RO_{113}	—	October 6, 2005	Mount Lemmon	Mount Lemmon Survey	·	2.1 km	MPC; JPL
445386	2010 RG_{117}	—	September 4, 1999	Kitt Peak	Spacewatch	·	2.2 km	MPC; JPL
445387	2010 RH_{119}	—	October 14, 2001	Socorro	LINEAR	·	2.5 km	MPC; JPL
445388	2010 RF_{143}	—	October 7, 2005	Mount Lemmon	Mount Lemmon Survey	·	1.7 km	MPC; JPL
445389	2010 RE_{153}	—	February 13, 2007	Mount Lemmon	Mount Lemmon Survey	EOS	1.8 km	MPC; JPL
445390	2010 RM_{176}	—	September 10, 2010	Kitt Peak	Spacewatch	·	2.7 km	MPC; JPL
445391	2010 RF_{184}	—	October 23, 2005	Kitt Peak	Spacewatch	EOS	1.8 km	MPC; JPL
445392	2010 SU_{2}	—	July 27, 2010	WISE	WISE	·	2.8 km	MPC; JPL
445393	2010 SZ_{5}	—	January 17, 2007	Kitt Peak	Spacewatch	HYG	2.8 km	MPC; JPL
445394	2010 SG_{11}	—	September 2, 2010	Mount Lemmon	Mount Lemmon Survey	TEL	1.1 km	MPC; JPL
445395	2010 SV_{18}	—	October 5, 2005	Kitt Peak	Spacewatch	·	1.2 km	MPC; JPL
445396	2010 SS_{26}	—	September 29, 2010	Kitt Peak	Spacewatch	HOF	2.3 km	MPC; JPL
445397	2010 TN_{10}	—	October 24, 2005	Kitt Peak	Spacewatch	THM	2.0 km	MPC; JPL
445398	2010 TZ_{12}	—	September 30, 2005	Mount Lemmon	Mount Lemmon Survey	EOS	2.1 km	MPC; JPL
445399	2010 TE_{13}	—	September 10, 2010	Kitt Peak	Spacewatch	·	2.7 km	MPC; JPL
445400	2010 TQ_{22}	—	October 12, 2005	Kitt Peak	Spacewatch	·	1.5 km	MPC; JPL

== 445401–445500 ==
back to top

Designation			Discovery			Properties		Ref
Permanent	Provisional	Named after	Date	Site	Discoverer(s)	Category	Diam.	Ref
445401	2010 TB_{23}	—	October 30, 2005	Kitt Peak	Spacewatch	·	1.8 km	MPC; JPL
445402	2010 TE_{23}	—	October 25, 2005	Mount Lemmon	Mount Lemmon Survey	·	1.6 km	MPC; JPL
445403	2010 TB_{31}	—	September 29, 2005	Kitt Peak	Spacewatch	·	2.0 km	MPC; JPL
445404	2010 TC_{34}	—	October 2, 2010	Kitt Peak	Spacewatch	·	1.9 km	MPC; JPL
445405	2010 TX_{37}	—	November 21, 2005	Catalina	CSS	EOS	2.0 km	MPC; JPL
445406	2010 TZ_{44}	—	October 3, 2010	Kitt Peak	Spacewatch	·	2.0 km	MPC; JPL
445407	2010 TO_{60}	—	September 30, 2010	Catalina	CSS	·	2.9 km	MPC; JPL
445408	2010 TO_{70}	—	March 3, 1997	Kitt Peak	Spacewatch	·	1.7 km	MPC; JPL
445409	2010 TJ_{79}	—	October 29, 2005	Mount Lemmon	Mount Lemmon Survey	·	2.6 km	MPC; JPL
445410	2010 TW_{81}	—	December 7, 2005	Kitt Peak	Spacewatch	THM	2.0 km	MPC; JPL
445411	2010 TV_{87}	—	October 13, 2005	Kitt Peak	Spacewatch	·	1.7 km	MPC; JPL
445412	2010 TE_{91}	—	October 8, 2005	Kitt Peak	Spacewatch	·	1.6 km	MPC; JPL
445413	2010 TQ_{100}	—	March 1, 2008	Kitt Peak	Spacewatch	·	1.8 km	MPC; JPL
445414	2010 TD_{106}	—	September 10, 2010	Kitt Peak	Spacewatch	EOS	1.7 km	MPC; JPL
445415	2010 TV_{112}	—	March 27, 2008	Mount Lemmon	Mount Lemmon Survey	·	2.2 km	MPC; JPL
445416	2010 TT_{115}	—	March 16, 2007	Kitt Peak	Spacewatch	·	2.5 km	MPC; JPL
445417	2010 TY_{142}	—	October 11, 2010	Mount Lemmon	Mount Lemmon Survey	·	2.3 km	MPC; JPL
445418	2010 TL_{144}	—	October 11, 2010	Mount Lemmon	Mount Lemmon Survey	EOS	2.2 km	MPC; JPL
445419	2010 TZ_{147}	—	November 13, 2006	Kitt Peak	Spacewatch	·	1.7 km	MPC; JPL
445420	2010 TT_{166}	—	November 11, 2005	Kitt Peak	Spacewatch	·	2.6 km	MPC; JPL
445421	2010 TG_{168}	—	December 25, 2005	Mount Lemmon	Mount Lemmon Survey	THM	2.2 km	MPC; JPL
445422	2010 TJ_{178}	—	October 22, 2005	Kitt Peak	Spacewatch	·	1.6 km	MPC; JPL
445423	2010 TU_{184}	—	April 3, 2008	Mount Lemmon	Mount Lemmon Survey	·	2.2 km	MPC; JPL
445424	2010 TL_{187}	—	October 30, 2005	Mount Lemmon	Mount Lemmon Survey	·	2.2 km	MPC; JPL
445425	2010 UL_{1}	—	October 17, 2010	Mount Lemmon	Mount Lemmon Survey	·	2.5 km	MPC; JPL
445426	2010 UJ_{10}	—	July 31, 2010	WISE	WISE	·	3.6 km	MPC; JPL
445427	2010 UU_{16}	—	October 14, 2010	Mount Lemmon	Mount Lemmon Survey	·	4.2 km	MPC; JPL
445428	2010 UV_{21}	—	October 28, 2010	Catalina	CSS	·	4.5 km	MPC; JPL
445429	2010 UL_{25}	—	October 28, 2010	Kitt Peak	Spacewatch	·	2.9 km	MPC; JPL
445430	2010 UH_{32}	—	October 12, 2010	Mount Lemmon	Mount Lemmon Survey	EOS	2.2 km	MPC; JPL
445431	2010 UX_{34}	—	December 2, 2005	Kitt Peak	Spacewatch	·	2.6 km	MPC; JPL
445432	2010 UB_{42}	—	October 25, 2005	Kitt Peak	Spacewatch	EOS	1.7 km	MPC; JPL
445433	2010 UK_{44}	—	October 12, 2010	Mount Lemmon	Mount Lemmon Survey	TIR	3.3 km	MPC; JPL
445434	2010 UL_{51}	—	January 27, 2007	Mount Lemmon	Mount Lemmon Survey	·	1.9 km	MPC; JPL
445435	2010 UY_{52}	—	October 11, 2010	Mount Lemmon	Mount Lemmon Survey	EOS	1.8 km	MPC; JPL
445436	2010 UM_{53}	—	March 5, 2008	Mount Lemmon	Mount Lemmon Survey	·	3.1 km	MPC; JPL
445437	2010 UU_{62}	—	December 24, 2005	Socorro	LINEAR	·	3.4 km	MPC; JPL
445438	2010 UY_{63}	—	October 19, 2010	Mount Lemmon	Mount Lemmon Survey	·	2.8 km	MPC; JPL
445439	2010 UM_{65}	—	July 26, 2010	WISE	WISE	·	2.5 km	MPC; JPL
445440	2010 US_{65}	—	October 28, 2005	Mount Lemmon	Mount Lemmon Survey	·	2.8 km	MPC; JPL
445441	2010 UY_{67}	—	October 10, 2010	Kitt Peak	Spacewatch	·	1.8 km	MPC; JPL
445442	2010 UP_{69}	—	August 17, 2009	Kitt Peak	Spacewatch	·	3.0 km	MPC; JPL
445443	2010 UH_{72}	—	March 31, 2008	Kitt Peak	Spacewatch	EOS	2.1 km	MPC; JPL
445444	2010 UP_{73}	—	October 29, 2010	Mount Lemmon	Mount Lemmon Survey	·	3.1 km	MPC; JPL
445445	2010 UK_{77}	—	October 13, 2010	Mount Lemmon	Mount Lemmon Survey	·	3.2 km	MPC; JPL
445446	2010 UM_{78}	—	February 25, 2007	Kitt Peak	Spacewatch	·	2.0 km	MPC; JPL
445447	2010 UY_{79}	—	September 11, 2010	Mount Lemmon	Mount Lemmon Survey	·	2.0 km	MPC; JPL
445448	2010 UA_{81}	—	March 29, 2008	Kitt Peak	Spacewatch	·	3.4 km	MPC; JPL
445449	2010 UZ_{87}	—	March 14, 2007	Kitt Peak	Spacewatch	·	2.6 km	MPC; JPL
445450	2010 UE_{88}	—	October 30, 2010	Kitt Peak	Spacewatch	·	3.1 km	MPC; JPL
445451	2010 UJ_{101}	—	November 5, 2005	Kitt Peak	Spacewatch	·	2.0 km	MPC; JPL
445452	2010 UL_{107}	—	November 4, 2005	Kitt Peak	Spacewatch	·	2.8 km	MPC; JPL
445453	2010 VT_{5}	—	July 27, 2010	WISE	WISE	·	1.6 km	MPC; JPL
445454	2010 VH_{10}	—	October 12, 1999	Socorro	LINEAR	·	3.1 km	MPC; JPL
445455	2010 VB_{14}	—	November 2, 2005	Mount Lemmon	Mount Lemmon Survey	·	1.7 km	MPC; JPL
445456	2010 VF_{15}	—	August 8, 2010	WISE	WISE	·	3.6 km	MPC; JPL
445457	2010 VA_{16}	—	October 12, 2010	Mount Lemmon	Mount Lemmon Survey	EOS	1.7 km	MPC; JPL
445458	2010 VU_{19}	—	September 11, 2004	Socorro	LINEAR	·	3.6 km	MPC; JPL
445459	2010 VM_{20}	—	September 11, 2010	Mount Lemmon	Mount Lemmon Survey	·	4.2 km	MPC; JPL
445460	2010 VF_{37}	—	January 5, 2006	Catalina	CSS	·	3.3 km	MPC; JPL
445461	2010 VJ_{40}	—	September 7, 2004	Kitt Peak	Spacewatch	·	2.4 km	MPC; JPL
445462	2010 VU_{48}	—	January 8, 2006	Kitt Peak	Spacewatch	THM	2.6 km	MPC; JPL
445463	2010 VD_{61}	—	November 10, 2005	Mount Lemmon	Mount Lemmon Survey	·	3.4 km	MPC; JPL
445464	2010 VE_{64}	—	November 28, 1999	Kitt Peak	Spacewatch	·	2.7 km	MPC; JPL
445465	2010 VW_{69}	—	November 5, 2010	Kitt Peak	Spacewatch	·	1.8 km	MPC; JPL
445466	2010 VQ_{73}	—	October 24, 2005	Kitt Peak	Spacewatch	EOS	1.5 km	MPC; JPL
445467	2010 VK_{77}	—	October 11, 2010	Catalina	CSS	·	2.9 km	MPC; JPL
445468	2010 VZ_{77}	—	September 11, 2010	Mount Lemmon	Mount Lemmon Survey	·	3.0 km	MPC; JPL
445469	2010 VG_{82}	—	November 3, 2010	Mount Lemmon	Mount Lemmon Survey	·	3.2 km	MPC; JPL
445470	2010 VG_{84}	—	October 15, 2004	Kitt Peak	Spacewatch	HYG	2.5 km	MPC; JPL
445471	2010 VO_{85}	—	October 17, 2010	Mount Lemmon	Mount Lemmon Survey	·	2.7 km	MPC; JPL
445472	2010 VA_{89}	—	September 18, 2010	Mount Lemmon	Mount Lemmon Survey	·	3.3 km	MPC; JPL
445473	2010 VZ_{98}	—	November 12, 2010	La Silla	D. L. Rabinowitz, M. E. Schwamb, S. Tourtellotte	SDO	369 km	MPC; JPL
445474	2010 VF_{101}	—	September 17, 2004	Kitt Peak	Spacewatch	THM	1.8 km	MPC; JPL
445475	2010 VX_{107}	—	April 29, 2008	Mount Lemmon	Mount Lemmon Survey	·	4.6 km	MPC; JPL
445476	2010 VN_{113}	—	December 30, 2000	Kitt Peak	Spacewatch	·	1.8 km	MPC; JPL
445477	2010 VZ_{115}	—	September 11, 2010	Mount Lemmon	Mount Lemmon Survey	·	3.4 km	MPC; JPL
445478	2010 VF_{129}	—	November 30, 2005	Kitt Peak	Spacewatch	·	1.8 km	MPC; JPL
445479	2010 VR_{135}	—	December 4, 2005	Kitt Peak	Spacewatch	THM	1.9 km	MPC; JPL
445480	2010 VM_{138}	—	November 30, 2005	Kitt Peak	Spacewatch	·	4.3 km	MPC; JPL
445481	2010 VH_{149}	—	October 5, 2004	Kitt Peak	Spacewatch	·	2.3 km	MPC; JPL
445482	2010 VN_{152}	—	November 6, 2010	Mount Lemmon	Mount Lemmon Survey	HYG	2.5 km	MPC; JPL
445483	2010 VS_{152}	—	October 4, 2004	Kitt Peak	Spacewatch	·	2.8 km	MPC; JPL
445484	2010 VG_{153}	—	October 22, 2005	Kitt Peak	Spacewatch	·	1.8 km	MPC; JPL
445485	2010 VU_{157}	—	October 29, 2010	Mount Lemmon	Mount Lemmon Survey	·	3.0 km	MPC; JPL
445486	2010 VQ_{162}	—	November 2, 1999	Kitt Peak	Spacewatch	·	1.8 km	MPC; JPL
445487	2010 VM_{173}	—	November 2, 2010	Kitt Peak	Spacewatch	·	2.1 km	MPC; JPL
445488	2010 VE_{175}	—	October 4, 2004	Kitt Peak	Spacewatch	·	3.2 km	MPC; JPL
445489	2010 VY_{175}	—	October 30, 2010	Mount Lemmon	Mount Lemmon Survey	·	3.6 km	MPC; JPL
445490	2010 VJ_{177}	—	November 4, 1999	Kitt Peak	Spacewatch	·	1.8 km	MPC; JPL
445491	2010 VH_{182}	—	November 29, 2005	Kitt Peak	Spacewatch	VER	3.4 km	MPC; JPL
445492	2010 VZ_{184}	—	October 7, 2004	Kitt Peak	Spacewatch	THM	2.0 km	MPC; JPL
445493	2010 VW_{187}	—	November 29, 2005	Kitt Peak	Spacewatch	EOS	2.3 km	MPC; JPL
445494	2010 VR_{189}	—	November 6, 2010	Kitt Peak	Spacewatch	·	2.8 km	MPC; JPL
445495	2010 VZ_{191}	—	November 7, 2010	Kitt Peak	Spacewatch	THM	2.3 km	MPC; JPL
445496	2010 VG_{199}	—	December 4, 1999	Kitt Peak	Spacewatch	LIX	3.7 km	MPC; JPL
445497	2010 VG_{202}	—	January 7, 2000	Socorro	LINEAR	·	5.0 km	MPC; JPL
445498	2010 VR_{204}	—	October 24, 2005	Kitt Peak	Spacewatch	·	2.3 km	MPC; JPL
445499	2010 VL_{205}	—	October 11, 2010	Mount Lemmon	Mount Lemmon Survey	EOS	1.9 km	MPC; JPL
445500	2010 VH_{207}	—	October 19, 2010	Mount Lemmon	Mount Lemmon Survey	·	2.5 km	MPC; JPL

== 445501–445600 ==
back to top

Designation			Discovery			Properties		Ref
Permanent	Provisional	Named after	Date	Site	Discoverer(s)	Category	Diam.	Ref
445501	2010 VJ_{207}	—	February 21, 2007	Mount Lemmon	Mount Lemmon Survey	·	2.0 km	MPC; JPL
445502	2010 VA_{209}	—	October 13, 2010	Mount Lemmon	Mount Lemmon Survey	(31811)	3.1 km	MPC; JPL
445503	2010 VW_{210}	—	October 13, 2010	Mount Lemmon	Mount Lemmon Survey	VER	2.8 km	MPC; JPL
445504	2010 VP_{211}	—	March 12, 2007	Kitt Peak	Spacewatch	·	3.4 km	MPC; JPL
445505	2010 VH_{212}	—	August 1, 2009	Kitt Peak	Spacewatch	EOS	2.3 km	MPC; JPL
445506	2010 WY_{3}	—	December 30, 2005	Kitt Peak	Spacewatch	THM	2.1 km	MPC; JPL
445507	2010 WP_{6}	—	November 10, 2010	Mount Lemmon	Mount Lemmon Survey	·	2.8 km	MPC; JPL
445508	2010 WH_{8}	—	November 10, 2010	Mount Lemmon	Mount Lemmon Survey	·	3.4 km	MPC; JPL
445509	2010 WC_{11}	—	November 15, 2010	Mount Lemmon	Mount Lemmon Survey	·	3.2 km	MPC; JPL
445510	2010 WU_{13}	—	October 25, 2005	Mount Lemmon	Mount Lemmon Survey	·	2.1 km	MPC; JPL
445511	2010 WH_{15}	—	November 1, 2010	Kitt Peak	Spacewatch	·	3.5 km	MPC; JPL
445512	2010 WS_{22}	—	February 2, 2006	Kitt Peak	Spacewatch	·	2.6 km	MPC; JPL
445513	2010 WL_{30}	—	September 4, 2010	Kitt Peak	Spacewatch	·	3.5 km	MPC; JPL
445514	2010 WV_{42}	—	October 14, 1999	Socorro	LINEAR	H	860 m	MPC; JPL
445515	2010 WN_{53}	—	December 3, 1999	Kitt Peak	Spacewatch	·	2.8 km	MPC; JPL
445516	2010 WW_{53}	—	September 28, 1994	Kitt Peak	Spacewatch	·	1.8 km	MPC; JPL
445517	2010 WG_{56}	—	June 20, 1998	Kitt Peak	Spacewatch	·	3.3 km	MPC; JPL
445518	2010 WU_{71}	—	December 28, 2005	Kitt Peak	Spacewatch	·	2.0 km	MPC; JPL
445519	2010 XE_{13}	—	July 30, 2009	Catalina	CSS	·	4.7 km	MPC; JPL
445520	2010 XO_{17}	—	December 2, 2010	Kitt Peak	Spacewatch	·	4.5 km	MPC; JPL
445521	2010 XL_{52}	—	January 5, 2003	Socorro	LINEAR	H	930 m	MPC; JPL
445522	2010 XF_{58}	—	October 29, 2010	Mount Lemmon	Mount Lemmon Survey	VER	3.2 km	MPC; JPL
445523	2010 XJ_{64}	—	November 25, 2005	Kitt Peak	Spacewatch	·	2.2 km	MPC; JPL
445524	2010 XM_{68}	—	December 7, 1999	Socorro	LINEAR	·	2.9 km	MPC; JPL
445525	2010 XK_{88}	—	December 15, 2004	Socorro	LINEAR	·	3.9 km	MPC; JPL
445526	2011 AL	—	December 10, 2010	Mount Lemmon	Mount Lemmon Survey	·	3.2 km	MPC; JPL
445527	2011 AL_{13}	—	November 5, 2010	Mount Lemmon	Mount Lemmon Survey	THB	3.9 km	MPC; JPL
445528	2011 AE_{29}	—	December 29, 2010	Catalina	CSS	H	750 m	MPC; JPL
445529	2011 AY_{30}	—	December 5, 2010	Mount Lemmon	Mount Lemmon Survey	·	3.3 km	MPC; JPL
445530	2011 AS_{55}	—	December 3, 2010	Mount Lemmon	Mount Lemmon Survey	·	4.3 km	MPC; JPL
445531	2011 BH_{11}	—	September 6, 2004	Socorro	LINEAR	·	3.8 km	MPC; JPL
445532	2011 BR_{120}	—	August 17, 2009	Catalina	CSS	·	3.4 km	MPC; JPL
445533	2011 BE_{161}	—	September 11, 2004	Kitt Peak	Spacewatch	·	2.6 km	MPC; JPL
445534	2011 CZ_{86}	—	September 4, 2008	Kitt Peak	Spacewatch	3:2	5.7 km	MPC; JPL
445535	2011 EL_{24}	—	February 10, 2008	Mount Lemmon	Mount Lemmon Survey	·	1.2 km	MPC; JPL
445536	2011 EP_{24}	—	February 25, 2011	Kitt Peak	Spacewatch	·	530 m	MPC; JPL
445537	2011 EQ_{66}	—	February 22, 2011	Kitt Peak	Spacewatch	·	620 m	MPC; JPL
445538	2011 FL_{23}	—	August 7, 2008	Kitt Peak	Spacewatch	·	900 m	MPC; JPL
445539	2011 FK_{25}	—	March 17, 2004	Kitt Peak	Spacewatch	PHO	750 m	MPC; JPL
445540	2011 FR_{47}	—	July 2, 2008	Kitt Peak	Spacewatch	·	600 m	MPC; JPL
445541	2011 FW_{86}	—	December 13, 2006	Kitt Peak	Spacewatch	·	720 m	MPC; JPL
445542	2011 FZ_{129}	—	February 25, 2011	Mount Lemmon	Mount Lemmon Survey	·	660 m	MPC; JPL
445543	2011 FU_{154}	—	April 12, 2004	Desert Eagle	W. K. Y. Yeung	(2076)	700 m	MPC; JPL
445544	2011 GT	—	August 28, 2005	Kitt Peak	Spacewatch	·	620 m	MPC; JPL
445545	2011 GX_{1}	—	April 1, 2011	Mount Lemmon	Mount Lemmon Survey	·	650 m	MPC; JPL
445546	2011 GV_{48}	—	March 13, 2011	Mount Lemmon	Mount Lemmon Survey	·	660 m	MPC; JPL
445547	2011 HT_{13}	—	September 29, 2005	Kitt Peak	Spacewatch	·	700 m	MPC; JPL
445548	2011 HW_{18}	—	March 29, 2011	Kitt Peak	Spacewatch	·	810 m	MPC; JPL
445549	2011 HU_{84}	—	April 30, 2011	Mount Lemmon	Mount Lemmon Survey	·	690 m	MPC; JPL
445550	2011 HD_{89}	—	July 9, 2005	Kitt Peak	Spacewatch	·	550 m	MPC; JPL
445551	2011 JE_{9}	—	February 8, 2007	Kitt Peak	Spacewatch	·	1.1 km	MPC; JPL
445552	2011 JX_{30}	—	March 19, 2004	Socorro	LINEAR	·	610 m	MPC; JPL
445553	2011 KV_{8}	—	March 9, 2007	Kitt Peak	Spacewatch	·	770 m	MPC; JPL
445554	2011 KZ_{10}	—	May 21, 2004	Kitt Peak	Spacewatch	·	800 m	MPC; JPL
445555	2011 KP_{33}	—	May 26, 2011	Mount Lemmon	Mount Lemmon Survey	·	670 m	MPC; JPL
445556	2011 KN_{48}	—	October 26, 2005	Kitt Peak	Spacewatch	·	880 m	MPC; JPL
445557	2011 LN_{16}	—	September 23, 2008	Kitt Peak	Spacewatch	PHO	3.9 km	MPC; JPL
445558	2011 OD_{4}	—	June 23, 2011	Kitt Peak	Spacewatch	PHO	1.1 km	MPC; JPL
445559	2011 OD_{8}	—	January 24, 2006	Mount Lemmon	Mount Lemmon Survey	·	1.1 km	MPC; JPL
445560	2011 OS_{14}	—	June 11, 2011	Mount Lemmon	Mount Lemmon Survey	·	1.3 km	MPC; JPL
445561	2011 OE_{18}	—	May 12, 2007	Kitt Peak	Spacewatch	NYS	1.1 km	MPC; JPL
445562	2011 OU_{23}	—	March 14, 2007	Mount Lemmon	Mount Lemmon Survey	NYS	1.2 km	MPC; JPL
445563	2011 OA_{32}	—	October 8, 2004	Kitt Peak	Spacewatch	·	1.1 km	MPC; JPL
445564	2011 OC_{49}	—	July 3, 2011	Mount Lemmon	Mount Lemmon Survey	·	1.1 km	MPC; JPL
445565	2011 QH_{7}	—	December 2, 2004	Kitt Peak	Spacewatch	·	1.1 km	MPC; JPL
445566	2011 QM_{24}	—	September 12, 2007	Kitt Peak	Spacewatch	KON	1.7 km	MPC; JPL
445567	2011 QC_{26}	—	August 24, 2000	Socorro	LINEAR	·	1.1 km	MPC; JPL
445568	2011 QP_{27}	—	December 22, 2008	Mount Lemmon	Mount Lemmon Survey	·	1.1 km	MPC; JPL
445569	2011 QJ_{28}	—	January 26, 2009	Mount Lemmon	Mount Lemmon Survey	·	1.4 km	MPC; JPL
445570	2011 QA_{33}	—	December 30, 2008	Kitt Peak	Spacewatch	NYS	1.0 km	MPC; JPL
445571	2011 QC_{36}	—	August 23, 2007	Kitt Peak	Spacewatch	·	1.2 km	MPC; JPL
445572	2011 QJ_{38}	—	May 25, 2003	Kitt Peak	Spacewatch	·	1.4 km	MPC; JPL
445573	2011 QG_{42}	—	August 1, 2011	Siding Spring	SSS	·	1.5 km	MPC; JPL
445574	2011 QL_{55}	—	October 15, 2007	Kitt Peak	Spacewatch	·	1.1 km	MPC; JPL
445575	2011 QY_{57}	—	September 21, 2007	Kitt Peak	Spacewatch	·	1.3 km	MPC; JPL
445576	2011 QL_{59}	—	September 22, 2003	Kitt Peak	Spacewatch	(5) · critical	630 m	MPC; JPL
445577	2011 QJ_{62}	—	October 8, 2007	Catalina	CSS	·	1.2 km	MPC; JPL
445578	2011 QD_{64}	—	January 29, 2009	Kitt Peak	Spacewatch	·	810 m	MPC; JPL
445579	2011 QQ_{66}	—	June 16, 2007	Kitt Peak	Spacewatch	·	2.2 km	MPC; JPL
445580	2011 QD_{69}	—	December 30, 2008	Kitt Peak	Spacewatch	·	1.1 km	MPC; JPL
445581	2011 QL_{74}	—	September 5, 1996	Kitt Peak	Spacewatch	·	1.1 km	MPC; JPL
445582	2011 QG_{80}	—	October 11, 2007	Catalina	CSS	·	850 m	MPC; JPL
445583	2011 QC_{84}	—	August 10, 2007	Kitt Peak	Spacewatch	·	990 m	MPC; JPL
445584	2011 QU_{87}	—	August 10, 2007	Kitt Peak	Spacewatch	·	720 m	MPC; JPL
445585	2011 RW_{3}	—	October 6, 2007	Socorro	LINEAR	·	800 m	MPC; JPL
445586	2011 RN_{15}	—	September 24, 2008	Mount Lemmon	Mount Lemmon Survey	·	1.2 km	MPC; JPL
445587	2011 SA_{14}	—	September 18, 2011	Mount Lemmon	Mount Lemmon Survey	·	1.5 km	MPC; JPL
445588	2011 SE_{23}	—	March 1, 2009	Mount Lemmon	Mount Lemmon Survey	·	2.4 km	MPC; JPL
445589	2011 SJ_{31}	—	December 21, 2008	Mount Lemmon	Mount Lemmon Survey	·	900 m	MPC; JPL
445590	2011 SW_{32}	—	December 30, 2008	Mount Lemmon	Mount Lemmon Survey	·	1.5 km	MPC; JPL
445591	2011 SC_{33}	—	January 30, 2009	Mount Lemmon	Mount Lemmon Survey	·	1.3 km	MPC; JPL
445592	2011 SH_{49}	—	September 27, 2003	Kitt Peak	Spacewatch	(5)	580 m	MPC; JPL
445593	2011 SO_{50}	—	November 19, 2003	Kitt Peak	Spacewatch	·	1.1 km	MPC; JPL
445594	2011 SZ_{64}	—	October 12, 2007	Mount Lemmon	Mount Lemmon Survey	(5)	990 m	MPC; JPL
445595	2011 SC_{66}	—	September 10, 2007	Catalina	CSS	PHO	960 m	MPC; JPL
445596	2011 SB_{68}	—	September 20, 2004	Tucson	R. A. Tucker	·	1.0 km	MPC; JPL
445597	2011 SQ_{68}	—	December 29, 2008	Mount Lemmon	Mount Lemmon Survey	EUN	1.3 km	MPC; JPL
445598	2011 SM_{74}	—	September 18, 2007	Catalina	CSS	·	1.0 km	MPC; JPL
445599	2011 SU_{77}	—	September 11, 2007	Mount Lemmon	Mount Lemmon Survey	·	1.5 km	MPC; JPL
445600	2011 SM_{84}	—	April 12, 2005	Kitt Peak	Spacewatch	·	1.8 km	MPC; JPL

== 445601–445700 ==
back to top

Designation			Discovery			Properties		Ref
Permanent	Provisional	Named after	Date	Site	Discoverer(s)	Category	Diam.	Ref
445601	2011 SR_{86}	—	October 30, 2007	Catalina	CSS	·	1.4 km	MPC; JPL
445602	2011 ST_{87}	—	March 9, 2005	Mount Lemmon	Mount Lemmon Survey	·	1.2 km	MPC; JPL
445603	2011 SP_{90}	—	November 19, 2007	Kitt Peak	Spacewatch	·	1.1 km	MPC; JPL
445604	2011 SV_{91}	—	November 3, 2007	Catalina	CSS	·	2.0 km	MPC; JPL
445605	2011 SK_{101}	—	April 9, 2010	Kitt Peak	Spacewatch	·	1.3 km	MPC; JPL
445606	2011 SL_{109}	—	December 1, 2008	Mount Lemmon	Mount Lemmon Survey	·	1.7 km	MPC; JPL
445607	2011 SP_{115}	—	October 11, 2007	Catalina	CSS	·	1.0 km	MPC; JPL
445608	2011 SD_{118}	—	November 20, 2000	Kitt Peak	Spacewatch	·	1.3 km	MPC; JPL
445609	2011 ST_{128}	—	September 23, 2011	Kitt Peak	Spacewatch	·	1.4 km	MPC; JPL
445610	2011 ST_{134}	—	October 15, 2007	Mount Lemmon	Mount Lemmon Survey	EUN	960 m	MPC; JPL
445611	2011 SG_{135}	—	January 17, 2004	Kitt Peak	Spacewatch	·	1.6 km	MPC; JPL
445612	2011 SM_{138}	—	October 4, 2007	Kitt Peak	Spacewatch	(5)	970 m	MPC; JPL
445613	2011 SX_{141}	—	May 11, 2002	Socorro	LINEAR	·	2.1 km	MPC; JPL
445614	2011 SZ_{142}	—	October 15, 2007	Kitt Peak	Spacewatch	(5)	800 m	MPC; JPL
445615	2011 SB_{147}	—	October 18, 2003	Kitt Peak	Spacewatch	·	1.0 km	MPC; JPL
445616	2011 SD_{155}	—	October 4, 2003	Kitt Peak	Spacewatch	·	1.1 km	MPC; JPL
445617	2011 SG_{158}	—	October 12, 2007	Anderson Mesa	LONEOS	EUN	1.1 km	MPC; JPL
445618	2011 SB_{178}	—	September 14, 2007	Mount Lemmon	Mount Lemmon Survey	·	1.5 km	MPC; JPL
445619	2011 SX_{178}	—	October 20, 2007	Mount Lemmon	Mount Lemmon Survey	·	1.1 km	MPC; JPL
445620	2011 SY_{181}	—	October 21, 2007	Kitt Peak	Spacewatch	EUN	1.3 km	MPC; JPL
445621	2011 SE_{187}	—	November 1, 2007	Kitt Peak	Spacewatch	·	1.3 km	MPC; JPL
445622	2011 SZ_{190}	—	October 2, 2002	Socorro	LINEAR	·	1.7 km	MPC; JPL
445623	2011 SG_{193}	—	September 28, 2003	Kitt Peak	Spacewatch	(5)	1.1 km	MPC; JPL
445624	2011 SE_{211}	—	January 31, 2006	Kitt Peak	Spacewatch	·	1.3 km	MPC; JPL
445625	2011 SN_{212}	—	October 17, 1996	Kitt Peak	Spacewatch	PHO	1.1 km	MPC; JPL
445626	2011 SR_{218}	—	February 12, 2004	Kitt Peak	Spacewatch	EUN	1.3 km	MPC; JPL
445627	2011 SD_{229}	—	August 27, 2006	Kitt Peak	Spacewatch	·	1.6 km	MPC; JPL
445628	2011 SO_{229}	—	November 23, 2003	Anderson Mesa	LONEOS	·	700 m	MPC; JPL
445629	2011 SC_{230}	—	September 26, 2011	Kitt Peak	Spacewatch	·	1.8 km	MPC; JPL
445630	2011 SW_{232}	—	July 18, 2007	Mount Lemmon	Mount Lemmon Survey	·	1.2 km	MPC; JPL
445631	2011 SS_{244}	—	October 13, 2007	Kitt Peak	Spacewatch	·	910 m	MPC; JPL
445632	2011 SZ_{244}	—	March 8, 2005	Mount Lemmon	Mount Lemmon Survey	(5)	1.1 km	MPC; JPL
445633	2011 SN_{246}	—	September 21, 2011	Catalina	CSS	·	2.8 km	MPC; JPL
445634	2011 SK_{250}	—	September 13, 2007	Mount Lemmon	Mount Lemmon Survey	·	1.2 km	MPC; JPL
445635	2011 SY_{257}	—	September 21, 2011	Kitt Peak	Spacewatch	·	1.5 km	MPC; JPL
445636	2011 SM_{258}	—	May 14, 2005	Kitt Peak	Spacewatch	·	1.6 km	MPC; JPL
445637	2011 SB_{259}	—	September 28, 2006	Kitt Peak	Spacewatch	·	1.9 km	MPC; JPL
445638	2011 TR_{1}	—	September 20, 2011	Kitt Peak	Spacewatch	·	1.4 km	MPC; JPL
445639	2011 TL_{6}	—	April 9, 2010	Kitt Peak	Spacewatch	·	1.1 km	MPC; JPL
445640	2011 UX	—	October 1, 2011	Kitt Peak	Spacewatch	·	1.3 km	MPC; JPL
445641	2011 UQ_{5}	—	November 23, 1998	Kitt Peak	Spacewatch	·	1.4 km	MPC; JPL
445642	2011 UT_{6}	—	November 8, 2007	Kitt Peak	Spacewatch	·	1.3 km	MPC; JPL
445643	2011 UB_{10}	—	August 19, 2006	Kitt Peak	Spacewatch	AEO	960 m	MPC; JPL
445644	2011 UQ_{11}	—	November 19, 2003	Anderson Mesa	LONEOS	·	970 m	MPC; JPL
445645	2011 UF_{12}	—	April 2, 2006	Kitt Peak	Spacewatch	·	1.3 km	MPC; JPL
445646	2011 UZ_{16}	—	September 24, 2011	Mount Lemmon	Mount Lemmon Survey	(5)	1.2 km	MPC; JPL
445647	2011 UH_{30}	—	October 18, 2011	Mount Lemmon	Mount Lemmon Survey	·	1.7 km	MPC; JPL
445648	2011 UP_{36}	—	October 19, 2011	Mount Lemmon	Mount Lemmon Survey	·	1.7 km	MPC; JPL
445649	2011 UE_{44}	—	November 3, 2007	Kitt Peak	Spacewatch	·	1.1 km	MPC; JPL
445650	2011 UK_{47}	—	October 18, 2011	Kitt Peak	Spacewatch	·	1.3 km	MPC; JPL
445651	2011 UG_{48}	—	March 31, 2009	Mount Lemmon	Mount Lemmon Survey	·	1.7 km	MPC; JPL
445652	2011 UK_{49}	—	February 13, 2004	Kitt Peak	Spacewatch	MIS	2.3 km	MPC; JPL
445653	2011 UU_{51}	—	October 30, 2007	Kitt Peak	Spacewatch	·	1.2 km	MPC; JPL
445654	2011 UG_{54}	—	April 30, 2005	Kitt Peak	Spacewatch	·	2.4 km	MPC; JPL
445655	2011 UJ_{65}	—	November 1, 2007	Kitt Peak	Spacewatch	·	1.5 km	MPC; JPL
445656	2011 UD_{67}	—	October 20, 2011	Mount Lemmon	Mount Lemmon Survey	AGN	1.0 km	MPC; JPL
445657	2011 UZ_{70}	—	December 8, 1998	Anderson Mesa	LONEOS	·	1.4 km	MPC; JPL
445658	2011 UV_{74}	—	November 5, 2007	Kitt Peak	Spacewatch	·	1.3 km	MPC; JPL
445659	2011 UK_{75}	—	August 27, 2006	Kitt Peak	Spacewatch	·	1.5 km	MPC; JPL
445660	2011 UK_{76}	—	October 19, 2011	Kitt Peak	Spacewatch	·	1.6 km	MPC; JPL
445661	2011 UN_{76}	—	October 19, 2011	Kitt Peak	Spacewatch	·	1.9 km	MPC; JPL
445662	2011 UR_{77}	—	October 19, 2011	Kitt Peak	Spacewatch	·	1.5 km	MPC; JPL
445663	2011 UJ_{79}	—	August 28, 2006	Kitt Peak	Spacewatch	·	1.6 km	MPC; JPL
445664	2011 UA_{80}	—	October 19, 2011	Kitt Peak	Spacewatch	·	1.6 km	MPC; JPL
445665	2011 UO_{82}	—	December 13, 2007	Socorro	LINEAR	·	1.3 km	MPC; JPL
445666	2011 UU_{83}	—	November 1, 2006	Mount Lemmon	Mount Lemmon Survey	·	2.0 km	MPC; JPL
445667	2011 UX_{84}	—	October 19, 2011	Kitt Peak	Spacewatch	(5)	1.3 km	MPC; JPL
445668	2011 UQ_{86}	—	October 20, 2011	Mount Lemmon	Mount Lemmon Survey	·	1.7 km	MPC; JPL
445669	2011 UE_{88}	—	December 16, 2007	Mount Lemmon	Mount Lemmon Survey	·	2.1 km	MPC; JPL
445670	2011 UP_{90}	—	December 17, 2003	Socorro	LINEAR	·	2.1 km	MPC; JPL
445671	2011 UK_{92}	—	December 18, 2003	Kitt Peak	Spacewatch	·	1.0 km	MPC; JPL
445672	2011 UX_{92}	—	November 5, 2007	Kitt Peak	Spacewatch	·	1.3 km	MPC; JPL
445673	2011 UP_{94}	—	September 29, 2011	Mount Lemmon	Mount Lemmon Survey	MAR	1.3 km	MPC; JPL
445674	2011 UT_{95}	—	October 19, 2011	Mount Lemmon	Mount Lemmon Survey	·	1.8 km	MPC; JPL
445675	2011 UF_{96}	—	December 5, 2007	Kitt Peak	Spacewatch	AGN	1.0 km	MPC; JPL
445676	2011 UK_{96}	—	September 21, 2011	Kitt Peak	Spacewatch	·	1.4 km	MPC; JPL
445677	2011 UV_{103}	—	September 29, 2011	Mount Lemmon	Mount Lemmon Survey	·	1.5 km	MPC; JPL
445678	2011 UG_{105}	—	June 17, 2010	Mount Lemmon	Mount Lemmon Survey	·	1.4 km	MPC; JPL
445679	2011 UJ_{114}	—	October 21, 2011	Mount Lemmon	Mount Lemmon Survey	·	1.5 km	MPC; JPL
445680	2011 UF_{122}	—	September 28, 2011	Kitt Peak	Spacewatch	·	1.5 km	MPC; JPL
445681	2011 UW_{126}	—	September 23, 2011	Mount Lemmon	Mount Lemmon Survey	·	2.0 km	MPC; JPL
445682	2011 UD_{129}	—	December 4, 2007	Kitt Peak	Spacewatch	·	940 m	MPC; JPL
445683	2011 UJ_{139}	—	October 22, 2011	Kitt Peak	Spacewatch	·	1.2 km	MPC; JPL
445684	2011 UP_{140}	—	September 27, 2011	Mount Lemmon	Mount Lemmon Survey	WIT	1.0 km	MPC; JPL
445685	2011 UG_{145}	—	October 16, 2007	Catalina	CSS	·	1.6 km	MPC; JPL
445686	2011 UD_{147}	—	December 16, 2007	Mount Lemmon	Mount Lemmon Survey	·	1.6 km	MPC; JPL
445687	2011 UJ_{149}	—	May 11, 2010	Mount Lemmon	Mount Lemmon Survey	·	1.8 km	MPC; JPL
445688	2011 UD_{151}	—	September 22, 1998	Caussols	ODAS	·	1.6 km	MPC; JPL
445689	2011 UN_{155}	—	October 28, 2006	Kitt Peak	Spacewatch	·	1.5 km	MPC; JPL
445690	2011 UY_{159}	—	October 25, 2011	Haleakala	Pan-STARRS 1	EUN	1.2 km	MPC; JPL
445691	2011 UX_{160}	—	October 21, 2011	Mount Lemmon	Mount Lemmon Survey	(5)	1.2 km	MPC; JPL
445692	2011 UC_{163}	—	November 11, 2007	Mount Lemmon	Mount Lemmon Survey	·	1.1 km	MPC; JPL
445693	2011 UJ_{166}	—	December 15, 2007	Kitt Peak	Spacewatch	·	1.2 km	MPC; JPL
445694	2011 UB_{172}	—	November 8, 2007	Catalina	CSS	·	1.4 km	MPC; JPL
445695	2011 UG_{173}	—	February 29, 2004	Kitt Peak	Spacewatch	·	1.4 km	MPC; JPL
445696	2011 UK_{174}	—	September 28, 1994	Kitt Peak	Spacewatch	·	1.4 km	MPC; JPL
445697	2011 UC_{176}	—	October 20, 2011	Mount Lemmon	Mount Lemmon Survey	WIT	850 m	MPC; JPL
445698	2011 UP_{182}	—	August 27, 2006	Anderson Mesa	LONEOS	·	1.6 km	MPC; JPL
445699	2011 UB_{184}	—	December 30, 2007	Kitt Peak	Spacewatch	·	1.6 km	MPC; JPL
445700	2011 UC_{188}	—	May 12, 2005	Mount Lemmon	Mount Lemmon Survey	·	1.8 km	MPC; JPL

== 445701–445800 ==
back to top

Designation			Discovery			Properties		Ref
Permanent	Provisional	Named after	Date	Site	Discoverer(s)	Category	Diam.	Ref
445701	2011 UA_{191}	—	October 19, 2011	Mount Lemmon	Mount Lemmon Survey	·	1.3 km	MPC; JPL
445702	2011 UG_{193}	—	December 16, 2007	Kitt Peak	Spacewatch	(5)	1.5 km	MPC; JPL
445703	2011 UU_{195}	—	March 7, 2009	Mount Lemmon	Mount Lemmon Survey	·	1.8 km	MPC; JPL
445704	2011 UQ_{196}	—	August 28, 2006	Kitt Peak	Spacewatch	·	1.9 km	MPC; JPL
445705	2011 UK_{197}	—	September 24, 2011	Mount Lemmon	Mount Lemmon Survey	·	1.8 km	MPC; JPL
445706	2011 UL_{198}	—	December 30, 2007	Mount Lemmon	Mount Lemmon Survey	WIT	880 m	MPC; JPL
445707	2011 UR_{198}	—	October 25, 2011	Kitt Peak	Spacewatch	·	1.4 km	MPC; JPL
445708	2011 UP_{210}	—	September 15, 2007	Mount Lemmon	Mount Lemmon Survey	·	2.5 km	MPC; JPL
445709	2011 UW_{243}	—	October 27, 2006	Kitt Peak	Spacewatch	·	1.6 km	MPC; JPL
445710	2011 UO_{245}	—	October 22, 2011	Kitt Peak	Spacewatch	·	1.6 km	MPC; JPL
445711	2011 UN_{252}	—	September 17, 2006	Kitt Peak	Spacewatch	DOR	2.2 km	MPC; JPL
445712	2011 UD_{255}	—	November 9, 2007	Kitt Peak	Spacewatch	·	1.2 km	MPC; JPL
445713	2011 UV_{260}	—	November 19, 2007	Kitt Peak	Spacewatch	·	1.4 km	MPC; JPL
445714	2011 UC_{261}	—	October 23, 2011	Kitt Peak	Spacewatch	·	1.4 km	MPC; JPL
445715	2011 UA_{265}	—	October 18, 2011	Kitt Peak	Spacewatch	·	1.7 km	MPC; JPL
445716	2011 UV_{266}	—	October 18, 2011	Catalina	CSS	·	1.4 km	MPC; JPL
445717	2011 UW_{269}	—	November 7, 2007	Kitt Peak	Spacewatch	·	1.6 km	MPC; JPL
445718	2011 UC_{279}	—	December 16, 2007	Mount Lemmon	Mount Lemmon Survey	·	1.8 km	MPC; JPL
445719	2011 UA_{282}	—	October 20, 2011	Mount Lemmon	Mount Lemmon Survey	AGN	1.1 km	MPC; JPL
445720	2011 UA_{283}	—	April 22, 2009	Mount Lemmon	Mount Lemmon Survey	NEM	1.8 km	MPC; JPL
445721	2011 UN_{283}	—	January 16, 2008	Kitt Peak	Spacewatch	MRX	970 m	MPC; JPL
445722	2011 UO_{287}	—	February 20, 2009	Kitt Peak	Spacewatch	·	1.7 km	MPC; JPL
445723	2011 UC_{289}	—	October 20, 2011	Mount Lemmon	Mount Lemmon Survey	·	1.1 km	MPC; JPL
445724	2011 UA_{297}	—	October 29, 2011	Kitt Peak	Spacewatch	·	1.4 km	MPC; JPL
445725	2011 UB_{299}	—	October 13, 1998	Kitt Peak	Spacewatch	·	1.3 km	MPC; JPL
445726	2011 UC_{300}	—	November 15, 2006	Mount Lemmon	Mount Lemmon Survey	·	2.2 km	MPC; JPL
445727	2011 UY_{302}	—	March 29, 2000	Kitt Peak	Spacewatch	·	1.3 km	MPC; JPL
445728	2011 UU_{310}	—	October 30, 2011	Kitt Peak	Spacewatch	·	1.5 km	MPC; JPL
445729	2011 UO_{322}	—	October 18, 2011	Catalina	CSS	·	2.1 km	MPC; JPL
445730	2011 UM_{325}	—	October 16, 2007	Mount Lemmon	Mount Lemmon Survey	·	980 m	MPC; JPL
445731	2011 UB_{336}	—	August 26, 1998	Kitt Peak	Spacewatch	·	1.2 km	MPC; JPL
445732	2011 UT_{347}	—	December 31, 2007	Kitt Peak	Spacewatch	·	1.3 km	MPC; JPL
445733	2011 UK_{359}	—	November 2, 2007	Kitt Peak	Spacewatch	·	930 m	MPC; JPL
445734	2011 UQ_{359}	—	November 4, 2007	Kitt Peak	Spacewatch	·	1.2 km	MPC; JPL
445735	2011 UH_{360}	—	January 13, 2008	Mount Lemmon	Mount Lemmon Survey	AGN	1.0 km	MPC; JPL
445736	2011 UD_{374}	—	September 15, 2007	Mount Lemmon	Mount Lemmon Survey	KON	2.3 km	MPC; JPL
445737	2011 UY_{385}	—	December 17, 2007	Mount Lemmon	Mount Lemmon Survey	·	1.8 km	MPC; JPL
445738	2011 UH_{389}	—	March 4, 2005	Mount Lemmon	Mount Lemmon Survey	EUN	1.4 km	MPC; JPL
445739	2011 UX_{397}	—	September 27, 2011	Kitt Peak	Spacewatch	·	2.4 km	MPC; JPL
445740	2011 UJ_{405}	—	September 13, 1998	Kitt Peak	Spacewatch	·	1.6 km	MPC; JPL
445741	2011 VS_{7}	—	October 2, 2002	Socorro	LINEAR	·	1.7 km	MPC; JPL
445742	2011 VG_{13}	—	January 15, 2004	Kitt Peak	Spacewatch	·	1.6 km	MPC; JPL
445743	2011 WE_{2}	—	December 19, 2003	Socorro	LINEAR	·	1.3 km	MPC; JPL
445744	2011 WO_{14}	—	January 16, 2008	Kitt Peak	Spacewatch	·	1.5 km	MPC; JPL
445745	2011 WS_{24}	—	September 28, 2006	Kitt Peak	Spacewatch	·	1.8 km	MPC; JPL
445746	2011 WL_{30}	—	August 29, 2006	Kitt Peak	Spacewatch	·	1.3 km	MPC; JPL
445747	2011 WW_{36}	—	October 18, 2011	Mount Lemmon	Mount Lemmon Survey	WIT	860 m	MPC; JPL
445748	2011 WS_{39}	—	September 29, 1994	Kitt Peak	Spacewatch	·	1.2 km	MPC; JPL
445749	2011 WT_{42}	—	October 1, 2005	Catalina	CSS	·	2.4 km	MPC; JPL
445750	2011 WG_{43}	—	October 15, 2007	Mount Lemmon	Mount Lemmon Survey	·	1.3 km	MPC; JPL
445751	2011 WC_{57}	—	December 5, 2007	Kitt Peak	Spacewatch	·	1.6 km	MPC; JPL
445752	2011 WA_{69}	—	November 17, 2007	Mount Lemmon	Mount Lemmon Survey	·	1.4 km	MPC; JPL
445753	2011 WW_{69}	—	January 9, 2002	Socorro	LINEAR	·	1.8 km	MPC; JPL
445754	2011 WY_{69}	—	February 12, 2004	Kitt Peak	Spacewatch	·	1.0 km	MPC; JPL
445755	2011 WV_{70}	—	November 11, 2007	Mount Lemmon	Mount Lemmon Survey	·	1.0 km	MPC; JPL
445756	2011 WD_{73}	—	April 17, 2009	Kitt Peak	Spacewatch	·	1.9 km	MPC; JPL
445757	2011 WR_{81}	—	November 22, 2006	Kitt Peak	Spacewatch	NAE	2.0 km	MPC; JPL
445758	2011 WR_{84}	—	November 21, 2007	Mount Lemmon	Mount Lemmon Survey	·	1.0 km	MPC; JPL
445759	2011 WN_{96}	—	September 18, 2006	Kitt Peak	Spacewatch	·	1.5 km	MPC; JPL
445760	2011 WV_{96}	—	December 19, 2007	Mount Lemmon	Mount Lemmon Survey	·	1.1 km	MPC; JPL
445761	2011 WT_{97}	—	December 31, 2007	Kitt Peak	Spacewatch	·	1.6 km	MPC; JPL
445762	2011 WT_{103}	—	July 6, 2010	Kitt Peak	Spacewatch	EOS	1.9 km	MPC; JPL
445763	2011 WR_{105}	—	November 16, 2011	Kitt Peak	Spacewatch	·	2.3 km	MPC; JPL
445764	2011 WY_{112}	—	September 29, 2011	Catalina	CSS	·	1.7 km	MPC; JPL
445765	2011 WD_{114}	—	December 20, 1995	Kitt Peak	Spacewatch	·	1.3 km	MPC; JPL
445766	2011 WB_{115}	—	December 19, 2007	Kitt Peak	Spacewatch	·	1.8 km	MPC; JPL
445767	2011 WC_{115}	—	November 12, 2007	Mount Lemmon	Mount Lemmon Survey	·	1.7 km	MPC; JPL
445768	2011 WY_{118}	—	March 28, 2009	Kitt Peak	Spacewatch	·	2.0 km	MPC; JPL
445769	2011 WH_{136}	—	November 20, 2006	Mount Lemmon	Mount Lemmon Survey	BRA	1.9 km	MPC; JPL
445770	2011 WD_{137}	—	September 17, 2006	Kitt Peak	Spacewatch	AGN	980 m	MPC; JPL
445771	2011 WX_{142}	—	January 10, 2008	Mount Lemmon	Mount Lemmon Survey	·	1.4 km	MPC; JPL
445772	2011 WD_{143}	—	January 11, 2008	Kitt Peak	Spacewatch	HOF	2.0 km	MPC; JPL
445773	2011 WS_{151}	—	January 17, 2009	Kitt Peak	Spacewatch	·	1.5 km	MPC; JPL
445774	2011 XN_{3}	—	December 14, 2007	Socorro	LINEAR	·	1.8 km	MPC; JPL
445775	2011 YA	—	December 16, 2011	Catalina	CSS	APO	670 m	MPC; JPL
445776	2011 YP_{9}	—	November 16, 2011	Mount Lemmon	Mount Lemmon Survey	·	1.4 km	MPC; JPL
445777	2011 YU_{15}	—	April 7, 1999	Socorro	LINEAR	·	1.3 km	MPC; JPL
445778	2011 YW_{17}	—	March 12, 2008	Kitt Peak	Spacewatch	·	1.7 km	MPC; JPL
445779	2011 YU_{32}	—	July 20, 2010	WISE	WISE	·	3.2 km	MPC; JPL
445780	2011 YP_{33}	—	November 28, 2011	Mount Lemmon	Mount Lemmon Survey	·	3.6 km	MPC; JPL
445781	2011 YR_{45}	—	October 25, 2005	Mount Lemmon	Mount Lemmon Survey	·	2.5 km	MPC; JPL
445782	2011 YJ_{48}	—	December 24, 2011	Mount Lemmon	Mount Lemmon Survey	·	1.8 km	MPC; JPL
445783	2011 YF_{53}	—	October 27, 2006	Catalina	CSS	·	1.8 km	MPC; JPL
445784	2011 YD_{57}	—	November 22, 2006	Mount Lemmon	Mount Lemmon Survey	·	2.9 km	MPC; JPL
445785	2011 YZ_{65}	—	December 31, 2011	Kitt Peak	Spacewatch	·	2.6 km	MPC; JPL
445786	2011 YR_{77}	—	February 17, 2007	Mount Lemmon	Mount Lemmon Survey	·	2.6 km	MPC; JPL
445787	2011 YA_{78}	—	December 19, 2003	Kitt Peak	Spacewatch	·	1.4 km	MPC; JPL
445788	2012 AN_{2}	—	September 13, 2004	Socorro	LINEAR	EOS	2.6 km	MPC; JPL
445789	2012 AK_{4}	—	December 12, 2006	Mount Lemmon	Mount Lemmon Survey	·	2.1 km	MPC; JPL
445790	2012 AY_{4}	—	August 7, 2010	WISE	WISE	·	5.5 km	MPC; JPL
445791	2012 AN_{14}	—	February 11, 2008	Mount Lemmon	Mount Lemmon Survey	·	2.3 km	MPC; JPL
445792	2012 AF_{20}	—	November 25, 2005	Catalina	CSS	EOS	1.9 km	MPC; JPL
445793	2012 AO_{21}	—	July 21, 2010	WISE	WISE	·	4.0 km	MPC; JPL
445794	2012 BD_{1}	—	February 20, 2001	Socorro	LINEAR	·	2.7 km	MPC; JPL
445795	2012 BC_{5}	—	October 19, 2006	Mount Lemmon	Mount Lemmon Survey	NEM	2.2 km	MPC; JPL
445796	2012 BN_{5}	—	September 12, 2004	Kitt Peak	Spacewatch	·	2.7 km	MPC; JPL
445797	2012 BB_{16}	—	January 21, 2001	Kitt Peak	Spacewatch	·	3.3 km	MPC; JPL
445798	2012 BV_{29}	—	December 26, 2011	Kitt Peak	Spacewatch	·	1.6 km	MPC; JPL
445799	2012 BY_{29}	—	March 12, 2007	Mount Lemmon	Mount Lemmon Survey	·	2.3 km	MPC; JPL
445800	2012 BQ_{32}	—	February 25, 2007	Mount Lemmon	Mount Lemmon Survey	VER	2.7 km	MPC; JPL

== 445801–445900 ==
back to top

Designation			Discovery			Properties		Ref
Permanent	Provisional	Named after	Date	Site	Discoverer(s)	Category	Diam.	Ref
445801	2012 BD_{34}	—	October 11, 2010	Mount Lemmon	Mount Lemmon Survey	·	3.7 km	MPC; JPL
445802	2012 BD_{48}	—	December 24, 2011	Mount Lemmon	Mount Lemmon Survey	·	2.2 km	MPC; JPL
445803	2012 BN_{58}	—	January 10, 2007	Mount Lemmon	Mount Lemmon Survey	·	3.1 km	MPC; JPL
445804	2012 BJ_{67}	—	July 25, 2010	WISE	WISE	·	2.6 km	MPC; JPL
445805	2012 BH_{76}	—	January 18, 1996	Kitt Peak	Spacewatch	·	2.2 km	MPC; JPL
445806	2012 BK_{81}	—	October 25, 2005	Kitt Peak	Spacewatch	·	1.9 km	MPC; JPL
445807	2012 BP_{81}	—	February 6, 2007	Mount Lemmon	Mount Lemmon Survey	·	1.6 km	MPC; JPL
445808	2012 BK_{84}	—	December 28, 2005	Mount Lemmon	Mount Lemmon Survey	·	2.9 km	MPC; JPL
445809	2012 BS_{86}	—	January 10, 2007	Socorro	LINEAR	DOR	3.4 km	MPC; JPL
445810	2012 BK_{89}	—	November 17, 2006	Kitt Peak	Spacewatch	·	1.7 km	MPC; JPL
445811	2012 BU_{90}	—	May 3, 2008	Mount Lemmon	Mount Lemmon Survey	·	3.5 km	MPC; JPL
445812	2012 BX_{110}	—	January 27, 2012	Kitt Peak	Spacewatch	EOS	2.2 km	MPC; JPL
445813	2012 BH_{112}	—	March 14, 2005	Mount Lemmon	Mount Lemmon Survey	3:2 · SHU	4.9 km	MPC; JPL
445814	2012 BO_{112}	—	September 3, 2010	Mount Lemmon	Mount Lemmon Survey	·	2.8 km	MPC; JPL
445815	2012 BF_{117}	—	July 27, 2010	WISE	WISE	EOS	3.5 km	MPC; JPL
445816	2012 BH_{120}	—	November 1, 2010	Mount Lemmon	Mount Lemmon Survey	·	2.2 km	MPC; JPL
445817	2012 BM_{124}	—	January 27, 2012	Mount Lemmon	Mount Lemmon Survey	·	1.9 km	MPC; JPL
445818 Ronbeck	2012 BR_{128}	Ronbeck	July 25, 2010	WISE	WISE	LIX	4.0 km	MPC; JPL
445819	2012 BF_{130}	—	January 19, 2012	Kitt Peak	Spacewatch	·	2.9 km	MPC; JPL
445820	2012 BQ_{131}	—	August 6, 2010	WISE	WISE	·	4.5 km	MPC; JPL
445821	2012 BV_{135}	—	September 23, 2005	Kitt Peak	Spacewatch	·	1.8 km	MPC; JPL
445822	2012 BK_{139}	—	November 12, 2010	Mount Lemmon	Mount Lemmon Survey	·	2.3 km	MPC; JPL
445823	2012 BO_{151}	—	November 21, 2005	Catalina	CSS	EOS	2.4 km	MPC; JPL
445824	2012 BF_{152}	—	January 28, 2007	Mount Lemmon	Mount Lemmon Survey	·	2.6 km	MPC; JPL
445825	2012 CR_{2}	—	October 2, 2010	Kitt Peak	Spacewatch	·	1.3 km	MPC; JPL
445826	2012 CQ_{5}	—	November 10, 2010	Mount Lemmon	Mount Lemmon Survey	VER	3.4 km	MPC; JPL
445827	2012 CV_{9}	—	January 4, 2012	Mount Lemmon	Mount Lemmon Survey	VER	2.9 km	MPC; JPL
445828	2012 CW_{17}	—	August 10, 2009	Kitt Peak	Spacewatch	·	3.7 km	MPC; JPL
445829	2012 CG_{18}	—	October 25, 2005	Kitt Peak	Spacewatch	·	1.8 km	MPC; JPL
445830	2012 CL_{19}	—	February 11, 2012	Mount Lemmon	Mount Lemmon Survey	APO · critical	130 m	MPC; JPL
445831	2012 CR_{33}	—	December 6, 2005	Kitt Peak	Spacewatch	·	2.9 km	MPC; JPL
445832	2012 CU_{40}	—	January 23, 2006	Kitt Peak	Spacewatch	·	3.1 km	MPC; JPL
445833	2012 CT_{41}	—	November 6, 2005	Kitt Peak	Spacewatch	·	1.8 km	MPC; JPL
445834	2012 CX_{44}	—	September 7, 2002	Socorro	LINEAR	CYB	3.7 km	MPC; JPL
445835	2012 CN_{52}	—	January 29, 2012	Kitt Peak	Spacewatch	EOS	2.2 km	MPC; JPL
445836	2012 CG_{53}	—	January 18, 2012	Catalina	CSS	THB	3.2 km	MPC; JPL
445837	2012 DO_{7}	—	August 9, 2010	WISE	WISE	·	3.3 km	MPC; JPL
445838	2012 DT_{10}	—	January 30, 2012	Kitt Peak	Spacewatch	·	2.9 km	MPC; JPL
445839	2012 DW_{12}	—	November 4, 2004	Socorro	LINEAR	·	3.8 km	MPC; JPL
445840	2012 DE_{25}	—	January 22, 2006	Catalina	CSS	·	3.5 km	MPC; JPL
445841	2012 DT_{25}	—	September 7, 2004	Kitt Peak	Spacewatch	·	2.5 km	MPC; JPL
445842	2012 DA_{31}	—	November 3, 2010	Mount Lemmon	Mount Lemmon Survey	·	3.4 km	MPC; JPL
445843	2012 DB_{54}	—	March 28, 2008	Mount Lemmon	Mount Lemmon Survey	·	1.5 km	MPC; JPL
445844	2012 DS_{55}	—	February 24, 2006	Kitt Peak	Spacewatch	·	3.7 km	MPC; JPL
445845	2012 DD_{56}	—	February 3, 2006	Mount Lemmon	Mount Lemmon Survey	·	2.7 km	MPC; JPL
445846	2012 DP_{89}	—	January 17, 2007	Catalina	CSS	·	2.1 km	MPC; JPL
445847	2012 ET_{16}	—	February 21, 2012	Mount Lemmon	Mount Lemmon Survey	·	2.5 km	MPC; JPL
445848	2012 FX_{26}	—	February 21, 2012	Kitt Peak	Spacewatch	3:2	5.5 km	MPC; JPL
445849	2012 FO_{45}	—	December 26, 2005	Mount Lemmon	Mount Lemmon Survey	·	2.1 km	MPC; JPL
445850	2012 FF_{63}	—	January 22, 2006	Socorro	LINEAR	·	2.6 km	MPC; JPL
445851	2012 FC_{75}	—	September 26, 2009	Mount Lemmon	Mount Lemmon Survey	·	3.8 km	MPC; JPL
445852	2012 FU_{81}	—	October 14, 2004	Anderson Mesa	LONEOS	·	3.2 km	MPC; JPL
445853	2012 GH_{32}	—	January 26, 2006	Anderson Mesa	LONEOS	·	3.3 km	MPC; JPL
445854	2012 HT_{20}	—	September 26, 2005	Catalina	CSS	H	550 m	MPC; JPL
445855	2012 HG_{42}	—	November 17, 2010	Mount Lemmon	Mount Lemmon Survey	·	3.6 km	MPC; JPL
445856	2012 HD_{56}	—	November 13, 2010	Kitt Peak	Spacewatch	·	2.4 km	MPC; JPL
445857	2012 MR_{6}	—	November 2, 2010	Mount Lemmon	Mount Lemmon Survey	H	660 m	MPC; JPL
445858	2012 OL	—	October 9, 2007	Catalina	CSS	H	710 m	MPC; JPL
445859	2012 SX_{46}	—	October 23, 2006	Mount Lemmon	Mount Lemmon Survey	·	900 m	MPC; JPL
445860	2012 SD_{51}	—	January 27, 2007	Kitt Peak	Spacewatch	·	610 m	MPC; JPL
445861	2012 TU_{10}	—	October 6, 2012	Mount Lemmon	Mount Lemmon Survey	·	760 m	MPC; JPL
445862	2012 TO_{54}	—	March 11, 2007	Catalina	CSS	·	820 m	MPC; JPL
445863	2012 TS_{57}	—	January 27, 2007	Mount Lemmon	Mount Lemmon Survey	·	610 m	MPC; JPL
445864	2012 TH_{66}	—	September 23, 2012	Mount Lemmon	Mount Lemmon Survey	·	680 m	MPC; JPL
445865	2012 TC_{69}	—	January 10, 2007	Mount Lemmon	Mount Lemmon Survey	·	520 m	MPC; JPL
445866	2012 TN_{87}	—	April 15, 2007	Mount Lemmon	Mount Lemmon Survey	·	570 m	MPC; JPL
445867	2012 TD_{120}	—	October 16, 2009	Kitt Peak	Spacewatch	·	650 m	MPC; JPL
445868	2012 TQ_{149}	—	May 10, 2005	Mount Lemmon	Mount Lemmon Survey	·	530 m	MPC; JPL
445869	2012 TU_{155}	—	December 16, 2009	Mount Lemmon	Mount Lemmon Survey	·	540 m	MPC; JPL
445870	2012 TS_{168}	—	October 4, 1996	Kitt Peak	Spacewatch	·	530 m	MPC; JPL
445871	2012 TZ_{193}	—	November 16, 2009	Kitt Peak	Spacewatch	·	670 m	MPC; JPL
445872	2012 TU_{206}	—	April 6, 2011	Kitt Peak	Spacewatch	·	630 m	MPC; JPL
445873	2012 TB_{243}	—	September 14, 2012	Kitt Peak	Spacewatch	·	580 m	MPC; JPL
445874	2012 TS_{255}	—	October 15, 2012	Kitt Peak	Spacewatch	·	770 m	MPC; JPL
445875	2012 TA_{284}	—	October 15, 2012	Mount Lemmon	Mount Lemmon Survey	·	720 m	MPC; JPL
445876	2012 UQ_{26}	—	December 25, 2009	Kitt Peak	Spacewatch	V	650 m	MPC; JPL
445877	2012 UT_{45}	—	November 16, 2009	Mount Lemmon	Mount Lemmon Survey	·	600 m	MPC; JPL
445878	2012 UH_{56}	—	October 13, 2012	Kitt Peak	Spacewatch	·	530 m	MPC; JPL
445879	2012 UG_{91}	—	November 9, 1999	Kitt Peak	Spacewatch	·	620 m	MPC; JPL
445880	2012 UF_{99}	—	November 17, 2006	Kitt Peak	Spacewatch	·	850 m	MPC; JPL
445881	2012 UN_{116}	—	November 23, 2009	Kitt Peak	Spacewatch	·	740 m	MPC; JPL
445882	2012 UL_{124}	—	December 8, 2005	Kitt Peak	Spacewatch	·	740 m	MPC; JPL
445883	2012 UR_{133}	—	November 17, 2009	Kitt Peak	Spacewatch	·	760 m	MPC; JPL
445884	2012 UZ_{149}	—	December 17, 2009	Kitt Peak	Spacewatch	·	670 m	MPC; JPL
445885	2012 UO_{163}	—	March 30, 2008	Kitt Peak	Spacewatch	·	940 m	MPC; JPL
445886	2012 VZ	—	December 19, 2009	Kitt Peak	Spacewatch	·	750 m	MPC; JPL
445887	2012 VL_{10}	—	November 29, 2005	Kitt Peak	Spacewatch	·	850 m	MPC; JPL
445888	2012 VJ_{16}	—	December 15, 2009	Mount Lemmon	Mount Lemmon Survey	·	590 m	MPC; JPL
445889	2012 VB_{17}	—	March 12, 2010	Kitt Peak	Spacewatch	NYS	940 m	MPC; JPL
445890	2012 VA_{18}	—	November 30, 2005	Kitt Peak	Spacewatch	·	770 m	MPC; JPL
445891	2012 VU_{24}	—	January 10, 2007	Mount Lemmon	Mount Lemmon Survey	·	550 m	MPC; JPL
445892	2012 VH_{34}	—	July 3, 2005	Mount Lemmon	Mount Lemmon Survey	·	600 m	MPC; JPL
445893	2012 VC_{39}	—	September 4, 1999	Kitt Peak	Spacewatch	·	540 m	MPC; JPL
445894	2012 VV_{42}	—	November 6, 2012	Mount Lemmon	Mount Lemmon Survey	·	820 m	MPC; JPL
445895	2012 VD_{44}	—	April 5, 2011	Kitt Peak	Spacewatch	·	790 m	MPC; JPL
445896	2012 VY_{57}	—	October 20, 2012	Kitt Peak	Spacewatch	·	670 m	MPC; JPL
445897	2012 VP_{73}	—	December 22, 2005	Kitt Peak	Spacewatch	·	940 m	MPC; JPL
445898	2012 VD_{81}	—	February 23, 2007	Mount Lemmon	Mount Lemmon Survey	·	660 m	MPC; JPL
445899	2012 VA_{82}	—	March 29, 2011	Kitt Peak	Spacewatch	·	840 m	MPC; JPL
445900	2012 VH_{82}	—	December 16, 2009	Kitt Peak	Spacewatch	·	1.1 km	MPC; JPL

== 445901–446000 ==
back to top

Designation			Discovery			Properties		Ref
Permanent	Provisional	Named after	Date	Site	Discoverer(s)	Category	Diam.	Ref
445901	2012 VE_{85}	—	October 1, 2005	Kitt Peak	Spacewatch	·	580 m	MPC; JPL
445902	2012 VA_{87}	—	November 10, 2009	Mount Lemmon	Mount Lemmon Survey	·	840 m	MPC; JPL
445903	2012 VH_{105}	—	March 22, 2004	Socorro	LINEAR	·	700 m	MPC; JPL
445904	2012 VY_{105}	—	October 27, 2005	Mount Lemmon	Mount Lemmon Survey	·	640 m	MPC; JPL
445905	2012 WV_{16}	—	July 29, 2008	Kitt Peak	Spacewatch	·	860 m	MPC; JPL
445906	2012 WO_{25}	—	March 9, 2007	Mount Lemmon	Mount Lemmon Survey	·	580 m	MPC; JPL
445907	2012 WQ_{27}	—	September 14, 2007	Catalina	CSS	·	3.1 km	MPC; JPL
445908	2012 WE_{35}	—	November 7, 2012	Kitt Peak	Spacewatch	·	680 m	MPC; JPL
445909	2012 XN_{32}	—	March 9, 2007	Mount Lemmon	Mount Lemmon Survey	·	540 m	MPC; JPL
445910	2012 XO_{32}	—	November 28, 2005	Mount Lemmon	Mount Lemmon Survey	·	2.5 km	MPC; JPL
445911	2012 XM_{33}	—	November 1, 2005	Mount Lemmon	Mount Lemmon Survey	·	880 m	MPC; JPL
445912	2012 XC_{38}	—	December 15, 2001	Socorro	LINEAR	PHO	1.3 km	MPC; JPL
445913	2012 XJ_{44}	—	November 3, 2005	Kitt Peak	Spacewatch	·	640 m	MPC; JPL
445914	2012 XH_{46}	—	February 1, 2003	Kitt Peak	Spacewatch	·	1.9 km	MPC; JPL
445915	2012 XZ_{49}	—	October 22, 2005	Catalina	CSS	·	790 m	MPC; JPL
445916	2012 XE_{50}	—	October 24, 1995	Kitt Peak	Spacewatch	·	520 m	MPC; JPL
445917 Ola	2012 XF_{71}	Ola	December 5, 2012	Tincana	Kusiak, M., Zolnowski, M.	MAR	1.1 km	MPC; JPL
445918	2012 XT_{83}	—	December 6, 2012	Kitt Peak	Spacewatch	·	1.3 km	MPC; JPL
445919	2012 XE_{94}	—	January 27, 2007	Mount Lemmon	Mount Lemmon Survey	·	650 m	MPC; JPL
445920	2012 XH_{94}	—	October 1, 2008	Kitt Peak	Spacewatch	V	790 m	MPC; JPL
445921	2012 XQ_{95}	—	May 25, 2006	Kitt Peak	Spacewatch	·	920 m	MPC; JPL
445922	2012 XF_{106}	—	October 15, 2004	Kitt Peak	Spacewatch	·	1.4 km	MPC; JPL
445923	2012 XB_{113}	—	January 29, 2003	Kitt Peak	Spacewatch	(2076)	780 m	MPC; JPL
445924	2012 XN_{117}	—	October 9, 2007	Anderson Mesa	LONEOS	EUN	1.3 km	MPC; JPL
445925	2012 XU_{119}	—	January 3, 2000	Kitt Peak	Spacewatch	·	1.9 km	MPC; JPL
445926	2012 XD_{120}	—	December 18, 2001	Socorro	LINEAR	·	1.3 km	MPC; JPL
445927	2012 XB_{124}	—	October 2, 2008	Mount Lemmon	Mount Lemmon Survey	·	890 m	MPC; JPL
445928	2012 XY_{138}	—	December 5, 2012	Mount Lemmon	Mount Lemmon Survey	·	1.2 km	MPC; JPL
445929	2012 XD_{145}	—	October 23, 2004	Kitt Peak	Spacewatch	MAS	690 m	MPC; JPL
445930	2013 AR_{4}	—	March 9, 2005	Kitt Peak	Spacewatch	·	1.1 km	MPC; JPL
445931	2013 AA_{6}	—	December 20, 2009	Mount Lemmon	Mount Lemmon Survey	·	610 m	MPC; JPL
445932	2013 AN_{11}	—	October 2, 2008	Mount Lemmon	Mount Lemmon Survey	·	620 m	MPC; JPL
445933	2013 AJ_{15}	—	October 16, 2003	Kitt Peak	Spacewatch	·	1.6 km	MPC; JPL
445934	2013 AX_{24}	—	September 9, 2008	Mount Lemmon	Mount Lemmon Survey	·	1.1 km	MPC; JPL
445935	2013 AE_{33}	—	December 19, 2004	Anderson Mesa	LONEOS	EUN	1.5 km	MPC; JPL
445936	2013 AQ_{33}	—	November 3, 2008	Mount Lemmon	Mount Lemmon Survey	·	1.6 km	MPC; JPL
445937	2013 AR_{35}	—	September 4, 2008	Kitt Peak	Spacewatch	·	680 m	MPC; JPL
445938	2013 AY_{39}	—	January 5, 2013	Kitt Peak	Spacewatch	·	1.7 km	MPC; JPL
445939	2013 AG_{43}	—	March 2, 1995	Kitt Peak	Spacewatch	·	1.6 km	MPC; JPL
445940	2013 AE_{44}	—	January 3, 2013	Catalina	CSS	·	1.6 km	MPC; JPL
445941	2013 AK_{50}	—	May 29, 2011	Mount Lemmon	Mount Lemmon Survey	·	2.3 km	MPC; JPL
445942	2013 AM_{57}	—	November 24, 2008	Mount Lemmon	Mount Lemmon Survey	·	1.0 km	MPC; JPL
445943	2013 AT_{57}	—	February 2, 2005	Kitt Peak	Spacewatch	·	1.3 km	MPC; JPL
445944	2013 AN_{61}	—	September 10, 2004	Kitt Peak	Spacewatch	·	1.1 km	MPC; JPL
445945	2013 AN_{64}	—	November 24, 1997	Kitt Peak	Spacewatch	·	840 m	MPC; JPL
445946	2013 AS_{69}	—	October 22, 2008	Kitt Peak	Spacewatch	V	690 m	MPC; JPL
445947	2013 AR_{70}	—	January 3, 2013	Mount Lemmon	Mount Lemmon Survey	V	640 m	MPC; JPL
445948	2013 AU_{70}	—	April 2, 2005	Kitt Peak	Spacewatch	·	1.3 km	MPC; JPL
445949	2013 AX_{70}	—	January 19, 2004	Kitt Peak	Spacewatch	·	1.6 km	MPC; JPL
445950	2013 AU_{74}	—	March 23, 2006	Catalina	CSS	PHO	930 m	MPC; JPL
445951	2013 AS_{75}	—	November 3, 2008	Mount Lemmon	Mount Lemmon Survey	·	960 m	MPC; JPL
445952	2013 AR_{78}	—	October 31, 2008	Catalina	CSS	PHO	930 m	MPC; JPL
445953	2013 AA_{84}	—	February 12, 2002	Kitt Peak	Spacewatch	NYS	1.1 km	MPC; JPL
445954	2013 AL_{86}	—	December 24, 2005	Kitt Peak	Spacewatch	V	570 m	MPC; JPL
445955	2013 AS_{88}	—	November 10, 2004	Kitt Peak	Spacewatch	NYS	1.4 km	MPC; JPL
445956	2013 AK_{89}	—	November 1, 2008	Mount Lemmon	Mount Lemmon Survey	·	1.5 km	MPC; JPL
445957	2013 AM_{89}	—	September 30, 2005	Catalina	CSS	·	950 m	MPC; JPL
445958	2013 AR_{90}	—	January 15, 2013	Catalina	CSS	·	1.2 km	MPC; JPL
445959	2013 AJ_{97}	—	December 29, 2008	Kitt Peak	Spacewatch	·	1.1 km	MPC; JPL
445960	2013 AW_{99}	—	September 8, 2011	Kitt Peak	Spacewatch	V	820 m	MPC; JPL
445961	2013 AR_{102}	—	January 5, 2013	Kitt Peak	Spacewatch	·	3.0 km	MPC; JPL
445962	2013 AW_{104}	—	December 28, 2003	Socorro	LINEAR	·	2.0 km	MPC; JPL
445963	2013 AG_{112}	—	November 17, 2004	Campo Imperatore	CINEOS	·	1.2 km	MPC; JPL
445964	2013 AW_{115}	—	December 3, 2000	Kitt Peak	Spacewatch	·	1.3 km	MPC; JPL
445965	2013 AY_{115}	—	January 3, 2009	Mount Lemmon	Mount Lemmon Survey	·	1.9 km	MPC; JPL
445966	2013 AE_{122}	—	March 11, 2005	Mount Lemmon	Mount Lemmon Survey	·	1.3 km	MPC; JPL
445967	2013 AN_{125}	—	September 23, 2008	Kitt Peak	Spacewatch	·	810 m	MPC; JPL
445968	2013 AX_{128}	—	October 13, 2007	Catalina	CSS	(5)	1.4 km	MPC; JPL
445969	2013 AP_{130}	—	January 28, 2006	Kitt Peak	Spacewatch	·	850 m	MPC; JPL
445970	2013 AV_{132}	—	December 21, 2008	Catalina	CSS	NYS	1.2 km	MPC; JPL
445971	2013 BZ_{7}	—	January 16, 2005	Kitt Peak	Spacewatch	·	1.4 km	MPC; JPL
445972	2013 BE_{9}	—	June 27, 2010	WISE	WISE	·	2.7 km	MPC; JPL
445973	2013 BO_{14}	—	January 17, 2013	Mount Lemmon	Mount Lemmon Survey	EOS	1.5 km	MPC; JPL
445974	2013 BJ_{18}	—	January 16, 2013	Haleakala	Pan-STARRS 1	APO · PHA	310 m	MPC; JPL
445975	2013 BM_{21}	—	March 5, 2006	Kitt Peak	Spacewatch	·	930 m	MPC; JPL
445976	2013 BV_{21}	—	April 19, 2010	WISE	WISE	·	2.0 km	MPC; JPL
445977	2013 BD_{24}	—	December 1, 2008	Mount Lemmon	Mount Lemmon Survey	·	1.3 km	MPC; JPL
445978	2013 BD_{34}	—	December 7, 2005	Catalina	CSS	·	680 m	MPC; JPL
445979	2013 BE_{35}	—	February 25, 2006	Kitt Peak	Spacewatch	·	1.0 km	MPC; JPL
445980	2013 BL_{43}	—	April 9, 2006	Kitt Peak	Spacewatch	NYS	1.3 km	MPC; JPL
445981	2013 BS_{44}	—	September 13, 2007	Catalina	CSS	·	1.5 km	MPC; JPL
445982	2013 BV_{46}	—	January 5, 2013	Kitt Peak	Spacewatch	·	2.2 km	MPC; JPL
445983	2013 BY_{46}	—	November 3, 2004	Kitt Peak	Spacewatch	·	1.2 km	MPC; JPL
445984	2013 BB_{55}	—	November 20, 2003	Kitt Peak	Spacewatch	·	1.4 km	MPC; JPL
445985	2013 BY_{59}	—	March 3, 2005	Catalina	CSS	·	1.6 km	MPC; JPL
445986	2013 BB_{60}	—	September 28, 2000	Kitt Peak	Spacewatch	·	1.1 km	MPC; JPL
445987	2013 BA_{69}	—	January 7, 2006	Mount Lemmon	Mount Lemmon Survey	·	880 m	MPC; JPL
445988	2013 BJ_{71}	—	November 20, 2008	Mount Lemmon	Mount Lemmon Survey	MAR	940 m	MPC; JPL
445989	2013 BE_{77}	—	December 11, 2004	Kitt Peak	Spacewatch	·	1.1 km	MPC; JPL
445990	2013 BY_{78}	—	January 27, 2006	Mount Lemmon	Mount Lemmon Survey	·	680 m	MPC; JPL
445991	2013 CZ_{1}	—	September 4, 2010	Mount Lemmon	Mount Lemmon Survey	EOS	1.9 km	MPC; JPL
445992	2013 CW_{2}	—	November 20, 2008	Kitt Peak	Spacewatch	·	1.7 km	MPC; JPL
445993	2013 CY_{4}	—	August 24, 2007	Kitt Peak	Spacewatch	·	920 m	MPC; JPL
445994	2013 CD_{12}	—	April 4, 2008	Catalina	CSS	LIX	3.3 km	MPC; JPL
445995	2013 CZ_{14}	—	March 31, 2005	Kitt Peak	Spacewatch	·	2.0 km	MPC; JPL
445996	2013 CW_{16}	—	November 13, 2007	Kitt Peak	Spacewatch	·	1.4 km	MPC; JPL
445997	2013 CG_{19}	—	August 21, 2006	Kitt Peak	Spacewatch	·	2.0 km	MPC; JPL
445998	2013 CP_{19}	—	September 28, 2008	Socorro	LINEAR	·	710 m	MPC; JPL
445999	2013 CE_{20}	—	March 5, 2002	Kitt Peak	Spacewatch	·	1.1 km	MPC; JPL
446000	2013 CV_{20}	—	January 4, 2013	Mount Lemmon	Mount Lemmon Survey	NYS	1.1 km	MPC; JPL

back to top

== Meaning of names ==
As minor planet discoveries are confirmed, they are given a permanent number by the IAU's Minor Planet Center (MPC), and the discoverers can then submit names for them, following the IAU's naming conventions. The list below concerns those minor planets in the specified number-range that have received names, and explains the meanings of those names.

Official naming citations of newly named small Solar System bodies are approved and published in a bulletin by IAU's Working Group for Small Bodies Nomenclature (WGSBN). Before May 2021, citations were published in MPC's Minor Planet Circulars for many decades. Recent citations can also be found on the JPL Small-Body Database (SBDB). Until his death in 2016, German astronomer Lutz D. Schmadel compiled these citations into the Dictionary of Minor Planet Names (DMP) and regularly updated the collection.

Based on Paul Herget's The Names of the Minor Planets, Schmadel also researched the unclear origin of numerous asteroids, most of which had been named prior to World War II. This article incorporates text from this source, which is in the public domain: SBDB New namings may only be added to this list below after official publication as the preannouncement of names is condemned. The WGSBN publishes a comprehensive guideline for the naming rules of non-cometary small Solar System bodies.

Named minor planet	Provisional	This minor planet was named for...	Ref; Catalog
445156 Cheeloomed	2008 YH_{31}	The Cheeloo College of Medicine, Shandong University.	IAU · 445156
445308 Volov	2010 ET_{20}	Panayot Volov (c. 1850–1876), a Bulgarian revolutionary, who organized and lead the 1876 insurrection against the Ottoman Empire.	IAU · 445308
445818 Ronbeck	2012 BR_{128}	Ron Beck (born 1955) is an American engineer who specializes in the operations of ground data systems for space missions including Voyager, the Infrared Astronomical Satellite, the Two Micron All-Sky Survey, the Spitzer Space Telescope, the Wide-field Infrared Survey Explorer, and the Zwicky Transient Facility.	IAU · 445818
445917 Ola	2012 XF_{71}	Aleksandra Sufa (born 1998) and Aleksandra Kusiak (born 1957), a friend and the mother of Polish co-discoverer Michal Kusiak, respectively. Ola is a diminutive of name Aleksandra.	JPL · 445917
