= List of minor planets: 843001–844000 =

The following is a partial list of minor planets, running from minor-planet number 843001 through 844000, inclusive. The primary data for this and other partial lists is based on JPL's "Small-Body Orbital Elements" and data available from the Minor Planet Center. Critical list information is also provided by the MPC, unless otherwise specified from Lowell Observatory. A detailed description of the table's columns and additional sources are given on the main page including a complete list of every page in this series, and a statistical break-up on the dynamical classification of minor planets.

Also see the summary list of all named bodies in numerical and alphabetical order, and the corresponding naming citations for the number range of this particular list. New namings may only be added to this list after official publication, as the preannouncement of names is condemned by the Working Group for Small Bodies Nomenclature of the International Astronomical Union.

Near-Earth obj.	MBA (inner)	MBA (outer)	Centaur
Mars-crosser	MBA (middle)	Jupiter trojan	Trans-Neptunian obj.
Unclassified

== 843001–843100 ==
Designation			Discovery			Properties		Ref
Permanent	Provisional	Named after	Date	Site	Discoverer(s)	Category	Diam.	Ref
843001	2016 BO_{12}	—	January 13, 2016	Catalina	CSS	·	990 m	MPC · JPL
843002	2016 BA_{13}	—	October 15, 2004	Moletai	K. Černis, Zdanavicius, J.	·	610 m	MPC · JPL
843003	2016 BX_{14}	—	January 7, 2016	Haleakala	Pan-STARRS 1	APO	200 m	MPC · JPL
843004	2016 BZ_{15}	—	September 18, 2009	Catalina	CSS	·	2.4 km	MPC · JPL
843005	2016 BG_{17}	—	December 10, 2009	Mount Lemmon	Mount Lemmon Survey	·	1.9 km	MPC · JPL
843006	2016 BX_{17}	—	February 20, 2010	WISE	WISE	LIX	2.5 km	MPC · JPL
843007	2016 BZ_{17}	—	March 18, 2010	WISE	WISE	·	3.5 km	MPC · JPL
843008	2016 BS_{18}	—	January 7, 2016	Haleakala	Pan-STARRS 1	·	1.5 km	MPC · JPL
843009	2016 BU_{18}	—	February 13, 2010	WISE	WISE	·	2.9 km	MPC · JPL
843010	2016 BT_{20}	—	January 28, 2016	Mount Lemmon	Mount Lemmon Survey	·	950 m	MPC · JPL
843011	2016 BP_{21}	—	September 23, 2014	Haleakala	Pan-STARRS 1	·	1.9 km	MPC · JPL
843012	2016 BS_{30}	—	March 16, 2009	Catalina	CSS	T_{j} (2.94)	3.7 km	MPC · JPL
843013	2016 BW_{31}	—	March 4, 2010	WISE	WISE	LIX	2.8 km	MPC · JPL
843014	2016 BJ_{32}	—	November 23, 2011	Mount Lemmon	Mount Lemmon Survey	·	770 m	MPC · JPL
843015	2016 BD_{33}	—	February 8, 2010	WISE	WISE	·	2.2 km	MPC · JPL
843016	2016 BC_{34}	—	March 20, 1999	Sacramento Peak	SDSS	·	2.0 km	MPC · JPL
843017	2016 BP_{34}	—	January 8, 2016	Haleakala	Pan-STARRS 1	·	680 m	MPC · JPL
843018	2016 BS_{36}	—	January 16, 2010	WISE	WISE	·	1.7 km	MPC · JPL
843019	2016 BS_{40}	—	March 13, 2010	WISE	WISE	THB	2.0 km	MPC · JPL
843020	2016 BX_{41}	—	April 15, 2012	Haleakala	Pan-STARRS 1	·	1.2 km	MPC · JPL
843021	2016 BM_{43}	—	November 26, 2009	Mount Lemmon	Mount Lemmon Survey	·	1.7 km	MPC · JPL
843022	2016 BE_{48}	—	January 14, 2010	WISE	WISE	·	3.2 km	MPC · JPL
843023	2016 BD_{49}	—	October 1, 2014	Haleakala	Pan-STARRS 1	·	2.2 km	MPC · JPL
843024	2016 BM_{53}	—	August 5, 2010	WISE	WISE	·	1.2 km	MPC · JPL
843025	2016 BH_{55}	—	January 13, 2005	Kitt Peak	Spacewatch	·	2.9 km	MPC · JPL
843026	2016 BV_{55}	—	January 17, 2005	Mauna Kea	Veillet, C.	·	2.0 km	MPC · JPL
843027	2016 BR_{57}	—	January 8, 2016	Haleakala	Pan-STARRS 1	TEL	900 m	MPC · JPL
843028	2016 BB_{61}	—	January 28, 2000	Kitt Peak	Spacewatch	·	1.9 km	MPC · JPL
843029	2016 BZ_{61}	—	January 12, 2016	Haleakala	Pan-STARRS 1	·	2.4 km	MPC · JPL
843030	2016 BW_{62}	—	March 6, 2011	Mount Lemmon	Mount Lemmon Survey	·	1.5 km	MPC · JPL
843031	2016 BV_{63}	—	November 21, 2014	Haleakala	Pan-STARRS 1	·	2.2 km	MPC · JPL
843032	2016 BW_{67}	—	December 19, 2004	Kitt Peak	Spacewatch	·	1.8 km	MPC · JPL
843033	2016 BB_{68}	—	January 31, 2016	Mount Lemmon	Mount Lemmon Survey	·	1.5 km	MPC · JPL
843034	2016 BP_{68}	—	July 29, 2008	Kitt Peak	Spacewatch	·	2.1 km	MPC · JPL
843035	2016 BP_{69}	—	September 24, 2011	Mount Lemmon	Mount Lemmon Survey	·	630 m	MPC · JPL
843036	2016 BT_{69}	—	September 14, 2014	Kitt Peak	Spacewatch	·	2.0 km	MPC · JPL
843037	2016 BG_{74}	—	January 7, 2016	Haleakala	Pan-STARRS 1	(883)	540 m	MPC · JPL
843038	2016 BW_{82}	—	January 16, 2016	Haleakala	Pan-STARRS 1	H	340 m	MPC · JPL
843039	2016 BD_{83}	—	January 17, 2016	Haleakala	Pan-STARRS 1	H	540 m	MPC · JPL
843040	2016 BC_{84}	—	December 19, 2004	Mount Lemmon	Mount Lemmon Survey	·	1.8 km	MPC · JPL
843041	2016 BK_{84}	—	April 12, 2010	WISE	WISE	·	2.8 km	MPC · JPL
843042	2016 BQ_{84}	—	January 17, 2016	Haleakala	Pan-STARRS 1	PHO	760 m	MPC · JPL
843043	2016 BC_{85}	—	January 9, 2007	Mount Lemmon	Mount Lemmon Survey	·	1.1 km	MPC · JPL
843044	2016 BG_{85}	—	May 7, 2010	WISE	WISE	·	2.2 km	MPC · JPL
843045	2016 BL_{86}	—	March 21, 2010	WISE	WISE	T_{j} (2.97)	3.8 km	MPC · JPL
843046	2016 BO_{86}	—	January 29, 2016	Mount Lemmon	Mount Lemmon Survey	·	2.5 km	MPC · JPL
843047	2016 BS_{87}	—	March 16, 2005	Mount Lemmon	Mount Lemmon Survey	EOS	1.9 km	MPC · JPL
843048	2016 BM_{90}	—	May 8, 2010	WISE	WISE	·	2.7 km	MPC · JPL
843049	2016 BM_{92}	—	January 18, 2016	Haleakala	Pan-STARRS 1	·	1.5 km	MPC · JPL
843050	2016 BP_{92}	—	July 14, 2013	Haleakala	Pan-STARRS 1	·	2.0 km	MPC · JPL
843051	2016 BC_{101}	—	January 18, 2016	Haleakala	Pan-STARRS 1	·	1.2 km	MPC · JPL
843052	2016 BU_{102}	—	August 20, 2014	Haleakala	Pan-STARRS 1	·	920 m	MPC · JPL
843053	2016 BZ_{104}	—	January 31, 2016	Haleakala	Pan-STARRS 1	·	1.6 km	MPC · JPL
843054	2016 BE_{106}	—	January 31, 2016	Mount Lemmon	Mount Lemmon Survey	H	360 m	MPC · JPL
843055	2016 BJ_{106}	—	March 14, 2005	Mount Lemmon	Mount Lemmon Survey	·	2.6 km	MPC · JPL
843056	2016 BO_{106}	—	January 18, 2016	Haleakala	Pan-STARRS 1	·	980 m	MPC · JPL
843057	2016 BN_{110}	—	March 13, 2010	WISE	WISE	·	2.7 km	MPC · JPL
843058	2016 BL_{112}	—	August 27, 2014	Haleakala	Pan-STARRS 1	V	460 m	MPC · JPL
843059	2016 BE_{113}	—	January 18, 2016	Haleakala	Pan-STARRS 1	·	590 m	MPC · JPL
843060	2016 BK_{113}	—	January 18, 2016	Mount Lemmon	Mount Lemmon Survey	·	1.0 km	MPC · JPL
843061	2016 BO_{113}	—	January 18, 2016	Haleakala	Pan-STARRS 1	·	1.0 km	MPC · JPL
843062	2016 BR_{116}	—	November 2, 2007	Kitt Peak	Spacewatch	·	850 m	MPC · JPL
843063	2016 BE_{122}	—	January 30, 2016	Mount Lemmon	Mount Lemmon Survey	·	1.3 km	MPC · JPL
843064	2016 BJ_{124}	—	January 17, 2016	Haleakala	Pan-STARRS 1	·	1.5 km	MPC · JPL
843065	2016 BO_{134}	—	January 18, 2016	Haleakala	Pan-STARRS 1	·	950 m	MPC · JPL
843066	2016 BT_{134}	—	January 30, 2016	Mount Lemmon	Mount Lemmon Survey	TIR	2.6 km	MPC · JPL
843067	2016 BZ_{137}	—	January 17, 2016	Haleakala	Pan-STARRS 1	MAR	630 m	MPC · JPL
843068	2016 BA_{146}	—	January 16, 2016	Haleakala	Pan-STARRS 1	L5	5.8 km	MPC · JPL
843069	2016 BR_{146}	—	January 31, 2016	Mount Lemmon	Mount Lemmon Survey	·	1.1 km	MPC · JPL
843070	2016 CB_{2}	—	March 31, 2010	WISE	WISE	·	3.7 km	MPC · JPL
843071	2016 CL_{3}	—	August 12, 2013	Haleakala	Pan-STARRS 1	EOS	1.4 km	MPC · JPL
843072	2016 CQ_{5}	—	February 5, 2010	WISE	WISE	·	2.0 km	MPC · JPL
843073	2016 CJ_{11}	—	February 26, 2011	Mount Lemmon	Mount Lemmon Survey	·	1.1 km	MPC · JPL
843074	2016 CM_{13}	—	November 25, 2011	Haleakala	Pan-STARRS 1	·	900 m	MPC · JPL
843075	2016 CM_{17}	—	September 6, 2008	Mount Lemmon	Mount Lemmon Survey	·	2.0 km	MPC · JPL
843076	2016 CB_{19}	—	January 7, 2016	Haleakala	Pan-STARRS 1	·	2.1 km	MPC · JPL
843077	2016 CA_{23}	—	February 10, 2010	WISE	WISE	·	2.5 km	MPC · JPL
843078	2016 CJ_{27}	—	April 6, 1999	Kitt Peak	Spacewatch	·	650 m	MPC · JPL
843079	2016 CB_{32}	—	December 9, 2015	Haleakala	Pan-STARRS 1	T_{j} (2.97) · AMO	640 m	MPC · JPL
843080	2016 CG_{33}	—	January 3, 2016	Haleakala	Pan-STARRS 1	·	2.1 km	MPC · JPL
843081	2016 CT_{33}	—	December 6, 2015	Haleakala	Pan-STARRS 1	H	310 m	MPC · JPL
843082	2016 CP_{34}	—	February 25, 2010	WISE	WISE	EUP	3.9 km	MPC · JPL
843083	2016 CA_{36}	—	January 7, 2016	Haleakala	Pan-STARRS 1	·	2.1 km	MPC · JPL
843084	2016 CS_{37}	—	September 24, 2011	Mount Lemmon	Mount Lemmon Survey	NYS	630 m	MPC · JPL
843085	2016 CR_{43}	—	January 14, 2016	Haleakala	Pan-STARRS 1	·	2.8 km	MPC · JPL
843086	2016 CH_{46}	—	December 7, 2015	Haleakala	Pan-STARRS 1	TIR	2.0 km	MPC · JPL
843087	2016 CD_{47}	—	September 20, 2014	Haleakala	Pan-STARRS 1	·	760 m	MPC · JPL
843088	2016 CJ_{47}	—	May 8, 2013	Haleakala	Pan-STARRS 1	NYS	660 m	MPC · JPL
843089	2016 CG_{57}	—	March 21, 1999	Sacramento Peak	SDSS	·	820 m	MPC · JPL
843090	2016 CS_{57}	—	January 18, 2010	WISE	WISE	·	3.4 km	MPC · JPL
843091	2016 CQ_{62}	—	November 26, 2011	Mount Lemmon	Mount Lemmon Survey	·	720 m	MPC · JPL
843092	2016 CS_{65}	—	October 9, 1993	La Silla	E. W. Elst	·	1.0 km	MPC · JPL
843093	2016 CB_{67}	—	September 29, 2009	Mount Lemmon	Mount Lemmon Survey	·	2.2 km	MPC · JPL
843094	2016 CA_{68}	—	February 3, 2016	Haleakala	Pan-STARRS 1	·	1.1 km	MPC · JPL
843095	2016 CW_{72}	—	February 4, 2016	Haleakala	Pan-STARRS 1	EUN	790 m	MPC · JPL
843096	2016 CN_{74}	—	December 7, 2015	Haleakala	Pan-STARRS 1	·	1.4 km	MPC · JPL
843097	2016 CZ_{74}	—	December 26, 2009	Kitt Peak	Spacewatch	·	3.0 km	MPC · JPL
843098	2016 CB_{76}	—	January 13, 2016	Mount Lemmon	Mount Lemmon Survey	·	1.6 km	MPC · JPL
843099	2016 CK_{77}	—	February 5, 2016	Haleakala	Pan-STARRS 1	LUT	2.8 km	MPC · JPL
843100	2016 CA_{78}	—	May 29, 2010	WISE	WISE	·	590 m	MPC · JPL

== 843101–843200 ==
back to top

Designation			Discovery			Properties		Ref
Permanent	Provisional	Named after	Date	Site	Discoverer(s)	Category	Diam.	Ref
843101	2016 CQ_{89}	—	November 2, 2007	Mount Lemmon	Mount Lemmon Survey	SYL	3.3 km	MPC · JPL
843102	2016 CS_{92}	—	February 5, 2016	Haleakala	Pan-STARRS 1	HNS	840 m	MPC · JPL
843103	2016 CT_{94}	—	February 5, 2016	Haleakala	Pan-STARRS 1	·	790 m	MPC · JPL
843104	2016 CE_{95}	—	September 10, 2013	Haleakala	Pan-STARRS 1	·	2.5 km	MPC · JPL
843105	2016 CC_{96}	—	February 5, 2016	Haleakala	Pan-STARRS 1	V	350 m	MPC · JPL
843106	2016 CF_{96}	—	February 16, 2012	Haleakala	Pan-STARRS 1	·	830 m	MPC · JPL
843107	2016 CX_{96}	—	January 4, 2016	Haleakala	Pan-STARRS 1	KON	1.6 km	MPC · JPL
843108	2016 CD_{101}	—	July 16, 2013	Haleakala	Pan-STARRS 1	NAE	2.1 km	MPC · JPL
843109	2016 CA_{102}	—	April 12, 2010	WISE	WISE	LUT	3.2 km	MPC · JPL
843110	2016 CK_{102}	—	February 13, 2010	WISE	WISE	·	1.7 km	MPC · JPL
843111	2016 CZ_{104}	—	October 4, 2014	Mount Lemmon	Mount Lemmon Survey	·	1.4 km	MPC · JPL
843112	2016 CD_{107}	—	December 10, 2014	Mount Lemmon	Mount Lemmon Survey	·	2.8 km	MPC · JPL
843113	2016 CV_{112}	—	April 26, 2006	Kitt Peak	Spacewatch	·	1.7 km	MPC · JPL
843114	2016 CX_{113}	—	January 4, 2016	Haleakala	Pan-STARRS 1	·	710 m	MPC · JPL
843115	2016 CV_{116}	—	April 1, 2010	WISE	WISE	LIX	3.2 km	MPC · JPL
843116	2016 CK_{117}	—	August 15, 2013	Haleakala	Pan-STARRS 1	RAF	790 m	MPC · JPL
843117	2016 CV_{119}	—	August 25, 2014	Haleakala	Pan-STARRS 1	·	2.0 km	MPC · JPL
843118	2016 CK_{124}	—	January 14, 2016	Haleakala	Pan-STARRS 1	EOS	1.5 km	MPC · JPL
843119	2016 CQ_{124}	—	January 15, 2010	Mount Lemmon	Mount Lemmon Survey	LUT	3.1 km	MPC · JPL
843120	2016 CW_{124}	—	January 27, 2012	Mount Lemmon	Mount Lemmon Survey	·	950 m	MPC · JPL
843121	2016 CB_{125}	—	December 16, 2014	Haleakala	Pan-STARRS 1	·	2.4 km	MPC · JPL
843122	2016 CX_{129}	—	March 15, 2008	Kitt Peak	Spacewatch	KON	1.4 km	MPC · JPL
843123	2016 CV_{130}	—	January 4, 2016	Haleakala	Pan-STARRS 1	EOS	1.5 km	MPC · JPL
843124	2016 CG_{132}	—	December 9, 2015	Haleakala	Pan-STARRS 1	INA	1.8 km	MPC · JPL
843125	2016 CQ_{134}	—	January 31, 2009	Mount Lemmon	Mount Lemmon Survey	·	690 m	MPC · JPL
843126	2016 CN_{137}	—	January 4, 2016	Haleakala	Pan-STARRS 1	H	360 m	MPC · JPL
843127	2016 CJ_{138}	—	December 19, 2009	Kitt Peak	Spacewatch	T_{j} (2.98)	2.8 km	MPC · JPL
843128	2016 CK_{138}	—	January 15, 2015	Haleakala	Pan-STARRS 1	·	2.4 km	MPC · JPL
843129	2016 CF_{144}	—	February 7, 2008	Kitt Peak	Spacewatch	·	780 m	MPC · JPL
843130	2016 CN_{147}	—	January 27, 2012	Mount Lemmon	Mount Lemmon Survey	·	1.1 km	MPC · JPL
843131	2016 CS_{148}	—	January 31, 2010	WISE	WISE	·	1.4 km	MPC · JPL
843132	2016 CJ_{152}	—	October 24, 2009	Kitt Peak	Spacewatch	·	1.5 km	MPC · JPL
843133	2016 CS_{154}	—	January 17, 2016	Haleakala	Pan-STARRS 1	·	2.0 km	MPC · JPL
843134	2016 CD_{155}	—	July 25, 2014	Haleakala	Pan-STARRS 1	·	790 m	MPC · JPL
843135	2016 CE_{157}	—	January 19, 2007	Mauna Kea	P. A. Wiegert	·	1.1 km	MPC · JPL
843136	2016 CL_{159}	—	July 19, 2007	Mount Lemmon	Mount Lemmon Survey	NYS	770 m	MPC · JPL
843137	2016 CG_{161}	—	January 7, 2016	Haleakala	Pan-STARRS 1	·	2.8 km	MPC · JPL
843138	2016 CK_{162}	—	March 2, 2006	Kitt Peak	L. H. Wasserman, R. L. Millis	·	470 m	MPC · JPL
843139	2016 CW_{162}	—	January 4, 2016	Haleakala	Pan-STARRS 1	·	490 m	MPC · JPL
843140	2016 CV_{163}	—	December 13, 2015	Haleakala	Pan-STARRS 1	H	400 m	MPC · JPL
843141	2016 CA_{164}	—	December 16, 2006	Mount Lemmon	Mount Lemmon Survey	·	1.5 km	MPC · JPL
843142	2016 CJ_{164}	—	January 13, 2008	Kitt Peak	Spacewatch	H	350 m	MPC · JPL
843143	2016 CT_{165}	—	March 19, 2009	Kitt Peak	Spacewatch	NYS	820 m	MPC · JPL
843144	2016 CV_{165}	—	March 19, 2010	WISE	WISE	·	3.0 km	MPC · JPL
843145	2016 CP_{166}	—	November 7, 2007	Mount Lemmon	Mount Lemmon Survey	NYS	910 m	MPC · JPL
843146	2016 CQ_{169}	—	September 19, 1998	Sacramento Peak	SDSS	·	1.6 km	MPC · JPL
843147	2016 CW_{172}	—	January 3, 2016	Haleakala	Pan-STARRS 1	·	1.1 km	MPC · JPL
843148	2016 CY_{175}	—	November 26, 2003	Kitt Peak	Spacewatch	·	2.2 km	MPC · JPL
843149	2016 CC_{177}	—	March 11, 2010	WISE	WISE	URS	2.7 km	MPC · JPL
843150	2016 CX_{178}	—	January 9, 2016	Haleakala	Pan-STARRS 1	·	2.1 km	MPC · JPL
843151	2016 CD_{180}	—	March 12, 2007	Kitt Peak	Spacewatch	·	1.5 km	MPC · JPL
843152	2016 CE_{183}	—	October 25, 2011	Front Royal	Skillman, D. R.	·	940 m	MPC · JPL
843153	2016 CB_{184}	—	February 27, 2010	WISE	WISE	LIX	2.3 km	MPC · JPL
843154	2016 CR_{187}	—	January 11, 2016	Haleakala	Pan-STARRS 1	EUP	2.8 km	MPC · JPL
843155	2016 CF_{189}	—	February 17, 2010	Kitt Peak	Spacewatch	·	2.7 km	MPC · JPL
843156	2016 CH_{191}	—	May 8, 2013	Haleakala	Pan-STARRS 1	·	520 m	MPC · JPL
843157	2016 CA_{196}	—	December 19, 2004	Mount Lemmon	Mount Lemmon Survey	NYS	830 m	MPC · JPL
843158	2016 CE_{201}	—	March 16, 2012	Mount Lemmon	Mount Lemmon Survey	·	1.2 km	MPC · JPL
843159	2016 CV_{202}	—	September 10, 2007	Kitt Peak	Spacewatch	MAS	530 m	MPC · JPL
843160	2016 CP_{211}	—	March 20, 1999	Sacramento Peak	SDSS	·	3.1 km	MPC · JPL
843161	2016 CE_{220}	—	March 15, 2012	Mount Lemmon	Mount Lemmon Survey	·	1.1 km	MPC · JPL
843162	2016 CQ_{221}	—	February 9, 2016	Haleakala	Pan-STARRS 1	VER	2.2 km	MPC · JPL
843163	2016 CV_{222}	—	February 12, 2010	WISE	WISE	·	2.3 km	MPC · JPL
843164	2016 CW_{222}	—	February 6, 2010	WISE	WISE	·	2.1 km	MPC · JPL
843165	2016 CU_{223}	—	March 2, 2011	Kitt Peak	Spacewatch	·	2.5 km	MPC · JPL
843166	2016 CG_{224}	—	October 22, 2003	Sacramento Peak	SDSS	·	2.1 km	MPC · JPL
843167	2016 CG_{230}	—	November 20, 2003	Kitt Peak	Spacewatch	THB	2.5 km	MPC · JPL
843168	2016 CX_{231}	—	January 17, 2010	WISE	WISE	·	4.6 km	MPC · JPL
843169	2016 CO_{233}	—	February 14, 2010	WISE	WISE	·	1.7 km	MPC · JPL
843170	2016 CG_{241}	—	March 12, 2010	WISE	WISE	EUP	2.5 km	MPC · JPL
843171	2016 CN_{241}	—	October 29, 2003	Kitt Peak	Spacewatch	·	2.6 km	MPC · JPL
843172	2016 CZ_{244}	—	February 10, 2016	Haleakala	Pan-STARRS 1	T_{j} (2.99) · (895)	3.5 km	MPC · JPL
843173	2016 CV_{245}	—	February 10, 2016	Haleakala	Pan-STARRS 1	·	1.1 km	MPC · JPL
843174	2016 CC_{247}	—	January 7, 2016	Haleakala	Pan-STARRS 1	·	450 m	MPC · JPL
843175	2016 CW_{250}	—	September 2, 2014	Haleakala	Pan-STARRS 1	·	720 m	MPC · JPL
843176	2016 CG_{252}	—	January 14, 2016	Haleakala	Pan-STARRS 1	MAS	480 m	MPC · JPL
843177	2016 CU_{255}	—	February 19, 2010	WISE	WISE	·	3.3 km	MPC · JPL
843178	2016 CD_{260}	—	February 9, 2005	Kitt Peak	Spacewatch	·	1.9 km	MPC · JPL
843179	2016 CK_{260}	—	February 27, 2012	Haleakala	Pan-STARRS 1	·	930 m	MPC · JPL
843180	2016 CA_{261}	—	February 11, 2016	Haleakala	Pan-STARRS 1	·	1.1 km	MPC · JPL
843181	2016 CF_{261}	—	May 24, 2010	WISE	WISE	·	3.3 km	MPC · JPL
843182	2016 CC_{262}	—	February 1, 2016	Haleakala	Pan-STARRS 1	NYS	730 m	MPC · JPL
843183	2016 CO_{262}	—	March 30, 2010	WISE	WISE	EUP	2.9 km	MPC · JPL
843184	2016 CH_{265}	—	February 4, 2016	Haleakala	Pan-STARRS 1	H	390 m	MPC · JPL
843185	2016 CP_{265}	—	August 20, 2014	Haleakala	Pan-STARRS 1	H	410 m	MPC · JPL
843186	2016 CU_{266}	—	February 3, 2016	Haleakala	Pan-STARRS 1	H	380 m	MPC · JPL
843187	2016 CL_{269}	—	May 12, 2010	WISE	WISE	·	3.1 km	MPC · JPL
843188	2016 CP_{271}	—	February 27, 2010	WISE	WISE	·	2.3 km	MPC · JPL
843189	2016 CZ_{272}	—	April 26, 2011	Mount Lemmon	Mount Lemmon Survey	·	2.3 km	MPC · JPL
843190	2016 CH_{275}	—	June 7, 2010	WISE	WISE	·	2.0 km	MPC · JPL
843191	2016 CK_{275}	—	May 1, 2010	WISE	WISE	·	2.2 km	MPC · JPL
843192	2016 CQ_{276}	—	March 21, 1999	Sacramento Peak	SDSS	·	2.4 km	MPC · JPL
843193	2016 CU_{276}	—	January 11, 2010	Kitt Peak	Spacewatch	·	3.0 km	MPC · JPL
843194	2016 CV_{276}	—	March 18, 2010	Kitt Peak	Spacewatch	T_{j} (2.99) · EUP	2.5 km	MPC · JPL
843195	2016 CJ_{278}	—	March 9, 2005	Mount Lemmon	Mount Lemmon Survey	·	2.0 km	MPC · JPL
843196	2016 CK_{282}	—	October 18, 2009	Mount Lemmon	Mount Lemmon Survey	·	1.6 km	MPC · JPL
843197	2016 CV_{285}	—	February 23, 2012	Mount Lemmon	Mount Lemmon Survey	·	910 m	MPC · JPL
843198	2016 CV_{294}	—	March 25, 2003	Kitt Peak	Spacewatch	·	1.4 km	MPC · JPL
843199	2016 CV_{295}	—	February 2, 2016	Haleakala	Pan-STARRS 1	·	2.0 km	MPC · JPL
843200	2016 CT_{298}	—	March 12, 2010	WISE	WISE	EMA	2.2 km	MPC · JPL

== 843201–843300 ==
back to top

Designation			Discovery			Properties		Ref
Permanent	Provisional	Named after	Date	Site	Discoverer(s)	Category	Diam.	Ref
843201	2016 CF_{311}	—	November 11, 2001	Sacramento Peak	SDSS	·	1.1 km	MPC · JPL
843202	2016 CX_{311}	—	June 7, 2013	Haleakala	Pan-STARRS 1	·	600 m	MPC · JPL
843203	2016 CB_{317}	—	February 11, 2016	Haleakala	Pan-STARRS 1	·	540 m	MPC · JPL
843204	2016 CZ_{317}	—	March 11, 2008	Mount Lemmon	Mount Lemmon Survey	·	770 m	MPC · JPL
843205	2016 CP_{318}	—	March 18, 2010	Mount Lemmon	Mount Lemmon Survey	·	2.4 km	MPC · JPL
843206	2016 CS_{323}	—	February 11, 2016	Haleakala	Pan-STARRS 1	·	1.6 km	MPC · JPL
843207	2016 CC_{325}	—	February 13, 2016	Mount Lemmon	Mount Lemmon Survey	·	850 m	MPC · JPL
843208	2016 CE_{325}	—	February 11, 2016	Haleakala	Pan-STARRS 1	·	2.6 km	MPC · JPL
843209	2016 CH_{325}	—	February 10, 2016	Haleakala	Pan-STARRS 1	H	370 m	MPC · JPL
843210	2016 CQ_{326}	—	May 16, 2012	Mount Lemmon	Mount Lemmon Survey	·	950 m	MPC · JPL
843211	2016 CH_{327}	—	February 11, 2016	Haleakala	Pan-STARRS 1	·	760 m	MPC · JPL
843212	2016 CO_{330}	—	January 11, 2010	Kitt Peak	Spacewatch	·	2.5 km	MPC · JPL
843213	2016 CU_{330}	—	September 1, 2013	Haleakala	Pan-STARRS 1	·	2.5 km	MPC · JPL
843214	2016 CD_{331}	—	May 27, 2010	WISE	WISE	·	2.8 km	MPC · JPL
843215	2016 CE_{331}	—	May 7, 2010	WISE	WISE	(895)	3.5 km	MPC · JPL
843216	2016 CM_{331}	—	February 6, 2016	Mount Lemmon	Mount Lemmon Survey	·	3.1 km	MPC · JPL
843217	2016 CM_{332}	—	February 5, 2016	Haleakala	Pan-STARRS 1	·	1.0 km	MPC · JPL
843218	2016 CH_{341}	—	February 12, 2016	Kitt Peak	Spacewatch	·	570 m	MPC · JPL
843219	2016 CM_{341}	—	February 6, 2016	Mount Lemmon	Mount Lemmon Survey	PHO	540 m	MPC · JPL
843220	2016 CO_{341}	—	February 11, 2016	Haleakala	Pan-STARRS 1	EOS	1.2 km	MPC · JPL
843221	2016 CS_{342}	—	February 5, 2016	Haleakala	Pan-STARRS 1	NYS	780 m	MPC · JPL
843222	2016 CK_{343}	—	February 1, 2016	Haleakala	Pan-STARRS 1	·	1.2 km	MPC · JPL
843223	2016 CO_{346}	—	February 3, 2016	Haleakala	Pan-STARRS 1	EUN	830 m	MPC · JPL
843224	2016 CH_{347}	—	February 10, 2016	Haleakala	Pan-STARRS 1	·	930 m	MPC · JPL
843225	2016 CQ_{357}	—	February 11, 2016	Haleakala	Pan-STARRS 1	·	1.4 km	MPC · JPL
843226	2016 CZ_{360}	—	February 5, 2016	Haleakala	Pan-STARRS 1	·	2.1 km	MPC · JPL
843227	2016 CC_{364}	—	February 10, 2016	Haleakala	Pan-STARRS 1	·	2.0 km	MPC · JPL
843228	2016 CM_{367}	—	February 10, 2016	Haleakala	Pan-STARRS 1	·	790 m	MPC · JPL
843229	2016 CQ_{368}	—	February 5, 2016	Haleakala	Pan-STARRS 1	·	940 m	MPC · JPL
843230	2016 CC_{371}	—	February 3, 2016	Haleakala	Pan-STARRS 1	·	1.4 km	MPC · JPL
843231	2016 CG_{381}	—	September 2, 2010	Mount Lemmon	Mount Lemmon Survey	·	610 m	MPC · JPL
843232	2016 CX_{390}	—	February 5, 2016	Haleakala	Pan-STARRS 1	EOS	1.3 km	MPC · JPL
843233	2016 CH_{392}	—	January 13, 2016	Haleakala	Pan-STARRS 1	·	950 m	MPC · JPL
843234	2016 CV_{394}	—	February 6, 2016	Haleakala	Pan-STARRS 1	·	2.0 km	MPC · JPL
843235	2016 CW_{402}	—	December 10, 2014	Mount Lemmon	Mount Lemmon Survey	·	890 m	MPC · JPL
843236	2016 CP_{430}	—	February 2, 2016	Haleakala	Pan-STARRS 1	·	1.2 km	MPC · JPL
843237	2016 CG_{432}	—	February 9, 2016	Haleakala	Pan-STARRS 1	·	1.1 km	MPC · JPL
843238	2016 CX_{433}	—	February 14, 2016	Mount Lemmon	Mount Lemmon Survey	·	1.2 km	MPC · JPL
843239	2016 DW	—	May 10, 2012	Haleakala	Pan-STARRS 1	·	1.0 km	MPC · JPL
843240	2016 DN_{4}	—	November 23, 2011	Mount Lemmon	Mount Lemmon Survey	·	690 m	MPC · JPL
843241	2016 DV_{5}	—	April 1, 2010	WISE	WISE	·	3.4 km	MPC · JPL
843242	2016 DZ_{6}	—	February 10, 2008	Kitt Peak	Spacewatch	·	760 m	MPC · JPL
843243	2016 DU_{15}	—	March 20, 1999	Sacramento Peak	SDSS	·	1.3 km	MPC · JPL
843244	2016 DZ_{16}	—	January 19, 2012	Kitt Peak	Spacewatch	MAS	480 m	MPC · JPL
843245	2016 DL_{22}	—	February 27, 2016	Mount Lemmon	Mount Lemmon Survey	·	2.3 km	MPC · JPL
843246	2016 DW_{22}	—	October 10, 2002	Sacramento Peak	SDSS	·	2.3 km	MPC · JPL
843247	2016 DC_{24}	—	October 24, 2011	Haleakala	Pan-STARRS 1	·	560 m	MPC · JPL
843248	2016 DZ_{25}	—	January 14, 2016	Haleakala	Pan-STARRS 1	·	750 m	MPC · JPL
843249	2016 DH_{29}	—	February 9, 2016	Mount Lemmon	Mount Lemmon Survey	·	1.0 km	MPC · JPL
843250	2016 DV_{30}	—	September 26, 2000	Sacramento Peak	SDSS	·	2.0 km	MPC · JPL
843251	2016 DB_{32}	—	February 16, 2010	Mount Lemmon	Mount Lemmon Survey	·	2.8 km	MPC · JPL
843252	2016 DW_{35}	—	May 26, 2010	WISE	WISE	PHO	680 m	MPC · JPL
843253	2016 EA_{2}	—	June 24, 2014	Haleakala	Pan-STARRS 1	H	460 m	MPC · JPL
843254	2016 EE_{5}	—	March 20, 1999	Sacramento Peak	SDSS	·	1.8 km	MPC · JPL
843255	2016 EM_{6}	—	January 12, 2016	Haleakala	Pan-STARRS 1	·	2.5 km	MPC · JPL
843256	2016 ET_{6}	—	February 9, 2016	Haleakala	Pan-STARRS 1	·	1.6 km	MPC · JPL
843257	2016 EZ_{7}	—	April 7, 2010	Mount Lemmon	Mount Lemmon Survey	EUP	3.2 km	MPC · JPL
843258	2016 EB_{10}	—	March 3, 2016	Haleakala	Pan-STARRS 1	·	1.7 km	MPC · JPL
843259	2016 EL_{11}	—	January 15, 2010	Mount Lemmon	Mount Lemmon Survey	·	2.5 km	MPC · JPL
843260	2016 EO_{11}	—	March 20, 1999	Sacramento Peak	SDSS	·	2.2 km	MPC · JPL
843261	2016 EK_{16}	—	April 15, 2012	Haleakala	Pan-STARRS 1	EUN	1.1 km	MPC · JPL
843262	2016 EP_{18}	—	January 14, 2011	Mount Lemmon	Mount Lemmon Survey	MAR	830 m	MPC · JPL
843263	2016 EV_{20}	—	February 15, 2016	Haleakala	Pan-STARRS 1	·	1.7 km	MPC · JPL
843264	2016 EC_{21}	—	May 3, 2010	WISE	WISE	·	2.1 km	MPC · JPL
843265	2016 EO_{21}	—	May 18, 2010	WISE	WISE	LUT	2.8 km	MPC · JPL
843266	2016 ET_{23}	—	May 3, 2010	WISE	WISE	·	2.9 km	MPC · JPL
843267	2016 EV_{24}	—	February 12, 2016	Haleakala	Pan-STARRS 1	·	910 m	MPC · JPL
843268	2016 ER_{25}	—	March 3, 2016	Haleakala	Pan-STARRS 1	·	2.3 km	MPC · JPL
843269	2016 EW_{25}	—	May 26, 2010	WISE	WISE	URS	2.6 km	MPC · JPL
843270	2016 ES_{30}	—	January 13, 2016	Haleakala	Pan-STARRS 1	·	2.4 km	MPC · JPL
843271	2016 EE_{33}	—	September 14, 2013	Haleakala	Pan-STARRS 1	·	2.5 km	MPC · JPL
843272	2016 EZ_{33}	—	February 11, 2016	Haleakala	Pan-STARRS 1	·	1.3 km	MPC · JPL
843273	2016 EN_{35}	—	April 24, 2010	WISE	WISE	·	2.8 km	MPC · JPL
843274	2016 ET_{35}	—	April 18, 2010	WISE	WISE	·	2.2 km	MPC · JPL
843275	2016 EV_{39}	—	January 15, 2016	Haleakala	Pan-STARRS 1	·	1.1 km	MPC · JPL
843276	2016 EG_{40}	—	March 4, 2010	WISE	WISE	T_{j} (2.95)	2.5 km	MPC · JPL
843277	2016 EN_{44}	—	January 11, 2016	Haleakala	Pan-STARRS 1	·	800 m	MPC · JPL
843278	2016 EH_{48}	—	September 27, 2008	Mount Lemmon	Mount Lemmon Survey	·	2.6 km	MPC · JPL
843279	2016 EH_{49}	—	April 9, 2010	WISE	WISE	·	2.9 km	MPC · JPL
843280	2016 EQ_{50}	—	November 14, 2014	Kitt Peak	Spacewatch	TIR	2.1 km	MPC · JPL
843281	2016 EF_{54}	—	March 4, 2016	Haleakala	Pan-STARRS 1	·	1.1 km	MPC · JPL
843282	2016 EJ_{57}	—	February 14, 2013	Haleakala	Pan-STARRS 1	H	360 m	MPC · JPL
843283	2016 EM_{58}	—	February 9, 2016	Haleakala	Pan-STARRS 1	·	680 m	MPC · JPL
843284	2016 EJ_{59}	—	April 19, 2009	Catalina	CSS	·	900 m	MPC · JPL
843285	2016 ES_{60}	—	February 27, 2016	Mount Lemmon	Mount Lemmon Survey	·	1.2 km	MPC · JPL
843286	2016 ER_{61}	—	May 1, 2010	WISE	WISE	·	2.4 km	MPC · JPL
843287	2016 EF_{68}	—	April 7, 2010	WISE	WISE	·	2.7 km	MPC · JPL
843288	2016 EW_{70}	—	October 8, 2008	Mount Lemmon	Mount Lemmon Survey	·	2.4 km	MPC · JPL
843289	2016 EJ_{74}	—	January 9, 2016	Haleakala	Pan-STARRS 1	·	2.0 km	MPC · JPL
843290	2016 EF_{75}	—	September 2, 2010	Mount Lemmon	Mount Lemmon Survey	·	770 m	MPC · JPL
843291	2016 EY_{78}	—	March 13, 2010	Mount Lemmon	Mount Lemmon Survey	·	3.0 km	MPC · JPL
843292	2016 EZ_{78}	—	May 27, 2011	Kitt Peak	Spacewatch	·	3.2 km	MPC · JPL
843293 Tănăselia	2016 EU_{80}	Tănăselia	January 8, 2016	Roque de los Muchachos	EURONEAR	BRG	1.1 km	MPC · JPL
843294	2016 EY_{82}	—	April 19, 2010	WISE	WISE	EUP	3.7 km	MPC · JPL
843295	2016 ED_{85}	—	March 4, 2016	Haleakala	Pan-STARRS 1	T_{j} (2.82) · APO +1km	1.1 km	MPC · JPL
843296	2016 EW_{88}	—	October 4, 2014	Mount Lemmon	Mount Lemmon Survey	·	2.2 km	MPC · JPL
843297	2016 EL_{100}	—	September 22, 2008	Kitt Peak	Spacewatch	EOS	1.2 km	MPC · JPL
843298	2016 EM_{101}	—	March 7, 2016	Haleakala	Pan-STARRS 1	TEL	1 km	MPC · JPL
843299	2016 EU_{114}	—	October 10, 2002	Sacramento Peak	SDSS	·	2.5 km	MPC · JPL
843300	2016 EN_{115}	—	January 1, 2009	Kitt Peak	Spacewatch	·	3.2 km	MPC · JPL

== 843301–843400 ==
back to top

Designation			Discovery			Properties		Ref
Permanent	Provisional	Named after	Date	Site	Discoverer(s)	Category	Diam.	Ref
843301	2016 EH_{117}	—	March 10, 2016	Mount Lemmon	Mount Lemmon Survey	KOR	1.1 km	MPC · JPL
843302	2016 EK_{118}	—	April 9, 2010	WISE	WISE	T_{j} (2.95)	2.7 km	MPC · JPL
843303	2016 ES_{127}	—	July 2, 2013	Haleakala	Pan-STARRS 1	·	780 m	MPC · JPL
843304	2016 EC_{130}	—	March 6, 2010	WISE	WISE	·	6.2 km	MPC · JPL
843305	2016 EW_{130}	—	March 10, 2016	Haleakala	Pan-STARRS 1	·	770 m	MPC · JPL
843306	2016 EY_{130}	—	April 15, 2008	Kitt Peak	Spacewatch	·	630 m	MPC · JPL
843307	2016 EV_{131}	—	January 28, 2011	Mount Lemmon	Mount Lemmon Survey	·	1.1 km	MPC · JPL
843308	2016 ED_{140}	—	June 10, 2012	Kitt Peak	Spacewatch	·	1.0 km	MPC · JPL
843309	2016 EB_{142}	—	December 15, 2014	Mount Lemmon	Mount Lemmon Survey	·	1.7 km	MPC · JPL
843310	2016 EZ_{143}	—	September 19, 2014	Haleakala	Pan-STARRS 1	MAS	540 m	MPC · JPL
843311	2016 EC_{146}	—	November 20, 2003	Kitt Peak	Spacewatch	·	1.7 km	MPC · JPL
843312	2016 EL_{149}	—	October 30, 2002	Sacramento Peak	SDSS	·	3.1 km	MPC · JPL
843313	2016 EV_{149}	—	May 17, 2010	WISE	WISE	·	2.4 km	MPC · JPL
843314	2016 EX_{151}	—	April 2, 2010	WISE	WISE	AEG	2.6 km	MPC · JPL
843315	2016 EO_{153}	—	February 10, 2016	Haleakala	Pan-STARRS 1	·	960 m	MPC · JPL
843316	2016 EG_{162}	—	March 10, 2016	Haleakala	Pan-STARRS 1	·	730 m	MPC · JPL
843317	2016 EZ_{164}	—	May 4, 2010	WISE	WISE	·	2.3 km	MPC · JPL
843318	2016 ES_{169}	—	March 10, 2016	Haleakala	Pan-STARRS 1	·	390 m	MPC · JPL
843319	2016 EJ_{170}	—	April 13, 2010	WISE	WISE	EMA	2.4 km	MPC · JPL
843320	2016 EG_{174}	—	March 13, 2011	Kitt Peak	Spacewatch	·	2.6 km	MPC · JPL
843321	2016 EZ_{175}	—	March 10, 2005	Mount Lemmon	Mount Lemmon Survey	·	1.8 km	MPC · JPL
843322	2016 ET_{176}	—	April 2, 2005	Mount Lemmon	Mount Lemmon Survey	·	3.2 km	MPC · JPL
843323	2016 EM_{178}	—	January 19, 2012	Mount Lemmon	Mount Lemmon Survey	·	590 m	MPC · JPL
843324	2016 EV_{179}	—	March 12, 2016	Haleakala	Pan-STARRS 1	·	880 m	MPC · JPL
843325	2016 EY_{180}	—	February 10, 2016	Mount Lemmon	Mount Lemmon Survey	·	840 m	MPC · JPL
843326	2016 EB_{186}	—	April 6, 2010	WISE	WISE	·	2.9 km	MPC · JPL
843327	2016 EE_{190}	—	September 24, 2008	Kitt Peak	Spacewatch	·	2.3 km	MPC · JPL
843328	2016 EN_{193}	—	June 3, 2005	Kitt Peak	Spacewatch	·	2.4 km	MPC · JPL
843329	2016 EQ_{193}	—	April 15, 2010	WISE	WISE	·	2.6 km	MPC · JPL
843330	2016 EU_{193}	—	April 5, 2010	WISE	WISE	T_{j} (2.97)	3.1 km	MPC · JPL
843331	2016 EG_{202}	—	April 29, 2010	WISE	WISE	T_{j} (2.98)	3.1 km	MPC · JPL
843332	2016 EX_{204}	—	March 7, 2016	Haleakala	Pan-STARRS 1	H	310 m	MPC · JPL
843333	2016 ET_{209}	—	May 18, 2010	WISE	WISE	·	2.9 km	MPC · JPL
843334	2016 EN_{210}	—	February 13, 2010	Mount Lemmon	Mount Lemmon Survey	·	3.1 km	MPC · JPL
843335	2016 EP_{210}	—	March 7, 2016	Haleakala	Pan-STARRS 1	·	1.1 km	MPC · JPL
843336	2016 ER_{210}	—	March 7, 2016	Haleakala	Pan-STARRS 1	·	890 m	MPC · JPL
843337	2016 ES_{210}	—	May 12, 2010	WISE	WISE	·	3.1 km	MPC · JPL
843338	2016 EE_{211}	—	March 10, 2016	Haleakala	Pan-STARRS 1	LIX	2.4 km	MPC · JPL
843339	2016 EL_{212}	—	March 10, 2016	Haleakala	Pan-STARRS 1	·	930 m	MPC · JPL
843340	2016 ER_{212}	—	May 24, 2010	WISE	WISE	·	2.8 km	MPC · JPL
843341	2016 EF_{216}	—	May 12, 2010	WISE	WISE	·	2.9 km	MPC · JPL
843342	2016 ET_{216}	—	April 18, 2010	WISE	WISE	·	2.1 km	MPC · JPL
843343	2016 EY_{216}	—	October 6, 2008	Mount Lemmon	Mount Lemmon Survey	EUP	2.4 km	MPC · JPL
843344	2016 EO_{218}	—	April 17, 2010	Kitt Peak	Spacewatch	·	3.2 km	MPC · JPL
843345	2016 EH_{220}	—	June 12, 2010	WISE	WISE	·	3.2 km	MPC · JPL
843346	2016 EB_{222}	—	March 3, 2016	Haleakala	Pan-STARRS 1	·	980 m	MPC · JPL
843347	2016 EJ_{241}	—	September 24, 2013	Mount Lemmon	Mount Lemmon Survey	·	2.1 km	MPC · JPL
843348	2016 ES_{242}	—	October 1, 2013	Mount Lemmon	Mount Lemmon Survey	·	850 m	MPC · JPL
843349	2016 ES_{244}	—	March 13, 2008	Kitt Peak	Spacewatch	·	650 m	MPC · JPL
843350	2016 EV_{245}	—	January 10, 2011	Mount Lemmon	Mount Lemmon Survey	·	1.3 km	MPC · JPL
843351	2016 EF_{246}	—	August 12, 2013	Haleakala	Pan-STARRS 1	·	1.1 km	MPC · JPL
843352	2016 EN_{247}	—	March 13, 2016	Haleakala	Pan-STARRS 1	·	1.5 km	MPC · JPL
843353	2016 EC_{250}	—	October 14, 2001	Sacramento Peak	SDSS	·	2.0 km	MPC · JPL
843354	2016 EB_{252}	—	March 13, 2016	Haleakala	Pan-STARRS 1	·	780 m	MPC · JPL
843355	2016 EC_{252}	—	March 5, 2016	Haleakala	Pan-STARRS 1	EUN	840 m	MPC · JPL
843356	2016 EF_{253}	—	March 12, 2016	Haleakala	Pan-STARRS 1	·	1.2 km	MPC · JPL
843357	2016 EN_{253}	—	March 6, 2016	Haleakala	Pan-STARRS 1	·	960 m	MPC · JPL
843358	2016 EH_{255}	—	August 28, 2013	Mount Lemmon	Mount Lemmon Survey	·	890 m	MPC · JPL
843359	2016 EK_{258}	—	March 10, 2016	Haleakala	Pan-STARRS 1	·	900 m	MPC · JPL
843360	2016 EB_{260}	—	March 10, 2016	Haleakala	Pan-STARRS 1	·	490 m	MPC · JPL
843361	2016 EA_{266}	—	March 11, 2016	Mount Lemmon	Mount Lemmon Survey	VER	2.0 km	MPC · JPL
843362	2016 EQ_{266}	—	March 10, 2016	Haleakala	Pan-STARRS 1	H	390 m	MPC · JPL
843363	2016 EJ_{268}	—	February 26, 2011	Mount Lemmon	Mount Lemmon Survey	·	1.3 km	MPC · JPL
843364	2016 ER_{269}	—	March 6, 2016	Haleakala	Pan-STARRS 1	·	950 m	MPC · JPL
843365	2016 EW_{270}	—	March 6, 2016	Haleakala	Pan-STARRS 1	·	550 m	MPC · JPL
843366	2016 EJ_{273}	—	March 7, 2016	Haleakala	Pan-STARRS 1	·	920 m	MPC · JPL
843367	2016 EE_{274}	—	March 7, 2016	Haleakala	Pan-STARRS 1	·	970 m	MPC · JPL
843368	2016 EF_{274}	—	March 10, 2016	Haleakala	Pan-STARRS 1	·	740 m	MPC · JPL
843369	2016 EZ_{274}	—	March 13, 2016	Haleakala	Pan-STARRS 1	·	2.1 km	MPC · JPL
843370	2016 EL_{280}	—	March 15, 2016	Haleakala	Pan-STARRS 1	·	800 m	MPC · JPL
843371	2016 EJ_{288}	—	March 6, 2016	Haleakala	Pan-STARRS 1	·	820 m	MPC · JPL
843372	2016 EC_{289}	—	March 3, 2016	Haleakala	Pan-STARRS 1	·	1.1 km	MPC · JPL
843373	2016 EM_{289}	—	March 10, 2016	Haleakala	Pan-STARRS 1	KOR	1.1 km	MPC · JPL
843374	2016 EP_{293}	—	March 4, 2016	Haleakala	Pan-STARRS 1	·	2.2 km	MPC · JPL
843375	2016 EY_{293}	—	March 4, 2016	Haleakala	Pan-STARRS 1	EOS	1.2 km	MPC · JPL
843376	2016 EG_{294}	—	March 10, 2016	Haleakala	Pan-STARRS 1	EOS	1.4 km	MPC · JPL
843377	2016 EH_{303}	—	March 7, 2016	Haleakala	Pan-STARRS 1	·	1.6 km	MPC · JPL
843378	2016 EG_{305}	—	March 12, 2016	Haleakala	Pan-STARRS 1	·	1.6 km	MPC · JPL
843379	2016 ET_{309}	—	March 3, 2016	Haleakala	Pan-STARRS 1	·	890 m	MPC · JPL
843380	2016 EA_{310}	—	March 6, 2016	Haleakala	Pan-STARRS 1	·	810 m	MPC · JPL
843381	2016 EW_{310}	—	March 6, 2016	Haleakala	Pan-STARRS 1	·	2.2 km	MPC · JPL
843382	2016 EX_{310}	—	March 10, 2016	Haleakala	Pan-STARRS 1	JUN	660 m	MPC · JPL
843383	2016 EA_{317}	—	March 12, 2016	Haleakala	Pan-STARRS 1	·	430 m	MPC · JPL
843384	2016 EF_{323}	—	March 10, 2016	Haleakala	Pan-STARRS 1	·	580 m	MPC · JPL
843385	2016 EA_{324}	—	March 1, 2016	Haleakala	Pan-STARRS 1	·	2.6 km	MPC · JPL
843386	2016 EV_{345}	—	March 3, 2016	Haleakala	Pan-STARRS 1	·	1.6 km	MPC · JPL
843387	2016 EP_{348}	—	March 2, 2016	Mount Lemmon	Mount Lemmon Survey	·	1.6 km	MPC · JPL
843388	2016 EF_{353}	—	March 30, 2010	WISE	WISE	EOS	1.5 km	MPC · JPL
843389	2016 FM_{1}	—	March 20, 1999	Sacramento Peak	SDSS	EUN	1.2 km	MPC · JPL
843390	2016 FO_{3}	—	March 19, 2016	Mount Lemmon	Mount Lemmon Survey	·	1.1 km	MPC · JPL
843391	2016 FX_{4}	—	September 16, 2003	Kitt Peak	Spacewatch	·	510 m	MPC · JPL
843392	2016 FT_{8}	—	April 15, 2010	WISE	WISE	EUP	3.4 km	MPC · JPL
843393	2016 FS_{9}	—	March 20, 1999	Sacramento Peak	SDSS	EUP	3.2 km	MPC · JPL
843394	2016 FT_{9}	—	April 27, 2010	WISE	WISE	·	3.0 km	MPC · JPL
843395	2016 FK_{10}	—	June 4, 2013	Mount Lemmon	Mount Lemmon Survey	·	500 m	MPC · JPL
843396	2016 FP_{15}	—	April 22, 2013	Mount Lemmon	Mount Lemmon Survey	·	770 m	MPC · JPL
843397	2016 FF_{16}	—	May 4, 2010	WISE	WISE	·	2.1 km	MPC · JPL
843398	2016 FW_{17}	—	April 30, 2012	Kitt Peak	Spacewatch	GEF	860 m	MPC · JPL
843399	2016 FK_{19}	—	May 5, 2010	WISE	WISE	·	2.8 km	MPC · JPL
843400	2016 FB_{20}	—	November 22, 2000	Saji	Observatory, Saji	·	2.2 km	MPC · JPL

== 843401–843500 ==
back to top

Designation			Discovery			Properties		Ref
Permanent	Provisional	Named after	Date	Site	Discoverer(s)	Category	Diam.	Ref
843401	2016 FM_{21}	—	January 15, 2010	WISE	WISE	·	1.3 km	MPC · JPL
843402	2016 FZ_{21}	—	June 1, 2013	Mount Lemmon	Mount Lemmon Survey	·	440 m	MPC · JPL
843403	2016 FH_{29}	—	March 4, 2016	Haleakala	Pan-STARRS 1	·	2.1 km	MPC · JPL
843404	2016 FB_{30}	—	March 31, 2016	Mount Lemmon	Mount Lemmon Survey	HYG	2.3 km	MPC · JPL
843405	2016 FC_{31}	—	April 2, 2009	Kitt Peak	Spacewatch	·	660 m	MPC · JPL
843406	2016 FL_{37}	—	December 31, 2011	Mount Lemmon	Mount Lemmon Survey	·	650 m	MPC · JPL
843407	2016 FF_{38}	—	June 18, 2010	WISE	WISE	·	2.9 km	MPC · JPL
843408	2016 FT_{38}	—	February 17, 2010	Kitt Peak	Spacewatch	·	2.1 km	MPC · JPL
843409	2016 FA_{43}	—	March 31, 2016	Mount Lemmon	Mount Lemmon Survey	·	980 m	MPC · JPL
843410	2016 FR_{43}	—	March 10, 2016	Haleakala	Pan-STARRS 1	·	710 m	MPC · JPL
843411	2016 FO_{47}	—	October 5, 2002	Sacramento Peak	SDSS	EOS	2.0 km	MPC · JPL
843412	2016 FG_{51}	—	April 15, 2012	Haleakala	Pan-STARRS 1	·	720 m	MPC · JPL
843413	2016 FM_{54}	—	February 9, 2016	Haleakala	Pan-STARRS 1	·	1.2 km	MPC · JPL
843414	2016 FW_{54}	—	January 8, 2016	Haleakala	Pan-STARRS 1	·	730 m	MPC · JPL
843415	2016 FX_{54}	—	January 17, 2016	Haleakala	Pan-STARRS 1	·	530 m	MPC · JPL
843416	2016 FB_{55}	—	March 31, 2016	Haleakala	Pan-STARRS 1	V	450 m	MPC · JPL
843417	2016 FL_{55}	—	October 29, 2002	Sacramento Peak	SDSS	·	870 m	MPC · JPL
843418	2016 FL_{65}	—	April 25, 2008	Kitt Peak	Spacewatch	EUN	990 m	MPC · JPL
843419	2016 FV_{65}	—	April 24, 2012	Kitt Peak	Spacewatch	EUN	890 m	MPC · JPL
843420	2016 FP_{69}	—	March 17, 2016	Haleakala	Pan-STARRS 1	·	1.7 km	MPC · JPL
843421	2016 FR_{69}	—	March 17, 2016	Haleakala	Pan-STARRS 1	·	1.1 km	MPC · JPL
843422	2016 FF_{73}	—	March 16, 2016	Haleakala	Pan-STARRS 1	·	840 m	MPC · JPL
843423	2016 FS_{73}	—	March 28, 2016	Mount Lemmon	Mount Lemmon Survey	·	2.1 km	MPC · JPL
843424	2016 FL_{80}	—	March 16, 2016	Haleakala	Pan-STARRS 1	·	1.0 km	MPC · JPL
843425	2016 FK_{84}	—	March 28, 2016	Cerro Tololo	DECam	·	1.4 km	MPC · JPL
843426	2016 FJ_{86}	—	March 29, 2016	Cerro Tololo-DECam	DECam	·	2.3 km	MPC · JPL
843427	2016 FM_{87}	—	March 28, 2016	Cerro Tololo	DECam	·	1.8 km	MPC · JPL
843428	2016 FB_{95}	—	March 31, 2016	Haleakala	Pan-STARRS 1	·	1.9 km	MPC · JPL
843429	2016 FC_{101}	—	March 28, 2016	Cerro Tololo	DECam	·	1.9 km	MPC · JPL
843430	2016 FS_{106}	—	March 28, 2016	Cerro Tololo	DECam	LIX	2.6 km	MPC · JPL
843431	2016 FV_{116}	—	September 5, 2008	Kitt Peak	Spacewatch	·	880 m	MPC · JPL
843432	2016 FZ_{116}	—	March 28, 2016	Cerro Tololo	DECam	·	490 m	MPC · JPL
843433	2016 FH_{121}	—	August 13, 2012	Haleakala	Pan-STARRS 1	·	1.8 km	MPC · JPL
843434	2016 FD_{144}	—	December 11, 2014	Mount Lemmon	Mount Lemmon Survey	·	1.2 km	MPC · JPL
843435	2016 FQ_{151}	—	August 20, 2008	Kitt Peak	Spacewatch	·	1.4 km	MPC · JPL
843436	2016 FR_{157}	—	March 16, 2016	Haleakala	Pan-STARRS 1	·	730 m	MPC · JPL
843437	2016 FF_{166}	—	March 17, 2016	Mount Lemmon	Mount Lemmon Survey	·	2.6 km	MPC · JPL
843438	2016 FQ_{169}	—	March 30, 2016	Cerro Tololo	DECam	·	2.0 km	MPC · JPL
843439	2016 GM_{5}	—	March 20, 1999	Sacramento Peak	SDSS	·	1.0 km	MPC · JPL
843440	2016 GE_{8}	—	April 19, 2012	Mount Lemmon	Mount Lemmon Survey	·	800 m	MPC · JPL
843441	2016 GW_{12}	—	April 2, 2005	Mount Lemmon	Mount Lemmon Survey	·	3.1 km	MPC · JPL
843442	2016 GT_{15}	—	September 3, 2013	Haleakala	Pan-STARRS 1	·	740 m	MPC · JPL
843443	2016 GD_{23}	—	October 7, 2008	Mount Lemmon	Mount Lemmon Survey	·	2.3 km	MPC · JPL
843444	2016 GR_{23}	—	April 1, 2016	Haleakala	Pan-STARRS 1	EOS	1.4 km	MPC · JPL
843445	2016 GO_{27}	—	January 16, 2005	Mauna Kea	Veillet, C.	·	660 m	MPC · JPL
843446	2016 GF_{30}	—	October 25, 2014	Kitt Peak	Spacewatch	·	1.1 km	MPC · JPL
843447	2016 GE_{31}	—	March 10, 2005	Mount Lemmon	Mount Lemmon Survey	·	1.6 km	MPC · JPL
843448	2016 GE_{33}	—	March 28, 2016	Mount Lemmon	Mount Lemmon Survey	·	2.3 km	MPC · JPL
843449	2016 GU_{33}	—	March 21, 1999	Sacramento Peak	SDSS	·	1.0 km	MPC · JPL
843450	2016 GY_{34}	—	August 14, 2013	Haleakala	Pan-STARRS 1	·	800 m	MPC · JPL
843451	2016 GH_{37}	—	March 28, 2016	Mount Lemmon	Mount Lemmon Survey	·	1.3 km	MPC · JPL
843452	2016 GX_{42}	—	April 1, 2016	Haleakala	Pan-STARRS 1	·	820 m	MPC · JPL
843453	2016 GL_{44}	—	May 9, 2004	Kitt Peak	Spacewatch	·	780 m	MPC · JPL
843454	2016 GT_{44}	—	October 17, 2009	Mount Lemmon	Mount Lemmon Survey	·	1.2 km	MPC · JPL
843455	2016 GA_{45}	—	October 7, 2005	Mount Lemmon	Mount Lemmon Survey	·	860 m	MPC · JPL
843456	2016 GS_{49}	—	October 13, 2014	Mount Lemmon	Mount Lemmon Survey	V	440 m	MPC · JPL
843457	2016 GB_{50}	—	March 10, 2016	Haleakala	Pan-STARRS 1	·	530 m	MPC · JPL
843458	2016 GO_{53}	—	May 1, 2012	Mount Lemmon	Mount Lemmon Survey	·	710 m	MPC · JPL
843459	2016 GT_{58}	—	October 8, 2008	Mount Lemmon	Mount Lemmon Survey	·	1.3 km	MPC · JPL
843460	2016 GU_{62}	—	March 10, 2016	Haleakala	Pan-STARRS 1	·	2.0 km	MPC · JPL
843461	2016 GJ_{69}	—	October 5, 2013	Mount Lemmon	Mount Lemmon Survey	KOR	870 m	MPC · JPL
843462	2016 GN_{72}	—	March 30, 2011	Mount Lemmon	Mount Lemmon Survey	·	1.3 km	MPC · JPL
843463	2016 GD_{74}	—	March 10, 2016	Haleakala	Pan-STARRS 1	EOS	1.5 km	MPC · JPL
843464	2016 GT_{80}	—	November 13, 2010	Mount Lemmon	Mount Lemmon Survey	V	450 m	MPC · JPL
843465	2016 GB_{81}	—	September 25, 2006	Kitt Peak	Spacewatch	·	900 m	MPC · JPL
843466	2016 GX_{89}	—	April 1, 2016	Haleakala	Pan-STARRS 1	·	730 m	MPC · JPL
843467	2016 GA_{94}	—	April 1, 2016	Haleakala	Pan-STARRS 1	·	2.2 km	MPC · JPL
843468	2016 GB_{94}	—	February 11, 2016	Haleakala	Pan-STARRS 1	·	1.1 km	MPC · JPL
843469	2016 GK_{95}	—	April 1, 2016	Haleakala	Pan-STARRS 1	·	1.9 km	MPC · JPL
843470	2016 GZ_{99}	—	April 1, 2016	Haleakala	Pan-STARRS 1	·	1.4 km	MPC · JPL
843471	2016 GR_{100}	—	February 16, 2012	Haleakala	Pan-STARRS 1	NYS	770 m	MPC · JPL
843472	2016 GB_{103}	—	April 1, 2016	Haleakala	Pan-STARRS 1	·	1.7 km	MPC · JPL
843473	2016 GK_{112}	—	October 5, 2002	Sacramento Peak	SDSS	·	2.4 km	MPC · JPL
843474	2016 GB_{114}	—	October 18, 2007	Kitt Peak	Spacewatch	·	2.1 km	MPC · JPL
843475	2016 GD_{119}	—	September 3, 2013	Mount Lemmon	Mount Lemmon Survey	·	700 m	MPC · JPL
843476	2016 GA_{124}	—	July 16, 2010	WISE	WISE	T_{j} (2.99) · EUP	2.5 km	MPC · JPL
843477	2016 GM_{124}	—	May 14, 2010	WISE	WISE	·	3.2 km	MPC · JPL
843478	2016 GE_{125}	—	July 29, 2010	WISE	WISE	PHO	670 m	MPC · JPL
843479	2016 GK_{127}	—	April 26, 2010	WISE	WISE	EMA	2.9 km	MPC · JPL
843480	2016 GB_{129}	—	June 7, 2010	WISE	WISE	URS	3.0 km	MPC · JPL
843481	2016 GB_{130}	—	March 20, 2012	Haleakala	Pan-STARRS 1	·	760 m	MPC · JPL
843482	2016 GW_{131}	—	March 12, 2016	Haleakala	Pan-STARRS 1	EOS	1.5 km	MPC · JPL
843483	2016 GF_{132}	—	April 24, 2010	WISE	WISE	·	4.5 km	MPC · JPL
843484	2016 GG_{133}	—	April 2, 2016	Haleakala	Pan-STARRS 1	·	470 m	MPC · JPL
843485	2016 GS_{135}	—	February 15, 2010	Mount Lemmon	Mount Lemmon Survey	LIX	2.5 km	MPC · JPL
843486	2016 GY_{135}	—	February 5, 2016	Haleakala	Pan-STARRS 1	·	1.1 km	MPC · JPL
843487	2016 GQ_{139}	—	April 1, 2016	Haleakala	Pan-STARRS 1	·	900 m	MPC · JPL
843488	2016 GU_{139}	—	April 1, 2016	Haleakala	Pan-STARRS 1	·	990 m	MPC · JPL
843489	2016 GL_{140}	—	May 24, 2010	WISE	WISE	·	2.2 km	MPC · JPL
843490	2016 GT_{140}	—	March 4, 2016	Haleakala	Pan-STARRS 1	·	780 m	MPC · JPL
843491	2016 GX_{143}	—	August 23, 2004	Kitt Peak	Spacewatch	·	1.3 km	MPC · JPL
843492	2016 GA_{146}	—	April 2, 2016	Mount Lemmon	Mount Lemmon Survey	·	2.1 km	MPC · JPL
843493	2016 GM_{147}	—	May 28, 2003	Sacramento Peak	SDSS	H	320 m	MPC · JPL
843494	2016 GZ_{150}	—	November 20, 2009	Kitt Peak	Spacewatch	H	510 m	MPC · JPL
843495	2016 GY_{153}	—	October 3, 2014	Calar Alto	S. Hellmich, S. Mottola	·	1.6 km	MPC · JPL
843496	2016 GK_{155}	—	June 4, 2013	Mount Lemmon	Mount Lemmon Survey	·	510 m	MPC · JPL
843497	2016 GT_{157}	—	August 28, 2006	Kitt Peak	Spacewatch	·	2.2 km	MPC · JPL
843498	2016 GO_{166}	—	January 19, 2007	Mauna Kea	P. A. Wiegert	·	750 m	MPC · JPL
843499	2016 GA_{169}	—	October 29, 2002	Sacramento Peak	SDSS	·	2.7 km	MPC · JPL
843500	2016 GV_{173}	—	October 9, 2007	Kitt Peak	Spacewatch	·	570 m	MPC · JPL

== 843501–843600 ==
back to top

Designation			Discovery			Properties		Ref
Permanent	Provisional	Named after	Date	Site	Discoverer(s)	Category	Diam.	Ref
843501	2016 GB_{179}	—	February 11, 2016	Haleakala	Pan-STARRS 1	·	670 m	MPC · JPL
843502	2016 GP_{179}	—	April 3, 2016	Haleakala	Pan-STARRS 1	·	1.1 km	MPC · JPL
843503	2016 GT_{181}	—	April 3, 2016	Haleakala	Pan-STARRS 1	·	860 m	MPC · JPL
843504	2016 GX_{182}	—	March 31, 2016	Haleakala	Pan-STARRS 1	KON	1.7 km	MPC · JPL
843505	2016 GZ_{182}	—	February 19, 2010	Mount Lemmon	Mount Lemmon Survey	·	2.1 km	MPC · JPL
843506	2016 GD_{183}	—	April 3, 2016	Haleakala	Pan-STARRS 1	(2076)	480 m	MPC · JPL
843507	2016 GL_{183}	—	March 6, 2016	Haleakala	Pan-STARRS 1	·	1.0 km	MPC · JPL
843508	2016 GP_{184}	—	October 22, 2009	Mount Lemmon	Mount Lemmon Survey	·	1.3 km	MPC · JPL
843509	2016 GT_{184}	—	November 20, 2009	Kitt Peak	Spacewatch	·	1.4 km	MPC · JPL
843510	2016 GY_{187}	—	April 3, 2016	Haleakala	Pan-STARRS 1	·	620 m	MPC · JPL
843511	2016 GU_{190}	—	June 30, 2013	Haleakala	Pan-STARRS 1	·	500 m	MPC · JPL
843512	2016 GL_{192}	—	November 23, 2014	Haleakala	Pan-STARRS 1	·	2.7 km	MPC · JPL
843513	2016 GP_{195}	—	November 21, 2003	Kitt Peak	Spacewatch	·	950 m	MPC · JPL
843514	2016 GA_{196}	—	October 2, 2014	Mount Lemmon	Mount Lemmon Survey	·	1.1 km	MPC · JPL
843515	2016 GZ_{199}	—	April 11, 2010	WISE	WISE	TIR	1.8 km	MPC · JPL
843516	2016 GH_{202}	—	March 21, 1999	Sacramento Peak	SDSS	·	3.1 km	MPC · JPL
843517	2016 GF_{203}	—	May 27, 2010	WISE	WISE	·	2.8 km	MPC · JPL
843518	2016 GV_{203}	—	March 10, 2016	Haleakala	Pan-STARRS 1	·	2.0 km	MPC · JPL
843519	2016 GB_{215}	—	July 7, 2010	WISE	WISE	·	2.5 km	MPC · JPL
843520	2016 GD_{215}	—	July 8, 2010	WISE	WISE	(69559)	2.3 km	MPC · JPL
843521	2016 GO_{221}	—	May 6, 2011	Mount Lemmon	Mount Lemmon Survey	H	340 m	MPC · JPL
843522	2016 GK_{227}	—	April 2, 2016	Kitt Peak	Spacewatch	·	610 m	MPC · JPL
843523	2016 GB_{229}	—	May 7, 2005	Mount Lemmon	Mount Lemmon Survey	·	850 m	MPC · JPL
843524	2016 GJ_{231}	—	October 10, 2002	Sacramento Peak	SDSS	·	1.1 km	MPC · JPL
843525	2016 GK_{234}	—	June 8, 2012	Mount Lemmon	Mount Lemmon Survey	RAF	740 m	MPC · JPL
843526	2016 GA_{239}	—	January 18, 2015	Mount Lemmon	Mount Lemmon Survey	·	2.0 km	MPC · JPL
843527	2016 GZ_{239}	—	June 14, 2010	WISE	WISE	·	2.4 km	MPC · JPL
843528	2016 GU_{241}	—	July 11, 1994	La Silla	H. Debehogne, E. W. Elst	·	1.6 km	MPC · JPL
843529	2016 GF_{242}	—	September 26, 2014	Mount Lemmon	Mount Lemmon Survey	·	920 m	MPC · JPL
843530	2016 GN_{245}	—	April 3, 2016	Haleakala	Pan-STARRS 1	·	580 m	MPC · JPL
843531	2016 GQ_{247}	—	May 12, 2010	WISE	WISE	·	2.2 km	MPC · JPL
843532	2016 GQ_{248}	—	April 14, 2010	WISE	WISE	·	2.2 km	MPC · JPL
843533	2016 GB_{249}	—	November 10, 2004	Kitt Peak	Deep Ecliptic Survey	·	480 m	MPC · JPL
843534	2016 GA_{251}	—	March 6, 2016	Haleakala	Pan-STARRS 1	·	580 m	MPC · JPL
843535	2016 GG_{251}	—	March 16, 2016	Haleakala	Pan-STARRS 1	·	890 m	MPC · JPL
843536	2016 GY_{254}	—	April 1, 2016	Haleakala	Pan-STARRS 1	·	1.1 km	MPC · JPL
843537	2016 GL_{262}	—	April 2, 2016	Haleakala	Pan-STARRS 1	·	2.3 km	MPC · JPL
843538	2016 GV_{265}	—	April 11, 2016	Haleakala	Pan-STARRS 1	·	1.1 km	MPC · JPL
843539	2016 GO_{268}	—	April 1, 2016	Haleakala	Pan-STARRS 1	ADE	1.3 km	MPC · JPL
843540	2016 GD_{269}	—	April 5, 2016	Haleakala	Pan-STARRS 1	·	860 m	MPC · JPL
843541	2016 GE_{269}	—	April 1, 2016	Haleakala	Pan-STARRS 1	·	510 m	MPC · JPL
843542	2016 GF_{269}	—	August 28, 2006	Anderson Mesa	LONEOS	·	1.8 km	MPC · JPL
843543	2016 GO_{269}	—	January 30, 2010	WISE	WISE	·	1.7 km	MPC · JPL
843544	2016 GH_{270}	—	April 3, 2016	Haleakala	Pan-STARRS 1	·	1.3 km	MPC · JPL
843545	2016 GP_{270}	—	April 15, 2016	Haleakala	Pan-STARRS 1	·	830 m	MPC · JPL
843546	2016 GH_{271}	—	April 1, 2016	Haleakala	Pan-STARRS 1	·	960 m	MPC · JPL
843547	2016 GT_{273}	—	April 15, 2016	Haleakala	Pan-STARRS 1	·	910 m	MPC · JPL
843548	2016 GV_{275}	—	May 18, 2010	WISE	WISE	·	2.5 km	MPC · JPL
843549	2016 GW_{275}	—	April 5, 2016	Haleakala	Pan-STARRS 1	·	1.2 km	MPC · JPL
843550	2016 GW_{276}	—	May 3, 2008	Mount Lemmon	Mount Lemmon Survey	·	760 m	MPC · JPL
843551	2016 GU_{279}	—	April 12, 2016	Haleakala	Pan-STARRS 1	·	1.1 km	MPC · JPL
843552	2016 GN_{281}	—	April 4, 2016	Haleakala	Pan-STARRS 1	·	820 m	MPC · JPL
843553	2016 GX_{281}	—	April 11, 2016	Haleakala	Pan-STARRS 1	·	960 m	MPC · JPL
843554	2016 GE_{282}	—	April 2, 2016	Kitt Peak	Spacewatch	·	570 m	MPC · JPL
843555	2016 GN_{283}	—	April 11, 2016	Haleakala	Pan-STARRS 1	MAR	600 m	MPC · JPL
843556	2016 GY_{283}	—	April 5, 2016	Haleakala	Pan-STARRS 1	·	900 m	MPC · JPL
843557	2016 GZ_{284}	—	April 2, 2016	Haleakala	Pan-STARRS 1	·	890 m	MPC · JPL
843558	2016 GD_{288}	—	April 9, 2016	Haleakala	Pan-STARRS 1	·	700 m	MPC · JPL
843559	2016 GV_{289}	—	April 5, 2016	Haleakala	Pan-STARRS 1	·	800 m	MPC · JPL
843560	2016 GU_{290}	—	April 10, 2016	Haleakala	Pan-STARRS 1	·	1.0 km	MPC · JPL
843561	2016 GH_{297}	—	April 9, 2016	Haleakala	Pan-STARRS 1	EOS	1.6 km	MPC · JPL
843562	2016 GK_{298}	—	April 3, 2016	Mount Lemmon	Mount Lemmon Survey	DOR	1.7 km	MPC · JPL
843563	2016 GL_{298}	—	April 12, 2016	Haleakala	Pan-STARRS 1	·	2.0 km	MPC · JPL
843564	2016 GP_{298}	—	January 20, 2015	Haleakala	Pan-STARRS 1	·	2.3 km	MPC · JPL
843565	2016 GU_{300}	—	April 5, 2016	Haleakala	Pan-STARRS 1	·	710 m	MPC · JPL
843566	2016 GQ_{301}	—	March 10, 2016	Haleakala	Pan-STARRS 1	·	520 m	MPC · JPL
843567	2016 GU_{304}	—	April 11, 2016	Haleakala	Pan-STARRS 1	·	1.1 km	MPC · JPL
843568	2016 GH_{310}	—	April 10, 2016	Haleakala	Pan-STARRS 1	·	720 m	MPC · JPL
843569	2016 GQ_{313}	—	April 1, 2016	Haleakala	Pan-STARRS 1	·	1.0 km	MPC · JPL
843570	2016 GP_{314}	—	April 5, 2016	Haleakala	Pan-STARRS 1	·	830 m	MPC · JPL
843571	2016 GL_{316}	—	November 21, 2014	Haleakala	Pan-STARRS 1	·	470 m	MPC · JPL
843572	2016 GP_{320}	—	October 9, 2008	Mount Lemmon	Mount Lemmon Survey	EOS	1.2 km	MPC · JPL
843573	2016 GV_{320}	—	January 18, 2015	Mount Lemmon	Mount Lemmon Survey	·	1.7 km	MPC · JPL
843574	2016 GV_{323}	—	April 12, 2016	Haleakala	Pan-STARRS 1	·	2.2 km	MPC · JPL
843575	2016 GT_{327}	—	April 2, 2016	Haleakala	Pan-STARRS 1	·	720 m	MPC · JPL
843576	2016 GX_{328}	—	April 2, 2016	Mount Lemmon	Mount Lemmon Survey	·	2.1 km	MPC · JPL
843577	2016 GK_{334}	—	April 3, 2016	Haleakala	Pan-STARRS 1	·	1.8 km	MPC · JPL
843578	2016 GX_{351}	—	April 5, 2016	Haleakala	Pan-STARRS 1	·	1.1 km	MPC · JPL
843579	2016 GS_{352}	—	April 1, 2016	Haleakala	Pan-STARRS 1	·	2.3 km	MPC · JPL
843580	2016 GF_{356}	—	April 2, 2016	Haleakala	Pan-STARRS 1	EOS	1.3 km	MPC · JPL
843581	2016 HB_{2}	—	October 28, 2008	Kitt Peak	Spacewatch	·	2.8 km	MPC · JPL
843582	2016 HS_{2}	—	May 14, 2010	WISE	WISE	·	3.2 km	MPC · JPL
843583	2016 HK_{3}	—	February 10, 2016	Haleakala	Pan-STARRS 1	·	1.1 km	MPC · JPL
843584	2016 HL_{5}	—	March 21, 1999	Sacramento Peak	SDSS	·	930 m	MPC · JPL
843585	2016 HO_{5}	—	January 14, 2015	Haleakala	Pan-STARRS 1	·	1.4 km	MPC · JPL
843586	2016 HN_{8}	—	April 29, 2016	Mount Lemmon	Mount Lemmon Survey	·	1.2 km	MPC · JPL
843587	2016 HQ_{9}	—	April 29, 2012	Kitt Peak	Spacewatch	·	910 m	MPC · JPL
843588	2016 HY_{12}	—	December 29, 2014	Haleakala	Pan-STARRS 1	HOF	1.8 km	MPC · JPL
843589	2016 HF_{13}	—	March 31, 2010	WISE	WISE	·	1.6 km	MPC · JPL
843590	2016 HV_{13}	—	April 30, 2016	Haleakala	Pan-STARRS 1	·	980 m	MPC · JPL
843591	2016 HT_{14}	—	July 15, 2013	Haleakala	Pan-STARRS 1	·	880 m	MPC · JPL
843592	2016 HV_{18}	—	December 21, 2014	Haleakala	Pan-STARRS 1	HOF	1.8 km	MPC · JPL
843593	2016 HT_{22}	—	October 21, 2008	Kitt Peak	Spacewatch	LIX	3.1 km	MPC · JPL
843594	2016 HM_{24}	—	June 16, 2010	WISE	WISE	T_{j} (2.97)	3.3 km	MPC · JPL
843595	2016 HV_{24}	—	November 23, 2006	Mount Lemmon	Mount Lemmon Survey	T_{j} (2.98) · EUP	4.5 km	MPC · JPL
843596	2016 HD_{25}	—	November 16, 2014	Mount Lemmon	Mount Lemmon Survey	·	790 m	MPC · JPL
843597	2016 HJ_{26}	—	April 21, 2016	Haleakala	Pan-STARRS 1	PHO	690 m	MPC · JPL
843598	2016 HX_{27}	—	April 28, 2010	WISE	WISE	·	3.4 km	MPC · JPL
843599	2016 HT_{28}	—	April 16, 2016	Haleakala	Pan-STARRS 1	·	750 m	MPC · JPL
843600	2016 HO_{29}	—	April 30, 2016	Haleakala	Pan-STARRS 1	·	910 m	MPC · JPL

== 843601–843700 ==
back to top

Designation			Discovery			Properties		Ref
Permanent	Provisional	Named after	Date	Site	Discoverer(s)	Category	Diam.	Ref
843601	2016 HX_{29}	—	April 28, 2016	Mount Lemmon	Mount Lemmon Survey	·	560 m	MPC · JPL
843602	2016 HV_{33}	—	April 16, 2016	Haleakala	Pan-STARRS 1	·	820 m	MPC · JPL
843603	2016 HT_{34}	—	April 17, 2016	Mount Lemmon	Mount Lemmon Survey	(1547)	920 m	MPC · JPL
843604	2016 HE_{46}	—	September 10, 2010	Mount Lemmon	Mount Lemmon Survey	·	720 m	MPC · JPL
843605	2016 HU_{48}	—	April 30, 2016	Haleakala	Pan-STARRS 1	L4	5.9 km	MPC · JPL
843606	2016 JQ_{6}	—	April 15, 2016	Haleakala	Pan-STARRS 1	·	470 m	MPC · JPL
843607	2016 JG_{10}	—	April 16, 2016	Haleakala	Pan-STARRS 1	(1547)	1.2 km	MPC · JPL
843608	2016 JK_{15}	—	March 17, 2016	Haleakala	Pan-STARRS 1	·	940 m	MPC · JPL
843609	2016 JR_{16}	—	May 15, 2010	WISE	WISE	·	3.4 km	MPC · JPL
843610	2016 JQ_{20}	—	February 17, 2015	Haleakala	Pan-STARRS 1	EOS	1.6 km	MPC · JPL
843611	2016 JZ_{24}	—	February 17, 2010	Catalina	CSS	·	2.7 km	MPC · JPL
843612	2016 JE_{28}	—	January 12, 2010	Catalina	CSS	·	2.9 km	MPC · JPL
843613	2016 JK_{28}	—	November 2, 2007	Kitt Peak	Spacewatch	·	550 m	MPC · JPL
843614	2016 JM_{28}	—	May 10, 2016	Kitt Peak	Spacewatch	·	1.0 km	MPC · JPL
843615	2016 JX_{33}	—	March 5, 2013	Haleakala	Pan-STARRS 1	H	400 m	MPC · JPL
843616	2016 JP_{34}	—	May 7, 2010	WISE	WISE	·	2.8 km	MPC · JPL
843617	2016 JS_{37}	—	June 26, 2010	WISE	WISE	·	2.1 km	MPC · JPL
843618	2016 JL_{39}	—	May 3, 2016	Haleakala	Pan-STARRS 1	·	990 m	MPC · JPL
843619	2016 JM_{40}	—	July 20, 1993	La Silla	E. W. Elst	DOR	2.7 km	MPC · JPL
843620	2016 JF_{41}	—	January 23, 2011	Mount Lemmon	Mount Lemmon Survey	·	860 m	MPC · JPL
843621	2016 JN_{41}	—	May 4, 2016	Kitt Peak	Spacewatch	EUN	730 m	MPC · JPL
843622	2016 JG_{42}	—	April 29, 2016	Kitt Peak	Spacewatch	·	1.3 km	MPC · JPL
843623	2016 JN_{42}	—	May 2, 2016	Haleakala	Pan-STARRS 1	ADE	1.3 km	MPC · JPL
843624	2016 JT_{42}	—	May 2, 2016	Mount Lemmon	Mount Lemmon Survey	·	1.2 km	MPC · JPL
843625	2016 JA_{45}	—	May 2, 2016	Haleakala	Pan-STARRS 1	·	860 m	MPC · JPL
843626	2016 JN_{48}	—	May 6, 2016	Haleakala	Pan-STARRS 1	HNS	780 m	MPC · JPL
843627	2016 JQ_{53}	—	May 6, 2016	Haleakala	Pan-STARRS 1	JUN	600 m	MPC · JPL
843628	2016 JJ_{54}	—	April 4, 2016	Mount Lemmon	Mount Lemmon Survey	JUN	550 m	MPC · JPL
843629	2016 JY_{55}	—	May 2, 2016	Mount Lemmon	Mount Lemmon Survey	NYS	520 m	MPC · JPL
843630	2016 JG_{56}	—	May 15, 2016	Haleakala	Pan-STARRS 1	·	1.1 km	MPC · JPL
843631	2016 JU_{70}	—	May 3, 2016	Haleakala	Pan-STARRS 1	EOS	1.2 km	MPC · JPL
843632	2016 JQ_{72}	—	May 1, 2016	Cerro Tololo	DECam	·	1.1 km	MPC · JPL
843633	2016 JC_{74}	—	May 3, 2016	Cerro Tololo	DECam	MAR	760 m	MPC · JPL
843634	2016 KJ_{2}	—	March 18, 2010	Catalina	CSS	T_{j} (2.99)	3.0 km	MPC · JPL
843635	2016 KH_{3}	—	July 13, 2010	WISE	WISE	·	2.7 km	MPC · JPL
843636	2016 KP_{4}	—	November 25, 2009	Mount Lemmon	Mount Lemmon Survey	H	310 m	MPC · JPL
843637	2016 KR_{5}	—	October 4, 2013	Mount Lemmon	Mount Lemmon Survey	PHO	620 m	MPC · JPL
843638	2016 KW_{7}	—	May 24, 2010	WISE	WISE	·	2.3 km	MPC · JPL
843639	2016 KY_{7}	—	October 24, 2009	Mount Lemmon	Mount Lemmon Survey	L4	9.6 km	MPC · JPL
843640	2016 KB_{9}	—	May 4, 2000	Sacramento Peak	SDSS	·	1.7 km	MPC · JPL
843641	2016 KU_{10}	—	May 30, 2016	Haleakala	Pan-STARRS 1	·	970 m	MPC · JPL
843642	2016 KB_{11}	—	May 30, 2016	Haleakala	Pan-STARRS 1	·	1.2 km	MPC · JPL
843643	2016 KJ_{11}	—	May 30, 2016	Haleakala	Pan-STARRS 1	·	470 m	MPC · JPL
843644	2016 KS_{11}	—	May 17, 2016	Haleakala	Pan-STARRS 1	·	1.1 km	MPC · JPL
843645	2016 KP_{13}	—	May 30, 2016	Haleakala	Pan-STARRS 1	·	940 m	MPC · JPL
843646	2016 KN_{14}	—	May 30, 2016	Haleakala	Pan-STARRS 1	·	1.1 km	MPC · JPL
843647	2016 LF_{4}	—	June 2, 2006	Kitt Peak	Spacewatch	·	580 m	MPC · JPL
843648	2016 LT_{5}	—	February 10, 2016	Haleakala	Pan-STARRS 1	·	1.1 km	MPC · JPL
843649	2016 LK_{7}	—	March 20, 2010	Mount Lemmon	Mount Lemmon Survey	·	1.6 km	MPC · JPL
843650	2016 LS_{7}	—	June 4, 2016	Mount Lemmon	Mount Lemmon Survey	·	990 m	MPC · JPL
843651	2016 LE_{9}	—	June 5, 2016	Mount Lemmon	Mount Lemmon Survey	APO +1km	680 m	MPC · JPL
843652	2016 LA_{11}	—	June 7, 2016	Haleakala	Pan-STARRS 1	H	320 m	MPC · JPL
843653	2016 LP_{12}	—	February 13, 2007	Mount Lemmon	Mount Lemmon Survey	·	1.0 km	MPC · JPL
843654	2016 LS_{17}	—	January 11, 1997	Mauna Kea	Veillet, C.	ADE	1.9 km	MPC · JPL
843655	2016 LN_{20}	—	February 18, 2015	Haleakala	Pan-STARRS 1	·	2.3 km	MPC · JPL
843656	2016 LD_{26}	—	May 30, 2016	Haleakala	Pan-STARRS 1	3:2	3.9 km	MPC · JPL
843657	2016 LG_{36}	—	June 5, 2016	Haleakala	Pan-STARRS 1	3:2	4.1 km	MPC · JPL
843658	2016 LB_{47}	—	May 1, 2016	Haleakala	Pan-STARRS 1	EUN	800 m	MPC · JPL
843659	2016 LW_{53}	—	May 13, 2010	Mount Lemmon	Mount Lemmon Survey	THB	2.1 km	MPC · JPL
843660	2016 LK_{54}	—	April 9, 2010	WISE	WISE	·	3.1 km	MPC · JPL
843661	2016 LV_{54}	—	September 26, 2003	Sacramento Peak	SDSS	·	1.3 km	MPC · JPL
843662	2016 LA_{55}	—	September 20, 2008	Mount Lemmon	Mount Lemmon Survey	·	1.3 km	MPC · JPL
843663	2016 LL_{55}	—	June 8, 2016	Haleakala	Pan-STARRS 1	·	2.6 km	MPC · JPL
843664	2016 LV_{68}	—	June 4, 2016	Mount Lemmon	Mount Lemmon Survey	EUN	850 m	MPC · JPL
843665	2016 LM_{69}	—	April 3, 2010	WISE	WISE	EUP	4.0 km	MPC · JPL
843666	2016 LP_{69}	—	June 12, 2016	Mount Lemmon	Mount Lemmon Survey	·	2.0 km	MPC · JPL
843667	2016 LM_{73}	—	October 24, 2003	Sacramento Peak	SDSS	·	1.1 km	MPC · JPL
843668	2016 LA_{74}	—	June 8, 2016	Mount Lemmon	Mount Lemmon Survey	·	1.1 km	MPC · JPL
843669	2016 LK_{74}	—	September 4, 2012	Haleakala	Pan-STARRS 1	·	860 m	MPC · JPL
843670	2016 LX_{75}	—	June 11, 2016	Mount Lemmon	Mount Lemmon Survey	MAR	690 m	MPC · JPL
843671	2016 LC_{77}	—	June 8, 2016	Mount Lemmon	Mount Lemmon Survey	·	850 m	MPC · JPL
843672	2016 LD_{77}	—	June 8, 2016	Haleakala	Pan-STARRS 1	·	760 m	MPC · JPL
843673	2016 LG_{77}	—	June 7, 2016	Haleakala	Pan-STARRS 1	·	3.0 km	MPC · JPL
843674	2016 LH_{77}	—	June 8, 2016	Haleakala	Pan-STARRS 1	EUN	780 m	MPC · JPL
843675	2016 LJ_{81}	—	June 8, 2016	Haleakala	Pan-STARRS 1	·	830 m	MPC · JPL
843676	2016 LU_{82}	—	June 8, 2016	Mount Lemmon	Mount Lemmon Survey	BAP	550 m	MPC · JPL
843677	2016 LT_{84}	—	June 7, 2016	Haleakala	Pan-STARRS 1	·	1.2 km	MPC · JPL
843678	2016 LA_{95}	—	June 5, 2016	Haleakala	Pan-STARRS 1	·	920 m	MPC · JPL
843679	2016 LY_{97}	—	June 2, 2016	Mount Lemmon	Mount Lemmon Survey	·	2.4 km	MPC · JPL
843680	2016 ME_{4}	—	October 6, 2012	Haleakala	Pan-STARRS 1	EUN	880 m	MPC · JPL
843681	2016 MZ_{5}	—	June 28, 2016	Haleakala	Pan-STARRS 1	HNS	960 m	MPC · JPL
843682	2016 MM_{6}	—	June 29, 2016	Haleakala	Pan-STARRS 1	·	1.1 km	MPC · JPL
843683	2016 MW_{7}	—	June 29, 2016	Haleakala	Pan-STARRS 1	·	960 m	MPC · JPL
843684	2016 NF_{2}	—	May 26, 2015	Haleakala	Pan-STARRS 1	·	3.5 km	MPC · JPL
843685	2016 NK_{4}	—	June 14, 2016	Mount Lemmon	Mount Lemmon Survey	·	1.3 km	MPC · JPL
843686	2016 NB_{7}	—	April 3, 2010	WISE	WISE	EUP	3.8 km	MPC · JPL
843687	2016 NW_{7}	—	January 9, 2007	Mount Lemmon	Mount Lemmon Survey	H	500 m	MPC · JPL
843688	2016 NK_{11}	—	June 8, 2016	Haleakala	Pan-STARRS 1	·	1.5 km	MPC · JPL
843689	2016 NO_{17}	—	March 26, 2010	WISE	WISE	T_{j} (2.98)	3.0 km	MPC · JPL
843690	2016 NK_{21}	—	July 6, 2016	Haleakala	Pan-STARRS 1	·	1.8 km	MPC · JPL
843691	2016 NF_{22}	—	July 6, 2016	Mount Lemmon	Mount Lemmon Survey	APO	310 m	MPC · JPL
843692	2016 NW_{24}	—	March 28, 2010	WISE	WISE	·	2.7 km	MPC · JPL
843693	2016 NK_{26}	—	February 16, 2015	Haleakala	Pan-STARRS 1	·	1.0 km	MPC · JPL
843694	2016 NZ_{27}	—	June 5, 2016	Haleakala	Pan-STARRS 1	·	1.1 km	MPC · JPL
843695	2016 NY_{28}	—	August 30, 2005	Kitt Peak	Spacewatch	THB	1.8 km	MPC · JPL
843696	2016 NN_{30}	—	April 22, 2010	WISE	WISE	URS	3.0 km	MPC · JPL
843697	2016 NC_{31}	—	October 1, 2013	Mount Lemmon	Mount Lemmon Survey	·	510 m	MPC · JPL
843698	2016 NR_{35}	—	March 17, 2010	WISE	WISE	·	2.9 km	MPC · JPL
843699	2016 NC_{40}	—	June 7, 2016	Haleakala	Pan-STARRS 1	·	1.1 km	MPC · JPL
843700	2016 NC_{42}	—	September 26, 2012	Nogales	M. Schwartz, P. R. Holvorcem	·	1.4 km	MPC · JPL

== 843701–843800 ==
back to top

Designation			Discovery			Properties		Ref
Permanent	Provisional	Named after	Date	Site	Discoverer(s)	Category	Diam.	Ref
843701	2016 NE_{42}	—	October 1, 2005	Kitt Peak	Spacewatch	·	730 m	MPC · JPL
843702	2016 NW_{42}	—	March 24, 2015	Haleakala	Pan-STARRS 1	·	1.4 km	MPC · JPL
843703	2016 NE_{47}	—	May 26, 2011	Kitt Peak	Spacewatch	·	1.1 km	MPC · JPL
843704	2016 NQ_{50}	—	July 13, 2016	Mount Lemmon	Mount Lemmon Survey	DOR	1.4 km	MPC · JPL
843705	2016 NC_{57}	—	July 9, 2016	Mount Lemmon	Mount Lemmon Survey	H	570 m	MPC · JPL
843706	2016 NA_{59}	—	July 4, 2016	Haleakala	Pan-STARRS 1	MRX	680 m	MPC · JPL
843707	2016 NC_{59}	—	July 4, 2016	Haleakala	Pan-STARRS 1	·	1.1 km	MPC · JPL
843708	2016 NK_{59}	—	July 4, 2016	Haleakala	Pan-STARRS 1	·	1 km	MPC · JPL
843709	2016 NN_{59}	—	July 4, 2016	Haleakala	Pan-STARRS 1	·	1.3 km	MPC · JPL
843710	2016 NQ_{59}	—	January 14, 2010	WISE	WISE	·	3.3 km	MPC · JPL
843711	2016 NR_{59}	—	July 5, 2016	Haleakala	Pan-STARRS 1	·	1.3 km	MPC · JPL
843712	2016 NH_{61}	—	July 7, 2016	Haleakala	Pan-STARRS 1	·	1.3 km	MPC · JPL
843713	2016 NM_{61}	—	July 7, 2016	Haleakala	Pan-STARRS 1	·	1.3 km	MPC · JPL
843714	2016 NZ_{61}	—	July 11, 2016	Haleakala	Pan-STARRS 1	·	1.3 km	MPC · JPL
843715	2016 NB_{62}	—	July 11, 2016	Haleakala	Pan-STARRS 1	·	1.5 km	MPC · JPL
843716	2016 NK_{64}	—	May 22, 2010	WISE	WISE	·	3.7 km	MPC · JPL
843717	2016 NX_{69}	—	April 17, 2010	WISE	WISE	·	2.5 km	MPC · JPL
843718	2016 NZ_{70}	—	September 24, 2012	Kitt Peak	Spacewatch	·	1.3 km	MPC · JPL
843719	2016 NB_{71}	—	July 4, 2016	Haleakala	Pan-STARRS 1	EUN	820 m	MPC · JPL
843720	2016 NA_{79}	—	October 20, 2012	Haleakala	Pan-STARRS 1	·	1.2 km	MPC · JPL
843721	2016 NM_{82}	—	October 26, 2012	Mount Lemmon	Mount Lemmon Survey	·	1.6 km	MPC · JPL
843722	2016 ND_{85}	—	November 6, 2012	Mount Lemmon	Mount Lemmon Survey	AGN	970 m	MPC · JPL
843723	2016 NM_{85}	—	July 27, 2005	Palomar	NEAT	·	2.0 km	MPC · JPL
843724	2016 NZ_{86}	—	July 12, 2016	Haleakala	Pan-STARRS 1	·	1.1 km	MPC · JPL
843725	2016 NG_{87}	—	October 8, 2012	Haleakala	Pan-STARRS 1	AEO	770 m	MPC · JPL
843726	2016 NU_{89}	—	July 14, 2016	Mount Lemmon	Mount Lemmon Survey	·	1.7 km	MPC · JPL
843727	2016 NW_{89}	—	June 25, 2011	Kitt Peak	Spacewatch	·	1.5 km	MPC · JPL
843728	2016 NT_{92}	—	July 9, 2016	Haleakala	Pan-STARRS 1	·	1.8 km	MPC · JPL
843729	2016 NQ_{93}	—	July 13, 2016	Mount Lemmon	Mount Lemmon Survey	PHO	640 m	MPC · JPL
843730	2016 NA_{94}	—	July 5, 2016	Haleakala	Pan-STARRS 1	·	1.2 km	MPC · JPL
843731	2016 NG_{94}	—	July 13, 2016	Mount Lemmon	Mount Lemmon Survey	·	2.0 km	MPC · JPL
843732	2016 NV_{96}	—	July 7, 2016	Haleakala	Pan-STARRS 1	·	960 m	MPC · JPL
843733	2016 NZ_{96}	—	July 5, 2016	Haleakala	Pan-STARRS 1	·	1 km	MPC · JPL
843734	2016 NQ_{98}	—	July 7, 2016	Haleakala	Pan-STARRS 1	·	650 m	MPC · JPL
843735	2016 NB_{99}	—	July 9, 2016	Haleakala	Pan-STARRS 1	·	660 m	MPC · JPL
843736	2016 NL_{103}	—	July 4, 2016	Haleakala	Pan-STARRS 1	·	550 m	MPC · JPL
843737	2016 NA_{105}	—	June 16, 2010	WISE	WISE	·	1.2 km	MPC · JPL
843738	2016 NT_{108}	—	October 11, 2012	Kitt Peak	Spacewatch	·	1.3 km	MPC · JPL
843739	2016 ND_{109}	—	July 11, 2016	Mount Lemmon	Mount Lemmon Survey	HNS	1.0 km	MPC · JPL
843740	2016 NB_{110}	—	July 14, 2016	Haleakala	Pan-STARRS 1	·	1.2 km	MPC · JPL
843741	2016 NJ_{110}	—	July 4, 2016	Haleakala	Pan-STARRS 1	·	1.3 km	MPC · JPL
843742	2016 NR_{111}	—	July 7, 2016	Haleakala	Pan-STARRS 1	·	1.0 km	MPC · JPL
843743	2016 NP_{113}	—	July 14, 2016	Haleakala	Pan-STARRS 1	·	1.3 km	MPC · JPL
843744	2016 NR_{114}	—	July 3, 2016	Mount Lemmon	Mount Lemmon Survey	EUN	920 m	MPC · JPL
843745	2016 NJ_{115}	—	July 9, 2016	Mount Lemmon	Mount Lemmon Survey	EUN	880 m	MPC · JPL
843746	2016 NR_{116}	—	July 12, 2016	Mount Lemmon	Mount Lemmon Survey	·	890 m	MPC · JPL
843747	2016 NX_{116}	—	October 11, 2007	Mount Lemmon	Mount Lemmon Survey	·	1.3 km	MPC · JPL
843748	2016 NG_{117}	—	July 7, 2016	Haleakala	Pan-STARRS 1	·	1.2 km	MPC · JPL
843749	2016 NY_{119}	—	July 7, 2016	Mount Lemmon	Mount Lemmon Survey	·	1.3 km	MPC · JPL
843750	2016 NN_{121}	—	July 5, 2016	Mount Lemmon	Mount Lemmon Survey	·	1.5 km	MPC · JPL
843751	2016 NZ_{123}	—	July 12, 2016	Mount Lemmon	Mount Lemmon Survey	·	730 m	MPC · JPL
843752	2016 NL_{124}	—	July 14, 2016	Haleakala	Pan-STARRS 1	MAS	450 m	MPC · JPL
843753	2016 NT_{124}	—	July 15, 2016	Mount Lemmon	Mount Lemmon Survey	·	530 m	MPC · JPL
843754	2016 NO_{127}	—	July 7, 2016	Mount Lemmon	Mount Lemmon Survey	·	1.3 km	MPC · JPL
843755	2016 NU_{132}	—	July 14, 2016	Haleakala	Pan-STARRS 1	V	470 m	MPC · JPL
843756	2016 NM_{133}	—	July 11, 2016	Haleakala	Pan-STARRS 1	·	1.3 km	MPC · JPL
843757	2016 NO_{133}	—	July 6, 2016	Mount Lemmon	Mount Lemmon Survey	·	980 m	MPC · JPL
843758	2016 NY_{135}	—	July 4, 2016	Haleakala	Pan-STARRS 1	·	1.1 km	MPC · JPL
843759	2016 ND_{136}	—	July 6, 2016	Haleakala	Pan-STARRS 1	HNS	1.3 km	MPC · JPL
843760	2016 NO_{136}	—	July 12, 2016	Mount Lemmon	Mount Lemmon Survey	THM	1.8 km	MPC · JPL
843761	2016 NV_{136}	—	July 11, 2016	Haleakala	Pan-STARRS 1	·	1.3 km	MPC · JPL
843762	2016 NC_{142}	—	July 11, 2016	Haleakala	Pan-STARRS 1	·	2.0 km	MPC · JPL
843763	2016 NV_{143}	—	July 4, 2016	Haleakala	Pan-STARRS 1	·	1.3 km	MPC · JPL
843764	2016 NB_{144}	—	July 3, 2016	Mount Lemmon	Mount Lemmon Survey	EUN	840 m	MPC · JPL
843765	2016 ND_{144}	—	July 4, 2016	Haleakala	Pan-STARRS 1	·	1.3 km	MPC · JPL
843766	2016 NJ_{144}	—	July 9, 2016	Haleakala	Pan-STARRS 1	·	1.5 km	MPC · JPL
843767	2016 NQ_{144}	—	July 11, 2016	Haleakala	Pan-STARRS 1	·	1.5 km	MPC · JPL
843768	2016 NS_{144}	—	July 5, 2016	Haleakala	Pan-STARRS 1	·	1.4 km	MPC · JPL
843769	2016 NJ_{145}	—	July 14, 2016	Haleakala	Pan-STARRS 1	·	1.2 km	MPC · JPL
843770	2016 NP_{148}	—	July 14, 2016	Haleakala	Pan-STARRS 1	·	1.3 km	MPC · JPL
843771	2016 NZ_{149}	—	July 5, 2016	Haleakala	Pan-STARRS 1	·	1.4 km	MPC · JPL
843772	2016 NR_{150}	—	July 13, 2016	Haleakala	Pan-STARRS 1	AGN	760 m	MPC · JPL
843773	2016 NZ_{152}	—	July 4, 2016	Haleakala	Pan-STARRS 1	DOR	1.7 km	MPC · JPL
843774	2016 NM_{153}	—	July 4, 2016	Kitt Peak	Spacewatch	·	1.3 km	MPC · JPL
843775	2016 NF_{154}	—	July 5, 2016	Mount Lemmon	Mount Lemmon Survey	·	1.2 km	MPC · JPL
843776	2016 NL_{155}	—	July 11, 2016	Haleakala	Pan-STARRS 1	HNS	900 m	MPC · JPL
843777	2016 NN_{155}	—	July 7, 2016	Haleakala	Pan-STARRS 1	·	1.3 km	MPC · JPL
843778	2016 NO_{155}	—	July 14, 2016	Haleakala	Pan-STARRS 1	·	990 m	MPC · JPL
843779	2016 NY_{155}	—	July 11, 2016	Haleakala	Pan-STARRS 1	·	1.4 km	MPC · JPL
843780	2016 NR_{156}	—	July 11, 2016	Haleakala	Pan-STARRS 1	·	1.2 km	MPC · JPL
843781	2016 NK_{157}	—	July 11, 2016	Haleakala	Pan-STARRS 1	·	1.3 km	MPC · JPL
843782	2016 NL_{157}	—	July 1, 2016	ESA OGS	ESA OGS	·	1.2 km	MPC · JPL
843783	2016 NZ_{157}	—	July 9, 2016	Haleakala	Pan-STARRS 1	·	1.1 km	MPC · JPL
843784	2016 NY_{158}	—	July 14, 2016	Haleakala	Pan-STARRS 1	·	820 m	MPC · JPL
843785	2016 NY_{159}	—	July 3, 2016	Mount Lemmon	Mount Lemmon Survey	·	1.2 km	MPC · JPL
843786	2016 NF_{160}	—	July 11, 2016	Haleakala	Pan-STARRS 1	·	950 m	MPC · JPL
843787	2016 NN_{166}	—	July 7, 2016	Haleakala	Pan-STARRS 1	EOS	1.2 km	MPC · JPL
843788	2016 NP_{170}	—	July 7, 2016	Haleakala	Pan-STARRS 1	·	2.4 km	MPC · JPL
843789	2016 NO_{174}	—	July 12, 2016	Haleakala	Pan-STARRS 1	·	1.3 km	MPC · JPL
843790	2016 NV_{190}	—	July 4, 2016	Haleakala	Pan-STARRS 1	·	1.2 km	MPC · JPL
843791	2016 NR_{196}	—	January 15, 2019	Haleakala	Pan-STARRS 1	·	1.3 km	MPC · JPL
843792	2016 NO_{207}	—	July 7, 2016	Haleakala	Pan-STARRS 1	·	1.4 km	MPC · JPL
843793	2016 OH_{4}	—	July 4, 2016	Haleakala	Pan-STARRS 1	·	890 m	MPC · JPL
843794	2016 OG_{6}	—	July 30, 2016	Haleakala	Pan-STARRS 1	·	1.5 km	MPC · JPL
843795	2016 OK_{9}	—	November 3, 2005	Catalina	CSS	LIX	2.6 km	MPC · JPL
843796	2016 OM_{9}	—	July 30, 2016	Haleakala	Pan-STARRS 1	·	1.1 km	MPC · JPL
843797	2016 OY_{10}	—	July 30, 2016	Haleakala	Pan-STARRS 1	·	1.1 km	MPC · JPL
843798	2016 OD_{13}	—	July 17, 2016	Haleakala	Pan-STARRS 1	·	1.2 km	MPC · JPL
843799	2016 OS_{13}	—	July 28, 2016	Haleakala	Pan-STARRS 1	·	1.6 km	MPC · JPL
843800	2016 OD_{14}	—	July 29, 2016	Haleakala	Pan-STARRS 1	·	1.3 km	MPC · JPL

== 843801–843900 ==
back to top

Designation			Discovery			Properties		Ref
Permanent	Provisional	Named after	Date	Site	Discoverer(s)	Category	Diam.	Ref
843801	2016 PL_{2}	—	November 2, 2011	Mount Lemmon	Mount Lemmon Survey	·	2.7 km	MPC · JPL
843802	2016 PW_{9}	—	January 23, 2015	Haleakala	Pan-STARRS 1	H	310 m	MPC · JPL
843803	2016 PG_{10}	—	January 14, 2011	Mount Lemmon	Mount Lemmon Survey	·	380 m	MPC · JPL
843804	2016 PN_{10}	—	October 18, 2012	Haleakala	Pan-STARRS 1	·	1.2 km	MPC · JPL
843805	2016 PS_{13}	—	September 16, 2012	Mount Lemmon	Mount Lemmon Survey	·	1.2 km	MPC · JPL
843806	2016 PN_{20}	—	December 1, 2008	Kitt Peak	Spacewatch	·	1.0 km	MPC · JPL
843807	2016 PM_{23}	—	August 7, 2016	Haleakala	Pan-STARRS 1	·	770 m	MPC · JPL
843808	2016 PM_{30}	—	October 14, 2001	Sacramento Peak	SDSS	·	1.5 km	MPC · JPL
843809	2016 PN_{31}	—	May 5, 2010	WISE	WISE	·	3.3 km	MPC · JPL
843810	2016 PK_{32}	—	March 16, 2015	Haleakala	Pan-STARRS 1	·	1.6 km	MPC · JPL
843811	2016 PR_{35}	—	February 4, 2009	Mount Lemmon	Mount Lemmon Survey	·	1.4 km	MPC · JPL
843812	2016 PK_{41}	—	October 15, 2012	Mount Lemmon	Mount Lemmon Survey	NEM	1.3 km	MPC · JPL
843813	2016 PS_{47}	—	October 19, 2012	Mount Lemmon	Mount Lemmon Survey	·	1.4 km	MPC · JPL
843814	2016 PE_{50}	—	July 8, 2016	Haleakala	Pan-STARRS 1	·	520 m	MPC · JPL
843815	2016 PP_{50}	—	February 1, 2010	WISE	WISE	·	2.1 km	MPC · JPL
843816	2016 PL_{52}	—	March 16, 2015	Mount Lemmon	Mount Lemmon Survey	·	1.2 km	MPC · JPL
843817	2016 PE_{53}	—	August 7, 2016	Haleakala	Pan-STARRS 1	VER	1.9 km	MPC · JPL
843818	2016 PQ_{55}	—	August 2, 2016	Haleakala	Pan-STARRS 1	·	510 m	MPC · JPL
843819	2016 PG_{64}	—	September 21, 2011	Kitt Peak	Spacewatch	·	1.1 km	MPC · JPL
843820	2016 PE_{66}	—	September 11, 2007	Kitt Peak	Spacewatch	·	1.3 km	MPC · JPL
843821	2016 PC_{69}	—	December 19, 2003	Kitt Peak	Spacewatch	·	1.5 km	MPC · JPL
843822	2016 PH_{72}	—	October 28, 1998	Kitt Peak	Spacewatch	·	1.4 km	MPC · JPL
843823	2016 PO_{74}	—	August 2, 2016	Haleakala	Pan-STARRS 1	·	1.6 km	MPC · JPL
843824	2016 PK_{75}	—	May 27, 2010	WISE	WISE	T_{j} (2.99)	3.2 km	MPC · JPL
843825	2016 PN_{78}	—	March 29, 2008	Kitt Peak	Spacewatch	PHO	760 m	MPC · JPL
843826	2016 PM_{82}	—	August 2, 2016	Haleakala	Pan-STARRS 1	·	1.3 km	MPC · JPL
843827	2016 PG_{84}	—	May 25, 2006	Mauna Kea	P. A. Wiegert	·	1.2 km	MPC · JPL
843828	2016 PS_{85}	—	August 3, 2016	Haleakala	Pan-STARRS 1	·	1.5 km	MPC · JPL
843829	2016 PR_{86}	—	April 23, 2010	WISE	WISE	·	2.2 km	MPC · JPL
843830	2016 PK_{87}	—	August 10, 2016	Haleakala	Pan-STARRS 1	WIT	710 m	MPC · JPL
843831	2016 PH_{88}	—	August 12, 2016	Haleakala	Pan-STARRS 1	·	1.1 km	MPC · JPL
843832	2016 PX_{92}	—	August 1, 2016	Haleakala	Pan-STARRS 1	·	1.5 km	MPC · JPL
843833	2016 PF_{93}	—	August 2, 2016	Haleakala	Pan-STARRS 1	·	1.5 km	MPC · JPL
843834	2016 PZ_{93}	—	September 13, 2007	Mount Lemmon	Mount Lemmon Survey	GEF	780 m	MPC · JPL
843835	2016 PH_{94}	—	August 10, 2016	Haleakala	Pan-STARRS 1	·	1.4 km	MPC · JPL
843836	2016 PC_{96}	—	November 11, 2001	Sacramento Peak	SDSS	EOS	1.4 km	MPC · JPL
843837	2016 PR_{96}	—	November 21, 2008	Mount Lemmon	Mount Lemmon Survey	·	1.1 km	MPC · JPL
843838	2016 PZ_{96}	—	August 2, 2016	Haleakala	Pan-STARRS 1	·	1.3 km	MPC · JPL
843839	2016 PE_{97}	—	February 28, 2014	Haleakala	Pan-STARRS 1	·	1.2 km	MPC · JPL
843840	2016 PC_{98}	—	August 9, 2016	Haleakala	Pan-STARRS 1	EUN	830 m	MPC · JPL
843841	2016 PP_{98}	—	October 29, 2008	Mount Lemmon	Mount Lemmon Survey	·	980 m	MPC · JPL
843842	2016 PS_{103}	—	February 11, 2014	Mount Lemmon	Mount Lemmon Survey	HNS	1.0 km	MPC · JPL
843843	2016 PW_{104}	—	July 3, 2011	Mount Lemmon	Mount Lemmon Survey	·	1.7 km	MPC · JPL
843844	2016 PD_{105}	—	August 1, 2016	Haleakala	Pan-STARRS 1	·	770 m	MPC · JPL
843845	2016 PW_{106}	—	August 2, 2016	Haleakala	Pan-STARRS 1	·	1.4 km	MPC · JPL
843846	2016 PW_{107}	—	November 6, 2012	Mount Lemmon	Mount Lemmon Survey	·	1.1 km	MPC · JPL
843847	2016 PX_{107}	—	February 28, 2014	Haleakala	Pan-STARRS 1	EOS	1.3 km	MPC · JPL
843848	2016 PH_{108}	—	October 16, 2012	Mount Lemmon	Mount Lemmon Survey	WIT	730 m	MPC · JPL
843849	2016 PY_{108}	—	September 18, 2012	Mount Lemmon	Mount Lemmon Survey	·	920 m	MPC · JPL
843850	2016 PJ_{109}	—	October 20, 2012	Kitt Peak	Spacewatch	AGN	780 m	MPC · JPL
843851	2016 PK_{109}	—	August 2, 2016	Haleakala	Pan-STARRS 1	·	1.1 km	MPC · JPL
843852	2016 PH_{110}	—	January 24, 2014	Haleakala	Pan-STARRS 1	HOF	2.1 km	MPC · JPL
843853	2016 PQ_{110}	—	February 20, 2009	Kitt Peak	Spacewatch	·	1.9 km	MPC · JPL
843854	2016 PQ_{111}	—	January 16, 2009	Mount Lemmon	Mount Lemmon Survey	·	1.4 km	MPC · JPL
843855	2016 PP_{112}	—	August 2, 2016	Haleakala	Pan-STARRS 1	·	1.7 km	MPC · JPL
843856	2016 PA_{117}	—	May 12, 2015	Mount Lemmon	Mount Lemmon Survey	·	1.5 km	MPC · JPL
843857	2016 PH_{118}	—	September 13, 2012	Mount Lemmon	Mount Lemmon Survey	HNS	1.0 km	MPC · JPL
843858	2016 PL_{118}	—	April 10, 2015	Mount Lemmon	Mount Lemmon Survey	·	920 m	MPC · JPL
843859	2016 PS_{119}	—	January 28, 2015	Haleakala	Pan-STARRS 1	PHO	650 m	MPC · JPL
843860	2016 PM_{120}	—	September 26, 2003	Sacramento Peak	SDSS	EUN	930 m	MPC · JPL
843861	2016 PR_{121}	—	August 9, 2016	Haleakala	Pan-STARRS 1	·	1.4 km	MPC · JPL
843862	2016 PJ_{122}	—	August 30, 2011	Kitt Peak	Spacewatch	·	1.3 km	MPC · JPL
843863	2016 PQ_{123}	—	August 10, 2016	Haleakala	Pan-STARRS 1	·	2.3 km	MPC · JPL
843864	2016 PD_{125}	—	October 11, 2012	Haleakala	Pan-STARRS 1	·	1.3 km	MPC · JPL
843865	2016 PG_{125}	—	October 8, 2012	Mount Lemmon	Mount Lemmon Survey	·	1.4 km	MPC · JPL
843866	2016 PW_{126}	—	September 20, 2003	Kitt Peak	Spacewatch	·	1.1 km	MPC · JPL
843867	2016 PZ_{126}	—	April 18, 2015	Haleakala	Pan-STARRS 1	GEF	970 m	MPC · JPL
843868	2016 PO_{127}	—	January 6, 2013	Mount Lemmon	Mount Lemmon Survey	(18466)	1.6 km	MPC · JPL
843869	2016 PR_{129}	—	June 19, 2010	WISE	WISE	·	3.6 km	MPC · JPL
843870	2016 PB_{130}	—	August 10, 2016	Haleakala	Pan-STARRS 1	·	3.4 km	MPC · JPL
843871	2016 PL_{131}	—	August 7, 2016	Haleakala	Pan-STARRS 1	·	1.3 km	MPC · JPL
843872	2016 PJ_{132}	—	December 15, 2006	Kitt Peak	Spacewatch	·	2.1 km	MPC · JPL
843873	2016 PT_{132}	—	August 8, 2016	Haleakala	Pan-STARRS 1	AEO	790 m	MPC · JPL
843874	2016 PW_{132}	—	May 4, 2010	WISE	WISE	·	3.1 km	MPC · JPL
843875	2016 PD_{134}	—	August 14, 2016	Haleakala	Pan-STARRS 1	·	1.2 km	MPC · JPL
843876	2016 PJ_{134}	—	August 2, 2016	Haleakala	Pan-STARRS 1	·	790 m	MPC · JPL
843877	2016 PA_{139}	—	August 3, 2016	Haleakala	Pan-STARRS 1	·	1.2 km	MPC · JPL
843878	2016 PP_{139}	—	August 1, 2016	Haleakala	Pan-STARRS 1	·	1.6 km	MPC · JPL
843879	2016 PP_{142}	—	August 2, 2016	Haleakala	Pan-STARRS 1	·	1.7 km	MPC · JPL
843880	2016 PJ_{144}	—	November 13, 2012	Mount Lemmon	Mount Lemmon Survey	·	1.0 km	MPC · JPL
843881	2016 PO_{147}	—	July 12, 2010	WISE	WISE	·	1.8 km	MPC · JPL
843882	2016 PF_{149}	—	May 3, 2010	WISE	WISE	·	2.8 km	MPC · JPL
843883	2016 PY_{150}	—	August 7, 2016	Haleakala	Pan-STARRS 1	PHO	610 m	MPC · JPL
843884	2016 PB_{151}	—	August 1, 2016	Haleakala	Pan-STARRS 1	·	1.2 km	MPC · JPL
843885	2016 PD_{152}	—	August 8, 2016	Haleakala	Pan-STARRS 1	·	1.1 km	MPC · JPL
843886	2016 PH_{154}	—	August 3, 2016	Haleakala	Pan-STARRS 1	·	1.3 km	MPC · JPL
843887	2016 PQ_{155}	—	August 3, 2016	Haleakala	Pan-STARRS 1	·	980 m	MPC · JPL
843888	2016 PX_{155}	—	August 13, 2016	Haleakala	Pan-STARRS 1	·	1.6 km	MPC · JPL
843889	2016 PE_{156}	—	August 15, 2016	Haleakala	Pan-STARRS 1	·	1.5 km	MPC · JPL
843890	2016 PO_{156}	—	August 10, 2016	Haleakala	Pan-STARRS 1	V	510 m	MPC · JPL
843891	2016 PA_{157}	—	August 2, 2016	Haleakala	Pan-STARRS 1	·	1.3 km	MPC · JPL
843892	2016 PB_{158}	—	August 12, 2016	Haleakala	Pan-STARRS 1	·	1.3 km	MPC · JPL
843893	2016 PJ_{158}	—	August 2, 2016	Haleakala	Pan-STARRS 1	AEO	830 m	MPC · JPL
843894	2016 PA_{159}	—	August 3, 2016	Haleakala	Pan-STARRS 1	MRX	730 m	MPC · JPL
843895	2016 PN_{160}	—	August 8, 2016	Haleakala	Pan-STARRS 1	MRX	630 m	MPC · JPL
843896	2016 PD_{161}	—	August 3, 2016	Haleakala	Pan-STARRS 1	·	1.1 km	MPC · JPL
843897	2016 PQ_{163}	—	August 2, 2016	Haleakala	Pan-STARRS 1	·	1.3 km	MPC · JPL
843898	2016 PA_{164}	—	October 8, 2012	Haleakala	Pan-STARRS 1	·	860 m	MPC · JPL
843899	2016 PP_{167}	—	August 11, 2016	Haleakala	Pan-STARRS 1	PHO	690 m	MPC · JPL
843900	2016 PR_{167}	—	August 14, 2016	Haleakala	Pan-STARRS 1	·	820 m	MPC · JPL

== 843901–844000 ==
back to top

Designation			Discovery			Properties		Ref
Permanent	Provisional	Named after	Date	Site	Discoverer(s)	Category	Diam.	Ref
843901	2016 PR_{168}	—	August 2, 2016	Haleakala	Pan-STARRS 1	KOR	950 m	MPC · JPL
843902	2016 PS_{172}	—	August 7, 2016	Haleakala	Pan-STARRS 1	·	1.3 km	MPC · JPL
843903	2016 PN_{182}	—	August 1, 2016	Haleakala	Pan-STARRS 1	·	510 m	MPC · JPL
843904	2016 PT_{183}	—	August 2, 2016	Haleakala	Pan-STARRS 1	·	590 m	MPC · JPL
843905	2016 PU_{183}	—	August 2, 2016	Haleakala	Pan-STARRS 1	·	1.0 km	MPC · JPL
843906	2016 PW_{184}	—	August 1, 2016	Haleakala	Pan-STARRS 1	·	2.2 km	MPC · JPL
843907	2016 PA_{186}	—	August 2, 2016	Haleakala	Pan-STARRS 1	·	870 m	MPC · JPL
843908	2016 PG_{186}	—	August 2, 2016	Haleakala	Pan-STARRS 1	·	760 m	MPC · JPL
843909	2016 PE_{187}	—	August 7, 2016	Haleakala	Pan-STARRS 1	·	640 m	MPC · JPL
843910	2016 PB_{188}	—	August 2, 2016	Haleakala	Pan-STARRS 1	·	760 m	MPC · JPL
843911	2016 PC_{191}	—	August 2, 2016	Haleakala	Pan-STARRS 1	HNS	810 m	MPC · JPL
843912	2016 PK_{191}	—	August 12, 2016	Haleakala	Pan-STARRS 1	·	610 m	MPC · JPL
843913	2016 PX_{191}	—	August 14, 2016	Haleakala	Pan-STARRS 1	·	1.2 km	MPC · JPL
843914	2016 PP_{194}	—	August 2, 2016	Haleakala	Pan-STARRS 1	·	1.2 km	MPC · JPL
843915	2016 PG_{202}	—	August 3, 2016	Haleakala	Pan-STARRS 1	·	440 m	MPC · JPL
843916	2016 PU_{203}	—	August 3, 2016	Haleakala	Pan-STARRS 1	·	2.1 km	MPC · JPL
843917	2016 PP_{204}	—	August 3, 2016	Haleakala	Pan-STARRS 1	AEO	640 m	MPC · JPL
843918	2016 PC_{205}	—	August 14, 2016	Haleakala	Pan-STARRS 1	·	530 m	MPC · JPL
843919	2016 PK_{205}	—	August 14, 2016	Haleakala	Pan-STARRS 1	·	1.6 km	MPC · JPL
843920	2016 PW_{206}	—	August 8, 2016	Haleakala	Pan-STARRS 1	(1338) (FLO)	450 m	MPC · JPL
843921	2016 PY_{208}	—	August 7, 2016	Haleakala	Pan-STARRS 1	·	1.3 km	MPC · JPL
843922	2016 PD_{209}	—	August 1, 2016	Haleakala	Pan-STARRS 1	·	1.6 km	MPC · JPL
843923	2016 PG_{209}	—	August 3, 2016	Haleakala	Pan-STARRS 1	·	1.2 km	MPC · JPL
843924	2016 PJ_{209}	—	August 2, 2016	Haleakala	Pan-STARRS 1	·	1.3 km	MPC · JPL
843925	2016 PL_{209}	—	August 1, 2016	Haleakala	Pan-STARRS 1	EUN	730 m	MPC · JPL
843926	2016 PM_{222}	—	August 7, 2016	Haleakala	Pan-STARRS 1	·	1.5 km	MPC · JPL
843927	2016 PA_{223}	—	August 1, 2016	Haleakala	Pan-STARRS 1	·	1.1 km	MPC · JPL
843928	2016 PV_{223}	—	August 9, 2016	Haleakala	Pan-STARRS 1	GEF	810 m	MPC · JPL
843929	2016 PD_{224}	—	August 6, 2016	Haleakala	Pan-STARRS 1	·	1.6 km	MPC · JPL
843930	2016 PH_{224}	—	August 3, 2016	Haleakala	Pan-STARRS 1	HOF	2.0 km	MPC · JPL
843931	2016 PV_{224}	—	August 14, 2016	Haleakala	Pan-STARRS 1	·	1.5 km	MPC · JPL
843932	2016 PY_{224}	—	August 13, 2016	Haleakala	Pan-STARRS 1	·	1.3 km	MPC · JPL
843933	2016 PL_{225}	—	August 2, 2016	Haleakala	Pan-STARRS 1	·	1.3 km	MPC · JPL
843934	2016 PZ_{225}	—	August 1, 2016	Haleakala	Pan-STARRS 1	AGN	760 m	MPC · JPL
843935	2016 PC_{226}	—	August 8, 2016	Haleakala	Pan-STARRS 1	·	1.3 km	MPC · JPL
843936	2016 PE_{227}	—	August 8, 2016	Haleakala	Pan-STARRS 1	·	1.3 km	MPC · JPL
843937	2016 PM_{227}	—	August 3, 2016	Haleakala	Pan-STARRS 1	·	1.3 km	MPC · JPL
843938	2016 PO_{227}	—	September 19, 1998	Sacramento Peak	SDSS	·	1.2 km	MPC · JPL
843939	2016 PS_{227}	—	August 7, 2016	Haleakala	Pan-STARRS 1	GEF	670 m	MPC · JPL
843940	2016 PX_{227}	—	August 7, 2016	Haleakala	Pan-STARRS 1	·	1.2 km	MPC · JPL
843941	2016 PW_{228}	—	August 14, 2016	Haleakala	Pan-STARRS 1	·	1.4 km	MPC · JPL
843942	2016 PY_{228}	—	August 7, 2016	Haleakala	Pan-STARRS 1	·	1.3 km	MPC · JPL
843943	2016 PH_{229}	—	August 7, 2016	Haleakala	Pan-STARRS 1	·	1.3 km	MPC · JPL
843944	2016 PO_{229}	—	August 3, 2016	Haleakala	Pan-STARRS 1	·	1.4 km	MPC · JPL
843945	2016 PU_{229}	—	August 8, 2016	Haleakala	Pan-STARRS 1	·	1.1 km	MPC · JPL
843946	2016 PB_{230}	—	August 3, 2016	Haleakala	Pan-STARRS 1	HNS	840 m	MPC · JPL
843947	2016 PD_{230}	—	August 2, 2016	Haleakala	Pan-STARRS 1	DOR	1.5 km	MPC · JPL
843948	2016 PR_{231}	—	August 2, 2016	Haleakala	Pan-STARRS 1	·	1.3 km	MPC · JPL
843949	2016 PZ_{231}	—	August 3, 2016	Haleakala	Pan-STARRS 1	·	1.0 km	MPC · JPL
843950	2016 PB_{233}	—	August 7, 2016	Haleakala	Pan-STARRS 1	·	1.4 km	MPC · JPL
843951	2016 PG_{233}	—	August 2, 2016	Haleakala	Pan-STARRS 1	·	790 m	MPC · JPL
843952	2016 PU_{233}	—	August 10, 2016	Haleakala	Pan-STARRS 1	·	1.4 km	MPC · JPL
843953	2016 PL_{234}	—	August 3, 2016	Haleakala	Pan-STARRS 1	·	1.1 km	MPC · JPL
843954	2016 PH_{235}	—	August 2, 2016	Haleakala	Pan-STARRS 1	GEF	770 m	MPC · JPL
843955	2016 PY_{238}	—	August 14, 2016	Haleakala	Pan-STARRS 1	AGN	770 m	MPC · JPL
843956	2016 PK_{240}	—	August 9, 2016	Haleakala	Pan-STARRS 1	EOS	1.0 km	MPC · JPL
843957	2016 PZ_{242}	—	July 14, 2016	Haleakala	Pan-STARRS 1	·	1.3 km	MPC · JPL
843958	2016 PM_{243}	—	August 2, 2016	Haleakala	Pan-STARRS 1	·	1.3 km	MPC · JPL
843959	2016 PG_{252}	—	August 3, 2016	Haleakala	Pan-STARRS 1	·	1.2 km	MPC · JPL
843960	2016 PS_{273}	—	August 8, 2016	Haleakala	Pan-STARRS 1	·	950 m	MPC · JPL
843961	2016 PL_{275}	—	August 2, 2016	Haleakala	Pan-STARRS 1	·	930 m	MPC · JPL
843962	2016 PZ_{297}	—	April 24, 2014	Cerro Tololo	DECam	·	2.2 km	MPC · JPL
843963	2016 QJ_{4}	—	May 22, 2015	Haleakala	Pan-STARRS 1	LIX	2.7 km	MPC · JPL
843964	2016 QJ_{5}	—	July 11, 2016	Haleakala	Pan-STARRS 1	KRM	1.8 km	MPC · JPL
843965	2016 QK_{8}	—	September 10, 2007	Mount Lemmon	Mount Lemmon Survey	·	1.1 km	MPC · JPL
843966	2016 QV_{8}	—	March 20, 2010	WISE	WISE	PHO	2.1 km	MPC · JPL
843967	2016 QX_{11}	—	September 11, 2007	Kitt Peak	Spacewatch	·	1.2 km	MPC · JPL
843968	2016 QR_{14}	—	March 30, 2010	WISE	WISE	·	3.8 km	MPC · JPL
843969	2016 QO_{16}	—	August 26, 2016	Haleakala	Pan-STARRS 1	·	1.4 km	MPC · JPL
843970	2016 QP_{17}	—	August 26, 2016	Haleakala	Pan-STARRS 1	·	1.1 km	MPC · JPL
843971	2016 QN_{22}	—	June 18, 2015	Haleakala	Pan-STARRS 1	·	1.3 km	MPC · JPL
843972	2016 QW_{22}	—	September 16, 2009	Mount Lemmon	Mount Lemmon Survey	·	650 m	MPC · JPL
843973	2016 QS_{27}	—	August 30, 2011	Haleakala	Pan-STARRS 1	·	1.4 km	MPC · JPL
843974	2016 QW_{29}	—	July 10, 2016	Mount Lemmon	Mount Lemmon Survey	·	770 m	MPC · JPL
843975	2016 QA_{30}	—	December 9, 2012	Haleakala	Pan-STARRS 1	·	1.3 km	MPC · JPL
843976	2016 QY_{30}	—	August 2, 2016	Haleakala	Pan-STARRS 1	·	1.2 km	MPC · JPL
843977	2016 QX_{32}	—	July 11, 2016	Haleakala	Pan-STARRS 1	·	1.1 km	MPC · JPL
843978	2016 QH_{33}	—	October 24, 2013	Mount Lemmon	Mount Lemmon Survey	·	500 m	MPC · JPL
843979	2016 QN_{36}	—	August 3, 2016	Haleakala	Pan-STARRS 1	HOF	1.8 km	MPC · JPL
843980	2016 QV_{37}	—	September 24, 2012	Kitt Peak	Spacewatch	·	1.0 km	MPC · JPL
843981	2016 QP_{39}	—	May 11, 2010	WISE	WISE	·	3.5 km	MPC · JPL
843982	2016 QA_{41}	—	August 12, 2016	Haleakala	Pan-STARRS 1	MRX	760 m	MPC · JPL
843983	2016 QC_{41}	—	September 14, 2012	ASC-Kislovodsk	Nevski, V., A. Novichonok	·	1 km	MPC · JPL
843984	2016 QK_{42}	—	October 18, 2012	Haleakala	Pan-STARRS 1	·	800 m	MPC · JPL
843985	2016 QW_{42}	—	August 26, 2016	Haleakala	Pan-STARRS 1	·	2.0 km	MPC · JPL
843986	2016 QJ_{45}	—	July 7, 2016	Mount Lemmon	Mount Lemmon Survey	H	340 m	MPC · JPL
843987	2016 QG_{48}	—	August 27, 2016	Haleakala	Pan-STARRS 1	·	1.5 km	MPC · JPL
843988	2016 QE_{49}	—	September 26, 2003	Sacramento Peak	SDSS	HNS	1.1 km	MPC · JPL
843989	2016 QF_{49}	—	August 27, 2016	Haleakala	Pan-STARRS 1	·	940 m	MPC · JPL
843990	2016 QM_{49}	—	September 3, 2007	Catalina	CSS	·	1.3 km	MPC · JPL
843991	2016 QU_{49}	—	September 4, 2007	Mount Lemmon	Mount Lemmon Survey	·	890 m	MPC · JPL
843992	2016 QG_{52}	—	August 14, 2016	Haleakala	Pan-STARRS 1	H	300 m	MPC · JPL
843993	2016 QJ_{52}	—	March 31, 2010	WISE	WISE	·	2.5 km	MPC · JPL
843994	2016 QB_{53}	—	August 14, 2016	Haleakala	Pan-STARRS 1	EOS	1.4 km	MPC · JPL
843995	2016 QX_{54}	—	April 22, 2010	WISE	WISE	·	3.7 km	MPC · JPL
843996	2016 QD_{56}	—	August 13, 2007	Palomar Mountain	M. E. Schwamb, M. E. Brown	·	1.4 km	MPC · JPL
843997	2016 QQ_{57}	—	February 23, 2015	Haleakala	Pan-STARRS 1	·	1.6 km	MPC · JPL
843998	2016 QL_{59}	—	August 3, 2016	Haleakala	Pan-STARRS 1	·	1.4 km	MPC · JPL
843999	2016 QY_{60}	—	July 7, 2016	Haleakala	Pan-STARRS 1	·	1.0 km	MPC · JPL
844000	2016 QU_{62}	—	August 28, 2016	Mount Lemmon	Mount Lemmon Survey	·	1.4 km	MPC · JPL

== Meaning of names ==
As minor planet discoveries are confirmed, they are given a permanent number by the IAU's Minor Planet Center (MPC), and the discoverers can then submit names for them, following the IAU's naming conventions. The list below concerns those minor planets in the specified number-range that have received names, and explains the meanings of those names.

Official naming citations of newly named small Solar System bodies are approved and published in a bulletin by IAU's Working Group for Small Bodies Nomenclature (WGSBN). Before May 2021, citations were published in MPC's Minor Planet Circulars for many decades. Recent citations can also be found on the JPL Small-Body Database (SBDB). Until his death in 2016, German astronomer Lutz D. Schmadel compiled these citations into the Dictionary of Minor Planet Names (DMP) and regularly updated the collection.

Based on Paul Herget's The Names of the Minor Planets, Schmadel also researched the unclear origin of numerous asteroids, most of which had been named prior to World War II. This article incorporates text from this source, which is in the public domain: SBDB New namings may only be added to this list below after official publication as the preannouncement of names is condemned. The WGSBN publishes a comprehensive guideline for the naming rules of non-cometary small Solar System bodies.

Named minor planet	Provisional	This minor planet was named for...	Ref · Catalog
843293 Tănăselia	2016 EI_{90}	Claudiu Tănăselia, Romanian physicist.	IAU · 843293
