= (508338) 2015 SO20 =

Trans-Neptunian object

(508338) 2015 SO_{20}
Discovery
- Discovered by: M. E. Schwamb
- Discovery site: La Silla Obs.
- Discovery date: 8 October 2010

Designations
- Alternative designations: 2010 TF_{182}
- Minor planet category: TNO · E-SDO distant · detached extreme

Orbital characteristics
- Epoch 4 September 2017 (JD 2458000.5)
- Uncertainty parameter 2
- Observation arc: 6.96 yr (2,543 days)
- Aphelion: 290.09 AU
- Perihelion: 33.164 AU
- Semi-major axis: 161.63 AU
- Eccentricity: 0.7948
- Orbital period (sidereal): 2054.81 yr (750,519 d)
- Mean anomaly: 0.0032°
- Mean motion: 0° 0^{m} 1.8^{s} / day
- Inclination: 23.451°
- Longitude of ascending node: 33.619°
- Argument of perihelion: 354.80°

Physical characteristics
- Dimensions: 221 km (calculated); 222 km (calculated)
- Geometric albedo: 0.08 (assumed); 0.09 (assumed)
- Spectral type: Prominent water (H_{2}O/"bowl" type)
- Absolute magnitude (H): 6.5 · 6.7

(508338) 2015 SO_{20} is an extreme trans-Neptunian object and extended scattered disc object from the outermost region of the Solar System, approximately 220 kilometers (140 miles) in diameter.

== Description ==
2015 SO_{20} was first observed as 2010 TF_{182} on 8 October 2010, by American astronomer Megan Schwamb at ESO's La Silla Observatory in northern Chile. It has also been observed as 2015 SO_{20} during the Calar Alto TNO Survey (Z79) at the Calar Alto Observatory, Spain, on 20 September 2015.

It orbits the Sun at a distance of 33.2–290.1 AU once every 2054 years and 9 months (semi-major axis of 161 AU). Its orbit has an eccentricity of 0.79 and an inclination of 23° with respect to the ecliptic.

=== Extended scattered disc ===
It is one of a small number of detached objects with perihelion distances of 30 AU or more, and semi-major axes of 150 AU or more. Such objects can not reach such orbits without some perturbing object, which leads to the speculation of Planet Nine.

=== Physical characteristics ===
Based on an absolute magnitude of 6.5 and an assumed albedo of 0.09, Johnston's Archive calculated a mean-diameter of 222 kilometers. Michael Brown estimates an albedo of 0.08 with a diameter of 221 kilometers using an absolute magnitude of 6.7.

== See also ==
- Planets beyond Neptune
