= (528381) 2008 ST291 =

Trans-Neptunian object

(528381) 2008 ST_{291}
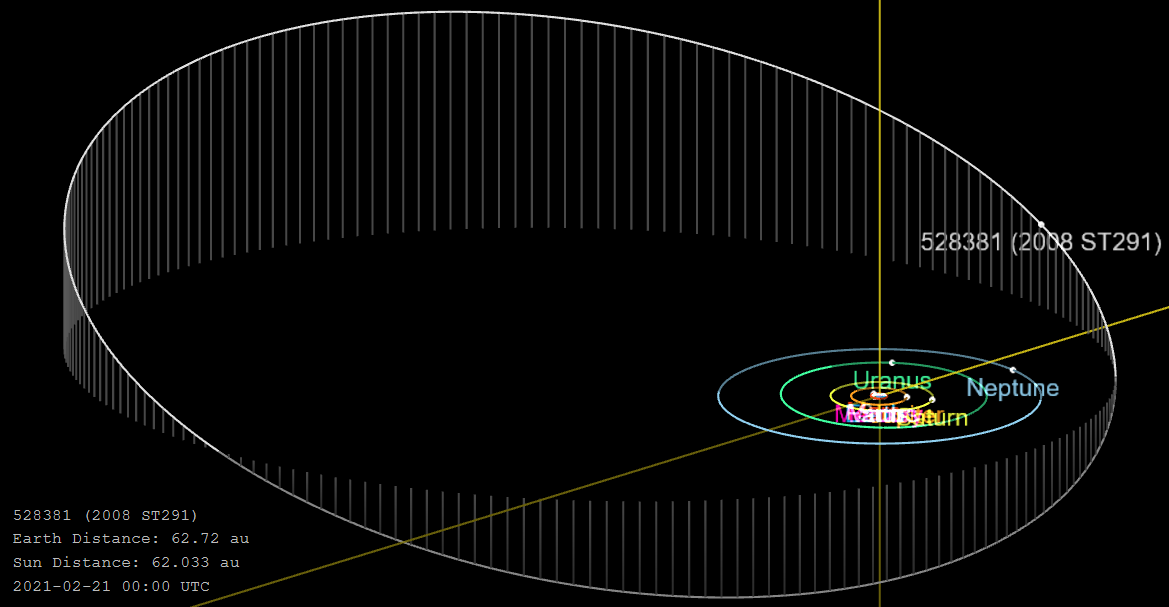
- Orbit of (528381) 2008 ST_{291}

Discovery
- Discovered by: M. E. Schwamb; M. E. Brown; D. L. Rabinowitz
- Discovery site: Palomar Obs.
- Discovery date: 24 September 2008

Designations
- Minor planet category: TNO · SDO res 1:6

Orbital characteristics
- Epoch 27 April 2019 (JD 2458600.5)
- Uncertainty parameter 3
- Observation arc: 9.27 yr (3,385 d)
- Aphelion: 157.437 AU (23.5522 Tm)
- Perihelion: 42.3114440 AU (6.32970193 Tm)
- Semi-major axis: 99.8742972 AU (14.94098220 Tm)
- Eccentricity: 0.5763530
- Orbital period (sidereal): 998.30 yr (364,629 d)
- Mean anomaly: 23.349°
- Mean motion: 0° 0^{m} 3.6^{s} / day
- Inclination: 20.758°
- Longitude of ascending node: 330.97°
- Argument of perihelion: 324.65°
- Known satellites: 0

Physical characteristics
- Mean diameter: 549 km (est.); 536 km (est.); 612 km (Note: Based on AstDyS magnitude and same 0.09 albedo as Brown using Bruton formula); 345–773 km (Note: Based on averaged magnitude of 4.433 and typically assumed minor planet albedo range of 0.05 ~ 0.25, using Bruton formula)
- Geometric albedo: 0.09 (assumed); 0.126 (assumed)
- Apparent magnitude: 22.24
- Absolute magnitude (H): 4.22; 4.3; 4.6

(528381) 2008 ST_{291} is a 1:6 resonant trans-Neptunian object located in the outermost region of the Solar System that takes almost a thousand years to complete an orbit around the Sun. It was discovered on 24 September 2008 by American astronomers Megan Schwamb, Michael Brown and David Rabinowitz at the Palomar Observatory in California, with no known earlier precovery images.

== Numbering and naming ==
This minor planet was numbered by the Minor Planet Center on 18 May 2019 (M.P.C. 114657). As of 2025, it has not been named.

== Orbit and classification ==
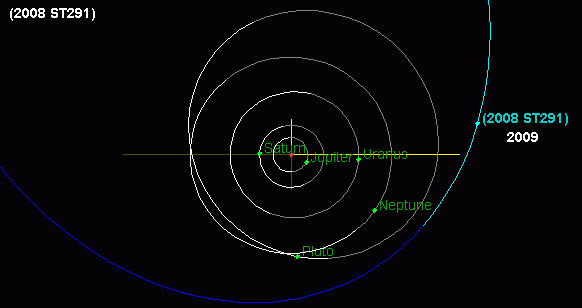
Orbit comparison of 2008 ST_{291}, Pluto and Neptune

2008 ST_{291} is located at the 1:6 Neptune resonance of 99 AU meaning that it completes roughly 1 orbit for every 6 orbits Neptune makes. It orbits the Sun at a distance of 42.3–157.5 AU once every 998 years and 4 months (semi-major axis of 99.89 AU). Its orbit has an eccentricity of 0.58 and an inclination of 21° with respect to the ecliptic. Currently located at 60.9 AU from the Sun, 2008 ST_{291} came to perihelion in 1954.

== Physical characteristics ==
Based on an absolute magnitude of 4.4, 2008 ST_{291} is estimated by Johnston's Archive to be about 536 kilometres (333 mi) in diameter, assuming a typical albedo of 0.126 for other Neptune resonant objects. Astronomer Mike Brown estimates a slightly bigger 549 kilometres (341 mi) km using a albedo of 0.09 and a fainter 4.6 magnitude. The Asteroid Dynamic Site records a brighter 4.3 magnitude, which calculates to 612 kilometres (380 mi) using the same albedo (and same formula as brown); using the average of these magnitudes and a standard assumed minor planet albedo range of 0.25 ~ 0.05, possible sizes of 345–773 kilometres (214–480 mi) are produced.

== See also ==
- List of trans-Neptunian objects
