= Megan Schwamb =

American planetary scientist

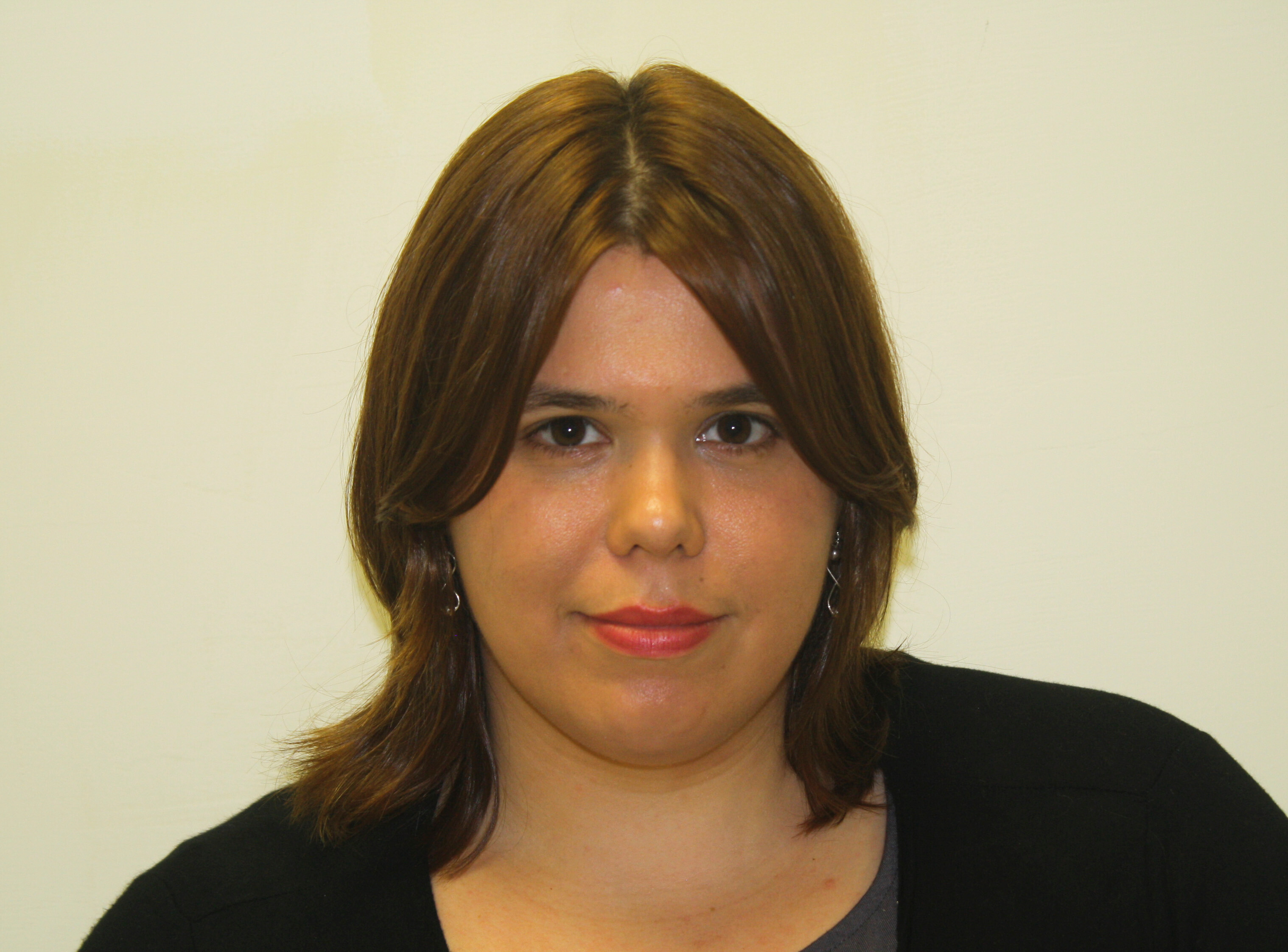
- Schwamb in 2015
- Born: 1984 (age 41–42); Huntsville, Alabama, U.S.
- Education: University of Pennsylvania (B.A.); California Institute of Technology (M.S., Ph.D.)
- Known for: Discovery of 225088 Gonggong and other trans-Neptunian objects, Citizen Science projects, Astrotweeps
- Awards: Carl Sagan Medal (2017)
- Scientific career
- Fields: Planetary astronomy
- Workplaces: Yale University; Academia Sinica; Gemini Observatory; Queen's University Belfast
- Thesis: Beyond Sedna: Probing the Distant Solar System
- Doctoral advisor: Michael E. Brown
- Website: megschwamb.com

Megan E. Schwamb (born 1984) is an American astronomer and planetary scientist, and lecturer at Queen's University, Belfast. Schwamb has discovered and co-discovered several trans-Neptunian objects, and is involved with Citizen science projects such as Planet Four and Planet Hunters.

== Biography ==
In 2006, Schwamb graduated from the University of Pennsylvania with a B.A. summa cum laude with Distinction in physics. She went on to study astrophysics in the California Institute of Technology, graduated Master of Science in 2008. Schwamb finished her Ph.D. in planetary science in 2011, also from the California Institute of Technology. Her thesis was researching "Beyond Sedna: Probing the Distant Solar System", and her advisor was Michael Brown.

Between 2010 and 2013, Schwamb was a postdoctoral fellow at Yale University. She worked at the Institute of Astronomy and Astrophysics at Academia Sinica in Taipei in Republic of China (Taiwan) from 2013 until 2016. Schwamb then held the post of assistant scientist at the Gemini Observatory, before moving to Queen's University, Belfast. She is the creator and co-founder of Astrotweeps, a Rotation Curation account on astronomy.

Schwamb is involved in citizen science projects. She is a founding science team member for Planet Four, a project intended for mapping seasonal fans on the South Pole of Mars. She is also part of the science team leading Planet Hunters, a project in which users analyze data from the NASA Kepler Space Mission while searching for exoplanets.

== Awards and honors ==
In 2017 she received a Carl Sagan Medal for excellence in public communication, for the creation of the Astrotweeps and Planet Four projects. On April 13, 2017, asteroid 11814 Schwamb, discovered by Schelte Bus at the Siding Spring Observatory in 1981, was named in her honor (M.P.C. 103979).

== Research discoveries ==
She specialized in studying sednoids, and co-discovered several trans-Neptunian objects.

=== List of discovered minor planets ===
Megan Schwamb is credited by the Minor Planet Center with the discovery and co-discovery of 16 minor planets during 2007–2010 (see list). In addition to the confirmed discoveries, she also participated in the first observations of the unnumbered objects 2008 ST291, 2012 HG_{84} and 2012 KU_{50}.

(187661) 2007 JG_{43}	May 10, 2007	list^{[A]}^{[B]}
225088 Gonggong	July 17, 2007	list^{[A]}^{[B]}
229762 Gǃkúnǁʼhòmdímà	October 19, 2007	list^{[A]}^{[B]}
(305543) 2008 QY_{40}	August 25, 2008	list^{[A]}^{[B]}
(315530) 2008 AP129	January 11, 2008	list^{[A]}
(382004) 2010 RM_{64}	September 9, 2010	list^{[B]}^{[C]}
(386096) 2007 PR_{44}	August 7, 2007	list^{[A]}
(445473) 2010 VZ98	November 11, 2010	list^{[B]}^{[C]}
(471196) 2010 PK_{66}	August 14, 2010	list^{[B]}^{[C]}
(471210) 2010 VW_{11}	November 3, 2010	list^{[B]}^{[C]}

(499522) 2010 PL_{66}	August 14, 2010	list^{[B]}^{[C]}
(504555) 2008 SO_{266}	September 24, 2008	list^{[A]}^{[B]}
(508338) 2015 SO20	October 8, 2010	list
(523618) 2007 RT_{15}	September 11, 2007	list^{[A]}^{[B]}
(523629) 2008 SP_{266}	September 26, 2008	list^{[A]}^{[B]}
(528381) 2008 ST_{291}	September 24, 2008	list^{[A]}^{[B]}
Co-discovery made with:^{A} M. E. Brown^{B} D. L. Rabinowitz^{C} S. Tourtellotte
