= HS3 =

HS3 or HS-3 may refer to:

== Transport ==
- Curtiss HS-3, a patrol flying boat built for the United States Navy during World War I
- Helicopter Anti-Submarine Squadron 3, a United States Navy unit
- High Speed 3, a proposal to improve rail links in northern England

== Other uses ==
- HS3, a part of the British HS postcode area
- 2008 HS3, an asteroid
