= List of minor planets: 528001–529000 =

The following is a partial list of minor planets, running from minor-planet number 528001 through 529000, inclusive. The primary data for this and other partial lists is based on JPL's "Small-Body Orbital Elements" and data available from the Minor Planet Center. Critical list information is also provided by the MPC, unless otherwise specified from Lowell Observatory. A detailed description of the table's columns and additional sources are given on the main page including a complete list of every page in this series, and a statistical break-up on the dynamical classification of minor planets.

Also see the summary list of all named bodies in numerical and alphabetical order, and the corresponding naming citations for the number range of this particular list. New namings may only be added to this list after official publication, as the preannouncement of names is condemned by the Working Group for Small Bodies Nomenclature of the International Astronomical Union.

Near-Earth obj.	MBA (inner)	MBA (outer)	Centaur
Mars-crosser	MBA (middle)	Jupiter trojan	Trans-Neptunian obj.
Unclassified

== 528001–528100 ==
Designation			Discovery			Properties		Ref
Permanent	Provisional	Named after	Date	Site	Discoverer(s)	Category	Diam.	Ref
528001	2008 EF_{133}	—	March 11, 2008	Mount Lemmon	Mount Lemmon Survey	·	2.2 km	MPC · JPL
528002	2008 EW_{136}	—	March 11, 2008	Kitt Peak	Spacewatch	VER	2.1 km	MPC · JPL
528003	2008 EB_{146}	—	March 7, 2008	Mount Lemmon	Mount Lemmon Survey	NYS	850 m	MPC · JPL
528004	2008 EO_{153}	—	March 12, 2008	Mount Lemmon	Mount Lemmon Survey	·	2.4 km	MPC · JPL
528005	2008 EO_{157}	—	March 10, 2008	Mount Lemmon	Mount Lemmon Survey	·	960 m	MPC · JPL
528006	2008 EV_{158}	—	March 11, 2008	Mount Lemmon	Mount Lemmon Survey	·	910 m	MPC · JPL
528007	2008 EW_{158}	—	March 11, 2008	Mount Lemmon	Mount Lemmon Survey	TIR	2.3 km	MPC · JPL
528008	2008 EB_{160}	—	March 11, 2008	Kitt Peak	Spacewatch	·	2.4 km	MPC · JPL
528009	2008 EA_{161}	—	March 4, 2008	Mount Lemmon	Mount Lemmon Survey	·	2.1 km	MPC · JPL
528010	2008 EF_{162}	—	February 9, 2008	Mount Lemmon	Mount Lemmon Survey	THM	2.0 km	MPC · JPL
528011	2008 EP_{162}	—	March 13, 2008	Kitt Peak	Spacewatch	EOS	1.4 km	MPC · JPL
528012	2008 ER_{162}	—	March 13, 2008	Kitt Peak	Spacewatch	·	2.3 km	MPC · JPL
528013	2008 EA_{163}	—	March 5, 2008	Mount Lemmon	Mount Lemmon Survey	·	2.5 km	MPC · JPL
528014	2008 EG_{163}	—	March 11, 2008	Kitt Peak	Spacewatch	L5	8.2 km	MPC · JPL
528015	2008 EK_{163}	—	March 11, 2008	Mount Lemmon	Mount Lemmon Survey	·	2.7 km	MPC · JPL
528016	2008 EF_{165}	—	March 2, 2008	Kitt Peak	Spacewatch	·	2.3 km	MPC · JPL
528017	2008 EJ_{165}	—	February 11, 2008	Kitt Peak	Spacewatch	·	1.2 km	MPC · JPL
528018	2008 EQ_{165}	—	March 3, 2008	XuYi	PMO NEO Survey Program	·	2.4 km	MPC · JPL
528019	2008 EX_{166}	—	March 7, 2008	Catalina	CSS	·	2.8 km	MPC · JPL
528020	2008 EN_{168}	—	March 11, 2008	Mount Lemmon	Mount Lemmon Survey	·	2.8 km	MPC · JPL
528021	2008 EG_{171}	—	March 10, 2008	Kitt Peak	Spacewatch	·	1.1 km	MPC · JPL
528022	2008 EH_{171}	—	March 8, 2008	Kitt Peak	Spacewatch	V	650 m	MPC · JPL
528023	2008 EY_{171}	—	March 1, 2008	Kitt Peak	Spacewatch	·	1.3 km	MPC · JPL
528024	2008 EZ_{171}	—	March 6, 2008	Catalina	CSS	·	680 m	MPC · JPL
528025	2008 FA_{2}	—	February 13, 2008	Kitt Peak	Spacewatch	·	2.0 km	MPC · JPL
528026	2008 FN_{3}	—	February 9, 2008	Kitt Peak	Spacewatch	·	860 m	MPC · JPL
528027	2008 FS_{4}	—	February 27, 2008	Mount Lemmon	Mount Lemmon Survey	·	2.7 km	MPC · JPL
528028	2008 FC_{8}	—	February 8, 2008	Kitt Peak	Spacewatch	NYS	710 m	MPC · JPL
528029	2008 FH_{9}	—	February 8, 2008	Kitt Peak	Spacewatch	·	2.0 km	MPC · JPL
528030	2008 FQ_{17}	—	February 8, 2008	Kitt Peak	Spacewatch	·	780 m	MPC · JPL
528031	2008 FF_{18}	—	February 28, 2008	Kitt Peak	Spacewatch	·	770 m	MPC · JPL
528032	2008 FJ_{19}	—	March 27, 2008	Mount Lemmon	Mount Lemmon Survey	THM	2.0 km	MPC · JPL
528033	2008 FM_{20}	—	March 6, 2008	Kitt Peak	Spacewatch	NYS	1.1 km	MPC · JPL
528034	2008 FA_{24}	—	March 27, 2008	Kitt Peak	Spacewatch	·	2.4 km	MPC · JPL
528035	2008 FT_{24}	—	March 27, 2008	Kitt Peak	Spacewatch	·	1 km	MPC · JPL
528036	2008 FM_{30}	—	February 28, 2008	Mount Lemmon	Mount Lemmon Survey	EOS	1.5 km	MPC · JPL
528037	2008 FD_{35}	—	February 2, 2008	Mount Lemmon	Mount Lemmon Survey	·	2.3 km	MPC · JPL
528038	2008 FL_{37}	—	March 10, 2008	Mount Lemmon	Mount Lemmon Survey	·	770 m	MPC · JPL
528039	2008 FM_{37}	—	March 28, 2008	Kitt Peak	Spacewatch	·	1.3 km	MPC · JPL
528040	2008 FV_{37}	—	March 10, 2008	Kitt Peak	Spacewatch	critical	670 m	MPC · JPL
528041	2008 FU_{38}	—	March 6, 2008	Kitt Peak	Spacewatch	·	1.0 km	MPC · JPL
528042	2008 FT_{40}	—	March 28, 2008	Kitt Peak	Spacewatch	ADE	1.7 km	MPC · JPL
528043	2008 FY_{45}	—	March 28, 2008	Mount Lemmon	Mount Lemmon Survey	MAS	570 m	MPC · JPL
528044	2008 FM_{46}	—	March 11, 2008	Mount Lemmon	Mount Lemmon Survey	·	2.6 km	MPC · JPL
528045	2008 FK_{49}	—	March 8, 2008	Kitt Peak	Spacewatch	NYS	810 m	MPC · JPL
528046	2008 FO_{49}	—	March 12, 2008	Kitt Peak	Spacewatch	MAS	580 m	MPC · JPL
528047	2008 FC_{52}	—	March 28, 2008	Mount Lemmon	Mount Lemmon Survey	·	910 m	MPC · JPL
528048	2008 FW_{52}	—	March 28, 2008	Mount Lemmon	Mount Lemmon Survey	·	970 m	MPC · JPL
528049	2008 FA_{58}	—	March 28, 2008	Kitt Peak	Spacewatch	·	2.9 km	MPC · JPL
528050	2008 FC_{62}	—	February 26, 2008	Mount Lemmon	Mount Lemmon Survey	NYS	810 m	MPC · JPL
528051	2008 FH_{62}	—	February 2, 2008	Mount Lemmon	Mount Lemmon Survey	EUN	1.1 km	MPC · JPL
528052	2008 FN_{64}	—	February 10, 2008	Kitt Peak	Spacewatch	·	2.2 km	MPC · JPL
528053	2008 FG_{65}	—	March 28, 2008	Kitt Peak	Spacewatch	·	2.2 km	MPC · JPL
528054	2008 FV_{65}	—	March 28, 2008	Mount Lemmon	Mount Lemmon Survey	·	1.1 km	MPC · JPL
528055	2008 FF_{66}	—	March 28, 2008	Kitt Peak	Spacewatch	·	1.5 km	MPC · JPL
528056	2008 FE_{73}	—	October 28, 2005	Mount Lemmon	Mount Lemmon Survey	·	2.7 km	MPC · JPL
528057	2008 FA_{77}	—	March 27, 2008	Mount Lemmon	Mount Lemmon Survey	·	2.1 km	MPC · JPL
528058	2008 FA_{79}	—	March 27, 2008	Mount Lemmon	Mount Lemmon Survey	·	1.9 km	MPC · JPL
528059	2008 FE_{81}	—	March 27, 2008	Mount Lemmon	Mount Lemmon Survey	·	860 m	MPC · JPL
528060	2008 FT_{83}	—	March 4, 2008	Mount Lemmon	Mount Lemmon Survey	HYG	2.3 km	MPC · JPL
528061	2008 FY_{86}	—	March 5, 2008	Kitt Peak	Spacewatch	THM	2.4 km	MPC · JPL
528062	2008 FQ_{89}	—	January 18, 2008	Kitt Peak	Spacewatch	·	2.0 km	MPC · JPL
528063	2008 FQ_{90}	—	February 8, 2008	Kitt Peak	Spacewatch	LIX	2.8 km	MPC · JPL
528064	2008 FX_{90}	—	February 7, 2008	Kitt Peak	Spacewatch	(1118)	2.7 km	MPC · JPL
528065	2008 FR_{93}	—	March 29, 2008	Kitt Peak	Spacewatch	·	2.4 km	MPC · JPL
528066	2008 FZ_{94}	—	March 29, 2008	Kitt Peak	Spacewatch	NYS	1.0 km	MPC · JPL
528067	2008 FF_{99}	—	March 30, 2008	Kitt Peak	Spacewatch	·	2.0 km	MPC · JPL
528068	2008 FD_{102}	—	March 30, 2008	Kitt Peak	Spacewatch	·	2.5 km	MPC · JPL
528069	2008 FY_{102}	—	March 30, 2008	Kitt Peak	Spacewatch	·	2.1 km	MPC · JPL
528070	2008 FA_{104}	—	March 30, 2008	Kitt Peak	Spacewatch	·	2.1 km	MPC · JPL
528071	2008 FE_{104}	—	March 30, 2008	Kitt Peak	Spacewatch	·	930 m	MPC · JPL
528072	2008 FJ_{105}	—	February 29, 2008	Kitt Peak	Spacewatch	·	2.3 km	MPC · JPL
528073	2008 FV_{105}	—	March 31, 2008	Kitt Peak	Spacewatch	·	710 m	MPC · JPL
528074	2008 FF_{106}	—	March 30, 2008	Socorro	LINEAR	THB	3.8 km	MPC · JPL
528075	2008 FS_{108}	—	March 31, 2008	Mount Lemmon	Mount Lemmon Survey	NYS	920 m	MPC · JPL
528076	2008 FX_{108}	—	March 31, 2008	Mount Lemmon	Mount Lemmon Survey	·	2.3 km	MPC · JPL
528077	2008 FJ_{117}	—	March 31, 2008	Kitt Peak	Spacewatch	THB	2.6 km	MPC · JPL
528078	2008 FO_{117}	—	March 31, 2008	Kitt Peak	Spacewatch	·	1.4 km	MPC · JPL
528079	2008 FZ_{121}	—	March 31, 2008	Mount Lemmon	Mount Lemmon Survey	·	2.9 km	MPC · JPL
528080	2008 FB_{122}	—	February 28, 2008	Kitt Peak	Spacewatch	·	2.6 km	MPC · JPL
528081	2008 FH_{122}	—	March 14, 2008	Catalina	CSS	·	1.6 km	MPC · JPL
528082	2008 FC_{123}	—	March 28, 2008	Mount Lemmon	Mount Lemmon Survey	·	2.4 km	MPC · JPL
528083	2008 FL_{123}	—	March 28, 2008	Kitt Peak	Spacewatch	·	1.6 km	MPC · JPL
528084	2008 FQ_{123}	—	March 29, 2008	Kitt Peak	Spacewatch	·	1.0 km	MPC · JPL
528085	2008 FC_{125}	—	March 30, 2008	Kitt Peak	Spacewatch	·	1.8 km	MPC · JPL
528086	2008 FJ_{125}	—	March 31, 2008	Kitt Peak	Spacewatch	L5	7.8 km	MPC · JPL
528087	2008 FP_{125}	—	March 31, 2008	Kitt Peak	Spacewatch	·	2.3 km	MPC · JPL
528088	2008 FF_{133}	—	March 31, 2008	Kitt Peak	Spacewatch	L5	7.2 km	MPC · JPL
528089	2008 FX_{136}	—	March 29, 2008	Mount Lemmon	Mount Lemmon Survey	·	1.9 km	MPC · JPL
528090	2008 FP_{138}	—	March 31, 2008	Mount Lemmon	Mount Lemmon Survey	·	2.3 km	MPC · JPL
528091	2008 FS_{138}	—	March 27, 2008	Mount Lemmon	Mount Lemmon Survey	EUN	990 m	MPC · JPL
528092	2008 FB_{139}	—	March 31, 2008	Mount Lemmon	Mount Lemmon Survey	·	2.9 km	MPC · JPL
528093	2008 GR_{2}	—	March 10, 2008	Kitt Peak	Spacewatch	NYS	780 m	MPC · JPL
528094	2008 GU_{4}	—	March 3, 2008	XuYi	PMO NEO Survey Program	PHO	660 m	MPC · JPL
528095	2008 GZ_{8}	—	April 1, 2008	Mount Lemmon	Mount Lemmon Survey	·	1.1 km	MPC · JPL
528096	2008 GA_{9}	—	March 4, 2008	Mount Lemmon	Mount Lemmon Survey	NYS	840 m	MPC · JPL
528097	2008 GE_{20}	—	April 8, 2008	Desert Eagle	W. K. Y. Yeung	·	2.4 km	MPC · JPL
528098	2008 GQ_{20}	—	April 5, 2008	Mount Lemmon	Mount Lemmon Survey	·	1.0 km	MPC · JPL
528099	2008 GB_{22}	—	February 13, 2008	Kitt Peak	Spacewatch	·	1.6 km	MPC · JPL
528100	2008 GY_{28}	—	March 5, 2008	Kitt Peak	Spacewatch	·	2.2 km	MPC · JPL

== 528101–528200 ==
back to top

Designation			Discovery			Properties		Ref
Permanent	Provisional	Named after	Date	Site	Discoverer(s)	Category	Diam.	Ref
528101	2008 GA_{29}	—	April 3, 2008	Catalina	CSS	·	2.5 km	MPC · JPL
528102	2008 GM_{30}	—	March 5, 2008	Kitt Peak	Spacewatch	MAS	520 m	MPC · JPL
528103	2008 GQ_{30}	—	April 3, 2008	Mount Lemmon	Mount Lemmon Survey	·	1.9 km	MPC · JPL
528104	2008 GZ_{31}	—	April 3, 2008	Kitt Peak	Spacewatch	·	2.1 km	MPC · JPL
528105	2008 GU_{32}	—	March 30, 2008	Kitt Peak	Spacewatch	·	2.2 km	MPC · JPL
528106	2008 GS_{34}	—	March 15, 2008	Mount Lemmon	Mount Lemmon Survey	·	900 m	MPC · JPL
528107	2008 GA_{35}	—	March 2, 2008	Kitt Peak	Spacewatch	·	960 m	MPC · JPL
528108	2008 GQ_{35}	—	April 3, 2008	Kitt Peak	Spacewatch	·	2.8 km	MPC · JPL
528109	2008 GX_{46}	—	April 4, 2008	Kitt Peak	Spacewatch	·	1.7 km	MPC · JPL
528110	2008 GQ_{47}	—	April 4, 2008	Kitt Peak	Spacewatch	L5	8.9 km	MPC · JPL
528111	2008 GL_{48}	—	April 5, 2008	Mount Lemmon	Mount Lemmon Survey	·	2.2 km	MPC · JPL
528112	2008 GN_{48}	—	April 5, 2008	Kitt Peak	Spacewatch	·	1.8 km	MPC · JPL
528113	2008 GV_{48}	—	March 2, 2008	Kitt Peak	Spacewatch	·	840 m	MPC · JPL
528114	2008 GD_{50}	—	April 1, 2008	Kitt Peak	Spacewatch	L5	7.5 km	MPC · JPL
528115	2008 GV_{54}	—	March 6, 2008	Kitt Peak	Spacewatch	MAS	630 m	MPC · JPL
528116	2008 GC_{58}	—	March 28, 2008	Mount Lemmon	Mount Lemmon Survey	MAS	750 m	MPC · JPL
528117	2008 GA_{61}	—	April 5, 2008	Mount Lemmon	Mount Lemmon Survey	·	2.6 km	MPC · JPL
528118	2008 GD_{64}	—	March 31, 2008	Kitt Peak	Spacewatch	PHO	1.3 km	MPC · JPL
528119	2008 GF_{66}	—	March 12, 2008	Kitt Peak	Spacewatch	·	2.1 km	MPC · JPL
528120	2008 GK_{66}	—	March 29, 2008	Kitt Peak	Spacewatch	·	900 m	MPC · JPL
528121	2008 GU_{68}	—	April 6, 2008	Kitt Peak	Spacewatch	·	840 m	MPC · JPL
528122	2008 GA_{75}	—	April 7, 2008	Kitt Peak	Spacewatch	·	2.7 km	MPC · JPL
528123	2008 GL_{77}	—	March 30, 2008	Kitt Peak	Spacewatch	·	2.5 km	MPC · JPL
528124	2008 GL_{79}	—	April 7, 2008	Kitt Peak	Spacewatch	·	950 m	MPC · JPL
528125	2008 GZ_{80}	—	March 31, 2008	Mount Lemmon	Mount Lemmon Survey	·	1.2 km	MPC · JPL
528126	2008 GH_{82}	—	April 8, 2008	Kitt Peak	Spacewatch	EOS	1.6 km	MPC · JPL
528127	2008 GZ_{82}	—	March 28, 2008	Kitt Peak	Spacewatch	LIX	3.2 km	MPC · JPL
528128	2008 GS_{86}	—	October 22, 2006	Catalina	CSS	·	1.1 km	MPC · JPL
528129	2008 GY_{88}	—	March 29, 2008	Mount Lemmon	Mount Lemmon Survey	·	2.4 km	MPC · JPL
528130	2008 GS_{91}	—	March 13, 2008	Kitt Peak	Spacewatch	·	1.9 km	MPC · JPL
528131	2008 GO_{92}	—	March 28, 2008	Mount Lemmon	Mount Lemmon Survey	·	1.6 km	MPC · JPL
528132	2008 GQ_{92}	—	March 29, 2008	Mount Lemmon	Mount Lemmon Survey	MAS	580 m	MPC · JPL
528133	2008 GW_{96}	—	April 8, 2008	Kitt Peak	Spacewatch	NYS	960 m	MPC · JPL
528134	2008 GW_{98}	—	April 9, 2008	Kitt Peak	Spacewatch	H	410 m	MPC · JPL
528135	2008 GG_{99}	—	February 27, 2008	Mount Lemmon	Mount Lemmon Survey	·	1.1 km	MPC · JPL
528136	2008 GO_{104}	—	February 12, 2008	Mount Lemmon	Mount Lemmon Survey	THB	2.4 km	MPC · JPL
528137	2008 GE_{113}	—	April 14, 2008	Catalina	CSS	T_{j} (2.98)	3.3 km	MPC · JPL
528138	2008 GA_{122}	—	April 13, 2008	Kitt Peak	Spacewatch	NYS	1.1 km	MPC · JPL
528139	2008 GY_{122}	—	April 13, 2008	Kitt Peak	Spacewatch	·	2.2 km	MPC · JPL
528140	2008 GO_{124}	—	April 14, 2008	Mount Lemmon	Mount Lemmon Survey	·	2.2 km	MPC · JPL
528141	2008 GF_{127}	—	April 14, 2008	Mount Lemmon	Mount Lemmon Survey	·	1.7 km	MPC · JPL
528142	2008 GJ_{130}	—	April 5, 2008	Mount Lemmon	Mount Lemmon Survey	·	3.1 km	MPC · JPL
528143	2008 GD_{131}	—	April 7, 2008	Kitt Peak	Spacewatch	·	1.1 km	MPC · JPL
528144	2008 GO_{133}	—	April 4, 2008	Kitt Peak	Spacewatch	·	810 m	MPC · JPL
528145	2008 GA_{138}	—	April 11, 2008	Kitt Peak	Spacewatch	·	2.5 km	MPC · JPL
528146	2008 GZ_{139}	—	April 6, 2008	Kitt Peak	Spacewatch	THB	2.1 km	MPC · JPL
528147	2008 GN_{141}	—	April 15, 2008	Mount Lemmon	Mount Lemmon Survey	·	2.7 km	MPC · JPL
528148	2008 GP_{141}	—	April 1, 2008	Kitt Peak	Spacewatch	L5	6.8 km	MPC · JPL
528149	2008 GL_{143}	—	March 31, 2008	Catalina	CSS	·	3.1 km	MPC · JPL
528150	2008 GT_{148}	—	April 19, 2004	Kitt Peak	Spacewatch	·	1.3 km	MPC · JPL
528151	2008 GZ_{148}	—	April 3, 2008	Mount Lemmon	Mount Lemmon Survey	·	970 m	MPC · JPL
528152	2008 GE_{149}	—	April 13, 2008	Kitt Peak	Spacewatch	·	1 km	MPC · JPL
528153	2008 GH_{149}	—	April 6, 2008	Kitt Peak	Spacewatch	·	1.3 km	MPC · JPL
528154	2008 GJ_{149}	—	April 6, 2008	Mount Lemmon	Mount Lemmon Survey	EOS	1.9 km	MPC · JPL
528155	2008 GK_{149}	—	April 1, 2008	Mount Lemmon	Mount Lemmon Survey	·	2.1 km	MPC · JPL
528156	2008 GO_{149}	—	April 5, 2008	Mount Lemmon	Mount Lemmon Survey	·	2.9 km	MPC · JPL
528157	2008 GP_{149}	—	January 28, 2007	Mount Lemmon	Mount Lemmon Survey	·	2.6 km	MPC · JPL
528158	2008 HO_{1}	—	March 27, 2008	Kitt Peak	Spacewatch	·	1.0 km	MPC · JPL
528159	2008 HS_{3}	—	April 30, 2008	Catalina	CSS	AMO · PHA	180 m	MPC · JPL
528160	2008 HU_{6}	—	April 9, 2008	Kitt Peak	Spacewatch	·	810 m	MPC · JPL
528161	2008 HF_{7}	—	April 24, 2008	Kitt Peak	Spacewatch	·	2.4 km	MPC · JPL
528162	2008 HK_{7}	—	April 24, 2008	Kitt Peak	Spacewatch	·	2.9 km	MPC · JPL
528163	2008 HU_{11}	—	April 24, 2008	Kitt Peak	Spacewatch	L5	10 km	MPC · JPL
528164	2008 HC_{13}	—	April 5, 2008	Mount Lemmon	Mount Lemmon Survey	·	2.5 km	MPC · JPL
528165	2008 HZ_{19}	—	April 26, 2008	Kitt Peak	Spacewatch	MAR	1.2 km	MPC · JPL
528166	2008 HL_{20}	—	March 31, 2008	Kitt Peak	Spacewatch	·	710 m	MPC · JPL
528167	2008 HF_{22}	—	April 26, 2008	Kitt Peak	Spacewatch	URS	2.9 km	MPC · JPL
528168	2008 HL_{22}	—	April 26, 2008	Kitt Peak	Spacewatch	THB	1.9 km	MPC · JPL
528169	2008 HL_{23}	—	April 27, 2008	Kitt Peak	Spacewatch	·	1.6 km	MPC · JPL
528170	2008 HP_{25}	—	April 27, 2008	Kitt Peak	Spacewatch	VER	2.6 km	MPC · JPL
528171	2008 HC_{27}	—	April 6, 2008	Kitt Peak	Spacewatch	·	1.0 km	MPC · JPL
528172	2008 HP_{27}	—	March 30, 2008	Kitt Peak	Spacewatch	·	1.4 km	MPC · JPL
528173	2008 HS_{28}	—	March 5, 2008	Kitt Peak	Spacewatch	·	750 m	MPC · JPL
528174	2008 HZ_{30}	—	April 14, 2008	Kitt Peak	Spacewatch	PHO	710 m	MPC · JPL
528175	2008 HQ_{31}	—	April 29, 2008	Mount Lemmon	Mount Lemmon Survey	VER	2.3 km	MPC · JPL
528176	2008 HV_{40}	—	April 26, 2008	Mount Lemmon	Mount Lemmon Survey	·	2.3 km	MPC · JPL
528177	2008 HP_{42}	—	March 13, 2008	Kitt Peak	Spacewatch	H	430 m	MPC · JPL
528178	2008 HM_{44}	—	March 30, 2008	Kitt Peak	Spacewatch	·	800 m	MPC · JPL
528179	2008 HC_{47}	—	April 15, 2008	Mount Lemmon	Mount Lemmon Survey	·	1.1 km	MPC · JPL
528180	2008 HH_{47}	—	April 28, 2008	Mount Lemmon	Mount Lemmon Survey	PHO	900 m	MPC · JPL
528181	2008 HR_{50}	—	April 29, 2008	Kitt Peak	Spacewatch	NYS	1.0 km	MPC · JPL
528182	2008 HG_{54}	—	April 29, 2008	Kitt Peak	Spacewatch	·	1.0 km	MPC · JPL
528183	2008 HW_{55}	—	April 29, 2008	Kitt Peak	Spacewatch	·	1.3 km	MPC · JPL
528184	2008 HD_{58}	—	February 28, 2008	Kitt Peak	Spacewatch	·	810 m	MPC · JPL
528185	2008 HD_{60}	—	April 1, 2008	Mount Lemmon	Mount Lemmon Survey	·	2.8 km	MPC · JPL
528186	2008 HK_{60}	—	April 28, 2008	Mount Lemmon	Mount Lemmon Survey	·	2.8 km	MPC · JPL
528187	2008 HP_{62}	—	April 30, 2008	Kitt Peak	Spacewatch	·	2.5 km	MPC · JPL
528188	2008 HR_{62}	—	April 30, 2008	Kitt Peak	Spacewatch	·	2.7 km	MPC · JPL
528189	2008 HR_{63}	—	April 24, 2008	Kitt Peak	Spacewatch	·	2.1 km	MPC · JPL
528190	2008 HE_{68}	—	April 29, 2008	Mount Lemmon	Mount Lemmon Survey	·	2.5 km	MPC · JPL
528191	2008 HA_{70}	—	April 28, 2008	Mount Lemmon	Mount Lemmon Survey	·	2.4 km	MPC · JPL
528192	2008 JM_{1}	—	March 27, 2008	Mount Lemmon	Mount Lemmon Survey	·	980 m	MPC · JPL
528193	2008 JL_{7}	—	March 15, 2008	Mount Lemmon	Mount Lemmon Survey	·	3.0 km	MPC · JPL
528194	2008 JQ_{12}	—	May 3, 2008	Kitt Peak	Spacewatch	·	1.1 km	MPC · JPL
528195	2008 JM_{16}	—	April 3, 2008	Mount Lemmon	Mount Lemmon Survey	·	2.4 km	MPC · JPL
528196	2008 JH_{19}	—	May 7, 2008	Mount Lemmon	Mount Lemmon Survey	·	2.9 km	MPC · JPL
528197	2008 JT_{21}	—	March 27, 2008	Mount Lemmon	Mount Lemmon Survey	·	1.4 km	MPC · JPL
528198	2008 JM_{23}	—	April 29, 2008	Kitt Peak	Spacewatch	·	1.0 km	MPC · JPL
528199	2008 JV_{23}	—	May 7, 2008	Kitt Peak	Spacewatch	·	670 m	MPC · JPL
528200	2008 JW_{23}	—	May 7, 2008	Kitt Peak	Spacewatch	MAS	730 m	MPC · JPL

== 528201–528300 ==
back to top

Designation			Discovery			Properties		Ref
Permanent	Provisional	Named after	Date	Site	Discoverer(s)	Category	Diam.	Ref
528201	2008 JB_{31}	—	March 11, 2008	Catalina	CSS	·	1.3 km	MPC · JPL
528202	2008 JR_{33}	—	May 11, 2008	Mount Lemmon	Mount Lemmon Survey	·	2.6 km	MPC · JPL
528203	2008 JZ_{33}	—	May 13, 2008	Mount Lemmon	Mount Lemmon Survey	·	2.3 km	MPC · JPL
528204	2008 JX_{34}	—	May 7, 2008	Catalina	CSS	·	2.9 km	MPC · JPL
528205	2008 JS_{36}	—	May 5, 2008	Mount Lemmon	Mount Lemmon Survey	·	570 m	MPC · JPL
528206	2008 JG_{40}	—	May 3, 2008	Kitt Peak	Spacewatch	·	2.4 km	MPC · JPL
528207	2008 JQ_{40}	—	May 14, 2008	Mount Lemmon	Mount Lemmon Survey	·	2.7 km	MPC · JPL
528208	2008 JW_{41}	—	May 6, 2008	Mount Lemmon	Mount Lemmon Survey	·	1.6 km	MPC · JPL
528209	2008 KG_{1}	—	May 26, 2008	Kitt Peak	Spacewatch	·	830 m	MPC · JPL
528210	2008 KF_{10}	—	April 7, 2008	Kitt Peak	Spacewatch	L5	7.8 km	MPC · JPL
528211	2008 KY_{16}	—	May 27, 2008	Kitt Peak	Spacewatch	·	2.0 km	MPC · JPL
528212	2008 KN_{17}	—	May 28, 2008	Kitt Peak	Spacewatch	·	1.6 km	MPC · JPL
528213	2008 KK_{28}	—	May 31, 2008	Mount Lemmon	Mount Lemmon Survey	·	1.9 km	MPC · JPL
528214	2008 KJ_{33}	—	May 29, 2008	Mount Lemmon	Mount Lemmon Survey	VER	2.2 km	MPC · JPL
528215	2008 KY_{36}	—	May 29, 2008	Kitt Peak	Spacewatch	L5	8.3 km	MPC · JPL
528216	2008 KK_{39}	—	May 30, 2008	Kitt Peak	Spacewatch	·	3.5 km	MPC · JPL
528217	2008 KP_{39}	—	May 30, 2008	Kitt Peak	Spacewatch	·	1.4 km	MPC · JPL
528218	2008 KR_{39}	—	May 5, 2008	Mount Lemmon	Mount Lemmon Survey	·	2.4 km	MPC · JPL
528219	2008 KV_{42}	—	May 31, 2008	Mauna Kea	Mauna Kea	centaur	101 km	MPC · JPL
528220	2008 KN_{43}	—	April 6, 2008	Kitt Peak	Spacewatch	L5	8.2 km	MPC · JPL
528221	2008 KQ_{43}	—	May 30, 2008	Mount Lemmon	Mount Lemmon Survey	MAR	900 m	MPC · JPL
528222	2008 LO_{2}	—	March 29, 2008	Kitt Peak	Spacewatch	·	1.0 km	MPC · JPL
528223	2008 LW_{6}	—	May 13, 2008	Mount Lemmon	Mount Lemmon Survey	EUN	1.1 km	MPC · JPL
528224	2008 LB_{10}	—	June 6, 2008	Kitt Peak	Spacewatch	·	3.1 km	MPC · JPL
528225	2008 LF_{15}	—	May 5, 2008	Mount Lemmon	Mount Lemmon Survey	LUT	3.4 km	MPC · JPL
528226	2008 MT_{3}	—	June 30, 2008	Kitt Peak	Spacewatch	·	1.3 km	MPC · JPL
528227	2008 MP_{4}	—	June 30, 2008	Kitt Peak	Spacewatch	·	1.0 km	MPC · JPL
528228	2008 NC_{2}	—	August 9, 2004	Anderson Mesa	LONEOS	·	1.4 km	MPC · JPL
528229	2008 OQ_{12}	—	July 29, 2008	Mount Lemmon	Mount Lemmon Survey	·	1.6 km	MPC · JPL
528230	2008 OX_{21}	—	July 30, 2008	Kitt Peak	Spacewatch	·	1.5 km	MPC · JPL
528231	2008 OL_{22}	—	July 28, 2008	Catalina	CSS	·	790 m	MPC · JPL
528232	2008 PX_{3}	—	July 31, 2008	Mount Lemmon	Mount Lemmon Survey	·	2.4 km	MPC · JPL
528233	2008 PG_{12}	—	July 29, 2008	Catalina	CSS	·	1.9 km	MPC · JPL
528234	2008 QB_{8}	—	August 20, 2008	Kitt Peak	Spacewatch	·	1.1 km	MPC · JPL
528235	2008 QA_{21}	—	August 26, 2008	Socorro	LINEAR	·	700 m	MPC · JPL
528236	2008 QK_{29}	—	August 23, 2008	La Sagra	OAM	·	2.4 km	MPC · JPL
528237	2008 QS_{34}	—	August 4, 2008	Siding Spring	SSS	·	1.3 km	MPC · JPL
528238	2008 QO_{41}	—	August 21, 2008	Kitt Peak	Spacewatch	GEF	1.4 km	MPC · JPL
528239	2008 QR_{47}	—	August 24, 2008	Kitt Peak	Spacewatch	·	1.6 km	MPC · JPL
528240	2008 RM_{3}	—	September 2, 2008	Kitt Peak	Spacewatch	·	520 m	MPC · JPL
528241	2008 RF_{10}	—	September 3, 2008	Kitt Peak	Spacewatch	·	1.5 km	MPC · JPL
528242	2008 RG_{10}	—	September 3, 2008	Kitt Peak	Spacewatch	KOR	1.1 km	MPC · JPL
528243	2008 RP_{14}	—	August 24, 2008	Kitt Peak	Spacewatch	·	1.5 km	MPC · JPL
528244	2008 RM_{18}	—	August 24, 2008	Socorro	LINEAR	·	1.8 km	MPC · JPL
528245	2008 RU_{19}	—	August 24, 2008	Kitt Peak	Spacewatch	·	1.4 km	MPC · JPL
528246	2008 RO_{36}	—	September 2, 2008	Kitt Peak	Spacewatch	AGN	1.0 km	MPC · JPL
528247	2008 RB_{38}	—	September 2, 2008	Kitt Peak	Spacewatch	·	1.0 km	MPC · JPL
528248	2008 RK_{40}	—	September 2, 2008	Kitt Peak	Spacewatch	·	1.1 km	MPC · JPL
528249	2008 RC_{46}	—	September 2, 2008	Kitt Peak	Spacewatch	·	1.7 km	MPC · JPL
528250	2008 RK_{47}	—	August 19, 2008	Siding Spring	SSS	·	1.4 km	MPC · JPL
528251	2008 RN_{56}	—	September 3, 2008	Kitt Peak	Spacewatch	·	1.5 km	MPC · JPL
528252	2008 RA_{75}	—	August 21, 2008	Kitt Peak	Spacewatch	·	620 m	MPC · JPL
528253	2008 RX_{85}	—	September 5, 2008	Kitt Peak	Spacewatch	GEF	680 m	MPC · JPL
528254	2008 RL_{89}	—	September 5, 2008	Kitt Peak	Spacewatch	·	1.4 km	MPC · JPL
528255	2008 RC_{100}	—	September 2, 2008	Kitt Peak	Spacewatch	·	610 m	MPC · JPL
528256	2008 RC_{102}	—	September 3, 2008	Kitt Peak	Spacewatch	·	1.3 km	MPC · JPL
528257	2008 RC_{103}	—	September 5, 2008	Kitt Peak	Spacewatch	·	1.3 km	MPC · JPL
528258	2008 RR_{103}	—	September 5, 2008	Kitt Peak	Spacewatch	·	2.0 km	MPC · JPL
528259	2008 RO_{104}	—	September 6, 2008	Mount Lemmon	Mount Lemmon Survey	·	1.9 km	MPC · JPL
528260	2008 RJ_{106}	—	September 7, 2008	Mount Lemmon	Mount Lemmon Survey	·	2.0 km	MPC · JPL
528261	2008 RF_{109}	—	September 2, 2008	Kitt Peak	Spacewatch	·	1.3 km	MPC · JPL
528262	2008 RO_{109}	—	September 2, 2008	Kitt Peak	Spacewatch	KOR	1.1 km	MPC · JPL
528263	2008 RR_{112}	—	September 5, 2008	Kitt Peak	Spacewatch	·	1.7 km	MPC · JPL
528264	2008 RL_{114}	—	September 6, 2008	Mount Lemmon	Mount Lemmon Survey	·	1.8 km	MPC · JPL
528265	2008 RS_{123}	—	September 6, 2008	Kitt Peak	Spacewatch	KOR	1.2 km	MPC · JPL
528266	2008 RX_{124}	—	September 6, 2008	Kitt Peak	Spacewatch	MAR	710 m	MPC · JPL
528267	2008 RG_{126}	—	September 10, 2008	Kitt Peak	Spacewatch	·	1.5 km	MPC · JPL
528268	2008 RZ_{136}	—	September 4, 2008	Kitt Peak	Spacewatch	·	1.4 km	MPC · JPL
528269	2008 RC_{139}	—	September 7, 2008	Mount Lemmon	Mount Lemmon Survey	EUN	1.0 km	MPC · JPL
528270	2008 RQ_{141}	—	June 14, 2007	Kitt Peak	Spacewatch	·	2.2 km	MPC · JPL
528271	2008 RZ_{141}	—	September 4, 2008	Socorro	LINEAR	·	630 m	MPC · JPL
528272	2008 RN_{145}	—	September 4, 2008	Kitt Peak	Spacewatch	·	1.7 km	MPC · JPL
528273	2008 RA_{146}	—	September 4, 2008	Kitt Peak	Spacewatch	·	1.6 km	MPC · JPL
528274	2008 RZ_{147}	—	September 4, 2008	Kitt Peak	Spacewatch	AGN	920 m	MPC · JPL
528275	2008 RF_{148}	—	September 3, 2008	Kitt Peak	Spacewatch	·	1.5 km	MPC · JPL
528276	2008 RO_{148}	—	September 5, 2008	Kitt Peak	Spacewatch	·	1.4 km	MPC · JPL
528277	2008 RR_{148}	—	September 5, 2008	Kitt Peak	Spacewatch	·	1.9 km	MPC · JPL
528278	2008 RV_{148}	—	September 1, 2008	Siding Spring	SSS	JUN	1.2 km	MPC · JPL
528279	2008 RB_{149}	—	September 9, 2008	Mount Lemmon	Mount Lemmon Survey	·	1.2 km	MPC · JPL
528280	2008 RE_{149}	—	September 5, 2008	Kitt Peak	Spacewatch	·	630 m	MPC · JPL
528281	2008 RG_{149}	—	September 14, 1998	Socorro	LINEAR	·	810 m	MPC · JPL
528282	2008 SY	—	January 26, 2006	Mount Lemmon	Mount Lemmon Survey	·	1.8 km	MPC · JPL
528283	2008 SZ_{8}	—	September 5, 2008	Kitt Peak	Spacewatch	·	1.6 km	MPC · JPL
528284	2008 SW_{11}	—	September 25, 2008	Kitt Peak	Spacewatch	APO	210 m	MPC · JPL
528285	2008 SD_{16}	—	September 7, 2008	Mount Lemmon	Mount Lemmon Survey	·	1.2 km	MPC · JPL
528286	2008 SW_{20}	—	September 19, 2008	Kitt Peak	Spacewatch	·	1.1 km	MPC · JPL
528287	2008 SD_{27}	—	August 24, 2008	Kitt Peak	Spacewatch	AEO	990 m	MPC · JPL
528288	2008 SC_{30}	—	September 19, 2008	Kitt Peak	Spacewatch	DOR	1.9 km	MPC · JPL
528289	2008 SJ_{40}	—	September 20, 2008	Kitt Peak	Spacewatch	·	630 m	MPC · JPL
528290	2008 SM_{40}	—	September 20, 2008	Kitt Peak	Spacewatch	·	2.0 km	MPC · JPL
528291	2008 SL_{44}	—	September 9, 2008	Mount Lemmon	Mount Lemmon Survey	·	620 m	MPC · JPL
528292	2008 SJ_{46}	—	September 20, 2008	Kitt Peak	Spacewatch	·	2.3 km	MPC · JPL
528293	2008 SV_{49}	—	August 23, 2008	Kitt Peak	Spacewatch	·	560 m	MPC · JPL
528294	2008 SQ_{51}	—	September 4, 2008	Kitt Peak	Spacewatch	HOF	2.0 km	MPC · JPL
528295	2008 SY_{51}	—	September 20, 2008	Mount Lemmon	Mount Lemmon Survey	·	540 m	MPC · JPL
528296	2008 SV_{54}	—	September 20, 2008	Mount Lemmon	Mount Lemmon Survey	HNS	840 m	MPC · JPL
528297	2008 SQ_{57}	—	September 20, 2008	Kitt Peak	Spacewatch	·	550 m	MPC · JPL
528298	2008 SQ_{66}	—	September 3, 2008	Kitt Peak	Spacewatch	·	1.7 km	MPC · JPL
528299	2008 SD_{72}	—	September 22, 2008	Catalina	CSS	·	1.9 km	MPC · JPL
528300	2008 SY_{73}	—	September 23, 2008	Kitt Peak	Spacewatch	AGN	950 m	MPC · JPL

== 528301–528400 ==
back to top

Designation			Discovery			Properties		Ref
Permanent	Provisional	Named after	Date	Site	Discoverer(s)	Category	Diam.	Ref
528301	2008 SF_{77}	—	August 24, 2008	Kitt Peak	Spacewatch	AEO	1.0 km	MPC · JPL
528302	2008 SM_{77}	—	August 24, 2008	Kitt Peak	Spacewatch	·	1.6 km	MPC · JPL
528303	2008 SW_{83}	—	September 27, 2008	Mount Lemmon	Mount Lemmon Survey	·	1.5 km	MPC · JPL
528304	2008 SY_{84}	—	September 4, 2008	Kitt Peak	Spacewatch	·	780 m	MPC · JPL
528305	2008 SY_{92}	—	September 21, 2008	Kitt Peak	Spacewatch	·	1.9 km	MPC · JPL
528306	2008 SG_{97}	—	September 21, 2008	Kitt Peak	Spacewatch	·	650 m	MPC · JPL
528307	2008 SK_{100}	—	September 5, 2008	La Sagra	OAM	·	720 m	MPC · JPL
528308	2008 ST_{105}	—	September 21, 2008	Kitt Peak	Spacewatch	·	580 m	MPC · JPL
528309	2008 SJ_{107}	—	September 9, 2008	Kitt Peak	Spacewatch	DOR	2.0 km	MPC · JPL
528310	2008 SZ_{109}	—	September 22, 2008	Kitt Peak	Spacewatch	·	1.3 km	MPC · JPL
528311	2008 SK_{114}	—	September 22, 2008	Kitt Peak	Spacewatch	·	1.2 km	MPC · JPL
528312	2008 SJ_{117}	—	September 22, 2008	Mount Lemmon	Mount Lemmon Survey	·	1.3 km	MPC · JPL
528313	2008 SN_{118}	—	September 22, 2008	Mount Lemmon	Mount Lemmon Survey	·	1.6 km	MPC · JPL
528314	2008 SO_{119}	—	September 22, 2008	Mount Lemmon	Mount Lemmon Survey	·	1.2 km	MPC · JPL
528315	2008 SY_{121}	—	September 22, 2008	Mount Lemmon	Mount Lemmon Survey	·	1.5 km	MPC · JPL
528316	2008 SX_{123}	—	September 6, 2008	Mount Lemmon	Mount Lemmon Survey	·	530 m	MPC · JPL
528317	2008 SX_{125}	—	September 22, 2008	Mount Lemmon	Mount Lemmon Survey	·	1.4 km	MPC · JPL
528318	2008 SB_{126}	—	September 22, 2008	Mount Lemmon	Mount Lemmon Survey	·	1.5 km	MPC · JPL
528319	2008 SQ_{126}	—	September 22, 2008	Kitt Peak	Spacewatch	·	1.7 km	MPC · JPL
528320	2008 ST_{130}	—	September 22, 2008	Kitt Peak	Spacewatch	·	1.7 km	MPC · JPL
528321	2008 SJ_{133}	—	September 22, 2008	Kitt Peak	Spacewatch	·	1.4 km	MPC · JPL
528322	2008 SX_{133}	—	July 30, 2008	Kitt Peak	Spacewatch	·	1.3 km	MPC · JPL
528323	2008 SE_{136}	—	September 23, 2008	Kitt Peak	Spacewatch	·	1.6 km	MPC · JPL
528324	2008 SK_{136}	—	September 23, 2008	Kitt Peak	Spacewatch	·	610 m	MPC · JPL
528325	2008 SR_{140}	—	September 24, 2008	Mount Lemmon	Mount Lemmon Survey	TRE	3.4 km	MPC · JPL
528326	2008 SR_{141}	—	September 24, 2008	Kitt Peak	Spacewatch	·	1.7 km	MPC · JPL
528327	2008 SQ_{145}	—	September 2, 2008	Kitt Peak	Spacewatch	·	1.5 km	MPC · JPL
528328	2008 SF_{150}	—	November 28, 2013	Kitt Peak	Spacewatch	·	1.7 km	MPC · JPL
528329	2008 SU_{161}	—	September 28, 2008	Socorro	LINEAR	·	630 m	MPC · JPL
528330	2008 SQ_{180}	—	September 24, 2008	Kitt Peak	Spacewatch	·	1.4 km	MPC · JPL
528331	2008 SD_{182}	—	September 24, 2008	Mount Lemmon	Mount Lemmon Survey	·	1.7 km	MPC · JPL
528332	2008 SM_{182}	—	September 24, 2008	Kitt Peak	Spacewatch	·	660 m	MPC · JPL
528333	2008 SY_{183}	—	September 24, 2008	Kitt Peak	Spacewatch	·	1.2 km	MPC · JPL
528334	2008 SC_{184}	—	September 20, 2008	Kitt Peak	Spacewatch	·	500 m	MPC · JPL
528335	2008 SV_{184}	—	September 24, 2008	Kitt Peak	Spacewatch	·	1.9 km	MPC · JPL
528336	2008 SS_{186}	—	September 25, 2008	Kitt Peak	Spacewatch	·	770 m	MPC · JPL
528337	2008 SW_{186}	—	September 25, 2008	Kitt Peak	Spacewatch	·	1.3 km	MPC · JPL
528338	2008 SW_{191}	—	September 25, 2008	Kitt Peak	Spacewatch	·	1.9 km	MPC · JPL
528339	2008 SQ_{192}	—	September 25, 2008	Kitt Peak	Spacewatch	·	1.3 km	MPC · JPL
528340	2008 SQ_{196}	—	September 25, 2008	Kitt Peak	Spacewatch	·	1.5 km	MPC · JPL
528341	2008 SA_{206}	—	September 26, 2008	Kitt Peak	Spacewatch	·	640 m	MPC · JPL
528342	2008 SM_{216}	—	September 29, 2008	Mount Lemmon	Mount Lemmon Survey	·	2.2 km	MPC · JPL
528343	2008 SC_{219}	—	September 20, 2008	Catalina	CSS	EUN	1.1 km	MPC · JPL
528344	2008 SM_{219}	—	October 7, 2008	Kitt Peak	Spacewatch	·	1.1 km	MPC · JPL
528345	2008 SV_{219}	—	September 2, 2008	Kitt Peak	Spacewatch	·	1.3 km	MPC · JPL
528346	2008 SB_{221}	—	September 25, 2008	Kitt Peak	Spacewatch	·	1.2 km	MPC · JPL
528347	2008 SV_{221}	—	September 3, 2008	Kitt Peak	Spacewatch	·	1.4 km	MPC · JPL
528348	2008 SP_{228}	—	September 5, 2008	Kitt Peak	Spacewatch	·	1.6 km	MPC · JPL
528349	2008 SM_{229}	—	September 5, 2008	Kitt Peak	Spacewatch	WIT	890 m	MPC · JPL
528350	2008 SZ_{230}	—	August 24, 2008	Kitt Peak	Spacewatch	·	1.6 km	MPC · JPL
528351	2008 SX_{235}	—	September 28, 2008	Mount Lemmon	Mount Lemmon Survey	·	550 m	MPC · JPL
528352	2008 SG_{236}	—	September 25, 2008	Kitt Peak	Spacewatch	·	1.6 km	MPC · JPL
528353	2008 SJ_{237}	—	September 29, 2008	Mount Lemmon	Mount Lemmon Survey	·	400 m	MPC · JPL
528354	2008 ST_{237}	—	September 6, 2008	Mount Lemmon	Mount Lemmon Survey	DOR	2.1 km	MPC · JPL
528355	2008 SK_{240}	—	September 29, 2008	Kitt Peak	Spacewatch	·	1.3 km	MPC · JPL
528356	2008 SM_{244}	—	September 27, 2008	Mount Lemmon	Mount Lemmon Survey	·	2.0 km	MPC · JPL
528357	2008 SY_{247}	—	September 20, 2008	Kitt Peak	Spacewatch	·	1.3 km	MPC · JPL
528358	2008 ST_{248}	—	September 21, 2008	Kitt Peak	Spacewatch	AGN	1.1 km	MPC · JPL
528359	2008 SU_{248}	—	September 21, 2008	Kitt Peak	Spacewatch	·	600 m	MPC · JPL
528360	2008 SF_{251}	—	September 24, 2008	Kitt Peak	Spacewatch	·	560 m	MPC · JPL
528361	2008 SQ_{251}	—	September 26, 2008	Kitt Peak	Spacewatch	·	1.4 km	MPC · JPL
528362	2008 SY_{254}	—	September 23, 2008	Mount Lemmon	Mount Lemmon Survey	·	1.4 km	MPC · JPL
528363	2008 SW_{255}	—	September 19, 2008	Kitt Peak	Spacewatch	NEM	1.6 km	MPC · JPL
528364	2008 SH_{259}	—	September 23, 2008	Catalina	CSS	·	1.9 km	MPC · JPL
528365	2008 SN_{259}	—	September 23, 2008	Mount Lemmon	Mount Lemmon Survey	KOR	950 m	MPC · JPL
528366	2008 SP_{263}	—	September 24, 2008	Kitt Peak	Spacewatch	KOR	1.1 km	MPC · JPL
528367	2008 SF_{268}	—	September 24, 2008	Mount Lemmon	Mount Lemmon Survey	·	1.9 km	MPC · JPL
528368	2008 SZ_{268}	—	September 30, 2008	Catalina	CSS	·	1.6 km	MPC · JPL
528369	2008 SL_{270}	—	September 24, 2008	Kitt Peak	Spacewatch	·	1.7 km	MPC · JPL
528370	2008 SM_{273}	—	September 25, 2008	Mount Lemmon	Mount Lemmon Survey	·	1.5 km	MPC · JPL
528371	2008 SO_{274}	—	September 20, 2008	Mount Lemmon	Mount Lemmon Survey	KOR	1.0 km	MPC · JPL
528372	2008 SE_{278}	—	September 28, 2008	Mount Lemmon	Mount Lemmon Survey	·	1.3 km	MPC · JPL
528373	2008 SR_{278}	—	September 23, 2008	Mount Lemmon	Mount Lemmon Survey	·	1.3 km	MPC · JPL
528374	2008 SY_{278}	—	September 26, 2008	Kitt Peak	Spacewatch	AGN	900 m	MPC · JPL
528375	2008 SQ_{279}	—	September 2, 2008	Kitt Peak	Spacewatch	KOR	1.1 km	MPC · JPL
528376	2008 SZ_{280}	—	September 23, 2008	Mount Lemmon	Mount Lemmon Survey	·	1.3 km	MPC · JPL
528377	2008 SX_{283}	—	September 23, 2008	Kitt Peak	Spacewatch	·	1.5 km	MPC · JPL
528378	2008 SZ_{284}	—	September 27, 2008	Mount Lemmon	Mount Lemmon Survey	·	660 m	MPC · JPL
528379	2008 SC_{288}	—	September 23, 2008	Kitt Peak	Spacewatch	·	1.5 km	MPC · JPL
528380	2008 SL_{290}	—	September 29, 2008	Catalina	CSS	·	690 m	MPC · JPL
528381	2008 ST_{291}	—	September 24, 2008	Palomar	M. E. Schwamb, M. E. Brown, D. L. Rabinowitz	res · 1:6	536 km	MPC · JPL
528382	2008 SX_{294}	—	September 22, 2008	Catalina	CSS	·	1.5 km	MPC · JPL
528383	2008 SF_{295}	—	September 23, 2008	Catalina	CSS	(194)	1.2 km	MPC · JPL
528384	2008 SO_{297}	—	September 26, 2008	Kitt Peak	Spacewatch	·	1.9 km	MPC · JPL
528385	2008 SE_{299}	—	September 22, 2008	Socorro	LINEAR	·	2.2 km	MPC · JPL
528386	2008 SJ_{299}	—	September 22, 2008	Kitt Peak	Spacewatch	·	1.8 km	MPC · JPL
528387	2008 SY_{303}	—	September 24, 2008	Kitt Peak	Spacewatch	·	1.4 km	MPC · JPL
528388	2008 SL_{306}	—	September 28, 2008	Mount Lemmon	Mount Lemmon Survey	·	1.8 km	MPC · JPL
528389	2008 SN_{307}	—	September 29, 2008	Catalina	CSS	·	690 m	MPC · JPL
528390	2008 SD_{308}	—	September 29, 2008	Kitt Peak	Spacewatch	·	2.0 km	MPC · JPL
528391	2008 SL_{308}	—	September 30, 2008	Catalina	CSS	BAR	1.3 km	MPC · JPL
528392	2008 SC_{312}	—	September 23, 2008	Mount Lemmon	Mount Lemmon Survey	·	1.5 km	MPC · JPL
528393	2008 SP_{312}	—	October 5, 2013	Haleakala	Pan-STARRS 1	·	1.7 km	MPC · JPL
528394	2008 SX_{312}	—	September 23, 2008	Kitt Peak	Spacewatch	·	1.5 km	MPC · JPL
528395	2008 SO_{313}	—	October 25, 2005	Mount Lemmon	Mount Lemmon Survey	·	560 m	MPC · JPL
528396	2008 SP_{313}	—	September 23, 2008	Mount Lemmon	Mount Lemmon Survey	·	440 m	MPC · JPL
528397	2008 SZ_{313}	—	September 24, 2008	Mount Lemmon	Mount Lemmon Survey	·	1.7 km	MPC · JPL
528398	2008 TS_{4}	—	September 2, 2008	Kitt Peak	Spacewatch	·	1.6 km	MPC · JPL
528399	2008 TY_{15}	—	September 21, 2008	Kitt Peak	Spacewatch	·	1.4 km	MPC · JPL
528400	2008 TQ_{19}	—	October 1, 2008	Mount Lemmon	Mount Lemmon Survey	·	1.3 km	MPC · JPL

== 528401–528500 ==
back to top

Designation			Discovery			Properties		Ref
Permanent	Provisional	Named after	Date	Site	Discoverer(s)	Category	Diam.	Ref
528401	2008 TQ_{25}	—	September 24, 2008	Kitt Peak	Spacewatch	·	1.4 km	MPC · JPL
528402	2008 TQ_{30}	—	October 1, 2008	Kitt Peak	Spacewatch	·	1.7 km	MPC · JPL
528403	2008 TF_{40}	—	December 13, 2004	Kitt Peak	Spacewatch	(32418)	1.6 km	MPC · JPL
528404	2008 TU_{51}	—	September 24, 2008	Kitt Peak	Spacewatch	·	850 m	MPC · JPL
528405	2008 TG_{52}	—	December 19, 2004	Mount Lemmon	Mount Lemmon Survey	DOR	1.9 km	MPC · JPL
528406	2008 TK_{52}	—	September 6, 2008	Mount Lemmon	Mount Lemmon Survey	·	1.4 km	MPC · JPL
528407	2008 TO_{52}	—	September 20, 2008	Kitt Peak	Spacewatch	·	1.6 km	MPC · JPL
528408	2008 TM_{62}	—	October 2, 2008	Kitt Peak	Spacewatch	·	1.1 km	MPC · JPL
528409	2008 TV_{62}	—	September 26, 2008	Kitt Peak	Spacewatch	TRE	1.7 km	MPC · JPL
528410	2008 TL_{65}	—	September 9, 2008	Kitt Peak	Spacewatch	·	590 m	MPC · JPL
528411	2008 TX_{65}	—	September 24, 2008	Kitt Peak	Spacewatch	·	1.5 km	MPC · JPL
528412	2008 TR_{67}	—	September 23, 2008	Kitt Peak	Spacewatch	·	550 m	MPC · JPL
528413	2008 TW_{67}	—	September 23, 2008	Kitt Peak	Spacewatch	·	590 m	MPC · JPL
528414	2008 TO_{69}	—	September 23, 2008	Kitt Peak	Spacewatch	·	480 m	MPC · JPL
528415	2008 TB_{71}	—	October 2, 2008	Kitt Peak	Spacewatch	·	630 m	MPC · JPL
528416	2008 TP_{79}	—	September 22, 2008	Mount Lemmon	Mount Lemmon Survey	·	2.0 km	MPC · JPL
528417	2008 TV_{79}	—	October 2, 2008	Mount Lemmon	Mount Lemmon Survey	·	360 m	MPC · JPL
528418	2008 TQ_{80}	—	October 2, 2008	Mount Lemmon	Mount Lemmon Survey	·	1.6 km	MPC · JPL
528419	2008 TO_{81}	—	September 20, 2008	Mount Lemmon	Mount Lemmon Survey	KOR	1.1 km	MPC · JPL
528420	2008 TE_{83}	—	October 3, 2008	Kitt Peak	Spacewatch	·	500 m	MPC · JPL
528421	2008 TW_{84}	—	September 20, 2008	Kitt Peak	Spacewatch	·	740 m	MPC · JPL
528422	2008 TG_{85}	—	October 3, 2008	Mount Lemmon	Mount Lemmon Survey	·	1.6 km	MPC · JPL
528423	2008 TQ_{90}	—	September 25, 2008	Kitt Peak	Spacewatch	·	1.1 km	MPC · JPL
528424	2008 TP_{91}	—	September 23, 2008	Catalina	CSS	·	2.2 km	MPC · JPL
528425	2008 TG_{94}	—	October 8, 2008	Kitt Peak	Spacewatch	·	1.7 km	MPC · JPL
528426	2008 TA_{96}	—	October 6, 2008	Kitt Peak	Spacewatch	·	550 m	MPC · JPL
528427	2008 TD_{96}	—	October 6, 2008	Kitt Peak	Spacewatch	·	1.7 km	MPC · JPL
528428	2008 TW_{96}	—	October 6, 2008	Kitt Peak	Spacewatch	·	1.5 km	MPC · JPL
528429	2008 TT_{100}	—	September 7, 2008	Mount Lemmon	Mount Lemmon Survey	·	1.3 km	MPC · JPL
528430	2008 TE_{102}	—	October 6, 2008	Kitt Peak	Spacewatch	·	1.7 km	MPC · JPL
528431	2008 TA_{107}	—	September 23, 2008	Mount Lemmon	Mount Lemmon Survey	KOR	1.3 km	MPC · JPL
528432	2008 TR_{107}	—	October 6, 2008	Mount Lemmon	Mount Lemmon Survey	·	1.6 km	MPC · JPL
528433	2008 TT_{108}	—	October 6, 2008	Mount Lemmon	Mount Lemmon Survey	·	1.5 km	MPC · JPL
528434	2008 TC_{112}	—	December 2, 2005	Mount Lemmon	Mount Lemmon Survey	·	790 m	MPC · JPL
528435	2008 TH_{115}	—	September 23, 2008	Catalina	CSS	·	550 m	MPC · JPL
528436	2008 TQ_{116}	—	October 1, 2008	Mount Lemmon	Mount Lemmon Survey	·	600 m	MPC · JPL
528437	2008 TU_{116}	—	October 6, 2008	Catalina	CSS	·	1.6 km	MPC · JPL
528438	2008 TX_{124}	—	September 23, 2008	Kitt Peak	Spacewatch	·	560 m	MPC · JPL
528439	2008 TR_{125}	—	September 23, 2008	Kitt Peak	Spacewatch	·	1.4 km	MPC · JPL
528440	2008 TV_{128}	—	September 24, 2008	Mount Lemmon	Mount Lemmon Survey	·	1.0 km	MPC · JPL
528441	2008 TS_{131}	—	October 8, 2008	Mount Lemmon	Mount Lemmon Survey	·	1.6 km	MPC · JPL
528442	2008 TF_{132}	—	September 23, 2008	Kitt Peak	Spacewatch	·	1.8 km	MPC · JPL
528443	2008 TD_{133}	—	September 23, 2008	Kitt Peak	Spacewatch	·	1.7 km	MPC · JPL
528444	2008 TB_{134}	—	October 1, 2008	Mount Lemmon	Mount Lemmon Survey	·	1.0 km	MPC · JPL
528445	2008 TR_{135}	—	October 1, 2008	Kitt Peak	Spacewatch	·	1.6 km	MPC · JPL
528446	2008 TA_{136}	—	October 8, 2008	Kitt Peak	Spacewatch	·	1.5 km	MPC · JPL
528447	2008 TX_{141}	—	September 2, 2008	Kitt Peak	Spacewatch	KOR	1.2 km	MPC · JPL
528448	2008 TP_{143}	—	October 9, 2008	Mount Lemmon	Mount Lemmon Survey	KOR	1.2 km	MPC · JPL
528449	2008 TJ_{148}	—	October 9, 2008	Mount Lemmon	Mount Lemmon Survey	·	1.1 km	MPC · JPL
528450	2008 TX_{151}	—	September 3, 2008	Kitt Peak	Spacewatch	·	1.6 km	MPC · JPL
528451	2008 TV_{158}	—	September 25, 2008	Mount Lemmon	Mount Lemmon Survey	MRX	970 m	MPC · JPL
528452	2008 TR_{160}	—	October 2, 2008	Kitt Peak	Spacewatch	HNS	840 m	MPC · JPL
528453	2008 TM_{163}	—	October 1, 2008	Kitt Peak	Spacewatch	·	1.2 km	MPC · JPL
528454	2008 TO_{163}	—	October 1, 2008	Kitt Peak	Spacewatch	AGN	970 m	MPC · JPL
528455	2008 TE_{164}	—	October 1, 2008	Mount Lemmon	Mount Lemmon Survey	·	580 m	MPC · JPL
528456	2008 TV_{166}	—	October 8, 2008	Mount Lemmon	Mount Lemmon Survey	·	1.6 km	MPC · JPL
528457	2008 TO_{167}	—	October 9, 2008	Mount Lemmon	Mount Lemmon Survey	·	720 m	MPC · JPL
528458	2008 TP_{170}	—	October 9, 2008	Kitt Peak	Spacewatch	AGN	870 m	MPC · JPL
528459	2008 TQ_{172}	—	October 6, 2008	Kitt Peak	Spacewatch	·	2.4 km	MPC · JPL
528460	2008 TY_{173}	—	October 2, 2008	Kitt Peak	Spacewatch	·	1.2 km	MPC · JPL
528461	2008 TZ_{173}	—	October 2, 2008	Kitt Peak	Spacewatch	WIT	700 m	MPC · JPL
528462	2008 TU_{176}	—	October 1, 2008	Catalina	CSS	·	2.1 km	MPC · JPL
528463	2008 TW_{180}	—	October 6, 2008	Catalina	CSS	·	590 m	MPC · JPL
528464	2008 TM_{181}	—	October 1, 2008	Mount Lemmon	Mount Lemmon Survey	BRA	1.2 km	MPC · JPL
528465	2008 TT_{186}	—	October 8, 2008	Kitt Peak	Spacewatch	·	1.3 km	MPC · JPL
528466	2008 TQ_{189}	—	October 3, 2008	Mount Lemmon	Mount Lemmon Survey	·	670 m	MPC · JPL
528467	2008 TT_{189}	—	October 10, 2008	Socorro	LINEAR	·	2.2 km	MPC · JPL
528468	2008 TR_{191}	—	January 4, 2010	Kitt Peak	Spacewatch	3:2	4.3 km	MPC · JPL
528469	2008 TC_{192}	—	October 10, 2008	Mount Lemmon	Mount Lemmon Survey	·	1.9 km	MPC · JPL
528470	2008 TH_{193}	—	October 7, 2008	Mount Lemmon	Mount Lemmon Survey	·	1.3 km	MPC · JPL
528471	2008 TM_{193}	—	October 9, 2008	Mount Lemmon	Mount Lemmon Survey	·	1.5 km	MPC · JPL
528472	2008 TO_{193}	—	October 10, 2008	Mount Lemmon	Mount Lemmon Survey	·	2.2 km	MPC · JPL
528473	2008 UJ	—	October 6, 2008	Mount Lemmon	Mount Lemmon Survey	·	520 m	MPC · JPL
528474	2008 UN_{2}	—	September 22, 2008	Catalina	CSS	·	2.0 km	MPC · JPL
528475	2008 UV_{2}	—	October 1, 2008	Catalina	CSS	BAR	1.0 km	MPC · JPL
528476	2008 UD_{4}	—	September 29, 2008	Catalina	CSS	·	580 m	MPC · JPL
528477	2008 UT_{12}	—	September 4, 2008	Kitt Peak	Spacewatch	(13314)	1.4 km	MPC · JPL
528478	2008 UB_{13}	—	September 4, 2008	Kitt Peak	Spacewatch	·	1.6 km	MPC · JPL
528479	2008 UG_{26}	—	October 2, 2008	Kitt Peak	Spacewatch	·	990 m	MPC · JPL
528480	2008 UA_{27}	—	October 20, 2008	Kitt Peak	Spacewatch	KOR	1.1 km	MPC · JPL
528481	2008 UN_{28}	—	October 20, 2008	Kitt Peak	Spacewatch	·	610 m	MPC · JPL
528482	2008 US_{32}	—	October 6, 2008	Mount Lemmon	Mount Lemmon Survey	HOF	2.2 km	MPC · JPL
528483	2008 UE_{35}	—	September 22, 2008	Mount Lemmon	Mount Lemmon Survey	·	570 m	MPC · JPL
528484	2008 UO_{38}	—	October 20, 2008	Kitt Peak	Spacewatch	·	1.5 km	MPC · JPL
528485	2008 UY_{44}	—	September 25, 2008	Kitt Peak	Spacewatch	·	1.4 km	MPC · JPL
528486	2008 UJ_{45}	—	October 8, 2008	Kitt Peak	Spacewatch	AGN	950 m	MPC · JPL
528487	2008 UC_{51}	—	October 20, 2008	Kitt Peak	Spacewatch	HOF	2.1 km	MPC · JPL
528488	2008 UC_{53}	—	October 20, 2008	Mount Lemmon	Mount Lemmon Survey	·	1.5 km	MPC · JPL
528489 Ntuef	2008 UW_{54}	Ntuef	October 20, 2008	Lulin	X. Y. Hsiao, Q. Ye	·	590 m	MPC · JPL
528490	2008 UW_{55}	—	October 3, 2008	Kitt Peak	Spacewatch	·	1.6 km	MPC · JPL
528491	2008 UT_{59}	—	October 1, 2008	Mount Lemmon	Mount Lemmon Survey	·	1.8 km	MPC · JPL
528492	2008 UM_{60}	—	September 28, 2008	Mount Lemmon	Mount Lemmon Survey	·	640 m	MPC · JPL
528493	2008 UO_{60}	—	October 9, 2008	Kitt Peak	Spacewatch	·	570 m	MPC · JPL
528494	2008 UZ_{68}	—	October 6, 2008	Mount Lemmon	Mount Lemmon Survey	·	1.5 km	MPC · JPL
528495	2008 UT_{70}	—	September 6, 2008	Mount Lemmon	Mount Lemmon Survey	·	520 m	MPC · JPL
528496	2008 UU_{71}	—	October 21, 2008	Mount Lemmon	Mount Lemmon Survey	·	2.1 km	MPC · JPL
528497	2008 UE_{72}	—	October 21, 2008	Kitt Peak	Spacewatch	·	820 m	MPC · JPL
528498	2008 UO_{72}	—	October 21, 2008	Mount Lemmon	Mount Lemmon Survey	·	1.9 km	MPC · JPL
528499	2008 UU_{73}	—	October 21, 2008	Kitt Peak	Spacewatch	·	1.7 km	MPC · JPL
528500	2008 UM_{78}	—	October 1, 2008	Kitt Peak	Spacewatch	·	1.6 km	MPC · JPL

== 528501–528600 ==
back to top

Designation			Discovery			Properties		Ref
Permanent	Provisional	Named after	Date	Site	Discoverer(s)	Category	Diam.	Ref
528501	2008 UX_{79}	—	October 9, 2008	Kitt Peak	Spacewatch	·	1.2 km	MPC · JPL
528502	2008 UN_{81}	—	September 22, 2008	Kitt Peak	Spacewatch	·	510 m	MPC · JPL
528503	2008 UR_{81}	—	October 8, 2008	Kitt Peak	Spacewatch	·	1.9 km	MPC · JPL
528504	2008 UB_{83}	—	September 29, 2008	Kitt Peak	Spacewatch	·	1.2 km	MPC · JPL
528505	2008 UW_{87}	—	October 1, 2008	Mount Lemmon	Mount Lemmon Survey	KOR	1.1 km	MPC · JPL
528506	2008 UO_{92}	—	October 7, 2008	Mount Lemmon	Mount Lemmon Survey	·	630 m	MPC · JPL
528507	2008 UC_{95}	—	October 29, 2008	Socorro	LINEAR	AMO	650 m	MPC · JPL
528508	2008 UX_{105}	—	September 23, 2008	Kitt Peak	Spacewatch	·	390 m	MPC · JPL
528509	2008 UL_{106}	—	October 21, 2008	Kitt Peak	Spacewatch	·	630 m	MPC · JPL
528510	2008 UY_{109}	—	October 22, 2008	Kitt Peak	Spacewatch	·	2.2 km	MPC · JPL
528511	2008 UH_{111}	—	October 22, 2008	Kitt Peak	Spacewatch	·	1.3 km	MPC · JPL
528512	2008 UL_{111}	—	September 29, 2008	Mount Lemmon	Mount Lemmon Survey	·	2.0 km	MPC · JPL
528513	2008 UG_{114}	—	October 22, 2008	Kitt Peak	Spacewatch	·	1.6 km	MPC · JPL
528514	2008 UE_{115}	—	September 30, 2008	Mount Lemmon	Mount Lemmon Survey	·	570 m	MPC · JPL
528515	2008 UW_{115}	—	October 25, 2003	Kitt Peak	Spacewatch	·	1.9 km	MPC · JPL
528516	2008 UY_{115}	—	September 30, 2008	Mount Lemmon	Mount Lemmon Survey	·	1.9 km	MPC · JPL
528517	2008 UR_{116}	—	October 22, 2008	Kitt Peak	Spacewatch	·	1.8 km	MPC · JPL
528518	2008 UU_{116}	—	October 22, 2008	Kitt Peak	Spacewatch	·	820 m	MPC · JPL
528519	2008 UM_{121}	—	October 22, 2008	Kitt Peak	Spacewatch	EUN	1.7 km	MPC · JPL
528520	2008 UZ_{122}	—	October 22, 2008	Kitt Peak	Spacewatch	·	1.4 km	MPC · JPL
528521	2008 UH_{123}	—	October 22, 2008	Kitt Peak	Spacewatch	·	1.8 km	MPC · JPL
528522	2008 UC_{124}	—	October 22, 2008	Kitt Peak	Spacewatch	·	1.9 km	MPC · JPL
528523	2008 UA_{125}	—	October 22, 2008	Kitt Peak	Spacewatch	·	2.1 km	MPC · JPL
528524	2008 UP_{125}	—	October 22, 2008	Kitt Peak	Spacewatch	615	1.2 km	MPC · JPL
528525	2008 UO_{127}	—	October 22, 2008	Kitt Peak	Spacewatch	·	1.8 km	MPC · JPL
528526	2008 UP_{133}	—	October 23, 2008	Kitt Peak	Spacewatch	3:2 · SHU	4.2 km	MPC · JPL
528527	2008 UL_{138}	—	October 23, 2008	Kitt Peak	Spacewatch	MRX	790 m	MPC · JPL
528528	2008 UX_{140}	—	May 20, 2006	Kitt Peak	Spacewatch	·	1.5 km	MPC · JPL
528529	2008 UX_{142}	—	September 23, 2008	Mount Lemmon	Mount Lemmon Survey	·	550 m	MPC · JPL
528530	2008 UX_{147}	—	October 23, 2008	Kitt Peak	Spacewatch	·	1.3 km	MPC · JPL
528531	2008 UE_{154}	—	October 23, 2008	Kitt Peak	Spacewatch	·	580 m	MPC · JPL
528532	2008 UF_{159}	—	October 4, 2008	Mount Lemmon	Mount Lemmon Survey	·	1.8 km	MPC · JPL
528533	2008 UK_{160}	—	September 28, 2008	Mount Lemmon	Mount Lemmon Survey	·	670 m	MPC · JPL
528534	2008 UW_{164}	—	September 22, 2008	Kitt Peak	Spacewatch	·	1.6 km	MPC · JPL
528535	2008 UQ_{165}	—	October 24, 2008	Kitt Peak	Spacewatch	·	1.5 km	MPC · JPL
528536	2008 UL_{171}	—	October 24, 2008	Kitt Peak	Spacewatch	EOS	1.6 km	MPC · JPL
528537	2008 UJ_{178}	—	October 24, 2008	Mount Lemmon	Mount Lemmon Survey	·	1.6 km	MPC · JPL
528538	2008 UE_{179}	—	October 24, 2008	Kitt Peak	Spacewatch	·	530 m	MPC · JPL
528539	2008 UA_{180}	—	October 20, 2008	Kitt Peak	Spacewatch	MAR	860 m	MPC · JPL
528540	2008 UL_{183}	—	September 23, 2008	Kitt Peak	Spacewatch	·	1.4 km	MPC · JPL
528541	2008 UK_{184}	—	September 22, 2008	Mount Lemmon	Mount Lemmon Survey	·	2.0 km	MPC · JPL
528542	2008 UP_{186}	—	October 24, 2008	Kitt Peak	Spacewatch	EOS	1.9 km	MPC · JPL
528543	2008 UC_{195}	—	March 10, 2005	Mount Lemmon	Mount Lemmon Survey	TEL	1.3 km	MPC · JPL
528544	2008 UY_{206}	—	September 6, 2008	Mount Lemmon	Mount Lemmon Survey	KON	2.0 km	MPC · JPL
528545	2008 UJ_{207}	—	October 6, 2008	Kitt Peak	Spacewatch	·	540 m	MPC · JPL
528546	2008 UU_{207}	—	October 9, 2008	Kitt Peak	Spacewatch	·	430 m	MPC · JPL
528547	2008 UK_{208}	—	October 23, 2008	Kitt Peak	Spacewatch	·	480 m	MPC · JPL
528548	2008 UH_{217}	—	October 2, 2008	Mount Lemmon	Mount Lemmon Survey	·	2.3 km	MPC · JPL
528549	2008 UH_{219}	—	October 25, 2008	Kitt Peak	Spacewatch	·	1.8 km	MPC · JPL
528550	2008 UE_{221}	—	March 23, 2006	Mount Lemmon	Mount Lemmon Survey	·	2.1 km	MPC · JPL
528551	2008 UT_{227}	—	October 25, 2008	Kitt Peak	Spacewatch	·	480 m	MPC · JPL
528552	2008 US_{228}	—	October 25, 2008	Kitt Peak	Spacewatch	H	300 m	MPC · JPL
528553	2008 UD_{230}	—	October 25, 2008	Mount Lemmon	Mount Lemmon Survey	·	2.9 km	MPC · JPL
528554	2008 UR_{231}	—	October 10, 2008	Mount Lemmon	Mount Lemmon Survey	·	1.6 km	MPC · JPL
528555	2008 UL_{233}	—	October 26, 2008	Kitt Peak	Spacewatch	·	1.6 km	MPC · JPL
528556	2008 UR_{234}	—	October 26, 2008	Kitt Peak	Spacewatch	·	1.6 km	MPC · JPL
528557	2008 UM_{239}	—	October 26, 2008	Kitt Peak	Spacewatch	·	1.8 km	MPC · JPL
528558	2008 UT_{243}	—	October 26, 2008	Kitt Peak	Spacewatch	·	1.1 km	MPC · JPL
528559	2008 UT_{246}	—	September 29, 2008	Kitt Peak	Spacewatch	KON	1.9 km	MPC · JPL
528560	2008 UJ_{252}	—	October 27, 2008	Kitt Peak	Spacewatch	·	470 m	MPC · JPL
528561	2008 US_{252}	—	October 27, 2008	Kitt Peak	Spacewatch	·	1.3 km	MPC · JPL
528562	2008 UC_{256}	—	October 27, 2008	Kitt Peak	Spacewatch	·	1.7 km	MPC · JPL
528563	2008 UZ_{259}	—	February 24, 2006	Kitt Peak	Spacewatch	·	1.4 km	MPC · JPL
528564	2008 UR_{260}	—	October 27, 2008	Mount Lemmon	Mount Lemmon Survey	·	470 m	MPC · JPL
528565	2008 UC_{267}	—	October 28, 2008	Kitt Peak	Spacewatch	·	1.5 km	MPC · JPL
528566	2008 UO_{269}	—	September 24, 2008	Mount Lemmon	Mount Lemmon Survey	·	1.4 km	MPC · JPL
528567	2008 UY_{269}	—	October 28, 2008	Kitt Peak	Spacewatch	·	1.3 km	MPC · JPL
528568	2008 UE_{270}	—	October 6, 2008	Mount Lemmon	Mount Lemmon Survey	·	560 m	MPC · JPL
528569	2008 UY_{274}	—	September 22, 2008	Mount Lemmon	Mount Lemmon Survey	·	510 m	MPC · JPL
528570	2008 UO_{286}	—	October 1, 2008	Kitt Peak	Spacewatch	·	1.6 km	MPC · JPL
528571	2008 UP_{286}	—	October 28, 2008	Mount Lemmon	Mount Lemmon Survey	·	520 m	MPC · JPL
528572	2008 UK_{289}	—	October 28, 2008	Kitt Peak	Spacewatch	·	1.6 km	MPC · JPL
528573	2008 UH_{291}	—	October 10, 2008	Mount Lemmon	Mount Lemmon Survey	·	1.2 km	MPC · JPL
528574	2008 UH_{292}	—	October 29, 2008	Kitt Peak	Spacewatch	·	1.2 km	MPC · JPL
528575	2008 UQ_{301}	—	October 21, 2008	Kitt Peak	Spacewatch	·	2.5 km	MPC · JPL
528576	2008 UQ_{302}	—	October 29, 2008	Kitt Peak	Spacewatch	·	1.6 km	MPC · JPL
528577	2008 UN_{306}	—	September 23, 2008	Kitt Peak	Spacewatch	·	680 m	MPC · JPL
528578	2008 UJ_{322}	—	October 8, 2008	Mount Lemmon	Mount Lemmon Survey	·	1.5 km	MPC · JPL
528579	2008 UR_{323}	—	October 31, 2008	Catalina	CSS	·	620 m	MPC · JPL
528580	2008 UR_{324}	—	October 23, 2008	Mount Lemmon	Mount Lemmon Survey	·	2.8 km	MPC · JPL
528581	2008 UD_{328}	—	October 30, 2008	Mount Lemmon	Mount Lemmon Survey	·	2.5 km	MPC · JPL
528582	2008 UX_{333}	—	October 1, 2008	Kitt Peak	Spacewatch	·	1.8 km	MPC · JPL
528583	2008 UL_{337}	—	October 23, 2008	Kitt Peak	Spacewatch	·	550 m	MPC · JPL
528584	2008 UL_{338}	—	October 21, 2008	Kitt Peak	Spacewatch	·	2.1 km	MPC · JPL
528585	2008 UR_{339}	—	October 23, 2008	Kitt Peak	Spacewatch	·	1.1 km	MPC · JPL
528586	2008 UO_{341}	—	October 26, 2008	Kitt Peak	Spacewatch	·	600 m	MPC · JPL
528587	2008 UF_{344}	—	October 3, 2008	Mount Lemmon	Mount Lemmon Survey	·	530 m	MPC · JPL
528588	2008 UE_{347}	—	October 20, 2008	Kitt Peak	Spacewatch	AGN	1.0 km	MPC · JPL
528589	2008 UO_{347}	—	September 29, 2008	Mount Lemmon	Mount Lemmon Survey	·	1.9 km	MPC · JPL
528590	2008 UW_{347}	—	October 23, 2008	Kitt Peak	Spacewatch	·	1.1 km	MPC · JPL
528591	2008 UO_{350}	—	October 1, 2008	Mount Lemmon	Mount Lemmon Survey	·	1.5 km	MPC · JPL
528592	2008 UU_{351}	—	October 25, 2008	Socorro	LINEAR	·	1.6 km	MPC · JPL
528593	2008 UK_{354}	—	October 24, 2008	Kitt Peak	Spacewatch	KOR	1.2 km	MPC · JPL
528594	2008 UA_{356}	—	October 25, 2008	Kitt Peak	Spacewatch	·	560 m	MPC · JPL
528595	2008 UV_{356}	—	October 23, 2008	Kitt Peak	Spacewatch	·	1.5 km	MPC · JPL
528596	2008 UL_{357}	—	October 24, 2008	Kitt Peak	Spacewatch	ADE	1.8 km	MPC · JPL
528597	2008 UQ_{360}	—	October 24, 2008	Kitt Peak	Spacewatch	·	1.2 km	MPC · JPL
528598	2008 UR_{360}	—	October 28, 2008	Kitt Peak	Spacewatch	EOS	1.4 km	MPC · JPL
528599	2008 UP_{363}	—	January 8, 2005	Pla D'Arguines	R. Ferrando	·	2.2 km	MPC · JPL
528600	2008 UM_{367}	—	October 24, 2008	Catalina	CSS	GEF	1.5 km	MPC · JPL

== 528601–528700 ==
back to top

Designation			Discovery			Properties		Ref
Permanent	Provisional	Named after	Date	Site	Discoverer(s)	Category	Diam.	Ref
528601	2008 UY_{367}	—	October 10, 2008	Mount Lemmon	Mount Lemmon Survey	·	510 m	MPC · JPL
528602	2008 UJ_{369}	—	October 28, 2008	Kitt Peak	Spacewatch	·	1.6 km	MPC · JPL
528603	2008 UL_{374}	—	September 9, 2008	Mount Lemmon	Mount Lemmon Survey	·	1.8 km	MPC · JPL
528604	2008 UM_{374}	—	October 25, 2008	Mount Lemmon	Mount Lemmon Survey	·	1.5 km	MPC · JPL
528605	2008 UO_{374}	—	October 23, 2008	Mount Lemmon	Mount Lemmon Survey	·	2.1 km	MPC · JPL
528606	2008 UP_{374}	—	October 28, 2008	Kitt Peak	Spacewatch	AGN	1.2 km	MPC · JPL
528607	2008 UT_{374}	—	October 21, 2008	Kitt Peak	Spacewatch	·	2.2 km	MPC · JPL
528608	2008 UX_{375}	—	October 30, 2008	Mount Lemmon	Mount Lemmon Survey	·	1.9 km	MPC · JPL
528609	2008 VU_{4}	—	November 7, 2008	Catalina	CSS	APO +1km	1.1 km	MPC · JPL
528610	2008 VO_{10}	—	May 7, 2006	Mount Lemmon	Mount Lemmon Survey	·	2.4 km	MPC · JPL
528611	2008 VS_{11}	—	October 10, 2008	Mount Lemmon	Mount Lemmon Survey	·	580 m	MPC · JPL
528612	2008 VS_{16}	—	November 1, 2008	Kitt Peak	Spacewatch	·	910 m	MPC · JPL
528613	2008 VX_{24}	—	September 23, 2008	Kitt Peak	Spacewatch	·	1.7 km	MPC · JPL
528614	2008 VD_{25}	—	November 2, 2008	Kitt Peak	Spacewatch	·	1.3 km	MPC · JPL
528615	2008 VO_{26}	—	October 25, 2008	Kitt Peak	Spacewatch	·	1.6 km	MPC · JPL
528616	2008 VP_{38}	—	November 2, 2008	Kitt Peak	Spacewatch	·	2.1 km	MPC · JPL
528617	2008 VM_{40}	—	October 25, 2008	Catalina	CSS	H	540 m	MPC · JPL
528618	2008 VR_{43}	—	October 26, 2008	Kitt Peak	Spacewatch	·	690 m	MPC · JPL
528619	2008 VZ_{48}	—	October 30, 2008	Kitt Peak	Spacewatch	·	1.4 km	MPC · JPL
528620	2008 VY_{50}	—	November 4, 2008	Kitt Peak	Spacewatch	·	1.5 km	MPC · JPL
528621	2008 VF_{52}	—	October 8, 2008	Mount Lemmon	Mount Lemmon Survey	·	1.4 km	MPC · JPL
528622	2008 VQ_{52}	—	November 6, 2008	Mount Lemmon	Mount Lemmon Survey	·	1.5 km	MPC · JPL
528623	2008 VK_{58}	—	October 30, 2008	Kitt Peak	Spacewatch	H	320 m	MPC · JPL
528624	2008 VT_{59}	—	September 29, 2008	Catalina	CSS	H	530 m	MPC · JPL
528625	2008 VN_{62}	—	October 20, 2008	Kitt Peak	Spacewatch	·	440 m	MPC · JPL
528626	2008 VP_{63}	—	November 1, 2008	Kitt Peak	Spacewatch	·	1.3 km	MPC · JPL
528627	2008 VS_{67}	—	November 8, 2008	Kitt Peak	Spacewatch	H	350 m	MPC · JPL
528628	2008 VZ_{69}	—	November 6, 2008	Mount Lemmon	Mount Lemmon Survey	·	1.6 km	MPC · JPL
528629	2008 VM_{70}	—	November 7, 2008	Mount Lemmon	Mount Lemmon Survey	·	1.9 km	MPC · JPL
528630	2008 VT_{70}	—	October 23, 2008	Kitt Peak	Spacewatch	EOS	1.3 km	MPC · JPL
528631	2008 VA_{72}	—	November 1, 2008	Kitt Peak	Spacewatch	·	1.6 km	MPC · JPL
528632	2008 VC_{72}	—	November 6, 2008	Kitt Peak	Spacewatch	·	3.5 km	MPC · JPL
528633	2008 VT_{72}	—	November 8, 2008	Mount Lemmon	Mount Lemmon Survey	·	1.7 km	MPC · JPL
528634	2008 VY_{73}	—	November 7, 2008	Mount Lemmon	Mount Lemmon Survey	·	1.7 km	MPC · JPL
528635	2008 VE_{76}	—	November 1, 2008	Mount Lemmon	Mount Lemmon Survey	·	1.7 km	MPC · JPL
528636	2008 VR_{77}	—	November 6, 2008	Mount Lemmon	Mount Lemmon Survey	·	550 m	MPC · JPL
528637	2008 VB_{82}	—	November 6, 2008	Mount Lemmon	Mount Lemmon Survey	·	2.6 km	MPC · JPL
528638	2008 VH_{82}	—	September 18, 2003	Kitt Peak	Spacewatch	·	2.3 km	MPC · JPL
528639	2008 VT_{82}	—	November 1, 2008	Mount Lemmon	Mount Lemmon Survey	·	540 m	MPC · JPL
528640	2008 VU_{82}	—	November 9, 2008	Kitt Peak	Spacewatch	·	1.7 km	MPC · JPL
528641	2008 WX_{1}	—	October 3, 2008	Mount Lemmon	Mount Lemmon Survey	·	2.3 km	MPC · JPL
528642	2008 WP_{8}	—	November 17, 2008	Kitt Peak	Spacewatch	·	470 m	MPC · JPL
528643	2008 WR_{8}	—	November 8, 2008	Mount Lemmon	Mount Lemmon Survey	HOF	2.0 km	MPC · JPL
528644	2008 WX_{14}	—	November 17, 2008	Kitt Peak	Spacewatch	·	1.3 km	MPC · JPL
528645	2008 WA_{17}	—	October 22, 2008	Kitt Peak	Spacewatch	H	330 m	MPC · JPL
528646	2008 WL_{20}	—	October 27, 2008	Kitt Peak	Spacewatch	EOS	1.5 km	MPC · JPL
528647	2008 WL_{21}	—	October 28, 2008	Kitt Peak	Spacewatch	·	2.1 km	MPC · JPL
528648	2008 WB_{24}	—	November 18, 2008	Catalina	CSS	·	440 m	MPC · JPL
528649	2008 WT_{29}	—	November 19, 2008	Mount Lemmon	Mount Lemmon Survey	·	2.1 km	MPC · JPL
528650	2008 WX_{32}	—	November 2, 2008	Mount Lemmon	Mount Lemmon Survey	APO	500 m	MPC · JPL
528651	2008 WE_{47}	—	November 3, 2008	Kitt Peak	Spacewatch	·	1.1 km	MPC · JPL
528652	2008 WJ_{47}	—	October 30, 2008	Kitt Peak	Spacewatch	·	1.5 km	MPC · JPL
528653	2008 WA_{48}	—	November 17, 2008	Kitt Peak	Spacewatch	·	1.8 km	MPC · JPL
528654	2008 WQ_{48}	—	October 6, 2008	Mount Lemmon	Mount Lemmon Survey	·	1.3 km	MPC · JPL
528655	2008 WU_{50}	—	October 6, 2008	Mount Lemmon	Mount Lemmon Survey	·	1.9 km	MPC · JPL
528656	2008 WU_{67}	—	October 23, 2008	Mount Lemmon	Mount Lemmon Survey	·	2.4 km	MPC · JPL
528657	2008 WN_{69}	—	November 18, 2008	Kitt Peak	Spacewatch	·	1.8 km	MPC · JPL
528658	2008 WD_{70}	—	November 18, 2008	Kitt Peak	Spacewatch	·	2.3 km	MPC · JPL
528659	2008 WK_{73}	—	November 19, 2008	Mount Lemmon	Mount Lemmon Survey	·	570 m	MPC · JPL
528660	2008 WH_{77}	—	November 7, 2008	Mount Lemmon	Mount Lemmon Survey	·	1.7 km	MPC · JPL
528661	2008 WT_{81}	—	November 7, 2008	Mount Lemmon	Mount Lemmon Survey	·	600 m	MPC · JPL
528662	2008 WQ_{83}	—	December 17, 2003	Kitt Peak	Spacewatch	·	1.8 km	MPC · JPL
528663	2008 WR_{83}	—	November 20, 2008	Kitt Peak	Spacewatch	·	470 m	MPC · JPL
528664	2008 WV_{93}	—	November 28, 2008	Piszkéstető	K. Sárneczky, Orgel, C.	·	500 m	MPC · JPL
528665	2008 WN_{99}	—	October 28, 2008	Kitt Peak	Spacewatch	·	2.0 km	MPC · JPL
528666	2008 WA_{100}	—	November 8, 2008	Mount Lemmon	Mount Lemmon Survey	·	1.4 km	MPC · JPL
528667	2008 WX_{102}	—	September 28, 2008	Mount Lemmon	Mount Lemmon Survey	·	660 m	MPC · JPL
528668	2008 WN_{110}	—	October 30, 2008	Kitt Peak	Spacewatch	EOS	1.5 km	MPC · JPL
528669	2008 WP_{112}	—	October 26, 2008	Kitt Peak	Spacewatch	·	600 m	MPC · JPL
528670	2008 WC_{113}	—	November 30, 2008	Kitt Peak	Spacewatch	·	2.2 km	MPC · JPL
528671	2008 WO_{115}	—	November 18, 2008	Kitt Peak	Spacewatch	·	2.8 km	MPC · JPL
528672	2008 WX_{122}	—	November 30, 2008	Mount Lemmon	Mount Lemmon Survey	·	1.7 km	MPC · JPL
528673	2008 WS_{123}	—	November 6, 2008	Mount Lemmon	Mount Lemmon Survey	·	1.9 km	MPC · JPL
528674	2008 WW_{125}	—	November 21, 2008	Mount Lemmon	Mount Lemmon Survey	·	2.7 km	MPC · JPL
528675	2008 WC_{128}	—	September 29, 2008	Mount Lemmon	Mount Lemmon Survey	EOS	1.6 km	MPC · JPL
528676	2008 WP_{130}	—	November 24, 2008	Kitt Peak	Spacewatch	·	680 m	MPC · JPL
528677	2008 WJ_{131}	—	January 31, 2006	Anderson Mesa	LONEOS	·	770 m	MPC · JPL
528678	2008 WJ_{143}	—	November 20, 2008	Kitt Peak	Spacewatch	·	1.4 km	MPC · JPL
528679	2008 WO_{143}	—	November 18, 2008	Kitt Peak	Spacewatch	·	1.2 km	MPC · JPL
528680	2008 WQ_{143}	—	November 19, 2008	Kitt Peak	Spacewatch	·	2.2 km	MPC · JPL
528681	2008 WX_{143}	—	November 24, 2008	Mount Lemmon	Mount Lemmon Survey	·	1.3 km	MPC · JPL
528682	2008 WB_{144}	—	November 19, 2008	Mount Lemmon	Mount Lemmon Survey	·	1.1 km	MPC · JPL
528683	2008 WE_{144}	—	November 20, 2008	Kitt Peak	Spacewatch	·	790 m	MPC · JPL
528684	2008 XM_{2}	—	December 5, 2008	Mount Lemmon	Mount Lemmon Survey	H	610 m	MPC · JPL
528685	2008 XC_{14}	—	October 28, 2008	Kitt Peak	Spacewatch	·	1.4 km	MPC · JPL
528686	2008 XG_{22}	—	November 20, 2008	Kitt Peak	Spacewatch	·	1.7 km	MPC · JPL
528687	2008 XJ_{31}	—	November 19, 2008	Kitt Peak	Spacewatch	·	1.2 km	MPC · JPL
528688	2008 XN_{31}	—	October 27, 2008	Kitt Peak	Spacewatch	·	590 m	MPC · JPL
528689	2008 XP_{31}	—	November 8, 2008	Kitt Peak	Spacewatch	EOS	1.6 km	MPC · JPL
528690	2008 XM_{39}	—	December 2, 2008	Kitt Peak	Spacewatch	·	1.7 km	MPC · JPL
528691	2008 XP_{44}	—	December 3, 2008	Catalina	CSS	·	1.6 km	MPC · JPL
528692	2008 XE_{50}	—	October 24, 2008	Mount Lemmon	Mount Lemmon Survey	·	2.5 km	MPC · JPL
528693	2008 XM_{57}	—	January 4, 2003	Kitt Peak	Deep Lens Survey	·	2.0 km	MPC · JPL
528694	2008 YU	—	December 20, 2008	Pla D'Arguines	R. Ferrando	·	1.7 km	MPC · JPL
528695	2008 YG_{2}	—	December 21, 2008	Mount Lemmon	Mount Lemmon Survey	H	380 m	MPC · JPL
528696	2008 YT_{4}	—	December 22, 2008	Calar Alto	F. Hormuth	·	1.9 km	MPC · JPL
528697	2008 YY_{7}	—	November 17, 2008	Catalina	CSS	PHO	1.3 km	MPC · JPL
528698	2008 YH_{8}	—	December 23, 2008	Weihai	University, Shandong	·	4.3 km	MPC · JPL
528699	2008 YO_{11}	—	November 6, 2008	Mount Lemmon	Mount Lemmon Survey	·	1.2 km	MPC · JPL
528700	2008 YB_{12}	—	December 4, 2008	Kitt Peak	Spacewatch	·	2.6 km	MPC · JPL

== 528701–528800 ==
back to top

Designation			Discovery			Properties		Ref
Permanent	Provisional	Named after	Date	Site	Discoverer(s)	Category	Diam.	Ref
528701	2008 YF_{15}	—	December 21, 2008	Kitt Peak	Spacewatch	·	550 m	MPC · JPL
528702	2008 YS_{15}	—	December 21, 2008	Mount Lemmon	Mount Lemmon Survey	(1338) (FLO)	530 m	MPC · JPL
528703	2008 YK_{18}	—	December 21, 2008	Kitt Peak	Spacewatch	VER	2.9 km	MPC · JPL
528704	2008 YP_{21}	—	December 21, 2008	Mount Lemmon	Mount Lemmon Survey	H	410 m	MPC · JPL
528705	2008 YH_{22}	—	December 21, 2008	Mount Lemmon	Mount Lemmon Survey	EOS	1.9 km	MPC · JPL
528706	2008 YL_{28}	—	November 24, 2008	Kitt Peak	Spacewatch	·	510 m	MPC · JPL
528707	2008 YR_{32}	—	August 10, 2007	Kitt Peak	Spacewatch	·	1.5 km	MPC · JPL
528708	2008 YG_{35}	—	December 4, 2008	Mount Lemmon	Mount Lemmon Survey	·	1.1 km	MPC · JPL
528709	2008 YV_{35}	—	December 22, 2008	Kitt Peak	Spacewatch	·	2.0 km	MPC · JPL
528710	2008 YY_{45}	—	December 29, 2008	Mount Lemmon	Mount Lemmon Survey	·	3.9 km	MPC · JPL
528711	2008 YV_{47}	—	December 21, 2008	Kitt Peak	Spacewatch	·	1.8 km	MPC · JPL
528712	2008 YB_{48}	—	December 29, 2008	Mount Lemmon	Mount Lemmon Survey	·	1.9 km	MPC · JPL
528713	2008 YZ_{49}	—	September 10, 2007	Kitt Peak	Spacewatch	THM	1.9 km	MPC · JPL
528714	2008 YF_{55}	—	December 29, 2008	Mount Lemmon	Mount Lemmon Survey	·	540 m	MPC · JPL
528715	2008 YL_{55}	—	December 22, 2008	Kitt Peak	Spacewatch	EOS	2.0 km	MPC · JPL
528716	2008 YH_{63}	—	December 30, 2008	Mount Lemmon	Mount Lemmon Survey	·	2.3 km	MPC · JPL
528717	2008 YC_{64}	—	December 30, 2008	Mount Lemmon	Mount Lemmon Survey	·	2.0 km	MPC · JPL
528718	2008 YS_{64}	—	December 30, 2008	Mount Lemmon	Mount Lemmon Survey	·	2.6 km	MPC · JPL
528719	2008 YP_{74}	—	December 30, 2008	Kitt Peak	Spacewatch	·	1.5 km	MPC · JPL
528720	2008 YC_{79}	—	December 30, 2008	Mount Lemmon	Mount Lemmon Survey	·	1.3 km	MPC · JPL
528721	2008 YU_{79}	—	December 30, 2008	Mount Lemmon	Mount Lemmon Survey	·	2.7 km	MPC · JPL
528722	2008 YG_{84}	—	December 3, 2008	Mount Lemmon	Mount Lemmon Survey	·	1.8 km	MPC · JPL
528723	2008 YJ_{84}	—	December 3, 2008	Mount Lemmon	Mount Lemmon Survey	·	2.3 km	MPC · JPL
528724	2008 YV_{84}	—	December 3, 2008	Mount Lemmon	Mount Lemmon Survey	·	2.5 km	MPC · JPL
528725	2008 YQ_{91}	—	December 21, 2008	Kitt Peak	Spacewatch	·	580 m	MPC · JPL
528726	2008 YK_{93}	—	September 14, 2007	Mount Lemmon	Mount Lemmon Survey	KOR	1.3 km	MPC · JPL
528727	2008 YL_{94}	—	December 21, 2008	Mount Lemmon	Mount Lemmon Survey	·	460 m	MPC · JPL
528728	2008 YC_{97}	—	December 22, 2008	Kitt Peak	Spacewatch	·	1.3 km	MPC · JPL
528729	2008 YH_{99}	—	December 29, 2008	Kitt Peak	Spacewatch	·	550 m	MPC · JPL
528730	2008 YS_{104}	—	December 29, 2008	Kitt Peak	Spacewatch	·	1.7 km	MPC · JPL
528731	2008 YP_{113}	—	December 29, 2008	Kitt Peak	Spacewatch	·	1.9 km	MPC · JPL
528732	2008 YB_{119}	—	December 29, 2008	Kitt Peak	Spacewatch	·	2.4 km	MPC · JPL
528733	2008 YA_{120}	—	December 22, 2008	Kitt Peak	Spacewatch	·	690 m	MPC · JPL
528734	2008 YV_{120}	—	December 22, 2008	Kitt Peak	Spacewatch	·	1.3 km	MPC · JPL
528735	2008 YC_{126}	—	December 22, 2008	Kitt Peak	Spacewatch	·	430 m	MPC · JPL
528736	2008 YS_{126}	—	December 30, 2008	Kitt Peak	Spacewatch	slow	1.0 km	MPC · JPL
528737	2008 YW_{133}	—	December 4, 2008	Kitt Peak	Spacewatch	DOR	1.7 km	MPC · JPL
528738	2008 YH_{138}	—	December 22, 2008	Mount Lemmon	Mount Lemmon Survey	·	1.8 km	MPC · JPL
528739	2008 YJ_{138}	—	December 22, 2008	Mount Lemmon	Mount Lemmon Survey	EOS	1.9 km	MPC · JPL
528740	2008 YV_{141}	—	December 30, 2008	Kitt Peak	Spacewatch	·	520 m	MPC · JPL
528741	2008 YB_{142}	—	October 31, 2008	Mount Lemmon	Mount Lemmon Survey	·	2.2 km	MPC · JPL
528742	2008 YS_{148}	—	December 1, 2008	Mount Lemmon	Mount Lemmon Survey	·	3.3 km	MPC · JPL
528743	2008 YH_{149}	—	December 21, 2008	Kitt Peak	Spacewatch	·	3.2 km	MPC · JPL
528744	2008 YD_{150}	—	December 21, 2008	Mount Lemmon	Mount Lemmon Survey	·	1.7 km	MPC · JPL
528745	2008 YU_{150}	—	December 22, 2008	Kitt Peak	Spacewatch	·	610 m	MPC · JPL
528746	2008 YZ_{153}	—	December 21, 2008	Mount Lemmon	Mount Lemmon Survey	·	590 m	MPC · JPL
528747	2008 YE_{158}	—	December 30, 2008	Kitt Peak	Spacewatch	EOS	1.6 km	MPC · JPL
528748	2008 YL_{161}	—	November 19, 2008	Mount Lemmon	Mount Lemmon Survey	·	2.4 km	MPC · JPL
528749	2008 YH_{164}	—	December 21, 2008	Kitt Peak	Spacewatch	·	1.5 km	MPC · JPL
528750	2008 YQ_{172}	—	December 21, 2008	Mount Lemmon	Mount Lemmon Survey	·	1.4 km	MPC · JPL
528751	2008 YY_{174}	—	September 15, 2007	Mount Lemmon	Mount Lemmon Survey	·	1.5 km	MPC · JPL
528752	2008 YU_{175}	—	December 22, 2008	Kitt Peak	Spacewatch	KOR	1.1 km	MPC · JPL
528753	2008 YW_{175}	—	December 21, 2008	Kitt Peak	Spacewatch	·	1.9 km	MPC · JPL
528754	2008 YX_{175}	—	December 22, 2008	Kitt Peak	Spacewatch	·	2.2 km	MPC · JPL
528755	2008 YY_{175}	—	September 11, 2007	Mount Lemmon	Mount Lemmon Survey	·	3.2 km	MPC · JPL
528756	2009 AS	—	January 1, 2009	Mount Lemmon	Mount Lemmon Survey	AMO	750 m	MPC · JPL
528757	2009 AU_{8}	—	January 1, 2009	Kitt Peak	Spacewatch	·	560 m	MPC · JPL
528758	2009 AH_{9}	—	December 5, 2008	Mount Lemmon	Mount Lemmon Survey	TIR	1.8 km	MPC · JPL
528759	2009 AR_{15}	—	January 2, 2009	Kitt Peak	Spacewatch	·	490 m	MPC · JPL
528760	2009 AO_{17}	—	January 2, 2009	Kitt Peak	Spacewatch	·	2.5 km	MPC · JPL
528761	2009 AS_{18}	—	December 4, 2008	Mount Lemmon	Mount Lemmon Survey	·	3.0 km	MPC · JPL
528762	2009 AO_{20}	—	December 4, 2008	Mount Lemmon	Mount Lemmon Survey	·	1.3 km	MPC · JPL
528763	2009 AC_{24}	—	December 22, 2008	Mount Lemmon	Mount Lemmon Survey	·	1.7 km	MPC · JPL
528764	2009 AA_{31}	—	January 15, 2009	Kitt Peak	Spacewatch	·	2.4 km	MPC · JPL
528765	2009 AU_{31}	—	December 21, 2008	Kitt Peak	Spacewatch	·	2.7 km	MPC · JPL
528766	2009 AA_{37}	—	December 4, 2008	Mount Lemmon	Mount Lemmon Survey	·	1.7 km	MPC · JPL
528767	2009 AJ_{42}	—	January 1, 2009	Mount Lemmon	Mount Lemmon Survey	CYB	4.0 km	MPC · JPL
528768	2009 AA_{45}	—	January 3, 2009	Kitt Peak	Spacewatch	AGN	1.1 km	MPC · JPL
528769	2009 AT_{45}	—	January 1, 2009	Kitt Peak	Spacewatch	·	2.2 km	MPC · JPL
528770	2009 AP_{47}	—	January 3, 2009	Kitt Peak	Spacewatch	·	1.3 km	MPC · JPL
528771	2009 AU_{51}	—	December 21, 2008	Mount Lemmon	Mount Lemmon Survey	·	2.0 km	MPC · JPL
528772	2009 AV_{51}	—	January 15, 2009	Kitt Peak	Spacewatch	GEF	1.6 km	MPC · JPL
528773	2009 AH_{52}	—	January 2, 2009	Mount Lemmon	Mount Lemmon Survey	·	2.7 km	MPC · JPL
528774	2009 AQ_{52}	—	January 2, 2009	Mount Lemmon	Mount Lemmon Survey	·	670 m	MPC · JPL
528775	2009 BU_{3}	—	January 18, 2009	Socorro	LINEAR	·	2.3 km	MPC · JPL
528776	2009 BS_{6}	—	December 22, 2008	Mount Lemmon	Mount Lemmon Survey	·	2.6 km	MPC · JPL
528777	2009 BB_{8}	—	October 30, 2008	Mount Lemmon	Mount Lemmon Survey	·	1.9 km	MPC · JPL
528778	2009 BF_{11}	—	January 26, 2009	Socorro	LINEAR	H	650 m	MPC · JPL
528779	2009 BU_{13}	—	December 29, 2008	Catalina	CSS	·	1.1 km	MPC · JPL
528780	2009 BU_{14}	—	December 31, 2008	Kitt Peak	Spacewatch	·	2.7 km	MPC · JPL
528781	2009 BH_{18}	—	December 21, 2008	Mount Lemmon	Mount Lemmon Survey	THM	1.8 km	MPC · JPL
528782	2009 BP_{19}	—	January 16, 2009	Mount Lemmon	Mount Lemmon Survey	THM	1.9 km	MPC · JPL
528783	2009 BM_{22}	—	January 1, 2009	Mount Lemmon	Mount Lemmon Survey	·	2.4 km	MPC · JPL
528784	2009 BC_{23}	—	January 17, 2009	Kitt Peak	Spacewatch	·	640 m	MPC · JPL
528785	2009 BN_{23}	—	January 17, 2009	Kitt Peak	Spacewatch	EOS	1.8 km	MPC · JPL
528786	2009 BT_{25}	—	December 31, 2008	Mount Lemmon	Mount Lemmon Survey	·	870 m	MPC · JPL
528787	2009 BX_{27}	—	January 16, 2009	Kitt Peak	Spacewatch	AST	1.3 km	MPC · JPL
528788	2009 BT_{30}	—	January 16, 2009	Kitt Peak	Spacewatch	THM	1.9 km	MPC · JPL
528789	2009 BT_{31}	—	January 16, 2009	Kitt Peak	Spacewatch	·	2.3 km	MPC · JPL
528790	2009 BF_{36}	—	January 16, 2009	Kitt Peak	Spacewatch	·	1.7 km	MPC · JPL
528791	2009 BR_{36}	—	January 16, 2009	Kitt Peak	Spacewatch	·	2.3 km	MPC · JPL
528792	2009 BO_{37}	—	January 1, 2009	Mount Lemmon	Mount Lemmon Survey	·	840 m	MPC · JPL
528793	2009 BR_{38}	—	January 16, 2009	Kitt Peak	Spacewatch	·	2.5 km	MPC · JPL
528794	2009 BG_{46}	—	January 16, 2009	Kitt Peak	Spacewatch	·	1.9 km	MPC · JPL
528795	2009 BM_{48}	—	January 16, 2009	Kitt Peak	Spacewatch	NYS	610 m	MPC · JPL
528796	2009 BV_{48}	—	January 16, 2009	Mount Lemmon	Mount Lemmon Survey	·	520 m	MPC · JPL
528797	2009 BB_{52}	—	January 16, 2009	Mount Lemmon	Mount Lemmon Survey	·	650 m	MPC · JPL
528798	2009 BS_{52}	—	January 16, 2009	Mount Lemmon	Mount Lemmon Survey	·	1.6 km	MPC · JPL
528799	2009 BV_{52}	—	January 16, 2009	Mount Lemmon	Mount Lemmon Survey	·	1.7 km	MPC · JPL
528800	2009 BG_{53}	—	December 30, 2008	Mount Lemmon	Mount Lemmon Survey	·	2.8 km	MPC · JPL

== 528801–528900 ==
back to top

Designation			Discovery			Properties		Ref
Permanent	Provisional	Named after	Date	Site	Discoverer(s)	Category	Diam.	Ref
528801	2009 BF_{54}	—	January 1, 2009	Mount Lemmon	Mount Lemmon Survey	·	1.9 km	MPC · JPL
528802	2009 BE_{56}	—	January 3, 2009	Kitt Peak	Spacewatch	·	2.4 km	MPC · JPL
528803	2009 BJ_{56}	—	January 17, 2009	Mount Lemmon	Mount Lemmon Survey	·	2.1 km	MPC · JPL
528804	2009 BJ_{58}	—	January 29, 2009	Catalina	CSS	APO · PHA	560 m	MPC · JPL
528805	2009 BM_{60}	—	January 18, 2009	Catalina	CSS	·	2.5 km	MPC · JPL
528806	2009 BP_{61}	—	January 18, 2009	Kitt Peak	Spacewatch	·	520 m	MPC · JPL
528807	2009 BL_{71}	—	January 30, 2009	Catalina	CSS	ATE	140 m	MPC · JPL
528808	2009 BW_{71}	—	January 27, 2009	Cerro Burek	Burek, Cerro	·	750 m	MPC · JPL
528809	2009 BM_{72}	—	January 18, 2009	Kitt Peak	Spacewatch	DOR	1.9 km	MPC · JPL
528810	2009 BX_{74}	—	January 20, 2009	Catalina	CSS	·	720 m	MPC · JPL
528811	2009 BS_{83}	—	January 20, 2009	Kitt Peak	Spacewatch	·	2.4 km	MPC · JPL
528812	2009 BP_{86}	—	January 15, 2009	Kitt Peak	Spacewatch	·	780 m	MPC · JPL
528813	2009 BY_{88}	—	January 25, 2009	Kitt Peak	Spacewatch	·	470 m	MPC · JPL
528814	2009 BG_{91}	—	January 15, 2009	Kitt Peak	Spacewatch	·	570 m	MPC · JPL
528815	2009 BB_{92}	—	January 25, 2009	Kitt Peak	Spacewatch	EOS	1.7 km	MPC · JPL
528816	2009 BP_{96}	—	October 26, 2008	Kitt Peak	Spacewatch	·	3.9 km	MPC · JPL
528817	2009 BS_{100}	—	January 29, 2009	Kitt Peak	Spacewatch	AGN	940 m	MPC · JPL
528818	2009 BM_{103}	—	January 25, 2009	Kitt Peak	Spacewatch	·	510 m	MPC · JPL
528819	2009 BN_{105}	—	January 16, 2009	Kitt Peak	Spacewatch	·	2.5 km	MPC · JPL
528820	2009 BU_{110}	—	January 31, 2009	Mount Lemmon	Mount Lemmon Survey	·	610 m	MPC · JPL
528821	2009 BO_{114}	—	January 16, 2009	Mount Lemmon	Mount Lemmon Survey	·	2.4 km	MPC · JPL
528822	2009 BV_{115}	—	December 31, 2008	Mount Lemmon	Mount Lemmon Survey	·	2.0 km	MPC · JPL
528823	2009 BA_{118}	—	December 22, 2008	Kitt Peak	Spacewatch	·	720 m	MPC · JPL
528824	2009 BH_{121}	—	December 31, 2008	Mount Lemmon	Mount Lemmon Survey	·	2.2 km	MPC · JPL
528825	2009 BU_{123}	—	January 20, 2009	Kitt Peak	Spacewatch	·	1.8 km	MPC · JPL
528826	2009 BQ_{124}	—	January 31, 2009	Kitt Peak	Spacewatch	EUP	3.3 km	MPC · JPL
528827	2009 BZ_{125}	—	January 29, 2009	Kitt Peak	Spacewatch	·	1.4 km	MPC · JPL
528828	2009 BT_{132}	—	November 21, 2008	Mount Lemmon	Mount Lemmon Survey	TIR	2.7 km	MPC · JPL
528829	2009 BA_{135}	—	January 29, 2009	Kitt Peak	Spacewatch	THM	1.5 km	MPC · JPL
528830	2009 BJ_{136}	—	January 15, 2009	Kitt Peak	Spacewatch	·	2.1 km	MPC · JPL
528831	2009 BN_{136}	—	December 29, 2008	Mount Lemmon	Mount Lemmon Survey	·	2.9 km	MPC · JPL
528832	2009 BV_{137}	—	January 16, 2009	Mount Lemmon	Mount Lemmon Survey	THM	2.0 km	MPC · JPL
528833	2009 BD_{140}	—	December 30, 2008	Mount Lemmon	Mount Lemmon Survey	·	2.6 km	MPC · JPL
528834	2009 BD_{142}	—	January 30, 2009	Kitt Peak	Spacewatch	H	270 m	MPC · JPL
528835	2009 BP_{143}	—	January 30, 2009	Kitt Peak	Spacewatch	THM	1.9 km	MPC · JPL
528836	2009 BS_{144}	—	January 20, 2009	Kitt Peak	Spacewatch	·	3.0 km	MPC · JPL
528837	2009 BA_{145}	—	January 30, 2009	Kitt Peak	Spacewatch	H	360 m	MPC · JPL
528838	2009 BY_{145}	—	January 16, 2009	Kitt Peak	Spacewatch	·	1.7 km	MPC · JPL
528839	2009 BX_{153}	—	January 16, 2009	Mount Lemmon	Mount Lemmon Survey	·	680 m	MPC · JPL
528840	2009 BT_{155}	—	March 25, 2006	Kitt Peak	Spacewatch	·	500 m	MPC · JPL
528841	2009 BZ_{159}	—	December 31, 2008	Mount Lemmon	Mount Lemmon Survey	H	460 m	MPC · JPL
528842	2009 BB_{169}	—	September 18, 2006	Kitt Peak	Spacewatch	·	2.8 km	MPC · JPL
528843	2009 BA_{171}	—	January 16, 2009	Mount Lemmon	Mount Lemmon Survey	·	1.4 km	MPC · JPL
528844	2009 BC_{177}	—	January 19, 2009	Mount Lemmon	Mount Lemmon Survey	·	2.2 km	MPC · JPL
528845	2009 BQ_{179}	—	January 17, 2009	Kitt Peak	Spacewatch	·	2.1 km	MPC · JPL
528846	2009 BZ_{183}	—	January 20, 2009	Catalina	CSS	·	2.4 km	MPC · JPL
528847	2009 BD_{185}	—	October 11, 2007	Kitt Peak	Spacewatch	·	1.8 km	MPC · JPL
528848	2009 BG_{187}	—	January 26, 2009	Socorro	LINEAR	·	590 m	MPC · JPL
528849	2009 BK_{192}	—	October 21, 2007	Mount Lemmon	Mount Lemmon Survey	·	1.9 km	MPC · JPL
528850	2009 BP_{192}	—	January 16, 2009	Kitt Peak	Spacewatch	LIX	2.6 km	MPC · JPL
528851	2009 BW_{192}	—	January 25, 2009	Kitt Peak	Spacewatch	·	620 m	MPC · JPL
528852	2009 BX_{192}	—	January 25, 2009	Kitt Peak	Spacewatch	·	2.0 km	MPC · JPL
528853	2009 BZ_{192}	—	January 31, 2009	Mount Lemmon	Mount Lemmon Survey	·	830 m	MPC · JPL
528854	2009 BA_{193}	—	November 1, 2007	Mount Lemmon	Mount Lemmon Survey	·	1.9 km	MPC · JPL
528855	2009 BC_{193}	—	January 20, 2009	Mount Lemmon	Mount Lemmon Survey	MRX	930 m	MPC · JPL
528856	2009 BH_{193}	—	January 31, 2009	Mount Lemmon	Mount Lemmon Survey	·	1.7 km	MPC · JPL
528857	2009 CT	—	February 2, 2009	Catalina	CSS	APO	410 m	MPC · JPL
528858	2009 CB_{2}	—	February 4, 2009	Kitt Peak	Spacewatch	·	380 m	MPC · JPL
528859	2009 CR_{5}	—	February 14, 2009	Kitt Peak	Spacewatch	APO	130 m	MPC · JPL
528860	2009 CH_{13}	—	February 1, 2009	Mount Lemmon	Mount Lemmon Survey	·	2.2 km	MPC · JPL
528861	2009 CF_{19}	—	December 23, 2001	Kitt Peak	Spacewatch	(2076)	760 m	MPC · JPL
528862	2009 CU_{21}	—	January 3, 2009	Mount Lemmon	Mount Lemmon Survey	·	2.2 km	MPC · JPL
528863	2009 CZ_{22}	—	February 1, 2009	Kitt Peak	Spacewatch	·	2.4 km	MPC · JPL
528864	2009 CZ_{33}	—	November 23, 2008	Mount Lemmon	Mount Lemmon Survey	·	1.8 km	MPC · JPL
528865	2009 CF_{35}	—	February 2, 2009	Mount Lemmon	Mount Lemmon Survey	·	2.4 km	MPC · JPL
528866	2009 CX_{39}	—	October 31, 2008	Mount Lemmon	Mount Lemmon Survey	·	1.9 km	MPC · JPL
528867	2009 CK_{42}	—	January 25, 2009	Socorro	LINEAR	·	2.6 km	MPC · JPL
528868	2009 CA_{43}	—	December 22, 2008	Kitt Peak	Spacewatch	HYG	2.1 km	MPC · JPL
528869	2009 CJ_{44}	—	January 29, 2009	Mount Lemmon	Mount Lemmon Survey	·	2.3 km	MPC · JPL
528870	2009 CB_{47}	—	January 2, 2009	Mount Lemmon	Mount Lemmon Survey	·	2.9 km	MPC · JPL
528871	2009 CQ_{48}	—	December 29, 2008	Mount Lemmon	Mount Lemmon Survey	·	3.5 km	MPC · JPL
528872	2009 CO_{49}	—	February 14, 2009	Mount Lemmon	Mount Lemmon Survey	·	1.2 km	MPC · JPL
528873	2009 CW_{49}	—	January 25, 2009	Catalina	CSS	EUP	3.2 km	MPC · JPL
528874	2009 CY_{50}	—	December 21, 2008	Kitt Peak	Spacewatch	TIR	2.7 km	MPC · JPL
528875	2009 CY_{51}	—	January 18, 2009	Kitt Peak	Spacewatch	·	2.6 km	MPC · JPL
528876	2009 CL_{60}	—	February 3, 2009	Kitt Peak	Spacewatch	·	1.8 km	MPC · JPL
528877	2009 CB_{65}	—	February 5, 2009	Mount Lemmon	Mount Lemmon Survey	EUP	3.3 km	MPC · JPL
528878	2009 CG_{67}	—	February 1, 2009	Kitt Peak	Spacewatch	·	1.6 km	MPC · JPL
528879	2009 CH_{67}	—	February 1, 2009	Mount Lemmon	Mount Lemmon Survey	·	2.2 km	MPC · JPL
528880	2009 CN_{67}	—	August 21, 2006	Kitt Peak	Spacewatch	EOS	1.7 km	MPC · JPL
528881	2009 DS_{6}	—	January 1, 2009	Mount Lemmon	Mount Lemmon Survey	(2076)	690 m	MPC · JPL
528882	2009 DP_{15}	—	December 3, 2008	Mount Lemmon	Mount Lemmon Survey	·	590 m	MPC · JPL
528883	2009 DF_{18}	—	February 19, 2009	Kitt Peak	Spacewatch	·	1.7 km	MPC · JPL
528884	2009 DG_{18}	—	February 19, 2009	Kitt Peak	Spacewatch	·	1.9 km	MPC · JPL
528885	2009 DK_{22}	—	January 3, 2009	Mount Lemmon	Mount Lemmon Survey	·	800 m	MPC · JPL
528886	2009 DZ_{24}	—	February 1, 2009	Kitt Peak	Spacewatch	·	2.2 km	MPC · JPL
528887	2009 DN_{25}	—	February 1, 2009	Kitt Peak	Spacewatch	KOR	1.1 km	MPC · JPL
528888	2009 DC_{26}	—	February 21, 2009	Mount Lemmon	Mount Lemmon Survey	·	650 m	MPC · JPL
528889	2009 DT_{34}	—	February 20, 2009	Kitt Peak	Spacewatch	ERI	1.2 km	MPC · JPL
528890	2009 DD_{36}	—	February 21, 2009	Kitt Peak	Spacewatch	·	2.4 km	MPC · JPL
528891	2009 DB_{37}	—	January 15, 2009	Kitt Peak	Spacewatch	HOF	2.3 km	MPC · JPL
528892	2009 DS_{42}	—	February 19, 2009	La Sagra	OAM	H	570 m	MPC · JPL
528893	2009 DW_{46}	—	February 2, 2009	Catalina	CSS	·	1.1 km	MPC · JPL
528894	2009 DR_{47}	—	February 26, 2009	Kitt Peak	Spacewatch	·	3.0 km	MPC · JPL
528895	2009 DF_{48}	—	February 27, 2009	Catalina	CSS	·	1.6 km	MPC · JPL
528896	2009 DA_{49}	—	February 19, 2009	Catalina	CSS	·	2.3 km	MPC · JPL
528897	2009 DF_{51}	—	December 22, 2008	Mount Lemmon	Mount Lemmon Survey	·	2.4 km	MPC · JPL
528898	2009 DR_{52}	—	February 22, 2009	Kitt Peak	Spacewatch	THM	1.6 km	MPC · JPL
528899	2009 DJ_{54}	—	February 1, 2009	Kitt Peak	Spacewatch	·	3.0 km	MPC · JPL
528900	2009 DQ_{54}	—	January 25, 2009	Kitt Peak	Spacewatch	·	1.7 km	MPC · JPL

== 528901–529000 ==
back to top

Designation			Discovery			Properties		Ref
Permanent	Provisional	Named after	Date	Site	Discoverer(s)	Category	Diam.	Ref
528901	2009 DY_{56}	—	February 14, 2009	Kitt Peak	Spacewatch	·	460 m	MPC · JPL
528902	2009 DZ_{58}	—	January 3, 2009	Mount Lemmon	Mount Lemmon Survey	·	1.5 km	MPC · JPL
528903	2009 DR_{61}	—	February 22, 2009	Kitt Peak	Spacewatch	HYG	2.3 km	MPC · JPL
528904	2009 DX_{66}	—	February 3, 2009	Kitt Peak	Spacewatch	·	500 m	MPC · JPL
528905	2009 DQ_{74}	—	February 3, 2009	Mount Lemmon	Mount Lemmon Survey	·	1.8 km	MPC · JPL
528906	2009 DE_{78}	—	February 25, 2009	Catalina	CSS	·	740 m	MPC · JPL
528907	2009 DL_{83}	—	February 24, 2009	Kitt Peak	Spacewatch	V	550 m	MPC · JPL
528908	2009 DN_{88}	—	February 22, 2009	Kitt Peak	Spacewatch	·	2.6 km	MPC · JPL
528909	2009 DS_{94}	—	February 28, 2009	Mount Lemmon	Mount Lemmon Survey	·	1.7 km	MPC · JPL
528910	2009 DG_{96}	—	February 5, 2009	Kitt Peak	Spacewatch	·	1.6 km	MPC · JPL
528911	2009 DT_{102}	—	February 26, 2009	Kitt Peak	Spacewatch	PHO	1.1 km	MPC · JPL
528912	2009 DS_{103}	—	September 10, 2007	Mount Lemmon	Mount Lemmon Survey	·	1.1 km	MPC · JPL
528913	2009 DF_{114}	—	February 19, 2009	Mount Lemmon	Mount Lemmon Survey	V	510 m	MPC · JPL
528914	2009 DZ_{114}	—	February 26, 2009	Kitt Peak	Spacewatch	H	380 m	MPC · JPL
528915	2009 DC_{117}	—	February 27, 2009	Kitt Peak	Spacewatch	·	570 m	MPC · JPL
528916	2009 DN_{122}	—	February 27, 2009	Kitt Peak	Spacewatch	·	2.3 km	MPC · JPL
528917	2009 DE_{124}	—	February 19, 2009	Kitt Peak	Spacewatch	·	1.5 km	MPC · JPL
528918	2009 DK_{131}	—	February 19, 2009	Kitt Peak	Spacewatch	KOR	1.1 km	MPC · JPL
528919	2009 DT_{131}	—	February 19, 2009	Kitt Peak	Spacewatch	·	2.4 km	MPC · JPL
528920	2009 DS_{132}	—	February 22, 2009	Mount Lemmon	Mount Lemmon Survey	·	1.4 km	MPC · JPL
528921	2009 DG_{136}	—	August 29, 2006	Kitt Peak	Spacewatch	·	1.5 km	MPC · JPL
528922	2009 DB_{145}	—	September 13, 2007	Mount Lemmon	Mount Lemmon Survey	·	510 m	MPC · JPL
528923	2009 DF_{146}	—	September 6, 1997	Caussols	ODAS	·	670 m	MPC · JPL
528924	2009 DK_{146}	—	February 19, 2009	Kitt Peak	Spacewatch	EOS	1.6 km	MPC · JPL
528925	2009 DL_{146}	—	February 19, 2009	Mount Lemmon	Mount Lemmon Survey	·	1.1 km	MPC · JPL
528926	2009 DM_{146}	—	February 20, 2009	Kitt Peak	Spacewatch	·	840 m	MPC · JPL
528927	2009 DN_{146}	—	February 21, 2009	Mount Lemmon	Mount Lemmon Survey	·	570 m	MPC · JPL
528928	2009 DP_{146}	—	February 27, 2009	Kitt Peak	Spacewatch	·	730 m	MPC · JPL
528929	2009 EV_{1}	—	February 22, 2009	Kitt Peak	Spacewatch	·	630 m	MPC · JPL
528930	2009 ET_{8}	—	February 4, 2009	Mount Lemmon	Mount Lemmon Survey	AGN	1.3 km	MPC · JPL
528931	2009 EV_{14}	—	February 20, 2009	Kitt Peak	Spacewatch	·	960 m	MPC · JPL
528932	2009 EQ_{20}	—	March 2, 2009	Kitt Peak	Spacewatch	H	410 m	MPC · JPL
528933	2009 EA_{25}	—	February 4, 2009	Mount Lemmon	Mount Lemmon Survey	·	1.6 km	MPC · JPL
528934	2009 EF_{30}	—	March 2, 2009	Mount Lemmon	Mount Lemmon Survey	·	2.0 km	MPC · JPL
528935	2009 EQ_{32}	—	March 3, 2009	Kitt Peak	Spacewatch	·	1.3 km	MPC · JPL
528936	2009 ER_{32}	—	March 2, 2009	Kitt Peak	Spacewatch	EOS	1.4 km	MPC · JPL
528937	2009 ES_{32}	—	March 2, 2009	Kitt Peak	Spacewatch	·	2.7 km	MPC · JPL
528938	2009 ET_{32}	—	March 3, 2009	Kitt Peak	Spacewatch	·	2.6 km	MPC · JPL
528939	2009 FH_{15}	—	February 3, 2009	Kitt Peak	Spacewatch	·	2.7 km	MPC · JPL
528940	2009 FL_{15}	—	March 16, 2009	Mount Lemmon	Mount Lemmon Survey	·	1.3 km	MPC · JPL
528941	2009 FP_{18}	—	September 16, 2006	Kitt Peak	Spacewatch	·	2.4 km	MPC · JPL
528942	2009 FN_{25}	—	March 20, 2009	La Sagra	OAM	EUP	3.4 km	MPC · JPL
528943	2009 FU_{26}	—	March 3, 2009	Catalina	CSS	H	810 m	MPC · JPL
528944	2009 FB_{44}	—	March 25, 2009	Mount Lemmon	Mount Lemmon Survey	TRE	2.1 km	MPC · JPL
528945	2009 FQ_{47}	—	March 28, 2009	Kitt Peak	Spacewatch	·	1.6 km	MPC · JPL
528946	2009 FH_{50}	—	November 17, 2007	Kitt Peak	Spacewatch	·	2.6 km	MPC · JPL
528947	2009 FH_{52}	—	March 28, 2009	Mount Lemmon	Mount Lemmon Survey	·	870 m	MPC · JPL
528948	2009 FG_{54}	—	March 29, 2009	Mount Lemmon	Mount Lemmon Survey	H	420 m	MPC · JPL
528949	2009 FX_{54}	—	March 24, 2009	Mount Lemmon	Mount Lemmon Survey	·	1.6 km	MPC · JPL
528950	2009 FY_{54}	—	March 24, 2009	Mount Lemmon	Mount Lemmon Survey	·	2.0 km	MPC · JPL
528951	2009 FK_{63}	—	September 28, 2006	Kitt Peak	Spacewatch	·	2.5 km	MPC · JPL
528952	2009 FJ_{64}	—	March 31, 2009	Kitt Peak	Spacewatch	·	1.4 km	MPC · JPL
528953	2009 FW_{64}	—	March 16, 2009	Kitt Peak	Spacewatch	·	530 m	MPC · JPL
528954	2009 FG_{65}	—	February 19, 2009	Kitt Peak	Spacewatch	·	1.4 km	MPC · JPL
528955	2009 FY_{68}	—	March 16, 2009	Kitt Peak	Spacewatch	·	1.6 km	MPC · JPL
528956	2009 FB_{71}	—	March 28, 2009	Kitt Peak	Spacewatch	·	550 m	MPC · JPL
528957	2009 FY_{72}	—	March 19, 2009	Mount Lemmon	Mount Lemmon Survey	·	570 m	MPC · JPL
528958	2009 FO_{76}	—	March 29, 2009	Kitt Peak	Spacewatch	·	570 m	MPC · JPL
528959	2009 FR_{79}	—	March 24, 2009	Mount Lemmon	Mount Lemmon Survey	·	2.3 km	MPC · JPL
528960	2009 FA_{80}	—	March 21, 2009	Mount Lemmon	Mount Lemmon Survey	·	1.8 km	MPC · JPL
528961	2009 FG_{80}	—	March 31, 2009	Mount Lemmon	Mount Lemmon Survey	·	1.9 km	MPC · JPL
528962	2009 FR_{81}	—	February 22, 2009	Kitt Peak	Spacewatch	·	740 m	MPC · JPL
528963	2009 FS_{81}	—	March 19, 2009	Kitt Peak	Spacewatch	H	450 m	MPC · JPL
528964	2009 FU_{81}	—	March 29, 2009	Mount Lemmon	Mount Lemmon Survey	·	810 m	MPC · JPL
528965	2009 GD_{6}	—	April 2, 2009	Kitt Peak	Spacewatch	·	1.5 km	MPC · JPL
528966	2009 HZ	—	February 20, 2009	Mount Lemmon	Mount Lemmon Survey	H	510 m	MPC · JPL
528967	2009 HU_{6}	—	March 21, 2009	Catalina	CSS	PHO	840 m	MPC · JPL
528968	2009 HN_{7}	—	March 28, 2009	Kitt Peak	Spacewatch	H	460 m	MPC · JPL
528969	2009 HO_{7}	—	April 17, 2009	Kitt Peak	Spacewatch	H	410 m	MPC · JPL
528970	2009 HU_{7}	—	April 2, 2009	Kitt Peak	Spacewatch	·	590 m	MPC · JPL
528971	2009 HD_{13}	—	March 16, 2009	Kitt Peak	Spacewatch	·	1.9 km	MPC · JPL
528972	2009 HM_{15}	—	March 1, 2009	Kitt Peak	Spacewatch	T_{j} (2.89)	5.4 km	MPC · JPL
528973	2009 HC_{22}	—	April 17, 2009	Kitt Peak	Spacewatch	·	2.9 km	MPC · JPL
528974	2009 HH_{22}	—	March 17, 2009	Kitt Peak	Spacewatch	·	1.9 km	MPC · JPL
528975	2009 HG_{23}	—	September 25, 2006	Kitt Peak	Spacewatch	·	1.7 km	MPC · JPL
528976	2009 HL_{26}	—	April 18, 2009	Kitt Peak	Spacewatch	·	1.3 km	MPC · JPL
528977	2009 HW_{26}	—	March 16, 2009	Kitt Peak	Spacewatch	·	990 m	MPC · JPL
528978	2009 HE_{27}	—	October 4, 2006	Mount Lemmon	Mount Lemmon Survey	·	3.0 km	MPC · JPL
528979	2009 HC_{30}	—	April 19, 2009	Kitt Peak	Spacewatch	V	480 m	MPC · JPL
528980	2009 HP_{37}	—	February 20, 2009	Mount Lemmon	Mount Lemmon Survey	H	510 m	MPC · JPL
528981	2009 HR_{46}	—	April 2, 2009	Mount Lemmon	Mount Lemmon Survey	·	620 m	MPC · JPL
528982	2009 HU_{53}	—	April 20, 2009	Kitt Peak	Spacewatch	·	3.3 km	MPC · JPL
528983	2009 HL_{61}	—	April 20, 2009	Mount Lemmon	Mount Lemmon Survey	·	1.5 km	MPC · JPL
528984	2009 HM_{65}	—	April 23, 2009	Kitt Peak	Spacewatch	·	610 m	MPC · JPL
528985	2009 HO_{67}	—	April 26, 2009	Kitt Peak	Spacewatch	·	1.7 km	MPC · JPL
528986	2009 HA_{69}	—	January 30, 2008	Mount Lemmon	Mount Lemmon Survey	THM	2.1 km	MPC · JPL
528987	2009 HT_{69}	—	April 22, 2009	Mount Lemmon	Mount Lemmon Survey	·	1.0 km	MPC · JPL
528988	2009 HQ_{70}	—	April 2, 2009	Kitt Peak	Spacewatch	·	1.4 km	MPC · JPL
528989	2009 HW_{76}	—	February 4, 2005	Kitt Peak	Spacewatch	·	820 m	MPC · JPL
528990	2009 HX_{78}	—	April 26, 2009	Kitt Peak	Spacewatch	·	530 m	MPC · JPL
528991	2009 HE_{82}	—	April 29, 2009	Mount Lemmon	Mount Lemmon Survey	·	530 m	MPC · JPL
528992	2009 HX_{89}	—	April 22, 2009	Mount Lemmon	Mount Lemmon Survey	·	570 m	MPC · JPL
528993	2009 HE_{91}	—	March 31, 2009	Mount Lemmon	Mount Lemmon Survey	·	2.0 km	MPC · JPL
528994	2009 HM_{93}	—	April 30, 2009	Kitt Peak	Spacewatch	·	3.1 km	MPC · JPL
528995	2009 HU_{100}	—	April 22, 2009	Mount Lemmon	Mount Lemmon Survey	·	630 m	MPC · JPL
528996	2009 HY_{102}	—	April 17, 2009	Kitt Peak	Spacewatch	·	1.3 km	MPC · JPL
528997 Tanakatakenori	2009 HW_{104}	Tanakatakenori	April 20, 2009	Zelenchukskaya Stn	T. V. Krjačko	·	2.0 km	MPC · JPL
528998	2009 HK_{108}	—	October 4, 2006	Mount Lemmon	Mount Lemmon Survey	·	2.1 km	MPC · JPL
528999	2009 HV_{108}	—	April 27, 2009	Mount Lemmon	Mount Lemmon Survey	H	440 m	MPC · JPL
529000	2009 HZ_{108}	—	April 22, 2009	Mount Lemmon	Mount Lemmon Survey	·	2.0 km	MPC · JPL

back to top

== Meaning of names ==
As minor planet discoveries are confirmed, they are given a permanent number by the IAU's Minor Planet Center (MPC), and the discoverers can then submit names for them, following the IAU's naming conventions. The list below concerns those minor planets in the specified number-range that have received names, and explains the meanings of those names.

Official naming citations of newly named small Solar System bodies are approved and published in a bulletin by IAU's Working Group for Small Bodies Nomenclature (WGSBN). Before May 2021, citations were published in MPC's Minor Planet Circulars for many decades. Recent citations can also be found on the JPL Small-Body Database (SBDB). Until his death in 2016, German astronomer Lutz D. Schmadel compiled these citations into the Dictionary of Minor Planet Names (DMP) and regularly updated the collection.

Based on Paul Herget's The Names of the Minor Planets, Schmadel also researched the unclear origin of numerous asteroids, most of which had been named prior to World War II. This article incorporates text from this source, which is in the public domain: SBDB New namings may only be added to this list below after official publication as the preannouncement of names is condemned. The WGSBN publishes a comprehensive guideline for the naming rules of non-cometary small Solar System bodies.

Named minor planet	Provisional	This minor planet was named for...	Ref · Catalog
528489 Ntuef	2008 UW_{54}	The National Taiwan University Experimental Forest was originally established in 1901. It lies in central Taiwan and the terrain rises from 220 meters at the southern bank of Jhuoshuei River to 3952 meters at the peak of Yushan. The forest covers 32770 ha and occupies about 1 percent of Taiwan Island.	IAU · 528489
528997 Tanakatakenori	2009 HW_{104}	Tanaka Takenori (born 1941) is an Honored Sensei of the Japan Shotokai Karate Federation and Honorary President of the Russian Shotokai Karate Federation.	IAU · 528997
