= List of minor planets: 829001–830000 =

The following is a partial list of minor planets, running from minor-planet number 829001 through 830000, inclusive. The primary data for this and other partial lists is based on JPL's "Small-Body Orbital Elements" and data available from the Minor Planet Center. Critical list information is also provided by the MPC, unless otherwise specified from Lowell Observatory. A detailed description of the table's columns and additional sources are given on the main page including a complete list of every page in this series, and a statistical break-up on the dynamical classification of minor planets.

Also see the summary list of all named bodies in numerical and alphabetical order, and the corresponding naming citations for the number range of this particular list. New namings may only be added to this list after official publication, as the preannouncement of names is condemned by the Working Group for Small Bodies Nomenclature of the International Astronomical Union.

Near-Earth obj.	MBA (inner)	MBA (outer)	Centaur
Mars-crosser	MBA (middle)	Jupiter trojan	Trans-Neptunian obj.
Unclassified

== 829001–829100 ==
Designation			Discovery			Properties		Ref
Permanent	Provisional	Named after	Date	Site	Discoverer(s)	Category	Diam.	Ref
829001	2005 UE_{536}	—	October 8, 2012	Kitt Peak	Spacewatch	·	640 m	MPC · JPL
829002	2005 UZ_{536}	—	April 5, 2014	Haleakala	Pan-STARRS 1	·	2.7 km	MPC · JPL
829003	2005 UA_{541}	—	November 13, 2010	Mount Lemmon	Mount Lemmon Survey	·	1.5 km	MPC · JPL
829004	2005 UV_{541}	—	September 19, 2009	Mount Lemmon	Mount Lemmon Survey	·	1.2 km	MPC · JPL
829005	2005 UL_{544}	—	April 25, 2015	Kitt Peak	Spacewatch	MAS	530 m	MPC · JPL
829006	2005 UM_{544}	—	October 24, 2005	Kitt Peak	Spacewatch	EOS	1.3 km	MPC · JPL
829007	2005 UC_{545}	—	October 30, 2005	Kitt Peak	Spacewatch	·	850 m	MPC · JPL
829008	2005 UG_{548}	—	October 28, 2005	Kitt Peak	Spacewatch	EOS	1.2 km	MPC · JPL
829009	2005 UR_{549}	—	October 24, 2005	Kitt Peak	Spacewatch	LIX	2.5 km	MPC · JPL
829010	2005 UJ_{554}	—	October 26, 2005	Kitt Peak	Spacewatch	·	1.8 km	MPC · JPL
829011	2005 UJ_{555}	—	October 25, 2005	Mount Lemmon	Mount Lemmon Survey	·	2.6 km	MPC · JPL
829012	2005 UP_{555}	—	October 27, 2005	Mount Lemmon	Mount Lemmon Survey	·	840 m	MPC · JPL
829013	2005 UB_{556}	—	October 22, 2005	Kitt Peak	Spacewatch	·	800 m	MPC · JPL
829014	2005 VK	—	October 30, 2005	Mount Lemmon	Mount Lemmon Survey	·	460 m	MPC · JPL
829015	2005 VP_{9}	—	October 28, 2005	Kitt Peak	Spacewatch	·	450 m	MPC · JPL
829016	2005 VW_{12}	—	October 27, 2005	Kitt Peak	Spacewatch	·	470 m	MPC · JPL
829017	2005 VJ_{22}	—	November 1, 2005	Kitt Peak	Spacewatch	·	1.5 km	MPC · JPL
829018	2005 VW_{31}	—	October 1, 2005	Mount Lemmon	Mount Lemmon Survey	·	1.1 km	MPC · JPL
829019	2005 VQ_{52}	—	October 25, 2005	Kitt Peak	Spacewatch	·	770 m	MPC · JPL
829020	2005 VC_{54}	—	November 4, 2005	Kitt Peak	Spacewatch	·	880 m	MPC · JPL
829021	2005 VP_{63}	—	October 24, 2005	Kitt Peak	Spacewatch	MAS	560 m	MPC · JPL
829022	2005 VN_{69}	—	November 4, 2005	Mount Lemmon	Mount Lemmon Survey	·	1.9 km	MPC · JPL
829023	2005 VU_{69}	—	November 2, 2005	Mount Lemmon	Mount Lemmon Survey	(5)	980 m	MPC · JPL
829024	2005 VN_{71}	—	November 5, 2005	Mount Lemmon	Mount Lemmon Survey	·	1.1 km	MPC · JPL
829025	2005 VS_{79}	—	September 25, 2005	Kitt Peak	Spacewatch	·	1.6 km	MPC · JPL
829026	2005 VE_{82}	—	October 22, 2005	Kitt Peak	Spacewatch	MAS	650 m	MPC · JPL
829027	2005 VH_{91}	—	November 6, 2005	Kitt Peak	Spacewatch	·	2.4 km	MPC · JPL
829028	2005 VN_{97}	—	September 30, 2005	Mount Lemmon	Mount Lemmon Survey	·	710 m	MPC · JPL
829029	2005 VM_{109}	—	October 29, 2005	Kitt Peak	Spacewatch	·	1.2 km	MPC · JPL
829030	2005 VU_{116}	—	November 11, 2005	Kitt Peak	Spacewatch	·	970 m	MPC · JPL
829031	2005 VV_{120}	—	November 5, 2005	Catalina	CSS	T_{j} (2.99) · EUP	3.1 km	MPC · JPL
829032	2005 VY_{121}	—	October 6, 2005	Mount Lemmon	Mount Lemmon Survey	·	2.2 km	MPC · JPL
829033	2005 VR_{132}	—	October 25, 2005	Apache Point	SDSS Collaboration	·	2.1 km	MPC · JPL
829034	2005 VN_{133}	—	October 25, 2005	Apache Point	SDSS Collaboration	·	1.4 km	MPC · JPL
829035	2005 VP_{137}	—	November 6, 2005	Mount Lemmon	Mount Lemmon Survey	·	2.0 km	MPC · JPL
829036	2005 VA_{138}	—	November 1, 2005	Mount Lemmon	Mount Lemmon Survey	·	860 m	MPC · JPL
829037	2005 VN_{141}	—	October 2, 2013	Haleakala	Pan-STARRS 1	(5)	810 m	MPC · JPL
829038	2005 VF_{142}	—	November 12, 2005	Kitt Peak	Spacewatch	·	810 m	MPC · JPL
829039	2005 VA_{146}	—	September 27, 2009	Kitt Peak	Spacewatch	(5)	580 m	MPC · JPL
829040	2005 VG_{146}	—	November 10, 2005	Kitt Peak	Spacewatch	·	610 m	MPC · JPL
829041	2005 VE_{147}	—	October 1, 2015	Mount Lemmon	Mount Lemmon Survey	·	1.4 km	MPC · JPL
829042	2005 VR_{148}	—	July 19, 2010	WISE	WISE	·	2.2 km	MPC · JPL
829043	2005 VX_{149}	—	September 25, 2012	Mount Lemmon	Mount Lemmon Survey	·	750 m	MPC · JPL
829044	2005 VA_{150}	—	April 13, 2013	Kitt Peak	Spacewatch	·	1.2 km	MPC · JPL
829045	2005 VO_{152}	—	November 4, 2005	Kitt Peak	Spacewatch	EOS	1.4 km	MPC · JPL
829046	2005 VX_{152}	—	November 1, 2005	Mount Lemmon	Mount Lemmon Survey	·	1.2 km	MPC · JPL
829047	2005 VY_{153}	—	November 10, 2005	Mount Lemmon	Mount Lemmon Survey	·	710 m	MPC · JPL
829048	2005 VE_{156}	—	November 6, 2005	Kitt Peak	Spacewatch	·	1.2 km	MPC · JPL
829049	2005 VB_{157}	—	November 1, 2005	Mount Lemmon	Mount Lemmon Survey	·	950 m	MPC · JPL
829050	2005 WV_{29}	—	November 21, 2005	Kitt Peak	Spacewatch	·	2.9 km	MPC · JPL
829051	2005 WM_{35}	—	November 22, 2005	Kitt Peak	Spacewatch	·	660 m	MPC · JPL
829052	2005 WF_{36}	—	November 22, 2005	Kitt Peak	Spacewatch	·	820 m	MPC · JPL
829053	2005 WZ_{41}	—	October 22, 2005	Kitt Peak	Spacewatch	·	530 m	MPC · JPL
829054	2005 WL_{45}	—	November 22, 2005	Kitt Peak	Spacewatch	·	510 m	MPC · JPL
829055	2005 WD_{47}	—	November 25, 2005	Kitt Peak	Spacewatch	EUP	3.3 km	MPC · JPL
829056	2005 WB_{49}	—	November 25, 2005	Kitt Peak	Spacewatch	EOS	1.4 km	MPC · JPL
829057	2005 WN_{61}	—	September 29, 2005	Kitt Peak	Spacewatch	·	520 m	MPC · JPL
829058	2005 WC_{66}	—	October 29, 2005	Mount Lemmon	Mount Lemmon Survey	·	490 m	MPC · JPL
829059	2005 WE_{69}	—	November 25, 2005	Mount Lemmon	Mount Lemmon Survey	·	450 m	MPC · JPL
829060	2005 WZ_{77}	—	November 25, 2005	Kitt Peak	Spacewatch	·	1.4 km	MPC · JPL
829061	2005 WY_{79}	—	November 25, 2005	Kitt Peak	Spacewatch	·	870 m	MPC · JPL
829062	2005 WU_{106}	—	October 29, 2005	Mount Lemmon	Mount Lemmon Survey	·	920 m	MPC · JPL
829063	2005 WC_{107}	—	October 25, 2005	Mount Lemmon	Mount Lemmon Survey	·	480 m	MPC · JPL
829064	2005 WN_{128}	—	November 25, 2005	Mount Lemmon	Mount Lemmon Survey	·	500 m	MPC · JPL
829065	2005 WD_{142}	—	November 29, 2005	Kitt Peak	Spacewatch	·	2.2 km	MPC · JPL
829066	2005 WV_{142}	—	October 25, 2005	Mount Lemmon	Mount Lemmon Survey	NYS	830 m	MPC · JPL
829067	2005 WP_{156}	—	October 27, 2005	Kitt Peak	Spacewatch	·	1.7 km	MPC · JPL
829068	2005 WH_{161}	—	November 28, 2005	Mount Lemmon	Mount Lemmon Survey	·	690 m	MPC · JPL
829069	2005 WH_{188}	—	November 30, 2005	Kitt Peak	Spacewatch	·	770 m	MPC · JPL
829070	2005 WM_{197}	—	October 28, 2005	Mount Lemmon	Mount Lemmon Survey	·	680 m	MPC · JPL
829071	2005 WJ_{204}	—	November 30, 2005	Mount Lemmon	Mount Lemmon Survey	BAR	880 m	MPC · JPL
829072	2005 WD_{213}	—	October 26, 2016	Mount Lemmon	Mount Lemmon Survey	·	2.9 km	MPC · JPL
829073	2005 WD_{214}	—	November 25, 2005	Mount Lemmon	Mount Lemmon Survey	·	910 m	MPC · JPL
829074	2005 WM_{215}	—	March 17, 2015	Haleakala	Pan-STARRS 1	·	660 m	MPC · JPL
829075	2005 WB_{219}	—	November 28, 2005	Kitt Peak	Spacewatch	·	2.7 km	MPC · JPL
829076	2005 XM_{5}	—	November 9, 2005	Kitt Peak	Spacewatch	HNS	900 m	MPC · JPL
829077	2005 XJ_{9}	—	October 28, 2005	Mount Lemmon	Mount Lemmon Survey	·	2.0 km	MPC · JPL
829078	2005 XL_{17}	—	December 1, 2005	Kitt Peak	Spacewatch	·	920 m	MPC · JPL
829079	2005 XF_{21}	—	October 26, 2005	Kitt Peak	Spacewatch	·	440 m	MPC · JPL
829080	2005 XP_{57}	—	October 27, 2005	Mount Lemmon	Mount Lemmon Survey	EUN	850 m	MPC · JPL
829081	2005 XS_{69}	—	December 6, 2005	Kitt Peak	Spacewatch	·	490 m	MPC · JPL
829082	2005 XV_{85}	—	December 2, 2005	Kitt Peak	Spacewatch	·	850 m	MPC · JPL
829083	2005 XW_{89}	—	December 8, 2005	Kitt Peak	Spacewatch	·	1.1 km	MPC · JPL
829084	2005 XF_{91}	—	December 10, 2005	Kitt Peak	Spacewatch	JUN	730 m	MPC · JPL
829085	2005 XG_{96}	—	December 1, 2005	Kitt Peak	L. H. Wasserman, R. L. Millis	·	1.2 km	MPC · JPL
829086	2005 XR_{98}	—	December 1, 2005	Kitt Peak	L. H. Wasserman, R. L. Millis	·	800 m	MPC · JPL
829087	2005 XD_{100}	—	October 10, 2005	Kitt Peak	Spacewatch	HYG	1.8 km	MPC · JPL
829088	2005 XG_{107}	—	December 3, 2005	Mauna Kea	A. Boattini	L5	7.3 km	MPC · JPL
829089	2005 XO_{114}	—	August 14, 2012	Haleakala	Pan-STARRS 1	MAS	590 m	MPC · JPL
829090	2005 XW_{121}	—	January 25, 2012	Haleakala	Pan-STARRS 1	EUP	2.7 km	MPC · JPL
829091	2005 XP_{122}	—	May 9, 2013	Haleakala	Pan-STARRS 1	·	1.7 km	MPC · JPL
829092	2005 XS_{122}	—	October 28, 2013	Mount Lemmon	Mount Lemmon Survey	·	590 m	MPC · JPL
829093	2005 XJ_{123}	—	October 25, 2011	Haleakala	Pan-STARRS 1	EMA	2.0 km	MPC · JPL
829094	2005 XL_{123}	—	December 10, 2005	Kitt Peak	Spacewatch	·	2.4 km	MPC · JPL
829095	2005 XX_{123}	—	November 11, 2013	Mount Lemmon	Mount Lemmon Survey	·	1.0 km	MPC · JPL
829096	2005 XL_{124}	—	July 23, 2010	WISE	WISE	LUT	3.3 km	MPC · JPL
829097	2005 XX_{124}	—	December 2, 2005	Kitt Peak	L. H. Wasserman, R. L. Millis	EUN	760 m	MPC · JPL
829098	2005 XZ_{124}	—	December 4, 2005	Kitt Peak	Spacewatch	·	2.1 km	MPC · JPL
829099	2005 XE_{127}	—	February 5, 2011	Haleakala	Pan-STARRS 1	·	1.1 km	MPC · JPL
829100	2005 XT_{129}	—	December 5, 2005	Mount Lemmon	Mount Lemmon Survey	·	990 m	MPC · JPL

== 829101–829200 ==
back to top

Designation			Discovery			Properties		Ref
Permanent	Provisional	Named after	Date	Site	Discoverer(s)	Category	Diam.	Ref
829101	2005 XS_{135}	—	December 4, 2005	Kitt Peak	Spacewatch	·	720 m	MPC · JPL
829102	2005 XW_{135}	—	December 6, 2005	Kitt Peak	Spacewatch	PHO	970 m	MPC · JPL
829103	2005 XK_{136}	—	December 10, 2005	Kitt Peak	Spacewatch	·	940 m	MPC · JPL
829104	2005 YG_{3}	—	December 22, 2005	Kitt Peak	Spacewatch	·	2.5 km	MPC · JPL
829105	2005 YM_{10}	—	November 25, 2005	Mount Lemmon	Mount Lemmon Survey	DOR	1.8 km	MPC · JPL
829106	2005 YB_{15}	—	December 22, 2005	Kitt Peak	Spacewatch	·	2.6 km	MPC · JPL
829107	2005 YO_{21}	—	December 24, 2005	Kitt Peak	Spacewatch	·	780 m	MPC · JPL
829108	2005 YM_{25}	—	December 24, 2005	Kitt Peak	Spacewatch	PHO	780 m	MPC · JPL
829109	2005 YG_{57}	—	December 24, 2005	Kitt Peak	Spacewatch	·	610 m	MPC · JPL
829110	2005 YJ_{59}	—	December 26, 2005	Mount Lemmon	Mount Lemmon Survey	·	520 m	MPC · JPL
829111	2005 YM_{63}	—	December 24, 2005	Kitt Peak	Spacewatch	THM	1.9 km	MPC · JPL
829112	2005 YH_{68}	—	December 26, 2005	Kitt Peak	Spacewatch	NYS	790 m	MPC · JPL
829113	2005 YJ_{78}	—	December 24, 2005	Kitt Peak	Spacewatch	·	2.4 km	MPC · JPL
829114	2005 YF_{87}	—	December 1, 2005	Mount Lemmon	Mount Lemmon Survey	H	440 m	MPC · JPL
829115	2005 YE_{88}	—	December 2, 2005	Mount Lemmon	Mount Lemmon Survey	·	1.9 km	MPC · JPL
829116	2005 YY_{88}	—	December 25, 2005	Mount Lemmon	Mount Lemmon Survey	·	940 m	MPC · JPL
829117	2005 YZ_{88}	—	December 25, 2005	Mount Lemmon	Mount Lemmon Survey	HNS	870 m	MPC · JPL
829118	2005 YG_{95}	—	March 21, 1999	Sacramento Peak	SDSS	·	930 m	MPC · JPL
829119	2005 YB_{100}	—	December 28, 2005	Kitt Peak	Spacewatch	·	1.4 km	MPC · JPL
829120	2005 YR_{121}	—	November 30, 2005	Mount Lemmon	Mount Lemmon Survey	·	2.6 km	MPC · JPL
829121	2005 YG_{139}	—	December 28, 2005	Kitt Peak	Spacewatch	·	1.0 km	MPC · JPL
829122	2005 YU_{150}	—	December 25, 2005	Kitt Peak	Spacewatch	·	1.3 km	MPC · JPL
829123	2005 YT_{154}	—	December 29, 2005	Kitt Peak	Spacewatch	·	1.7 km	MPC · JPL
829124	2005 YG_{160}	—	December 27, 2005	Kitt Peak	Spacewatch	JUN	870 m	MPC · JPL
829125	2005 YE_{169}	—	December 30, 2005	Kitt Peak	Spacewatch	·	910 m	MPC · JPL
829126	2005 YG_{177}	—	December 22, 2005	Kitt Peak	Spacewatch	·	1.4 km	MPC · JPL
829127	2005 YL_{177}	—	December 24, 2005	Kitt Peak	Spacewatch	H	350 m	MPC · JPL
829128	2005 YH_{188}	—	December 28, 2005	Kitt Peak	Spacewatch	H	360 m	MPC · JPL
829129	2005 YH_{189}	—	December 25, 2005	Kitt Peak	Spacewatch	·	1.2 km	MPC · JPL
829130	2005 YU_{189}	—	December 4, 2005	Kitt Peak	Spacewatch	URS	2.6 km	MPC · JPL
829131	2005 YV_{194}	—	December 31, 2005	Kitt Peak	Spacewatch	·	410 m	MPC · JPL
829132	2005 YD_{195}	—	December 31, 2005	Kitt Peak	Spacewatch	·	2.3 km	MPC · JPL
829133	2005 YU_{204}	—	December 25, 2005	Kitt Peak	Spacewatch	·	940 m	MPC · JPL
829134	2005 YF_{217}	—	December 30, 2005	Kitt Peak	Spacewatch	·	1.9 km	MPC · JPL
829135	2005 YE_{220}	—	December 21, 2005	Mauna Kea	Pittichová, J.	EOS	1.5 km	MPC · JPL
829136	2005 YD_{235}	—	December 28, 2005	Mount Lemmon	Mount Lemmon Survey	·	1.7 km	MPC · JPL
829137	2005 YM_{240}	—	December 29, 2005	Mount Lemmon	Mount Lemmon Survey	·	1.2 km	MPC · JPL
829138	2005 YR_{244}	—	December 5, 2005	Mount Lemmon	Mount Lemmon Survey	EOS	1.4 km	MPC · JPL
829139	2005 YG_{256}	—	December 30, 2005	Kitt Peak	Spacewatch	·	2.6 km	MPC · JPL
829140	2005 YP_{260}	—	December 24, 2005	Kitt Peak	Spacewatch	·	1.7 km	MPC · JPL
829141	2005 YK_{269}	—	December 25, 2005	Mount Lemmon	Mount Lemmon Survey	·	2.9 km	MPC · JPL
829142	2005 YA_{272}	—	December 29, 2005	Kitt Peak	Spacewatch	HNS	660 m	MPC · JPL
829143	2005 YS_{274}	—	December 30, 2005	Kitt Peak	Spacewatch	H	360 m	MPC · JPL
829144	2005 YM_{275}	—	December 5, 2005	Mount Lemmon	Mount Lemmon Survey	·	1.9 km	MPC · JPL
829145	2005 YY_{278}	—	December 5, 2005	Kitt Peak	Spacewatch	·	2.1 km	MPC · JPL
829146	2005 YF_{284}	—	December 28, 2005	Mount Lemmon	Mount Lemmon Survey	·	2.2 km	MPC · JPL
829147	2005 YD_{295}	—	December 25, 2005	Kitt Peak	Spacewatch	·	910 m	MPC · JPL
829148	2005 YQ_{295}	—	December 30, 2005	Kitt Peak	Spacewatch	·	3.1 km	MPC · JPL
829149	2005 YQ_{297}	—	September 28, 2014	Haleakala	Pan-STARRS 1	BRA	960 m	MPC · JPL
829150	2005 YA_{298}	—	November 21, 2017	Haleakala	Pan-STARRS 1	HNS	1.0 km	MPC · JPL
829151	2006 AM_{9}	—	October 29, 2005	Kitt Peak	Spacewatch	·	1.6 km	MPC · JPL
829152	2006 AT_{17}	—	December 25, 2005	Mount Lemmon	Mount Lemmon Survey	THM	1.8 km	MPC · JPL
829153	2006 AZ_{47}	—	January 7, 2006	Mount Lemmon	Mount Lemmon Survey	·	2.3 km	MPC · JPL
829154	2006 AV_{58}	—	December 26, 2005	Mount Lemmon	Mount Lemmon Survey	·	1.5 km	MPC · JPL
829155	2006 AK_{61}	—	January 5, 2006	Kitt Peak	Spacewatch	NYS	640 m	MPC · JPL
829156	2006 AH_{66}	—	January 9, 2006	Kitt Peak	Spacewatch	·	720 m	MPC · JPL
829157	2006 AY_{66}	—	January 9, 2006	Kitt Peak	Spacewatch	·	1.1 km	MPC · JPL
829158	2006 AS_{75}	—	January 4, 2006	Kitt Peak	Spacewatch	·	1.2 km	MPC · JPL
829159	2006 AK_{88}	—	January 5, 2006	Kitt Peak	Spacewatch	·	980 m	MPC · JPL
829160	2006 AQ_{88}	—	January 5, 2006	Kitt Peak	Spacewatch	·	1.2 km	MPC · JPL
829161	2006 AN_{95}	—	January 9, 2006	Kitt Peak	Spacewatch	EOS	1.4 km	MPC · JPL
829162	2006 AH_{111}	—	January 5, 2006	Kitt Peak	Spacewatch	·	890 m	MPC · JPL
829163	2006 AL_{112}	—	March 10, 2015	Mount Lemmon	Mount Lemmon Survey	EUN	900 m	MPC · JPL
829164	2006 AQ_{112}	—	September 12, 2017	Haleakala	Pan-STARRS 1	HNS	920 m	MPC · JPL
829165	2006 AD_{115}	—	January 6, 2006	Mount Lemmon	Mount Lemmon Survey	MAR	810 m	MPC · JPL
829166	2006 AS_{116}	—	January 7, 2006	Kitt Peak	Spacewatch	V	410 m	MPC · JPL
829167	2006 AU_{116}	—	January 6, 2006	Kitt Peak	Spacewatch	·	730 m	MPC · JPL
829168	2006 AB_{118}	—	January 5, 2006	Kitt Peak	Spacewatch	·	1.1 km	MPC · JPL
829169	2006 BB	—	January 18, 2006	Catalina	CSS	·	1.0 km	MPC · JPL
829170	2006 BF_{4}	—	January 21, 2006	Kitt Peak	Spacewatch	·	770 m	MPC · JPL
829171	2006 BD_{13}	—	January 21, 2006	Mount Lemmon	Mount Lemmon Survey	·	1.2 km	MPC · JPL
829172	2006 BK_{25}	—	January 5, 2006	Kitt Peak	Spacewatch	·	2.4 km	MPC · JPL
829173	2006 BA_{28}	—	January 22, 2006	Mount Lemmon	Mount Lemmon Survey	·	1 km	MPC · JPL
829174	2006 BN_{35}	—	January 23, 2006	Kitt Peak	Spacewatch	·	540 m	MPC · JPL
829175	2006 BD_{49}	—	January 7, 2006	Kitt Peak	Spacewatch	3:2	3.4 km	MPC · JPL
829176	2006 BR_{51}	—	January 25, 2006	Kitt Peak	Spacewatch	·	1.9 km	MPC · JPL
829177	2006 BQ_{56}	—	January 22, 2006	Mount Lemmon	Mount Lemmon Survey	·	1.7 km	MPC · JPL
829178	2006 BA_{67}	—	January 23, 2006	Kitt Peak	Spacewatch	·	780 m	MPC · JPL
829179	2006 BL_{78}	—	January 23, 2006	Mount Lemmon	Mount Lemmon Survey	·	890 m	MPC · JPL
829180	2006 BW_{83}	—	January 25, 2006	Kitt Peak	Spacewatch	·	960 m	MPC · JPL
829181	2006 BH_{86}	—	January 25, 2006	Kitt Peak	Spacewatch	T_{j} (2.98) · 3:2 · (6124)	3.5 km	MPC · JPL
829182	2006 BC_{90}	—	January 25, 2006	Kitt Peak	Spacewatch	·	1.2 km	MPC · JPL
829183	2006 BJ_{92}	—	January 26, 2006	Kitt Peak	Spacewatch	·	1.8 km	MPC · JPL
829184	2006 BR_{107}	—	January 7, 2006	Mount Lemmon	Mount Lemmon Survey	·	1.6 km	MPC · JPL
829185	2006 BD_{109}	—	January 25, 2006	Kitt Peak	Spacewatch	·	450 m	MPC · JPL
829186	2006 BW_{116}	—	January 26, 2006	Kitt Peak	Spacewatch	·	960 m	MPC · JPL
829187	2006 BO_{118}	—	January 26, 2006	Kitt Peak	Spacewatch	ERI	1.2 km	MPC · JPL
829188	2006 BR_{126}	—	January 26, 2006	Kitt Peak	Spacewatch	·	930 m	MPC · JPL
829189	2006 BN_{127}	—	January 26, 2006	Kitt Peak	Spacewatch	THM	1.9 km	MPC · JPL
829190	2006 BA_{128}	—	January 26, 2006	Kitt Peak	Spacewatch	·	830 m	MPC · JPL
829191	2006 BT_{139}	—	January 29, 2006	Kitt Peak	Spacewatch	·	770 m	MPC · JPL
829192	2006 BN_{171}	—	January 27, 2006	Kitt Peak	Spacewatch	·	1.2 km	MPC · JPL
829193	2006 BS_{177}	—	January 27, 2006	Mount Lemmon	Mount Lemmon Survey	·	910 m	MPC · JPL
829194	2006 BP_{180}	—	January 27, 2006	Mount Lemmon	Mount Lemmon Survey	·	1.0 km	MPC · JPL
829195	2006 BW_{189}	—	January 28, 2006	Kitt Peak	Spacewatch	PHO	570 m	MPC · JPL
829196	2006 BM_{198}	—	January 30, 2006	Kitt Peak	Spacewatch	LUT	2.9 km	MPC · JPL
829197	2006 BK_{201}	—	January 31, 2006	Kitt Peak	Spacewatch	·	2.2 km	MPC · JPL
829198	2006 BP_{201}	—	January 31, 2006	Kitt Peak	Spacewatch	·	1.2 km	MPC · JPL
829199	2006 BT_{221}	—	January 30, 2006	Kitt Peak	Spacewatch	·	1.2 km	MPC · JPL
829200	2006 BH_{228}	—	January 23, 2006	Kitt Peak	Spacewatch	·	890 m	MPC · JPL

== 829201–829300 ==
back to top

Designation			Discovery			Properties		Ref
Permanent	Provisional	Named after	Date	Site	Discoverer(s)	Category	Diam.	Ref
829201	2006 BJ_{229}	—	January 23, 2006	Kitt Peak	Spacewatch	·	440 m	MPC · JPL
829202	2006 BR_{232}	—	January 31, 2006	Kitt Peak	Spacewatch	·	2.1 km	MPC · JPL
829203	2006 BR_{235}	—	January 31, 2006	Kitt Peak	Spacewatch	·	1.0 km	MPC · JPL
829204	2006 BQ_{238}	—	July 26, 2011	Haleakala	Pan-STARRS 1	·	1.1 km	MPC · JPL
829205	2006 BY_{239}	—	January 31, 2006	Kitt Peak	Spacewatch	KOR	1.1 km	MPC · JPL
829206	2006 BN_{240}	—	January 31, 2006	Kitt Peak	Spacewatch	HNS	650 m	MPC · JPL
829207	2006 BO_{265}	—	January 31, 2006	Kitt Peak	Spacewatch	·	2.5 km	MPC · JPL
829208	2006 BJ_{273}	—	December 25, 2005	Kitt Peak	Spacewatch	·	630 m	MPC · JPL
829209	2006 BL_{278}	—	January 22, 2006	Mount Lemmon	Mount Lemmon Survey	·	2.5 km	MPC · JPL
829210	2006 BR_{279}	—	January 28, 2006	Mount Lemmon	Mount Lemmon Survey	MIS	1.9 km	MPC · JPL
829211	2006 BH_{281}	—	January 31, 2006	Kitt Peak	Spacewatch	·	2.3 km	MPC · JPL
829212	2006 BD_{288}	—	January 26, 2006	Kitt Peak	Spacewatch	H	350 m	MPC · JPL
829213	2006 BZ_{288}	—	January 23, 2006	Kitt Peak	Spacewatch	·	2.5 km	MPC · JPL
829214	2006 BW_{289}	—	June 8, 2010	WISE	WISE	·	2.2 km	MPC · JPL
829215	2006 BE_{294}	—	March 21, 2017	Haleakala	Pan-STARRS 1	·	790 m	MPC · JPL
829216	2006 BE_{295}	—	January 28, 2006	Mount Lemmon	Mount Lemmon Survey	·	1.1 km	MPC · JPL
829217	2006 BV_{296}	—	January 30, 2006	Kitt Peak	Spacewatch	·	510 m	MPC · JPL
829218	2006 BQ_{299}	—	January 30, 2006	Kitt Peak	Spacewatch	·	1.8 km	MPC · JPL
829219	2006 BL_{302}	—	January 27, 2006	Mount Lemmon	Mount Lemmon Survey	·	1.2 km	MPC · JPL
829220	2006 BM_{302}	—	January 23, 2006	Mount Lemmon	Mount Lemmon Survey	HYG	1.9 km	MPC · JPL
829221	2006 BN_{302}	—	January 31, 2006	Kitt Peak	Spacewatch	·	2.1 km	MPC · JPL
829222	2006 BS_{304}	—	January 31, 2006	Kitt Peak	Spacewatch	L5	5.3 km	MPC · JPL
829223	2006 CT	—	February 2, 2006	Kitt Peak	Spacewatch	APO	120 m	MPC · JPL
829224	2006 CJ_{26}	—	February 2, 2006	Kitt Peak	Spacewatch	ARM	2.5 km	MPC · JPL
829225	2006 CQ_{64}	—	February 2, 2006	Mauna Kea	P. A. Wiegert	PHO	860 m	MPC · JPL
829226	2006 CC_{73}	—	February 3, 2006	Mauna Kea	P. A. Wiegert, R. Rasmussen	·	880 m	MPC · JPL
829227	2006 CX_{78}	—	January 26, 2006	Mount Lemmon	Mount Lemmon Survey	·	1.1 km	MPC · JPL
829228	2006 CU_{79}	—	February 3, 2006	Mauna Kea	P. A. Wiegert, R. Rasmussen	·	1.5 km	MPC · JPL
829229	2006 CH_{81}	—	February 1, 2006	Kitt Peak	Spacewatch	·	1.3 km	MPC · JPL
829230	2006 CJ_{81}	—	February 1, 2006	Kitt Peak	Spacewatch	H	410 m	MPC · JPL
829231	2006 CN_{83}	—	February 4, 2006	Kitt Peak	Spacewatch	·	2.4 km	MPC · JPL
829232	2006 CT_{83}	—	February 1, 2006	Kitt Peak	Spacewatch	THB	2.1 km	MPC · JPL
829233	2006 CD_{88}	—	August 30, 2014	Haleakala	Pan-STARRS 1	·	1.5 km	MPC · JPL
829234	2006 CN_{89}	—	November 17, 2009	Mount Lemmon	Mount Lemmon Survey	·	1.2 km	MPC · JPL
829235	2006 CC_{90}	—	January 2, 2011	Mount Lemmon	Mount Lemmon Survey	·	1.1 km	MPC · JPL
829236	2006 CO_{91}	—	February 4, 2006	Mount Lemmon	Mount Lemmon Survey	·	1.9 km	MPC · JPL
829237	2006 DQ	—	February 21, 2006	Mayhill	Lowe, A.	·	2.4 km	MPC · JPL
829238	2006 DL_{5}	—	February 1, 2006	Kitt Peak	Spacewatch	·	1.3 km	MPC · JPL
829239	2006 DJ_{11}	—	February 1, 2006	Kitt Peak	Spacewatch	·	1.6 km	MPC · JPL
829240	2006 DM_{18}	—	February 1, 2006	Kitt Peak	Spacewatch	·	870 m	MPC · JPL
829241	2006 DE_{19}	—	February 4, 2006	Kitt Peak	Spacewatch	·	2.3 km	MPC · JPL
829242	2006 DL_{27}	—	February 20, 2006	Kitt Peak	Spacewatch	PHO	550 m	MPC · JPL
829243	2006 DS_{33}	—	February 20, 2006	Kitt Peak	Spacewatch	·	870 m	MPC · JPL
829244	2006 DT_{53}	—	February 24, 2006	Mount Lemmon	Mount Lemmon Survey	·	1.1 km	MPC · JPL
829245	2006 DA_{56}	—	February 24, 2006	Mount Lemmon	Mount Lemmon Survey	L5	7.2 km	MPC · JPL
829246	2006 DB_{71}	—	February 21, 2006	Mount Lemmon	Mount Lemmon Survey	·	2.1 km	MPC · JPL
829247	2006 DW_{92}	—	February 24, 2006	Kitt Peak	Spacewatch	·	1.0 km	MPC · JPL
829248	2006 DC_{106}	—	February 25, 2006	Mount Lemmon	Mount Lemmon Survey	HNS	710 m	MPC · JPL
829249	2006 DF_{128}	—	January 26, 2006	Mount Lemmon	Mount Lemmon Survey	·	1.6 km	MPC · JPL
829250	2006 DD_{137}	—	February 25, 2006	Kitt Peak	Spacewatch	TIR	2.0 km	MPC · JPL
829251	2006 DO_{140}	—	February 25, 2006	Kitt Peak	Spacewatch	·	2.7 km	MPC · JPL
829252	2006 DV_{159}	—	February 27, 2006	Kitt Peak	Spacewatch	·	1.7 km	MPC · JPL
829253	2006 DH_{162}	—	February 27, 2006	Mount Lemmon	Mount Lemmon Survey	·	1.3 km	MPC · JPL
829254	2006 DT_{162}	—	February 27, 2006	Mount Lemmon	Mount Lemmon Survey	·	1.1 km	MPC · JPL
829255	2006 DC_{165}	—	February 27, 2006	Kitt Peak	Spacewatch	·	550 m	MPC · JPL
829256	2006 DE_{194}	—	February 28, 2006	Mount Lemmon	Mount Lemmon Survey	HNS	750 m	MPC · JPL
829257	2006 DV_{200}	—	February 25, 2006	Catalina	CSS	·	2.1 km	MPC · JPL
829258	2006 DZ_{206}	—	February 25, 2006	Mount Lemmon	Mount Lemmon Survey	·	1.2 km	MPC · JPL
829259	2006 DT_{214}	—	March 20, 1999	Sacramento Peak	SDSS	·	510 m	MPC · JPL
829260	2006 DJ_{223}	—	February 16, 2015	Haleakala	Pan-STARRS 1	·	1.1 km	MPC · JPL
829261	2006 DP_{223}	—	January 30, 2017	Kitt Peak	Spacewatch	L5	6.1 km	MPC · JPL
829262	2006 DU_{224}	—	February 27, 2006	Kitt Peak	Spacewatch	·	750 m	MPC · JPL
829263	2006 EZ_{2}	—	January 31, 2006	Kitt Peak	Spacewatch	·	560 m	MPC · JPL
829264	2006 EV_{3}	—	December 19, 2001	Kitt Peak	Spacewatch	·	810 m	MPC · JPL
829265	2006 ED_{6}	—	January 31, 2006	Kitt Peak	Spacewatch	THM	1.5 km	MPC · JPL
829266	2006 EP_{10}	—	March 2, 2006	Kitt Peak	Spacewatch	·	1.1 km	MPC · JPL
829267	2006 EN_{35}	—	March 3, 2006	Kitt Peak	Spacewatch	·	520 m	MPC · JPL
829268	2006 ET_{36}	—	February 2, 2006	Mount Lemmon	Mount Lemmon Survey	·	490 m	MPC · JPL
829269	2006 EH_{39}	—	February 25, 2006	Kitt Peak	Spacewatch	·	2.5 km	MPC · JPL
829270	2006 EJ_{45}	—	March 2, 2006	Kitt Peak	Spacewatch	·	2.3 km	MPC · JPL
829271	2006 ED_{49}	—	March 4, 2006	Kitt Peak	Spacewatch	·	900 m	MPC · JPL
829272	2006 EQ_{52}	—	March 5, 2006	Kitt Peak	Spacewatch	·	750 m	MPC · JPL
829273	2006 ES_{52}	—	March 5, 2006	Mount Lemmon	Mount Lemmon Survey	GEF	850 m	MPC · JPL
829274	2006 EE_{55}	—	January 28, 2006	Mount Lemmon	Mount Lemmon Survey	·	660 m	MPC · JPL
829275	2006 EW_{60}	—	March 5, 2006	Kitt Peak	Spacewatch	·	2.0 km	MPC · JPL
829276	2006 EH_{61}	—	March 5, 2006	Kitt Peak	Spacewatch	·	1.9 km	MPC · JPL
829277	2006 EB_{64}	—	March 5, 2006	Kitt Peak	Spacewatch	·	1.6 km	MPC · JPL
829278	2006 EW_{77}	—	March 5, 2006	Kitt Peak	Spacewatch	·	1.2 km	MPC · JPL
829279	2006 EU_{80}	—	January 18, 2010	WISE	WISE	PHO	700 m	MPC · JPL
829280	2006 EN_{81}	—	September 23, 2011	Haleakala	Pan-STARRS 1	·	460 m	MPC · JPL
829281	2006 EE_{82}	—	March 6, 2006	Kitt Peak	Spacewatch	·	2.4 km	MPC · JPL
829282	2006 EM_{82}	—	March 2, 2006	Kitt Peak	L. H. Wasserman, R. L. Millis	LUT	3.5 km	MPC · JPL
829283	2006 FE_{9}	—	March 23, 2006	Mount Lemmon	Mount Lemmon Survey	·	1.3 km	MPC · JPL
829284	2006 FF_{9}	—	March 23, 2006	Siding Spring	SSS	·	2.7 km	MPC · JPL
829285	2006 FO_{22}	—	December 1, 2005	Kitt Peak	L. H. Wasserman, R. L. Millis	·	890 m	MPC · JPL
829286	2006 FU_{22}	—	March 24, 2006	Mount Lemmon	Mount Lemmon Survey	MAS	570 m	MPC · JPL
829287	2006 FR_{25}	—	February 22, 2006	Mount Lemmon	Mount Lemmon Survey	PHO	820 m	MPC · JPL
829288	2006 FL_{29}	—	March 24, 2006	Mount Lemmon	Mount Lemmon Survey	·	1.2 km	MPC · JPL
829289	2006 FC_{54}	—	March 25, 2006	Kitt Peak	Spacewatch	·	1.1 km	MPC · JPL
829290	2006 FE_{56}	—	March 26, 2006	Mount Lemmon	Mount Lemmon Survey	·	2.5 km	MPC · JPL
829291	2006 FF_{56}	—	March 26, 2006	Mount Lemmon	Mount Lemmon Survey	·	880 m	MPC · JPL
829292	2006 FN_{57}	—	October 10, 2015	Haleakala	Pan-STARRS 1	·	2.3 km	MPC · JPL
829293	2006 FT_{57}	—	February 25, 2011	Mount Lemmon	Mount Lemmon Survey	·	1.6 km	MPC · JPL
829294	2006 FA_{59}	—	April 18, 2015	Kitt Peak	Spacewatch	JUN	660 m	MPC · JPL
829295	2006 FP_{60}	—	March 25, 2006	Kitt Peak	Spacewatch	·	760 m	MPC · JPL
829296	2006 GR_{13}	—	April 2, 2006	Kitt Peak	Spacewatch	·	1.0 km	MPC · JPL
829297	2006 GX_{19}	—	April 2, 2006	Kitt Peak	Spacewatch	·	1.2 km	MPC · JPL
829298	2006 GN_{27}	—	April 2, 2006	Kitt Peak	Spacewatch	·	2.7 km	MPC · JPL
829299	2006 GY_{47}	—	March 25, 2006	Kitt Peak	Spacewatch	·	2.2 km	MPC · JPL
829300	2006 GD_{56}	—	April 7, 2006	Kitt Peak	Spacewatch	PHO	720 m	MPC · JPL

== 829301–829400 ==
back to top

Designation			Discovery			Properties		Ref
Permanent	Provisional	Named after	Date	Site	Discoverer(s)	Category	Diam.	Ref
829301	2006 GN_{58}	—	January 26, 2011	Mount Lemmon	Mount Lemmon Survey	·	2.2 km	MPC · JPL
829302	2006 GJ_{59}	—	April 2, 2006	Kitt Peak	Spacewatch	NYS	830 m	MPC · JPL
829303	2006 GV_{59}	—	April 2, 2006	Kitt Peak	Spacewatch	·	1.1 km	MPC · JPL
829304	2006 HP	—	January 22, 2002	Kitt Peak	Spacewatch	NYS	650 m	MPC · JPL
829305	2006 HQ	—	March 24, 2006	Kitt Peak	Spacewatch	·	1.2 km	MPC · JPL
829306	2006 HN_{14}	—	April 19, 2006	Mount Lemmon	Mount Lemmon Survey	MAS	540 m	MPC · JPL
829307	2006 HT_{64}	—	April 24, 2006	Kitt Peak	Spacewatch	·	1.1 km	MPC · JPL
829308	2006 HO_{66}	—	April 24, 2006	Kitt Peak	Spacewatch	·	1.2 km	MPC · JPL
829309	2006 HM_{71}	—	April 25, 2006	Kitt Peak	Spacewatch	·	1.0 km	MPC · JPL
829310	2006 HT_{113}	—	April 25, 2006	Kitt Peak	Spacewatch	·	2.3 km	MPC · JPL
829311	2006 HZ_{128}	—	April 26, 2006	Cerro Tololo	Deep Ecliptic Survey	·	1.2 km	MPC · JPL
829312	2006 HA_{134}	—	April 26, 2006	Cerro Tololo	Deep Ecliptic Survey	·	2.0 km	MPC · JPL
829313	2006 HH_{142}	—	April 27, 2006	Cerro Tololo	Deep Ecliptic Survey	·	1.4 km	MPC · JPL
829314	2006 HF_{149}	—	April 27, 2006	Cerro Tololo	Deep Ecliptic Survey	THB	1.9 km	MPC · JPL
829315	2006 HM_{156}	—	February 25, 2011	Mount Lemmon	Mount Lemmon Survey	·	1.9 km	MPC · JPL
829316	2006 HY_{157}	—	September 14, 2007	Mount Lemmon	Mount Lemmon Survey	V	480 m	MPC · JPL
829317	2006 HZ_{157}	—	March 2, 2010	WISE	WISE	·	3.0 km	MPC · JPL
829318	2006 HK_{158}	—	April 20, 2006	Kitt Peak	Spacewatch	·	1.1 km	MPC · JPL
829319	2006 HW_{160}	—	April 21, 2006	Kitt Peak	Spacewatch	·	1.3 km	MPC · JPL
829320	2006 HH_{161}	—	April 24, 2006	Kitt Peak	Spacewatch	·	1.8 km	MPC · JPL
829321	2006 HP_{161}	—	April 30, 2006	Kitt Peak	Spacewatch	AGN	840 m	MPC · JPL
829322	2006 JL_{7}	—	May 1, 2006	Kitt Peak	Spacewatch	KON	1.9 km	MPC · JPL
829323	2006 JH_{9}	—	May 1, 2006	Kitt Peak	Spacewatch	·	1.1 km	MPC · JPL
829324	2006 JP_{24}	—	May 4, 2006	Mount Lemmon	Mount Lemmon Survey	·	1.1 km	MPC · JPL
829325	2006 JE_{26}	—	April 29, 2006	Siding Spring	SSS	·	2.2 km	MPC · JPL
829326	2006 JV_{49}	—	May 2, 2006	Mount Lemmon	Mount Lemmon Survey	·	2.0 km	MPC · JPL
829327	2006 JE_{60}	—	May 1, 2006	Kitt Peak	Deep Ecliptic Survey	·	2.1 km	MPC · JPL
829328	2006 JC_{68}	—	May 19, 2006	Mount Lemmon	Mount Lemmon Survey	·	1.1 km	MPC · JPL
829329	2006 JM_{74}	—	September 26, 2003	Sacramento Peak	SDSS	MAS	640 m	MPC · JPL
829330	2006 JQ_{82}	—	May 8, 2006	Mount Lemmon	Mount Lemmon Survey	·	2.3 km	MPC · JPL
829331	2006 JL_{83}	—	September 23, 2008	Kitt Peak	Spacewatch	·	970 m	MPC · JPL
829332	2006 JY_{84}	—	May 6, 2006	Mount Lemmon	Mount Lemmon Survey	·	1.3 km	MPC · JPL
829333	2006 JQ_{86}	—	April 1, 2010	WISE	WISE	·	1.7 km	MPC · JPL
829334	2006 JX_{89}	—	May 7, 2006	Mount Lemmon	Mount Lemmon Survey	·	1.9 km	MPC · JPL
829335	2006 KT_{7}	—	May 19, 2006	Mount Lemmon	Mount Lemmon Survey	·	1.6 km	MPC · JPL
829336	2006 KT_{8}	—	April 25, 2006	Mount Lemmon	Mount Lemmon Survey	·	2.1 km	MPC · JPL
829337	2006 KR_{10}	—	May 19, 2006	Mount Lemmon	Mount Lemmon Survey	·	880 m	MPC · JPL
829338	2006 KJ_{52}	—	May 21, 2006	Kitt Peak	Spacewatch	·	1.4 km	MPC · JPL
829339	2006 KT_{61}	—	May 9, 2006	Mount Lemmon	Mount Lemmon Survey	·	1.5 km	MPC · JPL
829340	2006 KV_{65}	—	May 24, 2006	Kitt Peak	Spacewatch	·	510 m	MPC · JPL
829341	2006 KO_{70}	—	September 18, 2003	Kitt Peak	Spacewatch	·	540 m	MPC · JPL
829342	2006 KA_{77}	—	April 30, 2006	Kitt Peak	Spacewatch	·	630 m	MPC · JPL
829343	2006 KD_{84}	—	May 22, 2006	Kitt Peak	Spacewatch	·	840 m	MPC · JPL
829344	2006 KF_{88}	—	May 24, 2006	Kitt Peak	Spacewatch	·	1.2 km	MPC · JPL
829345	2006 KO_{97}	—	May 1, 2006	Kitt Peak	Spacewatch	·	1.7 km	MPC · JPL
829346	2006 KE_{99}	—	May 26, 2006	Kitt Peak	Spacewatch	·	1.2 km	MPC · JPL
829347	2006 KJ_{120}	—	May 31, 2006	Kitt Peak	Spacewatch	·	600 m	MPC · JPL
829348	2006 KQ_{125}	—	May 25, 2006	Mauna Kea	P. A. Wiegert	·	980 m	MPC · JPL
829349	2006 KY_{134}	—	May 25, 2006	Mauna Kea	P. A. Wiegert	·	1.6 km	MPC · JPL
829350	2006 KQ_{135}	—	May 25, 2006	Mauna Kea	P. A. Wiegert	KOR	1.3 km	MPC · JPL
829351	2006 KU_{135}	—	May 25, 2006	Mauna Kea	P. A. Wiegert	KOR	1.1 km	MPC · JPL
829352	2006 KX_{136}	—	May 23, 2006	Mount Lemmon	Mount Lemmon Survey	·	800 m	MPC · JPL
829353	2006 KD_{146}	—	May 23, 2006	Mount Lemmon	Mount Lemmon Survey	·	1.6 km	MPC · JPL
829354	2006 KQ_{147}	—	December 31, 2015	Kitt Peak	Spacewatch	·	2.2 km	MPC · JPL
829355	2006 KZ_{147}	—	August 20, 2014	Haleakala	Pan-STARRS 1	·	930 m	MPC · JPL
829356	2006 KF_{151}	—	November 28, 2013	Mount Lemmon	Mount Lemmon Survey	·	680 m	MPC · JPL
829357	2006 KK_{151}	—	April 10, 2016	Haleakala	Pan-STARRS 1	·	2.6 km	MPC · JPL
829358	2006 KL_{151}	—	October 2, 2013	Haleakala	Pan-STARRS 1	·	420 m	MPC · JPL
829359	2006 KR_{152}	—	February 20, 2010	WISE	WISE	·	2.4 km	MPC · JPL
829360	2006 KH_{154}	—	February 17, 2010	Kitt Peak	Spacewatch	·	1.2 km	MPC · JPL
829361	2006 KY_{154}	—	November 12, 2012	Mount Lemmon	Mount Lemmon Survey	MRX	700 m	MPC · JPL
829362	2006 KT_{156}	—	September 21, 2008	Kitt Peak	Spacewatch	·	2.1 km	MPC · JPL
829363	2006 KE_{157}	—	May 25, 2006	Kitt Peak	Spacewatch	·	1.1 km	MPC · JPL
829364	2006 MT_{11}	—	June 18, 2006	Kitt Peak	Spacewatch	MAR	780 m	MPC · JPL
829365	2006 OJ_{1}	—	July 18, 2006	Lulin	LUSS	·	1.6 km	MPC · JPL
829366	2006 OC_{23}	—	July 21, 2006	Mount Lemmon	Mount Lemmon Survey	·	590 m	MPC · JPL
829367	2006 OD_{23}	—	July 21, 2006	Mount Lemmon	Mount Lemmon Survey	·	2.7 km	MPC · JPL
829368	2006 OP_{23}	—	July 19, 2006	Mauna Kea	P. A. Wiegert, D. Subasinghe	·	1.1 km	MPC · JPL
829369	2006 OV_{26}	—	July 19, 2006	Mauna Kea	P. A. Wiegert, D. Subasinghe	·	2.0 km	MPC · JPL
829370	2006 OM_{37}	—	July 19, 2006	Mauna Kea	P. A. Wiegert, D. Subasinghe	L4	5.8 km	MPC · JPL
829371	2006 OW_{38}	—	October 20, 2016	Mount Lemmon	Mount Lemmon Survey	·	2.0 km	MPC · JPL
829372	2006 OC_{39}	—	July 21, 2006	Mount Lemmon	Mount Lemmon Survey	·	1.4 km	MPC · JPL
829373	2006 OB_{40}	—	December 8, 2015	Mount Lemmon	Mount Lemmon Survey	·	1.1 km	MPC · JPL
829374	2006 OH_{40}	—	July 21, 2006	Mount Lemmon	Mount Lemmon Survey	·	2.8 km	MPC · JPL
829375	2006 PJ_{29}	—	June 3, 2006	Mount Lemmon	Mount Lemmon Survey	·	750 m	MPC · JPL
829376	2006 PB_{43}	—	July 21, 2002	Palomar	NEAT	·	850 m	MPC · JPL
829377	2006 PK_{44}	—	March 23, 2010	WISE	WISE	·	1.7 km	MPC · JPL
829378	2006 QF_{8}	—	February 14, 2005	Kitt Peak	Spacewatch	·	850 m	MPC · JPL
829379	2006 QE_{26}	—	August 19, 2006	Kitt Peak	Spacewatch	·	930 m	MPC · JPL
829380	2006 QK_{63}	—	August 24, 2006	Palomar	NEAT	H	370 m	MPC · JPL
829381	2006 QA_{65}	—	August 19, 2006	Kitt Peak	Spacewatch	·	1.1 km	MPC · JPL
829382	2006 QP_{66}	—	August 21, 2006	Socorro	LINEAR	·	1.3 km	MPC · JPL
829383	2006 QC_{84}	—	August 27, 2006	Kitt Peak	Spacewatch	·	2.4 km	MPC · JPL
829384	2006 QF_{84}	—	August 27, 2006	Kitt Peak	Spacewatch	·	3.6 km	MPC · JPL
829385	2006 QC_{87}	—	August 19, 2006	Kitt Peak	Spacewatch	·	2.2 km	MPC · JPL
829386	2006 QS_{89}	—	August 29, 2006	Socorro	LINEAR	AMO	210 m	MPC · JPL
829387	2006 QR_{90}	—	August 25, 2006	Mauna Kea	D. D. Balam	·	1.3 km	MPC · JPL
829388	2006 QC_{98}	—	August 22, 2006	Palomar	NEAT	·	620 m	MPC · JPL
829389	2006 QH_{99}	—	August 28, 2006	Catalina	CSS	H	710 m	MPC · JPL
829390	2006 QH_{102}	—	August 19, 2006	Kitt Peak	Spacewatch	·	1.2 km	MPC · JPL
829391	2006 QV_{102}	—	August 19, 2006	Kitt Peak	Spacewatch	·	1.3 km	MPC · JPL
829392	2006 QO_{115}	—	August 29, 2006	Catalina	CSS	·	1.1 km	MPC · JPL
829393	2006 QB_{121}	—	August 29, 2006	Catalina	CSS	·	1.0 km	MPC · JPL
829394	2006 QK_{163}	—	August 21, 2006	Kitt Peak	Spacewatch	·	1.3 km	MPC · JPL
829395	2006 QV_{176}	—	August 18, 2006	Kitt Peak	Spacewatch	·	830 m	MPC · JPL
829396	2006 QE_{178}	—	August 27, 2006	Kitt Peak	Spacewatch	·	3.0 km	MPC · JPL
829397	2006 QJ_{192}	—	September 17, 2013	Mount Lemmon	Mount Lemmon Survey	·	490 m	MPC · JPL
829398	2006 QS_{197}	—	August 29, 2006	Kitt Peak	Spacewatch	·	940 m	MPC · JPL
829399	2006 QN_{199}	—	August 29, 2006	Kitt Peak	Spacewatch	·	650 m	MPC · JPL
829400	2006 QO_{199}	—	August 29, 2006	Kitt Peak	Spacewatch	·	1.1 km	MPC · JPL

== 829401–829500 ==
back to top

Designation			Discovery			Properties		Ref
Permanent	Provisional	Named after	Date	Site	Discoverer(s)	Category	Diam.	Ref
829401	2006 QZ_{199}	—	July 26, 2017	Haleakala	Pan-STARRS 1	·	1.0 km	MPC · JPL
829402	2006 QP_{200}	—	January 13, 2015	Haleakala	Pan-STARRS 1	·	3.0 km	MPC · JPL
829403	2006 QG_{201}	—	August 19, 2006	Kitt Peak	Spacewatch	·	1.4 km	MPC · JPL
829404	2006 QF_{202}	—	August 29, 2006	Kitt Peak	Spacewatch	·	2.1 km	MPC · JPL
829405	2006 QS_{204}	—	August 19, 2006	Kitt Peak	Spacewatch	·	1.9 km	MPC · JPL
829406	2006 QO_{206}	—	August 29, 2006	Kitt Peak	Spacewatch	·	1.3 km	MPC · JPL
829407	2006 QD_{208}	—	August 27, 2006	Kitt Peak	Spacewatch	KOR	990 m	MPC · JPL
829408	2006 QP_{209}	—	August 28, 2006	Kitt Peak	Spacewatch	·	520 m	MPC · JPL
829409	2006 RF_{1}	—	September 4, 2006	Marly	P. Kocher	·	2.4 km	MPC · JPL
829410	2006 RE_{30}	—	September 15, 2006	Kitt Peak	Spacewatch	KON	1.9 km	MPC · JPL
829411	2006 RE_{51}	—	September 14, 2006	Kitt Peak	Spacewatch	·	640 m	MPC · JPL
829412	2006 RU_{63}	—	September 14, 2006	Catalina	CSS	·	590 m	MPC · JPL
829413	2006 RP_{64}	—	August 17, 2006	Palomar	NEAT	·	670 m	MPC · JPL
829414	2006 RZ_{64}	—	September 14, 2006	Kitt Peak	Spacewatch	·	1.4 km	MPC · JPL
829415	2006 RP_{70}	—	September 15, 2006	Kitt Peak	Spacewatch	·	2.0 km	MPC · JPL
829416	2006 RA_{101}	—	September 14, 2006	Palomar	NEAT	·	680 m	MPC · JPL
829417	2006 RY_{101}	—	August 30, 2006	Anderson Mesa	LONEOS	·	500 m	MPC · JPL
829418	2006 RG_{105}	—	September 14, 2006	Mauna Kea	Masiero, J., R. Jedicke	·	730 m	MPC · JPL
829419	2006 RE_{106}	—	September 14, 2006	Mauna Kea	Masiero, J., R. Jedicke	·	1.4 km	MPC · JPL
829420	2006 RP_{107}	—	September 14, 2006	Mauna Kea	Masiero, J., R. Jedicke	·	970 m	MPC · JPL
829421	2006 RF_{108}	—	September 14, 2006	Mauna Kea	Masiero, J., R. Jedicke	(18466)	1.7 km	MPC · JPL
829422	2006 RN_{120}	—	September 14, 2006	Kitt Peak	Spacewatch	·	510 m	MPC · JPL
829423	2006 RK_{123}	—	September 14, 2006	Palomar	NEAT	·	1.2 km	MPC · JPL
829424	2006 RG_{125}	—	September 15, 2006	Kitt Peak	Spacewatch	NYS	580 m	MPC · JPL
829425	2006 RW_{125}	—	September 14, 2006	Kitt Peak	Spacewatch	·	1.3 km	MPC · JPL
829426	2006 SD	—	September 16, 2006	Catalina	CSS	THB	2.8 km	MPC · JPL
829427	2006 SK_{2}	—	September 16, 2006	Catalina	CSS	·	1.6 km	MPC · JPL
829428	2006 SS_{2}	—	September 16, 2006	Catalina	CSS	·	1.0 km	MPC · JPL
829429	2006 SZ_{6}	—	September 17, 2006	Catalina	CSS	MAR	690 m	MPC · JPL
829430	2006 SO_{15}	—	September 17, 2006	Catalina	CSS	(5)	1.1 km	MPC · JPL
829431	2006 SM_{29}	—	September 17, 2006	Kitt Peak	Spacewatch	·	1.2 km	MPC · JPL
829432	2006 SG_{32}	—	September 17, 2006	Kitt Peak	Spacewatch	·	1.2 km	MPC · JPL
829433	2006 SN_{33}	—	September 7, 2002	Socorro	LINEAR	·	980 m	MPC · JPL
829434	2006 SE_{34}	—	September 17, 2006	Catalina	CSS	·	1.8 km	MPC · JPL
829435	2006 SF_{42}	—	September 18, 2006	Kitt Peak	Spacewatch	NYS	850 m	MPC · JPL
829436	2006 ST_{57}	—	September 16, 2006	Kitt Peak	Spacewatch	·	1.4 km	MPC · JPL
829437	2006 SZ_{65}	—	August 29, 2006	Kitt Peak	Spacewatch	·	630 m	MPC · JPL
829438	2006 SN_{81}	—	September 18, 2006	Kitt Peak	Spacewatch	·	1.0 km	MPC · JPL
829439	2006 SM_{82}	—	September 14, 2006	Kitt Peak	Spacewatch	·	1.8 km	MPC · JPL
829440	2006 SS_{101}	—	August 27, 2006	Kitt Peak	Spacewatch	·	2.4 km	MPC · JPL
829441	2006 SU_{106}	—	September 19, 2006	Kitt Peak	Spacewatch	EOS	1.2 km	MPC · JPL
829442	2006 SO_{113}	—	September 23, 2006	Kitt Peak	Spacewatch	·	1.4 km	MPC · JPL
829443	2006 SK_{114}	—	September 23, 2006	Kitt Peak	Spacewatch	·	1.4 km	MPC · JPL
829444	2006 SU_{116}	—	September 24, 2006	Kitt Peak	Spacewatch	·	880 m	MPC · JPL
829445	2006 SA_{124}	—	September 19, 2006	Catalina	CSS	·	540 m	MPC · JPL
829446	2006 SM_{140}	—	September 22, 2006	Catalina	CSS	·	1.3 km	MPC · JPL
829447	2006 SW_{157}	—	September 23, 2006	Kitt Peak	Spacewatch	·	1.4 km	MPC · JPL
829448	2006 SC_{159}	—	September 23, 2006	Kitt Peak	Spacewatch	ELF	2.4 km	MPC · JPL
829449	2006 SV_{162}	—	September 24, 2006	Kitt Peak	Spacewatch	·	370 m	MPC · JPL
829450	2006 SQ_{168}	—	September 25, 2006	Kitt Peak	Spacewatch	·	1.1 km	MPC · JPL
829451	2006 SW_{170}	—	September 17, 2006	Kitt Peak	Spacewatch	·	510 m	MPC · JPL
829452	2006 SR_{176}	—	September 25, 2006	Mount Lemmon	Mount Lemmon Survey	KOR	830 m	MPC · JPL
829453	2006 SU_{178}	—	January 22, 2004	Mauna Kea	Allen, R. L.	KOR	1.1 km	MPC · JPL
829454	2006 SB_{179}	—	September 25, 2006	Kitt Peak	Spacewatch	·	1.3 km	MPC · JPL
829455	2006 SF_{180}	—	September 25, 2006	Mount Lemmon	Mount Lemmon Survey	·	2.0 km	MPC · JPL
829456	2006 SD_{181}	—	September 25, 2006	Mount Lemmon	Mount Lemmon Survey	·	410 m	MPC · JPL
829457	2006 ST_{182}	—	September 25, 2006	Kitt Peak	Spacewatch	·	660 m	MPC · JPL
829458	2006 SN_{184}	—	September 25, 2006	Kitt Peak	Spacewatch	MAS	420 m	MPC · JPL
829459	2006 SU_{196}	—	September 26, 2006	Kitt Peak	Spacewatch	·	460 m	MPC · JPL
829460	2006 SN_{201}	—	September 24, 2006	Kitt Peak	Spacewatch	H	310 m	MPC · JPL
829461	2006 SD_{205}	—	September 15, 2006	Kitt Peak	Spacewatch	·	1.5 km	MPC · JPL
829462	2006 SS_{214}	—	September 27, 2006	Mount Lemmon	Mount Lemmon Survey	·	1.8 km	MPC · JPL
829463	2006 SG_{227}	—	September 26, 2006	Kitt Peak	Spacewatch	·	2.0 km	MPC · JPL
829464	2006 SF_{228}	—	September 26, 2006	Kitt Peak	Spacewatch	·	1.3 km	MPC · JPL
829465	2006 SE_{231}	—	September 18, 2006	Kitt Peak	Spacewatch	·	900 m	MPC · JPL
829466	2006 SB_{237}	—	September 26, 2006	Mount Lemmon	Mount Lemmon Survey	·	810 m	MPC · JPL
829467	2006 SA_{252}	—	September 19, 2006	Kitt Peak	Spacewatch	·	610 m	MPC · JPL
829468	2006 SA_{255}	—	September 26, 2006	Mount Lemmon	Mount Lemmon Survey	·	1.7 km	MPC · JPL
829469	2006 SJ_{259}	—	September 15, 2006	Kitt Peak	Spacewatch	·	1.2 km	MPC · JPL
829470	2006 SR_{259}	—	September 26, 2006	Kitt Peak	Spacewatch	·	1.6 km	MPC · JPL
829471	2006 SF_{265}	—	September 26, 2006	Kitt Peak	Spacewatch	SYL	3.3 km	MPC · JPL
829472	2006 SY_{280}	—	September 18, 2006	Catalina	CSS	·	1.1 km	MPC · JPL
829473	2006 ST_{281}	—	August 27, 2006	Lulin	LUSS	·	1.5 km	MPC · JPL
829474	2006 SX_{281}	—	September 22, 2006	Catalina	CSS	·	1.4 km	MPC · JPL
829475	2006 SM_{295}	—	September 17, 2006	Kitt Peak	Spacewatch	·	1.3 km	MPC · JPL
829476	2006 SJ_{296}	—	September 17, 2006	Kitt Peak	Spacewatch	·	1.8 km	MPC · JPL
829477	2006 SD_{302}	—	September 27, 2006	Kitt Peak	Spacewatch	H	390 m	MPC · JPL
829478	2006 SK_{308}	—	September 27, 2006	Kitt Peak	Spacewatch	AGN	810 m	MPC · JPL
829479	2006 SF_{320}	—	September 17, 2006	Kitt Peak	Spacewatch	·	560 m	MPC · JPL
829480	2006 SJ_{324}	—	September 27, 2006	Kitt Peak	Spacewatch	·	900 m	MPC · JPL
829481	2006 SB_{331}	—	September 12, 2001	Kitt Peak	Spacewatch	KOR	960 m	MPC · JPL
829482	2006 SC_{332}	—	September 28, 2006	Mount Lemmon	Mount Lemmon Survey	(5)	1.2 km	MPC · JPL
829483	2006 SR_{332}	—	September 14, 2006	Kitt Peak	Spacewatch	·	1.1 km	MPC · JPL
829484	2006 SH_{371}	—	September 27, 2006	Sacramento Peak	SDSS Collaboration	L4	8.5 km	MPC · JPL
829485	2006 SO_{378}	—	November 11, 2001	Sacramento Peak	SDSS	·	1.5 km	MPC · JPL
829486	2006 SC_{381}	—	September 27, 2006	Apache Point	SDSS Collaboration	·	780 m	MPC · JPL
829487	2006 SJ_{395}	—	September 26, 2006	Kitt Peak	Spacewatch	MAS	460 m	MPC · JPL
829488	2006 SX_{405}	—	September 17, 2006	Kitt Peak	Spacewatch	MAS	520 m	MPC · JPL
829489	2006 SO_{410}	—	September 17, 2006	Kitt Peak	Spacewatch	·	1.3 km	MPC · JPL
829490	2006 SY_{416}	—	October 25, 2011	Haleakala	Pan-STARRS 1	·	860 m	MPC · JPL
829491	2006 SQ_{422}	—	September 19, 2006	Catalina	CSS	·	910 m	MPC · JPL
829492	2006 SK_{427}	—	September 28, 2006	Mount Lemmon	Mount Lemmon Survey	·	950 m	MPC · JPL
829493	2006 SR_{428}	—	October 7, 2002	Palomar	NEAT	(5)	880 m	MPC · JPL
829494	2006 SS_{434}	—	September 17, 2006	Kitt Peak	Spacewatch	·	1.2 km	MPC · JPL
829495	2006 SL_{436}	—	September 27, 2006	Catalina	CSS	·	940 m	MPC · JPL
829496	2006 SK_{438}	—	September 14, 2006	Kitt Peak	Spacewatch	·	410 m	MPC · JPL
829497	2006 SB_{443}	—	September 4, 2011	Haleakala	Pan-STARRS 1	KOR	1.1 km	MPC · JPL
829498	2006 SH_{446}	—	September 17, 2006	Kitt Peak	Spacewatch	·	1.3 km	MPC · JPL
829499	2006 SV_{449}	—	September 19, 2006	Kitt Peak	Spacewatch	·	500 m	MPC · JPL
829500	2006 SV_{450}	—	September 28, 2006	Kitt Peak	Spacewatch	·	720 m	MPC · JPL

== 829501–829600 ==
back to top

Designation			Discovery			Properties		Ref
Permanent	Provisional	Named after	Date	Site	Discoverer(s)	Category	Diam.	Ref
829501	2006 SK_{452}	—	August 29, 2006	Catalina	CSS	·	580 m	MPC · JPL
829502	2006 SV_{455}	—	September 28, 2006	Mount Lemmon	Mount Lemmon Survey	·	870 m	MPC · JPL
829503	2006 SA_{459}	—	September 28, 2006	Catalina	CSS	·	530 m	MPC · JPL
829504	2006 SL_{460}	—	September 18, 2006	Anderson Mesa	LONEOS	·	740 m	MPC · JPL
829505	2006 SD_{461}	—	September 26, 2006	Mount Lemmon	Mount Lemmon Survey	·	680 m	MPC · JPL
829506	2006 SW_{461}	—	September 17, 2006	Kitt Peak	Spacewatch	·	400 m	MPC · JPL
829507	2006 TC_{27}	—	September 26, 2006	Mount Lemmon	Mount Lemmon Survey	·	730 m	MPC · JPL
829508	2006 TU_{54}	—	October 12, 2006	Palomar	NEAT	·	1.2 km	MPC · JPL
829509	2006 TR_{58}	—	October 13, 2006	Kitt Peak	Spacewatch	·	420 m	MPC · JPL
829510	2006 TF_{74}	—	July 21, 2006	Mount Lemmon	Mount Lemmon Survey	·	1.8 km	MPC · JPL
829511	2006 TM_{84}	—	September 28, 2006	Catalina	CSS	·	1.7 km	MPC · JPL
829512	2006 TZ_{89}	—	July 21, 2006	Mount Lemmon	Mount Lemmon Survey	·	1.2 km	MPC · JPL
829513	2006 TX_{107}	—	October 11, 2006	Sacramento Peak	SDSS Collaboration	EOS	1.5 km	MPC · JPL
829514	2006 TZ_{107}	—	September 27, 2006	Mount Lemmon	Mount Lemmon Survey	EUN	860 m	MPC · JPL
829515	2006 TP_{108}	—	October 2, 2006	Mount Lemmon	Mount Lemmon Survey	·	420 m	MPC · JPL
829516	2006 TZ_{111}	—	October 1, 2006	Apache Point	SDSS Collaboration	BRA	850 m	MPC · JPL
829517	2006 TL_{113}	—	October 1, 2006	Apache Point	SDSS Collaboration	·	780 m	MPC · JPL
829518	2006 TY_{115}	—	September 30, 2006	Mount Lemmon	Mount Lemmon Survey	·	500 m	MPC · JPL
829519	2006 TA_{120}	—	September 26, 2006	Kitt Peak	Spacewatch	·	1.3 km	MPC · JPL
829520	2006 TJ_{120}	—	October 12, 2006	Apache Point	SDSS Collaboration	EOS	1.2 km	MPC · JPL
829521	2006 TS_{125}	—	October 13, 2006	Kitt Peak	Spacewatch	·	2.0 km	MPC · JPL
829522	2006 TB_{127}	—	October 3, 2006	Mount Lemmon	Mount Lemmon Survey	·	1.0 km	MPC · JPL
829523	2006 TO_{130}	—	October 13, 2006	Mauna Kea	P. A. Wiegert, A. M. Gilbert	res · 3:4	111 km	MPC · JPL
829524	2006 TE_{136}	—	October 2, 2006	Mount Lemmon	Mount Lemmon Survey	·	960 m	MPC · JPL
829525	2006 TK_{140}	—	October 2, 2006	Mount Lemmon	Mount Lemmon Survey	·	500 m	MPC · JPL
829526	2006 TB_{145}	—	October 2, 2006	Mount Lemmon	Mount Lemmon Survey	·	1.3 km	MPC · JPL
829527	2006 UV_{4}	—	September 18, 2006	Kitt Peak	Spacewatch	·	1.2 km	MPC · JPL
829528	2006 UX_{18}	—	September 25, 2006	Kitt Peak	Spacewatch	·	1.5 km	MPC · JPL
829529	2006 UC_{20}	—	September 26, 2006	Kitt Peak	Spacewatch	·	2.1 km	MPC · JPL
829530	2006 UZ_{21}	—	September 26, 2006	Kitt Peak	Spacewatch	·	900 m	MPC · JPL
829531	2006 UX_{39}	—	October 16, 2006	Kitt Peak	Spacewatch	·	1.0 km	MPC · JPL
829532	2006 UT_{49}	—	October 17, 2006	Kitt Peak	Spacewatch	·	500 m	MPC · JPL
829533	2006 UC_{81}	—	October 4, 2006	Mount Lemmon	Mount Lemmon Survey	·	1.2 km	MPC · JPL
829534	2006 UN_{82}	—	October 2, 2006	Mount Lemmon	Mount Lemmon Survey	·	910 m	MPC · JPL
829535	2006 UN_{98}	—	October 2, 2006	Mount Lemmon	Mount Lemmon Survey	·	520 m	MPC · JPL
829536	2006 UM_{112}	—	August 25, 2006	Lulin	LUSS	·	1.2 km	MPC · JPL
829537	2006 UU_{116}	—	October 19, 2006	Kitt Peak	Spacewatch	·	1.3 km	MPC · JPL
829538	2006 UK_{117}	—	October 19, 2006	Kitt Peak	Spacewatch	·	480 m	MPC · JPL
829539	2006 UG_{136}	—	October 4, 2006	Mount Lemmon	Mount Lemmon Survey	KON	1.5 km	MPC · JPL
829540	2006 UO_{142}	—	October 19, 2006	Kitt Peak	Spacewatch	·	740 m	MPC · JPL
829541	2006 UO_{148}	—	October 20, 2006	Mount Lemmon	Mount Lemmon Survey	·	1.3 km	MPC · JPL
829542	2006 UK_{152}	—	October 21, 2006	Kitt Peak	Spacewatch	T_{j} (2.97) · 3:2	4.1 km	MPC · JPL
829543	2006 UJ_{153}	—	October 21, 2006	Kitt Peak	Spacewatch	·	490 m	MPC · JPL
829544	2006 US_{157}	—	September 19, 2006	Kitt Peak	Spacewatch	·	1.1 km	MPC · JPL
829545	2006 UD_{161}	—	October 21, 2006	Mount Lemmon	Mount Lemmon Survey	·	930 m	MPC · JPL
829546	2006 UO_{196}	—	September 26, 2006	Mount Lemmon	Mount Lemmon Survey	·	2.0 km	MPC · JPL
829547	2006 UP_{196}	—	September 26, 2006	Mount Lemmon	Mount Lemmon Survey	·	610 m	MPC · JPL
829548	2006 UV_{207}	—	September 30, 2006	Mount Lemmon	Mount Lemmon Survey	·	1.5 km	MPC · JPL
829549	2006 UW_{239}	—	October 23, 2006	Kitt Peak	Spacewatch	MAS	510 m	MPC · JPL
829550	2006 UR_{240}	—	October 23, 2006	Kitt Peak	Spacewatch	·	1 km	MPC · JPL
829551	2006 UT_{242}	—	October 1, 2006	Kitt Peak	Spacewatch	·	930 m	MPC · JPL
829552	2006 UY_{269}	—	September 30, 2006	Mount Lemmon	Mount Lemmon Survey	(2076)	600 m	MPC · JPL
829553	2006 UE_{277}	—	October 2, 2006	Mount Lemmon	Mount Lemmon Survey	(5)	840 m	MPC · JPL
829554	2006 UM_{291}	—	October 17, 2006	Sacramento Peak	SDSS Collaboration	L4	7.7 km	MPC · JPL
829555	2006 UF_{296}	—	April 12, 2005	Kitt Peak	Spacewatch	·	750 m	MPC · JPL
829556	2006 UR_{298}	—	October 19, 2006	Kitt Peak	Deep Ecliptic Survey	·	430 m	MPC · JPL
829557	2006 UN_{304}	—	October 19, 2006	Kitt Peak	Deep Ecliptic Survey	·	1.8 km	MPC · JPL
829558	2006 US_{316}	—	November 23, 2006	Kitt Peak	Spacewatch	·	770 m	MPC · JPL
829559	2006 UQ_{317}	—	October 19, 2006	Kitt Peak	Deep Ecliptic Survey	·	1.7 km	MPC · JPL
829560	2006 UQ_{322}	—	October 16, 2006	Mount Lemmon	Mount Lemmon Survey	NYS	670 m	MPC · JPL
829561	2006 US_{333}	—	October 11, 2006	Apache Point	SDSS Collaboration	·	980 m	MPC · JPL
829562	2006 UV_{338}	—	October 20, 2006	Kitt Peak	Spacewatch	·	1.7 km	MPC · JPL
829563	2006 UU_{345}	—	October 16, 2006	Kitt Peak	Spacewatch	·	640 m	MPC · JPL
829564	2006 UY_{366}	—	October 20, 2006	Kitt Peak	Spacewatch	·	870 m	MPC · JPL
829565	2006 UO_{373}	—	November 7, 2015	Mount Lemmon	Mount Lemmon Survey	JUN	910 m	MPC · JPL
829566	2006 UA_{375}	—	October 17, 2006	Mount Lemmon	Mount Lemmon Survey	NYS	870 m	MPC · JPL
829567	2006 UW_{379}	—	October 21, 2006	Kitt Peak	Spacewatch	·	1.5 km	MPC · JPL
829568	2006 UL_{382}	—	October 20, 2006	Kitt Peak	Spacewatch	EOS	1.2 km	MPC · JPL
829569	2006 UG_{384}	—	October 20, 2006	Kitt Peak	Spacewatch	EOS	1.2 km	MPC · JPL
829570	2006 UT_{384}	—	October 22, 2006	Kitt Peak	Spacewatch	·	670 m	MPC · JPL
829571	2006 UD_{385}	—	October 21, 2006	Mount Lemmon	Mount Lemmon Survey	·	790 m	MPC · JPL
829572	2006 UQ_{385}	—	October 22, 2006	Kitt Peak	Spacewatch	NYS	750 m	MPC · JPL
829573	2006 UV_{388}	—	October 29, 2006	Mount Lemmon	Mount Lemmon Survey	·	410 m	MPC · JPL
829574	2006 UG_{389}	—	October 20, 2006	Kitt Peak	Spacewatch	·	1.4 km	MPC · JPL
829575	2006 UZ_{390}	—	October 19, 2006	Kitt Peak	Spacewatch	·	910 m	MPC · JPL
829576	2006 UY_{392}	—	December 14, 2018	Haleakala	Pan-STARRS 1	·	1.7 km	MPC · JPL
829577	2006 UY_{393}	—	October 17, 2006	Kitt Peak	Spacewatch	·	460 m	MPC · JPL
829578	2006 VV_{10}	—	October 21, 2006	Kitt Peak	Spacewatch	EUN	980 m	MPC · JPL
829579	2006 VM_{18}	—	September 26, 2006	Mount Lemmon	Mount Lemmon Survey	·	450 m	MPC · JPL
829580	2006 VM_{35}	—	September 28, 2006	Mount Lemmon	Mount Lemmon Survey	NYS	570 m	MPC · JPL
829581	2006 VF_{37}	—	October 19, 2006	Catalina	CSS	·	2.0 km	MPC · JPL
829582	2006 VP_{54}	—	October 19, 2006	Mount Lemmon	Mount Lemmon Survey	MAS	570 m	MPC · JPL
829583	2006 VK_{72}	—	October 23, 2006	Mount Lemmon	Mount Lemmon Survey	·	850 m	MPC · JPL
829584	2006 VX_{81}	—	October 21, 2006	Kitt Peak	Spacewatch	·	1.0 km	MPC · JPL
829585	2006 VF_{91}	—	November 14, 2006	Mount Lemmon	Mount Lemmon Survey	·	1.1 km	MPC · JPL
829586	2006 VD_{102}	—	October 12, 2006	Kitt Peak	Spacewatch	·	640 m	MPC · JPL
829587	2006 VM_{102}	—	November 12, 2006	Mount Lemmon	Mount Lemmon Survey	·	700 m	MPC · JPL
829588	2006 VZ_{126}	—	October 31, 2006	Kitt Peak	Spacewatch	·	810 m	MPC · JPL
829589	2006 VT_{132}	—	November 15, 2006	Kitt Peak	Spacewatch	·	1.7 km	MPC · JPL
829590	2006 VB_{136}	—	October 20, 2006	Mount Lemmon	Mount Lemmon Survey	·	890 m	MPC · JPL
829591	2006 VL_{137}	—	November 1, 2006	Mount Lemmon	Mount Lemmon Survey	·	1.6 km	MPC · JPL
829592	2006 VD_{142}	—	November 14, 2006	Kitt Peak	Spacewatch	·	550 m	MPC · JPL
829593	2006 VN_{145}	—	November 15, 2006	Catalina	CSS	BRG	1.2 km	MPC · JPL
829594	2006 VJ_{147}	—	November 15, 2006	Mount Lemmon	Mount Lemmon Survey	·	1.8 km	MPC · JPL
829595	2006 VK_{148}	—	November 15, 2006	Mount Lemmon	Mount Lemmon Survey	·	910 m	MPC · JPL
829596	2006 VY_{171}	—	October 21, 2006	Kitt Peak	Spacewatch	·	1.1 km	MPC · JPL
829597	2006 VD_{179}	—	November 1, 2006	Mount Lemmon	Mount Lemmon Survey	·	1.6 km	MPC · JPL
829598	2006 VR_{186}	—	November 2, 2006	Mount Lemmon	Mount Lemmon Survey	·	1.3 km	MPC · JPL
829599	2006 WQ_{3}	—	November 21, 2006	Catalina	CSS	·	430 m	MPC · JPL
829600	2006 WB_{13}	—	November 16, 2006	Mount Lemmon	Mount Lemmon Survey	·	1.4 km	MPC · JPL

== 829601–829700 ==
back to top

Designation			Discovery			Properties		Ref
Permanent	Provisional	Named after	Date	Site	Discoverer(s)	Category	Diam.	Ref
829601	2006 WD_{13}	—	November 16, 2006	Mount Lemmon	Mount Lemmon Survey	·	960 m	MPC · JPL
829602	2006 WB_{36}	—	November 16, 2006	Kitt Peak	Spacewatch	·	790 m	MPC · JPL
829603	2006 WX_{36}	—	October 3, 2006	Mount Lemmon	Mount Lemmon Survey	·	840 m	MPC · JPL
829604	2006 WU_{37}	—	October 23, 2006	Mount Lemmon	Mount Lemmon Survey	AGN	860 m	MPC · JPL
829605	2006 WZ_{40}	—	November 16, 2006	Kitt Peak	Spacewatch	·	480 m	MPC · JPL
829606	2006 WO_{55}	—	November 16, 2006	Kitt Peak	Spacewatch	·	3.4 km	MPC · JPL
829607	2006 WR_{64}	—	November 17, 2006	Mount Lemmon	Mount Lemmon Survey	·	1.6 km	MPC · JPL
829608	2006 WO_{66}	—	November 17, 2006	Mount Lemmon	Mount Lemmon Survey	·	1.6 km	MPC · JPL
829609	2006 WT_{71}	—	October 27, 2006	Kitt Peak	Spacewatch	·	1.1 km	MPC · JPL
829610	2006 WJ_{84}	—	October 3, 2006	Mount Lemmon	Mount Lemmon Survey	·	1.8 km	MPC · JPL
829611	2006 WT_{97}	—	November 19, 2006	Kitt Peak	Spacewatch	KOR	1.3 km	MPC · JPL
829612	2006 WH_{116}	—	November 15, 2006	Kitt Peak	Spacewatch	·	1.3 km	MPC · JPL
829613	2006 WZ_{131}	—	November 18, 2006	Kitt Peak	Spacewatch	·	1.9 km	MPC · JPL
829614	2006 WG_{136}	—	November 11, 2006	Kitt Peak	Spacewatch	·	680 m	MPC · JPL
829615	2006 WD_{145}	—	November 20, 2006	Kitt Peak	Spacewatch	·	1.9 km	MPC · JPL
829616	2006 WF_{145}	—	November 20, 2006	Kitt Peak	Spacewatch	·	420 m	MPC · JPL
829617	2006 WH_{147}	—	November 20, 2006	Kitt Peak	Spacewatch	·	910 m	MPC · JPL
829618	2006 WO_{152}	—	November 21, 2006	Mount Lemmon	Mount Lemmon Survey	·	1.3 km	MPC · JPL
829619	2006 WT_{158}	—	November 22, 2006	Mount Lemmon	Mount Lemmon Survey	V	470 m	MPC · JPL
829620	2006 WQ_{159}	—	November 22, 2006	Kitt Peak	Spacewatch	·	1.6 km	MPC · JPL
829621	2006 WM_{181}	—	November 24, 2006	Mount Lemmon	Mount Lemmon Survey	·	390 m	MPC · JPL
829622	2006 WQ_{181}	—	November 11, 2006	Kitt Peak	Spacewatch	·	410 m	MPC · JPL
829623	2006 WD_{183}	—	November 24, 2006	Kitt Peak	Spacewatch	·	980 m	MPC · JPL
829624	2006 WQ_{185}	—	October 17, 2006	Catalina	CSS	·	1.4 km	MPC · JPL
829625	2006 WS_{197}	—	October 3, 2006	Mount Lemmon	Mount Lemmon Survey	·	530 m	MPC · JPL
829626	2006 WK_{212}	—	November 18, 2006	Kitt Peak	Spacewatch	·	2.1 km	MPC · JPL
829627	2006 WE_{213}	—	December 4, 2012	Kitt Peak	Spacewatch	·	1.1 km	MPC · JPL
829628	2006 WQ_{214}	—	April 29, 2008	Mount Lemmon	Mount Lemmon Survey	·	950 m	MPC · JPL
829629	2006 WM_{215}	—	November 18, 2006	Kitt Peak	Spacewatch	H	480 m	MPC · JPL
829630	2006 WJ_{218}	—	November 17, 2006	Mount Lemmon	Mount Lemmon Survey	·	1.3 km	MPC · JPL
829631	2006 WP_{219}	—	November 26, 2017	Mount Lemmon	Mount Lemmon Survey	V	460 m	MPC · JPL
829632	2006 WS_{219}	—	March 20, 1999	Sacramento Peak	SDSS	·	1.7 km	MPC · JPL
829633	2006 WG_{222}	—	April 25, 2017	Haleakala	Pan-STARRS 1	·	820 m	MPC · JPL
829634	2006 WZ_{225}	—	June 22, 2009	Mount Lemmon	Mount Lemmon Survey	·	550 m	MPC · JPL
829635	2006 WK_{226}	—	September 23, 2009	Kitt Peak	Spacewatch	·	470 m	MPC · JPL
829636	2006 WY_{226}	—	October 4, 2016	Mount Lemmon	Mount Lemmon Survey	·	470 m	MPC · JPL
829637	2006 WS_{228}	—	November 18, 2006	Kitt Peak	Spacewatch	MIS	1.6 km	MPC · JPL
829638	2006 WH_{230}	—	November 20, 2006	Kitt Peak	Spacewatch	H	400 m	MPC · JPL
829639	2006 WY_{230}	—	November 21, 2006	Mount Lemmon	Mount Lemmon Survey	·	3.2 km	MPC · JPL
829640	2006 WG_{235}	—	November 23, 2006	Kitt Peak	Spacewatch	·	440 m	MPC · JPL
829641	2006 WU_{237}	—	November 18, 2006	Kitt Peak	Spacewatch	·	470 m	MPC · JPL
829642	2006 WZ_{237}	—	November 17, 2006	Catalina	CSS	ADE	1.3 km	MPC · JPL
829643	2006 XV_{14}	—	December 10, 2006	Kitt Peak	Spacewatch	·	490 m	MPC · JPL
829644	2006 XL_{16}	—	November 22, 2006	Mount Lemmon	Mount Lemmon Survey	·	1.2 km	MPC · JPL
829645	2006 XT_{24}	—	August 9, 2001	Palomar	NEAT	·	1.8 km	MPC · JPL
829646	2006 XA_{31}	—	December 12, 2006	Marly	P. Kocher	NYS	710 m	MPC · JPL
829647	2006 XM_{47}	—	November 11, 2006	Kitt Peak	Spacewatch	·	440 m	MPC · JPL
829648	2006 XZ_{77}	—	May 13, 2018	Mount Lemmon	Mount Lemmon Survey	EUN	1.0 km	MPC · JPL
829649	2006 XW_{79}	—	June 6, 2018	Haleakala	Pan-STARRS 1	·	500 m	MPC · JPL
829650	2006 XE_{82}	—	December 13, 2006	Mount Lemmon	Mount Lemmon Survey	TRE	1.5 km	MPC · JPL
829651	2006 YR_{19}	—	December 24, 2006	Bergisch Gladbach	W. Bickel	H	300 m	MPC · JPL
829652	2006 YT_{23}	—	December 21, 2006	Kitt Peak	Spacewatch	MAS	470 m	MPC · JPL
829653	2006 YB_{24}	—	December 13, 2006	Kitt Peak	Spacewatch	·	1.7 km	MPC · JPL
829654	2006 YC_{25}	—	December 21, 2006	Kitt Peak	Spacewatch	·	1.9 km	MPC · JPL
829655	2006 YK_{25}	—	December 14, 2006	Kitt Peak	Spacewatch	·	1.4 km	MPC · JPL
829656	2006 YO_{25}	—	December 21, 2006	Kitt Peak	Spacewatch	·	610 m	MPC · JPL
829657	2006 YV_{28}	—	December 21, 2006	Kitt Peak	Spacewatch	·	830 m	MPC · JPL
829658	2006 YJ_{29}	—	December 21, 2006	Kitt Peak	Spacewatch	NYS	690 m	MPC · JPL
829659	2006 YJ_{31}	—	December 21, 2006	Kitt Peak	Spacewatch	·	1.7 km	MPC · JPL
829660	2006 YC_{57}	—	December 21, 2006	Mount Lemmon	Mount Lemmon Survey	·	1.3 km	MPC · JPL
829661	2006 YN_{59}	—	December 21, 2006	Kitt Peak	Spacewatch	·	920 m	MPC · JPL
829662	2006 YR_{59}	—	October 25, 2011	Haleakala	Pan-STARRS 1	·	1.6 km	MPC · JPL
829663	2006 YT_{63}	—	October 8, 2015	Haleakala	Pan-STARRS 1	AGN	860 m	MPC · JPL
829664	2006 YY_{66}	—	December 23, 2006	Mount Lemmon	Mount Lemmon Survey	·	2.2 km	MPC · JPL
829665	2006 YC_{70}	—	December 21, 2006	Kitt Peak	L. H. Wasserman, M. W. Buie	·	1.3 km	MPC · JPL
829666	2007 AB_{35}	—	January 28, 2017	Haleakala	Pan-STARRS 1	·	580 m	MPC · JPL
829667	2007 AV_{35}	—	January 10, 2007	Mount Lemmon	Mount Lemmon Survey	·	800 m	MPC · JPL
829668	2007 AP_{40}	—	January 10, 2007	Mount Lemmon	Mount Lemmon Survey	·	2.1 km	MPC · JPL
829669	2007 BB_{14}	—	December 15, 2006	Mount Lemmon	Mount Lemmon Survey	·	890 m	MPC · JPL
829670	2007 BJ_{16}	—	January 17, 2007	Kitt Peak	Spacewatch	·	930 m	MPC · JPL
829671	2007 BW_{24}	—	January 17, 2007	Kitt Peak	Spacewatch	NYS	610 m	MPC · JPL
829672	2007 BQ_{33}	—	December 16, 2006	Mount Lemmon	Mount Lemmon Survey	·	2.0 km	MPC · JPL
829673	2007 BH_{34}	—	January 24, 2007	Mount Lemmon	Mount Lemmon Survey	·	490 m	MPC · JPL
829674	2007 BU_{34}	—	January 9, 2007	Mount Lemmon	Mount Lemmon Survey	H	330 m	MPC · JPL
829675	2007 BE_{35}	—	January 24, 2007	Mount Lemmon	Mount Lemmon Survey	·	1.5 km	MPC · JPL
829676	2007 BO_{35}	—	January 24, 2007	Mount Lemmon	Mount Lemmon Survey	·	840 m	MPC · JPL
829677	2007 BH_{40}	—	January 24, 2007	Mount Lemmon	Mount Lemmon Survey	·	470 m	MPC · JPL
829678	2007 BQ_{41}	—	January 24, 2007	Mount Lemmon	Mount Lemmon Survey	·	1.1 km	MPC · JPL
829679	2007 BG_{52}	—	January 24, 2007	Kitt Peak	Spacewatch	PHO	500 m	MPC · JPL
829680	2007 BS_{84}	—	January 19, 2007	Mauna Kea	P. A. Wiegert	LIX	3.0 km	MPC · JPL
829681	2007 BG_{86}	—	November 11, 2001	Sacramento Peak	SDSS	·	970 m	MPC · JPL
829682	2007 BN_{103}	—	January 25, 2007	Kitt Peak	Spacewatch	·	1.1 km	MPC · JPL
829683	2007 BU_{103}	—	January 27, 2007	Mount Lemmon	Mount Lemmon Survey	H	450 m	MPC · JPL
829684	2007 BK_{106}	—	January 28, 2007	Mount Lemmon	Mount Lemmon Survey	·	1.4 km	MPC · JPL
829685	2007 BB_{107}	—	October 23, 2009	Kitt Peak	Spacewatch	·	530 m	MPC · JPL
829686	2007 BC_{107}	—	September 21, 2009	Mount Lemmon	Mount Lemmon Survey	·	460 m	MPC · JPL
829687	2007 BW_{107}	—	May 20, 2015	Haleakala	Pan-STARRS 1	NYS	740 m	MPC · JPL
829688	2007 BY_{107}	—	October 9, 2013	Mount Lemmon	Mount Lemmon Survey	MAS	470 m	MPC · JPL
829689	2007 BN_{108}	—	January 27, 2012	Mount Lemmon	Mount Lemmon Survey	·	1.0 km	MPC · JPL
829690	2007 BS_{110}	—	January 27, 2007	Kitt Peak	Spacewatch	MAS	490 m	MPC · JPL
829691	2007 BX_{110}	—	January 27, 2007	Kitt Peak	Spacewatch	·	530 m	MPC · JPL
829692	2007 BM_{112}	—	June 19, 2010	Mount Lemmon	Mount Lemmon Survey	·	2.5 km	MPC · JPL
829693	2007 BA_{113}	—	August 21, 2015	Haleakala	Pan-STARRS 1	·	1.6 km	MPC · JPL
829694	2007 BD_{113}	—	January 27, 2007	Mount Lemmon	Mount Lemmon Survey	·	570 m	MPC · JPL
829695	2007 BW_{113}	—	November 19, 2009	Kitt Peak	Spacewatch	·	450 m	MPC · JPL
829696	2007 BX_{113}	—	January 27, 2007	Kitt Peak	Spacewatch	·	2.2 km	MPC · JPL
829697	2007 BB_{116}	—	January 27, 2007	Mount Lemmon	Mount Lemmon Survey	·	1.7 km	MPC · JPL
829698	2007 BU_{116}	—	January 28, 2007	Mount Lemmon	Mount Lemmon Survey	·	2.7 km	MPC · JPL
829699	2007 BU_{118}	—	January 25, 2007	Kitt Peak	Spacewatch	·	1.9 km	MPC · JPL
829700	2007 CL_{12}	—	January 26, 2007	Kitt Peak	Spacewatch	H	420 m	MPC · JPL

== 829701–829800 ==
back to top

Designation			Discovery			Properties		Ref
Permanent	Provisional	Named after	Date	Site	Discoverer(s)	Category	Diam.	Ref
829701	2007 CW_{18}	—	August 19, 2001	Cerro Tololo	Deep Ecliptic Survey	NYS	690 m	MPC · JPL
829702	2007 CD_{41}	—	January 27, 2007	Kitt Peak	Spacewatch	·	470 m	MPC · JPL
829703	2007 CO_{42}	—	February 7, 2007	Mount Lemmon	Mount Lemmon Survey	·	810 m	MPC · JPL
829704	2007 CT_{55}	—	January 31, 2003	Kitt Peak	Spacewatch	·	860 m	MPC · JPL
829705	2007 CS_{69}	—	December 25, 2006	Kitt Peak	Spacewatch	·	2.0 km	MPC · JPL
829706	2007 CM_{70}	—	February 16, 2007	Mount Lemmon	Mount Lemmon Survey	·	1.4 km	MPC · JPL
829707	2007 CG_{73}	—	February 14, 2007	Mauna Kea	P. A. Wiegert	EOS	1.2 km	MPC · JPL
829708	2007 CG_{81}	—	January 20, 2015	Mount Lemmon	Mount Lemmon Survey	·	860 m	MPC · JPL
829709	2007 CH_{83}	—	March 10, 2007	Mount Lemmon	Mount Lemmon Survey	·	2.2 km	MPC · JPL
829710	2007 CP_{83}	—	October 21, 2015	Haleakala	Pan-STARRS 1	·	1.5 km	MPC · JPL
829711	2007 CS_{85}	—	February 13, 2007	Mount Lemmon	Mount Lemmon Survey	·	760 m	MPC · JPL
829712	2007 CE_{86}	—	May 8, 2019	Haleakala	Pan-STARRS 1	·	2.0 km	MPC · JPL
829713	2007 CJ_{86}	—	February 9, 2007	Mount Lemmon	Mount Lemmon Survey	HNS	1.0 km	MPC · JPL
829714	2007 CW_{86}	—	February 6, 2007	Mount Lemmon	Mount Lemmon Survey	MAS	540 m	MPC · JPL
829715	2007 CM_{87}	—	February 6, 2007	Kitt Peak	Spacewatch	·	1.4 km	MPC · JPL
829716	2007 DG_{1}	—	February 16, 2007	Bergisch Gladbach	W. Bickel	·	580 m	MPC · JPL
829717	2007 DC_{9}	—	February 17, 2007	Kitt Peak	Spacewatch	MAS	520 m	MPC · JPL
829718	2007 DS_{16}	—	January 27, 2007	Kitt Peak	Spacewatch	·	1.5 km	MPC · JPL
829719	2007 DS_{20}	—	February 17, 2007	Kitt Peak	Spacewatch	BRG	1.0 km	MPC · JPL
829720	2007 DM_{21}	—	February 17, 2007	Kitt Peak	Spacewatch	·	1.5 km	MPC · JPL
829721	2007 DZ_{25}	—	February 17, 2007	Kitt Peak	Spacewatch	·	870 m	MPC · JPL
829722	2007 DT_{40}	—	January 28, 2007	Mount Lemmon	Mount Lemmon Survey	·	3.0 km	MPC · JPL
829723	2007 DL_{45}	—	February 19, 2007	Mount Lemmon	Mount Lemmon Survey	·	660 m	MPC · JPL
829724	2007 DX_{45}	—	February 21, 2007	Bergisch Gladbach	W. Bickel	·	890 m	MPC · JPL
829725	2007 DW_{65}	—	February 21, 2007	Kitt Peak	Spacewatch	SUL	1.4 km	MPC · JPL
829726	2007 DA_{66}	—	February 21, 2007	Kitt Peak	Spacewatch	·	880 m	MPC · JPL
829727	2007 DG_{69}	—	February 21, 2007	Kitt Peak	Spacewatch	·	820 m	MPC · JPL
829728	2007 DV_{72}	—	February 21, 2007	Kitt Peak	Spacewatch	·	810 m	MPC · JPL
829729	2007 DU_{74}	—	February 21, 2007	Kitt Peak	Spacewatch	·	1.3 km	MPC · JPL
829730	2007 DC_{75}	—	February 21, 2007	Mount Lemmon	Mount Lemmon Survey	NYS	750 m	MPC · JPL
829731	2007 DG_{75}	—	February 21, 2007	Mount Lemmon	Mount Lemmon Survey	MAS	550 m	MPC · JPL
829732	2007 DK_{78}	—	February 23, 2007	Mount Lemmon	Mount Lemmon Survey	MAS	460 m	MPC · JPL
829733	2007 DW_{91}	—	February 6, 2007	Kitt Peak	Spacewatch	·	1.8 km	MPC · JPL
829734	2007 DA_{112}	—	February 26, 2007	Mount Lemmon	Mount Lemmon Survey	TIR	2.0 km	MPC · JPL
829735	2007 DD_{119}	—	February 21, 2007	Mount Lemmon	Mount Lemmon Survey	·	2.0 km	MPC · JPL
829736	2007 DA_{121}	—	June 29, 2010	WISE	WISE	·	2.2 km	MPC · JPL
829737	2007 DP_{121}	—	October 10, 2016	Haleakala	Pan-STARRS 1	TIR	2.2 km	MPC · JPL
829738	2007 DD_{122}	—	February 25, 2007	Kitt Peak	Spacewatch	·	470 m	MPC · JPL
829739	2007 DO_{122}	—	August 18, 2014	Haleakala	Pan-STARRS 1	·	1.2 km	MPC · JPL
829740	2007 DP_{122}	—	February 23, 2007	Kitt Peak	Spacewatch	·	750 m	MPC · JPL
829741	2007 DO_{125}	—	June 11, 2010	WISE	WISE	EUP	2.9 km	MPC · JPL
829742	2007 DV_{127}	—	February 17, 2007	Kitt Peak	Spacewatch	·	440 m	MPC · JPL
829743	2007 DH_{128}	—	February 23, 2007	Kitt Peak	Spacewatch	BAR	720 m	MPC · JPL
829744	2007 DN_{129}	—	February 27, 2007	Kitt Peak	Spacewatch	EOS	1.5 km	MPC · JPL
829745	2007 DB_{130}	—	February 23, 2007	Mount Lemmon	Mount Lemmon Survey	·	1.5 km	MPC · JPL
829746	2007 DM_{130}	—	February 22, 2007	Kitt Peak	Spacewatch	·	2.2 km	MPC · JPL
829747	2007 DZ_{130}	—	February 27, 2007	Kitt Peak	Spacewatch	·	1.2 km	MPC · JPL
829748	2007 DM_{133}	—	February 25, 2007	Mount Lemmon	Mount Lemmon Survey	MAS	530 m	MPC · JPL
829749	2007 DW_{134}	—	February 23, 2007	Mount Lemmon	Mount Lemmon Survey	·	750 m	MPC · JPL
829750	2007 EF_{3}	—	February 21, 2007	Kitt Peak	Spacewatch	·	740 m	MPC · JPL
829751	2007 EB_{5}	—	February 22, 2007	Kitt Peak	Spacewatch	·	430 m	MPC · JPL
829752	2007 EL_{20}	—	August 15, 2004	Cerro Tololo	Deep Ecliptic Survey	·	2.6 km	MPC · JPL
829753	2007 EA_{23}	—	March 10, 2007	Mount Lemmon	Mount Lemmon Survey	·	950 m	MPC · JPL
829754	2007 EP_{37}	—	March 11, 2007	Mount Lemmon	Mount Lemmon Survey	·	1.7 km	MPC · JPL
829755	2007 ES_{41}	—	March 9, 2007	Mount Lemmon	Mount Lemmon Survey	HNS	980 m	MPC · JPL
829756	2007 EQ_{58}	—	February 6, 2007	Kitt Peak	Spacewatch	·	1.9 km	MPC · JPL
829757	2007 EB_{60}	—	March 9, 2007	Mount Lemmon	Mount Lemmon Survey	H	270 m	MPC · JPL
829758	2007 EY_{65}	—	March 10, 2007	Kitt Peak	Spacewatch	·	990 m	MPC · JPL
829759	2007 EK_{67}	—	March 10, 2007	Kitt Peak	Spacewatch	·	1.8 km	MPC · JPL
829760	2007 EC_{100}	—	March 11, 2007	Kitt Peak	Spacewatch	·	1.0 km	MPC · JPL
829761	2007 EW_{122}	—	March 14, 2007	Mount Lemmon	Mount Lemmon Survey	·	1.8 km	MPC · JPL
829762	2007 EP_{128}	—	March 9, 2007	Mount Lemmon	Mount Lemmon Survey	·	2.2 km	MPC · JPL
829763	2007 EK_{136}	—	March 10, 2007	Mount Lemmon	Mount Lemmon Survey	THB	1.9 km	MPC · JPL
829764	2007 ES_{143}	—	March 12, 2007	Kitt Peak	Spacewatch	·	600 m	MPC · JPL
829765	2007 EX_{172}	—	March 14, 2007	Kitt Peak	Spacewatch	·	1.7 km	MPC · JPL
829766	2007 EJ_{178}	—	September 24, 1960	Palomar Mountain	C. J. van Houten, I. van Houten-Groeneveld, T. Gehrels	·	2.8 km	MPC · JPL
829767	2007 ED_{190}	—	March 13, 2007	Mount Lemmon	Mount Lemmon Survey	·	590 m	MPC · JPL
829768	2007 ER_{196}	—	March 15, 2007	Kitt Peak	Spacewatch	·	910 m	MPC · JPL
829769	2007 EG_{228}	—	March 11, 2007	Kitt Peak	Spacewatch	NYS	980 m	MPC · JPL
829770	2007 EF_{229}	—	March 11, 2007	Kitt Peak	Spacewatch	·	520 m	MPC · JPL
829771	2007 EV_{231}	—	May 24, 2011	Haleakala	Pan-STARRS 1	MAS	510 m	MPC · JPL
829772	2007 ED_{233}	—	November 20, 2009	Kitt Peak	Spacewatch	·	550 m	MPC · JPL
829773	2007 ES_{233}	—	March 19, 2018	Mount Lemmon	Mount Lemmon Survey	·	1.7 km	MPC · JPL
829774	2007 EV_{234}	—	February 27, 2014	Mount Lemmon	Mount Lemmon Survey	·	700 m	MPC · JPL
829775	2007 EX_{234}	—	March 20, 1999	Sacramento Peak	SDSS	·	770 m	MPC · JPL
829776	2007 EV_{238}	—	March 12, 2007	Kitt Peak	Spacewatch	·	950 m	MPC · JPL
829777	2007 EZ_{242}	—	March 10, 2007	Mount Lemmon	Mount Lemmon Survey	·	850 m	MPC · JPL
829778	2007 ES_{244}	—	March 12, 2007	Mount Lemmon	Mount Lemmon Survey	·	1.2 km	MPC · JPL
829779	2007 FG_{2}	—	March 11, 2007	Anderson Mesa	LONEOS	·	960 m	MPC · JPL
829780	2007 FE_{14}	—	March 19, 2007	Mount Lemmon	Mount Lemmon Survey	·	1.3 km	MPC · JPL
829781	2007 FT_{14}	—	March 19, 2007	Mount Lemmon	Mount Lemmon Survey	·	1.0 km	MPC · JPL
829782	2007 FG_{21}	—	February 21, 2007	Mount Lemmon	Mount Lemmon Survey	NYS	720 m	MPC · JPL
829783	2007 FC_{27}	—	March 9, 2007	Kitt Peak	Spacewatch	·	1.4 km	MPC · JPL
829784	2007 FF_{27}	—	February 23, 2007	Mount Lemmon	Mount Lemmon Survey	NYS	700 m	MPC · JPL
829785	2007 FD_{28}	—	February 19, 2007	Mount Lemmon	Mount Lemmon Survey	·	890 m	MPC · JPL
829786	2007 FE_{34}	—	March 9, 2007	Mount Lemmon	Mount Lemmon Survey	·	870 m	MPC · JPL
829787	2007 FR_{37}	—	October 23, 2003	Kitt Peak	Deep Ecliptic Survey	·	2.6 km	MPC · JPL
829788	2007 FH_{45}	—	March 10, 2007	Kitt Peak	Spacewatch	·	1.3 km	MPC · JPL
829789	2007 FD_{52}	—	March 26, 2007	Kitt Peak	Spacewatch	·	1.7 km	MPC · JPL
829790	2007 FG_{55}	—	June 3, 2011	Mount Lemmon	Mount Lemmon Survey	·	860 m	MPC · JPL
829791	2007 FW_{57}	—	March 18, 2018	Haleakala	Pan-STARRS 1	NYS	640 m	MPC · JPL
829792	2007 FN_{59}	—	March 20, 2007	Mount Lemmon	Mount Lemmon Survey	NYS	690 m	MPC · JPL
829793	2007 FA_{60}	—	March 20, 2007	Kitt Peak	Spacewatch	·	400 m	MPC · JPL
829794	2007 FF_{61}	—	March 26, 2007	Kitt Peak	Spacewatch	TIR	1.7 km	MPC · JPL
829795	2007 FM_{61}	—	March 25, 2007	Mount Lemmon	Mount Lemmon Survey	·	2.3 km	MPC · JPL
829796	2007 FC_{62}	—	March 19, 2007	Mount Lemmon	Mount Lemmon Survey	·	850 m	MPC · JPL
829797	2007 FJ_{63}	—	March 16, 2007	Mount Lemmon	Mount Lemmon Survey	·	520 m	MPC · JPL
829798	2007 FO_{63}	—	March 29, 2007	Kitt Peak	Spacewatch	·	530 m	MPC · JPL
829799	2007 FR_{64}	—	March 19, 2007	Mount Lemmon	Mount Lemmon Survey	EUP	2.5 km	MPC · JPL
829800	2007 FT_{64}	—	March 16, 2007	Mount Lemmon	Mount Lemmon Survey	THM	1.7 km	MPC · JPL

== 829801–829900 ==
back to top

Designation			Discovery			Properties		Ref
Permanent	Provisional	Named after	Date	Site	Discoverer(s)	Category	Diam.	Ref
829801	2007 FY_{64}	—	March 20, 2007	Kitt Peak	Spacewatch	EUN	710 m	MPC · JPL
829802	2007 GO_{1}	—	April 8, 2007	Bergisch Gladbach	W. Bickel	·	470 m	MPC · JPL
829803	2007 GM_{15}	—	March 12, 2007	Kitt Peak	Spacewatch	·	950 m	MPC · JPL
829804	2007 GR_{30}	—	April 14, 2007	Mount Lemmon	Mount Lemmon Survey	PHO	560 m	MPC · JPL
829805	2007 GZ_{43}	—	March 14, 2007	Kitt Peak	Spacewatch	·	2.3 km	MPC · JPL
829806	2007 GU_{48}	—	April 14, 2007	Kitt Peak	Spacewatch	H	390 m	MPC · JPL
829807	2007 GB_{53}	—	April 14, 2007	Mount Lemmon	Mount Lemmon Survey	ADE	1.5 km	MPC · JPL
829808	2007 GT_{59}	—	April 15, 2007	Kitt Peak	Spacewatch	·	470 m	MPC · JPL
829809	2007 GZ_{59}	—	April 15, 2007	Kitt Peak	Spacewatch	·	500 m	MPC · JPL
829810	2007 GW_{68}	—	March 26, 2007	Mount Lemmon	Mount Lemmon Survey	EUN	760 m	MPC · JPL
829811	2007 GJ_{70}	—	April 15, 2007	Mount Lemmon	Mount Lemmon Survey	BRA	1 km	MPC · JPL
829812	2007 GA_{73}	—	March 11, 2007	Catalina	CSS	(895)	4.0 km	MPC · JPL
829813	2007 GN_{75}	—	April 7, 2007	Mount Lemmon	Mount Lemmon Survey	MAS	550 m	MPC · JPL
829814	2007 GM_{77}	—	April 15, 2007	Kitt Peak	Spacewatch	·	2.3 km	MPC · JPL
829815	2007 GR_{78}	—	April 15, 2012	Haleakala	Pan-STARRS 1	H	350 m	MPC · JPL
829816	2007 GP_{79}	—	April 30, 2011	Kitt Peak	Spacewatch	·	1.0 km	MPC · JPL
829817	2007 GU_{79}	—	August 14, 2015	Haleakala	Pan-STARRS 1	·	890 m	MPC · JPL
829818	2007 GF_{80}	—	April 11, 2007	Mount Lemmon	Mount Lemmon Survey	HYG	2.1 km	MPC · JPL
829819	2007 GN_{82}	—	April 7, 2007	Mount Lemmon	Mount Lemmon Survey	MAR	650 m	MPC · JPL
829820	2007 GS_{82}	—	April 14, 2007	Mount Lemmon	Mount Lemmon Survey	EUN	930 m	MPC · JPL
829821	2007 HF	—	April 16, 2007	7300	W. K. Y. Yeung	·	2.0 km	MPC · JPL
829822	2007 HC_{10}	—	April 18, 2007	Mount Lemmon	Mount Lemmon Survey	·	1.7 km	MPC · JPL
829823	2007 HE_{11}	—	April 18, 2007	Kitt Peak	Spacewatch	·	2.1 km	MPC · JPL
829824	2007 HL_{25}	—	April 18, 2007	Mount Lemmon	Mount Lemmon Survey	·	900 m	MPC · JPL
829825	2007 HX_{28}	—	March 13, 2007	Mount Lemmon	Mount Lemmon Survey	·	1.9 km	MPC · JPL
829826	2007 HY_{30}	—	July 18, 2002	Palomar	NEAT	·	2.2 km	MPC · JPL
829827	2007 HR_{31}	—	April 19, 2007	Kitt Peak	Spacewatch	·	480 m	MPC · JPL
829828	2007 HW_{31}	—	April 19, 2007	Kitt Peak	Spacewatch	·	490 m	MPC · JPL
829829	2007 HS_{33}	—	April 11, 2007	Kitt Peak	Spacewatch	·	530 m	MPC · JPL
829830	2007 HB_{45}	—	March 13, 2007	Mount Lemmon	Mount Lemmon Survey	MAS	620 m	MPC · JPL
829831	2007 HF_{63}	—	April 22, 2007	Mount Lemmon	Mount Lemmon Survey	·	990 m	MPC · JPL
829832	2007 HF_{66}	—	April 22, 2007	Mount Lemmon	Mount Lemmon Survey	·	1.1 km	MPC · JPL
829833	2007 HR_{66}	—	April 22, 2007	Mount Lemmon	Mount Lemmon Survey	T_{j} (2.99) · EUP	3.2 km	MPC · JPL
829834	2007 HG_{82}	—	April 25, 2007	Mount Lemmon	Mount Lemmon Survey	·	1.5 km	MPC · JPL
829835	2007 HX_{94}	—	April 19, 2007	Kitt Peak	Spacewatch	·	500 m	MPC · JPL
829836	2007 HE_{105}	—	December 23, 2016	Haleakala	Pan-STARRS 1	L5	6.4 km	MPC · JPL
829837	2007 HK_{106}	—	November 28, 2014	Mount Lemmon	Mount Lemmon Survey	·	1.9 km	MPC · JPL
829838	2007 HD_{107}	—	October 23, 2015	Mount Lemmon	Mount Lemmon Survey	·	2.4 km	MPC · JPL
829839	2007 HX_{107}	—	July 28, 2014	Haleakala	Pan-STARRS 1	EOS	1.5 km	MPC · JPL
829840	2007 HZ_{107}	—	April 22, 2007	Kitt Peak	Spacewatch	EOS	1.4 km	MPC · JPL
829841	2007 HW_{108}	—	April 3, 2011	Mayhill-ISON	L. Elenin	·	1.2 km	MPC · JPL
829842	2007 HM_{110}	—	April 25, 2007	Mount Lemmon	Mount Lemmon Survey	·	1.0 km	MPC · JPL
829843	2007 HG_{111}	—	April 25, 2007	Kitt Peak	Spacewatch	·	940 m	MPC · JPL
829844	2007 HP_{113}	—	September 17, 2020	Haleakala	Pan-STARRS 2	·	2.2 km	MPC · JPL
829845	2007 HT_{113}	—	April 24, 2007	Mount Lemmon	Mount Lemmon Survey	·	1.3 km	MPC · JPL
829846	2007 HQ_{115}	—	April 25, 2007	Mount Lemmon	Mount Lemmon Survey	LIX	2.4 km	MPC · JPL
829847	2007 HV_{115}	—	April 19, 2007	Kitt Peak	Spacewatch	·	2.3 km	MPC · JPL
829848	2007 JH_{7}	—	May 9, 2007	Mount Lemmon	Mount Lemmon Survey	(5)	760 m	MPC · JPL
829849	2007 JY_{14}	—	May 10, 2007	Mount Lemmon	Mount Lemmon Survey	·	940 m	MPC · JPL
829850	2007 JK_{15}	—	April 26, 2007	Kitt Peak	Spacewatch	·	2.5 km	MPC · JPL
829851	2007 JN_{24}	—	April 25, 2007	Mount Lemmon	Mount Lemmon Survey	·	550 m	MPC · JPL
829852	2007 JW_{24}	—	May 9, 2007	Mount Lemmon	Mount Lemmon Survey	·	2.5 km	MPC · JPL
829853	2007 JH_{26}	—	May 9, 2007	Kitt Peak	Spacewatch	·	1.2 km	MPC · JPL
829854	2007 JV_{29}	—	May 11, 2007	Mount Lemmon	Mount Lemmon Survey	·	2.5 km	MPC · JPL
829855	2007 JV_{32}	—	May 12, 2007	Mount Lemmon	Mount Lemmon Survey	·	510 m	MPC · JPL
829856	2007 JY_{46}	—	May 10, 2007	Mount Lemmon	Mount Lemmon Survey	·	1.3 km	MPC · JPL
829857	2007 JC_{50}	—	May 11, 2007	Mount Lemmon	Mount Lemmon Survey	·	860 m	MPC · JPL
829858	2007 JR_{50}	—	March 28, 2011	Kitt Peak	Spacewatch	BAR	1.1 km	MPC · JPL
829859	2007 KJ_{2}	—	May 18, 2007	Charleston	R. Holmes	·	2.1 km	MPC · JPL
829860	2007 KA_{12}	—	May 25, 2007	Mount Lemmon	Mount Lemmon Survey	EUN	820 m	MPC · JPL
829861	2007 KG_{12}	—	May 26, 2007	Mount Lemmon	Mount Lemmon Survey	·	1.6 km	MPC · JPL
829862	2007 LP_{4}	—	May 11, 2007	Mount Lemmon	Mount Lemmon Survey	·	610 m	MPC · JPL
829863	2007 LB_{6}	—	April 24, 2007	Mount Lemmon	Mount Lemmon Survey	·	1.2 km	MPC · JPL
829864	2007 LB_{31}	—	June 12, 2007	Mauna Kea	D. D. Balam, K. M. Perrett	·	2.2 km	MPC · JPL
829865	2007 LF_{35}	—	April 24, 2007	Mount Lemmon	Mount Lemmon Survey	·	1.2 km	MPC · JPL
829866	2007 LX_{39}	—	June 15, 2007	Kitt Peak	Spacewatch	·	2.4 km	MPC · JPL
829867	2007 MT_{1}	—	April 15, 2007	Mount Lemmon	Mount Lemmon Survey	TIR	2.0 km	MPC · JPL
829868	2007 ML_{9}	—	May 11, 2007	Mount Lemmon	Mount Lemmon Survey	·	600 m	MPC · JPL
829869	2007 MQ_{9}	—	June 19, 2007	Kitt Peak	Spacewatch	·	2.6 km	MPC · JPL
829870	2007 MQ_{13}	—	May 13, 2007	Kitt Peak	Spacewatch	·	1.3 km	MPC · JPL
829871	2007 MW_{22}	—	June 22, 2007	Kitt Peak	Spacewatch	·	1.1 km	MPC · JPL
829872	2007 MR_{23}	—	June 22, 2007	Kitt Peak	Spacewatch	·	1.3 km	MPC · JPL
829873	2007 MK_{26}	—	June 16, 2007	Kitt Peak	Spacewatch	·	1.1 km	MPC · JPL
829874	2007 ML_{28}	—	September 26, 2011	Haleakala	Pan-STARRS 1	·	940 m	MPC · JPL
829875	2007 NX_{1}	—	July 13, 2007	La Sagra	OAM	·	2.4 km	MPC · JPL
829876	2007 OS_{6}	—	July 19, 2007	Siding Spring	SSS	T_{j} (2.82)	2.0 km	MPC · JPL
829877	2007 OE_{9}	—	July 24, 2007	Mauna Kea	D. D. Balam, K. M. Perrett	·	950 m	MPC · JPL
829878	2007 PN_{8}	—	August 10, 2007	Crimea-Nauchnyi	Rumyantsev, V., Biryukov, V.	PHO	750 m	MPC · JPL
829879	2007 PM_{11}	—	August 9, 2007	Kitt Peak	Spacewatch	·	1.3 km	MPC · JPL
829880	2007 PV_{15}	—	August 8, 2007	Socorro	LINEAR	·	1.5 km	MPC · JPL
829881	2007 PQ_{25}	—	October 16, 2003	Palomar	NEAT	·	1.0 km	MPC · JPL
829882	2007 PY_{28}	—	August 12, 2007	Socorro	LINEAR	·	900 m	MPC · JPL
829883	2007 PC_{39}	—	August 13, 2007	Anderson Mesa	LONEOS	BAR	1.5 km	MPC · JPL
829884	2007 PR_{42}	—	August 11, 2007	Socorro	LINEAR	·	1.1 km	MPC · JPL
829885	2007 PR_{43}	—	September 20, 2003	Campo Imperatore	CINEOS	·	1.2 km	MPC · JPL
829886	2007 PS_{44}	—	August 12, 2007	Palomar Mountain	M. E. Schwamb, M. E. Brown	·	590 m	MPC · JPL
829887	2007 PC_{52}	—	April 29, 2014	Haleakala	Pan-STARRS 1	·	900 m	MPC · JPL
829888	2007 PQ_{56}	—	August 9, 2007	Kitt Peak	Spacewatch	·	2.3 km	MPC · JPL
829889	2007 QL_{14}	—	August 23, 2007	Kitt Peak	Spacewatch	(5)	920 m	MPC · JPL
829890	2007 QA_{19}	—	August 23, 2007	Kitt Peak	Spacewatch	·	1.5 km	MPC · JPL
829891	2007 QR_{20}	—	August 23, 2007	Kitt Peak	Spacewatch	·	1.6 km	MPC · JPL
829892	2007 RA_{1}	—	September 3, 2007	Eskridge	G. Hug	JUN	720 m	MPC · JPL
829893	2007 RE_{8}	—	September 5, 2007	Marly	P. Kocher	·	1.6 km	MPC · JPL
829894	2007 RS_{13}	—	September 11, 2007	Catalina	CSS	·	1.9 km	MPC · JPL
829895	2007 RZ_{23}	—	September 3, 2007	Catalina	CSS	·	1.5 km	MPC · JPL
829896	2007 RJ_{24}	—	September 3, 2007	Catalina	CSS	·	1.3 km	MPC · JPL
829897	2007 RQ_{33}	—	September 5, 2007	Catalina	CSS	·	530 m	MPC · JPL
829898	2007 RR_{34}	—	September 6, 2007	Anderson Mesa	LONEOS	EUN	1.1 km	MPC · JPL
829899	2007 RY_{36}	—	September 8, 2007	Anderson Mesa	LONEOS	·	1.6 km	MPC · JPL
829900	2007 RG_{42}	—	September 9, 2007	Kitt Peak	Spacewatch	·	2.0 km	MPC · JPL

== 829901–830000 ==
back to top

Designation			Discovery			Properties		Ref
Permanent	Provisional	Named after	Date	Site	Discoverer(s)	Category	Diam.	Ref
829901	2007 RK_{56}	—	September 9, 2007	Kitt Peak	Spacewatch	·	510 m	MPC · JPL
829902	2007 RX_{61}	—	September 10, 2007	Mount Lemmon	Mount Lemmon Survey	·	1.2 km	MPC · JPL
829903	2007 RK_{62}	—	September 10, 2007	Mount Lemmon	Mount Lemmon Survey	T_{j} (2.99) · EUP	3.3 km	MPC · JPL
829904	2007 RC_{73}	—	September 10, 2007	Mount Lemmon	Mount Lemmon Survey	NYS	830 m	MPC · JPL
829905	2007 RN_{74}	—	September 10, 2007	Mount Lemmon	Mount Lemmon Survey	TIN	680 m	MPC · JPL
829906	2007 RZ_{74}	—	August 10, 2007	Kitt Peak	Spacewatch	KOR	930 m	MPC · JPL
829907	2007 RR_{79}	—	August 24, 2007	Kitt Peak	Spacewatch	·	1.4 km	MPC · JPL
829908	2007 RV_{82}	—	September 10, 2007	Mount Lemmon	Mount Lemmon Survey	·	1.3 km	MPC · JPL
829909	2007 RG_{88}	—	September 10, 2007	Mount Lemmon	Mount Lemmon Survey	·	1.5 km	MPC · JPL
829910	2007 RV_{89}	—	September 10, 2007	Mount Lemmon	Mount Lemmon Survey	·	2.2 km	MPC · JPL
829911	2007 RD_{114}	—	September 11, 2007	Kitt Peak	Spacewatch	·	1.5 km	MPC · JPL
829912	2007 RG_{120}	—	September 13, 2007	Catalina	CSS	·	1.5 km	MPC · JPL
829913	2007 RU_{124}	—	September 12, 2007	Mount Lemmon	Mount Lemmon Survey	·	880 m	MPC · JPL
829914	2007 RF_{125}	—	September 12, 2007	Mount Lemmon	Mount Lemmon Survey	·	1.5 km	MPC · JPL
829915	2007 RJ_{126}	—	September 12, 2007	Mount Lemmon	Mount Lemmon Survey	·	1.4 km	MPC · JPL
829916	2007 RG_{127}	—	September 12, 2007	Mount Lemmon	Mount Lemmon Survey	NYS	610 m	MPC · JPL
829917	2007 RD_{131}	—	September 12, 2007	Kitt Peak	Spacewatch	·	1.2 km	MPC · JPL
829918	2007 RN_{136}	—	September 14, 2007	Mount Lemmon	Mount Lemmon Survey	VER	2.3 km	MPC · JPL
829919	2007 RK_{137}	—	March 31, 2019	Mount Lemmon	Mount Lemmon Survey	·	470 m	MPC · JPL
829920	2007 RP_{146}	—	September 14, 2007	Mount Lemmon	Mount Lemmon Survey	·	820 m	MPC · JPL
829921	2007 RM_{147}	—	September 11, 2007	XuYi	PMO NEO Survey Program	·	1.6 km	MPC · JPL
829922	2007 RU_{147}	—	September 11, 2007	XuYi	PMO NEO Survey Program	·	1.6 km	MPC · JPL
829923	2007 RQ_{153}	—	June 16, 2007	Kitt Peak	Spacewatch	·	590 m	MPC · JPL
829924	2007 RJ_{157}	—	August 10, 2007	Kitt Peak	Spacewatch	·	1.2 km	MPC · JPL
829925	2007 RB_{161}	—	September 13, 2007	Mount Lemmon	Mount Lemmon Survey	·	780 m	MPC · JPL
829926	2007 RA_{168}	—	September 10, 2007	Kitt Peak	Spacewatch	·	2.3 km	MPC · JPL
829927	2007 RF_{172}	—	September 10, 2007	Kitt Peak	Spacewatch	·	910 m	MPC · JPL
829928	2007 RX_{176}	—	September 10, 2007	Mount Lemmon	Mount Lemmon Survey	·	700 m	MPC · JPL
829929	2007 RH_{181}	—	September 11, 2007	Mount Lemmon	Mount Lemmon Survey	MRX	660 m	MPC · JPL
829930	2007 RC_{182}	—	September 12, 2007	Mount Lemmon	Mount Lemmon Survey	·	1.7 km	MPC · JPL
829931	2007 RZ_{182}	—	September 12, 2007	Mount Lemmon	Mount Lemmon Survey	·	600 m	MPC · JPL
829932	2007 RK_{183}	—	March 12, 2005	Kitt Peak	Deep Ecliptic Survey	·	1.6 km	MPC · JPL
829933	2007 RA_{207}	—	September 10, 2007	Kitt Peak	Spacewatch	AEO	900 m	MPC · JPL
829934	2007 RW_{207}	—	September 10, 2007	Kitt Peak	Spacewatch	NYS	890 m	MPC · JPL
829935	2007 RX_{211}	—	September 11, 2007	Kitt Peak	Spacewatch	·	910 m	MPC · JPL
829936	2007 RG_{212}	—	September 11, 2007	Kitt Peak	Spacewatch	·	750 m	MPC · JPL
829937	2007 RW_{215}	—	September 12, 2007	Kitt Peak	Spacewatch	DOR	1.5 km	MPC · JPL
829938	2007 RR_{229}	—	September 11, 2007	Kitt Peak	Spacewatch	MAS	550 m	MPC · JPL
829939	2007 RG_{235}	—	September 12, 2007	Mount Lemmon	Mount Lemmon Survey	AGN	800 m	MPC · JPL
829940	2007 RA_{238}	—	September 14, 2007	Kitt Peak	Spacewatch	AEO	820 m	MPC · JPL
829941	2007 RP_{243}	—	June 22, 2007	Mount Lemmon	Mount Lemmon Survey	·	2.9 km	MPC · JPL
829942	2007 RC_{247}	—	September 12, 2007	Catalina	CSS	CLO	1.8 km	MPC · JPL
829943	2007 RM_{252}	—	September 13, 2007	Mount Lemmon	Mount Lemmon Survey	·	2.1 km	MPC · JPL
829944	2007 RT_{252}	—	September 13, 2007	Mount Lemmon	Mount Lemmon Survey	·	1.1 km	MPC · JPL
829945	2007 RK_{266}	—	September 15, 2007	Mount Lemmon	Mount Lemmon Survey	·	2.9 km	MPC · JPL
829946	2007 RW_{268}	—	September 15, 2007	Kitt Peak	Spacewatch	·	1.2 km	MPC · JPL
829947	2007 RY_{270}	—	September 15, 2007	Kitt Peak	Spacewatch	·	990 m	MPC · JPL
829948	2007 RF_{276}	—	February 15, 2010	Kitt Peak	Spacewatch	·	2.8 km	MPC · JPL
829949	2007 RO_{288}	—	September 13, 2007	Mount Lemmon	Mount Lemmon Survey	·	700 m	MPC · JPL
829950	2007 RR_{288}	—	September 15, 2007	Kitt Peak	Spacewatch	·	2.2 km	MPC · JPL
829951	2007 RO_{300}	—	September 14, 2007	Kitt Peak	Spacewatch	·	1.4 km	MPC · JPL
829952	2007 RU_{302}	—	September 12, 2007	Mount Lemmon	Mount Lemmon Survey	·	1.1 km	MPC · JPL
829953	2007 RK_{306}	—	September 14, 2007	Mauna Kea	P. A. Wiegert	LIX	2.5 km	MPC · JPL
829954	2007 RW_{316}	—	September 9, 2007	Kitt Peak	Spacewatch	·	2.3 km	MPC · JPL
829955	2007 RF_{320}	—	September 13, 2007	Kitt Peak	Spacewatch	·	2.7 km	MPC · JPL
829956	2007 RN_{320}	—	September 13, 2007	Mount Lemmon	Mount Lemmon Survey	·	1.4 km	MPC · JPL
829957	2007 RT_{327}	—	September 11, 2007	Mount Lemmon	Mount Lemmon Survey	·	1.4 km	MPC · JPL
829958	2007 RB_{329}	—	September 13, 2007	Mount Lemmon	Mount Lemmon Survey	·	1.6 km	MPC · JPL
829959	2007 RY_{330}	—	September 12, 2007	Mount Lemmon	Mount Lemmon Survey	MIS	1.7 km	MPC · JPL
829960	2007 RU_{331}	—	October 5, 2002	Sacramento Peak	SDSS	KOR	990 m	MPC · JPL
829961	2007 RR_{334}	—	September 12, 2007	Anderson Mesa	LONEOS	·	650 m	MPC · JPL
829962	2007 RG_{336}	—	September 6, 2013	Mount Lemmon	Mount Lemmon Survey	·	2.1 km	MPC · JPL
829963	2007 RP_{337}	—	September 7, 2008	Mount Lemmon	Mount Lemmon Survey	·	3.4 km	MPC · JPL
829964	2007 RM_{339}	—	September 12, 2015	Haleakala	Pan-STARRS 1	·	640 m	MPC · JPL
829965	2007 RJ_{341}	—	February 16, 2010	Kitt Peak	Spacewatch	·	1.1 km	MPC · JPL
829966	2007 RB_{343}	—	April 5, 2014	Haleakala	Pan-STARRS 1	NYS	750 m	MPC · JPL
829967	2007 RJ_{343}	—	March 10, 2011	Kitt Peak	Spacewatch	H	340 m	MPC · JPL
829968	2007 RZ_{344}	—	September 13, 2007	Catalina	CSS	·	790 m	MPC · JPL
829969	2007 RD_{345}	—	July 13, 2018	Haleakala	Pan-STARRS 1	·	2.4 km	MPC · JPL
829970	2007 RN_{345}	—	January 16, 2015	Haleakala	Pan-STARRS 1	EOS	1.3 km	MPC · JPL
829971	2007 RQ_{351}	—	January 16, 2015	Haleakala	Pan-STARRS 1	·	1.9 km	MPC · JPL
829972	2007 RU_{351}	—	May 16, 2010	WISE	WISE	·	3.4 km	MPC · JPL
829973	2007 RE_{352}	—	March 20, 1999	Sacramento Peak	SDSS	·	2.3 km	MPC · JPL
829974	2007 RZ_{352}	—	September 10, 2007	Mount Lemmon	Mount Lemmon Survey	·	750 m	MPC · JPL
829975	2007 RM_{355}	—	September 15, 2007	Kitt Peak	Spacewatch	·	1.1 km	MPC · JPL
829976	2007 RN_{356}	—	September 15, 2007	Mount Lemmon	Mount Lemmon Survey	·	1.2 km	MPC · JPL
829977	2007 RX_{356}	—	September 15, 2007	Mount Lemmon	Mount Lemmon Survey	·	2.3 km	MPC · JPL
829978	2007 RD_{357}	—	September 19, 1998	Sacramento Peak	SDSS	·	1.3 km	MPC · JPL
829979	2007 RL_{357}	—	September 13, 2007	Mount Lemmon	Mount Lemmon Survey	·	1.4 km	MPC · JPL
829980	2007 RE_{358}	—	September 9, 2007	Kitt Peak	Spacewatch	·	1.5 km	MPC · JPL
829981	2007 RG_{360}	—	September 13, 2007	Mount Lemmon	Mount Lemmon Survey	·	1.2 km	MPC · JPL
829982	2007 RA_{363}	—	September 10, 2007	Mount Lemmon	Mount Lemmon Survey	JUN	560 m	MPC · JPL
829983	2007 RJ_{365}	—	September 10, 2007	Mount Lemmon	Mount Lemmon Survey	·	880 m	MPC · JPL
829984	2007 RK_{368}	—	September 12, 2007	Mount Lemmon	Mount Lemmon Survey	·	1.8 km	MPC · JPL
829985	2007 RA_{369}	—	September 14, 2007	Mount Lemmon	Mount Lemmon Survey	·	1.3 km	MPC · JPL
829986	2007 RJ_{369}	—	September 13, 2007	Mount Lemmon	Mount Lemmon Survey	·	1.1 km	MPC · JPL
829987	2007 RE_{371}	—	September 12, 2007	Mount Lemmon	Mount Lemmon Survey	·	770 m	MPC · JPL
829988	2007 RN_{373}	—	September 15, 2007	Mount Lemmon	Mount Lemmon Survey	AGN	850 m	MPC · JPL
829989	2007 RW_{373}	—	September 11, 2007	Mount Lemmon	Mount Lemmon Survey	·	1.5 km	MPC · JPL
829990	2007 RY_{373}	—	September 12, 2007	Mount Lemmon	Mount Lemmon Survey	·	1.3 km	MPC · JPL
829991	2007 RH_{374}	—	September 10, 2007	Kitt Peak	Spacewatch	·	1.1 km	MPC · JPL
829992	2007 RM_{374}	—	September 13, 2007	Kitt Peak	Spacewatch	HYG	1.8 km	MPC · JPL
829993	2007 RQ_{375}	—	September 10, 2007	Mount Lemmon	Mount Lemmon Survey	·	1.3 km	MPC · JPL
829994	2007 RS_{375}	—	September 12, 2007	Mount Lemmon	Mount Lemmon Survey	·	990 m	MPC · JPL
829995	2007 RW_{375}	—	September 15, 2007	Mount Lemmon	Mount Lemmon Survey	·	1.3 km	MPC · JPL
829996	2007 RE_{376}	—	September 10, 2007	Kitt Peak	Spacewatch	·	1.4 km	MPC · JPL
829997	2007 RD_{377}	—	September 9, 2007	Kitt Peak	Spacewatch	·	520 m	MPC · JPL
829998	2007 RM_{377}	—	September 13, 2007	Mount Lemmon	Mount Lemmon Survey	·	2.1 km	MPC · JPL
829999	2007 RH_{380}	—	September 11, 2007	Mount Lemmon	Mount Lemmon Survey	·	1.9 km	MPC · JPL
830000	2007 RL_{381}	—	September 10, 2007	Kitt Peak	Spacewatch	·	1.8 km	MPC · JPL

back to top
