= List of minor planets: 508001–509000 =

The following is a partial list of minor planets, running from minor-planet number 508001 through 509000, inclusive. The primary data for this and other partial lists is based on JPL's "Small-Body Orbital Elements" and data available from the Minor Planet Center. Critical list information is also provided by the MPC, unless otherwise specified from Lowell Observatory. A detailed description of the table's columns and additional sources are given on the main page including a complete list of every page in this series, and a statistical break-up on the dynamical classification of minor planets.

Also see the summary list of all named bodies in numerical and alphabetical order, and the corresponding naming citations for the number range of this particular list. New namings may only be added to this list after official publication, as the preannouncement of names is condemned by the Working Group for Small Bodies Nomenclature of the International Astronomical Union.

Near-Earth obj.	MBA (inner)	MBA (outer)	Centaur
Mars-crosser	MBA (middle)	Jupiter trojan	Trans-Neptunian obj.
Unclassified

== 508001–508100 ==
Designation			Discovery			Properties		Ref
Permanent	Provisional	Named after	Date	Site	Discoverer(s)	Category	Diam.	Ref
508001	2015 BL_{254}	—	January 15, 2008	Kitt Peak	Spacewatch	·	570 m	MPC · JPL
508002	2015 BM_{258}	—	March 13, 2008	Kitt Peak	Spacewatch	V	580 m	MPC · JPL
508003	2015 BC_{259}	—	December 18, 2007	Mount Lemmon	Mount Lemmon Survey	·	650 m	MPC · JPL
508004	2015 BP_{260}	—	February 1, 2006	Mount Lemmon	Mount Lemmon Survey	HOF	2.5 km	MPC · JPL
508005	2015 BK_{276}	—	August 22, 2004	Kitt Peak	Spacewatch	·	1.6 km	MPC · JPL
508006	2015 BQ_{297}	—	November 11, 2006	Mount Lemmon	Mount Lemmon Survey	NYS	990 m	MPC · JPL
508007	2015 BU_{299}	—	December 26, 2006	Kitt Peak	Spacewatch	NYS	1.0 km	MPC · JPL
508008	2015 BE_{301}	—	April 29, 2003	Kitt Peak	Spacewatch	·	1.2 km	MPC · JPL
508009	2015 BX_{303}	—	May 1, 1997	Kitt Peak	Spacewatch	·	1.8 km	MPC · JPL
508010	2015 BM_{304}	—	October 5, 2012	Mount Lemmon	Mount Lemmon Survey	·	2.4 km	MPC · JPL
508011	2015 BB_{313}	—	September 11, 2010	Kitt Peak	Spacewatch	·	650 m	MPC · JPL
508012	2015 BS_{313}	—	September 18, 2006	Catalina	CSS	·	970 m	MPC · JPL
508013	2015 BC_{316}	—	January 13, 2008	Kitt Peak	Spacewatch	·	540 m	MPC · JPL
508014	2015 BB_{317}	—	April 6, 2000	Socorro	LINEAR	·	1.1 km	MPC · JPL
508015	2015 BC_{339}	—	June 16, 2012	Haleakala	Pan-STARRS 1	·	2.3 km	MPC · JPL
508016	2015 BH_{352}	—	December 15, 2004	Kitt Peak	Spacewatch	·	600 m	MPC · JPL
508017	2015 BY_{354}	—	November 28, 2013	Mount Lemmon	Mount Lemmon Survey	·	2.2 km	MPC · JPL
508018	2015 BF_{355}	—	May 7, 2007	Kitt Peak	Spacewatch	ADE	1.7 km	MPC · JPL
508019	2015 BP_{356}	—	July 15, 2013	Haleakala	Pan-STARRS 1	PHO	1 km	MPC · JPL
508020	2015 BL_{389}	—	September 20, 2009	Kitt Peak	Spacewatch	·	1.4 km	MPC · JPL
508021	2015 BA_{394}	—	December 3, 2010	Mount Lemmon	Mount Lemmon Survey	V	550 m	MPC · JPL
508022	2015 BG_{401}	—	September 20, 2003	Kitt Peak	Spacewatch	·	580 m	MPC · JPL
508023	2015 BD_{407}	—	October 28, 2005	Mount Lemmon	Mount Lemmon Survey	·	980 m	MPC · JPL
508024	2015 BX_{421}	—	September 4, 2008	Kitt Peak	Spacewatch	·	1.2 km	MPC · JPL
508025	2015 BJ_{427}	—	October 24, 2009	Mount Lemmon	Mount Lemmon Survey	·	1.6 km	MPC · JPL
508026	2015 BO_{429}	—	March 31, 2008	Mount Lemmon	Mount Lemmon Survey	·	910 m	MPC · JPL
508027	2015 BQ_{429}	—	February 12, 2004	Kitt Peak	Spacewatch	MAS	500 m	MPC · JPL
508028	2015 BD_{435}	—	July 1, 2008	Kitt Peak	Spacewatch	·	1.1 km	MPC · JPL
508029	2015 BQ_{435}	—	January 7, 2006	Mount Lemmon	Mount Lemmon Survey	·	1.8 km	MPC · JPL
508030	2015 BR_{437}	—	February 5, 2011	Mount Lemmon	Mount Lemmon Survey	·	900 m	MPC · JPL
508031	2015 BF_{438}	—	March 12, 2008	Kitt Peak	Spacewatch	·	930 m	MPC · JPL
508032	2015 BM_{455}	—	January 25, 2006	Kitt Peak	Spacewatch	·	1.5 km	MPC · JPL
508033	2015 BE_{458}	—	January 11, 2010	Kitt Peak	Spacewatch	BRA	1.5 km	MPC · JPL
508034	2015 BC_{461}	—	February 8, 2011	Mount Lemmon	Mount Lemmon Survey	·	1.2 km	MPC · JPL
508035	2015 BQ_{471}	—	April 1, 2012	Mount Lemmon	Mount Lemmon Survey	·	930 m	MPC · JPL
508036	2015 BV_{481}	—	May 29, 2008	Kitt Peak	Spacewatch	·	1.2 km	MPC · JPL
508037	2015 BO_{484}	—	November 15, 2007	Mount Lemmon	Mount Lemmon Survey	·	540 m	MPC · JPL
508038	2015 BG_{497}	—	January 27, 2006	Mount Lemmon	Mount Lemmon Survey	·	2.0 km	MPC · JPL
508039	2015 BN_{500}	—	December 30, 2007	Kitt Peak	Spacewatch	·	390 m	MPC · JPL
508040	2015 BG_{532}	—	September 3, 2008	La Sagra	OAM	·	1.8 km	MPC · JPL
508041	2015 BL_{532}	—	January 23, 2015	Haleakala	Pan-STARRS 1	·	1.7 km	MPC · JPL
508042	2015 BK_{533}	—	February 10, 2014	Mount Lemmon	Mount Lemmon Survey	EOS	1.7 km	MPC · JPL
508043	2015 BW_{533}	—	February 9, 2008	Kitt Peak	Spacewatch	CYB	4.0 km	MPC · JPL
508044	2015 BY_{533}	—	October 21, 2008	Mount Lemmon	Mount Lemmon Survey	·	2.0 km	MPC · JPL
508045	2015 BT_{534}	—	November 5, 2010	Mount Lemmon	Mount Lemmon Survey	·	1.2 km	MPC · JPL
508046	2015 BG_{535}	—	August 14, 2013	Haleakala	Pan-STARRS 1	EUN	930 m	MPC · JPL
508047	2015 BT_{535}	—	January 20, 2015	Haleakala	Pan-STARRS 1	·	1.2 km	MPC · JPL
508048	2015 BA_{536}	—	November 9, 2013	Mount Lemmon	Mount Lemmon Survey	RAF	870 m	MPC · JPL
508049	2015 BD_{536}	—	July 30, 2008	Catalina	CSS	·	1.8 km	MPC · JPL
508050	2015 BG_{536}	—	November 28, 2013	Mount Lemmon	Mount Lemmon Survey	·	1.3 km	MPC · JPL
508051	2015 BK_{536}	—	September 14, 2013	Haleakala	Pan-STARRS 1	·	1.5 km	MPC · JPL
508052	2015 BL_{536}	—	November 25, 2005	Mount Lemmon	Mount Lemmon Survey	·	1.5 km	MPC · JPL
508053	2015 BT_{536}	—	March 27, 2011	Mount Lemmon	Mount Lemmon Survey	·	1.3 km	MPC · JPL
508054	2015 BW_{536}	—	January 27, 2006	Kitt Peak	Spacewatch	·	1.5 km	MPC · JPL
508055	2015 BC_{537}	—	February 7, 2006	Kitt Peak	Spacewatch	·	1.7 km	MPC · JPL
508056	2015 BF_{537}	—	April 2, 2006	Kitt Peak	Spacewatch	MRX	880 m	MPC · JPL
508057	2015 BH_{537}	—	March 20, 2010	Mount Lemmon	Mount Lemmon Survey	·	2.8 km	MPC · JPL
508058	2015 BK_{537}	—	November 11, 1996	Kitt Peak	Spacewatch	·	690 m	MPC · JPL
508059	2015 BO_{537}	—	April 2, 2011	Haleakala	Pan-STARRS 1	·	1.9 km	MPC · JPL
508060	2015 BP_{537}	—	January 28, 2015	Haleakala	Pan-STARRS 1	·	1.7 km	MPC · JPL
508061	2015 CL_{1}	—	February 16, 2001	Kitt Peak	Spacewatch	·	560 m	MPC · JPL
508062	2015 CS_{1}	—	January 20, 2015	Haleakala	Pan-STARRS 1	·	2.6 km	MPC · JPL
508063	2015 CC_{5}	—	September 25, 2006	Kitt Peak	Spacewatch	·	1.1 km	MPC · JPL
508064	2015 CA_{9}	—	August 15, 2009	Kitt Peak	Spacewatch	·	1.0 km	MPC · JPL
508065	2015 CZ_{11}	—	April 21, 2004	Kitt Peak	Spacewatch	NYS	1.1 km	MPC · JPL
508066	2015 CJ_{31}	—	March 4, 2008	Mount Lemmon	Mount Lemmon Survey	·	780 m	MPC · JPL
508067	2015 CK_{31}	—	April 15, 2008	Mount Lemmon	Mount Lemmon Survey	V	590 m	MPC · JPL
508068	2015 CT_{31}	—	November 26, 2010	Mount Lemmon	Mount Lemmon Survey	·	660 m	MPC · JPL
508069	2015 CX_{39}	—	March 11, 2005	Kitt Peak	Spacewatch	·	860 m	MPC · JPL
508070	2015 CZ_{43}	—	April 20, 2007	Kitt Peak	Spacewatch	·	1.3 km	MPC · JPL
508071	2015 CB_{44}	—	September 12, 2005	Kitt Peak	Spacewatch	·	1.2 km	MPC · JPL
508072	2015 CV_{54}	—	March 11, 2011	Kitt Peak	Spacewatch	·	1.1 km	MPC · JPL
508073	2015 DO_{19}	—	June 13, 2012	Haleakala	Pan-STARRS 1	·	810 m	MPC · JPL
508074	2015 DA_{40}	—	May 20, 2012	Mount Lemmon	Mount Lemmon Survey	V	670 m	MPC · JPL
508075	2015 DV_{41}	—	May 14, 2008	Mount Lemmon	Mount Lemmon Survey	·	1.3 km	MPC · JPL
508076	2015 DM_{46}	—	September 18, 2003	Kitt Peak	Spacewatch	·	880 m	MPC · JPL
508077	2015 DB_{48}	—	February 16, 2015	Haleakala	Pan-STARRS 1	·	1.4 km	MPC · JPL
508078	2015 DF_{52}	—	October 3, 2013	Mount Lemmon	Mount Lemmon Survey	WIT	970 m	MPC · JPL
508079	2015 DS_{52}	—	September 13, 2007	Mount Lemmon	Mount Lemmon Survey	·	2.1 km	MPC · JPL
508080	2015 DT_{52}	—	August 10, 2012	Kitt Peak	Spacewatch	EUN	1.3 km	MPC · JPL
508081	2015 DA_{56}	—	January 28, 2007	Mount Lemmon	Mount Lemmon Survey	·	910 m	MPC · JPL
508082	2015 DB_{64}	—	February 10, 2011	Mount Lemmon	Mount Lemmon Survey	·	1.1 km	MPC · JPL
508083	2015 DC_{64}	—	January 10, 2008	Mount Lemmon	Mount Lemmon Survey	·	470 m	MPC · JPL
508084	2015 DT_{86}	—	September 24, 2013	Mount Lemmon	Mount Lemmon Survey	·	1.2 km	MPC · JPL
508085	2015 DU_{91}	—	February 12, 2004	Kitt Peak	Spacewatch	MAS	520 m	MPC · JPL
508086	2015 DY_{96}	—	April 27, 2011	Haleakala	Pan-STARRS 1	·	1.8 km	MPC · JPL
508087	2015 DT_{99}	—	November 21, 2009	Mount Lemmon	Mount Lemmon Survey	·	2.0 km	MPC · JPL
508088	2015 DF_{102}	—	November 10, 2010	Mount Lemmon	Mount Lemmon Survey	V	450 m	MPC · JPL
508089	2015 DF_{114}	—	March 29, 2008	Kitt Peak	Spacewatch	·	1.1 km	MPC · JPL
508090	2015 DP_{116}	—	August 21, 2004	Siding Spring	SSS	·	1.6 km	MPC · JPL
508091	2015 DY_{116}	—	November 1, 2013	Catalina	CSS	MAR	1.2 km	MPC · JPL
508092	2015 DX_{117}	—	September 25, 2008	Mount Lemmon	Mount Lemmon Survey	·	2.0 km	MPC · JPL
508093	2015 DA_{118}	—	October 9, 2012	Haleakala	Pan-STARRS 1	·	2.0 km	MPC · JPL
508094	2015 DL_{124}	—	September 5, 2008	Kitt Peak	Spacewatch	·	1.6 km	MPC · JPL
508095	2015 DX_{127}	—	November 11, 2009	Kitt Peak	Spacewatch	EUN	1.1 km	MPC · JPL
508096	2015 DU_{131}	—	March 17, 2007	Kitt Peak	Spacewatch	(194)	1.2 km	MPC · JPL
508097	2015 DN_{133}	—	May 19, 2010	Mount Lemmon	Mount Lemmon Survey	·	3.9 km	MPC · JPL
508098	2015 DL_{142}	—	September 17, 2010	Mount Lemmon	Mount Lemmon Survey	·	890 m	MPC · JPL
508099	2015 DD_{146}	—	October 17, 2010	Mount Lemmon	Mount Lemmon Survey	·	550 m	MPC · JPL
508100	2015 DY_{151}	—	March 27, 2011	Mount Lemmon	Mount Lemmon Survey	·	890 m	MPC · JPL

== 508101–508200 ==
back to top

Designation			Discovery			Properties		Ref
Permanent	Provisional	Named after	Date	Site	Discoverer(s)	Category	Diam.	Ref
508101	2015 DN_{153}	—	December 18, 2003	Socorro	LINEAR	·	820 m	MPC · JPL
508102	2015 DO_{156}	—	February 10, 2008	Mount Lemmon	Mount Lemmon Survey	·	460 m	MPC · JPL
508103	2015 DC_{157}	—	October 13, 2007	Kitt Peak	Spacewatch	·	640 m	MPC · JPL
508104	2015 DM_{164}	—	February 26, 2007	Mount Lemmon	Mount Lemmon Survey	·	810 m	MPC · JPL
508105	2015 DS_{166}	—	March 9, 2005	Mount Lemmon	Mount Lemmon Survey	·	620 m	MPC · JPL
508106	2015 DR_{167}	—	February 18, 2015	Haleakala	Pan-STARRS 1	·	1.5 km	MPC · JPL
508107	2015 DD_{175}	—	October 10, 2012	Mount Lemmon	Mount Lemmon Survey	·	2.0 km	MPC · JPL
508108	2015 DP_{175}	—	March 18, 2004	Kitt Peak	Spacewatch	·	1.4 km	MPC · JPL
508109	2015 DD_{179}	—	July 13, 2013	Haleakala	Pan-STARRS 1	·	1.6 km	MPC · JPL
508110	2015 DL_{179}	—	December 18, 2009	Kitt Peak	Spacewatch	·	2.3 km	MPC · JPL
508111	2015 DJ_{197}	—	June 15, 2005	Mount Lemmon	Mount Lemmon Survey	·	3.9 km	MPC · JPL
508112	2015 DU_{205}	—	September 24, 2008	Socorro	LINEAR	·	1.6 km	MPC · JPL
508113	2015 DM_{208}	—	February 23, 2015	Haleakala	Pan-STARRS 1	·	1.6 km	MPC · JPL
508114	2015 DJ_{210}	—	November 13, 2007	Mount Lemmon	Mount Lemmon Survey	·	2.1 km	MPC · JPL
508115	2015 DC_{211}	—	September 4, 2007	Mount Lemmon	Mount Lemmon Survey	·	1.9 km	MPC · JPL
508116	2015 DM_{212}	—	September 25, 2011	Haleakala	Pan-STARRS 1	·	3.2 km	MPC · JPL
508117	2015 DS_{218}	—	February 12, 2008	Mount Lemmon	Mount Lemmon Survey	V	680 m	MPC · JPL
508118	2015 DC_{222}	—	October 8, 2012	Haleakala	Pan-STARRS 1	·	1.9 km	MPC · JPL
508119	2015 DX_{228}	—	May 29, 2010	WISE	WISE	·	3.4 km	MPC · JPL
508120	2015 DA_{229}	—	March 28, 2011	Mount Lemmon	Mount Lemmon Survey	·	2.2 km	MPC · JPL
508121	2015 DL_{229}	—	November 1, 2005	Mount Lemmon	Mount Lemmon Survey	·	980 m	MPC · JPL
508122	2015 DN_{229}	—	November 14, 2009	La Sagra	OAM	HNS	1.2 km	MPC · JPL
508123	2015 DR_{229}	—	September 14, 2007	Siding Spring	SSS	BRA	1.7 km	MPC · JPL
508124	2015 DS_{229}	—	April 6, 2011	Mount Lemmon	Mount Lemmon Survey	·	1.1 km	MPC · JPL
508125	2015 DY_{229}	—	February 20, 2006	Kitt Peak	Spacewatch	·	2.4 km	MPC · JPL
508126	2015 EC_{22}	—	January 16, 2011	Mount Lemmon	Mount Lemmon Survey	NYS	1.0 km	MPC · JPL
508127	2015 EH_{28}	—	January 15, 2004	Kitt Peak	Spacewatch	·	800 m	MPC · JPL
508128	2015 EU_{36}	—	October 15, 2012	Haleakala	Pan-STARRS 1	EOS	1.8 km	MPC · JPL
508129	2015 ER_{40}	—	September 25, 2006	Mount Lemmon	Mount Lemmon Survey	·	760 m	MPC · JPL
508130	2015 EW_{63}	—	August 19, 2012	Siding Spring	SSS	PHO	1.2 km	MPC · JPL
508131	2015 EU_{68}	—	March 11, 2007	Kitt Peak	Spacewatch	·	1.3 km	MPC · JPL
508132	2015 FD_{7}	—	March 19, 2009	Kitt Peak	Spacewatch	·	720 m	MPC · JPL
508133	2015 FH_{20}	—	November 29, 2014	Haleakala	Pan-STARRS 1	EUN	1.2 km	MPC · JPL
508134	2015 FV_{21}	—	March 16, 2015	Haleakala	Pan-STARRS 1	·	2.2 km	MPC · JPL
508135	2015 FN_{32}	—	January 30, 2015	Haleakala	Pan-STARRS 1	EUN	1.2 km	MPC · JPL
508136	2015 FW_{37}	—	April 18, 2007	Kitt Peak	Spacewatch	·	940 m	MPC · JPL
508137	2015 FN_{43}	—	September 30, 2005	Mount Lemmon	Mount Lemmon Survey	PHO	930 m	MPC · JPL
508138	2015 FL_{45}	—	October 23, 2011	Mount Lemmon	Mount Lemmon Survey	·	3.3 km	MPC · JPL
508139	2015 FV_{64}	—	November 27, 2013	Haleakala	Pan-STARRS 1	·	2.7 km	MPC · JPL
508140	2015 FT_{74}	—	September 23, 2011	Haleakala	Pan-STARRS 1	·	2.4 km	MPC · JPL
508141	2015 FX_{74}	—	April 26, 2008	Mount Lemmon	Mount Lemmon Survey	·	1.0 km	MPC · JPL
508142	2015 FF_{75}	—	February 13, 2010	Mount Lemmon	Mount Lemmon Survey	·	1.6 km	MPC · JPL
508143	2015 FN_{75}	—	September 17, 2012	Kitt Peak	Spacewatch	·	1.9 km	MPC · JPL
508144	2015 FR_{75}	—	October 26, 2013	Kitt Peak	Spacewatch	·	1.2 km	MPC · JPL
508145	2015 FO_{76}	—	October 17, 2012	Haleakala	Pan-STARRS 1	·	1.6 km	MPC · JPL
508146	2015 FT_{76}	—	January 28, 2015	Haleakala	Pan-STARRS 1	·	2.2 km	MPC · JPL
508147	2015 FM_{94}	—	August 26, 2012	Haleakala	Pan-STARRS 1	·	2.9 km	MPC · JPL
508148	2015 FC_{111}	—	April 4, 2008	Catalina	CSS	·	980 m	MPC · JPL
508149	2015 FR_{140}	—	January 24, 2007	Mount Lemmon	Mount Lemmon Survey	·	880 m	MPC · JPL
508150	2015 FH_{151}	—	March 12, 2007	Mount Lemmon	Mount Lemmon Survey	MAS	780 m	MPC · JPL
508151	2015 FG_{153}	—	September 26, 2008	Kitt Peak	Spacewatch	·	1.5 km	MPC · JPL
508152	2015 FM_{157}	—	April 16, 2010	Mount Lemmon	Mount Lemmon Survey	GEF	1.1 km	MPC · JPL
508153	2015 FN_{158}	—	March 21, 2015	Haleakala	Pan-STARRS 1	·	1.3 km	MPC · JPL
508154	2015 FO_{158}	—	October 20, 2008	Kitt Peak	Spacewatch	·	1.6 km	MPC · JPL
508155	2015 FW_{158}	—	January 8, 2006	Kitt Peak	Spacewatch	·	1.3 km	MPC · JPL
508156	2015 FG_{161}	—	December 11, 2004	Kitt Peak	Spacewatch	WIT	870 m	MPC · JPL
508157	2015 FZ_{164}	—	January 23, 2015	Haleakala	Pan-STARRS 1	·	1.4 km	MPC · JPL
508158	2015 FS_{166}	—	January 31, 2006	Kitt Peak	Spacewatch	·	1.2 km	MPC · JPL
508159	2015 FE_{167}	—	March 21, 2015	Haleakala	Pan-STARRS 1	·	2.2 km	MPC · JPL
508160	2015 FY_{167}	—	March 1, 2011	Mount Lemmon	Mount Lemmon Survey	·	1.0 km	MPC · JPL
508161	2015 FS_{168}	—	March 2, 2011	Mount Lemmon	Mount Lemmon Survey	HNS	1.0 km	MPC · JPL
508162	2015 FY_{171}	—	December 28, 2013	Kitt Peak	Spacewatch	·	1.7 km	MPC · JPL
508163	2015 FM_{183}	—	September 27, 2008	Mount Lemmon	Mount Lemmon Survey	·	1.9 km	MPC · JPL
508164	2015 FG_{198}	—	December 13, 2010	Kitt Peak	Spacewatch	·	1.0 km	MPC · JPL
508165	2015 FT_{203}	—	January 30, 2006	Kitt Peak	Spacewatch	WIT	1.4 km	MPC · JPL
508166	2015 FR_{205}	—	September 23, 2009	Kitt Peak	Spacewatch	·	1.1 km	MPC · JPL
508167	2015 FW_{211}	—	January 12, 2010	Catalina	CSS	·	2.2 km	MPC · JPL
508168	2015 FY_{211}	—	January 25, 2015	Haleakala	Pan-STARRS 1	·	2.8 km	MPC · JPL
508169	2015 FZ_{211}	—	October 20, 2012	Mount Lemmon	Mount Lemmon Survey	·	3.8 km	MPC · JPL
508170	2015 FF_{212}	—	March 22, 2015	Haleakala	Pan-STARRS 1	·	2.4 km	MPC · JPL
508171	2015 FJ_{217}	—	November 18, 2006	Kitt Peak	Spacewatch	NYS	810 m	MPC · JPL
508172	2015 FW_{222}	—	March 25, 2006	Kitt Peak	Spacewatch	MRX	1.2 km	MPC · JPL
508173	2015 FJ_{225}	—	March 26, 2007	Mount Lemmon	Mount Lemmon Survey	·	1.6 km	MPC · JPL
508174	2015 FV_{274}	—	March 29, 2011	Kitt Peak	Spacewatch	·	1.8 km	MPC · JPL
508175	2015 FB_{279}	—	March 11, 2007	Kitt Peak	Spacewatch	·	870 m	MPC · JPL
508176	2015 FN_{285}	—	November 7, 2007	Kitt Peak	Spacewatch	·	630 m	MPC · JPL
508177	2015 FA_{286}	—	November 9, 2008	Mount Lemmon	Mount Lemmon Survey	·	1.7 km	MPC · JPL
508178	2015 FL_{287}	—	April 24, 2011	Siding Spring	SSS	·	1.7 km	MPC · JPL
508179	2015 FX_{292}	—	December 13, 2006	Kitt Peak	Spacewatch	NYS	1 km	MPC · JPL
508180	2015 FA_{294}	—	January 28, 2015	Haleakala	Pan-STARRS 1	TIR	2.6 km	MPC · JPL
508181	2015 FF_{296}	—	March 28, 2015	Haleakala	Pan-STARRS 1	·	2.3 km	MPC · JPL
508182	2015 FZ_{298}	—	December 12, 2012	Mount Lemmon	Mount Lemmon Survey	·	2.1 km	MPC · JPL
508183	2015 FN_{302}	—	March 4, 2005	Kitt Peak	Spacewatch	·	2.1 km	MPC · JPL
508184	2015 FO_{310}	—	January 8, 2015	Haleakala	Pan-STARRS 1	·	1.7 km	MPC · JPL
508185	2015 FT_{317}	—	October 15, 2012	Haleakala	Pan-STARRS 1	NEM	1.7 km	MPC · JPL
508186	2015 FG_{318}	—	January 23, 2015	Haleakala	Pan-STARRS 1	·	2.0 km	MPC · JPL
508187	2015 FC_{319}	—	October 12, 2007	Mount Lemmon	Mount Lemmon Survey	·	1.8 km	MPC · JPL
508188	2015 FH_{321}	—	November 9, 2013	Haleakala	Pan-STARRS 1	EUN	1.1 km	MPC · JPL
508189	2015 FN_{321}	—	July 27, 2005	Siding Spring	SSS	·	4.3 km	MPC · JPL
508190	2015 FV_{329}	—	April 30, 2011	Kitt Peak	Spacewatch	·	1.5 km	MPC · JPL
508191	2015 FR_{330}	—	December 10, 2009	Mount Lemmon	Mount Lemmon Survey	·	980 m	MPC · JPL
508192	2015 FW_{330}	—	September 3, 2008	Kitt Peak	Spacewatch	·	1.3 km	MPC · JPL
508193	2015 FN_{344}	—	January 23, 2015	Haleakala	Pan-STARRS 1	EUN	1.2 km	MPC · JPL
508194	2015 FR_{348}	—	December 3, 2004	Kitt Peak	Spacewatch	·	2.1 km	MPC · JPL
508195	2015 FU_{352}	—	September 28, 2003	Kitt Peak	Spacewatch	·	1.9 km	MPC · JPL
508196	2015 FN_{355}	—	April 30, 2006	Kitt Peak	Spacewatch	·	1.9 km	MPC · JPL
508197	2015 FS_{365}	—	October 10, 2008	Mount Lemmon	Mount Lemmon Survey	·	2.3 km	MPC · JPL
508198	2015 FB_{377}	—	June 14, 2007	Kitt Peak	Spacewatch	·	3.4 km	MPC · JPL
508199	2015 FM_{381}	—	April 20, 2007	Kitt Peak	Spacewatch	·	1.6 km	MPC · JPL
508200	2015 FX_{394}	—	September 25, 2006	Mount Lemmon	Mount Lemmon Survey	THM	2.1 km	MPC · JPL

== 508201–508300 ==
back to top

Designation			Discovery			Properties		Ref
Permanent	Provisional	Named after	Date	Site	Discoverer(s)	Category	Diam.	Ref
508201	2015 FA_{396}	—	March 3, 2006	Kitt Peak	Spacewatch	·	1.4 km	MPC · JPL
508202	2015 FJ_{396}	—	February 28, 2014	Haleakala	Pan-STARRS 1	·	2.3 km	MPC · JPL
508203	2015 FP_{396}	—	October 15, 2012	Haleakala	Pan-STARRS 1	KOR	1.1 km	MPC · JPL
508204	2015 FR_{396}	—	November 1, 2000	Kitt Peak	Spacewatch	MAR	1.2 km	MPC · JPL
508205	2015 FS_{396}	—	March 25, 2006	Catalina	CSS	·	1.9 km	MPC · JPL
508206	2015 FU_{396}	—	January 26, 2006	Mount Lemmon	Mount Lemmon Survey	·	1.6 km	MPC · JPL
508207	2015 FV_{396}	—	December 7, 2008	Mount Lemmon	Mount Lemmon Survey	·	2.0 km	MPC · JPL
508208	2015 FX_{396}	—	December 18, 2004	Mount Lemmon	Mount Lemmon Survey	·	2.0 km	MPC · JPL
508209	2015 FF_{397}	—	March 3, 2006	Kitt Peak	Spacewatch	·	1.1 km	MPC · JPL
508210	2015 GV_{16}	—	April 12, 2010	WISE	WISE	·	3.5 km	MPC · JPL
508211	2015 GU_{20}	—	December 1, 2006	Mount Lemmon	Mount Lemmon Survey	MAS	710 m	MPC · JPL
508212	2015 GA_{21}	—	October 8, 2012	Mount Lemmon	Mount Lemmon Survey	EOS	1.6 km	MPC · JPL
508213	2015 GF_{22}	—	March 18, 2010	WISE	WISE	ADE	1.9 km	MPC · JPL
508214	2015 GS_{22}	—	December 3, 2008	Mount Lemmon	Mount Lemmon Survey	·	1.6 km	MPC · JPL
508215	2015 GY_{23}	—	January 1, 2008	Kitt Peak	Spacewatch	·	3.3 km	MPC · JPL
508216	2015 GN_{24}	—	February 16, 2015	Haleakala	Pan-STARRS 1	·	2.2 km	MPC · JPL
508217	2015 GO_{29}	—	March 30, 2000	Kitt Peak	Spacewatch	·	990 m	MPC · JPL
508218	2015 GN_{31}	—	January 8, 2007	Mount Lemmon	Mount Lemmon Survey	MAS	610 m	MPC · JPL
508219	2015 GY_{31}	—	March 13, 2011	Mount Lemmon	Mount Lemmon Survey	·	820 m	MPC · JPL
508220	2015 GW_{34}	—	May 3, 2010	Kitt Peak	Spacewatch	·	3.3 km	MPC · JPL
508221	2015 GJ_{37}	—	November 9, 2007	Mount Lemmon	Mount Lemmon Survey	·	620 m	MPC · JPL
508222	2015 GB_{40}	—	April 15, 2007	Kitt Peak	Spacewatch	MAR	780 m	MPC · JPL
508223	2015 GD_{42}	—	December 10, 2012	Haleakala	Pan-STARRS 1	VER	2.3 km	MPC · JPL
508224	2015 GR_{42}	—	April 23, 2011	Haleakala	Pan-STARRS 1	·	840 m	MPC · JPL
508225	2015 GR_{45}	—	December 30, 2013	Haleakala	Pan-STARRS 1	·	1.8 km	MPC · JPL
508226	2015 GL_{51}	—	December 4, 2013	Haleakala	Pan-STARRS 1	·	2.0 km	MPC · JPL
508227	2015 GN_{51}	—	September 15, 2007	Anderson Mesa	LONEOS	·	4.9 km	MPC · JPL
508228	2015 HP	—	January 1, 2008	Kitt Peak	Spacewatch	·	3.2 km	MPC · JPL
508229	2015 HM_{4}	—	February 14, 2010	WISE	WISE	·	3.7 km	MPC · JPL
508230	2015 HT_{4}	—	December 19, 2003	Socorro	LINEAR	·	1.1 km	MPC · JPL
508231	2015 HN_{6}	—	March 20, 2015	Haleakala	Pan-STARRS 1	GEF	1.1 km	MPC · JPL
508232	2015 HT_{12}	—	October 10, 2012	Mount Lemmon	Mount Lemmon Survey	·	3.0 km	MPC · JPL
508233	2015 HC_{13}	—	January 28, 2015	Haleakala	Pan-STARRS 1	·	2.0 km	MPC · JPL
508234	2015 HK_{20}	—	October 4, 2002	Campo Imperatore	CINEOS	3:2	6.4 km	MPC · JPL
508235	2015 HY_{25}	—	June 15, 2010	Mount Lemmon	Mount Lemmon Survey	·	3.9 km	MPC · JPL
508236	2015 HP_{27}	—	January 23, 2006	Kitt Peak	Spacewatch	·	1.2 km	MPC · JPL
508237	2015 HF_{28}	—	March 23, 2006	Kitt Peak	Spacewatch	·	1.7 km	MPC · JPL
508238	2015 HD_{33}	—	September 16, 2003	Kitt Peak	Spacewatch	WIT	1.0 km	MPC · JPL
508239	2015 HF_{33}	—	October 1, 2008	Mount Lemmon	Mount Lemmon Survey	·	1.5 km	MPC · JPL
508240	2015 HK_{34}	—	May 25, 2006	Kitt Peak	Spacewatch	HOF	2.6 km	MPC · JPL
508241	2015 HG_{36}	—	January 28, 2015	Haleakala	Pan-STARRS 1	GEF	1.1 km	MPC · JPL
508242	2015 HE_{37}	—	June 14, 2010	Mount Lemmon	Mount Lemmon Survey	·	2.6 km	MPC · JPL
508243	2015 HK_{37}	—	September 23, 2012	Kitt Peak	Spacewatch	·	1.9 km	MPC · JPL
508244	2015 HT_{38}	—	September 22, 2008	Kitt Peak	Spacewatch	HNS	1.1 km	MPC · JPL
508245	2015 HW_{39}	—	October 25, 2011	Haleakala	Pan-STARRS 1	·	3.8 km	MPC · JPL
508246	2015 HY_{45}	—	September 25, 2011	Haleakala	Pan-STARRS 1	·	2.6 km	MPC · JPL
508247	2015 HG_{56}	—	January 7, 2013	Haleakala	Pan-STARRS 1	·	3.0 km	MPC · JPL
508248	2015 HM_{60}	—	October 4, 1994	Kitt Peak	Spacewatch	URS	2.7 km	MPC · JPL
508249	2015 HO_{64}	—	October 24, 2011	Mount Lemmon	Mount Lemmon Survey	·	1.9 km	MPC · JPL
508250	2015 HN_{65}	—	January 20, 2009	Kitt Peak	Spacewatch	·	1.5 km	MPC · JPL
508251	2015 HA_{72}	—	November 17, 2008	Kitt Peak	Spacewatch	·	1.6 km	MPC · JPL
508252	2015 HT_{74}	—	March 17, 2015	Haleakala	Pan-STARRS 1	·	1.5 km	MPC · JPL
508253	2015 HV_{76}	—	August 27, 2006	Kitt Peak	Spacewatch	·	1.9 km	MPC · JPL
508254	2015 HF_{77}	—	April 26, 2006	Kitt Peak	Spacewatch	·	1.6 km	MPC · JPL
508255	2015 HB_{80}	—	March 18, 2009	Kitt Peak	Spacewatch	·	2.5 km	MPC · JPL
508256	2015 HR_{84}	—	January 31, 2006	Mount Lemmon	Mount Lemmon Survey	·	1.5 km	MPC · JPL
508257	2015 HZ_{84}	—	September 17, 2006	Kitt Peak	Spacewatch	·	2.2 km	MPC · JPL
508258	2015 HG_{87}	—	October 21, 2012	Haleakala	Pan-STARRS 1	·	2.6 km	MPC · JPL
508259	2015 HH_{90}	—	December 6, 2012	Mount Lemmon	Mount Lemmon Survey	·	2.5 km	MPC · JPL
508260	2015 HM_{100}	—	January 1, 2014	Haleakala	Pan-STARRS 1	·	1.9 km	MPC · JPL
508261	2015 HP_{114}	—	February 3, 2009	Mount Lemmon	Mount Lemmon Survey	EOS	2.1 km	MPC · JPL
508262	2015 HF_{133}	—	March 2, 2009	Mount Lemmon	Mount Lemmon Survey	·	1.7 km	MPC · JPL
508263	2015 HK_{134}	—	April 15, 2010	WISE	WISE	ADE	1.6 km	MPC · JPL
508264	2015 HP_{141}	—	October 23, 2012	Kitt Peak	Spacewatch	·	1.8 km	MPC · JPL
508265	2015 HQ_{157}	—	November 27, 2013	Haleakala	Pan-STARRS 1	·	1.8 km	MPC · JPL
508266	2015 HO_{164}	—	April 10, 2005	Kitt Peak	Spacewatch	KOR	1.4 km	MPC · JPL
508267	2015 HS_{166}	—	October 22, 2011	Mount Lemmon	Mount Lemmon Survey	·	2.7 km	MPC · JPL
508268	2015 HD_{169}	—	January 20, 2009	Kitt Peak	Spacewatch	·	1.6 km	MPC · JPL
508269	2015 HF_{169}	—	April 7, 2011	Kitt Peak	Spacewatch	·	1.3 km	MPC · JPL
508270	2015 HY_{171}	—	January 28, 2015	Haleakala	Pan-STARRS 1	·	2.0 km	MPC · JPL
508271	2015 HW_{172}	—	April 20, 2002	Kitt Peak	Spacewatch	·	1.5 km	MPC · JPL
508272	2015 HY_{172}	—	March 9, 2011	Mount Lemmon	Mount Lemmon Survey	NYS	1.2 km	MPC · JPL
508273	2015 HC_{174}	—	February 29, 2004	Kitt Peak	Spacewatch	·	1.7 km	MPC · JPL
508274	2015 HD_{174}	—	May 24, 2011	Haleakala	Pan-STARRS 1	·	1.2 km	MPC · JPL
508275	2015 HM_{179}	—	September 13, 2007	Kitt Peak	Spacewatch	DOR	2.5 km	MPC · JPL
508276	2015 HH_{181}	—	March 14, 2011	Mount Lemmon	Mount Lemmon Survey	·	1.4 km	MPC · JPL
508277	2015 HZ_{184}	—	September 30, 2006	Mount Lemmon	Mount Lemmon Survey	·	2.7 km	MPC · JPL
508278	2015 HM_{185}	—	January 11, 2008	Kitt Peak	Spacewatch	·	2.6 km	MPC · JPL
508279	2015 HP_{185}	—	April 23, 2015	Haleakala	Pan-STARRS 1	·	2.5 km	MPC · JPL
508280	2015 HQ_{185}	—	February 20, 2009	Kitt Peak	Spacewatch	·	2.6 km	MPC · JPL
508281	2015 HR_{185}	—	September 30, 1995	Kitt Peak	Spacewatch	EOS	1.6 km	MPC · JPL
508282	2015 HT_{185}	—	September 17, 2006	Catalina	CSS	·	2.9 km	MPC · JPL
508283	2015 HU_{185}	—	February 20, 2009	Kitt Peak	Spacewatch	·	2.1 km	MPC · JPL
508284	2015 JU_{12}	—	October 26, 1995	Kitt Peak	Spacewatch	JUN	1.3 km	MPC · JPL
508285	2015 JZ_{12}	—	April 20, 2009	Kitt Peak	Spacewatch	·	2.5 km	MPC · JPL
508286	2015 KF_{4}	—	August 8, 2012	Haleakala	Pan-STARRS 1	·	2.0 km	MPC · JPL
508287	2015 KY_{6}	—	January 21, 2010	La Sagra	OAM	·	2.4 km	MPC · JPL
508288	2015 KP_{12}	—	April 10, 2010	WISE	WISE	·	3.1 km	MPC · JPL
508289	2015 KC_{15}	—	January 12, 2008	Kitt Peak	Spacewatch	·	2.6 km	MPC · JPL
508290	2015 KU_{16}	—	September 24, 2011	Haleakala	Pan-STARRS 1	·	2.6 km	MPC · JPL
508291	2015 KY_{16}	—	July 4, 2005	Kitt Peak	Spacewatch	·	2.3 km	MPC · JPL
508292	2015 KA_{17}	—	May 18, 2015	Haleakala	Pan-STARRS 1	URS	3.4 km	MPC · JPL
508293	2015 KT_{23}	—	December 2, 2005	Mount Lemmon	Mount Lemmon Survey	·	940 m	MPC · JPL
508294	2015 KW_{24}	—	May 29, 2006	Kitt Peak	Spacewatch	·	1.5 km	MPC · JPL
508295	2015 KM_{31}	—	November 12, 2012	Mount Lemmon	Mount Lemmon Survey	(194)	1.7 km	MPC · JPL
508296	2015 KB_{34}	—	September 10, 2007	Kitt Peak	Spacewatch	·	1.6 km	MPC · JPL
508297	2015 KE_{34}	—	December 28, 2013	Kitt Peak	Spacewatch	HYG	2.1 km	MPC · JPL
508298	2015 KF_{35}	—	September 14, 2007	Kitt Peak	Spacewatch	HOF	2.7 km	MPC · JPL
508299	2015 KN_{37}	—	October 22, 2006	Kitt Peak	Spacewatch	·	2.7 km	MPC · JPL
508300	2015 KQ_{37}	—	April 2, 2010	WISE	WISE	·	5.7 km	MPC · JPL

== 508301–508400 ==
back to top

Designation			Discovery			Properties		Ref
Permanent	Provisional	Named after	Date	Site	Discoverer(s)	Category	Diam.	Ref
508301	2015 KA_{40}	—	March 2, 2009	Mount Lemmon	Mount Lemmon Survey	EOS	1.8 km	MPC · JPL
508302	2015 KJ_{46}	—	April 30, 2003	Kitt Peak	Spacewatch	·	2.9 km	MPC · JPL
508303	2015 KD_{53}	—	April 18, 2009	Mount Lemmon	Mount Lemmon Survey	·	2.2 km	MPC · JPL
508304	2015 KT_{53}	—	May 11, 2010	WISE	WISE	LIX	4.0 km	MPC · JPL
508305	2015 KF_{62}	—	March 28, 2015	Haleakala	Pan-STARRS 1	·	1.6 km	MPC · JPL
508306	2015 KK_{83}	—	October 15, 2006	Kitt Peak	Spacewatch	·	3.1 km	MPC · JPL
508307	2015 KD_{87}	—	December 6, 2012	Mount Lemmon	Mount Lemmon Survey	·	2.5 km	MPC · JPL
508308	2015 KC_{94}	—	September 24, 2011	Haleakala	Pan-STARRS 1	·	2.9 km	MPC · JPL
508309	2015 KO_{94}	—	March 19, 2009	Mount Lemmon	Mount Lemmon Survey	·	1.5 km	MPC · JPL
508310	2015 KK_{96}	—	April 13, 2010	WISE	WISE	LUT	3.8 km	MPC · JPL
508311	2015 KD_{118}	—	February 15, 2010	Kitt Peak	Spacewatch	·	1.7 km	MPC · JPL
508312	2015 KA_{123}	—	May 13, 2015	Mount Lemmon	Mount Lemmon Survey	·	2.4 km	MPC · JPL
508313	2015 KZ_{133}	—	April 14, 2004	Anderson Mesa	LONEOS	V	910 m	MPC · JPL
508314	2015 KG_{137}	—	March 16, 2010	Mount Lemmon	Mount Lemmon Survey	·	1.5 km	MPC · JPL
508315	2015 KK_{138}	—	October 29, 2008	Kitt Peak	Spacewatch	·	2.0 km	MPC · JPL
508316	2015 KN_{139}	—	October 16, 2006	Kitt Peak	Spacewatch	·	2.8 km	MPC · JPL
508317	2015 KM_{140}	—	January 10, 2014	Kitt Peak	Spacewatch	·	1.5 km	MPC · JPL
508318	2015 KW_{150}	—	January 25, 2006	Kitt Peak	Spacewatch	·	1.2 km	MPC · JPL
508319	2015 KE_{165}	—	March 13, 2010	Kitt Peak	Spacewatch	·	1.8 km	MPC · JPL
508320	2015 LL_{1}	—	January 26, 2006	Mount Lemmon	Mount Lemmon Survey	·	1.7 km	MPC · JPL
508321	2015 LT_{7}	—	September 24, 2011	Haleakala	Pan-STARRS 1	·	3.0 km	MPC · JPL
508322	2015 LT_{22}	—	September 24, 2011	Haleakala	Pan-STARRS 1	·	2.6 km	MPC · JPL
508323	2015 LR_{24}	—	April 14, 2010	WISE	WISE	·	3.4 km	MPC · JPL
508324	2015 LF_{34}	—	September 26, 2011	Haleakala	Pan-STARRS 1	KOR	1.5 km	MPC · JPL
508325	2015 LW_{41}	—	April 20, 2009	Mount Lemmon	Mount Lemmon Survey	·	2.3 km	MPC · JPL
508326	2015 LY_{41}	—	May 27, 2009	Mount Lemmon	Mount Lemmon Survey	·	4.2 km	MPC · JPL
508327	2015 MG_{7}	—	December 21, 2008	Mount Lemmon	Mount Lemmon Survey	MAR	1.0 km	MPC · JPL
508328	2015 MX_{7}	—	March 4, 2014	Haleakala	Pan-STARRS 1	·	2.0 km	MPC · JPL
508329	2015 MP_{13}	—	May 21, 2014	Haleakala	Pan-STARRS 1	·	3.1 km	MPC · JPL
508330	2015 MY_{23}	—	November 1, 2007	Kitt Peak	Spacewatch	·	2.7 km	MPC · JPL
508331	2015 MV_{33}	—	May 21, 2015	Haleakala	Pan-STARRS 1	(43176)	2.3 km	MPC · JPL
508332	2015 MA_{44}	—	April 2, 2006	Anderson Mesa	LONEOS	HNS	1.4 km	MPC · JPL
508333	2015 ML_{52}	—	March 28, 2009	Mount Lemmon	Mount Lemmon Survey	·	2.7 km	MPC · JPL
508334	2015 MK_{104}	—	June 12, 2009	Kitt Peak	Spacewatch	·	2.9 km	MPC · JPL
508335	2015 NC_{13}	—	April 27, 2010	WISE	WISE	·	3.4 km	MPC · JPL
508336	2015 PK_{41}	—	September 18, 2010	Kitt Peak	Spacewatch	·	2.8 km	MPC · JPL
508337	2015 PH_{80}	—	February 18, 2013	Kitt Peak	Spacewatch	3:2 · SHU	4.3 km	MPC · JPL
508338	2015 SO_{20}	—	October 8, 2010	La Silla	M. E. Schwamb	SDO	177 km	MPC · JPL
508339	2015 UQ_{65}	—	September 18, 2004	Siding Spring	SSS	·	2.2 km	MPC · JPL
508340	2015 VA_{41}	—	September 27, 2011	Mount Lemmon	Mount Lemmon Survey	·	1.1 km	MPC · JPL
508341	2015 XB_{1}	—	June 3, 1995	Kitt Peak	Spacewatch	·	530 m	MPC · JPL
508342	2016 AQ_{23}	—	November 17, 2006	Kitt Peak	Spacewatch	MIS	1.8 km	MPC · JPL
508343	2016 AC_{195}	—	May 31, 2011	Mount Lemmon	Mount Lemmon Survey	H	460 m	MPC · JPL
508344	2016 BN_{39}	—	December 7, 2005	Catalina	CSS	H	450 m	MPC · JPL
508345	2016 BG_{82}	—	May 21, 2006	Kitt Peak	Spacewatch	H	480 m	MPC · JPL
508346	2016 BL_{82}	—	November 25, 2012	Haleakala	Pan-STARRS 1	H	520 m	MPC · JPL
508347	2016 CY_{29}	—	January 15, 2008	Mount Lemmon	Mount Lemmon Survey	H	460 m	MPC · JPL
508348	2016 CB_{123}	—	December 22, 2008	Mount Lemmon	Mount Lemmon Survey	·	1.1 km	MPC · JPL
508349	2016 CX_{265}	—	October 7, 2012	Haleakala	Pan-STARRS 1	H	360 m	MPC · JPL
508350	2016 CG_{267}	—	March 26, 2011	Mount Lemmon	Mount Lemmon Survey	H	390 m	MPC · JPL
508351	2016 CD_{279}	—	December 19, 2007	Mount Lemmon	Mount Lemmon Survey	·	1.1 km	MPC · JPL
508352	2016 EV_{19}	—	January 14, 2011	Kitt Peak	Spacewatch	·	1.7 km	MPC · JPL
508353	2016 ET_{37}	—	December 6, 2010	Mount Lemmon	Mount Lemmon Survey	PHO	1.1 km	MPC · JPL
508354	2016 EE_{55}	—	December 9, 2015	Haleakala	Pan-STARRS 1	H	510 m	MPC · JPL
508355	2016 EF_{66}	—	November 13, 2010	Mount Lemmon	Mount Lemmon Survey	·	1.7 km	MPC · JPL
508356	2016 EF_{84}	—	April 3, 2008	Mount Lemmon	Mount Lemmon Survey	H	460 m	MPC · JPL
508357	2016 EV_{85}	—	December 18, 2007	Catalina	CSS	H	620 m	MPC · JPL
508358	2016 EW_{110}	—	August 20, 2014	Haleakala	Pan-STARRS 1	H	550 m	MPC · JPL
508359	2016 EH_{127}	—	August 18, 2006	Kitt Peak	Spacewatch	·	1.1 km	MPC · JPL
508360	2016 EV_{133}	—	February 8, 2011	Mount Lemmon	Mount Lemmon Survey	GEF	1.1 km	MPC · JPL
508361	2016 EQ_{149}	—	August 2, 2008	Siding Spring	SSS	·	2.0 km	MPC · JPL
508362	2016 EP_{150}	—	March 4, 2005	Mount Lemmon	Mount Lemmon Survey	·	980 m	MPC · JPL
508363	2016 EU_{170}	—	January 18, 2016	Haleakala	Pan-STARRS 1	·	2.3 km	MPC · JPL
508364	2016 EV_{192}	—	May 5, 2013	Haleakala	Pan-STARRS 1	·	610 m	MPC · JPL
508365	2016 EL_{193}	—	February 26, 2009	Kitt Peak	Spacewatch	·	600 m	MPC · JPL
508366	2016 EL_{200}	—	March 15, 2016	Haleakala	Pan-STARRS 1	·	1.8 km	MPC · JPL
508367	2016 EO_{200}	—	November 6, 2013	Haleakala	Pan-STARRS 1	·	1.5 km	MPC · JPL
508368	2016 EV_{204}	—	October 17, 2006	Kitt Peak	Spacewatch	H	420 m	MPC · JPL
508369	2016 ET_{214}	—	October 18, 2012	Haleakala	Pan-STARRS 1	·	2.2 km	MPC · JPL
508370	2016 ES_{215}	—	March 16, 2005	Catalina	CSS	V	760 m	MPC · JPL
508371	2016 EY_{215}	—	September 12, 2007	Catalina	CSS	TEL	1.8 km	MPC · JPL
508372	2016 EZ_{215}	—	October 31, 2010	Mount Lemmon	Mount Lemmon Survey	·	980 m	MPC · JPL
508373	2016 EB_{216}	—	October 22, 2008	Mount Lemmon	Mount Lemmon Survey	·	2.4 km	MPC · JPL
508374	2016 EG_{217}	—	November 17, 2009	Kitt Peak	Spacewatch	·	1.2 km	MPC · JPL
508375	2016 ER_{217}	—	May 5, 2008	Mount Lemmon	Mount Lemmon Survey	·	1.1 km	MPC · JPL
508376	2016 FK	—	October 10, 2009	Majdanak	T. V. Krjačko	H	580 m	MPC · JPL
508377	2016 FQ_{2}	—	January 8, 2016	Haleakala	Pan-STARRS 1	·	1.7 km	MPC · JPL
508378	2016 FK_{7}	—	October 11, 2007	Mount Lemmon	Mount Lemmon Survey	·	820 m	MPC · JPL
508379	2016 FV_{37}	—	December 28, 2014	Mount Lemmon	Mount Lemmon Survey	·	730 m	MPC · JPL
508380	2016 FR_{46}	—	November 5, 2007	Mount Lemmon	Mount Lemmon Survey	·	600 m	MPC · JPL
508381	2016 FO_{53}	—	March 6, 2008	Mount Lemmon	Mount Lemmon Survey	·	1 km	MPC · JPL
508382	2016 FT_{61}	—	November 17, 2009	Kitt Peak	Spacewatch	H	500 m	MPC · JPL
508383	2016 FH_{62}	—	June 27, 2010	WISE	WISE	·	2.7 km	MPC · JPL
508384	2016 FR_{62}	—	April 11, 2005	Mount Lemmon	Mount Lemmon Survey	·	1.3 km	MPC · JPL
508385	2016 FA_{63}	—	January 23, 2015	Haleakala	Pan-STARRS 1	EOS	1.7 km	MPC · JPL
508386	2016 FE_{63}	—	March 31, 2016	Haleakala	Pan-STARRS 1	RAF	840 m	MPC · JPL
508387	2016 FK_{63}	—	March 25, 2007	Mount Lemmon	Mount Lemmon Survey	·	1.7 km	MPC · JPL
508388	2016 GK_{1}	—	October 30, 2007	Catalina	CSS	·	1.1 km	MPC · JPL
508389	2016 GM_{3}	—	February 9, 2016	Haleakala	Pan-STARRS 1	·	720 m	MPC · JPL
508390	2016 GD_{29}	—	August 12, 2010	Kitt Peak	Spacewatch	·	680 m	MPC · JPL
508391	2016 GC_{86}	—	April 27, 2009	Kitt Peak	Spacewatch	·	960 m	MPC · JPL
508392	2016 GQ_{98}	—	March 18, 2009	Kitt Peak	Spacewatch	·	780 m	MPC · JPL
508393	2016 GA_{126}	—	March 7, 2008	Catalina	CSS	PHO	1.3 km	MPC · JPL
508394	2016 GO_{133}	—	June 7, 2008	Siding Spring	SSS	·	1.5 km	MPC · JPL
508395	2016 GJ_{170}	—	April 11, 2003	Kitt Peak	Spacewatch	·	840 m	MPC · JPL
508396	2016 GO_{174}	—	October 9, 2007	Kitt Peak	Spacewatch	·	600 m	MPC · JPL
508397	2016 GL_{187}	—	August 19, 2010	XuYi	PMO NEO Survey Program	·	640 m	MPC · JPL
508398	2016 GX_{189}	—	November 9, 2009	Kitt Peak	Spacewatch	·	2.0 km	MPC · JPL
508399	2016 GO_{190}	—	February 13, 2016	Haleakala	Pan-STARRS 1	PHO	980 m	MPC · JPL
508400	2016 GA_{211}	—	September 17, 2006	Kitt Peak	Spacewatch	·	900 m	MPC · JPL

== 508401–508500 ==
back to top

Designation			Discovery			Properties		Ref
Permanent	Provisional	Named after	Date	Site	Discoverer(s)	Category	Diam.	Ref
508401	2016 GY_{225}	—	January 18, 2015	Mount Lemmon	Mount Lemmon Survey	·	1.7 km	MPC · JPL
508402	2016 GX_{237}	—	October 25, 2013	Mount Lemmon	Mount Lemmon Survey	KON	1.9 km	MPC · JPL
508403	2016 GN_{241}	—	September 14, 2007	Mount Lemmon	Mount Lemmon Survey	·	730 m	MPC · JPL
508404	2016 GF_{248}	—	September 1, 2013	Mount Lemmon	Mount Lemmon Survey	NYS	940 m	MPC · JPL
508405	2016 GB_{253}	—	March 17, 2013	Catalina	CSS	H	540 m	MPC · JPL
508406	2016 GM_{256}	—	August 10, 2012	Kitt Peak	Spacewatch	·	1.8 km	MPC · JPL
508407	2016 GL_{257}	—	October 29, 2005	Mount Lemmon	Mount Lemmon Survey	·	1.6 km	MPC · JPL
508408	2016 GM_{257}	—	December 14, 2001	Socorro	LINEAR	MAR	1.1 km	MPC · JPL
508409	2016 HQ_{10}	—	March 17, 2012	Mount Lemmon	Mount Lemmon Survey	·	1.1 km	MPC · JPL
508410	2016 HJ_{24}	—	December 11, 2012	Mount Lemmon	Mount Lemmon Survey	·	2.6 km	MPC · JPL
508411	2016 JL	—	April 30, 2006	Kitt Peak	Spacewatch	H	410 m	MPC · JPL
508412	2016 JR_{4}	—	December 29, 2003	Kitt Peak	Spacewatch	·	1.5 km	MPC · JPL
508413	2016 JD_{8}	—	June 17, 2009	Kitt Peak	Spacewatch	·	1.1 km	MPC · JPL
508414	2016 JW_{9}	—	February 16, 2012	Haleakala	Pan-STARRS 1	·	800 m	MPC · JPL
508415	2016 JU_{11}	—	August 16, 2012	Siding Spring	SSS	·	1.9 km	MPC · JPL
508416	2016 JG_{14}	—	January 30, 2011	Mount Lemmon	Mount Lemmon Survey	·	1.4 km	MPC · JPL
508417	2016 JB_{15}	—	March 17, 2016	Haleakala	Pan-STARRS 1	·	2.1 km	MPC · JPL
508418	2016 JT_{23}	—	March 16, 2007	Mount Lemmon	Mount Lemmon Survey	·	2.2 km	MPC · JPL
508419	2016 JA_{26}	—	March 16, 2012	Mount Lemmon	Mount Lemmon Survey	·	1.3 km	MPC · JPL
508420	2016 JL_{27}	—	June 20, 2013	Haleakala	Pan-STARRS 1	V	570 m	MPC · JPL
508421	2016 JY_{29}	—	October 22, 2003	Kitt Peak	Spacewatch	·	1.2 km	MPC · JPL
508422	2016 JM_{30}	—	September 14, 2013	Mount Lemmon	Mount Lemmon Survey	ADE	1.8 km	MPC · JPL
508423	2016 JJ_{31}	—	April 18, 2007	Catalina	CSS	JUN	1.1 km	MPC · JPL
508424	2016 JF_{32}	—	March 10, 2011	Mount Lemmon	Mount Lemmon Survey	·	1.9 km	MPC · JPL
508425	2016 JJ_{32}	—	May 11, 2003	Kitt Peak	Spacewatch	·	2.3 km	MPC · JPL
508426	2016 JR_{32}	—	February 8, 2011	Mount Lemmon	Mount Lemmon Survey	·	1.5 km	MPC · JPL
508427	2016 JU_{35}	—	August 2, 2008	Siding Spring	SSS	·	1.7 km	MPC · JPL
508428	2016 JU_{36}	—	February 22, 2009	Kitt Peak	Spacewatch	·	610 m	MPC · JPL
508429	2016 JE_{39}	—	October 2, 2014	Catalina	CSS	H	450 m	MPC · JPL
508430	2016 JJ_{40}	—	August 24, 2011	Haleakala	Pan-STARRS 1	·	2.2 km	MPC · JPL
508431	2016 JL_{40}	—	May 2, 2016	Haleakala	Pan-STARRS 1	·	2.1 km	MPC · JPL
508432	2016 KV_{1}	—	September 8, 2008	Siding Spring	SSS	·	2.0 km	MPC · JPL
508433	2016 KU_{2}	—	January 20, 2015	Mount Lemmon	Mount Lemmon Survey	·	1.5 km	MPC · JPL
508434	2016 KZ_{2}	—	July 11, 2004	Socorro	LINEAR	·	1.6 km	MPC · JPL
508435	2016 KG_{4}	—	May 24, 2011	Mount Lemmon	Mount Lemmon Survey	H	440 m	MPC · JPL
508436	2016 KA_{5}	—	January 23, 2006	Mount Lemmon	Mount Lemmon Survey	·	1.8 km	MPC · JPL
508437	2016 LZ	—	September 21, 2008	Catalina	CSS	·	2.0 km	MPC · JPL
508438	2016 LY_{2}	—	January 23, 2015	Haleakala	Pan-STARRS 1	·	1.4 km	MPC · JPL
508439	2016 LF_{6}	—	April 10, 2016	Haleakala	Pan-STARRS 1	·	2.6 km	MPC · JPL
508440 Lewishamilton	2016 LH_{7}	Lewishamilton	November 10, 2013	Mount Lemmon	Mount Lemmon Survey	·	1.0 km	MPC · JPL
508441	2016 LF_{21}	—	May 8, 2005	Mount Lemmon	Mount Lemmon Survey	V	500 m	MPC · JPL
508442	2016 LM_{27}	—	January 20, 2015	Haleakala	Pan-STARRS 1	·	1.8 km	MPC · JPL
508443	2016 LE_{29}	—	April 4, 2016	Haleakala	Pan-STARRS 1	·	1.6 km	MPC · JPL
508444	2016 LK_{29}	—	August 16, 2009	Kitt Peak	Spacewatch	T_{j} (2.95)	2.3 km	MPC · JPL
508445	2016 LT_{33}	—	May 15, 2012	Mount Lemmon	Mount Lemmon Survey	·	1.0 km	MPC · JPL
508446	2016 LW_{34}	—	February 8, 2008	Kitt Peak	Spacewatch	·	1.1 km	MPC · JPL
508447	2016 LZ_{51}	—	March 1, 2011	Catalina	CSS	·	1.4 km	MPC · JPL
508448	2016 LS_{53}	—	April 25, 2004	Kitt Peak	Spacewatch	THB	2.4 km	MPC · JPL
508449	2016 LX_{53}	—	June 5, 2011	Kitt Peak	Spacewatch	·	1.5 km	MPC · JPL
508450	2016 LC_{54}	—	July 24, 2011	Haleakala	Pan-STARRS 1	·	2.4 km	MPC · JPL
508451	2016 LG_{56}	—	November 29, 2013	Haleakala	Pan-STARRS 1	·	1.5 km	MPC · JPL
508452	2016 MX_{1}	—	January 30, 2011	Mount Lemmon	Mount Lemmon Survey	·	1.3 km	MPC · JPL
508453	2016 NF_{1}	—	September 30, 2010	Kitt Peak	Spacewatch	·	1.1 km	MPC · JPL
508454	2016 NH_{2}	—	January 7, 2010	Kitt Peak	Spacewatch	EUN	1.4 km	MPC · JPL
508455	2016 NY_{12}	—	September 25, 2006	Catalina	CSS	·	3.4 km	MPC · JPL
508456	2016 NA_{17}	—	April 23, 2007	Kitt Peak	Spacewatch	·	1.3 km	MPC · JPL
508457	2016 NB_{17}	—	November 28, 2013	Kitt Peak	Spacewatch	EUN	1.3 km	MPC · JPL
508458	2016 NN_{17}	—	January 24, 2015	Haleakala	Pan-STARRS 1	(194)	2.0 km	MPC · JPL
508459	2016 NO_{21}	—	June 29, 2008	Siding Spring	SSS	·	2.2 km	MPC · JPL
508460	2016 NK_{23}	—	October 6, 2012	Haleakala	Pan-STARRS 1	·	1.9 km	MPC · JPL
508461	2016 NV_{23}	—	January 12, 2008	Mount Lemmon	Mount Lemmon Survey	·	1.1 km	MPC · JPL
508462	2016 NU_{37}	—	February 28, 2009	Mount Lemmon	Mount Lemmon Survey	·	2.9 km	MPC · JPL
508463	2016 NL_{46}	—	November 2, 2008	Kitt Peak	Spacewatch	·	1.9 km	MPC · JPL
508464	2016 NM_{52}	—	February 16, 2010	Kitt Peak	Spacewatch	·	1.5 km	MPC · JPL
508465	2016 NG_{63}	—	February 28, 2014	Haleakala	Pan-STARRS 1	·	1.9 km	MPC · JPL
508466	2016 NB_{65}	—	March 28, 2015	Haleakala	Pan-STARRS 1	·	2.2 km	MPC · JPL
508467	2016 ND_{65}	—	February 20, 2014	Mount Lemmon	Mount Lemmon Survey	·	1.6 km	MPC · JPL
508468	2016 NF_{65}	—	April 14, 2007	Mount Lemmon	Mount Lemmon Survey	(5)	1.5 km	MPC · JPL
508469	2016 NQ_{65}	—	July 14, 2016	Haleakala	Pan-STARRS 1	·	1.6 km	MPC · JPL
508470	2016 NU_{65}	—	December 18, 2007	Mount Lemmon	Mount Lemmon Survey	·	2.9 km	MPC · JPL
508471	2016 NA_{66}	—	January 13, 2008	Mount Lemmon	Mount Lemmon Survey	·	2.3 km	MPC · JPL
508472	2016 NB_{66}	—	February 4, 2006	Catalina	CSS	EUN	1.3 km	MPC · JPL
508473	2016 NF_{66}	—	October 7, 2008	Mount Lemmon	Mount Lemmon Survey	·	1.8 km	MPC · JPL
508474	2016 OR_{1}	—	September 6, 2008	Mount Lemmon	Mount Lemmon Survey	·	1.6 km	MPC · JPL
508475	2016 OX_{1}	—	April 19, 2007	Kitt Peak	Spacewatch	EUN	790 m	MPC · JPL
508476	2016 PG_{2}	—	November 6, 2013	Haleakala	Pan-STARRS 1	MAR	1.3 km	MPC · JPL
508477	2016 PV_{9}	—	December 12, 2012	Mount Lemmon	Mount Lemmon Survey	·	1.9 km	MPC · JPL
508478	2016 PC_{12}	—	October 2, 2008	Kitt Peak	Spacewatch	·	1.4 km	MPC · JPL
508479	2016 PZ_{13}	—	May 8, 2006	Kitt Peak	Spacewatch	·	1.7 km	MPC · JPL
508480	2016 PF_{37}	—	May 3, 2010	Kitt Peak	Spacewatch	·	2.4 km	MPC · JPL
508481	2016 PE_{41}	—	December 30, 2007	Mount Lemmon	Mount Lemmon Survey	·	2.9 km	MPC · JPL
508482	2016 PT_{57}	—	September 8, 2011	Haleakala	Pan-STARRS 1	·	2.6 km	MPC · JPL
508483	2016 PW_{61}	—	March 25, 2015	Haleakala	Pan-STARRS 1	EUN	1.2 km	MPC · JPL
508484	2016 PD_{66}	—	March 13, 2010	WISE	WISE	·	3.8 km	MPC · JPL
508485	2016 PR_{67}	—	February 13, 2008	Kitt Peak	Spacewatch	·	3.0 km	MPC · JPL
508486	2016 PZ_{67}	—	October 22, 2003	Kitt Peak	Spacewatch	·	2.6 km	MPC · JPL
508487	2016 PN_{70}	—	May 25, 2015	Haleakala	Pan-STARRS 1	EOS	1.6 km	MPC · JPL
508488	2016 PM_{71}	—	April 20, 2015	Haleakala	Pan-STARRS 1	NAE	1.7 km	MPC · JPL
508489	2016 PC_{72}	—	January 31, 2008	Catalina	CSS	·	2.7 km	MPC · JPL
508490	2016 PO_{72}	—	December 30, 2008	Kitt Peak	Spacewatch	·	2.1 km	MPC · JPL
508491	2016 PG_{77}	—	August 3, 2004	Siding Spring	SSS	·	3.5 km	MPC · JPL
508492	2016 PA_{89}	—	September 18, 1998	Kitt Peak	Spacewatch	·	1.7 km	MPC · JPL
508493	2016 PH_{89}	—	April 25, 2015	Haleakala	Pan-STARRS 1	·	1.5 km	MPC · JPL
508494	2016 PN_{89}	—	October 7, 2007	Mount Lemmon	Mount Lemmon Survey	AGN	1.3 km	MPC · JPL
508495	2016 PA_{90}	—	October 25, 2005	Mount Lemmon	Mount Lemmon Survey	·	2.5 km	MPC · JPL
508496	2016 QJ	—	June 18, 2010	Mount Lemmon	Mount Lemmon Survey	·	3.7 km	MPC · JPL
508497	2016 QY	—	October 1, 2011	Kitt Peak	Spacewatch	·	3.0 km	MPC · JPL
508498	2016 QU_{2}	—	May 14, 2008	Mount Lemmon	Mount Lemmon Survey	NYS	1.1 km	MPC · JPL
508499	2016 QS_{4}	—	October 18, 2011	Haleakala	Pan-STARRS 1	·	3.1 km	MPC · JPL
508500	2016 QB_{5}	—	December 31, 2007	Mount Lemmon	Mount Lemmon Survey	EOS	1.8 km	MPC · JPL

== 508501–508600 ==
back to top

Designation			Discovery			Properties		Ref
Permanent	Provisional	Named after	Date	Site	Discoverer(s)	Category	Diam.	Ref
508501	2016 QP_{15}	—	September 25, 1995	Kitt Peak	Spacewatch	·	2.2 km	MPC · JPL
508502	2016 QA_{16}	—	December 5, 2007	Mount Lemmon	Mount Lemmon Survey	(8737)	3.0 km	MPC · JPL
508503	2016 QF_{19}	—	October 21, 2012	Kitt Peak	Spacewatch	·	2.1 km	MPC · JPL
508504	2016 QH_{19}	—	November 4, 2007	Mount Lemmon	Mount Lemmon Survey	EOS	2.6 km	MPC · JPL
508505	2016 QY_{20}	—	April 20, 2010	WISE	WISE	·	3.6 km	MPC · JPL
508506	2016 QT_{24}	—	February 1, 2006	Mount Lemmon	Mount Lemmon Survey	·	1.8 km	MPC · JPL
508507	2016 QO_{28}	—	October 1, 2005	Catalina	CSS	·	4.2 km	MPC · JPL
508508	2016 QJ_{30}	—	February 26, 2014	Mount Lemmon	Mount Lemmon Survey	EOS	1.6 km	MPC · JPL
508509	2016 QE_{35}	—	November 19, 2006	Kitt Peak	Spacewatch	·	2.3 km	MPC · JPL
508510	2016 QC_{37}	—	February 28, 2010	WISE	WISE	·	3.1 km	MPC · JPL
508511	2016 QE_{43}	—	October 23, 2011	Mount Lemmon	Mount Lemmon Survey	·	3.2 km	MPC · JPL
508512	2016 QO_{52}	—	March 7, 2008	Mount Lemmon	Mount Lemmon Survey	·	2.2 km	MPC · JPL
508513	2016 QX_{55}	—	October 13, 2006	Kitt Peak	Spacewatch	·	2.7 km	MPC · JPL
508514	2016 QN_{56}	—	October 18, 2003	Kitt Peak	Spacewatch	HNS	1.4 km	MPC · JPL
508515	2016 QK_{60}	—	March 31, 2009	Kitt Peak	Spacewatch	VER	2.9 km	MPC · JPL
508516	2016 QY_{62}	—	September 23, 2011	Kitt Peak	Spacewatch	·	2.4 km	MPC · JPL
508517	2016 QW_{63}	—	August 29, 2005	Kitt Peak	Spacewatch	·	2.8 km	MPC · JPL
508518	2016 QS_{71}	—	July 15, 2005	Kitt Peak	Spacewatch	·	2.9 km	MPC · JPL
508519	2016 QG_{79}	—	November 12, 2007	Mount Lemmon	Mount Lemmon Survey	·	3.1 km	MPC · JPL
508520	2016 QZ_{81}	—	September 14, 2006	Kitt Peak	Spacewatch	·	1.9 km	MPC · JPL
508521	2016 QK_{82}	—	November 30, 2006	Kitt Peak	Spacewatch	·	4.5 km	MPC · JPL
508522	2016 QB_{85}	—	April 24, 2010	WISE	WISE	T_{j} (2.98) · EUP	4.5 km	MPC · JPL
508523	2016 QF_{85}	—	August 29, 2005	Kitt Peak	Spacewatch	·	3.0 km	MPC · JPL
508524	2016 QU_{87}	—	March 4, 2008	Mount Lemmon	Mount Lemmon Survey	EOS	2.1 km	MPC · JPL
508525	2016 RN_{3}	—	March 29, 1995	Kitt Peak	Spacewatch	PHO	1.2 km	MPC · JPL
508526	2016 RX_{6}	—	April 28, 2010	WISE	WISE	·	3.6 km	MPC · JPL
508527	2016 RD_{11}	—	September 25, 2012	Mount Lemmon	Mount Lemmon Survey	·	1.4 km	MPC · JPL
508528	2016 RQ_{11}	—	February 18, 2015	Haleakala	Pan-STARRS 1	·	3.2 km	MPC · JPL
508529	2016 RR_{22}	—	March 12, 2010	Kitt Peak	Spacewatch	·	1.9 km	MPC · JPL
508530	2016 RR_{23}	—	October 18, 2012	Haleakala	Pan-STARRS 1	·	1.9 km	MPC · JPL
508531	2016 RG_{33}	—	August 28, 2005	Kitt Peak	Spacewatch	·	3.0 km	MPC · JPL
508532	2016 RH_{34}	—	February 11, 2014	Catalina	CSS	·	2.0 km	MPC · JPL
508533	2016 RD_{40}	—	November 9, 2009	Mount Lemmon	Mount Lemmon Survey	·	1.2 km	MPC · JPL
508534	2016 RD_{45}	—	May 25, 2006	Mount Lemmon	Mount Lemmon Survey	·	1.4 km	MPC · JPL
508535	2016 RF_{45}	—	February 6, 2014	Oukaïmeden	C. Rinner	·	1.9 km	MPC · JPL
508536	2016 SM	—	November 11, 2004	Catalina	CSS	·	2.1 km	MPC · JPL
508537	2016 SY_{5}	—	November 2, 2007	Kitt Peak	Spacewatch	·	3.8 km	MPC · JPL
508538	2016 SP_{12}	—	October 25, 2011	Haleakala	Pan-STARRS 1	·	3.2 km	MPC · JPL
508539	2016 ST_{32}	—	March 19, 2010	Mount Lemmon	Mount Lemmon Survey	·	1.9 km	MPC · JPL
508540	2016 SJ_{46}	—	January 23, 2015	Haleakala	Pan-STARRS 1	·	2.7 km	MPC · JPL
508541	2016 TM_{4}	—	September 14, 2006	Kitt Peak	Spacewatch	·	2.1 km	MPC · JPL
508542	2016 TN_{8}	—	February 27, 2000	Kitt Peak	Spacewatch	CYB	4.8 km	MPC · JPL
508543	2016 TD_{9}	—	November 14, 2007	Kitt Peak	Spacewatch	·	2.4 km	MPC · JPL
508544	2016 TH_{12}	—	September 25, 2007	Mount Lemmon	Mount Lemmon Survey	·	3.3 km	MPC · JPL
508545	2016 TR_{20}	—	April 30, 2009	Catalina	CSS	·	3.6 km	MPC · JPL
508546	2016 TJ_{83}	—	October 11, 2005	Kitt Peak	Spacewatch	·	2.4 km	MPC · JPL
508547	2016 TK_{90}	—	March 6, 2008	Mount Lemmon	Mount Lemmon Survey	EOS	2.0 km	MPC · JPL
508548	2016 UV_{15}	—	March 19, 2009	Kitt Peak	Spacewatch	·	2.9 km	MPC · JPL
508549	2016 UQ_{24}	—	November 12, 2012	Kitt Peak	Spacewatch	·	2.3 km	MPC · JPL
508550	2016 UZ_{30}	—	July 12, 2010	WISE	WISE	URS	3.2 km	MPC · JPL
508551	2016 UG_{35}	—	October 25, 2005	Mount Lemmon	Mount Lemmon Survey	·	2.8 km	MPC · JPL
508552	2016 US_{44}	—	December 28, 2003	Kitt Peak	Spacewatch	·	2.5 km	MPC · JPL
508553	2016 UX_{45}	—	July 12, 2010	WISE	WISE	·	4.5 km	MPC · JPL
508554	2016 UP_{47}	—	March 9, 2005	Kitt Peak	Spacewatch	·	2.3 km	MPC · JPL
508555	2016 UV_{56}	—	January 2, 2001	Socorro	LINEAR	·	3.8 km	MPC · JPL
508556	2016 UU_{57}	—	March 27, 2000	Kitt Peak	Spacewatch	WAT	1.9 km	MPC · JPL
508557	2016 UV_{62}	—	December 6, 2002	Socorro	LINEAR	·	2.1 km	MPC · JPL
508558	2016 UO_{87}	—	October 29, 2008	Kitt Peak	Spacewatch	RAF	1.1 km	MPC · JPL
508559	2016 UA_{130}	—	October 26, 2005	Kitt Peak	Spacewatch	·	3.1 km	MPC · JPL
508560	2016 UT_{142}	—	October 30, 2008	Catalina	CSS	EUN	1.3 km	MPC · JPL
508561	2016 UR_{145}	—	October 26, 2005	Kitt Peak	Spacewatch	VER	2.9 km	MPC · JPL
508562	2016 VU	—	April 11, 2010	WISE	WISE	·	4.2 km	MPC · JPL
508563	2016 VE_{11}	—	February 22, 2007	Kitt Peak	Spacewatch	·	2.8 km	MPC · JPL
508564	2016 WP_{28}	—	February 22, 2007	Kitt Peak	Spacewatch	·	3.0 km	MPC · JPL
508565	2016 WM_{36}	—	July 17, 2009	La Sagra	OAM	·	3.5 km	MPC · JPL
508566	2016 WD_{40}	—	December 13, 2006	Kitt Peak	Spacewatch	·	2.6 km	MPC · JPL
508567	2016 XH_{6}	—	June 29, 1995	Kitt Peak	Spacewatch	·	1.8 km	MPC · JPL
508568	2016 XR_{7}	—	March 29, 2008	Mount Lemmon	Mount Lemmon Survey	·	4.4 km	MPC · JPL
508569	2017 FP_{106}	—	March 12, 2013	Catalina	CSS	·	1.1 km	MPC · JPL
508570	2017 FN_{121}	—	June 14, 2009	Mount Lemmon	Mount Lemmon Survey	·	1.1 km	MPC · JPL
508571	2017 NB_{2}	—	September 2, 2008	La Sagra	OAM	·	1.8 km	MPC · JPL
508572	2017 NE_{4}	—	September 27, 2009	Mount Lemmon	Mount Lemmon Survey	·	1.1 km	MPC · JPL
508573	2017 NL_{4}	—	February 8, 2011	Mount Lemmon	Mount Lemmon Survey	EUN	1.3 km	MPC · JPL
508574	2017 NO_{5}	—	February 13, 2010	WISE	WISE	·	3.8 km	MPC · JPL
508575	2017 OF_{2}	—	August 27, 1998	Kitt Peak	Spacewatch	NYS	1.3 km	MPC · JPL
508576	2017 OO_{3}	—	October 15, 2007	Mount Lemmon	Mount Lemmon Survey	THM	2.1 km	MPC · JPL
508577	2017 OT_{3}	—	February 3, 2009	Kitt Peak	Spacewatch	VER	3.2 km	MPC · JPL
508578	2017 OW_{5}	—	October 10, 2007	Mount Lemmon	Mount Lemmon Survey	·	2.2 km	MPC · JPL
508579	2017 OP_{7}	—	April 4, 2010	WISE	WISE	·	3.7 km	MPC · JPL
508580	2017 OY_{7}	—	August 28, 2001	Kitt Peak	Spacewatch	THM	1.8 km	MPC · JPL
508581	2017 OY_{11}	—	February 28, 2009	Kitt Peak	Spacewatch	·	880 m	MPC · JPL
508582	2017 OT_{17}	—	September 25, 1995	Kitt Peak	Spacewatch	·	1.2 km	MPC · JPL
508583	2017 OK_{30}	—	October 20, 2006	Kitt Peak	Spacewatch	·	2.8 km	MPC · JPL
508584	2017 OO_{36}	—	May 15, 2004	Campo Imperatore	CINEOS	·	2.4 km	MPC · JPL
508585	2017 OA_{39}	—	February 2, 2009	Kitt Peak	Spacewatch	·	840 m	MPC · JPL
508586	2017 OF_{43}	—	December 14, 2013	Mount Lemmon	Mount Lemmon Survey	·	2.2 km	MPC · JPL
508587	2017 OX_{46}	—	September 28, 2006	Catalina	CSS	LIX	3.8 km	MPC · JPL
508588	2017 OT_{49}	—	July 16, 2013	Haleakala	Pan-STARRS 1	·	1.2 km	MPC · JPL
508589	2017 OD_{53}	—	August 26, 2012	Haleakala	Pan-STARRS 1	EOS	1.8 km	MPC · JPL
508590	2017 OW_{56}	—	May 3, 2008	Mount Lemmon	Mount Lemmon Survey	·	810 m	MPC · JPL
508591	2017 OF_{60}	—	December 3, 1996	Kitt Peak	Spacewatch	·	1.2 km	MPC · JPL
508592	2017 OQ_{60}	—	April 21, 1996	Kitt Peak	Spacewatch	·	770 m	MPC · JPL
508593	2017 OU_{60}	—	December 6, 2010	Kitt Peak	Spacewatch	·	1.2 km	MPC · JPL
508594	2017 OJ_{61}	—	September 3, 2007	Catalina	CSS	·	450 m	MPC · JPL
508595	2017 OQ_{61}	—	March 25, 2012	Mount Lemmon	Mount Lemmon Survey	·	1.3 km	MPC · JPL
508596	2017 QS_{3}	—	December 18, 2014	Haleakala	Pan-STARRS 1	V	740 m	MPC · JPL
508597	2017 QZ_{3}	—	November 2, 2007	Mount Lemmon	Mount Lemmon Survey	·	660 m	MPC · JPL
508598	2017 QO_{11}	—	October 4, 2004	Kitt Peak	Spacewatch	·	1.5 km	MPC · JPL
508599	2017 QQ_{20}	—	September 15, 2013	Haleakala	Pan-STARRS 1	·	1.3 km	MPC · JPL
508600	2017 RU_{3}	—	January 14, 2016	Haleakala	Pan-STARRS 1	·	820 m	MPC · JPL

== 508601–508700 ==
back to top

Designation			Discovery			Properties		Ref
Permanent	Provisional	Named after	Date	Site	Discoverer(s)	Category	Diam.	Ref
508601	2017 RQ_{5}	—	September 3, 2008	Kitt Peak	Spacewatch	·	1.9 km	MPC · JPL
508602	2017 RY_{7}	—	April 7, 2006	Kitt Peak	Spacewatch	(16286)	1.9 km	MPC · JPL
508603	2017 RW_{16}	—	October 19, 2006	Catalina	CSS	·	3.2 km	MPC · JPL
508604	2017 ST_{8}	—	October 11, 2004	Kitt Peak	Spacewatch	·	1.6 km	MPC · JPL
508605	2017 SZ_{9}	—	December 6, 2007	Kitt Peak	Spacewatch	·	770 m	MPC · JPL
508606	2017 SH_{13}	—	August 29, 2000	Socorro	LINEAR	·	1.6 km	MPC · JPL
508607	2017 SB_{19}	—	October 27, 2006	Catalina	CSS	H	590 m	MPC · JPL
508608	2017 SG_{22}	—	September 20, 2003	Kitt Peak	Spacewatch	V	550 m	MPC · JPL
508609	2017 SM_{22}	—	July 18, 2013	Haleakala	Pan-STARRS 1	ADE	1.6 km	MPC · JPL
508610	2017 SG_{23}	—	September 18, 2009	Kitt Peak	Spacewatch	·	940 m	MPC · JPL
508611	2017 SP_{26}	—	September 4, 2008	Kitt Peak	Spacewatch	MRX	1.0 km	MPC · JPL
508612	2017 SP_{33}	—	September 21, 2009	Mount Lemmon	Mount Lemmon Survey	·	1.4 km	MPC · JPL
508613	2017 SW_{34}	—	October 10, 2007	Catalina	CSS	·	880 m	MPC · JPL
508614	2017 SN_{35}	—	September 27, 2008	Mount Lemmon	Mount Lemmon Survey	·	1.8 km	MPC · JPL
508615	2017 SE_{36}	—	March 23, 2004	Kitt Peak	Spacewatch	·	2.4 km	MPC · JPL
508616	2017 SR_{37}	—	November 24, 1997	Kitt Peak	Spacewatch	·	1.1 km	MPC · JPL
508617	2017 SP_{38}	—	August 22, 2004	Kitt Peak	Spacewatch	EUN	1.4 km	MPC · JPL
508618	2017 SQ_{38}	—	October 8, 2012	Kitt Peak	Spacewatch	TIR	2.9 km	MPC · JPL
508619	2017 SA_{39}	—	March 21, 2010	Kitt Peak	Spacewatch	·	2.5 km	MPC · JPL
508620	2017 SG_{39}	—	November 25, 2005	Mount Lemmon	Mount Lemmon Survey	·	1.6 km	MPC · JPL
508621	2017 SD_{40}	—	November 24, 2009	Kitt Peak	Spacewatch	·	1.3 km	MPC · JPL
508622	2017 SG_{40}	—	March 1, 2009	Kitt Peak	Spacewatch	·	3.1 km	MPC · JPL
508623	2017 SR_{40}	—	February 19, 2009	Kitt Peak	Spacewatch	·	2.7 km	MPC · JPL
508624	2017 SU_{40}	—	December 4, 2012	Mount Lemmon	Mount Lemmon Survey	·	3.1 km	MPC · JPL
508625	2017 SA_{41}	—	May 21, 2006	Kitt Peak	Spacewatch	KOR	1.3 km	MPC · JPL
508626	2017 SH_{41}	—	March 21, 2010	Mount Lemmon	Mount Lemmon Survey	·	3.1 km	MPC · JPL
508627	2017 SN_{41}	—	September 20, 2006	Catalina	CSS	·	1.1 km	MPC · JPL
508628	2017 SD_{42}	—	June 21, 2010	Mount Lemmon	Mount Lemmon Survey	·	580 m	MPC · JPL
508629	2017 SR_{42}	—	August 6, 2008	Siding Spring	SSS	·	1.9 km	MPC · JPL
508630	2017 SV_{42}	—	September 18, 2003	Kitt Peak	Spacewatch	·	1.9 km	MPC · JPL
508631	2017 TM	—	December 24, 2006	Mount Lemmon	Mount Lemmon Survey	H	610 m	MPC · JPL
508632	2017 TC_{2}	—	October 7, 2004	Socorro	LINEAR	·	2.0 km	MPC · JPL
508633	2017 TL_{3}	—	September 18, 2009	Mount Lemmon	Mount Lemmon Survey	MAR	1.1 km	MPC · JPL
508634	2017 TN_{7}	—	October 7, 2008	Kitt Peak	Spacewatch	HOF	2.4 km	MPC · JPL
508635	2017 TF_{8}	—	November 2, 2010	Kitt Peak	Spacewatch	·	990 m	MPC · JPL
508636	2017 TO_{8}	—	January 8, 2010	Catalina	CSS	·	2.9 km	MPC · JPL
508637	2017 TE_{9}	—	November 2, 2010	Mount Lemmon	Mount Lemmon Survey	·	1.0 km	MPC · JPL
508638	2017 TH_{9}	—	January 19, 2004	Kitt Peak	Spacewatch	·	2.0 km	MPC · JPL
508639	2017 TM_{9}	—	December 14, 2010	Mount Lemmon	Mount Lemmon Survey	·	950 m	MPC · JPL
508640	2017 TR_{9}	—	April 17, 2009	Kitt Peak	Spacewatch	·	870 m	MPC · JPL
508641	2017 TA_{10}	—	October 22, 2008	Kitt Peak	Spacewatch	KOR	1.5 km	MPC · JPL
508642	2017 TH_{10}	—	September 26, 2006	Mount Lemmon	Mount Lemmon Survey	·	4.5 km	MPC · JPL
508643	2017 TT_{10}	—	March 20, 2007	Kitt Peak	Spacewatch	·	1.0 km	MPC · JPL
508644	2017 TZ_{10}	—	November 21, 2003	Socorro	LINEAR	·	840 m	MPC · JPL
508645	2017 TF_{11}	—	September 25, 1998	Kitt Peak	Spacewatch	·	830 m	MPC · JPL
508646	2017 TJ_{11}	—	December 6, 2005	Kitt Peak	Spacewatch	(5)	1.5 km	MPC · JPL
508647	2017 TL_{11}	—	October 25, 2003	Socorro	LINEAR	MRX	1 km	MPC · JPL
508648	2017 TT_{11}	—	October 5, 1996	Kitt Peak	Spacewatch	·	1.2 km	MPC · JPL
508649	2017 TV_{11}	—	October 2, 2008	Catalina	CSS	·	2.2 km	MPC · JPL
508650	2017 TD_{12}	—	October 2, 2000	Socorro	LINEAR	EUP	3.4 km	MPC · JPL
508651	2017 TF_{12}	—	May 13, 2005	Mount Lemmon	Mount Lemmon Survey	·	3.4 km	MPC · JPL
508652	2017 TL_{12}	—	February 11, 2008	Mount Lemmon	Mount Lemmon Survey	·	3.7 km	MPC · JPL
508653	2017 TO_{12}	—	December 31, 2008	Mount Lemmon	Mount Lemmon Survey	·	720 m	MPC · JPL
508654	2017 TY_{12}	—	April 11, 2005	Kitt Peak	Spacewatch	·	1.3 km	MPC · JPL
508655	2017 TL_{13}	—	February 12, 2008	Mount Lemmon	Mount Lemmon Survey	V	560 m	MPC · JPL
508656	2017 UK	—	January 31, 2009	Kitt Peak	Spacewatch	·	770 m	MPC · JPL
508657	2017 UY_{1}	—	April 18, 1996	Kitt Peak	Spacewatch	H	400 m	MPC · JPL
508658	2017 UC_{2}	—	October 6, 2000	Kitt Peak	Spacewatch	·	980 m	MPC · JPL
508659	2017 UD_{2}	—	October 17, 2006	Catalina	CSS	H	690 m	MPC · JPL
508660	2017 UV_{2}	—	March 9, 2007	Mount Lemmon	Mount Lemmon Survey	·	1.5 km	MPC · JPL
508661	2017 UF_{7}	—	May 26, 2006	Mount Lemmon	Mount Lemmon Survey	H	550 m	MPC · JPL
508662	2017 UM_{8}	—	October 17, 2006	Kitt Peak	Spacewatch	EOS	2.1 km	MPC · JPL
508663	2017 UQ_{9}	—	October 2, 2000	Socorro	LINEAR	·	1.5 km	MPC · JPL
508664	2017 US_{9}	—	September 30, 2006	Catalina	CSS	·	1.4 km	MPC · JPL
508665	2017 UZ_{9}	—	October 8, 2004	Socorro	LINEAR	·	2.0 km	MPC · JPL
508666	2017 UJ_{10}	—	October 2, 2000	Socorro	LINEAR	ADE	2.0 km	MPC · JPL
508667	2017 UL_{10}	—	December 8, 2001	Socorro	LINEAR	·	2.6 km	MPC · JPL
508668	2017 US_{10}	—	August 26, 2008	Siding Spring	SSS	HNS	1.5 km	MPC · JPL
508669	2017 UV_{10}	—	September 23, 2004	Kitt Peak	Spacewatch	·	1.5 km	MPC · JPL
508670	2017 UM_{11}	—	November 21, 2000	Socorro	LINEAR	·	1.7 km	MPC · JPL
508671	2017 US_{11}	—	November 2, 2006	Catalina	CSS	·	1.4 km	MPC · JPL
508672	2017 UW_{11}	—	October 19, 2006	Catalina	CSS	·	4.0 km	MPC · JPL
508673	2017 UE_{12}	—	December 24, 2006	Kitt Peak	Spacewatch	·	1.1 km	MPC · JPL
508674	2017 UH_{12}	—	September 28, 2009	Kitt Peak	Spacewatch	·	1.4 km	MPC · JPL
508675	2017 UU_{12}	—	March 31, 2003	Socorro	LINEAR	·	2.0 km	MPC · JPL
508676	2017 UB_{13}	—	October 9, 2004	Kitt Peak	Spacewatch	·	2.1 km	MPC · JPL
508677	2017 UE_{13}	—	September 27, 2008	Mount Lemmon	Mount Lemmon Survey	·	2.2 km	MPC · JPL
508678	2017 UG_{13}	—	December 3, 2007	Kitt Peak	Spacewatch	·	3.1 km	MPC · JPL
508679	2017 UN_{13}	—	January 15, 2000	Kitt Peak	Spacewatch	·	1.4 km	MPC · JPL
508680	2017 UC_{14}	—	September 30, 2005	Kitt Peak	Spacewatch	·	950 m	MPC · JPL
508681	2017 US_{15}	—	October 1, 2005	Mount Lemmon	Mount Lemmon Survey	·	1.0 km	MPC · JPL
508682	2017 UV_{15}	—	October 21, 2000	Kitt Peak	Spacewatch	·	3.2 km	MPC · JPL
508683	2017 UT_{16}	—	March 30, 2011	Mount Lemmon	Mount Lemmon Survey	·	1.7 km	MPC · JPL
508684	2017 UU_{16}	—	February 9, 2008	Kitt Peak	Spacewatch	·	1.3 km	MPC · JPL
508685	2017 UZ_{16}	—	October 9, 2004	Kitt Peak	Spacewatch	·	1.8 km	MPC · JPL
508686	2017 UD_{17}	—	November 5, 1999	Kitt Peak	Spacewatch	·	830 m	MPC · JPL
508687	2017 UJ_{17}	—	August 28, 2006	Kitt Peak	Spacewatch	·	1.9 km	MPC · JPL
508688	2017 UL_{17}	—	September 27, 2006	Kitt Peak	Spacewatch	·	2.7 km	MPC · JPL
508689	2017 UP_{17}	—	September 14, 1998	Kitt Peak	Spacewatch	·	1.5 km	MPC · JPL
508690	2017 UT_{17}	—	February 25, 2011	Mount Lemmon	Mount Lemmon Survey	HNS	1.1 km	MPC · JPL
508691	2017 UC_{18}	—	September 29, 2000	Kitt Peak	Spacewatch	·	2.3 km	MPC · JPL
508692	2017 UE_{18}	—	September 17, 2009	Mount Lemmon	Mount Lemmon Survey	·	870 m	MPC · JPL
508693	2017 UK_{18}	—	October 9, 2004	Kitt Peak	Spacewatch	·	1.8 km	MPC · JPL
508694	2017 UG_{19}	—	August 21, 2006	Kitt Peak	Spacewatch	·	980 m	MPC · JPL
508695	2017 UK_{19}	—	October 27, 2005	Mount Lemmon	Mount Lemmon Survey	·	680 m	MPC · JPL
508696	2017 UL_{19}	—	October 1, 2005	Kitt Peak	Spacewatch	·	940 m	MPC · JPL
508697	2017 UQ_{19}	—	September 18, 1995	Kitt Peak	Spacewatch	·	2.5 km	MPC · JPL
508698	2017 US_{19}	—	March 28, 2008	Mount Lemmon	Mount Lemmon Survey	·	1.4 km	MPC · JPL
508699	2017 UY_{19}	—	February 27, 2003	Campo Imperatore	CINEOS	VER	3.0 km	MPC · JPL
508700	2017 UA_{20}	—	September 17, 2006	Kitt Peak	Spacewatch	·	3.9 km	MPC · JPL

== 508701–508800 ==
back to top

Designation			Discovery			Properties		Ref
Permanent	Provisional	Named after	Date	Site	Discoverer(s)	Category	Diam.	Ref
508701	2017 UP_{20}	—	October 22, 2003	Apache Point	SDSS	·	2.7 km	MPC · JPL
508702	2017 UR_{20}	—	November 22, 2006	Mount Lemmon	Mount Lemmon Survey	NYS	980 m	MPC · JPL
508703	2017 UW_{20}	—	April 5, 2010	Kitt Peak	Spacewatch	·	2.9 km	MPC · JPL
508704	2017 UY_{20}	—	August 19, 2006	Kitt Peak	Spacewatch	EOS	1.7 km	MPC · JPL
508705	2017 UB_{22}	—	February 22, 2004	Kitt Peak	Spacewatch	·	1.8 km	MPC · JPL
508706	2017 UH_{22}	—	September 6, 2008	Mount Lemmon	Mount Lemmon Survey	·	1.3 km	MPC · JPL
508707	2017 UN_{22}	—	November 30, 2003	Kitt Peak	Spacewatch	·	2.7 km	MPC · JPL
508708	2017 UR_{22}	—	December 22, 2005	Kitt Peak	Spacewatch	·	1.4 km	MPC · JPL
508709	2017 UY_{22}	—	November 21, 2005	Anderson Mesa	LONEOS	·	1.4 km	MPC · JPL
508710	2017 UC_{23}	—	January 31, 2006	Kitt Peak	Spacewatch	·	1.7 km	MPC · JPL
508711	2017 UD_{23}	—	January 23, 2006	Mount Lemmon	Mount Lemmon Survey	·	1.6 km	MPC · JPL
508712	2017 UP_{23}	—	September 23, 2004	Kitt Peak	Spacewatch	·	1.2 km	MPC · JPL
508713	2017 UB_{24}	—	November 10, 2006	Kitt Peak	Spacewatch	·	930 m	MPC · JPL
508714	2017 UT_{24}	—	June 21, 2011	Kitt Peak	Spacewatch	THM	2.5 km	MPC · JPL
508715	2017 UQ_{25}	—	December 2, 1994	Kitt Peak	Spacewatch	·	1.0 km	MPC · JPL
508716	2017 UU_{25}	—	June 16, 2012	Mount Lemmon	Mount Lemmon Survey	·	1.6 km	MPC · JPL
508717	2017 UK_{26}	—	September 11, 2004	Kitt Peak	Spacewatch	·	1.3 km	MPC · JPL
508718	2017 UQ_{26}	—	April 13, 2013	Haleakala	Pan-STARRS 1	·	670 m	MPC · JPL
508719	2017 UR_{26}	—	November 8, 2009	Mount Lemmon	Mount Lemmon Survey	(5)	850 m	MPC · JPL
508720	2017 UY_{26}	—	September 17, 2012	Mount Lemmon	Mount Lemmon Survey	·	1.5 km	MPC · JPL
508721	2017 UA_{27}	—	December 13, 2004	Kitt Peak	Spacewatch	·	1.6 km	MPC · JPL
508722	2017 UF_{27}	—	October 10, 2007	Mount Lemmon	Mount Lemmon Survey	·	3.8 km	MPC · JPL
508723	2017 UL_{27}	—	September 22, 2008	Kitt Peak	Spacewatch	·	1.5 km	MPC · JPL
508724	2017 US_{27}	—	September 12, 2007	Mount Lemmon	Mount Lemmon Survey	KOR	1.4 km	MPC · JPL
508725	2017 UV_{27}	—	October 5, 2003	Kitt Peak	Spacewatch	·	2.2 km	MPC · JPL
508726	2017 UA_{28}	—	August 9, 2013	Haleakala	Pan-STARRS 1	MAS	620 m	MPC · JPL
508727	2017 UF_{28}	—	April 5, 2011	Kitt Peak	Spacewatch	·	1.6 km	MPC · JPL
508728	2017 UG_{28}	—	October 6, 1996	Kitt Peak	Spacewatch	·	920 m	MPC · JPL
508729	2017 UH_{28}	—	September 11, 2004	Kitt Peak	Spacewatch	·	590 m	MPC · JPL
508730	2017 UO_{28}	—	March 27, 2003	Kitt Peak	Spacewatch	·	1.7 km	MPC · JPL
508731	2017 UQ_{28}	—	March 29, 2011	Kitt Peak	Spacewatch	·	2.0 km	MPC · JPL
508732	2017 UR_{28}	—	January 19, 2004	Kitt Peak	Spacewatch	MAS	470 m	MPC · JPL
508733	2017 UB_{29}	—	September 27, 2006	Kitt Peak	Spacewatch	·	2.7 km	MPC · JPL
508734	2017 UD_{29}	—	October 20, 2007	Mount Lemmon	Mount Lemmon Survey	·	550 m	MPC · JPL
508735	2017 UE_{29}	—	November 11, 2004	Kitt Peak	Spacewatch	·	1.7 km	MPC · JPL
508736	2017 UQ_{29}	—	September 14, 2006	Catalina	CSS	·	2.8 km	MPC · JPL
508737	2017 UD_{30}	—	December 15, 2006	Kitt Peak	Spacewatch	NYS	840 m	MPC · JPL
508738	2017 UJ_{30}	—	September 16, 2003	Kitt Peak	Spacewatch	·	770 m	MPC · JPL
508739	2017 UV_{30}	—	June 30, 2005	Kitt Peak	Spacewatch	·	1.2 km	MPC · JPL
508740	2017 UA_{32}	—	October 20, 2006	Kitt Peak	Spacewatch	V	570 m	MPC · JPL
508741	2017 UB_{32}	—	September 9, 2004	Kitt Peak	Spacewatch	·	1.5 km	MPC · JPL
508742	2017 UF_{33}	—	September 27, 2006	Kitt Peak	Spacewatch	·	3.1 km	MPC · JPL
508743	2017 UP_{33}	—	September 18, 2003	Kitt Peak	Spacewatch	HOF	3.8 km	MPC · JPL
508744	2017 UH_{34}	—	July 8, 2005	Kitt Peak	Spacewatch	·	1.1 km	MPC · JPL
508745	2017 UJ_{34}	—	September 17, 2004	Kitt Peak	Spacewatch	(29841)	1.4 km	MPC · JPL
508746	2017 UP_{34}	—	August 26, 2000	Socorro	LINEAR	(5)	1.2 km	MPC · JPL
508747	2017 UV_{34}	—	August 28, 2006	Catalina	CSS	·	1.0 km	MPC · JPL
508748	2017 UX_{35}	—	October 27, 2006	Catalina	CSS	·	3.5 km	MPC · JPL
508749	2017 UA_{36}	—	November 1, 2006	Mount Lemmon	Mount Lemmon Survey	·	2.7 km	MPC · JPL
508750	2017 UL_{36}	—	November 17, 2006	Kitt Peak	Spacewatch	·	3.1 km	MPC · JPL
508751	2017 UM_{36}	—	March 14, 2007	Mount Lemmon	Mount Lemmon Survey	·	1.9 km	MPC · JPL
508752	2017 UO_{36}	—	October 6, 2004	Kitt Peak	Spacewatch	EUN	930 m	MPC · JPL
508753	2017 UQ_{36}	—	October 8, 1994	Kitt Peak	Spacewatch	·	3.0 km	MPC · JPL
508754	2017 UT_{36}	—	September 28, 2003	Kitt Peak	Spacewatch	·	2.2 km	MPC · JPL
508755	2017 UD_{37}	—	August 2, 2011	Haleakala	Pan-STARRS 1	·	2.6 km	MPC · JPL
508756	2017 UP_{37}	—	January 8, 2006	Kitt Peak	Spacewatch	·	910 m	MPC · JPL
508757	2017 UH_{38}	—	April 4, 2003	Kitt Peak	Spacewatch	(1118)	4.4 km	MPC · JPL
508758	2017 UP_{38}	—	December 5, 2007	Kitt Peak	Spacewatch	VER	2.3 km	MPC · JPL
508759	2017 UR_{38}	—	December 30, 2007	Kitt Peak	Spacewatch	·	2.4 km	MPC · JPL
508760	2017 UY_{38}	—	March 26, 2006	Kitt Peak	Spacewatch	·	2.2 km	MPC · JPL
508761	2017 UQ_{40}	—	November 29, 2005	Kitt Peak	Spacewatch	·	1.1 km	MPC · JPL
508762	2017 UW_{40}	—	January 19, 2005	Kitt Peak	Spacewatch	·	2.1 km	MPC · JPL
508763	2017 UO_{41}	—	October 13, 2006	Kitt Peak	Spacewatch	VER	2.7 km	MPC · JPL
508764	2017 UQ_{42}	—	December 11, 2004	Kitt Peak	Spacewatch	·	650 m	MPC · JPL
508765	2108 P-L	—	September 24, 1960	Palomar	C. J. van Houten, I. van Houten-Groeneveld, T. Gehrels	·	730 m	MPC · JPL
508766	1991 VX_{10}	—	November 5, 1991	Kitt Peak	Spacewatch	·	940 m	MPC · JPL
508767	1993 BD_{2}	—	January 22, 1993	Kitt Peak	Spacewatch	AMO +1km	810 m	MPC · JPL
508768	1995 UB_{73}	—	October 20, 1995	Kitt Peak	Spacewatch	MAS	490 m	MPC · JPL
508769	1995 VU_{17}	—	November 15, 1995	Kitt Peak	Spacewatch	·	650 m	MPC · JPL
508770	1995 WY_{2}	—	November 18, 1995	Mauna Kea	D. C. Jewitt, J. X. Luu	cubewano (cold)	130 km	MPC · JPL
508771	1997 JA_{10}	—	May 10, 1997	Mauna Kea	Veillet, C.	·	1.9 km	MPC · JPL
508772	1998 WP_{7}	—	November 23, 1998	Anderson Mesa	LONEOS	APO	380 m	MPC · JPL
508773	1998 WQ_{39}	—	November 14, 1998	Kitt Peak	Spacewatch	V	500 m	MPC · JPL
508774	1999 JE_{1}	—	May 7, 1999	Catalina	CSS	APO · PHA	340 m	MPC · JPL
508775	1999 RW_{105}	—	September 7, 1999	Catalina	CSS	JUN	900 m	MPC · JPL
508776	1999 RF_{108}	—	September 8, 1999	Socorro	LINEAR	·	1.7 km	MPC · JPL
508777	1999 TZ_{156}	—	October 9, 1999	Socorro	LINEAR	·	660 m	MPC · JPL
508778	1999 VQ_{19}	—	November 4, 1999	Kitt Peak	Spacewatch	·	1.4 km	MPC · JPL
508779	1999 VB_{138}	—	November 4, 1999	Catalina	CSS	·	880 m	MPC · JPL
508780	1999 VU_{152}	—	November 10, 1999	Kitt Peak	Spacewatch	·	1.0 km	MPC · JPL
508781	1999 VZ_{152}	—	November 11, 1999	Kitt Peak	Spacewatch	·	1.1 km	MPC · JPL
508782	1999 VN_{211}	—	November 15, 1999	Socorro	LINEAR	·	770 m	MPC · JPL
508783	1999 XE_{49}	—	December 7, 1999	Socorro	LINEAR	·	2.2 km	MPC · JPL
508784	1999 XV_{81}	—	December 7, 1999	Socorro	LINEAR	·	1.0 km	MPC · JPL
508785	2000 AY_{226}	—	January 9, 2000	Kitt Peak	Spacewatch	·	1.8 km	MPC · JPL
508786	2000 BL_{19}	—	January 30, 2000	Catalina	CSS	T_{j} (2.98) · APO	340 m	MPC · JPL
508787	2000 BJ_{50}	—	January 16, 2000	Kitt Peak	Spacewatch	·	1.3 km	MPC · JPL
508788	2000 CQ_{114}	—	February 6, 2000	Kitt Peak	M. W. Buie	cubewano (cold) · moon	91 km	MPC · JPL
508789	2000 DF_{11}	—	February 27, 2000	Kitt Peak	Spacewatch	H	480 m	MPC · JPL
508790	2000 EA_{23}	—	March 3, 2000	Kitt Peak	Spacewatch	MAS	540 m	MPC · JPL
508791	2000 EH_{104}	—	March 12, 2000	Socorro	LINEAR	·	1.0 km	MPC · JPL
508792	2000 FX_{53}	—	March 31, 2000	Mauna Kea	C. A. Trujillo, S. S. Sheppard, D. C. Jewitt	res · 4:7	100 km	MPC · JPL
508793	2000 FM_{71}	—	March 30, 2000	Kitt Peak	Spacewatch	·	1.0 km	MPC · JPL
508794	2000 HG_{17}	—	April 24, 2000	Kitt Peak	Spacewatch	·	930 m	MPC · JPL
508795	2000 HM_{20}	—	April 29, 2000	Socorro	LINEAR	·	2.0 km	MPC · JPL
508796	2000 KN_{44}	—	May 30, 2000	Anderson Mesa	LONEOS	T_{j} (2.99) · AMO	680 m	MPC · JPL
508797	2000 PV_{5}	—	August 3, 2000	Bergisch Gladbach	W. Bickel	·	720 m	MPC · JPL
508798	2000 QB_{149}	—	August 1, 2000	Socorro	LINEAR	·	700 m	MPC · JPL
508799	2000 QM_{193}	—	August 29, 2000	Socorro	LINEAR	·	1.2 km	MPC · JPL
508800	2000 SL_{34}	—	September 24, 2000	Socorro	LINEAR	·	1.1 km	MPC · JPL

== 508801–508900 ==
back to top

Designation			Discovery			Properties		Ref
Permanent	Provisional	Named after	Date	Site	Discoverer(s)	Category	Diam.	Ref
508801	2000 SD_{72}	—	September 24, 2000	Socorro	LINEAR	·	1.2 km	MPC · JPL
508802	2000 SZ_{93}	—	September 23, 2000	Socorro	LINEAR	·	1 km	MPC · JPL
508803	2000 SO_{125}	—	September 24, 2000	Socorro	LINEAR	·	1.5 km	MPC · JPL
508804	2000 TW_{17}	—	October 1, 2000	Socorro	LINEAR	·	3.0 km	MPC · JPL
508805	2000 TT_{28}	—	October 2, 2000	Kitt Peak	Spacewatch	·	1.1 km	MPC · JPL
508806	2000 TK_{50}	—	October 1, 2000	Socorro	LINEAR	·	1.1 km	MPC · JPL
508807	2000 UE_{17}	—	October 24, 2000	Socorro	LINEAR	·	1.4 km	MPC · JPL
508808	2000 UK_{19}	—	October 24, 2000	Socorro	LINEAR	·	1.1 km	MPC · JPL
508809	2000 UV_{24}	—	October 24, 2000	Socorro	LINEAR	(5)	1.2 km	MPC · JPL
508810	2000 WD_{13}	—	November 20, 2000	Socorro	LINEAR	·	2.1 km	MPC · JPL
508811	2000 WA_{54}	—	November 19, 2000	Socorro	LINEAR	·	1.6 km	MPC · JPL
508812	2000 WX_{66}	—	November 21, 2000	Socorro	LINEAR	BAR	1.1 km	MPC · JPL
508813	2000 WZ_{109}	—	November 20, 2000	Socorro	LINEAR	·	1.7 km	MPC · JPL
508814	2000 WF_{186}	—	November 27, 2000	Socorro	LINEAR	·	1.1 km	MPC · JPL
508815	2000 XE_{2}	—	December 1, 2000	Socorro	LINEAR	·	530 m	MPC · JPL
508816	2000 XT_{23}	—	December 4, 2000	Socorro	LINEAR	·	910 m	MPC · JPL
508817	2001 CY_{10}	—	January 18, 2001	Socorro	LINEAR	·	1.4 km	MPC · JPL
508818	2001 DC_{1}	—	February 16, 2001	Višnjan	K. Korlević	·	1.8 km	MPC · JPL
508819	2001 FD_{1}	—	March 16, 2001	Kitt Peak	Spacewatch	·	950 m	MPC · JPL
508820	2001 FB_{62}	—	March 2, 2001	Anderson Mesa	LONEOS	·	1.5 km	MPC · JPL
508821	2001 RF_{10}	—	September 10, 2001	Socorro	LINEAR	H	490 m	MPC · JPL
508822	2001 RQ_{97}	—	September 12, 2001	Kitt Peak	Spacewatch	·	840 m	MPC · JPL
508823	2001 RX_{143}	—	September 12, 2001	Kitt Peak	M. W. Buie	plutino	233 km	MPC · JPL
508824	2001 RW_{155}	—	September 12, 2001	Socorro	LINEAR	·	1.7 km	MPC · JPL
508825	2001 SK_{169}	—	September 20, 2001	Socorro	LINEAR	T_{j} (2.9)	1.2 km	MPC · JPL
508826	2001 SK_{172}	—	September 16, 2001	Socorro	LINEAR	·	960 m	MPC · JPL
508827	2001 ST_{197}	—	September 19, 2001	Socorro	LINEAR	·	1.6 km	MPC · JPL
508828	2001 SH_{212}	—	September 19, 2001	Socorro	LINEAR	·	900 m	MPC · JPL
508829	2001 SZ_{262}	—	August 27, 2001	Anderson Mesa	LONEOS	H	520 m	MPC · JPL
508830	2001 TL_{124}	—	October 12, 2001	Haleakala	NEAT	·	1.8 km	MPC · JPL
508831	2001 UE	—	October 17, 2001	Nashville	Clingan, R.	NYS	1.1 km	MPC · JPL
508832	2001 UO_{90}	—	October 21, 2001	Kitt Peak	Spacewatch	·	1.1 km	MPC · JPL
508833	2001 UM_{141}	—	October 14, 2001	Kitt Peak	Spacewatch	·	1.1 km	MPC · JPL
508834	2001 WX_{4}	—	October 11, 2001	Kitt Peak	Spacewatch	H	570 m	MPC · JPL
508835	2001 XZ_{2}	—	December 9, 2001	Socorro	LINEAR	H	530 m	MPC · JPL
508836	2001 XA_{124}	—	November 16, 2001	Kitt Peak	Spacewatch	·	4.0 km	MPC · JPL
508837	2001 XQ_{161}	—	December 14, 2001	Socorro	LINEAR	·	1.1 km	MPC · JPL
508838	2002 AB_{50}	—	January 9, 2002	Socorro	LINEAR	·	2.8 km	MPC · JPL
508839	2002 AR_{98}	—	December 17, 2001	Socorro	LINEAR	·	2.4 km	MPC · JPL
508840	2002 AN_{113}	—	January 9, 2002	Socorro	LINEAR	·	1.4 km	MPC · JPL
508841	2002 BO_{18}	—	January 21, 2002	Socorro	LINEAR	·	1.4 km	MPC · JPL
508842	2002 BT_{32}	—	July 26, 2014	Haleakala	Pan-STARRS 1	3:2	5.3 km	MPC · JPL
508843	2002 CK_{44}	—	February 10, 2002	Socorro	LINEAR	H	590 m	MPC · JPL
508844	2002 CS_{74}	—	January 19, 2002	Socorro	LINEAR	·	2.7 km	MPC · JPL
508845	2002 CG_{129}	—	February 7, 2002	Socorro	LINEAR	·	2.8 km	MPC · JPL
508846	2002 CG_{150}	—	February 10, 2002	Socorro	LINEAR	·	3.0 km	MPC · JPL
508847	2002 CU_{213}	—	February 10, 2002	Socorro	LINEAR	·	3.0 km	MPC · JPL
508848	2002 CG_{237}	—	February 10, 2002	Socorro	LINEAR	·	2.6 km	MPC · JPL
508849	2002 CY_{264}	—	February 8, 2002	Kitt Peak	M. W. Buie	·	740 m	MPC · JPL
508850	2002 CB_{267}	—	January 14, 2002	Kitt Peak	Spacewatch	·	1.9 km	MPC · JPL
508851	2002 CR_{308}	—	February 10, 2002	Socorro	LINEAR	·	630 m	MPC · JPL
508852	2002 ET_{9}	—	March 13, 2002	Socorro	LINEAR	H	600 m	MPC · JPL
508853	2002 GB_{71}	—	April 9, 2002	Kitt Peak	Spacewatch	·	1.4 km	MPC · JPL
508854	2002 GC_{192}	—	October 9, 2010	Mount Lemmon	Mount Lemmon Survey	L4	7.2 km	MPC · JPL
508855	2002 JS_{125}	—	May 7, 2002	Palomar	NEAT	·	1.3 km	MPC · JPL
508856	2002 LW_{56}	—	June 10, 2002	Palomar	NEAT	PHO	880 m	MPC · JPL
508857	2002 LK_{63}	—	June 11, 2002	Palomar	NEAT	·	2.4 km	MPC · JPL
508858	2002 PQ_{88}	—	August 13, 2002	Kitt Peak	Spacewatch	·	820 m	MPC · JPL
508859	2002 QU	—	August 16, 2002	Kitt Peak	Spacewatch	·	960 m	MPC · JPL
508860	2002 RR_{36}	—	September 5, 2002	Anderson Mesa	LONEOS	T_{j} (2.94)	5.1 km	MPC · JPL
508861	2002 RN_{38}	—	September 5, 2002	Anderson Mesa	LONEOS	T_{j} (2.63) · AMO +1km	1.1 km	MPC · JPL
508862	2002 RY_{75}	—	September 5, 2002	Socorro	LINEAR	·	930 m	MPC · JPL
508863	2002 RZ_{274}	—	September 4, 2002	Palomar	NEAT	·	1.3 km	MPC · JPL
508864	2002 SS_{34}	—	September 5, 2002	Socorro	LINEAR	MAS	770 m	MPC · JPL
508865	2002 TT_{303}	—	October 4, 2002	Apache Point	SDSS	·	1.7 km	MPC · JPL
508866	2002 UZ_{53}	—	October 29, 2002	Apache Point	SDSS	·	830 m	MPC · JPL
508867	2002 VY_{70}	—	November 7, 2002	Socorro	LINEAR	·	1.1 km	MPC · JPL
508868	2002 VV_{87}	—	November 8, 2002	Socorro	LINEAR	·	1.8 km	MPC · JPL
508869	2002 VT_{130}	—	November 7, 2002	Kitt Peak	M. W. Buie	cubewano (cold) · moon	251 km	MPC · JPL
508870	2002 XL_{117}	—	December 10, 2002	Palomar	NEAT	H	400 m	MPC · JPL
508871	2003 CN_{17}	—	February 8, 2003	Haleakala	NEAT	APO	560 m	MPC · JPL
508872	2003 CO_{25}	—	February 4, 2003	Anderson Mesa	LONEOS	·	1.3 km	MPC · JPL
508873	2003 FW_{29}	—	March 25, 2003	Palomar	NEAT	·	1.6 km	MPC · JPL
508874	2003 FO_{79}	—	March 27, 2003	Kitt Peak	Spacewatch	·	1.7 km	MPC · JPL
508875	2003 GA_{2}	—	April 1, 2003	Socorro	LINEAR	·	3.4 km	MPC · JPL
508876	2003 HY_{36}	—	April 29, 2003	Kitt Peak	Spacewatch	·	3.0 km	MPC · JPL
508877	2003 KB_{12}	—	May 27, 2003	Anderson Mesa	LONEOS	·	1.8 km	MPC · JPL
508878	2003 LQ_{1}	—	June 3, 2003	Kitt Peak	Spacewatch	H	470 m	MPC · JPL
508879	2003 SL_{16}	—	September 17, 2003	Socorro	LINEAR	·	1.3 km	MPC · JPL
508880	2003 SL_{70}	—	September 17, 2003	Kitt Peak	Spacewatch	·	1.6 km	MPC · JPL
508881	2003 SZ_{121}	—	September 17, 2003	Campo Imperatore	CINEOS	·	650 m	MPC · JPL
508882	2003 SJ_{209}	—	September 24, 2003	Haleakala	NEAT	·	720 m	MPC · JPL
508883	2003 SA_{245}	—	September 18, 2003	Kitt Peak	Spacewatch	·	570 m	MPC · JPL
508884	2003 SK_{260}	—	September 16, 2003	Kitt Peak	Spacewatch	·	1.6 km	MPC · JPL
508885	2003 SX_{267}	—	September 29, 2003	Kitt Peak	Spacewatch	T_{j} (2.92) · 3:2	4.1 km	MPC · JPL
508886	2003 SS_{279}	—	September 17, 2003	Kitt Peak	Spacewatch	·	600 m	MPC · JPL
508887	2003 SX_{305}	—	September 30, 2003	Socorro	LINEAR	·	1.2 km	MPC · JPL
508888	2003 SR_{324}	—	September 17, 2003	Kitt Peak	Spacewatch	·	1.4 km	MPC · JPL
508889	2003 SZ_{331}	—	September 27, 2003	Kitt Peak	Spacewatch	·	510 m	MPC · JPL
508890	2003 SL_{420}	—	September 18, 2003	Kitt Peak	Spacewatch	·	470 m	MPC · JPL
508891	2003 SR_{428}	—	September 18, 2003	Kitt Peak	Spacewatch	·	1.2 km	MPC · JPL
508892	2003 TY_{35}	—	October 1, 2003	Kitt Peak	Spacewatch	·	550 m	MPC · JPL
508893	2003 UL	—	September 30, 2003	Socorro	LINEAR	·	1.8 km	MPC · JPL
508894	2003 UR_{58}	—	October 16, 2003	Kitt Peak	Spacewatch	·	2.0 km	MPC · JPL
508895	2003 UB_{107}	—	September 21, 2003	Anderson Mesa	LONEOS	ADE	2.0 km	MPC · JPL
508896	2003 UZ_{172}	—	September 28, 2003	Kitt Peak	Spacewatch	ADE	1.9 km	MPC · JPL
508897	2003 UC_{231}	—	October 1, 2003	Kitt Peak	Spacewatch	·	530 m	MPC · JPL
508898	2003 UN_{278}	—	September 22, 2003	Kitt Peak	Spacewatch	·	1.5 km	MPC · JPL
508899	2003 UD_{316}	—	October 22, 2003	Socorro	LINEAR	·	2.2 km	MPC · JPL
508900	2003 UX_{317}	—	September 19, 2003	Kitt Peak	Spacewatch	MRX	870 m	MPC · JPL

== 508901–509000 ==
back to top

Designation			Discovery			Properties		Ref
Permanent	Provisional	Named after	Date	Site	Discoverer(s)	Category	Diam.	Ref
508901	2003 WH_{10}	—	October 18, 2003	Kitt Peak	Spacewatch	·	1.9 km	MPC · JPL
508902	2003 WG_{35}	—	November 19, 2003	Socorro	LINEAR	H	630 m	MPC · JPL
508903	2003 WX_{41}	—	November 20, 2003	Socorro	LINEAR	PHO	1.1 km	MPC · JPL
508904	2003 WR_{58}	—	November 18, 2003	Kitt Peak	Spacewatch	EUN	1.0 km	MPC · JPL
508905	2003 WX_{87}	—	November 21, 2003	Anderson Mesa	LONEOS	AMO +1km	790 m	MPC · JPL
508906	2003 WM_{108}	—	November 20, 2003	Kitt Peak	Spacewatch	·	1.6 km	MPC · JPL
508907	2003 XH_{14}	—	December 5, 2003	Socorro	LINEAR	·	1.2 km	MPC · JPL
508908	2003 YX_{1}	—	December 19, 2003	Catalina	CSS	ATE · PHA	230 m	MPC · JPL
508909	2003 YG_{32}	—	December 18, 2003	Socorro	LINEAR	·	2.0 km	MPC · JPL
508910	2003 YJ_{53}	—	November 21, 2003	Socorro	LINEAR	·	740 m	MPC · JPL
508911	2003 YB_{137}	—	October 29, 2003	Socorro	LINEAR	·	1.5 km	MPC · JPL
508912	2004 BB	—	January 16, 2004	Catalina	CSS	APO	430 m	MPC · JPL
508913	2004 BG_{8}	—	December 18, 2003	Kitt Peak	Spacewatch	·	670 m	MPC · JPL
508914	2004 BT_{16}	—	January 16, 2004	Anderson Mesa	LONEOS	·	1.9 km	MPC · JPL
508915	2004 BL_{39}	—	January 21, 2004	Socorro	LINEAR	PHO	990 m	MPC · JPL
508916	2004 BP_{69}	—	January 28, 2004	Kitt Peak	Spacewatch	H	570 m	MPC · JPL
508917	2004 BS_{71}	—	January 23, 2004	Socorro	LINEAR	PHO	720 m	MPC · JPL
508918	2004 BG_{86}	—	January 28, 2004	Socorro	LINEAR	APO	490 m	MPC · JPL
508919	2004 CM_{17}	—	February 12, 2004	Kitt Peak	Spacewatch	H	710 m	MPC · JPL
508920	2004 CN_{108}	—	February 15, 2004	Palomar	NEAT	·	2.4 km	MPC · JPL
508921	2004 EX_{43}	—	March 12, 2004	Palomar	NEAT	·	910 m	MPC · JPL
508922	2004 EH_{116}	—	January 2, 2011	Mount Lemmon	Mount Lemmon Survey	3:2 · SHU	4.4 km	MPC · JPL
508923	2004 FC_{19}	—	March 16, 2004	Kitt Peak	Spacewatch	H	500 m	MPC · JPL
508924	2004 FV_{23}	—	January 28, 2000	Kitt Peak	Spacewatch	NYS	980 m	MPC · JPL
508925	2004 FY_{43}	—	March 16, 2004	Socorro	LINEAR	PHO	780 m	MPC · JPL
508926	2004 FR_{80}	—	March 22, 2004	Socorro	LINEAR	·	1.8 km	MPC · JPL
508927	2004 FT_{95}	—	February 11, 2004	Socorro	LINEAR	PHO	1.0 km	MPC · JPL
508928	2004 FL_{130}	—	March 23, 2004	Socorro	LINEAR	·	1.2 km	MPC · JPL
508929	2004 GP_{2}	—	March 29, 2004	Catalina	CSS	PHO	840 m	MPC · JPL
508930	2004 GW_{9}	—	April 13, 2004	Socorro	LINEAR	PAL	1.8 km	MPC · JPL
508931	2004 HP_{63}	—	April 25, 2004	Anderson Mesa	LONEOS	·	1.2 km	MPC · JPL
508932	2004 JY_{11}	—	May 13, 2004	Socorro	LINEAR	·	1.0 km	MPC · JPL
508933	2004 OU	—	July 16, 2004	Siding Spring	SSS	H	460 m	MPC · JPL
508934	2004 RN_{35}	—	September 7, 2004	Socorro	LINEAR	(5)	1.1 km	MPC · JPL
508935	2004 RK_{53}	—	September 8, 2004	Socorro	LINEAR	·	1.6 km	MPC · JPL
508936	2004 RH_{63}	—	September 8, 2004	Socorro	LINEAR	(5)	1 km	MPC · JPL
508937	2004 RW_{98}	—	August 25, 2004	Kitt Peak	Spacewatch	(5)	1.2 km	MPC · JPL
508938	2004 RG_{102}	—	August 25, 2004	Kitt Peak	Spacewatch	·	1.2 km	MPC · JPL
508939	2004 RX_{148}	—	September 9, 2004	Socorro	LINEAR	·	1.2 km	MPC · JPL
508940	2004 RQ_{165}	—	September 13, 2004	Socorro	LINEAR	·	950 m	MPC · JPL
508941	2004 RV_{212}	—	September 11, 2004	Socorro	LINEAR	·	1.4 km	MPC · JPL
508942	2004 RU_{324}	—	September 13, 2004	Socorro	LINEAR	·	1.1 km	MPC · JPL
508943	2004 RK_{329}	—	September 15, 2004	Anderson Mesa	LONEOS	EUN	1.1 km	MPC · JPL
508944	2004 RQ_{331}	—	September 15, 2004	Socorro	LINEAR	H	470 m	MPC · JPL
508945	2004 RJ_{345}	—	September 10, 2004	Socorro	LINEAR	·	1.1 km	MPC · JPL
508946	2004 RD_{356}	—	September 10, 2004	Kitt Peak	Spacewatch	·	940 m	MPC · JPL
508947	2004 SF_{9}	—	September 16, 2004	Socorro	LINEAR	EUP	3.7 km	MPC · JPL
508948	2004 SF_{17}	—	September 17, 2004	Anderson Mesa	LONEOS	(5)	1.0 km	MPC · JPL
508949	2004 SU_{34}	—	September 17, 2004	Socorro	LINEAR	·	1.2 km	MPC · JPL
508950	2004 SK_{53}	—	September 13, 2004	Socorro	LINEAR	·	1.1 km	MPC · JPL
508951	2004 TC_{20}	—	October 13, 2004	Siding Spring	SSS	·	1.2 km	MPC · JPL
508952	2004 TU_{38}	—	September 17, 2004	Kitt Peak	Spacewatch	·	1.3 km	MPC · JPL
508953	2004 TD_{44}	—	October 4, 2004	Kitt Peak	Spacewatch	KON	1.8 km	MPC · JPL
508954	2004 TO_{50}	—	October 4, 2004	Kitt Peak	Spacewatch	·	1.5 km	MPC · JPL
508955	2004 TH_{104}	—	October 7, 2004	Anderson Mesa	LONEOS	·	1.0 km	MPC · JPL
508956	2004 TD_{125}	—	October 7, 2004	Socorro	LINEAR	(5)	1.6 km	MPC · JPL
508957	2004 TN_{142}	—	September 15, 2004	Kitt Peak	Spacewatch	MAR	970 m	MPC · JPL
508958	2004 TO_{149}	—	October 6, 2004	Kitt Peak	Spacewatch	·	940 m	MPC · JPL
508959	2004 TF_{187}	—	September 24, 2004	Kitt Peak	Spacewatch	(5)	890 m	MPC · JPL
508960	2004 TZ_{201}	—	October 7, 2004	Kitt Peak	Spacewatch	(5)	950 m	MPC · JPL
508961	2004 TV_{220}	—	September 11, 2004	Socorro	LINEAR	·	1.3 km	MPC · JPL
508962	2004 TW_{274}	—	October 9, 2004	Kitt Peak	Spacewatch	·	470 m	MPC · JPL
508963	2004 TD_{315}	—	October 11, 2004	Kitt Peak	Spacewatch	(5)	1.2 km	MPC · JPL
508964	2004 TW_{317}	—	October 11, 2004	Kitt Peak	Spacewatch	·	1.2 km	MPC · JPL
508965	2004 TJ_{333}	—	October 9, 2004	Kitt Peak	Spacewatch	·	910 m	MPC · JPL
508966	2004 UZ_{1}	—	October 16, 2004	Socorro	LINEAR	·	1.4 km	MPC · JPL
508967	2004 VC_{17}	—	November 7, 2004	Socorro	LINEAR	APO · PHA	710 m	MPC · JPL
508968	2004 VR_{54}	—	November 9, 2004	Catalina	CSS	H	540 m	MPC · JPL
508969	2004 VH_{69}	—	November 10, 2004	Kitt Peak	Spacewatch	·	1.2 km	MPC · JPL
508970	2004 VX_{87}	—	November 11, 2004	Kitt Peak	Spacewatch	·	830 m	MPC · JPL
508971	2004 VH_{105}	—	November 9, 2004	Mauna Kea	Veillet, C.	·	480 m	MPC · JPL
508972	2004 WA_{7}	—	November 9, 2004	Catalina	CSS	·	1.5 km	MPC · JPL
508973	2004 XD_{10}	—	December 2, 2004	Kitt Peak	Spacewatch	·	1.4 km	MPC · JPL
508974	2004 XC_{61}	—	December 10, 2004	Socorro	LINEAR	·	2.4 km	MPC · JPL
508975	2004 XQ_{111}	—	December 14, 2004	Kitt Peak	Spacewatch	·	1.3 km	MPC · JPL
508976	2004 XS_{157}	—	December 14, 2004	Kitt Peak	Spacewatch	L5	10 km	MPC · JPL
508977	2004 XR_{170}	—	December 9, 2004	Catalina	CSS	H	710 m	MPC · JPL
508978	2004 XX_{171}	—	December 10, 2004	Kitt Peak	Spacewatch	H	410 m	MPC · JPL
508979	2004 XV_{182}	—	December 2, 2004	Kitt Peak	Spacewatch	H	510 m	MPC · JPL
508980	2005 AH_{27}	—	January 11, 2005	Socorro	LINEAR	H	460 m	MPC · JPL
508981	2005 AV_{58}	—	January 15, 2005	Socorro	LINEAR	·	2.1 km	MPC · JPL
508982	2005 CB	—	January 13, 2005	Catalina	CSS	H	510 m	MPC · JPL
508983	2005 CU_{15}	—	February 2, 2005	Socorro	LINEAR	JUN	1.0 km	MPC · JPL
508984	2005 EF_{69}	—	March 7, 2005	Socorro	LINEAR	·	2.0 km	MPC · JPL
508985	2005 EH_{70}	—	December 15, 2004	Catalina	CSS	·	1.4 km	MPC · JPL
508986	2005 EP_{97}	—	February 1, 2005	Kitt Peak	Spacewatch	·	1.9 km	MPC · JPL
508987	2005 ER_{133}	—	March 9, 2005	Catalina	CSS	·	780 m	MPC · JPL
508988	2005 ET_{135}	—	November 18, 2003	Kitt Peak	Spacewatch	·	1.9 km	MPC · JPL
508989	2005 EQ_{201}	—	February 28, 2005	Catalina	CSS	·	1.4 km	MPC · JPL
508990	2005 EY_{225}	—	March 9, 2005	Catalina	CSS	H	520 m	MPC · JPL
508991	2005 EZ_{237}	—	March 11, 2005	Kitt Peak	Spacewatch	·	1.6 km	MPC · JPL
508992	2005 EU_{245}	—	March 9, 2005	Mount Lemmon	Mount Lemmon Survey	·	1.7 km	MPC · JPL
508993	2005 EA_{250}	—	March 14, 2005	Socorro	LINEAR	H	460 m	MPC · JPL
508994	2005 ER_{250}	—	March 10, 2005	Anderson Mesa	LONEOS	H	500 m	MPC · JPL
508995	2005 EP_{271}	—	March 13, 2005	Catalina	CSS	·	2.4 km	MPC · JPL
508996	2005 EP_{284}	—	March 11, 2005	Mount Lemmon	Mount Lemmon Survey	·	480 m	MPC · JPL
508997	2005 FL_{4}	—	March 30, 2005	Socorro	LINEAR	T_{j} (2.83) · APO +1km	1.3 km	MPC · JPL
508998	2005 GO_{7}	—	April 1, 2005	Anderson Mesa	LONEOS	·	1.8 km	MPC · JPL
508999	2005 GW_{19}	—	April 2, 2005	Mount Lemmon	Mount Lemmon Survey	·	1.5 km	MPC · JPL
509000	2005 GZ_{40}	—	April 4, 2005	Mount Lemmon	Mount Lemmon Survey	·	850 m	MPC · JPL

back to top

== Meaning of names ==
As minor planet discoveries are confirmed, they are given a permanent number by the IAU's Minor Planet Center (MPC), and the discoverers can then submit names for them, following the IAU's naming conventions. The list below concerns those minor planets in the specified number-range that have received names, and explains the meanings of those names.

Official naming citations of newly named small Solar System bodies are approved and published in a bulletin by IAU's Working Group for Small Bodies Nomenclature (WGSBN). Before May 2021, citations were published in MPC's Minor Planet Circulars for many decades. Recent citations can also be found on the JPL Small-Body Database (SBDB). Until his death in 2016, German astronomer Lutz D. Schmadel compiled these citations into the Dictionary of Minor Planet Names (DMP) and regularly updated the collection.

Based on Paul Herget's The Names of the Minor Planets, Schmadel also researched the unclear origin of numerous asteroids, most of which had been named prior to World War II. This article incorporates text from this source, which is in the public domain: SBDB New namings may only be added to this list below after official publication as the preannouncement of names is condemned. The WGSBN publishes a comprehensive guideline for the naming rules of non-cometary small Solar System bodies.

Named minor planet	Provisional	This minor planet was named for...	Ref · Catalog
508440 Lewishamilton	2016 LH_{7}	Lewis Carl Davidson Hamilton, British-Grenadian Formula One driver and seven-time world champion.	IAU · 508440
